= 2025 Michigan Panthers season =

American professional football season

- General manager: Steve Kazor
- Head coach: Mike Nolan
- Home stadium: Ford Field

Results
- Record: 6–4
- Conference place: 2nd in USFL Conference
- Playoffs: Won Conference Finals (at Stallions) 44–29; Lost UFL Championship (at Defenders) 34–58

Uniform

The 2025 Michigan Panthers season was the fourth season for the Michigan Panthers as a professional American football franchise and the second season in the United Football League (UFL). The Panthers played their home games at Ford Field and were led by third year head coach Mike Nolan. On October 3, 2025, it was announced that this season was the final year the team would play in the state of Michigan, and announced a relocation to a site named later.

The Panthers began the season 6–2 with quarterback Bryce Perkins winning UFL Offensive Player of the Week three times from weeks three through six. Perkins had an ankle injury that kept him out the final three weeks of the season. In week eight, quarterback Danny Etling had a three touchdown performance in a 30–18 playoff clinching victory over Houston. Michigan dropped its final two games to finish 6–4. However, even if they won those games, they would not host the USFL Conference Championship Game due to a scheduling conflict.

Michigan then went to Birmingham to play the Stallions in the USFL Conference Championship Game for the second consecutive year. Despite being 0–7 against the Stallions since 2022, the Panthers won 44–29, and clinched their first championship berth in team history. In the UFL Championship Game the Panthers played the DC Defenders and lost, 34–58. Wide receiver Malik Turner, who led the Panthers with four touchdown receptions in the regular season was dominant in the postseason. Against Birmingham, Turner had six receptions for 99 yards including a 76-yard touchdown. In the championship, Turner had a game high ten receptions for 168 yards and three touchdowns.

On the season, quarterback Bryce Perkins won UFL Most Valuable Player, Offensive Player of the Year and was named All-UFL Team. Running back Toa Taua led the league with six rushing touchdowns despite playing in just seven games. Wide receiver Siaosi Mariner led the league with 528 receiving yards. Offensively, the Panthers also had tight end Gunnar Oakes and lineman Ryan Nelson and Cohl Cabral named All-UFL.

Return specialist Xavier Malone led the league with 516 kick return yards while safety Kedrick Whitehead Jr. was named Special Teams Player of the Year and All-UFL. The Panthers won Special Teams Player of the Week three times, which led the league. Devin Ross, Samson Nacua and Xavier Malone were all recipients. Defensively, cornerback Arnold Tarpley III was named All-UFL while cornerback DJ Miller earned Defensive Player of the Week.

Through the 2025 season, the Panthers are 13–7 in two seasons of UFL play. Overall, the Panthers are 19–21 in their four-year history. Head coach Mike Nolan has a 17–13 record over his three-year stint since taking over a 2–8 Panthers in 2022.

== Final roster ==
2025 Michigan Panthers final roster
Quarterbacks: 8 Danny Etling; 12 Rocky Lombardi; 3 Bryce Perkins; Running backs: 26 Matt Colburn; 28 Nate McCrary; 35 Toa Taua; Wide receivers: 13 Xavier Malone; 4 Siaosi Mariner; 7 Jaylon Moore; 86 Samson Nacua; 6 Devin Ross; 17 Malik Turner; Tight ends: 80 Cole Hikutini; 84 Gunnar Oakes; 85 Jalen Wydermyer	Offensive linemen: 73 Jake Burton G; 69 Cohl Cabral G; 78 Cam Carter T/G; 60 Victor Curne G; 77 Brian Dooley T; 61 Noah Johnson C; 75 Ryan Nelson T; 72 Chim Okorafor T; 76 Keith Russell G; Defensive linemen: 97 Ron'Dell Carter DE; 96 T. J. Carter DT; 44 Garrett Marino DT; 90 Benning Potoa'e DT; 57 Breeland Speaks DE; 94 Taylor Stallworth DT; 91 Ron Stone Jr. DE; 42 Mika Tafua DE; 48 Kenny Willekes DE	Linebackers: 10 Noah Dawkins; 45 Donavan Mutin; 40 Andrew Parker Jr.; 11 Javin White; Defensive backs: 19 Adonis Alexander CB; 30 Dee Delaney FS; 15 Akeem Dent SS; 16 Kiante Hardin CB; 18 Keni-H Lovely CB; 11 D.J. Miller CB; 21 Kai Nacua SS; 2 Arnold Tarpley III FS; 20 Michael Tutsie SS; 32 Kedrick Whitehead Jr. CB; Special teams: 46 Peter Bowden LS; 33 B. T. Potter K; 36 Seth Vernon P	Reserve lists: 23 De'Gabriel Floyd LB (IR); 25 Tyree Gillespie SS (IR); 5 Frank Ginda LB (IR); -- Devin Gray WR Retired; 29 Sean Mahone SS Retired; 54 Jordan Ober LS (IR); 99 Walter Palmore DT (IR); -- Trey Quinn WR Retired; 1 Levonta Taylor CB (IR); 22 Bryce Torneden CB (IR); 50 active, 10 inactive

== Staff ==
Michigan Panthers staff
Front office: General manager – Steve Kazor; Head coaches: Head coach – Mike Nolan; Offensive coaches: Offensive coordinator – Marcel Bellefeuille; Offensive line – Tim Holt; Running backs – Jordan Pavlisin; Special teams coordinator/Wide receivers – Jaron Fairman; Tight ends – Gary Watkins	Defensive coaches: Defensive coordinator/Defensive line – Collin Bauer; Linebackers – Christian Runza; Defensive backs – Brock Marion

== Schedule ==
All times Eastern

Week	Day	Date	Kickoff	TV	Opponent	Results		Location	Attendance
Week	Day	Date	Kickoff	TV	Opponent	Score	Record	Location	Attendance
1	Sunday	March 30	12:00 p.m.	ESPN	at Memphis Showboats	W 26–12	1–0	Simmons Bank Liberty Stadium	4,373
2	Friday	April 4	8:00 p.m.	Fox	Birmingham Stallions	L 12–21	1–1	Ford Field	10,049
3	Sunday	April 13	12:00 p.m.	ABC	San Antonio Brahmas	W 26–23	2–1	Ford Field	11,013
4	Friday	April 18	8:00 p.m.	Fox	Memphis Showboats	W 27–9	3–1	Ford Field	9,674
5	Saturday	April 26	7:00 p.m.	ESPN	at St. Louis Battlehawks	L 27–32	3–2	The Dome at America's Center	30,406
6	Sunday	May 4	12:00 p.m.	ESPN	DC Defenders	W 38–14	4–2	Ford Field	11,653
7	Saturday	May 10	1:00 p.m.	Fox	at Arlington Renegades	W 25–24	5–2	Choctaw Stadium	9,963
8	Saturday	May 17	1:00 p.m.	Fox	at Houston Roughnecks	W 30–18	6–2	Space City Financial Stadium	4,007
9	Saturday	May 24	3:00 p.m.	ABC	at Birmingham Stallions	L 22–26	6–3	Protective Stadium	10,344
10	Saturday	May 31	3:00 p.m.	ESPN	Houston Roughnecks	L 12–19	6–4	Ford Field	16,014

== Standings ==
2025 UFL standings
USFL Conference
Team	W	L	PCT	GB	TD+/-	TD+	TD-	DIV	PF	PA	DIFF	STK
(y) Birmingham Stallions	7	3	.700	–	8	28	20	5–1	244	167	77	W2
(x) Michigan Panthers	6	4	.600	1	8	30	22	3–3	245	198	47	L2
(e) Houston Roughnecks	5	5	.500	2	0	22	22	3–3	183	201	-18	W2
(e) Memphis Showboats	2	8	.200	5	-13	15	28	1–5	148	246	-98	L2
XFL Conference
Team	W	L	PCT	GB	TD+/-	TD+	TD-	DIV	PF	PA	DIFF	STK
(y) St. Louis Battlehawks	8	2	.800	–	7	26	19	4–2	231	163	68	W6
(x) DC Defenders	6	4	.600	2	3	28	25	4–2	225	224	1	L2
(e) Arlington Renegades	5	5	.500	3	4	23	19	3–3	229	168	61	W2
(e) San Antonio Brahmas	1	9	.100	7	-17	14	31	1–5	136	274	-138	L6
(x)–clinched playoff berth; (y)–clinched conference; (e)–eliminated from playoff contention

== Postseason ==
=== Schedule ===
Week	Day	Date	Kickoff	TV	Opponent	Results		Location	Attendance
Week	Day	Date	Kickoff	TV	Opponent	Score	Record	Location	Attendance
USFL Conference Championship	Sunday	June 8	3:00 p.m.	ABC	at Birmingham Stallions	W 44–29	1–0	Protective Stadium	10,928
UFL Championship	Saturday	June 14	8:00 p.m.	ABC	vs. DC Defenders	L 34–58	1–1	The Dome at America's Center	14,558
