= Sports in Oklahoma City =

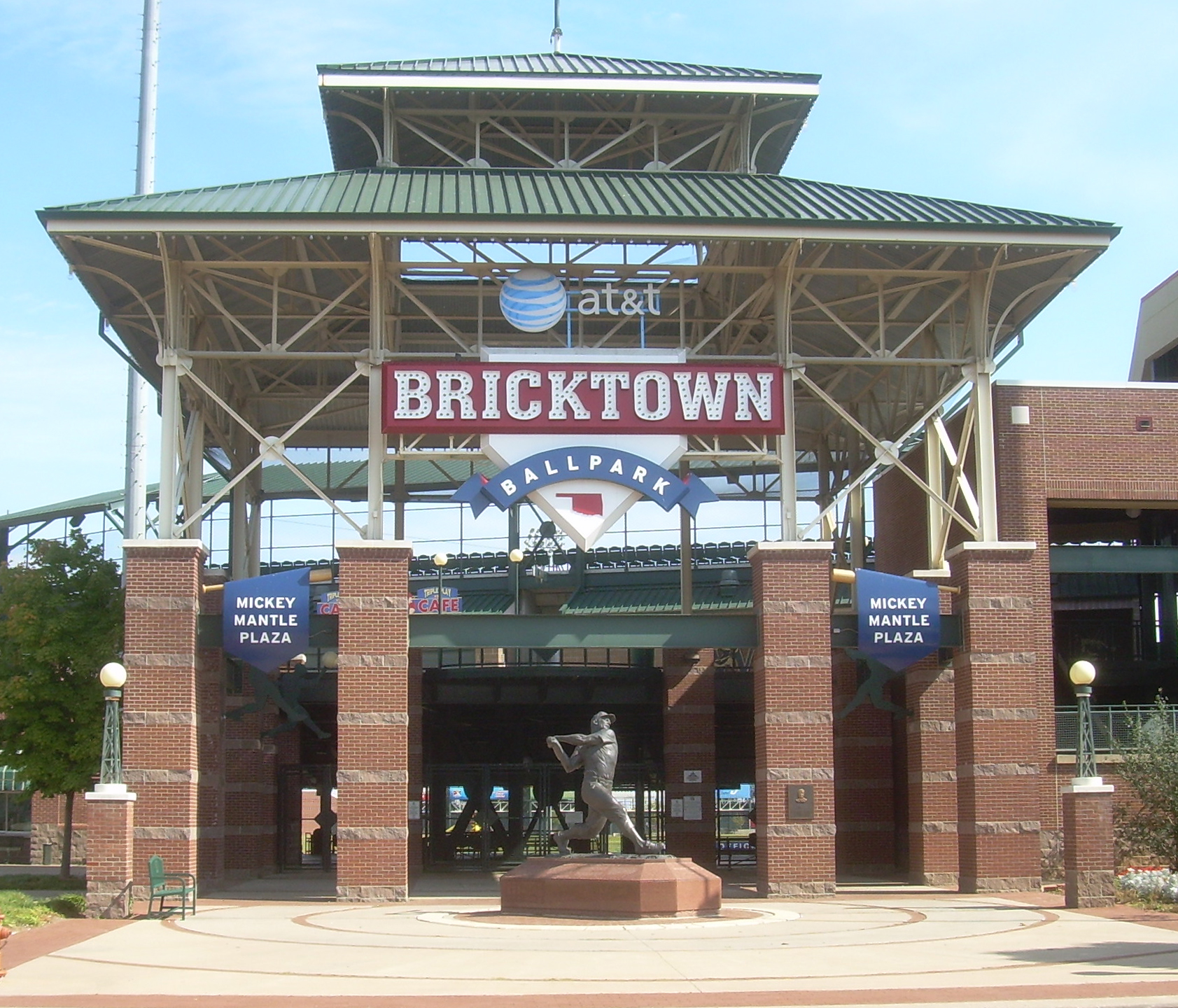
Chickasaw Bricktown Ballpark, home of the Oklahoma City Comets and the Big 12 Conference baseball tournament.

Oklahoma City is home to several professional sports teams, including the Oklahoma City Thunder of the National Basketball Association (NBA). The Thunder is the city's second "permanent" major professional sports franchise after the now-defunct AFL Oklahoma Wranglers and is the third major-league team to call the city home when considering the temporary hosting of the New Orleans/Oklahoma City Hornets for the 2005–06 and 2006–07 NBA seasons.

Other notable professional sports clubs in Oklahoma City include the Oklahoma City Comets, which is the Triple-A affiliate of the Los Angeles Dodgers, and the Crusaders of Oklahoma Rugby Football Club USA Rugby.

== Venues ==
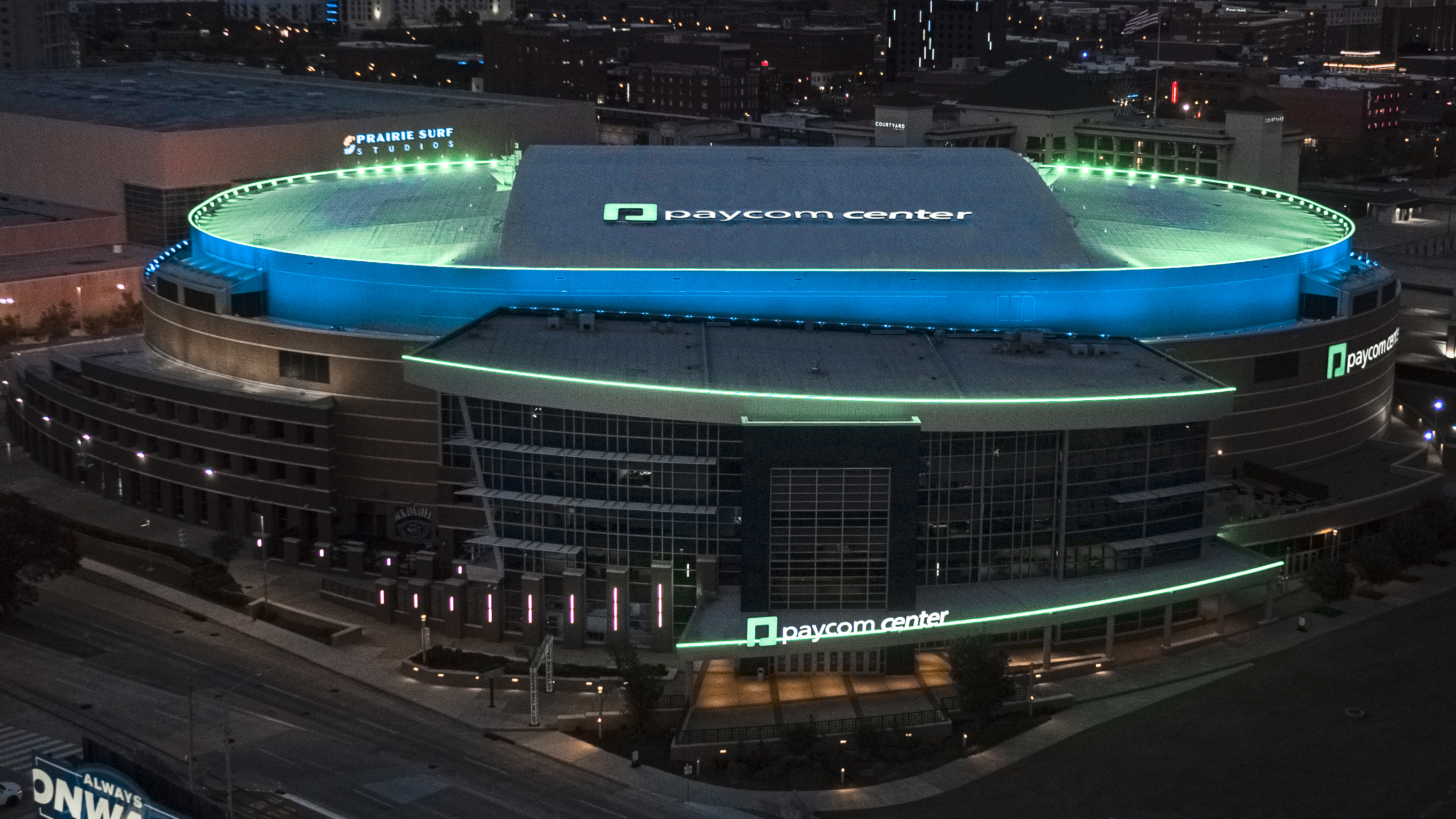
Paycom Center, home of the Oklahoma City Thunder.

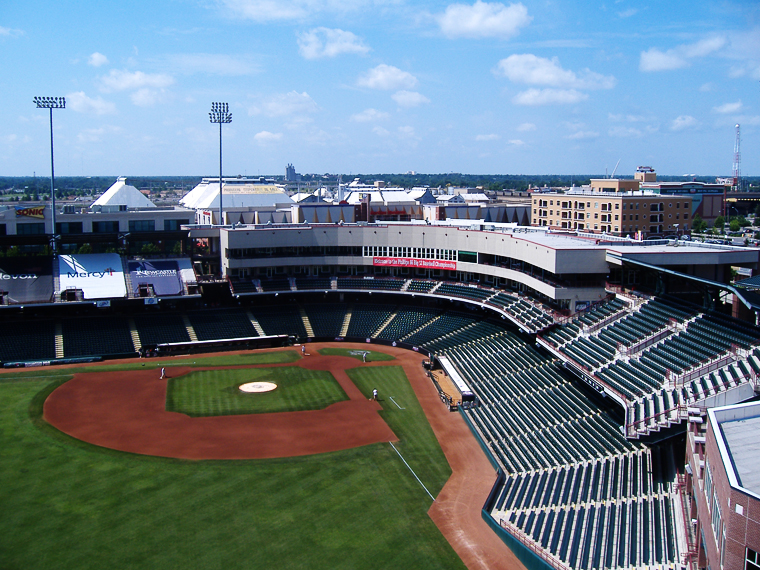
Chickasaw Bricktown Ballpark.

Paycom Center in downtown Oklahoma City is the large multipurpose arena which hosts concerts, NHL exhibition games, and many of the city's pro sports teams. In 2008, the Oklahoma City Thunder became the major tenant.

Located nearby in Bricktown, the Chickasaw Bricktown Ballpark is the home to the city's baseball team, the Comets. "The Brick", as it is locally known, is considered one of the finest minor league parks in the nation.

There are several other stadiums and arenas in the city, including the OG&E Colosseum, Taft Stadium, USA Softball Hall of Fame Stadium, and Abe Lemons Arena which is located at Oklahoma City University. Several other venues were previously used, but now have been demolished, including the arena inside the Cox Convention Center, which was demolished to make room for the construction of the Continental Coliseum for the OKC Thunder, and the Jim Norick Arena in the Oklahoma State Fairground, which was demolished to be replaced by the OG&E Coliseum.

The Oklahoma City Stadium is a multipurpose venue currently under construction near downtown Oklahoma City, scheduled to open in early 2028. Designed by Populous and funded through the city's MAPS 4 initiative, the stadium will have an initial capacity of just over 10,000 and will serve as the home of OKC Energy FC upon the club's return to the USL Championship. The venue is intended to host soccer, football, concerts, and other events, and will anchor a new multi-use entertainment district connecting downtown OKC to the Oklahoma River.

MacArthur Park Raceway is an internationally recognized raceway in Oklahoma City.

== Basketball ==
=== Hornets ===
In the aftermath of Hurricane Katrina in New Orleans, Louisiana, and surrounding areas, the NBA's New Orleans Hornets (now the New Orleans Pelicans) temporarily relocated to the venue then known as Ford Center, playing the majority of its home games there during the 2005–06 and 2006–07 seasons. The team became the first NBA franchise to play regular-season games in the state of Oklahoma.

The team was known as the New Orleans/Oklahoma City Hornets while playing in Oklahoma City and had adopted a split personality of sorts, wearing 'KC neutral' home jerseys (with an KC patch of sorts over an H-alternate jersey) and 'New Orleans' jerseys during away games.

Although some city officials wanted the Hornets to stay in Oklahoma City permanently, the team ultimately returned to New Orleans full-time for the 2007–08 season. The Hornets played their final home game in Oklahoma City during the exhibition season on October 9, 2007, against the Houston Rockets, as a way to say thanks for the temporary hosting. The 'hometown Hornets' won the game 94–92.

=== Thunder ===
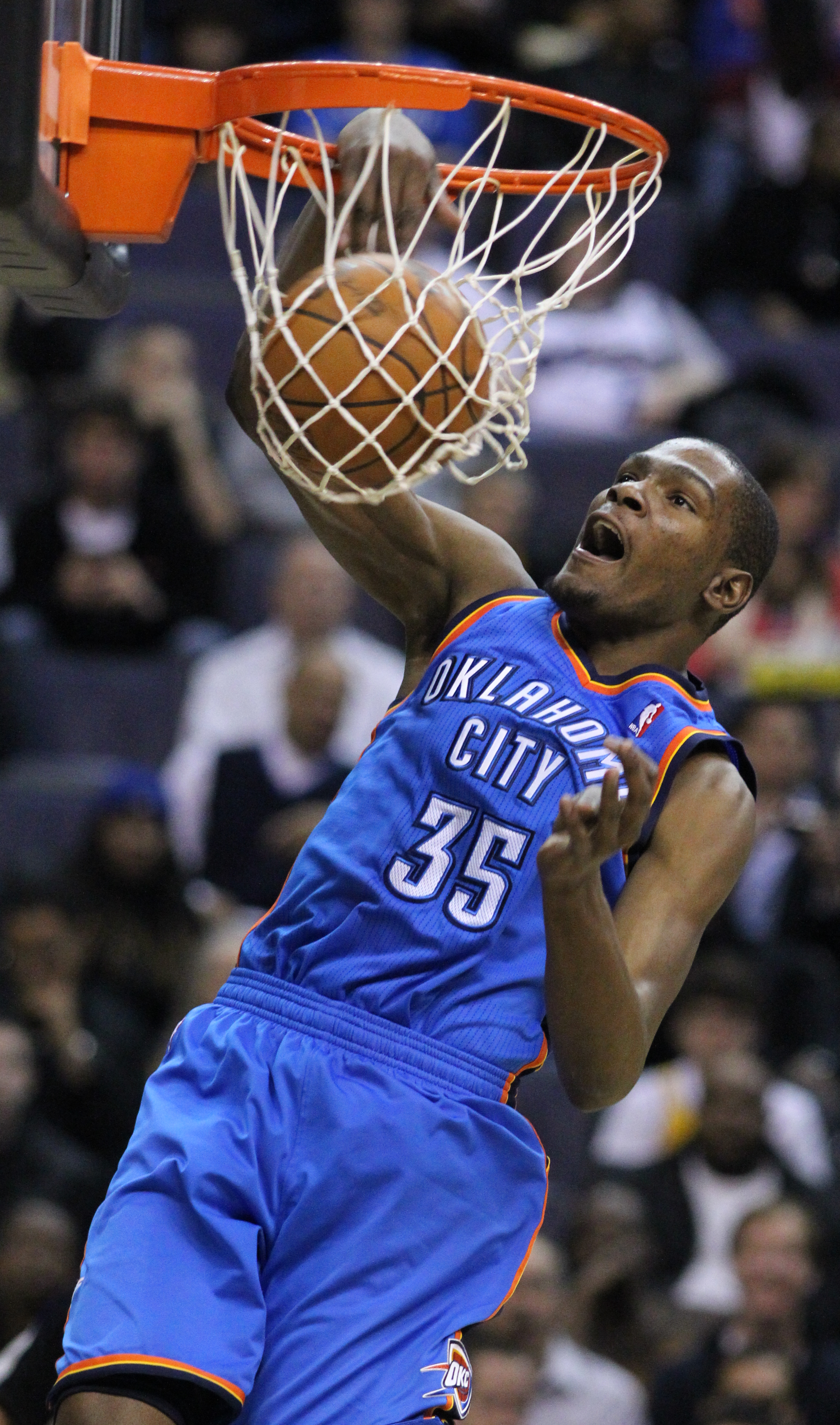
Kevin Durant dunking against the Wizards on March 11, 2011.

On July 2, 2008, the National Basketball Association (NBA)'s Seattle SuperSonics franchise announced the team would relocate to Oklahoma City, and begin play at the city's sports arena (then known as the Ford Center) starting with the 2008–09 NBA season. On July 2, the city of Seattle settled with the ownership group of the SuperSonics franchise, allowing them to move the team immediately. As part of the settlement, the SuperSonics name, logos, and colors were left in Seattle for any use by a future expansion or relocated team in Seattle. The franchise history would be shared between the hypothetical team and the Thunder. The relocated team was named the Oklahoma City Thunder and color scheme for the Oklahoma City Thunder was announced on September 3. Other name finalists for the relocated team included "Energy", "Wind", "Marshalls", "Barons", and "Bison".

With a 28–2 vote by its Board of Governors, on April 18, 2008, the NBA had provided conditional approval for the franchise to move to Oklahoma City for the 2008–09 season provided the ownership could free themselves from the legal challenges that existed with the city of Seattle. On July 2, 2008, the city of Seattle reached an agreement to terminate the Sonics' lease and allow the team to relocate to Oklahoma City. Clay Bennett determined that as of July 3, 2008 the relocation of the now-defunct Seattle SuperSonics would commence. The team was the fourth NBA franchise to relocate since 1985; the Kansas City Kings moved to Sacramento, the Vancouver Grizzlies to Memphis and the Charlotte Hornets to New Orleans.

In April 2010, the Thunder secured a position in the NBA's Western Conference Playoffs, having its best season since the mid-1990s and winning two games in a series against the defending champion Los Angeles Lakers. In 2012, the team made it to the playoff finals, but lost their championship opportunity to the Miami Heat. According to Forbes, the first year the team was in Oklahoma City, the Thunder earned $111,000,000 in revenue. This is considered to be an overwhelming success and ranks them in the 20th position in the NBA. The team's operating income of $12.7 million was on par with such veteran NBA franchises as the Boston Celtics, who earned $12.9 million and far exceeding the net operating losses of the Dallas Mavericks and the Portland Trail Blazers of -$17.4 and -$20.3 respectively. Meanwhile, they returned to the NBA Finals in 2025 and defeated the Indiana Pacers in seven games to win their first NBA championship since moving to Oklahoma City.

== Football ==
Beginning in 2028, Oklahoma City will be the home of the Oklahoma UFL team.

== Soccer ==
Two sides have emerged in the race for an Oklahoma City professional soccer team. On July 2, 2013, 3rd division USL Pro awarded a franchise to Prodigal LLC, an OKC-based event management company. Prodigal has partnered with ADG in building a 7,000 seat soccer-specific stadium, with the ability to expand to 20,000 to meet MLS standards. Prodigal CEO Bob Funk Jr stated, "We look forward to working with ADG to design a stadium that can serve the needs of our USL PRO team, and also expand based on our long-term goal of bringing an MLS team to Oklahoma City."

On July 25, 2013, 2nd division NASL awarded a franchise to Sold Out Strategies, led by Brad Lund. As a result, USL sent a cease-and-desist letter to Sold Out Strategies who, in turn, countered with a lawsuit. OKC Pro soccer LLC businessman Tim McLaughlin now manages the NASL franchise. Both the NASL and USL Pro teams battled for Taft Stadium access to begin their first season. The Oklahoma City School Board awarded the Taft Stadium lease agreement to the NASL franchise.

Since USL Pro holds a player development agreement with MLS, Prodigal Director of Entertainment Darren Ransely noted, "For Oklahoma City, bringing USL Pro is a conjugate path for the future to bring in a MLS team." As the battle between the 2 sides continue, NASL team leader McLaughlin added, "It will be up to the community to decide." The Oklahoma City Energy FC began play in USL Pro, since rebranded as the United Soccer League, in Spring 2014. Rayo OKC began play in the NASL Spring 2016 season, but folded after the NASL's 2016 fall season.

== Other sporting events ==
Oklahoma City is the annual host of the NCAA Women's College World Series. The city has held the 2005 NCAA Men's Basketball First and Second round and hosted the Big 12 Men's and Women's Basketball Tournaments in 2007 and 2009. Since 2006, Oklahoma City has been home to the annual Bricktown Showdown Triple-A Baseball Championship game.

Other major sporting events include Thoroughbred and Quarter horse racing circuits at Remington Park and numerous horse shows and equine events that take place at the state fairgrounds each year. There are numerous golf courses and country clubs spread around the city in addition to tennis clubs and high school level sporting activities including the well known "Polo Bowl" between Casady School (Cyclones) and Heritage Hall School (Chargers).

On June 21, 2024, the LAOCOG announced that Oklahoma City, Oklahoma would host the canoe slalom and softball events for the 2028 Summer Olympics.

== Metropolitan area collegiate sports ==
Oklahoma City is host to numerous major college and amateur sporting events. The major universities in the area – the University of Oklahoma (located within the metropolitan area in Norman), Oklahoma City University (located in the city proper), and Oklahoma State University – often schedule major basketball games and other sporting events at Chesapeake Energy Arena, although most games are played in their campus arenas.

The Oklahoma City University Stars has a slate of sporting clubs which play on campus including a top-rated rowing program which has events on the Oklahoma River. Of special note, the university had announced its desire to possibly enter the NCAA during the 2007 athletic season.

=== Collegiate teams ===
School	Nickname	Colors	Association	Conference	Secondary Association(s)
University of Oklahoma	Sooners	Crimson and Cream	NCAA Division I	SEC	ACHA, MCLA
Oklahoma State University	Cowboys and Cowgirls	Orange and Black	NCAA Division I	SEC	
University of Central Oklahoma	Bronchos	Bronze and Blue	NCAA Division II	MIAA	ACHA
Oklahoma Baptist University	Bison	Green and Gold	NCAA Division II	GAC	
Southern Nazarene University	Crimson Storm	Crimson and White	NCAA Division II	GAC	NCCAA Division I
Oklahoma Christian University	Eagles and Lady Eagles	Maroon and Grey	NCAA Division II	Heartland	NCCAA Division I
Langston University	Lions	Navy Blue and Orange	NAIA	SAC	
Mid-America Christian University	Evangels	Red and White	NAIA	SAC	NCCAA Division I
Oklahoma City University	Stars	White and Blue	NAIA	SAC	
University of Science and Arts	Drovers	Green and Gold	NAIA	SAC	
Southwestern Christian University	Eagles	White and Blue	NAIA	SAC	NCCAA Division I
Redlands Community College	Cougars	Red, Yellow, Black and White	NJCAA	BSC	
Rose State College	Raiders	Blue and Gold	NJCAA	BSC	
Randall University	Saints	Blue and Gold	NCCAA	Southwest Region	ACCA

== Current metropolitan area teams ==
League	Team	Venue	Location	Founded	Titles
National Basketball Association	Oklahoma City Thunder	Paycom Center	Oklahoma City, Oklahoma	2008	1
NBA G League	Oklahoma City Blue	Paycom Center	Oklahoma City, Oklahoma	2009	1
Professional Bull Riders	Oklahoma Wildcatters	Paycom Center	Oklahoma City, Oklahoma	2024	0
United Soccer League Championship	OKC United FC	Oklahoma City Stadium (under construction; returning 2028)	Oklahoma City, Oklahoma	2014	0
Pacific Coast League	Oklahoma City Comets	Chickasaw Bricktown Ballpark	Oklahoma City, Oklahoma	1998	6
AUSL	Oklahoma City Spark	Devon Park	Oklahoma City, Oklahoma	2023	1
National Premier Soccer League	Oklahoma City 1889 FC	University of Central Oklahoma	Edmond, Oklahoma	2014	0
Women's Premier Soccer League	Oklahoma City FC	Casady School	Oklahoma City, Oklahoma		0
United Football League	Oklahoma UFL team	TBD	Oklahoma City, Oklahoma	2028	0
The League for Clubs	Oklahoma United FC	Chad Richison Stadium	Oklahoma City, Oklahoma	2025	0

== Former teams ==
Oklahoma City was home to the following defunct sports teams:

- Bricktown Brawlers: Indoor Football League (2010–11)
- New Orleans/Oklahoma City Hornets: National Basketball Association (2005–07)
- Oklahoma City Alliance: Southwest Indoor Soccer League/United States Interregional Soccer League (1996–98)
- Oklahoma City Barons: American Hockey League (2010–15)
- Oklahoma City Blazers (original franchise): Central Hockey League (1965–77)
- Oklahoma City Blazers (second franchise): Central Hockey League (1992–2009)
- Oklahoma City Cavalry: Continental Basketball Association (1990–97 and 2007–09)
- Oklahoma City Coyotes: Roller Hockey International (1995–97)
- Oklahoma City Dolls: All-woman American Football League (1976–82)
- Oklahoma City FC: Premier Development League (2013) and National Premier Soccer League (2014); attempted to join the Division II North American Soccer League for 2015 but never fielded a team
- Oklahoma City Indians: Texas League Minor League Baseball (1909–57)
- Oklahoma City Lightning: Women's Football Alliance (2002–08 and 2010–11)
- Oklahoma City Roller Derby: Women's Flat Track Derby Association (2006–16; merged with the Oklahoma Victory Dolls in 2017)
- Oklahoma City Slickers: American Soccer League (1982–83) / United Soccer League (1984–85, as the Oklahoma City Stampede)
- Oklahoma City Spirit: Lone Star Soccer Alliance (1989–93)
- Oklahoma City Stars: Central Hockey League (1978–82)
- Oklahoma City Warriors (ice hockey): American Hockey Association (1933–36)
- Oklahoma City Warriors (soccer): Southwest Indoor Soccer League/United States Interregional Soccer League (1986–96)
- Oklahoma City Yard Dawgz: Arena Football League (2004–09)
- Oklahoma Wranglers: Arena Football League (2000–2001)
- Rayo OKC: North American Soccer League (2015–16)

== 2028 Olympics ==
Oklahoma City will host two events during the 2028 Summer Olympics which will be held in Los Angeles. The LA Olympic Organizing Committee opted to have canoe slalom and softball in Oklahoma City given the lack of acceptable venues for those sports in the Los Angeles area. Riversport OKC will host the canoe slalom competition while Devon Park will host the softball competition.

== See also ==
- Sports in Oklahoma
