= Toa Taua =

American football player (born 2000)

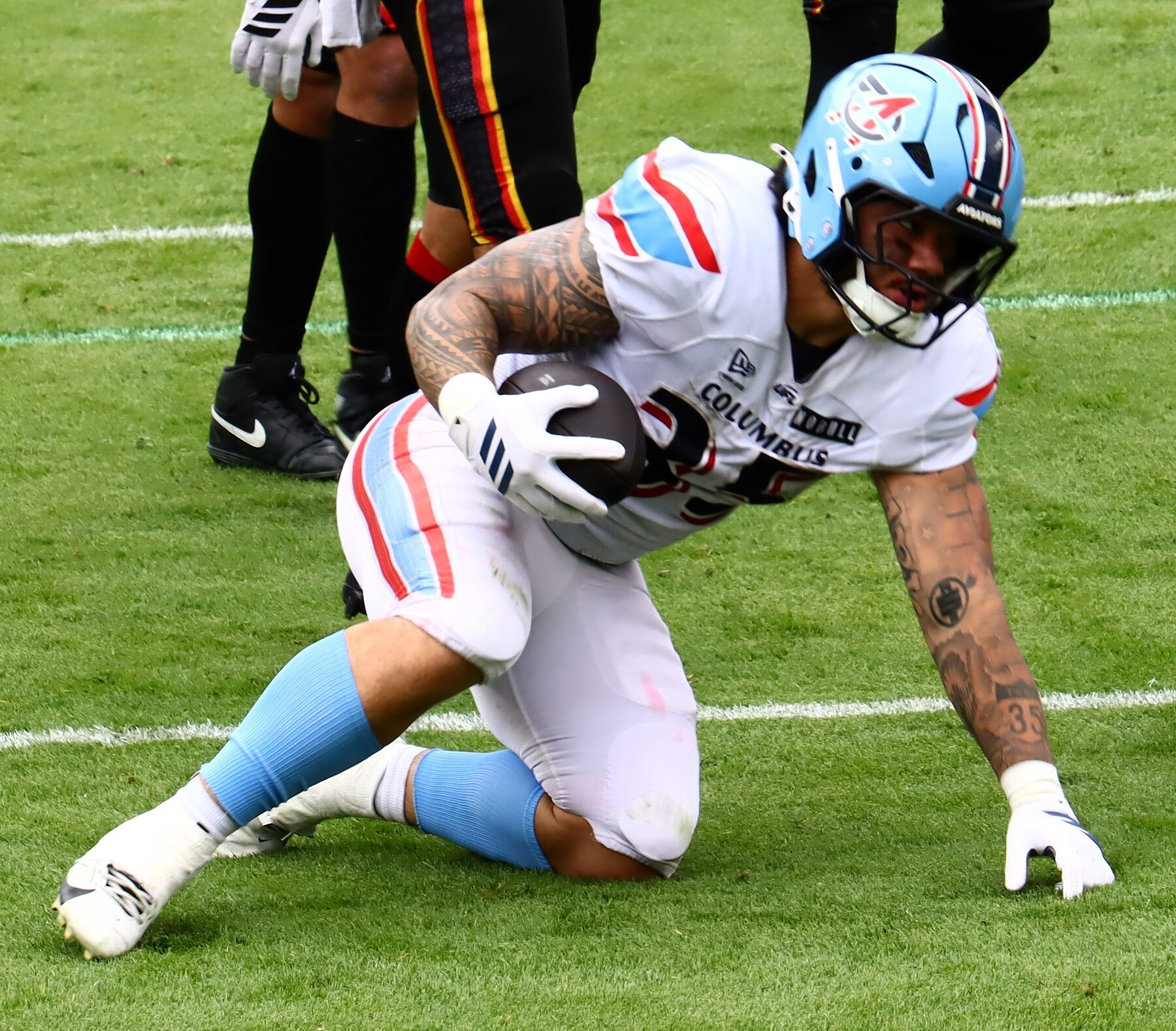
- Taua with the Columbus Aviators in 2026

No. 35 – Columbus Aviators
- Position: Running back
- Roster status: Active

Personal information
- Born: February 15, 2000 (age 26); Lompoc, California, U.S.
- Listed height: 5 ft 8 in (1.73 m)
- Listed weight: 225 lb (102 kg)

Career information
- High school: Lompoc (CA)
- College: Nevada (2018–2022)
- NFL draft: 2023: undrafted

Career history
- Michigan Panthers (2023–2025); Cleveland Browns (2025)*; Columbus Aviators (2026–present)
- * Offseason or practice squad member only

Awards and highlights
- UFL rushing touchdowns leader (2025); MW Freshman of the Year (2018); Second-team All-MW (2020)

Career USFL / UFL statistics as of 2025
- GP / GS: 10 / 4
- Rushing yards: 383
- Rush avg.: 4.3
- Touchdowns: 6
- Receiving yards: 76
- Rec. avg.: 8.4

Toa Taua (born February 15, 2000) is an American professional football running back for the Columbus Aviators of the United Football League (UFL). He played college football for the Nevada Wolf Pack.

== Early life ==
Taua was born in Lompoc, California, as one of six children to Faletui and Taua Taua. He attended high school in Lompoc where he played outside linebacker and running back from 2014 to 2017 with the Lompoc Braves. Taua totaled 73 touchdowns including 26 touchdowns made in his senior year. He also totaled as many as 200 career tackles. In his junior year, Taua earned the 2016 All-Area MVP award. He also became a three-time Los Padres League MVP winner. Rated a four-star recruitment prospect, Taua received as many as ten scholarship offers.

== College career ==
Taua committed to the University of Nevada and joined the field in 2018. As a freshman running back with the Nevada Wolf Pack, Taua played in all 13 games. During his freshman season, Taua led the Wolf Pack with 872 rushing yards and placed second with six rushing touchdowns. During his junior season in 2020, Taua earned All-Mountain West Second Team honors and was on pre-season watchlists to receive the Doak Walker and Paul Hornung Awards. During his senior season in 2021, Taua played in all 13 games, finishing with a season total of six rushing touchdowns. In his fifth and final year at Nevada, Taua started in 11 of 12 games and earned an All-Mountain West Honorable Mention. While at Nevada, Taua was a General studies major. Taua entered the 2023 NFL draft.

=== Statistics ===
| Year | Team | Games | | Rushing | | | | Receiving | | | |
| Year | Team | GP | GS | Att | Yards | Avg | TD | Rec | Yards | Avg | TD |
|---|---|---|---|---|---|---|---|---|---|---|---|
| 2018 | Nevada | 13 | 4 | 178 | 872 | 4.9 | 6 | 22 | 202 | 9.2 | 1 |
| 2019 | Nevada | 13 | 10 | 196 | 807 | 4.1 | 6 | 30 | 185 | 6.2 | 0 |
| 2020 | Nevada | 8 | 8 | 114 | 675 | 5.9 | 4 | 31 | 214 | 6.9 | 1 |
| 2021 | Nevada | 13 | 13 | 150 | 730 | 4.9 | 6 | 39 | 296 | 7.6 | 1 |
| 2022 | Nevada | 12 | 9 | 217 | 911 | 4.2 | 11 | 41 | 295 | 7.2 | 1 |
| Career | | 59 | 44 | 855 | 3,995 | 4.7 | 33 | 163 | 1,192 | 7.3 | 4 |

== Professional career ==
Pre-draft measurables
| Height | Weight | Arm length | Hand span | Wingspan | 40-yard dash | 10-yard split | 20-yard split | 20-yard shuttle | Three-cone drill | Vertical jump | Broad jump | Bench press |
|---|---|---|---|---|---|---|---|---|---|---|---|---|
| 5 ft 8 1/2 in (1.74 m) | 204 lb (93 kg) | 28 1/4 in (0.72 m) | 9 1/4 in (0.23 m) | 5 ft 10 5/8 in (1.79 m) | 4.69 s | 1.63 s | 2.75 s | 4.44 s | 7.40 s | 32.5 in (0.83 m) | 9 ft 0 in (2.74 m) | 20 reps |
All values from Pro Day

On May 1, 2023, Taua participated in the Philadelphia Eagles' team rookie minicamp.

=== Michigan Panthers ===
Taua signed with the Michigan Panthers and played his first game on June 10, 2023. He re-signed with the Panthers and played in two games during the 2024 season.

On March 20, 2025, Taua was released by the Panthers and re-signed on April 10. He would later become a starting running back for the Panthers.

=== Cleveland Browns ===
On July 26, 2025, Taua signed with the Cleveland Browns. On August 21, Taua was waived by the Browns.

=== Michigan Panthers (second stint) ===
On September 18, 2025, Taua re-signed with the Panthers.

=== Columbus Aviators ===
On January 13, 2026, Taua was selected by the Columbus Aviators in the 2026 UFL draft.

== USFL/UFL career statistics ==
| Year | Team | League | Games | | Rushing | | | | | Receiving | | | | |
| Year | Team | League | GP | GS | Att | Yds | Avg | Lng | TD | Rec | Yds | Avg | Lng | TD |
|---|---|---|---|---|---|---|---|---|---|---|---|---|---|---|
| 2023 | MICH | USFL | 1 | 0 | 0 | 0 | 0.0 | 0 | 0 | 0 | 0 | 0.0 | 0 | 0 |
| 2024 | MICH | UFL | 2 | 0 | 8 | 26 | 3.3 | 12 | 0 | 0 | 0 | 0.0 | 0 | 0 |
| 2025 | MICH | UFL | 7 | 4 | 81 | 357 | 4.4 | 21 | 6 | 9 | 76 | 8.4 | 25 | 0 |
| 2026 | CLB | UFL | 10 | 3 | 65 | 311 | 4.8 | 22 | 3 | 15 | 92 | 6.1 | 17 | 0 |
| Career | | | 20 | 7 | 154 | 694 | 4.5 | 22 | 9 | 24 | 168 | 7.0 | 25 | 0 |

== Personal life ==
Taua has two sisters named Lagi and Tasi. His older brother Vai Taua previously played college football at Nevada before signing with the Buffalo Bills and Seattle Seahawks during the 2011 and 2012 NFL seasons. Taua's brother Ainuu also played college football for the UCLA Bruins. Taua named Junior Seau as his sports hero.
