= Malik Turner (American football) =

American football player (born 1996)

Profile
- Position: Wide receiver

Personal information
- Born: January 30, 1996 (age 30); Springfield, Illinois, U.S.
- Listed height: 6 ft 2 in (1.88 m)
- Listed weight: 202 lb (92 kg)

Career information
- High school: Sacred Heart-Griffin (Springfield, Illinois)
- College: Illinois (2014–2017)
- NFL draft: 2018: undrafted

Career history
- Seattle Seahawks (2018–2019); Green Bay Packers (2020)*; Dallas Cowboys (2020–2021); San Francisco 49ers (2022); Las Vegas Raiders (2022)*; Houston Texans (2022)*; Indianapolis Colts (2023)*; San Francisco 49ers (2024)*; Michigan Panthers (2025); San Francisco 49ers (2025–2026)
- * Offseason or practice squad member only

Career NFL statistics as of 2023
- Receptions: 29
- Receiving yards: 414
- Receiving touchdowns: 4
- Stats at Pro Football Reference

Malik Turner (born January 30, 1996) is an American professional football wide receiver. He played college football for the Illinois Fighting Illini, and was signed by the Seattle Seahawks in 2018 as an undrafted free agent. He has also played for the Dallas Cowboys and the Michigan Panthers of the United Football League (UFL).

== Early life ==
Turner attended Sacred Heart-Griffin High School, where he played football and basketball. He received All-Central State Eight honors as a sophomore and junior.

As a senior, he tallied 69 receptions for 1,378 yards (19.9-yard avg.) and 22 touchdowns, while contributing to a 14-0 record and an IHSA Class 5A state championship. He received Central State Eight Conference Player of the Year honors.

== College career ==
Turner accepted a football scholarship from the University of Illinois. As a true freshman, he appeared in 13 games with 5 starts at wide receiver. He registered 25 receptions for 256 yards and one touchdown. He had 6 receptions for 84 yards against Louisiana Tech University.

As a sophomore, he appeared in 12 games with 10 starts. He posted 39 receptions for 510 yards (second on the team) and 3 receiving touchdowns (tied for the team lead). He had 11 catches for 126 yards against the University of Minnesota.

As a junior, he started 11 games and missed one contest with an injury. He led the team with 48 receptions, 712 yards and 6 receiving touchdowns. He had 11 receptions and 164 yards against Northwestern University. He made 9 receptions for 107 yards against Western Michigan University. He was named honorable-mention All-Big Ten.

As a senior, he started 9 out of 10 games. He missed 2 games with an injury. He collected 31 receptions (tied for the team lead), 326 receiving yards (second on the team) and 2 touchdowns.

He finished his college career with 143 receptions (ninth in school history), 1,804 receiving yards (ninth in school history) and 10 receiving touchdowns.

== Professional career ==
Pre-draft measurables
Height	Weight	Arm length	Hand span	Wingspan	Bench press
6 ft 2 in (1.88 m)	202 lb (92 kg)	32 in (0.81 m)	9 1/4 in (0.23 m)	6 ft 6 1/2 in (1.99 m)	17 reps
All values from Pro Day

=== Seattle Seahawks ===
After an unsuccessful tryout at a minicamp with the Green Bay Packers, Turner was signed by the Seattle Seahawks as an undrafted free agent on July 29, 2018. He was cut by the Seahawks at the end of training camp but was re-signed by the team to their practice squad on September 10. Turner was promoted to the Seahawks' active roster on October 31. Turner made his NFL debut on November 4 in a 17–25 loss against the Los Angeles Chargers. Turner caught his first career pass, a 19-yard reception from Russell Wilson, in the Seahawks' 30–27 win over the Carolina Panthers on November 25. He was waived on December 22, and re-signed to the practice squad and was subsequently promoted back to the active roster on January 1, 2019. In his rookie season, Turner caught two passes for 20 yards in six games played.

In a Monday Night Football game on November 11, 2019 against the San Francisco 49ers, after an injury to Tyler Lockett, Turner caught two passes for 35 yards, both in overtime. Turner caught a 33-yard pass from Wilson for his first career touchdown on November 24, in a 17–9 win over the Philadelphia Eagles.

During the team's 2019 Divisional round game against the Green Bay Packers, Turner dropped a critical catch while wide open.

On April 14, 2020, after originally receiving an exclusive-rights free agent tender, the Seahawks rescinded the tender, making Turner a free agent.

=== Green Bay Packers ===
On August 12, 2020, Turner signed with the Green Bay Packers. He was waived by the Packers on September 5.

=== Dallas Cowboys ===
On September 6, 2020, Turner was claimed off waivers by the Dallas Cowboys, to play on the special teams units, helping to offset the loss of wide receiver Ventell Bryant to a knee injury. He played in the first four games of the season, before being declared inactive in the next 12 contests. He appeared in six games and registered two special teams tackles.

On March 19, 2021, Turner was re-signed to a one-year contract by the Cowboys. He was having problems with a turf toe in training camp and suffered a foot injury in the last preseason game against the Jacksonville Jaguars. On September 2, he was placed on injured reserve to start the season. He was activated on October 2. Turner served as a backup during the season, with his most notable performance coming in Week 9 against the Denver Broncos, where he almost made NFL history, by just missing a blocked punt in the third quarter (it didn't count because the Cowboys touched the ball after it crossed the line of scrimmage), that would've made him the first player ever to record two touchdown receptions and a blocked punt in a single-game. In Week 16 against the Washington Football Team, he had three receptions (including a 61-yard catch-and-run) for 82 yards and a touchdown, after playing just 13 offensive snaps. Turner finished the season with 12 receptions for 149 yards, three touchdowns, and one special teams tackle.

=== San Francisco 49ers ===
On April 11, 2022, the San Francisco 49ers signed Turner to a one-year contract. He was waived on August 30, and was re-signed to the practice squad the following day. Turner was released by San Francisco on November 1.

=== Las Vegas Raiders ===
On November 4, 2022, the Las Vegas Raiders signed Turner to their practice squad. He was released on December 20.

=== Houston Texans ===
On December 23, 2022, Turner was signed to the Houston Texans' practice squad.

=== Indianapolis Colts ===
On February 24, 2023, Turner signed with the Indianapolis Colts. He was waived/injured on August 18, and placed on injured reserve.

=== San Francisco 49ers (second stint) ===
On July 25, 2024, Turner signed with the San Francisco 49ers, but was placed on injured reserve on August 6 and was released two days later with an injury settlement. On October 23, Turner signed with the 49ers' practice squad. He was released by San Francisco on November 6.

=== Michigan Panthers ===
On January 8, 2025, Turner signed with the Michigan Panthers of the United Football League (UFL). In the 2025 UFL Championship Game, Turner would set a UFL record with 168 receiving yards and three touchdowns in the loss to the DC Defenders. His contract was terminated on August 12, in order to allow him to sign with an NFL team.

=== San Francisco 49ers (third stint) ===
On August 13, 2025, Turner signed with the San Francisco 49ers. He was released on August 26 as part of final roster cuts and re-signed to the practice squad the next day. On January 20, 2026, Turner signed a reserve/futures contract with San Francisco.

On August 30, 2026, Turner was released by the 49ers as a part of final roster cuts. On October 1, he was re-signed to the practice squad. On October 27, Turner was released.

== NFL career statistics ==
=== Regular season ===
Year	Team	Games		Receiving					Fumbles	
Year	Team	GP	GS	Rec	Yds	Avg	Lng	TD	FUM	Lost
2018	SEA	6	0	2	20	10.0	19	0	0	0
2019	SEA	15	3	15	245	16.3	33	1	0	0
2020	DAL	6	0	0	0	0.0	0	0	0	0
2021	DAL	14	0	12	149	12.4	61	3	0	0
Total		41	3	29	414	14.3	61	4	0	0
Source: NFL.com

=== Postseason ===
Year	Team	Games		Receiving					Fumbles	
Year	Team	GP	GS	Rec	Yds	Avg	Lng	TD	FUM	Lost
2019	SEA	1	1	0	0	0.0	0	0	0	0
Total		1	1	0	0	0.0	0	0	0	0
Source: pro-football-reference.com

== UFL career statistics ==
=== Regular season ===
Year	Team	Games		Receiving					Fumbles	
Year	Team	GP	GS	Rec	Yds	Avg	Lng	TD	FUM	Lost
2025	MICH	10	8	40	365	9.12	25	4	0	0
Total		10	8	40	365	9.12	4	0	0	0

=== Postseason ===
Year	Team	Games		Receiving					Fumbles	
Year	Team	GP	GS	Rec	Yds	Avg	Lng	TD	FUM	Lost
2025	MICH	2	2	16	267	16.69	76	4	0	0
Total		2	2	16	267	16.69	4	0	0	0
