= Siaosi Mariner =

American football player (born 1998)

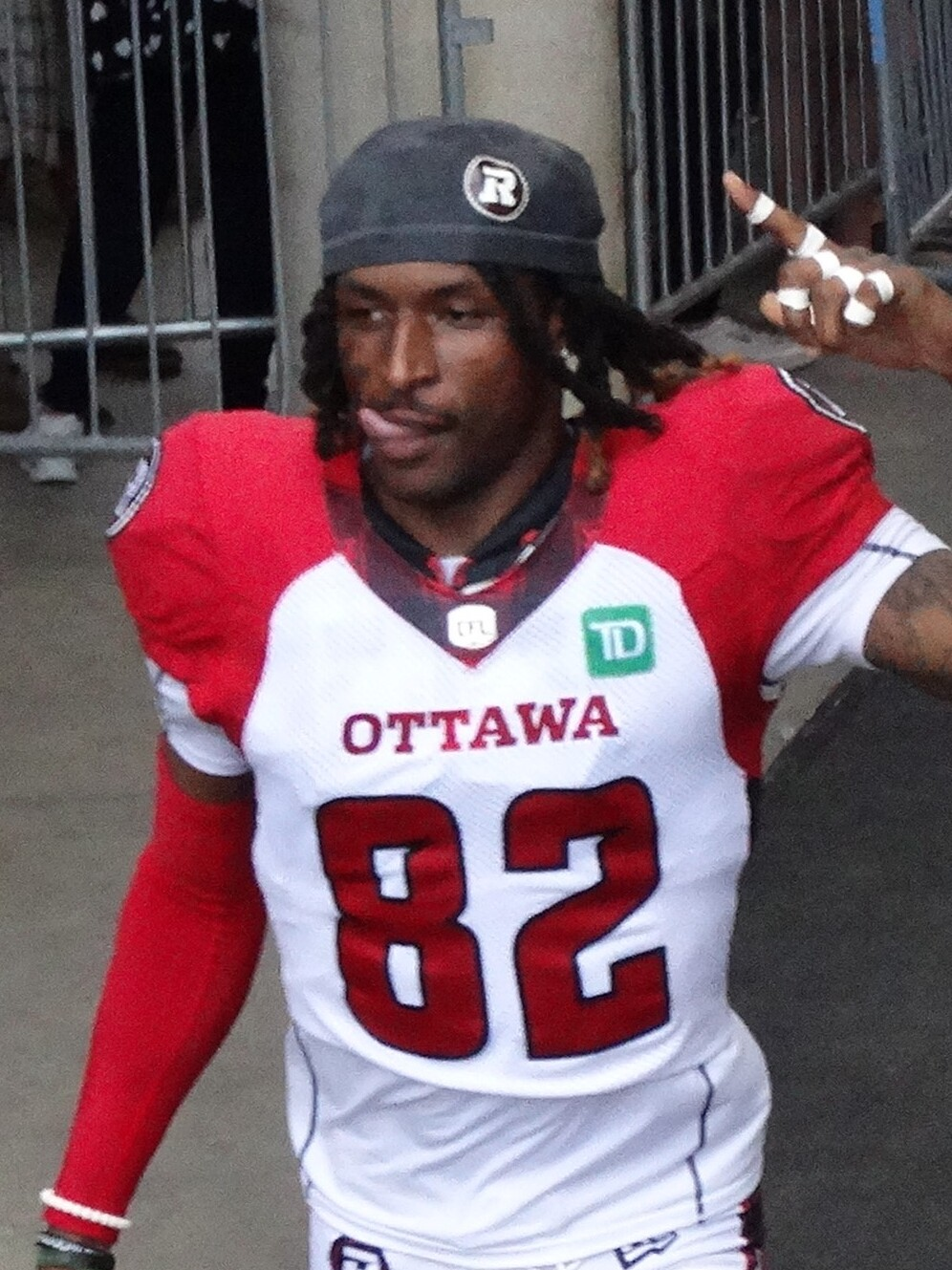
- Mariner with the Ottawa Redblacks in 2023

Profile
- Position: Wide receiver

Personal information
- Born: January 25, 1997 (age 29); Tustin, California, U.S.
- Listed height: 6 ft 2 in (1.88 m)
- Listed weight: 190 lb (86 kg)

Career information
- High school: Tustin (CA)
- College: Utah, Utah State
- NFL draft: 2020: undrafted

Career history
- Las Vegas Raiders (2020)*; Baltimore Ravens (2021)*; Ottawa Redblacks (2022–2023); Michigan Panthers (2024–2025); Saskatchewan Roughriders (2025)
- * Offseason or practice squad member only

Awards and highlights
- Grey Cup champion (2025); UFL receiving yards leader (2025); Second-team All-Mountain West (2019)

Career CFL statistics as of 2025
- Receptions: 26
- Receiving yards: 317
- Touchdowns: 2
- Stats at CFL.ca

George Siaosi Mariner (born January 25, 1997) is an American professional football wide receiver. He played college football at Utah and Utah State. He has been a member of the Las Vegas Raiders and Baltimore Ravens of the National Football League (NFL), the Michigan Panthers of the United Football League (UFL), and the Ottawa Redblacks and Saskatchewan Roughriders of the Canadian Football League (CFL).

== Early life ==
George Siaosi Mariner played high school football at Tustin High School in Tustin, California, as a cornerback and wide receiver. He earned second team MaxPreps all-state honors at cornerback in 2014. He also played basketball in high school.

== College career ==
=== Utah ===
Mariner played college football at Utah from 2016 to 2018 as a wide receiver. He redshirted in 2015.

He played in 13 games, starting seven, in 2016, recording 15 receptions for 183 yards and two touchdowns. He appeared in 11 games, starting 10, in 2017, catching 20 passes for 320 yards and one touchdown. Mariner played in 12 games, starting five, in 2018, totaling 17 receptions for 209 yards and one touchdown.

=== Utah State ===
Mariner transferred to play at Utah State in 2019. He started 13 games in 2019, catching 63 passes for 987 yards and 10 touchdowns, earning second team all-Mountain West Conference honors.

=== Statistics ===
Season	Team	Games		Receiving			
Season	Team	GP	GS	Rec	Yds	Avg	TD
2015	Utah	Redshirted (redshirt)					
2016	Utah	13	6	15	183	12.2	2
2017	Utah	11	10	20	393	19.7	1
2018	Utah	12	5	17	209	12.3	1
2019	Utah State	13	13	63	987	15.7	10
Career		49	34	115	1,772	15.4	14

== Professional career ==
=== Las Vegas Raiders ===
Mariner signed with the Las Vegas Raiders of the National Football League (NFL) on May 7, 2020, after going undrafted in the 2020 NFL draft. He was released by the Raiders on July 31, 2020.

=== Baltimore Ravens ===
Mariner was signed by the Baltimore Ravens of the NFL on August 9, 2021. He was released on August 30, 2021.

=== Ottawa Redblacks ===
Mariner signed with the Ottawa Redblacks of the Canadian Football League (CFL) on January 21, 2022. He was moved to the practice roster on June 5 and promoted to the active roster on October 13, 2022. He played in three games, all starts, for the Redblacks in 2022, catching eight passes for 98 yards and one touchdown. Mariner began the 2023 season on injured reserve but was upgraded to the active roster after the Redblacks cut Quan Bray on June 29, 2023. He moved between the active roster and single game injury list (healthy scratch) several times during the 2023 season. He dressed in 13 games, starting nine, in 2023, recording 18 receptions for 219 yards and one touchdown. He became a free agent after the season.

=== Michigan Panthers ===
On April 4, 2024, Mariner signed with the Michigan Panthers of the United Football League (UFL). He re-signed with the team on August 13. On April 26, 2025, Mariner had his first 100-yard game against the St. Louis Battlehawks. He finished the game with six catches for 111 yards.

=== Saskatchewan Roughriders ===
On October 21, 2025, Mariner signed with the Saskatchewan Roughriders of the CFL. He signed a contract extension with the team on January 2, 2026, after spending the remainder of the 2025 season on the club's practice roster.

Mariner was part of a final round of roster cuts made by the Roughriders ahead of the 2026 season on May 30, 2026.

== Career statistics ==
CFL regular season

Season	Team	Games		Receiving			
Season	Team	GP	GS	Rec	Yds	Avg	TD
2022	OTT	3	3	8	98	12.3	1
2023	OTT	13	9	18	219	12.2	1
Career		16	12	26	317	12.2	2

UFL regular season

Season	Team	Games		Receiving			
Season	Team	GP	GS	Rec	Yds	Avg	TD
2024	MICH	7	4	27	346	12.8	2
2025	MICH	10	9	31	528	17.0	1
Career		17	13	58	874	15.1	3

UFL postseason

Season	Team	Games		Receiving			
Season	Team	GP	GS	Rec	Yds	Avg	TD
2024	MICH	1	0	4	60	15.0	1
2025	MICH	0	0	0	0	0.0	0
Career		1	0	4	60	15.0	1
