= Bryce Perkins =

American gridiron football player (born 1996)

- Perkins with the Winnipeg Blue Bombers in 2026

No. 9 – Winnipeg Blue Bombers
- Position: Quarterback
- Roster status: Active
- CFL status: American

Personal information
- Born: December 20, 1996 (age 29); Chandler, Arizona, U.S.
- Listed height: 6 ft 2 in (1.88 m)
- Listed weight: 231 lb (105 kg)

Career information
- High school: Chandler
- College: Arizona State (2015–2016); Arizona Western (2017); Virginia (2018–2019)
- NFL draft: 2020: undrafted

Career history
- Los Angeles Rams (2020–2022); Michigan Panthers (2024–2025); Carolina Panthers (2025)*; Winnipeg Blue Bombers (2026–present)
- * Offseason or practice squad member only

Awards and highlights
- Super Bowl champion (LVI); UFL MVP (2025); UFL Offensive Player of the Year (2025); All-UFL Team (2025); 2× Dudley Award (2018, 2019); Second-team All-ACC (2019)

Career NFL statistics
- Passing attempts: 34
- Passing completions: 19
- Completion percentage: 55.9%
- TD–INT: 1–2
- Passing yards: 161
- Passer rating: 53.7
- Rushing yards: 90
- Stats at Pro Football Reference

Bryce Perkins (born December 20, 1996) is an American professional football quarterback for the Winnipeg Blue Bombers of the Canadian Football League (CFL). He played college football at Arizona State, Arizona Western, and Virginia before signing with the Los Angeles Rams as an undrafted free agent in 2020.

== Early life ==
Perkins attended Chandler High School in Chandler, Arizona. As a senior, he led Chandler to their first state championship victory since 1949. During his high school career he passed for 5,332 yards with 70 touchdowns and had 26 rushing touchdowns. Perkins committed to Arizona State University to play college football.

== College career ==
=== Arizona State ===
Perkins redshirted his first year at Arizona State in 2015 and missed 2016 due to a broken neck.

=== Arizona Western College ===
He transferred to Arizona Western College in 2017. In his lone season there he passed for 1,311 yards and seven touchdowns and rushed for 353 yards and four touchdowns.

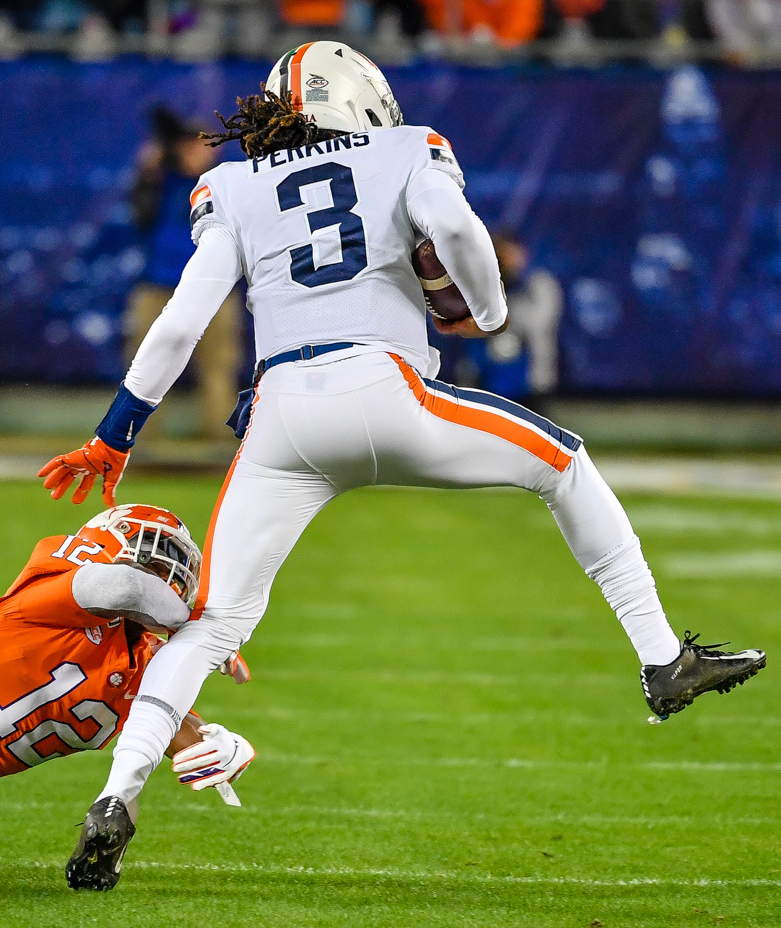
Perkins in college at Virginia in 2019

=== Virginia ===
In 2018, Perkins transferred to the University of Virginia. Prior to the season, he was named the team's starter. He started all 13 games and set the school record for total offense in a single season with 3,603 yards and 34 touchdowns. He completed 225 of 349 passes for 2,680 yards with 25 touchdowns, nine interceptions and rushed for 923 yards and nine touchdowns. Perkins returned to Virginia as the starting quarterback for the 2019 season. Perkins started all 14 games for Virginia in 2019 and finished the season with 319 completions out of 495 pass attempts (64.4%) for 3,540 passing yards, 22 touchdowns, and 12 interceptions. He also had 227 carries for 769 rushing yards (3.4 yards per carry) and 11 touchdowns.

== Professional career ==
Pre-draft measurables
Height	Weight
6 ft 2 1/4 in (1.89 m)	215 lb (98 kg)
All values from Pro Day

=== Los Angeles Rams ===
Perkins signed with the Los Angeles Rams as an undrafted free agent on April 25, 2020. He was waived by the team during final roster cuts on September 5, 2020, and signed to the practice squad the next day. He was elevated to the active roster on January 2 and 15, 2021, for the team's week 17 and divisional playoff games against the Arizona Cardinals and Green Bay Packers, and reverted to the practice squad after each game. On January 18, 2021, Perkins signed a reserve/futures contract with the Rams. Perkins was among players who received a Super Bowl ring for the Rams victory over the Cincinnati Bengals in Super Bowl LVI. He made his NFL debut in 2022 filling in for Matthew Stafford in weeks 10–12 against the Cardinals, New Orleans Saints, and Kansas City Chiefs following injuries to Stafford and backup John Wolford. He threw the first touchdown pass of his professional career to Van Jefferson on November 27, 2022 in a loss to the Chiefs.

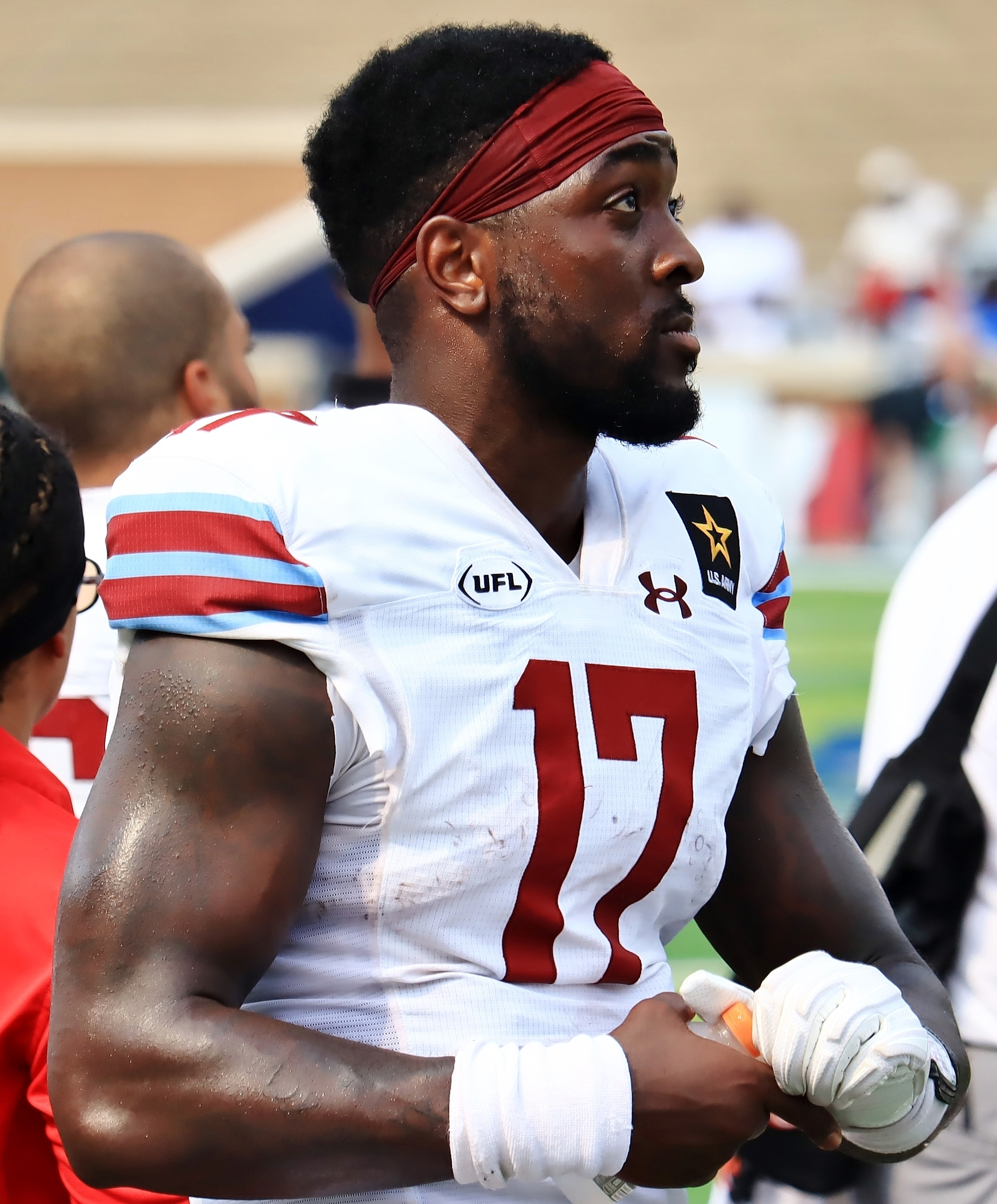
Perkins with the Michigan Panthers in 2024

=== Michigan Panthers ===
On April 24, 2024 (after their Week 4 game), Perkins signed with the Michigan Panthers of the United Football League (UFL). He was placed on Injured reserve on June 4. He re-signed with the team on August 26, 2024. In week 1 of 2025, Perkins completed 16-of-19 passes for 163 yards and one touchdown in a 26–12 victory over the Memphis Showboats. Perkins started the following week against the Birmingham Stallions, but the offense managed just one touchdown in the 12–21 defeat. The following week quarterback Danny Etling received the start, but was replaced by Perkins after sustaining an injury. Perkins completed 17-of-23 passes for 193 yards and added two touchdowns on the ground to help the Panthers come from behind and defeat the San Antonio Brahmas 26–23. For his performance he was named UFL offensive player of the week. In week 4, Perkins completed 15-of-22 passes for 200 yards and two touchdowns. He also added 45 rushing yards, earning him his second straight offensive player of the week. In week 5, Perkins would start the game 11-of-12 passing for 100 yards and a touchdown, but would be replaced by Danny Etling in the second quarter. Perkins would re-enter the game trailing 17–6, and would lead the Panthers to 3 consecutive scores. Perkins would finish 21-of-25 passing for 235 yards and 2 touchdowns in the 32–27 loss. The following week against the DC Defenders, Perkins would lead the Panthers to a 38–14 win. He completed 13-of-18 passes for 188 yards and two touchdowns, while also having 90 rushing yards and a rushing touchdown. For his performance, Perkins would win his third offensive player of the week. At the end of the regular season, Perkins was announced for the 2025 All-UFL team. On June 10, 2025, Perkins was named the UFL's Offensive Player of the Year. Three days later, Perkins was named UFL MVP.

=== Carolina Panthers ===
On August 18, 2025, Perkins signed with the Carolina Panthers. He was waived by the Panthers on August 25.

=== Winnipeg Blue Bombers ===
On November 25, 2025, Perkins signed with the Winnipeg Blue Bombers of the Canadian Football League.

== Career statistics ==
=== NFL ===
Legend
	UFL MVP & OPOTY
	Won the Super Bowl
	Led the league
**Bold**	Career high

Year	Team	Games			Passing								Rushing			
Year	Team	GP	GS	Record	Cmp	Att	Pct	Yds	Y/A	TD	Int	Rtg	Att	Yds	Avg	TD
2020	LAR	0	0	—	DNP											
2021	LAR	0	0	—	DNP											
2022	LAR	5	1	0–1	19	34	55.9	161	4.7	1	2	53.7	19	90	4.7	0
Career		5	1	0–1	19	34	55.9	161	4.7	1	2	53.7	19	90	4.7	0

=== UFL ===
Regular season statistics
Year	Team	Games			Passing								Rushing			
Year	Team	GP	GS	Record	Cmp	Att	Pct	Yds	Y/A	TD	Int	Rtg	Att	Yds	Avg	TD
2024	MICH	5	0	—	30	38	78.9	343	9.0	2	1	110.9	20	181	9.1	2
2025	MICH	7	6	4–2	109	158	69.0	1,342	8.5	9	2	108.7	47	269	5.7	5
Career		12	6	4–2	139	196	70.9	1,685	8.6	11	3	109.3	67	450	6.7	7

Postseason statistics
Year	Team	Games			Passing								Rushing			
Year	Team	GP	GS	Record	Cmp	Att	Pct	Yds	Y/A	TD	Int	Rtg	Att	Yds	Avg	TD
2024	MICH	0	0	—	DNP											
2025	MICH	2	2	1–1	41	60	68.3	576	9.6	5	1	119.9	12	41	3.4	1
Career		2	2	1–1	41	60	68.3	576	9.6	5	1	119.9	12	41	3.4	1

=== CFL ===
Regular season statistics
Year	Team	Games			Passing								Rushing				
Year	Team	GP	GS	Record	Cmp	Att	Pct	Yds	Y/A	TD	Int	Rtg	Att	Yds	Avg	Lng	TD
2026	WPG	18	0	—	1	1	100.0	10	10.0	0	0	127.1	58	210	3.6	76	8
Career		18	0	—	1	1	100.0	10	10.0	0	0	127.1	58	210	3.6	76	8

=== College ===
Season	Team	Games			Passing							Rushing			
Season	Team	GP	GS	Record	Cmp	Att	Pct	Yds	TD	Int	Rtg	Att	Yds	Avg	TD
2015	Arizona State	0	0	—	Redshirted (redshirt)										
2016	Arizona State	0	0	—	Did not play due to injury										
2017	Arizona Western	9	9	8–1	114	180	63.3	1,311	7	8	128.5	69	353	5.1	4
2018	Virginia	13	13	8–5	225	349	64.5	2,680	25	9	147.5	212	923	4.4	9
2019	Virginia	14	14	9–5	320	496	64.5	3,538	22	12	134.2	227	769	3.4	11
Career		36	36	25–11	659	1,025	64.3	7,529	54	29	137.7	508	2,045	4.0	24

== Personal life ==
His father, Bruce Perkins, played fullback at Arizona State and briefly in the NFL. His great-uncle, Don Perkins, played eight seasons as a running back with the Dallas Cowboys. His older brother, Paul Perkins, was also a running back in the NFL. Perkins' cousin Kadyn Proctor currently plays guard for the Miami Dolphins.
