= Jaron Fairman =

American football player and coach (born 1984)

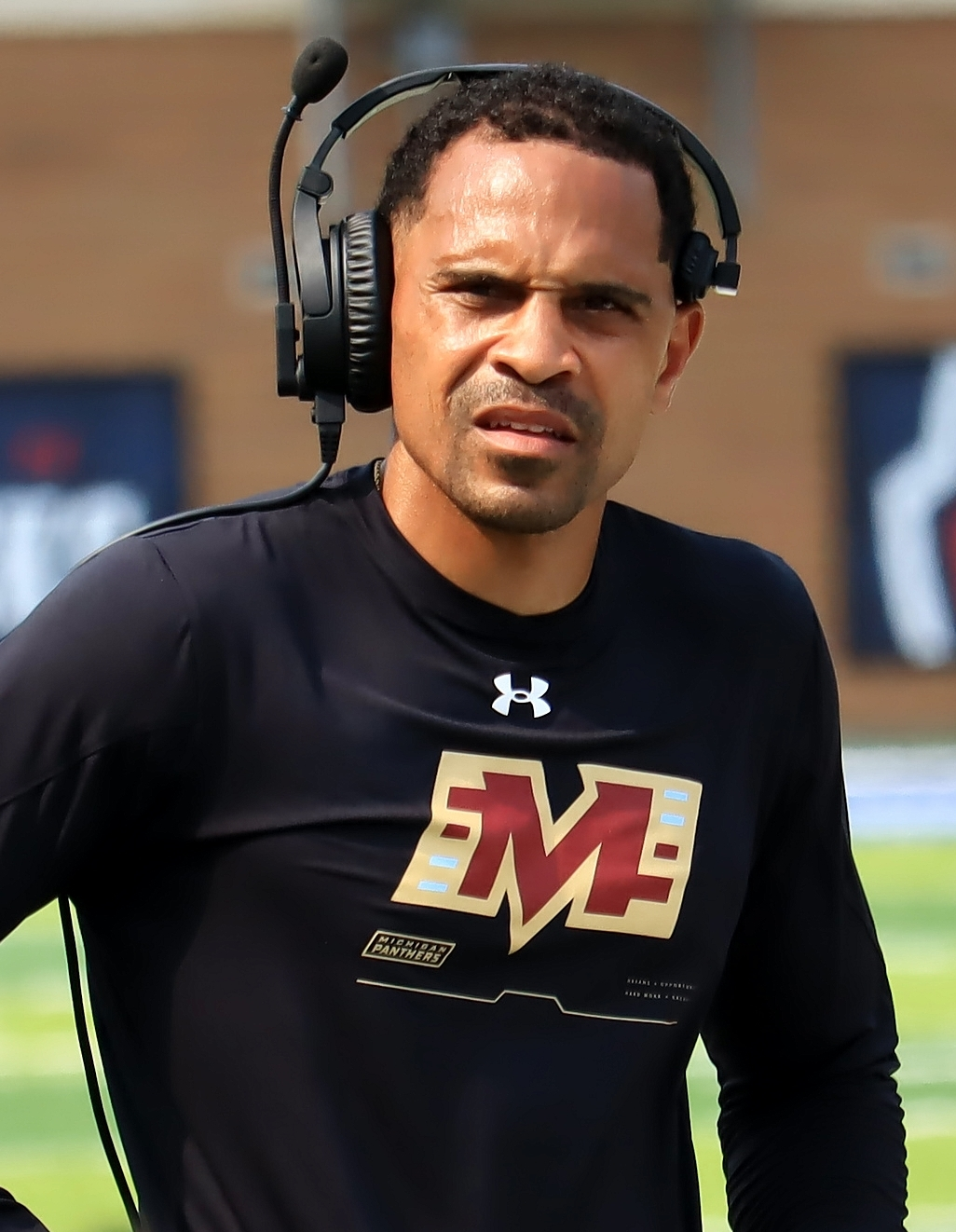
- Fairman with the Michigan Panthers in 2024

Personal information
- Born: November 12, 1984 (age 41); West Covina, California, U.S.

Career information
- College: Fresno State (2003–2006)
- NFL draft: 2007: undrafted

Career history

Coaching
- Nicholls State (2008) Special teams coordinator / wide receivers; Nicholls State (2009) Special teams coordinator / passing game coordinator / wide receivers; Nicholls State (2010) offensive coordinator / Special teams coordinator / wide receivers; Western State (CO) (2011) Special teams coordinator / wide receivers; Crespi HS (CA) (2012) Special teams coordinator / wide receivers; USC (2013–2015) Graduate assistant; Florida Atlantic (2018–2019) Special teams coordinator; Florida Atlantic (2020) Special teams coordinator / tight ends; Michigan Panthers (2023–2025) Special teams coordinator / wide receivers

Operations
- Florida Atlantic (2017) asst. dir. of player development; Ole Miss (2022) Analyst

Jaron Fairman (born December 12, 1984) is an American football coach and former wide receiver who was the special teams coordinator and wide receivers coach for the Michigan Panthers of the United Football League (UFL). He has previously coordinated special teams at Florida Atlantic University, Nicholls State University and Western Colorado University.

== Playing career ==
Fairman played wide receiver and was a key special teams contributor from 2003 to 2006 at Fresno State. He was a four-year letter winner, and was a team captain as a senior. Prior to Fresno State, Fairman was an all-state wide receiver and defensive back at South Hills High School in West Covina, California.

== Coaching career ==
=== Nicholls State ===
Following Fairman's playing career, He joined the staff at Nicholls State as the special teams coordinator and wide receivers coach. In 2009, his second season on staff, Fairman was promoted to passing game coordinator. In 2010, Fairman was again promoted, this time to Offensive coordinator.

=== 2011–2015 ===
In 2011, Fairman joined the staff at Western State College, now known as Western Colorado University, as the special teams coordinator and wide receivers coach. For the 2012 season, Fairman coached the Wide Receivers and Coordinated the special teams at Crespi High School in Encino, California. From 2013 to 2015, Fairman was a graduate assistant at USC, where he assisted with the special teams and offensive units.

=== Florida Atlantic ===
Fairman joined the FAU staff in 2017 as a player development assistant, and was promoted to special teams coordinator the following season. He was the first assistant in program history to focus solely on special teams. In 2019, Fairman's kick off team led Conference USA in kick return defense, and kicker Vladimir Rivas led the conference in total points scored. Fairman was relieved of his duties following the 2020 season.

=== Ole Miss ===
In March 2022, Fairman reunited with Kiffin when he joined his Ole Miss staff as an analyst.

=== Michigan Panthers ===
On March 15, 2023, Fairman was announced as the special teams coordinator and wide receivers coach for the Michigan Panthers of the United States Football League (USFL).

== Personal life ==
Fairman earned a bachelor's degree in health science and public health from Fresno State in 2007 and a master's degree in communication from USC in 2015.
