= Bruce Perkins =

American football player (born 1967)

No. 33
- Position: Fullback

Personal information
- Born: August 14, 1967 (age 59); Waterloo, Iowa, U.S.
- Listed height: 6 ft 2 in (1.88 m)
- Listed weight: 230 lb (104 kg)

Career information
- High school: Waterloo Central
- College: Arizona State
- NFL draft: 1990: undrafted

Career history
- Tampa Bay Buccaneers (1990); Indianapolis Colts (1991); Cleveland Browns (1992)*; Hamilton Tiger-Cats (1993-1994); Memphis Mad Dogs (1995)
- * Offseason or practice squad member only

Career NFL statistics
- Rushing yards: 47
- Rushing average: 2.8
- Receptions: 11
- Receiving yards: 83
- Receiving touchdowns: 2
- Stats at Pro Football Reference

Paul Kerry "Bruce" Perkins Sr. (born August 14, 1967) is an American former professional football player who was a fullback in the National Football League (NFL) and Canadian Football League (CFL). He played college football for Butler Community College and the Arizona State Sun Devils. He played in the NFL for the Tampa Bay Buccaneers and Indianapolis Colts before playing in the CFL with the Hamilton Tiger-Cats and Memphis Mad Dogs.

== Personal life ==
His older son, Paul Perkins, is a former NFL running back. His younger son, Bryce Perkins, was a quarterback for Arizona State and Virginia, and played in the NFL for the Los Angeles Rams. His uncle, Don Perkins, played eight seasons as a running back with the Dallas Cowboys.
