= Kedrick Whitehead Jr. =

American football player (born 1999)

Profile
- Position: Safety

Personal information
- Born: November 20, 1999 (age 26)
- Listed height: 5 ft 11 in (1.80 m)
- Listed weight: 206 lb (93 kg)

Career information
- High school: Middletown (Middletown, Delaware)
- College: Delaware (2018–2022)
- NFL draft: 2023: undrafted

Career history
- Tampa Bay Buccaneers (2023)*; Michigan Panthers (2024–2025); Columbus Aviators (2026)
- * Offseason or practice squad member only

Awards and highlights
- UFL Special Teams Player of the Year (2025); All-UFL team (2025); 4× All-CAA Team (2019–2022); Third-team All-American (2022)

Kedrick Whitehead Jr. (born November 20, 1999) is an American professional football safety. He played high school football at Middletown High school in Middletown, Delaware. He played college football at Delaware. In 2025, Whitehead was named the UFL Special Teams Player of the Year, and was named to the All-UFL team.

== College career ==
Whitehead played college football at Delaware, where he recorded 295 tackles in five seasons. Whitehead was also named to the All-CAA Team for 4 consecutive seasons.

== Professional career ==
Pre-draft measurables
Height	Weight	Arm length	Hand span	Wingspan	20-yard shuttle	Three-cone drill	Vertical jump	Broad jump	Bench press
5 ft 10 1/8 in (1.78 m)	199 lb (90 kg)	29 5/8 in (0.75 m)	9 3/8 in (0.24 m)	6 ft 0 7/8 in (1.85 m)	4.30 s	7.42 s	38.0 in (0.97 m)	9 ft 11 in (3.02 m)	24 reps
All values from Pro Day

=== Tampa Bay Buccaneers ===
After going undrafted in the 2023 NFL draft, Whitehead had a minicamp invite from the Tampa Bay Buccaneers, and was one of three players signed on May 15, 2023. He was released on August 30.

=== Michigan Panthers ===
On March 5, 2024, Whitehead signed with the Michigan Panthers of the United Football League (UFL).

On June 2, 2025, Whiethead was selected to the All-UFL team. On June 9, 2025, Whitehead was named the UFL Special Teams Player of the Year.

=== Columbus Aviators ===
On January 12, 2026, Whitehead was allocated to the Columbus Aviators of the United Football League (UFL).
