= Steve Kazor =

American football scout and former coach (born 1968)

Current position
- Title: Head coach and general manager
- Team: Michigan Arrows

Biographical details
- Born: 1948 (age 77–78); New Kensington, Pennsylvania, U.S.

Playing career
- 1966–1969: Westminster (UT)
- Position: Nose tackle

Coaching career (HC unless noted)
- 1970: Westminster (UT) (assistant)
- 1971–1972: Camden Military Academy (SC)
- 1973: College of Emporia (assistant)
- 1974: Texas–Arlington (assistant)
- 1975: Colorado State (DL)
- 1976: Southern Utah State (DC)
- 1977–1978: Texas (DB)
- 1979–1980: UTEP (LB/RC)
- 1982–1992: Chicago Bears (STC/DA/TE/AHC)
- 1993: Iowa Wesleyan {Nominated to NAtional Coach of the Year]
- 1994–1996: Detroit Lions (TE/OL/ST)
- 1998–1999: McPherson
- 2000–2003: Wayne State (MI)
- 2004–2005: DuPage
- 2006: Ottawa Renegades (OL)
- 2026: Michigan Arrows

Administrative career (AD unless noted)
- 1981: Dallas Cowboys (scout)
- 2007–2022: St. Louis / Los Angeles Rams (scout)
- 2023–2025: Michigan Panthers (GM)

Head coaching record
- Overall: 33–40 (college)

Steven Kazor (born 1948) is an American football executive, scout, and coach who is the current head coach and general manager of the Michigan Arrows of the Continental Football League. Kazor served as the head football coach at Iowa Wesleyan College (1993), McPherson College (1998–1999), and Wayne State University (2000–2003), compiling a career college football head coaching record of 33–40. He was assistant coach in the NFL with the Chicago Bears from 1982 to 1992 and the Detroit Lions from 1994 to 1996. Working under head coach Mike Ditka, Kazor was a member of the coaching staff for the 1985 Chicago Bears, champions of Super Bowl XX. He served as the general manager of the Michigan Panthers of the United Football League from 2023 to 2025.

== Early life and playing career ==
Kazor was born in 1948 in New Kensington, Pennsylvania. A native of Pittsburgh, Pennsylvania, he graduated from Rancho High School in North Las Vegas, Nevada. He attended Westminster College—now known as Westminster University—in Salt Lake City, where he was freshman class president and lettered for four years on the football team, playing as a nose tackle, and was tri-captain in his senior year.

== Coaching career ==
After graduating from Westminster College, Kazor coached at Camden Military Academy in Camden, South Carolina. In 1973, he was named head football coach at the College of Emporia in Emporia, Kansas, but the school was closed in 1974. Kazor spent the 1974 season at the University of Texas at Arlington as an assistant coach. The following year he was hired as defensive line coach at Colorado State University. After working for a year at Colorado State under head coach Sark Arslanian, Kazor was hired in 1976 as the defensive coordinator at Southern Utah State College—now known as Southern Utah University—under head coach Tom Kingsford. In 1977, he moved to the University of Texas at Austin as an aide to head coach Fred Akers.

Kazor was the linebackers coach at the University of Texas at El Paso (UTEP) in 1979 and 1980 under head coach Bill Michael before moving to the National Football League (NFL) in 1981 to work as a scout for the Dallas Cowboys. In 1982, he was hired as the special teams coach for the NFL's Chicago Bears by newly appointed head coach Mike Ditka. He won Super Bowl XX with the team.

After 11 seasons with the Bears, Kazor returned to the college football ranks, in 1993, when he was hired as the head football coach at Iowa Wesleyan College—now known as Iowa Wesleyan University. Kazor was the head football coach at McPherson College in McPherson, Kansas for the 1998 and 1999 seasons. His coaching record at McPherson was 12–8. In February 2000, Kazor was named the head football coach at Wayne State University in Detroit, Michigan.

Kazor was inducted into the Alle-Kiski Valley Sports Hall of Fame in 2005.

== Head coaching record ==
=== College ===
Year	Team	Overall	Conference	Standing	Bowl/playoffs	NAIA^{#}
Iowa Wesleyan Tigers (NAIA Division I independent) (1993)
1993	Iowa Wesleyan	8–3				12
Iowa Wesleyan:		8–3				
McPherson Bulldogs (Kansas Collegiate Athletic Conference) (1998–1999)
1998	McPherson	5–5	4–4	T–4th		
1999	McPherson	7–3	5–3	T–3rd		
McPherson:		12–8	9–7			
Wayne State Warriors (Great Lakes Intercollegiate Athletic Conference) (2000–2003)
2000	Wayne State	4–6	4–6	T–8th		
2001	Wayne State	3–7	3–6	T–7th		
2002	Wayne State	3–8	3–7	T–9th		
2003	Wayne State	3–8	2–8	T–11th		
Wayne State:		13–29	12–27			
Total:		33–40				
^{#}Rankings from final NAIA Division I poll.
