= Oklahoma City Stadium =

Planned stadium in Oklahoma, United States

- Interactive map of Oklahoma City Stadium
- Location: Oklahoma City, Oklahoma
- Coordinates: 35°27′36.1″N 97°30′36.8″W
- Owner: City of Oklahoma City
- Capacity: 10,000

Construction
- Cost: $71 million
- Architect: Populous

Tenants
- OKC United (2028–); Oklahoma UFL team (UFL) (2028–future)

Oklahoma City Stadium, also known as MAPS 4 Multipurpose Stadium, is a planned multi-purpose stadium to be constructed in Oklahoma City that will be home to OKC United of the USL Championship and a future team in the United Football League. Projected to have a capacity of 10,000, its opening is planned for January 2028. It will be owned by the city of Oklahoma City.

== History ==
OKC Energy FC played their 2014 inaugural season at Bishop McGuinness Catholic High School's Pribil Stadium. From 2015 to 2022, the club moved to Taft Stadium. In November 2022, the USL Championship was enforcing its policy to have all USL Championship clubs playing on home fields of at least 110 x 70 yards, starting in 2023, with no exceptions, as part of its broader efforts to improve the match experience for players and fans. With Taft Stadium not meeting this requirement, nor any other stadium in or near OKC, the Energy voluntarily paused operations until the Energy could find a viable stadium meeting the league's requirements.

On December 10, 2019, Oklahoma City voters approved MAPS 4, a sales tax extension planned to fund 16 major projects over 8 years. MAPS 4 allocates $41 million towards the construction of a multipurpose stadium that would serve as the new home field for the Energy. After city government's search for a final site and design for the stadium concluded, a location was identified near lower Bricktown where the new Oklahoma City Thunder arena and new transit area is to be built.

Plans for the stadium include seating for approximately 12,300, which will be part of a larger sports and entertainment district. Echo Investment Capital will develop the 51 acres surrounding the nine-acre stadium site.

On April 9, 2026, the United Football League announced that it will expand to Oklahoma City in 2028 with Oklahoma City Stadium being the team's home stadium.
