= Utah UFL team =

Professional American football team

General information
- Founded: September 23, 2026; 0 days ago
- Stadium: America First Field; Sandy, Utah
- Website: www.theufl.com/utah

Personnel
- Owner: League owned

Team history
- Utah UFL team (2028–present)

League / conference affiliations
- United Football League (2028)

The Utah UFL team are a professional American football team based in Sandy, Utah, a suburb of Salt Lake City. The team will compete in the United Football League (UFL). They are planned to begin play in 2028. The team, along with the rest of the league, is owned and operated by a consortium led by Mike Repole, and will play their home games at America First Field.

== History ==
The Utah UFL team was announced on September 23, 2026. It is one of two planned expansion teams expected to begin play in 2028, along with the Oklahoma UFL team.

The Salt Lake metropolitan area had previously hosted the Salt Lake Stallions, a team in the Alliance of American Football, in 2019; the Stallions were hampered by harsh winter weather (the AAF, whose teams were otherwise all based south of the 35th parallel, played its games in February and March, as opposed to the April to May schedule of the UFL) and a resulting attendance among the AAF's worst. Coincidentally, the UFL holds a trademark for a Stallions brand of professional football, a brand for which Repole, whose other investments include a horse racing stable, has acknowledged to have a fondness; he had wanted to use the brand for what became the Louisville Kings but was unable to do so because of the preexistence of the Birmingham Stallions, which Repole shut down after the 2026 season. The UFL's trademark on the Stallions name is due for renewal in November 2026.
