= Michigan Panthers (2022) =

Football team of the United Football League (2024)

- Logo
- Uniforms

General information
- Founded: November 22, 2021; 4 years ago
- Folded: 2025
- Stadium: Ford Field; Detroit, Michigan
- Colors: Royal plum, champagne silver, light blue
- Mascot: Pablo
- Website: www.theufl.com/teams/michigan

Personnel
- Owner: League owned
- General manager: Steve Kazor
- Head coach: Mike Nolan

Team history
- Michigan Panthers (2022–2025)

Home fields
- Protective Stadium/Legion Field (2022); Ford Field (2023‍–‍2025)

League / conference affiliations
- United States Football League (2022–2023): North Division (2022–2023); United Football League (2024–2025): USFL Conference (2024–2025)

Championships
- Conference championships: 1: USFL: 2025

Playoff appearances (3)
- USFL: 2023; UFL: 2024, 2025

The Michigan Panthers were a professional American football team based in Detroit. The Panthers competed in the United Football League (UFL) as a member of the USFL Conference. While they were active, the team was owned and operated by Dwayne Johnson's Alpha Acquico and Fox Corporation. The team played its home games at Ford Field in Downtown Detroit, which also hosts the Detroit Lions of the National Football League (NFL).

== History ==
The Michigan Panthers were one of eight teams that were officially announced as a USFL franchise on The Herd with Colin Cowherd on November 22, 2021. On January 27, 2022, it was announced on The Herd with Colin Cowherd that former NFL head coach Jeff Fisher was named the head coach and general manager of the Panthers.

The Panthers selected Michigan quarterback Shea Patterson with the first overall pick in the 2022 USFL draft. In the first two games of 2022, the Panthers lost to the Houston Gamblers and New Jersey Generals. On May 1, 2022, the team won their first ever game with a 24–0 win at Protective Stadium against the Pittsburgh Maulers. Losses resumed after that, the Panthers' only other win of the season was against the Maulers, a 33–21 with the winner assuming the rights to the first overall pick in the 2023 USFL draft.

In October, 2022, the Panthers hired Steve Kazor as general manager. After all eight USFL teams played their home games in Birmingham, Alabama, the Panthers moved to the state of Michigan in 2023, announcing Ford Field as their home stadium. On February 3, 2023, the USFL announced that Fisher had been replaced as head coach by Mike Nolan, citing only "personal reasons."

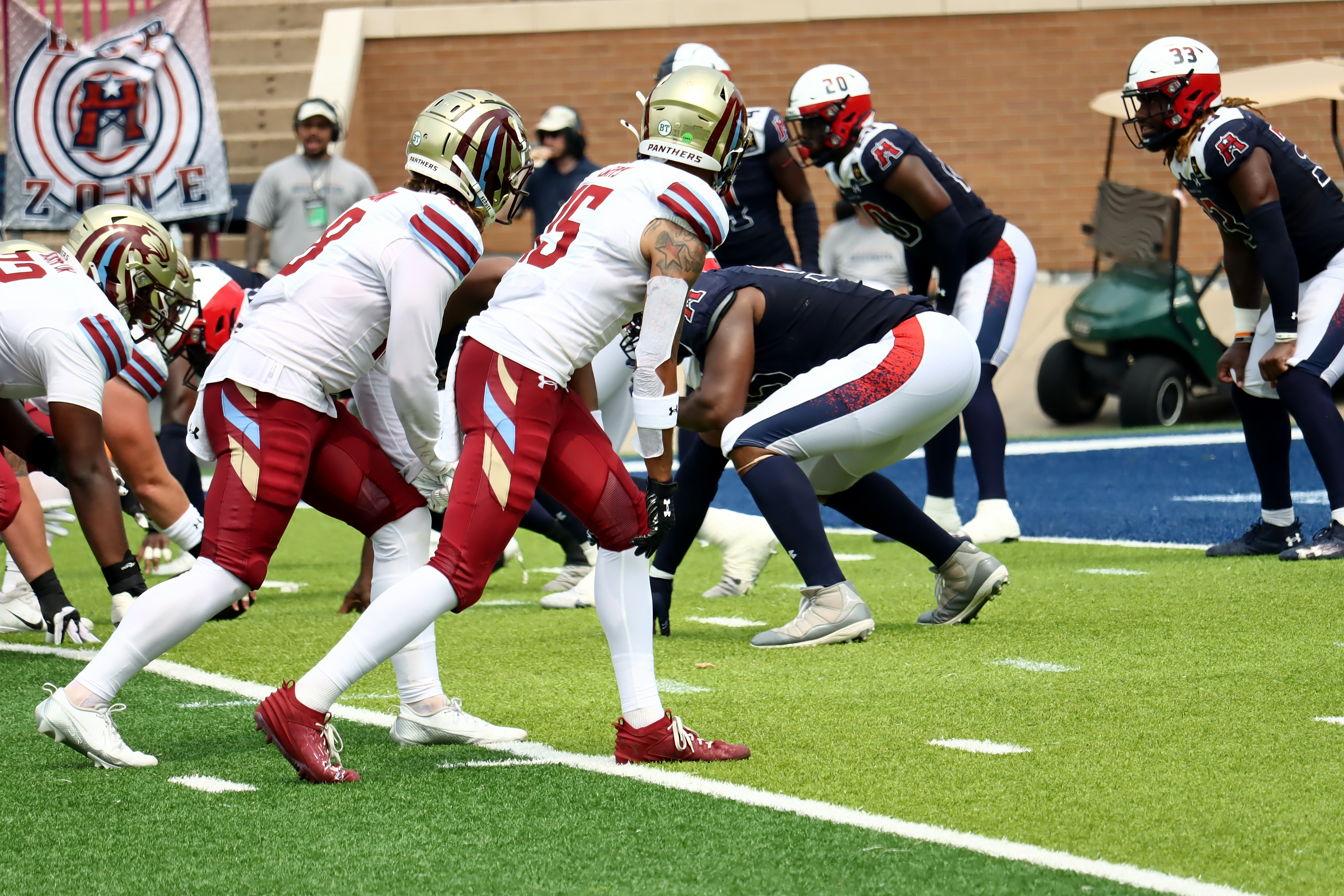
A game between the Panthers (left) and the Houston Roughnecks in Houston in 2024

In September 2023, Axios reported that the XFL was in advanced talks with the USFL to merge the two leagues prior to the start of their 2024 seasons. On September 28, 2023, the XFL and USFL announced their intent to merge with details surrounding the merger to be announced at a later date. The merger would also require regulatory approval. In October 2023 the XFL filed a trademark application for the name "United Football League". On November 30, 2023, Garcia announced via her Instagram page that the leagues had received regulatory approval for the merger and were finalizing plans for a "combined season" to begin March 30, 2024. The merger was made official on December 31, 2023.

With Ford Field charging a reported $500,000 per game, the Panthers paid the highest stadium rent of any team in the UFL. This high fee and other conflicts led to worsening relations between the UFL and the stadium, including a delay in the renewal of the Panthers' lease for 2025 and the preemptive decision not to host a playoff game at the stadium even if the Panthers had clinched home field advantage. Rynearson Stadium, a college football stadium that last hosted professional football games in 1974 with the ill-fated Detroit Wheels and had hosted the Panthers' practices in 2023, was reportedly considered as an alternative but ruled out mainly because of league officials' dislike of the stadium's nontraditional gray turf. These issues overwhelmed the strong gains that the Panthers had made both on and off the field in 2025 (the team was the only UFL team to see an increase in ticket sales that year) led to Michigan being included with the rest of the USFL Conference on a list of teams being considered for relocation following the 2025 season, a list that the UFL has not officially confirmed nor denied, calling it "unauthorized speculation." Incoming co-owner Mike Repole addressed the situation on August 26, confirming that the stadium situation was untenable, but that he had found a potential venue for the team: AlumniFi Field, a soccer-specific stadium that does not yet exist and will not until 2027. Executives at Eastern Michigan University stated they had never been contacted about the use of Rynearson and would have been willing to host the Panthers in 2026 until AlumniFi Field is completed.

On October 3, 2025, the UFL officially announced that the team would be discontinued. However, Repole cited Michigan as a return candidate for 2028 when AlumniFi Field opens. Players under contract were transferred to the Columbus Aviators; Mike Nolan was formally fired November 15. In July 2026, Repole reaffirmed his intent to bring back the Panthers once AlumniFi Field is complete, which is, as of that date, scheduled for early 2028; such a launch date would lead to the Panthers relaunching along with the Oklahoma City franchise. However, on September 23, 2026, the UFL ruled out a return for the Panthers in 2028, as the last expansion slot for that season was awarded to a Salt Lake City franchise.

As was the case with another UFL market (San Antonio), the Continental Football League announced a replacement franchise for the Panthers, a revival of the 1960s-era Michigan Arrows, which was to begin play in 2026. Panthers general manager Steve Kazor was to serve as the Arrows' head coach. The Arrows never launched, due to ownership disputes.

== Player history ==
=== Current NFL players ===
Season	Pos	Name	NFL team
2024	K	Jake Bates	Detroit Lions

=== Notable players ===
Season	Pos	Name	Notes
2023	DT	Robert Nkemdiche	Former Arizona Cardinals Defensive Tackle, 2016 1st Round Pick
2023–2025	DE	Breeland Speaks	Former Kansas City Chiefs Defensive End, 2018 2nd Round Pick

=== Offensive Player of the Year award winners ===
Panthers USFL OPOY winners
Year	Player	Position	Selector
2025	Bryce Perkins	QB	UFL

=== Defensive Player of the Year award winners ===
Panthers USFL DPOY winners
Year	Player	Position	Selector
2023	Frank Ginda	LB	USFL
2024	Breeland Speaks	DE	UFL

=== Special Teams Player of the Year award winners ===
Panthers USFL STPOY winners
Year	Player	Position	Selector
2025	Kedrick Whitehead Jr.	S	UFL

== Coach history ==
=== Head coach history ===
#	Name	Term	Regular season				Playoffs			Awards
#	Name	Term	GC	W	L	Win %	GC	W	L	Awards
Michigan Panthers
1	Jeff Fisher	2022	10	2	8	.200	0	0	0	
2	Mike Nolan	2023–2025	30	17	13	.586	3	1	2	UFL Coach of the Year (2024)

=== Offensive coordinator history ===
#	Name	Term	Regular season				Playoffs			Awards
#	Name	Term	GC	W	L	Win %	GC	W	L	Awards
Michigan Panthers
1	Eric Marty	2022–2023	20	6	14	.300	1	0	1	
2	Marcel Bellefeuille	2024–2025	20	13	7	.650	2	1	1	

=== Defensive coordinator history ===
#	Name	Term	Regular season				Playoffs			Awards
#	Name	Term	GC	W	L	Win %	GC	W	L	Awards
Michigan Panthers
1	Daniel Carrell	2022	10	2	8	.200	0	0	0	
2	Steve Brown	2023	10	4	6	.400	1	0	1	
2	Collin Bauer	2024–2025	20	13	7	.650	2	1	1	

== Records ==
All-time Panthers leaders
Leader	Player	Record	Years with Panthers
Passing yards	Josh Love	1,907 passing yards	2022–2023
Passing Touchdowns	Josh Love	15 passing touchdowns	2022–2023
Rushing	Reggie Corbin	955 rushing yards	2022–2023
Rushing Touchdowns	Bryce Perkins	7 rushing touchdowns	2024–2025
Receiving yards	Siaosi Mariner	873 receiving yards	2024–2025
Receiving Touchdowns	Cole Hikutini	7 receiving touchdowns	2023–2025
Receptions	Joe Walker	66 receptions	2022–2023
Tackles	Frank Ginda	348 tackles	2022–2025
Sacks	Breeland Speaks	18.5 sacks	2023–2025
Interceptions	Kai Nacua	4 interceptions	2023–2025
Coaching wins	Mike Nolan	17 wins	2023–2025

=== Starting quarterbacks ===
Regular season – As of June 9, 2025

Season(s)	Quarterback(s)	Notes	Ref
2022	Shea Patterson (0–5) / Paxton Lynch (2–1) / Josh Love (0–2)		
2023	Josh Love (3–6) / E.J. Perry (1–0)		
2024	Danny Etling (3–1) / E.J. Perry (2–2) / Brian Lewerke (2–0)		
2025	Bryce Perkins (4–2) / Danny Etling (2–1) / Rocky Lombardi (0–1)		

Postseason

Season(s)	Quarterback(s)	Notes	Ref
2023	E.J. Perry (0–1)		
2024	Danny Etling (0–1)		
2025	Bryce Perkins (1–1)		

Most games as starting quarterback

Name	Period	GP	GS	W	L	Pct
Josh Love	2022–2023	14	11	3	8	.273
Danny Etling	2024–2025	15	7	5	2	.714
Bryce Perkins	2024–2025	12	6	4	2	.667
E.J. Perry	2023–2024	5	5	3	2	.600
Shea Patterson	2022	6	5	0	5	.000
Paxton Lynch	2022	6	3	2	1	.667
Brian Lewerke	2024	5	2	2	0	1.000
Rocky Lombardi	2025	2	1	0	1	.000

== Statistics and records ==
=== Season by season record ===
UFL champions^{†} (2024–present)	USFL champions^{§} (2022–2023)	Conference champions^{*}	Division champions^{^}	Wild Card berth^{#}

Season	Team	League	Conference	Division	Regular season			Postseason results	Awards	Head coaches	Pct.
Season	Team	League	Conference	Division	Finish	W	L	Postseason results	Awards	Head coaches	Pct.
2022	2022	USFL	—N/a	North	3rd	2	8			Jeff Fisher	.200
2023	2023	USFL	—N/a	North	2nd ^{#}	4	6	Lost Division Finals (at Maulers) 27–31 (OT)	Frank Ginda (DPOY); Ethan Westbrooks (SMOY)	Mike Nolan	.567
2024	2024	UFL	USFL	—N/a	2nd ^{#}	7	3	Lost USFL Conference Championship (at Stallions) 18–31	Mike Nolan (COTY); Breeland Speaks (DPOTY)	Mike Nolan	.567
2025	2025	UFL	USFL ^{*}	—N/a	2nd ^{#}	6	4	Won USFL Conference Championship (at Stallions) 44–29; Lost UFL Championship (vs. Defenders) 34–58	Bryce Perkins (MVP)	Mike Nolan	.567
Total						19	21	All-time regular season record (2022–2025)			.475
Total						1	3	All-time postseason record (2022–2025)			.250
Total						20	24	All-time regular season and postseason record (2022–2025)			.455

=== Rivalries ===
==== Northern Duel ====
The Michigan Panthers previously shared a rivalry with the New Jersey Generals. This rivalry was called the Northern Duel. The Panthers finished with a 1–3 record against the New Jersey Generals in 2 seasons. After the 2023 season the rivalry was not renewed as the New Jersey Generals folded during the XFL–USFL merger of 2024.

==== Franchise matchup history ====
Team	Record	Pct.
Dallas Renegades	2–0	1.000
DC Defenders	2–1	.667
Memphis Showboats	4–1	.800
Houston Gamblers/Roughnecks	4–2	.667
St. Louis Battlehawks	1–1	.500
San Antonio Brahmas	1–1	.500
Philadelphia Stars	2–2	.500
Pittsburgh Maulers	2–3	.400
New Jersey Generals	1–3	.250
Tampa Bay Bandits	0–1	.000
New Orleans Breakers	0–2	.000
Birmingham Stallions	1–7	.125

- Defunct teams in light gray.
