= MacArthur Park Raceway =

Coordinates: 35°27′04″N 97°37′23″W

MacArthur Park Raceway was a nationally recognized ½-mile paved asphalt two and four-cycle kart racing sprint track with nine turns in Oklahoma City, Oklahoma.

It was built in the 1970s as an amusement park and kart racing facility. Since the 1970s, kart racing and superbike racers have used the track for practice and sanctioned national, regional and state-level racing events; the amusement park facility has since closed. The track contains three 'mini-track' configurations that allow flexibility for numerous types of kart racing, including oval track and Sprint racing.

The MacArthur Park Raceway was the official venue of the 2005 Karting Regionals. In 2006 and 2007, the MacArthur Park Raceway was host to the Oklahoma SuperBikers races. Although the track is known for having a rough surface, it is appreciated for its ability to let most any rubber compound grip its asphalt surface. The track operates by announcement and practice is generally conducted 'rain or shine'. In 2007, the Oklahoma ice storms in December forced a 'no-takers' day when not one person ran a kart or cycle on the track as a result of freezing rain, which actually sealed vehicle doors shut with thick clear ice. Weather is almost never a nixer at MacArthur Park Raceway.

As of December 2012 the raceway is closed; no current information is available on the web.
