= Oklahoma UFL team =

Professional American football team

General information
- Founded: April 9, 2026; 6 months ago
- Stadium: Oklahoma City Stadium; Oklahoma City, Oklahoma
- Website: www.theufl.com/oklahoma

Personnel
- Owner: League owned

Team history
- Oklahoma UFL team (2028–present)

League / conference affiliations
- United Football League (2028)

The Oklahoma UFL team is a professional American football team based in Oklahoma City, Oklahoma. The team will compete in the United Football League (UFL). They are planned to begin play in 2028. The team, along with the rest of the league, is owned and operated by a consortium led by Mike Repole, and will play their home games at the MAPS 4 multipurpose stadium.

== History ==
The Oklahoma UFL team was announced on April 9, 2026.

It is one of two planned expansion teams expected to begin play in 2028, along with the Utah UFL team; in the league announcement, the team, which had previously been referred to as "Oklahoma City" is now called "Oklahoma".
