= United Football League (2024–present) =

American football league

- Upcoming season or competition: 2027 UFL season
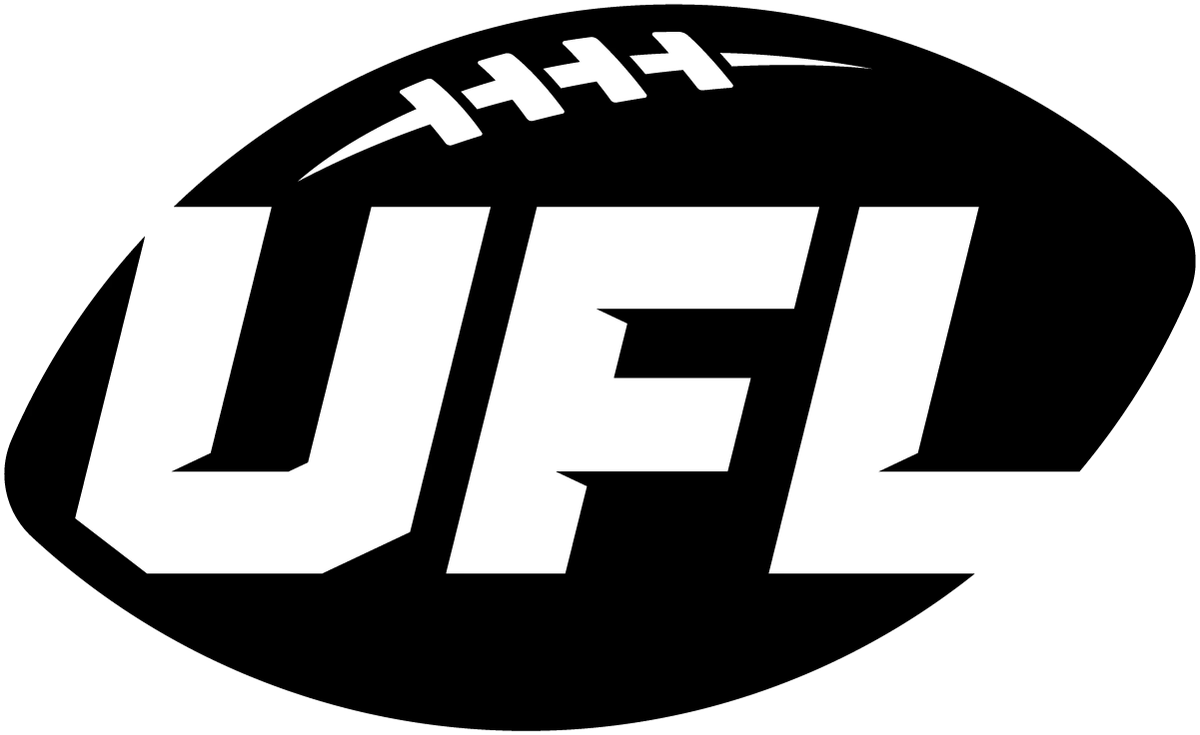
- Classification: Spring football league
- Sport: American football
- Founded: December 31, 2023
- First season: 2024
- Owners: National Spring Football League Enterprises Co, LLC (Fox Corporation): XFL Properties LLC; (RedBird Capital Partners); (Dwayne Johnson); (Dany Garcia); (The Walt Disney Company); Impact Capital; (Mike Repole)
- CEO: Russ Brandon
- President: Russ Brandon
- No. of teams: 8 (10 in 2028)
- Country: United States
- Headquarters: 1 North Broadway; White Plains, New York; U.S.
- Most recent champions: Louisville Kings (1st title)
- Most titles: Louisville Kings; Birmingham Stallions; DC Defenders (1 title)
- Broadcasters: United States: ABC/ESPN/ESPN2/NFL Network Fox/FS1; International: ESPN (Note: Spanish audio/broadcast)
- Streaming partners: United States: ESPN app Fox One; International: Disney+ (Note: Spanish audio/broadcast) DAZN
- Related competitions: Direct: USFL, XFL, TSL; Affiliated: IFL; Other: NFL, CFL, AAF, FXFL
- Website: theufl.com

The United Football League (UFL) is a professional American football spring league in the United States. The league was created following the merger of the XFL and United States Football League (USFL); it started play in March 2024. It comprises eight teams in a mix of major sports media markets and mid-sized cities not served by major pro sports (such as those that currently or recently have hosted Class AAA minor league baseball); three of the teams are former XFL franchises, while the other five are expansion teams established beginning in the 2026 and 2027 seasons (the remaining USFL teams were eliminated following that season) under the ownership of Mike Repole.

== Background ==
=== 2020–2021 ===
In 2017, Vince McMahon, who had previously launched the XFL in 2001 as a partnership with NBC Sports, registered a trademark for the United Football League name. An unrelated United Football League, founded by Bill Hambrecht, had played four abbreviated seasons from 2009 to 2012. McMahon ultimately did not use the UFL trademark, as response to the ESPN Films 30 for 30 documentary "This Was the XFL" in 2017 showed that the XFL brand was still viable, and in February 2020, McMahon relaunched the XFL with a similar business structure (though, unlike the 2001 XFL, operated as a sole proprietorship of McMahon's separate from his professional wrestling corporation, WWE) and an emphasis on speed and innovation. The XFL, which was largely successful with its attendance and television ratings, was forced to shut down halfway through its 2020 season in March due to stay-at-home orders imposed during the COVID-19 pandemic and declared bankruptcy in April. Later that year, McMahon sold the league to a consortium led by businesswoman Dany Garcia, Garcia's ex-husband and former WWE wrestler Dwayne Johnson (also known as "The Rock"), and private equity firm RedBird Capital Partners. The XFL chose not to play a 2021 season (most gathering restrictions would not be lifted until spring of that year) and cancelled the 2022 season after partnership discussions with the Canadian Football League collapsed without any agreement in fall 2021.

While the XFL was on hiatus, Fox Sports, which had been one of the XFL's broadcast partners along with ESPN in 2020, entered a partnership with Brian Woods, who had been operating The Spring League (TSL) as a non-paying, pay-to-play developmental showcase for professional players under a single-campus bubble format since 2017. The XFL had funded The Spring League's 2019 season to test rule changes and were holding discussions about a potential affiliation between the two leagues before the bankruptcy. Fox aired the autumn 2020 and spring 2021 seasons of The Spring League.

=== 2022–2023 ===
Following the 2021 season, Woods and Fox announced they had acquired the trademarks of the original 1980s incarnation of the United States Football League and would be launching a reboot of the USFL in spring 2022. The 2022 USFL season, though its eight teams nominally bore the names of eight former USFL franchises including their cities, continued to use the bubble format with all eight teams based in Birmingham, Alabama, in the 2022 season. The playoffs were held in Canton, Ohio. Woods eventually backed out of the USFL after the 2022 season.

The XFL and USFL played separate, partially overlapping seasons in 2023, to roughly similar television viewership numbers. The USFL expanded to four home cities, adding Memphis, Tennessee and Detroit, Michigan, to Birmingham and Canton, with each city hosting two teams, while the XFL moved three of its eight teams to new cities and held all eight teams' practices at a hub in Arlington, Texas.

For the 2023 season, the USFL average viewership in 2023 was down 16% from its debut season to 601,000 and 3% lower than the 2023 XFL season, despite having 28 over-the-air network games compared to eight for the XFL. The championship game also saw a significant decline in viewership from 2022 as the game averaged 1.2 million viewers across NBC, Peacock, and NBC Sports digital platforms. USFL President Daryl Johnston expressed disappointment and anger that the USFL was comparable to the XFL in ratings for the 2023 season, dismissing the XFL as "no competition" to the "far superior" USFL and musing "to be on par with our competition from a ratings standpoint in Year 2, I'm still trying to figure out: How did that happen? (...) they're not even close." The USFL was already seeking additional investors prior to the start of the 2023 season and had hired Allen & Company to assist in the search; Fox lost an unspecified amount of money on the venture in 2023 due to the high startup expenses for a professional football league.

At the same time, the XFL lost nearly $60 million during the season after spending approximately $140 million in expenses over the course of the 2023 season and earning $80 million in gross revenue, including roughly $20 million that came from its broadcast contract with ESPN. Executives with the league and ESPN indicated that they considered the season a success. Like the USFL, the XFL was also seeking additional investors with the assistance of PJT Partners. After the season ended, the XFL made league-wide cuts affecting up to 30 people, including two marketing executives, and shifted other employees to seasonal work.

Both the USFL and XFL believed that the leagues could be independently viable in the long term even if they continued to compete against each other but, by the time of the 2023 USFL championship, they had decided that setting aside the business rivalry and merging the two leagues would be even more financially advantageous.

== History ==
=== XFL–USFL merger ===
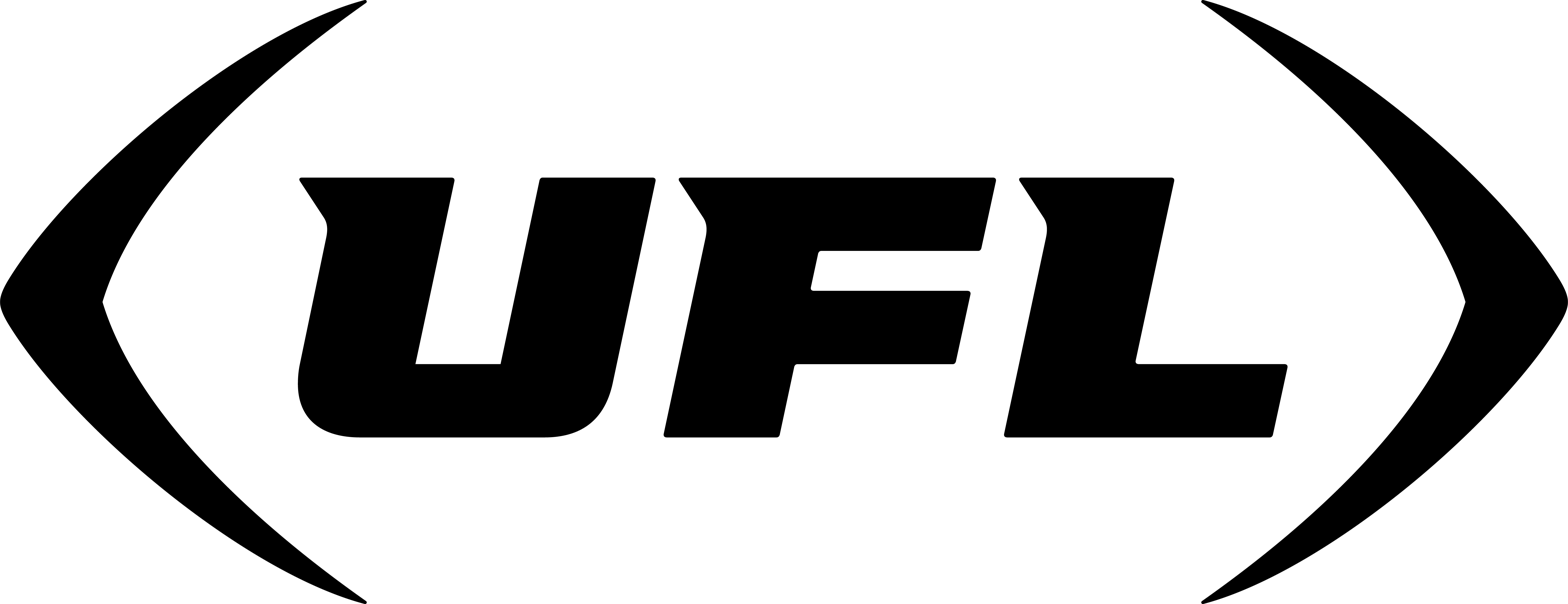
The first UFL logo, used in the 2024 and 2025 seasons.

In September 2023, Axios reported that the XFL was in advanced talks with the USFL to merge the leagues prior to the start of their 2024 seasons. On September 28, 2023, the XFL and USFL announced their intent to merge with details surrounding the merger to be announced at a later date. The merger would also require regulatory approval. In October 2023 the XFL filed a trademark application for the name "United Football League". On November 30, 2023, Garcia announced via her Instagram page that the leagues had received regulatory approval for the merger and were finalizing plans for a combined season to begin March 30, 2024.

The merger was formally announced on Fox NFL Sunday on December 31, 2023. The eight surviving teams were announced the following day on College GameDay, along with the alignment; the XFL and USFL will survive as separate conferences. Daryl Johnston would note in February that maintaining the XFL and USFL conferences as separate entities was designed to build an on-field rivalry between the two brands and to give the winner of the league's championship "bragging rights". President/CEO Russ Brandon would later say that the league would be looking at expansion shortly, while Defenders defensive coordinator Gregg Williams revealed plans to expand to 12 teams by 2025 and to 16 teams by 2026. In a May 2024 interview, Johnston stated that he did not anticipate any relocations for 2025.

=== 2024 season ===
The 2024 UFL season began on March 30, 2024, with a matchup between the 2023 XFL champion Arlington Renegades and the 2023 USFL champion Birmingham Stallions. It concluded with the 2024 UFL Championship Game between the Stallions and the San Antonio Brahmas on June 16 in St. Louis.

The UFL exceeded internal expectations for the 2024 season, with Fox Sports executive Eric Shanks commenting that, though the league still lost money, it was "ahead of the expected pace" in terms of achieving self-sustenance. Television viewership rose substantially compared to the previous season as separate leagues, while ticket sales in most cities declined, prompting the league ownership to shift investment toward local ticket sales teams.

=== 2025 season ===
The 2025 UFL season began on March 28, 2025 and concluded with the 2025 UFL Championship Game on June 14 in St. Louis, where the DC Defenders defeated the Michigan Panthers. In November 2024, the UFL announced it was officially initiating a team expansion process, and was welcoming proposals from potential markets interested in professional spring football.

In an interview with Randy Karraker prior to the 2025 UFL Championship Game, Brandon indicated that the league had reached the point of being a going concern and that players, agents and coaches now had enough confidence in the league that it was not at risk of failure in the short term, effectively guaranteeing a 2026 UFL season. Overall television ratings and attendance went down in most markets (with the exception of the Michigan Panthers, who made substantial gains), which prompted the firings of ticket sales directors and vice presidents of business operations in Arlington, Houston and Birmingham, three of the UFL's most consistently underperforming markets. The decline in television ratings was not enough to cause alarm for league executives, who remained satisfied with the results, but did prompt reconsideration of the league's start date, which followed the USFL model of starting several weeks after the end of the NFL season (whereas the XFL traditionally drafted off the end of the NFL season and began play the weekend after the Super Bowl). Reports circulated that the UFL would also shift the date of the 2025 UFL draft, moving it from July to September to capitalize on roster cuts made by NFL teams after their preseasons conclude, allowing UFL teams to use their draft picks more effectively on players more likely to sign immediately.

=== 2026 season ===
Responding to a July 23, 2025 report that the entire USFL Conference would be relocated to other cities by early August in time for the 2026 season, the UFL neither confirmed nor denied the "unauthorized speculation". One of the alleged host venues that the report claimed would be hosting a team—Albertsons Stadium in Boise, Idaho—released a statement denying the stadium would host the UFL in 2026 but that it was a possibility for the future. Sources in Lexington, Kentucky, another one of the cities mentioned in the report, also denied that they had heard from anyone in the league about the supposed relocations.

On July 31, 2025, the league announced the addition of another private equity firm, Impact Capital, to the league's ownership group, with its owner Mike Repole serving as the league's new director of business operations; Repole stated that he had purchased a large minority stake in the league. As part of the same announcement, Repole confirmed that one of the league's eight teams would be relocating to Historic Crew Stadium in Columbus, Ohio and that the league would remain at eight teams for 2026, with two to four teams relocating which had not yet been decided. Birmingham was the first of the four reported teams to be addressed when Repole responded to fans' Save the Stallions campaign by stating it would be given one final chance to increase its ticket sales, aiming for 5,000 season ticket deposits and 15,000 tickets per game. Positive response to the Stallions deposit drive prompted Repole to confirm the team's return for 2026, admitting the move was a test of how the Stallions fan base would respond. In Michigan's case, Repole stated that he was "trying" to keep the team in the state but that his stadium options were undesirable.

On October 3, 2025, the UFL announced that the Michigan Panthers, Memphis Showboats and San Antonio Brahmas would not return for the 2026 season. Repole cited Michigan in particular as a return candidate for 2028 when AlumniFi Field opens. San Antonio's shuttering, which was personally ordered by Repole, was a complete surprise, as the UFL had already renewed the stadium lease for the Alamodome when the team's shuttering was announced.

On October 7, 2025, the UFL announced its new teams for the 2026 season; the Columbus Aviators (playing at Historic Crew Stadium in Columbus, Ohio), the Louisville Kings (playing at Lynn Family Stadium in Louisville, Kentucky) and the Orlando Storm (playing at Inter.co Stadium in Orlando, Florida). Players and staff under contract to the Michigan Panthers, Memphis Showboats and San Antonio Brahmas were transferred to the Columbus Aviators, Louisville Kings and Orlando Storm, respectively. However, the new teams are considered separate and will not inherit the history or records of the folded ones.

In addition, the UFL also announced the relocation and rebrand of two of their legacy teams; the former Houston Roughnecks would revert to their Houston Gamblers name and play at Shell Energy Stadium, and the former Arlington Renegades would revert to their Dallas Renegades name and play at Toyota Stadium.

Among other changes were the formal dissolutions of the XFL and USFL conferences, the demotion of Brandon to a vice president role (later reversed), the elimination of Johnston's position, the elimination of all eight general manager positions (with three—the Renegades' Rick Mueller, Houston's Will Lewis and Memphis's Jim Monos—being retained in the league's new centralized personnel department), and the planned institution of territorial rights to college players, something the XFL had explicitly rejected.

The 2026 season began March 27, 2026 and concluded on June 13, 2026 with the 2026 United Bowl in Washington, DC, where the newly established Louisville Kings defeated the defending champion and host DC Defenders.

=== 2027 season ===
Following the 2026 season, Repole described his feelings about the season as "happy, but not content." He stated his dissatisfaction with the situation in Birmingham and that staying in Protective Stadium for 2027 "goes against (...) the biggest principles we’re building this league around."

On July 30, 2026, Repole announced the dissolution of both remaining USFL legacy teams, the Birmingham Stallions and Houston Gamblers. In Houston's case, Repole acknowledged instability (annual stadium changes and the substitution of the successful XFL Roughnecks with the Gamblers) that damaged relations between Houston and the league beyond repair as the key reason for the team's failure; though the team's announcement had not been foreseen, it was met with little surprise, given the team consistently having attendance among the UFL's worst. In Birmingham, a continued stalemate between the city and Repole over the suitability of Protective Stadium, along with Hoover Metropolitan Stadium's rejection of the league, were the primary factors in Repole's decision, which he had publicly warned of a week prior. Repole had stated that the Stallions would have stayed if not for the stadium situation and that the fan base had otherwise turned out enough to keep the franchise if a smaller stadium in the city were available. The mayor of Montgomery, where the more appropriately-sized Cramton Bowl and ASU Stadium exist, had offered to host the Stallions there to keep the team in Alabama, but Repole turned it down.

In related news, Repole also stated that the response from potential expansion markets had been stronger than expected, which led him to move the league's expansion timetable up so that in addition to the two replacements for Birmingham and Houston, and the additions of Oklahoma City and the undecided tenth team in 2028, the 11th and 12th franchises could be added as soon as the 2029 season instead of 2030. In early September, Repole stated that the two cities replacing Birmingham and Houston would be unveiled by no later than October 1 and that he "guarantee(d)" an earlier start to the 2027 UFL season compared to the previous three years. Such guarantee went unfulfilled when, on September 17, the league announced that it would again start on the last Friday of March for 2027, a decision made at the behest of the league's television partners and venues (with the prominent objection of St. Louis, which had other events scheduled for much of the late spring season).

On September 23, 2026, the UFL announced that it would be adding new teams in Colorado Springs, Colorado and Pawtucket, Rhode Island for the 2027 season, followed by adding a new team in Sandy, Utah as well as the previously-announced Oklahoma City team for 2028. Birmingham Stallions under contract were transferred to the Rhode Island Breakers. However, the Breakers are considered a separate team and will not inherit the history or records of the Stallions. On September 30, 2026, the entirety of the Renegades roster were reassigned to the Colorado Stampede while the roster for the former Gamblers were summarily assigned to the Renegades.

== Teams ==
For the 2027 season, eight teams will compete in the United Football League under a single-entity model. Up to 64 players can be recruited by teams for training camps, and 43 for the regular season. Players in the league are unionized under the United Football Players Association (UFPA), and its most recent collective bargaining agreement expired at the end of the 2026 season. It guaranteed a minimum salary of $64,000 for players, bonuses, and year-round access to healthcare.

Of the charter members in the inaugural 2024 season, three continue to play in the league: the St. Louis Battlehawks, DC Defenders, and Dallas Renegades, all of which came from the XFL. The rest of the league's membership are expansion teams that commenced play in the UFL: the Colorado Stampede, Columbus Aviators, Louisville Kings, Orlando Storm and Rhode Island Breakers. One team in the XFL did not survive and none of the teams from the United States Football League (USFL) have survived. In 2028, the league plans to expand to ten teams, with the first expansion team to be based in Oklahoma City and the second expansion team to be based in Utah.

United Football League teams
| Team | Location | Stadium | Capacity | First season | Head coach |
|---|---|---|---|---|---|
| Colorado Stampede | Colorado Springs, Colorado | Weidner Field | 8,000 | 2027 | Rick Neuheisel |
| Columbus Aviators | Columbus, Ohio | Historic Crew Stadium | 19,968 | 2026 | Ted Ginn Jr. |
| Dallas Renegades | Frisco, Texas | Toyota Stadium | 11,000 (Note: Operating at a reduced capacity for 2026 due to ongoing renovations.) | 2020 | Kevin Sumlin |
| DC Defenders | Washington, D.C. | Audi Field | 20,000 | 2020 | Shannon Harris |
| Louisville Kings | Louisville, Kentucky | Lynn Family Stadium | 11,700 | 2026 | Chris Redman |
| Orlando Storm | Orlando, Florida | Inter.co Stadium | 25,500 | 2026 | Anthony Becht |
| Rhode Island Breakers | Pawtucket, Rhode Island | Centreville Bank Stadium | 10,500 | 2027 | A. J. McCarron |
| St. Louis Battlehawks | St. Louis, Missouri | The Dome at America's Center | 39,000 (Note: Most upper deck seating closed off for UFL games, limiting seating to under 39,000 depending on demand.) | 2020 | Ricky Proehl |

Future teams
| Team | Location | Stadium | Capacity | First season |
|---|---|---|---|---|
| Oklahoma | Oklahoma City, Oklahoma | Oklahoma City Stadium | 10,000 | 2028 |
| Utah | Sandy, Utah | America First Field | 20,213 | 2028 |

=== Former teams ===
List of former teams
| Team | Location | Stadium | First season | Final season | Fate |
|---|---|---|---|---|---|
| Birmingham Stallions | Birmingham, Alabama | Protective Stadium | 2022 | 2026 | Folded |
| Houston Gamblers | Houston, Texas | Shell Energy Stadium | 2022 (Note: For 2024 and 2025, the Gamblers operated under the identity of the Houston Roughnecks but shared no other commonalities with that team.) | 2026 | Folded |
| Michigan Panthers | Detroit, Michigan | Ford Field | 2022 | 2025 | Folded |
| Memphis Showboats | Memphis, Tennessee | Simmons Bank Liberty Stadium | 2023 | 2025 | Folded |
| San Antonio Brahmas | San Antonio, Texas | Alamodome | 2023 | 2025 | Folded |

== Players ==
Each team carries 75-men roster to training camp, then in the regular season rosters will cut down to 50 (45 active on game day). The minimum stay on injured reserve is five games, while season ending injured reserve designation guarantees player a camp invite the following season.

While the UFL embraced more of a "developmental league" mentality, they are also targeting veteran backup players, with Johnston saying: "there are a lot of guys who are at peace that their NFL window has closed, but they love the camaraderie of the locker room. They love the day-to-day grind... That's been the really inspiring thing to me, there is a number of guys in our league who just love the game and want to keep playing it as long as they can. Players that have three or four years in the NFL and want to kind of rewrite that narrative, the way that they're being viewed by front offices in the NFL, they want an opportunity to come into the UFL and change that narrative". Johnston also mentioned that the league would like to change the narrative, from "developmental league" and starting to talk about the "sustainability of spring football": "I think one of the things that we've started to have conversations is what do we want our new messaging to be? We do want to move off of the developmental component. We want to get away from the opportunity component. We want to talk about the talent of the players that are in this league... (compare to) spring football that you have seen in other iterations, this will be the best talent that if you're a fan of spring football, you will have seen in recent history". Repole explicitly framed his vision for the UFL as a developmental league where players stay a year, then either advance to the NFL or are pushed out of professional football, stating he did not want veteran players staying loyal to the league for multi-year careers.

The league holds a draft to allocate rights to incoming players. The draft held after the 2024 season was held shortly after 2024 NFL draft and was limited to rookies who went undrafted in that draft; after most of the drafted players (including first overall selection Jason Bean, who eventually did join the UFL in 2026) opted to remain in the NFL, the league moved the 2025 UFL draft to September to better assess what players would be cut from NFL rosters and thus be available to the UFL for 2026.

Beginning in the 2025–26 offseason, UFL players who have accrued two years under contract to the same team will be allowed to test free agency.

=== Unionization and compensation ===
The United Football Players Association, as of 2025, serves as the labor union for the UFL. It is the first league in which the UFPA has served as a formal union for its players. The Local 9004 of the United Steelworkers, which had served as the labor union for the USFL in 2023, continued in that capacity for the UFL for the 2024 season, operating as the United Football League Players Association. (This is not to be confused with the United Football Players Association, which Local 9004 disowned during the 2023–24 offseason.) The league continued operating under the USFL's collective bargaining agreement (CBA).

Initial reports suggested that, contrary to the 2023 XFL season, quarterbacks would not be allowed to sign for salaries higher than the other positional players. However, the UFLPA later clarified that the agreement with the league is for minimum salary only, and any player could sign a personal contract above the minimum. As late as January 2024, the league had resisted "pushback" from some of the higher-paid XFL quarterbacks to increase quarterbacks' salary, with Johnston at the time refusing to deviate from the plan to pay all players equally while acknowledging "there's a good argument for both sides. How do we manage this situation(...)? It's hard to thread that needle."

Select XFL players, who had voted against joining the USW in 2023, expressed concern about the lack of winning bonuses (a key feature of the XFL's pay structure) and a requirement to pay union dues, while some players decided not to return to the league, citing the pay cut as a contributing factor. In an interview after the merger, Battlehawks QB AJ McCarron revealed that XFL players were in advanced talks with the National Football League Players Association (NFLPA) for exclusive representation.

On August 12, 2024, the UFLPA announced that United Steelworkers had ceased representing UFL players. In a statement, the UFLPA recommended its members affiliate the UFLPA with an established union, strongly hinting not to affiliate with the United Football Players Association. The UFPA stated that it had won an election to serve as the UFL's union on October 12. The UFPA took a much more aggressive negotiating stance against the league than Local 9004 had; it dismissed the previous CBA as being "unacceptable and disgusting", orchestrated a short strike against a quarterback minicamp, and filed an accusation of unfair labor practices with the NLRB in response to the thus-far unsuccessful negotiations for a new agreement. On April 18, 2025, the UFPA announced it had ratified a new collective bargaining agreement. The agreement will expire following the end of the 2026 season.

==== Salary ====
UFL players' minimum salaries were $5,500 per week ($2,500 for inactive players) and $150 a week toward 401K contributions, with $400 a week house stipend and $55-a-day per diem stipend during travel days. All contracts will run from January 1 to August 24. During training camp, all players will receive $850 a week. Players on injured reserve will receive $2,500 a week (plus house stipend). UFL players will also be entitled for "players accolade bonuses" for Player of the week ($1,000), All UFL ($2,500), Player of the year ($5,000), and MVP ($7,500). The overall league player budget was $24 million.

The UFPA agreement raises pay to $6,200 per game, then $6,400 per game in 2026. Health insurance coverage will expand from the previous four months to seven months, and the remaining five months being covered by giving the players access under COBRA.

== Rules ==
Mike Pereira and Dean Blandino are in charge of the UFL's officiating and rules.

The league rulebook was released on February 13, 2024. Though most of the UFL's unique rules were common to both the USFL and XFL (such as allowing a second forward pass if the first does not cross the line of scrimmage, and the treatment of a fumble through the end zone the same as other forward fumbles in that it is brought back to the spot of the fumble), a limited number required compromise or were changed entirely from both leagues' rules:

- For the 2024 season, the UFL used the USFL's kickoff rule, which resembles that used at most levels of the game but kicks off from the kicking team's 20-yard line instead of the 35-yard line used at the college and NFL levels at the time (as opposed to the XFL rule—also adopted by the NFL in 2024—which kicked off from the 30-yard line but had the opposing teams line up 35 and 40 yards downfield from the kick respectively and required the kicker to land the kick within 20 yards of the end zone without going in). A rule proposal would have replaced the kickoff with a punt, thereby resembling the safety kick at other levels of the game, but this rule did not make it into the rule book. In 2025, the league—with great reluctance on Johnston's part, as Johnston was a staunch proponent of traditional kickoffs—switched to the NFL/XFL kickoff formation, after the UFL determined that the NFL was going to make the newer formation a permanent rule and wanted to maintain compatibility with NFL rules.
- The onside conversion option remains available, with a team trailing in the fourth quarter allowed to attempt a single scrimmage play to gain 12 yards from its own 28-yard line. (The XFL used 15 yards from its own 25-yard line; the USFL used 12 yards from its own 33-yard line.)
- Pass interference penalties are limited to 15 yards from the previous line of scrimmage or the spot of the foul, whichever is less.
- The league uses the XFL's variable-distance conversion rule, offering one, two or three points depending upon how far away from the goal line the offense chooses to attempt the play, and prohibiting kicking for the extra point. (The USFL had allowed the two and three point scrimmage conversions but allowed for an extra point kick.)
- All touchbacks come to the receiving team's 25-yard line. Any coffin corner punt that goes out of bounds beyond the 25-yard line will be treated as a touchback, a rule previously used in the XFL (though that league had used the 35-yard line for its touchbacks).
- The league uses the National Football League rule requiring a receiver to land both feet in bounds for a forward pass to be counted as complete. This was a change from both the XFL and USFL, along with most other professional leagues other than the NFL, that only required one foot in-bounds for a completed pass.
- The XFL overtime rule has been carried over, in that tie games involve a best-of-three shootout of two-point conversion attempts from each 5-yard line. If the tie persists, multiple attempts are played until one team scores, which wins it. One timeout can be called per attempt. The overtime has no game clock, but the play clock is still used.

On February 24, 2026, the UFL announced rule changes to "turbocharge offenses" and increase player safety. The rule changes included:

- Kicking a field goal of 60 yards or more would be worth four points instead of three.
- Teams will no longer be able to punt if they cross the 50-yard line into their opponent's territory, except after the two-minute warning in each half. This rule applies even if the offense commits a penalty that pushes them back behind the 50-yard line.
- The Tush Push, defined by the UFL as "a play in which, after the quarterback takes the snap, he immediately drives forward as the offensive line surges and is assisted by additional players behind him who physically push him forward into the surging offensive line", is prohibited.
- Aligning their rules regarding two-point conversions to be the same as the NFL's - the ball will be placed on the 2-yard line for a conversion attempt (previously, the ball was placed on the 5-yard line). Teams will still have the option to kick an extra point or attempt a three-point conversion from the 8-yard line.
- Adjusting the kickoff placement to increase kickoff returns. The kicking team was moved back 5 yards, from the receiving team's 40-yard line to its 45. And the receiving team's zone to line up was moved up 5 yards, from between the 30- and 35-yard lines to between the 35 and the 40.
- Adopting the NCAA's rule on receptions requiring the receiver only have one foot in bounds to complete a catch.

== Partnerships ==
In February 2022, the XFL signed a collaboration agreement with the NFL to "experiment with proposed rules, test new equipment and develop prospective officials and coaches and explore new ways to address player safety". In October 2022, the XFL announced a player personnel partnership with the Indoor Football League (IFL), with the IFL functioning as the XFL's de facto minor league. Though the league has no formal partnership with Arena Football One (AF1), it has actively recruited from that league.

In 2023, Dwayne Johnson said that "the XFL specifically designed its schedule to give its players the best chance of latching on with an NFL team in May", while Gerry Cardinale stated that "the minor league analogy is valid, that's an important part of this." After the merger, UFL Executive VP of Football Operations Daryl Johnston refuted the notion of a "minor-league" when he said in an interview: "I don't want to be considered a developmental league or a feeder league. We're a professional, stand-alone football league", but he also acknowledged the importance of an NFL partnership: "the number of people we have at the top of our league office that have connections to the NFL, I'm hoping we're able to accelerate that process and have meaningful conversations with the NFL about what our league can provide (...) What we're trying to do is maximize the talent and quality of play in our league. One way we can do that is having access to guys who are in the NFL, on that fringe, on that cusp". It was later announced that the XFL's previous agreement with the NFL would continue for the 2024 UFL season. Incoming co-owner Mike Repole described his goal for the UFL as to "complement(...) the NFL and rid(e) off their momentum(,)" "not looking to compete with the NFL." Repole also stated his explicit desire to make the UFL a developmental league and a desire not to cultivate long-term talent that stays in the league, hoping instead to send its players up to the NFL at the nearest opportunity; he plans on telling UFL players "I want this to be your last year in the United Football League.."

== Records ==
All-time UFL leaders
| Leader | Player | Team | Record | Year |
|---|---|---|---|---|
| Passing yards | Luis Perez | St. Louis Battlehawks | 5,631 passing yards | 2024–present |
| Passing touchdowns | Jordan Ta'amu | DC Defenders | 46 passing touchdowns | 2024–present |
| Rushing yards | Jacob Saylors | St. Louis Battlehawks | 959 rushing yards | 2024–2025 |
| Rushing touchdowns | Ricky Person Jr. Deon Jackson | Birmingham Stallions; DC Defenders | 11 rushing touchdowns | 2024–2025; 2025–present |
| Receiving yards | Hakeem Butler | St. Louis Battlehawks | 1,593 receiving yards | 2024–present |
| Receiving touchdowns | Tyler Vaughns | Dallas Renegades | 14 receiving touchdowns | 2024–present |
| Receptions | Justin Hall | Houston Gamblers | 148 receptions | 2024–present |
| Tackles | Kyahva Tezino | Birmingham Stallions | 187 tackles | 2024–present |
| Tackle for Loss | Derick Roberson | DC Defenders | 22 TFLs | 2024–present |
| Sacks | Pita Taumoepenu | St. Louis Battlehawks | 19 sacks | 2024–present |
| Interceptions | A. J. Thomas | St. Louis Battlehawks | 6 interceptions | 2024–present |
| Coaching wins | Anthony Becht | St. Louis Battlehawks | 23 wins | 2024–present |

Single Season UFL leaders
| Leader | Player | Team | Record | Year |
|---|---|---|---|---|
| Passing yards | Luis Perez | Dallas Renegades | 2,307 passing yards | 2024–present |
| Passing touchdowns | Austin Reed | Dallas Renegades | 21 passing touchdowns | 2026–present |
| Rushing yards | Adrian Martinez | Birmingham Stallions | 528 rushing yards | 2024 |
| Rushing touchdowns | Deon Jackson | DC Defenders | 7 rushing touchdowns | 2025–present |
| Receiving yards | Hakeem Butler | St. Louis Battlehawks | 652 receiving yards | 2024–present |
| Receiving touchdowns | Cornell Powell; Tyler Vaughns | DC Defenders; Dallas Renegades | 7 receiving touchdowns | 2025–present |
| Receptions | Justin Hall | Houston Roughnecks | 62 receptions | 2024–present |
| Tackles | Tavante Beckett | San Antonio Brahmas | 89 tackles | 2024–present |
| Sacks | Cam Gill | Louisville Kings | 10 sacks | 2026–present |
| Interceptions | Corey Mayfield Jr. Major Burns | Louisville Kings; Houston Gamblers | 4 interceptions | 2026–present |
| Coaching wins | Skip Holtz | Birmingham Stallions | 9 wins | 2024–2025 |

UFL Attendance Records
| Year | Week | Team | Attendance |
|---|---|---|---|
| 2024 | 2 | St. Louis Battlehawks | 40,317 |
| 2024 | 10 | St. Louis Battlehawks | 34,379 |
| 2024 | 6 | St. Louis Battlehawks | 32,969 |
| 2024 | 8 | St. Louis Battlehawks | 32,403 |
| 2025 | 2 | St. Louis Battlehawks | 32,115 |
| 2024 | 4 | St. Louis Battlehawks | 31,757 |
| 2026 | 1 | St. Louis Battlehawks | 31,191 |
| 2025 | 5 | St. Louis Battlehawks | 30,406 |
| 2024 | Conference Finals | St. Louis Battlehawks | 30,237 |
| 2025 | 8 | St. Louis Battlehawks | 30,114 |

== League finances ==
The league was created as a "merger of equals", with the respective leagues' owners initially assuming 50% ownership of the newly formed UFL and The Walt Disney Company also holding a minority stake. As of 2025, Fox Corporation, RedBird Capital Partners and Impact Capital serve, in descending order of company share, as the league's three largest stakeholders, while the sovereign wealth fund of Qatar owns an unidentified ownership stake. RedBird Capital Partners owner Gerry Cardinale called it "a tremendous opportunity to achieve something unique. A legitimate shot at becoming one of the top professional leagues in the country after the big four leagues". In the event that the league, in the future, begins accepting individual team owners, it stated in 2024 that it would follow the Major League Soccer business model of buyers buying into the league itself and not separating the teams into individual business entities. One of the UFL's teams already operated on a system akin to that model, in that the Memphis Showboats were sponsored by multibillionaire FedEx CEO Fred Smith from the team's launch until Smith's death in June 2025. The league's ownership partners each provide "business services" to the league at no nominal charge to save costs.

In March 2024, Under Armour announced it had extended the multi-year agreement signed in 2023 with the XFL. Later that month, Michael Strahan's MSX brand was announced as the "Official Off-Field Apparel Partner". Other UFL's sponsors include: Westgate Resorts, Progressive Insurance, PepsiCo (Gatorade), The Coca-Cola Company (Simply Spiked), CBD Kratom, and Molson Coors. Johnson and Garcia also use the league to promote their own brands, Teremana Tequila and ZOA Energy Drink. On April 6, 2024 the league announced a partnership with the United States Army, who promised an estimated $11 million for jersey patch sponsorship and other promotional considerations. The Army chose not to renew its sponsorship for 2025, in part because Johnson failed to deliver the promised number of product placement spots in his personal social media platforms, but denied earlier reports of any dispute between the Army and the UFL, nor was there any attempt to claw back any money already spent (as the contract was structured such that the payment would be made after the season); the Army also refuted a false claim that the sponsorship had led to a decline in recruitment. In April Upper Deck announced it would release "2024 UFL Game Dated Moments Cards".

As of the start of the 2026 season, chairwoman Dany Garcia described the state of the league's finances as "not yet" close to profitability, but "closer" than it had been in years prior. The league's sponsors for 2026 included The Coca-Cola Company (through BodyArmor, previously owned by Repole), NoBull (another Repole-owned brand), New Era Cap Company (which has longstanding ties to league president Russ Brandon), DraftKings and Adidas.

The UFL has no aspirations of challenging or seeking a buy-in with the National Football League; co-owner Gerry Cardinale has stated that the UFL seeks to cooperate within the NFL ecosystem. It does maintain regular contact with the NFL, particularly through Troy Vincent, the league's executive vice president, who speaks with the UFL weekly.

=== Personnel ===
- Dany Garcia: Chairwoman
- Mike Repole: Director of business operations and self-proclaimed commissioner
- Russ Brandon: Executive Vice President of Football Operations
- Doug Whaley: General Manager
- Russ Giglio: Senior Director, Player Administration and Officiating Operations
- Jim Popp: Director of Player Administration
- Eric Shanks: Representative of Fox Corporation

== Broadcasting ==
In the United States, the television rights for the UFL are held by Fox Sports and ESPN, which held the rights to the USFL and XFL, respectively. NBC Sports, which had shared broadcast rights to the USFL with Fox Sports in 2022 and 2023, will not carry UFL games due to an increase in schedule conflicts, stemming from the proposed start date being slightly earlier than 2022 and 2023. There had been one year remaining on NBC's contract. ESPN will also air a weekly multi-platform post-game show. Both ESPN and Fox will carry audio simulcasts of their coverage on their Sirius XM Radio feeds, ESPN Xtra and Fox Sports Radio, respectively.

Beginning in the 2025 season, the Fox broadcast network will include the UFL as a permanent part of its Friday night schedule.

== Fan culture ==
Several of the UFL's teams past and present have developed fan cultures with unique traditions, including Louisville's "Kings' Court", Memphis's "Yacht Club", Birmingham's shirtless "Pyramid of Flesh", DC's beer snakes, and St. Louis's "ka-kaw" battle cry along with its embrace of the Battlehawks as a mutual rebuke to Stan Kroenke, who returned the NFL's Rams to California.

== Champions ==
UFL Champions
| Date | Winning Team | Score | Losing Team | Score | Stadium | Location | MVP | Attendance | Network | Viewership |
|---|---|---|---|---|---|---|---|---|---|---|
| June 16, 2024 | Birmingham Stallions | 25 | San Antonio Brahmas | 0 | The Dome at America's Center | St. Louis, Missouri | Adrian Martinez | 27,396 | Fox | 1.60 million |
| June 14, 2025 | DC Defenders | 58 | Michigan Panthers | 34 | The Dome at America's Center | St. Louis, Missouri | Jordan Ta'amu | 14,559 | ABC | 0.98 million |
| June 13, 2026 | Louisville Kings | 27 | DC Defenders | 20 | Audi Field | Washington, DC | Ian Wheeler | 19,023 | ABC | 0.98 million |

== Notes ==
Informational notes
