= 2023 New Orleans Breakers season =

American football season

- Owner: National Spring Football League Enterprises Co, LLC, (Fox Sports)
- General manager: Ryan Jones
- Head coach: John DeFilippo
- Home stadium: Protective Stadium

Results
- Record: 7–3
- League place: 2nd in South Division
- Playoffs: Lost Division Finals (at Stallions) 22–47

The 2023 New Orleans Breakers season was the New Orleans Breakers' second season in the United States Football League, their second at Protective Stadium, and their first under the head coach/general manager tandem of John DeFilippo and Ryan Jones. For the 2023 season, they improved upon their 6–4 record from the previous season by going 7–3, and lost to the Birmingham Stallions in the USFL South Division Championship Game for the second straight year. This time with the final score being 47–22 in favor of Birmingham.

== Offseason ==
=== Stadium plans ===
Shortly before the completion of the 2022 season, the USFL announced plans to move into two or four hubs for teams to play in. In November, the USFL was reportedly exploring options of having a hub in Metro Detroit, with possible locations being the Eastern Michigan Eagles' Rynearson Stadium and the Detroit Lions' Ford Field.

It was announced that the Breakers would be playing their games in Birmingham for the 2nd straight season. They share a hub with their South Division rivals, the Birmingham Stallions.

=== Draft ===
The Breakers clinched the fifth overall pick in the 2023 USFL draft and hold the fifth pick in each round.

The draft only included players that were 2023 draft eligible, contrasting with the 2022 draft, which was to build rosters. Also differing from the 2022 draft, players were not initially contracted with the USFL prior to the draft, meaning teams have to negotiate with players to retain their rights. As of February 26, 2023, no player drafted by the New Orleans Breakers has signed a contract with the team.

2023 New Orleans Breakers Draft
Round	Selection	Player	Position	College	Notes
1	5	Tyler Scott	Wide receiver	Cincinnati	
2	12	Noah Taylor	Linebacker	Virginia	
3	20	D. J. Ivey	Cornerback	Miami (FL)	
4	28	Keaton Mitchell	Running back	East Carolina	
5	36	Isaiah Moore	Linebacker	NC State	
6	44	Dante Stills	Defensive lineman	West Virginia	
7	52	Darius Hagans	Cornerback	Virginia State	
8	60	Jake Bobo	Wide receiver	UCLA	
9	68	Alex Palczewski	Offensive lineman	Illinois	
10	76	Tyler Baker-Williams	Cornerback	NC State	

=== Additions ===
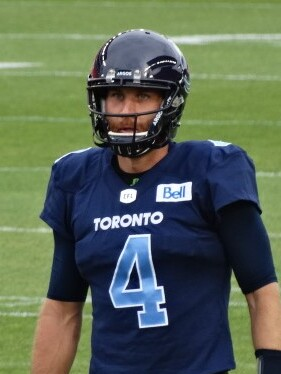
The Breakers signed McLeod Bethel-Thompson, who won 2 Grey Cup titles with the Toronto Argonauts in 2017 and 2022

Position	Player	Date
DB	Darion Slade	August 31
DL	Samuel Wright II	October 8
WR	Eli Stove	October 18
OL	Kenny Thomas	November 9
OL	Paul Adams	December 3
QB	Aqeel Glass	December 13
DE	Justus Reed	December 21
LB	Zakoby McClain	January 7
QB	Davis Cheek	January 14
WR	Reggie Davis	January 14
CB	Josh Valentine-Turner	January 20
S	Derrion Rakestraw	January 24
DT	Chris Richardson	January 24
LB	Jordan Brailford	January 28
OT	Tyler Roemer	January 28
OT	Salesi Uhatafe	January 31
DE	Ahmad Gooden	February 3
LB	Shaheed Salmon	February 3
OG	Kirk Kelley	February 9
OG	Clayton LeGault	February 9
OT	Lo Falemaka	February 10
RB	Peter Guerriero	February 10
S	Saquan Hampton	February 11
TE	Sage Surratt	February 15
WR	Hergy Mayala	February 15
WR	Richard Sindani	February 15
RB	Wes Hills	February 17
OT	Marcus Tatum	February 17
CB	Bryce Watts	February 19
QB	McLeod Bethel-Thompson	February 22
K	Matt Coghlin	March 3
OG	Khalique Washington	March 6
WR	Dee Anderson	March 19
WR	Breon Michel	March 19
DL	Keonte Schad	March 23
OT	Kai Absheer	March 28
S	Sidney McCloud	March 28
TE	Jared Scott	April 4

=== Subtractions ===
Position	Player	Date
LB	Christian Sam	July 8
CB	Ike Brown	July 20
TE	Sal Cannella	July 21
QB	Kyle Sloter	July 24
K	Taylor Bertolet	October 6
DE	Davin Bellamy	January 1
LB	Shareef Miller	January 1
DT	Shakir Soto	January 1
OT	Toree Boyd	February 9
RB	Jordan Ellis	February 9
DB	Dartez Jacobs	February 9
DE	T.J. Johnson	February 9
RB	Larry Rose III	February 9
CB	Manny Patterson	February 23
QB	Zach Smith	February 26
OG	Clayton LeGault	March 6
OL	Tim Coleman	March 28
DL	Samuel Wright II	March 28
OG	Donnell Greene	April 4
RB	Peter Guerriero	April 4
WR	Richard Sindani	April 4
S	Darion Slade	April 4
CB	Josh Valentine-Turner	April 4
OT	Lo Falemaka	April 10
DE	Ahmed Gooden	April 10
WR	Hergy Mayala	April 10
WR	Breon Michel	April 10

== Final roster ==
2023 New Orleans Breakers final roster
Quarterbacks: 1 McLeod Bethel-Thompson; 17 Davis Cheek; 10 Aqeel Glass; Running backs: 15 Cyrus Habibi-Likio; 31 Wes Hills; 6 Anthony Jones; Wide receivers: 9 Jonathan Adams; 80 Dee Anderson; 2 Johnnie Dixon; 16 Jovon Durante; 5 Lee Morris; 12 Eli Stove; Tight ends: 85 E. J. Bibbs; 88 Jared Scott; 13 Sage Surratt	Offensive linemen: 77 Paul Adams T/G; 50 Russell Baker T; 79 Kirk Kelley G; 65 Jack Kramer G; 74 Marquis Lucas G; 67 Steven Rowzee G; 63 Marcus Tatum T; 62 Salesi Uhatafe G/T; 59 Richard West T; Defensive linemen: 95 Jordan Brailford DE; 35 Djimon Brooks DT; 45 Justin Cates DE; 98 Connor Christian DT; 55 Reggie Howard DT; 44 Jacorey Johns DE; 97 Justus Reed DE; 94 Anree Saint-Amour DE; 90 Keonte Schad DE	Linebackers: 8 Nigel Chavis; 20 Vontae Diggs; 4 Jerod Fernandez; 11 Zakoby McClain; 56 Shaheed Salmon; Defensive backs: 3 Adonis Alexander CB; 14 Nevelle Clarke CB; 23 Jarey Elder S; 29 Saquan Hampton S; 22 Sidney McCloud S; 30 Derrion Rakestraw S; 7 Mike Stevens CB; 38 Alex Thomas CB; 21 James Wiggins S; Special teams: 60 Turner Bernard LS; 49 Matt Coghlin K; 19 Matt White P	Reserve lists: 59 Kai Absheer T Retired; 33 Greg Eisworth S (IR); -- Bryce Watts CB (DNR); 50 active, 3 inactive

== Staff ==
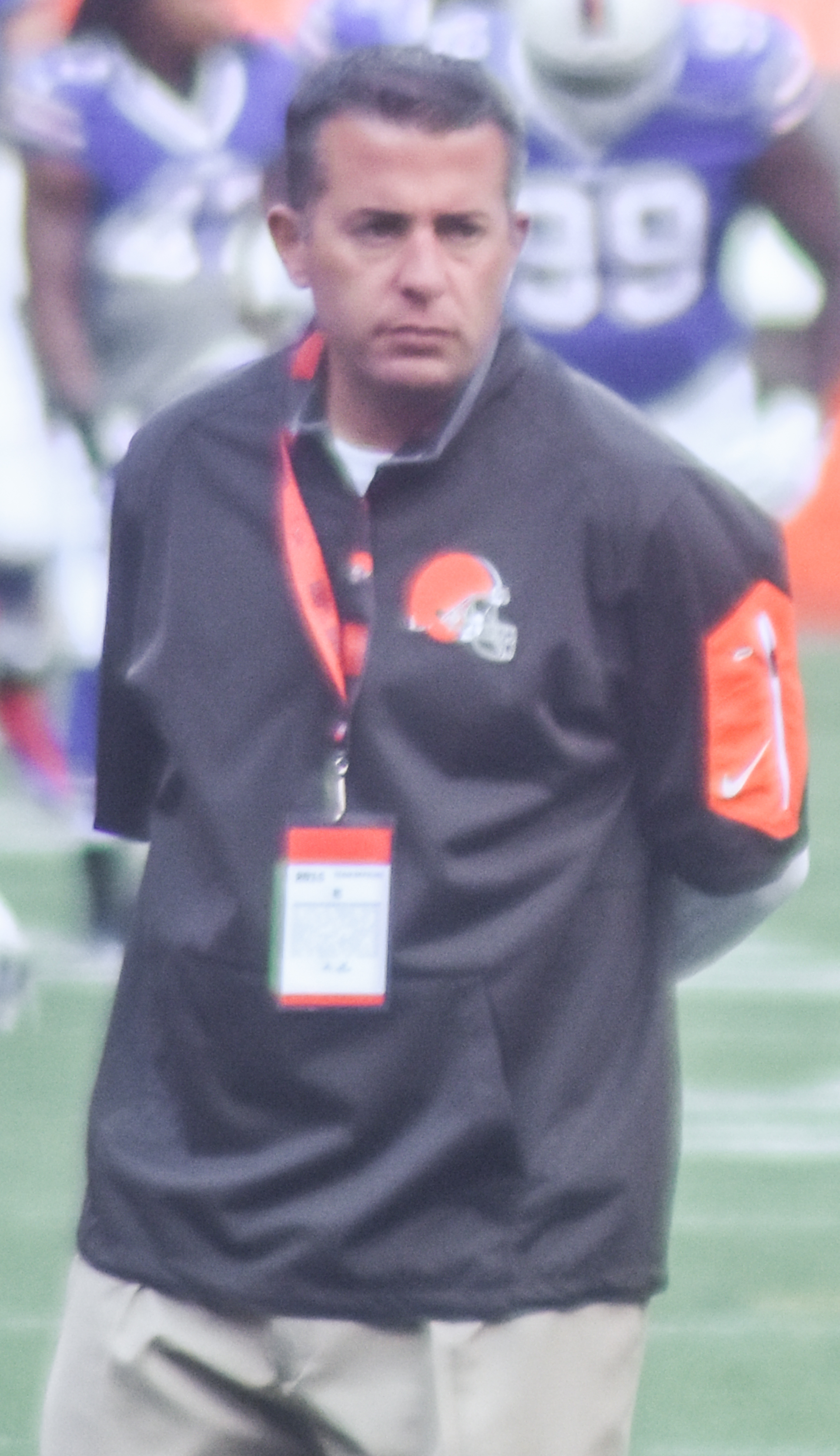
John DeFilippo will enter his first season as head coach.

On September 14, 2022, head coach Larry Fedora stepped down and announced that he would only return if all the USFL teams played in their home markets. The Breakers named John DeFilippo as head coach.

2023 New Orleans Breakers staff
Front office: General manager – Ryan Jones; Head coaches: Head coach/quarterbacks – John DeFilippo; Offensive coaches: Offensive coordinator/wide receivers – Doug Martin; Special teams/running backs – Kirk Doll; Tight ends/offensive quality control – TJ Vernieri; Offensive line/run game coordinator – Jim Turner	Defensive coaches: Defensive coordinator/secondary – Jon Tenuta; Defensive line – Cornell Brown; Linebackers – Zach Tenuta; Assistant defensive backs/defensive quality control – Hunter Hughes

== Schedule ==
=== Regular season ===
Week	Date	Time (ET)	Opponent	Result	Record	TV	Venue	Recap
1	April 16	6:30 p.m.	vs. Pittsburgh Maulers	**W** 22–15	1–0	FS1	Protective Stadium	Recap
2	April 22	12:30 p.m.	vs. **Houston Gamblers**	**W** 38–31	2–0	USA	Protective Stadium	Recap
3	April 29	12:30 p.m.	at **Birmingham Stallions**	**W** 45–31	3–0	USA	Protective Stadium	Recap
4	May 7	3:00 p.m.	at New Jersey Generals	**W** 20–17	4–0	NBC	Tom Benson Hall of Fame Stadium	Recap
5	May 14	3:00 p.m.	vs. **Memphis Showboats**	**L** 10–17	4–1	Fox	Protective Stadium	Recap
6	May 21	12:00 p.m.	at Philadelphia Stars	**L** 10–16	4–2	FS1	Ford Field	Recap
7	May 27	4:00 p.m.	vs. **Birmingham Stallions**	**L** 20–24	4–3	Fox	Protective Stadium	Recap
8	June 4	4:00 p.m.	vs. Michigan Panthers	**W** 24–20	5–3	Fox	Protective Stadium	Recap
9	June 10	3:00 p.m.	at **Memphis Showboats**	**W** 31–3	6–3	NBC, CNBC (Note: Rain delay caused the 2nd through 4th quarters to be shown on CNBC, due to local and primetime programming on NBC.)	Simmons Bank Liberty Stadium	Recap
10	June 18	1:00 p.m.	at **Houston Gamblers**	**W** 17–10	7–3	FS1	Simmons Bank Liberty Stadium	Recap

Bold indicates divisional opponent.

== Game summaries ==
=== Week 1: vs. Pittsburgh Maulers ===
Week 1: Pittsburgh Maulers at New Orleans Breakers – Game summary

Quarter	1	2	3	4	Total
Maulers	3	6	0	6	15
Breakers	6	3	6	7	22

at Protective Stadium

- Date: April 16
- Game time: 6:30 p.m. EDT
- Referee: Stuart Mullins
- TV announcers (FS1): Curt Menefee, Joel Klatt and Brock Huard

Game information

First quarter

- PIT – Nathan Hierlihy 37-yard field goal, 10:55. Maulers 3–0. Drive: 7 plays, 22 yards, 4:09.
- NO – Matt Coghlin 34-yard field goal, 5:51 Tied 3–3. Drive: 9 plays, 38 yards, 5:05.
- NO – Matt Coghlin 51-yard field goal, Breakers 6–3. Drive: 5 plays, 12 yards, 2:26.

Second quarter

- PIT – Kyahva Tezino 1-yard fumble return (Anthony Jones rush, forced by Reuben Foster) (Madre London rush failed), Maulers 9–6. Drive: 1 plays, 0 yards, 0:06.
- NO – Matt Coghlin 21-yard field goal, 1:19 Tied 9–9. Drive: 9 plays, 65 yards, 2:16.

Third quarter

- NO – Matt Coghlin 27-yard field goal, 9:21 Breakers 12–9. Drive: 10 plays, 66 yards, 5:43.
- NO – Matt Coghlin 28-yard field goal, 0:17 Breakers 15–9. Drive: 10 plays, 70 yards, 4:56.

Fourth quarter

- PIT – Isiah Hennie 82-yard punt return (Nathan Hierlihy kick failed), 4:49. Tied 15–15. Drive: 0 plays, 0 yards, 0:00.
- NO – Anthony Jones 2-yard pass from McLeod Bethel-Thompson (Matt Coghlin kick good), 1:08 Breakers 22–15. Drive: 7 plays, 50 yards, 3:24.

Top passers

- PIT – James Morgan – 6/15, 58 yards
- NO – McLeod Bethel-Thompson – 23/41, 302 yards, TD

Top rushers

- PIT – Duane Gary – 3 rushes, 34 yards
- NO – Anthony Jones – 19 rushes, 46 yards

Top receivers

- PIT– Tre Walker – 3 receptions, 42 yards
- NO – Sage Surratt – 5 receptions, 85 yards

The Breakers started their season against the Pittsburgh Maulers. The Maulers started with the ball and pulled off a surprise lateral from Tre Walker to Bailey Gaither to set up Pittsburgh at the New Orleans 41-yard line. The Maulers got their offense started a little before stalling out and taking a 37-yard field goal from Nathan Hierlihy to get the first points of the season. The Breakers got the ball in Pittsburgh territory due to a big return from Johnnie Dixon. The Breakers had their pass game rolling on the first drive, including a 37-yard pass from McLeod Bethel-Thompson to Jonathan Adams. However, a Boogie Roberts sack on 3rd down forced New Orleans to a field goal. On the next drive, Pittsburgh's offense got nothing going and were forced to punt. The punt however, was tipped by a Breaker which set up New Orleans inside the Pittsburgh 35. New Orleans' offense stalled out and the Breakers were again forced to only 3 points. In the 2nd quarter, none of the offenses were able to generate many yards. Reuben Foster of the Maulers forced a fumble off of Anthony Jones to take a 9–6 lead. New Orleans drove down the field with efficiency, but a red zone stand by the Maulers defense forced them to a 3rd field goal of the game. In the 2nd quarter, Breakers punter Matt White would appear to twist his ankle and not be able to return to the game, leading Matt Coghlin to start having to punt.

In the 3rd quarter, New Orleans started with the ball but the Maulers defense tightened up in the red zone again to force another short Matt Coghlin field goal. Pittsburgh's offense stalled out, and the Breakers marched down the field, but got stopped by the Maulers in the red zone again to force a 5th field goal from Matt Coghlin (tying the USFL record). In the 4th quarter, Pittsburgh started with the ball and moved it down the field well, but New Orleans has a goal line stand and forces a turnover on downs. New Orleans drives down the field but is forced to punt at Pittsburgh's 39-yard line. On that Coghlin punt, Maulers returner Isiah Hennie takes the punt 82-yards to the end zone to tie the game at 15. After that, the Breakers drove down the field and scored the only offensive touchdown of the entire game, a 2-yard touchdown pass from McLeod Bethel-Thompson to running back Anthony Jones to make the score 22–15. The Maulers would turn the ball over on downs to end the game.

With the win, New Orleans improved to 1–0 and 2nd place in the South Division. With the loss, the Maulers dropped to 0–1 and 3rd place in the North Division.

=== Week 2: vs. Houston Gamblers ===
Week 2: Houston Gamblers at New Orleans Breakers – Game summary

Quarter	1	2	3	4	Total
Gamblers	0	10	7	14	31
Breakers	0	10	14	14	38

at Protective Stadium

- Date: April 22
- Game time: 12:30 p.m. EDT
- Referee: Larry Smith
- TV announcers (USA): Paul Burmeister, Anthony Herron and Lewis Johnson

Game information

Second quarter

- NO – Wes Hills 19-yard run (Matt Coghlin kick good), 11:43 Breakers 7–0. Drive: 10 plays, 85 yards, 5:02.
- HOU – Nick Vogel 44-yard field goal, 8:15 Breakers 7–3. Drive: 6 plays, 20 yards, 3:22.
- NO – Matt Coghlin 27-yard field goal, 1:14 Breakers 10–3. Drive: 14 plays, 58 yards, 7:02.
- HOU – Justin Hall 25-yard pass from Kenji Bahar (Nick Vogel kick good), 0:37 Tied 10-10. Drive: 3 plays, 59 yards, 0:33.

Third quarter

- HOU – Anthony Ratliff-Williams 38-yard pass from Kenji Bahar (Nick Vogel kick good), 12:01 Gamblers 17-10. Drive: 5 plays, 54 yards, 2:59.
- NO – Sage Surratt 5-yard pass from McLeod Bethel-Thompson (Matt Coghlin kick good), 6:45 Tied 17-17. Drive: 9 plays, 68 yards, 5:16.
- NO – Johnnie Dixon 4-yard pass from McLeod Bethel-Thompson (Matt Coghlin kick good), 2:07 Breakers 24-17. Drive: 5 plays, 27 yards, 2:24.

Fourth quarter

- HOU – T.J. Pledger 1-yard run (Nick Vogel kick good), 6:42 Tied 24–24. Drive: 9 plays, 68 yards, 6:17.
- NO – Wes Hills 3-yard run (Matt Coghlin kick good), 3:42 Breakers 31–24. Drive: 6 plays, 57 yards, 3:00.
- HOU – Justin Hall 18-yard pass from Kenji Bahar (Nick Vogel kick good), 2:00 Tied 31-31. Drive: 3 plays, 50 yards, 1:42.
- NO – Wes Hills 14-yard run (Matt Coghlin kick good), 0:42 Breakers 31–24. Drive: 2 plays, 48 yards, 0:16.

Top passers

- HOU – Kenji Bahar – 18/30, 266 yards, 3 TD, 3 INT
- NO – McLeod Bethel-Thompson – 23/34, 251 yards, 2 TD

Top rushers

- HOU – T. J. Pledger – 18 rushes, 94 yards, 1 TD
- NO – Wes Hills – 18 rushes, 110 yards, 3 TD

Top receivers

- HOU – Justin Hall – 8 receptions, 110 yards, 2 TD
- NO – Sage Surratt – 11 receptions, 121 yards, 2 TD

The Breakers hosted their division rivals, the Houston Gamblers. The game would start slowfor both of the offenses, but on the first drive of the second quarter, Wes Hills would run for a 19-yard touchdown to give the Breakers the first points of the game. Houston responded with a field goal on the next drive. New Orleans would add a field goal on the next drive, and Houston would score a touchdown to tie the game at 10 at halftime.

The Gamblers got the second half going with a touchdown to get them the lead. The Breakers would respond with a touchdown of their own, then took advantage of an Adonis Alexander interception with a 4-yard touchdown pass from quarterback McLeod Bethel-Thompson to receiver Johnnie Dixon to take the lead back. In the 4th quarter, Houston scored a touchdown on a 1-yard T.J. Pledger run to tie the game at 24. New Orleans scores a touchdown on the very next drive to make it 31–24 in favor of the Breakers. Then, Kenji Bahar led a methodical passing drive to tie the game at 31. Wes Hills scored a late touchdown to give the Breakers a 38–31 lead which would end up as the final after Vontae Diggs got the game sealing interception. The Breakers moved to 2–0 with the win.

=== Week 3: at Birmingham Stallions ===
Week 3: New Orleans Breakers at Birmingham Stallions – Game summary

Quarter	1	2	3	4	Total
Breakers	14	10	14	7	45
Stallions	10	14	0	7	31

at Protective Stadium

- Date: April 29
- Game time: 12:30 p.m. EDT
- Referee: Derek Anderson
- TV announcers (USA): Paul Burmeister, Kyle Rudolph and Caroline Pineda

Game information

First quarter

- BHAM – Deon Cain 82-yard kick return (Brandon Aubrey kick good), 14:49 Stallions 7–0. Drive: 0 plays, 0 yards, 0:11.
- NO – Lee Morris 40-yard pass from McLeod Bethel-Thompson (Matt Coghlin kick good), 12:17 Tied 7-7. Drive: 5 plays, 53 yards, 2:32.
- BHAM – Brandon Aubrey 25-yard field goal, 8:50 Stallions 10–7. Drive: 6 plays, 54 yards, 3:29.
- NO – Wes Hills 1-yard run (Matt Coghlin kick good), 11:43 Breakers 14–10. Drive: 7 plays, 63 yards, 4:55.

Second quarter

- NO – Matt Coghlin 37-yard field goal, 7:56 Breakers 17-10. Drive: 4 plays, 6 yards, 1:56.
- BHAM – C. J. Marable 1-yard run (Brandon Aubrey kick good), 3:39 Tied 17–17. Drive: 4 plays, 25 yards, 1:20.
- NO – Dee Anderson 19-yard pass from McLeod Bethel-Thompson (Matt Coghlin kick good), 1:29 Breakers 24-17. Drive: 4 plays, 75 yards, 2:10.
- BHAM – Jace Sternberger 19-yard pass from Alex McGough (Brandon Aubrey kick good), 0:42 Tied 24-24. Drive: 7 plays, 66 yards, 0:47.

Third quarter

- NO – Jonathan Adams 34-yard pass from McLeod Bethel-Thompson (Matt Coghlin kick good), 10:57 Breakers 31-24. Drive: 7 plays, 54 yards, 4:03.
- NO – Wes Hills 1-yard run (Matt Coghlin kick good), 0:40 Breakers 38–24. Drive: 8 plays, 80 yards, 4:54.

Fourth quarter

- BHAM – Davion Davis 5-yard pass from Alex McGough (Brandon Aubrey kick good), 12:32 Breakers 38-31. Drive: 6 plays, 70 yards, 3:08.
- NO – Wes Hills 2-yard run (Matt Coghlin kick good), 4:56 Breakers 45–31. Drive: 11 plays, 69 yards, 7:36.

Top passers

- NO – McLeod Bethel-Thompson – 20/28, 283 yards, 3 TD, INT
- BHAM – Alex McGough – 17/36, 238 yards, 2 TD, INT

Top rushers

- NO – Wes Hills – 34 rushes, 196 yards, 3 TD
- BHAM – C. J. Marable – 6 rushes, 24 yards, TD

Top receivers

- NO – Jonathan Adams – 6 receptions, 75 yards, 2 TD
- BHAM – Davion Davis – 5 receptions, 123 yards, TD

The Breakers took on their division rivals, the Birmingham Stallions to determine who would sit in 1st place in the South Division. The Stallions received the opening kickoff, and Deon Cain took it 82 yards to open up the scoring early. New Orleans would respond with a 40-yard strike from McLeod Bethel-Thompson to Lee Morris to tie the game at 7. The teams traded scores throughout the rest of the 1st quarter. Birmingham got a field goal and New Orleans scored a touchdown. The 2nd quarter started off with more defense than the first quarter, with Birmingham forcing a punt and Adonis Alexander of the Breakers getting an interception. New Orleans got a field goal off of the interception. However, on the Breakers next offensive drive, McLeod Bethel-Thompson threw a pick to Donnie Lewis which led to a 1-yard touchdown run from C.J. Marable tied the game at 17. Both teams would get 7 more to make the score 24–24 at the half.

In the 3rd quarter, it would be all New Orleans. New Orleans scored a touchdown on the opening drive of the 2nd half. The defense forced a punt, then New Orleans scored another touchdown to make the score 38–24. In the 4th quarter, Birmingham attempted to make a comeback and brought the game to within 7, but a Wes Hills 2-yard touchdown run on a long 4th quarter drive iced the game for New Orleans. The Breakers would win 45–31 to give the Breakers sole possession of 1st in the South Division. It would also mark the first time the Breakers have beaten the Stallions since the 2022 USFL was founded.

=== Week 4: at New Jersey Generals ===
Week 4: New Orleans Breakers at New Jersey Generals – Game summary

Quarter	1	2	3	4	Total
Breakers	7	7	3	3	20
Generals	0	10	7	0	17

at Tom Benson Hall of Fame Stadium

- Date: May 7
- Game time: 3:00 p.m. EDT
- Referee: Adam Savoie
- TV announcers (NBC): Paul Burmeister, Michael Robinson and Corey Robinson

Game information
Top passers
- NO –
- NJ –

Top rushers

- NO –
- NJ –

Top receivers

- NO –
- NJ –

The Breakers will take on the New Jersey Generals in week 4.

== Standings ==
South Division
#		W	L	PCT	GB	DIV	PF	PA	STK
1	(y) Birmingham Stallions	8	2	.800	–	4–2	287	196	W5
2	(x) New Orleans Breakers	7	3	.700	1	4–2	237	184	W3
3	(e) Houston Gamblers	5	5	.500	3	2–4	223	236	L2
4	(e) Memphis Showboats	5	5	.500	3	2–4	190	213	L2
(x)–clinched playoff berth; (y)–clinched division; (e)–eliminated from playoff contention

=== Postseason ===
Round	Date	Time (ET)	Opponent	Result	Record	TV	Recap
Division Finals	June 25	7:00 p.m.	at Birmingham Stallions	L 22–47	0–1	Fox	Recap
