= 2024 USFL season =

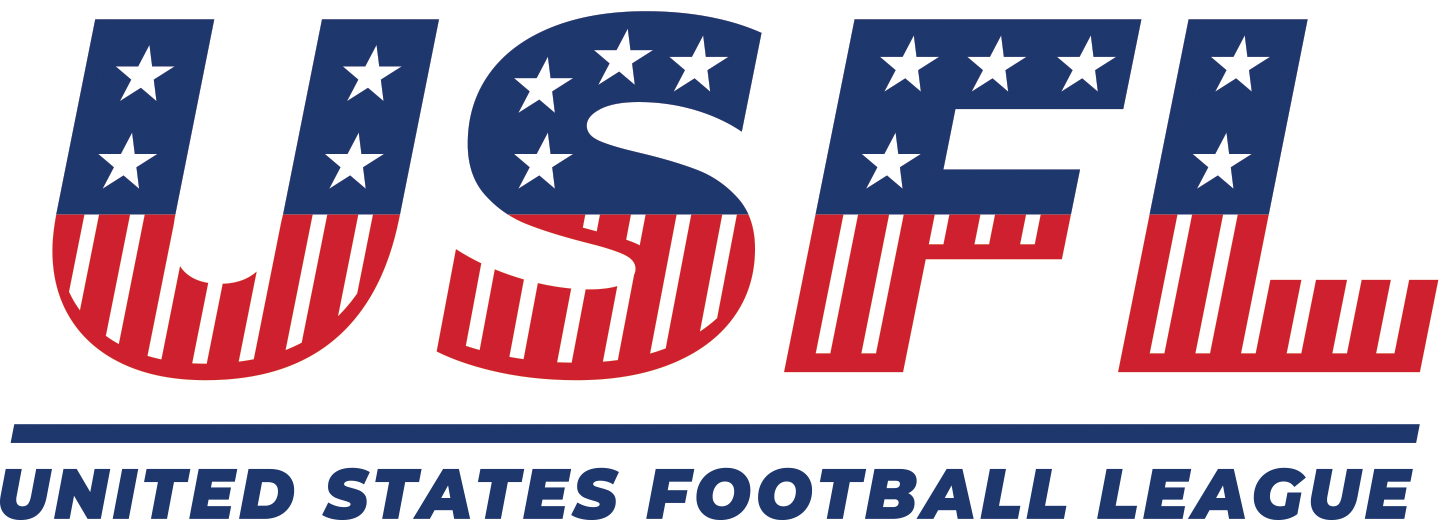
- League: United States Football League
- Sport: American football
- Games: 43 (40 regular-season games, 3 postseason games) (planned)
- Teams: 8 (planned)
- TV partner(s): Fox, FS1, NBC, USA
- Streaming partner(s): Fox Sports app, Peacock

Seasons
- 2023 2024 (UFL)

The 2024 USFL season was the planned third season of the United States Football League. The regular season was expected to start March 30, 2024, and to end in June 2024. The postseason was expected to begin in June 2024 and end with the 2024 USFL Championship Game in July 2024.

In September 2023, Axios reported that the XFL was in advanced talks with the USFL to merge the two leagues prior to the start of their 2024 seasons. On September 28, 2023, the USFL and XFL announced their intent to merge. On November 30, 2023, the leagues issued a statement that they "have completed the antitrust review process in connection with the proposed merger of the XFL and USFL and intend to play a combined season this spring kicking off on Saturday, March 30. We are now finalizing terms of the definitive agreement". On December 19, 2023, the USFL informed its players association that four of the league's eight extant teams, including all three teams that played the 2022 and 2023 seasons in their nominal home cities, would play in the combined season in 2024.

The merger was formally announced on Fox NFL Sunday on December 31, 2023, with both leagues cancelling their planned season while surviving teams will play the 2024 season in the newly formed United Football League.

== Offseason ==
On June 27, 2023, President of Football Operations Daryl Johnston confirmed in an interview that the league will return for the 2024 season. The 2023 season ended with Birmingham Stallions defeating the Pittsburgh Maulers in the 2023 USFL Championship Game to win their second league championship in as many years.

USFL average viewership in 2023 was down 16% from its debut season to 601,000 and 3% lower than the 2023 XFL season, despite having 28 over-the-air network games compared to eight for the XFL. The championship game also saw a significant decline in viewership from 2022 as the game averaged 1.2 million viewers across NBC, Peacock, and NBC Sports digital platforms. Johnston expressed disappointment and anger that the USFL was comparable to the XFL in ratings for the 2023 season, dismissing the XFL as "no competition" to the "far superior" USFL and questioning how "to be on par with our competition from a ratings standpoint in Year 2, I'm still trying to figure out: How did that happen? (...) they're not even close."

40 players who played in the 2023 USFL season signed contracts with NFL teams. Two players (LaBryan Ray and Brandon Aubrey) started the 2023 NFL season on active 53-man NFL rosters, 11 other players started the season on practice squads, and Isaiah Zuber was placed on injured reserve. Michigan Panthers WR Devin Ross was later signed to the Las Vegas Raiders practice squad but released one day later.

In late 2023, the league began discussions with Mike Repole to purchase a stake in the league.

=== Merger with the XFL ===
On September 19, 2023, Axios reported that the USFL was in advanced talks with the XFL—owned by a consortium led by Dwayne Johnson, Dany Garcia, and RedBird Capital Partners—to create a "merger of equals" between the two leagues before the 2024 USFL season kicks off in April, with an agreement potentially announced by the end of the month. The USFL registered a trademark for "National Spring Football League," the name of the USFL's parent company but speculated to also be a name for the potential merged league, that was made public September 27. On September 28, 2023, the USFL and XFL announced their intent to merge with the specific details of the merger to be announced at a later date. The merger would also require regulatory approval. In October 2023 the XFL filed a trademark application for the name "United Football League". On November 30, 2023, XFL chairwoman Dany Garcia announced via her Instagram page that the leagues had completed the antitrust review process to approve their merger, and the leagues will "play a combined season" on March 30, 2024. XFL President Russ Brandon will serve in the same capacity for the combined league, displacing Johnston.

On December 27, 2023, during the broadcast of the 2023 Holiday Bowl, Fox aired a clip of Jeff Brohm's "let's play football" speech from the original incarnation of the XFL and announced that details on its involvement in the new merged league would follow "very soon." Three days later, Fox clarified that further details would follow on the December 31 episode of Fox NFL Sunday. On December 31, the name of the combined league was confirmed as the United Football League, with each component league surviving as a conference within the UFL.

== Locations ==
Map of venues used in the USFL
1 Protective Stadium (Birmingham AL)
2 Simmons Bank Liberty Stadium (Memphis TN)
3 Ford Field (Detroit MI)

The league's second season was marked with the same complaints from the previous season of a lack of fans in the stands in some locations and "neutral site games", while the league announced "it will be maintaining their policy in partnership with their venues of not releasing attendance figures" during the season (including the championship game). Johnston acknowledged the issue before the championship game and said "it does motivate us to make sure we get our eight teams into their home markets as quickly as we can, but we can't rush it".

In an interview with Canton, Ohio, press Johnston mentioned potential expansion in the future: "We're in conversations with potential areas to expand into". He was asked specifically about Canton expansion and said, "Those are the conversations that have been had within the USFL family as we look at the future. Might there be an Ohio designation? Or a city designation? What works best as we continue to grow that relationship with the Pro Football Hall of Fame and the Hall of Fame Village?(...) Those definitely are conversations we've had. Nothing we've committed to, but to your point, and really the meat of this whole conversation, is getting our teams into the home markets."

In November 2023, officials with the Shrine on Airline in Metairie, Louisiana, indicated they had been in discussions with the USFL to host the Breakers' home games at the venue.

== Teams ==
On December 19, 2023, the USFL informed the USFL Players Association that the New Jersey Generals, Philadelphia Stars, Pittsburgh Maulers and New Orleans Breakers would be contracted as part of the USFL-XFL merger.

Team	Head coach	Hub city	Home stadium
North Division
Michigan Panthers	Mike Nolan	Detroit, Michigan	Ford Field
Philadelphia Stars	Bart Andrus	Detroit, Michigan	Ford Field
New Jersey Generals	Mike Riley	Canton, Ohio	Tom Benson Hall of Fame Stadium
Pittsburgh Maulers	Ray Horton	Canton, Ohio	Tom Benson Hall of Fame Stadium
South Division
Birmingham Stallions	Skip Holtz	Birmingham, Alabama	Protective Stadium
New Orleans Breakers	John DeFilippo	Birmingham, Alabama	Protective Stadium
Houston Gamblers	Curtis Johnson	Memphis, Tennessee	Simmons Bank Liberty Stadium
Memphis Showboats	Vacant	Memphis, Tennessee	Simmons Bank Liberty Stadium

== Players ==
For the 2024 season, training camp rosters will remain at 58 with 50 for regular season games, but 42 players will be active on game day, compared to 40 in the 2023 season.

During the 2023 championship weekend, Johnston revealed that the USFL was in talks for potential NFL partnership: "It make sense for there to be conversations about allowing key positions to come down to the USFL, but go directly back to the NFL team that holds their rights (...) These are things that are in infancy right now, but would be better for both leagues".

In July 2023, John Peterson, the league's Director of Player Personnel, revealed in an interview that each USFL team would have four designated NFL teams from which to select talent, as long as they signed with the team in the past three years, while former NFL players who didn't sign an NFL contract in the past four years (or more) are considered free agents.

The league's exclusive partnership agreement with HUB Football for scouting services came to an end in June 2023, when HUB's owner Don Yee decided to pull the plug on the operation, and the USFL started using the services of GRID Camps run by former HUB executive Tom Goodhines.

On December 22, 2023, the United Football Players Association announced it was ending its partnership with the United Steelworkers as a result of disagreements caused by the USFL–XFL merger, while the UFPA will start the process of being recognized as an official union. The USFLPA followed with a statement claiming that the UFPA had never been directly involved with any of the negotiations and were not authorized to speak on behalf of the USFLPA.

=== Compensation ===
Average salary for an active player will be approximately $61,910 with a maximum pay of $78,000 a year (includes training camp pay of $700/week, housing stipend of $1,600/month, 401(k) allocation, and bonus for winning the championship game). All player contracts are for two years, with an opt-out clause for the NFL at any time during the off-season.

=== Player movement ===
Transactions

==== Free agency ====
Unless they had re–signed, all players signed prior to, or during, the 2022 USFL season became free agents on October 1, 2023, at 12:00 midnight. Players who changed teams are listed below:

- Running backs: Trey Williams (New Jersey to Pittsburgh)
- Wide receivers: Cam Echols–Luper (New Jersey to New Orleans), Joe Walker (Michigan to New Jersey), Diondre Overton (Philadelphia to Pittsburgh)
- Tight ends: Marcus Baugh (Michigan to New Orleans)
- Offensive lineman: Broderick Hamm (Michigan to Pittsburgh), Sean Brown (Philadelphia to Pittsburgh)
- Defensive lineman: Ethan Westbrooks (Michigan to New Jersey)
- Defensive backs: Antonio Reed (Memphis to New Jersey)

==== Re-signings/new players ====
- On September 6, 2023, the Michigan Panthers signed 2023 USFL draft first overall pick Jarrett Horst.
- On September 11, 2023, the Houston Gamblers signed former Clemson CB Elijah Rodgers.
- On September 25, 2023, the Birmingham Stallions re–signed 2022 USFL Championship Game MVP Victor Bolden Jr. and All–USFL Punter Colby Wadman.
- On October 3, 2023, the Philadelphia Stars signed RB Seth Rowland, brother of WR Chris Rowland who re–signed with the Stars a few days prior.

=== Dispersal draft ===
On December 19, 2023, the USFL informed the USFL Players Association that four teams would be contracted, as part of the USFL-XFL merger. The transition to four teams will involve a three-phase player allocation process:

- Phase 1: Each remaining USFL team will identify up to 42 "protected" USFL Contract Players from their roster.
- Phase 2: Teams can then claim up to 20 additional "protected" players from non-surviving USFL teams. Procedures may be in place for handling multiple claims for the same player.
- Phase 3: A Dispersal draft will include all USFL players not “protected” in the earlier phases. Non-contracted players who have previously participated in the USFL or other leagues joining in 2024 must sign with the league before the draft.

The USFLPA also clarified that "Non-contracted players who previously played in the USFL & any other professional football league whose teams participate in the 2024 season may be signed by the league prior to the Dispersal Draft, for the purpose of participating in the Dispersal Draft".

== Coaches ==
=== Coaching changes ===
Team	Departing coach	Incoming coach	Notes
Memphis Showboats	Todd Haley		On October 23, 2023, the league announced it had fired Memphis Showboats head coach Todd Haley. Haley accrued a record of 9–11 (.450) as coach of the Showboats and their predecessors, the Tampa Bay Bandits.

== Media ==
=== Broadcasting ===
In December 2023, NBC Sports, which had shared broadcast rights to the league with USFL parent company Fox Corporation in 2022 and 2023, announced that it would not carry the league in the 2024 season due to an increase in schedule conflicts, stemming from the proposed start date being slightly earlier than 2022 and 2023. There had been one year remaining on NBC's contract.

The USFL-XFL merger would need to reconcile the XFL's existing exclusive contract with ESPN Inc., which grants that company exclusive rights to the XFL through 2027.

== See also ==
- 2024 XFL (planned) season
- 2024 UFL season
