= Ethan Westbrooks =

American football player (born 1990)

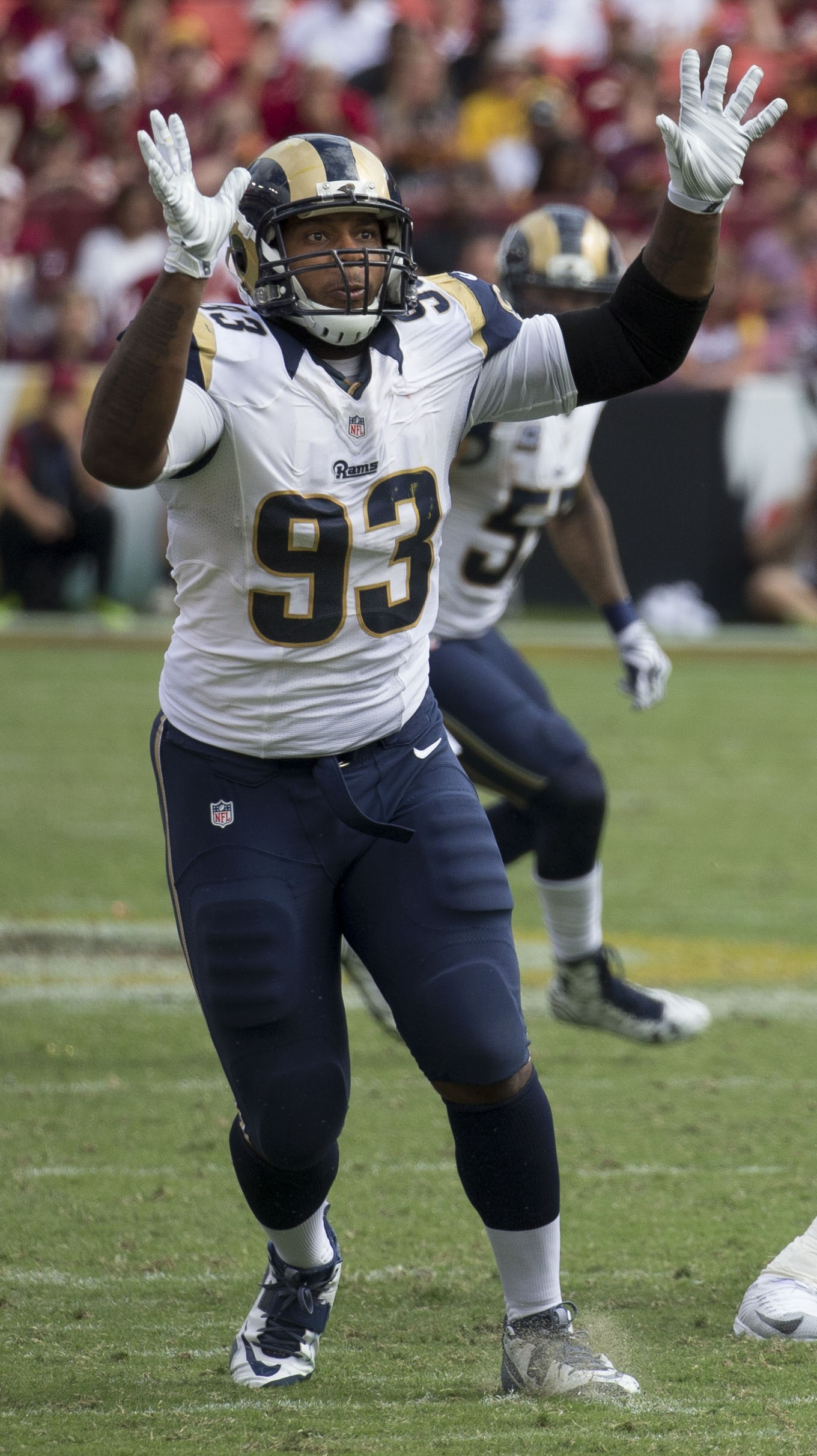
- Westbrooks with the St. Louis Rams in 2015

No. 93, 95, 91
- Position: Defensive end

Personal information
- Born: November 15, 1990 (age 35); Oakland, California, U.S.
- Listed height: 6 ft 4 in (1.93 m)
- Listed weight: 287 lb (130 kg)

Career information
- High school: Franklin (Elk Grove, California)
- College: San Joaquin Delta (2009); Sacramento City College (2010–2011); West Texas A&M (2012–2013)
- NFL draft: 2014: undrafted

Career history
- St. Louis / Los Angeles Rams (2014–2018); Oakland Raiders (2019)*; San Francisco 49ers (2020)*; Las Vegas Raiders (2021)*; New Orleans Saints (2021); Pittsburgh Maulers (2022); Michigan Panthers (2022–2023); New Jersey Generals (2024)*; Houston Roughnecks (2024)
- * Offseason or practice squad member only

Awards and highlights
- USFL Sportsman of the Year (2023); First-team Little All-American (2012); Second-team Little All-American (2013)

Career NFL statistics
- Total tackles: 79
- Sacks: 9
- Forced fumbles: 1
- Fumble recoveries: 1
- Defensive touchdowns: 1
- Stats at Pro Football Reference

Ethan Colbey Westbrooks (born November 15, 1990) is an American former professional football player who was a defensive end in the National Football League (NFL). He played college football for the West Texas A&M Buffaloes and signed with the St. Louis Rams as an undrafted free agent in 2014.

== Early life ==
Westbrooks attended and played football at Franklin High School in Elk Grove, California, where he earned All-league and All-conference honors. He also participated in track and field as he threw the shot put and discus.

== College career ==
Westbrooks began his college career at San Joaquin Delta College where he played defensive end ending his freshman season with 12 sacks. He later transferred to Sacramento City College where he played defensive end and earned All-league honors All-conference accolades and All-state in 2011.

He transferred to West Texas A&M where he was recognized as Lone Star Conference Defensive Lineman of the Year in 2012. Westbrooks had an outstanding first season in a Buffalo uniform as he played in all 15 games with 14 starts on the defensive line. He had 60 total tackles with 29 solo stops and led the team and conference with 28 tackles for loss for 139 yards. He led the team, the league, and the nation in sacks with a school-record 19.5 sacks for 116 yards. He had two pass breakups and a team-high 19 quarterback hurries, while forcing three fumbles.

As a senior in 2012 with opponents keying in on him, Westbrooks numbers dropped significantly in 2013 with 43 tackles, 19.5 for losses, and seven sacks. He was selected to the 2014 East–West Shrine Game, and earned Defensive MVP honors during the game with two sacks and two more tackles for loss.

While in college, Westbrooks got a face tattoo of a happy and sad face, captioned "Laugh now, Cry later", to incentivize himself to succeed in the NFL rather than being "a guy that has a tattoo on his face looking for another job".

== Professional career ==
Pre-draft measurables
Height	Weight	Arm length	Hand span	40-yard dash	10-yard split	20-yard split	20-yard shuttle	Three-cone drill	Vertical jump	Broad jump	Bench press
6 ft 3 1/2 in (1.92 m)	267 lb (121 kg)	33 1/4 in (0.84 m)	9 5/8 in (0.24 m)	4.72 s	1.66 s	2.82 s	4.67 s	7.30 s	33.5 in (0.85 m)	9 ft 2 in (2.79 m)	20 reps
All values from NFL Combine/West Texas A&M Pro Day

=== St. Louis / Los Angeles Rams ===
Westbrooks went undrafted in the 2014 NFL draft. He was signed as an undrafted free agent by the St. Louis Rams. He had a strong training camp and preseason, earning a spot on the 53-member active squad at the start of the 2014 season. During his rookie season in 2014, Westbrooks played 6 games making 5 tackles. In 2015, he played 13 games making 19 tackles with 2 sacks and a forced fumble.

On September 11, 2017, Westbrook signed a one-year contract extension with the Rams.

=== Oakland Raiders ===
On July 30, 2019, Westbrooks signed with the Oakland Raiders. He was released on August 31, 2019.

=== San Francisco 49ers ===
On February 12, 2020, Westbrooks was signed by the San Francisco 49ers, but was released two days later.

=== Las Vegas Raiders ===
On August 11, 2021, Westbrooks signed with the Las Vegas Raiders, but released five days later.

=== New Orleans Saints ===
On December 27, 2021, Westbrooks was signed to the New Orleans Saints practice squad.

=== Pittsburgh Maulers ===
On March 10, 2022, Westbrooks was drafted by the Pittsburgh Maulers of the United States Football League (USFL). He was transferred to the team's inactive roster on April 22, 2022, due to a quadriceps injury. He was moved back to the active roster on May 6. He was released on May 28, 2022.

=== Michigan Panthers ===
Westbrooks was claimed off waivers by the Michigan Panthers of the United States Football League (USFL) on May 28, 2022, and subsequently transferred to the team's inactive roster.

=== New Jersey Generals ===
On October 3, 2023, Westbrooks signed with the New Jersey Generals. The Generals folded when the XFL and USFL merged to create the United Football League (UFL).

=== Houston Roughnecks ===
On January 5, 2024, Westbrooks was selected by the Houston Roughnecks during the 2024 UFL dispersal draft. He was waived on August 19, 2024.
