= Madre Harper =

American football player (born 1997)

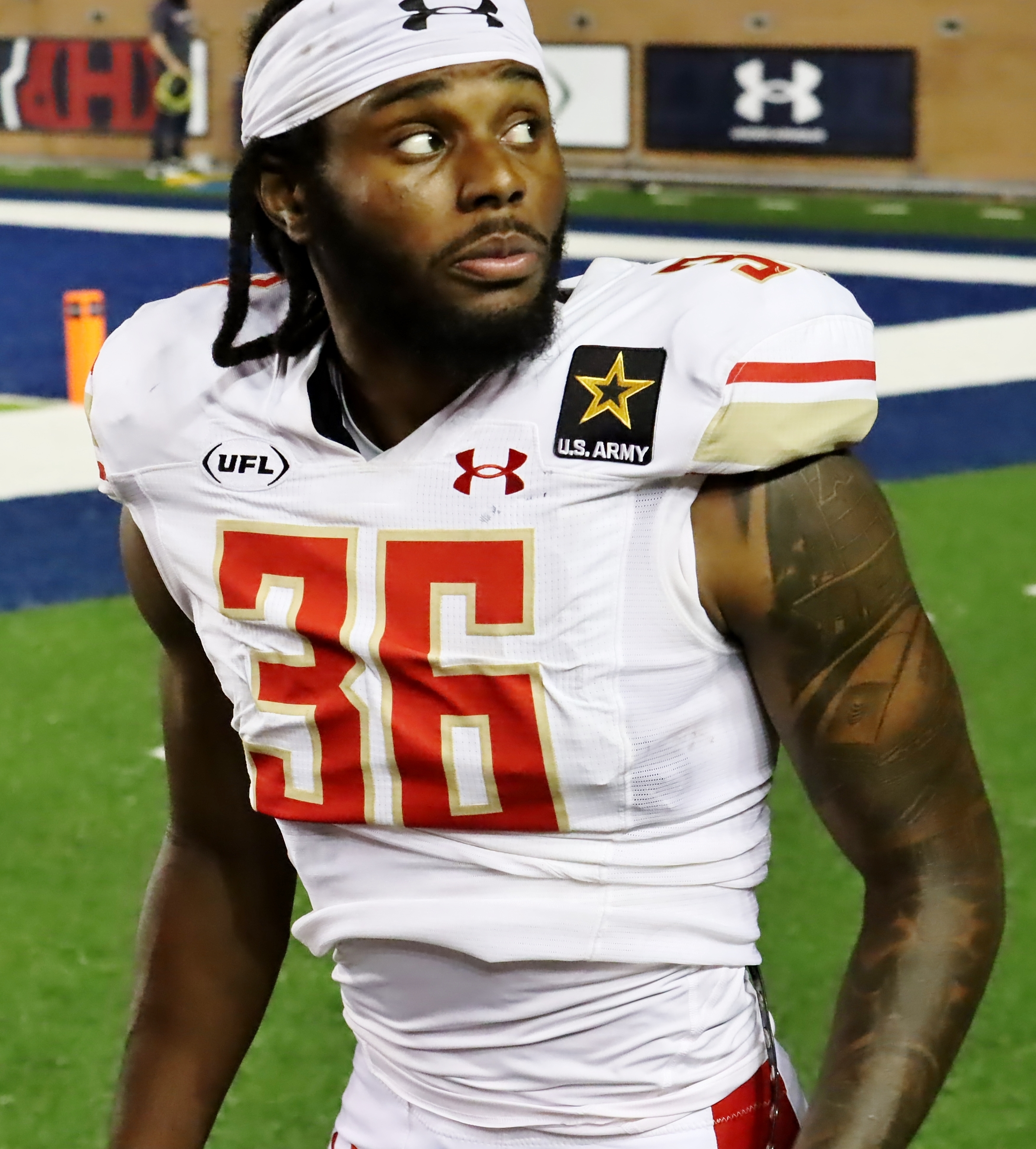
- Harper with the Birmingham Stallions in 2024

Profile
- Position: Cornerback

Personal information
- Born: October 13, 1997 (age 29); Irving, Texas, U.S.
- Listed height: 6 ft 2 in (1.88 m)
- Listed weight: 196 lb (89 kg)

Career information
- High school: Lamar (Arlington, Texas)
- College: Oklahoma State (2016–2017); Southern Illinois (2018–2019)
- NFL draft: 2020: undrafted

Career history
- Las Vegas Raiders (2020); New York Giants (2020); Las Vegas Raiders (2021)*; Carolina Panthers (2021–2022)*; Pittsburgh Steelers (2023)*; Birmingham Stallions (2024–2025)
- * Offseason or practice squad member only

Awards and highlights
- UFL champion (2024)

Career NFL statistics
- Games played: 9
- Total tackles: 4
- Stats at Pro Football Reference

Madre Madison Harper (born October 13, 1997) is an American professional football cornerback. He was signed by the Las Vegas Raiders as an undrafted free agent in 2020 following his college football career with the Southern Illinois Salukis.

== Professional career ==
Pre-draft measurables
Height	Weight	Arm length	Hand span	40-yard dash	10-yard split	20-yard split	20-yard shuttle	Three-cone drill	Vertical jump	Broad jump	Bench press
6 ft 1 3/4 in (1.87 m)	196 lb (89 kg)	33 7/8 in (0.86 m)	9 3/4 in (0.25 m)	4.43 s	1.60 s	2.63 s	4.25 s	6.88 s	40.0 in (1.02 m)	11 ft 2 in (3.40 m)	14 reps
All values from Pro Day

=== Las Vegas Raiders (first stint) ===
Harper signed with the Las Vegas Raiders as an undrafted free agent following the 2020 NFL draft on May 5, 2020. He was waived during final roster cuts on September 5, 2020, and signed to the team's practice squad the next day. He was elevated to the active roster on September 26 for the team's week 3 game against the New England Patriots, but was ruled inactive for the game, and reverted to the practice squad on September 28. He terminated his practice squad contract with the Raiders on September 29 in order to sign with the New York Giants.

=== New York Giants ===
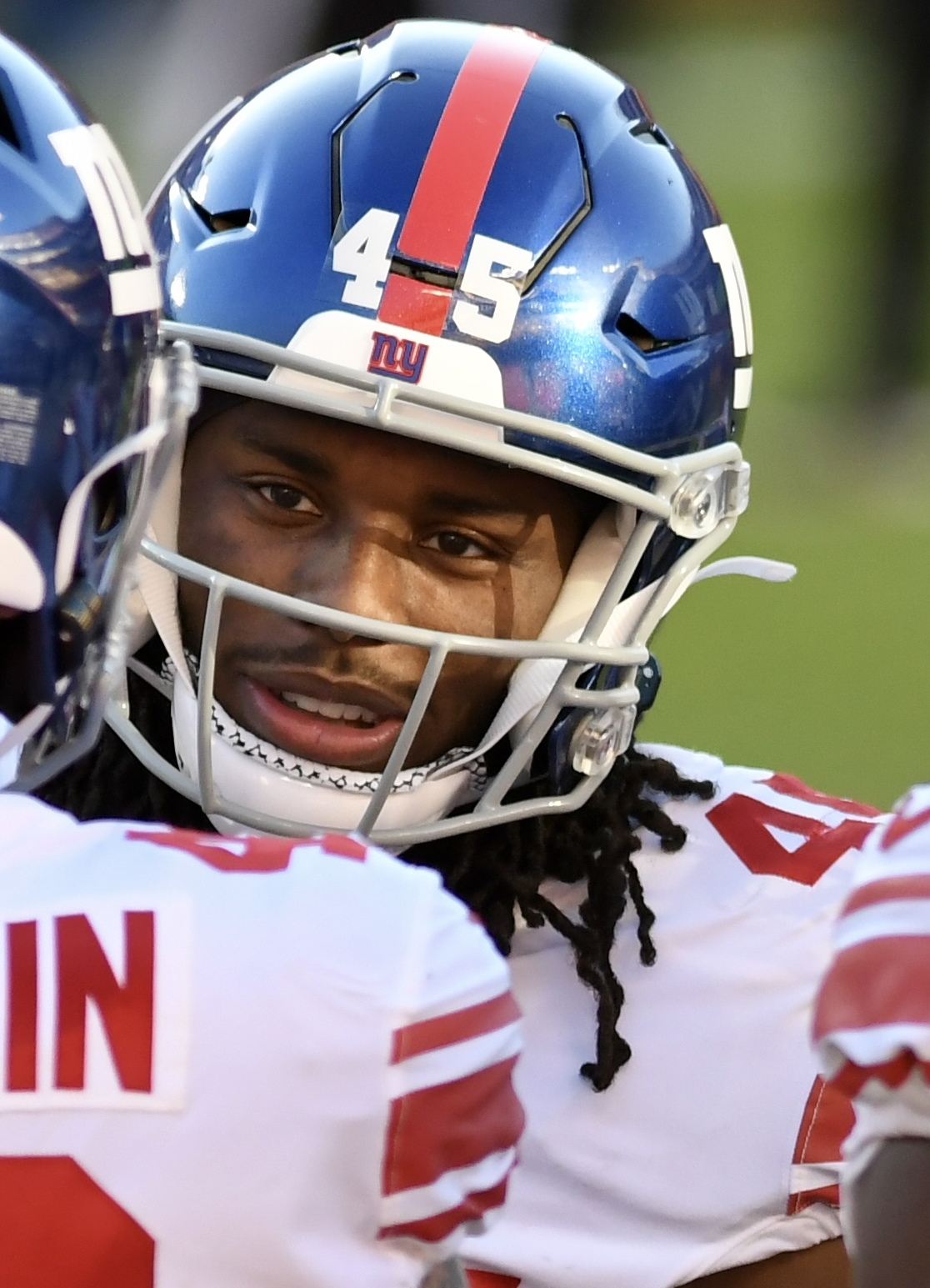
Harper with the Giants in 2020

Harper signed to the New York Giants' active roster on October 1, 2020. On December 11, 2020, Harper was placed on injured reserve. On January 2, 2021, Harper was activated off of injured reserve.He was released on August 31 He signed a contract extension with the Giants on January 4, 2021.

On August 31, 2021, Harper was waived by the Giants.

=== Las Vegas Raiders (second stint) ===
On September 2, 2021, Harper was signed to the Las Vegas Raiders practice squad. He was released on September 15.

=== Carolina Panthers ===
On September 28, 2021, Harper was signed to the Carolina Panthers practice squad. He signed a reserve/future contract with the Panthers on January 10, 2022.

On August 30, 2022, Harper was waived by the Panthers and signed to the practice squad the next day.

=== Pittsburgh Steelers ===
On January 11, 2023, Harper signed a reserve/future contract with the Pittsburgh Steelers. On August 26, 2023, Harper was released.

=== Birmingham Stallions ===
On October 5, 2023, Harper signed with the Birmingham Stallions of the United States Football League. He was selected by the Stallions in the sixth round of the Super Draft portion during the 2024 UFL dispersal draft. He re-signed with the team on August 14, 2024.

On May 21, 2025, Harper was placed on injured reserve.
