= Diondre Overton =

American football player (1998–2024)

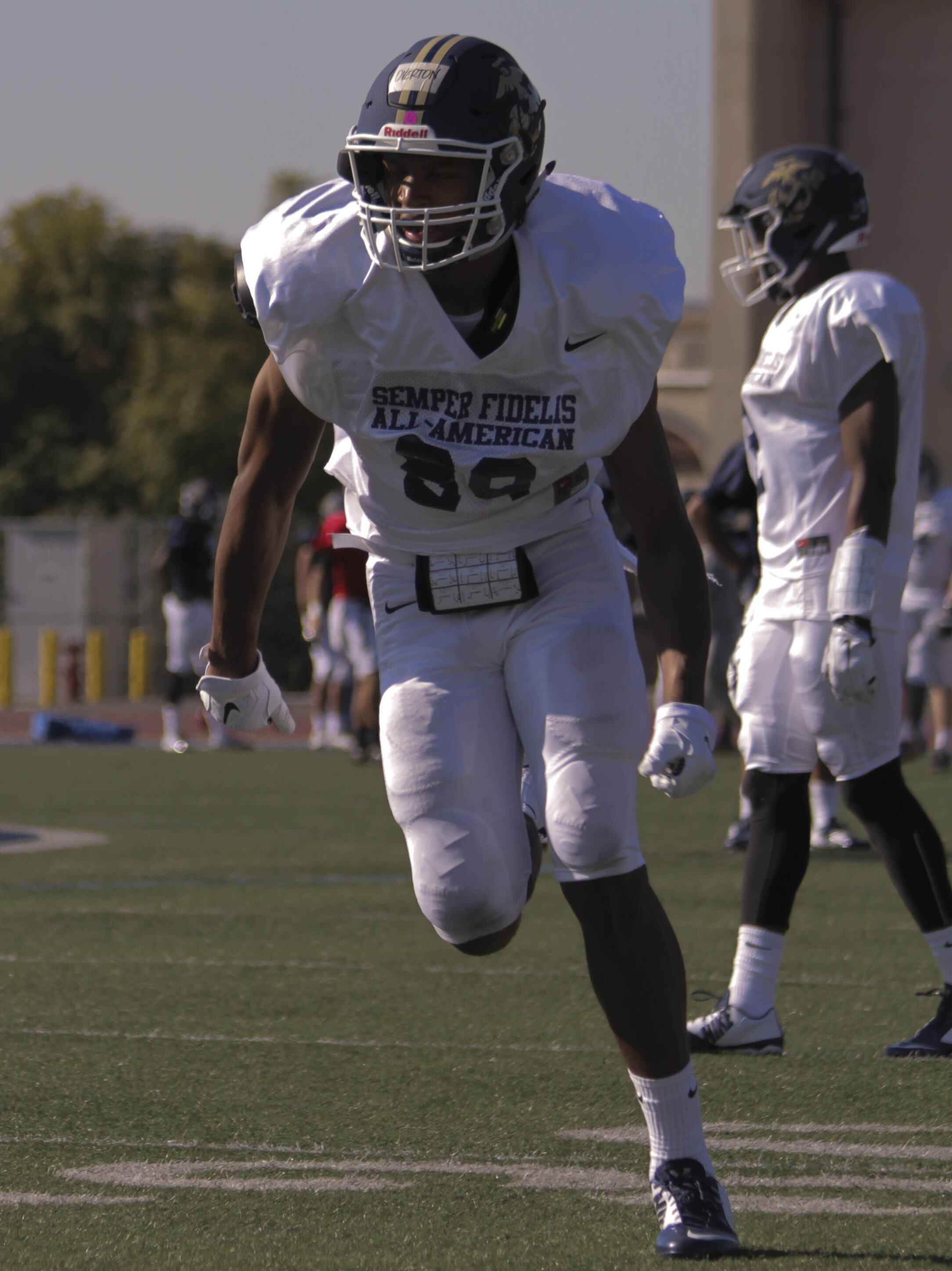
- Overton in 2015

No. 14, 16
- Position: Wide receiver

Personal information
- Born: April 19, 1998; Greensboro, North Carolina, U.S.
- Died: September 7, 2024 (aged 26); Greensboro, North Carolina, U.S.
- Listed height: 6 ft 5 in (1.96 m)
- Listed weight: 210 lb (95 kg)

Career information
- High school: Page (Greensboro)
- College: Clemson (2016–2019)
- NFL draft: 2020: undrafted

Career history
- Hamilton Tiger-Cats (2021)*; Vienna Vikings (2021); Philadelphia Stars (2022–2023); Pittsburgh Maulers (2024)*; Memphis Showboats (2024)
- * Offseason or practice squad member only

Awards and highlights
- CFP national champion (2016, 2018)

Diondre Overton (April 19, 1998 – September 7, 2024) was an American professional football player. After playing college football for the Clemson Tigers, he spent time with the Hamilton Tiger-Cats, Vienna Vikings, Philadelphia Stars, Pittsburgh Maulers, and Memphis Showboats.

== Early life and college ==
Overton was born on April 19, 1998, in Greensboro, North Carolina. He attended Walter Hines Page Senior High School in Greensboro, North Carolina, where he competed in football and basketball. As a junior, he averaged 14.6 points per game in basketball and made 31 catches for 577 yards in football. As a senior in football, he made 78 receptions for 1,251 yards and scored 15 touchdowns. He was the number four overall prospect in the state according to 247Sports.

Overton committed to Clemson University over offers from NC State, North Carolina, South Carolina, and Tennessee. As a freshman in 2016, he made two catches for 48 yards and scored a touchdown on his first career reception. In 2017, Overton played in 14 games and made 14 catches for 178 yards. As a junior in 2018, he caught 14 passes and scored three touchdowns while gaining 199 yards in 14 games.

As a senior in 2019, Overton recorded 22 catches for 352 yards and scored three touchdowns, appearing in 15 games with five starts. He was voted a team captain and was an Academic All-Atlantic Coast Conference selection. In a win against Boston College, he tied the school record with three touchdown catches, making a career-high 119 yards to earn offensive player of the game and Atlantic Coast Conference receiver of the week honors.

Overton won two national championships at Clemson (in 2016 and 2018), and finished his college career with 52 catches for 777 yards and seven touchdowns.

== Professional career ==
After spending 2020 out of football, Overton was signed by the Hamilton Tiger-Cats of the Canadian Football League in June 2021. He was released shortly afterwards.

In November 2021, Overton was signed by the Vienna Vikings of the European League of Football.

Overton was selected by the Philadelphia Stars of the United States Football League (USFL) in the 16th round of the 2022 USFL draft. He was ruled inactive for the game against the Tampa Bay Bandits on May 21, 2022, with a hamstring strain.

On October 4, 2023, Overton signed with the Pittsburgh Maulers of the USFL. The Maulers folded when the XFL and USFL merged to create the United Football League (UFL).

On January 5, 2024, Overton was selected by the Memphis Showboats during the 2024 UFL dispersal draft.

=== Statistics ===
USFL/UFL statistics
| Year | Team | Games | | Receiving | | | | |
| Year | Team | GP | GS | Rec | Yds | Avg | Lng | TD |
|---|---|---|---|---|---|---|---|---|
| 2022 | PHI | 6 | 5 | 12 | 200 | 16.7 | 41 | 3 |
| 2023 | PHI | 10 | 9 | 30 | 333 | 11.1 | 37 | 2 |
| 2024 | MEM | | | 3 | 33 | 11.0 | 26 | 0 |
| Career | | 16 | 14 | 45 | 566 | 12.6 | 41 | 5 |

== Death ==
On September 7, 2024, Overton was shot and killed while attending a party in Greensboro. He was 26 years old. As of January 2026, his alleged shooter was awaiting trial for first-degree murder.

== See also ==
- List of gridiron football players who died during their careers
