= Levi Bell =

American football player (born 1999)

Profile
- Position: Defensive lineman

Personal information
- Born: August 6, 1999 (age 27); Cedar Park, Texas, U.S.
- Listed height: 6 ft 0 in (1.83 m)
- Listed weight: 270 lb (122 kg)

Career information
- High school: Cedar Park
- College: College of Idaho (2018); Tyler Junior College (2019); Louisiana Tech (2020–2021); Texas State (2022)
- NFL draft: 2023: undrafted

Career history
- Baltimore Ravens (2023)*; Michigan Panthers (2023); Seattle Seahawks (2023–2024)*; Michigan Panthers (2024); Indianapolis Colts (2024)*; Michigan Panthers (2025); BC Lions (2025–2026)
- * Offseason or practice squad member only

Awards and highlights
- Second-team All-Sun Belt (2022)
- Stats at Pro Football Reference
- Stats at CFL.ca

Levi Russo Bell (born August 6, 1999) is an American former professional football defensive lineman. He played college football for the College of Idaho Yotes, Tyler Apaches, Louisiana Tech Bulldogs and the Texas State Bobcats. Bell also had stints in the National Football League (NFL) with the Baltimore Ravens, Seattle Seahawks and the Indianapolis Colts. He was selected by the Michigan Panthers in the sixth round of the 2023 USFL draft, and played for the team on three occasions.

== College career ==
Bell played college football for the College of Idaho Yotes in 2018, Tyler Apaches in 2019, Louisiana Tech Bulldogs from 2020 to 2021, and for the Texas State Bobcats in 2022. He started his college career at the College of Idaho in the NAIA, making 17 tackles, 1.5 sacks, and a fumble recovery in seven games. Bell then transferred to the JUCO school Tyler Junior College and dressed in nine games, registering 41 tackles, three sacks and a fumble recovery.

He later transferred to Louisiana Tech, playing in 13 games in two seasons, making 27 tackles, four sacks and a fumble recovery. In 2022, Bell transferred again, this time landing at Texas State where he set career highs. He played in 12 games recording 66 tackles, including 13.5 tackles for a loss and five sacks. Bell garnered second-team All-Sun Belt honors as a defensive tackle in his final season.

== Professional career ==
Pre-draft measurables
Height	Weight	Arm length	Hand span	Wingspan	40-yard dash	10-yard split	20-yard split	20-yard shuttle	Three-cone drill	Vertical jump	Broad jump	Bench press
5 ft 11 1/2 in (1.82 m)	262 lb (119 kg)	31 3/8 in (0.80 m)	9 1/2 in (0.24 m)	6 ft 3 1/4 in (1.91 m)	4.59 s	1.53 s	2.53 s	4.40 s	7.32 s	37.5 in (0.95 m)	10 ft 7 in (3.23 m)	33 reps
All values from Pro Day

=== Baltimore Ravens ===
After going undrafted in the 2023 NFL draft, Bell signed with the Baltimore Ravens as an undrafted free agent on May 4, 2023. He was waived on May 8, 2023.

=== Michigan Panthers (first stint) ===
On February 21, 2023, Bell was selected by Michigan Panthers with the 40th overall pick in the sixth round of the 2023 USFL draft, and was placed on the teams' inactive list. On May 10, 2023, Bell signed with the Panthers and went on to appear in six games, making 16 tackles and four sacks. He was released on July 25, 2023.

=== Seattle Seahawks ===
On July 26, 2023, Bell signed with Seattle Seahawks. On August 30, 2023, Bell was waived and signed to the Seahawks' practice squad. On November 27, 2023, Bell was placed on the Seahawks' practice squad/injured list. He rejoined the practice squad on December 27, 2024, where he spent the remainder of the 2023 NFL season. On January 8, 2024, Bell signed a reserve/future contract to extend his tenure with the Seahawks. He was waived on May 1, 2024.

=== Michigan Panthers (second stint) ===
On May 15, 2024, Bell re-signed with the Panthers. He did not appear in any games for the Panthers, and was released on July 30, 2024.

=== Indianapolis Colts ===
On July 31, 2024, Bell signed with the Indianapolis Colts. He was released on August 27, 2025, as part of roster cutdowns.

=== Michigan Panthers (third stint) ===
On October 30, 2024, Bell again re-signed with the Panthers. He went on to appear in four games, making four tackles, including one tackle for loss, before being released on May 19, 2025.

=== BC Lions ===
On August 28, 2025, Bell signed the BC lions of the Canadian Football League (CFL). He was initially signed to a practice roster contract but was immediately requisitioned to the active roster, as the Lions had just suffered multiple injuries to their defensive line simultaneously. On July 3, 2026, Bell was placed on the Lions' reserve roster. He rejoined the active roster on July 16, 2026. On July 24, 2026, Bell was placed on the Lions' 1-game injured list. He rejoined the active roster on August 7, 2026. On October 2, 2026, Bell was again placed on the Lions' 1-game injured list.

=== Retirement ===
On November 6, 2026, the BC lions announced Bell had retired from professional football.
