= Isaiah Land =

American football player (born 2000)

No. 58 – Dallas Cowboys
- Position: Outside linebacker
- Roster status: Practice squad

Personal information
- Born: February 5, 2000 (age 26); Buffalo, New York, U.S.
- Listed height: 6 ft 3 in (1.91 m)
- Listed weight: 245 lb (111 kg)

Career information
- High school: Grayson (Loganville, Georgia)
- College: Florida A&M (2018–2022)
- NFL draft: 2023: undrafted

Career history
- Dallas Cowboys (2023)*; Indianapolis Colts (2023–2024); Dallas Cowboys (2025–present)*
- * Offseason or practice squad member only

Awards and highlights
- Buck Buchanan Award (2021); First-team FCS All-American (2021); SWAC Defensive Player of the Year (2021); 2× First-team All-SWAC (2021, 2022)

Career NFL statistics as of 2023
- Total tackles: 6
- Sacks: 1
- Stats at Pro Football Reference

Isaiah Land (born February 5, 2000) is an American professional football outside linebacker for the Dallas Cowboys of the National Football League (NFL). He played college football for the Florida A&M Rattlers.

== Early life ==
Land was born in Buffalo, New York and attended Grayson High School in Loganville, Georgia.

== College career ==
Land redshirted his true freshman season at Florida A&M. As a redshirt junior he won the Buck Buchanan Award as the best defensive player in the FCS after recording 25.5 tackles for loss and 19 sacks. After the season, Land entered the NCAA portal. He ultimately decided to return to Florida A&M, despite receiving multiple Power Five offers. Land was ruled academically ineligible along with 24 other Florida A&M players at the beginning of the 2022 season. Land was eventually ruled eligible and finished the season with 23 tackles, 12 tackles for loss, and eight sacks in nine games played.

== Professional career ==
Pre-draft measurables
| Height | Weight | Arm length | Hand span | Wingspan | 40-yard dash | 10-yard split | 20-yard split | 20-yard shuttle | Three-cone drill | Vertical jump | Broad jump | Bench press |
|---|---|---|---|---|---|---|---|---|---|---|---|---|
| 6 ft 3 1/2 in (1.92 m) | 236 lb (107 kg) | 32 1/2 in (0.83 m) | 9 1/4 in (0.23 m) | 6 ft 5 in (1.96 m) | 4.62 s | 1.65 s | 2.67 s | 4.43 s | 7.20 s | 34.5 in (0.88 m) | 10 ft 6 in (3.20 m) | 21 reps |
All values from NFL Combine/Pro Day

Land was selected by the Pittsburgh Maulers in the fifth round in the 2023 USFL draft, but did not sign with the team and instead prepared for the NFL draft.

=== Dallas Cowboys ===
Land was signed by the Dallas Cowboys as an undrafted free agent on April 29, 2023, shortly after the conclusion of the 2023 NFL draft. He was waived by the Cowboys as a part of final roster cuts on August 29.

=== Indianapolis Colts ===
Land was claimed off waivers by the Indianapolis Colts on August 30, 2023.

On August 26, 2025, Land was waived by the Colts as part of final roster cuts.

=== Dallas Cowboys (second stint) ===
On August 27, 2025, Land signed with the Dallas Cowboys' practice squad. He signed a reserve/future contract with the Cowboys on January 6, 2026. On August 30, Land was waived by the Cowboys as a part of final roster cuts; he was re–signed to the team's practice squad the next day.
