= Jordan Brailford =

American football player (born 1995)

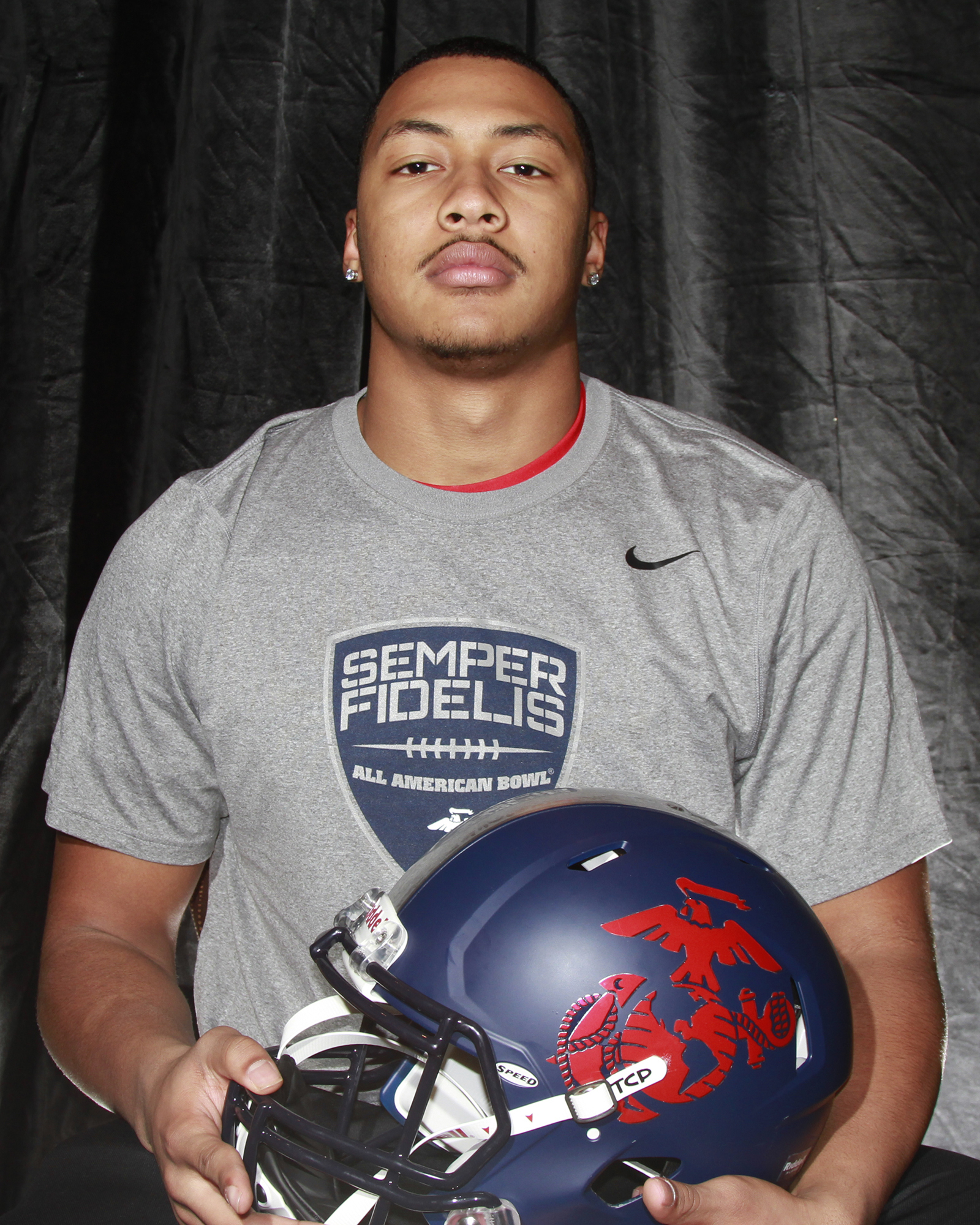
- Brailford c. 2014

No. 94
- Position: Linebacker

Personal information
- Born: October 9, 1995 (age 31); Tulsa, Oklahoma, U.S.
- Listed height: 6 ft 3 in (1.91 m)
- Listed weight: 252 lb (114 kg)

Career information
- High school: Booker T. Washington (Tulsa)
- College: Oklahoma State (2014–2018)
- NFL draft: 2019: 7th round, 253rd overall pick

Career history
- Washington Redskins / Football Team (2019–2020); Minnesota Vikings (2020); Atlanta Falcons (2021–2022)*; New Orleans Breakers (2023); Memphis Showboats (2024)*
- * Offseason or practice squad member only

Awards and highlights
- First-team All-Big 12 (2018); Second-team All-Big 12 (2017)

Career NFL statistics
- Total tackles: 2
- Forced fumbles: 1
- Fumble recoveries: 1
- Stats at Pro Football Reference

Jordan L. Brailford (born October 9, 1995) is an American former professional football player who was a linebacker in the National Football League (NFL). He played college football for the Oklahoma State Cowboys and was selected by the Washington Redskins in the seventh round of the 2019 NFL draft.

== Early life and college ==
A 3-star defensive end recruit from Tulsa, Oklahoma, Brailford committed to Oklahoma State to play college football over offers from Baylor, Kansas State, Texas Tech, Tulsa, and Washington State.

At Oklahoma State, Brailford played in 29 games, recording 113 tackles, 26.5 tackles for loss, 14 sacks, one interception, two pass deflections, and two forced fumbles. He was voted Second-Team All-Big 12 in 2017 and First-Team All-Big 12 in 2018.

== Professional career ==
=== Washington Redskins / Football Team ===
Brailford was selected by the Washington Redskins in the seventh round (253rd overall) of the 2019 NFL draft. He signed his rookie contract with the team on May 2, 2019. He was placed on injured reserve on September 1, 2019. On September 5, 2020, Brailford was waived by Washington and signed to the practice squad the next day.

=== Minnesota Vikings ===
On October 13, 2020, Brailford was signed by the Minnesota Vikings off Washington's practice squad. In Week 13 against the Jacksonville Jaguars, Brailford forced and recovered a fumble on Mike Glennon. He was waived on August 15, 2021.

=== Atlanta Falcons ===
On December 29, 2021, Brailford was signed to the Atlanta Falcons practice squad. He signed a reserve/future contract following the season's end. He was waived on August 30 and re-signed to the practice squad. On October 24, 2022, he was released from the practice squad.

=== New Orleans Breakers ===
On January 28, 2023, Brailford signed with the New Orleans Breakers of the United States Football League (USFL). The Breakers folded when the XFL and USFL merged to create the United Football League (UFL).

=== Memphis Showboats ===
On January 5, 2024, Brailford was selected by the Memphis Showboats during the 2024 UFL dispersal draft. He was released on March 10, 2024.
