= 2024 UFL dispersal draft =

American football events to select players

General information
- Date: January 5–15, 2024
- Location: Social media

Overview
- League: United Football League

The 2024 UFL dispersal draft was the player selection process to fill the rosters of the eight teams for the 2024 UFL season and disperse the rosters from the eight teams from its component conferences, the XFL and USFL, that were not retained in the merger.

== Process ==
Following the merger of five teams of the XFL and three teams of the USFL into the United Football League (UFL) the UFL announced plans for a dispersal draft for XFL and USFL players on teams that were not joining the UFL. The draft will involve a three-phase player allocation process. Phases 1 and 2 occurred on January 5, and an open dispersal draft for remaining USFL/XFL players (phase 3) were held on January 15, 2024.

As part of the terms of the merger, the Houston Roughnecks used a base roster from their USFL counterpart, the Houston Gamblers, and drew from the USFL dispersal pool in Phase 2 of the draft. The 2023 Roughnecks' roster was dispersed to other teams in the XFL pool during Phase 2.

=== Phase 1 ===
In Phase 1, each of the eight remaining teams selected up to 42 players currently under contract, or (in the XFL's case) who had signed a letter of intent with that team, who will be exempt from Phase 3 of the draft.

=== Phase 2 ===
Phase 2 of the draft involved separate dispersal drafts for the USFL and XFL. The rosters of the four contracted teams from each league were placed into separate pools, where the four remaining teams from each league could claim up to 20 players from their league's respective pool.

=== Phase 3 ===
In Phase 3, billed as the UFL Super Draft, the remaining players not protected in Phase 1 nor claimed in Phase 2, along with any free agents who sign with the league, were subject to an open draft in which any of the eight teams could claim the player's rights.

== XFL dispersal draft ==
The following players were claimed by former XFL teams during Phase 2 of the dispersal draft:

=== Arlington Renegades ===
Player	Position	Previous team
Vic Beasley	LB	Vegas Vipers
Deontay Burnett	WR	Houston Roughnecks
Devin Darrington	RB	Orlando Guardians
Adrian Ealy	T	Seattle Sea Dragons
Morgan Ellison	RB	Seattle Sea Dragons
Seth Green	TE	Houston Roughnecks
Ajene Harris	DB	Houston Roughnecks
Marcus Minor	G	Houston Roughnecks
Christian Morgan	DB	Houston Roughnecks
Chris Owens	C	Seattle Sea Dragons
Roderick Perry	DT	Houston Roughnecks
Lindsey Scott	QB	Houston Roughnecks
LaRon Stokes	DT	Vegas Vipers

=== D.C. Defenders ===
Player	Position	Previous team
Deontay Anderson	DB	Vegas Vipers
Elijah Blades	DB	Houston Roughnecks
Jean Delance	T	Houston Roughnecks
Jordan Evans	LB	Seattle Sea Dragons
Deondre Francois	QB	Orlando Guardians
Trent Harris	LB	Houston Roughnecks
Donovan Jeter	DT	Houston Roughnecks
George Moore	T	Seattle Sea Dragons
Adam Sparks	DB	Vegas Vipers
Tariqious Tisdale	DE	Seattle Sea Dragons
Tim Ward	DE	Houston Roughnecks

=== San Antonio Brahmas ===
Player	Position	Previous team
Brycen Alleyne	RB	Houston Roughnecks
Dieuly Aristilde	WR	Houston Roughnecks
Tavante Beckett	LB	Houston Roughnecks
Omari Cobb	LB	Houston Roughnecks
Rashaad Coward	T	Houston Roughnecks
Jalen Dalton	DT	Seattle Sea Dragons
Austin Edwards	DT	Houston Roughnecks
Cody Latimer	TE	Orlando Guardians
Alex Mollette	C	Houston Roughnecks
Jordan Mosley	DB	Houston Roughnecks
Marvin Pierre	LB	Houston Roughnecks
Wyatt Ray	DE	Houston Roughnecks
Jaylen Samuels	RB	Houston Roughnecks
Justin Smith	WR	Houston Roughnecks
Teez Tabor	DB	Houston Roughnecks
Kevin Toliver	DB	Houston Roughnecks
Taron Vincent	DT	Houston Roughnecks
Kade Warner	WR	Houston Roughnecks
Nate Wieland	LB	Houston Roughnecks
Quincy Wilson	DB	Houston Roughnecks

=== St. Louis Battlehawks ===
Player	Position	Previous team
Anthony Cioffi	DB	Vegas Vipers
Qwynnterrio Cole	DB	Seattle Sea Dragons
Sage Doxtater	T	Houston Roughnecks
Antwuan Jackson	DT	Seattle Sea Dragons
Blake Jackson	WR	Seattle Sea Dragons
Keylon Kennedy	DB	Vegas Vipers
Chris Payton-Jones	DB	Seattle Sea Dragons
Jahcour Pearson	WR	Seattle Sea Dragons
Jack Snyder	G	Houston Roughnecks
Jazston Turnetine	T	Seattle Sea Dragons
Dohnovan West	C	Vegas Vipers
Mykael Wright	DB	Seattle Sea Dragons

== USFL Dispersal Draft ==
The following players were claimed by former USFL teams during Phase 2 of the dispersal draft:

=== Birmingham Stallions ===
Player	Position	Previous Team
Calvin Ashley	T	New Jersey Generals
Marcus Baugh	TE	New Orleans Breakers
Chris Blewitt	K	Pittsburgh Maulers
Cam Carter	T	New Jersey Generals
Daniel Isom	DB	Philadelphia Stars
Hercules Mata'afa	DE	New Jersey Generals
Chris Orr	LB	New Jersey Generals
Anree Saint-Amour	DE	New Orleans Breakers
Channing Stribling	DB	Philadelphia Stars
Eli Walker	DB	Pittsburgh Maulers
James Wiggins	DB	New Orleans Breakers

=== Houston Roughnecks ===
Player	Position	Previous Team
Paul Adams	T	New Orleans Breakers
Isaiah Battle	T	New Jersey Generals
Braedon Bowman	TE	New Jersey Generals
Woody Brandom	TE	New Jersey Generals
Reuben Foster	LB	Pittsburgh Maulers
Shamarious Gilmore	G	Philadelphia Stars
Cyril Grayson	WR	Philadelphia Stars
Isiah Hennie	WR	Pittsburgh Maulers
Reggie Howard Jr.	DT	New Orleans Breakers
Ryan Izzo	TE	Philadelphia Stars
Toby Johnson	DT	New Jersey Generals
Jack Kramer	C	New Orleans Breakers
Robert Myers	G	New Jersey Generals
Adam Rodriguez	DE	Philadelphia Stars
Olive Sagapolu	DT	New Jersey Generals
Keonte Schad	DT	New Orleans Breakers
Gabriel Sewell Jr.	LB	Philadelphia Stars
Marcus Tatum	T	New Orleans Breakers
Ethan Westbrooks	DE	New Jersey Generals
Bryson Young	LB	New Jersey Generals

=== Memphis Showboats ===
Player	Position	Previous Team
Jonathan Adams	WR	New Orleans Breakers
Dee Anderson	WR	New Orleans Breakers
Jordan Brailford	LB	New Orleans Breakers
Kennedy Brooks	RB	Philadelphia Stars
Connor Christian	DT	Pittsburgh Maulers
Case Cookus	QB	Philadelphia Stars
D.J. Daniel	DB	New Jersey Generals
Vontae Diggs	LB	New Orleans Breakers
Jarey Elder	DB	New Orleans Breakers
Kolin Hill	LB	New Jersey Generals
Kirk Kelley	G	New Orleans Breakers
Diondre Overton	WR	Pittsburgh Maulers
Vinny Papale	WR	New Orleans Breakers
Tery Poole	T	Pittsburgh Maulers
Tyshun Render	DE	New Jersey Generals
Shaheed Salmon	LB	New Orleans Breakers
Wes Saxton Jr.	TE	New Jersey Generals
Sage Surratt	TE	New Orleans Breakers
Darius Victor	RB	New Jersey Generals
Sidney Wells	T	New Orleans Breakers

=== Michigan Panthers ===
Player	Position	Previous Team
Adonis Alexander	DB	New Orleans Breakers
Jacob Burton	G	Philadelphia Stars
Davis Cheek	QB	New Orleans Breakers
Matthew Colburn II	RB	Philadelphia Stars
Corey Coleman	WR	Philadelphia Stars
Jerod Fernandez	LB	New Orleans Breakers
Keith Gipson Jr.	DB	Pittsburgh Maulers
Devin Gray	WR	Philadelphia Stars
Wes Hills	RB	New Orleans Breakers
Drew Himmelman	T	Philadelphia Stars
Shalom Luani	DB	New Jersey Generals
Brock Miller	P	New Jersey Generals
Jordan Ober	LS	New Jersey Generals
Nasir Player	DE	Pittsburgh Maulers
Ryan Pope	T	Philadelphia Stars
Jordan Suell	WR	Philadelphia Stars
Tristen Taylor	T	Philadelphia Stars
Alex Thomas	DB	New Orleans Breakers
Bryce Torneden	DB	Pittsburgh Maulers
Terry Wright	WR	Philadelphia Stars

== UFL Super Draft ==
Phase 3 of the dispersal draft, billed as the UFL Super Draft, occurred January 15, 2024, with results live-tweeted via Twitter.

Rnd.	Pick #	UFL team	Player	Pos.	Prev. team	Notes
1	1	San Antonio Brahmas	Quinten Dormady	QB	Orlando Guardians	
1	2	Memphis Showboats	Jared Thomas	C	New Orleans Breakers	
1	3	Houston Roughnecks	Ezra Gray	RB	Memphis Showboats	
1	4	St. Louis Battlehawks	Dravon Askew-Henry	S	New Jersey Generals	
1	5	Michigan Panthers	Nate Brooks	CB	Birmingham Stallions	
1	6	DC Defenders	Jalan McClendon	QB	Vegas Vipers	
1	7	Arlington Renegades	Jared Scott	TE	New Orleans Breakers	
1	8	Birmingham Stallions	Larnel Coleman	OL	Houston Roughnecks	
2	9	San Antonio Brahmas	Trey Botts	DT	Philadelphia Stars	
2	10	Memphis Showboats	Matthew White	P	New Orleans Breakers	
2	11	Houston Roughnecks	Glen Logan	DT	Houston Roughnecks	
2	12	St. Louis Battlehawks	Chris Garrett	OLB	Houston Gamblers	
2	13	Michigan Panthers	Will Adams	S	Vegas Vipers	
2	14	DC Defenders	Chris Rowland	WR	Philadelphia Stars	
2	15	Arlington Renegades	Calvin Jackson	WR	Seattle Sea Dragons	
2	16	Birmingham Stallions	Alijah Holder	S	Houston Gamblers	
3	17	San Antonio Brahmas	B.J. Wilson	T	Houston Roughnecks	
3	18	Memphis Showboats	Christian McFarland	S	Birmingham Stallions	
3	19	Houston Roughnecks	Luis Aguilar	K	Philadelphia Stars	
3	20	St. Louis Battlehawks	Kameron Kelly	S	San Antonio Brahmas	
3	21	Michigan Panthers	Eric Abojei	T	Michigan Panthers	
3	22	DC Defenders	T. J. Barnes	DT	Arlington Renegades	
3	23	Arlington Renegades	Nasir Greer	CB	Arlington Renegades	
3	24	Birmingham Stallions	Jalen Morton	QB	Birmingham Stallions	
4	25	San Antonio Brahmas	Chris Steele	DB	Houston Roughnecks	
4	26	Memphis Showboats	Max Roberts	OLB	Vegas Vipers	
4	27	Houston Roughnecks	Norman Price	T	San Antonio Brahmas	
4	28	St. Louis Battlehawks	John Daka	LB	Houston Roughnecks	
4	29	Michigan Panthers	Cole Murphy	K	Michigan Panthers	
4	30	DC Defenders	Chidi Okeke	T	San Antonio Brahmas	
4	31	Arlington Renegades	B. J. Bello	LB	Philadelphia Stars	
4	32	Birmingham Stallions	Terrell Bonds	CB	Pittsburgh Maulers	
5	33	San Antonio Brahmas	Dareuan Parker	T	Houston Roughnecks	
5	34	Memphis Showboats	Lee Morris	WR	Philadelphia Stars	
5	35	Houston Roughnecks	Logan Klusman	LS	Houston Gamblers	
5	36	St. Louis Battlehawks	Abdul Beecham	G	Orlando Guardians	
5	37	Michigan Panthers	Kyle Kramer	P	Michigan Panthers	
5	38	DC Defenders	Adonis Boone	T	DC Defenders	
5	39	Arlington Renegades	Juwan Manigo	LB	Arlington Renegades	
5	40	Birmingham Stallions	Ryan Langan	LS	Birmingham Stallions	
6	41	San Antonio Brahmas	K. D. Cannon	WR	Orlando Guardians	
6	42	Memphis Showboats	Salesi Uhatafe	T	New Orleans Breakers	
6	43	Houston Roughnecks	Gene Coleman	WR	Houston Gamblers	
6	44	St. Louis Battlehawks	Mandy Alonso	DT	St. Louis Battlehawks	
6	45	Michigan Panthers	Vantrell McMillan	DE	Michigan Panthers	
6	46	DC Defenders	Pooka Williams	RB	DC Defenders	
6	47	Arlington Renegades	No Selection Made			
6	48	Birmingham Stallions	Madre Harper	CB		
7	49	San Antonio Brahmas	Landen Akers	WR	San Antonio Brahmas	
7	50	Memphis Showboats	Will Likely	CB	Houston Gamblers	
7	51	Houston Roughnecks	No Selection Made			
7	52	St. Louis Battlehawks	Kahlil McKenzie	G	Vegas Vipers	
7	53	Michigan Panthers	No Selection Made			
7	54	DC Defenders	Nydair Rouse	CB	DC Defenders	
7	55	Arlington Renegades	No Selection Made			
7	56	Birmingham Stallions	Bo Scarbrough	RB	Birmingham Stallions	
8	57	San Antonio Brahmas	A. J. Hendy	S	Houston Roughnecks	
8	58	Memphis Showboats	Damion Willis	WR	Seattle Sea Dragons	
8	59	Houston Roughnecks	No Selection Made			
8	60	St. Louis Battlehawks	Christian Olmstead	G	St. Louis Battlehawks	
8	61	Michigan Panthers	No Selection Made			
8	62	DC Defenders	C. J. Johnson	WR	DC Defenders	
8	63	Arlington Renegades	No Selection Made			
8	64	Birmingham Stallions	Jahmir Ross-Johnson	T	Birmingham Stallions	
9	65	San Antonio Brahmas	John Yarbrough	T	Houston Roughnecks	
9	66	Memphis Showboats	Turner Bernard	LS	New Orleans Breakers	
9	67	Houston Roughnecks	No Selection Made			
9	68	St. Louis Battlehawks	No Selection Made			
9	69	Michigan Panthers	No Selection Made			
9	70	DC Defenders	Boogie Roberts	DT	Pittsburgh Maulers	
9	71	Arlington Renegades	No Selection Made			
9	72	Birmingham Stallions	Zaquandre White	RB	Birmingham Stallions	
10	73	San Antonio Brahmas	Cody Chrest	WR	Houston Roughnecks	
10	74	Memphis Showboats	Tye Smith	CB	Orlando Guardians	
10	75	Houston Roughnecks	No Selection Made			
10	76	St. Louis Battlehawks	No Selection Made			
10	77	Michigan Panthers	No Selection Made			
10	78	DC Defenders	Anthony Hines	LB	DC Defenders	
10	79	Arlington Renegades	No Selection Made			
10	80	Birmingham Stallions	Bobby Holly	FB	Birmingham Stallions	
11	81	San Antonio Brahmas	No Selection Made			
11	82	Memphis Showboats	Matthew Coghlin	K	New Orleans Breakers	
11	83	Houston Roughnecks	No Selection Made			
11	84	St. Louis Battlehawks	No Selection Made			
11	85	Michigan Panthers	No Selection Made			
11	86	DC Defenders	Tabyus Taylor	RB	DC Defenders	
11	87	Arlington Renegades	No Selection Made			
11	88	Birmingham Stallions	Myron Mitchell	WR	Birmingham Stallions	
12	89	San Antonio Brahmas	No Selection Made			
12	90	Memphis Showboats	Antoine Brooks	S	Seattle Sea Dragons	
12	91	Houston Roughnecks	No Selection Made			
12	92	St. Louis Battlehawks	No Selection Made			
12	93	Michigan Panthers	No Selection Made			
12	94	DC Defenders	Enrique Yenny	K	DC Defenders	
12	95	Arlington Renegades	No Selection Made			
12	96	Birmingham Stallions	No Selection Made			
13	97	San Antonio Brahmas	No Selection Made			
13	98	Memphis Showboats	Michael Stevens	CB	New Orleans Breakers	
13	99	Houston Roughnecks	No Selection Made			
13	100	St. Louis Battlehawks	No Selection Made			
13	101	Michigan Panthers	No Selection Made			
13	102	DC Defenders	No Selection Made			
13	103	Arlington Renegades	No Selection Made			
13	104	Birmingham Stallions	No Selection Made			
14	105	San Antonio Brahmas	No Selection Made			
14	106	Memphis Showboats	Willie Henry	DT	Birmingham Stallions	
14	107	Houston Roughnecks	No Selection Made			
14	108	St. Louis Battlehawks	No Selection Made			
14	109	Michigan Panthers	No Selection Made			
14	110	DC Defenders	No Selection Made			
14	111	Arlington Renegades	No Selection Made			
14	112	Birmingham Stallions	No Selection Made			
