= Abdul Beecham =

American football player (born 1997)

Profile
- Position: Offensive tackle

Personal information
- Born: May 5, 1997 (age 29); West Point, New York, U.S.
- Listed height: 6 ft 2 in (1.88 m)
- Listed weight: 317 lb (144 kg)

Career information
- High school: Judson (Converse, Texas)
- College: Blinn College (2015); Kansas State (2016–2018)
- NFL draft: 2019: undrafted

Career history
- Kansas City Chiefs (2019)*; Los Angeles Rams (2019)*; Pittsburgh Maulers (2022); Orlando Guardians (2023); St. Louis Battlehawks (2024–2025); Dallas Renegades (2026)*; St. Louis Battlehawks (2026)
- * Offseason or practice squad member only

Career UFL statistics
- Games played: 16
- Games started: 16

Abdul Beecham (born March 5, 1997) is an American professional football offensive lineman. He played college football at Blinn College before transferring to Kansas State. He has also played for the Kansas City Chiefs and Los Angeles Rams of the National Football League (NFL), Pittsburgh Maulers of the United States Football League (USFL), and Orlando Guardians of the XFL.

== College career ==
Beecham attended Blinn College in 2015 where he did not allow a single sack all season. He transferred to Kansas State in 2016 where he played 33 career games, starting 29 at guard from 2016 to 2018.

== Professional career ==
Pre-draft measurables
Height	Weight	Arm length	Hand span	Wingspan	40-yard dash	10-yard split	20-yard split	20-yard shuttle	Three-cone drill	Vertical jump	Broad jump	Bench press
6 ft 2 1/8 in (1.88 m)	321 lb (146 kg)	34 in (0.86 m)	10 in (0.25 m)	6 ft 8 5/8 in (2.05 m)	5.77 s	2.06 s	3.28 s	5.06 s	7.80 s	25.0 in (0.64 m)	8 ft 6 in (2.59 m)	15 reps
All values from Pro Day

=== Kansas City Chiefs ===
After going undrafted in the 2019 NFL draft, Beecham signed with the Kansas City Chiefs on June 15, 2019. He was released on August 20, 2019.

=== Los Angeles Rams ===
On August 28, 2019, Beecham signed with the Los Angeles Rams. He was released on August 31, 2019.

=== Pittsburgh Maulers ===
After a stint in The Spring League in 2020, Beecham was drafted by the Pittsburgh Maulers of the United States Football League (USFL) on March 11, 2022. His contract expired at the end of the season.

=== Orlando Guardians ===
On January 29, 2023, Beecham signed with the Orlando Guardians of the XFL. The Guardians folded when the XFL and USFL merged to create the United Football League (UFL).

=== St. Louis Battlehawks ===
On January 15, 2024, Beecham was selected by the St. Louis Battlehawks in the fifth round of the Super Draft portion of the 2024 UFL dispersal draft. He signed with the team on January 23. He re-signed with the team on August 6, 2024.

=== Dallas Renegades ===
On January 13, 2026, Beecham was selected by the Dallas Renegades in the 2026 UFL Draft. He was released on March 19.

=== St. Louis Battlehawks (second stint) ===
On May 5, 2026, Beecham re-signed with the St. Louis Battlehawks.

== Personal life ==
Beecham is the son of Samuel and Tina Beecham. He also has three siblings.
