= Wes Hills =

American football player (born 1995)

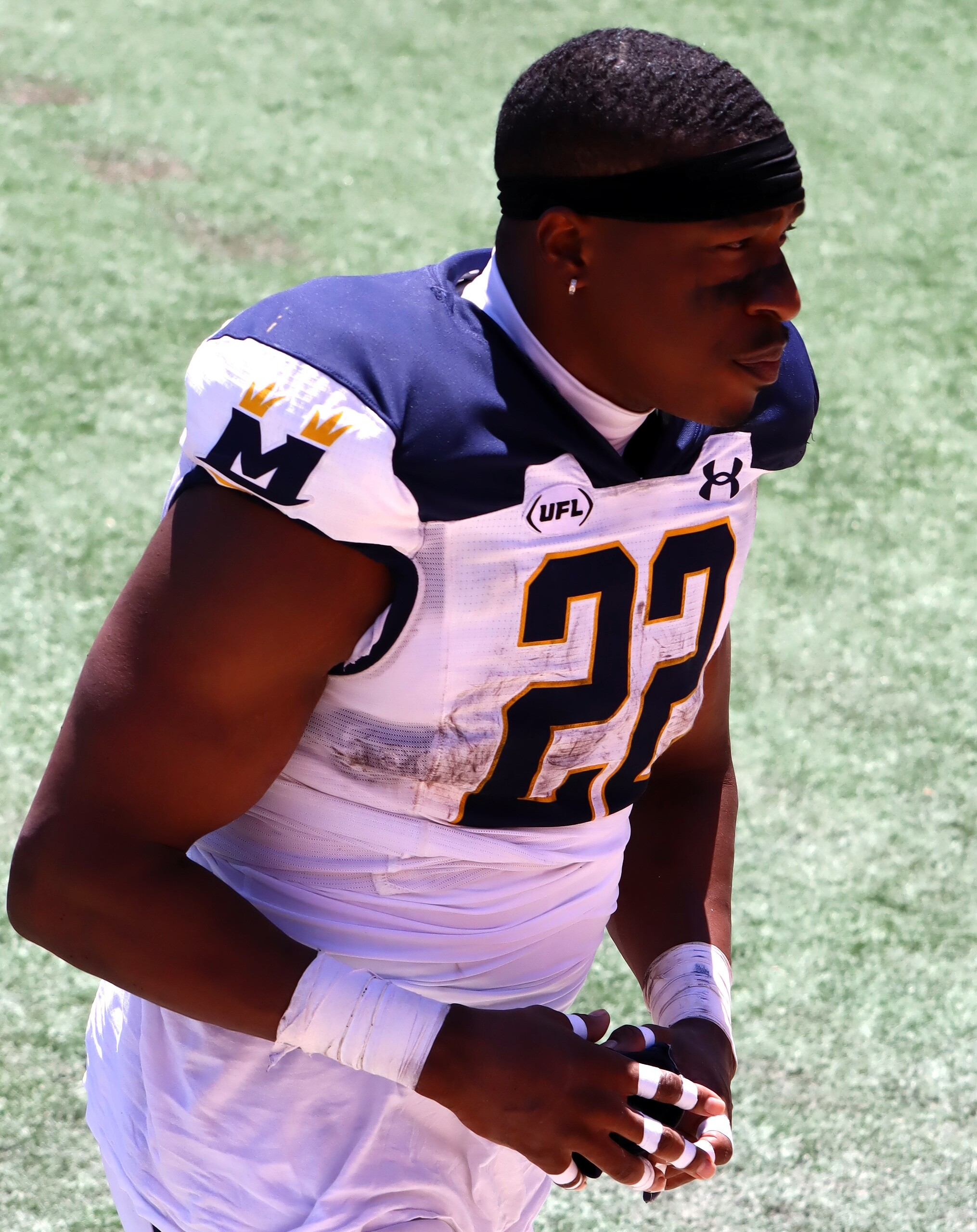
- Hills with the Memphis Showboats in 2025

Profile
- Position: Running back

Personal information
- Born: June 5, 1995 (age 31); Wildwood, New Jersey, U.S.
- Listed height: 6 ft 2 in (1.88 m)
- Listed weight: 218 lb (99 kg)

Career information
- High school: Wildwood
- College: Delaware (2013–2016); Slippery Rock (2018)
- NFL draft: 2019: undrafted

Career history
- Arizona Cardinals (2019)*; Detroit Lions (2019); Hamilton Tiger-Cats (2021–2022); New Orleans Breakers (2023); Michigan Panthers (2024); Memphis Showboats (2025)
- * Offseason or practice squad member only

Awards and highlights
- All-USFL Team (2023); USFL rushing yards leader (2023); Second-team Division II All-American (2018); First-team All-PSAC West (2018); Third-team All-CAA (2016)

Career NFL statistics
- Rushing yards: 21
- Rushing average: 2.1
- Rushing touchdowns: 2
- Receptions: 2
- Receiving yards: 1
- Stats at Pro Football Reference

Career CFL statistics
- Rushing yards: 404
- Rushing average: 5.5
- Rushing touchdowns: 1
- Receptions: 11
- Receiving yards: 105
- Stats at CFL.ca

Wesley Ed Hills (born June 5, 1995) is an American professional football running back. He played college football for Delaware and Slippery Rock. He signed with the Arizona Cardinals as an undrafted free agent in 2019 and played for the Detroit Lions of the National Football League (NFL), Hamilton Tiger-Cats of the Canadian Football League (CFL), New Orleans Breakers of the United States Football League (USFL), and Michigan Panthers of the UFL.

== Early life ==
Hills attended and played high school football at Wildwood High School.

== College career ==
=== Delaware ===
As a true freshman in 2013, Hills played in all 12 games for the Delaware Fightin' Blue Hens football team. He had 10 rushing attempts for 81 yards and a touchdown. He had 172 carries for 952 yards and six touchdowns, along with nine receptions for 53 yards in 2014. In the first game of the 2015 season, he had 16 carries for 88 yards before suffering a season-ending foot injury in the game.

In 2016, he played in seven games with five starts at running back and had 88 carries for 728 yards and seven touchdowns. In a game against Maine on October 8, he rushed for a career-high 242 yards and two touchdowns and was named Colonial Athletic Association Offensive Player of the Week for his efforts. He missed most of five games during the season with an injury. He earned third-team All-Colonial Athletic Association honors on November 22, 2016. Hills was declared academically ineligible for the 2017 season on August 2, 2017.

=== Slippery Rock ===
Hills transferred to Division II Slippery Rock on February 7, 2018, after his Division I eligibility expired. In 2018, he had 246 carries for 1,714 yards and had 28 receptions for 193 yards. His 1,714 rushing yards broke the single-season school record for rushing yards. Hills earned first-team All-Pennsylvania State Athletic Conference (PSAC) Western Division honors on November 14, 2018. He was named to the second-team Associated Press Division II All-American team on December 12, 2018.

In January 2019, Hills was selected to play in the NFLPA Collegiate Bowl, where after rushing for 78 yards and a touchdown, he was named game MVP. He was also selected to play in the 2019 Senior Bowl, where he had two carries for 22 yards in the game before leaving with an injury.

=== Statistics ===
Season	Team	Games		Rushing				Receiving			
Season	Team	GP	GS	Att	Yds	Avg	TD	Rec	Yds	Avg	TD
2013	Delaware	12	0	10	81	8.1	1	0	0	0.0	0
2014	Delaware	12	1	172	952	5.5	6	9	53	5.9	0
2015	Delaware	1	0	16	88	5.5	0	0	0	0.0	0
2016	Delaware	7	5	88	728	8.3	7	1	14	14.0	0
2017	Delaware	Ineligible to play									
2018	Slippery Rock	12	10	246	1,714	7.0	17	28	193	6.9	0
Career		44	16	532	3,563	6.7	31	38	260	6.8	0

== Professional career ==
Pre-draft measurables
Height	Weight	Arm length	Hand span
6 ft 0 5/8 in (1.84 m)	209 lb (95 kg)	32 3/8 in (0.82 m)	8 7/8 in (0.23 m)
All values from Pro Day

=== Arizona Cardinals ===
Hills signed a three-year, $1.75 million contract with the Arizona Cardinals as an undrafted free agent on May 10, 2019. He was waived with an injury settlement during final roster cuts on August 31, 2019.

=== Detroit Lions ===
On October 9, 2019, Hills was signed to the Detroit Lions' practice squad. He was released from the practice squad on October 19, but re-signed to the practice squad on October 23. He was promoted to the active roster on December 14, 2019. He scored his first two career touchdowns on one-yard runs in a 38–17 loss to the Tampa Bay Buccaneers on December 15, 2019. Hills was waived on August 17, 2020, but re-signed with the team three days later. He was waived on September 5, 2020.

=== Hamilton Tiger-Cats ===
Hills signed with the Hamilton Tiger-Cats of the CFL on March 12, 2021, and spent most of his first season in 2021 on the practice roster. He had 25 rushes for 132 yards in a week 18 game against the Saskatchewan Roughriders in October 2022, earning recognition from the league as a top performer for the week. He finished the 2022 season with 69 carries for 384 yards and one touchdown, with 11 catches for 105 yards. He became a free agent upon the expiry of his contract on February 14, 2023.

=== New Orleans Breakers ===
Hills signed with the New Orleans Breakers of the United States Football League on February 17, 2023. In week 3 of the 2023 USFL season, Hills set a league rushing record in a game with 191 yards. He was named Offensive Player of the Week for his performance by the league. He led the league in rushing in 2023 with 679 yards, and was named to the 2023 All-USFL team. The Breakers folded when the XFL and USFL merged to create the United Football League (UFL).

=== Michigan Panthers ===
On January 5, 2024, Hills was selected by the Michigan Panthers during the 2024 UFL dispersal draft. He was placed on injured reserve on May 20.

=== Memphis Showboats ===
On April 29, 2025, Hills signed with the Memphis Showboats. He was released on May 19.

== NFL career statistics ==
Legend
	Led the league
**Bold**	Career high

Year	Team	Games		Rushing					Receiving				
Year	Team	GP	GS	Att	Yds	Avg	Lng	TD	Rec	Yds	Avg	Lng	TD
2019	DET	1	1	10	21	2.1	15	2	2	1	0.5	2	0
Career		1	1	10	21	2.1	15	2	2	1	0.5	2	0

== CFL career statistics ==
=== Regular season ===
Year	Team	Games		Rushing					Receiving				
Year	Team	GP	GS	Att	Yds	Avg	Lng	TD	Rec	Yds	Avg	Lng	TD
2021	HAM	1	0	4	20	5.0	8	0	0	0	0.0	0	0
2022	HAM	6	6	69	384	5.6	22	1	11	105	9.6	26	0
Career		7	6	73	404	5.5	22	1	11	105	9.6	26	0

=== Postseason ===
Year	Team	Games		Rushing					Receiving				
Year	Team	GP	GS	Att	Yds	Avg	Lng	TD	Rec	Yds	Avg	Lng	TD
2021	HAM	DNP											
2022	HAM	1	1	5	34	6.8	22	0	1	5	5.0	5	0
Career		1	1	5	34	6.8	22	0	1	5	5.0	0	0

== USFL/UFL career statistics ==
=== Regular season ===
Year	Team	League	Games		Rushing					Receiving				
Year	Team	League	GP	GS	Att	Yds	Avg	Lng	TD	Rec	Yds	Avg	Lng	TD
2023	NO	USFL	**10**	**8**	**180**	**680**	3.8	**28**	**10**	**38**	**278**	7.3	**25**	0
2024	MICH	UFL	8	4	72	277	**3.9**	24	5	12	59	4.9	13	0
2025	MEM	UFL	1	0	13	47	3.6	9	0	3	28	**9.3**	13	0
Career			19	12	265	1,004	3.8	28	15	53	365	6.9	25	0

=== Postseason ===
Year	Team	League	Games		Rushing					Receiving				
Year	Team	League	GP	GS	Att	Yds	Avg	Lng	TD	Rec	Yds	Avg	Lng	TD
2023	NO	USFL	1	1	7	30	4.3	12	0	1	6	6.0	6	0
2024	MICH	UFL	Did not play due to injury											
Career			1	1	7	30	4.3	12	0	1	6	6.0	6	0
