= Jarrett Horst =

American football player (born 2000)

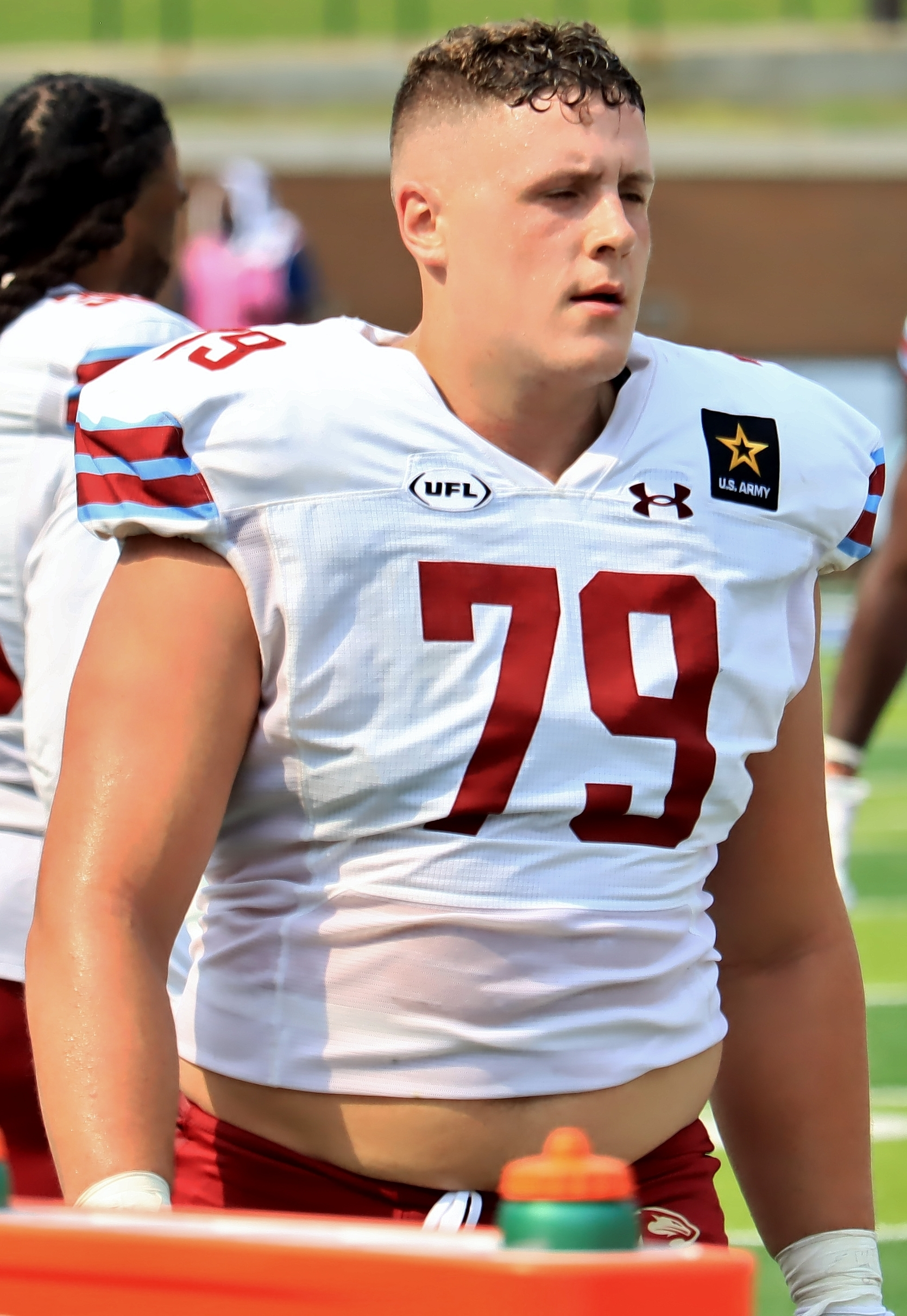
- Horst with the Michigan Panthers in 2024

No. 0 – Montreal Alouettes
- Position: Offensive tackle
- Roster status: Suspended
- CFL status: American

Personal information
- Born: February 7, 2000 (age 26)
- Listed height: 6 ft 6 in (1.98 m)
- Listed weight: 300 lb (136 kg)

Career information
- High school: Middleton (Middleton, Wisconsin)
- College: Ellsworth CC (2018); Arkansas State (2019–2020); Michigan State (2021–2022)
- NFL draft: 2023: undrafted

Career history
- Miami Dolphins (2023)*; Michigan Panthers (2024); Montreal Alouettes (2025–present)*
- * Offseason or practice squad member only

Awards and highlights
- Third-team All-Sun Belt (2019)
- Stats at CFL.ca

Jarrett Horst (born February 7, 2000) is an American professional football offensive tackle for the Montreal Alouettes of the Canadian Football League (CFL). He played college football at Ellsworth CC, Arkansas State, and Michigan State.

== Early life ==
Jarrett Horst was born on February 7, 2000. He played high school football at Middleton High School in Middleton, Wisconsin, and was a four-year letterman. He earned all-conference and all-area honors. Horst was selected to play in the Blue-Grey All-American Game.

== College career ==
Horst played his true freshman season of college football at Ellsworth Community College in 2018, appearing in three games.

Horst transferred to play for the Arkansas State Red Wolves of Arkansas State University in 2019. He started all 13 games at left tackle during the 2019 season and earned third-team All-Sun Belt Conference honors. He started the first seven games of the COVID-19 shortened 2020 season.

In 2021, Horst transferred to play for the Michigan State Spartans of Michigan State University. He started the first eight games of the 2021 season at left tackle before missing the rest of the year due to injury. He was named honorable mention All-Big Ten. Horst played in eight games, starting seven at left tackle, as a fifth-year senior in 2022. He was invited to the Hula Bowl all-star game after his senior year. He majored in communication at Michigan State.

== Professional career ==
Pre-draft measurables
Height	Weight	Arm length	Hand span	Wingspan	40-yard dash	10-yard split	20-yard split	20-yard shuttle	Three-cone drill	Vertical jump	Broad jump	Bench press
6 ft 5 1/2 in (1.97 m)	298 lb (135 kg)	33 1/4 in (0.84 m)	9 1/4 in (0.23 m)	6 ft 10 3/4 in (2.10 m)	5.33 s	1.87 s	2.95 s	4.75 s	7.95 s	28.0 in (0.71 m)	8 ft 9 in (2.67 m)	24 reps
All values from Pro Day

On February 21, 2023, Horst was selected by the Michigan Panthers with the first overall pick of the 2023 USFL draft. He went undrafted in the 2023 NFL draft, and signed with the Miami Dolphins on May 12, 2023. However, he was waived by the Dolphins three days later. On June 16, 2023, Horst was selected by the Orlando Guardians in the 2023 XFL rookie draft. He officially signed with the USFL's Panthers on September 6, 2023. He played in eight games, starting five at left tackle, for the Panthers during the 2024 UFL season. Horst also started for Michigan in the USFL Conference Championship, a 31–18 loss to the Birmingham Stallions. On August 12, 2024, he re-signed with the Panthers for the 2025 season. He was later released on February 28, 2025.

Horst signed a two-year contract with the Montreal Alouettes of the Canadian Football League on May 7, 2025. He was placed on the team's reserve/suspended list on May 12, 2025.
