= Ahmad Gooden =

American football player (born 1995)

No. 94, 99
- Position: Defensive end

Personal information
- Born: October 27, 1995 (age 31); Birmingham, Alabama, U.S.
- Listed height: 6 ft 2 in (1.88 m)
- Listed weight: 245 lb (111 kg)

Career information
- High school: Talladega (Talladega, Alabama)
- College: Samford
- NFL draft: 2019: undrafted

Career history
- Denver Broncos (2019); New York Jets (2019–2020)*; Buffalo Bills (2020)*; Houston Gamblers (2022); New Orleans Breakers (2023)*
- * Offseason or practice squad member only

Awards and highlights
- SoCon Defensive Player of the Year (2017); 2× First-team All-SoCon (2017, 2018)

Career NFL statistics
- Total tackles: 1
- Stats at Pro Football Reference

Ahmad Gooden (born October 27, 1995) is an American former professional football player who was a defensive end in the National Football League (NFL). He played college football for the Samford Bulldogs.

== College career ==
Gooden was a member of the Samford Bulldogs for four seasons. As a junior, Gooden made 101 tackles (15.5 for loss) with 5.5 sacks and was named first-team All-Southern Conference (SoCon) and the conference Defensive Player of the Year. Gooden was named first-team All-SoCon as a senior after recording 49 tackles, 15 tackles for loss and 5.5 sacks. He finished his collegiate career with 273 tackles, 22 sacks, five pass breakups, two forced fumbles and five fumble recoveries in 46 games played.

== Professional career ==
=== Denver Broncos ===
Gooden was signed by the Denver Broncos as an undrafted free agent on April 30, 2019. He was waived at the end of training camp during final roster cuts, but was re-signed to the team's practice squad on September 1, 2019. The Broncos promoted Gooden to the active roster on November 22, 2019. He made his NFL debut the next day against the Buffalo Bills. He was waived on December 14, 2019. Gooden played in three games with the Broncos, making one tackle and recording a quarterback hit.

=== New York Jets ===
On December 21, 2019, Gooden was signed to the New York Jets practice squad. He signed a reserve/future contract with the Jets on December 30, 2019. He was placed on the reserve/COVID-19 list by the Jets on July 29, 2020. He was activated from the list and subsequently waived on August 15, 2020.

=== Buffalo Bills ===
On October 22, 2020, Gooden was signed to the Buffalo Bills practice squad. He was released on November 2.

Gooden played with the Conquerors of The Spring League in 2021.

=== Houston Gamblers ===
Gooden was selected by the Houston Gamblers in the third round of the 2022 USFL draft. He was waived in February 2023.

=== New Orleans Breakers ===
The New Orleans Breakers claimed Gooden off waivers on February 3, 2023. He was released on April 10.
