= 2023 USFL draft =

American football events to select players

General information
- Date: February 21, 2023
- Time: 1:00 p.m.
- Location: Social media

Overview
- 80 total selections in 10 rounds
- League: United States Football League
- First selection: Jarrett Horst, OT, Michigan Panthers

The 2023 USFL draft, also known as the 2023 USFL college draft, was the second annual and final meeting of United States Football League (USFL) franchises to select newly eligible players. The draft consisted of 2023 draft eligible players.

== Selection order ==
The selection order for subsequent rounds followed the order of the first round. The first overall pick was decided by the winner of the Week 10 game between the 1–8 Pittsburgh Maulers and 1–8 Michigan Panthers, would win the first overall pick. The Panthers were victorious 33–21.

The New Jersey Generals had their 1st round selection moved to the last pick in the draft due to "a violation of offseason roster management rules".

Selection Number	Team	2022 record	Schedule strength	Playoff result
1	Michigan Panthers	2–8	.543	Did not qualify
2	Pittsburgh Maulers	1–9	.557	Did not qualify
3	Houston Gamblers	3–7	.529	Did not qualify
4	Memphis Showboats	4–6	.514	Did not qualify
5	New Orleans Breakers	6–4	.486	Div championship
6	New Jersey Generals	9–1	.443	Div championship
7	Philadelphia Stars	6–4	.486	Lost championship
8	Birmingham Stallions	9–1	.443	Won championship

== Player selections ==
The following is the breakdown of the 80 players selected by position:

- 10 offensive tackles
- 10 defensive ends
- 8 wide receivers
- 7 cornerbacks
- 6 linebackers
- 3 defensive tackles
- 3 safeties
- 3 tight ends
- 2 running backs
- 2 offensive guards
- 2 punters
- 1 kicker
- 1 long snapper

Positions key
Offense	Defense	Special teams
QB — Quarterback; RB — Running back; FB — Fullback; WR — Wide receiver; TE — Tight end; OL — Offensive lineman; T — Tackle; G — Guard; C — Center	DL — Defensive lineman; DE — Defensive end (Note: Sometimes referred to as an edge rusher (EDGE)); DT — Defensive tackle (Note: Includes nose tackle (NT)); LB — Linebacker (Note: Includes middle linebacker (MLB or MIKE), outside linebacker (OLB, WILL, SAM), and off-ball linebacker); DB — Defensive back; CB — Cornerback; S — Safety (Note: Includes free safety (FS) and strong safety (SS))	K — Kicker (Note: Also known as a placekicker (PK)); P — Punter; LS — Long snapper; RS — Return specialist (Note: Includes kickoff and punt returners)

Rnd	Pick No.	Team	Player	Pos.	College	Notes
1	1	Michigan Panthers	Jarrett Horst	OT	Michigan State	
1	2	Pittsburgh Maulers	Lindsey Scott Jr.	QB	Incarnate Word	
1	3	Houston Gamblers	Chase Brice	QB	Appalachian State	
1	4	Memphis Showboats	Mason Brooks	OT	Ole Miss	
1	5	New Orleans Breakers	Tyler Scott	WR	Cincinnati	
1	6	Philadelphia Stars	Alfred Edwards	OT	Utah State	
1	7	Birmingham Stallions	Kadeem Telfort	OT	UAB	
2	8	Michigan Panthers	Tanner Morgan	QB	Minnesota	
2	9	Pittsburgh Maulers	Malik Hamm	DE	Lafayette	
2	10	Houston Gamblers	Justin Ford	DE	Montana	
2	11	Memphis Showboats	Isaiah Bolden	CB	Jackson State	
2	12	New Orleans Breakers	Noah Taylor	LB	Virginia	
2	13	Philadelphia Stars	Anderson Hardy	OT	Appalachian State	
2	14	Birmingham Stallions	Quinton Barrow	OT	Grand Valley State	
2	15	New Jersey Generals	Adrian Martinez	QB	Kansas State	New Jersey draft positions penalized for violating offseason roster management rules.
3	16	Michigan Panthers	Santrell Latham	LB	Southern Miss	
3	17	Pittsburgh Maulers	Tre'Quan Dorsey	G	Saint Francis (PA)	
3	18	Houston Gamblers	Joey Fisher	G	Shepherd	
3	19	Memphis Showboats	Brevin Allen	DE	Campbell	
3	20	New Orleans Breakers	D. J. Ivey	CB	Miami (FL)	
3	21	Philadelphia Stars	Issac Moore	OT	Temple	
3	22	Birmingham Stallions	Malik Cunningham	QB	Louisville	
3	23	New Jersey Generals	J.J. Holloman	WR	Tennessee State	New Jersey draft positions penalized for violating offseason roster management rules.
4	24	Michigan Panthers	D.J. Scaife Jr.	G	Miami (FL)	
4	25	Pittsburgh Maulers	Ferlando Jordan	CB	Southeastern Louisiana	
4	26	Houston Gamblers	Scott Matlock	DT	Boise State	
4	27	Memphis Showboats	Benny Sapp III	SS	Northern Iowa	
4	28	New Orleans Breakers	Keaton Mitchell	RB	East Carolina	
4	29	Philadelphia Stars	Truman Jones	DE	Harvard	
4	30	Birmingham Stallions	Derius Davis	WR	TCU	
4	31	New Jersey Generals	Victor Jones	DT	Akron	New Jersey draft positions penalized for violating offseason roster management rules.
5	32	Michigan Panthers	DaShaun White	LB	Oklahoma	
5	33	Pittsburgh Maulers	Isaiah Land	DE	Florida A&M	
5	34	Houston Gamblers	Jeffery Johnson	DT	Oklahoma	
5	35	Memphis Showboats	Michael Ezeike	TE	UCLA	
5	36	New Orleans Breakers	Isaiah Moore	LB	NC State	
5	37	Philadelphia Stars	Earl Bostick Jr.	OT	Kansas	
5	38	Birmingham Stallions	Zeke Vandenburgh	DE	Illinois State	
5	39	New Jersey Generals	De'Jahn Warren	CB	Jackson State	New Jersey draft positions penalized for violating offseason roster management rules.
6	40	Michigan Panthers	Levi Bell	DE	Texas State	
6	41	Pittsburgh Maulers	Nash Jensen	OL	North Dakota State	
6	42	Houston Gamblers	Keenan Issac	DB	Alabama State	
6	43	Memphis Showboats	Jerome Carvin	DL	Tennessee	
6	44	New Orleans Breakers	Dante Stills	DL	West Virginia	
6	45	New Jersey Generals	Derrick Tucker	S	Texas Southern	
6	46	Philadelphia Stars	Jose Ramirez	DE	Eastern Michigan	
6	47	Birmingham Stallions	Colby Sorsdal	OT	William & Mary	
7	48	Michigan Panthers	Gunnar Oakes	TE	Eastern Michigan	
7	49	Pittsburgh Maulers	Taylor Grimes	WR	Incarnate Word	
7	50	Houston Gamblers	Alex Jensen	OT	South Dakota	
7	51	Memphis Showboats	Nehemiah Shelton	CB	San Jose State	
7	52	New Orleans Breakers	Darius Hagans	CB	Virginia State	
7	53	New Jersey Generals	Jermaine McDaniel Jr.	DE	North Carolina A&T	
7	54	Philadelphia Stars	Demontrey Jacobs	DT	South Florida	
7	55	Birmingham Stallions	Grant DuBose	WR	Charlotte	
8	56	Michigan Panthers	Andrew Farmer II	DE	Lane	
8	57	Pittsburgh Maulers	C.J. Turner	WR	Southeastern Louisiana	
8	58	Houston Gamblers	Brady Russell	TE	Colorado	
8	59	Memphis Showboats	Trea Shropshire	WR	UAB	
8	60	New Orleans Breakers	Jake Bobo	WR	UCLA	
8	61	New Jersey Generals	Adam Korsak	P	Rutgers	
8	62	Philadelphia Stars	Trey Botts	DL	CSU Pueblo	
8	63	Birmingham Stallions	Mark Evans II	OG	Arkansas Pine-Bluff	
9	64	Michigan Panthers	Chim Okorafor	DL	Benedictine	
9	65	Pittsburgh Maulers	Jacob Slade	DL	Michigan State	
9	66	Houston Gamblers	Jason Taylor II	S	Oklahoma State	
9	67	Memphis Showboats	Silas Dzansi	OL	Virginia Tech	
9	68	New Orleans Breakers	Alex Palczewski	OL	Illinois	
9	69	New Jersey Generals	Jalen Holston	RB	Virginia Tech	
9	70	Philadelphia Stars	Destin Mack	CB	The Citadel	
9	71	Birmingham Stallions	B. J. Thompson	DE	Stephen F. Austin	
10	72	Michigan Panthers	Sidy Sow	OL	Eastern Michigan	
10	73	Pittsburgh Maulers	Ethan Evans	P	Wingate	
10	74	Houston Gamblers	Colby Reeder	LB	Iowa State	
10	75	Memphis Showboats	Antonio Fletcher	S	Southern Illinois	
10	76	New Orleans Breakers	Tyler Baker-Williams	CB	NC State	
10	77	New Jersey Generals	Nick Zecchino	LS	Purdue	
10	78	Philadelphia Stars	Dre Terry	LB	Alabama A&M	
10	79	Birmingham Stallions	Starling Thomas	DB	UAB	
10	80	New Jersey Generals	Ray Estes	DB	Grambling State	The Generals had their first round pick moved to the end of the 10th round due to a violation in offseason rules.
