= Shaheed Salmon =

American gridiron football player (born 1996)

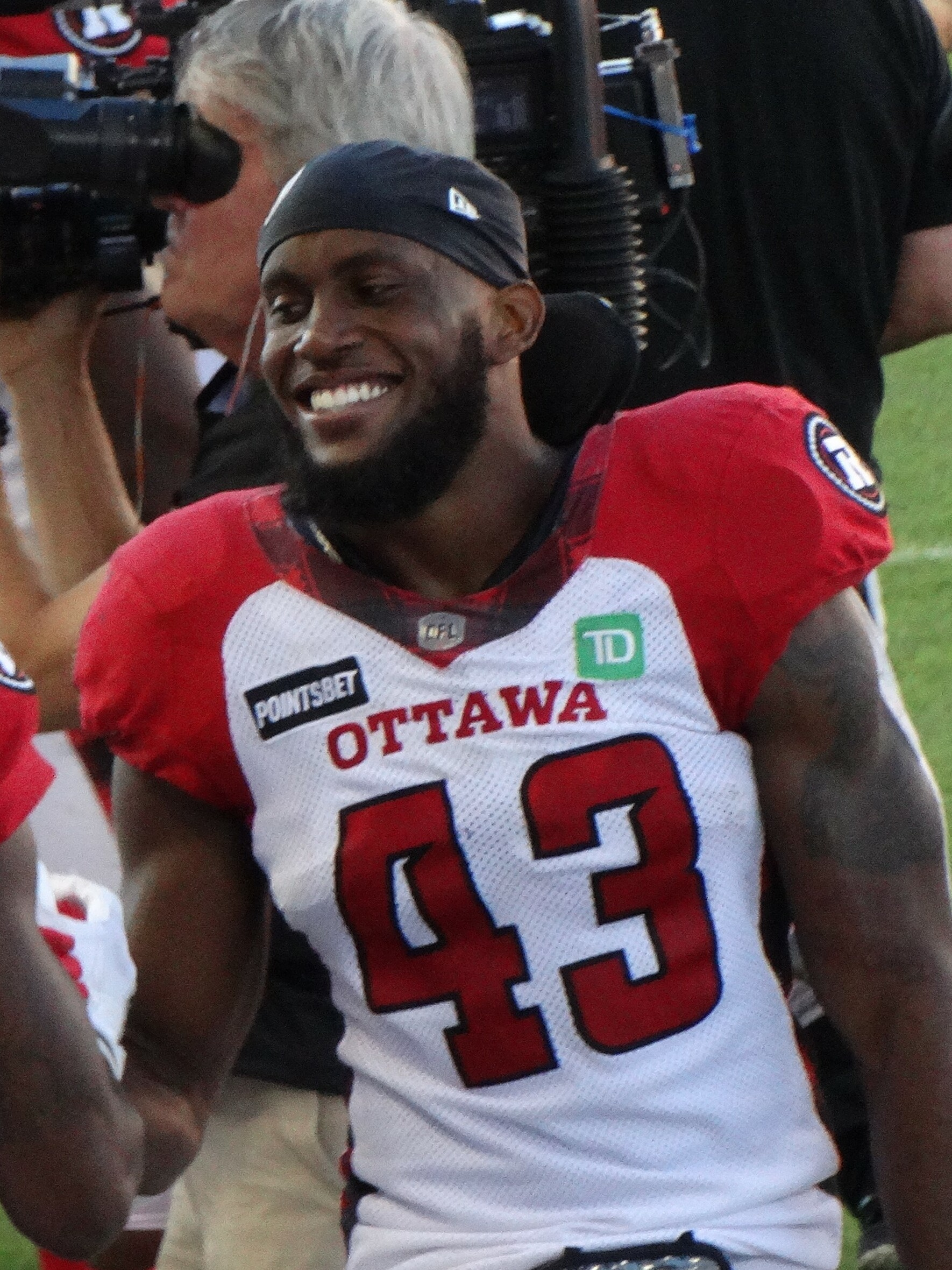
- Salmon with the Redblacks in 2022

Calgary Stampeders
- Position: Linebacker
- Roster status: Active
- CFL status: American

Personal information
- Born: April 22, 1996 (age 30); Tampa, Florida, U.S.
- Listed height: 6 ft 1 in (1.85 m)
- Listed weight: 224 lb (102 kg)

Career information
- High school: Land o' Lakes High
- College: Samford
- NFL draft: 2018: undrafted

Career history
- Tampa Bay Buccaneers (2018)*; Birmingham Iron (2019); Ottawa Redblacks (2019–2022); New Orleans Breakers (2023); Memphis Showboats (2024)*; Calgary Stampeders (2024–present)*
- * Offseason or practice squad member only
- Stats at CFL.ca

Shaheed Salmon (born April 22, 1996) is a professional gridiron football linebacker for the Calgary Stampeders of the Canadian Football League (CFL). After playing college football for Samford, he signed with the Tampa Bay Buccaneers of the National Football League (NFL) as an undrafted free agent in 2018. He played for the Birmingham Iron of the Alliance of American Football (AAF) and Ottawa Redblacks of the Canadian Football League (CFL).

== College career ==
Salmon played college football for the Samford Bulldogs from 2014 to 2017.

== Professional career ==
=== Tampa Bay Buccaneers ===
Salmon signed as an undrafted free agent with the Tampa Bay Buccaneers on May 17, 2018. He played in one pre-season game before being released on August 20.

=== Birmingham Iron ===
Salmon played for the Birmingham Iron during their 2019 season where he played in eight games and had 14.5 tackles and one forced fumble. His contract was terminated when the league folded during the season.

=== Ottawa Redblacks ===
On May 19, 2019, Salmon signed with the Ottawa Redblacks. He initially retired during training camp in June, but returned on July 30. Salmon played in his first CFL game on August 9, against the Edmonton Eskimos where he had one special teams tackle. He played in five regular season games in 2019 where he had three defensive tackles, four special teams tackles, and one forced fumble. He did not play in 2020 due to the cancellation of the 2020 CFL season.

In 2021, he began the season on the team's practice roster for the first two games, but played in the remaining 12 regular season games where he had one defensive tackle, eight special teams tackles, and one forced fumble. Following training camp in 2022, he made the team's active roster and played in his first season opener. He recorded his first career interception on August 5, 2022, against the Calgary Stampeders when he picked off Bo Levi Mitchell and returned the ball 30 yards. Salmon was released on January 10, 2023.

=== New Orleans Breakers ===
Salmon signed with the New Orleans Breakers of the USFL on February 3, 2023. The Breakers folded when the XFL and USFL merged to create the United Football League (UFL).

=== Memphis Showboats ===
Salmon was selected by the Memphis Showboats during the 2024 UFL dispersal draft on January 5, 2024. He was waived by the Showboats on March 23.

=== Calgary Stampeders ===
On March 26, 2024, Salmon signed with the Calgary Stampeders of the Canadian Football League (CFL).

== Personal life ==
Salmon was born to parents Lorna Holden and Dunston Salmon.
