= Davis Cheek =

American football player (born 1999)

No. 4, 17
- Position: Quarterback

Personal information
- Born: February 26, 1999 (age 27); Matthews, North Carolina, U.S.
- Listed height: 6 ft 3 in (1.91 m)
- Listed weight: 217 lb (98 kg)

Career information
- High school: David W. Butler (Matthews)
- College: Elon (2017–2021)
- NFL draft: 2022: undrafted

Career history
- Carolina Panthers (2022)*; New Orleans Breakers (2023); Michigan Panthers (2024)*
- * Offseason or practice squad member only

Awards and highlights
- CAA Football Offensive Rookie of the Year (2017); CAA Football's Scholar-Athlete of the Year (2020); Second-team All-CAA (2021)
- Stats at Pro Football Reference

Davis Cheek (born February 26, 1999) is an American former professional football quarterback. He was a member of the Carolina Panthers of the National Football League (NFL), New Orleans Breakers of the United States Football League (USFL), and Michigan Panthers of the United Football League (UFL). He played college football at Elon.

Cheek is the Elon's second all-time leader in career passing yards (8,548), attempts (1,149), completions (701), touchdown passes (51), and first all-time leader in career completion percentage (66.8%).

== Early life ==
Cheek was born on February 26, 1999. He was raised in Matthews, North Carolina, and attended David W. Butler High School.

As a junior, Cheek led Butler High to a 9–2 (5–1 in conference) record and a playoff berth while throwing for 2,108 yards and 16 touchdowns, he was named as an all-conference selection. The team lost to Mallard Creek High School 35–30 in the second round of the playoffs.

As a senior, Cheek led Butler to an improved 10–1 (6–0 in conference) record, scoring 40+ points in seven out of eleven games that year. After beginning the playoffs with a home 63–0 win against McDowell High School, Cheek beat Mallard Creek 42–28 after they had beaten Butler earlier in the season. Cheek and Butler's season ended against Julius L. Chambers High School in a 50–49 loss. Cheek rushed for one touchdown and threw for another five, one of which came in overtime to give Butler a 49–42 lead. Chambers scored in response and got the two-point conversion for the win.

== College career ==
Cheek played for Elon University (FCS) for five years from 2017 to 2021. During that time, he threw for 8,548 yards passing and 51 touchdowns.

In 2017, Cheek started in all twelve games for Elon, making his debut against Toledo. He earned CAA Football Rookie of the Week and STATS FCS National Freshman of the Week honors after a win over Rhode Island where he threw for 331 yards and three touchdowns. He finished the year being named CAA Football Offensive Rookie of the Year and was a finalist for the Jerry Rice Award after he led Elon to an 8–4 record.

In 2018, Cheek started the first six games of the season before tearing his ACL in a game against Delaware. He led the team to a 4–1 record before his injury, including a season-high 286 yards and a game-winning touchdown against No. 2 James Madison in a 27–24 Elon win. Prior to the season Cheek was named to the CFPA FCS National Player of the Year Watch List.

In 2019, Cheek started all eleven games for Elon, leading the team to a 5–6 record. On homecoming night Cheek and Elon played against Williams & Mary that ended in a 31–29 William & Mary victory after five overtime periods, Cheek threw for 247 yards and two touchdowns in the losing effort including a game tying touchdown pass in fifth overtime. He finished the year eighth in the CAA for total offense with 194.8 yards per game and seventh in passing yards per game with 197.7.

Prior to the 2020 season, Cheek suffered a season-ending injury prior to the team's spring season. Despite being out, Cheek was still selected as CAA Football's Scholar-Athlete of the Year.

In 2021, Cheek started all eleven games in his return from injury, having the best year of his career statistically he led Elon to a 6–5 record including wins over ranked No. 22 Richmond and No. 25 Rhode Island. Cheek opened the season throwing for 312 yards and two touchdown passes in a losing effort against Wofford. After a win against New Hampshire where Cheek threw 328 yards and two touchdowns, he was named National Offensive Player of the Week. He was named as a finalist for the Walter Payton Award.

=== Statistics ===
| Year | Team | Games | Passing | | | | | | | | Rushing | | | |
| Year | Team | GP | Comp | Att | Pct | Yards | Avg | TD | Int | Rate | Att | Yards | Avg | TD |
|---|---|---|---|---|---|---|---|---|---|---|---|---|---|---|
| 2017 | Elon | 12 | 190 | 323 | 58.8 | 2,431 | 7.5 | 15 | 8 | 132.42 | 67 | 85 | 1.3 | 2 |
| 2018 | Elon | 6 | 79 | 120 | 65.8 | 1,018 | 8.5 | 4 | 2 | 144.8 | 16 | −20 | −1.3 | 1 |
| 2019 | Elon | 11 | 179 | 309 | 57.9 | 2,175 | 7.0 | 15 | 6 | 129.2 | 70 | −32 | −0.5 | 0 |
| 2020 | Elon | DNP | | | | | | | | | | | | |
| 2021 | Elon | 11 | 253 | 396 | 63.9 | 2,926 | 7.4 | 17 | 5 | 137.5 | 71 | 113 | 1.6 | 3 |
| Career | | 40 | 701 | 1,149 | 61.0 | 8,548 | 7.4 | 51 | 21 | 135.98 | 224 | 147 | 0.7 | 6 |

== Professional career ==
Pre-draft measurables
| Height | Weight | Arm length | Hand span | 40-yard dash | 10-yard split | 20-yard split | 20-yard shuttle | Three-cone drill | Vertical jump | Broad jump |
|---|---|---|---|---|---|---|---|---|---|---|
| 6 ft 1 7/8 in (1.88 m) | 216 lb (98 kg) | 31 7/8 in (0.81 m) | 9 3/4 in (0.25 m) | 4.88 s | 1.71 s | 2.78 s | 4.39 s | 7.35 s | 33 in (0.84 m) | 9 ft 7 in (2.92 m) |
All values from Elon pro-day.

=== Carolina Panthers ===
After going undrafted in the 2022 NFL draft, Cheek was signed by the Carolina Panthers as an undrafted free agent on April 30, 2022. He was waived by the team on July 12, 2022. On October 3, 2022, Cheek entered the first session of the 2022 NFL Alumni Academy.

On October 8, 2022, Cheek signed a contract with the XFL for the upcoming 2023 XFL season.

On December 6, 2022, Cheek re-signed with the Carolina Panthers' practice squad.

=== New Orleans Breakers ===
On January 14, 2023, Cheek signed with the New Orleans Breakers of the United States Football League (USFL). The Breakers folded when the XFL and USFL merged to create the United Football League (UFL).

=== Michigan Panthers ===
On January 5, 2024, Cheek was selected by the Michigan Panthers during the 2024 UFL dispersal draft. He was placed on the retired list on March 18, 2024.

== Personal life ==
Cheek is the son of Eric Cheek and Monica Steed. He married Haley Bookholdt on June 7, 2025. Together the couple own "Bunker Athletic Club".
