= Adonis Alexander =

American football player (born 1996)

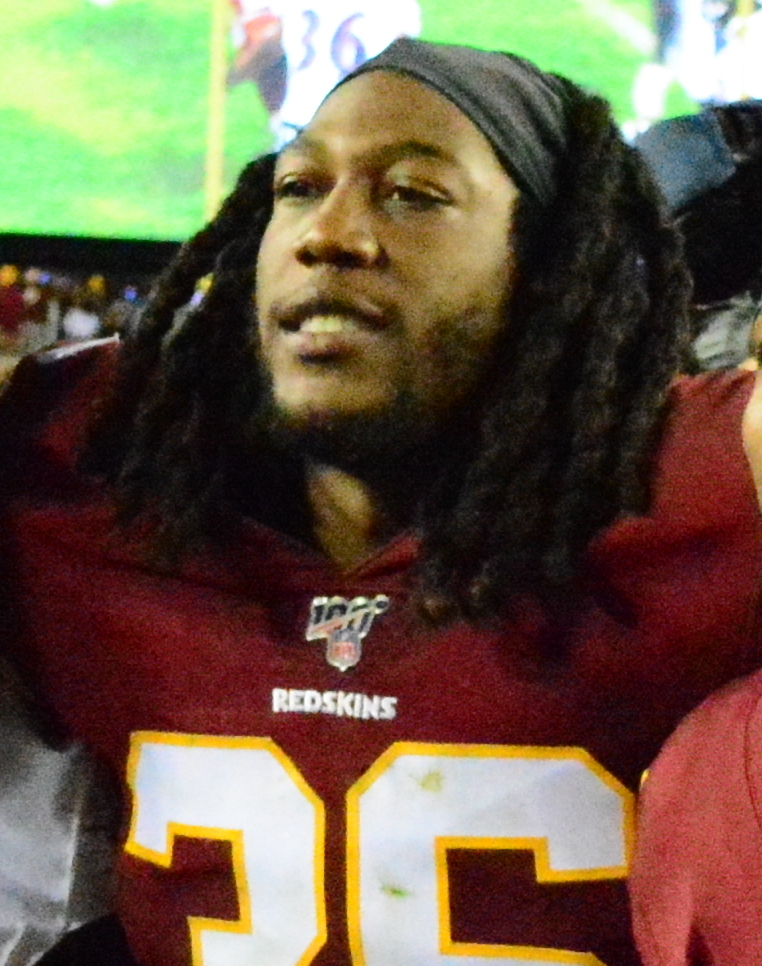
- Alexander with the Washington Redskins in 2019

No. 36 – St. Louis Battlehawks
- Position: Cornerback
- Roster status: Active

Personal information
- Born: November 7, 1996 (age 29); Charlotte, North Carolina, U.S.
- Listed height: 6 ft 3 in (1.91 m)
- Listed weight: 190 lb (86 kg)

Career information
- High school: Independence (Charlotte)
- College: Virginia Tech (2015–2017)
- Supplemental draft: 2018: 6th round

Career history
- Washington Redskins (2018–2019); Los Angeles Rams (2019–2020)*; San Francisco 49ers (2021)*; New Orleans Saints (2021)*; New Orleans Breakers (2022–2023); Michigan Panthers (2024–2025); BC Lions (2026)*; St. Louis Battlehawks (2026–present)
- * Offseason or practice squad member only

Career NFL statistics
- Total tackles: 4
- Stats at Pro Football Reference

Adonis K. Alexander (born November 7, 1996) is an American professional football cornerback for the St. Louis Battlehawks of the United Football League (UFL). He played college football for the Virginia Tech Hokies and was selected by the Washington Redskins in the sixth round of the 2018 NFL supplemental draft.

== Early life and college ==
Alexander attended Independence High School in Charlotte, North Carolina. He then attended Virginia Tech, and was ruled academically ineligible for his final year, preventing him from entering the 2018 NFL draft. However, he entered in to the 2018 NFL supplemental draft.

== Professional career ==
=== Washington Redskins ===
Alexander was selected by the Washington Redskins in the sixth round of the 2018 supplemental draft.

Alexander was waived by Washington on August 31, 2019, but was re-signed to the practice squad the following day. He was released on October 1.

=== Los Angeles Rams ===
On November 14, 2019, Alexander was signed to the Los Angeles Rams' practice squad. He signed a reserve/future contract with the Rams on December 31.

Alexander was waived on September 4, 2020.

=== San Francisco 49ers ===
On January 4, 2021, Alexander signed a reserve/future contract with the San Francisco 49ers. Alexander was waived San Francisco on May 4.

=== New Orleans Saints ===
On August 4, 2021, Alexander signed with the New Orleans Saints. He was waived/injured and placed on injured reserve on August 18. Alexander was waived New Orleans on August 21.

=== New Orleans Breakers ===
Alexander was selected in the 8th round of the 2022 USFL draft by the New Orleans Breakers. He was transferred to the inactive roster on April 22, 2022. He was transferred to the active roster on April 30.

Alexander re-signed with the Breakers on October 3, 2023. The Breakers folded when the XFL and USFL merged to create the United Football League (UFL).

=== Michigan Panthers ===
On January 5, 2024, Alexander was selected by the Michigan Panthers during the 2024 UFL dispersal draft. He re-signed with the team on August 19, 2024.

=== BC Lions ===
On November 5, 2025, Alexander signed a futures contract as a defensive back with the BC Lions of the Canadian Football League (CFL). On May 12, 2026, Alexander was released by the Lions, as part of their final round of preseason roster cuts.

=== St. Louis Battlehawks ===
On June 1, 2026, Alexander signed with the St. Louis Battlehawks of the United Football League (UFL).
