= 2023 Michigan Panthers season =

American professional football season

- Owner: National Spring Football League Enterprises Co, LLC, (Fox Sports)
- General manager: Steve Kazor
- Head coach: Mike Nolan
- Home stadium: Ford Field

Results
- Record: 4–6
- Division place: 2nd in North Division
- Playoffs: Lost Division Finals (at Maulers) 27–31 (OT)

The 2023 season was the Michigan Panthers second season in the United States Football League (USFL), their first playing at Ford Field and their first under head coach/general manager tandem of Mike Nolan and Steve Kazor. They improved upon their 2–8 record from the previous season and reached the playoffs where they lost to the Pittsburgh Maulers in the USFL North Division Championship Game in overtime.

== Offseason ==
=== Stadium plans ===
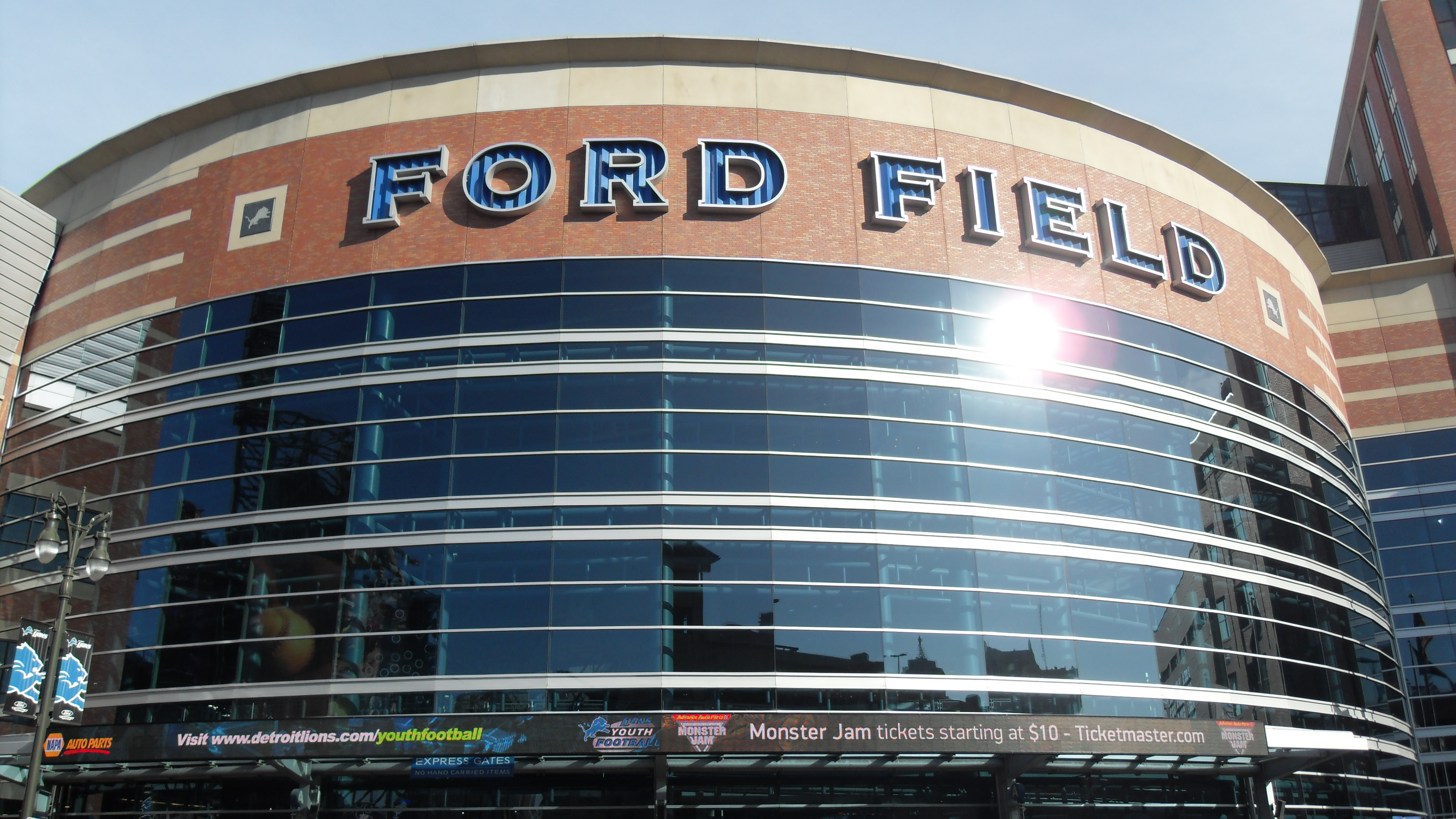
Ford Field, the stadium for the Michigan Panthers, pictured in 2010.

During the 2022 season, the Panthers, and every team in the USFL, played in Birmingham, Alabama. Before the end of that season, the USFL announced plans to move into two or four hubs for teams to play in. In November, the USFL were reportedly exploring options of having a hub in Metro Detroit, with possible locations being the Eastern Michigan Eagles' Rynearson Stadium and the Detroit Lions' Ford Field. On January 26, the USFL chose Ford Field, with Rynearson Stadium to serve as their practice field. The previous iteration of the Michigan Panthers had them playing in the Pontiac Silverdome, which was also home to the Detroit Lions.

=== Draft ===
Prior to the draft order being complete, the Panthers played the Pittsburgh Maulers in the last week of the 2022 season. Both teams came into the game with a league worst 1–8 record. The USFL announced that the winner of the game would hold the first overall pick in the next years' draft, incentivizing the teams to win the game instead of tanking. The Panthers came out victorious 33–21.

The draft only included players that were 2023 draft eligible, contrasting with the 2022 draft, which was to build rosters. Also differing from the 2022 draft, players were not initially contracted with the USFL prior to the draft, meaning teams have to negotiate with players to retain their rights. No player signed with the team until April 12 when the Panthers signed their third-round draft pick, Santrell Latham.

With the first overall pick, the Panthers chose Jarrett Horst out of Michigan State. Horst already declared for the NFL draft in December 2022.

2023 Michigan Panthers Draft
Round	Pick	Player	Position	Notes
1	1	Jarrett Horst	Offensive tackle	
2	8	Tanner Morgan	Quarterback	Signed by an NFL team as an UDFA.
3	16	Santrell Latham	Linebacker	
4	24	DJ Scaife Jr.	Offensive lineman	
5	32	DaShaun White	Linebacker	
6	40	Levi Bell	Defensive end	
7	48	Gunnar Oakes	Tight end	
8	56	Andrew Farmer II	Defensive end	
9	64	Chim Okorafor	Guard	
10	72	Sidy Sow	Offensive tackle	Drafted in the 2023 NFL draft

=== Additions ===
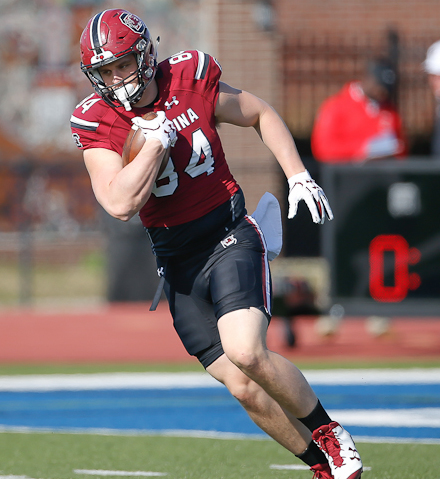
The Panthers signed Kyle Markway, who won a Super Bowl with the Los Angeles Rams in Super Bowl LVI.

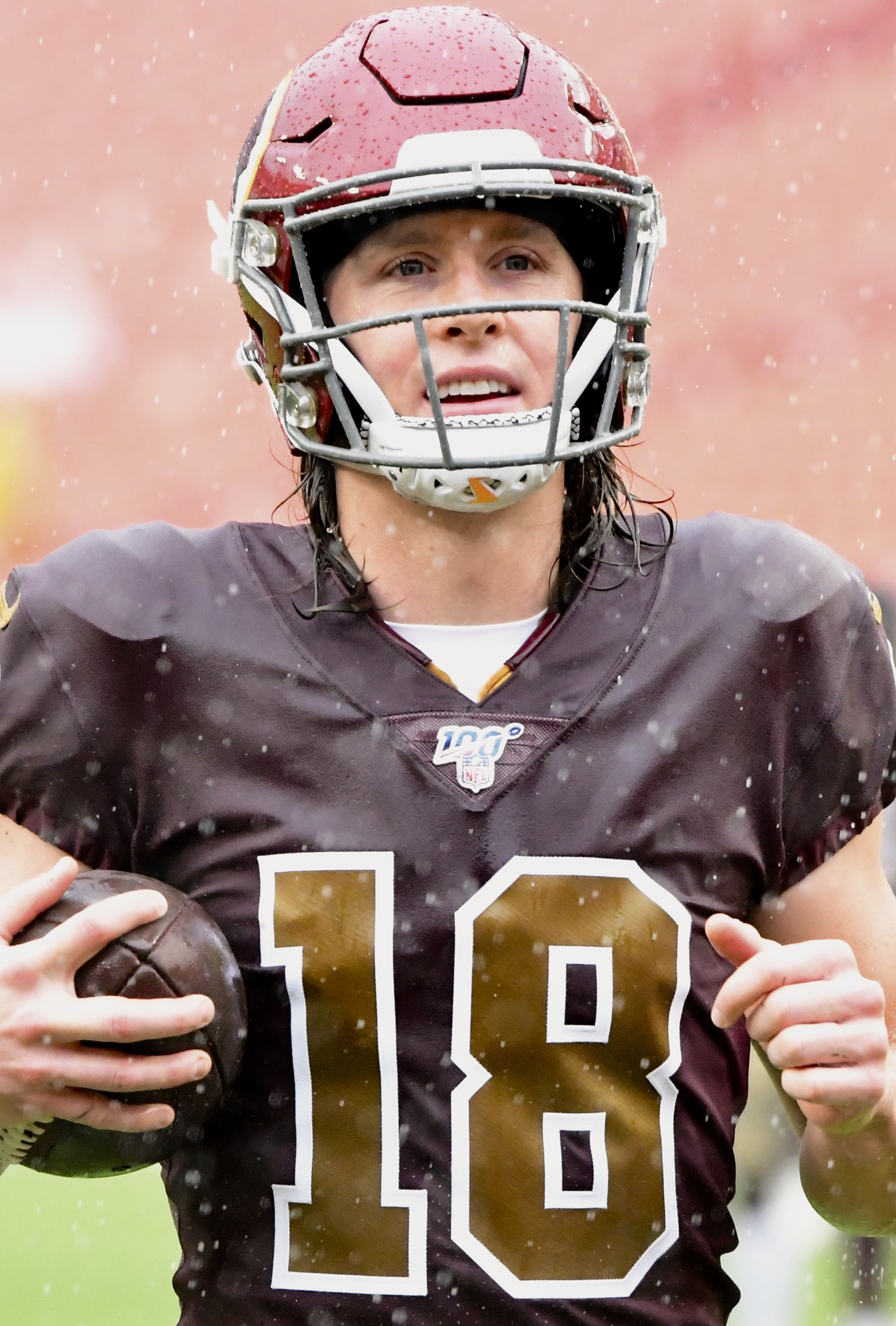
The Panthers signed Trey Quinn, who was the Mr. Irrelevant in the 2018 NFL draft.

Position	Player	Date
DB	Kiante Hardin	July 26
DB	Keandre Evans	July 26
WR	La'Darius McElroy	July 26
RB	La'Darren Brown	July 26
S	Warren Saba	August 22
ILB	Paddy Fisher	August 22
OLB	Charles Williams	August 22
OT	Ka'John Armstrong	August 22
OL	Gene Pryor	August 22
WR	Isaiah McKoy	September 17
WR	Whop Philyor	September 26
DT	Jamal Milan	October 5
OC	Noah Johnson	October 5
DT	Garrett Marino	October 6
TE	Cole Hikutini	October 7
WR	A. J. Richardson	October 22
OC	Api Mane	November 17
OT	Corey Hoelck	November 22
OLB	Leon Jacobs	December 13
WR	Myron Mitchell	December 13
OT	Ryan Nelson	December 13
TE	Kyle Markway	December 15
DE	Breeland Speaks	December 22
OT	Denzel Okafor	December 23
RB	Stevie Scott III	December 23
RB	Josh Adams	December 28
WR	Talolo Limu-Jones	December 30
WR	Trey Quinn	December 31
CB	Levonta Taylor	January 5
RB	Reggie Corbin	January 11
DT	Robert Nkemdiche	January 11
WR	Ishmael Hyman	January 19
S	Lano Hill	February 17
LB	Treshaun Hayward	March 6
LB	Noah Dawkins	March 14
QB	Carson Strong	March 19
CB	Josh Butler	March 22
DE	Ron'Dell Carter	March 22
WR	Devin Ross	March 28

=== Subtractions ===
Position	Player	Date
WR	Myron Mitchell	December 15
OT	Syrus Tuitele	December 30
CB	Joseph Putu	January 2
S	Kieron Williams	January 2
CB	Dominique Martin	January 2
DE	Adewale Adeoye	January 2
RB	Josh Adams	March 15
ILB	Alexander Vainikolo	March 27
WR	Isaiah McKoy	March 28

== Final roster ==
2023 Michigan Panthers final roster
Quarterbacks: 19 Brian Lewerke; 12 Josh Love; 13 E. J. Perry; Running backs: 3 Reggie Corbin; 2 Stevie Scott; 27 Toa Taua; Wide receivers: 86 Kaden Davis; 4 D. J. Montgomery; 18 Trey Quinn; 20 A. J. Richardson; 9 Marcus Simms; 8 Joe Walker; Tight ends: 82 Josh Babicz; 85 Marcus Baugh; 80 Cole Hikutini; 88 Kyle Markway	Offensive linemen: 56 Eric Abojei T; 64 Joshua Dunlop T; 79 Brodarious Hamm T; 61 Noah Johnson C; 75 Ryan Nelson G; 76 Sean Pollard G; 51 Gene Pryor G; 65 James Walker T; 77 Keith Williams T; Defensive linemen: 32 Levi Bell DT; 95 Garrett Marino DT; 42 Vantrel McMillan DE; 94 Jamal Milan DT; 99 Walter Palmore DT; 57 Breeland Speaks DE; 90 Ethan Westbrooks DE	Linebackers: 10 Noah Dawkins; 40 Paddy Fisher; 5 Frank Ginda; 33 Tyree Johnson; 44 Terry Myrick; 30 DaShaun White; Defensive backs: 7 Corrion Ballard S; 23 Josh Butler CB; 25 Keandre Evans CB; 11 Devin Hafford CB; 29 Sean Mahone S; 21 Kai Nacua S; 22 Tyree Robinson S; 17 Warren Saba S; 1 Levonta Taylor CB; Special teams: 52 Shane Griffin LS; 15 Kyle Kramer P; 16 Cole Murphy K	Reserve lists: -- Jalin Burrell CB (DNR); 97 Ron'Dell Carter DE (IR); 24 Kiante Hardin CB (IR); -- Leon Jacobs OLB (DNR); 70 Denzel Okafor T (IR); 22 Cory Rahman S (IR); 35 Devin Ross WR (IR); 11 Carson Strong QB (IR); 50 active, 8 inactive

== Staff ==
On February 3, 2023, head coach Jeff Fisher stepped down to "spend more time with family". The Panthers named Mike Nolan as head coach.

2023 Michigan Panthers staff
Front office: General manager – Steve Kazor; Head coaches: Head coach – Mike Nolan; Offensive coaches: Offensive coordinator/Quarterbacks – Eric Marty; Offensive line – Tim Holt; Running backs – Jordan Pavlisin; Special teams coordinator/Wide receivers – Jaron Fairman; Tight ends – Gary Watkins	Defensive coaches: Defensive coordinator/Defensive backs – Steve Brown; Defensive line – Collin Bauer; Linebackers – Christian Runza

== Schedule ==
=== Regular season ===
Week	Date	Time (ET)	Opponent	Result	Record	TV	Venue	Recap
1	April 16	12:00 p.m.	at Houston Gamblers	**W** 29–13	1–0	NBC	Simmons Bank Liberty Stadium	Recap
2	April 23	7:00 p.m.	at **Philadelphia Stars**	**W** 24–10	2–0	FS1	Tom Benson Hall of Fame Stadium	Recap
3	April 30	4:00 p.m.	vs. **New Jersey Generals**	**L** 13–28	2–1	Fox	Ford Field	Recap
4	May 6	7:30 p.m.	vs. Memphis Showboats	**L** 10–29	2–2	NBC	Ford Field	Recap
5	May 13	12:30 p.m.	vs. **Pittsburgh Maulers**	**L** 7–23	2–3	USA	Ford Field	Recap
6	May 20	4:00 p.m.	vs. Birmingham Stallions	**L** 13–27	2–4	Fox	Ford Field	Recap
7	May 28	5:30 p.m.	at **New Jersey Generals**	**W** 25–22	3–4	FS1	Tom Benson Hall of Fame Stadium	Recap
8	June 4	4:00 p.m.	at New Orleans Breakers	**L** 20–24	3–5	Fox	Protective Stadium	Recap
9	June 10	12:00 p.m.	at **Pittsburgh Maulers**	**L** 7–19	3–6	Fox	Tom Benson Hall of Fame Stadium	Recap
10	June 18	7:00 p.m.	vs. **Philadelphia Stars**	**W** 23–20	4–6	Fox	Ford Field	Recap

Bold indicates divisional opponent.

=== Game summaries ===
==== Week 1: at Houston Gamblers ====
Week 1: Michigan Panthers at Houston Gamblers – Game summary

Quarter	1	2	3	4	Total
**Panthers**	6	3	7	13	**29**
Gamblers	6	7	0	0	**13**

at Simmons Bank Liberty Stadium

- Date: April 16
- Game time: 12:00 p.m. EST
- Referee: Derek Anderson
- TV announcers (NBC): Jac Collinsworth (play-by-play), Jason Garrett (analyst), and Corey Robinson (sideline reporter)

Game information

**First quarter**

- MICH – Marcus Baugh 22-yard pass from Josh Love (Cole Murphy kick no good), 7:55. Panthers 6–0 **Drive: 7 plays, 81 yards, 3:19.**
- HOU – T.J. Pledger 2-yard run (Nick Vogel kick no good), 0:41. Tied 6–6 **Drive: 12 plays, 60 yards, 7:11.**

**Second quarter**

- MICH – Cole Murphy 35-yard field goal, 12:31. Panthers 9–6 **Drive: 7 plays, 42 yards, 2:51.**
- HOU – T.J. Pledger 2-yard run (Nick Vogel kick good), 8:56. Gamblers 13–9 **Drive: 3 plays, 17 yards, 1:32.**

**Third quarter**

- MICH – Stevie Scott 1-yard run (Cole Murphy kick good), 10:28. Panthers 16–13 **Drive 2 plays, 2 yards, 1:11.**

**Fourth quarter**

- MICH – Trey Quinn 24-yard pass from Josh Love (Cole Murphy kick no good), 8:46. Panthers 22–13 **Drive: 10 plays, 70 yards, 6:03.**
- MICH – Joe Walker 34-yard pass from Josh Love (Cole Murphy kick good), 1:44. Panthers 29–13 **Drive: 7 plays, 82 yards, 3:05.**

**Top passers**

- MICH – Josh Love – 18/20, 215 yards, 3 TD
- HOU – Kenji Bahar – 13/22, 109 yards, 2 INT

**Top rushers**

- MICH – Stevie Scott – 12 rushes, 61 yards, 1 TD
- HOU – T.J. Pledger – 16 rushes, 41 yards, 2 TD

**Top receivers**

- MICH – Joe Walker – 6 receptions, 105 yards, 1 TD
- HOU – Josh Pederson – 2 receptions, 23 yards

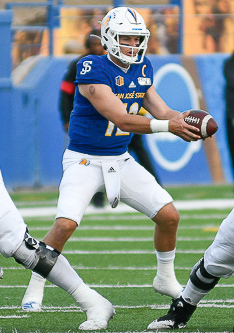
Panthers quarterback, Josh Love, set a USFL record for completion percentage with 90.0%.

The Panthers traveled to the Houston Gamblers for their season opener. The Panthers began the scoring with a Marcus Baugh 22-yard reception from Josh Love. The Gamblers responded with a long drive capped off with a 2-yard rushing touchdown from T.J. Pledger to tie the game at 6–6. The Panthers extended their lead with a 35-yard field goal from Cole Murphy before the Gamblers answered with a T.J. Pledger 2-yard rushing touchdown on the back of a muffed punt by the Panthers, closing out the first half with Houston up 13–9.

The second half began with a Panthers punt before Panthers cornerback William Saba intercepted Kenji Bahar to set the Panthers up 2-yards to score, which they capitalized off of with a Stevie Scott 2-yard run to put them in lead 16–13. The third quarter ended with a Houston fumble and a Michigan punt. In the fourth quarter, the Panthers drove the ball down the field, ending with a Trey Quinn 24-yard reception to put the Panthers ahead by 22–13. With Panthers defensive end Breeland Speaks forcing a fumble in the redzone, the Panthers quickly drove 82 yards down the field to score on a Joe Walker 34-yard reception to extend the Panthers' lead to 29–13, which would be the final score.

Panthers quarterback, Josh Love, set a USFL record for highest completion percentage in a game, with 90.0%. The Panthers defense forced four turnovers while defensive end Breeland Speaks produced three sacks and seven combined tackles along with the forced fumble. Both Love and Speaks received player of the week for their respective side of the ball.

==== Week 2: at Philadelphia Stars ====
Week 2: Michigan Panthers at Philadelphia Stars – Game summary

Quarter	1	2	3	4	Total
**Panthers**	0	10	7	7	**24**
Stars	3	0	7	0	**10**

at Tom Benson Hall of Fame Stadium

- Date: April 23
- Game time: 7:00 p.m. EST
- Referee: Stuart Mullins
- TV announcers (FS1): Kevin Kugler (play-by-play), Joel Klatt (analyst), and Devin Gardner (sideline reporter)

Game information

**First quarter**

- PHI – Luis Aguilar 27-yard field goal, 11:13. Stars 3–0 **Drive: 7 plays, 58 yards, 3:50.**

**Second quarter**

- MICH – Cole Hikutini 36-yard pass from Josh Love (Cole Murphy kick good), 13:07. Panthers 7–3 **Drive: 3 plays, 64 yards, 1:08.**
- MICH – Cole Murphy 39-yard field goal, 0:01. Panthers 10–3 **Drive: 4 plays, 6 yards, 0:55.**

**Third quarter**

- PHI – Matt Colburn 1-yard rush (Luis Aguilar kick good), 7:39. Tied 10–10 **Drive: 6 plays, 43 yards, 3:18.**
- MICH – Reggie Corbin 2-yard rush (Cole Murphy kick good), 0:59. Panthers 17–10 **Drive: 10 plays, 66 yards, 6:47.**

**Fourth quarter**

- MICH – Reggie Corbin 52-yard rush (Cole Murphy kick good), 6:35. Panthers 24–10 **Drive: 4 plays, 66 yards, 5:20.**

**Top passers**

- MICH – Josh Love – 15/30, 174 yards, TD, 2 INT
- PHI – Case Cookus – 29/45, 280 yards, 2 INT

**Top rushers**

- MICH – Reggie Corbin – 11 rushes, 131 yards, 2 TD
- PHI – Matt Colburn – 9 rushes, 23 yards, TD

**Top receivers**

- MICH – Cole Hikutini – 3 receptions, 56 yards, TD
- PHI – Devin Gray – 8 receptions, 64 yards

Reggie Corbin during a phone call to his coaches

Hey! Tell him give me the ball and let me kill 'em. No, I'm serious. Alright, come on, let's go, let's–let's put 'em down! We playin' with them, let's go.

— Reggie Corbin, Fox Sports

In Week 2, the Panthers visited the Philadelphia Stars. The Stars kicked off the scoring with a Luis Aguilar 27-yard field goal to put the Stars up 3–0. The Panthers failed to answer on their first drive, driving down field for Cole Murphy to attempt a 47-yard field goal, but the ball hit the left upright and failed to cross. After trading punts, Stars kicker Aguilar attempted a 46-yard field goal, but it too failed to cross between the uprights. After getting the ball back, the Panthers quickly drove 64 yards down the field to score on a Josh Love 36-yard pass to tight end Cole Hikutini to go up 7–3. The teams went scoreless through 4 drives, which includes both the teams throwing interceptions and punting, before the Stars got the ball back with 1:56 remaining in the second quarter. However, with 1:01 left, Stars quarterback Case Cookus threw an interception, setting the Panthers up at Philadelphia's 27 yard line. They failed to convert, leading to a Cole Murphy 36-yard field goal to put the Panthers up 10–3 at halftime.

After the Panthers got the ball back to start the second half, quarterback Josh Love threw an interception. The Stars capitalized by driving down and scoring a touchdown with a Matt Colburn 1-yard rush to tie up the game 10–10. The Panthers responded by moving down the field and scoring on a 2-yard rush by Reggie Corbin to go up 17–10. After getting the ball back, the Stars produced a lurching drive that lasted a little over 14 minutes and took 12 plays. On a 4th & 1 at the Michigan 34, the Stars failed to convert after a dropped pass. The Panthers capitalized with a 52-yard rushing touchdown by Corbin on the third play of the ensuing drive, stretching their lead to 24–10, which would be the final score.

Panthers running back, Reggie Corbin, earning an Offensive Player of the Week nomination by rushing for 131 yards and two touchdown on 11 receptions. Along with Corbin, punter Kyle Kramer also earned a Special Teams Player of the Week nomination, going 3/3 on extra points and 1/2 on field goals.

==== Week 3: vs. New Jersey Generals ====
Week 3: New Jersey Generals at Michigan Panthers – Game summary

Quarter	1	2	3	4	Total
**Generals**	14	7	0	7	**28**
Panthers	3	7	3	0	**13**

at Ford Field

- Date: April 30
- Game time: 4:00 p.m. EST
- Referee: James Carter
- TV announcers (FOX): Curt Menefee, Joel Klatt and Devin Gardner

Game information

**First quarter**

- MICH – Cole Murphy 45-yard field goal, 11:54. Panthers 3–0 **Drive: 6 plays, 30 yards, 3:10.**
- NJ – Darius Victor 51-yard pass from De'Andre Johnson (Nick Sciba kick good), 9:09. Generals 7–3 **Drive: 4 plays, 64 yards, 2:41.**
- NJ – De'Andre Johnson 9-yard rush (Nick Sciba kick good), 6:08. Generals 14–3 **Drive: 2 plays, 80 yards, 0:56.**

**Second quarter**

- NJ – Darius Victor 35-yard rush (Nick Sciba kick good), 14:51. Generals 21–3 **Drive: 9 plays, 81 yards, 4:45.**
- MICH – Trey Quinn 28-yard pass from Carson Strong (Cole Murphy kick good), 4:44. Generals 21–10 **Drive: 9 plays, 81 yards, 5:22.**

**Third quarter**

- MICH – Cole Murphy 31-yard field goal, 4:16. Generals 21–13 **Drive: 16 plays, 61 yards, 9:13.**

**Fourth quarter**

- NJ – D. J. Alonzo 72-yard pass from De'Andre Johnson (Nick Sciba kick good), 12:12. Generals 28–13 **Drive: 1 play, 72 yards, 0:11.**

**Top passers**

- NJ – De'Andre Johnson – 10/15, 180 yards, 2 TD
- MICH – Josh Love – 15/31, 101 yards, INT

**Top rushers**

- NJ – De'Andre Johnson – 10 rushes, 98 yards, TD
- MICH – Stevie Scott – 12 rushes, 63 yards

**Top receivers**

- NJ – Alonzo Moore – 1 reception, 72 yards, TD
- MICH – Trey Quinn – 5 receptions, 61 yards, TD

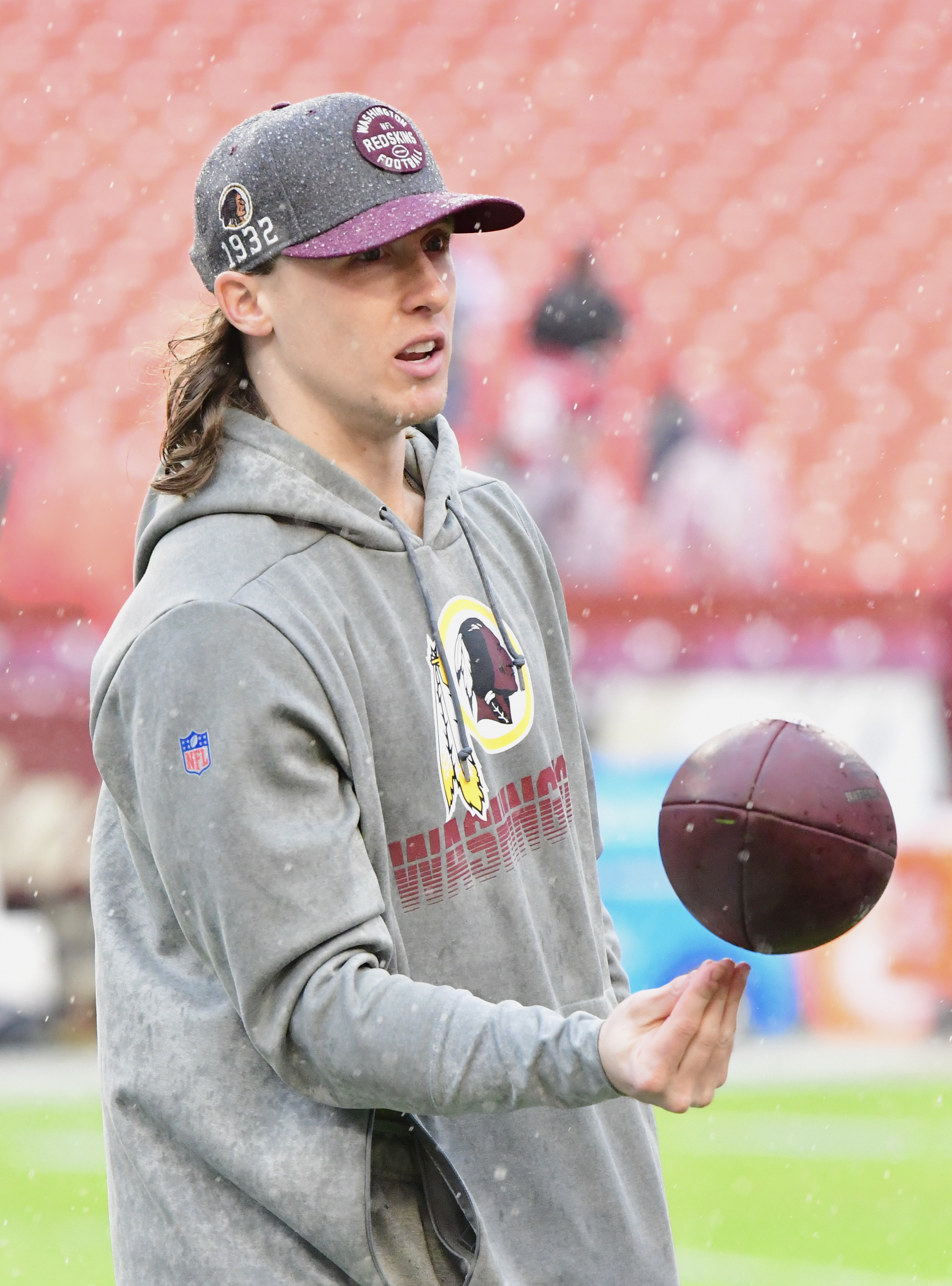
Wide receiver Trey Quinn led the Panthers in receiving, catching 5 passes for 61 yards and a touchdown.

In Week 3, the Panthers hosted their home opener against New Jersey Generals. To open the scoring, the Panthers drove 30 yards for Cole Murphy to kick a 45-yard field goal, which he made to put the Panthers up 3–0. The Generals responded with a 4 play drive that ended with a 51-yard pass from De'Andre Johnson to Darius Victor, which put the General ahead 7–3. The Panthers punted on their next possession, and the Generals wasted no time, with quarterback Johnson rushing 71 yards to set up the 9-yard rushing touchdown from Johnson to extend the Generals lead to 14–3. After another Panthers punt, the Generals orchestrated a 9 play, 81-yard drive ending in a 35-yard rushing touchdown from Victor on 4th & 1 to put the Generals up 21–3 going into the second quarter. After the Panthers turned the ball over on downs and the Generals punted, the Panthers orchestrated their own 9 play, 81-yard drive ending with a 28-yard pass from Carson Strong to wide receiver Trey Quinn to put the Panthers in a 10–21 deficit to end the first half.

To begin the second half, the Generals got the ball. However, the Panthers defense held them to a three-and-out and they punted. With the ball, the Panthers orchestrated a lurching 16 play, 61-yard drive that lasted a little over 9 minutes. The drive ended with a Cole Murphy 31-yard field goal to shorten the deficit to 13–21. After getting the ball back, the Generals struggled to earn a first down. On the third play of the drive, quarterback Johnson stepped up, but fumbled the ball for Walter Palmore to recover, the first turnover of the game. However, on the Panthers' ensuing drive, quarterback Josh Love threw an interception to D. J. Daniel. On the first play of the Generals' drive, Alonzo Moore caught a pass from De'Andre Johnson, taking it 72 yards to score, putting the Generals up 28–13, which would be the final score.

The Panthers defense let up 28 points, more than the first 2 weeks combined, while recording only one sack. Quarterback Josh Love also played poorly, throwing 48.4% completion percentage and one interception, culminating in a 42.5 passer rating. Also, despite passing the ball 31 times, he only threw for 101 yards.

==== Week 4: vs. Memphis Showboats ====
Week 4: Memphis Showboats at Michigan Panthers – Game summary

Quarter	1	2	3	4	Total
**Showboats**	6	7	3	13	**29**
Panthers	0	3	0	7	**10**

at Ford Field

- Date: May 6
- Game time: 7:30 p.m. EST
- Referee: Larry Smith
- TV announcers (NBC): Jac Collinsworth (play-by-play), Jason Garrett (analyst), and Zora Stephenson (sideline reporter)

Game information

**First quarter**

- MEM – Alex Kessman 54-yard field goal, 13:03. Showboats 3–0 **Drive: 4 plays, -4 yards, 2:03.**
- MEM – Alex Kessman 53-yard field goal, 3:52. Showboats 6–0 **Drive: 6 plays, 28 yards, 2:50.**

**Second quarter**

- MEM – Cole Kelley 1-yard rush (Alex Kessman kick good), 11:24. Showboats 13–0 **Drive: 8 plays, 68 yards, 4:07.**
- MICH – Cole Murphy 24-yard field goal, 2:51. Showboats 13–3 **Drive: 14 plays, 59 yards, 7:54.**

**Third quarter**

- MEM – Alex Kessman 37-yard field goal, 5:53. Showboats 16–3 **Drive: 10 plays, 53 yards, 5:57.**

**Fourth quarter**

- MICH – Joe Walker 3-yard pass from Josh Love (Cole Murphy kick good), 12:51. Showboats 16–10 **Drive: 14 plays, 64 yards, 7:51.**
- MEM – Cole Kelley 1-yard rush (Alex Kessman kick good), 5:08. Showboats 23–10 **Drive: 12 plays, 58 yards, 7:21.**
- MEM – Jeff McCulloch fumble recovery (Alex Kessman kick no good), 3:37. Showboats 29–10

**Top passers**

- MEM – Cole Kelley – 15/26, 151 yards
- MICH – Carson Strong – 9/12, 76 yards, INT

**Top rushers**

- MEM – Kerrith Whyte – 15 rushes, 54 yards
- MICH – Stevie Scott – 12 rushes, 66 yards

**Top receivers**

- MEM – Vinny Papale – 3 receptions, 58 yards
- MICH – Joe Walker – 7 receptions, 76 yards, TD

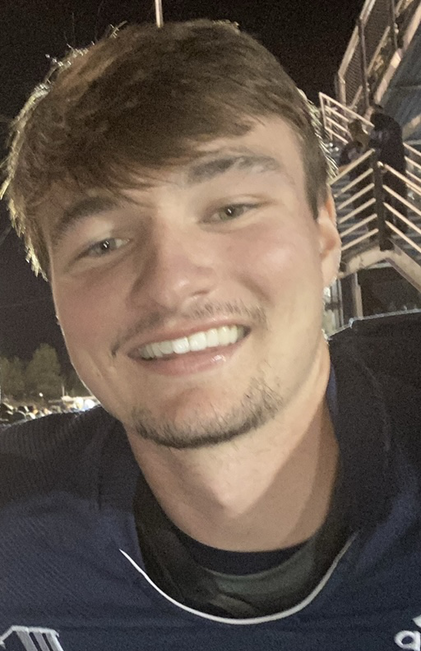
Carson Strong, replacing Josh Love after his short benching, threw for 76 yards and one interception for a dismal 56.3 QBR.

In Week 4, the Panthers hosted the Memphis Showboats. With the Showboats getting the ball first, the Showboats exploded for a 69-yard kickoff return to set themselves up at the Panthers 32 yard line. However, they immediately stalled out, electing for Alex Kessman to kick a 54-yard field goal, which he made to give Memphis an early 3–0. The Panthers got the ball back, but also stalled out on a 3 & out, choosing to punt. The teams exchanged 3 & outs before Memphis started a drive nearing Panthers' territory. The Showboats lurched for 28 yards before electing to kick another field goal, which they made to go up 6–0. The Panthers answered by two back-to-back 10+ yard plays and were looking poised to answer with a score before quarterback Josh Love threw an interception while at the Memphis 16 yard line. With the new drive, the Showboats quickly rushed down 68 yards to score on a Cole Kelley 1-yard quarterback sneak to extend the Showboats' lead to 13–0. The Panthers answered by constructing a slow and methodical drive, taking 14 plays to get on the board with a 24-yard field goal from Cole Murphy. With the Panthers holding the Showboats to a 3 & out, they got back in position to score after moving the ball down the field to the Showboats' 21-yard line. However, Strong threw an interception, which ended their drive and the first half to leave the Panthers down 3–13.

The Panthers got the ball to start the second half. However, despite a 24-yard rush from Stevie Scott, the Panthers stalled out and punted. With the ball, the Showboats then began a 10 play, 53-yard drive that culminated in a Kessman 37-yard field goal to extend the Showboats' lead to 16–3. With an opportunity to answer, the Panthers began a 7-minute, 14-play drive that crossed over into the fourth quarter. On 2nd and goal from the Memphis 3 yard line, Love rolled out to his left and threw a touchdown pass to Joe Walker to put the Panthers in a one score deficit at 10–16. The Showboats answered with another grudging drive, moving the ball 13 times over nearly 8 minutes to put the ball into the endzone with a Kelley 1-yard rush to mount a 23–10 lead. The Panthers got the ball back with 5:08 left in the game, beginning at their own 35 yard line. After gaining a first down, quarterback Love stepped back to pass, but was sacked by Jeff McCulloch, who forced a fumble. McCulloch picked the ball up and strolled into the endzone, extending their mounting lead to 29–10. The Panthers would have an opportunity to answer with 3:37 left in the game, but the kickoff was fumbled by Joe Walker, effectively ending the game at a 10–29 loss.

==== Week 5: vs. Pittsburgh Maulers ====
Week 5: Pittsburgh Maulers at Michigan Panthers – Game summary

Quarter	1	2	3	4	Total
**Maulers**	7	7	3	6	**23**
Panthers	7	0	0	0	**7**

at Ford Field

- Date: May 13
- Game time: 12:30 p.m. EST
- Referee: Stuart Mullins
- TV announcers (USA): Jac Collinsworth, Cam Jordan, Zora Stephenson

Game information

**First quarter**

- MICH – Cole Hikutini 5-yard pass from Josh Love (Cole Murphy kick good), 9:09. Michigan 7–0 **Drive: 5 plays, 26 yards, 2:33.**
- PIT – Mason Stokke 5-yard pass from Troy Williams (Chris Blewitt kick good), 2:02. Tied 7–7 **Drive: 6 plays, 80 yards, 2:54.**

**Second quarter**

- PIT – Isiah Hennie 5-yard pass from Troy Williams (Chris Blewitt kick good), 13:38. Pittsburgh 14–7 **Drive: 4 plays, 41 yards, 1:27.**

**Third quarter**

- PIT – Chris Blewitt 22-yard field goal, 1:25. Pittsburgh 17–7 **Drive: 9 plays, 74 yards, 4:41.**

**Fourth quarter**

- PIT – Troy Williams 13-yard rush (Chris Blewitt kick blocked), 3:05. Pittsburgh 23–7 **Drive: 4 plays, 24 yards, 1:56.**

**Top passers**

- PIT – Troy Williams – 15/19, 184 yards, 2 TD, INT
- MICH – Carson Strong – 13/23, 94 yards, INT

**Top rushers**

- PIT – Troy Williams – 10 rushes, 59 yards, TD
- MICH – Reggie Corbin – 9 rushes, 11 yards

**Top receivers**

- PIT – Bailey Gaither – 4 receptions, 89 yards
- MICH – Ishmael Hyman – 4 receptions, 43 yards

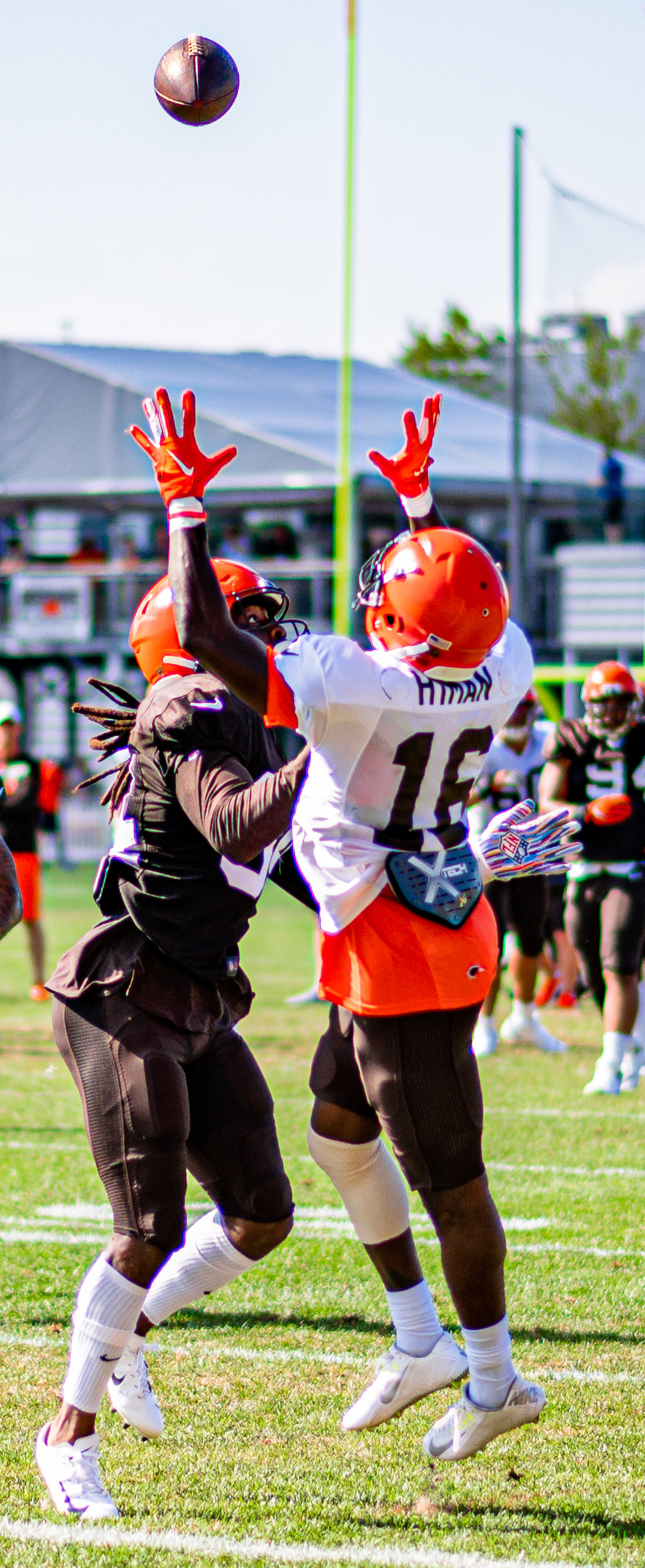
Ishmael Hyman led the Panthers in receiving, catching 4 passes for 43 receptions.

In Week 5, the Panthers hosted the Pittsburgh Maulers. The Maulers received the ball first, but failed to get a drive going after gaining a first down, punting. On the return, the Panthers fielded the punt at the endzone then brought it back 74 yards before being tackled at the Pittsburgh 26 yard line. With the excellent field position, the Panthers took 5 plays to score a touchdown with a Josh Love pass to Cole Hikutini. After getting the ball back with a chance to respond, Maulers quarterback Troy Williams threw a pass that was tipped and ultimately intercepted, putting the Panthers on the Maulers 46 yard line. With their second drive in enemy territory, the Panthers failed to get anything going and punted. With the ball back, the Maulers began to trudge down the field. An explosive 31-yard pass by Williams put the Maulers at the Panthers 35 yard line. The Maulers would score on a Williams 5-yard pass to halfback Mason Stokke to even the score at 7–7. With a chance to respond, the Panthers drew up a 26-yard pass on 3rd & 10. However, on the next play, Panthers running back Reggie Corbin fumbled on the Panthers 41-yard line, which was recovered by the Maulers. On the first play of their ensuing drive, quarterback Williams threw 28-yards to Isiah Hennie, putting them at the 13 yard line. The Maulers would score on a 5-yard pass, extending their lead to 14–7. With yet another chance to respond, the Panthers drove down to the Maulers 28-yard line. However, Love threw an interception into the endzone which was brought to the 25-yard line on a touchback. Love was subsequently benched for Carson Strong. The first half ended with both teams punting, bringing the halftime score to 14–7 in favor of Pittsburgh.

Both teams traded punts to open the second half with a second Panthers punt bringing the Maulers to their own 22. They drove 74 yards in 8 plays, but stalled on Michigan's 4 yard line, electing to kick a 22-yard field goal which they made to go up 17–7. The Panthers took the ball into the fourth quarter, but fumbled on the first play of the fourth quarter. Both teams punted, and with Pittsburgh's fumble on the first play of their drive, the Panthers began on Pittsburgh's 24 yard line. However, the offense sputtered, taking 6 plays to drive 13 yards, to ultimately end up with an interception in the end zone that was brought back to Michigan's 24 yard line. On the Maulers ensuing drive, they took just four plays to score with a Troy Williams 13-yard rush to extend their lead to 23–7. The Panthers would get a chance to respond, but turned the ball over on downs, effectively solidifying their 7–23 loss.

The Panthers offense scored the fewest points since Week 2 of their debut season. Despite their poor performance, defensive lineman Breeland Speaks exploded for 2.5 sacks, sending his season total to 6.5. Also, outside linebacker Frank Ginda tied the modern Panthers season interception record.

==== Week 6: vs. Birmingham Stallions ====
Week 6: Birmingham Stallions at Michigan Panthers – Game summary

Quarter	1	2	3	4	Total
**Stallions**	3	10	0	14	**27**
Panthers	3	0	7	3	**13**

at Ford Field

- Date: May 20
- Game time: 4:00 p.m. EST
- Referee: Bryan Banks
- TV announcers (FOX): Kevin Kugler, Joel Klatt, Devin Gardner

Game information

**First quarter**

- MICH – Cole Murphy 45-yard field goal, 9:12. Panthers 3–0 **Drive: 9 plays, 38 yards, 5:52.**
- BIRM – Brandon Aubrey 40-yard field goal, 6:47. Tied 3–3 **Drive: 5 plays, 37 yards, 2:26.**

**Second quarter**

- BIRM – Brandon Aubrey 25-yard field goal, 10:16. Stallions 6–3 **Drive: 14 plays, 81 yards, 7:51.**
- BIRM – ZaQuandre White 18-yard pass from Alex McGough (Brandon Aubrey kick good), 0:57. Stallions 13–3 **Drive: 10 plays, 62 yards, 4:39.**

**Third quarter**

- MICH – Cole Hikutini 11-yard pass from Josh Love (Cole Murphy kick good), 4:05. Stallions 13–10 **Drive: 13 plays, 77 yards, 7:02.**

**Fourth quarter**

- BIRM – C. J. Marable 4-yard pass from Alex McGough (Brandon Aubrey kick good), 13:05. Stallions 20–10 **Drive: 11 plays, 68 yards, 6:00.**
- MICH – Cole Murphy 31-yard field goal, 8:46. Stallions 20–13 **Drive: 5 plays, 14 yards, 2:39.**
- BIRM – Alex McGough 10-yard rush (Brandon Aubrey kick good), 3:27. Stallions 27–13 **Drive: 8 plays, 59 yards, 5:13.**
- BIRM – Alex McGough – 19/24, 133 yards, 2 TD
- MICH – Josh Love – 20/34, 222 yards, TD

**Top rushers**

- BIRM – C. J. Marable – 18 rushes, 100 yards
- MICH – Stevie Scott – 9 rushes, 46 yards

**Top receivers**

- BIRM – Adrian Hardy – 4 receptions, 37 yards
- MICH – Trey Quinn – 7 receptions, 108 yards

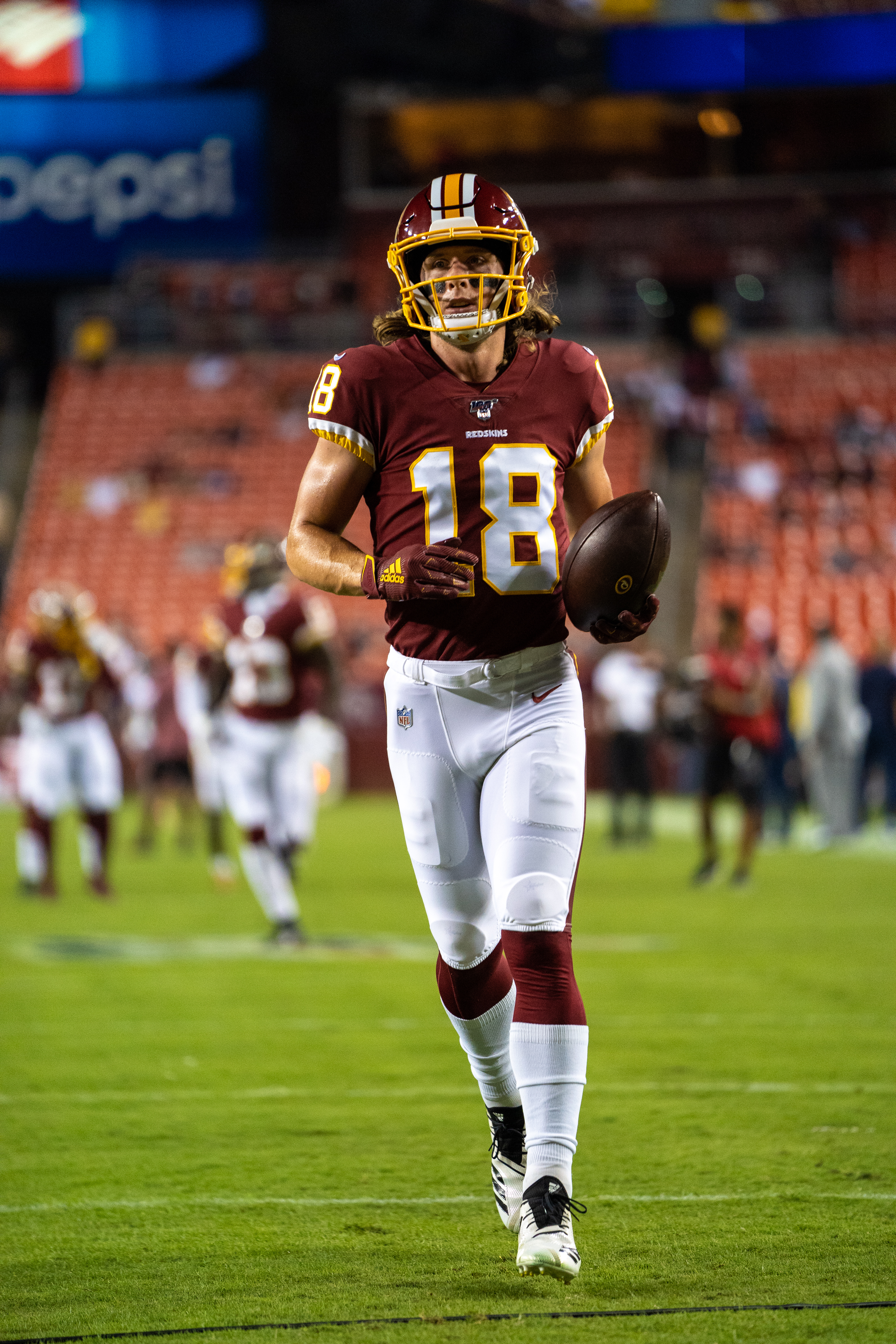
Wide receiver Trey Quinn (pictured with the Washington Redskins) led the Panthers in receiving, catching 7 passes for 108 yards, receiving a Player of the Week nomination.

In Week 6, the Panthers hosted the Birmingham Stallions. After getting the ball first, the Panthers moved the ball in short bursts, with a lurching drive that took them to the Stallions 27 yard line to score on a Cole Murphy 45-yard field goal to go up 3–0. With a chance to respond, the Stallions quickly drove downfield, only capturing a first down on a Alex McGough 28-yard rush. Their drive ended with a Brandon Aubrey 40-yard field goal. After a Panthers punt that made the Stallions begin their drive on their own 12-yard line, the Stallions offense orchestrated a 14 play drive that drove them into the second quarter. They would eventually score on a 25-yard field goal nearly 8 minutes after beginning the drive to take a 6–3 lead. The Panthers took an opportunity to respond, taking the ball all the way down to the Birmingham 30-yard line to attempt a 48-yard field goal, but Murphy missed the uprights, leaving the Panthers scoreless. The Stallions, picking the ball up where the Panthers lost it, wasted no time taking the ball 62 yards to score on an 18-yard pass to bring the Stallions lead to 13–3. The Panthers had a chance to respond with the final drive of the half, but, bringing the ball to the Birmingham 15 yard line, ran out of time as the first half expired.

Beginning the second half with the ball, the Stallions were unable to get anything going, and punted. With the ball at their own 23 yard line, the Panthers began what would be a 13 play, 77-yard drive that took up 7 minutes before quarterback Josh Love found tight end Cole Hikutini in the endzone to put the Panthers closer at a 10–13 deficit. With another drive stretching two quarters, the Stallions orchestrated an 11 play, 68-yard drive to end with Alex McGough finding running back C. J. Marable in the endzone to put them up 20–10. The Panthers failed to respond on their ensuing drive, going 3 and out, but a Stallions fumble on the first play of their drive would spark new hope in their offense, beginning their new drive at the Birmingham 27 yard line. However, despite a 16-yard gain bringing them to their 11-yard line, the offense would stall out, and the Panthers would settle for a field goal to bring them to a 13–20 deficit. The Panthers, needing a defensive stop, had the Stallions at 3rd and 1, poised for a 3 and out. However, the defense couldn't hold, allowing a 25-yard rush from C. J. Marable. The Stallions drive ended with an Alex McGough rushing touchdown, bringing the score to 27–13, which would be the final score.

==== Week 7: at New Jersey Generals ====
Week 7: Michigan Panthers at New Jersey Generals – Game summary

Quarter	1	2	3	4	Total
**Panthers**	0	6	6	13	**25**
Generals	3	0	7	12	**22**

at Tom Benson Hall of Fame Stadium

- Date: May 28
- Game time: 5:30 p.m. EST
- Referee: James Carter
- TV announcers (FS1): Jason Benetti, Joel Klatt, Devin Gardner

In Week 7, the Panthers will visit the New Jersey Generals.

== Standings ==
North Division
#		W	L	PCT	GB	DIV	PF	PA	STK
1	(y) Pittsburgh Maulers	4	6	.400	–	4–2	177	178	W2
2	(x) Michigan Panthers	4	6	.400	–	3–3	171	215	W1
3	(e) Philadelphia Stars	4	6	.400	–	2–4	220	258	L3
4	(e) New Jersey Generals	3	7	.300	1	3–3	187	212	L1
(x)–clinched playoff berth; (y)–clinched division; (e)–eliminated from playoff contention

=== Postseason ===
Week	Date	Time (ET)	Opponent	Result	Record	TV	Recap
Division Finals	June 24	8:00 p.m.	at Pittsburgh Maulers	L 27–31 (OT)	0–1	NBC	Recap
