= 2023 Houston Gamblers season =

American football season

- Owner: National Spring Football League Enterprises Co, LLC, (Fox Sports)
- General manager: Robert Morris
- Head coach: Curtis Johnson
- Home stadium: Simmons Bank Liberty Stadium

Results
- Record: 5–5
- Division place: 3rd in South Division
- Playoffs: Did not qualify

The 2023 season was the Houston Gamblers' 2nd and final season in the United States Football League and their 1st under head coach/general manager tandem of Curtis Johnson and Robert Morris.

== Draft ==
2023 Houston Gamblers draft
Round	Selection	Player	Position	College	Notes
1	3	Chase Brice	Quarterback	Appalachian State	
2	10	Justin Ford	Defensive end	Montana	
3	18	Joseph Fisher	Offensive guard	Shepherd	
4	26	Scott Matlock	Defensive tackle	Boise State	
5	34	Jeffrey Johnson	Defensive tackle	Oklahoma	
6	42	Keenan Issac	Defensive back	Alabama State	
7	50	Alex Jensen	Offensive tackle	South Dakota	
8	58	Brady Russell	Tight end	Colorado	
9	66	Jason Taylor II	Safety	Oklahoma State	
10	74	Colby Reeder	Linebacker	Iowa State	

== Final roster ==
2023 Houston Gamblers final roster
Quarterbacks: 11 Kenji Bahar; 6 Montell Cozart; 3 Terry Wilson; Running backs: 24 Benny LeMay; 32 Aaron Shampklin; 7 Mark Thompson; Wide receivers: 88 Emmanuel Butler; 81 Keke Chism; 17 Justin Hall; 16 Tyler Palka; 9 Teo Redding; 21 Isaiah Zuber; Tight ends: 8 Brandon Barnes; 85 Josh Pederson; 86 Rodell Rahmaan; 42 Clint Sigg	Offensive linemen: 66 Nick Buchanan C; 74 Avery Gennesy T; 77 Tyler Higby G; 78 Brandon Hitner T/G; 65 Jair Joseph G; 52 Braylon Jones G; 51 Na'Ty Rodgers T; 72 Jordan Steckler G; Defensive linemen: 92 Josh Avery DT; 45 Tim Bonner DE; 40 Isaiah Chambers DE; 55 Jeffery Johnson DT; 93 Chigozie Nnoruka DT; 90 Kristjan Sokoli DT; 93 Guy Thomas DT; 59 Reggie Walker DE	Linebackers: 15 Ronheen Bingham; 80 Chris Garrett; 30 Isaiah Pryor; 27 Marcel Spears Jr.; 44 Khalan Tolson; 18 J. T. Tyler; Defensive backs: 20 Nick Grant CB; 36 Jalen Green S; 2 Jeremiah Johnson CB; 33 Elijah Jones CB; 5 Bydarrius Knighten CB; 25 Dayan Lake S; 23 Isaiah Lewis S; 10 Malcolm Washington CB; Special teams: 94 Hunter Niswander P; 57 Ross Reiter LS; 19 Nick Vogel K	Reserve lists: -- Julian Allen TE (Susp.); 22 Manny Bunch S (IR); 99 Damion Daniels DT (IR); 13 Drew Galitz P (IR); 4 Shermari Jones RB (IR); 29 T. J. Pledger RB (IR); -- Bamidele Olaseni T (DNR); 92 Ike Onwuasoanya DT (IR); 17 Anthony Ratliff-Williams WR (IR); 38 Donald Rutledge Jr. S (IR); 14 Andrew Soroh S (IR); 49 active, 11 inactive

== Staff ==
2023 Houston Gamblers staff
Front office: General manager – Robert Morris; Head coaches: Head coach – Curtis Johnson; Offensive coaches: Offensive coordinator/quarterbacks – Eric Price; Running backs/wide receivers/offensive quality control – Garrett Chachere; Special teams/tight ends – Ray Rychleski; Offensive line – Andy Townsend	Defensive coaches: Defensive Coordinator/linebackers – Chris Wilson; Defensive line – Kwahn Drake; Defensive backs – Brett Maxie; Assistant defensive backs/defensive quality control – Zach Shagi

== Schedule ==
=== Regular season ===
Week	Date	Time (ET)	Opponent	Result	Record	TV	Venue	Recap
1	April 16	12:00 p.m.	vs. Michigan Panthers	**L** 13–29	0–1	NBC	Simmons Bank Liberty Stadium	Recap
2	April 22	12:30 p.m.	at **New Orleans Breakers**	**L** 31–38	0–2	USA	Protective Stadium	Recap
3	April 29	7:00 p.m.	vs. **Memphis Showboats**	**W** 30–26	1–2	Fox	Simmons Bank Liberty Stadium	Recap
4	May 6	1:00 p.m.	at Philadelphia Stars	**W** 41–16	2–2	Fox	Ford Field	Recap
5	May 13	4:00 p.m.	at **Birmingham Stallions**	**W** 27–20	3–2	Fox	Protective Stadium	Recap
6	May 21	4:00 p.m.	vs. New Jersey Generals	**W** 16–10	4–2	Fox	Simmons Bank Liberty Stadium	Recap
7	May 28	3:00 p.m.	at **Memphis Showboats**	**L** 20–23	4–3	USA	Simmons Bank Liberty Stadium	Recap
8	June 3	12:00 p.m.	at Pittsburgh Maulers	**W** 20–19	5–3	USA	Tom Benson Hall of Fame Stadium	Recap
9	June 11	1:00 p.m.	vs. **Birmingham Stallions**	**L** 15–38	5–4	NBC, Peacock (Note: Game coverage started on Peacock and NBC joined the game in progress.)	Simmons Bank Liberty Stadium	Recap
10	June 18	1:00 p.m.	vs. **New Orleans Breakers**	**L** 10–17	5–5	FS1	Simmons Bank Liberty Stadium	Recap

Bold indicates divisional opponent.

==== Week 1: vs. Michigan Panthers ====
Week 1: Michigan Panthers at Houston Gamblers – Game summary

Quarter	1	2	3	4	Total
**Panthers**	6	3	7	13	**29**
Gamblers	6	7	0	0	**13**

at Simmons Bank Liberty Stadium

- Date: April 16
- Game time: 12:00 p.m. EST
- Referee: Derek Anderson
- TV announcers (NBC): Jac Collinsworth (play-by-play), Jason Garrett (analyst), and Corey Robinson (sideline reporter)

Game information

**First quarter**

- MICH – Marcus Baugh 22-yard pass from Josh Love (Cole Murphy kick no good), 7:55. Panthers 6–0 **Drive: 7 plays, 81 yards, 3:19.**
- HOU – T.J. Pledger 2-yard run (Nick Vogel kick no good), 0:41. Tied 6–6 **Drive: 12 plays, 60 yards, 7:11.**

**Second quarter**

- MICH – Cole Murphy 35-yard field goal, 12:31. Panthers 9–6 **Drive: 7 plays, 42 yards, 2:51.**
- HOU – T.J. Pledger 2-yard run (Nick Vogel kick good), 8:56. Gamblers 13–9 **Drive: 3 plays, 17 yards, 1:32.**

**Third quarter**

- MICH – Stevie Scott 1-yard run (Cole Murphy kick good), 10:28. Panthers 16–13 **Drive 2 plays, 2 yards, 1:11.**

**Fourth quarter**

- MICH – Trey Quinn 24-yard pass from Josh Love (Cole Murphy kick no good), 8:46. Panthers 22–13 **Drive: 10 plays, 70 yards, 6:03.**
- MICH – Joe Walker 34-yard pass from Josh Love (Cole Murphy kick good), 1:44. Panthers 29–13 **Drive: 7 plays, 82 yards, 3:05.**

**Top passers**

- MICH – Josh Love – 18/20, 215 yards, 3 TD
- HOU – Kenji Bahar – 13/22, 109 yards, 2 INT

**Top rushers**

- MICH – Stevie Scott – 12 rushes, 61 yards, 1 TD
- HOU – T.J. Pledger – 16 rushes, 41 yards, 2 TD

**Top receivers**

- MICH – Joe Walker – 6 receptions, 105 yards, 1 TD
- HOU – Josh Pederson – 2 receptions, 23 yards

The Gamblers hosted the Michigan Panthers for their season opener. The Panthers began the scoring with a Marcus Baugh 22-yard reception from Josh Love. The Gamblers responded with a long drive capped off with a 2-yard rushing touchdown from T.J. Pledger to tie the game at 6–6. The Panthers extended their lead with a 35-yard field goal from Cole Murphy before the Gamblers answered with a T.J. Pledger 2-yard rushing touchdown on the back of a muffed punt by the Panthers, closing out the first half with Houston up 13–9. The second half began with a Panthers punt before Panthers cornerback William Saba intercepted Kenji Bahar to set the Panthers up 2-yards to score, which they capitalized off of with a Stevie Scott 2-yard run to put them in lead 16–13. The third quarter ended with a Houston fumble and a Michigan punt. In the fourth quarter, the Panthers drove the ball down the field, ending with a Trey Quinn 24-yard reception to put the Panthers ahead by 22–13. With Panthers defensive end Breeland Speaks forcing a fumble in the redzone, the Panthers quickly drove 82 yards down the field to score on a Joe Walker 34-yard reception to extend the Panthers' lead to 29–13, which would be the final score.

== Standings ==
South Division
#		W	L	PCT	GB	DIV	PF	PA	STK
1	(y) Birmingham Stallions	8	2	.800	–	4–2	287	196	W5
2	(x) New Orleans Breakers	7	3	.700	1	4–2	237	184	W3
3	(e) Houston Gamblers	5	5	.500	3	2–4	223	236	L2
4	(e) Memphis Showboats	5	5	.500	3	2–4	190	213	L2
(x)–clinched playoff berth; (y)–clinched division; (e)–eliminated from playoff contention
