= 2023 Pittsburgh Maulers season =

American football season

- Owner: National Spring Football League Enterprises Co, LLC, (Fox Sports)
- General manager: Lonnie Young
- Head coach: Ray Horton
- Home stadium: Tom Benson Hall of Fame Stadium

Results
- Record: 4–6
- League place: 1st in North Division
- Playoffs: Won Division Finals (vs. Panthers) 31–27 (OT); Lost USFL Championship (vs. Stallions) 12–28

The 2023 season was the Pittsburgh Maulers' 2nd season in the United States Football League and their 1st under the head coach/general manager tandem of Ray Horton and Lonnie Young. With their second win of the season in Week 5 against the Michigan Panthers, they improved upon their 1–9 record from the previous season, which was a league worst.

By defeating the New Jersey Generals in Week 10, they clinched their first-ever playoff berth. They also clinched their first division title the following day when the Panthers defeated the Philadelphia Stars.

Pittsburgh later defeated the Panthers in the USFL North Division Championship Game, advancing to their first USFL Championship, where they were defeated by the Birmingham Stallions.

== Draft ==
2023 Pittsburgh Maulers draft
Round	Selection	Player	Position	College	Notes
1	2	Lindsey Scott Jr.	Quarterback	Incarnate Word	
2	9	Malik Hamm	Defensive end	Lafayette	
3	17	Tre'Quan Dorsey	Offensive lineman	St. Francis University	
4	25	Ferlando Jordan	Defensive back	Southeastern Louisiana	
5	33	Isaiah Land	Defensive end	Florida A&M	
6	41	Nash Jensen	Offensive lineman	North Dakota State	
7	49	Taylor Grimes	Wide receiver	Incarnate Word	
8	57	C. J. Turner	Wide receiver	Southeastern Louisiana	
9	65	Jacob Slade	Defensive lineman	Michigan State	
10	73	Ethan Evans	Punter	Wingate	

== Roster ==
2023 Pittsburgh Maulers final roster
Quarterbacks: 12 James Morgan; 15 Connor Sampson; 11 Troy Williams; Running backs: 21 Duane Gary; 37 Garrett Groshek; 9 Madre London; 44 Mason Stokke; Wide receivers: 4 Bailey Gaither; 17 Isiah Hennie; 14 Ishmael Hyman; 38 Josh Simmons; 13 C. J. Turner; 89 Tre Walker; Tight ends: 85 Artayvious Lynn; 80 Matt Seybert	Offensive linemen: 52 Xavier Dampeer G/C; 67 Jon Dietzen G; 69 Tre'Quan Dorsey G; 51 Justin Evans T; 62 Leon Johnson T; 58 Brayden Patton C; 68 Terry Poole T; 50 Colby Thomas G; Defensive linemen: 91 Terry Beckner DT; 99 Izayah Green-May DE; 92 Will Miles DT; 90 Chris Okoye DT; 95 Nasir Player DE; 8 Boogie Roberts DT; 94 Olive Sagapolu DT; 56 Vaughn Taylor DE; 98 Savion Williams DT	Linebackers: 10 Reuben Foster; 27 Tyson Graham; 31 Kyahva Tezino; 45 Dale Warren; Defensive backs: 20 Malcolm Elmore S; 30 Mark Gilbert CB; 5 Keith Gipson Jr. CB; 29 Sedevyn Gray CB; 23 Ferlando Jordan CB; 34 Shedrick Kirk CB; 22 Xavier Lewis CB; 2 Arnold Tarpley III S; 1 Bryce Torneden S; 3 Eli Walker S; 25 Tre Wortham S; Special teams: 7 Chris Blewitt K; 48 Riley Lovingood LS; 19 Matt Mengel P	Reserve lists: -- Luke Barnes LS (Susp.); -- Myron Cunningham T (Susp.); 6 Malcolm Howard LB (IR); -- Jalen McCleskey WR (IR); -- Beau Tanner DB (IR); -- Leevel Tatum III DE Retired; 50 active, 6 inactive

== Staff ==
2023 Pittsburgh Maulers staff
Front office: General manager – Lonnie Young; Head coaches: Head coach – Ray Horton; Assistant head coach/defensive coordinator - Jarren Horton; Offensive coaches: Offensive coordinator/quarterbacks – John Tomlinson; Tight ends/running backs – Bill Khayat; Wide receivers - Alex Wood; Offensive line – Emerson Martin	Defensive coaches: Run game coordinator/defensive line – Rick Courtright; Linebackers coach/Special teams coordinator – Marc Hull; Defensive backs – Steve Meyer

== Schedule ==
=== Regular season ===
Week	Date	Time (ET)	Opponent	Result	Record	TV	Venue	Recap
1	April 16	6:30 p.m.	at New Orleans Breakers	**L** 15–22	0–1	FS1	Protective Stadium	Recap
2	April 23	1:00 p.m.	vs. **New Jersey Generals**	**L** 3–20	0–2	NBC	Tom Benson Hall of Fame Stadium	Recap
3	April 30	12:00 p.m.	at **Philadelphia Stars**	**W** 21–13	1–2	NBC	Ford Field	Recap
4	May 7	6:30 p.m.	vs. Birmingham Stallions	**L** 20–24	1–3	FS1	Tom Benson Hall of Fame Stadium	Recap
5	May 13	12:30 p.m.	at **Michigan Panthers**	**W** 23–7	2–3	USA	Ford Field	Recap
6	May 20	12:30 p.m.	at Memphis Showboats	**L** 0–22	2–4	USA	Simmons Bank Liberty Stadium	Recap
7	May 27	9:00 p.m.	vs. **Philadelphia Stars**	**L** 31–37	2–5	FS1	Tom Benson Hall of Fame Stadium	Recap
8	June 3	12:00 p.m.	vs. Houston Gamblers	**L** 19–20	2–6	USA	Tom Benson Hall of Fame Stadium	Recap
9	June 10	12:00 p.m.	vs. **Michigan Panthers**	**W** 19–7	3–6	Fox	Tom Benson Hall of Fame Stadium	Recap
10	June 17	1:00 p.m.	at **New Jersey Generals**	**W** 26–6	4–6	USA	Tom Benson Hall of Fame Stadium	Recap

Bold indicates divisional opponent.

== Standings ==
North Division
#		W	L	PCT	GB	DIV	PF	PA	STK
1	(y) Pittsburgh Maulers	4	6	.400	–	4–2	177	178	W2
2	(x) Michigan Panthers	4	6	.400	–	3–3	171	215	W1
3	(e) Philadelphia Stars	4	6	.400	–	2–4	220	258	L3
4	(e) New Jersey Generals	3	7	.300	1	3–3	187	212	L1
(x)–clinched playoff berth; (y)–clinched division; (e)–eliminated from playoff contention

=== Postseason ===
Round	Date	Time (ET)	Opponent	Result	Record	TV	Recap
Division Finals	June 24	8:00 p.m.	vs. Michigan Panthers	W 31–27 (OT)	1–0	NBC	Recap
USFL Championship	July 1	8:00 p.m.	at Birmingham Stallions	L 12–28	1–1	NBC	Recap
