= Josh Butler (American football) =

American football player (born 1996)

No. 26 – Chicago Bears
- Position: Cornerback
- Roster status: Practice squad
- CFL status: American

Personal information
- Born: November 25, 1996 (age 29); Dallas, Texas, U.S.
- Listed height: 6 ft 0 in (1.83 m)
- Listed weight: 192 lb (87 kg)

Career information
- High school: West Mesquite (TX)
- College: Michigan State (2015–2019)
- NFL draft: 2020: undrafted

Career history
- Conquerors (2021); Michigan Panthers (2023); Dallas Cowboys (2023–2025); Ottawa Redblacks (2026)*; Chicago Bears (2026–present)*
- * Offseason or practice squad member only

Career NFL statistics as of 2025
- Total tackles: 26
- Sacks: 1
- Pass deflections: 5
- Stats at Pro Football Reference

Josh Butler (born November 25, 1996) is an American professional football cornerback for the Chicago Bears of the National Football League (NFL). He played college football for the Michigan State Spartans before graduating in 2018. He also has played for the Michigan Panthers of the United States Football League (USFL).

== Early life ==
Butler was born on November 25, 1996 in Dallas, Texas. He attended West Mesquite High School, starting at cornerback during his final two years. He was ranked as the nation's 241st best prospect and the 26th best cornerback by Rivals.com. Additionally, he saw action as a return specialist and wildcat quarterback.

== Personal life ==
Butler appeared in a Mr. Beast video released on August 8th titled "Last to Leave Mansion, Keeps it" in which Internet personalities who had criticized Mr. Beast videos in the past competed for a mansion.

== College career ==
Butler redshirted his first season at Michigan State. As a redshirt freshman in 2016, he garnered snaps in 11 games, primarily on special teams. As a sophomore in 2017, he started four games and collected 12 tackles. As a junior, he started five games, with 10 tackles and three passes defended. During his senior season in 2018, he started seven games, missing time due to injury. He recorded 25 tackles and 5 pass breakups. During his senior night, Butler went viral for walking the field accompanied by his two dogs: Roxy and Remi. Butler lost both his parents during his time at Michigan State.

== Professional career ==
Pre-draft measurables
Height	Weight	Wingspan	40-yard dash	20-yard shuttle	Three-cone drill	Broad jump
5 ft 11 1/8 in (1.81 m)	176 lb (80 kg)	6 ft 2 in (1.88 m)	4.44 s	4.12 s	6.78 s	9 ft 9 in (2.97 m)
All values from Pro Day

=== The Spring League ===
In 2021, Butler played for the Conquerors of the developmental The Spring League.

=== Michigan Panthers ===
On March 22, 2023, Butler agreed to terms with the Michigan Panthers of the United States Football League. Butler started all 11 games (including the postseason), tallying 35 tackles and 4 passes defended.

=== Dallas Cowboys ===
On July 25, 2023, the Dallas Cowboys of the National Football League signed Butler to their preseason roster. During the preseason, Butler collected 9 tackles and a tackle-for-loss, while also defending 2 passes in the final preseason game. While he was cut from the 53-man roster, he was later signed to the Dallas Cowboys practice squad. He signed a reserve/future contract on January 15, 2024.

Butler was waived by the Cowboys on August 27, 2024, and re-signed to the practice squad. He was promoted to the active roster on November 18. In five games for Dallas, he totaled five pass deflections, one sack, and 21 combined tackles. Butler suffered a torn ACL in Week 13 against the New York Giants, and was ruled out for the season.

On August 30, 2026, Butler was waived by the Cowboys as a part of final roster cuts.

=== Ottawa Redblacks ===
On October 12, 2026, Butler signed to the practice roster of the Ottawa Redblacks of the Canadian Football League (CFL). On October 22, he was released.

=== Chicago Bears ===
On October 29, 2026, Butler was signed to the Chicago Bears practice squad.

== Career statistics ==
=== Regular season ===
Year	Team	Games		Tackles					Interceptions						Fumbles		
Year	Team	GP	GS	Cmb	Solo	Ast	Sck	Sfty	Int	Yds	Avg	Lng	TD	PD	FF	FR	TD
2023	MICH	10	10	32	22	10	0.0	0	0	0	0.0	0	0	4	0	0	0
		10	10	32	22	10	0.0	0	0	0	0.0	0	0	4	0	0	0

=== Postseason ===
Year	Team	Games		Tackles					Interceptions						Fumbles		
Year	Team	GP	GS	Cmb	Solo	Ast	Sck	Sfty	Int	Yds	Avg	Lng	TD	PD	FF	FR	TD
2023	MICH	1	1	3	1	2	0.0	0	0	0	0.0	0	0	0	0	0	0
		1	1	3	1	2	0.0	0	0	0	0.0	0	0	0	0	0	0

=== Regular season ===
Year	Team	Games		Tackles					Interceptions						Fumbles		
Year	Team	GP	GS	Cmb	Solo	Ast	Sck	Sfty	Int	Yds	Avg	Lng	TD	PD	FF	FR	TD
2023	DAL	0	0	Did not play													
2024	DAL	5	3	21	17	4	1.0	0	0	0	0.0	0	0	5	0	0	0
Career		5	3	21	17	4	1.0	0	0	0	0.0	0	0	5	0	0	0

=== Postseason ===
Year	Team	Games		Tackles					Interceptions						Fumbles		
Year	Team	GP	GS	Cmb	Solo	Ast	Sck	Sfty	Int	Yds	Avg	Lng	TD	PD	FF	FR	TD
2023	DAL	0	0	Did not play													
Career		0	0	0	0	0	0.0	0	0	0	0.0	0	0	0	0	0	0
