= 2023 New Jersey Generals season =

American football season

- Owner: National Spring Football League Enterprises Co, LLC, (Fox Sports)
- General manager: Billy Devaney
- Head coach: Mike Riley
- Home stadium: Tom Benson Hall of Fame Stadium

Results
- Record: 3–7
- Division place: 4th in North Division
- Playoffs: Did not qualify

The 2023 New Jersey Generals season is the second season for the New Jersey Generals as a professional American football franchise and their first under general manager Billy Devaney as well as their second under head coach Mike Riley. They failed to improve upon their 9–1 record from the previous season after their second loss of the season in Week 4 against the New Orleans Breakers. The team missed the playoffs after posting a 3–7 record.

== Offseason ==
=== Stadium plans ===
Shortly before the completion of the 2022 season, the USFL announced plans to move into two or four hubs for teams to play in. In November, the USFL was reportedly exploring options of having a hub in Metro Detroit, with possible locations being the Eastern Michigan Eagles' Rynearson Stadium and the Detroit Lions' Ford Field.

=== Draft ===
The Generals clinched the sixth overall pick in the 2023 USFL draft and held the sixth pick in each round.

2023 New Jersey Generals Draft
Round	Selection	Player	Position	College	Notes
2	15	Adrian Martinez	Quarterback	Kansas State	
3	23	J.J. Holloman	Wide receiver	Tennessee State	
4	31	Victor Jones	Defensive lineman	Akron	
5	39	De'Jahn Warren	Cornerback	Jackson State	
6	45	Derrick Tucker	Safety	Texas Southern	
7	53	Jermaine McDaniel Jr.	Defensive end	North Carolina A&T	
8	61	Adam Korsak	Punter	Rutgers	
9	69	Jalen Holston	Running back	Virginia Tech	
10	77	Nick Zecchino	Long snapper	Purdue	
10	80	Ray Estes	Defensive back	Grambling State	The Generals had their first round pick moved to the end of the 10th round due to a violation in offseason rules.

== Staff ==
2023 New Jersey Generals staff
Front office: General manager – Billy Devaney; Head coaches: Head coach – Mike Riley; Assistant head coach/offensive coordinator/offensive line – Steven Smith; Offensive coaches: Quarterbacks/wide receivers – Zerick Rollins Jr.; Running backs/tight ends/assistant special teams – Jay Locey; Special teams/wide receivers – Steve Hagan	Defensive coaches: Defensive coordinator/linebackers – Ted Cottrell; Defensive line/assistant special teams – Dezmon Walker; Secondary/assistant special teams – Sheldon Dawson; Assistant secondary/assistant special teams – Pete Riley

== Final roster ==
2023 New Jersey Generals final roster
Quarterbacks: 8 Eric Barriere; 1 De'Andre Johnson; 9 Dakota Prukop; Running backs: 29 Kingston Davis; 27 Darius Victor; 3 Trey Williams; Wide receivers: 18 Cameron Echols-Luper; 14 Marcus Green; 23 Arthur Jackson; 13 Alonzo Moore; 10 Warren Newman; 15 De'Mornay Pierson-El; 82 Darrell Stewart Jr.; Tight ends: 80 Braedon Bowman; 88 Woody Brandom; 17 Wes Saxton	Offensive linemen: 71 Calvin Ashley G; 60 Cam Carter T; 76 Brandon Haskin T; 69 Evan Heim G; 68 Jake Lacina C; 72 Bruce Trigg G; 79 Micah Vanterpool T; 66 Saige Young G/C; Defensive linemen: 90 Toby Johnson DT; 93 Hercules Mataʻafa DE; 91 Jermaine McDaniel DE; 59 Kenny Randall DT/DE; 95 Deyon Sizer DE; 97 Tyrone Truesdell DT; 98 Kalani Vakameilalo DT; 56 Bryson Young DE	Linebackers: 50 Jalen Choice; 51 Willie Eubanks III; 55 Kolin Hill; 4 D'Juan Hines; 2 Chris Orr; 45 Brendon White; Defensive backs: 7 Dravon Askew-Henry S; 12 Mike Bell S; 40 Anthony Blue CB; 20 D. J. Daniel CB; 30 Treston Decoud CB; 25 Meiko Dotson CB; 24 Paris Ford S; 5 Shalom Luani S; 6 Christian Tutt CB; 28 De'Jahn Warren CB; Special teams: 19 Brock Miller P; 44 Jordan Ober LS; 28 Nick Sciba K	Reserve lists: 75 Isaiah Battle T (IR); 26 Blake Countess CB (IR); 21 Trae Elston S (IR); 89 Charles Jones TE (IR); 70 Robert Myers G (IR); 99 Tyshun Render DE (Susp.); 51 active, 6 inactive

== Schedule ==
=== Regular season ===
Week	Date	Time (ET)	Opponent	Result	Record	TV	Venue	Recap
1	April 15	7:30 p.m.	at Birmingham Stallions	**L** 10–27	0–1	Fox	Protective Stadium	Recap
2	April 23	1:00 p.m.	at **Pittsburgh Maulers**	**W** 20–3	1–1	NBC	Tom Benson Hall of Fame Stadium	Recap
3	April 30	4:00 p.m.	at **Michigan Panthers**	**W** 28–13	2–1	Fox	Ford Field	Recap
4	May 7	3:00 p.m.	vs. New Orleans Breakers	**L** 17–20	2–2	NBC	Tom Benson Hall of Fame Stadium	Recap
5	May 14	12:00 p.m.	at **Philadelphia Stars**	**L** 21–24	2–3	NBC	Ford Field	Recap
6	May 21	4:00 p.m.	at Houston Gamblers	**L** 10–16	2–4	Fox	Simmons Bank Liberty Stadium	Recap
7	May 28	5:30 p.m.	vs. **Michigan Panthers**	**L** 22–25	2–5	FS1	Tom Benson Hall of Fame Stadium	Recap
8	June 4	1:00 p.m.	vs. Memphis Showboats	**L** 16–25	2–6	Fox	Tom Benson Hall of Fame Stadium	Recap
9	June 11	7:00 p.m.	vs. **Philadelphia Stars**	**W** 37–33	3–6	Fox	Tom Benson Hall of Fame Stadium	Recap
10	June 17	1:00 p.m.	vs. **Pittsburgh Maulers**	**L** 6–26	3–7	USA	Tom Benson Hall of Fame Stadium	Recap

Bold indicates divisional opponent.

== Standings ==
North Division
#		W	L	PCT	GB	DIV	PF	PA	STK
1	(y) Pittsburgh Maulers	4	6	.400	–	4–2	177	178	W2
2	(x) Michigan Panthers	4	6	.400	–	3–3	171	215	W1
3	(e) Philadelphia Stars	4	6	.400	–	2–4	220	258	L3
4	(e) New Jersey Generals	3	7	.300	1	3–3	187	212	L1
(x)–clinched playoff berth; (y)–clinched division; (e)–eliminated from playoff contention
