= 2023 Memphis Showboats season =

American football season

- Owner: National Spring Football League Enterprises Co, LLC, (Fox Sports)
- General manager: Dave Razzano
- Head coach: Todd Haley
- Home stadium: Simmons Bank Liberty Stadium

Results
- Record: 5–5
- League place: 4th in South Division
- Playoffs: Did not qualify

The 2023 season was the Memphis Showboats' inaugural season in the United States Football League, their first at Simmons Bank Liberty Stadium, and their first under the head coach/general manager tandem of Todd Haley and Dave Razzano.

== Offseason ==
=== Stadium Plans ===
Shortly before the completion of the 2022 season, the USFL announced plans to move into two or four hubs for teams to play in. In November, the USFL was reportedly exploring options of having a hub in Metro Detroit, with possible locations being the Eastern Michigan Eagles' Rynearson Stadium and the Detroit Lions' Ford Field.

When it was announced that the Showboats would be added to the USFL to take the place of the former Tampa Bay Bandits, it was announced that Memphis would be one of the hub cities for the 2023 season. They will share their hub with the Houston Gamblers.

=== Draft ===
The Showboats clinched the 4th pick in the 2023 USFL draft and hold the fourth pick in each round.

2023 Memphis Showboats Draft
Round	Selection	Player	Position	College	Notes
1	4	Mason Brooks	Offensive tackle	Mississippi State	
2	11	Isaiah Bolden	Cornerback	Jackson State	
3	19	Brevin Allen	Defensive end	Campbell	
4	27	Benny Sapp III	Defensive back	Northern Iowa	
5	35	Michael Ezeike	Tight end	UCLA	
6	43	Jerome Carvin	Offensive lineman	Tennessee	
7	51	Nehemiah Shelton	Cornerback	San Jose State	
8	59	Trea Shropshire	Wide receiver	UAB	
9	67	Silas Dzansi	Offensive lineman	Virginia Tech	
10	75	Antonio Fletcher	Safety	Southern Illinois	

== Roster ==
2023 Memphis Showboats final roster
Quarterbacks: 15 Cole Kelley; 10 Ryan Willis; 3 Brady White; Running backs: 11 Ezra Gray; 8 Juwan Washington; 9 Kerrith Whyte; Wide receivers: 4 Derrick Dillon; 18 Ryan McDaniel; 12 Osirus Mitchell; 19 D. J. Myers; 13 Vinny Papale; Tight ends: 80 Daniel Helm; 85 John Mitchell; 88 Jay Jay Wilson	Offensive linemen: 69 Matt Burrell C; 67 Tyran Hunt G; 77 Jarron Jones T; 65 Corbin Kaufusi T; 51 Jordan McCray C; 75 Lukayus McNeil G; 55 Terronne Prescod G; 64 Kwan Stallworth G/T; Defensive linemen: 99 John Atkins DT; 59 Big Kat Bryant DE; 56 Kahzin Daniels DE; 90 Dillon Faamatau DT; 45 Jordan Ferguson DE; 57 Frank Herron DE; 93 Sulaiman Kamara DT; 33 Jeff McCulloch DE; 97 Cory Thomas DT; 95 Jordan Williams DE	Linebackers: 50 Anthony Butler; 35 Nate Hall; 20 Aaron Hansford; 39 Malik Lawal; 5 T. J. Neal; 41 Greg Reaves; Defensive backs: 21 Delrick Abrams CB; 14 T. J. Green S; 40 Stephen Griffin S; 24 Jermaine Kelly CB; 23 Lamont McPhatter II S; 7 Quenton Meeks CB; 42 Antonio Reed S; 32 Nehemiah Shelton CB; 22 Troy Warner S; 27 Kyree Woods S; Special teams: 44 Ryan DiSalvo LS; 17 Alex Kessman K; 16 Brandon Wright P/K	Reserve lists: 70 Clayton Bradley G (IR); 2 Alex Collins RB (IR); 6 Rashard Davis WR (IR); 1 John Franklin WR (IR); -- Sadarius Hutcherson G (DNR); 61 Darta Lee T (IR); 94 Daylon Mack DT (IR); 81 C. J. O'Grady TE (Susp.); 98 Jeremiah Valoaga DE (IR); 51 active, 9 inactive

== Staff ==
2023 Memphis Showboats staff
Front office: General manager – Dave Razzano; Head coaches: Head coach – Todd Haley; Offensive coaches: Offensive coordinator/running backs – Bob Saunders; Offensive quality control/wide receivers – Yale van Dyne; Special teams/tight ends – Frank Gansz Jr.; Offensive line – James Saxon	Defensive coaches: Defensive coordinator – Carnell Lake; Defensive line – Trey Jackson; Linebackers – Steven Thompson; Defensive quality control/defensive backs – Brock Marion

== Schedule ==
=== Regular season ===
Week	Date	Time (ET)	Opponent	Result	Record	TV	Venue	Recap
1	April 15	4:30 p.m.	vs. Philadelphia Stars	**L** 23–27	0–1	Fox	Simmons Bank Liberty Stadium	Recap
2	April 22	7:00 p.m.	**at Birmingham Stallions**	**L** 2–42	0–2	Fox	Protective Stadium	Recap
3	April 29	7:00 p.m.	**at Houston Gamblers**	**L** 26–30	0–3	Fox	Simmons Bank Liberty Stadium	Recap
4	May 6	7:30 p.m.	at Michigan Panthers	**W** 29–10	1–3	NBC	Ford Field	Recap
5	May 14	3:00 p.m.	**at New Orleans Breakers**	**W** 17–10	2–3	Fox	Protective Stadium	Recap
6	May 20	12:30 p.m.	vs. Pittsburgh Maulers	**W** 22–0	3–3	USA	Simmons Bank Liberty Stadium	Recap
7	May 28	3:00 p.m.	**vs. Houston Gamblers**	**W** 23–20	4–3	USA	Simmons Bank Liberty Stadium	Recap
8	June 4	1:00 p.m.	at New Jersey Generals	**W** 25–16	5–3	Fox	Tom Benson Hall of Fame Stadium	Recap
9	June 10	3:00 p.m.	**vs. New Orleans Breakers**	**L** 3–31	5–4	NBC, CNBC (Note: Rain delay caused the 2nd through 4th quarters to be shown on CNBC, due to local and primetime programming on NBC.)	Simmons Bank Liberty Stadium	Recap
10	June 17	4:00 p.m.	**vs. Birmingham Stallions**	**L** 20–27	5–5	Fox	Simmons Bank Liberty Stadium	Recap

Bold indicates divisional opponent.

== Standings ==
South Division
#		W	L	PCT	GB	DIV	PF	PA	STK
1	(y) Birmingham Stallions	8	2	.800	–	4–2	287	196	W5
2	(x) New Orleans Breakers	7	3	.700	1	4–2	237	184	W3
3	(e) Houston Gamblers	5	5	.500	3	2–4	223	236	L2
4	(e) Memphis Showboats	5	5	.500	3	2–4	190	213	L2
(x)–clinched playoff berth; (y)–clinched division; (e)–eliminated from playoff contention
