= Cole Hikutini =

American football player (born 1994)

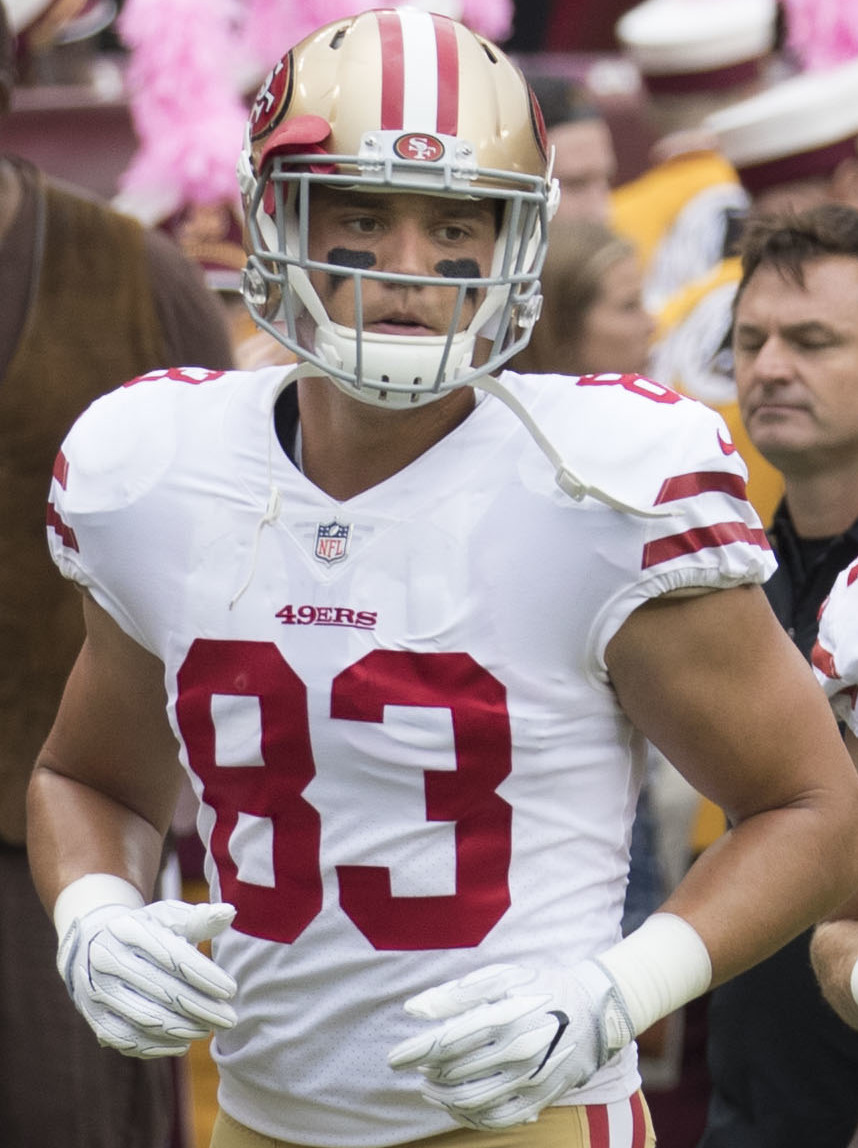
- Hikutini with the San Francisco 49ers in 2017

No. 80 – Michigan Panthers
- Position: Tight end
- Roster status: Active

Personal information
- Born: June 11, 1994 (age 32); San Francisco, California, U.S.
- Listed height: 6 ft 4 in (1.93 m)
- Listed weight: 240 lb (109 kg)

Career information
- High school: Pleasant Grove (Elk Grove, California)
- College: Sacramento State (2012–2013); San Francisco City College (2014); Louisville (2015–2016)
- NFL draft: 2017: undrafted

Career history
- San Francisco 49ers (2017); Minnesota Vikings (2018–2019)*; Dallas Cowboys (2019–2021)*; New York Giants (2021)*; Michigan Panthers (2023–present)
- * Offseason or practice squad member only

Awards and highlights
- Second-team All-ACC (2016)

Career NFL statistics
- Receptions: 2
- Receiving yards: 15
- Stats at Pro Football Reference

Cole Kenna Hikutini (born June 11, 1994) is an American professional football tight end for the Michigan Panthers of the United Football League (UFL). He played college football at the University of Louisville.

== Early life ==
Hikutini attended Pleasant Grove High School in Elk Grove, California, where he was a two-way player. As a senior, he collected 27 receptions for 536 yards and six touchdowns, receiving second-team All-Delta River League honors as a defensive back. He had 143 receiving yards and one touchdown against Lincoln High School.

== College career ==
Hikutini accepted a football scholarship from Sacramento State. He was redshirted in 2012. As a freshman in 2013, he appeared in nine games, starting the last four, while registering 21 receptions and five touchdowns. He had five receptions for 42 yards and two touchdowns against the University of Montana.

Hikutini transferred to San Francisco City College in 2014. He posted 40 receptions for 658 yards and four touchdowns. He transferred to the University of Louisville after his sophomore season.

As a junior, Hikutini appeared in 11 games (three starts), making 19 receptions (fourth on the team) for 348 yards (fourth on the team) and three touchdowns (tied for second on the team). As a senior, playing alongside Heisman Trophy winner quarterback Lamar Jackson, he recorded 50 receptions (led the team) for 668 yards (second on the team) and eight touchdowns (led the team). Hikutini suffered a knee injury during the 9-29 Citrus Bowl loss against LSU.

=== Statistics ===
Season	Team	Games		Receiving			
Season	Team	GP	GS	Rec	Yds	Avg	TD
2012	Sacramento State	0	0	Redshirted (redshirt)			
2013	Sacramento State	9	4	21	204	9.7	5
2014	CC of San Francisco	13	—	40	658	16.4	4
2015	Louisville	11	3	19	348	18.3	3
2016	Louisville	13	10	50	668	13.4	8
Career		46	17	130	1,878	14.4	20

== Professional career ==
Pre-draft measurables
Height	Weight	Arm length	Hand span	40-yard dash	10-yard split	20-yard split	20-yard shuttle	Three-cone drill	Vertical jump	Broad jump	Bench press
6 ft 4 1/8 in (1.93 m)	247 lb (112 kg)	32 3/4 in (0.83 m)	10 in (0.25 m)	4.85 s	1.68 s	2.77 s	4.57 s	7.22 s	34.5 in (0.88 m)	10 ft 0 in (3.05 m)	20 reps
All values from NFL Combine/Louisville Pro Day

=== San Francisco 49ers ===
Hikutini was signed by the San Francisco 49ers as an undrafted free agent on May 4, 2017. He was waived on September 2, and was signed to the practice squad the next day. He was promoted to the active roster on October 14. In Week 7, in the 40–10 loss to the Dallas Cowboys, he had his first career NFL reception, a five-yard catch. He was placed on the injured reserve list on November 6.

On September 1, 2018, Hikutini was waived by the 49ers.

=== Minnesota Vikings ===
On September 3, 2018, Hikutini was signed to the Minnesota Vikings' practice squad. He signed a reserve/future contract with the Vikings on January 2, 2019. Hikutini was waived by Minnesota on August 31.

=== Dallas Cowboys ===
On September 2, 2019, Hikutini was signed to the Dallas Cowboys practice squad. On December 30, Hikutini was signed to a reserve/future contract.

On September 4, 2020, Hikutini was waived by the Cowboys and re-signed to the practice squad. He signed a reserve/future contract with the Cowboys on January 4, 2021. Hikutini was waived by the Cowboys on March 19.

=== New York Giants ===
On March 30, 2021, Hikutini was signed by the New York Giants, reuniting with offensive coordinator Jason Garrett, who was his head coach with the Cowboys in 2019. He was waived/injured on August 24, and placed on injured reserve. He was released on September 2.

=== Michigan Panthers ===
On October 7, 2022, Hikutini signed with the Michigan Panthers of the United States Football League (USFL). On May 4, 2023, he was placed on the inactive list. On May 11, Hikutini was activated. He appeared in nine games (six starts), recording 21 receptions for 239 yards and five touchdowns. Hikutini re-signed with the team on September 24, 2024.

== NFL career statistics ==
=== Regular season ===
Year	Team	Games		Receiving				
Year	Team	GP	GS	Rec	Yds	Avg	Lng	TD
2017	SF	4	0	2	15	7.5	10	0
Career		4	0	2	15	7.5	10	0

== USFL/UFL career statistics ==
=== Regular season ===
Year	Team	League	Games		Receiving				
Year	Team	League	GP	GS	Rec	Yds	Avg	Lng	TD
2023	MICH	USFL	9	6	21	239	11.4	36	5
2024	MICH	UFL	10	8	12	204	17.0	48	1
2025	MICH	UFL	9	3	13	162	12.3	35	1
Career			28	17	46	605	13.2	36	7

=== Postseason ===
Year	Team	League	Games		Receiving				
Year	Team	League	GP	GS	Rec	Yds	Avg	Lng	TD
2023	MICH	USFL	1	0	3	42	14.0	27	0
2024	MICH	UFL	1	1	3	15	5.0	8	0
Career			2	1	6	57	9.5	27	0

== Personal life ==
Hikutini has lived in San Francisco, Sacramento, Elk Grove, and Wilton.
