= Josh Love =

American gridiron football player (born 1996)

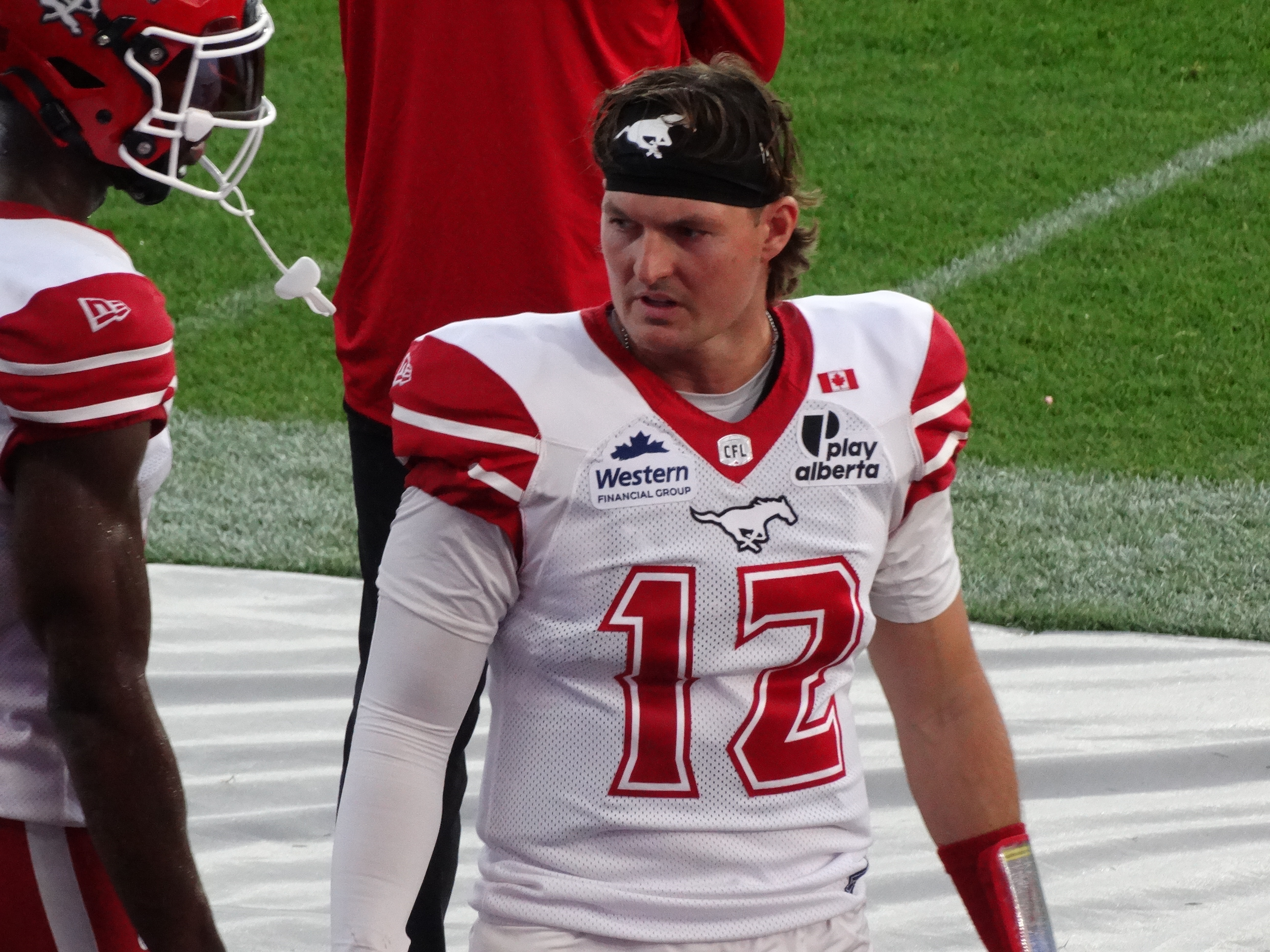
- Love with the Calgary Stampeders in 2026

No. 12 – Calgary Stampeders
- Position: Quarterback
- Roster status: Active
- CFL status: American

Personal information
- Born: September 12, 1996 (age 30); Mission Viejo, California, U.S.
- Listed height: 6 ft 0 in (1.83 m)
- Listed weight: 199 lb (90 kg)

Career information
- High school: Long Beach Polytechnic (Long Beach, California)
- College: San Jose State (2015–2019)
- NFL draft: 2020: undrafted

Career history
- Los Angeles Rams (2020)*; Carolina Panthers (2021)*; Pittsburgh Maulers (2022); Michigan Panthers (2022–2023); Memphis Showboats (2024); Calgary Stampeders (2025–present)
- * Offseason or practice squad member only

Awards and highlights
- MW Offensive Player of the Year (2019); First-team All-MW (2019); CFL record

Career CFL statistics as of 2026
- Games played: 24
- Passing completions: 38
- Passing attempts: 60
- Passing yards: 413
- TD-INT: 1–2
- Stats at CFL.ca

Joshua Michael Love (born September 12, 1996) is an American professional football quarterback for the Calgary Stampeders of the Canadian Football League (CFL). He played college football for San Jose State. He also played for the Los Angeles Rams and Carolina Panthers of the National Football League (NFL) and the Pittsburgh Maulers of the United States Football League (USFL).

== Early life ==
Love grew up in Mission Viejo, California, and initially attended Orange Lutheran High School and Tesoro High School before transferring to Long Beach Polytechnic High School after his sophomore year. He shared snaps at quarterback during his junior year but finished the season with 17 touchdown passes to just two interceptions. As a senior, Love passed for 3,199 yards and 41 touchdowns as he led the Jackrabbits to an 11–2 record and was named the Moore League Offensive Player of the Year. Love was lightly recruited coming out of high school and committed to play college football at San Jose State University as a preferred walk-on.

== College career ==
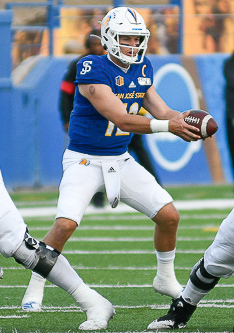
Love with the San José State Spartans in 2019

Love walked-on to the San Jose State Spartans football team and redshirted his true freshman season and was awarded a scholarship at the end of the year. He played in all 12 of SJSU's games the following season, serving as the holder on the field goal unit and throwing passes in five games with one start, completing 31 of 60 passes for 392 yards with two touchdowns and five interceptions. As a redshirt sophomore Love played in nine games with five starts, completing 54.1% of his passes for 928 yards and five touchdowns with seven interceptions. He became the Spartans' starting quarterback early during his redshirt junior season and finished the year with 1,963 yards and 14 touchdowns while completing 56.1% of his passes. Love started all of SJSU's games as a senior and was named the Mountain West Conference Player of the Week after completing 32 of 49 passes for 402 yards and two touchdowns in a 31–24 upset win over Arkansas. He finished the season with for 3,923 passing yards and 22 touchdowns with a 60.9% completion percentage and was named first-team All-Mountain West Conference and was the first Spartan to be named the conference Offensive Player of the Year since San Jose State joined the conference. Love finished his collegiate career with the third most passing yards in school history with 7,206 yards and seventh all-time with 43 touchdown passes.

=== College statistics ===
| Season | Team | Games | | | Passing | | | | | | | | Rushing | | |
| Season | Team | GP | GS | Record | Comp | Att | Pct | Yds | TD | Int | Rtg | Att | Yds | Avg | TD |
|---|---|---|---|---|---|---|---|---|---|---|---|---|---|---|---|
| 2015 | San Jose State | 0 | 0 | — | Redshirted (redshirt) | | | | | | | | | | |
| 2016 | San Jose State | 12 | 1 | 0–1 | 31 | 60 | 51.7 | 392 | 2 | 5 | 100.9 | 14 | -41 | -2.9 | 0 |
| 2017 | San Jose State | 9 | 5 | 1–4 | 92 | 170 | 54.1 | 928 | 5 | 7 | 101.4 | 19 | −60 | −3.2 | 0 |
| 2018 | San Jose State | 8 | 8 | 1–7 | 162 | 289 | 56.1 | 1,963 | 14 | 9 | 122.9 | 30 | −93 | −3.1 | 0 |
| 2019 | San Jose State | 12 | 12 | 5–7 | 293 | 481 | 60.9 | 3,923 | 22 | 8 | 141.2 | 25 | −88 | −3.5 | 3 |
| Career | | 41 | 26 | 7–19 | 578 | 1,000 | 57.8 | 7,206 | 43 | 29 | 126.7 | 88 | -282 | -3.2 | 3 |

== Professional career ==
Pre-draft measurables
| Height | Weight | Arm length | Hand span | Wingspan |
|---|---|---|---|---|
| 6 ft 0 3/8 in (1.84 m) | 203 lb (92 kg) | 30 1/2 in (0.77 m) | 8 3/4 in (0.22 m) | 6 ft 0 in (1.83 m) |
All values from Pro Day

=== Los Angeles Rams ===
Love signed with the Los Angeles Rams as an undrafted free agent on April 25, 2020, shortly after the conclusion of the 2020 NFL draft. He was waived on August 25, 2020.

=== Carolina Panthers ===
Love was signed to the Carolina Panthers practice squad on November 2, 2021. He was released on November 9.

=== Pittsburgh Maulers ===
Love was selected in the 12th round of the 2022 USFL draft by the Pittsburgh Maulers of the United States Football League (USFL). He was released on May 10, 2022.

=== Michigan Panthers ===
On May 10, 2022, Love was claimed off waivers by the Michigan Panthers of the United States Football League (USFL).

In the first game of the 2023 Michigan Panthers season, Love set the USFL record for highest completion percentage, with 90 percent of his passes having been completed.

=== Memphis Showboats ===
On March 13, 2024, Love signed with the Memphis Showboats of the United Football League (UFL).

=== Calgary Stampeders ===
On March 10, 2025, Love signed with the Calgary Stampeders of the Canadian Football League (CFL).

== Career statistics ==
=== USFL/UFL ===
| Year | Team | League | Games | | | Passing | | | | | | | | Rushing | | | |
| Year | Team | League | GP | GS | Record | Cmp | Att | Pct | Yds | Y/A | TD | Int | Rtg | Att | Yds | Avg | TD |
|---|---|---|---|---|---|---|---|---|---|---|---|---|---|---|---|---|---|
| 2022 | PIT | USFL | 3 | 3 | 0–3 | 40 | 73 | 54.8 | 440 | 6.0 | 2 | 2 | 70.6 | 2 | 11 | 5.5 | 0 |
| 2022 | MICH | USFL | 4 | 2 | 0–2 | 31 | 59 | 52.5 | 351 | 5.9 | 2 | 2 | 67.8 | 5 | 21 | 4.2 | 0 |
| 2023 | MICH | USFL | 9 | 9 | 3–6 | 143 | 236 | 60.6 | 1,556 | 6.6 | 13 | 10 | 80.8 | 27 | 49 | 1.8 | 0 |
| 2024 | MEM | UFL | 5 | 1 | 1–0 | 38 | 55 | 69.1 | 313 | 5.7 | 2 | 3 | 72.8 | 7 | 10 | 1.4 | 1 |
| Career | | | 21 | 15 | 4–11 | 252 | 423 | 59.5 | 2,660 | 6.2 | 19 | 17 | 75.7 | 41 | 91 | 2.2 | 1 |

=== CFL ===
| Year | Team | Games | | | Passing | | | | | | | | Rushing | | | |
| Year | Team | GD | GS | Record | Cmp | Att | Pct | Yds | Y/A | TD | Int | Rtg | Att | Yds | Y/A | TD |
|---|---|---|---|---|---|---|---|---|---|---|---|---|---|---|---|---|
| 2025 | CGY | 6 | 0 | — | 5 | 8 | 62.5 | 67 | 8.4 | 0 | 0 | 89.1 | 0 | 0 | 0 | 0 |
| 2026 | CGY | 11 | 1 | 1–0 | 31 | 46 | 67.4 | 332 | 7.2 | 1 | 2 | 77.4 | 0 | 0 | 0 | 0 |
| Career | | 17 | 1 | 1–0 | 36 | 54 | 66.7 | 399 | 7.4 | 1 | 2 | 79.2 | 0 | 0 | 0.0 | 0 |
