= Garrett Marino =

American gridiron football player (born 1994)

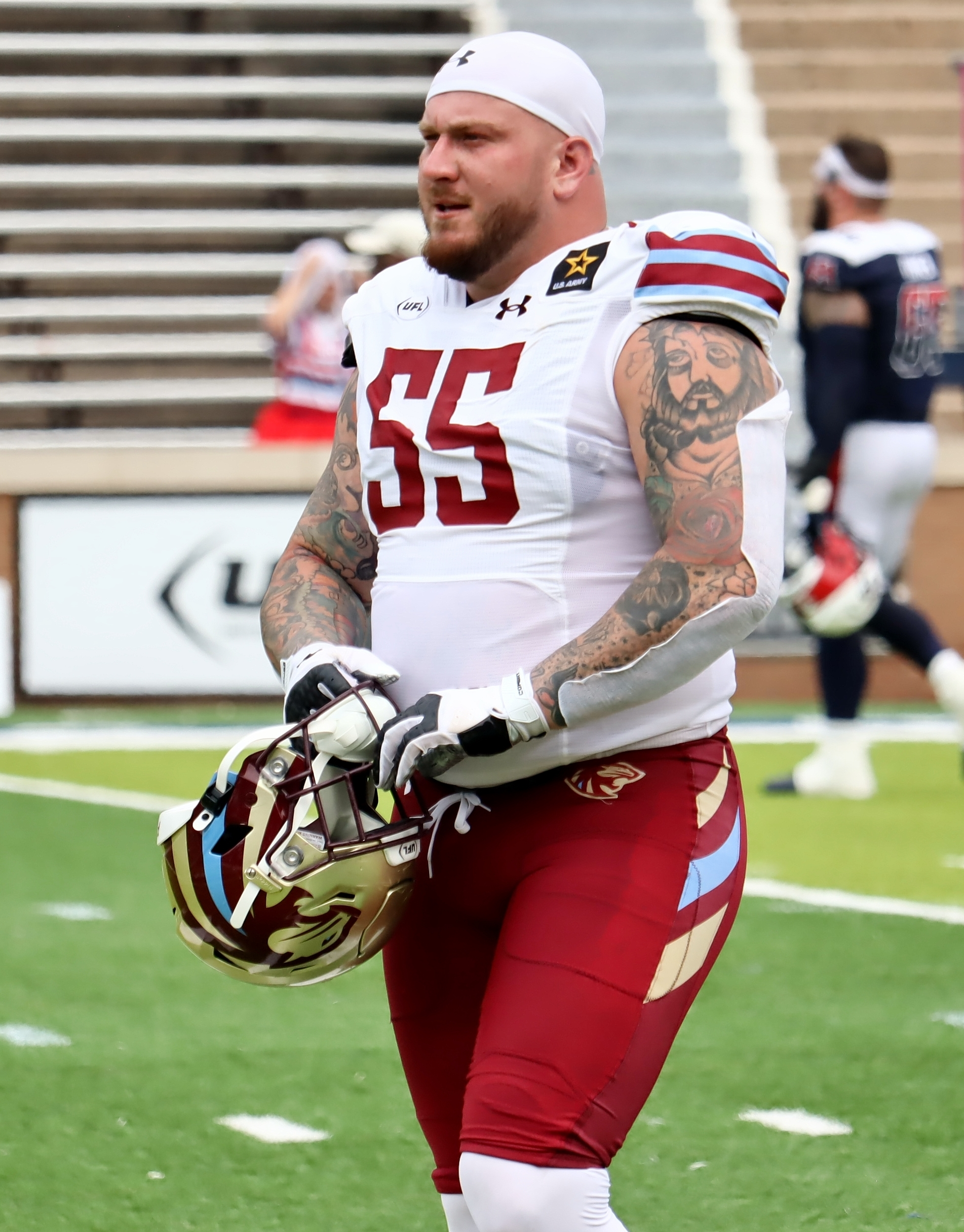
- Marino with the Michigan Panthers in 2024

Profile
- Position: Defensive tackle

Personal information
- Born: August 3, 1994 (age 32); Mission Viejo, California, U.S.
- Listed height: 6 ft 2 in (1.88 m)
- Listed weight: 290 lb (132 kg)

Career information
- High school: Mission Viejo (California)
- College: UAB
- NFL draft: 2020: undrafted

Career history
- Dallas Cowboys (2020)*; Saskatchewan Roughriders (2021–2022); Michigan Panthers (2023–2025)
- * Offseason or practice squad member only

Awards and highlights
- First-team All-C-USA (2019)

Garrett Scott Marino (born August 3, 1994) is an American professional football defensive lineman. He played college football at the University of Alabama at Birmingham. He has also played for the Saskatchewan Roughriders of the Canadian Football League (CFL).

== Early life ==
Marino attended Mission Viejo High School in Mission Viejo, California. As a senior, he was a starter at defensive end, tallying 40 tackles and 14 sacks. He received All-League, All-Pac 5 Division, All-CIF, All-Orange County and second-team All-State honors.

He also was named the MVP of both the Southern California All-Star Game and the Arizona vs. California All-Star Game.

== College career ==
Marino committed to play at Arizona State University on January 15, 2013. He did not qualify academically and sat out the season. In 2014, he decided to accept a football scholarship from Montana State University instead. As a true freshman, he appeared in 6 games with 3 starts at defensive end, contributing with 8 tackles (one for a loss). On October 20, 2014, he was dismissed from the team for unspecified reasons.

He signed a letter of intent with the University of Alabama at Birmingham in August 2015, and was forced to wait 2 years for the Blazers' football program to be reinstated from its original termination. He was redshirted in 2016.

As a sophomore in 2017, he appeared in 13 games with 6 starts in the final games. He tallied 33 tackles (8 for loss). He had 5 tackles against Alabama A&M University. He made 4 tackles and one fumble recovery against the University of Texas at San Antonio.

As a junior in 2018, he appeared in 13 games with 9 starts. He registered 19 tackles (6.5 for loss) and 3.5 sacks, while contributing to the team ranking ninth nationally in total defense. He had a 48-yard fumble return for a touchdown against Tulane University. He made 5 quarterback hurries and a safety against the University of North Texas.

As a senior in 2019, he appeared in 14 games with 13 starts, posting 43 tackles (13.5 for loss), 6 sacks, 7 pass breakups, one forced fumble, one fumble recovery and one blocked kick. He had 9 tackles against Alabama State University and received C-USA Defensive Player of the Week honors. He made 5 tackles (3 for loss) against the University of North Texas to help the team win the C-USA West Division title in the final game of the regular season. He was named first-team All-Conference USA, after receiving honorable mentions in each of the two previous seasons.

Marino played 40 games for the Blazers compiling 95 tackles, 28 tackles for loss, 10 sacks, 100 pass breakups, one forced fumble and 3 fumble recoveries. He also returned one fumble recovery for a 48-yard touchdown.

== Professional career ==
=== Dallas Cowboys ===
At his pro day, Marino ran a 4.89 40-yard dash and put up 41 official reps on bench press. In preparation for the NFL draft, he played in the 2020 Shrine Bowl, making two tackles and one tackle for loss. There were also considerations about being undersized for his position and that he would turn 26 years old before the start of 2020 NFL regular season.

Marino was signed as an undrafted free agent by the Dallas Cowboys after the 2020 NFL draft on April 27, 2020. He competed for a roster spot at defensive tackle and was released with a non-football illness before the start of the season on July 28.

=== Saskatchewan Roughriders ===
On January 14, 2021, he was signed by the Saskatchewan Roughriders in the Canadian Football League, when the league resumed operations, following the COVID-19 pandemic. In the Banjo Bowl against the Winnipeg Blue Bombers, he was ejected from the game for throwing punches. He concluded his first season in the CFL, having played in 7 games with 5 starts, making 13 tackles and 4 sacks.

In a game against the Ottawa Redblacks in 2022, Marino hit quarterback Jeremiah Masoli with a low tackle. Masoli was predicted to be out for 10–12 weeks after having surgery to repair the damage in his leg that was caused by the hit. Marino celebrated the hit and injury to the dismay of the Ottawa players. Following the game, Marino was summoned for a disciplinary hearing and he was subsequently suspended for 4 games as a result of his actions. Reasons for his suspension were listed by Commissioner Randy Ambrosie as: two games for a low and dangerous hit and then celebrating the hit; another game for an illegal and reckless tackle on an offensive lineman on an earlier play; and a fourth game for "verbal comments made about Masoli's heritage during the game". He returned to action for the Riders' Week 11 match against the BC Lions. Following his first game back from a suspension, Marino was fined by the league for unnecessary roughness. The following week, Marino was involved in another controversial play in which he leveled the Winnipeg Blue Bombers starting quarterback Zach Collaros, while the ball was not in the vicinity of either player. He was released by the Riders two days later on September 6, 2022. He appeared in 8 games with 6 starts, making 7 defensive tackles and one sack. There were reports after Marino was released by Saskatchewan that CFL commissioner Ambrosie had issued a memo to the teams saying if any team signed Marino, the former could refuse to register the contract due to player safety reasons.

=== Michigan Panthers ===
On September 18, 2022, Marino announced on Twitter that he had signed a contract with the Michigan Panthers of the United States Football League (USFL). On October 6, the team announced the official signing.

On May 18, 2023, he was placed on the inactive list. On May 26, he was activated. He appeared in nine games with nine starts, making 25 tackles and 2.5 sacks. Marino re-signed with the Panthers on August 12, 2024.
