= Kenji Bahar =

American football player (born 1997)

Rhein Fire
- Position: Quarterback
- Roster status: Active

Personal information
- Born: September 21, 1997 (age 29); Baltimore, Maryland, U.S.
- Listed height: 6 ft 3 in (1.91 m)
- Listed weight: 200 lb (91 kg)

Career information
- High school: Calvert Hall (Towson, Maryland)
- College: Monmouth (2015–2019)
- NFL draft: 2020: undrafted

Career history
- Baltimore Ravens (2021)*; Toronto Argonauts (2021)*; Baltimore Ravens (2021); Houston Gamblers / Roughnecks (2022–2024); Massachusetts Pirates (2025); Rhein Fire (2026–present)
- * Offseason or practice squad member only

Awards and highlights
- Big South Offensive Player of the Year (2019); First-team All-Big South (2019); Second-team All-Big South (2018)

Career UFL statistics
- Passing completions: 218
- Passing attempts: 354
- Completion percentage: 61.6%
- Passing yards: 2,253
- TD–INT: 10-11
- QBR: 76.4

Kenji Bahar (born September 21, 1997) is an American professional football quarterback for the Rhein Fire of the American Football League Europe (AFLE). He played college football for the Monmouth Hawks.

== College career ==
Bahar was a member of the Monmouth Hawks for five seasons, redshirting his true freshman season. He was named second-team All-Big South Conference after passing for 2,626 yards and 20 touchdowns in his redshirt junior season. As a redshirt senior, he completed 289 of 448 passing attempts for 3,684 yards and 30 touchdowns with four rushing touchdowns and was named the Big South Offensive Player of the Year. Bahar set school records with 9,642 passing yards and 70 touchdown passes.

== Professional career ==
Pre-draft measurables
Height	Weight	Arm length	Hand span	40-yard dash	10-yard split	20-yard split	20-yard shuttle	Three-cone drill	Vertical jump	Broad jump
6 ft 2 1/2 in (1.89 m)	200 lb (91 kg)	34 1/8 in (0.87 m)	9 1/8 in (0.23 m)	4.74 s	1.67 s	2.71 s	4.37 s	7.13 s	34.0 in (0.86 m)	10 ft 0 in (3.05 m)
All values from Pro Day

=== Baltimore Ravens (first stint) ===
Bahar signed with the Baltimore Ravens as an undrafted free agent on May 13, 2021. He was waived on June 4.

=== Toronto Argonauts ===
Bahar attended training camp with the Toronto Argonauts but was released in first round of roster cuts on July 20, 2021.

=== Baltimore Ravens (second stint) ===
The Baltimore Ravens re-signed Bahar on July 28, 2021, after Ravens starting quarterback Lamar Jackson was placed on the Reserve/COVID-19 list. Bahar was waived by the Ravens when Jackson was activated off the list on August 6, 2021. The Ravens re-signed Bahar again on August 16, 2021, after quarterback Trace McSorley suffered a back injury and was again waived on August 24, 2021. He was re-signed by the Ravens to their practice squad on November 23, 2021, and released on November 29, 2021. Bahar was re-signed to the practice squad on December 25, 2021, and was elevated to the active roster the following day for the Ravens' Week 16 game against the Cincinnati Bengals. He was released on December 28.

=== Houston Gamblers / Roughnecks ===
Bahar was selected in the 12th round of the 2022 USFL draft by the Houston Gamblers. He was transferred to the inactive roster on April 30, 2022, with a hand injury.

Bahar re-signed with the Gamblers on September 30, 2023. Bahar and all other Houston Gamblers players and coaches were all transferred to the Houston Roughnecks after it was announced that the Gamblers took on the identity of their XFL counterpart, the Roughnecks. He was released on January 24, 2024, and re-signed with the team on April 10. He was released on May 6.

=== Massachusetts Pirates ===
On January 2, 2025, Bahar signed with the Massachusetts Pirates of the Indoor Football League (IFL).

=== Rhein Fire ===
On January 14, 2026, Bahar signed with the Rhein Fire of the American Football League Europe (AFLE).

== Career statistics ==
=== Professional ===
Spring Football statistics
Year	Team	League	Games			Passing								Rushing			
Year	Team	League	GP	GS	Record	Cmp	Att	Pct	Yds	Y/A	TD	Int	Rtg	Att	Yds	Avg	TD
2022	HOU	USFL	7	3	2–1	61	100	61.0	541	5.4	2	2	73.8	20	87	4.4	0
2023	HOU	USFL	9	9	4–5	157	254	61.8	1,712	6.7	8	9	77.4	23	68	3.0	0
2024	HOU	UFL	1	0	—	0	0	0.0	0	0.0	0	0	0.0	0	0	0	0
Career			17	12	6–6	218	354	61.6	2,253	6.4	10	11	76.4	43	155	3.6	0

=== College ===
Season	Team	Games			Passing								Rushing			
Season	Team	GP	GS	Record	Cmp	Att	Pct	Yds	Y/A	TD	Int	Rtg	Att	Yds	Avg	TD
2015	Monmouth	0	0	—	Redshirt											
2016	Monmouth	11	3	0–3	97	166	58.4	964	5.8	4	6	107.9	24	-20	-0.8	2
2017	Monmouth	12	12	9–3	205	331	61.9	2,368	7.2	16	13	130.1	53	33	0.6	2
2018	Monmouth	11	11	8–3	207	345	60.0	2,626	7.6	20	6	139.6	53	143	2.7	3
2019	Monmouth	14	14	11–3	289	448	64.5	3,684	8.2	30	9	151.7	76	177	2.3	4
Career		48	40	28–12	798	1,290	61.9	9,642	7.5	70	34	137.3	206	333	1.6	11
