= Reggie Corbin =

American football player (born 1996)

No. 3
- Position: Running back

Personal information
- Born: March 9, 1996 (age 30); Upper Marlboro, Maryland, U.S.
- Listed height: 5 ft 8 in (1.73 m)
- Listed weight: 205 lb (93 kg)

Career information
- High school: Gonzaga College High School
- College: Illinois
- NFL draft: 2020: undrafted

Career history
- BC Lions (2021)*; Michigan Panthers (2022–2023)
- * Offseason or practice squad member only

Awards and highlights
- All-USFL Team (2022); Third-team All-Big Ten (2019); USFL records: Longest rushing touchdown (88 yards)

Reginald Corbin (born March 9, 1996) is an American former football running back. He played college football at Illinois, and attended training camp of the BC Lions in 2021 but was released in first round of cuts. Corbin was later drafted into the USFL. Corbin holds the record for the longest rushing touchdown in USFL history, an 88 yard run against the Philadelphia Stars in Week 5 of the 2022 season. He was not part of the roster after the 2024 UFL dispersal draft on January 15, 2024.

Pre-draft measurables
Height	Weight	Arm length	Hand span	40-yard dash	10-yard split	20-yard split	20-yard shuttle	Three-cone drill	Vertical jump	Broad jump	Bench press
5 ft 8 1/8 in (1.73 m)	205 lb (93 kg)	29 3/4 in (0.76 m)	8 in (0.20 m)	4.65 s	1.58 s	2.67 s	4.45 s	6.93 s	38.0 in (0.97 m)	9 ft 11 in (3.02 m)	20 reps
All values from Pro Day
