= Trey Quinn =

American football player (born 1995)

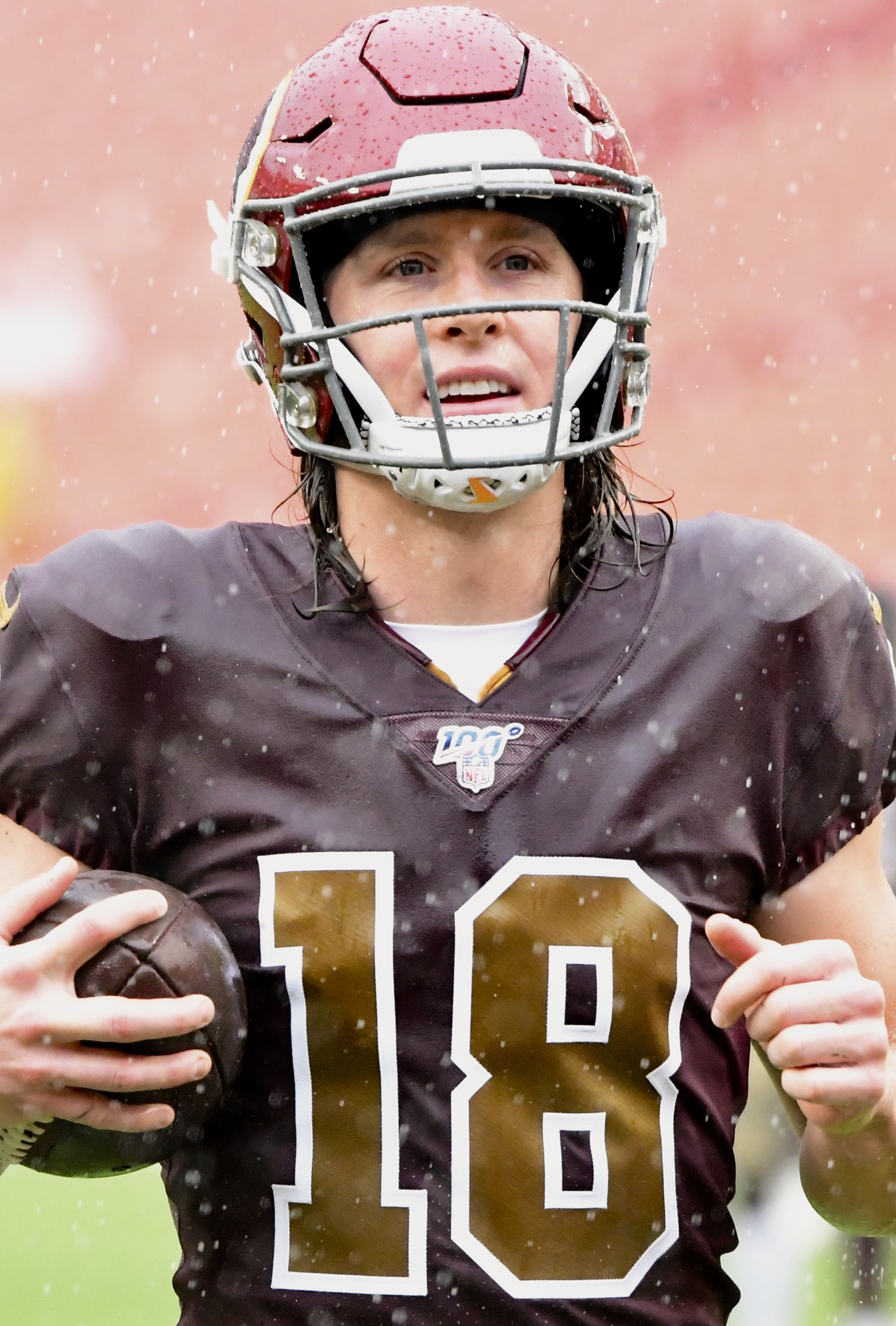
- Quinn with the Washington Redskins in 2019

No. 14, 18, 16
- Position: Wide receiver

Personal information
- Born: December 7, 1995 (age 30); Lake Charles, Louisiana, U.S.
- Listed height: 6 ft 0 in (1.83 m)
- Listed weight: 200 lb (91 kg)

Career information
- High school: Alfred M. Barbe (Lake Charles)
- College: LSU (2014–2015); SMU (2016–2017)
- NFL draft: 2018: 7th round, 256th overall pick

Career history
- Washington Redskins (2018–2019); Jacksonville Jaguars (2020); Las Vegas Raiders (2021)*; Denver Broncos (2022)*; Michigan Panthers (2023); Detroit Lions (2023)*; Michigan Panthers (2024)
- * Offseason or practice squad member only

Awards and highlights
- First-team All-AAC (2017)

Career NFL statistics
- Receptions: 35
- Receiving yards: 273
- Receiving touchdowns: 2
- Stats at Pro Football Reference

David Lee "Trey" Quinn III (born December 7, 1995) is an American former professional football player who was a wide receiver in the National Football League (NFL). He played college football for the LSU Tigers and SMU Mustangs. Quinn was selected by the Washington Redskins with the final pick of the 2018 NFL draft, making him that year's Mr. Irrelevant. He was also a member of the Jacksonville Jaguars, Las Vegas Raiders, Denver Broncos, Michigan Panthers, and Detroit Lions.

== Early life ==
As a child, Quinn played baseball for the Southwest region, representing the state of Louisiana at the 2008 Little League World Series, where he threw a no-hitter in the opening round. The team finished in fourth place, losing the U.S. Championship to Hawaii and the consolation game to Japan.

Quinn attended Barbe High School in Lake Charles, Louisiana. Along with football, Quinn also played baseball and ran track. During his senior year at Barbe, he recorded 1,967 receiving yards and 23 touchdowns. He finished his high school career with 70 touchdowns and 6,566 receiving yards, making him the national all-time career leader in receiving yards. A 4-star recruit, Quinn committed to play football for LSU in August 2013, choosing the Tigers over offers from Auburn, California, Clemson, Notre Dame, Oklahoma State, and Texas, among others.

== College career ==
=== LSU ===
Quinn began his college football career at LSU in 2014. He played in 13 games for the Tigers as a true freshman, finishing the season with 17 receptions for 193 yards. As a sophomore in 2015, he played in all 12 of LSU's games. He caught five passes for 83 yards. He left the team after the season.

=== SMU ===
Quinn transferred to Southern Methodist University (SMU) prior to the 2016 season. Due to NCAA transfer rules, Quinn sat out the 2016 season and redshirted. As a redshirt junior in 2017, Quinn played in all 13 games for SMU, catching 114 passes for 1,236 yards and 13 touchdowns. After the season, Quinn declared for the 2018 NFL draft.

=== College statistics ===
Season	Team	Games		Receiving			
Season	Team	GP	GS	Rec	Yds	Avg	TD
2014	LSU	13	7	17	193	11.4	0
2015	LSU	12	2	5	83	16.6	0
2016	SMU	transfer redshirt (redshirt)					
2017	SMU	13	13	114	1,236	10.8	13
Career		38	22	136	1,512	11.1	13

== Professional career ==
Pre-draft measurables
Height	Weight	Arm length	Hand span	40-yard dash	10-yard split	20-yard split	20-yard shuttle	Three-cone drill	Vertical jump	Broad jump	Bench press
5 ft 11 3/8 in (1.81 m)	203 lb (92 kg)	30 3/4 in (0.78 m)	10 1/8 in (0.26 m)	4.52 s	1.58 s	2.55 s	4.17 s	6.91 s	33.5 in (0.85 m)	9 ft 8 in (2.95 m)	17 reps
All values from NFL Combine/Pro Day

=== Washington Redskins ===
Quinn was selected by the Washington Redskins in the seventh round (256th overall) of the 2018 NFL draft, making him Mr. Irrelevant. He suffered a high-ankle injury during the first game of the season and was subsequently placed on injured reserve a few days later. He was activated off injured reserve on November 14, 2018. He was placed back on injured reserve on December 5, 2018, after re-injuring his ankle. He finished his rookie year with 75 receiving yards and 1 touchdown on 9 receptions.

In Week 1 of the 2019 NFL season against the Philadelphia Eagles, Quinn caught 4 passes for 33 yards and a touchdown as the Redskins lost 27–32. In the Week 13 win against the Carolina Panthers, he was removed from the game after sustaining a helmet-to-helmet hit on a punt return and was diagnosed with a concussion. After missing the next two games due to concussion symptoms, he was placed on injured reserve on December 17, 2019. Quinn was waived on September 5, 2020.

=== Jacksonville Jaguars ===
On September 6, 2020, Quinn signed to the practice squad of the Jacksonville Jaguars. He was placed on the practice squad/COVID-19 list by the team on October 17, 2020, and was activated back to the practice squad on October 22. He was elevated to the active roster on November 28 for the team's week 12 game against the Cleveland Browns, and reverted to the practice squad after the game. He was placed on the practice squad/injured list on November 30. His practice squad contract with the team expired after the season on January 11, 2021.

=== Las Vegas Raiders ===
On January 12, 2021, Quinn signed a reserve/future contract with the Las Vegas Raiders. He was waived/injured on August 10, 2021, and placed on injured reserve. He was released on August 26.

=== Denver Broncos ===
On April 27, 2022, Quinn signed with the Denver Broncos. He was waived on August 23, 2022.

=== Michigan Panthers (first stint) ===
On December 31, 2022, Quinn signed with the Michigan Panthers of the United States Football League (USFL). He was released from his contract on July 27, 2023, to sign with an NFL team.

=== Detroit Lions ===
On July 28, 2023, Quinn signed with the Detroit Lions. He was waived/injured on August 14, 2023. On October 2, 2023, Quinn re-signed with the Lions practice squad. He was released on October 10.

=== Michigan Panthers (second stint) ===
On January 19, 2024, Quinn re-signed with the Panthers.
