= Ishmael Hyman =

American football player (born 1995)

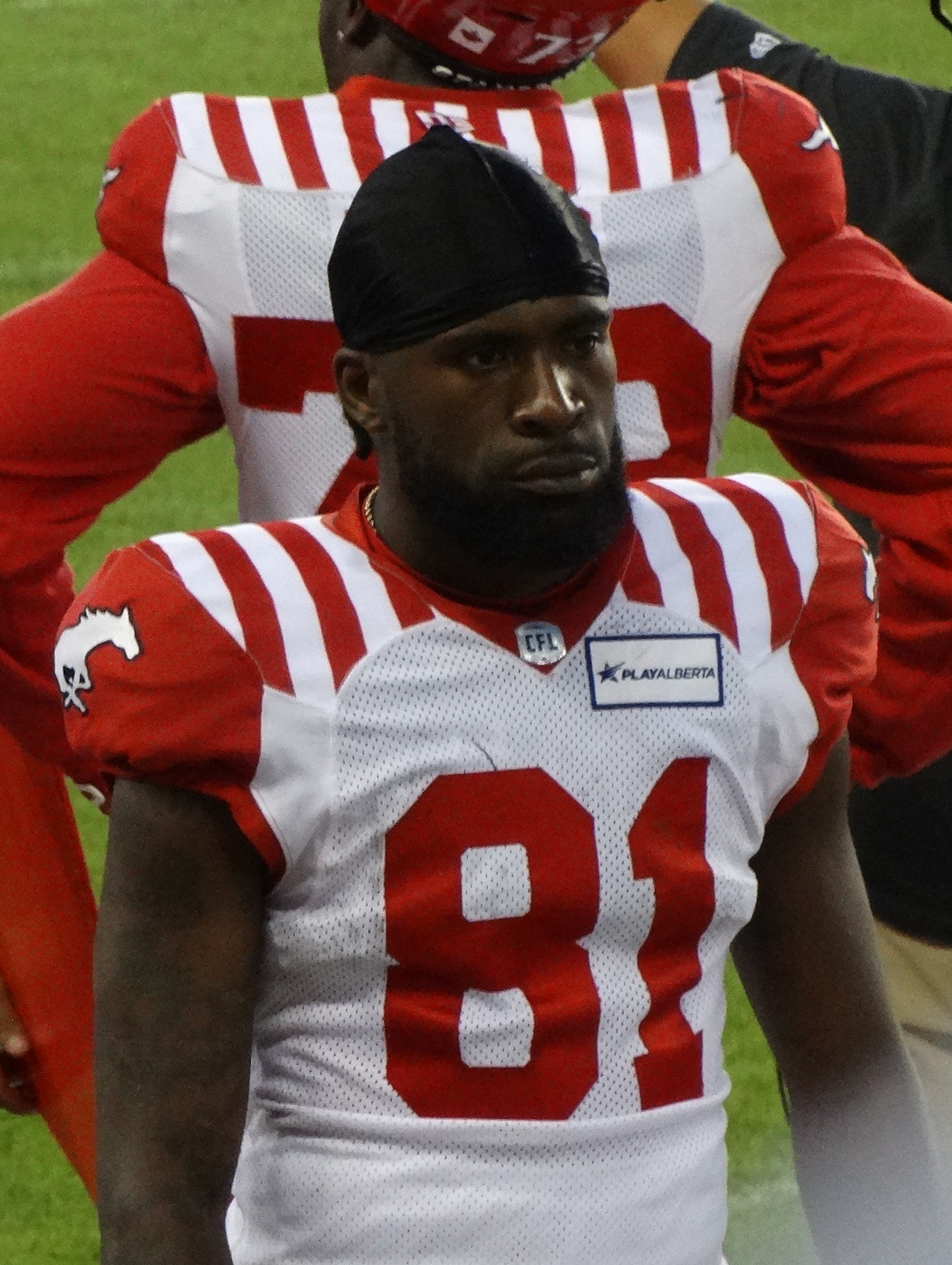
- Hyman with the Calgary Stampeders in 2024

No. 18
- Position: Wide receiver

Personal information
- Born: August 23, 1995 (age 31); Manalapan Township, New Jersey, U.S.
- Listed height: 6 ft 0 in (1.83 m)
- Listed weight: 196 lb (89 kg)

Career information
- High school: St. John Vianney (Holmdel, New Jersey)
- College: Kansas (2013); James Madison (2014–2017)
- NFL draft: 2018: undrafted

Career history
- Orlando Apollos (2019); Cleveland Browns (2019)*; Tampa Bay Buccaneers (2019); Carolina Panthers (2020–2021)*; Michigan Panthers (2022); Green Bay Packers (2022)*; Michigan Panthers (2023); Pittsburgh Maulers (2023); Calgary Stampeders (2024)
- * Offseason or practice squad member only

Awards and highlights
- FCS national champion (2016)

Career NFL statistics
- Receptions: 2
- Receiving yards: 34
- Stats at Pro Football Reference
- Stats at CFL.ca

Ishmael Hyman (born August 23, 1995) is an American former professional football player who was a wide receiver in the National Football League (NFL) and Canadian Football League (CFL). He played college football for the James Madison Dukes.

== Early life ==
Hyman grew up Manalapan, New Jersey, and attended St. John Vianney High School, where he played football and ran track. As a senior, he had 24 receptions for 428 yards and four touchdowns before suffering a season-ending injury and finished fourth in the state in the 200-meter dash. Rated a three-star recruit, Hyman committed to play college football at Kansas over offers from Boston College, James Madison, Rutgers, Syracuse, Temple, and Villanova.

== College career ==
Hyman began his collegiate career at the University of Kansas, redshirting his true first year with the Jayhawks before deciding to transfer to James Madison University at the end of the season. In four seasons with the Dukes, Hyman caught 72 passes for 1,061 yards and 11 touchdowns and was a member of the 2016 team that won the FCS National Championship.

== Professional career ==
=== Orlando Apollos ===
After going unselected in the 2018 NFL draft and going unsigned as an undrafted free agent, Hyman was signed by the Orlando Apollos of the Alliance of American Football. Hyman caught four passes for 60 yards with Orlando before the AAF ceased operations.

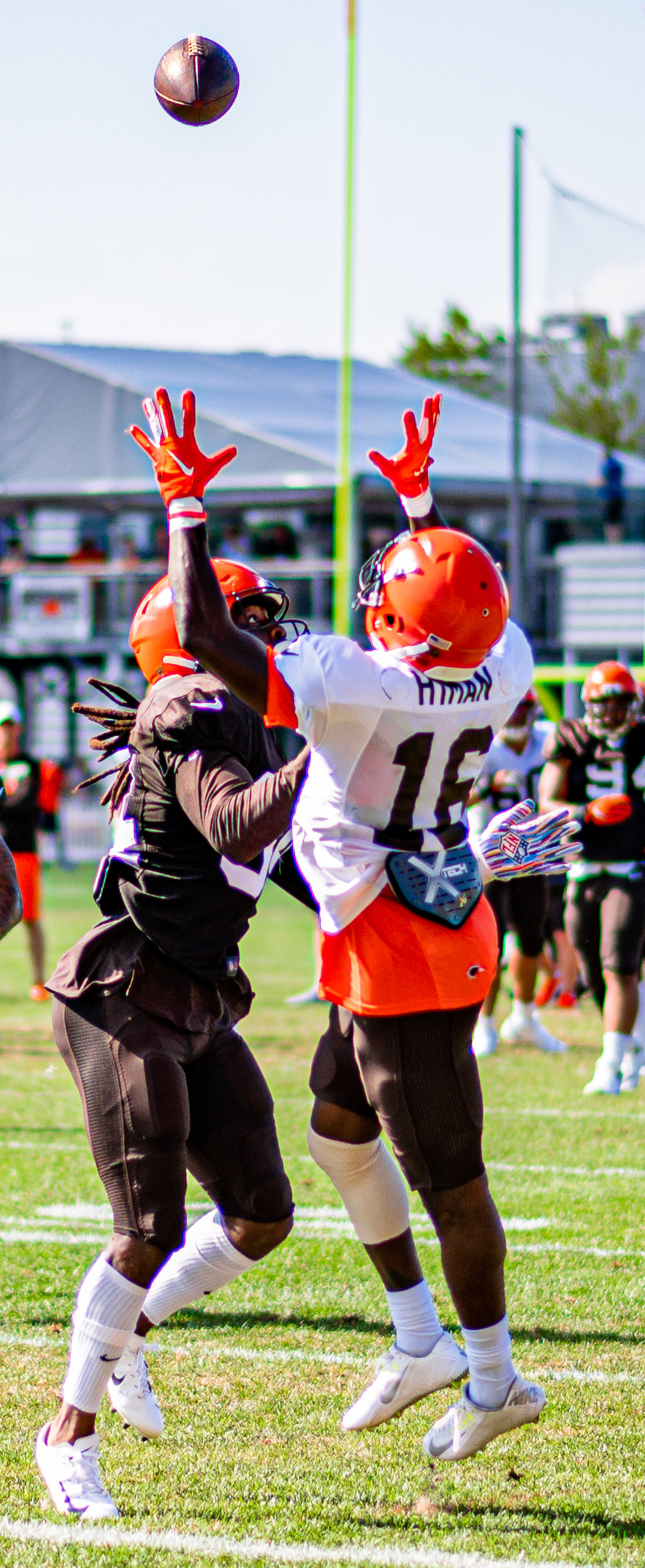
Hyman with the Cleveland Browns in 2019

=== Cleveland Browns ===
Hyman was signed by the Cleveland Browns on April 25, 2019. Hyman was waived by the Browns during final roster cuts on August 31, 2019.

=== Tampa Bay Buccaneers ===
Hyman was signed by the Tampa Bay Buccaneers' practice squad on September 24, 2019. He was released but was re-signed on October 16, 2019. The Buccaneers promoted Hyman to the active roster on December 10, 2019. He made his NFL debut on December 15, 2019, against the Detroit Lions, catching one pass for three yards in a 38–17 win. He was waived on December 24, 2019, and re-signed to the practice squad. Hyman finished the season with two receptions on four targets for 34 yards in two games played.

=== Carolina Panthers ===
On January 2, 2020, Hyman signed a reserve/future contract with the Carolina Panthers. He was waived on September 5, 2020, and signed to the practice squad the next day. He was placed on the practice squad/injured list on November 28. He was placed on the practice squad/COVID-19 list by the team on December 7, 2020, and moved back to the practice squad/injured list on December 22. He signed a reserve/future contract with the Panthers on January 4, 2021. He was waived on August 28, 2021.

=== Michigan Panthers (first stint) ===
Hyman signed with the Michigan Panthers of the United States Football League (USFL) on May 10, 2022, and was transferred to the team's inactive roster two days later.

=== Green Bay Packers ===
On July 28, 2022, Hyman signed with the Green Bay Packers. He was waived/injured on August 30, 2022, and placed on injured reserve. He was released on September 9.

=== Michigan Panthers (second stint) ===
On January 19, 2023, Hyman signed with the Panthers for his second stint with the team. He was waived in May 2023.

=== Pittsburgh Maulers ===
Hyman was claimed off waivers by the Pittsburgh Maulers on May 25, 2023. The Maulers folded when the XFL and USFL merged to create the United Football League (UFL).

=== Calgary Stampeders ===
On January 24, 2024, Hyman signed with the Calgary Stampeders of the Canadian Football League (CFL). He made the Stampeder practice roster in 2024 and managed to dress for 5 games. Hyman was released on May 27, 2025, during training camp.
