= Cole Murphy =

American football player (born 1996)

No. 16
- Position: Kicker

Personal information
- Born: April 12, 1996 (age 30); Burbank, California, U.S.
- Listed height: 6 ft 3 in (1.91 m)
- Listed weight: 215 lb (98 kg)

Career information
- College: Syracuse
- NFL draft: 2018: undrafted

Career history
- San Diego Fleet (2019)*; Arizona Cardinals (2019)*; Michigan Panthers (2022–2023)
- * Offseason or practice squad member only

Career USFL statistics
- Field goals made: 12
- Field goals attempted: 13
- Field goal %: 81.8

Cole Murphy (born April 12, 1996) is an American former football placekicker. Originally signed during week 5 of the 2022 USFL season, Murphy became one of the league's most consistent kickers. He played college football at Syracuse.

== Professional career ==
=== San Diego Fleet ===
Murphy went undrafted during the 2018 NFL draft, but signed with the San Diego Fleet of the Alliance of American Football for their 2019 season.

=== Arizona Cardinals ===
Murphy then signed with the Arizona Cardinals to their practice squad, but was released during preseason roster cuts.

=== Michigan Panthers ===
Murphy then spent the next two years away from football before being signed by the Michigan Panthers during the 2022 USFL season, where he remains as the Panthers' all-time leading scorer.

Murphy re-signed with the Panthers on September 7, 2023. On January 15, 2024, he was selected by the Panthers in the fourth round of the Super Draft portion of the 2024 UFL dispersal draft. He was released on March 10, 2024.
