= Mark Thompson (American football) =

American football player (born 1994)

No. 7, 44, 48
- Position: Running back

Personal information
- Born: December 9, 1994 (age 31); La Mott, Pennsylvania, U.S.
- Listed height: 6 ft 1 in (1.85 m)
- Listed weight: 240 lb (109 kg)

Career information
- High school: Cheltenham (Wyncote, Pennsylvania)
- College: Nassau (2013); Dodge City (2014–2015); Florida (2016–2017)
- NFL draft: 2018: undrafted

Career history
- Baltimore Ravens (2018)*; New York Jets (2018)*; Detroit Lions (2019)*; Baltimore Ravens (2019)*; Las Vegas Raiders (2020)*; Houston Gamblers / Roughnecks (2022–2024)
- * Offseason or practice squad member only

Awards and highlights
- USFL Offensive Player of the Year (2023); All-USFL Team (2023); USFL rushing touchdowns leader (2023)

Career USFL/UFL statistics
- Rush attempts: 315
- Rushing yards: 1,344
- Rushing touchdowns: 21
- Stats at Pro Football Reference

Mark Thompson (born December 9, 1994) is an American former professional football player who was a running back in the National Football League (NFL). He played college football at Dodge City and Florida, and signed with the Baltimore Ravens as an undrafted free agent in 2018. He was also a member of the New York Jets, Detroit Lions and Las Vegas Raiders in the NFL. Afterwards, he played two years in the United States Football League (USFL), and then one in the United Football League (UFL) with the Houston Gamblers / Roughnecks, being named the USFL Offensive Player of the Year and All-USFL in 2023 after leading the league in rushing touchdowns.

== Early life ==
Thompson was born on December 9, 1994, in La Mott, Pennsylvania. He attended Cheltenham High School and participated in football and track, but was not highly recruited. He graduated as part of the class of 2013, but was not able to participate in the graduation event due to an incident at school, which also kept him from playing in the senior football all-star game and the track district championships.

== College career ==
Thompson joined Nassau Community College in 2013 after graduating from Cheltenham, but thought it was not a good fit and transferred to Dodge City Community College in 2014 before ever appearing in a game. In his first year with the Dodge City Conquistadors, he totaled 460 rushing yards on 84 carries with eight touchdowns. The following season, Thompson became one of the best running backs in junior college football as he ran for 1,298 yards on 268 attempts with 18 scores, tied for the third-most in the NJCAA. He set Dodge City's all-time career touchdowns record, was named an All-American and was ranked the number one junior college recruit at running back. He received numerous Division I offers and chose to play for the Florida Gators.

Prior to the 2016 season, Thompson boldly predicted that he would rush for 1,000 yards by Florida's seventh game, against Georgia. By the time the Gators reached that game, Thompson had only rushed for 262 yards and two touchdowns, and he ended up missing the Georgia–Florida match after being suspended for marijuana possession. When he returned in their game against the South Carolina Gamecocks, he fumbled on his first carry. His ability to hold onto the football became a recurring issue during the season and he began holding one during his school classes to practice. Thompson's season ended on a high note, as he made an 85-yard receiving score during the Gators' Outback Bowl win over Iowa, setting the all-time record for longest catch in the game. He finished the year with 12 games played, four as a starter, and posted 68 carries for 299 yards with two rushing touchdowns.

Thompson had a slow start to his senior year, tallying just 33 rushes for 121 yards (an average of 3.7 yards-per-carry) through eight games, including two where he did not touch the ball once. After Randy Shannon became the interim head coach, Thompson began to see more action. In the final three games, he totaled 25 rush attempts for 176 yards, averaging more than seven yards-per-carry while scoring two of his three touchdowns on the year. He finished his senior season having appeared in all 11 games, while posting 58 carries for 297 yards (a 5.1 average), placing third on the team.

== Professional career ==
Pre-draft measurables
Height	Weight	Arm length	Hand span	40-yard dash	10-yard split	20-yard split	20-yard shuttle	Three-cone drill	Vertical jump	Broad jump	Bench press
6 ft 1 7/8 in (1.88 m)	232 lb (105 kg)	32 3/4 in (0.83 m)	9 5/8 in (0.24 m)	4.52 s	1.63 s	2.66 s	4.55 s	7.14 s	35.0 in (0.89 m)	9 ft 11 in (3.02 m)	16 reps
All values from Pro Day

=== National Football League ===
Prior to the 2018 NFL draft, Thompson worked out with the Atlanta Falcons. After going undrafted, he was signed by the Baltimore Ravens as an undrafted free agent on May 4, 2018. In preseason, he ran 31 times for 146 yards and caught 10 passes for 76 yards. He was released during final roster cuts before the start of the regular season. After having tryouts on September 4, September 5 and September 11, Thompson was re-signed by the Ravens to their practice squad on October 18, 2018. He was released from their practice squad on November 27, 2018.

Thompson was signed to the practice squad of the New York Jets on November 28, 2018, one day after being released by Baltimore. He became a free agent after the season. Thompson signed a reserve/future contract with the Detroit Lions at the conclusion of the 2018 season, on January 2, 2019. Despite scoring multiple touchdowns in preseason, he was released at the final roster cuts in 2019. Later, on September 10, 2019, Thompson was signed to the practice squad of the Ravens. He was placed on the practice squad/injured list on September 18, before being released on September 23, 2019.

In January 2020, Thompson was signed by the Las Vegas Raiders to a reserve/future contract. He was waived on April 28, 2020. He had a tryout with the Carolina Panthers in September, but was not signed.

=== Houston Gamblers / Roughnecks ===
==== 2022 ====
After being out of football for a year, Thompson was chosen in the 28th round (227th overall) of the 2022 USFL draft by the Houston Gamblers. He served as the Gamblers' main running back, appearing in nine games and starting seven while posting a team-leading 114 rush attempts for 463 yards (a 4.1 average) with two rushing touchdowns. He also scored two receiving touchdowns, which made him third on the team in total points scored (24, behind Isaiah Zuber and Nick Vogel). The Gamblers finished with a record of 3–7, placing last in their division.

==== 2023 ====
Thompson returned to the Gamblers for the 2023 season and became one of the best backs in the USFL. He appeared in eight games, seven as a starter, and carried the ball 135 times for 655 yards (a 4.9 average) while scoring a league-leading 14 touchdowns. His rushing touchdowns total set the spring football record for the 21st century. Thompson was named the USFL's offensive player of the week one time and finished with the second-highest total of rushing yards in the league, while also leading in rushing yards-per-game at 81.6. He was selected to the All-USFL team for his performance and was named the USFL Offensive Player of the Year.

On July 17, 2023, the New York Giants hosted Thompson for a workout.

Thompson became a free agent after the 2023 season and re-signed on December 24, 2023. Thompson and all other Houston Gamblers players and coaches were transferred to the Houston Roughnecks after it was announced that the Gamblers took on the identity of their XFL counterpart, the Roughnecks.

==== 2024 ====
Due to a knee sprain, Thompson missed the first three games of the season. In his first game back, against the Arlington Renegades, Thompson had nine carries for 34 yards and a touchdown, along with one reception for five yards in the 17–9 win. He ended up appearing in seven games, three as a starter for the 2024 Roughnecks, totaling 66 rushes for 226 yards (a 3.4 average) and five touchdowns. He was released on July 23, 2024.
