= Colby Wadman =

American football player (born 1995)

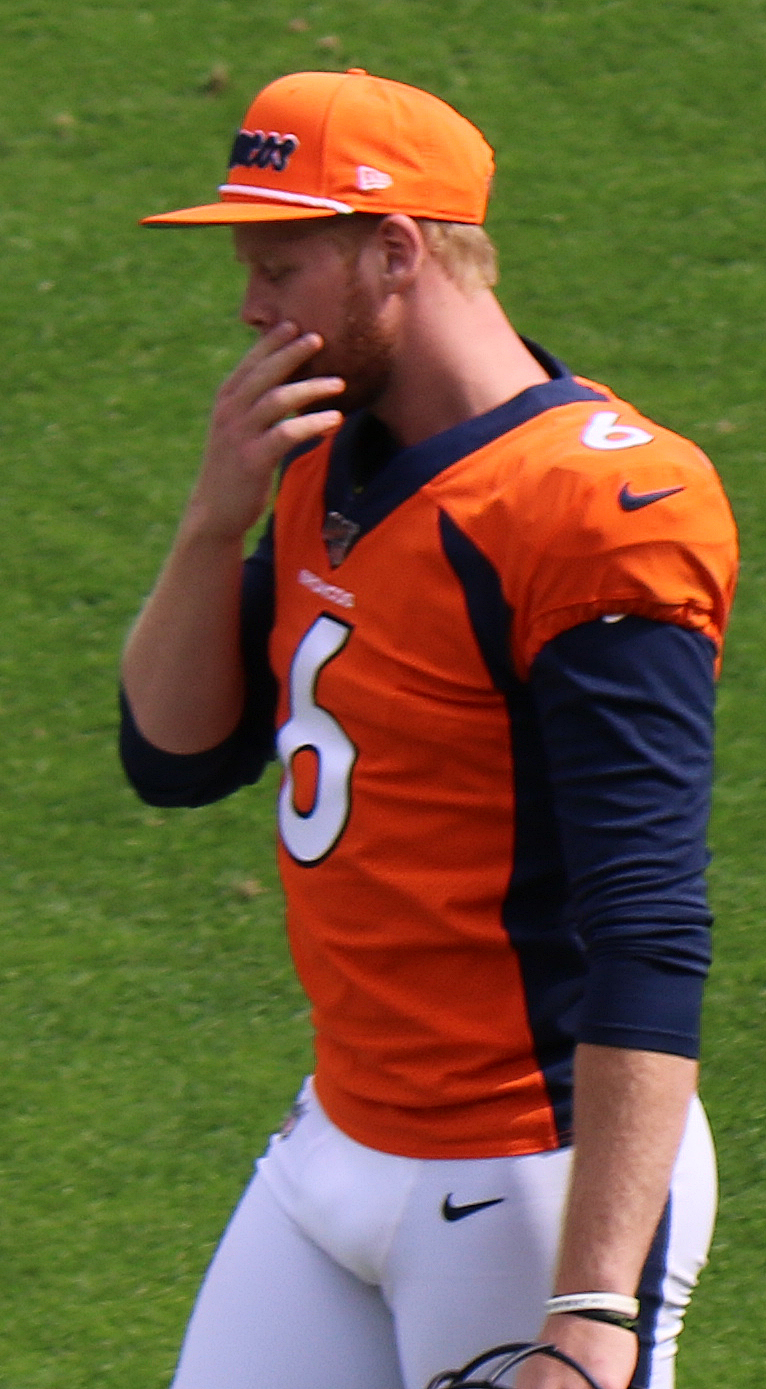
- Wadman with the Denver Broncos in 2019

Profile
- Position: Punter

Personal information
- Born: April 19, 1995 (age 31); Bangor, Maine, U.S.
- Listed height: 6 ft 1 in (1.85 m)
- Listed weight: 226 lb (103 kg)

Career information
- High school: Thousand Oaks (Thousand Oaks, California)
- College: UC Davis (2013–2016)
- NFL draft: 2017: undrafted

Career history
- Oakland Raiders (2018)*; Denver Broncos (2018–2019); San Francisco 49ers (2021)*; Birmingham Stallions (2022–2023); Washington Commanders (2023)*; Birmingham Stallions (2024–2026)
- * Offseason or practice squad member only

Awards and highlights
- UFL champion (2024); 2× USFL champion (2022, 2023); All-USFL Team (2023)

Career NFL statistics
- Punts: 143
- Punting yards: 6,369
- Average punt: 44.5
- Longest punt: 65
- Inside 20: 51
- Stats at Pro Football Reference

Colby Wadman (born April 19, 1995) is an American professional football punter. He played college football for the UC Davis Aggies.

== Early life ==
Wadman attended and played high school football at Thousand Oaks High School.

== College career ==
Wadman attended and played college football at the University of California, Davis.

=== Statistics ===
Year	G	Punts	Yds	Avg
2013	12	71	2,723	38.4
2014	11	54	2,282	42.3
2015	11	57	2,313	40.6
2016	11	62	2,677	43.2
Career	45	244	9,995	41

== Professional career ==
Pre-draft measurables
Height	Weight	Arm length	Hand span	Wingspan	Vertical jump	Broad jump
6 ft 0 7/8 in (1.85 m)	204 lb (93 kg)	32 in (0.81 m)	9 1/8 in (0.23 m)	6 ft 3 in (1.91 m)	30.0 in (0.76 m)	9 ft 2 in (2.79 m)
All values from Pro Day

=== Oakland Raiders ===
On March 16, 2018, Wadman signed with the Oakland Raiders. He was waived on May 11.

=== Denver Broncos ===
On September 26, 2018, Wadman was signed to the practice squad of the Denver Broncos. He was promoted to the active roster 10 days later, following an injury to Marquette King. In Week 5 of the 2018 season, Wadman made his NFL debut and had eight punts for 329 net yards in the loss to the New York Jets. Overall, in the 2018 season, Wadman finished with 65 punts for 2,905 net yards for a 44.69 average.

On April 23, 2020, Wadman was waived by the Broncos.

=== San Francisco 49ers ===
On December 29, 2021, Wadman was signed to the San Francisco 49ers practice squad. He was released five days later.

=== Birmingham Stallions (first stint) ===
Wadman was selected by the Birmingham Stallions of the United States Football League (USFL) in the 33rd round of the 2022 USFL draft. He re-signed with the team on July 20, 2023, but was released from his contract on August 7 to sign with an NFL team.

=== Washington Commanders ===
On August 8, 2023, Wadman signed with the Washington Commanders. He was released five days later.

=== Birmingham Stallions (second stint) ===
Wadman re-signed with the Stallions on September 25, 2023. He was released on April 30, 2024. He was re-signed on May 20, and again on August 16.
