= 2023 USFL season =

Second season of the USFL (2022)

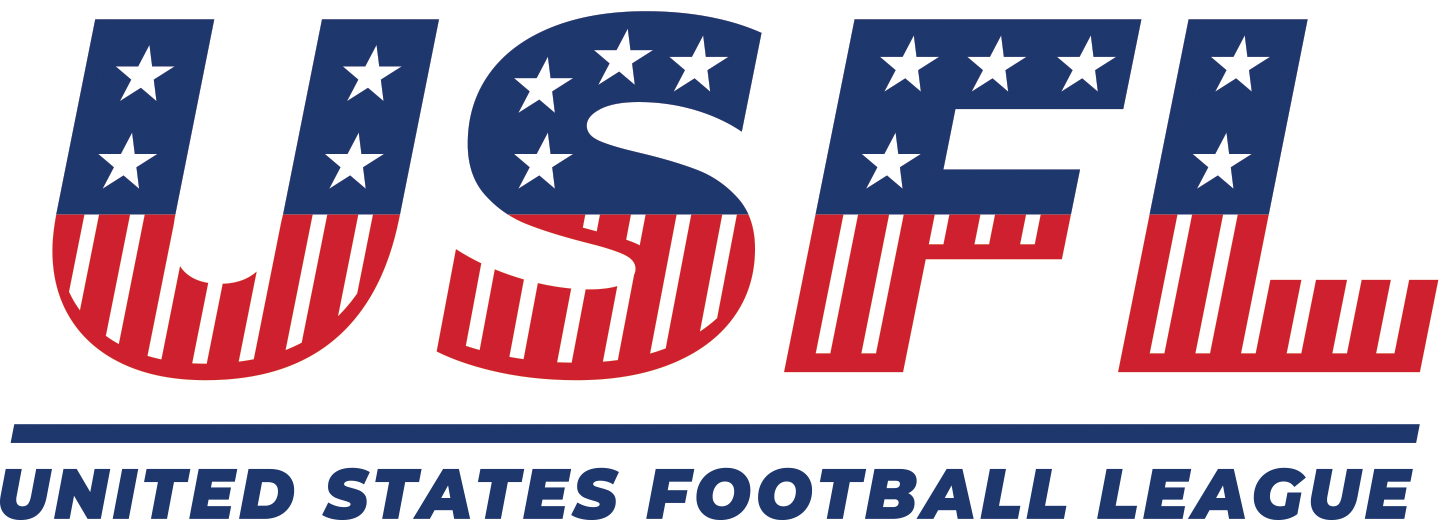
- League: United States Football League
- Sport: American football
- Duration: Regular season: April 15 – June 18; Playoffs: June 24 – July 1
- Games: 43 (40 regular-season games, 3 postseason games)
- Teams: 8
- TV partner(s): Fox, FS1, NBC, USA
- Streaming partner(s): Fox Sports app, Peacock
- Season MVP: Alex McGough
- North champions: Pittsburgh Maulers
- North runners-up: Michigan Panthers
- South champions: Birmingham Stallions
- South runners-up: New Orleans Breakers

2023 USFL Championship
- Venue: Tom Benson Hall of Fame Stadium, Canton, Ohio
- Champions: Birmingham Stallions
- Runners-up: Pittsburgh Maulers
- Finals MVP: Deon Cain

Seasons
- ← 2022 2024 →

The 2023 USFL season was the second season of the United States Football League. The regular season started on April 15 and ended on June 18. The postseason began on June 24 and ended with the 2023 USFL Championship Game on July 1. The league expanded the locations their teams play to four total stadiums, adding Ford Field in Detroit, Michigan, and Simmons Bank Liberty Stadium in Memphis, Tennessee.

With the league beginning its second season on April 15, the USFL became the first American spring league since the World League of American Football to complete its first season and return for a second. This ended up being the USFL's last season before it merged with the XFL to form the United Football League.

== Offseason ==
During the 2022 season, many were concerned about the hub model and attendance figures in Birmingham for non-Stallions games. While the league started strong with 17,500 fans in attendance for the first game, featuring the local Stallions vs New Jersey Generals, they did not release figures for the other 39 regular-season games, which appeared to be played in a mostly-empty stadium. The poor attendance and the league's inability to connect with fans in most of their city-named teams' markets was believed to hurt league image and credibility amongst casual and mainstream football fans.

On June 27, 2022, Fox Sports confirmed to Sports Business Journal that the USFL would return for another season in 2023, after a "profitable" first season, with an estimated annual revenue of $7.5 million. There would be no team expansion, and the league would continue to use a hub model. Both Fox and NBC were happy with the first season play quality, joint production and the viewership number, while acknowledge the sparse in-person attendance. The USFL promised to play 2023 season in two to four cities, and the USFL parent company, Fox, hired investment bank Allen & Company to find minority investors to help fund the league's expansion into local markets.

After the conclusion of the 2022 USFL co-founder, Brian Woods, has resigned from his role as the league CEO "for family reasons". It would later be revealed that he was launching a spring football league for high school players.

After the season the league saw ten of its coaches join XFL teams, while some players chose to leave the USFL and join the rival league, including All-USFL and Championship Game Most Valuable Player Victor Bolden and quarterback Luis Perez, who went on to become the XFL Championship Game MVP. Nevertheless, 180 players from the 2022 season were invited to NFL tryouts, while 69 players signed with NFL teams and 13 players finished the 2022 NFL season on active 53-man NFL rosters. 2022 season MVP KaVontae Turpin, who signed with Dallas Cowboys, finished the 2022 NFL season as a Pro Bowler. Another Dallas signee, former Birmingham Stallions place kicker Brandon Aubrey, set NFL records in 2023 for most consecutive field goals made to start a career and highest field goal percentage by a rookie in a single season.

== Locations ==
Map of venues used in the USFL
1 Protective Stadium (Birmingham AL)
2 Simmons Bank Liberty Stadium (Memphis TN)
3 Tom Benson Hall of Fame Stadium (Canton OH)
4 Ford Field (Detroit MI)

The league stated its intention to expand the locations in which teams play, from one (Birmingham, Alabama) in the previous season to two or four. In November 2022, the league announced an agreement with Birmingham to continue hosting two of the league's eight teams, the Stallions and the Breakers, at Protective Stadium.

On November 15, 2022, the league announced that it had secured an agreement to play games at Simmons Bank Liberty Stadium (formerly known as the Liberty Bowl) in Memphis, Tennessee.

The league contacted two stadiums in Michigan, Ford Field in Detroit and Rynearson Stadium in Ypsilanti, as potential locations for a North Division hub, with the Panthers as the host team. It was later revealed that Ford Field would be the home of the Michigan Panthers and Philadelphia Stars, while Rynearson Stadium would host the teams' practices.

On January 25, 2023, the league announced that the New Jersey Generals and the Pittsburgh Maulers (who sported a new gold-and-black uniform color scheme to emphasize the team's Pittsburgh identity) would play their home games at Tom Benson Hall of Fame Stadium in Canton, with the Generals as the host team. The stadium will also be the site of both the North Division playoff game and the 2023 USFL Championship Game, as it was in 2022.

== Teams ==
On November 15, 2022, in conjunction with its agreement to play at Simmons Bank Liberty Stadium, the USFL announced that the Memphis Showboats would be replacing the Tampa Bay Bandits for the 2023 season. The seven other teams in the league returned as they were in 2022.

Team	Head coach	Hub city	Home stadium
North Division
Michigan Panthers	Mike Nolan	Detroit, Michigan	Ford Field
Philadelphia Stars (Note: Week 2 game played in Canton)	Bart Andrus	Detroit, Michigan	Ford Field
New Jersey Generals	Mike Riley	Canton, Ohio	Tom Benson Hall of Fame Stadium
Pittsburgh Maulers	Ray Horton	Canton, Ohio	Tom Benson Hall of Fame Stadium
South Division
Birmingham Stallions	Skip Holtz	Birmingham, Alabama	Protective Stadium
New Orleans Breakers	John DeFilippo	Birmingham, Alabama	Protective Stadium
Houston Gamblers	Curtis Johnson	Memphis, Tennessee	Simmons Bank Liberty Stadium
Memphis Showboats	Todd Haley	Memphis, Tennessee	Simmons Bank Liberty Stadium

== Players ==
For the 2023 season, each USFL team started training camp with 58-men rosters, with a mandatory cut down to 54 and then a last cut down to 50. The final rosters are 40 active players and 10 inactive players on game days. The league also started a partnership with HUB Football for the 2023 season for players tryouts.

=== Compensation ===
On December 15, 2022, USFL player representatives (United Football Players Association and United Steelworkers) and the league parent company FOX Sports tentatively agreed on a new three-year collective bargaining agreement starting at the 2023 season, six months after the league players voted to unionize. The proposed agreement increases minimum salaries and provides a stronger benefits package than they previously received, and slightly higher than most XFL salaries. USFL players' minimum salaries will be $5,350 per week, up from the current $4,500 per week payout ($2,500 for inactive players) and $150 a week toward 401K contributions, while weekly performance bonuses will be cancelled. During training camp, all USFL players will get $850 a week. Continuing as a benefit from the 2022 season, USFL players and staff are still able to receive a college degree "tuition-free and debt-free", through a partnership with for-profit universities Strategic Education's Capella University and Strayer University.

=== Draft ===
The 10-round 2023 USFL College Draft took place on February 21, 2023, while draft pool included over 3,000 eligible players. The first overall pick was decided by the winner of the Week 10 game between the 1–8 Pittsburgh Maulers and 1–8 Michigan Panthers. The Panthers were victorious 33–21. The New Jersey Generals had their 1st round selection moved to the last pick in the draft and their rounds 2 to 5 picks were penalized due to "a violation of offseason roster management rules". Michigan State offensive lineman Jarrett Horst was the first overall pick.

=== Player movement ===
Transactions

- On January 27, it was reported that former NFL first-round pick linebacker Reuben Foster signed with the Pittsburgh Maulers.
- On February 8, the Showboats signed quarterback Ryan Willis after he was released from the XFL's St. Louis Battlehawks.
- On February 18, the Stars re-signed quarterback Case Cookus after a short stint with the NFL's Los Angeles Rams.
- On February 20, the Stars inked former NFL first-round pick, receiver Corey Coleman.
- On February 22, Grey Cup champion quarterback McLeod Bethel-Thompson announced he would leave the CFL and that he had signed with the New Orleans Breakers.
- On April 11, Birmingham Stallions sign tight end Thaddeus Moss, the son of Pro Football Hall of Fame wide receiver Randy Moss, and 2019 National Champion.
- On April 14, all teams finalized their mandatory 50-man rosters cut down.
- On April 19, Isaiah Zuber re-signed with the Houston Gamblers following a stint with the Las Vegas Raiders.
- On April 20, the Birmingham Stallions signed former New Orleans Breakers quarterback Kyle Sloter following an injury to J'Mar Smith.

== Coaching changes ==
On March 15, all teams announced their coaching staffs for the upcoming season.

Team	Departing coach	Incoming coach	Reason for leaving	Notes
Michigan Panthers	Jeff Fisher	Mike Nolan	Resigned	Fisher compiled a record of 2-8 (.200) in his lone season as head coach. His replacement was announced February 2, 2023, for what the league described as "personal reasons." Nolan, who had previously been head coach of the San Francisco 49ers from 2005 to 2008, had most recently been defensive coordinator for the Dallas Cowboys in 2020.
New Orleans Breakers	Larry Fedora	John DeFilippo	Resigned	Fedora compiled a record of 6–4 (.600) in his lone season as head coach, losing his lone playoff game. He resigned on September 15, 2022, stating he would not return to the USFL unless all of its teams played in their home markets. DeFilippo had spent the previous two seasons as quarterbacks coach of the Chicago Bears. This is his first head coaching position.
Pittsburgh Maulers	Kirby Wilson	Ray Horton	Resigned	Wilson compiled a record of 1-9 (.100) in his only season as head coach. His replacement was announced January 17, 2023, for what the league described as "personal reasons." Horton, who had been an NFL assistant coach from 1994 to 2019, is in his first head coaching position. His son Jarren Horton was the Maulers' defensive coordinator in 2022.
Houston Gamblers	Kevin Sumlin	Curtis Johnson	Resigned	Sumlin went 3–7 (.300) in his only season as the head coach for the Gamblers. He had already indicated his intentions to leave in fall 2022 but did not make it public nor official until accepting the associate head coach position for the Maryland Terrapins football team on February 14, 2023. Johnson won the 2001 national championship as the wide receivers coach with Miami as well as Super Bowl XLIV with the New Orleans Saints. Johnson also spent 4 seasons as the head coach of Tulane where he compiled a 15–33 record (.313).

== Rule changes ==
For the 2023 season, the league intends to change clock rules so every game will be played in a 180-minute window. Also, kickoffs will be from the 20-yard line and halftime is trimmed to 10 minutes, while the Championship Game will remain at 30 minutes.

== Standings ==
North Division
#		W	L	PCT	GB	DIV	PF	PA	STK
1	(y) Pittsburgh Maulers	4	6	.400	–	4–2	177	178	W2
2	(x) Michigan Panthers	4	6	.400	–	3–3	171	215	W1
3	(e) Philadelphia Stars	4	6	.400	–	2–4	220	258	L3
4	(e) New Jersey Generals	3	7	.300	1	3–3	187	212	L1
(x)–clinched playoff berth; (y)–clinched division; (e)–eliminated from playoff contention

South Division
#		W	L	PCT	GB	DIV	PF	PA	STK
1	(y) Birmingham Stallions	8	2	.800	–	4–2	287	196	W5
2	(x) New Orleans Breakers	7	3	.700	1	4–2	237	184	W3
3	(e) Houston Gamblers	5	5	.500	3	2–4	223	236	L2
4	(e) Memphis Showboats	5	5	.500	3	2–4	190	213	L2
(x)–clinched playoff berth; (y)–clinched division; (e)–eliminated from playoff contention

== Season structure ==
=== Preseason ===
Training camp started on March 21 in each team specific hub, a day later than what they had scheduled last year.

=== Regular season ===
The league announced that it would retain the previous season's scheduling format, with the regular season starting in April and ending in June and the playoffs extending to early July. The schedule was released on February 7, 2023.

=== Postseason ===
The postseason will be a four-team playoff, with the top 2 teams in each division making the postseason. On January 28, it was announced that the Tom Benson Hall of Fame Stadium in Canton, Ohio, will host the 2023 USFL Championship.

== Season schedule ==
All games produced by NBC Sports will stream on Peacock unless otherwise noted. Viewership figures for streaming platforms are released four weeks after the event, all times listed are in ET.

=== Week 1 ===
Week 1
Date	Time	Away team	Score	Home team	Stadium	Broadcast			Refs
Date	Time	Away team	Score	Home team	Stadium	Network	Viewership (millions)	Rating	Refs
April 15	4:30 p.m.	Philadelphia Stars	27–23	Memphis Showboats	Liberty Stadium	Fox	0.84	0.5	
April 15	7:30 p.m.	New Jersey Generals	10–27	Birmingham Stallions	Protective Stadium	Fox	0.86	0.5	
April 16	12:00 p.m.	Michigan Panthers	29–13	Houston Gamblers	Liberty Stadium	NBC	0.97	0.6	
April 16	6:30 p.m.	Pittsburgh Maulers	15–22	New Orleans Breakers	Protective Stadium	FS1	0.48	0.3	

=== Week 2 ===
Week 2
Date	Time	Away team	Score	Home team	Stadium	Broadcast			Refs
Date	Time	Away team	Score	Home team	Stadium	Network	Viewership (millions)	Rating	Refs
April 22	12:30 p.m.	Houston Gamblers	31–38	New Orleans Breakers	Protective Stadium	USA	0.13	0.1	
April 22	7:00 p.m.	Memphis Showboats	2–42	Birmingham Stallions	Protective Stadium	Fox	0.80	0.5	
April 23	1:00 p.m.	New Jersey Generals	20–3	Pittsburgh Maulers	Hall of Fame Stadium	NBC	0.73	0.5	
April 23	7:00 p.m.	Michigan Panthers	24–10	Philadelphia Stars	Hall of Fame Stadium	FS1	0.21	0.1	

=== Week 3 ===
Week 3
Date	Time	Away team	Score	Home team	Stadium	Broadcast			Refs
Date	Time	Away team	Score	Home team	Stadium	Network	Viewership (millions)	Rating	Refs
April 29	12:30 p.m.	New Orleans Breakers	45–31	Birmingham Stallions	Protective Stadium	USA	0.30	0.2	
April 29	7:00 p.m.	Memphis Showboats	26–30	Houston Gamblers	Liberty Stadium	Fox	0.78	0.5	
April 30	12:00 p.m.	Pittsburgh Maulers	21–13	Philadelphia Stars	Ford Field	NBC	0.76	0.5	
April 30	4:00 p.m.	New Jersey Generals	28–13	Michigan Panthers	Ford Field	Fox	0.56	0.4	

=== Week 4 ===
Week 4
Date	Time	Away team	Score	Home team	Stadium	Broadcast			Refs
Date	Time	Away team	Score	Home team	Stadium	Network	Viewership (millions)	Rating	Refs
May 6	1:00 p.m.	Houston Gamblers	41–16	Philadelphia Stars	Ford Field	Fox	0.52	0.3	
May 6	7:30 p.m.	Memphis Showboats	29–10	Michigan Panthers	Ford Field	NBC	2.06	1.1	
May 7	3:00 p.m.	New Orleans Breakers	20–17	New Jersey Generals	Hall of Fame Stadium	NBC (Note: NO–NJ game aired on Peacock for the first quarter due to NBC airing an MLB game going past its runtime.)	0.83	0.5	
May 7	6:30 p.m.	Birmingham Stallions	24–20	Pittsburgh Maulers	Hall of Fame Stadium	FS1	0.55	0.3	

=== Week 5 ===
Week 5
Date	Time	Away team	Score	Home team	Stadium	Broadcast			Refs
Date	Time	Away team	Score	Home team	Stadium	Network	Viewership (millions)	Rating	Refs
May 13	12:30 p.m.	Pittsburgh Maulers	23–7	Michigan Panthers	Ford Field	USA	0.26	0.2	
May 13	4:00 p.m.	Houston Gamblers	27–20	Birmingham Stallions	Protective Stadium	Fox	0.91	0.5	
May 14	12:00 p.m.	New Jersey Generals	21–24	Philadelphia Stars	Ford Field	NBC	0.76	0.5	
May 14	3:00 p.m.	Memphis Showboats	17–10	New Orleans Breakers	Protective Stadium	Fox	0.56	0.4	

=== Week 6 ===
Week 6
Date	Time	Away team	Score	Home team	Stadium	Broadcast			Refs
Date	Time	Away team	Score	Home team	Stadium	Network	Viewership (millions)	Rating	Refs
May 20	12:30 p.m.	Pittsburgh Maulers	0–22	Memphis Showboats	Liberty Stadium	USA	0.23	0.1	
May 20	4:00 p.m.	Birmingham Stallions	27–13	Michigan Panthers	Ford Field	Fox	0.73	0.5	
May 21	12:00 p.m.	New Orleans Breakers	10–16	Philadelphia Stars	Ford Field	FS1	0.22	0.1	
May 21	4:00 p.m.	New Jersey Generals	10–16	Houston Gamblers	Liberty Stadium	Fox	0.63	0.4	

=== Week 7 ===
Week 7
Date	Time	Away team	Score	Home team	Stadium	Broadcast			Refs
Date	Time	Away team	Score	Home team	Stadium	Network	Viewership (millions)	Rating	Refs
May 27	4:00 p.m.	Birmingham Stallions	24–20	New Orleans Breakers	Protective Stadium	Fox	0.70	0.4	
May 27	9:00 p.m.	Philadelphia Stars	37–31	Pittsburgh Maulers	Hall of Fame Stadium	FS1	0.16	0.1	
May 28	3:00 p.m.	Houston Gamblers	20–23	Memphis Showboats	Liberty Stadium	USA	0.25	0.1	
May 28	5:30 p.m.	Michigan Panthers	25–22	New Jersey Generals	Hall of Fame Stadium	FS1	0.27	0.2	

=== Week 8 ===
Week 8
Date	Time	Away team	Score	Home team	Stadium	Broadcast			Refs
Date	Time	Away team	Score	Home team	Stadium	Network	Viewership (millions)	Rating	Refs
June 3	12:00 p.m.	Houston Gamblers	20–19	Pittsburgh Maulers	Hall of Fame Stadium	USA	0.23	0.1	
June 3	3:00 p.m.	Philadelphia Stars	24–27	Birmingham Stallions	Protective Stadium	NBC	0.75	0.5	
June 4	1:00 p.m.	Memphis Showboats	25–16	New Jersey Generals	Hall of Fame Stadium	Fox	0.72	0.5	
June 4	4:00 p.m.	Michigan Panthers	20–24	New Orleans Breakers	Protective Stadium	Fox	0.78	0.5	

=== Week 9 ===
Week 9
Date	Time	Away team	Score	Home team	Stadium	Broadcast			Refs
Date	Time	Away team	Score	Home team	Stadium	Network	Viewership (millions)	Rating	Refs
June 10	12:00 p.m.	Michigan Panthers	7–19	Pittsburgh Maulers	Hall of Fame Stadium	Fox	0.70	0.4	
June 10	3:00 p.m.	New Orleans Breakers	31–3	Memphis Showboats	Liberty Stadium	CNBC (Note: Game originally scheduled for NBC but switched at 6:30 p.m. due to a weather delay. It would be resumed on CNBC.)	0.67	0.4	
June 11	1:00 p.m.	Birmingham Stallions	38–15	Houston Gamblers	Liberty Stadium	NBC (Note: Game originally scheduled for NBC at 2 p.m. ET but switched to 1 p.m. on Peacock due to possibility of severe weather in the area that caused delay of three hours the previous day. NBC joined the game in progress after the conclusion of the French Open Men's Final.)	0.67	0.4	
June 11	7:00 p.m.	Philadelphia Stars	33–37	New Jersey Generals	Hall of Fame Stadium	Fox	0.90	0.6	

=== Week 10 ===
Week 10
Date	Time	Away team	Score	Home team	Stadium	Broadcast			Refs
Date	Time	Away team	Score	Home team	Stadium	Network	Viewership (millions)	Rating	Refs
June 17	1:00 p.m.	Pittsburgh Maulers	26–6	New Jersey Generals	Hall of Fame Stadium	USA	0.24	0.1	
June 17	4:00 p.m.	Birmingham Stallions	27–20	Memphis Showboats	Liberty Stadium	Fox	0.64	0.4	
June 18	1:00 p.m.	New Orleans Breakers	17–10	Houston Gamblers	Liberty Stadium	FS1 (Note: Game originally scheduled for 4 p.m. ET but changed to 1 p.m. due to the possibility of severe weather in the area.)	0.17	0.1	
June 18	7:00 p.m.	Philadelphia Stars	20–23	Michigan Panthers	Ford Field	Fox	0.71	0.4	

=== Playoffs ===
The playoffs started on June 24 and 25 and ended with the championship game on July 1. The South Division championship was played at Protective Stadium and the North Division championship and championship game was played at Tom Benson Hall of Fame Stadium.

Division Finals; June 24–25, 2023
N1	Pittsburgh Maulers	31
N2	Michigan Panthers	27
S1	Birmingham Stallions	47
S2	New Orleans Breakers	22

USFL Championship; July 1, 2023
N1	Pittsburgh Maulers	12
S1	Birmingham Stallions	28

Division Finals
Date	Time	Away team	Score	Home team	Stadium	Broadcast			Refs
Date	Time	Away team	Score	Home team	Stadium	Network	Viewership (millions)	Rating	Refs
June 24	8:00 p.m.	Michigan Panthers	27–31 (OT)	Pittsburgh Maulers	Hall of Fame Stadium	NBC	0.96	0.6	
June 25	7:00 p.m.	New Orleans Breakers	22–47	Birmingham Stallions	Protective Stadium	Fox	0.85	0.5	

USFL Championship
Date	Time	Away team	Score	Home team	Stadium	Broadcast			Refs
Date	Time	Away team	Score	Home team	Stadium	Network	Viewership (millions)	Rating	Refs
July 1	8:00 p.m.	Pittsburgh Maulers	12–28	Birmingham Stallions	Hall of Fame Stadium	NBC	1.16	0.7	

== Awards ==
=== Players of the Week ===
The following Players of the Week were named the top performers during the 2023 season:

Week	Offensive Player of the Week	Defensive Player of the Week	Special Teams Player of the Week	Ref.
1	QB Josh Love (1) (Michigan Panthers)	DE Breeland Speaks (1) (Michigan Panthers)	K Matt Coghlin (New Orleans Breakers)	
2	QB Alex McGough (1) (Birmingham Stallions)	LB Frank Ginda (1) (Michigan Panthers)	KR Anthony Ratliff-Williams (Houston Gamblers)	
3	RB Wes Hills (New Orleans Breakers)	LB Reuben Foster (Pittsburgh Maulers)	K Chris Blewitt (Pittsburgh Maulers)	
4	RB Mark Thompson (Houston Gamblers)	LB Vontae Diggs (New Orleans Breakers)	KR Deon Cain (Birmingham Stallions)	
5	QB Troy Williams (Pittsburgh Maulers)	DE Breeland Speaks (2) (Michigan Panthers)	K Luis Aguilar (Philadelphia Stars)	
6	QB Alex McGough (2) (Birmingham Stallions)	LB Kyahva Tezino (Pittsburgh Maulers); LB Frank Ginda (2) (Michigan Panthers)	KR Derrick Dillon (Memphis Showboats)	
7	QB Josh Love (2) (Michigan Panthers)	LB Quentin Poling (Birmingham Stallions); DT John Atkins (Memphis Showboats)	KR Josh Simmons (Pittsburgh Maulers)	
8	WR Johnnie Dixon (New Orleans Breakers)	LB Frank Ginda (3) (Michigan Panthers)	K Alex Kessman (Memphis Showboats)	
9	RB Darius Victor (New Jersey Generals)	LB Quentin Poling (Birmingham Stallions)	KR Cam Echols-Luper (New Jersey Generals)	
10	QB Alex McGough (3) (Birmingham Stallions)	LB Frank Ginda (4) (Michigan Panthers)	KR Marcus Simms (Michigan Panthers)	

=== All-USFL Team ===
The following 28 players were selected by the league as "athletes who played consistently well over the course of the season".

==== Offense ====
Position	Player(s)
Quarterback	2 Alex McGough, Birmingham Stallions
Running back	7 Mark Thompson, Houston Gamblers; 31 Wes Hills, New Orleans Breakers
Wide receiver	1 Corey Coleman, Philadelphia Stars; 17 Justin Hall, Houston Gamblers
Tight end	12 Jace Sternberger, Birmingham Stallions
Offensive tackle	74 Avery Gennesy, Houston Gamblers; 77 Jarron Jones, Memphis Showboats
Guard	71 Calvin Ashley, New Jersey Generals; 77 Paul Adams, New Orleans Breakers
Center	68 Jake Lacina, New Jersey Generals

==== Defense ====
Position	Player(s)
Defensive end	57 Breeland Speaks, Michigan Panthers; 58 Adam Rodriguez, Philadelphia Stars
Defensive tackle	99 John Atkins, Memphis Showboats; 90 Toby Johnson, New Jersey Generals
Linebacker	5 Frank Ginda, Michigan Panthers; 31 Kyahva Tezino, Pittsburgh Maulers; 2 Chris Orr, New Jersey Generals
Cornerback	30 Mark Gilbert, Pittsburgh Maulers; 20 DJ Daniel, New Jersey Generals
Safety	2 Arnold Tarpley III, Pittsburgh Maulers; 22 Manny Bunch, Houston Gamblers

==== Special teams ====
Position	Player(s)
Kicker	15 Luis Aguilar, Philadelphia Stars
Punter	15 Colby Wadman, Birmingham Stallions
Kickoff returner	38 Josh Simmons, Pittsburgh Maulers
Punt returner	17 Isiah Hennie, Pittsburgh Maulers
Long Snapper	41 Ryan Langan, Birmingham Stallions
Special teamer	13 Vinny Papale, Memphis Showboats

=== Regular season ===
Most Valuable Player of the Year	Offensive Player of the Year	Defensive Player of the Year	Special Teams Player of the Year	Coach of the Year	Assistant Coach of the Year	Sportsman of the Year	Ref.
Alex McGough (QB) (Birmingham Stallions)	Mark Thompson (RB) (Houston Gamblers)	Frank Ginda (LB) (Michigan Panthers	Derrick Dillon (KR) (Memphis Showboats)	Skip Holtz (Birmingham Stallions)	Jarren Horton (Pittsburgh Maulers)	Ethan Westbrooks (DE) (Michigan Panthers)	

== Statistical leaders ==
2023 USFL statistical leaders
Category		Player	Team	Stat
Offense
Passing	Yards	McLeod Bethel-Thompson	New Orleans Breakers	2,433
Passing	Touchdowns	Alex McGough	Birmingham Stallions	20
Passing	Interceptions	Josh Love	Michigan Panthers	10
Rushing	Yards	Wes Hills	New Orleans Breakers	679
Rushing	Touchdowns	Mark Thompson	Houston Gamblers	14
Receiving	Yards	Corey Coleman	Philadelphia Stars	669
Receiving	Receptions	Corey Coleman	Philadelphia Stars	51
Receiving	Touchdowns	Jace Sternberger	Birmingham Stallions	7
Defense
Tackles		Frank Ginda	Michigan Panthers	104
Sacks		Breeland Speaks	Michigan Panthers	9.0
Interceptions		Mark Gilbert	Pittsburgh Maulers	4
Passes Defensed		Mark Gilbert	Pittsburgh Maulers	15
Special teams
Return yards	Kick	Josh Simmons	Pittsburgh Maulers	862
Return yards	Punt	Isiah Hennie	Pittsburgh Maulers	297
Field goals	Made	Luis Aguilar	Philadelphia Stars	25
Field goals	Percentage	Matt Coghlin	New Orleans Breakers	95%
Punting	Yards	Matt Mengel	Pittsburgh Maulers	1,675
Punting	Average	Colby Wadman	Birmingham Stallions	41.1

== League finances ==
After the 2022 season, Fox Sports had hired investment bank Allen & Company to find minority investors to help fund the league's expansion into local markets, with a plan to raise between $150 million and $200 million.

For the 2023 regular season ticket prices ranged from $25 to $120.

=== Business partnerships ===
In April 13, the league with Blockchain Creative Labs (BCL), FOX's Web3 media and creative technology company launched an all-new fans loyalty program. In April 14, Upper Deck Announced as the exclusive trading card partner and Antigua Apparel named an "Authentic Sideline Apparel Partner Of The USFL".

Other USFL's sponsors include: FedEx, Gatorade, Henry Schein, Jersey Mike's Subs, Mars, Molson Coors, Rocket Mortgage, T-Mobile and Wendy's.

== Media ==
This was the second year of the three-year rights deal agreement between NBC Sports along with Fox Sports (Fox doesn't have to pay a rights fee due to being one of the owners of the league).

Telecasts for the 2023 season will air on Fox, FS1, NBC, USA Network and CNBC. Fox aired 17 regular season games and 1 semi-final, NBC broadcast 7 full regular season games plus the first quarter of 1 game on June 10 then the remaining 2 hours of another game on June 11 (originally scheduled to air 9 full games), 1 semi-final and the Championship game this season (rotated annually with Fox on a two-year rotation), and FS1 and USA Network broadcast 7 games each, and CNBC broadcast the remaining one of the games on NBC caused by a weather delay on June 10. Unlike the 2022 season, in order to increase the leagues exposure, Peacock will not air exclusive games (however it aired an hour of exclusive game coverage on Sunday June 11). Instead, Peacock will simply simulcast all games produced by NBC Sports. An emphasis will also be made on having high-profile events serve as lead-ins to the league, with some games following NASCAR and Major League Baseball broadcasts on Fox or the Kentucky Derby on NBC.

Curt Menefee and Joel Klatt will return as Fox's lead commentary team for USFL coverage. Kevin Kugler and Mark Sanchez serve as the second broadcast team. Brock Huard will report from the sidelines during selected games. Devin Gardner will also appear on select games.

The NBC crew features Jac Collinsworth and Paul Burmeister handling play-by-play duties alongside analysts Jason Garrett, Michael Robinson and Cameron Jordan. Zora Stephenson, Corey Robinson, Lewis Johnson, and Caroline Pineda are the sideline reporters. Colt McCoy, Kyle Rudolph and Anthony Herron are the additional analysts for selected games.

=== Viewership ===
In millions of viewers

Broadcaster	1	2	3	4	5	6	7	8	9	10	Division finals	Championship game	Total	Average
Fox	0.8	0.8	0.8	0.5	0.9	0.7	0.7	0.7	0.7	0.6	0.8	–	13.1	0.7
Fox	0.9	–	0.6	–	0.6	0.6	–	0.8	0.9	0.7	–	–	13.1	0.7
FS1	0.5	0.2	–	0.6	–	0.2	0.2	–	–	0.2	–	–	2.2	0.3
FS1	–	–	–	–	–	–	0.3	–	–	–	–	–	2.2	0.3
NBC	1.0	0.7	0.8	2.1	0.8	–	–	0.8	0.7	–	0.9	1.2	9.8	1.0
NBC	–	–	–	0.8	–	–	–	–	–	–	–	–	9.8	1.0
USA	–	0.1	0.3	–	0.3	0.2	0.3	0.2	–	0.2	–	–	1.6	0.2
CNBC	–	–	–	–	–	–	–	–	0.5	–	–	–	0.5	0.5
Total	3.2	1.8	2.5	4.0	2.6	1.7	1.5	2.5	2.8	1.7	1.7	1.2	27.2	
Average	0.8	0.5	0.6	1.0	0.7	0.4	0.4	0.6	0.7	0.4	0.9	1.2		0.6

* One decimal place is shown in table but three decimal places are used in all calculations.
* Viewership figures for games streaming on Peacock were not released.

=== International broadcasters ===
NBC Sports, FOX Sports and DAZN will broadcast live international coverage of the 14-game schedule, including the playoffs and the championship game (excludes coverage in the U.S. and the 14 countries with separate broadcast deal). In the United Kingdom and Ireland it will be broadcast through Sky Sports, in Australia by FOX Sports Australia, in Denmark, Estonia, Finland, Iceland, Latvia, Lithuania, Norway, Poland and Sweden by Viaplay in Hungary by Network 4 and in the Philippines by Elite.

Games involving the Michigan Panthers have been broadcast by radio station WJR, which covers a substantial portion of the midwestern United States and Southern Ontario in Canada with a 50,000-watt signal. WKIM carried the Memphis Showboats.

== Reception ==
The USFL open the season strong with between 15,000 and 20,000 fans in Memphis and ~17,000 in Birmingham. Alas, the league second return to play was also marked with the same complaints from the previous season of a lack of fans in the stands in other locations (5,000-8,000 fans in Canton for week 1 and approximately 7,500 fans in the Panthers opener) or "neutral site games", while the league announced "it will be maintaining their policy in partnership with their venues of not releasing attendance figures" during the season. It was later reveled that most "neutral site games" had between 800 and 900 fans in the stands. President of Football Operations Daryl Johnston acknowledged the issue before the championship game and said: "it does motivate us to make sure we get our eight teams into their home markets as quickly as we can, but we can't rush it". After the USFL merged with the XFL, Johnston would acknowledge that the league lacked the raucous fan environments present in the XFL's markets, especially the St. Louis Battlehawks, and that this had had a negative impact on the USFL's players. He also noted that the Showboats' attendance had dropped substantially over the course of the 2023 season, a trend that continued into 2024, concerning him.

Before the season, some fans felt disrespected of the USFL commercials to promote the league's return, which took aim at the XFL. Nonetheless, the USFL week 1 ratings outdraws XFL Week 9, as the USFL averaged 789,500 viewers across four games with the XFL posting an averaged of 588,250 viewers across four games, although three USFL games were on broadcast TV while three XFL games were on cable. USFL average viewership in 2023 was down 16% from its debut season to 601,000 and 3% lower than the XFL's 2023 season, despite having 28 over the air network games compare to the XFL's eight. Johnston himself expressed disappointment and anger that the USFL was comparable to the XFL in ratings for the 2023 season, dismissing the XFL as "no competition" to the "far superior" USFL and questioning how "to be on par with our competition from a ratings standpoint in Year 2, I'm still trying to figure out: How did that happen? (...) they're not even close."

Contrary to the 2022 season, most markets decided to cover the teams locally, while the third week of games received tentative praise from national outlet, with Bill Shea of The Athletic writing an article titled "I attended a USFL game so you don't have to (but maybe you should?)" after attending a game between Michigan Panthers and New Jersey Generals.

The league approach to adopt technology was praised, especially for the use of first down measurements technology.

== Signees to the NFL ==
The following list features players who signed with NFL teams during the 2023 NFL season following their involvement with the USFL in 2023:

Legend
	Made an NFL team (active, practice squad or PUP)
**Bold**	Made the active roster

Player	Position	USFL team	NFL team(s)	Ref.
**Brandon Aubrey**	K	Birmingham Stallions	Dallas Cowboys	
**Josh Pederson**	TE	Houston Gamblers	Jacksonville Jaguars	
Alex McGough	QB	Birmingham Stallions	Green Bay Packers	
Austin Watkins	WR	Birmingham Stallions	Cleveland Browns/Philadelphia Eagles	
Davion Davis	WR	Birmingham Stallions	Arizona Cardinals/Houston Texans/Washington Commanders	
Jace Sternberger	TE	Birmingham Stallions	Buffalo Bills	
Deon Cain	WR	Birmingham Stallions	Philadelphia Eagles	
**Kaden Davis**	WR	Michigan Panthers	Arizona Cardinals/Cleveland Browns	
Levi Bell	DE	Michigan Panthers	Seattle Seahawks	
**Josh Butler**	DB	Michigan Panthers	Dallas Cowboys	
Kyahva Tezino	LB	Pittsburgh Maulers	San Francisco 49ers	
Trey Quinn	WR	Michigan Panthers	Detroit Lions	
Lorenzo Burns	CB	Birmingham Stallions	Cleveland Browns	
**LaBryan Ray**	DT	Philadelphia Stars	Carolina Panthers	
Cole Schneider	C	Birmingham Stallions	Green Bay Packers	
La'Michael Pettway	TE	Birmingham Stallions	Indianapolis Colts/New England Patriots	
Daniel Helm	TE	Memphis Showboats	Detroit Lions	
Mark Gilbert	CB	Pittsburgh Maulers	Miami Dolphins	
**Khalil Davis**	DT	Birmingham Stallions	Houston Texans	
Jordan Ferguson	OLB	Memphis Showboats	Seattle Seahawks	
Colby Wadman	P	Birmingham Stallions	Washington Commanders	
Matt Kaskey	OT	Birmingham Stallions	Los Angeles Chargers	
Stevie Scott	RB	Michigan Panthers	Arizona Cardinals	
Breeland Speaks	DE	Michigan Panthers	San Francisco 49ers	
Nate Brooks	CB	Birmingham Stallions	San Francisco 49ers	
C. J. Marable	RB	Birmingham Stallions	New England Patriots	
Micah Vanterpool	OL	New Jersey Generals	New England Patriots	
Frank Ginda	LB	Michigan Panthers	Atlanta Falcons	
E.J. Perry	QB	Michigan Panthers	Houston Texans/Jacksonville Jaguars	
Olive Sagapolu	DT	Pittsburgh Maulers	Philadelphia Eagles	
Nevelle Clarke	CB	New Orleans Breakers	Pittsburgh Steelers	
Matt Hankins	CB	Birmingham Stallions	Los Angeles Chargers	
Aaron Shampklin	RB	Houston Gamblers	Los Angeles Chargers/Pittsburgh Steelers	
Isaiah Zuber	WR	Houston Gamblers	Las Vegas Raiders	
Nehemiah Shelton	CB	Memphis Showboats	New York Jets	
Braylon Jones	C	Houston Gamblers	Arizona Cardinals	
**D. J. Montgomery**	WR	Michigan Panthers	Indianapolis Colts	
DaShaun White	LB	Michigan Panthers	Buffalo Bills	
Cohl Cabral	C	Birmingham Stallions	Arizona Cardinals	
Devin Ross	WR	Michigan Panthers	Las Vegas Raiders	
Brandon Wright	P	Memphis Showboats	Los Angeles Rams	
Arnold Tarpley	S	Pittsburgh Maulers	Atlanta Falcons	

== See also ==
- 2023 XFL season
