= Kyahva Tezino =

American gridiron football player (born 1997)

Ottawa Redblacks
- Position: Linebacker
- Roster status: Active

Personal information
- Born: June 21, 1997 (age 29); Los Angeles, California, U.S.
- Listed height: 6 ft 0 in (1.83 m)
- Listed weight: 224 lb (102 kg)

Career information
- High school: Salesian (Los Angeles, California)
- College: San Diego State (2015–2019)
- NFL draft: 2020: undrafted

Career history
- New England Patriots (2020)*; Carolina Panthers (2020)*; Pittsburgh Maulers (2022–2023); San Francisco 49ers (2023)*; Birmingham Stallions (2024); Pittsburgh Steelers (2024)*; Birmingham Stallions (2025–present); Winnipeg Blue Bombers (2026)*; Ottawa Redblacks (2026–present)
- * Offseason or practice squad member only

Awards and highlights
- UFL champion (2024); All-UFL Team (2026); All-USFL Team (2023); USFL solo tackles leader (2023)

Kyahva Tezino (born June 21, 1997) is an American professional football linebacker for the Ottawa Redblacks of the Canadian Football League (CFL). He played college football for the San Diego State Aztecs. He also played for the New England Patriots, Carolina Panthers, San Francisco 49ers, and Pittsburgh Steelers of the National Football League (NFL), and the Pittsburgh Maulers and of the United States Football League (USFL) and the Birmingham Stallions of the United Football League (UFL).

== Early life ==
Tezino was born on June 21, 1997, in Los Angeles. Growing up with a single mother, he began playing football at age five. Tezino attended Bishop Mora Salesian High School, where he led the football team in tackles in all three of his varsity seasons. He was rated as a four-star recruit and received numerous scholarship offers, initially committing to play college football at Washington State before switching his commitment to San Diego State.

== College career ==
Tezino played four season at San Diego State, where recorded 290 total tackles tackles and 15.5 sacks in 48 career games played. He was a two-time first-team all-Mountain West Conference honoree and became one of only six players in Aztec history to earn multiple team MVP awards.

== Professional career ==
Pre-draft measurables
Height	Weight	Arm length	Hand span	Wingspan
6 ft 0 in (1.83 m)	235 lb (107 kg)	30 1/4 in (0.77 m)	8 1/2 in (0.22 m)	6 ft 1 5/8 in (1.87 m)
All values from Pro Day

=== New England Patriots ===
After going undrafted in the 2020 NFL draft, Tezino signed with the New England Patriots of the National Football League (NFL) on May 26, 2020. He was released on July 26, 2020.

=== Carolina Panthers ===
On July 27, 2020, Tezino was selected by the Carolina Panthers of the National Football League (NFL). He was released on August 15, 2020.

=== Pittsburgh Maulers ===
On February 24, 2022, Brown was selected by the Pittsburgh Maulers of the United States Football League (USFL). On June 26, 2024, Tezino was named to the 2023 All-USFL team.

=== San Francisco 49ers ===
On July 27, 2023, Tezino signed with the San Francisco 49ers of the National Football League (NFL). He was released on August 29, 2023.

=== Birmingham Stallions (first stint) ===
On January 10, 2024, Tezino signed with the Birmingham Stallions of the United Football League (UFL). On June 16, 2024, Tezino and the Stallions won the 2024 UFL Championship.

=== Pittsburgh Steelers ===
On August 19, 2024, Tezino signed with the Pittsburgh Steelers of the National Football League (NFL). He was released a week later on August 26.

=== Birmingham Stallions (second stint) ===
On January 22, 2025, Tezino re-signed with the Stallions.

=== Winnipeg Blue Bombers ===
On August 23, 2026, Tezino signed with the Winnipeg Blue Bombers of the Canadian Football League (CFL) to a practice roster agreement.

=== Ottawa Redblacks ===
On September 2, 2026, Tezino was traded to the Ottawa Redblacks.
