= Breeland Speaks =

American football player and coach (born 1995)

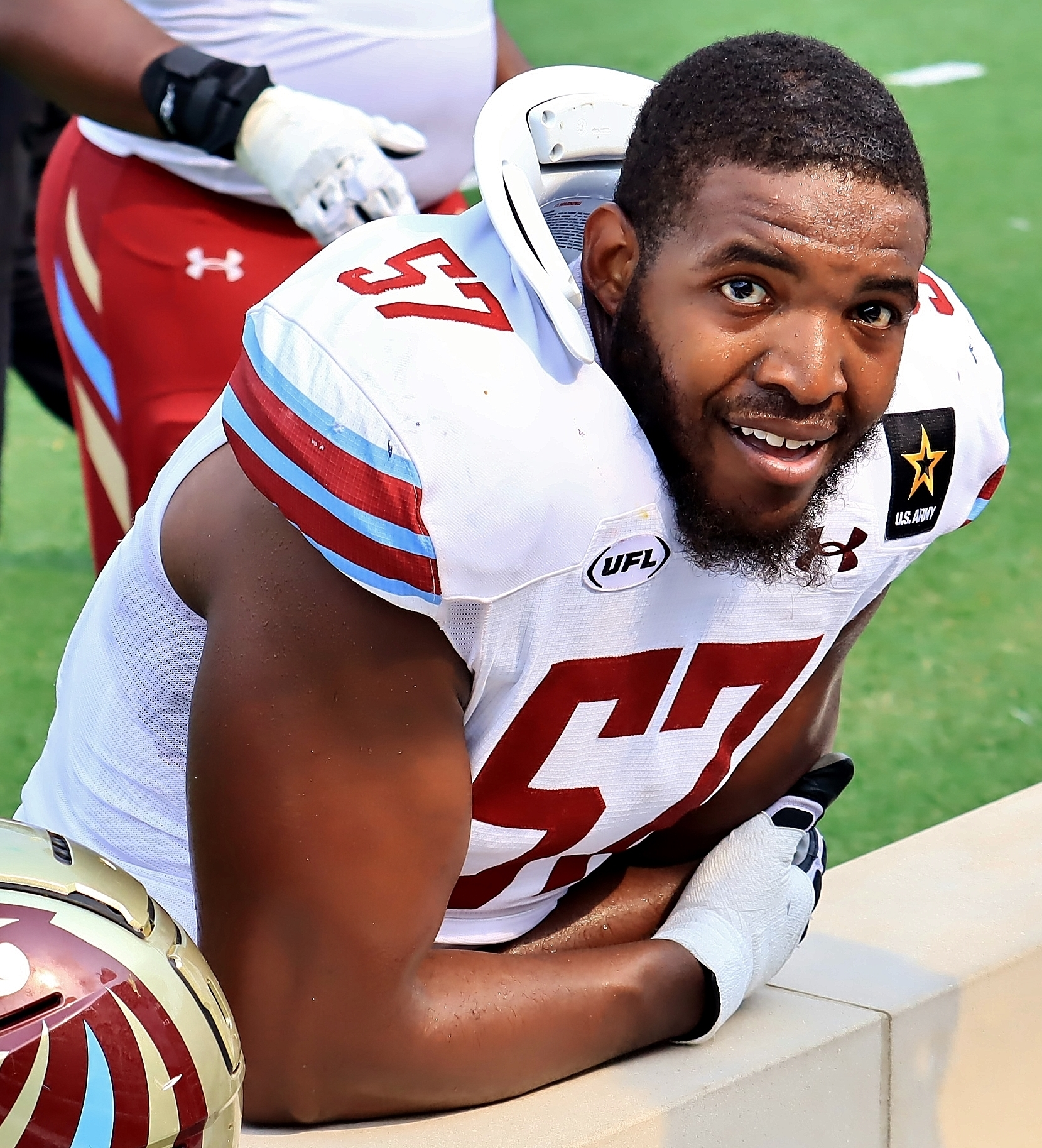
- Speaks with the Michigan Panthers in 2022

Jackson State Tigers
- Title: Defensive assistant

Personal information
- Born: December 18, 1995 (age 30); Jackson, Mississippi, U.S.
- Listed height: 6 ft 3 in (1.91 m)
- Listed weight: 285 lb (129 kg)

Career information
- High school: Callaway (Jackson)
- College: Ole Miss
- NFL draft: 2018: 2nd round, 46th overall pick

Career history

Playing
- Kansas City Chiefs (2018–2019); Las Vegas Raiders (2020)*; Dallas Cowboys (2020)*; New York Giants (2021)*; Dallas Cowboys (2021)*; Buffalo Bills (2021)*; Michigan Panthers (2023); San Francisco 49ers (2023)*; Michigan Panthers (2024); Jacksonville Jaguars (2024)*; Michigan Panthers (2025)
- * Offseason or practice squad member only

Coaching
- Jackson State (2025–present) Defensive assistant

Awards and highlights
- Super Bowl champion (LIV); UFL Defensive Player of the Year (2024); All-UFL Team (2024); UFL sack leader (2024); All-USFL Team (2023); USFL sacks leader (2023); Second-team All-SEC (2017)

Career NFL statistics
- Total tackles: 24
- Sacks: 1.5
- Forced fumbles: 1
- Fumble recoveries: 2
- Stats at Pro Football Reference

Breeland Clyde Speaks (born December 18, 1995) is an American former professional football player who was a defensive end in the National Football League (NFL). He currently serves as a defensive assistant for the Jackson State Tigers. He was selected by the Kansas City Chiefs in the second round of the 2018 NFL draft. He played college football for the Ole Miss Rebels.

== Early life ==
Speaks attended Callaway High School in Jackson, Mississippi. During his senior season in 2013, Speaks had 118 tackles, 26.5 tackles for loss, nine sacks, 18 quarterback hurries, four forced fumbles, three blocked kicks, five pass breakups and an interception returned for a touchdown. A consensus 4-star recruit, Speaks committed to play college football for the Ole Miss Rebels in October 2013, choosing them over Mississippi State, Arkansas and Florida State among others.

== College career ==
Speaks redshirted in the 2014 season. As a redshirt freshman in 2015, Speaks played in every game of the season, starting two. He totaled 32 tackles, 5.5 tackles for loss, one sack and one fumble recovery.

In 2016, as a redshirt sophomore, Speaks had 28 tackles (11 solo), 1.5 tackles for loss and one sack.

As a redshirt junior in 2017, Speaks totaled 67 tackles, eight tackles for loss and seven sacks. He was named to the Associated Press All-Southeastern Conference Second-team. After the season, he declared for the 2018 NFL draft.

== Professional career ==
Pre-draft measurables
Height	Weight	Arm length	Hand span	Wingspan	40-yard dash	10-yard split	20-yard split	20-yard shuttle	Three-cone drill	Vertical jump	Broad jump
6 ft 2 7/8 in (1.90 m)	283 lb (128 kg)	33 3/4 in (0.86 m)	9 7/8 in (0.25 m)	6 ft 7 5/8 in (2.02 m)	4.87 s	1.65 s	2.79 s	4.65 s	7.63 s	32.5 in (0.83 m)	9 ft 2 in (2.79 m)
All values from NFL Combine

=== Kansas City Chiefs ===
Speaks was selected by the Kansas City Chiefs in the second round (46th overall) of the 2018 NFL draft. He played in all 16 games as a rookie with four starts, recording 24 tackles and 1.5 sacks.

On August 31, 2019, Speaks was placed on injured reserve. On December 6, while on injured reserve, he was suspended four games for violating the NFL's substance-abuse policy. Speaks was reinstated from suspension on December 30, and placed back on the injured reserve list. Without Speaks, the Chiefs won Super Bowl LIV against the San Francisco 49ers.

Speaks was waived during final roster cuts on September 5, 2020.

=== Las Vegas Raiders ===
On October 2, 2020, Speaks was signed to the practice squad of the Las Vegas Raiders. He was released by the Raiders on November 3.

=== Dallas Cowboys (first stint) ===
On November 17, 2020, Speaks was signed to the Dallas Cowboys' practice squad. His practice squad contract with the team expired after the season on January 11, 2021.

=== New York Giants ===
On January 21, 2021, Speaks signed a reserve/futures contract with the New York Giants. He was waived by the Giants on May 13.

=== Dallas Cowboys (second stint) ===
On September 1, 2021, Speaks was signed to the Dallas Cowboys' practice squad. He was released by the Cowboys on December 6.

=== Buffalo Bills ===
On December 22, 2021, Speaks was signed to the Buffalo Bills' practice squad, but was released five days later.

=== Michigan Panthers (first stint) ===
On December 22, 2022, Speaks signed with the Michigan Panthers of the United States Football League (USFL). In his Panthers debut, Speaks produced three sacks, seven combined tackles, and one forced fumble. He was released from his contract on August 10, 2023, to sign with an NFL team.

=== San Francisco 49ers ===
Speaks signed with the San Francisco 49ers on a one-year contract on August 11, 2023. He was waived by San Francisco on August 27.

=== Michigan Panthers (second stint) ===
On December 19, 2023, Speaks re-signed with the Panthers. He was named the UFL Defensive Player of the Year on June 7, 2024. Speaks' contract was terminated on August 8.

=== Jacksonville Jaguars ===
On August 8, 2024, Speaks signed with the Jacksonville Jaguars. He was waived by Jacksonville on August 25.

=== Michigan Panthers (third stint) ===
On February 2, 2025, Speaks re-signed with the Michigan Panthers. On April 7, Speaks was placed on injured reserve. He was activated on May 19.

On June 30, 2026, Speaks announced his retirement from professional football.
