= Frank Ginda =

American football player (born 1997)

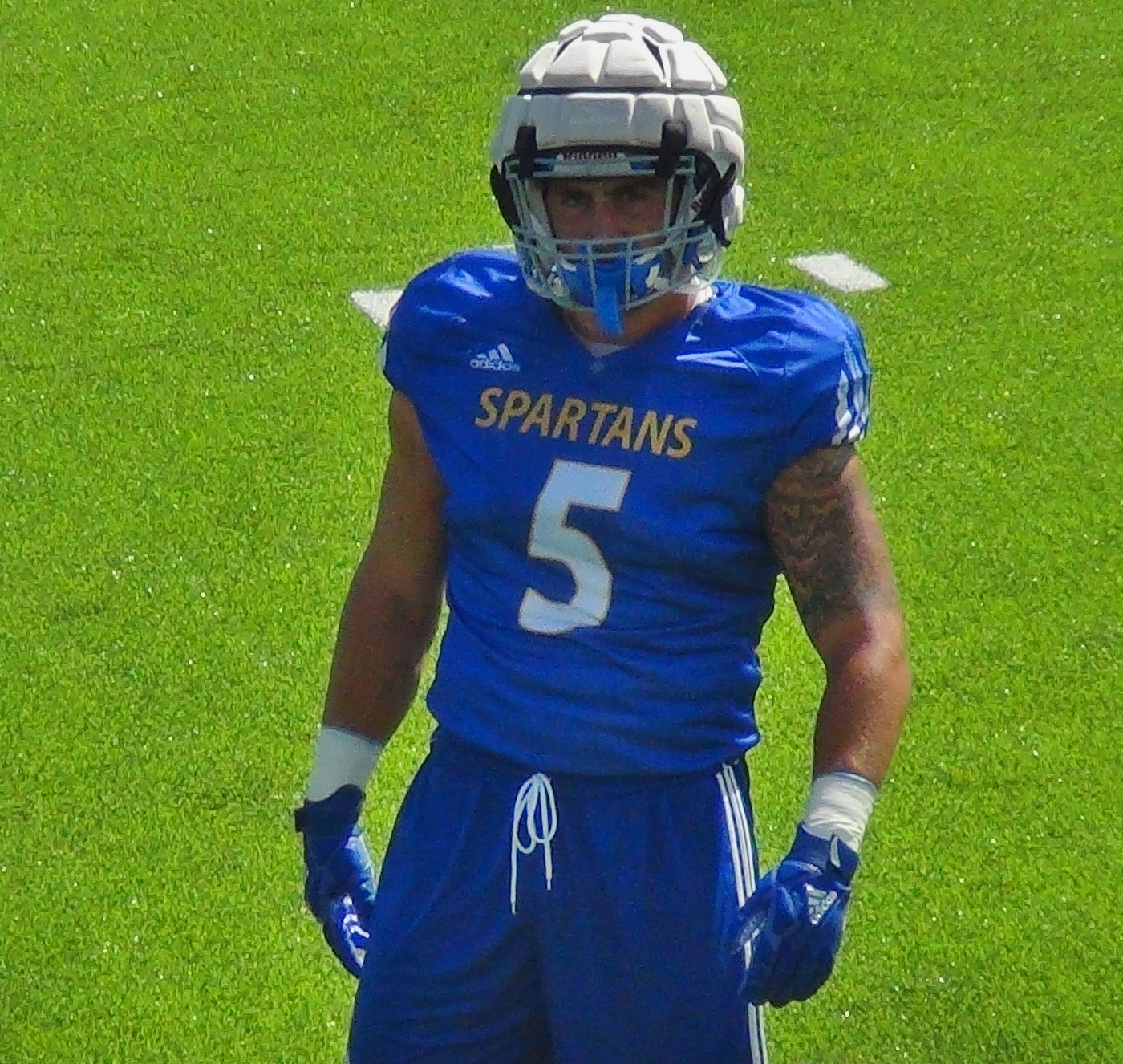
- Ginda with San Jose Spartans in 2017

Profile
- Position: Linebacker

Personal information
- Born: May 26, 1997 (age 29); San Jose, California, U.S.
- Listed height: 6 ft 1 in (1.85 m)
- Listed weight: 228 lb (103 kg)

Career information
- High school: Pacheco (Los Banos, California)
- College: San Jose State
- NFL draft: 2018: undrafted

Career history
- Arizona Cardinals (2018)*; Miami Dolphins (2018)*; San Diego Fleet (2019); New Orleans Saints (2019)*; New York Guardians (2020); Michigan Panthers (2022–2023); Atlanta Falcons (2023)*; Michigan Panthers (2024); Los Angeles Chargers (2024)*; Michigan Panthers (2025)
- * Offseason or practice squad member only

Awards and highlights
- USFL Defensive Player of the Year (2023); All-USFL Team (2023); USFL combined tackles leader (2023); NCAA leading tackler (2017); First-team All-Mountain West (2017)

Frank Ginda (born May 26, 1997) is an American professional football linebacker. He played college football at San Jose State.

== Early life ==
Ginda attended Pacheco High School in Los Banos, California. Along with football, he also participated in basketball and track and field. Ginda committed to play football at San Jose State University on October 14, 2014.

== College career ==
As a true freshman in 2015, Ginda played in 13 games, making 12 starts, tallying 80 tackles, 4.5 tackles for loss, and one sack. Ginda was named true freshman of the year after having a stellar year.

In 2016, as a sophomore, Ginda played in 12 games, making 99 tackles and 11.5 tackles for loss, including five games with ten or more tackles. In addition, he had 6.5 sacks, two forced fumbles, two fumble recoveries, and one interception.

As a junior in 2017, Ginda was the NCAA leading tackler with 173 total tackles, with 94 being solo. His 173 total tackles is most in Mountain West Conference history. He was named to All-Mountain West first-team. After the season, he declared for the 2018 NFL draft, foregoing his senior season.

== Professional career ==
=== Arizona Cardinals ===
Ginda signed with the Arizona Cardinals as an undrafted free agent on April 30, 2018. He was waived on June 15, 2018, after coaching changes played a huge factor in his release.

=== Miami Dolphins ===
On July 24, 2018, Ginda signed with the Miami Dolphins. During the preseason, Ginda saw action on defense and special teams where he totaled 22 tackles, four tackles for loss, and a forced fumble. In the final preseason game, Ginda led the team with 10 tackles, two tackles for loss, and a forced fumble in a 34–7 win over the Atlanta Falcons. Ginda was waived on the last day of roster cuts on September 1, 2018. Following final roster cuts, Ginda was signed to the practice squad.

=== San Diego Fleet ===
Ginda signed with the San Diego Fleet of the Alliance of American Football (AAF). During his time in the AAF before it folded, Ginda lead his team with 41 total tackles including four for-loss, two pass breakups, and one forced fumble that was returned for a touchdown. The league ceased operations in April 2019.

=== New Orleans Saints ===
On May 3, 2019, Ginda signed with the New Orleans Saints. He was a part of the team through the 2019 organized team activities and preseason with the team before getting waived on the last day of roster cuts on September 1.

=== New York Guardians ===
In October 2019, Ginda was selected by the New York Guardians of the XFL in the open phase of the 2020 XFL draft. Ginda was chosen as one of six captains as the youngest player on the roster. Ginda ended the season with 31 tackles, 5 for a loss, and 2 quarterback hurries. He had his contract terminated when the league suspended operations on April 10, 2020.

=== Michigan Panthers (first stint) ===
Ginda was selected by the Michigan Panthers of the United States Football League (USFL) in the 2022 USFL draft. Ginda was chosen by his teammates as one of four team captains. During the USFL inaugural season, Ginda finished with 90 tackles which was second in the league, 10 tackles for loss, four quarterback pressures, two sacks, and one forced fumble.

In Ginda's second season with the Panthers, Ginda won USFL Defensive Player of the Year and was selected as an All-USFL linebacker. He completed his season with 115 tackles, three interceptions, two sacks, two forced fumbles, six pass breakups, and six tackles for loss. Ginda was also named defensive player of the week four times during the 10-game season. Ginda was also named team captain. He was released from his contract on August 12, 2023, to sign with an NFL team.

=== Atlanta Falcons ===
On August 13, 2023, Ginda signed with the Atlanta Falcons. He played in two of the three preseason games for the Falcons. In the two games, he finished with 12 total tackles; three in which were on special teams. In the preseason finale against the Pittsburgh Steelers, Ginda led the team with 10 total tackles. He was waived on August 29, 2023. Ginda re-signed with the Falcons practice squad on November 28, 2023. He was released on December 22, 2023 and re-signed to the practice squad three days later on December 25, 2023. He did not sign a reserve/future contract after the season and thus became a free agent upon the expiration of his practice squad contract.

=== Michigan Panthers (second stint) ===
On February 14, 2024, Ginda re-signed with the Michigan Panthers. He was placed on injured reserve on May 9. His contract was terminated on August 18, to sign with an NFL team.

=== Los Angeles Chargers ===
On August 19, 2024, Ginda signed with the Los Angeles Chargers. He was waived on August 27.

=== Michigan Panthers (third stint) ===
On January 24, 2024, Ginda re-signed with the Michigan Panthers. He was placed on injured reserve on May 12, 2025.

== See also ==
- List of NCAA major college football yearly tackles leaders
