= John Atkins (American football) =

American football player (born 1992)

Profile
- Position: Nose tackle

Personal information
- Born: December 21, 1992 (age 33); Thomson, Georgia, U.S.
- Listed height: 6 ft 3 in (1.91 m)
- Listed weight: 320 lb (145 kg)

Career information
- High school: Thomson
- College: Georgia
- NFL draft: 2018: undrafted

Career history
- New England Patriots (2018)*; Detroit Lions (2018–2020); Atlanta Falcons (2021)*; Tampa Bay Bandits (2022); Memphis Showboats (2023–2025)
- * Offseason or practice squad member only

Awards and highlights
- All-USFL Team (2023)

Career NFL statistics
- Total tackles: 22
- Stats at Pro Football Reference

Johnathan Bandavious Atkins (born December 21, 1992) is an American professional football nose tackle. He played college football at Georgia, and has been a member of the New England Patriots, Detroit Lions, and Atlanta Falcons.

== College career ==
Atkins spent five seasons as a member of Georgia Bulldogs, redshirting his freshman year. During his redshirt senior season, Atkins made 38 tackles, including one for a loss, as the Bulldogs' starting nose tackle. He finished his collegiate career with 81 total tackles, 3.5 for loss, five pass deflections, and a fumble recovery in 48 games played.

== Professional career ==
Pre-draft measurables
Height	Weight	Arm length	Hand span	40-yard dash	20-yard shuttle	Three-cone drill	Vertical jump	Broad jump
6 ft 2 7/8 in (1.90 m)	321 lb (146 kg)	34 in (0.86 m)	9 1/4 in (0.23 m)	5.38 s	4.75 s	7.95 s	24.0 in (0.61 m)	7 ft 5 in (2.26 m)
All values from NFL Combine

=== New England Patriots ===
Atkins signed with the New England Patriots as an undrafted free agent on April 29, 2018. Considered a long shot to make the team, Atkins was cut by the Patriots at the end of training camp on September 1, 2018.

=== Detroit Lions ===
Atkins was signed to the Detroit Lions' practice squad on September 3, 2018. Atkins was waived by the team on November 30, 2018, but subsequently re-signed to the practice squad. Aktins was promoted to the Lions' Active roster on December 18, 2018, after defensive tackle Da'Shawn Hand was placed on injured reserve. Atkins made his NFL debut on December 23, 2018, in a 27–9 loss to the Minnesota Vikings, making two tackles (one for loss).

On August 31, 2019, Atkins was waived by the Lions as part of final roster cuts, but was signed to the team's practice squad the next day. He was promoted to the active roster on October 14. Atkins played in 12 games during the 2019 season, including six starts, and made 20 tackles.

On July 29, 2020, Atkins announced he was opting out of the 2020 season due to the COVID-19 pandemic. He was waived after the season on June 2, 2021.

=== Atlanta Falcons ===
On June 17, 2021, Atkins signed with the Atlanta Falcons. He was waived on August 14.

=== Tampa Bay Bandits ===
On February 23, 2022, Atkins was drafted in the 2022 USFL draft by the Tampa Bay Bandits.

=== Memphis Showboats ===
Atkins and all other Tampa Bay Bandits players were all transferred to the Memphis Showboats after it was announced that the Bandits were taking a hiatus and that the Showboats were joining the league. Atkins was named to the 2023 All USFL Team. He re-signed with the Showboats on December 6, 2023, and again on August 26, 2024.

On April 11, 2025, Atkins was placed on injured reserve.
