= Isaiah Zuber =

American football player (born 1997)

Profile
- Position: Wide receiver

Personal information
- Born: April 15, 1997 (age 29); Stone Mountain, Georgia, U.S.
- Listed height: 6 ft 0 in (1.83 m)
- Listed weight: 190 lb (86 kg)

Career information
- High school: Stephenson (Stone Mountain, Georgia)
- College: Kansas State (2015–2018); Mississippi State (2019)
- NFL draft: 2020: undrafted

Career history
- New England Patriots (2020); San Francisco 49ers (2021)*; Cleveland Browns (2021)*; New York Jets (2021)*; Houston Gamblers (2022); Las Vegas Raiders (2022–2023)*; Houston Gamblers (2023); Las Vegas Raiders (2023)*; Houston Roughnecks (2024)*; Birmingham Stallions (2024); Hamilton Tiger-Cats (2025)*
- * Offseason or practice squad member only

Awards and highlights
- UFL champion (2024); USFL receiving touchdowns leader (2022)

Career NFL statistics
- Receptions: 2
- Receiving yards: 29
- Rushing yards: 21
- Stats at Pro Football Reference

Isaiah Zuber (born April 15, 1997) is an American professional football wide receiver and punt returner. He was most recently a member of the Hamilton Tiger-Cats of the Canadian Football League (CFL). He played college football at Kansas State and Mississippi State.

== College career ==
Zuber began his collegiate career at Kansas State, redshirting as a freshman. He had 141 receptions, 1,532 receiving yards and 13 touchdowns over the next three seasons. After his redshirt junior year, he transferred to Mississippi State for his final season of eligibility. Zuber had 14 receptions for 211 yards and two touchdowns in his lone season at Mississippi State.

== Professional career ==
Pre-draft measurables
| Height | Weight |
|---|---|
| 5 ft 11 1/4 in (1.81 m) | 190 lb (86 kg) |
Values from Pro Day

=== New England Patriots ===
Zuber was signed by the New England Patriots as an undrafted free agent following the 2020 NFL draft on April 25, 2020. He was waived by the team on July 26, 2020. but was re-signed by the Patriots on August 5, 2020. Zuber was waived on September 5, 2020, during final roster cuts, and signed to the practice squad the next day. He was elevated to the active roster on September 26 for the team's week 3 game against the Las Vegas Raiders, and made his NFL debut in the game. He reverted to the practice squad after the game on September 28, 2020. He was elevated again on October 5, October 17, 2020, and October 31, 2020, for the weeks 4, 6, and 8 games against the Kansas City Chiefs, Denver Broncos, and Buffalo Bills, and reverted to the practice squad again following each game. He signed a reserve/future contract on January 4, 2021. Zuber's first touchdown reception came on August 29, 2021, in the preseason game against the Giants. On August 31, 2021, Zuber was waived by the Patriots.

=== San Francisco 49ers ===
On September 3, 2021, Zuber was signed to the San Francisco 49ers practice squad. He was released on September 14, 2021.

=== Cleveland Browns ===
Zuber was signed to the Cleveland Browns' practice squad on November 9, 2021. He was released on November 16, 2021.

=== New York Jets ===
On December 22, 2021, Zuber was signed to the New York Jets practice squad. He was released on December 30.

=== Houston Gamblers (first stint) ===
Zuber was selected in the 13th round of the 2022 USFL draft by the Houston Gamblers.

=== Las Vegas Raiders (first stint) ===
On July 19, 2022, Zuber was signed by the Las Vegas Raiders. He was waived on August 30, 2022, and signed to the practice squad the next day. He signed a reserve/future contract on January 9, 2023, and was released on April 13.

=== Houston Gamblers (second stint) ===
Zuber re-signed with the Houston Gamblers on April 19, 2023. He was released from his contract on August 14, 2023, to sign with an NFL team.

=== Las Vegas Raiders (second stint) ===
On August 15, 2023, Zuber signed with the Las Vegas Raiders. He was placed on injured reserve on August 27. He was released on September 5.

=== Houston Roughnecks (third stint) ===
Zuber re-signed with the Houston Gamblers on December 16, 2023. Zuber and all other Houston Gamblers players and coaches were all transferred to the Houston Roughnecks after it was announced that the Gamblers took on the identity of their XFL counterpart, the Roughnecks. He was waived in March 2024.

=== Birmingham Stallions ===
On March 13, 2024, Zuber was claimed off waivers by the Birmingham Stallions.

=== Hamilton Tiger-Cats ===
Zuber signed with the Hamilton Tiger-Cats on January 23, 2025. However, he was part of the final cuts on June 1, 2025.
