= 2024 UFL season =

Inaugural season of the UFL

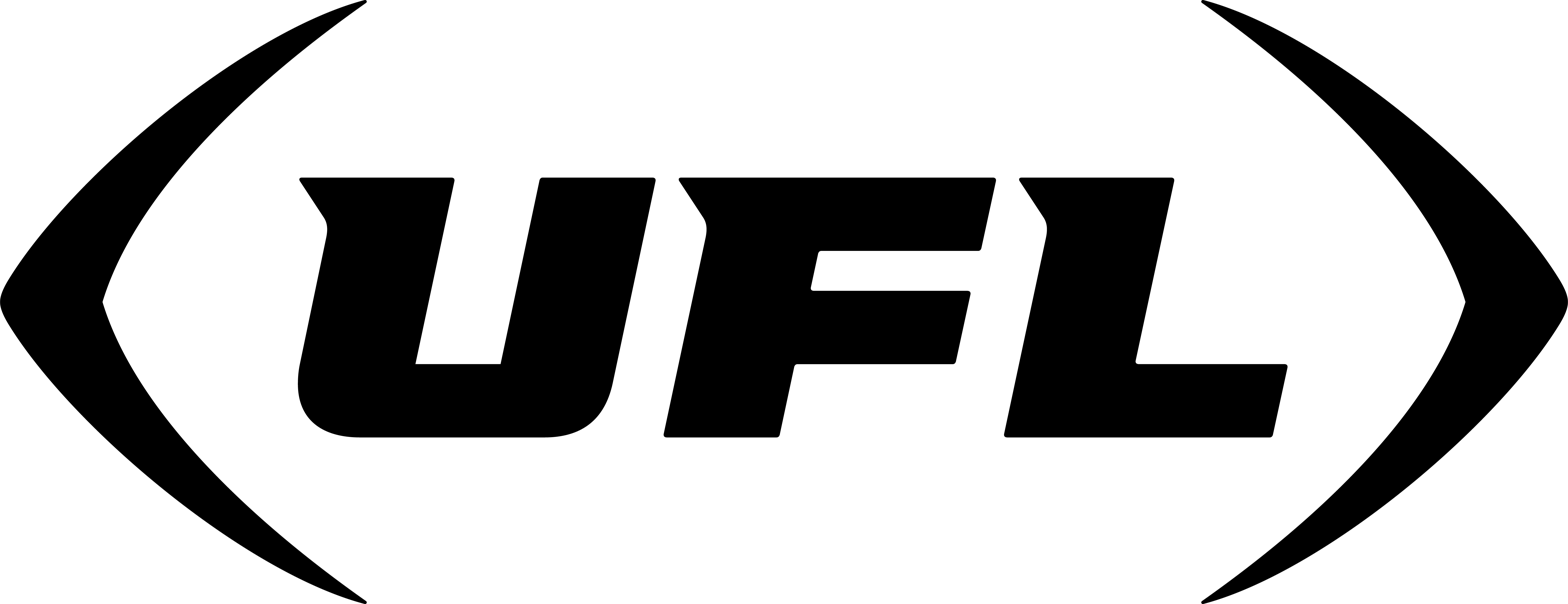
- League: United Football League
- Sport: American football
- Duration: Regular season: March 30 – June 2 Playoffs: June 8–16
- Games: 43 (40 regular-season games, 3 postseason games)
- Teams: 8
- TV partner(s): ABC, ESPN, ESPN2, Fox, FS1
- Streaming partner(s): ESPN+, Fox Sports app
- Season MVP: Adrian Martinez
- USFL champions: Birmingham Stallions
- USFL runners-up: Michigan Panthers
- XFL champions: San Antonio Brahmas
- XFL runners-up: St. Louis Battlehawks

2024 UFL Championship
- Venue: The Dome at America's Center, St. Louis, Missouri
- Champions: Birmingham Stallions
- Runners-up: San Antonio Brahmas
- Finals MVP: Adrian Martinez

Seasons
- 2023 (USFL) ← 2023 (XFL) 2025 →

The 2024 UFL season was the first season of the United Football League, which was created following the merger of the XFL and USFL, and the fifth season in the combined history of the two leagues, following the 2020 XFL season, 2022 USFL season, and separate 2023 seasons for both the USFL and XFL.

The regular season began on March 30, 2024, and ended on June 2, 2024. The season kicked off with a matchup between the 2023 XFL champion Arlington Renegades and the 2023 USFL champion Birmingham Stallions. The postseason started on June 8, 2024 and concluded on June 16, 2024 with the 2024 UFL Championship.

The Birmingham Stallions defeated the San Antonio Brahmas 25–0 in the 2024 UFL Championship Game, the only shutout of the entire season, to win their third consecutive spring football championship, adding to their back-to-back championships in the rebooted USFL.

== Offseason ==
=== Pre-merger ===
==== USFL ====
On June 27, 2023, USFL President of Football Operations Daryl Johnston initially confirmed in an interview that the league would return for the 2024 season.

USFL average viewership in 2023 was down 16% from its debut season to 601,000 and 3% lower than the 2023 XFL season, despite having 28 over-the-air network games compared to eight for the XFL. The championship game also saw a significant decline in viewership from 2022 as the game averaged 1.2 million viewers across NBC, Peacock, and NBC Sports digital platforms. Johnston expressed disappointment and anger that the USFL was comparable to the XFL in ratings for the 2023 season, dismissing the XFL as "no competition" to the "far superior" USFL and questioning how "to be on par with our competition from a ratings standpoint in Year 2, I'm still trying to figure out: How did that happen? (...) they're not even close."

40 players who played in the 2023 USFL season signed contracts with NFL teams. Two players (LaBryan Ray and Brandon Aubrey) started the 2023 NFL season on active 53-man NFL rosters, 11 other players started the season on practice squads, and Isaiah Zuber was placed on injured reserve. 16 players finished the season on NFL rosters, with Aubrey selected to the Pro Bowl.

==== XFL ====
The XFL lost nearly $60 million during the season after spending approximately $140 million in expenses over the course of the 2023 season and earned $80 million in gross revenue, including roughly $20 million that came from its broadcast contract with ESPN. Executives with the league and ESPN indicated that they considered the season a success. After the season ended, the XFL made league wide cuts affecting up to 30 people, including two marketing executives, and shifted other employees to seasonal work. According to several reports, the XFL marketing budget was only $120,000 for the 2023 season.

More than 200 players who played in the 2023 XFL season earned invitations to workout for NFL teams, while 63 of them signed contracts. One player (Daniel Whelan) started the 2023 NFL season on an active 53-man NFL roster, while 17 other players started the season on practice squads. 23 players finished the season on NFL rosters.

During the 2023 season, XFL players filed a petition (through the United Steelworkers) for a representation election with Region 16 of the National Labor Relations Board, but decided against joining the union by vote of 124 to 73.

=== Merger ===
On September 19, 2023, Axios reported that USFL owner Fox Corporation and the Garcia/Johnson/RedBird Capital Partners consortium that owned the XFL were in advanced talks to create a "merger of equals" between the two leagues before the start of the 2024 season, with an agreement potentially announced by the end of the month. The USFL registered a trademark for "National Spring Football League," the name of the USFL's parent company but speculated to also be a name for the potential merged league, that was made public September 27. On September 28, 2023, the USFL and XFL announced their intent to merge with the specific details of the merger to be announced at a later date. The merger would also require regulatory approval. In October 2023 the XFL filed a trademark application for the name "United Football League". On November 30, 2023, XFL chairwoman Dany Garcia announced via her Instagram page that the leagues had completed the antitrust review process to approve their merger, and the leagues will "play a combined season" kicking off on March 30, 2024. XFL President Russ Brandon will serve in the same capacity for the combined league, with Johnston being assigned to director of football operations. The USFL informed its players association of the four teams in its league to survive the merger on December 19, with the other four teams to be disbanded.

On December 27, 2023, during the broadcast of the 2023 Holiday Bowl, Fox aired a clip of Jeff Brohm's "let's play football" speech from the original incarnation of the XFL and announced that details on its involvement in the new merged league would follow "very soon." Three days later, the merger was formally announced on Fox NFL Sunday. The eight teams and head coaches were announced by Dwayne Johnson in a guest appearance on ESPN's College GameDay on January 1, 2024.

Overall, 120 players from both the USFL and XFL signed some form of contract with the NFL for the 2023 season and nine players were signed during the NFL 2024 free agency period; in turn, 12 practice squad players from the 2023 NFL season signed with the UFL for 2024, with the league actively recruiting others prior to the season.

== Teams ==
The merged league retained the XFL and USFL brands as individual conferences. Four teams came from the XFL, while three came from the USFL. The two leagues' Houston-based teams merged under the name and branding of the XFL's Roughnecks, but the merged team took the Gamblers' place in the USFL Conference and retained the Gamblers' player rights and coaching staff.

Teams in the 2024 UFL season
Conference	Team	Location	Stadium	Capacity	First season	Head coach
USFL Conference	Birmingham Stallions	Birmingham, Alabama	Protective Stadium	47,100	2022	Skip Holtz
USFL Conference	Houston Roughnecks	Houston, Texas	Rice Stadium	47,000	2022	Curtis Johnson
USFL Conference	Memphis Showboats	Memphis, Tennessee	Simmons Bank Liberty Stadium	58,325	2023	John DeFilippo
USFL Conference	Michigan Panthers	Detroit, Michigan	Ford Field	65,000	2022	Mike Nolan
XFL Conference	Arlington Renegades	Arlington, Texas	Choctaw Stadium	25,000	2020	Bob Stoops
XFL Conference	DC Defenders	Washington, D.C.	Audi Field	20,000	2020	Reggie Barlow
XFL Conference	San Antonio Brahmas	San Antonio, Texas	Alamodome	64,000	2023	Wade Phillips
XFL Conference	St. Louis Battlehawks	St. Louis, Missouri	The Dome at America's Center	67,277	2020	Anthony Becht

Locations of current teams for the 2024 UFL season, (USFL Conference – red; XFL Conference – blue)

== Coaches ==
Eight of the 16 head coaches from both leagues' 2023 season returned, some with different teams, with all coaches being announced on January 1, 2024. All eight coaches led a team in one of the two leagues during the 2023 season and five were returning to the same squads as 2023. Former XFL coaches Reggie Barlow, Anthony Becht, and Bob Stoops agreed to a future pay cut to remain in the new league, while Hines Ward refused.

Rod Woodson had resigned his position with the Vegas Vipers before the team was contracted. The remaining five coaches—the Generals' Mike Riley, the Stars' Bart Andrus, the Maulers' Ray Horton, the Guardians' Terrell Buckley, and the Sea Dragons' Jim Haslett—saw their positions eliminated with the merger. Anthony Blevins, who had been named Woodson's successor. would join the Stallions staff as an assistant near the end of the 2024 season.

Coaches in the 2024 UFL season
Team	2023 coach	2024 coach	Notes
Arlington Renegades	Bob Stoops		Stoops returns for his third season with Arlington after compiling a 6–9 (.400) mark over the 2020 and 2023 seasons and winning the 2023 XFL Championship.
Birmingham Stallions	Skip Holtz		Holtz returns for his third season with the Stallions after compiling a 17–3 (.850) record in 2022–23, winning the USFL Championship Game in both seasons.
DC Defenders	Reggie Barlow		Barlow returns for his second season with DC after compiling a 9–1 (.900) record in 2023 and reaching the XFL Championship.
Houston Roughnecks	Curtis Johnson		Johnson coached the 2023 Houston Gamblers, compiling a 5–5 (.500) mark. After taking on the identity of the XFL Roughnecks, Johnson and his staff was kept on to lead the team, which is technically a continuation of the Gamblers.
Memphis Showboats	Todd Haley	John DeFilippo	The USFL fired head Memphis Showboats coach Todd Haley on October 23 and reassigned former New Orleans Breakers coach John DeFilippo to the Showboats. DeFilippo led the Breakers to a 7–3 (.700) record in 2023, losing in the USFL South Division championship.
Michigan Panthers	Mike Nolan		Nolan returns for his second season with Michigan after going 4–6 (.400) in 2023 and falling in the North Division championship.
San Antonio Brahmas	Hines Ward	Wade Phillips	Hines Ward resigned on December 28, 2023, and Roughnecks coach Wade Phillips was reassigned to the Brahmas after being displaced by Curtis Johnson, who assumed control of the newly-merged Roughnecks. Phillips led the 2023 Roughnecks to a 7–3 (.700) record before losing the XFL South Division championship.
St. Louis Battlehawks	Anthony Becht		Becht returns for his second season in St. Louis after compiling a 7–3 (.700) record in 2023.

On February 21, 2024, the league announced the teams' full coaching staffs. In March the UFL announced an expanded partnership (in collaboration with Under Armour) with the National Coalition of Minority Football Coaches (NCMFC) for creating opportunities for minority football coaches. Starting March 7, the eight selected high school coaches will attend the UFL's training camp in Arlington, assisting with team meetings, practices and address team needs, they will also join their team for five home games in their respective markets, assisting on the sidelines and working with staff on key projects. NCMFC coaches for the 2024 season will be: Nkere Reed (Renegades), Jason Winchell (Stallions), Eric Allie (Defenders), Yusef Johnson (Roughnecks), Rodney Saulsberry Sr. (Showboats), Marcus Green (Panthers), Matthew Bullock (Brahmas) and Kenneth Boyer (Battlehawks).

== Players ==
Players reported to training camp February 23, 2024. Each team carried 75-men rosters to training camp and trimmed them down to 58 by March 10, 2024. Final roster cuts took place on March 23, 2024, with regular-season rosters set at 50 (45 active on game day). The minimum stay on injured reserve will be for five games, while a season-ending injured reserve designation guarantees player a camp invitation the following season.

While the UFL embraced more of a "developmental league" mentality, they're also targeting veteran backup-type players, with Johnston saying: "there are a lot of guys who are at peace that their NFL window has closed, but they love the camaraderie of the locker room. They love the day-to-day grind... That's been the really inspiring thing to me, is there is a number of guys in our league who just love the game and want to keep playing it as long as they can. Players that have three or four years in the NFL and want to kind of rewrite that narrative, the way that they're being viewed by front office's in the NFL, they want an opportunity to come into the UFL and change that narrative".

Before week three, after several NFL teams approached Panthers K Jake Bates, it was revealed that according to the leagues agreement NFL teams are allowed to contact UFL teams about their players, but cannot directly contact or sign players under contract with the UFL until after the UFL season ended.

=== Unionization and compensation ===
Local 9004 of the United Steelworkers, which had served as the labor union for the USFL in 2023, continued in that capacity for the 2024 season of the tr UFL, operating as the United Football League Players Association. (This is not to be confused with the United Football Players Association, which Local 9004 disowned during the 2023–24 offseason, but now represents the UFL players.) The league will continue operating under the USFL's collective bargaining agreement.

Initial reports suggested that, contrary to the 2023 XFL season, quarterbacks would not be allowed to sign for salaries higher than the other positional players. However, the UFLPA later clarified that the agreement with the league is for minimum salary only, and any player could sign a personal contract above the minimum. As late as January 2024, the league had resisted "pushback" from some of the higher-paid XFL quarterbacks to increase quarterbacks' salary, with Johnston at the time refusing to deviate from the plan to pay all players equally while acknowledging "there's a good argument for both sides. How do we manage this situation(...)? It's hard to thread that needle."

Select XFL players, who had voted against joining the USW in 2023, expressed concern about the lack of winning bonuses (a key feature of the XFL's pay structure) and a requirement to pay union dues, while some players decided not to return to the league, citing the pay cut as a contributing factor. On an interview after the merger, former Battlehawks QB AJ McCarron revealed that XFL players were in advanced talks with the National Football League Players Association (NFLPA) for exclusive representation.

==== Salary ====
UFL players' minimum salaries will be $5,500 per week ($2,500 for inactive players) and $150 a week toward 401K contributions, with $400-a-week house stipend and $55-a-day per diem stipend during travel days. All contracts will run from January 1 to August 24. During training camp, all players will receive $850 a week. Players on injured reserve will receive $2,500 a week (plus house stipend). UFL players will also be entitled for "players accolade bonuses" for Player of the week ($1,000), All UFL ($2,500), Player of the year ($5,000), and MVP ($7,500). The overall league player budget is $24 million.

=== Drafts ===
==== 2023 USFL draft ====
On February 21, 2023, the USFL held a draft where 2023 draft-eligible players could be selected by USFL teams. In the announcement, USFL Executive Vice President of Football Operations Daryl Johnston stated, "We are building the USFL for long-term success and our first-ever College Draft demonstrates our clear focus on building winning teams for Season Two, Season Three and beyond." Eighty players were selected across 10 rounds. Due to this draft occurring two months prior to the 2023 NFL draft, many of the players selected would go on to be drafted by or sign as an undrafted free agent with an NFL team.

==== 2023 XFL rookie draft ====
In an interview after the 2023 XFL season, the league's Senior Vice President of Player Personnel Doug Whaley disclosed that the league plans a "rookie" draft and intended to conduct "multiple drafts" in the fall of 2023. The XFL Rookie Draft took place on June 16, 2023, with 80 players being selected.

On July 28, the XFL held a "rights claim" draft, which had not been announced to the public, and the picks were later released through the official XFL transaction page. The players' rights were assigned to the selected teams, but they were not under contract with the teams (similar to the "negotiation lists" in the CFL). The players selected included: Tavon Austin, Darrynton Evans, Chris Odom, Dru Samia, Josh Jackson, Darrell Henderson, Harrison Hand, Quinton Bell, and Anthony Gordon.

==== UFL dispersal draft ====
On December 19, 2023, the USFL initially informed the USFL Players Association that four teams would be contracted as part of the USFL–XFL merger. The transition involved a three-phase player allocation process, with a similar system to be used for XFL players. Phase 1 and 2 was held January 5, and an open dispersal draft for remaining USFL/XFL players (phase 3) took place January 15, 2024:

- Phase 1: Each remaining USFL/XFL team identified up to 42 "protected" Contract Players from its roster (or in the XFL's case, had signed a letter of intent with that team).
- Phase 2: Teams then claimed up to 20 additional "protected" players from the four teams in their respective league that were contracted.
- Phase 3: A dispersal draft, billed as the UFL Super Draft, included all USFL/XFL players not "protected" in the earlier phases. Non-contracted players who have previously participated in the USFL or XFL must sign with the respective league before the draft.

=== Player movement ===
==== Free agency ====
Free agency started on January 16, 2024, for players who were not selected in the Dispersal draft or did not play in the USFL or XFL in 2023.

- Amid the XFL–USFL merger, several players decided to withdraw their name from the dispersal draft pool and sign with CFL teams.
- On January 16, 2024, the St. Louis Battlehawks re-signed 2023 XFL Special Teams Player of the Year Darrius Shepherd.
- On January 17, 2024, the DC Defenders signed former NFL first-round pick DT Robert Nkemdiche.
- On January 18, 2024, the Birmingham Stallions signed former Alabama WR Slade Bolden.
- On January 19, 2024, the Birmingham Stallions signed 2023 All-USFL CB Mark Gilbert, while the San Antonio Brahmas signed S Vernon Scott and 2023 All-XFL DT Caeveon Patton.
- On January 20, 2024, the league announced that UFL teams signed a total of 42 players in the first week of free agency, including former NFL players RB Ryan Nall (Houston Roughnecks), WR Marcell Ateman (St. Louis Battlehawks), WR Trey Quinn (Michigan Panthers), LB Joel Iyiegbuniwe, CB Darius Phillips and K Matt Ammendola (San Antonio Brahmas).
- On January 22, 2024, the league announced that UFL teams signed 19 additional players, including: QB's E. J. Perry (Michigan Panthers) and Nolan Henderson (Houston Roughnecks) and MLB Marquel Lee (Arlington Renegades).
- On January 22, 2024, the league released a list of additional 20 players who signed as free agents with UFL teams, including: G Abdul Beecham (St. Louis Battlehawks) WR Matt Landers and DE Trevon Coley (Arlington Renegades).
- On January 24, 2024, the Defenders, Renegades, Brahmas and Showboats signed a total of eight players.
- On January 24, 2024, the Roughnecks signed QB Reid Sinnett and released 2023 starting QB Kenji Bahar in a corresponding move.
- On January 25, 2024, five players signed agreements with the UFL teams, including former NFL first round pick CB Deandre Baker (DC Defenders).
- On January 26, 2024, the league released a list of 10 additional transactions, including the signing of QB Deondre Francois (DC Defenders) and K Taylor Russolino (Arlington Renegades) and the release of QB Ryan Willis (Memphis Showboats).
- On January 29, 2024, the league released a list of additional 17 players who signed as free agents with UFL teams, including: DE De'Veon Smith and P Marquette King (Arlington Renegades) and QB Troy Williams (Memphis Showboats), while three players were waived, including QB Carson Strong.
- On January 30, 2024, the league released a list of additional seven players who signed as free agents with UFL teams, including: former NFL RB Wayne Gallman (St. Louis Battlehawks) and YouTube star K Donald De La Haye (San Antonio Brahmas), while four players were waived, including former NFL first round pick WR Corey Coleman (Michigan Panthers).
- On January 31, 2024, the league released a list of additional 15 players who signed as free agents with UFL teams, including: former NFL LB Vic Beasley (Arlington Renegades) and QB Tom Flacco (San Antonio Brahmas), while CB Alijah Holder was waived.
- On February 16, 2024, the St. Louis Battlehawks resigned 2023 XFL MVP, QB A. J. McCarron, after he asked the NFL's Cincinnati Bengals to cut him so he'll be able to join the UFL.
- After not being selected in the 2024 NFL draft and after he withdrew his transfer to Texas State days after settling his civil sexual assault case, Jayden de Laura signed with the San Antonio Brahmas of the United Football League (UFL) in May 2024.

==== In-season player movement ====
Transactions

- On February 23, 2024, all teams started training camp with 75-man roster.
- On March 9, 2024, two-time USFL champion Stallions RB Bo Scarbrough announced his retirement.
- On March 10, 2024, UFL teams trimmed down their roster to 58, which include six All-USFL players being cut (Reggie Howard, Luis Aguilar, Shalom Luani, Will Likely, Channing Stribling, and Calvin Ashley).
- On March 18, 2024, Michigan Panthers announced that quarterback Davis Cheek was placed on the retired list.
- On March 23, 2024, UFL teams made their final roster cuts and trimmed down their roster to 50.
- On April 9, 2024, the Brahmas placed Donald De La Haye on injured reserve after suffering a fractured neck.

==== Trades ====
- On January 22, 2024, the league announced the first UFL trade between the Birmingham Stallions, who sent DB Alijah Holder to the San Antonio Brahmas in exchange for DB Bubba Bolden.
- On March 8, 2024, The DC Defenders sent LB Chauncey Rivers to the Birmingham Stallions for OT Jahmir Johnson.

== Rules ==
Mike Pereira and Dean Blandino will be in charge of the UFL's officiating and rules.

The league rulebook was released February 13, 2024. Though most of the UFL's unique rules were common to both the USFL and XFL (such as allowing a second forward pass if the first does not cross the line of scrimmage, and the treatment of a fumble through the end zone the same as other forward fumbles in that it is brought back to the spot of the fumble), a limited number required compromise or were changed entirely from both leagues' rules:

- The league will use the USFL's kickoff rule, which resembles that used at most levels of the game but kicks off from the kicking team's 20-yard line instead of the 35-yard line used at the college and NFL levels (as opposed to the XFL rule which kicked off from the 30-yard line but had the opposing teams line up 35 and 40 yards downfield from the kick, respectively, and required the kicker to land the kick within 20 yards of the end zone without going in). A rule proposal would replace the kickoff with a punt, thereby resembling the safety kick at other levels of the game, but this rule did not make it into the rule book.
- The onside conversion option will remain available, with a team trailing in the fourth quarter allowed to attempt a single scrimmage play to gain 12 yards from its own 28-yard line. (The XFL used 15 yards from its own 25-yard line; the USFL used 12 yards from its own 33-yard line.)
- Pass interference penalties will be classified as two types of penalties.
  - Regular defensive pass interference penalties will be limited to 15 yards from the previous line of scrimmage or the spot of the foul, whichever is less.
  - Intentional defensive pass interference is a spot foul, regardless of it being more than 15 yards from the previous line of scrimmage. Similar to a flagrant foul 1 in basketball, where it is called for a foul to stop a breakaway that would lead to a score, intentional pass interference is called when a defensive player commits pass interference against an intended receiver who would make a gain of over 15 yards or score a touchdown were he to catch the ball. This eliminates defensive players from taking advantage of the 15 yard penalty for pass interference on a play that would have gained more than 20 yards.
- The league will use the XFL's variable-distance conversion rule, offering one, two or three points depending upon how far away from the goal line the offense chooses to attempt the play, and prohibiting kicking for the extra point. (The USFL had allowed the two and three point scrimmage conversions but allowed for an extra point kick.)
- All touchbacks will come to the receiving team's 25-yard line. Any coffin corner punt that goes out of bounds beyond the 25-yard line will be treated as a touchback, a rule previously used in the XFL (though that league had used the 35-yard line for its touchbacks).
- The league will use the National Football League rule requiring a receiver to land both feet in bounds for a forward pass to be counted as complete. This was a change from both the XFL and USFL, along with most other professional leagues other than the NFL, that only required one foot in-bounds for a completed pass. This puts the league in line as a developmental league.
- The league will use remote sensing technology to determine whether the ball has advanced across the line to gain, negating the need for an official chain crew. The USFL had used similar technology, which in 2024 will be provided by BOLT6, a company that had originally signed a partnership with the XFL.
- The XFL overtime rule will be carried over, in that tie games will involve a best-of-three shootout of two-point conversion attempts from each 5-yard line. If the tie persists, multiple attempts will be played until one team scores, which wins it. One timeout can be called per attempt. The overtime has no game clock, but the play clock will still be used.
- A USFL rule regarding draft position was carried over: if the two teams with the worst regular-season record face each other in the final week of the regular season, the winner of that game will receive the first overall selection in the following year's draft. This rule was introduced in the 2022 USFL season and was invoked again in 2024, with the Houston Roughnecks and Memphis Showboats facing each other for the final game of the season.

== Season structure ==
=== Preseason ===
The UFL will continue the XFL agreement with Arlington, Texas, to serve as the league's centralized hub. The league training camps started on February 24, 2024.

For the 2024 season each team trained at a different stadium in Arlington and share it with another team throughout the season as follows:

- Choctaw Stadium – Arlington Renegades & Birmingham Stallions
- Northwest ISD High School – DC Defenders & Houston Roughnecks
- Dragon Stadium – San Antonio Brahmas & Michigan Panthers
- Vernon Newsom Stadium – St. Louis Battlehawks & Memphis Showboats

The league plan to hold an untelevised "informal scrimmages" (or "half-games") on March 9, for the league's TV partners (Battlehawks vs Stallions; Defenders vs Panthers; Brahmas vs Roughnecks and Renegades vs Showboats), in order to conduct trial runs for their broadcasts. Teams also held joint practices during the preseason.

=== Regular season ===
The league is divided into two conferences, the USFL Conference and the XFL Conference, each a continuation of its respective league. Each team will play a ten-game schedule with no bye weeks, playing two games against each conference rival (one home and one away) and one game against each team in the other conference, like the XFL, all eight teams playing in their home markets. The regular season kicked off on March 30, 2024, with a game between the USFL and XFL champions, the Birmingham Stallions and the Arlington Renegades. The league schedule was released February 5, 2024.

=== Postseason ===
The postseason will have four teams. After controversy in the 2023 XFL season in which the St. Louis Battlehawks lost out on a playoff bid on a string of tiebreakers while the Arlington Renegades, three games behind St. Louis in overall standings, advanced to the playoffs, Battlehawks head coach Anthony Becht stated in an interview that the UFL would rework the playoff system so that the winners of each conference will host the league semifinals as before, while the two remaining playoff seeds will be wild-card bids going to the best remaining overall records, regardless of conference. A statement in the schedule press release indicated otherwise, that the XFL and USFL would continue to have self-contained championship games with the first and second team in each conference facing each other. In either event, the winners of the two semifinal games will advance to the 2024 UFL Championship Game.

On March 14, 2024, the UFL announced that The Dome at America's Center, home of the Battlehawks, would host the championship, beating out an aggressive bid from Tom Benson Hall of Fame Stadium in Canton, Ohio, which had hosted both USFL championships. League executives noted that, unlike the USFL which had initially chosen Canton as a neutral site, the UFL would choose future championship sites solely from existing markets like the XFL did as a reward for strong fan support.

== Standings ==
2024 UFL standings
USFL Conference
Team	W	L	PCT	GB	TD+/-	TD+	TD-	DIV	PF	PA	DIFF	STK
(y) Birmingham Stallions	9	1	.900	–	11	31	20	6–0	265	180	85	W1
(x) Michigan Panthers	7	3	.700	2	5	27	22	4–2	228	189	39	L1
(e) Memphis Showboats	2	8	.200	7	-19	20	39	2–4	188	290	-102	W1
(e) Houston Roughnecks	1	9	.100	8	-12	17	29	0–6	158	233	-75	L6
XFL Conference
Team	W	L	PCT	GB	TD+/-	TD+	TD-	DIV	PF	PA	DIFF	STK
(y) St. Louis Battlehawks	7	3	.700	–	7	31	24	5–1	260	202	58	W1
(x) San Antonio Brahmas	7	3	.700	–	12	24	12	3–3	192	153	39	L1
(e) DC Defenders	4	6	.400	3	-2	24	26	2–4	209	251	-42	L1
(e) Arlington Renegades	3	7	.300	4	-2	26	28	2–4	247	249	-2	W2
(x)–clinched playoff berth; (y)–clinched division; (e)–eliminated from playoff contention

== Season schedule ==
All games stream on ESPN+ or Fox Sports app unless otherwise noted.

=== Regular season ===
==== Week 1 ====
Date	Time	Away team	Result		Home team	Stadium	Attendance	Broadcast	Viewership (millions)	Rating	Refs
March 30	1:00 p.m. ET	Birmingham Stallions	27	14	Arlington Renegades	Choctaw Stadium	14,153	Fox	1.18	0.7	
March 30	4:00 p.m. ET	St. Louis Battlehawks	16	18	Michigan Panthers	Ford Field	9,444	Fox	1.35	0.7	
March 31	12:00 p.m. ET	DC Defenders	12	27	San Antonio Brahmas	Alamodome	13,164	ESPN	0.96	0.5	
March 31	3:00 p.m. ET	Memphis Showboats	18	12	Houston Roughnecks	Rice Stadium	9,157	ESPN	0.70	0.4	

==== Week 2 ====
Date	Time	Away team	Result		Home team	Stadium	Attendance	Broadcast	Viewership (millions)	Rating	Refs
April 6	12:00 p.m. ET	San Antonio Brahmas	20	19	Memphis Showboats	Simmons Bank Liberty Stadium	8,791	ESPN	0.72	0.4	
April 6	8:00 p.m. ET	Arlington Renegades	24	27	St. Louis Battlehawks	The Dome at America's Center	40,317	ABC	0.91	0.5	
April 7	12:00 p.m. ET	Birmingham Stallions	20	13	Michigan Panthers	Ford Field	7,475	ESPN	0.90	0.5	
April 7	4:00 p.m. ET	Houston Roughnecks	18	23	DC Defenders	Audi Field	15,052	Fox	0.85	0.4	

==== Week 3 ====
Date	Time	Away team	Result		Home team	Stadium	Attendance	Broadcast	Viewership (millions)	Rating	Refs
April 13	1:00 p.m. ET	DC Defenders	29	28	Arlington Renegades	Choctaw Stadium	8,411	ESPN	0.53	0.3	
April 13	7:00 p.m. ET	Memphis Showboats	14	33	Birmingham Stallions	Protective Stadium	12,265	Fox	0.84	0.5	
April 14	12:00 p.m. ET	Houston Roughnecks	20	34	Michigan Panthers	Ford Field	6,952	ABC	0.97	0.6	
April 14	3:00 p.m. ET	St. Louis Battlehawks	31	24	San Antonio Brahmas	Alamodome	11,790	ABC	1.02	0.6	

==== Week 4 ====
Date	Time	Away team	Result		Home team	Stadium	Attendance	Broadcast	Viewership (millions)	Rating	Refs
April 20	12:30 p.m. ET	Memphis Showboats	17	32	St. Louis Battlehawks	The Dome at America's Center	31,757	ABC	0.95	0.6	
April 20	7:00 p.m. ET	DC Defenders	18	20	Birmingham Stallions	Protective Stadium	7,576	Fox (45%)	0.95	0.6	
April 20	7:00 p.m. ET	Michigan Panthers	9	19	San Antonio Brahmas	Alamodome	11,251	Fox (55%)	0.95	0.6	
April 21	2:00 p.m. ET	Arlington Renegades	9	17	Houston Roughnecks	Rice Stadium	7,179	FS1	0.24	0.1	

==== Week 5 ====
Date	Time	Away team	Result		Home team	Stadium	Attendance	Broadcast	Viewership (millions)	Rating	Refs
April 27	7:00 p.m. ET	Birmingham Stallions	32	9	Houston Roughnecks	Rice Stadium	6,285	Fox (89%)	0.78	0.5	
April 27	7:00 p.m. ET	San Antonio Brahmas	25	15	Arlington Renegades	Choctaw Stadium	10,283	Fox (11%)	0.78	0.5	
April 28	12:00 p.m. ET	St. Louis Battlehawks	45	12	DC Defenders	Audi Field	16,058	ESPN	0.69	0.4	
April 28	3:00 p.m. ET	Michigan Panthers	35	18	Memphis Showboats	Simmons Bank Liberty Stadium	7,640	Fox	0.73	0.4	

==== Week 6 ====
Date	Time	Away team	Result		Home team	Stadium	Attendance	Broadcast	Viewership (millions)	Rating	Refs
May 4	12:00 p.m. ET	Birmingham Stallions	39	21	Memphis Showboats	Simmons Bank Liberty Stadium	5,609	ABC	0.96	0.6	
May 4	3:00 p.m. ET	Houston Roughnecks	8	22	St. Louis Battlehawks	The Dome at America's Center	32,969	Fox	0.83	0.5	
May 5	1:00 p.m. ET	Arlington Renegades	27	28	Michigan Panthers	Ford Field	7,428	Fox	0.93	0.5	
May 5	4:00 p.m. ET	San Antonio Brahmas	12	18	DC Defenders	Audi Field	14,303	Fox	1.22	0.7	

==== Week 7 ====
Date	Time	Away team	Result		Home team	Stadium	Attendance	Broadcast	Viewership (millions)	Rating	Refs
May 11	1:00 p.m. ET	Memphis Showboats	23	47	Arlington Renegades	Choctaw Stadium	8,042	ESPN	0.59	0.3	
May 11	4:00 p.m. ET	St. Louis Battlehawks	26	30	Birmingham Stallions	Protective Stadium	14,056	Fox	0.76	0.5	
May 12	12:00 p.m. ET	Michigan Panthers	22	9	DC Defenders	Audi Field	12,222	ESPN	0.67	0.4	
May 12	3:00 p.m. ET	San Antonio Brahmas	15	12	Houston Roughnecks	Rice Stadium	6,134	ESPN	0.57	0.3	

==== Week 8 ====
Date	Time	Away team	Result		Home team	Stadium	Attendance	Broadcast	Viewership (millions)	Rating	Refs
May 18	4:00 p.m. ET	Memphis Showboats	18	24	Michigan Panthers	Ford Field	9,370	Fox	0.67	0.4	
May 18	8:00 p.m. ET	Houston Roughnecks	28	35	Birmingham Stallions	Protective Stadium	10,245	ESPN2	0.25	0.2	
May 19	12:00 p.m. ET	DC Defenders	21	26	St. Louis Battlehawks	The Dome at America's Center	32,403	ABC	1.10	0.6	
May 19	4:00 p.m. ET	Arlington Renegades	15	20	San Antonio Brahmas	Alamodome	11,395	Fox	0.55	0.3	

==== Week 9 ====
Date	Time	Away team	Result		Home team	Stadium	Attendance	Broadcast	Viewership (millions)	Rating	Refs
May 25	12:00 p.m. ET	St. Louis Battlehawks	22	36	Arlington Renegades	Choctaw Stadium	8,545	ABC	0.89	0.5	
May 25	3:00 p.m. ET	Birmingham Stallions	9	18	San Antonio Brahmas	Alamodome	11,839	ABC	1.07	0.6	
May 26	2:30 p.m. ET	DC Defenders	36	21	Memphis Showboats	Simmons Bank Liberty Stadium	6,387	Fox (24%)	0.80	0.5	
May 26	2:30 p.m. ET	Michigan Panthers	26	22	Houston Roughnecks	Rice Stadium	6,527	Fox (76%)	0.80	0.5	

==== Week 10 ====
Date	Time	Away team	Result		Home team	Stadium	Attendance	Broadcast	Viewership (millions)	Rating	Refs
June 1	2:00 p.m. ET	Michigan Panthers	19	20	Birmingham Stallions	Protective Stadium	7,133	ESPN	0.75	0.4	
June 1	4:00 p.m. ET	San Antonio Brahmas	12	13	St. Louis Battlehawks	The Dome at America's Center	34,379	Fox	0.84	0.5	
June 2	12:00 p.m. ET	Arlington Renegades	32	31	DC Defenders	Audi Field	13,080	ABC	0.89	0.6	
June 2	7:00 p.m. ET	Houston Roughnecks	12	19	Memphis Showboats	Simmons Bank Liberty Stadium	6,039	Fox	0.65	0.4	

=== Postseason ===
The playoffs commenced on June 8 and 9 and ended with the championship game on June 16.

Conference finals June 8–9, 2024
USFL1	Birmingham Stallions	31
USFL2	Michigan Panthers	18
XFL1	St. Louis Battlehawks	15
XFL2	San Antonio Brahmas	25

UFL championship June 16, 2024
USFL1	Birmingham Stallions	25
XFL2	San Antonio Brahmas	0

==== Conference finals ====
Date	Time	Away team	Result		Home team	Stadium	Attendance	Broadcast	Viewership (millions)	Rating	Refs
June 8	3:00 p.m. ET	Michigan Panthers	18	31	Birmingham Stallions	Protective Stadium	10,287	ABC	1.10	0.7	
June 9	7:00 p.m. ET	San Antonio Brahmas	25	15	St. Louis Battlehawks	The Dome at America's Center	30,237	Fox	1.27	0.7	

==== UFL championship ====
Date	Time	Away team	Result		Home team	Stadium	Attendance	Broadcast	Viewership (millions)	Rating	Refs
June 16	5:00 p.m. ET	Birmingham Stallions	25	0	San Antonio Brahmas	The Dome at America's Center	27,396	Fox	1.60	0.8	

== Attendance ==
Announced attendance figures for each home game. In the weekly columns, dashes (—) indicate away games, while bold font indicates the highest attendance of the week.

Team / Week	1	2	3	4	5	6	7	8	9	10	Conference finals	Championship	Total	Average
**Arlington Renegades**	**14,153**	—	8,411	—	10,283	—	8,042	—	8,545	—	—N/a	—N/a	49,434	9,887
**Birmingham Stallions**	—	—	**12,265**	7,576	—	—	**14,056**	10,245	—	7,133	10,287	—	61,562	10,260
**DC Defenders**	—	15,052	—	—	**16,058**	14,303	12,222	—	—	13,080	—N/a	—N/a	70,715	14,143
**Houston Roughnecks**	9,157	—	—	7,179	6,285	—	6,134	—	6,527	—	—N/a	—N/a	35,282	7,056
**Memphis Showboats**	—	8,791	—	—	7,640	5,609	—	—	6,387	6,039	—N/a	—N/a	34,466	6,893
**Michigan Panthers**	9,444	7,475	6,952	—	—	7,428	—	9,370	—	—	—	—N/a	40,669	8,134
**San Antonio Brahmas**	13,164	—	11,790	11,251	—	—	—	11,395	**11,839**	—	—	**27,396** (St. Louis)	86,835	14,473
**St. Louis Battlehawks**	—	**40,317**	—	**31,757**	—	**32,969**	—	**32,403**	—	**34,379**	**30,237**	—N/a	202,062	33,677
Total	45,918	71,635	39,418	57,449	40,266	60,309	40,454	63,413	33,298	60,631	40,524	27,396	580,711	
Average	11,480	17,909	9,855	14,362	10,067	15,077	10,114	15,853	8,325	15,158	20,262	27,396		13,505

The home openers for Arlington and Michigan were both up compared to their counterparts in 2023 (12,047 for Arlington, an estimated 7,500 for Michigan), while San Antonio's was down from its opener (but still in line with other home games in 2023), in part due to church service attendance Easter Sunday morning. Houston and Memphis also saw substantial declines compared to 2023, with Johnston admitting concern about the Showboats' crowd turnout and noting that it was part of a downward trend for the team dating back to its 2023 home opener; he had hoped for improvement for the 2025 season with more favorable time slots. On average, the attendance number dipped from the XFL's 2023 season average of 14,703 to 13,512. While the Battlehawks averaged 34,365 fans per game, the other seven teams averaged only 9,751, and the Defenders Audi Field was the only other venue who drew more than 50% full on average.

In an interview after the season Head of Football Operations Daryl Johnston said: "With our home markets, we've got to build that trust there—that we're not going to leave or [that] the league isn't going to fold. We've got a couple cities that historically have been a part of spring football, they've committed to a team and that team has left. ... We've still got some trust to build in our home markets. We are going to be able to dial into the details. We're going to have a traditional offseason calendar where we can be ahead of the curve instead of being in a position where we have to chase it a little bit".

== Awards ==
=== Players of the week ===
In the 2020 XFL season, the league awarded a weekly award called "The Star of the Week". In the 2022 and 2023 USFL seasons, the league awarded Offensive, Defensive, and Special Teams Players of the Week awards. During the 2024 season, the UFL has not posted official player of the week awards. However, similar to the 2023 XFL season, some independent media companies recognized offensive, defensive, and special teams players each week.

After not awarding "Players of the Week" awards in the first two weeks, The UFLPA filed a grievance challenging the UFL's decision, claiming its a violation of the league's collective bargaining agreement.

==== Sports Illustrated ====
Week	Offensive Player			Defensive Player			Special Teams Player (Note: PFF awarded the "Offensive Line" award while UFLBoard and SI.com gave the "Special Teams Player" award.)			Refs.
Week	Player	Pos.	Team	Player	Pos.	Team	Player	Pos.	Team	Refs.
1	Chase Garbers	QB	Brahmas	Daniel Wise	DT	Panthers	Jake Bates	K	Panthers	
2	Marcell Ateman	WR	Battlehawks	Taco Charlton	DE	Stallions	Chris Blewitt	K	Stallions	
3	Adrian Martinez	QB	Stallions	Carlos Davis	DT	Stallions	Andre Szmyt	K	Battlehawks	
4	Jacob Saylors	RB	Battlehawks	Jordan Mosley	S	Brahmas	Ramiz Ahmed	K	Stallions	
5	Hakeem Butler	WR	Battlehawks	Malik Fisher	DE	Defenders	Marquette King	P	Renegades	
6	Adrian Martinez (2)	QB	Stallions	Michael Joseph	CB	Defenders	Jake Bates (2)	K	Panthers	
7	Adrian Martinez (3)	QB	Stallions	Willie Harvey	LB	Battlehawks	J.J. Molson	K	Roughnecks	
8	Adrian Martinez (4)	QB	Stallions	DeMarquis Gates	LB	Stallions	Matt White	P	Showboats	
9	Bryce Perkins	QB	Panthers	Breeland Speaks	DE	Panthers	Brad Wing	P	Brahmas	
10	Luis Perez	QB	Renegades	Markel Roby	S	Roughnecks	Chris Rowland	WR	Defenders	
Conference Championship	Anthony McFarland	RB	Brahmas	Javin White	LB	Panthers	Brad Wing (2)	P	Brahmas	

==== Pro Football Focus ====
Week	Offensive Player			Defensive Player			Offensive Line	Refs.
Week	Player	Pos.	Team	Player	Pos.	Team	Team	Refs.
1	Wes Hills	RB	Panthers	Darius Phillips	CB	Brahmas	Battlehawks	
2	Mataeo Durant	RB	Battlehawks	Dondrea Tillman	DE	Stallions	Renegades	
3	Deon Cain	WR	Stallions	Jonathan Garvin	LB	Stallions	Renegades	
4	Justin Smith	WR	Brahmas	Wyatt Ray	LB	Brahmas	Stallions	
5	Adrian Martinez	QB	Stallions	Breeland Speaks	DE	Panthers	Brahmas	
6	Adrian Martinez (2)	QB	Stallions	Michael Joseph	CB	Defenders	Defenders	
7	Luis Perez	QB	Renegades	Vic Beasley	DE	Renegades	Stallions	
8	Cody Latimer	WR	Brahmas	Jonathan Garvin (2)	DE	Stallions	Brahmas	
9	Luis Perez (2)	QB	Renegades	Markel Roby	S	Roughnecks	Defenders	
10	Siaosi Mariner	WR	Panthers	Dondrea Tillman	DE	Stallions	Roughnecks	

==== UFLBoard.com ====
Week	Offensive Player			Defensive Player			Special Teams Player			Refs.
Week	Player	Pos.	Team	Player	Pos.	Team	Player	Pos.	Team	Refs.
1	Chase Garbers	QB	Brahmas	Reuben Foster	LB	Roughnecks	Jake Bates	K	Panthers	
2	Marcell Ateman	WR	Battlehawks	Taco Charlton	DE	Stallions	Jake Bates (2)	K	Panthers	
3	Adrian Martinez	QB	Stallions	Carlos Davis	DT	Stallions	Matt McCrane	K	Defenders	
4	A. J. McCarron	QB	Battlehawks	Jordan Mosley	S	Brahmas	Ramiz Ahmed	K	Stallions	
5	Hakeem Butler	WR	Battlehawks	Breeland Speaks	DE	Panthers	Andre Szmyt	K	Battlehawks	
6	Adrian Martinez (2)	QB	Stallions	Michael Joseph	CB	Defenders	Jake Bates (3)	K	Panthers	
7	Luis Perez	QB	Renegades	Wille Harvey	LB	Battlehawks	J.J. Molson	K	Roughnecks	
8	Anthony McFarland	RB	Brahmas	Qwynnterrio Cole	S	Battlehawks	Gary Jennings	K	Stallions	
9	Bryce Perkins	QB	Panthers	Breeland Speaks	DE	Panthers	Brad Wing	P	Brahmas	
10	Luis Perez (2)	QB	Renegades	Willie Harvey (2)	LB	Battlehawks	Chris Rowland	K	Defenders	

=== Season Awards ===
Season Awards
Award	Winner	Position	Team	Ref.
Coach of the Year	Mike Nolan	HC	Panthers	
Most Valuable Player	Adrian Martinez	QB	Stallions	
Offensive Player of the Year	Hakeem Butler	WR	Battlehawks	
Defensive Player of the Year	Breeland Speaks	DE	Panthers	
Special Teams Player of the Year	Chris Garrett	LB	Battlehawks	
Sportsman of the Year	Darius Victor	RB	Showboats	

All-UFL Team
Position	Player	Team
QB	Adrian Martinez	Stallions
RB	Jacob Saylors	Battlehawks
WR	Hakeem Butler	Battlehawks
WR	Daewood Davis	Showboats
WR	Marcus Simms	Panthers
TE	Jace Sternberger	Stallions
OT	Jaryd Jones-Smith	Battlehawks
OT	Bobby Evans	Renegades
OG	Zack Johnson	Stallions
OG	Kohl Levao	Brahmas
C	Mike Panasiuk	Battlehawks
DL	Carlos Davis	Stallions
DL	Daniel Wise	Panthers
EDGE/OLB	Chris Odom	Roughnecks
EDGE/OLB	Breeland Speaks	Panthers
ILB	Tavante Beckett	Brahmas
ILB	Willie Harvey	Battlehawks
CB	Deandre Baker	Defenders
CB	Nate Brooks	Panthers
CB	Ajene Harris	Renegades
S	Kai Nacua	Panthers
S	A. J. Thomas	Stallions
K	Jake Bates	Panthers
P	Marquette King	Renegades
LS	Jordan Ober	Panthers
RS	Chris Rowland	Defenders

== Statistical leaders ==
2024 UFL statistical leaders
Category	Player	Team	Stat
Offense
Passing yards	Luis Perez	Renegades	2,309
Passing Touchdowns	Luis Perez	Renegades	18
Rushing yards	Adrian Martinez	Stallions	528
Rushing Touchdowns	Ricky Person Jr.	Stallions	6
Receptions	Jontre Kirklin	Brahmas	56
Receptions	Justin Hall	Roughnecks	56
Receiving yards	Hakeem Butler	Battlehawks	652
Receiving Touchdowns	Sal Cannella	Renegades	6
All-Purpose Yards	Chris Rowland	Defenders	1,657
Touchdowns Scored	Jacob Saylors	Battlehawks	8
Defense
Tackles	Willie Harvey	Battlehawks	78
Sacks	Breeland Speaks	Panthers	9.5
Interceptions	A. J. Thomas	Stallions	3
Interceptions	Markel Roby	Roughnecks	3
Interceptions	Kai Nacua	Panthers	3
Interceptions	Kameron Kelly	Battlehawks	3
Special teams
Return yards	Amari Rodgers	Stallions	281
Field goals made	Andre Szmyt	Battlehawks	19
Punting yards	Brock Miller	Panthers	1,727

== League finances ==
The league was created as a "merger of equals", with the respective leagues' owners assuming 50% ownership of the newly formed UFL. RedBird Capital Partners owner Gerry Cardinale called it "a tremendous opportunity to achieve something unique. A legitimate shot at becoming one of the top professional leagues in the country after the big four leagues".

In March, Under Armour announced they extended the multi-year agreement signed in 2023 with the XFL. Later that month, Michael Strahan's MSX brand was announced as the "Official Off-Field Apparel Partner". Other UFL's sponsors include: Westgate Resorts, Progressive Insurance, PepsiCo (Gatorade), The Coca-Cola Company (Simply Spiked), CBD Kratom, and Molson Coors. Johnson and Garcia also use the league to promote their own brands, Teremana Tequila and ZOA Energy Drink. On April 6, 2024, the league announced a partnership with the United States Army, who paid an estimated $10–11 million for jersey patch sponsorship and other promotional considerations. It was later reported that the Army was looking to recoup $6 million from the deal, after the partnership allegedly caused a decline in recruitment; the Army stated in January 2025 that such reports misrepresented the nature of the contract (in which the payment did not take place until after the season ended, and thus the Army, through its advertising agent DDB Worldwide. instead reduced its sponsorship payout after Johnson failed to deliver on personal social media posts as part of the agreement). The Army also stated that claims of the sponsorship causing a decline in recruitment were completely false.

In April Upper Deck announced they'll release "2024 UFL Game Dated Moments Cards". Beginning with the conference championships, the league signed a partnership with Underdog Fantasy Sports to be the league's official fantasy partner, replacing a previous deal that the XFL had held with DraftKings during McMahon's ownership.

St. Louis Battlehawks signed a sponsorship agreement with Budweiser. The sponsorship returns Anheuser-Busch to the league, after it had sponsored the XFL in 2020 to promote Bud Light Seltzer. In March, Flux announced a multi-year sponsorship with the D.C. Defenders and St. Louis Battlehawks.

=== Personnel ===
- Dany Garcia: Chairwoman
- Russ Brandon: President/Chief Executive Officer
- Daryl Johnston: Executive Vice President of Football Operations
- Doug Whaley: Senior Vice President of Player Personnel
- Russ Giglio: Senior Director, Player Administration and Officiating Operations
- Jim Popp: Director of Player Administration

== Media ==
=== Television ===
In the United States, the television rights for the UFL is held by Fox and ESPN (which is under its second season of a five-year deal), which held the rights to the USFL and XFL, respectively. NBC Sports, which had shared broadcast rights to the USFL with Fox Sports in 2022 and 2023, will not carry UFL games due to an increase in schedule conflicts, stemming from the proposed start date being slightly earlier than 2022 and 2023. There had been one year remaining on NBC's contract.

Fox Sports' regular-season coverage includes pairs of regional games in Weeks 4, 5, and 9 on Fox, (with out of market games available to watch on the Fox Sports App), 13 national games on Fox, and FS1 carrying one live game and same-week encore presentations of previous Fox telecasts throughout the season. The ESPN networks' regular-season coverage includes 9 games on ABC, 10 games on ESPN, and one game on ESPN2. Sixty-three percent of all UFL games will air on broadcast television (ABC or Fox) and 25% of the remaining games will air on the ESPN flagship network. ABC and Fox will also each air a semifinal game. Per a two year rotation with ABC and Fox (ABC takes place of NBC in the championship rotation), Fox aired the 2024 UFL Championship Game. In addition, games on the ESPN networks will be streamed live on ESPN+. ESPN will also air a weekly multi-platform post-game show. Eight of Fox's games will be simulcast on its Spanish language outlet Fox Deportes, along with select ESPN games on ESPN Deportes.

On demand access to games on ESPN networks will be available for a limited time on ESPN+, along with Fox broadcast network games on Tubi.

Curt Menefee and Joel Klatt, who served as Fox's lead broadcast team for the XFL and USFL since 2020, continued in that capacity in 2024. ESPN leading crew featured Mike Monaco or Drew Carter (alternating throughout the season), Sam Acho, Stormy Buonantony and Cole Cubelic.

Through the first eight weeks of the season, the UFL's broadcast partners had sold $3.7 million in in-game commercial inventory at an average of $6,750 per advertisement; in addition to the UFL's league sponsors, regular television sponsors included Jersey Mike's, T-Mobile, IBM, Liberty Mutual and Subway, among numerous pharmaceuticals. Most of the advertising was purchased as part of bulk agreements with Fox Sports and ESPN Inc. as the league was not believed to be popular enough to warrant separate advertising purchases, an arrangement that will continue in 2025.

Brahmas kicker Donald De La Haye features the league in his Web series Project NFL, which is featured on his YouTube channel, Deestroying.

==== Viewership ====
The inaugural season of the UFL averaged 832,000 viewers per game this season, a 34% increase from the average of 619,000 viewers the USFL and XFL attracted last year. The championship game on Fox drew the highest viewership with 1.596 million viewers. While the UFL games were drawing more viewers than the NHL, Fox Sports CEO Eric Shanks said: "Ratings are strong, especially considering where this is carving out its space, but the ratings aren't big enough yet where this is its own individual upfront [commercial packages] buy".

In millions of viewers

Broadcaster	1	2	3	4	5	6	7	8	9	10	Conference finals	Championship game	Total	Average
ABC	–	0.9	1.0	1.0	–	1.0	–	1.1	0.9	0.9	1.1	–	10.0	1.0
ABC	–	–	1.0	–	–	–	–	–	1.1	–	–	–	10.0	1.0
ESPN	1.0	0.7	0.5	–	0.7	–	0.6	–	–	0.8	–	–	7.2	0.7
ESPN	0.7	0.9	–	–	–	–	0.7	–	–	–	–	–	7.2	0.7
ESPN	–	–	–	–	–	–	0.6	–	–	–	–	–	7.2	0.7
ESPN2	–	–	–	–	–	–	–	0.3	–	–	–	–	0.3	0.3
Fox	1.2	0.9	0.8	1.0	0.8	0.8	0.8	0.7	0.8	0.8	1.3	1.6	19.6	0.9
Fox	1.4	–	–	1.0	0.8	0.9	–	0.6	0.8	0.7	–	–	19.6	0.9
Fox	–	–	–	–	0.7	1.2	–	–	–	–	–	–	19.6	0.9
FS1	–	–	–	0.2	–	–	–	–	–	–	–	–	0.2	0.2
Total	4.3	3.4	3.3	3.2	3.0	3.9	2.7	2.7	3.6	3.2	2.4	1.6	37.3	
Average	1.1	0.9	0.8	0.8	0.8	1.0	0.7	0.7	0.9	0.8	1.2	1.6		0.9

* One decimal place is shown in table but two decimal places are used in all calculations.
* Viewership figures for games streaming on ESPN+ were not released.

=== Radio ===
Both ESPN and Fox will carry audio simulcasts of their coverage on their Sirius XM Radio feeds, ESPN Xtra and Fox Sports Radio, respectively. Among local affiliates, Memphis Showboats games will air on Memphis radio station WKIM (FM 98.9).

== Reception ==
The UFL announcement was the number one story the week after its merger in St. Louis.

Writing for ProFootballTalk, Mike Florio was skeptical of the league's long-term odds given the history of spring football and attendance figures he saw as mediocre, while acknowledging "The U.F.L. (New York Times-style) can be F.U.N." citing a fake field goal in which punter/holder Brad Wing threw a touchdown pass to Alex Mollette, the team's center who was lined up as a tackle eligible. Later in the season, Florio noted that improved television ratings and league stability had shown that the UFL was "laying the foundation to survive longer than most alternate pro football leagues." Jeff Kerr of CBS Sports lamented the lack of offensive output in Week 1 (noting a lack of effective running back play), while praising exciting special teams play, mentioning the Wing-to-Mollette touchdown and Jake Bates's 64-yard game-winning field goal; Kerr surmised that the league would need to improve its offensive line play. USA Today writer Jim Reineking noted that the former USFL squads, in general, seemed to have the upper hand in the opening week contests, while criticizing the league's decision to use the USFL rules on kickoffs (while acknowledging that the more conventional USFL formation did provide ample opportunity for returns) and starting the season around the crowded Easter holiday, arguing that the league would have been better served launching in the post-Super Bowl window as the XFL traditionally did. Barstool Sports declared "The UFL is risen!" with writer Clem crediting the Wing-to-Mollette play and Bates's field goal for reigniting his interest in spring football. SB Nation wrote of the Wing-to-Mollette play: "This is why we come to the UFL. For moments like this, plays like this. This is what makes football great."

On April 12, 2024, the Pro Football Hall of Fame started displaying the official game ball that was used by Michigan Panthers kicker Jake Bates, who converted a go-ahead 64-yard field goal with three seconds left, leading Michigan to an 18–16 victory over the St. Louis Battlehawks. The PFHOF was later also honored the Birmingham Stallions, after winning the league championship.

== Signees to the NFL ==
NFL teams were permitted to request tryouts of UFL players beginning the day following a players' club's last game of the season, including playoffs. NFL teams could also negotiate with the players, but were unable to sign the player until June 18, two days after the conclusion of the UFL Championship Game.

Seventy-seven UFL players signed with the NFL for their 2024 preseason; of those, only two—Jake Bates and Jalen Redmond—survived roster cuts to make an NFL Week 1 roster.

Legend
	Made an NFL team (active, practice squad or PUP)
**Bold**	Made the active roster

Player	Position	UFL team	NFL team(s)	Ref.
Ramiz Ahmed	K	Birmingham Stallions	Washington Commanders	
**Jake Bates**	K	Michigan Panthers	Detroit Lions	
Daewood Davis	WR	Memphis Showboats	Carolina Panthers	
Willie Harvey Jr.	LB	St. Louis Battlehawks	Dallas Cowboys	
Gareon Conley	CB	DC Defenders	Dallas Cowboys	
**Jalen Redmond**	DT	Arlington Renegades	Minnesota Vikings	
Jalen Dalton	DE	San Antonio Brahmas	Dallas Cowboys	
Liam Fornadel	OG	DC Defenders	New England Patriots	
Jacob Saylors	RB	St. Louis Battlehawks	New York Giants/Cleveland Browns	
Kohl Levao	OG	San Antonio Brahmas	New York Jets	
Jaryd Jones-Smith	OT	St. Louis Battlehawks	Atlanta Falcons	
Prince Emili	DT	San Antonio Brahmas	Atlanta Falcons	
**Dondrea Tillman**	OLB	Birmingham Stallions	Denver Broncos	
Ricky Person Jr.	RB	Birmingham Stallions	Seattle Seahawks	
Malik Fisher	DE	DC Defenders	Houston Texans	
**Kevin Austin Jr.**	WR	Birmingham Stallions	New Orleans Saints	
Nehemiah Shelton	CB	Memphis Showboats	New York Jets/Los Angeles Chargers	
Marcus Simms	WR	Michigan Panthers	Seattle Seahawks	
Javin White	LB	Michigan Panthers	Chicago Bears	
Chim Okorafor	OT	Michigan Panthers	Cleveland Browns	
Julien Davenport	OT	San Antonio Brahmas	Atlanta Falcons	
Ty Scott	WR	DC Defenders	Seattle Seahawks	
Sal Cannella	TE	Arlington Renegades	Tampa Bay Buccaneers	
Kiondre Thomas	CB	Houston Roughnecks	Carolina Panthers/Pittsburgh Steelers	
Nate Brooks	CB	Michigan Panthers	Cincinnati Bengals	
Hakeem Butler	WR	St. Louis BattleHawks	Cincinnati Bengals	
Deontay Burnett	WR	Arlington Renegades	Dallas Cowboys	
Adrian Martinez	QB	Birmingham Stallions	New York Jets	
Kelvin Harmon	WR	DC Defenders	Dallas Cowboys	
Josiah Bronson	DT	Memphis Showboats	New England Patriots	
Zack Johnson	OG	Birmingham Stallions	Cleveland Browns	
Levi Bell	DE	Michigan Panthers	Indianapolis Colts	
Jordan Thomas	TE	Birmingham Stallions	Atlanta Falcons	
Jacob Burton	OL	Michigan Panthers	Detroit Lions	
Isaiah Winstead	WR	Arlington Renegades	New York Jets	
A.J. Thomas	S	Birmingham Stallions	New England Patriots	
Brandon Smith	WR	DC Defenders	New York Jets	
Samson Nacua	WR	Michigan Panthers	New Orleans Saints	
Delonte Hood	CB	Arlington Renegades	Arizona Cardinals	
Matt Kaskey	OG	Birmingham Stallions	Los Angeles Rams	
Alec Lindstrom	OL	Memphis Showboats	Los Angeles Rams	
Mike Rose	LB	St. Louis Battlehawks	New Orleans Saints	
Luis Perez	QB	Arlington Renegades	Los Angeles Chargers	
Armani Taylor-Prioleau	OT	Birmingham Stallions	Washington Commanders	
Zach Morton	LB	San Antonio Brahmas	Green Bay Packers	
Jontre Kirklin	WR	San Antonio Brahmas	San Francisco 49ers	
Carlos Davis	DT	Birmingham Stallions	Cincinnati Bengals	
Breeland Speaks	DE	Michigan Panthers	Jacksonville Jaguars	
**Rex Sunahara**	LS	San Antonio Brahmas	Cleveland Browns	
Jonathan Garvin	DE	Birmingham Stallions	San Francisco 49ers	
Walter Palmore	DT	Michigan Panthers	Carolina Panthers	
Wyatt Ray	OLB	San Antonio Brahmas	Miami Dolphins	
Anthony Hines	LB	DC Defenders	New York Jets	
Deon Cain	WR	Birmingham Stallions	Buffalo Bills/Carolina Panthers	
Storey Jackson	LB	Arlington Renegades	Atlanta Falcons	
Cohl Cabral	OL	Michigan Panthers	Dallas Cowboys	
Nate McCrary	RB	Michigan Panthers	Green Bay Packers	
Matt Corral	QB	Birmingham Stallions	Minnesota Vikings	
Jaylen Twyman	DT	San Antonio Brahmas	New York Jets	
Justin Hall	WR	Houston Roughnecks	Minnesota Vikings	
Frank Ginda	LB	Michigan Panthers	Los Angeles Chargers	
Mike Panasiuk	C	St. Louis Battlehawks	Indianapolis Colts	
Anthony McFarland	RB	San Antonio Brahmas	Miami Dolphins	
Joel Iyiegbuniwe	LB	San Antonio Brahmas	Detroit Lions	
Kyahva Tezino	LB	Birmingham Stallions	Pittsburgh Steelers	
T.J. Carter	DE	Michigan Panthers	Arizona Cardinals	
E. J. Perry	QB	Michigan Panthers	Jacksonville Jaguars	
Chris Garrett	LB	St. Louis Battlehawks	Arizona Cardinals	
Marvin Moody	LB	Houston Roughnecks	Cleveland Browns	
Sage Surratt	TE	Memphis Showboats	Arizona Cardinals	
DaShaun White	LB	Michigan Panthers	Las Vegas Raiders/San Francisco 49ers	
Chuck Filiaga	OL	San Antonio Brahmas	Minnesota Vikings	
Keonte Schad	DT	Houston Roughnecks	Green Bay Packers	
Matt McCrane	K	DC Defenders	Detroit Lions	
**Andre Szmyt**	K	St. Louis Battlehawks	Cleveland Browns	
Mikel Jones	LB	DC Defenders	Tennessee Titans	
