= 2026 Birmingham Stallions season =

American professional football season

- Owner: Alpha Acquico, LLC
- Head coach: A. J. McCarron
- Home stadium: Protective Stadium

Results
- Record: 4–6
- Conference place: 6th in UFL
- Playoffs: Did not qualify

Uniform
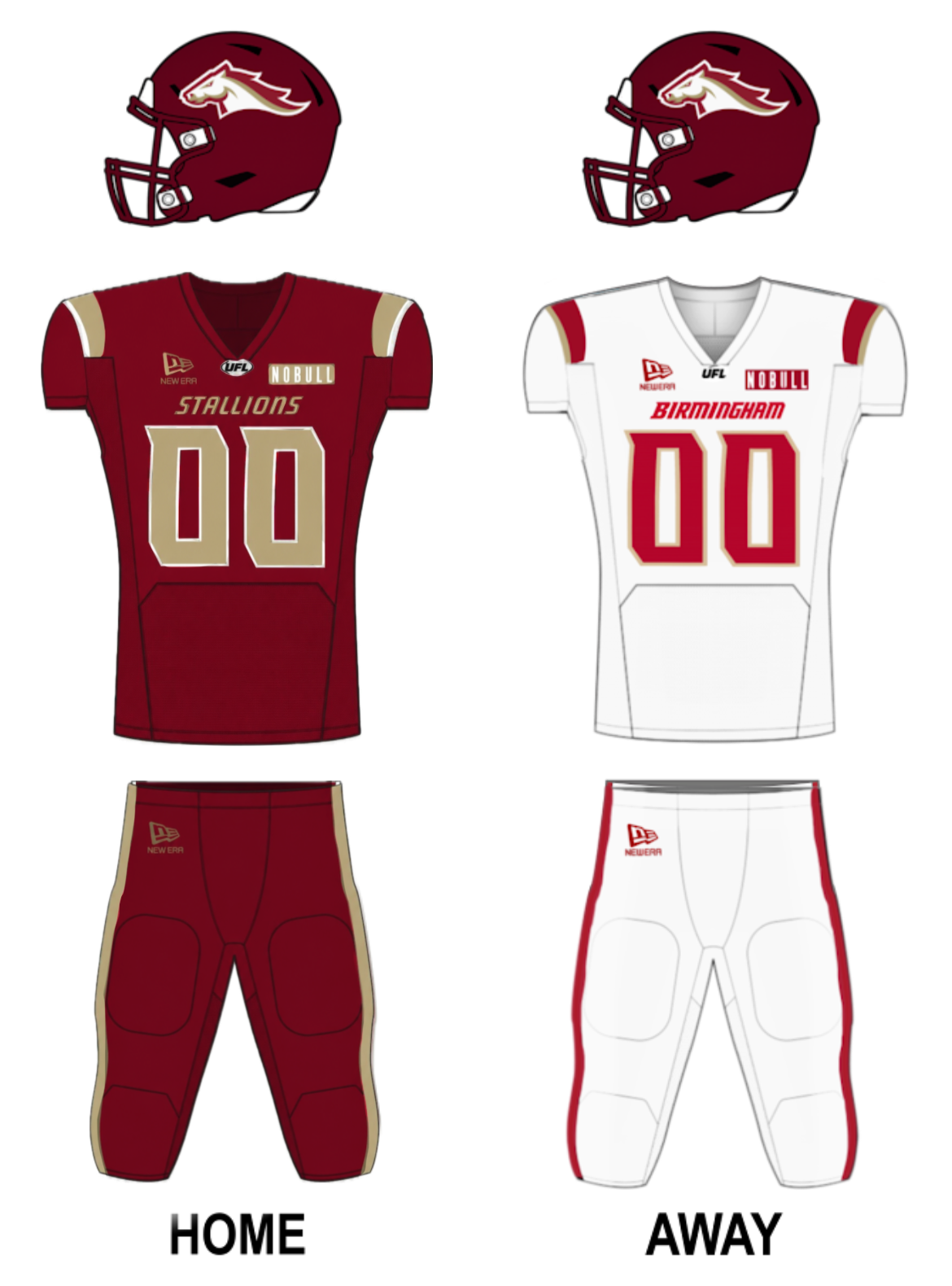

The 2026 Birmingham Stallions season was the fifth season for the Birmingham Stallions and their third in the UFL. The Stallions failed to improve from their 7–3 record from last season following their Week 4 shutout loss to the expansion team, the Orlando Storm, which was the first regular season shutout in UFL history. They also failed to match it following a Week 5 loss to the defending UFL champions, the DC Defenders, which was also played at home. With a loss to the Columbus Aviators in Week 9, they recorded the first losing season in team history, as well as their worst record in franchise history. Their loss to the Houston Gamblers in Week 10 eliminated the Stallions from playoff contention, missing the playoffs for the first time in franchise history.

== Offseason ==
=== Coaching Changes ===
On December 18, 2025, A. J. McCarron would be hired as the head coach of the Stallions, replacing Skip Holtz. On February 23, 2026, the Stallions announced their full 2026 coaching staff.

=== Draft ===
Teams were allowed to protect up to 12 players from their 2025 rosters.

== Staff ==
Birmingham Stallions staff
Head coach: Head coach – A. J. McCarron; Offensive coaches: Offensive coordinator – Tyler Siskey; Running backs – Thomas Singley; Wide receivers – Cody Latimer; Offensive line – Mike Goff	Defensive coaches: Defensive coordinator – Kevin Sherrer; Defensive line – Damion Square; Linebackers – Daric Riley; Defensive backs – Travis Pearson

== Final roster ==
2026 Birmingham Stallions final roster
Quarterbacks: 7 Michael Hiers; 18 Donovan Smith; 2 Dorian Thompson-Robinson; Running backs: 24 Snoop Conner; 9 Tyrion Davis-Price; 5 Anthony McFarland Jr.; Wide receivers: 80 Jabre Barber; 8 Deon Cain; 86 Elijah Cooks; 11 Daewood Davis; 0 Kyric McGowan; 12 Jaydon Mickens; 88 Justyn Ross; 17 Marlon Williams; Tight ends: 84 Tyler Davis; 81 Jordan Thomas	Offensive linemen: 62 Andrew Carter G; 77 Brian Dooley T; 59 Adrian Ealy T; 69 Noah Henderson T; 53 Noah Johnson C; 68 Zack Johnson G; 76 Joey Lombard G/C; 74 Preston Wilson G; Defensive linemen: 96 T. J. Carter DT; 90 Randy Charlton DE; 94 Isaiah Coe DT; 91 Ricky Correia DT; 52 Kobe Jones DE; 92 Jayden Peevy DT	Linebackers: 20 Tae Crowder; 33 Olakunle Fatukasi; 50 Izayah Green-May; 54 Dyontae Johnson; 31 Kyahva Tezino; 99 Isaac Ukwu; Defensive backs: 3 Lance Boykin CB; 14 Hudson Clark FS; 30 Alex Cook SS; 25 Bump Cooper Jr. CB; 23 Lukas Denis SS; 22 Steven Gilmore Jr. CB; 16 Mario Goodrich CB; 6 Clarence Lewis CB; 19 Shaquan Loyal FS; 21 Tre Norwood FS; 29 Davion Ross CB; Special teams: 26 Anders Carlson K; 27 Ryan Langan LS; 15 Colby Wadman P	Reserve lists: 43 DaRon Gilbert LB (IR); 73 Armani Taylor-Prioleau T (IR); 4 JoJo Tillery FS (IR); 50 active, 3 inactive

== Schedule ==
All times Central

Week	Day	Date	Kickoff	TV	Opponent	Results		Location	Attendance
Week	Day	Date	Kickoff	TV	Opponent	Score	Record	Location	Attendance
1	Friday	March 27	7:00 p.m.	Fox	at Louisville Kings	W 15–13	1–0	Lynn Family Stadium	14,034
2	Sunday	April 5	5:00 p.m.	NFL Network	at Houston Gamblers	L 20–22	1–1	Shell Energy Stadium	7,744
3	Sunday	April 12	2:00 p.m.	ABC	at St. Louis Battlehawks	L 30–34	1–2	The Dome at America's Center	20,209
4	Saturday	April 18	3:00 p.m.	Fox	Orlando Storm	L 0–16	1–3	Protective Stadium	18,340
5	Friday	April 24	7:00 p.m.	Fox	DC Defenders	L 28–45	1–4	Protective Stadium	8,120
6	Sunday	May 3	3:00 p.m.	Fox	at Orlando Storm	W 20–17	2–4	Inter&Co Stadium	9,107
7	Saturday	May 9	7:00 p.m.	ESPN	Dallas Renegades	W 21–17 (OT)	3–4	Protective Stadium	4,705
8	Sunday	May 17	12:00 p.m.	Fox	Columbus Aviators	W 14–3	4–4	Protective Stadium	4,824
9	Saturday	May 23	2:00 p.m.	ABC	at Columbus Aviators	L 29–36	4–5	Historic Crew Stadium	9,127
10	Saturday	May 30	2:00 p.m.	ESPN2	Houston Gamblers	L 13–26	4–6	Protective Stadium	5,253

=== Game summaries ===
==== Week 1: at Louisville Kings ====
Week 1: Birmingham Stallions at Louisville Kings – Game summary

Quarter	1	2	3	4	Total
Stallions	6	3	0	6	15
Kings	7	0	3	3	13

at Lynn Family Stadium • Louisville, Kentucky

- Date: March 27
- Game time: 7:00 p.m. CDT
- Game weather: Partly cloudy, 46 °F (8 °C)
- Game attendance: 14,034
- Referee: James Carter
- TV announcers (Fox): Curt Menefee, Joel Klatt and Jake Butt
- Game Book

Game information

First quarter

- BIR – Snoop Conner 5-yard run (kick failed), 9:00. Stallions 6–0. Drive: 6 plays, 43 yards, 3:30.
- LOU – Lucky Jackson 12-yard pass from Jason Bean (Tanner Brown kick), 2:48. Kings 7–6. Drive: 10 plays • 72 yards • 6:13

Second quarter

- BIR – Jonathan Garibay 31-yard field goal, 3:50. Stallions 9–7. Drive: 13 plays • 66 yards • 7:39

Third quarter

- LOU – Tanner Brown 37-yard field goal, 4:56. Kings 10–9. Drive: 6 plays • 51 yards • 2:35

Fourth quarter

- LOU – Tanner Brown 20-yard field goal, 8:42. Kings 13–9. Drive: 8 plays • 63 yards • 4:38
- BIR – Justyn Ross 14-yard pass from Matt Corral (kick failed), 2:00. Stallions 15–13. Drive: 13 plays • 66 yards • 6:42

Top passers

- BIR – Matt Corral – 21/30, 208 yards, TD
- LOU – Jason Bean – 14/27, 226 yards, TD, 2 INT

Top rushers

- BIR – Snoop Conner – 16 rushes, 56 yards, TD
- LOU – Jason Bean – 5 rushes, 27 yards

Top receivers

- BIR – Jaydon Mickens – 9 receptions, 103 yards
- LOU – Lucky Jackson – 6 receptions, 73 yards, TD

==== Week 2: at Houston Gamblers ====
Week 2: Birmingham Stallions at Houston Gamblers – Game summary

Quarter	1	2	3	4	Total
Stallions	0	7	7	6	20
Gamblers	0	6	3	13	22

at Shell Energy Stadium • Houston, Texas

- Date: April 5
- Game time: 5:00 p.m. CDT
- Game weather: Overcast, 66 °F (19 °C)
- Game attendance: 7,745
- Referee: Kole Knueppel
- TV announcers (NFL Network): Mark Jones, Kirk Morrison, Cole Cubelic and Harry Douglas
- Game Book

Game information

First quarter

- No scoring plays

Second quarter

- HOU – John Hoyland 32-yard field goal, 5:54. Gamblers 3–0. Drive: 13 plays • 44 yards • 7:09
- HOU – John Hoyland 37-yard field goal, 1:11. Gamblers 6–0. Drive: 8 plays • 49 yards • 2:46
- BIR – Jaydon Mickens 6-yard pass from Matt Corral (Jonathan Garibay kick), 0:24. Stallions 7–6. Drive: 6 plays • 60 yards • 0:47

Third quarter

- BIR – Deon Cain 12-yard pass from Matt Corral (Jonathan Garibay kick), 11:11. Stallions 14–6. Drive: 7 plays • 63 yards • 3:49
- HOU – John Hoyland 26-yard field goal, 6:22. Stallions 14–9. Drive: 9 plays • 61 yards • 4:49

Fourth quarter

- HOU – John Hoyland 24-yard field goal, 14:56. Stallions 14–12. Drive: 9 plays • 68 yards • 4:35
- HOU – Jalen White 3-yard run (John Hoyland kick), 6:57. Gamblers 19–14. Drive: 14 plays • 57 yards • 7:10
- BIR – Anthony McFarland Jr. 1-yard run (two-point pass failed), 2:02. Stallions 20–19. Drive: 9 plays • 59 yards • 4:55
- HOU – John Hoyland 50-yard field goal, 0:00. Gamblers 22–20. Drive: 9 plays • 43 yards • 2:02

Top passers

- BIR – Matt Corral – 21/27, 226 yards, 2 INT
- HOU – Nolan Henderson – 15/23, 186 yards

Top rushers

- BIR – Anthony McFarland Jr. – 7 rushes, 37 yards, TD
- HOU – Jalen White – 26 rushes, 82 yards, TD

Top receivers

- BIR – Justyn Ross – 5 receptions, 70 yards
- HOU – Jontre Kirklin – 5 receptions, 85 yards

==== Week 3: at St. Louis Battlehawks ====
Week 3: Birmingham Stallions at St. Louis Battlehawks – Game summary

Quarter	1	2	3	4	Total
Stallions	0	7	16	7	30
Battlehawks	10	3	0	21	34

at The Dome at America's Center • St. Louis, Missouri

- Date: April 12
- Game time: 2:00 p.m. CDT
- Game weather: Sunny, 78 °F (26 °C)
- Game attendance: 20,209
- Referee: Jason Autrey
- TV announcers (ABC): Joe Tessitore, Jordan Rodgers, Brock Osweiler and Sam Acho
- Game Book

Game information

First quarter

- STL – Jordan Williams 10-yard interception return (Tucker McCann kick), 12:19. Battlehawks 7–0.
- STL – Tucker McCann 54-yard field goal, 1:03. Battlehawks 10–0. Drive: 9 plays • 16 yards • 5:23

Second quarter

- BIR – Jordan Thomas 35-yard pass from Matt Corral (Jonathan Garibay kick), 8:19. Battlehawks 10–7. Drive: 1 plays • 35 yards • 0:09
- STL – Tucker McCann 40-yard field goal, 1:51. Battlehawks 13–7. Drive: 4 plays • -10 yards • 0:54

Third quarter

- BIR – Jonathan Garibay 34-yard field goal, 11:32. Battlehawks 13–10. Drive: 7 plays • 51 yards • 3:28
- BIR – Mario Goodrich 40-yard interception return (kick failed), 11:21. Stallions 16–13.
- BIR – Anthony McFarland Jr. 1-yard run (Jonathan Garibay kick), 6:21. Stallions 23–13. Drive: 6 plays • 34 yards • 3:37

Fourth quarter

- STL – Steven McBride 2-yard pass from Harrison Frost (Tucker McCann kick), 13:52. Stallions 23–20. Drive: 5 plays • 40 yards • 1:36
- BIR – Deon Cain 67-yard pass from Matt Corral (Jonathan Garibay kick), 12:23. Stallions 30–20. Drive: 3 plays • 80 yards • 1:29
- STL – Hakeem Butler 64-yard pass from Harrison Frost (Tucker McCann kick), 11:20. Stallions 30–27. Drive: 2 plays • 64 yards • 1:03
- STL – Tyler Neville 11-yard pass from Harrison Frost (Tucker McCann kick), 1:52. Battlehawks 34–30. Drive: 12 plays • 75 yards • 6:01

Top passers

- BIR – Matt Corral – 16/33, 252 yards, 2 TD, 2 INT
- STL – Harrison Ford – 9/15, 148 yards, 2 INT

Top rushers

- BIR – Anthony McFarland Jr. – 13 rushes, 56 yards, TD
- STL – Kevon Latulas – 8 rushes, 30 yards

Top receivers

- BIR – Justyn Ross – 4 receptions, 36 yards
- STL – Hakeem Butler – 4 receptions, 146 yards, TD

==== Week 4: vs. Orlando Storm ====
Week 4: Orlando Storm at Birmingham Stallions – Game summary

Quarter	1	2	3	4	Total
Storm	7	6	0	3	16
Stallions	0	0	0	0	0

at Protective Stadium • Birmingham, Alabama

- Date: April 18
- Game time: 3:00 p.m. CDT
- Game weather: Partly cloudy, 82 °F (28 °C)
- Game attendance: 18,340
- Referee: Francisco Villar
- TV announcers (Fox): Kevin Kugler, Devin Gardner and Jenny Taft
- Game Book

Game information

First quarter

- ORL – Cam Camper 13-yard pass from Jack Plummer (Michael Lantz kick), 1:59. Storm 7–0. Drive: 9 plays • 72 yards • 5:24

Second quarter

- ORL – Michael Lantz 26-yard field goal, 7:33. Storm 10–0. Drive: 9 plays • 61 yards • 4:49
- ORL – Michael Lantz 46-yard field goal, 0:02. Storm 13–0. Drive: 6 plays • 41 yards • 0:28

Third quarter

- No scoring plays

Fourth quarter

- ORL – Michael Lantz 45-yard field goal, 12:18. Storm 16–0. Drive: 9 plays • 33 yards • 5:03

Top passers

- ORL – Jack Plummer – 17/27, 275 yards, TD
- BIR – Matt Corral – 13/20, 83 yards

Top rushers

- ORL – Jashaun Corbin – 18 rushes, 58 yards
- BIR – Anthony McFarland Jr. – 8 rushes, 30 yards

Top receivers

- ORL – Cam Camper – 4 receptions, 44 yards, TD
- BIR – Jaydon Mickens – 4 receptions, 35 yards

==== Week 5: vs. DC Defenders ====
Week 5: DC Defenders at Birmingham Stallions – Game summary

Quarter	1	2	3	4	Total
Defenders	7	14	17	7	45
Stallions	6	7	6	9	28

at Protective Stadium • Birmingham, Alabama

- Date: April 24
- Game time: 7:00 p.m. CDT
- Game weather: Partly cloudy, 58 °F (14 °C)
- Game attendance: 8,120
- Referee: Jason Autrey
- TV announcers (Fox): Kevin Kugler, Devin Gardner and Jenny Taft
- Game Book

Game information

First quarter

- DC – Javon Antonio 13-yard pass from Jordan Ta'amu (Matt McCrane kick), 11:21. Defenders 7–0. Drive: 6 plays • 28 yards • 3:39
- BIR – Deon Cain 12-yard pass from Dorian Thompson-Robinson (kick failed), 3:37. Defenders 7–6. Drive: 4 plays • 24 yards • 1:51

Second quarter

- DC – Xazavian Valladay 2-yard run (Matt McCrane kick), 6:21. Defenders 14–6. Drive: 8 plays • 33 yards • 4:20
- DC – Ty Scott 45-yard pass from Jordan Ta'amu (Matt McCrane kick), 4:07. Defenders 21–6 Drive: 1 plays • 45 yards • 0:10
- BIR – Jordan Thomas 1-yard pass from Dorian Thompson-Robinson (Anders Carlson kick), 0:24. Defenders 21–13. Drive: 11 plays • 80 yards • 3:43

Third quarter

- BIR – Snoop Conner 1-yard run (two-point pass failed), 13:01. Defenders 21–19. Drive: 4 plays • 68 yards • 1:59
- DC – Ty Scott 37-yard pass from Jordan Ta'amu (Matt McCrane kick), 8:13. Defenders 28–19. Drive: 8 plays • 69 yards • 4:48
- DC – Matt McCrane 47-yard field goal, 5:22. Defenders 31–19. Drive: 4 plays • 2 yards • 1:59
- DC – Xazavian Valladay 1-yard run (Matt McCrane kick), 0:55. Defenders 38–19. Drive: 5 plays • 59 yards • 2:20

Fourth quarter

- DC – Briley Moore 1-yard pass from Jordan Ta'amu (Matt McCrane kick), 8:18. Defenders 45–19. Drive: 7 plays • 53 yards • 4:26
- BIR – Dorian Thompson-Robinson 12-yard run (Dorian Thompson-Robinson–Jordan Thomas three-point pass), 1:53. Defenders 45–28. Drive: 13 plays • 76 yards • 6:25

Top passers

- DC – Jordan Ta'amu – 15/22, 275 yards, 4 TD
- BIR – Dorian Thompson-Robinson – 28/43, 313 yards, 2 TD, 2 INT

Top rushers

- DC – Xazavian Valladay – 8 rushes, 50 yards, 2 TD
- BIR – Dorian Thompson-Robinson – 4 rushes, 43 yards, TD

Top receivers

- DC – Ty Scott – 3 receptions, 84 yards, 2 TD
- BIR – Jaydon Mickens – 9 receptions, 107 yards

==== Week 6: at Orlando Storm ====
Week 6: Birmingham Stallions at Orlando Storm – Game summary

Quarter	1	2	3	4	Total
Stallions	14	3	0	3	20
Storm	7	7	0	3	17

at Inter&Co Stadium • Orlando, Florida

- Date: May 3
- Game time: 3:00 p.m. CDT
- Game weather: Partly cloudy, 78 °F (26 °C)
- Game attendance: 9,107
- Referee: Michael Vandervelde
- TV announcers (Fox): Kevin Kugler, Joel Klatt and Jake Butt
- Game Book

Game information

First quarter

- BIR – Snoop Conner 11-yard run (Anders Carlson kick), 10:27. Stallions 7–0. Drive: 3 plays • 74 yards • 1:23
- BIR – Justyn Ross 13-yard pass from Dorian Thompson-Robinson (Anders Carlson kick), 4:13. Stallions 14–0. Drive: 5 plays • 36 yards • 2:19
- ORL – Chris Rowland 3-yard pass from Jack Plummer (Michael Lantz kick), 1:51. Stallions 14–7. Drive: 5 plays • 51 yards • 2:29

Second quarter

- ORL – K. J. Hamler 5-yard pass from Jack Plummer (Michael Lantz kick), 9:10. Tied 14–14. Drive: 9 plays • 63 yards • 5:15
- BIR – Anders Carlson 38-yard field goal, 3:04. Stallions 17–14. Drive: 11 plays • 59 yards • 6:06

Third quarter

- No scoring plays

Fourth quarter

- BIR – Anders Carlson 48-yard field goal, 13:39. Stallions 20–14. Drive: 7 plays • 17 yards • 3:41
- ORL – Michael Lantz 26-yard field goal, 7:33. Stallions 20–17. Drive: 8 plays • 49 yards • 4:05

Top passers

- BIR – Dorian Thompson-Robinson – 19/27, 271 yards, TD
- ORL – Jack Plummer – 26/37, 324 yards, 2 TD

Top rushers

- BIR – Snoop Conner – 16 rushes, 61 yards, TD
- ORL – Jashaun Corbin – 13 rushes, 53 yards

Top receivers

- BIR – Justyn Ross – 7 receptions, 135 yards, TD
- ORL – K. J. Hamler – 8 receptions, 113 yards, TD

==== Week 7: vs. Dallas Renegades ====
Week 7: Dallas Renegades at Birmingham Stallions – Game summary

Quarter	1	2	3	4	OT	Total
Renegades	7	3	0	7	0	17
Stallions	0	7	0	10	4	21

at Protective Stadium • Birmingham, Alabama

- Date: May 9
- Game time: 7:00 p.m. CDT
- Game weather: Partly cloudy, 73 °F (23 °C)
- Game attendance: 4,705
- Referee: Adam Savoie
- TV announcers (ESPN): Joe Tessitore, Jordan Rodgers, Sam Acho and Tom Luginbill
- Game Book

Game information

First quarter

- DAL – Ellis Merriweather 1-yard run (Colton Theaker kick), 3:45. Renegades 7–0. Drive: 15 plays • 55 yards • 8:37

Second quarter

- DAL – Colton Theaker 35-yard field goal, 8:36. Renegades 10–0. Drive: 15 plays • 75 yards • 8:19
- BIR – Daewood Davis 46-yard pass from Dorian Thompson-Robinson (Anders Carlson kick), 3:57. Renegades 10–7. Drive: 8 plays • 71 yards • 4:39

Third quarter

- No scoring plays

Fourth quarter

- BIR – Anders Carlson 40-yard field goal, 8:59. Tied 10–10. Drive: 8 plays • 38 yards • 3:42
- DAL – Ellis Merriweather 15-yard run (Colton Theaker kick), 5:08. Renegades 17–10. Drive: 7 plays • 46 yards • 3:51
- BIR – Jaydon Mickens 18-yard pass from Dorian Thompson-Robinson (Anders Carlson kick), 2:00. Tied 17–17. Drive: 7 plays • 52 yards • 3:08

Overtime

- BIR – Dorian Thompson-Robinson two-point run. Stallions 19–17.
- BIR – Dorian Thompson-Robinson–Jaydon Mickens two-point pass. Stallions 21–17.

Top passers

- DAL – Austin Reed – 25/37, 166 yards
- BIR – Dorian Thompson-Robinson – 12/26, 159 yards, 2 TD, INT

Top rushers

- DAL – Dae Dae Hunter – 11 rushes, 43 yards
- BIR – Tyrion Davis-Price – 12 rushes, 45 yards

Top receivers

- DAL – Ellis Merriweather – 5 receptions, 33 yards
- BIR – Jaydon Mickens – 6 receptions, 82 yards, TD

==== Week 8: vs. Columbus Aviators ====
Week 8: Columbus Aviators at Birmingham Stallions – Game summary

Quarter	1	2	3	4	Total
Aviators	0	3	0	0	3
Stallions	0	0	7	7	14

at Protective Stadium • Birmingham, Alabama

- Date: May 17
- Game time: 1:00 p.m. EDT
- Game weather: Partly cloudy, 84 °F (29 °C)
- Game attendance: 4,824
- Referee: James Carter
- TV announcers (Fox): Kevin Kugler, Joel Klatt, and Jenny Taft
- Game Book

Game information

First quarter

- No scoring plays

Second quarter

- CLB – Jonah Dalmas 48-yard field goal, 8:56. Aviators 3–0. Drive: 9 plays • 20 yards • 5:55

Third quarter

- BIR – Jordan Thomas 29-yard pass from Dorian Thompson-Robinson (Anders Carlson kick), 6:35. Stallions 7–3. Drive: 1 play • 29 yards • 0:09

Fourth quarter

- BIR – Steven Gilmore Jr. 55-yard blocked field goal return (Anders Carlson kick), 8:18. Stallions 14–3.

Top passers

- CLB – Jalan McClendon – 20/31, 150 yards, 2 INT
- BIR – Dorian Thompson-Robinson – 12/20, 126 yards, TD, INT

Top rushers

- CLB – Jalan McClendon – 4 rushes, 18 yards
- BIR – Tyrion Davis-Price – 8 rushes, 21 yards

Top receivers

- CLB – Antwane Wells Jr. – 4 receptions, 22 yards
- BIR – Jordan Thomas – 3 receptions, 28 yards, TD

==== Week 9: at Columbus Aviators ====
Week 9: Birmingham Stallions at Columbus Aviators – Game summary

Quarter	1	2	3	4	Total
Stallions	13	10	3	3	29
Aviators	1	13	7	15	36

at Historic Crew Stadium • Columbus, Ohio

- Date: May 23
- Game time: 3:00 p.m. EDT
- Game weather: Cloudy, 76 °F (24 °C)
- Game attendance: 9,127
- Referee: Bryan Banks
- TV announcers (ABC): Joe Tessitore, Jordan Rodgers, Aaron Murray, and Sam Acho
- Game Book

Game information

First quarter

- BIR – Alex Cook 73-yard fumble return (kick blocked), 11:30. Stallions 6–0.
- CLB – Blocked kick returned by Nehemiah Shelton, 11:30. Stallions 6–1.
- BIR – Deon Cain 17-yard pass from Dorian Thompson-Robinson (Anders Carlson kick), 2:45. Stallions 13–1. Drive: 10 plays • 59 yards • 6:11

Second quarter

- CLB – John Lovett 17-yard pass from Jalen Morton (Jonah Dalmas kick), 14:54. Stallions 13–8. Drive: 6 plays • 64 yards • 2:51
- BIR – Tyrion Davis-Price 18-yard run (Anders Carlson kick), 10:37. Stallions 20–8. Drive: 7 plays • 10 yards • 4:17
- CLB – Gunnar Oakes 20-yard pass from Jalen Morton (two-point pass failed), 6:23. Stallions 20–14. Drive: 8 plays • 70 yards • 4:14
- BIR – Anders Carlson 19-yard field goal, 0:15. Stallions 23–14. Drive: 12 plays • 75 yards • 1:36

Third quarter

- CLB – John Lovett 34-yard pass from Jalen Morton (Jonah Dalmas kick), 5:16. Stallions 23–21. Drive: 5 plays • 59 yards • 2:55
- BIR – Anders Carlson 43-yard field goal, 1:23. Stallions 26–21. Drive: 7 plays • 39 yards • 3:53

Fourth quarter

- BIR – Anders Carlson 46-yard field goal, 11:15. Stallions 29–21. Drive: 4 plays • 2 yards • 1:55
- CLB – Jalen Morton 10-yard run (Jalen Morton–Keke Chism two-point pass), 1:37. Tied 29–29. Drive: 6 plays • 49 yards • 1:54
- CLB – D.J. Miller Jr. 39-yard interception return (Jonah Dalmas kick), 1:15. Aviators 36–29.

Top passers

- BIR – Dorian Thompson-Robinson – 16/35, 157 yards, TD, 2 INT
- CLB – Jalen Morton – 14/30, 213 yards, 3 TD, INT

Top rushers

- BIR – Snoop Conner – 10 rushes, 58 yards
- CLB – Jalen Morton – 13 rushes, 96 yards, TD

Top receivers

- BIR – Daewood Davis – 5 receptions, 50 yards
- CLB – Keke Chism – 3 receptions, 51 yards

==== Week 10: vs. Houston Gamblers ====
Week 10: Houston Gamblers at Birmingham Stallions – Game summary

Quarter	1	2	3	4	Total
Gamblers	3	14	6	3	26
Stallions	0	0	7	6	13

at Protective Stadium • Birmingham, Alabama

- Date: May 30
- Game time: 2:00 p.m. CDT
- Game weather: Thunderstorm, 79 °F (26 °C)
- Game attendance: 5,253
- Referee: Chris Coyte
- TV announcers (ESPN2): Lowell Galindo, Roddy Jones, Cole Cubelic and Harry Douglas
- Game Book

Game information

First quarter

- HOU – John Hoyland 33-yard field goal, 4:05. Gamblers 3–0. Drive: 10 plays • 45 yards • 4:46

Second quarter

- HOU – Marcus Majors Jr. 1-yard run (John Hoyland kick), 12:24. Gamblers 10–0. Drive: 8 plays • 50 yards • 3:36
- HOU – John Rhys Plumlee 11-yard run (John Hoyland kick), 6:45. Gamblers 17–0. Drive: 3 plays • 57 yards • 1:19

Third quarter

- BIR – Alex Cook 70-yard interception return (Anders Carlson kick), 8:43. Gamblers 17–7.
- HOU – Marcus Majors Jr. 72-yard run (kick failed), 8:26. Gamblers 23–7. Drive: 1 plays • 72 yards • 0:17

Fourth quarter

- BIR – Kyric McGowan 6-yard pass from Dorian Thompson-Robinson (two-point pass failed), 2:02. Gamblers 23–13. Drive: 7 plays • 48 yards • 3:25
- HOU – John Hoyland 46-yard field goal, 6:09. Gamblers 26–13. Drive: 8 plays • 50 yards • 5:20

Top passers

- HOU – John Rhys Plumlee – 11/23, 119 yards, INT
- BIR – Dorian Thompson-Robinson – 13/27, 112 yards, TD

Top rushers

- HOU – Marcus Majors Jr. – 8 rushes, 80 yards, 2 TD
- BIR – Snoop Conner – 7 rushes, 25 yards

Top receivers

- HOU – Lawrence Keys III – 2 receptions, 52 yards
- BIR – Jaydon Mickens – 3 receptions, 42 yards

== Standings ==
2026 UFL standings
Team	W	L	PCT	GB	TD+/-	TD+	TD-	PF	PA	DIFF	STK
(y) Orlando Storm	8	2	.800	–	9	26	17	232	186	46	W4
(x) St. Louis Battlehawks	6	4	.600	2	-2	21	23	212	197	15	L1
(x) Louisville Kings	6	4	.600	2	1	27	26	265	219	46	W4
(x) DC Defenders	5	5	.500	3	6	31	25	281	224	57	L4
(e) Dallas Renegades	4	6	.400	4	2	30	28	224	259	-35	W1
(e) Birmingham Stallions	4	6	.400	4	-1	24	25	190	229	-39	L2
(e) Houston Gamblers	4	6	.400	4	-6	20	26	189	236	-60	W1
(e) Columbus Aviators	3	7	.300	5	-6	27	33	216	259	-43	L1
(x)–clinched playoff berth; (y)–clinched conference; (e)–eliminated from playoff contention
