= Rhode Island Breakers =

Professional American football team

- Current season
Logo
Wordmark

General information
- Founded: September 23, 2026; 51 days ago
- Stadium: Centreville Bank Stadium; Pawtucket, Rhode Island
- Colors: Riptide Blue, Beacon Yellow, Nor'Easter Navy, Whitecap
- Website: www.theufl.com/rhode-island

Personnel
- Owner: League owned
- Head coach: A.J. McCarron

Team history
- Rhode Island Breakers (2027–present)

Home fields
- Centreville Bank Stadium (2027–present)

League / conference affiliations
- United Football League (2027)

The Rhode Island Breakers are a professional American football team based in Pawtucket, Rhode Island. The team will compete in the United Football League (UFL). They are planned to begin play in 2027. The team, along with the rest of the league, is owned and operated by a consortium led by Mike Repole, and will play their home games at Centreville Bank Stadium.

== History ==
The Rhode Island Breakers were announced on September 23, 2026 as one of two new teams set to begin play in 2027, along with the Colorado Stampede. The Breakers are the first professional football team to play in Pawtucket since the Rhode Island Steelers folded midseason in 1966.

The team announced and unveiled their name, logo, and colors on October 18th. Its name hearkens to the Breakers of the original United States Football League, a franchise that played its inaugural season in nearby Boston, Massachusetts in 1983. It is the second team in the modern spring football era to carry the Breakers name; the New Orleans Breakers (which never played in that city, though it had been negotiating with venues in the area if it had survived) of the revived USFL were among the teams that had been left out of that league's merger with the XFL to form the UFL. Its logo, which incorporates a lighthouse, breaks from the previous Breakers logos and bears more similarity to the University of Rhode Island Rams, whose football team plays at the same stadium in 2026.

== Current roster ==
Rhode Island Breakers roster
| Quarterbacks (QB): 7 Michael Hiers; 18 Donovan Smith; 2 Dorian Thompson-Robinson; Running backs (RB): 24 Snoop Conner; 9 Tyrion Davis-Price; 5 Anthony McFarland Jr.; Wide receivers (WR): 80 Jabre Barber; 8 Deon Cain; 11 Daewood Davis; 0 Kyric McGowan; 12 Jaydon Mickens; 88 Justyn Ross; 17 Marlon Williams; Tight ends (TE): 84 Tyler Davis; 81 Jordan Thomas | Offensive linemen (OL): 62 Andrew Carter RG; 77 Brian Dooley LT; 59 Adrian Ealy RT; 69 Noah Henderson LT; 53 Noah Johnson C; 68 Zack Johnson LG; 76 Joey Lombard C; 73 Armani Taylor-Prioleau LT; 74 Preston Wilson C; Defensive linemen (DL): 96 T. J. Carter NT; 94 Isaiah Coe DT; 91 Ricky Correia DT; 92 Jayden Peevy DT | Linebackers (LB): 90 Randy Charlton OLB; 20 Tae Crowder ILB; 33 Olakunle Fatukasi OLB; 43 DaRon Gilbert ILB; 50 Izayah Green-May OLB; 52 Kobe Jones OLB; 31 Kyahva Tezino ILB; 99 Isaac Ukwu OLB; Defensive backs (DB): 3 Lance Boykin CB; 23 Lukas Denis FS; 6 Clarence Lewis CB; 19 Shaquan Loyal FS; 21 Tre Norwood FS; 29 Davion Ross CB; 4 Jojo Tillery FS; Special teams (ST): 26 Anders Carlson K; 27 Ryan Langan LS; 15 Colby Wadman P | 46 active As of October 1, 2026. Rookies in italics.: Roster |

== Player history ==
=== Notable players ===
| Season | Pos | Name | Notes |
|---|---|---|---|
| 2027–present | WR | Jaydon Mickens | Former Tampa Bay Buccaneers wide receiver |
| 2027–present | QB | Dorian Thompson-Robinson | Former Cleveland Browns Quarterback, 2023 5th Round Pick |

== Coach history ==
=== Head coaches ===
| # | Coach | Term | Regular season | | | | Playoffs | | | Awards |
| # | Coach | Term | GC | W | L | Win % | GC | W | L | Awards |
Rhode Island Breakers
| 1 | A.J. McCarron | 2027–present | - | - | - | - | - | - | - | |
