= List of professional sports teams in Rhode Island =

As of March 2024, Rhode Island has two professional sports teams, the Providence Bruins, minor league affiliate of the Boston Bruins, as well as Rhode Island FC, who compete in the USL Championship, the second tier of American soccer.

== Notable sports teams ==
Club	Sport	League
Providence Bruins	Ice Hockey	American Hockey League
Rhode Island FC	Soccer	USL Championship
Rhode Island Breakers	American football	United Football League
