= A. J. McCarron =

American football player (born 1990)

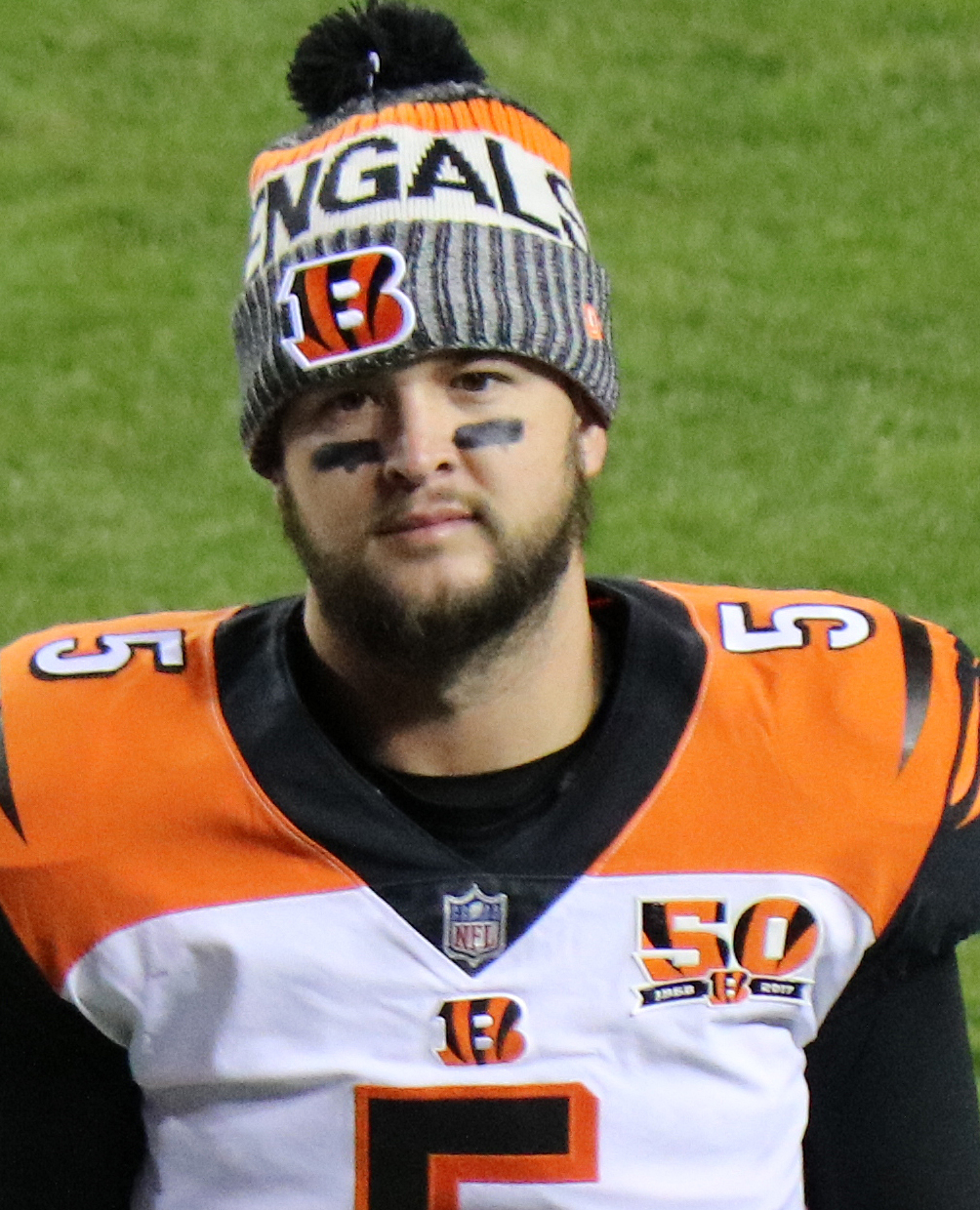
- McCarron with the Cincinnati Bengals in 2017

Rhode Island Breakers
- Title: Head coach

Personal information
- Born: September 13, 1990 (age 36); Mobile, Alabama, U.S.
- Listed height: 6 ft 3 in (1.91 m)
- Listed weight: 220 lb (100 kg)

Career information
- Position: Quarterback (No. 5, 2, 4, 10)
- High school: St. Paul's Episcopal (Mobile)
- College: Alabama (2009–2013)
- NFL draft: 2014: 5th round, 164th overall pick

Career history

Playing
- Cincinnati Bengals (2014–2017); Buffalo Bills (2018)*; Oakland Raiders (2018); Houston Texans (2019–2020); Atlanta Falcons (2021); St. Louis Battlehawks (2023); Cincinnati Bengals (2023); St. Louis Battlehawks (2024)
- * Offseason or practice squad member only

Coaching
- Birmingham Stallions (2026) Head coach; Rhode Island Breakers (2027–present) Head coach

Awards and highlights
- XFL Most Valuable Player (2023); XFL passing touchdowns leader (2023); XFL passer rating leader (2023); XFL completion percentage leader (2023); 3× BCS national champion (2009, 2011, 2012); Maxwell Award (2013); Johnny Unitas Golden Arm Award (2013); Kellen Moore Award (2013); First-team All-American (2013); Third-team All-American (2012); NCAA passer rating leader (2012); 2× Second-team All-SEC (2012, 2013)

Career NFL statistics
- Passing attempts: 179
- Passing completions: 113
- Completion percentage: 63.1%
- TD–INT: 6–3
- Passing yards: 1,192
- Passer rating: 86.6
- Stats at Pro Football Reference

Head coaching record
- Regular season: 4–6 (.400)
- Career: 4–6 (.400)

Raymond Anthony "A. J." McCarron Jr. (born September 13, 1990) is an American former professional football quarterback and current head coach of the Rhode Island Breakers of the United Football League (UFL). He played college football for the Alabama Crimson Tide, becoming the first quarterback to win consecutive BCS National Championship Games with victories in 2012 and 2013. McCarron also received the Maxwell, Johnny Unitas Golden Arm, and Kellen Moore Awards.

McCarron was selected by the Cincinnati Bengals in the fifth round of the 2014 NFL draft and played four seasons as a backup. He spent his next four seasons as a backup with the Oakland Raiders, Houston Texans, and Atlanta Falcons, then spent two seasons as the starting quarterback for the St. Louis Battlehawks, a team that played initially in the XFL and then the United Football League (UFL).

In October 2025, McCarron announced his candidacy for Lieutenant Governor of Alabama in the 2026 election. He dropped out in December of the same year.

== Early life ==
McCarron was born to Dee Dee Bonner and Tony McCarron on September 13, 1990. His younger brother, Corey, played tight end at Alabama but transferred to play fullback at Middle Tennessee State.

McCarron was born and raised in Mobile, Alabama. He attended Our Lady of Lourdes Catholic School from kindergarten to fourth grade before transferring to St. Paul's Episcopal School. At the age of five, McCarron was severely injured in a jet-ski accident and almost died. He first played football at Trimmier Park and then Langan Park in Mobile. McCarron played on the same park team as future college teammate Mark Barron. During McCarron's junior season of high school, St. Paul's went 14–1 and went on to win the state championship against Briarwood Christian School off a missed PAT. While attending St. Paul's, McCarron was recruited by several football programs in the Southeastern Conference, including Alabama, Auburn, Mississippi, and Tennessee. On May 3, 2008, he committed to the Crimson Tide, becoming the only quarterback signed by Alabama for their 2009 recruiting class.

McCarron capped off his high school football career at the 2009 U.S. Army All-American Bowl.

== College career ==
=== 2010 season ===
In his first season at Alabama, McCarron accepted a redshirt and did not play during the season as the team went 14–0 to capture the 2009 National Championship over the Texas Longhorns. During his redshirt freshman year, McCarron did see some playing time, appearing in nine games as the Crimson Tide finished 10–3. His first collegiate touchdown pass came during the season opener when he connected with wide receiver Julio Jones on a 29-yard pass against San Jose State. McCarron passed for 389 yards and three touchdowns during the season. Against Auburn on Alabama's last possession McCarron came in for injured starter Greg McElroy. However, McCarron threw four straight incompletions to end the game as Auburn came back to win 28–27 after being down 24–0 in the second quarter.

=== 2011 season ===
After a tight competition for the starting quarterback position during spring practices, McCarron was named as the co-starting quarterback alongside Phillip Sims for the team's 2011 season opener versus Kent State, and later became the de facto starter by starting in every game. In his first collegiate start, McCarron threw for 226 yards, a touchdown, and two interceptions as Alabama won 48–7. His first road start for Alabama came the following week, as the Tide traveled to State College, Pennsylvania. McCarron's performance of 163 yards with no turnovers helped Alabama defeat Penn State by a score of 27–11, which turned out to be the last loss for head coach Joe Paterno. Another solid performance, alongside running back Trent Richardson, helped McCarron get a victory in his first Southeastern Conference (SEC) start, a 38–14 win over #14 Arkansas.

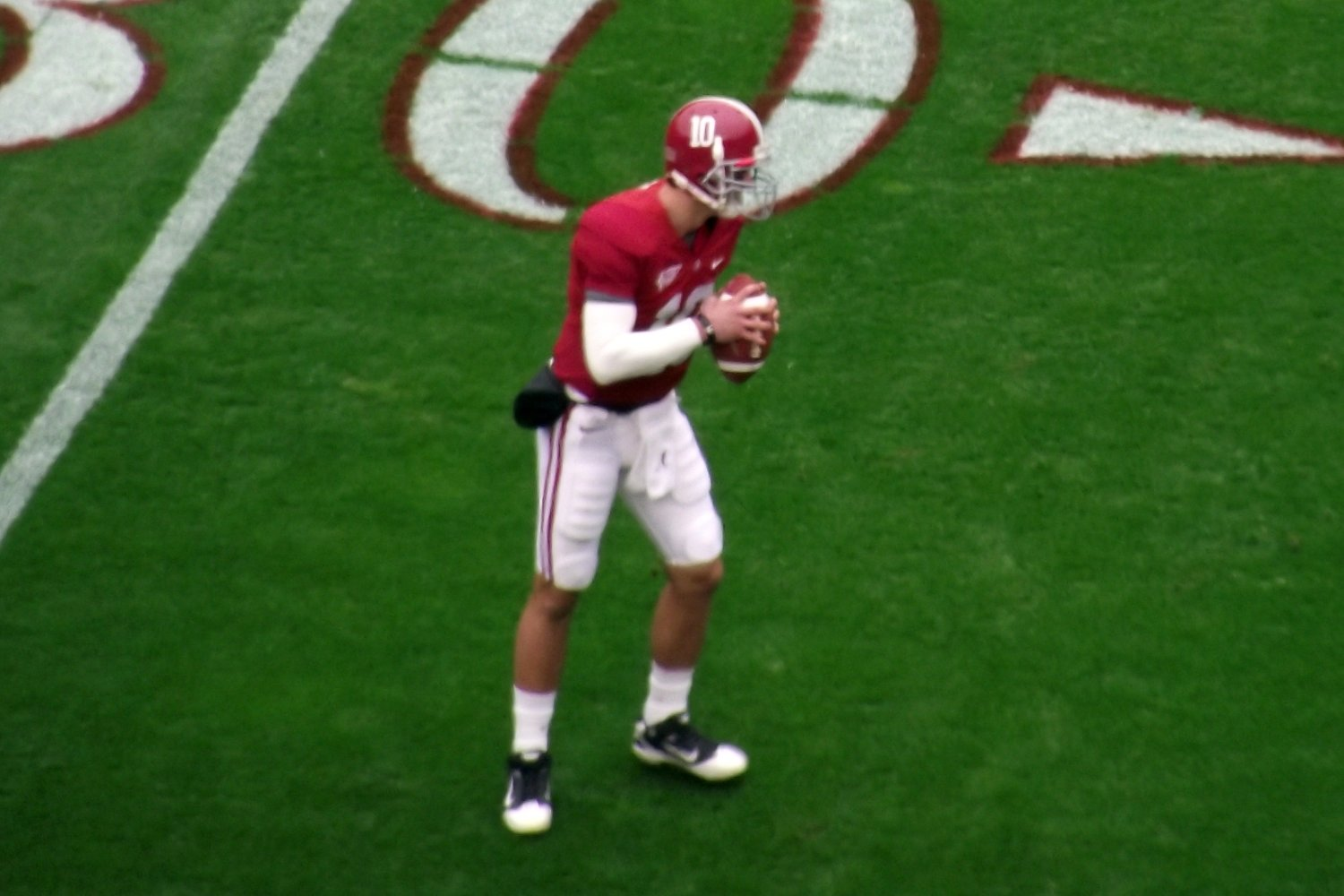
McCarron in 2010

During the course of his sophomore season, McCarron helped lead the Crimson Tide to an 11–1 overall record during the regular season, including 7–1 record in conference. Alabama's only loss of the season came during a 9–6 overtime defeat at the hands of #1-ranked LSU. During the game, McCarron completed 16-of-28 passes for 199 yards and an interception. By remaining unbeaten during the rest of the regular season, Alabama again met LSU at the Superdome for the national championship. His performance of 234 yards passing earned McCarron Offensive Player of the Game in a 21–0 rout of the Tigers. During his first season as starting quarterback, McCarron threw for 2,634 yards, 16 touchdowns, and five interceptions and led the team to the BCS National Championship.

=== 2012 season ===
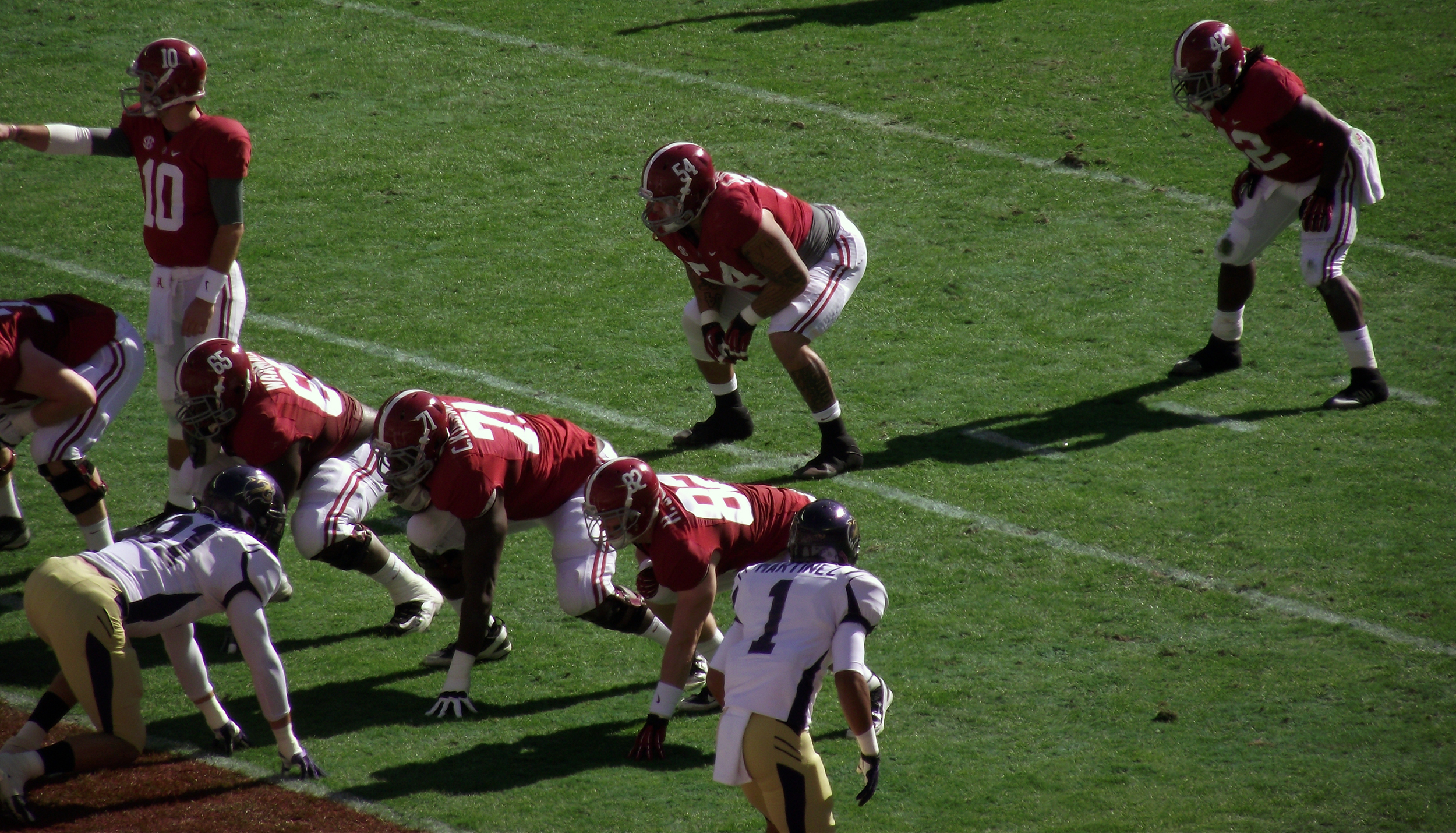
McCarron at quarterback during a game versus Western Carolina

McCarron had a strong start in his second year as starting quarterback for Alabama as the Crimson Tide started off the season with a 9–0 record. His good start to the season, including a comeback victory over LSU, had several media members put McCarron as a dark horse candidate for the year's Heisman Trophy. His first interception, and Alabama's first loss, of the season came in the team's tenth game of the season.

In their first year in the SEC, Texas A&M and eventual Heisman-winner Johnny Manziel came into Bryant–Denny Stadium and upset Alabama 29–24. McCarron's second interception of the game seemingly sealed Alabama's loss, as he threw an interception on a fourth & goal pass with under two minutes remaining. Both McCarron and Alabama rebounded to remain unbeaten during the rest of the regular season, which led them to the 2012 SEC Championship Game versus Georgia. With the help of running back Eddie Lacy, Alabama battled the Bulldogs to win 32–28 and earn a shot to play for the 2013 BCS National Championship against No. 1 Notre Dame.

On December 12, 2012, ahead of their game against Notre Dame, McCarron announced that he would be coming back to Alabama for his senior season. On January 7, 2013, Alabama met Notre Dame for the 2013 BCS National Championship. The Fighting Irish were led by their defense and Heisman runner-up Manti Te'o to an unbeaten 12–0 regular season record. However, their defense was overmatched as Alabama rolled 42–14 to capture their third BCS National Championship in four years behind McCarron's 264 yards and four touchdown passes, which allowed him to become the first quarterback to win back-to-back BCS titles. During his junior season, McCarron threw for a school-record 30 touchdown passes in a season, as well as 49 touchdown passes over his career. He also had an NCAA-leading passer rating of 175.3. McCarron was named winner of the 2012 CFPA Quarterback Trophy on January 22, 2013.

=== 2013 season ===
McCarron made the cover of Sports Illustrated's October 30, 2013, edition, which asked whether he was one of the best college players ever. At that time, McCarron (whose team was 10–0) was a long shot for the Heisman Trophy.

As a senior in 2013, McCarron was again a second-team All-SEC selection. During the season, he passed John Parker Wilson to become Alabama's all time passing yard leader. Alabama started the season with an 11–0 record before facing Auburn in the Iron Bowl. In the 34–28 loss, McCarron threw for 277 yards and three touchdowns, one of which was a 99-yard pass to Amari Cooper. The loss knocked Alabama out of contention for the SEC Championship. The Crimson Tide finished their season in the Sugar Bowl against Oklahoma. In the 45–31 loss to the Sooners, McCarron had 387 passing yards, two touchdowns, and two interceptions in his final collegiate game. He also broke Greg McElroy's record for passing yards in a season, with 3,063. McCarron finished in second place in the Heisman Trophy voting that season.

== Professional career ==
=== Pre-draft ===
Coming out of Alabama, McCarron was projected by the majority of NFL draft experts and scouts to be drafted in the second or third round. He was praised for his game management and decision making, with the potential to become an NFL starter.

Pre-draft measurables
Height	Weight	Arm length	Hand span	Wingspan	40-yard dash	10-yard split	20-yard split	20-yard shuttle	Three-cone drill	Vertical jump	Broad jump	Wonderlic
6 ft 3 1/4 in (1.91 m)	220 lb (100 kg)	31 1/2 in (0.80 m)	10 in (0.25 m)	6 ft 2 in (1.88 m)	4.94 s	1.77 s	2.93 s	4.34 s	7.18 s	28.0 in (0.71 m)	8 ft 3 in (2.51 m)	22
All values from NFL Combine

=== Cincinnati Bengals (first stint) ===
==== 2014 season ====
McCarron was selected by the Cincinnati Bengals in the fifth round (164th overall) of the 2014 NFL draft. Along with University of Georgia quarterback Aaron Murray, McCarron's draft value drastically dropped during the draft, as he was the ninth quarterback selected, out of the total 14. It was reported that teams felt during pre-draft interviews that he came across cocky and over-confident. When asked what his best attribute was during an interview at the combine, McCarron responded, "Winning!"

On May 22, 2014, the Bengals signed McCarron to a four-year, $2.4 million contract with a $181,652 signing bonus. On August 30, he was placed on the reserve/non-football injury list due to shoulder soreness, meaning that McCarron would miss at least the first six weeks of the 2014 season. With Andy Dalton entrenched as the starting quarterback for the Bengals, and veteran Jason Campbell as his backup, the Bengals did not plan for McCarron to see significant playing time during his rookie season. On December 9, McCarron was activated after linebacker Vontaze Burfict was placed on injured reserve.

==== 2015 season ====
McCarron was named the backup quarterback to begin the season after beating out Keith Wenning and Terrelle Pryor during training camp.

During a Week 9 31–10 victory over the Cleveland Browns, McCarron made his NFL debut. Three weeks later, he completed his first career pass attempt for a three-yard completion in a 31–7 victory over the St. Louis Rams. In the next game, McCarron completed two of three passes for 19 yards during a 37–3 blowout road victory over the Browns.

During Week 14 against the Pittsburgh Steelers, starting quarterback Dalton fractured the thumb on his throwing hand while trying to make a tackle in the first quarter. McCarron came in and finished the 33–20 loss with 280 passing yards, two touchdowns, and two interceptions. The following week, McCarron became the first Alabama quarterback to win an NFL game since Jeff Rutledge of the New York Giants in 1987. In his first career start against the San Francisco 49ers, McCarron completed 15-of-21 passes for 192 yards and a touchdown during the 24–14 road victory. The following week against the Denver Broncos on Monday Night Football, he threw for 200 yards and a touchdown in the 20–17 overtime road loss. During the regular season finale against the Baltimore Ravens, McCarron recorded 160 passing yards and two touchdowns in the 24–16 victory.

McCarron finished the 2015 season with 854 passing yards, six touchdowns, and two interceptions in seven games and three starts. The Bengals finished atop the AFC North with a 12–4 record and qualified for the playoffs as the #3-seed. During the Wild Card Round against the Steelers, McCarron completed 23-of-41 passes for 212 yards, a touchdown, and an interception in the narrow 18–16 loss.

==== 2016 season ====
In 2016, McCarron only played in one game and recorded no statistics in a Week 6 35–17 loss to the New England Patriots.

==== 2017 season ====
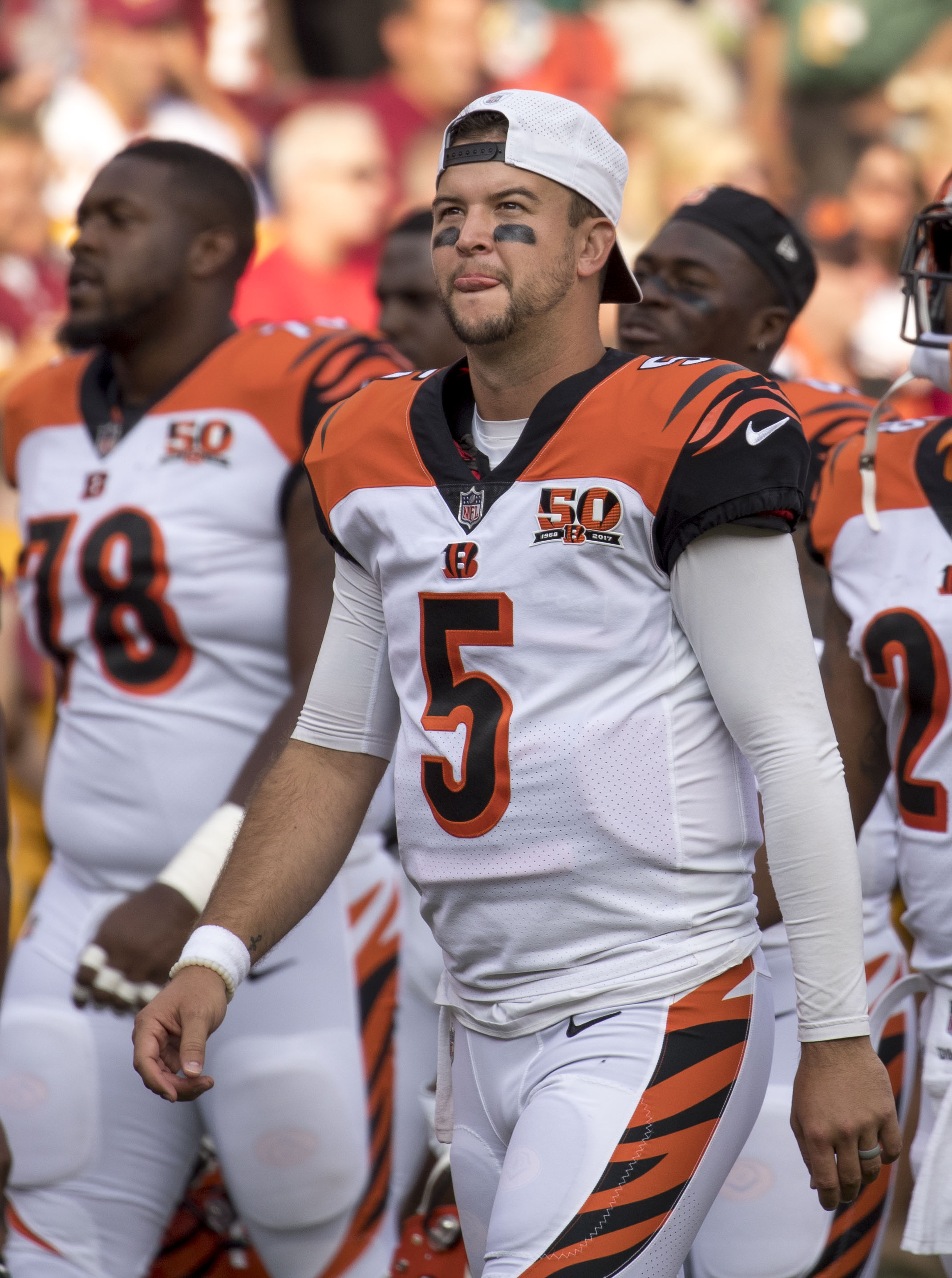
McCarron in 2017

On October 31, 2017, the Bengals and Browns agreed on a deal to trade McCarron to Cleveland in exchange for a second and third-round pick in the 2018 NFL draft. However, the Browns failed to file the paperwork to the NFL before the trade deadline, nixing the trade. Four days later, it was reported that McCarron had filed a labor grievance against the Bengals asking to become an unrestricted free agent following the 2017 season as opposed to a restricted free agent. McCarron claimed that he was healthy enough to be removed from the non-football injury list during training camp in 2014 and that his rookie season should count as an accrued season towards unrestricted free agency.

On February 15, 2018, McCarron won the grievance and became a free agent to begin the 2018 season while also receiving lost salary with interest from the 2014 season. He finished the 2017 season completing seven of 14 passes for 66 yards in three games and no starts.

=== Buffalo Bills ===
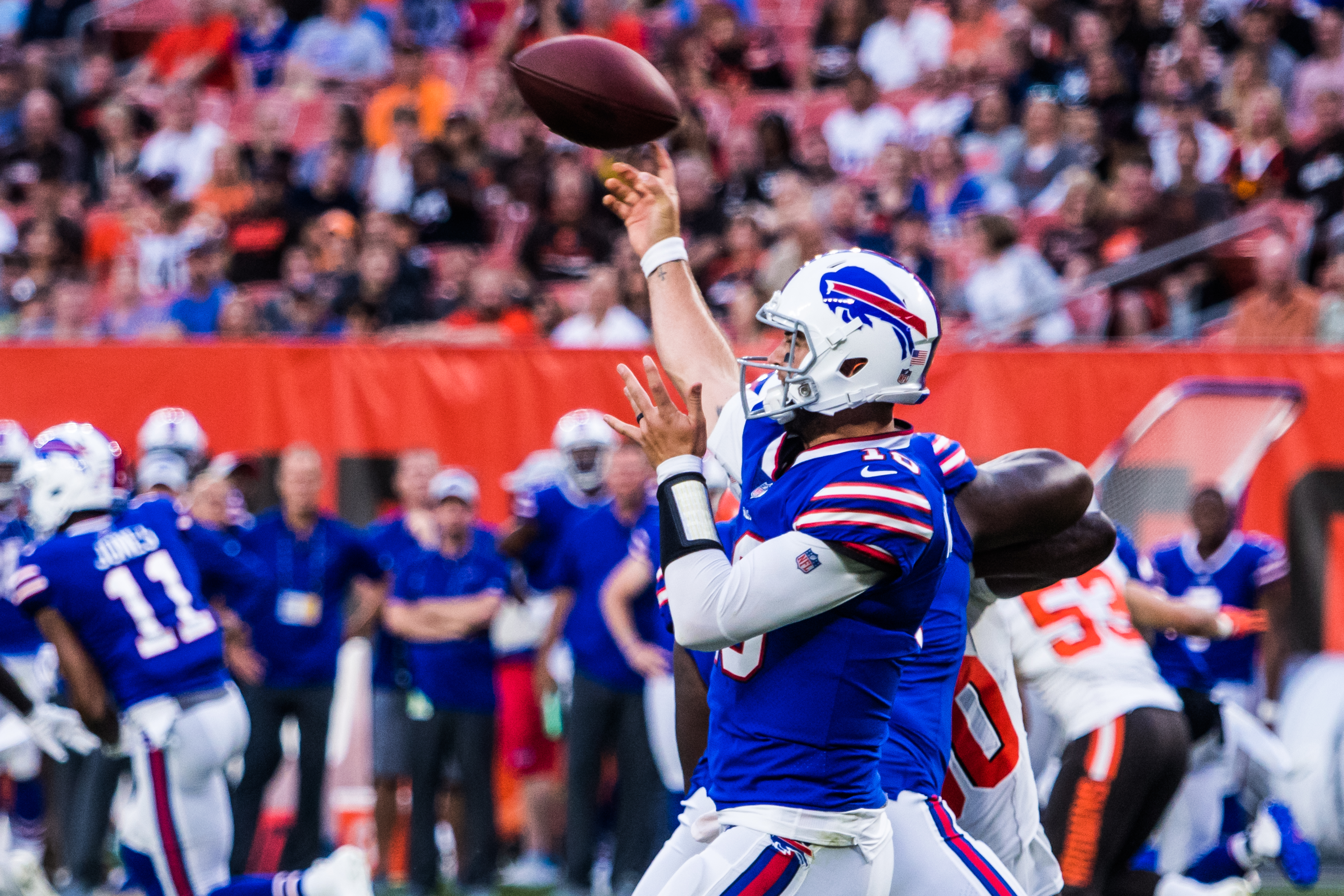
McCarron in 2018

On March 14, 2018, McCarron signed a two-year, $10 million contract with the Buffalo Bills. He competed for the starting quarterback position with second-year quarterback Nathan Peterman and rookie Josh Allen. However, McCarron suffered a shoulder injury during a preseason game against the Browns. The injury was initially reported as a hairline fracture in his collarbone, which would have sidelined him for about four to six weeks. Nonetheless, McCarron received a second opinion on the injury, which revealed no fracture, clearing him to participate in the next two preseason games, including a comeback victory over the Chicago Bears, where McCarron passed for three touchdowns and ran for another in the fourth quarter despite carrying a 0.0 passer rating the previous three quarters.

=== Oakland Raiders ===
On September 1, 2018, McCarron was traded to the Oakland Raiders for a 2019 fifth-round draft pick (originally acquired from the Steelers). He appeared in two games in relief of Derek Carr during the 2018 season, completing one of three passes for eight yards.

McCarron was released on March 14, 2019.

=== Houston Texans ===
On March 20, 2019, McCarron signed a one-year contract with the Houston Texans. In the regular-season finale against the Tennessee Titans, McCarron recorded his first start since the 2015 season since the Texans were already locked into the #4-seed in the AFC and sat most of their starters as a result. McCarron finished the 35–14 loss with 225 passing yards and an interception to go along with 39 rushing yards and a touchdown.

On March 30, 2020, McCarron re-signed with the Texans. He briefly entered the Week 14 matchup against the Bears after starter Deshaun Watson hurt his elbow, but McCarron was sacked on his lone play for a turnover on downs. The Texans went on to lose on the road by a score of 36–7. In the regular-season finale against the Titans, McCarron came into the game during the second quarter and threw a single pass for 20 yards in the 41–38 loss.

=== Atlanta Falcons ===
On April 30, 2021, McCarron signed a one-year contract with the Atlanta Falcons. However, he suffered a torn ACL in the Week 2 preseason game against the Miami Dolphins and was placed on season-ending injured reserve, ending his season before it even started.

=== St. Louis BattleHawks (first stint) ===
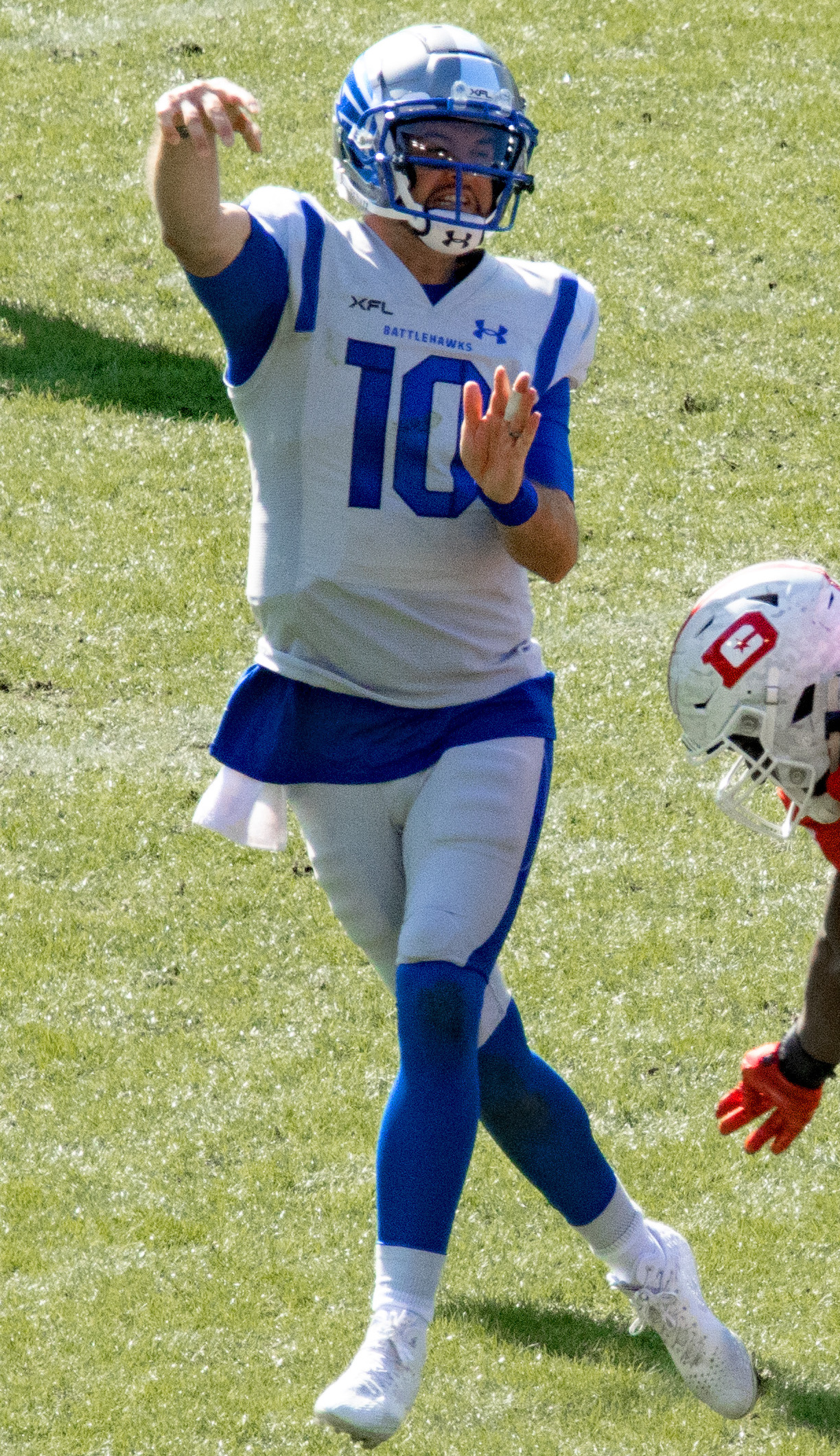
McCarron in 2023

On November 15, 2022, McCarron was selected by the St. Louis BattleHawks of the XFL. He later signed a contract with the team, worth between $100,000 to $200,000 a season. McCarron quickly became a breakout star for the Battlehawks after two consecutive comeback victories in the first two weeks of the 2023 season. In a postgame interview, McCarron stated that he chose to play in the XFL rather than take a more lucrative position as an NFL backup in order to give himself more on-camera playing time so his children could watch him play, which prompted XFL co-owner Dwayne Johnson to praise McCarron for his choice.

In his final game of the 2023 regular season, McCarron completed 28-of-35 passes for 420 yards and six touchdowns — the yardage and touchdowns the most in a single game by an XFL passer in league history. He also set a league record for single-season touchdown passes with 24 that year.

Following the season, McCarron indicated that he was open to opportunities to return to the NFL, saying, "I'm not done playing." McCarron was released on September 23, 2023.

=== Cincinnati Bengals (second stint) ===
On September 23, 2023, the Bengals signed McCarron to their practice squad. On December 4, he was signed to the active roster.

McCarron saw his first in-season action with the Bengals in Week 14 against the Indianapolis Colts, relieving starting quarterback Jake Browning during the third quarter after Browning exited the game for a thumb injury. McCarron completed one pass before Browning returned to the eventual 34–14 victory the following drive.

McCarron requested and was granted his release on February 14, 2024.

=== St. Louis Battlehawks (second stint) ===
McCarron expressed hesitancy about returning to the Battlehawks after his stint with the Bengals ended, noting that the merged United Football League was unionized when the XFL players had voted against joining the union and that the new league's pay structure was less generous to quarterbacks than the XFL's was. Battlehawks coach Anthony Becht reserved a roster spot for McCarron if he agreed to return to the team. McCarron ultimately agreed to return to the league because he had grown to like the league and appreciated his role in it as a senior veteran.

McCarron re-signed with the St. Louis Battlehawks on February 16, 2024. He spent the 2024 season as the Battlehawks' starting quarterback. McCarron suffered an ankle injury during a Week 7 contest against the Birmingham Stallions, but played through the injury for the rest of the game, stating at the time that he hoped to teach a lesson to his children; McCarron eventually returned for the end of the season and the XFL conference championship, where he re-injured his ankle in a 25–15 loss to the San Antonio Brahmas. McCarron planned on having surgery to repair the ankle in the offseason, noting that there was a possibility it could end his playing career but that he wanted to continue having a part in the league even if it would be in a non-playing role.

On November 15, 2024, Becht relinquished McCarron's rights, stating that he felt that it was time for another quarterback, preferably someone on an NFL practice squad (eventually revealed as Max Duggan) to take the Battlehawks' reins in 2025. In a post-release interview, McCarron indicated that he suspected he would not be on the Battlehawks roster for 2025 before the 2024 season ended and accused Becht of multiple wrongs, including forcing him to return to play at the end of the 2024 season while still injured, reneging on an agreement to issue a joint statement announcing his departure (as he found out about his release from his son), attempting to enforce a nonexistent reserve clause to forbid McCarron from signing with any other team unless the Battlehawks agreed to trade his rights, and portraying the departure as a retirement when McCarron fully intends on returning to professional football. McCarron asserted that his contract had already expired before Becht released him and was already a free agent. He expressed a desire to remain in the UFL, with a preference of staying in the XFL conference so he could beat Becht's team twice in a season, while also remaining open to signing with his home state team, the Stallions. A. J. Smith revealed in a June 2025 interview that McCarron had been in deep discussions with the Brahmas (where Smith was offensive coordinator at the time) to sign with that team, only for unnamed upper management personnel to veto the signing. In a January 2025 interview with the New York Post, McCarron's wife indicated that he would likely not play football again and was in the process of securing a podcast deal.

== Coaching career ==
=== Birmingham Stallions ===
On December 18, 2025, McCarron was hired as the head coach of the Birmingham Stallions of the United Football League (UFL).

=== Rhode Island Breakers ===
On September 30, 2026, McCarron was announced as the head coach of the expansion Rhode Island Breakers.

== Career statistics ==
=== Playing career ===
==== NFL ====
Regular season

Year	Team	Games			Passing									Rushing					Fumbles	
Year	Team	GP	GS	Record	Cmp	Att	Pct	Yds	Y/A	Lng	TD	Int	Rtg	Att	Yds	Avg	Lng	TD	Fum	Lost
2014	CIN	0	0	—	DNP															
2015	CIN	**7**	**3**	**2–1**	**79**	**119**	66.4	**854**	7.2	**66**	**6**	**2**	97.1	**14**	31	2.2	16	0	**1**	**1**
2016	CIN	1	0	—	0	0	0.0	0	0.0	0	0	0	0.0	0	0	0.0	0	0	0	0
2017	CIN	3	0	—	7	14	50.0	66	4.7	27	0	0	63.4	0	0	0.0	0	0	0	0
2018	OAK	2	0	—	1	3	33.3	8	2.7	8	0	0	42.4	3	−2	0.7	0	0	**1**	0
2019	HOU	2	1	0–1	21	37	56.8	225	6.1	21	0	1	63.5	5	**39**	**7.8**	**18**	**1**	0	0
2020	HOU	2	0	—	1	1	**100.0**	20	**20.0**	20	0	0	**118.7**	0	0	0.0	0	0	0	0
2021	ATL	0	0	—	Did not play due to injury															
2023	CIN	2	0	—	4	5	80.0	19	3.8	10	0	0	82.5	0	0	0.0	0	0	0	0
Career		19	4	2–2	113	179	63.1	1,192	6.7	66	6	3	86.6	22	68	3.1	18	1	2	1

Postseason

Year	Team	Games			Passing									Rushing					Fumbles	
Year	Team	GP	GS	Record	Cmp	Att	Pct	Yds	Avg	Lng	TD	Int	Rtg	Att	Yds	Avg	Lng	TD	Fum	Lost
2015	CIN	1	1	0–1	23	41	56.1	212	5.2	25	1	1	68.3	5	9	1.8	6	0	3	1
Career		1	1	0–1	23	41	56.1	212	5.2	25	1	1	68.3	5	9	1.8	6	0	3	1

==== XFL–UFL ====
Regular season

Year	Team	Games			Passing								Rushing			
Year	Team	GP	GS	Record	Cmp	Att	Pct	Yds	Avg	TD	Int	Rtg	Att	Yds	Avg	TD
2023	STL	9	9	6–3	203	295	68.8	2,150	7.3	24	6	108.4	29	100	3.4	1
2024	STL	8	8	6–2	164	255	64.3	1,582	6.2	15	4	98.9	23	87	3.7	1
Career		17	17	12–5	367	550	66.6	3,732	6.8	39	10	103.6	52	187	3.6	2

Postseason

Year	Team	Games			Passing								Rushing			
Year	Team	GP	GS	Record	Cmp	Att	Pct	Yds	Avg	TD	Int	Rtg	Att	Yds	Avg	TD
2024	STL	1	1	0–1	19	29	65.5	179	6.2	1	0	93.9	2	5	2.5	0
Career		1	1	0–1	19	29	65.5	179	6.2	1	0	93.9	2	5	2.5	0

==== College ====
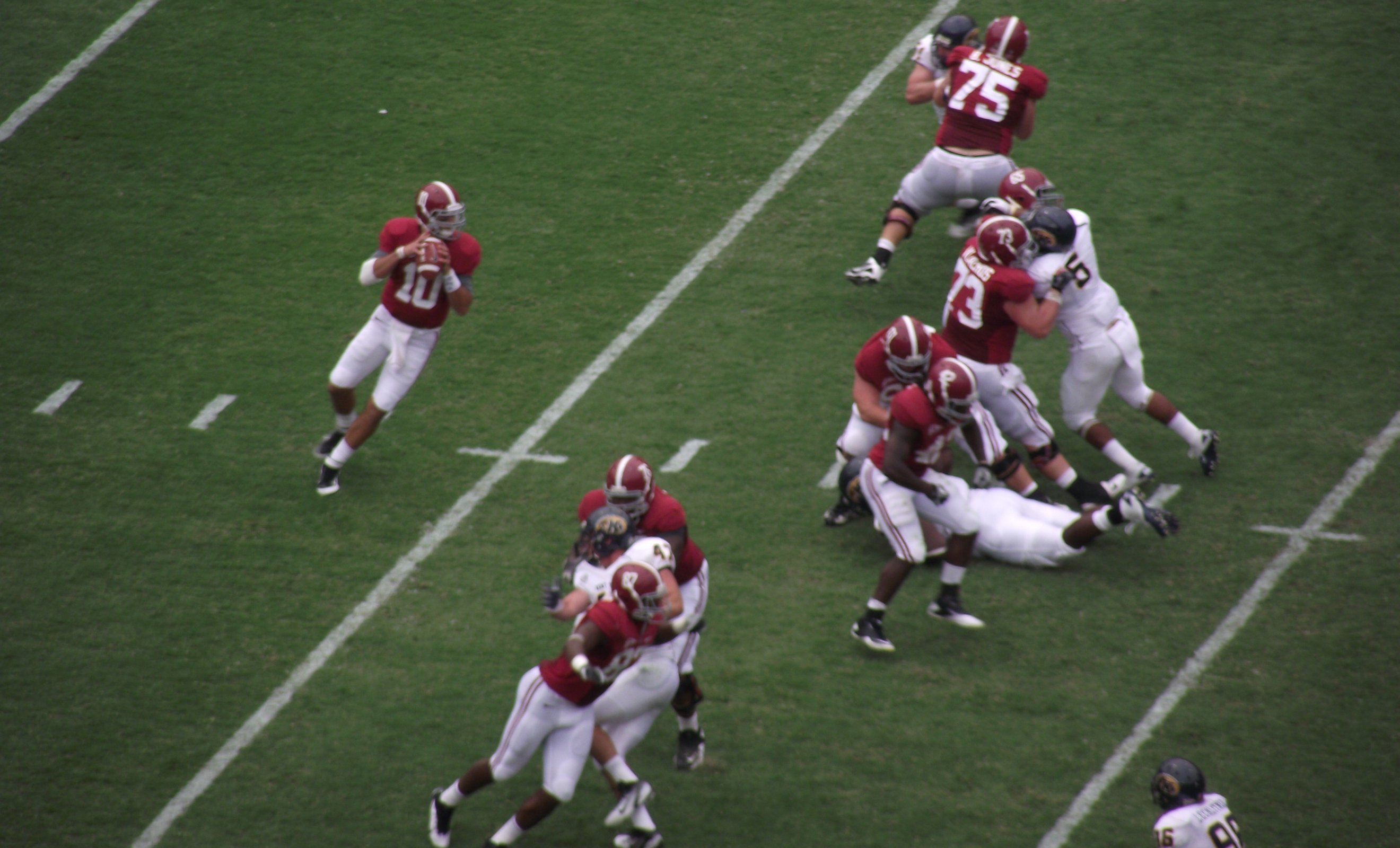
McCarron (#10) drops back to attempt a pass against Kent State

Legend
	Led the NCAA
**Bold**	Career high

Season	Team	Games			Passing								Rushing			
Season	Team	GP	GS	Record	Cmp	Att	Pct	Yds	Avg	TD	Int	Rate	Att	Yds	Avg	TD
2009	Alabama	0	0	—	Redshirt											
2010	Alabama	13	0	—	30	48	62.5	389	8.1	3	0	151.2	6	-10	-1.7	0
2011	Alabama	13	13	12–1	219	328	66.8	2,634	8.0	16	5	147.3	30	-22	-0.7	**2**
2012	Alabama	**14**	**14**	**13–1**	211	314	67.2	2,933	**9.3**	**30**	3	**175.3**	**49**	**4**	**0.1**	1
2013	Alabama	13	13	11–2	**226**	**336**	**67.6**	**3,063**	9.0	28	**7**	167.2	34	-22	-0.6	0
Career		53	40	36–4	686	1,026	66.8	9,019	8.8	77	15	162.5	119	-50	-0.4	3

=== Head coaching record ===
Team	Year	Regular season					Postseason			
Team	Year	Won	Lost	Ties	Win %	Finish	Won	Lost	Win %	Result
BIR	2026	4	6	0	.400	6th	—	—	—	—
Total		4	6	0	.400		0	0	–	

== Politics ==
On October 23, 2025, McCarron announced that he would be running for Lieutenant Governor of Alabama in 2026 as a Republican.

McCarron registered to vote for the first time three days before announcing his candidacy. In a statement to the Alabama Daily News, his campaign stated that he had been, "inspired to run by the previous month's assassination of Charlie Kirk."

McCarron dropped his candidacy on December 17, 2025, saying that "football is calling my name," and that he was accepting a new football opportunity. On December 18th, McCarron was named the head coach position of the Birmingham Stallions, a job that had been opened following the departure of Skip Holtz.

== Personal life ==
McCarron became engaged to model and longtime girlfriend Katherine Webb in March 2014. They got married on July 12, 2014, in Orange Beach, Alabama. Webb announced on December 8, 2015, that she was four months pregnant with their first son, to whom she gave birth in May 2016. In December 2018, Webb gave birth to a second son. In March 2021, she gave birth to the couple's third son.

McCarron is a Catholic.

== See also ==
- List of NCAA major college football yearly passing leaders
