= Jordan Williams (defensive lineman) =

American gridiron football player (born 1999)

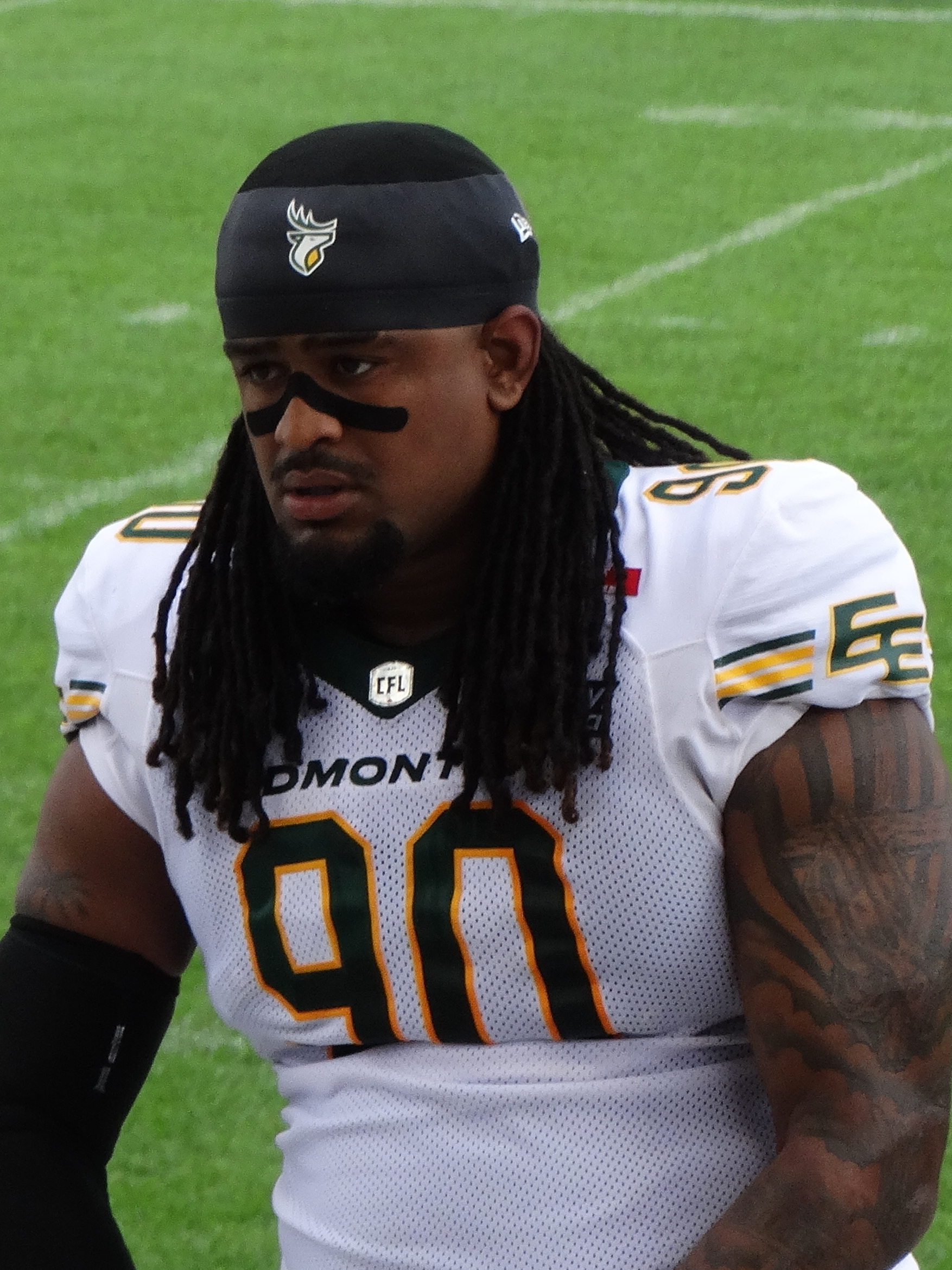
- Williams with the Edmonton Elks in 2025

No. 90 – Edmonton Elks
- Position: Defensive lineman
- Roster status: Active
- CFL status: American

Personal information
- Born: February 12, 1999 (age 27); Virginia Beach, Virginia, U.S.
- Listed height: 6 ft 5 in (1.96 m)
- Listed weight: 285 lb (129 kg)

Career information
- High school: Cox High (Virginia Beach)
- College: Virginia Tech; Clemson

Career history
- 2022: Miami Dolphins*
- 2023: Memphis Showboats
- 2024–2025: Toronto Argonauts
- 2025–present: Edmonton Elks
- * Offseason or practice squad member only

Awards and highlights
- 2× Grey Cup champion (2024, 2026); CFP national champion (2018)
- Stats at CFL.ca

Jordan Williams (born February 12, 1999) is an American professional football defensive lineman for the Edmonton Elks of the Canadian Football League (CFL).

== College career ==
After using a redshirt season in 2017, Williams played college football for the Clemson Tigers from 2018 to 2020. He played in 38 games, starting in three, where he had 55 tackles, four sacks, two pass breakups, and one forced fumble. He then transferred to Virginia Tech in 2021 to play for the Hokies where he played in 12 games, starting in seven, and recorded 33 tackles, 2.5 sacks, and one forced fumble.

== Professional career ==
Pre-draft measurables
Height	Weight	Arm length	Hand span	Wingspan	40-yard dash	10-yard split	20-yard split	20-yard shuttle	Three-cone drill	Vertical jump	Broad jump	Bench press
6 ft 4 3/8 in (1.94 m)	291 lb (132 kg)	33 1/2 in (0.85 m)	10 1/8 in (0.26 m)	6 ft 8 1/2 in (2.04 m)	5.12 s	1.76 s	2.90 s	4.72 s	7.71 s	31.5 in (0.80 m)	9 ft 0 in (2.74 m)	21 reps
All values from Pro Day

=== Miami Dolphins ===
On May 13, 2022, Williams signed with the Miami Dolphins. However, he was released halfway through the preseason on August 16, 2022.

=== Memphis Showboats ===
In the 2023 season, Williams played for the Memphis Showboats. He recorded 21 tackles and 5.5 sacks.

=== Toronto Argonauts ===
On January 24, 2024, it was announced that Williams had signed with the Toronto Argonauts. He made the team's active roster following training camp in 2024 and made his CFL debut on June 9, 2024, against the BC Lions.

In the 2024 season, Williams played in nine regular season games, starting in three, where he had 12 defensive tackles, two sacks, and one fumble recovery. He also played in all three post-season games, including the 111th Grey Cup where he had one defensive tackle in the Argonauts' 41–24 victory over the Winnipeg Blue Bombers.

In 2025, Williams played and started in the first ten regular season games where he recorded ten defensive tackles and one fumble recovery for a touchdown. He was released on August 26, 2025, after the emergence of Ricky Correia.

=== Edmonton Elks ===
On September 4, 2025, Williams signed with the Edmonton Elks.

== Personal life ==
Williams was born to parents Bernie and Ray Williams.
