= Ricky Correia =

American football player (born 2002)

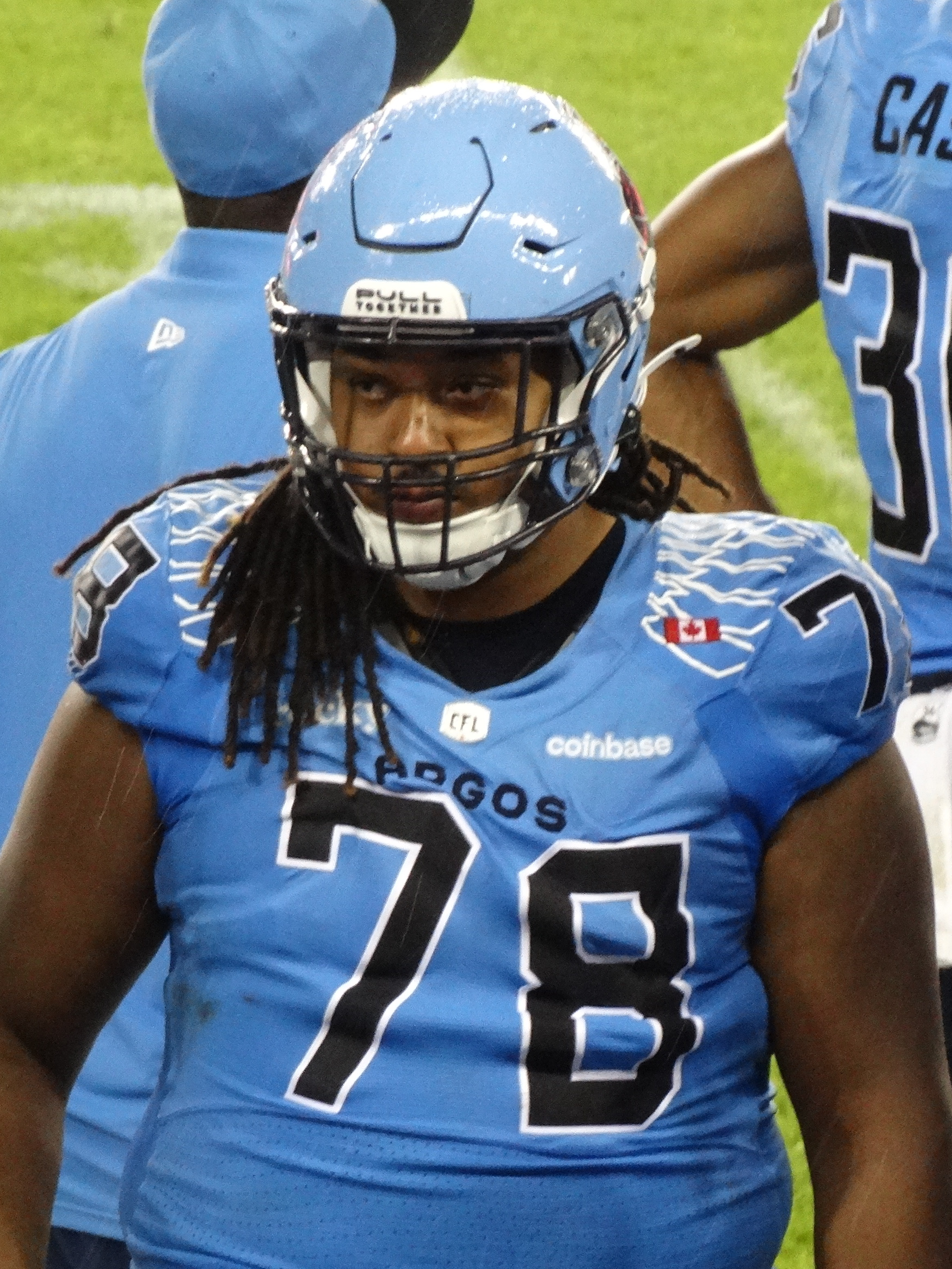
- Correia with the Toronto Argonauts in 2025

No. 91 – Rhode Island Breakers
- Position: Defensive lineman
- Roster status: Active

Personal information
- Born: May 2, 2002 (age 24); Fresno, California, U.S.
- Listed height: 6 ft 3 in (1.91 m)
- Listed weight: 322 lb (146 kg)

Career information
- High school: Central (Fresno, California)
- College: California (2020–2024)

Career history
- 2025: Toronto Argonauts
- 2026: Birmingham Stallions
- 2027–present: Rhode Island Breakers
- Stats at CFL.ca

Ricky Correia (born May 2, 2002) is an American professional football defensive lineman for the Rhode Island Breakers of the United Football League (UFL). Correia previously played college football for the California Golden Bears.

== College career ==
Correia played college football for the California Golden Bears from 2020 to 2024. In his career at Cal, he played in 45 games, recording 105 tackles, including five tackles for a loss, 2.5 sacks, three pass knockdowns and one fumble recovery.

== Professional career ==
Pre-draft measurables
Height	Weight	Arm length	Hand span	Wingspan	40-yard dash	10-yard split	20-yard split	20-yard shuttle	Three-cone drill	Vertical jump	Broad jump	Bench press
6 ft 3 1/2 in (1.92 m)	322 lb (146 kg)	32 7/8 in (0.84 m)	9 1/2 in (0.24 m)	6 ft 7 in (2.01 m)	5.56 s	1.88 s	3.19 s	4.76 s	7.69 s	23.0 in (0.58 m)	8 ft 3 in (2.51 m)	12 reps
All values from Pro Day

On July 21, 2025, it was announced that the Toronto Argonauts signed Correia to the practice roster. He was promoted to the active roster on July 24 and made his professional debut against the Winnipeg Blue Bombers on July 26. Correia logged his first tackle, also against Winnipeg, on August 1. He reverted to the practice roster on August 7. Correia was activated on August 22 due to an injury for Jordan Williams, ahead a game against the BC Lions.
