= Jayden Peevy =

American football player (born 1999)

No. 92 – Rhode Island Breakers
- Position: Defensive end
- Roster status: Active

Personal information
- Born: September 3, 1999 (age 27); Bellaire, Texas, U.S.
- Listed height: 6 ft 5 in (1.96 m)
- Listed weight: 307 lb (139 kg)

Career information
- High school: Bellaire (Bellaire, Texas)
- College: Texas A&M
- NFL draft: 2022: undrafted

Career history
- Tennessee Titans (2022–2023); Carolina Panthers (2023)*; Cleveland Browns (2024)*; Carolina Panthers (2024); Houston Texans (2024)*; New Orleans Saints (2025)*; Orlando Storm (2026)*; Birmingham Stallions (2026); Rhode Island Breakers (2027–present)
- * Offseason or practice squad member only

Career NFL statistics as of 2023
- Games played: 2
- Stats at Pro Football Reference

Jayden Peevy (born September 3, 1999) is an American professional football defensive end for the Rhode Island Breakers of the United Football League (UFL). He played college football for the Texas A&M Aggies and was signed by the Tennessee Titans as an undrafted free agent in 2022.

== Early life ==
Peevy was born on September 3, 1999, in Bellaire, Texas. He attended Bellaire High School and played football, recording 77 tackles and 10 sacks as a senior while being named U.S. Army All-American. He was a four-star recruit and was ranked the fifth-best defensive end in Texas, the ninth-best strongside defensive end nationally, and the 34th-best in the state.

== College career ==
Peevy initially committed to play college football at Baylor, but switched to Texas A&M after the firing of Baylor's coach.

As a true freshman in 2017, Peevy appeared in 12 games for Texas A&M and posted 17 tackles as well as one sack. The following year, he appeared in all 13 games and recorded nine tackles. He also blocked two field goals, both of which came in the same game (versus UAB). As a junior in 2019, Peevy played 12 games, three of which he started, and tallied 34 tackles with 1.5 sacks.

Peevy became a full-time starter in 2020, starting all 10 games in a season shortened by COVID-19 and again making 34 tackles, although he appeared in two less games than the prior year. He also recorded one sack. Peevy opted to return to the team in 2021 after being given one extra year of eligibility. He posted 43 tackles and two sacks, and was invited to the NFLPA Collegiate Bowl. After a game against Colorado, he was named conference defensive lineman of the week. At the team banquet at the end of the year, Peevy was given Texas A&M's "Mr. Dependable" Award. He finished his college career with 58 games played, 137 total tackles and 7.5 sacks.

== Professional career ==
Pre-draft measurables
Height	Weight	Arm length	Hand span	Wingspan	40-yard dash	10-yard split	20-yard split	Vertical jump	Broad jump
6 ft 5 3/8 in (1.97 m)	308 lb (140 kg)	35 1/2 in (0.90 m)	10 1/2 in (0.27 m)	7 ft 1 3/8 in (2.17 m)	5.30 s	1.92 s	3.03 s	29.5 in (0.75 m)	8 ft 4 in (2.54 m)
All values from NFL Combine/Pro Day

=== Tennessee Titans ===
After going unselected in the 2022 NFL draft, Peevy was signed by the Tennessee Titans as an undrafted free agent. He was released at the final roster cuts, and afterwards was re-signed to the practice squad. Peevy was elevated to the active roster for the Titans' Week 17 game with the Dallas Cowboys, and made his NFL debut in the loss, appearing on 27 defensive snaps. He signed a reserve/future contract on January 10, 2023.

Peevy made the Titans' final roster in 2023. However, he was released after playing in only one game on September 19, 2023 and re-signed to the practice squad. He was released on October 9.

=== Carolina Panthers (first stint) ===
On October 11, 2023, Peevy signed with the Carolina Panthers practice squad. He was not signed to a reserve/future contract and thus became a free agent at the end of the season upon the expiration of his practice squad contract.

=== Cleveland Browns ===
On January 16, 2024, Peevy signed a reserve/future contract with the Cleveland Browns. He was waived on June 7.

=== Carolina Panthers (second stint) ===
On August 10, 2024, Peevy signed with the Panthers. He was waived on August 28, and re-signed to the practice squad. He was promoted to the active roster on September 7. He was released on October 8 and re-signed to the practice squad two days later. He was released on October 22.

=== Houston Texans ===
On November 6, 2024, Peevy was signed to the Houston Texans practice squad. He signed a reserve/future contract with Houston on January 21, 2025. Peevy was waived by the Texans on May 1.

=== New Orleans Saints ===
On August 12, 2025, Peevy signed with the New Orleans Saints. He was waived on August 26 as part of final roster cuts.

=== Orlando Storm ===
On January 14, 2026, Peevy was selected by the Orlando Storm in the 2026 UFL Draft. He was released on March 19.

=== Birmingham Stallions ===
On April 27, 2026, Peevy signed with the Birmingham Stallions of the United Football League (UFL).
