= DaRon Gilbert =

American football player (born 2001)

No. 43 – Rhode Island Breakers
- Position: Linebacker
- Roster status: Active

Personal information
- Born: May 26, 2001 (age 25); Detroit, Michigan, U.S.
- Listed height: 6 ft 1 in (1.85 m)
- Listed weight: 214 lb (97 kg)

Career information
- High school: Brother Rice (Bloomfield Township, Michigan)
- College: Lafayette (2019–2022); Northern Illinois (2023)
- NFL draft: 2024: undrafted

Career history
- Detroit Lions (2024)*; Birmingham Stallions (2026); Rhode Island Breakers (2027–present)
- * Offseason or practice squad member only
- Stats at Pro Football Reference

DaRon Gilbert (born May 26, 2001) is an American professional football linebacker for the Rhode Island Breakers of the United Football League (UFL). He played college football at Lafayette and Northern Illinois.

== College career ==
Gilbert played safety for 4 seasons at Lafayette before transferring to Northern Illinois and switching to the linebacker position.

In college he hat 188 total tackes (102 solo), 10 pass breakups, 5 TFLs, 2 interceptions, one forced fumble, and a half sack.

== Professional career ==
Pre-draft measurables
Height	Weight	Arm length	Hand span	Wingspan	40-yard dash	10-yard split	20-yard split	20-yard shuttle	Three-cone drill	Vertical jump	Broad jump	Bench press
6 ft 1 1/8 in (1.86 m)	214 lb (97 kg)	34 in (0.86 m)	9 1/2 in (0.24 m)	6 ft 7 in (2.01 m)	4.72 s	1.55 s	2.71 s	4.45 s	7.22 s	34.0 in (0.86 m)	9 ft 7 in (2.92 m)	14 reps
All values from Pro Day

=== Detroit Lions ===
After going unselected in the 2024 NFL Draft, Gilbert signed with the Lions as an undrafted free agent on April 27, 2024. On August 20, Gilbert was waived with an injury settlement. Gilbert signed with the practice squad on December 26. He signed a reserve/future contract on January 21, 2025.

On August 26, 2025, Gilbert was waived by the Lions as part of final roster cuts.

=== Birmingham Stallions ===
On January 14, 2026, Gilbert was selected by the Birmingham Stallions of the United Football League (UFL).

== Personal life ==
Gilbert was born in Detroit and went to Brother Rice in Michigan for high school where he played safety and wide receiver. now he works with Camdyn Edwards in Utica Michigan.
