= Jaydon Mickens =

American football player (born 1994)

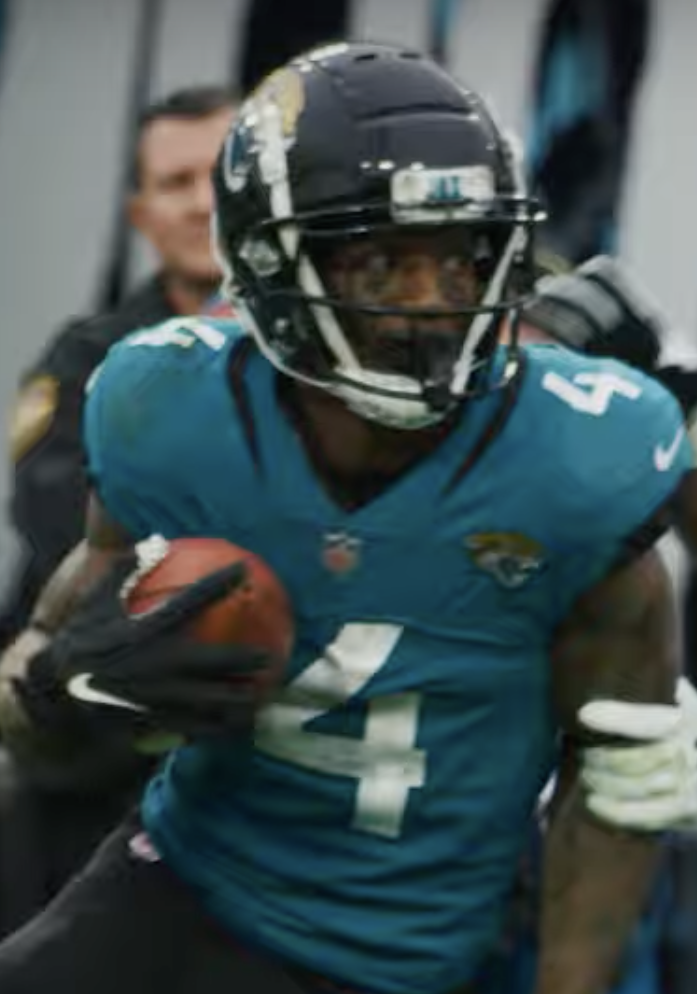
- Mickens with the Jacksonville Jaguars in 2021

No. 12 – Rhode Island Breakers
- Position: Wide receiver
- Roster status: Active

Personal information
- Born: April 21, 1994 (age 32); Los Angeles, California, U.S.
- Listed height: 5 ft 10 in (1.78 m)
- Listed weight: 172 lb (78 kg)

Career information
- High school: Susan Miller Dorsey (Los Angeles)
- College: Washington (2012–2015)
- NFL draft: 2016: undrafted

Career history
- Oakland Raiders (2016–2017)*; Jacksonville Jaguars (2017–2018); Carolina Panthers (2019)*; Tampa Bay Buccaneers (2019–2021); Jacksonville Jaguars (2021); New York Giants (2022–2023)*; Indianapolis Colts (2023)*; DC Defenders (2025); Birmingham Stallions (2026); Rhode Island Breakers (2027–present)
- * Offseason or practice squad member only

Awards and highlights
- Super Bowl champion (LV); UFL champion (2025)

Career NFL statistics
- Receptions: 15
- Receiving yards: 145
- Receiving touchdowns: 2
- Return yards: 1,392
- Return touchdowns: 1
- Stats at Pro Football Reference

Jaydon Mickens (born April 21, 1994) is an American professional football wide receiver for the Rhode Island Breakers of the United Football League (UFL). He played college football for the Washington Huskies, and signed with the Oakland Raiders as an undrafted free agent in 2016. Mickens won a Super Bowl title as part of the Tampa Bay Buccaneers in Super Bowl LV.

== College career ==
Mickens played college football at Washington, where he appeared in the majority of his career by changing his jersey number from 4 to 1 during his junior and senior years before he qualified for the 2016 NFL draft. He had good, but unspectacular numbers, leading the team in receptions and receiving yards his junior and senior seasons but never cracking the Top 10 in the conference; he was the Huskies kick returner his freshman year, but only returned four punts over his college career, recording no touchdowns in either role.

== Professional career ==
Pre-draft measurables
Height	Weight	Arm length	Hand span	Wingspan	40-yard dash	10-yard split	20-yard split	20-yard shuttle	Three-cone drill	Vertical jump	Broad jump	Bench press
5 ft 9 7/8 in (1.77 m)	174 lb (79 kg)	28 7/8 in (0.73 m)	9 in (0.23 m)	5 ft 10 5/8 in (1.79 m)	4.51 s	1.57 s	2.62 s	3.87 s	6.58 s	35.5 in (0.90 m)	10 ft 1 in (3.07 m)	15 reps
All values from Pro Day

=== Oakland Raiders ===
Mickens signed with the Oakland Raiders as an undrafted free agent on May 12, 2016. He was waived by the Raiders on September 3, and was signed to the practice squad the next day. After spending the entire 2016 season on the practice squad, he signed a reserve/future contract with the Raiders on January 9, 2017. Mickens was waived by the team on September 2.

=== Jacksonville Jaguars (first stint) ===
On September 19, 2017, Mickens signed with the Jacksonville Jaguars' practice squad. He was promoted to the active roster on October 21. In Week 9, against the Cincinnati Bengals, he recorded a 63-yard punt return touchdown in the fourth quarter in a 23–7 win, earning him American Football Conference (AFC) Special Teams Player of the Week. In Week 14, Mickens had a 72-yard punt return, but was stopped on the one-yard line, which set up a touchdown to give the Jaguars a 14-point lead over the Seattle Seahawks, again winning AFC Special Teams Player of the Week honors. As a receiver, he recorded one reception prior to Week 15, but had four for 61 yards and two second quarter touchdowns in a 45–7 win over the Houston Texans.

On October 15, 2018, Mickens was placed on injured reserve after suffering a fractured ankle in Week 6.

=== Carolina Panthers ===
On July 24, 2019, Mickens was signed by the Carolina Panthers. He was waived during final roster cuts on August 30.

=== Tampa Bay Buccaneers ===
On December 19, 2019, Mickens was signed to the Tampa Bay Buccaneers' practice squad. He was promoted to the active roster on December 24. Mickens was waived by Tampa Bay on July 31, 2020, but re-signed on August 9. He was placed on the reserve/COVID-19 list by the team on November 14, and activated on November 30. Mickens was waived on December 7, and re-signed to the practice squad two days later. On December 30, Mickens was signed to the active roster. Mickens was the Buccaneers' kick returner for Super Bowl LV, a 31–9 victory over the Kansas City Chiefs.

On August 31, 2021, Mickens was released by the Buccaneers and re-signed to the practice squad. He was signed to the active roster on September 10. Mickens was waived on October 18 and re-signed to the practice squad.

=== Jacksonville Jaguars (second stint) ===
On November 24, 2021, Mickens was signed by the Jaguars off the Buccaneers practice squad. In the 2021 season, Mickens mainly contributed on special teams for the Buccaneers and Jaguars in 11 total games.

=== New York Giants ===
On December 14, 2022, Mickens was signed to the New York Giants' practice squad. He signed a reserve/future contract with New York on January 22, 2023. Mickens was released by the Giants on August 27.

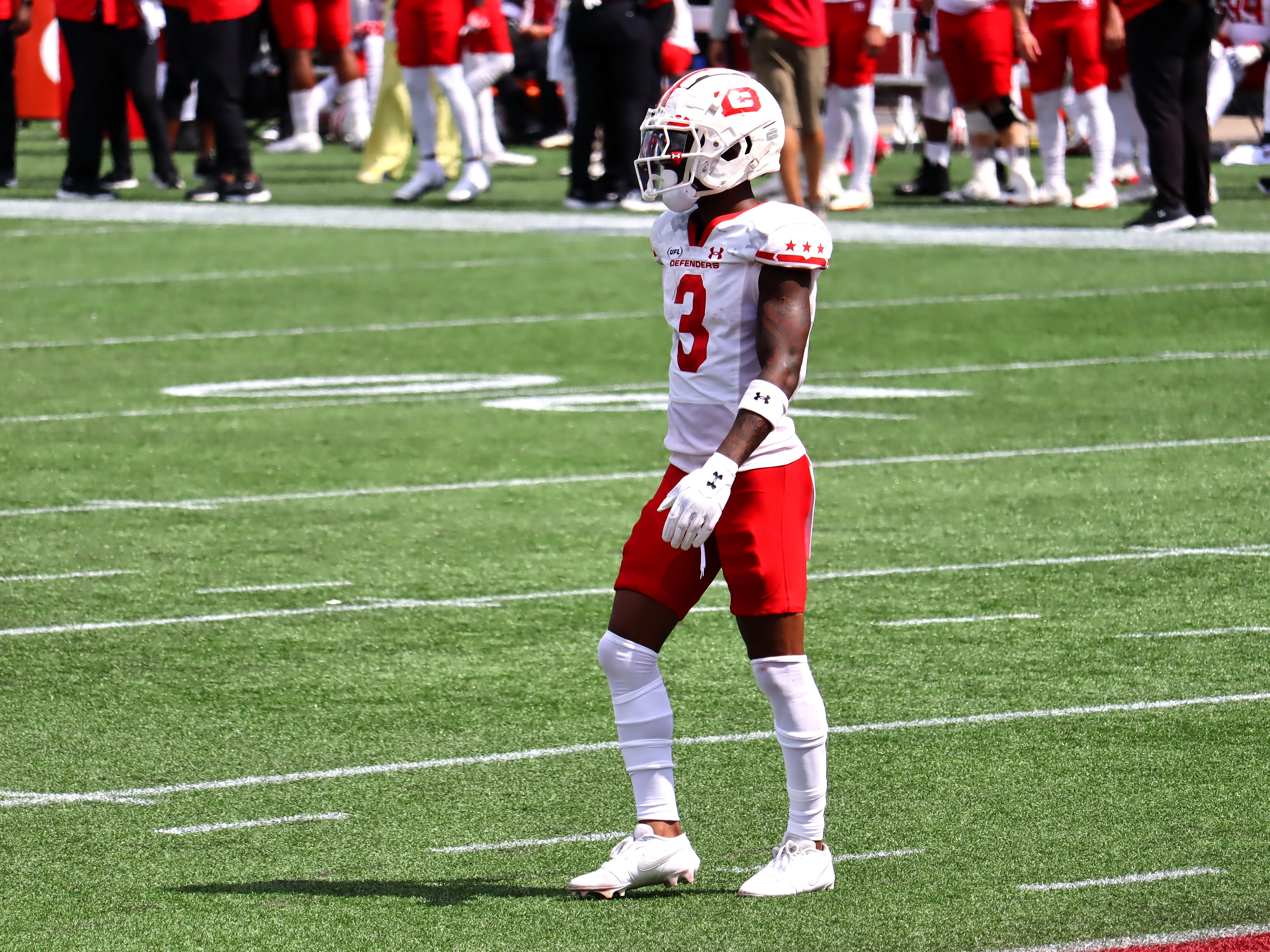
Mickens with the DC Defenders in 2025

=== Indianapolis Colts ===
On December 19, 2023, Mickens was signed to the Indianapolis Colts' practice squad. He was not signed to a reserve/future contract after the season and thus became a free agent upon the expiration of his practice squad contract.

=== DC Defenders ===
On January 30, 2025, Mickens signed with the DC Defenders of the United Football League (UFL). He helped lead the Defenders to the 2025 UFL championship, and was the oldest player on the field.

=== Birmingham Stallions ===
On January 13, 2026, Mickens was selected by the Birmingham Stallions in the 2026 UFL draft.

== Personal life ==
Mickens was arrested in Los Angeles on a felony firearm charge on March 11, 2021.
