= Jabre Barber =

American football player (born 2002)

No. 80 – Rhode Island Breakers
- Position: Wide receiver
- Roster status: Active

Personal information
- Born: January 16, 2002 (age 24); Dothan, Alabama, U.S.
- Listed height: 5 ft 8 in (1.73 m)
- Listed weight: 179 lb (81 kg)

Career information
- High school: Dothan (Dothan, Alabama)
- College: Troy (2020–2023); Texas A&M (2024)
- NFL draft: 2025: undrafted

Career history
- Birmingham Stallions (2026); Rhode Island Breakers (2027–present)

Jabre Tyere Barber (born January 16, 2002) is an American professional football wide receiver for the Rhode Island Breakers of the United Football League (UFL). He played for the Troy Trojans and Texas A&M Aggies.

== Early life ==
Barber attended Dothan High School in Dothan, Alabama. As a senior, Barber recorded 50 receptions for 789 yards and six touchdowns, while also rushing for 136 yards and six touchdowns. Following his high school career, he committed to play college football at Troy University.

== College career ==
=== Troy ===
After recording no offensive snaps and playing exclusively on special teams in 2020, Barber's production increased the following season, hauling in 32 receptions for 324 yards and three touchdowns. In 2022, he began to have a breakout season, posting 25 receptions for 351 yards and two touchdowns before an injury prematurely ended his season. Barber returned from injury the next season, tallying 75 receptions for 999 yards and five touchdowns before entering the transfer portal.

=== Texas A&M ===
On January 5, 2024, Barber announced that he would be transferring to Texas A&M University to play for the Aggies.

Year	Team	Games	Receiving			
Year	Team	GP	Rec	Yards	Avg	TD
2021	Troy	12	32	324	10.1	3
2022	Troy	6	25	351	14.0	2
2023	Troy	14	75	999	13.3	5
2024	Texas A&M	12	38	381	10.0	2
Career		44	170	2,055	12.1	12

== Professional career ==
Pre-draft measurables
Height	Weight	Arm length	Hand span	Wingspan	40-yard dash	10-yard split	20-yard split	20-yard shuttle	Three-cone drill	Vertical jump	Broad jump	Bench press
5 ft 8 1/2 in (1.74 m)	179 lb (81 kg)	30 1/8 in (0.77 m)	8 3/4 in (0.22 m)	6 ft 0 1/4 in (1.84 m)	4.59 s	1.53 s	2.63 s	4.14 s	6.96 s	30.0 in (0.76 m)	10 ft 2 in (3.10 m)	8 reps
All values from Pro Day

Barber was not selected in the 2025 NFL draft. He received a rookie minicamp invite from the Cleveland Browns
