= Lukas Denis =

American football safety (born 1997)

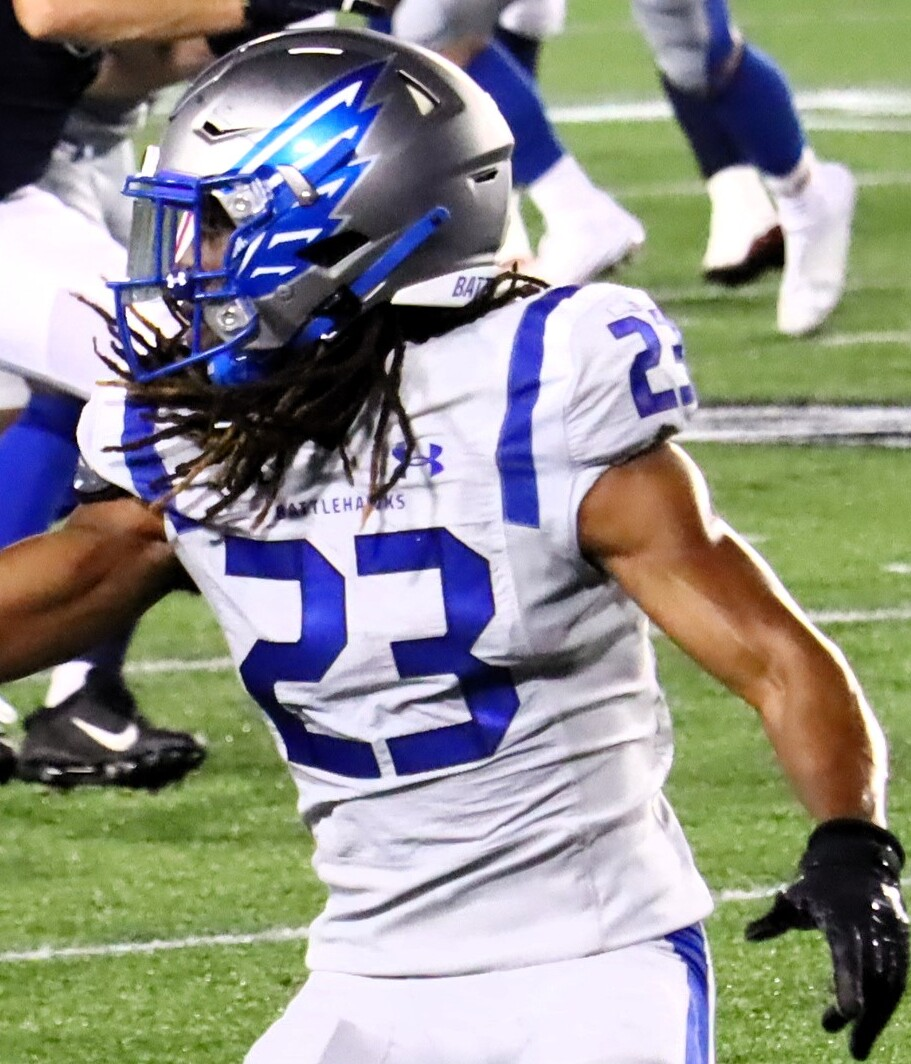
- Denis with the St. Louis Battlehawks in 2025

No. 23 – Rhode Island Breakers
- Position: Safety
- Roster status: Active

Personal information
- Born: April 13, 1997 (age 29)
- Listed height: 5 ft 11 in (1.80 m)
- Listed weight: 180 lb (82 kg)

Career information
- High school: Everett
- College: Boston College (2015–2018)
- NFL draft: 2019: undrafted

Career history
- Tampa Bay Buccaneers (2019)*; Massachusetts Pirates (2022); St. Louis Battlehawks (2023); Atlanta Falcons (2023)*; St. Louis Battlehawks (2025); Birmingham Stallions (2026); Rhode Island Breakers (2027–present)
- * Offseason or practice squad member only
- Stats at Pro Football Reference

Lukas Alexander Denis (born April 13, 1997) is an American professional football safety for the Rhode Island Breakers of the United Football League (UFL). He played college football at Boston College.

== College career ==
A three-star recruit, Denis committed to play college football at Boston College. He finished his collegiate career playing in over 30 games while recording over 139 tackles, and 9 interceptions.

== Professional career ==
Pre-draft measurables
Height	Weight	Arm length	Hand span	Wingspan	40-yard dash	10-yard split	20-yard split	20-yard shuttle	Three-cone drill	Vertical jump	Broad jump	Bench press
5 ft 11 1/4 in (1.81 m)	190 lb (86 kg)	31 1/4 in (0.79 m)	9 1/2 in (0.24 m)	6 ft 2 7/8 in (1.90 m)	4.64 s	1.53 s	2.71 s	4.09 s	6.89 s	33.5 in (0.85 m)	9 ft 8 in (2.95 m)	16 reps
All values from NFL Combine

=== Tampa Bay Buccaneers ===
After going undrafted in the 2019 NFL draft, Denis signed with the Tampa Bay Buccaneers on April 28, 2019. He was released by the Buccaneers on August 30.

=== Massachusetts Pirates ===
On March 11, 2022, Denis signed with the Massachusetts Pirates of the Indoor Football League

=== St. Louis Battlehawks ===
On November 17, 2022, Denis was drafted by the St. Louis Battlehawks of the XFL. He played in 10 games for St. Louis (including seven starts) and recorded 37 tackles, two interceptions, and one sack.

=== Atlanta Falcons ===
On May 15, 2023, Denis signed with the Atlanta Falcons. He was released by Atlanta on August 29, but was re-signed to the team's practice squad on September 5. Following the end of the regular season, Denis signed a reserve/future contract with Atlanta on January 10, 2024.

On August 25, 2024, Denis was waived by the Falcons.

=== St. Louis Battlehawks (second stint) ===
On December 6, 2024, Denis signed with the St. Louis Battlehawks of the United Football League (UFL).

=== Birmingham Stallions ===
On January 13, 2026, Denis was drafted by the Birmingham Stallions of the United Football League (UFL) in the 2026 draft.
