= Daewood Davis =

American football wide receiver (born 1999)

No. 11 – Rhode Island Breakers
- Position: Wide receiver
- Roster status: Active

Personal information
- Born: January 23, 1999 (age 27); Broward County, Florida, U.S.
- Listed height: 6 ft 1 in (1.85 m)
- Listed weight: 196 lb (89 kg)

Career information
- High school: Deerfield Beach (FL)
- College: Oregon (2017–2020); Western Kentucky (2021–2022)
- NFL draft: 2023: undrafted

Career history
- Miami Dolphins (2023)*; Memphis Showboats (2024); Carolina Panthers (2024)*; Memphis Showboats (2025); Birmingham Stallions (2026); Rhode Island Breakers (2027–present)
- * Offseason or practice squad member only

Awards and highlights
- All-UFL Team (2024)
- Stats at Pro Football Reference

Daewood Davis (born January 23, 1999) is an American professional football wide receiver for the Rhode Island Breakers of the United Football League (UFL).. He played college football for the Oregon Ducks and the Western Kentucky Hilltoppers and has previously played for the Miami Dolphins of the National Football League (NFL).

== Early life ==
Davis grew up in Broward County, Florida, and attended Deerfield Beach High School where he played football and track & field. During his high school football career, he was named third-team All-Broward County after leading the team to an 8A state semifinal appearance as a senior. He was rated as a three-star recruit and originally committed to play for South Florida but he instead committed to Oregon over other offers from Bowling Green, Cincinnati, Duke, FIU, FAU, Illinois, Indiana, Kentucky, Louisville, Marshall, Miami, Nebraska, North Carolina State, Ohio, Penn State, South Florida, Syracuse, Tulane, Utah and West Virginia.

== College career ==
=== Oregon ===
Davis redshirted during his true freshman season in 2017. During the 2018 season, he played in seven games and had a 13-yard reception against the Week 3 game against San Jose Spartans. After the season, his position was moved from a wide receiver to a cornerback. Davis eventually was moved back to being a wide receiver after playing as a cornerback during fall camp. During the 2019 season, he played in 13 games while having nine receptions for 89 yards and a touchdown, and having four of those receptions result in a first down. During the 2020 season, Davis played in only one game against Stanford. On January 2, 2021, Davis announced that he would be entering the transfer portal. On January 5, 2021, he announced that he would be transferring to Western Kentucky.

=== Western Kentucky ===
During the 2021 season, Davis started in all 14 games while also making it to the 2021 Conference USA Football Championship Game. He finished the season with 43 receptions for 763 passing yards and eight touchdowns and also completed 105 receiving yards. On July 21, 2022, Davis was named to the Biletnikoff Watch List. During the 2022 season, he started the first 12 games and missed two games due to an injury and finished the season with catching 63 passes for 872 passing yards and seven touchdowns. He was later recognized as a 2022 Conference USA Honorable Mention.

== Professional career ==
Pre-draft measurables
Height	Weight	Arm length	Hand span	Wingspan	40-yard dash	10-yard split	20-yard split	Vertical jump	Broad jump	Bench press
6 ft 0 7/8 in (1.85 m)	196 lb (89 kg)	31 1/2 in (0.80 m)	9 1/2 in (0.24 m)	6 ft 3 7/8 in (1.93 m)	4.52 s	1.58 s	2.59 s	34.0 in (0.86 m)	10 ft 3 in (3.12 m)	6 reps
All values from Pro Day

=== Miami Dolphins ===
After going undrafted in the 2023 NFL draft, Davis signed with the Miami Dolphins on April 30, 2023. He was waived on August 29, 2023 due to his in-game injury.

On August 26, 2023, during the fourth quarter of the Week 3 preseason game versus the Jacksonville Jaguars, Davis suffered an injury after sustaining a hit from Jaguars linebacker Dequan Jackson while the wideout was attempting to catch a pass from teammate James Blackman. Jackson appeared to make helmet-to-helmet contact with Davis, drawing an unnecessary roughness flag after the play and leaving Davis immobilized and later carted off the field. The game was later suspended with 8 minutes and 32 seconds remaining, with Dolphins head coach Mike McDaniel saying, "The two teams agreed that football shouldn't be played anymore tonight." This was the second game to be suspended in the 2023 NFL season as the first involved Patriots cornerback Isaiah Bolden after a Week 2 preseason game against the Packers. The next day on August 27, 2023, the Dolphins had released a statement saying that Davis was released from the hospital and would be traveling back to Miami with the team personnel. However two days later on August 29, 2023, Davis was waived by the Dolphins with an injury settlement ahead of the team's cuts for the 53-player roster limit.

=== Memphis Showboats (first stint) ===
On October 1, 2023, Davis was signed by the Memphis Showboats of the United States Football League (USFL). He was named to the 2024 All-UFL team on June 5, 2024. His contract with the team was terminated on June 17, 2024 to sign with an NFL team.

=== Carolina Panthers ===
On June 18, 2024, Davis signed with the Carolina Panthers. He was waived with an injury designation on July 31.

=== Memphis Showboats (second stint) ===
Davis re-signed with the Memphis Showboats on September 26, 2024. He was placed on injured reserve at the start of the 2025 season, and activated on April 28, 2025.

=== Birmingham Stallions ===
On January 13, 2026, Davis was selected by the Birmingham Stallions in the 2026 UFL Draft.
