= Randy Charlton =

American football player (born 1999)

Profile
- Position: Defensive end

Personal information
- Born: October 7, 1999 (age 27); Miami, Florida, U.S.
- Listed height: 6 ft 3 in (1.91 m)
- Listed weight: 275 lb (125 kg)

Career information
- High school: Miami Southridge Senior (Miami, Florida)
- College: UCF (2018–2020); Mississippi State (2021–2022)
- NFL draft: 2023: undrafted

Career history
- Miami Dolphins (2023)*; Edmonton Elks (2024)*; Orlando Pirates (2026); Birmingham Stallions (2026)
- * Offseason or practice squad member only

Randy Lamount Charlton (born October 7, 1999) is an American professional football defensive end. He played college football at Mississippi State University. He was a member of the Edmonton Elks of the Canadian Football League (CFL).

== Early life ==
Charlton attended Miami Southridge Senior High School in Miami, Florida, where he was named Honorable Mention All-State as a junior, while recording double-digit sacks for the Spartans and helped lead his team to the 2017 Regional Semifinals.

== College career ==
In 2018, Charlton enrolled at the University of Central Florida, where he played in all 13 games, recording 21 tackles, ten solo and three tackles for loss of the season. As a sophomore in 2019, he played in 10 games, starting five contests, where he contributed twenty-eight tackles, three and a half for loss, one sack, and three quarterback hurries. In 2020, Charlton appeared in 10 games with five starts. He recorded 18 tackles and 5 tackles for loss.

In 2021, Charlton transferred to Mississippi State University, where he appeared in 12 games with 11 starts in his first season. He recorded thirty-five total tackles with fourteen solo-tackles, five tackles-for-loss, including four sacks on the season. In 2022, Charlton appeared in 13 games with 11 starts, where he finished with thirty-six total tackles including seven tackles for loss, four sacks, a pass breakup, and a forced fumble. After the season, he declared for the 2023 NFL Draft.

== Professional career ==
Pre-draft measurables
Height	Weight	Arm length	Hand span	Wingspan	40-yard dash	10-yard split	20-yard split	20-yard shuttle	Three-cone drill	Vertical jump	Broad jump	Bench press
6 ft 2 7/8 in (1.90 m)	265 lb (120 kg)	32 5/8 in (0.83 m)	9 7/8 in (0.25 m)	6 ft 8 3/8 in (2.04 m)	5.06 s	1.75 s	2.85 s	4.56 s	7.65 s	30.0 in (0.76 m)	9 ft 6 in (2.90 m)	22 reps
All values from Pro Day

=== Miami Dolphins ===
In 2023, Charlton signed with the Miami Dolphins as an Undrafted free agent. Charlton played three preseason games for the Miami Dolphins, recording one tackle, one sack and one pass deflection. He was placed on the practice squad and later released on September 4, 2023.

=== Edmonton Elks ===
On April 23, 2024, Charlton signed with the Edmonton Elks of the Canadian Football League (CFL). He was released on June 3, 2024.

=== Birmingham Stallions ===
On April 29, 2026, Charlton signed with the Birmingham Stallions of the United Football League (UFL).
