= Kobe Jones =

American football player (born 1998)

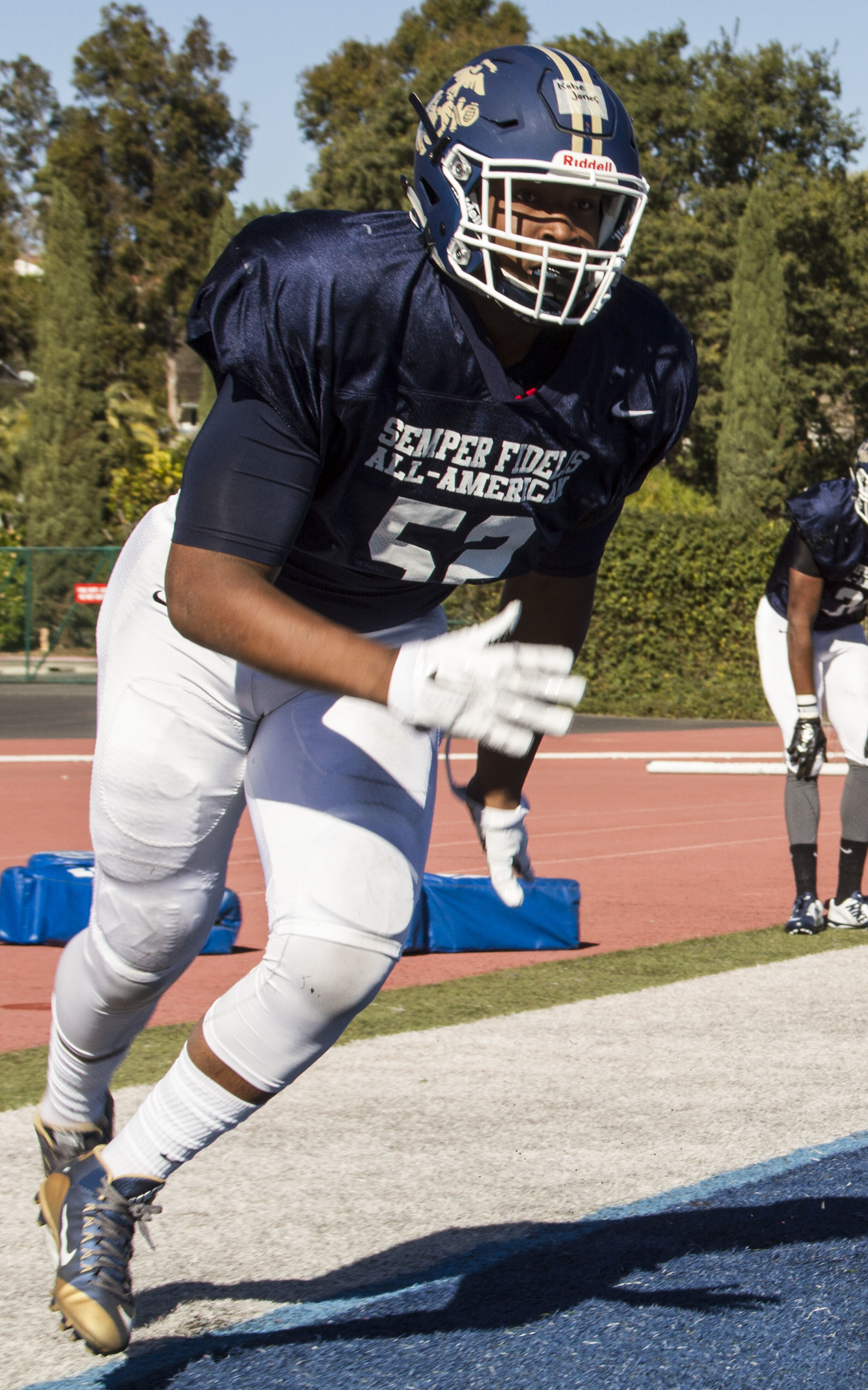
- Jones in 2015

Profile
- Position: Linebacker

Personal information
- Born: May 10, 1998 (age 28); Starkville, Mississippi, U.S.
- Listed height: 6 ft 3 in (1.91 m)
- Listed weight: 259 lb (117 kg)

Career information
- High school: Starkville (Starkville, Mississippi)
- College: Mississippi State (2016–2020)
- NFL draft: 2021: undrafted

Career history
- Atlanta Falcons (2021)*; Miami Dolphins (2021)*; Tennessee Titans (2021)*; Green Bay Packers (2022); Carolina Panthers (2022–2023)*; Hamilton Tiger-Cats (2024); New England Patriots (2024)*; San Antonio Brahmas (2025); Birmingham Stallions (2026)
- * Offseason or practice squad member only

Career NFL statistics as of 2025
- Games played: 2
- Stats at Pro Football Reference

Kobe Montrell Jones (born May 10, 1998) is an American professional football linebacker. He played college football at Mississippi State, and originally signed with the Atlanta Falcons as an undrafted free agent in 2021. Jones has also been a member of the Miami Dolphins, Tennessee Titans, Green Bay Packers, and Carolina Panthers.

== Early life ==
Kobe Jones was born on May 10, 1998, to Telesia and Melvin Jones. Jones attended Starkville High School where he helped lead them to the state championship for their region and as a result of his contributions was selected to be in the Mississippi-Alabama All-Star game.

== College career ==
Rated as a four-star recruit by ESPN, Jones chose to stay close to home and attend Mississippi State University, also located in Starkville, Mississippi. Jones chose to redshirt his freshman year and did not play as a true freshman. In Jones' redshirt freshman season, he appeared in all thirteen games and recorded his first sack in the last game of the season for Mississippi State, the 2017 TaxSlayer Bowl against Louisville. The next year, Jones again appeared in thirteen games and recorded his first start against LSU. In his Junior year, Jones would again appear in thirteen games and start one game, and additionally would be second on the team in sacks with four. In his senior and shortened year due to the COVID-19 pandemic, Jones would start eleven games and be named to the SEC Community Service Team.

== Professional career ==
Pre-draft measurables
Height	Weight	Arm length	Hand span	Wingspan	20-yard shuttle	Three-cone drill	Vertical jump	Broad jump	Bench press
6 ft 3 1/4 in (1.91 m)	255 lb (116 kg)	34 1/2 in (0.88 m)	9 1/2 in (0.24 m)	6 ft 11 5/8 in (2.12 m)	4.63 s	7.51 s	28.0 in (0.71 m)	9 ft 5 in (2.87 m)	15 reps
All values from Pro Day

=== Atlanta Falcons ===
After going undrafted in the 2021 NFL draft, Jones was signed as an undrafted free agent by the Atlanta Falcons. Jones was released before the regular season started to shorten the Falcons roster to the 53 man limit.

=== Miami Dolphins ===
Jones was briefly a member of the Miami Dolphins, being signed to the practice squad on November 17 and being waived on November 29.

=== Tennessee Titans ===
Jones was signed to a reserve/future contract by the Tennessee Titans in January 2022 but was later released on May 2, 2022, along with three other players.

=== Green Bay Packers ===
After being released from the Titans roster, on May 9, 2022, Jones was once again signed to a practice squad, this time to the Green Bay Packers. He was waived during final roster cuts on August 30, but re–signed to the team's practice squad the following day. After more than a year in the NFL, Jones was elevated to an active roster spot during the regular season for the Packers' week 8 game against the Buffalo Bills. He was released on November 1, 2022.

=== Carolina Panthers ===
On November 7, 2022, Jones signed with the Carolina Panthers practice squad. He signed a reserve/future contract on January 9, 2023. He was waived on August 29, 2023.

=== Hamilton Tiger-Cats ===
Jones was signed by the Hamilton Tiger-Cats of the Canadian Football League on May 13, 2024.

=== New England Patriots ===
On August 20, 2024, Jones signed with the New England Patriots. He was waived on August 27.

=== San Antonio Brahmas ===
On October 7, 2024, Jones signed with the San Antonio Brahmas of the United Football League (UFL).
