= Lance Boykin =

American football player (born 2000)

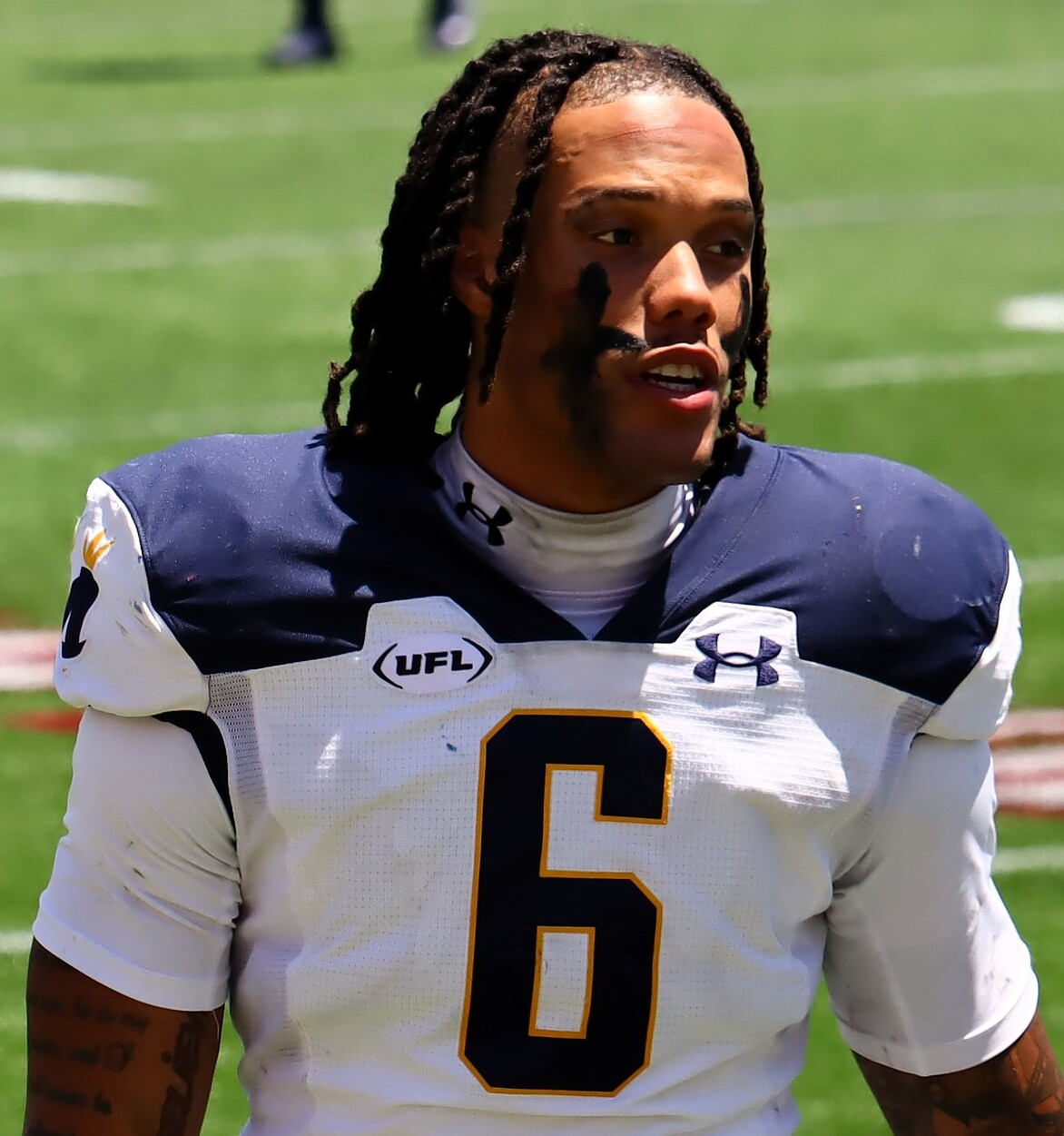
- Boykin with the Memphis Showboats in 2025

No. 45 – Calgary Stampeders
- Position: Cornerback
- Roster status: Active
- CFL status: American

Personal information
- Born: August 31, 2000 (age 26); High Point, North Carolina, U.S.
- Listed height: 6 ft 2 in (1.88 m)
- Listed weight: 205 lb (93 kg)

Career information
- High school: High Point Christian Academy (High Point, North Carolina)
- College: Old Dominion (2018–2020); Coastal Carolina (2021–2022)
- NFL draft: 2023: undrafted

Career history
- Seattle Seahawks (2023–2024)*; Memphis Showboats (2025); Birmingham Stallions (2026); Calgary Stampeders (2026–present)
- * Offseason or practice squad member only
- Stats at Pro Football Reference

Lance Ryan-Young Boykin (born August 31, 2000) is an American professional football cornerback for the Calgary Stampeders of the Canadian Football League (CFL). He played college football at Old Dominion and Coastal Carolina. He signed with the Seahawks as an undrafted free agent in 2023.

== College career ==
Boykin played college football for the Old Dominion Monarchs from 2018 to 2020 and for the Coastal Carolina Chanticleers from 2021 to 2022, earning second-team all-conference honors in his final year.

== Professional career ==
Pre-draft measurables
| Height | Weight | Arm length | Hand span | Wingspan | 40-yard dash | 10-yard split | 20-yard split | 20-yard shuttle | Vertical jump | Broad jump | Bench press |
|---|---|---|---|---|---|---|---|---|---|---|---|
| 6 ft 2 3/8 in (1.89 m) | 200 lb (91 kg) | 32 3/8 in (0.82 m) | 9 3/4 in (0.25 m) | 6 ft 6 1/8 in (1.98 m) | 4.72 s | 1.66 s | 2.71 s | 4.39 s | 30.5 in (0.77 m) | 10 ft 4 in (3.15 m) | 13 reps |
All values from NFL Combine/Pro Day

=== Seattle Seahawks ===
On May 12, 2023, the Seattle Seahawks signed Boykin to a three-year, $2.696 million contract as an undrafted free agent. He was waived on August 29, 2023, and re-signed to the practice squad. He was not initially signed to a reserve/future contract after the season and thus became a free agent upon the expiration of his practice squad contract. However, on February 1, 2024, Boykin re–signed with Seattle on a reserve/future contract.

On July 18, 2024, Boykin was placed on the Active/Physically Unable to Perform (PUP) list. He was waived on August 27.

=== Memphis Showboats ===
On December 5, 2024, Boykin signed with the Memphis Showboats of the United Football League (UFL).

=== Birmingham Stallions ===
On January 13, 2026, McFarland was selected by the Birmingham Stallions in the 2026 UFL Draft.

=== Calgary Stampeders ===
On July 22, 2026, Boykin signed with the Calgary Stampeders of the Canadian Football League (CFL).
