= Isaac Ukwu =

American football player (born 1999)

Profile
- Position: Defensive end

Personal information
- Born: January 14, 1999 (age 27); Upper Marlboro, Maryland, U.S.
- Listed height: 6 ft 3 in (1.91 m)
- Listed weight: 261 lb (118 kg)

Career information
- High school: Wise (Upper Marlboro, Maryland)
- College: James Madison (2017–2022); Ole Miss (2023)
- NFL draft: 2024: undrafted

Career history
- Detroit Lions (2024–2025); Michigan Panthers (2026)*; Birmingham Stallions (2026)
- * Offseason or practice squad member only

Awards and highlights
- First-team All-Sun Belt (2022); Second-team All-CAA (2021)

Career NFL statistics as of 2024
- Total tackles: 3
- Stats at Pro Football Reference

Isaac Egboida Omiete Ukwu (born January 14, 1999) is an American professional football defensive end. He played college football for the James Madison Dukes and for the Ole Miss Rebels.

== Early life ==
Ukwu attended Dr. Henry A. Wise Jr. High School located in Upper Marlboro, Maryland. Coming out of high school, Ukwu decided to commit to play college football for the James Madison Dukes.

== College career ==
=== James Madison ===
During Ukwu's five-year career with James Madison from 2017 to 2022, he played in 28 games after suffering two season-ending knee injuries; he totaled 88 tackles, with 27.5 being for a loss, and 16.5 sacks, while being named all-conference twice. After the conclusion of the 2022 season, Ukwu entered his name into the NCAA transfer portal.

=== Ole Miss ===
Ukwu transferred to play for the Ole Miss Rebels. In Ukwu's lone season with Ole Miss, he notched 30 tackles and three and a half sacks.

== Professional career ==
Pre-draft measurables
Height	Weight	Arm length	Hand span	Wingspan	40-yard dash	10-yard split	20-yard split	20-yard shuttle	Three-cone drill	Vertical jump	Broad jump	Bench press
6 ft 2 5/8 in (1.90 m)	261 lb (118 kg)	33 in (0.84 m)	9 5/8 in (0.24 m)	6 ft 9 1/2 in (2.07 m)	4.88 s	1.65 s	2.80 s	4.50 s	7.35 s	36.0 in (0.91 m)	9 ft 11 in (3.02 m)	29 reps
All values from Pro Day

=== Detroit Lions ===
After not being selected in the 2024 NFL draft, Ukwu signed with the Detroit Lions as an undrafted free agent. He was also selected by the Michigan Panthers in the third round of the 2024 UFL draft on July 17.

During Ukwu's three preseason games, he tallied three sacks and a forced fumble while fighting for a spot on the Lions' 53-man roster. He was waived on August 27, and re-signed to the practice squad. He signed a reserve/future contract with Detroit on January 20, 2025.

Ukwu was waived by the Lions on August 26, 2025 as part of final roster cuts, and re-signed to the practice squad. He was released from the practice squad on September 4.

=== Michigan Panthers ===
On September 29, 2025, Ukwu signed with the Michigan Panthers of the United Football League (UFL).

=== Birmingham Stallions ===
On January 21, 2026, Ukwu signed with the Birmingham Stallions of the United Football League (UFL).
