= 2024 Houston Roughnecks season =

American professional football season

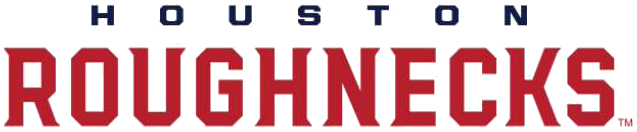
- Owner: National Spring Football League Enterprises Co, LLC, (Fox Sports)
- General manager: Lionel Vital
- Head coach: Curtis Johnson
- Home stadium: Rice Stadium

Results
- Record: 1–9
- Conference place: 4th in USFL Conference
- Playoffs: Did not qualify

Uniform

The 2024 Houston Roughnecks season was the third season of Houston Roughnecks (2024), an American football team based in Houston, Texas. The team's first season in the United Football League (UFL) after a merger in the offseason between the USFL and the XFL. Under the terms of the agreement, the team consists of the roster and coaching staff of the former USFL's two-season-old Houston Gamblers franchise, taking over the Roughnecks branding and home city previously used by the XFL team with the same name.

Renovations that began on the Roughnecks' home stadium in 2020 and 2023, TDECU Stadium, following the end of the 2023 University of Houston Cougars football season rendered that stadium unavailable for use for the 2024 season, while the Gamblers had never played in Houston, instead sharing stadiums with their rivals the Birmingham Stallions and Memphis Showboats under the USFL's hub model. The XFL stated that the Roughnecks would remain in Houston during the renovations, potentially at another stadium in the city. Rice Stadium, which hosted games in the USFL's predecessor The Spring League in 2021, and Shell Energy Stadium, home of the Houston Dynamo soccer team, were among the venues the league contacted about hosting the Roughnecks. On February 1, 2024, the league announced that home games would be hosted at Rice Stadium.

== Signees to the NFL ==
Player	Position	XFL team	Date	NFL team	Ref.
C. J. Brewer	DT	Houston Roughnecks	May 15	Tampa Bay Buccaneers	
Jack Heflin	DT	Houston Roughnecks	May 15	New Orleans Saints	

== Schedule ==
All times Central

Week	Day	Date	Kickoff	TV	Opponent	Results		Location	Attendance
Week	Day	Date	Kickoff	TV	Opponent	Score	Record	Location	Attendance
1	Sunday	March 31	2:00 p.m.	ESPN	Memphis Showboats	L 12–18	0–1	Rice Stadium	9,157
2	Sunday	April 7	3:00 p.m.	Fox	at DC Defenders	L 18–23	0–2	Audi Field	15,052
3	Sunday	April 14	11:00 a.m.	ABC	at Michigan Panthers	L 20–34	0–3	Ford Field	6,952
4	Sunday	April 21	1:00 p.m.	FS1	Arlington Renegades	W 17–9	1–3	Rice Stadium	7,179
5	Saturday	April 27	6:00 p.m.	Fox	Birmingham Stallions	L 9–32	1–4	Rice Stadium	6,285
6	Saturday	May 4	2:00 p.m.	Fox	at St. Louis Battlehawks	L 8–22	1–5	The Dome at America's Center	32,969
7	Sunday	May 12	2:00 p.m.	ESPN	San Antonio Brahmas	L 12–15	1–6	Rice Stadium	6,134
8	Saturday	May 18	7:00 p.m.	ESPN2	at Birmingham Stallions	L 28–35	1–7	Protective Stadium	10,245
9	Sunday	May 26	1:30 p.m.	Fox	Michigan Panthers	L 22–26	1–8	Rice Stadium	6,527
10	Sunday	June 2	6:00 p.m.	Fox	at Memphis Showboats	L 12–19	1–9	Simmons Bank Liberty Stadium	6,039

== Game summaries ==
=== Week 1: vs. Memphis Showboats ===
Week 1: Memphis Showboats at Houston Roughnecks – Game summary

Quarter	1	2	3	4	Total
Showboats	9	6	0	3	18
Roughnecks	0	3	0	9	12

at Rice Stadium, Houston, Texas

- Date: March 31
- Game time: 2:00 p.m. CDT
- Game weather: Haze, 79 °F (26 °C)
- Game attendance: 9,157
- Referee: Jeff Heaser
- TV announcers (ESPN): Lowell Galindo, Tom Luginbill, Harry Douglas and Kayla Burton
- Recap, Game Book

Game information

First quarter

- MEM – Matt Coghlin 27-yard field goal, 4:31. Showboats 3–0. Drive: 16 plays, 56 yards, 10:29.
- MEM – Christian McFarland 12-yard fumble return (one-point run failed), 3:42. Showboats 9–0.

Second quarter

- MEM – Vinny Papale 11-yard pass from Case Cookus (one-point pass failed), 6:57. Showboats 15–0. Drive: 11 plays, 74 yards, 7:57.
- HOU – J.J. Molson 55-yard field goal, 1:51. Showboats 15–3. Drive: 10 plays, 41 yards, 5:06.

Third quarter

- No scoring plays

Fourth quarter

- HOU – J.J. Molson 45-yard field goal, 13:46. Showboats 15–6. Drive: 7 plays, 63 yards, 3:12.
- MEM – Matt Coghlin 51-yard field goal, 8:44. Showboats 18–6. Drive: 9 plays, 20 yards, 5:02.
- HOU – Jarrett Guarantano 1-yard run (three-point pass failed), 5:29. Showboats 18–12. Drive: 3 plays, 17 yards, 1:09.

Top passers

- MEM – Case Cookus – 23/40, 204 yards, TD, INT
- HOU – Jarrett Guarantano – 16/21, 157 yards

Top rushers

- MEM – Case Cookus – 4 rushes, 16 yards
- HOU – Jarrett Guarantano – 2 rushes, 22 yards, TD

Top receivers

- MEM – Jonathan Adams – 4 receptions, 49 yards
- HOU – Kirk Merritt – 4 receptions, 33 yards

== Standings ==
2024 UFL standings
USFL Conference
Team	W	L	PCT	GB	TD+/-	TD+	TD-	DIV	PF	PA	DIFF	STK
(y) Birmingham Stallions	9	1	.900	–	11	31	20	6–0	265	180	85	W1
(x) Michigan Panthers	7	3	.700	2	5	27	22	4–2	228	189	39	L1
(e) Memphis Showboats	2	8	.200	7	-19	20	39	2–4	188	290	-102	W1
(e) Houston Roughnecks	1	9	.100	8	-12	17	29	0–6	158	233	-75	L6
XFL Conference
Team	W	L	PCT	GB	TD+/-	TD+	TD-	DIV	PF	PA	DIFF	STK
(y) St. Louis Battlehawks	7	3	.700	–	7	31	24	5–1	260	202	58	W1
(x) San Antonio Brahmas	7	3	.700	–	12	24	12	3–3	192	153	39	L1
(e) DC Defenders	4	6	.400	3	-2	24	26	2–4	209	251	-42	L1
(e) Arlington Renegades	3	7	.300	4	-2	26	28	2–4	247	249	-2	W2
(x)–clinched playoff berth; (y)–clinched division; (e)–eliminated from playoff contention

== Final roster ==
2024 Houston Roughnecks final roster
Quarterbacks: 6 Jarrett Guarantano; 14 Nolan Henderson; 7 Reid Sinnett; Running backs: 17 Ezra Gray; 22 Kirk Merritt; 5 T. J. Pledger; 8 Mark Thompson; Wide receivers: 18 Emmanuel Butler; 3 Keke Chism; 16 Cyril Grayson; 11 Justin Hall; 12 Brian Hightower; 1 Anthony Ratliff-Williams; 81 Reggie Roberson Jr.; Tight ends: 80 Braedon Bowman; 84 A. J. Lewis; 42 Clint Sigg	Offensive linemen: 79 Isaiah Battle T; 72 Cam Carter T; 74 Avery Gennesy G/T; 75 Shamarious Gilmore G; 76 Brandon Haskin T; 78 Braylon Jones G; 65 Jack Kramer C; 77 Justin Redd G; Defensive linemen: 2 Christopher Allen DE; 15 Ronheen Bingham DE; 50 Jeffery Johnson DT; 97 Glen Logan DT; 93 Chris Odom DE; 58 Adam Rodriguez DE; 94 Keonte Schad DT; 95 Ethan Westbrooks DT/DE	Linebackers: 52 D'Juan Hines; 28 Marvin Moody Jr.; 23 Christian Sam; 33 J. T. Tyler; Defensive backs: 20 Jamari Brown FS; 29 Corn Elder CB; 25 Mister Harriel FS; 4 Jimmy Moreland CB; 27 Jai Nunn-Liddell CB; 9 Colby Richardson CB; 31 Markel Roby FS; 38 Donald Rutledge Jr. SS; 24 Kiondre Thomas CB; 21 Rashad Torrence II SS; Special teams: 45 Logan Klusman LS; 39 J. J. Molson K; 49 Hunter Niswander P	Reserve lists: 88 Woody Brandom TE (IR); 10 Reuben Foster LB (IR); 90 Toby Johnson DT (IR); 54 Carlo Kemp DE Retired; 99 Olive Sagapolu DT (IR); 55 Gabe Sewell LB (IR); 59 Reggie Walker DE (IR); 50 active, 7 inactive

== Staff ==
The 2024 coaching staff was announced on February 21, 2024.

Houston Roughnecks staff
Front office: General manager – Lionel Vital; Head coach Head coach – Curtis Johnson Offensive coaches: Special Teams/Running Backs – Garret Chachere; Offensive Line – Bob Connelly; Offensive Coordinator/Quarterbacks – Eric Price	Defensive coaches: Defensive Line – Kwahn Drake; Defensive Backs – Brett Maxie; Assistant Secondary – Zach Shagi; Defensive Coordinator/Linebackers – Chris Wilson; Team operations: Quality Control – Jordan Higgins
