= 2024 San Antonio Brahmas season =

American professional football season

- Owner: Alpha Acquico, LLC
- General manager: Marc Lillibridge
- Head coach: Wade Phillips
- Home stadium: Alamodome

Results
- Record: 7–3
- Conference place: 2nd in XFL Conference
- Playoffs: Won Conference Finals (at Battlehawks) 25–15; Lost UFL Championship (vs. Stallions) 0–25

Uniform

The 2024 San Antonio Brahmas season was the second season for the San Antonio Brahmas as a professional American football franchise. They were members of the United Football League after a merger between the XFL and the USFL in the offseason. They were one of eight teams to compete in the league for the 2024 season. The Brahmas played their home games at the Alamodome and were led by head coach Wade Phillips.

== Transactions ==
=== XFL dispersal draft ===
Player	Position	Previous team
Brycen Alleyne	RB	Houston Roughnecks
Dieuly Aristilde	WR	Houston Roughnecks
Tavante Beckett	LB	Houston Roughnecks
Omari Cobb	LB	Houston Roughnecks
Rashaad Coward	T	Houston Roughnecks
Jalen Dalton	DT	Seattle Sea Dragons
Austin Edwards	DT	Houston Roughnecks
Cody Latimer	TE	Orlando Guardians
Alex Mollette	C	Houston Roughnecks
Jordan Mosley	DB	Houston Roughnecks
Marvin Pierre	LB	Houston Roughnecks
Wyatt Ray	DE	Houston Roughnecks
Jaylen Samuels	RB	Houston Roughnecks
Justin Smith	WR	Houston Roughnecks
Teez Tabor	DB	Houston Roughnecks
Kevin Toliver	DB	Houston Roughnecks
Taron Vincent	DT	Houston Roughnecks
Kade Warner	WR	Houston Roughnecks
Nate Wieland	LB	Houston Roughnecks
Quincy Wilson	DB	Houston Roughnecks

=== UFL Super Draft ===
Rnd.	Pick #	UFL team	Player	Pos.	Prev. team	Notes
1	1	San Antonio Brahmas	Quinten Dormady	QB	Orlando Guardians	
2	9	San Antonio Brahmas	Trey Botts	DT	Philadelphia Stars	
3	17	San Antonio Brahmas	B.J. Wilson	T	Houston Roughnecks	
4	25	San Antonio Brahmas	Chris Steele	DB	Houston Roughnecks	
5	33	San Antonio Brahmas	Dareuan Parker	T	Houston Roughnecks	
6	41	San Antonio Brahmas	K.D. Cannon	WR	Orlando Guardians	
7	49	San Antonio Brahmas	Landen Akers	WR	San Antonio Brahmas	
8	57	San Antonio Brahmas	A. J. Hendy	S	Houston Roughnecks	
9	65	San Antonio Brahmas	John Yarbrough	T	Houston Roughnecks	
10	73	San Antonio Brahmas	Cody Chrest	WR	Houston Roughnecks	

== Signees to the NFL ==
Player	Position	Date	NFL team	Ref.
Jacques Patrick	RB	May 15	Denver Broncos	
Luq Barcoo	CB	May 15	Pittsburgh Steelers	
John Parker Romo	K	May 15	Detroit Lions	
Alize Mack	TE	May 17	Tennessee Titans	
Kobe Smith	DE	June 16	New York Giants	
Rex Sunahara	LS	June 19	Pittsburgh Steelers	

== Schedule ==
All times Central

Week	Day	Date	Kickoff	TV	Opponent	Results		Location	Attendance
Week	Day	Date	Kickoff	TV	Opponent	Score	Record	Location	Attendance
1	Sunday	March 31	11:00 a.m.	ESPN	DC Defenders	27–12	1–0	Alamodome	13,164
2	Saturday	April 6	11:00 a.m.	ESPN	at Memphis Showboats	20–19	2–0	Simmons Bank Liberty Stadium	8,791
3	Sunday	April 14	2:00 p.m.	ABC	St. Louis Battlehawks	24–31	2–1	Alamodome	11,790
4	Saturday	April 20	6:00 p.m.	Fox	Michigan Panthers	19–9	3–1	Alamodome	11,251
5	Saturday	April 27	6:00 p.m.	Fox	at Arlington Renegades	25–15	4–1	Choctaw Stadium	10,283
6	Sunday	May 5	3:00 p.m.	Fox	at DC Defenders	12–18	4–2	Audi Field	14,303
7	Sunday	May 12	2:00 p.m.	ESPN	at Houston Roughnecks	15–12	5–2	Rice Stadium	6,134
8	Sunday	May 19	3:00 p.m.	Fox	Arlington Renegades	20–15	6–2	Alamodome	11,395
9	Saturday	May 25	2:00 p.m.	ABC	Birmingham Stallions	18–9	7–2	Alamodome	11,839
10	Saturday	June 1	3:00 p.m.	Fox	at St. Louis Battlehawks	12–13	7–3	The Dome at America's Center	34,379

== Game summaries ==
=== Week 1: vs. DC Defenders ===
Week 1: DC Defenders at San Antonio Brahmas – Game summary

Quarter	1	2	3	4	Total
Defenders	3	6	3	0	12
Brahmas	7	13	0	7	27

at Alamodome, San Antonio, Texas

- Date: March 31
- Game time: 11:00 a.m. CDT
- Game weather: None (Indoor stadium)
- Game attendance: 13,164
- Referee: Bryan Banks
- TV announcers (ESPN): Mike Monaco, Sam Acho, Cole Cubelic and Stormy Buonantony
- Recap, Game Book

Game information

First quarter

- SA – Anthony McFarland Jr. 28-yard pass from Chase Garbers (John Lovett one-point run), 9:08. Brahmas 7–0. Drive: 11 plays, 60 yards, 5:52.
- DC – Matt McCrane 50-yard field goal, 0:22. Brahmas 7–3. Drive: 7 plays, 19 yards, 3:06.

Second quarter

- SA – Jontre Kirklin 4-yard pass from Chase Garbers (Chase Garbers-Justin Smith one-point pass), 11:21. Brahmas 14–3. Drive: 8 plays, 54 yards, 4:01.
- DC – Matt McCrane 34-yard field goal, 6:16. Brahmas 14–6. Drive: 9 plays, 42 yards, 5:05.
- DC – Matt McCrane 48-yard field goal, 2:00. Brahmas 14–9. Drive: 6 plays, 11 yards, 3:23.
- SA – Alex Mollette 40-yard pass from Brad Wing (two-point pass failed), 0:03. Brahmas 20–9. Drive: 7 plays, 70 yards, 1:57.

Third quarter

- DC – Matt McCrane 28-yard field goal, 2:54. Brahmas 20–12. Drive: 10 plays, 47 yards, 5:39.

Fourth quarter

- SA – Chase Garbers 5-yard run (John Lovett one-point run), 7:16. Brahmas 27–12. Drive: 3 plays, 6 yards, 1:29.

Top passers

- DC – Jordan Ta'amu – 25/45, 235 yards, INT
- SA – Chase Garbers – 19/25, 158 yards, 2 TD

Top rushers

- DC – Cam'Ron Harris – 8 rushes, 21 yards
- SA – Anthony McFarland Jr. – 9 rushes, 47 yards

Top receivers

- DC – Ty Scott – 4 receptions, 87 yards
- SA – Jontre Kirklin – 8 receptions, 61 yards, TD

=== Week 2: at Memphis Showboats ===
Week 2: San Antonio Brahmas at Memphis Showboats – Game summary

Quarter	1	2	3	4	Total
Brahmas	0	0	0	20	20
Showboats	7	6	3	3	19

at Simmons Bank Liberty Stadium, Memphis, Tennessee

- Date: April 6
- Game time: 11:00 a.m. CDT
- Game weather: Partly cloudy, 51 °F (11 °C)
- Game attendance: 8,791
- Referee: Stewart Mullins
- TV announcers (ESPN): Roy Philpott, Kirk Morrison, Eric MacLain and Ian Fitzsimmons
- Game Book

Game information

First quarter

- MEM – Daewood Davis 2-yard pass from Case Cookus (Case Cookus one-point run), 7:16. Showboats 7–0. Drive: 13 plays, 42 yards, 7:44.

Second quarter

- MEM – Matt Coughlin 23-yard field goal, 11:44. Showboats 10–0. Drive: 8 plays, 44 yards, 3:29.
- MEM – Matt Coughlin 35-yard field goal, 0:00. Showboats 13–0. Drive: 6 plays, 28 yards, 0:37.

Third quarter

- MEM – Matt Coughlin 22-yard field goal, 0:58. Showboats 16–0. Drive: 8 plays, 65 yards, 4:49.

Fourth quarter

- SA – Marquez Stevenson 10-yard pass from Chase Garbers (Chase Garbers-John Lovett two-point pass), 9:08. Showboats 16–8. Drive: 4 plays, 59 yards, 1:36.
- MEM – Matt Coughlin 22-yard field goal, 8:24. Showboats 19–8. Drive: 10 plays, 40 yards, 5:58.
- SA – Jontre Kirklin 5-yard pass from Chase Garbers (three-point pass failed), 0:48. Showboats 19–14. Drive: 8 plays, 72 yards, 1:47.
- SA – Cody Latimer 10-yard pass from Chase Garbers (two-point pass failed), 0:03. Brahmas 20–19. Drive: 9 plays, 64 yards, 0:48.

Top passers

- SA – Chase Garbers – 29/40, 287 yards, 3 TD, INT
- MEM – Case Cookus – 17/31, 194 yards, TD

Top rushers

- SA – Chase Garbers – 3 rushes, 20 yards
- MEM – Case Cookus – 9 rushes, 58 yards

Top receivers

- SA – Marquez Stevenson – 6 receptions, 103 yards, TD
- MEM – Jonathan Adams – 3 receptions, 76 yards

== Standings ==
2024 UFL standings
USFL Conference
Team	W	L	PCT	GB	TD+/-	TD+	TD-	DIV	PF	PA	DIFF	STK
(y) Birmingham Stallions	9	1	.900	–	11	31	20	6–0	265	180	85	W1
(x) Michigan Panthers	7	3	.700	2	5	27	22	4–2	228	189	39	L1
(e) Memphis Showboats	2	8	.200	7	-19	20	39	2–4	188	290	-102	W1
(e) Houston Roughnecks	1	9	.100	8	-12	17	29	0–6	158	233	-75	L6
XFL Conference
Team	W	L	PCT	GB	TD+/-	TD+	TD-	DIV	PF	PA	DIFF	STK
(y) St. Louis Battlehawks	7	3	.700	–	7	31	24	5–1	260	202	58	W1
(x) San Antonio Brahmas	7	3	.700	–	12	24	12	3–3	192	153	39	L1
(e) DC Defenders	4	6	.400	3	-2	24	26	2–4	209	251	-42	L1
(e) Arlington Renegades	3	7	.300	4	-2	26	28	2–4	247	249	-2	W2
(x)–clinched playoff berth; (y)–clinched division; (e)–eliminated from playoff contention

== Postseason ==
=== Schedule ===
Week	Day	Date	Kickoff	TV	Opponent	Results		Location	Attendance
Week	Day	Date	Kickoff	TV	Opponent	Score	Record	Location	Attendance
XFL Conference Championship	Sunday	June 9	6:00 p.m.	Fox	at St. Louis Battlehawks	25–15	1–0	The Dome at America's Center	30,237
UFL Championship	Sunday	June 16	4:00 p.m.	Fox	vs. Birmingham Stallions	0–25	1–1	The Dome at America's Center	27,396

== Roster ==
2024 San Antonio Brahmas final roster
Quarterbacks: 12 Quinten Dormady; 14 Chase Garbers; 19 Kevin Hogan; Running backs: 27 Morgan Ellison; 7 John Lovett; 41 Anthony McFarland Jr.; 17 Pooka Williams; Wide receivers: 16 K. D. Cannon; 13 Jontre Kirklin; 80 Tavonn Salter; 10 Justin Smith; 5 Marquez Stevenson; 84 Calvin Turner; 81 Kade Warner	Offensive linemen: 69 Rashaad Coward G; 50 Julién Davenport T; 75 Greg Eiland T; 77 Chuck Filiaga T; 66 Kohl Levao G; 55 Alex Mollette C; 67 Aaron Monteiro G/T; 71 Sam Tecklenburg C; Defensive linemen: 53 Trevon Coley DT; 98 Prince Emili DT; 44 Zach Morton DE; 91 Garrett Nelson DE; 99 Caeveon Patton DT; 9 Wyatt Ray DE; 45 Delontae Scott DE; 93 Jacob Sykes DE; 92 Jaylen Twyman DT; 8 Tim Ward DE	Linebackers: 51 Kelechi Anyalebechi; 40 Robert Barnes; 11 Tavante Beckett; 52 Joel Iyiegbuniwe; 15 Jordan Williams; Defensive backs: 29 A. J. Hendy SS; 32 BoPete Keyes CB; 6 Derrick Langford CB; 28 Corey Mayfield Jr. CB; 23 Jordan Mosley FS; 21 Scott Nelson FS; 2 Darius Phillips CB; 22 Teez Tabor SS; 1 Bryce Thompson CB; Special teams: 18 Ryan Santoso K; 47 Rex Sunahara LS; 4 Brad Wing P	Reserve lists: 82 Landen Akers WR (Susp.); 94 Jalen Dalton DT (IR); -- Cameron Dantzler CB (Susp.); 19 Donald De La Haye K (IR); 3 Cody Latimer TE (IR); 53 Zach McCloud LB (IR); 97 Tariqious Tisdale DT Retired; 95 Taron Vincent DT (IR); 31 Nate Wieland LB (IR); -- Quincy Wilson CB (IR); 50 active, 10 inactive

== Staff ==
The 2024 coaching staff was announced on February 21, 2024.

San Antonio Brahmas staff
Front office: General manager – Marc Lillibridge; Head coach Head coach – Wade Phillips Offensive coaches: Offensive Line – Andre Gurode; Wide Receivers/Special Teams – Payton Pardee; Offensive Coordinator – A. J. Smith; Running Backs – Marvin Williams Jr.	Defensive coaches: Defensive Line – Chris Achuff; Linebackers – Derrick Berry; Defensive Coordinator – Will Reed
