= 2024 DC Defenders season =

American professional football season

- Owner: Alpha Acquico, LLC
- General manager: Von Hutchins
- Head coach: Reggie Barlow
- Home stadium: Audi Field

Results
- Record: 4–6
- Conference place: 3rd in XFL Conference
- Playoffs: Did not qualify

Uniform

The 2024 DC Defenders season was the third season for the DC Defenders as a professional American football franchise and their first as a member of the United Football League (UFL). The Defenders played their home games at Audi Field and were led by head coach Reggie Barlow.

Following an upset loss to the Arlington Renegades in the 2023 XFL Championship, the franchise looked to return the playoffs. However, despite a 2–1 start, the team would be troubled with injuries to key players and poor defensive play, resulting in them going on a poor 3–3 start by Week 6 in which they would never recover as they were officially eliminated from playoff contention following a Week 8 loss to the St. Louis Battlehawks.

== Signees to the NFL ==
Player	Position	Date	NFL team	Ref.
Daniel Whelan	P	May 17	Green Bay Packers	
Ferrod Gardner	LB	May 22	Washington Commanders	
Lucky Jackson	WR	May 23	Minnesota Vikings	
Brandon Smith	WR	June 12	Arizona Cardinals	
Chris Blair	WR	June 16	Atlanta Falcons	
Liam Fornadel	OG	June 18	New England Patriots	

== Schedule ==
All times Eastern

Week	Day	Date	Kickoff	TV	Opponent	Results		Location	Attendance
Week	Day	Date	Kickoff	TV	Opponent	Score	Record	Location	Attendance
1	Sunday	March 31	12:00 p.m.	ESPN	at San Antonio Brahmas	L 12–27	0–1	Alamodome	13,164
2	Sunday	April 7	4:00 p.m.	Fox	Houston Roughnecks	W 23–18	1–1	Audi Field	15,052
3	Saturday	April 13	1:00 p.m.	ESPN	at Arlington Renegades	W 29–28	2–1	Choctaw Stadium	8,411
4	Saturday	April 20	7:00 p.m.	Fox	at Birmingham Stallions	L 18–20	2–2	Protective Stadium	7,262
5	Sunday	April 28	12:00 p.m.	ESPN	St. Louis Battlehawks	L 12–45	2–3	Audi Field	16,058
6	Sunday	May 5	4:00 p.m.	Fox	San Antonio Brahmas	W 18–12	3–3	Audi Field	14,303
7	Sunday	May 12	12:00 p.m.	ESPN	Michigan Panthers	L 9–22	3–4	Audi Field	12,222
8	Sunday	May 19	12:00 p.m.	ABC	at St. Louis Battlehawks	L 21–26	3–5	The Dome at America's Center	32,403
9	Sunday	May 26	2:30 p.m.	Fox	at Memphis Showboats	W 36–21	4–5	Simmons Bank Liberty Stadium	6,387
10	Sunday	June 2	12:00 p.m.	ABC	Arlington Renegades	L 31–32	4–6	Audi Field	13,080

== Game summaries ==
=== Week 1: at San Antonio Brahmas ===
Week 1: DC Defenders at San Antonio Brahmas – Game summary

Quarter	1	2	3	4	Total
Defenders	3	6	3	0	12
Brahmas	7	13	0	7	27

at Alamodome, San Antonio, Texas

- Date: March 31
- Game time: 12:00 p.m. EDT/11:00 a.m. CDT
- Game weather: None (Indoor stadium)
- Game attendance: 13,164
- Referee: Bryan Banks
- TV announcers (ESPN): Mike Monaco, Sam Acho, Cole Cubelic and Stormy Buonantony
- Recap, Game Book

Game information

First quarter

- SA – Anthony McFarland Jr. 28-yard pass from Chase Garbers (John Lovett one-point run), 9:08. Brahmas 7–0. Drive: 11 plays, 60 yards, 5:52.
- DC – Matt McCrane 50-yard field goal, 0:22. Brahmas 7–3. Drive: 7 plays, 19 yards, 3:06.

Second quarter

- SA – Jontre Kirklin 4-yard pass from Chase Garbers (Chase Garbers-Justin Smith one-point pass), 11:21. Brahmas 14–3. Drive: 8 plays, 54 yards, 4:01.
- DC – Matt McCrane 34-yard field goal, 6:16. Brahmas 14–6. Drive: 9 plays, 42 yards, 5:05.
- DC – Matt McCrane 48-yard field goal, 2:00. Brahmas 14–9. Drive: 6 plays, 11 yards, 3:23.
- SA – Alex Mollette 40-yard pass from Brad Wing (two-point pass failed), 0:03. Brahmas 20–9. Drive: 7 plays, 70 yards, 1:57.

Third quarter

- DC – Matt McCrane 28-yard field goal, 2:54. Brahmas 20–12. Drive: 10 plays, 47 yards, 5:39.

Fourth quarter

- SA – Chase Garbers 5-yard run (John Lovett one-point run), 7:16. Brahmas 27–12. Drive: 3 plays, 6 yards, 1:29.

Top passers

- DC – Jordan Ta'amu – 25/45, 235 yards, INT
- SA – Chase Garbers – 19/25, 158 yards, 2 TD

Top rushers

- DC – Cam'Ron Harris – 8 rushes, 21 yards
- SA – Anthony McFarland Jr. – 9 rushes, 47 yards

Top receivers

- DC – Ty Scott – 4 receptions, 87 yards
- SA – Jontre Kirklin – 8 receptions, 61 yards, TD

== Standings ==
2024 UFL standings
USFL Conference
Team	W	L	PCT	GB	TD+/-	TD+	TD-	DIV	PF	PA	DIFF	STK
(y) Birmingham Stallions	9	1	.900	–	11	31	20	6–0	265	180	85	W1
(x) Michigan Panthers	7	3	.700	2	5	27	22	4–2	228	189	39	L1
(e) Memphis Showboats	2	8	.200	7	-19	20	39	2–4	188	290	-102	W1
(e) Houston Roughnecks	1	9	.100	8	-12	17	29	0–6	158	233	-75	L6
XFL Conference
Team	W	L	PCT	GB	TD+/-	TD+	TD-	DIV	PF	PA	DIFF	STK
(y) St. Louis Battlehawks	7	3	.700	–	7	31	24	5–1	260	202	58	W1
(x) San Antonio Brahmas	7	3	.700	–	12	24	12	3–3	192	153	39	L1
(e) DC Defenders	4	6	.400	3	-2	24	26	2–4	209	251	-42	L1
(e) Arlington Renegades	3	7	.300	4	-2	26	28	2–4	247	249	-2	W2
(x)–clinched playoff berth; (y)–clinched division; (e)–eliminated from playoff contention

== Roster ==
2024 DC Defenders final roster
Quarterbacks: 11 Mike DiLiello; 17 Jalan McClendon; 10 Jordan Ta'amu; Running backs: 28 Darius Hagans; 3 Cam'Ron Harris; Wide receivers: 81 Keke Coutee; 12 Chris Rowland; 19 Ty Scott; 2 Brandon Smith; 86 Vyncint Smith; 82 Monroe Young; Tight ends: 87 Ben Bresnahan; 18 Alex Ellis; 88 Briley Moore; 89 Kaden Smith	Offensive linemen: 59 William Barnes T; 70 Yasir Durant G/T; 77 Liam Fornadel G; 51 Mike Maietti C; 76 Greg Long T; 56 David Satkowski G; 62 Jarrid Williams T; 68 John Yarbrough G; Defensive linemen: 97 Kevin Atkins DT; 72 T. J. Barnes DT; 7 Davin Bellamy DE; 92 Malik Fisher DE; 33 Trent Harris DE; 91 Dennis Johnson DT; 48 Andre Mintze DE; 50 Derick Roberson DE; 90 Niles Scott DT	Linebackers: 6 Ferrod Gardner; 57 Anthony Hines; 49 Mikel Jones; 5 Reggie Northrup; 55 MoMo Sanogo; Defensive backs: 9 Deontay Anderson SS; 25 Deandre Baker CB; 1 Kentrell Brice FS; 20 Gareon Conley CB; 33 Isaiah Johnson CB; 15 Michael Joseph CB; 24 Anthoula Kelly CB; 21 Montae Nicholson FS; 39 Santos Ramirez SS; 38 Nydair Rouse CB; Special teams: 80 Trae Barry LS; 47 Paxton Brooks P/K; 16 Matt McCrane K	Reserve lists: 82 Shaun Beyer TE (IR); 43 Francis Bernard LB (Susp.); 73 Tommy Champion T (IR); 8 Deondre Francois QB (IR); 53 Lamont Gaillard G/C (IR); -- Josh Hammond WR Retired; 13 Kelvin Harmon WR (IR); 26 DeJuan Neal CB (Susp.); 37 Sam Kidd SS (IR); 4 Abram Smith RB (IR); 99 Joseph Wallace NT (IR); 50 active, 10 inactive

== Staff ==
The 2024 coaching staff was announced on February 21, 2024.

DC Defenders staff
Front office: General manager – Von Hutchins; Head coach Head coach – Reggie Barlow Offensive coaches: Offensive Coordinator – Fred Kaiss; Wide Receivers – Sean Anderson; Offensive Line – Sean Kugler; Quarterbacks – Shannon Harris	Defensive coaches: Defensive Backs – Vern Dean; Linebackers – Deion Harris; Defensive Line – Jeremy Watkins; Defensive Coordinator – Gregg Williams

Offensive Line coach Russ Ehrenfeld was replaced by Sean Kugler Week 6.
