= 2024 St. Louis Battlehawks season =

American professional football season

- Owner: Alpha Acquico, LLC
- General manager: Dave Boller
- Head coach: Anthony Becht
- Home stadium: The Dome at America's Center

Results
- Record: 7–3
- Conference place: 1st in XFL Conference
- Playoffs: Lost Conference Finals (vs. Brahmas) 15–25

Uniform

The 2024 St. Louis Battlehawks season was the third season for the St. Louis Battlehawks as a professional American football franchise. They played as members of the United Football League after a merger between the XFL and the USFL. They were one of eight teams vying to compete in the league for the 2024 season. The Battlehawks played their home games at The Dome at America's Center and were led by head coach Anthony Becht. The team competed in the XFL Conference.

The Battlehawks tied their 7–3 record from the previous season. Despite the above–record, they missed the playoffs last season. Following a Week 8 victory against the DC Defenders, the franchise officially clinched a playoff berth to the XFL Conference Championship Game.

== Signees to the NFL ==
Player	Position	Date	NFL team	Ref.
Lukas Denis	S	May 15	Atlanta Falcons	
LaCale London	DT	May 15	Atlanta Falcons	
Gary Jennings	WR	May 16	Carolina Panthers	
Jaryd Jones-Smith	OT	May 16	Washington Commanders	
Hakeem Butler	WR	May 16	Pittsburgh Steelers	
Marcell Ateman	WR	June 1	Buffalo Bills	
Darrius Shepherd	WR	June 1	Los Angeles Chargers	
Kevin Atkins	DT	July 26	New York Giants	

== Schedule ==
All times Central

Week	Day	Date	Kickoff	TV	Opponent	Results		Location	Attendance
Week	Day	Date	Kickoff	TV	Opponent	Score	Record	Location	Attendance
1	Saturday	March 30	3:00 p.m.	Fox	at Michigan Panthers	L 16–18	0–1	Ford Field	9,444
2	Saturday	April 6	7:00 p.m.	ABC	Arlington Renegades	W 27–24	1–1	The Dome at America's Center	40,317
3	Sunday	April 14	2:00 p.m.	ABC	at San Antonio Brahmas	W 31–24	2–1	Alamodome	11,790
4	Saturday	April 20	11:30 a.m.	ABC	Memphis Showboats	W 32–17	3–1	The Dome at America's Center	31,757
5	Sunday	April 28	11:00 a.m.	ESPN	at DC Defenders	W 45–12	4–1	Audi Field	16,058
6	Saturday	May 4	2:00 p.m.	Fox	Houston Roughnecks	W 22–8	5–1	The Dome at America's Center	32,969
7	Saturday	May 11	3:00 p.m.	Fox	at Birmingham Stallions	L 26–30	5–2	Protective Stadium	14,056
8	Sunday	May 19	11:00 a.m.	ABC	DC Defenders	W 26–21	6–2	The Dome at America's Center	32,403
9	Saturday	May 25	11:00 a.m.	ABC	at Arlington Renegades	L 22–36	6–3	Choctaw Stadium	8,545
10	Saturday	June 1	3:00 p.m.	Fox	San Antonio Brahmas	W 13–12	7–3	The Dome at America's Center	34,379

== Game summaries ==
=== Week 1: at Michigan Panthers ===
Week 1: St. Louis Battlehawks at Michigan Panthers – Game summary

Quarter	1	2	3	4	Total
Battlehawks	0	3	0	13	16
Panthers	0	0	7	11	18

at Ford Field, Detroit, Michigan

- Date: March 30
- Game time: 3:00 p.m. CDT/4:00 p.m. EDT
- Game weather: None (Indoor stadium)
- Game attendance: 9,444
- Referee: Adam Savoie
- TV announcers (Fox): Kevin Kugler, Devin Gardner and Jake Butt
- Recap, Game Book

Game information

First quarter

- No scoring plays

Second quarter

- STL – Andre Szmyt 36-yard field goal, 0:00. Battlehawks 3–0. Drive: 16 plays, 87 yards, 7:51.

Third quarter

- MICH – E. J. Perry 4-yard run (Matt Colburn one-point run), 5:26. Panthers 7–3. Drive: 8 plays, 93 yards, 5:03.

Fourth quarter

- STL – Jake Sutherland 5-yard pass from A. J. McCarron (two-point pass failed), 7:55. Battlehawks 9–7. Drive: 6 plays, 29 yards, 2:47.
- MICH – E. J. Perry 8-yard run (E. J. Perry-Devin Ross two-point pass), 5:01. Panthers 15–9. Drive: 5 plays, 56 yards, 2:54.
- STL – Marcell Ateman 5-yard pass from A. J. McCarron (A. J. McCarron-Jake Sutherland one-point pass), 7:55. Battlehawks 16–15. Drive: 11 plays, 44 yards, 4:12.
- MICH – Jake Bates 64-yard field goal, 0:03. Panthers 18–16. Drive: 8 plays, 19 yards, 0:46.

Top passers

- STL – A. J. McCarron – 24/37, 216 yards, 2 TD
- MICH – E. J. Perry – 12/24, 176 yards, 2 INT

Top rushers

- STL – Wayne Gallman – 13 rushes, 40 yards
- MICH – Wes Hills – 11 rushes, 85 yards

Top receivers

- STL – Marcell Ateman – 6 receptions, 60 yards, TD
- MICH – Devin Ross – 2 receptions, 46 yards

== Standings ==
2024 UFL standings
USFL Conference
Team	W	L	PCT	GB	TD+/-	TD+	TD-	DIV	PF	PA	DIFF	STK
(y) Birmingham Stallions	9	1	.900	–	11	31	20	6–0	265	180	85	W1
(x) Michigan Panthers	7	3	.700	2	5	27	22	4–2	228	189	39	L1
(e) Memphis Showboats	2	8	.200	7	-19	20	39	2–4	188	290	-102	W1
(e) Houston Roughnecks	1	9	.100	8	-12	17	29	0–6	158	233	-75	L6
XFL Conference
Team	W	L	PCT	GB	TD+/-	TD+	TD-	DIV	PF	PA	DIFF	STK
(y) St. Louis Battlehawks	7	3	.700	–	7	31	24	5–1	260	202	58	W1
(x) San Antonio Brahmas	7	3	.700	–	12	24	12	3–3	192	153	39	L1
(e) DC Defenders	4	6	.400	3	-2	24	26	2–4	209	251	-42	L1
(e) Arlington Renegades	3	7	.300	4	-2	26	28	2–4	247	249	-2	W2
(x)–clinched playoff berth; (y)–clinched division; (e)–eliminated from playoff contention

== Postseason ==
=== Schedule ===
Week	Day	Date	Kickoff	TV	Opponent	Results		Location	Attendance
Week	Day	Date	Kickoff	TV	Opponent	Score	Record	Location	Attendance
XFL Conference Championship	Sunday	June 9	6:00 p.m.	Fox	vs. San Antonio Brahmas	L 15–25	0–1	The Dome at America's Center	30,237

== Roster ==
2024 St. Louis Battlehawks final roster
Quarterbacks: 10 A. J. McCarron; 12 Brandon Silvers; 5 Manny Wilkins; Running backs: 30 Wayne Gallman; 25 Kevon Latulas; 15 Jacob Saylors; Wide receivers: 3 Marcell Ateman; 88 Hakeem Butler; 8 Blake Jackson; 85 Jerome Kapp; 22 Steven Mitchell; 1 Jahcour Pearson; 11 Darrius Shepherd; 13 Jeff Thomas; Tight ends: 80 Kemari Averett; 84 Jake Sutherland	Offensive linemen: 78 Vadal Alexander G; 62 Abdul Beecham G; 73 Juwann Bushell-Beatty T; 74 Steven Gonzalez G; 75 Jaryd Jones-Smith T; 77 Eric Magwood T; 61 Mike Panasiuk C; 50 Teton Saltes T; 54 Dohnovan West C/G; Defensive linemen: 98 Freedom Akinmoladun DE; 99 Austin Faoliu DT; 52 Antwuan Jackson DE; 93 T. J. Pesefea DT; 96 Kobe Smith DE	Linebackers: 56 Travis Feeney OLB; 48 Chris Garrett OLB; 51 Willie Harvey Jr. ILB; 33 Elijah Lee ILB; 27 Mike Rose ILB; 7 Pita Taumoepenu OLB; 26 Carson Wells OLB; Defensive backs: 29 Dravon Askew-Henry SS; 20 Nico Bolden FS; 32 Qwynnterrio Cole SS; 28 Ben DeLuca FS; 31 Mike Hampton CB; 4 Tim Harris CB; 24 Lavert Hill CB; 23 Kameron Kelly FS; 9 Chris Payton-Jones CB; Special teams: 16 Sterling Hofrichter P/K; 47 Alex Matheson LS; 19 Andre Szmyt K	Reserve lists: 18 Ja'Marcus Bradley WR (IR); -- Johnny Buchanan ILB (IR); 21 Mataeo Durant RB (IR); 33 Drew Lewis ILB (IR); 59 Callahan O'Reilly ILB (IR); 38 Brandon Sebastian CB (IR); 6 Lakiem Williams OLB (IR); 49 active, 7 inactive

== Staff ==
The 2024 coaching staff was announced on February 21, 2024.

St. Louis Batthawks staff
Front office: General manager – Dave Boller; Head coach Head coach – Anthony Becht Offensive coaches: Running Backs/Special Teams – Kyle Caskey; Offensive Coordinator – Bruce Gradkowski; Offensive Line – Gino Gradkowski; Wide Receivers – Phil McGeoghan	Defensive coaches: Defensive Coordinator – Donnie Abraham; Secondary – Martin Bayless; Linebackers – Chris Claiborne; Defensive Line – La'Roi Glover
