= 2024 Memphis Showboats season =

American professional football season

- General manager: Dennis Polian
- Head coach: John DeFilippo
- Home stadium: Simmons Bank Liberty Stadium

Results
- Record: 2–8
- Conference place: 3rd in USFL Conference
- Playoffs: Did not qualify

Uniform

The 2024 Memphis Showboats season was the second season for the Memphis Showboats as a professional American football franchise and their first as part of the United Football League. The Showboats played their home games at the Simmons Bank Liberty Stadium and were led by head coach John DeFilippo.

The Showboats failed to improve from their 5–5 record from the previous season. Head coach John DeFilippo and the general manager, both resigned after the season completed.

== Previous season ==
The Showboats finished the previous season with a 5–5 record. They would miss the USFL playoffs.

== Schedule ==
All times Central

Week	Day	Date	Kickoff	TV	Opponent	Results		Location	Attendance
Week	Day	Date	Kickoff	TV	Opponent	Score	Record	Location	Attendance
1	Sunday	March 31	2:00 p.m.	ESPN	at Houston Roughnecks	18–12	1–0	Rice Stadium	9,157
2	Saturday	April 6	11:00 a.m.	ESPN	San Antonio Brahmas	19–20	1–1	Simmons Bank Liberty Stadium	8,791
3	Saturday	April 13	6:00 p.m.	Fox	at Birmingham Stallions	14–33	1–2	Protective Stadium	12,265
4	Saturday	April 20	11:30 a.m.	ABC	at St. Louis Battlehawks	17–32	1–3	The Dome at America's Center	31,757
5	Sunday	April 28	2:00 p.m.	Fox	Michigan Panthers	18–35	1–4	Simmons Bank Liberty Stadium	7,640
6	Saturday	May 4	11:00 a.m.	ABC	Birmingham Stallions	21–39	1–5	Simmons Bank Liberty Stadium	5,609
7	Saturday	May 11	12:00 p.m.	ESPN	at Arlington Renegades	23–47	1–6	Choctaw Stadium	8,042
8	Saturday	May 18	3:00 p.m.	Fox	at Michigan Panthers	18–24	1–7	Ford Field	9,370
9	Sunday	May 26	1:30 p.m.	Fox	DC Defenders	21–36	1–8	Simmons Bank Liberty Stadium	6,387
10	Sunday	June 2	6:00 p.m.	Fox	Houston Roughnecks	19–12	2–8	Simmons Bank Liberty Stadium	6,039

== Game summaries ==
=== Week 1: at Houston Roughnecks ===
Week 1: Memphis Showboats at Houston Roughnecks – Game summary

Quarter	1	2	3	4	Total
Showboats	9	6	0	3	18
Roughnecks	0	3	0	9	12

at Rice Stadium, Houston, Texas

- Date: March 31
- Game time: 2:00 p.m. CDT
- Game weather: Haze, 79 °F (26 °C)
- Game attendance: 9,157
- Referee: Jeff Heaser
- TV announcers (ESPN): Lowell Galindo, Tom Luginbill, Harry Douglas and Kayla Burton
- Recap, Game Book

Game information

First quarter

- MEM – Matt Coghlin 27-yard field goal, 4:31. Showboats 3–0. Drive: 16 plays, 56 yards, 10:29.
- MEM – Christian McFarland 12-yard fumble return (one-point run failed), 3:42. Showboats 9–0.

Second quarter

- MEM – Vinny Papale 11-yard pass from Case Cookus (one-point pass failed), 6:57. Showboats 15–0. Drive: 11 plays, 74 yards, 7:57.
- HOU – J.J. Molson 55-yard field goal, 1:51. Showboats 15–3. Drive: 10 plays, 41 yards, 5:06.

Third quarter

- No scoring plays

Fourth quarter

- HOU – J.J. Molson 45-yard field goal, 13:46. Showboats 15–6. Drive: 7 plays, 63 yards, 3:12.
- MEM – Matt Coghlin 51-yard field goal, 8:44. Showboats 18–6. Drive: 9 plays, 20 yards, 5:02.
- HOU – Jarrett Guarantano 1-yard run (three-point pass failed), 5:29. Showboats 18–12. Drive: 3 plays, 17 yards, 1:09.

Top passers

- MEM – Case Cookus – 23/40, 204 yards, TD, INT
- HOU – Jarrett Guarantano – 16/21, 157 yards

Top rushers

- MEM – Case Cookus – 4 rushes, 16 yards
- HOU – Jarrett Guarantano – 2 rushes, 22 yards, TD

Top receivers

- MEM – Jonathan Adams – 4 receptions, 49 yards
- HOU – Kirk Merritt – 4 receptions, 33 yards

=== Week 2: vs. San Antonio Brahmas ===
Week 2: San Antonio Brahmas at Memphis Showboats – Game summary

Quarter	1	2	3	4	Total
Brahmas	0	0	0	20	20
Showboats	7	6	3	3	19

at Simmons Bank Liberty Stadium, Memphis, Tennessee

- Date: April 6
- Game time: 11:00 a.m. CDT
- Game weather: Partly cloudy, 51 °F (11 °C)
- Game attendance: 8,791
- Referee: Stewart Mullins
- TV announcers (ESPN): Roy Philpott, Kirk Morrison, Eric MacLain and Ian Fitzsimmons
- Game Book

Game information

First quarter

- MEM – Daewood Davis 2-yard pass from Case Cookus (Case Cookus one-point run), 7:16. Showboats 7–0. Drive: 13 plays, 42 yards, 7:44.

Second quarter

- MEM – Matt Coughlin 23-yard field goal, 11:44. Showboats 10–0. Drive: 8 plays, 44 yards, 3:29.
- MEM – Matt Coughlin 35-yard field goal, 0:00. Showboats 13–0. Drive: 6 plays, 28 yards, 0:37.

Third quarter

- MEM – Matt Coughlin 22-yard field goal, 0:58. Showboats 16–0. Drive: 8 plays, 65 yards, 4:49.

Fourth quarter

- SA – Marquez Stevenson 10-yard pass from Chase Garbers (Chase Garbers-John Lovett two-point pass), 9:08. Showboats 16–8. Drive: 4 plays, 59 yards, 1:36.
- MEM – Matt Coughlin 22-yard field goal, 8:24. Showboats 19–8. Drive: 10 plays, 40 yards, 5:58.
- SA – Jontre Kirklin 5-yard pass from Chase Garbers (three-point pass failed), 0:48. Showboats 19–14. Drive: 8 plays, 72 yards, 1:47.
- SA – Cody Latimer 10-yard pass from Chase Garbers (two-point pass failed), 0:03. Brahmas 20–19. Drive: 9 plays, 64 yards, 0:48.

Top passers

- SA – Chase Garbers – 29/40, 287 yards, 3 TD, INT
- MEM – Case Cookus – 17/31, 194 yards, TD

Top rushers

- SA – Chase Garbers – 3 rushes, 20 yards
- MEM – Case Cookus – 9 rushes, 58 yards

Top receivers

- SA – Marquez Stevenson – 6 receptions, 103 yards, TD
- MEM – Jonathan Adams – 3 receptions, 76 yards

== Standings ==
2024 UFL standings
USFL Conference
Team	W	L	PCT	GB	TD+/-	TD+	TD-	DIV	PF	PA	DIFF	STK
(y) Birmingham Stallions	9	1	.900	–	11	31	20	6–0	265	180	85	W1
(x) Michigan Panthers	7	3	.700	2	5	27	22	4–2	228	189	39	L1
(e) Memphis Showboats	2	8	.200	7	-19	20	39	2–4	188	290	-102	W1
(e) Houston Roughnecks	1	9	.100	8	-12	17	29	0–6	158	233	-75	L6
XFL Conference
Team	W	L	PCT	GB	TD+/-	TD+	TD-	DIV	PF	PA	DIFF	STK
(y) St. Louis Battlehawks	7	3	.700	–	7	31	24	5–1	260	202	58	W1
(x) San Antonio Brahmas	7	3	.700	–	12	24	12	3–3	192	153	39	L1
(e) DC Defenders	4	6	.400	3	-2	24	26	2–4	209	251	-42	L1
(e) Arlington Renegades	3	7	.300	4	-2	26	28	2–4	247	249	-2	W2
(x)–clinched playoff berth; (y)–clinched division; (e)–eliminated from playoff contention

== Roster ==
2024 Memphis Showboats final roster
Quarterbacks: 10 Case Cookus; 15 Josh Love; 11 Troy Williams; Running backs: 6 Cyrus Habibi-Likio; 8 Titus Swen; 27 Darius Victor; Wide receivers: 12 Jonathan Adams; 4 Dee Anderson; 2 Daewood Davis; 84 Lee Morris. Jr.; 16 Diondre Overton; 13 Vinny Papale; Tight ends: 17 Wes Saxton; 83 Sage Surratt; 88 Jay Jay Wilson	Offensive linemen: 77 Jarron Jones T; 72 Alec Lindstrom G; 51 Jordan McCray G/C; 76 Darrin Paulo G; 55 Terronne Prescod G; 64 Marcus Tatum T; 73 Jared Thomas C; 75 James Tunstall G/T; 62 Salesi Uhatafe G; Defensive linemen: 99 John Atkins DT; 91 Josiah Bronson DT; 97 Connor Christian DE; 90 Dillon Faamatau DE; 42 Jordan Ferguson DE; 92 P. J. Hall DT; 94 Daylon Mack DT	Linebackers: 50 Anthony Butler; 2 Vontae Diggs; 48 Terrill Hanks; 45 Malik Lawal; 5 T. J. Neal; 41 Greg Reaves; 52 Tyshun Render; 9 Max Roberts; Defensive backs: 21 Delrick Abrams CB; 1 D. J. Daniel CB; 24 Jarey Elder S; 14 T. J. Green S; 23 Lamont McPhatter II S; 7 Quenton Meeks CB; 32 Nehemiah Shelton CB; 28 Kyree Woods S; Special teams: 59 Turner Bernard LS; 49 Matt Coghlin K; 19 Matt White P	Reserve lists: 33 Jeff McCulloch LB (IR); -- Troy Warner S Retired; 50 active, 2 inactive

== Staff ==
The 2024 coaching staff was announced on February 21, 2024.

Memphis Showboats staff
Front office: General manager – Dennis Polian; Head coach Head coach – John DeFilippo Offensive coaches: Special Teams/Running Backs – Kirk Doll; Offensive Coordinator/Wide Receivers – Doug Martin; Run Game Coordinator/Offensive Line – Jim Turner; Tight Ends – T.J. Vernieri	Defensive coaches: Defensive Coordinator/Defensive Backs – Carnell Lake; Linebackers – Paul Pasqualoni; Assistant Linebackers – Steven Thompson
