= Mike Nolan =

American football coach (born 1959)

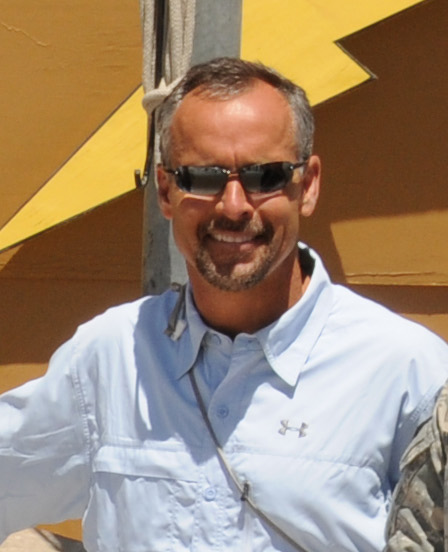
- Nolan in 2008

Personal information
- Born: March 7, 1959 (age 67); Baltimore, Maryland, U.S.

Career information
- High school: Woodside (Woodside, California)
- College: Oregon

Career history
- Oregon (1981) Graduate assistant; Stanford (1982–1983) Linebackers coach; Rice (1984) Defensive line coach; LSU (1985–1986) Linebackers coach; Denver Broncos (1987–1988) Special teams coach; Denver Broncos (1989–1992) Linebackers coach; New York Giants (1993–1996) Defensive coordinator; Washington Redskins (1997–1999) Defensive coordinator; New York Jets (2000) Defensive coordinator; Baltimore Ravens (2001) Wide receivers coach; Baltimore Ravens (2002–2004) Defensive coordinator; San Francisco 49ers (2005–2008) Head coach; Denver Broncos (2009) Defensive coordinator; Miami Dolphins (2010–2011) Defensive coordinator; Atlanta Falcons (2012–2014) Defensive coordinator; San Diego Chargers (2015) Linebackers coach; New Orleans Saints (2017–2019) Linebackers coach; Dallas Cowboys (2020) Defensive coordinator; Michigan Panthers (2023–2025) Head coach

Awards and highlights
- UFL: UFL Coach of the Year (2024)

Head coaching record
- Regular season: NFL 17–36 (.321); USFL/UFL 17–13 (.567)
- Postseason: USFL/UFL 1–3 (.250)
- Career: NFL 17–36 (.321); USFL/UFL 18–16 (.529)
- Coaching profile at Pro Football Reference

Michael Tullis Nolan (born March 7, 1959) is an American football coach. Nolan previously served as a head coach for the San Francisco 49ers, and a defensive coordinator for the National Football League (NFL)'s Baltimore Ravens, New York Jets, Washington Redskins, New York Giants, Denver Broncos, Miami Dolphins, Atlanta Falcons, and Dallas Cowboys. Nolan is a former linebackers coach for the Denver Broncos, San Diego Chargers, and New Orleans Saints.

== College years ==
Nolan attended the University of Oregon and was a three-year letterman in football and starter at safety.

== Coaching career ==
=== College ===
Nolan had coached at the collegiate level at Stanford University, Rice University, and LSU before moving on to the National Football League.

=== Denver Broncos ===
In 1987, Nolan was hired by the Denver Broncos as a special teams coach under head coach, Dan Reeves. In 1989, he was promoted to linebackers coach.

=== New York Giants ===
In 1993, Nolan followed Dan Reeves to the New York Giants and he was hired as defensive coordinator.

=== Washington Redskins ===
In 1997, Nolan was hired as defensive coordinator for the Washington Redskins.

=== New York Jets ===
In 2000, Nolan was hired by the New York Jets as their defensive coordinator under head coach Al Groh.

=== Baltimore Ravens ===
In 2001, Nolan was hired as wide receivers coach for the Baltimore Ravens. He was promoted to defensive coordinator in 2002.

=== San Francisco 49ers ===
In 2005, Nolan was hired as the head coach of the San Francisco 49ers, following in his father's footsteps, the former San Francisco 49ers and New Orleans Saints head coach, Dick Nolan. He also served as his own general manager.

Nolan and the 49ers selected Alex Smith with the first overall pick in the 2005 NFL draft. Nolan thought Smith to be cerebral, introspective, and non-confrontational. Nolan also evaluated Aaron Rodgers, but did not believe that Rodgers's attitude could co-exist with him. Nolan finished the 2005 season with a 4–12 record. The next season, Nolan led a late season run and the 49ers improved to 7–9. That led to expectations for the 2007 season which included at least 9 wins and a playoff appearance. The season started well at 2–0, but an 8-game losing streak ended all hope of a playoff run. During the season, he publicly disagreed with Smith over the severity of the quarterback's shoulder injury. Nolan had been under intense scrutiny in the Bay Area. After the season, Nolan lost his general manager position and on October 20, 2008, Nolan was fired and replaced by his assistant head coach Mike Singletary.

==== Suit issue ====
Following his hiring by the 49ers, Nolan asked the NFL for permission to wear a suit and tie on the sidelines as a tribute to his father. The league initially denied Nolan's request because of the contract it had with Reebok for its coaches to wear team-logo attire, a ruling that was changed during Nolan's second season as head coach. In the new NFL policy, coaches were allowed to wear a full suit for only two home games per season. The suits were designed, marketed and labeled under the Reebok corporation. Nolan debuted the suit in a game at home against the Seattle Seahawks on November 19, 2006. A day later, Jacksonville Jaguars head coach Jack Del Rio sported another Reebok suit on Monday Night Football.

After further lobbying by Nolan, the NFL and Reebok reached an agreement to allow suits to be worn at all home games in the 2007 season.

After his firing from the 49ers, however, he has simply worn team-issued apparel in all subsequent coaching jobs.

=== Denver Broncos (second stint) ===
In early 2009, Nolan was hired by the Denver Broncos as the defensive coordinator under head coach, Josh McDaniels. With a new 3-4 defense the Denver Broncos gave up the fewest points in the NFL (66) during the first six games of the season, and made their way to their first 6–0 start since the 1998 season in which they won Super Bowl XXXIII. The Broncos went 2–8 the rest of the way, and missed the playoffs. On January 18, 2010, Mike Nolan and Josh McDaniels mutually decided Nolan would resign as the defensive coordinator of the Denver Broncos.

=== Miami Dolphins ===
On January 19, 2010, Nolan was hired by the Miami Dolphins as defensive coordinator. In the 2010 season, the Dolphins finished 14th in points allowed per game (20.8), 6th in yards allowed per game (309.3) and 12th in Football Outsiders' DVOA. In the 2011 season, they finished 6th in points allowed per game (19.6), 15th in yards allowed per game (345.1) and 13th in Football Outsiders' DVOA.

=== Atlanta Falcons ===
On January 17, 2012, Nolan was hired by the Atlanta Falcons as defensive coordinator. In the 2012 season, the Falcons finished 5th in points allowed per game (18.7), 24th in yards allowed per game (365.6) and 9th in Football Outsiders' DVOA. In the 2013 season, they finished 27th in both points (27.7) and yards (379.4) allowed per game, and 26th in Football Outsiders' DVOA. In the 2014 season, Atlanta finished 27th in points allowed per game (26.1), 32nd in yards allowed per game (398.2) and 31st in Football Outsiders' DVOA.

=== San Diego Chargers ===
In 2015, Nolan was hired by the San Diego Chargers as their linebackers coach.

=== New Orleans Saints ===
In 2017, Nolan was hired by the New Orleans Saints as their linebackers coach.

=== Dallas Cowboys ===
On January 5, 2020, Nolan was hired by the Dallas Cowboys as their defensive coordinator. He reunited with head coach Mike McCarthy who was his offensive coordinator with the San Francisco 49ers. Nolan faced heavy restrictions due to the COVID-19 pandemic in terms of physical contact with the players, their availability due to a positive test for COVID-19 or having been exposed to someone who had it, a reduced training camp schedule and the cancellation of preseason games, which made it difficult to implement his defensive scheme. To make matters worse, most of the free agent signings for the defense were ineffective. The team would finish with a losing record (6-10), while the defensive unit allowed the most points in franchise history (473), finishing 31st in the league in run defense (158.8 YPG), 28th in scoring defense (29.6 PPG), 11th in pass defense (227.6 YPG), 20th in sacks (31) and allowed 69 plays of 20 yards or more. On January 8, 2021, the Cowboys fired Nolan, along with defensive line coach Jim Tomsula.

=== Michigan Panthers ===
On February 3, 2023, it was announced that Nolan was hired by the Michigan Panthers of United States Football League (USFL) to be their head coach, succeeding Jeff Fisher. This was Nolan's first head coaching job since 2008 with the 49ers.

==== 2023 ====
In Nolan's first season with the Panthers, he guided them to a 4–6 record, improving on last season where they went 2–8. Despite the mediocre record, the Panthers reached the playoffs, and faced the Pittsburgh Maulers in the USFL North Championship Game where they lost 31–27 in overtime.

==== 2024 ====
Due to the Panthers surviving the USFL and XFL's merger into the UFL, Nolan kept his job as head coach. The Panthers improved from last season, and finished with a 7–3 record, which was 2nd in the USFL conference. Nolan also won the UFL's Coach of the Year award. Unfortunately for Nolan, the Panthers lost to the Birmingham Stallions in the USFL Conference Championship Game 31–18 after leading 18–3 at halftime.

==== 2025 ====
The Panthers finished the season with a 6–4 record, failing to improve from last season, but for the first time ever, the Panthers defeated the Birmingham Stallions in the USFL Conference Championship Game 44–29 which was Nolan's first career playoff win. Unfortunately for Nolan, the Panthers lost to the DC Defenders in the UFL Championship 58–34.

After the season ended, the Panthers’ franchise folded, and Nolan was not hired by any of the other UFL teams.

== Head coaching record ==
=== NFL ===
Team	Year	Regular season					Postseason			
Team	Year	Won	Lost	Ties	Win %	Finish	Won	Lost	Win %	Result
SF	2005	4	12	0	.250	4th in NFC West	—	—	—	—
SF	2006	7	9	0	.438	3rd in NFC West	—	—	—	—
SF	2007	5	11	0	.313	3rd in NFC West	—	—	—	—
SF	2008	2	5	0	.286	Fired	—	—	—	—
SF Total		18	37	0	.327		0	0	.000	
Total		18	37	0	.327		0	0	.000	

=== USFL/UFL ===
League	Team	Year	Regular season					Postseason			
League	Team	Year	Won	Lost	Ties	Win %	Finish	Won	Lost	Win %	Result
USFL	MICH	2023	4	6	0	.400	2nd in USFL North	0	1	.000	Lost to Pittsburgh Maulers in North Division Championship Game
UFL	MICH	2024	7	3	0	.700	2nd in USFL Conference	0	1	.000	Lost to Birmingham Stallions in USFL Conference Championship Game
UFL	MICH	2025	6	4	0	.600	2nd in USFL Conference	1	1	.500	Lost to DC Defenders in UFL Championship Game
Total			17	13	0	.567		1	3	.250	

== Personal life ==
Nolan is married to his wife, Kathy, and has four children, Michael, Laura, Jennifer and Christopher.

Nolan attended Bellarmine College Preparatory in San Jose, California and Woodside High School, the alma mater of Julian Edelman.

Nolan's father, former 49ers and Saints coach Dick Nolan, died at age 75 on November 11, 2007, just a day before Mike's 49ers were to take on the Seattle Seahawks. Nolan decided to coach the Monday Night Football game in honor of his dad. The 49ers lost the game 24–0.
