= 2024 Michigan Panthers season =

American professional football season

- General manager: Steve Kazor
- Head coach: Mike Nolan
- Home stadium: Ford Field

Results
- Record: 7–3
- Conference place: 2nd in USFL Conference
- Playoffs: Lost Conference Finals (at Stallions) 18–31

Uniform

The 2024 Michigan Panthers season was the third season for the Michigan Panthers as a professional American football franchise and their first as part of the United Football League. The Panthers played their home games at the Ford Field and were led by head coach Mike Nolan.

With a 22–9 victory over the DC Defenders in Week 7, the Panthers surpassed their win total from last season with five wins.

== Previous season ==
The Panthers finished the previous season with a 4–6 record. They would make the USFL playoffs, where they were eliminated by the Pittsburgh Maulers in the North Division finals.

== Schedule ==
All times Eastern

| Week | Day | Date | Kickoff | TV | Opponent | Results | | Location | Attendance |
| Week | Day | Date | Kickoff | TV | Opponent | Score | Record | Location | Attendance |
|---|---|---|---|---|---|---|---|---|---|
| 1 | Saturday | March 30 | 4:00 p.m. | Fox | St. Louis Battlehawks | 18–16 | 1–0 | Ford Field | 9,444 |
| 2 | Sunday | April 7 | 12:00 p.m. | ESPN | Birmingham Stallions | 13–20 | 1–1 | Ford Field | 7,475 |
| 3 | Sunday | April 14 | 12:00 p.m. | ABC | Houston Roughnecks | 34–20 | 2–1 | Ford Field | 6,952 |
| 4 | Saturday | April 20 | 7:00 p.m. | Fox | at San Antonio Brahmas | 9–19 | 2–2 | Alamodome | 11,251 |
| 5 | Sunday | April 28 | 3:00 p.m. | Fox | at Memphis Showboats | 35–18 | 3–2 | Simmons Bank Liberty Stadium | 7,640 |
| 6 | Sunday | May 5 | 1:00 p.m. | Fox | Arlington Renegades | 28–27 | 4–2 | Ford Field | 7,428 |
| 7 | Sunday | May 12 | 12:00 p.m. | ESPN | at DC Defenders | 22–9 | 5–2 | Audi Field | 12,222 |
| 8 | Saturday | May 18 | 4:00 p.m. | Fox | Memphis Showboats | 24–18 | 6–2 | Ford Field | 9,370 |
| 9 | Sunday | May 26 | 2:30 p.m. | Fox | at Houston Roughnecks | 26–22 | 7–2 | Rice Stadium | 6,527 |
| 10 | Saturday | June 1 | 2:00 p.m. | ESPN | at Birmingham Stallions | 19–20 | 7–3 | Protective Stadium | 7,133 |

== Game summaries ==
=== Week 1: vs. St. Louis Battlehawks ===
Week 1: St. Louis Battlehawks at Michigan Panthers – Game summary

| Quarter | 1 | 2 | 3 | 4 | Total |
|---|---|---|---|---|---|
| Battlehawks | 0 | 3 | 0 | 13 | 16 |
| Panthers | 0 | 0 | 7 | 11 | 18 |

at Ford Field, Detroit, Michigan

- Date: March 30
- Game time: 4:00 p.m. EDT
- Game weather: None (Indoor stadium)
- Game attendance: 9,444
- Referee: Adam Savoie
- TV announcers (Fox): Kevin Kugler, Devin Gardner and Jake Butt
- Recap, Game Book

Game information

First quarter

- No scoring plays

Second quarter

- STL – Andre Szmyt 36-yard field goal, 0:00. Battlehawks 3–0. Drive: 16 plays, 87 yards, 7:51.

Third quarter

- MICH – E. J. Perry 4-yard run (Matt Colburn one-point run), 5:26. Panthers 7–3. Drive: 8 plays, 93 yards, 5:03.

Fourth quarter

- STL – Jake Sutherland 5-yard pass from A. J. McCarron (two-point pass failed), 7:55. Battlehawks 9–7. Drive: 6 plays, 29 yards, 2:47.
- MICH – E. J. Perry 8-yard run (E. J. Perry-Devin Ross two-point pass), 5:01. Panthers 15–9. Drive: 5 plays, 56 yards, 2:54.
- STL – Marcell Ateman 5-yard pass from A. J. McCarron (A. J. McCarron-Jake Sutherland one-point pass), 7:55. Battlehawks 16–15. Drive: 11 plays, 44 yards, 4:12.
- MICH – Jake Bates 64-yard field goal, 0:03. Panthers 18–16. Drive: 8 plays, 19 yards, 0:46.

Top passers

- STL – A. J. McCarron – 24/37, 216 yards, 2 TD
- MICH – E. J. Perry – 12/24, 176 yards, 2 INT

Top rushers

- STL – Wayne Gallman – 13 rushes, 40 yards
- MICH – Wes Hills – 11 rushes, 85 yards

Top receivers

- STL – Marcell Ateman – 6 receptions, 60 yards, TD
- MICH – Devin Ross – 2 receptions, 46 yards

== Standings ==
2024 UFL standings
USFL Conference
| Team | W | L | PCT | GB | TD+/- | TD+ | TD- | DIV | PF | PA | DIFF | STK |
|---|---|---|---|---|---|---|---|---|---|---|---|---|
| (y) Birmingham Stallions | 9 | 1 | .900 | – | 11 | 31 | 20 | 6–0 | 265 | 180 | 85 | W1 |
| (x) Michigan Panthers | 7 | 3 | .700 | 2 | 5 | 27 | 22 | 4–2 | 228 | 189 | 39 | L1 |
| (e) Memphis Showboats | 2 | 8 | .200 | 7 | -19 | 20 | 39 | 2–4 | 188 | 290 | -102 | W1 |
| (e) Houston Roughnecks | 1 | 9 | .100 | 8 | -12 | 17 | 29 | 0–6 | 158 | 233 | -75 | L6 |
XFL Conference
| Team | W | L | PCT | GB | TD+/- | TD+ | TD- | DIV | PF | PA | DIFF | STK |
| (y) St. Louis Battlehawks | 7 | 3 | .700 | – | 7 | 31 | 24 | 5–1 | 260 | 202 | 58 | W1 |
| (x) San Antonio Brahmas | 7 | 3 | .700 | – | 12 | 24 | 12 | 3–3 | 192 | 153 | 39 | L1 |
| (e) DC Defenders | 4 | 6 | .400 | 3 | -2 | 24 | 26 | 2–4 | 209 | 251 | -42 | L1 |
| (e) Arlington Renegades | 3 | 7 | .300 | 4 | -2 | 26 | 28 | 2–4 | 247 | 249 | -2 | W2 |
(x)–clinched playoff berth; (y)–clinched division; (e)–eliminated from playoff contention

== Postseason ==
=== Schedule ===
| Week | Day | Date | Kickoff | TV | Opponent | Results | | Location | Attendance |
| Week | Day | Date | Kickoff | TV | Opponent | Score | Record | Location | Attendance |
|---|---|---|---|---|---|---|---|---|---|
| USFL Conference Championship | Saturday | June 8 | 3:00 p.m. | ABC | at Birmingham Stallions | 18–31 | 0–1 | Protective Stadium | 10,287 |

== Final roster ==
2024 Michigan Panthers final roster
| Quarterbacks: 8 Danny Etling; 19 Brian Lewerke; 4 E. J. Perry; Running backs: 26 Matt Colburn; 28 Nate McCrary; 35 Toa Taua; Wide receivers: 15 Devin Gray; 14 Siaosi Mariner; 86 Samson Nacua; 18 Trey Quinn; 12 Devin Ross; 9 Marcus Simms; 2 Terry Wright; Tight ends: 82 Derrick Deese Jr.; 80 Cole Hikutini; 84 Gunnar Oakes | Offensive linemen: 73 Jake Burton G; 69 Cohl Cabral G/C; 64 Joshua Dunlop T; 79 Jarrett Horst T; 61 Noah Johnson C; 75 Ryan Nelson G; 72 Chim Okorafor T; 77 Ryan Pope T; 65 James Walker G; Defensive linemen: 97 Ron'Dell Carter DE; 96 T. J. Carter DT; 55 Garrett Marino DT; 43 Vantrel McMillan DE; 99 Walter Palmore DT; 57 Breeland Speaks DE; 52 Mika Tafua DE; 48 Kenny Willekes DE | Linebackers: 10 Noah Dawkins; 47 Bumper Pool; 30 DaShaun White; 11 Javin White; Defensive backs: 36 Adonis Alexander CB; 7 Corrion Ballard FS; 3 Nate Brooks CB; 6 Keith Gipson Jr. CB; 24 Kiante Hardin CB; 29 Sean Mahone SS; 21 Kai Nacua SS; 13 Bryce Torneden CB; 1 Levonta Taylor CB; 32 Kedrick Whitehead Jr. FS; Special teams: 28 Jake Bates K; 41 Brock Miller P; 44 Jordan Ober LS | Reserve lists: 98 Levi Bell DT (IR); 34 Raymond Calais RB (Susp.); -- Davis Cheek QB Retired; 90 Jesus Gibbs DE (IR); 5 Frank Ginda LB (IR); 85 Nick Guggemos TE (IR); 31 Wes Hills RB (IR); 17 Bryce Perkins QB (IR); 95 Daniel Wise DT (IR); 50 active, 9 inactive |

== Staff ==
The 2024 coaching staff was announced on February 21, 2024.

Front office

- General manager – Steve Kazor

Head coach Head coach – Mike Nolan

Offensive coaches

- Offensive Coordinator/Quarterbacks – Marcel Bellefeuille
- Special Teams/Wide Receivers – Jaron Fairman
- Offensive Line – Tim Holt
- Running Backs – Jordan Pavlisin
- Tight ends – Gary Watkins

Defensive coaches

- Defensive Coordinator/Defensive Line – Collin Bauer
- Defensive Backs – Brock Marion
- Linebackers – Christian Runza
