= Dresser Winn =

American gridiron football player (born 1998)

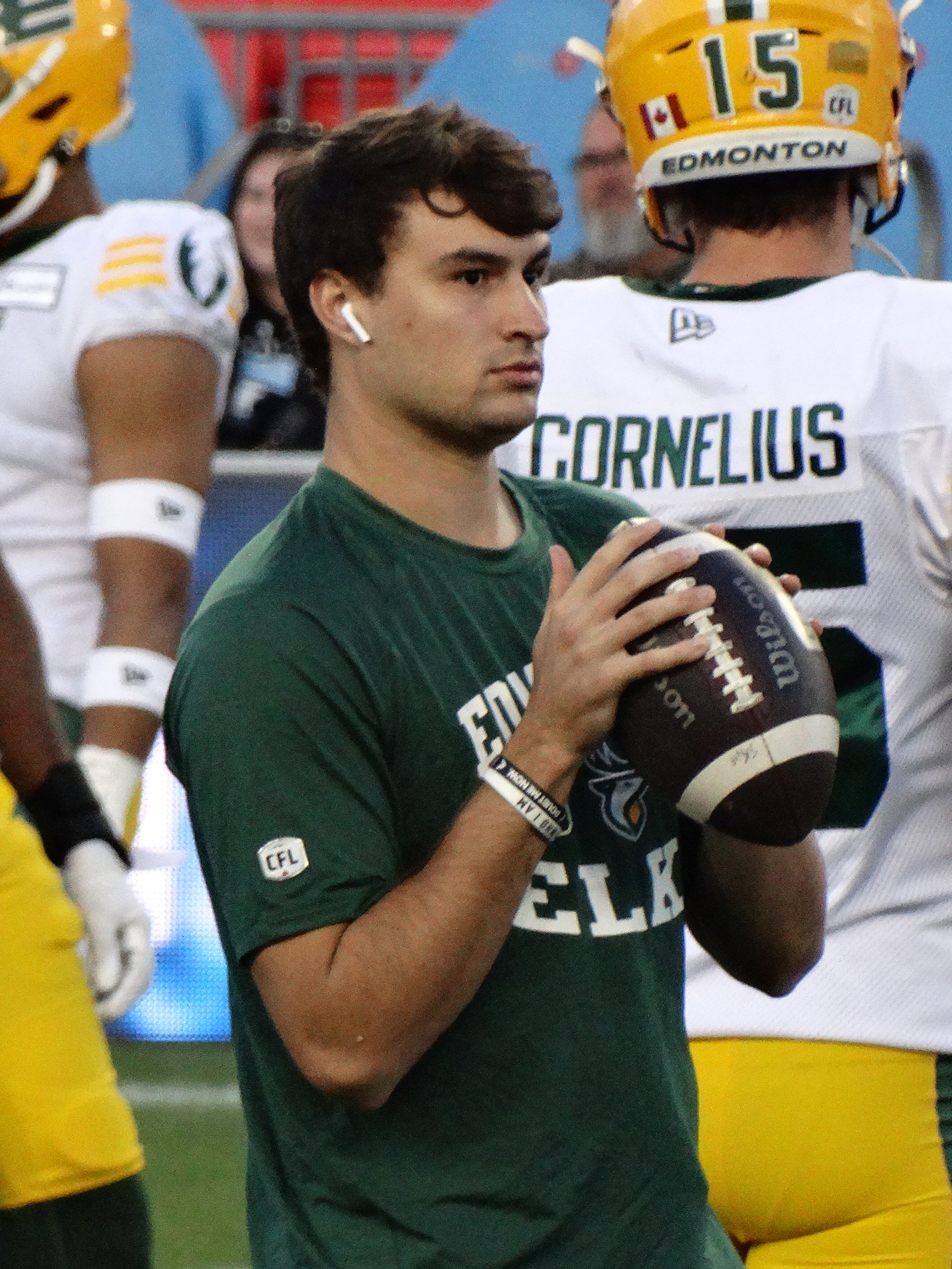
- Winn with the Edmonton Elks in 2023

Profile
- Position: Quarterback

Personal information
- Born: November 11, 1998 (age 27); Dresden, Tennessee, U.S.
- Listed height: 6 ft 3 in (1.91 m)
- Listed weight: 212 lb (96 kg)

Career information
- High school: Dresden (TN)
- College: UT Martin (2017–2022)
- NFL draft: 2023: undrafted

Career history
- Los Angeles Rams (2023)*; Edmonton Elks (2023)*; Los Angeles Rams (2023)*; Memphis Showboats (2025); Los Angeles Rams (2025)*; Montreal Alouettes (2026)*
- * Offseason or practice squad member only

Awards and highlights
- Second-team All-OVC (2022)
- Stats at Pro Football Reference

Dresser Winn (born November 11, 1998) is an American professional football quarterback. He has been a member of the Los Angeles Rams, the Edmonton Elks and Montreal Alouettes of the Canadian Football League (CFL), and the Memphis Showboats of the United Football League (UFL). He played college football for the UT Martin Skyhawks.

== Early life ==
Winn grew up in Dresden, Tennessee and attended Dresden High School. During high school, he completed 137 out of 191 passing attempts for 2,630 yards with 38 touchdowns and eight interceptions while rushing for 739 yards and six scores on 82 carries. He was rated a two-star recruit and originally committed to play college football at Western Michigan but instead committed to play college football at UT Martin.

== College career ==
Winn started five games during his true freshman season in 2017 with the UT-Martin Skyhawks and passed for 744 passing yards, five touchdowns and one interception. During the 2018 season, he played in and started seven games before suffering an injury that would have him sit out for the rest of the season. He finished the season with completing 154 out of 234 passing attempts for 1,601 yards, 12 passing touchdowns and nine interceptions. During the 2019 season, he played in two games and was redshirted. He finished the season with completing five out of nine passing attempts for 59 yards. During the 2020 season, he played in four games at quarterback and the team's primary punter before suffering through a season-ending injury. He finished the season with completing six out of 11 passing attempts for 30 yards. During the 2021 season, he played in three games and finished the season with completing 45 out of 91 passing attempts for 438 yards, two touchdowns and two interceptions. During the 2022 season, he played in and started all 11 games at quarterback and finished the season with completing 232 of 379 pass attempts for 2,928 yards, 18 touchdowns and 11 interceptions.

=== Statistics ===
| Season | Team | Games | | Passing | | | | | | | | Rushing | | | |
| Season | Team | GP | Record | Cmp | Att | Pct | Yds | Avg | TD | Int | Rtg | Att | Yds | Avg | TD |
|---|---|---|---|---|---|---|---|---|---|---|---|---|---|---|---|
| 2017 | UT Martin | 5 | 3–2 | 50 | 90 | 55.6 | 744 | 8.3 | 5 | 1 | 141.1 | 66 | 120 | 1.8 | 1 |
| 2018 | UT Martin | 7 | 1–6 | 154 | 234 | 65.8 | 1,601 | 6.8 | 12 | 9 | 143.5 | 55 | 48 | 0.9 | 3 |
| 2019 | UT Martin | 2 | — | 5 | 9 | 55.6 | 59 | 6.6 | 0 | 1 | 88.4 | 2 | 1 | 0.5 | 0 |
| 2020 | UT Martin | 4 | — | 6 | 11 | 54.5 | 30 | 2.7 | 0 | 0 | 77.5 | 8 | 16 | 2.0 | 1 |
| 2021 | UT Martin | 3 | 1–1 | 45 | 91 | 49.5 | 438 | 4.8 | 2 | 2 | 92.7 | 11 | -28 | -2.5 | 1 |
| 2022 | UT Martin | 11 | 7–4 | 232 | 379 | 61.2 | 2,928 | 7.7 | 18 | 11 | 136.0 | 32 | 7 | 0.2 | 3 |
| Career | | 32 | 12−13 | 492 | 814 | 60.4 | 5,800 | 7.1 | 37 | 24 | 129.4 | 174 | 164 | 0.9 | 9 |

== Professional career ==
Pre-draft measurables
| Height | Weight | Arm length | Hand span | 40-yard dash | 10-yard split | 20-yard split | Three-cone drill | Vertical jump | Broad jump |
|---|---|---|---|---|---|---|---|---|---|
| 6 ft 2 5/8 in (1.90 m) | 215 lb (98 kg) | 33 3/4 in (0.86 m) | 8 3/4 in (0.22 m) | 4.83 s | 1.71 s | 2.81 s | 7.27 s | 33.0 in (0.84 m) | 9 ft 3 in (2.82 m) |
All values from Pro Day

=== Los Angeles Rams ===
Winn was signed by the Los Angeles Rams as an undrafted free agent on May 1, 2023. He was waived by Los Angeles on August 29.

=== Edmonton Elks ===
On September 30, 2023, it was announced that Winn had signed with the Edmonton Elks. He spent time on the team's practice roster and was released on October 17.

=== Los Angeles Rams (second stint) ===
On November 1, 2023, Winn was signed to the Los Angeles Rams' practice squad. He was released by the team on November 7. Winn was re-signed to the Rams' practice squad on January 2, 2024. He signed a reserve/future contract with Los Angeles on January 15. Winn was waived as a part of preliminary roster cuts on August 25.

=== Memphis Showboats ===
On March 3, 2025, Winn signed with the Memphis Showboats of the United Football League (UFL). Winn made his UFL debut in Week 5 against the Birmingham Stallions, almost 900 days since his last start in college. Winn lead the Showboats to their first win of the season completing 17-of-29 passes for 235 yards, including a 78-yard touchdown to wide receiver Dee Anderson. For his performance, he won the UFL Offensive Player of the Week.

=== Los Angeles Rams (third stint) ===
On June 25, 2025, Winn signed with the Los Angeles Rams. He was waived by the Rams on August 24.

=== Montreal Alouettes ===
On February 9, 2026, Winn signed with the Montreal Alouettes, but was an early training camp cut on May 13.

== UFL career statistics ==
| Year | Team | Games | | | Passing | | | | | | | | | Rushing | | | | |
| Year | Team | GP | GS | Record | Cmp | Att | Pct | Yds | Y/A | Lng | TD | Int | Rtg | Att | Yds | Avg | Lng | TD |
|---|---|---|---|---|---|---|---|---|---|---|---|---|---|---|---|---|---|---|
| 2025 | MEM | 5 | 4 | 1–3 | 80 | 138 | 58.0 | 834 | 6.0 | 78 | 3 | 4 | 70.7 | 13 | 52 | 4.0 | 15 | 1 |
| Career | | 5 | 4 | 1–3 | 80 | 138 | 58.0 | 834 | 6.0 | 78 | 3 | 4 | 70.7 | 13 | 52 | 4.0 | 15 | 1 |

== Personal life ==
After the NCAA began allowing student-athletes to be compensated for the use of their Name, Image and Likeness (NIL) in 2021, Winn became the first collegiate athlete to endorse a political candidate when he endorsed Colin Johnson, a family friend, in the election for District Attorney of Tennessee's 27th Judicial District.
