= 2024 Birmingham Stallions season =

American professional football season

- Owner: National Spring Football League Enterprises Co, LLC, (Fox Sports)
- General manager: Zach Potter
- Head coach: Skip Holtz
- Home stadium: Protective Stadium

Results
- Record: 9–1
- Conference place: 1st in USFL Conference
- Playoffs: Won Conference Finals (vs. Panthers) 31–18; Won UFL Championship (vs. Brahmas) 25–0

Uniform

The 2024 season was the Birmingham Stallions first season in the United Football League and their third under head coach Skip Holtz and general manager Zach Potter. The Stallions defended their back-to-back 2022 and 2023 USFL championship to create a three-peat and becoming the first UFL champions.

After the season, the Stallions general manager, Zach Potter, left for the same position at Sacramento State.

== Regular season ==
=== Schedule ===
All times Central

Week	Day	Date	Kickoff	TV	Opponent	Results		Location	Attendance
Week	Day	Date	Kickoff	TV	Opponent	Score	Record	Location	Attendance
1	Saturday	March 30	12:00 p.m.	Fox	at Arlington Renegades	W 27–14	1–0	Choctaw Stadium	14,153
2	Sunday	April 7	11:00 a.m.	ESPN	at Michigan Panthers	W 20–13	2–0	Ford Field	7,475
3	Saturday	April 13	6:00 p.m.	Fox	Memphis Showboats	W 33–14	3–0	Protective Stadium	12,265
4	Saturday	April 20	6:00 p.m.	Fox	DC Defenders	W 20–18	4–0	Protective Stadium	7,262
5	Saturday	April 27	6:00 p.m.	Fox	at Houston Roughnecks	W 32–9	5–0	Rice Stadium	6,285
6	Saturday	May 4	11:00 a.m.	ABC	at Memphis Showboats	W 39–21	6–0	Simmons Bank Liberty Stadium	5,609
7	Saturday	May 11	3:00 p.m.	Fox	St. Louis Battlehawks	W 30–26	7–0	Protective Stadium	14,056
8	Saturday	May 18	7:00 p.m.	ESPN2	Houston Roughnecks	W 35–28	8–0	Protective Stadium	10,245
9	Saturday	May 25	2:00 p.m.	ABC	at San Antonio Brahmas	L 9–18	8–1	Alamodome	11,839
10	Saturday	June 1	1:00 p.m.	ESPN	Michigan Panthers	W 20–19	9–1	Protective Stadium	7,133

=== Game summaries ===
==== Week 1: at Arlington Renegades ====
Week 1: Birmingham Stallions at Arlington Renegades – Game summary

Quarter	1	2	3	4	Total
Stallions	0	11	8	8	27
Renegades	3	8	3	0	14

at Choctaw Stadium, Arlington, Texas

- Date: March 30
- Game time: 12:00 p.m. CDT
- Game weather: Overcast, 71 °F (22 °C)
- Game attendance: 14,153
- Referee: Michael Vandervelde
- TV announcers (Fox): Curt Menefee, Joel Klatt and Brock Huard
- Recap, Game Book

Game information

First quarter

- ARL – Taylor Russolino 38-yard field goal, 3:08. Renegades 3–0. Drive: 10 plays, 45 yards, 5:56.

Second quarter

- BHAM – Chris Blewitt 27-yard field goal, 12:30. Tied 3–3. Drive: 10 plays, 45 yards, 5:38.
- ARL – Isaiah Winstead 51-yard pass from Luis Perez (Luis Perez-Isaiah Winstead two-point pass), 9:01. Renegades 11–3. Drive: 6 plays, 72 yards, 3:29.
- BHAM – Deon Cain 39-yard pass from Matt Corral (Matt Corral-Ricky Person Jr. two-point pass), 0:03. Tied 11–11. Drive: 8 plays, 83 yards, 1:17.

Third quarter

- BHAM – Ricky Person Jr. 2-yard run (Matt Corral-Gary Jennings Jr. two-point pass), 4:59. Stallions 19–11. Drive: 5 plays, 45 yards, 1:53.
- ARL – Taylor Russolino 45-yard field goal, 0:00. Stallions 19–14. Drive: 8 plays, 29 yards, 5:07.

Fourth quarter

- BHAM – C. J. Marable 7-yard run (Matt Corral-Amari Rodgers two-point pass), 11:25. Stallions 27–14. Drive: 7 plays, 50 yards, 3:35.

Top passers

- BHAM – Matt Corral – 12/21, 201 yards, TD, INT
- ARL – Luis Perez – 19/28, 214 yards, TD, INT

Top rushers

- BHAM – C. J. Marable – 18 rushes, 67 yards, TD
- ARL – Leddie Brown – 8 rushes, 30 yards

Top receivers

- BHAM – Deon Cain – 3 receptions, 66 yards, TD
- ARL – Isaiah Winstead – 2 receptions, 60 yards, TD

==== Week 2: at Michigan Panthers ====
Week 2: Birmingham Stallions at Michigan Panthers – Game summary

Quarter	1	2	3	4	Total
Stallions	3	14	3	0	20
Panthers	0	10	3	0	13

at Ford Field, Detroit, Michigan

- Date: April 7
- Game time: 11:00 a.m. CDT
- Game weather: None (indoor stadium)
- Game attendance: 7,475
- Referee: Scott Walker
- TV announcers (ESPN): Lowell Galindo, Tom Luginbill, Harry Douglas and Kayla Burton
- Recap, Game book

Game information

First quarter

- BHAM – Chris Blewitt 34-yard field goal, 5:42. Stallions 3–0. Drive: 6 plays, 27 yards, 3:11.

Second quarter

- BHAM – Chris Blewitt 30-yard field goal, 10:11. Stallions 6–0. Drive: 8 plays, 69 yards, 4:42.
- BHAM – Chris Blewitt 38-yard field goal, 4:35. Stallions 9–0. Drive: 7 plays, 20 yards, 4:03.
- MICH – Marcus Simms 76-yard pass from E. J. Perry (E. J. Perry-Cole Hikutini one-point pass), 3:16. Stallions 9–7. Drive: 3 plays, 77 yards, 1:19.
- BHAM – Ricky Person Jr. 1-yard run (Matt Corral-Kevin Austin Jr. two-point pass), 0:26. Stallions 17–7. Drive: 5 plays, 28 yards, 1:04.
- MICH – Jake Bates 62-yard field goal, 0:00. Stallions 17–10. Drive: 4 plays, 10 yards, 0:26.

Third quarter

- BHAM – Chris Blewitt 20-yard field goal, 7:16. Stallions 20–10. Drive: 12 plays, 56 yards, 7:44
- MICH – Jake Bates 52-yard field goal, 4:16. Stallions 20–13. Drive: 6 plays, 14 yards, 3:00

Fourth quarter

- No scoring plays.

Top passers

- BHAM – Adrian Martinez – 8/15, 88 yards
- MICH – E. J. Perry – 20/33, 203 yards, TD, INT

Top rushers

- BHAM – Adrian Martinez – 8 rushes, 65 yards
- MICH – E. J. Perry – 4 rushes, 25 yards

Top receivers

- BHAM – Marlon Williams – 3 receptions, 32 yards
- MICH – Marcus Simms – 3 receptions, 96 yards, TD

==== Week 3: vs. Memphis Showboats ====
Week 3: Memphis Showboats at Birmingham Stallions – Game summary

Quarter	1	2	3	4	Total
Showboats	6	6	0	2	14
Stallions	12	6	3	12	33

at Protective Stadium, Birmingham, Alabama

- Date: April 13
- Game time: 6:00 p.m. CDT
- Game weather: Sunny, 79 °F (26 °C)
- Game attendance: 12,265
- Referee: Bryan Banks
- TV announcers (Fox): Curt Menefee, Mark Sanchez and Brock Huard
- Recap, Game book

Game information

First quarter

- BHAM – Jace Sternberger 6-yard pass from Adrian Martinez (two-point pass failed), 5:36. Stallions 6–0. Drive: 12 plays, 66 yards, 7:07.
- MEM – Vinny Papale 23-yard pass from Case Cookus (one-point pass failed), 0:56. Tied 6–6. Drive: 4 plays, 36 yards, 2:02.
- BHAM – Marlon Williams 41-yard pass from Adrian Martinez (two-point pass failed), 0:02. Stallions 12–6. Drive: 2 plays, 52 yards, 0:49.

Second quarter

- MEM – Matt Coghlin 57-yard field goal, 9:07. Stallions 12–9. Drive: 9 plays, 36 yards, 5:55.
- BHAM – Chris Blewitt 22-yard field goal, 1:56. Stallions 15–9. Drive: 13 plays, 63 yards, 7:11.
- MEM – Matt Coghlin 37-yard field goal, 0:14. Stallions 15–12. Drive: 10 plays, 53 yards, 1:42.
- BHAM – Chris Blewitt 46-yard field goal, 0:00. Stallions 18–12. Drive: 2 plays, 36 yards, 0:14.

Third quarter

- BHAM – Chris Blewitt 43-yard field goal, 3:23. Stallions 21–12. Drive: 7 plays, 40 yards, 4:02.

Fourth quarter

- BHAM – Ricky Person Jr. 5-yard run (one-point run failed), 14:23. Stallions 27–12. Drive: 5 plays, 75 yards, 1:46.
- BHAM – Adrian Martinez 11-yard run (one-point run failed), 8:28. Stallions 33–12. Drive: 5 plays, 61 yards, 2:41.
- MEM – Adrian Martinez sacked in end zone for a safety, 1:49. Stallions 33–14.

Top passers

- MEM – Case Cookus – 15/22, 139 yards, TD
- BHAM – Adrian Martinez – 18/28, 334 yards, 2 TD

Top rushers

- MEM – Titus Swen – 6 rushes, 14 yards
- BHAM – Adrian Martinez – 5 rushes, 44 yards, TD

Top receivers

- MEM – Jonathan Adams – 6 receptions, 49 yards
- BHAM – Deon Cain – 7 receptions, 144 yards

==== Week 4: vs. DC Defenders ====
Week 4: DC Defenders at Birmingham Stallions – Game summary

Quarter	1	2	3	4	Total
Defenders	6	0	6	6	18
Stallions	0	11	3	6	20

at Protective Stadium, Birmingham, Alabama

- Date: April 20
- Game time: 6:00 p.m. CDT
- Game weather: Overcast, 65 °F (18 °C)
- Game attendance: 7,262
- Referee: Jeff Heaser
- TV announcers (Fox): Kevin Kugler, Robert Smith and Brock Vereen
- Recap, Game book

Game information

First quarter

- DC – Chris Rowland 9-yard pass from Jordan Ta'amu (two-point pass failed), 3:29. Defenders 6–0. Drive: 9 plays, 86 yards, 3:49.

Second quarter

- BHAM – Amari Rodgers 50-yard pass from Matt Corral (one-point run failed), 2:58. Tied 6–6. Drive: 4 plays, 75 yards, 2:26.
- BHAM – Paxton Brooks tackled in end zone for a safety, 1:50. Stallions 8–6.
- BHAM – Ramiz Ahmed 46-yard field goal, 0:00. Stallions 11–6. Drive: 8 plays, 25 yards, 1:50.

Third quarter

- BHAM – Ramiz Ahmed 32-yard field goal, 9:37. Stallions 14–6. Drive: 9 plays, 34 yards, 5:23.
- DC – Kelvin Harmon 45-yard pass from Jordan Ta'amu (two-point pass failed), 0:53. Stallions 14–12. Drive: 1 play, 45 yards, 0:08.

Fourth quarter

- DC – Matt McCrane 23-yard field goal, 7:41. Defenders 15–14. Drive: 10 plays, 28 yards, 6:02.
- BHAM – Ramiz Ahmed 27-yard field goal, 3:26. Stallions 17–15. Drive: 8 plays, 60 yards, 4:15.
- DC – Matt McCrane 39-yard field goal, 1:04. Defenders 18–17. Drive: 7 plays, 27 yards, 2:22.
- BHAM – Ramiz Ahmed 46-yard field goal, 0:04. Stallions 20–18. Drive: 6 plays, 31 yards, 1:00.

Top passers

- DC – Jordan Ta'amu – 12/22, 161 yards, 2 TD
- BHAM – Matt Corral – 19/29, 240 yards, TD

Top rushers

- DC – Cam'Ron Harris – 11 rushes, 34 yards
- BHAM – Ricky Person Jr. – 11 rushes, 57 yards

Top receivers

- DC – Kelvin Harmon – 5 receptions, 93 yards, TD
- BHAM – Amari Rodgers – 4 receptions, 82 yards, TD

== Standings ==
2024 UFL standings
USFL Conference
Team	W	L	PCT	GB	TD+/-	TD+	TD-	DIV	PF	PA	DIFF	STK
(y) Birmingham Stallions	9	1	.900	–	11	31	20	6–0	265	180	85	W1
(x) Michigan Panthers	7	3	.700	2	5	27	22	4–2	228	189	39	L1
(e) Memphis Showboats	2	8	.200	7	-19	20	39	2–4	188	290	-102	W1
(e) Houston Roughnecks	1	9	.100	8	-12	17	29	0–6	158	233	-75	L6
XFL Conference
Team	W	L	PCT	GB	TD+/-	TD+	TD-	DIV	PF	PA	DIFF	STK
(y) St. Louis Battlehawks	7	3	.700	–	7	31	24	5–1	260	202	58	W1
(x) San Antonio Brahmas	7	3	.700	–	12	24	12	3–3	192	153	39	L1
(e) DC Defenders	4	6	.400	3	-2	24	26	2–4	209	251	-42	L1
(e) Arlington Renegades	3	7	.300	4	-2	26	28	2–4	247	249	-2	W2
(x)–clinched playoff berth; (y)–clinched division; (e)–eliminated from playoff contention

== Postseason ==
=== Schedule ===
Week	Day	Date	Kickoff	TV	Opponent	Results		Location	Attendance
Week	Day	Date	Kickoff	TV	Opponent	Score	Record	Location	Attendance
USFL Conference Championship	Saturday	June 8	2:00 p.m.	ABC	vs. Michigan Panthers	W 31–18	1–0	Protective Stadium	10,287
UFL Championship	Sunday	June 16	4:00 p.m.	Fox	at San Antonio Brahmas	W 25–0	2–0	The Dome at America's Center	27,396

== Roster ==
2024 Birmingham Stallions final roster
Quarterbacks: 2 Matt Corral; 9 Adrian Martinez; 6 J'Mar Smith; Running backs: 11 C. J. Marable; 23 Ricky Person Jr.; 34 Larry Rountree III; Wide receivers: 80 Kevin Austin Jr.; 8 Deon Cain; 5 Gary Jennings Jr.; 3 Amari Rodgers; 16 Binjimen Victor; 17 Marlon Williams; 18 Isaiah Zuber; Tight ends: 85 Marcus Baugh; 12 Jace Sternberger; 81 Jordan Thomas	Offensive linemen: 65 Deonte Brown G; 74 O'Shea Dugas G; 77 Derwin Gray G; 76 Darius Harper T; 68 Zack Johnson G; 63 Matt Kaskey T; 56 Cole Schneider C; 73 Armani Taylor-Prioleau T; Defensive linemen: 54 Taco Charlton DE; 96 Carlos Davis DT; 50 Jonathan Garvin DE; 95 DaMarcus Mitchell DE; 94 Jordan Thompson DT; 99 Dondrea Tillman DE; 58 Marvin Wilson DT; 97 Willie Yarbary DT	Linebackers: 47 DeMarquis Gates; 52 Maalik Hall; 51 Damon Lloyd; 57 Elijah Sullivan; 31 Kyahva Tezino; Defensive backs: 29 Ike Brown CB; 22 Lorenzo Burns CB; 7 T. J. Carter FS; 14 Nevelle Clarke CB; 28 Mark Gilbert CB; 36 Madre Harper CB; 19 Daniel Isom CB; 24 Kenny Robinson FS; 32 A. J. Thomas SS; 4 JoJo Tillery SS; Special teams: 30 Chris Blewitt K; 27 Ryan Langan LS; 15 Colby Wadman P	Reserve lists: 75 Christian DiLauro T (IR); 1 Chris Jackson CB (IR); -- Chris Orr LB Retired; -- Bo Scarbrough RB Retired; 33 Scooby Wright LB (IR); 50 active, 5 inactive

== Staff ==
The 2024 coaching staff was announced on February 21, 2024.

Birmingham Stallions staff
Front office: General manager – Zach Potter; Head coach Head coach – Skip Holtz Offensive coaches: Special Teams / Tight Ends – Chris Boniol; Offensive Line – Dave DeGuglielmo; Wide Receivers – Mike Jones; Co-Offensive Coordinator/Running Backs/Tight Ends – Philip Montgomery	Defensive coaches: Defensive coordinator – Corey Chamblin; Defensive Line – Bill Johnson; Assistant secondary – Daric Riley; Defensive assistant – Anthony Blevins

- DC John Chavis left team in 2024 during Week 9, added Anthony Blevins
