= Jake Bates =

American football player (born 1999)

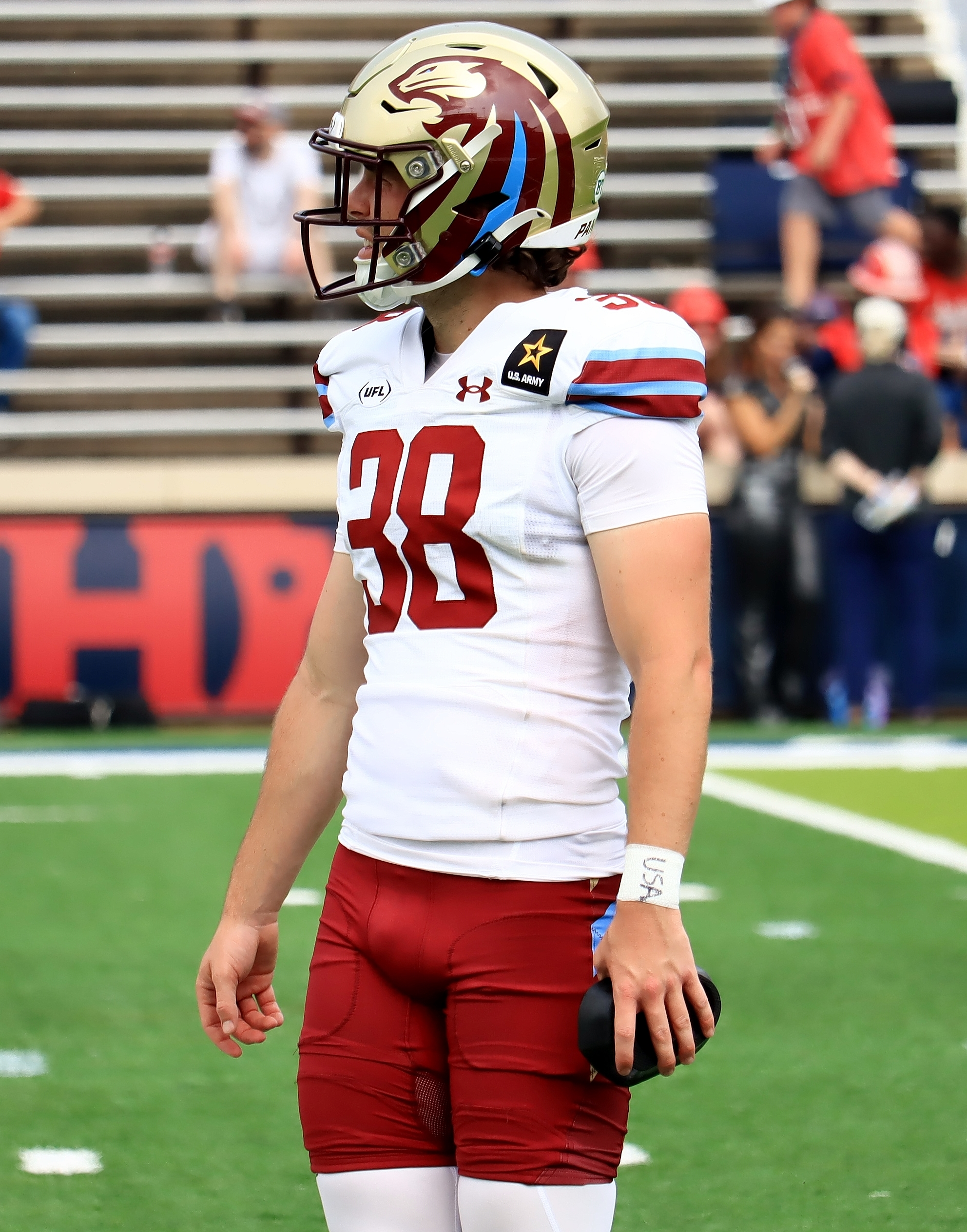
- Bates with the Michigan Panthers in 2024

No. 39 – Detroit Lions
- Position: Placekicker
- Roster status: Active

Personal information
- Born: March 3, 1999 (age 27); Tomball, Texas, U.S.
- Listed height: 5 ft 10 in (1.78 m)
- Listed weight: 202 lb (92 kg)

Career information
- High school: Tomball
- College: Texas State (2020–2021); Arkansas (2022)
- NFL draft: 2023: undrafted

Career history
- Houston Texans (2023)*; Michigan Panthers (2024); Detroit Lions (2024–present)
- * Offseason or practice squad member only

Awards and highlights
- All-UFL Team (2024); First-team All-SEC (2022)

Career NFL statistics as of Week 10, 2026
- Field goals made: 69
- Field goals attempted: 80
- Field goal %: 86.3%
- Extra points made: 147
- Extra points attempted: 152
- Extra point %: 96.7%
- Points: 354
- Longest field goal: 59
- Touchbacks: 113
- Stats at Pro Football Reference

Jake Bates (born March 3, 1999) is an American professional football placekicker for the Detroit Lions of the National Football League (NFL). He played college soccer for the Central Arkansas Bears and college football for the Texas State Bobcats and Arkansas Razorbacks. Bates holds the title for the longest field goal in UFL football history at 64 yards.

== Early life ==
Bates was born in Tomball, Texas and attended Tomball High School, graduating in 2017. During high school, he was a member of the football team, but was more prominently a standout in soccer.

== College career ==
After high school, Bates played two seasons of college soccer at Central Arkansas in 2017 and 2018, before transferring to play college football at Texas State in 2020 where he only handled kickoffs. He transferred to Arkansas after earning his business degree in 2022, once again only handling kickoff duties. He was named first-team All-SEC as a kickoff specialist in 2022, tying the selection with Jack Podlesny.

== Professional career ==
Pre-draft measurables
Height	Weight	Arm length	Hand span	Wingspan
6 ft 0 5/8 in (1.84 m)	204 lb (93 kg)	30 in (0.76 m)	8 7/8 in (0.23 m)	5 ft 11 1/4 in (1.81 m)
All values from Pro Day

=== Houston Texans ===
After going undrafted in the 2023 NFL draft, Bates signed with the Houston Texans on July 31, 2023. He was released in training camp on August 12, 2023. He briefly stepped away from pursuing football full-time, taking a job as a brick salesman in the Houston area.

=== Michigan Panthers ===
On December 25, 2023, Bates signed with the Michigan Panthers of the UFL. Bates's signing was one of several personnel decisions the league made based upon kickoff abilities as the UFL adopted a kickoff rule requiring the ball go 80 yards for a touchback, 15 yards longer than other levels of organized football.

On March 30, 2024, during Week 1 of the 2024 UFL season, Bates made a game-winning 64-yard field goal against the St. Louis Battlehawks, the longest field goal in the history of both the UFL and its predecessor leagues, five yards longer than the previous record set by Donny Hageman the previous year. The first in-game field goal of Bates' life.Bates, who had only attempted – and missed – one field goal before in his life (in high school), had made the kick twice, the first being discarded due to the Battlehawks icing the kicker. Bates would go on to, to date, kick two more field goals of 60 or more yards in 2024: an April 7 kick against Birmingham Stallions from 62 yards out, and a 60-yard kick against Arlington Renegades on May 5. The ball Bates kicked on the 64-yard field goal is on display at the Pro Football Hall of Fame as part of its "Pro Football Today" exhibit. He was named to the 2024 All-UFL team on June 5, 2024. His contract with the team was terminated on June 17, 2024, to sign with an NFL team.

=== Detroit Lions ===
On June 18, 2024, Bates signed a two-year contract with the Detroit Lions. Bates was one of only two UFL players to make a National Football League 53-man roster out of 77 who participated in the NFL's 2024 preseason (the other being Jalen Redmond).

In Week 7 of the 2024 season, Bates kicked a 44-yard game-winning field goal as the Lions defeated the Minnesota Vikings, 31–29, also being awarded NFC special teams Player of the Week for this feat. In Week 10, Bates kicked a 58-yard field goal against the Houston Texans to tie the game before hitting a 52-yard game-winning field goal in a 26–23 victory. Both field goals only narrowly passed through the uprights, on opposite sides from each other. In Week 13, on NFL on Thanksgiving Day against the Chicago Bears, Bates missed his first career NFL field goal, which was from 45 yards. In Week 14, Bates kicked a 35-yard field goal to win a close game on Thursday Night Football against the Green Bay Packers, securing a playoff spot for the Lions. In Week 17 against the San Francisco 49ers, Bates achieved the Lions single-season franchise record for points scored, surpassing the previous record of 134 points set by Jason Hanson in 2012. In the same game, Bates earned unintentional notoriety when cameras for Monday Night Football caught Bates in a seemingly suggestive hip stretching routine, to which he responded: "It's fun. I understand it."

On March 25, 2026, Bates re-signed with the Lions. In Week 9 against the Miami Dolphins, Bates hit all four of his field goals and his only extra point attempt in Detroit's 19-9 victory and earned NFC Special Teams Player of the Week for his performance.

== Statistics ==
=== UFL ===
==== Regular season ====
			Field goals					Points
Season	Team	GP	FGM	FGA	FG%	Blk	Lng	Pts
2024	MICH	10	17	22	77.2%	0	64	51
Career		10	17	22	77.2%	0	64	51

==== Postseason ====
			Field goals					Points
Season	Team	GP	FGM	FGA	FG%	Blk	Lng	Pts
2024	MICH	1	4	6	66.7%	1	53	12
Career		1	4	6	66.7%	1	53	12

=== NFL ===
Legend
**Bold**	Career high
	Led the league

==== Regular season ====
			Field goals					PATs			Points
Season	Team	GP	FGM	FGA	Pct	Blk	Lng	XPM	XPA	Pct	Pts
2024	DET	**17**	26	29	**89.6**	0	58	**64**	**67**	95.5	**142**
2025	DET	17	**27**	**34**	79.4	**1**	**59**	54	56	96.4	135
2026	DET	9	16	17	94.1	0	54	29	29	**100.0**	77
Career		43	69	80	86.3	1	59	147	152	96.7	354

==== Postseason ====
			Field goals					PATs			Points
Season	Team	GP	FGM	FGA	Pct	Blk	Lng	XPM	XPA	Pct	Pts
2024	DET	1	1	1	100.0	0	28	4	4	100.0	7
Career		1	1	1	100.0	0	28	4	4	100.0	7

== Personal life ==
Bates is a Christian. He is engaged to Presley Folkerts.
