= John DeFilippo =

American football player and coach (born 1978)

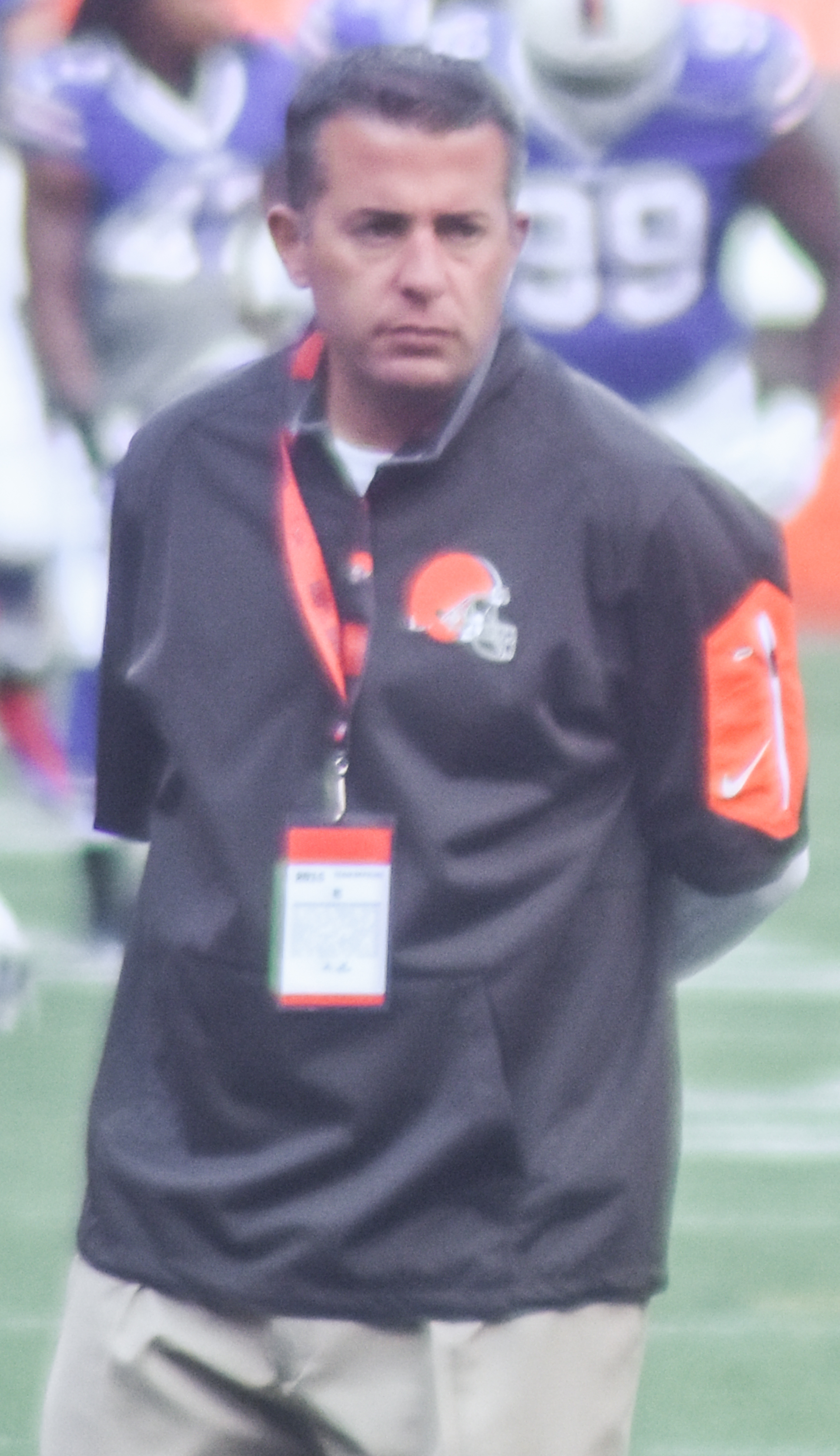
- DeFilippo with the Cleveland Browns in 2015

Kansas Jayhawks
- Title: Offensive analyst

Personal information
- Born: April 12, 1978 (age 48); Youngstown, Ohio, U.S.

Career information
- High school: Radnor (PA)
- College: James Madison (1996–1999)

Career history
- Fordham (2000) Quarterbacks coach; Notre Dame (2001–2002) Graduate assistant; Columbia (2003–2004) Quarterbacks coach; New York Giants (2005–2006) Offensive quality control coach; Oakland Raiders (2007–2008) Quarterbacks coach; New York Jets (2009) Assistant quarterbacks coach; San Jose State (2010) Quarterbacks coach; San Jose State (2011) Offensive coordinator & quarterbacks coach; Oakland Raiders (2012–2014) Quarterbacks coach; Cleveland Browns (2015) Offensive coordinator; Philadelphia Eagles (2016–2017) Quarterbacks coach; Minnesota Vikings (2018) Offensive coordinator; Jacksonville Jaguars (2019) Offensive coordinator; Chicago Bears (2020) Quarterbacks coach; Chicago Bears (2021) Passing game coordinator & quarterbacks coach; New Orleans Breakers (2023) Head coach; Memphis Showboats (2024) Head coach; Kansas (2026–present) Offensive analyst

Awards and highlights
- Super Bowl champion (LII)

Head coaching record
- Regular season: USFL 7–3 (.700); UFL 2–8 (.200)
- Postseason: USFL 0–1 (.000)
- Career: USFL 7–4 (.636); UFL 2–8 (.200)
- Coaching profile at Pro Football Reference

John Eugene DeFilippo (born April 12, 1978) is an American football coach for the Kansas Jayhawks. He played college football as a quarterback at James Madison University, and has served as offensive coordinator for the Cleveland Browns, Minnesota Vikings, and Jacksonville Jaguars.

DeFilippo won a Super Bowl with the Philadelphia Eagles, serving as the team's quarterbacks coach. He has also been the head coach for the New Orleans Breakers of the United States Football League (USFL) and the Memphis Showboats of the United Football League (UFL).

== Early life and college playing career ==
DeFilippo was born in 1978 in Youngstown, Ohio. His father, Gene DeFilippo, was then offensive coordinator for the Youngstown State Penguins football team, a position he held until 1979. In 1980, the DeFilippo family moved to Nashville, as Gene became offensive backfield coach at Vanderbilt. John later spent his childhood in Spartanburg, South Carolina from 1984 to 1987 as his father was athletic director at USC Spartanburg, then in Lexington, Kentucky from 1987 to 1993, when his father was associate athletic director at the University of Kentucky.

In 1993, Gene DeFilippo became athletic director at Villanova University in Philadelphia. John DeFilippo enrolled at nearby Radnor High School in tenth grade and lived in a hotel with his father, from the summer to the early part of the school year. DeFilippo played quarterback on the Radnor football team. In his first start as a varsity football player, DeFilippo led Radnor to two touchdowns in the last 6:30 of Radnor's 16–14 victory over Penncrest High School. The winning score occurred when Bumper Howard (running back) fumbled into the end zone as he was being tackled, and Michael Cutler (an offensive lineman) leaped onto the ball in the end zone for the crucial touchdown. This win ended a 34-game losing streak for Radnor but would end up Radnor's only win of the season. As a junior in 1994, DeFilippo passed for over 1,200 yards and 10 touchdowns, and Radnor finished with a 2–9 record.

DeFilippo graduated from Radnor in 1996 and attended James Madison University (JMU). DeFilippo played at quarterback for the James Madison Dukes under head coach Alex Wood from 1996 to 1998 then Mickey Matthews in 1999. As a senior in 1999, DeFilippo played in 11 games as a backup and completed 8 of 18 passes for 90 yards. JMU finished the season 8–4, with the Atlantic 10 regular-season title and a berth in the Division I-AA playoffs. While a student at JMU, DeFilippo spent two summers doing NFL internships, in 1997 with the Carolina Panthers and 1998 with the Indianapolis Colts. DeFilippo graduated from JMU in 2000 with a bachelor's degree in speech communications with a concentration in public relations.

== Coaching career ==
=== Early career ===
DeFilippo became quarterbacks coach at Fordham in 2000 upon graduating from James Madison. The following year, DeFilippo enrolled at the University of Notre Dame to be a graduate assistant for the Notre Dame Fighting Irish. In the 2001 season, DeFilippo helped coach wide receivers and tight ends on Bob Davie's staff, then in 2002 worked with quarterbacks under Tyrone Willingham. From 2003 to 2004, DeFilippo was again quarterbacks coach at a Division I-AA program in New York City, Columbia, under Bob Shoop. He moved up to the NFL in 2005 as offensive quality control coach for the New York Giants under Tom Coughlin and held that position until 2006. In 2007, DeFilippo joined Lane Kiffin's staff on the Oakland Raiders as quarterbacks coach and remained on staff in 2008 when Tom Cable replaced Kiffin during the season. DeFilippo became quarterbacks coach for the New York Jets under Rex Ryan in 2009. The Jets that year finished 9–7 and in the playoffs, defeated the Cincinnati Bengals and San Diego Chargers to make their first trip to the AFC Championship Game in 11 years, before losing to their former division rival Indianapolis Colts 17–30. DeFilippo also coached rookie quarterback Mark Sanchez, whom in 2009, became only the second rookie quarterback in NFL history to win multiple playoff games.

DeFilippo returned to the college ranks in 2010 as quarterbacks coach at San Jose State under Mike MacIntyre. In 2011, DeFilippo also became offensive coordinator for San Jose State, in a season where San Jose State rose 32 places in national offensive rankings and improved to 5–7 from 1–12 the previous season.

=== Oakland Raiders (second stint) ===
In 2012, DeFilippo returned to the Oakland Raiders as quarterbacks coach, first under Dennis Allen, and then Tony Sparano.

=== Cleveland Browns ===
On January 21, 2015, DeFilippo was hired as the Cleveland Browns' new offensive coordinator. However, after only one season, DeFilippo was let go after head coach Mike Pettine was fired.

=== Philadelphia Eagles ===
On January 21, 2016, DeFilippo was hired as the quarterbacks coach of the Philadelphia Eagles. In his second season as quarterbacks coach, DeFilippo and the Eagles made their first Super Bowl in 13 years, where in a rematch of Super Bowl XXXIX, the Eagles defeated the New England Patriots 41–33 to win their first Super Bowl in franchise history.

=== Minnesota Vikings ===
Four days after winning Super Bowl LII, DeFilippo was hired as offensive coordinator of the Minnesota Vikings, the same team his Eagles defeated in the NFC Championship a month earlier. DeFilippo was fired after the Vikings lost 21–7 to the Seattle Seahawks on Monday Night Football in week 14.

=== Jacksonville Jaguars ===
On January 13, 2020, DeFilippo was fired by the Jacksonville Jaguars after only one season as the offensive coordinator.

=== Chicago Bears ===
On January 16, 2020, DeFilippo was hired by the Chicago Bears to be their quarterbacks coach on Matt Nagy's staff. DeFilippo had interviewed for the Bears' head coaching position in 2018, but lost out to Nagy. On February 8, 2021, DeFilippo was promoted to passing game coordinator while still holding the title of quarterbacks coach.

On June 13, 2022, DeFilippo announced that he would not coach that year.

=== New Orleans Breakers ===
On November 10, 2022, DeFilippo was hired as the head coach of the New Orleans Breakers.

He guided his team to a 4–0 start, but lost three games in a row to enter the final three games with a 4–3 record. The Breakers won out to finish 7–3, and faced the Birmingham Stallions in the 2023 USFL South Championship Game. However, the Breakers lost 47–22, and the Stallions ended up winning the championship against the Pittsburgh Maulers the following week.

=== Memphis Showboats ===
After the USFL and the XFL merged to create the United Football League, DeFilippo was named the Head Coach of the Memphis Showboats on January 1, 2024. The Showboats struggled to a 2-8 record, though they would win the season finale over the Houston Roughnecks, earning the number one pick in the UFL College Draft. Along with Memphis' general manager Dennis Polian, DeFilippo resigned as coach after the season ended.

=== Return to college ===
In 2026, DeFilippo was hired by Kansas as an offensive analyst.

== Head coaching record ==
Team	Year	Regular season					Postseason			
Team	Year	Won	Lost	Ties	Win %	Finish	Won	Lost	Win %	Result
NO	2023	7	3	0	.700	2nd in USFL South	0	1	.000	Lost in Division Finals to Birmingham Stallions
MEM	2024	2	8	0	.200	3rd in USFL Conference	-	-	-	-
Total		9	11	0	.450		0	1	.000	—
