= Gene DeFilippo =

American sports executive and college athletics administrator

Playing career
- c. 1972: Springfield (MA)
- Position: Quarterback

Coaching career (HC unless noted)
- 1975–1979: Youngstown State (OC)
- 1980–1982: Vanderbilt (offensive backfield)

Administrative career (AD unless noted)
- 1984–1987: South Carolina–Spartanburg
- 1987–1993: Kentucky (associate AD)
- 1993–1997: Villanova
- 1997–2012: Boston College

Eugene Benard DeFilippo Jr. is an American sports executive and former college athletics administrator. He served as the athletic director at the University of South Carolina–Spartanburg—now known as the University of South Carolina Upstate—from 1984 to 1987, at Villanova University from 1993 to 1997, and at Boston College from 1997 to 2012.

== Career ==
DeFilippo graduated from Springfield College in Massachusetts in 1973. There he played college football, lettering for three seasons as a quarterback. In 1974, DeFilippo completed a master's degree in educational administration at the University of Tennessee.

DeFilippo worked as an assistant football coach at Youngstown State University and at Vanderbilt University. He was an associate athletic director at the University of Kentucky from 1987 to 1993.

Boston College named DeFilippo as athletic director on September 16, 1997 effective at the beginning of October. During DeFilippo’s tenure as athletics director, Boston College won four national championships in men’s ice hockey, 11 national team and individual championships in sailing, and had 12 consecutive winning seasons in football. He also oversaw Boston College’s move from the Big East to the Atlantic Coast Conference. In 2009 he fired head football coach Jeff Jagodzinski after Jagodzinski interviewed for the New York Jets head coaching job. He was replaced by longtime defensive coordinator Frank Spaziani, who led the team to consecutive losing seasons in 2011 and 2012. In 2010 he fired men's basketball coach Al Skinner after only his second losing season in ten years. Under Skinner, the Eagles made the NCAA Division I men's basketball tournament seven times. BC would not return to the NCAA tournament under Skinner's successor, Steve Donahue, who had a 54-76 record in his four seasons as head coach, and they have not returned since. DeFilippo retired on September 30, 2012.

After leaving BC, DeFilippo became the managing director of Turnkey Search, and executive search and consulting firm for college programs.

== Personal life ==
His father, Eugene Benard "Gene" DeFilippo, was a quarterback at Holy Cross. His son, John DeFilippo, currently serves as the head coach of the New Orleans Breakers of the USFL.
