= 2024 Arlington Renegades season =

American professional football season

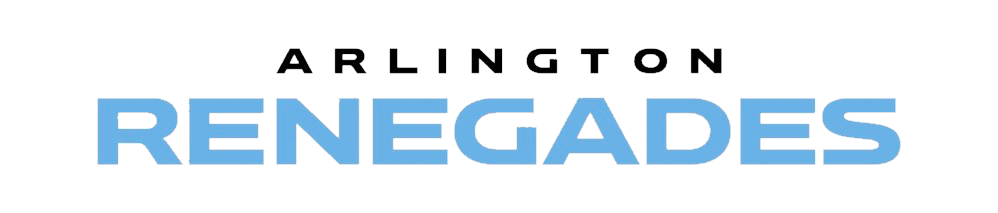
- Owner: Alpha Acquico, LLC
- General manager: Rick Mueller
- Head coach: Bob Stoops
- Home stadium: Choctaw Stadium

Results
- Record: 3–7
- Conference place: 4th in XFL Conference
- Playoffs: Did not qualify

Uniform

The 2024 Arlington Renegades season was the third season for the Arlington Renegades as a professional American football franchise and their first as part of the United Football League. The Renegades played their home games at the Choctaw Stadium and was led by head coach Bob Stoops.

== Previous season ==
The Renegades finished the regular season with a record of 4–6. They would earn their first playoff berth, where the Renegades would upset the South Division regular season division champions Houston Roughnecks. With the win, the Renegades would advance to the XFL Championship Game where they play the DC Defenders, winning by a score of 35–26 to achieve their first ever XFL Championship.

== Signees to the NFL ==
Player	Position	Date	NFL team	Ref.
Willie Taylor III	LB	May 17	Jacksonville Jaguars	

== Schedule ==
All times Central

Week	Day	Date	Kickoff	TV	Opponent	Results		Location	Attendance
Week	Day	Date	Kickoff	TV	Opponent	Score	Record	Location	Attendance
1	Saturday	March 30	12:00 p.m.	Fox	Birmingham Stallions	L 14–27	0–1	Choctaw Stadium	14,153
2	Saturday	April 6	7:00 p.m.	ABC	at St. Louis Battlehawks	L 24–27	0–2	The Dome at America's Center	40,317
3	Saturday	April 13	12:00 p.m.	ESPN	DC Defenders	L 28–29	0–3	Choctaw Stadium	8,411
4	Sunday	April 21	1:00 p.m.	FS1	at Houston Roughnecks	L 9–17	0–4	Rice Stadium	7,179
5	Saturday	April 27	6:00 p.m.	Fox	San Antonio Brahmas	L 15–25	0–5	Choctaw Stadium	10,283
6	Sunday	May 5	12:00 p.m.	Fox	at Michigan Panthers	L 27–28	0–6	Ford Field	7,428
7	Saturday	May 11	12:00 p.m.	ESPN	Memphis Showboats	W 47–23	1–6	Choctaw Stadium	8,042
8	Sunday	May 19	3:00 p.m.	Fox	at San Antonio Brahmas	L 15–20	1–7	Alamodome	11,395
9	Saturday	May 25	11:00 a.m.	ABC	St. Louis Battlehawks	W 36–22	2–7	Choctaw Stadium	8,545
10	Sunday	June 2	11:00 a.m.	ABC	at DC Defenders	W 32–31	3–7	Audi Field	13,080

== Game summaries ==
=== Week 1: vs. Birmingham Stallions ===
Week 1: Birmingham Stallions at Arlington Renegades – Game summary

Quarter	1	2	3	4	Total
Stallions	0	11	8	8	27
Renegades	3	8	3	0	14

at Choctaw Stadium, Arlington, Texas

- Date: March 30
- Game time: 12:00 p.m. CDT
- Game weather: Overcast, 71 °F (22 °C)
- Game attendance: 14,153
- Referee: Michael Vandervelde
- TV announcers (Fox): Curt Menefee, Joel Klatt and Brock Huard
- Recap, Game Book

Game information

First quarter

- ARL – Taylor Russolino 38-yard field goal, 3:08. Renegades 3–0. Drive: 10 plays, 45 yards, 5:56.

Second quarter

- BHAM – Chris Blewitt 27-yard field goal, 12:30. Tied 3–3. Drive: 10 plays, 45 yards, 5:38.
- ARL – Isaiah Winstead 51-yard pass from Luis Perez (Luis Perez-Isaiah Winstead two-point pass), 9:01. Renegades 11–3. Drive: 6 plays, 72 yards, 3:29.
- BHAM – Deon Cain 39-yard pass from Matt Corral (Matt Corral-Ricky Person Jr. two-point pass), 0:03. Tied 11–11. Drive: 8 plays, 83 yards, 1:17.

Third quarter

- BHAM – Ricky Person Jr. 2-yard run (Matt Corral-Gary Jennings Jr. two-point pass), 4:59. Stallions 19–11. Drive: 5 plays, 45 yards, 1:53.
- ARL – Taylor Russolino 45-yard field goal, 0:00. Stallions 19–14. Drive: 8 plays, 29 yards, 5:07.

Fourth quarter

- BHAM – C. J. Marable 7-yard run (Matt Corral-Amari Rodgers two-point pass), 11:25. Stallions 27–14. Drive: 7 plays, 50 yards, 3:35.

Top passers

- BHAM – Matt Corral – 12/21, 201 yards, TD, INT
- ARL – Luis Perez – 19/28, 214 yards, TD, INT

Top rushers

- BHAM – C. J. Marable – 18 rushes, 67 yards, TD
- ARL – Leddie Brown – 8 rushes, 30 yards

Top receivers

- BHAM – Deon Cain – 3 receptions, 66 yards, TD
- ARL – Isaiah Winstead – 2 receptions, 60 yards, TD

== Standings ==
2024 UFL standings
USFL Conference
Team	W	L	PCT	GB	TD+/-	TD+	TD-	DIV	PF	PA	DIFF	STK
(y) Birmingham Stallions	9	1	.900	–	11	31	20	6–0	265	180	85	W1
(x) Michigan Panthers	7	3	.700	2	5	27	22	4–2	228	189	39	L1
(e) Memphis Showboats	2	8	.200	7	-19	20	39	2–4	188	290	-102	W1
(e) Houston Roughnecks	1	9	.100	8	-12	17	29	0–6	158	233	-75	L6
XFL Conference
Team	W	L	PCT	GB	TD+/-	TD+	TD-	DIV	PF	PA	DIFF	STK
(y) St. Louis Battlehawks	7	3	.700	–	7	31	24	5–1	260	202	58	W1
(x) San Antonio Brahmas	7	3	.700	–	12	24	12	3–3	192	153	39	L1
(e) DC Defenders	4	6	.400	3	-2	24	26	2–4	209	251	-42	L1
(e) Arlington Renegades	3	7	.300	4	-2	26	28	2–4	247	249	-2	W2
(x)–clinched playoff berth; (y)–clinched division; (e)–eliminated from playoff contention

== Roster ==
2024 Arlington Renegades final roster
Quarterbacks: 15 Holton Ahlers; 12 Luis Perez; 10 Lindsey Scott Jr.; Running backs: 35 Jeremy Cox; 27 Devin Darrington; 2 De'Veon Smith; Wide receivers: 21 Deontay Burnett; 89 Juwan Manigo; 13 Caleb Vander Esch; 8 Tyler Vaughns; 11 LuJuan Winningham; 14 Isaiah Winstead; Tight ends: 81 Austin Allen; 80 Sal Cannella; 87 Seth Green	Offensive linemen: 59 Adrian Ealy T; 71 Bobby Evans T; 69 Noah Henderson T; 56 Cameron Hunt G/C; 66 Jake Lacina C; 78 Marquis Lucas T; 65 Marcus Minor G; 75 Dru Samia G; Defensive linemen: 45 Will Clarke DE; 6 DaVonte Lambert DE; 48 Tomasi Laulile NT; 90 Jalen Redmond NT; 44 Bunmi Rotimi DE; 94 Anree Saint-Amour DE; 97 La'Ron Stokes DE	Linebackers: 42 Vic Beasley OLB; 16 Storey Jackson OLB; 25 Marquel Lee MLB; 18 Donald Payne OLB; 36 Colin Schooler MLB; 50 Willie Taylor III OLB; Defensive backs: 23 Tenny Adewusi SS; 26 Cedric Anderson CB; 22 Jamal Carter FS; 46 Myles Dorn SS; 24 Darren Evans CB; 5 Ajene Harris CB/FS; 9 Delonte Hood CB; 29 James Jones IV FS; 28 Steven Jones Jr. CB; 1 Joe Powell FS; 20 Jamar Summers CB; Special teams: 37 Jonathan Garibay K; 7 Marquette King P; 49 Antonio Ortiz LS	Reserve lists: 26 Cameron Brown CB (IR); 4 Leddie Brown RB (IR); 17 Dae Dae Hunter RB (IR); 55 Garrett McGhin T (IR); 3 JaVonta Payton WR (IR); 51 Tuzar Skipper OLB (IR); 50 active, 6 inactive

== Staff ==
The 2024 coaching staff was announced on February 21, 2024.

Arlington Renegades staff
Front office: General manager – Rick Mueller; Head coach Head coach – Bob Stoops Offensive coaches: Tight Ends/Running Backs – Reggie Davis; Offensive Line – Jonathan Himebauch; Offensive Coordinator/QBs/WRs – Chuck Long; Special Teams – Scott Spurrier	Defensive coaches: Defensive Coordinator – Jay Hayes; Defensive Backs – Marvin Sanders; Linebackers – Bill Sheridan; Team operations: Quality Control – Matt McMillen
