= Memphis Showboats (2022) =

American football team in Memphis, Tennessee

- Logo
- Uniforms

General information
- Founded: November 15, 2022; 3 years ago
- Folded: 2025
- Stadium: Simmons Bank Liberty Stadium
- Colors: Navy blue, yellow, white
- Website: www.theufl.com/teams/memphis

Personnel
- Owners: Fox Corporation (50%), Dany Garcia, Dwayne Johnson, RedBird Capital Partners (50%)
- General manager: Jim Monos
- Head coach: Jim Turner

Team history
- Memphis Showboats (2023–2025)

Home fields
- Simmons Bank Liberty Stadium (2023–2025)

League / conference affiliations
- United States Football League (2023): South Division (2023); United Football League (2024–2025): USFL Conference (2024–2025)

Owners
- Fred Smith (personal sponsor, 2023–2025)

The Memphis Showboats were a professional American football team based in Memphis, Tennessee. The Showboats competed in the United Football League (UFL) and the United States Football League from 2023 to 2025.

== History ==
The Showboats name and branding is based on the original Memphis Showboats of the original United States Football League. On November 15, 2022, it was announced that the Showboats were joining the United States Football League (USFL) to fill the Tampa Bay Bandits' spot after the team announced their hiatus for the 2023 USFL season. On the same day, Todd Haley was announced as the Showboats' inaugural head coach. Players and coaches from the existing Bandits team were transferred to the Showboats.

The Showboats finished the 2023 USFL season with a 5–5 record, placing third in the USFL South Division. They did not make the playoffs in 2023. After the 2023 season, the Showboats fired Haley.

In September 2023, Axios reported that the XFL was in advanced talks with the USFL to merge the two leagues prior to the start of their 2024 seasons. On September 28, 2023, the XFL and USFL announced their intent to merge, pending regulatory approval. The merger was made official on December 31, 2023, and the league announced it would begin its combined season on March 30, 2024.

On January 3, 2024, the Showboats hired former New Orleans Breakers Head Coach and NFL Offensive Coordinator John DeFilippo.

The Showboats concluded the inaugural 2024 UFL season season with a 2–8 record, placing third in the USFL Conference and missing the playoffs. On June 2, 2024, the Showboats played the Houston Roughnecks, who were tied for last place with the showboats. It was announced that the winner of the game would receive the number one overall pick in the 2024 UFL draft. The Showboats would win 19–12, earning the number one pick. The Showboats would be unable to capitalize on that first overall draft pick, as Jason Bean, whom the Showboats selected, chose not to sign with the team and stayed with the Indianapolis Colts.

On August 2, 2024, the Showboats General manager Dennis Polian stepped down from his position.

On August 9, 2024, DeFilippo and the Showboats parted ways after a 2–8 season in 2024.

On September 23, 2024, the Showboats hired Former Tennessee Titans Head Coach Ken Whisenhunt. This came after the departure of Head Coach John DeFilippo. The Showboats also hired Jim Monos as their new General Manager on the same day.

On March 24, 2025, Jim Turner was named the Interim head coach for the Showboats after Ken Whisenhunt took an indefinite leave of absence to tend to an unidentified personal matter. On March 31, 2025, Whisenhunt returned, but resigned permanently 16 days later. Turner again assumed head coach duties; Noel Mazzone assumed the offensive playcalling duties that Whisenhunt had been handling.

The Showboats have had among the UFL's lowest attendances. League vice President Daryl Johnston noted that the city had a small core of deeply passionate fans, the Yacht Club, which he compared to the early 2010s-era Bills Mafia in his own home area of Western New York, a fan base that had likewise emerged in a time when its team was in a prolonged period of on-field malaise. Johnston had hoped on using the Bills Mafia as a template to build the Showboats fan base by word-of-mouth.

The league had initially indicated that the Showboats, despite its poor attendance and on-field performance, would return at least for 2026. The Showboats benefited from an unusual sponsorship arrangement with FedEx, whose founder and chairman Fred Smith had long been involved in professional football efforts in the city. FedEx's sponsorship deal with the UFL and the Showboats runs through the end of the 2026 season. Smith's unexpected death in June 2025 jeopardized those plans. By August, incoming UFL co-ownership had indicated it would be moving between two and four teams, reportedly all from the USFL Conference; the Birmingham Stallions were eventually spared from relocation, and the league was "trying" to save the Michigan Panthers with a more ideal stadium, effectively guaranteeing that Memphis and the Houston Roughnecks would be the two minimum teams relocating, one of them to Historic Crew Stadium in Columbus, Ohio.

In August 2025, the Showboats signed the starting quarterback, both top receivers, and an offensive lineman from the Albany Firebirds, the champions of Arena Football One.

The Showboats were formally discontinued on October 3, 2025. Players under contract were transferred to the Louisville Kings.

== Player history ==
=== Notable players ===
Season	Pos	Name	Notes
2023	RB	Alex Collins	Former NFL running back, 2016 NFL draft, 5th-round pick
2025	TE	Ryan Izzo	Former New England Patriots Tight End, 2018 7th Round Pick
2025	S	Obi Melifonwu	Former New England Patriots Safety, 2017 2nd Round Pick
2025	CB	Cameron Dantzler	Former Minnesota Vikings Cornerback, 2020 3rd Round Pick

== Coaches history ==
=== Head coaches ===
No.	Name	Term	Regular season				Playoffs			Awards
No.	Name	Term	GC	W	L	Win %	GC	W	L	Awards
Memphis Showboats
1	Todd Haley	2023	10	5	5	.500	–	–	–	
2	John DeFilippo	2024	10	2	8	.200	–	–	–	
3	Ken Whisenhunt	2025	2	0	2	.000	–	–	–	
4	Jim Turner	2025	8	2	6	.250	–	–	–	

=== Offensive coordinators ===
No.	Name	Term	Regular season				Playoffs			Awards
No.	Name	Term	GC	W	L	Win %	GC	W	L	Awards
Memphis Showboats
1	Bob Saunders	2023	10	5	5	.500	–	–	–	
2	Doug Martin	2024	10	2	8	.200	–	–	–	
3	T.J. Vernieri	2025	1	0	1	.000	–	–	–	
4	Ken Whisenhunt	2025	2	0	2	.000	–	–	–	
5	Noel Mazzone	2025	7	2	5	.287	–	–	–	

=== Defensive coordinators ===
No.	Name	Term	Regular season				Playoffs			Awards
No.	Name	Term	GC	W	L	Win %	GC	W	L	Awards
Memphis Showboats
1	Carnell Lake	2023–2024	20	7	13	.350	–	–	–	
2	Jarren Horton	2025	10	2	8	.200	–	–	–	

== Records ==
All-time Showboats leaders
Leader	Player	Record	Years with Showboats
Passing yards	Cole Kelley	1,534 passing yards	2023
Passing touchdowns	Cole Kelley Case Cookus	7 passing touchdowns	2023 2024
Rushing yards	Darius Victor	391 rushing yards	2024
Rushing touchdowns	Darius Victor	4 rushing touchdowns	2024
Receiving yards	Jonathan Adams	884 receiving yards	2024–2025
Receiving touchdowns	Vinny Papale	8 receiving touchdowns	2023–2024
Receptions	Vinny Papale	69 receptions	2023–2024
Tackles	Kyree Woods	86 tackles	2024–2025
Sacks	Greg Reaves	8.0 sacks	2023–2024
Interceptions	Delrick Abrams Kyee Woods	2 interceptions	2023–2024 2024–2025
Coaching wins	Todd Haley	5 wins	2023

=== Starting quarterbacks ===
Regular season – As of June 2, 2025

Season(s)	Quarterback(s)	Notes	Ref
2023	Cole Kelley (5–3) / Brady White (0–2)		
2024	Case Cookus (1–5) / Troy Williams (0–3) / Josh Love (1–0)		
2025	E. J. Perry (0–4) / Dresser Winn (1–3) / Troy Williams (1–1)		

Most games as starting quarterback

Name	Period	GP	GS	W	L	Pct
Cole Kelley	2023	9	8	5	3	.625
Case Cookus	2024	9	6	1	5	.167
Troy Williams	2024–2025	13	5	1	4	.200
Dresser Winn	2025	5	4	1	3	.250
E. J. Perry	2025	6	4	0	4	.000
Brady White	2023	5	2	0	2	.000
Josh Love	2024	5	1	1	0	1.000

== Statistics and records ==
=== Season-by-season records ===
UFL champions^{†} (2024–present)	USFL champions^{§} (2022–2023)	Conference champions^{*}	Division champions^{^}	Wild Card berth^{#}

Season	Team	League	Conference	Division	Regular season			Postseason results	Awards	Head coaches	Pct.
Season	Team	League	Conference	Division	Finish	W	L	Postseason results	Awards	Head coaches	Pct.
2023	2023	USFL	—N/a	South	4th	5	5		Derrick Dillon (STPOY)	Todd Haley	.500
2024	2024	UFL	USFL	—N/a	3rd	2	8		Darius Victor (SMOY)	John DeFilippo	.200
2025	2025	UFL	USFL	—N/a	4th	2	8			Ken Whisenhunt; Jim Turner	.000.250
Total						9	21	All-time regular season record (2023–2025)			.300
Total						0	0	All-time postseason record (2023–2025)			–
Total						9	21	All-time regular season and postseason record (2023–2025)			.300

== Rivalries ==
=== Houston Gamblers/Roughnecks ===
The Memphis Showboats shared Simmons Bank Liberty Stadium in Memphis, Tennessee with the Houston Gamblers (now called the Roughnecks) during the 2023 season. In 2024, the two teams played against each other in the season finale for the number one overall pick in the 2025 UFL draft. The winner would get the number one pick, the Showboats won the game 19–12 and earned the 2025 number one pick. Currently the Showboats have a 3–1 record against Houston.

=== Franchise matchup history ===
Team	Record	Pct.
New Jersey Generals	1–0	1.000
Pittsburgh Maulers	1–0	1.000
Houston Gamblers/Roughnecks	3–1	.750
New Orleans Breakers	1–1	.500
Michigan Panthers	1–2	.333
Arlington Renegades	0–1	.000
DC Defenders	0–1	.000
Philadelphia Stars	0–1	.000
San Antonio Brahmas	0–1	.000
St. Louis Battlehawks	0–2	.000
Birmingham Stallions	1–4	.200

- Defunct teams in light gray
