= Alex Mollette =

American football player (born 1998)

No. 53
- Position: Center

Personal information
- Born: June 23, 1998 (age 28); Suwanee, Georgia, U.S.
- Listed height: 6 ft 2 in (1.88 m)
- Listed weight: 300 lb (136 kg)

Career information
- High school: North Gwinnett (Suwanee, Georgia)
- College: Marshall (2016–2021)
- NFL draft: 2022: undrafted

Career history
- Indianapolis Colts (2022)*; Houston Roughnecks (2023); Detroit Lions (2023)*; Houston Roughnecks (2024)*; San Antonio Brahmas (2024)
- * Offseason or practice squad member only

Awards and highlights
- All-XFL Team (2023); First-team All-Conference USA (2021)
- Stats at Pro Football Reference

Alex Mollette (born June 23, 1998) is an American former professional football center. He played college football at Marshall. He signed with the Indianapolis Colts of the National Football League (NFL) as an undrafted free agent in 2022. He was also a member of the Detroit Lions of the NFL, the Houston Roughnecks of the XFL, and the San Antonio Brahmas of the United Football League (UFL).

== Professional career ==
Pre-draft measurables
Height	Weight	Arm length	Hand span	40-yard dash	10-yard split	20-yard split	20-yard shuttle	Three-cone drill	Vertical jump	Broad jump	Bench press
6 ft 2 1/8 in (1.88 m)	300 lb (136 kg)	33 in (0.84 m)	9 1/2 in (0.24 m)	5.08 s	1.77 s	2.87 s	4.68 s	7.53 s	30.5 in (0.77 m)	8 ft 11 in (2.72 m)	26 reps
All values from Pro Day

=== Indianapolis Colts ===
After going undrafted in the 2022 NFL draft, Mollette signed with the Indianapolis Colts on May 14th, 2022. He was released on August 23, 2022.

=== Houston Roughnecks (first stint) ===
On November 16, 2022, Mollette was drafted by the Houston Roughnecks of the XFL. He was named to the 2023 All-XFL Team.

=== Detroit Lions ===
On August 14, 2023, Mollette signed with the Detroit Lions. He was released on August 27, 2023.

=== Houston Roughnecks (second stint) ===
On October 23, 2023, Mollette re-signed with the Roughnecks. The Roughnecks brand was transferred to the Houston Gamblers when the XFL and United States Football League merged to create the United Football League (UFL).

=== San Antonio Brahmas ===
On January 5, 2024, Mollette was selected by the San Antonio Brahmas of the United Football League (UFL) during the 2024 UFL dispersal draft. During Week 1 of the 2024 UFL season against the DC Defenders, Mollette caught a 40-yard touchdown pass thrown by punter Brad Wing off of a fake field goal. Mollette was placed on injured reserve on April 8, 2024. He was activated on May 13, 2024.

Mollette retired.
