= Vinny Papale =

American gridiron football player (born 1996)

No. 13
- Position: Wide receiver

Personal information
- Born: October 17, 1996 (age 30); Cherry Hill, New Jersey, U.S.
- Listed height: 6 ft 0 in (1.83 m)
- Listed weight: 205 lb (93 kg)

Career information
- High school: Bishop Eustace (Pennsauken Township, New Jersey)
- College: Delaware (2015–2018)
- NFL draft: 2019: undrafted

Career history
- Montreal Alouettes (2020)*; TSL Conquerors (2020–2021); Tampa Bay Bandits (2022); Memphis Showboats (2023); New Orleans Breakers (2024)*; Memphis Showboats (2024)
- * Offseason or practice squad member only

Awards and highlights
- All-USFL Team (2023)

Career spring football statistics as of 2024
- Receptions: 97
- Receiving Yards: 1,000
- TD: 10
- Rushing Yards: -10
- TD: 0

Vincent Joseph Papale (born October 17, 1996) is an American former professional football wide receiver. He played college football for Delaware. He previously played for the Montreal Alouettes of the Canadian Football League (CFL), TSL Conquerors of The Spring League (TSL), and the Tampa Bay Bandits of the United States Football League (USFL). He is the son of former Philadelphia Eagles receiver Vince Papale, whose career was the basis of the 2006 film Invincible.

== Early life ==
Vinny Papale was born on October 17, 1996, in Cherry Hill, New Jersey. He went to high school at Bishop Eustace High School, playing football, lacrosse, and track & field. Due to the high school's small football team, Papale played on offense, defense, and special teams. He was a three-year starter at wide receiver, and two-year starter at defensive back. He was a three-time all-conference selection. He was named team captain as a senior. In his high school career, he contributed 64 receptions for 985 yards, 60 tackles, and seven interceptions. He also was selected to play in the USA Football International Bowl and the Blue-Grey All-America game in 2014.

== College career ==
Papale played college football at the University of Delaware. In his first season, he was one of only three true freshmen to see action, appearing in five games. His only statistic was a 28-yard reception. His one catch was the fourth-longest Delaware completion of the season. He made appearances against Lafayette, Villanova, William & Mary, Rhode Island, and New Hampshire.

In Papale's sophomore year, he started the first six games before suffering a season-ending injury against William & Mary. He recorded three catches for 42 yards in the season.

He played in all 11 games in 2017, amassing 15 receptions for 178 yards.

He had his best season during his senior year, with 36 catches for 618 yards and 6 touchdowns. He played in all 12 games. His best game came against Towson, where he had eight catches for 142 yards and two touchdowns.

== Professional career ==
Pre-draft measurables
Height	Weight	Arm length	Hand span	40-yard dash	10-yard split	20-yard split	20-yard shuttle	Three-cone drill	Vertical jump	Broad jump	Bench press
6 ft 0 1/8 in (1.83 m)	204 lb (93 kg)	30 in (0.76 m)	8 7/8 in (0.23 m)	4.58 s	1.65 s	2.72 s	4.39 s	7.46 s	32.5 in (0.83 m)	10 ft 4 in (3.15 m)	15 reps
All values from Pro Day

=== Montreal Alouettes ===
Following tryouts with the Oakland Raiders and Washington Redskins of the National Football League (NFL) in May 2019, he signed with the Montreal Alouettes of the Canadian Football League (CFL) in May 2020. The season was canceled due to the COVID-19 pandemic and he was released in October.

=== TSL Conquerors ===
Papale signed with the Conquerors of The Spring League in 2020. He previously had tryouts in the XFL. He remained with the Conquerors for the 2021 The Spring League season.

=== Tampa Bay Bandits ===
Papale was selected in the 17th round of the 2022 USFL draft by the Tampa Bay Bandits. He played in all 10 games, nine as a starter, and posted 19 receptions for 244 yards.

=== Memphis Showboats (first stint) ===
After the 2022 USFL season, Papale and all other Tampa Bay Bandits players were all transferred to the Memphis Showboats after it was announced that the Bandits were taking a hiatus and that the Showboats were joining the league. In the 2023 season, he played in all 10 games and totaled 33 receptions for 345 yards with three touchdowns. He was named to the All-USFL Team as a special teamer.

=== New Orleans Breakers ===
On October 25, 2023, Papale signed with the New Orleans Breakers. The Breakers folded when the XFL and USFL merged to create the United Football League (UFL).

=== Memphis Showboats (second stint) ===
On January 5, 2023, Papale was drafted by the Showboats during the 2024 UFL dispersal draft.

== Italian National Flag Football Team career ==
Vinny Papale is a wide receiver for the Italian National Flag Football Team. At the IFAF European Flag Football Championship 2025 in Paris, as leading scorer, he helped Italy beat Austria 27-19 to win gold

== Personal life ==
Vinny is the son of former Philadelphia Eagles receiver Vince Papale, whose career was the basis of the 2006 film Invincible.
