= Jalen Morton =

American football player (born 1997)

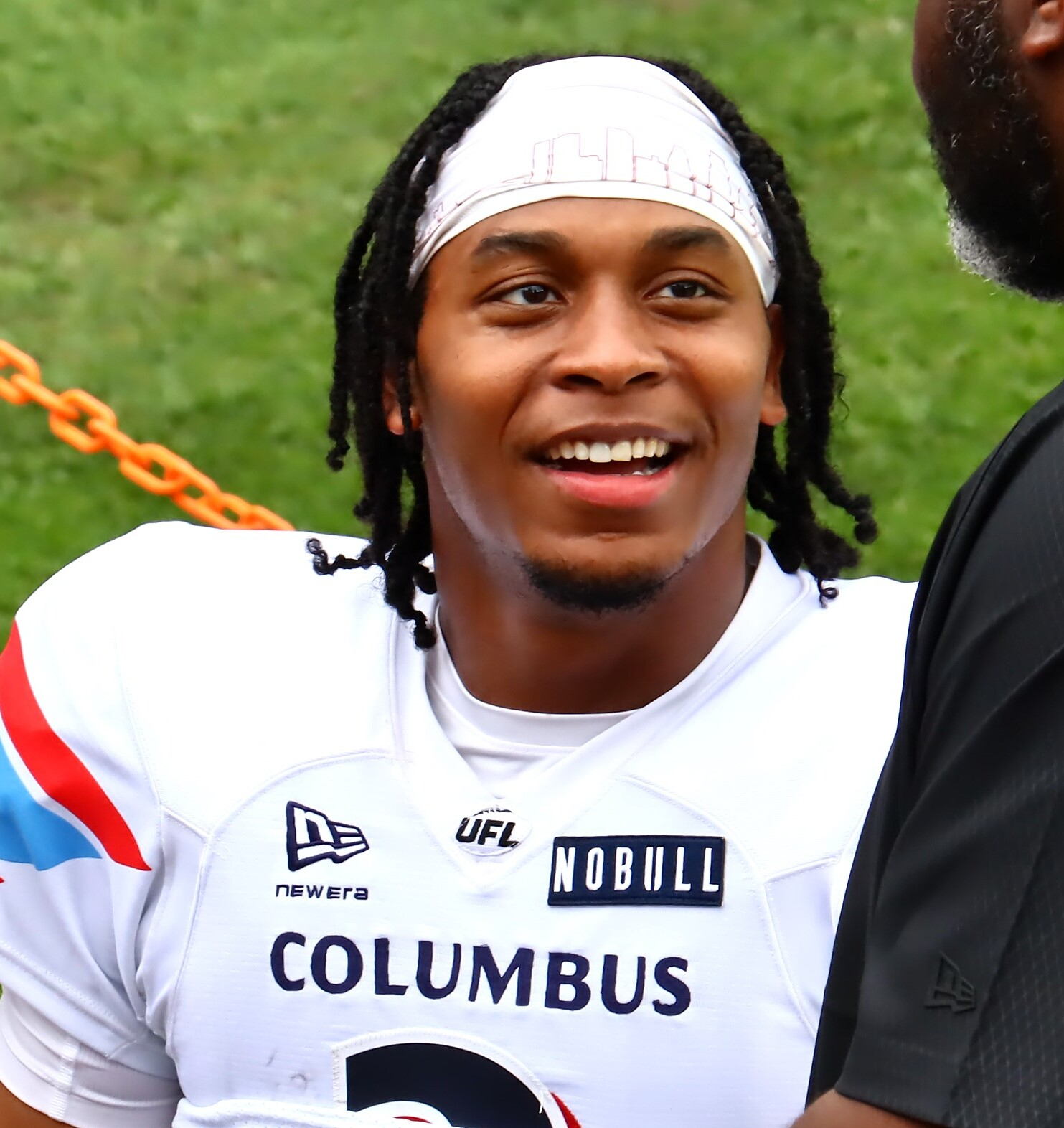
- Morton with the Columbus Aviators in 2026

No. 2 – Columbus Aviators
- Position: Quarterback
- Roster status: Active

Personal information
- Born: July 6, 1997 (age 29); Arlington, Texas, U.S.
- Listed height: 6 ft 4 in (1.93 m)
- Listed weight: 226 lb (103 kg)

Career information
- High school: Seguin (Arlington)
- College: Prairie View A&M
- NFL draft: 2020: undrafted

Career history
- Green Bay Packers (2020)*; Indianapolis Colts (2021)*; Hamilton Tiger-Cats (2021–2022); Birmingham Stallions (2023); Southwest Kansas Storm (2025); Birmingham Stallions (2025); Southwest Kansas Storm (2025); Columbus Aviators (2026–present)
- * Offseason or practice squad member only

Awards and highlights
- USFL champion (2023); AF1 Rookie of the Year (2025)
- Stats at Pro Football Reference

Jalen Morton (born July 6, 1997) is an American professional football quarterback for the Columbus Aviators of United Football League (UFL). He played college football at Prairie View A&M and went undrafted in the 2020 NFL draft. He played for the Hamilton Tiger-Cats of the Canadian Football League (CFL) from 2021 to 2022.

== Early life ==
Morton attended Seguin High School in Arlington, Texas. During his high school years, he passed for 1,041 yards and had 10 passing touchdowns.

=== College career ===
Morton appeared in one game his freshman season and retained his redshirt status. In 2016, Morton appeared in nine games with four starts. His first colligate start was against Rice, where he completed 18 of 29 passes for 278 yards and two touchdowns. He also ran for 47 yards and a touchdown in the 44–65 loss. In 2018, Morton ran for a school record 255 yards on just eight carries in a victory against Arkansas–Pine Bluff. He scored four rushing touchdowns while adding another two in the air.

=== Statistics ===
| Season | Team | Games | | | Passing | | | | | | | Rushing | | | |
| Season | Team | GP | GS | Record | Cmp | Att | Pct | Yds | TD | Int | Rtg | Att | Yds | Avg | TD |
|---|---|---|---|---|---|---|---|---|---|---|---|---|---|---|---|
| 2015 | Prairie View A&M | 1 | 0 | — | Redshirted (redshirt) | | | | | | | | | | |
| 2016 | Prairie View A&M | 9 | 4 | 2–2 | 72 | 146 | 49.3 | 945 | 8 | 7 | 112.2 | 58 | 190 | 3.3 | 6 |
| 2017 | Prairie View A&M | 6 | 0 | — | 8 | 17 | 47.1 | 107 | 1 | 0 | 119.3 | 8 | 65 | 8.1 | 0 |
| 2018 | Prairie View A&M | 11 | 11 | 5–6 | 170 | 327 | 52.0 | 2,344 | 18 | 12 | 123.0 | 130 | 874 | 6.7 | 10 |
| 2019 | Prairie View A&M | 8 | 8 | 3–5 | 122 | 205 | 59.5 | 1,841 | 15 | 10 | 149.3 | 74 | 450 | 6.1 | 6 |
| Career | | 35 | 23 | 10–13 | 372 | 695 | 53.5 | 5,237 | 42 | 29 | 128.4 | 270 | 1,579 | 5.9 | 22 |

== Professional career ==
Pre-draft measurables
| Height | Weight | Arm length | Hand span | Wingspan |
|---|---|---|---|---|
| 6 ft 3 in (1.91 m) | 237 lb (108 kg) | 33 7/8 in (0.86 m) | 10 1/2 in (0.27 m) | 6 ft 7 in (2.01 m) |
All values from HBCU Combine

=== Green Bay Packers ===
On April 27, 2020, Morton was signed as an undrafted free agent by the Green Bay Packers. He was released during the preseason summer training camp, on August 3.

=== Indianapolis Colts ===
On February 1, 2021, Morton signed a reserve/future contract with the Indianapolis Colts. On August 6, Morton was waived by the Colts.

=== Hamilton Tiger-Cats ===
Morton signed with the Hamilton Tiger-Cats of the Canadian Football League (CFL) on September 20, 2021. Following the 2021 season he re-signed on January 24, 2022. Morton got his first playing time at quarterback in Week 13 of the 2022 season after an injury to starting quarterback Dane Evans and backup Jamie Newman proved ineffective in his debut. Morton completed only two of six pass attempts for 13 yards and an interception as the Tiger-Cats were defeated 28–8 by their rivals the Toronto Argonauts, falling to last place in the East division. After spending majority of his time on practice roster in Hamilton, Morton was released November 7.

=== Birmingham Stallions ===
Morton signed with the Birmingham Stallions of the USFL on December 13, 2022, where he served as third-string quarterback behind Alex McGough and J'Mar Smith. On January 15, 2024, he was selected by the Stallions in the third round of the Super Draft portion of the 2024 UFL dispersal draft. Morton was released by Birmingham on March 10.

=== Southwest Kansas Storm ===
Morton signed with the Southwest Kansas Storm to begin the 2025 season, and was the team's starting quarterback.

=== Birmingham Stallions (second stint) ===
On May 6, 2025, Morton re-signed with the Birmingham Stallions of the United Football League (UFL). He was released by the Stallions on May 12.

=== Southwest Kansas Storm (second stint) ===
Morton returned to the Southwest Kansas Storm of Arena Football One after his six-day stint with the Stallions.

=== Houston Roughnecks ===
On August 29, 2025, Morton signed with the Houston Roughnecks of the United Football League.

=== Columbus Aviators ===
On January 12, 2026, Morton was allocated to the Columbus Aviators of the United Football League (UFL). Morton began the season as the primary backup to veteran Jalan McClendon. Through the first eight weeks of the season, he was utilized in designed rushing packages, with his first rushing touchdown coming against the St. Louis Battlehawks in Week 6. In Week 9, Morton made his first start for the Aviators, completing 14 of 30 passes for 213 yards, three touchdowns, and one interception while adding 96 rushing yards and a rushing touchdown in a 36–29 victory. After accounting for 309 total yards and four total touchdowns, he was named the UFL Offensive Player of the Week.

== Career statistics ==
=== CFL ===
| Year | Team | Games | | | Passing | | | | | | | | | Rushing | | | | |
| Year | Team | GP | GS | Record | Cmp | Att | Pct | Yds | Y/A | Lng | TD | Int | Rtg | Att | Yds | Avg | Lng | TD |
|---|---|---|---|---|---|---|---|---|---|---|---|---|---|---|---|---|---|---|
| 2022 | HAM | 4 | 0 | — | 2 | 6 | 33.3 | 13 | 2.2 | 9 | 0 | 1 | 2.8 | 5 | 14 | 2.8 | 9 | 0 |
| Career | | 4 | 0 | 0–0 | 2 | 6 | 33.3 | 13 | 2.2 | 9 | 0 | 1 | 2.8 | 5 | 14 | 2.8 | 9 | 0 |

=== USFL/UFL ===
| Year | Team | League | Games | | | Passing | | | | | | | | Rushing | | | |
| Year | Team | League | GP | GS | Record | Cmp | Att | Pct | Yds | Y/A | TD | Int | Rtg | Att | Yds | Avg | TD |
|---|---|---|---|---|---|---|---|---|---|---|---|---|---|---|---|---|---|
| 2023 | BHAM | USFL | 1 | 0 | — | 0 | 0 | 0.0 | 0 | 0.0 | 0 | 0 | 0.0 | 1 | 5 | 5.0 | 0 |
| 2025 | BHAM | UFL | 0 | 0 | — | DNP | | | | | | | | | | | |
| 2026 | CLB | UFL | 9 | 2 | 1–1 | 30 | 71 | 42.3 | 434 | 6.1 | 4 | 3 | 63.9 | 25 | 140 | 5.6 | 2 |
| Career | | | 9 | 2 | 1–1 | 30 | 71 | 42.3 | 434 | 6.1 | 4 | 3 | 63.9 | 26 | 145 | 5.6 | 2 |

=== AF1 ===
| Year | Team | Games | | | Passing | | | | | | | | | Rushing | | | | |
| Year | Team | GP | GS | Record | Cmp | Att | Pct | Yds | Y/A | Lng | TD | Int | Rtg | Att | Yds | Avg | Lng | TD |
|---|---|---|---|---|---|---|---|---|---|---|---|---|---|---|---|---|---|---|
| 2025 | SW KAN | 12 | 12 | 7–5 | 170 | 343 | 49.6 | 2,314 | 5.6 | 47 | 40 | 15 | 92.0 | 86 | 488 | 5.7 | 37 | 17 |
| Career | | 12 | 12 | 7–5 | 170 | 343 | 49.6 | 2,314 | 5.7 | 47 | 40 | 15 | 92.0 | 86 | 488 | 5.7 | 37 | 17 |
