= Lorenzo Burns =

American gridiron football player (born 1997)

- Burns with the Montreal Alouettes in 2026

No. 20 – Montreal Alouettes
- Position: Cornerback
- Roster status: Active
- CFL status: American

Personal information
- Born: October 10, 1997 (age 29); Murrieta, California, U.S.
- Listed height: 5 ft 11 in (1.80 m)
- Listed weight: 200 lb (91 kg)

Career information
- High school: Linfield Christian (Temecula, California)
- College: Arizona
- NFL draft: 2021: undrafted

Career history
- Arizona Cardinals (2021)*; Jacksonville Jaguars (2021)*; Birmingham Stallions (2022–2023); Cleveland Browns (2023)*; Birmingham Stallions (2023–2024); Montreal Alouettes (2024–present)
- * Offseason or practice squad member only

Awards and highlights
- UFL champion (2024); 2× USFL champion (2022, 2023); CFL East All-Star (2026)

Career CFL statistics as of 2026
- Total tackles: 148
- Pass deflections: 26
- Interceptions: 4
- Forced fumbles: 3
- Fumble recoveries: 1
- Stats at CFL.ca
- Stats at Pro Football Reference

Lorenzo Burns (born October 10, 1997) is an American professional football cornerback for the Montreal Alouettes of the Canadian Football League (CFL). Burns played college football for the Arizona Wildcats. He has also been a member of the Arizona Cardinals, Jacksonville Jaguars, Birmingham Stallions and the Cleveland Browns.

== College career ==
Burns was rated a three-star recruit coming out of high school. He played for the Arizona Wildcats of the University of Arizona from 2016 to 2020. Burns played in 42 games in his career and tallied 192 tackles, two sacks, nine interceptions, 35 passes defended and two fumble recoveries. Burns was a two-time All-Pac-12 Conference honorable mention in 2019 and 2020 and was named Defensive MVP in 2019.

== Professional career ==
Pre-draft measurables
Height	Weight	Arm length	Hand span	Wingspan	40-yard dash	10-yard split	20-yard split	20-yard shuttle	Three-cone drill	Vertical jump	Broad jump	Bench press
5 ft 10 3/8 in (1.79 m)	183 lb (83 kg)	30 1/4 in (0.77 m)	8 5/8 in (0.22 m)	6 ft 0 3/4 in (1.85 m)	4.56 s	1.62 s	2.60 s	4.51 s	7.55 s	33.5 in (0.85 m)	10 ft 3 in (3.12 m)	14 reps
All values from NFL Combine/Pro Day

=== Arizona Cardinals ===
After not being selected in the 2021 NFL draft, Burns signed with the Arizona Cardinals as an undrafted free agent. On July 23, he was placed on the Reserve/COVID-19 list. He was activated on August 5. Burns was waived from the team on August 7.

=== Jacksonville Jaguars ===
On August 8, Burns was claimed off waivers by the Jacksonville Jaguars. He was released as part of the final roster cuts on August 31 and was signed to the practice squad the following day. On January 1, 2022, Burns was activated from the Reserve/COVID-19 list to the active roster for a Week 17 game against the New England Patriots. He returned to the practice squad on January 3.

=== Birmingham Stallions (first stint) ===
Burns was selected by the Birmingham Stallions with the 86th pick in the 11th round of the 2022 USFL draft. He finished the season with nine tackles, two interceptions for 26 yards, one fumble recovery, and three pass breakups in eight games. He was part of the roster that won the 2022 USFL Championship.

In the 2023 season, recorded 26 tackles, two forced fumbles, and four pass deflections in nine games and started in four. In the championship game against the Pittsburgh Maulers, he made seven tackles including two tackles for loss, winning 28–12.

=== Cleveland Browns ===
On August 1, 2023, Burns was signed by the Cleveland Browns. On August 29, as part of final roster cuts, he was waived by the Browns. On August 30, he was signed to the practice squad. Burns was released from the Browns on September 12.

=== Birmingham Stallions (second stint) ===
On November 14, Burns was signed by the Stallions for the inaugural 2024 UFL season. He played in 11 games and finished with 32 tackles and six pass breakups, en route to a victory in the 2024 UFL Championship, his third consecutive spring football championship.

=== Montreal Alouettes ===
On September 9, 2024 Burns signed with the Montreal Alouettes to the practice squad. He made his Canadian Football League debut against the Ottawa Redblacks in a win with one tackle. Burns played in five games and finished with 18 tackles.

On October 26, 2026, Burns re-signed with the Alouettes to keep him with the team through the 2028 season.
