= Marlon Williams (American football) =

American football player (born 1999)

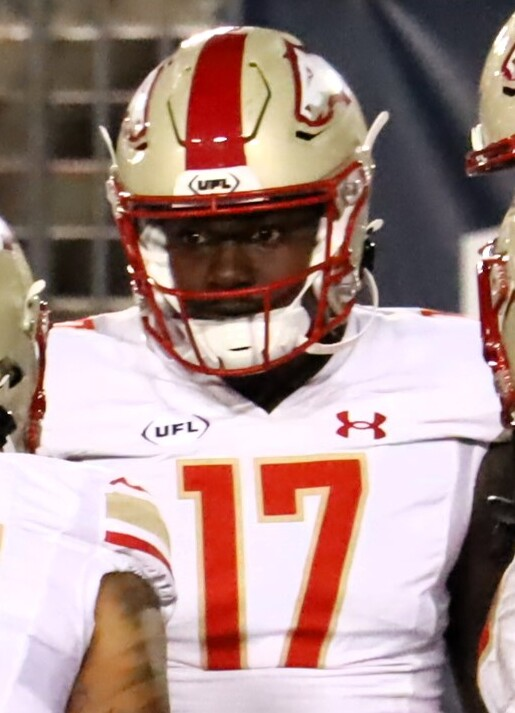
- Williams with the Birmingham Stallions in 2025

Profile
- Position: Wide receiver

Personal information
- Born: August 12, 1999 (age 27); Mobile, Alabama, U.S.
- Listed height: 5 ft 11 in (1.80 m)
- Listed weight: 224 lb (102 kg)

Career information
- High school: McGill–Toolen Catholic (Mobile, Alabama)
- College: UCF
- NFL draft: 2021: undrafted

Career history
- Houston Texans (2021)*; Birmingham Stallions (2022–2026)
- * Offseason or practice squad member only

Awards and highlights
- 2× USFL champion (2022, 2023); UFL champion (2024); Colley Matrix national champion (2017); First-team All-AAC (2020)
- Stats at Pro Football Reference

Marlon Williams (born August 12, 1999) is an American professional football wide receiver. He played college football at UCF. He signed with the Houston Texans as an undrafted free agent in 2021.

== Early life ==
Williams played wide receiver and return specialist at McGill–Toolen Catholic High School. He was ranked as the number 88 receiver in the country by 247Sports and a four-star recruit by ESPN.

== College career ==
After initially committing to the University of Southern California, Williams accepted a scholarship to the University of Central Florida. Williams played as a true freshman, appearing in all 13 games at receiver for the Knights. He caught 17 passes for 270 yards and two touchdowns, and also rushed for 54 yards on two attempts. He played in the 2017 American Athletic Conference Football Championship Game, where he caught three balls for 46 yards.

In his senior year, Williams was named to the All-AAC first team after leading the league and ranking fifth in the nation with 130 receiving yards per game. He ranked second in the conference and seventh in the nation with 10 receiving touchdowns. He was also second in the league and ninth in the nation with 1,039 receiving yards. Williams was a semifinalist for the Biletnikoff Award and earned Pro Football Focus third-team All-American honors.

Williams finished his career at UCF tied for ninth most career receptions in UCF history, 10th most receiving yards (2,260) in program history, and ninth most touchdown receptions (19) in program history.

== Professional career ==
Pre-draft measurables
Height	Weight	Arm length	Hand span	Wingspan	40-yard dash	10-yard split	20-yard split	20-yard shuttle	Vertical jump	Broad jump	Bench press
5 ft 11 1/4 in (1.81 m)	209 lb (95 kg)	31 in (0.79 m)	8 7/8 in (0.23 m)	6 ft 1 1/2 in (1.87 m)	4.66 s	1.65 s	2.62 s	4.57 s	33.5 in (0.85 m)	9 ft 11 in (3.02 m)	14 reps
All values from Pro Day

=== Houston Texans ===
Williams signed with the Houston Texans as an undrafted free agent on May 1, 2021. He was later cut at the start of training camp.

=== Birmingham Stallions ===
Williams signed with the New Birmingham Stallions of the United States Football League after being drafted in the 7th round of the inaugural 2022 USFL draft. Despite missing one game, Williams finished third in the league with 474 receiving yards and tied for the second-most receiving touchdowns in the league. In the 2022 USFL Championship Game, Williams had the longest reception of the season, a 65-yard touchdown. He finished the game with 105 receiving yards and one touchdown on seven receptions, ultimately helping the Stallions to the win.

Williams re-signed with the Stallions on July 18, 2023, and again on August 20, 2024.
