= 2024 UFL championship game =

American football championship game

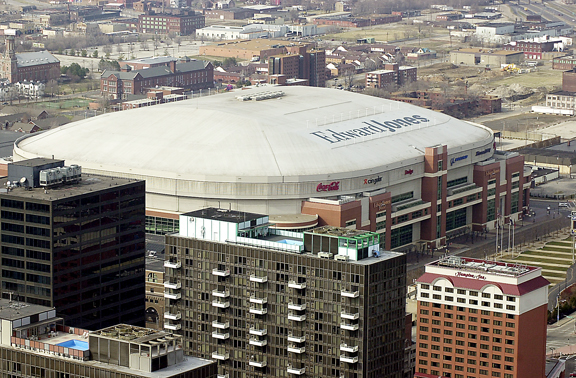
- The Dome at America's Center (pictured as Edward Jones Dome) where the game was played.
Birmingham Stallions (9–1)	San Antonio Brahmas (7–3)
25	0
Head coach: Skip Holtz	Head coach: Wade Phillips
	1	2	3	4	Total
BHAM	0	8	14	3	25
SA	0	0	0	0	0
- Date: June 16, 2024
- Kickoff time: 5:00 p.m. EDT (UTC-4)
- Stadium: The Dome at America's Center; St. Louis, Missouri
- MVP: Adrian Martinez, quarterback
- Favorite: Stallions by −3.5
- Referee: Adam Savoie
- Attendance: 27,396

Ceremonies
- National anthem: Charles Glenn
- Halftime show: Marquette King

TV in the United States
- Network: Fox
- Announcers: Curt Menefee (play-by-play), Joel Klatt (analyst) and Brock Huard (sideline reporter)
- Nielsen ratings: 0.8 (1.60 million viewers)

The 2024 UFL Championship Game was an American football game played on June 16, 2024, at The Dome at America's Center in St. Louis, Missouri. It was the very first United Bowl in the UFL. The contest determined the champion of the 2024 UFL season and was played between the USFL Conference title winners, the Birmingham Stallions, and the XFL Conference title winners, the San Antonio Brahmas. The Stallions won in a blowout of 25-0. The game began at 5:00 p.m. EDT and aired on Fox.

== Background ==
The championship game was the first UFL championship game following the merger of the XFL and the USFL. Before the merger, the USFL had two championship games, in 2022 and 2023, where the Birmingham Stallions defeated the Philadelphia Stars and the Pittsburgh Maulers in back-to-back seasons. The XFL held one championship game in 2023 when the Arlington Renegades defeated the DC Defenders. The two leagues merged before the 2024 season.

=== Host selection ===
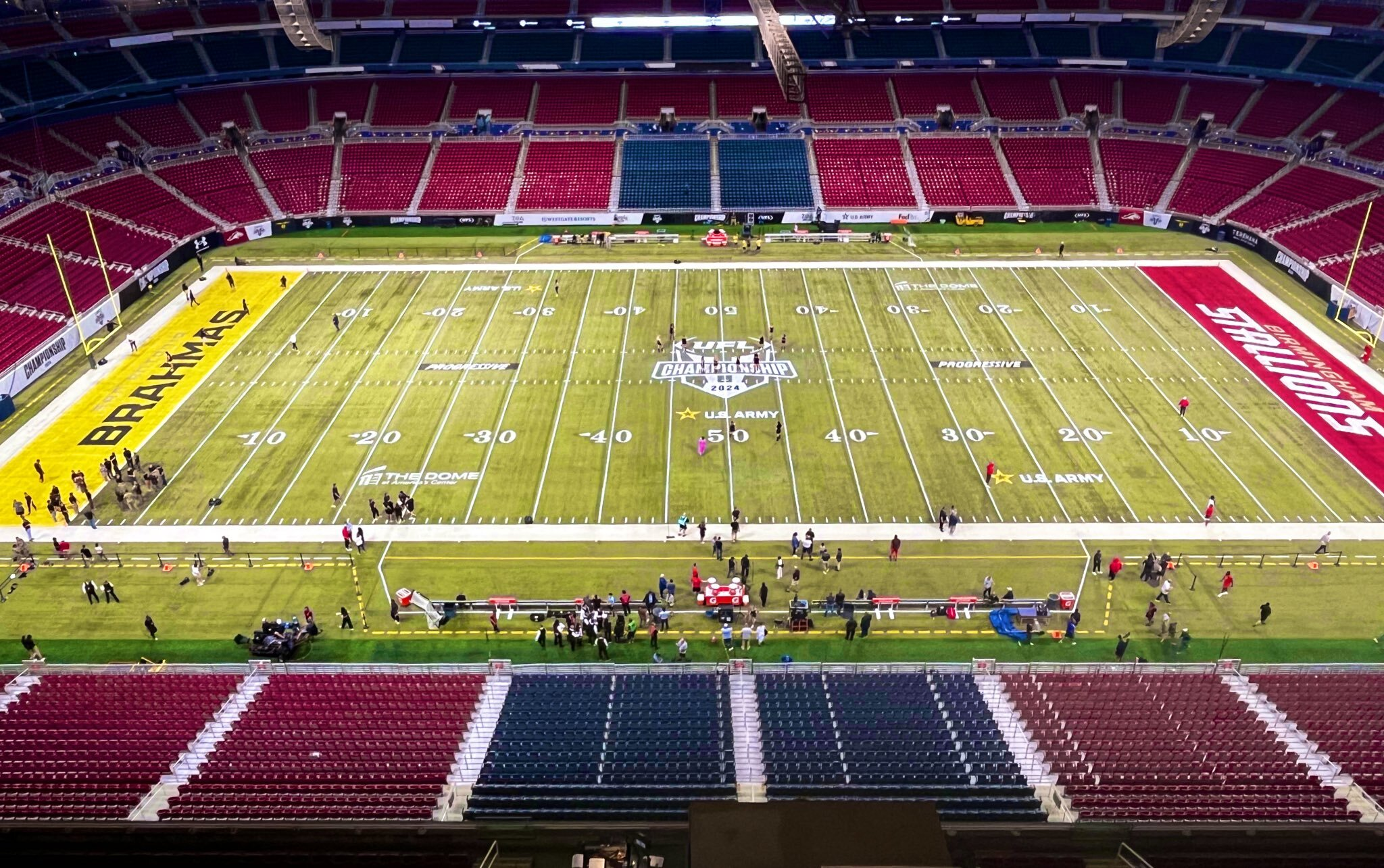
The Dome at America's Center prior to the 2024 UFL championship game on June 16, 2024

On March 14, 2024, The Dome at America's Center was selected as host for the first UFL championship. When discussing the selection, UFL President and CEO Russ Brandon said, "selecting the championship game location is more than just the stadium, but the community and the fanbase that surrounds it. This is why we are proud to bring our Championship to St. Louis – a city that has loved and embraced spring football from the start." St. Louis set the XFL's five highest league attendance records in 2023.

Of those known to have submitted competing bids, Tom Benson Hall of Fame Stadium in Canton, Ohio, host of the 2022 and 2023 USFL championship games, was known to have made an "aggressive" bid.

=== UFL playoffs ===
The four teams competing in the playoff clinched their spot during their regular season during different times of the overall season of the league. The top two placed teams in each division would face against each other for the division title. Whichever division title game team won, would then face the other champion from the other division in the UFL championship game.

==== Bracket ====
Conference finals June 8–9, 2024
USFL1	Birmingham Stallions	31
USFL2	Michigan Panthers	18
XFL1	St. Louis Battlehawks	15
XFL2	San Antonio Brahmas	25

UFL championship June 16, 2024
USFL1	Birmingham Stallions	25
XFL2	San Antonio Brahmas	0

== Teams ==
=== Birmingham Stallions ===
The Birmingham Stallions finished their third overall season under head coach Skip Holtz, going 9–1, their lone loss having occurred at the hands of San Antonio in week 9. The Stallions advanced to the USFL Conference championship against the Michigan Panthers, in which they rallied from an 18–3 second quarter deficit, scoring the final 28 points in a 31–18 victory to secure their third consecutive USFL title.

Birmingham made their third consecutive spring football championship game appearance, winning both of the USFL championships as part of the original rebooted league over the Philadelphia Stars in 2022 and the Pittsburgh Maulers in 2023.

=== San Antonio Brahmas ===
The San Antonio Brahmas finished their second overall season and their first season under head coach Wade Phillips, going 7–3 and advancing to the XFL Conference championship against the St. Louis Battlehawks. The Brahmas led wire-to-wire behind a rushing attack that amassed over 200 yards, upsetting the Battlehawks on their home field, 25–15, to secure their first-ever XFL Conference championship.

San Antonio was the second consecutive Texas-based team to appear in a spring football championship game, following the Arlington Renegades winning the 2023 XFL title as part of that rebooted league. Wade Phillips was also seeking his first outright championship as a head coach, having won Super Bowl 50 with the Denver Broncos as their defensive coordinator in 2015.

== Game summary ==
=== Scoring summary ===
2024 UFL championship game

Quarter	1	2	3	4	Total
Birmingham Stallions	0	8	14	3	25
San Antonio Brahmas	0	0	0	0	0

at The Dome at America's Center • St. Louis, Missouri

- Date: Sunday, June 16, 2024
- Game time: 5:00 p.m. EDT
- Game weather: Indoor stadium
- Game attendance: 27,396
- Referee: Adam Savoie
- TV announcers (Fox): Curt Menefee (play-by-play), Joel Klatt (analyst) and Brock Huard (sideline reporter)

Game information

First quarter

- No scoring plays.

Second quarter

- BHAM – Gary Jennings Jr. 8-yard pass from Adrian Martinez (Adrian Martinez-Amari Rodgers two-point pass), :50. Stallions 8–0. Drive: 6 plays, 87 yards, 2:59.

Third quarter

- BHAM – Adrian Martinez 11-yard run (Adrian Martinez-Jordan Thomas two-point pass), 11:00. Stallions 16–0. Drive: 8 plays, 59 yards, 4:00.
- BHAM – Adrian Martinez 1-yard run (two-point pass failed), 7:25. Stallions 22–0. Drive: 6 plays, 24 yards, 3:17.

Fourth quarter

- BHAM – Chris Blewitt 49-yard field goal, 11:25. Stallions 25–0. Drive: 9 plays, 22 yards, 4:33.

Top passers

- BHAM – Adrian Martinez – 13/23, 98 yards, TD
- SA – Chase Garbers – 18/26, 116 yards

Top rushers

- BHAM – Ricky Person Jr. – 13 rushes, 102 yards
- SA – Anthony McFarland Jr. – 9 rushes, 32 yards

Top receivers

- BHAM – Marlon Williams – 4 receptions, 36 yards
- SA – Anthony McFarland Jr. – 6 receptions, 38 yards

== Statistics ==
Team statistical comparison
Statistic	Birmingham	San Antonio
Total plays–net yards	58–308	53–208
Rushing attempts–net yards	35–210	16–52
Yards per rush	6.0	3.2
Yards passing	98	156
Pass completions–attempts	13–23	24–35
Interceptions thrown	0	0
Punt returns–total yards	15	18
Kickoff returns–total yards	30	77
Punts–average yardage	4–49.0	6–47.3
Fumbles–lost	1–1	3–2
Time of possession	31:10	28:50

Birmingham statistics
Stallions passing
	C–A	Yds	TD–INT
Adrian Martinez	13–23	98	1–0
Stallions rushing
	Car	Yds	TD
Ricky Person Jr.	13	102	0
Adrian Martinez	11	52	2
C. J. Marable	10	45	0
Amari Rodgers	1	11	0
Stallions receiving
	Rec	Yds	TD
Marlon Williams	4	36	0
Jace Sternberger	4	19	0
Gary Jennings Jr.	2	19	1
Jordan Thomas	1	14	0
Deon Cain	1	6	0
Ricky Person Jr.	1	4	0

San Antonio statistics
Brahmas passing
	C–A	Yds	TD–INT
Chase Garbers	18–26	116	0–0
Quinten Dormady	6–9	58	0–0
Brahmas rushing
	Car	Yds	TD
Anthony McFarland Jr.	9	32	0
Morgan Ellison	3	11	0
Chase Garbers	3	7	0
John Lovett	1	2	0
Brahmas receiving
	Rec	Yds	TD
Calvin Turner	5	49	0
Anthony McFarland Jr.	6	38	0
Marquez Stevenson	3	34	0
K. D. Cannon	2	26	0
Jontre Kirklin	5	23	0
Justin Smith	1	3	0
Alizé Mack	2	1	0

== Broadcasting ==
Fox carried the championship, with its lead team of play-by-play broadcaster Curt Menefee, analyst Joel Klatt and sideline reporter Brock Huard, along with a guest appearance from Tom Brady, in a preview of his assumption of lead NFL analyst duties in September.

A Spanish language broadcast was carried on Fox Deportes, with Jamie Motta and Jorge Carlos Mercader as the broadcast team.

== Entertainment ==
Charles Glenn, the anthem singer for the St. Louis Blues, performed the national anthem.

Marquette King, a former St. Louis Battlehawk who currently plays for the Arlington Renegades, performed the halftime show.

== See also ==
- UFL Championship Game
- USFL Championship Game
- XFL Championship Game
