= USFL Most Valuable Player Award =

USFL MVP list

- Sport: American football
- League: United States Football League
- Awarded for: Best performing player in regular season of the United States Football League

History
- First award: 2022
- Most wins: KaVontae Turpin and Alex McGough (1)
- Most recent: Alex McGough, Birmingham Stallions (2023)

The United States Football League Most Valuable Player Award (MVP) was an annual United States Football League (USFL) award given starting in the 2022 season to the best performing player of the regular season. The inaugural recipient of the award was KaVontae Turpin of the New Jersey Generals.

== Winners ==
Season	Player	Position	Nationality	Team
2022	KaVontae Turpin	Wide receiver	United States	New Jersey Generals
2023	Alex McGough	Quarterback	United States	Birmingham Stallions

== Teams ==
1	Birmingham Stallions	2023
1	New Jersey Generals	2022
0	Houston Gamblers	None
0	Memphis Showboats	None
0	Michigan Panthers	None
0	New Orleans Breakers	None
0	Philadelphia Stars	None
0	Pittsburgh Maulers	None
0	Tampa Bay Bandits	None
