= Hercules Mataʻafa =

American football player (born 1995)

No. 51
- Position: Defensive end

Personal information
- Born: September 18, 1995 (age 31); Lahaina, Hawaii, U.S.
- Listed height: 6 ft 2 in (1.88 m)
- Listed weight: 254 lb (115 kg)

Career information
- High school: Lahainaluna (Lahaina)
- College: Washington State
- NFL draft: 2018: undrafted

Career history
- Minnesota Vikings (2018–2020); Washington Football Team (2021)*; Jacksonville Jaguars (2021)*; New Jersey Generals (2022–2023); Birmingham Stallions (2024)*
- * Offseason or practice squad member only

Awards and highlights
- USFL forced fumbles co-leader (2023); Polynesian College Football Player of the Year (2017); Consensus All-American (2017); Pac-12 Defensive Player of The Year (2017); First-team All-Pac-12 (2017); Second-team All-Pac-12 (2016)

Career NFL statistics
- Total tackles: 25
- Sacks: 2.5
- Fumble recoveries: 1
- Stats at Pro Football Reference

Hercules Mataʻafa (born September 18, 1995) is an American former professional football player who was a defensive end in the National Football League (NFL). He played college football for the Washington State Cougars, earning consensus All-American honors in 2017. He signed as an undrafted free agent with the Minnesota Vikings in 2018.

== College career ==
Mataʻafa attended and played college football at Washington State University. As a junior in 2017, Mataʻafa was a consensus All-American and was named the Polynesian College Football Player of the Year. He was also named the Pac-12 Defensive Player of the Year by the Associated Press. On December 31, 2017, Mataʻafa declared his intentions to enter the 2018 NFL draft.

== Professional career ==
Pre-draft measurables
| Height | Weight | Arm length | Hand span | Wingspan | 40-yard dash | 10-yard split | 20-yard split | 20-yard shuttle | Three-cone drill | Vertical jump | Broad jump | Bench press |
|---|---|---|---|---|---|---|---|---|---|---|---|---|
| 6 ft 2 1/4 in (1.89 m) | 254 lb (115 kg) | 31 1/2 in (0.80 m) | 10 1/4 in (0.26 m) | 6 ft 4 1/8 in (1.93 m) | 4.76 s | 1.64 s | 2.76 s | 4.37 s | 7.24 s | 31.5 in (0.80 m) | 9 ft 0 in (2.74 m) | 26 reps |
All values from NFL Combine

=== Minnesota Vikings ===
Mataʻafa signed with the Minnesota Vikings as an undrafted free agent on April 30, 2018. However, on June 6, he suffered a season-ending injury to his ACL. He was waived/injured on June 20, 2018, and was placed on injured reserve after clearing waivers. He was signed back to the Vikings for the 2019 preseason. He managed to make the final roster coming out of training camp. On September 15, 2019, in his NFL debut, he recovered an Aaron Rodgers fumble in a loss to the Packers.

Mataʻafa was waived by the Vikings on October 13, 2020, and re-signed to the practice squad two days later. He was elevated to the active roster on October 31 for the team's Week 8 game against the Green Bay Packers, and reverted to the practice squad after the game. He was promoted to the active roster on November 6, 2020.

On August 31, 2021, Mataʻafa was waived by the Vikings.

=== Washington Football Team ===
The Washington Football Team signed Mataʻafa to their practice squad on December 14, 2021. He was released on December 22.

=== Jacksonville Jaguars ===
On December 28, 2021, Mataʻafa was signed to the Jacksonville Jaguars practice squad, but was released six days later.

=== New Jersey Generals ===
Mataʻafa signed with the New Jersey Generals of the United States Football League on May 19, 2022. He re-signed with the Generals on October 11, 2023. The Generals folded when the XFL and USFL merged to create the United Football League (UFL).

=== Birmingham Stallions ===
On January 5, 2024, Mataʻafa was selected by the Birmingham Stallions during the 2024 UFL dispersal draft. He signed with the team on February 28. Mataʻafa was released on March 10.
