= Amari Rodgers =

American football player (born 1999)

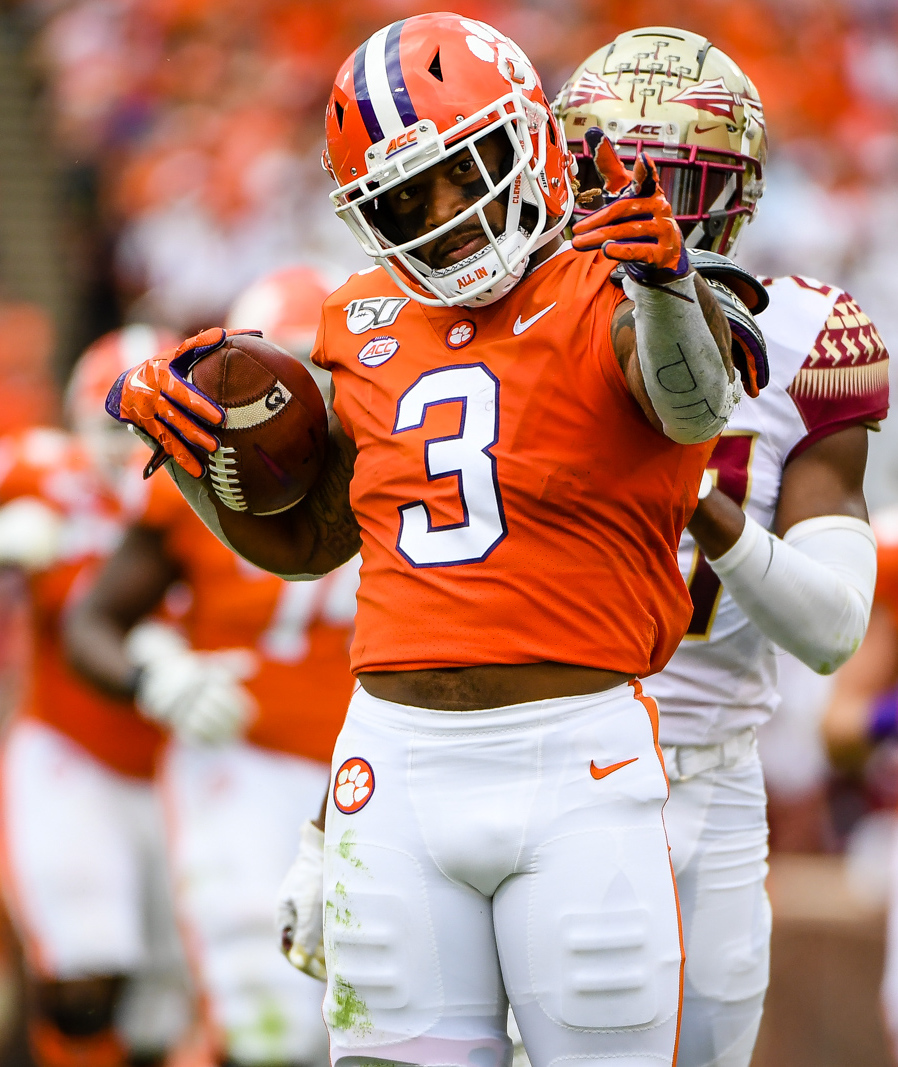
- Rodgers with the Clemson Tigers in 2019

Profile
- Position: Wide receiver

Personal information
- Born: September 23, 1999 (age 27); Knoxville, Tennessee, U.S.
- Listed height: 5 ft 9 in (1.75 m)
- Listed weight: 212 lb (96 kg)

Career information
- High school: Knoxville Catholic
- College: Clemson (2017–2020)
- NFL draft: 2021: 3rd round, 85th overall pick

Career history
- Green Bay Packers (2021–2022); Houston Texans (2022); Indianapolis Colts (2023); Birmingham Stallions (2024–2025)

Awards and highlights
- UFL champion (2024); CFP national champion (2018); First-team All-ACC (2020)

Career NFL statistics
- Receptions: 20
- Receiving yards: 249
- Rushing yards: 18
- Return yards: 626
- Total touchdowns: 1
- Stats at Pro Football Reference

Amari Jai Rodgers (born September 23, 1999) is an American professional football wide receiver. He played college football at Clemson and was selected by the Green Bay Packers in the third round of the 2021 NFL draft. He has also played for the Houston Texans and Indianapolis Colts, and in the United Football League for the Birmingham Stallions.

== Early life ==
Rodgers attended Knoxville Catholic High School in Knoxville, Tennessee. As a senior, he caught 40 passes for 1,238 yards with 18 touchdowns. For his career, he had 3,498 receiving yards with 47 total touchdowns. He was rated as a four star recruit and the 16th highest rated wide receiver recruit in the country by the 247Sports.com Composite, which aggregates the ratings of the major recruiting services. Rodgers originally committed to University of Southern California, but flipped to Clemson when they gave him an offer late in the season.

== College career ==
As a freshman at Clemson in 2017, Rodgers had 19 receptions for 123 yards. As a sophomore in 2018, he caught 55 passes for 575 yards and 4 touchdowns. He also returned a punt for a touchdown.

Rodgers missed the first game of his junior season in 2019 due to an ACL tear in spring practice. He finished the season with 30 receptions, 426 yards, and 4 touchdowns. After the season, Rodgers announced he was returning for his senior season rather than entering the 2020 NFL draft. As a senior, Rodgers caught 77 passes for 1,020 yards and 7 touchdowns.

== Professional career ==
Pre-draft measurables
Height	Weight	Arm length	Hand span	40-yard dash	10-yard split	20-yard split	20-yard shuttle	Three-cone drill	Vertical jump	Broad jump	Bench press
5 ft 9 1/2 in (1.77 m)	212 lb (96 kg)	30 3/8 in (0.77 m)	9 1/2 in (0.24 m)	4.52 s	1.65 s	2.62 s	4.31 s	7.07 s	33.0 in (0.84 m)	10 ft 1 in (3.07 m)	19 reps
All values from Pro Day

=== Green Bay Packers ===
Rodgers was selected by the Green Bay Packers in the third round with the 85th overall pick of the 2021 NFL draft. The Packers send their 92nd and 135th overall picks to the Tennessee Titans to move up and select Rodgers. He signed his four-year rookie contract on July 23, 2021, worth $4.89 million, including a $923,000 signing bonus. He saw his first NFL action on September 12, 2021, against the New Orleans Saints, recording one catch for 19 yards in the 38–3 loss. He finished the 2021 season with 169 yards off punt returns and 199 yards off kickoff returns with his longest being 23 and 27 yards.

During Rodgers' second season, he proved to be inconsistent, totaling five fumbled punt returns over ten games. However, he was otherwise more efficient by nearing his 2021 totals in just over half a season, returning 139 yards off punt returns and 122 off kickoffs through week 10. In a week 10 win over the Dallas Cowboys, Rodgers lost his seventh fumble during a punt return, and was benched afterwards, replaced by cornerback Keisean Nixon. Head coach Matt LaFleur announced they would no longer ask Rodgers to return punts, and he was released by the Packers two days after the game. Meanwhile, in his stead, Nixon was named a First-Team All-Pro as a kick returner, having tallied the most return yards in the NFL despite not winning the job until Week 10.

=== Houston Texans ===
The Houston Texans claimed Rodgers off waivers on November 16, 2022. On December 11, Rodgers scored his first career touchdown on a 28–yard reception from Jeff Driskel. Rodgers finished the 2022 season with 16 receptions for 204 receiving yards and one receiving touchdown.

On July 30, 2023, Rodgers was waived by the Houston Texans.

=== Indianapolis Colts ===
On August 2, 2023, Rodgers signed with the Indianapolis Colts. He was waived on August 29, 2023, and re-signed to the practice squad. On October 3, Rodgers was signed to the active roster. He was waived on October 20, 2023.

=== Birmingham Stallions ===
On December 22, 2023, Rodgers signed with the Birmingham Stallions of the United States Football League (USFL). He re-signed with the team on September 23, 2024.

Rodgers had been left unprotected in the 2026 UFL draft and claimed by the Columbus Aviators. Refusing to report to the Aviators, Rodgers instead announced his retirement on January 14, 2026, joining several of his Stallions teammates who had severed ties with the UFL that offseason.

== NFL career statistics ==
=== Regular season ===
Year	Team	Games		Receiving					Kick returns					Punt returns					Fumbles	
Year	Team	GP	GS	Rec	Yds	Avg	Lng	TD	Ret	Yds	Avg	Lng	TD	Ret	Yds	Avg	Lng	TD	Fum	Lost
2021	GB	16	1	4	45	11.2	19	0	11	199	18.1	27	0	20	166	8.3	23	0	2	0
2022	GB	10	0	4	50	12.5	22	0	6	122	20.3	34	0	20	139	7.0	20	0	5	2
2022	HOU	6	1	12	154	12.8	37	1	0	0	0.0	0	0	0	0	0.0	0	0	1	0
Total		32	2	20	249	12.5	37	1	17	321	18.9	34	0	40	305	7.6	23	0	8	2
Source: pro-football-reference.com

=== Postseason ===
Year	Team	Games		Receiving					Kick returns					Punt returns					Fumbles	
Year	Team	GP	GS	Rec	Yds	Avg	Lng	TD	Ret	Yds	Avg	Lng	TD	Ret	Yds	Avg	Lng	TD	Fum	Lost
2021	GB	1	0	0	0	0.0	0	0	3	66	22.0	26	0	2	11	5.5	6	0	0	0
Total		1	0	0	0	0.0	0	0	3	66	22.0	26	0	2	11	5.5	6	0	0	0
Source: pro-football-reference.com

== Personal life ==
Rodgers is the son of football coach Tee Martin. He is close friends with former Packers teammate Randall Cobb, whom he met while Cobb was playing for Martin at the University of Kentucky.
