= Steven Smith (American football coach) =

American football player and coach (born 1976)

Texas Southern Tigers
- Title: Offensive coordinator & offensive line coach

Personal information
- Born: December 28, 1976 (age 49); Chicago, Illinois, U.S.

Career information
- College: Langston (1994); Southern Illinois (1995–1998)
- NFL draft: 1999: undrafted

Career history
- Virginia State (2001) Quarterbacks coach; Detroit Fury (2003–2004) Offensive line coach & defensive line coach; Frankfurt Galaxy (2005) Running backs coach; Rhein Fire (2006) Offensive line coach; Kansas City Chiefs (2012) Assistant offensive line coach; Albany State (2013–2016) Offensive coordinator; Lincoln (MO) (2017–2018) Head coach; Seattle Dragons (2020) Offensive line coach; New Jersey Generals (2022–2023) Offensive coordinator & offensive line coach; Texas Southern (2024–present) Offensive coordinator & offensive line coach

Awards and highlights
- SBN National Championship (2010); 2× Gulf South Champs (2007, 2008); 2× SIAC Champs (2010, 2013)

Head coaching record
- Regular season: 4–17 (.190)
- Postseason: 0–0 (–)
- Career: 4–17 (.190)

Steven Smith (born December 18, 1976) is an American football coach who serves as the offensive coordinator and offensive line coach at Texas Southern, positions he has held since 2024. He was the head football coach at Lincoln University in Jefferson City, Missouri, a position he held from December 2017 to May 2019. Smith previously served in a variety coaching roles at different levels of football, including a stint as assistant offensive line coach for the 2012 Kansas City Chiefs of the National Football League (NFL) under head coach Romeo Crennel. In 2019, he became the offensive line coach for the Seattle Dragons of the XFL. In March 2022, Smith was announced as the offensive coordinator and offensive line coach for head coach Mike Riley and the New Jersey Generals.

== Head coaching record ==
Year	Team	Overall	Conference	Standing	Bowl/playoffs
Lincoln Blue Tigers (Great Lakes Valley Conference) (2017–2018)
2017	Lincoln	1–9	0–7	8th	
2018	Lincoln	3–8	2–5	6th	
Lincoln:		4–17	2–12		
Total:		4–17			
