= Darius Victor =

Liberian gridiron football player (born 1994)

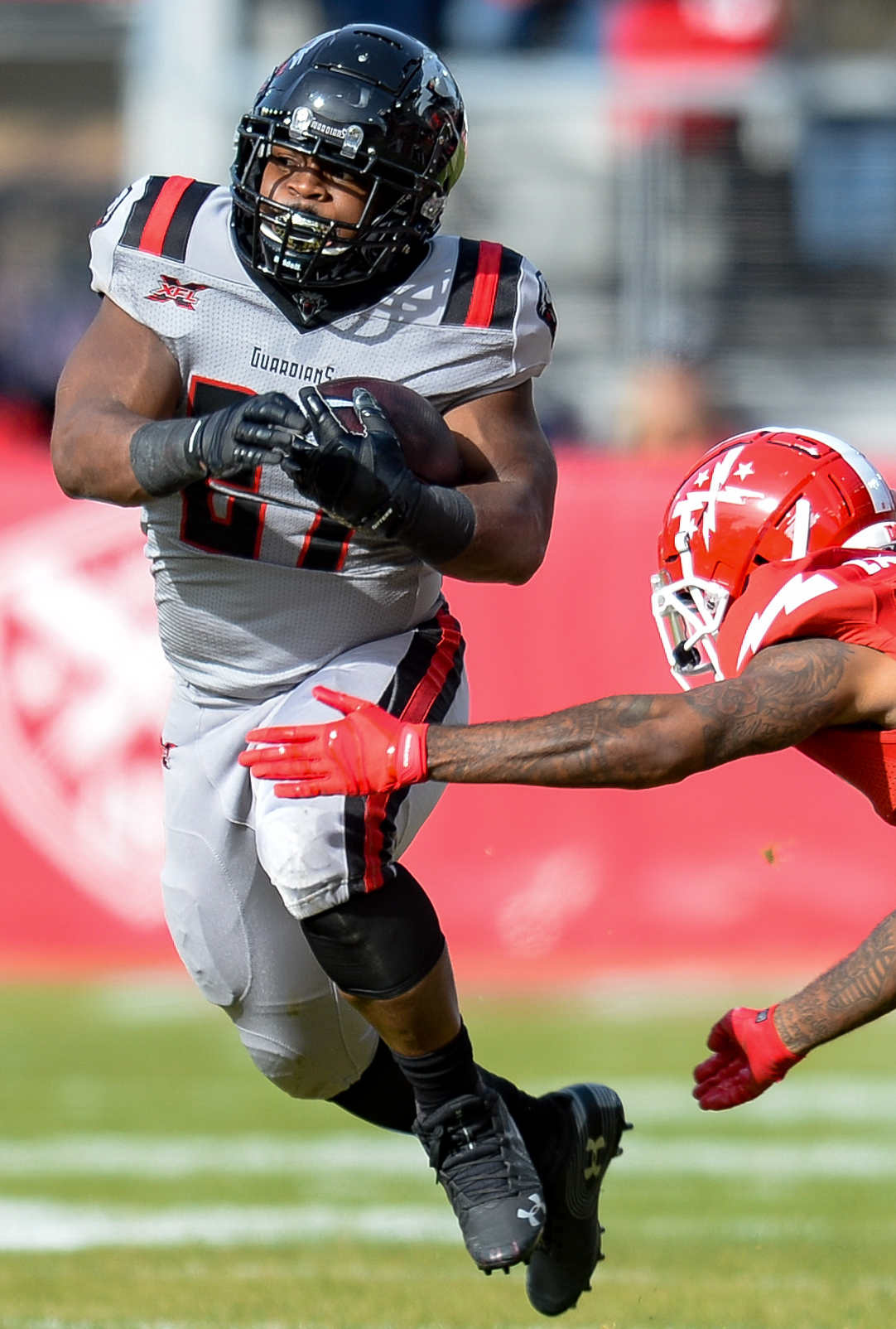
- Victor with the New York Guardians in 2020

No. 27
- Position: Running back

Personal information
- Born: March 6, 1994 (age 32); Ivory Coast
- Listed height: 5 ft 7 in (1.70 m)
- Listed weight: 230 lb (104 kg)

Career information
- High school: Northwestern (Hyattsville, Maryland, U.S.)
- College: Towson
- NFL draft: 2017: undrafted

Career history
- New Orleans Saints (2017)*; Arizona Cardinals (2017–2018)*; Hamilton Tiger-Cats (2019)*; New York Guardians (2020); New Jersey Generals (2022–2023); Memphis Showboats (2024)
- * Offseason or practice squad member only

Awards and highlights
- UFL Sportsman of the Year (2024); USFL Offensive Player of the Year (2022); All-USFL Team (2022); USFL rushing touchdowns leader (2022); First-team All-CAA (2014); Second-team All-CAA (2015); CAA Rookie of the Year(2013)

Career spring football statistics
- Rushing attempts: 388
- Rushing yards: 1,760
- Yards per carries: 4.4
- touchdowns: 17
- Receptions: 67
- Receiving yards: 480
- Receiving touchdowns: 4

Darius Vito Victor (born 6 March 1994) is a Liberian former professional American football running back. He played college football at Towson University. Victor was named 2022 Offensive Player of the Year of the United States Football League (USFL) as a member of the New Jersey Generals.

== Early life ==
Victor was born to Liberian parents as one of seven children in a refugee camp in the Ivory Coast after their parents fled the First Liberian Civil War. He lived there until 1999, when his family immigrated to the United States.

Victor attended Northwestern High School in Hyattsville, Maryland. As a senior, Victor was the leading rusher in the state of Maryland, with 2,107 yards and 31 touchdowns. His efforts would be rewarded with all-state honors. During his time at Northwestern, Victor also played basketball and ran track. Despite his success in high school, Victor was only ranked a 2-star recruit (73) by 247Sports.

== College career ==
Victor attended Towson University in Towson, Maryland. As a true freshman in 2013, Victor found success as the backup to record-breaking running back Terrance West. He made his debut at North Carolina Central and ran for 53 yards and two touchdowns on six carries. Victor would go on to appear in 14 games his first year, amassing 629 yards and seven touchdowns on 98 carries. Following the season, he was named the CAA Offensive Rookie of the Year.

With Terrance West departing for the NFL, Victor saw his workload increase in 2014. Despite the Tigers' rough 4-8 season, he was able to gain 1,305 yards and 12 touchdowns on 250 carries. Victor averaged 108.8 yards a game and scored a touchdown in 9 of the team's 12 games. He finished his college career with more than 3,300 yards and 41 touchdowns.

Throughout his career at Towson, Johnny Unitas Stadium played part of his brother's song about him each time he got a carry called "VITO".

=== College ===
College statistics
Season	Rushing				Receiving			
Season	Att	Yards	Avg	TD	Rec	Yards	Avg	TD
2013	98	629	6.4	7	5	71	14.2	1
2014	250	1,305	5.2	12	6	25	4.2	0
2015	240	1,210	4.9	17	7	42	6.0	0
2016	82	354	4.3	7	2	3	1.5	0
Total	637	3,309	5.2	41	20	141	7.1	1

== Professional career ==
Pre-draft measurables
Height	Weight	Arm length	Hand span	40-yard dash	10-yard split	20-yard split	20-yard shuttle	Three-cone drill	Vertical jump	Broad jump	Bench press
5 ft 7 1/8 in (1.70 m)	227 lb (103 kg)	28 3/8 in (0.72 m)	9 in (0.23 m)	4.57 s	1.50 s	2.59 s	4.55 s	7.28 s	37.5 in (0.95 m)	9 ft 9 in (2.97 m)	25 reps

=== New Orleans Saints ===
Victor declared for the 2017 NFL draft, but he was not drafted. He later attended the New Orleans Saints' rookie minicamp. On August 1, 2017, Victor signed with the Saints. He was waived on September 2, 2017.

=== Arizona Cardinals ===
On November 29, 2017, Victor was signed to the Arizona Cardinals' practice squad. He signed a reserve/future contract with the Cardinals on January 2, 2018.

On May 1, 2018, Victor was waived by the Cardinals. He was re-signed on August 28, 2018. He was waived on September 1, 2018.

=== Hamilton Tiger-Cats ===
In February 2019, Victor was signed by Hamilton Tiger-Cats. He was released on April 30, 2019, between mini-camp and before start of main training camp.

=== New York Guardians ===
In October 2019, Victor was selected by the New York Guardians in the 2020 XFL draft. He had his contract terminated when the league suspended operations on April 10, 2020.

=== New Jersey Generals ===
Victor was drafted by the New Jersey Generals of the United States Football League. He was named to the All-USFL team following the season and was named the 2022 United States Football League Offensive Player of the Year after leading the league with nine touchdown runs.

On July 19, 2022, Victor worked out with the New Orleans Saints, but no deal was made.

Victor re-signed with the Generals on July 12, 2023. The Generals folded when the XFL and USFL merged to create the United Football League (UFL).

=== Memphis Showboats ===
On January 5, 2024, Victor was drafted by the Memphis Showboats during the 2024 UFL dispersal draft.
