= KaVontae Turpin =

American football player (born 1996)

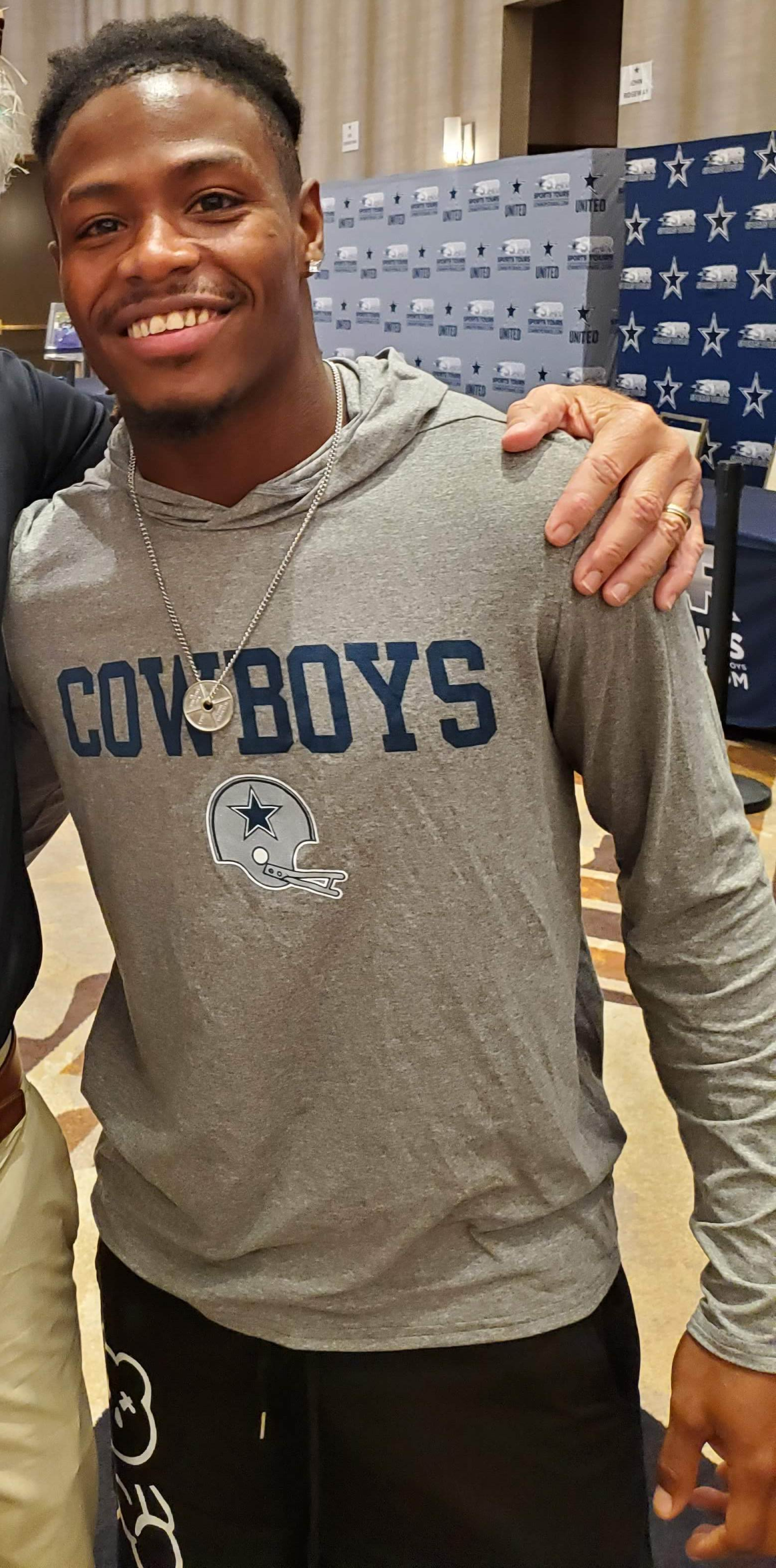
- Turpin in 2022

No. 9 – Dallas Cowboys
- Position: Wide receiver / Return specialist
- Roster status: Active

Personal information
- Born: August 2, 1996 (age 30); Monroe, Louisiana, U.S.
- Listed height: 5 ft 7 in (1.70 m)
- Listed weight: 158 lb (72 kg)

Career information
- High school: Neville
- College: TCU (2015–2018)
- NFL draft: 2019: undrafted

Career history
- Frisco Fighters (2020); FCF Glacier Boyz (2021); Panthers Wrocław (2021); New Jersey Generals (2022); Dallas Cowboys (2022–present)

Awards and highlights
- First-team All-Pro (2024) (Note: Selected as a kick returner); Second-team All-Pro (2025) (Note: Selected as a kick returner); 3× Pro Bowl (2022, 2024, 2025) (Note: Selected as a return specialist); 2× NFL kickoff return yards leader (2024, 2025); USFL Most Valuable Player (2022); All-USFL Team (2022) (Note: Selected as a wide receiver and punt returner); USFL receiving yards leader (2022); Freshman All-American (2015) (Note: Selected as a kick returner); First-team All-Big 12 (2017) (Note: Selected as a all-purpose / return specialist)

Career NFL statistics as of Week 10, 2026
- Receptions: 75
- Receiving yards: 1,001
- Receiving touchdowns: 7
- Rushing yards: 327
- Rushing touchdowns: 2
- Return yards: 4,824
- Return touchdowns: 3
- Stats at Pro Football Reference

KaVontae Lamon Turpin (born August 2, 1996) is an American professional football wide receiver and return specialist for the Dallas Cowboys of the National Football League (NFL). He played college football for the TCU Horned Frogs. Weighing just 154 pounds, Turpin is the lightest active NFL player.

Turpin joined the New Jersey Generals for the 2022 USFL season. He was the USFL MVP for the season. He played in the European League of Football for the Wroclaw Panthers from Poland in 2021.

Turpin led the NFL in kick return yards in 2025 with 1,814 yards, the second most in a season in NFL history.

== Early life ==
Turpin went to Neville High School in his hometown of Monroe, Louisiana. As a senior, he had 1,928 all-purpose yards, including 904 rushing and 724 receiving, and 29 touchdowns. He received All-state, All-Northeast Louisiana and All-NELA Big School Offensive Player of the Year honors.

He was a three-star recruit and no. 12 prospect from all of Louisiana. On January 25, 2015, he committed to TCU over another scholarship offer from Texas Tech. He played varsity basketball as a guard, averaging 12.9 points per game between his junior and senior years.

== College career ==
=== 2015 season ===
Turpin accepted a football scholarship from Texas Christian University in Fort Worth. As a true freshman, he started in five of 13 games. On October 5, he was named Big 12 Co-Offensive Player of the Week, after posting career-best totals of 6 receptions for 138 yards and four receiving touchdowns in the Horned Frogs' 50–7 win over the University of Texas. The four touchdown receptions were the most by a freshman in Big 12 history. He injured his neck and shoulder in the seventh game against Iowa State University and missed the remainder of the contest.

Turpin had 7 receptions for 107 yards and one touchdown in the ninth game against Oklahoma State University. In the twelfth game against Baylor University, he made a game-winning 8-yard catch in the second overtime. He finished the season with 45 receptions (freshman school record), 649 receiving yards (freshman school record), 8 receiving touchdowns (freshman school record), 1,675 all-purpose yards (led the team) and averaged 15.3 yards every time he touched the ball.

He was second in the Big 12 and tied for 14th nationally with his 27-yard average in kickoff returns, the highest mark by a Horned Frog since Greg McCoy in 2011 (30.6). He was the only player in the nation to rank in the top 25 in both kickoff and punt returns. He was named freshman All-American by the FWAA and honorable-mention All-Big 12 selection as a return specialist.

=== 2016 season ===
As a sophomore, Turpin was limited by injuries, appearing in eight games while registering 30 receptions for 295 yards and one receiving touchdown. He averaged 16.2 yards on punt returns and 30.8 on kickoff returns. He was one of five players nationally with a punt return and kickoff return for a touchdown. On September 6, he was named the Big 12 Special Teams Player of the Week after having an 81-yard punt return for a touchdown (sixth longest in school history) in the season opener against South Dakota State while also having 7 receptions for 62 yards, 177 all-purpose yards (82 punt returns, 62 receiving, 33 rushing).

On September 12, he was named the Big 12 Special Teams Player of the Week after totaling 169 return yards (33 punt, 136 kickoff), including a career-long 64-yard kickoff return with less than a minute to play in the game to put the offense in position for a potential game-winning field goal, while also tying a career-high with seven receptions for 126 yards and having a career-high best 295 all-purpose yards (136 kickoff returns, 33 punt returns, 126 receiving). His 90-yard punt return for a score in the sixth game against the University of Kansas, tied for the second-longest in school history.

=== 2017 season ===
As a junior, he appeared in all 14 games with three starts, registering 41 receptions for 394 yards, one receiving touchdown, and 1,202 all-purpose yards. He returned a punt for a touchdown in win over the University of Kansas, returned a kickoff for a touchdown against Iowa State University and threw a touchdown in a win over West Virginia University, becoming only the fifth player in the previous 10 seasons with that stat line. He was named Big 12 Special Teams Player of the Week against the University of Kansas for returning three punts for 95 yards and a touchdown. He was named first-team All-Big 12 kick and punt returner, a first-team AP All-Big 12 (all-purpose), honorable-mention All-Big 12 as a wide receiver and honorable-mention Big 12 Special Teams Player of the Year.

=== 2018 season ===
As a senior, Turpin played much of the season with a warrant out for his arrest from failure to appear to a domestic violence charge in New Mexico. Gary Patterson and the TCU Coaching staff were aware of the spring break arrest, but failed to investigate it and claim they did not know about the outstanding warrant. He was second on the team in receptions (29), receiving yards (410) and receiving touchdowns (three). He also returned a kickoff and a punt for touchdowns, and his punt-return average of 19.4 yards per attempt tied for the FBS lead. On September 10, he was named the Big 12 Special Teams Player of the Week, after having a 78-yard punt return for a touchdown, making it the fourth of his career and a school record. On October 9, he returned a kickoff for a 98-yard touchdown against the University of Oklahoma, making it his sixth career return (four punts, two kickoffs) for a touchdown, which was also a school record.

==== Domestic violence charges ====
On October 23, he was dismissed from the team for two domestic violence charges. At the time, he was leading the nation by averaging almost 20 yards per punt return. He finished his college career as arguably the school's greatest returner: His four punt returns for a touchdown and six career special teams touchdowns were the most in TCU history.

== Professional career ==
Pre-draft measurables
Height	Weight	Arm length	Hand span	Wingspan	40-yard dash	10-yard split	20-yard split	20-yard shuttle	Three-cone drill	Vertical jump	Broad jump	Bench press
5 ft 8 7/8 in (1.75 m)	158 lb (72 kg)	29 5/8 in (0.75 m)	7 3/4 in (0.20 m)	5 ft 11 1/4 in (1.81 m)	4.31 s	1.65 s	2.61 s	4.25 s	6.65 s	40.0 in (1.02 m)	10 ft 9 in (3.28 m)	2 reps
All values from Pro Day

=== Frisco Fighters ===
In 2019, Turpin was ruled ineligible to participate in TCU's Pro Day, forcing him to hold his own workout, where he put up a 40-yard dash time of 4.31 seconds. After going unselected in the 2019 NFL draft and not getting an opportunity to play because of off-the-field issues, he signed with the Frisco Fighters of the Indoor Football League in 2020. However, he never played a game with the team as the season was canceled due to the COVID-19 pandemic.

=== FCF Glacier Boyz ===
Turpin joined the FCF Glacier Boyz for the 2021 inaugural season. He posted 13 receptions for 223 yards and 4 receiving touchdowns over the 6-game season.

=== The Spring League ===
In 2021, he signed with the Sea Lions of The Spring League (TSL). He appeared in 6 games and was tied for second in the league with 3 receiving touchdowns.

=== Panthers Wrocław ===
In August 2021 season, the Panthers Wrocław of the European League of Football (ELF) based in Poland, signed him mid-season as a replacement for injured running back Mark Herndon. There he won 3 out of 4 regular season games with an important win over the Hamburg Sea Devils, where he registered 293 yards of total offense and two touchdowns. He finished the regular season with 702 all-purpose yards and six touchdowns. In the semi-final on the road, Turpin and the Panthers lost 27 to 30 in a close game against the Sea Devils. On November 2, the franchise re-signed him for the 2022 season, but he instead opted to be eligible for the draft of the newly founded USFL.

=== New Jersey Generals ===
Turpin was selected by the New Jersey Generals in the 13th round (103rd overall) of the 2022 USFL draft. He appeared in 10 games (seven starts), making 44 receptions (2nd) for 540 yards (1st), four receiving touchdowns (2nd), 23 carries for 129 yards, one rushing touchdown, 921 all-purpose yards (4th), 12 punt returns (3rd) for 184 yards (1st), and a touchdown (1st). He was named the league's Most Valuable Player of the inaugural USFL season.

=== Dallas Cowboys ===
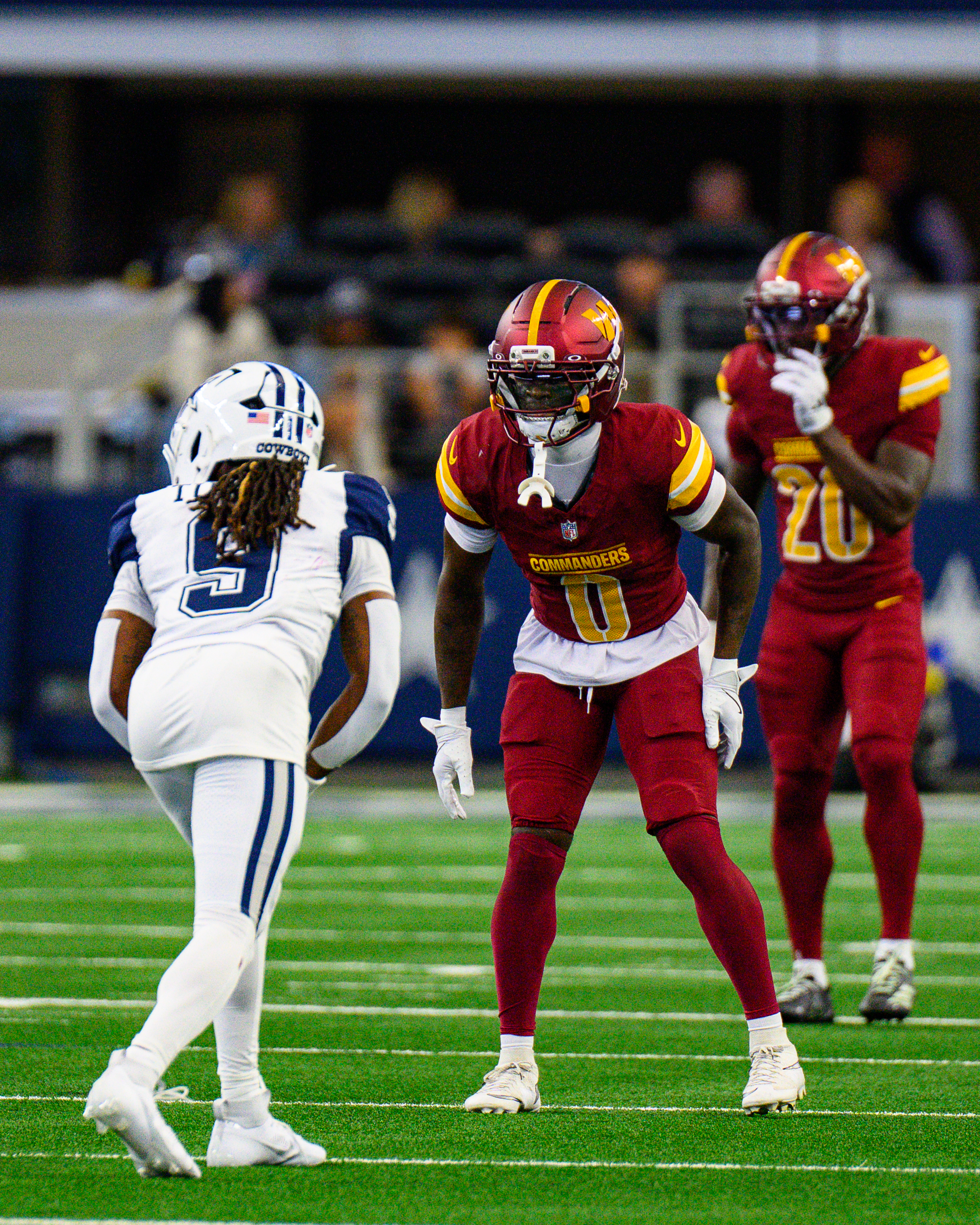
Turpin in a game against the Washington Commanders in 2025

On July 27, 2022, Turpin signed a three-year, $2.56 million contract with the Dallas Cowboys of the NFL. On August 20, in the second pre-season game played at SoFi Stadium against the Los Angeles Chargers, Turpin scored two touchdowns: the first on a 98-yard kickoff return in the first quarter and the second on an 86-yard punt return in the second quarter, thus paving the way for a 32–18 Cowboys victory. Turpin also added one rush attempt for seven yards during the game. Turpin was active for all 17 games during the regular season and both games during the postseason. He finished the regular season with one catch for nine yards, three rush attempts for 17 yards, and 508 kick return yards as well as 303 punt return yards. On December 21, Turpin was named to the Pro Bowl. In the postseason, Turpin added one catch for eight yards, 155 kick return yards, and seven punt return yards to those totals.

In Week 1 of the 2023 season, Turpin scored his first NFL touchdown on a 7-yard rush in the fourth quarter against the New York Giants. The Cowboys won on the road 40–0. He scored his first receiving touchdown in Week 5 against the San Francisco 49ers. In the 2023 season, he had 12 receptions for 127 yards and three touchdowns to go with a rushing touchdown.

In Week 1 against the Cleveland Browns, Turpin had a 60-yard punt return for a touchdown in the 33–17 win. In Week 6 against the Detroit Lions, Turpin made 4 kick returns for a career-high 194 yards. In Week 12, Turpin had a 99–yard kick return touchdown that helped the Cowboys defeat the Washington Commanders on the road 34–26. He earned NFC Special Teams Player of the Week. The following week against the Giants, he made his first career fumble recovery following his own fumble, forced by Art Green. He finished the 2024 season with 31 receptions for 420 yards and two receiving touchdowns to with a kickoff return touchdown and a punt return touchdown. He earned first team All-Pro honors. He earned Pro Bowl honors for the second time.

On March 11, 2025, Turpin signed a three-year, $13.5 million contract extension with the Cowboys, with $5 million guaranteed. In Week 4 against the Green Bay Packers, with a 1:45 left in the fourth quarter, Turpin made a crucial 45-yard kick return as Dallas was behind at home 30–34. The Cowboys scored a touchdown four plays later, bringing the game to 37–34, as it was brought into overtime and ended in a 40–40 tie. In their Thanksgiving game against the Kansas City Chiefs, Turpin recovered a fourth-quarter fumble by George Pickens deep in Chiefs territory that allowed the team to kick the game-winning field goal. He finished the 2025 season with 26 receptions for 396 yards and two touchdowns while contributing on kickoff returns. He earned Pro Bowl honors for the third time.

== Career statistics ==
=== College ===
Legend
**Bold**	Career high

Season	GP	Receiving				Rushing				Kick returns				Punt returns			
Season	GP	Rec	Yds	Avg	TD	Att	Yds	Avg	TD	Ret	Yds	Avg	TD	Ret	Yds	Avg	TD
2015	13	**45**	**649**	**14.4**	**8**	**20**	**116**	5.8	0	**27**	**729**	27.0	0	**17**	181	10.6	**1**
2016	8	30	295	9.8	1	9	84	**9.3**	0	17	482	28.4	0	10	125	12.5	**1**
2017	**14**	41	394	9.6	1	11	86	7.8	**2**	15	462	**30.8**	**1**	16	**260**	16.3	**1**
2018	7	29	410	14.1	3	4	32	8.0	0	12	312	26.0	**1**	9	175	**19.4**	**1**
Career	42	145	1,748	12.1	13	44	318	7.2	2	71	1,985	28.0	2	52	741	14.3	4

Legend
	Led the league
**Bold**	Career best

=== FCF ===
Regular season

Year	Team	Games		Receiving				Rushing				Kickoff returns				Punt returns			
Year	Team	GP	GS	Rec	Yds	Avg	TD	Att	Yds	Avg	TD	Ret	Yds	Avg	TD	Ret	Yds	Avg	TD
2021	GLA	4	4	11	197	17.9	4	—				—				—			
FCF career		4	4	11	197	17.9	4	0	0	0.0	0	0	0	0.0	0	0	0	0.0	0

=== TSL ===
Regular season

Year	Team	Games		Receiving				Rushing				Kickoff returns				Punt returns			
Year	Team	GP	GS	Rec	Yds	Avg	TD	Att	Yds	Avg	TD	Ret	Yds	Avg	TD	Ret	Yds	Avg	TD
2021	SL	6	6	17	240	14.1	3	—				—				—			
TSL career		6	6	17	240	14.1	3	0	0	0.0	0	0	0	0.0	0	0	0	0.0	0

=== ELF ===
Regular season

Year	Team	Games		Receiving				Rushing				Kickoff returns				Punt returns			
Year	Team	GP	GS	Rec	Yds	Avg	TD	Att	Yds	Avg	TD	Ret	Yds	Avg	TD	Ret	Yds	Avg	TD
2021	PAN	4	4	22	253	11.5	4	7	47	6.7	1	6	160	26.7	0	4	72	18.0	0
ELF career		4	4	22	253	11.5	4	7	47	6.7	1	6	160	26.7	0	4	72	18.0	0

Postseason

Year	Team	Games		Receiving				Rushing				Kickoff returns				Punt returns			
Year	Team	GP	GS	Rec	Yds	Avg	TD	Att	Yds	Avg	TD	Ret	Yds	Avg	TD	Ret	Yds	Avg	TD
2021	PAN	1	1	10	121	12.1	2	1	7	7.0	0	1	42	42.0	0	—			
ELF career		1	1	10	121	12.1	2	1	7	7.0	0	1	42	42.0	0	0	0	0.0	0

=== USFL ===
Regular season

Year	Team	Games		Receiving				Rushing				Kickoff returns				Punt returns			
Year	Team	GP	GS	Rec	Yds	Avg	TD	Att	Yds	Avg	TD	Ret	Yds	Avg	TD	Ret	Yds	Avg	TD
2022	NJG	10	7	44	540	12.3	4	23	129	5.6	1	3	68	22.7	0	12	184	15.3	1
USFL career		10	7	44	540	12.3	4	23	129	5.6	1	3	68	22.7	0	12	184	15.3	1

Postseason

Year	Team	Games		Receiving				Rushing				Kickoff returns				Punt returns			
Year	Team	GP	GS	Rec	Yds	Avg	TD	Att	Yds	Avg	TD	Ret	Yds	Avg	TD	Ret	Yds	Avg	TD
2022	NJG	1	1	3	20	6.7	0	2	3	1.5	0	—				1	78	78.0	1
USFL career		1	1	3	20	6.7	0	2	3	1.5	0	0	0	0.0	0	1	78	78.0	1

=== NFL ===
Regular season

Year	Team	Games		Receiving				Rushing				Kick returns				Punt returns			
Year	Team	GP	GS	Rec	Yds	Avg	TD	Att	Yds	Avg	TD	Ret	Yds	Avg	TD	Ret	Yds	Avg	TD
2022	DAL	17	0	1	9	9.0	0	3	17	5.7	0	21	508	24.2	0	**29**	**303**	**10.4**	0
2023	DAL	16	0	12	127	10.6	**3**	11	**110**	**10.0**	**1**	10	292	29.2	0	13	79	6.1	0
2024	DAL	17	2	**31**	**420**	13.5	2	16	92	5.8	0	27	904	**33.5**	**1**	18	187	**10.4**	**1**
2025	DAL	15	2	26	396	**15.2**	2	**17**	89	5.2	0	**69**	**1,814**	26.3	0	10	55	5.5	0
2026	DAL	7	0	5	49	9.8	0	3	19	6.3	1	21	574	27.3	0	11	108	9.8	0
NFL career		72	4	75	1,001	13.3	7	50	327	6.5	1	148	4,092	27.6	1	81	732	9.0	1

Postseason

Year	Team	Games		Receiving				Rushing				Kick returns				Punt returns			
Year	Team	GP	GS	Rec	Yds	Avg	TD	Att	Yds	Avg	TD	Ret	Yds	Avg	TD	Ret	Yds	Avg	TD
2022	DAL	**2**	0	**1**	**8**	**8.0**	0	0	0	0.0	0	**5**	**155**	**31.0**	0	**2**	**7**	**3.5**	0
2023	DAL	1	0	0	0	0.0	0	0	0	0.0	0	**5**	127	25.4	0	0	0	0.0	0
NFL career		3	0	1	8	8.0	0	0	0	0.0	0	10	282	28.2	0	2	7	3.5	0

== Career highlights ==
=== Awards and honors ===
NFL

- First-team All-Pro (2024) (Note: Selected as a kick returner)
- Second-team All-Pro (2025) (Note: Selected as a kick returner)
- 3× Pro Bowl (2022, 2024, 2025) (Note: Selected as a return specialist)
- 2× NFL kickoff return yards leader (2024, 2025)

USFL

- USFL Most Valuable Player (2022)
- All-USFL (2022) (Note: Selected as a wide receiver and punt returner)
- USFL receiving yards leader (2022)

College

- Freshman All-American (2015) (Note: Selected as a kick returner)
- SB Nation Honorable-Mention All-American – Kick & Punt Returner (2017)
- 2× Honorable-Mention Big 12 Special Teams Player of the Year (2016, 2017)
- Honorable-Mention Big 12 Offensive Freshman of the Year (2015)
- First-Team AP All-Big 12 – All-Purpose (2017)
- First-Team ESPN All-Big 12 – Punt Returner (2015)
- First-Team All-Big 12 – Kick & Punt Returner (2017)
- 2× Honorable Mention All-Big 12 – Return Specialist (2015, 2016)
- Honorable Mention All-Big 12 – Wide Receiver (2017)
- Preseason All-Big 12 – Return Specialist (2017)
- Big 12 Offensive Player of the Week (1× 2015)
- Big 12 Special Teams Player of the Week (2× 2016, 1× 2017)

=== Records ===
Big 12 Conference

- 1st – Average yards per punt return (Big 12 Championship Game): 50.2
- 1st – Receiving touchdowns (freshman game): 4
- 4th – Average yards per kick return (career): 20.8
- 5th – Average yards per punt return (career): 14.3
- 6th – Punt return touchdowns (career): 4 (tied, Phillip Brooks)

Texas Christian University

- 9th – Most receiving touchdowns (career): 13
- 7th – Most receiving touchdowns (season): 8 (2015)
- 1st – Highest average yards per reception (game): 86.0 (2015)
- 2nd – Most punt return touchdowns (career): 4
- 4th – Highest average yards per punt return (career): 14.2
- 2nd – Highest average yards per punt return (game): 41.0 (2016)
- 1st – Kick returns (career): 71 (tied, Cory Rodgers)
- 1st – Kick return yards (career): 1,985
- 1st – Combined kick and punt return yards (career): 2,726
- 1st – Combined kick and punt return touchdowns (career): 6 (tied, Derius Davis)
- 1st – Receptions (freshman season): 45
- 1st – Receiving yards (freshman season): 649
- 1st – Receiving touchdowns (freshman season): 8

== Personal life ==
=== Domestic violence charges ===
In 2019, Turpin pleaded guilty in a second family violence case against his former girlfriend which occurred in October 2018. He was cut from the TCU football program by Gary Patterson shortly after he was informed of this second battery charge against him. Despite Patterson and the TCU Coaching staff knowing about his previous assault, he was allowed to continue to play throughout the 2018 season until he committed the second offense against the same woman. As part of his plea agreement, he served two years deferred adjudication probation and completed a 27-week Partner Abuse Intervention Program.

=== Drug and weapon possession charges ===
On July 5, 2025, Turpin was charged by the Allen Police Department for marijuana possession (less than two ounces) and unlawful carrying of a weapon after he was pulled over for driving 97 miles per hour in a zone with speed limit of 70. He was released the next day after posting a $1,500 bail.
