= Alex McGough =

American football player (born 1995)

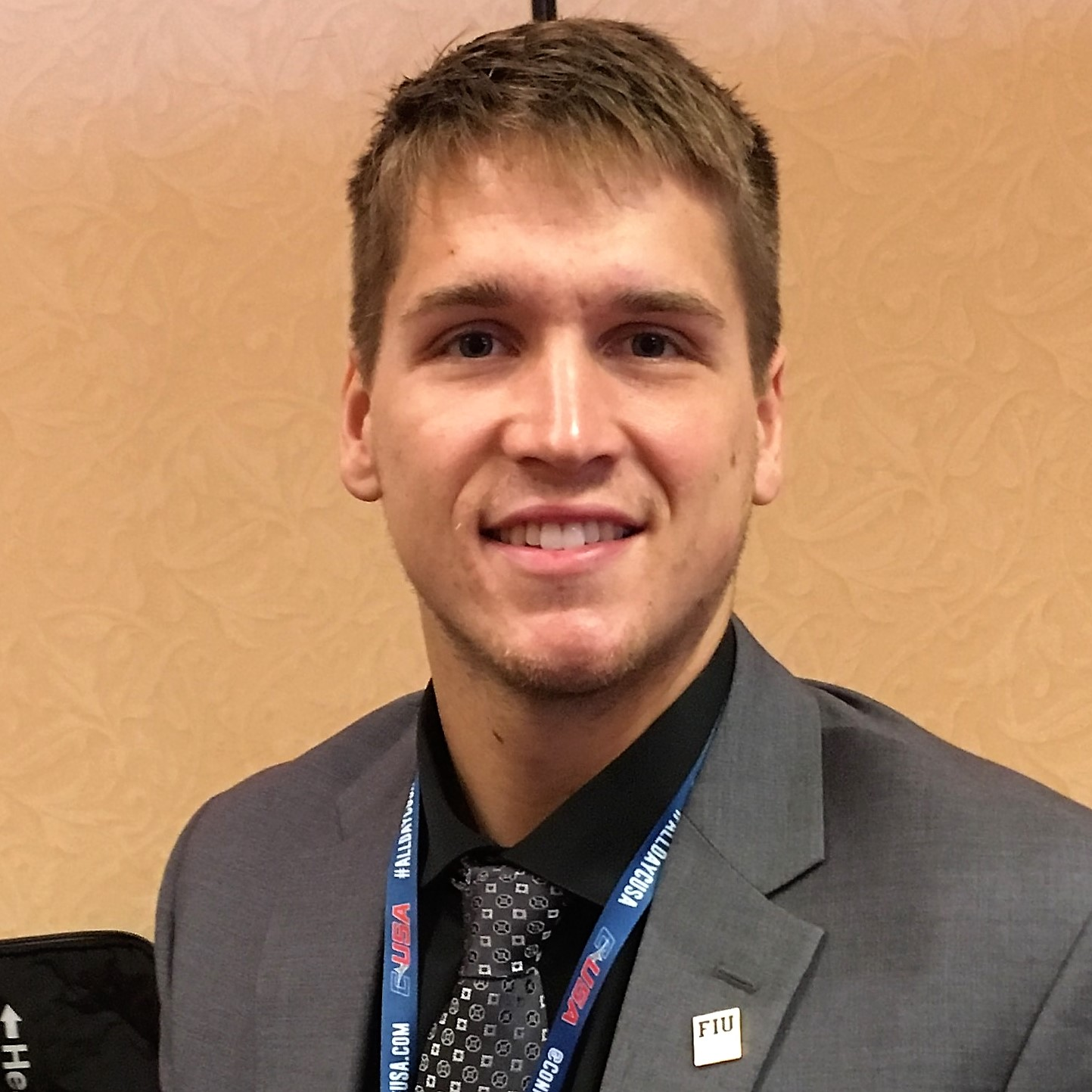
- McGough in 2017

No. 2, 10, 17
- Position: Quarterback

Personal information
- Born: November 19, 1995 (age 31); Tampa, Florida, U.S.
- Listed height: 6 ft 3 in (1.91 m)
- Listed weight: 214 lb (97 kg)

Career information
- High school: Gaither (Tampa)
- College: FIU (2014–2017)
- NFL draft: 2018: 7th round, 220th overall pick

Career history
- Seattle Seahawks (2018)*; Jacksonville Jaguars (2019)*; Houston Texans (2019–2020); Seattle Seahawks (2020–2021)*; Birmingham Stallions (2022–2023); Green Bay Packers (2023–2024)*; Birmingham Stallions (2025)
- * Offseason or practice squad member only

Awards and highlights
- 2× USFL champion (2022, 2023); USFL Most Valuable Player (2023); All-USFL Team (2023); USFL passing touchdowns leader (2023); USFL passer rating leader (2023); USFL completion percentage leader (2023)

Career USFL statistics
- Passing attempts: 342
- Passing completions: 219
- Completion percentage: 64.0%
- TD–INT: 23–8
- Passing yards: 2,565
- Passer rating: 99.4
- Stats at Pro Football Reference

Alexander Lee McGough (/məˈɡuː/ mə-GOO; born November 19, 1995) is an American former professional football player who was a quarterback in the National Football League (NFL). McGough played college football for the FIU Panthers, and was selected by the Seattle Seahawks in the seventh round of the 2018 NFL draft. He was also a member of the Jacksonville Jaguars, Houston Texans, Green Bay Packers, and Birmingham Stallions.

== College career ==
=== 2014 season ===
On August 30, 2014, McGough made his FIU debut, recording 117 yards and a touchdown against Bethune–Cookman. On September 27, he threw an 85-yard and a 75-yard touchdown against UAB. On November 15, he recorded a season-high 231 yards and three touchdowns against Middle Tennessee. He finished his rookie season recording 1,680 yards and 14 touchdowns.

=== 2015 season ===
On October 17, 2015, McGough attempted a career-high 51 passes against Middle Tennessee, second most in school history. On October 24, McGough recorded a career-best 390 yards (2nd in school history) versus Old Dominion. He completed 31 of 39 passes, good for 2nd most completions and 4th highest percentage in school history. On November 7, McGough recorded 284 yards and three touchdowns in a 48–31 blowout against Charlotte. He finished his second season completing 269 of 420 passes for 2,722 yards and 21 touchdowns, all school records (he broke his record for passing yards in 2017).

=== 2016 season ===
On October 2, 2016, McGough ran for a career-high two touchdowns against Florida Atlantic. The next week, he threw a season-high 3 touchdowns against UTEP. On October 15, McGough threw for a season-high 315 yards and scored three touchdowns, including the game-winner against Charlotte. He missed the final three games of the season due to a wrist injury.

=== 2017 season ===
On August 31, 2017, McGough threw a 75-yard touchdown pass in the season opener against UCF. The next week, he threw for a season-high 328 yards and runs in a game-winning touchdown against Alcorn State. On September 30, McGough led the Panthers to a 19-point comeback win over Charlotte, outscoring the 49ers 16–3 in the second half to a 30–29 win. On December 2, he threw a season-high three touchdowns and ran for a career-high 108 yards against UMass. He became the third quarterback in FIU history to run over 100 yards in a game. He ended his senior season with a completion percentage of 65.3% and a passer rating of 142.8, both school records (previous records were 64% in 2015 by himself & 141.5 rating by Jamie Burke in 2002).

The Panthers finished with an 8–4 record, qualifying for a bowl game for the first time since 2011. On December 22, 2017, McGough left in the first quarter of the 2017 Gasparilla Bowl against Temple with a fractured collarbone. The Panthers would go on to lose 28–3.

== Professional career ==
Pre-draft measurables
Height	Weight	Arm length	Hand span	40-yard dash	10-yard split	20-yard split	20-yard shuttle	Three-cone drill	Vertical jump	Broad jump
6 ft 3 3/8 in (1.91 m)	214 lb (97 kg)	31 1/4 in (0.79 m)	9 1/8 in (0.23 m)	4.70 s	1.60 s	2.65 s	4.50 s	7.27 s	32.5 in (0.83 m)	9 ft 4 in (2.84 m)
All values from Pro Day

=== Seattle Seahawks (first stint) ===
McGough was selected by the Seattle Seahawks in the seventh round, 220th overall, of the 2018 NFL draft. He was the first quarterback drafted by the Seahawks since Russell Wilson in 2012. On May 15, 2018, he signed his rookie contract. McGough was waived by Seattle on September 1, and was re-signed to the practice squad.

=== Jacksonville Jaguars ===
On January 15, 2019, McGough signed a reserve/future contract with the Jacksonville Jaguars. He was waived by Jacksonville on August 31.

=== Houston Texans ===
On September 1, 2019, McGough was signed to the Houston Texans' practice squad. He was promoted to the active roster on September 10. McGough was waived by Houston on October 16, and was re-signed to the team's practice squad. He signed a reserve/future contract with the Texans on January 13, 2020.

McGough was waived on August 31, 2020. He was re-signed to the practice squad on September 14. McGough was released by the Texans on October 12.

=== Seattle Seahawks (second stint) ===
On December 9, 2020, McGough was signed to the Seattle Seahawks' practice squad. On January 11, 2021, McGough signed a reserve/futures contract with the Seahawks. McGough was waived by Seattle on August 23.

=== Birmingham Stallions (first stint) ===
McGough was selected by the Birmingham Stallions of the United States Football League (USFL) with the sixth pick of the first round of the 2022 USFL draft. He suffered an ankle injury, and was transferred to the inactive roster on April 22, 2022. He was moved back to the active roster on May 6. During the 2022 USFL championship game, McGough replaced an injured J'Mar Smith, throwing for seven completions on 10 attempts for 77 yards, and a touchdown, helping the Stallions earn their first USFL championship.

McGough entered the 2023 season as Smith's backup but was thrust back into the starting role when Smith suffered a season-ending injury in the Stallions' first game. He would go on to earn USFL MVP honors and lead the Stallions to their second consecutive USFL championship.

McGough was released from his contract with the Stallions on July 18, 2023, to sign with an NFL team.

=== Green Bay Packers ===
On July 19, 2023, McGough signed with the Green Bay Packers. He was released on August 29. A day later, McGough was signed to the Packers' practice squad. He signed a reserve/future contract on January 22, 2024. On May 3, it was announced by head coach Matt LaFleur that McGough would transition from quarterback to wide receiver. He was released by the Packers with an injury designation on July 19. On November 20, the Packers re-signed McGough to the practice squad.

=== Birmingham Stallions (second stint) ===
On January 23, 2025, McGough re-signed with the Birmingham Stallions of the United Football League (UFL). He was placed on injured reserve on April 10, and again on June 2.

On January 20, 2026, after much of the Stallions roster and coaching staff resigned and McGough went unclaimed in the 2026 UFL redraft, it was reported that McGough retired from professional football.

== Career statistics ==
Legend
	USFL MVP
	Won the USFL championship
	Led the league
**Bold**	Career high

=== Regular season ===
League	Year	Team	Games			Passing									Rushing				
League	Year	Team	GP	GS	Record	Cmp	Att	Pct	Yds	Y/A	Lng	TD	Int	Rtg	Att	Yds	Avg	Lng	TD
USFL	2022	BHAM	7	3	3–0	39	75	52.0	460	6.1	40	3	3	67.6	33	135	4.1	22	3
USFL	2023	BHAM	**10**	**9**	**7–2**	**180**	**267**	**67.4**	**2,105**	**7.9**	71	**20**	**5**	**108.3**	**70**	**403**	**5.7**	29	**5**
UFL	2025	BHAM	2	2	1–1	10	24	41.7	89	3.7	22	1	1	48.8	9	85	9.4	26	0
Career			19	14	11–3	229	365	62.7	2,654	11.9	71	24	9	99.4	112	619	5.5	29	8

=== Postseason ===
League	Year	Team	Games			Passing									Rushing				
League	Year	Team	GP	GS	Record	Cmp	Att	Pct	Yds	Y/A	Lng	TD	Int	Rtg	Att	Yds	Avg	Lng	TD
USFL	2022	BHAM	1	0	—	7	10	**70.0**	77	7.7	15	1	**1**	86.2	4	15	3.7	10	0
USFL	2023	BHAM	**2**	**2**	**2–0**	**39**	**56**	69.6	**553**	**9.8**	42	**8**	0	**140.8**	**17**	**148**	**8.7**	23	**1**
Career			3	2	2–0	46	66	69.6	630	9.5	42	9	1	133.2	21	163	7.7	23	1

== Personal life ==
McGough's uncle, Kelly Goodburn, was an NFL punter for the Kansas City Chiefs and the Washington Redskins. His younger brother Shane was an offensive lineman for FIU.
