= New Jersey Generals (2022) =

American football team (2022–2023)

Logo

General information
- Founded: 2021
- Folded: 2023
- Headquartered: Tom Benson Hall of Fame Stadium in Canton, Ohio
- Colors: Scarlet red, navy blue, gold, white
- Mascot: General Jersey

Personnel
- Owners: National Spring Football League Enterprises Co, LLC, (Fox Sports)
- General manager: Billy Devaney (2023)
- Head coach: Mike Riley (2022–2023)

Team history
- New Jersey Generals (2022–2023)

Home fields
- Protective Stadium / Legion Field (2022); Tom Benson Hall of Fame Stadium (2023)

League / conference affiliations
- United States Football League (2022–2023): North Division (2022–2023)

Championships
- Division championships: 1; 2022

Playoff appearances (1)
- 2022

The New Jersey Generals were a professional American football team. The Generals competed in the United States Football League (USFL) as a member club of the league's North division. Though named after the 1980s USFL team of the same name, which played at The Meadowlands in East Rutherford, New Jersey, the Generals never played in New Jersey nor the New York metropolitan area the original Generals represented, instead playing its home games at the USFL's hub at Protective Stadium and Legion Field in Birmingham, Alabama in 2022, and at Tom Benson Hall of Fame Stadium in Canton, Ohio (shared with the Pittsburgh Maulers) in 2023 under the USFL's stadium sharing model. The Generals were one of eight teams that joined the USFL in 2022.

On December 19, 2023, the USFL informed its players union that the Generals would not be among four USFL teams to be contracted as part of the league's upcoming merger with the XFL.

== History ==
The New Jersey Generals were one of eight teams that were officially announced as a USFL franchise on The Herd with Colin Cowherd on November 22, 2021. USFL co-founder Brian Woods had been using the Generals brand for teams in The Spring League since 2019. On January 6, 2022, it was announced on The Herd with Colin Cowherd that former NFL, AAF, and NCAA Football Head coach Mike Riley was named the Head coach and General manager of the Generals.

The team was placed to select fourth overall in the 2022 USFL draft, where they selected Ben Holmes. Holmes was injured in training camp and ultimately released, but this allowed for the Generals to sign Luis Perez, who impressed during the season, starting only 6 games, finishing in the top 5 in passing yards and touchdowns. The Generals also selected KaVontae Turpin as their top receiver, who lead the USFL in receiving yards (540), coupled with 4 touchdowns. He was also selected as to the All-USFL Team, alongside teammates Darius Victor, Terry Poole, Garrett McGhin, Toby Johnson and Shalom Luani in addition to winning USFL Most Valuable Player Award. The Generals won the top seed in the North Division with a 9–1 record. Despite the top seed in the North Division, the Generals were upset by the Philadelphia Stars, 19–14 in the North Division Championship Game.

On October 18, 2022, the team hired Billy Devaney as the team's general manager.

On December 19, 2023, the USFL informed its players union that the Generals would not be among four USFL teams to be contracted as part of the league's upcoming merger with the XFL.

== Player history ==
=== Current NFL Players ===
USFL Season	Pos	Name	NFL team
2022	WR	KaVontae Turpin	Dallas Cowboys

=== USFL MVP award winners ===
Generals USFL MVP winners
Year	Player	Position	Selector
2022	KaVontae Turpin	WR	USFL

=== USFL Offensive Player of the Year award winners ===
Generals USFL OPOY winners
Year	Player	Position	Selector
2022	Darius Victor	RB	USFL

== Coach history ==
=== Head coach history ===
#	Name	Term	Regular season				Playoffs			Awards
#	Name	Term	GC	W	L	Win %	GC	W	L	Awards
New Jersey Generals
1	Mike Riley	2022–2023	20	12	8	.600	1	0	1	*2022 USFL Coach of the Year

=== Offensive coordinator history ===
#	Name	Term	Regular season				Playoffs			Awards
#	Name	Term	GC	W	L	Win %	GC	W	L	Awards
New Jersey Generals
1	Steven Smith	2022–2023	20	12	8	.600	1	0	1	

=== Defensive Coordinator history ===
#	Name	Term	Regular season				Playoffs			Awards
#	Name	Term	GC	W	L	Win %	GC	W	L	Awards
New Jersey Generals
1	Cris Dishman	2022	10	9	1	.900	1	0	1	
2	Ted Cottrell	2023	10	3	7	.300	–	–	–	

== Championships ==
=== Division championships ===
Year	Coach	Record
2022	Mike Riley	9–1
Total Division Championships won: 1		

== Records ==
All-time Generals leaders
Leader	Player	Record	Years with Generals
Passing yards	De'Andre Johnson	1,712 passing yards	2022–2023
Passing Touchdowns	Luis Perez	9 passing touchdowns	2022
Rushing yards	Darius Victor	1,127 rushing yards	2022–2023
Rushing Touchdowns	Darius Victor	13 rushing touchdowns	2022–2023
Receiving yards	Alonzo Moore	713 receiving yards	2022–2023
Receiving Touchdowns	Alonzo Moore	8 receiving touchdowns	2022–2023
Receptions	Alonzo Moore	51 receptions	2022–2023
Tackles	Chris Orr	159 tackles	2022–2023
Sacks	Hercules Mata'afa	6.0 sacks	2022–2023
Interceptions	Shalom Luani	6 interceptions	2022–2023
Coaching wins	Mike Riley	12 wins	2022–2023

== Statistics and records ==
=== Season-by-season record ===
Note: The finish, wins, losses, and ties columns list regular season results and exclude any postseason play.

Legend
USFL champions^{†}	Division champions^{^}	Wild Card berth^{#}

New Jersey Generals season-by-season records
Season	Team	League	Division	Regular season					Postseason results	Awards
Season	Team	League	Division	Finish	Wins	Losses	Ties	Pct	Postseason results	Awards
2022	2022	USFL	North^{^}	1st^{^}	9	1	0	.900	Lost Division finals (Stars) 14–19	KaVontae Turpin (MVP); Darius Victor (OPOY); Mike Riley (COY)
2023	2023	USFL	North	4th	3	7	0	.300	–	–
Totals					12	8	0	.600	(2022–2023, regular season)	
Totals					0	1	—	.000	(2022–2023, playoffs)	
Totals					12	9	0	.571	(2022–2023, regular season and playoffs)	

=== Rivalries ===
==== Northern Duel ====
The New Jersey Generals shared a rivalry with the Michigan Panthers. This rivalry was called the Northern Duel. The Generals finished with a 3–1 record against the Michigan Panthers in 2 seasons. After the 2023 season the rivalry was not renewed as the New Jersey Generals folded during the XFL–USFL merger of 2024.

==== Franchise matchup history ====
Team	Record	Pct.
Tampa Bay Bandits	1–0	1.000
Michigan Panthers	3–1	.750
Pittsburgh Maulers	3–1	.750
Philadelphia Stars	3–2	.600
Houston Gamblers	1–1	.500
New Orleans Breakers	1–1	.500
Memphis Showboats	0–1	.000
Birmingham Stallions	0–2	.000
