= USFL championship game =

American football championship game

The USFL championship game was the annual championship game for the United States Football League that was played from 2022 to 2023. Held at the end of each season to determine its league winner for that season, both USFL championship games took place during the first week of July at the Tom Benson Hall of Fame Stadium in Canton, Ohio. Its modern successor is the USFL Conference championship, a playoff game in the United Football League (UFL); winners of the USFL Conference Championship advanced to the UFL championship game.

The final USFL conference champions as of 2025 are the Michigan Panthers. The Birmingham Stallions have the most championships, with three. The USFL conference was dissolved October 7, 2025, along with the Panthers.

== List of games ==
Every winning team in bold.

Season	Winning team	Score	Losing team	Location	Stadium
2022	**Birmingham Stallions** (1)	**33**–30	Philadelphia Stars	Canton, Ohio	Tom Benson Hall of Fame Stadium
2023	**Birmingham Stallions** (2)	**28**–12	Pittsburgh Maulers	Canton, Ohio	Tom Benson Hall of Fame Stadium
2024	**Birmingham Stallions** (3)	**31**–18	Michigan Panthers	Birmingham, Alabama	Protective Stadium
2025	**Michigan Panthers** (1)	**44**–29	Birmingham Stallions	Birmingham, Alabama	Protective Stadium

== Appearances by year ==
In the sortable table below, teams are ordered first by number of appearances, then by number of wins, and finally by year of first appearance. In the "Season(s)" column, bold years indicate winning championship games. Teams marked in gray are now defunct.

Apps	Team	Wins	Losses	Win %	Game(s)
4	Birmingham Stallions	3	1	.750	**2022**, **2023**, **2024**, 2025
2	Michigan Panthers	1	1	.500	2024, **2025**
1	Philadelphia Stars	0	1	.000	2022
1	Pittsburgh Maulers	0	1	.000	2023

== See also ==
- United Bowl
- XFL Championship Game
