= 2023 USFL championship game =

American football championship game

Pittsburgh Maulers (4–6)	Birmingham Stallions (8–2)
12	28
Head coach: Ray Horton	Head coach: Skip Holtz
	1	2	3	4	Total
PIT	3	6	3	0	12
BHAM	0	14	7	7	28
- Date: July 1, 2023
- Kickoff time: 8:00 p.m. EDT (UTC-4)
- Stadium: Tom Benson Hall of Fame Stadium; Canton, Ohio
- MVP: Deon Cain, Birmingham
- Favorite: Birmingham by 7
- Referee: Larry Smith
- Attendance: N/A

Ceremonies
- National anthem: Dylan Scott

TV in the United States
- Network: NBC & Peacock
- Announcers: Jac Collinsworth (play-by-play), Jason Garrett (analyst) and Zora Stephenson (sideline reporter)
- Nielsen ratings: 0.7 (1.157 million viewers) (NBC) (1.2 million viewers) (Peacock)

The 2023 USFL championship game was an American football game that was played on July 1, 2023, at Tom Benson Hall of Fame Stadium in Canton, Ohio. The contest determined the champion of the 2023 USFL season and was played between the Pittsburgh Maulers and the Birmingham Stallions, eventually crowning Birmingham the champion of the league for the second year in a row.

The game featured the number one defense in the league in Pittsburgh facing off against the number one offense in the league in Birmingham. After going up 3–0, the Maulers would fall after Alex McGough threw touchdown passes to Davion Davis and Deon Cain, the eventual MVP, and would never lead again. The Maulers would add additional field goals, though their continued lack of success on the offensive side of the ball would ultimately be the reason they lost the game. The Stallions eventually won the game 28-12 to repeat as USFL champions.

== Background ==
The United States Football League was originally founded in 1982 as a professional spring and summer league. It completed three full seasons, from 1983 to 1985, before folding prior to its 1986 season, which was to be played in the fall, in direct competition with the National Football League (NFL). The direct competition, in addition to a failed antitrust lawsuit against the NFL, led to the league's decline. On June 3, 2021, the new United States Football League, a distinct league from its predecessor, announced that it would begin play with eight teams in spring 2022. The list of eight teams were unveiled on November 22, 2021, all of which shared their name and colors with a team that competed in the original USFL. As part of the USFL's salary structure, each member of the championship team received $10,000 in addition to their salary.

=== Host selection ===
On January 25, 2023, the league announced that the New Jersey Generals and the Pittsburgh Maulers (who sported a new gold-and-black uniform color scheme to emphasize the team's Pittsburgh identity) would play their home games at Tom Benson Hall of Fame Stadium in Canton, with the Generals as the host team. The stadium was also the site of both the North Division playoff game and the 2023 USFL Championship Game, as it was in 2022.

=== USFL playoffs ===
The two lowest-finishing teams from each division were excluded from participation in the playoffs. From the North Division, the New Jersey Generals were mathematically eliminated from playoff contention on June 17, and the Philadelphia Stars were eliminated from postseason contention on June 18. In the South Division, the Memphis Showboats were the first team ruled out of the postseason, on June 17, while the Houston Gamblers were eliminated from postseason contention on June 18.

The first semifinal game was held between the North Division first and second place teams, the Pittsburgh Maulers and the Michigan Panthers. The Maulers win in overtime 31–27 and clinch a berth in the championship game. The second semifinal game followed, which was contested by the Birmingham Stallions and the New Orleans Breakers. The Stallions clinched their championship game spot with a 47–22 win. With their playoff semifinal victories, the Stallions entered the USFL championship game 8–2, while the Maulers entered the USFL championship game 4–6.

==== Bracket ====
Division Finals; June 24–25, 2023
N1	Pittsburgh Maulers	31
N2	Michigan Panthers	27
S1	Birmingham Stallions	47
S2	New Orleans Breakers	22

USFL Championship; July 1, 2023
N1	Pittsburgh Maulers	12
S1	Birmingham Stallions	28

== Teams ==
=== Pittsburgh Maulers ===
Pittsburgh Maulers finished their second overall season, and first under head coach Ray Horton, going 4–6 and advancing to their first playoff berth to the division title game against Michigan Panthers.

=== Birmingham Stallions ===
Birmingham Stallions finished their second overall season under head coach Skip Holtz, going 8–2 and advancing to their first playoff berth to the division title game against New Orleans Breakers.

== Game summary ==
=== Scoring summary ===
2023 USFL championship game

Quarter	1	2	3	4	Total
Pittsburgh Maulers	3	6	3	0	12
Birmingham Stallions	0	14	7	7	28

at Tom Benson Hall of Fame Stadium • Canton, Ohio

- Date: July 1, 2023
- Game time: 8:00 p.m. EST
- Referee: Larry Smith
- TV announcers (NBC): Jac Collinsworth (play-by-play), Jason Garrett (analyst) and Zora Stephenson (sideline reporter)

Scoring summary

Quarter	Time	Drive			Team	Scoring information	Score	
Quarter	Time	Plays	Yards	TOP	Team	Scoring information	Pittsburgh	Birmingham
1	5:27	16	51	9:33	Pittsburgh	37-yard field goal by Chris Blewitt	3	0
2	10:39	6	85	2:54	Birmingham	Davion Davis 42-yard touchdown reception from Alex McGough, Brandon Aubrey kick good	3	7
2	3:01	13	46	7:38	Pittsburgh	36-yard field goal by Chris Blewitt	6	7
2	0:31	7	68	2:30	Birmingham	Deon Cain 3-yard touchdown reception from Alex McGough, Brandon Aubrey kick good	6	14
2	0:00	5	27	0:31	Pittsburgh	55-yard field goal by Chris Blewitt	9	14
3	10:29	8	83	4:31	Birmingham	Deon Cain 20-yard touchdown reception from Alex McGough, Brandon Aubrey kick good	9	21
3	7:45	5	19	2:44	Pittsburgh	51-yard field goal by Chris Blewitt	12	21
4	6:28	2	40	0:54	Birmingham	Deon Cain 40-yard touchdown reception from Alex McGough, Brandon Aubrey kick good	12	28
"TOP" = time of possession. For other American football terms, see Glossary of American football.							12	28

== Statistics ==
Team statistical comparison
Statistic	Pittsburgh	Birmingham
Total plays–net yards	61–202	50–357
Rushing attempts–net yards	17–98	23–150
Yards per rush	5.8	6.5
Yards passing	104	207
Pass completions–attempts	24–38	18–25
Interceptions thrown	0	0
Fumbles lost	1	1
Time of possession	33:51	26:09

Pittsburgh statistics
Maulers passing
	C–A	Yds	TD–INT
Troy Williams	24–37	143	0–0
Garrett Groshek	0–1	0	0–0
Maulers rushing
	Car	Yds	TD
Troy Williams	4	38	0
Garrett Groshek	9	35	0
Isiah Hennie	1	13	0
Madre London	2	7	0
Duane Gary	1	5	0
Maulers receiving
	Rec	Yds	TD
Isiah Hennie	8	55	0
Ishmael Hyman	3	18	0
Tre Walker	2	18	0
Mason Stokke	3	16	0
Garrett Groshek	2	13	0
Bailey Gaither	1	11	0
Madre London	3	9	0
Matt Seybert	1	6	0
Josh Simmons	1	−3	0

Birmingham statistics
Stallions passing
	C–A	Yds	TD–INT
Alex McGough	18–25	243	4–0
Stallions rushing
	Car	Yds	TD
Alex McGough	9	64	0
C. J. Marable	8	48	0
Ricky Person Jr.	6	38	0
Stallions receiving
	Rec	Yds	TD
Deon Cain	4	70	3
Jace Sternberger	3	65	0
Davion Davis	3	55	1
C. J. Marable	4	25	0
La'Michael Pettway	3	25	0
Josh Johnson	1	3	0

== Aftermath ==
Stallions wide receiver Deon Cain, previously named to the all-USFL team, was named the game's Most Valuable Player.

After the game, Fox officially announced that the league would return in April 2024, featuring the same eight teams that competed during the 2023 season.

== Broadcasting ==
=== United States ===
The game was televised by NBC and Peacock.

=== International ===
The USFL employed the help of DAZN for international streaming.

- In the United Kingdom and Ireland, the game was televised through Sky Sports.
- In Australia, the game was televised through Fox Sports Australia.
- In Hungary, the game was televised through Network4.
- In Northern Europe, the game was televised through Viaplay.

== See also ==
- UFL Championship Game
- USFL Championship Game
- XFL Championship Game
