= Birmingham Stallions (2022) =

Football team in Birmingham, Alabama

Logo	Wordmark
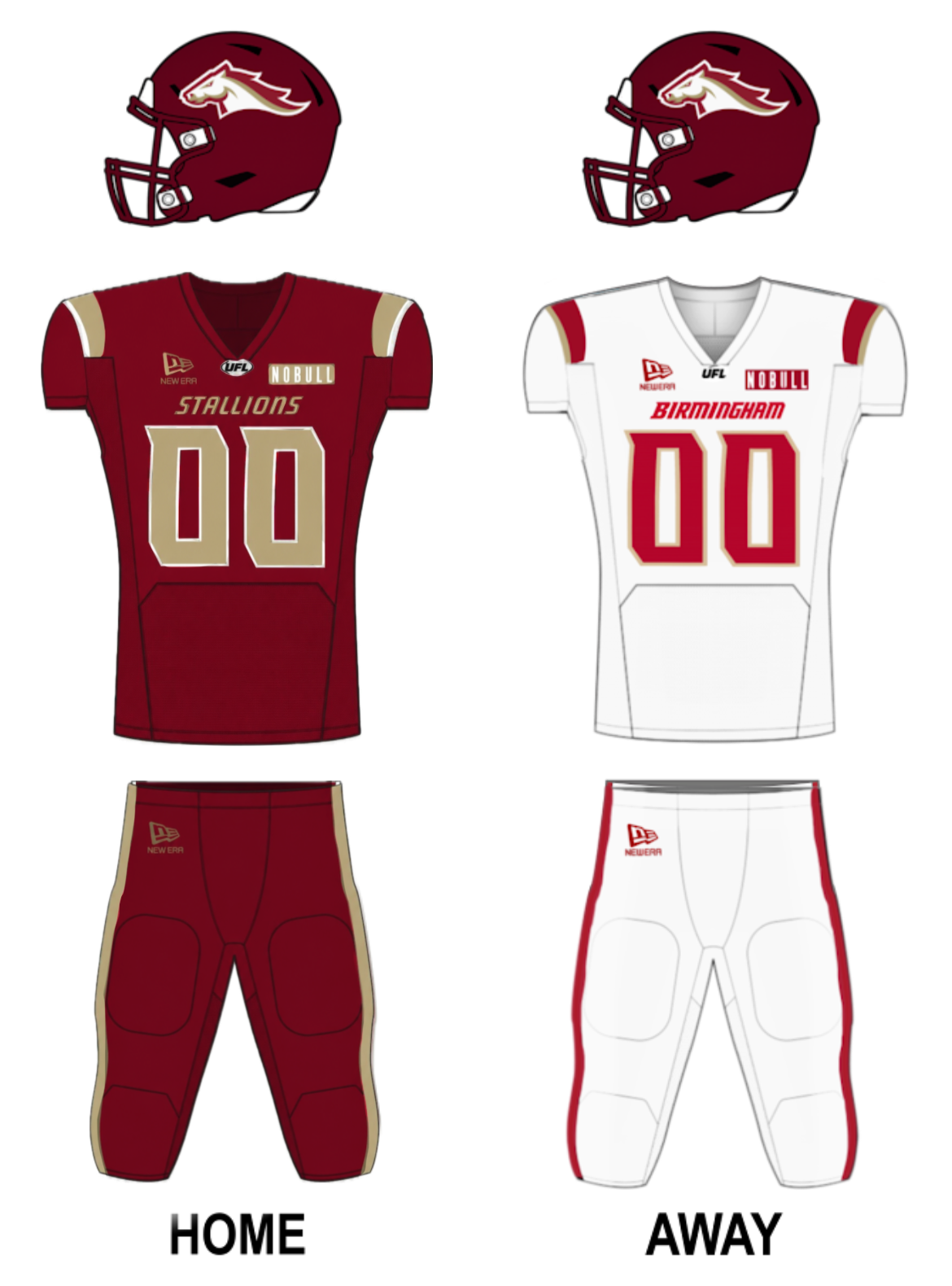
- Uniforms

General information
- Founded: November 22, 2021; 4 years ago
- Folded: 2026
- Stadium: Protective Stadium; Birmingham, Alabama
- Colors: Red, gold white
- Mascot: Stanley
- Website: www.theufl.com/teams/birmingham

Personnel
- Owner: League owned
- Head coach: A. J. McCarron

Team history
- Birmingham Stallions (2022–2026)

Home fields
- Legion Field (2022); Protective Stadium (2022–2026)

League / conference affiliations
- United States Football League (2022–2023): South Division (2022–2023); United Football League (2024–2026): USFL Conference (2024–2025)

Championships
- League championships: 3: USFL championships: 2022, 2023; UFL championships: 2024
- Conference championships: 3: USFL: 2022, 2023, 2024
- Division championships: 4: USFL South: 2022, 2023; UFL: 2024, 2025

Playoff appearances (4)
- USFL: 2022, 2023; UFL: 2024, 2025

The Birmingham Stallions were a professional American football team based in Birmingham, Alabama. The Stallions were a founding member of the second iteration of the United States Football League (USFL) in 2022, and competed in the United Football League (UFL) after the USFL merged with the XFL's second iteration. The Stallions were owned and operated by Dwayne Johnson's Alpha Acquico and Fox Corporation, and played their home games at Protective Stadium. They won three league championships, defeating the Philadelphia Stars 33–30 in 2022 and the Pittsburgh Maulers 28–12 in 2023 as part of the USFL, and finally the San Antonio Brahmas 25–0 in the inaugural UFL Championship Game in 2024. On July 30, 2026, the UFL announced that the league would leave Birmingham.

== History ==
The Birmingham Stallions were one of eight teams officially announced as a USFL franchise on The Herd with Colin Cowherd on November 22, 2021. On January 6, 2022, it was revealed that former NCAA coach Gene Chizik would become the head coach of the Stallions. Chizik confirmed the report, but the parties have yet to agree. He ultimately took a deal to become the defensive coordinator for North Carolina two days later. On January 20, 2022, it was announced on The Herd with Colin Cowherd that former NCAA football head coach Skip Holtz was named the head coach and general manager of the Stallions.

The Stallions finished the 2022 regular season with a 9–1 record, winning the South division title and clinching the South division's first seed. The Stallions hosted their first South Division Championship game, facing the second-seed New Orleans Breakers. The Stallions defeated the Breakers 31–17 and advanced to the 2022 USFL Championship Game.

On July 3, 2022, in Tom Benson Hall of Fame Stadium in Canton, Ohio, the Stallions played against the North division's second seed, the Philadelphia Stars. Following halftime, the Stallions led by eleven points, but a 4-yard Stars' touchdown narrowed the Stallions' lead to five points with 5:17 remaining in the third quarter. On the Stallions' next possession, they were forced to attempt a 38-yard field goal, which was missed. Then Philadelphia's Case Cookus found Devin Gray in the end zone for a touchdown two plays later. The Stars attempted and converted a two-point conversion. This gave Philadelphia a 23–20 lead, their first of the game. Following a pair of field goals and a 26–23 lead with under three minutes remaining, Scooby Wright had a 46-yard interception returned for a touchdown to seal the game for the Stallions effectively. Victor Bolden Jr. won the USFL Championship Game Most Valuable Player Award.

Following the 2022 season, the Stallions hired Zachary Potter. He previously held the title of team director during the Stallions 2022 season.

In September 2023, Axios reported that the XFL was in advanced talks with the USFL to merge the two leagues prior to the start of their 2024 seasons. Officials in Birmingham were assured that the Stallions would be part of the merged league should the union go forward. On September 28, 2023, the XFL and USFL announced their intent to merge, with details surrounding the merger to be announced at a later date. The merger would also require regulatory approval. In October 2023 the XFL filed a trademark application for the name "United Football League". On November 30, 2023, Garcia announced via her Instagram page that the leagues had received regulatory approval for the merger and were finalizing plans for a "combined season" to begin March 30, 2024. The merger was made official on December 31, 2023.

The Stallions continued to play in the UFL in 2024 and 2025, winning the inaugural UFL championship and eventually losing in the USFL conference championship in 2025. Relations between the UFL and Birmingham began to deteriorate in 2025, amid declining attendance, the moving of the league's hub from Birmingham to the XFL's former home in Arlington, Texas (and the resulting absence of the team from the city except on game days), and the eventual cancellation of plans to host the 2025 championship in Birmingham in favor of a second consecutive year in St. Louis. Birmingham mayor Randall Woodfin released a statement stating that he had been assured that the league had not yet decided to relocate out of Birmingham, contrary to reports that emerged in late July. Holtz stated that Birmingham "is our home (...) we're putting together a 2026 team for the Birmingham Stallions (...) until somebody tells us different." Stallions fans launched a campaign to save the team after the reports emerged. On August 16, incoming league co-owner Mike Repole responded favorably to the efforts and indicated that the Stallions were safe in Birmingham for at least the 2026 season but that the team would have to sell at least 15,000 tickets per game for the year to survive beyond that, aiming to sell 5,000 season ticket deposits. He also mentioned the possibility of moving in-market to Hoover Metropolitan Stadium to provide a more intimate experience and fuller stadium. On August 22, Repole acknowledged the 5,000 number was rhetorical and declared the campaign a success after 2,200 deposits (and a corporate suite sale) were collected, setting a goal of 20,000 tickets for the opening game at Protective Stadium, including his own. Repole defended his hostile attitude toward the Birmingham community in March 2026 as a means of engagement, stating "what have I got to lose?" The sales drive ended up selling over 15,000 tickets to the home opener, with seating capacity limited to under Repole's original 20,000-seat target.

With the discontinuation of the Michigan Panthers and Memphis Showboats in October 2025, the Stallions would have been the last remaining member of the 2022 USFL still using its USFL legacy brand; four days afterward, the Stallions would be joined by the Houston Gamblers reverting to their USFL branding. Head coach Skip Holtz, quarterback J'Mar Smith, tight end Jace Sternberger and running back C. J. Marable all announced their resignations within a two-week span in late December 2025, with wide receiver Amari Rodgers following suit in January. Under first-year head coach and former St. Louis Battlehawks quarterback A.J. McCarron, the Stallions missed the playoffs for the first time in the team's history in 2026, winning only four out of ten games.

Repole again expressed his dissatisfaction with the Stallions' stadium situation following the 2026 season, all but guaranteeing that the team would not play in Protective Stadium in 2027 because doing so would go against everything he wanted for the league. Officials with the Birmingham-Jefferson Civic Center Authority that operates the stadium, along with the city of Birmingham, noted that Repole had not contacted anyone in Birmingham before making his statements. The mayor of the suburb of Hoover, which owns and operates Hoover Metropolitan Stadium—the venue most closely fitting Repole's specifications for stadium capacity—preemptively rejected a proposal put forth by fans to play at that stadium, stating that it was booked through 2028 and would be in its baseball configuration during the UFL's spring season. This leaves the 6,700 (expandable to 10,000) seat Bobby Bowden Field at Pete Hanna Stadium, the on-campus home of the Samford Bulldogs football team in Homewood, as the only other option in the immediate Birmingham metropolitan area; neither the Hoover Metropolitan nor Pete Hanna Stadiam are the soccer-specific stadiums that Repole has historically preferred. Birmingham was conspicuously excluded from the seven job listings the UFL posted for team business directors in July 2026. The mayor of Montgomery, where the more appropriately-sized Cramton Bowl and ASU Stadium exist, offered to host the Stallions there to save the team's presence in Alabama, but Repole turned it down.

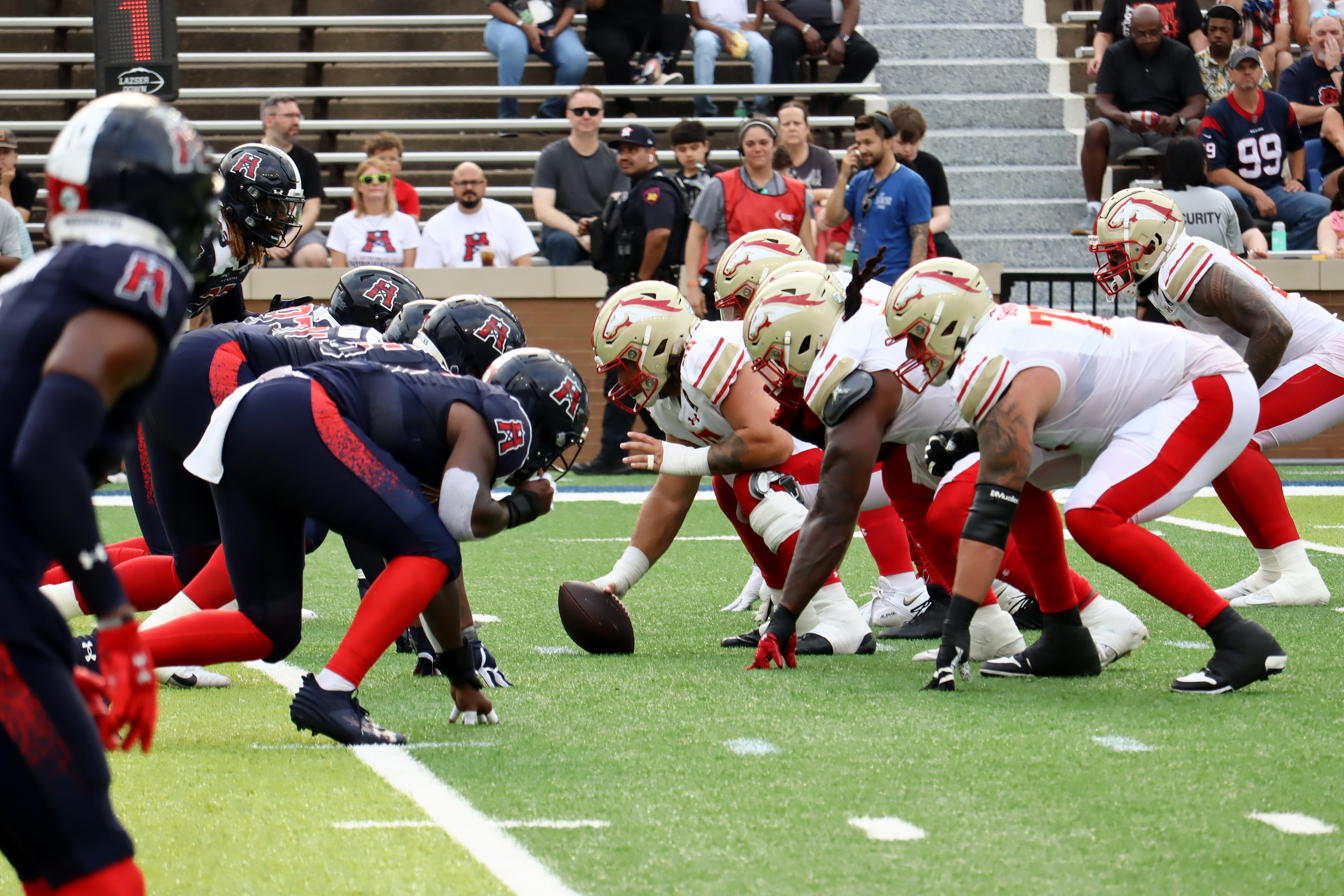
The Stallions (right) lined up on offense before a snap during a game against the Houston Roughnecks in 2024

On July 30, 2026, the UFL announced that the league would leave the cities of Birmingham and Houston. Repole once again singled out the large capacity of Protective Stadium as being a prime reason behind the league's departure. McCarron and the Birmingham roster under contract were transferred to the Rhode Island Breakers.

== Traditions ==
The Birmingham Stallions has an official supporters group, The Horsemen, as well as the newly inaugurated Pyramid of Flesh. Both groups are often recognized by the coaches and players.

=== The Horsemen ===
The Horsemen became the official fan base of the Birmingham Stallions at the beginning of the 2023 season. Stationed in Section 104 of Protective Stadium, The Horsemen are directly behind the home team's benches, allowing easy access and interaction with the players, coaches, and cheerleaders. The supporters group has been the creators of the many chants made during the games—"Giddy Up" and "Buck 'Em"—as well as crowning its team the "Kings of Spring," after the Stallions continues to win League Championships, and hands out crowns to all of the fans.

Many of the Horsemen travel to all of the away games, including the League Championship games; whereas, others remain in Birmingham to host watch parties that has attracted many fans as well as coverage from local media.

The Horsemen work with the team to create unique fan experiences, such as watch parties, signings, meet-and-greets, as well as working with the team to shop for and donate toys to the Children's of Alabama Hospital Sugar Plum Shop each year.

The local media often utilize the Horsemen as the spokespeople for the fan base, ensuring all fans are informed of local events and updates on the season. Coach Skip Holtz often refers to the Horsemen and how the fan base creates an electric environment at both home and away games and how much he appreciates the fans.

After the 2023 USFL Championship, the Horsemen led the team and cheerleaders in the celebration parade.

=== Pyramid of Flesh (a.k.a. Shirtless Stallions) ===
On April 20, 2024, the Stallions hosted a game against the D.C. Defenders at Protective Stadium in Birmingham, AL. With 1:55 remaining in the first half, the game was halted for a lightning delay. By the time play resumed nearly 90 minutes later, most fans had left the stadium. However of the few devoted fans who remained, a group of men had gathered near the North endzone, taking off their wet shirts and cheering enthusiastically. Having received such significant air time in the game broadcast, a tradition was born. Later dubbed the "Pyramid of Flesh", during each home game at the front row of Section 138 a small group of shirtless fans begins to gather. By the end of most games the Pyramid of Flesh has typically grown to include several dozen fans as well as the Stallions' mascot, Stanley.

== Championships ==
The Stallions have won two USFL Championships and one UFL Championship as well as two (USFL) South Division Championships and one (UFL) USFL Conference Championship, winning three championships in a row from 2022 to 2024.

=== USFL Championships ===
Year	Coach	USFL Championship Game	Stadium	Location	Opponent	Score	MVP	Record
2022	Skip Holtz	2022	Tom Benson Hall of Fame Stadium	Canton, Ohio	Philadelphia Stars	33–30	Victor Bolden Jr.	9–1
2023	Skip Holtz	2023	Tom Benson Hall of Fame Stadium	Canton, Ohio	Pittsburgh Maulers	28–12	Deon Cain	8–2
Total USFL championships won:								2

=== UFL Championship ===
Year	Coach	UFL Championship Game	Stadium	Location	Opponent	Score	MVP	Record
2024	Skip Holtz	2024	The Dome at America's Center	St. Louis, Missouri	San Antonio Brahmas	25–0	Adrian Martinez	9–1
Total UFL championships won:								1

=== South Division Championship games ===
Year	Coach	Stadium	Location	Opponent	Score	Record
2022	Skip Holtz	Tom Benson Hall of Fame Stadium	Canton, Ohio	New Orleans Breakers	31–17	9–1
2023	Skip Holtz	Protective Stadium	Birmingham, Alabama	New Orleans Breakers	47–22	8–2
Total South Division championship games won:						2

=== USFL Conference Championship game ===
Year	Coach	Stadium	Location	Opponent	Score	Record
2024	Skip Holtz	Protective Stadium	Birmingham, Alabama	Michigan Panthers	31–18	9–1
Total USFL Conference championship games won:						1

== Player history ==
=== Current NFL players ===
Season	Pos	Name	NFL team
2022–2023	K	Brandon Aubrey	Dallas Cowboys
2022–2024	DE	Dondrea Tillman	Denver Broncos
2024	WR	Kevin Austin Jr.	New Orleans Saints
2025	K	Harrison Mevis	Los Angeles Rams
2026	K	Anders Carlson	Green Bay Packers

=== Notable players ===
Season	Pos	Name	Notes
2023–2025	TE	Jace Sternberger	Former Green Bay Packers Tight End, 2019 3rd Round Pick
2024–2025	WR	Amari Rodgers	Former Green Bay Packers Wide Receiver, 2021 3rd Round Pick
2024–2026	QB	Matt Corral	Former Carolina Panthers Quarterback, 2022 3rd Round Pick
2024	DE	Taco Charlton	Former Dallas Cowboys Defensive End, 2017 1st Round Pick
2026	RB	Anthony McFarland	Former Pittsburgh Steelers Running back, 2020 4th Round Pick
2026	WR	Jaydon Mickens	Former Tampa Bay Buccaneers wide receiver
2026	WR	Laviska Shenault	Former Jacksonville Jaguars wide receiver, 2020 2nd Round Pick
2026	OT	Jackson Carman	Former Cincinnati Bengals offensive tackle, 2021 2nd Round Pick
2026	WR	John Ross	Former Cincinnati Bengals wide receiver, 2017 1st Round Pick
2026	QB	Dorian Thompson-Robinson	Former Cleveland Browns Quarterback, 2023 5th Round Pick

=== MVP award winners ===
Stallions USFL MVP winners
Year	Player	Position	Selector
2023	Alex McGough	QB	USFL
2024	Adrian Martinez	QB	UFL

== Coach history ==
=== Head coach history ===
#	Name	Term	Regular season				Playoffs			Awards
#	Name	Term	GC	W	L	Win %	GC	W	L	Awards
Birmingham Stallions
1	Skip Holtz	2022–2025	40	33	7	.825	7	6	1	*2023 USFL Coach of the Year
2	A. J. McCarron	2026	10	4	6	.400	–	–	–	

=== Offensive coordinator history ===
#	Name	Term	Regular season				Playoffs			Notes
#	Name	Term	GC	W	L	Win %	GC	W	L	Notes
Birmingham Stallions
1	Skip Holtz	2022–2025	40	33	7	.825	7	6	1	*Co-Offensive Coordinator with Philip Montgomery
2	Philip Montgomery	2024	10	9	1	.900	2	2	0	*Co-Offensive Coordinator with Skip Holtz
3	Tyler Siskey	2026	10	4	6	.400	–	–	–	

*Holtz also serving as Offensive Coordinator

=== Defensive coordinator history ===
#	Name	Term	Regular season				Playoffs			Awards
#	Name	Term	GC	W	L	Win %	GC	W	L	Awards
Birmingham Stallions
1	John Chavis	2022–2024	27	24	3	.889	5	5	0	
2	Corey Chamblin	2024–2025	10	7	3	.700	3	2	1	
3	Kevin Sherrer	2026	10	4	6	.400	–	–	–	

*Chavis left team Week 9 of the 2024 season

== Records ==
All-time Stallions leaders
Leader	Player	Record	Years with Stallions
Passing yards	Alex McGough	2,654 passing yards	2022–2023, 2025
Passing Touchdowns	Alex McGough	24 passing touchdowns	2022–2023, 2025
Rushing yards	C. J. Marable	1,441 rushing yards	2022–2025
Rushing Touchdowns	C. J. Marable	13 rushing touchdowns	2022–2025
Receiving yards	Deon Cain	1,427 receiving yards	2022–present
Receiving Touchdowns	Jace Sternberger; Deon Cain	13 receiving touchdowns	2023–2025; 2022–2026
Receptions	Deon Cain	103 receptions	2022–2026
Tackles	DeMarquis Gates	141 tackles	2022, 2024–2025
Sacks	Carlos Davis	9 sacks	2024–2025
Interceptions	A. J. Thomas	4 interceptions	2024–2025
Coaching wins	Skip Holtz	31 wins	2022–2025

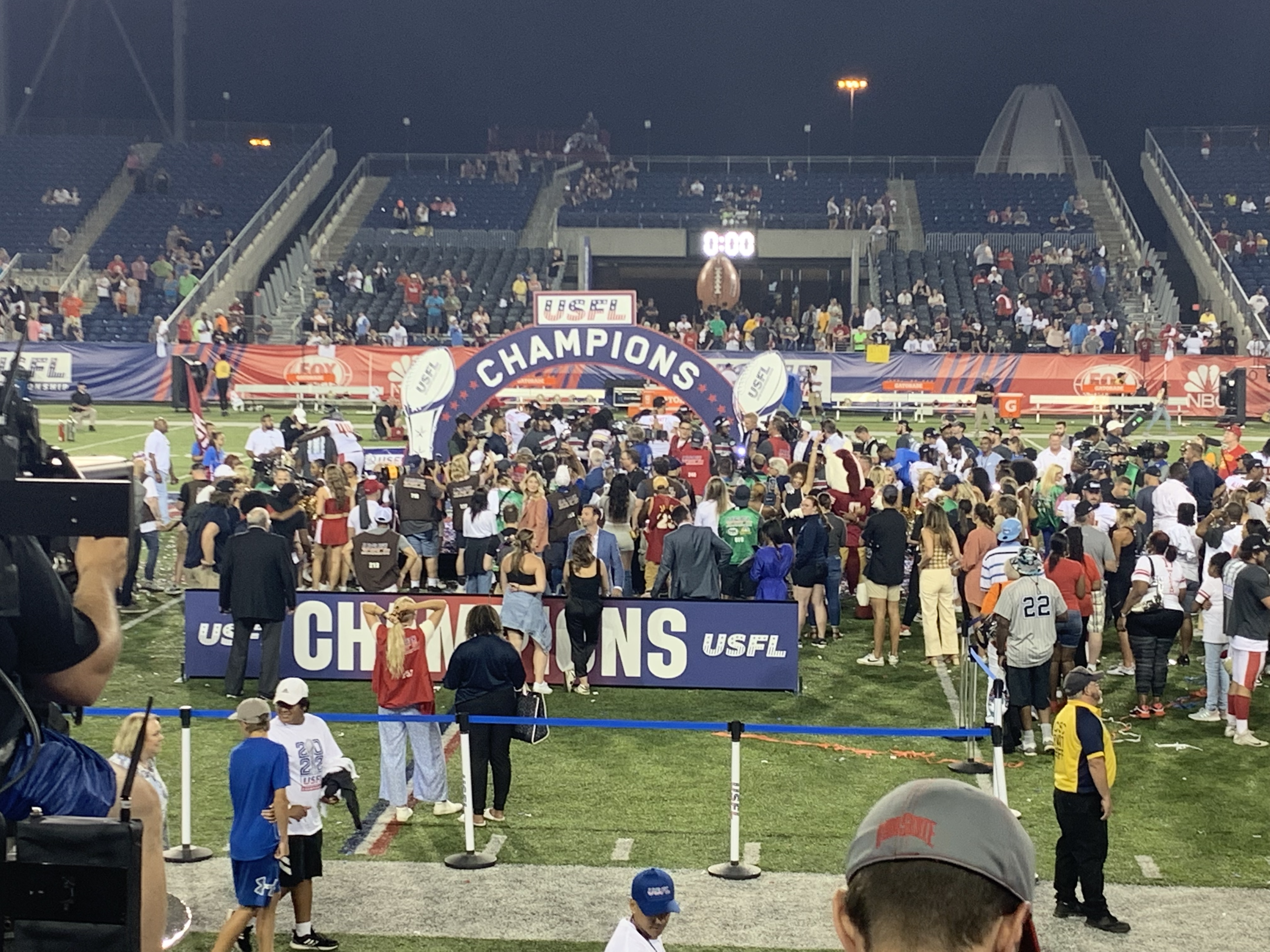
2022 USFL Championship trophy presentation

=== Starting quarterbacks ===
Regular season – As of June 16, 2026

Season(s)	Quarterback(s)	Notes	Ref
2022	J'Mar Smith (6–1) / Alex McGough (3–0)		
2023	Alex McGough (7–2) / J'Mar Smith (1–0)		
2024	Adrian Martinez (6–1) / Matt Corral (3–0)		
2025	Matt Corral (2–0) / Alex McGough (1–1) / Case Cookus (2–1) / J'Mar Smith (2–1)		
2026	Matt Corral (1–3) / Dorian Thompson-Robinson (3–3)		

Postseason

Season(s)	Quarterback(s)	Notes	Ref
2022	J'Mar Smith (2–0)		
2023	Alex McGough (2–0)		
2024	Adrian Martinez (2–0)		
2025	J'Mar Smith (0–1)		

Most games as starting quarterback

Name	Period	GP	GS	W	L	Pct
Alex McGough	2022–2023, 2025	19	14	11	3	.786
J'Mar Smith	2022–2025	18	11	9	2	.818
Adrian Martinez	2024	10	7	6	1	.857
Matt Corral	2024–2026	10	6	6	3	.667
Dorian Thompson-Robinson	2026	6	6	3	3	.500
Case Cookus	2025	4	3	2	1	.667

=== Attendance ===
Top 10 Crowds
Ranking	Attendance	Date	Score
1	18,340	April 18, 2026	Stallions 0, Storm 16
2	14,056	May 11, 2024	Stallions 30, Battlehawks 26
3	12,265	April 13, 2024	Stallions 33, Showboats 14
4	10,928	June 8, 2025	Stallions 29, Panthers 44
5	10,344	May 24, 2025	Stallions 26, Panthers 23
6	10,287	June 8, 2024	Stallions 31, Panthers 18
7	10,245	May 18, 2024	Stallions 35, Roughnecks 28
8	10,126	April 11, 2025	Stallions 10. Renegades 9
9	9,627	May 4, 2025	Stallions 26, Brahmas 3
10	9,127	April 25, 2025	Stalions 20, Showboats 24

=== Year by year ===
Season	Head Coach	League	Avg. Crowd	Home Record
2024	Skip Holtz	UFL	10,255	5–0
2025	Skip Holtz	UFL	8,794	4–1
2026	A. J. McCarron	UFL	8,248	2–3

== Statistics and records ==
=== Season by season record ===
UFL champions^{†} (2024–present)	USFL champions^{§} (2022–2023)	Conference champions^{*}	Division champions^{^}	Wild Card berth^{#}

Season	Team	League	Conference	Division	Regular season			Postseason results	Awards	Head coaches	Pct.
Season	Team	League	Conference	Division	Finish	W	L	Postseason results	Awards	Head coaches	Pct.
2022	2022	USFL^{§}	—N/a	South^{^}	1st^{#}	9	1	Won Division Finals (Breakers) 31–17; Won USFL Championship (Stars) 33–30	J'Mar Smith (SDF MVP); Victor Bolden Jr. (CG MVP)	Skip Holtz	.830
2023	2023	USFL^{§}	—N/a	South^{^}	1st^{#}	8	2	Won Division Finals (Breakers) 47–22; Won USFL Championship (Maulers) 28–12	Alex McGough (USFL MVP); Skip Holtz (COTY); Deon Cain (CG MVP)	Skip Holtz	.830
2024	2024	UFL^{†}	USFL^{*}	—N/a	1st^{#}	9	1	Won USFL Conference Championship (Panthers) 31–18; Won UFL Championship (Brahmas) 25–0	Adrian Martinez (UFL MVP)	Skip Holtz	.830
2025	2025	UFL	USFL	—N/a	1st^{#}	7	3	Lost USFL Conference Championship (Panthers) 29–44		Skip Holtz	.830
2026	2026	UFL	—N/a	—N/a	6th	4	6			A. J. McCarron	.400
Total						37	13	All-time regular season record (2022–2026)			.740
Total						6	1	All-time postseason record (2022–2026)			.857
Total						43	14	All-time regular season and postseason record (2022–2026)			.754
Total						2 USFL Championship titles, 1 UFL Championship title, 4 division titles, 3 conference title					

=== Rivalries ===
==== Double Down Derby ====
The Birmingham Stallions were assigned a rivalry with the Houston Gamblers in 2022. This rivalry was called the Double Down Derby. The Stallions accrued a 6–4 record against the Gamblers.

==== St. Louis Battlehawks ====
With the merger of the XFL and USFL, the Stallions and St. Louis Battlehawks emerged as rivals, both because each had reached the top of their division at the time of their Week 7 meeting in the 2024 UFL season and because both of the Battlehawks' quarterbacks, Alabama alumnus McCarron and Troy alumnus Brandon Silvers, played college and high school football in the state of Alabama. The 2024 matchup between the Stallions and Battlehawks was the highest-attended matchup in Birmingham for which attendance figures had been made public, except for the 2026 season opener. Further adding heat to the rivalry, McCarron accepted the head coaching position with the Stallions after a somewhat acrimonious departure from St. Louis. The matchups between Birmingham and St. Louis were among the highest viewed on television of all UFL regular season contests. The Stallions were 1–2 against the Battlehawks.

==== Franchise matchup history ====
Team	Record	Pct.
Columbus Aviators	1–1	.500
Dallas Renegades	3–0	1.000
DC Defenders	1–2	.333
Houston Gamblers	6–4	.600
Louisville Kings	1–0	1.000
Michigan Panthers	7–1	.875
Memphis Showboats	5–1	.833
New Jersey Generals	2–0	1.000
New Orleans Breakers	5–1	.833
Orlando Storm	1–1	.500
Pittsburgh Maulers	3–0	1.000
Philadelphia Stars	3–0	1.000
San Antonio Brahmas	2–1	.667
St. Louis Battlehawks	1–2	.333
Tampa Bay Bandits	2–0	1.000

- Defunct teams in light gray.
