= 2025 San Antonio Brahmas season =

American professional football season

- Owner: Alpha Acquico, LLC
- General manager: Marc Lillibridge
- Head coach: Wade Phillips (week 1-3); Payton Pardee (week 4-10)
- Home stadium: Alamodome

Results
- Record: 1–9
- Conference place: 4th in XFL Conference
- Playoffs: Did not qualify

Uniform

The 2025 San Antonio Brahmas season was the third season for the San Antonio Brahmas as a professional American football franchise and the second season in the United Football League (UFL). The Brahmas played their home games at the Alamodome and head coach Wade Phillips returned for his second year.

Phillips missed much of the offseason due to declining health. After a 0–2 start to the season, Offensive Coordinator A. J. Smith resigned. Special teams coordinator and wide receivers coach Payton Pardee was promoted to fulfill the vacancy. In week three, Phillips suffered a medical emergency during the Brahmas' April 13 game against the Michigan Panthers, forcing Pardee to take over head coaching duties for the remainder of the game. Phillips then took a personal leave of absence for the remainder of the 2025 season on April 16, 2025, naming Pardee as his successor. Smith later remarked there was an internal power struggle in the Brahmas organization that led to his resignation.

In Pardees first full game as interim head coach, the Brahmas defeated the eventual UFL champions, the DC Defenders, by a score of 24–18. After losing the following week to Houston, starting quarterback Kellen Mond was replaced by Kevin Hogan. Hogan was winless in his three starts and unavailable for the final two games due to an injury. Mond returned as the starter and Brahmas ended the season on a six-game losing streak.

The Brahmas finished the season 1–9, six wins less from the 2024 season. All-UFL Team running back Jashaun Corbin led the league with 514 rushing yards despite having five games with under ten carries. All-UFL Team linebacker Tavante Beckett led the league with 89 tackles. Punter Brad Wing was named All-UFL Team while returners Mathew Sexton and Jaden Shirden won Special Teams Player of the Week awards in week four and nine, respectively.

== Offseason ==
Due to scheduling conflicts at the Alamodome during the first 4 weeks of the season, the Brahmas first home game was in Week 5 vs the Houston Roughnecks. Those schedule conflicts also force the Brahmas to be able to only play 4 home games at the Alamodome. Their week 9 matchup against the St. Louis Battlehawks was a designated home game for the Brahmas, but was played at The Dome at America's Center in St. Louis.

== Roster ==
2025 San Antonio Brahmas final roster
Quarterbacks: 3 Alan Bowman; 18 Jarrett Guarantano; 8 Kevin Hogan; 12 Kellen Mond; Running backs: 6 Jashaun Corbin; 7 John Lovett; 41 Anthony McFarland Jr.; 27 Aidan Robbins; 26 Jaden Shirden; Wide receivers: 4 Dee Anderson; 16 Jacob Harris; 81 Ra'Shaun Henry; 13 Jontre Kirklin; 5 Marquez Stevenson; 17 Greg Ward; Tight ends: 82 Thomas Gordon; 88 Alizé Mack; 85 Steven Stilianos	Offensive linemen: 77 Chuck Filiaga G; 53 Lamont Gaillard G; 73 Vitaliy Gurman C; 68 Zuri Henry T; 74 Derrick Kelly G; 67 Aaron Monteiro G; 71 Sam Tecklenburg C; 66 Willie Tyler III T; Defensive linemen: 19 David Anenih DE; 95 Isaiah Buggs DE; 96 Nelson Ceaser DE; 98 Prince Emili DT; 90 Matthew Gotel DT; 44 Marcus Haynes DE; 52 Kobe Jones DE; 92 Rashard Lawrence DT; 91 Garrett Nelson DE; 93 Jacob Sykes DE/DT	Linebackers: 1 Tavante Beckett; 20 Storey Jackson; 43 Paul Moala; 15 Jordan Williams; Defensive backs: 32 Henry Black FS; 25 Jalen Elliott FS; 29 Sean Fresch CB; 21 William Hooper CB; 28 Corey Mayfield Jr. CB; 23 Jordan Mosley SS; 35 Kary Vincent Jr. CB; Special teams: 46 Cam Lyons LS; 14 Tristan Vizcaino K; 9 Brad Wing P	Reserve lists: -- Robert Barnes Retired; 11 Donald De La Haye K (IR); -- Jordan Ferguson DE Retired; 30 Hassan Hall RB (Susp.); 80 Racey McMath WR (IR); 87 Mathew Sexton WR (IR); 31 Nate Wieland ILB (IR); 50 active, 7 inactive

== Staff ==
San Antonio Brahmas Staff
Front office: General manager – Marc Lillibridge; Head coach: Head coach / offensive coordinator - Payton Pardee; Offensive coaches: Running backs – Jesse Thompson; Wide receivers – Cody Latimer; Tight ends / special teams - Jack Welch; Offensive Line – Marvin Williams	Defensive coaches: Defensive coordinator – Will Reed; Defensive line – Chris Achuff; Linebackers – Derrick Berry; Defensive backs – Josh Jones

== Draft ==
The UFL held its first draft since the creation of the league on July 17, 2024.

Rnd	Pick No.	Player	Pos.	College
1	7	Gabe Hall	DT	Maryland
2	15	Gabriel Murphy	DE	UCLA
3	23	Donovan Jennings	OT	South Florida
4	31	Miles Battle	CB	Utah
5	39	Jamree Kromah	DE	James Madison
6	47	Lideatrick Griffin	WR	Mississippi State
7	55	Beau Brade	S	Maryland
8	63	Sincere Haynesworth	C	Tulane
9	71	D. J. Miller Jr.	CB	Kent State
10	79	Joshua Cephus	WR	UTSA

== Schedule ==
All times Central

Week	Day	Date	Kickoff	TV	Opponent	Results		Location	Attendance
Week	Day	Date	Kickoff	TV	Opponent	Score	Record	Location	Attendance
1	Saturday	March 29	3:00 p.m.	Fox	at Arlington Renegades	L 9–33	0–1	Choctaw Stadium	10,114
2	Sunday	April 6	5:30 p.m.	FS1	at St. Louis Battlehawks	L 9–26	0–2	The Dome at America's Center	32,115
3	Sunday	April 13	11:00 a.m.	ABC	at Michigan Panthers	L 23–26	0–3	Ford Field	11,013
4	Sunday	April 20	4:00 p.m.	Fox	at DC Defenders	W 24–18	1–3	Audi Field	12,474
5	Sunday	April 27	2:00 p.m.	ESPN	Houston Roughnecks	L 3–27	1–4	Alamodome	14,427
6	Sunday	May 4	3:00 p.m.	Fox	at Birmingham Stallions	L 3–26	1–5	Protective Stadium	9,627
7	Friday	May 9	7:00 p.m.	Fox	DC Defenders	L 24–32	1–6	Alamodome	9,884
8	Friday	May 16	7:00 p.m.	Fox	Memphis Showboats	L 22–24 (OT)	1–7	Alamodome	9,244
9	Friday	May 23	7:00 p.m.	Fox	at St. Louis Battlehawks (Note: This game was original intended to be played in San Antonio but was shifted to be played in St. Louis due to scheduling conflicts at the Alamodome. San Antonio was the designated home team for this game.)	L 13–39	1–8	The Dome at America's Center	27,890
10	Sunday	June 1	11:00 a.m.	ABC	Arlington Renegades	L 6–23	1–9	Alamodome	10,863

== Standings ==
2025 UFL standings
USFL Conference
Team	W	L	PCT	GB	TD+/-	TD+	TD-	DIV	PF	PA	DIFF	STK
(y) Birmingham Stallions	7	3	.700	–	8	28	20	5–1	244	167	77	W2
(x) Michigan Panthers	6	4	.600	1	8	30	22	3–3	245	198	47	L2
(e) Houston Roughnecks	5	5	.500	2	0	22	22	3–3	183	201	-18	W2
(e) Memphis Showboats	2	8	.200	5	-13	15	28	1–5	148	246	-98	L2
XFL Conference
Team	W	L	PCT	GB	TD+/-	TD+	TD-	DIV	PF	PA	DIFF	STK
(y) St. Louis Battlehawks	8	2	.800	–	7	26	19	4–2	231	163	68	W6
(x) DC Defenders	6	4	.600	2	3	28	25	4–2	225	224	1	L2
(e) Arlington Renegades	5	5	.500	3	4	23	19	3–3	229	168	61	W2
(e) San Antonio Brahmas	1	9	.100	7	-17	14	31	1–5	136	274	-138	L6
(x)–clinched playoff berth; (y)–clinched conference; (e)–eliminated from playoff contention
