= Payton Pardee =

American football coach (born 1996)

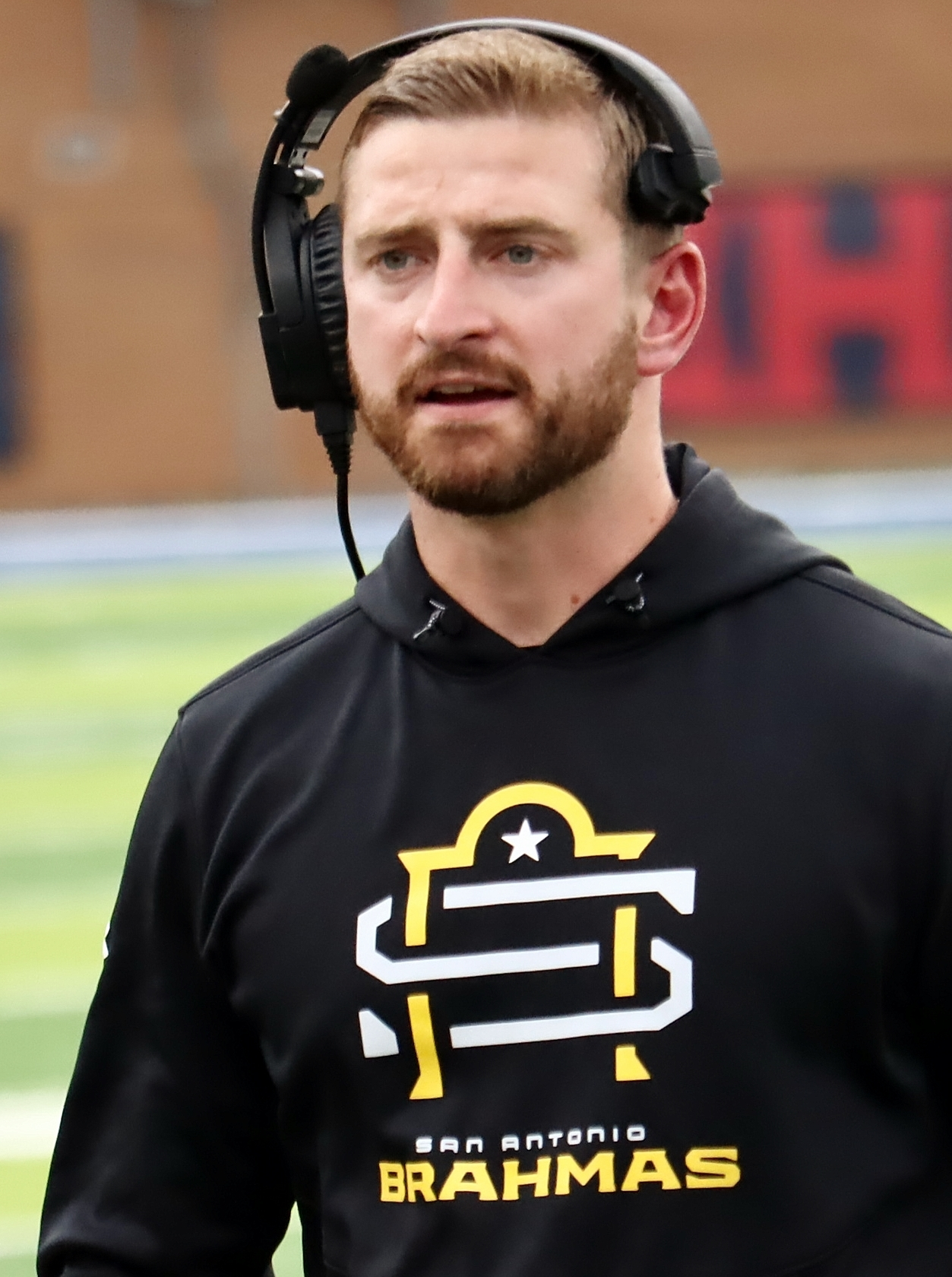
- Pardee with the San Antonio Brahmas in 2024

Current position
- Title: Special teams coordinator & tight ends coach
- Team: UTEP
- Conference: Mountain West

Biographical details
- Born: December 2, 1996 (age 29)

Playing career
- 2015–2018: Houston
- Position: Wide receiver

Coaching career (HC unless noted)
- 2019–2020: Texas A&M–Commerce (WR)
- 2021–2022: Texas A&M–Commerce (TE/RC)
- 2023: Houston Roughnecks (WR)
- 2024–2025: San Antonio Brahmas (ST/WR)
- 2025: San Antonio Brahmas (OC/QB)
- 2025: San Antonio Brahmas (interim HC)
- 2026–present: UTEP (ST/TE)

Head coaching record
- Overall: 1–6 (XFL)

Payton Pardee (born December 2, 1996) is an American football coach. He previously served as the head coach for the San Antonio Brahmas. Pardee also played college football at Houston.

== Coaching career ==
In 2019, Pardee was hired by East Texas A&M to be their wide receivers coach.

In 2022, Pardee was hired by the Houston Roughnecks of the XFL to be their wide receivers coach under Wade Phillips.

In 2023 during the merger of the XFL and the United States Football League, Pardee followed Phillips to the San Antonio Brahmas.

In April 2025, Pardee was promoted to offensive coordinator after A. J. Smith resigned. Smith had later remarked that Pardee had won an internal power struggle in the Brahmas organization, one that had formed because of Wade Phillips's declining health and frequent absences from the team in the preseason.

Just one week later on April 16, 2025, Pardee was named the team's interim head coach after Wade Phillips took a leave of absence, making him the youngest Head Coach in the modern era of professional football (excluding the player-coaches of the 1920s). Pardee had technically taken over as interim head coach during his first game as offensive coordinator on April 13, after Phillips had suffered a medical emergency and left the game at halftime.

In January 2026, Pardee was named the tight ends coach at University of Texas El Paso.

== Head coaching record ==
=== UFL ===
League	Team	Year	Regular season				Postseason			
League	Team	Year	Won	Lost	Win %	Finish	Won	Lost	Win %	Result
UFL	SA	2025	1	6	.143	4th in XFL Conference	—	—	—	—
Total			1	6	.143		0	0	–	

== Personal life ==
Pardee is the grandson of former Houston Oilers head coach Jack Pardee. His father, Ted Pardee, played college football at Houston and currently serves as that team's radio color commentator. His brother Luke Pardee played quarterback at Texas Christian, and is currently quarterbacks coach at Incarnate Word.
