= Mathew Sexton =

American football player (born 1997)

No. 86 – Saskatchewan Roughriders
- Position: Wide receiver
- Roster status: Active roster
- CFL status: American

Personal information
- Born: October 17, 1997 (age 29); Clinton, Michigan, U.S.
- Listed height: 5 ft 10 in (1.78 m)
- Listed weight: 176 lb (80 kg)

Career information
- High school: Clinton
- College: Eastern Michigan (2016–2019)
- NFL draft: 2020: undrafted

Career history
- Pittsburgh Steelers (2021)*; Kansas City Chiefs (2022)*; Vegas Vipers (2023); Atlanta Falcons (2023)*; New England Patriots (2023)*; Miami Dolphins (2024)*; San Antonio Brahmas (2025); Ottawa Redblacks (2026)*; Saskatchewan Roughriders (2026–present)
- * Offseason or practice squad member only
- Stats at Pro Football Reference

Mathew Sexton (born October 17, 1997) is an American professional football wide receiver for the Saskatchewan Roughriders of the Canadian Football League (CFL). He played college football at Eastern Michigan, and has also played for the Pittsburgh Steelers, Kansas City Chiefs, Atlanta Falcons of the National Football League (NFL), and the Vegas Vipers of the XFL.

== College career ==
Sexton began his true freshman season as a reserve wide receiver and contributed on special teams. He made his collegiate debut in the 2016 season opener against Mississippi Valley State in a victory. On the season, he appeared in eight games, recording three receptions for 51 yards while returning three kicks for 41 yards and making four tackles.

As a sophomore in 2017, Sexton appeared in 12 games and made two starts. He made his first career start in Week 2 against Ohio, a loss, and made his second start of the season in Week 4 against Army, where he recorded his first collegiate touchdown on an eight-yard reception from Brogan Roback in a 28–27 loss. In Week 8 against Northern Illinois, Sexton blocked a punt that was recovered by teammate Jaron Johnson in the end zone for a touchdown in a loss. On the season, he recorded 26 receptions for 357 yards and two touchdowns. He also served as the Eagles' primary kickoff returner, leading the team with 18 returns for 312 yards while adding 14 tackles.

As a junior in 2018, Sexton became a starting wide receiver. He made an immediate impact, recording receiving touchdowns in the first two weeks of the season in victories over Monmouth and Purdue. In the upset victory over Purdue, he recorded a season-high 81 receiving yards on three receptions, including a 75-yard touchdown. Sexton appeared in and started 12 of the Eagles' 13 games as they reached the Camellia Bowl against Georgia Southern, where he blocked a punt. He finished the season with 37 receptions for 419 yards and three touchdowns.

During the 2019 season, Sexton recorded a career-high seven receptions for 54 yards in a Week 2 loss to Kentucky. The following week against Illinois, he recorded a 54-yard touchdown reception in a 34–31 upset victory, marking the third time during his Eastern Michigan career that the Eagles defeated a Big Ten Conference opponent. The following week against Central Connecticut State, Sexton made another key special teams play, blocking a punt, recovering the loose ball, and returning it for a touchdown with 10 seconds remaining to give Eastern Michigan a 34–29 victory. On the season, he appeared in 11 games with 11 starts, missing the regular-season finale and the 2019 Quick Lane Bowl due to injury. He finished the year with 34 receptions for 508 yards and four touchdowns.

In his Eastern Michigan career, Sexton appeared in 43 games with 25 starts, recording 100 receptions for 1,335 yards and nine touchdowns. He also contributed on special teams with 26 tackles and three blocked punts.

== Professional career ==
Pre-draft measurables
Height	Weight	Arm length	Hand span	Wingspan	40-yard dash	10-yard split	20-yard split	20-yard shuttle	Three-cone drill	Vertical jump	Broad jump	Bench press
5 ft 9 3/4 in (1.77 m)	176 lb (80 kg)	29 3/8 in (0.75 m)	9 in (0.23 m)	5 ft 8 1/2 in (1.74 m)	4.44 s	1.54 s	2.60 s	4.34 s	7.14 s	34.5 in (0.88 m)	10 ft 2 in (3.10 m)	14 reps
All values from Pro Day

=== Pittsburgh Steelers ===
After going undrafted in the 2020 NFL draft, Sexton joined The Spring League's Aviators in 2020. In Week 2, he recorded a walk-off game-winning punt return touchdown in overtime to defeat the Blues 23–17. The following week against the Conquerors, he returned the opening kickoff 90 yards for a touchdown in a loss. Sexton signed with the Pittsburgh Steelers on March 31, 2021. He was released on August 28, 2021.

=== Kansas City Chiefs ===
On January 11, 2022, Sexton signed a future contract with the Kansas City Chiefs. He was released on June 23, 2022, but reverted to Injured Reserve. He was released on July 23, 2023.

=== Vegas Vipers ===
On November 16, 2022, Sexton was drafted by the Vegas Vipers of the XFL. He finished the 2023 season playing in 8 games with 23 receptions and 326 receiving yards.

=== Atlanta Falcons ===
On August 4, 2023, Sexton signed with the Atlanta Falcons. He was released on August 30, 2022, but was re-signed to the practice squad. He was released on September 19, 2023.

=== New England Patriots ===
On November 29, 2023, the New England Patriots signed Sexton to their practice squad, but was released the next day.

=== Miami Dolphins ===
On January 17, 2024, Sexton signed a future contract with the Miami Dolphins but was waived on June 18, 2024.

=== San Antonio Brahmas ===
On August 27, 2024, Sexton signed with the San Antonio Brahmas of the United Football League (UFL). In Week 4 of the 2025 UFL season, Sexton returned a punt 83 yards for a touchdown. He totaled 107 all purpose yards and was announced as the UFL special teams player of the week. He was placed on injured reserve on May 19, 2025.

=== Ottawa Redblacks ===
On February 13, 2026, Sexton signed with the Ottawa Redblacks of the Canadian Football League (CFL). He was released on May 9.

=== Saskatchewan Roughriders ===
On May 12, 2026, Sexton joined the Saskatchewan Roughriders as a training camp signing. In his CFL debut against Ottawa, Sexton returned a punt 101 yards for a go-ahead touchdown in the second half, helping the Roughriders to a 27–22 victory.

== Career statistics ==
=== Professional ===
Season	Team	League	Games		Receiving				Kick returns				Punt returns			
Season	Team	League	GP	GS	Rec	Yds	Avg	TD	Ret	Yds	Avg	TD	Ret	Yds	Avg	TD
2023	VGS	XFL	10	3	23	364	15.8	0	3	49	16.3	0	13	101	7.8	0
2025	SA	UFL	4	1	3	15	5.0	0	1	20	20.0	0	8	154	19.3	1
Career			14	4	26	379	14.6	0	4	69	17.3	0	21	255	12.1	1

=== College ===
College statistics
Season	Team	Games		Receiving				Rushing				Kick returns				Punt returns			
Season	Team	GP	GS	Rec	Yds	Avg	TD	Att	Yds	Avg	TD	Ret	Yds	Avg	TD	Ret	Yds	Avg	TD
2016	Eastern Michigan	8	0	3	51	17.0	0	1	9	9.0	0	3	41	13.7	0	—	—	—	—
2017	Eastern Michigan	12	2	26	357	13.7	2	—	—	—	—	18	312	17.3	0	1	27	27.0	0
2018	Eastern Michigan	12	12	37	419	11.3	3	—	—	—	—	—	—	—	—	—	—	—	—
2019	Eastern Michigan	11	11	34	508	14.9	4	5	14	2.8	0	—	—	—	—	1	50	50.0	1
Career		43	25	100	1,335	13.4	9	6	23	3.8	0	21	353	16.8	0	2	77	38.5	1
