= Houston Roughnecks =

The Houston Roughnecks, may refer to:

- Houston Roughnecks (XFL), a former XFL team (2020–2023).
- Houston Roughnecks (UFL), a former name (2024–2025) of the Houston Gamblers, a current UFL team
