= Jalen Elliott =

American football player (born 1998)

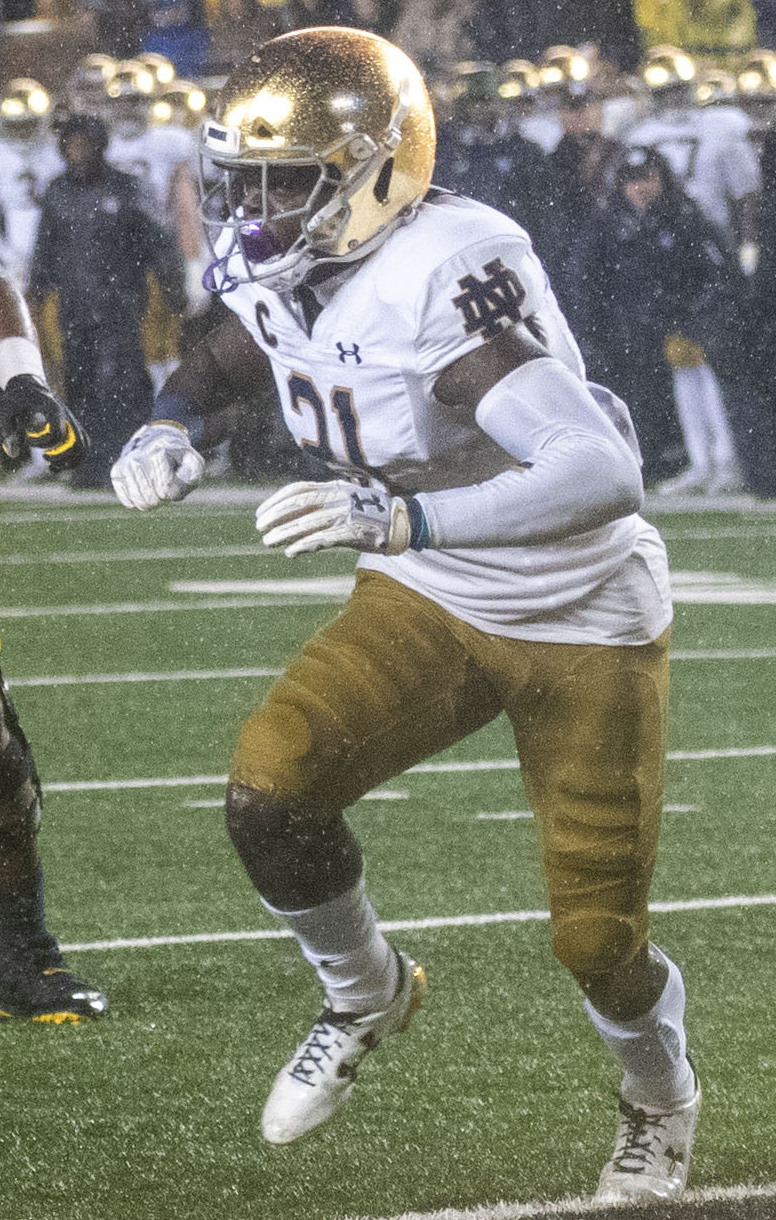
- Elliott with the Notre Dame Fighting Irish in 2019

Profile
- Position: Safety

Personal information
- Born: July 7, 1998 (age 28); Richmond, Virginia, U.S.
- Listed height: 6 ft 0 in (1.83 m)
- Listed weight: 205 lb (93 kg)

Career information
- High school: L. C. Bird (Chesterfield, Virginia)
- College: Notre Dame (2016–2019)
- NFL draft: 2020: undrafted

Career history
- Detroit Lions (2020–2021); New England Patriots (2022)*; Las Vegas Raiders (2022)*; Pittsburgh Steelers (2023–2024); San Antonio Brahmas (2025)
- * Offseason or practice squad member only

Career NFL statistics as of 2024
- Total tackles: 12
- Stats at Pro Football Reference

Jalen Anthony Elliott (born July 7, 1998) is an American professional football safety. He played college football for the Notre Dame Fighting Irish. He previously played for the Detroit Lions, New England Patriots and the Las Vegas Raiders.

== College career ==
Elliott played college football at Notre Dame from 2016 to 2019. He was named a captain for Notre Dame during his senior year in 2019.

== Professional career ==
Pre-draft measurables
Height	Weight	Arm length	Hand span	40-yard dash	10-yard split	20-yard split	20-yard shuttle	Three-cone drill	Vertical jump	Broad jump	Bench press
6 ft 0 3/8 in (1.84 m)	205 lb (93 kg)	31 3/4 in (0.81 m)	9 1/8 in (0.23 m)	4.80 s	1.62 s	2.79 s	4.30 s	6.87 s	34.0 in (0.86 m)	10 ft 5 in (3.18 m)	15 reps
All values from NFL Combine

=== Detroit Lions ===
On May 1, 2020, Elliott signed with the Detroit Lions as an undrafted free agent after the 2020 NFL draft. On September 5, 2020, he was released by the Lions.

On September 1, 2021, the Lions signed Elliott to the practice squad. On October 23, 2021, he was activated from the practice squad by the Lions for the team's week 7 game against the Los Angeles Rams. He was signed to the active roster on November 9.

On May 12, 2022, the Lions waived Elliott to make room for their rookie class.

=== New England Patriots ===
On August 2, 2022, Elliott signed with the New England Patriots. He was waived on August 20.

=== Las Vegas Raiders ===
On November 9, 2022, Elliott was signed to the practice squad of the Las Vegas Raiders. He signed a reserve/future contract on January 9, 2023. He was waived on May 1, 2023.

=== Pittsburgh Steelers ===
On August 8, 2023, Elliott signed with the Pittsburgh Steelers. He was waived on August 28, 2023.

Elliott signed a letter of intent with the Houston Roughnecks of the XFL on October 30, before re-signing to the Steelers' practice squad on October 31. He was released on November 28. Elliott was re-signed to the practice squad on December 19.

On January 17, 2024, Elliott signed a reserve/futures contract with the Steelers. He made the Steelers 53-man roster, playing in two games before being waived on October 1, 2024.

=== San Antonio Brahmas ===
On October 30, 2024, Elliott signed with the San Antonio Brahmas of the United Football League (UFL).
