= Chris Achuff =

American football coach (born 1975)

South Alabama Jaguars
- Title: Defensive line coach

Personal information
- Born: September 18, 1975 (age 51); Philadelphia, Pennsylvania, U.S.

Career information
- College: Bloomsburg

Career history
- Kutztown (2000–2001) Linebackers coach; Chattanooga (2004) Defensive line coach; Charleston Southern (2005) Defensive line coach; UT Martin (2006–2007) Defensive line coach; Baylor (2008–2016) Defensive line coach; Navarro (2017) Defensive coordinator & defensive line coach; Arizona Cardinals (2018) Assistant defensive line coach; Arizona Cardinals (2019) Defensive line coach; Syracuse (2020–2023) Defensive line coach; San Antonio Brahmas (2024–2025) Defensive line coach; South Alabama (2026–present) Defensive line coach

Chris Achuff (born September 18, 1975) is an American football coach who is the defensive line coach for the South Alabama Jaguars. He has served as a defensive line coach for the Arizona Cardinals of the National Football League (NFL).

== Coaching career ==
=== College ===
From 2008 to 2016, Achuff served as the defensive line coach at Baylor University.

On March 11, 2020, Achuff was named linebackers coach at Syracuse in a return to college football.

On January 20, 2026, Achuff was named as the defensive line coach at South Alabama.

=== National Football League ===
==== Arizona Cardinals ====
In 2018, Achuff was hired by the Arizona Cardinals to be their assistant defensive line coach. On January 31, 2019, Achuff was promoted to defensive line coach.

On December 30, 2019, it was announced that Achuff was being let go by the Cardinals after spending two seasons there.
