= Kohl Levao =

American football player (born 1998)

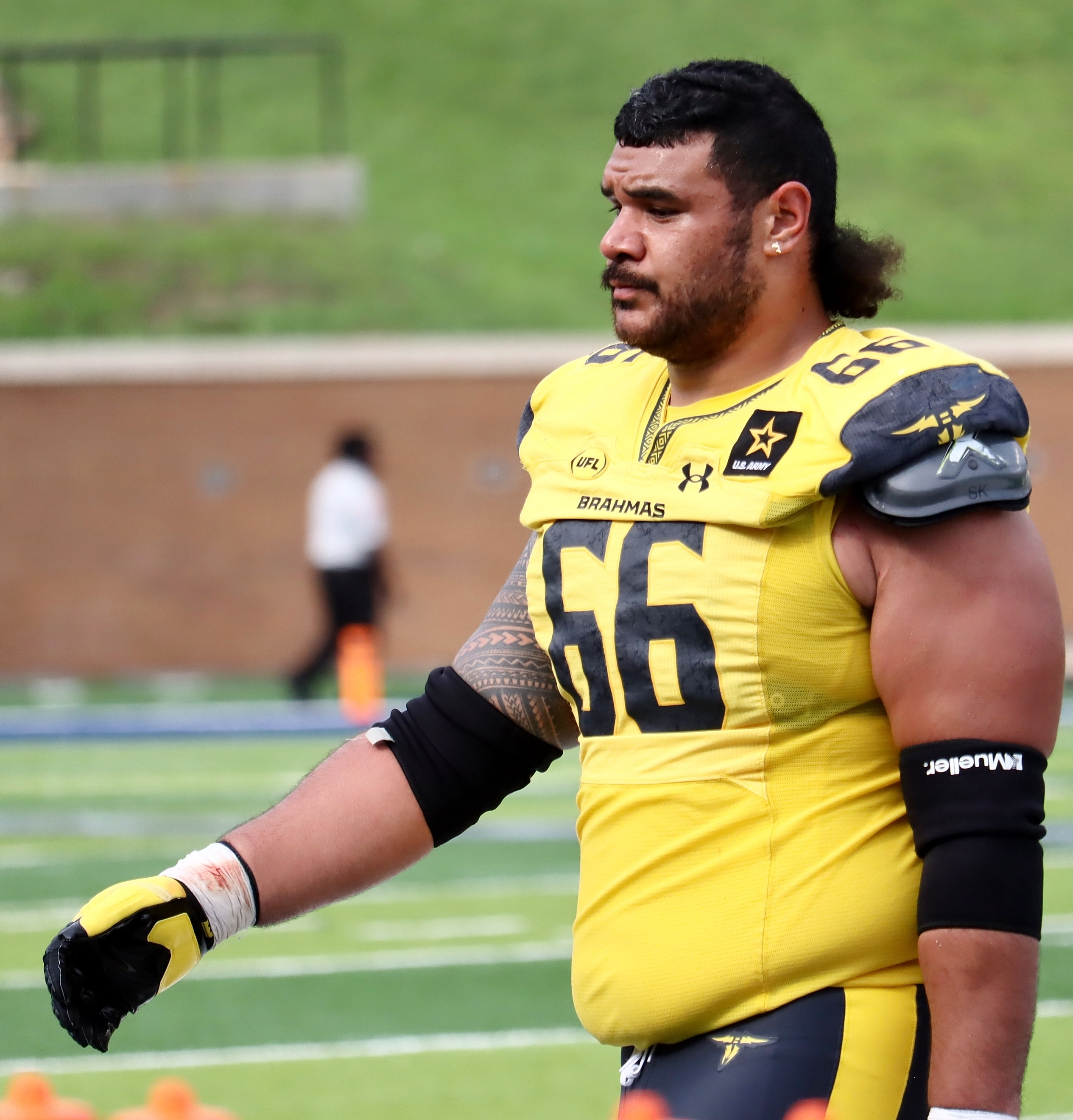

No. 60 – New York Jets
- Position: Guard
- Roster status: Practice squad

Personal information
- Born: February 21, 1998 (age 28); Pago Pago, American Samoa
- Listed height: 6 ft 6 in (1.98 m)
- Listed weight: 350 lb (159 kg)

Career information
- High school: Aberdeen (Aberdeen, Washington, U.S.)
- College: City College of San Francisco (2016–2017); Hawaii (2018–2021)
- NFL draft: 2022: undrafted

Career history
- Frisco Fighters (2022); San Antonio Brahmas (2023–2024); New York Jets (2024–present)

Awards and highlights
- All-UFL Team (2024)
- Stats at Pro Football Reference

Kohl Levao (born February 21, 1998) is an American Samoan professional football guard for the New York Jets of the National Football League (NFL). He played college football for the Hawaii Rainbow Warriors. Levao has also played for the Frisco Fighters of the Indoor Football League (IFL) and the San Antonio Brahmas of the United Football League (UFL).

== College career ==
Levao played college football at City College of San Francisco from 2016 to 2017, and for Hawaii from 2018 to 2021, where he played in 31 games, starting in 28.

== Professional career ==
Pre-draft measurables
Height	Weight	Arm length	Hand span	Wingspan	40-yard dash	10-yard split	20-yard split	20-yard shuttle	Three-cone drill	Vertical jump	Broad jump	Bench press
6 ft 4 7/8 in (1.95 m)	324 lb (147 kg)	33 1/4 in (0.84 m)	10 1/4 in (0.26 m)	6 ft 10 1/8 in (2.09 m)	5.47 s	1.94 s	3.11 s	4.90 s	8.00 s	26.0 in (0.66 m)	8 ft 2 in (2.49 m)	18 reps
All values from Pro Day

=== Frisco Fighters ===
After going undrafted in the 2022 NFL draft, Levao signed with the Frisco Fighters of the Indoor Football League (IFL).

=== San Antonio Brahmas ===
On November 17, 2022, Levao was selected by the San Antonio Brahmas of the XFL. In 2024, Levao started in all 12 games, making the All-UFL team. His contract with the team was terminated on June 17, 2024, to sign with an NFL team.

=== New York Jets ===
On June 19, 2024, Levao signed with the New York Jets. He was waived on August 27, and re-signed to the practice squad. Levao signed a reserve/future contract with New York on January 6, 2025.

On August 26, 2025, Levao was waived by the Jets as part of final roster cuts and re-signed to the practice squad the next day. He was promoted to the active roster on January 3, 2026.

On August 31, 2026, Levao was waived by the Jets. On September 1, New York re–signed Levao to their practice squad. On October 1, he was promoted to the active roster. He was waived on November 14 and re-signed to the practice squad three days later.
