= Kellen Mond =

American football player (born 1999)

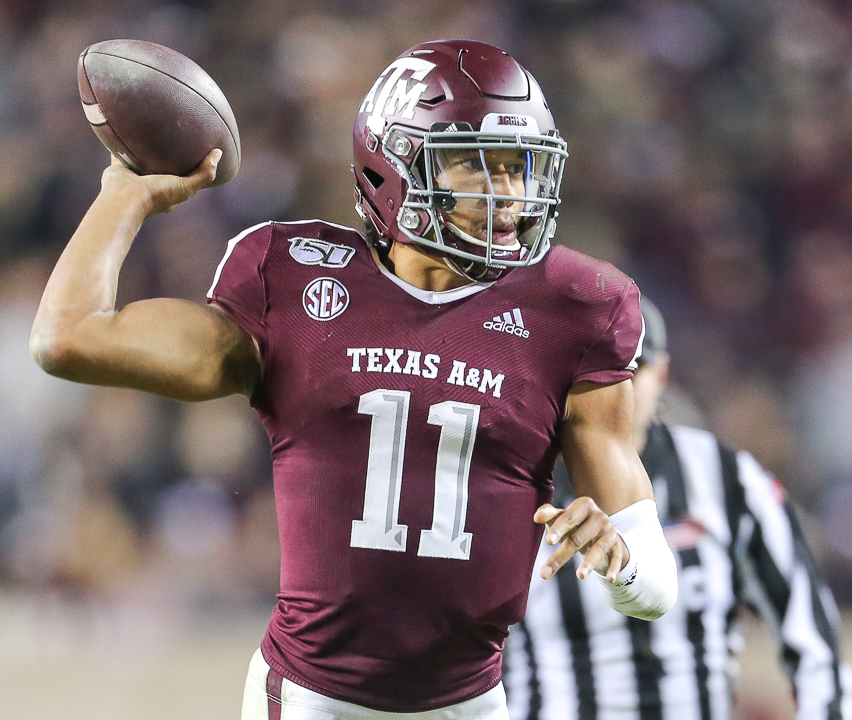
- Mond with the Texas A&M Aggies in 2019

Profile
- Position: Quarterback

Personal information
- Born: June 22, 1999 (age 27); San Antonio, Texas, U.S.
- Listed height: 6 ft 3 in (1.91 m)
- Listed weight: 211 lb (96 kg)

Career information
- High school: IMG Academy (Bradenton, Florida)
- College: Texas A&M (2017–2020)
- NFL draft: 2021: 3rd round, 66th overall pick

Career history
- Minnesota Vikings (2021); Cleveland Browns (2022); Indianapolis Colts (2023)*; New Orleans Saints (2024)*; San Antonio Brahmas (2025)
- * Offseason or practice squad member only

Career NFL statistics
- TD–INT: 0–0
- Passing yards: 5
- Passing attempts: 3
- Pass completions: 2
- Completion percentage: 66.6%
- Passer rating: 70.1
- Stats at Pro Football Reference

Kellen Louis Mond (born June 22, 1999) is an American former professional football quarterback. He played college football for the Texas A&M Aggies, where he was a four-year starter and became one of three SEC quarterbacks to record over 9,000 career passing yards with 1,500 rushing yards. Mond was selected by the Minnesota Vikings in the third round of the 2021 NFL draft.

== Early life ==
Mond originally attended Ronald Reagan High School in San Antonio, Texas, before transferring to IMG Academy in Bradenton, Florida, prior to his senior year. As a senior, he passed for 1,936 yards and 20 touchdowns and rushed for 775 yards and 18 touchdowns. Mond was rated by the Rivals.com recruiting network as a five-star recruit and was ranked as the number one dual-threat quarterback in his class. He committed to Texas A&M University to play college football under head coach Kevin Sumlin.

== College career ==
Mond entered his freshman year at Texas A&M in 2017 as a backup to Nick Starkel, but took over as the starter after Starkel was injured during the first game of the season against the UCLA Bruins. In his first career start, he completed 12-of-21 passes for 105 yards and a touchdown. Prior to Texas A&M's first game of the NCAA 2018–2019 season, Jimbo Fisher, who was in his first year as Texas A&M's head coach, replacing Kevin Sumlin, announced that Mond would be the starting quarterback for the season opener. Despite an initial feeling that Mond and Nick Starkel would continue to battle for the job after a long competition over the summer, Mond held on to the starting position for the remainder of the season, guiding the Aggies to an 8–4 record and a #19 ranking in the regular season College Football Playoff rankings. The Aggies' season culminated in a historic 74–72 seven-overtime win over Southeastern Conference (SEC) rival LSU. This game set several records, including the most points ever scored in a game in the FBS era, and tied a handful of other games for the longest college football game of all time with seven overtimes.

Entering the 2019 season, expectations were higher for Mond, though his overall performance failed to meet them. While his pass completion rate improved, his total yards and yards-per-attempt slightly decreased. In the 2020 season, however, he was able to improve with career-highs in pass completion percentage (63.5%) and yards-per-attempt (7.6). The Aggies finished the 2020 season 9–1 and ranked fourth in the final AP Poll. Mond performed at the 2021 Senior Bowl and was named its most valuable player.

He finished his career at Texas A&M as one of three SEC quarterbacks, along with Tim Tebow and Dak Prescott, to record over 9,000 career passing yards with 1,500 rushing yards.

== Professional career ==
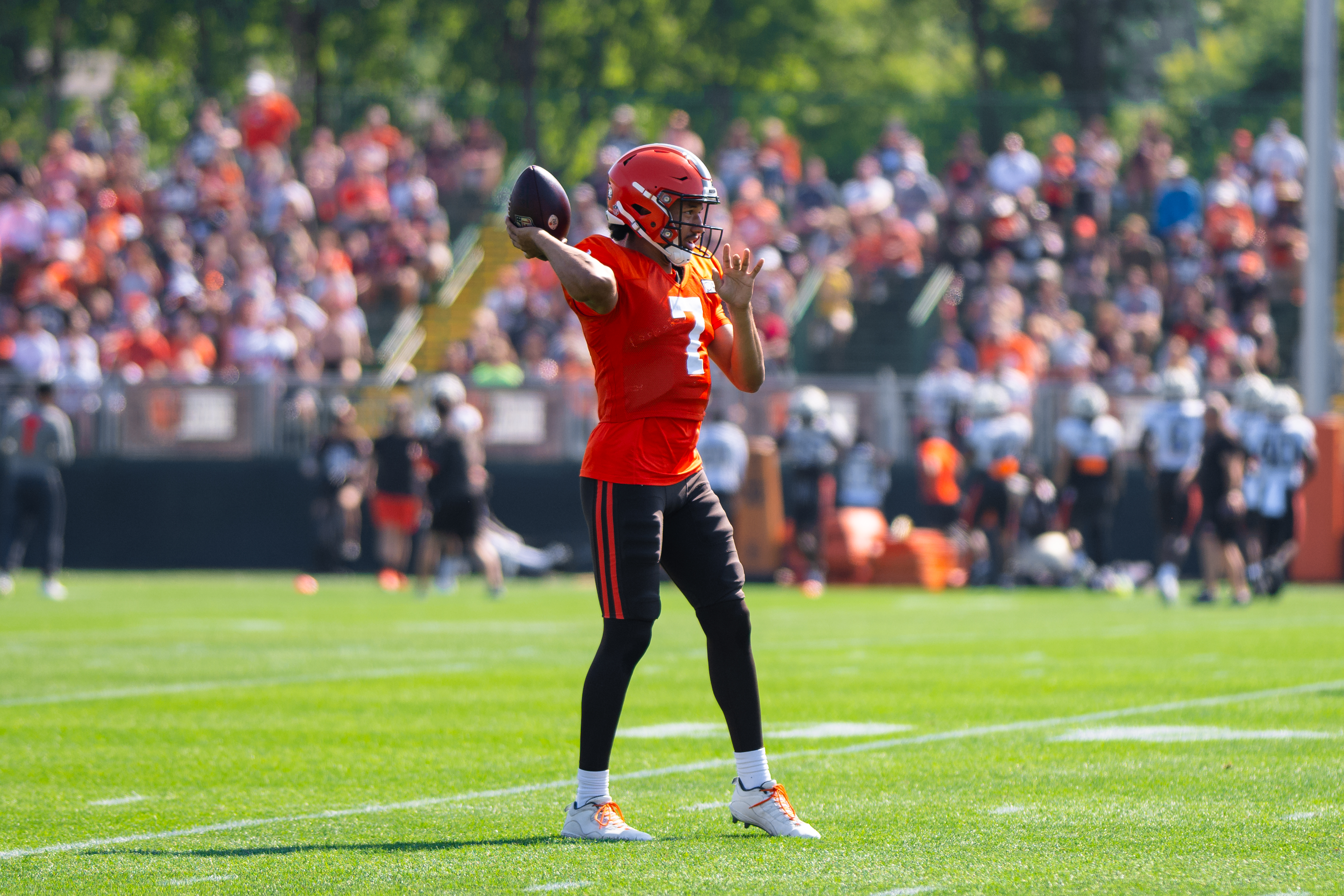
Mond with the Browns in 2023

Pre-draft measurables
Height	Weight	Arm length	Hand span	Wingspan	40-yard dash	10-yard split	20-yard split
6 ft 2 5/8 in (1.90 m)	211 lb (96 kg)	33 1/2 in (0.85 m)	9 3/8 in (0.24 m)	6 ft 8 1/8 in (2.04 m)	4.62 s	1.64 s	2.69 s
All values from Pro Day

=== Minnesota Vikings ===
Mond was selected by the Minnesota Vikings in the third round with the 66th overall pick in the 2021 NFL draft. He signed his four-year rookie contract with Minnesota on June 15, 2021.

Ahead of the Vikings' Week 17 matchup against the Green Bay Packers, Kirk Cousins was ruled out after testing positive for COVID-19. Head coach Mike Zimmer named Mond the backup to Sean Mannion. Mond's debut came in the fourth quarter after Mannion was being evaluated for an injury. He completed two of three passes for five yards in the 37–10 loss.

On August 30, 2022, Mond was waived by the Vikings.

=== Cleveland Browns ===
On August 31, 2022, Mond was claimed off waivers by the Cleveland Browns. He was released by the Browns on August 24, 2023. However, following the trade of Joshua Dobbs to the Arizona Cardinals, the Browns reclaimed Mond off waivers the following day. Mond was then released a second time as part of final roster cuts on August 29, and re-signed to the practice squad the next day. He was subsequently released a third time to make room for P. J. Walker on August 30.

=== Indianapolis Colts ===
On October 10, 2023, Mond was signed to the Indianapolis Colts' practice squad.

=== New Orleans Saints ===
On April 12, 2024, Mond signed with the New Orleans Saints. He was waived by the organization on May 8.

=== San Antonio Brahmas ===
On October 21, 2024, Mond signed with the San Antonio Brahmas of the United Football League (UFL).

== Career statistics ==
=== NFL ===
Year	Team	Games			Passing								Rushing			
Year	Team	GP	GS	Record	Cmp	Att	Pct	Yds	Y/A	TD	Int	Rtg	Att	Yds	Avg	TD
2021	MIN	1	0	0–0	2	3	66.7	5	1.7	0	0	70.1	0	0	0.0	0
Career		1	0	0–0	2	3	66.7	5	1.7	0	0	70.1	0	0	0.0	0

=== UFL ===
Year	Team	Games			Passing								Rushing			
Year	Team	GP	GS	Record	Cmp	Att	Pct	Yds	Y/A	TD	Int	Rtg	Att	Yds	Avg	TD
2025	SA	8	7	1–6	98	171	57.3	850	5.0	2	2	69.6	22	117	5.3	0
Career		8	7	1–6	98	171	57.3	850	5.0	2	2	69.6	22	117	5.3	0

=== College ===
Year	Team	Games			Passing								Rushing			
Year	Team	GP	GS	Record	Cmp	Att	Pct	Yds	Y/A	TD	Int	Rtg	Att	Yds	Avg	TD
2017	Texas A&M	11	8	5–3	117	227	51.5	1,375	6.1	8	6	108.8	89	340	3.8	3
2018	Texas A&M	13	13	9–4	238	415	57.3	3,107	7.5	24	9	135.0	149	474	3.2	7
2019	Texas A&M	13	13	8–5	258	419	61.6	2,897	6.9	20	9	131.1	126	500	4.0	8
2020	Texas A&M	10	10	9–1	188	297	63.3	2,282	7.7	19	3	146.9	74	294	4.0	4
Career		47	44	31–13	801	1,358	59	9,661	7.1	71	27	132.0	438	1,608	3.7	22
