= Anthony McFarland Jr. =

American football player (born 1998)

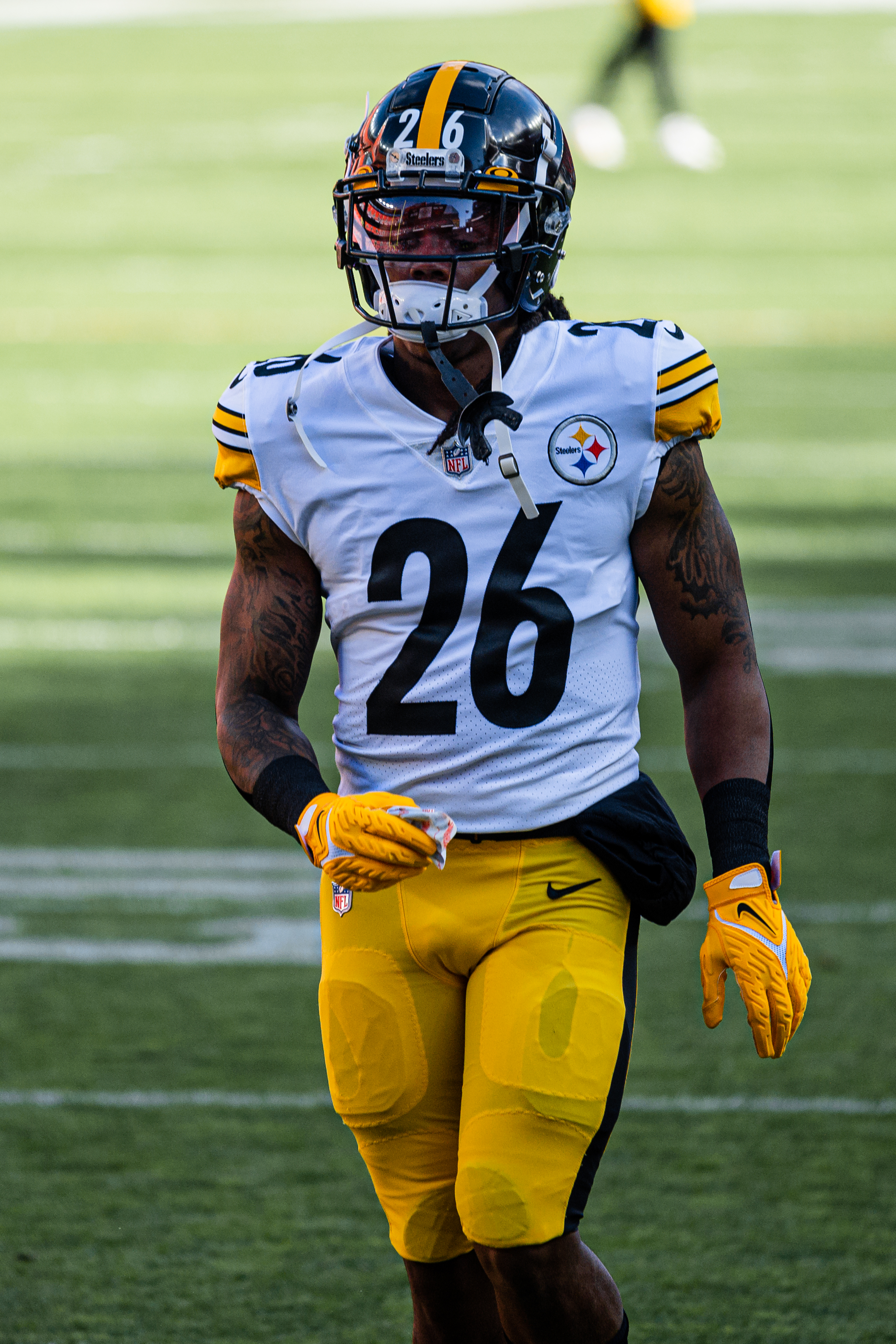
- McFarland with the Pittsburgh Steelers in 2021

Profile
- Position: Running back

Personal information
- Born: March 4, 1998 (age 28); Hyattsville, Maryland, U.S.
- Listed height: 5 ft 8 in (1.73 m)
- Listed weight: 197 lb (89 kg)

Career information
- High school: DeMatha Catholic (Hyattsville)
- College: Maryland (2017–2019)
- NFL draft: 2020: 4th round, 124th overall pick

Career history
- Pittsburgh Steelers (2020–2023); San Antonio Brahmas (2024); Miami Dolphins (2024)*; San Antonio Brahmas (2025); Birmingham Stallions (2026)
- * Offseason or practice squad member only

Career NFL statistics
- Rushing yards: 146
- Rushing average: 3.5
- Receptions: 11
- Receiving yards: 87
- Return yards: 237
- Stats at Pro Football Reference

Anthony McFarland Jr. (born March 4, 1998) is an American professional football running back. He played college football for the Maryland Terrapins, and was selected by the Pittsburgh Steelers in the fourth round of the 2020 NFL draft.

== Early life ==
McFarland attended Ernest Everett Just Middle School in Lake Arbor, Maryland, before attending DeMatha Catholic High School in Hyattsville, Maryland. He did not play football his senior season of high school due to injury. Despite this he was still an Under Armour All-American. He committed to the University of Maryland to play college football. At DeMatha, he was a teammate of defensive end Chase Young, who was later selected second overall in the 2020 NFL draft by the Washington Football Team.

== College career ==
McFarland Jr. redshirted his first year at Maryland in 2017. He played for the first time in two years in 2018. He started five of 12 games, rushing for 1,034 yards on 131 carries with four touchdowns. In 2019, he rushed for 614 yards on 114 carries and eight touchdowns. After the season, he entered the 2020 NFL draft, forgoing his final two seasons.

== Professional career ==
Pre-draft measurables
Height	Weight	Arm length	Hand span	Wingspan	40-yard dash	10-yard split	20-yard split	Vertical jump	Broad jump
5 ft 8 1/8 in (1.73 m)	208 lb (94 kg)	30 3/8 in (0.77 m)	8 7/8 in (0.23 m)	6 ft 1 3/8 in (1.86 m)	4.44 s	1.59 s	2.65 s	29.5 in (0.75 m)	9 ft 8 in (2.95 m)
All values from NFL Combine

=== Pittsburgh Steelers ===
McFarland was selected by the Pittsburgh Steelers in the fourth round of the 2020 NFL draft. He made his NFL debut in Week 3 of the 2020 season against the Houston Texans. He had six carries for 42 rushing yards in the 28–21 victory.

On September 1, 2021, McFarland was placed on injured reserve to start the season. He was activated on October 27.

On August 30, 2022, McFarland was waived by the Steelers and was signed to the practice squad the next day. He signed a reserve/future contract on January 12, 2023.

On September 18, 2023, McFarland was placed on injured reserve with a knee injury. He was activated on November 6. He was released on December 21 and re-signed to the practice squad. He was not signed to a reserve/future contract after the season and thus became a free agent when his practice squad contract expired.

=== San Antonio Brahmas (first stint) ===
On February 6, 2024, McFarland signed with the San Antonio Brahmas of the United Football League (UFL). He finished the 2024 season with 337 rushing yards, 249 receiving yards, and 5 total TD's in 7 games. His contract was terminated on August 19, 2024, to sign with an NFL team.

=== Miami Dolphins ===
McFarland signed with the Miami Dolphins on August 19, 2024. He was waived on August 27, and re-signed to the practice squad, but released a day later.

=== San Antonio Brahmas (second stint) ===
On March 6, 2025, McFarland re-signed with the Brahmas.

=== Birmingham Stallions ===
On January 13, 2026, McFarland was selected by the Birmingham Stallions in the 2026 UFL Draft.

== NFL career statistics ==
=== Regular season ===
Year	Team	Games		Rushing					Receiving					Kickoff returns				
Year	Team	GP	GS	Att	Yds	Avg	Lng	TD	Rec	Yds	Avg	Lng	TD	Att	Yds	Avg	Lng	TD
2020	PIT	11	0	33	113	3.4	20	0	6	54	9.0	17	0	—	—	—	—	—
2021	PIT	2	0	3	3	1.0	3	0	1	11	11.0	11	0	3	73	24.3	25	0
2022	PIT	1	0	6	30	5.0	14	0	2	11	5.5	12	0	—	—	—	—	—
2023	PIT	3	0	—	—	—	—	—	2	11	5.5	6	0	6	164	27.3	37	0
Career		17	0	42	146	3.5	20	0	11	87	7.9	17	0	9	237	26.3	37	0

== UFL career statistics ==
=== Regular season ===
Year	Team	Games		Rushing					Receiving					Kickoff returns				
Year	Team	GP	GS	Att	Yds	Avg	Lng	TD	Rec	Yds	Avg	Lng	TD	Att	Yds	Avg	Lng	TD
2024	SA	5	4	47	192	4.1	20	1	15	207	13.8	52T	3	4	90	22.5	28	0
2025	SA	5	2	36	236	6.6	31	0	8	39	4.9	15T	1	11	297	27.0	35	0
Career		10	6	83	428	5.2	31	1	23	246	10.7	52	4	15	387	25.8	35	0

=== Postseason ===
Year	Team	Games		Rushing					Receiving					Kickoff returns				
Year	Team	GP	GS	Att	Yds	Avg	Lng	TD	Rec	Yds	Avg	Lng	TD	Att	Yds	Avg	Lng	TD
2024	SA	2	1	20	147	7.4	69T	1	7	42	6.0	11	0	—	—	—	—	—
Career		2	1	20	147	7.4	69	1	7	42	6.0	11	0	0	0	0.0	0	0
