= Matthew Gotel =

American football player (born 1999)

Profile
- Position: Nose tackle

Personal information
- Born: January 2, 1999 (age 27); Tacoma, Washington, U.S.
- Listed height: 6 ft 2 in (1.88 m)
- Listed weight: 341 lb (155 kg)

Career information
- High school: Lakes (Lakewood, Washington)
- College: Snow (2017–2018); West Florida (2019–2021)
- NFL draft: 2022: undrafted

Career history
- Seattle Seahawks (2022)*; Atlanta Falcons (2022)*; San Antonio Brahmas (2023); Atlanta Falcons (2023)*; Seattle Seahawks (2023–2024); San Antonio Brahmas (2025)
- * Offseason or practice squad member only
- Stats at Pro Football Reference

Matthew Gotel (born January 2, 1999) is an American football nose tackle. He played college football for the Snow Badgers and West Florida Argonauts and has also been a member of the Seattle Seahawks and the Atlanta Falcons.

== Early life and college career ==
Gotel was born on January 2, 1999, in Tacoma, Washington. He attended Lakes High School in Lakewood, Washington, and was a member of their highly-successful football team under coach Dave Miller. His only offer to play college football came from the junior college ranks in Snow College in Ephraim, Utah. He totaled 19 tackles as a freshman in 2017 and 26 as a sophomore in 2018.

Gotel was noticed by a football recruiter at the University of West Florida while playing in a bowl game for Snow College. He liked the school and enrolled there in 2019. He helped them win an NCAA Division II national championship that season while totaling 31 tackles. The 2020 season was canceled due to the COVID-19 pandemic. As a senior in 2021, he posted 26 tackles, 1.5 tackles-for-loss and 1.5 sacks.

== Professional career ==
Pre-draft measurables
Height	Weight	Arm length	Hand span	40-yard dash	10-yard split	20-yard split	20-yard shuttle	Three-cone drill	Vertical jump	Broad jump	Bench press
6 ft 1 3/4 in (1.87 m)	341 lb (155 kg)	32 3/8 in (0.82 m)	9 3/4 in (0.25 m)	5.34 s	1.87 s	3.02 s	4.75 s	7.83 s	27.0 in (0.69 m)	8 ft 6 in (2.59 m)	32 reps
All values from Pro Day

=== Seattle Seahawks ===
Gotel paid his way to being one of 58 players at the rookie minicamp of the Seattle Seahawks, for players not selected in the 2022 NFL draft. He impressed the team and was offered a contract as an undrafted free agent. He was waived on August 20, 2022.

=== Atlanta Falcons ===
Gotel had a brief stint with the Atlanta Falcons and was released.

=== San Antonio Brahmas ===
Gotel joined the San Antonio Brahmas of the XFL after having been selected in the 2023 XFL draft. He made the Brahmas final roster and appeared in all 10 games for the team, making 23 tackles.

=== Atlanta Falcons (second stint) ===
Gotel signed with the Falcons on August 4, 2023. He was released three days later.

=== Seattle Seahawks (second stint) ===
Gotel signed with the Seattle Seahawks on August 17. He was released at the final roster cuts and subsequently re-signed to the practice squad. He was released from the practice squad on November 10, then re-signed on January 1, 2024. He was elevated to the active roster for the team's season finale in Week 18 against the Arizona Cardinals. He signed a reserve/future contract on January 8, 2024.

Gotel was waived on August 8, 2024, and later re-signed to the practice squad.

=== San Antonio Brahmas (second stint) ===
On April 10, 2025, Gotel signed with the San Antonio Brahmas of the United Football League (UFL).
