= Jashaun Corbin =

American football player (born 2000)

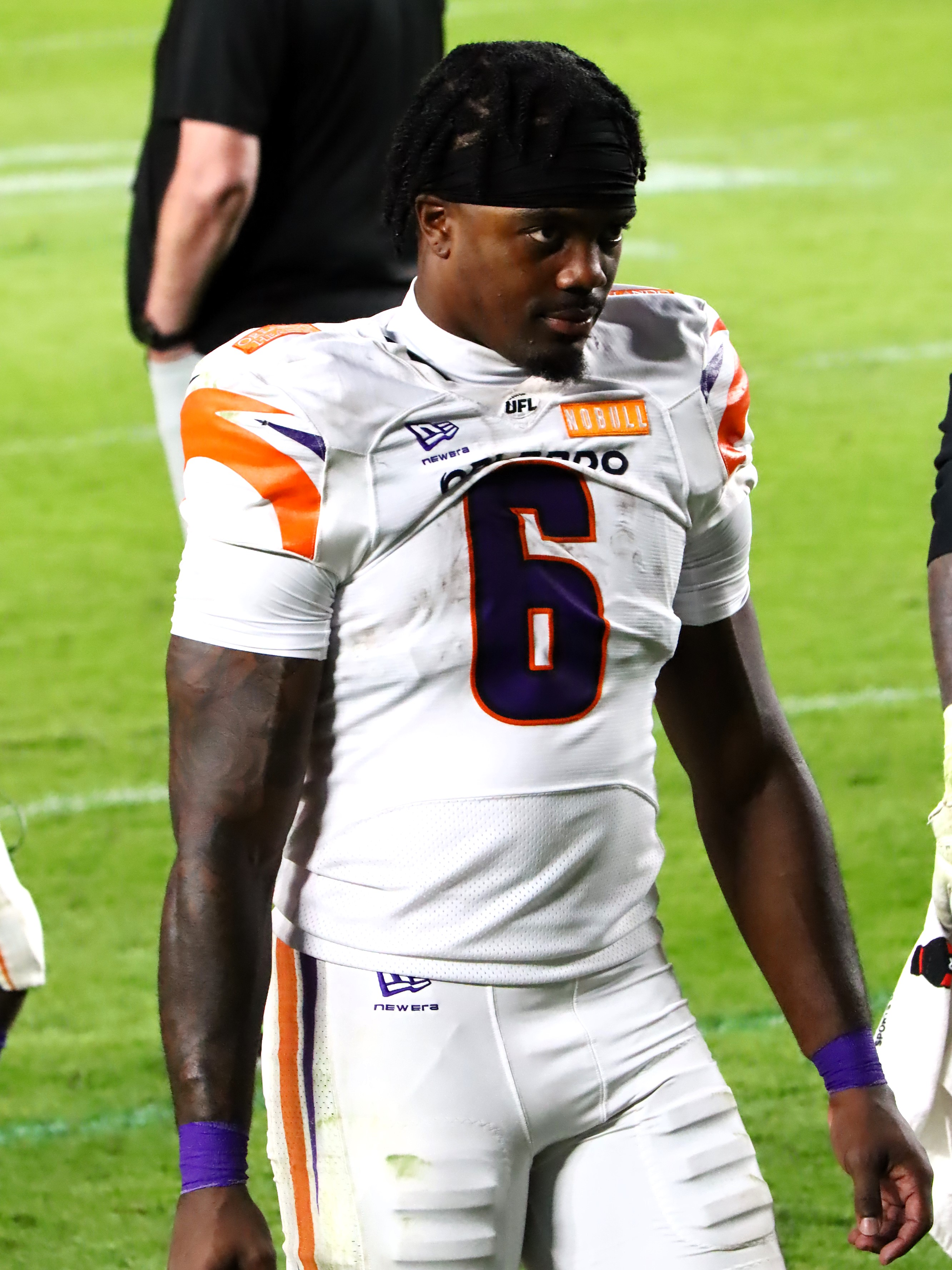
- Corbin with the Orlando Storm in 2026

No. 36 – Dallas Cowboys
- Position: Running back
- Roster status: Practice squad

Personal information
- Born: August 20, 2000 (age 26); Rockledge, Florida, U.S.
- Listed height: 5 ft 11 in (1.80 m)
- Listed weight: 203 lb (92 kg)

Career information
- High school: Rockledge (FL)
- College: Texas A&M (2018–2019); Florida State (2020–2021)
- NFL draft: 2022: undrafted

Career history
- New York Giants (2022); Carolina Panthers (2023)*; New York Giants (2023); San Antonio Brahmas (2025); Atlanta Falcons (2025)*; New England Patriots (2025)*; Orlando Storm (2026); Dallas Cowboys (2026–present)
- * Offseason or practice squad member only

Awards and highlights
- UFL rushing yards leader (2025); All-UFL Team (2025); Third-team All-ACC (2021)

Career NFL statistics as of 2023
- Rushing yards: 1
- Rushing average: 1.0
- Receptions: 3
- Receiving yards: 12
- Stats at Pro Football Reference

Jashaun Corbin (born August 20, 2000) is an American professional football running back for the Dallas Cowboys of the National Football League (NFL). He played college football for the Texas A&M Aggies and Florida State Seminoles.

== Early life ==
Corbin's hometown is Rockledge, Florida, and he attended Holy Trinity Episcopal Academy for three years. while finishing his high school career at Rockledge High School. In Corbin's high school career, he rushed for 2,982 yards and 34 touchdowns, while also hauling in 85 receptions for 1,418 yards and 15 touchdowns. Corbin committed to play college football at Texas A&M.

== College career ==
=== Texas A&M ===
In week five of the 2018 season, Corbin returned a kickoff 100 yards for a touchdown, as he helped Texas A&M beat the Arkansas Razorbacks. Corbin finished the 2018 season with 346 rushing yards and a touchdown, while also hauling in ten receptions for 85 yards. Corbin also returned 14 kickoffs for 422 yards and a touchdown. In week one of the 2019 season, Corbin had a career performance rushing for 103 yards and a touchdown in a win over Texas State Bobcats 41–7. Corbin finished the 2019 season with 137 rushing yards and a touchdown, while also bringing in six receptions for 16 yards. After the conclusion of the 2019 season, he would decide to enter the NCAA transfer portal.

=== Florida State ===
Corbin would decide to transfer to Florida State to continue out his college career. In Florida State's 2020 season finale, Corbin displayed a solid performance, rushing for 72 yards and three touchdowns as he helped the Seminoles beat the Duke Blue Devils. In week one of the 2021 season, Corbin had a shining performance, rushing for 144 yards and a touchdown. However, Florida State would fall to the Notre Dame Fighting Irish with a final score of 41–38. Corbin would finish the 2021 season as his best, rushing for 887 yards and seven touchdowns while notching 25 receptions for 144 yards and a touchdown. For his performance on the season, Corbin was named third team All-ACC. After the conclusion of the 2021 season, Corbin would decide to declare for the 2022 NFL draft.

Corbin would finish his college career with 1,771 rushing yards and 14 touchdowns in addition to 60 receptions for 360 yards and two touchdowns.

=== Statistics ===
Year	Team	Games		Rushing				Receiving				Kick returns			
Year	Team	GP	GS	Att	Yds	Avg	TD	Rec	Yds	Avg	TD	Att	Yds	Avg	TD
2018	Texas A&M	12	1	61	346	5.7	1	10	85	8.5	0	14	422	30.1	1
2019	Texas A&M	2	2	35	137	3.9	1	6	16	2.7	1	1	19	19.0	0
2020	Florida State	9	8	81	401	5.0	5	19	115	6.1	0	2	32	16.0	0
2021	Florida State	12	12	143	887	6.2	7	25	144	5.8	1	7	128	18.3	0
Career		35	23	320	1,771	5.5	14	60	360	6.0	2	24	601	25.0	1

== Professional career ==
Pre-draft measurables
Height	Weight	Arm length	Hand span	Wingspan	40-yard dash	10-yard split	20-yard split	20-yard shuttle	Three-cone drill	Vertical jump	Broad jump	Bench press
5 ft 11 1/8 in (1.81 m)	202 lb (92 kg)	31 1/2 in (0.80 m)	9 1/2 in (0.24 m)	6 ft 4 in (1.93 m)	4.60 s	1.58 s	2.68 s	4.25 s	7.06 s	34.0 in (0.86 m)	9 ft 10 in (3.00 m)	11 reps
All values from NFL Combine/Pro Day

=== New York Giants (first stint) ===
After not being selected in the 2022 NFL draft, Corbin signed with the New York Giants as an undrafted free agent. However Corbin was released during final roster cuts and signed to the practice squad the next day. Corbin was elevated from the practice squad ahead of the Giants wild card round, and he reverted to the practice squad after the game. On January 22, 2023, Corbin signed a reserve/future contract with the Giants.

On August 29, 2023, Corbin was waived by the Giants as part of final roster cuts.

=== Carolina Panthers ===
On September 1, 2023, Corbin was signed to the Carolina Panthers practice squad.

=== New York Giants (second stint) ===
On October 24, 2023, the Giants signed Corbin off the Panthers practice squad to their active roster. He was waived/injured on August 9, 2024.

=== San Antonio Brahmas ===
On October 31, 2024, Corbin signed with the San Antonio Brahmas of the United Football League (UFL). Corbin would finish the season as the leagues leading rusher with 514 yards and was selected for the All-UFL Team.

=== Atlanta Falcons ===
On June 17, 2025, Corbin signed with the Atlanta Falcons. He was waived on August 26 as part of final roster cuts.

=== New England Patriots ===
On October 7, 2025, Corbin was signed to the New England Patriots' practice squad. He was released on December 30.

=== Orlando Storm ===
On January 13, 2026, Corbin was selected by the Orlando Storm in the 2026 UFL Draft.

=== Dallas Cowboys ===
On August 7, 2026, Corbin signed with the Dallas Cowboys. On August 30, he was waived by the Cowboys as a part of final roster cuts. On November 4, Corbin re-signed with the practice squad.

== NFL career statistics ==
Year	Team	Games		Rushing					Receiving				
Year	Team	GP	GS	Att	Yds	Avg	Lng	TD	Rec	Yds	Avg	Lng	TD
2023	NYG	6	0	1	1	1.0	1	0	3	12	4.0	7	0
Career		6	0	1	1	1.0	1	0	3	12	4.0	7	0

== UFL career statistics ==
Year	Team	Games		Rushing					Receiving				
Year	Team	GP	GS	Att	Yds	Avg	Lng	TD	Rec	Yds	Avg	Lng	TD
2025	SA	10	6	97	514	5.3	57	4	18	138	7.5	32	0
2026	ORL	10	9	131	437	3.3	19	3	21	118	5.6	20	1
Career		20	15	228	951	4.2	57	7	39	256	6.6	32	1
