= Jack Welch (American football) =

American football coach

Coaching career (HC unless noted)
- 1980: West Texas State (GA)
- 1981: Santo HS (TX)
- 1982–1984: West Texas State (OC/ST)
- 1985–1986: Kansas Wesleyan
- 1987–1992: Fort Scott CC
- 1993: Louisiana Tech (ST/TE)
- 1994–2017: Copperas Cove HS (TX)
- 2019–2024: Texas A&M–Commerce / East Texas A&M (ST/COS)
- 2025: San Antonio Brahmas (ST/TE)

Head coaching record
- Overall: 8–12 (college); 34–27 (junior college); 194–91–1 (high school)
- Bowls: 0–3 (junior college)
- Tournaments: 1–3 (KJCCC playoffs)

Jack Welch is president of Fort Scott Community College in Fort Scott, Kansas, but is better known for his career as an American football coach. Welch served as the head football coach at Kansas Wesleyan University from 1985 to 1986, Fort Scott Community College from 1987 to 1992, and Copperas Cove High School in Copperas Cove, Texas from 1994 to 2017. His most recent coaching position was as special teams coordinator and tight ends coach for the San Antonio Brahmas of the United Football League during the UFL's spring 2025 season.

== Coaching career ==
=== Kansas Wesleyan ===
Welch was the 17th head football coach at Kansas Wesleyan University in Salina, Kansas serving for two seasons, from 1985 to 1986, and compiling a record of 8–12.

The results Welch produced at Kansas Wesleyan were considered a "turnaround" because the year before his arrival, the team had winless season. At the time, the program had the nations's longest losing streak in NAIA football.

=== Other coaching positions ===
Welch's coaching career also includes stops at East Texas A&M University, Louisiana Tech University, West Texas A&M University, and Fort Scott Community College.

Welch is known nationally for his recruiting and special teams, and his collegiate offensive units were highly ranked every season. He was hired in 2019 as the Special Teams Coordinator and Running Back Coach at East Texas A&M University. He has most wins ever as head coach at Copperas Cove and Ft. Scott Community College.

Welch retired in 2018 from his positions as the athletic director and head football coach for Copperas Cove High School in Copperas Cove, Texas. He had record of 194–91–1 at Copperas Cove. Welch's accomplishments also include 18 berths in the state playoffs and two appearances in the Texas 4A State Championship. Welch led the Bulldawgs to eight district, ten bi-district, five area, four regional, three quarterfinal, and two state semifinal championships. Welch has the most wins of any head coach in Copperas Cove history with victories over many of Texas' most notorious 5A and 6A power houses including Odessa Permian, Converse Judson and Southlake Carroll. Welch was Class 6A "Coach of the Year" in 1998 and has been the District "Coach of the Year" eight times. He coached over 300 players at Copperas Cove who signed college scholarships and 16 players who made it to the professional ranks, 13 National Football League (NFL), including Heisman Trophy winner Robert Griffin III and Charles Tillman, 1 to the CFL and 2 to the UFL. He is one of the top 100 coaches in wins in Texas history of high school football.

Welch had initially anticipated joining the San Antonio Caballeros of the International Football Alliance for the 2025 season on the staff of Hal Mumme; on April 16, he instead joined another San Antonio professional team, the San Antonio Brahmas of the UFL, as their special teams coach, replacing Payton Pardee as Pardee was promoted to head coach after incumbent Wade Phillips was forced to step down due to health issues.

== Education ==
Welch earned a bachelor's degree from Taylor University in Indiana, a master's degree from West Texas A&M University, and a doctorate from the University of Mary Hardin–Baylor. In June 2025, Welch was named president of Fort Scott Community College in Kansas, where he had previously served as head football coach from 1987 to 1992.

== Head coaching record ==
=== College ===
Year	Team	Overall	Conference	Standing	Bowl/playoffs
Kansas Wesleyan Coyotes (Kansas Collegiate Athletic ConferenceMusician) (1985–1986)
1985	Kansas Wesleyan	2–8	2–7	T–8th	
1986	Kansas Wesleyan	6–4	6–3	T–4th	
Kansas Wesleyan:		8–12	8–10		
Total:		8–12			

=== Junior college ===
Year	Team	Overall	Conference	Standing	Bowl/playoffs
Fort Scott Greyhounds (Kansas Jayhawk Community College Conference) (1987–1992)
1987	Fort Scott	3–6	0–6	6th	
1988	Fort Scott	5–4	2–4	T–5th	
1989	Fort Scott	5–4	2–4	T–4th	
1990	Fort Scott	6–5	3–3	T–3rd	L KJCCC semifinal, L RC Cola Bowl
1991	Fort Scott	7–4	4–2	T–3rd	L KJCCC semifinal, L Midwest Bowl
1992	Fort Scott	8–4	4–2	T–2nd	L KJCCC semifinal, L Valley of the Sun Bowl
Fort Scott:		34–27	15–21		
Total:		34–27			

=== High school ===
Year	Team	Overall	Conference	Standing	Bowl/playoffs
Santo Wildcats () (1981)
1981	Santo	2–7			
Santo:		2–7			
Copperas Cove Bulldawgs () (1994–2017)
1994	Copperas Cove	5–3–1			
1995	Copperas Cove	2–8			
1996	Copperas Cove	7–3			
1997	Copperas Cove	5–5			
1998	Copperas Cove	10–3		3rd	
1999	Copperas Cove	9–2		2nd	
2000	Copperas Cove	11–1		1st	
2001	Copperas Cove	11–1		1st	
2002	Copperas Cove	7–4		3rd	
2003	Copperas Cove	6–4			
2004	Copperas Cove	11–2	7–0	1st	
2005	Copperas Cove	13–1	7–0	1st	
2006	Copperas Cove	12–3	4–1	2nd	
2007	Copperas Cove	11–3	2–2	2nd	
2008	Copperas Cove	13–2		2nd	
2009	Copperas Cove	8–3		3rd	
2010	Copperas Cove	9–2		2nd	
2011	Copperas Cove	10–2		1st	
2012	Copperas Cove	7–4		2nd	
2013	Copperas Cove	6–5		4th	
2014	Copperas Cove	7–4		2nd	
2015	Copperas Cove	3–8	3–3	3rd	
2016	Copperas Cove	4–5	2–4	5th	
2017	Copperas Cove	5–6	3–3	3rd	
Copperas Cove:		192–84–1			
Total:		194–91–1			
National championship Conference title Conference division title or championship game berth
