= A. J. Smith (American football coach) =

American football coach

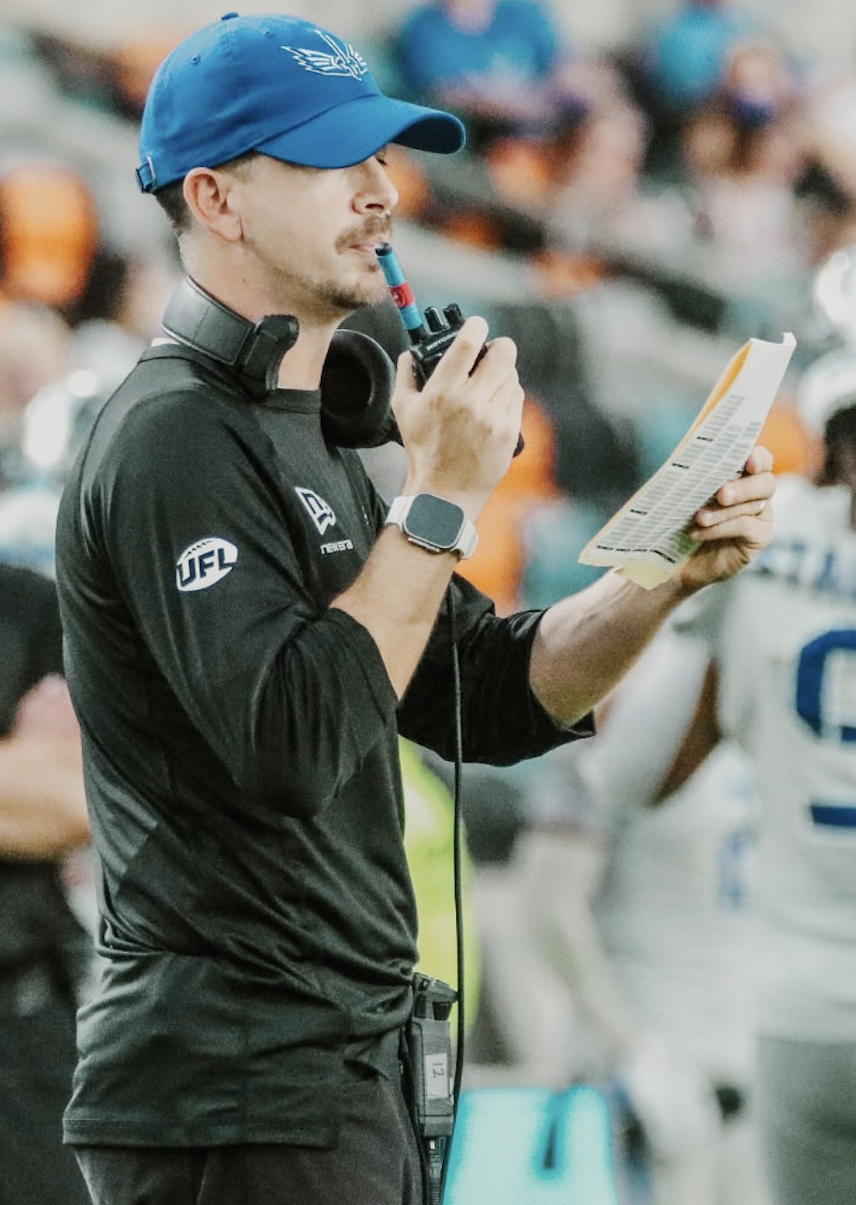
- Smith in 2026 with the St. Louis Battlehawks

St. Louis Battlehawks
- Title: Offensive coordinator

Personal information
- Born: March 6, 1989 (age 37); Shreveport, Louisiana, U.S.

Career history
- New Orleans (2008) Student assistant; Airline HS (LA) (2009) Quarterbacks coach; West St. Mary HS (LA) (2010–2011) Offensive coordinator; Northwestern State (2012) Graduate assistant; Louisiana–Lafayette (2013) Quality control; SMU (2014) Graduate assistant; UCLA (2015) Analyst; Southeastern (2016) Quarterbacks coach; Hamilton Tiger-Cats (2017) Quarterbacks coach (Guest); Jackson State (2018) Quarterbacks coach; Houston Roughnecks (2020) Wide receivers coach; TSL Conquerors (2021) Offensive coordinator; Houston Roughnecks (2023) Offensive coordinator; San Antonio Brahmas (2024–2025) Offensive coordinator; St. Louis Battlehawks (2026–present) Offensive coordinator; Colorado (2026–present) Quarterbacks coach

Austin James Smith (born March 6, 1989) is an American football coach who is currently the offensive coordinator for the St. Louis Battlehawks of the United Football League (UFL).

== Early life ==
Smith grew up in Shreveport, Louisiana. He played for Doug Pederson at Calvary Baptist Academy.

== Coaching career ==
Smith started coaching football in 2008 at the age of 19. As a coordinator, Smith's offenses have set numerous national and league records and featured All-American quarterbacks and receivers.

=== TSL Conquerors ===
On Fox Sports 1 in 2021, Smith was the offensive coordinator for The Spring League Conquerors led by head coach Jerry Glanville. The Conquerors had a 4–2 record, were second in scoring offense and first in total passing yards. They gave the eventual league champions their only loss of the season, putting up 39 points against them.

=== Houston Roughnecks ===
Smith was an assistant coach in 2020 for the Houston Roughnecks under head coach June Jones. Houston would go 5–0 until the league shutdown operations. Smith would return to the Roughnecks in 2023 this time as the offensive coordinator under new head coach Wade Phillips. Smith became known for his play calls such as “GTFO” and the ability to check to each player using the headset technology.

Smith's offense executed the first and only double forward pass of the 2023 season for a touchdown that was named after the late Mike Leach.

=== San Antonio Brahmas ===
Smith was re-hired by Wade Phillips in the newly merged league of the XFL and USFL, the UFL. Smith was the offensive coordinator of the San Antonio Brahmas.

On April 9, 2025, Smith stepped down as offensive coordinator for the Brahmas. In a later interview, Smith explained that he had lost an internal power struggle that had developed due to Phillips's extended absences and declining health, and that the team's front office had vetoed Smith's attempts to sign A. J. McCarron as quarterback and had pressured Smith to abandon the offensive strategies that had made the Brahmas successful.

=== St. Louis Battlehawks and Colorado Buffaloes ===
On January 16, 2026, Smith concurrently accepted the offensive coordinator position with the UFL's St. Louis Battlehawks and the quarterbacks coach with the Colorado Buffaloes football team. Because of the separate seasons for each team, Smith will be able to hold both jobs simultaneously, a situation similar to that of DC Defenders head coach Shannon Harris. His signing with the Battlehawks reunites Smith with Brandon Silvers, whom Smith had also coached with the Roughnecks.
