= Tavante Beckett =

American football player (born 1997)

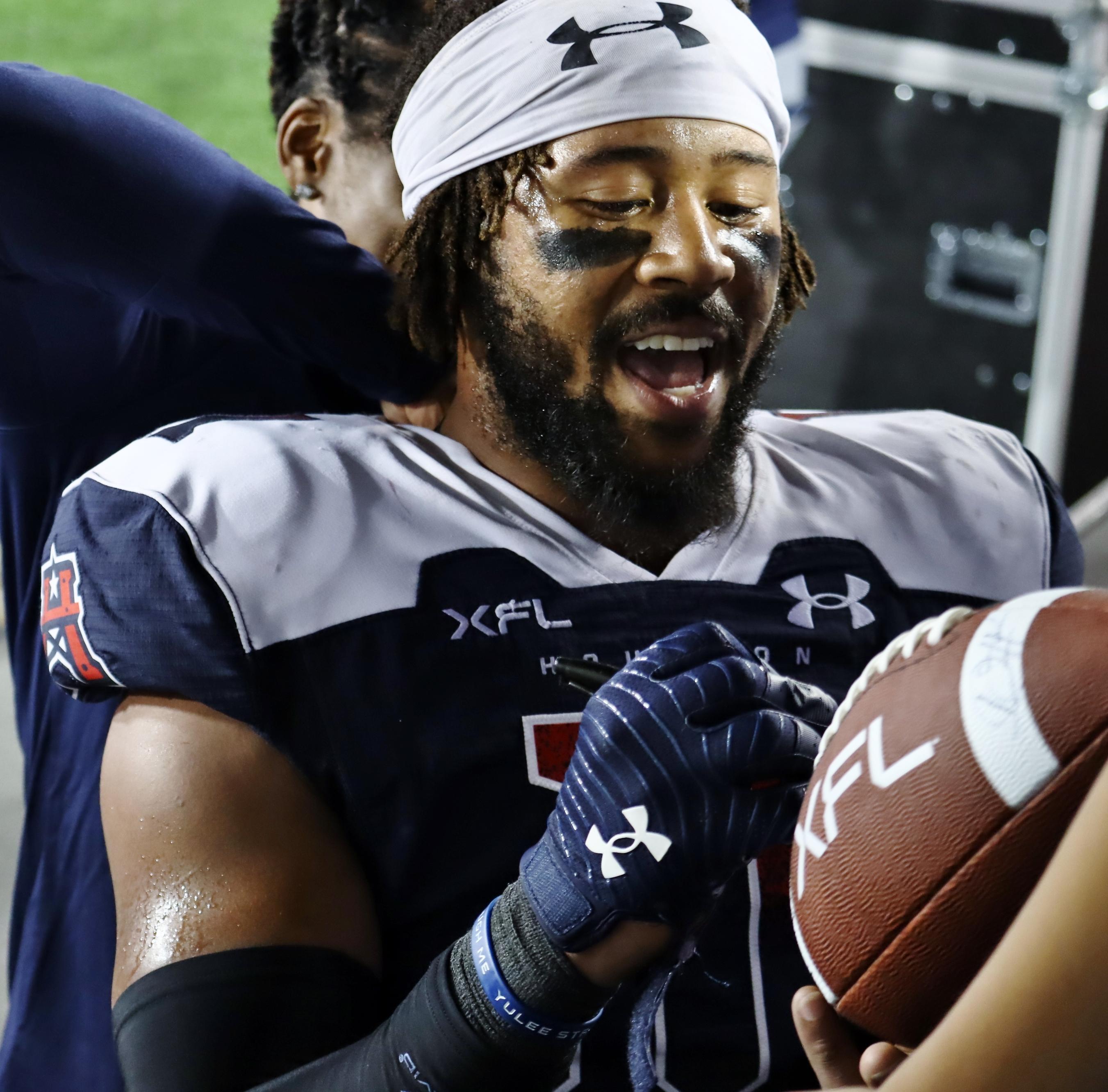
- Beckett with the Houston Roughnecks in 2023

Profile
- Position: Linebacker

Personal information
- Born: October 21, 1997 (age 29); Chesapeake, Virginia, U.S.
- Listed height: 5 ft 10 in (1.78 m)
- Listed weight: 208 lb (94 kg)

Career information
- High school: Indian River (Chesapeake, Virginia)
- College: Virginia Tech (2016–2017); Marshall (2018–2020)
- NFL draft: 2021: undrafted

Career history
- Detroit Lions (2021); Houston Roughnecks (2023); San Antonio Brahmas (2024–2025); Orlando Storm (2026)

Awards and highlights
- 2× All-UFL Team (2024, 2025); UFL tackles leader (2025); FWAA Second-team All-American (2020)

Career NFL statistics
- Games played: 4
- Stats at Pro Football Reference

Tavante Beckett (born October 21, 1997) is an American professional football linebacker. He played college football at Virginia Tech and Marshall.

== College career ==
Beckett began his collegiate career at Virginia Tech. He was suspended indefinitely after his freshman season following an arrest for marijuana possession and ultimately transferred to Marshall University. Beckett was named the Conference USA Defensive Player of the Year in his redshirt senior season.

== Professional career ==
Pre-draft measurables
| Height | Weight | Arm length | Hand span | Wingspan | 40-yard dash | 10-yard split | 20-yard split | 20-yard shuttle | Three-cone drill | Vertical jump | Broad jump | Bench press |
|---|---|---|---|---|---|---|---|---|---|---|---|---|
| 5 ft 10 in (1.78 m) | 220 lb (100 kg) | 32 3/4 in (0.83 m) | 10 3/8 in (0.26 m) | 6 ft 3 1/8 in (1.91 m) | 4.78 s | 1.70 s | 2.70 s | 4.58 s | 7.34 s | 31.0 in (0.79 m) | 8 ft 10 in (2.69 m) | 18 reps |
All values from Pro Day

=== Detroit Lions ===
Beckett signed with the Detroit Lions as an undrafted free agent on May 3, 2021. He was waived on August 31, during final roster cuts and was re-signed to the practice squad the next day. Beckett was elevated to the active roster on December 5, for the team's Week 13 game against the Minnesota Vikings and made his NFL debut in the game. He signed a reserve/future contract with the Lions on January 10, 2022. He was waived on May 10, 2022.

=== Houston Roughnecks ===
On November 17, 2022, Beckett was selected by the Houston Roughnecks of the XFL. The Roughnecks brand was transferred to the Houston Gamblers when the XFL and USFL merged to create the United Football League (UFL).

=== San Antonio Brahmas ===
On January 5, 2024, Beckett was selected by the San Antonio Brahmas during the 2024 UFL dispersal draft. He was named to the 2024 All-UFL team on June 5, 2024. He re-signed with the team on August 27, 2024. On June 2, 2025, Beckett was named to 2025 All-UFL Team.

=== Orlando Storm ===
On January 13, 2026, Beckett was selected by the Orlando Storm in the 2026 UFL Draft.

== Coaching Career ==
During the 2026 UFL Offseason, Beckett joined the Missouri Baptist Spartans as an assistant linebackers graduate assistant.
