= Jordan Williams (linebacker, born 1997) =

American football player (born 1997)

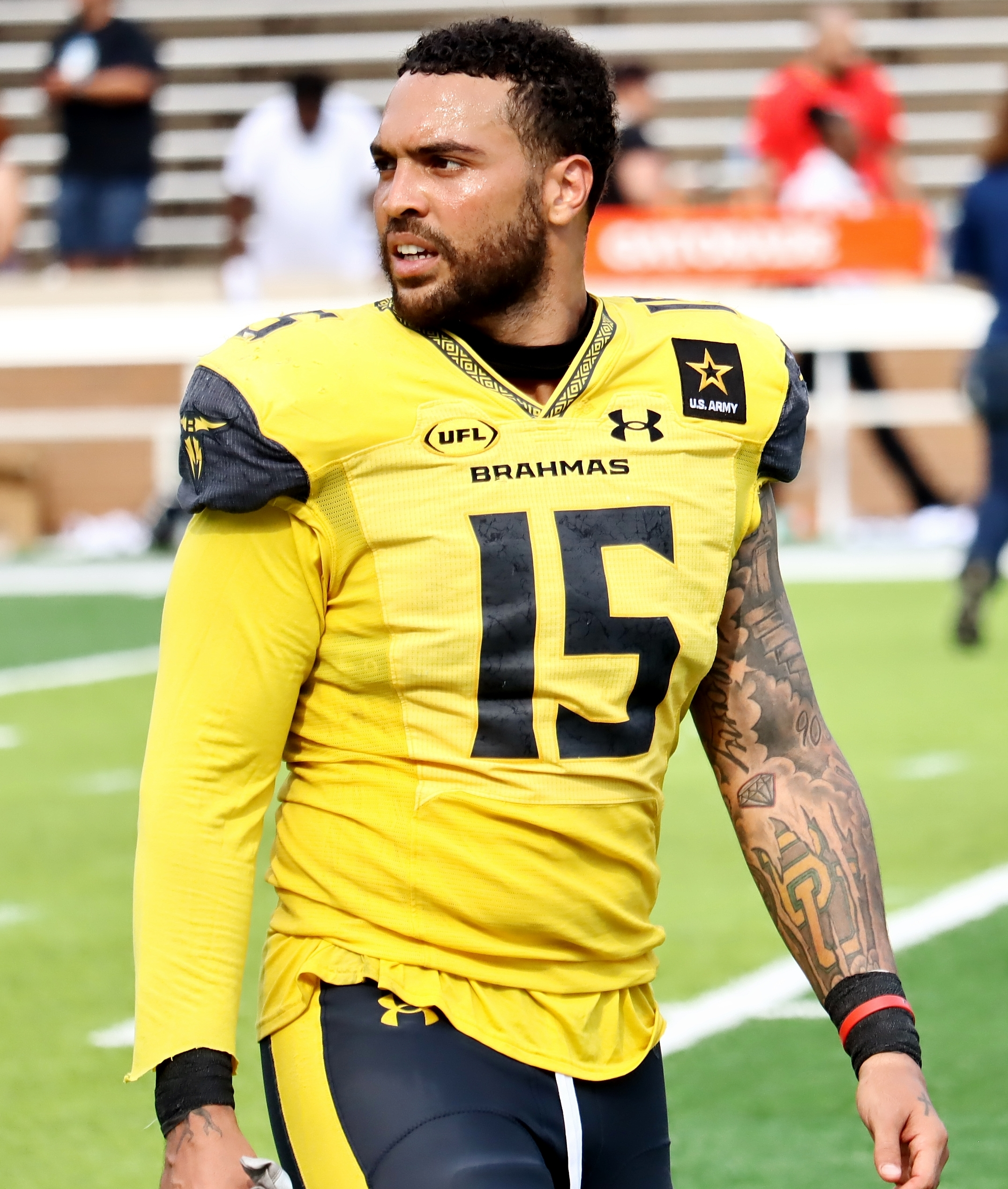
- Williams with the San Antonio Brahmas in 2024

No. 15 – St. Louis Battlehawks
- Position: Linebacker
- Roster status: Active

Personal information
- Born: May 26, 1997 (age 29); Hopkins County, Texas, U.S.
- Listed height: 6 ft 0 in (1.83 m)
- Listed weight: 234 lb (106 kg)

Career information
- High school: Paris (Paris, Texas)
- College: Baylor (2015–2019)
- NFL draft: 2020: undrafted

Career history
- Atlanta Falcons (2020)*; BC Lions (2021)*; San Antonio Brahmas (2023–2025); St. Louis Battlehawks (2026–present)
- * Offseason or practice squad member only

Awards and highlights
- All-XFL Team (2023); XFL solo tackles leader (2023); XFL combined tackles leader (2023)

Career NFL statistics as of 2023
- Total tackles: 89

Jordan M. Williams (born May 26, 1997) is an American professional football linebacker for the St. Louis Battlehawks of the United Football League (UFL). He played college football for the Baylor Bears.

== College career ==
Williams redshirted his freshman season in 2015 and did not play. In 2016, Williams played in 13 games, recording 29 tackles, 3 TFL's, 1 sack, and 1 forced fumble. In 2017, Williams played in 12 games, recording 38 tackles, 3 TFL's, 1 sack, and 1 forced fumble. In 2018, Williams played in 13 games, recording 52 tackles, 3 pass deflections, and 4 TFL's. In 2019, Williams played in 14 games, recording 89 tackles, 9.5 TFL's, 1.5 sacks, 3 interceptions, 11 pass deflections, 2 forced fumbles and 1 fumble recovery. Throughout the span of Williams's career with the Baylor Bears, he had 208 tackles, 3.5 sacks, and forced four fumbles. Willams participated in the Big 12 Championship Game and the sug Williams was described as a key figure in Baylor's success in 2017, after the dismissal of their former head coach in 2016, and going on to reach Big 12 Championship Game and the Sugar Bowl.

== Professional career ==
Pre-draft measurables
| Height | Weight |
|---|---|
| 5 ft 11 3/4 in (1.82 m) | 223 lb (101 kg) |
Values from Pro Day

=== Atlanta Falcons ===
Williams went undrafted in the 2020 NFL draft, but was signed to the Atlanta Falcons as a free agent on April 27, 2020. He was waived on August 2.

=== BC Lions ===
Williams signed with the BC Lions of the Canadian Football League (CFL) on December 16, 2020, joining rookie Jordan Williams from East Carolina University. He was released on July 26, 2021.

=== San Antonio Brahmas ===
Williams was drafted by the San Antonio Brahmas of the XFL on January 5, 2023, in the XFL Supplemental Draft. He was the second-to-last player to be chosen for the team. Williams played in 10 games while recording 89 tackles and 12 tackles-for-loss. Williams led the XFL in tackles during the 2023 season. Williams was also selected to the All-XFL Team and has been noted to being one of the most prolific tacklers.

After the 2023 season, Williams tried out for the Carolina Panthers of the National Football League (NFL). Williams re-signed with the Brahmas on January 29, 2024, and again on August 26, 2024.

=== Birmingham Stallions ===
On October 3, 2025, Williams signed with the Birmingham Stallions.

=== St. Louis Battlehawks ===
On January 13, 2026, Williams was selected by the St. Louis Battlehawks in the 2026 UFL Draft.

== Personal life ==
Outside of football, Williams is also an artist and tattoo artist. Williams acknowledged being called a role model, and says he wants to be a positive influence in someone's life, and stated he aspired to give back to youth in his community of Paris, Texas
