= Wade Phillips =

American football coach (born 1947)

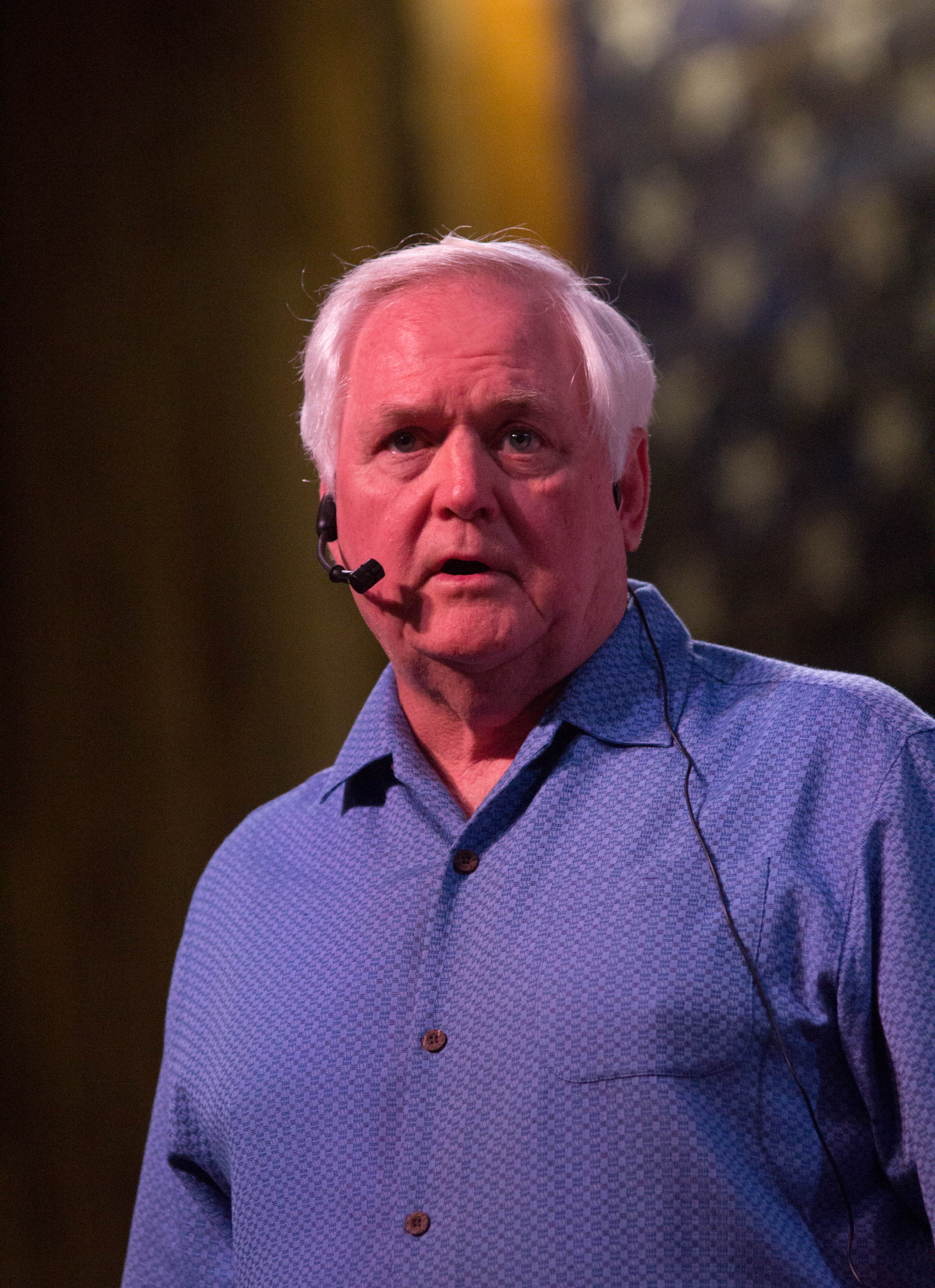
- Phillips in 2017

Personal information
- Born: June 21, 1947 (age 79); Orange, Texas, U.S.

Career information
- High school: Port Neches–Groves (TX)
- College: Houston (1966–1968)
- NFL draft: 1969: undrafted

Career history
- Houston (1969) Graduate assistant; Lutcher Stark HS (TX) (1970–1972) Defensive coordinator; Oklahoma State (1973–1974) Linebackers coach; Kansas (1975) Defensive line coach; Houston Oilers (1976–1980) Defensive line coach; New Orleans Saints (1981–1985); Defensive coordinator (1981–1985); Interim head coach (1985); Philadelphia Eagles (1986–1988) Defensive coordinator & linebackers coach; Denver Broncos (1989–1994); Defensive coordinator (1989–1992); Head coach (1993–1994); Buffalo Bills (1995–2000); Defensive coordinator (1995–1997); Head coach (1998–2000); Atlanta Falcons (2002–2003); Defensive coordinator (2002–2003); Interim head coach (2003); San Diego Chargers (2004–2006) Defensive coordinator; Dallas Cowboys (2007–2010) Head coach; Houston Texans (2011–2013); Defensive coordinator (2011–2013); Interim head coach (2013); Denver Broncos (2015–2016) Defensive coordinator; Los Angeles Rams (2017–2019) Defensive coordinator; Houston Roughnecks (2023) Head coach; San Antonio Brahmas (2024–2025) Head coach

Awards and highlights
- As coach: Super Bowl champion (50); AP NFL Assistant Coach of the Year (2015)

Head coaching record
- Regular season: NFL: 82–64 (.562); XFL/UFL: 14–9 (.609)
- Postseason: NFL: 1–5 (.167); XFL/UFL: 1–2 (.333)
- Career: 98–80 (.551)
- Coaching profile at Pro Football Reference

Harold Wade Phillips (born June 21, 1947) is an American football coach. He has served as the head coach of the Denver Broncos, Buffalo Bills, Dallas Cowboys, Houston Roughnecks, and San Antonio Brahmas. He has also served as an interim head coach for the New Orleans Saints, Atlanta Falcons, and Houston Texans. Additionally, Phillips has long been considered to be among the best defensive coordinators in the NFL. In his long career, he has served as defensive coordinator in eight separate stints with seven different franchises (twice with the Denver Broncos). Multiple players under Phillips' system have won Defensive Player of the Year: Reggie White, Bryce Paup, Bruce Smith, J. J. Watt, and Aaron Donald. Others under Phillips have won Defensive Rookie of the Year: Mike Croel and Shawne Merriman. In Phillips' lone Super Bowl victory, a defensive player would be named Super Bowl MVP: Von Miller.

== Early career ==
Phillips attended Port Neches–Groves High School in Port Neches, Texas, and went to the University of Houston, where he was a three-year starter at linebacker from 1966 to 1968. He held the school record for career assisted tackles (228) until 2011 when the record was broken by Marcus McGraw.

Phillips began his coaching career as a graduate assistant to Bill Yeoman at the University of Houston in 1969. From 1970 to 1972, he was the defensive coordinator at the former Lutcher Stark High School (now West Orange-Stark High School) in Orange, Texas. He then coached the linebackers at Oklahoma State University from 1973 to 1974, under his father, Bum Phillips, who was OSU's defensive coordinator at that time. In 1975, Phillips coached the defensive line at the University of Kansas under head coach Bud Moore.

== Coaching career ==
Phillips began his professional coaching career with the Houston Oilers, head-coached by his father. He served as the linebackers coach in 1976, and the defensive line coach from 1977 to 1980.

Phillips remained on his father's staff as the pair headed for New Orleans. Bum stepped down as head coach of a struggling Saints team in late 1985, and Phillips stepped in as interim head coach. The Saints routed the eventual NFC West champion Los Angeles Rams 29–3 in his first game at the helm, but finished with losses to the Cardinals, 49ers, and Falcons. Phillips was interviewed for the job permanently in January 1986 by new Saints president and general manager Jim Finks, but the position went to Jim Mora, the highly successful coach of the United States Football League's Philadelphia/Baltimore Stars.

Phillips spent the next three years as the defensive coordinator of the Philadelphia Eagles under Buddy Ryan. During Phillips' tenure in Philadelphia, defensive end Reggie White recorded 21 sacks in just 12 games in 1987, and the Eagles won the NFC East championship in 1988. Phillips' last game with the Eagles was the infamous Fog Bowl vs. the Chicago Bears in the NFC divisional playoffs.

=== Denver Broncos ===
Phillips then spent four seasons as the defensive coordinator for the Denver Broncos. The Broncos reached Super Bowl XXIV, where they lost to the San Francisco 49ers, 55–10. Phillips replaced Dan Reeves as head coach for the Broncos in 1993, but was fired after a mediocre 1994 season in which management felt he lost control of the team.

=== Buffalo Bills ===
Phillips spent two seasons as the Buffalo Bills defensive coordinator under Hall of Fame coach Marv Levy. After Levy's retirement in 1998, the Bills hired Phillips as head coach. Phillips enjoyed a successful coaching stop in Buffalo, but a loss to the Titans in the 1999 playoffs haunted Phillips for the rest of his tenure. Prior to the game, Phillips made the controversial decision to start Rob Johnson at quarterback, after Doug Flutie was the starter the whole year and led the team to the playoffs. Following an 8–8 record in 2000, owner Ralph Wilson fired Phillips after Phillips refused to fire special teams coach Ronnie Jones.

=== Dallas Cowboys ===
On February 8, 2007, Phillips was named the head coach of the Dallas Cowboys, replacing the retired Bill Parcells. This was the most successful coaching stint for Phillips. He was chosen after Jerry Jones interviewed 10 potential replacements, including former Cowboys and former San Francisco 49ers offensive coordinator Norv Turner, former Chicago Bears defensive coordinator Ron Rivera, and former Cowboys quarterback Jason Garrett. In the 2007 NFL playoffs, he led the Cowboys to another playoff loss, making his playoff record 0–4. The Cowboys failed to make the playoffs in 2008, as the season ended with a 44–6 loss to the Philadelphia Eagles, preventing a wild card playoff berth.

Prior to the 2009 season, Phillips also took over as defensive coordinator, replacing the fired Brian Stewart. Phillips called defensive plays for the final 10 games of the 2008 season after Stewart was stripped of the responsibilities. On January 9, 2010, in the 2009–10 playoffs, Phillips' Cowboys defeated the Eagles in the wild card round, ending the club's 13-year playoff win drought (6 games total, Phillips was only coach for one of those losses) and earning Phillips his first playoff win. Following the 2009 season, Phillips signed a contract extension through the 2011 season. However, he was fired by the Cowboys on November 8, 2010, following the second-worst start in franchise history (one win in their first eight games) punctuated by a 45–7 loss to the Green Bay Packers. Garrett was named interim head coach, then permanent successor, and held the position through 2019.

=== Houston Texans ===
On January 5, 2011, Phillips was hired as the defensive coordinator of the Houston Texans, replacing Frank Bush, who was released by Texans owner Bob McNair. The Texans defense made major improvements on defense in Phillips' first year calling Houston's defense. Houston allowed the fourth-fewest points in the league in 2011 (compared to fourth-most in 2010), the second-fewest yards allowed (third-most in 2010) and third-fewest yards per play (4.8, compared to 6.0, second-worst in 2010). On November 3, 2013, Texans head coach Gary Kubiak collapsed at the end of the first half of the Texans-Colts game; he was then hospitalized at a local hospital. In Kubiak's absence, Phillips was given the head coaching duties as the acting head coach for the remainder of the game. On November 6, 2013, the Texans and Kubiak decided to temporarily hand Phillips the head coaching duties, and named him the interim head coach until Kubiak was medically cleared to return. Exactly one month later, Kubiak was fired after his team had lost 11 games in a row. Once again, Phillips served as interim head coach for the Texans until the end of the season, when former Penn State head coach and New England Patriots offensive coordinator Bill O'Brien was hired as the new head coach. When Phillips was dismissed by Houston, this ended a continuous run where he had coached football at the high school, college, and NFL levels.

=== Denver Broncos (second stint) ===
On January 28, 2015, Phillips reunited with Gary Kubiak, joining the latter's staff as the defensive coordinator on the Denver Broncos. It would be Phillips' second stint serving that role under Kubiak, as well as his second stint at that position with the team.

Phillips replaced his predecessor's complex wait-and-react scheme with a simple style of going after the ball, making Denver the top-ranked defense that season, which carried the team to a 12–4 record and the number one seed in the AFC despite their offensive struggles. In Super Bowl 50, played on February 7, 2016, in Santa Clara, California, the game was seen by some as a contest between Phillips and Carolina Panthers offensive coordinator Mike Shula, as both of them were sons of well-known NFL coaches, and as Carolina had the top-ranked offense in the 2015 regular season. Denver's defense shut down Carolina and Cam Newton in a 24–10 victory, giving Phillips the first Super Bowl victory of his career.

Following the retirement of Kubiak as head coach after the 2016 season, Phillips was replaced by Joe Woods as the defensive coordinator for the Broncos.

=== Los Angeles Rams ===
After a successful stint with the Denver Broncos, Phillips left to become defensive coordinator of the Los Angeles Rams, alongside new head coach Sean McVay.

In Super Bowl LIII, Phillips' defense was credited with keeping the New England Patriots and Tom Brady out of the end zone until the fourth quarter, as the Rams only trailed by a field goal for the first three quarters despite the Patriots' offense having the majority of possession. The Patriots' offense had to resort to running the ball often, eventually tiring out the Rams defensive line. However, the Rams' top-ranked offense that game was stifled and they lost to the Patriots, 13–3.

On January 6, 2020, the Rams announced they would not be renewing his contract. This followed their 2019 season in which the Rams went 9–7 and failed to make the playoffs. His 82 career wins as an NFL head coach equals the number of wins his father had as an NFL head coach.

=== Houston Roughnecks ===
In April 2022, Phillips was announced as a Head Coach for an XFL Team. It was later revealed in July 2022 that he would be coaching the Houston Roughnecks. Phillips finished with a 7–3 record, while earning their first playoff berth and clinching first place in the South Division. The Roughnecks were eliminated by the Arlington Renegades in the South Division title game in the playoffs.

=== San Antonio Brahmas ===
On December 28, 2023, San Antonio Brahmas head coach Hines Ward resigned from the Brahmas after finishing with a 3–7 record in 2023, in response to a change in contract structure. Phillips agreed to take the Brahmas Head Coaching job along with his former Roughnecks Offensive Coordinator A.J. Smith. Phillips led San Antonio to an 8–3 record in 2024. The team had one of the UFL's top defenses and only gave up a League-best 15.3 points per game. San Antonio reached the UFL Championship against the Birmingham Stallions.

Phillips, who had missed much of the offseason due to declining health, suffered a medical emergency during the Brahmas' April 13 game against the Michigan Panthers, forcing Payton Pardee, who had just been promoted to offensive coordinator that week due to Smith's resignation, to take over head coaching duties for the remainder of the game. He took a personal leave of absence for the remainder of the 2025 season on April 16, 2025, naming Pardee as his successor. The Phillips and Pardee families had a long personal connection, dating to when Phillips's father Bum had coached Pardee's grandfather Jack Pardee in college.

Phillips stated that he had recovered from the illness he had suffered during the season and was "in good health," following false rumors of his death in September 2025. He stated that the health problems he had suffered were due to a bad reaction to medication, which had since been rectified; he also had stated that the UFL had offered him his job with the Brahmas back, an offer that he was not sure he was going to take and was rescinded following the team's surprise shuttering at the hands of Mike Repole in early October. Phillips gave his blessing of the return of the Houston Gamblers brand as part of the changes.

== Head coaching record ==
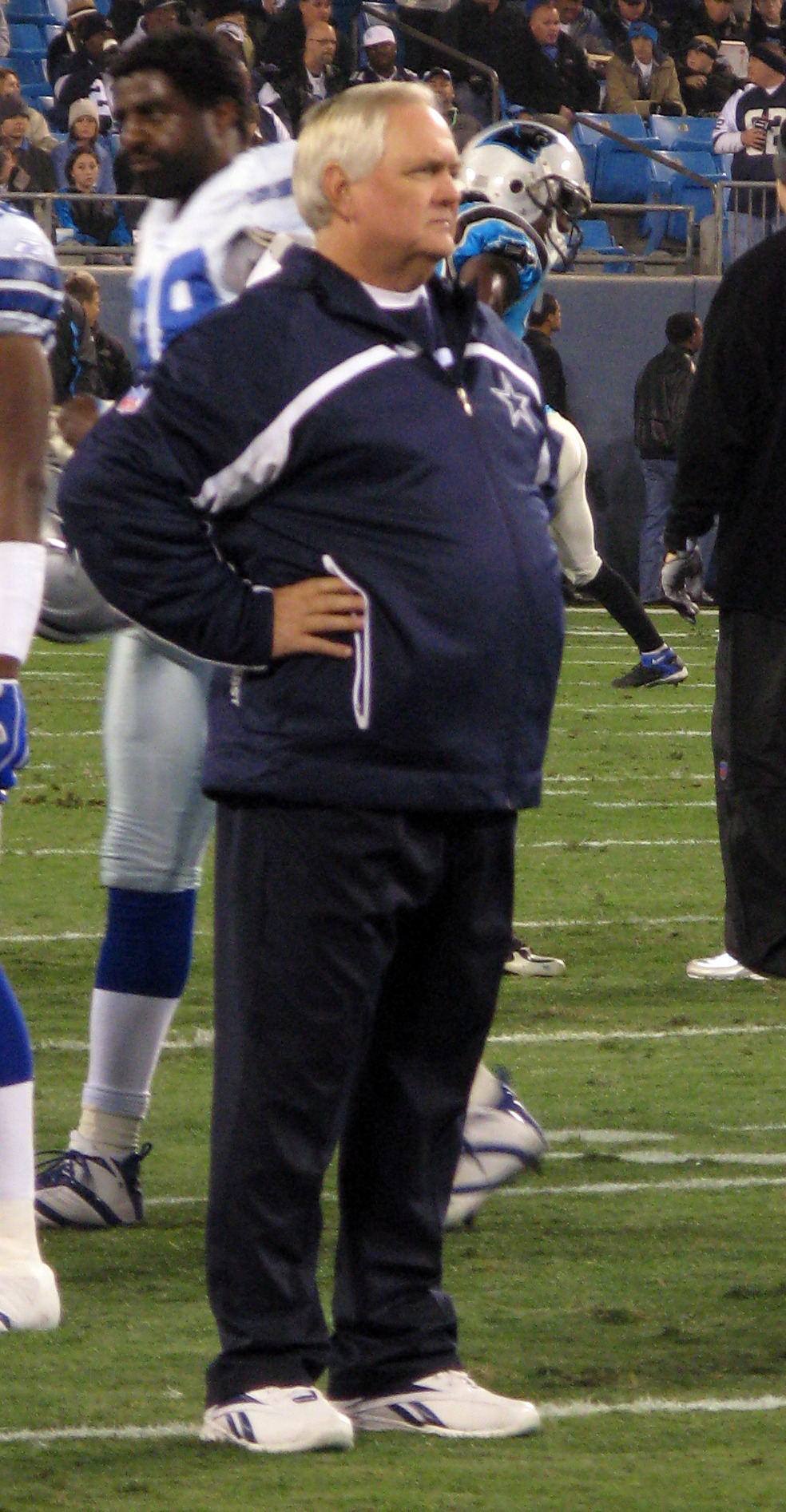
Phillips with the Dallas Cowboys in 2007

Counting head coaching jobs as well as interim stints, Phillips has served as head coach for more teams (six) than any other person in NFL history.

=== NFL ===
Team	Year	Regular season					Postseason			
Team	Year	Won	Lost	Ties	Win %	Finish	Won	Lost	Win %	Result
NO*	1985	1	3	0	.250	3rd in NFC West	–	–	–	–
NO Total		1	3	0	.250		–	–	–	
DEN	1993	9	7	0	.563	3rd in AFC West	0	1	.000	Lost to Los Angeles Raiders in AFC Wild Card Game
DEN	1994	7	9	0	.438	4th in AFC West	–	–	–	–
DEN Total		16	16	0	.500		0	1	.000	
BUF	1998	10	6	0	.625	3rd in AFC East	0	1	.000	Lost to Miami Dolphins in AFC Wild Card Game
BUF	1999	11	5	0	.688	2nd in AFC East	0	1	.000	Lost to Tennessee Titans in AFC Wild Card Game
BUF	2000	8	8	0	.500	4th in AFC East	–	–	–	–
BUF Total		29	19	0	.604		0	2	.000	
ATL*	2003	2	1	0	.667	4th in NFC South	–	–	–	–
ATL Total		2	1	0	.667		–	–	–	
DAL	2007	13	3	0	.813	1st in NFC East	0	1	.000	Lost to New York Giants in NFC Divisional Game
DAL	2008	9	7	0	.563	3rd in NFC East	–	–	–	–
DAL	2009	11	5	0	.688	1st in NFC East	1	1	.500	Lost to Minnesota Vikings in NFC Divisional Game
DAL	2010	1	7	0	.125	Fired	–	–	–	
DAL Total		34	22	0	.607		1	2	.333	
HOU*	2013	0	3	0	.000	4th in AFC South	–	–	–	–
HOU Total		0	3	0	.000		–	–	–	
Total		82	64	0	.562		1	5	.167	

* Interim head coach

=== XFL/UFL ===
League	Team	Year	Regular season				Postseason			
League	Team	Year	Won	Lost	Win %	Finish	Won	Lost	Win %	Result
XFL	HOU	2023	7	3	.700	1st in South Division	0	1	.000	Lost to Arlington Renegades in South Division Championship Game
UFL	SA	2024	7	3	.700	2nd in XFL Conference	1	1	.500	Lost to Birmingham Stallions in UFL Championship Game
UFL	SA	2025	0	3	.000	Medical leave	–	–	–	–
Total			14	9	.609		1	2	.333	

== Personal life ==
Phillips is the son of former NFL coach Bum Phillips and Helen Wilson Phillips. He adored his father, both personally and professionally, stating, "I was blessed to have him as a father and coach. I got to coach with him for 11 years. He taught me everything I know about coaching. He taught me right and wrong. He taught me to enjoy life."

Phillips' son, Wes Phillips, is currently the offensive coordinator for the Minnesota Vikings.

Phillips and wife Laurie met in 1964 at Port Neches–Groves High School, where he was the quarterback of the football team and she was the head cheerleader.

He also appeared in several movies and/or television shows, including the western Bandolero.
