= Houston Roughnecks (XFL) =

UFL team based in Houston, Texas

Logo

General information
- Founded: 2018
- Stadium: TDECU Stadium (2020, 2023)
- Headquartered: Houston, Texas
- Colors: Navy, red

Personnel
- Owners: Alpha Acquico, LLC: (RedBird Capital Partners; Dwayne Johnson; Dany Garcia); Fox Corporation
- Head coach: June Jones (2020); Wade Phillips (2023)

Team history
- Houston Roughnecks (2020–2023)

League / conference affiliations
- XFL (2020–2023): West Division (2020); South Division (2023)

Championships
- Division championships: 1: XFL South: 2023

Playoff appearances (1)
- XFL: 2023

The Houston Roughnecks were a professional American football team based in Houston, Texas. The Roughnecks competed in the XFL football league. The team was founded by Vince McMahon’s Alpha Entertainment and were an owned-and-operated by Dwayne Johnson’s Alpha Acquico. The Roughnecks played their home games at TDECU Stadium. The Roughnecks had a franchise regular season record of 12–3 (.800), the highest win percentage among all XFL teams (tied with DC Defenders).

Following the merger of the USFL and XFL in 2024 as the United Football League, the Roughnecks branding was transferred to the former Houston Gamblers, which had competed in the USFL in 2022 and 2023 as a traveling team.

== History ==
=== McMahon Era (2020) ===
On December 5, 2018, Houston was announced as one of eight cities that would join the newly reformed XFL, as well as Seattle, St. Louis, Los Angeles, New York, DC, Tampa Bay, and Dallas. On May 13, 2019, June Jones left his position with the Hamilton Tiger-Cats to become Houston's head coach. The XFL confirmed the hire May 20.

On October 15, 2019, the Roughnecks announced their first player in team history, being assigned former Temple Owls QB P. J. Walker.

On February 8, 2020, the Roughnecks defeated the Los Angeles Wildcats in the second game in league history by a score of 37–17. The XFL announced that the remainder of the 2020 XFL season had been canceled due to the COVID-19 pandemic. The team finished with an undefeated regular season 5–0 record. On April 10, 2020, the XFL suspended operations, with all employees, players, and staff being terminated.

=== Dwayne Johnson and Dany Garcia Era (2023) ===
On August 3, 2020, it was reported that a consortium led by Dwayne "The Rock" Johnson, Dany Garcia, and Gerry Cardinale (through Cardinale's fund RedBird Capital Partners) purchased the XFL for $15 million just hours before an auction could take place; the purchase received court approval on August 7, 2020. The XFL hired Wade Phillips as a head coach on April 13, 2022, with the expectation that he would be coaching the Houston team. On July 24, 2022, the return of a Houston XFL franchise was confirmed, as well as the hiring of Wade Phillips. On October 31, 2022, the XFL officially announced that the Roughnecks name would be returning, with a new logo.

==== Logo change ====
The Roughnecks' 2020 logo, discontinued under pressure from the NFL in 2021.

On January 8, 2021, it was revealed that the NFL filed an opposition against the XFL's trademark application for the Houston Roughnecks logo on December 28, 2020, claiming that the logo was too similar to the Houston Oilers logo. It was then later revealed that the NFL filed another trademark opposition to the Roughneck's secondary logo on behalf of the New England Patriots, claiming that the secondary logo was too similar to the Patriots' current logo. On April 7, 2021, it was revealed that the two logos were abandoned "with prejudice" which means that new applications for the logos could not be made.

The Roughnecks revealed their new logo on October 31, 2022, which is similar in shape to the previous derrick logo but with greater emphasis on the H (stylized to appear as if constructed from steel girders) and the star portion lowered so that the logo no longer explicitly resembles a derrick.

=== Merger with the Houston Gamblers ===
The Roughnecks released a large portion of its roster ahead of the 2024 season and reassigned Phillips and his staff to the San Antonio Brahmas. At the same time, the United States Football League, ahead of its planned merger with the XFL for 2024, indicated that its putative Houston team, the Gamblers (which never played in Houston during its two years in that league), would be one of the four surviving teams in said merger in a notice to its players union. With the announcement of the merger on December 31, The Washington Post reported that the merged league's Houston team would take on the Roughnecks identity. The UFL confirmed this on January 1, 2024. The former Gamblers would play the next two seasons under the Roughnecks brand before incoming owner Mike Repole chose to discontinue it in favor of returning to the more "iconic" Gamblers identity prior to the 2026 season.

== Coach history ==
=== Head coach history ===
#	Name	Term	Regular season				Playoffs			Awards
#	Name	Term	GC	W	L	Win %	GC	W	L	Awards
Houston Roughnecks
1	June Jones	2020	5	5	0	1.000	-	-	-	*2020 XFL Head Coach of the Year
2	Wade Phillips	2023	10	7	3	.700	1	0	1	

=== Offensive coordinator history ===
#	Name	Term	Regular season				Playoffs			Awards
#	Name	Term	GC	W	L	Win %	GC	W	L	Awards
Houston Roughnecks
1	Chris Miller	2020	5	5	0	1.000	-	-	-	
2	A. J. Smith	2023	10	7	3	.700	1	0	1	

=== Defensive coordinator history ===
#	Name	Term	Regular season				Playoffs			Awards
#	Name	Term	GC	W	L	Win %	GC	W	L	Awards
Houston Roughnecks
1	Ted Cottrell	2020	5	5	0	1.000	-	-	-	
2	Brian Stewart	2023	10	7	3	.700	1	0	1	

== Player history ==
=== Current NFL players ===
XFL Season	Pos	Name	NFL team
2023	WR	Michael Bandy	Denver Broncos
2023	DT	Jack Heflin	New York Jets

=== Notable players ===
XFL Season	Pos	Name	Notes
2020	QB	Connor Cook	Former Oakland Raiders Quarterback, 2016 4th Round Pick
2020	DE	Kony Ealy	Former Carolina Panthers Defensive Tackle, 2014 2nd Round Pick
2023	SS	Sean Davis	Former Pittsburgh Steelers Defensive Back, 2016 2nd Round Pick

=== Overall regular season record vs. opponents ===
Team	Record	Win %
Arlington Renegades	3–0	1.000
San Antonio Brahmas	2–0	1.000
Vegas Vipers	2–0	1.000
Orlando Guardians	2–0	1.000
Los Angeles Wildcats	1–0	1.000
Seattle Sea Dragons	1–1	.500
St. Louis Battlehawks	1–1	.500
DC Defenders	0–1	.000

=== Season-by-season record ===
XFL champions^{§}	Division champions^{^}	Wild Card berth^{#}

Season	Team	League	Conference	Division	Regular season			Postseason results	Awards	Head coaches	Pct.
Season	Team	League	Conference	Division	Finish	W	L	Postseason results	Awards	Head coaches	Pct.
2020	2020	XFL		West	1st	5	0	Season Suspended after 5 games due to COVID-19	June Jones (COY)	June Jones	1.000
2021	No Season										
2022	No Season										
2023	2023	XFL		South	1st ^{^}	7	3	Lost Division Finals (Renegades) 11–26		Wade Phillips	.700
Total						12	3	All-time regular season record (2020–2023)			.800
Total						0	1	All-time postseason record (2020–2023)			.000
Total						12	4	All-time regular season and postseason record (2020–2023)			.750

== Records ==
All-time Roughnecks leaders
Leader	Player	Record	Years with Roughnecks
Passing yards	Brandon Silvers	1,551 passing yards	2023
Passing Touchdowns	P. J. Walker	15 passing touchdowns	2020
Rushing yards	Max Borghi	310 rushing yards	2023
Rushing Touchdowns	Max Borghi	6 rushing touchdowns	2023
Receiving yards	Cam Phillips	455 receiving yards	2020
Receiving Touchdowns	Cam Phillips	9 receiving touchdowns	2020
Receptions	Cedric Byrd	37 receptions	2023
Tackles	Tavante Beckett	63 tackles	2023
Sacks	Trent Harris	9.5 sacks	2023
Interceptions	Ajene Harris	5 interceptions	2020–2023
Coaching wins	Wade Phillips	7 wins	2023
