= San Antonio Brahmas =

UFL (2024) team based in San Antonio, Texas

Logo	Wordmark
- Uniforms

General information
- Founded: July 25, 2022; 4 years ago
- Folded: 2025
- Stadium: Alamodome; San Antonio, Texas
- Colors: Dark gray, yellow, light gray
- Website: www.theufl.com/teams/san-antonio

Personnel
- Owners: Fox Corporation (50%), Dany Garcia, Dwayne Johnson, RedBird Capital Partners (50%)
- General manager: Marc Lillibridge
- Head coach: Payton Pardee

Team history
- San Antonio Brahmas (2023–2025)

Home fields
- Alamodome (2023–2025)

League / conference affiliations
- XFL (2023): South Division (2023); United Football League (2024–2025): XFL Conference (2024–2025)

Championships
- Conference championships: 1: XFL: 2024

Playoff appearances (1)
- UFL: 2024

The San Antonio Brahmas were a professional American football team based in San Antonio, Texas. The Brahmas competed in the United Football League (UFL) as a member of the XFL Conference. The team was owned and operated by Dwayne Johnson's Alpha Acquico and Fox Corporation. The Brahmas played their home games at the Alamodome. The Brahmas had a franchise regular season record of 11–11 (.500).

== History ==
The XFL played its first season in 2020 with eight teams, as a reboot to the league of the same name that played in 2001. After five games, it was suspended due to the COVID-19 pandemic. Prior to the league's April bankruptcy, the XFL had begun discussions with San Antonio to relocate one of its eight teams there. It had been unavailable as a market at the time of the league's launching due to the Alliance of American Football placing the San Antonio Commanders (that league's best-attended team) there, and because of the XFL's policy at the time of preferring cities that already had NFL franchises.

After XFL founder Vince McMahon sold the league to a consortium led by businesswoman Dany Garcia and her ex-husband, business partner, and former WWE wrestler Dwayne Johnson, and the league did not play in 2021 or 2022, it was announced the league would return for the 2023 season. In March 2022, rumors of a San Antonio XFL team again emerged after the league hired Reggie Barlow, reportedly to serve as the team's coach; Barlow instead would be assigned to the DC Defenders. The league announced in July 2022 that three teams from the 2020 would be replaced, and five would return, and that San Antonio would be among the three new cities, ultimately replacing the LA Wildcats.

The July announcement revealed San Antonio's head coach as Hines Ward and their stadium as the Alamodome. On October 31, 2022, the logo was revealed and the team name was announced as the San Antonio Brahmas. The Brahma name is of Hindu origin, coming from the Hindu creator god; more directly, the Brahmas name comes from the American Brahman, a hybrid species cross-bred from sacred zebu and American cattle that Johnson has long used as a personal mascot. The XFL Brahmas team jerseys were revealed on December 8; their uniforms will be yellow-gold and grey. In the 2023 XFL draft, the Brahmas were allocated quarterbacks Jawon Pass and Anthony Russo and used their top pick to select running back Jacques Patrick. On February 22, 2023, the XFL's director of communications Jeff Altstadter announced the firing of team executive Mike Sheehan.

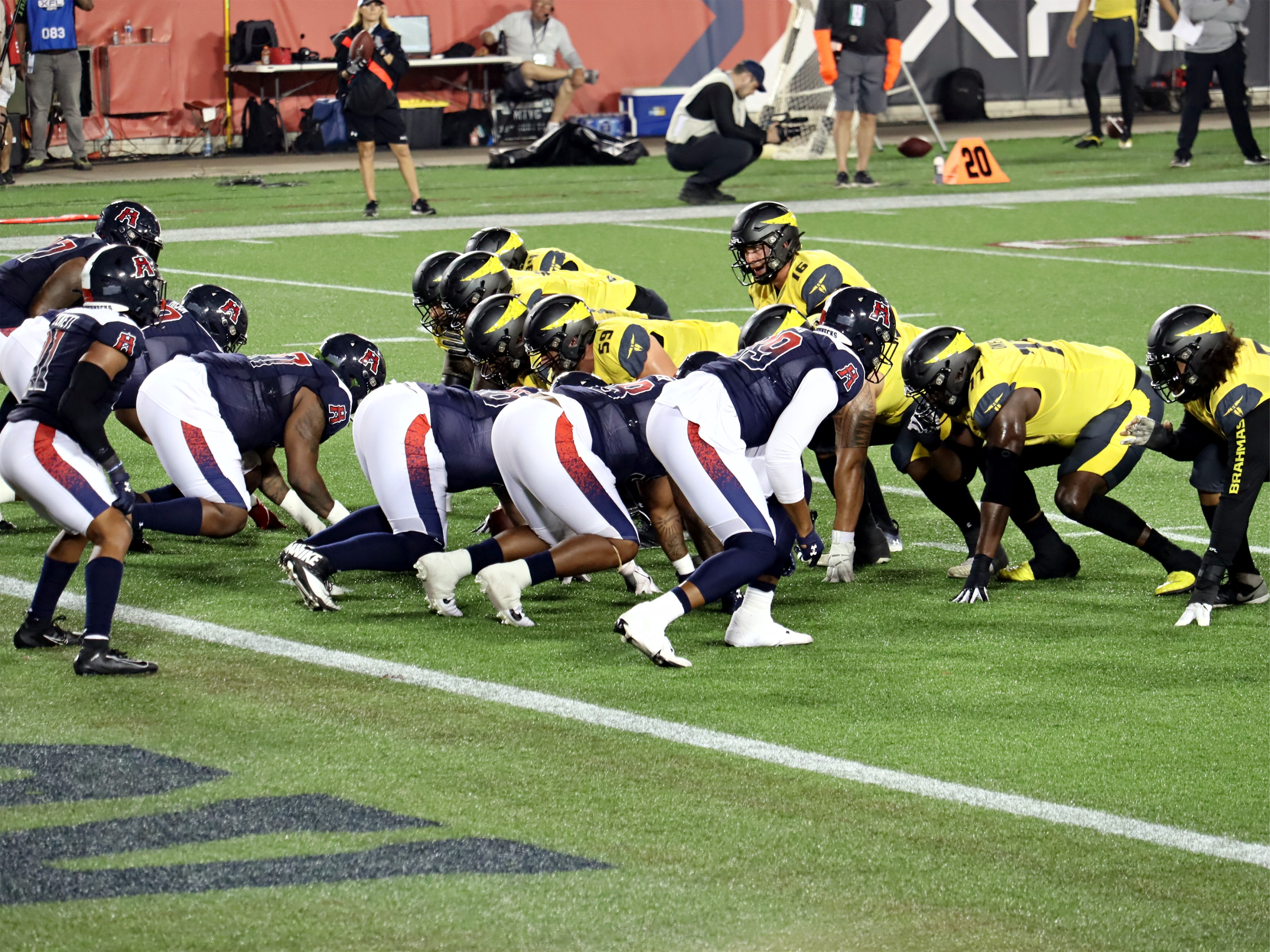
A game between the Brahmas and Houston Roughnecks during their inaugural season in 2023

The 2023 XFL season began on February 18, 2023, and featured 40 regular season games. The Brahmas compiled an overall record of 3–7 during their inaugural season, missing the playoffs.

On December 28, 2023, Ward resigned from the Brahmas after finishing with a 3–7 record in 2023, in response to a change in contract structure. Houston Roughnecks Head Coach Wade Phillips replaced Ward, a maneuver that would allow the Roughnecks identity to be cleared and used for the former Houston Gamblers.

In September 2023, Axios reported that the XFL was in advanced talks with the USFL to merge the two leagues prior to the start of their 2024 seasons. On September 28, 2023, the XFL and USFL announced their intent to merge with details surrounding the merger to be announced at a later date. The merger would also require regulatory approval. In October 2023 the XFL filed a trademark application for the name "United Football League". On November 30, 2023, Garcia announced via her Instagram page that the leagues had received regulatory approval for the merger and were finalizing plans for a "combined season" to begin March 30, 2024. The merger was made official on December 31, 2023.

Though Phillips had been signed through the 2025 season, his health began a severe decline during the offseason, limiting his presence during training camp and, according to offensive coordinator A. J. Smith, creating a leadership vacuum that led to a power struggle between him and other organizational forces. Smith had made an effort to recruit A. J. McCarron, who had fallen out with the rival St. Louis Battlehawks that offseason, only to be vetoed by Brahmas upper management. Smith resigned two weeks into the 2025 season amid alleged interference in his offensive playcalling, followed a week later by Phillips being forced to take a leave of absence after suffering a health emergency midway through the April 13 game. Special teams coach Payton Pardee, the grandson of Jack Pardee (a friend and associate of Phillips's father Bum), ascended to head coach and offensive coordinator April 16; Pardee hired Jack Welch as his own replacement. Phillips would later attribute his health issues to a medication error that was eventually corrected and that he was back in good health by fall 2025.

On October 3, the UFL announced the closure of the Brahmas organization. A statement from the league explicitly cited "new owners" (Mike Repole) and an insistence that the Alamodome was too large for Repole's vision for the league, and that if the UFL were to return, it would be no sooner than 2028 and only if a new stadium were constructed (which no such stadium is planned). The closure of the Brahmas was a complete surprise, given that while multiple UFL teams had been mentioned as candidates for relocation and shuttering, San Antonio had never been included among them, and the UFL had already signed the stadium contract with the Alamodome to return to the city for 2026. Though the Alamodome had long used a strategy of keeping the upper decks closed and unlit for smaller events to provide the intimate atmosphere being sought, Repole stated in an October 7 press conference that the result "didn't look right," and this was why he shuttered the team. Players under contract were transferred to the Orlando Storm.

The Continental Football League, a third-tier minor professional league positioned below the UFL, announced plans for a replacement team, the San Antonio Toros, shortly after Repole's decision.

== Player history ==
=== Current NFL players ===
Season	Pos	Name	NFL team
2023–2024	G	Kohl Levao	New York Jets
2023–2024	LS	Rex Sunahara	Cleveland Browns
2025	TE	Thomas Gordon	Detroit Lions

=== Notable players ===
Season	Pos	Name	Notes
2023	QB	Paxton Lynch	Former Denver Broncos Quarterback, 2016 1st Round Pick
2023	RB	Kalen Ballage	Former Miami Dolphins Running Back, 2018 4th Round Pick
2024	DE	Tarell Basham	Former Dallas Cowboys Defensive End, 2017 3rd Round Pick
2024	FS	Teez Tabor	Former Detroit Lions Defensive Back, 2017 2nd Round Pick
2024	WR	Cody Latimer	Former Denver Broncos Wide Receiver, 2014 2nd Round Pick
2024	CB	Quincy Wilson	Former New York Giants Defensive Back, 2017 2nd Round Pick
2024–2025	K	Donald De La Haye	Current YouTuber, has over 5.7 million subscribers
2024–2025	RB	Anthony McFarland	Former Pittsburgh Steelers Running back, 2020 4th Round Pick
2024	CB	Cameron Dantzler	Former Minnesota Vikings Cornerback, 2020 3rd Round Pick
2025	QB	Kellen Mond	Former Minnesota Vikings Quarterback, 2021 3rd Round Pick
2025	CB	Greedy Williams	Former Cleveland Browns Cornerback, 2019 2nd Round Pick

== Coach history ==
=== Head coach history ===
#	Name	Term	Regular season				Playoffs			Awards
#	Name	Term	GC	W	L	Win %	GC	W	L	Awards
San Antonio Brahmas
1	Hines Ward	2023	10	3	7	.300	–	–	–	
2	Wade Phillips	2024–2025	13	7	6	.538	2	1	1	
3	Payton Pardee	2025	7	1	6	.143	-	-	-	

=== Offensive coordinator history ===
#	Name	Term	Regular season				Playoffs			Awards
#	Name	Term	GC	W	L	Win %	GC	W	L	Awards
San Antonio Brahmas
1	Jaime Elizondo	2023	4	1	3	.250	–	–	–	
2	Jimmie Johnson	2023	6	2	4	.333	–	–	–	
3	A. J. Smith	2024	12	7	5	.583	2	1	1	
4	Payton Pardee	2025	8	1	7	.125	-	-	-	

=== Defensive coordinator history ===
#	Name	Term	Regular season				Playoffs			Awards
#	Name	Term	GC	W	L	Win %	GC	W	L	Awards
San Antonio Brahmas
1	Jim Herrmann	2023	10	3	7	.300	–	–	–	
2	Will Reed	2024–2025	20	8	12	.400	2	1	1	

== Rivalries ==
=== Houston Roughnecks ===
The Brahmas were in-state rivals with the Houston Roughnecks. The rivalry is billed as the Lone Star Showdown (not to be confused with the Texas/Texas A&M collegiate rivalry also known as the Lone Star Showdown).

=== Overall regular season record vs. opponents ===
Team	Record	Win %
Orlando Guardians	2–0	1.000
Memphis Showboats	1–0	1.000
Michigan Panthers	1–0	1.000
Dallas Renegades	3–1	.750
Birmingham Stallions	1–1	.500
Houston Roughnecks	1–1	.500
DC Defenders	1–2	.333
St. Louis Battlehawks	1–5	.166
Seattle Sea Dragons	0–1	.000
Vegas Vipers	0–1	.000
Houston Roughnecks (XFL)	0–2	.000

- Defunct teams in light gray

=== Season by season record ===
UFL champions^{†} (2024–2025)	XFL champions^{§} (2023)	Conference champions^{*}	Division champions^{^}	Wild Card berth^{#}

Season	Team	League	Conference	Division	Regular season			Postseason results	Awards	Head coaches	Pct.
Season	Team	League	Conference	Division	Finish	W	L	Postseason results	Awards	Head coaches	Pct.
2023	2023	XFL		South	3rd	3	7			Hines Ward	.300
2024	2024	UFL	XFL^{*}		2nd^{#}	7	3	Won XFL Conference Championship (Battlehawks) 25–15; Lost 2024 UFL Championship (Stallions) 0–25		Wade Phillips	.700
2025	2025	UFL	XFL		4th	1	9			Wade Phillips & Payton Pardee	.100
Total						11	19	All-time regular season record (2023–2025)			.367
Total						1	1	All-time postseason record (2023–2025)			.500
Total						12	20	All-time regular season and postseason record (2023–2025)			.375

== Records ==
All-time Brahmas leaders
Leader	Player	Record	Years with Brahmas
Passing yards	Jack Coan	1,471 passing yards	2023
Passing touchdowns	Jack Coan Chase Garbers Quinten Dormady	6 passing touchdowns	2023 2024 2024
Rushing	Jashaun Corbin	514 rushing yards	2025
Rushing touchdowns	John Lovett	6 rushing touchdowns	2024–2025
Receiving	Jontre Kirklin	898 receiving yards	2024–2025
Receiving touchdowns	Anthony McFarland Jontre Kirklin	3 receiving touchdowns	2024–2025 2024–2025
Receptions	Jontre Kirklin	91 receptions	2024–2025
Tackles	Jordan Williams	232 tackles	2023–2025
Sacks	Delontae Scott	11.5 sacks	2023–2024
Interceptions	Kameron Kelly Teez Tabor Tenny Adewusi Tavante Beckett Jalen Elliott	2 interceptions	2023 2024 2023 2024–2025 2025
Coaching wins	Wade Phillips	8 wins	2024–p2025

=== Starting quarterbacks ===
Regular season – As of June 2, 2025

Season(s)	Quarterback(s)	Notes	Ref
2023	Jack Coan (2–5) / Reid Sinnett (0–1) / Jawon Pass (0–1) / Kurt Benkert (0–1)		
2024	Quinten Dormady (5–1) / Chase Garbers (2–2)		
2025	Kellen Mond (1–6) / Kevin Hogan (0–3)		

Postseason

Season(s)	Quarterback(s)	Notes	Ref
2024	Chase Garbers (1–1)		

Most games as starting quarterback

Name	Period	GP	GS	W	L	Pct
Jack Coan	2023	8	7	2	5	.286
Kellen Mond	2025	8	7	1	6	.143
Quinten Dormady	2024	8	6	5	1	.833
Chase Garbers	2024	5	4	2	2	.500
Kevin Hogan	2024–2025	7	3	0	3	.000
Kurt Benkert	2023	2	1	0	1	.000
Jawon Pass	2023	3	1	0	1	.000
Reid Sinnett	2023	4	1	0	1	.000

== Market overview ==
The Brahmas are the first professional football team in San Antonio since the San Antonio Commanders of the Alliance of American Football in 2019, who averaged over 28,000 fans per game. The Brahmas join the San Antonio Spurs and San Antonio FC as professional sports teams in San Antonio. The Brahmas also join the San Antonio Gunslingers as football teams located in San Antonio.

Daryl Johnston, the UFL's vice president of football operations, had been on the Commanders' staff in 2019 and had seen the potential of the market, one that could rival the UFL's strongest, the St. Louis Battlehawks, if properly managed. It remains one of the UFL's stronger markets despite declines in attendance since the Commanders' time in the city, Johnston noted the decline was partly due to business issues on the league's end that "didn’t come together the way we wanted them to at the time" of the USFL/XFL merger.

The Brahmas fan base relies on Hispanic culture and Spanish language for much of its image.
