= Tim Lewis =

American football player and coach (born 1961)

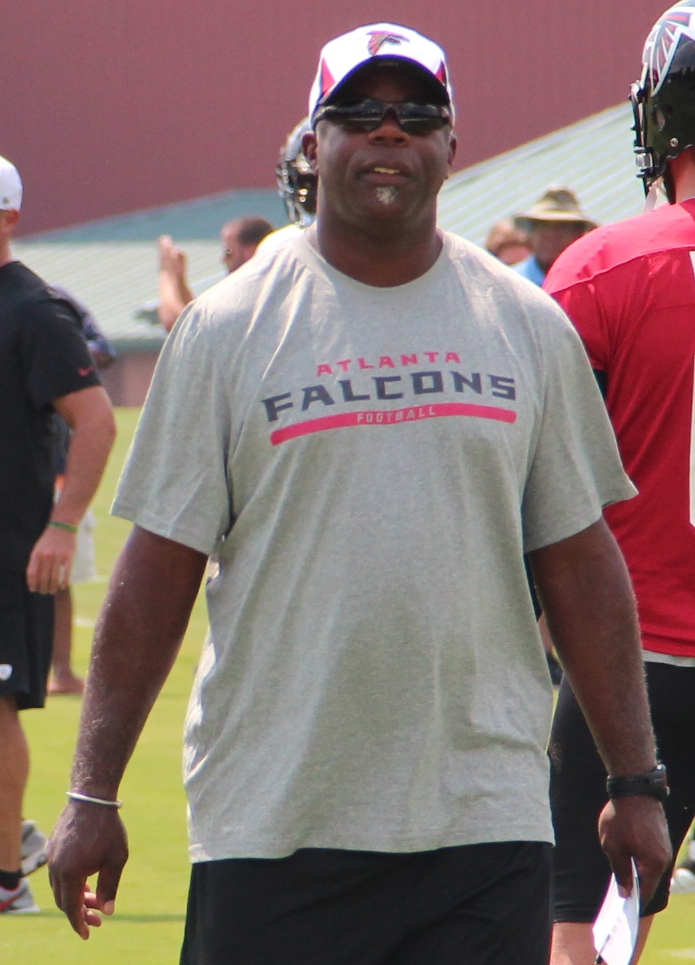
- Lewis in 2013

Biographical details
- Born: December 18, 1961 (age 64); Quakertown, Pennsylvania, U.S.
- Education: University of Pittsburgh

Playing career
- 1979–1982: Pittsburgh
- 1983–1986: Green Bay Packers
- Position: Cornerback

Coaching career (HC unless noted)
- 1987–1988: Texas A&M (GA)
- 1989–1992: SMU (DB)
- 1993–1994: Pittsburgh (DB)
- 1995–1999: Pittsburgh Steelers (DB)
- 2000–2003: Pittsburgh Steelers (DC)
- 2004–2006: New York Giants (DC)
- 2007–2008: Carolina Panthers (DB)
- 2009: Seattle Seahawks (DB)
- 2010–2014: Atlanta Falcons (DB)
- 2015: San Francisco 49ers (DB)
- 2018-2019: Pinecrest (DC)
- 2019: Birmingham Iron
- 2020: St. Louis BattleHawks (DB)
- 2022: Houston Gamblers (DC)
- 2023: Arlington Renegades (co-DC)
- 2024–2025: Boston College (DC)

Head coaching record
- Overall: 5–3

Accomplishments and honors

Championships
- As a coach: XFL (2023); As a player: 2× Eastern (1979, 1980)

Tim Lewis (born December 18, 1961) is an American football coach and former player who was most recently the defensive coordinator for the Boston College Eagles. He played college football as a cornerback for the Pittsburgh Panthers and was selected by the Green Bay Packers of the National Football League (NFL) in the first round of the 1983 NFL draft. Following a neck injury that cut his playing career short after four seasons, Lewis began serving as a coach in the collegiate and professional levels and obtained his first head coaching position with the Birmingham Iron of the Alliance of American Football (AAF) in 2019. He also served as the defensive backs coach for the St. Louis BattleHawks and co-defensive coordinator for the Arlington Renegades of the XFL.

Lewis is the younger brother of former Memphis Express General Manager Will Lewis. Louis Riddick, former NFL safety and current ESPN broadcaster, is his cousin. Robb Riddick, another of his cousins, was a running back for the Buffalo Bills for eight seasons.

== College career ==
Lewis joined the Pittsburgh Panthers in 1979, playing his freshman season on a team that included eight other future NFL players: Dan Marino, Mark May, Dwight Collins, Rickey Jackson, Russ Grimm, Jimbo Covert, Bill Maas and Hugh Green, three of whom would eventually be inducted into the Pro Football Hall of Fame. In his three seasons at Pitt, Lewis intercepted four passes and returned 26 kickoffs for 679 yards.

== Playing career ==
Lewis was a first round pick (eleventh player chosen overall) out of the University of Pittsburgh by the Green Bay Packers in the 1983 NFL draft. A standout cornerback, he was one of the more successful players on what was a relatively weak Packers team. He led or shared the team in interceptions in 1983 and 1985, finishing with a career total of 16. Lewis' 99-yard interception return for a touchdown against the Los Angeles Rams on November 18, 1984, remains the Packer team record. His career was cut short by a severe neck injury suffered in a Monday Night game against the Chicago Bears in the third week of the 1986 season.

== Coaching career ==
Beginning his coaching career in 1987 at Texas A&M, Lewis served under his former college coach at Pittsburgh, Jackie Sherrill. He would later spend time at defensive coordinator for the Pittsburgh Steelers and the New York Giants. The 2013 season marked his third year as the secondary coach for the Atlanta Falcons. In 2015, Lewis became the defensive backs coach of the San Francisco 49ers, but was let go once the season ended as part of a complete coaching overhaul. He was named the head coach of the Birmingham Iron of the Alliance of American Football on June 6, 2018. With two games remaining in the 10-week inaugural AAF season, Lewis and the Iron clinched a playoff berth, though due to the AAF's overall underfunding and ownership disputes, the playoffs were never played.

Lewis then signed on as defensive backs coach for the St. Louis BattleHawks of the XFL, a position he held until the league folded in 2020.

Following 2021 out of football, Lewis was named defensive coordinator for the Houston Gamblers of the relaunched USFL. Although Houston struggled in 2022 with a 3–7 record, all three levels of Lewis's defense had a player named to the All-USFL Team; defensive back William Likely, linebacker Donald Payne, and Defensive Player of the Year pass rusher Chris Odom.

Lewis was officially hired by the Arlington Renegades on September 13, 2022 Lewis served as co-defensive coordinator with Jay Hayes, both who among numerous St. Louis Battlehawks assistant coaches during the 2020 XFL season. Numerous Renegades defensive players had been coached by Lewis previously in the AAF, XFL, or USFL such as Aaron Adeoye, Joe Powell, Will Hill, and Donald Payne, as well as passer Luis Perez, Lewis' quarterback for the Birmingham Iron, who was acquired via trade mid-season. The Renegades only won 4 games out of 10 in the regular season, although the defense was consistently praised compared to the Renegades offense. Despite a losing regular season record, the Renegades made it into the playoffs and recorded two upset victories to win the 2023 XFL championship. On February 14, 2024, Lewis was hired by Boston College as the defensive coordinator.

On October 10, 2026, Lewis was hired as defensive coordinator for the London Guard.

== Head coaching record ==
Team	Year	Regular season					Postseason			
Team	Year	Won	Lost	Ties	Win %	Finish	Won	Lost	Win %	Result
BIR	2019	5	3	0	.625		–	–	–	–
BIR Total		5	3	0	.625		–	–	–	–
Total		5	3	0	.625		–	–	–	–
