= 2022 Philadelphia Stars season =

American professional football season

- General manager: Bart Andrus
- Head coach: Bart Andrus
- Home stadium: None

Results
- Record: 6–4
- League place: 2nd in North Division
- Playoffs: Won Division Finals (at Generals) 19–14; Lost USFL Championship (vs. Stallions) 30–33

The 2022 Philadelphia Stars season was the first season for the Philadelphia Stars as a professional American football franchise. They played as charter members of the United States Football League, one of eight teams to compete in the league for the 2022 season. The Stars technically played as a traveling team (since the entirety of the regular season will be played at Protective Stadium and Legion Field in Birmingham, Alabama) and were led by head coach Bart Andrus.

== Final roster ==
2022 Philadelphia Stars roster
| Quarterbacks (QB): 10 Case Cookus; 19 K. J. Costello; Running backs (RB): 25 Paul Terry; 35 Dexter Williams; Wide receivers (WR): 13 Maurice Alexander; 7 Devin Gray; 17 Kahlil Lewis; 14 Diondre Overton; 12 Chris Rowland; 2 Jordan Suell; Tight ends (TE): 11 Bug Howard; 84 Pro Wells | Offensive linemen (OL): 79 Alex Akingbulu T; 65 Sean Brown C; 73 Jake Burton G; 74 Blake Camper T; 78 Chris Perez C; 67 Colby Ragland T; 64 Jackson Scott-Brown G; Defensive linemen (DL): 92 Freedom Akinmoladun DE; 94 Mike Barnett DT; 50 James Crawford DE; 39 Ralph Holley DT; 90 Cedrick Lattimore DT; 97 Chris Nelson DT; 49 Antwan Owens DE; 58 Adam Rodriguez DE | Linebackers (LB): 52 Josh Banderas; 22 Te'von Coney; 30 Jordan Moore; 55 Gabe Sewell; Defensive backs (DB): 21 Cody Brown S; 29 Amani Dennis CB; 36 Ahmad Dixon S; 27 Joshua Moon S; 8 Channing Stribling CB; 4 LaDarius Wiley S; 23 Mazzi Wilkins CB; Special teams (ST): 15 Luis Aguilar K/P; 69 Ryan Navarro LS | Practice squad: 9 Brennan Eagles WR; 98 Tony Fair DT; 6 Darnell Holland RB; 75 Leon Johnson T; 70 Clay LeGault T; 1 Marcus Lewis CB; 72 Paul Nosworthy G; 39 Avery Roberts LB; 3 Bradley Sylve CB; 20 Evan Worthington S; Reserve: 5 Matt Colburn RB (IR); 78 Jahair Jones T (IR); 18 Bryan Scott QB (IR); -- Jack Tocho S (DNR); 75 Gunnar Vogel T (IR); Rookies in italics 40 active, 5 reserve, 10 practice squad |

== Staff ==
2022 Philadelphia Stars staff
| Front office: General manager – Bart Andrus; Head coaches: Head coach – Bart Andrus; Offensive coaches: Running backs - Brock Olivo; Wide receivers - Marcel Bellefeuille; Tight ends - Glenn Smith; Offensive line - Jeff Jagodzinski | Defensive coaches: Defensive coordinator - Brad Miller; Defensive line - Brandon Maguire; Defensive Backs/Special teams coordinator - Martin Bayless; Defensive quality control - George Jackson |

== Schedule ==
=== Regular season ===
The Stars' 2022 schedule was announced on March 7. They opened the season against the New Orleans Breakers.

| Week | Date | Time (ET) | Opponent | Result | Record | TV | Recap |
|---|---|---|---|---|---|---|---|
| 1 | April 17 | 5:00 p.m. | at New Orleans Breakers | **L** 17–23 | 0–1 | USA | Recap |
| 2 | April 23 | 12:00 p.m. | vs. **Pittsburgh Maulers** | **W** 30–23 | 1–1 | Fox | Recap |
| 3 | May 1 | 8:00 p.m. | vs. **New Jersey Generals** | **L** 16–24 | 1–2 | Peacock | Recap |
| 4 | May 6 | 10:20 p.m. | at **Michigan Panthers** | **W** 26–25 | 2–2 | FS1 | Recap |
| 5 | May 15 | 12:00 p.m. | vs. Birmingham Stallions | **L** 17–30 | 2–3 | NBC/Peacock | Recap |
| 6 | May 21 | 1:00 p.m. | vs. Tampa Bay Bandits | **W** 35–28 | 3–3 | NBC/Peacock | Recap |
| 7 | May 29 | 6:00 p.m. | at Houston Gamblers | **W** 35–24 | 4–3 | Peacock | Recap |
| 8 | June 5 | 12:00 p.m. | vs. **Michigan Panthers** | **W** 46–24 | 5–3 | Fox | Recap |
| 9 | June 12 | 7:30 p.m. | at **Pittsburgh Maulers** | **W** 17–16 | 6–3 | FS1 | Recap |
| 10 | June 18 | 12:00 p.m. | at **New Jersey Generals** | **L** 23–26 | 6–4 | USA | Recap |

Note: Intra-division opponents are in bold text.

All games held at Protective Stadium, with the exceptions of the Week 8 and Week 10 games (Both held at Legion Field)

=== Game summaries ===
==== Week 1: at New Orleans Breakers ====
Week 1: Philadelphia Stars at New Orleans Breakers – Game summary

| Quarter | 1 | 2 | 3 | 4 | Total |
|---|---|---|---|---|---|
| Stars | 0 | 7 | 10 | 0 | **17** |
| Breakers | 7 | 2 | 8 | 6 | **23** |

at Protective Stadium, Birmingham, Alabama

- Date: April 17
- Game time: 5:00 p.m. (delayed)
- Referee: Larry Smith
- TV announcers (USA): Paul Burmeister, Michael Robinson, Lewis Johnson

Game information

**First quarter**

- NO – Vontae Diggs 37-yard interception return (Austin MacGinnis kick), 5:36. New Orleans 7–0.

**Second quarter**

- NO – Chad Williams blocked punt out of endzone, safety, 8:54. New Orleans 9–0.
- PHI – Bug Howard 10-yard pass from Bryan Scott (Matt Mengal kick), 0:52. New Orleans 9–7. **Drive: 11 plays, 79 yards, 4:03.**

**Third quarter**

- PHI – Matt Mengal kick 38-yard field goal, 11:57. Philadelphia 10–9. **Drive: 4 plays, -4 yards, 1:55.**
- NO – T. J. Logan 12-yard rush (Kyle Sloter pass), 5:11. New Orleans 17–10. **Drive: 6 plays, 58 yards, 2:30.**
- PHI – Darnell Holland 42-yard rush (Matt Mengal kick), 4:27. Tied 17–17. **Drive: 2 plays, 50 yards, 0:47.**

**Fourth quarter**

- NO – Jordan Ellis 2-yard rush (Austin MacGinnis kick no good), 15:00. New Orleans 23–17. **Drive: 9 plays, 63 yards, 4:20.**

**Top passers**

- NO – Kyle Sloter – 17/27, 150 yards, INT
- PHI – Bryan Scott – 25/36, 202 yards, TD, INT

**Top rushers**

- NO – Jordan Ellis – 18 rushes, 89 yards, TD
- PHI – Darnell Holland – 9 rushes, 52 yards, TD

**Top receivers**

- NO – Sal Cannella – 6 receptions, 58 yards
- PHI – Chris Rowland – 7 receptions, 74 yards

The Stars started their season against the New Orleans Breakers. They had a chance to go up 3-0 on their first drive, but Matt Mengal missed a 45 yard field goal. On their second drive, a Bryan Scott pass was intercepted by Vontae Diggs and returned for a touchdown, putting the Stars down 0-7. In the second quarter, the Breakers blocked a punt in the endzone for a safety, putting the Stars down 0-9. In the waning minutes of the second quarter, the Stars drove 94 yards downfield, aided by 20 penalty yards, and scored, putting them at a 7-9 deficit. In the third quarter, a Breakers pass was intercepted by Channing Stribling, which set the Stars up at the Breakers 20 yard line. However, they could not capitalize, losing a yard and settling for a 38 yard field goal to take the lead 10-9. Halfway into the third, the Breakers took the lead again with a 58 yard touchdown drive and a 2 point conversion, putting the Stars down 10-17. The Stars responded in the fourth with a 2 play 50 yard drive which included a Darnell Holland 42 yard rush, to tie it up 17-17. The Breakers responded on their next drive with a 9 play 63 yard drive, putting the Stars down 17-23, which would be the final score as both teams traded possessions for the rest of the fourth.

==== Week 2: vs. Pittsburgh Maulers ====
Week 2: Pittsburgh Maulers at Philadelphia Stars – Game summary

| Quarter | 1 | 2 | 3 | 4 | Total |
|---|---|---|---|---|---|
| Maulers | 3 | 13 | 7 | 0 | **23** |
| **Stars** | 0 | 21 | 0 | 9 | **30** |

at Protective Stadium, Birmingham, Alabama

- Date: April 23
- Game time: 12:00 p.m.
- Referee: Alex Moore
- TV announcers (Fox): Curt Menefee, Joel Klatt, Brock Huard

Game information

**First quarter**

- PIT – Ramiz Ahmed 25-yard field goal, 3:44. Maulers 3–0 **12 plays, 44 yards, 5:31.**

**Second quarter**

- PHI – Diondre Overton 3-yard pass from Bryan Scott (Matt Mengal kick good), 13:48. Stars 7–3 **9 plays, 75 yards, 5:00.**
- PHI – Bryan Scott 1-yard rush (Matt Mengal kick good), 12:05. Stars 14–3 **6 plays, 21 yards, 1:27.**
- PIT – Jaylon McClain-Sapp 80-yard fumble recovery (Ramiz Ahmed kick good), 9:19. Stars 14–10
- PIT – Hunter Thedford 5-yard pass from Josh Love (Ramiz Ahmed kick no good), 3:29. Maulers 16–14 **8 plays, 76 yards, 3:44.**
- PHI – Maurice Alexander 20-yard pass from Bryan Scott (Matt Mengal kick good), 1:20. Stars 21–16 **5 plays, 65 yards, 2:11.**

**Third quarter**

- PIT – Bailey Gaither 37-yard pass from Josh Love (Ramiz Ahmed kick good), 2:51. Maulers 23–21 **11 plays, 85 yards, 5:48.**

**Fourth quarter**

- PHI – Maurice Alexander 10-yard pass from Bryan Scott (Bryan Scott pass good (3 points)), 8:57. Stars 30–23 **6 plays, 61 yards, 5:48.**

**Top passers**

- PHI – Bryan Scott – 26/36, 272 yards, 3 TD, INT
- PIT – Josh Love – 21/39, 236 yards, 2 TD, 2 INT

**Top rushers**

- PHI – Paul Terry – 8 rushes, 33 yards
- PIT – Garrett Groshek – 18 rushes, 77 yards

**Top receivers**

- PHI – Maurice Alexander – 8 receptions, 87 yards, 2 TD
- PIT – Bailey Gaither – 7 receptions, 117 yards, TD

The Stars played against division rival Pittsburgh Maulers. In their first two drives, they committed two turnovers; a Bryan Scott interception and a Darnell Holland fumble. The Maulers struck first on a 25 yard field goal on the back of a fumble by the Stars to put the Stars down 0-3. The Stars responded by driving 75 yards for a touchdown to put the Stars up 7-3. On the first play of the ensuing drive, Maulers quarterback Josh Love threw an interception to Ahmad Dixon, putting the Stars at the Maulers 21. The Stars capitalized, driving for another touchdown, putting them up 14-3. During their next drive, Maulers cornerback Jaylon McClain-Sapp strip-sacked Scott, returning it 80 yards for the touchdown, putting the Stars at 14-10. The Maulers scored another touchdown on their next drive, putting the Stars down 14-16. The Stars responded with a touchdown drive capped off by a 20-yard pass, putting the Stars up 21-16.

It just takes time to knock some rust off a little bit — for all of them. I mean for us, defensively and offensively, the offensive lineman, getting used to game speed. It's so different from practice speed.

— Stars head coach, Bart Andrus, April 23, 2022, Fox Sports

In the second half, the only points came off a Maulers touchdown to put the Stars down 21-23. The fourth quarter saw the Stars drive 61 yards for a touchdown, and convert the first 3-point attempt in the USFL to put the Stars up 30-23, which would be the final score.

==== Week 3: vs. New Jersey Generals ====
Week 3: New Jersey Generals at Philadelphia Stars – Game summary

| Quarter | 1 | 2 | 3 | 4 | Total |
|---|---|---|---|---|---|
| Generals | 0 | 3 | 7 | 14 | **24** |
| Stars | 7 | 3 | 6 | 0 | **16** |

at Protective Stadium, Birmingham, Alabama

- Date: May 1
- Game time: 8:00 p.m.
- Referee: James Carter
- TV announcers (Peacock): Paul Burmeister, Michael Robinson, Corey Robinson

The Stars took on division rival New Jersey Generals in a game in which the winner would gain 1st in the North Division. With 11:23 left in the 1st quarter, Stars quarterback Bryan Scott completed a 41-yard touchdown pass to tight end Bug Howard. On the final drive of the first quarter. In the 2nd quarter, the Stars drove into the red zone, but only came away with 3 points on a Matt Mengel 22-yard field goal, extending their lead to 10-0. The Generals would drive the game to a 1 possession game before half, connecting on a 54-yard field goal by kicker Nick Rose. The Stars would lead 10-3 at halftime.

On the first drive of the second half, the Generals would tie the game at 10 on a 4-yard Darius Victor rushing touchdown. But on the next drive, the Stars would take the lead on a 6-yard pass from quarterback Case Cookus to wide receiver Diondre Overton. The 4th quarter would be all New Jersey, as they would get 14 unanswered points. A 1-yard Darius Victor run, and a 4-yard De'Andre Johnson run. The loss put the Stars at 2nd in the North Division.

== Standings ==
North Division
| # | | W | L | PCT | GB | DIV | PF | PA | STK |
|---|---|---|---|---|---|---|---|---|---|
| 1 | (y) New Jersey Generals | 9 | 1 | .900 | – | 6–0 | 232 | 182 | W9 |
| 2 | (x) Philadelphia Stars | 6 | 4 | .600 | 3 | 4–2 | 262 | 243 | L1 |
| 3 | (e) Michigan Panthers | 2 | 8 | .200 | 7 | 2–4 | 211 | 236 | W1 |
| 4 | (e) Pittsburgh Maulers | 1 | 9 | .100 | 8 | 0–6 | 147 | 243 | L5 |
(x)–clinched playoff berth; (y)–clinched division; (e)–eliminated from playoff contention

=== Postseason ===
| Round | Date | Time (ET) | Opponent | Result | Record | TV | Recap |
|---|---|---|---|---|---|---|---|
| Division Finals | June 25 | 3:00 p.m. | at New Jersey Generals | W 19–14 | 1–0 | Fox | Recap |
| USFL Championship | July 3 | 7:30 p.m. | vs. Birmingham Stallions | L 30–33 | 1–1 | Fox | Recap |
