= 2022 Pittsburgh Maulers season =

American professional football season

- General manager: Chris Watts
- Head coach: Kirby Wilson
- Home stadium: None

Results
- Record: 1–9
- League place: 4th in North Division
- Playoffs: Did not qualify

The 2022 Pittsburgh Maulers season was the first season for the Pittsburgh Maulers as a professional American football franchise, as well as the only one under head coach Kirby Wilson. They played as charter members of the United States Football League, one of eight teams to compete in the league for the 2022 season. The Maulers technically played as a traveling team (since the entirety of the regular season was played at Protective Stadium and Legion Field in Birmingham, Alabama).

The Maulers began their season with a 0–4 record, the worst start in the league, and would pick up their only win of the season against the Houston Gamblers in Week 5. Finishing with a record of 1–9, the worst record in the league, the team did not win the rights to the first overall pick in the 2023 USFL draft, after the league decided that the winner of the Week 10 game between the 1–8 Maulers and 1–8 Michigan Panthers, would win the first overall pick. The Panthers were victorious 21–33.

== Final roster ==
2022 Pittsburgh Maulers roster
Quarterbacks (QB): 12 Vad Lee; 14 Roland Rivers III; Running backs (RB): 38 Mikey Daniel; 33 James Gilbert; 9 Madre London; Wide receivers (WR): 4 Bailey Gaither; 7 Delvon Hardaway; 10 Isiah Hennie; 13 Jalen McCleskey; 89 Tre Walker; Tight ends (TE): 1 Artayvious Lynn; 80 Matt Seybert	Offensive linemen (OL): 78 Vadal Alexander G; 62 Abdul Beecham G/T; 52 Xavier Dampeer G/C; 51 Justin Evans T; 74 Nico Falah C; 68 Chidi Okeke T; 58 Brayden Patton C; Defensive linemen (DL): 56 Eric Assoua DE; 99 Carlo Kemp DE; 59 Chris Okoye DT; 92 Jeremiah Pharms Jr. DT; 95 Nasir Player DE; 91 Boogie Roberts DT; 94 Olive Sagapolu DT	Linebackers (LB): 50 Blaze Alldredge; 6 Malcolm Howard; 31 Kyahva Tezino; 55 Zane Zandier; Defensive backs (DB): 2 Terrell Bonds CB; 25 Shakur Brown CB; 20 Malcolm Elmore S; 11 Keith Gipson Jr. CB; 22 Bryce Torneden S; 8 Eli Walker S; Special teams (ST): 16 Ramiz Ahmed K; 18 Max Duffy P; 48 Mitchell Fraboni LS	Practice squad: 72 Charles Baldwin T; 69 Jerrod Brooks T; 67 Jon Dietzen G; 37 Garrett Groshek RB; 17 Devin Hafford CB; 23 Prince Charles Iworah CB; 98 Will Miles DT; 97 Leevel Tatum III DE; 85 Hunter Thedford TE; 45 Dale Warren LB; Reserve: -- Isaiah Battle T (DNR); 97 Terry Beckner DT (IR); -- Winston Dimel FB Retired; 44 E. J. Ejiya LB (IR); 24 Jaylon McClain-Sapp CB (IR); 21 Arnold Tarpley III S (IR); Rookies in italics 39 active, 5 reserve, 10 practice squad

== Staff ==
2022 Pittsburgh Maulers staff
Front office: General manager – Chris Watts; Head coaches: Head coach – Kirby Wilson; Offensive coaches: Offensive coordinator/quarterbacks – John Tomlinson; Running backs – Will Johnson; Tight ends – Bill Khayat; Offensive line – Steve Loney	Defensive coaches: Defensive coordinator – Jarren Horton; Defensive line – Rick Courtright; Linebackers coach/Special teams coordinator – Marc Hull; Defensive backs – Jack Nudo

== Schedule ==
=== Regular season ===
The Maulers' 2022 schedule was announced on March 7. They opened the season against the Tampa Bay Bandits.

Week	Date	Time (ET)	Opponent	Result	Record	TV	Recap
1	April 18	7:00 p.m.	Tampa Bay Bandits*	**L** 3–17	0–1	FS1	Recap
2	April 23	12:00 p.m.	**Philadelphia Stars**	**L** 23–30	0–2	Fox	Recap
3	May 1	2:30 p.m.	**Michigan Panthers**	**L** 0–24	0–3	USA	Recap
4	May 7	2:30 p.m.	**New Jersey Generals***	**L** 13–21	0–4	Peacock	Recap
5	May 15	4:00 p.m.	Houston Gamblers	**W** 21–20	1–4	Fox	Recap
6	May 22	12:00 p.m.	New Orleans Breakers	**L** 16–26	1–5	FS1	Recap
7	May 29	2:00 p.m.	Birmingham Stallions*	**L** 16–26	1–6	Fox	Recap
8	June 3	8:00 p.m.	**New Jersey Generals**	**L** 18–29	1–7	USA	Recap
9	June 12	7:30 p.m.	**Philadelphia Stars***	**L** 16–17	1–8	FS1	Recap
10	June 19	12:00 p.m.	**Michigan Panthers***	**L** 21–33	1–9	USA	Recap

Note: Intra-division opponents are in bold text. * mean that they hosted the game, since all eight teams played at the same stadium

=== Game summaries ===
==== Week 1: vs. Tampa Bay Bandits ====
Week 1: Tampa Bay Bandits at Pittsburgh Maulers – Game summary

Quarter	1	2	3	4	Total
**Bandits**	10	7	0	0	**17**
Maulers	0	0	3	0	**3**

at Protective Stadium, Birmingham, Alabama

- Date: April 18 (delayed)
- Game time: 7:00 p.m. EST
- Referee: Bryan Banks
- TV announcers (FS1): Curt Menefee, Joel Klatt, Brock Huard
- Recap

Game information

**First quarter**

- TB – B. J. Emmons 3-yard run (Tyler Rausa kick), 10:49. Bandits 7–0. **Drive: 8 plays, 68 yards, 4:11.**
- TB – Tyler Rausa 23-yard field goal, 1:06. Bandits 10–0. **Drive: 10 plays, 54 yards, 4:50.**

**Second quarter**

- TB – Jordan Lasley 3-yard pass from Jordan Ta'amu (Tyler Rausa kick), 1:17. Bandits 17–0. **Drive: 8 plays, 38 yards, 3;28.**

**Third quarter**

- PIT – Ramiz Ahmed 28-yard field goal, 4:25. Bandits 17–3. **Drive: 10 plays, 46 yards, 4:55.**

**Fourth quarter**

- No scoring plays

**Top passers**

- TB – Jordan Ta'amu – 20/32, 185 yards, TD, 2 INT
- PIT – Josh Love – 9/16, 121 yards

**Top rushers**

- TB – B. J. Emmons – 19 rushes, 40 yards, TD
- PIT – Garrett Groshek – 16 rushes, 55 yards

**Top receivers**

- TB – Cheyenne O'Grady – 8 receptions, 86 yards
- PIT – Jeff Thomas – 4 receptions, 43 yards

The Maulers started their season against the Tampa Bay Bandits. The Maulers regressed in the first half, allowing 17 unanswered points with 2 touchdowns and a field goal. On the Bandits first drive of the game, they drove downfield 68 yards to score. The teams would trade punts until what would be the Bandits last drive of the first quarter saw them drive 54 yards down field and kick a field goal to put the Maulers down 0–10 at the end of the first. The teams traded punts again until near the end of the second quarter when a short punt by the Maulers put them at the Pittsburgh's 38 yard line. The drive ended when Jordan Ta'amu threw a 3-yard touchdown pass to Jordan Lasley to put the Maulers down 0-17 heading into the half, which would be the only points Tampa would score. The second half saw the Maulers drive 46 yards to hit a 28-yard field goal to put the Maulers down 3–17, which would be the final score.

==== Week 2: at Philadelphia Stars ====
Week 2: Pittsburgh Maulers at Philadelphia Stars – Game summary

Quarter	1	2	3	4	Total
Maulers	3	13	7	0	**23**
**Stars**	0	21	0	9	**30**

at Protective Stadium, Birmingham, Alabama

- Date: April 23
- Game time: 12:00 p.m. EST
- Referee: Alex Moore
- TV announcers (Fox): Curt Menefee, Joel Klatt, Brock Huard
- Recap

Game information

**First quarter**

- PIT – Ramiz Ahmed 25-yard field goal, 3:44. Maulers 3–0 **12 plays, 44 yards, 5:31.**

**Second quarter**

- PHI – Diondre Overton 3-yard pass from Bryan Scott (Matt Mengal kick), 13:41. Stars 7–3 **9 plays, 75 yards, 5:00.**
- PHI – Bryan Scott 1-yard run (Matt Mengal kick), 12:05. Stars 14–3 **6 plays, 21 yards, 1:27.**
- PIT – Jaylon McClain-Sapp 80-yard fumble recovery (Ramiz Ahmed kick), 9:01. Stars 14–10
- PIT – Hunter Thedford 5-yard pass from Josh Love (Ramiz Ahmed kick failed), 3:25. Maulers 16–14 **8 plays, 76 yards, 3:44.**
- PHI – Maurice Alexander 20-yard pass from Bryan Scott (Matt Mengal kick), 1:14. Stars 21–16 **5 plays, 65 yards, 2:11.**

**Third quarter**

- PIT – Bailey Gaither 37-yard pass from Josh Love (Ramiz Ahmed kick), 2:43. Maulers 23–21 **11 plays, 85 yards, 5:48.**

**Fourth quarter**

- PHI – Maurice Alexander 10-yard pass from Bryan Scott (Paul Terry pass from Bryan Scott (3 points)), 8:51. Stars 30–23 **6 plays, 61 yards, 5:48.**

**Top passers**

- PIT – Josh Love – 21/39, 236 yards, 2 TD, 2 INT
- PHI – Bryan Scott – 26/36, 272 yards, 3 TD, INT

**Top rushers**

- PIT – Garrett Groshek – 18 rushes, 77 yards
- PHI – Paul Terry – 8 rushes, 33 yards

**Top receivers**

- PIT – Bailey Gaither – 7 receptions, 117 yards, TD
- PHI – Maurice Alexander – 8 receptions, 87 yards, 2 TD

The Maulers played against division rival Philadelphia Stars. The Maulers struck first on a 25-yard field goal on the back of a fumble by the Stars to go up 3–0. The Stars responded by driving 75 yards for a touchdown to put the Maulers down 3–7. On the first play of the ensuing drive, Josh Love threw an interception to Ahmad Dixon, putting the Stars at the Maulers 21. The Stars capitalized, driving for another touchdown, putting the Maulers down 3–14. During their next drive, Maulers cornerback Jaylon McClain-Sapp strip-sacked Bryan Scott, returning it 80 yards for the touchdown, putting the Maulers up 10–14. The Maulers scored again on their next drive, driving 71 yards to take the lead 16–14. The Stars responded with a touchdown drive capped off by a 20-yard pass, putting the Maulers down 16–21.

It just takes time to knock some rust off a little bit — for all of them. I mean for us, defensively and offensively, the offensive lineman, getting used to game speed. It's so different from practice speed.

— Stars head coach, Bart Andrus, April 23, 2022, Fox Sports

In the second half, the only points came off a Maulers touchdown to put the Maulers up 23–21. The fourth quarter saw the Stars drive 61 yards for a touchdown, and convert the first 3-point attempt in the USFL to put the Maulers down 23–30, which would be the final score.

==== Week 3: at Michigan Panthers ====
Week 3: Pittsburgh Maulers at Michigan Panthers – Game summary

Quarter	1	2	3	4	Total
Maulers	0	0	0	0	**0**
**Panthers**	16	0	0	8	**24**

at Protective Stadium, Birmingham, Alabama

- Date: May 1
- Game time: 2:30 p.m. EST
- Referee: Larry Smith
- TV announcers (USA): Jac Collinsworth, Jason Garrett, Corey Robinson
- Recap

Game information

**First quarter**

- MICH – Stevie Scott 6-yard run (Paxton Lynch run), 11:36. Panthers 8–0. **Drive: 9 plays, 63 yards, 3:24.**
- MICH – Paxton Lynch 1-yard run (Cameron Scarlett run), 5:29. Panthers 16–0. **Drive: 3 plays, 5 yards, 0:59.**

**Second quarter**

- No scoring plays

**Third quarter**

- No scoring plays

**Fourth quarter**

- MICH – Reggie Corbin 4-yard run (Shea Patterson run), 4:08. Panthers 24–0. **Drive: 12 plays, 63 yards, 6:42.**

**Top passers**

- PIT – Josh Love – 10/19, 83 yards
- MICH – Shea Patterson – 8/17, 48 yards

**Top rushers**

- PIT – Madre London – 11 rushes, 68 yards
- MICH – Reggie Corbin – 20 rushes, 133 yards, TD

**Top receivers**

- PIT – Tre Walker – 5 receptions, 58 yards
- MICH – Lance Lenoir – 4 receptions, 40 yards

In their third game, the Maulers played against their division rival Michigan Panthers.

On their opening drive, the Panthers took an 8–0 lead following a 6-yard touchdown rush by Stevie Scott and a 2-yard 2-point conversion rush by Paxton Lynch.

The Panthers went three-and-out on their next offensive drive, but Maulers returner Jeff Thomas muffed the ensuing punt, and three plays later, Lynch rushed for a 1-yard Panthers touchdown. Cameron Scarlett rushed 2 yards for the 2-point conversion to make the score 16–0.

The Maulers missed 3 field goals and turned the ball over on downs twice before the Panthers scored a fourth quarter touchdown on a 4-yard Reggie Corbin rush. Shea Patterson scored on a 2-yard 2-point conversion rush to make the final score 24–0.

==== Week 4: vs. New Jersey Generals ====
Week 4: New Jersey Generals at Pittsburgh Maulers – Game summary

Quarter	1	2	3	4	Total
**Generals**	7	7	7	0	**21**
Maulers	0	10	0	3	**13**

at Protective Stadium, Birmingham, Alabama

- Date: May 7
- Game time: 2:30 p.m. EST
- Referee: Duane Heydt
- TV announcers (Peacock): Paul Burmeister, Michael Robinson, Corey Robinson
- Recap

Game information

**First quarter**

- NJ – Alonzo Moore 62-yard pass from De'Andre Johnson (Nick Rose kick), 3:01. Generals 7–0. **Drive: 2 plays, 62 yards, 0:40.**

**Second quarter**

- PIT – Ramiz Ahmed 47-yard field goal, 12:40. Generals 7–3. **Drive: 7 plays, 16 yards, 2:11.**
- NJ – KaVontae Turpin 7-yard run (Nick Rose kick), 2:24. Generals 14–3. **Drive: 15 plays, 75 yards, 10:11.**
- PIT – Garrett Groshek 1-yard run (Ramiz Ahmed kick), 0:20. Generals 14–10. **Drive: 10 plays, 72 yards, 2:04.**

**Third quarter**

- NJ – Darius Victor 3-yard run (Nick Rose kick), 10:40. Generals 21–10. **Drive: 7 plays, 34 yards, 4:20.**

**Fourth quarter**

- PIT – Ramiz Ahmed 39-yard field goal, 9:46. Generals 21–13. **Drive: 6 plays, 43 yards, 1:54.**

**Top passers**

- NJ – Luis Perez – 11/14, 102 yards
- PIT – Kyle Lauletta – 15/32, 169 yards

**Top rushers**

- NJ – Darius Victor – 10 rushes, 57 yards, TD
- PIT – Madre London – 5 rushes, 43 yards

**Top receivers**

- NJ – Alonzo Moore – 3 receptions, 104 yards, TD
- PIT – Tre Walker – 9 receptions, 110 yards

In their fourth game, the Maulers played against their division rival New Jersey Generals.

On their second drive, the Generals took a 7–0 lead following a 62-yard touchdown pass from De'Andre Johnson to Alonzo Moore.

The Maulers responded in the second quarter with a 47-yard field goal by Ramiz Ahmed to make the score 7–3. The teams then traded short rushing TDs to make the score 14–10 at halftime.

In the third quarter, the Generals scored on their opening drive, extending their lead to 21–10.

The Maulers added another three points on a fourth quarter 39-yard Ahmed field goal, drawing to 21–13. However, they could not score further, losing the game by that score.

==== Week 5: at Houston Gamblers ====
Week 5: Pittsburgh Maulers at Houston Gamblers – Game summary

Quarter	1	2	3	4	Total
**Maulers**	0	6	3	12	**21**
Gamblers	7	3	7	3	**20**

at Protective Stadium, Birmingham, Alabama

- Date: May 15
- Game time: 4:00 p.m. EST
- Referee: Alex Moore
- TV announcers (Fox): Curt Menefee, Joel Klatt, Brock Huard
- Recap

Game information

**First quarter**

- HOU – Isaiah Zuber 24-yard pass from Clayton Thorson (Nick Vogel kick), 7:41. Gamblers 7–0. **Drive: 4 plays, 72 yards, 2:04.**

**Second quarter**

- HOU – Nick Vogel 45-yard field goal, 14:22. Gamblers 10–0. **Drive: 10 plays, 36 yards, 5:47.**
- PIT – Ramiz Ahmed 51-yard field goal, 10:10. Gamblers 10–3. **Drive: 8 plays, 41 yards, 4:13.**
- PIT – Ramiz Ahmed 22-yard field goal, 2:00. Gamblers 10–6. **Drive: 13 plays, 55 yards, 6:00.**

**Third quarter**

- HOU – Clayton Thorson 1-yard run (Nick Vogel kick), 7:36. Gamblers 17–6. **Drive: 12 plays, 53 yards, 7:24.**
- PIT – Ramiz Ahmed 24-yard field goal, 2:51. Gamblers 17–9. **Drive: 9 plays, 44 yards, 4:49.**

**Fourth quarter**

- PIT – Bailey Gaither 30-yard pass from Vad Lee (Madre London run failed), 6:19. Gamblers 17–15. **Drive: 2 plays, 26 yards, 0:42.**
- HOU – Nick Vogel 44-yard field goal, 3:39. Gamblers 20–15. **Drive: 7 plays, 49 yards, 2:45.**
- PIT – Bailey Gaither 9-yard pass from Vad Lee (Max Duffy run failed), 0:00. Maulers 21–20. **Drive: 15 plays, 71 yards, 3:34.**

**Top passers**

- PIT – Vad Lee – 19/32, 170 yards, 2 TD, INT
- HOU – Clayton Thorson – 11/24, 165 yards, TD, INT

**Top rushers**

- PIT – Garrett Groshek – 7 rushes, 23 yards
- HOU – Mark Thompson – 17 rushes, 80 yards

**Top receivers**

- PIT – Bailey Gaither – 8 receptions, 108 yards, 2 TD
- HOU – Isaiah Zuber – 3 receptions, 72 yards, TD

In their fifth game, the Maulers played against the Houston Gamblers.

On their opening drive, the Gamblers took a 7–0 lead following a 24-yard touchdown pass from Clayton Thorson to Isaiah Zuber for the only points of the first quarter. The Gamblers added a field goal to begin the second quarter, going up 10–0.

The Maulers responded in the second quarter with two field goals by Ramiz Ahmed to make the score 10–6 at half.

In the third quarter, the Gamblers scored on their opening drive, extending their lead to 17–6. Ahmed kicked another field goal to make the score 17-9 entering the fourth quarter.

In the fourth quarter, the Maulers scored on a Vad Lee passing touchdown to Bailey Gaither, making the score 17–15, as they were unable to score a two-point conversion. The Generals kicked a field goal to make the score 20–15 with 3:39 left to play. Lee and Gaither would connect again with no time left on the clock to secure the Maulers' first win, by the final score of 21–20.

==== Week 6: at New Orleans Breakers ====
Week 6: Pittsburgh Maulers at New Orleans Breakers – Game summary

Quarter	1	2	3	4	Total
Maulers	0	0	3	13	**16**
**Breakers**	7	3	7	9	**26**

at Protective Stadium, Birmingham, Alabama

- Date: May 22
- Game time: 12:00 p.m. EST
- Referee: Larry Smith
- TV announcers (FS1): Kevin Kugler, Joel Klatt, Devin Gardner
- Recap

Game information

**First quarter**

- NO – Anthony Jones 1-yard run (Taylor Bertolet kick), 1:35. Breakers 7–0. **Drive: 18 plays, 94 yards, 9:21.**

**Second quarter**

- NO – Taylor Bertolet 22-yard field goal, 0:05. Breakers 10–0. **Drive: 9 plays, 51 yards, 1:07.**

**Third quarter**

- PIT – Ramiz Ahmed 37-yard field goal, 6:45. Breakers 10–3. **Drive: 13 plays, 57 yards, 7:44.**
- NO – Jordan Ellis 5-yard run (Taylor Bertolet kick), 1:30. Breakers 17–3. **Drive: 10 plays, 50 yards, 5:12.**

**Fourth quarter**

- NO – Ike Brown 97-yard interception return (Taylor Bertolet kick failed), 10:47. Breakers 23–3.
- PIT – Bailey Gaither 22-yard pass from Vad Lee (Ramiz Ahmed kick failed), 9:47. Breakers 23–9. **Drive: 6 plays, 45 yards, 1:00.**
- PIT – Vad Lee 4-yard run (Ramiz Ahmed kick), 5:08. Breakers 23–16. **Drive: 10 plays, 58 yards, 3:04.**
- NO – Taylor Bertolet 38-yard field goal, 0:40. Breakers 26–16. **Drive: 10 plays, 55 yards, 4:33.**

**Top passers**

- PIT – Vad Lee – 17/34, 198 yards, TD, 2 INT
- NO – Kyle Sloter – 13/21, 92 yards

**Top rushers**

- PIT – Madre London – 10 rushes, 50 yards
- NO – Anthony Jones – 22 rushes, 102 yards, TD

**Top receivers**

- PIT – Isiah Hennie – 4 receptions, 71 yards
- NO – Taywan Taylor – 5 receptions, 40 yards

The Maulers played the New Orleans Breakers in their sixth game.

After the teams punted on their first offensive drives, the Breakers began the scoring on their second drive with an Anthony Jones rushing TD. Neither team would score again in the first half until the Breakers' Taylor Bertolet added a field goal to close the second quarter, making it 10–0 at halftime.

The Maulers finally got on the board with a Ramiz Ahmed field goal in the third quarter. The Breakers responded with a Jordan Ellis rushing TD to enter the fourth quarter ahead 17–3.

The Maulers were threatening to pull within a TD when Vad Lee was intercepted by Ike Brown a second time, and Brown returned the INT for a 97-yard TD. The Maulers responded with two fourth quarter TDs to make the score 23–16, but the Breakers ended the Maulers' comeback hopes with another Bertolet field goal with less than a minute left, making the final score 26–16.

==== Week 7: vs. Birmingham Stallions ====
Week 7: Birmingham Stallions at Pittsburgh Maulers – Game summary

Quarter	1	2	3	4	Total
**Stallions**	3	3	10	10	**26**
Maulers	7	3	3	3	**16**

at Protective Stadium, Birmingham, Alabama

- Date: May 29
- Game time: 2:00 p.m. EST
- Referee: Duane Heydt
- TV announcers (Fox): Kevin Kugler, Joel Klatt, Devin Gardner
- Recap

Game information

**First quarter**

- BIR – Brandon Aubrey 27-yard field goal, 8:16. Stallions 3–0. **9 plays, 69 yards, 5:01.**
- PIT – Madre London 4-yard run (Ramiz Ahmed kick), 3:03. Maulers 7–3. **10 plays, 71 yards, 5:09.**

**Second quarter**

- PIT – Ramiz Ahmed 43-yard field goal, 8:25. Maulers 10–3. **6 plays, 27 yards, 2:31.**
- BIR – Brandon Aubrey 36-yard field goal, 2:08. Maulers 10–6. **13 plays, 51 yards, 6:17.**

**Third quarter**

- BIR – Bobby Holly 52-yard run (Brandon Aubrey kick), 12:27. Stallions 13–10. **5 plays, 75 yards, 2:33.**
- PIT – Ramiz Ahmed 43-yard field goal, 4:14. Tied 13–13. **4 plays, -3 yards, 1:52.**
- BIR – Brandon Aubrey 43-yard field goal, 0:44. Stallions 16–13. **7 plays, 29 yards, 3:30.**

**Fourth quarter**

- BIR – C. J. Marable 5-yard run (Brandon Aubrey kick), 8:33. Stallions 23–13. **11 plays, 79 yards, 5:30.**
- PIT – Ramiz Ahmed 58-yard field goal, 6:49. Stallions 23–16. **6 plays, 22 yards, 1:49.**
- BIR – Brandon Aubrey 45-yard field goal, 2:00. Stallions 26–16. **4 plays, 1 yard, 1:17.**

**Top passers**

- BIR – J'Mar Smith – 9/24, 138 yards, INT
- PIT – Vad Lee – 6/14, 58 yards

**Top rushers**

- BIR – Bo Scarbrough – 27 rushes, 100 yards
- PIT – Madre London – 18 rushes, 99 yards, TD

**Top receivers**

- BIR – Victor Bolden Jr. – 1 reception, 53 yards
- PIT – Mikey Daniel – 2 receptions, 21 yards

The Maulers played the undefeated hometown Birmingham Stallions in their seventh game.

The Stallions began the scoring on their opening drive with a Brandon Aubrey 27-yard field goal. The Maulers would take the lead before the end of the quarter after a Madre London rushing TD to make the score 7–3.

In the second quarter, the teams traded field goals, with the Maulers extending their lead to 10-3 and the Stallions then pulling back within 4 to make the score 10–6 at half.

The Stallions took the lead on their opening second quarter drive, scoring on a 52-yard Bobby Holly rush to make the score 13–10. The Maulers then kicked a field goal to pull even, but the Stallions added a field goal of their own to take a 16–13 lead into the fourth quarter.

The Stallions again scored on their first possession of the fourth quarter, extending their lead to 23–13. The Maulers then converted on a 58-yard field goal to pull within a touchdown, 23–16. The Stallions added one final field goal at the two-minute warning to give the Maulers their second straight 26–16 defeat.

==== Week 8: at New Jersey Generals ====
Week 8: Pittsburgh Maulers at New Jersey Generals – Game summary

Quarter	1	2	3	4	Total
Maulers	7	0	3	8	**18**
**Generals**	7	16	0	6	**29**

at Legion Field, Birmingham, Alabama

- Date: June 3
- Game time: 8:00 p.m. EST
- Referee: Bryan Banks
- TV announcers (USA): Paul Burmeister, Jason Garrett, Zora Stephenson
- Recap

Game information

**First quarter**

- NJ – Darius Victor 2-yard run (Austin Jones kick), 12:38. Generals 7–0. **5 plays, 46 yards, 2:22.**
- PIT – Roland Rivers 5-yard run (Ramiz Ahmed kick), 7:26. Tied 7–7. **9 plays, 50 yards, 5:12.**

**Second quarter**

- NJ – Darius Victor 7-yard run (Austin Jones kick), 12:56. Generals 14–7. **8 plays, 59 yards, 4:27.**
- NJ – KaVontae Turpin 24-yard pass from Luis Perez (Austin Jones kick failed), 5:46. Generals 20–7. **8 plays, 89 yards, 4:25.**
- NJ – Austin Jones 50-yard field goal, 0:00. Generals 23–7. **10 plays, 68 yards, 2:54.**

**Third quarter**

- PIT – Ramiz Ahmed 61-yard field goal, 4:06. Generals 23–10. **7 plays, 29 yards, 3:59.**

**Fourth quarter**

- NJ – Darius Victor 1-yard run (Luis Perez pass failed), 12:56. Generals 29–10. **10 plays, 67 yards, 6:05.**
- PIT – Isiah Hennie 25-yard pass from Roland Rivers (Hunter Thedford pass from Roland Rivers), 6:03. Generals 29–18. **3 plays, 32 yards, 0:52.**

**Top passers**

- PIT – Roland Rivers – 18/38, 218 yards, TD, INT
- NJ – Luis Perez – 18/24, 220 yards, TD

**Top rushers**

- PIT – Roland Rivers – 6 rushes, 28 yards, TD
- NJ – Darius Victor – 17 rushes, 187 yards, 3 TD

**Top receivers**

- PIT – Delvon Hardaway – 3 receptions, 64 yards
- NJ – KaVontae Turpin – 5 receptions, 83 yards, TD

The Maulers played their first rematch of the season as they faced division rival New Jersey in their eighth game.

The Generals and Maulers each scored on their opening drives to make the score 7–7 at the end of the first quarter.

New Jersey scored 16 unanswered points in the second quarter on two touchdowns and a field goal to make it 23–7 at half.

The lone scoring of the third quarter came when the Maulers kicked a field goal to make the score 23–10 to begin the fourth quarter.

The teams traded touchdowns in the fourth quarter, making the final score 29–18.

With the loss, the Maulers were officially eliminated from playoff contention.

==== Week 9: vs. Philadelphia Stars ====
Week 9: Philadelphia Stars at Pittsburgh Maulers – Game summary

Quarter	1	2	3	4	Total
**Stars**	3	0	7	7	**17**
Maulers	3	7	0	6	**16**

at Protective Stadium, Birmingham, Alabama

- Date: June 12
- Game time: 7:30 p.m. EST
- Referee: Larry Smith
- TV announcers (FS1): Kevin Kugler, Mark Sanchez, Joshua Perry
- Recap

Game information

**First quarter**

- PHI – Luis Aguilar 47-yard field goal, 7:06. Stars 3–0. **4 plays, -2 yards, 2:24.**
- PIT – Ramiz Ahmed 59-yard field goal, 2:21. Tied 3–3. **8 plays, 41 yards, 4:48.**

**Second quarter**

- PIT – Malcolm Howard 14-yard pass from Ramiz Ahmed (Ramiz Ahmed kick), 10:11. Maulers 10–3. **11 plays, 57 yards, 4:48.**

**Third quarter**

- PHI – Paul Terry 1-yard run (Luis Aguilar kick), 1:30. Tied 10–10. **8 plays, 55 yards, 4:55.**

**Fourth quarter**

- PIT – Tre Walker 28-yard pass from Vad Lee (Ramiz Ahmed kick missed), 11:56. Maulers 16–10. **8 plays, 52 yards, 4:34.**
- PHI – Matt Colburn 51-yard run (Luis Aguilar kick), 4:45. Stars 17–16. **1 plays, 51 yards, 0:13.**

**Top passers**

- PHI – K. J. Costello – 4/10, 69 yards
- PIT – Vad Lee – 17/28, 146 yards, TD, 2 INT

**Top rushers**

- PHI – Matt Colburn – 12 rushes, 97 yards, TD
- PIT – Garrett Groshek – 11 rushes, 48 yards

**Top receivers**

- PHI – Jordan Suell – 3 receptions, 47 yards
- PIT – Hunter Thedford – 3 receptions, 50 yards

In their next-to-last game of the season, the Maulers had a rematch with the Stars.

In the opening quarter, the teams traded field goals.

In the second quarter, the lone points were scored when Ramiz Ahmed threw a touchdown on a Maulers fake field goal to give his team the lead.

In the third quarter, the Stars scored on a short rushing TD to tie the game.

In the fourth quarter, the Maulers again took the lead on a passing TD, this time from Vad Lee to Tre Walker. However Ahmed missed the ensuing extra point to keep the lead at 6.

The final, and ultimately decisive points of the game were scored by the Stars on a 51-yard run to secure a 17–16 win.

==== Week 10: vs. Michigan Panthers ====
Week 10: Michigan Panthers at Pittsburgh Maulers – Game summary

Quarter	1	2	3	4	Total
**Panthers**	14	7	3	9	**33**
Maulers	0	3	0	18	**21**

at Legion Field, Birmingham, Alabama

- Date: June 19
- Game time: 12:00 p.m. EST
- Referee: Bryan Banks
- TV announcers (USA): Paul Burmeister, Ryan Harris, Corey Robinson
- Recap

Game information

**First quarter**

- MICH – Ishmael Hyman 4-yard pass from Paxton Lynch (Cole Murphy kick), 6:59. Panthers 7–0. **Drive: 5 plays, 17 yards, 2:16.**
- MICH – Cory Rahman 63-yard fumble return (Cole Murphy kick), 2:45. Panthers 14–0.

**Second quarter**

- MICH – Lance Lenoir 3-yard pass from Paxton Lynch (Cole Murphy kick), 11:05. Panthers 21–0. **Drive: 8 plays, 94 yards, 3:34.**
- PIT – Ramiz Ahmed 23-yard field goal, 1:25. Panthers 21–3. **Drive: 10 plays, 33 yards, 3:39.**

**Third quarter**

- MICH – Cole Murphy 23-yard field goal, 1:25. Panthers 24–3. **Drive: 10 plays, 33 yards, 3:39.**

**Fourth quarter**

- PIT – Matt Seybert 6-yard pass from Roland Rivers (Roland Rivers pass failed), 14:56. Panthers 24–9. **Drive: 5 plays, 74 yards, 2:45.**
- PIT – Isiah Hennie 13-yard pass from Vad Lee (Vad Lee pass failed), 11:04. Panthers 24–15. **Drive: 6 plays, 39 yards, 2:22.**
- MICH – Marcus Baugh 5-yard pass from Paxton Lynch (Cole Murphy kick failed), 4:47. Panthers 30–15. **Drive: 10 plays, 75 yards, 2:22.**
- PIT – Isiah Hennie 22-yard pass from Vad Lee (Vad Lee pass failed), 3:39. Panthers 30–21. **Drive: 7 plays, 75 yards, 2:38.**
- MICH – Cole Murphy 44-yard field goal, 2:18. Panthers 33–21. **Drive: 4 plays, 8 yards, 1:26.**

**Top passers**

- MICH – Paxton Lynch – 22/30, 275 yards, 3 TD, INT
- PIT – Vad Lee – 12/22, 157 yards, 2 TD, INT

**Top rushers**

- MICH – Stevie Scott – 10 rushes, 44 yards
- PIT – James Gilbert – 11 rushes, 26 yards

**Top receivers**

- MICH – Ishmael Hyman – 6 receptions, 71 yards, TD
- PIT – Delvon Hardaway – 6 receptions, 100 yards

In their final game of the season, the Maulers had a rematch against the Michigan Panthers.

The Panthers jumped out to a 21–0 lead midway through the second quarter. The Maulers finally scored a field goal to make it 21–3 at half. The lone scoring of the third quarter was a Panthers field goal to make the score 24-3 going into the fourth.

In the fourth quarter, the teams combined for 27 points, with the Maulers scoring three passing TDs and the Panthers scoring one passing TD and one field goal. Ultimately, the Panthers held onto their early lead to prevail by the score of 33–21, securing the first pick in the 2023 USFL draft and dropping the Maulers to last place in the final league standings.

== Standings ==
North Division
#		W	L	PCT	GB	DIV	PF	PA	STK
1	(y) New Jersey Generals	9	1	.900	–	6–0	232	182	W9
2	(x) Philadelphia Stars	6	4	.600	3	4–2	262	243	L1
3	(e) Michigan Panthers	2	8	.200	7	2–4	211	236	W1
4	(e) Pittsburgh Maulers	1	9	.100	8	0–6	147	243	L5
(x)–clinched playoff berth; (y)–clinched division; (e)–eliminated from playoff contention

=== Postseason ===
Despite having the worst record in the 2022 USFL season, with 1–9, they have earned the 2nd pick in every round of the 2023 USFL draft after losing to the 2–8 Michigan Panthers in week 10. The Maulers only win of the 2022 USFL season was a week 5 upset against the Houston Gamblers, winning 21–20.
