= Maurice Alexander (wide receiver) =

American football player (born 1997)

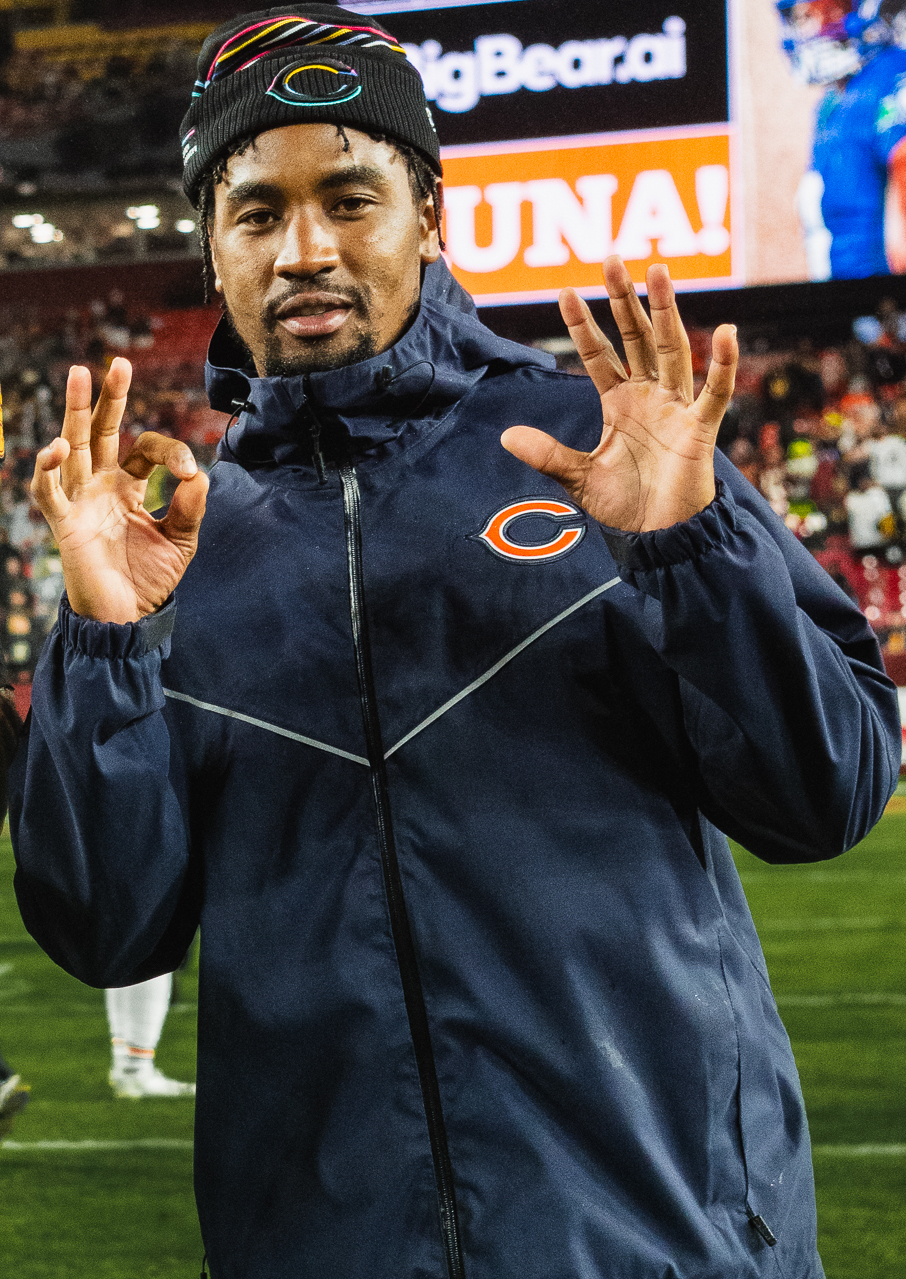
- Alexander in 2025

Profile
- Position: Wide receiver

Personal information
- Born: January 10, 1997 (age 29); Florida City, Florida, U.S.
- Listed height: 5 ft 10 in (1.78 m)
- Listed weight: 173 lb (78 kg)

Career information
- High school: Booker T. Washington (Miami, Florida)
- College: FIU (2015–2019)
- NFL draft: 2020: undrafted

Career history
- Philadelphia Stars (2022); Detroit Lions (2022–2024); Chicago Bears (2025)

Awards and highlights
- All-USFL Team (2022) (Note: Selected as a kickoff returner); USFL kickoff return yards leader (2022); First-team All-C-USA (2018)

Career NFL statistics as of 2024
- Receptions: 1
- Receiving yards: 7
- Stats at Pro Football Reference

Maurice Alexander Jr. (born January 10, 1997) is an American professional football wide receiver. He was selected with the eighth pick in the 17th round (No. 139 overall) of the 2022 USFL draft. He played college football for the FIU Panthers. After college, he went unsigned as an undrafted free agent in the 2020 NFL draft.

== Early life ==
As a junior, Alexander threw for 2,111 yards and 26 touchdowns on his way to earning Second-team All-Miami Dade County selection, as well as being named 2014 Team MVP for Booker T. Washington Tornadoes.

As a senior, he guided the Tornadoes to a perfect 15–0 season, throwing for 3,060 yards and 32 touchdowns, rushing for 466 yards seven touchdowns. This culminated with a state championship, and 34–28 victory in the 2015 Burger King State Champions Bowl Series against Bingham Miners, with Alexander rushing for the winning touchdown. He was named 2015 Dade County Player of the Year, First-team All-Date County, Class 4A First-team All-State and Booker T. Washington Offensive MVP.

== College career ==
Alexander was recruited to Florida International University as a dual-threat player. After redshirting the 2015 season, Alexander went on to appear in eight games (starting four) as a redshirt freshman. He was primarily a backup to quarterback Alex McGough with his gametime coming in relief of McGough. He finished the 2016 season with 613 passing yards and two touchdowns, 109 rushing yards and one rushing touchdown.

In the 2017 season Alexander played in eight games for the Panthers. He filled in, in the 2017 Gasparilla Bowl when McGough went down with a fractured collarbone. FIU went on to lose the game 28–3 with Alexander completing 16-of-33 passes for 162 yards being intercepted twice.

At the beginning of his redshirt junior year, Alexander made the switch from quarterback to wide receiver. He featured in 13 games (starting nine) finishing first on the team in receptions (40), second in receiving touchdowns (5) and third in receiving yards (474). Against UMass, Alexander became the first FIU Panther in school history to score a receiving and punt return touchdown in the same game. He ended the season being named First-team All-Conference USA as a punt returner.

Alexander's 2019 season ended prematurely after 9 games, suffering a season ending injury against Old Dominion. He once again had a game to remember against UMass, racking up 140 yards in punt returns including a 90-yard touchdown return, the longest of the season in the FBS. His best performance came at Middle Tennessee catching five passes for 87 yards, scoring his only receiving touchdown of the year.

=== College statistics ===
Season	Team	GP	Passing						Receiving				Rushing				Kick returns				Punt returns			
Season	Team	GP	Cmp	Att	Pct	Yards	TD	Int	Rec	Yds	Avg	TD	Att	Yds	Avg	TD	Ret	Yds	Avg	TD	Ret	Yds	Avg	TD
2015	FIU	Redshirted the 2015 season																						
2016	FIU	8	51	87	58.6	613	2	6	0	0	0	0	55	109	2.0	1	0	0	0	0	0	0	0	0
2017	FIU	8	18	39	46.2	174	0	2	0	0	0	0	22	7	0.3	0	0	0	0	0	0	0	0	0
2018	FIU	13	2	2	100.0	40	0	0	40	474	11.9	5	17	115	6.8	2	1	16	16.0	0	15	219	14.6	1
2019	FIU	9	1	2	50.0	22	0	0	25	298	11.9	1	9	42	4.7	0	1	18	18.0	0	10	187	18.7	1
Career		38	72	130	55.4	849	2	8	65	772	11.9	6	103	273	2.7	3	2	34	17.0	0	25	406	16.2	2

== Professional career ==
Pre-draft measurables
Height	Weight
5 ft 10 1/4 in (1.78 m)	180 lb (82 kg)
Values from Pro Day

=== Philadelphia Stars ===
On February 23, 2022, Alexander was selected by Philadelphia Stars of the United States Football League (USFL) on Day 2 of the 2022 USFL draft. Wide receivers became eligible for selection between rounds 13–17 and again in the supplemental draft. Alexander was the penultimate wide receiver selected in the draft proper, picked in round 17, 139th overall.

Alexander was named in the Week 2 All-USFL Team. He finished the game against Pittsburgh Maulers with 186 all-purpose yards, 87 receiving yards from 8 receptions and 2 receiving touchdowns. Despite this, he has been used predominantly as a return specialist, leading the team in both kick and punt return yards.

=== Detroit Lions ===
Alexander signed with the Detroit Lions on August 3, 2022. On August 30, he was waived and signed to the practice squad the next day. He was promoted to the active roster on October 8. Alexander was waived two days later. He was re-signed to the practice squad on October 12, and was promoted back to the active roster on October 22. Alexander was waived on October 24 and re-signed to the practice squad two days later. Alexander signed a reserve/future contract with Detroit on January 9, 2023.

On August 29, 2023, Alexander was waived by the Lions and re-signed to the practice squad the following day. He signed a reserve/future contract on January 30, 2024.

On August 27, 2024, Alexander was waived by the Lions. He was re-signed to the practice squad on November 13. He was promoted to the active roster on November 27. Alexander was waived on November 30 and re-signed to the practice squad four days later.

=== Chicago Bears ===
On January 31, 2025, Alexander signed with the Chicago Bears. On August 26, he was waived as part of final roster cuts and signed to the practice squad the following day. On January 20, 2026, he signed a reserve/futures contract with Chicago.

On August 30, 2026, Alexander was waived by the Bears as a part of final roster cuts.

=== Professional statistics ===
Regular season

USFL statistics
Year	Team	Games		Receiving					Kick return					Punt return				
Year	Team	GP	GS	Rec	Yds	Avg	Lng	TD	Att	Yds	Avg	Lng	TD	Att	Yds	Avg	Lng	TD
2022	PHI	10	6	20	234	11.7	32	2	25	787	31.5	66	0	13	164	12.6	30	0
Career		10	6	20	234	11.7	32	2	25	787	31.5	66	0	13	164	12.6	30	0

Postseason

USFL statistics
Year	Team	Games		Receiving					Kick return					Punt return				
Year	Team	GP	GS	Rec	Yds	Avg	Lng	TD	Att	Yds	Avg	Lng	TD	Att	Yds	Avg	Lng	TD
2022	PHI	1	0	0	0	0.0	0	0	3	77	25.7	37	0	1	87	87.0	87	1
Career																		

== Personal life ==
Alexander is the son of Maurice Alexander Sr. and Kevia Morrison. He has one sibling, Maurkevia.

Alexander has three cousins who played American football at the collegiate level. Shaun and Nate Terry played at West Virginia while James Terry played at Kansas State.
