= Garrett McGhin =

American football player (born 1995)

No. 55
- Position: Guard

Personal information
- Born: October 13, 1995 (age 31); Tallahassee, Florida, U.S.
- Listed height: 6 ft 6 in (1.98 m)
- Listed weight: 320 lb (145 kg)

Career information
- High school: Florida (Tallahassee)
- College: East Carolina
- NFL draft: 2019: undrafted

Career history
- Buffalo Bills (2019)*; Carolina Panthers (2019); Buffalo Bills (2020)*; Jacksonville Jaguars (2020–2021)*; New Jersey Generals (2022); New York Giants (2022)*; Arlington Renegades (2023); Buffalo Bills (2023)*; Arlington Renegades (2024–2025)
- * Offseason or practice squad member only

Awards and highlights
- XFL champion (2023); All-USFL Team (2022)

Career NFL statistics
- Games played: 2
- Stats at Pro Football Reference

Garrett McGhin (born October 13, 1995) is an American former professional football player who was a guard in the National Football League (NFL). He played college football for the East Carolina Pirates.

== Professional career ==
Pre-draft measurables
Height	Weight	Arm length	Hand span	40-yard dash	10-yard split	20-yard split	20-yard shuttle	Three-cone drill	Vertical jump	Broad jump	Bench press
6 ft 6 1/8 in (1.98 m)	316 lb (143 kg)	35 1/8 in (0.89 m)	10 1/8 in (0.26 m)	5.34 s	1.89 s	3.14 s	4.87 s	8.00 s	24.5 in (0.62 m)	8 ft 4 in (2.54 m)	23 reps
All values from Pro Day

=== Buffalo Bills (first stint) ===
McGhin was signed by the Buffalo Bills as an undrafted free agent on May 13, 2019. He was placed on injured reserve on August 20, 2019, and later released on August 24.

=== Carolina Panthers ===
On November 12, 2019, McGhin was signed to the Carolina Panthers practice squad. He was promoted to the active roster on November 25, 2019. He played in two games before being placed on injured reserve on December 19, 2019. He was waived on March 18, 2020.

=== Buffalo Bills (second stint) ===
McGhin signed with the Bills on April 23, 2020. He was waived on July 27, 2020.

=== Jacksonville Jaguars ===
McGhin was claimed off of waivers by the Jacksonville Jaguars on July 28, 2020. He was waived on September 5, 2020. He was re-signed to their practice squad on November 9, 2020. He signed a reserve/future contract on January 4, 2021. He was waived on August 25, 2021.

=== New Jersey Generals ===
McGhin was selected in the 5th round of the 2022 USFL draft by the New Jersey Generals. He was ruled inactive for the team's game against the Pittsburgh Maulers on May 7, 2022. He was transferred back to the active roster on May 12.

=== New York Giants ===
On July 27, 2022, McGhin signed with the New York Giants. He was waived on August 30, 2022, and signed to the practice squad the next day. On September 1, 2022, he was released.

=== Arlington Renegades (first stint) ===
On November 17, 2022, McGhin was selected by the Arlington Renegades of the XFL. He was released from his contract on August 20, 2023.

=== Buffalo Bills (third stint) ===
On August 21, 2023, McGhin signed with the Bills. He was released on August 27, 2023.

=== Arlington Renegades (second stint) ===
On December 4, 2023, McGhin was re-signed by the Renegades. He was placed on injured reserve on March 2, 2024.

McGhin retired after the 2025 UFL Season.
