= Cameron Hunt =

American football player (born 1994)

No. 78
- Position: Guard

Personal information
- Born: December 17, 1994 (age 31); Corona, California, U.S.
- Listed height: 6 ft 4 in (1.93 m)
- Listed weight: 305 lb (138 kg)

Career information
- High school: Centennial (Corona, California)
- College: Oregon
- NFL draft: 2017: undrafted

Career history
- Denver Broncos (2017)*; San Francisco 49ers (2017)*; Oakland Raiders (2018–2019); Birmingham Stallions (2022); Los Angeles Chargers (2022)*; Arlington Renegades (2023–2024)
- * Offseason or practice squad member only

Awards and highlights
- XFL champion (2023); USFL champion (2022); All-USFL Team (2022)
- Stats at Pro Football Reference

Cameron Hunt (born December 17, 1994) is an American former professional football guard. He played college football at Oregon.

== Early life ==
Hunt attended Centennial High School in Corona, California, where he played varsity baseball and football. He played both as an offensive and defensive lineman. He was described as "the best offensive lineman" ever at his high school, and was named the a USA Today 2nd team All-American and Los Angeles Times Lineman of the Year for his senior 2012 season, when he helped lead his team to a 14–2 record and a playoff berth. Hunt initially committed to California on July 8, 2012, but switched his commitment to Oregon on February 6, 2013, choosing the Ducks over California, Oregon State, UCLA, Michigan, and Nebraska.

College recruiting
Name	Hometown	School	Height	Weight	40^{‡}	Commit date
Cameron Hunt; OT	Corona, California	Centennial HS	6 ft 5 in (1.96 m)	275 lb (125 kg)	5.47	Feb 6, 2013
Cameron Hunt; OT	Recruit ratings: Rivals: 247Sports: ESPN:					
Overall recruit ranking: Rivals: 19 (OT) ESPN: 15 (OT)
Note: In many cases, Scout, Rivals, 247Sports, On3, and ESPN may conflict in their listings of height and weight.; In these cases, the average was taken. ESPN grades are on a 100-point scale.; Sources: "2014 Team Ranking". Rivals.com.

== College career ==
=== Freshman season (2013) ===
Hunt started the last seven games of Oregon's 2013 season, becoming the team's first true freshman starter on the offensive line since 1997, although he had some playing time in all 13 games. He debuted at the right tackle position against Washington State, but switched to right guard for the rest of the season.

=== Sophomore season (2014) ===
Hunt continued to play a key role in Oregon's young offensive line, as he was the most experienced offensive lineman remaining at Oregon. He helped lead the Ducks to the 2015 College Football Playoff National Championship, a loss to Ohio State.

=== Junior season (2015) ===
Hunt started all games except that against Georgia State.

=== Senior season (2016) ===
Hunt started all 12 games at the right guard position, and received the Ed Moshofsky Trophy for the Team's Outstanding Offensive Lineman. He also received the Pancake Club Award for the Most Pancake Blocks.

== Professional career ==
Pre-draft measurables
Height	Weight	Arm length	Hand span	40-yard dash	10-yard split	20-yard split	20-yard shuttle	Three-cone drill	Vertical jump	Broad jump	Bench press
6 ft 3 3/4 in (1.92 m)	307 lb (139 kg)	31 7/8 in (0.81 m)	9 3/8 in (0.24 m)	5.47 s	1.82 s	3.09 s	4.70 s	7.96 s	23.5 in (0.60 m)	7 ft 10 in (2.39 m)	24 reps
All values from Pro Day

=== Denver Broncos ===
Hunt went undrafted in the 2017 NFL draft, and signed with the Denver Broncos as an undrafted free agent on May 12, 2017. He was waived by the team on September 2, 2017.

=== San Francisco 49ers ===
Hunt was signed to the San Francisco 49ers practice squad on November 14, 2017.

=== Oakland Raiders ===
Hunt was signed by the Oakland Raiders on May 17, 2018. He was waived on September 1, 2018. He was re-signed to the active roster on December 11, 2018.

Hunt was waived on April 30, 2019, but was re-signed on August 17, 2019. He was waived/injured during final roster cuts on August 30, 2019, and reverted to the team's injured reserve list on September 1.

=== Birmingham Stallions ===
Hunt was drafted by the Birmingham Stallions in the 2022 USFL draft.

=== Los Angeles Chargers ===
On August 8, 2022, Hunt signed with the Los Angeles Chargers. He was waived on August 22.

=== Arlington Renegades ===
On November 17, 2022, Hunt was drafted by the Arlington Renegades of the XFL.
