= Brandon Wright =

American football player (born 1997)

No. 1
- Position: Punter / placekicker

Personal information
- Born: February 18, 1997 (age 29); Atlanta, Georgia, U.S.
- Listed height: 5 ft 10 in (1.78 m)
- Listed weight: 182 lb (83 kg)

Career information
- High school: KIPP Atlanta Collegiate (Atlanta, Georgia)
- College: Georgia State (2015–2019)
- NFL draft: 2020: undrafted

Career history
- Jacksonville Jaguars (2020); Los Angeles Rams (2020–2021)*; Tampa Bay Bandits (2022); Memphis Showboats (2023); Los Angeles Rams (2023)*; Memphis Showboats (2024)*
- * Offseason or practice squad member only

Awards and highlights
- All-USFL Team (2022); USFL punting yards leader (2022); First-team All-Sun Belt (2018)

Career NFL statistics
- Extra points: 1
- PAT attempts: 2
- Stats at Pro Football Reference

Brandon-Earl Wright (born February 18, 1997) is an American former football punter and placekicker. He played college football at Georgia State University.

== College career ==
Wright was a member of the Georgia State Panthers for five seasons, redshirting as a true freshman, and was the team's primary punter for four years and kicker for his final two seasons as well.

== Professional career ==
Pre-draft measurables
Height	Weight	Arm length	Hand span	Vertical jump
5 ft 9 1/8 in (1.76 m)	170 lb (77 kg)	28 3/8 in (0.72 m)	9 3/4 in (0.25 m)	39.5 in (1.00 m)
All values from Pro Day

=== Jacksonville Jaguars ===
Wright was signed by the Jacksonville Jaguars as an undrafted free agent on April 28, 2020. He was waived on August 8, 2020, but was re-signed to the team's practice squad on September 7, 2020. Wright was promoted to the active roster on September 23, 2020, after Josh Lambo was placed on injured reserve. He suffered a groin injury in Week 3 and was waived/injured on September 28, 2020. He subsequently reverted to the team's injured reserve list on September 29, and was waived with an injury settlement the next day.

=== Los Angeles Rams (first stint) ===
On December 15, 2020, Wright signed with the practice squad of the Los Angeles Rams. On January 18, 2021, Wright signed a reserve/futures contract with the Rams. On August 10, 2021, Wright was waived by the Rams.

=== Tampa Bay Bandits ===
On February 23, 2022, Wright was selected by the Tampa Bay Bandits with the 4th pick of the 32nd round in the United States Football League’s (USFL) first inaugural draft. On June 16, 2022, it was announced that Wright was selected as the punter for the inaugural All-USFL team.

=== Memphis Showboats (first stint) ===
Wright and all other Tampa Bay Bandits players were transferred to the Memphis Showboats after it was announced that the Bandits were taking a hiatus and that the Showboats were joining the league. Wright re-signed with the Showboats on August 22, 2023, but was released from his contract on September 11, 2023, to sign with an NFL team.

=== Los Angeles Rams (second stint) ===
On September 12, 2023, Wright signed with the practice squad of the Los Angeles Rams. He had his practice squad contract terminated a week later.

=== Memphis Showboats (second stint) ===
On October 6, 2023, Wright re-signed with the Memphis Showboats. He was removed from the roster on February 15, 2024.
