= Mikey Daniel =

American football player (born 1996)

No. 38
- Position: Fullback

Personal information
- Born: November 3, 1996 (age 30); Brookings, South Dakota, U.S.
- Listed height: 6 ft 0 in (1.83 m)
- Listed weight: 235 lb (107 kg)

Career information
- High school: Brookings High School (Brookings, South Dakota)
- College: South Dakota State
- NFL draft: 2020: undrafted

Career history
- Atlanta Falcons (2020)*; Carolina Panthers (2021)*; Pittsburgh Maulers (2022)
- * Offseason or practice squad member only

Mikey Daniel (born November 3, 1996) is an American former professional football running back. He played college football at South Dakota State.

== Professional career ==
=== Atlanta Falcons ===
Daniel signed with the Atlanta Falcons as an undrafted free agent following the 2020 NFL draft on April 27, 2020. He was waived during final roster cuts on September 5.

=== Carolina Panthers ===
On April 13, 2021, Daniel was signed with the Carolina Panthers to fill in for Alex Armah. He was waived on August 10, 2021.

=== Pittsburgh Maulers ===
Daniel was signed on April 4, 2022, by the Pittsburgh Maulers. He was transferred to the team's inactive roster on May 6 with a head injury. He was moved back to the active roster on May 14. He was released after the season on January 2, 2023.
