= Rashard Davis =

American football player (born 1995)

Profile
- Position: Wide receiver

Personal information
- Born: September 14, 1995 (age 31); Charlottesville, Virginia, U.S.
- Listed height: 5 ft 9 in (1.75 m)
- Listed weight: 175 lb (79 kg)

Career information
- High school: Charlottesville (Virginia)
- College: James Madison
- NFL draft: 2017: undrafted

Career history
- Philadelphia Eagles (2017–2018)*; Oakland Raiders (2018–2019)*; Kansas City Chiefs (2019)*; Tennessee Titans (2019–2020); Saskatchewan Roughriders (2021); Tampa Bay Bandits (2022); New York Jets (2022)*; Memphis Showboats (2023); BC Lions (2025)*; Columbus Aviators (2026)
- * Offseason or practice squad member only

Awards and highlights
- Super Bowl champion (LII); USFL punt return yards leader (2022); FCS national champion (2016); Second-team FCS All-American; CAA Special Teams Player of the Year
- Stats at Pro Football Reference

Rashard Markese Davis (born September 14, 1995) is an American professional football wide receiver. He played college football at James Madison University. Davis has been a member of the Philadelphia Eagles, Oakland Raiders, Kansas City Chiefs, Tennessee Titans, Saskatchewan Roughriders, Tampa Bay Bandits, New York Jets, and Memphis Showboats.

== College career ==
Davis played for the James Madison University football team. As a sophomore he played in 12 games, posting 21 receptions for 254 yards and two receiving touchdowns. As a junior he played in 11 games, making nine starts at slot receiver posting 39 receptions for 592 yards and six touchdowns.

As a senior he played in all 15 games, making 12 starts. He set JMU and CAA single-season record with an FCS-best four punt returns for a touchdown. After the season he was named to the Associated Press All-FCS second-team as an all-purpose player. He was also named CAA Special Teams Player of the Year.

== Professional career ==
Pre-draft measurables
Height	Weight	Arm length	Hand span	Wingspan	40-yard dash	10-yard split	20-yard split	20-yard shuttle	Three-cone drill	Vertical jump	Broad jump	Bench press
5 ft 8 1/8 in (1.73 m)	173 lb (78 kg)	29 1/4 in (0.74 m)	9 in (0.23 m)	5 ft 11 1/2 in (1.82 m)	4.47 s	1.59 s	2.58 s	4.05 s	6.90 s	35.5 in (0.90 m)	10 ft 1 in (3.07 m)	9 reps
All values from Pro Day

=== Philadelphia Eagles ===
On August 13, 2017, Davis signed with the Philadelphia Eagles as an undrafted free agent. He was waived on September 1, 2017. He was signed to the practice squad on October 4, 2017, but was released six days later. He was re-signed again on October 19, 2017. He was released on December 14, 2017. He was re-signed on December 27, 2017. While Davis was on the practice squad, the Eagles defeated the New England Patriots in Super Bowl LII, which earned Davis a Super Bowl ring. He signed a reserve/future contract with the Eagles on February 7, 2018. On September 1, 2018, Davis was waived by the Eagles and was signed to the practice squad the next day. He was released on September 7, 2018.

=== Oakland Raiders ===
On November 14, 2018, Davis was signed to the Oakland Raiders practice squad. He was released on November 20, 2018. He was re-signed on December 27, 2018. He signed a reserve/future contract with the Raiders on January 1, 2019. He was waived on April 30, 2019.

=== Kansas City Chiefs ===
On May 7, 2019, Davis signed with the Kansas City Chiefs. He was waived on August 31, 2019.

On October 15, 2019, Davis was drafted with the first overall pick in the skill players round of the 2020 XFL draft by the DC Defenders, but did not sign with the league.

=== Tennessee Titans ===
On November 5, 2019, Davis was signed to the Tennessee Titans practice squad. He was promoted to the active roster on December 23, 2019. He was waived on September 5, 2020. He was re-signed to their practice squad on December 24, 2020. He was released on January 6, 2021. He was signed to a futures contract by the Titans on January 11, 2021. He was waived on May 17, 2021.

=== Saskatchewan Roughriders ===
On September 16, 2021, Davis agreed to a contract with the Saskatchewan Roughriders of the Canadian Football League (CFL). Davis spent most of his time on the practice roster and was released December 6, 2021.

=== New York Jets ===
On July 26, 2022, Davis signed with the New York Jets. He was released on August 16, 2022.

=== Memphis Showboats ===
Davis signed with the Memphis Showboats of the USFL on January 11, 2023. He was placed on the team's injured reserve list on May 1. He was waived on March 23, 2024.

=== BC Lions ===
On December 27, 2024, Davis signed with the BC Lions of the Canadian Football League (CFL). He was released during training camp cuts on June 1, 2025.

=== Columbus Aviators ===
On February 1, 2026, Davis signed with the Columbus Aviators of the United Football League (UFL).
