= DeMarquis Gates =

American football player (born 1996)

Profile
- Position: Linebacker

Personal information
- Born: March 7, 1996 (age 30); Hampton, Georgia, U.S.
- Listed height: 6 ft 2 in (1.88 m)
- Listed weight: 230 lb (104 kg)

Career information
- High school: Lovejoy (Hampton, Georgia)
- College: Ole Miss
- NFL draft: 2018: undrafted

Career history
- Cleveland Browns (2018)*; Memphis Express (2019); Washington Redskins (2019)*; Houston Roughnecks (2020); Minnesota Vikings (2020)*; Saskatchewan Roughriders (2021); Birmingham Stallions (2022); Chicago Bears (2022–2023); Birmingham Stallions (2024–2025); Ottawa Redblacks (2026)*
- * Offseason or practice squad member only

Awards and highlights
- UFL champion (2024); USFL champion (2022); All-USFL Team (2022); Midseason All-XFL Team (2020)

Career NFL statistics as of 2023
- Total tackles: 2
- Stats at Pro Football Reference

DeMarquis Larenz Gates (born March 7, 1996) is an American professional football linebacker. He played college football for the Ole Miss Rebels.

== Early life ==
Gates attended Lovejoy High School in Hampton, Georgia. As a junior at Lovejoy, Gates made 132 tackles and was named All-Region. He missed his senior season with a torn ACL. Ranked the No. 16 outside linebacker in his class by 247Sports, Gates committed to Ole Miss on March 28, 2013.

== College career ==
Gates played linebacker at Ole Miss Rebels. In November 2015, Gates made his second career start against LSU in place of the injured Denzel Nkemdiche. Gates finished with 14 tackles, a pass breakup, and a quarterback hurry and was named Southeastern Conference (SEC) Defensive Player of the Week. He led the team in tackles from 2015 to 2017, becoming the first Ole Miss player to do so since Abdul Jackson from 1992 to 1994. Prior to the 2017 season, he was named to the Dick Butkus Award watchlist. During his senior season in 2017, Gates made 114 tackles, including an SEC-best 70 solo tackles that ranked 13th in FBS. He became the first Ole Miss player with more than 100 tackles since Patrick Willis in 2006. In 49 career games, Gates made 282 tackles, nine pass breakups, six sacks, four forced fumbles and a fumble recovery.

== Professional career ==
Pre-draft measurables
Height	Weight	Arm length	Hand span	40-yard dash	10-yard split	20-yard split	20-yard shuttle	Three-cone drill	Vertical jump	Broad jump	Bench press
6 ft 2 3/8 in (1.89 m)	221 lb (100 kg)	33 1/2 in (0.85 m)	9 3/8 in (0.24 m)	4.61 s	1.62 s	2.75 s	4.29 s	7.40 s	34.5 in (0.88 m)	10 ft 5 in (3.18 m)	17 reps
All values from Pro Day

=== Cleveland Browns ===
After going undrafted in the 2018 NFL draft, Gates was signed by the Cleveland Browns on May 22, 2018. He was waived on June 14.

=== Memphis Express ===
Gates joined the Memphis Express of the Alliance of American Football (AAF). On March 28, 2019, Gates was named AAF Defensive Player of the Week. The AAF abruptly folded on April 2 after eight games. Gates led the AAF in tackles with 52 and forced fumbles with five.

=== Washington Redskins ===
On April 11, 2019, Gates was signed by the Washington Redskins. He was waived on June 11.

=== Houston Roughnecks ===
Gates was selected by the Houston Roughnecks of the XFL in Phase 3 Round 8 of the 2020 XFL draft. Before the season was canceled due to the coronavirus pandemic, Gates had 32 tackles (second on the team) and 2.0 sacks (tied for the team lead) for the Roughnecks. He had a game-winning fumble recovery against the Dallas Renegades and forced a fumble late versus the Seattle Dragons. He had his contract terminated when the league suspended operations on April 10, 2020.

=== Minnesota Vikings ===
On March 25, Gates signed with the Minnesota Vikings. He was waived on August 13, 2020.

=== TSL Blues ===
Gates was selected by the Blues of The Spring League during its player selection draft on October 12, 2020.

=== Saskatchewan Roughriders ===
He signed with the Saskatchewan Roughriders of the Canadian Football League (CFL) on December 17, 2020. He played in five games during the CFL's shortened 2021 regular season, recording five tackles and three special teams tackles.

=== Birmingham Stallions (first stint) ===
Gates was selected by the Birmingham Stallions of the United States Football League (USFL) with the second pick in the 29th round of the 2022 USFL draft. He was ruled inactive for the team's game against the Tampa Bay Bandits on May 7, 2022. He was moved back to the active roster on May 14.

=== Chicago Bears ===
On August 6, 2022, Gates signed with the Chicago Bears. He was waived on August 30, 2022, and signed to the practice squad the next day. On January 4, 2023, the Bears signed him to the active roster.

On August 29, 2023, Gates was waived by the Bears and re-signed to the practice squad. He was promoted to the active roster on December 16. Gates was released on January 4, 2024.

=== Birmingham Stallions (second stint) ===
On February 13, 2024, Gates re-signed with the Stallions, now with the United Football League (UFL). He re-signed with the team on September 20, 2024.

=== Ottawa Redblacks ===
On September 30, 2026, Gates signed with the Ottawa Redblacks practice roster. On October 26, he was released.

=== Statistics ===
Year	League	Team	Games	Tackles				Interceptions					Fumbles			
Year	League	Team	GP	Cmb	Solo	Ast	Sck	Int	Yds	Avg	Lng	TD	FF	FR	Yds	TD
2019	AAF	MEM	8	72	53	19	1.0	0	0	0.0	0	0	5	2	1	0
2020	XFL	HOU	5	32	25	7	2.0	1	9	9.0	9	0	1	3	–	–
2021	CFL	SSK	5	5	5	0	0.0	0	0	0.0	0	0	1	0	0	0
2022	USFL	BHAM	9	68	44	24	6.5	1	19	19.0	19	0	2	1	–	0
2022	NFL	CHI	3	1	0	1	0	0	0	0.0	0	0	0	0	0	0
2023	NFL	CHI	4	1	1	0	0	0	0	0.0	0	0	0	1	0	0
Career			34	179	128	51	9.5	2	28	14.0	19	0	9	7	1	0
