= Jaylon McClain-Sapp =

American football player (born 1998)

No. 7
- Position: Defensive back

Personal information
- Born: July 16, 1998 (age 28); Jacksonville, Florida, U.S.
- Listed height: 5 ft 11 in (1.80 m)
- Listed weight: 183 lb (83 kg)

Career information
- High school: First Coast (Jacksonville, Florida)
- College: Marshall (2016–2020)
- NFL draft: 2021: undrafted

Career history
- Kansas City Chiefs (2021)*; Pittsburgh Maulers (2022); BC Lions (2023)*; Ottawa Redblacks (2024)*
- * Offseason or practice squad member only
- Stats at Pro Football Reference

Jaylon McClain-Sapp (born July 16, 1998) is an American former professional football defensive back. He played college football for the Marshall Thundering Herd and has been a member of the Kansas City Chiefs of the National Football League (NFL), the Pittsburgh Maulers of the United States Football League (USFL), and the BC Lions and Ottawa Redblacks of the Canadian Football League (CFL).

== Early life and education ==
McClain-Sapp attended high school at First Coast High School. Coming out of high school, he was a two star recruit, having offers from Marshall, Rutgers, South Alabama, UTSA, Virginia and Wake Forest. He committed to Marshall in 2016.

== College career ==
In the 2016 season at Marshall, McClain-Sapp played in eight games, making four tackles. In the next season, he played in seven games, in which he made 13 tackles. He also played in the 2017 New Mexico Bowl, which Marshall won, that season. In his junior season, he played in three games, making 11 tackles, before redshirting. In the 2019 season, he played 10 games while recording eight tackles. He finished his senior season with 10 games played and 31 tackles.

== Professional career ==
McClain-Sapp was unselected in the 2021 NFL draft. He signed as an undrafted free agent with the Kansas City Chiefs in May 2021. He was waived alongside Tajae Sharpe a short time after to make room on the roster for Daurice Fountain and Manny Patterson.

He was drafted with the first pick of the 11th round of the 2022 USFL draft by the Pittsburgh Maulers. He played with the team in the 2022 USFL season. He was set to return to the Maulers for the 2023 season, prior to the 2023 USFL draft but was released in April 2023.

In April 2023, he signed with the Canadian BC Lions together with Tre Webb and Casey Bednarski. On May 29, 2023, after having only appeared in preseason, he was among 13 released by the Lions. In January 2024, he signed with the Ottawa Redblacks, but he later was released in June 2024, just before the start of the 2024 CFL season.
