= Chris Odom =

American football player (born 1994)

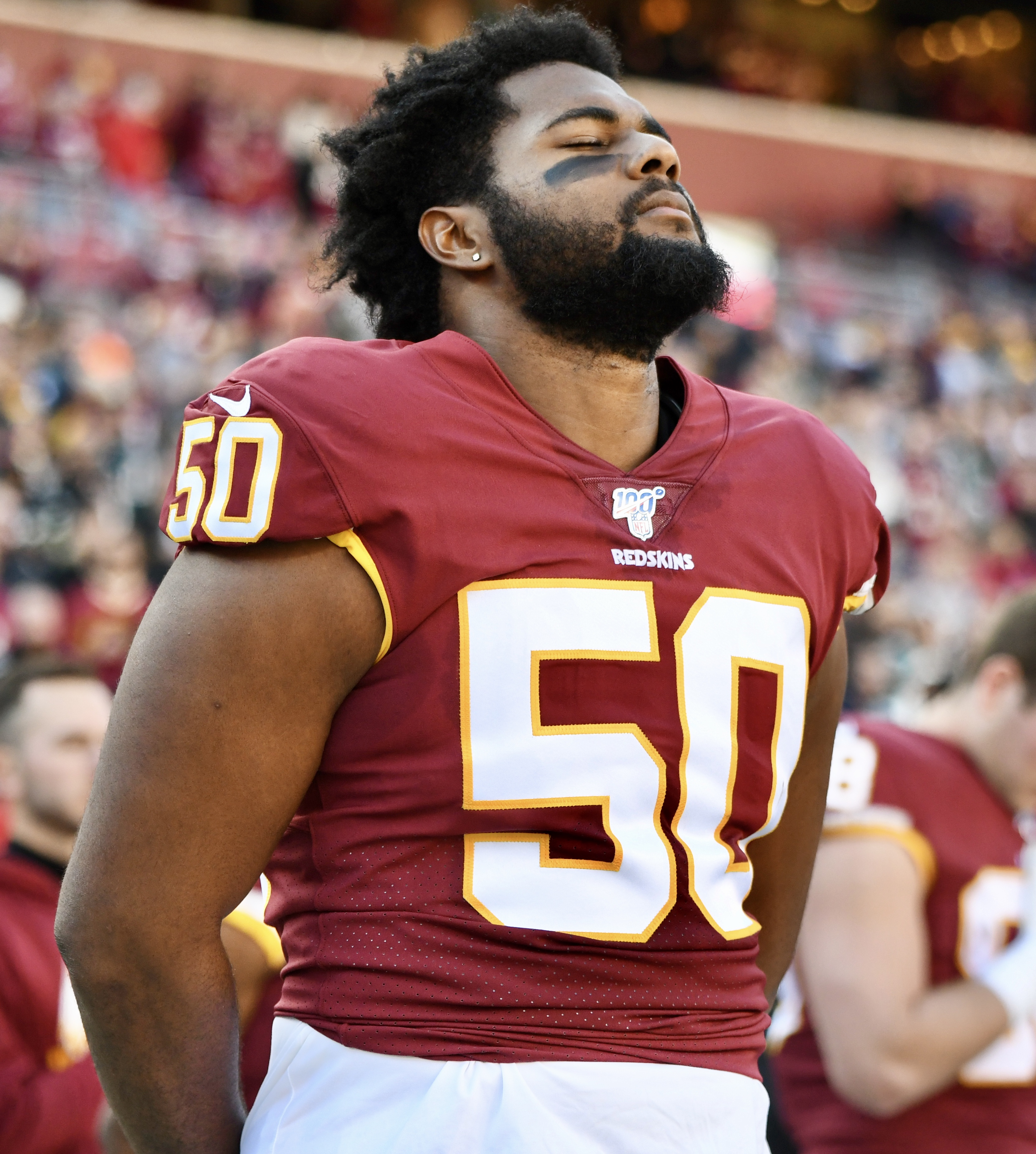
- Odom with the Washington Redskins in 2019

Profile
- Position: Defensive end

Personal information
- Born: September 16, 1994 (age 32); Arlington, Texas, U.S.
- Listed height: 6 ft 4 in (1.93 m)
- Listed weight: 262 lb (119 kg)

Career information
- High school: Martin (Arlington)
- College: Arkansas State (2013–2016)
- NFL draft: 2017: undrafted

Career history
- Atlanta Falcons (2017)*; Green Bay Packers (2017); Salt Lake Stallions (2019); Atlanta Falcons (2019)*; Washington Redskins (2019); Calgary Stampeders (2021); Houston Gamblers (2022); Cleveland Browns (2022); Houston Gamblers / Roughnecks (2024); Arlington Renegades (2025)
- * Offseason or practice squad member only

Awards and highlights
- All-UFL Team (2024); USFL Defensive Player of the Year (2022); All-USFL Team (2022); USFL sacks leader (2022); USFL forced fumbles leader (2022); First-team All-Sun Belt (2016)

Career NFL statistics
- Total tackles: 16
- Sacks: 2.0
- Forced fumbles: 1
- Stats at Pro Football Reference

Chris Odom (born September 16, 1994) is an American professional football defensive end. He played college football at Arkansas State. Odom has also been a member of the Atlanta Falcons, Green Bay Packers, Salt Lake Stallions, Washington Redskins, Calgary Stampeders, Houston Roughnecks, and Cleveland Browns. With the Houston Gamblers, he led the USFL in sacks and was named its Defensive Player of the Year in 2022.

== Early life ==
Odom played high school football at Martin High School in Arlington, Texas. He recorded 32 tackles his senior year, earning all-district honors as a defensive end. He also participated in the school's track and field program.

== College career ==
Odom played for the Arkansas State Red Wolves from 2013 to 2016. He played in all 13 games in 2013, recording 8 solo tackles, 9 tackle assists and 3 sacks. He played in all 13 games, starting 3, in 2014, totaling 12 solo tackles, 2 tackle assists, 1 sack, 2 pass breakups and 1 blocked kick. Odom played in 11 games in 2015, recording 1 solo tackles, 2 tackle assists and 3 blocked kicks. His three blocked kicks were tied for the third most in school history for a single season. He played in all 13 games in 2016, totaling 28 solo tackles, 25 tackle assists, 12.5 sacks, 2 pass breakups, 4 forced fumbles and 1 blocked kick, earning First-team All-Sun Belt Conference honors. Odom participated in the College Gridiron Showcase in January 2017. His five career blocked kicks were the second most in school history. He majored in Sport Management at Arkansas State.

== Professional career ==
=== Pre-draft ===
Odom was rated the 41st best defensive end in the 2017 NFL draft by NFLDraftScout.com.

Pre-draft measurables
Height	Weight	40-yard dash	10-yard split	20-yard split	20-yard shuttle	Three-cone drill	Vertical jump	Broad jump	Bench press
6 ft 4 in (1.93 m)	262 lb (119 kg)	4.83 s	1.77 s	2.85 s	4.63 s	7.67 s	31 1/2 in (0.80 m)	9 ft 6 in (2.90 m)	20 reps
All values from Arkansas State Pro Day

=== Atlanta Falcons (first stint) ===
After going undrafted, Odom signed with the Atlanta Falcons on May 1, 2017. He was waived by the Falcons on September 2, 2017.

=== Green Bay Packers ===
Odom was claimed off waivers by the Green Bay Packers on September 3, 2017.

On September 1, 2018, Odom was waived by the Packers.

=== Salt Lake Stallions ===
In late 2018, Odom joined the Salt Lake Stallions of the Alliance of American Football (AAF). Odom recorded 7 tackles, 2.5 sacks, 8 quarterback hits, and 2 pass knockdowns during his time in the AAF.

=== Atlanta Falcons (second stint) ===
On April 15, 2019, Odom signed a two-year contract with the Falcons. He was waived on August 31, 2019.

=== Washington Redskins ===
Odom signed with the Washington Redskins' practice squad on September 2, 2019. He was released on October 8, 2019. He was re-signed on November 20. He was promoted to the active roster on November 30, 2019. In week 13 against the Carolina Panthers, Odom sacked quarterback Kyle Allen twice, one of which was a strip sack which was recovered by teammate Nate Orchard late in the fourth quarter to seal a 29–21 win. Odom finished the season with 10 tackles, 2 sacks, and a forced fumble in only 47 defensive snaps. He was released on February 14, 2020.

=== Calgary Stampeders ===
Odom signed with the Calgary Stampeders of the Canadian Football League on February 2, 2021. Odom made the practice roster and did dress for three games for Calgary, but was ultimately released on November 29, 2021.

=== Houston Gamblers (first stint) ===
Odom was drafted by the Houston Gamblers by the United States Football League (USFL) in the second round (12th overall) of the 2022 USFL draft. While the Gamblers did not qualify for the playoffs, Odom had a successful season by leading the league in sacks and forced fumbles (12.5 and 6 respectively) and was named Defensive Player of the Year. Odom also earned two distinct Player of the Week honors; following a 3 sack performance against Tampa Bay, Odom was named Defensive Player of the Week, and after blocking two field goals in one game, Odom was named Special Teams Player of the Week for week 10. In total, Odom blocked a league best 4 field goals for the 2022 season.

=== Cleveland Browns ===
Odom was signed by the Cleveland Browns on August 5, 2022. He was placed on injured reserve with a torn anterior cruciate ligament on August 29.

=== Houston Gamblers / Roughnecks (second stint) ===
On December 26, 2023, Odom re-signed with the Gamblers.

Odom and all other Gamblers players and coaches were all transferred to the Houston Roughnecks after it was announced that the Gamblers took on the identity of their XFL counterpart, the Roughnecks. He was named to the 2024 All-UFL team on June 5, 2024.

=== Arlington Renegades ===
On February 24, 2025, Odom signed with the Arlington Renegades of the United Football League (UFL). Odom recorded another 5 sacks, scored a touchdown on a fumble recovery, and led the league in tackles for a loss with 12.

== Career statistics ==
Legend
	Defensive Player of the Year
	Led the league
**Bold**	Career high

=== NFL ===
Regular season statistics
Year	Team	Games		Tackles						Interceptions					Fumbles			
Year	Team	GP	GS	Cmb	Solo	Ast	TfL	Sck	Sfty	Int	Yds	Lng	TD	PD	FF	FR	Yds	TD
2017	GB	7	0	6	3	3	1	0.0	0	0	0	0	0	0	0	0	0	0
2019	WAS	4	0	10	9	1	1	2.0	0	0	0	0	0	0	1	0	0	0
2022	CLE	0	0	Did not play due to injury														
Career		11	0	16	12	4	2	2.0	0	0	0	0	0	0	1	0	0	0

=== CFL ===
Regular season statistics
Year	Team	Games		Tackles						Interceptions					Fumbles			
Year	Team	GP	GS	Cmb	Solo	Ast	TfL	Sck	Sfty	Int	Yds	Lng	TD	PD	FF	FR	Yds	TD
2021	CAL	3	2	5	5	0	0	0.0	0	0	0	0	0	0	0	0	0	0
Career		3	2	5	5	0	0	0.0	0	0	0	0	0	0	0	0	0	0

=== AAF/USFL/UFL ===
Regular season statistics
Year	Team	League	Games		Tackles						Interceptions					Fumbles			
Year	Team	League	GP	GS	Cmb	Solo	Ast	TfL	Sck	Sfty	Int	Yds	Lng	TD	PD	FF	FR	Yds	TD
2019	SL	AAF	8	0	10	7	3	4	2.5	0	0	0	0	0	1	0	0	0	0
2022	HOU	USFL	10	10	41	29	12	8	12.5	0	0	0	0	0	1	6	0	0	0
2024	HOU	UFL	9	7	32	21	11	8	5.0	0	0	0	0	0	0	2	0	0	0
2025	ARL	UFL	10	2	28	20	8	12	5.0	0	0	0	0	0	0	0	1	39	1
Career			37	19	111	77	34	32	25.0	0	0	0	0	0	2	8	1	39	1

== Personal life ==
Odom's father, Cliff, also played in the NFL and was drafted by the Browns in the 3rd round of the 1980 NFL draft.
