= Jeremiah Pharms Jr. =

American football player (born 1996)

No. 98 – New England Patriots
- Position: Defensive tackle
- Roster status: Practice squad

Personal information
- Born: October 16, 1996 (age 30); Stockton, California, U.S.
- Listed height: 6 ft 2 in (1.88 m)
- Listed weight: 300 lb (136 kg)

Career information
- High school: Stagg (Stockton, California)
- College: Sacramento City (2015); San Joaquin Delta (2016–2017); Friends (2018–2019)
- NFL draft: 2020: undrafted

Career history
- Wichita Force (2021); Pittsburgh Maulers (2022); New England Patriots (2022–present)

Career NFL statistics as of 2025
- Total tackles: 42
- Sacks: 2
- Fumble recoveries: 1
- Stats at Pro Football Reference

Jeremiah Keith Pharms Jr. (born October 16, 1996) is an American professional football defensive tackle for the New England Patriots in the National Football League (NFL). He has previously played for the Pittsburgh Maulers of the United States Football League.

== College career ==
He played college football at Sacramento City, San Joaquin Delta, and Friends.

== Professional career ==
Pre-draft measurables
Height	Weight	Arm length	Hand span	Wingspan
6 ft 1 1/2 in (1.87 m)	274 lb (124 kg)	31 1/2 in (0.80 m)	9 in (0.23 m)	6 ft 4 1/8 in (1.93 m)
All values from Pro Day

=== Wichita Force ===
Pharms went undrafted in 2020, and played with the Wichita Force of the Champions Indoor Football League in 2021.

=== Pittsburgh Maulers ===
He was then drafted by Pittsburgh Maulers of the USFL in 2022, recording 22 tackles and two sacks on the year.

=== New England Patriots ===
Following the conclusion of the USFL season, Pharms signed with the New England Patriots on July 19, 2022. He was waived on August 30, and re-signed to the practice squad the next day. Pharms signed a reserve/future contract with New England on January 10, 2023.

On August 29, 2023, Pharms was waived by the Patriots and re-signed to the practice squad. He was signed to the active roster on November 4.

On February 11, 2025, Pharms signed a two-year contract extension with the Patriots. He was released on September 6, and re-signed to the practice squad. Pharms was signed to the active roster on December 27. He was waived by New England on January 3, 2026 and re-signed to the practice squad. On February 11, Pharms signed a reserve/futures contract with New England.

On August 30, 2026, Pharms was released by the Patriots as a part of final roster cuts. He was re–signed to the team's practice squad the next day.

== Personal life ==
Pharms's father Jeremiah Pharms Sr. played college football at the University of Washington, and was on the 2000 team that won the Rose Bowl.
