= Donald Payne (American football) =

American football player (born 1994)

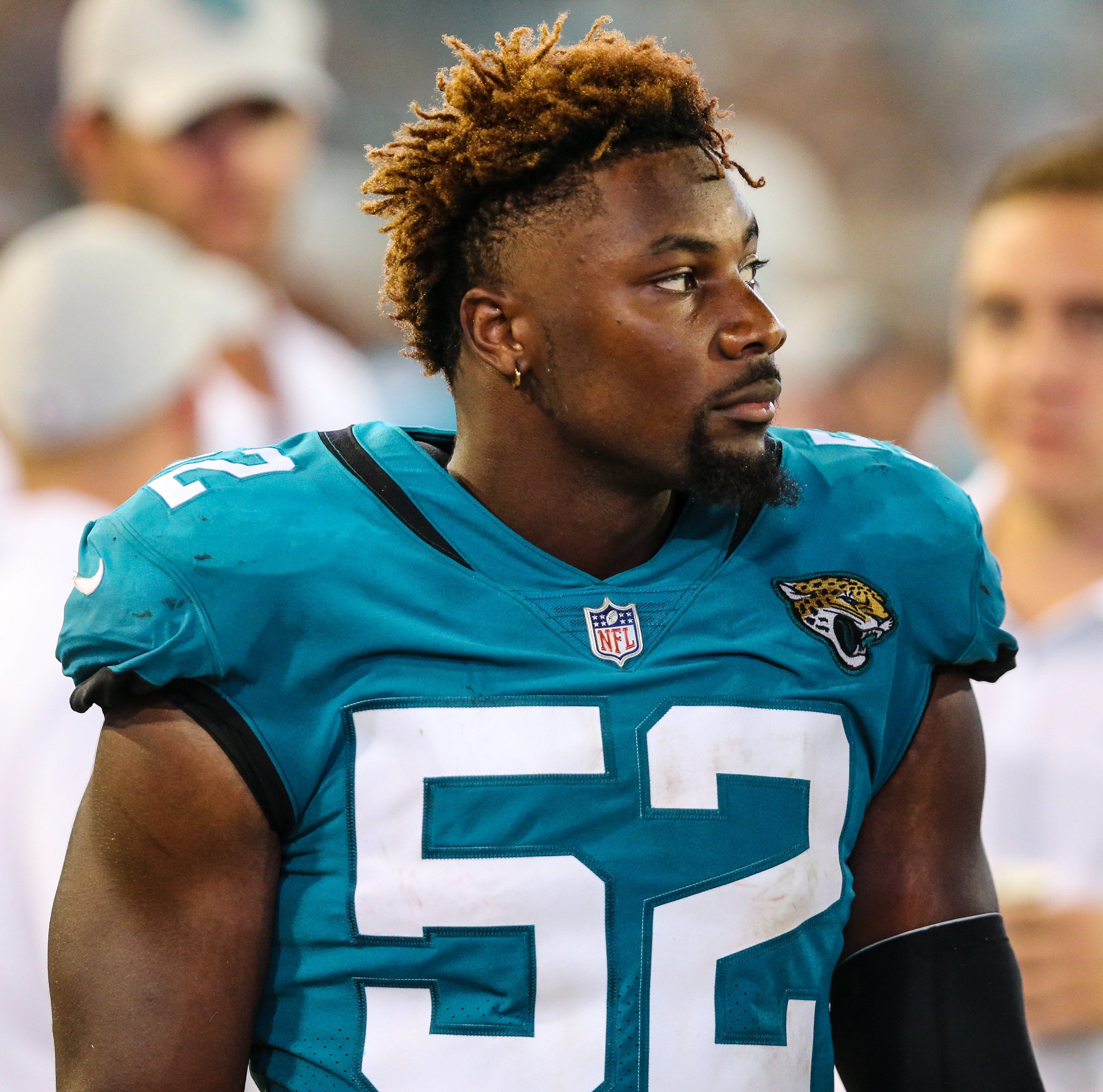
- Payne with the Jacksonville Jaguars in 2018

Profile
- Position: Linebacker

Personal information
- Born: July 12, 1994 (age 32); Fayetteville, Georgia, U.S.
- Listed height: 6 ft 0 in (1.83 m)
- Listed weight: 229 lb (104 kg)

Career information
- High school: Landmark Christian School (Fairburn, Georgia)
- College: Stetson (2012–2016)
- NFL draft: 2017: undrafted

Career history
- Baltimore Ravens (2017)*; Jacksonville Jaguars (2017–2018); Baltimore Ravens (2019)*; Jacksonville Jaguars (2019); Washington Football Team (2020)*; Miami Dolphins (2020)*; San Francisco 49ers (2021)*; Houston Gamblers (2022); Arlington / Dallas Renegades (2023–2026)
- * Offseason or practice squad member only

Awards and highlights
- XFL champion (2023); All-USFL Team (2022); USFL solo tackles leader (2022); USFL combined tackles leader (2022); 3× FCS All-American (2014–2016); 3× PFL Defensive Player of the Year (2014–2016); NCAA tackles leader (2014); Stetson University Athletics Hall of Fame (2022)

Career NFL statistics
- Total tackles: 76
- Sacks: 1.0
- Fumble recoveries: 2
- Stats at Pro Football Reference

Donald Payne (born July 12, 1994) is an American football linebacker. He played college football at Stetson and was signed by the Baltimore Ravens as an undrafted free agent in 2017 as the first player from Stetson to play in the NFL. He has also played for the Jacksonville Jaguars, Washington Football Team, Miami Dolphins, and San Francisco 49ers.

== College career ==
Payne finished his college career as a three-time All-American and a three-time Pioneer Football League Defensive Player of the Year, the first PFL athlete to win the award three times during their career. In his first season at Stetson, Payne was named the 2013 Pioneer Football League Defensive Freshman of the Year. In his sophomore season, Payne led the entire NCAA with 185 total tackles on the year and at the time tied an all-time all-division NCAA record with 30 total tackles in the win over Campbell University. Payne recorded 538 career tackles, which is the 3rd most in Division 1 history, 14 sacks and 9 interceptions during his collegiate career. Donald Payne was inducted into the Stetson University Athletics Hall of Fame on October 29, 2022.

== Professional career ==
Pre-draft measurables
Height	Weight	Arm length	Hand span	Wingspan	40-yard dash	10-yard split	20-yard split	20-yard shuttle	Three-cone drill	Vertical jump	Bench press
5 ft 11 3/4 in (1.82 m)	217 lb (98 kg)	30 3/8 in (0.77 m)	9 3/8 in (0.24 m)	6 ft 3 3/8 in (1.91 m)	4.55 s	1.55 s	2.64 s	4.35 s	6.76 s	37.5 in (0.95 m)	16 reps
All values from Pro Day

=== Baltimore Ravens (first stint) ===
Payne signed with the Baltimore Ravens as an undrafted free agent on May 5, 2017. He was waived on September 2, 2017.

=== Jacksonville Jaguars (first stint) ===
On September 3, 2017, Payne was claimed off waivers by the Jacksonville Jaguars. The Jaguars advanced all the way to the AFC Championship where they lost to the New England Patriots, 20–24. Payne finished the season third in the NFL in special teams tackles with 16. On October 25, 2018, Payne was placed on injured reserve with a knee injury. He was activated off injured reserve on December 28, 2018. On May 9, 2019, the Jaguars waived Payne.

=== Baltimore Ravens (second stint) ===
On August 16, 2019, Payne signed with the Baltimore Ravens. He was waived on August 31, 2019, and was signed to the practice squad the next day. He was released on September 10.

=== Jacksonville Jaguars (second stint) ===
On October 22, 2019, Payne was signed by the Jacksonville Jaguars. In week 13 against the Tampa Bay Buccaneers, Payne recorded a team high 13 tackles and sacked Jameis Winston once in the 28–11 win. Payne was also featured on NFL's mic'd up in week 15 vs. the Oakland Raiders. The Jaguars won 20–16, the last Raiders game ever played in the Oakland Coliseum before they relocated to Las Vegas. Payne finished the 2019 season playing in nine games (five starts) and registered 61 tackles, a sack, a pass defense and a fumble recovery.

=== Washington Football Team ===
Payne signed with the Washington Football Team on July 28, 2020. He was waived on September 5, 2020, and signed to the practice squad the next day. He was released on October 26.

=== Miami Dolphins ===
On November 11, 2020, Payne was signed to the Miami Dolphins' practice squad. He was released on November 23, 2020.

=== San Francisco 49ers ===
On August 11, 2021, Payne signed a one-year contract with the San Francisco 49ers, but was released on August 16, 2021.

=== Houston Gamblers ===
Payne was selected by the Houston Gamblers in the inaugural 2022 USFL draft. On May 31, 2022, he was named the USFL Defensive Player of the Week in Week 7. In Week 10, Payne was again named the USFL Defensive Player of the Week in the final regular season game. Payne lead the USFL in tackles with 117 tackles in 10 games. He was named to inaugural All-USFL Team Defense.

=== Arlington Renegades ===
The Arlington Renegades selected Payne in the third round of the 2023 XFL Supplemental Draft on January 1, 2023. He was placed on the team's reserve list on April 14, 2023, and activated on April 29. The Arlington Renegades defeated the D.C Defenders 35-26 in the 2023 XFL Championship Game. He re-signed with the team on January 23, 2024, and again on October 14, 2024. In week 9 of the 2025 UFL season, Payne had 7 tackles, an interception, and a pass breakup. He was awarded the UFL Defensive Player of the Week.

== Spring leagues statistics ==
Year	League	Team	Games	Tackles					Interceptions				Fumbles	
Year	League	Team	GP	Cmb	Solo	Ast	TFL	Sck	Int	Yds	Y/I	TD	FF	FR
2022	USFL	HOU	10	117	71	46	6	2.0	3	65	21.7	2	1	1
2023	XFL	ARL	8	61	22	39	5	0.5	1	0	0	0	0	0
2024	UFL	ARL	10	63	31	32	3	2.0	0	0	0	0	2	0
2025	UFL	ARL	10	66	36	30	7	0	1	4	4	0	0	0
