= 2022 USFL season =

Inaugural season of the USFL (2022)

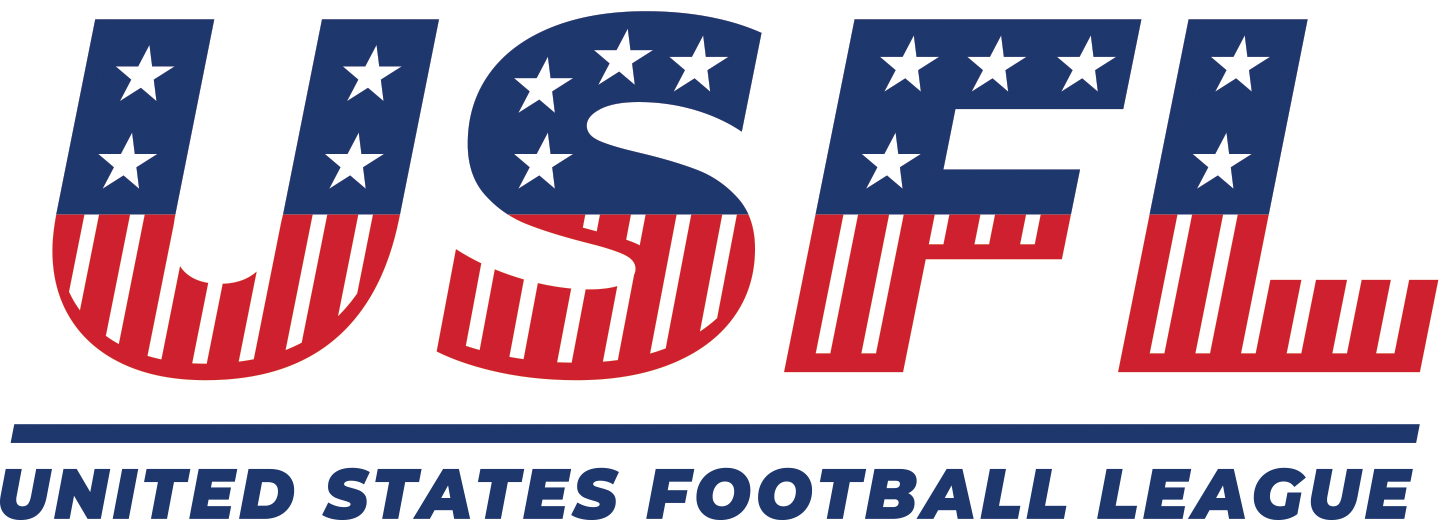
- League: United States Football League
- Sport: American football
- Duration: Regular season: April 16 – June 19; Playoffs: June 25 – July 3
- Games: 43 (40 regular-season games, 3 postseason games)
- Teams: 8
- TV partner(s): Fox, FS1, NBC, USA
- Streaming partner(s): Fox Sports app, Peacock
- Season MVP: KaVontae Turpin
- North champions: Philadelphia Stars
- North runners-up: New Jersey Generals
- South champions: Birmingham Stallions
- South runners-up: New Orleans Breakers

2022 USFL Championship
- Venue: Tom Benson Hall of Fame Stadium, Canton, Ohio
- Champions: Birmingham Stallions
- Runners-up: Philadelphia Stars
- Finals MVP: Victor Bolden Jr.

Seasons
- 2023 →

The 2022 USFL season was the inaugural season of the United States Football League, and the first season of a league using that name since 1985. The season began on April 16 and concluded on July 3. The league's eight teams represent various geographical locales and associated team names that were part of the 1984 season of the original USFL. For 2022, all regular-season games were played in Birmingham, Alabama, at Protective Stadium (Weeks 1–7, 9) and at Legion Field (Weeks 8 & 10).

The USFL played its postseason games at Tom Benson Hall of Fame Stadium, adjacent to the Pro Football Hall of Fame in Canton, Ohio. The Birmingham Stallions won the USFL Championship game against the Philadelphia Stars on July 3.

== Background ==
On June 3, 2021, The Spring League founder Brian Woods announced that he had acquired the remaining extant trademarks of the United States Football League with the intent of launching a USFL-branded league in 2022, with Fox Sports remaining as a partner in the new USFL. What was to become of The Spring League remained, at the time, an unresolved question, but according to the initial announcement TSL was to continue, probably as a scouting showcase or developmental operation. It was later reported that TSL in no longer associated with the new USFL, and Woods would later state that TSL was "no longer operational."

On October 12, 2021, Tad Snider, the executive director of the Birmingham-Jefferson Civic Center Authority, announced that the league was in serious discussions with the board of directors of the BJCC about the possibility of the USFL playing all of its games in Birmingham, Alabama. According to initial information, USFL players/staff would be housed in Birmingham during the season for an estimated economic impact of about $15 million (47,000 hotel nights), while the league would play the bubble season at Protective Stadium and Legion Field. It was speculated that the "bubble" setup would possibly continue in the league's second year, with as many as four teams playing in Birmingham and as many as four in their respective cities. The teams would then be expected to play in their own cities by Season 3.

The proposal included an eight-team 10-week season with two additional playoff rounds, from April 16 through July 3, 2022, with the broadcast proposal as follows: 25% each on Fox, NBC, FS1 and USA. Later on December 15, 2021, Fox and NBC had finalized their agreement. NBC announced that it would air nine games on NBC itself, eight on USA, and four on its streaming service Peacock.

== Location ==
Map of venues used in the USFL
1 Protective Stadium (Birmingham AL)
2 Legion Field (Birmingham AL)
3 Tom Benson Hall of Fame Stadium (Canton OH)

The city of Birmingham and the USFL announced that the city would host all eight teams. The regular-season games would be played at Protective Stadium and Legion Field.

The choice of Birmingham as the league's sole city led to substantial crowds for the Birmingham Stallions and to very small crowds for games involving only teams named after other cities and states. The opening-week matchup between the Tampa Bay Bandits and Pittsburgh Maulers, rescheduled to Monday night, was played in an almost entirely empty stadium. USA Today reported that during the Week 2 matchup between Pittsburgh and Philadelphia, crowd shots included more Fox broadcast staff members than fans.

On February 16, 2022, the league announced that the 2022 playoffs would be held in Canton, Ohio, at Tom Benson Hall of Fame Stadium instead of Birmingham due to schedule conflicts with the 2022 World Games. Playoffs were held on June 25 and July 3.

== Teams ==
The eight teams competing in the USFL's 2022 season all feature the names and colors of USFL teams that existed in 1984. During the 2022 season, all regular-season games were held at Protective Stadium (Week 1–7, 9) and Legion Field (Week 8 & 10) in Birmingham, Alabama.

Team	Head coach
North Division
Michigan Panthers	Jeff Fisher
New Jersey Generals	Mike Riley
Philadelphia Stars	Bart Andrus
Pittsburgh Maulers	Kirby Wilson
South Division
Birmingham Stallions	Skip Holtz
Houston Gamblers	Kevin Sumlin
New Orleans Breakers	Larry Fedora
Tampa Bay Bandits	Todd Haley

== Players ==
For the 2022 season, all eight carried a 38-man active roster and a seven-man practice squad (45 total). After week 5 the league announced they'll expands game-day rosters by two, total rosters by five (40/10). Contrary to other leagues, since injured players did not get paid, they were released after they got injured instead of reverting to "injured reserve list".

In May, 2022 the organization contacted players from the newly formed USFL in attempt unionize, with a petition to represent the approximately 360 USFL players was later filed at the National Labor Relations Board (NLRB). The UFPA would later join forces with the United Steelworkers as the players union representation on behalf the USFL players.

=== Compensation ===
USFL players and staff will be able to receive a college degree "tuition-free and debt-free", through a partnership with for-profit universities Strategic Education's Capella University and Strayer University. They will be able to take classes online or in-person.

USFL players receive weekly salaries of $4,500 for active roster players, $1,500 for practice squad players, and $600 during training camp, while injured players did not get paid. Players also receive bonuses of $850 per regular-season or postseason win and $10,000 for winning the championship. Players had to cover their own housing costs, but the league offered hotel rooms at a discounted price of $75 per room per day, with an option for two players to share a room.

=== Draft ===
The 2022 USFL draft occurred on February 22 and 23, 2022, and had a format similar to the 2020 XFL draft, where players were selected in phases based on positions. Michigan quarterback Shea Patterson was the first overall pick by the Michigan Panthers.

=== Player movement ===
Transactions

The USFL has instituted a standard professional football system where players who are cut by a team will be put on waivers for 24 hours. During this period, a player can be claimed by any other team. After the third regular-season game, the League based its waiver priority on inverse league standings. Players clearing waivers with no claim were released, no longer be under USFL contract, and became free agents.

- On April 1, New Jersey Generals first round draft pick Ben Holmes 2022 due to a toe injury and replaced by Luis Perez.
- On May 26, quarterback Shea Patterson was released by Michigan and claimed by New Orleans.
- On May 28, quarterback KJ Costello Stanford signed a contract with Philadelphia Stars.
- On June 2, Houston Gamblers starting quarterback Clayton Thorson was placed on the inactive list after suffering an elbow injury.

== Standings ==
North Division
#		W	L	PCT	GB	DIV	PF	PA	STK
1	(y) New Jersey Generals	9	1	.900	–	6–0	232	182	W9
2	(x) Philadelphia Stars	6	4	.600	3	4–2	262	243	L1
3	(e) Michigan Panthers	2	8	.200	7	2–4	211	236	W1
4	(e) Pittsburgh Maulers	1	9	.100	8	0–6	147	243	L5
(x)–clinched playoff berth; (y)–clinched division; (e)–eliminated from playoff contention

South Division
#		W	L	PCT	GB	DIV	PF	PA	STK
1	(y) Birmingham Stallions	9	1	.900	–	5–1	234	169	W1
2	(x) New Orleans Breakers	6	4	.600	3	3–3	196	164	L1
3	(e) Tampa Bay Bandits	4	6	.400	5	2–4	162	195	L2
4	(e) Houston Gamblers	3	7	.300	6	2–4	196	208	W2
(x)–clinched playoff berth; (y)–clinched division; (e)–eliminated from playoff contention

== Season schedule ==
The league announced in November 2021 that teams would each play a ten-game schedule, with each team facing divisional opponents twice and non-divisional opponents once. The champion and runner-up of each division will qualify for the playoffs, which will consist of two semifinal games played on June 25 and a championship game played on July 3. Most games were played on Saturdays and Sundays, with some "special broadcasts" on Fridays. On January 6, 2022, the league announced on its website that the season would begin on April 16.

The full 2022 season schedule was released March 7, 2022, with the highlights including a then-planned tripleheader of Week 1 games on Easter Sunday.

=== Regular season ===
All games at Protective Stadium during Weeks 1–7 and 9, and at Legion Field during weeks 8 and 10. All times listed are ET. All games on NBC are simulcast on Peacock.

Changes to game schedules or broadcasting are listed in notes after each week's matchups.

All matchups will be officially announced by the league no later than 2 weeks ahead of game time and may be flexed from cable to broadcast if needed.

The playoff bracket was set after the Week 9 contests, rendering Week 10's games to be effectively exhibition games. In an effort to avoid tanking, the USFL declared that the two lowest-ranked teams—both coincidentally set to play each other that day—would be playing for the rights to the first overall pick in the 2023 USFL draft, with the winner receiving that selection.

==== Week 1 ====
Week 1
Date and time	Away team	Score	Home team	Broadcast			Refs
Date and time	Away team	Score	Home team	Network	Viewership (millions)	Rating	Refs
April 16, 7:30 p.m.	New Jersey Generals	24–28	Birmingham Stallions	Fox and NBC	3.07	1.8	
April 17, 12:50 p.m.	Houston Gamblers	17–12	Michigan Panthers	NBC (Note: Game originally scheduled for 12 pm ET start but delayed due to weather.)	2.15	1.1	
April 17, 5:00 p.m.	Philadelphia Stars	17–23	New Orleans Breakers	USA (Note: Game originally scheduled for 4 pm ET start but delayed due to earlier game being delayed.)	0.77	0.4	
April 18, 7:00 p.m.	Tampa Bay Bandits	17–3	Pittsburgh Maulers	FS1 (Note: Game originally scheduled for 8 pm ET start on April 17 but rescheduled to April 18 due to earlier game delays and weather risk.)	0.27	0.2	

==== Week 2 ====
Week 2
Date and time	Away team	Score	Home team	Broadcast			Refs
Date and time	Away team	Score	Home team	Network	Viewership (millions)	Rating	Refs
April 22, 8:00 p.m.	Michigan Panthers	6–10	New Jersey Generals	USA	0.36	0.2	
April 23, 12:00 p.m.	Pittsburgh Maulers	23–30	Philadelphia Stars	Fox	1.06	0.7	
April 23, 7:00 p.m.	Birmingham Stallions	33–28	Houston Gamblers	FS1 (Note: Game started on FS2 due to MLB coverage on FS1.)	0.42	0.2	
April 24, 3:00 p.m.	New Orleans Breakers	34–3	Tampa Bay Bandits	NBC	0.81	0.5	

==== Week 3 ====
Week 3
Date and time	Away team	Score	Home team	Broadcast			Refs
Date and time	Away team	Score	Home team	Network	Viewership (millions)	Rating	Refs
April 30, 4:00 p.m.	Tampa Bay Bandits	27–26	Houston Gamblers	Fox	0.83	0.5	
April 30, 8:00 p.m.	Birmingham Stallions	22–13	New Orleans Breakers	Fox (Note: The Stallions–Breakers game was moved to Saturday night (with coverage by Fox) with a corresponding move of the Maulers–Panthers to Sunday afternoon (with coverage by USA), part of an effort by the league to air "some of its better games on network television.")	1.11	0.7	
May 1, 2:30 p.m.	Pittsburgh Maulers	0–24	Michigan Panthers	USA	0.29	0.2	
May 1, 8:00 p.m.	New Jersey Generals	24–16	Philadelphia Stars	Peacock	N/A		

==== Week 4 ====
Week 4
Date and time	Away team	Score	Home team	Broadcast			Refs
Date and time	Away team	Score	Home team	Network	Viewership (millions)	Rating	Refs
May 6, 10:20 p.m.	Philadelphia Stars	26–25	Michigan Panthers	FS1	0.21	0.1	
May 7, 2:30 p.m.	New Jersey Generals	21–13	Pittsburgh Maulers	Peacock	N/A		
May 7, 7:00 p.m.	Tampa Bay Bandits	10–16	Birmingham Stallions	Fox	1.05	0.6	
May 8, 3:00 p.m.	Houston Gamblers	16–23	New Orleans Breakers	NBC	1.16	0.7	

==== Week 5 ====
Week 5
Date and time	Away team	Score	Home team	Broadcast			Refs
Date and time	Away team	Score	Home team	Network	Viewership (millions)	Rating	Refs
May 13, 8:00 p.m.	Michigan Panthers	20–27	Tampa Bay Bandits	USA	0.25	0.2	
May 14, 3:00 p.m.	New Orleans Breakers	17–27	New Jersey Generals	Fox	0.72	0.5	
May 15, 12:00 p.m.	Birmingham Stallions	30–17	Philadelphia Stars	NBC	0.91	0.6	
May 15, 4:00 p.m.	Pittsburgh Maulers	21–20	Houston Gamblers	Fox	0.69	0.4	

==== Week 6 ====
Week 6
Date and time	Away team	Score	Home team	Broadcast			Refs
Date and time	Away team	Score	Home team	Network	Viewership (millions)	Rating	Refs
May 21, 1:00 p.m.	Tampa Bay Bandits	28–35	Philadelphia Stars	NBC (Note: Game concluded on CNBC due to live airing of Saturday Night Live on NBC.)	0.79	0.5	
May 21, 7:30 p.m.	Michigan Panthers	17–33	Birmingham Stallions	NBC	1.20	0.7	
May 22, 12:00 p.m.	Pittsburgh Maulers	16–26	New Orleans Breakers	FS1	0.28	0.2	
May 22, 4:00 p.m.	Houston Gamblers	25–26	New Jersey Generals	Fox	0.67	0.4	

==== Week 7 ====
Week 7
Date and time	Away team	Score	Home team	Broadcast			Refs
Date and time	Away team	Score	Home team	Network	Viewership (millions)	Rating	Refs
May 28, 12:00 p.m.	New Jersey Generals	20–13	Tampa Bay Bandits	USA	0.23	0.2	
May 28, 9:00 p.m.	New Orleans Breakers	31–27 (OT)	Michigan Panthers	FS1	0.27	0.2	
May 29, 2:00 p.m.	Birmingham Stallions	26–16	Pittsburgh Maulers	Fox	0.83	0.5	
May 29, 6:00 p.m.	Philadelphia Stars	35–24	Houston Gamblers	Peacock	N/A		

==== Week 8 ====
Week 8
Date and time	Away team	Score	Home team	Broadcast			Refs
Date and time	Away team	Score	Home team	Network	Viewership (millions)	Rating	Refs
June 3, 8:00 p.m.	Pittsburgh Maulers	18–29	New Jersey Generals	USA	0.21	0.1	
June 4, 3:00 p.m.	New Orleans Breakers	9–10	Birmingham Stallions	Fox	0.63	0.4	
June 5, 12:00 p.m.	Michigan Panthers	24–46	Philadelphia Stars	Fox	0.77	0.5	
June 5, 4:00 p.m.	Houston Gamblers	3–13	Tampa Bay Bandits	Peacock	N/A		

==== Week 9 ====
Week 9
Date and time	Away team	Score	Home team	Broadcast			Refs
Date and time	Away team	Score	Home team	Network	Viewership (millions)	Rating	Refs
June 11, 1:00 p.m.	New Jersey Generals	25–23	Michigan Panthers	NBC	0.82	0.5	
June 11, 6:00 p.m.	Houston Gamblers	17–15	Birmingham Stallions	USA	0.21	0.2	
June 12, 4:00 p.m.	Tampa Bay Bandits	6–17	New Orleans Breakers	Fox	0.74	0.5	
June 12, 7:30 p.m.	Philadelphia Stars	17–16	Pittsburgh Maulers	FS1	0.39	0.2	

==== Week 10 ====
Week 10
Date and time	Away team	Score	Home team	Broadcast			Refs
Date and time	Away team	Score	Home team	Network	Viewership (millions)	Rating	Refs
June 18, 12:00 p.m.	Philadelphia Stars	23–26	New Jersey Generals	USA	0.24	0.2	
June 18, 4:00 p.m.	Birmingham Stallions	21–18	Tampa Bay Bandits	Fox	0.65	0.4	
June 19, 12:00 p.m.	Michigan Panthers	33–21	Pittsburgh Maulers	USA	0.28	0.2	
June 19, 8:30 p.m.	New Orleans Breakers	3–20	Houston Gamblers	FS1	0.18	0.1	

=== Playoffs ===
The playoffs started on June 25 and ended with the championship game on July 3. All games were played at Tom Benson Hall of Fame Stadium.

Division Finals; June 25, 2022
N1	New Jersey Generals	14
N2	Philadelphia Stars	19
S1	Birmingham Stallions	31
S2	New Orleans Breakers	17

USFL Championship; July 3, 2022
N2	Philadelphia Stars	30
S1	Birmingham Stallions	33

Division Finals
Date and time	Away team	Score	Home team	Broadcast			Refs
Date and time	Away team	Score	Home team	Network	Viewership (millions)	Rating	Refs
June 25, 3:00 p.m.	Philadelphia Stars	19–14	New Jersey Generals	Fox	0.96	0.6	
June 25, 8:00 p.m.	New Orleans Breakers	17–31	Birmingham Stallions	NBC	1.00	0.7	

USFL Championship
Date and time	Away team	Score	Home team	Broadcast			Refs
Date and time	Away team	Score	Home team	Network	Viewership (millions)	Rating	Refs
July 3, 7:30 p.m.	Philadelphia Stars	30–33	Birmingham Stallions	Fox	1.52	0.9	

== Awards ==
=== Players of the Week ===
The following Players of the Week were named the top performers (by the fans voting in a poll) during the 2022 season:

Week	Offensive Player of the Week	Defensive Player of the Week	Special Teams Player of the Week	Ref.
1	QB J'Mar Smith (Birmingham Stallions)	DE Davin Bellamy (New Orleans Breakers)	KR Chad Williams (New Orleans Breakers)	
2	QB Kyle Sloter (1) (New Orleans Breakers)	LB Vontae Diggs (New Orleans Breakers)	K Nick Vogel (Houston Gamblers)	
3	WR Johnnie Dixon (New Orleans Breakers)	LB DeMarquis Gates (Birmingham Stallions)	K Tyler Rausa (Tampa Bay Bandits)	
4	RB Reggie Corbin (Michigan Panthers)	LB Scooby Wright (Birmingham Stallions)	K Taylor Bertolet (New Orleans Breakers)	
5	RB C. J. Marable (Birmingham Stallions)	LB Demarquis Gates (Birmingham Stallions)	K Ramiz Ahmed (Pittsburgh Maulers)	
6	RB Bo Scarbrough (Birmingham Stallions)	S JoJo Tillery (Birmingham Stallions)	K Cole Murphy (1) (Michigan Panthers)	
7	QB Kyle Sloter (2) (New Orleans Breakers)	LB Donald Payne (1) (Houston Gamblers)	K Cole Murphy (2) (Michigan Panthers)	
8	QB Case Cookus (Philadelphia Stars)	DE Chris Odom (Houston Gamblers)	K Ramiz Ahmed (Pittsburgh Maulers)	
9	WR Joe Walker (Michigan Panthers)	CB Trae Elston (New Jersey Generals)	P Max Duffy (Pittsburgh Maulers)	
10	QB Paxton Lynch (Michigan Panthers)	LB Donald Payne (2) (Houston Gamblers)	DE Chris Odom (Houston Gamblers)	

=== All-USFL Team ===
The following 27 players were selected by the league as "athletes who played consistently well over the course of the season".

==== Offense ====
Position	Player(s)
Quarterback	10 Kyle Sloter, New Orleans Breakers
Running back	27 Darius Victor, New Jersey Generals; 3 Reggie Corbin, Michigan Panthers
Wide receiver	7 Victor Bolden Jr., Birmingham Stallions; 5 KaVontae Turpin, New Jersey Generals
Tight end	80 Sal Cannella, New Orleans Breakers
Offensive tackle	72 Terry Poole, New Jersey Generals; 77 Jarron Jones, Tampa Bay Bandits
Guard	78 Cameron Hunt, Birmingham Stallions^{[b]} 51 Garrett McGhin, New Jersey Generals
Center	65 Jared Thomas, New Orleans Breakers

==== Defense ====
Position	Player(s)
Defensive end	93 Chris Odom, Houston Gamblers; 56 Davin Bellamy, New Orleans Breakers
Defensive tackle	70 Reggie Howard Jr., New Orleans Breakers; 90 Toby Johnson, New Jersey Generals
Linebacker	47 DeMarquis Gates, Birmingham Stallions; 15 Donald Payne, Houston Gamblers; 45 Jerod Fernandez, New Orleans Breakers
Cornerback	8 Channing Stribling, Philadelphia Stars; 4 William Likely, Houston Gamblers
Safety	25 Shalom Luani, New Jersey Generals; 22 Bryce Torneden, Pittsburgh Maulers

==== Special teams ====
Position	Player(s)
Kicker	10 Brandon Aubrey, Birmingham Stallions
Punter	16 Brandon Wright, Tampa Bay Bandits
Kickoff returner	13 Maurice Alexander, Philadelphia Stars
Punt returner	5 KaVontae Turpin, New Jersey Generals
Special teamer	7 Victor Bolden Jr., Birmingham Stallions

=== Regular season ===
Most Valuable Player of the Year	Offensive Player of the Year	Defensive Player of the Year	Coach of the Year	Sportsman Player of the Year	Ref.
KaVontae Turpin WR (New Jersey Generals)	Darius Victor RB (New Jersey Generals)	Chris Odom DE (Houston Gamblers)	Mike Riley (New Jersey Generals)	Matt Colburn RB (Philadelphia Stars)	

=== Playoffs ===
North Division Final Player of the game	South Division Final Player of the game	USFL Championship Most Valuable Player/Player of the game
Maurice Alexander WR (Philadelphia Stars)	J'Mar Smith QB (Birmingham Stallions)	Victor Bolden Jr. WR (Birmingham Stallions)

== Statistical leaders ==
2022 USFL statistical leaders
Category		Player	Team	Stat
Offense
Passing	Yards	Jordan Ta'amu	Tampa Bay Bandits	2,015
Passing	Touchdowns	Jordan Ta'amu	Tampa Bay Bandits	14
Passing	Interceptions	Jordan Ta'amu	Tampa Bay Bandits	12
Rushing	Yards	Jordan Ellis	New Orleans Breakers	596
Rushing	Touchdowns	Darius Victor	New Jersey Generals	9
Receiving	Yards	KaVontae Turpin	New Jersey Generals	540
Receiving	Receptions	Lance Lenoir	Michigan Panthers	52
Receiving	Touchdowns	Isaiah Zuber	Houston Gamblers	5
Defense
Tackles		Donald Payne	Houston Gamblers	117
Sacks		Chris Odom	Houston Gamblers	12.5
Interceptions		Channing Stribling	Philadelphia Stars	7
Passes Defensed		De'Vante Bausby	New Jersey Generals	15
Special teams
Return yards	Kick	Maurice Alexander	Philadelphia Stars	787
Return yards	Punt	Rashard Davis	Tampa Bay Bandits	224
Field goals	Made	Brandon Aubrey	Birmingham Stallions	18
Field goals	Percentage	Cole Murphy	Michigan Panthers	92%
Punting	Yards	Brandon Wright	Tampa Bay Bandits	2,176
Punting	Average	Brandon Wright	Tampa Bay Bandits	41.1

== League finances ==
Fox Sports owns the league and has reportedly committed $150 million–$200 million over three years to its operations, with plans to attract an additional $250 million from investors. For the 2022 regular season, tickets cost $10 per person, with children aged 15 and under free. However, for the 2 division finals games tickets will cost $15 per person with children aged 15 and under $5, for the championship game those prices are increased by $5 (meaning $20 per person and $10 for children 15 and under) Tickets provide access to all games scheduled for the same day. On March 3, 2022, the league announced that 15 states have approved legal, regulated betting on USFL games.

On February 15, 2022, the USFL signed a multi-year partnership with Sportradar, making them the official sports data partner of the league. Sportradar will also provide betting data during USFL telecasts.

The league draws revenue of less than $10 million, making it ineligible to seek P visas for players from outside the United States; Liam Dobson, a Canadian offensive lineman, was disqualified from playing in the USFL because of the league's lack of revenue. It would later reported that the league estimated annual revenue is around $7.5 million.

== Media ==
=== Broadcasting ===
This was the first year of the three-year rights deal agreement between NBC Sports along with Fox Sports (Fox Does not have to pay a rights free due to it being one of the owners of the league).

Telecasts for the 2022 season will air on Fox, FS1, NBC, Peacock and USA Network, Fox broadcast 13 regular season games (1 simulcast with NBC), 1 semi-final, and the championship game this season (on a two year rotation with NBC). NBC broadcast 8 regular season games (1 simulcast with Fox) and 1 semi-final. Peacock broadcast 4 games exclusively and simulcast all NBC games (including the opening game simulcast with Fox and NBC). Other games aired on Cable networks USA Network (9 games) and FS1 (7 games).

The opening game was broadcast on April 16, 2022, at 7:30 PM Eastern time on both Fox and NBC. Fox produced the game and NBC produced all studio coverage. It was the first football game to be simulcast across two major American broadcast networks since the 2007 New England Patriots–New York Giants game.

Fox brought back its lead XFL broadcast team from 2020, Curt Menefee and Joel Klatt, for USFL coverage. Kevin Kugler and Mark Sanchez serve as the second broadcast team. Brock Huard reports from the sidelines during selected games.

The NBC crew features Jac Collinsworth and Paul Burmeister handling play-by-play duties alongside analysts Jason Garrett, Michael Robinson and Cameron Jordan. Zora Stephenson and Corey Robinson are sideline reporters and Sara Perlman hosts halftime and post-game coverage.

==== Viewership ====
In millions of viewers

Broadcaster	1	2	3	4	5	6	7	8	9	10	Division finals	Championship game	Total	Average
Fox	1.8	1.1	0.8	1.1	0.7	0.7	0.8	0.6	0.7	0.7	1.0	1.5	14.1	0.9
Fox	–	–	1.1	–	0.7	–	–	0.8	–	–	–	–	14.1	0.9
FS1	0.3	0.4	–	0.2	–	0.3	0.3	–	0.4	0.2	–	–	2.1	0.3
NBC	1.3	0.8	–	1.1	0.9	0.8	–	–	0.8	–	1.0	–	10.1	1.1
NBC	2.2	–	–	–	–	1.2	–	–	–	–	–	–	10.1	1.1
USA	0.8	0.4	0.3	–	0.3	–	0.2	0.2	0.2	0.2	–	–	2.9	0.3
USA	–	–	–	–	–	–	–	–	–	0.3	–	–	2.9	0.3
Total	5.4	2.7	2.2	2.4	2.6	3.0	1.3	1.6	2.1	1.4	2.0	1.5	28.2	
Average	1.1	0.6	0.7	0.8	0.6	0.7	0.4	0.5	0.5	0.3	1.0	1.5		0.7

* One decimal place is shown in table but three decimal places are used in all calculations.
* Viewership figures for games streaming on Peacock were not released.

=== United By Football ===
During the season, Fox also aired a 13-part documentary series called "United by Football: A Season in the USFL" which produced by the league, NFL Films and Fox Sports. The series followed the USFL players and coaches "behind-the-scenes" during their 2022 journey, starting with the inaugural USFL Player Draft in Birmingham, and conclude with the USFL Championship game. The series averaged 720,000 viewers per episode.

The show caused controversy before the first week, as a video clip, posted on social media, of Pittsburgh Maulers head coach Kirby Wilson releasing running back De'Veon Smith due to violating team protocol after asking to have pizza for lunch instead of the chicken salad.

== Viewership and Reception ==
The first week of games received mixed reviews. Although 3.07 million viewers tuning in for the league first game and 2.15 million for the second and the level of play was good, some criticized the first game simulcasting and especially the camera angles and drones shots, while others praised the helmet cam and sideline access. The viewership dropped 57% in the second week, while numbers continue to decline throughout the season with a season low of 337,500 average for the final week. Regular season averaged 695,000 viewers per game. The USFL Championship Game averaged a 0.9 rating and 1.52 million viewers on FOX, and was the league's highest rated and most-watched telecast since week 1.

The USFL experimented by putting sensors in game balls to measure first downs. This experience cause an issue during week 1, with poor passing attempts and kicking performance for punts, field goals, and extra points, given the distribution of the extra weight of the sensor. The league changed kicking balls before Week 2.

Many were concerned about the attendance figures in the hub setting in Birmingham for non-Stallions games. While the league started strong with 17,500 fans in attendance for the first game, featuring the local Stallions vs New Jersey Generals, but they did not release figures for the other 39 regular-season games, which appeared to be played in a mostly-empty stadium. The poor attendance and the league's inability to connect with fans in most of their city-named teams' markets, believed to hurt league image and credibility amongst casual and mainstream football fans. The USFL acknowledged the issue, and promised to play next season in two to four cities, and the USFL parent company, Fox, hired investment bank Allen & Company to find minority investors to help fund the league's expansion into local markets.

== Signees to the NFL ==
=== Players ===
After the season over 180 players got invited to NFL tryouts, 69 players were invited to NFL training camps and 13 players finished the 2022/23 season on active 53-man NFL rosters.

Legend
	Made an NFL team (active, practice squad or PUP)
**Bold**	Made the active roster

Note the following list notes the status of players only during the 2022 NFL season.

Player	Position	USFL team	NFL team(s)	Ref.
Christian Sam	LB	New Orleans Breakers	Dallas Cowboys	
DeJuan Neal	CB	New Jersey Generals	Washington Commanders	
Channing Stribling	CB	Philadelphia Stars	Washington Commanders	
Doug Costin	DT	Birmingham Stallions	Pittsburgh Steelers	
**Jeremiah Pharms**	DT	Pittsburgh Maulers	New England Patriots	
Isaiah Zuber	WR	Houston Gamblers	Las Vegas Raiders	
Isiah Brown	CB	New Orleans Breakers	Las Vegas Raiders	
Sal Cannella	TE	New Orleans Breakers	Green Bay Packers	
Carlo Kemp	DT	Pittsburgh Maulers	Los Angeles Chargers	
Victor Bolden Jr.	WR	Birmingham Stallions	Arizona Cardinals/Denver Broncos	
Luis Perez	QB	New Jersey Generals	Los Angeles Rams	
Kyle Sloter	QB	New Orleans Breakers	Jacksonville Jaguars	
**Domenique Davis**	DT	Houston Gamblers	Cincinnati Bengals	
Tegray Scales	LB	Houston Gamblers	Cincinnati Bengals	
Osirus Mitchell	WR	Birmingham Stallions	Green Bay Packers	
Rashard Davis	WR	Tampa Bay Bandits	New York Jets	
Tino Ellis	CB	Michigan Panthers	Miami Dolphins	
Lance Lenoir	WR	Michigan Panthers	Philadelphia Eagles/Los Angeles Rams	
Bailey Gaither	WR	Pittsburgh Maulers	Baltimore Ravens/New York Giants	
Garrett McGhin	OG	New Jersey Generals	New York Giants	
Ishmael Hyman	WR	Michigan Panthers	Green Bay Packers	
**KaVontae Turpin**	WR	New Jersey Generals	Dallas Cowboys	
Bug Howard	TE	Philadelphia Stars	Tampa Bay Buccaneers	
Darrin Paulo	OT	Tampa Bay Bandits	Detroit Lions	
Shakur Brown	CB	Pittsburgh Maulers	Tennessee Titans	
Tomasi Laulile	DT	Houston Gamblers	San Francisco 49ers	
**Alex Akingbulu**	OT	Philadelphia Stars	Washington Commanders	
Sage Surratt	TE	Birmingham Stallions	Los Angeles Chargers	
Derrick Dillon	WR	Tampa Bay Bandits	Cleveland Browns	
**Maurice Alexander**	WR	Philadelphia Stars	Detroit Lions	
Terrell Bonds	CB	Pittsburgh Maulers	Tennessee Titans	
De'Vante Bausby	CB	New Jersey Generals	Washington Commanders	
Darrius Shepherd	WR	New Jersey Generals	Denver Broncos	
**Tae Hayes**	CB	Birmingham Stallions	Carolina Panthers/New England Patriots	
Chris Odom	DE	Houston Gamblers	Cleveland Browns	
**DeMarquis Gates**	LB	Birmingham Stallions	Chicago Bears	
Quenton Meeks	CB	Tampa Bay Bandits	New Orleans Saints	
Devin Gray	WR	Philadelphia Stars	Kansas City Chiefs	
Matt Colburn	RB	Philadelphia Stars	Jacksonville Jaguars	
Cameron Hunt	OG	Birmingham Stallions	Los Angeles Chargers	
**T. J. Carter**	DE	Michigan Panthers	New Orleans Saints	
Jameson Houston	CB	Michigan Panthers	Seattle Seahawks	
**Micah Abernathy**	S	Houston Gamblers	Green Bay Packers/Atlanta Falcons	
Dexter Williams	RB	Philadelphia Stars	Green Bay Packers	
KJ Costello	QB	Philadelphia Stars	New Orleans Saints	
B. J. Emmons	RB	Tampa Bay Bandits	Houston Texans	
Stevie Scott	RB	Michigan Panthers	Denver Broncos	
Brian Allen	CB	Birmingham Stallions	New Orleans Saints	
DeAndre Torrey	RB	Michigan Panthers	Philadelphia Eagles	
Ramiz Ahmed	K	Pittsburgh Maulers	Green Bay Packers	
Devin Hafford	CB	Pittsburgh Maulers	New England Patriots	
Taylor Bertolet	K	New Orleans Breakers	Carolina Panthers/Los Angeles Chargers	
**Tucker Addington**	LS	Houston Gamblers	Dallas Cowboys/New England Patriots	
**Mitchell Fraboni**	LS	Pittsburgh Maulers	Denver Broncos	
Hunter Thedford	TE/OL	Pittsburgh Maulers	New England Patriots/Denver Broncos	
Case Cookus	QB	Philadelphia Stars	Los Angeles Rams	
Brock Miller	P	New Jersey Generals	Los Angeles Rams	

=== Officials ===
After the season 48 USFL officials participated in the NFL Officiating Development Program and nine of them were selected to officiate games for the 2023 NFL season.
