= 2022 Houston Gamblers season =

American professional football season

- General manager: Kevin Sumlin
- Head coach: Kevin Sumlin
- Home stadium: None

Results
- Record: 3–7
- League place: 4th in South Division
- Playoffs: Did not qualify

The 2022 Houston Gamblers season was the first season for the Houston Gamblers as a professional American football franchise. They played as charter members of the United States Football League, one of eight teams to compete in the league for the 2022 season. The Gamblers technically played as a traveling team (since the entirety of the regular season was played at Protective Stadium and Legion Field in Birmingham, Alabama) and were led by head coach Kevin Sumlin.

== Background and history ==
As is the case with all eight teams competing in the league, the Houston Gamblers take their name and color scheme from a franchise of the same name that competed in the original USFL. The original Houston Gamblers, who competed in the USFL from 1984 to 1985, finished with a winning record in both of their seasons, and won one Western Conference championship. They were led by head coach Jack Pardee for the duration of their existence.

The identical team names were the subject of a lawsuit brought to Fox by the owners of the original USFL, who claimed trademark infringement and false advertising on the part of the new league.

== Final roster ==
2022 Houston Gamblers roster
Quarterbacks (QB): 11 Kenji Bahar; 3 Terry Wilson; Running backs (RB): 29 Benny LeMay; 7 Mark Thompson; 12 Devwah Whaley; Wide receivers (WR): 16 Tyler Palka; 17 Anthony Ratliff-Williams; 14 Teo Redding; 23 JoJo Ward; 1 Isaiah Zuber; Tight ends (TE): 86 Julian Allen; 8 Brandon Barnes	Offensive linemen (OL): 66 Nick Buchanan C; 74 Avery Gennesy T; 77 Tyler Higby G; 78 Brandon Hitner T; 70 Terronne Prescod G; 60 Kristjan Sokoli G/C; 55 John Yarbrough G/T; Defensive linemen (DL): 52 Domenique Davis DT; 99 Ahmad Gooden DE; 90 Joey Ivie DT; 94 Tomasi Laulile DT; 93 Chris Odom DE; 91 Cory Thomas DT	Linebackers (LB): 50 Drequan Brown; 20 Drew Lewis; 5 Reggie Northrup; 15 Donald Payne; 44 Tegray Scales; Defensive backs (DB): 32 Micah Abernathy S; 33 Alijah Holder S; 24 Jeremiah Johnson CB; 27 Bydarrius Knighten CB; 4 Will Likely CB; 9 Andrew Soroh S; 21 Jamar Summers CB; Special teams (ST): 38 Tucker Addington LS; 13 Drew Galitz P; 19 Nick Vogel K	Practice squad: 57 Andrew Ankrah DE; 42 Beniquez Brown ILB; 51 Erick Browne G; 31 Jerry Cantave CB; 40 Isaiah Chambers DE; 2 Dalyn Dawkins RB; 92 Ike Onwuasoanya DT; 85 Josh Pederson TE; 10 Tyler Simmons WR; 75 Braxton Webb T; Reserve: 22 Manny Bunch S (IR); 18 Clayton Thorson QB (IR); -- Brandon Williams CB Retired; Rookies in italics 40 active, 3 reserve, 10 practice squad

The Gamblers, like all other teams, have a 38-man active roster with a 7-man practice squad. Their first picks in the 2022 USFL draft included quarterback Clayton Thorson (round 1, pick 5), defensive end Chris Odom (round 2, pick 12), and offensive tackle Ahmad Gooden.

== Staff ==
The Gamblers' first head coach and general manager is Kevin Sumlin, who most recently served as the head coach at Houston, Texas A&M, and Arizona. The team's offense will be headed by two co-coordinators, J. D. Runnels and David Beaty. Runnels comes to the USFL with four years of playing experience in the National Football League and most recently spend one year as the running backs coach at East Central College. Beaty joins the team having most recently served as a consultant at Texas, before which he spent four years as the head coach at Kansas. The defense will be led by Tim Lewis, a former first-round NFL draft pick who played in the league for four seasons before starting his coaching career and has since served as an assistant at the high school, college, and professional ranks (including the NFL and XFL) and as the head coach of the Birmingham Iron of the Alliance of American Football.

2022 Houston Gamblers staff
Front office: General manager – Kevin Sumlin; Head coaches: Head coach – Kevin Sumlin; Offensive coaches: Co-Offensive Coordinator/Running backs – J. D. Runnels; Co-Offensive Coordinator/Wide receivers – David Beaty; Tight ends/Special teams – Greg McMahon; Offensive line – Gordon Shaw	Defensive coaches: Defensive coordinator – Tim Lewis; Defensive line – Ty Warren; Linebackers – Mark Snyder

== Schedule ==
=== Regular season ===
The Gamblers' 2022 schedule was announced on March 7. They opened the season against the Michigan Panthers. Because the regular season is being held in its entirety at Protective Stadium and Legion Field in Birmingham, Alabama, the Gamblers would technically play all of their games as a traveling team. The schedule format has each team playing a ten-game regular season, consisting of two games against each division opponent and one game against each team in the opposite division.

Week	Date	Time (ET)	Opponent	Result	Record	TV	Recap
1	April 17	12:50 p.m.	Michigan Panthers	**W** 17–12	1–0	NBC/Peacock	Recap
2	April 23	7:00 p.m.	**Birmingham Stallions***	**L** 28–33	1–1	FS1	Recap
3	April 30	4:00 p.m.	**Tampa Bay Bandits***	**L** 26–27	1–2	Fox	Recap
4	May 8	3:00 p.m.	**New Orleans Breakers**	**L** 16–23	1–3	NBC/Peacock	Recap
5	May 15	4:00 p.m.	Pittsburgh Maulers*	**L** 20–21	1–4	Fox	Recap
6	May 22	4:00 p.m.	New Jersey Generals	**L** 25–26	1–5	Fox	Recap
7	May 29	6:00 p.m.	Philadelphia Stars*	**L** 24–35	1–6	Peacock	Recap
8	June 5	4:00 p.m.	**Tampa Bay Bandits**	**L** 3–13	1–7	Peacock	Recap
9	June 11	6:00 p.m.	**Birmingham Stallions**	**W** 17–15	2–7	USA	Recap
10	June 19	8:30 p.m.	**New Orleans Breakers***	**W** 20–3	3–7	FS1	Recap

Note: Intra-division opponents are in bold text. * mean that they host the game, since all eight teams play at the same stadium

=== Game summaries ===
==== Week 1: at Michigan Panthers ====
Week 1: Houston Gamblers at Michigan Panthers – Game summary

Quarter	1	2	3	4	Total
**Gamblers**	3	14	0	0	**17**
Panthers	0	0	6	6	**12**

at Protective Stadium, Birmingham, Alabama

- Date: April 17
- Game time: 12:50 p.m. (delayed)
- Referee: Bryan Banks
- TV announcers (NBC/Peacock): Jac Collinsworth, Jason Garrett, Lewis Johnson

Game information

**First quarter**

- HOU – Nick Vogel 37-yard field goal, 7:07. Houston 3–0. **Drive: 9 plays, 29 yards, 3:32.**

**Second quarter**

- HOU – Reggie Northrop 13-yard fumble return (Dalyn Dawkins rush), 15:00. Houston 11–0.
- HOU – Isaiah Zuber 12-yard pass from Clayton Thorson (Dalyn Dawkins rush failed), 5:08. Houston 17–0. **Drive: 6 plays, 65 yards, 3:00.**

**Third quarter**

- MICH – Lance Lenoir 8-yard pass from Shea Patterson (Shea Patterson pass failed), 9:42. Houston 17–6. **Drive: 10 plays, 74 yards, 5:25.**

**Fourth quarter**

- MICH – Stevie Scott III 3-yard rush (Stevie Scott III rush failed), 10:20. Houston 17–12. **Drive: 9 plays, 66 yards, 4:01.**

**Top passers**

- HOU – Clayton Thorson – 9/17, 73 yards, TD, INT
- MICH – Shea Patterson – 17/25, 192 yards, TD

**Top rushers**

- HOU – Mark Thompson – 13 rushes, 71 yards
- MICH – Stevie Scott III – 18 rushes, 72 yards, TD

**Top receivers**

- HOU – JoJo Ward – 7 receptions, 48 yards
- MICH – Lance Lenoir – 6 receptions, 71 yards, TD

The Gamblers started their season against the Michigan Panthers. The Gamblers scored the only points of the first quarter on a 37-yard field goal by Nick Vogel. In the first play of the second quarter, the Panthers were poised to score the first touchdown before a Shea Patterson fumble was returned 90 yards for a touchdown by Reggie Northrop which, after a successful 2-point conversion, put the Gamblers up 11–0. The Panthers forced a Gamblers 3 and out, and on the ensuing punt, returned the punt 40 yards for touchdown. However, an unnecessary roughness call on the Panthers negated the touchdown, putting them on their own 45 yard line. The Gamblers stretched out their lead with a 65-yard drive topped off by an Isaiah Zuber 12-yard touchdown reception, putting the Gamblers up 17–0 after a failed 2-point conversion. The Gamblers had a chance to go up 20–0 with a 27-yard field goal, but it was missed.

We came out hot, on fire. We executed that first half. Second half, it got a little rocky. We had to get back, get our mindset right. A win is a win.

— Reggie Northrup, April 17, 2022, Fox Sports

The Panthers came out strong after halftime, driving for a touchdown, keeping the Gamblers up 2 scores after a failed 2-point conversion. In the fourth quarter, the Panthers drove downfield 66 yards for the touchdown, which included a clutch 4th & 6. They again missed a 2-point conversion to put the game within 3 and keep the Gamblers up 17–12, which would be the final score.

==== Week 2: vs. Birmingham Stallions ====
Week 2: Birmingham Stallions at Houston Gamblers – Game summary

Quarter	1	2	3	4	Total
**Stallions**	10	3	13	7	**33**
Gamblers	9	9	3	7	**28**

at Protective Stadium, Birmingham, Alabama

- Date: April 23
- Game time: 7:00 p.m.
- Referee: Duane Heydt
- TV announcers (FS1): Kevin Kugler, Joel Klatt, Brock Huard

Game information

**First quarter**

- BIRM – Brian Allen interception return (Brandon Aubrey kick good), 14:13. Stallions 7–0.
- HOU – Nick Vogel 50-yard field goal, 11:46. Stallions 7–3 **Drive: 6 plays, 46 yards, 2:22.**
- HOU – William Likely interception return (Nick Vogel kick no good), 8:12. Gamblers 9–7.
- BIRM – Brandon Aubrey 31-yard field goal, 3:33. Stallions 10–9. **Drive: 9 plays, 47 yards, 4:29.**

**Second quarter**

- HOU – Isaiah Zuber 25 yard pass from Clayton Thorson (Clayton Thorson pass failed), 14:19. Gamblers 15–10. **Drive: 9 plays, 69 yards, 4:16.**
- BIRM – Brandon Aubrey 37-yard field goal, 6:07. Gamblers 15–13. **Drive: 7 plays, 17 yards, 4:01.**
- HOU – Nick Vogel 31-yard field goal, 3:03. Gamblers 18–13. **Drive: 9 plays, 69 yards, 4:16.**

**Third quarter**

- BHAM – Osirus Mitchell 34-yard pass from J'Mar Smith (Victor Bolden Jr. rush failed), 13:33. Stallions 19–18. **Drive: 4 plays, 64 yards, 1:34.**
- BHAM – C. J. Marable 3-yard rush (Brandon Aubrey kick good), 5:38. Stallions 26–18. **Drive: 11 plays, 78 yards, 6:48.**
- HOU – Nick Vogel 24-yard field goal, 1:11. Stallions 26–21. **Drive: 9 plays, 69 yards, 4:16.**

**Fourth quarter**

- BHAM – Marlon Williams 64-yard pass from J'Mar Smith (Brandon Aubrey kick good), 13:04. Stallions 33–21. **Drive: 5 plays, 74 yards, 3:14.**
- HOU – Tyler Simmons 44-yard pass from Clayton Thorson (Nick Vogel kick good), 12:24. Stallions 33–28. **Drive: 2 plays, 50 yards, 0:42.**

**Top passers**

- BIRM – J'Mar Smith – 20/30, 229 yards, 2 TD, INT
- HOU – Clayton Thorson – 12/27, 141 yards, 2 TD, 3 INT

**Top rushers**

- BIRM – C. J. Marable – 16 rushes, 76 yards, TD
- HOU – Mark Thompson – 16 rushes, 93 yards

**Top receivers**

- BIRM – Marlon Williams – 3 receptions, 88 yards, TD
- HOU – Tyler Simmons – 2 receptions, 53 yards, TD

For a second time in as many weeks, Stallions quarterback J'Mar Smith led Birmingham to three consecutive second half drives that ended with touchdowns. The reigning USFL Offensive Player of the Week, Smith went 19-of-29 for 214 yards on Saturday. His 34-yard, third quarter touchdown pass to Osirus Mitchell gave the Stallions a 19–18 lead. His 64-yard strike to Marlon Williams stretched Birmingham's lead to 33–21 with just over 13 minutes left.

Houston, who took an 18–13 halftime lead on the strength of Will Likely's 63-yard pick-six, made it a one-possession game when Clayton Thorson connected with Tyler Simmons for a 44-yard touchdown with 12:24 left. The Gamblers comeback bid came up short, however, when Lorenzo Burns recorded his second pick of Thorson with 1:13 left.

==== Week 3: vs. Tampa Bay Bandits ====
Week 3: Tampa Bay Bandits at Houston Gamblers – Game summary

Quarter	1	2	3	4	Total
**Bandits**	7	7	3	10	**27**
Gamblers	10	13	3	0	**26**

at Protective Stadium, Birmingham, Alabama

- Date: April 30
- Game time: 4:00 p.m. EST
- Referee: James Carter
- TV announcers (Fox): Kevin Kugler, Mark Sanchez, Brock Huard

The Gamblers will play against division rival Tampa Bay Bandits.

== Standings ==
South Division
#		W	L	PCT	GB	DIV	PF	PA	STK
1	(y) Birmingham Stallions	9	1	.900	–	5–1	234	169	W1
2	(x) New Orleans Breakers	6	4	.600	3	3–3	196	164	L1
3	(e) Tampa Bay Bandits	4	6	.400	5	2–4	162	195	L2
4	(e) Houston Gamblers	3	7	.300	6	2–4	196	208	W2
(x)–clinched playoff berth; (y)–clinched division; (e)–eliminated from playoff contention

=== Postseason ===
Gamblers did not make it to the playoffs after back to back losses.
