= 2022 New Jersey Generals season =

American professional football season

- General manager: Mike Riley
- Head coach: Mike Riley
- Home stadium: None

Results
- Record: 9–1
- League place: 1st in North Division
- Playoffs: Lost Division Finals (vs. Stars) 14–19

The 2022 New Jersey Generals season was the first season for the New Jersey Generals as a professional American football franchise. They played as charter members of the United States Football League, one of eight teams to compete in the league for the 2022 season. The Generals technically play as a traveling team (since the entirety of the regular season will be played at Protective Stadium and Legion Field in Birmingham, Alabama) and were led by head coach Mike Riley.

== Final roster ==
2022 New Jersey Generals roster
Quarterbacks (QB): 1 De'Andre Johnson; 2 Luis Perez; Running backs (RB): 27 Darius Victor; 3 Trey Williams; Wide receivers (WR): 18 Cameron Echols-Luper; 13 Alonzo Moore; 81 Randy Satterfield; 10 Darrius Shepherd; 5 KaVontae Turpin; Tight ends (TE): 80 Braedon Bowman; 88 Woody Brandom; 17 Wes Saxton	Offensive linemen (OL): 71 Calvin Ashley G/T; 76 Brandon Haskin T; 69 Evan Heim G; 68 Jake Lacina C; 51 Garrett McGhin T; 70 Robert Myers G; 72 Terry Poole T; Defensive linemen (DL): 90 Toby Johnson DT; 93 Hercules Mataʻafa DE; 99 Tyshun Render DE; 97 Destiny Vaeao DT; 98 Kalani Vakameilalo DT; 56 Bryson Young DE	Linebackers (LB): 50 Jalen Choice; 55 Kolin Hill; 4 D'Juan Hines; 45 Chris Orr; Defensive backs (DB): 7 Dravon Askew-Henry S; 41 De'Vante Bausby CB; 12 Mike Bell S; 20 D. J. Daniel CB; 21 Trae Elston CB; 24 Paris Ford S; 25 Shalom Luani S; 8 David Rivers CB; Special teams (ST): 89 Scott Flanick LS; 19 Brock Miller P; 14 Caden Novikoff K	Practice squad: 57 Mike Brown G; 60 Justin Calderon T; 29 Kingston Davis RB; 49 Angelo Garbutt LB; 11 Kyle Lauletta QB; 23 Landon Lenoir WR; 6 J'Mon Moore WR; 26 DeJuan Neal CB; 44 Mason Sikes TE; 95 Deyon Sizer DE; 22 Christian Tutt CB; Reserve: 11 Nick Rose K (DNR); Rookies in italics 40 active, 1 reserve, 11 practice squad

== Staff ==
2022 New Jersey Generals staff
Front office: General manager – Mike Riley; Head coaches: Head coach – Mike Riley; Offensive coaches: Offensive Coordinator/Offensive Line – Steven Smith; Quarterbacks – Zerick Rollins Jr.; Wide Receivers – James Rodgers; Running Backs/Tight Ends – Jay Locey	Defensive coaches: Defensive Coordinator – Cris Dishman; Defensive Line – Bob Diaco; Linebackers – Ken Watson; Defensive Backs – Dominique Franks

== Schedule ==
=== Regular season ===
The Generals' 2022 schedule was announced on March 7. They opened the season against the Birmingham Stallions Total: 9–1 Home: 5–0 Away: 4–1

Week	Date	Time (ET)	Opponent	Result	Record	TV	Recap
1	April 16	7:30 p.m.	Birmingham Stallions	**L** 24–28	0–1	NBC/Fox/Peacock	Recap
2	April 22	8:00 p.m.	**Michigan Panthers***	**W** 10–6	1–1	USA	Recap
3	May 1	8:00 p.m.	**Philadelphia Stars**	**W** 24–16	2–1	Peacock	Recap
4	May 7	2:30 p.m.	**Pittsburgh Maulers**	**W** 21–13	3–1	Peacock	Recap
5	May 14	3:00 p.m.	New Orleans Breakers*	**W** 27–17	4–1	Fox	Recap
6	May 22	4:00 p.m.	Houston Gamblers*	**W** 26–25	5–1	Fox	Recap
7	May 28	12:00 p.m.	Tampa Bay Bandits	**W** 20–13	6–1	USA	Recap
8	June 3	8:00 p.m.	**Pittsburgh Maulers***	**W** 29–18	7–1	USA	Recap
9	June 11	1:00 p.m.	**Michigan Panthers**	**W** 25–23	8–1	NBC/Peacock	Recap
10	June 18	12:00 p.m.	**Philadelphia Stars**	**W** 26–23	9–1	USA	Recap

Note: Intra-division opponents are in bold text. * mean that they host the game, since all eight teams play at the same stadium

=== Game summaries ===
==== Week 1: at Birmingham Stallions ====
Week 1: New Jersey Generals at Birmingham Stallions – Game summary

Quarter	1	2	3	4	Total
Generals	7	7	0	10	**24**
**Stallions**	7	0	7	14	**28**

at Protective Stadium, Birmingham, Alabama

- Date: April 16, 2022
- Game time: 7:30pm EST
- Referee: Larry Smith
- TV announcers (NBC/Fox/Peacock): Curt Menefee, Joel Klatt, Brock Huard
- Recap

Game information

**First quarter**

- NJ – Randy Satterfield 3-yard pass from Luis Perez (Nick Rose kick), 11:45. Generals 7–0. **Drive: 6 plays, 63 yards, 3:15.**
- BHAM – Osirus Mitchell 35-yard pass from Alex McGough (Brandon Aubrey kick), 11:09. Tied 7–7. **Drive: 2 plays, 57 yards, 0:36.**

**Second quarter**

- NJ – Braedon Bowman 13-yard pass from Luis Perez (Nick Rose kick), 9:08. Generals 14–7. **Drive: 7 plays, 51 yards, 4:00.**

**Third quarter**

- BHAM – C. J. Marable 3-yard run (Brandon Aubrey kick), 0:37. Tied 14–14. **Drive: 9 plays, 80 yards, 4:13.**

**Fourth quarter**

- NJ – De'Andre Johnson 4-yard run (Nick Rose kick), 9:14. Generals 21–14. **Drive: 11 plays, 65 yards, 6:23.**
- BHAM – Cary Angeline 28-yard pass from J'Mar Smith (Brandon Aubrey kick), 5:51. Tied 21–21. **Drive: 6 plays, 67 yards, 3:23.**
- NJ – Nick Rose 47-yard field goal, 1:54. Generals 24–21. **Drive: 8 plays, 38 yards, 4:02.**
- BHAM – J'Mar Smith 2-yard run (Brandon Aubrey kick), 0:23. **Drive: 10 plays, 59 yards, 1:26.**

**Top passers**

- NJ – Luis Perez – 13/18, 143 yards, 2 TD
- BHAM – J'Mar Smith – 11/21, 156 yards, TD

**Top rushers**

- NJ – De'Andre Johnson – 12 rushes, 98 yards, TD
- BHAM – Tony Brooks-James – 8 rushes, 27 yards

**Top receivers**

- NJ – Randy Satterfield – 5 receptions, 100 yards, TD
- BHAM – Osirus Mitchell – 5 receptions, 96 yards, TD

The Generals started their first season in the inaugural opener for the USFL against the Stallions. The first pass went for 49 yards to Randy Satterfield. The first score came on a Satterfield reception from Luis Perez, putting the Generals up 7–0. The Stallions answered with a 35-yard touchdown pass to Osirus Mitchell to tie the game 7–7. The rest of the quarter saw the teams trade punts. The Generals scored the only points of the 2nd quarter with a touchdown after an Alex McGough interception, putting the Generals up 14–7. Kicker Nick Rose also missed a 47-yard field goal that would've put the Generals up 17–7. On their first drive of the second half, the Generals drove 75 yards down field and set up a 22-yard field goal for Rose which he missed. The Stallions then scored with a C. J. Marable 3-yard rush, tying the game 14–14. In the fourth quarter, the Generals drove 65 yards for a touchdown putting them up 21–14. The Stallions would respond with a 6 play 67-yard touchdown, tying it up again at 21–21. The Generals responded with a 38-yard field goal drive, ending in a 47-yard field goal, putting the Generals at 24–21 with 1:54 remaining. However, the Stallions would respond by driving 59 yards downfield for a touchdown that would give them their first lead at 28–24, which would be the final score.

==== Week 2: vs. Michigan Panthers ====
Week 2: Michigan Panthers at New Jersey Generals – Game summary

Quarter	1	2	3	4	Total
Panthers	0	6	0	0	**6**
Generals	3	7	0	0	**10**

at Protective Stadium, Birmingham, Alabama

- Date: April 22
- Game time: 8:00 p.m. EST
- Referee: Duane Heydt
- TV announcers (USA): Paul Burmeister, Michael Robinson, Lewis Johnson

Game information

**First quarter**

- NJ – Nick Rose 21-yard field goal, 5:25. Generals 3–0. **Drive: 11 plays, 59 yards, 6:11.**

**Second quarter**

- MICH – Cameron Scarlett 4-yard rush (Michael Carrizosa kick failed), 13:39. Panthers 6–3. **Drive: 3 plays, 20 yards, 1:07.**
- NJ – Darius Victor 1-yard rush (Nick Rose kick good), 1:57. Generals 10–6. **Drive: 11 plays, 67 yards, 6:27.**

**Top passers**

- NJ – Luis Perez – 13/19, 97 yards, INT
- MICH – Shea Patterson – 14/29, 124 yards

**Top rushers**

- NJ – Darius Victor – 11 rushes, 40 yards, TD
- MICH – Stevie Scott III – 7 rushes, 25 yards

**Top receivers**

- NJ – Darrius Shepherd – 5 receptions, 58 yards
- MICH – Marcus Baugh – 3 receptions, 38 yards

The Generals played against their division rival Michigan Panthers to open Week 2. The Generals struck first on a 21-yard field goal to put the Generals up 3–0 to score the only points of the first. In the second quarter, Panthers safety Orion Stewart intercepted Luis Perez and brought it back to the Generals 20 yard line. The Panthers capitalized, scoring a touchdown three plays later, putting the Generals down 3–6. After trading punts, the Generals drove downfield that was capped off by a Darius Victor 1 yard rush, putting the Generals up 10–6.

We’ve got to settle down at the quarterback spot. Offensively, we have an extra day this week, and we need it. We have got to figure out who we are and what we can do best, and focus in on those type of things.

— Panthers head coach, Jeff Fisher, April 22, 2022, Fox Sports

The Panthers received the ball to start the second half. They drove downfield on a 15 play, 53 yard drive that ate up more than half the third quarter. On the Generals 21 yard line, the Panthers attempted a 39-yard field goal, but it was missed. In the fourth quarter, the Generals had a chance to go up 13–6, but they also missed a 34-yard field goal. Both teams failed to score in the fourth quarter, ending up in a 10–6 Generals win, rising to 1–1.

==== Week 3: at Philadelphia Stars ====
Week 3: New Jersey Generals at Philadelphia Stars – Game summary

Quarter	1	2	3	4	Total
Generals	0	3	7	14	**24**
Stars	7	3	6	0	**16**

at Protective Stadium, Birmingham, Alabama

- Date: May 1
- Game time: 8:00 p.m. EST
- Referee: James Carter
- TV announcers (Peacock): Paul Burmeister, Michael Robinson, Corey Robinson

The Generals took on division rival Philadelphia Stars in a game in which the winner would gain 1st in the North Division. With 11:23 left in the 1st quarter, Stars quarterback Bryan Scott completed a 41-yard touchdown pass to tight end Bug Howard. On the final drive of the first quarter. In the 2nd quarter, the Stars drove into the red zone, but only came away with 3 points on a Matt Mengel 22-yard field goal, extending their lead to 10–0. The Generals would drive the game to a 1 possession game before half, connecting on a 54-yard field goal by kicker Nick Rose. The Stars would lead 10–3 at halftime.

On the first drive of the second half, the Generals would tie the game at 10 on a 4-yard Darius Victor rushing touchdown. But on the next drive, the Stars would take the lead on a 6-yard pass from quarterback Case Cookus to wide receiver Diondre Overton. The 4th quarter would be all New Jersey, as they would get 14 unanswered points. A 1-yard Darius Victor run, and a 4-yard De'Andre Johnson run. The win put the Generals in sole possession of first place in the North Division.

== Standings ==
North Division
#		W	L	PCT	GB	DIV	PF	PA	STK
1	(y) New Jersey Generals	9	1	.900	–	6–0	232	182	W9
2	(x) Philadelphia Stars	6	4	.600	3	4–2	262	243	L1
3	(e) Michigan Panthers	2	8	.200	7	2–4	211	236	W1
4	(e) Pittsburgh Maulers	1	9	.100	8	0–6	147	243	L5
(x)–clinched playoff berth; (y)–clinched division; (e)–eliminated from playoff contention

=== Postseason ===
Round	Date	Time (ET)	Opponent	Result	Record	TV	Recap
Division Finals	June 25	3:00 p.m.	vs. Philadelphia Stars	L 14–19	0–1	Fox	Recap
