= 2022 Birmingham Stallions season =

American professional football season

- General manager: Skip Holtz
- Head coach: Skip Holtz
- Home stadium: Protective Stadium; Legion Field

Results
- Record: 9–1
- League place: 1st in South Division
- Playoffs: Won Division Finals (vs. Breakers) 31–17; Won USFL Championship (at Stars) 33–30

The 2022 Birmingham Stallions season was the first season for the Birmingham Stallions as a professional American football franchise. They play as charter members of the United States Football League, one of eight teams to compete in the league for the 2022 season. The Stallions play their home games at Protective Stadium and Legion Field and are led by head coach Skip Holtz.

In week 8, the Stallions clinched the South division.

== Background and history ==
As is the case with all eight teams competing in the league, the Birmingham Stallions take their name and color scheme from a franchise of the same name that competed in the original USFL. The original Birmingham Stallions, who competed in the USFL from 1983 to 1985, finished at or above .500 in each of their three seasons and were led by head coach Rollie Dotsch for the duration of their existence.

The identical team names were the subject of a lawsuit brought to Fox by the owners of the original USFL, who claimed trademark infringement and false advertising on the part of the new league.

== Final roster ==
2022 Birmingham Stallions roster
Quarterbacks (QB): 2 Alex McGough; 6 J'Mar Smith; Running backs (RB): 20 Tony Brooks-James; 44 Bobby Holly; 11 C. J. Marable; 25 Bo Scarbrough; Wide receivers (WR): 7 Victor Bolden Jr.; 8 Michael Dereus; 16 Adrian Hardy; 4 Osirus Mitchell; 17 Marlon Williams; Tight ends (TE): 14 Sage Surratt	Offensive linemen (OL): 74 O'Shea Dugas G; 73 Darius Harper T; 78 Cameron Hunt G; 51 Jordan McCray C; 77 Ryan Pope T; 65 Tyree St. Louis T; 76 Marquez Tucker G; Defensive linemen (DL): 90 Doug Costin DT; 91 Chauncy Haney DE; 96 Willie Henry DT; 55 Jonathan Newsome DE; 95 Seth Thomas DT/DE; 99 Dondrea Tillman DE; 97 Willie Yarbary DT	Linebackers (LB): 40 Brody Buck; 47 DeMarquis Gates; 57 Terrill Hanks; 59 Quentin Poling; 33 Scooby Wright; Defensive backs (DB): 29 Brian Allen CB; 22 Lorenzo Burns CB; 3 Tae Hayes CB; 5 Christian McFarland S; 9 Tyree Robinson S; 26 Josh Shaw CB; 27 JoJo Tillery S; Special teams (ST): 10 Brandon Aubrey K; 41 Ryan Langan LS; 15 Colby Wadman P	Practice squad: 86 Cary Angeline TE; 38 Trey Baldwin LB; 50 Keyshon Camp DT; 12 Montell Cozart QB; 19 Malik Gant S; 21 Bryan Mills CB; 30 Josh Nurse CB; 1 Peyton Ramzy WR; 67 Michael Rodriguez T; 13 Jeff Thomas WR; Reserve: 90 Aaron Adeoye DE (IR); 36 Nate Holley S (IR); Rookies in italics 41 active, 2 reserve, 10 practice squad

The Stallions, like all other teams, have a 38-man active roster with a 7-man practice squad. Their first picks in the 2022 USFL draft included quarterback Alex McGough (round 1, pick 6), defensive end Aaron Adeoye (round 2, pick 11), and offensive tackle Chauncy Haney (round 3, pick 22).

== Staff ==
The Stallions' first head coach and general manager is Skip Holtz, who will also lead Birmingham's offense. Holtz, who served in various positions on college coaching staffs from 1987 to 2021, served most recently in head coaching positions at East Carolina, South Florida, and Louisiana Tech. After finishing the 2021 season at Louisiana Tech with a record of 3–9, he was fired. The Stallions' defense will be led by John Chavis, whose most recent coaching positions include defensive coordinator spots at Tennessee, LSU, Texas A&M, and Arkansas.

2022 Birmingham Stallions staff
Front office: General manager – Skip Holtz; Head coaches: Head coach – Skip Holtz; Offensive coaches: Offensive coordinator/Quarterbacks – Skip Holtz; Running backs – Larry Kirksey; Wide receivers – Mike Jones; Offensive line – Jonathan Himebauch	Defensive coaches: Defensive coordinator/Linebackers – John Chavis; Defensive line – Bill Johnson; Defensive backs – Corey Chamblin

== Schedule ==
=== Regular season ===
The Stallions' 2022 schedule was announced on March 7. They opened the season against the New Jersey Generals in the league's inaugural game, which did simulcast by both NBC and Fox, with an additional broadcast on NBC's Peacock streaming service. This was the first simulcast of a live sporting event by rival television networks since 1967. Because the regular season is being held in its entirety at Protective Stadium and Legion Field in Birmingham, Alabama, the Stallions will play all of their games at their home stadium. The schedule format has each team playing a ten-game regular season, consisting of two games against each division opponent and one game against each team in the opposite division.

Week	Date	Time (ET)	Opponent	Result	Record	TV	Recap
1	April 16	7:30 p.m.	New Jersey Generals*	**W** 28–24	1–0	NBC/Fox/Peacock	Recap
2	April 23	7:00 p.m.	**Houston Gamblers**	**W** 33–28	2–0	FS1	Recap
3	April 30	8:00 p.m.	**New Orleans Breakers**	**W** 22–13	3–0	Fox	Recap
4	May 7	7:00 p.m.	**Tampa Bay Bandits***	**W** 16–10	4–0	Fox	Recap
5	May 15	12:00 p.m.	Philadelphia Stars	**W** 30–17	5–0	NBC/Peacock	Recap
6	May 21	7:30 p.m.	Michigan Panthers*	**W** 33–17	6–0	NBC/Peacock	Recap
7	May 29	2:00 p.m.	Pittsburgh Maulers	**W** 26–16	7–0	Fox	Recap
8	June 4	3:00 p.m.	**New Orleans Breakers***	**W** 10–9	8–0	Fox	Recap
9	June 11	6:00 p.m.	**Houston Gamblers***	**L** 15–17	8–1	USA	Recap
10	June 18	4:00 p.m.	**Tampa Bay Bandits**	**W** 21–18	9–1	Fox	Recap

Note: Intra-division opponents are in bold text. * mean that they host the game, since all eight teams play at the same stadium

=== Game summaries ===
==== Week 1: vs. New Jersey Generals ====
Week 1: New Jersey Generals at Birmingham Stallions – Game summary

Quarter	1	2	3	4	Total
Generals	7	7	0	10	**24**
**Stallions**	7	0	7	14	**28**

at Protective Stadium, Birmingham, Alabama

- Date: April 16, 2022
- Game time: 7:30pm EST
- Referee: Larry Smith
- TV announcers (NBC/Fox/Peacock): Curt Menefee, Joel Klatt, Brock Huard
- Recap

Game information

**First quarter**

- NJ – Randy Satterfield 3-yard pass from Luis Perez (Nick Rose kick), 11:45. Generals 7–0. **Drive: 6 plays, 63 yards, 3:15.**
- BHAM – Osirus Mitchell 35-yard pass from Alex McGough (Brandon Aubrey kick), 11:09. Tied 7–7. **Drive: 2 plays, 57 yards, 0:36.**

**Second quarter**

- NJ – Braedon Bowman 13-yard pass from Luis Perez (Nick Rose kick), 9:08. Generals 14–7. **Drive: 7 plays, 51 yards, 4:00.**

**Third quarter**

- BHAM – C. J. Marable 3-yard run (Brandon Aubrey kick), 0:37. Tied 14–14. **Drive: 9 plays, 80 yards, 4:13.**

**Fourth quarter**

- NJ – De'Andre Johnson 4-yard run (Nick Rose kick), 9:14. Generals 21–14. **Drive: 11 plays, 65 yards, 6:23.**
- BHAM – Cary Angeline 28-yard pass from J'Mar Smith (Brandon Aubrey kick), 5:51. Tied 21–21. **Drive: 6 plays, 67 yards, 3:23.**
- NJ – Nick Rose 47-yard field goal, 1:54. Generals 24–21. **Drive: 8 plays, 38 yards, 4:02.**
- BHAM – J'Mar Smith 2-yard run (Brandon Aubrey kick), 0:23. Stallions 28–24. **Drive: 10 plays, 59 yards, 1:26.**

**Top passers**

- NJ – Luis Perez – 13/18, 143 yards, 2 TD
- BHAM – J'Mar Smith – 11/21, 156 yards, TD

**Top rushers**

- NJ – De'Andre Johnson – 12 rushes, 98 yards, TD
- BHAM – Tony Brooks-James – 8 rushes, 27 yards

**Top receivers**

- NJ – Randy Satterfield – 5 receptions, 100 yards, TD
- BHAM – Osirus Mitchell – 5 receptions, 96 yards, TD

The Stallions started their first season in the inaugural opener for the USFL against the New Jersey Generals. The Stallions won the coin toss and elected to defer. The Generals scored on their first drive to put the Stallions down 0–7. The Stallions answered with a 35-yard touchdown pass to Osirus Mitchell to tie the game 7–7. The rest of the quarter saw the teams trade punts. The Generals scored the only points of the second quarter with a touchdown after an Alex McGough interception, putting the Stallions behind 7–14. The Stallions then scored the only points of the third quarter with a C. J. Marable 3-yard rush, tying the game 14–14. In the fourth quarter the Generals scored first, putting the Stallions down 14–21. The Stallions would respond with a 6 play 67-yard touchdown, tying it up again at 21–21. The Generals responded with a 38-yard field goal drive, ending in a 47-yard field goal, putting the Stallions at 21–24 with 1:54 remaining. The Stallions responded by driving 59 yards downfield for a touchdown that would give them their first lead at 28–24, which would be the final score.

==== Week 2: at Houston Gamblers ====
Week 2: Birmingham Stallions at Houston Gamblers – Game summary

Quarter	1	2	3	4	Total
**Stallions**	10	3	13	7	**33**
Gamblers	9	9	3	7	**28**

at Protective Stadium, Birmingham, Alabama

- Date: April 23
- Game time: 7:00 p.m.
- Referee: Duane Heydt
- TV announcers (FS1): Kevin Kugler, Joel Klatt, Brock Huard

Game information

**First quarter**

- BHAM – Brian Allen interception return (Brandon Aubrey kick good), 14:13. Stallions 7–0.
- HOU – Nick Vogel 50-yard field goal, 11:46. Stallions 7–3 **Drive: 6 plays, 46 yards, 2:22.**
- HOU – William Likely interception return (Nick Vogel kick no good), 8:12. Gamblers 9–7.
- BHAM – Brandon Aubrey 31-yard field goal, 3:33. Stallions 10–9. **Drive: 9 plays, 47 yards, 4:29.**

**Second quarter**

- HOU – Isaiah Zuber 25 yard pass from Clayton Thorson (Clayton Thorson pass failed), 14:19. Gamblers 15–10. **Drive: 9 plays, 69 yards, 4:16.**
- BHAM – Brandon Aubrey 37-yard field goal, 6:07. Gamblers 15–13. **Drive: 7 plays, 17 yards, 4:01.**
- HOU – Nick Vogel 31-yard field goal, 3:03. Gamblers 18–13. **Drive: 9 plays, 69 yards, 4:16.**

**Third quarter**

- BHAM – Osirus Mitchell 34-yard pass from J'Mar Smith (Victor Bolden Jr. rush failed), 13:33. Stallions 19–18. **Drive: 4 plays, 64 yards, 1:34.**
- BHAM – C. J. Marable 3-yard rush (Brandon Aubrey kick good), 5:38. Stallions 26–18. **Drive: 11 plays, 78 yards, 6:48.**
- HOU – Nick Vogel 24-yard field goal, 1:11. Stallions 26–21. **Drive: 9 plays, 69 yards, 4:16.**

**Fourth quarter**

- BHAM – Marlon Williams 64-yard pass from J'Mar Smith (Brandon Aubrey kick good), 13:04. Stallions 33–21. **Drive: 5 plays, 74 yards, 3:14.**
- HOU – Tyler Simmons 44-yard pass from Clayton Thorson (Nick Vogel kick good), 12:24. Stallions 33–28. **Drive: 2 plays, 50 yards, 0:42.**

**Top passers**

- BHAM – J'Mar Smith – 20/30, 229 yards, 2 TD, INT
- HOU – Clayton Thorson – 12/27, 141 yards, 2 TD, 3 INT

**Top rushers**

- BHAM – C. J. Marable – 16 rushes, 76 yards, TD
- HOU – Mark Thompson – 16 rushes, 93 yards

**Top receivers**

- BHAM – Marlon Williams – 3 receptions, 88 yards, TD
- HOU – Tyler Simmons – 2 receptions, 53 yards, TD

For a second time in as many weeks, Stallions quarterback J'Mar Smith led Birmingham to three consecutive second half drives that ended with touchdowns. The reigning USFL Offensive Player of the Week, Smith went 19-of-29 for 214 yards on Saturday. His 34-yard, third quarter touchdown pass to Osirus Mitchell gave the Stallions a 19–18 lead. His 64-yard strike to Marlon Williams stretched Birmingham's lead to 33–21 with just over 13 minutes left.

Houston, who took an 18–13 halftime lead on the strength of Will Likely's 63-yard pick-six, made it a one-possession game when Clayton Thorson connected with Tyler Simmons for a 44-yard touchdown with 12:24 left. The Gamblers comeback bid came up short, however, when Lorenzo Burns recorded his second pick of Thorson with 1:13 left.

==== Week 3: at New Orleans Breakers ====
Week 3: Birmingham Stallions at New Orleans Breakers – Game summary

Quarter	1	2	3	4	Total
Stallions	0	10	0	12	**22**
Breakers	0	6	7	0	**13**

at Protective Stadium, Birmingham, Alabama

- Date: April 30
- Game time: 8:00 p.m. EST
- Referee: Larry Smith
- TV announcers (Fox): Curt Menefee, Joel Klatt, Brock Huard

Game information

**Second quarter**

- BHAM – Marlon Williams 47-yard catch from J'Mar Smith (Brandon Aubrey kick good), 8:23. Stallions 7–0. **Drive: 7 plays, 78 yards, 3:16.**
- NO – Johnnie Dixon 2-yard catch from Kyle Sloter (Austin MacGinnis kick no good), 1:12. Stallions 7–6. **Drive: 13 plays, 85 yards, 5:07.**
- BHAM – Brandon Aubrey 33-yard field goal, 0:07. Stallions 10–7. **Drive: 11 plays, 57 yards, 1:09.**

**Third quarter**

- NO – Johnnie Dixon 11-yard catch from Kyle Sloter (Austin MacGinnis kick good), 6:10. Stallions 10–6. **Drive: 17 plays, 77 yards, 8:50.**

**Fourth quarter**

- BHAM – Victor Bolden Jr. 19-yard catch from J'Mar Smith (Brandon Aubrey kick good), 7:56. Stallions 17–13. **Drive: 8 plays, 68 yards, 3:06.**
- BHAM – Kyle Sloter sacked in endzone, 7:43. Stallions 19–13.
- BHAM – Brandon Aubrey 32-yard field goal, 1:19. Stallions 22–13. **Drive: 4 plays, 0 yards, 1:23.**

**Top passers**

- BHAM – J'Mar Smith – 15/38, 197 yards, 2 TD, INT
- NO – Kyle Sloter – 26/47, 240 yards, 2 TD, INT

**Top rushers**

- BHAM – J'Mar Smith – 8 rushes, 59 yards
- NO – Jordan Ellis – 25 rushes, 90 yards

**Top receivers**

- BHAM – Victor Bolden Jr. – 6 receptions, 70 yards, TD
- NO – Johnnie Dixon – 2 receptions, 53 yards, TD

The 2–0 Stallions played against division rival, the 2–0 New Orleans Breakers. In what started off as a slow offensive performance for both sides, the Stallions got a 7–0 lead on a J'Mar Smith screen pass to Marlon Williams. Later into the 2nd quarter, the Breakers scored on a 10-yard pass from Kyle Sloter to Johnnie Dixon which made the Stallions lead trim down to 7–6. With 7 seconds left in the half, Brandon Aubrey made a 33-yard field goal to give Birmingham a 10–6 lead at the half.

Coming out of the half, the Breakers conducted an 8:50 17 play drive to regain the lead at 13–10 on an 11-yard pass from Sloter to Dixon. This would be the last time the Breakers would score all game. Birmingham would score 12 points in the final quarter of play. A touchdown from Smith to Victor Bolden Jr, a safety forced by Dondrea Tillman, and a Brandon Aubrey field goal. Birmingham would end up winning 22–13, which put them in sole possession of first place in the South Division with a 3–0 record.

== Standings ==
South Division
#		W	L	PCT	GB	DIV	PF	PA	STK
1	(y) Birmingham Stallions	9	1	.900	–	5–1	234	169	W1
2	(x) New Orleans Breakers	6	4	.600	3	3–3	196	164	L1
3	(e) Tampa Bay Bandits	4	6	.400	5	2–4	162	195	L2
4	(e) Houston Gamblers	3	7	.300	6	2–4	196	208	W2
(x)–clinched playoff berth; (y)–clinched division; (e)–eliminated from playoff contention

=== Postseason ===
Round	Date	Time (ET)	Opponent	Result	Record	TV	Recap
Division Finals	June 25	8:00 p.m.	vs. New Orleans Breakers	W 31–17	1–0	NBC/Peacock	Recap
USFL Championship	July 3	7:30 p.m.	at Philadelphia Stars	W 33–30	2–0	Fox	Recap
