= 2023 Birmingham Stallions season =

American football season

- Owner: National Spring Football League Enterprises Co, LLC, (Fox Sports)
- General manager: Zach Potter
- Head coach: Skip Holtz
- Home stadium: Protective Stadium

Results
- Record: 8–2
- Division place: 1st in South Division
- Playoffs: Won Division Finals (vs. Breakers) 47–22; Won USFL Championship (vs. Maulers) 28–12

The 2023 season was the Birmingham Stallions second season in the United States Football League and their second under head coach, Skip Holtz and first under general manager Zach Potter. The Stallions successfully defended their championship title this season after winning the 2023 USFL Championship Game.

== Draft ==
2023 Birmingham Stallions draft
Round	Selection	Player	Position	College	Notes
1	7	Kadeem Telfort	Offensive tackle	UAB	
2	14	Quinton Barrow	Offensive tackle	Grand Valley State	
3	22	Malik Cunningham	Quarterback	Louisville	
4	30	Derius Davis	Wide receiver	TCU	
5	38	Zeke Vandenburgh	Defensive end	Illinois State	
6	47	Colby Sorsdal	Offensive tackle	William & Mary	
7	55	Grant DuBose	Wide receiver	Charlotte	
8	63	Mark Evans II	Offensive guard	Arkansas Pine-Bluff	
9	71	B. J. Thompson	Defensive end	Stephen F. Austin	
10	79	Starling Thomas	Defensive back	UAB	

== Roster ==
2023 Birmingham Stallions final roster
Quarterbacks: 2 Alex McGough; 18 Jalen Morton; 3 Kyle Sloter; Running backs: 11 C. J. Marable; 23 Ricky Person Jr.; 4 ZaQuandre White; Wide receivers: 85 Deon Cain; 13 Davion Davis; 8 Michael Dereus; 16 Adrian Hardy; 1 Josh Johnson; 19 Peyton Ramzy; 14 Austin Watkins; Tight ends: 86 Thaddeus Moss; 80 La'Michael Pettway; 12 Jace Sternberger	Offensive linemen: 69 Cohl Cabral C; 74 O'Shea Dugas G; 77 Derwin Gray G; 76 Darius Harper T; 63 Matt Kaskey T; 77 Ryan Pope T; 65 Cole Schneider G; 79 Tre'Vour Wallace-Simms G; Defensive linemen: 50 Keyshon Camp DE; 94 Darrion Daniels DT; 95 Khalil Davis DT; 96 Willie Henry DT; 78 Jordan Thompson DE/DT; 99 Dondrea Tillman DE; 97 Willie Yarbary DT	Linebackers: 40 Brody Buck; 51 Damon Lloyd; 47 Joe Ozougwu; 35 Rashad Smith; 57 Elijah Sullivan; 33 Scooby Wright; Defensive backs: 29 Brian Allen CB; 26 Nate Brooks CB; 22 Lorenzo Burns CB; 7 T. J. Carter S; 31 Matt Hankins CB; 36 Nate Holley S; 5 Christian McFarland S; 21 Bryan Mills CB; 9 Tyree Robinson S; 27 JoJo Tillery S; Special teams: 10 Brandon Aubrey K; 41 Ryan Langan LS; 15 Colby Wadman P	Reserve lists: -- Mark Fields CB (DNR); 44 Bobby Holly FB (IR); 90 Joe Jackson DE (Susp.); 67 Jahmir Johnson T (IR); 81 Myron Mitchell WR (IR); 55 Jonathan Newsome DE (IR); 59 Quentin Poling LB (Susp.); 25 Bo Scarbrough RB (IR); 6 J'Mar Smith QB (IR); -- Tyree St. Louis T Retired; -- Marquez Tucker G Retired; 17 Marlon Williams WR (IR); 50 active, 12 inactive

== Staff ==
2023 Birmingham Stallions staff
Front office: General manager – Zach Potter; Head coaches: Head coach/Offensive coordinator/Quarterbacks – Skip Holtz; Offensive coaches: Running backs – Larry Kirksey; Wide receivers – Mike Jones; Offensive line – Neil Callaway	Defensive coaches: Defensive coordinator/Linebackers – John Chavis; Defensive line – Marty Long; Defensive backs – Bob Shoop; Assistant defensive backs - Daric Riley

== Schedule ==
=== Regular season ===
Week	Date	Time (ET)	Opponent	Result	Record	TV	Venue	Recap
1	April 15	7:30 p.m.	vs. New Jersey Generals	**W** 27–10	1–0	Fox	Protective Stadium	Recap
2	April 22	7:00 p.m.	vs. **Memphis Showboats**	**W** 42–2	2–0	Fox	Protective Stadium	Recap
3	April 29	12:30 p.m.	vs. **New Orleans Breakers**	**L** 31–45	2–1	USA	Protective Stadium	Recap
4	May 7	6:30 p.m.	at Pittsburgh Maulers	**W** 24–20	3–1	FS1	Tom Benson Hall of Fame Stadium	Recap
5	May 13	4:00 p.m.	vs. **Houston Gamblers**	**L** 20–27	3–2	Fox	Protective Stadium	Recap
6	May 20	4:00 p.m.	at Michigan Panthers	**W** 27–13	4–2	Fox	Ford Field	Recap
7	May 27	4:00 p.m.	at **New Orleans Breakers**	**W** 24–20	5–2	Fox	Protective Stadium	Recap
8	June 3	3:00 p.m.	vs. Philadelphia Stars	**W** 27–24	6–2	NBC	Protective Stadium	Recap
9	June 11	1:00 p.m.	at **Houston Gamblers**	**W** 38–15	7–2	NBC, Peacock (Note: Game coverage started on Peacock and NBC joined the game in progress.)	Simmons Bank Liberty Stadium	Recap
10	June 18	4:00 p.m.	at **Memphis Showboats**	**W** 27–20	8–2	Fox	Simmons Bank Liberty Stadium	Recap

Bold indicates divisional opponent.

=== Week 1: vs. New Jersey Generals ===
Week 1: Birmingham Stallions vs New Jersey Generals – Game summary

Quarter	1	2	3	4	Total
Generals	0	10	0	0	**10**
**Stallions**	7	10	7	3	**27**

at Protective Stadium

- Date: April 15
- Game time: 7:30 p.m. EST
- Referee: Adam Savoie
- TV announcers (Fox): Curt Menefee, Joel Klatt and Brock Huard

Game information

**First quarter** **Second quarter** **Third quarter** **Fourth quarter**

**Top passers** **Top rushers** **Top receivers**

== Standings ==
South Division
#		W	L	PCT	GB	DIV	PF	PA	STK
1	(y) Birmingham Stallions	8	2	.800	–	4–2	287	196	W5
2	(x) New Orleans Breakers	7	3	.700	1	4–2	237	184	W3
3	(e) Houston Gamblers	5	5	.500	3	2–4	223	236	L2
4	(e) Memphis Showboats	5	5	.500	3	2–4	190	213	L2
(x)–clinched playoff berth; (y)–clinched division; (e)–eliminated from playoff contention

=== Postseason ===
Round	Date	Time (ET)	Opponent	Result	Record	TV	Recap
South Division Semifinal	June 25	7:00 p.m.	vs. New Orleans Breakers	W 47–22	1–0	Fox	Recap
USFL Championship	July 1	8:00 p.m.	vs. Pittsburgh Maulers	W 28–12	2–0	NBC	Recap
