= 2022 Michigan Panthers season =

American professional football season

- General manager: Jeff Fisher
- Head coach: Jeff Fisher
- Home stadium: None (Note: The Panthers technically play as a traveling team, since the entirety of the regular season has been played at Protective Stadium and Legion Field in Birmingham, Alabama.)

Results
- Record: 2–8
- League place: 3rd in North Division
- Playoffs: Did not qualify

The 2022 season was the Michigan Panthers' first season as a professional American football franchise. They played as charter members of the United States Football League, one of eight teams to compete in the league for the 2022 season. The Panthers technically played as a traveling team due to them playing at Protective Stadium and Legion Field. The Panthers were led by head coach Jeff Fisher, who also operated as the de facto general manager.

== Offseason ==
=== Draft ===
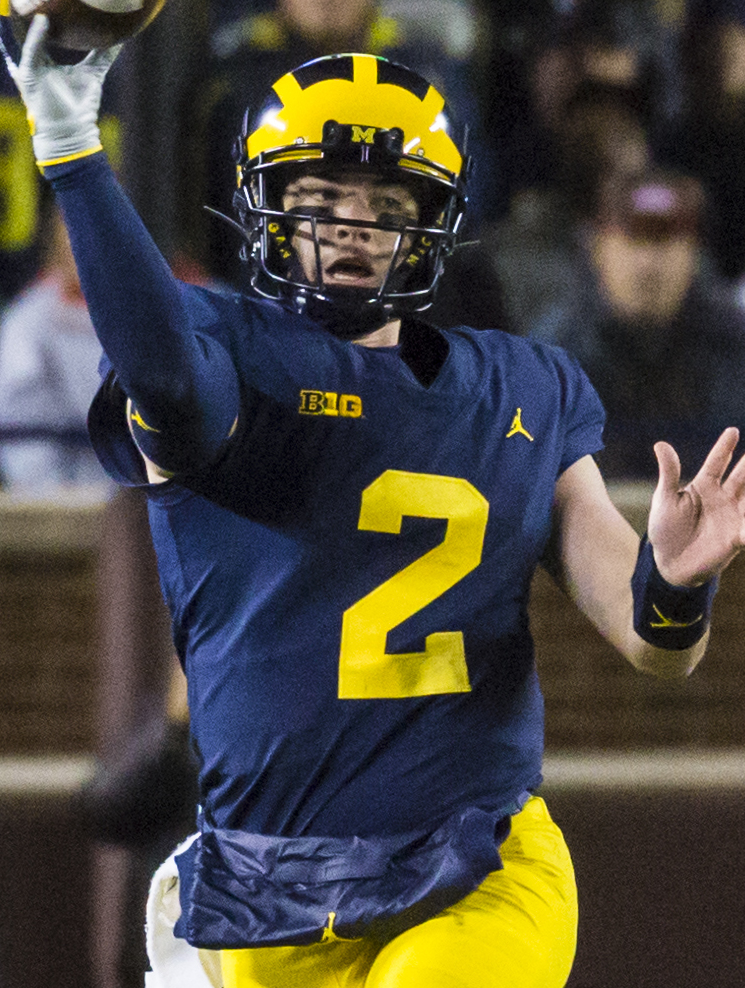
Shea Patterson was selected first overall by the Panthers.

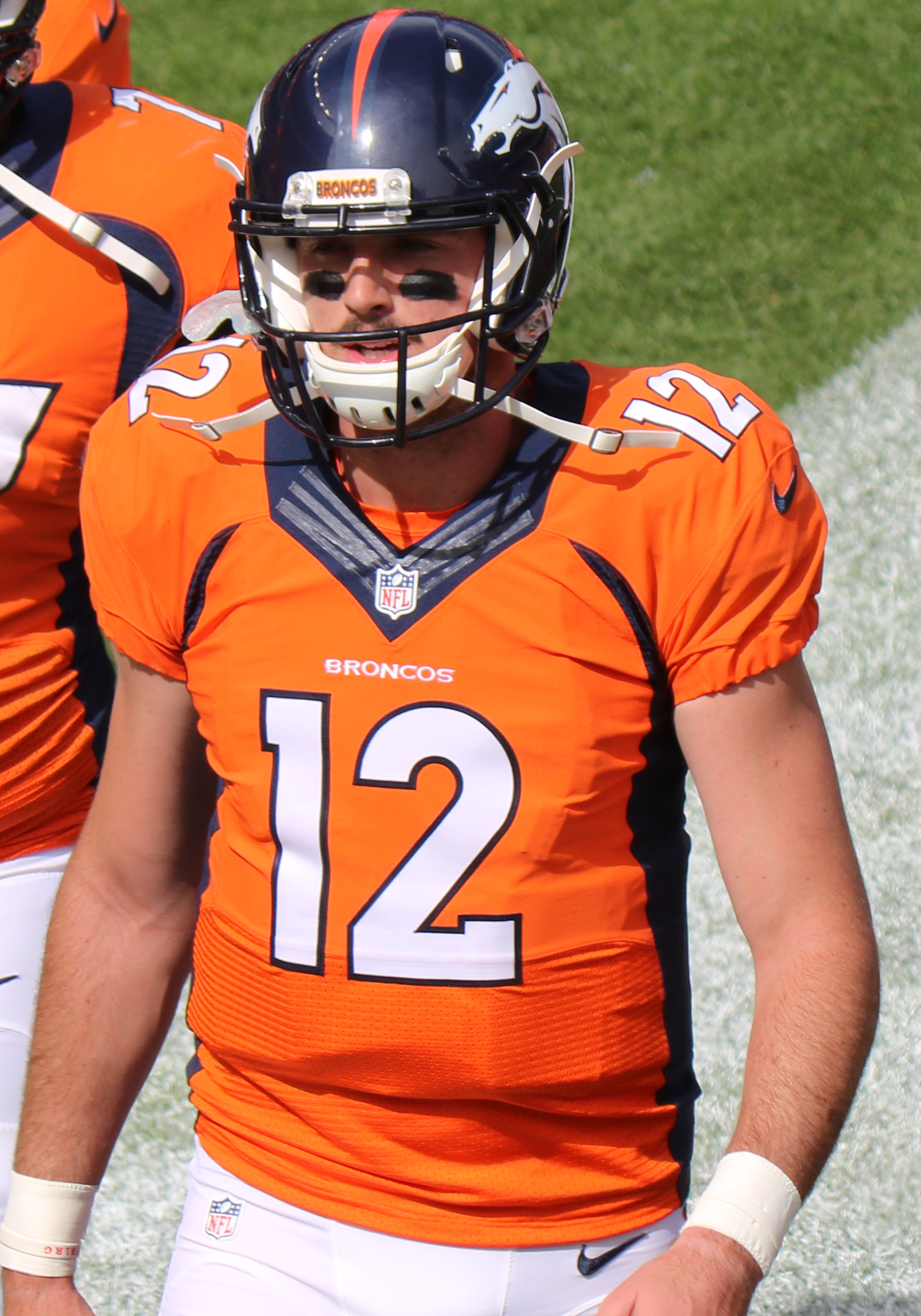
Paxton Lynch was selected in the twelfth round by the Panthers.

The 2022 USFL draft was conducted entirely on social media. Draft selections by the Michigan Panthers were announced on their social media. The Panthers selected former Michigan quarterback Shea Patterson first overall. The Panthers also selected former Broncos quarterback Paxton Lynch, a first round draft pick in the NFL, in the twelfth round. Another notable player selected was wide receiver Jeff Badet, who played alongside Oklahoma and future Browns quarterback Baker Mayfield in his Heisman Trophy season.

2022 Michigan Panthers Draft
Round	Selection	Player	Position	College	Notes
1	1	Shea Patterson	QB	Michigan	
2	8	Adewale Adeoye	DE	Utah	
3	1	Cavon Walker	DE	Maryland	
4	8	Chase DeMoor	DE	Central Washington	
5	5	Keith Williams	OT	Colorado State	
6	4	Teton Saltes	OT	New Mexico	
7	5	Joshua Dunlop	OT	UTSA	
7	10	Joshua Taylor	OT	Mississippi Valley State	Released before regular season.
8	4	Tino Ellis	CB	Maryland	
9	5	Jameson Houston	CB	Baylor	
10	4	Dominique Martin	CB	Tarleton State	
11	5	Jalin Burrell	CB	New Mexico	
12	8	Paxton Lynch	QB	Memphis	
13	6	Quincy Adeboyejo	WR	Ole Miss	
14	3	Lance Lenoir	WR	Western Illinois	
15	6	Jeff Badet	WR	Oklahoma	
16	3	Ray Bolden	WR	Stony Brook	
18	3	Orion Stewart	S	Baylor	
19	6	Kieron Williams	S	Nebraska	
20	2	Sean Richard Pollard	C	Clemson	
21	7	Justin Lorenz Hughes	ILB	Kansas City	
21	11	Taiwan Jones	ILB	Michigan State	Compensatory selection.
22	8	Marquel Harrell	OG	Auburn	
23	1	Daishawn Dixon	OG	San Diego State	
24	1	TJ Carter	DT	Kentucky	
25	8	Jaquan Bailey	DT	Iowa State	
26	1	Kyshonn Tyson	DT	Grand Valley State	
27	4	Stevie Scott III	RB	Indiana	
28	5	Reggie Corbin	RB	Illinois	
29	5	Terry Myrick	OLB	Eastern Michigan	
30	4	Frank Ginda	OLB	San Jose State	
31	5	Tre Threat	OLB	Jacksonville State	Released before regular season.
33	6	Michael Carrizosa	P	San Jose State	
34	7	Joseph Magnifico	TE	Memphis	
34	11	La'Michael Pettway	TE	Iowa State	Compensatory selection.

=== Supplemental draft ===
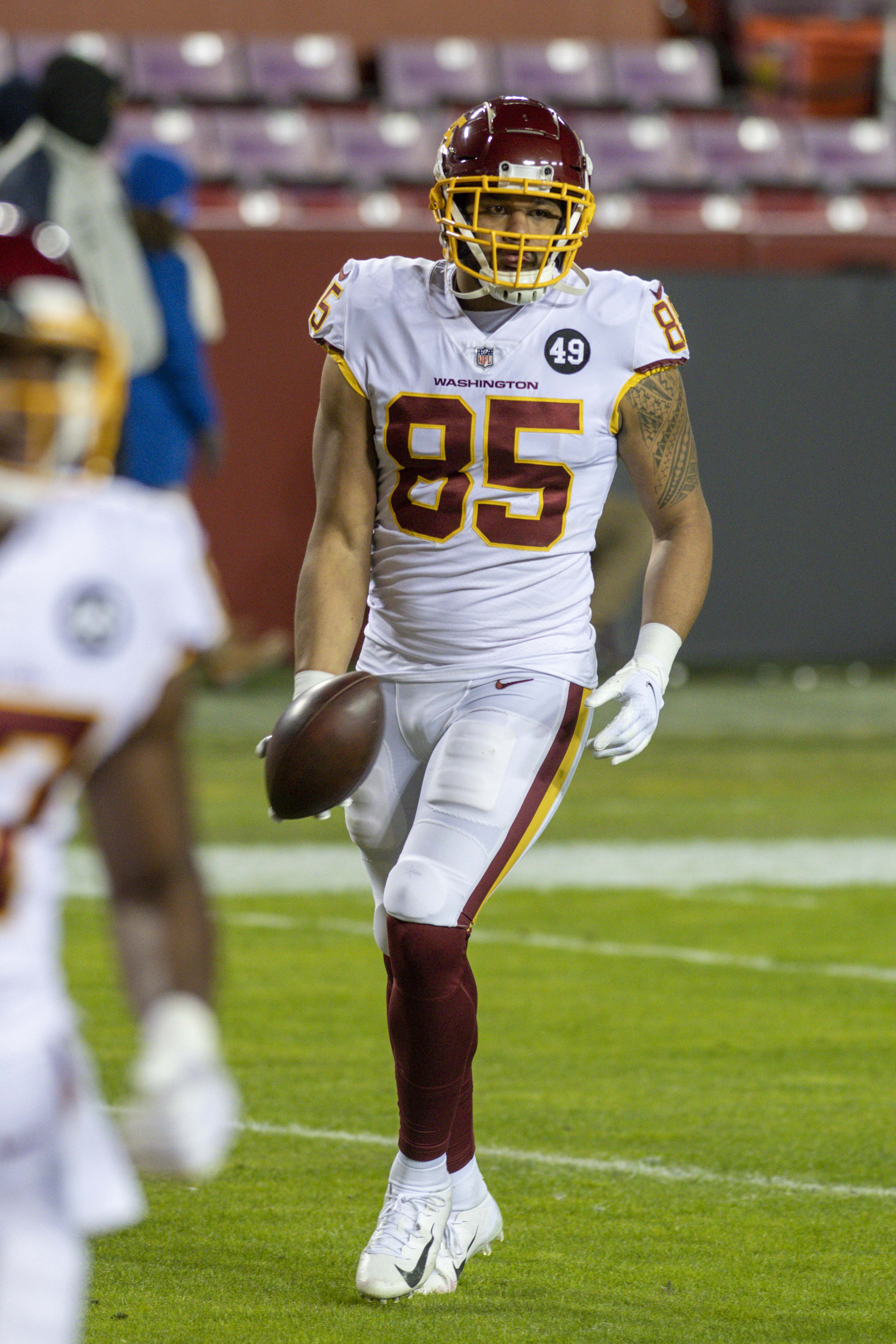
Marcus Baugh was selected in the third round of the supplemental draft. Baugh was on four NFL rosters but only received one ball in his NFL career.

2022 Michigan Panthers Supplemental Draft
Round	Selection	Player	Position	College	Notes
1	8	Warren Saba	DB	East Carolina	
2	1	Maea Teuhema	OG	Southeastern Louisiana	
3	4	Marcus Baugh	TE	Ohio State	
4	5	Sean Williams	OLB	Navy	
5	3	Cameron Scarlett	RB	Stanford	
6	6	Connor Davis	TE	Stony Brook	
7	7	Joseph Putu	CB	Florida	
8	2	Devin Ross	WR	Colorado	
9	3	Tejan Koroma	OG	BYU	
10	6	Shane Griffin	LS	West Chester	

=== Free agency ===
Position	Player	Former team	Date
OG	Cordel Iwuagwu	Cleveland Browns	April 1
DT	Walter Palmore	Carolina Panthers	April 1
OT	Syrus Tuitele	Fresno State Bulldogs	April 12

== Final roster ==
The Panthers, like all other teams, had a 38-man active roster with a 7-man practice squad.

2022 Michigan Panthers roster
Quarterbacks (QB): 18 Eric Barriere; 12 Paxton Lynch; Running backs (RB): 3 Reggie Corbin; 15 Cameron Scarlett; 25 Stevie Scott; 30 DeAndre Torrey; Wide receivers (WR): 13 Ishmael Hyman; 7 Lance Lenoir; 8 Joe Walker; Tight ends (TE): 85 Marcus Baugh; 88 Connor Davis; 17 Ryan O'Malley; 11 La'Michael Pettway	Offensive linemen (OL): 64 Josh Dunlop T; 79 Brodarious Hamm T; 54 Cordel Iwuagwu G; 56 Tejan Koroma G/C; 50 Teton Saltes T; 75 Maea Teuhema G; 77 Keith Williams T; Defensive linemen (DL): 55 Adewale Adeoye DE; 94 JaQuan Bailey DE; 96 T. J. Carter DT; 42 Vantrel McMillan DE; 99 Cavon Walker DT; 90 Ethan Westbrooks DT; 97 Tre Williams DE	Linebackers (LB): 4 Frank Ginda; 32 Justin Hughes; 44 Terry Myrick; 10 Alexander Vainikolo; Defensive backs (DB): 23 Jalin Burrell CB; 5 Tino Ellis CB; 1 Jameson Houston CB; 6 Sean Mahone S; 21 Dominique Martin CB; 14 Joseph Putu CB; 30 Cory Rahman S; Special teams (ST): 52 Shane Griffin LS; 35 Kyle Kramer P; 16 Cole Murphy K	Practice squad: 27 Eddie Graham CB; 19 Josh Love QB; 70 Walter Palmore DT; 76 Sean Pollard C; 2 Devin Ross WR; 9 Marcus Simms WR; 63 Syrus Tuitele T; 92 Kyshonn Tyson DE; 20 Kieron Williams S; 24 Sean Williams S; Reserve: Quincy Adeboyejo WR (DNR); Ray Bolden WR (DNR); Marquel Harrell G (DNR); Taiwan Jones DE (DNR); Rookies in italics 41 active, 4 reserve, 10 practice squad

== Staff ==
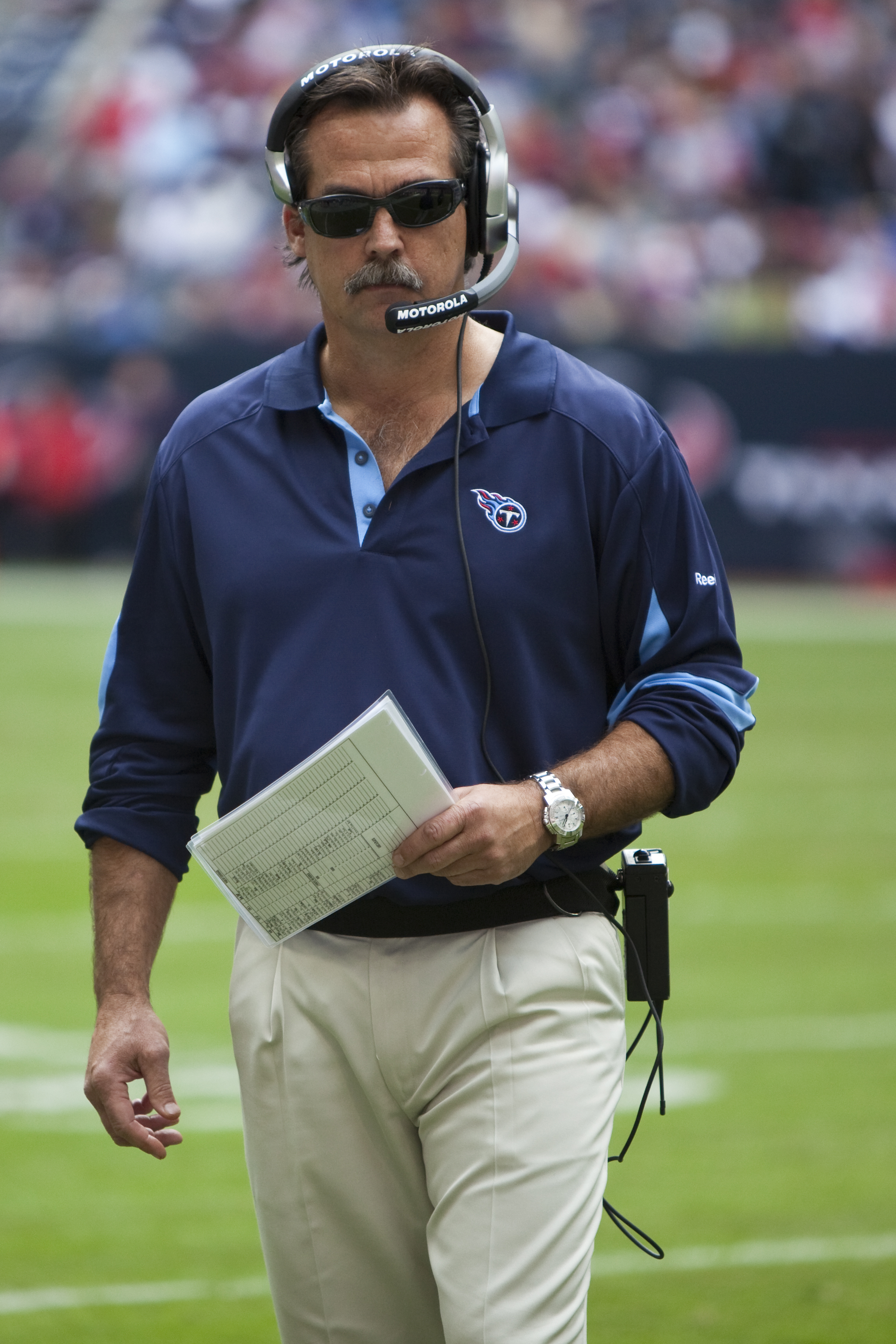
Jeff Fisher was chosen as the Panthers' head coach. As an NFL head coach, he led the Tennessee Titans to a Super Bowl appearance.

2022 Michigan Panthers staff
Front office: General manager – Jeff Fisher; Head coaches: Head coach – Jeff Fisher; Offensive coaches: Offensive coordinator – Eric Marty; Offensive line – Neil Callaway; Running backs – Mark Stewart	Defensive coaches: Defensive coordinator – Daniel Carrel; Defensive line – Kwahn Drake; Assistant defensive line – Tony Brown; Defensive backs/Special teams – Jeff Imamura

== Schedule ==
=== Regular season ===
The Panthers' 2022 schedule was announced on March 7. They opened the season against the Houston Gamblers.

Week	Date	Time (ET)	Opponent	Result	Record	TV	Recap
1	April 17	12:50 p.m.	Houston Gamblers*	**L** 12–17	0–1	NBC/Peacock	Recap
2	April 22	8:00 p.m.	**New Jersey Generals**	**L** 6–10	0–2	USA	Recap
3	May 1	2:30 p.m.	**Pittsburgh Maulers***	**W** 24–0	1–2	USA	Recap
4	May 6	10:20 p.m.	**Philadelphia Stars***	**L** 25–26	1–3	FS1	Recap
5	May 13	8:00 p.m.	Tampa Bay Bandits	**L** 20–27	1–4	USA	Recap
6	May 21	7:30 p.m.	Birmingham Stallions	**L** 17–33	1–5	NBC/Peacock	Recap
7	May 28	9:00 p.m.	New Orleans Breakers*	**L** 27–31 (OT)	1–6	FS1	Recap
8	June 5	12:00 p.m.	**Philadelphia Stars**	**L** 24–46	1–7	Fox	Recap
9	June 11	1:00 p.m.	**New Jersey Generals***	**L** 23–25	1–8	NBC/Peacock	Recap
10	June 19	12:00 p.m.	**Pittsburgh Maulers**	**W** 33–21	2–8	USA	Recap

Note: Intra-division opponents are in bold text. * mean that they host the game, since all eight teams play at the same stadium

=== Game summaries ===
==== Week 1: at Houston Gamblers ====
Week 1: Houston Gamblers at Michigan Panthers – Game summary

Quarter	1	2	3	4	Total
Gamblers	3	14	0	0	**17**
Panthers	0	0	6	6	**12**

at Protective Stadium, Birmingham, Alabama

- Date: April 17
- Game time: 12:50 p.m. EST (delayed)
- Referee: Bryan Banks
- TV announcers (NBC/Peacock): Jac Collinsworth, Jason Garrett, Lewis Johnson

Game information

**First quarter**

- HOU – Nick Vogel 37-yard field goal, 7:07. Houston 3–0. **Drive: 9 plays, 29 yards, 3:32.**

**Second quarter**

- HOU – Reggie Northrop 13-yard fumble return (Dalyn Dawkins rush), 15:00. Houston 11–0.
- HOU – Isaiah Zuber 12-yard pass from Clayton Thorson (Dalyn Dawkins rush failed), 5:08. Houston 17–0. **Drive: 6 plays, 65 yards, 3:00.**

**Third quarter**

- MICH – Lance Lenoir 8-yard pass from Shea Patterson (Shea Patterson pass failed), 9:42. Houston 17–6. **Drive: 10 plays, 74 yards, 5:25.**

**Fourth quarter**

- MICH – Stevie Scott III 3-yard rush (Stevie Scott III rush failed), 10:20. Houston 17–12. **Drive: 9 plays, 66 yards, 4:01.**

**Top passers**

- HOU – Clayton Thorson – 9/17, 73 yards, TD, INT
- MICH – Shea Patterson – 17/25, 192 yards, TD

**Top rushers**

- HOU – Mark Thompson – 13 rushes, 71 yards
- MICH – Stevie Scott III – 18 rushes, 72 yards, TD

**Top receivers**

- HOU – JoJo Ward – 7 receptions, 48 yards
- MICH – Lance Lenoir – 6 receptions, 71 yards, TD

The Panthers started their season against the Houston Gamblers. The Gamblers scored the only points of the first quarter on a 37-yard field goal by Nick Vogel. In the first play of the second quarter, the Panthers were poised to score the first touchdown at 2nd & goal before a Shea Patterson fumble was returned 90 yards for a touchdown by Gamblers Reggie Northrop which, after a successful 2-point conversion, put the Panthers down 0–11. The Panthers forced a Gamblers 3 and out, and on the ensuing punt, returned the punt 40 yards for touchdown. However, an unnecessary roughness call on the Panthers negated the touchdown, putting them on their own 45 yard line. The Gamblers stretched out their lead with a 65-yard drive topped off by an Isaiah Zuber 12-yard touchdown reception, putting the Panthers down 0–17 after a failed 2-point conversion.

We came out hot, on fire. We executed that first half. Second half, it got a little rocky. We had to get back, get our mindset right. A win is a win.

— Reggie Northrup, April 17, 2022, Fox Sports

The Panthers came out strong after halftime, driving 74 yards downfield for a touchdown. However, they missed the 2-point conversion, keeping the Panthers down 2 scores and a 6–17 deficit. They had a chance to put the game within 1 score with a 43-yard field goal, but it was missed. In the fourth quarter, the Panthers drove downfield 66 yards for the touchdown, which included a clutch 4th and 6. They again missed a 2-point conversion to put the game within 3. The Panthers had a chance to take the lead with 5:12 remaining in the 4th, but failed to convert a 4th and 26 with 0:09 remaining, and turned it over on downs to lose 12–17.

==== Week 2: at New Jersey Generals ====
Week 2: Michigan Panthers at New Jersey Generals – Game summary

Quarter	1	2	3	4	Total
Panthers	0	6	0	0	**6**
**Generals**	3	7	0	0	**10**

at Protective Stadium, Birmingham, Alabama

- Date: April 22
- Game time: 8:00 p.m. EST
- Referee: Duane Heydt
- TV announcers (USA): Paul Burmeister, Michael Robinson, Lewis Johnson

Game information

**First quarter**

- NJ – Nick Rose 21-yard field goal, 5:25. Generals 3–0. **Drive: 11 plays, 59 yards, 6:11.**

**Second quarter**

- MICH – Cameron Scarlett 4-yard rush (Michael Carrizosa kick failed), 13:39. Panthers 6–3. **Drive: 3 plays, 20 yards, 1:07.**
- NJ – Darius Victor 1-yard rush (Nick Rose kick good), 1:57. Generals 10–6. **Drive: 11 plays, 67 yards, 6:27.**

**Top passers**

- NJ – Luis Perez – 13/19, 97 yards, INT
- MICH – Shea Patterson – 14/29, 124 yards

**Top rushers**

- NJ – Darius Victor – 11 rushes, 40 yards, TD
- MICH – Stevie Scott III – 7 rushes, 25 yards

**Top receivers**

- NJ – Darrius Shepherd – 5 receptions, 58 yards
- MICH – Marcus Baugh – 3 receptions, 38 yards

The Panthers played against their division rival New Jersey Generals to open Week 2. The Generals struck first on a 21-yard field goal to put the Panthers down 0–3. In the second quarter, Panthers safety Orion Stewart intercepted Luis Perez and brought it back to the Generals 20 yard line. The Panthers capitalized, scoring a touchdown three plays later, putting the Panthers up 6–3. After trading punts, the Generals drove downfield that was capped off by a Darius Victor 1 yard rush, putting the Panthers down 6–10.

We've got to settle down at the quarterback spot. Offensively, we have an extra day this week, and we need it. We have got to figure out who we are and what we can do best, and focus in on those type of things.

— Panthers head coach, Jeff Fisher, April 22, 2022, Fox Sports

The Panthers received the ball to start the second half. They drove downfield on a 15 play, 53 yard drive that ate up more than half the third quarter. On the Generals 21 yard line, the Panthers attempted a 39-yard field goal, but it was missed. In the fourth quarter, the Generals had a chance to go up 13–6, but they also missed a 34-yard field goal. Both teams failed to score in the fourth quarter, ending up in a 6–10 Panthers loss, dropping to 0–2.

==== Week 3: vs. Pittsburgh Maulers ====
Week 3: Pittsburgh Maulers at Michigan Panthers – Game summary

Quarter	1	2	3	4	Total
Maulers	0	0	0	0	**0**
Panthers	16	0	0	8	**24**

at Protective Stadium, Birmingham, Alabama

- Date: May 1
- Game time: 2:30 p.m. EST
- Referee: Larry Smith
- TV announcers (USA): Jac Collinsworth, Jason Garrett, Corey Robinson

The Panthers played against division rival Pittsburgh Maulers in week 3. The Panthers earned their first win with a 24–0 shutout against the Maulers. The Panthers scored two touchdowns in the first half, one coming off an opening drive touchdown capped off by a 2-point conversion to bring the Panthers to 8–0. After a muffed punt by the Maulers which set the Panthers up at the Maulers 5 yard line. Three plays later, starting quarterback Paxton Lynch rushed for 1 yard, bringing the Panthers to a 1 score lead at 16–0.

We didn't throw it as well as we would have liked, but the passing game is complemented by the run game. Now I think people have respect for our run game.

— Panthers head coach, Jeff Fisher, May 1, 2022, Fox Sports

The teams did not score for forty-six minutes. In the fourth quarter, the Panthers scored off a 63-yard touchdown drive with a successful 2-point conversion, bringing the score to 24–0 for the Panthers, which would be the final score.

==== Week 4: vs. Philadelphia Stars ====
Week 4: Philadelphia Stars at Michigan Panthers – Game summary

Quarter	1	2	3	4	Total
Stars	0	0	0	0	**0**
Panthers	0	0	0	0	**0**

at Protective Stadium, Birmingham, Alabama

- Date: May 6
- Game time: 10:20 p.m. EST
- Referee: Bryan Banks
- TV announcers (FS1): Kevin Kugler, Mark Sanchez, Brock Huard

The Panthers will play against division rival Philadelphia Stars.

== Standings ==
North Division
#		W	L	PCT	GB	DIV	PF	PA	STK
1	(y) New Jersey Generals	9	1	.900	–	6–0	232	182	W9
2	(x) Philadelphia Stars	6	4	.600	3	4–2	262	243	L1
3	(e) Michigan Panthers	2	8	.200	7	2–4	211	236	W1
4	(e) Pittsburgh Maulers	1	9	.100	8	0–6	147	243	L5
(x)–clinched playoff berth; (y)–clinched division; (e)–eliminated from playoff contention

=== Postseason ===
After the 2022 USFL season, the Panthers ended up with a 2–8 record, as they were able to get the 1st round pick and the 1st pick of every other round in the 2023 USFL draft after beating 1–9 Pittsburgh Maulers in week 10. Michigan was eliminated from playoff contention after a 46–24 loss against the Philadelphia Stars.
