= Dondrea Tillman =

American football player (born 1998)

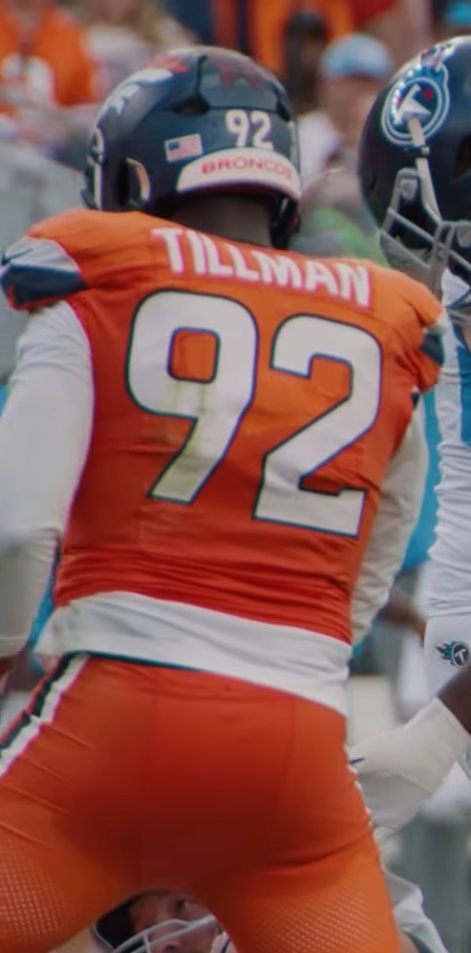
- Tillman with the Denver Broncos in 2025

No. 92 – Denver Broncos
- Position: Outside linebacker
- Roster status: Active

Personal information
- Born: April 30, 1998 (age 28); Sterling, Virginia, U.S.
- Listed height: 6 ft 4 in (1.93 m)
- Listed weight: 247 lb (112 kg)

Career information
- High school: Potomac Falls (Potomac Falls, Virginia)
- College: IUP (2016–2021)
- NFL draft: 2022: undrafted

Career history
- Birmingham Stallions (2022–2024); Denver Broncos (2024–present)

Awards and highlights
- UFL champion (2024); 2× USFL champion (2022, 2023); 2× First-team All-PSAC West (2018, 2019); Second-team All-PSAC West (2017); Third-team All-Super Region One (2018)

Career NFL statistics as of Week 7, 2026
- Tackles: 82
- Sacks: 9
- Pass deflections: 3
- Interceptions: 2
- Stats at Pro Football Reference

Dondrea Tillman (/ˈdɑːndreɪ/ DAHN-dray; born April 30, 1998) is an American professional football outside linebacker for the Denver Broncos of the National Football League (NFL). He played college football for the IUP Crimson Hawks. Tillman has also played for the Birmingham Stallions of the United Football League (UFL).

== Early life ==
Tillman was born on April 30, 1998, in Sterling, Virginia. While attending Potomac Falls High School, he played both tight end and defensive line.

== College career ==
Tillman played Division II college football at Indiana University of Pennsylvania from 2017 to 2021, where he collected 174 tackles, 30 sacks, 10 passes defended and seven forced fumbles in 48 career games.

== Professional career ==
Pre-draft measurables
Height	Weight
6 ft 3 1/4 in (1.91 m)	247 lb (112 kg)
Values from Pro Day

=== Birmingham Stallions ===
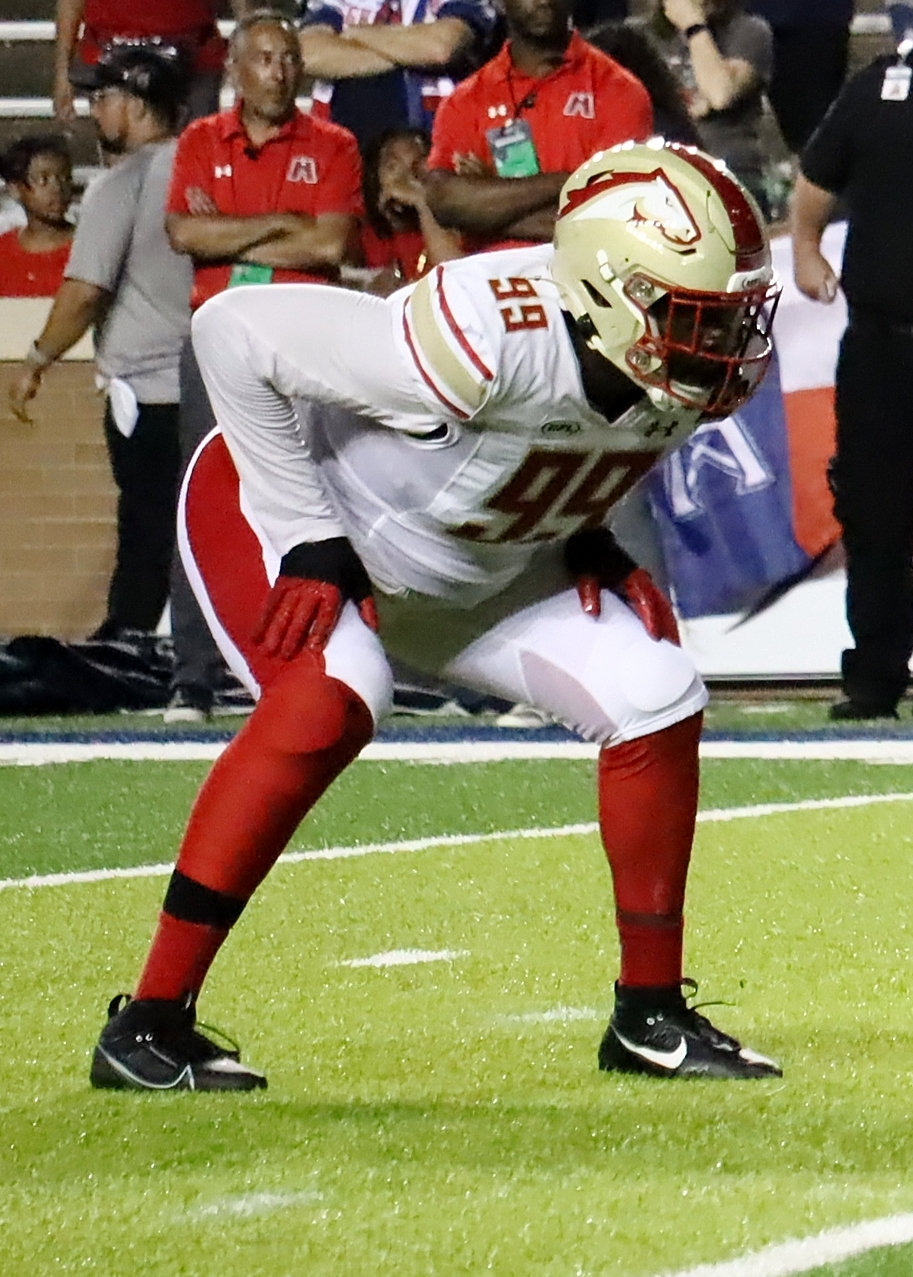
Tillman with the Birmingham Stallions in 2024

On March 10, 2022, Tillman was selected in the third supplemental round of the 2022 USFL draft by the Birmingham Stallions. In three seasons with the Stallions, Tillman recorded over 66 tackles, and 5.5 sacks. His contract was terminated on June 19, 2024, to sign with an NFL team. In total, he won three championships with the Stallions: two in the USFL and one in the UFL.

=== Denver Broncos ===
On June 20, 2024, Tillman signed with the Denver Broncos. On August 27, he was waived by the Broncos. The next day, he was re-signed to the practice squad. On September 18, Tillman was promoted to the active roster after placing Mike McGlinchey on injured reserve. Tillman made his NFL debut in Week 3 of the 2024 season against the Tampa Bay Buccaneers. During the game, he recorded two sacks.

On March 4, 2025, the Broncos assigned his exclusive-rights free agent tender, keeping him under contract through the 2025 season. Tillman recorded his first career interception in Week 8 of 2025, returning it 36 yards after breaking multiple tackles.

On March 6, 2026, the Broncos once again assigned his ERFA tender, this time worth $1.075 million.

== Career statistics ==
=== USFL/UFL regular season ===
Year	Team	Games		Tackles					Fumbles				Interceptions				
Year	Team	GP	GS	Cmb	Solo	Ast	Sck	TFL	FF	FR	Yds	TD	Int	Yds	Lng	TD	PD
2022	BHAM	10	10	34	20	14	1.5	—	0	0	—	0	0	—	—	0	0
2023	BHAM	10	10	32	12	20	4.0	—	0	0	—	0	0	—	—	0	0
2024	BHAM	10	10	26	19	7	3.0	—	0	0	—	0	0	—	—	0	0
Career		30	30	92	51	41	8.5	—	0	0	—	0	0	—	—	0	0

=== USFL/UFL postseason ===
Year	Team	Games		Tackles					Fumbles				Interceptions				
Year	Team	GP	GS	Cmb	Solo	Ast	Sck	TFL	FF	FR	Yds	TD	Int	Yds	Lng	TD	PD
2022	BHAM	2	2	6	5	1	1.0	—	0	0	—	0	0	—	—	0	0
2023	BHAM	2	2	3	3	0	1.0	—	0	0	—	0	0	—	—	0	0
2024	BHAM	2	2	7	3	4	2.0	—	0	0	—	0	0	—	—	0	0
Career		6	6	16	11	5	4.0	—	0	0	—	0	0	—	—	0	0

=== NFL regular season ===
Year	Team	Games		Tackles					Fumbles				Interceptions				
Year	Team	GP	GS	Cmb	Solo	Ast	Sck	TFL	FF	FR	Yds	TD	Int	Yds	Lng	TD	PD
2024	DEN	12	0	23	13	10	5.0	5	0	0	—	0	0	—	—	0	0
2025	DEN	17	0	41	13	28	4.0	3	0	0	—	0	2	59	36	0	3
Career		29	0	64	26	38	9.0	8	0	0	—	0	2	59	36	0	3

=== NFL postseason ===
Year	Team	Games		Tackles					Fumbles				Interceptions				
Year	Team	GP	GS	Cmb	Solo	Ast	Sck	TFL	FF	FR	Yds	TD	Int	Yds	Lng	TD	PD
2024	DEN	1	0	7	3	4	0.0	0	0	0	—	0	0	—	—	0	0
2025	DEN	2	0	9	5	4	0.0	1	0	0	—	0	0	—	—	0	0
Career		3	0	16	8	8	0.0	1	0	0	—	0	0	—	—	0	0
