= Victor Bolden Jr. =

American football player (born 1995)

Profile
- Position: Wide receiver

Personal information
- Born: April 4, 1995 (age 31); Fontana, California, U.S.
- Listed height: 5 ft 8 in (1.73 m)
- Listed weight: 178 lb (81 kg)

Career information
- High school: Los Osos (Rancho Cucamonga, California)
- College: Oregon State (2013–2016)
- NFL draft: 2017: undrafted

Career history
- San Francisco 49ers (2017–2018); Buffalo Bills (2018); Detroit Lions (2019–2020)*; Birmingham Stallions (2022); Arizona Cardinals (2022)*; Denver Broncos (2022)*; Arlington Renegades (2023); Houston Texans (2023)*; Birmingham Stallions (2024)*; BC Lions (2025)*
- * Offseason or practice squad member only

Awards and highlights
- XFL champion (2023); USFL champion (2022); USFL Championship Game MVP (2022); All-USFL Team (2022) (Note: Selected as a wide receiver and special teamer)

Career NFL statistics
- Receptions: 1
- Receiving yards: 10
- Return yards: 535
- Stats at Pro Football Reference

Victor Vaughn Bolden Jr. (born April 4, 1995) is an American professional football wide receiver. He played college football at Oregon State, and signed with the San Francisco 49ers as an undrafted free agent in 2017. In 2022, with the Stallions, he won MVP of the Championship game versus the Philadelphia Stars.

== College career ==
Bolden appeared in 48 games with 36 career starts in his for seasons at Oregon State. In 2013, Bolden led the FBS with 58 kickoff returns and was second in yards with 1,198. He also returned a kickoff for a touchdown against Washington in a game he totaled a career high 305 return yards. In Bolden's only career bowl appearance, Oregon State defeated Boise State in the Hawaii Bowl. In 2014, Bolden recorded double digit receptions in four of the 12 games he played, including a career high of 11 against both Hawaii and CAL. In 2015, Bolden returned his first career punt return for a touchdown in the season finale against rival Oregon. Bolden finished his collegiate career ranked sixth in receptions and ninth in receiving yards for the Beavers. He also finished with six 100-yard receiving performances. Bolden finished third all-time at Oregon state with 5,196 all-purpose yards and holds the school record with 2,420 kickoff return yards.

=== statistics ===
| Season | Team | Games | | Receiving | | | | Rushing | | | | Kick returns | | | | Punt returns | | | |
| Season | Team | GP | GS | Rec | Yds | Avg | TD | Att | Yds | Avg | TD | Ret | Yds | Avg | TD | Ret | Yds | Avg | TD |
|---|---|---|---|---|---|---|---|---|---|---|---|---|---|---|---|---|---|---|---|
| 2013 | Oregon State | 13 | 2 | 6 | 62 | 10.3 | 0 | 12 | 95 | 7.9 | 1 | 58 | 1,198 | 20.7 | 1 | — | — | — | — |
| 2014 | Oregon State | 11 | 11 | 72 | 798 | 11.1 | 2 | 19 | 118 | 6.2 | 0 | — | — | — | — | 4 | 44 | 11.0 | 0 |
| 2015 | Oregon State | 12 | 12 | 46 | 461 | 10.0 | 3 | 36 | 185 | 5.1 | 0 | 23 | 580 | 25.2 | 1 | 1 | 78 | 78.0 | 1 |
| 2016 | Oregon State | 12 | 11 | 46 | 542 | 11.8 | 2 | 28 | 329 | 11.8 | 2 | 27 | 642 | 23.8 | 1 | 14 | 64 | 4.6 | 0 |
| Career | | 48 | 36 | 170 | 1,863 | 11.0 | 7 | 95 | 727 | 7.7 | 3 | 108 | 2,420 | 22.4 | 3 | 19 | 186 | 9.8 | 1 |

== Professional career ==
=== San Francisco 49ers ===
Bolden signed with the San Francisco 49ers as an undrafted free agent on May 4, 2017.

In Week 2, against the Seattle Seahawks, Bolden had three kickoff returns for 71 total yards in his NFL debut. On December 13, 2017, Bolden was placed on injured reserve with an ankle injury.

On June 1, 2018, Bolden was suspended the first four games of the 2018 season for violating the league's policy on performance-enhancing substances.

On October 30, 2018, Bolden was waived by the 49ers and re-signed to the practice squad.

=== Buffalo Bills ===
On December 18, 2018, Bolden was signed by the Buffalo Bills off the 49ers practice squad. He was waived on August 31, 2019.

=== Detroit Lions ===
On December 3, 2019, Bolden was signed to the Detroit Lions practice squad. On December 30, 2019, Bolden was signed to a reserve/future contract.

On September 5, 2020, Bolden was waived by the Lions and signed to the practice squad the next day. He was released on September 9, and re-signed to the practice squad on October 13. He signed a reserve/future contract on January 5, 2021.

On August 31, 2021, Bolden was waived.

=== Birmingham Stallions (first stint) ===
Bolden was selected with the first pick of the 13th round of the 2022 USFL draft by the Birmingham Stallions.

On June 16, 2022, Bolden was named as a Wide Receiver and Special Team All-USFL Team.

On July 3, 2022, he received the MVP award of the USFL championship game for his efforts during the Stallions victory over the Philadelphia Stars.

=== Arizona Cardinals ===
On July 22, 2022, Bolden signed with the Arizona Cardinals. He was waived on August 30, 2022, and signed to the practice squad the next day. He was placed on the practice squad/injured list on September 14, 2022. He was released on September 20.

=== Denver Broncos ===
On November 15, 2022, Bolden was signed to the Denver Broncos' practice squad. He signed a reserve/future contract on January 9, 2023. He was waived on March 14, 2023.

=== Arlington Renegades ===
Bolden signed with the Arlington Renegades of the XFL on March 22, 2023. He was released from his contract on August 13, 2023.

=== Houston Texans ===
Bolden signed with the Houston Texans on August 13, 2023, but was waived the next day.

=== Birmingham Stallions (second stint) ===
Bolden re-signed with the Stallions on September 25, 2023. He was removed from the team's roster on March 21, 2024.

=== BC Lions ===
On March 27, 2025, Bolden signed with the BC Lions of the Canadian Football League (CFL). He was released on May 2, 2025.

== Career statistics ==
=== NFL Regular season ===
| Year | Team | Games | | Receiving | | | | | Kickoff returns | | | | | Punt returns | | | | |
| Year | Team | GP | GS | Rec | Yds | Avg | Lng | TD | Att | Yds | Avg | Lng | TD | Att | Yds | Avg | Lng | TD |
|---|---|---|---|---|---|---|---|---|---|---|---|---|---|---|---|---|---|---|
| 2017 | SF | 9 | 0 | 0 | 0 | 0.0 | 0 | 0 | 19 | 396 | 20.8 | 34 | 0 | 4 | 23 | 5.8 | 16 | 0 |
| 2018 | SF | 4 | 0 | 1 | 10 | 10.0 | 10 | 0 | 0 | 0 | 0.0 | 0 | 0 | 0 | 0 | 0.0 | 0 | 0 |
| 2018 | BUF | 2 | 0 | 0 | 0 | 0.0 | 0 | 0 | 5 | 116 | 23.2 | 28 | 0 | 0 | 0 | 0.0 | 0 | 0 |
| Career | | 15 | 0 | 1 | 10 | 10.0 | 10 | 0 | 24 | 512 | 21.3 | 34 | 0 | 4 | 23 | 5.8 | 16 | 0 |

=== USFL/XFL career statistics ===
Legend
| | Championship Game MVP |
| | Led the league |
| | League champion |
| **Bold** | Career high |

==== Regular season ====
| Year | Team | League | Games | | Receiving | | | | | Kickoff returns | | | | | Punt returns | | | | |
| Year | Team | League | GP | GS | Rec | Yds | Avg | Lng | TD | Ret | Yds | Avg | Lng | TD | Ret | Yds | Avg | Lng | TD |
|---|---|---|---|---|---|---|---|---|---|---|---|---|---|---|---|---|---|---|---|
| 2022 | BHAM | USFL | 9 | 9 | 42 | 415 | 9.9 | 53 | 1 | 25 | 618 | 24.7 | 41 | 0 | 21 | 176 | 8.4 | 28 | 0 |
| 2023 | ARL | XFL | 2 | 0 | 3 | 40 | 13.3 | 18 | 0 | 1 | 26 | 26.0 | 26 | 0 | 1 | -2 | -2.0 | -2 | 0 |
| Career | | | 11 | 9 | 45 | 455 | 10.1 | 53 | 7 | 26 | 644 | 24.8 | 41 | 0 | 22 | 174 | 7.9 | 28 | 0 |

==== Postseason ====
| Year | Team | League | Games | | Receiving | | | | | Kickoff returns | | | | | Punt returns | | | | |
| Year | Team | League | GP | GS | Rec | Yds | Avg | Lng | TD | Ret | Yds | Avg | Lng | TD | Ret | Yds | Avg | Lng | TD |
|---|---|---|---|---|---|---|---|---|---|---|---|---|---|---|---|---|---|---|---|
| 2022 | BHAM | USFL | 2 | 2 | 7 | 66 | 9.4 | 19 | 1 | 7 | 258 | 36.9 | 90 | 1 | 2 | 0 | 0.0 | 0 | 0 |
| 2023 | ARL | XFL | 1 | 0 | 1 | 8 | 8.0 | 8 | 0 | 0 | 0 | 0.0 | 0 | 0 | 1 | 9 | 9.0 | 9 | 0 |
| Career | | | 3 | 2 | 8 | 74 | 9.3 | 19 | 1 | 7 | 258 | 36.9 | 90 | 1 | 3 | 9 | 3.0 | 9 | 0 |
