= J'Mar Smith =

American football player (born 1996)

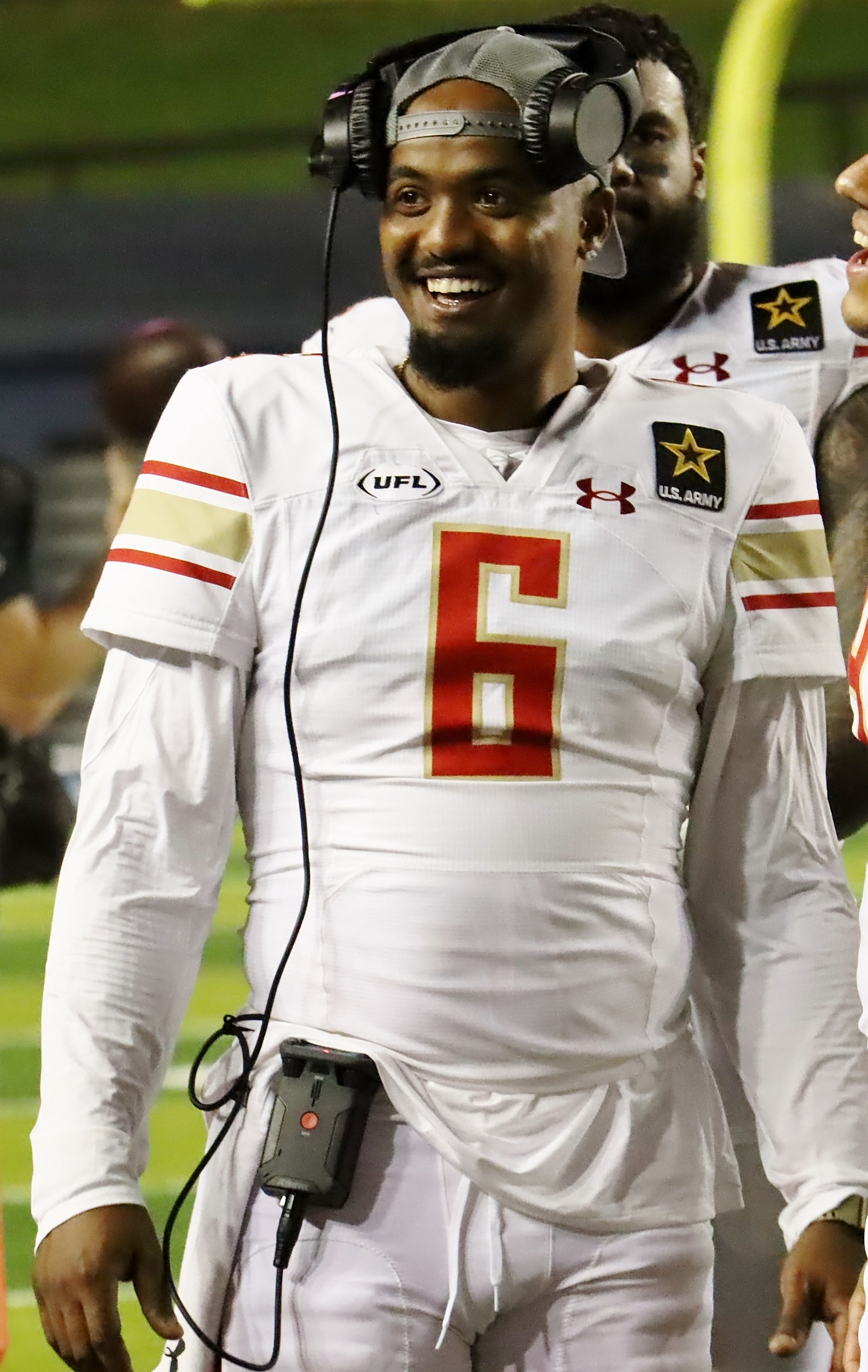
- Smith with the Birmingham Stallions in 2024

Profile
- Position: Quarterback

Personal information
- Born: September 24, 1996 (age 30); Meridian, Mississippi, U.S.
- Listed height: 6 ft 1 in (1.85 m)
- Listed weight: 218 lb (99 kg)

Career information
- High school: Meridian
- College: Louisiana Tech (2016–2019)
- NFL draft: 2020: undrafted

Career history
- New England Patriots (2020)*; Hamilton Tiger-Cats (2021)*; Birmingham Stallions (2022–2025)
- * Offseason or practice squad member only

Awards and highlights
- 2× USFL champion (2022, 2023); UFL champion (2024); C-USA Offensive Player of the Year (2019); First-team All-C-USA

Career spring football statistics as of Week 8, 2025
- Passing attempts: 286
- Passing completions: 158
- Completion percentage: 55.2
- TD–INT: 14–8
- Passing yards: 2,058
- QBR: 82.8
- Stats at CFL.ca

Jamarius "J'Mar" Smith (born September 24, 1996) is an American professional football quarterback. He played college football at Louisiana Tech.

== Early life ==
A multi-sport athlete, Smith was a three-star recruit out of Meridian High School in Meridian, Mississippi. At Meridian, he was teammates with Miami Dolphins defensive tackle Raekwon Davis. He accepted a full-scholarship from Louisiana Tech over offers from Mississippi State and Memphis. He was recruited to Louisiana Tech by former NFL quarterback Tim Rattay.

Smith played as a catcher for the Meridian baseball team. He was selected by the San Diego Padres of Major League Baseball (MLB) in the 24th round of the 2015 MLB draft, but he declined to sign a professional contract with the team.

== College career ==
As a redshirt senior, Smith started 11 games and was 236-of-367 passing for 2,977 yards and 18 touchdowns on the season. During his redshirt senior season, Smith was suspended for two games for violating athletic department policy. Smith led his team to a 14–0 win over Miami in the 2019 Walk On's Independence Bowl and was named Conference USA's 2019 Football Offensive Player of the Year.

=== Statistics ===
Season	Team	Games			Passing							Rushing			
Season	Team	GP	GS	Record	Cmp	Att	Pct	Yds	TD	Int	Rtg	Att	Yds	Avg	TD
2015	Louisiana Tech	0	0	—	Redshirted (redshirt)										
2016	Louisiana Tech	8	1	0–1	30	43	69.8	412	2	1	160.9	17	62	3.6	2
2017	Louisiana Tech	13	13	7–6	229	409	56.0	2,974	16	5	127.5	120	378	3.2	6
2018	Louisiana Tech	13	13	8–5	264	461	57.3	3,160	15	10	121.2	90	173	1.9	3
2019	Louisiana Tech	11	11	10–1	236	367	64.3	2,977	18	5	145.9	100	264	2.6	4
Career		45	38	25–13	759	1,280	59.3	9,523	51	21	131.7	327	877	2.7	15

== Professional career ==
Pre-draft measurables
Height	Weight
6 ft 0 1/4 in (1.84 m)	218 lb (99 kg)
All values from Pro Day

=== New England Patriots ===
On May 5, 2020, Smith signed as an undrafted free agent with the New England Patriots. On July 26, he was waived by the Patriots before the start of training camp.

Smith had a tryout with the Green Bay Packers on August 23, 2020.

=== Hamilton Tiger-Cats ===
He signed with the Hamilton Tiger-Cats of the CFL on May 17, 2021. He was assigned to the practice roster as the 4th string quarterback. Smith was released by the Tiger-Cats on August 21.

=== Birmingham Stallions ===
Smith was selected in the 12th round of the 2022 USFL draft by the Birmingham Stallions, reuniting with his college head coach Skip Holtz. After leading the Stallions to a victory over the New Jersey Generals in the USFL Kickoff game, Smith was voted USFL Week 1 offensive player of the week. On July 3, Smith won the USFL championship game.

Smith was placed on injured reserve by the team on April 19, 2023, following a torn ligament in his right hand. He re-signed with the team on August 11, and again on August 20, 2024. Smith largely took a backup role in the 2024 season, a role that left him unhappy and prompted him to briefly retire prior to the 2025 training camp and take a job working at Dunkin', the only company that would hire him because he reserved the possibility of returning to professional football.

Smith re-signed with the Stallions on April 24, 2025, following a series of injuries to starters Alex McGough, Andrew Peasley and Matt Corral. He was released on April 28 but re-signed again on May 2. In week 9, Smith went 22-of-31 for 307 yards and 2 touchdowns and was announced as the UFL Offensive Player of the Week. Smith started the 2025 UFL Conference Championship but was benched during the game in favor of Corral.

On August 22, 2025, in a move that coincided with the announcement that the Birmingham Stallions were safe from a possible relocation, Smith re-signed with the Stallions for the 2026 season. He resigned from the team and league in mid-December after the league announced plans to liquidate all eight teams' rosters and force all players under UFL contract into a centralized reallocation process, a move that also coincided with Holtz's resignation.

== Career statistics ==
Legend
	Won the championship
	Led the league
**Bold**	Career high

=== Regular season ===
Year	Team	League	Games			Passing								Rushing			
Year	Team	League	GP	GS	Record	Cmp	Att	Pct	Yds	Y/A	TD	Int	Rtg	Att	Yds	Avg	TD
2022	BHAM	USFL	9	7	6–1	131	239	54.8	1,573	6.6	10	6	78.7	38	191	5.0	2
2023	BHAM	USFL	1	1	1–0	10	15	66.7	160	10.7	1	1	96.5	2	1	0.5	0
2024	BHAM	UFL	4	0	—	0	0	0.0	0	0.0	0	0	0.0	0	0	0.0	0
2025	BHAM	UFL	4	3	2–1	52	80	65.0	759	9.5	6	1	115.6	22	86	3.9	1
Career			18	11	9–2	193	334	57.7	2,492	7.5	17	8	88.3	62	279	4.5	3

=== Postseason ===
Year	Team	League	Games			Passing								Rushing			
Year	Team	League	GP	GS	Record	Cmp	Att	Pct	Yds	Y/A	TD	Int	Rtg	Att	Yds	Avg	TD
2022	BHAM	USFL	2	2	2–0	27	45	60.0	321	7.1	2	0	96.6	8	50	6.3	1
2023	BHAM	USFL	0	0	—	Did not play due to injury											
2024	BHAM	UFL	2	0	—	0	0	0.0	0	0.0	0	0	0.0	0	0	0.0	0
Career			4	2	2–0	27	45	60.0	321	7.1	2	0	96.6	8	50	6.3	1

== Personal life ==
J'Mar Smith is the son of former NFL defensive lineman Kenny Smith, who played with the New Orleans Saints and Kansas City Chiefs. During his first season with the Birmingham Stallions, Smith was awarded Birmingham Stallions Best Hair Award by his teammates as a joke.
