= O'Shea Dugas =

American football player (born 1996)

Profile
- Position: Offensive tackle

Personal information
- Born: September 22, 1996 (age 30); Lafayette, Louisiana, U.S.
- Listed height: 6 ft 4 in (1.93 m)
- Listed weight: 335 lb (152 kg)

Career information
- High school: Lafayette (LA) Northside
- College: Louisiana Tech
- NFL draft: 2019: undrafted

Career history
- Cincinnati Bengals (2019–2020); Edmonton Elks (2021); Birmingham Stallions (2022–2024); Memphis Showboats (2025)

Awards and highlights
- 2× USFL champion (2022, 2023); UFL champion (2024)
- Stats at Pro Football Reference

O'Shea Deon Dugas (born September 22, 1996) is an American professional football offensive tackle. He played college football at Louisiana Tech.

== College career ==
After graduating high school, he chose Louisiana Tech over Louisiana-Lafayette, Louisiana-Monroe, Memphis, Nevada, Southern Miss, and Tulane. At Louisiana Tech he earned Second-team All-Conference from 2016 to 2017, and First-team All Conference in 2018. He was also on the Conference USA All-Freshman Team in 2015.

== Professional career ==
Pre-draft measurables
Height	Weight	Arm length	Hand span	40-yard dash	10-yard split	20-yard split	20-yard shuttle	Three-cone drill	Vertical jump	Broad jump	Bench press
6 ft 4 3/8 in (1.94 m)	330 lb (150 kg)	37 1/4 in (0.95 m)	10 1/8 in (0.26 m)	5.41 s	1.89 s	3.16 s	5.03 s	8.04 s	28.0 in (0.71 m)	8 ft 3 in (2.51 m)	17 reps
All values from Pro Day

=== Cincinnati Bengals ===
After going undrafted in 2019 he was signed by the Cincinnati Bengals on May 10, 2019. On September 2, 2019, he was placed on injury reserve due to a knee injury during preseason. He was waived on September 3, 2020. On November 11, 2020, he was signed to the practice squad.

=== Edmonton Elks ===
Dugas was added to the active roster of the Edmonton Elks of the CFL on July 9, 2021. He did not play in a regular season game for the Elks and was released on July 29, 2021.

=== Birmingham Stallions ===
Dugas was selected in the 6th round of the 2022 USFL draft by the Birmingham Stallions. After being ruled out for week 1 with a back injury, he was transferred to the team's practice squad on April 14, 2022. He was transferred back to the active roster on April 22.

Dugas re-signed with the team on July 20, 2023. He was waived on March 22, 2024. He re-signed with the team on April 2, 2024. He re-signed with the Stallions again on August 14, 2024. He was released on February 17, 2025.

=== Memphis Showboats ===
On March 8, 2025, Dugas signed with the Memphis Showboats of the United Football League (UFL). He was released on April 16.
