= Shea Patterson =

American gridiron football player (born 1997)

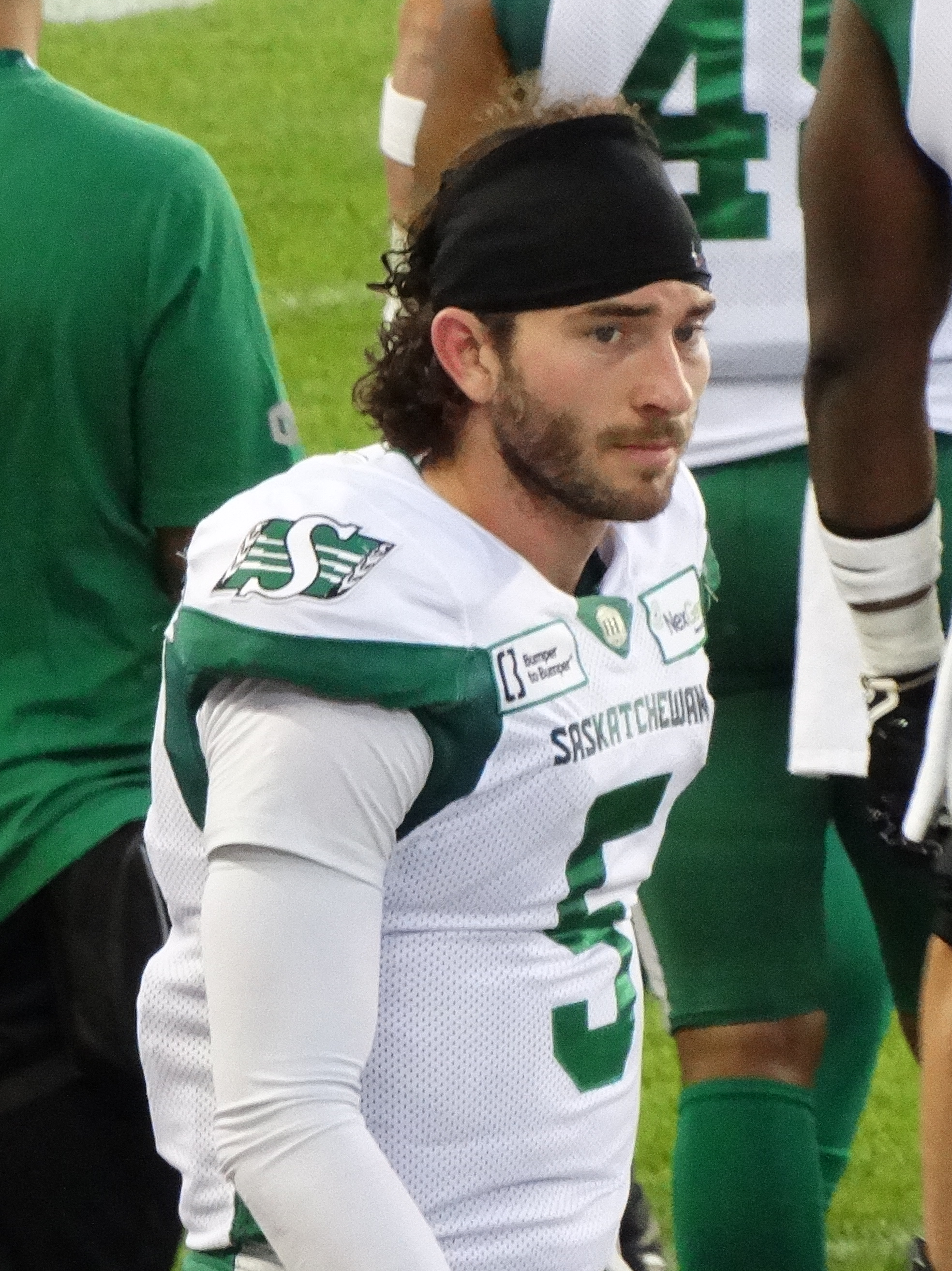
- Patterson with the Saskatchewan Roughriders in 2024

Profile
- Position: Quarterback

Personal information
- Born: January 17, 1997 (age 29); Toledo, Ohio, U.S.
- Listed height: 6 ft 1 in (1.85 m)
- Listed weight: 202 lb (92 kg)

Career information
- High school: IMG Academy (Bradenton, Florida)
- College: Ole Miss (2016–2017); Michigan (2018–2019)
- NFL draft: 2020: undrafted

Career history
- Kansas City Chiefs (2020)*; BC Lions (2021)*; Montreal Alouettes (2021); Michigan Panthers (2022); New Orleans Breakers (2022); Saskatchewan Roughriders (2023–2024); Winnipeg Blue Bombers (2025)*; Montreal Alouettes (2025)
- * Offseason or practice squad member only

Awards and highlights
- 2× Third-team All-Big Ten (2018, 2019)

Career USFL statistics
- Passing attempts: 176
- Passing completions: 106
- Completion percentage: 60%
- TD–INT: 4–5
- Passing yards: 1,020
- Passer rating: 72.2

Career CFL statistics as of 2025
- Games played: 44
- Passing completions–attempts: 135–224
- Passing yards: 1,687
- TD–INT: 6–5
- Passer rating: 83.3
- Stats at CFL.ca

Shea Christopher Patterson (born January 17, 1997) is an American professional football quarterback. He most recently played for the Montreal Alouettes of the Canadian Football League (CFL). He played college football for the Ole Miss Rebels (2016–2017) and the Michigan Wolverines (2018–2019). He was signed by the Kansas City Chiefs as an undrafted free agent in 2020. He was drafted in the 2018 Major League Baseball draft by the Texas Rangers and they retained his rights until 2024. The Michigan Panthers drafted Patterson with the first pick in the 2022 USFL draft. He has also played with the New Orleans Breakers of the United States Football League (USFL).

Patterson was considered among the top 5 high school class of 2016 football prospects in the entire country. He earned the Pete Dawkins Trophy as a high school senior. Patterson began his college football career at the University of Mississippi (Ole Miss) before transferring to the University of Michigan. Among his collegiate highlights are the Ole Miss single-game passing yards record and the Michigan records for single-game (regulation) passing touchdowns, consecutive 300-yard passing games and consecutive 4-touchdown passing games. His senior season passing yardage total was second in school history. He was a two-time third-team All-Big Ten Conference selection.

== Early life ==
Patterson grew up in Toledo, Ohio before moving to Brownsville, Texas for a few years and then to nearby Hidalgo to attend Hidalgo High School as a freshman in 2012. In December of that year, he committed to the University of Arizona to play college football. After his freshman year, his family moved to Shreveport, Louisiana after his father moved the family for a new job. In Shreveport, he attended Calvary Baptist Academy, where he was a standout on the football team. Patterson threw for 2,655 yards with 34 touchdowns as a sophomore and 2,428 passing yards, 38 touchdowns as a junior. In July 2014, he decommitted from Arizona. In February 2015, he committed to the University of Mississippi (Ole Miss). In 2015, Patterson transferred to IMG Academy in Bradenton, Florida for his senior year.

Patterson was regarded as a 5-star prospect by Scout, Rivals, and 247Sports, and a 4-star by ESPN. He was the highest rated recruit at his position by all four recruiting services (as a pro-style quarterback on 247Sports and Scout, and a dual-threat quarterback by Rivals and ESPN). Patterson was the 4th-highest rated recruit overall in the class of 2016 on the 247Sports Composite, which aggregates the ratings of the four recruiting services.

== College career ==
=== Ole Miss ===
==== 2016 ====
Patterson enrolled early at the University of Mississippi (Ole Miss) and was tabbed as the second quarterback on the depth chart, along with second-year freshman Jason Pellerin, going into 2016 fall camp.

With Chad Kelly as the starting quarterback, Patterson was slated to sit out 2016 as a redshirt freshman. He became the starting quarterback after Kelly tore his ACL, losing Patterson's redshirt season. Patterson made his debut on November 12, 2016, leading the Rebels to a comeback victory over Texas A&M while completing 25 of 42 pass attempts for 338 yards, two touchdowns, and an interception. His first career touchdown was a six-yard pass to wide receiver Damore'ea Stringfellow. Later in the game, Patterson cut the Aggies' lead to 28–26 when he threw a 32-yard touchdown pass to Van Jefferson with 5:17 remaining in the game. The Rebels went ahead with a 39-yard field goal with only 37 seconds remaining, and the score would hold.

The following week, Patterson earned his second career start, against Vanderbilt, and completed 20 of 42 pass attempts for 222 yards and two touchdowns during the Rebels' 38–17 loss. On November 27, 2016, Patterson completed 27 of 48 pass attempts for 320 passing yards and two touchdowns and two interceptions in a 55–20 loss to Mississippi State. He finished his true freshman season completing 72 of 132 pass attempts for 880 passing yards, six touchdowns, and three interceptions in three starts and one victory.

==== 2017 ====
Patterson was named the starter for Ole Miss heading into the 2017 season as a sophomore. Before the season began, Ole Miss was mired in controversy due to an NCAA investigation that found numerous violations of organization rules, including a lack of institutional control. In response, in February 2017, Ole Miss self-imposed a bowl ban for the 2017 season. In another controversy, Ole Miss head coach Hugh Freeze resigned in July 2017 after it was reported that he made several calls to escort services using university phones. Co-offensive coordinator/offensive line coach Matt Luke was named interim head coach.

In the first two games of the season, Shea garnered national attention by throwing for a combined 918 yards and 9 touchdown passes against South Alabama and UT Martin. In his game against UT Martin, he set the Ole Miss school record for passing yards in a single game with 489 yards. Patterson's success began to taper, however, as the Rebels lost four of their next five games, with Patterson throwing eight interceptions to his eight touchdowns during that span. The sole win came against Vanderbilt, where Patterson threw for 351 yards and 4 touchdowns in the 57–35 victory.

Patterson went down with a knee injury in Ole Miss's game against LSU on October 21. The next day it was revealed that Patterson had suffered a torn PCL and would miss the remainder of the season. At the time of his injury, he led the SEC in passing yards with 2,259 yards.

After the conclusion of the 2017 season, it was announced that Ole Miss would be banned from the postseason again in 2018 due to the NCAA violations. Shortly thereafter, Patterson sought and was granted permission to explore a transfer to another school.

=== Michigan ===
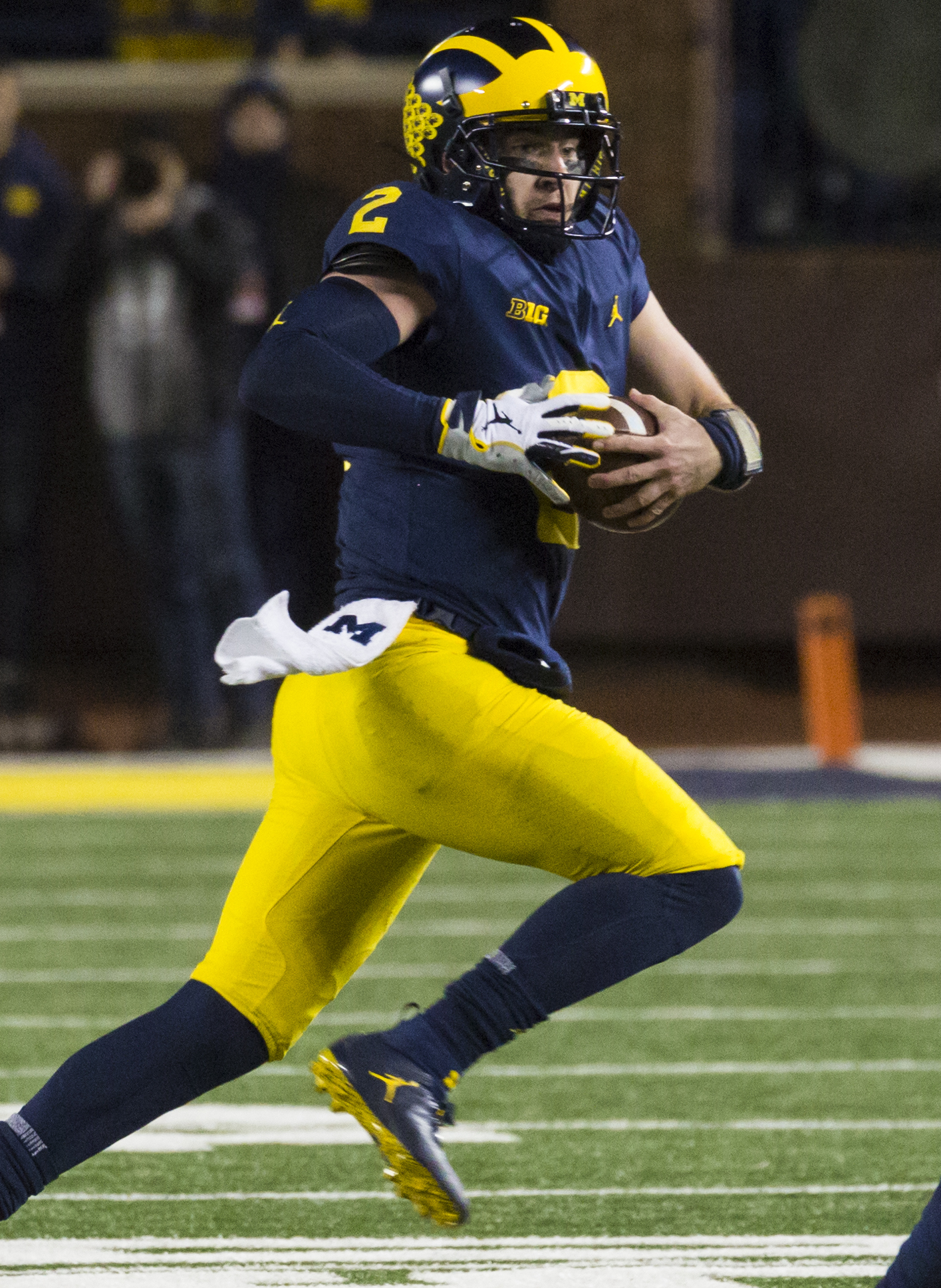
Patterson playing for the Wolverines in 2018

==== 2018 ====
On December 11, 2017, Patterson announced he would be transferring to the University of Michigan to play for the Michigan Wolverines. Normally, NCAA football student-athletes who transfer schools with more than a year of eligibility remaining must sit out a year before being eligible to play. Patterson sought a waiver in order to be eligible for play immediately at Michigan, claiming that he had been misled by Ole Miss coaches during his recruitment regarding the ongoing NCAA investigation. Ole Miss formally objected to Patterson's waiver appeal, saying they did not agree with Patterson's stated reasons for transferring. On April 27, 2018, it was announced that Patterson would be immediately eligible to play for Michigan. A new amendment to transfer waiver guidelines approved by the NCAA led to the withdrawal of Patterson's first waiver application and the submission of a new application supported by both Michigan and Ole Miss, which was approved by the NCAA.

Patterson was named the starting quarterback going into Michigan's 2018 season opener against Notre Dame. He struggled to get the Wolverine offense moving in that game, as Michigan scored only one offensive touchdown in a 24–17 loss to the Fighting Irish. Patterson threw for 227 yards and one interception in the game. Following the loss, Patterson's fortunes improved along with the rest of the Michigan team, as the Wolverines won the following ten games and rose to fourth in the College Football Playoff rankings. In a 45–20 victory over SMU on September 15, Patterson posted a career high in passer efficiency rating (232.3) to go along with 237 passing yards, two touchdowns and an interception. On November 3, Patterson threw two touchdown passes and ran for another on the ground in a blowout 42–7 victory over then-No. 14 Penn State. He was named Big Ten Player of the Week by the Rose Bowl Game Football Committee following the win. In a regular season-ending loss to rival Ohio State that knocked Michigan out of contention for a Big Ten title, Patterson threw for 187 yards, three touchdowns, and one interception. In the Peach Bowl against Florida, Patterson posted a season-low in passer efficiency rating (114.2) as he threw for 236 yards, one touchdown, and two interceptions in a 15–41 loss for the Wolverines.

During the 2018 season, Patterson recorded 2,600 yards passing and 273 yards on the ground. He totaled 24 touchdowns with 22 passing scores and two rushing touchdowns and had a 64.4 percent completion rate. He generated a pass efficiency rating of 149.4, second in the Big Ten in 2018. Following the regular season, he was named to the All-Big Ten offensive third-team by the coaches.

On December 21, 2018, Patterson announced that he would be returning to Michigan for his senior year.

==== 2019 ====
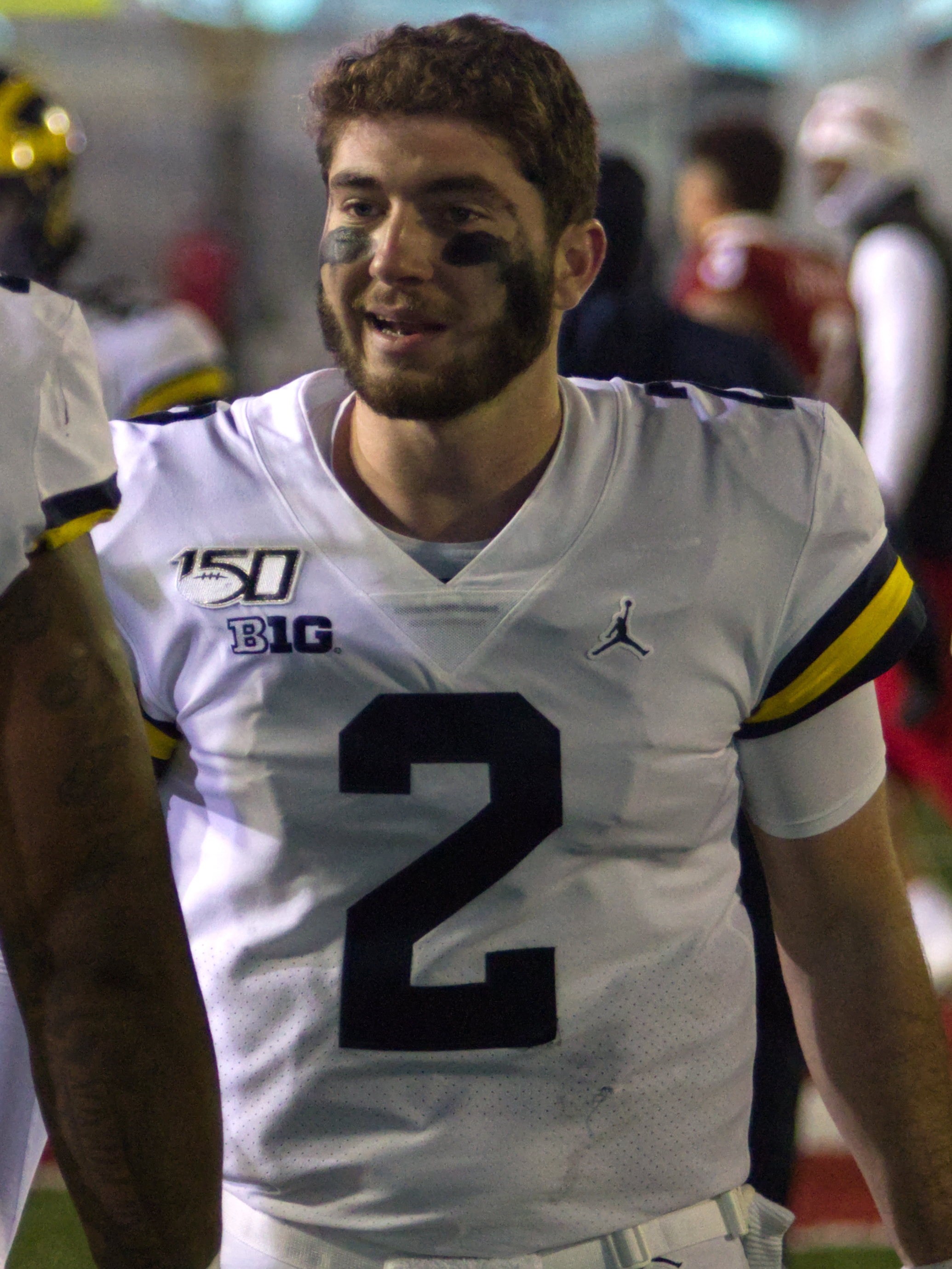
Patterson with the Michigan Wolverines in 2019

Under the leadership of new offensive coordinator Josh Gattis, Patterson and the Wolverine offense struggled in the first part of the 2019 season. In the second game of the season, Michigan escaped with a win in overtime against Army, with Patterson throwing for 207 yards in the game. After a bye week, the Wolverines were soundly defeated by Wisconsin on the road, 35–14; at points, Patterson traded snaps with backup Dylan McCaffrey. On September 28, 2019, in a 52–0 victory over Rutgers, Patterson rushed for three touchdowns, becoming the sixth quarterback in program history to rush for three touchdowns in a game, and the first to do so since Devin Gardner in 2013. In a 44–10 victory against rival Michigan State on November 16, Patterson threw for 384 yards and four touchdowns, both of which were highs for him since transferring to Michigan. He was named Big Ten Co-Offensive Player of the Week (with Jonathan Taylor) following the performance. On November 23, in a 39–14 victory over Indiana, Patterson threw for 366 yards and five touchdowns, becoming the first Michigan quarterback with consecutive 300-yard games since Jake Rudock in 2015. He also became the first quarterback in program history to record four touchdown passes in consecutive games. Patterson's five touchdown passes were the second most by any quarterback in program history and the most during a regulation game. On November 30, in a 56–27 loss to Ohio State, Patterson threw for 305 yards and one touchdown, becoming the first quarterback in program history to throw for 300 or more yards in three consecutive games. In Patterson's last game for the Wolverines in the 2020 Citrus Bowl against Alabama, Patterson led the team to a 16–14 lead at half-time, but the offense sputtered in the second half as they went on to lose 35–16. Patterson completed 17 of 37 passes for 233 yards and a touchdown in the game.

Following the regular season, Patterson was named to the All-Big Ten offensive third-team by both the coaches and media. Patterson ended his senior year with 3,061 passing yards and 23 touchdowns, becoming the third quarterback in program history to pass for over 3,000 yards in a season after John Navarre (3,331 yards in 2003) and Jake Rudock (3,017 yards in 2015). Patterson ended his career at seventh on the all-time Michigan passing yards leaderboard with 5,661 career yards. He passed Tom Brady in his last game against Ohio State and passed his head coach Jim Harbaugh in the Citrus Bowl.

== Professional baseball career ==
Patterson played baseball in high school, and during the offseason before his first year at Michigan, Patterson was selected in the 39th round of the 2018 MLB draft by the Texas Rangers. Patterson signed a contract with the Texas Rangers that allowed him to play out his final two years of eligibility at Michigan, while not appearing in any minor-league games during that time. Patterson spent a few games with the Round Rock Express between the end of summer football and the start of fall camp in July 2018; taking hitting and fielding practice, and being in the dugout during the games. Patterson reported to 2019 minor league spring training, before attending spring football practice at Michigan. Patterson's 2018 contract was for 6 years and requires him to spend one week per year with the Rangers to remain in good standing.

== Professional football career ==
Pre-draft measurables
Height	Weight	Arm length	Hand span	Wingspan	40-yard dash	10-yard split	20-yard split	20-yard shuttle	Three-cone drill	Vertical jump	Broad jump
6 ft 0 7/8 in (1.85 m)	212 lb (96 kg)	30 1/2 in (0.77 m)	9 3/8 in (0.24 m)	6 ft 1 1/2 in (1.87 m)	4.71 s	1.58 s	2.73 s	4.50 s	7.14 s	31.0 in (0.79 m)	9 ft 8 in (2.95 m)
All values from NFL Combine

=== Kansas City Chiefs ===
Patterson went undrafted in the 2020 NFL draft. On May 3, 2020, he signed with the Kansas City Chiefs where he joined former Michigan quarterback Chad Henne and former Ole Miss teammate Jordan Ta'amu as backups to Patrick Mahomes. Patterson was waived by Kansas City on July 10.

=== BC Lions ===
Patterson was selected by the Blues of The Spring League during its player selection draft on October 12, 2020. He signed with the BC Lions of the Canadian Football League (CFL) on June 16, 2021. He was assigned to the practice roster after training camp as the fourth-string quarterback. Patterson was released on September 10, without having played in a game.

=== Montreal Alouettes (first stint) ===
On September 21, 2021, Patterson signed with the CFL's Montreal Alouettes. Due to injuries to Vernon Adams and Matthew Shiltz, he dressed in 5 games as a short yardage quarterback and rushed for 18 yards on 11 carries. He was released during the off-season.

=== Michigan Panthers ===
On February 22, 2022, Patterson was drafted first overall by the Michigan Panthers in the 2022 USFL draft. He was released on May 25.

=== New Orleans Breakers ===
Patterson was claimed off waivers by the New Orleans Breakers on May 25, 2022.

=== Saskatchewan Roughriders ===
On February 13, 2023, Patterson signed with the Saskatchewan Roughriders of the CFL.

=== Winnipeg Blue Bombers ===
On February 12, 2025, the Winnipeg Blue Bombers announced that Patterson had signed a one-year contract with the team. He was released during training camp on May 14.

=== Montreal Alouettes (second stint) ===
On August 19, 2025, Patterson signed with the Montreal Alouettes. He became a free agent upon the expiry of his contract on February 10, 2026.

== Career football statistics ==
=== Professional ===
Pro football regular season statistics
Year	Team	League	Games			Passing								Rushing			
Year	Team	League	GP	GS	Record	Cmp	Att	Pct	Yds	Y/A	TD	Int	Rtg	Att	Yds	Avg	TD
2021	MTL	CFL	5	0	0–0	0	0	0.0	0	0.0	0	0	0.0	11	18	1.6	0
2022	MICH	USFL	6	5	1–5	95	160	59.4	947	5.9	4	5	71.5	33	170	5.2	2
2022	NO	USFL	1	0	0–1	9	15	60.0	36	2.4	0	0	64.6	4	5	1.2	0
2023	SSK	CFL	13	0	0–0	4	6	66.7	32	5.3	0	0	79.9	15	39	2.6	2
2024	SSK	CFL	18	7	2–4–1	131	217	60.4	1,655	7.6	6	5	83.8	38	134	3.5	7
2025	MTL	CFL	8	0	0–0	0	1	0.0	0	0.0	0	0	39.6	20	45	2.3	6

=== College ===
College football statistics
Year	Team	GP	Passing							Rushing			
Year	Team	GP	Cmp	Att	Pct	Yds	TD	Int	Rtg	Att	Yds	Avg	TD
2016	Ole Miss	3	72	132	54.5	880	6	3	121.0	41	169	4.1	0
2017	Ole Miss	7	166	260	63.8	2,259	17	9	151.5	47	−16	−0.3	1
2018	Michigan	13	210	325	64.4	2,600	22	7	149.8	76	273	3.6	2
2019	Michigan	13	214	381	56.2	3,061	23	8	139.4	87	50	0.6	5
Career		36	662	1,098	60.3	8,800	68	27	143.1	251	476	1.9	8

== Personal life ==
Patterson's parents are Sean and Karen Patterson; his grandfather, George Patterson, played for the Detroit Pistons. His older brother, Sean, was an associate player personnel analyst with the Ole Miss football staff. He has two older sisters, Abby Ehrlich and Kacie Patterson, and one younger brother, Nick Patterson. In 2020, Nick Patterson committed to play football at Princeton after withdrawing a previous commitment to Michigan.
