= C. J. Marable =

American football player (born 1997)

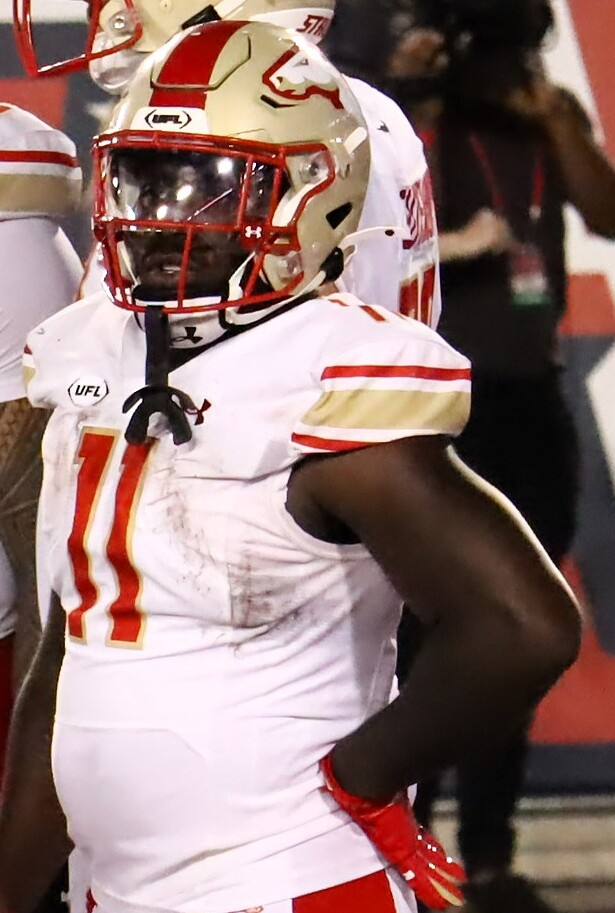
- Marable in 2025

No. 11
- Position: Running back

Personal information
- Born: February 22, 1997 (age 29); Decatur, Georgia, U.S.
- Listed height: 5 ft 10 in (1.78 m)
- Listed weight: 200 lb (91 kg)

Career information
- High school: Towers (Decatur, Georgia)
- College: Presbyterian (2017); Coastal Carolina (2018–2020)
- NFL draft: 2021: undrafted

Career history
- Chicago Bears (2021)*; Birmingham Stallions (2022–2023); New England Patriots (2023)*; Birmingham Stallions (2024–2025)
- * Offseason or practice squad member only

Awards and highlights
- 2× USFL champion (2022, 2023); UFL champion (2024); First-team All-Sun Belt (2020)
- Stats at Pro Football Reference

C. J. Marable (born February 22, 1997) is an American former professional football running back for the Birmingham Stallions of the United Football League (UFL). He played college football at Presbyterian and Coastal Carolina. He has been a member of the Chicago Bears and New England Patriots.

== College career ==
In 2015, Marable signed with the Arkansas State football team. Due to a low ACT score, Marable was told by the coaching staff he needed to enroll in the spring semester of 2016. After failed dialogue between the coaching staff and Marable, he was offered a scholarship by Presbyterian. In Marable's first game at Presbyterian, he ran for 162 yards on 16 carries against Wake Forrest. In November, Marable ran for 126 yards against FBS foe Liberty. Marable spent the next three seasons at Coastal Carolina. Marable was named First-team All-Sun Belt his senior season. Marable participated in the 2021 Hula Bowl, where he was named team Kai's offensive MVP for the contest after he recorded 17 rushing yards and a go ahead touchdown.

=== Statistics ===
Year	Team	Games		Rushing				Receiving			
Year	Team	GP	GS	Att	Yds	Avg	TD	Rec	Yds	Avg	TD
2016	Arkansas State	0	0	Blueshirted (redshirt)							
2017	Presbyterian	11	11	181	1,038	5.7	11	9	130	14.4	2
2018	Coastal Carolina	12	9	118	719	6.1	6	15	180	12.0	2
2019	Coastal Carolina	12	12	204	1,085	5.3	11	38	295	7.8	3
2020	Coastal Carolina	12	12	169	887	5.2	12	31	228	7.4	7
Career		47	44	672	3,729	5.5	40	93	833	9.0	14

== Professional career ==
=== Chicago Bears ===
Marable was signed by the Chicago Bears as an undrafted free agent on May 14, 2021. He was waived on August 24, 2021, at the end of training camp.

=== Birmingham Stallions (first stint) ===
Marable was selected in the 28th round of the 2022 USFL draft by the Birmingham Stallions. He was transferred to the team's inactive roster on May 20, 2022, with a knee injury.

Marable re-signed with the Stallions on July 12, 2023, but was released from his contract on August 11 to sign with an NFL team.

=== New England Patriots ===
Marable signed with the New England Patriots on August 12, 2023. He was waived on August 27, 2023.

=== Birmingham Stallions (second stint) ===
Marable re-signed with the Stallions on September 6, 2023. He re-signed with the team again on August 14, 2024.

On December 27, 2025, it was reported that Marable retired. After retiring as a player, Marable is still involved in the game training players and as an assistant coach at Lipscomb Academy in Nashville, TN.

== Career statistics ==
Legend
	Led the league
	League champion
**Bold**	Career high

=== Regular season ===
Year	Team	League	Games		Rushing				Receiving			
Year	Team	League	GP	GS	Att	Yds	Avg	TD	Rec	Yds	Avg	TD
2022	BHAM	USFL	9	5	102	401	3.9	5	20	161	8.1	0
2023	BHAM	USFL	10	10	118	524	4.4	3	28	235	8.4	2
2024	BHAM	UFL	8	5	80	294	3.7	4	19	137	7.2	1
2025	BHAM	UFL	8	4	79	223	2.8	1	12	70	5.8	1
Career			35	24	379	1,442	3.8	13	79	603	7.6	4

=== Postseason ===
Year	Team	League	Games		Rushing				Receiving			
Year	Team	League	GP	GS	Att	Yds	Avg	TD	Rec	Yds	Avg	TD
2022	BHAM	USFL	2	1	16	43	2.7	0	0	0	0.0	0
2023	BHAM	USFL	2	2	19	120	6.3	1	5	29	5.8	0
2024	BHAM	UFL	2	0	18	122	6.8	0	1	5	5.0	0
Career			6	2	53	285	5.4	1	6	34	5.7	0
