= Osirus Mitchell =

American football player (born 1998)

No. 14
- Position: Wide receiver

Personal information
- Born: September 15, 1998 (age 28); Sarasota, Florida, U.S.
- Listed height: 6 ft 5 in (1.96 m)
- Listed weight: 206 lb (93 kg)

Career information
- High school: Booker (Sarasota, Florida)
- College: Mississippi State (2016–2020)
- NFL draft: 2021: undrafted

Career history
- Dallas Cowboys (2021)*; Birmingham Stallions (2022); Green Bay Packers (2022)*; Houston Roughnecks (2023)*; Memphis Showboats (2023)
- * Offseason or practice squad member only

Awards and highlights
- USFL champion (2022)
- Stats at Pro Football Reference

Osirus Mitchell (born September 15, 1998) is an American former football wide receiver. He played college football at Mississippi State. He signed with the Dallas Cowboys of the National Football League (NFL) as an undrafted free agent following the 2021 NFL draft. He had stints with the Green Bay Packers, Birmingham Stallions and Memphis Showboats of the United States Football League (USFL), and the Houston Roughnecks of the XFL. While with the Stallions he was a USFL champion.

== Early life ==
Mitchell grew up Sarasota, Florida, and attended Booker High School. As a senior, he averaged 21.7 yards per catch and had 25 touchdown receptions. Mitchell was rated a three-star recruit but was not recruited heavily initially, as he was not expected to qualify academically to play college football. However, he was able to graduate from high school in the summer after his senior year. He signed to play at Mississippi State in June going into his first year over offers from Texas a&m, Tennessee, South Florida, Minnesota, Central Florida, Wake Forest and Illinois.

== College career ==
Mitchell redshirted his true freshman season. He played in nine games and caught five passes for 51 yards in his redshirt freshman season. As a redshirt sophomore, Mitchell led the team with 26 receptions for 427 yards and four touchdowns. Mitchell led the Bulldogs with 430 receiving yards and six touchdown receptions in his redshirt junior season.

Mitchell caught seven passes 183 yards in two touchdowns in a 44–34 victory in the first game of his redshirt senior over the defending national champion, LSU. He finished the season with 47 receptions for 505 yards and four touchdowns.

== Professional career ==
Pre-draft measurables
Height	Weight	Arm length	Hand span	40-yard dash	10-yard split	20-yard split	20-yard shuttle	Three-cone drill	Vertical jump	Broad jump	Bench press
6 ft 5 in (1.96 m)	206 lb (93 kg)	34 3/8 in (0.87 m)	10 7/8 in (0.28 m)	4.58 s	1.63 s	2.68 s	4.34 s	7.12 s	35.5 in (0.90 m)	10 ft 8 in (3.25 m)	12 reps
All values from Pro Day

=== Dallas Cowboys ===
Mitchell signed with the Dallas Cowboys as an undrafted free agent on May 14, 2021. He was waived on August 31, 2021, and re-signed to the practice squad the next day. He was released on December 20.

=== Birmingham Stallions ===
Mitchell was selected in the 15th round of the 2022 USFL draft by the Birmingham Stallions. He was named a starter at wide receiver, making 23 receptions for 333 yards and 3 touchdowns. His 4 catches for 64 yards and a receiving touchdown against the New Orleans Breakers in the playoffs, helped propel the Stallions to a victory.

=== Green Bay Packers ===
On July 26, 2022, Mitchell signed with the Green Bay Packers. On August 10, 2022, the Green Bay Packers released Mitchell. He was placed on injured reserve the next day. On September 19, 2022, Mitchell was waived from injured reserve with an injury settlement.

=== Houston Roughnecks ===
On February 1, 2023, Mitchell signed with the Houston Roughnecks of the XFL. On February 11, 2023, Mitchell was released during final roster cuts.

=== Memphis Showboats ===
On March 30, 2023, Mitchell signed with the Memphis Showboats of the United States Football League (USFL). He appeared in 10 games with one start, making 12 receptions for 159 yards. He was not part of the roster after the 2024 UFL dispersal draft on January 15, 2024.
