= 2023 Philadelphia Stars season =

American football season

- Owner: National Spring Football League Enterprises Co, LLC, (Fox Sports)
- General manager: Michael Woods
- Head coach: Bart Andrus
- Home stadium: Ford Field; Tom Benson Hall of Fame Stadium (Week 2)

Results
- Record: 4–6
- League place: 3rd in North Division
- Playoffs: Did not qualify

The 2023 season was the Philadelphia Stars' second season in the United States Football League (USFL), their second season under head coach Bart Andrus and their first under general manager Michael Woods. With their fourth loss of the season against the Birmingham Stallions in Week 8, they failed to improve on their previous season where they went 6–4 in the regular season. They failed to again qualify for the playoffs and avenge their narrow loss to the Stallions 33–30 in the 2022 USFL Championship Game.

== Offseason ==
=== Stadium plans ===
Shortly before the completion of the 2022 season, the USFL announced plans to move into two or four hubs for teams to play in. In November, the USFL was reportedly exploring options of having a hub in Metro Detroit, with possible locations being the Eastern Michigan Eagles' Rynearson Stadium and the Detroit Lions' Ford Field.

It was announced that the Stars would be playing their games in the Detroit, Michigan hub at Ford Field. They will share this hub with their North Division rival, the Michigan Panthers.

=== Draft ===
The Stars clinched the 7th pick in the 2023 USFL draft and hold the 7th pick in every round.

2023 Philadelphia Stars Draft
Round	Selection	Player	Position	College	Notes
1	6	Alfred Edwards	Offensive tackle	Utah State	
2	13	Anderson Hardy	Offensive tackle	Appalachian State	
3	21	Issac Moore	Offensive tackle	Temple	
4	29	Truman Jones	Defensive end	Harvard	
5	37	Earl Bostick Jr.	Offensive tackle	Kansas	
6	46	Jose Ramirez	Defensive end	Eastern Michigan	
7	54	Demontrey Jacobs	Offensive tackle	South Florida	
8	62	Trey Botts	Defensive lineman	CSU	
9	70	Destin Mack	Cornerback	The Citadel	
10	78	Dre Terry	Linebacker	Alabama A&M	

== Final roster ==
2023 Philadelphia Stars final roster
Quarterbacks: 10 Case Cookus; 19 Vad Lee; 13 Kevin Thomson; Running backs: 25 Paul Terry; 27 Dexter Williams; 6 Jamyest Williams; Wide receivers: 84 Samuel Akem; 1 Corey Coleman; 7 Devin Gray; 80 Cyril Grayson; 14 Diondre Overton; 17 Keric Wheatfall; 9 Terry Wright; Tight ends: 85 Ryan Izzo; 88 Pro Wells	Offensive linemen: 65 Sean Brown C; 73 Jake Burton G; 70 Shamarious Gilmore G; 78 Drew Himmelman T; 72 Khalil Keith G; 64 Chris Perez C; 67 Colby Ragland T; 60 Airon Servais T; 77 Chris Toth T; Defensive linemen: 92 Tyler Clark DT; 98 Ali Fayad DE; 44 Darius Hodge DE; 95 Ralph Holley DT; 97 Chris Nelson DT; 51 LaBryan Ray DT; 58 Adam Rodriguez DE; 94 Jordon Scott DT; 99 Carson Taylor DE	Linebackers: 50 Joey Alfieri; 49 B. J. Bello; 40 Joel Dublanko; 45 Ryan Greenhagen; 55 Gabe Sewell; Defensive backs: 21 Cody Brown S; 29 Amani Dennis CB; 18 Joshua Moon S; 30 Carlins Platel CB; 3 Stanford Samuels III CB; 33 Devin Taylor S; 4 LaDarius Wiley S; 39 Denzel Williams CB; 20 Evan Worthington S; Special teams: 15 Luis Aguilar K/P; 11 Lirim Hajrullahu P/K; 69 Ryan Navarro LS	Reserve lists: 5 Matt Colburn RB (IR); 22 Te'von Coney LB (IR); -- K. J. Costello QB (DNR); 79 Antonio Garcia T Retired; -- Bug Howard TE (DNR); -- Jahair Jones T (DNR); 90 Cedrick Lattimore DT (IR); -- Jordan Moore LB (Susp.); 12 Chris Rowland WR (IR); 8 Channing Stribling CB (IR); 2 Jordan Suell WR (IR); 61 Tristen Taylor T (IR); 23 Mazzi Wilkins CB (IR); 50 active, 13 inactive

== Staff ==
2023 Philadelphia Stars staff
Front office: General manager – Michael Woods; Head coaches: Head coach – Bart Andrus; Offensive coaches: Running backs – Ryan Meyers; Wide receivers/passing game coordinator – Marcel Bellefeuille; Tight ends – Glenn Smith; Offensive line/run game coordinator – Jeff Jagodzinski	Defensive coaches: Defensive coordinator/linebackers – Brad Miller; Defensive line – Brandon Maguire; Assistant defensive line – Brandon Noble; Defensive Backs/Special teams coordinator – Martin Bayless

== Schedule ==
=== Regular season ===
Week	Date	Time (ET)	Opponent	Result	Record	TV	Venue	Recap
1	April 15	4:30 p.m.	at Memphis Showboats	**W** 27–23	1–0	Fox	Simmons Bank Liberty Stadium	Recap
2	April 23	7:00 p.m.	vs. **Michigan Panthers**	**L** 10–24	1–1	FS1	Tom Benson Hall of Fame Stadium	Recap
3	April 30	12:00 p.m.	vs. **Pittsburgh Maulers**	**L** 13–21	1–2	NBC	Ford Field	Recap
4	May 6	1:00 p.m.	vs. Houston Gamblers	**L** 16–41	1–3	Fox	Ford Field	Recap
5	May 14	12:00 p.m.	vs. **New Jersey Generals**	**W** 24–21	2–3	NBC	Ford Field	Recap
6	May 21	12:00 p.m.	vs. New Orleans Breakers	**W** 16–10	3–3	FS1	Ford Field	Recap
7	May 27	9:00 p.m.	at **Pittsburgh Maulers**	**W** 37–31	4–3	FS1	Tom Benson Hall of Fame Stadium	Recap
8	June 3	3:00 p.m.	at Birmingham Stallions	**L** 24–27	4–4	NBC	Protective Stadium	Recap
9	June 11	7:00 p.m.	at **New Jersey Generals**	**L** 33–37	4–5	Fox	Tom Benson Hall of Fame Stadium	Recap
10	June 18	7:00 p.m.	at **Michigan Panthers**	**L** 20–23	4–6	Fox	Ford Field	Recap

Bold indicates divisional opponent.

=== Standings ===
North Division
#		W	L	PCT	GB	DIV	PF	PA	STK
1	**(y)** Pittsburgh Maulers	4	6	.400	–	4–2	177	178	W2
2	**(x)** Michigan Panthers	4	6	.400	–	3–3	171	215	W1
3	**(e)** Philadelphia Stars	4	6	.400	–	2–4	220	258	L3
4	**(e)** New Jersey Generals	3	7	.300	1	3–3	187	212	L1
**(x)**–clinched playoff berth; **(y)**–clinched division; **(e)**–eliminated from playoff contention

=== Game summaries ===
==== Week 1: at Memphis Showboats ====
Week 1: Philadelphia Stars at Memphis Showboats – Game summary

Quarter	1	2	3	4	Total
**Stars**	7	13	7	0	**27**
Showboats	7	3	7	6	**23**

at Simmons Bank Liberty Stadium

- Date: April 15
- Game time: 4:30 p.m. EST
- Referee: Bryan Banks
- TV announcers (FOX): Kevin Kugler (play-by-play), Mark Sanchez (analyst), and Devin Gardner (sideline reporter)

Game information

**First quarter**

- PHI – Corey Coleman 6-yard pass from Case Cookus (Luis Aguilar kick good), 6:21. Stars 7–0 **Drive: 9 plays, 71 yards, 4:29.**
- MEM – Rashard Davis 43-yard pass from Brady White (Alex Kessman kick good), 1:01. Tied 7–7 **Drive: 8 plays, 62 yards, 5:20.**

**Second quarter**

- PHI – Matt Colburn 5-yard pass from Case Cookus (Luis Aguilar kick good), 10:23. Stars 14–7 **Drive: 10 plays, 56 yards, 5:38.**
- PHI – Dexter Williams 12-yard rush (Luis Aguilar kick blocked), 1:55. Stars 20–7 **Drive: 8 plays, 62 yards, 4:13.**
- MEM – Alex Kessman 28-yard field goal, 0:41. Stars 20–10 **Drive: 6 plays, 49 yards, 1:18.**

**Third quarter**

- MEM – Ryan McDaniel 29-yard pass from Brady White (Alex Kessman kick good), 6:26. Stars 20–17 **Drive: 7 plays, 81 yards, 3:39.**
- PHI – Devin Gray 14-yard pass from Case Cookus (Luis Aguilar kick good), 0:13. Stars 27–17 **Drive: 10 plays, 64 yards, 6:13.**

**Fourth quarter**

- MEM – Alex Collins 1-yard rush (Alex Kessman kick no good), 7:24. Stars 27–23 **Drive: 12 plays, 54 yards, 7:49.**

**Top passers**

- PHI – Case Cookus – 20/29, 212 yards, 3 TD
- MEM – Brady White – 16/29, 182 yards, 2 TD, INT

**Top rushers**

- PHI – Case Cookus – 7 rushes, 31 yards
- MEM – Alex Collins – 14 rushes, 63 yards, TD

**Top receivers**

- PHI – Devin Gray – 7 receptions, 77 yards, TD
- MEM – Rashard Davis – 2 receptions, 75 yards, TD
