= Pro Wells =

American football player (born 1998)

No. 84
- Position: Tight end

Personal information
- Born: July 20, 1998 (age 28); St. Petersburg, Florida, U.S.
- Listed height: 6 ft 4 in (1.93 m)
- Listed weight: 257 lb (117 kg)

Career information
- High school: Dixie Hollins (St. Petersburg)
- College: Northwest Mississippi (2017); TCU (2018–2020)
- NFL draft: 2021: undrafted

Career history
- Cincinnati Bengals (2021)*; Philadelphia Stars (2022–2023)
- * Offseason or practice squad member only
- Stats at Pro Football Reference

Provonsha Wells (born July 20, 1998) is an American former professional football tight end. He played college football at Milford Academy (2016), Northwest Mississippi Community College (2017), and TCU (2018–2020).

== Early life ==
Pro Wells was born in St. Petersburg, Florida. He went to Dixie Hollins High School, where he caught 31 passes for 952 yards and five touchdowns. He also played high school basketball, earning all-county honors. In 2016, he attended Milford Academy in New Berlin, New York, where he caught nine passes for 205 yards and one touchdown. He transferred to Northwest Mississippi Community College in 2017, catching 19 passes for 304 yards and two touchdowns. In 2018, he played college football at TCU, appearing in four games a redshirt. He played in all 12 games in his second season at TCU, leading the team with five touchdowns receptions on 17 catches. Following the season Wells earned second-team all–Big 12 honors. In his junior season, he played in 10 games, placing fifth on TCU with 13 receptions for 195 yards and a team-leading three touchdowns. After the season Wells chose to forgo remaining eligibility and instead declare for the NFL draft.

== Professional career ==
=== Cincinnati Bengals ===
After going unselected in the 2021 NFL draft, Wells signed as an undrafted free agent with the Cincinnati Bengals. He was waived by the Bengals on August 16, 2021.

=== Philadelphia Stars ===
Wells was signed by the Philadelphia Stars of the United States Football League (USFL) on April 1, 2022. He became a free agent after the 2023 season.

=== Statistics ===
USFL statistics
Year	Team	Games		Receiving					Fumbles	
Year	Team	GP	GS	Rec	Yds	Avg	Lng	TD	Fum	Lost
2022	PHI	10	0	3	55	18.3	51	1	0	0
2023	PHI	1	0	1	10	10.0	10	0	0	0
Career		11	0	4	65	16.3	51	1	0	0

==== Postseason ====
USFL statistics
Year	Team	Games		Receiving					Fumbles	
Year	Team	GP	GS	Rec	Yds	Avg	Lng	TD	Fum	Lost
2022	PHI	2	0	0	0	0	0	0	0	
Career		2	0	0	0	0	0	0	0	

== Personal life ==
Wells' cousin, Jer'Zhan Newton, was the 2023 Big Ten Defensive Player of the Year and was selected by the NFL's Washington Commanders in the second round of the 2024 NFL draft. Another of his cousins, Jerjuan Newton, was signed as an undrafted free agent by the Denver Broncos in 2025.
