= Brandon Aubrey =

American football and soccer player (born 1995)

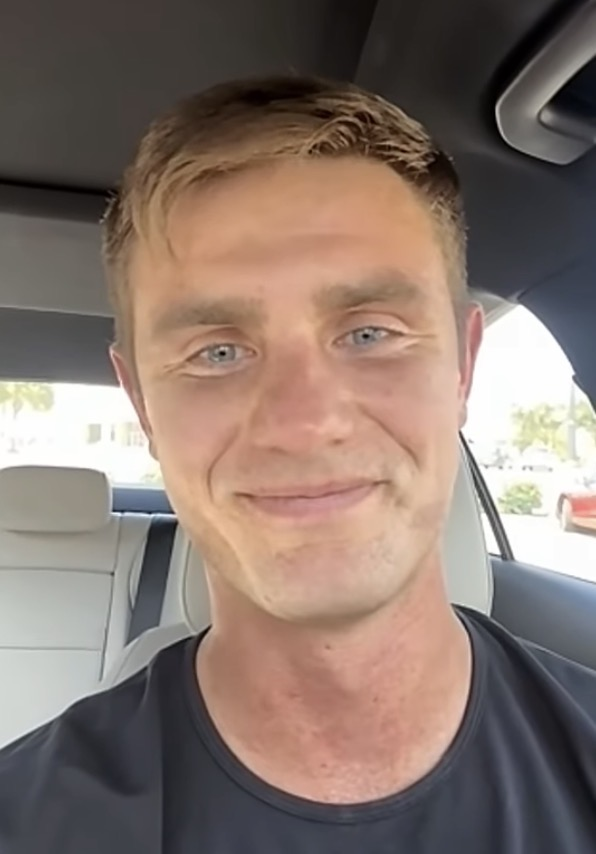
- Aubrey in 2025

Personal information
- Born: Brandon Scott Aubrey; March 14, 1995 (age 31)
- Football career

No. 17 – Dallas Cowboys
- Position: Placekicker
- Roster status: Active

Personal information
- Born: St. Louis, Missouri, U.S.
- Listed height: 6 ft 3 in (1.91 m)
- Listed weight: 218 lb (99 kg)

Career information
- High school: Plano (Plano, Texas)
- NFL draft: 2022: undrafted

Career history
- Birmingham Stallions (2022–2023); Dallas Cowboys (2023–present)

Awards and highlights
- First-team All-Pro (2023); 2× Second-team All-Pro (2024, 2025); 3× Pro Bowl (2023–2025); NFL scoring leader (2023); 2× USFL champion (2022, 2023); All-USFL Team (2022); USFL scoring leader (2022)

Career NFL statistics as of Week 10, 2026
- Field goals made: 131
- Field goals attempted: 151
- Field goal %: 86.8%
- Extra points made: 151
- Extra points attempted: 157
- Extra point %: 96.2%
- Points: 544
- Longest field goal: 65
- Touchbacks: 168
- Stats at Pro Football Reference

Sport
Association football career
- Position: Center back
Youth career
- 2005–2013: Dallas Texans SC
College career
Years	Team	Apps	(Gls)
2013–2016	Notre Dame Fighting Irish	76	(15)
Senior career*
Years	Team	Apps	(Gls)
2017	Toronto FC	0	(0)
2017	→ Toronto FC II (loan)	21	(0)
2018	Bethlehem Steel FC	26	(0)
- * Club domestic league appearances and goals as of October 15, 2018

Brandon Scott Aubrey (born March 14, 1995) is an American multi-sport athlete who plays as a placekicker for the Dallas Cowboys of the National Football League (NFL). He has also played professional association football as a center back.

In 2017, Aubrey was drafted by Toronto FC of Major League Soccer and played for the club's reserve team before moving to Bethlehem Steel FC. He then switched to American football and played for the Birmingham Stallions of the United States Football League (USFL) in 2022 and 2023 before being signed by the Cowboys in 2023.

Since entering the NFL, Aubrey has emerged as one of the league's top placekickers. With a 88.2% career field goal percentage, Aubrey ranks as the fifth-most accurate field goal kicker in NFL history, (Note: Minimum 100 attempts. The only players with a higher career field goal percentage are Cameron Dicker (93.4%), Eddy Piñeiro (89.7%), Justin Tucker (89.1%), and Harrison Butker (88.4%).) and he has been named an All-Pro in all three of his seasons thus far. Aubrey also holds the NFL record for the most career field goals made from 60 yards or longer, with seven.

== Soccer career ==
=== Youth career ===
Aubrey played youth soccer with Dallas Texans SC. He captained the '95 team from 2008 to 2010 and during his time with the team, they won five State Cup titles, were regional finalist in 2009, were Classic League grand champions in 2009 and 2010, were 2009 Premiere League West champions, and also won the 2008 Gothia Cup (Sweden), the 2009 Dallas Cup, the 2009 Disney Showcase, and the 2009 Tivoli Cup (Denmark). He was named to USSDA All-Select Team in 2011–12 and helped them win the U17 Disney Showcase twice.

Aubrey played his high school freshman and sophomore seasons at Dallas Jesuit in Dallas, Texas in 2010 and 2011, where he was named Honorable Mention All-District as a freshman and First Team All-District as a sophomore.

=== College career ===
Aubrey played four years of college soccer at the University of Notre Dame between 2013 and 2016, wherein 2016 Aubrey was named NSCAA Third Team All-American, NSCAA First Team All-South Region, First Team All-ACC, and NSCAA Academic All-American. The 2013 team won a National Championship.

=== Professional career ===
==== Toronto FC ====
Aubrey was selected in the first round (21st overall) of the 2017 MLS SuperDraft by Toronto FC. He was loaned to the second team, Toronto FC II, in the USL for the 2017 season. Aubrey made his professional debut on March 25, 2017, starting for Toronto FC II against the Phoenix Rising FC.

==== Bethlehem Steel FC ====
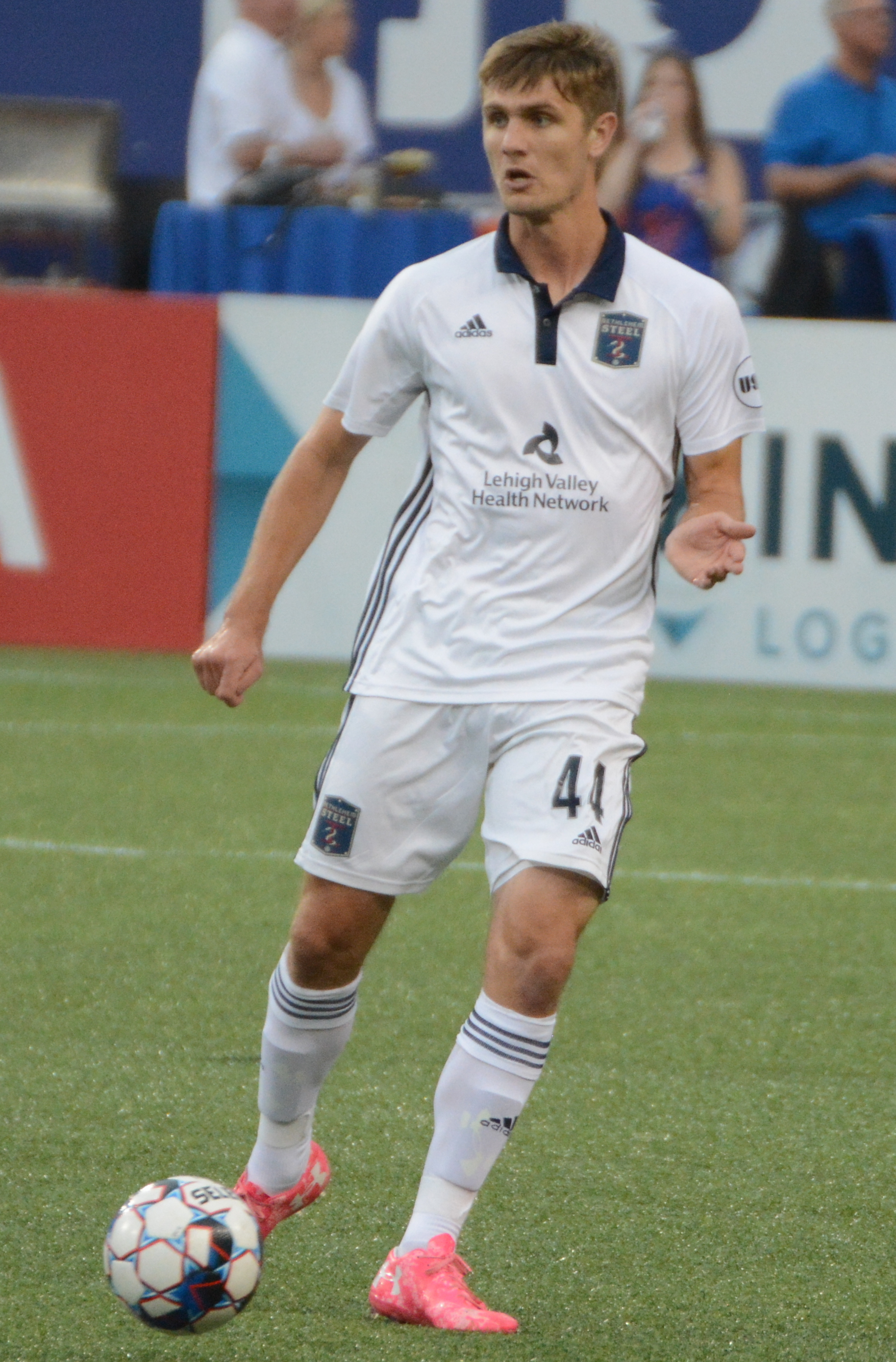
Aubrey in 2018

In January 2018, Aubrey signed with USL club Bethlehem Steel FC. He was released by the club at the end of the 2018 season.

== Transition to American football ==
After his professional soccer career ended, Aubrey began working as a software engineer at GM Financial in Arlington, Texas. While watching an NFL game, his wife, Jenn, told him: "You could do that." Aubrey began looking for kicking instructors in the Dallas-Fort Worth metroplex and found former Mississippi State kicker Brian Egan. Before working with Egan, Aubrey tried his kicking ability at Colleyville Heritage High School, where he made a field goal from almost midfield. Jenn recorded his kick. Egan later watched Aubrey kick and observed that he had a powerful leg but still needed to learn the mechanics of placekicking.

Aubrey trained with Egan for nearly two years while working full time for GM Financial. Three days a week, Aubrey went to the gym before work and arrived at his office in Arlington at 7 a.m. After he left work at around 3:30 p.m., Aubrey commuted to Frisco to train with Egan before it became dark outside. Aubrey developed a pre-kick routine involving three steps back and two steps over before each kick. Aubrey continued practicing at Colleyville Heritage High School on the weekends. During the COVID-19 pandemic, Aubrey continued to train after access to his normal facilities became limited. Aubrey taped lines in his garage and practiced his pre-kick routine 100 times a day. When the uprights were removed from B.F. Phillips Community Park, Aubrey aimed at a lamppost instead. Egan worked with Aubrey to transition his mechanics from soccer to American football. His frequent training helped Aubrey develop the muscle memory necessary for placekicking.

Egan eventually encouraged Aubrey to attend kicking combines to attract the attention of NFL teams. Aubrey accepted Egan's advice and attended several kicking combines in hopes of attracting attention from professional football teams. Aubrey traveled regularly to California to train with Carney alongside other kickers competing for opportunities. Aubrey's first showcase was in San Diego hosted by former NFL kicker Nick Novak. Aubrey then met Jeff Guenzburger, who offered Aubrey somewhere to stay and transportation in California while he traveled there for kicking events. Guenzburger helped Aubrey connect with Carney, who let him join his training sessions. Aubrey continued practicing with other kickers competing for a professional opportunity. Despite Aubrey's attempts, NFL teams held off on signing him because he lacked game film which prevented them from knowing if his performance could translate in a game. After the tryout, Carney recommended Aubrey to Skip Holtz, the head coach of the Birmingham Stallions. Aubrey continued to work for GM Financial while he waited for the USFL draft. He had one computer monitor on work with the other one on the USFL draft.

=== Birmingham Stallions ===
==== 2022 season ====
Aubrey was drafted as a placekicker by the Birmingham Stallions in the 2022 USFL draft and made his debut as a professional American football player on April 16, 2022. Aubrey played in all 10 games making 18 of his 22 field goal attempts (81.8%) and 22 of his 24 extra-point attempts (91.7%), which both led the league. He also had a league-leading 55 kickoffs with a 66.5-yard average. On June 16, Aubrey was named to the inaugural All-USFL Team. After winning the Divisional Finals 31–17, the Stallions beat the Philadelphia Stars in the 2022 USFL championship game 33–30. In the game, Aubrey was successful on two of his three attempts with a 42-yard long and made three of his four extra-point tries.

==== 2023 season ====
Aubrey re-signed with the Stallions for the 2023 season. He finished the season 14-for-15 (93.3%) on field goals with a 49-yard long while also finishing 35-for-35 (100.0%) on extra points, which led the league. Aubrey also added a league-leading 57 kickoffs and six touchbacks. The Stallions finished the regular season with an 8–2 record, making them the champions of the South Division. After winning the Divisional Finals against New Orleans Breakers 47–22, the Stallions made it to their second-straight USFL championship game. During the game, Aubrey made all four of his extra-point attempts to help the Stallions win 28–12.

=== Dallas Cowboys ===
==== 2023 season ====
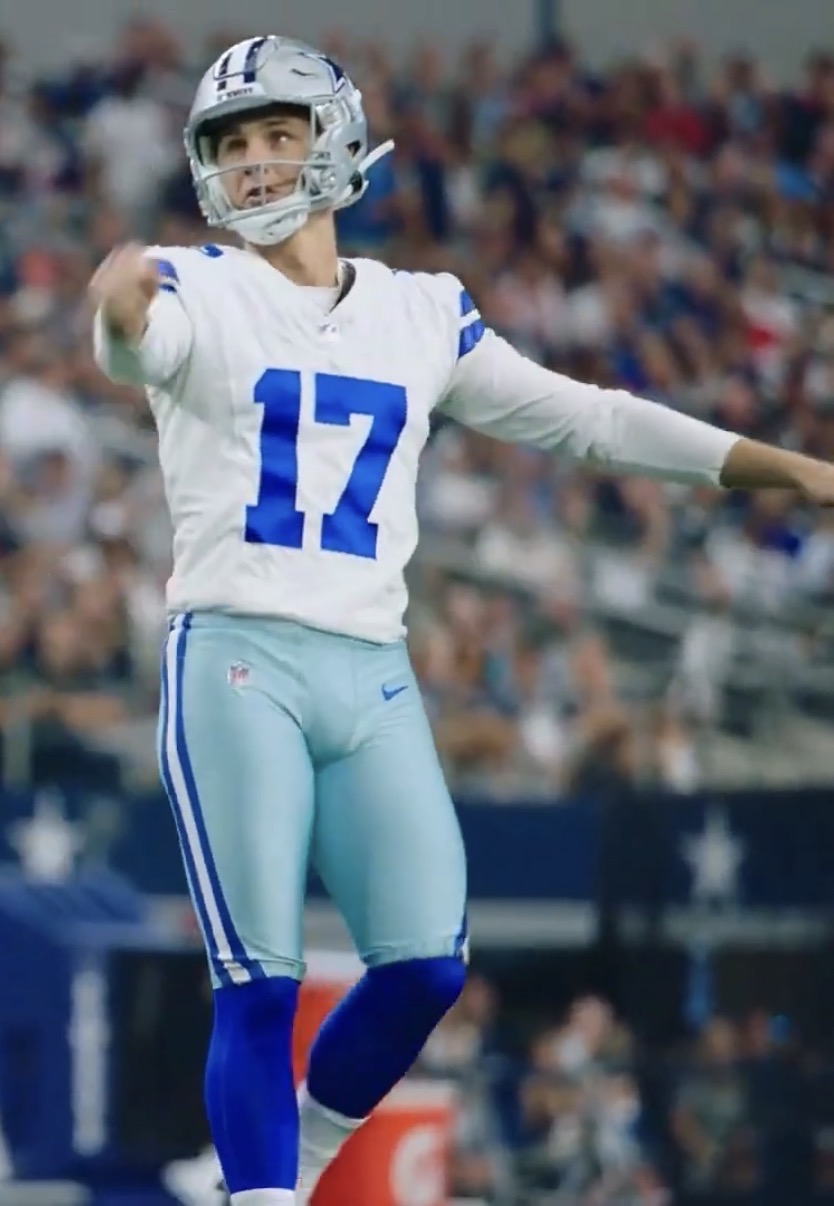
Aubrey in 2023

The Stallions terminated Aubrey's contract on July 3, 2023, allowing him to sign with the Dallas Cowboys of the National Football League three days later.

In his NFL debut, Aubrey connected on both of his field goal attempts with a long of 38, and made four of his five extra-point attempts in the 40–0 shutout road victory over the New York Giants. During a Week 8 43–20 victory over the Los Angeles Rams, Aubrey accounted for 11 points, including a 58-yard field goal. He was named NFC Special Teams Player of the Week for his performance as well as NFC Special Teams Player of the Month for October. In the next game against the Philadelphia Eagles, Aubrey set an NFL record for most consecutive field goals made to start a career with his 19th made attempt during the 28–23 road loss, beating the previous holder Travis Coons. During a Week 14 33–13 victory over the Eagles, Aubrey became the first kicker in NFL history to make two field goals from 59+ yards in the same game (59, 60). He would then be named Sunday Night Football Player of the Game, along with Dak Prescott and Stephon Gilmore. For his performance, Aubrey earned his second NFC Special Teams Player of the Week award.

In the 2023 season, Aubrey converted 49 of 52 extra point attempts and 36 of 38 field goal attempts.

==== 2024 season ====
On August 17, 2024, Aubrey kicked a 66-yard field goal in a preseason game against the Las Vegas Raiders, unofficially tying the NFL record. During the season-opening 33–17 victory over the Cleveland Browns, Aubrey nearly kicked another 66-yard field goal, which would have officially tied the NFL record, but the Cowboys were penalized for a delay of game penalty, negating the field goal. Two weeks later against the Baltimore Ravens, Aubrey kicked a 65-yard field goal, officially breaking Brett Maher's record for the longest made field goal in Cowboys franchise history, along with being the second-longest field goal in NFL history. The Cowboys went on to lose 28–25. During Week 16 against the Tampa Bay Buccaneers on Sunday Night Football, Aubrey went 4/4 on field goals and 3/3 on 50+ yard kicks in the narrow 26–24 victory. He was named NFC Special Teams Player of the Week for his performance.

In the 2024 season, Aubrey converted all 30 extra point attempts and 40 of 47 field goals.

==== 2025 season ====
During Week 2, Aubrey scored 16 points as the Cowboys defeated the New York Giants 40–37 in overtime. He made all four of his field goals and all four of his extra points. Aubrey's four field goals included a 64-yard field goal at the end of regulation and the 46-yard game winner in overtime. This made him the only NFL player with multiple successful 64+ yard field goals. Aubrey also became the first player in NFL history to convert a game-tying field goal with no time remaining in the fourth quarter and a game-winning field goal with no time remaining in overtime. He was named NFC Special Teams Player of the Week for his performance. During Week 7, Aubrey became the first NFL kicker in NFL history with five made field goals of 60-plus yards.

During Week 12 against the Eagles, Aubrey made a 42-yard field goal as time expired, helping the Cowboys cap off a 24–21 comeback victory. Two weeks later against the Detroit Lions, Aubrey had five field goals in the 44–30 road loss, including three that were from a distance of 55 yards or more, with the longest being from 63 yards. He broke an NFL record for most field goals in a game from a distance of 55 yards or further while also breaking the record for most field goals of 60 yards or more in an NFL season, with three. Not only that, but Aubrey set a new personal record for most career 60 yards or longer field goals, with his 63-yard field goal in this game being the sixth of his career.

==== 2026 season ====
Designated as a restricted free agent in the 2026 offseason, the Cowboys placed a second-round tender on Aubrey on March 7, 2026. On April 20, Aubrey and the Cowboys agreed to a record-breaking four-year deal, $28 million contract with $20 million guaranteed.

== Statistics ==
=== College soccer ===
School	Season	Division	Apps	Goals
Notre Dame Fighting Irish	2013	Div. I	14	0
Notre Dame Fighting Irish	2014	Div. I	21	3
Notre Dame Fighting Irish	2015	Div. I	20	3
Notre Dame Fighting Irish	2016	Div. I	21	9
Career total			76	15

=== Club soccer ===
As of October 28, 2018

Club	Season	League			Playoffs		National Cup		Total	
Club	Season	Division	Apps	Goals	Apps	Goals	Apps	Goals	Apps	Goals
Toronto FC	2017	MLS	0	0	0	0	0	0	0	0
Toronto FC II (loan)	2017	USL	21	0	—		—		21	0
Bethlehem Steel FC	2018	USL	26	0	2	0	—		28	0
Career total			47	0	0	0	0	0	49	0

=== USFL ===
Legend
	USFL champion
	USFL record
	Led the league
**Bold**	Career high

==== Regular season ====
General			Field goals					PATs			Kickoffs			Points
Season	Team	GP	FGM	FGA	FG%	Blk	Lng	XPM	XPA	XP%	KO	Avg	TBs	Pts
2022	BIR	**10**	**18**	**22**	81.8%	0	**49**	22	24	91.7%	55	66.5	**7**	76
2023	BIR	**10**	14	15	**93.3%**	0	**49**	**35**	**35**	**100.0%**	**57**	**70.1**	6	**77**
USFL career		20	32	37	86.5%	0	49	57	59	96.6%	112	68.3	13	153

==== Postseason ====
General			Field goals					PATs			Kickoffs			Points
Season	Team	GP	FGM	FGA	FG%	Blk	Lng	XPM	XPA	XP%	KO	Avg	TBs	Pts
2022	BIR	**2**	**3**	**5**	60.0%	0	**42**	7	8	87.5%	12	64.9	0	**16**
2023	BIR	**2**	2	2	**100.0%**	0	41	**9**	**10**	**90.0%**	**14**	**66.6**	**4**	15
USFL career		4	5	7	71.4%	0	42	16	18	88.9%	26	65.8	4	29

=== NFL ===
Legend
	NFL record
	Led the league
**Bold**	Career high

==== Regular season ====
General			Field goals					PATs			Kickoffs			Points
Season	Team	GP	FGM	FGA	FG%	Blck	Long	XPM	XPA	XP%	KO	Avg	TBs	Pts
2023	DAL	17	**36**	38	94.7	1	60	**49**	**52**	94.2	**109**	**64.8**	**99**	**157**
2024	DAL	17	40	**47**	85.1	**3**	**65**	30	30	**100.0**	88	60.7	43	150
2025	DAL	17	36	42	85.7	0	64	47	48	97.9	101	59.9	17	155
2026	DAL	10	19	24	79.2	2	60	25	27	92.6	62	55.7	9	82
NFL career		61	131	151	86.8	6	65	151	157	96.2	360	60.8	168	544

==== Postseason ====
General			Field goals					PATs			Kickoffs			Points
Season	Team	GP	FGM	FGA	FG%	Blck	Long	XPM	XPA	XP%	KO	Avg	TBs	Pts
2023	DAL	1	1	1	100.0	0	34	1	2	50.0	5	44.0	3	4
NFL career		1	1	1	100.0	0	34	1	2	50.0	5	44.0	3	4

=== NFL records ===
- Most consecutive field goals made to start a career: 36 (2023)
- Most field goals made of 50+ yards without a miss in a single season: 10 (2023)
- Most kickoffs for touchbacks in a single season: 99 (2023)
- Highest field goal percentage by a rookie in a single season: 94.7% (2023)
- First player to make their first 10 field goal attempts in their first three games (Super Bowl era)
- First player to make two 59+ yard field goals in a single game (December 10, 2023, vs. Philadelphia Eagles)
- Most field goals made of at least 50 yards in a season: 14 (2024)
- Longest field goal in the first quarter of a game: 65 yards (September 22, 2024, vs. Baltimore Ravens)
- First player to make 10 or more 50+ yard kicks in consecutive seasons (Achieved November 18, 2024 vs. Houston Texans)
- First player to make three 55+ yard field goals in a single game: 3 (December 4, 2025, vs. Detroit Lions)
- Most field goals of 60 yards or more in a single season: 3 (2025)
- Most 60+ yard field goals, career: 7

==== Cowboys franchise records ====
- Longest successful field goal attempt: 65 yards (September 22, 2024, vs. Baltimore Ravens)

== Career honors ==
=== Soccer ===
==== NCAA ====
- NCAA Division I Men's National Champion (2013)
- CSN All-America Second Team (2016)
- NSCAA All-American Third Team (2016)
- NSCAA Scholar All-America First Team (2016)
- NSCAA All-South Region First Team (2016)

==== ACC ====
- All-ACC First Team (2016)
- ACC Championship All-Tournament Team (2015)

=== Football ===
==== USFL ====
- 2× USFL Champion (2022, 2023)
- All-USFL Team (2022)

==== NFL ====
- First-team All-Pro (2023)
- 2× Second-team All-Pro (2024, 2025)
- 3× Pro Bowl (2023-2025)
- NFL scoring leader (2023)
- 4× NFC Special Teams Player of the Month (2023: October, December) (2024: September) (2025: September)
- 4× NFC Special Teams Player of the Week (2023: Week 8, Week 14) (2024: Week 16) (2025: Week 2)
- Sunday Night Football Player of the Game 2023: Week 14

== Personal life ==
Aubrey met his wife Jenn in high school; the two married on January 4, 2019. Their son, Colton, was born in 2024.
