= 2022 USFL championship game =

2022 United States Football League championship game

- 2022 USFL championship game logo
Philadelphia Stars (6–4)	Birmingham Stallions (9–1)
30	33
Head coach: Bart Andrus	Head coach: Skip Holtz
	1	2	3	4	Total
PHI	3	6	6	15	30
BHAM	10	10	0	13	33
- Date: July 3, 2022
- Kickoff time: 7:30 p.m. EDT (UTC-4)
- Stadium: Tom Benson Hall of Fame Stadium; Canton, Ohio
- MVP: Victor Bolden Jr., Birmingham
- Favorite: Birmingham by 4.5
- Referee: Alex Moore
- Attendance: 20,000

TV in the United States
- Network: Fox
- Announcers: Curt Menefee (play-by-play), Joel Klatt (analyst), and Brock Huard (sideline reporter)
- Nielsen ratings: 0.9 (1.52 million viewers)

The 2022 USFL championship game was an American football game which was played on July 3, 2022, at Tom Benson Hall of Fame Stadium in Canton, Ohio. The contest, which determined the champion of the United States Football League (USFL), featured the winners of the playoff semifinal games: the Philadelphia Stars from the North Division and the Birmingham Stallions from the South Division. It was the inaugural USFL championship game and the final game of the 2022 USFL season. The game began at 7:30 p.m. EDT and was broadcast on Fox. Prize money was awarded to players on the winning team in the amount of $10,000 in addition to their salary.

Both teams traded field goals in the first quarter before Bo Scarbrough scored the game's first touchdown, putting Birmingham ahead by seven points. Philadelphia's Case Cookus completed a pass to Jordan Suell for a touchdown in the second quarter, but the extra point was unsuccessful. The Stallions scored twice more before halftime, with a touchdown pass from J'Mar Smith to Marlon Williams with seven minutes remaining, followed by a Brandon Aubrey field goal as time expired, and Birmingham led 20–9 at the break. The Stars scored the only points of the third quarter, with Cookus passing to Suell for a touchdown, but the two-point conversion failed and the Stallions' lead remained at five points. Philadelphia took the lead with a touchdown early in the fourth quarter, putting them ahead by three. The Stallions responded with an 8-yard touchdown pass, immediately followed by an interception returned for a touchdown with just under three minutes remaining. Philadelphia was able to score once more but threw another interception on their final possession and Birmingham was able to run out the clock. The game finished with Birmingham winning the USFL championship, 33–30.

== Background ==
The United States Football League was originally founded in 1982 as a professional spring and summer league. It completed three full seasons, from 1983 to 1985, before folding prior to its 1986 season, which was to be played in the fall, in direct competition with the National Football League (NFL). The direct competition, in addition to a failed antitrust lawsuit against the NFL, led to the league's decline. On June 3, 2021, the new United States Football League, a distinct league from its predecessor, announced that it would begin play with eight teams in spring 2022. The list of eight teams were unveiled on November 22, 2021, all of which shared their name and colors with a team that competed in the original USFL. As part of the USFL's salary structure, each member of the championship team received $10,000 in addition to their salary.

=== Host selection ===
While the entirety of the 2022 USFL regular season was played in Birmingham, Alabama, the three playoff games were scheduled for Canton, Ohio. The location was announced on February 16, 2022, with the 2022 World Games in Birmingham cited as the reason behind the move.

=== USFL playoffs ===
The two lowest-finishing teams from each division were excluded from participation in the playoffs. From the North Division, the Pittsburgh Maulers were mathematically eliminated from playoff contention on June 3, and the Michigan Panthers were eliminated two days later. In the South Division, the Houston Gamblers were the first team ruled out of the postseason, on May 29, while the Tampa Bay Bandits were eliminated from postseason contention on June 12.

The first semifinal game was held between the North Division first and second place teams, the New Jersey Generals and the Philadelphia Stars. Despite their status as 4.5-point underdogs, the Stars took the lead on a punt return with two minutes remaining and held it for the remainder of the game to win 19–14 and clinch a berth in the championship game. The third meeting between the Generals and Stars during the season, the game was the first win of the series for the Stars. The second semifinal game followed, which was contested by the Birmingham Stallions and the New Orleans Breakers. Each team scored twice within the first two quarters, but Birmingham scored a third touchdown to take a 21–14 lead into halftime; they would not relinquish the lead for the rest of the game, scoring twice more to win 31–17 and clinch the remaining championship game spot. With their playoff semifinal victories, the Stallions entered the USFL championship game with a record of 9–1, while the Stars entered with a record of 6–4.

==== Bracket ====
Division Finals; June 25, 2022
N1	New Jersey Generals	14
N2	Philadelphia Stars	19
S1	Birmingham Stallions	31
S2	New Orleans Breakers	17

USFL Championship; July 3, 2022
N2	Philadelphia Stars	30
S1	Birmingham Stallions	33

== Teams ==
=== Philadelphia Stars ===
The Stars, led by head coach Bart Andrus, began their season with a contest against the New Orleans Breakers, which they lost by six points. Philadelphia won their first game the following week, when they defeated divisional opponent Pittsburgh, 30–23. To begin the month of May, the Stars lost to the New Jersey Generals by eight points, but rebounded with a one-point win against the Michigan Panthers. The Stars fell to the Stallions by thirteen points as they re-entered non-divisional play, but began a four-game winning streak the following game with a seven-point victory against the Tampa Bay Bandits. The Stars reached above .500 for the first time in the season the following week with a win over the Houston Gamblers by nine points. Philadelphia finished the season with three final divisional games, beginning with a sound defeat of the Michigan Panthers, 46–24. The fourth of four consecutive wins for the Stars came on June 12 against the Maulers, after Philadelphia took the lead with under five minutes remaining in the game. The regular season concluded with a three-point defeat for the Stars against the New Jersey Generals, who extended their winning streak to nine games.

=== Birmingham Stallions ===
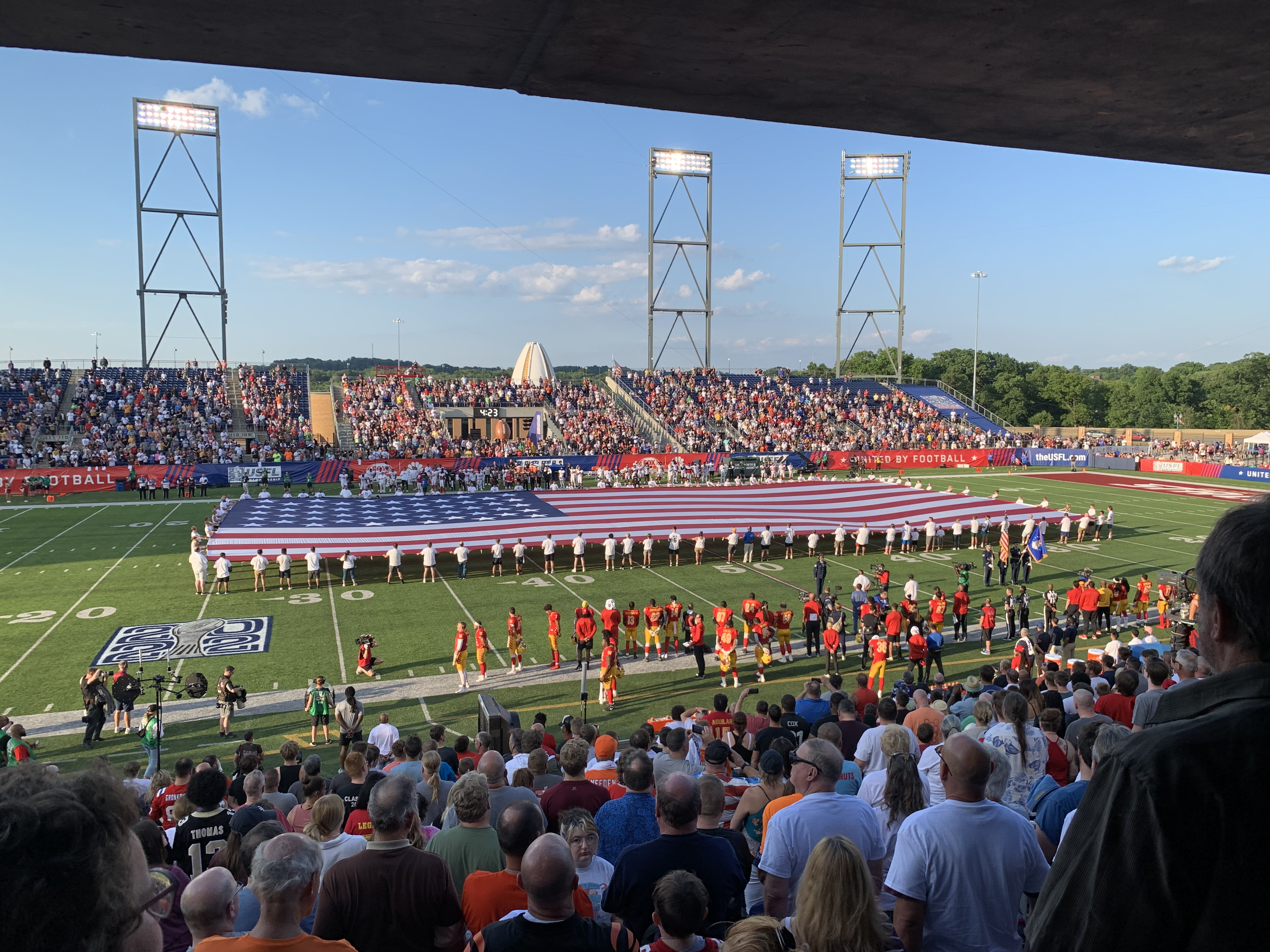
Pregame display of the American flag

The Stallions, led by head coach Skip Holtz, began their season with the league's inaugural game, a four-point victory against the New Jersey Generals, which was simulcast by both NBC and Fox. Their following three games were all against divisional opponents; they defeated the Houston Gamblers by five points, and then defeated the New Orleans Breakers by nine, which was the Breakers' first loss of the year. The Stallions improved to 4–0 with another victory, this against the Tampa Bay Bandits by six points. Birmingham returned to non-divisional play with their fifth game of the season, in which they trailed the Philadelphia Stars entering the third quarter but rallied back to take the lead and win the game. The Stallions stayed unbeaten with a victory over the Michigan Panthers, 33–17, and followed that up with a ten-point victory over the Pittsburgh Maulers, which clinched a playoff berth for Birmingham. The final three regular season games of the schedule were all rematches of divisional games from weeks two through four, starting with a one-point victory over the New Orleans Breakers that clinched the South Division championship. The Stallions suffered their first and only loss of the regular season on June 11, after giving up a safety that led to a two-point loss against the Houston Gamblers. Birmingham rebounded to win their final regular season game, against the Tampa Bay Bandits, by three points, improving their record to 9–1 entering the playoffs.

== Game summary ==
=== First half ===
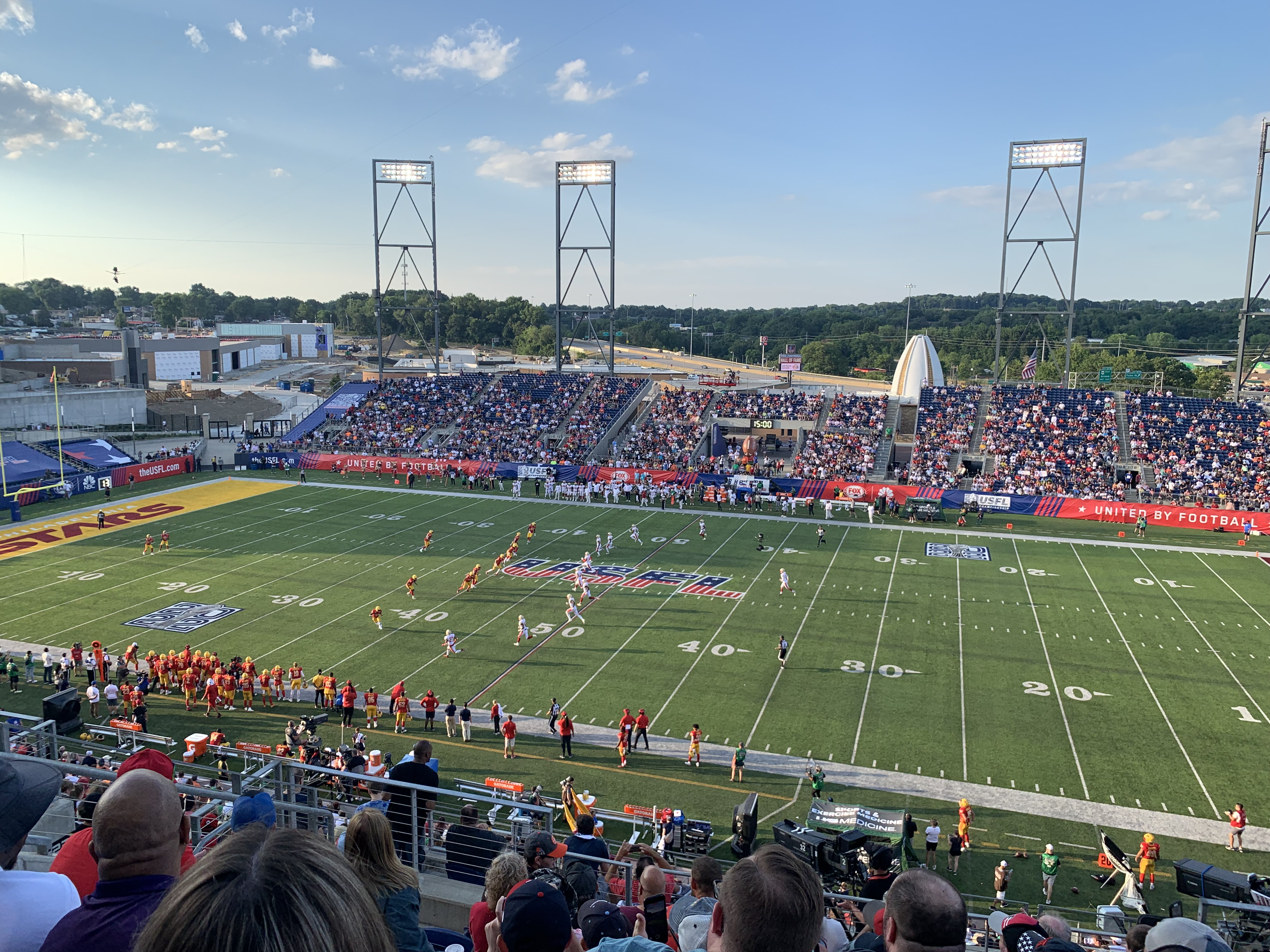
Birmingham kicking off to Philadelphia to begin the game

The game began with Brandon Aubrey's opening kickoff, which was returned by Philadelphia's Maurice Alexander to the Stars' 31-yard-line, where they began their first drive. That drive saw the Stars punt on fourth down after three consecutive incomplete passes by quarterback Case Cookus. The punt from Luis Aguilar was caught by Victor Bolden Jr. at the Birmingham 21-yard-line. The Stallions gained a first down on both of their first two offensive plays; the first was a 12-yard rush by Bo Scarbrough, and the second was a 25-yard pass from J'Mar Smith to Bobby Holly. Smith passed to Marlon Williams for a gain of seven yards several plays later, gaining another first down and putting the Stallions on the Philadelphia 27-yard-line. From there, the offense was only able to gain three additional yards, but scored the game's first points after Aubrey converted a 42-yard field goal to give the Stallions a 3–0 lead. Aubrey's ensuing kickoff was returned by Alexander to the Stars' 34-yard-line, and Philadelphia earned a first down for the first time two plays later with a 9-yard Dexter Williams rush. Immediately afterwards, Cookus passed for 18 and 15 yards to Chris Rowland and Devin Gray, respectively, putting his team in the red zone at the Birmingham 19-yard-line. The Stars got down to the Stallions' 10-yard-line before losing four yards on 3rd & 1, forcing a field goal attempt. The kick was made by Luis Aguilar from a distance of 32 yards, tying the game at three points apiece. Birmingham began their next drive with good field position, after Bolden's kickoff return reached the Philadelphia 48-yard-line. The Stallions faced a 3rd & 7 several plays into the drive before converting with a 9-yard Smith to Williams pass, which was followed up by a 36-yard Scarbrough rush to score the game's first touchdown. Aubrey made the extra point and the Stallions took a 10–3 lead. The Stars took over at their own 35-yard-line but were only able to run two plays before the conclusion of the game's first quarter.

A pass interference penalty on the first play of the second quarter gave the Stars a first down on the Birmingham 48-yard-line. They faced another third down several plays later, which was nullified by a neutral zone infraction penalty which advanced the ball to the Stallions' 37-yard-line. A three-yard gain by Paul Terry followed, but a rush of no gain, an incomplete pass, and a delay of game penalty forced a punt on 4th & 12 that was downed by the coverage team on the Birmingham 1-yard-line. This set the Stars defense up well, which held, forcing a three-and-out just over a minute later after gains of two and six yards on the drive's first two plays. Philadelphia's first play saw Cookus scramble to the Birmingham 26-yard-line but it was called back for a holding penalty to the Stallions' 46-yard-line. The Stars faced 3rd & 16 early in the drive, but converted with a 25-yard pass from Cookus to Jordan Suell. Two plays later, Cookus and Suell connected for another 25-yard pass, this one for a touchdown that narrowed the Stallions' lead to one point. Aguilar's extra point attempt hit the upright, and was no good, keeping the score at 10–9. The Stallions responded quickly, starting with a 19-yard pass from Smith to Bolden and following that up with a 43-yard touchdown pass to Williams, increasing their lead to eight points following Aubrey's extra point. The Stars resumed possession at their own 23-yard-line, and quickly gained first downs with gains of 16 and 19 yards within their first three plays. On 3rd & 7 from the Birmingham 33-yard-line, Cookus was sacked for a loss of 13 yards, forcing a punt on fourth down the next play. Taking over at their 13-yard-line, Scarbrough rushed on each of the drive's first five plays, including for a 69-yard gain on the second play of the drive. The Stallions' offense stalled from there, and Aubrey converted a 28-yard field goal as time expired to go to halftime with a lead of 20–9.

=== Second half ===
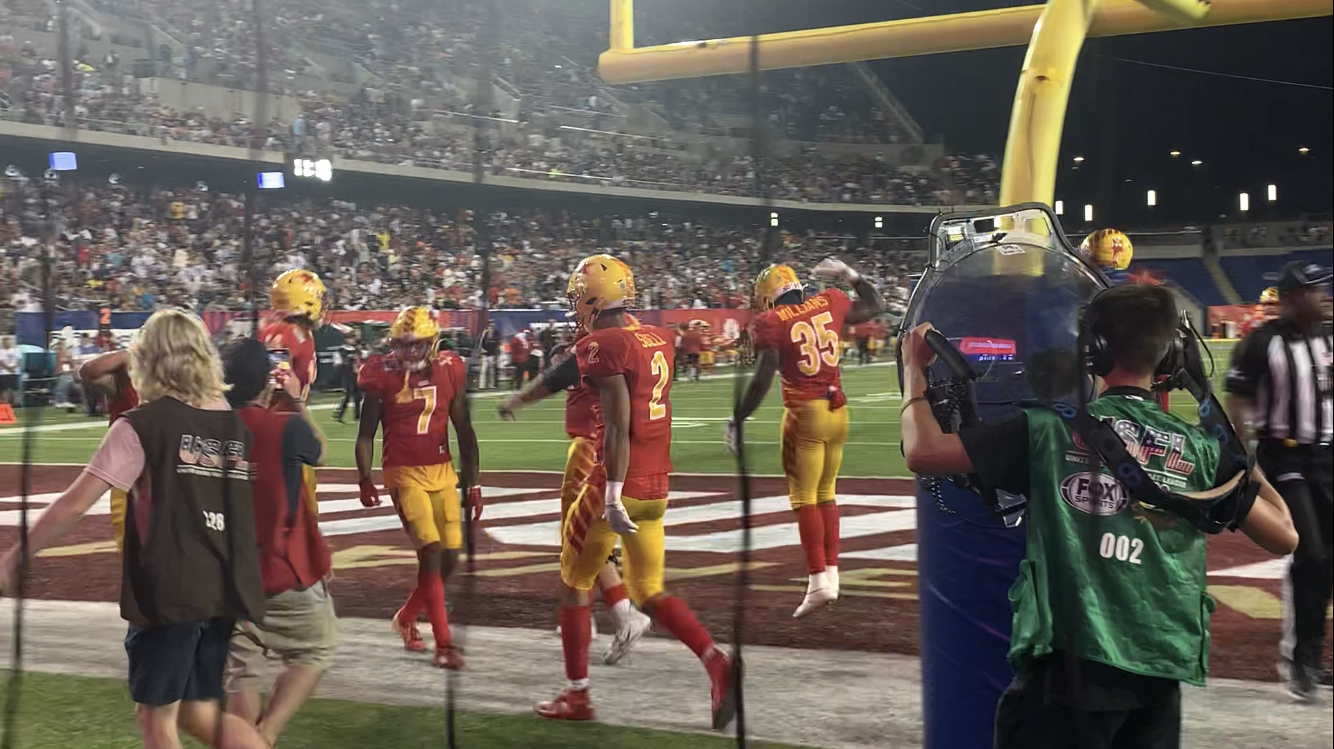
Devin Gray (7) catches a touchdown pass in the fourth quarter to put Philadelphia in the lead

The second half began with Birmingham beginning their drive following a kickoff return that reached the Stallions' own 43-yard-line. A rush of six yards on the first play of the drive set Birmingham up well, but they gained only two yards on the next two plays combined and were forced to punt on 4th & 2 at the Stars' 49-yard-line. The punt was fair caught by Alexander at the Philadelphia 6-yard-line, and the Stars gained a first down after facing 3rd & 3 and gaining sixteen yards on a pass from Cookus to Rowland. Two plays later, Cookus passed to Dexter Williams for a gain of 34 yards, putting the Stars on the Birmingham 30-yard-line with a first down. Another pass of 13 yards on the following play moved the Stars into the red zone, though they faced another third down soon thereafter. An encroachment penalty moved the Stars forward five yards and they converted 3rd & 4 with a 4-yard pass on the next play. After two plays without positive yardage, Cookus completed a pass to Suell in the end zone for a 4-yard touchdown, narrowing the Stallions' lead to five points. The Stars elected to attempt a two-point conversion rather than an extra point with the goal of being able to tie the game with a field goal on their next possession, however the attempt, a rush by Dexter Williams, was unsuccessful after Williams was tackled at the 2-yard-line. Birmingham then got the ball back on a kickoff with 5:17 remaining in the third quarter, beginning at their own 23-yard-line. The Stallions gained two first downs in quick succession with an 11-yard pass from Smith to Bolden followed by a roughing the passer penalty two plays later. After Smith threw an incomplete pass on the next play, he left the game due to cramps, forcing backup quarterback Alex McGough to take over for Birmingham. The Stallions then ran four plays, all rushes, and advanced to the Philadelphia 25-yard-line before the end of the third quarter.

The Stallions began the fourth quarter with McGough's first pass attempt of the contest, which was intended for Bolden but fell incomplete. Scarbrough rushed for five yards on the next play but another incomplete pass from McGough forced Birmingham to attempt a 38-yard field goal, which was missed by Aubrey; this gave the Stars possession of the ball from their own 28-yard-line, the spot at which the kick was taken. A roughing the passer penalty and a 9-yard pass from Cookus to Rowland quickly moved Philadelphia into their opponent's territory, and they continued to move the ball with an 11-yard pass from Cookus to Bug Howard. Williams rushed for 14 yards to set the Stars up at the Birmingham 23-yard-line, but Cookus was sacked by Willie Yarbary on the next play for a loss of six yards. A defensive personal foul moved Philadelphia into the red zone soon afterwards, and Cookus found Gray in the end zone for a touchdown two plays later. The Stars attempted a two-point conversion, which was scored by Suell on a reception. This gave Philadelphia a 23–20 lead, their first of the game. Birmingham started their next drive at their own 22-yard-line and moved the ball quickly, with gains of 9, 11, and 15 yards on their first three plays. On first down at the Stars' 43-yard-line, McGough's pass was intercepted by Jordan Moore—the first turnover of the game—and returned to the Stars' 47-yard-line, giving Philadelphia a chance to increase their lead. They were unable to, however, going three-and-out and punting. The last of these three plays saw Cookus sacked by Dondrea Tillman, which injured Cookus (ultimately causing a broken fibula) and saw him exit the game. The Stallions resumed possession at their own 36-yard-line and found themselves in Stars territory in two plays. Later, on first down at the Stars' 26-yard-line, McGough threw a pass to Williams in the end zone which drew a pass interference penalty, placing the ball on the 11-yard-line; the Stallions scored two plays later on a pass from McGough to Bolden. Aubrey missed the extra point wide left, leaving Birmingham's lead at three points. It increased shortly thereafter, though, as Scooby Wright intercepted new Philadelphia quarterback K. J. Costello and return the pass for a touchdown. The Stallions led by ten points following the extra point. Philadelphia got the ball back with just under three minutes to play, at their own 42-yard-line. They reached the Birmingham 22-yard-line before the two-minute warning and scored a touchdown with 1:43 to play, narrowing the lead to three points. In lieu of a traditional onside kick, the Stars opted to try a 4th & 12 from their own 33-yard-line, which would allow them to keep possession of the ball should they convert it. The play was unsuccessful, though, and the Stallions took over. Scarbrough rushed on three plays in a row, gaining a net total of one yard, and Colby Wadman punted, which resulted in a touchback. After a pass for a gain of seven yards, Costello's pass was intercepted by Birmingham's Christian McFarland at the Stars' 43-yard-line, sealing the victory and the championship for Birmingham. They lined up in victory formation and closed out the game, winning 33–30.

=== Scoring summary ===
2022 USFL championship game

Quarter	1	2	3	4	Total
Philadelphia Stars	3	6	6	15	30
Birmingham Stallions	10	10	0	13	33

at Tom Benson Hall of Fame Stadium • Canton, Ohio

- Date: July 3, 2022
- Game time: 7:30 p.m. EST
- Game weather: Sunny • Temperature: 47 °F (8 °C)
- Game attendance: 20,000
- Referee: Alex Moore
- TV announcers (Fox): Curt Menefee (play-by-play), Joel Klatt (analyst), and Brock Huard (sideline reporter)

Scoring summary

Quarter	Time	Drive			Team	Scoring information	Score	
Quarter	Time	Plays	Yards	TOP	Team	Scoring information	Philadelphia	Birmingham
1	8:39	8	55	4:35	Birmingham	42-yard field goal by Brandon Aubrey	3	0
1	3:49	8	52	4:50	Philadelphia	32-yard field goal by Luis Aguilar	3	3
1	1:24	4	48	2:25	Birmingham	Bo Scarbrough 36-yard touchdown run, Brandon Aubrey kick good	10	3
2	8:07	5	44	2:06	Philadelphia	Jordan Suell 25-yard touchdown reception from Case Cookus, Luis Aguilar kick failed (hit upright)	10	9
2	7:13	2	60	0:54	Birmingham	Marlon Williams 41-yard touchdown reception from J'Mar Smith, Brandon Aubrey kick good	17	9
2	0:00	8	77	4:00	Birmingham	28-yard field goal by Brandon Aubrey	20	9
3	5:17	12	94	7:34	Philadelphia	Jordan Suell 4-yard touchdown reception from Case Cookus, 2-point run failed	20	15
4	11:18	7	72	2:46	Philadelphia	Devin Gray 12-yard touchdown reception from Case Cookus, 2-point pass good	20	23
4	3:09	8	64	4:35	Birmingham	Victor Bolden Jr. 8-yard touchdown reception from Alex McGough, Brandon Aubrey kick failed (wide left)	26	23
4	2:53				Birmingham	Interception returned 46 yards for touchdown by Scooby Wright, Brandon Aubrey kick good	33	23
4	1:43	5	58	1:10	Philadelphia	Chris Rowland 12-yard touchdown reception from K. J. Costello, Luis Aguilar kick good	33	30
"TOP" = time of possession. For other American football terms, see Glossary of American football.							33	30

== Statistics ==
Team statistical comparison
Statistic	Philadelphia	Birmingham
Total plays–net yards	59–340	54–381
Rushing attempts–net yards	17–80	25–175
Yards per rush	4.7	7.0
Yards passing	260	206
Pass completions–attempts	22–38	17–28
Interceptions thrown	2	1
Fumbles lost	0	0
Time of possession	30:25	29:35

Philadelphia statistics
Stars passing
	C–A	Yds	TD–INT
Case Cookus	17–29	222	3–0
K. J. Costello	5–9	65	1–2
Stars rushing
	Car	Yds	TD
Dexter Williams	8	29	0
Chris Rowland	3	29	0
Paul Terry	5	18	0
Case Cookus	1	4	0
Stars receiving
	Rec	Yds	TD
Dexter Williams	4	73	0
Jordan Suell	5	66	2
Chris Rowland	4	55	1
Devin Gray	5	46	1
Bug Howard	2	18	0
Paul Terry	1	16	0
Maurice Alexander	1	13	0

Birmingham statistics
Stallions passing
	C–A	Yds	TD–INT
J'Mar Smith	10–18	131	1–0
Alex McGough	7–10	77	1–1
Stallions rushing
	Car	Yds	TD
Bo Scarbrough	13	135	1
C. J. Marable	7	23	0
Alex McGough	4	15	0
J'Mar Smith	1	2	0
Stallions receiving
	Rec	Yds	TD
Marlon Williams	7	105	1
Victor Bolden Jr.	6	64	1
Bobby Holly	1	25	0
Sage Surratt	1	9	0
Adrian Hardy	1	5	0
Osirus Mitchell	1	0	0

== Aftermath ==
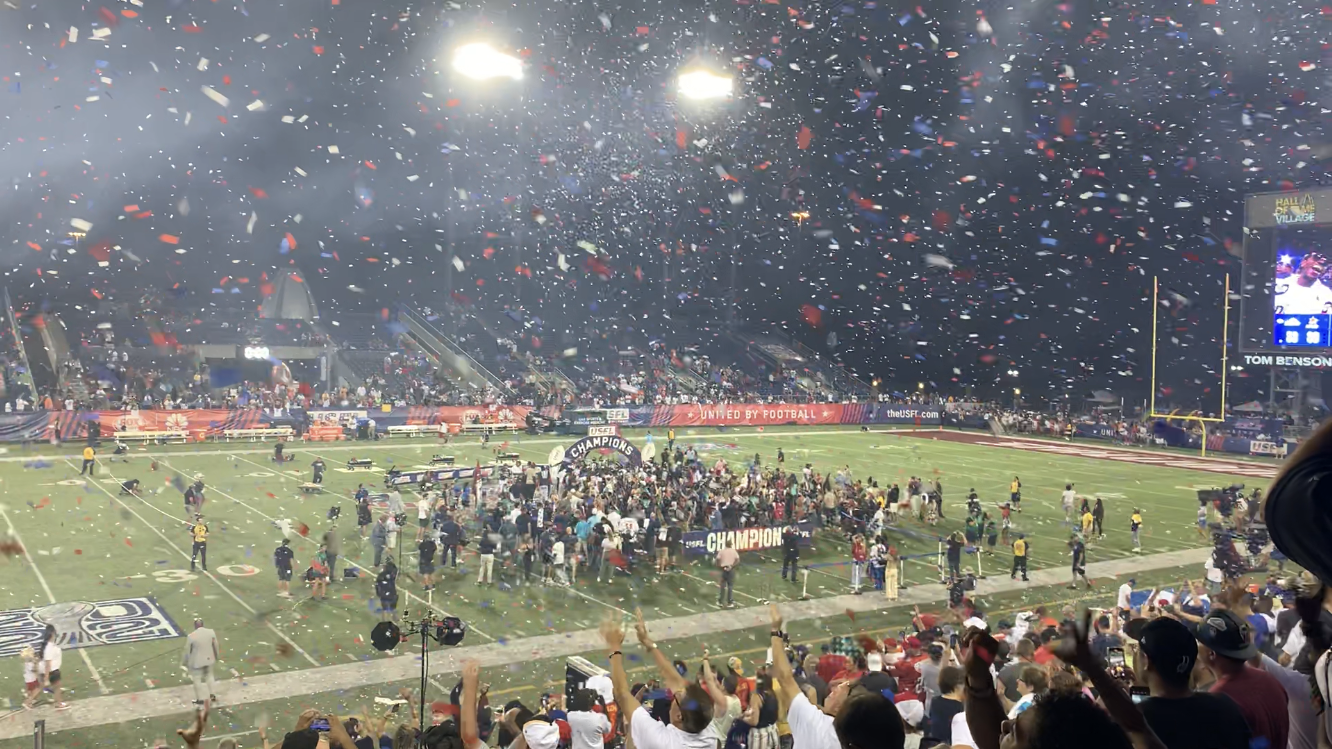
Post-game confetti

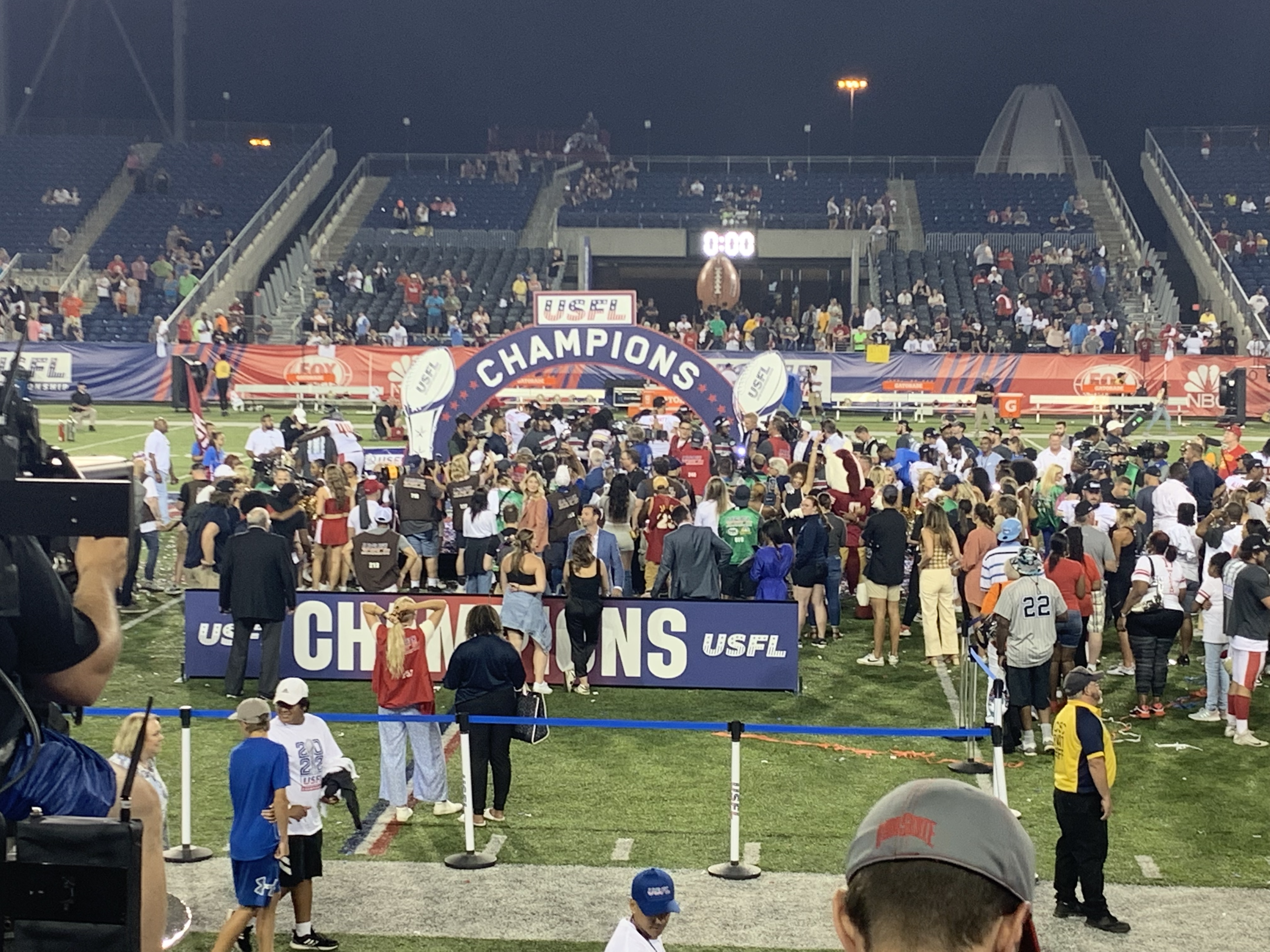
Championship podium during post-game

Stallions wide receiver Victor Bolden Jr., previously named to the all-USFL team, was named the game's Most Valuable Player. Fox has announced that the league would return in April 2023, featuring the same eight teams that competed during the 2022 season, although in early 2023 the Tampa Bay Bandits were replaced by the Memphis Showboats.

== See also ==
- UFL Championship Game
- USFL Championship Game
- XFL Championship Game
