= Matt Colburn =

American football player (born 1997)

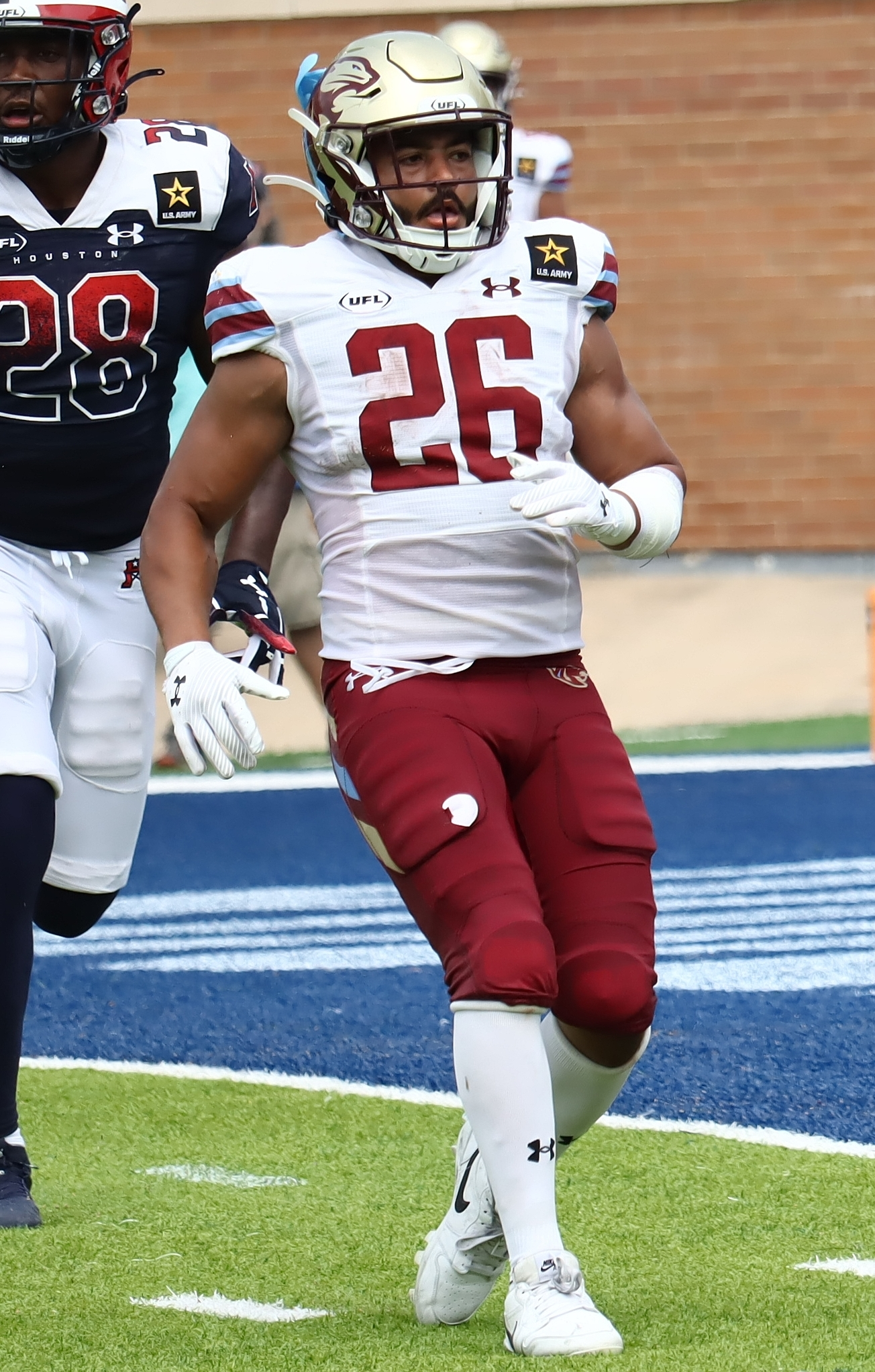
- Colburn with the Michigan Panthers in 2024

Profile
- Position: Running back

Personal information
- Born: July 27, 1997 (age 29); Irmo, South Carolina, U.S.
- Listed height: 5 ft 10 in (1.78 m)
- Listed weight: 201 lb (91 kg)

Career information
- High school: Dutch Fork (SC)
- College: Wake Forest
- NFL draft: 2019: undrafted

Career history
- Los Angeles Rams (2019)*; New York Guardians (2020); TSL Blues (2020); Toronto Argonauts (2021)*; Philadelphia Stars (2022); Jacksonville Jaguars (2022)*; Philadelphia Stars (2023); Michigan Panthers (2024–2025)
- * Offseason or practice squad member only

Awards and highlights
- USFL Sportsman of the Year (2022)

Career USFL statistics as of Week 9, 2022
- Games played: 9
- Rush attempts: 92
- Rushing yards: 418
- Rushing touchdowns: 7
- Stats at Pro Football Reference

Matthew Colburn II (born July 27, 1997) is an American professional football running back. He played college football at Wake Forest.

== Early life and education ==
Colburn was born on July 27, 1997, and grew up in Irmo, South Carolina. He attended Dutch Fork High School and set schools records as a junior with 2,448 rushing yards and 40 touchdowns. As a senior, he ran for 1,705 yards and scored 24 touchdowns, being named the 2014 SC "Mr. Football."

Colburn initially committed to Louisville but was told shortly before signing day that the school had no room for him. He then signed with Wake Forest, declining offers from Marshall, Georgia Southern and Furman. In his debut against Elon, Colburn ran for 38 yards on 12 carries and scored his first career touchdown. He led the team with 51 yards against Florida State.

As a sophomore, Colburn led the team with 626 rushing yards. In a win against Delaware, he made a career-high 24 carries for 118 yards and scored a touchdown. He ran for 103 yards the following week, becoming the first player with back-to-back 100-yard rushing games at Wake Forest since 2011. In his junior year, Colburn placed first in the school with 904 yards rushing. He ran for 237 yards against Syracuse on November 11. He was named to the ESPN All-ACC Bowl team at the end of the season.

Colburn ran for 759 yards and scored five touchdowns as a senior, finishing his career sixth in team history with 2,528 yards rushing. Against Louisville, who had pulled his scholarship in 2015, Colburn ran for a career-high 243 yards and scored three touchdowns.

== Professional career ==
Pre-draft measurables
Height	Weight	Arm length	Hand span	40-yard dash	10-yard split	20-yard split	20-yard shuttle	Three-cone drill	Vertical jump	Broad jump	Bench press
5 ft 7 3/4 in (1.72 m)	204 lb (93 kg)	27 7/8 in (0.71 m)	8 3/4 in (0.22 m)	4.47 s	1.60 s	2.53 s	4.27 s	6.72 s	31.0 in (0.79 m)	9 ft 5 in (2.87 m)	25 reps
All values from Pro Day

=== Los Angeles Rams ===
After going unselected in the 2019 NFL draft, Colburn was signed by the Los Angeles Rams as an undrafted free agent. He was waived at the final roster cuts on August 30.

=== New York Guardians ===
In 2020, Colburn was signed by the New York Guardians of the XFL. He played in just two games for the Guardians, making one rush attempt for six yards.

=== TSL Blues ===
Later in the year, he played for the Blues of The Spring League, gaining almost 200 yards in week two and in week three.

=== Toronto Argonauts ===
On February 15, 2021, Colburn was signed by the Toronto Argonauts of the Canadian Football League (CFL). He was released on July 20.

=== Philadelphia Stars (first stint) ===
Colburn was selected in the 28th round of the 2022 USFL draft by the Philadelphia Stars. In his first game for the Stars, he played as a backup and made nine rush attempts for 14 yards. He was placed on injured reserve on June 29, 2022. Colburn was given the 2022 USFL Sportsman of the Year Award, awarded to the one who shows the "best-exhibited excellence on the field and leadership to the community off the field."

=== Jacksonville Jaguars ===
On August 7, 2022, Colburn was signed by the Jacksonville Jaguars. He was waived on August 15.

=== Philadelphia Stars (second stint) ===
Colburn re-signed with the Philadelphia Stars on November 9, 2022. He was placed on injured reserve on June 6, 2023. The Stars folded when the XFL and USFL merged to create the United Football League (UFL).

=== Michigan Panthers ===
Colburn was selected by the Michigan Panthers during the 2024 UFL dispersal draft on January 5, 2024. He re-signed with the team on August 13, 2024. On April 10, 2025, Colburn was placed on injured reserve. He was activated on May 12.

=== Statistics ===
USFL statistics
Year	Team	Games		Rushing					Receiving					Return yards					Fumbles	
Year	Team	GP	GS	Att	Yds	Avg	Lng	TD	Rec	Yds	Avg	Lng	TD	Att	Yds	Avg	Lng	TD	Fum	Lost
2022	PHI	10	4	102	457	4.5	51	8	18	150	8.3	21	1	3	53	17.7	29	0	2	2
2023	PHI	1	1	5	30	6.0	18	0	2	14	7.0	9	1	0	0	0	0	0	0	0
Career		11	5	107	487	4.6	51	8	20	164	8.2	21	2	3	53	17.7	29	0	2	2
