= Dexter Williams =

American football player (born 1997)

No. 22
- Position: Running back

Personal information
- Born: January 6, 1997 (age 29); Orlando, Florida, U.S.
- Listed height: 5 ft 11 in (1.80 m)
- Listed weight: 212 lb (96 kg)

Career information
- High school: West Orange (Winter Garden, Florida)
- College: Notre Dame (2015–2018)
- NFL draft: 2019: 6th round, 194th overall pick

Career history
- Green Bay Packers (2019–2020); New York Giants (2021)*; Cleveland Browns (2021)*; Miami Dolphins (2021)*; Cleveland Browns (2021); Philadelphia Stars (2022); Green Bay Packers (2022)*; Philadelphia Stars (2023)
- * Offseason or practice squad member only

Career NFL statistics
- Rushing yards: 19
- Rushing average: 2.7
- Stats at Pro Football Reference

Dexter Vidal Williams (born January 6, 1997) is an American former professional football player who was a running back in the National Football League (NFL). He played college football for the Notre Dame Fighting Irish and was selected by the Green Bay Packers in the sixth round of the 2019 NFL draft.

== College career ==
Williams attended and played college football at the University of Notre Dame. He contributed from 2015 to 2018, amassing over 1,600 rushing yards and 20 rushing touchdowns in his collegiate career.

== Professional career ==
Pre-draft measurables
Height	Weight	Arm length	Hand span	40-yard dash	20-yard shuttle	Three-cone drill	Vertical jump	Broad jump	Bench press
5 ft 11 1/8 in (1.81 m)	212 lb (96 kg)	32 1/4 in (0.82 m)	9 5/8 in (0.24 m)	4.57 s	4.16 s	7.00 s	36.0 in (0.91 m)	10 ft 10 in (3.30 m)	17 reps
All values from NFL Combine

=== Green Bay Packers (first stint) ===
Williams was selected by the Green Bay Packers in the sixth round of the 2019 NFL draft. The Packers traded quarterback Brett Hundley to the Seattle Seahawks in order to obtain the selection used to select Williams. On May 3, 2019, he signed his rookie contract with the Packers. He made his NFL debut on October 20, 2019, during a Week 7 win over the Oakland Raiders, rushing three times for two yards. He saw further action on December 29 during a Week 17 win over the Detroit Lions, temporarily replacing an injured Aaron Jones.

Williams was waived on September 5, 2020, and re-signed to the practice squad five days later. He was elevated to the active roster on October 24 and November 5 for the team's weeks 7 and 9 games against the Houston Texans and San Francisco 49ers, and reverted to the practice squad after each game. He was placed on the practice squad/injured list on November 11, 2020, and restored to the practice squad on December 15. He was elevated again on December 26 for the week 16 game against the Tennessee Titans, and reverted to the practice squad again following the game. He was released on January 23, 2021. On January 25, 2021, Williams signed a reserve/futures contract with the Packers.

On August 31, 2021, Packers released Williams as part of their final roster cuts.

=== New York Giants ===
On September 2, 2021, Williams was signed to the New York Giants practice squad. He was released on September 22, 2021. On November 5, 2021, Williams was signed back to the New York Giants practice squad and released four days later.

=== Cleveland Browns (first stint) ===
Williams was signed to the Cleveland Browns' practice squad on November 10, 2021. He was released on November 23, 2021.

=== Miami Dolphins ===
On December 13, 2021, Williams was signed to the Miami Dolphins practice squad.

=== Cleveland Browns (second stint) ===
Williams was signed to the Cleveland Browns' active roster off the Dolphins' practice squad on January 5, 2022.

=== Philadelphia Stars (first stint) ===
Williams signed with the Philadelphia Stars of the United States Football League (USFL) on June 29, 2022.

=== Green Bay Packers (second stint) ===
On August 10, 2022, Williams signed with the Green Bay Packers He was waived on August 30, 2022.

=== Philadelphia Stars (second stint) ===
Williams was selected by the Arlington Renegades of the XFL in the 2023 XFL draft, but re-signed with the Stars of the USFL on November 24, 2022. The Stars folded when the XFL and USFL merged to create the United Football League (UFL).

== Professional career statistics ==
Year	League	Team	Games		Rushing					Receiving					Fumbles	
Year	League	Team	GP	GS	Att	Yds	Avg	Lng	TD	Rec	Yds	Avg	Lng	TD	Fum	Lost
2019	NFL	GB	4	0	5	11	2.2	5	0	0	0	0.0	0	0	0	0
2020	NFL	GB	3	0	2	8	4.0	5	0	0	0	0.0	0	0	0	0
2023	USFL	PHI	1	0	9	11	1.2	12	1	1	3	3.0	3	0	0	0
Career			8	0	16	30	1.9	12	1	1	3	3.0	3	0	0	0

== Personal life ==
Williams is from Winter Garden, Florida and attended Olympia High School before transferring to West Orange High School.
