= Evan Worthington =

American football player (born 1995)

No. 6
- Position: Safety

Personal information
- Born: September 18, 1995 (age 31); Aurora, Colorado, U.S.
- Listed height: 6 ft 2 in (1.88 m)
- Listed weight: 210 lb (95 kg)

Career information
- High school: Cherokee Trail (Aurora, Colorado)
- College: Colorado
- NFL draft: 2019: undrafted

Career history
- Baltimore Ravens (2019)*; Calgary Stampeders (2020)*; Philadelphia Stars (2022–2023); San Antonio Brahmas (2024)*
- * Offseason or practice squad member only

Evan Worthington (born Evan White, September 18, 1995) is an American former football safety. He played college football at Colorado.

== Professional career ==
Pre-draft measurables
Height	Weight	Arm length	Hand span	40-yard dash	10-yard split	20-yard split	20-yard shuttle	Three-cone drill	Vertical jump	Broad jump	Bench press
6 ft 2 in (1.88 m)	210 lb (95 kg)	32 3/8 in (0.82 m)	10 1/4 in (0.26 m)	4.63 s	1.66 s	2.75 s	4.37 s	7.07 s	33.5 in (0.85 m)	10 ft 1 in (3.07 m)	17 reps
All values from NFL Combine

=== Baltimore Ravens ===
After going unselected in the 2019 NFL draft, Worthington was signed as an undrafted free agent by the Baltimore Ravens. He was waived on May 6, 2019.

=== Calgary Stampeders ===
On February 13, 2020, Worthington signed a contract with the Calgary Stampeders of the Canadian Football League (CFL), but the season was cancelled.

=== TSL Generals ===
In 2021, Worthington played for the Generals of The Spring League.

=== Philadelphia Stars ===
Worthington was signed by the Philadelphia Stars of the United States Football League (USFL) on April 1, 2022. He became a free agent after the 2023 season.

=== San Antonio Brahmas ===
On December 13, 2023, Worthington signed with the San Antonio Brahmas of the XFL. He was not part of the roster after the 2024 UFL dispersal draft on January 15, 2024.
