= Case Cookus =

American gridiron football player (born 1995)

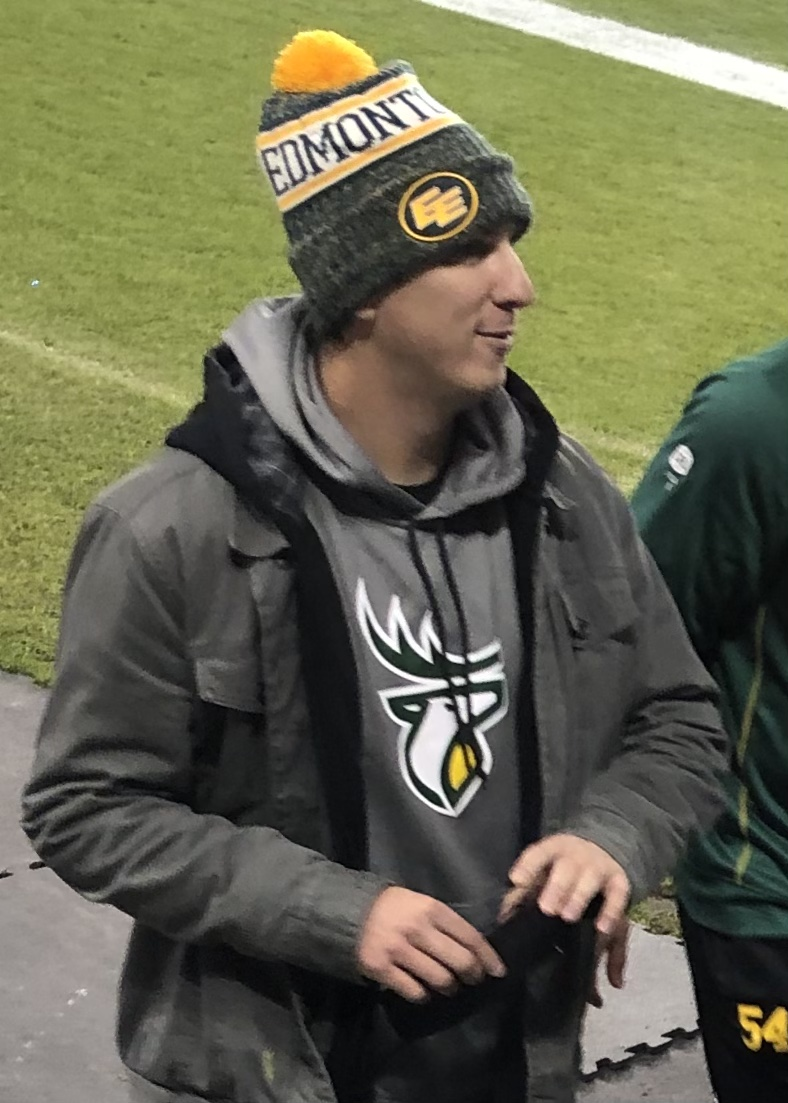
- Cookus with the Edmonton Elks in 2021

No. 10, 15
- Position: Quarterback

Personal information
- Born: October 6, 1995 (age 31); Thousand Oaks, California, U.S.
- Listed height: 6 ft 4 in (1.93 m)
- Listed weight: 205 lb (93 kg)

Career information
- High school: Thousand Oaks (CA)
- College: Northern Arizona (2015–2019)
- NFL draft: 2020: undrafted

Career history
- New York Giants (2020)*; Denver Broncos (2021)*; Minnesota Vikings (2021)*; Las Vegas Raiders (2021)*; Edmonton Elks (2021); Philadelphia Stars (2022); Los Angeles Rams (2022)*; Philadelphia Stars (2023); Memphis Showboats (2024); Birmingham Stallions (2025)
- * Offseason or practice squad member only

Awards and highlights
- Jerry Rice Award (2015); STATS FCS Freshman Player of the Year (2015); Big Sky Conference Co-Freshman of the Year (2015); 2x First-team All-Big Sky (2015, 2017)

Career spring football statistics as of Week 6, 2025
- Passing attempts: 774
- Passing completions: 479
- Completion percentage: 61.9
- TD–INT: 38-19
- Passing yards: 4,964
- QB rating: 86.5
- Rushing yards: 678
- Rushing touchdowns: 1

Stephen Case Cookus (born October 6, 1995), nicknamed "the Chef", is an American former professional football quarterback. As a true freshman at Northern Arizona University, he was named the recipient of the 2015 Jerry Rice Award and the STATS FCS Freshman Player of the Year Award, both of which are awarded to the most outstanding freshman player in the NCAA Division I Football Championship Subdivision. He holds the record for most combined passing and rushing touchdowns in a USFL game with five, which he accomplished in a game against the Michigan Panthers on June 5, 2022.

== College career ==
=== 2015 ===
As a true freshman, Cookus began the season as the starting quarterback. After throwing for 3,111 yards and 37 touchdowns, he was named Freshman of the Year and was the winner of the Jerry Rice Award, which is given to the most outstanding freshman in the Football Championship Subdivision. He was also named to the All-Big Sky First-team.

=== 2016 ===
In the 2016 season, Cookus started the first four games of the season before suffering a season-ending shoulder injury against Eastern Washington on September 24. Against New Mexico Highlands, he tied school record of seven touchdown passes in a single game. For the season, he threw for 1,173 passing yards with 13 touchdowns and one interception.

=== 2017 ===
Cookus made a comeback season in 2017. His best game came against Cal Poly where he completed 35 of 46 passes for 406 yards and four touchdowns. For the season, he threw 275 passes on 474 attempts for 3,413 yards with 22 touchdowns and 6 interceptions. Cookus took Northern Arizona to the playoffs, but lost 41–20 in the first round to San Diego after throwing 22 of 41 for 178 yards, a touchdown, and an interception. Against Montana, Cookus was ejected for targeting after throwing a downfield block, a very rare occurrence since targeting is almost exclusively called against defensive players.

=== 2018 ===
During the second game of the season against Eastern Washington, Cookus once again injured his shoulder while trying to run the ball. He finished the season completing 24 passes on 34 attempts for 265 yards with two touchdowns and two interceptions, including an 84-yard strike to wide receiver Emmanuel Butler in the season opener.

=== 2019 ===
In 2019, Cookus led the FCS with 4,114 passing yards and passing yards per game with a 348.8 per game average. Against FBS foe Arizona, Cookus threw for 373 yards and two touchdowns. Cookus threw a touchdown pass in all 12 games, including at least three touchdowns in five games. He threw for a season high 450 yards in his final collegiate game in an overtime loss against Idaho.

=== Statistics ===
Legend
	Led NCAA Division I FCS
**Bold**	Career high

Season	Team	Games			Passing								Rushing			
Season	Team	GP	GS	Record	Cmp	Att	Pct	Yds	Y/A	TD	Int	Rtg	Att	Yds	Avg	TD
2015	NAU	11	11	7–4	223	323	69.0	3,117	9.7	37	5	184.8	90	209	2.3	3
2016	NAU	4	4	1–3	80	119	67.2	1,173	9.9	13	1	184.4	16	41	2.6	0
2017	NAU	12	12	7–5	275	474	58.0	3,413	7.2	22	6	131.3	53	−14	−0.3	2
2018	NAU	2	2	1–1	24	34	70.6	265	7.8	2	2	143.7	2	−23	−11.5	0
2019	NAU	12	12	4–8	290	481	60.3	4,114	8.6	31	7	150.5	45	19	0.4	1
Career		41	41	20–21	892	1,431	62.3	12,082	8.4	105	21	154.5	206	232	1.1	6

== Professional career ==
Pre-draft measurables
Height	Weight
6 ft 2 5/8 in (1.90 m)	205 lb (93 kg)
Values from Pro Day

=== New York Giants ===
Cookus signed with the New York Giants as an undrafted free agent on April 28, 2020. He was waived by the Giants on August 2.

=== Denver Broncos ===
On May 17, 2021, Cookus signed with the Denver Broncos, but was waived three days later on May 20.

=== Minnesota Vikings ===
On August 2, 2021, Cookus signed with the Minnesota Vikings, but was waived three days later on August 5.

=== Las Vegas Raiders ===
On August 10, 2021, Cookus signed with the Las Vegas Raiders. He was waived by the Raiders on August 16.

=== Edmonton Elks ===
On October 20, 2021, Cookus signed with the CFL's Edmonton Elks. He was released by Edmonton five days later.

=== Philadelphia Stars (first stint) ===
Cookus was selected in the 12th round of the 2022 USFL draft by the Philadelphia Stars. He led the Stars into the championship game, but had to depart the game with a broken leg.

=== Los Angeles Rams ===
On November 23, 2022, Cookus signed with the practice squad of the Los Angeles Rams. His practice squad contract expired when the team's season ended on January 9, 2023.

=== Philadelphia Stars (second stint) ===
On February 17, 2023, Cookus re-signed with the Stars. The Stars folded when the XFL and USFL merged to create the United Football League (UFL).

=== Memphis Showboats ===
On January 5, 2024, Cookus was selected by the Memphis Showboats during the 2024 UFL dispersal draft.

=== Birmingham Stallions ===
On March 5, 2025, Cookus signed with the Birmingham Stallions of the United Football League (UFL).

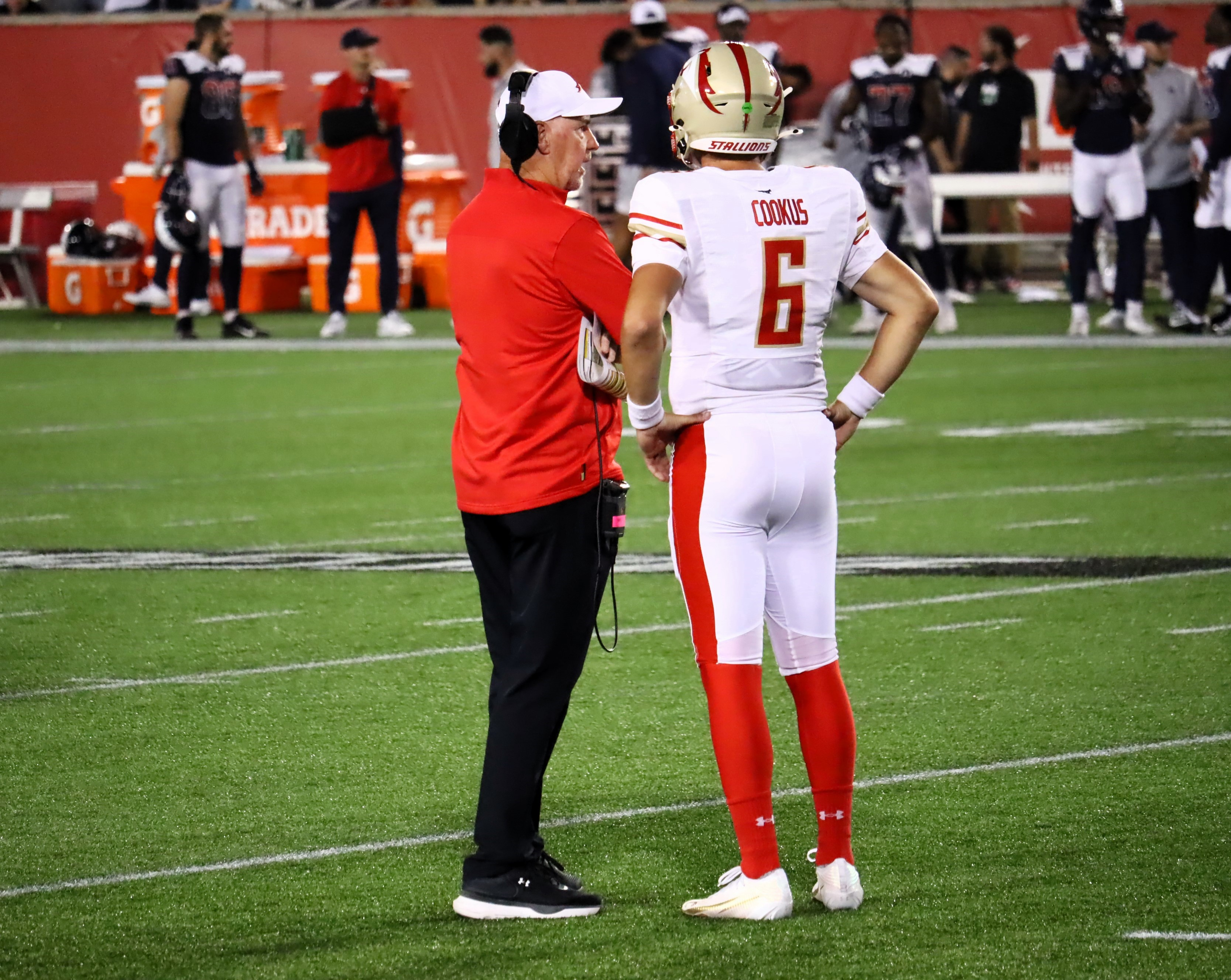
Cokus with Birmingham in 2025

In week four, Cookus made his Stallions debut against the Houston Roughnecks when starting quarterback Matt Corral went down with an injury late in the fourth quarter. Cookus converted a key third down conversion finding wide receiver Davion Davis on his first pass attempt on the season. The 36-yard completion helped seal the game for Birmingham. In week five, Cookus started against Memphis. He passed for 145 yards, two touchdowns and an interception. Cookus also ran for 83 yards in the 20–24 overtime loss.

== Career statistics ==
Legend
	Led the league
**Bold**	Career high

=== Regular season ===
Year	Team	League	Games			Passing								Rushing			
Year	Team	League	GP	GS	Record	Cmp	Att	Pct	Yds	Y/A	TD	Int	Rtg	Att	Yds	Avg	TD
2022	PHI	USFL	9	7	**5–2**	130	208	62.5	1,334	6.4	12	5	**90.1**	22	217	**9.9**	**1**
2023	PHI	USFL	**10**	**10**	4–6	**218**	**347**	**62.8**	**2,294**	**6.6**	**15**	**9**	85.6	52	**277**	5.3	0
2024	MEM	UFL	9	6	1–5	99	161	61.5	989	6.1	7	4	83.1	19	86	4.5	0
2025	BHAM	UFL	4	3	2–1	49	92	53.3	546	5.9	5	2	80.3	15	134	8.9	0
Career			31	26	12–14	496	808	61.4	5,170	6.4	39	20	85.7	109	730	6.7	1

=== Postseason ===
Year	Team	League	Games			Passing								Rushing			
Year	Team	League	GP	GS	Record	Cmp	Att	Pct	Yds	Y/A	TD	Int	Rtg	Att	Yds	Avg	TD
2022	PHI	USFL	2	2	1–1	27	49	55.1	355	7.2	3	1	90.1	5	43	8.6	1
