= Devin Gray (American football) =

American football player (born 1995)

No. 15
- Position: Wide receiver

Personal information
- Born: June 15, 1995 (age 31); Reno, Nevada, U.S.
- Listed height: 6 ft 0 in (1.83 m)
- Listed weight: 192 lb (87 kg)

Career information
- High school: Edward C. Reed (Sparks, Nevada)
- College: Cincinnati
- NFL draft: 2018: undrafted

Career history
- Atlanta Falcons (2018–2020); Baltimore Ravens (2021)*; Philadelphia Stars (2022); Kansas City Chiefs (2022)*; Philadelphia Stars (2023); Michigan Panthers (2024)
- * Offseason or practice squad member only
- Stats at Pro Football Reference

Devin Michael Gray (born June 15, 1995) is an American former professional football wide receiver. He played college football at Cincinnati, and played for the Atlanta Falcons of the National Football League (NFL), Philadelphia Stars of the United States Football League (USFL), and the Michigan Panthers of the United Football League (UFL).

== Professional career ==
Pre-draft measurables
Height	Weight	Arm length	Hand span	Wingspan	40-yard dash	10-yard split	20-yard split	20-yard shuttle	Three-cone drill	Vertical jump	Broad jump	Bench press
5 ft 11 3/8 in (1.81 m)	183 lb (83 kg)	30 3/4 in (0.78 m)	9 3/8 in (0.24 m)	6 ft 1 5/8 in (1.87 m)	4.41 s	1.50 s	2.57 s	4.19 s	6.90 s	35.5 in (0.90 m)	10 ft 5 in (3.18 m)	15 reps
All values from Pro Day

=== Atlanta Falcons ===
Gray signed with the Atlanta Falcons as an undrafted free agent on May 1, 2018. He was waived on September 1, 2018, and was signed to the practice squad the next day. He signed a reserve/future contract with the Falcons on December 31, 2018.

On August 31, 2019, Gray was waived by the Falcons. He was re-signed to the practice squad on October 23, 2019. He signed a reserve/future contract with the Falcons on December 31, 2019.

On September 5, 2020, Gray was waived by the Falcons. He was signed to their practice squad on November 23, 2020. He was elevated to the active roster on January 2, 2021, for the team's week 17 game against the Tampa Bay Buccaneers, and reverted to the practice squad after the game. His practice squad contract with the team expired after the season on January 11, 2021.

=== Baltimore Ravens ===
Gray signed a one-year deal with the Baltimore Ravens on June 3, 2021, he was released in the final roster cuts on August 30, 2021, and re-signed to the practice squad shortly after. On September 27, 2021, he was released.

=== Philadelphia Stars (first stint) ===
Gray was selected in the 13th round of the 2022 USFL draft by the Philadelphia Stars. He was transferred to the team's inactive roster on April 22, 2022, with an ankle injury. He was transferred to the active roster on April 30.

=== Kansas City Chiefs ===
On August 6, 2022, Gray signed with the Kansas City Chiefs. He was released on August 16, 2022.

=== Philadelphia Stars (second stint) ===
Gray re-signed with the Stars on October 5, 2022. The Stars folded when the XFL and USFL merged to create the United Football League (UFL).

=== Michigan Panthers ===
On January 5, 2024, Gray was selected by the Michigan Panthers during the 2024 UFL dispersal draft. He re-signed with the Panthers on August 12, 2024. He announced his retirement on January 22, 2025.

=== Statistics ===
USFL statistics
Year	Team	Games		Receiving					Fumbles	
Year	Team	GP	GS	Rec	Yds	Avg	Lng	TD	Fum	Lost
2022	PHI	8	8	25	210	8.4	39	2	0	0
2023	PHI	1	1	7	77	11.0	17	1	0	0
Career		9	9	32	287	9.0	39	3	0	0
