= Philadelphia Stars (2022) =

Football team based in Philadelphia

Logo

General information
- Founded: 2021
- Folded: 2023
- Headquartered: Ford Field in Detroit, Michigan
- Colors: Red, orange, gold, white
- Mascot: Blob

Personnel
- Owners: National Spring Football League Enterprises Co, LLC, (Fox Sports)
- General manager: Michael Woods (2023)
- Head coach: Bart Andrus (2022–2023)

Team history
- Philadelphia Stars (2022–2023)

Home fields
- Protective Stadium / Legion Field (2022); Ford Field (2023)

League / conference affiliations
- United States Football League (2022–2023): North Division (2022–2023)

Playoff appearances (1)
- 2022

The Philadelphia Stars were a professional American football team based in Philadelphia, Pennsylvania. The Stars competed in the United States Football League (USFL) as a member club of the league's North division. The team played its home games at Protective Stadium and Legion Field, both in Alabama, in 2022, and Ford Field in Detroit, Michigan, in 2023. Ultimately, the team would never play a game in Philadelphia. The Stars appeared in the playoffs once, won the division championship game once, and appeared in one USFL Championship Game.

On December 19, 2023, the USFL informed its players union that the Stars would not be among four USFL teams to be contracted as part of the league's upcoming merger with the XFL.

== History ==
The Philadelphia Stars were one of eight teams that were officially announced as a USFL franchise on The Herd with Colin Cowherd on November 22, 2021. On January 6, 2022, It was announced on The Herd with Colin Cowherd that former CFL Head coach Bart Andrus was named the head coach and general manager of the Stars. Andrus later announced most of his staff on January 28, 2022, on the Dan Sileo Show.

During the 2022 USFL draft, the Stars selected quarterback Bryan Scott with the 3rd overall pick, and selected highly touted cornberback, Channing Stribling.

After training camp, Scott was officially named the Stars' starting quarterback for the 2022 season by head coach Andrus. After starting the season 2–3, the Stars went 4–1 in their last five games, clinching a playoff berth in week 8 after a victory over the Michigan Panthers. They went on to beat the New Jersey Generals 19–14 in the North Division Championship game, earning them their first USFL Championship Game appearance. However, despite erasing a halftime 11-point deficit, they ultimately lost on a late touchdown to the Birmingham Stallions, 33–30.

On December 19, 2023, the USFL informed its players union that the Stars would not be among the four USFL teams to be contracted as part of the league's upcoming merger with the XFL.

== Player history ==
=== Notable players ===
USFL Season	Pos	Name	Notes
2023	WR	Corey Coleman	Former Cleveland Browns Wide Receiver, 2016 1st Round Pick
2023	TE	Ryan Izzo	Former New England Patriots Tight End, 2018 7th Round Pick

== Coach history ==
=== Head coach history ===
#	Name	Term	Regular season				Playoffs			Awards
#	Name	Term	GC	W	L	Win %	GC	W	L	Awards
Philadelphia Stars
1	Bart Andrus	2022–2023	20	10	10	.500	2	1	1	

*Andrus also served as the team offensive coordinator

=== Defensive coordinator history ===
#	Name	Term	Regular season				Playoffs			Awards
#	Name	Term	GC	W	L	Win %	GC	W	L	Awards
Philadelphia Stars
1	Brad Miller	2022–2023	20	10	10	.500	2	1	1	

== Championships ==
=== North Division championships ===
Season	Coach	Location	Opponent	Score
2022	Bart Andrus	Tom Benson Hall of Fame Stadium (Canton, Ohio)	New Jersey Generals	19–14
Total North Division Championships won: 1				

== Records ==
All-time Stars leaders
Leader	Player	Record	Years with Stars
Passing yards	Case Cookus	3,628 passing yards	2022–2023
Passing Touchdowns	Case Cookus	27 passing touchdowns	2022–2023
Rushing yards	Matt Colburn	721 rushing yards	2022–2023
Rushing Touchdowns	Matt Colburn	12 touchdowns	2022–2023
Receiving yards	Devin Gray	715 receiving yards	2022–2023
Receiving Touchdowns	Diondre Overton	5 receiving touchdowns	2022–2023
Receptions	Devin Gray	76 receptions	2022–2023
Tackles	Cody Brown	118 tackles	2022–2023
Sacks	Adam Rodriguez	15.0 sacks	2022–2023
Interceptions	Channing Stribling	8 interceptions	2022–2023
Coaching wins	Bart Andrus	10 wins	2022–2023

== Statistics and records ==
=== Season-by-season record ===
Note: The finish, wins, losses, and ties columns list regular season results and exclude any postseason play.

Legend
USFL champions^{†}	Division champions^{^}	Wild Card berth^{#}

Philadelphia Stars season-by-season records
Season	Team	League	Division	Regular season					Postseason results	Awards
Season	Team	League	Division	Finish	Wins	Losses	Ties	Pct	Postseason results	Awards
2022	2022	USFL	North	2nd^{#}	6	4	0	.600	Won Division finals (Generals) 19–14; Lost USFL Championship Game (Stallions) 30–33	Matt Colburn (SMOY); Maurice Alexander (ND MVP)
2023	2023	USFL	North	3rd	4	6	0	.400	–	–
Totals					10	10	0	.500	(2022–2023, regular season)	
Totals					1	1	—	.500	(2022–2023, playoffs)	
Totals					11	11	0	.500	(2022–2023, regular season and playoffs)	

=== Mascot ===
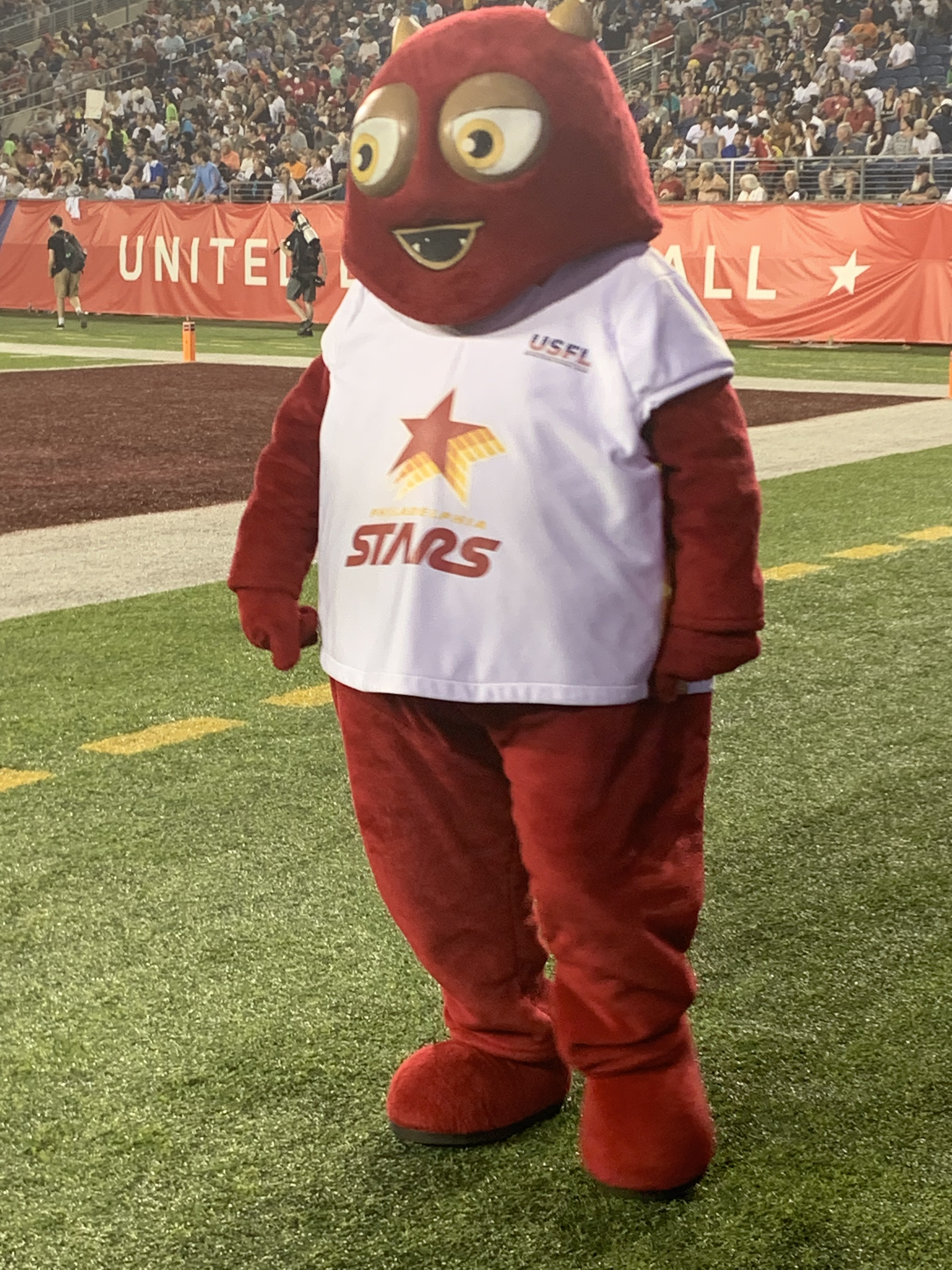
Blob

On April 11, 2022, the Stars unveiled their mascot, a monstrous red creature that drew comparisons to other Philadelphia sports mascots Gritty and the Phillie Phanatic. The Stars then held a Twitter poll asking fans whether the mascot should be named "Astro", "Cosmo", or "Blob". "Blob" took 65 percent of the vote, and the name was confirmed on April 15. The Stars have offered few details about Blob besides describing him as "out of this world" and noting that he enjoys dancing.

=== Rivalries ===
==== Key Stone State Battle ====
The Philadelphia Stars shared a rivalry with their cross-state foes the Pittsburgh Maulers called the Key Stone State Battle. The Stars went 3–1 against Pittsburgh during both USFL seasons.

==== Franchise matchup history ====
Team	Record	Pct.
Memphis Showboats	1–0	1.000
Tampa Bay Bandits	1–0	1.000
Pittsburgh Maulers	3–1	.750
Michigan Panthers	2–2	.500
Houston Gamblers	1–1	.500
New Orleans Breakers	1–1	.500
New Jersey Generals	2–3	.400
Birmingham Stallions	0–3	.000
