= United States Football League (2022–2023) =

Professional American football league

- Most recent season or competition: 2023 USFL season
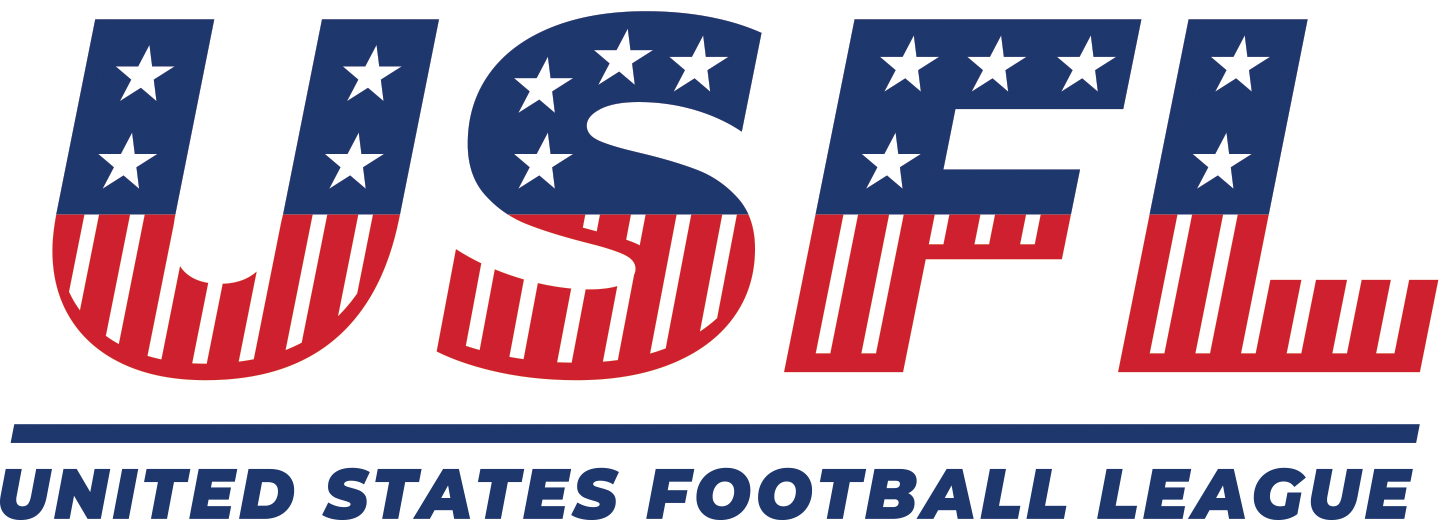
- Classification: Spring football league
- Sport: American football
- Founded: April 16, 2022
- Founder: Brian Woods
- First season: 2022
- Folded: December 31, 2023 (Merged into UFL); October 7, 2025 (USFL Conference dissolved); July 30, 2026 (Remaining USFL teams dissolved)
- Owner: National Spring Football League Enterprises Co, LLC: (Fox Corporation)
- President: Daryl Johnston
- No. of teams: 8
- Country: United States
- Headquarters: Birmingham, Alabama; U.S.
- Last champions: Birmingham Stallions (2nd title)
- Most titles: Birmingham Stallions (2 titles)
- Broadcasters: United States: Fox/FS1 NBC/USA; International: See list
- Streaming partners: United States: Fox Sports app Peacock
- Related competitions: Direct: XFL, UFL, TSL; Affiliated: IFL; Other: NFL, CFL, AAF, FXFL
- Website: www.theusfl.com

The United States Football League (USFL) was a professional American football minor league that played two seasons from 2022 to 2023.

The USFL was founded as a standalone league in 2022. In its two seasons of operation it operated eight teams; all with the brands of teams from a previous incarnation of the United States Football League that operated from 1983 to 1985. A majority of its teams did not play in the metropolitan areas of the cities after which they were named, with the entire league playing in Birmingham, Alabama during the inaugural 2022 season and each of the league's four host cities, mostly mid-sized markets and all east of the Mississippi River, sharing two teams in 2023.

The league was owned by National Spring Football League Enterprises Co, LLC, initially a joint venture between Fox Corporation's sports unit, Fox Sports in the United States and Brian Woods, with Fox Sports as a minority owner; Fox Corporation took over sole ownership in 2023. Although the league owned the trademarks of the old USFL, which operated for three seasons during the mid-1980s, the new USFL was not officially associated with that entity.

On September 28, 2023, the USFL announced its intention to merge with the XFL. On November 30, 2023, the leagues issued a statement that they "have completed the antitrust review process in connection with the proposed merger of the XFL and USFL and intend to play a combined season this spring kicking off on Saturday, March 30. We are now finalizing terms of the definitive agreement". On December 31, the name of the combined league was confirmed as the United Football League; a day later, the merged league announced that each component league would survive as a conference within the UFL. With the merger, all of the USFL's four surviving teams will play in their home markets, with one—the Houston Gamblers—moving into the city and assuming the identity of their XFL counterpart, the Houston Roughnecks.

On October 7, 2025, the USFL Conference was formally dissolved. Its last surviving teams, the Gamblers (who reverted to that brand as part of the dissolution) and Birmingham Stallions, were both discontinued on July 30, 2026.

== History ==
The groundwork for the USFL was originally laid in the summer of 2020, after plans to purchase the XFL, a league that Fox had carried during the winter 2020 season, out of bankruptcy were abandoned. RedBird Capital Partners, which would have financed the purchase, instead brought on Dany Garcia and Dwayne Johnson as partners to purchase that league. In October 2020, Fox struck an agreement with The Spring League to partially finance and broadcast that league's games.

On June 3, 2021, it was announced that the United States Football League "would be making a return" and would begin its inaugural season in April 2022. Fox was also announced as a minority owner in the league. This was the fifth attempt to launch a league using USFL naming, including prior attempts in 1945, a league proposed in the 1960s by eventual 1980s USFL founder David Dixon, the aforementioned league that existed between 1983 and 1985, and in 2010.

On October 12, 2021, Tad Snider, the executive director of the Birmingham-Jefferson Civic Center Authority, announced that the league was in serious discussions with the board of directors of the BJCC about the possibility of the USFL playing all of its games in Birmingham, Alabama. According to initial information, USFL players/staff would be housed in Birmingham during the season for an estimated economic impact of about $15 million (47,000 hotel nights), while the league would play the bubble season at Protective Stadium and Legion Field. The "bubble" setup may possibly continue in the league's second year, with as many as four teams playing in Birmingham and as many as four in their respective cities. The teams would then be expected to play in their own cities by Season 3.

The proposal included an eight-team 10-week season with two additional playoff rounds, from April 16 through July 3, 2022, with the broadcast proposal as follows: 25% each on Fox, NBC, FS1 and USA. Later on December 15, 2021, Fox and NBC had finalized their agreement. NBC announced that it would air nine games on NBC itself, eight on USA, and four on its streaming service Peacock.

On November 17, 2021, it was announced that The Spring League founder Brian Woods would serve as the league's president, as well as Daryl Johnston as EVP of football operations, Mike Pereira as head of officiating, and Edward Hartman as EVP of business operations.

On January 4, 2022, NBC Sports reported that a "player selection meeting" would be held on February 22 and 23 to set teams. Training camp was to begin on March 21.

On January 6, 2022, four of eight teams unveiled their head coaches and general managers on The Herd with Colin Cowherd,

- Former San Diego Chargers head coach Mike Riley was named head coach and general manager of the New Jersey Generals.
- Former Kansas City Chiefs head coach and Pittsburgh Steelers offensive coordinator Todd Haley was named head coach and general manager of the Tampa Bay Bandits.
- Former University of Houston, Texas A&M University, and University of Arizona head coach Kevin Sumlin was named head coach and general manager of the Houston Gamblers.
- Former Toronto Argonauts head coach Bart Andrus was named head coach and general manager of the Philadelphia Stars.

Two weeks later on January 20, 2022, two more head coaches were announced.

- Former Louisiana Tech head coach Skip Holtz was named head coach and general manager of the Birmingham Stallions.
- Former Pittsburgh Steelers running backs coach Kirby Wilson was named head coach and general manager of the Pittsburgh Maulers.

The final two head coaches were announced the following week on January 27, 2022.

- Former Houston Oilers/Tennessee Titans and St. Louis/Los Angeles Rams head coach Jeff Fisher was named head coach and general manager of the Michigan Panthers.
- Former University of Southern Mississippi and University of North Carolina head coach and Baylor University offensive coordinator/QB coach Larry Fedora was named head coach and general manager of the New Orleans Breakers.

=== 2022 season ===
On January 25, 2022, the city of Birmingham announced that the league headquarters would be in Birmingham, and all games of the 2022 USFL season would be played at Protective Stadium and Legion Field.

The first game was played on April 16, 2022, between the Birmingham Stallions and the New Jersey Generals at Protective Stadium. The game was broadcast by Fox and NBC, the first football game simulcast on over-the-air broadcast networks since the final week of the 2007 NFL regular season when a game between the New England Patriots and the New York Giants aired on CBS and NBC in addition to cable NFL Network. Tickets were released to the public at $10 per person; children aged 15 and under were admitted for free.

On February 16, 2022, the league announced that the 2022 Playoffs would be held in Canton, Ohio, at Tom Benson Hall of Fame Stadium instead of Birmingham due to conflicting scheduling with the 2022 World Games. The following day, on February 17, 2022, the league revealed uniforms for each team. The day after that the league announced the draft order for the 2022 USFL draft. The Birmingham Stallions became the first new USFL champions, after winning the league championship game against the Philadelphia Stars on July 3, 2022, 33–30. Upon the conclusion of its first season, the league became the first high-level spring football league to complete a season since the original iteration of the XFL in 2001, following the early shutdown of the AAF and COVID-19-induced hiatus of the second XFL in 2019 and 2020, respectively.

=== 2023 season ===
On June 27, 2022, Fox Sports confirmed to Sports Business Journal that the USFL would return for another season in 2023. There would be no expansion that year, and the league would continue to use a hub model, with "two to four" locations housing all eight teams. In October 13, the league signed an exclusive partnership agreement with HUB Football, which ended in June 2023, when HUB's owner Don Yee decided to pull the plug on the operation.

On November 15, 2022, the USFL and the City of Memphis, Tennessee announced that the Tampa Bay Bandits organization would effectively be relocated to Memphis as the Memphis Showboats, taking on the name and identity of the team from the original incarnation of the league. The team will play all of its home games at Simmons Bank Liberty Stadium, which will also serve as another "hub" site for the league to host multiple teams at in addition to Birmingham.

Johnston expressed disappointment for the viewership results of the 2023 season, acknowledging fan interest in Birmingham had diminished compared to 2022 and expressing anger that the league's television ratings were comparable to the XFL's and not the "far superior... not even close" results he had anticipated. In an interview later in the offseason, Johnston indicated that he believed the league was on track to surpass college football as a "better alternative."

=== USFL–XFL merger ===
On June 27, 2023, President of Football Operations Daryl Johnston confirmed in an interview that the league will return for the 2024 season. Discussions between USFL and XFL for a potential merger began in July. On September 19, 2023, Axios reported that discussions had advanced far enough that a merger was possible before each league's 2024 season. On September 28, 2023, the USFL and XFL announced their intent to merge. The merger would require regulatory approval, which was granted November 30. The merger was formally announced December 31.

The four teams that survived the merger continued to play in the USFL Conference of the UFL in 2024 and 2025. On July 23, 2025, unconfirmed reports indicated that the USFL Conference was being dismantled as all four of its teams were being slated for relocation to markets that were mostly not USFL markets. Those markets had been, other than Michigan, among the lowest-attended in the UFL in 2025, while Michigan, though it had made strong gains in 2025, faced exceptionally high venue costs. The UFL neither confirmed nor denied the reports, describing it as "unauthorized speculation." Michigan and Memphis would indeed not survive to play the 2026 UFL season. Birmingham and Houston would survive to play the 2026 season but would both be disbanded afterward, with Birmingham's closure blamed on dissatisfaction with a stadium oversized for incoming owner Mike Repole's vision, and Houston's due to the constant instability in team identity over the course of the team's existence. By then, the UFL had dismissed Daryl Johnston from his position and moved league operations back to the XFL's headquarters closer to Repole's home base in New York, under the XFL's legal identity. The shuttering of the two teams removed the last traces of the USFL.

== Teams ==
The league announced the 2022 season will be played "with a minimum of eight teams." In addition to obtaining the rights to the USFL name and logo, the new league has obtained the rights to the aforementioned former league's team names including the Los Angeles Express, Chicago Blitz, Tampa Bay Bandits, and Houston Gamblers. Additionally, the Generals rights are owned by The Spring League, another Woods entity. Since its original announcement, the USFL had purchased more trademarks including new team names like the Birmingham Stallions, Jacksonville Bulls, and Portland Breakers, and variations on the already existing trademarks.

Eight teams were announced on November 22, 2021, all featuring the names and colors of USFL teams that existed in 1984: Michigan Panthers, New Jersey Generals, Philadelphia Stars and Pittsburgh Maulers in the North Division and Birmingham Stallions, Houston Gamblers, New Orleans Breakers and Tampa Bay Bandits in the South Division. The Bandits were replaced in the 2023 season by the Memphis Showboats, in conjunction with the league agreement to play at Simmons Bank Liberty Stadium.

Team	Based City/State	Stadium	Capacity	First season	Head coach	Ultimate fate
North Division
Michigan Panthers	Detroit, Michigan	Ford Field	65,000†	2022	Mike Nolan	Joined UFL, Folded in 2025
New Jersey Generals	East Rutherford, New Jersey	Tom Benson Hall of Fame Stadium	23,000	2022	Mike Riley	Folded
Philadelphia Stars	Philadelphia, Pennsylvania	Ford Field	65,000†	2022	Bart Andrus	Folded
Pittsburgh Maulers	Pittsburgh, Pennsylvania	Tom Benson Hall of Fame Stadium	23,000	2022	Ray Horton	Folded
South Division
Birmingham Stallions	Birmingham, Alabama	Protective Stadium	47,100†	2022	Skip Holtz	Joined UFL, Folded in 2026
Houston Gamblers	Houston, Texas	Simmons Bank Liberty Stadium	58,325†	2022	Curtis Johnson	Joined UFL, Folded in 2026
Memphis Showboats	Memphis, Tennessee	Simmons Bank Liberty Stadium	58,325†	2023	Todd Haley	Joined UFL, Folded in 2025
New Orleans Breakers	New Orleans, Louisiana	Protective Stadium	47,100†	2022	John DeFilippo	Folded

Defunct franchises
Team	City/State	Only season	Head coach
Tampa Bay Bandits	Tampa, Florida	2022	Todd Haley

†Full stadium capacity. The large stadiums with multiple decks only open the lower bowl for XFL games, similar to the former AAF games and MLS matches played in large stadiums. The XFL has a target stadium size of 30,000 seats so that in the event of playoff games, the upper decks can be opened to increase capacity.

Locations of current & former teams for the 2024 USFL season, (South Division – red; North Division – blue; Former – black)

=== Timeline ===
" * " indicates Championship Season
Deactivated Teams in grey

- Tampa Bay was officially deactivated for the 2023 season, however it did not return before the league merged with the XFL and thus is considered to have folded.

== Connection to 1980s USFL ==
There is no legal connection between the new entity and the source of its name, the original United States Football League, which operated from 1983 to 1986 and was officially dissolved in 1990. No principals from the former USFL are involved in the current league's ownership; Brian Woods, who had previously launched the Fall Experimental Football League and The Spring League, was initially the primary owner of the new league. By October 2021, Woods had been demoted to a vice president role as Fox Sports set up a subsidiary, the National Spring Football League, to operate the league. Woods departed his positions with the USFL prior to the 2023 season. The Spring League, and later the NSFL, acquired most of the USFL's trademarks after the last attempt to revive them, the A-11 Football League, let them go dormant after its own failed launch in 2014. The new USFL did not inherit the old USFL's unpaid liabilities, nor its television contract; it instead holds a new contract with Fox Sports, which already owns both the rights to and an equity stake in The Spring League, and with NBC Sports.

According to Steve Ehrhart, former USFL executive director, he still owns the league rights and the "USFL still exists", while stating that the league officials still get monthly royalty checks. He also mentioned that he refused previous attempts to "buy" the league, "including the people who founded the first version of the XFL". Ehrhart would later explain that he was only "trying to protect the league legacy". By 2023, Ehrhart had given his full endorsement to the new league, stating "We have a lot of pride (and) we want them to succeed. They have the resources."

=== Lawsuit ===
On February 28, 2022, "The Real USFL, LLC," a group fronted by Larry Csonka (acting in his capacity as general manager of the original Jacksonville Bulls) and claiming to represent the interests of the owners of the former USFL franchises, filed suit to stop the current USFL from using the name or trademarks associated with the original league. In response, the league attorneys claimed "The new USFL registered its intellectual property rights in 2011".

On April 14 (two days before the scheduled start of the new USFL's regular season), federal judge John F. Walter of the Central District of California denied a preliminary injunction to bar the new USFL from using the original league's name and trademarks, remarking that while the plaintiffs were "likely to prevail" on their claim of trademark infringement, "any alleged harm" could be "easily compensated by monetary damages". The Real USFL, LLC withdrew its suit with prejudice on August 22, 2022.

== Rule changes unique to USFL ==
On March 23, 2022, the USFL announced an initial series of rule tweaks it would implement for its games. The league's rule variations and subsequent changes include the following:

=== Timing rules ===
- The play clock will be 35 seconds, with 25 seconds used for administrative stoppages and penalties.
- After the first three weeks of the 2022 season, certain game clock rules are utilized in an effort to keep game lengths under 180 minutes.
  - For the first three weeks of 2022, the game clock stopped after each incomplete pass, no matter which point of the game it occurred. For the rest of that season, the clock would continue to run after an incompletion (only stopping momentarily until the ball is ready to play), though only during the odd-numbered quarters (1st and 3rd).
  - Beginning in the 2023 season, the clock restarts after any incomplete pass during any point of the game outside of the last 5 minutes of the 2nd and 4th quarters.
  - Also beginning in 2023, the game clock restarts on the ready-for-play after a player on the offensive team in possession of the ball goes out of bounds; this rule does not apply within the two-minute warning in the 2nd and 4th quarters.
- After the two-minute warning in the 2nd and 4th quarters, the clock stops after a first down is gained or a penalty is assessed, restarting only upon the ensuing snap of the ball; this rule is similar to the rule the previous incarnation of the league used.
- Halftime was originally 15 minutes in length, but was reduced to 10 minutes in the 2023 season. Championship Game will still have a 30-minute intermission.

=== Kickoffs and punts ===
- As opposed to the 35-yard line in the NFL, all kickoffs take place from the kicking team's 20-yard line (originally the 25-yard line in 2022); this move increases opportunities for kick returns and reduces the risk of a touchback.
- No kicking team member may line up further back than one yard behind the ball, and must be stationary when the ball is kicked
- The team receiving the kickoff must have no fewer than 8 players and no more than 9 players within the setup zone between the kicking team's 30- and 40-yard lines (the 35- to 45-yard lines in 2022).
- If an untouched kick becomes dead, the ball belongs to the receiving team at that spot.
- A kicking team may not recover or touch its own kickoff beyond 20 yards from the spot of the kick.
- Any kickoff that goes out of bounds will be placed 30 yards from where it was kicked, meaning an out-of-bounds kickoff from the 20-yard line will be placed midfield at the 50-yard line.
- A trailing team can choose to execute either an onside kick under standard rules or, in lieu of a kickoff, attempt to gain 12 yards on a scrimmage play from its own 33-yard line; this "4th and 12" opportunity mirrors a similar rule used in the AAF in 2019 and Fan Controlled Football in 2021.
- On punts, gunners may not line up outside the numbers, nor can they be double-team blocked until the ball is kicked.

=== Standard play ===
- Two forward passes from behind the line of scrimmage are legal; this rule was originally introduced in the XFL in 2020. It will also mean that a pass batted back to the quarterback can be thrown again.
- An offensive lineman may advance downfield on a forward pass play in which the pass does not cross the line of scrimmage.
- A catch can be made with only one foot in-bounds (same as high school, the NCAA and the CFL).
- A ball fumbled forward from the field of play into the end zone and out of bounds will be returned to the spot of the fumble, with the fumbling team retaining possession.

=== Penalties and officiating ===
- Defensive pass interference will be penalized similar to college football (15-yard penalty or spot foul if within 15 yards of the line of scrimmage)
  - If it is determined the defensive player intentionally interfered with the receiver, the penalty will be a spot foul similar to the NFL rule.
  - As in the NFL, no fouls for pass interference or ineligible player downfield will be called if the ball fails to cross the line of scrimmage.
- The league's "Replay Command" center, based at Fox Sports' headquarters in Los Angeles, will have the authority to overrule incorrect personal foul calls, including but not limited to roughing the passer, hits on defenseless players, face-mask penalties, and horse-collar tackles. Replay Command will also determine if a pass interference act that occurs 15 yards beyond the line of scrimmage is obviously intentional.
- No chain crew will be used to determine first downs. Instead, the league uses proprietary technology, similar to the NFL's Next Gen Stats, that Fox Sports has affectionately called "Firsty." A microchip is included in each ball to help pinpoint its location and determine whether the offense has reached the line to gain. The ruling will be displayed on stadium scoreboards and television broadcasts, just as with the Hawk-Eye system used to call in-or-out balls in tennis. Though the USFL indicates that the system ensures "first down measurements that are more accurate than ever," Profootballtalk.com noted that the technology would not be more accurate than the traditional chain crew, because the technology has a margin of error of approximately the full length of the football.

=== Replay challenges ===
- Each coach will be allowed one replay challenge per game, and will signal their intent to challenge by throwing a red flag.
- If the challenge is not in the favor of the coach who called it, his team will lose a timeout; if successful, he will keep the challenge and receive an additional challenge.
- All challenges and replay reviews will be conducted by USFL Replay Command.
- As in the NFL, replay challenges are automatic in the last two minutes of either half and the whole overtime, as well as any scoring plays and turnovers.

=== Points after touchdown ===
- Teams will have three scrimmage-play options to attempt a point(s) after touchdown:
  - A single-point place kick or drop kick snapped from the 15-yard line (same as the NFL).
  - Two-point conversion from the three-yard line (same as the NCAA).
  - Three-point conversion from the 10-yard line, which the XFL used in both 2001 and 2020 (though neither XFL version allowed a kick-for-PAT option).
  - After scoring its touchdown, a team must indicate whether it will go for 1, 2, or 3 points.
    - Prior to Week 5 of the first season, the scoring team's extra point decision could not be changed after a penalty or a timeout. At the request of Michigan Panthers coach Jeff Fisher (who was denied an option change in a Week 4 contest), the rule was changed so that an offensive team can use a timeout to change its extra point option, provided it has not already snapped the ball or committed a pre-snap penalty (mirroring the NFL's extra-point rule). If the defense commits a foul before the snap, the scoring team will be allowed to change its option (without losing a timeout), with penalty yardage marked off from the new option spot.
- In any variation of the extra-point attempt, a defense can return a fumble, interception, or blocked kick, and will be awarded two points should it reach its opponent's end zone.

=== Overtime ===
Games that are tied after regulation will be resolved with an overtime session that combines elements of college football's overtime system with penalty shootouts used in soccer and ice hockey.

- A coin toss (called by the visiting team) will determine which team will go on offense or defense first.
- Since 2023, the USFL Command Center determines which end zone will be used in the overtime (both offenses will attack the same end zone, just as soccer shootouts are attempted at the same goal); the coin toss determined this choice in the 2022 season.
- Teams will attempt three alternating two-point attempts from the two-yard line.
- Whichever team has the most points after the three tries, or after one team gains an insurmountable lead, will be the winner.
- If the teams are still tied after three attempts, teams play multiple rounds until one team scores, which wins it.
- If an offensive team turns the ball over to the defense, the ball is automatically dead and the defense cannot return the ball to their opponent's end zone.
- A team can call one timeout per try.

== Players ==
For the inaugural season, each team originally had a 38-man active roster and a 7-man practice squad. However, the league decided midway through the 2022 season to expand rosters to a 40-man active game day roster, along with a 10-man practice squad. The roster sizes stayed the same for 2023, and were supposed to increase to 42 active and 8 inactive for 2024.

As of September 2023, 320 USFL players earned invitations to workout for NFL teams, with more than 100 NFL contracts signed and more than 40 USFL players started the season either on active NFL rosters or practice squads, including 2022 season MVP KaVontae Turpin, who signed with Dallas Cowboys and finished the 2022 NFL season as a Pro Bowler.

=== Compensation ===
USFL players and staff are able to receive a college degree "tuition-free and debt-free", through a partnership with for-profit universities Strategic Education's Capella University and Strayer University. They will be able to take classes online (Capella) or in-person (Strayer), giving them the flexibility to pursue associate, bachelor's or master's degrees in business, healthcare, IT and education.

For the 2022 season, player pay structure was $45,000 for Active Roster players, $15,000 for Practice Squad Players, and $600 weekly during training camp. Players also received win bonuses of $850 per win and $10,000 for winning the championship. Players were required to pay their own rent, but the league offered a reduced hotel price at a cost of $75 per room per day, with an option for two players to share a room.

On December 15, 2022, USFL player representatives (United Football Players Association and United Steelworkers) and the league parent company FOX Sports tentatively agreed on a new three-year collective bargaining agreement starting at the 2023 season, six months after the league players voted to unionize. The proposed agreement increases minimum salaries and provides a stronger benefits package than they previously received, and slightly higher than most XFL salaries. USFL players' minimum salaries will be $5,350 per week, up from the current $4,500 per week payout ($2,500 for inactive players) and $150 a week toward 401K contributions, while weekly performance bonuses will be cancelled. During training camp, all USFL players will get $850 a week. The new deal also include a $400 per week housing stipend. For the first year of the CBA, the roster size will stay at 50 (40 active/10 inactive), while from the second year going forward the makeup changes to 42 active and 8 inactive. The proposed CBA includes an annual opt-out option. The agreement was approved by the union members on January 9, 2023.

=== USFL draft ===
==== 2022 USFL draft ====
The USFL inaugural draft, also known as the 2022 USFL player selection meeting, was the player selection process to fill the rosters of the eight teams for the 2022 USFL season. The draft was held on February 22–23, 2022, with the results of the 280 players selected released through the USFL's social media channels.

==== 2023 USFL draft ====
The 2023 USFL draft, also known as the 2023 USFL college draft, was the second annual meeting of USFL franchises to select newly eligible players. The draft consisted of 2023 draft eligible players and 80 players were drafted.

== Records ==
All-time USFL leaders
Leader	Team	Player	Record	Years in USFL
Passing yards	Philadelphia Stars	Case Cookus	3,629 passing yards	2022–2023
Passing touchdowns	Philadelphia Stars	Case Cookus	27 passing touchdowns	2022–2023
Rushing yards	New Jersey Generals	Darius Victor	1,131 rushing yards	2022–2023
Rushing touchdowns	Houston Gamblers	Mark Thompson	16 rushing touchdowns	2022–2023
Receiving yards	New Orleans Breakers	Jonathan Adams	883 receiving yards	2022–2023
Receiving touchdowns	New Orleans Breakers	Johnnie Dixon	9 receiving touchdowns	2022–2023
Receptions	New Orleans Breakers	Jonathan Adams	71 receptions	2022–2023
Tackles	Michigan Panthers	Frank Ginda	194 tackles	2022–2023
Sacks	Philadelphia Stars	Adam Rodriguez	15.0 sacks	2022–2023
Interceptions	Philadelphia Stars	Channing Stribling	8 interceptions	2022–2023
Coaching wins	Birmingham Stallions	Skip Holtz	17 wins	2022–2023

== League finances ==
Fox Sports owns the league and has reportedly committed $150–$200 million over three years to its operations, with plans to attract an additional $250 million from investors. For the 2022 regular season, tickets would be sold at $10 per person, with children aged 15 and under free, for the two semi-final games tickets are sold at $15 per person and children under 15 at $5 those prices are increased by $5 for the championship game.

The league draws revenue of less than $10 million, making it ineligible to seek P visas for players from outside the United States; Liam Dobson, a Canadian offensive lineman, was disqualified from playing in the USFL because of the league's lack of revenue.

=== Gambling ===
On March 3, 2022, the league announced fifteen states have approved legal, regulated betting on USFL games.

== Broadcasting ==
In December 2021 the Fox Sports-controlled league announced they signed a three-year rights deal agreement with NBC, which involves a rights fee (the agreed-upon fee was never published). It was the first rights fee deal for alternative football league in the 21st century, after both the Alliance of American Football and XFL had a rights deal agreement with major networks, but none got paid for it (the only exceptions were two games involving the Hartford Colonials from the United Football League, which were sold to New England Sports Network in 2010).

In an interview Fox Corporation CEO Lachlan Murdoch mentioned that the NFL "has been supporting the launch of the USFL".

=== 2022 season ===
For the 2022 season NBC and Fox Sports were the league's two official broadcast partners, with Fox carrying 22 games and NBC carrying 21. Telecasts for the 2022 season were produced by Fox Sports and NBC Sports. Fox broadcast 13 regular season games (1 simulcast with NBC), 1 semi-final, and the championship game. NBC broadcast 8 regular season games (1 simulcast with Fox) and 1 semi-final. Peacock broadcast 4 games exclusively and simulcast all NBC games (including the opening game simulcast with Fox and NBC). Other games air on Cable networks USA Network (9 games) and FS1 (7 games).

The opening game was broadcast on April 16, 2022, at 7:30 PM Eastern time on both Fox and NBC. Fox produced the game and NBC produced all studio coverage. It was the first football game to be simulcast across two major American broadcast networks since the 2007 New England Patriots–New York Giants game.

Fox brought back its lead XFL broadcast team from 2020, Curt Menefee and Joel Klatt, for USFL coverage. Kevin Kugler and Mark Sanchez serve as the second broadcast team. Brock Huard reports from the sidelines during selected games. The NBC crew features Jac Collinsworth and Paul Burmeister handling play-by-play duties alongside analysts Jason Garrett, Michael Robinson and Cameron Jordan. Zora Stephenson and Corey Robinson are sideline reporters and Sara Perlman hosts halftime and post-game coverage.

==== United by Football ====
During the 2022 season, Fox also aired a 13-part documentary series called "United by Football: A Season in the USFL" which produced by the league, NFL Films and Fox Sports. The series followed the USFL players and coaches "behind-the-scenes" during their 2022 journey, starting with the inaugural USFL Player Draft in Birmingham, and conclude with the USFL Championship Game. The series averaged 720,000 viewers per episode.

The show caused controversy before the first week, as a video clip, posted on social media, of Pittsburgh Maulers head coach Kirby Wilson releasing running back De'Veon Smith due to violating team protocol after asking to have pizza for lunch instead of the chicken salad.

=== 2023 season ===
Telecasts for the 2023 season aired on Fox, FS1, NBC and USA Network. Fox aired 17 regular season games and 1 semi-final, NBC broadcast 9 regular season games, 1 semi-final and the Championship game, and FS1 and USA Network broadcast 7 games each. Unlike the 2022 season, in order to increase the leagues exposure, Peacock did not air exclusive games. Instead, Peacock simply simulcast all NBC and USA Network games. An emphasis was also made on having high-profile events serve as lead-ins to the league, with some games following NASCAR and Major League Baseball broadcasts on Fox or the Kentucky Derby on NBC.

Curt Menefee and Joel Klatt returned as Fox's lead commentary team for USFL coverage. Kevin Kugler and Mark Sanchez served as the second broadcast team. Brock Huard reported from the sidelines during selected games. Devin Gardner also appeared on select games.

The NBC crew featured Jac Collinsworth and Paul Burmeister handling play-by-play duties alongside analysts Jason Garrett, Michael Robinson and Cameron Jordan. Zora Stephenson, Corey Robinson, Lewis Johnson, and Caroline Pineda were the sideline reporters. Colt McCoy, Kyle Rudolph and Anthony Herron were the additional analysts for selected games.

=== International broadcasters ===
For the 2023 season NBC Sports, FOX Sports partnered with DAZN to broadcast live international coverage of the 14-game schedule, including the playoffs and the championship game (excludes coverage in the U.S. and the 14 countries with separate broadcast deal). In the United Kingdom and Ireland it was broadcast through Sky Sports, in Australia by FOX Sports Australia, in Denmark, Estonia, Finland, Iceland, Latvia, Lithuania, Norway, Poland, and Sweden by Viaplay in Hungary by Network 4 and in the Philippines by Elite.

== Champions ==
USFL Champions
Date	Winning Team	Score	Losing Team	Score	Stadium	Location	Attendance	MVP	Network	Viewership
July 3, 2022	Birmingham Stallions	33	Philadelphia Stars	30	Tom Benson Hall of Fame Stadium	Canton, Ohio	20,000	Victor Bolden Jr.	Fox	1.52 million
July 1, 2023	Birmingham Stallions	28	Pittsburgh Maulers	12	Tom Benson Hall of Fame Stadium	Canton, Ohio	N/A	Deon Cain	NBC	1.16 million
