= 2022 New Orleans Breakers season =

American professional football season

- General manager: Larry Fedora
- Head coach: Larry Fedora
- Home stadium: None

Results
- Record: 6–4
- League place: 2nd in South Division
- Playoffs: Lost Division Finals (at Stallions) 17–31

The 2022 New Orleans Breakers season was the first season for the New Orleans Breakers as a professional American football franchise. They play as charter members of the United States Football League, one of eight teams to compete in the league for the 2022 season. The Breakers technically play as a traveling team (since the entirety of the regular season will be played at Protective Stadium and Legion Field in Birmingham, Alabama) and are led by head coach Larry Fedora.

== Offseason ==
=== Draft ===
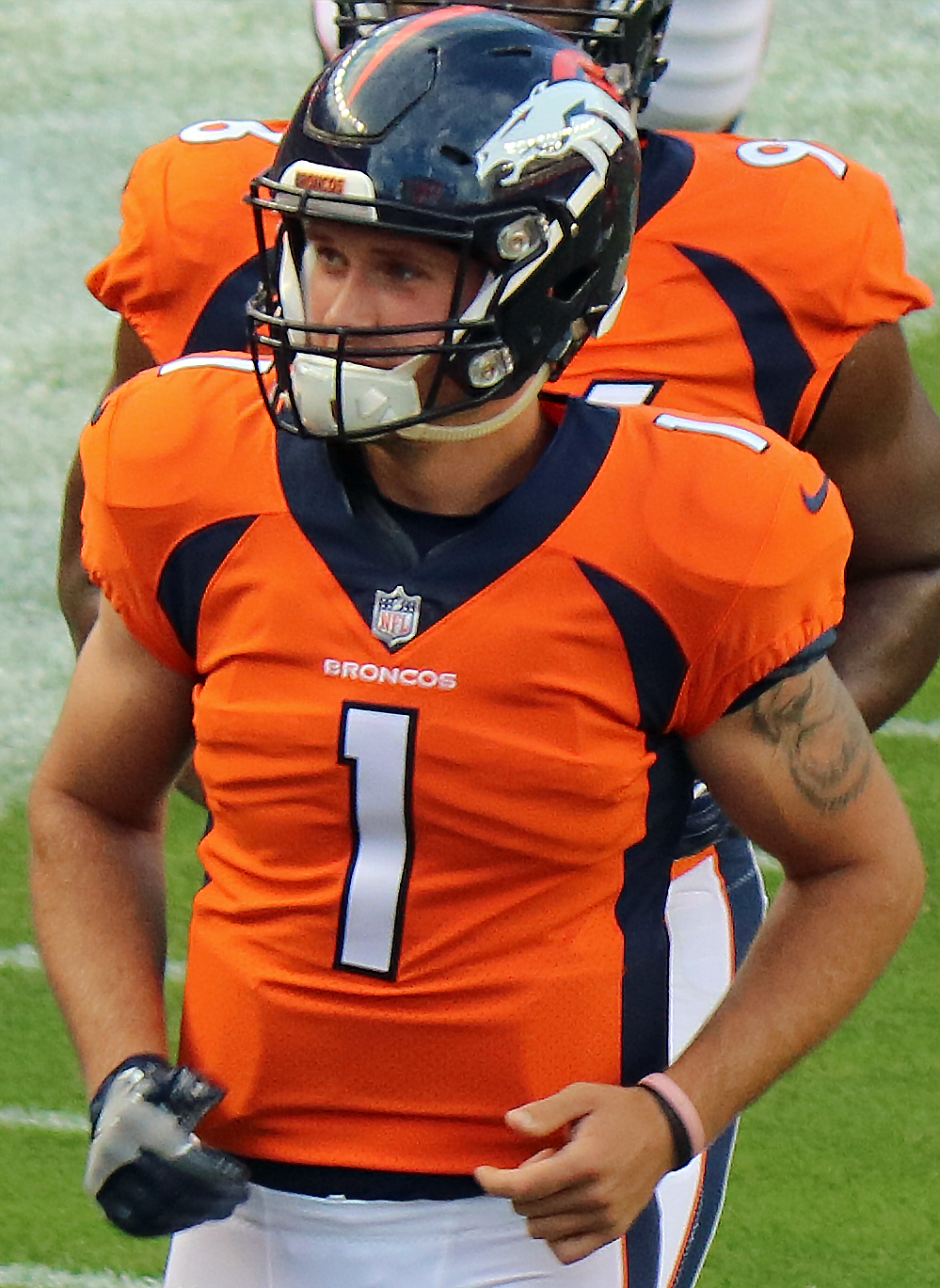
Kyle Sloter was chosen in the first round. He played for 6 NFL teams and was on the official roster for 2.

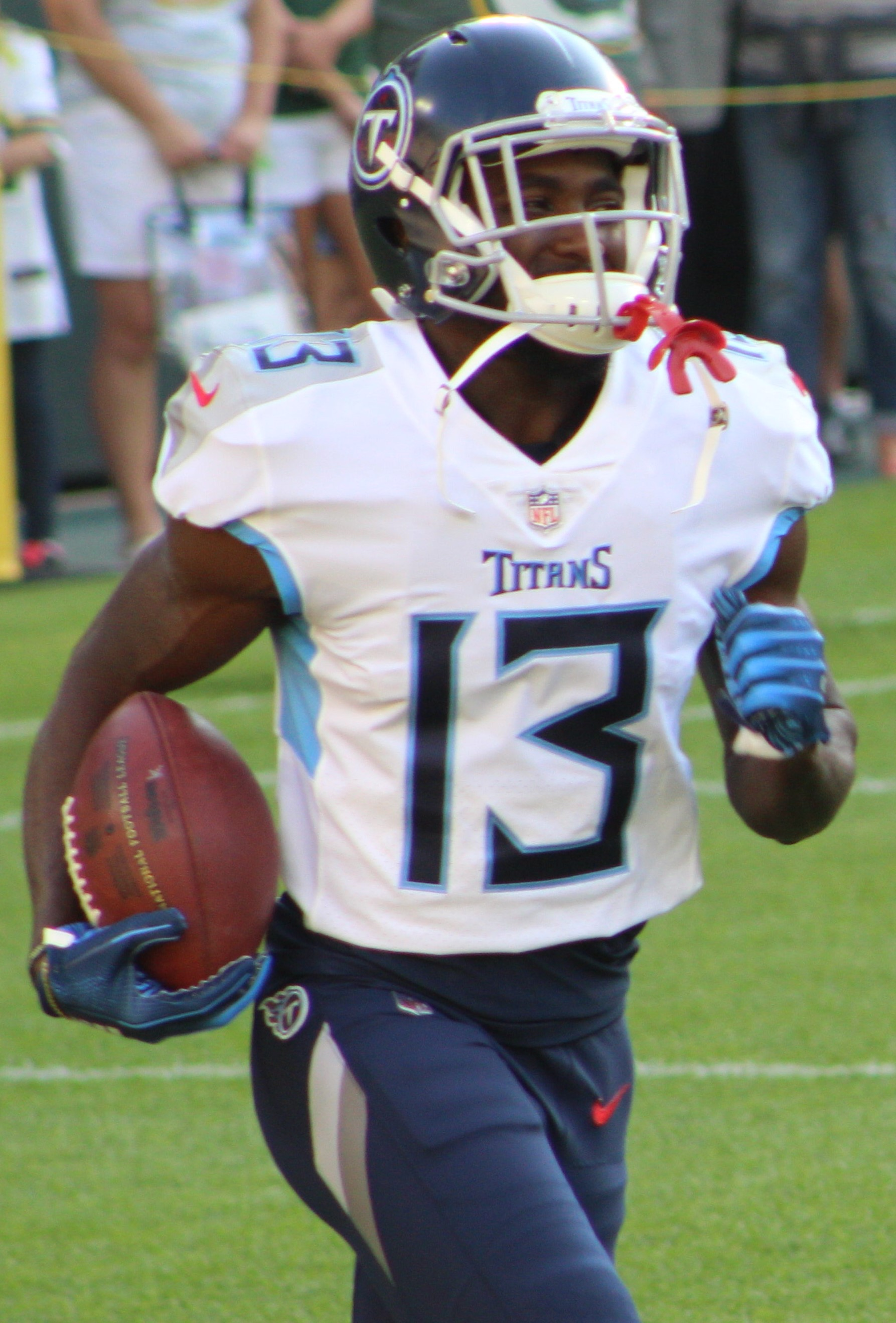
Taywan Taylor was selected in the 16th round. Taylor was selected in the third round of the 2017 NFL draft by the Tennessee Titans before going to the Browns in 2019.

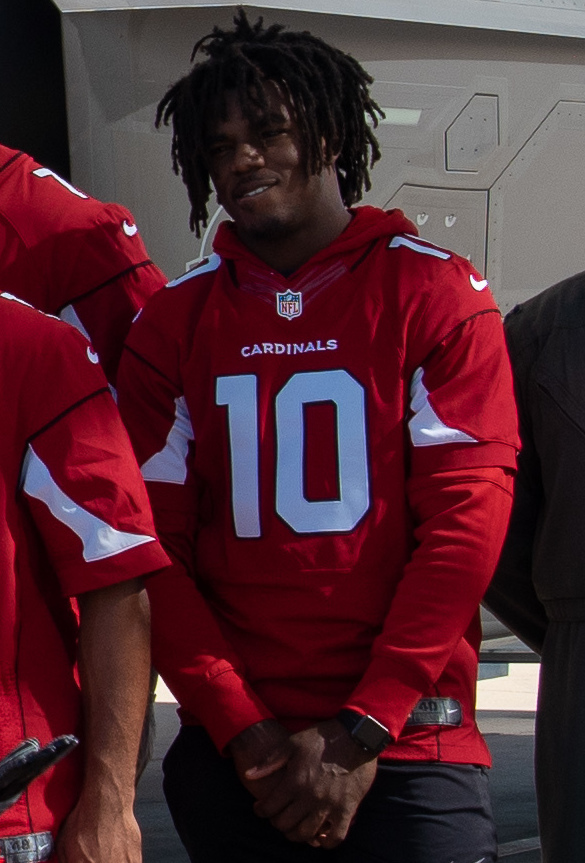
Chad Williams was selected in the 17th round. Williams was selected in the third round of the 2017 NFL draft by the Arizona Cardinals before playing for the Colts in 2019.

The 2022 USFL draft was conducted entirely on social media. Draft selections by the Michigan Panthers were announced on their social media. The Breakers selected NFL journeyman Kyle Sloter in the first round.

New Orleans Breakers
Round	Selection	Player	Position	College	Notes
1	8	Kyle Sloter	QB	Northern Colorado	
2	1	Davin Bellamy	DE	Georgia	
3	8	Anree Saint-Amour	DE	Georgia Tech	
4	1	James Folston Jr.	DE	Pittsburgh	
4	9	Nigel Chavis	DE	Norfolk State	Compensatory pick.
5	4	Paul Adams	OT	Missouri	
6	5	Donnell Greene	OT	Minnesota	
7	4	Marquis Lucas	OT	West Virginia	
8	5	Adonis Alexander	CB	Virginia Tech	
9	4	Derrick Jones	CB	Ole Miss	
10	5	Manny Patterson	CB	Maine	
11	4	Ja'Len Embry	CB	Northern Illinois	
11	9	Isiah Brown	CB	FIU	Compensatory selection.
12	1	Zach Smith	QB	Tulsa	
13	3	Shawn Poindexter	WR	Arizona	
14	6	Johnnie Dixon	WR	Ohio State	
15	3	Jonathan Adams	WR	Arkansas State	
16	6	Taywan Taylor	WR	Western Kentucky	
17	3	Chad Williams	WR	Grambling	
18	6	Dartez Jacobs	S	Georgia State	
20	7	Jared Thomas	C	Northwestern	
21	2	Jerod Fernandez	ILB	North Carolina State	
22	1	Steven Rowzee	OG	Troy	
23	8	Liam Dobson	OG	Texas State	
23	9	Jalen Allen	OG	Charlotte	Compensatory selection.
24	8	Shakir Soto	DT	Pitt	
25	1	Kamilo Tongamoa	DT	Iowa State	
26	8	Connor Christian	DT	Jacksonville State	
26	9	Chris Okoye	DT	Ferris State	Compensatory selection.
27	5	Larry Rose III	RB	New Mexico State	
28	4	Jordan Ellis	RB	Virginia	
29	4	Diondre Wallace	OLB	Towson State	
30	6	Vontae Diggs	OLB	UConn	
32	6	Austin MacGinnis	K	Kentucky	
34	2	Salvatore Cannella	TE	Auburn	

=== Supplemental draft ===
2022 New Orleans Breakers Supplemental Draft
Round	Selection	Player	Position	College	Notes
1	1	Justin Johnson	TE	Mississippi State	
2	8	Keith Washington II	CB	West Virginia	
3	5	Tyrone Logan Jr.	RB	North Carolina	
4	4	Shareef Miller	DE	Penn State	
5	6	Aashari Croswell	S	Arizona State	
6	3	EJ Bibbs	TE	Iowa State	
7	2	Turner Bernard	CB	San Diego	
8	7	Jarey Elder	WR	West Chester	
9	5	Matt White	P/K	Monmouth	
10	4	Toree Boyd	OL	Howard	

== Final roster ==
2022 New Orleans Breakers roster
Quarterbacks (QB): 18 Shea Patterson; 10 Kyle Sloter; Running backs (RB): 31 Jordan Ellis; 21 Ezra Gray; 6 Anthony Jones; Wide receivers (WR): 9 Jonathan Adams; 2 Johnnie Dixon; 5 Lee Morris, Jr.; 13 Taywan Taylor; Tight ends (TE): 80 Sal Cannella; 81 Justin Johnson	Offensive linemen (OL): 79 Kai Absheer T; 77 Paul Adams T; 53 Tim Coleman T; 69 Jack Kramer G/C; 74 Marquis Lucas T; 67 Steven Rowzee G; 65 Jared Thomas C; Defensive linemen (DL): 56 Davin Bellamy DE; 98 Connor Christian DT; 70 Reggie Howard DT; 58 Shareef Miller DE; 94 Anree Saint-Amour DE; 92 Shakir Soto DT; 99 Kamilo Tongamoa DT	Linebackers (LB): 8 Nigel Chavis; 20 Vontae Diggs; 45 Jerod Fernandez; 25 Christian Sam; Defensive backs (DB): 3 Adonis Alexander CB; 35 Ike Brown CB; 14 Nevelle Clarke CB; 33 Greg Eisworth S; 23 Jarey Elder S; 15 Derrick Jones CB; 4 Manny Patterson CB; 22 Mike Stevens CB; Special teams (ST): 60 Turner Bernard LS; 17 Taylor Bertolet K; 19 Matt White P	Practice squad: 85 E. J. Bibbs TE; 54 Toree Boyd C; 59 Djimon Brooks DT; 16 Aashari Crosswell S; 90 T. J. Johnson DE; 7 Marquis McClain WR; 1 Shawn Poindexter WR; 12 Larry Rose RB; 11 Zach Smith QB; 28 Keith Washington II CB; Reserve: -- Donnell Greene T (DNR); 18 Dartez Jacobs S (IR); 7 Austin MacGinnis K (DNR); -- Brandon Rolfe G Retired; -- Treyvion Shannon T (DNR); Rookies in italics 40 active, 5 reserve, 10 practice squad

== Staff ==
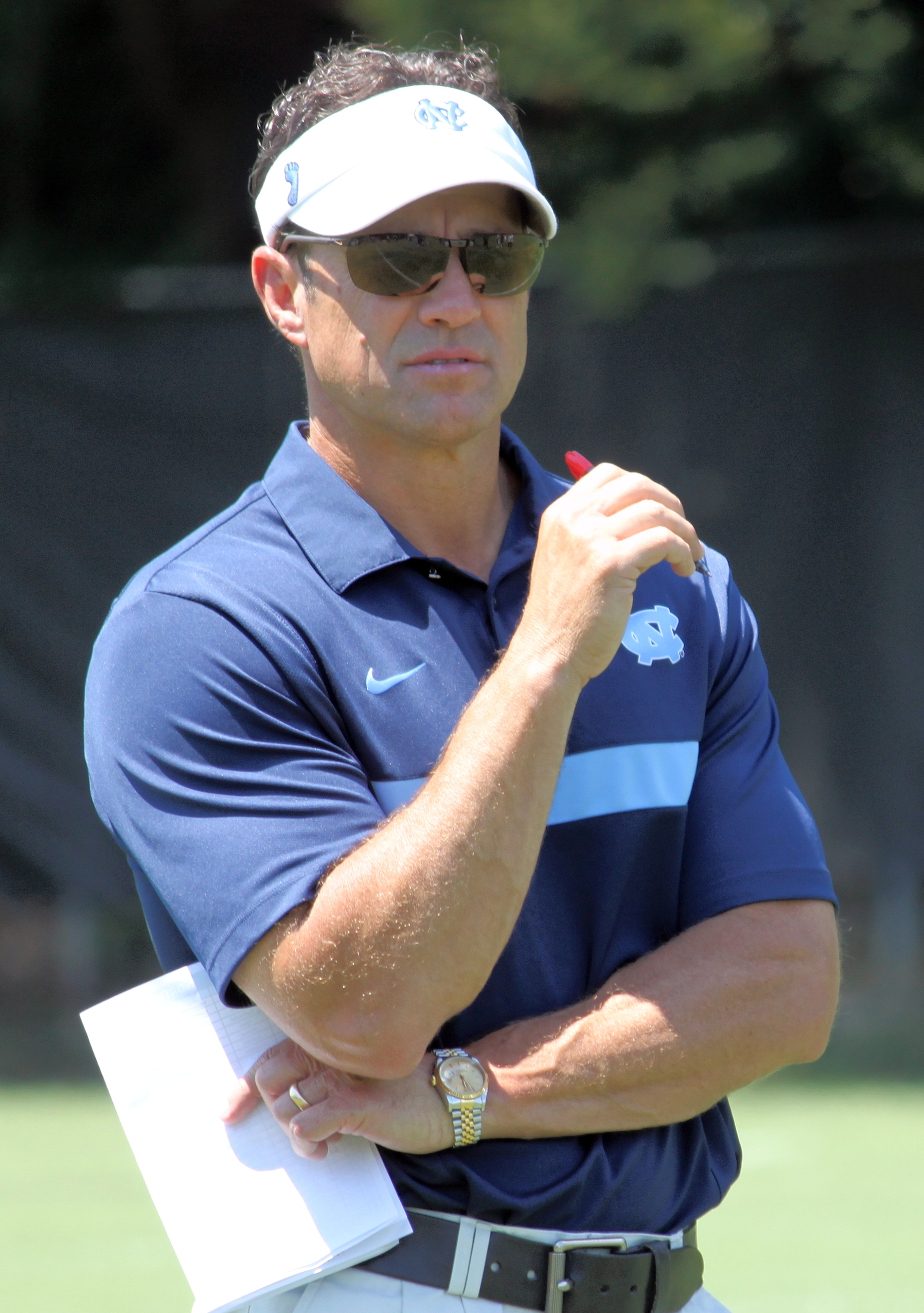
Larry Fedora was chosen as the Breakers head coach. As a Southern Miss and North Carolina head coach, he led both teams to conference titles.

2022 New Orleans Breakers staff
Front office: General manager – Larry Fedora; Head coaches: Head coach – Larry Fedora; Offensive coaches: Offensive coordinator/Quarterbacks – Noel Mazzone; Wide receivers – Pat Washington; Tight ends/Special teams coordinator – Matt Butterfield; Offensive line – Jim Turner	Defensive coaches: Defensive coordinator/Linebackers – Jon Tenuta; Defensive line – Paul Spicer; Assistant defensive line – Greg Patrick; Secondary – Nathan Burton

== Schedule ==
=== Regular season ===
The Breakers' 2022 schedule was announced on March 7. They opened the season against the Philadelphia Stars.

Week	Date	Time (ET)	Opponent	Result	Record	TV	Recap
1	April 17	5:00 p.m.	Philadelphia Stars*	**W** 23–17	1–0	USA	Recap
2	April 24	3:00 p.m.	**Tampa Bay Bandits**	**W** 34–3	2–0	NBC/Peacock	Recap
3	April 30	8:00 p.m.	**Birmingham Stallions***	**L** 13–22	2–1	Fox	Recap
4	May 8	3:00 p.m.	**Houston Gamblers***	**W** 23–16	3–1	NBC/Peacock	Recap
5	May 14	3:00 p.m.	New Jersey Generals	**L** 17–27	3–2	Fox	Recap
6	May 22	12:00 p.m.	Pittsburgh Maulers*	**W** 26–16	4–2	FS1	Recap
7	May 28	9:00 p.m.	Michigan Panthers	**W** 31–27 (OT)	5–2	FS1	Recap
8	June 4	3:00 p.m.	**Birmingham Stallions**	**L** 9–10	5–3	Fox	Recap
9	June 12	4:00 p.m.	**Tampa Bay Bandits***	**W** 17–6	6–3	Fox	Recap
10	June 19	8:30 p.m.	**Houston Gamblers**	**L** 3–20	6–4	FS1	Recap

Note: Intra-division opponents are in bold text. * mean that they host the game, since all eight teams play at the same stadium

=== Game summaries ===
==== Week 1: vs. Philadelphia Stars ====
Week 1: Philadelphia Stars at New Orleans Breakers – Game summary

Quarter	1	2	3	4	Total
Stars	0	7	10	0	**17**
**Breakers**	7	2	8	6	**23**

at Protective Stadium, Birmingham, Alabama

- Date: April 17
- Game time: 5:00 p.m. (delayed)
- Referee: Larry Smith
- TV announcers (USA): Paul Burmeister, Michael Robinson, Lewis Johnson

Game information

**First quarter**

- NO – Vontae Diggs 37-yard interception return (Austin MacGinnis kick), 5:36. New Orleans 7–0.

**Second quarter**

- NO – Chad Williams blocked punt out of endzone, safety, 8:54. New Orleans 9–0.
- PHI – Bug Howard 10-yard pass from Bryan Scott (Matt Mengal kick), 0:52. New Orleans 9–7. **Drive: 11 plays, 79 yards, 4:03.**

**Third quarter**

- PHI – Matt Mengal kick 38-yard field goal, 11:57. Philadelphia 10–9. **Drive: 4 plays, -4 yards, 1:55.**
- NO – T. J. Logan 12-yard rush (Kyle Sloter pass), 5:11. New Orleans 17–10. **Drive: 6 plays, 58 yards, 2:30.**
- PHI – Darnell Holland 42-yard rush (Matt Mengal kick), 4:27. Tied 17–17. **Drive: 2 plays, 50 yards, 0:47.**

**Fourth quarter**

- NO – Jordan Ellis 2-yard rush (Austin MacGinnis kick no good), 15:00. New Orleans 23–17. **Drive: 9 plays, 63 yards, 4:20.**

**Top passers**

- NO – Kyle Sloter – 17/27, 150 yards, INT
- PHI – Bryan Scott – 25/36, 202 yards, TD, INT

**Top rushers**

- NO – Jordan Ellis – 18 rushes, 89 yards, TD
- PHI – Darnell Holland – 9 rushes, 52 yards, TD

**Top receivers**

- NO – Sal Cannella – 6 receptions, 58 yards
- PHI – Chris Rowland – 7 receptions, 74 yards

The Breakers started their season against the Philadelphia Stars. The Breakers put the first points on the board with a pick-6 by Vontae Diggs, putting the Breakers up 7-0. In the second quarter, the Breakers blocked a punt in the endzone for a safety, putting the Breakers up 9-0. In the waning minutes of the second quarter, the Stars drove 94 yards downfield, where the Breakers defense committed 20 penalty yards, and scored, putting the Breakers at a 9-7 lead.

In the third quarter, a Kyle Sloter pass was intercepted by the Stars, which set them up with a 38 yard field goal to put the Breakers down 9-10. Halfway into the third, the Breakers took the lead again with a 58 yard touchdown drive and a 2 point conversion, putting the Breakers up 17-10. The Stars responded in the fourth with a 2 play 50 yard drive which included a 42 yard rush, to tie it up 17-17. The Breakers responded on their next drive with a 9 play 63 yard drive, putting the Breakers up 23-17, which would be the final score as both teams traded possessions for the rest of the fourth.

==== Week 2: at Tampa Bay Bandits ====
Week 2: New Orleans Breakers at Tampa Bay Bandits – Game summary

Quarter	1	2	3	4	Total
**Breakers**	14	7	0	13	**34**
Bandits	0	3	0	0	**3**

at Protective Stadium, Birmingham, Alabama

- Date: April 24
- Game time: 3:00 p.m.
- Referee: Alex Moore
- TV announcers (NBC/Peacock): Jac Collinsworth, Jason Garrett, Lewis Johnson

Game information
**First quarter**
- NO – Kyle Sloter 1-yard rush (Austin MacGinnis kick no good), 7:32. Breakers 6–0. **13 plays, 79 yards, 5:44.**
- NO – T. J. Logan 5-yard rush (Kyle Sloter pass good), 0:15. Breakers 14–0. **12 plays, 70 yards, 5:42.**

**Second quarter**

- TB – Tyler Rausa 21-yard field goal, 5:54. Breakers 14–3. **11 plays, 69 yards, 6:20.**
- NO – Shawn Poindexter 18-yard pass from Kyle Sloter (Austin MacGinnis kick good), 2:28. Breakers 21–3. **7 plays, 56 yards, 3:23.**

**Fourth quarter**

- NO – Austin MacGinnis 22-yard field goal, 14:49. Breakers 24–3. **10 plays, 55 yards, 2:54.**
- NO – Johnnie Dixon 4-yard pass from Kyle Sloter (Austin MacGinnis kick good), 11:33. Breakers 31–3. **5 plays, 31 yards, 1:50.**
- NO – Austin MacGinnis 30-yard field goal, 1:11. Breakers 34–3. **4 plays, 7 yards, 1:44.**

The Breakers faced division rival Tampa Bay Bandits. The Breakers struck first on a 79 yard touchdown drive, but the extra point was missed, putting the Breakers at 6-0. After a Bandits punt, the Breakers marched 65 yards downfield to score another touchdown, converting a 2-point conversion to bring the Breakers to 14-0. The Bandits responded in the second quarter with a 69 yard field goal drive capped off by a 21-yard field goal by Tyler Rausa to bring the Breakers at 14-3. The Breakers responded with a 56 yard touchdown drive that included a 29-yard one-handed catch by wide receiver Johnathan Adams, deemed the catch of the season, to put the Breakers up 21-3.

In the second half, the Bandits turned it over on downs while the Breakers were unable to score. In the fourth quarter, the Breakers stretched their lead to 24-3 after a 22 yard field goal. They triumphed more, scoring a touchdown off a Ta'amu interception, putting them at a commanding 31-3 margin. They then made a 30-yard field goal to put them at 34-3 with a little over a minute, which would be the final score.

==== Week 3: vs. Birmingham Stallions ====
Week 3: Birmingham Stallions at New Orleans Breakers – Game summary

Quarter	1	2	3	4	Total
**Stallions**	0	10	0	12	**22**
Breakers	0	6	7	0	**13**

at Protective Stadium, Birmingham, Alabama

- Date: April 30
- Game time: 8:00 p.m. EDT
- Referee: Larry Smith
- TV announcers (Fox): Curt Menefee, Joel Klatt, Brock Huard

Game information

**Second quarter**

- BIRM – Marlon Williams 47-yard catch from J'Mar Smith (Brandon Aubrey kick good), 8:23. Stallions 7–0. **Drive: 7 plays, 78 yards, 3:16.**
- NO – Johnnie Dixon 2-yard catch from Kyle Sloter (Austin MacGinnis kick no good), 1:12. Stallions 7–6. **Drive: 13 plays, 85 yards, 5:07.**
- BIRM – Brandon Aubrey 33-yard field goal, 0:07. Stallions 10–7. **Drive: 11 plays, 57 yards, 1:09.**

**Third quarter**

- NO – Johnnie Dixon 11-yard catch from Kyle Sloter (Austin MacGinnis kick good), 6:10. Stallions 10–6. **Drive: 17 plays, 77 yards, 8:50.**

**Fourth quarter**

- BIRM – Victor Bolden Jr. 19-yard catch from J'Mar Smith (Brandon Aubrey kick good), 7:56. Stallions 17–13. **Drive: 8 plays, 68 yards, 3:06.**
- BIRM – Kyle Sloter sacked in endzone, 7:43. Stallions 19–13.
- BIRM – Brandon Aubrey 32-yard field goal, 1:19. Stallions 22–13. **Drive: 4 plays, 0 yards, 1:23.**

**Top passers**

- BIRM – J'Mar Smith – 15/38, 197 yards, 2 TD, INT
- NO – Kyle Sloter – 26/47, 240 yards, 2 TD, INT

**Top rushers**

- BIRM – J'Mar Smith – 8 rushes, 59 yards
- NO – Jordan Ellis – 25 rushes, 90 yards

**Top receivers**

- BIRM – Victor Bolden Jr. – 6 receptions, 70 yards, TD
- NO – Johnnie Dixon – 2 receptions, 53 yards, TD

The 2-0 Breakers played against division rival, the 2–0 Birmingham Stallions. In what started off as a slow offensive performance for both sides, the Stallions got a 7-0 lead on a J'Mar Smith screen pass to Marlon Williams. Later into the 2nd quarter, the Breakers scored on a 10 yard pass from Kyle Sloter to Johnnie Dixon which made the Stallions lead trim down to 7-6. With 7 seconds left in the half, Brandon Aubrey made a 33-yard field goal to give Birmingham a 10-6 lead at the half.

Coming out of the half, the Breakers conducted an 8:50 17 play drive to regain the lead at 13-10 on an 11 yard pass from Sloter to Dixon. This would be the last time the Breakers would score all game. Birmingham would score 12 points in the final quarter of play. A touchdown from Smith to Victor Bolden Jr, a safety forced by Dondrea Tillman, and a Brandon Aubrey field goal. Birmingham would end up winning 22-13. The loss put the Breakers at 2nd in the South Division.

== Standings ==
South Division
#		W	L	PCT	GB	DIV	PF	PA	STK
1	(y) Birmingham Stallions	9	1	.900	–	5–1	234	169	W1
2	(x) New Orleans Breakers	6	4	.600	3	3–3	196	164	L1
3	(e) Tampa Bay Bandits	4	6	.400	5	2–4	162	195	L2
4	(e) Houston Gamblers	3	7	.300	6	2–4	196	208	W2
(x)–clinched playoff berth; (y)–clinched division; (e)–eliminated from playoff contention

=== Postseason ===
Round	Date	Time (ET)	Opponent	Result	Record	TV	Recap
Division Finals	June 25	8:00 p.m.	at Birmingham Stallions	L 17–31	0–1	NBC/Peacock	Recap
