= Kyle Sloter =

American football player (born 1994)

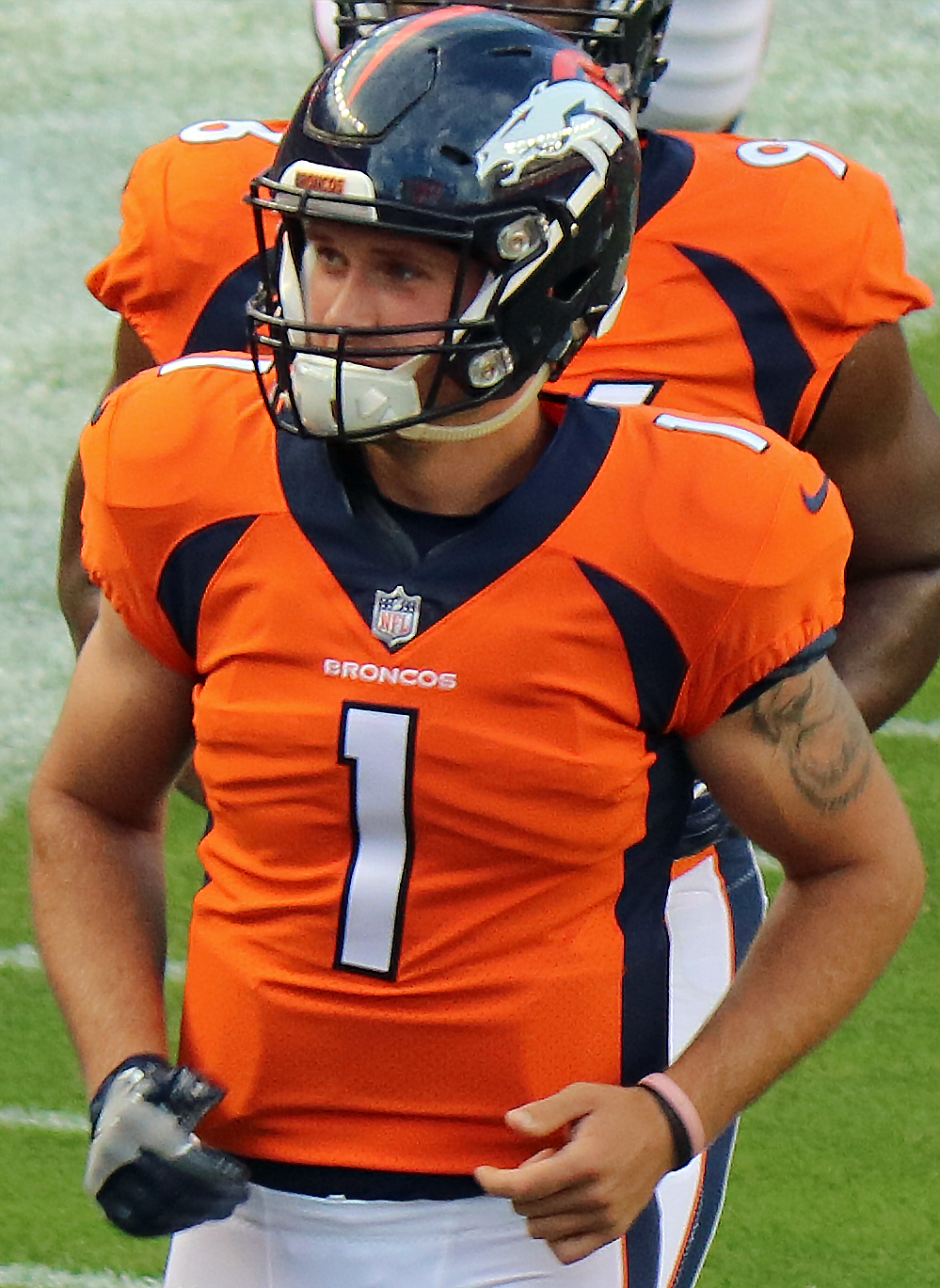
- Sloter with the Denver Broncos in 2017

No. 1
- Position: Quarterback

Personal information
- Born: February 7, 1994 (age 32); Atlanta, Georgia, U.S.
- Listed height: 6 ft 5 in (1.96 m)
- Listed weight: 218 lb (99 kg)

Career information
- High school: Mount Pisgah Christian School (Johns Creek, Georgia)
- College: Southern Miss (2013–2014); Northern Colorado (2015–2016)
- NFL draft: 2017: undrafted

Career history
- Denver Broncos (2017)*; Minnesota Vikings (2017–2018); Arizona Cardinals (2019)*; Detroit Lions (2019); Chicago Bears (2020)*; Las Vegas Raiders (2021)*; Minnesota Vikings (2021); New Orleans Breakers (2022); Jacksonville Jaguars (2022)*; Arlington Renegades (2023); Birmingham Stallions (2023)
- * Offseason or practice squad member only

Awards and highlights
- USFL champion (2023); All-USFL Team (2022)

Career USFL statistics
- Passing attempts: 291
- Passing completions: 168
- Completion percentage: 57.7
- TD–INT: 9–11
- Passing yards: 1,799
- QBR: 70.5
- Stats at Pro Football Reference

Kyle Joseph Sloter (born February 7, 1994) is an American former professional football quarterback. He played college football for the Southern Miss Golden Eagles before transferring to the Northern Colorado Bears. He signed as an undrafted free agent with the Denver Broncos of the National Football League (NFL) in 2017. He was also a member of the Minnesota Vikings, Arizona Cardinals, Detroit Lions, Chicago Bears, Las Vegas Raiders, and Jacksonville Jaguars. He also played for the New Orleans Breakers of the USFL and the Arlington Renegades of the XFL.

== Early life ==
Born in Atlanta, Georgia, Sloter attended Mount Pisgah Christian School, where he was a two-sport star. In football, he set nearly every record with 9,200 total yards, including roughly 6,000 passing yards and 3,000 rushing yards with 87 career touchdowns. He was a two-time first-team All-State selection, four times first-team All-District, All-Area, All-Region and All-Metro honoree. He also played basketball, helping his team win two Regional Championships and advance to the Final Four and earned All-State, All-Region, All-District and Team MVP honors. Sloter scored 2,100 career points, ranking in the Top 10 in the state in scoring and averaged 18.2 points per game with nine rebounds per game as a senior.

Sloter was regarded as a two-star recruit by the Rivals.com, ESPN.com and Scout.com recruiting networks. He received scholarship offers to play as quarterback from Tulane and Southern Miss. Sloter had been recruited hard by then Tulane assistant Rickey Bustle, and when Bustle wound at Southern Miss to be the offensive coordinator, Sloter committed to Southern Miss.

== College career ==
=== Southern Miss ===
In his first season at Southern Miss, Sloter got red-shirted by the coaches in order for him to be able to compete for the starting job the next spring with a chance to be the Golden Eagles' 2013 starter as a redshirt freshman. Academically, he was named to the Conference USA Commissioner's Academic Honor Roll.

Prior to the 2013 season, head coach Ellis Johnson was fired and replaced by Todd Monken. With the new regime, Sloter found himself fourth on the quarterback depth chart, so he asked the coaches to work with the wide receivers and by season's end he was granted a starting role as a slot receiver, finishing the year with 5 catches for 35 yards and a touchdown. As a sophomore, Sloter concentrated on developing his receiving skills but was buried down the depth chart, posting only 2 catches for 12 yards during the season. Heading into his junior season, Sloter was informed that his scholarship was being pulled. He decided to transfer to the University of Northern Colorado to have a chance to play quarterback.

=== Northern Colorado ===
In his first year with the Bears, Sloter was initially used in a variety of position groups that included wide receiver and kickoff and punt return units until halfway through the regular season the team lost their backup quarterback, so Sloter was asked to move back to be the backup quarterback. Statistically, he had two rushes for 5 yards and caught 6 passes for 60 yards on the season.

Entering his senior season in 2016, Sloter was named the backup quarterback to the starter Jacob Knipp. In the opening game of the season against Rocky Mountain College, Sloter ended up playing an entire half but threw only three passes, going 0-for-3 with an interception on his first attempt. The following week, the Bears faced Abilene Christian on the road when Knipp injured his shoulder in the first drive of the game. Sloter came in and threw for 408 yards and 7 touchdowns and won the game 55–52. He was named the Big Sky Player of the Week and FCS Offensive Player of the Week for his performance. In his final college game, he passed for a school-record 438 passing yards and 6 touchdowns against Cal Poly. Sloter finished the season with 2,656 passing yards, 29 touchdown passes and 10 interceptions in ten games. His 29 TD passes set a new UNC Division I single season program record and was named the Male Athlete of the Year.

== Professional career ==
After graduating from college, Sloter did not receive an invitation to attend the 2017 NFL Combine; instead, Sloter attended the Northern Colorado pro day. He ran a 4.65 second 40-yard dash, and posted a 9'1" broad jump. Sloter also registered an arm speed of 58 miles per hour, 1 mile per hour shy of the best-clocked throwing speed at that year's NFL Combine.

Pre-draft measurables
Height	Weight	40-yard dash	10-yard split	20-yard split	20-yard shuttle	Three-cone drill	Vertical jump	Broad jump
6 ft 4 3/4 in (1.95 m)	211 lb (96 kg)	4.79 s	1.54 s	2.81 s	4.61 s	7.53 s	30.5 in (0.77 m)	9 ft 1 in (2.77 m)
All values from Northern Colorado Pro Day

=== Denver Broncos ===
Sloter signed with the Denver Broncos as an undrafted free agent on May 13, 2017. In the preseason, Sloter completed 31 of 43 passes for 413 yards with three touchdowns and no interceptions for a passer rating of 125.4, the highest of any rookie quarterback. He was waived by the Broncos on September 2, 2017.

=== Minnesota Vikings (first stint) ===
On September 3, 2017, Sloter was signed to the Minnesota Vikings' practice squad. He was promoted to the active roster on September 16, 2017.

On August 31, 2019, Sloter was waived by the Vikings.

=== Arizona Cardinals ===
On September 3, 2019, Sloter was signed to the Arizona Cardinals practice squad.

=== Detroit Lions ===
On November 30, 2019, Sloter was signed by the Detroit Lions off the Cardinals practice squad following an injury to Jeff Driskel. Sloter saw no playing time while being the backup to David Blough for the last four games of the season.

He was released after the Lions signed Chase Daniel on March 17, 2020.

=== Chicago Bears ===
Sloter had a tryout with the Chicago Bears on August 17, 2020. On November 8, 2020, he joined their practice squad.

=== Las Vegas Raiders ===
On January 15, 2021, Sloter signed a reserve/future contract with the Las Vegas Raiders. He was released on April 15, 2021. He re-signed with their practice squad on September 20, 2021. He was released on October 12.

=== Minnesota Vikings (second stint) ===
On December 28, 2021, Sloter was signed to the Minnesota Vikings' active roster after backup quarterback Sean Mannion was placed on the Reserve/COVID-19 list. He was waived on January 3, 2022.

=== New Orleans Breakers ===
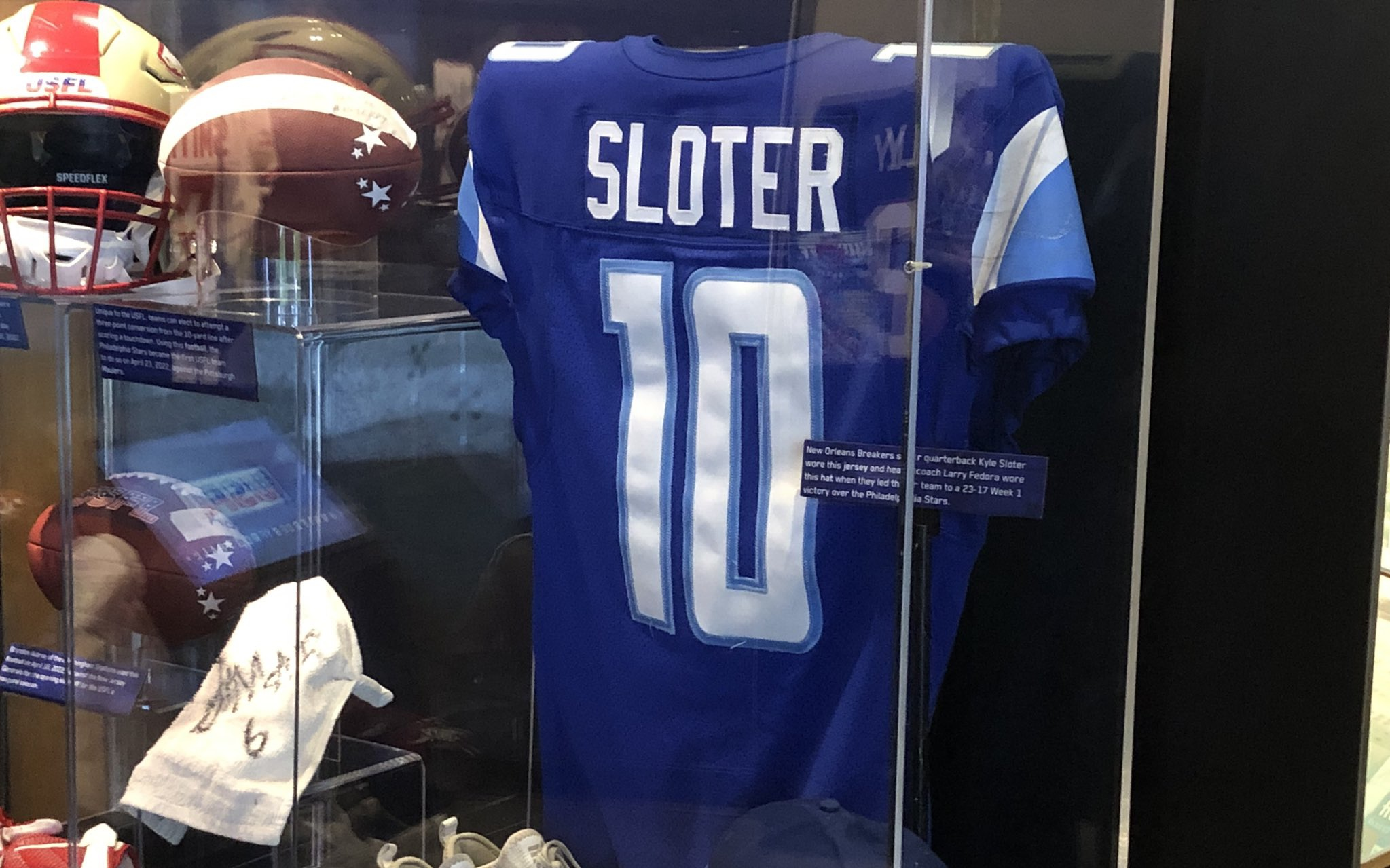
Sloter's New Orleans Breakers Jersey in display at the Pro Football Hall of Fame

Sloter was selected in the 1st Round of the 2022 USFL draft by the New Orleans Breakers of the United States Football League.

Sloter was awarded Week 2 Offensive Player of the Week after his performance in the Breakers 34–3 rout of divisional rival, the Tampa Bay Bandits. In Week 4, Kyle Sloter found Jonathan Adams for the game-winning touchdown with 0:10 seconds left against the Houston Gamblers.

Sloter and the Breakers made history in Week 7 by forcing the first overtime in league history with a 27–27 tie at the end of regulation vs the Michigan Panthers. The Breakers would win the first USFL overtime game by converting 2 of 3 2 point tries defeating the Panthers 31–27. Sloter finished that game with a 64.1 completion %, 266 yards, and 2 touchdowns. Sloter was awarded his second Offensive Player of the Week in Week 7.

On June 16, 2022, Sloter was named to the All-USFL Team. Sloter finished the regular season second in the league in passing yards with 1,798 and helped the Breakers become one of the league's top offenses. Sloter had nine passing touchdowns and one rushing touchdown compared to 11 interceptions, but he was far more accurate to start the season before multiple injuries bothered him down the stretch of the season. Sloter's championship hopes fell short after the Birmingham Stallions beat the Breakers 31–17 in the semi-final.

Sloter's Breakers jersey was put in display at the Pro Football Hall of Fame.

=== Jacksonville Jaguars ===
Sloter had a free agent visit with the Jacksonville Jaguars on July 23, 2022. The next day, Sloter signed with the Jaguars. He was released on August 9, 2022.

=== Arlington Renegades ===
Sloter was selected by the Arlington Renegades in the 2023 XFL draft.

In Week 3, Sloter was named the starter against the Orlando Guardians over Drew Plitt. Sloter completed 18 of 23 passes for 124 yards and a touchdown in the 10–9 win.

He was released on March 27, 2023. Sloter started in 4 games, completing 61 of 101 of his passes, 499 yards, 1 touchdown pass and 4 interceptions.

=== Birmingham Stallions ===
Sloter signed with the Birmingham Stallions of the USFL on April 20, 2023, and was subsequently transferred to the team's inactive list. He was not part of the roster after the 2024 UFL dispersal draft on January 15, 2024.

== Career statistics ==
=== USFL ===
Legend
	Led the league
**Bold**	Career high

==== Regular season ====
Year	Team	Games			Passing									Rushing					Sacks		Fumbles	
Year	Team	GP	GS	Record	Cmp	Att	Pct	Yds	Y/A	Lng	TD	Int	Rtg	Att	Yds	Y/A	Lng	TD	Sck	Yds	Fum	Lost
2022	NO	9	9	**6–3**	**168**	**291**	57.7	**1,798**	**6.2**	?	**9**	**11**	**70.5**	**19**	**54**	2.8	**13**	**1**	**12**	**64**	?	?
2023	ARL	6	4	2–2	61	101	**60.4**	499	4.9	41	1	4	59.8	8	27	**3.4**	11	0	6	42	?	?
Career		15	13	8−5	229	392	58.4	2,297	5.9	?	10	15	67.8	27	81	3.0	13	1	18	106	?	?

==== Postseason ====
Year	Team	Games			Passing									Rushing					Sacks		Fumbles	
Year	Team	GP	GS	Record	Cmp	Att	Pct	Yds	Y/A	Lng	TD	Int	Rtg	Att	Yds	Y/A	Lng	TD	Sck	Yds	Fum	Lost
2022	NO	1	1	0–1	22	40	55.0	328	8.2	13	1	2	69.6	1	4	4.0	4	0	0	0	?	?
Career		1	1	0−1	22	40	55.0	328	8.2	13	1	2	69.6	1	4	4.0	4	0	0	0	?	?

=== College ===
Season	Team	Passing							Rushing				Receiving			
Season	Team	Cmp	Att	Pct	Yds	Y/A	TD	Int	Att	Yds	Avg	TD	Rec	Yds	Avg	TD
2013	Southern Miss	0	0	0	0	0.0	0	0	0	0	0	0	6	39	7.0	5
2014	Southern Miss	0	0	0	0	0.0	0	0	0	0	0	0	2	12	6.0	0
2015	Northern Colorado	0	1	0	0	0.0	0	0	2	−1	−0.5	0	6	65	10.8	0
2016	Northern Colorado	198	319	62.1	2,656	8.3	29	10	72	32	0.4	3	0	0	0.0	0
Career		198	320	62.1	2,656	8.3	29	10	74	31	0.4	3	14	112	8.6	5
