= New Orleans Breakers =

New Orleans Breakers may refer to:

- New Orleans Breakers (1984)
- New Orleans Breakers (2022)
