= Larry Fedora =

American football player and coach (born 1962)

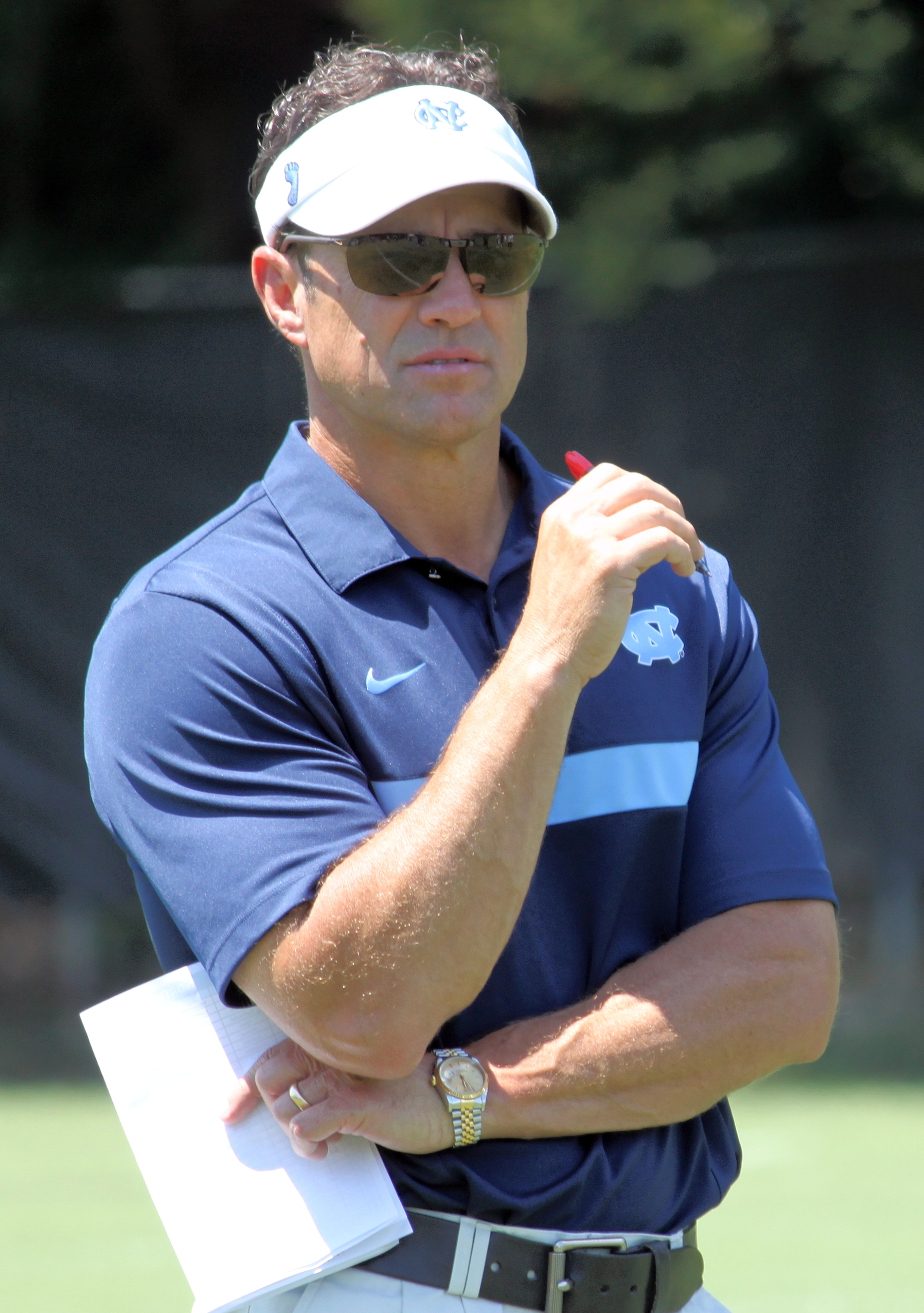
- Fedora in 2012

Biographical details
- Born: September 10, 1962 (age 64); College Station, Texas, U.S.

Playing career
- 1981–1984: Austin
- Position: Wide receiver

Coaching career (HC unless noted)
- 1986: Austin (GA)
- 1987–1990: Garland HS (TX) (assistant)
- 1991–1996: Baylor (WR/TE/RB)
- 1997–1998: Air Force (PGC/WR)
- 1999–2001: Middle Tennessee (OC)
- 2002: Florida (RGC/RB/WR)
- 2003: Florida (PGC/RB/WR)
- 2004: Florida (OC/RB/WR)
- 2005–2007: Oklahoma State (OC)
- 2008–2011: Southern Miss
- 2012–2018: North Carolina
- 2019: Texas (analyst)
- 2020: Baylor (OC/QB)
- 2022: New Orleans Breakers

Head coaching record
- Overall: 79–62 (college); 6–4 (USFL)
- Bowls: 3–5
- Tournaments: 0–1 (USFL playoffs)

Accomplishments and honors

Championships
- C-USA (2011); C-USA East Division (2011); ACC Coastal Division (2015)

Herbert Lawrence Fedora (born September 10, 1962) is an American football coach and former player who is the former coach and general manager for the New Orleans Breakers of the United States Football League (USFL). He previously served as head coach at the University of Southern Mississippi from 2008 to 2011, the University of North Carolina at Chapel Hill from 2012 to 2018, and the offensive coordinator and quarterbacks coach at Baylor University in 2020.

== Coaching career ==
Fedora played wide receiver at Austin College before starting his coaching career as a graduate assistant there in 1986. He spent four seasons as head coach of the junior varsity team at Garland High School, which at the time was a powerhouse in Texas high school football, but then returned to the collegiate ranks, coaching tight ends, wide receivers and running backs for six seasons (1991–96) at Baylor. Fedora moved on to coach the passing game and receivers at United States Air Force Academy from 1997 to 1998, before he became offensive coordinator at Middle Tennessee State University in 1999. In 2002, he was hired by Ron Zook to join his coaching staff at the University of Florida. Fedora served as run game coordinator in 2002, perimeter game coordinator in 2003 and offensive coordinator in 2004. During those three seasons, Fedora also coached the running backs and receivers.

In 2005, Fedora joined Mike Gundy's staff at Oklahoma State. His younger brother, Lee Fedora, served as a high school head football coach in Texas for 24 years, most recently at A&M Consolidated High School in College Station, Texas, and previously coached Navasota High School in Navasota, Texas to two Texas state championships in 2012 and 2014.

Fedora is a proponent of the spread offense Fedora drew several assistant coaching offers from top-tier schools including LSU and Alabama as well as some head coaching offers including Rice and Air Force. Earning $393,000 a year at Oklahoma State, Fedora was one of the top paid offensive coordinators in the country. In November 2007, Fedora was rumored to be a candidate for the head coaching job at Baylor University, which eventually went to Art Briles.

=== Southern Miss ===
On December 11, 2007, Fedora was named the new head coach of Southern Miss, replacing outgoing Jeff Bower. He signed a four-year contract with a $650,000 base salary, but incentives in the contract could bring the contract close to $900,000.

He made a big splash in his first recruiting season, as Fedora was able to land five-star prospect DeAndre Brown, who had offers from several Southeastern Conference schools, such as LSU, Ole Miss, and Auburn. Southern Miss was generally regarded as having the best recruiting class of the mid-major schools.

Fedora opened his first season as head coach at Southern Miss with a 51–21 drubbing of Louisiana–Lafayette, in which the Golden Eagles broke the school record for total yards in a single game with 633.

Under Fedora, Southern Miss notched the four most prolific offensive seasons in its 100-year football history. His players also graduated at a higher rate than at any time in school history.

In 2011, Fedora led his 24th-ranked Southern Mississippi team to winning the Conference USA championship by defeating Kevin Sumlin's then-No. 6 ranked and then-undefeated, Houston Cougars, two weeks after losing to UAB.

=== North Carolina ===
On December 7, 2011, ESPN's Joe Schad reported that Fedora accepted an offer to take the job at North Carolina, but still planned to coach the Golden Eagles in the 2011 Hawai'i Bowl. His hiring was officially announced the next day.

He was formally introduced as UNC's 34th full-time head coach on December 9. He promised to implement an aggressive, attacking philosophy on both sides of the ball, with the same wide-open spread offense he implemented at Southern Miss and a blitz-heavy defense. He summed up his philosophy with a quote from George S. Patton—"Instead of waiting to see what might develop, attack constantly, vigorously and viciously. Never let up, never stop, always attack." He vowed that Tar Heel football would be known for "playing smart, playing fast, and playing physical." Fedora was already a familiar face to recently hired UNC athletic director Bubba Cunningham, who had arrived a few months earlier from Conference USA rival Tulsa.

Fedora knew that he would not be able to compete in post-season play in his first year due to NCAA probation for recruiting and academic violations. Fedora led the Golden Eagles in the Hawaii Bowl, officially beginning his duties at UNC on January 1. His first season at UNC saw the Tar Heels finish with their first winning record in ACC play since 2004 and their third winning conference record of the millennium. Notably, they notched their first win over North Carolina State since 2006. Their probation kept them from being considered for the ACC Championship Game.

Following the firing of Tennessee coach Derek Dooley, Fedora was a prime candidate to succeed him. However, on December 5, one of UNC's early recruits, Jordan Fieulleteau, told The News & Observer and Inside Carolina that Fedora had assured him he would not leave UNC. A day later, Fedora told his team at their last meeting of the season that he would remain their coach. According to WNCN in Goldsboro, Fedora spoke with former Baylor coach Chuck Reedy, who'd given him his first full-time collegiate job, and said that he "turned down more money than I ever thought I'd see" because he was more than happy in Chapel Hill.

Fedora's second season in Chapel Hill got off to a sluggish start, with five losses in their first six games, including a dismal 55–31 loss to East Carolina. However, the team recovered to win five of its final six games, including an unprecedented 80–20 thrashing of Old Dominion—the most points that a Tar Heel team has ever scored. But the Tar Heels then lost for the second straight year to their archrival Duke. The Tar Heels defeated Cincinnati 39–17 in the 2013 Belk Bowl in Charlotte.

In 2014, the Tar Heels struggled through a 6–6 season and a 40–21 loss to Rutgers in the 2014 Quick Lane Bowl. Partly to address this, Fedora hired former Auburn head coach Gene Chizik as defensive coordinator for the 2015 season. The result was one of the greatest regular seasons in school history. After a season-opening loss to South Carolina, the Tar Heels reeled off 11 straight wins, the longest winning streak in the modern history of the program. As part of that streak, they rolled over Duke 66–31—the most points that the Tar Heels have ever scored in the history of the rivalry, and the most that a Tar Heel team has ever scored in ACC play. A week later, they defeated Miami 59–21 to clinch their first nine-win season in 18 years, and their first undefeated home slate in 19 years. They then defeated Virginia Tech in overtime 30–27 to clinch their first official Coastal Division championship, as well as the eighth 10-win season in school history. A week later, they knocked off N.C. State 45–34, mainly on the strength of a 220-yard rushing performance by sophomore tailback Elijah Hood. This gave the Tar Heels their first undefeated conference slate since 1980. The 11 wins also set a new school record for regular-season wins, and was only the fourth time in school history that a Tar Heel team had won that many. The day before the 2015 ACC Championship Game, Fedora signed a new seven-year contract. The Tar Heels lost the championship game to #1 Clemson 45–37 for their first loss in over two months.

For the 2016 season, Fedora coached the Tar Heels to an 8–5 (5–3) record. Unable to duplicate his team's success from a season earlier, the Tar Heels lost in the Sun Bowl to Stanford with a score of 25–23. With the loss, Fedora is currently 3–5 all-time in bowl games.

In the summer of 2018, Fedora criticized the proposed changes to the kickoff rule in football. He stated that "Our game is under attack" and compared threats to football to American politics by expressing that he "fear[s] that the game will get pushed so far to one extreme that you won’t recognize it 10 years from now. And I do believe that if it gets to that point, our country goes down, too.” He then relayed a story where he purportedly asked a three-star general what makes America's military the "greatest" on earth. The general replied "That’s easy. We’re the only football-playing nation in the world."

On November 25, 2018, following a 1–7 season in conference play for the 2nd season in a row and an overtime home loss to rival NC State, North Carolina fired Fedora.

=== Texas ===
Fedora joined Tom Herman's staff as an analyst on February 18, 2019.

=== Baylor ===
Fedora was named offensive coordinator and quarterbacks coach at Baylor on January 25, 2020, by first-year head coach Dave Aranda. On December 22, 2020, it was reported that Fedora and Baylor had parted ways after one season. Baylor's offense finished 125th nationally in yards per play, and 99th in scoring offense.

=== New Orleans Breakers ===
On January 27, 2022, Fedora was announced as the head coach and general manager of the New Orleans Breakers of the USFL. Fedora resigned on September 15, 2022, stating that he was willing to return but only if the league played all of its games in home markets, something the league was not prepared to do in 2023.

== Head coaching record ==
=== NCAA ===
Year	Team	Overall	Conference	Standing	Bowl/playoffs	Coaches^{#}	AP^{°}
Southern Miss Golden Eagles (Conference USA) (2008–2011)
2008	Southern Miss	7–6	4–4	3rd (East)	W New Orleans		
2009	Southern Miss	7–6	5–3	3rd (East)	L New Orleans		
2010	Southern Miss	8–5	5–3	T–2nd (East)	L Beef 'O' Brady's		
2011	Southern Miss	12–2	6–2	1st (East)	W Hawaii	19	20
Southern Miss:		34–19	20–12				
North Carolina Tar Heels (Atlantic Coast Conference) (2012–2018)
2012	North Carolina	8–4	5–3	T–1st (Coastal)‡			
2013	North Carolina	7–6	4–4	5th (Coastal)	W Belk		
2014	North Carolina	6–7	4–4	T–3rd (Coastal)	L Quick Lane		
2015	North Carolina	11–3	8–0	1st (Coastal)	L Russell Athletic	15	15
2016	North Carolina	8–5	5–3	T–2nd (Coastal)	L Sun		
2017	North Carolina	3–9	1–7	7th (Coastal)			
2018	North Carolina	2–9	1–7	7th (Coastal)			
North Carolina:		45–43	28–28	‡ Ineligible for ACC title, bowl game and Coaches' Poll			
Total:		79–62					
National championship Conference title Conference division title or championship game berth
^{#}Rankings from final Coaches Poll.; ^{°}Rankings from final AP Poll.

=== USFL ===
Team	Year	Regular season					Postseason			
Team	Year	Won	Lost	Ties	Win %	Finish	Won	Lost	Win %	Result
NO	2022	6	4	0	.600	2nd (South Division)	0	1	.000	Lost in Division Finals to Birmingham Stallions
Total		6	4	0	.600		0	1	.000	
