= Vontae =

Vontae is a given name. Notable people with the given name include:

- Vontae Daley-Campbell (born 2001), English soccer player
- Vontae Davis (1988–2024), American football player
- Vontae Diggs (born 1995), American football player

== See also ==
- KaVontae Turpin (born 1996), American football player
