= E. J. Bibbs =

American football player (born 1991)

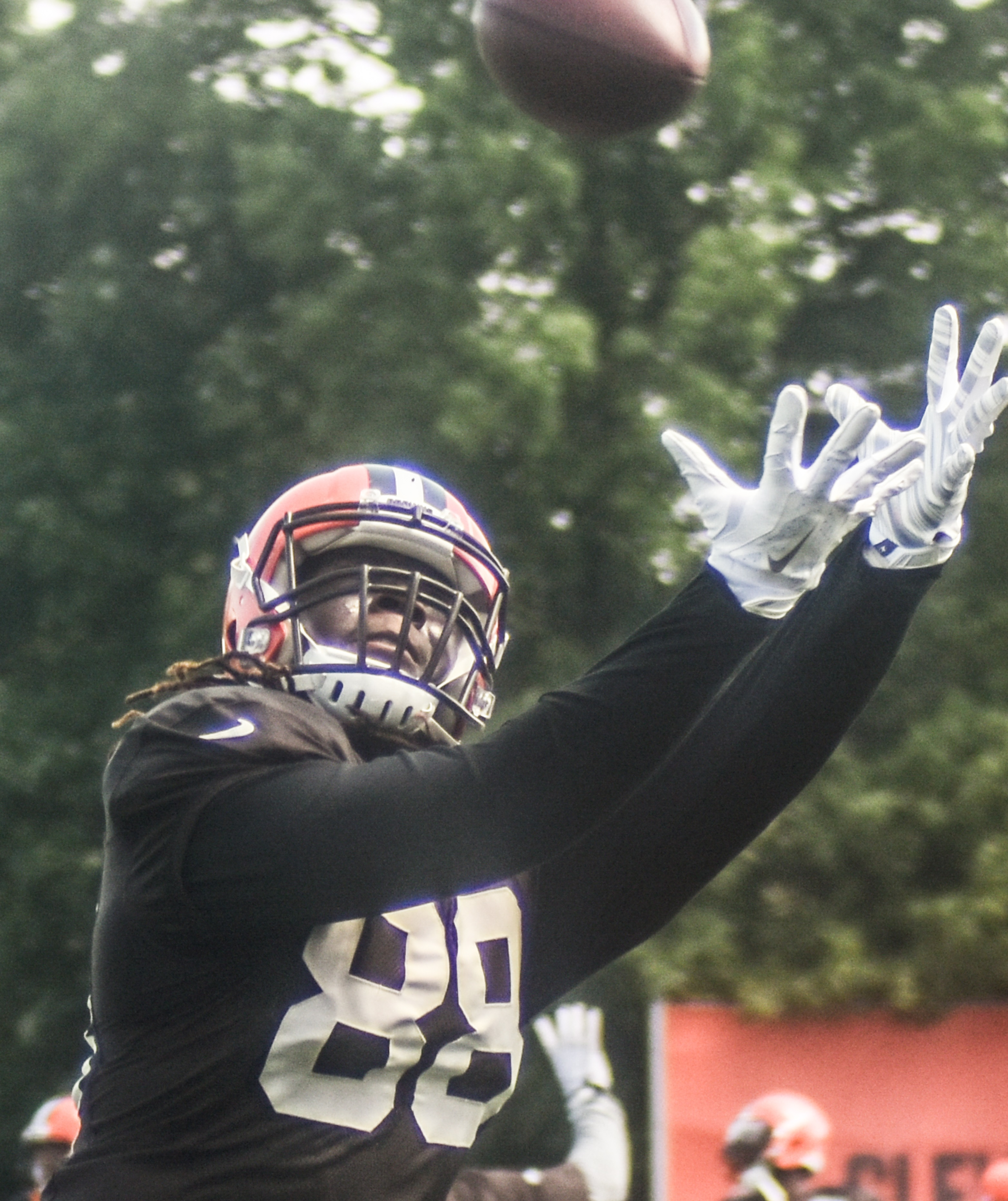
- Bibbs with the Cleveland Browns in 2016

No. 88
- Position: Tight end

Personal information
- Born: August 28, 1991 (age 35); Chicago, Illinois, U.S.
- Listed height: 6 ft 2 in (1.88 m)
- Listed weight: 258 lb (117 kg)

Career information
- High school: Bogan (Chicago)
- College: Iowa State
- NFL draft: 2015: undrafted

Career history
- Cleveland Browns (2015–2016); Jacksonville Jaguars (2016–2017)*; Washington Redskins (2017)*; New York Guardians (2020); New Orleans Breakers (2022–2023)
- * Offseason or practice squad member only

Awards and highlights
- First-team All-Big 12 (2014); Second-team All-Big 12 (2013)

Career NFL statistics
- Receptions: 1
- Receiving yards: 7
- Stats at Pro Football Reference

Emmanuel Lamarr "E. J." Bibbs Jr. (born August 28, 1991) is an American former professional football player who was a tight end in the National Football League (NFL). He was signed by the Cleveland Browns as an undrafted free agent in 2015. He played college football for the Iowa State Cyclones.

== Early life ==
Bibbs attended Bogan High School in Chicago where he starred at both wide receiver and linebacker.

== College career ==
Bibbs originally committed to the University of Iowa before beginning his collegiate career at Arizona Western Community College. After one season at Arizona Western, Bibbs transferred to Iowa State.

Bibbs caught 84 passes for 844 yards and ten touchdowns in two seasons for the Cyclones. Bibbs was a John Mackey Award finalist and first-team all Big 12 Conference in 2014.

== Professional career ==
Pre-draft measurables
Height	Weight	Arm length	Hand span	40-yard dash	10-yard split	20-yard split	20-yard shuttle	Three-cone drill	Vertical jump	Broad jump	Bench press
6 ft 2 in (1.88 m)	258 lb (117 kg)	31 1/8 in (0.79 m)	10 1/4 in (0.26 m)	4.88 s	1.68 s	2.81 s	4.52 s	7.22 s	31.5 in (0.80 m)	9 ft 2 in (2.79 m)	22 reps
All values from NFL Combine/Pro Day

=== Cleveland Browns ===
After going unselected in the 2015 NFL draft, Bibbs signed with the Cleveland Browns on May 3, 2015. He appeared in seven games his rookie year and had one reception for seven yards.

He was released by the Browns on August 29, 2016. He was re-signed to the practice squad on October 5, 2016. He was released by the Browns on October 18, 2016.

=== Jacksonville Jaguars ===
On November 22, 2016, Bibbs was signed to the Jaguars' practice squad. He was released on November 29, 2016. He was re-signed to the practice squad on December 7, 2016. He signed a reserve/future contract with the Jaguars on January 2, 2017. On May 1, 2017, Bibbs was released.

=== Washington Redskins ===
Bibbs was signed by the Washington Redskins on July 27, 2017. He was waived/injured on September 2, 2017 and placed on injured reserve. The team released him with an injury settlement on September 7, 2017.

=== New York Guardians ===
In October 2019, Bibbs was selected by the New York Guardians in the sixth round of the 2020 XFL draft. He had his contract terminated when the league suspended operations on April 10, 2020.

=== New Orleans Breakers ===
On March 10, 2022, Bibbs was drafted by the New Orleans Breakers of the United States Football League. He was transferred to the team's inactive roster on April 22, 2022.

Bibbs was moved to the team's inactive list again on April 20, 2023. Bibbs became a free agent after the 2023 season.
