= Marquis Lucas =

American football player (born 1993)

No. 74
- Position: Offensive tackle

Personal information
- Born: March 25, 1993 (age 33); Miami, Florida, U.S.
- Listed height: 6 ft 4 in (1.93 m)
- Listed weight: 318 lb (144 kg)

Career information
- High school: West Little River (FL) Miami Central
- College: West Virginia
- NFL draft: 2016: undrafted

Career history
- Buffalo Bills (2016)*; Minnesota Vikings (2016–2017)*; Atlanta Falcons (2017)*; Tampa Bay Buccaneers (2017)*; Orlando Apollos (2019); Tampa Bay Vipers (2020); Massachusetts Pirates (2021); New Orleans Breakers (2022–2023); Arlington Renegades (2024)
- * Offseason or practice squad member only
- Stats at Pro Football Reference

Marquis Lucas (born March 25, 1993) is an American former football offensive tackle. He played college football for the Mountaineers at West Virginia University.

== Early life ==
Lucas attended Miami Central High School, where he played football at the right tackle position.

== Professional career ==
Pre-draft measurables
Height	Weight	Arm length	Hand span	40-yard dash	10-yard split	20-yard split	20-yard shuttle	Three-cone drill	Vertical jump	Broad jump	Bench press
6 ft 3 3/8 in (1.91 m)	307 lb (139 kg)	33 3/4 in (0.86 m)	10 in (0.25 m)	5.33 s	1.89 s	3.00 s	4.78 s	8.17 s	22.5 in (0.57 m)	8 ft 5 in (2.57 m)	25 reps
All values from West Virginia's Pro Day

=== Buffalo Bills ===
Lucas joined the Buffalo Bills as an undrafted free agent following the 2016 NFL draft. He was released by the Bills on September 2, 2016.

=== Minnesota Vikings ===
On December 13, 2016, Lucas to the Minnesota Vikings' practice squad. He signed a reserve/futures contract with the Vikings on January 2, 2017. On May 4, 2017, he was waived by the Vikings.

=== Atlanta Falcons ===
On June 15, 2017, Lucas signed with the Atlanta Falcons. He was waived on August 19, 2017.

=== Tampa Bay Buccaneers ===
On August 20, 2017, Lucas was claimed off waivers by the Tampa Bay Buccaneers. He was waived on September 2, 2017, and was signed to the Buccaneers' practice squad the next day. He was placed on the practice squad injured list on September 6. He was released on October 6, 2017.

=== Orlando Apollos ===
In 2018, Lucas joined the Orlando Apollos of the Alliance of American Football. The league ceased operations in April 2019.

=== Tampa Bay Vipers ===
In October 2019, Lucas was drafted by the Tampa Bay Vipers in the 2020 XFL draft. He had his contract terminated when the league suspended operations on April 10, 2020.

=== New Orleans Breakers ===
Lucas was selected in the 7th round of the 2022 USFL draft by the New Orleans Breakers. The Breakers folded when the XFL and USFL merged to create the United Football League (UFL).

=== Arlington Renegades ===
On March 4, 2024, Lucas was signed by the Arlington Renegades of the United Football League (UFL). He was waived on March 21. He was re-signed on May 1, 2024.
