= Shakir Soto =

American football player (born 1994)

No. 92
- Position: Defensive tackle

Personal information
- Born: February 12, 1994 (age 32); Wilkes-Barre, Pennsylvania, U.S.
- Listed height: 6 ft 3 in (1.91 m)
- Listed weight: 290 lb (132 kg)

Career information
- High school: G.A.R. Memorial (Wilkes-Barre, Pennsylvania)
- College: Pittsburgh
- NFL draft: 2017: undrafted

Career history
- Denver Broncos (2017)*; Las Vegas Raiders (2017–2018)*; Las Vegas Raiders (2017)*; San Diego Fleet (2019); Dallas Cowboys (2019)*; Seattle Seahawks (2019–2020)*; BC Lions (2021)*; New Orleans Breakers (2022); St. Louis BattleHawks (2023)*; San Antonio Brahmas (2023)
- * Offseason or practice squad member only
- Stats at Pro Football Reference

Shakir Jammal Soto (born February 12, 1994) is an American former football defensive tackle. He played college football for the University of Pittsburgh. After going undrafted in the 2017 NFL draft, Soto signed as a free agent with the Denver Broncos. Over the course of four years in the NFL, Soto was signed to the Las Vegas Raiders, Dallas Cowboys, and Seattle Seahawks.

== Early life ==
Soto was born one of four children to Rhonda Vieney. He has two brothers and one sister. His uncle Terry Vieney played college football at Bloomsburg University.

Soto played high school football at G.A.R Memorial as a defensive lineman, earning Class AA All-State honors twice.

== College career ==
Soto enrolled at the University of Pittsburgh where he played in defensive lineman, defensive end and defensive tackle positions from 2013 to 2016. While at Pittsburgh, Soto was a communication major.

== Professional career ==
=== Denver Broncos ===
On May 12, 2017, the Denver Broncos signed Soto to play as a defensive tackle. He was cut from the team four months later on September 3, 2017.

=== Las Vegas Raiders ===
On December 21, 2017, the Las Vegas Raiders added Soto to the practice squad. On January 2, 2018, the Las Vegas Raiders signed Soto to as part of its reserve roster. On September 1, 2018, Soto was waived and shortly after cut from the team the following day.

=== San Diego Fleet ===
Soto started 2019 with the San Diego Fleet of the Alliance of American Football (AAF). He made four sacks and 20 tackles in eight games.

=== Dallas Cowboys ===
On April 9, 2019, Soto was signed by the Dallas Cowboys. Soto was waived on August 31, 2019, before being cut from the team on September 1.

=== Seattle Seahawks ===
On December 24, 2019, the Seattle Seahawks added Soto to the practice squad. On May 5, 2020, Soto was cut from the team.

=== BC Lions ===
Soto was signed to the practice roster of the BC Lions in October 2021.

=== New Orleans Breakers ===
Soto was selected with the eighth pick of the 24th round of the 2022 USFL draft by the New Orleans Breakers.

=== St. Louis BattleHawks ===
The St. Louis BattleHawks selected Soto in the sixth round of the 2023 XFL Supplemental Draft on January 1, 2023.

=== San Antonio Brahmas ===
Soto signed with the San Antonio Brahmas of the XFL on March 8, 2023. He was released on July 10, 2023.
