= Turner Bernard =

American football player (born 1998)

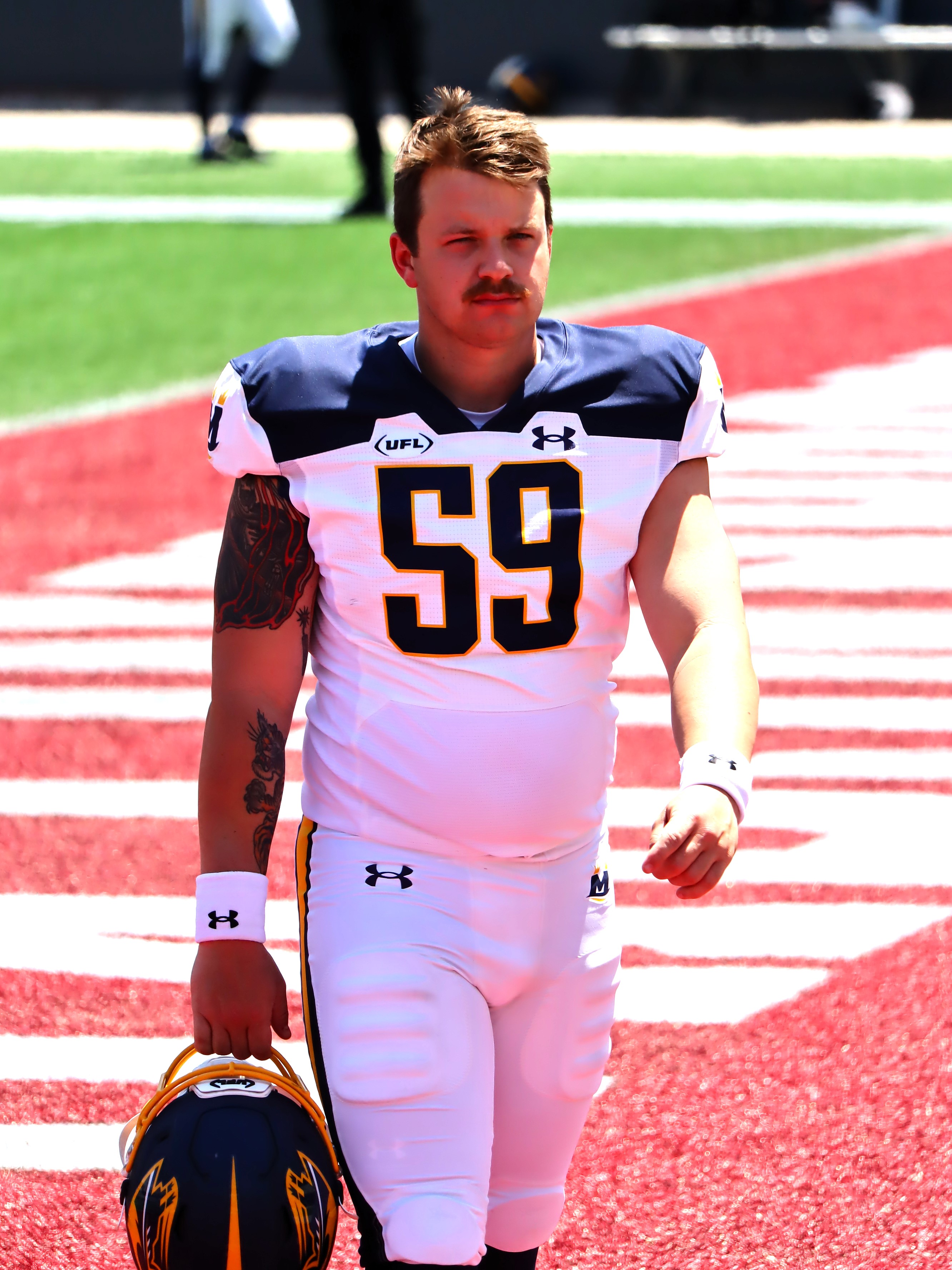
- Bernard with the Memphis Showboats in 2025

No. 59
- Position: Long snapper

Personal information
- Born: August 14, 1998 (age 28); Phoenix, Arizona, U.S.
- Listed height: 6 ft 1 in (1.85 m)
- Listed weight: 239 lb (108 kg)

Career information
- High school: Mountain Ridge (Glendale, Arizona)
- College: San Diego State (2016–2020)
- NFL draft: 2021: undrafted

Career history
- Minnesota Vikings (2021)*; New Orleans Breakers (2022–2023); Memphis Showboats (2024–2025)
- * Offseason or practice squad member only
- Stats at Pro Football Reference

Turner Bernard (born August 14, 1998) is a former American football long snapper. He played college football at San Diego State.

== High school ==
Bernard was a three-year starter at Mountain Ridge High School in Glendale, Arizona. While at Mountain Ridge, he was a two-time all-state long snapper. During this time, he received a five-star rating from Kohl's Kicking and was named the nation's top incoming long snapper. Bernard was also selected as one of two long snappers to play in the 2016 high school Under Armour All-America Game. Bernard turned down offers from Utah and Northwestern before choosing to attend San Diego State.

== College career ==
Bernard received an athletic scholarship to attend San Diego State where he redshirted the 2016 season due to an ACL injury.

Bernard started all 13 games for the 2017, 2018, and 2019 seasons; as well as all four games in the shortened 2020 COVID-19 season. During his time at San Diego State, he was known as a fast and accurate snapper.

== Professional career ==
Pre-draft measurables
Height	Weight	Arm length	Hand span	40-yard dash	10-yard split	20-yard split	20-yard shuttle	Three-cone drill	Vertical jump	Broad jump
6 ft 1 in (1.85 m)	233 lb (106 kg)	30 3/8 in (0.77 m)	9 1/8 in (0.23 m)	5.18 s	1.77 s	3.03 s	4.79 s	7.72 s	25.5 in (0.65 m)	7 ft 10 in (2.39 m)
All values from NFL Combine/Pro Day

=== Minnesota Vikings ===
Bernard was signed as an undrafted free agent by the Minnesota Vikings on May 1, 2021. He was waived on August 16, 2021.

=== New Orleans Breakers ===
Bernard was drafted in the 7th round of the 2022 USFL draft by the New Orleans Breakers of the United States Football League (USFL). Bernard played two seasons with the Breakers until the team was dissolved when the XFL and USFL merged to create the United Football League (UFL).

=== Memphis Showboats ===
On January 15, 2024, Bernard was drafted by the Memphis Showboats of the newly formed United Football League (UFL). He re-signed with the team on August 26, 2024.
