= Davin Bellamy =

American football player (born 1994)

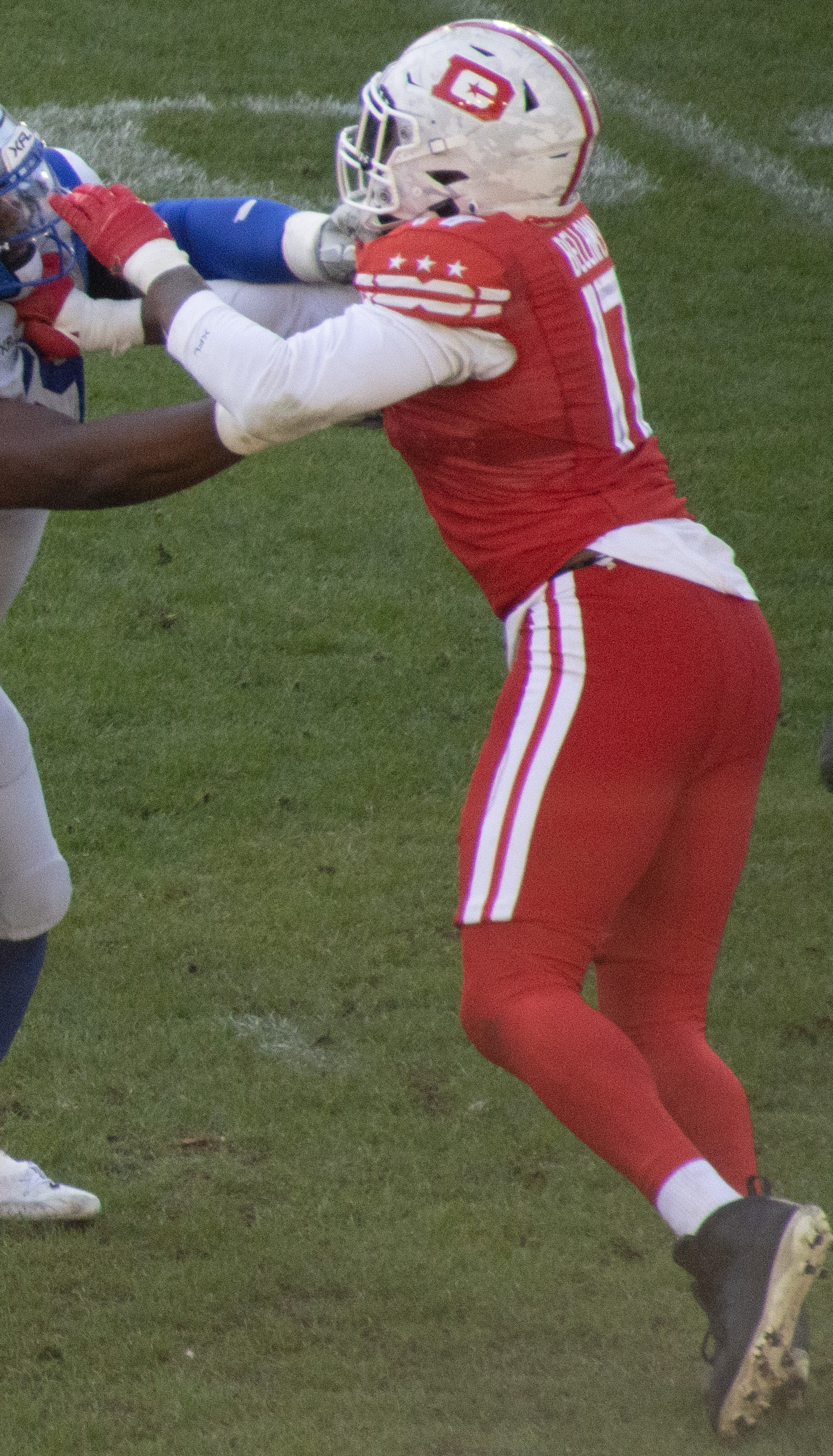
- Bellamy with the DC Defenders in 2023

No. 15 – DC Defenders
- Position: Defensive end
- Roster status: Active

Personal information
- Born: December 27, 1994 (age 31); Chamblee, Georgia, U.S.
- Listed height: 6 ft 4 in (1.93 m)
- Listed weight: 259 lb (117 kg)

Career information
- High school: Chamblee (GA)
- College: Georgia
- NFL draft: 2018: undrafted

Career history
- Houston Texans (2018–2019)*; Cincinnati Bengals (2019)*; Houston Texans (2019–2020)*; Tennessee Titans (2021)*; San Francisco 49ers (2021)*; Los Angeles Chargers (2021)*; New Orleans Breakers (2022); DC Defenders (2023–2025); Houston Roughnecks (2025); DC Defenders (2025)
- * Offseason or practice squad member only

Awards and highlights
- UFL champion (2025); All-XFL Team (2023); All-USFL Team (2022)
- Stats at Pro Football Reference

Davin Jamaurie Bellamy (born December 27, 1994) is an American professional football defensive end for the DC Defenders of the United Football League (UFL). He played college football at Georgia. He signed with the Houston Texans after going undrafted in the 2018 NFL draft.

== Professional career ==
Pre-draft measurables
| Height | Weight | Arm length | Hand span | Wingspan | 20-yard shuttle | Three-cone drill | Vertical jump | Broad jump | Bench press |
|---|---|---|---|---|---|---|---|---|---|
| 6 ft 3 3/4 in (1.92 m) | 255 lb (116 kg) | 33 1/4 in (0.84 m) | 9 1/2 in (0.24 m) | 6 ft 8 1/2 in (2.04 m) | 4.58 s | 7.58 s | 26.0 in (0.66 m) | 8 ft 5 in (2.57 m) | 19 reps |
All values from NFL Combine/Pro Day

=== Houston Texans (first stint) ===
Bellamy signed with the Houston Texans as an undrafted free agent on May 11, 2018. He was waived on September 1, 2018, and was signed to the practice squad the next day. He signed a reserve/future contract with the Texans on January 7, 2019. The Texans waived him on August 31 during final roster cuts.

=== Cincinnati Bengals ===
On September 27, 2019, Bellamy was signed to the Cincinnati Bengals practice squad. His practice squad contract with the team expired on January 6, 2020.

=== Houston Texans (second stint) ===
On January 6, 2020, Bellamy was signed to the Houston Texans practice squad. He signed a reserve/future contract with the Texans on January 13, 2020.

On September 5, 2020, Bellamy was waived by the Texans and signed to the practice squad the next day. He was placed on the practice squad/injured list on November 9 after having a benign cyst drained. His practice squad contract with the team expired after the season on January 11, 2021.

=== Tennessee Titans ===
On January 14, 2021, Bellamy signed a reserve/future contract with the Tennessee Titans. He was waived with a non-football injury designation on May 17, 2021.

=== San Francisco 49ers ===
On August 6, 2021, Bellamy signed a one-year contract with the San Francisco 49ers, but was waived six days later.

=== Los Angeles Chargers ===
On August 17, 2021, Bellamy signed with the Los Angeles Chargers. He was waived on August 30, 2021.

=== New Orleans Breakers ===
Bellamy was selected with the first pick of the second round of the 2022 USFL draft by the New Orleans Breakers. Bellamy was awarded Week 1 Defensive Player of the Week after his six-tackle, three-sack performance against the Philadelphia Stars. He was ruled inactive for the team's game against the Houston Gamblers on May 8, 2022. The Breakers moved Bellamy back to the active roster on May 12. He became a free agent when his contract expired on December 31, 2022.

=== DC Defenders (first stint) ===
On January 1, 2023, Bellamy was selected by the DC Defenders in the first round of the 2023 XFL Supplemental Draft. He re-signed with the team on March 4, 2024. He was released on April 28, 2025.

=== Houston Roughnecks ===
On April 28, 2025, Bellamy was claimed by the Houston Roughnecks of the United Football League (UFL). He was released on May 6.

=== DC Defenders (second stint) ===
On June 3, 2025, Bellamy re-signed with the Defenders.
