= 2013 Belk Bowl =

Cincinnati Bearcats	North Carolina Tar Heels
(9–3)	(6–6)
The American	ACC
17	39
Head coach: Tommy Tuberville	Head coach: Larry Fedora
	1	2	3	4	Total
Cincinnati	0	3	7	7	17
North Carolina	16	7	13	3	39
- Date: December 28, 2013
- Season: 2013
- Stadium: Bank of America Stadium
- Location: Charlotte, North Carolina
- MVP: Ryan Switzer, UNC
- Favorite: N. Carolina by 3
- Referee: Steve Barth (C-USA)
- Attendance: 45,211
- Payout: US$1.7 million

United States TV coverage
- Network: ESPN
- Announcers: TV: Carter Blackburn (play-by-play), Danny Kanell (analyst), Allison Williams (sideline); Radio: Tom Hart (play-by-play), David Diaz-Infante (analyst), Cara Capuano (sideline)
- Nielsen ratings: 3.1

The 2013 Belk Bowl was an American college football bowl game that was played on December 28, 2013, at Bank of America Stadium in Charlotte, North Carolina. It was one of the 2013–14 bowl games that concluded the 2013 FBS football season. The twelfth edition of the Belk Bowl, it featured the Cincinnati Bearcats of the American Athletic Conference against the North Carolina Tar Heels of the Atlantic Coast Conference. It began at 3:20 p.m. EST and aired on ESPN. The game was sponsored by the Belk department store company. North Carolina defeated Cincinnati by a score of 39–17.

The Bearcats accepted their invitation after earning a 9–3 record for the season, while the Tar Heels accepted their bid after going 6–6 on the season.

== Teams ==
=== Cincinnati Bearcats ===
The Bearcats continued their winning ways in the American Athletic Conference, finishing at 9–3 overall and 6–2 in the American. After a 31–24 overtime defeat at home against the rival Louisville Cardinals (which saw Louisville retain The Keg of Nails for the foreseeable future), bowl director Will Webb extended an invitation to play in the game.

This was Cincinnati's second consecutive (and overall) Belk Bowl; the Bearcats had previously won the game in 2012, defeating the Duke Blue Devils by a score of 48–34. It was the final Belk Bowl played under their six-year partnership with The American (formerly the Big East, as that tie-in went to the Southeastern Conference the following year.

=== North Carolina Tar Heels ===
College football analyst Phil Steele and CBS Sports writer Jerry Palm (as of December 6) projected that the Tar Heels would be the other team invited to play in the game. This was confirmed on December 8.

The Tar Heels were only the sixth team since the regular season expanded to 12 games in 2006 to start the season 1–5 and be invited to a bowl. They reeled off five consecutive wins, including four straight conference wins, to become bowl eligible. This will be North Carolina's fourth appearance in what is now the Belk Bowl. They previously appeared in the game in 2004 (losing to Boston College), 2008 (losing to West Virginia) and 2009 (losing to Pittsburgh). The 2004 appearance came when the bowl was known as the Continental Tire Bowl; the 2008 and 2009 appearances came when it was the Meineke Car Care Bowl. The Tar Heels have accounted for two of the largest crowds in the bowl's history. The 2008 game attracted a crowd of 73,712, the most in the bowl's history. The 2004 game attracted a crowd of 70,412. Charlotte is only two hours south of Chapel Hill, and the Tar Heels have a large alumni and fan base in the area.

== Game summary ==
=== First quarter ===
After receiving the opening kickoff, North Carolina went three-and-out and punted, but on the return, Cincinnati's Anthony McClung fumbled the return, giving the Tar Heels the ball back and the Cincinnati 34. However, North Carolina was forced to settle for a 40-yard field goal try that Thomas Moore missed. The Bearcats took possession of the ball at their own 23-yard line, and achieved a first down before a sack that lost 18 yards decimated the drive, and they ultimately punted. North Carolina was first to the scoreboard on their subsequent drive, scoring on a 2-yard touchdown run by Romar Morris after 11 plays for 68 yards. Cincinnati failed to execute on their next drive, punting, and North Carolina's Ryan Switzer returned the punt for 33 yards (the punt went 34 yards), but the return was called back due to a holding penalty, negating the Tar Heels' good field position, instead putting them back at their own 35-yard line. On the ensuing drive by the Tar Heels, they went three-and-out, and during the drive, senior offensive lineman James Hurst went down with an apparent left leg injury, exiting the game; North Carolina punted. The punt pinned Cincinnati inside their own 10-yard line, and on their possession, linebacker Kareem Martin and ram back Brandon Ellerbe sacked quarterback Brendon Kay in the end zone for a safety. North Carolina returner T. J. Logan returned the ensuing free kick 78 yards for a touchdown, making the score 16–0. Cincinnati started their subsequent drive at their own 35-yard line after the kickoff went out of bounds. At the end of the first quarter, they were amidst a drive, approaching the red zone.

=== Second quarter ===
Cincinnati kicker Tony Miliano, who entered the attempt having made just 6-of-15 attempts on the season, made a 34-yard field goal attempt within the first minute of the quarter to make the score 16–3. After that, North Carolina once again embarked on a long drive that lasted 12 plays for 76 yards and 4:01 and culminated with a Jack Tabb 3-yard touchdown reception from Marquise Williams, making the score 23–3. Later in the quarter, Miliano missed a 46-yard field goal attempt, and subsequently the teams exchanged punts. The Tar Heels punted on their next drive after failing to convert a third and ten, instead losing five yards to knock them out of field goal range; the punt was downed at the Cincinnati 6-yard line. Cincinnati did not attempt to score particularly vigorously, not running any pass plays, and ultimately heading into the half trailing by 20.

=== Third quarter ===
Cincinnati received the opening kickoff of the second half, and exclusively ran the ball on the first several plays of the drive, even to the extent that Shaq Washington replaced Kay at quarterback, the latter of whom lined up at wide receiver; on third down and nine, however, Kay returned to quarterback on a passing play, but was sacked for the fifth time of the game, and the Bearcats were forced to punt, and Switzer tied the NCAA-record with his fifth punt return touchdown of the season, recording an 86-yard touchdown; the extra point was no good. Cincinnati finally scored a touchdown on their subsequent drive, via a 15-yard rush by Ralph Abernathy, making the score 29–10. On the ensuing kickoff, Cincinnati kicked the ball out of bounds, setting up North Carolina with solid field position at their own 35-yard line. Early in the drive Eric Ebron, hurdled a defender and hit the ground hard, but quickly re-entered the game, and caught another pass just a few plays later. Later in the drive, Switzer made a catch that converted a fourth down in the red zone; moments later, Morris rushed for a 1-yard touchdown. This time, the extra point was good to culminate a 13-play, 65-yard drive that encapsulated 4:36. Cincinnati ensuing drive stalled, and they punted; Switzer made a fair catch. In the waning seconds of the quarter, Cincinnati entered the red zone.

=== Fourth quarter ===
Utilizing the wildcat formation, Shaq Washington rushed for a touchdown within the first minute of the final quarter of play, pulling the Bearcats within 19. On the ensuing kickoff, Cincinnati recovered a fumble from T. J. Logan, fueling momentum for the Bearcats, who started at the 6-yard line. They started in the wildcat, but when faced with third and goal at the eight-yard line, Kay returned at quarterback and completed a pass, but it was short of the end zone; the Bearcats went for it on fourth down, and Kay threw a pass that bounced off the hands of his intended target, and thus, they turned the ball over. Looking to milk the clock on their ensuing drive, North Carolina achieved a first down prior to losing six yards on a rush to set up third down and long; a pass interference bailed them out on the third and long play, as though the pass was incomplete, the 15-yard penalty gave them an automatic first down. They succeeded in their endeavor to drain time from the clock, ultimately executing a 14-play drive that gained 74 yards and lasted 9:19, and culminated with a 40-yard field goal to complete the scoring.

=== Scoring summary ===
Scoring summary

Quarter	Time	Drive			Team	Scoring information	Score	
Quarter	Time	Plays	Yards	TOP	Team	Scoring information	Cincinnati	North Carolina
1	5:40	11	68	3:39	UNC	Romar Morris 2-yard touchdown run, Thomas Moore kick good	0	7
1	2:25	-	-	-	UNC	Brendon Kay tackled in end zone for a safety by Kareem Martin	0	9
1	2:12	-	-	-	UNC	T. J. Logan, 78-yard punt return (on safety punt), for touchdown, Moore kick good	0	16
2	14:17	10	48	2:55	CINCY	34-yard field goal by Tony Miliano	3	16
2	10:16	12	76	4:01	UNC	Jack Tabb 3-yard touchdown reception from Marquise Williams, Moore kick good	3	23
2	10:41	-	-	-	UNC	Ryan Switzer, 86-yard punt return for touchdown, Moore kick no good	3	29
3	8:08	9	75	2:33	CINCY	Ralph Abernathy 15-yard touchdown run, Miliano kick good	10	29
3	3:32	13	65	4:36	UNC	Morris 1-yard touchdown run, Moore kick good	10	36
4	14:26	3	61	0:44	CINCY	Shaq Washington 10-yard touchdown run, Miliano kick good	17	36
4	2:52	15	74	9:19	UNC	40-yard field goal by Moore	17	39
"TOP" = time of possession. For other American football terms, see Glossary of American football.							Cincinnati 17	North Carolina 39

=== Statistics ===
Statistics	CIN	NC
First downs	20	23
Total offense, plays - yards	72–349	79–345
Rushes-yards (net)	36–168	46–174
Passing yards (net)	181	171
Passes, Comp-Att-Int	16–36–1	19–33–0
Time of Possession	26:36	33:24
