= Mount Pisgah Christian School =

Private Christian school in Johns Creek, Georgia, United States

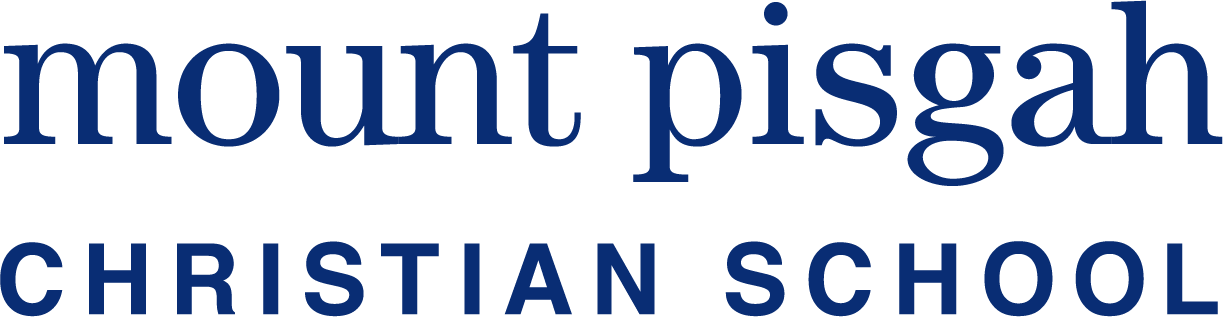

Location
- 9875 Nesbit Ferry Rd; Johns Creek, Georgia; United States; 34°01′08″N 84°16′32″W

Information
- Type: Private
- Established: 1986
- Teaching staff: 56.4 (FTE) (2019–20)
- Grades: Preschool–12th
- Enrollment: 901 (2019–20)
- Student to teacher ratio: 12.0 (2019–20)
- Colors: Red, white, and blue
- Mascot: Paul the Patriot
- Accreditation: Southern Association of Colleges and Schools and Southern Association of Independent Schools
- Website: mountpisgahschool.org

Mount Pisgah Christian School is a private Christian school located in Johns Creek, Georgia, United States. It is located on Nesbit Ferry Road off of Highway 19.

The school is accredited by the Southern Association of Colleges and Schools (SACS) and the Southern Association of Independent Schools (SAIS) including memberships with the National Association of Independent Schools (NAIS), the Georgia High School Association (GHSA) and the Atlanta Christian School Association (ACSA).

== History ==
Mount Pisgah Christian School was founded in 1986 by Mount Pisgah United Methodist Church with the goal of providing an enriching program for students in a Christian environment.

The school opened with 70 preschool students and grew rapidly. In 1991, construction began on a new Lower School and later grew to include a Middle and Upper School. In 2001, Mount Pisgah began offering a high school education. Additional expansions included a new education building, Geier Hall. As of 2015, the school includes a preschool, with both full- and half-day programs, and junior kindergarten through 12th grade.

== Location ==
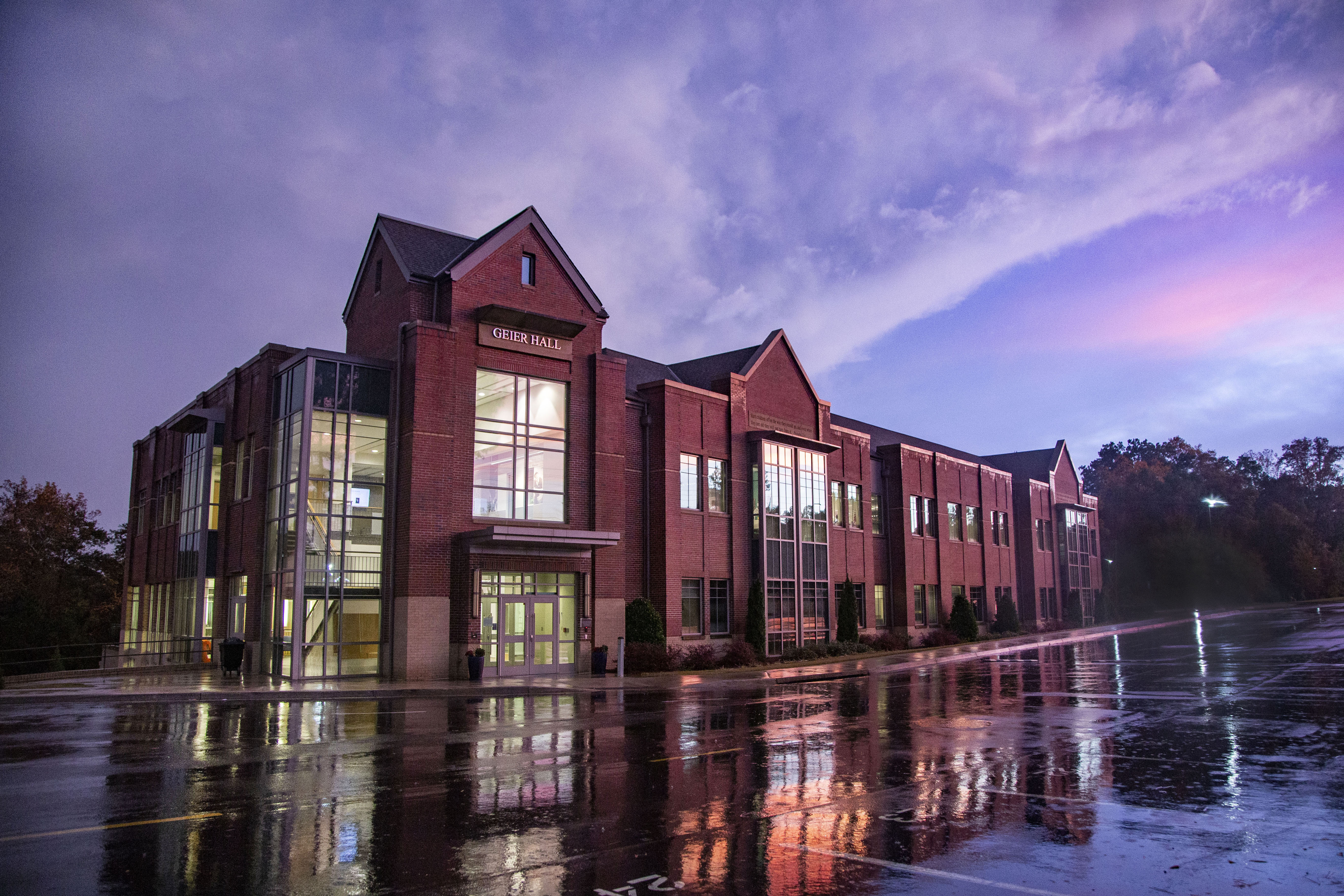
The newest building on Mount Pisgah's East Campus, Geier Hall.

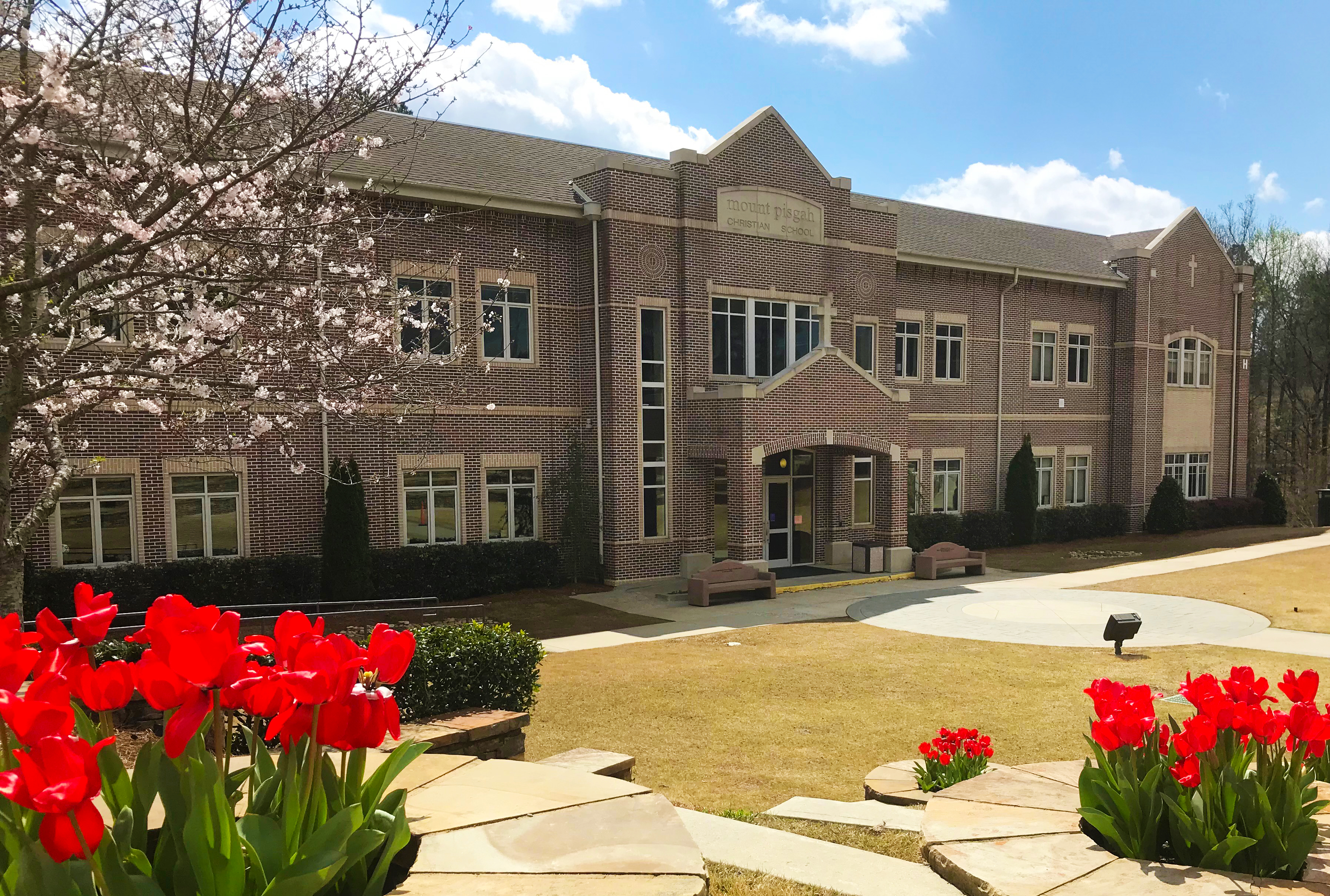
The H Building, next door to Geier Hall.

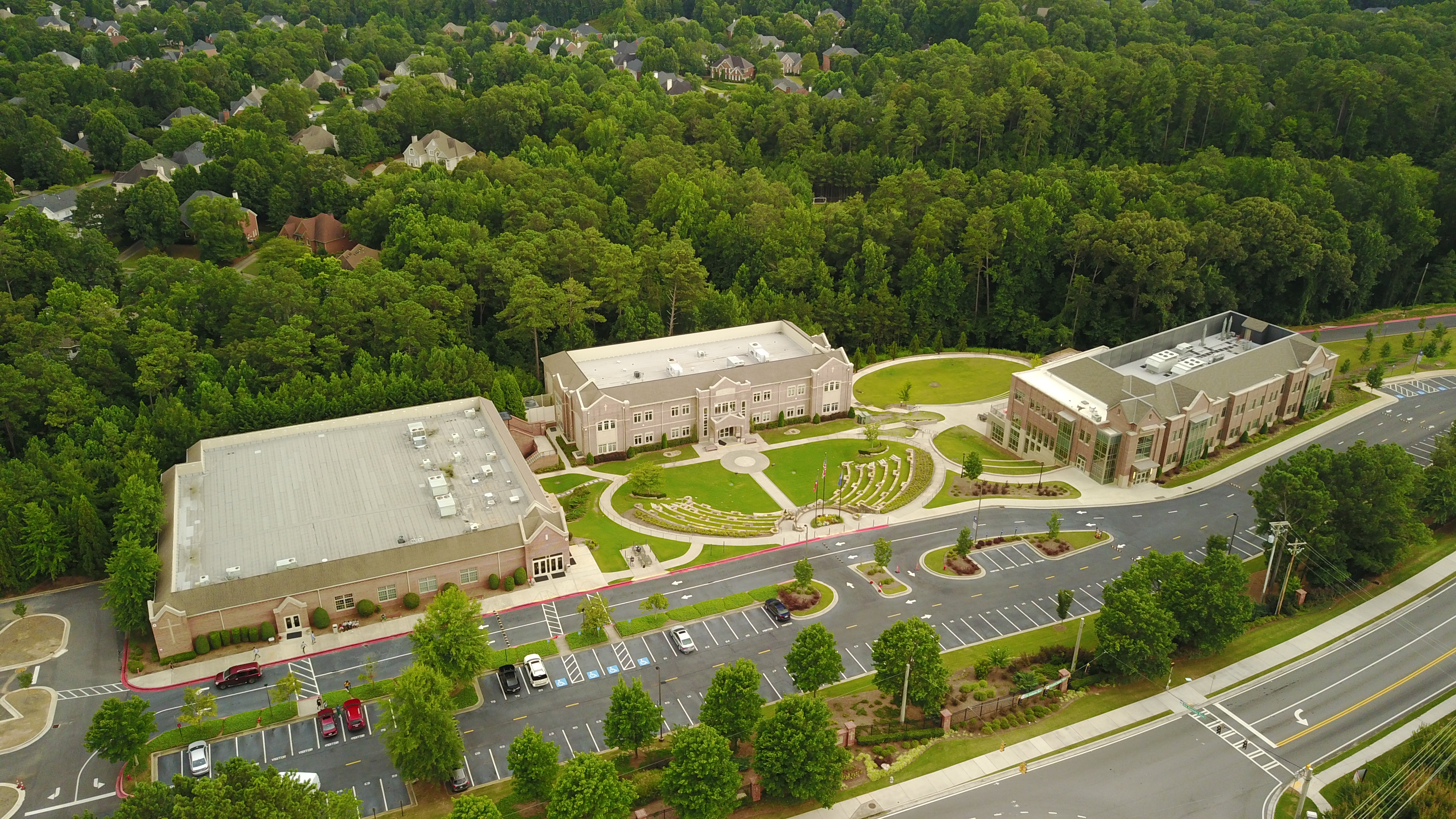
Aerial view of the East Campus including the Drummond Center (left), H Building (center) and Geier Hall (right). The South Campus is directly across the street.

Mount Pisgah Christian School includes three campuses, located at the major intersection of Old Alabama and Nesbit Ferry Roads in Johns Creek, Georgia, plus the Patriot Athletic Campus on Brumbelow Road.

The school's address is: 9875 Nesbit Ferry Road, Johns Creek, Georgia 30022

== Academics ==
Mount Pisgah Christian School's main academic goal is to prepare students for college. They serve students from age six weeks through 12th grade.

They offer AP classes in art, biology, chemistry, English, government, history, math, and foreign language. Recent graduates were accepted to the nation's top universities including Princeton, Cornell, Dartmouth, Georgia Tech, Wake Forest, and more. Students are required to complete 23 academic credits in the Upper School to graduate. 94% of Mount Pisgah graduates were accepted to their college of first choice.

Organizations and clubs include Habitat for Humanity, Future Business Leaders of America, Student Government, Robotics and more.

== Fine arts ==
Mount Pisgah Christian School offers fine arts for the elementary, middle, and high school. Specifically, the high school offers art, chorus, digital imaging, chapel band, yearbook, media production, and web design.

== Athletics ==
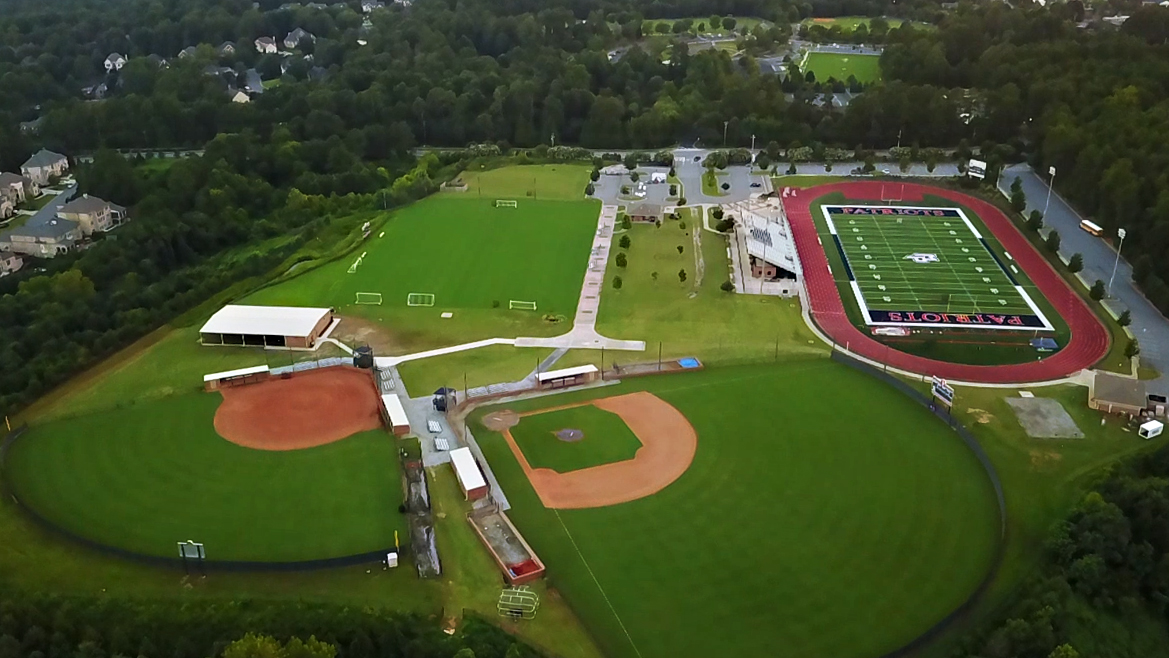
The Patriot Athletic Campus, half a mile from East Campus.

Mount Pisgah Christian Patriots participates in athletics at all levels, but for the high school, they compete in the Georgia High School Association, also known as the GHSA. Mount Pisgah Christian has been in the GHSA for over ten years. Mount Pisgah's wrestling team is their most historically dominant, as they won state dual titles in 2021 and 2023, along with winning the traditional state title in 2021. The wrestling team has also had several individual state champions. Mount Pisgah offers high school baseball, boys' and girls' basketball, cheerleading, cross country, football, wrestling, golf, softball, boys' and girls' soccer, boys' and girls' tennis, track and field, volleyball and lacrosse.

The school also has a middle school equestrian team and an upper school varsity equestrian team. These teams are both part of the national Interscholastic Equestrian Association (IEA).

This is where current Arlington Renegades player Kyle Sloter attended high school.
