= Anree Saint-Amour =

American football player

No. 94
- Position: Defensive end

Personal information
- Born: September 18, 1996 (age 30); Suwanee, Georgia, U.S.
- Listed height: 6 ft 3 in (1.91 m)
- Listed weight: 260 lb (118 kg)

Career information
- High school: North Gwinnett (Suwanee, Georgia)
- College: Georgia Tech (2015–2018)
- NFL draft: 2019: undrafted

Career history
- Minnesota Vikings (2019)*; BC Lions (2021)*; TSL Conquerors (2021); New Orleans Breakers (2022–2023); Birmingham Stallions (2024)*; Arlington Renegades (2024)
- * Offseason or practice squad member only

Andree Saint-Amour (born March 20, 1996) is an American former football defensive end. He played college football at Georgia Tech. He began his professional career in the National Football League as an undrafted free agent in 2019 with the Minnesota Vikings. He also signed a deal in the Canadian Football League (CFL) with the BC Lions.

== Early life ==
Saint-Amour was born in 1996 in Suwanee, Georgia, as one of three children to Manfred and Renise Saint-Amour. Saint-Amour's older brother Manrey, played as an offensive lineman for Georgia Southern. While at North Gwinnett, Saint-Amour was team captain during his senior year and was named All-State and All-Region. He also earned a letter which he signed for Georgia Tech after declining offers from Iowa, Michigan State, Minnesota, and Stanford.

== College career ==
During his true freshman year in 2015, Saint-Amour played 8 out of 13 games. He finished his first season with 8 tackles. He played as a defensive end during his sophomore season in all 13 games. He remained a defensive end throughout the remainder of his college seasons. While at Georgia Tech, Saint-Amour majored in business administration.

== Professional career ==
Pre-draft measurables
Height	Weight	Arm length	Hand span	40-yard dash	10-yard split	20-yard split	Vertical jump	Broad jump	Bench press
6 ft 1 7/8 in (1.88 m)	258 lb (117 kg)	32 1/4 in (0.82 m)	9 1/2 in (0.24 m)	4.78 s	1.63 s	2.70 s	35.0 in (0.89 m)	10 ft 2 in (3.10 m)	26 reps
All values from Pro Day

=== Minnesota Vikings ===
It was reported on April 27, 2019, that Saint-Amour signed with the Minnesota Vikings after going undrafted in the 2019 NFL draft.

=== BC Lions ===
During September 2019, Saint-Amour signed with the BC Lions of the Canadian Football League (CFL).

=== The Spring League ===
Saint-Amour was a member of the TSL Conquerors.

=== New Orleans Breakers ===
Saint-Amour was selected in the third round of the 2022 USFL draft by the New Orleans Breakers of the United States Football League (USFL). He was signed originally as an offensive tackle before being assigned to defensive end. He re-signed with the Breakers on September 20, 2023. The Breakers folded when the XFL and USFL merged to create the United Football League (UFL).

=== Birmingham Stallions ===
On January 5, 2024, Saint-Amour was selected by the Birmingham Stallions of the United Football League (UFL) during the 2024 UFL dispersal draft. He was waived on March 22, 2024.

=== Arlington Renegades ===
On April 11, 2024, Saint-Amour was signed by the Arlington Renegades of the United Football League (UFL).
