= Jonathan Adams (American football) =

American football player (born 1999)

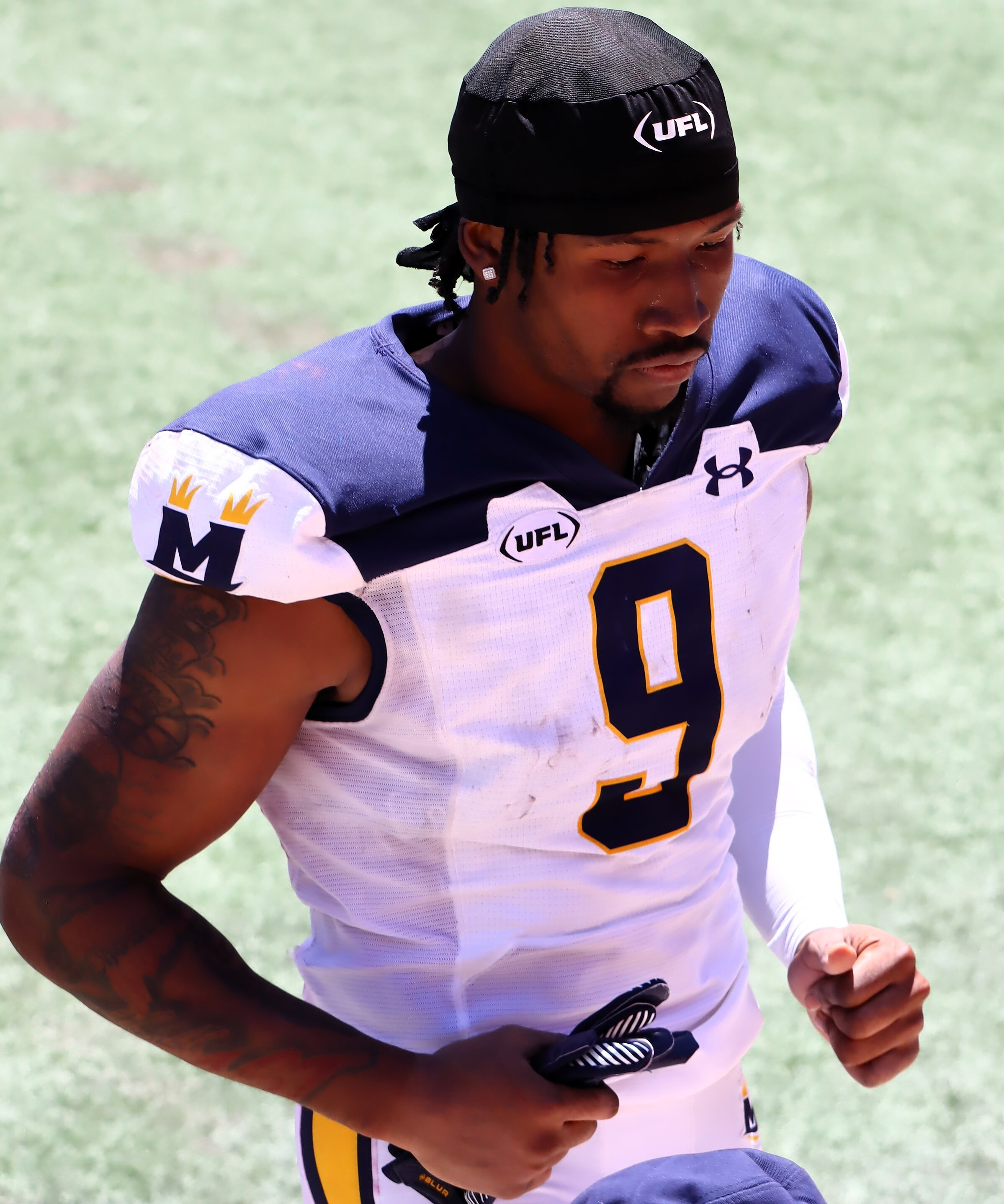
- Adams in 2025

No. 9 – Louisville Kings
- Position: Wide receiver
- Roster status: Injured reserve

Personal information
- Born: January 21, 1999 (age 27); Jonesboro, Arkansas, U.S.
- Listed height: 6 ft 3 in (1.91 m)
- Listed weight: 246 lb (112 kg)

Career information
- High school: Jonesboro
- College: Arkansas State (2017–2020)
- NFL draft: 2021: undrafted

Career history
- Detroit Lions (2021)*; New Orleans Breakers (2022–2023); Memphis Showboats (2024–2025); Louisville Kings (2026–present)
- * Offseason or practice squad member only

Awards and highlights
- UFL champion (2026); Sun Belt Offensive Player of the Year (2020); First-team All-Sun Belt (2020)
- Stats at Pro Football Reference

Jonathan Adams Jr. (born January 21, 1999) is an American football wide receiver for the Louisville Kings of the United Football League (UFL). He played college football for the Arkansas State Red Wolves and was signed by the Detroit Lions as an undrafted free agent after the 2021 NFL draft. He has also played for the New Orleans Breakers of the United States Football League (USFL).

== High school ==
Adams was a four-year letterer and starter at Jonesboro High School in Jonesboro, Arkansas. In his final two years alone, Adams caught 139 passes for 2,633 yards and 45 touchdowns. He was named Arkansas 6A Player of the Year as a senior. A two-star recruit, Adams was lightly recruited and accepted a scholarship offer from his hometown college of Arkansas State University, over offers from Air Force, Central Arkansas, and Missouri State, and walk-on offers from Arkansas and Arkansas-Pine Bluff. He also earned all-state honors in basketball.

== College career ==
Arriving at Arkansas State, Adams appeared in nearly every game as a freshman and sophomore but was primarily a backup, catching 25 passes for 344 yards for four touchdowns across his first two seasons. Adams missed most of his junior year to instead focus on basketball, playing in four games and starting in one, catching 77 yards and a touchdown on the season.

As a senior, Adams caught 75 passes for 1,111 yards and 15 touchdowns. In the season's second game, Adams helped upset the favored Kansas State by catching 8 passes for 98 yards and three touchdowns, securing a 35–31 win over the Wildcats. He was named the 247Sports Player Of The Week twice, the 2020 Sun Belt Player of the Year, and a finalist for the Biletnikoff Award. He also played on the Red Wolves basketball team until his senior year.

== Professional career ==
Pre-draft measurables
Height	Weight	Arm length	Hand span	Wingspan	40-yard dash	10-yard split	20-yard split	20-yard shuttle	Three-cone drill	Vertical jump	Broad jump
6 ft 2 in (1.88 m)	210 lb (95 kg)	32 1/8 in (0.82 m)	9 7/8 in (0.25 m)	6 ft 7 1/2 in (2.02 m)	4.59 s	1.56 s	2.70 s	4.38 s	7.04 s	39.0 in (0.99 m)	11 ft 0 in (3.35 m)
All values from NFL Combine/Pro Day

=== Detroit Lions ===
After going undrafted, Adams was invited to the Detroit Lions' training camp in April 2021 and was signed to the team on May 1. Despite making a "fairly impressive showing" during summer camps Adams was cut on August 20. On September 10, 2021, Adams was suspended from the league for six weeks due to an undisclosed violation.

=== New Orleans Breakers ===
Adams was drafted the 15th round of the 2022 USFL draft by the New Orleans Breakers of the United States Football League (USFL). In the 2022 season, Adams caught 31 passes for 406 yards and five touchdowns, finishing fifth in the league for receiving yards for the season. He re-signed with the Breakers on September 20, 2023. The Breakers folded when the XFL and USFL merged to create the United Football League (UFL).

=== Memphis Showboats ===
Adams was selected during the 2024 UFL dispersal draft by the Memphis Showboats on January 5, 2024. He re-signed with the Showboats on August 26, 2024.

=== Louisville Kings ===
On January 12, 2026, Adams was allocated to the Louisville Kings of the United Football League (UFL).

== Career statistics ==
Legend
**Bold**	Career high

=== Regular season ===
Year	Team	League	Games		Receiving				
Year	Team	League	GP	GS	Rec	Yds	Avg	Lng	TD
2022	NO	USFL	**10**	9	31	406	13.1	29	**3**
2023	NO	USFL	**10**	**10**	**41**	**511**	12.5	41	2
2024	MEM	UFL	**10**	**10**	33	441	13.4	**48**	1
2025	MEM	UFL	10	9	34	443	**13.0**	39	2
Career			40	38	139	1,801	13.0	48	8

=== Postseason ===
Year	Team	League	Games		Receiving				
Year	Team	League	GP	GS	Rec	Yds	Avg	Lng	TD
2022	NO	USFL	1	1	2	25	12.5	14	0
2023	NO	USFL	1	1	4	47	11.8	22	1
Career			2	2	6	72	12.0	22	1
