= Inside Carolina =

Independent web site for the University of North Carolina athletics

- Editor: Ben Sherman
- Categories: Sports magazine
- Founded: 1994
- Country: United States
- Based in: Chapel Hill, North Carolina
- Language: English
- Website: insidecarolina.com

Inside Carolina is an independent web site devoted to the University of North Carolina athletics. The site covers North Carolina football, men's basketball, baseball and recruiting. Its staff is composed of professional journalists who provide its readers with coverage of Tar Heel sports and recruiting. It features game reports, commentary, news, photography, and video clips. All content is original to the Inside Carolina staff of journalists or the ON3 network.

Inside Carolina magazine was founded by David Eckoff in early 1994 as a monthly magazine. Later that year, Eckoff added a web site to go along with the print publication. Some of the early writers for IC included Darcy Miller, Bob Heymann, Darrell Lucus, Adam Lucas, Thad Williamson, Andrew Jones and Michelle Donahue Hillison. Eckoff sold the publication to TheTarPit owner Buck Sanders in late 2000, and Sanders merged it with UNCBasketball.com (named by the November 27, 2000 edition of ESPN Magazine as the top college hoops site) in 2001. Ben Sherman, creator of UNCBasketball.com, now serves as editor in chief of the website. The editorial staff includes Tommy Ashley, Michelle Hillison and Greg Barnes as well as photographer Jim Hawkins. The publication is fully credentialed by UNC, the ACC and the NCAA.

== Message boards ==
Inside Carolina is well known among sports fans and journalists for its message boards. On these boards, Carolina fans discuss the various college teams, as well as discussing general topics such as politics and campus life.

The boards have also had a host of athletes, their parents, coaches and other figures in the world of high school recruiting posting on them.

Each message board branch has a respective Premium version, available to paid subscribers of the IC website. The various message boards include UNC Basketball, UNC Baseball and other UNC Sports, and the UNC Ticket Exchange. In addition to this is The Tar Pit, designated for UNC Football discussion, and the ZiggaZoomba Lounge, an off-topic board for discussions not relating to UNC Sports. The message boards themselves are moderated by staff and volunteers.
