= Johnnie Dixon (wide receiver) =

American football player (born 1994)

No. 1, 2
- Position: Wide receiver

Personal information
- Born: September 16, 1994 (age 32); West Palm Beach, Florida, U.S.
- Listed height: 5 ft 11 in (1.80 m)
- Listed weight: 200 lb (91 kg)

Career information
- High school: Dwyer (Palm Beach Gardens, Florida)
- College: Ohio State
- NFL draft: 2019: undrafted

Career history
- Houston Texans (2019)*; Arizona Cardinals (2019–2020)*; Dallas Cowboys (2021)*; New Orleans Breakers (2022–2023)
- * Offseason or practice squad member only

Awards and highlights
- CFP national champion (2014)
- Stats at Pro Football Reference

Johnnie L. Dixon (born September 16, 1994) is an American former professional football wide receiver. He played college football at Ohio State and was signed as an undrafted free agent by the Houston Texans after the 2019 NFL draft.

== College career ==
Dixon was ranked as a four–star recruit by 247Sports.com coming out of high school. He committed to Ohio State on December 17, 2013.

== Professional career ==
Pre-draft measurables
| Height | Weight | Arm length | Hand span | Wingspan | 40-yard dash | 10-yard split | 20-yard split | 20-yard shuttle | Three-cone drill | Vertical jump | Broad jump | Bench press |
|---|---|---|---|---|---|---|---|---|---|---|---|---|
| 5 ft 10 3/8 in (1.79 m) | 201 lb (91 kg) | 30 1/4 in (0.77 m) | 9 5/8 in (0.24 m) | 6 ft 0 1/2 in (1.84 m) | 4.41 s | 1.57 s | 2.60 s | 4.38 s | 7.38 s | 37.5 in (0.95 m) | 10 ft 0 in (3.05 m) | 16 reps |
All values from NFL Combine/Pro Day

=== Houston Texans ===
Dixon signed with the Houston Texans as an undrafted free agent after the 2019 NFL draft. Dixon was released as the Texans made final roster cuts before the regular season on August 31, 2019.

=== Arizona Cardinals ===
On September 3, 2019, Dixon was signed to the practice squad of the Arizona Cardinals. He spent the entire season on the practice squad and was signed to a future/reserve contract on December 30, 2019. He was placed on injured reserve on September 6, 2020, and was waived/injured the next day.

=== Dallas Cowboys ===
Dixon signed with the Dallas Cowboys on May 25, 2021. He was waived on August 31, 2021.

=== New Orleans Breakers ===
Dixon was selected in the 14th round of the 2022 USFL draft by the New Orleans Breakers. He was named a starter at wide receiver, leading the team in both receptions and receiving touchdowns, registering 37 receptions for 359 yards and 4 touchdowns. He was voted the Week 3 USFL Offensive Player of the Week. He became a free agent after the 2023 season.
