= Vontae Diggs =

Canadian football player (born 1995)

Profile
- Position: Linebacker

Personal information
- Born: November 7, 1995 (age 30); Downers Grove, Illinois, U.S.
- Listed height: 6 ft 2 in (1.88 m)
- Listed weight: 230 lb (104 kg)

Career information
- High school: North (Downers Grove, Illinois)
- College: UConn
- NFL draft: 2018: undrafted

Career history
- Washington Redskins (2018)*; Atlanta Legends (2019); Columbus Destroyers (2019)*; Edmonton Eskimos/Football Team (2019–2020); Toronto Argonauts (2021)*; New Orleans Breakers (2022–2023); Memphis Showboats (2024)
- * Offseason or practice squad member only

Career spring football statistics as of 2024
- Total tackles: 156
- Sacks: 5
- Fumble recoveries: 0
- Interceptions: 4
- Stats at CFL.ca

Vontae Diggs (born November 7, 1995) is an American professional football linebacker. He played college football at Connecticut.

== Personal life ==
Diggs grew up in Downers Grove, Illinois, and went to Downers Grove North High School.

== College career ==
Diggs played all 48 games for the UConn Huskies in his collegiate career. Diggs tallied 77 tackles and 3.5 tackles for loss in his senior season.

== Professional career ==
He tried out with the Washington Redskins after graduating from the University of Connecticut.

Diggs has played in five different football leagues, including the AAF and Arena Football League. Most notably, Diggs spent two years with the Edmonton Elks in the Canadian Football League where he won the team's "Most Outstanding Rookie" award in 2019. He was released by the Eskimos in 2020 and signed with the Toronto Argonauts. In October 2021 he was released by the Argonauts.

Diggs signed with the New Orleans Breakers of the USFL on September 28, 2023. The Breakers folded when the XFL and USFL merged to create the United Football League (UFL). He was selected by the Memphis Showboats during the 2024 UFL dispersal draft on January 5, 2024.
