= New Orleans Breakers (2022) =

Football team in New Orleans, Louisiana

Logo

General information
- Founded: 2022
- Folded: 2023
- Headquartered: Protective Stadium in Birmingham, Alabama
- Colors: Royal blue, Breaker blue, silver, white
- Mascot: Dave the Wave

Personnel
- Owner: Fox Corporation
- General manager: Carlos Alvarado (2023)
- Head coach: Larry Fedora (2022); John DeFilippo (2023)

Team history
- New Orleans Breakers (2022–2023)

Home fields
- Legion Field (2022); Protective Stadium (2022–2023)

League / conference affiliations
- United States Football League (2022–2023): South Division (2022–2023)

Playoff appearances (2)
- 2022, 2023

The New Orleans Breakers were a professional American football team based in New Orleans, Louisiana. The Breakers competed in the United States Football League (USFL) as a member of the league's South division.

As with the majority of the revived USFL's teams, the Breakers did not play in the metropolitan area of the city whose name they bear; they instead shared Protective Stadium with the Birmingham Stallions. It was not among the teams included in the USFL's merger into the United Football League, though the UFL would later revive the name with the Rhode Island Breakers.

== History ==
The New Orleans Breakers were one of eight teams that were officially announced as a USFL franchise on The Herd with Colin Cowherd on November 22, 2021.

On January 27, 2022, it was announced on The Herd with Colin Cowherd that former NCAA Head coach Larry Fedora was named the Head coach and General manager of the Breakers. Fedora would go on to lead the Breakers to a 6–4 regular season record, clinching a playoff spot following their Week 9 victory over Tampa Bay Bandits. The Breakers would lose in the divisional championship game to the Birmingham Stallions 17–31. Following the season, Fedora stepped down as the head coach of the Breakers, citing wanting to spend more time with his family and an unwillingness to coach a team that did not play any true home games.

On November 10, 2022, the Breakers announced that they had named John DeFilippo as their second head coach.

The league had been in contact with the Shrine on Airline, a converted baseball park in suburban Metairie, Louisiana, about future use of that stadium for the team. This never materialized, and on December 19, 2023, the USFL informed its players union that the Breakers would be among four USFL teams to be contracted as part of the league's upcoming merger with the XFL.

== Coach history ==
=== Head coach history ===
#	Name	Term	Regular season				Playoffs			Awards
#	Name	Term	GC	W	L	Win %	GC	W	L	Awards
New Orleans Breakers
1	Larry Fedora	2022	10	6	4	.600	1	0	1	
2	John DeFilippo	2023	10	7	3	.700	1	0	1	

=== Offensive coordinator history ===
#	Name	Term	Regular season				Playoffs			Awards
#	Name	Term	GC	W	L	Win %	GC	W	L	Awards
New Orleans Breakers
1	Noel Mazzone	2022	10	6	4	.600	1	0	1	
2	Doug Martin	2023	10	7	3	.700	1	0	1	

=== Defensive coordinator history ===
#	Name	Term	Regular season				Playoffs			Awards
#	Name	Term	GC	W	L	Win %	GC	W	L	Awards
New Orleans Breakers
1	Jon Tenuta	2022-2023	20	13	7	.650	2	0	2	

== Records ==
All-time Breakers leaders
Leader	Player	Record	Years with Breakers
Passing yards	McLeod Bethel-Thompson	2,433 passing yards	2023
Passing Touchdowns	McLeod Bethel-Thompson	14 passing touchdowns	2023
Rushing yards	Wes Hills	679 rushing yards	2023
Rushing Touchdowns	Wes Hills	10 touchdowns	2023
Receiving yards	Jonathan Adams	883 receiving yards	2022–2023
Receiving Touchdowns	Johnnie Dixon	9 receiving touchdowns	2022-2023
Receptions	Jonathan Adams	71 receptions	2022-2023
Tackles	Jerod Fernandez	151 tackles	2022-2023
Sacks	Anree Saint-Amour	8.0 sacks	2022–2023
Interceptions	Vontae Diggs	3 interceptions	2022–2023
Coaching wins	John DeFilippo	7 wins	2023

== Statistics and records ==
=== Season-by-season record ===
Note: The finish, wins, losses, and ties columns list regular season results and exclude any postseason play.

Legend
USFL champions^{†}	Division champions^{^}	Wild Card berth^{#}

New Orleans Breakers season-by-season records
Season	Team	League	Division	Regular season					Postseason results	Awards
Season	Team	League	Division	Finish	Wins	Losses	Ties	Pct	Postseason results	Awards
2022	2022	USFL	South	2nd^{#}	6	4	0	.600	Lost Division finals (Stallions) 17–31	–
2023	2023	USFL	South	2nd^{#}	7	3	0	.700	Lost Division finals (Stallions) 22–47	–
Totals					13	7	0	.650	(2022–2023, regular season)	
Totals					0	2	—	.000	(2022–2023, playoffs)	
Totals					13	9	0	.591	(2022–2023, regular season and playoffs)	

=== Rivalries ===
==== Breaker Bay Brawl ====
The New Orleans Breakers previously shared a rivalry with the Tampa Bay Bandits called the Breaker Bay Brawl. The rivalry only lasted one season as it was announced on November 15, 2022, that the Tampa Bay Bandits would be replaced by the Memphis Showboats. The Breakers finished with a 2–0 record against Tampa Bay.

==== Franchise matchup history ====
Team	Record	Pct.
Michigan Panthers	2–0	1.000
Pittsburgh Maulers	2–0	1.000
Tampa Bay Bandits	2–0	1.000
Houston Gamblers	3–1	.750
Memphis Showboats	1–1	.500
New Jersey Generals	1–1	.500
Philadelphia Stars	1–1	.500
Birmingham Stallions	1–5	.166
