= 2023 Vegas Vipers season =

American professional football season

- Owner: Alpha Acquico, LLC
- General manager: Rod Woodson
- Head coach: Rod Woodson
- Home stadium: Cashman Field

Results
- Record: 2–8
- Division place: 4th XFL North
- Playoffs: Did not qualify

The 2023 Vegas Vipers season was the second season for the Vegas Vipers as a professional American football franchise. They played as charter members of the XFL, one of eight teams to compete in the league for the 2023 season. The Vipers played their home games at the Cashman Field and were led by head coach Rod Woodson.

The franchise relocated from Tampa, Florida to Las Vegas, Nevada prior to the season, changing the team's name from Tampa Bay Vipers to Vegas Vipers.

On January 1, 2024, it was announced that the 2023 season was the last season for the Vipers.

== Roster ==
2023 Vegas Vipers final roster
Quarterbacks: 12 D'Angelo Fulford; 2 Brett Hundley; 3 Jalan McClendon; Running backs: 18 Brian Burt; 8 John Lovett; 32 Shai McKenzie; 15 Rod Smith; Wide receivers: 19 Geronimo Allison; 13 Jeff Badet; 82 Saeed Blacknall; 4 Martavis Bryant; 10 Mathew Sexton; 14 Cinque Sweeting; Tight ends: 86 Brandon Dillon; 16 Travis Koontz; 80 Sean Price; 89 Cam Sutton	Offensive linemen: 70 Chad Broome-Webster T; 79 Daishawn Dixon G; 77 Quinterrius Eatmon T; 66 Fernando Frye G; 75 Jovann Letuli T; 64 Michael Miller G; 61 Dohnovan West C; 71 Isaiah Williams G; 56 Larry Williams T; Defensive linemen: 95 Bryant Jones DT; 90 Jah'Sheem Martin DT; 96 Kelvin Pinkney DT; 97 La'Ron Stokes DE; 99 Destiny Vaeao DE; 98 Cavon Walker DE	Linebackers: 28 C. J. Avery ILB; 44 Vic Beasley OLB; 48 D. J. Calhoun ILB; 20 Jawuan Johnson ILB; 23 Max Roberts OLB; 45 Martrell Spaight ILB; 0 Pita Taumoepenu OLB; Defensive backs: 24 Will Adams CB; 9 Deontay Anderson SS; 25 Marwin Evans FS; 6 Keylon Kennedy CB; 21 Antonio Phillips CB; 30 Stephen Roberts SS; 26 Maurice Smith SS; 22 Adam Sparks CB; 31 Jamar Summers CB; Special teams: 17 Michael Carrizosa P; 40 Adam Higuera LS; 38 Sam Sloman K	Reserve lists: 50 Tony Adams C/G (IR); 11 Paul Dawson OLB (IR); 65 Jamil Demby T/G (IR); 43 Luke Holloway ILB (IR); 33 Kevin McGill CB (IR); 69 Kahlil McKenzie C (IR); 5 DeAndre Torrey RB (IR); 88 Robert Windsor DE (IR); 51 active, 8 inactive

== Schedule ==
All times Pacific

Week	Day	Date	Kickoff	TV	Opponent	Results		Location	Attendance
Week	Day	Date	Kickoff	TV	Opponent	Score	Record	Location	Attendance
1	Saturday	February 18	12:00 p.m.	ABC	at Arlington Renegades	20–22	0–1	Choctaw Stadium	12,047
2	Saturday	February 25	4:00 p.m.	FX	DC Defenders	6–18	0–2	Cashman Field	6,023
3	Saturday	March 4	4:00 p.m.	FX	Seattle Sea Dragons	26–30	0–3	Cashman Field	6,037
4	Sunday	March 12	4:00 p.m.	ESPN2	at DC Defenders	18–32	0–4	Audi Field	11,521
5	Saturday	March 18	7:00 p.m.	FX	Orlando Guardians	35–32	1–4	Cashman Field	6,008
6	Saturday	March 25	4:00 p.m.	FX	St. Louis BattleHawks	6–29	1–5	Cashman Field	6,033
7	Saturday	April 1	12:00 p.m.	ESPN2	San Antonio Brahmas	26–12	2–5	Cashman Field	6,041
8	Saturday	April 8	10:00 a.m.	ESPN	at St. Louis BattleHawks	17–21 (OT)	2–6	The Dome at America's Center	35,167
9	Saturday	April 15	9:30 a.m.	ABC	at Houston Roughnecks	21–28	2–7	TDECU Stadium	10,967
10	Sunday	April 23	4:00 p.m.	ESPN2	at Seattle Sea Dragons	9–28	2–8	Lumen Field	15,046

=== Game summaries ===
==== Week 1: at Arlington Renegades ====
Week 1: Vegas Vipers at Arlington Renegades – Game summary

Quarter	1	2	3	4	Total
Vipers	6	8	0	6	20
Renegades	3	0	12	7	22

at Choctaw Stadium, Arlington, Texas

- Date: February 18
- Game time: 12:00 p.m. PDT
- Game weather: 51 °F (11 °C)
- Game attendance: 12,047
- Referee: Mike Vandervelde
- TV announcers (ABC): Tom Hart, Greg McElroy, Cole Cubelic and Katie George

Game information

First quarter

- VGS – Jeff Badet 5-yard pass from Luis Perez (2-pt Conversion No Good), 8:18. Vipers 6-0. Drive: 12 plays, 69 yards, 6:44.
- ARL – Taylor Russolino 38-yard field goal, 1:29. Vipers 6-3. Drive: 12 plays, 55 yards, 6:47.

Second quarter

- VGS – Jeff Badet 39-yard pass from Luis Perez (2-pt Conversion Good to Brandon Dillon), 4:43. Vipers 14-3. Drive: 5 plays, 65 yards, 2:18.

Third quarter

- ARL – Tomasi Laulile 22-yard interception return (2-pt Conversion No Good), 9:23. Vipers 14-9. Drive: 1 play, 22 yards, 0:04.
- ARL – Taylor Russolino 32-yard field goal, 6:47. Vipers 14-12. Drive: 5 plays, 26 yards, 2:19.
- ARL – Taylor Russolino 25-yard field goal, 2:43. Renegades 15-14. Drive: 5 plays, 28 yards, 2:17.

Fourth quarter

- ARL – De'Vante Bausby 6-yard interception return (1-pt Conversion Good by De'Veon Smith 1-yard rush, 4:06. Renegades 22-14. Drive: 1 play, 1 yard, 0:01.
- VGS – Cinque Sweeting 20-yard pass from Luis Perez (2-pt Conversion No Good), 0:12. Renegades 22-20. Drive: 5 plays, 60 yards, 0:47.

Top passers

- VGS – Luis Perez – 22/36, 249 yards, 3 TD, 2 INT
- ARL – Drew Plitt – 19/25, 172 yards, 1 INT

Top rushers

- VGS – John Lovett – 4 rushes, 10 yards
- ARL – De'Veon Smith – 15 rushes, 42 yards

Top receivers

- VGS – Jeff Badet – 6 receptions, 81 yards, 2 TD
- ARL – Sal Cannella – 7 receptions, 70 yards

==== Week 2: vs DC Defenders ====
Week 2: DC Defenders at Vegas Vipers – Game summary

Quarter	1	2	3	4	Total
Defenders	0	0	3	15	18
Vipers	6	0	0	0	6

at Cashman Field, Las Vegas, Nevada

- Date: February 25
- Game time: 4:00 p.m. PDT
- Game weather: 56 °F (13 °C)
- Game attendance: 6,023
- Referee: Jason Autrey
- TV announcers (FX): John Schriffen, Tom Luginbill, Harry Douglas and Stormy Buonantony

Game information

First quarter

- VGS – DeAndre Torrey 2-yard rush (2-pt Conversion No Good), 12:10. Vipers 6–0. Drive: 1 play, 98 yards, 0:04.

Second quarter

- No scoring plays.

Third quarter

- DC – Matt McCrane 47-yard field goal, 9:41. Vipers 6–3. Drive: 11 plays, 42 yards, 5:19.

Fourth quarter

- DC – D'Eriq King 12-yard rush (1-pt Conversion Good by D'Eriq King), 14:58. Defenders 10–6. Drive: 10 plays, 80 yards, 4:21.
- DC – Abram Smith 9-yard rush (2-pt Conversion Good by Ethan Wolf), 8:43. Defenders 18–6. Drive: 5 plays, 44 yards, 2:16.

Top passers

- DC – Jordan Ta'amu – 11/23, 93 yards
- VGS – Brett Hundley – 11/18, 98 yards

Top rushers

- DC – Abram Smith – 15 rushes, 71 yards
- VGS – Rod Smith – 6 rushes, 39 yards

Top receivers

- DC – Josh Hammond – 3 receptions, 24 yards
- VGS – John Lovett – 2 receptions, 33 yards

==== Week 3: vs Seattle Sea Dragons ====
Week 3: Seattle Sea Dragons at Vegas Vipers – Game summary

Quarter	1	2	3	4	Total
Sea Dragons	6	3	6	15	30
Vipers	6	3	11	6	26

at Cashman Field, Las Vegas, Nevada

- Date: March 4
- Game time: 4:00 p.m. PDT
- Game weather: 64 °F (18 °C)
- Game attendance: 6,037
- Referee: Reggie Smith
- TV announcers (FX): Matt Barrie, Joey Galloway, Eric Mac Lain and Tiffany Blackmon

Game information

First quarter

- VGS – Jeff Badet 12-yard pass from Brett Hundley (2-pt Conversion No Good), 10:20. Vipers 6–0. Drive: 6 Plays, 25 Yards, 2:40.
- SEA – Blake Jackson 26-yard pass from Ben DiNucci (3-pt Conversion No Good), 1:32. Tied 6–6. Drive: 7 Plays, 91 Yards, 3:47.

Second quarter

- VGS – Bailey Giffen 39-yard field goal, 7:38. Vipers 9–6. Drive: 8 Plays, 53 Yards, 4:11.
- SEA – Dominik Eberle 34-yard field goal, 1:55. Tied 9–9. Drive: 6 Plays, 49 Yards, 2:10.

Third quarter

- VGS – Brett Hundley 6-yard rush (2-pt Conversion Good by Martavis Bryant), 12:06. Vipers 17–9. Drive: 6 Plays, 75 Yards, 2:54.
- VGS – Bailey Giffen 47-yard field goal, 6:24. Vipers 20–9. Drive: 8 Plays, 30 Yards, 3:18.
- SEA – Josh Gordon 16-yard pass from Ben DiNucci (3-pt Conversion No Good), 1:17. Vipers 20–15. Drive: 9 Plays, 82 Yards, 5:07.

Fourth quarter

- SEA – Dominik Eberle 32-yard field goal, 7:06. Vipers 20–18. Drive: 10 Plays, 55 Yards, 5:28.
- VGS – John Lovett 50-yard pass from Brett Hundley (2-pt Conversion No Good), 6:45. Vipers 26–18. Drive: 1 Play, 50 Yards, 0:21.
- SEA – Juwan Green 22-yard pass from Ben DiNucci (3-pt Conversion No Good), 3:36. Vipers 26–24. Drive: 6 Plays, 73 Yards, 3:09.
- SEA – Josh Gordon 65-yard pass from Ben DiNucci (3-pt Conversion No Good), 1:00. Sea Dragons 30–26. Drive: 4 Plays, 73 Yards, 0:43.

Top passers

- SEA – Ben DiNucci – 29/37, 377 yards, 4 TD
- VGS – Brett Hundley – 13/28, 224 yards, 2 TD

Top rushers

- SEA – Morgan Ellison – 17 rushes, 103 yards
- VGS – Rod Smith – 10 rushes, 41 yards

Top receivers

- SEA – Jahcour Pearson – 7 receptions, 99 yards
- VGS – Jeff Badet – 4 receptions, 93 yards

==== Week 4: at DC Defenders ====
Week 4: Vegas Vipers at DC Defenders – Game summary

Quarter	1	2	3	4	Total
Vipers	3	3	0	12	18
Defenders	6	8	6	12	32

at Audi Field, Washington, DC

- Date: March 12
- Game time: 4:00 p.m. PDT
- Game weather: 40 °F (4 °C)
- Game attendance: 11,521
- Referee: Jeff Heaser
- TV announcers (ESPN2): Matt Barrie, Joey Galloway, Eric Mac Lain and Tiffany Blackmon

Game information

First quarter

- DC – D'Eriq King 5-yard rush (2-pt Conversion No Good), 13:11. Defenders 6–0. Drive: 4 Plays, 21 Yards, 1:35.
- VGS – Bailey Giffen 37-yard field goal, 0:50. Defenders 6–3. Drive: 6 Plays, 44 Yards, 2:49.

Second quarter

- DC – D'Eriq King 2-yard rush (2-pt Conversion Good by Chris Blair), 10:42. Defenders 14–3. Drive: 11 Plays, 72 Yards, 5:08.
- VGS – Bailey Giffen 33-yard field goal, 5:15. Defenders 14–6. Drive: 11 Plays, 50 Yards, 5:27.

Third quarter

- DC – Matt McCrane 20-yard field goal, 6:48. Defenders 17–6. Drive: 12 Plays, 80 Yards, 6:10.
- DC – Matt McCrane 35-yard field goal, 1:44. Defenders 20–6. Drive: 5 Plays, 43 Yards, 2:36.

Fourth quarter

- VGS – Cinque Sweeting 26-yard pass from Luis Perez (2-pt Conversion No Good), 14:22. Defenders 20–12. Drive: 5 Plays, 74 Yards, 2:22.
- DC – Matt McCrane 26-yard field goal, 6:53. Defenders 23–12. Drive: 14 Plays, 76 Yards, 7:29.
- DC – Jequez Ezzard 32-yard pass from D'Eriq King (2-pt Conversion No Good), 2:40. Defenders 29–12. Drive: 6 Plays, 52 Yards, 2:49.
- VGS – Cinque Sweeting 25-yard pass from Luis Perez (3-pt Conversion No Good), 1:55. Defenders 29–18. Drive: 2 Plays, 30 Yards, 0:45.
- DC – Matt McCrane 23-yard field goal, 0:47. Defenders 32–18. Drive: 5 Plays, 16 Yards, 1:02.

Top passers

- VGS – Luis Perez – 23/32, 283 yards, 2 TD
- DC – Jordan Ta'amu – 14/19, 177 yards, 0 TD

Top rushers

- VGS – John Lovett – 7 rushes, 39 yards
- DC – Abram Smith – 22 rushes, 58 yards

Top receivers

- VGS – Jeff Badet – 7 receptions, 80 yards
- DC – Josh Hammond – 5 receptions, 17 yards

==== Week 5: vs. Orlando Guardians ====
Week 5: Orlando Guardians at Vegas Vipers – Game summary

Quarter	1	2	3	4	Total
Guardians	7	6	6	13	32
Vipers	8	9	6	12	35

at Cashman Field, Las Vegas, Nevada

- Date: March 18
- Game time: 7:00 p.m. PDT
- Game weather: 62 °F (17 °C)
- Game attendance: 6,008
- Referee: Mike Vandervelde
- TV announcers (FX): Matt Barrie, Joey Galloway, Eric Mac Lain and Tiffany Blackmon

Game information

First quarter

- ORL – Quinton Flowers 1-yard rush (1-pt Conversion Good by Jah-Maine Martin), 8:25. Guardians 7–0. Drive: 13 Plays, 67 Yards, 6:35.
- VGS – Jeff Badet 35-yard pass from Luis Perez (2-pt Conversion Good by Rod Smith), 2:59. Vipers 8–7. Drive: 3 Plays, 40 Yards, 1:14.

Second quarter

- VGS – Sean Price 3-yard pass from Luis Perez (2-pt Conversion No Good), 10:44. Vipers 14–7. Drive: 5 Plays, 63 Yards, 2:47.
- VGS – Bailey Giffen 39-yard field goal. Vipers 17–7. Drive: 8 Plays, 45 Yards, 4:50.
- ORL – Charleston Rambo 25-yard pass from Quinten Dormady (1-pt Conversion No Good), 0:50. Vipers 17–13. Drive: 10 Plays, 71 Yards, 3:42.

Third quarter

- VGS – Rod Smith 1-yard rush (2-pt Conversion No Good), 9:53. Vipers 23–13. Drive: 9 Plays, 53 Yards, 5:07.
- ORL – Jah-Maine Martin 2-yard rush (2-pt Conversion No Good), 5:07. Vipers 23–19. Drive: 11 Plays, 73 Yards, 4:47.

Fourth quarter

- VGS – Rod Smith 1-yard rush (1-pt Conversion No Good), 14:57. Vipers 29–19. Drive: 10 Plays, 71 Yards, 5:10.
- ORL – Devin Darrington 2-yard rush (1-pt Conversion Good by Devin Darrington), 12:24. Vipers 29–26. Drive: 6 Plays, 73 Yards, 2:34.
- VGS – Jeff Badet 25-yard pass from Luis Perez (1-pt Conversion No Good), 6:26. Vipers 35–26. Drive: 10 Plays, 87 Yards, 5:57.
- ORL – Cody Latimer 45-yard pass from Quinten Dormady (3-pt Conversion No Good), 1:12. Vipers 35–32. Drive: 3 Plays, 61 Yards, 0:39.

Top passers

- ORL – Quinten Dormady – 22/25, 256 yards, 2 TD
- VGS – Luis Perez – 20/28, 269 yards, 3 TD

Top rushers

- ORL – Jah-Maine Martin – 9 rushes, 36 yards
- VGS – Rod Smith – 18 rushes, 62 yards

Top receivers

- ORL – Cody Latimer – 8 receptions, 124 yards
- VGS – Jeff Badet – 5 receptions, 80 yards

==== Week 6: vs. St. Louis BattleHawks ====
Week 6: St. Louis BattleHawks at Vegas Vipers – Game summary

Quarter	1	2	3	4	Total
BattleHawks	0	17	6	6	29
Vipers	0	0	0	6	6

at Cashman Field, Las Vegas, Nevada

- Date: March 25
- Game time: 4:00 p.m. PDT
- Game weather: 59 °F (15 °C)
- Game attendance: 6,033
- Referee: Jason Autrey
- TV announcers (FX): Lowell Galindo, Sam Acho, Ian Fitzsimmons and Taylor McGregor

Game information

First quarter

Second quarter

- STL – Gary Jennings Jr. 4-yard pass from A. J. McCarron (2-pt Conversion Good by Darrius Shepherd), 14:57. BattleHawks 8–0. Drive: 12 Plays, 62 Yards, 7:11.
- STL – Donny Hageman 40-yard field goal, 2:25. BattleHawks 11–0. Drive: 11 Plays, 75 Yards, 6:42.
- STL – Darrius Shepherd 30-yard pass from A. J. McCarron (2-pt Conversion No Good), 0:34. BattleHawks 17–0. Drive: 3 Plays, 57 Yards, 0:50.

Third quarter

- STL – Kareem Walker 1-yard rush (1-pt Conversion No Good), 9:32. BattleHawks 23–0. Drive: 7 Plays, 49 Yards, 4:03.

Fourth quarter

- VGS – John Lovett 17 yard pass from Brett Hundley (2-pt Conversion No Good), 7:05. BattleHawks 23–6. Drive: 5 Plays, 51 Yards, 2:10.
- STL – Darrius Shepherd 6-yard pass from A. J. McCarron (1-pt Conversion No Good), 3:06. BattleHawks 29–6. Drive: 6 Plays, 45 Yards, 3:55.

Top passers

- STL – A. J. McCarron – 23/29, 236 yards, 3 TD
- VGS – Luis Perez – 13/20, 99 yards, 0 TD

Top rushers

- STL – Brian Hill – 14 rushes, 71 yards
- VGS – John Lovett – 6 rushes, 19 yards

Top receivers

- STL – Darrius Shepherd – 7 receptions, 79 yards
- VGS – Jeff Badet – 4 receptions, 34 yards

==== Week 7: vs. San Antonio Brahmas ====
Week 7: San Antonio Brahmas at Vegas Vipers – Game summary

Quarter	1	2	3	4	Total
Brahmas	6	6	0	0	12
Vipers	8	11	7	0	26

at Cashman Field, Las Vegas, Nevada

- Date: April 1
- Game time: 12:00 p.m. PDT
- Game weather: 68 °F (20 °C)
- Game attendance: 6,041
- Referee: Reggie Smith
- TV announcers (ESPN2): Lowell Galindo, Sam Acho, Ian Fitzsimmons and Stormy Buonantony

Game information

First quarter

- SA – Fred Brown 1-yard pass from Kurt Benkert (2-pt Conversion No Good), 11:29. Brahmas 6–0. Drive: 6 Plays, 73 Yards, 3:33.
- VGS – Sean Price 33-yard pass from Jalan McClendon (2-pt Conversion Good by Cam Sutton), 6:40. Vipers 8–6. Drive: 9 Plays, 74 Yards, 4:47.

Second quarter

- VGS – Bailey Giffen 39-yard field goal, 11:11. Vipers 11–6. Drive: 12 Plays, 42 Yards, 7:31.
- SA – Kick returned 96 yards by Fred Brown for touchdown (2-pt Conversion No Good), 11:11. Brahmas 12–11. Drive: 1 play, 96 yards, 0:00.
- VGS – Rod Smith 17-yard pass from Jalan McClendon (2-pt Conversion Good by Sean Price), 7:09. Vipers 19–12. Drive: 7 Plays, 68 Yards, 3:52.

Third quarter

- VGS – John Lovett 1-yard rush (1-pt Conversion Good by Mathew Sexton), 10:54. Vipers 26–12. Drive: 10 Plays, 77 Yards, 4:06.

Fourth quarter

Top passers

- SA – Kurt Benkert – 22/31, 179 yards, 1 TD
- VGS – Jalan McClendon – 21/31, 264 yards, 2 TD

Top rushers

- SA – Jacques Patrick – 12 rushes, 20 yards
- VGS – Jalan McClendon – 8 rushes, 25 yards

Top receivers

- SA – Landen Akers – 6 receptions, 75 yards
- VGS – Mathew Sexton – 4 receptions, 72 yards

==== Week 8: at St. Louis BattleHawks ====
Week 8: Vegas Vipers at St. Louis BattleHawks – Game summary

Quarter	1	2	3	4	OT	Total
Vipers	8	3	0	6	0	17
BattleHawks	0	8	0	9	4	21

at The Dome at America's Center, St. Louis, Missouri

- Date: April 8
- Game time: 10:00 a.m. PDT
- Game weather: 63 °F (17 °C)
- Game attendance: 35,167
- Referee: Mike Vandervelde
- TV announcers (ESPN): Lowell Galindo, Sam Acho, Ian Fitzsimmons and Taylor McGregor

Game information

First quarter

- VGS – John Lovett 5-yard rush (2-pt Conversion Good by Martavis Bryant), 11:26. Vipers 8–0. Drive: 7 Plays, 48 Yards, 3:35.

Second quarter

- VGS – Sam Sloman 23-yard field goal, 14:46. Vipers 11–0. Drive: 16 Plays, 87 Yards, 8:56.
- STL – Hakeem Butler 32-yard pass from Nick Tiano (2-pt Conversion Good by Nick Tiano), 10:57. Vipers 11–8. Drive: 7 Plays, 73 Yards, 3:43.

Third quarter

Fourth quarter

- VGS – Geronimo Allison 27-yard pass from Jalan McClendon (1-pt Conversion No Good), 7:09. Vipers 17–8. Drive: 2 Plays, 27 Yards, 0:44.
- STL – Gary Jennings Jr. 64-yard pass from Sterling Hofrichter (3-pt Conversion No Good), 4:55. Vipers 17–14. Drive: 4 Plays, 68 Yards, 2:14.
- STL – Donny Hageman 34-yard field goal, 0:15. Tied 17–17. Drive: 10 Plays, 44 Yards, 1:45.

Overtime

- STL – Hakeem Butler pass from Nick Tiano for 2 points
- STL – Brian Hill rush for 2 points

Top passers

- VGS – Jalan McClendon – 13/23, 159 yards, 1 TD
- STL – Nick Tiano – 19/34, 194 yards, 1 TD

Top rushers

- VGS – Jalan McClendon – 13 rushes, 62 yards
- STL – Brian Hill – 10 rushes, 35 yards

Top receivers

- VGS – Mathew Sexton – 3 receptions, 27 yards
- STL – Brian Hill – 6 receptions, 37 yards

==== Week 9: at Houston Roughnecks ====
Week 9: Vegas Vipers at Houston Roughnecks – Game summary

Quarter	1	2	3	4	Total
Vipers	6	6	0	9	21
Roughnecks	0	6	13	9	28

at TDECU Stadium, Houston, Texas

- Date: April 15
- Game time: 9:30 a.m. PDT
- Game weather: 82 °F (28 °C)
- Game attendance: 10,967
- Referee: Chris Coyte
- TV announcers (ABC): Tom Hart, Greg McElroy, Cole Cubelic and Katie George

Game information

First quarter

- VGS – Sean Price 4-yard pass from Jalan McClendon (2-pt Conversion No Good), 0:40. Vipers 6–0. Drive: 9 Plays, 75 Yards, 4:41.

Second quarter

- VGS – Cinque Sweeting 2-yard pass from Jalan McClendon (2-pt Conversion No Good), 9:05. Vipers 12–0. Drive: 7 Plays, 41 Yards, 4:01.
- HOU – Fumble recovery returned for touchdown by Tavante Beckett (1-pt Conversion No Good), 3:49. Vipers 12–6. Drive: 6 Plays, 23 Yards, 3:18.

Third quarter

- HOU – Fumble recovery returned for touchdown by Ajene Harris (1-pt Conversion good by Tavonn Salter), 8:55. Roughnecks 13–12. Drive: 2 Plays, -1 Yards, 0:44.
- HOU – Max Borghi 2-yard rush (2-pt Conversion No Good), 1:16. Roughnecks 19–12. Drive: 8 Plays, 49 Yards, 4:00.

Fourth quarter

- VGS – Sam Sloman 53-yard field goal, 13:33. Roughnecks 19–15. Drive: 6 Plays, 30 Yards, 2:42.
- HOU – Brycen Alleyne 14-yard rush (2-pt Conversion No Good), Roughnecks 25–15. Drive: 2 Plays, 50 Yards, 0:43.
- VGS – John Lovett 25-yard rush (2-pt Conversion No Good), 6:23. Roughnecks 25–21. Drive: 4 Plays, 65 Yards, 2:28.
- HOU – Austin Jones 28-yard field goal, 1:49. Roughnecks 28–21. Drive: 10 Plays, 42 Yards, 4:34.

Top passers

- VGS – Jalan McClendon – 27/37, 249 yards, 2 TD
- HOU – Brandon Silvers – 16/27, 105 yards, 0 TD

Top rushers

- VGS – John Lovett – 9 rushes, 46 yards
- HOU – Brycen Alleyne – 12 rushes, 42 yards

Top receivers

- VGS – Geronimo Allison – 6 receptions, 60 yards
- HOU – Garrett Owens – 4 receptions, 23 yards

==== Week 10: at Seattle Sea Dragons ====
Week 10: Vegas Vipers at Seattle Sea Dragons – Game summary

Quarter	1	2	3	4	Total
Vipers	0	0	3	6	9
Sea Dragons	0	6	14	8	28

at Lumen Field, Seattle, Washington

- Date: April 23
- Game time: 4:00 p.m. PDT
- Game weather: 53 °F (12 °C)
- Game attendance: 15,046
- Referee: Jeff Heaser
- TV announcers (ESPN2): John Schriffen, Tom Luginbill, Harry Douglas and Stormy Buonantony

Game information

First quarter

Second quarter

- SEA – Ben DiNucci 14-yard rush (2-pt Conversion No Good), 1:16. Sea Dragons 6–0. Drive: 9 Plays, 66 Yards, 4:38.

Third quarter

- SEA – Jahcour Pearson 33-yard pass from Ben DiNucci (2-pt Conversion Good by Josh Gordon), 11:12. Sea Dragons 14–0. Drive: 7 Plays, 80 Yards, 3:48.
- VGS – Sam Sloman 53-yard field goal, 8:10. Sea Dragons 14–3. Drive: 6 Plays, 41 Yards, 3:02.
- SEA – Juwan Green 37-yard pass from Ben DiNucci (2-pt Conversion No Good), 5:02. Sea Dragons 20–3. Drive: 6 Plays, 64 Yards, 3:08.

Fourth quarter

- SEA – Jordan Veasy 3-yard pass from Ben DiNucci (2-pt Conversion Good by Blake Jackson), 14:25. Sea Dragons 28–3. Drive: 6 Plays, 60 Yards, 3:09.
- VGS – Shai Mckenzie 1-yard rush (2-pt Conversion No Good), 1:33. Sea Dragons 28–9. Drive: 3 Plays, 85 Yards, 0:58.

Top passers

- VGS – Jalan McClendon – 6/21, 201 yards, 0 TD
- SEA – Ben DiNucci – 26/41, 339 yards, 3 TD

Top rushers

- VGS – John Lovett – 7 rushes, 30 yards
- SEA – T. J. Hammonds – 8 rushes, 12 yards

Top receivers

- VGS – Mathew Sexton – 2 receptions, 119 yards
- SEA – Josh Gordon – 9 receptions, 115 yards

== Standings ==
2023 XFL standings
North Division
Team	W	L	PCT	GB	TD+/-	TD+	TD-	DIV	PF	PA	DIFF	STK
(y) DC Defenders	9	1	.900	–	-2	33	35	6–0	298	240	58	W3
(x) Seattle Sea Dragons	7	3	.700	2	+10	30	20	3–3	243	177	66	W2
(e) St. Louis Battlehawks	7	3	.700	2	+9	32	23	3–3	249	202	47	W1
(e) Vegas Vipers	2	8	.200	7	0	28	28	0–6	184	252	-68	L3
South Division
Team	W	L	PCT	GB	TD+/-	TD+	TD-	DIV	PF	PA	DIFF	STK
(y) Houston Roughnecks	7	3	.700	–	+4	30	26	6–0	247	182	65	W3
(x) Arlington Renegades	4	6	.400	3	-8	15	23	3–3	146	194	-48	L2
(e) San Antonio Brahmas	3	7	.300	4	-8	16	24	3–3	169	183	-14	L1
(e) Orlando Guardians	1	9	.100	6	-5	32	37	0–6	204	310	-106	L3
(x)–clinched playoff berth; (y)–clinched division; (e)–eliminated from playoff contention

== Staff ==
Vegas Vipers staff
Front office: Director of team operations / Team president – Temeko Richardson; Director of player personnel - Joey Clinkscales; Head coaches: General manager/Head coach – Rod Woodson; Offensive coaches: Running backs – Marcus Lewis; Wide receivers – Ray Sherman; Tight ends/Special teams – Charlie Eger; Offensive line – Bob Wylie; Assistant – Mike Newton	Defensive coaches: Defensive coordinator – Cris Dishman; Defensive Line/OLB – Chuck Bresnahan; Linebackers – Jen Welter; Defensive backs – Darren Perry; Team Operations: Quality control – Franco Arellanos; Athletic Trainer - Justin Bland; Asst Athletic Trainer - Annie Wilkerson; Equipment Manager: Bob Wick

*Offensive Coordinator Duane Taylor was fired after Week 3 and Wide Receivers Coach Ray Sherman took over play-calling duties.

*After week 5, Mike Newton was hired as an assistant coach.
