= 2023 Seattle Sea Dragons season =

American professional football season

- Owner: Alpha Acquico, LLC
- General manager: Jim Haslett
- Head coach: Jim Haslett
- Home stadium: Lumen Field

Results
- Record: 7–3
- Division place: 2nd XFL North
- Playoffs: Lost Division Finals (at Defenders) 21–37

The 2023 Seattle Sea Dragons season was the second season for the Seattle Sea Dragons as a professional American football franchise. They played as charter members of the XFL, one of eight teams to compete in the league for the 2023 season. The Sea Dragons played their home games at the Lumen Field and were led by head coach Jim Haslett.

The Sea Dragons had changed their franchise name from Seattle Dragons to Seattle Sea Dragons prior to the 2023 season.

Earning their first playoff berth and clinching second place in the North Division, the Sea Dragons were eliminated by the DC Defenders in the North Division title game in the playoffs.

On January 1, 2024, it was announced that the 2023 season was the last season for the Sea Dragons.

== Final roster ==
2023 Seattle Sea Dragons final roster
Quarterbacks: 6 Ben DiNucci; 14 Harrison Frost; 12 Steven Montez; Running backs: 28 Brenden Knox; 30 Phillip Lindsay; 89 Charlie Taumoepeau; Wide receivers: 0 Josh Gordon; 4 Juwan Green; 19 T. J. Hammonds; 80 Blake Jackson; 82 McLane Mannix; 86 Kelvin McKnight; 3 Jahcour Pearson; 88 Jordan Veasy; 15 Damion Willis	Offensive linemen: 65 Paul Grattan G; 67 Colin Kelly T; 56 Tejan Koroma C; 72 Michal Menet G; 55 Chris Owens G; 70 Josh Seltzner G; 73 Jared Thomas C; 69 Barry Wesley T; Defensive linemen: 58 Austin Faoliu DT; 52 Antwuan Jackson DT; 96 Daniel Joseph DE; 97 Niko Lalos DE; 48 Shareef Miller DE; 50 Sama Paama DT; 44 Elijah Ponder DE; 51 Tuzar Skipper DE; 99 Tariqious Tisdale DT; 90 Markell Utsey DT	Linebackers: 40 Tyrell Adams; 22 Sharif Finch; 9 Clarence Hicks; 8 Tre Walker; Defensive backs: 2 Antoine Brooks SS; 32 Qwynnterrio Cole FS; 24 Shabari Davis CB; 17 Rojesterman Farris CB; 27 Olaijah Griffin CB; 33 Alijah Holder FS; 36 Zafir Kelly CB; 5 Chris Payton-Jones CB; 21 Linden Stephens CB; 1 Bryce Thompson CB/SS; 16 Mykael Wright CB; Special teams: 11 Dominik Eberle K; 45 Thomas Fletcher LS; 10 Cameron Nizialek P	Reserve lists: 25 Morgan Ellison RB (IR); 26 Jordan Evans LB (IR); 71 Liam Jimmons T (IR); -- Scottie Phillips RB (IR); 13 Jaylon Redd WR (IR); 43 Emmanuel Smith LB (IR); 51 active, 6 inactive

* Defensive end Chris Smith died on April 17, 2023, eight days after he played in an XFL game against the D.C. Defenders.

== Background ==
The 2020 season was the inaugural season for the Seattle Dragons as a professional club. They were playing as charter members of the rebooted XFL, one of eight teams to compete in the league for the season. The Dragons played their home games at CenturyLink Field and were led by head coach Jim Zorn.

Their inaugural season was cut short after 5 weeks due to the COVID-19 pandemic and the XFL suspended operations for the remainder of the season on March 20, 2020. The Dragons finished the season with a 1–4 record.

== Schedule ==
All times Pacific

Week	Day	Date	Kickoff	TV	Opponent	Results		Location	Attendance
Week	Day	Date	Kickoff	TV	Opponent	Score	Record	Location	Attendance
1	Sunday	February 19	5:00 p.m.	ESPN	at DC Defenders	18–22	0–1	Audi Field	12,438
2	Thursday	February 23	6:00 p.m.	FX	St. Louis BattleHawks	18–20	0–2	Lumen Field	10,386
3	Saturday	March 4	4:00 p.m.	FX	at Vegas Vipers	30–26	1–2	Cashman Field	6,037
4	Saturday	March 11	7:00 p.m.	FX	San Antonio Brahmas	15–6	2–2	Lumen Field	15,103
5	Thursday	March 16	7:30 p.m.	ESPN	Houston Roughnecks	21–14	3–2	Lumen Field	9,231
6	Saturday	March 25	10:00 a.m.	ABC	at Orlando Guardians	26–19	4–2	Camping World Stadium	7,832
7	Friday	March 31	4:00 p.m.	FX	at Arlington Renegades	24–15	5–2	Choctaw Stadium	11,032
8	Sunday	April 9	4:00 p.m.	ESPN2	DC Defenders	33–34	5–3	Lumen Field	11,874
9	Sunday	April 16	12:00 p.m.	ESPN	at St. Louis BattleHawks	30–12	6–3	The Dome at America's Center	33,142
10	Sunday	April 23	4:00 p.m.	ESPN2	Vegas Vipers	28–9	7–3	Lumen Field	15,046

=== Game summaries ===
==== Week 1: at DC Defenders ====
Week 1: Seattle Sea Dragons at DC Defenders – Game summary

Quarter	1	2	3	4	Total
Sea Dragons	9	0	9	0	18
Defenders	0	8	8	6	22

at Audi Field, Washington, DC

- Date: February 19
- Game time: 5:00 p.m. PDT
- Game weather: 56 °F (13 °C)
- Game attendance: 12,438
- Referee: Jeff Heaser
- TV announcers (ESPN): John Schriffen, Tom Luginbill, and Stormy Buonantony

Game information

First quarter

- SEA – Josh Gordon 6-yard pass from Ben DiNucci (3-pt Conversion No Good), 9:13. Sea Dragons 6–0. Drive: 11 plays, 71 yards, 5:47.
- SEA – Dominik Eberle 36-yard field goal, 1:36. Sea Dragons 9–0. Drive: 11 plays, 52 yards, 5:52.

Second quarter

- DC – Jordan Ta'amu 1-yard rush (2-pt Conversion Good by Lucky Jackson), 8:58. Sea Dragons 9–8. Drive: 15 plays, 73 yards, 7:23.

Third quarter

- SEA – Brenden Knox 13-yard rush (3-pt Conversion Good by Ben DiNucci), 9:42. Sea Dragons 18–8. Drive: 8 plays, 56 yards, 3:45.
- DC – Michael Joseph 15-yard interception return (2-pt Conversion Good by D'Eriq King), 6:28. Sea Dragons 18–16. Drive: 1 play, 15 yards, 0:04.

Fourth quarter

- DC – D'Eriq King 5-yard rush (2-pt Conversion No Good), 14:14. Defenders 22–18. Drive: 2 plays, 4 yards, 0:34.

Top passers

- SEA – Ben DiNucci – 35/54, 282 yards, 1 TD, 2 INT
- DC – Jordan Ta'amu – 8/19, 86 yards, 0 TD, 1 INT

Top rushers

- SEA – Brenden Knox – 11 rushes, 31 yards
- DC – Abram Smith – 11 rushes, 28 yards

Top receivers

- SEA – Jahcour Pearson – 12 receptions, 95 yards
- DC – Lucky Jackson – 4 receptions, 25 yards

==== Week 2: vs. St. Louis BattleHawks ====
Week 2: St. Louis BattleHawks at Seattle Sea Dragons – Game summary

Quarter	1	2	3	4	Total
BattleHawks	0	8	3	9	20
Sea Dragons	3	9	0	6	18

at Lumen Field, Seattle, Washington

- Date: February 23
- Game time: 6:00 p.m. PDT
- Game weather: 28 °F (−2 °C)
- Game attendance: 10,386
- Referee: Francisco Villar
- TV announcers (FX): Lowell Galindo, Sam Acho, and Taylor McGregor

Game information

First quarter

- SEA – Dominik Eberle 29-yard field goal, 4:02. Sea Dragons 3–0. Drive: 13 plays, 61 yards, 7:02.

Second quarter

- SEA – Josh Gordon 54-yard pass from Ben DiNucci (3-pt Conversion Good by Josh Gordon), 14:56. Sea Dragons 12–0. Drive: 2 plays, 73 yards, 0:34.
- STL – A. J. McCarron 1-yard rush (2-pt Conversion Good by Marcell Ateman), 7:26. Sea Dragons 12–8. Drive: 14 plays, 72 yards, 7:24.

Third quarter

- STL – Donny Hageman 44-yard field goal, 6:32. Sea Dragons 12–11. Drive: 7 plays, 16 yards, 3:58.

Fourth quarter

- STL – Hakeem Butler 44-yard pass from A. J. McCarron (2-pt Conversion No Good), 7:14. BattleHawks 17–12. Drive: 6 plays, 73 yards, 3:00.
- SEA – Jordan Veasy 8-yard pass from Ben DiNucci (3-pt Conversion No Good), 1:21. Sea Dragons 18–17. Drive: 7 plays, 60 yards, 1:50.
- STL – Donny Hageman 44-yard field goal, 0:00. BattleHawks 20–18. Drive: 8 plays, 50 yards, 1:21.

Top passers

- STL – A. J. McCarron – 22/36, 184 yards, 1 TD
- SEA – Ben DiNucci – 19/29, 196 yards, 2 TD

Top rushers

- STL – A. J. McCarron – 5 rushes, 41 yards, 1 TD
- SEA – Morgan Ellison – 10 rushes, 50 yards

Top receivers

- STL – Hakeem Butler – 4 receptions, 61 yards, 1 TD
- SEA – Jahcour Pearson – 4 receptions, 78 yards, 1 TD

==== Week 3: at Vegas Vipers ====
Week 3: Seattle Sea Dragons at Vegas Vipers – Game summary

Quarter	1	2	3	4	Total
Sea Dragons	6	3	6	15	30
Vipers	6	3	11	6	26

at Cashman Field, Las Vegas, Nevada

- Date: March 4
- Game time: 4:00 p.m. PDT
- Game weather: 64 °F (18 °C)
- Game attendance: 6,037
- Referee: Reggie Smith
- TV announcers (FX): Matt Barrie, Joey Galloway, and Tiffany Blackmon

Game information

First quarter

- VGS – Jeff Badet 12-yard pass from Brett Hundley (2-pt Conversion No Good), 10:20. Vipers 6–0. Drive: 6 Plays, 25 Yards, 2:40.
- SEA – Blake Jackson 26-yard pass from Ben DiNucci (3-pt Conversion No Good), 1:32. Tied 6–6. Drive: 7 Plays, 91 Yards, 3:47.

Second quarter

- VGS – Bailey Giffen 39-yard field goal, 7:38. Vipers 9–6. Drive: 8 Plays, 53 Yards, 4:11.
- SEA – Dominik Eberle 34-yard field goal, 1:55. Tied 9–9. Drive: 6 Plays, 49 Yards, 2:10.

Third quarter

- VGS – Brett Hundley 6-yard rush (2-pt Conversion Good by Martavis Bryant), 12:06. Vipers 17–9. Drive: 6 Plays, 75 Yards, 2:54.
- VGS – Bailey Giffen 47-yard field goal, 6:24. Vipers 20–9. Drive: 8 Plays, 30 Yards, 3:18.
- SEA – Josh Gordon 16-yard pass from Ben DiNucci (3-pt Conversion No Good), 1:17. Vipers 20–15. Drive: 9 Plays, 82 Yards, 5:07.

Fourth quarter

- SEA – Dominik Eberle 32-yard field goal, 7:06. Vipers 20–18. Drive: 10 Plays, 55 Yards, 5:28.
- VGS – John Lovett 50-yard pass from Brett Hundley (2-pt Conversion No Good), 6:45. Vipers 26–18. Drive: 1 Play, 50 Yards, 0:21.
- SEA – Juwan Green 22-yard pass from Ben DiNucci (3-pt Conversion No Good), 3:36. Vipers 26–24. Drive: 6 Plays, 73 Yards, 3:09.
- SEA – Josh Gordon 65-yard pass from Ben DiNucci (3-pt Conversion No Good), 1:00. Sea Dragons 30–26. Drive: 4 Plays, 73 Yards, 0:43.

Top passers

- SEA – Ben DiNucci – 29/37, 377 yards, 4 TD
- VGS – Brett Hundley – 13/28, 224 yards, 2 TD

Top rushers

- SEA – Morgan Ellison – 17 rushes, 103 yards
- VGS – Rod Smith – 10 rushes, 41 yards

Top receivers

- SEA – Jahcour Pearson – 7 receptions, 99 yards
- VGS – Jeff Badet – 4 receptions, 93 yards

==== Week 4: vs. San Antonio Brahmas ====
Week 4: San Antonio Brahmas at Seattle Sea Dragons – Game summary

Quarter	1	2	3	4	Total
Brahmas	3	3	0	0	6
Sea Dragons	0	6	3	6	15

at Lumen Field, Seattle, Washington

- Date: March 11
- Game time: 7:00 p.m. PDT
- Game weather: 45 °F (7 °C)
- Game attendance: 15,103
- Referee: Chris Coyte
- TV announcers (FX): Lowell Galindo, Sam Acho, and Taylor McGregor

Game information

First quarter

- SA – Parker Romo 38-yard field goal, 0:38. Brahmas 3–0. Drive: 11 Plays, 60 Yards, 6:02.

Second quarter

- SEA – Juwan Green 4-yard pass from Ben DiNucci (3-pt Conversion No Good), 0:39. Sea Dragons 6–3. Drive: 7 Plays, 85 Yards, 1:14.
- SA – Parker Romo 57-yard field goal, 0:04. Tied 6–6. Drive: 4 Plays, 41 Yards, 0:33.

Third quarter

- SEA – Dominik Eberle 35-yard field goal, 2:02. Sea Dragons 9–6. Drive: 13 Plays, 60 Yards, 7:09.

Fourth quarter

- SEA – Morgan Ellison 1-yard rush (1-pt Conversion No Good), 3:10. Sea Dragons 15–6. Drive: 10 Plays, 59 Yards, 5:42.

Top passers

- SA – Jack Coan – 20/39, 189 yards, 0 TD
- SEA – Ben DiNucci – 28/41, 264 yards, 1 TD

Top rushers

- SA – Kalen Ballage – 5 rushes, 5 yards
- SEA – Morgan Ellison – 16 rushes, 69 yards

Top receivers

- SA – Jalen Tolliver – 6 receptions, 34 yards
- SEA – Jahcour Pearson – 8 receptions, 76 yards

==== Week 5: vs. Houston Roughnecks ====
Week 5: Houston Roughnecks at Seattle Sea Dragons – Game summary

Quarter	1	2	3	4	Total
Roughnecks	0	0	0	14	14
Sea Dragons	6	9	0	6	21

at Lumen Field, Seattle, Washington

- Date: March 16
- Game time: 7:30 p.m. PDT
- Game weather: 48 °F (9 °C)
- Game attendance: 9,231
- Referee: Jason Autrey
- TV announcers (ESPN): Lowell Galindo, Sam Acho, and Taylor McGregor

Game information

First quarter

- SEA – Ben DiNucci 20-yard rush (3-pt Conversion No Good), 3:43. Sea Dragons 6–0. Drive: 7 Plays, 46 Yards, 3:23.

Second quarter

- SEA – Damion Willis 9-yard pass from Ben DiNucci (3-pt Conversion Good by Juwan Green), 0:45. Sea Dragons 15–0. Drive: 9 Plays, 90 Yards, 3:38.

Third quarter

Fourth quarter

- HOU – Max Borghi 1-yard rush (2-pt Conversion No Good), 7:22. Sea Dragons 15–6. Drive: 4 Plays, 25 Yards, 2:04.
- SEA – Darius Bradwell 3-yard rush (3-pt Conversion No Good), 1:22. Sea Dragons 21–6. Drive: 6 Plays, 38 Yards, 2:25.
- HOU – Justin Smith 47-yard pass from Brandon Silvers (2-pt Conversion Good by Deontay Burnett), 0:29. Sea Dragons 21–14. Drive: 8 Plays, 74 Yards, 0:58.

Top passers

- HOU – Brandon Silvers – 25/47, 227 yards, 1 TD
- SEA – Ben DiNucci – 17/32, 209 yards, 1 TD

Top rushers

- HOU – Max Borghi – 6 rushes, 12 yards
- SEA – Darius Bradwell – 9 rushes, 12 yards

Top receivers

- HOU – Travell Harris – 5 receptions, 58 yards
- SEA – Jahcour Pearson – 5 receptions, 82 yards

==== Week 6: at Orlando Guardians ====
Week 6: Seattle Sea Dragons at Orlando Guardians – Game summary

Quarter	1	2	3	4	Total
Sea Dragons	3	6	8	9	26
Guardians	0	10	6	3	19

at Camping World Stadium, Orlando, Florida

- Date: March 25
- Game time: 10:00 a.m. PDT
- Game weather: 83 °F (28 °C)
- Game attendance: 7,832
- Referee: Francisco Villar
- TV announcers (ABC): Roy Philpott, Joey Galloway, and Tiffany Blackmon

Game information

First quarter

- SEA – Dominik Eberle 37-yard field goal, 6:03. Sea Dragons 3–0 Drive: 7 Plays, 24 Yards, 4:09.

Second quarter

- ORL – José Borregales 26-yard field goal, 12:17. Tied 3–3. Drive: 7 Plays, 43 Yards, 3:26.
- SEA – Dominik Eberle 27-yard field goal, 8:23. Sea Dragons 6–3. Drive: 7 Plays, 14 Yards, 3:54.
- ORL – Devin Darrington 3-yard rush (1-pt Conversion Good by Devin Darrington), 2:16. Guardians 10–6. Drive: 12 Plays, 65 Yards, 5:55.
- SEA – Dominik Eberle 54-yard field goal, 0:06. Guardians 10–9. Drive: 4 Plays, 29 Yards, 0:24.

Third quarter

- SEA – Blake Jackson 20-yard pass from Ben DiNucci (2-pt Conversion Good by Jahcour Pearson), 7:01. Sea Dragons 17–10. Drive: 6 Plays, 65 Yards, 2:55.
- ORL – Devin Darrington 43-yard rush (2-pt Conversion No Good), 4:44. Sea Dragons 17–16. Drive: 6 Plays, 73 Yards, 2:17.

Fourth quarter

- SEA – Dominik Eberle 27-yard field goal, 13:49. Sea Dragons 20–16. Drive: 11 Plays, 61 Yards, 5:55.
- ORL – José Borregales 50-yard field goal, 11:44. Sea Dragons 20–19. Drive: 5 Plays, 51 Yards, 2:05.
- SEA – Juwan Green 4-yard pass from Ben DiNucci (2-pt Conversion No Good), 6:00. Sea Dragons 26–19. Drive: 3 Plays, 6 Yards, 1:14.

Top passers

- SEA – Ben DiNucci – 18/35, 177 yards, 2 TD
- ORL – Quinten Dormady – 24/44, 243 yards, 0 TD

Top rushers

- SEA – Darius Bradwell – 12 rushes, 32 yards
- ORL – Jah-Maine Martin – 10 rushes, 37 yards

Top receivers

- SEA – Blake Jackson – 6 receptions, 79 yards
- ORL – Charleston Rambo – 6 receptions, 54 yards

==== Week 7: at Arlington Renegades ====
Week 7: Seattle Sea Dragons at Arlington Renegades – Game summary

Quarter	1	2	3	4	Total
Sea Dragons	3	18	0	3	24
Renegades	3	6	0	6	15

at Choctaw Stadium, Arlington, Texas

- Date: March 31
- Game time: 4:00 p.m. PDT
- Game weather: 81 °F (27 °C)
- Game attendance: 11,032
- Referee: Mike Vandervelde
- TV announcers (FX): Roy Philpott, Joey Galloway, and Tiffany Blackmon

Game information

First quarter

- SEA – Dominik Eberle 44-yard field goal, 9:27. Sea Dragons 3–0. Drive: 9 Plays, 34 Yards, 5:33.
- ARL – Taylor Russolino 36-yard field goal, 1:43. Tied 3–3. Drive: 14 Plays, 56 Yards, 7:44.

Second quarter

- SEA – Dominik Eberle 33-yard field goal, 12:18. Sea Dragons 6–3. Drive: 8 Plays, 60 Yards, 4:25.
- SEA – Darius Bradwell 2-yard rush (1-pt Conversion Good by Darius Bradwell), 5:01. Sea Dragons 13–3. Drive: 3 Plays, 57 Yards, 1:08.
- ARL – De'Veon Smith 1-yard rush (1-pt Conversion No Good), 1:01. Sea Dragons 13–9. Drive: 9 Plays, 72 Yards, 3:59.
- SEA – Josh Gordon 24-yard pass from Ben DiNucci (2-pt Conversion Good by Juwan Green), 0:08. Sea Dragons 21–9. Drive: 6 Plays, 76 Yards, 0:53.

Third quarter

Fourth quarter

- SEA – Dominik Eberle 48-yard field goal, 6:45. Sea Dragons 24–9. Drive: 12 Plays, 49 Yards, 7:00.
- ARL – De'Veon Smith 2-yard rush (2-pt Conversion No Good), 2:17. Sea Dragons 24–15. Drive: 8 Plays, 72 Yards, 4:28.

Top passers

- SEA – Ben DiNucci – 21/32, 266 yards, 1 TD
- ARL – Drew Plitt – 19/29, 213 yards, 0 TD

Top rushers

- SEA – Ben DiNucci – 9 rushes, 52 yards
- ARL – De'Veon Smith – 12 rushes, 61 yards

Top receivers

- SEA – Jahcour Pearson – 5 receptions, 31 yards
- ARL – Sal Cannella – 4 receptions, 64 yards

==== Week 8: vs. DC Defenders ====
Week 8: DC Defenders at Seattle Sea Dragons – Game summary

Quarter	1	2	3	4	Total
Defenders	8	8	6	12	34
Sea Dragons	0	6	9	18	33

at Lumen Field, Seattle, Washington

- Date: April 9
- Game time: 4:00 p.m. PDT
- Game weather: 58 °F (14 °C)
- Game attendance: 11,874
- Referee: Jason Autrey
- TV announcers (ESPN2): Roy Philpott, Eric Mac Lain, Tiffany Blackmon

Game information

First quarter

- DC – Abram Smith 2-yard rush (2-pt Conversion Good by Lucky Jackson), 9:22. Defenders 8–0. Drive: 3 Plays, 64 Yards, 0:55.

Second quarter

- SEA – Phillip Lindsay 2-yard rush (3-pt Conversion No Good), 10:35. Defenders 8–6. Drive: 12 Plays, 60 Yards, 6:47.
- DC – Ryquell Armstead 11-yard pass from Jordan Ta'amu (2-pt Conversion Good by Lucky Jackson), 1:24. Defenders 16–6. Drive: 9 Plays, 60 Yards, 3:59.

Third quarter

- DC – Alex Ellis 14-yard pass from Jordan Ta'amu (2-pt Conversion No Good), 8:34. Defenders 22–6. Drive: 7 Plays, 71 Yards, 4:22.
- SEA – Defensive 2-pt Conversion, 8:34. Defenders 22–8. Drive: 1 play, -5 yards, 0:01.
- SEA – Juwan Green 46-yard pass from Ben DiNucci (1-pt Conversion Good by Blake Jackson), 6:33. Defenders 22–15. Drive: 4 Plays, 75 Yards, 2:02.

Fourth quarter

- SEA – Dominik Eberle 29-yard field goal, 12:37. Defenders 22–18. Drive: 7 Plays, 44 Yards, 3:15.
- DC – Brandon Smith 5-yard pass from Jordan Ta'amu (2-pt Conversion No Good), 5:13. Defenders 28–18. Drive: 13 Plays, 73 Yards, 7:24.
- SEA – Juwan Green 56-yard pass from Ben DiNucci (3-pt Conversion Good by Blake Jackson), 4:05. Defenders 28–27. Drive: 3 Plays, 79 Yards, 1:09.
- DC – Chris Blair 70-yard pass from Jordan Ta'amu (2-pt Conversion No Good), 2:10. Defenders 34–27. Drive: 3 Plays, 72 Yards, 2:02.
- SEA – Jahcour Pearson 14-yard pass from Ben DiNucci (2-pt Conversion No Good), 0:32. Defenders 34–33. Drive: 9 Plays, 70 Yards, 1:31.

Top passers

- DC – Jordan Ta'amu – 17/26, 247 yards, 4 TD
- SEA – Ben DiNucci – 28/42, 301 yards, 3 TD

Top rushers

- DC – Abram Smith – 17 rushes, 66 yards
- SEA – Phillip Lindsay – 8 rushes, 23 yards

Top receivers

- DC – Chris Blair – 5 receptions, 148 yards
- SEA – Juwan Green – 7 receptions, 142 yards

==== Week 9: at St. Louis BattleHawks ====
Week 9: Seattle Sea Dragons at St. Louis BattleHawks – Game summary

Quarter	1	2	3	4	Total
Sea Dragons	8	6	6	10	30
BattleHawks	3	6	3	0	12

at The Dome at America's Center, St. Louis, Missouri

- Date: April 16
- Game time: 12:00 p.m. PDT
- Game weather: 47 °F (8 °C)
- Referee: Reggie Smith
- TV announcers (ESPN): Matt Barrie, Eric Mac Lain, and Tiffany Blackmon

Game information

First quarter

- SEA – T. J. Hammonds 9-yard rush (2-pt Conversion Good by Phillip Lindsay), 7:35. Sea Dragons 8–0. Drive: 12 Plays, 74 Yards, 7:25.
- STL – Donny Hageman 45-yard field goal, 2:48. Sea Dragons 8–3. Drive: 9 Plays, 44 Yards, 4:47.

Second quarter

- STL – Darrius Shepherd 42-yard pass from A. J. McCarron (2-pt Conversion No Good), 9:51. BattleHawks 9–8. Drive: 7 Plays, 92 Yards, 3:51.
- SEA – Jordan Veasy 2-yard pass from Ben DiNucci (2-pt Conversion No Good), 3:09. Sea Dragons 14–9. Drive: 5 Plays, 53 Yards, 2:46.

Third quarter

- SEA – Jahcour Pearson 68-yard pass from Ben DiNucci (3-pt Conversion No Good), 11:36. Sea Dragons 20–9. Drive: 3 Plays, 63 Yards, 1:35.
- STL – Donny Hageman 54-yard field goal, 3:24. Sea Dragons 20–12. Drive: 7 Plays, 24 Yards, 4:19.

Fourth quarter

- SEA – Ben DiNucci 8-yard rush (1-pt Conversion Good by Phillip Lindsay), 4:00. Sea Dragons 27–12. Drive: 3 Plays, 16 Yards, 1:27.
- SEA – Dominik Eberle 36-yard field goal, 0:05. Sea Dragons 30–12. Drive: 7 Plays, 42 Yards, 1:54.

Top passers

- SEA – Ben DiNucci – 21/31, 260 yards, 2 TD
- STL – A. J. McCarron – 18/32, 186 yards, 1 TD

Top rushers

- SEA – Phillip Lindsay – 10 rushes, 17 yards
- STL – Brian Hill – 5 rushes, 11 yards

Top receivers

- SEA – Jahcour Pearson – 7 receptions, 115 yards
- STL – Marcell Ateman – 7 receptions, 99 yards

==== Week 10: vs. Vegas Vipers ====
Week 10: Vegas Vipers at Seattle Sea Dragons – Game summary

Quarter	1	2	3	4	Total
Vipers	0	0	3	6	9
Sea Dragons	0	6	14	8	28

at Lumen Field, Seattle, Washington

- Date: April 23
- Game time: 4:00 p.m. PDT
- Game weather: 53 °F (12 °C)
- Game attendance: 15,046
- Referee: Jeff Heaser
- TV announcers (ESPN2): John Schriffen, Tom Luginbill, and Stormy Buonantony

Game information

First quarter

Second quarter

- SEA – Ben DiNucci 14-yard rush (2-pt Conversion No Good), 1:16. Sea Dragons 6–0. Drive: 9 Plays, 66 Yards, 4:38.

Third quarter

- SEA – Jahcour Pearson 33-yard pass from Ben DiNucci (2-pt Conversion Good by Josh Gordon), 11:12. Sea Dragons 14–0. Drive: 7 Plays, 80 Yards, 3:48.
- VGS – Sam Sloman 53-yard field goal, 8:10. Sea Dragons 14–3. Drive: 6 Plays, 41 Yards, 3:02.
- SEA – Juwan Green 37-yard pass from Ben DiNucci (2-pt Conversion No Good), 5:02. Sea Dragons 20–3. Drive: 6 Plays, 64 Yards, 3:08.

Fourth quarter

- SEA – Jordan Veasy 3-yard pass from Ben DiNucci (2-pt Conversion Good by Blake Jackson), 14:25. Sea Dragons 28–3. Drive: 6 Plays, 60 Yards, 3:09.
- VGS – Shai Mckenzie 1-yard rush (2-pt Conversion No Good), 1:33. Sea Dragons 28–9. Drive: 3 Plays, 85 Yards, 0:58.

Top passers

- VGS – Jalan McClendon – 6/21, 201 yards, 0 TD
- SEA – Ben DiNucci – 26/41, 339 yards, 3 TD

Top rushers

- VGS – John Lovett – 7 rushes, 30 yards
- SEA – T. J. Hammonds – 8 rushes, 12 yards

Top receivers

- VGS – Mathew Sexton – 2 receptions, 119 yards
- SEA – Josh Gordon – 9 receptions, 115 yards

== Standings ==
2023 XFL standings
North Division
Team	W	L	PCT	GB	TD+/-	TD+	TD-	DIV	PF	PA	DIFF	STK
(y) DC Defenders	9	1	.900	–	-2	33	35	6–0	298	240	58	W3
(x) Seattle Sea Dragons	7	3	.700	2	+10	30	20	3–3	243	177	66	W2
(e) St. Louis Battlehawks	7	3	.700	2	+9	32	23	3–3	249	202	47	W1
(e) Vegas Vipers	2	8	.200	7	0	28	28	0–6	184	252	-68	L3
South Division
Team	W	L	PCT	GB	TD+/-	TD+	TD-	DIV	PF	PA	DIFF	STK
(y) Houston Roughnecks	7	3	.700	–	+4	30	26	6–0	247	182	65	W3
(x) Arlington Renegades	4	6	.400	3	-8	15	23	3–3	146	194	-48	L2
(e) San Antonio Brahmas	3	7	.300	4	-8	16	24	3–3	169	183	-14	L1
(e) Orlando Guardians	1	9	.100	6	-5	32	37	0–6	204	310	-106	L3
(x)–clinched playoff berth; (y)–clinched division; (e)–eliminated from playoff contention

== Postseason ==
=== Schedule ===
Week	Day	Date	Kickoff	TV	Opponent	Results		Location	Attendance
Week	Day	Date	Kickoff	TV	Opponent	Score	Record	Location	Attendance
Division Finals	Sunday	April 30	12:00 p.m.	ESPN	at DC Defenders	21–37	0–1	Audi Field	18,684

=== Game summaries ===
==== XFL North Division Finals: at (1) DC Defenders ====
XFL North Division Finals: (2) Seattle Sea Dragons at (1) DC Defenders – Game summary

Quarter	1	2	3	4	Total
Sea Dragons	3	6	0	12	21
Defenders	9	0	14	14	37

at Audi Field, Washington, DC

- Date: May 3
- Game time: 12:00 p.m. PDT
- Game weather: 61 °F (16 °C)
- Game attendance: 18,684
- Referee: Reggie Smith
- TV announcers (ESPN): Tom Hart, Greg McElroy, Cole Cubelic and Katie George

Game information

First quarter

- SEA – Dominik Eberle 33-yard field goal, 9:54. Sea Dragons 3–0. Drive: 10 Plays, 59 Yards, 5:06.
- DC – Matt McCrane 24-yard field goal, 6:55. Tied 3–3. Drive: 6 Plays, 59 Yards, 2:59.
- DC – Lucky Jackson 44-yard pass from Jordan Ta'amu (2-pt Conversion No Good), 1:59. Defenders 9–3. Drive: 7 Plays, 69 Yards, 3:05.

Second quarter

- SEA – Jahcour Pearson 15-yard pass from Ben DiNucci (2-pt Conversion No Good), 11:3. Tied 9–9. Drive: 10 Plays, 76 Yards, 5:21.

Third quarter

- DC – Abram Smith 1-yard rush (2-pt Conversion No Good), 9:25. Defenders 15–9. Drive: 11 Plays, 78 Yards, 5:35.
- DC – Ethan Wolf 26-yard pass from Jordan Ta'amu (2-pt Conversion Good by Alex Ellis), 4:49. Defenders 23–9. Drive: 6 Plays, 56 Yards, 2:36.

Fourth quarter

- DC – Cam'Ron Harris 1-yard rush (1-pt Conversion Good by Abram Smith), 11:53. Defenders 30–9. Drive: 9 Plays, 65 Yards, 4:41.
- SEA – Juwan Green 34-yard pass from Ben DiNucci (2-pt Conversion No Good), 6:05. Defenders 30–15. Drive: 4 Plays, 65 Yards, 1:38.
- DC – Cam'Ron Harris 11-yard rush (1-pt Conversion Good by Cam'Ron Harris), 2:06. Defenders 37–15. Drive: 9 Plays, 67 Yards, 3:59.
- SEA – Juwan Green 8-yard pass from Ben DiNucci (3-pt Conversion No Good), 0:12. Defenders 37–21. Drive: 10 Plays, 64 Yards, 1:54.

Top passers

- SEA – Ben DiNucci – 31/48, 295 yards, 3 TD
- DC – Jordan Ta'amu – 19/31, 258 yards, 2 TD

Top rushers

- SEA – Ben DiNucci – 3 rushes, 16 yards
- DC – Abram Smith – 23 rushes, 48 yards

Top receivers

- SEA – Juwan Green – 8 receptions, 89 yards
- DC – Josh Hammond – 6 receptions, 55 yards

== Staff ==
Seattle Sea Dragons staff
Front office: Director of team operations – Pat Mathews; Director of player personnel – Randy Mueller; Head coach: General manager/Head coach – Jim Haslett; Offensive coaches: Offensive coordinator – June Jones; Quarterbacks - Dan Morrison; Running backs - Wes Suan; Wide Receivers/Special Teams - Ty Knott; Offensive Line - Dennis McKnight	Defensive coaches: Defensive coordinator – Ron Zook; Defensive Line - Chip Garber; Linebackers - Matt Fleischacker; Defensive Backs - Mike Gillhamer; Safeties/Quality Control - Aaron McGinty; Team operations: Athletic Trainer – Scottie Patton; Equipment Manager – Trevor Pueblo; Video Manager - Drew Scharenbroch
