= 2023 Orlando Guardians season =

American professional football season

- Owner: Alpha Acquico, LLC
- General manager: Terrell Buckley
- Head coach: Terrell Buckley
- Home stadium: Camping World Stadium

Results
- Record: 1–9
- Division place: 4th XFL South
- Playoffs: Did not qualify

The 2023 Orlando Guardians season was the second season for the Orlando Guardians as a professional American football franchise. They played as charter members of the XFL, one of eight teams to compete in the league for the 2023 season. The Guardians played their home games at the Camping World Stadium and were led by head coach Terrell Buckley.

The franchise also relocated from East Rutherford, New Jersey to Orlando, Florida prior to the season, changing their name from New York Guardians to Orlando Guardians.

On January 1, 2024, it was announced that the 2023 season was the last season for the Guardians.

== Roster changes ==
On March 3, 2023, the Guardians released quarterback Quinten Dormady after he allegedly gave the San Antonio Brahmas plays from the Guardians' playbook prior to the two teams' week 2 matchup. He was reinstated a day later, on March 4, 2023, when the league released a statement saying they would be investigating into the situation. He was subsequently placed on the team's reserve list. After undergoing a third party investigation, it was found that there was no substantial proof behind the allegations, and Dormandy was added back to the active roster.

== Final roster ==
2023 Orlando Guardians final roster
Quarterbacks: 12 Quinten Dormady; 5 Quinton Flowers; 3 Deondre Francois; Running backs: 26 Devin Darrington; 30 Jah-Maine Martin; Wide receivers: 15 K. D. Cannon; 18 Andrew Jamiel; 11 Cody Latimer; 14 Charleston Rambo; 17 Eli Rogers; 10 Deddrick Thomas; 83 Dan Williams; Tight ends: 80 Ryan Becker LS; 87 Logan Carter; 39 Jaylen Smith; 81 Jordan Thomas	Offensive linemen: 77 Abdul Beecham T/G; 67 Brett Boyko T; 78 T. J. Bradley T; 65 Jordan Ighofose G; 59 Zeveyon Furcron C/G; 64 Fred Lauina G; 55 David Moore G; 58 Jalen Spady C; Defensive linemen: 48 Ja'Quain Blakely DE; 34 Nick Coe DE; 36 JaCoby Jones DE; 56 Stansly Maponga DE; 88 Caeveon Patton DT/DE; 99 Trevon Sanders DT; 92 Dalyn Wade-Perry DT; 9 Gerald Willis DT	Linebackers: 41 Jeremiah Gemmel MLB; 31 Lakia Henry OLB; 44 Terrance Plummer MLB; 46 Tegray Scales OLB; 8 Terrance Smith 0LB; 40 Erroll Thompson MLB; Defensive backs: 20 Baylen Buchanan CB; 22 Matt Elam SS; 1 C. J. Holmes CB; 23 Najeem Hosein FS; 13 Mike Lee FS/SS; 38 Marcus Murphy SS; 32 Justin Rogers FS; 27 Tye Smith CB; 29 Trumaine Washington CB; 21 Shaq Wiggins CB; Special teams: 0 José Borregales K; 19 Mac Brown P; 53 Cameron Kaye LS	Reserve lists: -- DeCalon Brooks ILB (IR); 25 Josh Harvey-Clemons OLB (IR); 4 Lance Lenoir WR (IR); -- Shawn Page G (IR); 72 TJ Storment T (IR); 19 Johnny Townsend P (IR); -- Dee Virgin CB (Did Not Report); -- Tyler Williams CB (IR); 51 active, 8 inactive

== Schedule ==
All times Eastern

Week	Day	Date	Kickoff	TV	Opponent	Results		Location	Attendance
Week	Day	Date	Kickoff	TV	Opponent	Score	Record	Location	Attendance
1	Saturday	February 18	8:30 p.m.	ESPN/FX	at Houston Roughnecks	12–33	0–1	TDECU Stadium	12,784
2	Sunday	February 26	4:00 p.m.	ESPN	San Antonio Brahmas	12–30	0–2	Camping World Stadium	12,011
3	Sunday	March 5	4:00 p.m.	FX	at Arlington Renegades	9–10	0–3	Choctaw Stadium	12,006
4	Saturday	March 11	7:00 p.m.	FX	Houston Roughnecks	16–44	0–4	Camping World Stadium	10,013
5	Saturday	March 18	10:00 p.m.	FX	at Vegas Vipers	32–35	0–5	Cashman Field	6,008
6	Saturday	March 25	1:00 p.m.	ABC	Seattle Sea Dragons	19–26	0–6	Camping World Stadium	7,832
7	Saturday	April 1	6:00 p.m.	ESPN	DC Defenders	37–36	1–6	Camping World Stadium	7,011
8	Saturday	April 8	4:00 p.m.	ESPN	Arlington Renegades	16–18	1–7	Camping World Stadium	7,789
9	Saturday	April 15	7:00 p.m.	ESPN2	at San Antonio Brahmas	23–25	1–8	Alamodome	13,023
10	Saturday	April 22	12:00 p.m.	ESPN	at St. Louis BattleHawks	28–53	1–9	The Dome at America's Center	33,034

=== Game summaries ===
==== Week 1: at Houston Roughnecks ====
Week 1: Orlando Guardians at Houston Roughnecks – Game summary

Quarter	1	2	3	4	Total
Guardians	6	0	0	6	12
Roughnecks	6	15	0	12	33

at TDECU Stadium, Houston, Texas

- Date: February 18
- Game time: 8:30 p.m. EDT
- Game weather: 51 °F (11 °C)
- Game attendance: 12,784
- Referee: Chris Coyte
- TV announcers (ESPN): Lowell Galindo, Sam Acho, and Taylor McGregor

Game information

First quarter

- ORL – Cody Latimer 27-yard pass from Paxton Lynch (2-pt Conversion No Good), 10:01. Guardians 6-0. Drive: 10 plays, 77 yards, 4:59.
- HOU – Jontre Kirklin 10-yard pass from Brandon Silvers (1-pt Conversion No Good), 2:22. Tied 6-6. Drive: 7 plays, 52 yards, 3:22.

Second quarter

- HOU – Deontay Burnett 46-yard pass from Brandon Silvers (1-pt Conversion No Good), 10:59. Roughnecks 12-6. Drive: 6 plays, 70 yards, 2:41.
- HOU – Max Borghi 27-yard run (1-pt Conversion No Good), 6:04. Chargers Roughnecks 18-6. Drive: 5 plays, 42 yards, 2:28.
- HOU – Hunter Duplessis 33-yard field goal, 1:52. Roughnecks 21-6. Drive: 6 plays, 47 yards, 2:21.

Third quarter

- No Scoring Plays.

Fourth quarter

- HOU – Hunter Duplessis 33-yard field goal, 10:18. Tied 24–6. Drive: 9 plays, 44 yards, 4:36.
- ORL – Andrew Jamiel 51-yard pass from Quinten Dormady (3-pt Conversion No Good), 10:29. Roughnecks 24-12. Drive: 8 plays, 76 yards, 3:30.
- HOU – Cole McDonald 5-yard rush (1-pt Conversion No Good), 3:08. Chargers 30-12. Drive: 4 plays, 13 yards, 1:43.
- HOU – Hunter Duplessis 22-yard field goal, 1:23. Roughnecks 33-12. Drive: 4 plays, 5 yards, 0:30.

Top passers

- ORL – Quinten Dormady – 12/18, 142 yards, 1 TD, 2 INT
- HOU – Brandon Silvers – 26/42, 272 yards, 2 TD, 2 INT

Top rushers

- ORL – Jah-Maine Martin – 9 rushes, 41 yards
- HOU – Max Borghi – 8 rushes, 42 yards

Top receivers

- ORL – Andrew Jamiel – 3 receptions, 80 yards
- HOU – Deontay Burnett – 8 receptions, 90 yards

==== Week 2: vs. San Antonio Brahmas ====
Week 2: San Antonio Brahmas at Orlando Guardians – Game summary

Quarter	1	2	3	4	Total
Brahmas	6	7	14	3	30
Guardians	6	0	0	6	12

at Camping World Stadium, Orlando, Florida

- Date: February 26
- Game time: 4:00 p.m. EDT
- Game weather: 86 °F (30 °C)
- Game attendance: 12,011
- Referee: Mike Vandervelde
- TV announcers (ESPN): Tom Hart, Greg McElroy, and Cole Cubelic

Game information

First quarter

- SA – Deon Yelder 3-yard pass from Jack Coan (2-pt Conversion No Good), 9:31. Brahmas 6–0. Drive: 9 plays, 45 yards, 5:29.
- ORL – Eli Rogers 8-yard pass from Paxton Lynch (1-pt Conversion No Good), 5:19. Tied 6–6. Drive: 7 plays, 67 yards, 4:12.

Second quarter

- SA – Alize Mack 19-yard pass from Jack Coan (1-pt Conversion Good by T. J. Vasher), 1:01. Brahmas 13–6. Drive: 9 plays, 77 yards, 2:24.

Third quarter

- SA – Jalen Tolliver 24-yard pass from Jack Coan (1-pt Conversion Good by Deon Yelder), 8:50. Brahmas 20–6. Drive: 8 Plays, 75 Yards, 4:25.
- SA – Alize Mack 7-yard pass from Jack Coan (1-pt Conversion Good by Jon Hilliman), 6:42. Brahmas 27–6. Drive: 2 Plays, 8 Yards, 0:19.

Fourth quarter

- ORL – Cody Latimer 4-yard pass from Deondre Francois (2-pt Conversion No Good), 12:45. Brahmas 27–12. Drive: 13 Plays, 90 Yards, 8:57.
- SA – John Parker Romo 40-yard field goal, 4:40. Brahmas 30–12. Drive: 7 Plays, -1 Yards, 4:07.

Top passers

- SA – Jack Coan – 16/24, 165 yards, 3 TD
- ORL – Paxton Lynch – 9/19, 79 yards, 1 TD

Top rushers

- SA – Kalen Ballage – 12 rushes, 23 yards
- ORL – Jah-Maine Martin – 9 rushes, 46 yards

Top receivers

- SA – Alize Mack – 4 receptions, 48 yards, 1 TD
- ORL – JaVonta Payton – 3 receptions, 47 yards

==== Week 3: at Arlington Renegades ====
Week 3: Orlando Guardians at Arlington Renegades – Game summary

Quarter	1	2	3	4	Total
Guardians	3	0	0	6	9
Renegades	3	0	0	7	10

at Choctaw Stadium, Arlington, Texas

- Date: March 5
- Game time: 4:00 p.m. EDT
- Game weather: 77 °F (25 °C)
- Game attendance: 12,006
- Referee: Francisco Villar
- TV announcers (FX): Lowell Galindo, Sam Acho, and Taylor McGregor

Game information

First quarter

- ORL – José Borregales 35-yard field goal, 7:38. Guardians 3–0. Drive: 12 Plays, 48 Yards, 7:22.
- ARL – Taylor Russolino 21-yard field goal, 0:40. Tied 3–3. Drive: 6 Plays, 13 Yards, 2:30.

Second quarter

Third quarter

Fourth quarter

- ORL – Paxton Lynch 3-yard rush (1-pt Conversion No Good), 14:56. Guardians 9–3. Drive: 11 Plays, 73 Yards, 4:58.
- ARL – Tyler Vaughns 17-yard pass from Kyle Sloter (1-pt Conversion Good by De'Veon Smith), 7:58. Renegades 10–9. Drive: 12 Plays, 74 Yards, 21:57.

Top passers

- ORL – Paxton Lynch – 19/31, 219 yards, 0 TD
- ARL – Kyle Sloter – 18/23, 124 yards, 1 TD

Top rushers

- ORL – Paxton Lynch – 10 rushes, 43 yards
- ARL – De'Veon Smith – 18 rushes, 49 yards

Top receivers

- ORL – Cody Latimer – 6 receptions, 66 yards
- ARL – Tyler Vaughns – 5 receptions, 39 yards

==== Week 4: vs. Houston Roughnecks ====
Week 4: Houston Roughnecks at Orlando Guardians – Game summary

Quarter	1	2	3	4	Total
Roughnecks	20	6	6	12	44
Guardians	0	10	6	0	16

at Camping World Stadium, Orlando, Florida

- Date: March 11
- Game time: 7:00 p.m. EDT
- Game weather: 76 °F (24 °C)
- Game attendance: 10,013
- Referee: Reggie Smith
- TV announcers (FX): John Schriffen, Tom Luginbill, and Stormy Buonantony

Game information

First quarter

- HOU – Travell Harris 21-yard pass from Brandon Silvers (2-pt Conversion No Good), 11:10. Roughnecks 6–0. Drive: 7 Plays, 52 Yards, 3:50.
- HOU – Fumble recovery returned for touchdown by William Likely (2-pt Conversion Good by Jontre Kirkland), 9:53. Roughnecks 14–0. Drive: 3 Plays, 27 Yards, 1:17.
- HOU – Deontay Burnett 49-yard pass from Jontre Kirklin (2-pt Conversion No Good), 4:15. Roughnecks 20–0. Drive: 5 Plays, 66 Yards, 2:44.

Second quarter

- ORL – José Borregales 33-yard field goal, 9:16. Roughnecks 20–3. Drive: 10 Plays, 35 Yards, 5:20.
- HOU – Jontre Kirklin 42-yard pass from Brandon Silvers (2-pt Conversion No Good), 1:01. Roughnecks 26–3. Drive: 1 Play, 39 Yards, 0:07.
- ORL – Jaylen Smith 31-yard pass from Paxton Lynch (1-pt Conversion Good by Charleston Rambo), 0:39. Roughnecks 26–10. Drive: 2 Plays, 30 Yards, 0:22.

Third quarter

- ORL – Charleston Rambo 81-yard pass from Paxton Lynch (2-pt Conversion No Good), 10:50. Roughnecks 26–16. Drive: 1 Play, 78 Yards, 0:11.
- HOU – Dejoun Lee 1-yard rush (2-pt Conversion No Good), 2:08. Roughnecks 32–16. Drive: 8 Plays, 71 Yards, 4:34.

Fourth quarter

- HOU – Travell Harris 59-yard pass from Brandon Silvers (2-pt Conversion No Good), 10:57. Roughnecks 38–16. Drive: 3 Plays, 57 Yards, 1:57.
- HOU – Dejoun Lee 1-yard rush (2-pt Conversion No Good), 3:40. Roughnecks 44–16. Drive: 8 Plays, 61 Yards, 4:17.

Top passers

- HOU – Brandon Silvers – 24/30, 239 yards, 3 TD
- ORL – Paxton Lynch – 18/30, 267 yards, 2 TD

Top rushers

- HOU – Dejoun Lee – 6 rushes, 45 yards
- ORL – Devin Darrington – 12 rushes, 40 yards

Top receivers

- HOU – Travell Harris – 3 receptions, 83 yards
- ORL – Cody Latimer – 4 receptions, 57 yards

==== Week 5: at Vegas Vipers ====
Week 5: Orlando Guardians at Vegas Vipers – Game summary

Quarter	1	2	3	4	Total
Guardians	7	6	6	13	32
Vipers	8	9	6	12	35

at Cashman Field, Las Vegas, Nevada

- Date: March 18
- Game time: 10:00 p.m. EDT
- Game weather: 62 °F (17 °C)
- Game attendance: 6,008
- Referee: Mike Vandervelde
- TV announcers (FX): Matt Barrie, Joey Galloway, and Tiffany Blackmon

Game information

First quarter

- ORL – Quinton Flowers 1-yard rush (1-pt Conversion Good by Jah-Maine Martin), 8:25. Guardians 7–0. Drive: 13 Plays, 67 Yards, 6:35.
- VGS – Jeff Badet 35-yard pass from Luis Perez (2-pt Conversion Good by Rod Smith), 2:59. Vipers 8–7. Drive: 3 Plays, 40 Yards, 1:14.

Second quarter

- VGS – Sean Price 3-yard pass from Luis Perez (2-pt Conversion No Good), 10:44. Vipers 14–7. Drive: 5 Plays, 63 Yards, 2:47.
- VGS – Bailey Giffen 39-yard field goal. Vipers 17–7. Drive: 8 Plays, 45 Yards, 4:50.
- ORL – Charleston Rambo 25-yard pass from Quinten Dormady (1-pt Conversion No Good), 0:50. Vipers 17–13. Drive: 10 Plays, 71 Yards, 3:42.

Third quarter

- VGS – Rod Smith 1-yard rush (2-pt Conversion No Good), 9:53. Vipers 23–13. Drive: 9 Plays, 53 Yards, 5:07.
- ORL – Jah-Maine Martin 2-yard rush (2-pt Conversion No Good), 5:07. Vipers 23–19. Drive: 11 Plays, 73 Yards, 4:47.

Fourth quarter

- VGS – Rod Smith 1-yard rush (1-pt Conversion No Good), 14:57. Vipers 29–19. Drive: 10 Plays, 71 Yards, 5:10.
- ORL – Devin Darrington 2-yard rush (1-pt Conversion Good by Devin Darrington), 12:24. Vipers 29–26. Drive: 6 Plays, 73 Yards, 2:34.
- VGS – Jeff Badet 25-yard pass from Luis Perez (1-pt Conversion No Good), 6:26. Vipers 35–26. Drive: 10 Plays, 87 Yards, 5:57.
- ORL – Cody Latimer 45-yard pass from Quinten Dormady (3-pt Conversion No Good), 1:12. Vipers 35–32. Drive: 3 Plays, 61 Yards, 0:39.

Top passers

- ORL – Quinten Dormady – 22/25, 256 yards, 2 TD
- VGS – Luis Perez – 20/28, 269 yards, 3 TD

Top rushers

- ORL – Jah-Maine Martin – 9 rushes, 36 yards
- VGS – Rod Smith – 18 rushes, 62 yards

Top receivers

- ORL – Cody Latimer – 8 receptions, 124 yards
- VGS – Jeff Badet – 5 receptions, 80 yards

==== Week 6: vs. Seattle Sea Dragons ====
Week 6: Seattle Sea Dragons at Orlando Guardians – Game summary

Quarter	1	2	3	4	Total
Sea Dragons	3	6	8	9	26
Guardians	0	10	6	3	19

at Camping World Stadium, Orlando, Florida

- Date: March 25
- Game time: 1:00 p.m. EDT
- Game weather: 83 °F (28 °C)
- Game attendance: 7,832
- Referee: Francisco Villar
- TV announcers (ABC): Roy Philpott, Joey Galloway, and Tiffany Blackmon

Game information

First quarter

- SEA – Dominik Eberle 37-yard field goal, 6:03. Sea Dragons 3–0 Drive: 7 Plays, 24 Yards, 4:09.

Second quarter

- ORL – José Borregales 26-yard field goal, 12:17. Tied 3–3. Drive: 7 Plays, 43 Yards, 3:26.
- SEA – Dominik Eberle 27-yard field goal, 8:23. Sea Dragons 6–3. Drive: 7 Plays, 14 Yards, 3:54.
- ORL – Devin Darrington 3-yard rush (1-pt Conversion Good by Devin Darrington), 2:16. Guardians 10–6. Drive: 12 Plays, 65 Yards, 5:55.
- SEA – Dominik Eberle 54-yard field goal, 0:06. Guardians 10–9. Drive: 4 Plays, 29 Yards, 0:24.

Third quarter

- SEA – Blake Jackson 20-yard pass from Ben DiNucci (2-pt Conversion Good by Jahcour Pearson), 7:01. Sea Dragons 17–10. Drive: 6 Plays, 65 Yards, 2:55.
- ORL – Devin Darrington 43-yard rush (2-pt Conversion No Good), 4:44. Sea Dragons 17–16. Drive: 6 Plays, 73 Yards, 2:17.

Fourth quarter

- SEA – Dominik Eberle 27-yard field goal, 13:49. Sea Dragons 20–16. Drive: 11 Plays, 61 Yards, 5:55.
- ORL – José Borregales 50-yard field goal, 11:44. Sea Dragons 20–19. Drive: 5 Plays, 51 Yards, 2:05.
- SEA – Juwan Green 4-yard pass from Ben DiNucci (2-pt Conversion No Good), 6:00. Sea Dragons 26–19. Drive: 3 Plays, 6 Yards, 1:14.

Top passers

- SEA – Ben DiNucci – 18/35, 177 yards, 2 TD
- ORL – Quinten Dormady – 24/44, 243 yards, 0 TD

Top rushers

- SEA – Darius Bradwell – 12 rushes, 32 yards
- ORL – Jah-Maine Martin – 10 rushes, 37 yards

Top receivers

- SEA – Blake Jackson – 6 receptions, 79 yards
- ORL – Charleston Rambo – 6 receptions, 54 yards

==== Week 7: vs. DC Defenders ====
Week 7: DC Defenders at Orlando Guardians – Game summary

Quarter	1	2	3	4	Total
Defenders	14	8	6	8	36
Guardians	12	6	13	6	37

at Camping World Stadium, Orlando, Florida

- Date: April 1
- Game time: 6:00 p.m. EDT
- Game weather: 85 °F (29 °C)
- Game attendance: 7,011
- Referee: Chris Coyte
- TV announcers (FX): John Schriffen, Tom Luginbill, and Harry Douglas

Game information

First quarter

- DC – Lucky Jackson 32-yard pass from Jordan Ta'amu (2-pt Conversion Good by Chris Blair), 13:08. Defenders 8–0. Drive: 5 Plays, 74 Yards, 1:52.
- ORL – Quinten Dormady 1-yard rush (1-pt Conversion No Good), 10:47. Defenders 8–6. Drive: 6 Plays, 45 Yards, 2:21.
- ORL – K. D. Cannon 41-yard pass from Quinten Dormady (1-pt Conversion No Good), 8:01. Guardians 12–8. Drive: 3 Plays, 58 Yards, 1:09.
- DC – Abram Smith 1-yard rush (2-pt Conversion No Good), 3:14. Defenders 14–12. Drive: 11 Plays, 69 Yards, 4:40.

Second quarter

- DC – Briley Moore 12-yard pass from D'Eriq King (2-pt Conversion Good by Alex Ellis), 13:00. Defenders 22–12. Drive: 9 Plays, 48 Yards, 3:20.
- ORL – Quinten Dormady 1-yard rush (2-pt Conversion No Good), 0:00. Defenders 22–18. Drive: 9 Plays, 55 Yards, 4:19.

Third quarter

- ORL – Jordan Thomas 15-yard pass from Quinten Dormady (1-pt Conversion Good by Jah-Maine Martin), 9:38. Guardians 25–22. Drive: 9 Plays, 46 Yards, 5:22.
- DC – Chris Blair 86-yard pass from Jordan Ta'amu (2-pt Conversion No Good), 8:29. Defenders 28–25. Drive: 3 Plays, 85 Yards, 1:09.
- ORL – Quinten Dormady 1-yard rush (1-pt Conversion No Good), 3:31. Guardians 31–28. Drive: 10 Plays, 60 Yards, 4:58.

Fourth quarter

- DC – Lucky Jackson 15-yard pass from Jordan Ta'amu (2-pt Conversion Good by Alex Ellis), 11:37. Defenders 36–31. Drive: 5 Plays, 50 Yards, 1:39.
- ORL – Cody Latimer 44-yard pass from Quinten Dormady (2-pt Conversion No Good), 8:50. Guardians 37–36. Drive: 6 Plays, 65 Yards, 2:47.

Top passers

- DC – Jordan Ta'amu – 21/29, 285 yards, 3 TD
- ORL – Quinten Dormady – 27/34, 328 yards, 3 TD

Top rushers

- DC – Abram Smith – 18 rushes, 127 yards
- ORL – Devin Darrington – 13 rushes, 17 yards

Top receivers

- DC – Chris Blair – 5 receptions, 139 yards
- ORL – Cody Latimer – 7 receptions, 93 yards

This was the Guardians only win of the season, knocking off the previously undefeated DC Defenders.

==== Week 8: vs. Arlington Renegades ====
Week 8: Arlington Renegades at Orlando Guardians – Game summary

Quarter	1	2	3	4	Total
Renegades	9	3	6	0	18
Guardians	3	6	0	7	16

at Camping World Stadium, Orlando, Florida

- Date: April 8
- Game time: 4:00 p.m. EDT
- Game weather: 86 °F (30 °C)
- Game attendance: 7,789
- Referee: Jeff Heaser
- TV announcers (ESPN): John Schriffen, Tom Luginbill, and Stormy Buonantony

Game information

First quarter

- ARL – Taylor Russolino 23-yard field goal, 7:50. Renegades 3–0. Drive: 13 Plays, 60 Yards, 7:10.
- ORL – José Borregales 24-yard field goal, 4:30. Tied 3–3. Drive: 4 Plays, 2 Yards, 1:30.
- ARL – Fumble recovery returned for touchdown by De'Vante Bausby, 1:05. Renegades 9–3. Drive: 2 Plays, -1 Yards, 0:41.

Second quarter

- ARL – Taylor Russolino 31-yard field goal, 11:23. Renegades 12–3. Drive: 5 Plays, 32 Yards, 2:53.
- ORL – Quinten Dormady 2-yard rush (1-pt Conversion No Good), 0:50. Renegades 12–9. Drive: 8 Plays, 69 Yards, 2:45.

Third quarter

- ARL – De'Veon Smith 1-yard rush (1-pt Conversion No Good), 0:19. Renegades 18–9. Drive: 5 Plays, 22 Yards, 3:04.

Fourth quarter

- ORL – Eli Rogers 19-yard pass from Quinten Dormady (1-pt Conversion Good by Jah-Maine Martin), 3:54. Renegades 18–16. Drive: 6 Plays, 78 Yards, 2:15.

Top passers

- ARL – Luis Perez – 16/25, 190 yards, 0 TD
- ORL – Quinten Dormady – 28/43, 303 yards, 1 TD

Top rushers

- ARL – De'Veon Smith – 13 rushes, 44 yards
- ORL – Devin Darrington – 7 rushes, 5 yards

Top receivers

- ARL – Tyler Vaughns – 4 receptions, 52 yards
- ORL – Eli Rogers – 10 receptions, 135 yards

==== Week 9: at San Antonio Brahmas ====
Week 9: Orlando Guardians at San Antonio Brahmas – Game summary

Quarter	1	2	3	4	Total
Guardians	8	6	0	9	23
Brahmas	0	10	9	6	25

at Alamodome, San Antonio, Texas

- Date: April 15
- Game time: 7:00 p.m. EDT
- Game weather: 95 °F (35 °C)
- Game attendance: 13,023
- Referee: Jason Autrey
- TV announcers (ESPN2): Lowell Galindo, Sam Acho, and Ian Fitzsimmons

Game information

First quarter

- ORL – Jordan Thomas 4-yard pass from Quinten Dormady (2-pt Conversion Good by Jordan Thomas), 11:34. Guardians 8–0. Drive: 6 Plays, 73 Yards, 3:26.

Second quarter

- SA – Parker Romo 38-yard field goal, 14:21. Guardians 8–3. Drive: 12 Plays, 45 Yards, 6:18.
- ORL – Devin Darrington 1-yard rush (1-pt Conversion No Good), 10:36. Guardians 14–3. Drive: 7 Plays, 78 Yards, 3:41.
- SA – Jacques Patrick 6-yard rush (1-pt Conversion Good by Jacques Patrick), 0:27. Guardians 14–10. Drive: 6 Plays, 78 Yards, 1:12.

Third quarter

- SA – Parker Romo 29-yard field goal, 8:19. Guardians 14–13. Drive: 12 Plays, 75 Yards, 6:41.
- SA – Travis Toivonen 28-yard pass from Jack Coan (2-pt Conversion No Good), 2:08. Brahmas 19–14. Drive: 6 Plays, 72 Yards, 3:29.

Fourth quarter

- ORL – José Borregales 52-yard field goal, 10:46. Brahmas 19–17. Drive: 7 Plays, 28 Yards, 3:24.
- SA – Pass intercepted by Drew Beesley returned for touchdown, 7:07. Brahmas 25–17. Drive: 2 Plays, 20 Yards, 1:42.
- ORL – Deondre Francois 3-yard pass to Andrew Jamiel (2-pt Conversion No Good), 3:55. Brahmas 25–23. Drive: 6 Plays, 72 Yards, 3:12.

Top passers

- ORL – Quinten Dormady – 9/17, 47 yards, 1 TD
- SA – Jack Coan – 25/31, 302 yards, 1 TD

Top rushers

- ORL – Devin Darrington – 16 rushes, 133 yards
- SA – Jacques Patrick – 20 rushes, 80 yards

Top receivers

- ORL – Ryan Becker – 2 receptions, 17 yards
- SA – Jon Hilliman – 6 receptions, 47 yards

==== Week 10: at St. Louis BattleHawks ====
Week 10: Orlando Guardians at St. Louis BattleHawks – Game summary

Quarter	1	2	3	4	Total
Guardians	6	14	0	8	28
BattleHawks	3	22	14	14	53

at The Dome at America's Center, St. Louis, Missouri

- Date: April 22
- Game time: 12:00 p.m. EDT
- Game weather: 46 °F (8 °C)
- Game attendance: 33,034
- Referee: Michael Vandervelde
- TV announcers (ESPN): Lowell Galindo, Sam Acho, and Taylor McGregor

Game information

First quarter

- ORL – Andrew Jamiel 27-yard pass from Deondre Francois (1-pt Conversion No Good), 5:15. Guardians 6–0. Drive: 11 Plays, 79 Yards, 6:33.
- STL – Donny Hageman 35-yard field goal, 2:25. Guardians 6–3. Drive: 6 Plays, 41 Yards, 2:50.

Second quarter

- STL – Kareem Walker 1-yard rush (2-pt Conversion No Good), 12:27. BattleHawks 9–6. Drive: 7 Plays, 42 Yards, 3:14.
- ORL – Jordan Thomas 84-yard pass from Mac Brown (2-pt Conversion No Good), 9:35. Guardians 12–9. Drive: 4 Plays, 73 Yards, 2:52.
- STL – Hakeem Butler 7-yard pass from A. J. McCarron (2-pt Conversion Good by Marcell Ateman), 6:36. BattleHawks 17–12. Drive: 6 Plays, 70 Yards, 2:59.
- ORL – K. D. Cannon 45-yard pass from Quinten Dormady (2-pt Conversion Good by Andrew Jamiel), 6:19. Guardians 20–17. Drive: 1 Play, 45 Yards, 0:17.
- STL – Jake Sutherland 5-yard pass from A. J. McCarron (2-pt Conversion Good by Hakeem Butler), 0:55. BattleHawks 25–20. Drive: 10 Plays, 66 Yards, 5:24.

Third quarter

- STL – Steven Mitchell 13-yard pass from A. J. McCarron (2-pt Conversion Good by Steven Mitchell), 9:32. BattleHawks 33–20. Drive: 6 Plays, 68 Yards, 2:57.
- STL – Hakeem Butler 66-yard pass from A. J. McCarron (3-pt Conversion No Good), 4:08. BattleHawks 39–20. Drive: 2 Plays, 67 Yards, 0:46.

Fourth quarter

- STL – Darrius Shepherd 4-yard pass from A. J. McCarron (2-pt Conversion No Good), 10:55. BattleHawks 45–20. Drive: 5 Plays, 57 Yards, 2:31.
- ORL – Charleston Rambo 6-yard pass from Quinten Dormady (2-pt Conversion Good by K. D. Cannon), 5:10. BattleHawks 45–28. Drive: 13 Plays, 65 Yards, 5:45.
- STL – Steven Mitchell 16-yard pass from A. J. McCarron (2-pt Conversion Good by Hakeem Butler), 1:55. BattleHawks 53–28. Drive: 6 Plays, 39 Yards, 3:15.

Top passers

- ORL – Quinten Dormady – 18/24, 187 yards, 2 TD
- STL – A. J. McCarron – 28/35, 420 yards, 6 TD

Top rushers

- ORL – Devin Darrington – 6 rushes, 0 yards
- STL – Mataeo Durant – 8 rushes, 36 yards

Top receivers

- ORL – Charleston Rambo – 5 receptions, 57 yards
- STL – Hakeem Butler – 9 receptions, 164 yards

== Standings ==
2023 XFL standings
North Division
Team	W	L	PCT	GB	TD+/-	TD+	TD-	DIV	PF	PA	DIFF	STK
(y) DC Defenders	9	1	.900	–	-2	33	35	6–0	298	240	58	W3
(x) Seattle Sea Dragons	7	3	.700	2	+10	30	20	3–3	243	177	66	W2
(e) St. Louis Battlehawks	7	3	.700	2	+9	32	23	3–3	249	202	47	W1
(e) Vegas Vipers	2	8	.200	7	0	28	28	0–6	184	252	-68	L3
South Division
Team	W	L	PCT	GB	TD+/-	TD+	TD-	DIV	PF	PA	DIFF	STK
(y) Houston Roughnecks	7	3	.700	–	+4	30	26	6–0	247	182	65	W3
(x) Arlington Renegades	4	6	.400	3	-8	15	23	3–3	146	194	-48	L2
(e) San Antonio Brahmas	3	7	.300	4	-8	16	24	3–3	169	183	-14	L1
(e) Orlando Guardians	1	9	.100	6	-5	32	37	0–6	204	310	-106	L3
(x)–clinched playoff berth; (y)–clinched division; (e)–eliminated from playoff contention

== Staff ==
Orlando Guardians staff
Front office: Director of team operations – Patrick Austin; Director of player personnel – Larry Lee; Head coach: General manager/Head coach – Terrell Buckley; Offensive coaches: Offensive coordinator/Running backs – Robert Ford; Wide Receivers/Asst. Head Coach/Special Teams – Lamar Thomas; Quarterbacks – Shane Matthews; Tight Ends – Brett Johnson; Offensive Line – Keith Wagner	Defensive coaches: Defensive coordinator/Cornerbacks – Tony Carter; Defensive Line/Linebackers – Mark Snyder; Defensive Backs – Devin Bush Sr.; Safeties – Ronnie Lee; Team operations: Quality Control - Chris Stamps; Athletic trainer – Rachel Sharpe; Equipment manager – Bobby Monica; Video manager – Ben Lawson

*Defensive Line coach Ty Warren was no longer on the Staff after Week 5. Mark Snyder took over Week 6.

*After week 5, Devin Bush Sr. was added to the coaching stuff as a defensive analyst.
