= Jahcour Pearson =

American football player (born 1998)

DC Defenders
- Position: Wide receiver
- Roster status: Active

Personal information
- Born: April 25, 1998 (age 28); Broward County, Florida, U.S.
- Listed height: 5 ft 7 in (1.70 m)
- Listed weight: 182 lb (83 kg)

Career information
- High school: Charles W. Flanagan (Pembroke Pines, Florida)
- College: Western Kentucky (2016–2020); Ole Miss (2021)
- NFL draft: 2022: undrafted

Career history
- Seattle Sea Dragons (2023); St. Louis Battlehawks (2024–2026); DC Defenders (2027–present)

Awards and highlights
- All-UFL Team (2025); All-XFL Team (2023); XFL receiving yards leader (2023); XFL receptions leader (2023); Second-team All-CUSA (2019)

Career UFL statistics as of 2025
- Receptions: 56
- Receiving yards: 435
- Receiving touchdowns: 2

Jahcour Pearson (born April 25, 1998) is an American professional football wide receiver for the DC Defenders of the United Football League (UFL). He played college football for the Western Kentucky Hilltoppers before transferring to the Ole Miss Rebels.

== Early life ==
Pearson attended Charles W. Flanagan High School. As a senior, he recorded 43 catches for 645 yards and six touchdowns and helped the team win its first state championship. Pearson was selected to the All-Broward Team. He was ranked as a three-star recruit by 247Sports.com and a two-star by Scout.com, Rivals.com, and ESPN. Pearson eventually committed to Western Kentucky.

College recruiting
| Name | Hometown | School | Height | Weight | Commit date |
|---|---|---|---|---|---|
| Jahcour Pearson; WR | Pompano Beach, Florida | Charles W. Flanagan | 5 ft 8 in (1.73 m) | 170 lb (77 kg) | Jan 29, 2016 |
| Jahcour Pearson; WR | Recruit ratings: Scout: Rivals: 247Sports: ESPN: (68) | | | | |

== College career ==
=== Western Kentucky ===
After redshirting in 2016, Pearson finished the 2017 season with seven receptions for 40 yards. Pearson appeared in eight games in 2018, starting in two of them. He caught 13 passes for 132 yards. In his final full season at WKU, Pearson caught 75 passes for 804 yards and seven touchdowns. In 2020, he played in two games for WKU before announcing he would be transferring to Ole Miss. He ended his career at Western Kentucky with 105 receptions, 1,072 receiving yards, and seven receiving touchdowns.

=== Ole Miss ===
Using the extra year of eligibility given to players from the 2020 COVID-19 season, Pearson played in 10 games in 2021, catching 26 receptions for 392 receiving yards. Pearson also made the Athletic Director's Honor Roll in the spring of 2021. After the season, Pearson declared for the 2022 NFL draft.

=== College statistics ===
| Year | Team | GP | Receiving | | | |
| Year | Team | GP | Rec | Yds | Avg | TD |
|---|---|---|---|---|---|---|
| 2016 | Western Kentucky | 0 | (redshirt) Redshirted | | | |
| 2017 | Western Kentucky | 6 | 7 | 40 | 5.7 | 0 |
| 2018 | Western Kentucky | 8 | 13 | 132 | 10.2 | 0 |
| 2019 | Western Kentucky | 13 | 76 | 804 | 10.6 | 7 |
| 2020 | Western Kentucky | 2 | 9 | 96 | 10.7 | 0 |
| 2021 | Ole Miss | 10 | 26 | 392 | 15.1 | 0 |
| Career | | 40 | 131 | 1,464 | 11.2 | 7 |

== Professional career ==
=== Pre-draft ===
Pre-draft measurables
| Height | Weight | Arm length | Hand span | Wingspan | 40-yard dash | 10-yard split | 20-yard split | 20-yard shuttle | Three-cone drill | Vertical jump | Broad jump | Bench press |
|---|---|---|---|---|---|---|---|---|---|---|---|---|
| 5 ft 7 3/8 in (1.71 m) | 178 lb (81 kg) | 29 7/8 in (0.76 m) | 8 1/4 in (0.21 m) | 5 ft 10 3/8 in (1.79 m) | 4.42 s | 1.56 s | 2.52 s | 3.94 s | 7.19 s | 37.0 in (0.94 m) | 10 ft 1 in (3.07 m) | 13 reps |
All values from Ole Miss Pro Day

After going unselected in the 2022 NFL draft, Pearson was invited to mini-camp with the New York Giants and New York Jets but was not signed.

=== Seattle Sea Dragons ===
Pearson was selected by the Seattle Sea Dragons of the XFL in the fourth round of the 2023 XFL draft. During the Dragons' Week 1 game, Pearson was five yards shy of having his first 100-yard receiving game and caught 12 passes on 14 targets. In his second game, Pearson caught his first career receiving touchdown. In Week 9, Pearson had his first career 100-yard game when he caught seven receptions on eight targets for 115 yards and one touchdown. Pearson finished the season playing in all ten games, starting nine, while leading the league in receptions (60), targets (84), receiving yards (670), and receptions for first downs (32). Pearson was also selected to the All-XFL Team after the season.

After the 2023 XFL season, Pearson tried out for the Denver Broncos, Seattle Seahawks, San Francisco 49ers, Atlanta Falcons, and Indianapolis Colts, but was not signed. The Sea Dragons folded when the XFL and United States Football League (USFL) merged to create the United Football League (UFL), terminating his contract with the team.

=== St. Louis Battlehawks ===
Pearson was selected by the St. Louis Battlehawks with the second overall pick in Phase 2 of the 2024 UFL dispersal draft. He was placed on injured reserve on March 6. He was activated on April 15, 2024. Pearson re-signed with the team on August 26.

=== DC Defenders ===
On November 11, 2026, Pearson signed with the DC Defenders.

== Professional career statistics ==
Legend
| | Led the league |
| **Bold** | Career high |

=== Regular season ===
| League | Year | Team | Games | | Receiving | | | | | Rushing | | | | | Kick returns | | | | | Punt returns | | | | | Fumbles | |
| League | Year | Team | GP | GS | Rec | Yds | Avg | Lng | TD | Att | Yds | Avg | Lng | TD | Ret | Yds | Avg | Lng | TD | Ret | Yds | Avg | Lng | TD | Fum | Lost |
|---|---|---|---|---|---|---|---|---|---|---|---|---|---|---|---|---|---|---|---|---|---|---|---|---|---|---|
| XFL | 2023 | SEA | 10 | 9 | 60 | 670 | 11.1 | 68T | 4 | — | — | — | — | — | — | — | — | — | — | 3 | 20 | 6.6 | 14 | 0 | 1 | 1 |
| XFL career | | | 10 | 9 | 60 | 670 | 11.1 | 68 | 4 | 0 | 0 | 0.0 | 0 | 0 | 0 | 0 | 0.0 | 0 | 0 | 3 | 20 | 6.6 | 14 | 0 | 1 | 1 |
| UFL | 2024 | STL | 6 | 4 | 26 | 217 | 8.4 | 28 | **1** | 2 | 10 | 5.0 | **8** | 0 | **1** | **30** | **30.0** | **30** | 0 | 7 | 64 | 9.1 | 16 | 0 | **2** | **1** |
| UFL | 2025 | STL | **10** | **7** | 30 | 219 | 7.3 | 33 | **1** | **3** | **21** | **7.0** | **8** | 0 | — | — | — | — | — | **25** | **295** | **11.8** | **26** | 0 | 0 | 0 |
| UFL | 2026 | STL | **10** | 5 | **32** | **295** | **9.2** | **34** | 0 | 1 | 1 | 1.0 | 1 | 0 | — | — | — | — | — | — | — | — | — | — | 0 | 0 |
| UFL career | | | 26 | 16 | 88 | 731 | 8.3 | 34 | 2 | 6 | 32 | 5.3 | 8 | 0 | 1 | 30 | 30.0 | 30 | 0 | 32 | 359 | 11.2 | 26 | 0 | 2 | 1 |

=== Postseason ===
| League | Year | Team | Games | | Receiving | | | | |
| League | Year | Team | GP | GS | Rec | Yds | Avg | Lng | TD |
|---|---|---|---|---|---|---|---|---|---|
| XFL | 2023 | SEA | 1 | 1 | 6 | 56 | 9.3 | 26 | 1 |
| XFL career | | | 1 | 1 | 6 | 56 | 9.3 | 26 | 1 |
| UFL | 2024 | STL | 1 | 0 | 2 | 12 | 6.0 | 15 | 0 |
| UFL | 2025 | STL | 1 | 0 | 2 | 50 | 25.0 | 41 | 0 |
| UFL | 2026 | STL | | | | | | | |
| UFL career | | | 2 | 0 | 4 | 62 | 15.5 | 41 | 0 |

=== XFL records ===
- Most receptions in a career: 60
- Most receiving yards in a career: 670
- Most receptions in a single season: 60 (2023)
- Most receiving yards in a single season: 670 (2023)

==== Seattle franchise records ====
- Most receptions in a career: 60
- Most receiving yards in a career: 670
- Most receptions in a single season: 60 (2023)
- Most receiving yards in a single season: 670 (2023)

== Personal life ==
Pearson is the son of Jamal Pearson and Candice McKenzie.

In 2017, Pearson was charged with criminal trespass while enrolled at Western Kentucky University.
