= Martinsburg High School =

Coordinates: 39°26′53.9″N 77°58′6.5″W

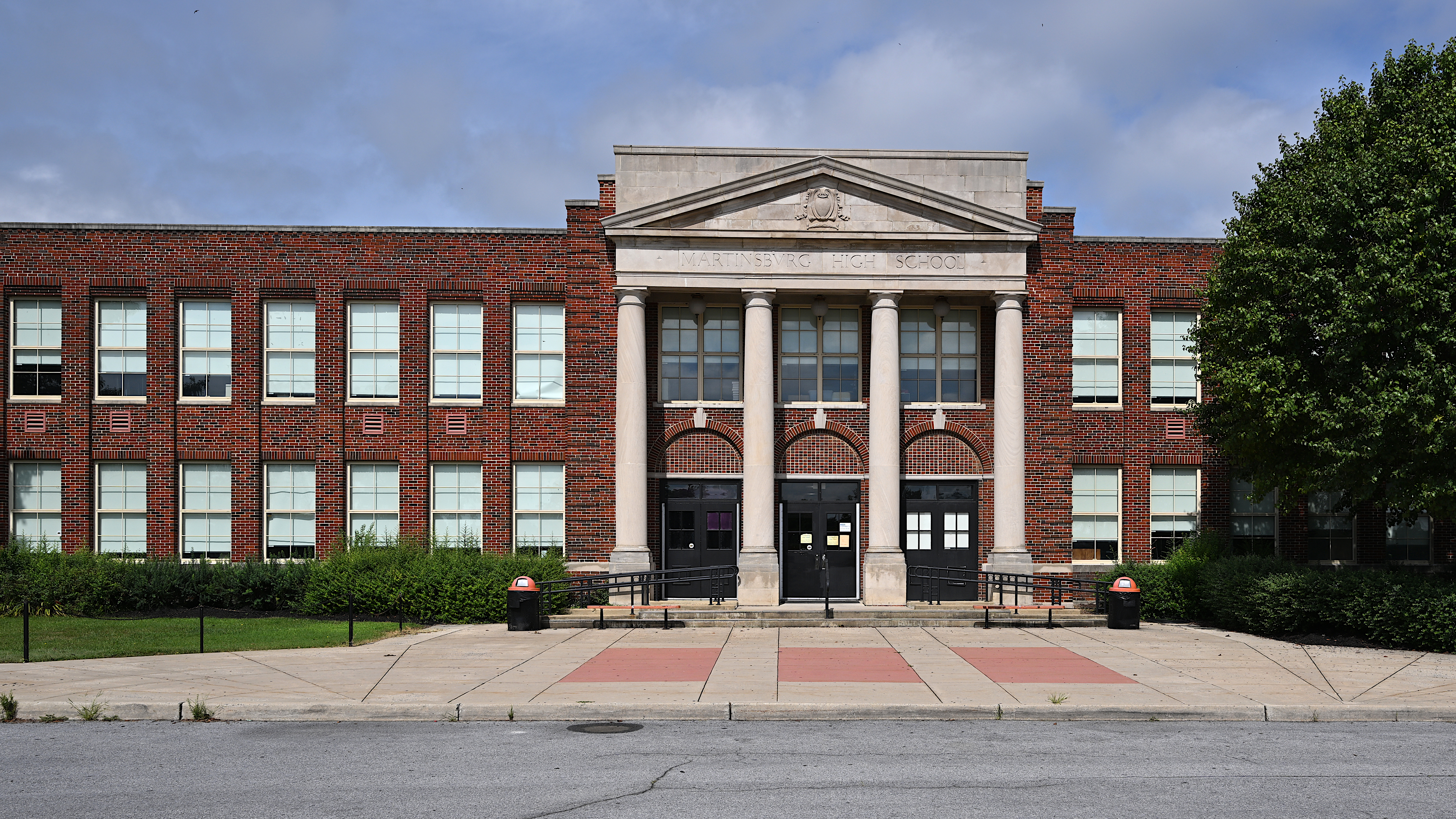

Location
- 701 South Queen Street; Martinsburg, West Virginia; United States

Information
- Type: High school, public
- Motto: Enter to Learn - Go Forth to Serve
- Established: 1883, relocated in 1913
- Principal: Maranda Lynch
- Teaching staff: 98.75 (FTE)
- Grades: 9–12
- Enrollment: 1,466 (2023–2024)
- Student to teacher ratio: 14.85
- Colors: Orange and black
- Mascot: Bulldog
- Newspaper: The Orange and Black
- Yearbook: The Triangle
- Website: School website

Martinsburg High School is a high school located in the upper Shenandoah Valley in Martinsburg, West Virginia. The school is a member of the West Virginia Secondary School Activities Commission. The principal of the school is Maranda Lynch.

== History and academics ==
During the late 1960s, Martinsburg struggled due to budgetary constraints. The school had a different principal each year in 1968, 1969, and 1970, and did not have any cafeteria facilities on the premises. MHS graduated three National Merit Scholars in 1971.

In 2011, Martinsburg High School became the 623rd official chapter of the Science National Honor Society. Martinsburg High School was the sixth high school in West Virginia to be recognized by the Science National Honor Society.

== Notable alumni ==
- Jennifer Armentrout, New York Times bestselling author of young adult and fantasy novels
- Tyson Bagent, NFL quarterback for the Chicago Bears
- Ray Barker, former first baseman for the New York Yankees
- Scott Bullett, former outfielder for the Chicago Cubs
- Vicky Bullett, a two-time Olympic gold medalist and former WNBA player
- Hudson Clement, college football wide receiver for the Illinois Fighting Illini
- Doug Creek, former MLB pitcher (1995–97; 1999–03; 2005)
- Donte Grantham, a basketball player who played for Clemson University and currently plays for Bursaspor Yörsan in the Turkish Basketball Super League.
- Juwan Green, NFL wide receiver
- Kevin Pittsnogle, a basketball player who played for West Virginia University
- Fulton Walker, a former NFL defensive back and kick returner
