= Seattle Sea Dragons =

American football team

Logo

General information
- Founded: 2018
- Folded: 2024
- Headquartered: Seattle, Washington, U.S.
- Colors: Orange, navy, green
- Website: xfl.com/teams/seattle

Personnel
- Owners: Alpha Acquico, LLC; (RedBird Capital Partners; Dwayne Johnson; Dany Garcia)
- Head coach: Jim Zorn (2020); Jim Haslett (2023)

Team history
- Seattle Dragons (2020–2022); Seattle Sea Dragons (2023)

Home fields
- Lumen Field (2020, 2023)

League / conference affiliations
- XFL (2020–2023): West Division (2020); North Division (2023)

Playoff appearances (1)
- XFL: 2023

The Seattle Sea Dragons were a professional American football team based in Seattle, Washington. The Sea Dragons competed in the second incarnation of the XFL. The team was founded by Vince McMahon’s Alpha Entertainment as the Seattle Dragons, and were owned and operated by Dwayne Johnson’s Alpha Acquico. The Sea Dragons played their home games at Lumen Field.

== History ==
=== McMahon era (2020) ===
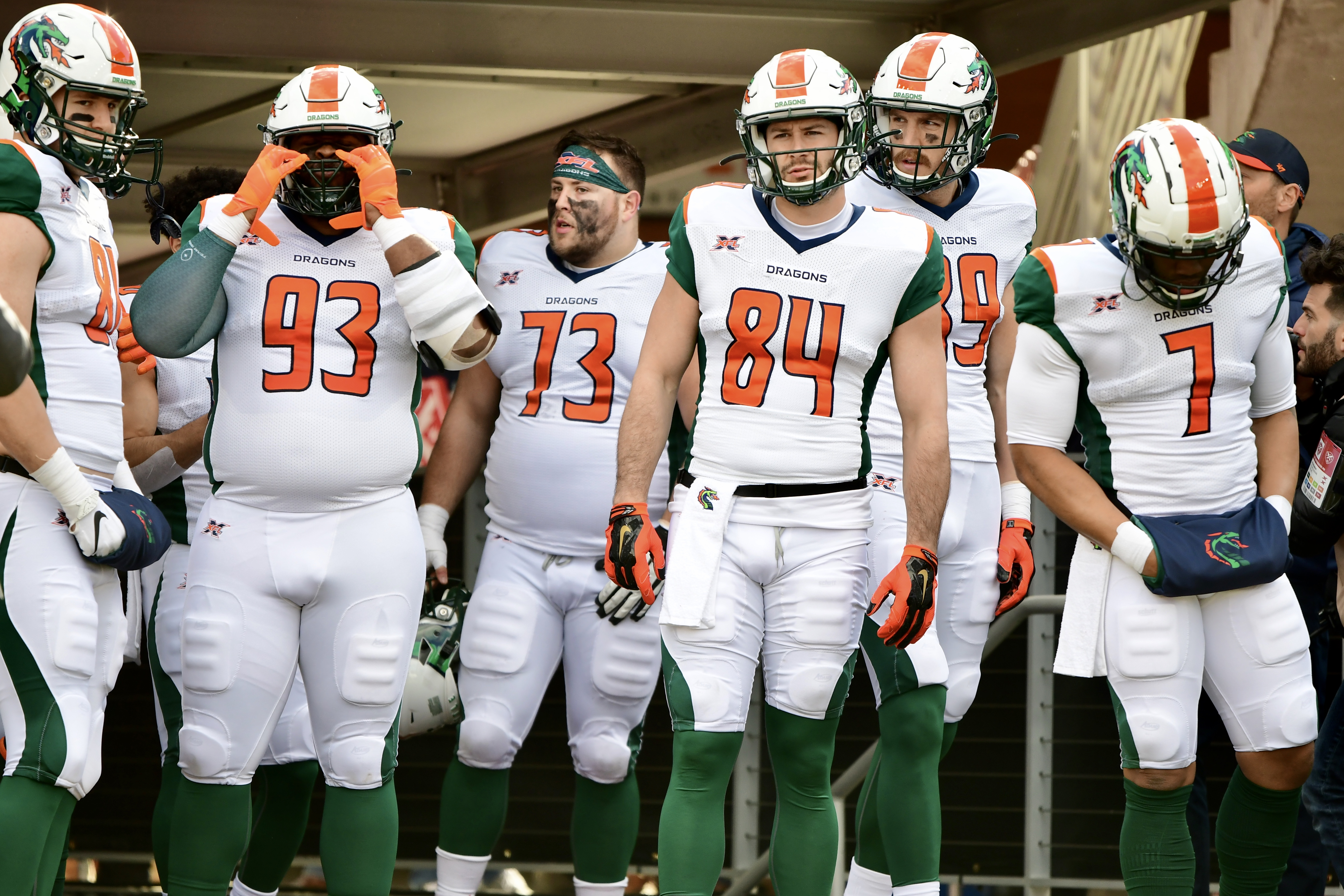
Seattle Dragons in uniform in 2020.

On December 5, 2018, Seattle was announced as one of eight cities that would join the newly reformed XFL, as well as St. Louis, Houston, Los Angeles, New York, DC, Tampa Bay, and Dallas. Former Seahawks quarterback Jim Zorn, who was the first quarterback to start for the Seahawks, was named the team's first head coach on February 25, 2019. The team name and logo were revealed on August 21, 2019, as well as the team's uniforms on December 3, 2019.

On October 15, 2019, The Dragons announced their first player in team history, being assigned former Memphis Express Quarterback Brandon Silvers.

The Dragons won their first game in team history on February 16, 2020, defeating the Tampa Bay Vipers 17-9. On March 12, 2020, The XFL announced that the remainder of the 2020 XFL season had been cancelled due to the COVID-19 pandemic. The team finished with a 1–4 record. On April 10, 2020, the XFL suspended operations, with all of the league's employees, players and staff being terminated.

Former logo of the Seattle Dragons in the 2020 XFL season.

=== Dwayne Johnson and Dany Garcia era (2023) ===
On August 3, 2020, it was reported that a consortium led by Dwayne "The Rock" Johnson, Dany Garcia, and Gerry Cardinale (through Cardinale's fund RedBird Capital Partners) purchased the XFL for $15 million just hours before an auction could take place; the purchase received court approval on August 7, 2020. The XFL hired Jim Haslett as a Head Coach on April 13, 2022, with the expectation that he would be coaching the Seattle team. On July 24, 2022, the return of the Seattle XFL franchise was confirmed, as well as the hiring of Jim Haslett. Haslett brought on June Jones, who had been head coach of the undefeated Houston Roughnecks the previous XFL season, in as the offensive coordinator to run the Run and Shoot offense. On October 31, 2022, the XFL officially announced that the Dragons would be changing their name to "Sea Dragons", as well as unveiling a brand new logo.

The newly rechristened Sea Dragons' 2023 season saw the team earn their first playoff berth and clinch second place in the North Division with a 7–3 record. The Sea Dragons would be eliminated by the DC Defenders in the North Division title game in the playoffs.

In September 2023, Axios reported that the XFL was in advanced talks with the USFL to merge the two leagues prior to the start of their 2024 seasons. On September 28, 2023, the XFL and USFL announced their intent to merge with details surrounding the merger to be announced at a later date. The merger would also require regulatory approval. In October 2023 the XFL filed a trademark application for the name "United Football League". On November 30, 2023, Garcia announced via her Instagram page that the leagues had received regulatory approval for the merger and were finalizing plans for a "combined season" to begin March 30, 2024. The merger was made official on December 31, 2023, and on January 1, 2024, it was announced the Sea Dragons would not be a part of the merger. Geographic concerns were a substantial factor in the Dragons being excluded, as the newly merged league had a reduced geographic footprint (concentrated mostly in the midwestern and southern United States) compared to the XFL in an effort to limit travel expenses. The league retains an interest in the market, reportedly has identified the Sea Dragons as a frontrunner for revival for the league's planned 2026 expansion and has maintained a retainer agreement with Lumen Field for the potential return of the franchise; league vice president Daryl Johnston stated in March 2025 that the geographic restrictions that led to Seattle being suspended in the merger would not be an issue once the league began rewarding expansion teams. The UFL considered hosting the 2025 championship game in Seattle under the retainer agreement, a reward typically only given to cities with active teams, but found the stadium was unavailable due to conflicts with the 2025 FIFA Club World Cup. No such expansion ever happened, and the arrival of Mike Repole as incoming business director and his insistence on smaller soccer-specific stadiums for all of the UFL's teams would rule out the Sea Dragons' return for the foreseeable future, commenting that NFL-sized stadiums like Lumen Field are oversized for his vision for the league and that he is targeting non-NFL markets.

== Coach history ==
=== Head coach history ===
#	Name	Term	Regular season				Playoffs			Awards
#	Name	Term	GC	W	L	Win %	GC	W	L	Awards
Seattle Dragons
1	Jim Zorn	2020	5	1	4	.200	–	–	–	
Seattle Sea Dragons
2	Jim Haslett	2023	10	7	3	.700	1	0	1	

=== Offensive coordinator history ===
#	Name	Term	Regular season				Playoffs			Awards
#	Name	Term	GC	W	L	Win %	GC	W	L	Awards
Seattle Dragons
1	Mike Riley	2020	5	1	4	.200	–	–	–	
Seattle Sea Dragons
2	June Jones	2023	10	7	3	.700	1	0	1	

=== Defensive coordinator history ===
#	Name	Term	Regular season				Playoffs			Awards
#	Name	Term	GC	W	L	Win %	GC	W	L	Awards
Seattle Dragons
1	Clayton Lopez	2020	5	1	4	.200	–	–	–	
Seattle Sea Dragons
2	Ron Zook	2023	10	7	3	.700	1	0	1	

== Player history ==
=== Notable players ===
XFL season	Pos	Name	Notes
2020	LB	Steven Johnson	Former Denver Broncos Linebacker
2023	WR	Josh Gordon	Former Cleveland Browns Wide Receiver, 2012 2nd Round Pick, 2013 Pro Bowler
2023	RB	Phillip Lindsay	Former Denver Broncos Pro Bowl Running Back
2023	LB	Jordan Evans	Former Cincinnati Bengals Linebacker

== Rivalries ==
=== Overall regular season record vs. opponents ===
Team	Record	Win %
Vegas Vipers	3–0	1.000
Orlando Guardians	1–0	1.000
San Antonio Brahmas	1–0	1.000
Houston Roughnecks	1–1	.500
Arlington Renegades	1–1	.500
St. Louis Battlehawks	1–2	.333
DC Defenders	0–3	.000

=== Season-by-season record ===
XFL champions^{§}	Division champions^{^}	Wild Card berth^{#}

Season	Team	League	Conference	Division	Regular season			Postseason results	Awards	Head coaches	Pct.
Season	Team	League	Conference	Division	Finish	W	L	Postseason results	Awards	Head coaches	Pct.
2020	2020	XFL		West	4th	1	4	Season suspended after 5 games due to COVID-19		Jim Zorn	.200
2021	No Season										
2022	No Season										
2023	2023	XFL		North	2nd ^{#}	7	3	Lost Division Finals (Defenders) 21–37		Jim Haslett	.700
Total						8	7	All-time regular season record (2020–2023)			.533
Total						0	1	All-time postseason record (2020–2023)			.000
Total						8	8	All-time regular season and postseason record (2020–2023)			.500

== Records ==
All-time Sea Dragons leaders
Leader	Player	Record	Years with Sea Dragons
Passing yards	Ben DiNucci	2,671 passing yards	2023
Passing touchdowns	Ben DiNucci	20 passing touchdowns	2023
Rushing yards	Ben DiNucci	305 rushing yards	2023
Rushing touchdowns	Ben DiNucci	3 rushing touchdowns	2023
Receiving yards	Jahcour Pearson	670 receiving yards	2023
Receiving touchdowns	Juwan Green	6 receiving touchdowns	2023
Receptions	Jahcour Pearson	60 receptions	2023
Tackles	Steven Johnson Qwynnterrio Cole	48 tackles	2020 2023
Sacks	Tuzar Skipper	6.0 sacks	2023
Interceptions	Qwynnterrio Cole	3 interceptions	2023
