= Ben DiNucci =

American football player (born 1996)

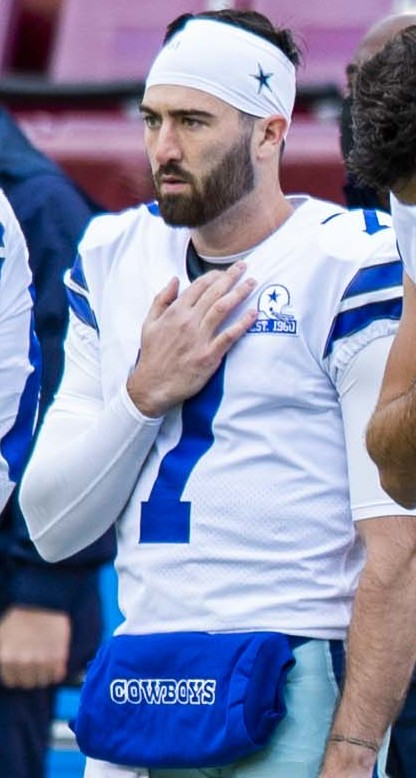
- DiNucci with the Dallas Cowboys in 2020

No. 7, 11
- Position: Quarterback

Personal information
- Born: November 24, 1996 (age 29); Atlanta, Georgia, U.S.
- Listed height: 6 ft 2 in (1.88 m)
- Listed weight: 215 lb (98 kg)

Career information
- High school: Pine-Richland (Gibsonia, Pennsylvania)
- College: Pittsburgh (2015–2017); James Madison (2018–2019)
- NFL draft: 2020: 7th round, 231st overall pick

Career history
- Dallas Cowboys (2020–2021); Seattle Sea Dragons (2023); Denver Broncos (2023); Buffalo Bills (2024)*; New Orleans Saints (2024)*; Atlanta Falcons (2025)*; Denver Broncos (2025)*
- * Offseason or practice squad member only

Awards and highlights
- XFL passing yards leader (2023); CAA Offensive Player of the Year (2019); First-team All-CAA (2019); Third-team All-CAA (2018)

Career NFL statistics
- Passing attempts: 43
- Passing completions: 23
- Completion percentage: 53.5%
- TD–INT: 0–0
- Passing yards: 219
- Passer rating: 67.9
- Stats at Pro Football Reference

Benjamin Anthony DiNucci (born November 24, 1996) is an American professional football quarterback. He played college football for the Pittsburgh Panthers and James Madison Dukes and was selected by the Dallas Cowboys of the NFL in the seventh round of the 2020 NFL draft. He has also played for the Seattle Sea Dragons in the XFL in 2023, leading them to the playoffs.

He is currently a college football commentator for CBS Sports.

== Early life ==
DiNucci attended Pine-Richland High School in Gibsonia, Pennsylvania, where he played high school football. As a sophomore, he became a starter at quarterback.

As a senior, he threw for a WPIAL-record 4,269 yards becoming the first player in Pennsylvania history to throw for over 4,000 yards in a season with 46 touchdowns and 9 interceptions. He led his team to a 15–1 record, and a state AAAA championship game appearance. He received 2014–2015 Gatorade Player of the Year for the state of Pennsylvania, second-team USA TODAY All-American, Pennsylvania Sports Writers Class AAAA Player of the Year, Pennsylvania Football News Class AAAA Offensive Player of the Year honors.

DiNucci finished his high school career with 548 of 809 completions for 7,619 yards, and 72 touchdowns.

== College career ==
Although he originally intended to enroll at the University of Pennsylvania, DiNucci decommitted and accepted a football scholarship from the University of Pittsburgh, after Pat Narduzzi was hired as the new head coach.

As a redshirt freshman, he was a backup quarterback behind Nathan Peterman. His first game experience came in the final offensive series against Duke University. In the 2016 Pinstripe Bowl, he relieved an injured Peterman late in the third quarter, posting three of nine completions for 16 yards, one touchdown, two interceptions and two carries for 18 yards in a 31–24 loss against Northwestern University.

As a sophomore, he was named the starting quarterback before the seventh game against North Carolina State University, after senior Max Browne suffered a season-ending right shoulder injury. He was platooned during the year and eventually lost the starting position to true freshman Kenny Pickett, for the season finale 24–14 victory against the previously undefeated No. 2 University of Miami. He finished with 88 of 158 completions for 1,091 yards, five touchdowns and five interceptions. In December, he announced his decision to transfer to James Madison University.

As a junior at James Madison, he started all 13 games at quarterback, posting 211 of 309 completions for 2,275 yards, 16 passing touchdowns, 12 interceptions, 433 rushing yards and nine rushing touchdowns (leading the team). He received third-team All-CAA honors. He had a career-high 316 passing yards against Elon University. He passed for a career-best four touchdowns against the University of Rhode Island. He rushed for career highs of 104 rushing yards and three rushing touchdowns at Towson University.

As a senior, he started all 16 games at quarterback, passing for 3,441 yards, 29 passing touchdowns, completed nearly 71% of his throws, had 122 carries for 569 yards and seven rushing touchdowns. He earned All-CAA, CAA Offensive Player of the Year and AFCA first-team All-American honors. He led the Dukes to the FCS Championship Game, where the team lost to North Dakota State University. In the title game, DiNucci completed 22 of 33 passes for 204 yards, two touchdowns and one interception.

He finished his career at James Madison ranked third in completions (479), fourth in passing touchdowns (45) and passing yards (5,716) and seventh in total offense (6,718).

== Professional career ==
Pre-draft measurables
Height	Weight
6 ft 1 3/4 in (1.87 m)	210 lb (95 kg)
Values from Pro Day

=== Dallas Cowboys ===
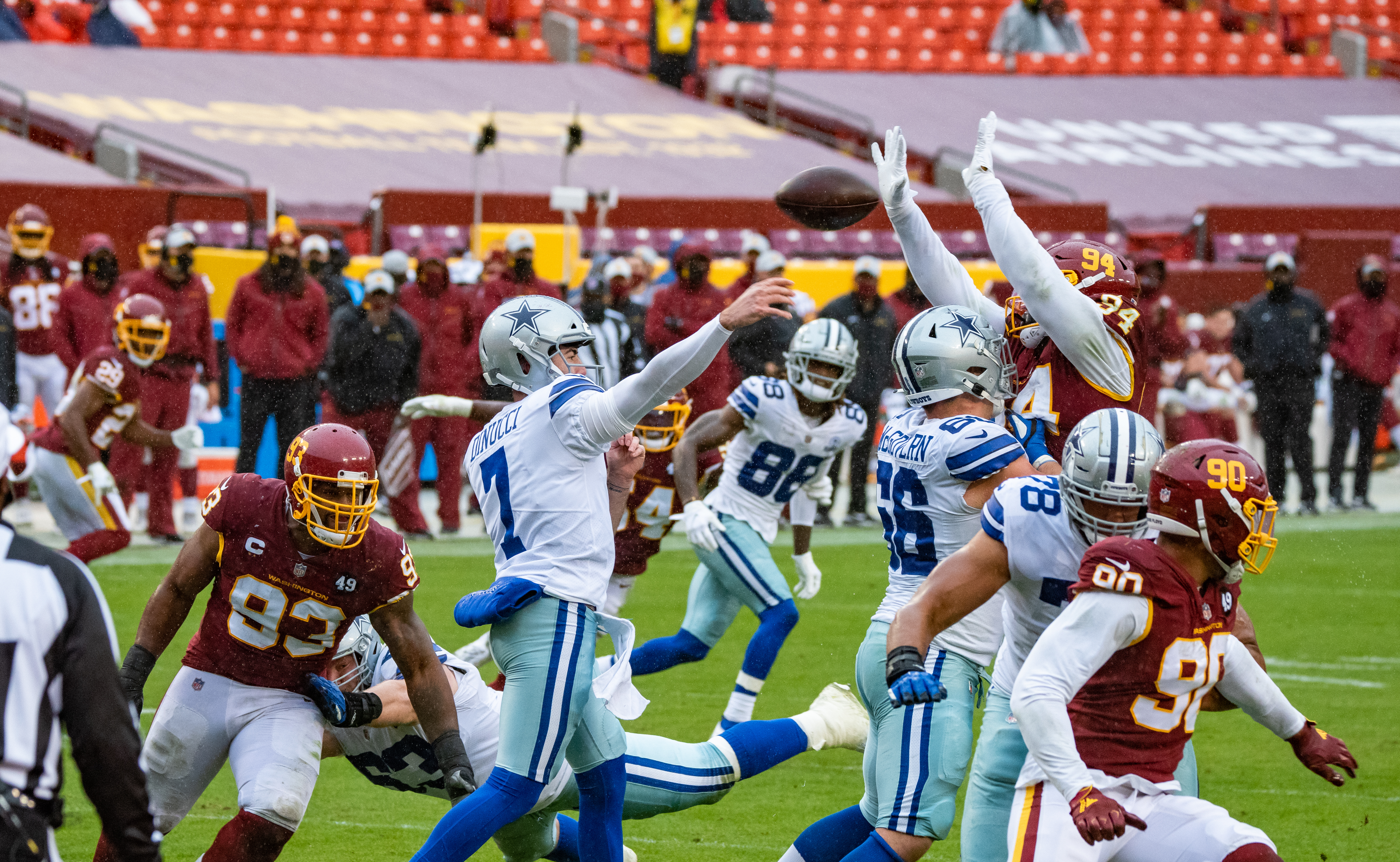
DiNucci throwing in 2020

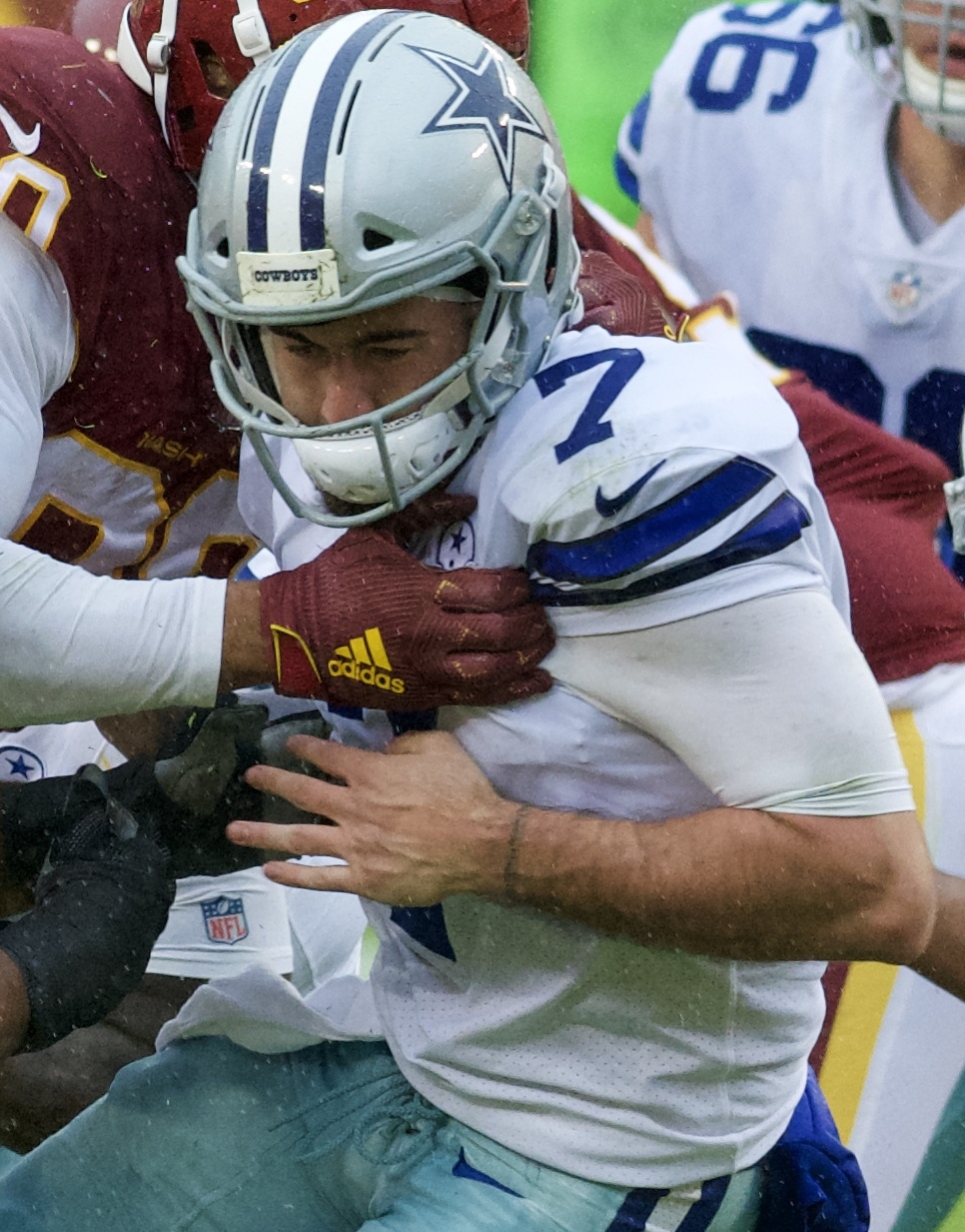
DiNucci in 2020

DiNucci was selected by the Dallas Cowboys in the seventh round (231st overall) of the 2020 NFL draft, after it became apparent that he was considering signing with either the Cleveland Browns or the Chicago Bears if he were to become an undrafted free agent. On October 19, 2020, DiNucci made his NFL debut in relief of Andy Dalton against the Arizona Cardinals. On October 25, 2020, against the Washington Football Team, DiNucci came into the game after Dalton left the game with a concussion in the third quarter. DiNucci threw his first completed pass, for 32 yards, to Amari Cooper. He completed 2 out of 3 attempts for 39 yards during the 3–25 loss, while taking three sacks in 12 snaps.

On October 31, 2020, the Cowboys announced that DiNucci would make his first career start against the Philadelphia Eagles due to Dalton being in concussion protocol. DiNucci completed 21-of-40 passes for 180 yards, lost two fumbles and was sacked 4 times, as the Cowboys lost 23–9 and failed to score a touchdown in back-to-back games for just the fourth time in franchise history, even though the Cowboys' defense had caused four Eagles' turnovers during the contest. DiNucci was passed on the depth chart by Garrett Gilbert for the backup job for the rest of the season.

On August 31, 2021, DiNucci was waived by the Cowboys, but added to the practice squad the next day.

DiNucci signed a reserve/future contract with the Cowboys on January 18, 2022. On August 30, 2022, DiNucci was waived by the Cowboys.

=== Seattle Sea Dragons ===
DiNucci was allocated in the opening phase of the 2023 XFL draft. Outside of A. J. McCarron, DiNucci was the only quarterback in the draft pool to have had NFL regular season experience. On November 15, 2022, DiNucci was selected by the XFL's Seattle Sea Dragons. He started 10 games and guided the team to a playoff berth with a 7–3 record. He led the league in passing yards (2,671), attempts (374), completions (272), and interceptions (13), while ranking second in passing touchdowns (20). He was released from his contract on May 15, 2023.

=== Denver Broncos (first stint) ===
On May 16, 2023, DiNucci signed with the Denver Broncos, after participating on a tryout basis at the team's rookie minicamp. He was waived on August 29, 2023 and re-signed to the practice squad. He signed a reserve/future contract on January 8, 2024. On May 8, 2024, DiNucci was waived by the Broncos.

=== Buffalo Bills ===
On August 12, 2024, DiNucci signed with the Buffalo Bills after Shane Buechele suffered a neck injury. On August 27, the Bills released DiNucci.

=== New Orleans Saints ===
On December 10, 2024, DiNucci was signed to the New Orleans Saints' practice squad following an injury to quarterback Derek Carr. He signed a reserve/future contract with New Orleans on January 6, 2025. On April 29, DiNucci was released by the Saints.

=== Atlanta Falcons ===
On August 15, 2025, DiNucci signed with the Atlanta Falcons. However, he was released during preliminary roster cuts on August 23.

=== Denver Broncos (second stint) ===
On January 18, 2026, Dinucci was signed to the Denver Broncos' practice squad following a season-ending ankle injury to Broncos quarterback Bo Nix.

== Career statistics ==
=== NFL ===
Year	Team	Games			Passing									Rushing					Sacks		Fumbles	
Year	Team	GP	GS	Record	Cmp	Att	Pct	Yds	Avg	Lng	TD	Int	Rtg	Att	Yds	Avg	Lng	TD	Sck	SckY	Fum	Lost
2020	DAL	3	1	0–1	23	43	53.4	219	5.0	32	0	0	67.8	6	22	3.6	0	0	7	73	4	2
Career		3	1	0–1	23	43	53.4	219	5.0	32	0	0	67.8	6	22	3.6	0	0	7	73	4	2

=== XFL ===
Regular season

Year	Team	Games			Passing								Rushing			
Year	Team	GP	GS	Record	Cmp	Att	Pct	Yds	Avg	TD	Int	Rtg	Att	Yds	Avg	TD
2023	SEA	10	10	7–3	242	374	64.7	2,671	7.1	20	13	89.1	53	305	5.7	3
Career		10	10	7–3	242	374	64.7	2,671	7.1	20	13	89.1	53	305	5.7	3

Postseason

Year	Team	Games			Passing								Rushing			
Year	Team	GP	GS	Record	Cmp	Att	Pct	Yds	Avg	TD	Int	Rtg	Att	Yds	Avg	TD
2023	SEA	1	1	0–1	31	48	64.5	295	6.1	3	0	102.3	3	16	5.3	0
Career		1	1	0-1	31	48	64.5	295	6.1	3	0	102.3	3	16	5.3	0

=== College ===
Season	Team	Games		Passing								Rushing			
Season	Team	GP	GS	Cmp	Att	Pct	Yds	Avg	TD	Int	Rtg	Att	Yds	Avg	TD
2015	Pittsburgh	0	0	Redshirted											
2016	Pittsburgh	2	0	3	9	33.3	16	1.8	1	2	40.5	2	18	9.0	0
2017	Pittsburgh	10	6	88	158	55.7	1,091	6.9	5	5	117.8	55	126	2.3	1
2018	James Madison	13	13	211	309	68.3	2,275	7.4	16	12	139.4	107	433	4.0	9
2019	James Madison	16	16	268	378	70.9	3,441	9.1	29	6	169.5	122	569	4.7	7
Career		40	35	570	854	66.7	6,823	7.9	51	25	1477.7	286	1,146	4.0	17

== Broadcasting career ==
Following his departure from the Falcons, DiNucci became a college football color commentator for CBS Sports. He made his debut at the Bucknell–Air Force game on August 30, 2025. In December, he partnered with the NFL on CBS for a video in which he disguised himself for a flag football game.
