= Juwan Green =

American football player (born 1998)

Profile
- Position: Wide receiver

Personal information
- Born: July 1, 1998 (age 28); Martinsburg, West Virginia, U.S.
- Listed height: 6 ft 0 in (1.83 m)
- Listed weight: 187 lb (85 kg)

Career information
- High school: Martinsburg
- College: Albany
- NFL draft: 2020: undrafted

Career history
- Atlanta Falcons (2020–2021)*; Detroit Lions (2021)*; Tennessee Titans (2022)*; Seattle Sea Dragons (2023); Kansas City Chiefs (2023)*; San Antonio Brahmas (2025)*
- * Offseason or practice squad member only
- Stats at Pro Football Reference

Juwan Green (born July 1, 1998) is an American professional football wide receiver. He played college football at Albany, and was signed as an undrafted free agent by the Atlanta Falcons. As a senior at the University at Albany, he broke team records for receptions, receiving yards, and touchdown receptions, as well as helped guide the team to their first playoff win.

He is the son of Dean Green, a former wide receiver at the University of Maryland.

== Early life ==
Green was born in Martinsburg, West Virginia and attended Martinsburg High School. Originally a basketball player, he made the switch to football during his senior year, where he played as both a wide receiver and cornerback. In addition to basketball, Green also participated in track and field. Green said he made the switch to football because he would be more likely to play the sport professionally.

== College career ==
Green played college football at Lackawanna College during his freshman and sophomore years before transferring to the University at Albany, where he graduated. During his time at Lackawanna, Green scored 11 touchdowns and also served as the team's kick returner. In his sophomore year, he caught 38 passes for 743 yards. He was also named team MVP. During his junior season, Green made 23 receptions for 429 yards and recorded four touchdowns. During his senior year at the University at Albany, he recorded 1,386 receiving yards and 17 touchdowns, both Colonial Athletic Association records.

== Professional career ==
=== Pre-draft ===
Green was not invited to the NFL Scouting Combine, but he did play in the NFLPA Collegiate Bowl. Although he was a starting wide receiver, he did not have any receptions during the game. Preceding the 2020 NFL draft, Green was projected to be a late-round pick or priority free agent. He had been in contact with 15 NFL teams, but did not sign with any.

=== Atlanta Falcons ===
Green was signed by the Atlanta Falcons as an undrafted free agent following the 2020 draft. He was waived before the season and signed to the practice squad, where he spent his entire rookie season. His practice squad contract with the team expired after the season on January 11, 2021. He re-signed with the Falcons with a one-year contract on May 6, 2021.

On August 31, 2021, Green was waived by the Falcons and re-signed to the practice squad the next day. He was released on September 15. He was re-signed to the team's practice squad on September 20. He was released on November 5.

=== Detroit Lions ===
On December 28, 2021, Green was signed to the Detroit Lions practice squad. He was released on January 8, 2022.

=== Tennessee Titans ===
On June 1, 2022, Green signed with the Tennessee Titans. Green was released by the Titans on July 28, 2022.

=== Seattle Sea Dragons ===
On November 17, 2022, Green was drafted by the Seattle Sea Dragons of the XFL. He was released from his contract on August 21, 2023.

=== Kansas City Chiefs ===
On August 21, 2023, Green signed with the Kansas City Chiefs. He was waived on August 29, 2023.

=== San Antonio Brahmas ===
On February 8, 2025, Green signed with the San Antonio Brahmas of the United Football League (UFL). He was released on March 10, 2025.

== Personal life ==
Green had a major in communications. He is the son of Dean Green and Toni Stevenson. He has one sister, Ahry.
