= John Schriffen =

American sports reporter

- Schriffen in 2026
- Born: October 8, 1984 (age 42)
- Education: Dartmouth College
- Sports commentary career
- Team: Chicago White Sox (2024–present)
- Genre: Play-by-play
- Sport: Baseball
- Employer: ESPN; Chicago Sports Network

John Schriffen (born October 8, 1984) is an American sportscaster. He has been the play-by-play voice of the Chicago White Sox on Chicago Sports Network since 2024.

== Biography ==
Schriffen is a graduate of Dartmouth College, where he called baseball, basketball and hockey games for the school's radio station.

He began his professional career as a sports anchor and reporter for News 12 in New York City before moving to WRC-TV in Washington, D.C. From 2012 to 2014, Schriffen worked as a New York–based correspondent for ABC News, contributing reports for Good Morning America and Nightline.

After leaving ABC, Schriffen served as a studio host for the NFL Network and worked as a play-by-play broadcaster and sideline reporter for CBS Sports from 2015 to 2020.

He began calling KBO League games on ESPN in 2020.

Schriffen attracted criticism and controversy early in his first season with the Chicago White Sox. In April 2024, he ranted about "all the haters" during his call of a walk-off home run, after which he stopped talking to the media. WSCR (AM) personalities were especially critical of moments which suggested a lack of knowledge about the White Sox and baseball in general, including mispronouncing Bill Veeck's name and misusing the term sacrifice fly. Schriffen escalated the situation into a feud in May 2024 by remarking during a broadcast about "radio losers."

In 2026, Schriffen made his debut as a desk analyst for the Ultimate Fighting Championship at UFC Fight Night: Moicano vs. Duncan on April 4.
