= Matt Barrie (sportscaster) =

American sportscaster

Matt Barrie is a sportscaster for ESPN's SportsCenter. He joined the show in March 2013.

Prior to joining ESPN, Barrie covered high school sports for Dallas/Fort Worth's NBC-owned station KXAS-TV, then CBS affiliate WLTX and sports talk station WCOS in Columbia, South Carolina.

Earlier in his career, he was a general reporter for NBC affiliate WJFW-TV in Rhinelander, Wisconsin (also serving Wausau), where a 2002 remote interview with then-Governor of Wisconsin Scott McCallum from Madison regarding cuts in state shared services in the market's Northwoods region ended with McCallum agitated about Barrie's questions, and calling him a 'dumb son of a bitch' with his microphone still hot and the satellite connection still active, thinking his connection to WJFW and Barrie had already been severed. McCallum would later apologize for the outburst.

In addition to his SportsCenter duties, Barrie is the pregame and halftime show host for ESPN College Football Thursday Primetime with analysts Joey Galloway and Jesse Palmer, and he hosts ESPN College Football Final, a Saturday night wrap-up highlights show with analysts Galloway and E. J. Manuel. He is also a golf commentator for ESPN’s coverage of TGL, The Masters, and the PGA Championship.

== Education ==
Barrie is a graduate of the Walter Cronkite School of Journalism at Arizona State University.
