= Lowell Galindo =

American sportscaster

- Born: 1980 (age 44–45); Houston, Texas, U.S.
- Education: Emerson College
- Occupation: Sportscaster
- Years active: 2011–present

Lowell Galindo (born c. 1980) is an American sportscaster and play by play commentator, best known for his job as a commentator for college football on ESPN. A graduate of Emerson College, Galindo also previously covered the Texas Longhorns' Longhorn Network from 2011 to 2024, as well as having worked for other ventures, such as the XFL on ESPN, and the UFL on ESPN, as well as ESPNU.

== Early life ==
Galindo was born in Houston, although he grew up in San Antonio.
