= Tiffany Blackmon =

American sports reporter (NFL Network) (born 1984)

- Born: Tiffany Danielle Blackmon; October 10, 1984 (age 41); Attleboro, Massachusetts, U.S.
- Education: Georgia State University
- Occupation: Sports reporter

Tiffany Danielle Blackmon (born October 10, 1984) is an American sports reporter for NFL on CBS and College Football on CBS Sports. She previously was a sports reporter at NFL Network and ESPN College Football.

== Early life and education ==
Blackmon is the daughter of Jacqueline and former NFL linebacker and former NFL assistant coach Donald Blackmon. Blackmon has one sister Candice and one brother Donald Jr. Blackmon was a four-year starter for the North Gwinnett High School soccer team, where she was named defensive MVP and overall MVP. Blackmon was selected All-Gwinnett County high school team. Blackmon also was selected to the All-State team. Blackmon attended Georgia State University, where she played 49 games with the soccer team.

== Career ==
Prior to joining NFL Network, Blackmon worked as an anchor and reporter for Comcast SportsNet Houston. Blackmon was the co-host for the weekly Houston Rockets All-Access show. Blackmon also served as the host of SportsNet Reports. Blackmon also worked at the NBC affiliate KFOR-TV in Oklahoma City, where she was the reporter for the Oklahoma City Thunder of the NBA.
