= List of St. Louis Battlehawks seasons =

This article is a list of seasons of the St. Louis Battlehawks, an American football franchise of the UFL. The list documents the season-by-season records of the Battlehawks' franchise from 2020 to present, including postseason records, and league awards for individual players or head coaches. The Battlehawks franchise was founded in 2018 with the recreation of the league.

== Seasons ==
| UFL champions^{†} (2024–present) | XFL champions^{§} (2023) | Conference champions^{*} | Division champions^{^} | Wild Card berth^{#} |

| Season | Team | League | Conference | Division | Regular season | | | Postseason results | Awards | Head coaches | Pct. |
| Season | Team | League | Conference | Division | Finish | W | L | Postseason results | Awards | Head coaches | Pct. |
|---|---|---|---|---|---|---|---|---|---|---|---|
| 2020 | 2020 | XFL | —N/a | East | 2nd | 3 | 2 | Season Suspended after 5 games due to COVID-19 | | Jonathan Hayes | .600 |
| 2021 | — | | | | | | | | | | |
| 2022 | — | | | | | | | | | | |
| 2023 | 2023 | XFL | —N/a | North | 3rd | 7 | 3 | | Darrius Shepherd (STPOY) | Anthony Becht | .733 |
| 2024 | 2024 | UFL | XFL | —N/a | 1st^{#} | 7 | 3 | Lost XFL Conference Championship (Brahmas) 15–25 | Hakeem Butler (OPOY); Chris Garrett (STPOY) | Anthony Becht | .733 |
| 2025 | 2025 | UFL | XFL | —N/a | 1st^{#} | 8 | 2 | Lost XFL Conference Championship (Defenders) 18–36 | | Anthony Becht | .733 |
| 2026 | 2026 | UFL | —N/a | —N/a | 2nd^{#} | 6 | 4 | Lost Semifinals (Kings) 20–29 | | Ricky Proehl | .545 |
| Total | | | | | | 31 | 14 | All-time regular season record (2020–2026) | | | .689 |
| Total | | | | | | 0 | 3 | All-time postseason record (2020–2026) | | | .000 |
| Total | | | | | | 31 | 17 | All-time regular season and postseason record (2020–2026) | | | .646 |
