= 2023 St. Louis Battlehawks season =

American professional football season

- Owner: Alpha Acquico, LLC
- General manager: Anthony Becht
- Head coach: Anthony Becht
- Home stadium: The Dome at America's Center

Results
- Record: 7–3
- Division place: 3rd XFL North
- Playoffs: Did not qualify

The 2023 St. Louis Battlehawks season was the second season for the St. Louis Battlehawks as a professional American football franchise. They played as charter members of the XFL, one of eight teams to compete in the league for the 2023 season. The BattleHawks played their home games at The Dome at America's Center and were led by head coach Anthony Becht.

== Roster ==
2023 St. Louis Battlehawks final roster
Quarterbacks: 10 A. J. McCarron; 18 Vincent Testaverde Jr.; 5 Manny Wilkins; Running backs: 21 Mataeo Durant; 23 Brian Hill; 0 Kareem Walker; Wide receivers: 3 Marcell Ateman; 88 Hakeem Butler; 15 George Campbell; 12 Gary Jennings Jr.; 22 Steven Mitchell; 13 Austin Proehl; 11 Darrius Shepherd; Tight ends: 9 Jovani Haskins; 84 Jake Sutherland	Offensive linemen: 78 Vadal Alexander G; 73 Juwann Bushell-Beatty T; 74 Steven Gonzalez G; 75 Jaryd Jones-Smith T; 77 Eric Magwood T; 67 Christian Olmstead G; 61 Mike Panasiuk C; 55 Dallas Warmack C; Defensive linemen: 98 Freedom Akinmoladun DE; 90 Kevin Atkins NT; 37 Erik Hansen DE; 96 LaCale London DE; 99 Gelen Robinson NT; 91 Tani Tupou DE	Linebackers: 56 Travis Feeney OLB; 51 Willie Harvey Jr. ILB; 29 Silas Kelly OLB; 95 Elorm Lumor OLB; 27 Mike Rose ILB; 33 Tre Watson ILB; 53 Carson Wells OLB; 6 Lakiem Williams OLB; Defensive backs: 17 Jon Alexander SS; 39 Chris Cooper SS; 25 Lukas Denis FS; 19 Evan Fields FS; 1 Elijah Hamilton CB; 8 Mike Hampton CB; 20 Mister Harriel FS; 4 Tim Harris CB; 24 Lavert Hill CB; 26 Nate Meadors SS; 38 Brandon Sebastian CB; Special teams: 2 Donny Hageman K; 16 Sterling Hofrichter P; 47 Alex Matheson LS	Reserve lists: -- Shane Carpenter T (IR); 28 Ben DeLuca FS (IR); -- Allie Green V CB (IR); 14 Nick Tiano QB (IR); 51 active, 4 inactive

== Schedule ==
All times Central

Week	Day	Date	Kickoff	TV	Opponent	Results		Location	Attendance
Week	Day	Date	Kickoff	TV	Opponent	Score	Record	Location	Attendance
1	Sunday	February 19	2:00 p.m.	ABC	at San Antonio Brahmas	W 18–15	1–0	Alamodome	24,245
2	Thursday	February 23	8:00 p.m.	FX	at Seattle Sea Dragons	W 20–18	2–0	Lumen Field	10,386
3	Sunday	March 5	12:00 p.m.	FX	at DC Defenders	L 28–34	2–1	Audi Field	16,212
4	Sunday	March 12	3:00 p.m.	ESPN2	Arlington Renegades	W 24–11	3–1	The Dome at America's Center	38,310
5	Saturday	March 18	6:00 p.m.	FX	DC Defenders	L 20–28	3–2	The Dome at America's Center	35,868
6	Saturday	March 25	6:00 p.m.	FX	at Vegas Vipers	W 29–6	4–2	Cashman Field	6,033
7	Sunday	April 2	1:00 p.m.	ESPN	at Houston Roughnecks	W 24–15	5–2	TDECU Stadium	12,013
8	Saturday	April 8	12:00 p.m.	ESPN	Vegas Vipers	W 21–17 (OT)	6–2	The Dome at America's Center	35,167
9	Sunday	April 16	2:00 p.m.	ESPN	Seattle Sea Dragons	L 12–30	6–3	The Dome at America's Center	33,142
10	Saturday	April 22	11:00 a.m.	ESPN	Orlando Guardians	W 53–28	7–3	The Dome at America's Center	33,034

=== Game summaries ===
==== Week 1: at San Antonio Brahmas ====
Week 1: St. Louis Battlehawks at San Antonio Brahmas – Game summary

Quarter	1	2	3	4	Total
Battlehawks	0	3	0	15	18
Brahmas	3	0	3	9	15

at Alamodome, San Antonio, Texas

- Date: February 19
- Game time: 2:00 p.m. CDT
- Game weather: 72 °F (22 °C)
- Game attendance: 24,245
- Referee: Reggie Smith
- TV announcers (ABC): Matt Barrie, Joey Galloway, Eric Mac Lain and Tiffany Blackmon

Game information

First quarter

- SA – John Romo 43-yard field goal, 2:54. Brahmas 3-0. Drive: 8 plays, 32 yards, 3:26.

Second quarter

- STL – Donny Hageman 32-yard field goal, 8:03. Tied 3-3. Drive: 5 plays, 15 yards, 3:07.

Third quarter

- SA – John Romo 29-yard field goal, 9:16. Brahmas 6-3. Drive: 11 plays, 56 yards, 5:44.

Fourth quarter

- SA – Fred Brown 4-yard pass from Jack Coan (1-pt Conversion No Good), 10:42. Brahmas 12-3. Drive: 10 plays, 63 yards, 4:32.
- SA – John Romo 48-yard field goal, 3:02. Brahmas 15-3. Drive: 9 plays, 37 yards, 5:08.
- STL – Hakeem Butler 18-yard pass from A. J. McCarron (3-pt Conversion Good by Austin Proehl), 1:25. Brahmas 15-12. Drive: 8 plays, 71 yards, 1:37.
- STL – Austin Proehl 14-yard pass from A. J. McCarron (1-pt Conversion No Good), 0:16. Battlehawks 18-15. Drive: 6 plays, 75 yards, 2:46.

Top passers

- STL – A. J. McCarron – 18/27, 190 yards, 2 TD
- SA – Jack Coan – 25/36, 207 yards, TD, INT

Top rushers

- STL – Brian Hill – 6 rushes, 55 yards
- SA – Kalen Ballage – 24 rushes, 84 yards

Top receivers

- STL – Austin Proehl – 4 receptions, 49 yards, 1 TD
- SA – Jalen Tolliver – 3 receptions, 49 yards

==== Week 2: at Seattle Sea Dragons ====
Week 2: St. Louis Battlehawks at Seattle Sea Dragons – Game summary

Quarter	1	2	3	4	Total
BattleHawks	0	8	3	9	20
Sea Dragons	3	9	0	6	18

at Lumen Field, Seattle, Washington

- Date: February 23
- Game time: 8:00 p.m. CDT
- Game weather: 28 °F (−2 °C)
- Game attendance: 10,386
- Referee: Francisco Villar
- TV announcers (FX): Lowell Galindo, Sam Acho, and Taylor McGregor

Game information

First quarter

- SEA – Dominik Eberle 29-yard field goal, 4:02. Sea Dragons 3–0. Drive: 13 plays, 61 yards, 7:02.

Second quarter

- SEA – Josh Gordon 54-yard pass from Ben DiNucci (3-pt Conversion Good by Josh Gordon), 14:56. Sea Dragons 12–0. Drive: 2 plays, 73 yards, 0:34.
- STL – A. J. McCarron 1-yard rush (2-pt Conversion Good by Marcell Ateman), 7:26. Sea Dragons 12–8. Drive: 14 plays, 72 yards, 7:24.

Third quarter

- STL – Donny Hageman 44-yard field goal, 6:32. Sea Dragons 12–11. Drive: 7 plays, 16 yards, 3:58.

Fourth quarter

- STL – Hakeem Butler 44-yard pass from A. J. McCarron (2-pt Conversion No Good), 7:14. BattleHawks 17–12. Drive: 6 plays, 73 yards, 3:00.
- SEA – Jordan Veasy 8-yard pass from Ben DiNucci (3-pt Conversion No Good), 1:21. Sea Dragons 18–17. Drive: 7 plays, 60 yards, 1:50.
- STL – Donny Hageman 44-yard field goal, 0:00. BattleHawks 20–18. Drive: 8 plays, 50 yards, 1:21.

Top passers

- STL – A. J. McCarron – 22/36, 184 yards, TD
- SEA – Ben DiNucci – 19/29, 196 yards, 2 TD

Top rushers

- STL – A. J. McCarron – 5 rushes, 41 yards, TD
- SEA – Morgan Ellison – 10 rushes, 50 yards

Top receivers

- STL – Hakeem Butler – 4 receptions, 61 yards, TD
- SEA – Jahcour Pearson – 4 receptions, 78 yards, TD

==== Week 3: at DC Defenders ====
Week 3: St. Louis Battlehawks at DC Defenders – Game summary

Quarter	1	2	3	4	Total
BattleHawks	8	6	6	8	28
Defenders	14	0	11	9	34

at Audi Field, Washington, DC

- Date: March 5
- Game time: 12:00 p.m. CDT
- Game weather: 62 °F (17 °C)
- Game attendance: 16,212
- Referee: Chris Coyte
- TV announcers (FX): John Schriffen, Tom Luginbill, and Stormy Buonantony

Game information

First quarter

- DC – Ethan Wolf 7-yard pass from Jordan Ta'amu (2-pt Conversion Good by Ethan Wolf), 10:31. Defenders 8–0. Drive: 7 Plays, 77 Yards, 2:26.
- DC – Michael Joseph 42-yard interception return (2-pt Conversion No Good), 9:45. Defenders 14–0. Drive: 2 Plays, 4 Yards, 0:46.
- STL – Brian Hill 8-yard pass from A. J. McCarron (2-pt Conversion Good by Darrius Shepherd), 5:33. Defenders 14–8. Drive: 8 Plays, 73 Yards, 4:12.

Second quarter

- STL – Hakeem Butler 1-yard pass from A. J. McCarron (2-pt Conversion No Good), 0:03. Tied 14–14. Drive: 9 Plays, 75 Yards, 2:20.

Third quarter

- DC – Matt McCrane 41-yard field goal, 9:24. Defenders 17–14. Drive: 11 Plays, 48 Yards, 5:18.
- STL – Jake Sutherland 23-yard pass from A. J. McCarron (2-pt Conversion No Good), 8:26. BattleHawks 20–17. Drive: 2 Plays, 25 Yards, 1:16.
- DC – Jordan Ta'amu 2-yard rush (2-pt Conversion Good by Lucky Jackson), 3:08. Defenders 25–20. Drive: 12 Plays, 81 Yards, 5:18.

Fourth quarter

- DC – Matt McCrane 35-yard field goal, 15:00. Defenders 28–20. Drive: 4 Plays, 7 Yards, 1:40.
- DC – Chris Blair 4-yard pass from D'Eriq King (2-pt Conversion No Good), 6:02. Defenders 34–20. Drive: 12 Plays, 67 Yards, 6:46.
- STL – Steven Mitchell 2-yard pass from A. J. McCarron (2-pt Conversion Good by Steven Mitchell), 0:22. Defenders 34–28. Drive: 1 Play, 2 Yards, 0:00.

Top passers

- STL – A. J. McCarron – 26/42, 262 yards, 4 TD, 2 INT
- DC – Jordan Ta'amu – 11/20, 196 yards, TD

Top rushers

- STL – Brian Hill – 12 rushes, 32 yards
- DC – Abram Smith – 16 rushes, 54 yards

Top receivers

- STL – Hakeem Butler – 9 receptions, 105 yards
- DC – Lucky Jackson – 4 receptions, 89 yards

==== Week 4: vs. Arlington Renegades ====
Week 4: Arlington Renegades at St. Louis BattleHawks – Game summary

Quarter	1	2	3	4	Total
Renegades	0	3	0	8	11
BattleHawks	3	8	6	7	24

at The Dome at America's Center, St. Louis, Missouri

- Date: March 12
- Game time: 3:00 p.m. CDT
- Game weather: 44 °F (7 °C)
- Game attendance: 38,310
- Referee: Mike Vandervelde
- TV announcers (ESPN2): Tom Hart, Greg McElroy, and Cole Cubelic

Game information

First quarter

- STL – Donny Hageman 28-yard field goal, 5:46. BattleHawks 3–0. Drive: 10 Plays, 45 Yards, 5:46.

Second quarter

- ARL – Taylor Russolino 37-yard field goal, 4:35. Tied 3–3. Drive: 4 Plays, 4 Yards, 1:42.
- STL – Darrius Shepherd 27-yard pass from A. J. McCarron (2-pt Conversion Good by Brian Hill), 0:11. BattleHawks 11–3. Drive: 8 Plays, 67 Yards, 4:16.

Third quarter

- STL – Brian Hill 15-yard rush (2-pt Conversion No Good), 6:48. BattleHawks 17–3. Drive: 6 Plays, 68 Yards, 3:12.

Fourth quarter

- ARL – De'Veon Smith 1-yard rush (2-pt Conversion Good by De'Veon Smith), 12:40. BattleHawks 17–11. Drive: 9 Plays, 87 Yards, 4:44.
- STL – Hakeem Butler 25-yard pass from A. J. McCarron (1-pt Conversion Good by Jake Sutherland), 9:55. BattleHawks 24–11. Drive: 6 Plays, 67 Yards, 2:45.

Top passers

- ARL – Kyle Sloter – 23/39, 205 yards, 3 INT
- STL – A. J. McCarron – 20/27, 214 yards, 2 TD, INT

Top rushers

- ARL – De'Veon Smith – 9 rushes, 24 yards
- STL – Brian Hill – 18 rushes, 89 yards

Top receivers

- ARL – Sal Cannella – 6 receptions, 40 yards
- STL – Darrius Shepherd – 8 receptions, 91 yards

==== Week 5: vs. DC Defenders ====
Week 5: DC Defenders at St. Louis BattleHawks – Game summary

Quarter	1	2	3	4	Total
Defenders	0	14	6	8	28
BattleHawks	0	3	9	8	20

at The Dome at America's Center, St. Louis, Missouri

- Date: March 18
- Game time: 6:00 p.m. CDT
- Game weather: 27 °F (−3 °C)
- Game attendance: 35,868
- Referee: Francisco Villar
- TV announcers (FX): John Schriffen, Tom Luginbill, and Stormy Buonantony

Game information

First quarter

Second quarter

- STL – Donny Hageman 36-yard field goal, 10:02. BattleHawks 3–0. Drive: 16 Plays, 72 Yards, 8:55.
- DC – Abram Smith 62-yard rush (2-pt Conversion good by Josh Hammond), 9:22. Defenders 8–3. Drive: 2 Plays, 68 Yards, 0:38.
- DC – Abram Smith 5-yard rush (2-pt Conversion No Good), 1:54. Defenders 14–3. Drive: 3 Plays, 14 Yards, 0:12.

Third quarter

- STL – Donny Hageman 34-yard field goal, 13:16. Defenders 14–6. Drive: 4 Plays, 0 Yards, 1:44.
- DC – Abram Smith 70-yard rush (2-pt Conversion No Good), 12:24. Defenders 20–6. Drive: 2 Plays, 73 Yards, 0:51.
- STL – George Campbell 5-yard pass from A. J. McCarron (2-pt Conversion No Good), 6:20. Defenders 20–12. Drive: 11 Plays, 65 Yards, 5:56.

Fourth quarter

- DC – D'Eriq King 10-yard rush (2-pt Conversion Good by Jordan Ta'amu), 12:16. Defenders 28–12. Drive: 7 Plays, 65 Yards, 3:31.
- STL – Steven Mitchell 50-yard pass from A. J. McCarron (2-pt Conversion Good by Steven Mitchell), 4:19. Defenders 28–20. Drive: 4 Plays, 71 Yards, 1:43.

Top passers

- DC – Jordan Ta'amu – 12/18, 90 yards
- STL – A. J. McCarron – 22/34, 236 yards, 2 TD, INT

Top rushers

- DC – Abram Smith – 23 rushes, 218 yards, 3 TD
- STL – Brian Hill – 14 rushes, 79 yards

Top receivers

- DC – Lucky Jackson – 5 receptions, 54 yards
- STL – Hakeem Butler – 9 receptions, 86 yards

==== Week 6: at Vegas Vipers ====
Week 6: St. Louis BattleHawks at Vegas Vipers – Game summary

Quarter	1	2	3	4	Total
BattleHawks	0	17	6	6	29
Vipers	0	0	0	6	6

at Cashman Field, Las Vegas, Nevada

- Date: March 25
- Game time: 6:00 p.m. CDT
- Game weather: 59 °F (15 °C)
- Game attendance: 6,033
- Referee: Jason Autrey
- TV announcers (FX): Lowell Galindo, Sam Acho, and Taylor McGregor

Game information

First quarter

Second quarter

- STL – Gary Jennings Jr. 4-yard pass from A. J. McCarron (2-pt Conversion Good by Darrius Shepherd), 14:57. BattleHawks 8–0. Drive: 12 Plays, 62 Yards, 7:11.
- STL – Donny Hageman 40-yard field goal, 2:25. BattleHawks 11–0. Drive: 11 Plays, 75 Yards, 6:42.
- STL – Darrius Shepherd 30-yard pass from A. J. McCarron (2-pt Conversion No Good), 0:34. BattleHawks 17–0. Drive: 3 Plays, 57 Yards, 0:50.

Third quarter

- STL – Kareem Walker 1-yard rush (1-pt Conversion No Good), 9:32. BattleHawks 23–0. Drive: 7 Plays, 49 Yards, 4:03.

Fourth quarter

- VGS – John Lovett 17 yard pass from Brett Hundley (2-pt Conversion No Good), 7:05. BattleHawks 23–6. Drive: 5 Plays, 51 Yards, 2:10.
- STL – Darrius Shepherd 6-yard pass from A. J. McCarron (1-pt Conversion No Good), 3:06. BattleHawks 29–6. Drive: 6 Plays, 45 Yards, 3:55.

Top passers

- STL – A. J. McCarron – 23/29, 236 yards, 3 TD
- VGS – Luis Perez – 13/20, 99 yards, 2 INT

Top rushers

- STL – Brian Hill – 14 rushes, 71 yards
- VGS – John Lovett – 6 rushes, 19 yards

Top receivers

- STL – Darrius Shepherd – 7 receptions, 79 yards
- VGS – Jeff Badet – 4 receptions, 34 yards

==== Week 7: at Houston Roughnecks ====
Week 7: St. Louis BattleHawks at Houston Roughnecks – Game summary

Quarter	1	2	3	4	Total
BattleHawks	6	11	0	7	24
Roughnecks	0	9	0	6	15

at TDECU Stadium, Houston, Texas

- Date: April 2
- Game time: 1:00 p.m. CDT
- Game weather: 82 °F (28 °C)
- Game attendance: 12,013
- Referee: Jeff Heaser
- TV announcers (ESPN2): Tom Hart, Greg McElroy, and Cole Cubelic

Game information

First quarter

- STL – Gary Jennings Jr. 14-yard pass from A. J. McCarron (2-pt Conversion No Good), 4:18. BattleHawks 6–0. Drive: 13 Plays, 96 Yards, 7:53.

Second quarter

- HOU – Deontay Burnett 1-yard pass from Cole McDonald (1-pt Conversion No Good), 13:34. Tied 6–6. Drive: 11 plays, 69 yards, 5:44.
- STL – Hakeem Butler 5-yard pass from A. J. McCarron (2-pt Conversion Good by Hakeem Butler), 8:22. BattleHawks 14–6. Drive: 8 plays, 45 yards, 5:12.
- HOU – Hunter Duplessis 25-yard field goal, 3:11. BattleHawks 14–9. Drive: 10 Plays, 63 Yards, 5:11.
- STL – Donny Hageman 59-yard field goal, 0:01. BattleHawks 17–9. Drive: 2 Plays, 8 Yards, 0:05.

Third quarter

Fourth quarter

- HOU – Fumble recovery returned for touchdown by William Likely (2-pt Conversion No Good), 10:44. BattleHawks 17–15. Drive: 1 Play, 0 Yards, 0:23.
- STL – Darrius Shepherd 10-yard pass from A. J. McCarron (1-pt Conversion Good by Brian Hill), 3:54. BattleHawks 24–15. Drive: 11 Plays, 74 Yards, 6:49.

Top passers

- STL – A. J. McCarron – 26/34, 222 yards, 3 TD
- HOU – Cole McDonald – 15/32, 106 yards, TD, INT

Top rushers

- STL – Brian Hill – 11 rushes, 53 yards
- HOU – Max Borghi – 9 rushes, 46 yards

Top receivers

- STL – Darrius Shepherd – 7 receptions, 70 yards, TD
- HOU – Cedric Byrd – 7 receptions, 50 yards

==== Week 8: vs. Vegas Vipers ====
Week 8: Vegas Vipers at St. Louis BattleHawks – Game summary

Quarter	1	2	3	4	OT	Total
Vipers	8	3	0	6	0	17
BattleHawks	0	8	0	9	4	21

at The Dome at America's Center, St. Louis, Missouri

- Date: April 8
- Game time: 12:00 p.m. CDT
- Game weather: 63 °F (17 °C)
- Game attendance: 35,167
- Referee: Mike Vandervelde
- TV announcers (ESPN): Lowell Galindo, Sam Acho and Taylor McGregor

Game information

First quarter

- VGS – John Lovett 5-yard rush (2-pt Conversion Good by Martavis Bryant), 11:26. Vipers 8–0. Drive: 7 Plays, 48 Yards, 3:35.

Second quarter

- VGS – Sam Sloman 23-yard field goal, 14:46. Vipers 11–0. Drive: 16 Plays, 87 Yards, 8:56.
- STL – Hakeem Butler 32-yard pass from Nick Tiano (2-pt Conversion Good by Nick Tiano), 10:57. Vipers 11–8. Drive: 7 Plays, 73 Yards, 3:43.

Third quarter

Fourth quarter

- VGS – Geronimo Allison 27-yard pass from Jalan McClendon (1-pt Conversion No Good), 7:09. Vipers 17–8. Drive: 2 Plays, 27 Yards, 0:44.
- STL – Gary Jennings Jr. 64-yard pass from Sterling Hofrichter (3-pt Conversion No Good), 4:55. Vipers 17–14. Drive: 4 Plays, 68 Yards, 2:14.
- STL – Donny Hageman 34-yard field goal, 0:15. Tied 17–17. Drive: 10 Plays, 44 Yards, 1:45.

Overtime

- STL – Hakeem Butler pass from Nick Tiano for 2 points
- STL – Brian Hill rush for 2 points

Top passers

- VGS – Jalan McClendon – 13/23, 159 yards, 1 TD
- STL – Nick Tiano – 19/34, 194 yards, 1 TD

Top rushers

- VGS – Jalan McClendon – 13 rushes, 62 yards
- STL – Brian Hill – 10 rushes, 35 yards

Top receivers

- VGS – Mathew Sexton – 3 receptions, 27 yards
- STL – Brian Hill – 6 receptions, 37 yards

==== Week 9: vs. Seattle Sea Dragons ====
Week 9: Seattle Sea Dragons at St. Louis BattleHawks – Game summary

Quarter	1	2	3	4	Total
Sea Dragons	8	6	6	10	30
BattleHawks	3	6	3	0	12

at The Dome at America's Center, St. Louis, Missouri

- Date: April 16
- Game time: 2:00 p.m. CDT
- Game weather: 47 °F (8 °C)
- Game attendance: 33,142
- Referee: Reggie Smith
- TV announcers (ESPN): Matt Barrie, Eric Mac Lain, and Tiffany Blackmon

Game information

First quarter

- SEA – T. J. Hammonds 9-yard rush (2-pt Conversion Good by Phillip Lindsay), 7:35. Sea Dragons 8–0. Drive: 12 Plays, 74 Yards, 7:25.
- STL – Donny Hageman 45-yard field goal, 2:48. Sea Dragons 8–3. Drive: 9 Plays, 44 Yards, 4:47.

Second quarter

- STL – Darrius Shepherd 42-yard pass from A. J. McCarron (2-pt Conversion No Good), 9:51. BattleHawks 9–8. Drive: 7 Plays, 92 Yards, 3:51.
- SEA – Jordan Veasy 2-yard pass from Ben DiNucci (2-pt Conversion No Good), 3:09. Sea Dragons 14–9. Drive: 5 Plays, 53 Yards, 2:46.

Third quarter

- SEA – Jahcour Pearson 68-yard pass from Ben DiNucci (3-pt Conversion No Good), 11:36. Sea Dragons 20–9. Drive: 3 Plays, 63 Yards, 1:35.
- STL – Donny Hageman 54-yard field goal, 3:24. Sea Dragons 20–12. Drive: 7 Plays, 24 Yards, 4:19.

Fourth quarter

- SEA – Ben DiNucci 8-yard rush (1-pt Conversion Good by Phillip Lindsay), 4:00. Sea Dragons 27–12. Drive: 3 Plays, 16 Yards, 1:27.
- SEA – Dominik Eberle 36-yard field goal, 0:05. Sea Dragons 30–12. Drive: 7 Plays, 42 Yards, 1:54.

Top passers

- SEA – Ben DiNucci – 21/31, 260 yards, 2 TD
- STL – A. J. McCarron – 18/32, 186 yards, 1 TD

Top rushers

- SEA – Phillip Lindsay – 10 rushes, 17 yards
- STL – Brian Hill – 5 rushes, 11 yards

Top receivers

- SEA – Jahcour Pearson – 7 receptions, 115 yards
- STL – Marcell Ateman – 7 receptions, 99 yards

==== Week 10: vs. Orlando Guardians ====
Week 10: Orlando Guardians at St. Louis BattleHawks – Game summary

Quarter	1	2	3	4	Total
Guardians	6	14	0	8	28
BattleHawks	3	22	14	14	53

at The Dome at America's Center, St. Louis, Missouri

- Date: April 22
- Game time: 11:00 a.m. CDT
- Game weather: 46 °F (8 °C)
- Game attendance: 33,034
- Referee: Michael Vandervelde
- TV announcers (ESPN): Lowell Galindo, Sam Acho, and Taylor McGregor

Game information

First quarter

- ORL – Andrew Jamiel 27-yard pass from Deondre Francois (1-pt Conversion No Good), 5:15. Guardians 6–0. Drive: 11 Plays, 79 Yards, 6:33.
- STL – Donny Hageman 35-yard field goal, 2:25. Guardians 6–3. Drive: 6 Plays, 41 Yards, 2:50.

Second quarter

- STL – Kareem Walker 1-yard rush (2-pt Conversion No Good), 12:27. BattleHawks 9–6. Drive: 7 Plays, 42 Yards, 3:14.
- ORL – Jordan Thomas 84-yard pass from Mac Brown (2-pt Conversion No Good), 9:35. Guardians 12–9. Drive: 4 Plays, 73 Yards, 2:52.
- STL – Hakeem Butler 7-yard pass from A. J. McCarron (2-pt Conversion Good by Marcell Ateman), 6:36. BattleHawks 17–12. Drive: 6 Plays, 70 Yards, 2:59.
- ORL – K. D. Cannon 45-yard pass from Quinten Dormady (2-pt Conversion Good by Andrew Jamiel), 6:19. Guardians 20–17. Drive: 1 Play, 45 Yards, 0:17.
- STL – Jake Sutherland 5-yard pass from A. J. McCarron (2-pt Conversion Good by Hakeem Butler), 0:55. BattleHawks 25–20. Drive: 10 Plays, 66 Yards, 5:24.

Third quarter

- STL – Steven Mitchell 13-yard pass from A. J. McCarron (2-pt Conversion Good by Steven Mitchell), 9:32. BattleHawks 33–20. Drive: 6 Plays, 68 Yards, 2:57.
- STL – Hakeem Butler 66-yard pass from A. J. McCarron (3-pt Conversion No Good), 4:08. BattleHawks 39–20. Drive: 2 Plays, 67 Yards, 0:46.

Fourth quarter

- STL – Darrius Shepherd 4-yard pass from A. J. McCarron (2-pt Conversion No Good), 10:55. BattleHawks 45–20. Drive: 5 Plays, 57 Yards, 2:31.
- ORL – Charleston Rambo 6-yard pass from Quinten Dormady (2-pt Conversion Good by K. D. Cannon), 5:10. BattleHawks 45–28. Drive: 13 Plays, 65 Yards, 5:45.
- STL – Steven Mitchell 16-yard pass from A. J. McCarron (2-pt Conversion Good by Hakeem Butler), 1:55. BattleHawks 53–28. Drive: 6 Plays, 39 Yards, 3:15.

Top passers

- ORL – Quinten Dormady – 18/24, 187 yards, 2 TD
- STL – A. J. McCarron – 28/35, 420 yards, 6 TD

Top rushers

- ORL – Devin Darrington – 6 rushes, 0 yards
- STL – Mataeo Durant – 8 rushes, 36 yards

Top receivers

- ORL – Charleston Rambo – 5 receptions, 57 yards
- STL – Hakeem Butler – 9 receptions, 164 yards

== Standings ==
2023 XFL standings
North Division
Team	W	L	PCT	GB	TD+/-	TD+	TD-	DIV	PF	PA	DIFF	STK
(y) DC Defenders	9	1	.900	–	-2	33	35	6–0	298	240	58	W3
(x) Seattle Sea Dragons	7	3	.700	2	+10	30	20	3–3	243	177	66	W2
(e) St. Louis Battlehawks	7	3	.700	2	+9	32	23	3–3	249	202	47	W1
(e) Vegas Vipers	2	8	.200	7	0	28	28	0–6	184	252	-68	L3
South Division
Team	W	L	PCT	GB	TD+/-	TD+	TD-	DIV	PF	PA	DIFF	STK
(y) Houston Roughnecks	7	3	.700	–	+4	30	26	6–0	247	182	65	W3
(x) Arlington Renegades	4	6	.400	3	-8	15	23	3–3	146	194	-48	L2
(e) San Antonio Brahmas	3	7	.300	4	-8	16	24	3–3	169	183	-14	L1
(e) Orlando Guardians	1	9	.100	6	-5	32	37	0–6	204	310	-106	L3
(x)–clinched playoff berth; (y)–clinched division; (e)–eliminated from playoff contention

== Staff ==
St. Louis Battlehawks staff
Front office: Director of team operations – Anastasia Ali; Director of player personnel – Dave Boller; Head coach: General manager/Head coach – Anthony Becht; Offensive coaches: Offensive coordinator – Bruce Gradkowski; Running backs - Art Valero; Wide Receivers - Ricky Proehl; Tight ends/special teams - Tory Woodbury; Offensive line – Pat Pereles; Offensive assistant - Mark Lee	Defensive coaches: Defensive coordinator – Donnie Abraham; Defensive line – La'Roi Glover; Linebackers – Chris Claiborne; Quality Control/Asst. Defensive Backs - Devin Abraham; Team operations: Athletic Trainer – Eric Avila; Equipment Manager – Todd Hewitt; Video Manager – Sean Hollister

*Linebackers coach Dave Steckel left the team after Week 2. Chris Claiborne took over Week 3.
