= Taniela Tupou =

Taniela Tupou may refer to:

- Tani Tupou (born 1992), American football player
- Taniela Tupou (rugby union) (born 1996), Tongan-born Australian rugby union player

== See also ==
- Daniel Tupou (born 1991), Australian rugby league player
