= Erik Hansen (American football) =

American football player (born 1999)

No. 37
- Position: Defensive end

Personal information
- Born: March 9, 1999 (age 27); Burlington, Illinois, U.S.
- Listed height: 6 ft 2 in (1.88 m)
- Listed weight: 250 lb (113 kg)

Career information
- High school: Central (Burlington, Illinois)
- College: Upper Iowa (2017–2021)
- NFL draft: 2022: undrafted

Career history
- Seattle Sea Dragons (2023)*; St. Louis Battlehawks (2023)
- * Offseason or practice squad member only

Erik Hansen (born March 9, 1999) is an American former football linebacker. He played college football for Upper Iowa University where he was a two-time All-American. He broke the Upper Iowa record for sacks in a game (four), sacks in a season (12.5), and career sacks (25). He has previously played for the Seattle Sea Dragons, also of the XFL.

== Early life and education ==
Hansen was born on March 9, 1999, in Illinois. He attended Central High School in Burlington, Illinois where he played football and wrestled. He committed to Upper Iowa University to play college football.

== Professional career ==
Pre-draft measurables
Height	Weight	Arm length	Hand span	40-yard dash	20-yard shuttle	Three-cone drill	Vertical jump	Broad jump	Bench press
6 ft 2 in (1.88 m)	250 lb (113 kg)	31+^{1}/_{2} in (0.80 m)	9+3/_{8} in (0.23 m)	4.61 s	x s	7.33 s	31 in (0.78 m)	9 ft 7 in (2.95 m)	27 reps
All values from UNI Pro day results

=== Seattle Sea Dragons ===
Hansen was selected by the Seattle Sea Dragons in the seventh round of the 2023 XFL draft. He was released from his contract on February 11, 2023.

=== St. Louis Battlehawks ===
Hansen signed with the St. Louis Battlehawks on March 15, 2023. He was not part of the roster after the 2024 UFL dispersal draft on January 15, 2024.
