= Jacob Saylors =

American football player (born 2000)

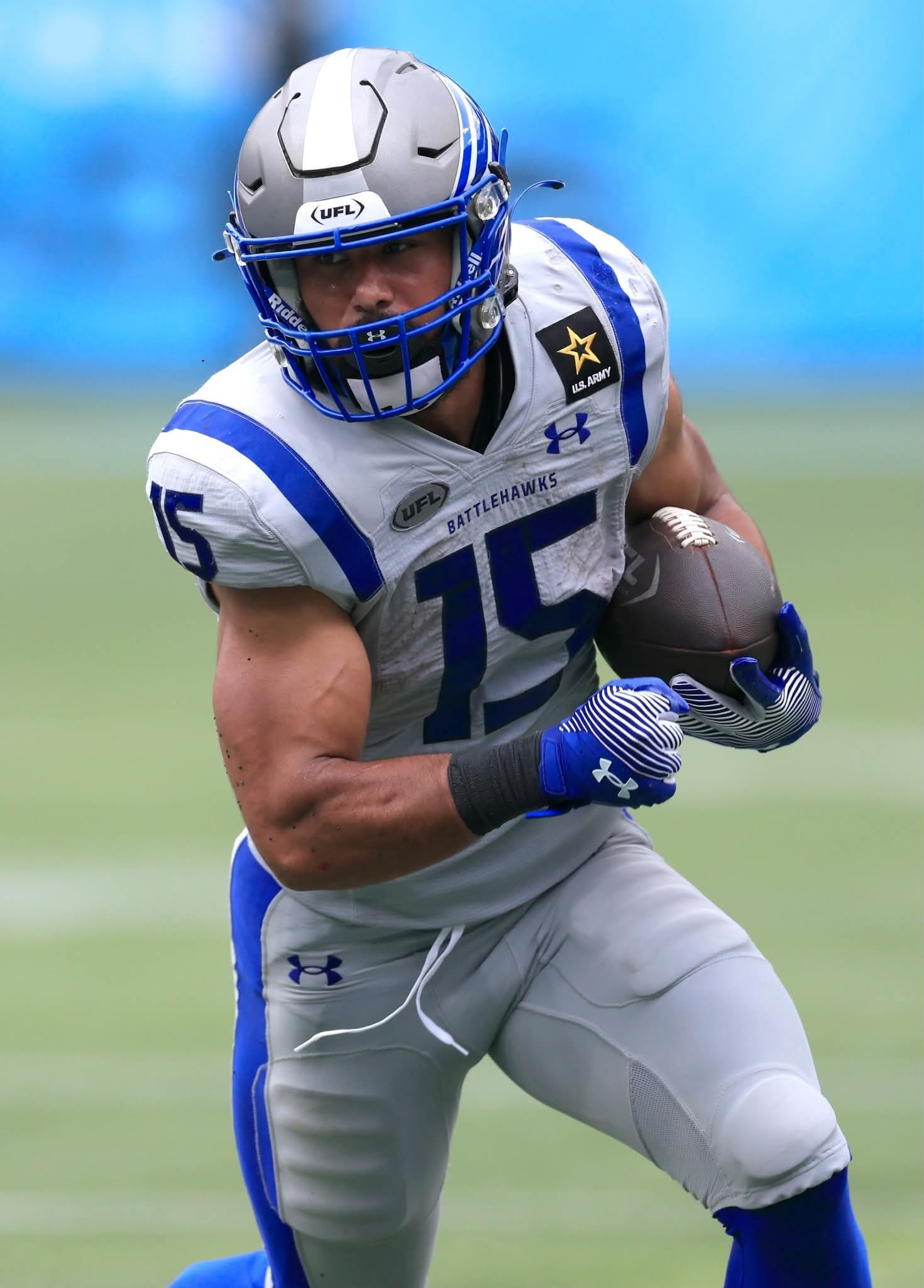
- Saylors with the St. Louis Battlehawks in 2024

No. 25 – Detroit Lions
- Position: Running back
- Roster status: Active

Personal information
- Born: March 8, 2000 (age 26); Jasper, Tennessee, U.S.
- Listed height: 5 ft 11 in (1.80 m)
- Listed weight: 195 lb (88 kg)

Career information
- High school: Marion County
- College: East Tennessee State (2018–2022)
- NFL draft: 2023: undrafted

Career history
- Cincinnati Bengals (2023)*; Atlanta Falcons (2023)*; St. Louis Battlehawks (2024); New York Giants (2024)*; Cleveland Browns (2024)*; St. Louis Battlehawks (2025); Detroit Lions (2025–present)
- * Offseason or practice squad member only

Awards and highlights
- 2× All-UFL Team (2024, 2025); UFL Rushing Yards Leader (2024); Second-team All-American (2021); First-team All-SoCon (2021); SoCon All-Freshman Team (2018)

Career NFL statistics as of Week 10, 2026
- Rushing yards: 20
- Rushing average: 2.5
- Return yards: 1346
- Stats at Pro Football Reference

Jacob Saylors (born March 8, 2000) is an American professional football kick returner and running back for the Detroit Lions of the National Football League (NFL). He played college football for the East Tennessee State Buccaneers and was signed by the Cincinnati Bengals as an undrafted free agent following the 2023 NFL Draft. With the St. Louis Battlehawks, Saylors was named to the All-UFL team in 2024 and 2025.

== College career ==
Saylors played college football at East Tennessee State, where he rushed for 3,861 yards, and 33 touchdowns.

=== Statistics ===
Year	Team	Games		Rushing				Receiving			
Year	Team	GP	GS	Att	Yards	Avg	TD	Rec	Yards	Avg	TD
2018	East Tennessee State	11	1	86	615	7.6	4	23	219	9.5	0
2019	East Tennessee State	11	5	112	653	5.8	4	16	150	9.4	0
2020	East Tennessee State	5	0	42	257	6.1	0	12	108	9.0	1
2021	East Tennessee State	13	5	143	1,019	7.1	10	19	143	7.5	1
2022	East Tennessee State	11	11	225	1,317	5.9	15	21	159	7.6	1
Career		51	22	608	3,861	6.4	33	91	779	8.6	3

== Professional career ==
Pre-draft measurables
Height	Weight	Arm length	Hand span	Wingspan	40-yard dash	10-yard split	20-yard split	20-yard shuttle	Three-cone drill	Vertical jump	Broad jump	Bench press
5 ft 10 1/8 in (1.78 m)	199 lb (90 kg)	29 in (0.74 m)	9 in (0.23 m)	5 ft 8 1/2 in (1.74 m)	4.66 s	1.60 s	2.67 s	4.50 s	7.65 s	32.0 in (0.81 m)	9 ft 4 in (2.84 m)	13 reps
All values from Pro Day

=== Cincinnati Bengals ===
After going undrafted in the 2023 NFL draft, Saylors signed with the Cincinnati Bengals on April 30, 2023. He was waived by the Bengals on August 29.

=== Atlanta Falcons ===
On October 18, 2023, Saylors was signed to the Atlanta Falcons' practice squad. He was waived on January 2, 2024, with an injury settlement.

=== St. Louis Battlehawks (first stint) ===
On February 5, 2024, Saylors signed with the St. Louis Battlehawks of the United Football League (UFL). He led the league in rushing yards, and was named to the All-UFL team.

=== New York Giants ===
On June 18, 2024. Saylors signed with the New York Giants. He was waived by the Giants on August 12.

=== Cleveland Browns ===
On August 22, 2024, Saylors signed with the Cleveland Browns, but was waived later that week.

=== St. Louis Battlehawks (second stint) ===
On November 5, 2024, Saylors re-signed with the Battlehawks.

=== Detroit Lions ===
On July 29, 2025, Saylors signed with the Detroit Lions. He was waived on August 26 as part of final roster cuts, and re-signed to the practice squad. He was promoted to the active roster on September 6. In his first NFL regular season game, Saylors primarily played as a return specialist, returning four kickoffs for a total of 92 yards.

On January 5, 2026, the Lions signed Saylors to a one-year contract extension.

== Career statistics ==
=== UFL career statistics ===
Regular season

Year	Team	Games		Rushing					Receiving				
Year	Team	GP	GS	Att	Yds	Avg	Lng	TD	Rec	Yds	Avg	Lng	TD
2024	STL	9	6	94	461	4.9	57	5	23	152	6.6	19	3
2025	STL	9	9	113	499	4.4	25	5	22	245	11.1	34	0
Career		18	15	207	960	4.6	57	10	45	397	8.8	34	3

Postseason

Year	Team	Games		Rushing					Receiving				
Year	Team	GP	GS	Att	Yds	Avg	Lng	TD	Rec	Yds	Avg	Lng	TD
2024	STL	1	1	14	79	5.6	23	0	1	12	12.0	12	0
2025	STL	1	1	9	45	5.0	11	1	3	27	9.0	17	0
Career		2	2	23	124	5.4	23	1	4	39	9.8	17	0

=== NFL career statistics ===
Regular season

Year	Tea	Games		Rushing					Receiving					Kick returns					Fumbles	
Year	Tea	GP	GS	Att	Yds	Avg	Lng	TD	Rec	Yds	Avg	Lng	TD	Ret	Yds	Avg	Lng	TD	Fum	Lost
2025	DET	16	0	2	11	5.5	9	0	—	—	—	—	—	33	897	27.2	39	0	0	0
Career		16	0	2	11	5.5	9	0	—	—	—	—	—	33	897	27.2	39	0	0	0
