= Nick Tiano =

American football player (born 1996)

No. 14
- Position: Quarterback

Personal information
- Born: December 10, 1996 (age 29); Chattanooga, Tennessee, U.S.
- Listed height: 6 ft 4 in (1.93 m)
- Listed weight: 231 lb (105 kg)

Career information
- High school: Baylor (Chattanooga)
- College: Mississippi State (2015–2016); Chattanooga (2017–2019)
- NFL draft: 2020: undrafted

Career history
- Houston Texans (2020)*; Toronto Argonauts (2021)*; Montreal Alouettes (2021)*; St. Louis BattleHawks (2023)
- * Offseason or practice squad member only

Nicklas Vincent Tiano (born December 10, 1996) is an American former professional football quarterback. He played college football for the Mississippi State Bulldogs before transferring to the Chattanooga Mocs. He also was a member of the Houston Texans of the National Football League (NFL), and had brief stints with the Toronto Argonauts and Montreal Alouettes of the Canadian Football League (CFL).

== Early life ==
Tiano was born on December 10, 1996, in Chattanooga, Tennessee. He played high school football for Baylor School in Chattanooga. He was the top quarterback recruit for the class of 2015 in Tennessee at Baylor School. He was a consensus three-star athlete. In his senior season he was 137 of 224 for 2,096 yards, sixteen touchdowns, and three touchdowns in 2014. He committed to Mississippi State University in June 2014.

College recruiting
Name	Hometown	School	Height	Weight	Commit date
Nick Tiano; QB	Chattanooga, Tennessee	Baylor School	6 ft 4 in (1.93 m)	215 lb (98 kg)	Jun 5, 2014
Nick Tiano; QB	Recruit ratings: Scout: Rivals: 247Sports: ESPN:				
Overall recruit ranking: 247Sports: 825
Note: In many cases, Scout, Rivals, 247Sports, On3, and ESPN may conflict in their listings of height and weight.; In these cases, the average was taken. ESPN grades are on a 100-point scale.; Sources: "2014 Team Ranking". Rivals.com.

== College career ==
=== Mississippi State ===
In 2015, Tiano was redshirted.

In 2016, Tiano saw action in four games for the Bulldogs. He completed his singular pass attempt on the season for five yards against Auburn. After the season he announced that he would transfer from Mississippi State after not seeing much action that year.

=== Chattanooga ===
On December 5, 2016, Tiano announced he would transfer to University of Tennessee at Chattanooga to play for the Mocs. He started his career off at Chattanooga started the first four games of the season in place of suspended Alejandro Bennifield. In his first four starts he went 87 of 158 for 873 yards, he had six touchdowns to six interceptions as well. He made his first collegiate start against No. 5 ranked Jacksonville State, he went 23 of 43 for 218 yards, one touchdown, and two interceptions in a 13–27 loss. He also started against No. 12 LSU, UT Martin, and VMI, the team would lose 10–45 against LSU, 7–21 against UT Martin, but would win 63–7 against SoCon opponent VMI. He also started against Western Carolina where the team lost 7–45, Tiano left the game early due to injury. Tiano would miss the last six games of the season as the team would finish 3–8 (3–5 in conference play).

In 2018, Tiano's junior season, he played in all eleven games for the Mocs. He went 233 of 378 for 2,710 yards, fifteen touchdowns, and six interceptions. He finished the year third in the SoCon in completions per game (21.2), passing yards per game (246.4), and total offense per game (268.1). He also finished fourth in the SoCon in passing touchdowns (15) and completion percentage (61.6%). His 2,710 passing yards would be good enough for fifth-most in Chattanooga season history, his 233 completions would be third-most, his six interceptions would be the lowest ever by a Mocs' quarterback to throw for 200 passes, alongside his 2,949 would be seventh-most in a season. The team started the season off 4–0, beating Tennessee Tech 34–10, The Citadel 29–28 in overtime, UT Martin 34–24 and No. 17 Samford 27–10. Chattanooga would then lose to East Tennessee State 14–17, they were down 17–0 until they would score fourteen unanswered against the Buccaneers, starting off with a three-yard touchdown pass from Tiano to Bryce Nunnelly. Chattanooga would hold ETSU to a three and out before the Mocs scored a three-yard touchdown run from Tyrell Price to make it 14–17 with four minutes left. They would once again get another stop and would get the ball back with 97 seconds left on the clock. With eleven seconds left Tiano would pass to Joseph Parker who would lateral the ball to Nunnelly who would fumble and would be the end of the game, ending the Mocs' comeback. The team would go on to lose four of their next six to finish the season 6–5, a three win improvement in comparison to the previous year.

In 2019, Tiano started all twelve games for Chattanooga going 174 of 329 for 2,242 yards, fourteen touchdowns, and a career-high ten interceptions. He was named to the NFF Hampshire Society after the season. His 2,242 would be good enough for ninth-most in Chattanooga single season history, his 329 pass attempts were good enough for tenth all-time. He also added 384 rushing yards on 85 carries alongside nine rushing touchdowns, compared to only one rushing touchdown his previous four seasons. In November, Tiano was named SoCon Offensive Player of the Month, the first to do so since Derrick Craine four years earlier, after averaging 444.1 yards per game against SoCon opponents. In those four games he had eleven touchdowns, rushing for a touchdown in each of those games. He opened the four game stretch with 164 yards and a touchdown in a loss against No. 13 Furman, then came back next game against Samford where he ran for a career-high 100 yards alongside 296 passing yards and two passing touchdowns. Then in a comeback win at The Citadel he throw for 268 yards and two touchdowns, including a 31-yard game-winning touchdown run. He would finish the four game stretch with a loss against VMI where he had two more passing touchdowns and 230 yards through the air. The team finished 6–6. After the season Tiano was invited to the 2020 NFLPA Collegiate Bowl where he won the game's MVP award after going eight for ten for 135 yards and one touchdown.

=== Statistics ===
Year	Team	Games		Passing							Rushing			
Year	Team	GP	Record	Comp	Att	Pct	Yards	Avg	TD	Int	Att	Yards	Avg	TD
2015	Mississippi State	DNP												
2016	Mississippi State	5	0–0	1	1	100.0	5	5.0	0	0	0	0	0.0	0
2017	Chattanooga	5	1−4	87	158	55.1	873	5.5	6	6	53	121	2.3	0
2018	Chattanooga	11	6−5	233	378	61.6	2,170	5.7	15	6	85	263	3.1	1
2019	Chattanooga	12	6−6	174	329	52.9	2,242	6.8	14	10	85	384	4.5	9
Career		33	13−15	495	866	57.2	5,830	6.7	35	22	223	768	3.4	10

He finished his career ninth in all-time wins with thirteen, seventh all-time in career passing yards with 5,825, fifth in career attempts with 865, fourth in career completions with 494, seventh in career completion percentage with 57.1%, tied sixth in passing touchdowns with 35 alongside Mickey Brokas, tied fifth in career 200-yard passing games with thirteen alongside Brian Hampton, and seventh all-time in total offensive yards with 6,569.

== Professional career ==
Pre-draft measurables
Height	Weight	Arm length	Hand span	40-yard dash	10-yard split	20-yard split	20-yard shuttle	Three-cone drill	Vertical jump	Broad jump
6 ft 4 in (1.93 m)	231 lb (105 kg)	32 5/8 in (0.83 m)	9 7/8 in (0.25 m)	4.79 s	x s	x s	x s	x s	x	x x
All values from Chattanooga pro day.

=== Houston Texans ===
On April 27, 2020, after going undrafted in the 2020 NFL draft, Tiano signed with the Houston Texans of the National Football League (NFL). On July 27, 2020, he was waived by the Texans.

=== Toronto Argonauts ===
After being released by the Texans, Tiano signed with the Toronto Argonauts of the Canadian Football League (CFL) on February 15, 2021. On July 20, 2021, he was cut by the Argonauts during the first wave of training camp cuts.

=== Montreal Alouettes ===
On July 30, 2021, Tiano was signed to the Montreal Alouettes' practice roster. On September 21, 2021, he was released from the team to make room for Shea Patterson.

=== St. Louis BattleHawks ===
During the supplemental draft after the 2023 XFL draft Tiano was assigned to the St. Louis BattleHawks of the XFL. Tiano led the BattleHawks to a Week 8 overtime win during the 2023 XFL season but days later was placed on injured reserve. He was released on February 12, 2024.

== Career statistics ==
Year	League	Team	Games			Passing								Rushing			
Year	League	Team	GP	GS	Record	Cmp	Att	Pct	Yds	Avg	TD	Int	Rtg	Att	Yds	Avg	TD
2023	XFL	STL	2	1	1-0	20	36	55.6	199	5.5	1	2	57.5	8	51	6.4	0

== Personal life ==
Tiano is the son of Jan and Vince Tiano, he has one sister. He majored in business management. He is currently the founder and head coach of 423 Performance.
