= Tani Tupou =

American football player and rugby union player (born 1992)

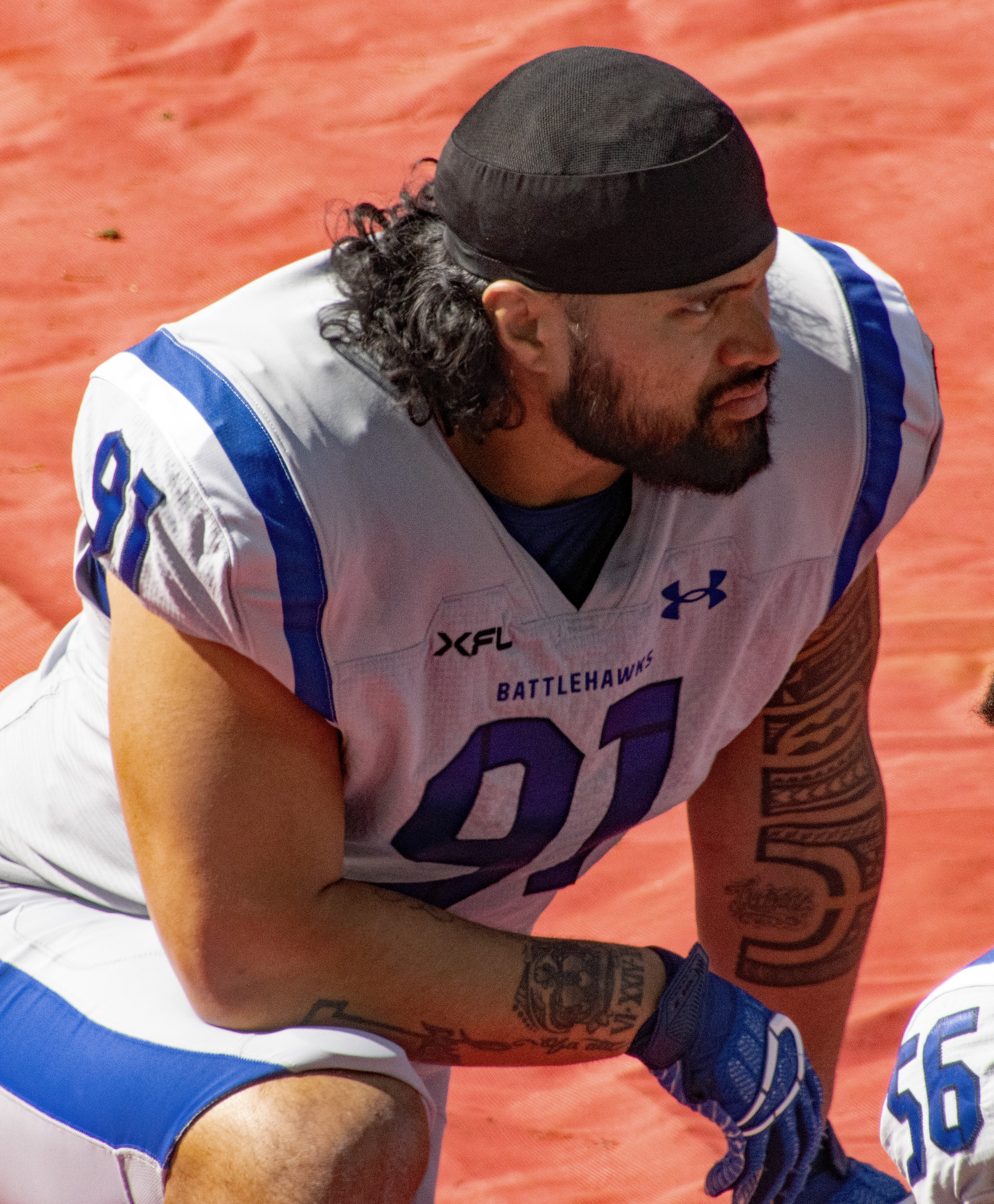
- Tupou with the St. Louis BattleHawks in 2023

No. 44, 93
- Position: Defensive tackle

Personal information
- Born: December 13, 1992 (age 33); Marysville, Washington, U.S.
- Listed height: 6 ft 1 in (1.85 m)
- Listed weight: 284 lb (129 kg)

Career information
- High school: Archbishop Murphy (Everett, Washington)
- College: Washington
- NFL draft: 2016: undrafted

Career history
- Seattle Seahawks (2016); Atlanta Falcons (2017); Arizona Cardinals (2018)*; San Diego Fleet (2019); Seattle Dragons (2020); St. Louis BattleHawks (2023)
- * Offseason or practice squad member only

Awards and highlights
- Second-team All-Pac-12 (2015)

Career NFL statistics
- Games played: 2
- Stats at Pro Football Reference

Taniela Tupou (born December 13, 1992) is an American former professional football player who was a defensive tackle in the National Football League (NFL). He played college football for the Washington Huskies. He also plays rugby for the Seattle Seawolves of Major League Rugby (MLR). His position is at prop.

== Early life ==
Tupou attended Archbishop Murphy high school in Everett, Washington, where he played football as a strongside defensive end and as a tight end. He led the Wildcats to the WIAA State Championship game at the Tacoma Dome in 2010. Tupou graduated from Archbishop Murphy in 2011. Tupou is of Tongan and Hawaiian descent.

== College career ==
Tupou verbally committed to the University of Washington on April 8, 2010. Tupou redshirted his first year on campus before playing the next four seasons. In his five years at Washington Tupou appeared in 46 games for the Huskies as a defensive tackle and recorded 59 tackles.

== Professional career ==
=== Seattle Seahawks ===
On May 9, 2016, Seattle Seahawks signed Tupou as a fullback / defensive tackle after participating in their rookie mini-camp. He played in the team's season-opening victory over the Miami Dolphins on September 11.

On September 13, 2016, Tupou was released by the Seahawks.

=== Atlanta Falcons ===
During April 2017, Tupou played as a defensive tackle for The Spring League, a developmental football instructional league. Tupou received an invitation to attend rookie minicamp for the Atlanta Falcons. On May 14, 2017, following minicamp, Tupou signed with the Falcons. He was waived on September 2, 2017 and was signed to the Falcons' practice squad the next day. He was released on September 6, 2017. He was signed to the practice squad on September 19. He was promoted to the active roster on October 10, 2017. He was waived on October 19, 2017 and was later re-signed to the practice squad. He signed a reserve/future contract with the Falcons on January 15, 2018.

On April 11, 2018, the Falcons waived Tupou with a non-football injury designation.

=== Arizona Cardinals ===
On August 22, 2018, Tupou signed with the Arizona Cardinals. He was waived on September 1, 2018.

=== San Diego Fleet ===
In 2019, Tupou joined the San Diego Fleet of the Alliance of American Football. In the first game of the season, Tupou recorded 2 tackles and a sack, and finished the year with 13 tackles and 4 quarterback hits. The league ceased operations in April 2019.

=== Seattle Dragons ===
During the 2020 XFL draft, the Seattle Dragons selected Tupou in the seventh round. He was placed on injured reserve before the start of the season on January 21, 2020. He was activated from injured reserve on March 11, 2020. He had his contract terminated when the league suspended operations on April 10, 2020.

=== The Spring League ===
Tupou signed with the Jousters of The Spring League in October 2020.

=== St. Louis BattleHawks ===
On November 17, 2022, Tupou was selected by the St. Louis BattleHawks of the XFL. He was not part of the roster after the 2024 UFL dispersal draft on January 15, 2024.

== Professional rugby career ==
After playing in the XFL and the league folded in 2020, Tupou tried to get back in the NFL by doing combines on the side. Tupou then got a call from Peter Pasque, the general manager of the American Raptors in Glendale, Colorado and asked if he wanted to try rugby out. After stepping onto the pitch for the Raptors, Tupou said, "I just fell in love with the game".

On January 27, 2022, Tupou signed with his hometown Seattle Seawolves of the Major League Rugby (MLR) as a part of their front row. The crossover athlete marks his third professional contract with a Seattle team.
