= Steven Mitchell (American football) =

American football player (born 1994)

Steven Mitchell Jr.
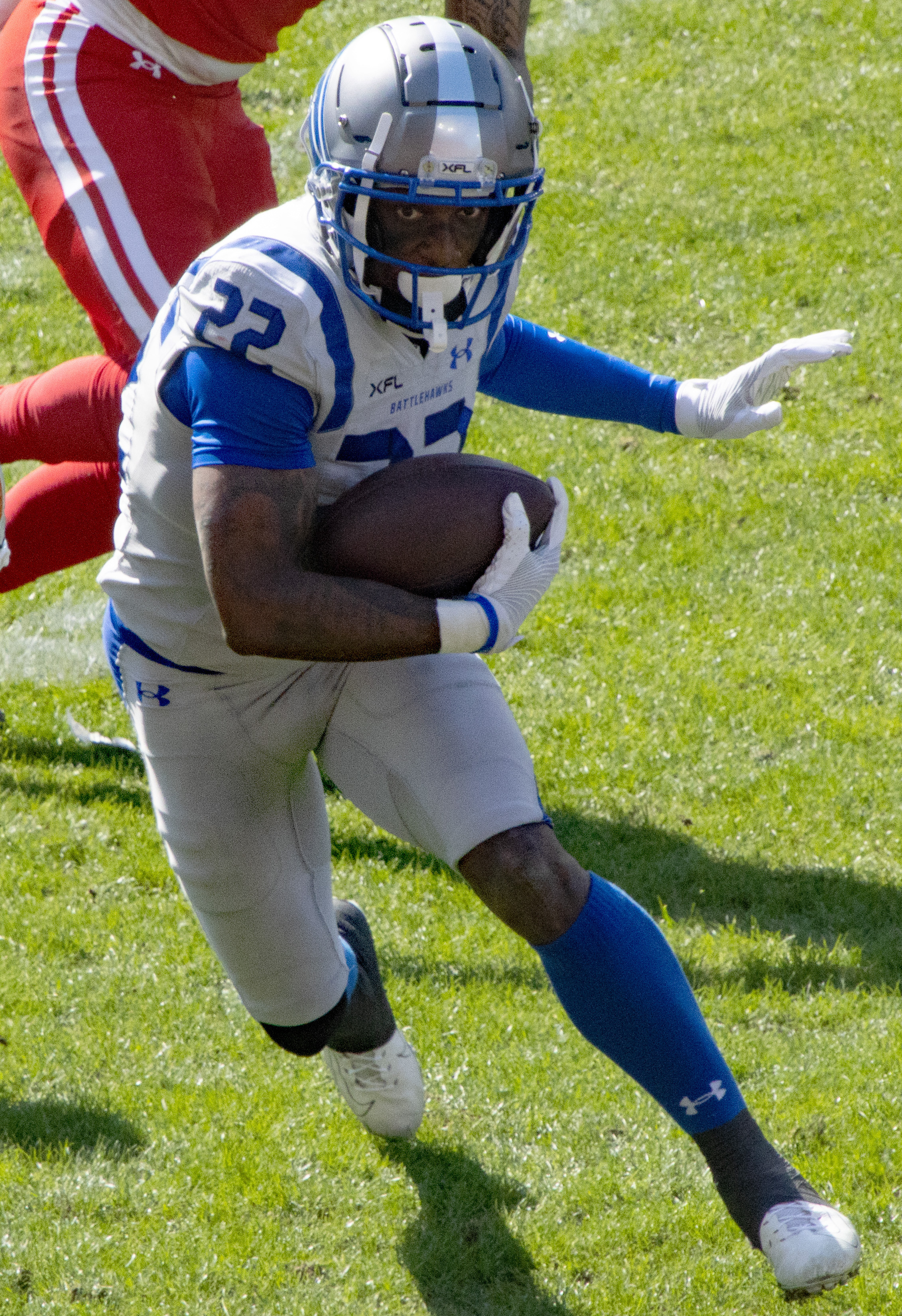
- Mitchell with the St. Louis BattleHawks in 2023

No. 11, 22
- Position: Wide receiver

Personal information
- Born: May 2, 1994 (age 32); Pasadena, California, U.S.
- Listed height: 5 ft 10 in (1.78 m)
- Listed weight: 189 lb (86 kg)

Career information
- High school: Bishop Alemany (Mission Hills, California)
- College: USC
- NFL draft: 2018: undrafted

Career history
- Los Angeles Rams (2018)*; Houston Texans (2018–2020); St. Louis Battlehawks (2023–2024)
- * Offseason or practice squad member only

Career NFL statistics
- Receptions: 7
- Receiving yards: 97
- Stats at Pro Football Reference

Steven Mitchell Jr. (born May 2, 1994) is an American former professional football player who was a wide receiver for the Houston Texans of the National Football League (NFL) from 2018 to 2020. He played college football for the USC Trojans and signed with the Los Angeles Rams as an undrafted free agent in 2018.

== Early life ==
Mitchell grew up in Pasadena, California, and attended Bishop Alemany High School.

== College career ==
Mitchell attended the University of Southern California, where he played college football for the Trojans. His career at USC was marred by two knee injuries, but he was named Honorable Mention All-Pac-12 as a junior.

== Professional career ==
Pre-draft measurables
Height	Weight	Arm length	Hand span	40-yard dash	20-yard shuttle	Three-cone drill	Vertical jump	Broad jump	Bench press
5 ft 10 1/4 in (1.78 m)	189 lb (86 kg)	30 3/8 in (0.77 m)	9 3/8 in (0.24 m)	4.56 s	4.4 s	6.75 s	32.5 in (0.83 m)	10 ft 1 in (3.07 m)	13 reps
All values from NFL Combine

=== Los Angeles Rams ===
After going undrafted in the 2018 NFL draft, Mitchell signed with the Los Angeles Rams. Mitchell signed with the Los Angeles Rams as an undrafted free agent on May 2, 2018. He was waived on September 1, 2018 and was signed to the practice squad the next day. He was released on October 23, 2018.

=== Houston Texans ===
On October 29, 2018, Mitchell was signed to the Houston Texans' practice squad. He was promoted to the active roster on December 24, 2018. The Texans waived him on August 31, 2019, during final roster cuts. On September 1, 2019, Mitchell was signed to the Texans' practice squad. He was promoted to the active roster on October 23, 2019. He was waived on November 21, but re-signed two days later.

On September 5, 2020, Mitchell was waived by the Texans and signed to the practice squad the next day. He was elevated to the active roster on November 25, December 5, December 12, December 19, and December 26 for the team's weeks 12, 13, 14, 15, and 16 games against the Detroit Lions, Indianapolis Colts, Chicago Bears, Colts, and Cincinnati Bengals, and reverted to the practice squad after each game. On January 2, 2021, he was signed to the active roster. He was waived after the season on April 12, 2021.

=== St. Louis Battlehawks ===
Mitchell was selected by the St. Louis Battlehawks in the 2023 XFL draft in November 2022. He re-signed with the team on January 23, 2024. He was waived on March 22, 2024. He was re-signed on April 23, 2024.
