= Hakeem Butler =

American football player (born 1996)

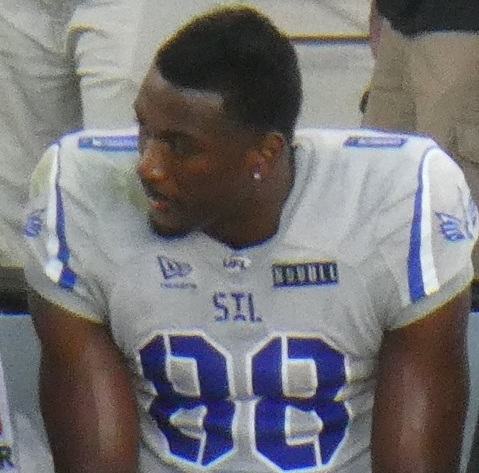
- Butler with the St. Louis Battlehawks in 2026

Profile
- Position: Wide receiver

Personal information
- Born: May 16, 1996 (age 30); Baltimore, Maryland, U.S.
- Listed height: 6 ft 5 in (1.96 m)
- Listed weight: 242 lb (110 kg)

Career information
- High school: Travis (Pecan Grove, Texas)
- College: Iowa State (2015–2018)
- NFL draft: 2019: 4th round, 103rd overall pick

Career history
- Arizona Cardinals (2019); Carolina Panthers (2020)*; Philadelphia Eagles (2020); BC Lions (2022)*; Edmonton Elks (2022); St. Louis Battlehawks (2023); Pittsburgh Steelers (2023)*; St. Louis Battlehawks (2024); Cincinnati Bengals (2024)*; St. Louis Battlehawks (2025–2026); Denver Broncos (2026)*
- * Offseason or practice squad member only

Awards and highlights
- 2× UFL Offensive Player of the Year (2024, 2026); 2× All-UFL Team (2024, 2026); 2× UFL receiving yards leader (2024, 2026); All-XFL Team (2023); XFL receiving touchdowns leader (2023); Second-team All-American (2018); Second-team All-Big 12 (2018)
- Stats at Pro Football Reference

Hakeem Butler (born May 16, 1996) is an American professional football wide receiver. He played college football at Iowa State, and was selected by the Arizona Cardinals in the fourth round of the 2019 NFL draft. He has also been a member of the Carolina Panthers, Philadelphia Eagles, BC Lions, Edmonton Elks, Pittsburgh Steelers, Cincinnati Bengals, St. Louis Battlehawks, and Denver Broncos.

== Early life ==
Butler was born in Baltimore, Maryland, on May 16, 1996. His mother, Sherryl, died from breast cancer when Butler was 16. He has a sister and a younger brother. He then moved to Houston, Texas, to live with his aunt and uncle, and his cousins Aaron and Andrew Harrison, former Kentucky basketball stars. Butler attended Travis High School in Fort Bend, Texas. He committed to Iowa State University to play college football, choosing it over schools such as New Mexico and Houston.

== College career ==
After redshirting his first year at Iowa State in 2015, Butler played in 11 games in 2016 and had nine receptions for 134 yards and two touchdowns. As a sophomore in 2017, he had 41 receptions for 697 yards and seven touchdowns. As a junior in 2018, he had 60 receptions for 1,318 yards and nine touchdowns, breaking a school record for single season receiving yards. After the season, Butler decided to forgo his senior year and enter the 2019 NFL draft.

== Professional career ==
Pre-draft measurables
| Height | Weight | Arm length | Hand span | Wingspan | 40-yard dash | 10-yard split | 20-yard split | 20-yard shuttle | Three-cone drill | Vertical jump | Broad jump | Bench press |
|---|---|---|---|---|---|---|---|---|---|---|---|---|
| 6 ft 5 3/8 in (1.97 m) | 227 lb (103 kg) | 35 1/4 in (0.90 m) | 10 3/4 in (0.27 m) | 6 ft 11 7/8 in (2.13 m) | 4.48 s | 1.51 s | 2.62 s | 4.16 s | 7.09 s | 36 in (0.91 m) | 10 ft 8 in (3.25 m) | 18 reps |
All values from NFL Combine/Pro Day

=== Arizona Cardinals ===
Butler was selected by the Arizona Cardinals in the fourth round (103rd overall) in the 2019 NFL draft. He was placed on injured reserve on August 25, 2019, after suffering a broken hand, causing him to miss his entire rookie season.

On September 4, 2020, Butler was waived by the Cardinals.

=== Carolina Panthers ===
On September 18, 2020, Butler was signed to the practice squad of the Carolina Panthers.

=== Philadelphia Eagles ===
On September 29, 2020, Butler was signed to the Philadelphia Eagles active roster off the Panthers' practice squad and was converted into a tight end. He was waived on October 31 and re-signed to the practice squad two days later.

Butler signed a reserve/future contract with the Eagles on January 4, 2021. On August 23, Butler was waived by the Eagles.

=== BC Lions ===
On February 22, 2022, Butler signed with the BC Lions of the Canadian Football League (CFL). He was released in early round of cuts at training camp on May 23.

=== Edmonton Elks ===
Butler was signed by the Edmonton Elks of the CFL on July 5, 2022, and placed on the team's practice roster. He was released by the Elks on August 16.

=== St. Louis Battlehawks (first stint) ===
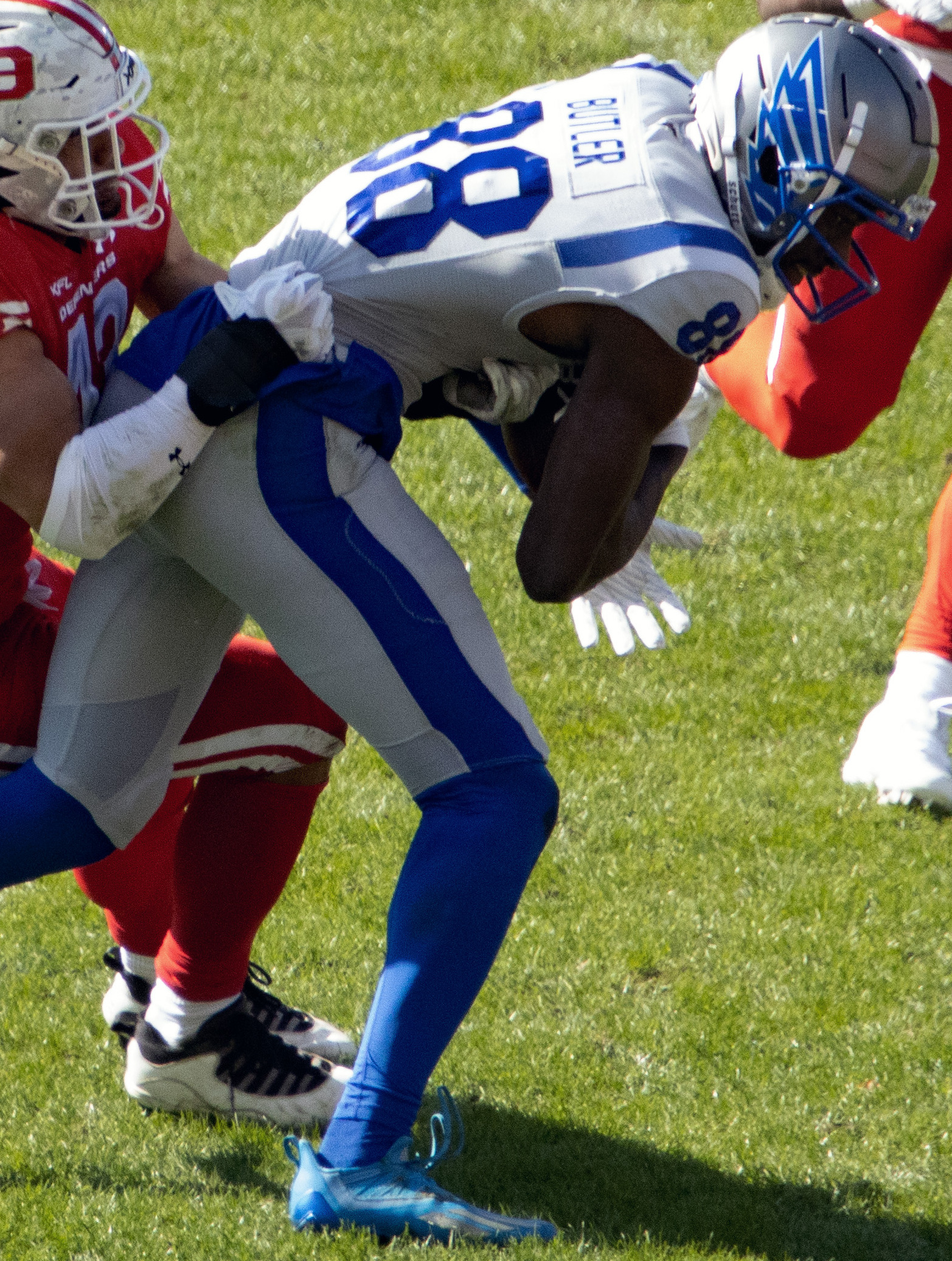
Butler in 2023

On January 1, 2023, Butler was selected by the St. Louis BattleHawks of the XFL in the fifth round of the 2023 XFL Supplemental Draft. At the completion of the season for the BattleHawks, Butler made 51 receptions for 599 yards and eight touchdowns. He was released from his contract on May 15.

=== Pittsburgh Steelers ===
On May 16, 2023, Butler signed with the Pittsburgh Steelers. He was waived/injured on August 21, and then reverted to injured reserve. Butler was released by the Steelers on August 25.

=== St. Louis Battlehawks (second stint) ===
On December 4, 2023, Butler re-signed with the Battlehawks. He was named to the 2024 All-UFL team on June 5, 2024. On June 7, Butler was named the UFL Offensive Player of the Year. Butler finished the season with 652 receiving yards, 45 receptions, and five touchdowns.

=== Cincinnati Bengals ===
On July 26, 2024, Butler signed with the Cincinnati Bengals. On August 23, Butler was released by the Bengals.

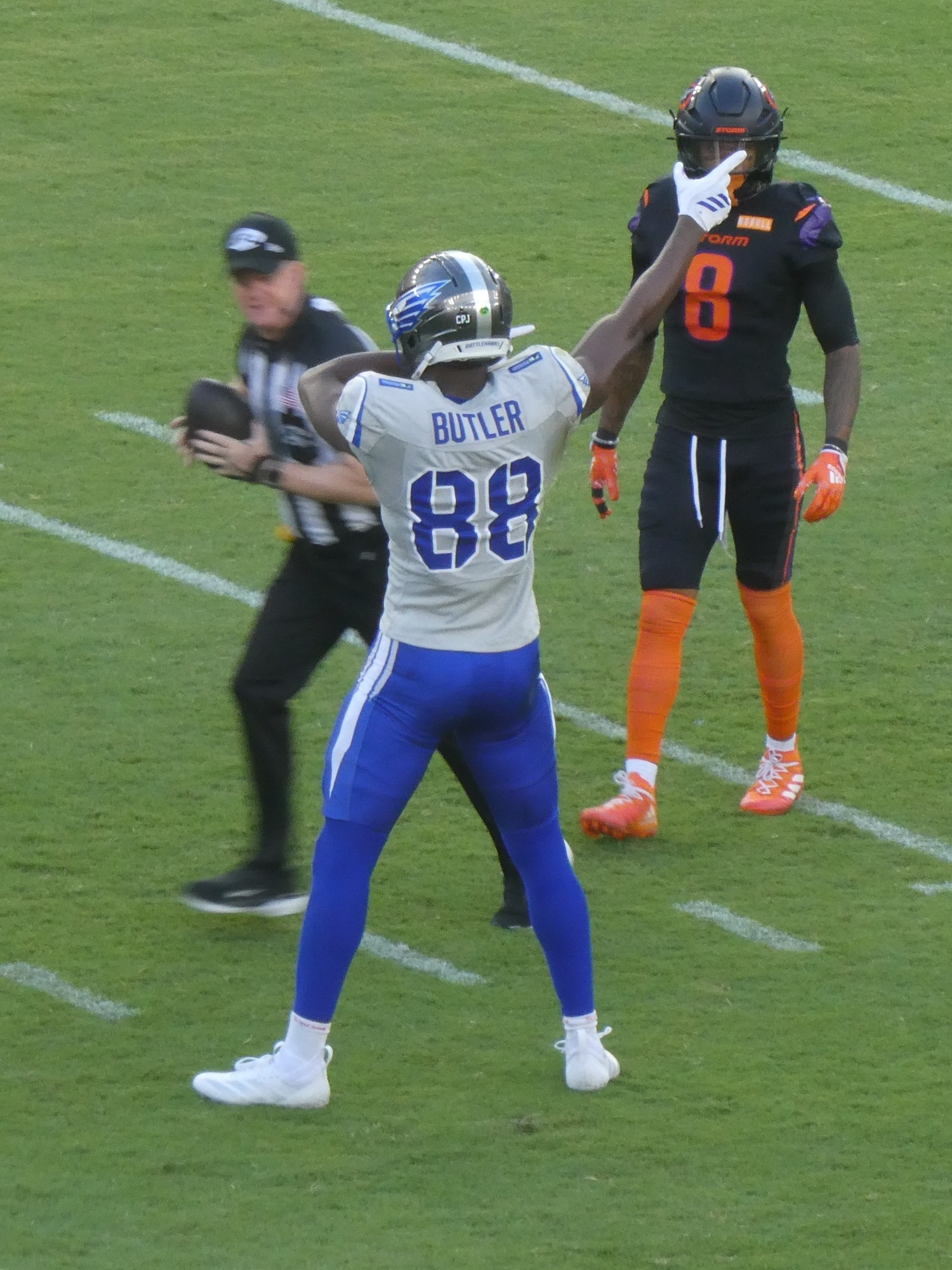
Butler in 2026

=== St. Louis Battlehawks (third stint) ===
On January 2, 2025, Butler re-signed with the Battlehawks.

On January 13, 2026, Butler re-signed with the Battlehawks via the 2026 draft reserve list. In nine appearances for St. Louis, he recorded 641 yards and three touchdowns, falling just 29 yards short of the record (670 yards) set by Jahcour Pearson in 2023. On June 10, Butler was named as the UFL Offensive Player of the Year, winning the award for the second time in his career.

=== Denver Broncos ===
On June 15, 2026, Butler signed with the Denver Broncos. On August 25, Butler was waived by the Broncos.

== Career statistics ==
=== NFL ===
==== Regular season ====
| Year | Team | Games | | Receiving | | | | |
| Year | Team | GP | GS | Rec | Yds | Avg | Lng | TD |
|---|---|---|---|---|---|---|---|---|
| 2020 | PHI | 2 | 0 | — | — | — | — | — |
| Career | | 2 | 0 | 0 | 0 | 0.0 | 0 | 0 |

=== CFL ===
==== Regular season ====
| Year | Team | Games | | Receiving | | | | |
| Year | Team | GP | GS | Rec | Yds | Avg | Lng | TD |
|---|---|---|---|---|---|---|---|---|
| 2022 | EDM | 1 | 1 | 1 | 5 | 5.0 | 5 | 0 |
| Career | | 1 | 1 | 1 | 5 | 5.0 | 5 | 0 |

=== XFL/UFL ===
Legend
| | Offensive Player of the Year |
| | Led the league |
| **Bold** | Career high |

==== Regular season ====
| Year | Team | League | Games | | Receiving | | | | |
| Year | Team | League | GP | GS | Rec | Yds | Avg | Lng | TD |
|---|---|---|---|---|---|---|---|---|---|
| 2023 | STL | XFL | **10** | 7 | **51** | 599 | 11.7 | 66 | **8** |
| 2024 | STL | UFL | **10** | **10** | 45 | **652** | 14.5 | **80** | 5 |
| 2025 | STL | UFL | 7 | 7 | 13 | 300 | **23.1** | 67 | 4 |
| 2026 | STL | UFL | 9 | 9 | 29 | 641 | 22.1 | 75 | 3 |
| Career | | | 36 | 33 | 138 | 2,192 | 15.9 | 80 | 20 |

==== Postseason ====
| Year | Team | League | Games | | Receiving | | | | |
| Year | Team | League | GP | GS | Rec | Yds | Avg | Lng | TD |
|---|---|---|---|---|---|---|---|---|---|
| 2024 | STL | UFL | 1 | 1 | **6** | **59** | **9.8** | **28** | 0 |
| 2025 | STL | UFL | 1 | 1 | 2 | 19 | 9.5 | 12 | 1 |
| 2026 | STL | UFL | 1 | 1 | 3 | 24 | 8.0 | 16 | 0 |
| Career | | | 3 | 3 | 11 | 102 | 9.3 | 28 | 1 |

=== College ===
| Season | Team | Games | | Receiving | | | |
| Season | Team | GP | GS | Rec | Yds | Avg | TD |
|---|---|---|---|---|---|---|---|
| 2015 | Iowa State | 0 | 0 | Redshirt | | | |
| 2016 | Iowa State | 11 | 1 | 9 | 134 | 14.9 | 2 |
| 2017 | Iowa State | 12 | 5 | 41 | 697 | 17.0 | 7 |
| 2018 | Iowa State | 13 | 13 | 60 | 1,318 | 22.0 | 9 |
| Career | | 36 | 19 | 110 | 2,149 | 19.5 | 18 |
