= LaCale London =

American football player (born 1997)

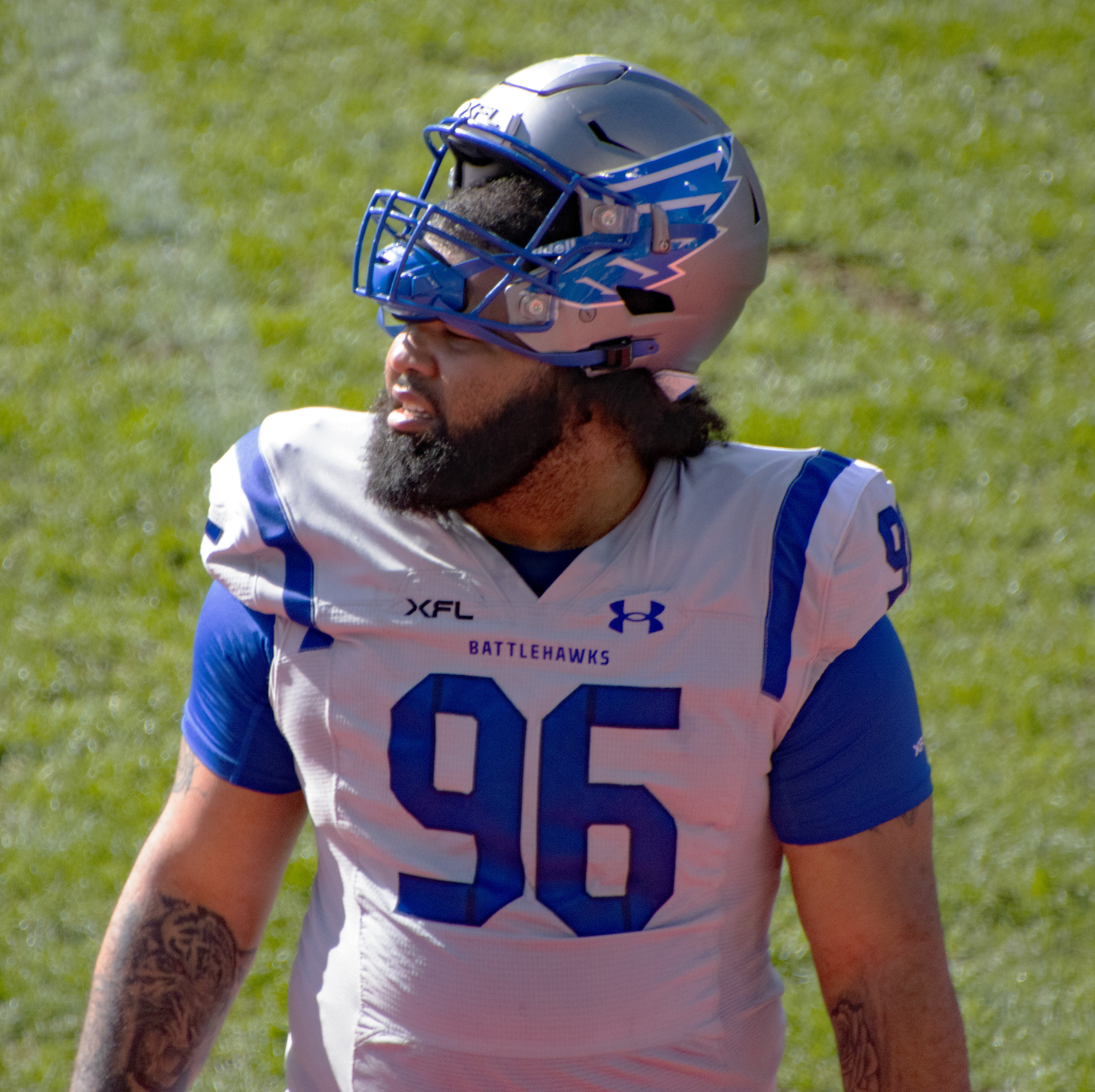
- London with the St. Louis BattleHawks in 2023

No. 94 – Atlanta Falcons
- Position: Defensive tackle
- Roster status: Active

Personal information
- Born: August 5, 1997 (age 29); Peoria, Illinois, U.S.
- Listed height: 6 ft 3 in (1.91 m)
- Listed weight: 297 lb (135 kg)

Career information
- High school: Peoria
- College: Iowa Central CC (2016); Western Illinois (2018–2019)
- NFL draft: 2020: undrafted

Career history
- Chicago Bears (2020–2022); St. Louis BattleHawks (2023); Atlanta Falcons (2023–present)

Career NFL statistics as of Week 5, 2026
- Total tackles: 58
- Sacks: 5
- Forced fumbles: 1
- Fumble recoveries: 1
- Pass deflections: 1
- Stats at Pro Football Reference

LaCale London (born August 5, 1997) is an American professional football defensive tackle for the Atlanta Falcons of the National Football League (NFL). He played college football for the Western Illinois Leathernecks and was signed by the Chicago Bears as an undrafted free agent in 2020.

== Early life ==
LaCale London was born on August 5, 1997, in Peoria, Illinois. He attended Peoria High School there, earning all-conference and defensive player of the year honors. After graduating, London spent one year at Iowa Central Community College, playing in six games as a freshman and recording 32 tackles. He also made six quarterback sacks.

== College career ==
London later transferred to Western Illinois University, playing in all eleven games in 2018. He recorded 23 tackles and 3.5 sacks, earning him a place on the Missouri Valley Football Conference (MVCF) All-Newcomer team. As a senior in 2019, London started all twelve games and tied for second in the MVCF with three forced fumbles. He totaled 45 tackles, earning him second-team All-MVCF honors by Phil Steele.

== Professional career ==
Pre-draft measurables
Height	Weight	Arm length	Hand span	Wingspan	40-yard dash	10-yard split	20-yard split	20-yard shuttle	Vertical jump	Broad jump	Bench press
6 ft 3 5/8 in (1.92 m)	297 lb (135 kg)	32 1/2 in (0.83 m)	9 3/8 in (0.24 m)	6 ft 6 1/4 in (1.99 m)	5.16 s	1.71 s	2.72 s	4.85 s	34.0 in (0.86 m)	9 ft 4 in (2.84 m)	25 reps
All values from Pro Day

=== Chicago Bears ===
After going unselected in the 2020 NFL draft, London was signed by the Chicago Bears as an undrafted free agent. He was released at roster cuts but later re-signed to the practice squad. He spent the entire 2020 season on the practice squad, and did not see any playing time.

London was placed on injured reserve to start the 2021 season, but was released with an injury settlement on September 8. He was re-signed to the practice squad on November 2, and activated in December. He made his NFL debut on December 20, playing on one snap in a loss versus the Minnesota Vikings. He signed a reserve/future contract with the Bears on January 11, 2022. He was waived on August 23, 2022.

=== St. Louis BattleHawks ===
On November 17, 2022, London was selected by the St. Louis BattleHawks of the XFL. After posting two forced fumbles in a win over the Seattle Sea Dragons, he was named the XFL Defensive Player of the Week. He was released from his contract on May 15, 2023.

=== Atlanta Falcons ===
On May 16, 2023, London signed with the Atlanta Falcons. He was waived on August 29, and was re-signed to the team's practice squad. On October 24, the Falcons signed London to the active roster. He was placed on injured reserve on November 1. He was activated on December 16.

London was waived by the Falcons on August 27, 2024, and re-signed to the practice squad. He signed a reserve/future contract with Atlanta on January 17, 2025.

On March 12, 2026, London re-signed with the Falcons.
