= Anthony Becht =

American football player and coach (born 1977)

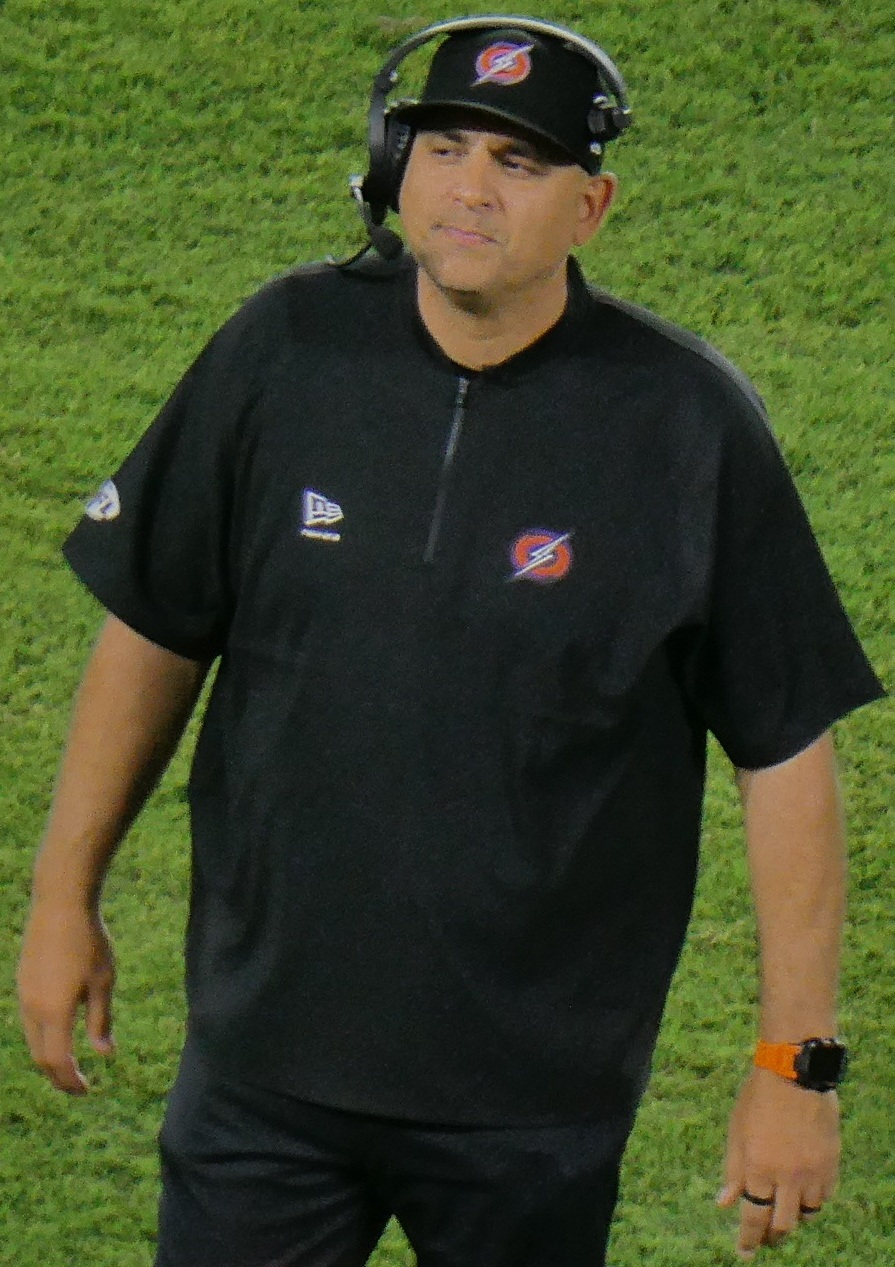
- Becht with the Orlando Storm in 2026

Orlando Storm
- Title: Head coach

Personal information
- Born: August 8, 1977 (age 49); Drexel Hill, Pennsylvania, U.S.
- Listed height: 6 ft 6 in (1.98 m)
- Listed weight: 270 lb (122 kg)

Career information
- Position: Tight end (No. 88, 87, 84)
- High school: Monsignor Bonner (Drexel Hill)
- College: West Virginia (1995–1999)
- NFL draft: 2000: 1st round, 27th overall pick

Career history

Playing
- New York Jets (2000–2004); Tampa Bay Buccaneers (2005–2007); St. Louis Rams (2008); Arizona Cardinals (2009); Kansas City Chiefs (2011)

Coaching
- San Diego Fleet (2019) Tight ends coach; St. Louis Battlehawks (2023–2025) Head coach; Orlando Storm (2026–present) Head coach

Awards and highlights
- As a player: PFWA All-Rookie Team (2000); 2× Second-team All-Big East (1998–1999); As a coach: UFL Coach of the Year (2026)

Career NFL statistics
- Receptions: 188
- Receiving yards: 1,537
- Receiving touchdowns: 21
- Stats at Pro Football Reference

Head coaching record
- Regular season: 30–10 (.750)
- Postseason: 0–3 (.000)
- Career: 30–13 (.698)

Anthony G. Becht (/bɛkt/ BEKT; born August 8, 1977) is an American professional football coach, broadcaster and former player who is the head coach of the Orlando Storm of the United Football League (UFL) and color commentator for the New York Jets of the National Football League (NFL). He played as a tight end in the NFL for 11 seasons.

Becht played college football for the West Virginia Mountaineers and was selected by the Jets in the first round of the 2000 NFL draft with the 27th overall pick. He was also a member of the Tampa Bay Buccaneers, St. Louis Rams, Arizona Cardinals, and Kansas City Chiefs.

Becht was hired by ESPN as a college football analyst in 2013. He worked as an analyst for some Sunday Night Football games on Westwood One in 2021, and signed on as the Jets' color commentator for the 2024 season.

In 2019, he was the tight ends coach of the San Diego Fleet of the Alliance of American Football. From 2023 to 2025, he was the head coach of the St. Louis Battlehawks, initially of the XFL and then of the UFL.

== Personal life ==
Becht, a graduate of Monsignor Bonner High School in Drexel Hill, Pennsylvania, was 6'5" and 205 pounds coming out of high school. Becht was an all-city, all-Catholic conference and all-county selection as a senior after recording 47 receptions for 693 yards. Becht accepted a football scholarship from West Virginia.

Becht's son, Rocco Becht, currently plays quarterback for Penn State after playing three seasons for Iowa State.

== College career ==
At the end of Becht's college career, he ranked second among tight ends at the school with 83 catches for 1,173 yards, a 14.1 average of yards per catch, and 10 touchdowns. Becht was an honorable mention for All-American as a senior and was named second-team All-Big East as a junior and senior, along with being team captain and MVP. He graduated with a bachelor's degree in marketing.

== Professional career ==
Pre-draft measurables
Height	Weight	Arm length	Hand span	40-yard dash	20-yard shuttle	Three-cone drill	Vertical jump	Broad jump
6 ft 5 5/8 in (1.97 m)	270 lb (122 kg)	32 5/8 in (0.83 m)	10 1/2 in (0.27 m)	4.69 s	4.08 s	6.94 s	33.5 in (0.85 m)	10 ft 3 in (3.12 m)
All values from NFL Combine

=== New York Jets ===
Becht was selected by the Jets with a traded draft pick from Tampa Bay. As a rookie in 2000 for the Jets, Becht played in 14 games, missing two due to an ankle sprain. He was a starter for 10 games and totaled 16 receptions for 144 yards and two touchdowns on the season. Becht ranked third among the rookie tight ends with receptions, behind Green Bay 's Bubba Franks and Cleveland's Aaron Shea.

In 2001, Becht started all 16 games and recorded 36 receptions for 321 yards and five touchdowns. He tied former Jets' tight end Kyle Brady for the most receptions by an AFC tight end. His five scores were only beat by Colts' Marcus Pollard and Chiefs' Tony Gonzalez. Becht recorded consecutive game-winning touchdown catches in weeks 13 and 14.

In 2002, Becht once again started all 16 games and tallied 28 receptions, 243 yards, and a career-high tying five scores. Becht caught one pass for eight yards and served as a key blocker in the 41–0 win over the Colts in the AFC Wild Card playoff game and recorded three receptions for 14 yards in the AFC Divisional Playoff loss at Oakland.

In 2003, Becht set career-highs of 40 receptions for 356 yards and he included four TD catches while starting all sixteen games once again. Becht caught a career-best six passes, including a one-yard touchdown, and gained 32 yards at Miami in the season finale.

As his final season as a Jet in 2004, Becht had a career-low 13 receptions, for also lows of 100 yards and only 1 touchdown. He did manage to catch a touchdown pass in the Jets Wild Card win over the San Diego Chargers. In New York City, Becht totaled 1,146 yards receiving with 17 touchdowns off of 133 receptions.

=== Tampa Bay Buccaneers ===
In his first year in Tampa Bay in 2005, Becht recorded 16 receptions, much like his rookie year, 112 yards but no touchdowns as his career began to slide downward. Becht competed with rookie Alex Smith for the tight end spot, who the Bucs picked up in the 2005 NFL draft.

In 2006, Becht saw himself being replaced by the rookie, Smith. Still, Becht grabbed 18 receptions for 115 yards and a score, from mainly rookie Bruce Gradkowski.

In 2007, Becht's productivity decreased even more. He finished the season with only 5 receptions for 201 yards and 2 touchdowns.

=== St. Louis Rams ===
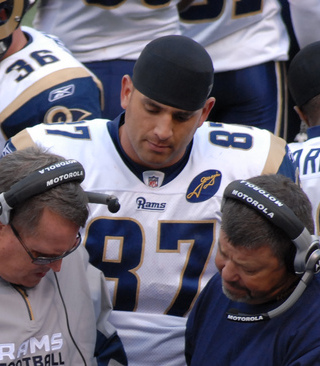
Becht with the St. Louis Rams in 2008

On March 6, 2008, he signed with the St. Louis Rams. Becht joined fellow-former Mountaineers Marc Magro and Marc Bulger on the Rams squad. Becht played one season with the team before his release on March 12, 2009.

=== Arizona Cardinals ===
Becht signed with the Arizona Cardinals on March 19, 2009. In 2009, Becht had 61 yards on 10 catches, averaging 6.1 yards per catch. He also had one receiving touchdown. On September 3, 2010, Becht was released as part of final cuts for the 2010 NFL season.

=== Kansas City Chiefs ===
Becht signed with the Kansas City Chiefs on August 25, 2011, but was released on September 5. The Chiefs re-signed him on September 16. Becht was released by the Chiefs again, so there could be room for tight end Jake O'Connell. On October 26, he was signed once again, by the Chiefs. On December 18, 2011, Becht had 2 catches for 20 yards.

== NFL statistics ==
=== Regular season ===
Year	Team	GP	Receiving						Fumbles	
Year	Team	GP	Rec	Yds	Avg	Lng	TD	FD	Fum	Lost
2000	NYJ	14	16	144	9.0	30	2	9	0	0
2001	NYJ	16	36	321	8.9	24	5	19	0	0
2002	NYJ	16	28	243	8.7	21	5	19	0	0
2003	NYJ	16	40	356	8.9	29	4	26	1	0
2004	NYJ	16	13	100	7.7	19	1	8	0	0
2005	TB	16	16	112	7.0	17	0	3	0	0
2006	TB	16	18	115	6.4	13	1	4	1	0
2007	TB	16	5	20	4.0	9	2	2	0	0
2008	STL	16	6	39	6.5	11	0	1	0	0
2009	ARI	16	7	61	8.7	16	1	4	1	1
2011	KC	9	3	26	8.7	16	0	2	0	0
Career		167	188	1,537	8.2	30	21	97	3	1

=== Postseason ===
Year	Team	GP	Receiving						Fumbles	
Year	Team	GP	Rec	Yds	Avg	Lng	TD	FD	Fum	Lost
2002	NYJ	2	4	22	5.5	8	0	0	0	0
2004	NYJ	2	3	28	9.3	13	1	2	0	0
2005	TB	1	3	26	8.7	14	0	2	0	0
2007	TB	1	0	0	0.0	0	0	0	0	0
2009	ARI	2	1	8	8.0	8	0	0	0	0
Career		8	11	84	7.6	14	1	4	0	0

== Coaching career ==
On April 13, 2022, it was announced that Becht would serve as the head coach of the St. Louis BattleHawks of the XFL in 2023. Becht's broadcasting role with the Jets will not interfere with his coaching career, as the UFL operates on a seasonal employment schedule in which coaches are only employed during the UFL season; he returned to the Battlehawks in 2025.

On December 23, 2025, Becht was named the head coach of the Orlando Storm, a newly established UFL team. The reassignment allows Becht to spend more time at his home in central Florida and accounts for the league's plans to dissolve all of the league's rosters; Becht is one of only two coaches who started the 2025 season to remain a UFL coach in 2026 (Shannon Harris, who took over the DC Defenders immediately before the season and will remain coach of that team, is the other), as most of the others resigned, retired or were forced out.

== Broadcasting career ==
Becht was a long-time co-host of the "Football Fan Shop" on the Home Shopping Network.

In 2024, Becht was named as the color commentator/analyst for the New York Jets Radio Network, replacing Marty Lyons.

== Head coaching record ==
=== XFL/UFL ===
League	Team	Year	Regular season				Postseason			
League	Team	Year	Won	Lost	Win %	Finish	Won	Lost	Win %	Result
XFL	STL	2023	7	3	.700	3rd in North Division	—	—	—	—
UFL	STL	2024	7	3	.700	1st in XFL Conference	0	1	.000	Lost to San Antonio Brahmas in XFL Conference Championship Game
UFL	STL	2025	8	2	.800	1st in XFL Conference	0	1	.000	Lost to DC Defenders in XFL Conference Championship Game
UFL	STL total		22	8	.733		0	2	.000	
UFL	ORL	2026	8	2	.800	1st in UFL League	0	1	.000	Lost to DC Defenders in UFL Semifinals
Total			30	10	.750		0	3	.000	
