= Chris Garrett (linebacker) =

American football player (born 1998)

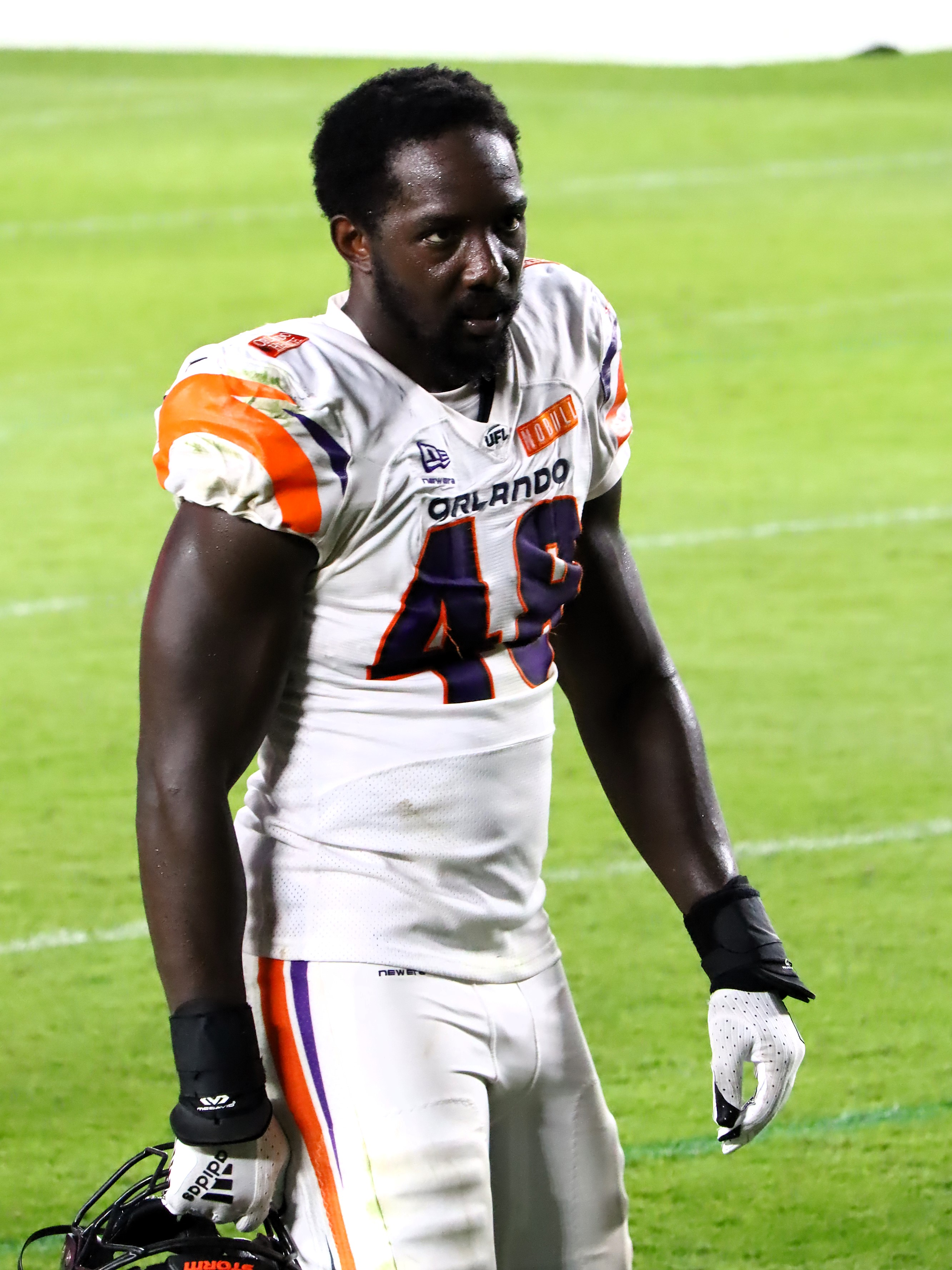
- Garrett with the Orlando Storm in 2026

No. 48 – Orlando Storm
- Position: Linebacker
- Roster status: Active

Personal information
- Born: June 12, 1998 (age 28); Milwaukee, Wisconsin, U.S.
- Listed height: 6 ft 4 in (1.93 m)
- Listed weight: 239 lb (108 kg)

Career information
- High school: Wisconsin Lutheran (Milwaukee)
- College: Concordia–St. Paul (2017–2020)
- NFL draft: 2021: 7th round, 252nd overall pick

Career history
- Los Angeles Rams (2021); Minnesota Vikings (2022)*; Seattle Seahawks (2022–2023)*; Houston Gamblers (2023); St. Louis Battlehawks (2024); Arizona Cardinals (2024)*; St. Louis Battlehawks (2025); Orlando Storm (2026–present)
- * Offseason or practice squad member only

Awards and highlights
- Super Bowl champion (LVI); UFL Special Teams Player of the Year (2024); NSIC Defensive Player of the Year (2019); 2× First-team All-NSIC (2018, 2019); NCAA Division II record: Most career forced fumbles: 15

Career NFL statistics as of 2025
- Games played: 1
- Stats at Pro Football Reference

Chris Garrett (born June 12, 1998) is an American professional football player who is a linebacker for the Orlando Storm of the United Football League (UFL). He played college football for the Concordia Golden Bears and was selected by the Los Angeles Rams of the National Football League (NFL) in the seventh round of the 2021 NFL draft.

== Professional career ==
Pre-draft measurables
Height	Weight	Arm length	Hand span	Wingspan	40-yard dash	10-yard split	20-yard split	20-yard shuttle	Three-cone drill	Vertical jump	Broad jump	Bench press
6 ft 3 1/2 in (1.92 m)	241 lb (109 kg)	33 1/8 in (0.84 m)	9 5/8 in (0.24 m)	6 ft 6 1/2 in (1.99 m)	4.81 s	1.57 s	2.63 s	4.31 s	7.07 s	30.0 in (0.76 m)	9 ft 6 in (2.90 m)	11 reps
All values from Pro Day

=== Los Angeles Rams ===
Garrett was selected by the Los Angeles Rams in the seventh round, 252nd overall, of the 2021 NFL draft. On May 16, 2021, Garrett signed his four-year rookie contract with Los Angeles. Garrett won his first Super Bowl ring when the Rams defeated the Cincinnati Bengals in Super Bowl LVI. Garrett played in one NFL regular season game.

On August 30, 2022, Garrett was waived by the Rams as part of final roster cuts.

=== Minnesota Vikings ===
On September 14, 2022, Garrett signed with the practice squad of the Minnesota Vikings. He was released on January 3, 2023.

=== Seattle Seahawks ===
On January 10, 2023, Garrett was signed to the Seattle Seahawks practice squad. He signed a reserve/future contract on January 17, 2023. He was waived on May 22, 2023.

=== Houston Gamblers ===
Garrett signed with the Houston Gamblers of the United States Football League on June 6, 2023. Garrett and all other Gamblers players and coaches were all transferred to the Houston Roughnecks after it was announced that the Gamblers took on the identity of their XFL counterpart, the Roughnecks.

=== St. Louis Battlehawks (first stint) ===
On January 15, 2024, Garrett was selected by the St. Louis Battlehawks in the second round of the Super Draft portion of the 2024 UFL dispersal draft. He was waived on March 22, 2024. He was re-signed on April 2, 2024. He was named the 2024 UFL Special Teams Player of the Year on June 7, 2024. His contract was terminated on August 19, 2024, to sign with an NFL team.

=== Arizona Cardinals ===
On August 20, 2024, Garrett was signed by the Arizona Cardinals, but waived six days later.

=== St. Louis Battlehawks (second stint) ===
On October 31, 2024, Garrett re-signed with the Battlehawks. He was placed on injured reserve on June 2, 2025.

=== Orlando Storm ===
On January 13, 2026, Garrett was selected by the Orlando Storm in the 2026 UFL Draft.
