= Darrius Shepherd =

American football player (born 1995)

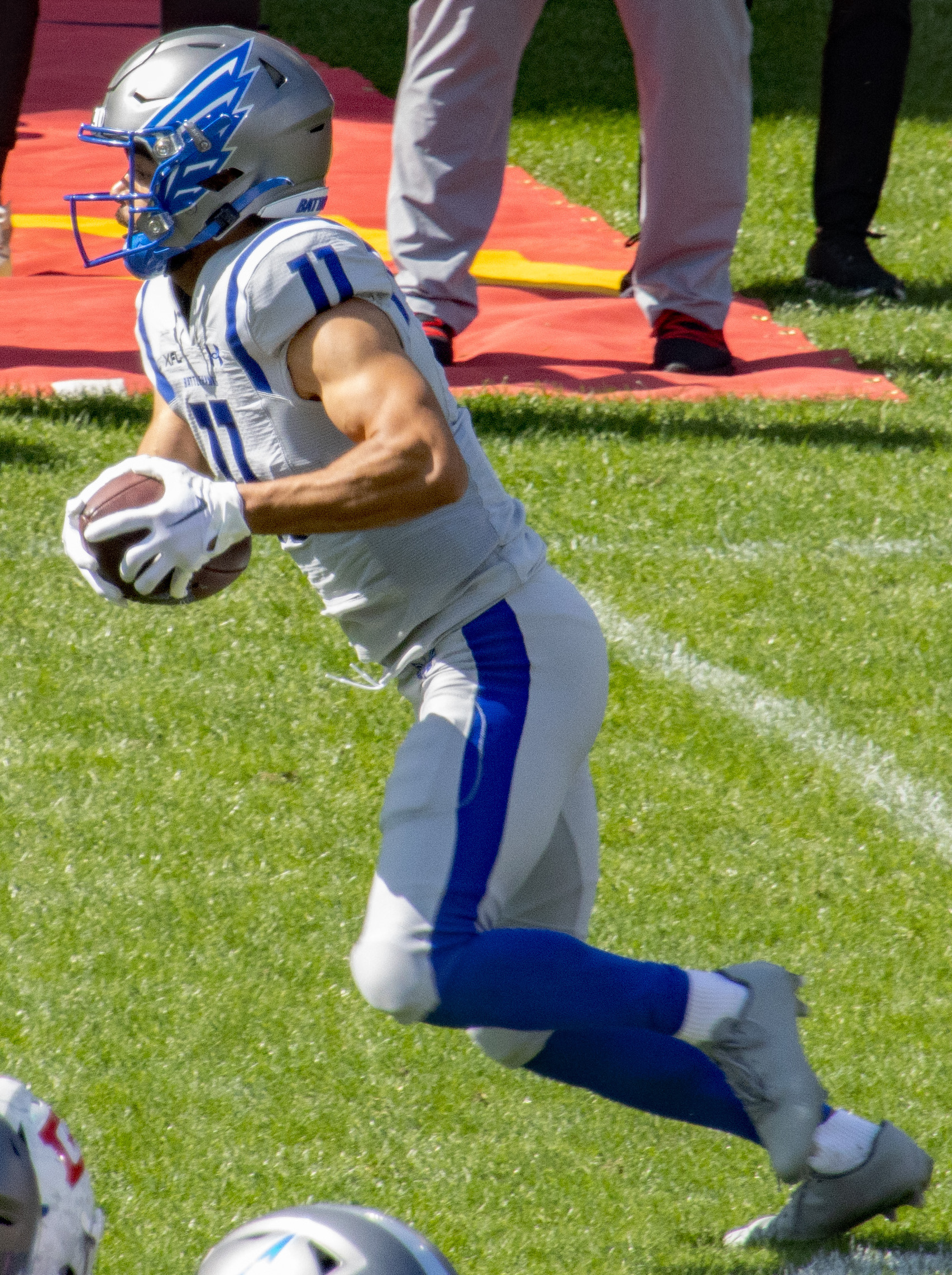
- Shepherd with the St. Louis BattleHawks in 2023

No. 11
- Position: Wide receiver

Personal information
- Born: November 1, 1995 (age 31); Kansas City, Missouri, U.S.
- Listed height: 5 ft 11 in (1.80 m)
- Listed weight: 186 lb (84 kg)

Career information
- High school: Blue Springs (Blue Springs, Missouri)
- College: North Dakota State
- NFL draft: 2019: undrafted

Career history
- Green Bay Packers (2019–2020); Kansas City Chiefs (2021)*; Arizona Cardinals (2021)*; Minnesota Vikings (2021)*; Pittsburgh Steelers (2021)*; New Jersey Generals (2022); Denver Broncos (2022)*; St. Louis BattleHawks (2023); Los Angeles Chargers (2023)*; St. Louis BattleHawks (2024)
- * Offseason or practice squad member only

Awards and highlights
- XFL Special Teams Player of the Year (2023); All-XFL Team (2023); XFL kickoff return yards leader (2023); 3× FCS national champion (2015, 2017, 2018); NCAA Division I Championship Game Most Outstanding Player (2019); Third-team STATS FCS All-America (2018, PR); First-team All-MVFC (2018, WR and RS)

Career NFL statistics
- Receptions: 6
- Receiving yards: 47
- Stats at Pro Football Reference

Darrius Allen Shepherd (born November 1, 1995) is an American former professional football player who was a wide receiver in the National Football League (NFL). He played college football for the North Dakota State Bison, and was signed by the Green Bay Packers as an undrafted free agent in 2020.

== Early life ==
Shepherd was born one of three children to Amy Shepherd. His brother is named Xavier and his sister is named Cheyenne. Shepherd's father Louis, played college football for Missouri and his grandfather played college basketball for Missouri State and was selected by the Los Angeles Lakers in 1968.

== High school career ==
Shepherd attended Blue Springs High School in Blue Springs, Missouri. Shepherd committed to North Dakota State over an offer from Valparaiso.

== College career ==
Shepherd finished his college career with the Bison recording 188 receptions for 2,841 yards and 20 touchdowns. Shepherd graduated in May 2018 from North Dakota State with a bachelor's degree in university studies while minoring in psychology.

== Professional career ==
Pre-draft measurables
Height	Weight	Arm length	Hand span	40-yard dash	10-yard split	20-yard split	20-yard shuttle	Three-cone drill	Vertical jump	Broad jump	Bench press
5 ft 10 1/2 in (1.79 m)	186 lb (84 kg)	30 in (0.76 m)	10 in (0.25 m)	4.61 s	1.68 s	2.68 s	4.40 s	7.13 s	35.5 in (0.90 m)	10 ft 0 in (3.05 m)	14 reps
All values from Pro Day

=== Green Bay Packers ===
On May 6, 2019, Shepherd was signed by the Green Bay Packers after being invited to rookie camp. He recorded his first NFL catch, a 1-yard reception from Aaron Rodgers, during a Week 6 win over the Detroit Lions on October 14, 2019. He was waived on October 29 and re-signed to the practice squad. He signed a reserve/future contract with the Packers on January 21, 2020.

Shepherd was waived on September 5, 2020, and signed to the practice squad the next day. He was promoted to the active roster on September 26, 2020. He was waived on December 1, 2020.

=== Kansas City Chiefs ===
On June 17, 2021, Shepherd signed with the Kansas City Chiefs. He was released on August 31, 2021.

=== Arizona Cardinals ===
On November 10, 2021, Shepherd was signed to the Arizona Cardinals practice squad. He was released on November 15, 2021.

=== Minnesota Vikings ===
On December 15, 2021, Shepherd was signed to the Minnesota Vikings practice squad. He was released on December 21, 2021.

=== Pittsburgh Steelers ===
On December 30, 2021, Shepherd was signed to the Pittsburgh Steelers practice squad. He was released on January 3, 2022.

=== New Jersey Generals ===
On February 23, 2022, Shepherd was drafted by the New Jersey Generals.

=== Denver Broncos ===
On August 4, 2022, Shepherd signed with the Denver Broncos. He was waived on August 30, 2022, and signed to the practice squad the next day. He was released on October 11.

=== St. Louis Battlehawks ===
Shepherd was drafted by the St. Louis Battlehawks on November 18, 2022. Shepherd started 8 games, catching 36 Passes for 363 Yards, and 4 Touchdowns. Shepherd also returned 27 Kicks for 701 Yards, with his longest return being 80 Yards. Shepherd won the 2023 XFL Special Teams Player of the Year on May 3, 2023. He was released from his contract on June 1.

=== Los Angeles Chargers ===
On June 1, 2023, Shepherd signed with the Los Angeles Chargers. He was released on August 29, 2023.

=== St. Louis Battlehawks (second stint) ===
On January 19, 2024, Shepherd re-signed with the St. Louis Battlehawks.

Shepherd retired.

=== Career statistics ===
Spring leagues statistics
Year	Team	League	Games		Receiving					Rushing				Kickoff returns				
Year	Team	League	GP	GS	Rec	Yds	Avg	TD	LG	Att	Yds	Avg	TD	Num	Yds	Avg	TD	LG
2019	GB	NFL	6	0	1	1	1.0	0	1	0	0	0	0	9	147	16.3	0	21
2020	GB	NFL	8	0	5	46	9.2	0	19	0	0	0	0	11	227	20.6	0	30
2022	NJ	USFL	8	6	27	323	12.0	1	35	0	0	0	0	0	0	0.0	0	0
2023	STL	XFL	8	8	36	363	10.1	4	30T	0	0	0	0	27	701	26.0	0	80
