= St. Louis Battlehawks =

UFL (2024) team based in St. Louis, Missouri

- Current season
| Logo | Wordmark |
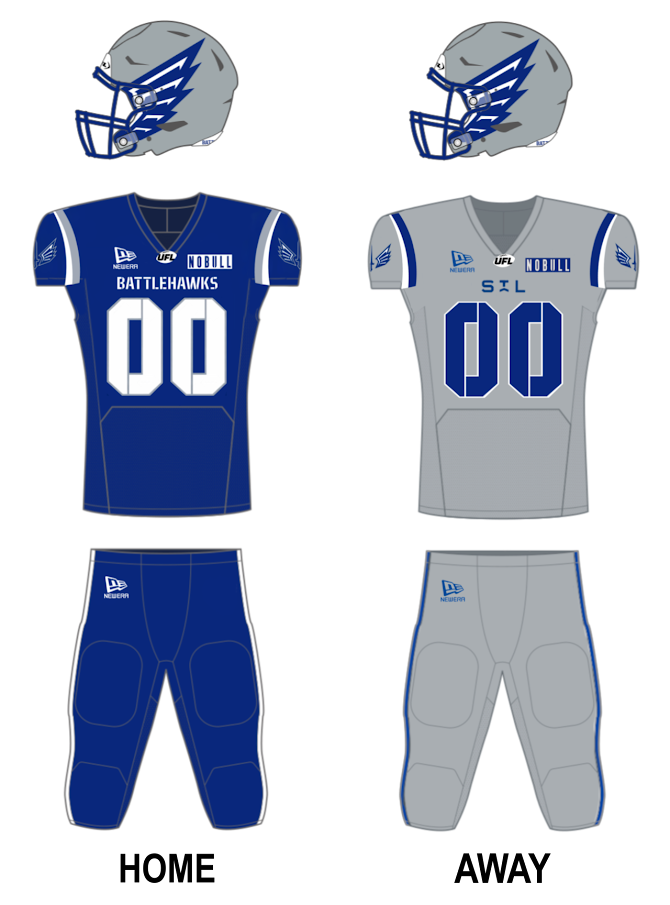
- Uniforms

General information
- Founded: December 5, 2018; 7 years ago
- Stadium: The Dome at America's Center; St. Louis, Missouri
- Colors: Royal blue, silver
- Mascot: Archie B
- Website: www.theufl.com/teams/st-louis

Personnel
- Owner: League owned
- Head coach: Ricky Proehl

Team history
- St. Louis BattleHawks (2020–2023); St. Louis Battlehawks (2024–present)

Home fields
- The Dome at America's Center (2020, 2023–present)

League / conference affiliations
- XFL (2020–2023): East Division (2020); North Division (2023); United Football League (2024–present): XFL Conference (2024–2025)

Championships
- Division championships: 2: XFL: 2024, 2025

Playoff appearances (3)
- UFL: 2024, 2025, 2026

The St. Louis Battlehawks (Note: Stylized as St. Louis BattleHawks prior to 2023) are a professional American football team based in St. Louis. The Battlehawks compete in the United Football League (UFL). The team was a founding member of the XFL. The Battlehawks were founded by Vince McMahon’s Alpha Entertainment and is owned and operated by a consortium led by Mike Repole. The Battlehawks play their home games at The Dome at America's Center. The team has a franchise regular season record of 31–14 as of the 2026 season.

== History ==
=== McMahon era (2020) ===
On December 5, 2018, St. Louis was announced as one of eight cities that would join the newly reformed XFL, as well as Seattle, Houston, Los Angeles, New York, DC, Tampa Bay, and Dallas. On April 18, 2019, the team hired Jonathan Hayes, who most recently was tight ends coach for the Cincinnati Bengals, as their first head coach. Hayes is an alumnus of the University of Iowa. The team name and logo were revealed on August 21, 2019, as well as the team’s uniforms on December 3, 2019.

On October 15, 2019, The Battlehawks announced their first player in team history, being assigned former Ole Miss Rebels quarterback Jordan Ta'amu.

The Battlehawks won their first game in team history on February 8, 2020, defeating the Dallas Renegades 15–9. On March 12, 2020, The XFL announced that the remainder of the 2020 XFL season had been cancelled due to the COVID-19 pandemic. The team finished with a 3–2 record. On April 10, 2020, The XFL suspended operations, with all employees, players and staff terminated.

=== Johnson and Garcia era (2023–present) ===
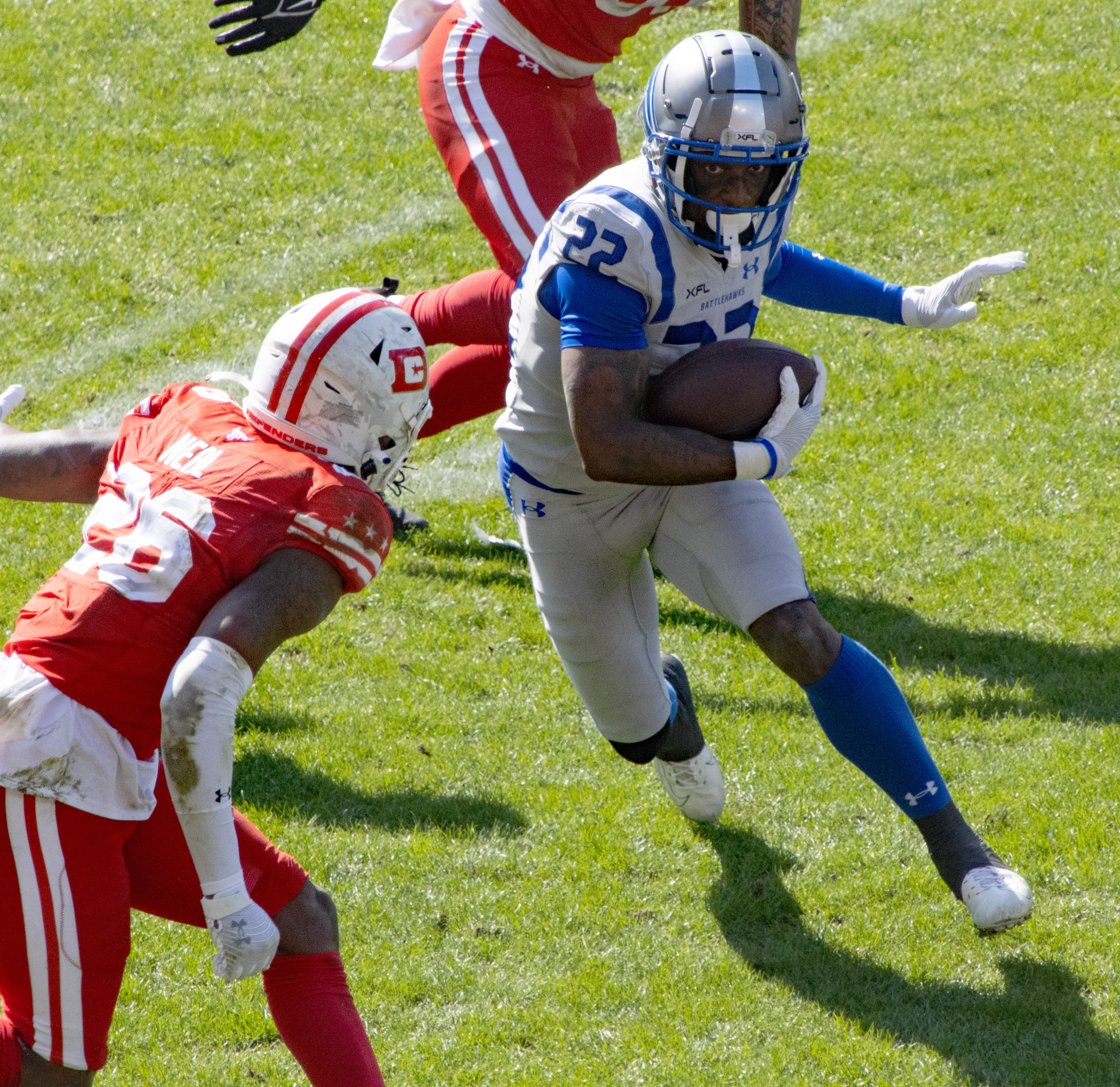
Steven Mitchell carries the ball for the Battlehawks during a 2023 game against the DC Defenders

On August 3, 2020, it was reported that a consortium led by Dwayne "The Rock" Johnson, Dany Garcia, and Gerry Cardinale (through Cardinale's fund RedBird Capital Partners) purchased the XFL for $15 million just hours before an auction could take place; the purchase received court approval on August 7, 2020. The XFL hired Anthony Becht as a Head Coach on April 13, 2022, with the expectation that he would be coaching the St. Louis team. On July 24, 2022, the return of a St. Louis XFL franchise was confirmed, as well as the hiring of Anthony Becht. On October 31, 2022, the XFL officially announced that the Battlehawks name would be returning, with the logo having slight alterations.

The Battlehawks finished tied for second place in their division in the 2023 regular season with the Seattle Sea Dragons with a 7–3 record. The Sea Dragons were granted the playoff position after several rounds of tiebreakers (and the lack of any wild card, at-large or crossover process, which ensured the eventual champion Arlington Renegades, three games behind St. Louis in overall league standings, got into the playoffs instead). In an offseason showcase in St. Louis, league president Russ Brandon indicated that the Battlehawks would continue in St. Louis "obviously [...] for the very long haul." United States Football League president Daryl Johnston noted that St. Louis would be an ideal team to keep in a merger with the league he presided over, not only for its strong fan support (which he noted was far above and beyond any in the USFL) but because of its central location, making travel expenses affordable.

In September 2023, Axios reported that the XFL was in advanced talks with the USFL to merge the two leagues prior to the start of their 2024 seasons. On September 28, 2023, the XFL and USFL announced their intent to merge with details surrounding the merger to be announced at a later date. The merger would also require regulatory approval. In October 2023 the XFL filed a trademark application for the name "United Football League". On November 30, 2023, Garcia announced via her Instagram page that the leagues had received regulatory approval for the merger and were finalizing plans for a "combined season" to begin March 30, 2024. The merger was made official on December 31, 2023.

== Current roster ==
=== Players ===
St. Louis Battlehawks roster
| Quarterbacks (QB) Running backs (RB): 47 Rahjai Harris; 41 Jarveon Howard; 26 Kylin James; 25 Kevon Latulas; Wide receivers (WR): 3 Frank Darby; 8 Blake Jackson; 87 Steven McBride; 10 Justin Smith; 83 Thayer Thomas; Tight ends (TE): 16 James Bostic III; 80 Sal Cannella; 81 Tyler Neville | Offensive linemen (OL): 75 Javion Cohen LG; 76 Richard Gouraige LT; 61 Mike Panasiuk C; 72 Spencer Rolland RG; Defensive linemen (DL): 96 Carlos Davis DT; 56 Travis Feeney DE; 91 Demone Harris DE; 44 Steve Linton DE; 92 Neil Farrell DT; 55 Leonard Payne Jr. DT; 95 Taylor Stallworth DT; -- John Sullivan DT | Linebackers (LB): 51 LaVonta Bentley ILB; 33 Tuasivi Nomura ILB; 15 Jordan Williams ILB; Defensive backs (DB): 36 Adonis Alexander CB; 14 Nevelle Clarke CB; 21 Tayler Hawkins FS; 22 Keylon Kennedy CB; 23 Jordan Mosley SS; 6 Myles Sims CB; Special teams (ST): 20 Ramiz Ahmed K; 53 Matt Hembrough LS; 27 Ryan Sanborn P | 36 active As of November 12, 2026. Rookies in italics.: Roster |

=== Staff ===
St. Louis Battlehawks staff
| Head coach: Head coach – Ricky Proehl; Offensive coaches: Offensive coordinator – A. J. Smith; Running backs – John Estes; Wide receivers – Austin Proehl; Offensive line – Todd Washington | Defensive coaches: Defensive coordinator – Corey Chamblin; Defensive line – Jeff Zgonina; Linebackers – Will Reed; Special teams – Frank Gansz Jr. |

== Player history ==
=== Current NFL players ===
| Season | Pos | Name | NFL team |
|---|---|---|---|
| 2023 | DT | LaCale London | Atlanta Falcons |
| 2024 | K | Andre Szmyt | Cleveland Browns |
| 2024–2025 | RB | Jacob Saylors | Detroit Lions |
| 2025 | DT | Kyler Baugh | Pittsburgh Steelers |
| 2025 | CB | Nick Whiteside | Detroit Lions |
| 2026 | CB | Sean Fresch Jr. | Denver Broncos |
| 2023–2026 | WR | Gary Jennings Jr. | Los Angeles Chargers |

=== Notable players ===
| Season | Pos | Name | Notes |
|---|---|---|---|
| 2020 | RB | Matt Jones | Former Washington Redskins Running Back, 2015 3rd Round Pick |
| 2020 | RB | Christine Michael | Former Seattle Seahawks Running Back, 2013 2nd Round Pick |
| 2020 | P | Marquette King | Former Oakland Raiders Punter |
| 2023–2024 | QB | A. J. McCarron | Former Cincinnati Bengals Quarter Back, 2014 5th Round pick |
| 2024 | RB | Wayne Gallman | Former New York Giants Running Back, 2017 4th Round Pick |
| 2025 | WR | Andy Isabella | Former Arizona Cardinals Wide Receiver, 2019 2nd Round Pick |
| 2025 | WR | Denzel Mims | Former New York Jets Wide Receiver, 2020 2nd Round Pick |
| 2025 | LB | Kemoko Turay | Former Indianapolis Colts Linebacker, 2018 2nd Round Pick |
| 2025 | K | Rodrigo Blankenship | Former Georgia Bulldogs and Indianapolis Colts Kicker |

=== Offensive Player of the Year award winners ===
Battlehawks XFL/UFL OPOY winners
| Year | Player | Position | Selector |
| 2024 | Hakeem Butler | WR | UFL |
| 2026 | Hakeem Butler | WR | UFL |

=== Defensive Player of the Year award winners ===
Battlehawks XFL/UFL DPOY winners
| Year | Player | Position | Selector |
| 2025 | Pita Taumoepenu | LB | UFL |

=== Special Teams Player of the Year award winners ===
Battlehawks XFL/UFL STPOY winners
| Year | Player | Position | Selector |
| 2023 | Darrius Shepherd | WR | XFL |
| 2024 | Chris Garrett | LB | UFL |

== Coach history ==
=== Head coach history ===
| # | Name | Term | Regular season | | | | Playoffs | | | Awards |
| # | Name | Term | GC | W | L | Win % | GC | W | L | Awards |
St. Louis Battlehawks
| 1 | Jonathan Hayes | 2020 | 5 | 3 | 2 | .600 | – | – | – | |
| 2 | Anthony Becht | 2023–2025 | 30 | 22 | 8 | .733 | 2 | 0 | 2 | |
| 3 | Ricky Proehl | 2026–present | 10 | 6 | 4 | .600 | 1 | 0 | 1 | |

=== Offensive coordinator history ===
| # | Name | Term | Regular season | | | | Playoffs | | | Awards |
| # | Name | Term | GC | W | L | Win % | GC | W | L | Awards |
St. Louis Battlehawks
| 1 | Doug Meacham | 2020 | – | – | – | – | – | – | – | |
| 2 | Chuck Long | 2020 | 5 | 3 | 2 | .600 | – | – | – | |
| 3 | Bruce Gradkowski | 2023–2024 | 20 | 14 | 6 | .700 | 1 | 0 | 1 | |
| 4 | Phil McGeoghan | 2025 | 10 | 8 | 2 | .800 | 1 | 0 | 1 | |
| 5 | A. J. Smith | 2026 | 10 | 6 | 4 | .600 | 1 | 0 | 1 | |

=== Defensive coordinator history ===
| # | Name | Term | Regular season | | | | Playoffs | | | Awards |
| # | Name | Term | GC | W | L | Win % | GC | W | L | Awards |
St. Louis Battlehawks
| 1 | Jay Hayes | 2020 | 5 | 3 | 2 | .600 | – | – | – | |
| 2 | Donnie Abraham | 2023–2025 | 30 | 22 | 8 | .733 | 2 | 0 | 2 | |
| 3 | Corey Chamblin | 2026 | 10 | 6 | 4 | .600 | 1 | 0 | 1 | |

== Rivalries ==
=== DC Defenders ===
The Battlehawks have a rivalry against the DC Defenders. The Defenders have won three of the four matchups between the two teams, every game except for one has been decided by one possession and has determined who is the top team in the division at that point in the season.

At the end of their first meeting of the 2023 season, three players were ejected after a brawl broke out. A week later, the Battlehawks' quarterback, A. J. McCarron, called their competition the "first XFL rivalry."

=== Birmingham Stallions ===
With the merger of the XFL and USFL, the Battlehawks and Birmingham Stallions emerged as rivals, both because each had reached the top of their division at the time of their Week 7 meeting in the 2024 UFL season and because both of the Battlehawks' quarterbacks, Alabama alumnus McCarron and Troy alumnus Brandon Silvers, played college and high school football in the state of Alabama. The 2024 matchup between the Stallions and Battlehawks remains the highest-attended matchup in Birmingham for which attendance figures had been made public. Further adding heat to the rivalry, McCarron accepted the head coaching position with the Stallions after a somewhat acrimonious departure from St. Louis. The matchups between Birmingham and St. Louis were among the highest viewed on television of all UFL regular season contests.

=== Franchise matchup history ===
| Team | Record | Pct. |
|---|---|---|
| Birmingham Stallions | 2–1 | .667 |
| Columbus Aviators | 1–0 | 1.000 |
| Dallas Renegades | 4–4 | .500 |
| DC Defenders | 4–6 | .400 |
| Houston Gamblers | 3–1 | .750 |
| Houston Roughnecks (XFL) | 1–1 | .500 |
| Louisville Kings | 1–1 | .500 |
| Memphis Showboats | 2–0 | 1.000 |
| Michigan Panthers | 1–1 | .500 |
| Orlando Guardians | 2–0 | 1.000 |
| Orlando Storm | 1–0 | 1.000 |
| San Antonio Brahmas | 5–1 | .833 |
| Seattle Sea Dragons | 2–1 | .667 |
| Vegas Vipers | 2–0 | 1.000 |

- Defunct teams in light gray.

== Season-by-season record ==
| UFL champions^{†} (2024–present) | XFL champions^{§} (2023) | Conference champions^{*} | Division champions^{^} | Wild Card berth^{#} |

| Season | Team | League | Conference | Division | Regular season | | | Postseason results | Awards | Head coaches | Pct. |
| Season | Team | League | Conference | Division | Finish | W | L | Postseason results | Awards | Head coaches | Pct. |
|---|---|---|---|---|---|---|---|---|---|---|---|
| 2020 | 2020 | XFL | —N/a | East | 2nd | 3 | 2 | Season Suspended after 5 games due to COVID-19 | | Jonathan Hayes | .600 |
| 2021 | — | | | | | | | | | | |
| 2022 | — | | | | | | | | | | |
| 2023 | 2023 | XFL | —N/a | North | 3rd | 7 | 3 | | Darrius Shepherd (STPOY) | Anthony Becht | .733 |
| 2024 | 2024 | UFL | XFL | —N/a | 1st^{#} | 7 | 3 | Lost XFL Conference Championship (Brahmas) 15–25 | Hakeem Butler (OPOY); Chris Garrett (STPOY) | Anthony Becht | .733 |
| 2025 | 2025 | UFL | XFL | —N/a | 1st^{#} | 8 | 2 | Lost XFL Conference Championship (Defenders) 18–36 | | Anthony Becht | .733 |
| 2026 | 2026 | UFL | —N/a | —N/a | 2nd^{#} | 6 | 4 | Lost Semifinals (Kings) 20–29 | | Ricky Proehl | .545 |
| Total | | | | | | 31 | 14 | All-time regular season record (2020–2026) | | | .689 |
| Total | | | | | | 0 | 3 | All-time postseason record (2020–2026) | | | .000 |
| Total | | | | | | 31 | 17 | All-time regular season and postseason record (2020–2026) | | | .646 |

== Records ==
All-time Battlehawks leaders
| Leader | Player | Record | Years with Battlehawks |
|---|---|---|---|
| Passing yards | A. J. McCarron | 3,732 passing yards | 2023–2024 |
| Passing Touchdowns | A. J. McCarron | 34 passing touchdowns | 2023–2024 |
| Rushing yards | Jacob Saylors | 960 rushing yards | 2024–2025 |
| Rushing Touchdowns | Jacob Saylors | 10 rushing touchdowns | 2024–2025 |
| Receiving yards | Hakeem Butler | 2,192 receiving yards | 2023–present |
| Receiving Touchdowns | Hakeem Butler | 20 receiving touchdowns | 2023–present |
| Receptions | Hakeem Butler | 138 receptions | 2023–present |
| Tackles | Willie Harvey Jr. | 196 tackles | 2023–2025 |
| Sacks | Pita Taumoepenu | 18 sacks | 2024–2026 |
| Interceptions | Brandon Sebastian | 5 interceptions | 2023–2025 |
| Coaching wins | Anthony Becht | 22 wins | 2023–2025 |

=== Starting quarterbacks ===
Regular season – As of June 9, 2026

| Season(s) | Quarterback(s) | Notes | Ref |
|---|---|---|---|
| 2020 | Jordan Ta'amu (3–2) | | |
| 2021–2022 | Suspended operations | | |
| 2023 | A. J. McCarron (6–3) / Nick Tiano (1–0) | | |
| 2024 | A. J. McCarron (6–2) / Manny Wilkins (1–1) | | |
| 2025 | Max Duggan (5–0) / Manny Wilkins (2–2) / Brandon Silvers (1–0) | | |
| 2026 | Brandon Silvers (2–1) / Harrison Frost (2–1) / Luis Perez (2–2) | | |

Postseason

| Season(s) | Quarterback(s) | Notes | Ref |
|---|---|---|---|
| 2024 | A. J. McCarron (0–1) | | |
| 2025 | Max Duggan (0–1) | | |
| 2026 | Luis Perez (0–1) | | |

Most games as starting quarterback

| Name | Period | GP | GS | W | L | Pct |
|---|---|---|---|---|---|---|
| A. J. McCarron | 2023–2024 | 17 | 17 | 12 | 5 | .706 |
| Manny Wilkins | 2023–2025 | 9 | 6 | 3 | 3 | .500 |
| Max Duggan | 2025 | 8 | 5 | 5 | 0 | 1.000 |
| Brandon Silvers | 2024–2026 | 6 | 4 | 3 | 1 | .750 |
| Jordan Ta'amu | 2020 | 5 | 5 | 3 | 2 | .600 |
| Luis Perez | 2026 | 4 | 4 | 2 | 2 | .500 |
| Harrison Frost | 2026 | 4 | 3 | 2 | 1 | .667 |
| Nick Tiano | 2023 | 4 | 1 | 1 | 0 | 1.000 |

=== Attendance ===
XFL/UFL Attendance Records
| Year | Week | Team | Attendance |
| 2024 | 2 | St. Louis Battlehawks | 40,317 |
| 2023 | 4 | St. Louis Battlehawks | 38,310 |
| 2023 | 5 | St. Louis Battlehawks | 35,868 |
| 2023 | 8 | St. Louis Battlehawks | 35,167 |
| 2024 | 10 | St. Louis Battlehawks | 34,379 |
| 2023 | 9 | St. Louis Battlehawks | 33,142 |
| 2023 | 10 | St. Louis Battlehawks | 33,034 |
| 2024 | 6 | St. Louis Battlehawks | 32,969 |
| 2024 | 8 | St. Louis Battlehawks | 32,403 |
| 2025 | 2 | St. Louis Battlehawks | 32,115 |

=== Year-by-year ===
| Season | Head Coach | League | Avg. Crowd | Home Record |
|---|---|---|---|---|
| 2020 | Jonathan Hayes | XFL | 28,541 | 2–0 |
| 2023 | Anthony Becht | XFL | 35,104 | 3–2 |
| 2024 | Anthony Becht | UFL | 34,365 | 5–0 |
| 2025 | Anthony Becht | UFL | 29,537 | 5–1 |
| 2026 | Ricky Proehl | UFL | 23,239 | 3–2 |

== Market overview ==
During the 2020 season, the Battlehawks were the only XFL team that was founded in a market that lacked a current National Football League franchise. St. Louis hosted NFL football in 1923 with the All-Stars, 1934 with the Gunners, 1960 to 1987 with the Cardinals, and again from 1995 to 2015 with the Rams, which moved to Los Angeles in the 2016 season. There is a significant negative sentiment against the NFL in St. Louis, as the owners of the Cardinals and Rams moved to other markets, with the Cardinals saying the city and county governments of St. Louis declined to provide an adequate new stadium and the Rams saying the Dome at America's Center was unacceptable and rejecting the offer of a new stadium in the market in favor of relocating back to Los Angeles. As St. Louis was one of the most recent cities to lose an NFL team, with acceptable facilities by XFL standards, the dome was seen as a good choice. In 2026, following the Kansas City Chiefs' announcement of its own plans to leave the state of Missouri for a new stadium in the state of Kansas, Missouri State Senator Nick Schroer introduced a resolution seeking to declare the Battlehawks as Missouri's official professional football team, stripping that distinction from the Chiefs, who had been declared as such by resolution in 2019. This resolution was passed in July but will not take effect until after the Chiefs' last game in the state, should the Battlehawks and UFL survive that long.

St. Louis has hosted one alternative professional football team: the Arena Football League's St. Louis Stampede of 1995 and 1996. None of the major alternative outdoor leagues of the late 20th and early 21st centuries had a team there. Some indoor football teams have played at Family Arena in suburban St. Charles, Missouri, including the RiverCity Rage and River City Raiders. Until Lindenwood University (located in St. Charles) joined the Ohio Valley Conference in 2022, St. Louis had also been devoid of NCAA Division I football at both the FBS and FCS levels since 1949, when the Saint Louis University Billikens dropped football as an intercollegiate sport; the nearest FBS football squad, the Missouri Tigers, play in Columbia, and since 2023 with the return of the Battlehawks, the Tigers have played occasional home games at the Dome, sharing an aging roll-away turf surface with the Battlehawks that proved to be unsightly when relined for the Tigers' use. This prompted a substantial renovation to improve the turf and lighting in 2024.

The St. Louis Battlehawks share the Missouri winter sports market with one other major professional team, the National Hockey League's St. Louis Blues, and with the Billikens', Lions' and Tigers' college basketball teams. In the spring the Battlehawks share the pro sports market with Major League Soccer's St Louis City SC and the Major League Baseball St Louis Cardinals.

The Dome at America's Center was built for a future National Football League expansion team or relocation and as an addition to the adjoining St. Louis Convention Center. In 1995, the under-construction dome lured the Los Angeles Rams to St. Louis. After the Rams left in 2016, the Dome continued to host a plethora of other events, enough that the stadium was unable to host a team in the former Alliance of American Football for the 2019 season. The XFL rented the Dome for $800,000 per season (a $300,000 flat fee plus $100,000 for each game) in exchange for keeping all of the revenue from ticket sales; the St. Louis Convention and Visitors Commission keeps concession and parking revenue. As part of the agreement to return in 2023, the XFL signed a three-year lease on the Dome with similar terms to its 2020 lease. For XFL games, the Dome has a reduced capacity, similar to the San Antonio Brahmas use of the Alamodome and the Orlando Guardians at Camping World Stadium. The terms of the lease offer a per-ticket rebate if a sufficient number of tickets are sold in a given game, the proceeds from which covered the majority of the XFL's cost to rent the facility. After two consecutive sellouts of the lower bowl, city officials began planning to open up some sections of the upper decks to accommodate more fans while still maintaining the up-close intimate atmosphere the league seeks. This carried over into the 2023 season, with an estimated 35,000 tickets sold for the team's March 11 home opener and the upper decks of the dome being opened to accommodate the high demand. The game drew an XFL record 38,310 attendance, eclipsing the previous record St. Louis set in 2020 and record of 38,253 set by the San Francisco Demons of the original XFL in 2001. Season ticket sales remained robust heading into the 2024 season as the team opened up more seating in the middle decks of the stadium to season ticket sales. Such was the Battlehawks' strength in ticket sales that the UFL gave the Battlehawks an extra home game for the 2025 UFL season, with what would have been the team's in-conference away game against the San Antonio Brahmas moved to St. Louis due to schedule conflicts at San Antonio's home stadium, the Alamodome.

The Battlehawks lead the league in followers on Twitter, Instagram, and in fan attendance. The St. Louis media market led the nation in television viewership for the opening week, posting a 7.4 Nielsen rating for the Battlehawks' first game. Thousands of fans could be heard chanting “Kroenke sucks!” during the first Battlehawks home game, in reference to Los Angeles Rams owner Stan Kroenke who controversially moved the St. Louis Rams back to Los Angeles, California following the 2015 NFL season.

In February 2026, incoming UFL co-owner Mike Repole cast doubt on the Battlehawks' future in the Dome, echoing previous statements about not being the "right environment" that he previously made in revoking the San Antonio Brahmas' lease on the Alamodome and his longstanding preference for soccer-specific stadiums; he stated that he had begun "preliminary" discussions with Energizer Park to move the team there. This proposal was opposed by coach Ricky Proehl, who noted that the Dome's extensive parking space provided an ideal tailgating atmosphere that Energizer Park did not and that Proehl had a target of 40,000 fans per game for 2026 to prevent the change in stadiums from occurring.
