= 2023 Houston Roughnecks season =

American professional football season

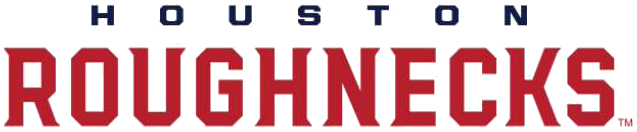
- Owner: Alpha Acquico, LLC
- General manager: Wade Phillips
- Head coach: Wade Phillips
- Home stadium: TDECU Stadium

Results
- Record: 7–3
- Division place: 1st XFL South
- Playoffs: Lost Division Finals (vs. Arlington Renegades) 11–26

The 2023 Houston Roughnecks season was the second season for the Houston Roughnecks as a professional American football franchise. They played as charter members of the XFL, one of eight teams to compete in the league for the 2023 season. The Roughnecks played their home games at the TDECU Stadium and were led by head coach Wade Phillips.

Earning their first playoff berth and clinching first place in the South Division, the Roughnecks were eliminated by the Arlington Renegades in the South Division title game in the playoffs.

This was the last season before the XFL merged with the United States Football League to form United Football League (UFL). As part of the merger agreement leading up to the 2024 season, the XFL's Roughnecks would disband and the USFL's Houston Gamblers would take over the Roughnecks name.

== Final roster ==
2023 Houston Roughnecks final roster
Quarterbacks: 5 Kaleb Eleby; 14 Cole McDonald; 12 Brandon Silvers; Running backs: 26 Brycen Alleyne; 22 Max Borghi; 35 Jeremy Cox; 20 Dejoun Lee; 21 Garrett Owens; Wide receivers: 83 Michael Bandy; 1 Deontay Burnett; 2 Cedric Byrd; 6 Travell Harris; 80 Ben Putman; 86 Tavonn Salter; 10 Justin Smith	Offensive linemen: 75 Jachai Baker T; 76 Sage Doxtater T; 78 Dylan Pasqualli G; 77 Ryan Pope T; 55 Alex Mollette C; 79 James Moore T; 56 Dareuan Parker G; 64 Jack Snyder G/T; 70 John Yarbrough G/C; Defensive linemen: 98 C. J. Brewer DE; 96 Jack Heflin NT; 97 Glen Logan NT; 99 Trevon Mason DE; 94 Scean Mustin NT; 57 Charles Wiley DE	Linebackers: 11 Tavante Beckett ILB; 36 Caliph Brice ILB; 45 John Daka OLB; 52 Emmanuel Ellerbee ILB; 33 Trent Harris OLB; 17 DeAndre Johnson OLB; 27 Drew Lewis ILB; 47 Chauncey Rivers OLB; 15 Nate Wieland ILB; Defensive backs: 25 John Brannon FS; 28 Stephen Denmark CB; 3 Ajene Harris CB; 29 A. J. Hendy FS; 4 Will Likely CB; 24 Alexander Myres CB; 18 Jordan Mosley SS; 16 Raleigh Texada CB; 31 David Tolentino Jr. CB; Special teams: 8 Austin Jones K; 42 Brian Khoury LS; 46 Race Porter P	Reserve lists: -- Ellis Brooks ILB (IR); 23 Sean Davis SS (IR); 90 Austin Edwards DE (IR); 53 Duke Ejiofor OLB (IR); 13 Jontre Kirklin WR (IR); 19 Sewo Olonilua FB (IR); 49 Derick Roberson DE (IR); -- James Stanley T (IR); -- Warren Thomas OLB (IR); 89 Tim Ward DE (IR); 51 active, 10 inactive

== Schedule ==
All times Central

Week	Day	Date	Kickoff	TV	Opponent	Results		Location	Attendance
Week	Day	Date	Kickoff	TV	Opponent	Score	Record	Location	Attendance
1	Saturday	February 18	7:30 p.m.	ESPN/FX	Orlando Guardians	33–12	1–0	TDECU Stadium	12,784
2	Sunday	February 26	6:00 p.m.	ESPN2	Arlington Renegades	23–14	2–0	TDECU Stadium	11,765
3	Sunday	March 5	7:00 p.m.	ESPN2	San Antonio Brahmas	22–13	3–0	TDECU Stadium	11,309
4	Saturday	March 11	6:00 p.m.	FX	at Orlando Guardians	44–16	4–0	Camping World Stadium	10,013
5	Thursday	March 16	9:30 p.m.	ESPN	at Seattle Sea Dragons	14–21	4–1	Lumen Field	9,231
6	Monday	March 27	6:00 p.m.	ESPN2	at DC Defenders	26–37	4–2	Audi Field	12,492
7	Sunday	April 2	1:00 p.m.	ESPN	St. Louis BattleHawks	15–24	4–3	TDECU Stadium	12,013
8	Sunday	April 9	2:00 p.m.	ABC	at San Antonio Brahmas	17–15 (OT)	5–3	Alamodome	12,243
9	Saturday	April 15	11:30 a.m.	ABC	Vegas Vipers	28–21	6–3	TDECU Stadium	10,967
10	Sunday	April 23	2:00 p.m.	ESPN	at Arlington Renegades	25–9	7–3	Choctaw Stadium	12,821

=== Game summaries ===
==== Week 1: vs. Orlando Guardians ====
Week 1: Orlando Guardians at Houston Roughnecks – Game summary

Quarter	1	2	3	4	Total
Guardians	6	0	0	6	12
Roughnecks	6	15	0	12	33

at TDECU Stadium, Houston, Texas

- Date: February 18
- Game time: 7:30 p.m. CDT
- Game weather: 51 °F (11 °C)
- Game attendance: 12,784
- Referee: Chris Coyte
- TV announcers (ESPN): Lowell Galindo, Sam Acho, and Taylor McGregor

Game information

First quarter

- ORL – Cody Latimer 27-yard pass from Paxton Lynch (2-pt Conversion No Good), 10:01. Guardians 6-0. Drive: 10 plays, 77 yards, 4:59.
- HOU – Jontre Kirklin 10-yard pass from Brandon Silvers (1-pt Conversion No Good), 2:22. Tied 6-6. Drive: 7 plays, 52 yards, 3:22.

Second quarter

- HOU – Deontay Burnett 46-yard pass from Brandon Silvers (1-pt Conversion No Good), 10:59. Roughnecks 12-6. Drive: 6 plays, 70 yards, 2:41.
- HOU – Max Borghi 27-yard run (1-pt Conversion No Good), 6:04. Roughnecks 18-6. Drive: 5 plays, 42 yards, 2:28.
- HOU – Hunter Duplessis 33-yard field goal, 1:52. Roughnecks 21-6. Drive: 6 plays, 47 yards, 2:21.

Third quarter

- No Scoring Plays.

Fourth quarter

- HOU – Hunter Duplessis 33-yard field goal, 10:18. Roughnecks 24–6. Drive: 9 plays, 44 yards, 4:36.
- ORL – Andrew Jamiel 51-yard pass from Quinten Dormady (3-pt Conversion No Good), 10:29. Roughnecks 24-12. Drive: 8 plays, 76 yards, 3:30.
- HOU – Cole McDonald 5-yard rush (1-pt Conversion No Good), 3:08. Roughnecks 30-12. Drive: 4 plays, 13 yards, 1:43.
- HOU – Hunter Duplessis 22-yard field goal, 1:23. Roughnecks 33-12. Drive: 4 plays, 5 yards, 0:30.

Top passers

- ORL – Quinten Dormady – 12/18, 142 yards, 1 TD, 2 INT
- HOU – Brandon Silvers – 26/42, 272 yards, 2 TD, 2 INT

Top rushers

- ORL – Jah-Maine Martin – 9 rushes, 41 yards
- HOU – Max Borghi – 8 rushes, 42 yards

Top receivers

- ORL – Andrew Jamiel – 3 receptions, 80 yards
- HOU – Deontay Burnett – 8 receptions, 90 yards

==== Week 2: vs. Arlington Renegades ====
Week 2: Arlington Renegades at Houston Roughnecks – Game summary

Quarter	1	2	3	4	Total
Renegades	0	14	0	0	14
Roughnecks	11	0	6	6	23

at TDECU Stadium, Houston, Texas

- Date: February 26
- Game time: 6:00 p.m. CDT
- Game weather: 75 °F (24 °C)
- Game attendance: 11,765
- Referee: Jeff Heaser
- TV announcers (ESPN2): Matt Barrie, Joey Galloway, and Tiffany Blackmon

Game information

First quarter

- HOU – Hunter Duplessis 42-yard field goal, 12:10. Roughnecks 3–0. Drive: 6 Plays, 22 Yards, 2:40.
- HOU – Nick Holley 5-yard pass from Brandon Silvers (2-pt Conversion Good by Jontre Kirklin), 7:40. Roughnecks 11–0. Drive: 1 Play, 95 Yards, 0:05.

Second quarter

- ARL – LuJuan Winningham 4-yard pass from Drew Plitt (2-pt Conversion No Good), 9:23. Roughnecks 11–6. Drive: 6 Plays, 23 Yards, 2:59.
- ARL – Nate Becker 13-yard pass from Drew Plitt (2-pt Conversion Good by Tyler Vaughns), 3:53. Renegades 14–11. Drive: 4 Plays, 40 Yards, 1:44.

Third quarter

- HOU – Cedric Byrd 15-yard pass from Brandon Silvers (1-pt Conversion No Good), 7:42. Roughnecks 17–14. Drive: 6 Plays, 45 Yards, 2:55.

Fourth quarter

- HOU – Max Borghi 4-yard rush (1-pt Conversion No Good), 5:00. Roughnecks 23–14. Drive:13 Plays, 70 Yards, 7:44.

Top passers

- ARL – Drew Plitt – 15/29, 120 yards, 2 TD, INT
- HOU – Brandon Silvers – 14/28, 173 yards, 2 TD

Top rushers

- ARL – De'Veon Smith – 7 rushes, 16 yards
- HOU – Cole McDonald – 12 rushes, 27 yards

Top receivers

- ARL – Sal Cannella – 4 receptions, 38 yards
- HOU – Ben Putman – 4 receptions, 65 yards

==== Week 3: vs. San Antonio Brahmas ====
Week 3: San Antonio Brahmas at Houston Roughnecks – Game summary

Quarter	1	2	3	4	Total
Brahmas	7	0	6	0	13
Roughnecks	8	14	0	0	22

at TDECU Stadium, Houston, Texas

- Date: March 5
- Game time: 7:00 p.m. CDT
- Game weather: 69 °F (21 °C)
- Game attendance: 11,309
- Referee: Jason Autrey
- TV announcers (ESPN2): Tom Hart, Greg McElroy, and Cole Cubelic

Game information

First quarter

- SA – T. J. Vasher 9-yard pass from Jack Coan (1-pt Conversion Good by T. J. Vasher), 12:29. Brahmas 7–0. Drive: 5 Plays, 36 Yards, 2:31.
- HOU – Jontre Kirklin 7-yard pass from Brandon Silvers (2-pt Conversion Good by Jontre Kirklin), 8:30. Roughnecks 8–7. Drive: 8 Plays, 45 Yards, 3:59.

Second quarter

- HOU – Jontre Kirklin 3-yard pass from Brandon Silvers (2-pt Conversion No Good), 11:16. Roughnecks 14–7. Drive: 8 Plays, 84 Yards, 3:51.
- HOU – Deontay Burnett 18-yard pass from Brandon Silvers (2-pt Conversion Good by Cole McDonald), 4:54. Roughnecks 22–7. Drive: 7 Plays, 72 Yards, 3:39.

Third quarter

- SA – Jacques Patrick 2-yard rush (2-pt Conversion No Good), 2:53. Roughnecks 22–13. Drive: 8 Plays, 45 Yards, 5:16.

Fourth quarter

Top passers

- SA – Jack Coan – 8/20, 64 yards, 1 TD
- HOU – Brandon Silvers – 24/35, 278 yards, 3 TD

Top rushers

- SA – Kalen Ballage – 10 rushes, 35 yards
- HOU – Max Borghi – 15 rushes, 74 yards

Top receivers

- SA – Alize Mack – 3 receptions, 27 yards
- HOU – Jontre Kirklin – 6 receptions, 77 yards

==== Week 4: at Orlando Guardians ====
Week 4: Houston Roughnecks at Orlando Guardians – Game summary

Quarter	1	2	3	4	Total
Roughnecks	20	6	6	12	44
Guardians	0	10	6	0	16

at Camping World Stadium, Orlando, Florida

- Date: March 11
- Game time: 6:00 p.m. CDT
- Game weather: 76 °F (24 °C)
- Game attendance: 10,013
- Referee: Reggie Smith
- TV announcers (FX): John Schriffen, Tom Luginbill, and Stormy Buonantony

Game information

First quarter

- HOU – Travell Harris 21-yard pass from Brandon Silvers (2-pt Conversion No Good), 11:10. Roughnecks 6–0. Drive: 7 Plays, 52 Yards, 3:50.
- HOU – Fumble recovery returned for touchdown by William Likely (2-pt Conversion Good by Jontre Kirkland), 9:53. Roughnecks 14–0. Drive: 3 Plays, 27 Yards, 1:17.
- HOU – Deontay Burnett 49-yard pass from Jontre Kirklin (2-pt Conversion No Good), 4:15. Roughnecks 20–0. Drive: 5 Plays, 66 Yards, 2:44.

Second quarter

- ORL – José Borregales 33-yard field goal, 9:16. Roughnecks 20–3. Drive: 10 Plays, 35 Yards, 5:20.
- HOU – Jontre Kirklin 42-yard pass from Brandon Silvers (2-pt Conversion No Good), 1:01. Roughnecks 26–3. Drive: 1 Play, 39 Yards, 0:07.
- ORL – Jaylen Smith 31-yard pass from Paxton Lynch (1-pt Conversion Good by Charleston Rambo), 0:39. Roughnecks 26–10. Drive: 2 Plays, 30 Yards, 0:22.

Third quarter

- ORL – Charleston Rambo 81-yard pass from Paxton Lynch (2-pt Conversion No Good), 10:50. Roughnecks 26–16. Drive: 1 Play, 78 Yards, 0:11.
- HOU – Dejoun Lee 1-yard rush (2-pt Conversion No Good), 2:08. Roughnecks 32–16. Drive: 8 Plays, 71 Yards, 4:34.

Fourth quarter

- HOU – Travell Harris 59-yard pass from Brandon Silvers (2-pt Conversion No Good), 10:57. Roughnecks 38–16. Drive: 3 Plays, 57 Yards, 1:57.
- HOU – Dejoun Lee 1-yard rush (2-pt Conversion No Good), 3:40. Roughnecks 44–16. Drive: 8 Plays, 61 Yards, 4:17.

Top passers

- HOU – Brandon Silvers – 24/30, 239 yards, 3 TD
- ORL – Paxton Lynch – 18/30, 267 yards, 2 TD

Top rushers

- HOU – Dejoun Lee – 6 rushes, 45 yards
- ORL – Devin Darrington – 12 rushes, 40 yards

Top receivers

- HOU – Travell Harris – 3 receptions, 83 yards
- ORL – Cody Latimer – 4 receptions, 57 yards

==== Week 5: at Seattle Sea Dragons ====
Week 5: Houston Roughnecks at Seattle Sea Dragons – Game summary

Quarter	1	2	3	4	Total
Roughnecks	0	0	0	14	14
Sea Dragons	6	9	0	6	21

at Lumen Field, Seattle, Washington

- Date: March 16
- Game time: 9:30 p.m. CDT
- Game weather: 48 °F (9 °C)
- Game attendance: 9,231
- Referee: Jason Autrey
- TV announcers (ESPN): Lowell Galindo, Sam Acho, and Taylor McGregor

Game information

First quarter

- SEA – Ben DiNucci 20-yard rush (3-pt Conversion No Good), 3:43. Sea Dragons 6–0. Drive: 7 Plays, 46 Yards, 3:23.

Second quarter

- SEA – Damion Willis 9-yard pass from Ben DiNucci (3-pt Conversion Good by Juwan Green), 0:45. Sea Dragons 15–0. Drive: 9 Plays, 90 Yards, 3:38.

Third quarter

Fourth quarter

- HOU – Max Borghi 1-yard rush (2-pt Conversion No Good), 7:22. Sea Dragons 15–6. Drive: 4 Plays, 25 Yards, 2:04.
- SEA – Darius Bradwell 3-yard rush (3-pt Conversion No Good), 1:22. Sea Dragons 21–6. Drive: 6 Plays, 38 Yards, 2:25.
- HOU – Justin Smith 47-yard pass from Brandon Silvers (2-pt Conversion Good by Deontay Burnett), 0:29. Sea Dragons 21–14. Drive: 8 Plays, 74 Yards, 0:58.

Top passers

- HOU – Brandon Silvers – 25/47, 227 yards, 1 TD
- SEA – Ben DiNucci – 17/32, 209 yards, 1 TD

Top rushers

- HOU – Max Borghi – 6 rushes, 12 yards
- SEA – Darius Bradwell – 9 rushes, 12 yards

Top receivers

- HOU – Travell Harris – 5 receptions, 58 yards
- SEA – Jahcour Pearson – 5 receptions, 82 yards

==== Week 6: at DC Defenders ====
Week 6: Houston Roughnecks at DC Defenders – Game summary

Quarter	1	2	3	4	Total
Roughnecks	8	0	6	12	26
Defenders	3	14	9	11	37

at Audi Field, Washington, DC

- Date: March 27
- Game time: 6:00 p.m. CDT
- Game weather: 60 °F (16 °C)
- Game attendance: 12,492
- Referee: Reggie Smith
- TV announcers (ESPN2): Taylor Zarzour, Tom Luginbill, and Stormy Buonantony

Game information

First quarter

- HOU – Max Borghi 4-yard rush (2-pt Conversion Good by Cedric Byrd), 5:08. Roughnecks 8–0. Drive: 8 Plays, 66 Yards, 4:32.
- DC – Matt McCrane 34-yard field goal, 1:18. Roughnecks 8–3. Drive: 8 Plays, 52 Yards, 3:50.

Second quarter

- DC – Abram Smith 1-yard rush (2-pt Conversion No Good), 1:57. Defenders 9–8. Drive: 10 Plays, 61 Yards, 4:37.
- DC – Interception returned for touchdown by Santos Ramirez (2-pt Conversion Good by Josh Hammond), 1:15. Defenders 17–8. Drive: 1 Play, -12 Yards, 0:42.

Third quarter

- DC – Alex Ellis 1-yard pass from Jordan Ta'amu (2-pt Conversion No Good), 10:12. Defenders 23–8. Drive: 8 Plays, 72 Yards, 4:48.
- DC – Matt McCrane 32-yard field goal, 2:08. Defenders 26–8. Drive: 11 Plays, 44 Yards, 6:03.
- HOU – Deontay Burnett 85-yard pass from Cole McDonald (3-pt Conversion No Good), 1:19. Defenders 26–14. Drive: 2 Plays, 86 Yards, 0:49.

Fourth quarter

- DC – Lucky Jackson 30-yard pass from Jordan Ta'amu (2-pt Conversion Good by Chris Blair), 13:16. Defenders 34–14. Drive: 6 Plays, 76 Yards, 3:04.
- HOU – Max Borghi 1-yard rush (2-pt Conversion No Good), 10:03. Defenders 34–20. Drive: 6 Plays, 65 Yards, 3:12.
- DC – Matt McCrane 50-yard field goal, 6:14. Defenders 37–20. Drive: 7 Plays, 36 Yards, 3:49.
- HOU – Cole McDonald 1-yard rush (3-pt Conversion No Good), 1:57. Defenders 37–26. Drive: 9 Plays, 62 Yards, 4:17.

Top passers

- HOU – Brandon Silvers – 10/17, 111 yards, 0 TD
- DC – Jordan Ta'amu – 19/31, 245 yards, 2 TD

Top rushers

- HOU – Max Borghi – 11 rushes, 25 yards
- DC – Abram Smith – 19 rushes, 95 yards

Top receivers

- HOU – Travell Harris – 5 receptions, 60 yards
- DC – Lucky Jackson – 5 receptions, 136 yards

==== Week 7: vs. St. Louis BattleHawks ====
Week 7: St. Louis BattleHawks at Houston Roughnecks – Game summary

Quarter	1	2	3	4	Total
BattleHawks	6	11	0	7	24
Roughnecks	0	9	0	6	15

at TDECU Stadium, Houston, Texas

- Date: April 2
- Game time: 1:00 p.m. CDT
- Game weather: 82 °F (28 °C)
- Game attendance: 12,013
- Referee: Jeff Heaser
- TV announcers (ESPN2): Tom Hart, Greg McElroy, and Cole Cubelic

Game information

First quarter

- STL – Gary Jennings Jr. 14-yard pass from A. J. McCarron (2-pt Conversion No Good), 4:18. BattleHawks 6–0. Drive: 13 Plays, 96 Yards, 7:53.

Second quarter

- HOU – Deontay Burnett 1-yard pass from Cole McDonald (1-pt Conversion No Good), 13:34. Tied 6–6. Drive: 11 plays, 69 yards, 5:44.
- STL – Hakeem Butler 5-yard pass from A. J. McCarron (2-pt Conversion Good by Hakeem Butler), 8:22. BattleHawks 14–6. Drive: 8 plays, 45 yards, 5:12.
- HOU – Hunter Duplessis 25-yard field goal, 3:11. BattleHawks 14–9. Drive: 10 Plays, 63 Yards, 5:11.
- STL – Donny Hageman 59-yard field goal, 0:01. BattleHawks 17–9. Drive: 2 Plays, 8 Yards, 0:05.

Third quarter

Fourth quarter

- HOU – Fumble recovery returned for touchdown by William Likely (2-pt Conversion No Good), 10:44. BattleHawks 17–15. Drive: 1 Play, 0 Yards, 0:23.
- STL – Darrius Shepherd 10-yard pass from A. J. McCarron (1-pt Conversion Good by Brian Hill), 3:54. BattleHawks 24–15. Drive: 11 Plays, 74 Yards, 6:49.

Top passers

- STL – A. J. McCarron – 26/34, 222 yards, 3 TD
- HOU – Cole McDonald – 15/32, 106 yards, 1 TD

Top rushers

- STL – Brian Hill – 11 rushes, 53 yards
- HOU – Max Borghi – 9 rushes, 46 yards

Top receivers

- STL – Darrius Shepherd – 7 receptions, 70 yards
- HOU – Cedric Byrd – 7 receptions, 50 yards

==== Week 8: at San Antonio Brahmas ====
Week 8: Houston Roughnecks at San Antonio Brahmas – Game summary

Quarter	1	2	3	4	OT	Total
Roughnecks	6	3	6	0	2	17
Brahmas	3	3	0	9	0	15

at Alamodome, San Antonio, Texas

- Date: April 9
- Game time: 2:00 p.m. CDT
- Game weather: 70 °F (21 °C)
- Game attendance: 12,243
- Referee: Francisco Villar
- TV announcers (ABC): Tom Hart, Greg McElroy, Cole Cubelic and Kris Budden

Game information

First quarter

- HOU – Deontay Burnett 3-yard pass from Brandon Silvers (1-pt Conversion No Good), 8:52. Roughnecks 6–0. Drive: 12 Plays, 70 Yards, 6:08.
- SA – Parker Romo 26-yard field goal, 2:00. Roughnecks 6–3. Drive: 13 Plays, 63 Yards, 6:52.

Second quarter

- SA – Parker Romo 42-yard field goal, 6:29. Tied 6–6. Drive: 13 Plays, 66 Yards, 7:23.
- HOU – Austin Jones 41-yard field goal, 1:01. Roughnecks 9–6. Drive: 11 Plays, 52 Yards, 5:28

Third quarter

- HOU – Garrett Owens 5-yard pass from Brandon Silvers (1-pt Conversion No Good), 13:02. Roughnecks 15–6. Drive: 2 Plays, 0 Yards, 0:42.

Fourth quarter

- SA – Jacques Patrick 2-yard rush (3-pt Conversion No Good), 1:07. Roughnecks 15–12. Drive: 5 Plays, 36 Yards, 1:54.
- SA – Parker Romo 49-yard field goal, 0:07. Tied 15–15. Drive: 9 Plays, 44 Yards, 1:00.

Overtime

- HOU – Deontay Burnett pass from Cole McDonald for 2 points

Top passers

- HOU – Brandon Silvers – 17/36, 146 yards, 2 TD
- SA – Jack Coan – 23/41, 190 yards, 0 TD

Top rushers

- HOU – Max Borghi – 7 rushes, 10 yards
- SA – Jacques Patrick – 16 rushes, 96 yards

Top receivers

- HOU – Michael Bandy – 4 receptions, 29 yards
- SA – Landen Akers – 5 receptions, 62 yards

==== Week 9: vs. Vegas Vipers ====
Week 9: Vegas Vipers at Houston Roughnecks – Game summary

Quarter	1	2	3	4	Total
Vipers	6	6	0	9	21
Roughnecks	0	6	13	9	28

at TDECU Stadium, Houston, Texas

- Date: April 15
- Game time: 11:30 a.m. CDT
- Game weather: 82 °F (28 °C)
- Game attendance: 10,967
- Referee: Chris Coyte
- TV announcers (ABC): Tom Hart, Greg McElroy, Cole Cubelic and Katie George

Game information

First quarter

- VGS – Sean Price 4-yard pass from Jalan McClendon (2-pt Conversion No Good), 0:40. Vipers 6–0. Drive: 9 Plays, 75 Yards, 4:41.

Second quarter

- VGS – Cinque Sweeting 2-yard pass from Jalan McClendon (2-pt Conversion No Good), 9:05. Vipers 12–0. Drive: 7 Plays, 41 Yards, 4:01.
- HOU – Fumble recovery returned for touchdown by Tavante Beckett (1-pt Conversion No Good), 3:49. Vipers 12–6. Drive: 6 Plays, 23 Yards, 3:18.

Third quarter

- HOU – Fumble recovery returned for touchdown by Ajene Harris (1-pt Conversion good by Tavonn Salter), 8:55. Roughnecks 13–12. Drive: 2 Plays, -1 Yards, 0:44.
- HOU – Max Borghi 2-yard rush (2-pt Conversion No Good), 1:16. Roughnecks 19–12. Drive: 8 Plays, 49 Yards, 4:00.

Fourth quarter

- VGS – Sam Sloman 53-yard field goal, 13:33. Roughnecks 19–15. Drive: 6 Plays, 30 Yards, 2:42.
- HOU – Brycen Alleyne 14-yard rush (2-pt Conversion No Good), Roughnecks 25–15. Drive: 2 Plays, 50 Yards, 0:43.
- VGS – John Lovett 25-yard rush (2-pt Conversion No Good), 6:23. Roughnecks 25–21. Drive: 4 Plays, 65 Yards, 2:28.
- HOU – Austin Jones 28-yard field goal, 1:49. Roughnecks 28–21. Drive: 10 Plays, 42 Yards, 4:34.

Top passers

- VGS – Jalan McClendon – 27/37, 249 yards, 2 TD
- HOU – Brandon Silvers – 16/27, 105 yards, 0 TD

Top rushers

- VGS – John Lovett – 9 rushes, 46 yards
- HOU – Brycen Alleyne – 12 rushes, 42 yards

Top receivers

- VGS – Geronimo Allison – 6 receptions, 60 yards
- HOU – Garrett Owens – 4 receptions, 23 yards

==== Week 10: at Arlington Renegades ====
Week 10: Houston Roughnecks at Arlington Renegades – Game summary

Quarter	1	2	3	4	Total
Roughnecks	12	0	10	3	25
Renegades	3	6	0	0	9

at Choctaw Stadium, Arlington, Texas

- Date: April 23
- Game time: 2:00 p.m. CDT
- Game weather: 51 °F (11 °C)
- Game attendance: 12,821
- Referee: Jason Autrey
- TV announcers (ESPN): Matt Barrie, Eric Mac Lain, and Tiffany Blackmon

Game information

First quarter

- HOU – Cole McDonald 10-yard rush (2-pt Conversion No Good), 10:11. Roughnecks 6–0. Drive: 9 Plays, 69 Yards, 4:50.
- ARL – Taylor Russolino 56-yard field goal, 6:35. Roughnecks 6–3. Drive: 7 Plays, 33 Yards, 3:35.
- HOU – Jeremy Cox 5-yard rush (1-pt Conversion No Good), 4:30. Roughnecks 12–3. Drive: 4 Plays, 66 Yards, 1:53.

Second quarter

- ARL – Taylor Russolino 36-yard field goal, 9:50. Roughnecks 12–6. Drive: 16 Plays, 65 Yards, 9:40.
- ARL – Taylor Russolino 19-yard field goal, 0:07. Roughnecks 12–9. Drive: 10 Plays, 53 Yards, 3:54.

Third quarter

- HOU – Austin Jones 35-yard field goal, 8:23. Roughnecks 15–9. Drive: 9 Plays, 38 Yards, 5:01.
- HOU – Pass interception returned for touchdown by Tavante Beckett (1-pt Conversion Good by Cole McDonald), 5:33. Roughnecks 22–9. Drive: 5 Plays, 20 Yards, 2:50.

Fourth quarter

- HOU – Austin Jones 38-yard field goal, 1:13. Roughnecks 25–9. Drive: 7 Plays, 41 Yards, 2:43.

Top passers

- HOU – Cole McDonald – 10/11, 120 yards, 0 TD
- ARL – Luis Perez – 22/36, 205 yards, 0 TD

Top rushers

- HOU – Jeremy Cox – 21 rushes, 120 yards
- ARL – Leddie Brown – 14 rushes, 29 yards

Top receivers

- HOU – Tavonn Salter – 4 receptions, 47 yards
- ARL – Brian Herrien – 5 receptions, 47 yards

== Standings ==
2023 XFL standings
North Division
Team	W	L	PCT	GB	TD+/-	TD+	TD-	DIV	PF	PA	DIFF	STK
(y) DC Defenders	9	1	.900	–	-2	33	35	6–0	298	240	58	W3
(x) Seattle Sea Dragons	7	3	.700	2	+10	30	20	3–3	243	177	66	W2
(e) St. Louis Battlehawks	7	3	.700	2	+9	32	23	3–3	249	202	47	W1
(e) Vegas Vipers	2	8	.200	7	0	28	28	0–6	184	252	-68	L3
South Division
Team	W	L	PCT	GB	TD+/-	TD+	TD-	DIV	PF	PA	DIFF	STK
(y) Houston Roughnecks	7	3	.700	–	+4	30	26	6–0	247	182	65	W3
(x) Arlington Renegades	4	6	.400	3	-8	15	23	3–3	146	194	-48	L2
(e) San Antonio Brahmas	3	7	.300	4	-8	16	24	3–3	169	183	-14	L1
(e) Orlando Guardians	1	9	.100	6	-5	32	37	0–6	204	310	-106	L3
(x)–clinched playoff berth; (y)–clinched division; (e)–eliminated from playoff contention

== Postseason ==
=== Schedule ===
Week	Day	Date	Kickoff	TV	Opponent	Results		Location	Attendance
Week	Day	Date	Kickoff	TV	Opponent	Score	Record	Location	Attendance
Division Finals	Saturday	April 29	6:00 p.m.	ESPN	Arlington Renegades	11–26	0–1	TDECU Stadium	13,558

=== Game summaries ===
==== XFL South Division Finals: vs. (2) Arlington Renegades ====
XFL South Division Finals: (2) Arlington Renegades vs (1) Houston Roughnecks – Game summary

Quarter	1	2	3	4	Total
Renegades	6	17	0	3	26
Roughnecks	0	8	3	0	11

at TDECU Stadium• Houston, Texas

- Date: May 2
- Game time: 6:00 p.m. CST
- Game weather: 69 °F (21 °C)
- Game attendance: 13,568
- Referee: Chris Coyte
- TV announcers (ESPN): Matt Barrie, Joey Galloway, Eric Mac Lain and Tiffany Blackmon

Game information

First quarter

- ARL – JaVonta Payton 14-yard pass from Luis Perez (2-pt Conversion No Good), 9:05. Renegades 6–0. Drive: 10 Plays, 75 Yards, 5:55.

Second quarter

- ARL – JaVonta Payton 59-yard pass from Luis Perez (2-pt Conversion Is Good by JaVonta Payton), 13:41. Renegades 14–0. Drive: 3 Plays, 70 Yards, 16:21.
- HOU – Jeremy Cox 1-yard rush (2-pt Conversion Good by Deontay Burnett), 7:01. Renegades 14–8. Drive: 12 Plays, 61 Yards, 6:38.
- ARL – Brandon Arconado 14-yard pass from Luis Perez (2-pt Conversion No Good), 4:58. Renegades 20–8. Drive: 4 Plays, 45 Yards, 2:04.
- ARL – Taylor Russolino 31-yard field goal, 0:05. Renegades 23–8. Drive: 11 Plays, 74 Yards, 2:22.

Third quarter

- HOU – Austin Jones 32-yard field goal, 5:42. Renegades 23–11. Drive: 5 Plays, 13 Yards, 2:25.

Fourth quarter

- ARL – Taylor Russolino 19-yard field goal, 1:04. Renegades 26–1. Drive: 10 Plays, 57 Yards, 4:12.

Top passers

- ARL – Luis Perez – 19/27, 289 yards, 3 TD
- HOU – Cole McDonald – 9/25, 82 yards, 0 TD

Top rushers

- ARL – De'Veon Smith – 24 rushes, 94 yards
- HOU – Max Borghi – 7 rushes, 48 yards

Top receivers

- ARL – JaVonta Payton – 5 receptions, 121 yards
- HOU – Deontay Burnett – 4 reception, 57 yards

== Staff ==
Houston Roughnecks staff
Front office: Director of team operations – Danielle Lee; Director of player personnel – Marc Lillibridge; Head coach: General Manager/Head Coach – Wade Phillips; Offensive Coaches: Offensive Coordinator/Quarterbacks – AJ Smith; Offensive Line - Andre Gurode; Running Backs - John Estes; Wide Receivers - Payton Pardee; Offensive Quality Control - Marvin Williams	Defensive Coaches: Defensive coordinator – Brian Stewart; Linebackers - A.J. Reisig; Defensive Line - Bill Johnson; Defensive Backs - Morgan Ford; Special Teams Coaches: Special Teams Coordinator - Greg McMahon; Team Operations: Athletic Trainer - Joe Resendez; Equipment Manager - Jared Mostowsky; Video Manager - Brian Martin
