= 2023 XFL season =

Second season of the XFL (2020)

- League: XFL
- Sport: American football
- Duration: Regular season: February 18 – April 23; Playoffs: April 29 – May 13
- Games: 43 (40 regular-season games, 3 postseason games)
- Teams: 8
- TV partner(s): ABC, ESPN, ESPN2, FX
- Streaming partner: ESPN+
- North champions: DC Defenders
- North runners-up: Seattle Sea Dragons
- South champions: Arlington Renegades
- South runners-up: Houston Roughnecks

2023 XFL Championship
- Venue: Alamodome, San Antonio, Texas
- Champions: Arlington Renegades
- Runners-up: DC Defenders
- Finals MVP: Luis Perez

Seasons
- ← 2020 2024 (UFL) →

The 2023 XFL season was the second season in the reboot of the XFL, the first under its new ownership group of Dwayne Johnson, Dany Garcia, and Gerry Cardinale (RedBird Capital), and the third in the history of the XFL brand created and originally owned by Vince McMahon.

The regular season began on February 18, 2023. A player combine was held on June 18, 2022; the 2023 XFL draft was held from November 15 to 17; and training camps began on January 8, 2023.

The Arlington Renegades defeated the DC Defenders in the 2023 XFL Championship Game to become the first league champions in this iteration of the XFL. This ended up being the XFL's last season before it merged with the United States Football League to form the United Football League.

== Background ==
The 2020 XFL season was cut short following five weeks of play in March 2020, as a result of immediate and prolonged stay-at-home orders and prohibitions on large gatherings imposed in an effort to stop the COVID-19 pandemic in the United States. On April 13, 2020, XFL parent company Alpha Entertainment declared bankruptcy in response to the measures, most of which would not be fully lifted until vaccines were made available and widespread in early 2021. The assets of the league were sold to Johnson, Garcia, and Cardinale on August 3, 2020.

After the purchase, the new ownership briefly considered a single-market season for 2021, but the timing of the sale process made it difficult to accomplish. During the course of the 2021 offseason, the XFL's new ownership group began discussions with the Canadian Football League regarding a potential partnership; these discussions collapsed in July, leading the league to cancel its planned 2022 season.

As McMahon fired commissioner Oliver Luck shortly before the bankruptcy; the league was left in the stewardship of Jeffrey Pollack during the transition to new ownership until Pollack resigned and was succeeded by former Buffalo Bills president Russ Brandon in November 2021.

== Teams ==
On March 11, 2022, multiple news reports indicated that the XFL had hired Reggie Barlow away from the Virginia State Trojans to serve as a head coach. The reports indicated Barlow would coach a team in San Antonio, Texas; San Antonio was not among the eight cities that hosted an XFL team in 2020 but had begun discussions with the XFL during the 2020 season and had hosted the San Antonio Commanders, the top-attended team in the Alliance of American Football (AAF) in 2019. Virginia State confirmed Barlow had taken a job with the XFL, but no confirmation from any party had verified the San Antonio team's existence.

On April 6, 2022, multiple news reports indicated that the XFL had hired their second head coach in former NFL Defensive Back Terrell Buckley. The reports indicated Buckley would coach a team in Orlando, Florida; Orlando was not among the eight cities that hosted an XFL team in 2020 but had begun discussions with the XFL about moving the Tampa Bay Vipers there during the 2020 season and had hosted the Orlando Apollos, the second top-attended team in the Alliance of American Football in 2019 and the Orlando Rage, one of the most successful teams in the original XFL in 2001.

On April 6, 2022, A report came out that sources close to the league have mentioned that XFL would be keeping five teams in their original 2020 locations (DC Defenders, St. Louis BattleHawks, Dallas Renegades, Houston Roughnecks and Seattle Dragons), following through with the Vipers proposed move to Orlando, and adding two new teams in San Antonio and Las Vegas. The teams in San Antonio and Las Vegas would replace the New York Guardians and the Los Angeles Wildcats, respectively.

On May 18, 2022, two separate reports indicated that The Dome at America's Center had left five open dates anticipating the BattleHawks' return, and that TDECU Stadium would host XFL games in 2023.

On May 22, 2022, Randy Karraker of the St. Louis-based radio station 101 ESPN reports that the XFL was to formally announce the BattleHawks' return on June 1 (no such announcement materialized). Kevin Seifert announced that cities and stadiums, which would largely be in the same scale of college, NFL and Major League Soccer venues the league had used in 2020, would be announced by the end of July, and implied that teams that did not have trademark disputes and were returning from their home cities would retain their 2020 brands.

Directors of player personnel and offensive and defensive coordinators were announced June 9, 2022. Among the announcements was the confirmation of June Jones joining Haslett's staff and former BattleHawks head coach Jonathan Hayes joining Stoops's staff in Dallas.

On July 24, 2022, Johnson and Garcia held an XFL Townhall at Texas Live! where they confirmed all 2020 XFL teams except the New York Guardians, Los Angeles Wildcats and Tampa Bay Vipers would return. New York, Los Angeles, and Tampa would be replaced by teams in San Antonio, Las Vegas and Orlando, Florida. Team 9, the non-playing unified scout team/practice squad, will also not return, with the league taking a more open approach with signing free agents midseason than it did in 2020. The league also announced seven of the eight venues, while the Las Vegas stadium would be announced on later date. On January 5, 2023 Cashman Field was announced as the Vipers home venue.

On September 23, 2022, the XFL online store leaked placeholders for the new team names, prompting speculation that the Renegades, Dragons, BattleHawks, Defenders, and Roughnecks would return to their home cities, that the Vipers brand would be transferred to Las Vegas (in homage to the Las Vegas Valley being the northwestern limit of the Western diamondback rattlesnake's natural habitat), and that the Guardians brand would be placed in Orlando. San Antonio would be branded as the Brahmas. Team identities were scheduled to be released October 31; teaser segments released the day before showed that the Dragons' and BattleHawks' new logos were exact matches to their old logos, and that color schemes matched the Renegades', Guardians', Roughnecks' and Defenders' brandings from 2020, with slight design alterations.

The league's schedule was released on January 5, 2023. With the schedule release, the league realigned to a north–south divisional alignment to allow all three Texas teams to be division rivals.

2023 XFL season teams
Club	City	Stadium	Surface	Capacity†	Head coach
South Division
Arlington Renegades	Arlington, Texas	Choctaw Stadium	Grass	25,000	Bob Stoops
Houston Roughnecks	Houston, Texas	TDECU Stadium	Turf	40,000†	Wade Phillips
Orlando Guardians	Orlando, Florida	Camping World Stadium	Turf	60,219†	Terrell Buckley
San Antonio Brahmas	San Antonio, Texas	Alamodome	Turf	64,000†	Hines Ward
North Division
DC Defenders	Washington, D.C.	Audi Field	Grass	20,000	Reggie Barlow
Seattle Sea Dragons	Seattle, Washington	Lumen Field	Turf	69,000†	Jim Haslett
St. Louis Battlehawks	St. Louis, Missouri	The Dome at America's Center	Turf	66,965†	Anthony Becht
Vegas Vipers	Las Vegas, Nevada	Cashman Field	Grass	12,500 (Note: Approximate capacity, including standing room and lawn seating. Cashman Field has 9,334 fixed seating, and it can expand to 14,500 with temporary bleachers.)	Rod Woodson

†Full stadium capacity. The large stadiums with multiple decks only open the lower bowl for XFL games, similar to the former AAF games and MLS matches played in large stadiums. The XFL has a target stadium size of 30,000 seats so that in the event of playoff games, the upper decks can be opened to increase capacity.

Locations of teams for the 2023 XFL season, (South Division - red; North Division - blue;)

== Players ==
For the 2023 season, each XFL team started training camp with up to 80-men rosters (66 originally), but had to trim it down to 70 by January 21, 2023, down to 60 two weeks later and then to 50 by February 10. Regular season rosters were supposed to stand at 50 (compared to 52 at the 2020 season), while 45 of those 50 are active on any given game day. Just before the season started the league decided to expand the rosters from 50 to 51 (46 active on game day), so all teams will be able to dress three quarterbacks on their active roster any given week. 14 players on the opening day rosters were on NFL practice squads during the 2022 season, while four 2023 CFL free agents chose to sign with XFL teams.

While in 2020 the league's primary target for players was veteran backups (such as the kind Luck developed in his time in NFL Europe, citing Kurt Warner, Brad Johnson and Jake Delhomme as examples) who may not be getting the repetitions needed to develop properly on NFL scout teams and practice squads. Due to budget concerns and an unwillingness to antagonize the NFL, it does not get into bidding wars for marquee players, but didn't intend to be is a "developmental" league to the NFL, rather a "'standalone' and 'complement' league". In contrast, the 2023 season of the XFL saw the league take a much lower emphasis on professional experience when selecting its quarterbacks, as it noted that the veterans "washed out early" compared to the younger, less experienced talent and that its 2020 breakout star—P. J. Walker—was better known at the time for bouncing on and off the Indianapolis Colts practice squad before joining the XFL and ultimately landing the starting position with the Carolina Panthers. The new ownership also embraced more of a "developmental" mentality when they signed a collaboration agreement with the NFL and introduced the "54th man" slogan, which refer to the NFL 53-men roster limit.

During the season, the XFL held centralized workouts for free agents and other athletes every Tuesday.

=== Draft ===
The XFL 2023 draft took place at the UFC Apex in Enterprise, Nevada, while the player pool consisted of 1,700 eligible players, after XFL personnel have evaluated nearly 6,000 players in seven XFL showcases, NFL training camps and tryouts. Of those, 528 players advanced to the preseason rosters.

The 2023 XFL Draft followed the same basic layout as the 2020 XFL draft: starting quarterbacks were allocated in a separate process and revealed November 15, while the remaining positions were separated by position. It followed a "snake" format, with each position phase following a random order set prior to the draft, and that order reversing between odd and even rounds of the phase.

=== Compensation ===
In 2023, the XFL uses a standard form contract paying $5,000 per week, $800 of which is guaranteed. A $1,000 victory bonus is paid to the players on each game's winning team, including inactive players. Starting quarterbacks will again be eligible for a higher salary. The base annual salary for an XFL player was $59,000, plus room and board in the league's hub at Arlington, Texas, throughout the season valued at approximately $20,000.

During training camp there was a mandatory breakfast, lunch and dinner, while the league was also supplied "grab and go" snack after dinner. During regular season the XFL provided two meals and "grab and go" snack. The league did not assist with any off-site living cost. Injured players got paid (in contrast to the 2022 USFL season).

On March 10, 2023, XFL players filed a petition (through the United Steelworkers) for a representation election with Region 16 of the National Labor Relations Board. On April 19, the XFL players decided against joining the union by a vote of 124 to 73.

=== Player movement ===
Transactions

- On January 1, quarterback Bryan Scott was assigned to the Las Vegas Vipers, but was released a month later when the Vipers signed Brett Hundley.
- On January 24, all teams finalized their mandatory 70-man rosters cut down.
- On February 6, the St. Louis Battlehawks released quarterback Ryan Willis.
- On February 9, seven of the eight teams rosters were finalized, while the Battlehawks finalized theirs three days later when they signed a third quarterback, Manny Wilkins.
- After week 2, the Guardians cut quarterback Quinten Dormady who was allegedly involved with giving the team's playbook to Brahmas player. The XFL reinstated him one day later. Additionally, it was later revealed that the accusations were false. He was put on the "Office of the President's Reserve list", and the Guardians signed Quinton Flowers as a replacement. Dormady was reinstated after the league determined that there was "no basis for disciplinary action".
- On March 4, Arlington Renegades resigned United Football Players Association president and running back Kenneth Farrow II and waived running back Keith Ford.
- On March 6, the league announced a unique three-way trade between the DC Defenders, Arlington Renegades and Orlando Guardians. DC traded offensive tackle T.J. Storment to the Orlando Guardians, Orlando traded receiver JaVonta Payton to the Arlington Renegades, and Arlington traded tight end Alex Ellis to the D.C. Defenders.
- On March 7, offensive tackle Jaryd Jones-Smith from the St. Louis Battlehawks was suspended for 2 games, because of a violation of player safety rules during the game played on March 5.
- On March 24, the rights to sign quarterback Kurt Benkert were traded from the Roughnecks to the Brahmas in exchange for linebacker Drew Lewis.
- On March 28, quarterback Luis Perez was traded from the Vipers to the Renegades for linebacker Ryan Mueller.
- On April 3, running back Phillip Lindsay signed with the Seattle Sea Dragons.
- On April 13, the St. Louis Battlehawks placed quarterback Nick Tiano on the injured reserve and signed quarterback Vincent Testaverde Jr.

=== Partnerships ===
==== Indoor Football League ====
The XFL signed a player personnel partnership with the Indoor Football League, with the IFL functioning as its de facto minor league. Brendon White was the first player to exercise the option to join the IFL when he signed with the Massachusetts Pirates, while offensive lineman Joshua Frazier would later join him after he was released by the Guardians. Receiver David Tolentino signed with the San Diego Strike Force after he finished his season with the Roughnecks. Cardale Jones, who had played in the XFL as DC's starting quarterback in 2020 and had unsuccessfully tried to win back his position in 2023, declined an offer to join the IFL.

Tulsa Oilers offensive lineman Larry Williams was the only player who did the opposite way, when he signed with Las Vegas Vipers, and was on the Vipers opening day roster.

==== NFL Alumni Academy ====
In April, 2022 the league has signed a partnership with the NFL Alumni Academy to develop potential players which state that every player graduated from the program has an "opt-in" option for XFL contract. In December rumors started circulating that the Academy is looking to terminate the partnership over payment disagreements, which was later revealed as a disagreements over the number of players drafted. The issue was later resolved and the XFL assigned Academy graduates to training camp rosters. 36 alumni were on opening day rosters, while 15 of them were "assigned" players.

=== Notable players ===
- Geronimo Allison
- Ryquell Armstead
- Marcell Ateman
- Kalen Ballage
- Vic Beasley
- Martavis Bryant
- Ben DiNucci
- Matt Elam
- Jordan Evans
- Josh Gordon
- Will Hill III
- D'Eriq King
- Marquette King
- Cody Latimer
- Phillip Lindsay
- Paxton Lynch
- A. J. McCarron
- Cole McDonald
- Eli Rogers
- D. J. Swearinger
- Jordan Ta'amu

== Coaches ==
On March 11, 2022, multiple news reports indicated that the XFL had hired Reggie Barlow away from the Virginia State Trojans to serve as a head coach. The reports indicated Barlow would coach a team in San Antonio, Texas. On April 6, 2022, multiple news reports indicated that the XFL had hired their second head coach in former NFL Defensive Back Terrell Buckley and that the league was looking to re-hire Renegades head coach Bob Stoops and potentially bring back former Vipers head coach Marc Trestman in another capacity, while noting that in regard to coaches, "the situation (was) fluid" at the time and that several other former NFL players were being considered for coaching positions.

On April 13, 2022, the XFL confirmed the hirings of Stoops, Buckley and Barlow, along with the league's five other head coaches, without identifying which teams they would coach. The other head coaches hired were Wade Phillips, Rod Woodson, Anthony Becht, Jim Haslett and Hines Ward. Haslett, who was later identified as the Seattle head coach, reportedly brought on former Roughnecks head coach June Jones as offensive coordinator, as Jones had accidentally leaked news of his new position on Twitter before it had been made official. Coaches were given a 3-year contracts.

For the 2023 season, the XFL started a pilot partnership (in collaboration with Under Armour) with the National Coalition of Minority Football Coaches (NCMFC) for exposure to minority coaches, with two coaches from the D.C. and San Antonio markets participating in the program.

=== Coaching changes ===
Of the eight head coaches in the XFL in 2020, only one, Arlington Renegades coach Bob Stoops, will return in the same position in 2023.

Coach changes for the 2023 XFL season
Team	Departing coach	Incoming coach	Notes
DC Defenders	Pep Hamilton	Reggie Barlow	Hamilton went 3–2 in his lone season as the Defenders' head coach. He left the XFL during the bankruptcy to become the quarterbacks coach of the National Football League's Los Angeles Chargers, later moving on to the Houston Texans. Barlow has eight years of professional playing experience and had spent the previous 12 seasons coaching historically black colleges and universities, most recently the Virginia State Trojans.
Orlando Guardians	Kevin Gilbride	Terrell Buckley	Gilbride went 3–2 in his lone season as New York's head coach. He had wanted to stay on with the league but was not retained. This is Buckley's first head coaching position. A 13-year veteran player in the NFL, Buckley had been a position coach at the college level the previous 15 seasons.
Houston Roughnecks	June Jones	Wade Phillips	Jones had a perfect 5–0 season with the Roughnecks in 2020. He remained with the XFL and joined the Seattle coaching staff as offensive coordinator. Phillips, son of famed Houston Oilers head coach Bum Phillips, had a long career as a coach in the NFL, including stops as head coach with the New Orleans Saints, Buffalo Bills, Denver Broncos, Atlanta Falcons, Dallas Cowboys and Houston Texans.
St. Louis BattleHawks	Jonathan Hayes	Anthony Becht	Hayes went 3–2 in his lone season as the BattleHawks' head coach. He joined Bob Stoops's staff in Arlington as offensive coordinator. This is Becht's first head coaching position. With 11 years experience as an NFL player (including a single season with the St. Louis Rams), Becht has only one season of coaching experience at any level; he was tight ends coach for the AAF's San Diego Fleet in 2019.
Seattle Sea Dragons	Jim Zorn	Jim Haslett	Zorn went 1–4 in his lone season as the Dragons' head coach. Haslett, who spent six years as a player with the Buffalo Bills, has a long record as a head coach, defensive coordinator and linebackers coach, with head coaching stints with the New Orleans Saints and the UFL's Florida Tuskers.
San Antonio Brahmas	—N/a	Hines Ward	Ward had spent 14 seasons with the NFL's Pittsburgh Steelers, had brief coaching stints with the New York Jets and Florida Atlantic University as a lower-level assistant. This is his first head coaching position. The eighth head coach position Ward is filling is that of LA Wildcats coach Winston Moss, who went 2–3 in his lone season as head coach.
Vegas Vipers	Marc Trestman	Rod Woodson	Trestman went 1–4 as the head coach in Tampa Bay. He was in discussions with the league about potentially returning as a coach if one of the other candidates bowed out, but this did not occur. Woodson is a member of the Pro Football Hall of Fame for his 17-year playing career. He had a sporadic assistant coaching career, including four discontinuous seasons with the Oakland Raiders. This is his first head coaching position.

== Rule changes ==
On December 8, 2022, the XFL announced it would be keeping its rulebook from the 2020 XFL season, with the following revisions:

- Play clock changes from 25 seconds from the spotting of the ball, to 35 seconds from the end of the previous play.
- Team timeouts increase from 2 to 3 per half.
- Regulation overtime rounds decrease from 5 to 3
- New option to convert a 4th and 15 to keep the ball in the fourth quarter. This is in addition to the traditional onside kick option, which remains in the rules.
- Teams now have one coach's challenge, which can be used to review any officiating decision without restrictions.
- In lieu of the on-site sky judge (used in the AAF and 2020 XFL season), all replay decisions will be made from a centralized hub. This hub will retain the error-correction powers the sky judge held.
- A new football will replace the proprietary design used in 2020 with a more conventional pebbling and design scheme, industry-standard Horween leather, and the signature of chairwoman Dany Garcia.

== Standings ==
2023 XFL standings
North Division
Team	W	L	PCT	GB	TD+/-	TD+	TD-	DIV	PF	PA	DIFF	STK
(y) DC Defenders	9	1	.900	–	-2	33	35	6–0	298	240	58	W3
(x) Seattle Sea Dragons	7	3	.700	2	+10	30	20	3–3	243	177	66	W2
(e) St. Louis Battlehawks	7	3	.700	2	+9	32	23	3–3	249	202	47	W1
(e) Vegas Vipers	2	8	.200	7	0	28	28	0–6	184	252	-68	L3
South Division
Team	W	L	PCT	GB	TD+/-	TD+	TD-	DIV	PF	PA	DIFF	STK
(y) Houston Roughnecks	7	3	.700	–	+4	30	26	6–0	247	182	65	W3
(x) Arlington Renegades	4	6	.400	3	-8	15	23	3–3	146	194	-48	L2
(e) San Antonio Brahmas	3	7	.300	4	-8	16	24	3–3	169	183	-14	L1
(e) Orlando Guardians	1	9	.100	6	-5	32	37	0–6	204	310	-106	L3
(x)–clinched playoff berth; (y)–clinched division; (e)–eliminated from playoff contention

== Season structure ==
=== Preseason ===
On July 25, the league announced it had struck an agreement with Arlington, Texas, to serve as the league's centralized hub. The league will host training camps (much as Houston had done in the 2020 XFL season) and practices at various locations in Arlington (Northwest ISD High School, Dragon Stadium, Vernon Newsom Stadium, and Choctaw Stadium), but unlike the United States Football League did in its 2022 season, the XFL will play games in home cities and travel to each city on weekends for games and connection opportunities with the community.

For the 2023 season each team trained at a different stadium in Arlington and share it with another team throughout the season as follows:

- Choctaw Stadium - Arlington Renegades and Houston Roughnecks.
- Vernon Newsom Stadium - DC Defenders and St. Louis BattleHawks.
- Dragon Stadium - Seattle Sea Dragons and Vegas Vipers.
- Northwest ISD High School - Orlando Guardians and San Antonio Brahmas.

While teams held joint practices, the planned untelevised "informal scrimmages" for the league's TV partners, in order to conduct trial runs for their broadcasts, were cancelled as a result of a severe weather in the Dallas Metroplex area.

=== Regular season ===
The league is divided into two divisions, North and South. Each team was given a ten-game schedule with no bye weeks, playing two games against each division rival (one home and one away) and one game against each team in the other division.

=== Postseason ===
The postseason was a four-team playoff, with the top 2 teams in each division making the postseason. On February 19, it was announced that the Alamodome in San Antonio, Texas, would host the 2023 XFL Championship.

The format attracted some criticism among league fans by the end of the regular season, as the Battlehawks finished their season with a 7–3 record and did not make the playoffs over a 4–6 Arlington Renegades team (the playoff took the top two teams from each division instead of the division winners and then the next two best teams). Not only did the Battlehawks have three more wins than the Renegades, but they also beat the Renegades in their only meeting of the season. The same complains were heard about the tie-breaker rules, which were copied from the NFL.

After the season, XFL President Russ Brandon addressed both issues: "We never thought we would get that far in the tie-breaker scenario (...) The key to anything is to keep things simple, so we'll have to clean that up (...) We'll evaluate the situation that happened this year with the playoff. looking back at it, more thought needs to go into it. that will be under review."

== Season schedule ==
All games stream on ESPN+ unless otherwise noted. Viewership figures for streaming platforms are released four weeks after the event.

=== Week 1 ===
Week 1
Date	Time	Away team	Result		Home team	Stadium	Attendance	Broadcast	Viewership (millions)	Rating	Refs
February 18	3:00 p.m. ET	Vegas Vipers	20	22	Arlington Renegades	Choctaw Stadium	12,047	ABC	1.57	0.9	
February 18	8:30 p.m. ET	Orlando Guardians	12	33	Houston Roughnecks	TDECU Stadium	12,784	ESPN and FX	1.14	0.4	
February 19	3:00 p.m. ET	St. Louis Battlehawks	18	15	San Antonio Brahmas	Alamodome	24,245	ABC	1.53	0.9	
February 19	8:00 p.m. ET	Seattle Sea Dragons	18	22	DC Defenders	Audi Field	12,438	ESPN	0.92	0.5	

=== Week 2 ===
Week 2
Date	Time	Away team	Result		Home team	Stadium	Attendance	Broadcast	Viewership (millions)	Rating	Refs
February 23	9:00 p.m. ET	St. Louis Battlehawks	20	18	Seattle Sea Dragons	Lumen Field	10,386	FX	0.55	N/A	
February 25	7:00 p.m. ET	DC Defenders	18	6	Vegas Vipers	Cashman Field	6,023	FX	0.61	N/A	
February 26	4:00 p.m. ET	San Antonio Brahmas	30	12	Orlando Guardians	Camping World Stadium	12,011	ESPN	0.78	0.4	
February 26	7:00 p.m. ET	Arlington Renegades	14	23	Houston Roughnecks	TDECU Stadium	11,765	ESPN2	0.68	0.4	

=== Week 3 ===
Week 3
Date	Time	Away team	Result		Home team	Stadium	Attendance	Broadcast	Viewership (millions)	Rating	Refs
March 4	7:00 p.m. ET	Seattle Sea Dragons	30	26	Vegas Vipers	Cashman Field	6,037	FX	0.53	0.3	
March 5	1:00 p.m. ET	St. Louis Battlehawks	28	34	DC Defenders	Audi Field	16,212	FX	0.67	0.4	
March 5	4:00 p.m. ET	Orlando Guardians	9	10	Arlington Renegades	Choctaw Stadium	12,006	FX	0.55	0.3	
March 5	8:00 p.m. ET	San Antonio Brahmas	13	22	Houston Roughnecks	TDECU Stadium	11,309	ESPN2	0.54	0.3	

=== Week 4 ===
Week 4
Date	Time	Away team	Result		Home team	Stadium	Attendance	Broadcast	Viewership (millions)	Rating	Refs
March 11	7:00 p.m. ET	Houston Roughnecks	44	16	Orlando Guardians	Camping World Stadium	10,013	FX	0.40	0.2	
March 11	10:00 p.m. ET	San Antonio Brahmas	6	15	Seattle Sea Dragons	Lumen Field	15,103	FX	0.34	0.2	
March 12	4:00 p.m. ET	Arlington Renegades	11	24	St. Louis Battlehawks	The Dome at America's Center	38,310	ESPN2	0.57	0.3	
March 12	7:00 p.m. ET	Vegas Vipers	18	32	DC Defenders	Audi Field	11,521	ESPN2	0.69	0.4	

=== Week 5 ===
Week 5
Date	Time	Away team	Result		Home team	Stadium	Attendance	Broadcast	Viewership (millions)	Rating	Refs
March 16	10:30 p.m. ET	Houston Roughnecks	14	21	Seattle Sea Dragons	Lumen Field	9,231	ESPN (Note: Game originally scheduled for a 9 p.m. ET start on FX but switched to 10:30 p.m. ET on ESPN in an effort to put more games on more common cable networks.)	0.26	0.2	
March 18	7:00 p.m. ET	DC Defenders	28	20	St. Louis Battlehawks	The Dome at America's Center	35,868	FX	0.32	0.2	
March 18	10:00 p.m. ET	Orlando Guardians	32	35	Vegas Vipers	Cashman Field	6,008	FX	0.23	0.2	
March 19	9:00 p.m. ET	Arlington Renegades	12	10	San Antonio Brahmas	Alamodome	13,274	ESPN2 (Note: Game originally scheduled for a 10 p.m. ET start on ESPN2 but switched to 9 p.m. ET in an effort to accommodate the time change.)	0.25	0.2	

=== Week 6 ===
Week 6
Date	Time	Away team	Result		Home team	Stadium	Attendance	Broadcast	Viewership (millions)	Rating	Refs
March 25	1:00 p.m. ET	Seattle Sea Dragons	26	19	Orlando Guardians	Camping World Stadium	7,832	ABC (Note: Game originally scheduled for a 1:30 p.m. ET start on ESPN but switched to 1 p.m. ET on ABC in an effort to put more games on broadcast television.)	1.05	0.7	
March 25	7:00 p.m. ET	St. Louis Battlehawks	29	6	Vegas Vipers	Cashman Field	6,033	FX	0.37	0.2	
March 26	3:00 p.m. ET	San Antonio Brahmas	15	9	Arlington Renegades	Choctaw Stadium	12,368	ABC	0.75	0.5	
March 27	7:00 p.m. ET	Houston Roughnecks	26	37	DC Defenders	Audi Field	12,492	ESPN2 (Note: Game originally scheduled to be broadcast on FX but will air on ESPN2 in an effort to put more games on more common cable networks.)	0.37	0.2	

=== Week 7 ===
Week 7
Date	Time	Away team	Result		Home team	Stadium	Attendance	Broadcast	Viewership (millions)	Rating	Refs
March 31	7:00 p.m. ET	Seattle Sea Dragons	24	15	Arlington Renegades	Choctaw Stadium	11,032	FX	0.18	N/A	
April 1	3:00 p.m. ET	San Antonio Brahmas	12	26	Vegas Vipers	Cashman Field	6,041	ESPN2 (Note: Game originally scheduled to be broadcast on ESPN but will air on ESPN2.)	0.36	0.2	
April 1	6:00 p.m. ET	DC Defenders	36	37	Orlando Guardians	Camping World Stadium	7,011	ESPN (Note: Game originally scheduled to be broadcast on FX but will air on ESPN in an effort to put more games on more common cable networks.)	0.37	0.2	
April 2	2:00 p.m. ET	St. Louis Battlehawks	24	15	Houston Roughnecks	TDECU Stadium	12,013	ESPN (Note: Game originally scheduled for a 7 p.m. ET start on ESPN2 but switched to 2 p.m. ET on ESPN in an effort to put more games on more common cable networks.)	0.50	0.3	

=== Week 8 ===
Week 8
Date	Time	Away team	Result		Home team	Stadium	Attendance	Broadcast	Viewership (millions)	Rating	Refs
April 8	1:00 p.m. ET	Vegas Vipers	17	21 (OT)	St. Louis Battlehawks	The Dome at America's Center	35,167	ESPN	0.87	0.5	
April 8	4:00 p.m. ET	Arlington Renegades	18	16	Orlando Guardians	Camping World Stadium	7,789	ESPN	0.68	0.4	
April 9	3:00 p.m. ET	Houston Roughnecks	17 (OT)	15	San Antonio Brahmas	Alamodome	12,243	ABC	1.01	0.5	
April 9	7:00 p.m. ET	DC Defenders	34	33	Seattle Sea Dragons	Lumen Field	11,874	ESPN2	0.49	0.3	

=== Week 9 ===
Week 9
Date	Time	Away team	Result		Home team	Stadium	Attendance	Broadcast	Viewership (millions)	Rating	Refs
April 15	12:30 p.m. ET	Vegas Vipers	21	28	Houston Roughnecks	TDECU Stadium	10,967	ABC	0.88	0.5	
April 15	7:00 p.m. ET	Orlando Guardians	23	25	San Antonio Brahmas	Alamodome	13,023	ESPN2	0.24	0.1	
April 16	12:00 p.m. ET	Arlington Renegades	26	28 (OT)	DC Defenders	Audi Field	18,684	ESPN	0.67	0.4	
April 16	3:00 p.m. ET	Seattle Sea Dragons	30	12	St. Louis Battlehawks	The Dome at America's Center	33,142	ESPN	0.57	0.3	

=== Week 10 ===
Week 10
Date	Time	Away team	Result		Home team	Stadium	Attendance	Broadcast	Viewership (millions)	Rating	Refs
April 22	12:00 p.m. ET	Orlando Guardians	28	53	St. Louis Battlehawks	The Dome at America's Center	33,034	ESPN	0.76	0.4	
April 22	3:00 p.m. ET	DC Defenders	29	28	San Antonio Brahmas	Alamodome	12,129	ABC	0.83	0.5	
April 23	3:00 p.m. ET	Houston Roughnecks	25	9	Arlington Renegades	Choctaw Stadium	12,821	ESPN	0.40	0.2	
April 23	7:00 p.m. ET	Vegas Vipers	9	28	Seattle Sea Dragons	Lumen Field	15,046	ESPN2 (Note: Game originally scheduled for a 9 p.m. ET start on ESPN2 but switched to 7 p.m. ET in an effort to accommodate the time change.)	0.38	0.2	

=== Playoffs ===
The playoffs started on April 29 and 30 and ended with the championship game on May 13. The North and South Semifinals were hosted by the respective division winners. The XFL Championship Game was played at the Alamodome.

Division Finals; April 29–30, 2023
N1	DC Defenders	37
N2	Seattle Sea Dragons	21
S1	Houston Roughnecks	11
S2	Arlington Renegades	26

XFL Championship; May 13, 2023
N1	DC Defenders	26
S2	Arlington Renegades	35

Division Finals
Date	Time	Away team	Result		Home team	Stadium	Attendance	Broadcast	Viewership (millions)	Rating	Refs
April 29	7:00 p.m. ET	Arlington Renegades	26	11	Houston Roughnecks	TDECU Stadium	13,558	ESPN (Note: Game originally scheduled to be broadcast on ESPN2 but will air on ESPN in an effort to put more games on more common cable networks.)	0.68	0.4	
April 30	3:00 p.m. ET	Seattle Sea Dragons	21	37	DC Defenders	Audi Field	18,684	ESPN	0.48	0.3	

XFL Championship
Date	Time	Away team	Result		Home team	Stadium	Attendance	Broadcast	Viewership (millions)	Rating	Refs
May 13	8:00 p.m. ET	DC Defenders	26	35	Arlington Renegades	Alamodome	22,754	ABC	1.40	0.8	

== Attendance ==
Announced attendance figures for each home game. In the weekly columns, dashes (—) indicate away games, while bold font indicates the highest attendance of the week.

Team / Week	1	2	3	4	5	6	7	8	9	10	Division Finals	Championship	Total	Average
**Arlington Renegades**	12,047	—	12,006	—	—	12,368	11,032	—	—	12,821	—	—	60,274	12,055
**DC Defenders**	12,438	—	**16,212**	11,521	—	**12,492**	—	—	18,684	—	**18,684**	**22,754** (San Antonio)	112,785	16,112
**Houston Roughnecks**	12,784	11,765	11,309	—	—	—	**12,013**	—	10,967	—	13,558	—N/a	72,396	12,066
**Orlando Guardians**	—	**12,011**	—	10,013	—	7,832	7,011	7,789	—	—	—N/a	—N/a	44,656	8,931
**San Antonio Brahmas**	**24,245**	—	—	—	13,274	—	—	12,243	13,023	12,129	—N/a	—N/a	74,914	14,983
**Seattle Sea Dragons**	—	10,386	—	15,103	9,231	—	—	11,874	—	15,046	—	—N/a	61,640	12,328
**St. Louis Battlehawks**	—	—	—	**38,310**	**35,868**	—	—	**35,167**	**33,142**	**33,034**	—N/a	—N/a	175,521	35,104
**Vegas Vipers**	—	6,023	6,037	—	6,008	6,033	6,041	—	—	—	—N/a	—N/a	30,142	6,028
Total	61,514	40,185	45,564	74,947	64,381	38,725	36,097	67,073	75,816	73,030	32,242	22,754	632,328	
Average	15,379	10,046	11,391	18,737	16,095	9,681	9,024	16,768	18,954	18,258	16,121	22,754		14,705

== Awards ==
=== Players of the week ===
In the 2020 XFL season the league awarded a weekly award called "The Star of the Week". In the 2023 season, the league did not employ the same system. However, some independent media companies recognized offensive, defensive, and special teams players each week.

==== OurSports Central ====
Week	Offensive Player			Defensive Player			Unsung Hero (Note: OurSports Central awarded the "Unsung Hero" award while other publications awarded the "Special Teams Player" award.)			Refs.
Week	Player	Pos.	Team	Player	Pos.	Team	Player	Pos.	Team	Refs.
1	A. J. McCarron	QB	Battlehawks	Trent Harris	OLB	Roughnecks	Austin Proehl	WR	Battlehawks	
2	Jack Coan	QB	Brahmas	LaCale London	DL	Battlehawks	Donny Hageman	K	Battlehawks	
3	Ben DiNucci	QB	Sea Dragons	Davin Bellamy	DL	Defenders	Josh Gordon	WR	Sea Dragons	
4	Brandon Silvers	QB	Roughnecks	Tuzar Skipper	OLB	Sea Dragons	D'Eriq King	QB	Defenders	
5	Abram Smith	RB	Defenders	Pita Taumoepenu	OLB	Vipers	Michael Joseph	CB	Defenders	
6	A. J. McCarron (2)	QB	Battlehawks	Santos Ramirez	S	Defenders	Antoine Brooks	S	Sea Dragons	
7	Quinten Dormady	QB	Guardians	Pita Taumoepenu (2)	OLB	Vipers	Cody Latimer	TE	Guardians	
8	Jordan Ta'amu	QB	Defenders	Will Clarke	DL	Renegades	Brian Hill	RB	Battlehawks	
9	Ben DiNucci (2)	QB	Sea Dragons	Drew Beesley	DL	Brahmas	Josh Hammond	WR	Defenders	
10	A. J. McCarron (3)	QB	Battlehawks	Tavante Beckett	ILB	Roughnecks	Jordan Ta'amu	QB	Defenders	
Division Championship	Luis Perez	QB	Renegades	Donald Payne	ILB	Renegades	Cam'Ron Harris	RB	Defenders	

==== XFLBoard.com ====
Week	Offensive Player			Defensive Player			Special Teams Player			Refs.
Week	Player	Pos.	Team	Player	Pos.	Team	Player	Pos.	Team	Refs.
1	Austin Proehl	WR	Battlehawks	Trent Harris	OLB	Roughnecks	Taylor Russolino	K	Renegades	
2	Jack Coan	QB	Brahmas	Mike Lee	S	Guardians	LuJuan Winningham	WR	Renegades	
3	Josh Gordon	WR	Sea Dragons	Davin Bellamy	DL	Defenders	Darrius Shepherd	WR	Battlehawks	
4	D'Eriq King	QB	Defenders	Luq Barcoo	CB	Brahmas	John Parker Romo	K	Brahmas	
5	Abram Smith	RB	Defenders	Ajene Harris	CB	Roughnecks	Darrius Shepherd (2)	WR	Battlehawks	
6	A. J. McCarron	QB	Battlehawks	Santos Ramirez	S	Defenders	Kelvin McKnight	WR	Sea Dragons	
7	Quinten Dormady	QB	Guardians	Pita Taumoepenu	OLB	Vipers	Fred Brown	WR	Brahmas	
8	Juwan Green	WR	Sea Dragons	Will Clarke	DL	Renegades	Gary Jennings Jr.	WR	Battlehawks	
9	Ben DiNucci	QB	Sea Dragons	Drew Beesley	DL	Brahmas	Mac Brown	P	Guardians	
10	A. J. McCarron (2)	QB	Battlehawks	Tavante Beckett	ILB	Roughnecks	Pooka Williams Jr.	RB	Defenders	
Division Championship	Luis Perez	QB	Renegades	Donald Payne	ILB	Renegades	Pooka Williams Jr. (2)	RB	Defenders	

==== XFL News Hub ====
Week	Offensive Player			Defensive Player			Special Teams Player			Refs.
Week	Player	Pos.	Team	Player	Pos.	Team	Player	Pos.	Team	Refs.
1	Deontay Burnett	WR	Roughnecks	Trent Harris	OLB	Roughnecks	Taylor Russolino	K	Renegades	
2	A. J. McCarron	QB	Battlehawks	Max Roberts	OLB	Vipers	Brad Wing	P	Brahmas	
3	Ben DiNucci	QB	Sea Dragons	Davin Bellamy	DL	Defenders	Darrius Shepherd	WR	Battlehawks	
4	Brandon Silvers	QB	Roughnecks	Luq Barcoo	CB	Brahmas	Matthew McCrane	K	Defenders	
5	Abram Smith	RB	Defenders	Pita Taumoepenu	OLB	Vipers	Darrius Shepherd (2)	WR	Battlehawks	
6	A. J. McCarron (2)	QB	Battlehawks	Jordan Williams	OLB	Brahmas	Kelvin McKnight	WR	Sea Dragons	
7	Quinten Dormady	QB	Guardians	Delontae Scott	DL	Brahmas	Fred Brown	WR	Brahmas	
8	Jordan Ta'amu	QB	Defenders	Will Clarke	DL	Renegades	Sterling Hofrichter	P	Battlehawks	
9	Ben DiNucci (2)	QB	Sea Dragons	Drew Beesley	DL	Brahmas	Mac Brown	P	Guardians	
10	A. J. McCarron (3)	QB	Battlehawks	Tavante Beckett	ILB	Roughnecks	Pooka Williams Jr.	RB	Defenders	
Division Championship	JaVonta Payton	WR	Renegades	Donald Payne	ILB	Renegades	Pooka Williams Jr. (2)	RB	Defenders	

=== Season awards ===
Season Awards
Award	Winner	Position	Team	Ref.
Coach of the Year	Reggie Barlow	HC	Defenders	
Most Valuable Player of the Year	A.J. McCarron	QB	Battlehawks	
Offensive Player of the Year	Jordan Ta'amu	QB	Defenders	
Defensive Player of the Year	Pita Taumoepenu	LB	Vipers	
Special Teams Player of the Year	Darrius Shepherd	WR/KR	Battlehawks	

All-XFL Team
Position	Player	Team
QB	Jordan Ta'amu	Defenders
RB	Abram Smith	Defenders
WR	Deontay Burnett	Roughnecks
WR	Hakeem Butler	Battlehawks
WR	Lucky Jackson	Defenders
WR	Jahcour Pearson	Sea Dragons
TE	Cody Latimer	Guardians
OT	Jaryd Jones-Smith	Battlehawks
OT	Colin Kelly	Sea Dragons
OG	Liam Fornadel	Defenders
OG	Steven Gonzalez	Battlehawks
C	Alex Mollette	Roughnecks
C	Mike Panasiuk	Battlehawks
DL	Drew Beesley	Brahmas
DL	Davin Bellamy	Defenders
DL	Austin Faoliu	Sea Dragons
DL	Jack Heflin	Roughnecks
DL	Davonte Lambert	Renegades
DL	Caeveon Patton	Guardians
DL	Delontae Scott	Brahmas
LB	Trent Harris	Roughnecks
LB	Pita Tamoepenu	Vipers
LB	Jordan Williams	Brahmas
DB	Deontay Anderson	Vipers
DB	Luq Barcoo	Brahmas
DB	Ajene Harris	Roughnecks
DB	Lavert Hill	Battlehawks
DB	Michael Joseph	Defenders
P	Daniel Whelan	Defenders
K	John Parker Romo	Brahmas
KR/PR	Darrius Shepherd	Battlehawks

== Statistical leaders ==
2023 XFL statistical leaders
Category	Player	Team	Stat
Offense
Passing yards	Ben DiNucci	Sea Dragons	2,671
Rushing yards	Abram Smith	Defenders	791
Receiving yards	Jahcour Pearson	Sea Dragons	670
Touchdowns	A. J. McCarron	Battlehawks	24
Defense
Tackles	Jordan Williams	Brahmas	51
Sacks	Trent Harris	Roughnecks	9.5
Interceptions	Ajene Harris	Roughnecks	5
Special teams
Return yards	Kelvin McKnight	Sea Dragons	235
Field goals made	John Parker Romo	Brahmas	17
Punting average	Brad Wing	Brahmas	47.9

== League finances ==
On August 3, 2020, it was reported that a consortium led by Dwayne "The Rock" Johnson, Dany Garcia, and Gerry Cardinale (through Cardinale's fund RedBird Capital Partners) purchased the XFL for $15 million (plus over $9.2 million in debts and payments) just hours before an auction could take place; the purchase received court approval on August 7, 2020. The XFL's parent company originally listed the league with assets and liabilities in the range of $10 million to $50 million.

On August 8, 2022, it was first reported that the XFL was looking for new equity investors in the league. The league has retained PJT Partners to help with the search and raise $125 million in equity funding, while new investors could own up to 45% of the XFL.

Forbes reported in June 2023 that the XFL had spent approximately $140 million in expenses over the course of the 2023 season and earned $80 million in gross revenue, roughly $20 million of which came from its broadcast contract with ESPN. The league estimated an increase in revenue to $100 million for the 2024 season and profitability by 2026. According to several reports, the XFL marketing budget was $120,000 for the 2023 season.

=== Business partnerships ===
The XFL had announced on the following "Official Partners": Under Armour as the league's official uniform and equipment partner, Ticketmaster the official ticketing partner, Westgate Resorts the official resort, Progressive as the official auto insurance sponsor, SMT as the official scoring and stats provider, Genius Sports as the official betting data distributor, BOLT6 as official instant replay partner, Ryzer as the official mindset testing partner and Teremana Tequila as the "league's official and exclusive tequila partner". The agreement with Under Armour would later expand, when the league announced an "expansive multi-year partnership".

The XFL also announced the following partnerships: Catapult Sports for performing technology, BreakAway Data for performance, training, recovery and player health data and Virtual Tables partnership to "incorporate their DigiSign product into the league's fan engagement offerings".

The league signed a three-year agreement with the city of Arlington, Texas, and Choctaw Stadium to be their centralized operations hub for preseason and in-week training for the league's eight teams.

Orlando Guardians signed a sponsorship agreement with "Miracle Toyota" dealership.

== Media ==
=== Broadcasting ===
In May 2022, the XFL announced it had signed an exclusive agreement with ESPN Inc. and The Walt Disney Company to carry every XFL game across ESPN's platforms, ABC, and FX. The deal runs through 2027 and worth between $100 million and $150 million. ESPN Inc. received an unspecified stake in the league as part of the contract, which Johnson confirmed carried a rights fee payment.

The league's schedule was released January 5, 2023. FX carried the majority of games through the first seven weeks of the season, including a marquee Saturday evening matchup most weeks during that time frame, with ESPN, ESPN2 and ABC assuming the full schedule from Week 8 onward. In all, FX carried 11 games total (down from the original 14 games), ESPN carried 12 regular season games (up from 10 previously), ESPN2 carried 9 regular season games (down from 10 previously), ABC carried 7 regular season games (up from 6 previously), FX and ESPN simulcasted one Week 1 regular season game, and ESPN aired both semi finals games and ABC aired the final (ESPN2 was originally scheduled to air a semifinal game but it was moved over to ESPN). The ESPN+ streaming service will stream all of the league's games, while ESPN3 will simulcast ABC games, ESPN's TV Everywhere service will carry games simulcast on ESPN and ESPN2, with FX NOW app simulcasting FX games. In January 2023, ESPN announced its commentator teams for the 2023 season. ESPN Deportes will broadcast 13 regular season game schedule (1 game each on most weeks), Along with all playoff games which will offer Spanish-language coverage of games aired and will be led by play-by-play commentator Rebeca Landa and analyst Sergio Dipp.

ESPN also hosted an XFL studio show called XFL Today during the season, with Jason Fitz, Skubie Mageza and Andrew Hawkins. The hosts replaced Jonathan Coachman, who declined to return after the money he was due for hosting the show in 2020 went unpaid in the league's bankruptcy.

The league announced via Twitter that radio broadcasts of XFL games would be carried on SiriusXM on ESPN Xtra radio. There will be no terrestrial radio broadcasts in teams' home markets, with the league stating that it had approached radio stations in each city but had found that none were able to accommodate their hometown teams due to existing commitments to other local teams.

==== Viewership ====
In millions of viewers

Broadcaster	1	2	3	4	5	6	7	8	9	10	Division finals	Championship game	Total	Average
ABC	1.6	–	–	–	–	1.1	–	1.0	0.9	0.8	–	1.4	9.1	1.1
ABC	1.5	–	–	–	–	0.8	–	–	–	–	–	–	9.1	1.1
ESPN	0.8	0.8	–	–	0.3	–	0.4	0.9	0.7	0.8	0.7	–	9.1	0.7
ESPN	1.0	–	–	–	–	–	0.5	0.7	0.6	0.4	0.5	–	9.1	0.7
ESPN2	–	0.7	0.5	0.6	0.3	0.4	0.4	0.5	0.2	0.4	–	–	4.7	0.5
ESPN2	–	–	–	0.7	–	–	–	–	–	–	–	–	4.7	0.5
FX	0.4	0.6	0.5	0.4	0.3	0.4	0.2	–	–	–	–	–	5.2	0.4
FX	–	0.6	0.7	0.3	0.2	–	–	–	–	–	–	–	5.2	0.4
FX	–	–	0.6	–	–	–	–	–	–	–	–	–	5.2	0.4
Total	5.3	2.7	2.3	2.0	1.1	2.7	1.5	3.1	2.4	2.4	1.2	1.4	28.1	
Average	1.1	0.7	0.6	0.5	0.3	0.7	0.4	0.8	0.6	0.6	0.6	1.4		0.7

* One decimal place is shown in table but three decimal places are used in all calculations.
* Viewership figures for games streaming on ESPN+ were not released.

==== International broadcasters ====
In Latin America, the 2023 season will be televised by ESPN and its streaming and on-demand platform Star+.

In Canada, the 2023 season will be broadcast in English solely online through TSN+, a new subscription over-the-top service being launched by TSN. Games carried on ABC will still be available on traditional television in portions of the country via antenna, cable and satellite systems.

In Germany, Austria, and Switzerland, the 2023 and 2024 seasons will be broadcast by Sport1 and its pay-TV channel Sport1+.

=== "Player 54" ===
On February the league and ESPN announced a collaboration on a new original nine-part docuseries directed by Peter Berg, called "Player 54: Chasing the XFL Dream", which "chronicles the building of the XFL and follows the unique stories of players and coaches throughout the inaugural season". The first episode, an encore of the episode airing at ABC (it originally aired on ESPN2), averaged 696,000 viewers. The show got mixed reviews, while some complained about the broadcasting schedule with minimal advertising from ESPN.

== Reception ==
The XFL's second return to play began with a game between the Vegas Vipers and Arlington Renegades on Saturday, February 18, 2023. The first week of games received tentative praise, with Bill Shea of The Athletic grading the return a B− in an article titled "I watched the XFL 3.0 so you don't have to (but you should!): The key takeaways." Also, the Battlehawks game against the Brahmas got international headlines, after come-from-behind improbable win for St. Louis that include a 3-point conversion.

However, TV ratings declined in comparison to the XFL's 2020 debut, as some blamed it on the league's promotional tactics. 1.54 million people watched the first game in 2023, down from the 3.3 million who watched the first game aired on ABC in 2020. Week 2's ratings again lagged as the games were the first to not air on broadcast television (as in 2020 at least two games aired on broadcast television each week).

After the Vegas Vipers' home opener many fans began to question the decision to play in Las Vegas, as a result of a local rainstorm causing the field condition in Cashman Field to be "unplayable" while the announced attendance of 6,023 people dwindled as the game progressed, with some calling it a "disaster of optics" after the field's dead grass had to be spray-painted green and others even went as far as calling it a "literal dump". XFL President Russ Brandon addressed the issue a day later, stating: "We have no concerns over the Vegas Vipers' field. They'll continue to work on it, the cosmetic side of it, but the field is sound."

On March 12, the St. Louis BattleHawks eclipsed their own previously set attendance record from 2020 with 38,310 spectators at their first home game of the season, a game against the Arlington Renegades.

In an interview with USA Today on March 27, Garcia and Johnson stated that they were very pleased with the execution of the league so far, and that there were already plans for a 2024 XFL football season. After the 2023 XFL Championship Game ESPN's vice president of programming and acquisitions, Tim Reed, expressed satisfaction with the viewership results.

== Signees to the NFL ==
NFL teams were permitted to request tryouts of XFL players beginning the day following a players’ club's last game of the season, including playoffs. NFL teams could also negotiate with the players, but were unable to sign the player until May 15, two days after the conclusion of the XFL championship game. XFL players were also eligible to attend NFL post-draft rookie minicamps on a tryout basis. Three players - Willie Taylor III, Harrison Frost and Marco Domio - were eligible for the 2023 NFL draft, but none were selected.

More than 200 players who played in the 2023 XFL season earned invitations to workout for NFL teams, while 63 of them signed contracts. One player (Daniel Whelan) started the 2023 NFL season on active 53-man NFL roster, one other player (Austin Faoliu) started the season on the PUP list, while 3 other players started the season on practice squad.

Legend
	Made an NFL team (active, practice squad or PUP)
**Bold**	Made the active roster

Note the following list notes the status of players as of August 29, 2023, the final day for NFL teams to make preseason cuts.

Player	Position	XFL team	Date	NFL team	Ref.
Ben DiNucci	QB	Seattle Sea Dragons	May 15	Denver Broncos	
Jacques Patrick	RB	San Antonio Brahmas	May 15	Denver Broncos/Tennessee Titans/New York Jets	
Barry Wesley	OT	Seattle Sea Dragons	May 15	Atlanta Falcons	
Luq Barcoo	CB	San Antonio Brahmas	May 15	Pittsburgh Steelers	
Bryce Thompson	S	Seattle Sea Dragons	May 15	Miami Dolphins	
Lukas Denis	S	St. Louis Battlehawks	May 15	Atlanta Falcons	
C. J. Brewer	DT	Houston Roughnecks	May 15	Tampa Bay Buccaneers	
**LaCale London**	DT	St. Louis Battlehawks	May 15	Atlanta Falcons	
**Jack Heflin**	DT	Houston Roughnecks	May 15	New Orleans Saints	
**John Parker Romo**	K	San Antonio Brahmas	May 15	Detroit Lions/Chicago Bears/Atlanta Falcons	
Niko Lalos	DE	Seattle Sea Dragons	May 15	New Orleans Saints	
Austin Faoliu	DL	Seattle Sea Dragons	May 15	Seattle Seahawks	
Antwuan Jackson	DL	Seattle Sea Dragons	May 15	Carolina Panthers	
Jordan Thomas	TE/LB	Orlando Guardians	May 16	Carolina Panthers	
Gary Jennings	WR	St. Louis Battlehawks	May 16	Carolina Panthers	
Jaryd Jones-Smith	OT	St. Louis Battlehawks	May 16	Washington Commanders	
Charleston Rambo	WR	Orlando Guardians	May 16	Philadelphia Eagles	
Hakeem Butler	WR	St. Louis Battlehawks	May 16	Pittsburgh Steelers	
Alize Mack	TE	San Antonio Brahmas	May 17	Tennessee Titans	
Willie Taylor III	LB	Arlington Renegades	May 17	Jacksonville Jaguars	
**Daniel Whelan**	P	DC Defenders	May 17	Green Bay Packers	
Ferrod Gardner	LB	DC Defenders	May 22	Washington Commanders	
**Lucky Jackson**	WR	DC Defenders	May 23	Minnesota Vikings	
Brandon Dillon	TE	Vegas Vipers	May 30	Washington Commanders	
Marcell Ateman	WR	St. Louis Battlehawks	June 1	Buffalo Bills	
Darrius Shepherd	WR	St. Louis Battlehawks	June 1	Los Angeles Chargers	
Brandon Smith	WR	DC Defenders	June 12	Arizona Cardinals	
Kobe Smith	DE	San Antonio Brahmas	June 16	New York Giants	
**Chris Blair**	WR	DC Defenders	June 16	Atlanta Falcons	
Rex Sunahara	LS	San Antonio Brahmas	June 19	Pittsburgh Steelers	
Darren Evans	CB	Arlington Renegades	July 18	New York Giants	
Jack Snyder	OG	Houston Roughnecks	July 24	Minnesota Vikings	
Kevin Atkins	DT	St. Louis Battlehawks	July 26	New York Giants	
**Michael Bandy**	WR	Houston Roughnecks	July 28	Denver Broncos	
Reid Sinnett	QB	San Antonio Brahmas	July 29	Cincinnati Bengals	
John Lovett	RB	Vegas Vipers	July 31	Pittsburgh Steelers	
Liam Ryan	OT	DC Defenders	July 31	Seattle Seahawks	
Mike Rose	ILB	St. Louis Battlehawks	August 3	Miami Dolphins	
Caeveon Patton	DT	Orlando Guardians	August 3	Atlanta Falcons	
Mathew Sexton	WR	Vegas Vipers	August 3	Atlanta Falcons/New England Patriots/Miami Dolphins	
Matthew Gotel	DT	San Antonio Brahmas	August 3	Atlanta Falcons/Seattle Seahawks	
Michal Menet	C	Seattle Sea Dragons	August 3	Atlanta Falcons	
Abram Smith	RB	DC Defenders	August 3	Minnesota Vikings	
Derrick Kelly	OG	San Antonio Brahmas	August 4	Cleveland Browns	
Jontre Kirklin	WR	Houston Roughnecks	August 5	New Orleans Saints	
Charles Wiley	OLB	Houston Roughnecks	August 7	Cleveland Browns	
**Bruce Hector**	DT	Arlington Renegades	August 7	New York Jets/Houston Texans	
Pita Taumoepenu	OLB	Vegas Vipers	August 7	New York Jets	
Nate Meadors	S	St. Louis Battlehawks	August 12	Cleveland Browns/Pittsburgh Steelers	
Victor Bolden	WR	Arlington Renegades	August 12	Houston Texans	
Alex Mollette	C	Houston Roughnecks	August 14	Detroit Lions	
Carson Wells	LB	St. Louis Battlehawks	August 14	New England Patriots	
Lavert Hill	CB	St. Louis Battlehawks	August 14	Pittsburgh Steelers	
Delontae Scott	DE	San Antonio Brahmas	August 15	Atlanta Falcons	
Tomasi Laulile	DE	Arlington Renegades	August 18	San Francisco 49ers/Denver Broncos	
Jordan Ta'amu	QB	DC Defenders	August 18	Minnesota Vikings	
Garrett McGhin	OG	Arlington Renegades	August 20	Buffalo Bills	
Brian Hill	RB	St. Louis Battlehawks	August 21	San Francisco 49ers	
Elijah Hamilton	CB	St. Louis Battlehawks	August 21	Green Bay Packers	
Sal Cannella	TE	Arlington Renegades	August 21	Seattle Seahawks	
Juwan Green	WR	Seattle Sea Dragons	August 21	Kansas City Chiefs	
Josh Hammond	WR	DC Defenders	August 21	Denver Broncos	
Doug Costin	DT	Arlington Renegades	August 21	Las Vegas Raiders	
**A. J. McCarron**	QB	St. Louis Battlehawks	September 23	Cincinnati Bengals	
**Brad Wing**	P	San Antonio Brahmas	September 27	Pittsburgh Steelers	
Martavis Bryant	WR	Vegas Vipers	November 7	Dallas Cowboys	
Drew Plitt	QB	Arlington Renegades	November 20	Cincinnati Bengals	
Alex Matheson	LS	St. Louis Battlehawks	December 26	Los Angeles Rams	

== See also ==
- 2023 USFL season
