= Pita Taumoepenu =

American football player (born 1994)

- Taumoepenu holding his 2025 UFL Defensive Player of the Year award football

No. 55, 52, 57, 7
- Position: Linebacker

Personal information
- Born: March 9, 1994 (age 32); Euless, Texas, U.S.
- Listed height: 6 ft 2 in (1.88 m)
- Listed weight: 250 lb (113 kg)

Career information
- High school: Timpview (Provo, Utah)
- College: Utah
- NFL draft: 2017: 6th round, 202nd overall pick

Career history
- San Francisco 49ers (2017–2019); Arizona Cardinals (2019); Seattle Seahawks (2019–2020); Atlanta Falcons (2020); Denver Broncos (2021–2022); Vegas Vipers (2023); New York Jets (2023); St. Louis Battlehawks (2024–2026)

Awards and highlights
- UFL Defensive Player of the Year (2025); All-UFL Team (2025); UFL sack leader (2025); XFL Defensive Player of the Year (2023); All-XFL Team (2023); XFL forced fumbles leader (2023)
- Stats at Pro Football Reference

Pita Taumoepenu (born March 9, 1994) is an American former professional football linebacker. He played college football at Utah. He was selected by the San Francisco 49ers in the sixth round of the 2017 NFL draft.

== Professional career ==
=== Pre-draft ===
Coming out of Utah, Taumoepenu was ranked as the 28th best outside linebacker prospect by CBS Sports. On October 4, 2016, it was announced Taumoepenu had received an invitation to play in the NFLPA Collegiate Bowl. On January 21, 2017, Taumoepenu attended the NFLPA Collegiate Bowl and recorded four solo tackles and one sack as a part of Jim Zorn's American team who lost 27–7 to Mike Martz's National. He was one of eight Utah players invited to the NFL Scouting Combine in Indianapolis, Indiana. He completed the majority of combine drills and finished second amongst all the defensive lineman in the 40-yard dash and the three-cone drill, only behind Kansas State's Jordan Willis, and finished sixth in the short shuttle. On March 23, 2017, Taumoepenu attended Utah's pro day and performed the majority of combine drills. He attended a private meeting with Pittsburgh Steelers. At the conclusion of the pre-draft process, Taumoepenu was projected to be a seventh round pick or priority undrafted free agent. He was ranked the 29th best outside linebacker prospect by NFLDraftScout.com.

Pre-draft measurables
Height	Weight	Arm length	Hand span	Wingspan	40-yard dash	10-yard split	20-yard split	20-yard shuttle	Three-cone drill	Vertical jump	Broad jump	Bench press
6 ft 1 1/4 in (1.86 m)	243 lb (110 kg)	32 3/8 in (0.82 m)	9 7/8 in (0.25 m)	6 ft 5 3/8 in (1.97 m)	4.67 s	1.65 s	2.73 s	4.33 s	6.91 s	29.5 in (0.75 m)	9 ft 4 in (2.84 m)	24 reps
All values from NFL Combine/Pro Day

=== San Francisco 49ers ===
The San Francisco 49ers selected Taumoepenu in the sixth round (202nd overall) of the 2017 NFL draft. The 49ers previously acquired the pick used to select Taumoepenu in a trade with the Denver Broncos in a trade that sent Vernon Davis to the Broncos. On May 4, 2017, the 49ers signed him to a four-year, $2.54 million contract that included a signing bonus of $145,444.

Throughout training camp, he competed for a roster spot against Brock Coyle, Eli Harold, Ray-Ray Armstrong, Dekoda Watson, and Jimmie Gilbert. Head coach Kyle Shanahan named him the third strongside linebacker to begin the season, behind Harold and Watson. On September 1, 2018, Taumoepenu was waived by the 49ers and was signed to the practice squad the next day. On December 5, Taumoepenu was promoted to the active roster.

On May 28, 2019, Taumoepenu was waived by the 49ers.

=== Arizona Cardinals ===
On May 29, 2019, Taumoepenu was claimed off waivers by the Arizona Cardinals. He was waived/injured during final roster cuts on August 31, and reverted to the team's injured reserve list the next day. Taumoepenu was waived from injured reserve with an injury settlement on September 10.

=== Seattle Seahawks ===
On November 20, 2019, Taumoepenu was signed to the Seattle Seahawks' practice squad. He signed a reserve/future contract with the Seahawks on January 14, 2020. Taumoepenu was waived on May 4, but rejoined the team on August 30. He was waived again four days later.

=== Atlanta Falcons ===
On October 20, 2020, Taumoepenu was signed to the Atlanta Falcons' practice squad. He was elevated to the active roster on November 7 for the team's Week 9 game against the Denver Broncos, and reverted to the practice squad after the game. Taumoepenu's practice squad contract with the team expired after the season on January 11, 2021.

=== Denver Broncos ===
On May 17, 2021, Taumoepenu signed with the Denver Broncos. He was released by Denver on August 23. Taumoepenu re-signed with the team's practice squad on September 22. He was released by the Broncos on January 5, 2022.

=== Vegas Vipers ===
Taumoepenu was drafted by the Vegas Vipers of the XFL in the 2023 XFL draft. On May 4, 2023, Taumoepenu was named the inaugural XFL Defensive Player of the Year. He was released from his contract on August 7.

=== New York Jets ===
On August 8, 2023, Taumoepenu signed with the New York Jets. He was released by the Jets on August 28.

=== St. Louis Battlehawks ===
The St. Louis Battlehawks of the XFL signed Taumoepenu on December 23, 2023. He re-signed with the team on October 18, 2024. Taumoepenu finished the 2025 UFL season with the most sacks and was named to the All-UFL Team.

On November 11, 2026, he announced his retirement from football.

== NFL statistics ==
Year	Team	Games		Tackles				Interceptions						Fumbles	
Year	Team	GP	GS	Comb	Solo	Ast	Sck	PD	Int	Yds	Avg	Lng	TDs	FF	FR
2017	SF	2	0	0	0	0	0.0	0	0	0	0	0	0	0	0
2018	SF	4	0	3	3	0	0.0	0	0	0	0	0	0	0	0
2019	ARI	0	0	0	0	0	0.0	0	0	0	0	0	0	0	0
2020	ATL	1	0	2	2	0	0.0	0	0	0	0	0	0	0	0
Career		7	0	5	5	0	0	0	0	0	0	0	0	0	0
