= Quinten Dormady =

American football player (born 1996)

No. 12
- Position: Quarterback

Personal information
- Born: February 19, 1996 (age 30); West Union, Iowa, U.S.
- Listed height: 6 ft 5 in (1.96 m)
- Listed weight: 219 lb (99 kg)

Career information
- High school: Boerne (Boerne, Texas)
- College: Tennessee (2015–2017); Houston (2018); Central Michigan (2019)
- NFL draft: 2020: undrafted

Career history
- Montreal Alouettes (2021)*; Orlando Guardians (2023); San Antonio Brahmas (2024); Memphis Showboats (2025)*
- * Offseason or practice squad member only

Career UFL statistics
- Passing attempts: 173
- Passing completions: 103
- Completion percentage: 59.8
- TD–INT: 6–6
- Passing yards: 1,206
- Passer rating: 77.9

Quinten Michael Dormady (born February 19, 1996) is an American former professional football quarterback. He played college football for Tennessee, Houston, and Central Michigan. He played professionally for the Orlando Guardians of the XFL and the San Antonio Brahmas of the United Football League (UFL). Dormady was also on the practice roster of the Montreal Alouettes of the Canadian Football League (CFL).

== Early life ==
Dormady was born on February 19, 1996, in West Union, Iowa. He attended, played football, and baseball for Boerne High School in Boerne, Texas, where he played football for his father, Mike.

As a sophomore in 2012, he threw for 3,010 yards and 27 touchdowns and was named an honorable mention All-State. He missed his junior year with a torn labrum.

As a senior in 2014, he threw for 2,893 yards and 32 touchdowns and led the team to an 8–3 record and a playoff berth. He threw for 409 yards in the season opener.

College recruiting
Name	Hometown	School	Height	Weight	Commit date
Quinten Dormady; QB	Boerne, Texas	Boerne High School	6 ft 4 in (1.93 m)	216 lb (98 kg)	Jun 10, 2014
Quinten Dormady; QB	Recruit ratings: Scout: Rivals: 247Sports: ESPN:				
Overall recruit ranking: 247Sports: 271
Note: In many cases, Scout, Rivals, 247Sports, On3, and ESPN may conflict in their listings of height and weight.; In these cases, the average was taken. ESPN grades are on a 100-point scale.; Sources: "2015 Team Ranking". Rivals.com.

== College career ==
=== Tennessee ===
Dormady committed to Tennessee in 2014. As a true freshman in 2015, he made his college football debut in the season opener against Bowling Green. He played in six games on the year against Bowling Green, Western Carolina, North Texas, Vanderbilt and in the team's Outback Bowl appearance against Northwestern, in which they won by 3 scores or more in every contest. He threw his first-career touchdown pass to Preston Williams against Western Carolina. He finished the game going six of eight for 93 yards.

Dormady's role diminished in 2016 in his sophomore year as he only appeared in four games. He made his season debut in the team's win over Virginia Tech in the Battle at Bristol. He threw his season-long 36-yard pass against Alabama when he came in relief in the fourth quarter, where they lost 49-10 at home. He played the most against Tennessee Tech as he came off the bench and finished nine of thirteen for 109 yards.

Entering 2017, he was named the starter. In the first week of the season he and John Kelly Jr. led the Volunteers past Georgia Tech in a 42–41 double-overtime win, where he passed for 221 yards and two touchdowns. The following week against FCS opponent Indiana State he again had two touchdown passes. The team would lose at No. 24 Florida 26-20 as Dormady threw for 259 yards, but he threw for 3 interceptions. After a close victory versus UMass, he would struggle in a shutout home loss to Georgia and would be shut down for the season after battling a shoulder injury caused prior to the team's loss to Florida. Following the season Dormady announced that he was going to transfer from the team.

=== Houston ===
In 2018, Dormady transferred to Houston. Due to his injury sustained the previous season he only played in one game for the Cougars. He debuted against Arizona as he threw for eight yards in the team's win. He redshirted and transferred after the season.

=== Central Michigan ===
In 2019, Dormady transferred to Central Michigan. He started in all ten games he played in for the Chippewas. He made his debut against Albany where he threw for 285 yards and three touchdowns. After losing at No. 17 Wisconsin 61-0, Dormady missed the next four games with an injury. He threw for multiple touchdowns against New Mexico State in his return from injury, Buffalo, and Northern Illinois. Against Ball State he threw a season-high 365 yards and led a 17-point second-half comeback, in which they trailed 34-17 midway through the third quarter. Against Miami of Ohio he threw for 232 yards and a touchdown in the MAC Championship Game loss, 26-21. Central Michigan earned a bid in the New Mexico Bowl where they faced San Diego State. In the final game of his career he went 11 of 26 for 164 yards and three interceptions as the team lost 48-11.

=== Statistics ===
Year	Team	Games			Passing								Rushing			
Year	Team	GP	GS	Record	Comp	Att	Pct	Yards	Avg	TD	Int	Rate	Att	Yards	Avg	TD
2015	Tennessee	6	0	0–0	13	22	59.1	209	9.5	1	0	153.9	10	5	0.5	0
2016	Tennessee	4	0	0–0	11	17	64.7	148	8.7	0	0	137.8	1	3	3.0	0
2017	Tennessee	6	5	3–2	76	137	55.5	925	6.8	6	6	117.9	11	13	1.2	0
2018	Houston	1	0	0–0	2	5	40.0	8	1.6	0	0	53.4	0	0	0.0	0
2019	Central Michigan	10	10	6–4	190	294	64.6	2,312	7.9	14	9	140.3	35	−39	−1.1	0
Career		27	15	9–6	292	475	61.5	3,602	7.6	21	15	133.4	57	-18	-0.3	0

== Professional career ==
Pre-draft measurables
Height	Weight	Arm length	Hand span
6 ft 4 3/4 in (1.95 m)	215 lb (98 kg)	34 1/4 in (0.87 m)	9 3/8 in (0.24 m)
All values from the Central Michigan Pro Day

=== Montreal Alouettes ===
On December 15, 2020, Dormady signed with the Montreal Alouettes of the Canadian Football League (CFL) but was cut before training camp in 2021. On October 14, 2021, due to injuries he was brought back by the Alouettes and assigned to the practice roster following a try-out with the Green Bay Packers of the National Football League (NFL).

On May 9, 2022, Dormady was released in the first training camp cuts.

=== Orlando Guardians ===
On November 16, 2022, Dormady was assigned to the Orlando Guardians of the XFL. He made his debut in the XFL late in the fourth quarter in reserve for starter Paxton Lynch. He threw a 51-yard touchdown pass to Andrew Jamiel to score the second, and final, touchdown of the game for the Guardians.

He was released on March 3, 2023, after allegedly giving a rival team plays from the Guardians' playbook. He was reinstated a day later, on March 4, 2023, when the league released a statement saying they would be investigating into the situation. He was subsequently placed on the team's reserve list. After undergoing a third-party investigation, it was found that there was no substantial proof behind the allegations, and Dormady was added back to the active roster. Dormady would later claim that the XFL, despite exonerating Dormady, still deducted a $5,000 fine from his pay for the incident. He made his first career start on March 25, 2023, against the Seattle Sea Dragons after a 0–5 start under Lynch. In the game he completed 24 of 44 passes for 243 yards alongside five rushes for 43 yards. Despite a turnover-free game from Dormady, the Guardians could not break the twenty-point threshold and fell to the Sea Dragons 19–26.

The following week on April 1, 2023, Dormady was once again named the starter as the 0–6 Guardians played the 6–0 DC Defenders. After Jordan Ta'amu led the Defenders to a touchdown on their first possession, Dormady responded with a six-play 45-yard touchdown drive of his own which was capped off by his first rushing touchdown on a one-yard quarterback sneak. Following a punt by DC he once again led a scoring drive, this time hitting KD Cannon for a 41-yard touchdown pass to put the Guardians up 12–8. After two touchdowns from the Defenders, Dormady earned his second rushing touchdown of the game with three seconds left in the first half to make the game closer at 18–22. After trading punts, he led the team to a nine-play 46-yard touchdown drive that ended with a fifteen-yard touchdown catch from tight end Jordan Thomas to go up 25–22 over the undefeated Defenders. After an 86-yard touchdown pass from Ta'amu to Chris Blair, Dormady responded and scored his third rushing touchdown of the game bringing his game total of touchdowns to five. DC scored early in the fourth, but a 44-yard touchdown to Cody Latimer would put the Guardians up 37–36 and a few defensive stops would seal the upset for the winless Orlando team. Dormady finished the game with 328 yards on 27 of 34 attempts and three touchdowns. On the ground he also ran for 22 yards on eight attempts and three touchdowns; ending with six touchdowns in total. The Guardians folded when the XFL and USFL merged to create the United Football League (UFL).

=== San Antonio Brahmas ===
On January 15, 2024, Dormady was selected by the San Antonio Brahmas with the first selection in the Super Draft portion of the 2024 UFL dispersal draft. He signed with the team on February 1. Heading into week four, Dormady was named starting quarterback after starter Chase Garbers was placed on injured reserve. Dormady re-signed with the Brahmas on October 24.

=== Memphis Showboats and retirement ===
Dormady was traded to the Memphis Showboats in exchange for linebacker Jordan Ferguson on October 24, 2024. He was released on March 8, 2025.

Dormady was active in the United Football Players Association and helped orchestrate a mini-strike against the UFL's quarterback minicamp prior to the 2025 season; he alleged that his involvement in the UFPA's aggressive negotiating stance toward the league, during a period where the two parties were negotiating a new collective bargaining agreement, factored into the league's decision to release him, and that he did not get a substantial chance to prove himself due to the time in training camp that he had been given being compromised by poor weather limiting all the quarterbacks' performances. Dormady stated he would not play professional football again.

On October 10, 2025, the San Francisco 49ers worked out Dormady amid an injury to starter Brock Purdy.

== Career statistics ==
Legend
**Bold**	Career best

Year	League	Team	Games		Passing								Rushing			
Year	League	Team	GP	GS	Cmp	Att	Pct	Yds	Y/A	TD	Int	Rtg	Att	Yds	Avg	TD
2023	XFL	ORL	**7**	**4**	**140**	**205**	**68.3**	**1,507**	**7.4**	**10**	5	**95.7**	**25**	**97**	**3.9**	**4**
2024	UFL	SA	4	2	103	173	59.8	1,206	7.0	6	**6**	77.9	15	54	3.6	0
Career			11	6	243	378	64.3	2,713	7.2	16	11	87.5	40	151	3.9	4

== Personal life ==
Dormady is the son of Mike and Lisa Dormady. His father, Mike, coached his high school football team.
