= Jaryd Jones-Smith =

American football player (born 1995)

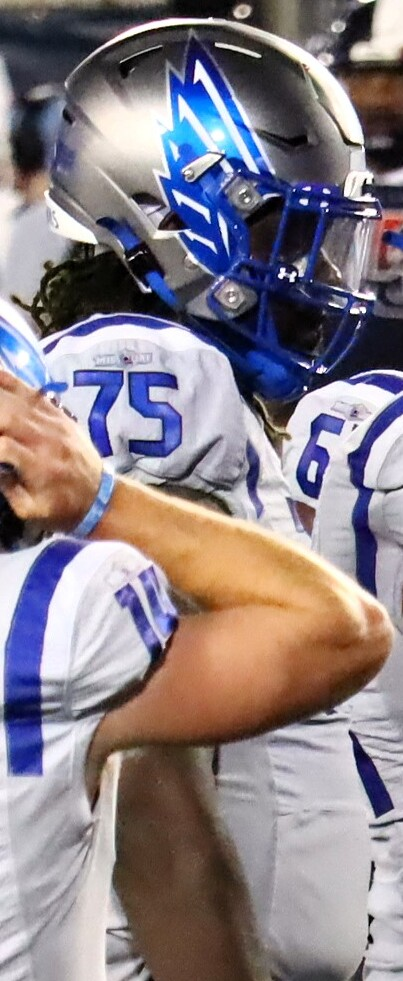
- Jones-Smith in 2025

No. 72, 61
- Position: Offensive tackle

Personal information
- Born: September 3, 1995 (age 31); Camden, New Jersey, U.S.
- Listed height: 6 ft 7 in (2.01 m)
- Listed weight: 320 lb (145 kg)

Career information
- High school: West Catholic Prep (Philadelphia, Pennsylvania)
- College: Pittsburgh (2013–2017)
- NFL draft: 2018: undrafted

Career history
- Houston Texans (2018)*; San Antonio Commanders (2019); Miami Dolphins (2019)*; San Francisco 49ers (2019–2020)*; Las Vegas Raiders (2020); Baltimore Ravens (2021); St. Louis BattleHawks (2023); Washington Commanders (2023)*; St. Louis BattleHawks (2024); Atlanta Falcons (2024)*; St. Louis Battlehawks (2025)
- * Offseason or practice squad member only

Awards and highlights
- All-UFL Team (2024); All-XFL Team (2023)

Career NFL statistics
- Games played: 6
- Stats at Pro Football Reference

Jaryd Emanuel Jones-Smith (born September 3, 1995) is an American former professional football player who was an offensive tackle in the National Football League (NFL). He played college football for the Pittsburgh Panthers. He also played professionally in the Alliance of American Football (AAF), XFL, and United Football League (UFL).

== Professional career ==
Pre-draft measurables
Height	Weight	Arm length	Hand span	Wingspan	40-yard dash	10-yard split	20-yard split	20-yard shuttle	Three-cone drill	Vertical jump	Broad jump	Bench press
6 ft 6 1/2 in (1.99 m)	317 lb (144 kg)	36 1/4 in (0.92 m)	10 in (0.25 m)	7 ft 4 1/2 in (2.25 m)	5.22 s	1.77 s	3.00 s	4.94 s	8.10 s	27.0 in (0.69 m)	9 ft 1 in (2.77 m)	20 reps
All values from NFL Combine/Pro Day

=== Houston Texans ===
Jones-Smith signed with the Houston Texans as an undrafted free agent following the 2018 NFL draft on May 11, 2020. He was waived during final roster cuts on September 1, 2018.

=== San Antonio Commanders ===
Jones-Smith signed with the San Antonio Commanders of the Alliance of American Football (AAF) in 2019. He played in all eight games during the 2019 AAF season before the league folded in April 2019.

=== Miami Dolphins ===
After the AAF suspended football operations, Jones-Smith signed with the Miami Dolphins on April 9, 2019. He was waived during final roster cuts on August 31, 2019.

=== San Francisco 49ers ===
Jones-Smith signed to the practice squad of the San Francisco 49ers on October 1, 2019. He re-signed with the 49ers after the 2019 NFL season on February 10, 2020. He was waived during final roster cuts on September 5, 2020.

=== Las Vegas Raiders ===
Jones-Smith signed to the Las Vegas Raiders' practice squad on September 8, 2020. He was elevated to the active roster on November 7, November 14, and November 22 for the team's weeks 9, 10, and 11 games against the Los Angeles Chargers, Denver Broncos, and Kansas City Chiefs, and reverted to the practice squad after each game. He signed a reserve/future contract on January 5, 2021.

On August 31, 2021, Jones-Smith was waived by the Raiders.

=== Baltimore Ravens ===
On September 21, 2021, Jones-Smith signed with the Baltimore Ravens practice squad. He was released on November 16, 2021, but re-signed on November 23, 2021. He signed a reserve/future contract with the Ravens on January 10, 2022. He was waived on August 23, 2022.

=== St. Louis BattleHawks ===
On November 17, 2022, Jones-Smith was selected by the St. Louis BattleHawks of the XFL. He was named to the All-XFL team at offensive line. He was released from his contract on May 15, 2023.

=== Washington Commanders ===
Jones-Smith signed with the Washington Commanders on May 16, 2023. He was waived on August 29, 2023, and re-signed to the practice squad. He became a free agent when his practice squad contract expired after the season.

=== St. Louis Battlehawks (second stint) ===
On February 15, 2024, Jones-Smith re-signed with the St. Louis Battlehawks. He was named to the 2024 All-UFL team on June 5, 2024. His contract with the team was terminated on June 17, 2024 to sign with an NFL team.

=== Atlanta Falcons ===
On June 20, 2024, Jones-Smith signed with the Atlanta Falcons. He was waived on August 25.

=== St. Louis Battlehawks (third stint) ===
On November 29, 2024, Jones-Smith re-signed with the Battlehawks.

=== Houston Gamblers ===
On January 13, 2026, Jones-Smith was selected by the Houston Gamblers in the 2026 UFL Draft.

Despite being drafted by the Gamblers, Jones-Smith had announced his intention to retire from professional football.

=== NFL career statistics ===
Year	Team	Games	Starts
2020	LV	3	3
2021	BAL	1	1
Career		4	4
