= Harry Marino =

American attorney

Harrison Louis Marino (born July 14, 1990) is an American attorney, workers' rights advocate, and former minor league baseball player. He led the effort to organize a minor league baseball players' union and helped negotiate the players' first collective bargaining agreement.

== Education ==
Marino earned a Bachelor of Arts from Williams College, where he double majored in Political Science and English and concentrated in Legal Studies, and a Juris Doctor from the University of Virginia School of Law. In 2011, he played collegiate summer baseball with the Chatham Anglers of the Cape Cod Baseball League.

== Career ==
Marino spent three seasons in the Arizona Diamondbacks and Baltimore Orioles organizations and pitched for five different minor league teams: the Delmarva Shorebirds, Aberdeen Ironbirds, Arizona Complex League Diamondbacks, Quebec Capitales, and Joliet Slammers. Marino has stated he experienced substandard working conditions as a minor league baseball player. He was the Executive Director of Advocates for Minor Leaguers, a non-profit labor advocacy organization.

Marino served as a law clerk to Karen LeCraft Henderson of the United States Court of Appeals for the District of Columbia Circuit and J. Frederick Motz of the United States District Court for the District of Maryland. He practiced law at Williams & Connolly LLP before joining Advocates for Minor Leaguers and later served as Assistant General Counsel of the Major League Baseball Players Association.

Marino served as lead negotiator for the United Football Players Association during its negotiations with the United Football League prior to and during the 2025 UFL season. Marino successfully negotiated a new collective bargaining agreement between the two sides that the UFPA ratified April 18, 2025, and indicated an intent to shift the relationship between the two entities, which had grown increasingly hostile during negotiations after the UFPA had taken over from the United Steelworkers, toward a more collaborative effort in hopes of ensuring that the historically unstable and unprofitable business of spring football would have a long-term future.
