= United Football Players Association =

American labor union

- Abbreviation: UFPA
- Formation: 2020; 6 years ago
- Type: nonprofit organization
- Legal status: 501(c)(4) organization
- Location: United States
- Members: 1,800
- President: Kenneth Farrow II; Nick Temple
- Board Executive: Ryan Cave; Don Povia
- Affiliations: None (formerly United Steelworkers)
- Website: ufpaunion.org

The United Football Players Association, or U.F.P.A., is a nonprofit organization representing American professional football players outside of the National Football League and Canadian Football League. The UFPA is led by presidents Kenneth Farrow II and Nick Temple and Board Executives Ryan Cave and Don Povia.

Founded in 2020, after the XFL bankruptcy, to become a "collective voice for professional players in potential leagues who are not covered by contracts like those in the National Football League Players Association or the Canadian Football League Players' Association and in order to avoid more negative situations similar to those that followed the bankruptcies of the XFL and Alliance of American Football".

The UFPA was not, at the time of its launch, a legal union. Instead, it was billed as an advisory organization that is meant to advise players and advocate leagues on behalf of players, especially in the realms of pay scales, schedules, safety protocols and legal concerns. In 2022 the union announced its affiliation with the United Steelworkers in order to negotiate a collective bargaining agreement (CBA) with the United States Football League. The CBA between the league and the players was signed on January 9, 2023. After a contentious falling out with the USW in 2024, the UFPA became a legal union when the United Football League players ratified the UFPA to serve as their union in November of that year.

== Background ==
There have been professional football leagues of varying levels since the invention of the sport, but all of them acted as "independent" (or "alternative") leagues after the NFL severed ties with all minor league teams in 1948 and again with the cancellation of NFL Europe in 2006, while players were provided with no formal representation and received few, if any, benefits.

After the Alliance of American Football infamously shut down mid-season in 2019, leaving open medical bills while some players to find their own flights home, and the XFL too shut down mid-season, because of the COVID-19 pandemic, players were left without much recourse after the league's bankruptcy filing. Those two events lead to formation of a player advocacy group, led by Kenneth Farrow II, aimed at representing non-NFL and non-CFL player interests in startup leagues like upstart spring leagues, indoor leagues and international leagues.

== History ==
The union was created in October 2020 and led by Kenneth Farrow II as a 501(c)4 nonprofit organization. The organization first action was to warn prospective players from signing with the National Gridiron League, after number of cases in the past have raised questions about whether this is a legitimate league or a scam. They also helped players who wanted to participate in the newly formed European League of Football.

In May, 2022 the organization contacted players from the newly formed United States Football League in attempt unionize, with a petition to represent the approximately 360 USFL players was later filed at the National Labor Relations Board (NLRB). The UFPA would later join forces with the United Steelworkers as the players union representation on behalf the USFL players, after a failed attempt to get representation from the NFLPA. On December 15, 2022, the UFPA, United Steelworkers and the league parent company FOX Sports tentatively agreed on a new three-year collective bargaining agreement starting at the 2023 season. The agreement was approved by the union members on January 9, 2023.

On March 10, 2023 XFL players (among them Farrow, who had signed with the Arlington Renegades that season) have filed a petition (through the United Steelworkers) for a representation election with Region 16 of the NLRB, with the backing of the AFL-CIO Sports Council. On April 19, the XFL players decided against joining the union by vote of 124 to 73.

By December 2023, the UFPA cancelled the partnership with the United Steelworkers (USW) and the USFL Players Association over disagreements stemming from the USFL's merger with the XFL, while the UFPA will start the process of being recognized as an official union. The USFLPA followed with a statement claiming that the UFPA had never been directly involved with any of the negotiations and were not authorized to speak on behalf of the USFLPA. The newly merged United Football League later announced that the newly formed UFLPA (through the USW) would be the recognized as the exclusive bargaining representative by the UFL. After the USW and UFLPA parted ways in August 2024, the UFLPA issued a statement warning its members that it preferred affiliating with an established union and to pursue a "confidential background check on any newly organized union posing as 'united'(.)" Despite this warning, on October 12, the UFPA issued a statement claiming the UFL players had ratified an agreement establishing the UFPA as their union, and that the National Labor Relations Board (NLRB) had recognized the vote. Within four months, the UFPA had declared the previous CBA between the UFL and USW "unacceptable and disgusting" and triggered an impasse with the UFL, threatening the 2025 UFL season. Quarterback Quinten Dormady revealed himself as one of the major advocates of the UFPA within the UFL player rosters and blamed the UFL for using that position against him when he was released on March 8, 2025. On April 18, 2025, the UFPA announced it had ratified a new collective bargaining agreement raising pay to $6,200 per game (up from the $5,500 per game under the previous agreement) and $6,400 per game in 2026, and an extension of health insurance coverage from the previous four months to seven months, and the remaining five months being covered by giving the players access under COBRA. The agreement will expire following the end of the 2026 season. The deal was brokered by Harry Marino, the UFPA's lead negotiator.

== Presidents ==
The presidents of the United Football Players Association are:

- Kenneth Farrow and Nick Temple, 2020–present

== See also ==
- National Football League Players Association
- Canadian Football League Players' Association
