= Trent Harris (American football) =

American football player (born 1995)

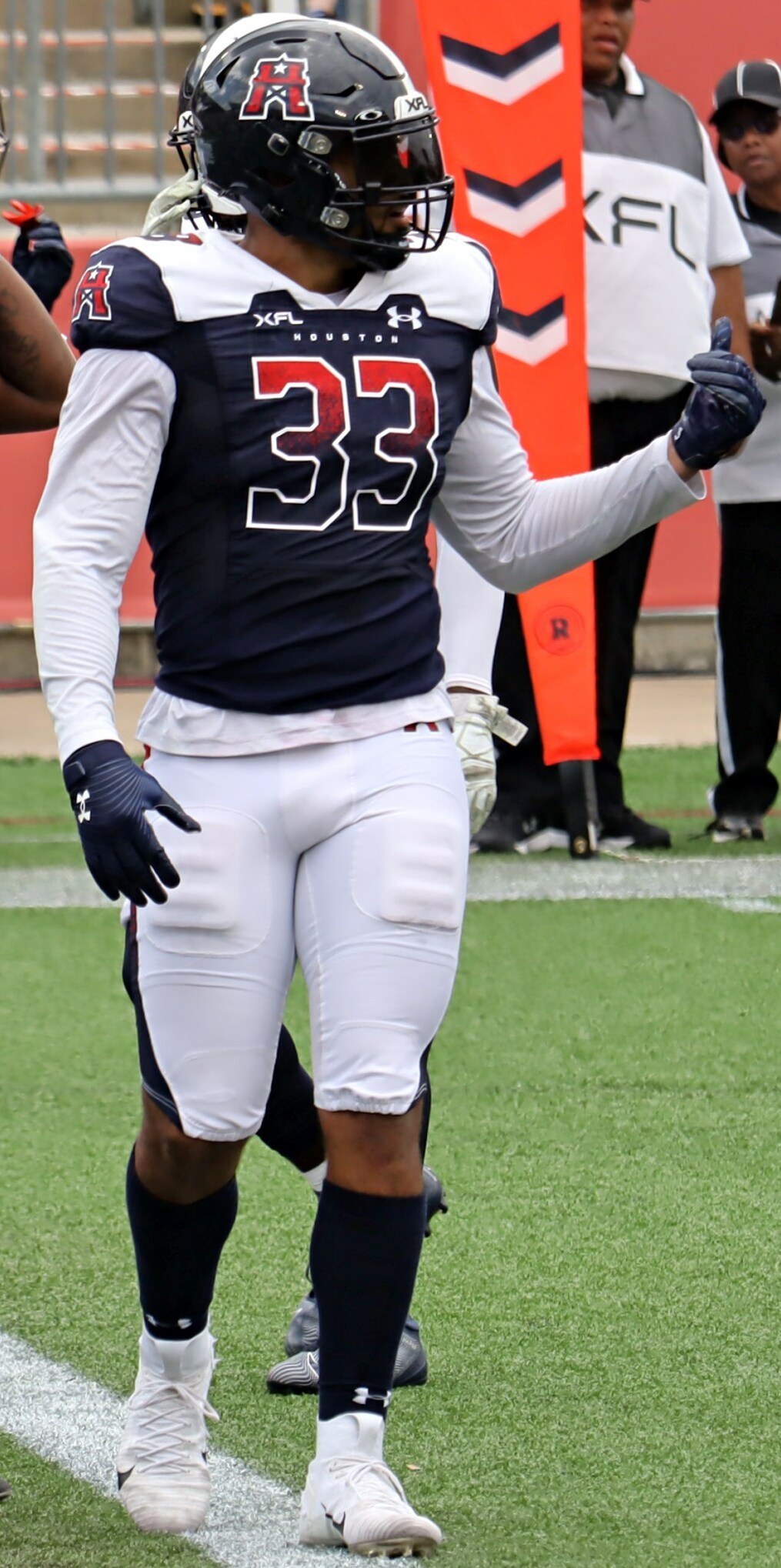
- Harris with the Houston Roughnecks in 2023

Duke Blue Devils
- Title: Defensive ends coach

Personal information
- Born: September 17, 1995 (age 31); Winter Park, Florida, U.S.
- Listed height: 6 ft 2 in (1.88 m)
- Listed weight: 248 lb (112 kg)

Career information
- High school: Winter Park
- College: Miami (FL) (2014–2017)
- NFL draft: 2018: undrafted

Career history

Playing
- New England Patriots (2018–2019)*; Miami Dolphins (2019); New York Giants (2020–2021); Baltimore Ravens (2022)*; Las Vegas Raiders (2022)*; Houston Roughnecks (2023); DC Defenders (2024)
- * Offseason or practice squad member only

Coaching
- Illinois (2024) Assistant outside linebackers coach; Illinois (2025) Outside linebackers coach; Duke (2026–present) Defensive ends coach

Awards and highlights
- Super Bowl champion (LIII); All-XFL Team (2023); XFL sacks leader (2023); Third-team All-ACC (2017)

Career NFL statistics
- Total tackles: 34
- Sacks: 2.0
- Forced fumbles: 1
- Stats at Pro Football Reference

Trent Harris (born September 17, 1995) is an American former professional football linebacker who is the defensive ends coach for the Duke Blue Devils. He played college football for Miami. He signed with the New England Patriots as an undrafted free agent in 2018.

== College career ==
Harris played four seasons for the Miami Hurricanes. He was named third team All-Atlantic Coast Conference as a senior after recording 37 tackles, 10.5 tackles for loss and had a team high 8.5 sacks. Harris finished his collegiate career with 126 tackles and 26 tackles for loss with 15 sacks, three passes defended, three fumble recoveries and one forced fumble.

== Professional career ==
Pre-draft measurables
Height	Weight	Arm length	Hand span	Wingspan	40-yard dash	10-yard split	20-yard split	20-yard shuttle	Three-cone drill	Vertical jump	Broad jump	Bench press
6 ft 1 3/4 in (1.87 m)	246 lb (112 kg)	32 1/2 in (0.83 m)	9 1/2 in (0.24 m)	6 ft 8 1/8 in (2.04 m)	5.02 s	1.72 s	2.83 s	4.45 s	7.18 s	32.0 in (0.81 m)	9 ft 9 in (2.97 m)	17 reps
All values from Pro Day

=== New England Patriots ===
Harris signed with the New England Patriots as an undrafted free agent on April 28, 2018. He was cut at the end of training camp but was re-signed to the Patriots practice squad on September 2, 2018. He spent the 2018 season on the Patriots practice squad and was cut the following season at the end of training camp. He earned a Super Bowl title when the Patriots won Super Bowl LIII.

=== Miami Dolphins ===
Harris was claimed off waivers by the Miami Dolphins on September 1, 2019. He made his NFL debut on September 22, 2019, against the Dallas Cowboys, making one tackle in a 31–6 loss. In week 16 against the Cincinnati Bengals, Harris recorded a strip sack on Andy Dalton which was recovered by teammate Andrew Van Ginkel during the 38–35 overtime win.

On March 12, 2020, Harris was assigned a one-year, $585,000 tender by the Dolphins. He signed the tender on April 22, 2020. The Dolphins waived him on July 26, 2020. He was re-signed on August 25, 2020. He was waived on September 5, 2020.

=== New York Giants ===
On October 14, 2020, Harris was signed to the New York Giants practice squad. He was elevated to the active roster on October 17 and 22 for the team's weeks 6 and 7 games against the Washington Football Team and Philadelphia Eagles, and reverted to the practice squad after each game. He was promoted to the active roster on October 27. Harris was waived on December 8, 2020, and re-signed to the practice squad two days later. He signed a reserve/future contract on January 4, 2021.

On September 1, 2021, Harris was waived by the Giants and re-signed to the practice squad. On November 1, 2021, Harris was elevated from the practice squad for the game against the Kansas City Chiefs and on November 6, 2021, Harris was elevated for the second time this season for the game against the Las Vegas Raiders. On November 22, 2021, Harris was signed to the active roster. On December 3, 2021, Harris was placed on injured reserve. On December 30, 2021, Harris was waived. On January 10, 2022, Harris was signed to a reserve/future contract.

On May 18, 2022, Harris was waived.

=== Baltimore Ravens ===
On August 13, 2022, Harris signed with the Baltimore Ravens, but was placed on injured reserve three days later. He was released on August 25.

=== Las Vegas Raiders ===
On December 28, 2022, Harris was signed to the Las Vegas Raiders practice squad.

=== Houston Roughnecks ===
Harris played for the Houston Roughnecks of the XFL in 2023. In the season, he led the XFL in sacks, with 9.5. His 12 tackles for loss were tied for the league-lead by the end of April and he compiled 30 total tackles (including 16 solo). Following the season, he was named to the 2023 All-XFL team.

On May 2, 2023, Harris was invited to the Denver Broncos' rookie minicamp. Following the minicamp, the Broncos signed Seattle Sea Dragons quarterback Ben DiNucci and elected not to sign Harris. The Roughnecks brand was transferred to the Houston Gamblers when the XFL and United States Football League (USFL) merged to create the United Football League (UFL).

=== DC Defenders ===
On January 5, 2024, Harris was drafted by the DC Defenders during the 2024 UFL dispersal draft. He announced his retirement on June 22, 2024.

== Coaching career ==
On July 27, 2024, Harris was added to the Illinois Fighting Illini staff.
