= Cody Latimer =

American football player and coach (born 1992)

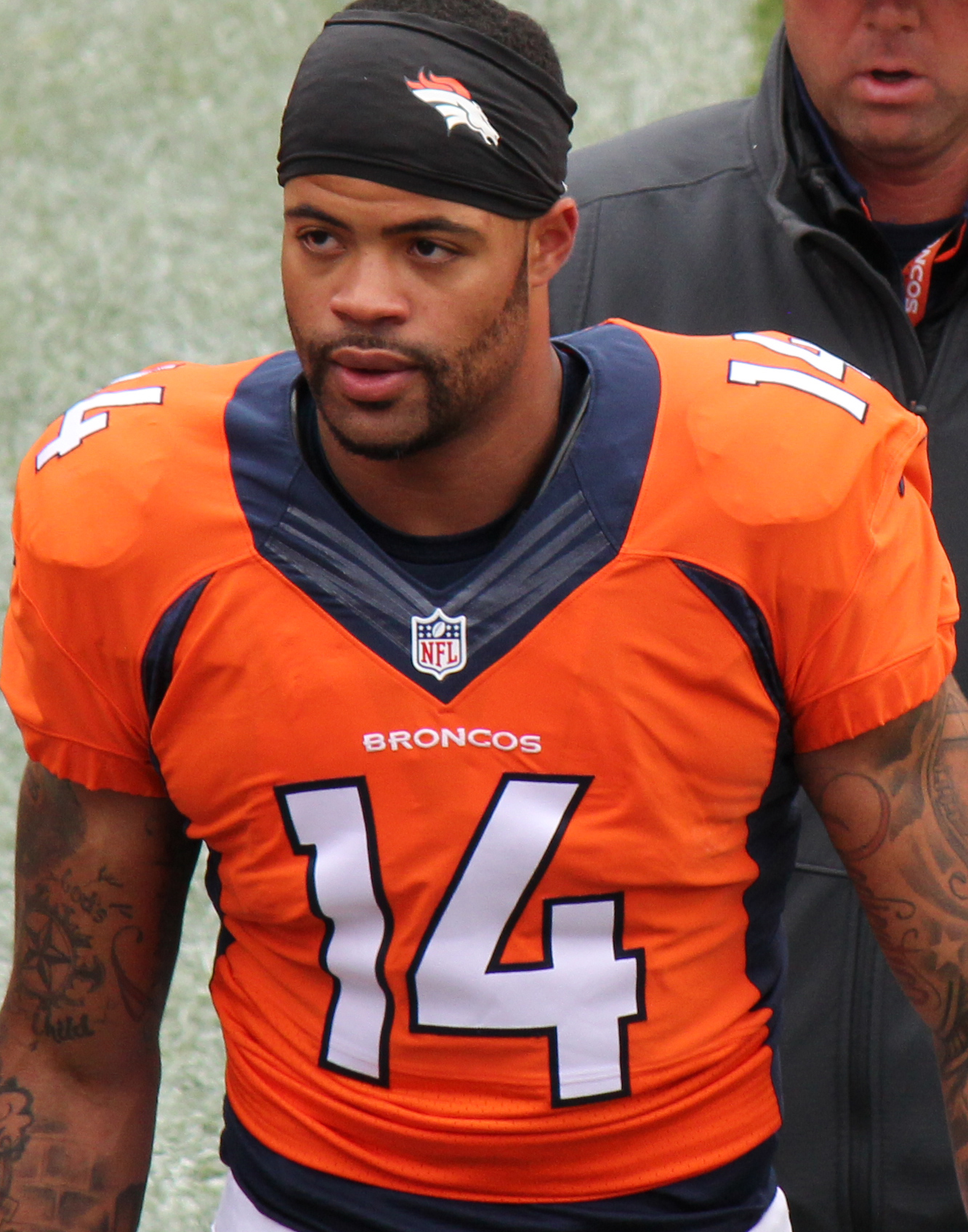
- Latimer with the Denver Broncos in 2014

Birmingham Stallions
- Title: Wide receivers coach

Personal information
- Born: October 10, 1992 (age 34); Dayton, Ohio, U.S.
- Listed height: 6 ft 3 in (1.91 m)
- Listed weight: 222 lb (101 kg)

Career information
- Position: Wide receiver (No. 14, 12)
- High school: Jefferson Township (Dayton)
- College: Indiana
- NFL draft: 2014: 2nd round, 56th overall pick

Career history

Playing
- Denver Broncos (2014–2017); New York Giants (2018–2019); Washington Redskins / Football Team (2020)*; Orlando Guardians (2023); San Antonio Brahmas (2024)
- * Offseason or practice squad member only

Coaching
- San Antonio Brahmas (2025) Wide receivers coach; Birmingham Stallions (2026–present) Wide receivers coach

Awards and highlights
- Super Bowl champion (50); All-XFL Team (2023); 2× Second-team All-Big Ten (2012, 2013)

Career NFL statistics
- Receptions: 70
- Receiving yards: 935
- Receiving touchdowns: 6
- Stats at Pro Football Reference

Cody Derek Latimer (born October 10, 1992) is an American professional football coach and former wide receiver and tight end. He was selected by the Denver Broncos as a wide receiver in the second round of the 2014 NFL draft. He played college football at Indiana. He was a member of the Broncos in their Super Bowl 50 win. He also played for the New York Giants of the National Football League (NFL), Orlando Guardians of the XFL, and San Antonio Brahmas of the United Football League (UFL). He currently serves as the wide receivers coach for the Birmingham Stallions.

== Early life ==
Latimer attended Jefferson Township High School in Dayton, Ohio. He was a first-team all-conference selection after hauling in 42 catches for 722 yards and six touchdowns in addition to 372 rushing yards, six touchdowns, and 27 carries in just eight games as a senior. On defense, he made 89 tackles, four interceptions (one score) and forced two fumbles. In addition to football, he played basketball, baseball, and ran track.

Considered a three-star recruit by Rivals.com, Latimer was rated as the 49th best wide receiver prospect of his class.

== College career ==
Latimer attended Indiana University from 2011 to 2013.

On September 15, 2012, Latimer had four receptions for 115 yards and two touchdowns against Ball State. On November 3, against Iowa, he had seven receptions for 113 yards and three touchdowns.

In the 2013 season, Latimer had five games going over the 100-yard mark: 137 against Bowling Green, 136 against Missouri, 140 against Penn State, 189 and three touchdowns against Illinois, and 110 against Purdue.

During his career, he started 24 of 32 games with 135 receptions for 2,042 yards and 17 touchdowns. He entered the 2014 NFL draft after his junior season.

== Professional career ==
Pre-draft measurables
| Height | Weight | Arm length | Hand span | 40-yard dash | 10-yard split | 20-yard split | Vertical jump | Bench press |
|---|---|---|---|---|---|---|---|---|
| 6 ft 2 1/2 in (1.89 m) | 215 lb (98 kg) | 32 5/8 in (0.83 m) | 9 5/8 in (0.24 m) | 4.44 s | 1.55 s | 2.59 s | 39 in (0.99 m) | 23 reps |
All values from NFL Combine

=== Denver Broncos ===
==== 2014 ====
The Denver Broncos selected Latimer in the second round (56th overall) of the 2014 NFL draft. He was the tenth wide receiver to be selected and was one of two Indiana Hoosiers in 2014. On June 2, 2014, the Broncos signed Latimer to a four-year, $3.70 million contract that includes $2.02 million guaranteed and a signing bonus of $1.01 million.

Throughout training camp, he competed for a job as the backup wide receiver against veterans Andre Caldwell and Jordan Norwood. Head coach John Fox named Latimer the fourth wide receiver on the depth chart to start the regular season after Wes Welker was suspended for the first four games after he failed a drug test for amphetamines and violated the NFL's performance enhancing substances policy and Norwood tore his ACL during training camp practice. He started the season behind Demaryius Thomas, Emmanuel Sanders, and Caldwell.

He made his professional regular season debut in the Broncos' season-opening 31–24 victory against the Indianapolis Colts. Fox elected to play Isaiah Burse for his added punt return capabilities and listed Latimer as a healthy scratch for five consecutive games (Weeks 2-7). In Week 10, Latimer caught his first career reception off of a nine-yard pass by quarterback Peyton Manning, as the Broncos routed the Oakland Raiders 41–17. He was listed as inactive the following week as the St. Louis Rams defeated the Broncos 22–17. On December 28, 2014, he caught a season-long 14-yard pass during a 47–14 win against the Raiders. He finished his rookie season with two receptions for 23 receiving yards and two kick returns for 22-yards in eight games and zero starts. Latimer stated he had issues digesting the playbook and took too long during his rookie season to adjust to the pro game.

==== 2015 ====
On January 12, 2015, the Broncos and Fox agreed to mutually part ways after their 24–13 loss to the Colts in the American Football Conference (AFC) Divisional round. On January 19, 2015, the Broncos appointed former Baltimore Ravens offensive coordinator Gary Kubiak as their new head coach. Latimer competed against Caldwell and Norwood for role as the Broncos' third wide receiver after the Broncos opted to not re-sign Wes Welker. Kubiak named Latimer the fifth wide receiver on the depth chart to start the regular season, behind Thomas, Sanders, Caldwell, and Norwood.

In Week 10, Latimer caught a season-high three passes for 30 yards during Denver's 29–13 loss to the Kansas City Chiefs. On November 22, 2015, he earned his first start and had two receptions for 22-yard and caught his first career touchdown on a ten-yard pass from Brock Osweiler as the Broncos defeated the Chicago Bears 17–15. He finished the 2015 season with six receptions for 59-yards and one touchdown in 14 games and one start.

The Broncos finished the season atop the AFC West with a 12-4 record and received a playoff berth. On January 17, 2016, Latimer appeared in his first career playoff game and caught two passes for 18-yards as the Broncos defeated the Pittsburgh Steelers 23–16 in the Divisional Round. After defeating the New England Patriots in the AFC Championship, the Broncos went on to face the Panthers in the Super Bowl. On February 7, 2016, Latimer appeared in Super Bowl 50 with the Broncos as they defeated the Carolina Panthers by a score of 24–10.

==== 2016 ====
He entered training camp in 2016 and competed for the job as the third wide receiver against Norwood and Bennie Fowler.

In the 2016 season, with new quarterbacks Trevor Siemian and Paxton Lynch, Latimer played in 12 games with one start recording eight receptions for 76 yards. Latimer also had a career-high seven solo tackles on special teams and returned eight kicks for 200-yards.

==== 2017 ====
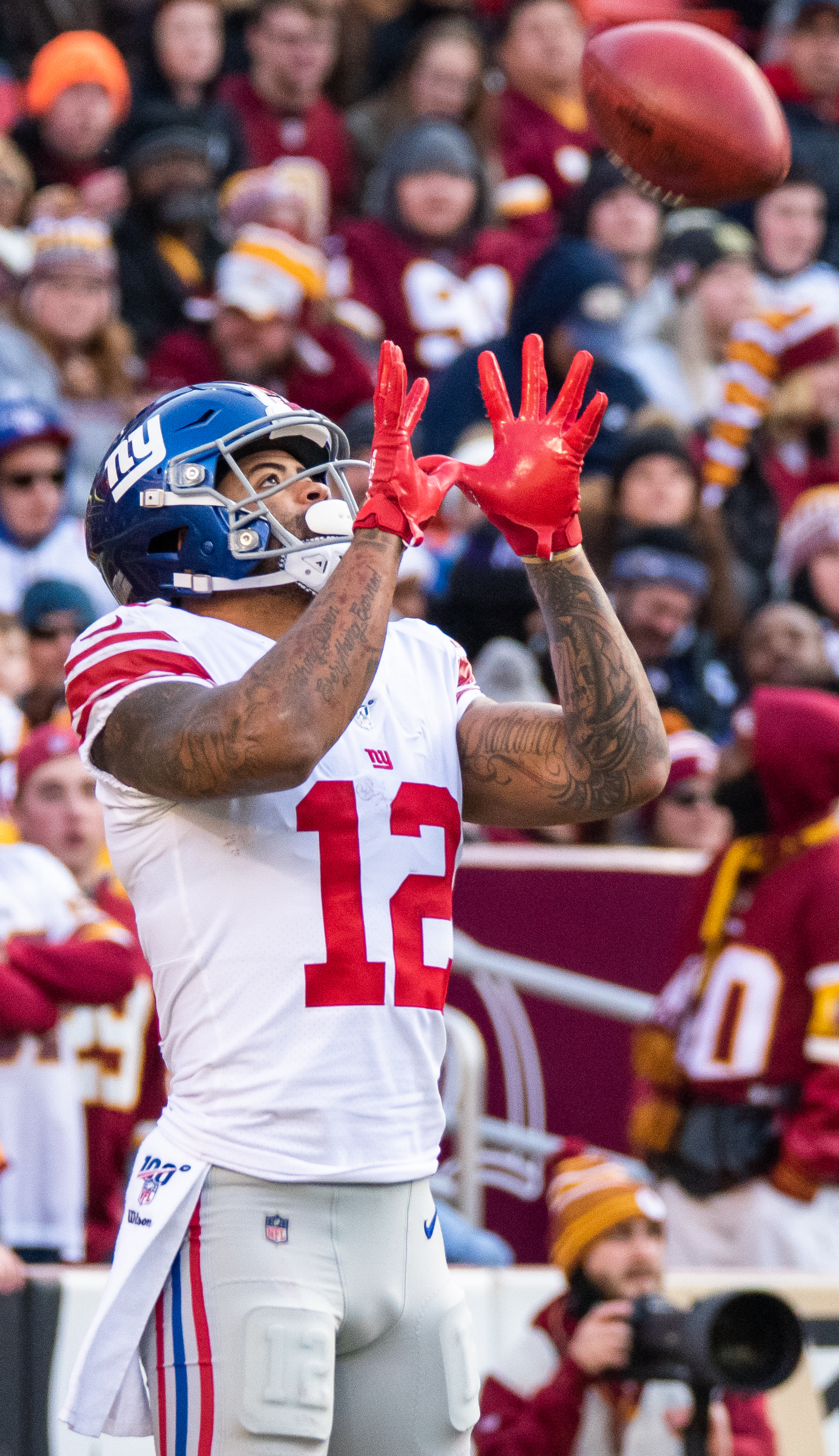
Latimer with the New York Giants in 2019

Latimer finished his fourth season in 2017 with a career-high 19 receptions for 287 receiving yards and two touchdowns in 11 games. He also had eight kick returns for 190-yards.

=== New York Giants ===
On March 19, 2018, Latimer signed with the New York Giants, reuniting with his former wide receivers coach, Tyke Tolbert. He was placed on injured reserve on October 16, 2018, after suffering a hamstring injury in Week 6. He was activated off injured reserve on December 19, 2018. In six games in the 2018 season, Latimer recorded 11 receptions for 190 receiving yards and one receiving touchdown.

Latimer re-signed with the team on March 22, 2019. In the 2019 season, Latimer appeared in 15 games and recorded 24 receptions for 300 receiving yards and two receiving touchdowns.

=== Washington Redskins / Football Team ===
Latimer signed with the Washington Redskins on April 7, 2020. He was placed on the commissioner's exempt list on July 27, 2020, following his May 2020 arrest. He was released on August 23 by the Washington Football Team.

=== Orlando Guardians ===
Latimer was selected by the Orlando Guardians of the XFL in the 11th round of the 2023 XFL Skill Players Draft. Latimer was listed as a tight end on the Guardians 51-man roster that was posted on the Guardians Instagram account. The Guardians folded when the XFL and United States Football League (USFL) merged to create the United Football League (UFL).

=== San Antonio Brahmas ===
On January 5, 2024, Latimer was selected by the San Antonio Brahmas of the UFL during the 2024 UFL dispersal draft. He signed with the team on January 22. He was placed on Injured reserve on May 28, 2024.

== Career statistics ==
=== NFL ===
| Season | | | | Receiving | | | | | | Returning | | | | | Fumbles | |
| Year | Team | GP | GS | Tgt | Rec | Yds | Avg | Lng | TD | KR | Yds | Avg | Lng | TD | Fum | Lost |
|---|---|---|---|---|---|---|---|---|---|---|---|---|---|---|---|---|
| 2014 | DEN | 8 | 0 | 4 | 2 | 23 | 11.5 | 14 | 0 | 2 | 22 | 11 | 14 | 0 | 0 | 0 |
| 2015 | DEN | 14 | 1 | 11 | 6 | 59 | 9.8 | 15 | 1 | 0 | 27 | 0 | 27 | 0 | 0 | 0 |
| 2016 | DEN | 12 | 1 | 15 | 8 | 76 | 9.5 | 16 | 0 | 8 | 200 | 25.0 | 46 | 0 | 0 | 0 |
| 2017 | DEN | 11 | 1 | 31 | 19 | 287 | 15.1 | 32 | 2 | 8 | 190 | 23.8 | 36 | 0 | 1 | 0 |
| 2018 | NYG | 6 | 2 | 16 | 11 | 190 | 17.3 | 39 | 1 | 5 | 123 | 24.6 | 34 | 0 | 0 | 0 |
| 2019 | NYG | 15 | 10 | 42 | 24 | 300 | 12.5 | 43 | 2 | 24 | 570 | 23.8 | 50 | 0 | 0 | 0 |
| NFL Career | | 66 | 15 | 119 | 70 | 935 | 12.6 | 159 | 6 | 47 | 1132 | 18.0 | 207 | 0 | 1 | 0 |

=== XFL ===
| Season | | | | Receiving | | | | | | Returning | | | | | Fumbles | |
| Year | Team | GP | GS | Tgt | Rec | Yds | Avg | Lng | TD | KR | Yds | Avg | Lng | TD | Fum | Lost |
|---|---|---|---|---|---|---|---|---|---|---|---|---|---|---|---|---|
| 2023 | ORL | 9 | 9 | 66 | 50 | 593 | 11.9 | 45 | 4 | 0 | 0 | 0 | 0 | 0 | 0 | 0 |
| 2024 | SA | 9 | 9 | 41 | 25 | 391 | 10.9 | 40 | 1 | 0 | 0 | 0 | 0 | 0 | 0 | 0 |
| XFL Career | | 9 | 9 | 66 | 50 | 593 | 11.9 | 45 | 4 | 0 | 0 | 0 | 0 | 0 | 0 | 0 |

=== College ===
| Year | School | G | Receiving | | | |
| Year | School | G | Rec | Yds | Avg | TD |
|---|---|---|---|---|---|---|
| 2011 | Indiana | 8 | 12 | 141 | 11.8 | 2 |
| 2012 | Indiana | 12 | 51 | 805 | 15.8 | 6 |
| 2013 | Indiana | 12 | 72 | 1,096 | 15.2 | 9 |
| Career | | 32 | 135 | 2,042 | 15.1 | 17 |

== Personal life ==
His father, Colby, played college football at Bowling Green State University in the 1980s, and died from cancer in 2005. Latimer also lost his grandmother from cancer and raises donations for the American Cancer Society. On May 31, 2016, Latimer was arrested for an outstanding traffic ticket while police were investigating his complaint that he was a victim of domestic violence at the hands of his girlfriend. On May 16, 2020, Latimer was arrested in Colorado for assault in the second degree, illegal discharge of a firearm and reckless endangerment.
