= 2023 San Antonio Brahmas season =

American professional football season

- Owner: Alpha Acquico, LLC
- General manager: Will Lewis (Director Player Personnel)
- Head coach: Hines Ward
- Home stadium: Alamodome

Results
- Record: 3–7
- Division place: 3rd XFL South
- Playoffs: Did not qualify

The 2023 San Antonio Brahmas season was the first season for the San Antonio Brahmas as a professional American football franchise. They are members of the XFL, one of eight teams to compete in the league for the 2023 season. The Brahmas played their home games at the Alamodome and were led by head coach Hines Ward.

== Roster ==
2023 San Antonio Brahmas final roster
Quarterbacks: 16 Jack Coan; 12 Paxton Lynch; 4 Jawon Pass; Running backs: 31 Jon Hilliman; 25 Kevin Marks Jr.; 9 Jacques Patrick; Wide receivers: 82 Landen Akers; 6 Fred Brown; 13 Nick Holley; 10 Travis Jonsen; 81 Travis Toivonen; 18 T. J. Vasher	Offensive linemen: 57 Mike Brown G; 78 Malcolm Bunche G; 71 Roubbens Joseph T; 59 Luke Juriga C; 74 Derrick Kelly T; 66 Kohl Levao G; 77 Chidi Okeke T; 75 Maea Teuhema G; 62 Dwayne Wallace T; Defensive linemen: 33 Drew Beesley DE; 90 Matthew Gotel DT; 99 P. J. Hall DT; 98 Jamahl Johnson DT; 45 Delontae Scott DE; 44 Mike Scott DE; 92 Shakir Soto DT; 95 Kamilo Tongamoa DT; 42 Mike Tverdov DE	Linebackers: 3 Ben Davis OLB; 55 Da'Sean Downey OLB; 27 Terrill Hanks OLB; 40 Riko Jeffers MLB; 15 Jordan Williams OLB/MLB; 21 Sean Williams Jr. MLB; Defensive backs: 5 Tenny Adewusi FS; 1 Luq Barcoo CB; 2 Terrell Bonds CB; 14 Divine Buckrham FS; 29 Marco Domio CB; 26 Jameson Houston CB; 8 Kameron Kelly SS/CB; 20 Kemah Siverand CB; 22 Ranthony Texada CB; Special teams: 23 John Parker Romo K; 47 Rex Sunahara LS; 0 Brad Wing P	Reserve lists: -- Justin Alexandre DE (NF-Inj.); 11 Kalen Ballage RB (IR); 13 Kurt Benkert QB (IR); 91 Javier Edwards DT (IR); 28 Jack Koerner SS (IR); 24 Ryan Lewis CB (IR); 72 Norman Price G/T (IR); -- Gavin Robertson CB (IR); 17 Reid Sinnett QB (IR); 50 Kobe Smith DT (IR); 80 Jalen Tolliver WR (IR); -- Calvin Turner WR (IR); 58 Willie Wright G (IR); 50 active, 13 inactive

}

== Schedule ==
All times Central

Week	Day	Date	Kickoff	TV	Opponent	Results		Location	Attendance
Week	Day	Date	Kickoff	TV	Opponent	Score	Record	Location	Attendance
1	Sunday	February 19	2:00 p.m.	ABC	St. Louis BattleHawks	15–18	0–1	Alamodome	24,245
2	Sunday	February 26	3:00 p.m.	ESPN	at Orlando Guardians	30–12	1–1	Camping World Stadium	12,011
3	Sunday	March 5	7:00 p.m.	ESPN2	at Houston Roughnecks	13–22	1–2	TDECU Stadium	11,309
4	Saturday	March 11	9:00 p.m.	FX	at Seattle Sea Dragons	6–15	1–3	Lumen Field	15,103
5	Sunday	March 19	8:00 p.m.	ESPN2	Arlington Renegades	10–12	1–4	Alamodome	13,274
6	Sunday	March 26	2:00 p.m.	ABC	at Arlington Renegades	15–9	2–4	Choctaw Stadium	12,368
7	Saturday	April 1	2:00 p.m.	ESPN2	at Vegas Vipers	12–26	2–5	Cashman Field	6,041
8	Sunday	April 9	2:00 p.m.	ABC	Houston Roughnecks	15–17 (OT)	2–6	Alamodome	12,243
9	Saturday	April 15	6:00 p.m.	ESPN2	Orlando Guardians	25–23	3–6	Alamodome	13,023
10	Saturday	April 22	2:00 p.m.	ABC	DC Defenders	28–29	3–7	Alamodome	12,129

=== Game summaries ===
==== Week 1: vs. St. Louis Battlehawks ====
Week 1: St. Louis Battlehawks at San Antonio Brahmas – Game summary

Quarter	1	2	3	4	Total
Battlehawks	0	3	0	15	18
Brahmas	3	0	3	9	15

at Alamodome, San Antonio, Texas

- Date: February 19
- Game time: 2:00 p.m. CDT
- Game weather: 72 °F (22 °C)
- Game attendance: 24,245
- Referee: Reggie Smith
- TV announcers (ABC): Matt Barrie, Joey Galloway, Eric Mac Lain and Tiffany Blackmon

Game information

First quarter

- SA – Parker Romo 43-yard field goal, 2:54. Brahmas 3-0. Drive: 8 plays, 32 yards, 3:26.

Second quarter

- STL – Donny Hageman 32-yard field goal, 8:03. Tied 3-3. Drive: 5 plays, 15 yards, 3:07.

Third quarter

- SA – Parker Romo 29-yard field goal, 9:16. Brahmas 6-3. Drive: 11 plays, 56 yards, 5:44.

Fourth quarter

- SA – Fred Brown 4-yard pass from Jack Coan (1-pt Conversion No Good), 10:42. Brahmas 12-3. Drive: 10 plays, 63 yards, 4:32.
- SA – Parker Romo 48-yard field goal, 3:02. Brahmas 15-3. Drive: 9 plays, 37 yards, 5:08.
- STL – Hakeem Butler 18-yard pass from A. J. McCarron (3-pt Conversion Good by Austin Proehl), 1:25. Brahmas 15-12. Drive: 8 plays, 71 yards, 1:37.
- STL – Austin Proehl 14-yard pass from A. J. McCarron (1-pt Conversion No Good), 0:16. Battlehawks 18-15. Drive: 6 plays, 75 yards, 2:46.

Top passers

- STL – A. J. McCarron – 18/27, 190 yards, 2 TD
- SA – Jack Coan – 25/36, 207 yards, 1 TD, 1 INT

Top rushers

- STL – Brian Hill – 6 rushes, 55 yards
- SA – Kalen Ballage – 24 rushes, 84 yards

Top receivers

- STL – Austin Proehl – 4 receptions, 49 yards, 1 TD
- SA – Jalen Tolliver – 3 receptions, 49 yards

==== Week 2: at Orlando Guardians ====
Week 2: San Antonio Brahmas at Orlando Guardians – Game summary

Quarter	1	2	3	4	Total
Brahmas	6	7	14	3	30
Guardians	6	0	0	6	12

at Camping World Stadium, Orlando, Florida

- Date: February 26
- Game time: 3:00 p.m. CDT
- Game weather: 86 °F (30 °C)
- Game attendance: 12,011
- Referee: Mike Vandervelde
- TV announcers (ESPN): Tom Hart, Greg McElroy, and Cole Cubelic

Game information

First quarter

- SA – Deon Yelder 3-yard pass from Jack Coan (2-pt Conversion No Good), 9:31. Brahmas 6–0. Drive: 9 plays, 45 yards, 5:29.
- ORL – Eli Rogers 8-yard pass from Paxton Lynch (1-pt Conversion No Good), 5:19. Tied 6–6. Drive: 7 plays, 67 yards, 4:12.

Second quarter

- SA – Alize Mack 19-yard pass from Jack Coan (1-pt Conversion Good by T. J. Vasher), 1:01. Brahmas 13–6. Drive: 9 plays, 77 yards, 2:24.

Third quarter

- SA – Jalen Tolliver 24-yard pass from Jack Coan (1-pt Conversion Good by Deon Yelder), 8:50. Brahmas 20–6. Drive: 8 Plays, 75 Yards, 4:25.
- SA – Alize Mack 7-yard pass from Jack Coan (1-pt Conversion Good by Jon Hilliman), 6:42. Brahmas 27–6. Drive: 2 Plays, 8 Yards, 0:19.

Fourth quarter

- ORL – Cody Latimer 4-yard pass from Deondre Francois (2-pt Conversion No Good), 12:45. Brahmas 27–12. Drive: 13 Plays, 90 Yards, 8:57.
- SA – John Parker Romo 40-yard field goal, 4:40. Brahmas 30–12. Drive: 7 Plays, -1 Yards, 4:07.

Top passers

- SA – Jack Coan – 16/24, 165 yards, 3 TD
- ORL – Paxton Lynch – 9/19, 79 yards, 1 TD

Top rushers

- SA – Kalen Ballage – 12 rushes, 23 yards
- ORL – Jah-Maine Martin – 9 rushes, 46 yards

Top receivers

- SA – Alize Mack – 4 receptions, 48 yards, 1 TD
- ORL – JaVonta Payton – 3 receptions, 47 yards

==== Week 3: at Houston Roughnecks ====
Week 3: San Antonio Brahmas at Houston Roughnecks – Game summary

Quarter	1	2	3	4	Total
Brahmas	7	0	6	0	13
Roughnecks	8	14	0	0	22

at TDECU Stadium, Houston, Texas

- Date: March 5
- Game time: 7:00 p.m. CDT
- Game weather: 69 °F (21 °C)
- Game attendance: 11,309
- Referee: Jason Autrey
- TV announcers (ESPN2): Tom Hart, Greg McElroy, and Cole Cubelic

Game information

First quarter

- SA – T. J. Vasher 9-yard pass from Jack Coan (1-pt Conversion Good by T. J. Vasher), 12:29. Brahmas 7–0. Drive: 5 Plays, 36 Yards, 2:31.
- HOU – Jontre Kirkland 7-yard pass from Brandon Silvers (2-pt Conversion Good by Jontre Kirkland), 8:30. Roughnecks 8–7. Drive: 8 Plays, 45 Yards, 3:59.

Second quarter

- HOU – Jontre Kirkland 3-yard pass from Brandon Silvers (2-pt Conversion No Good), 11:16. Roughnecks 14–7. Drive: 8 Plays, 84 Yards, 3:51.
- HOU – Deontay Burnett 18-yard pass from Brandon Silvers (2-pt Conversion Good by Cole McDonald), 4:54. Roughnecks 22–7. Drive: 7 Plays, 72 Yards, 3:39.

Third quarter

- SA – Jacques Patrick 2-yard rush (2-pt Conversion No Good), 2:53. Roughnecks 22–13. Drive: 8 Plays, 45 Yards, 5:16.

Fourth quarter

Top passers

- SA – Jack Coan – 8/20, 64 yards, 1 TD
- HOU – Brandon Silvers – 24/35, 278 yards, 3 TD

Top rushers

- SA – Kalen Ballage – 10 rushes, 35 yards
- HOU – Max Borghi – 15 rushes, 74 yards

Top receivers

- SA – Alize Mack – 3 receptions, 27 yards
- HOU – Jontre Kirkland – 6 receptions, 77 yards

==== Week 4: at Seattle Sea Dragons ====
Week 4: San Antonio Brahmas at Seattle Sea Dragons – Game summary

Quarter	1	2	3	4	Total
Brahmas	3	3	0	0	6
Sea Dragons	0	6	3	6	15

at Lumen Field, Seattle, Washington

- Date: March 11
- Game time: 9:00 p.m. CDT
- Game weather: 45 °F (7 °C)
- Game attendance: 15,103
- Referee: Chris Coyte
- TV announcers (FX): Lowell Galindo, Sam Acho, and Taylor McGregor

Game information

First quarter

- SA – Parker Romo 38-yard field goal, 0:38. Brahmas 3–0. Drive: 11 Plays, 60 Yards, 6:02.

Second quarter

- SEA – Juwan Green 4-yard pass from Ben DiNucci (3-pt Conversion No Good), 0:39. Sea Dragons 6–3. Drive: 7 Plays, 85 Yards, 1:14.
- SA – Parker Romo 57-yard field goal, 0:04. Tied 6–6. Drive: 4 Plays, 41 Yards, 0:33.

Third quarter

- SEA – Dominik Eberle 35-yard field goal, 2:02. Sea Dragons 9–6. Drive: 13 Plays, 60 Yards, 7:09.

Fourth quarter

- SEA – Morgan Ellison 1-yard rush (1-pt Conversion No Good), 3:10. Sea Dragons 15–6. Drive: 10 Plays, 59 Yards, 5:42.

Top passers

- SA – Jack Coan – 20/39, 189 yards, 0 TD
- SEA – Ben DiNucci – 28/41, 264 yards, 1 TD

Top rushers

- SA – Kalen Ballage – 5 rushes, 5 yards
- SEA – Morgan Ellison – 16 rushes, 69 yards

Top receivers

- SA – Jalen Tolliver – 6 receptions, 34 yards
- SEA – Jahcour Pearson – 8 receptions, 76 yards

==== Week 5: vs. Arlington Renegades ====
Week 5: Arlington Renegades at San Antonio Brahmas – Game summary

Quarter	1	2	3	4	Total
Renegades	3	3	6	0	12
Brahmas	7	3	0	0	10

at Alamodome, San Antonio, Texas

- Date: March 19
- Game time: 8:00 p.m. CDT
- Game weather: 55 °F (13 °C)
- Game attendance: 13,274
- Referee: Jeff Heaser
- TV announcers (ESPN2): Tom Hart, Cole Cubelic, and Katie George

Game information

First quarter

- ARL – Taylor Russolino 43-yard field goal, 9:48. Renegades 3–0 Drive: 9 Plays, 45 Yards, 5:12.
- SA – T. J. Vasher 6-yard pass from Reid Sinnett (1-pt Conversion Good by T. J. Vasher), 2:55. Brahmas 7–3. Drive: 7 Plays, 33 Yards, 3:37.

Second quarter

- ARL – Taylor Russolino 25-yard field goal, 10:40. Brahmas 7–6. Drive: 15 Plays, 78 Yards, 7:15.
- SA – Parker Romo 45-yard field goal, 0:04. Brahmas 10–6. Drive: 5 Plays, 34 Yards, 1:00.

Third quarter

- ARL – De'Veon Smith 1-yard rush (2-pt Conversion No Good), 1:12. Renegades 12–10. Drive: 14 Plays, 98 Yards, 8:35.

Fourth quarter

Top passers

- ARL – Kyle Sloter – 14/26, 148 yards, 0 TD
- SA – Reid Sinnett – 13/19, 97 yards, 1 TD

Top rushers

- ARL – De'Veon Smith – 19 rushes, 44 yards
- SA – Jacques Patrick – 6 rushes, 26 yards

Top receivers

- ARL – Sal Cannella – 4 receptions, 32 yards
- SA – Kalen Ballage – 5 receptions, 42 yards

==== Week 6: at Arlington Renegades ====
Week 6: San Antonio Brahmas at Arlington Renegades – Game summary

Quarter	1	2	3	4	Total
Brahmas	3	6	0	6	15
Renegades	0	0	9	0	9

at Choctaw Stadium, Arlington, Texas

- Date: March 26
- Game time: 2:00 p.m. CDT
- Game weather: 73 °F (23 °C)
- Game attendance: 12,368
- Referee: Chris Coyte
- TV announcers (ABC): Tom Hart, Greg McElroy, Cole Cubelic and Katie George

Game information

First quarter

- SA – Parker Romo 28-yard field goal, 1:48. Brahmas 3–0. Drive: 11 Plays, 59 Yards, 7:33.

Second quarter

- SA – Fumble recovery returned for touchdown by Jordan Williams (2-pt Conversion No Good), 6:34. Brahmas 9–0. Drive: 1 Play, 0 Yards, 0:28.

Third quarter

- ARL – Taylor Russolino 53-yard field goal, 12:00. Brahmas 9–3. Drive: 6 Plays, 38 Yards, 3:00.
- ARL – LuJuan Willingham 16-yard pass from Drew Plitt (1-pt Conversion No Good), 8:38. Tied 9–9. Drive: 4 Plays, 33 Yards, 2:04.

Fourth quarter

- SA – Parker Romo 45-yard field goal, 9:02. Brahmas 12–9. Drive: 4 Plays, 48 Yards, 2:02.
- SA – Parker Romo 56–yard field goal, 1:46. Brahmas 15–9. Drive: 7 Plays, 46 Yards, 2:19.

Top passers

- SA – Juwan Pass – 8/14, 57 yards, 0 TD
- ARL – Drew Plitt – 10/16, 163 yards, 1 TD

Top rushers

- SA – Jacques Patrick – 15 rushes, 82 yards
- ARL – Leddie Brown – 11 rushes, 38 yards

Top receivers

- SA – Jacques Patrick – 3 receptions, 18 yards
- ARL – De'Veon Smith – 4 receptions, 49 yards

==== Week 7: at Vegas Vipers ====
Week 7: San Antonio Brahmas at Vegas Vipers – Game summary

Quarter	1	2	3	4	Total
Brahmas	6	6	0	0	12
Vipers	8	11	7	0	26

at Cashman Field, Las Vegas, Nevada

- Date: April 1
- Game time: 2:00 p.m. CDT
- Game weather: 68 °F (20 °C)
- Game attendance: 6,041
- Referee: Reggie Smith
- TV announcers (ESPN2): Lowell Galindo, Sam Acho and Stormy Buonantony

Game information

First quarter

- SA – Fred Brown 1-yard pass from Kurt Benkert (2-pt Conversion No Good), 11:29. Brahmas 6–0. Drive: 6 Plays, 73 Yards, 3:33.
- VGS – Sean Price 33-yard pass from Jalan McClendon (2-pt Conversion Good by Cam Sutton), 6:40. Vipers 8–6. Drive: 9 Plays, 74 Yards, 4:47.

Second quarter

- VGS – Bailey Giffen 39-yard field goal, 11:11. Vipers 11–6. Drive: 12 Plays, 42 Yards, 7:31.
- SA – Kick returned 96 yards by Fred Brown for touchdown (2-pt Conversion No Good), 11:11. Brahmas 12–11. Drive: 1 play, 96 yards, 0:00.
- VGS – Rod Smith 17-yard pass from Jalan McClendon (2-pt Conversion Good by Sean Price), 7:09. Vipers 19–12. Drive: 7 Plays, 68 Yards, 3:52.

Third quarter

- VGS – John Lovett 1-yard rush (1-pt Conversion Good by Mathew Sexton), 10:54. Vipers 26–12. Drive: 10 Plays, 77 Yards, 4:06.

Fourth quarter

Top passers

- SA – Kurt Benkert – 22/31, 179 yards, 1 TD
- VGS – Jalan McClendon – 21/31, 264 yards, 2 TD

Top rushers

- SA – Jacques Patrick – 12 rushes, 20 yards
- VGS – Jalan McClendon – 8 rushes, 25 yards

Top receivers

- SA – Landen Akers – 6 receptions, 75 yards
- VGS – Mathew Sexton – 4 receptions, 72 yards

==== Week 8: vs. Houston Roughnecks ====
Week 8: Houston Roughnecks at San Antonio Brahmas – Game summary

Quarter	1	2	3	4	OT	Total
Roughnecks	6	3	6	0	2	17
Brahmas	3	3	0	9	0	15

at Alamodome, San Antonio, Texas

- Date: April 9
- Game time: 2:00 p.m. CDT
- Game weather: 70 °F (21 °C)
- Game attendance: 12,243
- Referee: Francisco Villar
- TV announcers (ABC): Tom Hart, Greg McElroy, Cole Cubelic and Kris Budden

Game information

First quarter

- HOU – Deontay Burnett 3-yard pass from Brandon Silvers (1-pt Conversion No Good), 8:52. Roughnecks 6–0. Drive: 12 Plays, 70 Yards, 6:08.
- SA – Parker Romo 26-yard field goal, 2:00. Roughnecks 6–3. Drive: 13 Plays, 63 Yards, 6:52.

Second quarter

- SA – Parker Romo 42-yard field goal, 6:29. Tied 6–6. Drive: 13 Plays, 66 Yards, 7:23.
- HOU – Austin Jones 41-yard field goal, 1:01. Roughnecks 9–6. Drive: 11 Plays, 52 Yards, 5:28

Third quarter

- HOU – Garrett Owens 5-yard pass from Brandon Silvers (1-pt Conversion No Good), 13:02. Roughnecks 15–6. Drive: 2 Plays, 0 Yards, 0:42.

Fourth quarter

- SA – Jacques Patrick 2-yard rush (3-pt Conversion No Good), 1:07. Roughnecks 15–12. Drive: 5 Plays, 36 Yards, 1:54.
- SA – Parker Romo 49-yard field goal, 0:07. Tied 15–15. Drive: 9 Plays, 44 Yards, 1:00.

Overtime

- HOU – Deontay Burnett pass from Cole McDonald for 2 points

Top passers

- HOU – Brandon Silvers – 17/36, 146 yards, 2 TD
- SA – Jack Coan – 23/41, 190 yards, 0 TD

Top rushers

- HOU – Max Borghi – 7 rushes, 10 yards
- SA – Jacques Patrick – 16 rushes, 96 yards

Top receivers

- HOU – Michael Bandy – 4 receptions, 29 yards
- SA – Landen Akers – 5 receptions, 62 yards

==== Week 9: vs. Orlando Guardians ====
Week 9: Orlando Guardians at San Antonio Brahmas – Game summary

Quarter	1	2	3	4	Total
Guardians	8	6	0	9	23
Brahmas	0	10	9	6	25

at Alamodome, San Antonio, Texas

- Date: April 15
- Game time: 6:00 p.m. CDT
- Game weather: 95 °F (35 °C)
- Game attendance: 13,023
- Referee: Jason Autrey
- TV announcers (ESPN2): Lowell Galindo, Sam Acho, and Ian Fitzsimmons

Game information

First quarter

- ORL – Jordan Thomas 4-yard pass from Quinten Dormady (2-pt Conversion Good by Jordan Thomas), 11:34. Guardians 8–0. Drive: 6 Plays, 73 Yards, 3:26.

Second quarter

- SA – Parker Romo 38-yard field goal, 14:21. Guardians 8–3. Drive: 12 Plays, 45 Yards, 6:18.
- ORL – Devin Darrington 1-yard rush (1-pt Conversion No Good), 10:36. Guardians 14–3. Drive: 7 Plays, 78 Yards, 3:41.
- SA – Jacques Patrick 6-yard rush (1-pt Conversion Good by Jacques Patrick), 0:27. Guardians 14–10. Drive: 6 Plays, 78 Yards, 1:12.

Third quarter

- SA – Parker Romo 29-yard field goal, 8:19. Guardians 14–13. Drive: 12 Plays, 75 Yards, 6:41.
- SA – Travis Toivonen 28-yard pass from Jack Coan (2-pt Conversion No Good), 2:08. Brahmas 19–14. Drive: 6 Plays, 72 Yards, 3:29.

Fourth quarter

- ORL – José Borregales 52-yard field goal, 10:46. Brahmas 19–17. Drive: 7 Plays, 28 Yards, 3:24.
- SA – Pass intercepted by Drew Beesley returned for touchdown, 7:07. Brahmas 25–17. Drive: 2 Plays, 20 Yards, 1:42.
- ORL – Deondre Francois 3-yard pass to Andrew Jamiel (2-pt Conversion No Good), 3:55. Brahmas 25–23. Drive: 6 Plays, 72 Yards, 3:12.

Top passers

- ORL – Quinten Dormady – 9/17, 47 yards, 1 TD
- SA – Jack Coan – 25/31, 302 yards, 1 TD

Top rushers

- ORL – Devin Darrington – 16 rushes, 133 yards
- SA – Jacques Patrick – 20 rushes, 80 yards

Top receivers

- ORL – Ryan Becker – 2 receptions, 17 yards
- SA – Jon Hilliman – 6 receptions, 47 yards

==== Week 10: vs. DC Defenders ====
Week 10: DC Defenders at San Antonio Brahmas – Game summary

Quarter	1	2	3	4	Total
Defenders	11	8	3	7	29
Brahmas	3	8	9	8	28

at Alamodome, San Antonio, Texas

- Date: April 22
- Game time: 2:00 p.m. CDT
- Game weather: 78 °F (26 °C)
- Game attendance: 12,129
- Referee: Reggie Smith
- TV announcers (ABC): Tom Hart, Greg McElroy, Cole Cubelic and Katie George

Game information

First quarter

- DC – Alex Ellis 5-yard pass from Jordan Ta'amu (2-pt Conversion Good by Josh Hammond), 12:41. Defenders 8–0. Drive: 5 Plays, 68 Yards, 2:19.
- SA – Parker Romo 26-yard field goal, 4:06. Defenders 8–3. Drive: 16 Plays, 64 Yards, 8:35.
- DC – Matt McCrane 21-yard field goal, 2:31. Defenders 11–3. Drive: 4 Plays, 5 Yards, 1:35.

Second quarter

- DC – Alex Ellis 1-yard pass from Jordan Ta'amu (2-pt Conversion Good by Brandon Smith), 11:44. Defenders 19–3. Drive: 5 Plays, 86 Yards, 2:03.
- SA – Jacques Patrick 1-yard rush (2-pt Conversion Good by T. J. Vasher), 0:03. Defenders 19–11. Drive: 6 Plays, 44 Yards, 0:30.

Third quarter

- SA – Parker Romo 28-yard field goal, 8:14. Defenders 19–14. Drive: 11 Plays, 60 Yards, 6:46.
- DC – Matt McCrane 49-yard field goal, 4:43. Defenders 22–14. Drive: 7 Plays, 45 Yards, 3:31.
- SA – Jon Hilliman 1-yard rush (2-pt Conversion No Good), 0:06. Defenders 22–20. Drive: 9 Plays, 75 Yards, 4:37.

Fourth quarter

- SA – Jacques Patrick 2-yard rush (2-pt Conversion Good by Jon Hilliman), 5:16. Brahmas 28–22. Drive: 10 Plays, 63 Yards, 6:27.
- DC – Jordan Ta'amu 4-yard rush (1-pt Conversion Good by Jordan Ta'amu), 2:32. Defenders 29–28. Drive: 5 Plays, 69 Yards, 2:43.

Top passers

- DC – Jordan Ta'amu – 15/22, 271 yards, 2 TD
- SA – Jack Coan – 34/48, 312 yards, 0 TD

Top rushers

- DC – Abram Smith – 10 rushes, 44 yards
- SA – Jacques Patrick – 16 rushes, 41 yards

Top receivers

- DC – Josh Hammond – 4 receptions, 59 yards
- SA – Landen Akers – 8 receptions, 90 yards

== Standings ==
2023 XFL standings
North Division
Team	W	L	PCT	GB	TD+/-	TD+	TD-	DIV	PF	PA	DIFF	STK
(y) DC Defenders	9	1	.900	–	-2	33	35	6–0	298	240	58	W3
(x) Seattle Sea Dragons	7	3	.700	2	+10	30	20	3–3	243	177	66	W2
(e) St. Louis Battlehawks	7	3	.700	2	+9	32	23	3–3	249	202	47	W1
(e) Vegas Vipers	2	8	.200	7	0	28	28	0–6	184	252	-68	L3
South Division
Team	W	L	PCT	GB	TD+/-	TD+	TD-	DIV	PF	PA	DIFF	STK
(y) Houston Roughnecks	7	3	.700	–	+4	30	26	6–0	247	182	65	W3
(x) Arlington Renegades	4	6	.400	3	-8	15	23	3–3	146	194	-48	L2
(e) San Antonio Brahmas	3	7	.300	4	-8	16	24	3–3	169	183	-14	L1
(e) Orlando Guardians	1	9	.100	6	-5	32	37	0–6	204	310	-106	L3
(x)–clinched playoff berth; (y)–clinched division; (e)–eliminated from playoff contention

== Staff ==
San Antonio Brahmas Staff
Front office: Director of team operations – Jose Jefferson; Director of player personnel – Will Lewis; Head coach: General manager/Head coach – Hines Ward; Offensive coaches: Offensive Coordinator/Running backs – Jimmie Johnson; Quarterbacks – Josh Neiswander; Wide Receivers – Jaime Elizondo; Offensive Line / Special Teams – Pete Mangurian; Tight Ends/Special Teams – Scott Boone	Defensive coaches: Defensive Coordinator – Jim Herrmann; Defensive Line – Paul Spicer; Linebackers – Joey Porter; Defensive Backs – Corey Chamblin; Asst. Defensive Backs – Derrius Bell; Team operations: Equipment Manager – Cortez Robinson; Video Manager – Chris Miller; Athletic Trainer – Robert Roche

*Jaime Elizondo no longer Offensive Coordinator after Week 4, Jimmie Johnson took over duties while Elizondo became the Wide Receiver's Coach
