= Falcon School =

Falcons School may refer to:

- Falcons School an independent and co-educational school in Putney, London, England
- Falcon High School located in Falcon, Colorado
- Falcon Creek Middle School a public school in Aurora, Colorado

== See also ==
- Falcon School District 49
