= Falcon, Colorado =

Unincorporated community in El Paso County, Colorado, United States

- unincorporated community
- Location of Falcon, Colorado Falcon (Colorado)
- Coordinates: 38.9330°N 104.6086°W
- Country: United States
- State: Colorado
- County: El Paso

Government
  - Type: unincorporated community
  - Body: El Paso County
- Elevation: 6,831 ft (2,082 m)

Population
  - Total: 23,007
- Time zone: UTC−07:00 (MST)
  - Summer (DST): UTC−06:00 (MDT)
- ZIP code: 80831 (Peyton)
- Area code: 719
- GNIS place ID: 193381

Falcon is an unincorporated community and a Colorado Springs exurb located in and governed by El Paso County, Colorado, United States. It lies along US 24 about 14 miles northeast of Colorado Springs. A railroad hub in the early 20th century, the town spent several decades as a quiet ranching community until it experienced rapid residential growth throughout the 1990s which has continued increasingly through today. The population of Falcon as of 2009 was estimated to be 10,514. Falcon is a part of the Colorado Springs, CO Metropolitan Statistical Area.

== History ==
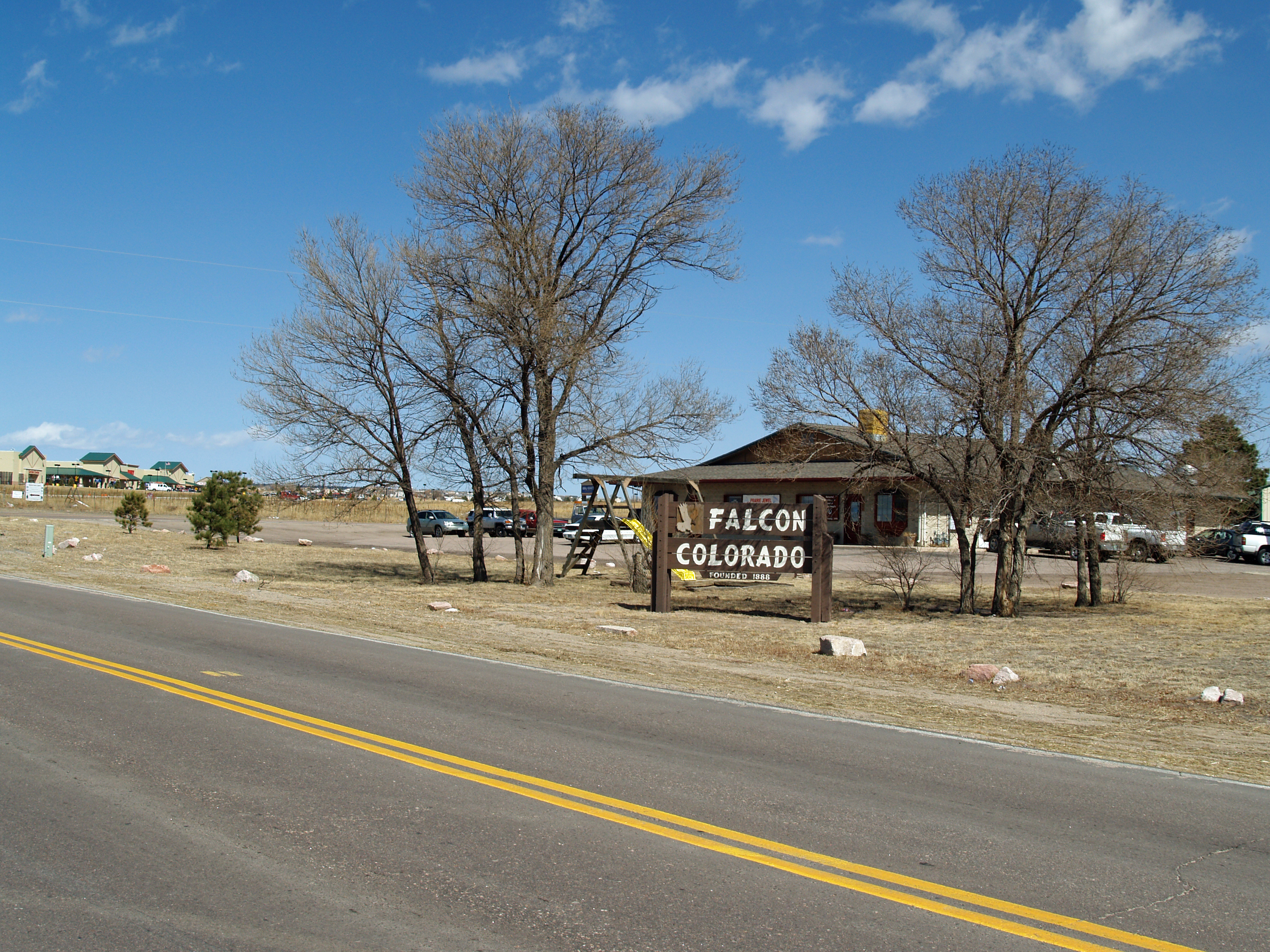
Falcon, Colorado, March 2008

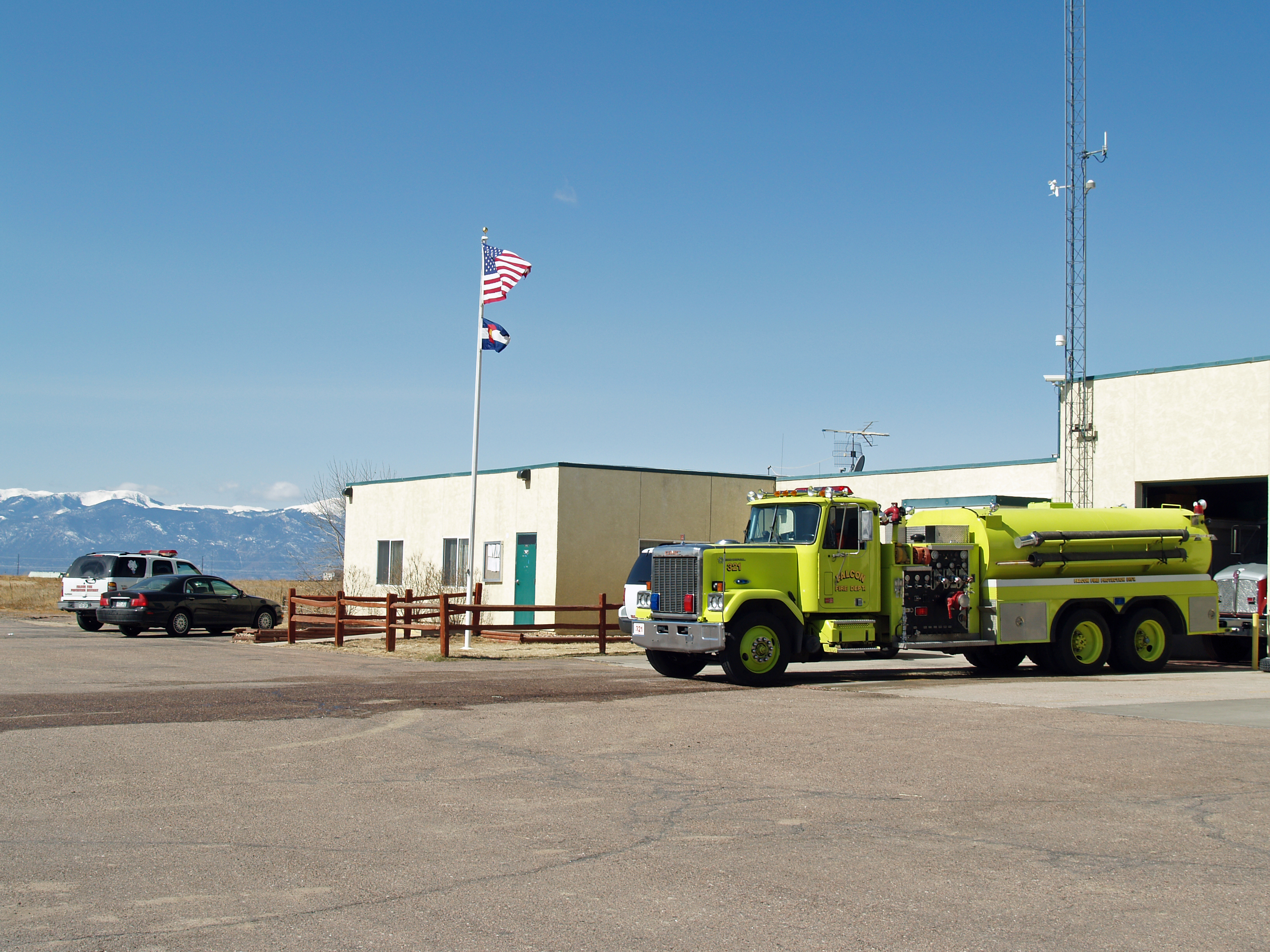
The fire station, March 2008

In 1888, the area now known as "Falcon" was crossed by the railroads: first the Denver and New Orleans on a rail bed parallel to today's Eastonville Road in 1882, then the Chicago and Rock Island on a rail bed parallel to today's U.S. Highway 24 during 1888. The lines' intersection remains an important center of the Falcon area today.

On September 20, 1888, the first announcement of "Falcon, Colorado" was advertised in the Colorado Springs Gazette. The Falcon Land and Town Company, associated with the Chicago Rock Island Railroad, were selling lots to individuals. The Falcon, Colorado, post office operated from October 10, 1888, until September 14, 1942. The Peyton, Colorado, post office (ZIP code 80831) now serves Falcon postal addresses.

By 1896, there were two hotels, a newspaper, six saloons, a pool hall, stockyards, two train depots, two general stores, a blacksmith shop and a school. The introduction of the automobile brought a decline in passenger rail traffic to Falcon. A 1935 flood washed out the Colorado & Southern tracks, which weren't rebuilt, and the Rock Island railroad junction closed. By 1975, only a small number of homes and the school remained near the Falcon intersection.

In 1984, a business complex including a convenience store and gas station was built at the intersection of Meridian Road and U.S. 24; the intersection gained a traffic light in 1996. In the early 1990s, Falcon began residential development at a rapid pace and the area's population nearly doubled between 1990 and 2000.

With the rapid growth, suburban amenities began appearing in Falcon. Safeway opened a grocery store in 2000. El Paso County approved a new Wal-Mart store in 2005 with minimal opposition. As that new retail presence was preparing to open, residents voted in May 2007 on whether to incorporate as a town. The proposal was defeated, with 78% of the vote against incorporation. The next major retail chain slated to set up shop in Falcon was Lowe's, which had agreed to procure the current site of Fire Station #1 of the Falcon Fire Protection District. Lowe's would have built a replacement station near Golden Sage Rd. and Woodmen Rd., but in September 2008 that deal fell through, and Lowe's did not complete the transaction.

== Geography ==
Falcon is 14 miles northeast of downtown Colorado Springs, which sources services that are unavailable in Falcon. Falcon is primarily a region of semi-arid steppe grassland, and has a dry season in the fall and spring with a monsoon period towards the end of summer. North of Falcon is Black Forest, a forested area primarily filled with dark evergreen and pine trees.

=== Neighborhoods ===
Falcon neighborhoods include: Antler's Ridge, The Meadows, Elkhorn Estates, Meridian Ranch, Woodmen Hills, Paint Brush Hills (which is now the name of the neighborhood formerly known as "Falcon Hills"), Falcon Heights, and Sunny Slope Estates (an older Falcon neighborhood established in the late '70s, early '80s with 5+ acre parcels zoned for livestock, bordered by Falcon Highway and East Blaney Road). This area has some springs, ponds, and older trees.

=== Airport ===
Meadow Lake Airport (FLY; ICAO: KFLY) has been in operation since 1967. It is located southeast of Highway 24 and Judge Orr Road in east Falcon. Meadow Lake is a pilot owned airport available for public use. It is designated as a general aviation reliever airport.

== Arts and culture ==
The Black Squirrel Creek Bridge, a property listed on the National Register of Historic Places, is located between Falcon and Peyton, Colorado. Because it no longer met highway safety standards, the bridge was dismantled and replaced by a newer span in 2012.

On October 16, 2010, High Prairie Library, a branch of the Pikes Peak Library District, opened to the public.

In 2004, Antler Creek Golf Course opened. Measuring 8000 yards, it is the longest golf course in Colorado and the second-longest in the nation.

== Education ==
Geographically, students are served by Falcon School District 49, but some choose to attend other school districts in El Paso County instead. District 49 currently has four high schools: Falcon High School, Vista Ridge High School, Sand Creek High School and the Patriot Learning Center. The area's rapid growth has caused the district to grow by 1,100 new students annually over the past few years.

== Religion ==
Falcon is home to many churches and religious organizations including Falcon Baptist Church, Family of Faith Lutheran Church, Gathering Stones Community Church, Grace Community Church], Meridian Point Church, Missio Dei: Falcon, Sagecreek Community Church, St. Benedict Catholic Church, The Church of Jesus Christ of Latter-day Saints, and the Thai Buddhist Wat Buddhanimit Temple.

== See also ==
- Colorado Springs, CO Metropolitan Statistical Area
- Front Range Urban Corridor
- List of populated places in Colorado
- List of post offices in Colorado
