= Jessica Killin =

American politician

Member-elect of the U.S. House of Representatives from Colorado's 5th district
- Assuming office January 3, 2027
- Succeeding: Jeff Crank

Personal details
- Born: July 28, 1973 (age 53) Colorado, U.S.
- Party: Democratic
- Spouse: Raj Date (m. 2018)
- Children: 3
- Education: University of Tampa (BA); Georgetown University (JD)

Jessica Willow Killin (born July 28, 1973) is an American politician. A member of the Democratic Party, she is the member-elect for the United States House of Representatives in Colorado's 5th congressional district.

== Early life and career ==
Killin graduated from Falcon High School in Falcon, Colorado. She enrolled at the University of Tampa on an Reserve Officers' Training Corps scholarship and served in the United States Army as a paratrooper from 1995 to 2003. She reached the rank of captain. Killin then graduated from Georgetown Law School in 2004.

Killin served as chief of staff to Marie Gluesenkamp Pérez, Carolyn Maloney, and Donna Shalala in the United States House of Representatives. She also worked as an aide to United States Senators Bill Nelson and Tom Carper and as a lobbyist for USAA. She served as chief of staff to Doug Emhoff when he was Second Gentleman of the United States.

== U.S. House of Representatives ==
In July 2025, Killin announced that she would run in the 2026 elections to represent Colorado's 5th congressional district in the United States House of Representatives. She won the primary election, defeating Joe Reagan. Killin defeated incumbent Republican Jeff Crank in the November house election. She is the first Democrat and the first woman to be elected to the U.S. House from the 5th district since its creation after the 1970 U.S. census.

== Personal life ==
Killin married Raj Date in April 2018. They have three children.

U.S. House of Representatives
Preceded by Jeff Crank	Member of the U.S. House of Representatives from Colorado's 3rd congressional district Taking office 2027	Elect
