= Banning Lewis Academy =

Location
- 9433 Vista Del Pico Boulevard; Colorado Springs, Colorado 80927; United States; 38°55′51″N 104°39′31″W

Information
- Type: Public charter school
- Motto: Every Student. Every Day.
- Established: 2006; 20 years ago
- School district: El Paso County 49
- CEEB code: 060358
- NCES School ID: 080387002027
- K–5 Principal: Jordan Voltz
- 6–12 Principal: Jamon Peariso
- Teaching staff: 115.51 (on an FTE basis)
- Grades: K–12
- Gender: Coeducational
- Enrollment: 1,697 (2024–25)
- Student to teacher ratio: 14.69
- Campus type: City
- Colors: Red and gold
- Athletics conference: Tri-Peaks League
- Mascot: Stallion
- Website: www.banningk12.org

Banning Lewis Academy (BLA) is a public K–12 charter school operating two campuses in the Banning Lewis Ranch neighborhood of Colorado Springs, Colorado. It is authorized by School District 49.

The school originally opened in 2006 as a K–8 school named Banning Lewis Ranch Academy. In 2017, the school added Banning Lewis Preparatory Academy to serve high school students. For enrollment, admission is sometimes done through a lottery.

The school's mascot is a stallion.

== History ==
The school originally first opened in August 2006. BLRA had originally hosted elementary and middle school students, until the 2017–18 year when they opened a secondary school. For a time, the Banning Lewis School Board contracted the management of the school to Mosaica Education. Accel Schools took over responsibility for the charter management contract.

== Athletics ==
Banning Lewis Academy competes in the Tri-Peaks League of the Colorado High School Activities Association, offering football, volleyball, cross country, basketball, track & field, cheer, and soccer.
