= Meadow Lake Airport (Colorado) =

- IATA: none; ICAO: KFLY; FAA LID: FLY

Summary
- Airport type: Public
- Owner: Meadow Lake Airport Association, Inc.
- Serves: Falcon-Peyton and Colorado Springs, Colorado
- Location: Unincorporated El Paso County, Colorado
- Elevation AMSL: 6,878 ft / 2,096 m
- Coordinates: 38°56′45″N 104°34′12″W
- Website: https://www.gokfly.us

Map
- Location of airport in Colorado FLY (the United States)

Runways
Direction	Length		Surface
Direction	ft	m	Surface
15/33	6,001	1,829	Asphalt
8/26	2,126	648	Asphalt/dirt
16/34	5,001	1,524	Turf

Statistics (2018)
- Aircraft operations: 67,500
- Based aircraft: 90
- Source: Federal Aviation Administration

Meadow Lake Airport (ICAO: KFLY, FAA LID: FLY, formerly 00V) is a public use airport located 14 nautical miles (16 mi, 26 km) northeast of the central business district of Colorado Springs, a city in El Paso County, Colorado, United States. It is privately owned by the Meadow Lake Airport Association, Inc.

Meadow Lake is the largest pilot owned airport in the State of Colorado. Meadow Lake Airport went in service on November 1, 1967 and is a general aviation reliever airport for Colorado Springs. There are several aviation related businesses on the airfield including flying schools and aircraft maintenance facilities. In 2010 the airport was approved for an FAA grant to provide an AWOS (automated weather observation system). The system has been installed, and it was certified by the FAA on October 21, 2010. A change of FAA identifier from 00V to FLY (ICAO: KFLY) took effect on January 14, 2011.

Although most U.S. airports use the same three-letter location identifier for the FAA and IATA, this airport is assigned FLY by the FAA, but has no designation from the IATA (which assigned FLY to Finley, New South Wales, Australia).

== Facilities and aircraft ==
Meadow Lake Airport covers an area of 757 acres (306 ha) at an elevation of 6,878 feet (2,096 m) above mean sea level. It has three runways: 15/33 is 6,001 by 60 feet (1,829 x 18 m) with an asphalt surface; 8/26 is 2,126 by 35 feet (648 x 11 m) with an asphalt/gravel surface; 16/34 is 5,001 by 200 feet (1524 x 60 m) with a turf surface.

For the 12-month period ending December 31, 2018, the airport had 67,500 aircraft operations, an average of 185 per day: 70% general aviation and 30% military. At that time there were 392 aircraft based at this airport: 339 single-engine, 22 multi-engine, 6 helicopter, 18 glider, and 7 ultralight.

== Accidents and incidents ==
On December 7, 2006, a Piper Archer crashed into a tree while attempting to land at the airport. The pilot suffered minor injuries.

On April 3, 2022, a Piper Cherokee 235 crashed at Meadow Lake Airport sending three people to the hospital.

== See also ==
- List of airports in Colorado
