= Kalen Ballage =

American football player (born 1995)

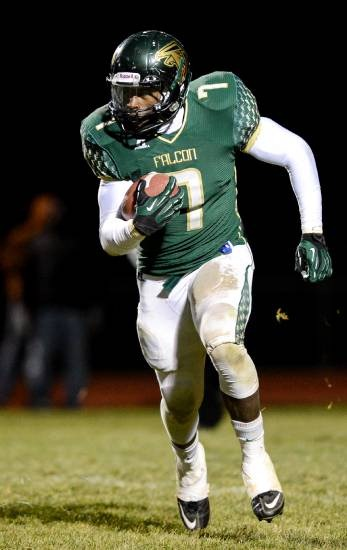
- Ballage playing at Falcon High School in 2014

Profile
- Position: Running back

Personal information
- Born: December 22, 1995 (age 30); Peyton, Colorado, U.S.
- Listed height: 6 ft 1 in (1.85 m)
- Listed weight: 222 lb (101 kg)

Career information
- High school: Falcon (Falcon, Colorado)
- College: Arizona State (2014–2017)
- NFL draft: 2018: 4th round, 131st overall pick

Career history
- Miami Dolphins (2018–2019); New York Jets (2020); Los Angeles Chargers (2020); Pittsburgh Steelers (2021); San Antonio Brahmas (2023); Arlington Renegades (2025)

Career NFL statistics
- Rushing yards: 665
- Rushing average: 3.1
- Rushing touchdowns: 7
- Receptions: 54
- Receiving yards: 293
- Stats at Pro Football Reference

Kalen Ballage (born December 22, 1995) is an American professional football running back. He played college football for the Arizona State Sun Devils and was selected by the Miami Dolphins in the fourth round of the 2018 NFL draft. He also played for the New York Jets, Pittsburgh Steelers, and Los Angeles Chargers.

== Early life ==
While attending Falcon High School in Falcon, Colorado, Ballage recorded a successful high school football career. In three years on varsity, he rushed for 2,690 yards, while averaging 8.5 yards per carry and scored 35 rushing touchdowns, in addition to 671 receiving yards and 12 receiving touchdowns. Ballage was recruited by major programs, including Michigan, Washington, and Nebraska. He committed to Arizona State on January 17, 2013.

== College career ==
As a freshman in 2014, Ballage had a combined 202 rushing and receiving yards, to go along with four total touchdowns. During his sophomore year, he had the first 100-yard rushing performance of his career against the Oregon Ducks. As a junior, Ballage tied College Football's FBS single game touchdown record by scoring eight touchdowns against Texas Tech on September 10, 2016. During his junior year, Ballage played the quarterback position while the team was in their version of the wildcat offense, known to ASU fans as the Sparky Package. Ballage is known for his combination of speed and power. He finished his college career with totals of 1,984 rushing yards, 27 rushing touchdowns, 82 receptions, 684 receiving yards, and two receiving touchdowns.

== Professional career ==
Pre-draft measurables
| Height | Weight | Arm length | Hand span | 40-yard dash | 10-yard split | 20-yard split | 20-yard shuttle | Three-cone drill | Vertical jump | Broad jump | Bench press |
|---|---|---|---|---|---|---|---|---|---|---|---|
| 6 ft 1 1/2 in (1.87 m) | 228 lb (103 kg) | 32 3/4 in (0.83 m) | 9 1/2 in (0.24 m) | 4.46 s | 1.54 s | 2.61 s | 4.35 s | 6.91 s | 33.5 in (0.85 m) | 10 ft 2 in (3.10 m) | 15 reps |
All values from NFL Combine

=== Miami Dolphins ===
Ballage was selected by the Miami Dolphins in the fourth round with the 131st overall pick of the 2018 NFL draft, using the fourth round pick previously acquired from the Philadelphia Eagles in a trade that sent Jay Ajayi to Philadelphia. In Week 4, against the New England Patriots, he made his NFL debut and recorded a three-yard rush in the 38–7 loss. In Week 15, against the Minnesota Vikings, he saw an expanded role with 12 carries for 123 yards and a touchdown. Overall, he finished his rookie season with 191 rushing yards and a touchdown.

Ballage entered the 2019 season as the No. 2 running back behind Kenyan Drake. He was placed on injured reserve on December 3, 2019, with a leg injury. He finished the season with 135 rushing yards and three touchdowns along with 14 catches for 63 yards across 12 appearances (including six starts).

On August 27, 2020, the Dolphins attempted to trade Ballage to the New York Jets in exchange for a 2021 conditional seventh-round draft pick, but the trade was voided three days later after he failed a physical with the Jets. He was waived with an injury settlement on September 5.

=== New York Jets ===
On September 15, 2020, Ballage was signed by the New York Jets. He was waived by the Jets on October 5.

=== Los Angeles Chargers ===
On October 9, 2020, Ballage was signed to the practice squad of the Los Angeles Chargers. He was elevated to the active roster on November 7 for the team's Week 9 game against the Las Vegas Raiders, and reverted to the practice squad after the game. Ballage was promoted to the active roster on November 14. In the 2020 season, he appeared in 11 games, of which he started two. Ballage finished with 91 carries for 303 rushing yards and three rushing touchdowns to go along with 29 receptions for 166 receiving yards.

=== Pittsburgh Steelers ===
Ballage signed a one-year contract with the Pittsburgh Steelers on March 30, 2021. He appeared in all 17 games for Pittsburgh during the regular season, and was used mainly in a special teams role.

On November 2, 2022, the Indianapolis Colts hosted Ballage for a workout.

=== San Antonio Brahmas ===
Ballage was selected by the San Antonio Brahmas of the XFL in the sixth round of the 2023 XFL draft. He was placed on the team's reserve list on March 24, 2023. He was removed from the roster on February 15, 2024.

=== Arlington Renegades ===
On January 17, 2025, Ballage signed with the Arlington Renegades of the United Football League (UFL). During the Renegades Week 1 game against the San Antonio Brahmas, Ballage ran for a 77-yard touchdown, the longest in UFL history. He was placed on injured reserve with a shoulder injury on May 7.

=== Louisville Kings ===
On January 13, 2026, Ballage was selected by the Louisville Kings in the 2026 UFL Draft.

== Career statistics ==
=== NFL ===
==== Regular season ====
| Year | Team | Games | | Rushing | | | | | Receiving | | | | | Fumbles | |
| Year | Team | GP | GS | Att | Yds | Avg | Lng | TD | Rec | Yds | Avg | Lng | TD | Fum | Lost |
|---|---|---|---|---|---|---|---|---|---|---|---|---|---|---|---|
| 2018 | MIA | 12 | 0 | 36 | 191 | 5.3 | 75 | 1 | 9 | 56 | 6.2 | 31 | 0 | 0 | 0 |
| 2019 | MIA | 12 | 6 | 74 | 135 | 1.8 | 8 | 3 | 14 | 63 | 4.5 | 13 | 0 | 1 | 1 |
| 2020 | NYJ | 3 | 0 | 3 | 13 | 4.3 | 5 | 0 | 9 | 67 | 7.4 | 21 | 0 | 0 | 0 |
| 2020 | LAC | 8 | 2 | 88 | 290 | 3.3 | 17 | 3 | 20 | 99 | 5.0 | 16 | 0 | 1 | 0 |
| 2021 | PIT | 17 | 0 | 12 | 36 | 3.0 | 13 | 0 | 2 | 8 | 4.0 | 6 | 0 | 0 | 0 |
| Career | | 52 | 8 | 213 | 665 | 3.1 | 75 | 7 | 54 | 293 | 5.4 | 31 | 0 | 2 | 1 |

==== Postseason ====
| Year | Team | Games | | Rushing | | | | | Receiving | | | | | Fumbles | |
| Year | Team | GP | GS | Att | Yds | Avg | Lng | TD | Rec | Yds | Avg | Lng | TD | Fum | Lost |
|---|---|---|---|---|---|---|---|---|---|---|---|---|---|---|---|
| 2021 | PIT | 1 | 0 | 4 | 13 | 3.3 | 5 | 0 | 0 | 0 | 0.0 | 0 | 0 | 0 | 0 |
| Career | | 1 | 0 | 4 | 13 | 3.3 | 5 | 0 | 0 | 0 | 0.0 | 0 | 0 | 0 | 0 |

=== XFL/UFL ===
| Year | Team | League | Games | | Rushing | | | | | Receiving | | | | |
| Year | Team | League | GP | GS | Att | Yds | Avg | Lng | TD | Rec | Yds | Avg | Lng | TD |
|---|---|---|---|---|---|---|---|---|---|---|---|---|---|---|
| 2023 | SA | XFL | 5 | 5 | 55 | 149 | 2.7 | 16 | 0 | 11 | 82 | 7.5 | 12 | 0 |
| 2025 | ARL | UFL | 6 | 5 | 65 | 306 | 4.7 | 77 | 2 | 10 | 46 | 4.6 | 15 | 0 |
| Career | | | 11 | 10 | 120 | 455 | 3.8 | 77 | 2 | 21 | 128 | 6.1 | 15 | 0 |

=== College ===
| Year | School | Conf | Class | Pos | G | Rushing | | | | Receiving | | | |
|---|---|---|---|---|---|---|---|---|---|---|---|---|---|
| Year | School | Conf | Class | Pos | G | Att | Yds | Avg | TD | Rec | Yds | Avg | TD |
| 2014 | Arizona State | Pac-12 | FR | RB | 11 | 42 | 126 | 3.0 | 3 | 6 | 64 | 10.7 | 1 |
| 2015 | Arizona State | Pac-12 | SO | RB | 10 | 125 | 653 | 5.2 | 4 | 12 | 60 | 5.0 | 0 |
| 2016 | Arizona State | Pac-12 | JR | RB | 12 | 126 | 536 | 4.3 | 14 | 44 | 469 | 10.7 | 1 |
| 2017 | Arizona State | Pac-12 | SR | RB | 13 | 157 | 669 | 4.3 | 6 | 20 | 91 | 4.6 | 0 |
| Career | Arizona State | | | | 46 | 450 | 1,984 | 4.4 | 27 | 82 | 684 | 8.3 | 2 |
