= Accel Schools =

American education company

- Headquarters: Independence, Ohio, U.S.
- Number of locations: 92, including 15 online schools (2023)
- Parent: Pansophic Learning
- Website: accelschools.com

Accel Schools, styled ACCEL Schools, is a for-profit education management organization that operates 77 charter schools and 15 online schools primarily in Ohio. Accel schools have operated on significantly lower budgets than other Cleveland schools.

== History ==
Since 2014, it has taken over schools operated by I Can, Mosaica Education, and White Hat Management. According to the Wall Street Journal ACCEL Schools was launched in 2014. That year, the online school company K12 Inc. created Pansophic Learning, financed by Safanad Limited in Dubai. Accel was formed as Pansophic Learning's American-based charter school company. In 2015, Accel became the largest charter operator in the state of Ohio, taking over 40 schools. In 2021, it had 50 schools and 23,000 students.

As of 2022, Accel's CEO was Ron Packard. Accel managed 73 charter schools, either brick and mortar or online, in Washington, Arizona, California, Colorado, Indiana, Michigan, and Ohio, and was branching into West Virginia. 64 of Accel's operated schools were in Ohio. Its real estate arm in 2022 was Global School Properties, which purchased properties and would rent them to Accel-operated schools.

Accel has been criticized for allowing its charter schools in impoverished neighborhoods to go into "unlimited debt," then paying interest to Accel for the loans.

After issuing a notice of violation under the Toxic Substances Control Act to Accel in June 2024, later that month, the EPA ordered Accel Charter Schools Network to address lead paint and asbestos concerns at three of its schools in Ohio. This included restricting building access for testing. The schools later re-opened.

In 2024, Accel operated 77 in-person public charter schools, and 15 online schools. In December 2024, there were reports from former staff members that Cornerstone Academy, an Accel-owned school, had locked children in classrooms with a "nightlock" device. Accel confirmed the claims, calling the lock-ins a "training issue" that had not been authorized.

== Performance ==
Across Ohio, Accel Schools has done well in rankings in Cleveland, however in Sandusky it isn't as high.

== Schools ==
=== Colorado ===
- Banning Lewis Preparatory Academy, Colorado Springs, Colorado

=== Ohio ===
- A+ Children's Academy, Columbus, Ohio
- Akron Preparatory School, Akron, Ohio
- Bridges Preparatory Academy, Tiffin, Ohio
- Broadway Academy At Mount Pleasant, Cleveland, Ohio
- Broadway Academy At Willow, Cleveland, Ohio
- Canton College Preparatory School, Canton, Ohio
- Capitol Collegiate Preparatory Academy, Columbus, Ohio
- Case Preparatory Academy, Akron, Ohio
- Cleveland Arts & Social Sciences Academy, Cleveland, Ohio
- Cleveland College Preparatory School, Cleveland, Ohio
- Cleveland Preparatory Academy, Cleveland, Ohio
- Columbus Arts & Technology Academy, Columbus, Ohio, K-12
- Columbus Bilingual Academy, Columbus, Ohio
- Columbus Humanities Arts & Technology Academy, Columbus, Ohio
- Constellation Schools, 7 in Cleveland, Ohio, 2 in Elyria, Ohio, 1 in Lorain, Ohio, 3 in Parma, Ohio, 1 in Parma Heights, Ohio K-12
- Cornerstone Academy, Westerville, Ohio
- East Academy, Cleveland, Ohio
- Eastland Preparatory Academy, Columbus, Ohio
- Euclid Preparatory School, Euclid, Ohio
- Fairfield Preparatory Academy, Hamilton, Ohio
- Foundation Academy, Mansfield, Ohio
- Franklin Learning Academy, Columbus, Ohio
- Hinckley Preparatory Academy, Hinckley, Ohio
- Innovative Career Academy, Cleveland, Ohio
- Lake Erie Preparatory School, Cleveland, Ohio
- Lincoln Park Academy, Cleveland, Ohio, K-8
- Lorain Bilingual Academy, Lorain, Ohio
- Lorain Preparatory Academy, Lorain, Ohio
- Lorain Preparatory High School, Lorain, Ohio
- Marion Preparatory Academy, Marion, Ohio
- Monroe Preparatory Academy, Sandusky, Ohio
- Montgomery Preparatory Academy, Dayton, Ohio
- Mount Auburn Preparatory Academy, Cincinnati, Ohio
- Niles Preparatory Academy, Niles, Ohio
- North Columbus Preparatory Academy, Columbus, Ohio
- Northcoast Academy, Cleveland, Ohio
- Northeast Ohio College Preparatory School, Cleveland, Ohio
- Northside Preparatory Academy, Cincinnati, Ohio
- Northwest School of the Arts, Cleveland, Ohio, K-8
- Ohio College Preparatory School, Maple Heights, Ohio
- Parma Academy, Parma, Ohio
- Riverside Academy, Cincinnati, Ohio
- Sagewood Preparatory Academy, Columbus, Ohio
- Sheffield Academy, Sheffield Village, Ohio
- Solon Academy, Solon, Ohio
- South Columbus Preparatory Academy at German Village, Columbus, Ohio
- South Columbus Preparatory Academy at Southfield, Columbus, Ohio
- Springfield Sports Academy, Springfield, Ohio
- STEAM Academy of Warren, Warren, Ohio
- STEAM Academy of Warrensville Heights, Warrensville Heights, Ohio, K-8
- Strongsville Academy, Strongsville, Ohio
- Toledo Preparatory Academy, Toledo, Ohio
- University Of Cleveland Preparatory School, Cleveland, Ohio
- West Park Academy, Cleveland, Ohio, K-8
- Western Toledo Preparatory Academy, Toledo, Ohio
- Western Toledo Preparatory Academy At Spring Meadows, Holland, Ohio
- Westlake Academy, Westlake, Ohio
- Wright Preparatory Academy, Canton, Ohio
- Youngstown Academy, Youngstown, Ohio

=== Michigan ===
- Barber Preparatory Academy, Highland Park, Michigan
- Inkster Preparatory Academy, Inkster, Michigan

=== West Virginia ===
- Eastern Panhandle Preparatory Academy, Kearneysville, West Virginia, K-10

=== Online ===
- Academy With Community Partners, headquartered in Mesa, Arizona
- Gateway Online Academy of Ohio, headquartered in Independence, Ohio
- Michigan Online School, headquartered in Gobles, Michigan
- OHDELA, headquartered in Independence, Ohio
- Pathfinder Career Academy of Ohio, headquartered in Independence, Ohio
- VPA (Virtual Prep Academy) @ Lucerne, headquartered in Lucerne Valley, California
- VPA of Florida, headquartered in Kissimmee, Florida
- VPA of Indiana @ Madison-Grant, headquartered in Muncie, Indiana
- VPA of Washington, headquartered in Starbuck, Washington
- VPA of West Virginia, headquartered in Kearneysville, West Virginia
- VPA of Arizona, headquartered in Mesa, Arizona
- VPA of Idaho @ D91, headquartered in Idaho Falls, Idaho
- VPA of Oklahoma, headquartered in Oklahoma City, Oklahoma
- VPA of Oregon, headquartered in Prairie City, Oregon
- VPA of Wyoming, headquartered in Diamondville, Wyoming
