= Jalen Tolliver =

American football player (born 1995)

No. 80
- Position: Wide receiver

Personal information
- Born: December 30, 1995 (age 30); Rayville, Louisiana, U.S.
- Listed height: 6 ft 3 in (1.91 m)
- Listed weight: 210 lb (95 kg)

Career information
- High school: Ouachita Parish (Ouachita Parish, Louisiana)
- College: Arkansas–Monticello
- NFL draft: 2018: undrafted

Career history
- Arizona Cardinals (2018); Tennessee Titans (2019)*; Kansas City Chiefs (2019)*; Tampa Bay Vipers (2020); Edmonton Elks (2021–2022); San Antonio Brahmas (2023)
- * Offseason or practice squad member only

Awards and highlights
- 2× First-team All-GAC (2016, 2017); Second-team All-GAC (2015)

Career NFL statistics
- Receptions: 3
- Receiving yards: 37
- Receiving touchdowns: 0
- Stats at Pro Football Reference

Career CFL statistics
- Receptions: 29
- Receiving yards: 383
- Receiving touchdowns: 4
- Stats at CFL.ca

Jalen Tolliver (born December 30, 1995) is an American former professional football player who was a wide receiver in the National Football League (NFL) and Canadian Football League (CFL). He played college football for the Arkansas–Monticello Boll Weevils, and was signed by the Arizona Cardinals as an undrafted free agent after the 2018 NFL draft and played in three games in 2019.

== College career ==
Tolliver played four seasons for the Boll Weevils at the University of Arkansas at Monticello. After catching 22 passes for 322 yards and 15 touchdowns as a freshman, Tolliver became a starter for the team going into his sophomore year and was named second-team All-Great American Conference (GAC) after recording 39 receptions for 781 yards and seven touchdowns. He led the conference in receptions (69), receiving yards (1,090), and receiving touchdowns (14) in his junior season and was named first-team All-GAC and an honorable mention All-American. As a senior, Tolliver had 67 receptions for 1,109 yards and led Division II with 16 touchdown receptions and was named a first-team All-GAC, the GAC Offensive Player of the Year and second-team All-America by the Associated Press. Over the course of his collegiate career he caught 192 passes for 3,168 yards and 39 touchdowns.

== Professional career ==
Pre-draft measurables
Height	Weight	Arm length	Hand span	40-yard dash	10-yard split	20-yard split	20-yard shuttle	Three-cone drill	Vertical jump	Broad jump	Bench press
6 ft 1 1/4 in (1.86 m)	213 lb (97 kg)	32 5/8 in (0.83 m)	8 5/8 in (0.22 m)	4.56 s	1.64 s	2.73 s	4.23 s	6.99 s	37.5 in (0.95 m)	10 ft 2 in (3.10 m)	20 reps
All values from Pro Day

=== Arizona Cardinals ===
Tolliver signed with the Arizona Cardinals as an undrafted free agent on April 30, 2018. He was cut at the end of training camp and subsequently re-signed to the team's practice squad on September 2, 2018. He was first promoted to the Cardinals' active roster on November 21, 2018, but was subsequently released three days later without appearing in a game. Tolliver was re-signed to the Cardinals' practice squad and then again promoted to the active roster on December 4, 2018. Tolliver made his NFL debut on December 9, 2018, in a 17–3 loss to the Detroit Lions, making two catches for 22 yards. He finished his rookie season with eight receptions for 110 yards in three games played. He was waived on May 9, 2019.

=== Tennessee Titans ===
On May 16, 2019, Tolliver signed with the Tennessee Titans. He was waived on August 10, 2019.

=== Kansas City Chiefs ===
Tolliver was signed by the Kansas City Chiefs on August 20, 2019. Tolliver was waived by the Chiefs during final roster cuts on August 31, 2019.

=== Tampa Bay Vipers ===
Tolliver was selected by the Tampa Bay Vipers in the fourth round in the 2020 XFL draft. Tolliver was fourth in the XFL with 297 receiving yards with 21 receptions and one touchdown before the 2020 XFL season was cancelled following growing concerns about COVID-19. He had his contract terminated when the league suspended operations on April 10, 2020.

=== Edmonton Elks ===
Tolliver signed with the Edmonton Elks of the CFL on March 4, 2021.

=== San Antonio Brahmas ===
On November 17, 2022, Tolliver was drafted by the San Antonio Brahmas of the XFL, reuniting with his former Offensive coordinator and Head coach Jaime Elizondo. He was released on March 22, 2023, but was re-signed the next day. He was placed on the team's reserve list on April 4. He was released on August 3, 2023.
