= Raj Date =

American businessman (born 1971)

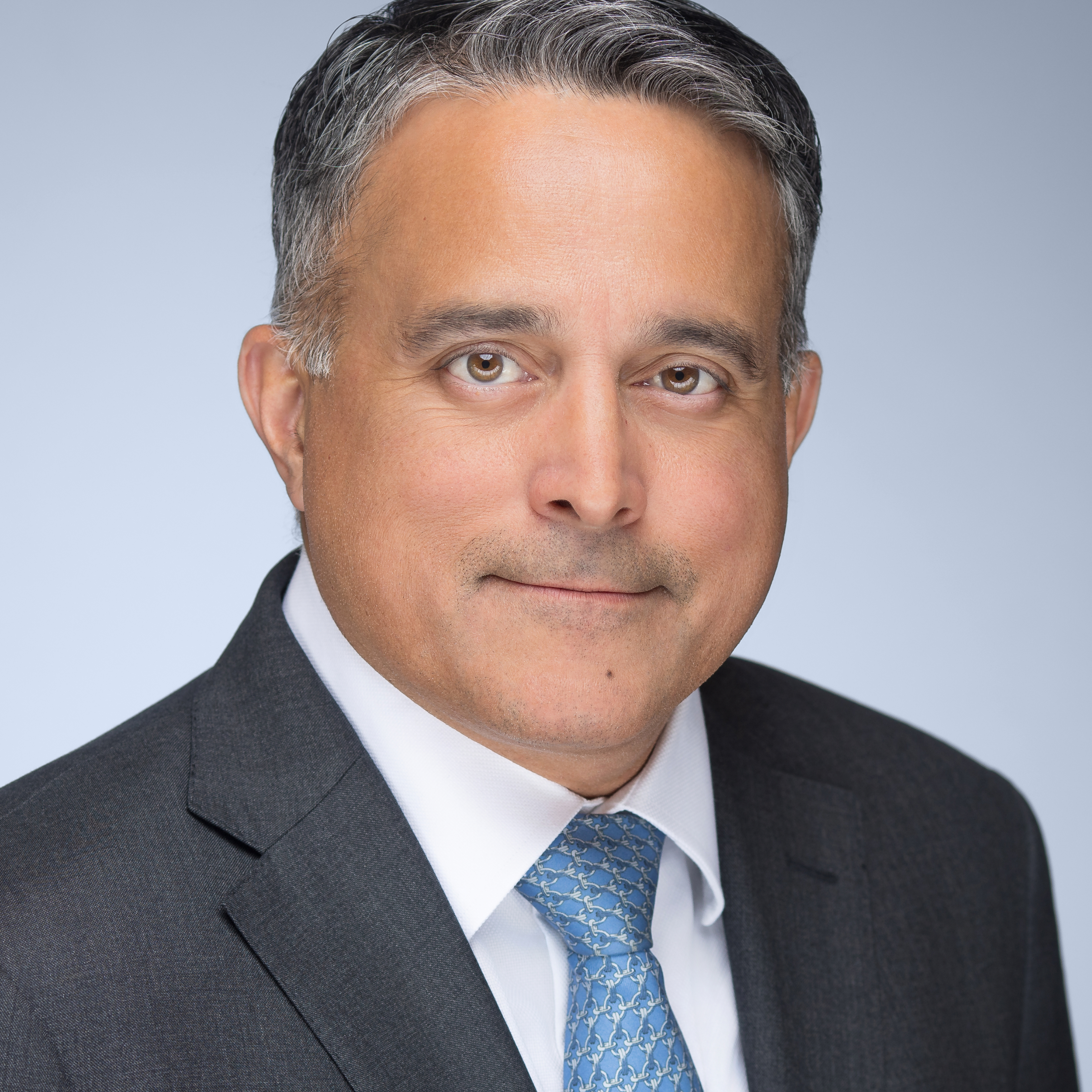
- Date in 2025

Special Advisor for the Consumer Financial Protection Bureau
- In office August 1, 2011 – January 4, 2012
- President: Barack Obama
- Preceded by: Elizabeth Warren
- Succeeded by: Richard Cordray (Director)

Personal details
- Born: March 31, 1971 (age 55)
- Spouse: Jessica Killin
- Education: University of California, Berkeley (BS); Harvard University (JD)

Rajeev V. "Raj" Date (born March 31, 1971) is an American businessman and former government official who served as Deputy Director of the Consumer Financial Protection Bureau. He had previously served in a variety of leadership positions at the Bureau, including as the startup agency's leader as the Special Advisor to the United States Secretary of the Treasury. He is credited with guiding the Consumer Financial Protection Bureau's early strategic, operational, and policy initiatives.

== Early life and education ==
Date graduated from the UC Berkeley College of Engineering in 1992, with highest honors as the department citation recipient for industrial engineering and operations research; he also earned a Juris Doctor, magna cum laude, from Harvard Law School in 1995.

== Career ==
=== Private sector ===
Prior to joining the Consumer Financial Protection Bureau, he worked as a senior vice president at Capital One and as a managing director at Deutsche Bank. He had begun his business career at the global consultancy McKinsey & Company, where he worked in the Financial Institutions Group.

Date then felt an interest in getting involved in public policy: “The only things I really knew anything about – bank balance sheets, consumer credit, capital markets – all of that was relevant from a public policy point of view in the spring of 2009” he said in an interview with Finance-Re-Wired. He left the banking industry in 2009 to start the Cambridge Winter Center, a nonprofit think tank devoted to promoting the regulation of financial firms.

=== Consumer Financial Protection Bureau (CFPB) ===
Date joined the CFPB in February 2011 as associate director of research, markets and regulations, where he oversaw work on consumer finance sectors including credit cards, auto loans, mortgages, checking and savings accounts, payday lending, and credit reporting. Date expected putting together the CFPB to be a 2–3 month endeavor, but was asked by Warren and Treasury to lead “the guts of the policy apparatus.” He succeeded Elizabeth Warren as special advisor when she stepped down on August 1, 2011, to run for Senate.

His appointment came with controversy, as it was reported that prior to joining, Date had an active role in the talks over the Dodd–Frank Wall Street Reform and Consumer Protection Act while being on the Board of Directors of Prosper Marketplace, which sought to make changes to the legislation. Date was never found to be in violation of any laws and he had always recused himself from rule-making regarding peer-to-peer lending. Date resigned from the CFPB in 2013, and was succeeded by Richard Cordray, the first Director of the agency. Date later described early CFPB as a start-up and a post-merger environment. He described the goals of the agency as twofold: “To create tangible value for people who interact with the financial services system – in other words, to really kind of help markets create value for people. It seems so pedestrian now, but coming out of the heels of the crisis it was sort of novel.” But also to “build a great institution: something that was going to have a culture and norms and talent, and a reputation for trying to do the right thing, and to try to do it in the right way.”

=== Post-CFPB career ===
After leaving the Consumer Financial Protection Bureau Date founded Fenway Summer, a hybrid advisory and venture investment firm based in Washington, D.C. Speaking about his hybrid venture capital and advisory firm, Date told American Banker, “At the time that I left Treasury and CFPB in 2013, the observation was ‘that there was a lot going on in fintech right now!’” A subsidiary of Fenway Summer is FS Vector, a spinoff firm that advises fintechs on the regulatory process: “Our public policy services assist clients with government relations strategies and educating policymakers.” Date is the co-founder and senior advisor of FS Vector. The advocacy component of FS Vector employs lobbyists and offers services in “Messaging and public affairs,” “Reputation and crisis management,” “Crafting policy goals and execution,” and “Political and regulatory intelligence.”. Fenway Summer's investment affiliates include Fenway Summer Ventures, an early-stage institutional venture capital firm.

Date has served on a number of boards of directors, including the global digital assets infrastructure firm Circle from 2013 to 2026. Date also chairs the investment committee at Fenway Summer Ventures and counsels clients through the advisory firm FS Vector.

Date has appeared as a contributor on MSNBC and CNBC.

== Personal and family ==
Born in Boston, Massachusetts, Date is the son of Dr. Usha V. Date and Dr. Vishvanath V. Date, both of whom immigrated to the United States in 1966. Date's father retired as the chief of staff of the Military Medical Center at Nellis Air Force Base in Nevada. Date is married to Jessica Killin, a member-elect to the United States House of Representatives.

Government offices
Preceded by Elizabeth Warren	Special Advisor for the Consumer Financial Protection Bureau; 2011–2012	Succeeded by Richard Cordray as Director
