= Northeast Ohio College Preparatory School =

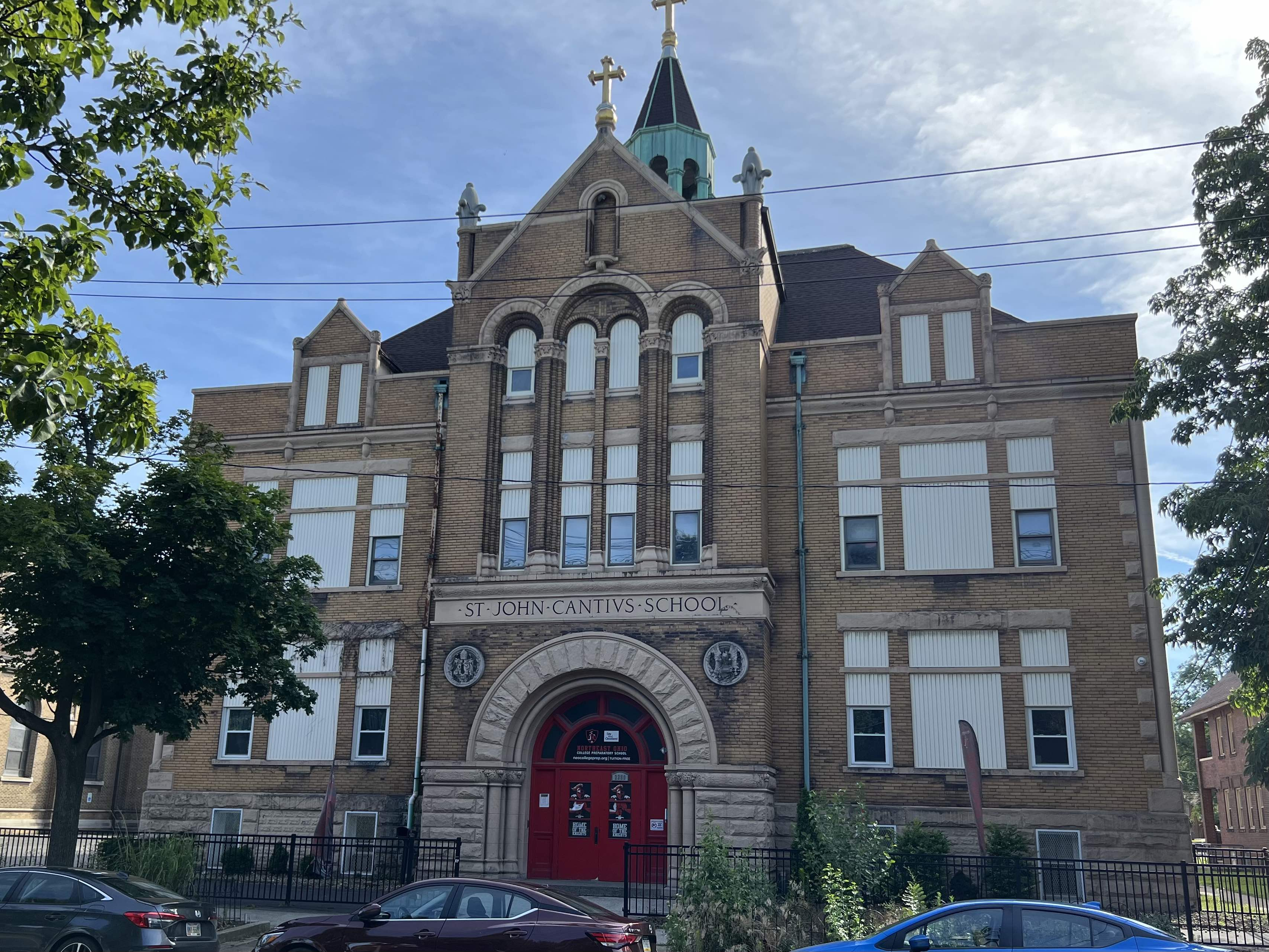

Location
- Cleveland, Ohio
- Coordinates: 41.4803007°N 81.6868856°W

Information
- Type: Charter
- NCES School ID: 390137605644
- Enrollment: 606 (2015)
- Campus: Urban
- Website: neocollegeprep.org

Northeast Ohio College Preparatory School is a K-12 charter school serving 606 students in Cleveland, Ohio.

== History ==
The school building, built in 1949, was originally St. John Cantius High School, closed in 1988. The building later housed charter school I Can School Professor Avenue.

In May 2016, teachers at the school voted to unionize, joining the American Federation of Teachers. The Center for Education Reform estimates that ten percent of charter school teachers belong to a union.

In March 2017, Accel Schools took over the charter management contract for Northeast Ohio College Preparatory School and six other I Can schools.

== Athletics ==
The school offers basketball and volleyball. The basketball team competes in the Division III Garfield Heights tournament, but is ineligible for the 2018-2019 year.
