= Falcon High School =

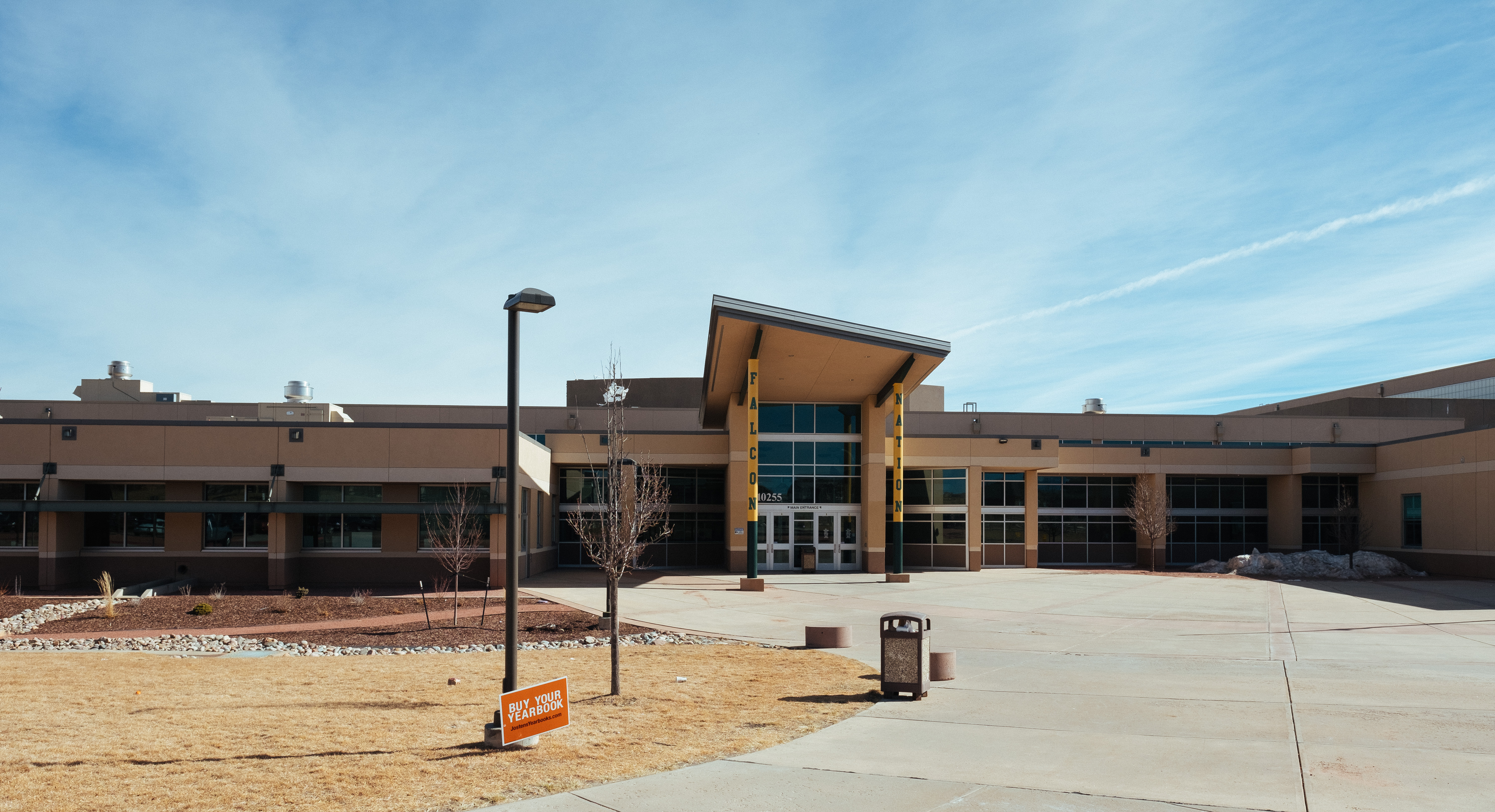

Location
- 10255 Lambert Road; Peyton, Colorado 80831; United States; 38°58′48″N 104°34′33″W

Information
- School type: Public high school
- Established: 1900; 126 years ago
- School district: El Paso County 49
- CEEB code: 061167
- NCES School ID: 080387000507
- Principal: Seann O'Connor
- Teaching staff: 59.07 (on an FTE basis)
- Grades: 9–12
- Enrollment: 1,172 (2024–25)
- Student to teacher ratio: 19.84
- Colors: Forest green and Vegas gold
- Athletics conference: CHSAA
- Mascot: Falcon
- Feeder schools: Falcon Middle School
- Website: fhs.d49.org

Falcon High School is a public high school in Falcon, Colorado. It is the oldest of the three high schools in School District 49. In the 2024–25 academic year, the school enrolled 1,172 students.

== History ==
Falcon High School was established in 1900. The school relocated to its current campus in the Meridian Ranch neighborhood in 2007.

== Academics ==
=== Enrollment ===
In the 2024–25 academic year, Falcon High School enrolled 1,172 students in the ninth through twelfth grades and employed 59.07 classroom teachers (on a full-time equivalent basis). for a student-to-teacher ratio of 19.84.

== Extracurricular activities ==
=== Athletics ===
Falcon High School is a member of the Pikes Peak Athletic Conference, Class 4A and CSML north (varies by sport). It competes in men's and women's soccer, men's football, cross country, golf, basketball, bowling, swimming, wrestling, track, baseball, women's softball, volleyball, basketball, and power lifting.

The Falcon football team were 3A state runner-ups in 2007.

== Notable alumni ==
- Kalen Ballage (class of 2013), NFL running back.
- Jessica Killin (Class of 1991), Representative-elect from Colorado's 5th Congressional District.
