= Sand Creek High School =

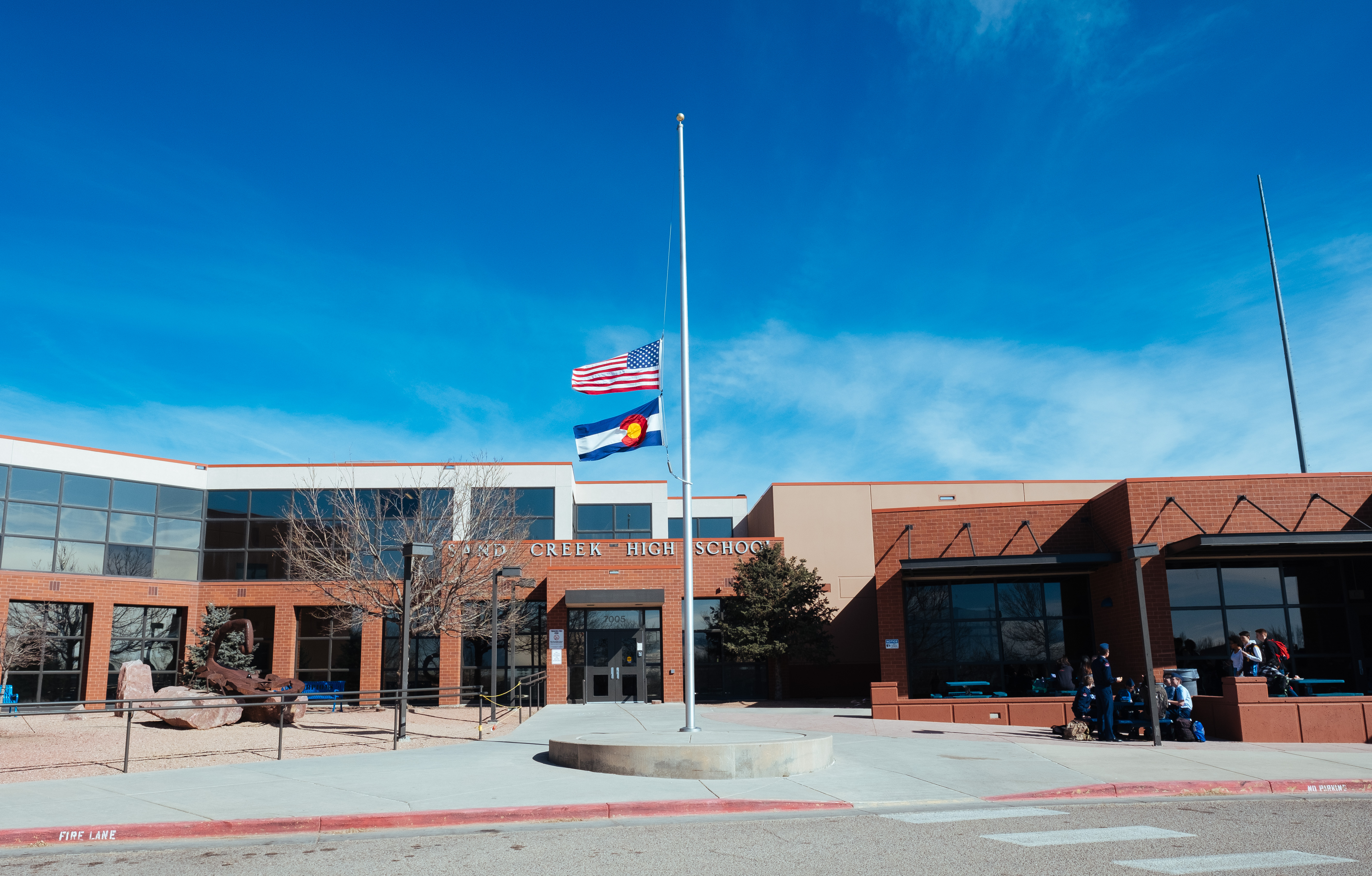
- Front of the school

Location
- 7005 North Carefree Circle; Colorado Springs, Colorado 80922; United States; 38°53′8″N 104°41′59″W

Information
- School type: Public high school
- Established: September 1997 (29 years ago)
- School district: Falcon 49
- CEEB code: 060314
- NCES School ID: 080387001594
- Principal: Amy Sanchez-Martinez
- Teaching staff: 64.46 (on an FTE basis)
- Grades: 9–12
- Enrollment: 1,381 (2023–2024)
- Student to teacher ratio: 21.42
- Colors: Cardinal, navy, silver
- Athletics conference: CHSAA
- Mascot: Scorpion
- Feeder schools: Horizon Middle School
- Website: schs.d49.org

Sand Creek High School is located in Colorado Springs, Colorado, United States, and is the second high school of Falcon School District 49. The school was built in 1997.

== Athletics ==
Sand Creek High School is a member of the Pikes Peak Athletic Conference, Class 4A. It competes in men's football, cross country, soccer, golf, tennis, basketball, wrestling, track, and baseball; and women's softball, cross country, volleyball, basketball, track, soccer, golf, and tennis. They also participate in marching band competitions, with their band reaching the semi-finals on the state level in 2007.
