= Fred Brown (wide receiver) =

American football player (born 1993)

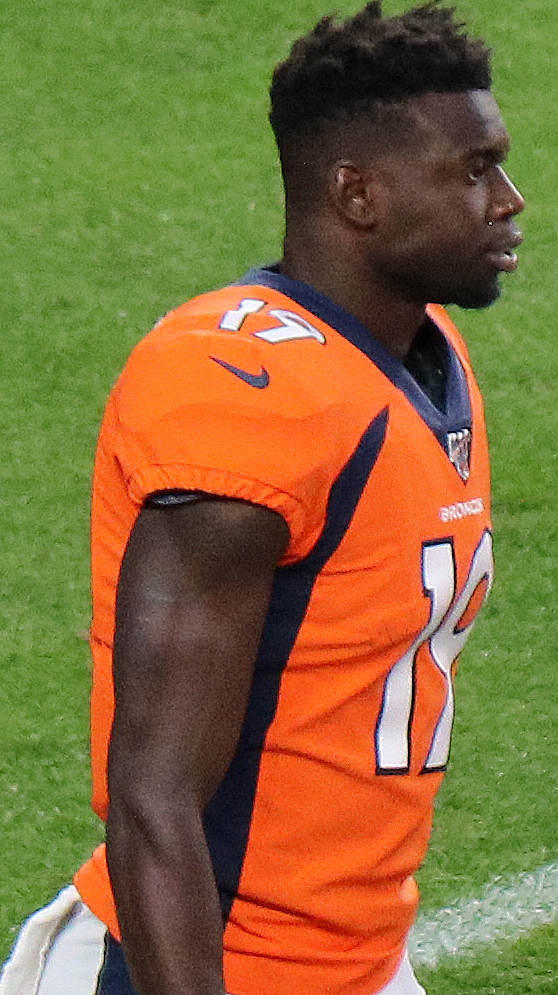
- Brown with the Denver Broncos in 2019

No. 19
- Position: Wide receiver

Personal information
- Born: December 1, 1993 (age 32); Jackson, Mississippi, U.S.
- Listed height: 6 ft 1 in (1.85 m)
- Listed weight: 195 lb (88 kg)

Career information
- High school: Jim Hill (Jackson)
- College: Mississippi State (2012–2015)
- NFL draft: 2017: undrafted

Career history
- Indianapolis Colts (2017)*; Los Angeles Rams (2017–2018)*; Denver Broncos (2019–2020); Tennessee Titans (2021)*; San Antonio Brahmas (2023)
- * Offseason or practice squad member only

Career NFL statistics
- Receptions: 2
- Receiving yards: 21
- Stats at Pro Football Reference

Frederick Brown (born December 1, 1993) is an American former professional football player who was a wide receiver in the National Football League (NFL). He played college football for the Mississippi State Bulldogs.

== Early life ==
Brown was born and grew up in Jackson, Mississippi. He attended Jim Hill High School, where he played high school football. As a junior, Brown caught 35 passes for the Tigers and accumulated over 1,000 all purpose yards. He had 23 receptions for 419 yards and five touchdowns while also returning 20 kicks for 380 yards in his senior season. Brown, rated a three-star recruit by most recruiting services, committed to play college football at Mississippi State University over Ole Miss and Memphis.

== College career ==
Brown was a member of the Mississippi State Bulldogs for four seasons, redshirting his true freshman season. He became MSU's third starter at receiver as a redshirt junior, catching 27 passes for 412 yards and three touchdowns. Brown was dismissed from the team shortly before the beginning of his redshirt senior season due to a student honor code violation. He finished his collegiate career with 50 receptions for 785 yards and five touchdowns in 23 games played.

== Professional career ==
Pre-draft measurables
Height	Weight	Arm length	Hand span	40-yard dash	10-yard split	20-yard split	20-yard shuttle	Three-cone drill	Vertical jump	Broad jump	Bench press
6 ft 0 7/8 in (1.85 m)	199 lb (90 kg)	32 1/2 in (0.83 m)	9 1/4 in (0.23 m)	4.48 s	1.52 s	2.57 s	4.32 s	6.82 s	37.0 in (0.94 m)	9 ft 10 in (3.00 m)	13 reps
All values from Pro Day

=== Indianapolis Colts ===
Brown signed with the Indianapolis Colts as an undrafted free agent on June 15, 2017. He was waived by the Colts at the end of training camp and re-signed to the team's practice squad a few weeks later on September 3, 2017.

=== Los Angeles Rams ===
Following the end of the 2017 season, Brown signed a reserve/futures contract with the Los Angeles Rams on January 8, 2018. He was cut at the end of training camp and did not spend the 2018 regular season with any team.

=== Denver Broncos ===
Brown signed a futures contract with the Denver Broncos on December 31, 2018. Brown was waived at the end of training camp and re-signed to the practice squad on September 1, 2019. He was promoted to the active roster on September 24, 2019. Brown made his NFL debut on September 29, 2019, against the Jacksonville Jaguars. Brown caught his first career catch, a five-yard reception from Joe Flacco, on October 12, 2019, in a 16–0 win against the Tennessee Titans.

On September 5, 2020, Brown was waived by the Broncos, but was signed to the practice squad the following day. He was elevated to the active roster on October 31 for the team's week 8 game against the Los Angeles Chargers and reverted to the practice squad after the game. He signed a reserve/future contract on January 4, 2021. On February 2, 2021, the Broncos waived Brown.

=== Tennessee Titans ===
On May 4, 2021, Brown signed with the Tennessee Titans. He was waived on August 31, 2021.

=== San Antonio Brahmas ===
Brown signed with the San Antonio Brahmas of the XFL for the 2023 season. He had a kickoff return for a touchdown in a week 7 game against the Vegas Vipers. He was not part of the roster after the 2024 UFL dispersal draft on January 15, 2024.
