= Pansophic Learning =

School management company

Pansophic Learning LLC
- Company type: Limited Liability Company
- Industry: For-profit education
- Founded: 2014; 12 years ago
- Founder: Ronald J. Packard
- Headquarters: McLean, Virginia, United States
- Area served: United States, Switzerland, and the United Kingdom
- Subsidiaries: Accel Schools
- Website: pansophiclearning.com

Pansophic Learning is a for-profit charter management organization with schools in the United States, Switzerland, and the United Kingdom. Pansophic is based in McLean, Virginia. Its Accel Schools subsidiary is the largest charter school operator in Ohio.

== History ==
Pansophic was founded in 2014 by Ronald J. Packard, who had founded Stride, Inc. in 1999. A 2015 acquisition made Pansophic the largest charter school operator in Ohio, with twelve schools and 3,286 students. It took over White Hat Management's vendor operated school contracts.

In 2014, the company bought the International School of Berne (Switzerland).

The company supplies the curricula for six schools operated by the Aurora Academies Trust in the United Kingdom.
