= Mosaica Education =

Charter management organization

Mosaica Education, Inc.
- Type: Charter management organization
- Industry: Education
- Founded: 1997
- Founder: Dr. Dawn Eidelman and Gene Eidelman
- Headquarters: Atlanta, Georgia, United States
- Area served: Global (US, UK, India, Mexico, etc)
- Products: Curriculum, School Model, Education Services
- Services: School Management, Education Consulting, Online Schooling, Education Professional Development, Education Turn Arounds, Curriculum
- Number of employees: 1,800
- Parent: Pansophic Learning (as of 2015)
- Divisions: Mosaica Online, Mosaica Turnaround Partners, Mosaica International Schools, Mosaica Education UK, Paragon
- Website: mosaicaeducation.com

Mosaica Education, Inc. is an education management organization that operates preschool, elementary, middle and high school programs in the United States, United Kingdom and India in addition to other countries through Mosaica Online. Mosaica Education was founded in 1997. It acquired Advantage Schools, Inc., in 2001. Mosaica Education's primary focus is developing charter school programs in the United States that use its proprietary Paragon curriculum. Mosaica Education is co-headquartered in New York City and Atlanta, Georgia. The organization employs more than 1,800 people, primarily at the school-site level, and operates 104 programs for 25,000 students worldwide as of November 2013. Michael J. Connelly is Mosaica's chief executive officer.

The company's educational assets were taken over by Pansophic Learning in 2015. No Mosaica-branded schools remain.

== History ==
=== Early history ===
Mosaica was co-founded in 1997 by Dr. Dawn Eidelman and Gene Eidelman. The Eidelmans had previously founded Prodigy Child Development Centers and Prodigy Consulting, an organization that operated child development and care centers in the Atlanta, Georgia area and for corporations across the United States including General Motors, IBM and Xerox. Dr. Dawn Eidelman also formerly served as a professor at the University of Texas at Arlington. In September 1997, Mosaica opened its first charter school. Lepercq Capital Management purchased a stake of the company in 1998. Along with the investment, Michael Connelly, a former president of Lepercq, became Mosaica's chief executive officer. The company received further funding from Murphy and Partners in 1999.

=== 2000s ===
In 2001, Mosaica acquired Advantage Schools, a Boston, Massachusetts-based education management organization. The Qatari government contracted Mosaica to convert schools in Qatar to an American-style educational curriculum in 2003. The contract was renewed in 2006. By 2005, Mosaica was the fastest growing urban business in the country, according to Inc. Magazine. The company operated 51 charter schools at the time.

In 2004 and 2007, Mosaica was recognized as one of the Outstanding Charters Schools in America. Mosaica was one of two education organizations to appear on the 2004 "Inc 5000" list.

In 2006, Mosaica Education was selected by the government of Abu Dhabi as one of four private education firms to consult on 30 government schools in the Abu Dhabi Education Council (ADEC). The Public-Private Partnership (PPP) program was considered successful in 2010 when ADEC reported that "there has been a considerable rise in student and teacher attendance and grades specifically in English, Math, and Arabic language skills."

In 2006, Mosaica was paid $773,000 for the first year of a five-year management contract for the management of Lafayette Academy Charter School in New Orleans, Louisiana. The organization was fired in 2007 by the school's governing board, which alleged that Mosaica failed to align its curriculum to Louisiana state standards, provide after-school programs for students that were below grade level, and organize transportation to and from the school. The dispute between Mosaica and Lafayette Academy went into arbitration. In September 2007, the arbitrator ruled Lafayette Academy would pay Mosaica $100,000 for early termination of the contract and Mosaica would return $350,000 in fees to the school.

In 2009, Mosaica fired one school administrator and two teachers at Howard Road Academy, a charter school managed by the organization. The administrator had leaked a copy of the DC-CAS standardized test to two teachers, who then distributed copies of the test to their students prior to the exam day.

=== 2010s ===
In 2010, the MAPSA (Michigan Association of Public School Academies) recognized Bingham Arts with the Charter School of Excellence Award for the state of Michigan. The Columbus Preparatory Academy was recognized as a 'School of Excellence with Distinction' by the Ohio Department of Education in 2011.

In 2012, a charter school managed by Mosaica Education received the Illinois State Board of Education's "Academic Improvement Award." A charter school managed by Mosaica Education received the 2012 Colorado "Governors' Distinguished Improvement Award" for exceeding academic expectations.

In April 2012, the Winston-Salem Journal reported that the STEAM Academy of Winston-Salem, North Carolina had faced declining revenue and poor academic performance for multiple years. Mosaica took over management of the charter school in late 2011. The STEAM Academy's board of directors hired Susan Willis to serve as the school's principal in December of that year. Willis had been fired in 2009 from Fleming High School in Roanoke, Virginia for allegedly manipulating student schedules to influence the school's standardized testing scores. Mosaica was aware of Willis' firing but felt that Willis was "cleared of any wrongdoing" after the company spoke to a former Roanoke school superintendent and consulted a dissenting opinion from the Virginia state investigation into Willis' conduct.

Also in 2012, Mosaica was contracted to manage a charter district in Muskegon Heights, Michigan by Donald Weatherspoon, the emergency manager of the failing district. Prior to contracting with Mosaica, Weatherspoon had fired the entire staff of the school district and reconstituted it as a charter district. Mosaica had "three months to hire and train staff members, including those rehired from the old district, bring neglected facilities up to code, and persuade parents to keep their children enrolled." The school's first principal quit within the first month of that school year and, within three months, a quarter of the teachers hired by Mosaica in the summer had left the district. According to Education Week, "the largest single proportion [of teachers who left the district]—28 percent—cited the charter district's lack of participation in Michigan's public school employee retirement plan as the reason [for leaving]."

In 2013, a charter school managed by Mosaica Education is recognized by the Ohio Department of Education as a "High Progress School of Honor." As of 2013, Atlanta Preparatory Academy, a charter school managed by Mosaica, ranked in the bottom 20% of schools in Georgia based on standardized testing scores. Atlanta Public Schools recommended that the Georgia Board of Education not renew the school's charter due to low standardized test scores. The public school district was also concerned that the charter school's board lacked sufficient independence because it owed $801,384 to Mosaica.

== Divisions ==
Mosaica Education is the parent organization that manages US-based charter schools and provides education consulting services. Additionally, there are five divisions within the organization:

Mosaica Online

Mosaica Online (formerly known as Mercury Online Education) is a virtual education program available to students domestically and internationally. Students attend classes and interact with peers and teachers through an online learning management system. In addition to offering virtual schools, Mosaica Online also partners with schools looking to offer online courses on an à la carte basis.

Mosaica Turnaround Partners Mosaica Turnaround Partners is a consultant for schools and school districts facing a wide range of educational challenges. Mosaica Turnaround Partners assist school administrators with rescuing their academic programs from failure. Mosaica Turnaround Partners use professional development, research and tracking to improve the academic achievement of schools focusing on predominantly at risk student populations.

Mosaica International Schools Mosaica International Schools (formerly known as Mosaica American Schools) is Mosaica Education's division that operates private international schools located outside of the United States. Mosaica currently operates one school in Hyderabad, India, although a school in Gurgaon had been planned in 2011.

Mosaica Education UK Mosaica Education UK provides school management, professional development and education consulting services to schools and governments within the United Kingdom. At present Mosaica Education UK operates four academies in England under the Aurora Academies Trust.

Paragon Paragon is an accelerated learning program that replaces traditional social studies, history, geography and civics curriculum at the primary and secondary school levels. Paragon also integrates the Visual and Performing Arts. Paragon supports scholarship in all subject areas by emphasizing pedagogies such as inquiry-based learning. Paragon was developed by Dr. Dawn Eidelman and is one of the eight pillars in Mosaica's accredited school model.

== Paragon ==
One distinction of Mosaica Education is the use of its proprietary Paragon curriculum instead of traditional social studies in nearly all of its schools. Paragon was designed by Mosaica's co-founder Dr. Dawn Eidelman.

In a Michigan Radio article, some Mosaica students described the program as fun. The same article quotes a former teacher as saying that Paragon has a one-size-fits-all approach that incorporated a "strict" teaching schedule making it hard for students to gain an understanding of the material or develop teacher / student relationships.

An article published in May 2013 in The Observer commented that the Paragon curriculum appeared to be at odds with British Secretary of State for Education Michael Gove's views of how history should be taught in the [British] curriculum. Gove's comment pertained to secondary students. The article also referred to a 2003 study conducted by the American Federation of Teachers union, which suggested that self-evaluation measures taken by the school to demonstrate Paragon effectiveness had inflated student scores, a claim denied by the organization.

In February 2014, the Manav Rachna International School - Charmwood, which uses Paragon curriculum, received the Associated Chambers of Commerce and Industry of India (ASSOCHAM) National Education Excellence Award for the "Best K-12 School in Teaching and Learning Practices."

In May 2014, the UK Office of Standards in Education (Ofsted) changed its rating of King Offa Primary Academy from "Special Measures" to "Good" and praised its use of Paragon curriculum.

== Awards and recognition ==
In 2000, co-founder Dr. Dawn Eidelman received the Ten Outstanding Young Americans (TOYA) Award. In 2003, the United States Department of Education recognized Mosaica Education as an "Education Innovator". Mosaica was recognized on the Inner-City 100 list for 4 consecutive years (2004–2007), including the #1 spot in 2005.

Mosaica appeared on the 2005, 2007, 2009, and 2010 "Inc. 5000" list. In 2011, it was recognized by Inc. Magazine as one of the "Top Education Companies".

In 2007, Mosaica Education received the Inner City Impact Award (ICIC). Mosaica co-founders Gene and Dr. Dawn Eidelman were recognized in 2009 as Education Entrepreneurs of the Year.

Mosaica was recognized on AllWorld Network's Arabia FastGrowth 500 list in 2011 and 2012. Michael Connelly received the AllWorld Entrepreneur of the Year in 2011. In 2013, the USDLA awarded Dr. Dawn D. Eidelman for "Outstanding Leadership by an Individual in the Field of Distance Learning" Award. Mosaica received the Top Homeschooling Curriculum Award in 2013.
