= School District 49 (Colorado) =

School district in Colorado, United States

Falcon School District 49

Address
- 10850 East Woodmen Road Peyton, Colorado, 80831; United States
- Coordinates: 38°56′27″N 104°37′36″W

District information
- Type: Public school district
- Grades: Pre-K–12
- Schools: 27
- NCES District ID: 0803870

Students and staff
- Students: 20,834
- Teachers: 1,037.85
- Student–teacher ratio: 20.07

Other information
- Website: www.d49.org

School District 49 (D49) is a public school district located in north-central El Paso County, Colorado, United States, serving eastern Colorado Springs and Falcon. In 2025, with 27,000 students, it was the 10th-largest school district in Colorado.

In April 2025, the D49 school board voted 3-2 to advance the Preserving Fairness and Safety in Sports policy banning transgender girls from girls sports and transgender boys from boys sports.

== List of schools ==
=== Elementary schools ===
- Bennett Ranch Elementary School
- Evans International Elementary School
- Falcon Elementary School of Technology
- Meridian Ranch Elementary School
- Odyssey Elementary School
- Remington Elementary School
- Ridgeview Elementary School
- Springs Ranch Elementary School
- Stetson Elementary School
- Woodmen Hills Elementary School
- Inspiration View Elementary School

=== Middle schools ===
- Falcon Middle School
- Horizon Middle School
- Skyview Middle School

=== High schools ===
- Falcon High School
- Sand Creek High School
- Vista Ridge High School

=== Alternative schools ===
- Academy for Literacy, Learning & Innovation Excellence
- Patriot High School
- Pikes Peak Early College
- Springs Studio for Academic Excellence

=== Charter schools ===
- Banning Lewis Ranch Academy
- GOAL High School
- Liberty Tree Academy
- Grand Peak Academy
- James Irwin Elementary School
- Mountain View Academy
- Pikes Peak School Expeditionary Learning
- Pioneer Technology & Arts Academy
- Power Technical
- Rocky Mountain Classical Academy

== See also ==
- List of school districts in Colorado
