= Vista Ridge High School (Colorado) =

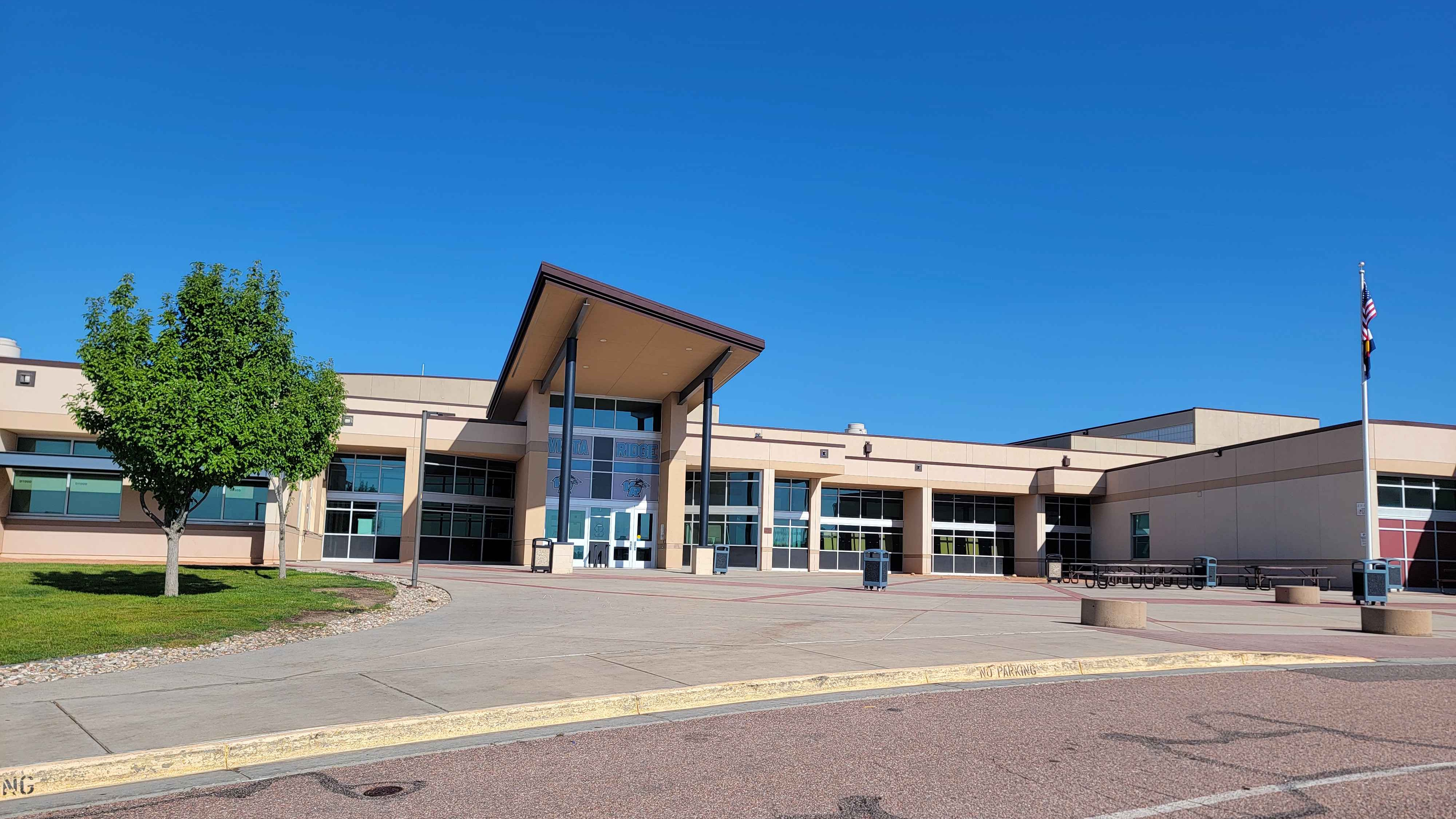

Location
- 6888 Black Forest Road; Colorado Springs, Colorado 80923; United States
- Coordinates: 38°55′54″N 104°42′11″W

Information
- School type: Public high school
- Established: 2008; 18 years ago
- School district: El Paso County 49
- CEEB code: 060349
- NCES School ID: 080387006408
- Principal: Tom Payne
- Teaching staff: 74.13 (on an FTE basis)
- Grades: 9–12
- Gender: Coeducational
- Enrollment: 1,473 (2024–25)
- Student to teacher ratio: 19.87
- Colors: Carolina blue and black
- Athletics conference: CHSAA
- Mascot: Wolf
- Feeder schools: Skyview Middle School
- Website: vrhs.d49.org
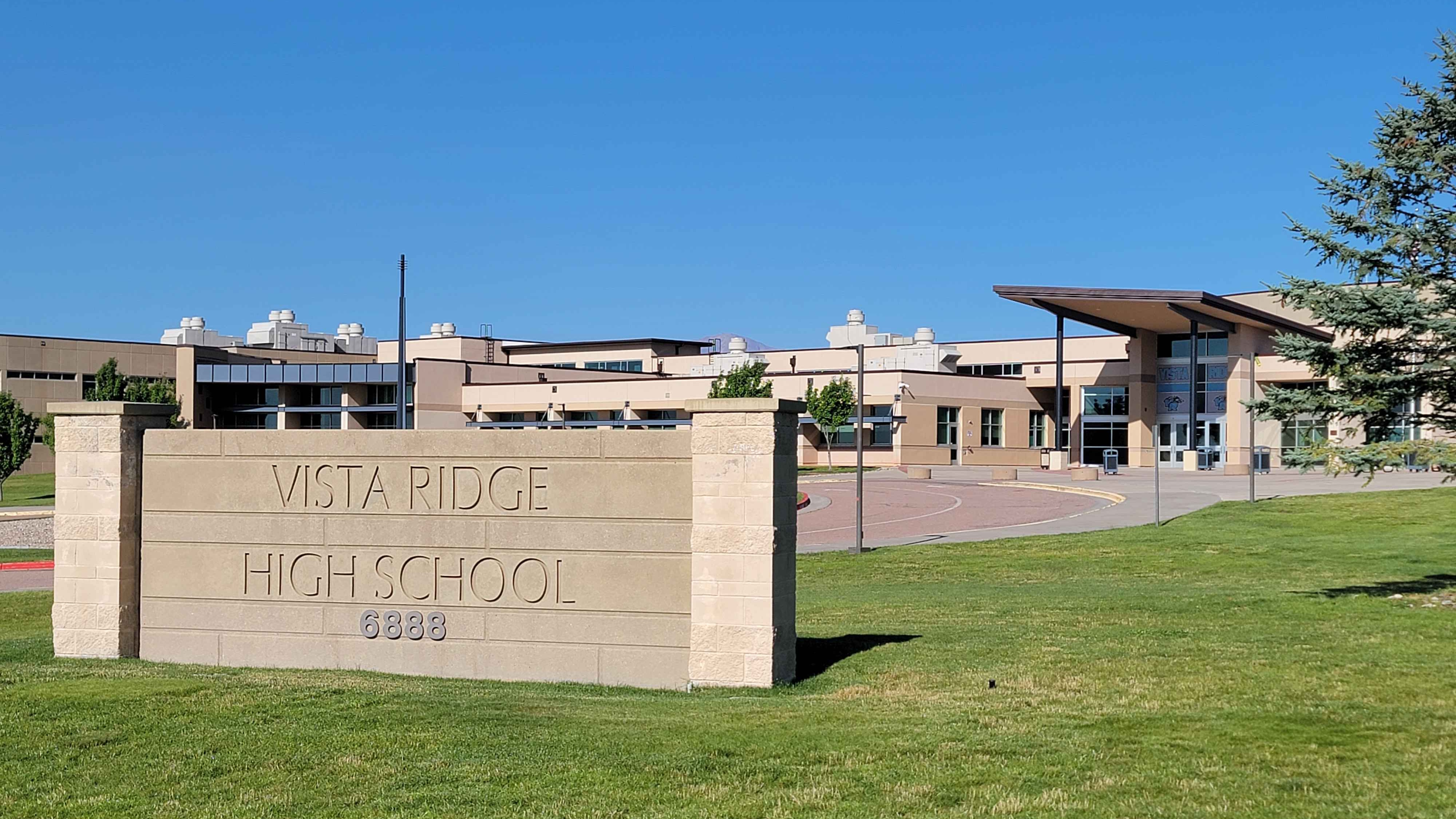

Vista Ridge High School is a public high school in Colorado Springs, Colorado. It is one of three high schools in School District 49.

== Admissions ==
In the 2024–25 academic year, there were 1,473 students enrolled at Vista Ridge.

== Extracurricular activities ==
The Wolfpack Theater Company hosts two theater productions each year, with one being a play and the other being a musical.

Vista Ridge sports include football, cross country, volleyball, soccer, basketball, wrestling, softball, track and field, cheer, and golf.

== Awards and recognition ==
- 2013: Boys' Track and Field State Champions
- 2017: Boys' Track and Field State Champions

== Notable alumni ==
- Hunter Maldonado, basketball player
