= Peyton, Colorado =

Census-designated place in El Paso County, CO, USA

- Census-designated place
- Location of the Peyton CDP in El Paso County, Colorado
- Coordinates: 39°01′59″N 104°29′25″W
- Country: United States
- State: Colorado
- County: El Paso County

Government
  - Type: unincorporated community

Area
  - Total: 2.297 sq mi (5.950 km^{2})
  - Land: 2.297 sq mi (5.950 km^{2})
  - Water: 0 sq mi (0.000 km^{2})
- Elevation: 6,877 ft (2,096 m)

Population (2020)
  - Total: 214
  - Density: 93.2/sq mi (36.0/km^{2})
- Time zone: UTC-7 (MST)
  - Summer (DST): UTC-6 (MDT)
- ZIP Code: 80831
- Area code: 719
- GNIS feature ID: 2583278

Peyton is an unincorporated town, a post office, and a census-designated place (CDP) located in and governed by El Paso County, Colorado, United States. The CDP is a part of the Colorado Springs, CO Metropolitan Statistical Area. The Peyton post office has the ZIP Code 80831. At the United States Census 2020, the population of the Peyton CDP was 214.

== History ==
Peyton was settled by George Peyton in 1888 and was surveyed and platted on December 25 of that year. Originally called Mayfield, the settlement was renamed Peyton after the post office had been refused under that name because there was already a Mayfield, California.

Among the first settlers of Peyton were James and Susan McDermott. With the coming of the Rock Island Railroad they settled in Calhan in 1888 and in 1890 moved to Peyton where Mr. McDermott was the first postmaster and ran a general store for 25 years. His home, which still stands at the southwest corner of Main and Front Streets, was a popular boarding house.

A few years later, Russell Gates opened a mercantile store. He had previously established general stores in Limon, Calhan, Eastonville, Elbert and Elizabeth, Colorado. These enterprises carried everything from pins to coffins plus running a creamery. The store closed in 1920. At one time, there were five general stores in Peyton, one of which also sold gasoline.

By 1900, 50 people lived in Peyton. While farming and coal mining comprised the main occupation, supporting services included a blacksmith, physician, general store, creamery, hotel, and clergy. Joseph Zimmerman built a hall above a storage building attached to the Gates store. This meeting place hosted Odd Fellows, Modern Woodmen, elections, community dances, and fundraising events.

The first telephone in Peyton arrived in 1904. It ran on a dry cell battery and had a crank to turn to get your party. Telephone lines ran as the top strand on the barbed wire fences. Eventually, the area had enough phones that a central switchboard was installed. Mrs. George Hayes became the switchboard operator until 1922.

In 1923, a devastating fire took out several buildings, a number of automobiles and the stock in a general store. The town was rebuilt and by the 1930s boasted 13 businesses.

In 1945, the original railroad depot was torn down and replaced with a new one. Ten years later, by 1955, that depot was no longer needed, and the railroad subsequently sold it to the Methodist Church in 1958. They tore it down and used the materials for an addition to their church.

When the school house burned down in 1954, Peyton residents were alarmed that they didn't have their own fire protection. A group of people met at the Grange Hall and created the Peyton Volunteer Fire Department. The town chose their board members and Clarence Cook became the first Fire Chief. A few months later, by-laws were drawn up and regular meetings established. To support their activities, the Department held benefits such as dances or street carnivals. Eventually, they raised enough money to build a fire station. The department continues today as an all volunteer department.

In June 1965, a flood badly damaged the railroad tracks in the Peyton area. The water washed out 500 feet of fill beneath the track, leaving it suspended in mid-air. The flood also damaged the underpass east of Peyton by taking out several tons of concrete supports leaving that track several feet above the original road base. It took county, state, and railroad crews working double shifts to make the necessary repairs to make the tracks operational again.

== Geography ==
The Peyton CDP has an area of 1,470 acres (5.950 km^{2}), all land.

== Demographics ==
The United States Census Bureau initially defined the Peyton CDP for the United States Census 2010.

Peyton CDP, Colorado
Year	Pop.	±%
2010	250	—
2020	214	−14.4%
Source: United States Census Bureau

== Arts and culture ==
- The Black Squirrel Creek Bridge, a property formerly listed on the National Register of Historic Places, was located between Peyton and Falcon, Colorado. The bridge was dismantled and replaced in 2012.
- The Homestead Ranch Regional Park is located in Peyton with facilities that include a playground and hiking trails.

== Education ==
The Peyton School District 23JT covers the Peyton CDP. The Falcon School District 49 covers the Falcon area and nearby areas of Colorado Springs.

== Notable people ==
- Kalen Ballage, NFL running back, attended Falcon High School
- Lisa Joann Thompson, dancer and actress

== See also ==
- South Central Colorado Urban Area
- Colorado Springs, CO Metropolitan Statistical Area
