= Jaime Elizondo =

Professional Canadian football coach

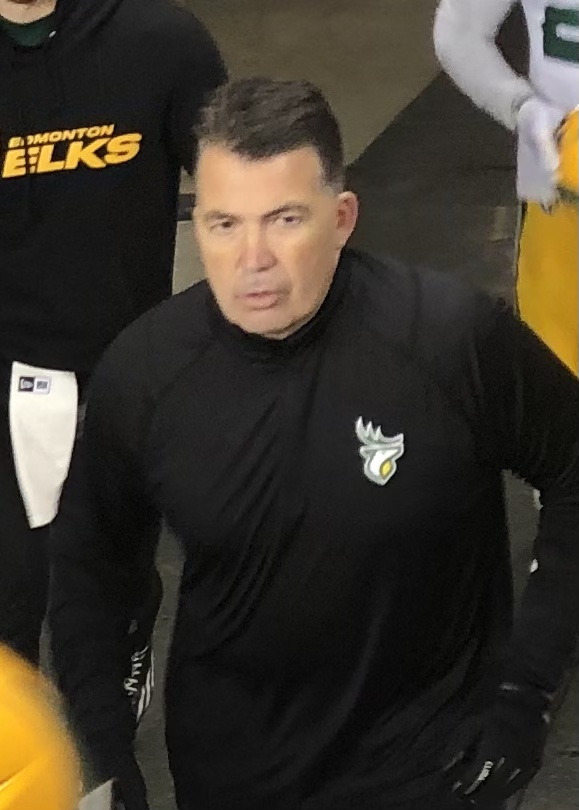
- Elizondo with the Edmonton Elks in 2021

Personal information
- Born: Aguascalientes, Mexico

Career information
- College: University of Maryland

Career history
- 1998–2000: Georgetown Prep (Defensive coordinator, secondary coach)
- 2001–2002: Catholic University Cardinals (Special teams coach, secondary coach)
- 2002–2004: William & Mary Tribe (Tight ends coach, special teams coach)
- 2004–2008: Hofstra Pride (Special teams coordinator, wide receivers coach)
- 2008: Montreal Alouettes (Wide receivers coach, special teams coach)
- 2009: Syracuse Orange (Wide receivers coach)
- 2010–2011: Toronto Argonauts (Offensive coordinator, quarterbacks coach)
- 2012–2014: Columbia Lions (Offensive coordinator, quarterbacks coach)
- 2015: Toronto Argonauts (Wide receivers coach)
- 2016–2018: Ottawa Redblacks (Offensive coordinator, quarterbacks coach)
- 2020: Tampa Bay Vipers (Offensive coordinator)
- 2021: Edmonton Elks (Head coach, offensive coordinator, quarterbacks coach)
- 2023: San Antonio Brahmas (Offensive coordinator)
- 2023: San Antonio Brahmas (Wide receivers coach)

Awards and highlights
- Grey Cup champion (2016)

Jaime Elizondo is an American football and a Canadian football coach. Elizondo has had 25 years of coaching experience in both collegiate and professional levels, most recently serving as the head coach, offensive coordinator, and quarterbacks coach of the Edmonton Elks of the Canadian Football League (CFL) during the 2021 CFL season. Elizondo previously served as the offensive coordinator for the Tampa Bay Vipers and the Ottawa Redblacks where he was a Grey Cup champion in 2016.

Elizondo was born in Aguascalientes, Mexico, and was raised in El Paso, Texas, and is a graduate of the University of Maryland and American University Washington College of Law, holding a Juris Doctor degree from the latter.
