= 2026 St. Louis Battlehawks season =

American professional football season

- Owner: Alpha Acquico, LLC
- Head coach: Ricky Proehl
- Home stadium: The Dome at America's Center

Results
- Record: 6–4
- Conference place: 2nd in UFL
- Playoffs: Lost Semifinals (vs. Kings) 20–29

Uniform
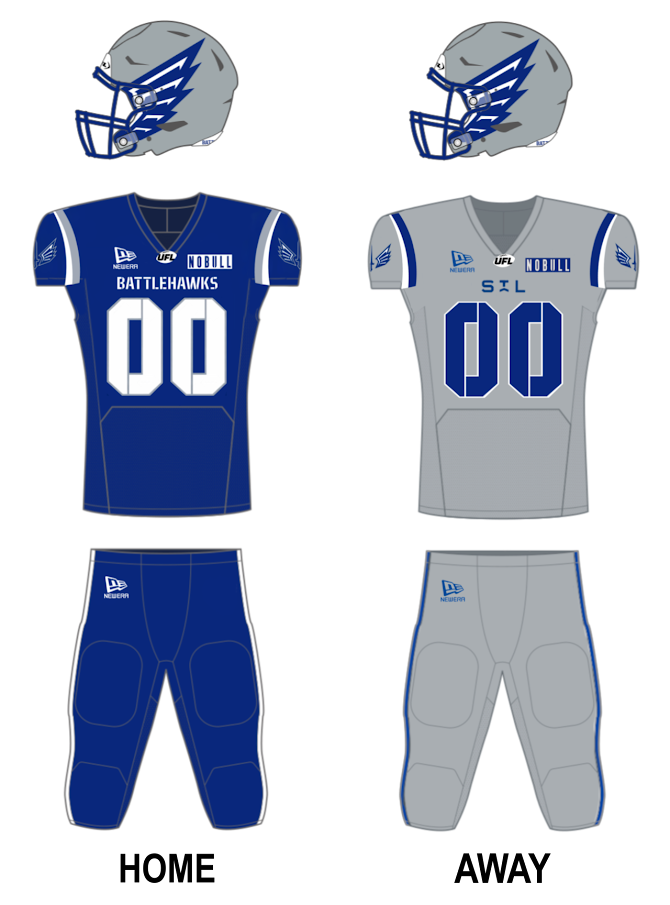

The 2026 St. Louis Battlehawks season was the fifth season for the St. Louis Battlehawks, their third in the UFL, and their first under head coach Ricky Proehl. The Battlehawks failed to improve on their 8–2 record from last season in the aftermath of their Week 4 road loss to the defending UFL champions, the DC Defenders, and failed to match it after an upset loss to the Houston Gamblers in their Week 8 matchup. After beating the Gamblers in a rematch the following week, the Battlehawks clinched their third consecutive playoff berth.

The Battlehawks hosted the Louisville Kings in the UFL Semifinals. They would lose to the Kings, 20–29. This was their third straight loss in the postseason.

== Offseason ==
=== Coaching Changes ===
On December 29, 2025, Ricky Proehl was named head coach of the Battlehawks, replacing Anthony Becht who would become the new head coach for the Orlando Storm. On February 23, 2026, the Battlehawks announced their full 2026 coaching staff.

=== Draft ===
Teams were allowed to protect up to 12 players from their 2025 rosters.

=== Staff ===
St. Louis Battlehawks staff
Head coach: Head coach – Ricky Proehl; Offensive coaches: Offensive coordinator – A. J. Smith; Running backs – John Estes; Wide receivers – Austin Proehl; Offensive line – Todd Washington	Defensive coaches: Defensive coordinator – Corey Chamblin; Defensive line – Jeff Zgonina; Linebackers – Will Reed; Special teams – Frank Gansz Jr.

== Roster ==
2026 St. Louis Battlehawks final roster
Quarterbacks: 11 Harrison Frost; 12 Luis Perez; 18 Brandon Silvers; Running backs: 41 Jarveon Howard; 26 Kylin James; 25 Kevon Latulas; Wide receivers: 88 Hakeem Butler; 3 Frank Darby; 8 Blake Jackson; 5 Gary Jennings Jr.; 87 Steven McBride; 1 Jahcour Pearson; 10 Justin Smith; 83 Thayer Thomas; Tight ends: 85 James Bostic; 80 Sal Cannella	Offensive linemen: 70 Bradley Ashmore T; 62 Abdul Beecham G; 75 Javion Cohen G; 76 Richard Gouraige T; 63 Sincere Haynesworth G/C; 71 Que McBroom T; 61 Mike Panasiuk C; 72 Spencer Rolland G/T; Defensive linemen: 96 Carlos Davis DT; 92 Neil Farrell DT; 56 Travis Feeney DE; 91 Demone Harris DE; 44 Steve Linton DE; 55 Leonard Payne Jr. DT; 95 Taylor Stallworth DT; 7 Pita Taumoepenu DE	Linebackers: 52 Michael Barrett; 51 LaVonta Bentley; 33 Tuasivi Nomura; 32 A. J. Thomas; 15 Jordan Williams; Defensive backs: 36 Adonis Alexander CB; 14 Nevelle Clarke CB; 9 Trey Dean SS; 29 Sean Fresch CB; 21 Tayler Hawkins FS; 19 Daniel Isom CB; 22 Keylon Kennedy CB; 23 Jordan Mosley SS; 2 Michael Ojemudia CB; 6 Myles Sims CB; Special teams: 20 Ramiz Ahmed K; 53 Matt Hembrough LS; 27 Ryan Sanborn P	Reserve lists: 0 Luq Barcoo CB (IR); 24 Abraham Beauplan LB (IR); -- Lideatrick Griffin WR Retired; 47 Rahjai Harris RB (IR); 23 Kameron Kelly FS (IR); 17 Tucker McCann K (IR); 81 Tyler Neville TE (IR); 50 active, 7 inactive

== Schedule ==
All times Central

Week	Day	Date	Kickoff	TV	Opponent	Results		Location	Attendance
Week	Day	Date	Kickoff	TV	Opponent	Score	Record	Location	Attendance
1	Saturday	March 28	11:00 a.m.	ESPN	DC Defenders	W 16–10	1–0	The Dome at America's Center	31,191
2	Tuesday	April 7	7:00 p.m.	FS1	at Dallas Renegades	L 15–31	1–1	Toyota Stadium	5,799
3	Sunday	April 12	2:00 p.m.	ABC	Birmingham Stallions	W 34–30	2–1	The Dome at America's Center	20,209
4	Saturday	April 18	11:30 a.m.	ABC	at DC Defenders	L 22–28	2–2	Audi Field	7,940
5	Saturday	April 25	6:00 p.m.	ESPN	at Orlando Storm	W 25–17	3–2	Inter&Co Stadium	9,735
6	Thursday	April 30	7:00 p.m.	FS1	at Louisville Kings	W 16–3	4–2	Lynn Family Stadium	10,456
7	Friday	May 8	7:00 p.m.	Fox	Columbus Aviators	W 31–20	5–2	The Dome at America's Center	18,563
8	Saturday	May 16	2:00 p.m.	ABC	Houston Gamblers	L 16–23	5–3	The Dome at America's Center	21,609
9	Sunday	May 24	6:00 p.m.	ESPN2	at Houston Gamblers	W 21–15	6–3	Shell Energy Stadium	6,217
10	Friday	May 29	7:00 p.m.	Fox	Dallas Renegades	L 16–20	6–4	The Dome at America's Center	24,621

=== Game summaries ===
==== Week 1: vs. DC Defenders ====
Week 1: DC Defenders at St. Louis Battlehawks – Game summary

Quarter	1	2	3	4	Total
Defenders	10	0	0	0	10
Battlehawks	3	3	7	3	16

at The Dome at America's Center • St. Louis, Missouri

- Date: March 28
- Game time: 11:00 a.m. CDT
- Game weather: Sunny, 39 °F (4 °C)
- Game attendance: 31,191
- Referee: Adam Savoie
- TV announcers (ESPN): Mark Jones, Roddy Jones, Cole Cubelic and Harry Douglas
- Game Book

Game information

First quarter

- DC – Matt McCrane 60-yard four-point field goal, 9:08. Defenders 4–0. Drive: 8 plays • 35 yards • 4:08
- STL – Tucker McCann 58-yard field goal, 5:38. Defenders 4–3. Drive: 7 plays • 17 yards • 3:30
- DC – Deon Jackson 1-yard run (two-point pass failed), 1:17. Defenders 10–3. Drive: 10 plays • 71 yards • 4:21

Second quarter

- STL – Tucker McCann 27-yard field goal, 0:00. Defenders 10–6. Drive: 8 plays • 77 yards • 3:41

Third quarter

- STL – Tyler Neville 10-yard pass from Brandon Silvers (Tucker McCann kick), 8:02. Battlehawks 13–10. Drive: 3 plays • 51 yards • 1:57

Fourth quarter

- STL – Tucker McCann 25-yard field goal, 11:59. Battlehawks 16–10. Drive: 12 plays • 41 yards • 6:35

Top passers

- DC – Jordan Ta'amu – 9/16, 123 yards, 2 INT
- STL – Brandon Silvers – 16/28, 198 yards, TD

Top rushers

- DC – Deon Jackson – 17 rushes, 57 yards, TD
- STL – Jarveon Howard – 11 rushes, 45 yards

Top receivers

- DC – Seth Williams – 3 receptions, 51 yards
- STL – Jarveon Howard – 4 receptions, 24 yards

==== Week 2: at Dallas Renegades ====
Week 2: St. Louis Battlehawks at Dallas Renegades – Game summary

Quarter	1	2	3	4	Total
Battlehawks	3	0	3	9	15
Renegades	9	8	0	14	31

at Toyota Stadium • Frisco, Texas

- Date: April 7
- Game time: 7:00 p.m. CDT
- Game weather: Partly cloudy, 72 °F (22 °C)
- Game attendance: 5,799
- Referee: Francisco Villar
- TV announcers (FS1): Kevin Kugler, Devin Gardner and Jenny Taft
- Game Book

Game information

First quarter

- DAL – Tyler Vaughns 7-yard pass from Austin Reed (kick failed), 11:56. Renegades 6–0. Drive: 6 plays • 68 yards • 3:04
- DAL – Colton Theaker 48-yard field goal, 8:28. Renegades 9–0. Drive: 4 plays • 4 yards • 2:11
- STL – Tucker McCann 20-yard field goal, 3:00. Renegades 9–3. Drive: 10 plays • 72 yards • 5:28

Second quarter

- DAL – Greg Ward 12-yard pass from Austin Reed (Austin Reed–Seth Green two-point pass), 6:44. Renegades 17–3. Drive: 5 plays • 71 yards • 2:21

Third quarter

- STL – Tucker McCann 45-yard field goal, 8:18. Renegades 17–6. Drive: 4 plays • 4 yards • 1:58

Fourth quarter

- DAL – Tyler Vaughns 8-yard pass from Austin Reed (Colton Theaker kick), 14:32. Renegades 24–6. Drive: 15 plays • 60 yards • 8:46
- STL – Tyler Neville 10-yard pass from Brandon Silvers (Brandon Silvers–Hakeem Butler three-point pass), 6:44. Renegades 24–15. Drive: 12 plays • 50 yards • 6:34
- DAL – Tyler Vaughns 30-yard pass from Austin Reed (Colton Theaker kick), 7:58. Renegades 31–15. Drive: 4 plays • 38 yards • 1:51

Top passers

- STL – Brandon Silvers – 22/39, 186 yards, TD, 2 INT
- DAL – Austin Reed – 22/36, 240 yards, 4 TD, INT

Top rushers

- STL – Kevon Latulas – 4 rushes, 16 yards
- DAL – Dae Dae Hunter – 10 rushes, 67 yards

Top receivers

- STL – Jarveon Howard – 5 receptions, 28 yards
- DAL – Tyler Vaughns – 11 receptions, 146 yards, 3 TD

==== Week 3: vs. Birmingham Stallions ====
Week 3: Birmingham Stallions at St. Louis Battlehawks – Game summary

Quarter	1	2	3	4	Total
Stallions	0	7	16	7	30
Battlehawks	10	3	0	21	34

at The Dome at America's Center • St. Louis, Missouri

- Date: April 12
- Game time: 2:00 p.m. CDT
- Game weather: Sunny, 78 °F (26 °C)
- Game attendance: 20,209
- Referee: Jason Autrey
- TV announcers (ABC): Joe Tessitore, Jordan Rodgers, Brock Osweiler and Sam Acho
- Game Book

Game information

First quarter

- STL – Jordan Williams 10-yard interception return (Tucker McCann kick), 12:19. Battlehawks 7–0.
- STL – Tucker McCann 54-yard field goal, 1:03. Battlehawks 10–0. Drive: 9 plays • 16 yards • 5:23

Second quarter

- BIR – Jordan Thomas 35-yard pass from Matt Corral (Jonathan Garibay kick), 8:19. Battlehawks 10–7. Drive: 1 play • 35 yards • 0:09
- STL – Tucker McCann 40-yard field goal, 1:51. Battlehawks 13–7. Drive: 4 plays • -10 yards • 0:54

Third quarter

- BIR – Jonathan Garibay 34-yard field goal, 11:32. Battlehawks 13–10. Drive: 7 plays • 51 yards • 3:28
- BIR – Mario Goodrich 40-yard interception return (kick failed), 11:21. Stallions 16–13.
- BIR – Anthony McFarland Jr. 1-yard run (Jonathan Garibay kick), 6:21. Stallions 23–13. Drive: 6 plays • 34 yards • 3:37

Fourth quarter

- STL – Steven McBride 2-yard pass from Harrison Frost (Tucker McCann kick), 13:52. Stallions 23–20. Drive: 5 plays • 40 yards • 1:36
- BIR – Deon Cain 67-yard pass from Matt Corral (Jonathan Garibay kick), 12:23. Stallions 30–20. Drive: 3 plays • 80 yards • 1:29
- STL – Hakeem Butler 64-yard pass from Harrison Frost (Tucker McCann kick), 11:20. Stallions 30–27. Drive: 2 plays • 64 yards • 1:03
- STL – Tyler Neville 11-yard pass from Harrison Frost (Tucker McCann kick), 1:52. Battlehawks 34–30. Drive: 12 plays • 75 yards • 6:01

Top passers

- BIR – Matt Corral – 16/33, 252 yards, 2 TD, 2 INT
- STL – Harrison Frost – 9/15, 148 yards, 2 INT

Top rushers

- BIR – Anthony McFarland Jr. – 13 rushes, 56 yards, TD
- STL – Kevon Latulas – 8 rushes, 30 yards

Top receivers

- BIR – Justyn Ross – 4 receptions, 36 yards
- STL – Hakeem Butler – 4 receptions, 146 yards, TD

==== Week 4: at DC Defenders ====
Week 4: St. Louis Battlehawks at DC Defenders – Game summary

Quarter	1	2	3	4	Total
Battlehawks	3	9	0	10	22
Defenders	7	10	5	6	28

at Audi Field • Washington, D.C.

- Date: April 18
- Game time: 11:30 a.m. CDT
- Game weather: Partly cloudy, 78 °F (26 °C)
- Game attendance: 7,940
- Referee: Michael Vandervelde
- TV announcers (ABC): Roy Philpott, Jordan Rodgers, Sam Acho and Tom Luginbill
- Game Book

Game information

First quarter

- STL – Tucker McCann 51-yard field goal, 9:08. Battlehawks 3–0. Drive: 12 plays • 39 yards • 5:55
- DC – Keke Coutee 14-yard pass from Jordan Ta'amu (Matt McCrane kick), 3:30. Defenders 7–3. Drive: 11 plays • 72 yards • 5:41

Second quarter

- STL – Hakeem Butler 75-yard pass from Harrison Frost (kick failed), 13:28. Battlehawks 9–7. Drive: 1 plays • 75 yards • 0:12
- DC – Matt McCrane 56-yard field goal, 13:16. Defenders 10–9. Drive: 5 plays • 22 yards • 2:15
- DC – Ty Scott 3-yard pass from Jordan Ta'amu (Matt McCrane kick), 3:11. Defenders 17–9. Drive: 10 plays • 65 yards • 5:53
- STL – Tucker McCann 26-yard field goal, 0:00. Defenders 17–12. Drive: 3 plays • 67 yards • 0:18

Third quarter

- DC – Matt McCrane 43-yard field goal, 8:49. Defenders 20–12. Drive: 11 plays • 48 yards • 6:14
- DC – Harrison Frost sacked in the end zone for a safety, 8:23. Defenders 22–12. Drive: 1 plays • -21 yards • 0:26

Fourth quarter

- DC – Matt McCrane 24-yard field goal, 12:54. Defenders 25–12. Drive: 8 plays • 49 yards • 4:46
- STL – Kevon Latulas 7-yard run (Tucker McCann kick), 10:00. Defenders 25–19. Drive: 5 plays • 65 yards • 2:51
- DC – Matt McCrane 39-yard field goal, 5:52. Defenders 28–19. Drive: 8 plays • 44 yards • 4:10
- STL – Tucker McCann 28-yard field goal, 2:00. Defenders 28–22. Drive: 7 plays • 63 yards • 3:52

Top passers

- STL – Harrison Frost – 6/21, 144 yards, TD, INT
- DC – Jordan Ta'amu – 22/36, 204 yards, 2 TD

Top rushers

- STL – Jarveon Howard – 8 rushes, 85 yards
- DC – Jordan Ta'amu – 11 rushes, 61 yards

Top receivers

- STL – Hakeem Butler – 2 receptions, 109 yards, TD
- DC – Cornell Powell – 7 receptions, 85 yards

==== Week 5: at Orlando Storm ====
Week 5: St. Louis Battlehawks at Orlando Storm – Game summary

Quarter	1	2	3	4	Total
Battlehawks	6	12	7	0	25
Storm	0	0	14	3	17

at Inter&Co Stadium • Orlando, Florida

- Date: April 25
- Game time: 6:00 p.m. CDT
- Game weather: Partly cloudy, 74 °F (23 °C)
- Game attendance: 9,735
- Referee: Bryan Banks
- TV announcers (ESPN): Lowell Galindo, Kirk Morrison, Eric Mac Lain and Max Browne
- Game Book

Game information

First quarter

- STL – Kylin James 2-yard run (kick failed), 11:03. Battlehawks 6–0. Drive: 8 plays • 67 yards • 3:57

Second quarter

- STL – James Bostic III 10-yard pass from Harrison Frost (kick failed), 12:02. Battlehawks 12–0. Drive: 11 plays • 59 yards • 4:58
- STL – Ryan Sanborn 36-yard field goal, 3:46. Battlehawks 15–0. Drive: 9 plays • 63 yards • 4:51
- STL – Ryan Sanborn 40-yard field goal, 0:04. Battlehawks 18–0. Drive: 6 plays • 29 yards • 0:48

Third quarter

- STL – Harrison Frost 2-yard run (Ryan Sanborn kick), 11:52. Battlehawks 25–0. Drive: 4 plays • 41 yards • 1:30
- ORL – Elijhah Badger 4-yard pass from Jack Plummer (Michael Lantz kick), 7:17. Battlehawks 25–7. Drive: 11 plays • 59 yards • 4:58
- ORL – Elijah Dotson 1-yard run (Michael Lantz kick), 5:23. Battlehawks 25–14. Drive: 1 plays • 1 yards • 0:03

Fourth quarter

- ORL – Michael Lantz 32-yard field goal, 1:52. Battlehawks 25–17. Drive: 16 plays • 69 yards • 7:02

Top passers

- STL – Harrison Frost – 20/31, 185 yards, TD, 2 INT
- ORL – Jack Plummer – 24/44, 143 yards, TD

Top rushers

- STL – Jarveon Howard – 17 rushes, 57 yards, TD
- ORL – Jashaun Corbin – 11 rushes, 45 yards

Top receivers

- STL – Steven McBride – 4 receptions, 53 yards
- ORL – Cam Camper – 6 receptions, 34 yards

==== Week 6: at Louisville Kings ====
Week 6: St. Louis Battlehawks at Louisville Kings – Game summary

Quarter	1	2	3	4	Total
Battlehawks	0	9	7	0	16
Kings	3	0	0	0	3

at Lynn Family Stadium • Louisville, Kentucky

- Date: April 30
- Game time: 7:00 p.m. CDT
- Game weather: Sunny, 60 °F (16 °C)
- Game attendance: 10,456
- Referee: Kole Knueppel
- TV announcers (FS1): Kevin Kugler, Devin Gardner and Jake Butt
- Game Book

Game information

First quarter

- LOU – Tanner Brown 40-yard field goal, 9:48. Kings 3–0. Drive: 10 plays • 43 yards • 5:12

Second quarter

- STL – Ramiz Ahmed 42-yard field goal, 11:36. Tied 3–3. Drive: 6 plays • 53 yards • 2:30
- STL – Gary Jennings Jr. 4-yard pass from Harrison Frost (kick failed), 2:39. Battlehawks 9–3. Drive: 6 plays • 53 yards • 2:30

Third quarter

- STL – Steven McBride 11-yard pass from Harrison Frost (Ramiz Ahmed kick), 5:08. Battlehawks 16–3. Drive: 11 plays • 64 yards • 5:01

Fourth quarter

- No scoring plays

Top passers

- STL – Harrison Frost – 22/40, 242 yards, 2 TD, INT
- LOU – Chandler Rogers – 15/32, 199 yards, INT

Top rushers

- STL – Jarveon Howard – 16 rushes, 56 yards
- LOU – James Robinson – 7 rushes, 13 yards

Top receivers

- STL – Hakeem Butler – 3 receptions, 47 yards
- LOU – Tarik Black – 4 receptions, 72 yards

==== Week 7: vs. Columbus Aviators ====
Week 7: Columbus Aviators at St. Louis Battlehawks – Game summary

Quarter	1	2	3	4	Total
Aviators	0	7	7	6	20
Battlehawks	14	10	7	0	31

at The Dome at America's Center • St. Louis, Missouri

- Date: May 8
- Game time: 7:00 p.m. CDT
- Game weather: Moderate or heavy rain showers, 72 °F (22 °C)
- Game attendance: 18,563
- Referee: Bryan Banks
- TV announcers (Fox): Curt Menefee, Joel Klatt and Brock Huard
- Game Book

Game information

First quarter

- STL – Luis Perez 1-yard run (Ramiz Ahmed kick), 6:21. Battlehawks 7–0. Drive: 8 plays • 73 yards • 4:28
- STL – Steven McBride 14-yard pass from Luis Perez (Ramiz Ahmed kick), 0:14. Battlehawks 14–0. Drive: 8 plays • 70 yards • 3:56

Second quarter

- CLB – Jalen Morton 15-yard run (Ryan Coe kick), 12:32. Battlehawks 14–7. Drive: 5 plays • 42 yards • 2:42
- STL – Ramiz Ahmed 38-yard field goal, 7:11. Battlehawks 17–7. Drive: 9 plays • 38 yards • 5:21
- STL – Kylin James 14-yard run (Ramiz Ahmed kick), 3:56. Battlehawks 24–7. Drive: 2 plays • 40 yards • 0:53

Third quarter

- CLB – Tay Martin 12-yard pass from Jalan McClendon (Ryan Coe kick), 11:08. Battlehawks 24–14. Drive: 5 plays • 44 yards • 3:10
- STL – Kylin James 18-yard run (Ramiz Ahmed kick), 7:05. Battlehawks 31–14. Drive: 6 plays • 52 yards • 4:03

Fourth quarter

- CLB – Keke Chism 10-yard pass from Jalan McClendon (kick failed), 7:16. Battlehawks 31–20. Drive: 13 plays • 84 yards • 6:25

Top passers

- CLB – Jalan McClendon – 20/28, 153 yards, 2 TD, INT
- STL – Luis Perez – 16/30, 204 yards, TD, INT

Top rushers

- CLB – John Lovett – 10 rushes, 52 yards
- STL – Jarveon Howard – 12 rushes, 59 yards

Top receivers

- CLB – Tay Martin – 7 receptions, 55 yards, TD
- STL – Jahcour Pearson – 4 receptions, 39 yards

The 24 points scored in first half were the most points scored by the Battlehawks in any half this season. With this dominant win, the Battlehawks improved to 5–2.

==== Week 8: vs. Houston Gamblers ====
Week 8: Houston Gamblers at St. Louis Battlehawks – Game summary

Quarter	1	2	3	4	Total
Gamblers	14	6	3	0	23
Battlehawks	3	6	0	7	16

at The Dome at America's Center • St. Louis, Missouri

- Date: May 16
- Game time: 2:00 p.m. CDT
- Game weather: Light rain, 78 °F (26 °C)
- Game attendance: 21,609
- Referee: Kole Knueppel
- TV announcers (ABC): Joe Tessitore, Jordan Rodgers, Brock Osweiler and Tom Luginbill
- Game Book

Game information

First quarter

- STL – Ramiz Ahmed 32-yard field goal, 10:48. Battlehawks 3–0. Drive: 4 plays • 10 yards • 1:53
- HOU – Jontre Kirklin 4-yard pass from Hunter Dekkers (John Hoyland kick), 6:25. Gamblers 7–3. Drive: 8 plays • 66 yards • 4:09
- HOU – Kary Vincent Jr. 35-yard interception return (John Hoyland kick), 4:40. Gamblers 14–3.

Second quarter

- STL – Ramiz Ahmed 44-yard field goal, 13:06. Gamblers 14–6. Drive: 13 plays • 48 yards • 6:34
- HOU – Lawrence Keys III 35-yard pass from Hunter Dekkers (kick failed), 3:26. Gamblers 20–6. Drive: 8 plays • 81 yards • 4:05
- STL – Ramiz Ahmed 25-yard field goal, 0:18. Gamblers 20–9. Drive: 4 plays • 9 yards • 0:25

Third quarter

- HOU – John Hoyland 37-yard field goal, 5:02. Gamblers 23–9. Drive: 11 plays • 46 yards • 5:50

Fourth quarter

- STL – Tyler Neville 7-yard pass from Luis Perez (Ramiz Ahmed kick), 10:36. Gamblers 23–16. Drive: 7 plays • 56 yards • 3:46

Top passers

- HOU – Hunter Dekkers – 15/22, 155 yards, 2 TD, INT
- STL – Luis Perez – 26/47, 308 yards, TD, 2 INT

Top rushers

- HOU – Kirk Merritt – 2 rushes, 22 yards
- STL – Jarveon Howard – 9 rushes, 31 yards

Top receivers

- HOU – Jalen Moreno-Cropper – 5 receptions, 52 yards
- STL – Steven McBride – 8 receptions, 116 yards

==== Week 9: at Houston Gamblers ====
Week 9: St. Louis Battlehawks at Houston Gamblers – Game summary

Quarter	1	2	3	4	Total
Battlehawks	0	10	8	3	21
Gamblers	6	3	6	0	15

at Shell Energy Stadium • Houston, Texas

- Date: May 24
- Game time: 6:00 p.m. CDT
- Game weather: Sunny, 85 °F (29 °C)
- Game attendance: 6,217
- Referee: Jason Autrey
- TV announcers (ESPN2): Lowell Galindo, Roddy Jones, Cole Cubelic and Harry Douglas
- Game Book

Game information

First quarter

- HOU – JaVonta Payton 7-yard pass from Hunter Dekkers (kick failed), 6:58. Gamblers 6–0. Drive: 3 plays • 43 yards • 1:28

Second quarter

- HOU – John Hoyland 28-yard field goal, 12:07. Gamblers 9–0. Drive: 8 plays • 58 yards • 4:02
- STL – Ramiz Ahmed 36-yard field goal, 4:17. Gamblers 9–3. Drive: 5 plays • 26 yards • 2:47
- STL – Hakeem Butler 38-yard pass from Luis Perez (Ramiz Ahmed kick), 0:01. Battlehawks 10–9. Drive: 4 plays • 68 yards • 0:25

Third quarter

- HOU – Kirk Merritt 4-yard run (two-point run failed), 10:26. Gamblers 15–10. Drive: 5 plays • 69 yards • 2:16
- STL – Kylin James 2-yard run (Jarveon Howard two-point run), 3:48. Battlehawks 18–15. Drive: 12 plays • 74 yards • 6:38

Fourth quarter

- STL – Ramiz Ahmed 34-yard field goal, 2:56. Battlehawks 21–15. Drive: 10 plays • 27 yards • 5:46

Top passers

- STL – Luis Perez – 26/39, 239 yards, TD, INT
- HOU – John Rhys Plumlee – 11/21, 131 yards, INT

Top rushers

- STL – Jarveon Howard – 14 rushes, 55 yards
- HOU – Marcus Yarns – 13 rushes, 98 yards

Top receivers

- STL – Steven McBride – 6 receptions, 76 yards
- HOU – Jalen Moreno-Cropper – 4 receptions, 103 yards

==== Week 10: vs. Dallas Renegades ====
Week 10: Dallas Renegades at St. Louis Battlehawks – Game summary

Quarter	1	2	3	4	Total
Renegades	7	6	0	7	20
Battlehawks	3	3	7	3	16

at The Dome at America's Center • St. Louis, Missouri

- Date: May 29
- Game time: 7:00 p.m. CDT
- Game weather: Sunny, 78 °F (26 °C)
- Game attendance: 24,621
- Referee: Michael Vandervelde
- TV announcers (Fox): Kevin Kugler, Joel Klatt and Jenny Taft
- Game Book

Game information

First quarter

- STL – Ramiz Ahmed 45-yard field goal, 7:46. Battlehawks 3–0. Drive: 9 plays • 34 yards • 5:12
- DAL – Emmanuel Butler 7-yard pass from Austin Reed (Colton Theaker kick), 1:19. Renegades 7–3. Drive: 6 plays • 46 yards • 3:16

Second quarter

- STL – Ramiz Ahmed 32-yard field goal, 12:49. Renegades 7–6. Drive: 7 plays • 60 yards • 3:30
- DAL – Tyler Vaughns 4-yard pass from Austin Reed (kick failed), 1:56. Renegades 13–6. Drive: 7 plays • 55 yards • 3:39

Third quarter

- STL – James Bostic III 10-yard pass from Luis Perez (Ramiz Ahmed kick), 4:25. Tied 13–13. Drive: 9 plays • 69 yards • 5:23

Fourth quarter

- STL – Ramiz Ahmed 32-yard field goal, 10:00. Battlehawks 16–13. Drive: 8 plays • 15 yards • 3:32
- DAL – Emmanuel Butler 7-yard pass from Austin Reed (Colton Theaker kick), 3:32. Renegades 20–16. Drive: 11 plays • 61 yards • 3:28

Top passers

- DAL – Austin Reed – 15/26, 162 yards, 3 TD
- STL – Luis Perez – 18/29, 272 yards, TD, 2 INT

Top rushers

- DAL – Lorenzo Lingard – 15 rushes, 30 yards
- STL – Kylin James – 6 rushes, 40 yards

Top receivers

- DAL – Emmanuel Butler – 3 receptions, 38 yards, 2 TD
- STL – Steven McBride – 4 receptions, 79 yards

== Standings ==
2026 UFL standings
Team	W	L	PCT	GB	TD+/-	TD+	TD-	PF	PA	DIFF	STK
(y) Orlando Storm	8	2	.800	–	9	26	17	232	186	46	W4
(x) St. Louis Battlehawks	6	4	.600	2	-2	21	23	212	197	15	L1
(x) Louisville Kings	6	4	.600	2	1	27	26	265	219	46	W4
(x) DC Defenders	5	5	.500	3	6	31	25	281	224	57	L4
(e) Dallas Renegades	4	6	.400	4	2	30	28	224	259	-35	W1
(e) Birmingham Stallions	4	6	.400	4	-1	24	25	190	229	-39	L2
(e) Houston Gamblers	4	6	.400	4	-6	20	26	189	236	-60	W1
(e) Columbus Aviators	3	7	.300	5	-6	27	33	216	259	-43	L1
(x)–clinched playoff berth; (y)–clinched conference; (e)–eliminated from playoff contention

== Postseason ==
All times Central

Week	Day	Date	Kickoff	TV	Opponent	Results		Location	Attendance
Week	Day	Date	Kickoff	TV	Opponent	Score	Record	Location	Attendance
Semifinals	Sunday	June 7	5:00 p.m.	Fox	Louisville Kings	L 20–29	0–1	The Dome at America's Center	18,111

=== UFL Semifinals: vs. Louisville Kings ===
UFL Semifinals: Louisville Kings at St. Louis Battlehawks – Game summary

Quarter	1	2	3	4	Total
Kings	11	0	7	11	29
Battlehawks	3	14	3	0	20

at The Dome at America's Center • St. Louis, Missouri

- Date: June 7
- Game time: 5:00 p.m. CDT
- Game weather: Patchy rain nearby, 86 °F (30 °C)
- Game attendance: 18,111
- Referee: Adam Savoie
- TV announcers (Fox): Curt Menefee, Joel Klatt and Brock Huard
- Game Book

Game information

First quarter

- LOU – James Robinson 53-yard run (Tanner Brown kick), 11:02. Kings 7–0. Drive: 4 plays • 74 yards • 2:01
- STL – Ramiz Ahmed 37-yard field goal, 4:21. Kings 7–3. Drive: 12 plays • 49 yards • 6:41
- LOU – Tanner Brown 60-yard four-point field goal, 1:52. Kings 11–3. Drive: 5 plays • 23 yards • 2:29

Second quarter

- STL – Jarveon Howard 1-yard run (Ramiz Ahmed kick), 11:48. Kings 11–10. Drive: 10 plays • 61 yards • 5:04
- STL – Blake Jackson 12-yard pass from Luis Perez (Ramiz Ahmed kick), 1:48. Battlehawks 17–11. Drive: 6 plays • 43 yards • 2:17

Third quarter

- LOU – Isaiah Winstead 12-yard pass from Chandler Rogers (Tanner Brown kick), 5:23. Kings 18–17. Drive: 6 plays • 89 yards • 3:22
- STL – Ramiz Ahmed 45-yard field goal, 1:00. Battlehawks 20–18. Drive: 7 plays • 50 yards • 4:23

Fourth quarter

- LOU – Ian Wheeler 51-yard run (Tanner Brown kick), 11:46. Kings 25–20. Drive: 2 plays • 62 yards • 0:42
- LOU – Tanner Brown 63-yard four-point field goal, 4:41. Kings 29–20. Drive: 4 plays • 9 yards • 2:09

Top passers

- LOU – Chandler Rogers – 12/20, 162 yards, TD
- STL – Luis Perez – 27/45, 249 yards, TD, INT

Top rushers

- LOU – Ian Wheeler – 7 rushes, 89 yards, TD
- STL – Jarveon Howard – 15 rushes, 70 yards, TD

Top receivers

- LOU – Lucky Jackson – 4 receptions, 38 yards
- STL – Steven McBride – 6 receptions, 84 yards
