= 2026 Houston Gamblers season =

American professional football season

- Owner: Alpha Acquico, LLC
- Head coach: Kevin Sumlin
- Home stadium: Shell Energy Stadium

Results
- Record: 4–6
- Conference place: 7th in UFL
- Playoffs: Did not qualify

Uniform
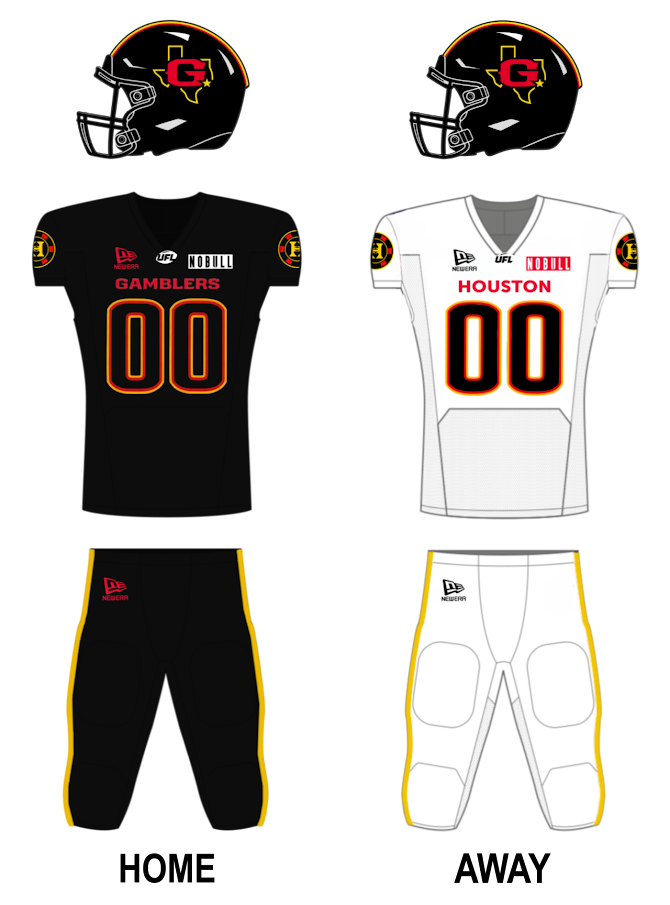

The 2026 Houston Gamblers season was the third season for the Houston Gamblers, marking their first season under the Gamblers name in the UFL after spending the past two seasons as the Houston Roughnecks.

In the aftermath of their Week 7 home loss to the expansion team Orlando Storm, the Gamblers failed to improve from their 5–5 record from last season, and failed to match this record 2 weeks later.

Much like last year, the Gamblers started out slow as their record throughout the first four games of the season was 1–3, but they managed to complete a 3–3 turnaround to finish one game shy of last year's win total. This was because they had to go through a quarterback carousel throughout the first three weeks of the season, where they started three quarterbacks in three straight games. Houston went 2–3 both at home and on the road, which ultimately cost them a trip to the playoffs.

The biggest lowlight of the season came in Week 3 against the defending UFL champions DC Defenders, where they lost by the score of 45–7, which is the biggest loss in UFL history. Following their Week 9 home loss to the St. Louis Battlehawks, the Gamblers were eliminated from playoff contention for the fifth consecutive season and secured their first losing record since going 1–9 as the Roughnecks in 2024. However, one of the few bright spots of the season included a season sweep over their longtime rival the Birmingham Stallions, with their second win in the series eliminating the latter from playoff contention.

== Offseason ==
=== Coaching Changes ===
On December 31, 2025, Kevin Sumlin would be hired as the head coach of the Gamblers, replacing Curtis Johnson. On February 24, 2026, the Gamblers announced their full 2026 coaching staff.

=== Draft ===
Teams were allowed to protect up to 12 players from their 2025 rosters.

== Staff ==
Houston Gamblers staff
Head coach: Head coach – Kevin Sumlin; Offensive coaches: Offensive coordinator – Eric Price; Running backs – KC Gundy; Wide receivers – Tyron Carrier; Offensive line – Tim Holt	Defensive coaches: Defensive coordinator – Marvin Sanders; Linebackers – Grant Dickerson; Safeties – Ted Bolin

== Final roster ==
2026 Houston Gamblers final roster
Quarterbacks: 8 Hunter Dekkers; 15 Nolan Henderson; 9 John Rhys Plumlee; Running backs: 34 Marcus Major; 22 Kirk Merritt; 32 Jalen White; 21 Marcus Yarns; Wide receivers: 87 Kaden Davis; 11 Justin Hall; 3 Lawrence Keys III; 13 Jontre Kirklin; 10 Kai Locksley; 17 Jalen Moreno-Cropper; 7 JaVonta Payton; Tight ends: 80 Armani Rogers; 85 Geor'Quarius Spivey; 89 Cam Sutton	Offensive linemen: 79 Gottlieb Ayedze T; 71 Jackson Carman G/T; 64 Victor Curne G; 54 Avery Jones G/C; 65 Jack Kramer C; 73 Tedi Kushi T; 70 Jalen McKenzie T; 77 Gareth Warren G; Defensive linemen: 2 Christopher Allen DE; 95 Israel Antwine DT; 72 Kyon Barrs DT; 99 Jerrod Clark DT; 55 Kenny Dyson DE; 92 Malik Fisher DE; 59 Jah Joyner DE; 90 Rashard Lawrence DT	Linebackers: 19 Eugene Asante; 28 Marvin Moody Jr.; 5 Charlie Thomas; 47 DaShaun White; Defensive backs: 1 Damon Arnette CB; 24 Nico Bolden S; 18 Major Burns S; 33 Mello Dotson CB; 25 Glendon Miller S; 6 Quinton Newsome CB; 4 Roman Parodie CB; 20 Ameer Speed CB; 0 Kary Vincent Jr. CB; 26 Eli Walker S; Special teams: 46 John Hoyland K; 45 Marco Ortiz LS; 44 Mike Rivers P	Reserve lists 50 active, 0 inactive

== Schedule ==
All times Central

Week	Date	Time	TV	Opponent	Result	Record	Venue	Attendance
1	March 28	3:00 p.m.	Fox	at Dallas Renegades	L 17–36	0–1	Toyota Stadium	8,870
2	April 5	5:00 p.m.	NFL Network	Birmingham Stallions	W 22–20	1–1	Shell Energy Stadium	7,744
3	April 11	11:00 a.m.	ESPN	at DC Defenders	L 7–45	1–2	Audi Field	12,167
4	April 16	7:00 p.m.	NFL Network	Louisville Kings	L 22–24 (OT)	1–3	Shell Energy Stadium	4,880
5	April 26	11:00 a.m.	ABC	Columbus Aviators	W 17–13	2–3	Shell Energy Stadium	5,166
6	May 1	7:00 p.m.	Fox	at Columbus Aviators	L 17–24	2–4	Historic Crew Stadium	8,347
7	May 10	5:00 p.m.	FS1	Orlando Storm	L 23–24	2–5	Shell Energy Stadium	4,409
8	May 16	2:00 p.m.	ABC	at St. Louis Battlehawks	W 23–16	3–5	The Dome at America's Center	21,609
9	May 24	6:00 p.m.	ESPN2	St. Louis Battlehawks	L 15–21	3–6	Shell Energy Stadium	6,217
10	May 30	2:00 p.m.	ESPN2	at Birmingham Stallions	W 26–13	4–6	Protective Stadium	5,253

=== Game summaries ===
==== Week 1: at Dallas Renegades ====
Week 1: Houston Gamblers at Dallas Renegades – Game summary

Quarter	1	2	3	4	Total
Gamblers	3	0	8	6	17
Renegades	6	17	10	3	36

at Toyota Stadium • Frisco, Texas

- Date: March 28
- Game time: 3:00 p.m. CDT
- Game weather: Overcast, 58 °F (14 °C)
- Game attendance: 8,870
- Referee: Jason Autrey
- TV announcers (Fox): Curt Menefee, Joel Klatt and Jake Butt
- Game Book

Game information

First quarter

- DAL – Steven Jones Jr. 30-yard interception return (run failed), 9:46. Renegades 6–0.
- HOU – John Hoyland 44-yard field goal, 2:07. Renegades 6–3. Drive: 7 plays • 26 yards • 3:15

Second quarter

- DAL – Ellis Merriweather 3-yard pass from Austin Reed (Colton Theaker kick), 11:47. Renegades 13–3. Drive: 10 plays • 60 yards • 5:20
- DAL – Tyler Vaughns 14-yard pass from Austin Reed (Colton Theaker kick), 7:03. Renegades 20–3. Drive: 5 plays • 45 yards • 2:29
- DAL – Colton Theaker 51-yard field goal, 0:03. Renegades 23–3. Drive: 11 plays • 22 yards • 5:03

Third quarter

- DAL – Greg Ward 66-yard pass from Austin Reed (Colton Theaker kick), 14:44. Renegades 30–3. Drive: 1 plays • 66 yards • 0:15
- HOU – Jalen Moreno-Cropper 93-yard kick return (Jalen White two-point run), 14:31. Renegades 30–11.
- DAL – Colton Theaker 26-yard field goal, 8:30. Renegades 33–11. Drive: 11 plays • 72 yards • 6:01

Fourth quarter

- HOU – Hunter Dekkers 3-yard run (pass failed), 7:03. Renegades 33–17. Drive: 9 plays • 77 yards • 3:06
- DAL – Colton Theaker 41-yard field goal, 0:51. Renegades 36–17. Drive: 4 plays • 5 yards • 1:00

Top passers

- HOU – Hunter Dekkers – 19/29, 227 yards
- DAL – Austin Reed – 26/40, 376 yards, 3 TD

Top rushers

- HOU – Hunter Dekkers – 3 rushes, 28 yards, TD
- DAL – Lorenzo Lingard – 8 rushes, 36 yards

Top receivers

- HOU – Jalen Moreno-Cropper – 5 receptions, 59 yards
- DAL – Tyler Vaughns – 7 receptions, 144 yards, TD

The Gamblers had a rough start to their season, as they were down 30–3 early in the third quarter and ultimately lost to Austin Reed and the Dallas Renegades by the score of 36–17 in the process starting 0–1 for the fourth straight season, a streak that dates back to the 2023 season.

==== Week 2: vs. Birmingham Stallions ====
Week 2: Birmingham Stallions at Houston Gamblers – Game summary

Quarter	1	2	3	4	Total
Stallions	0	7	7	6	20
Gamblers	0	6	3	13	22

at Shell Energy Stadium • Houston, Texas

- Date: April 5
- Game time: 5:00 p.m. CDT
- Game weather: Overcast, 66 °F (19 °C)
- Game attendance: 7,745
- Referee: Kole Knueppel
- TV announcers (NFL Network): Mark Jones, Kirk Morrison, Cole Cubelic and Harry Douglas
- Game Book

Game information

First quarter

- No scoring plays

Second quarter

- HOU – John Hoyland 32-yard field goal, 5:54. Gamblers 3–0. Drive: 13 plays • 44 yards • 7:09
- HOU – John Hoyland 37-yard field goal, 1:11. Gamblers 6–0. Drive: 8 plays • 49 yards • 2:46
- BIR – Jaydon Mickens 6-yard pass from Matt Corral (Jonathan Garibay kick), 0:24. Stallions 7–6. Drive: 6 plays • 60 yards • 0:47

Third quarter

- BIR – Deon Cain 12-yard pass from Matt Corral (Jonathan Garibay kick), 11:11. Stallions 14–6. Drive: 7 plays • 63 yards • 3:49
- HOU – John Hoyland 26-yard field goal, 6:22. Stallions 14–9. Drive: 9 plays • 61 yards • 4:49

Fourth quarter

- HOU – John Hoyland 24-yard field goal, 14:56. Stallions 14–12. Drive: 9 plays • 68 yards • 4:35
- HOU – Jalen White 3-yard run (John Hoyland kick), 6:57. Gamblers 19–14. Drive: 14 plays • 57 yards • 7:10
- BIR – Anthony McFarland Jr. 1-yard run (pass failed), 2:02. Stallions 20–19. Drive: 9 plays • 59 yards • 4:55
- HOU – John Hoyland 50-yard field goal, 0:00. Gamblers 22–20. Drive: 9 plays • 43 yards • 2:02

Top passers

- BIR – Matt Corral – 21/27, 226 yards, 2 INT
- HOU – Nolan Henderson – 15/23, 186 yards

Top rushers

- BIR – Anthony McFarland Jr. – 7 rushes, 37 yards, TD
- HOU – Jalen White – 26 rushes, 82 yards, TD

Top receivers

- BIR – Justyn Ross – 5 receptions, 70 yards
- HOU – Jontre Kirklin – 5 receptions, 85 yards

The Gamblers rebounded at home, as kicker John Hoyland successfully made a 50-yard field goal as time expired to upset the Stallions, 22–20. This win improved the Gamblers to 1–1 and snapped a five-game losing streak against Birmingham, beating them for the first time since Week 5 of the 2023 season.

Despite the win, quarterback Nolan Henderson left with a dislocated finger, keeping him out for next week.

==== Week 3: at DC Defenders ====
Week 3: Houston Gamblers at DC Defenders – Game summary

Quarter	1	2	3	4	Total
Gamblers	0	0	7	0	7
Defenders	11	17	3	14	45

at Audi Field • Washington, D.C.

- Date: April 11
- Game time: 11:00 a.m. CDT
- Game weather: Partly cloudy, 66 °F (19 °C)
- Game attendance: 12,167
- Referee: Bryan Banks
- TV announcers (ESPN): Lowell Galindo, Kirk Morrison, Aaron Murray and Eric Mac Lain
- Game Book

Game information

First quarter

- DC – Deon Jackson 60-yard run (Matt McCrane kick), 12:30. Defenders 7–0. Drive: 2 plays • 69 yards • 0:41
- DC – Matt McCrane 60-yard four-point field goal, 7:59. Defenders 11–0. Drive: 6 plays • 15 yards • 2:53

Second quarter

- DC – Matt McCrane 46-yard field goal, 12:40. Defenders 14–0. Drive: 4 plays • 4 yards • 1:43
- DC – Gareon Conley 70-yard interception return (Matt McCrane kick), 9:57. Defenders 21–0.
- DC – Briley Moore 24-yard run (Matt McCrane kick), 0:35. Defenders 28–0. Drive: 9 plays • 76 yards • 4:43

Third quarter

- DC – Matt McCrane 38-yard field goal, 8:24. Defenders 31–0. Drive: 9 plays • 45 yards • 6:41
- HOU – Justin Hall 6-yard pass from Taulia Tagovailoa (John Hoyland kick), 4:02. Defenders 31–7. Drive: 8 plays • 53 yards • 4:23

Fourth quarter

- DC – Briley Moore 20-yard pass from Jordan Ta'amu (Matt McCrane kick), 12:38. Defenders 38–7. Drive: 5 plays • 55 yards • 1:54
- DC – Abram Smith 15-yard run (Matt McCrane kick), 4:42. Defenders 45–7. Drive: 8 plays • 60 yards • 4:34

Top passers

- HOU – Taulia Tagovailoa – 21/40, 171 yards, TD, INT
- DC – Jordan Ta'amu – 15/27, 173 yards, TD, INT

Top rushers

- HOU – Jalen White – 10 rushes, 28 yards
- DC – Deon Jackson – 5 rushes, 70 yards, TD

Top receivers

- HOU – Justin Hall – 9 receptions, 69 yards, TD
- DC – Ty Scott – 4 receptions, 49 yards

The 38-point margin of defeat marked the worst in UFL history. With the horrific loss, the Gamblers dropped to 1–2.

==== Week 4: vs. Louisville Kings ====
Week 4: Louisville Kings at Houston Gamblers – Game summary

Quarter	1	2	3	4	OT	Total
Kings	3	13	0	6	2	24
Gamblers	3	3	16	0	0	22

at Shell Energy Stadium • Houston, Texas

- Date: April 16
- Game time: 7:00 p.m. CDT
- Game weather: Partly cloudy, 79 °F (26 °C)
- Game attendance: 4,880
- Referee: Chris Coyte
- TV announcers (NFL Network): Lowell Galindo, Kirk Morrison, Aaron Murray and Eric Mac Lain
- Game Book

Game information

First quarter

- LOU – Tanner Brown 59-yard field goal, 11:19. Kings 3–0. Drive: 7 plays • 21 yards • 3:41
- HOU – John Hoyland 50-yard field goal, 6:35. Tied 3–3. Drive: 9 plays • 44 yards • 4:44.

Second quarter

- LOU – James Robinson 1-yard run (Tanner Brown kick), 14:55. Kings 10–3. Drive: 10 plays • 51 yards • 6:40
- LOU – Tanner Brown 21-yard field goal, 5:08. Kings 13–3. Drive: 13 plays • 66 yards • 7:29
- HOU – John Hoyland 59-yard field goal, 1:07. Kings 13–6. Drive: 5 plays • 14 yards • 0:36.
- LOU – Tanner Brown 58-yard field goal, 0:02. Kings 16–6. Drive: 6 plays • 11 yards • 1:05

Third quarter

- HOU – Marcus Yarns 68-yard run (kick failed), 14:41. Kings 16–12. Drive: 1 play • 68 yards • 0:19
- HOU – Taulia Tagovailoa 6-yard run (John Hoyland kick), 9:50. Gamblers 19–16. Drive: 8 plays • 58 yards • 3:15
- HOU – John Hoyland 50-yard field goal, 2:05. Gamblers 22–16. Drive: 11 plays • 52 yards • 5:54.

Fourth quarter

- LOU – Tanner Brown 52-yard field goal, 14:54. Gamblers 22–19. Drive: 5 plays • 26 yards • 2:11
- LOU – Tanner Brown 48-yard field goal, 10:05. Tied 22–22. Drive: 5 plays • 14 yards • 2:43

Overtime

- LOU – Tre' McKitty two-point conversion pass from Jason Bean. Kings 24–22.

Top passers

- LOU – Jason Bean – 17/34, 192 yards, INT
- HOU – Taulia Tagovailoa – 18/23, 182 yards, 2 TD

Top rushers

- LOU – Jason Bean – 6 rushes, 20 yards
- HOU – Marcus Yarns – 8 rushes, 111 yards, TD

Top receivers

- LOU – JaVonta Payton – 3 receptions, 46 yards
- HOU – Justin Hall – 4 receptions, 44 yards

Down 16–6 at halftime, third-string quarterback Taulia Tagovailoa entered the game at the beginning of the third quarter and led the Gamblers to a 16–8 scoring run in the second half, including 16 unanswered points in the third quarter, which were the only points in that quarter. But it was not enough to beat the previously winless Louisville Kings, who would seal the game with a two-point pass conversion and defensive stop in overtime and pick up their first win in franchise history while dropping the Gamblers to 1–3.

==== Week 5: vs. Columbus Aviators ====
Week 5: Columbus Aviators at Houston Gamblers – Game summary

Quarter	1	2	3	4	Total
Aviators	0	13	0	0	13
Gamblers	7	7	0	3	17

at Shell Energy Stadium • Houston, Texas

- Date: April 26
- Game time: 11:00 a.m. CDT
- Game weather: Partly cloudy, 81 °F (27 °C)
- Game attendance: 5,166
- Referee: Adam Savoie
- TV announcers (ABC): Roy Philpott, Roddy Jones, Harry Douglas and Cole Cubelic
- Game Book

Game information

First quarter

- HOU – Jalen White 1-yard run (John Hoyland kick), 7:51. Gamblers 7–0. Drive: 13 plays • 75 yards • 7:09

Second quarter

- HOU – Nolan Henderson 5-yard run (John Hoyland kick), 13:53. Gamblers 14–0. Drive: 12 plays • 65 yards • 6:51
- CLB – Jalan McClendon 1-yard run (Ryan Coe kick), 8:57. Gamblers 14–7. Drive: 10 plays • 67 yards • 4:56
- CLB – Toa Taua 7-yard run (kick failed), 0:32. Gamblers 14–13. Drive: 8 plays • 46 yards • 3:38

Third quarter

- No scoring plays

Fourth quarter

- HOU – John Hoyland 23-yard field goal, 14:20. Gamblers 17–13. Drive: 10 plays • 31 yards • 5:19

Top passers

- CLB – Jalan McClendon – 15/22, 160 yards
- HOU – Nolan Henderson – 13/25, 146 yards

Top rushers

- CLB – ZaQuandre White – 10 rushes, 38 yards
- HOU – Nolan Henderson – 6 rushes, 37 yards, TD

Top receivers

- CLB – Alizé Mack – 3 receptions, 42 yards
- HOU – Lawrence Keys III – 3 receptions, 43 yards

In a battle of 1–3 teams, the Gamblers stayed home to host yet another expansion team. This time, it was the Columbus Aviators, who upset the Renegades the week prior. The Gamblers raced out to a 14–0 lead in the second half, before allowing back-to-back touchdowns from the Aviators (the latter coming with a missed extra point). After a scoreless third quarter, Houston put the final touches of the game via a 23-yard field goal from John Hoyland, followed by a fumble from Aviators quarterback Jalan McClendon, who was with Houston just last season. Houston snapped its two-game losing streak and improves to 2–3.

==== Week 6: at Columbus Aviators ====
Week 6: Houston Gamblers at Columbus Aviators – Game summary

Quarter	1	2	3	4	Total
Gamblers	7	3	7	0	17
Aviators	7	14	3	0	24

at Historic Crew Stadium • Columbus, Ohio

- Date: May 1
- Game time: 7:00 p.m. CDT
- Game weather: Partly cloudy, 48 °F (9 °C)
- Game attendance: 8,347
- Referee: Francisco Villar
- TV announcers (Fox): Kevin Kugler, Devin Gardner and Jake Butt
- Game Book

Game information

First quarter

- CLB – John Lovett 3-yard run (Ryan Coe kick), 6:40. Aviators 7–0. Drive: 14 plays • 73 yards • 8:20
- HOU – Marcus Majors Jr. 13-yard run (John Hoyland kick), 2:26. Tied 7–7. Drive: 7 plays • 71 yards • 4:14

Second quarter

- CLB – Antwane Wells Jr. 9-yard pass from Jalan McClendon (Ryan Coe kick), 11:21. Aviators 14–7. Drive: 11 plays • 67 yards • 6:05
- HOU – John Hoyland 33-yard field goal, 8:01. Aviators 14–10. Drive: 6 plays • 22 yards • 3:20
- CLB – ZaQuandre White 7-yard run (Ryan Coe kick), 5:44. Aviators 21–10. Drive: 5 plays • 72 yards • 2:17

Third quarter

- CLB – Ryan Coe 48-yard field goal, 9:54. Aviators 24–10. Drive: 6 plays • 37 yards • 3:21
- HOU – Lawrence Keys III 9-yard pass from Taulia Tagovailoa (John Hoyland kick), 0:48. Aviators 24–17. Drive: 5 plays • 57 yards • 2:09

Fourth quarter

- No scoring plays

Top passers

- HOU – Taulia Tagovailoa – 6/10, 65 yards, TD
- CLB – Jalan McClendon – 20/26, 187 yards, TD

Top rushers

- HOU – Nolan Henderson – 2 rushes, 37 yards
- CLB – John Lovett – 17 rushes, 65 yards, TD

Top receivers

- HOU – Justin Hall – 3 receptions, 20 yards
- CLB – Tay Martin – 6 receptions, 103 yards

In a rematch of last week, the Gamblers faced off against the Aviators, this time, on the road. The Aviators struck first, scoring on a 3-yard touchdown run from running back John Lovett, thus taking a 7–0 lead. Houston tied it up by scoring a rushing touchdown of their own. Columbus responded at the start of the second quarter, by having Jalan McClendon throw a 9-yard touchdown pass to Antwane Wells Jr., to retake the lead at 14–7. While John Hoyland managed to cut the deficit to 14–10 courtesy of a 33-yard field goal, the Aviators responded with a 7-yard touchdown run from ZaQuandre White to head into the half with a 21–10 advantage. In the third quarter, the Aviators got a 48-yard field goal to extend the lead to 24–10. The Gamblers attempted a rally, but only managed a 9-yard passing touchdown from Taulia Tagovailoa, which was followed up by a scoreless fourth quarter, sealing the 24–17 Aviators win, dropping the Gamblers to 2–4.

==== Week 7: vs. Orlando Storm ====
Week 7: Orlando Storm at Houston Gamblers – Game summary

Quarter	1	2	3	4	Total
Storm	7	10	0	7	24
Gamblers	3	10	7	3	23

at Shell Energy Stadium • Houston, Texas

- Date: May 10
- Game time: 5:00 p.m. CDT
- Game weather: Partly cloudy, 86 °F (30 °C)
- Game attendance: 4,409
- Referee: Michael Vandervelde
- TV announcers (FS1): Kevin Kugler, Devin Gardner and Jake Butt
- Game Book

Game information

First quarter

- ORL – Elijhah Badger 35-yard pass from Jack Plummer (Michael Lantz kick), 6:43. Storm 7–0. Drive: 3 plays • 50 yards • 1:16
- HOU – John Hoyland 23-yard field goal, 1:28. Storm 7–3. Drive: 12 plays • 67 yards • 5:15

Second quarter

- ORL – D. J. James 18-yard interception return (Michael Lantz kick), 14:06. Storm 14–3.
- HOU – Hunter Dekkers 6-yard run (John Hoyland kick), 11:28. Storm 14–10. Drive: 6 plays • 44 yards • 2:38
- ORL – Michael Lantz 45-yard field goal, 7:47. Storm 17–10. Drive: 11 plays • 81 yards • 3:41
- HOU – John Hoyland 23-yard field goal, 0:03. Storm 17–13. Drive: 10 plays • 54 yards • 1:46

Third quarter

- HOU – Jalen White 49-yard pass from John Rhys Plumlee (Michael Lantz kick), 4:05. Gamblers 20–17. Drive: 6 plays • 64 yards • 3:16

Fourth quarter

- ORL – Elijhah Badger 31-yard pass from Jack Plummer (Michael Lantz kick), 14:53. Storm 24–20. Drive: 8 plays • 79 yards • 4:12
- HOU – John Hoyland 31-yard field goal, 12:08. Storm 24–23. Drive: 6 plays • 18 yards • 2:45

Top passers

- ORL – Jack Plummer – 14/24, 152 yards, 2 TD
- HOU – Hunter Dekkers – 24/41, 268 yards, INT

Top rushers

- ORL – Jashaun Corbin – 7 rushes, 25 yards
- HOU – Marcus Majors Jr. – 6 rushes, 32 yards

Top receivers

- ORL – Elijhah Badger – 4 receptions, 75 yards, 2 TD
- HOU – Jalen Moreno-Cropper – 6 receptions, 68 yards

Although the Gamblers did mount a 14–3 comeback in the second quarter, they still came up short after John Hoyland missed what would've been the lead-taking 63-yard 4-point field goal to drop the team to 2–5. Also, with Hoyland's missed 4-pointer, Defenders kicker Matt McCrane remains the only kicker in UFL history (as of Week 7) to have successfully converted on 4-point field goals, having converted 2 of them this season.

==== Week 8: at St. Louis Battlehawks ====
Week 8: Houston Gamblers at St. Louis Battlehawks – Game summary

Quarter	1	2	3	4	Total
Gamblers	14	6	3	0	23
Battlehawks	3	6	0	7	16

at The Dome at America's Center • St. Louis, Missouri

- Date: May 16
- Game time: 2:00 p.m. CDT
- Game weather: Light rain, 78 °F (26 °C)
- Game attendance: 21,609
- Referee: Kole Knueppel
- TV announcers (ABC): Joe Tessitore, Jordan Rodgers, Brock Osweiler and Tom Luginbill
- Game Book

Game information

First quarter

- STL – Ramiz Ahmed 32-yard field goal, 10:48. Battlehawks 3–0. Drive: 4 plays • 10 yards • 1:53
- HOU – Jontre Kirklin 4-yard pass from Hunter Dekkers (John Hoyland kick), 6:25. Gamblers 7–3. Drive: 8 plays • 66 yards • 4:09
- HOU – Kary Vincent Jr. 35-yard interception return (John Hoyland kick), 4:40. Gamblers 14–3.

Second quarter

- STL – Ramiz Ahmed 44-yard field goal, 13:06. Gamblers 14–6. Drive: 13 plays • 48 yards • 6:34
- HOU – Lawrence Keys III 35-yard pass from Hunter Dekkers (kick failed), 3:26. Gamblers 20–6. Drive: 8 plays • 81 yards • 4:05
- STL – Ramiz Ahmed 25-yard field goal, 0:18. Gamblers 20–9. Drive: 4 plays • 9 yards • 0:25

Third quarter

- HOU – John Hoyland 37-yard field goal, 5:02. Gamblers 23–9. Drive: 11 plays • 46 yards • 5:50

Fourth quarter

- STL – Tyler Neville 7-yard pass from Luis Perez (Ramiz Ahmed kick), 10:36. Gamblers 23–16. Drive: 7 plays • 56 yards • 3:46

Top passers

- HOU – Hunter Dekkers – 15/22, 155 yards, 2 TD, INT
- STL – Luis Perez – 26/47, 308 yards, TD, 2 INT

Top rushers

- HOU – Kirk Merritt – 2 rushes, 22 yards
- STL – Jarveon Howard – 9 rushes, 31 yards

Top receivers

- HOU – Jalen Moreno-Cropper – 5 receptions, 52 yards
- STL – Steven McBride – 8 receptions, 116 yards

The Gamblers took a 23–9 third quarter lead and never looked back, en route to pulling off the upset against the Battlehawks to improve themselves to 3–5.

==== Week 9: vs. St. Louis Battlehawks ====
Week 9: St. Louis Battlehawks at Houston Gamblers – Game summary

Quarter	1	2	3	4	Total
Battlehawks	0	10	8	3	21
Gamblers	6	3	6	0	15

at Shell Energy Stadium • Houston, Texas

- Date: May 24
- Game time: 6:00 p.m. CDT
- Game weather: Sunny, 85 °F (29 °C)
- Game attendance: 6,217
- Referee: Jason Autrey
- TV announcers (ESPN2): Lowell Galindo, Roddy Jones, Cole Cubelic and Harry Douglas
- Game Book

Game information

First quarter

- HOU – JaVonta Payton 7-yard pass from Hunter Dekkers (kick failed), 6:58. Gamblers 6–0. Drive: 3 plays • 43 yards • 1:28

Second quarter

- HOU – John Hoyland 28-yard field goal, 12:07. Gamblers 9–0. Drive: 8 plays • 58 yards • 4:02
- STL – Ramiz Ahmed 36-yard field goal, 4:17. Gamblers 9–3. Drive: 5 plays • 26 yards • 2:47
- STL – Hakeem Butler 38-yard pass from Luis Perez (Ramiz Ahmed kick), 0:01. Battlehawks 10–9. Drive: 4 plays • 68 yards • 0:25

Third quarter

- HOU – Kirk Merritt 4-yard run (two-point run failed), 10:26. Gamblers 15–10. Drive: 5 plays • 69 yards • 2:16
- STL – Kylin James 2-yard run (Jarveon Howard two-point run), 3:48. Battlehawks 18–15. Drive: 12 plays • 74 yards • 6:38

Fourth quarter

- STL – Ramiz Ahmed 34-yard field goal, 2:56. Battlehawks 21–15. Drive: 10 plays • 27 yards • 5:46

Top passers

- STL – Luis Perez – 26/39, 239 yards, TD, INT
- HOU – John Rhys Plumlee – 11/21, 131 yards, INT

Top rushers

- STL – Jarveon Howard – 14 rushes, 55 yards
- HOU – Marcus Yarns – 13 rushes, 98 yards

Top receivers

- STL – Steven McBride – 6 receptions, 76 yards
- HOU – Jalen Moreno-Cropper – 4 receptions, 103 yards

Despite leading 9–0 at the beginning of the second quarter, the Gamblers were listless once again as they allowed the Battlehawks to go on a 21–6 scoring run, with the last time the Gamblers led in the game being a 15–10 lead in the third quarter. With the loss, the Gamblers not only fell to 3–6, but were also eliminated from playoff contention.

==== Week 10: at Birmingham Stallions ====
Week 10: Houston Gamblers at Birmingham Stallions – Game summary

Quarter	1	2	3	4	Total
Gamblers	3	14	6	3	26
Stallions	0	0	7	6	13

at Protective Stadium • Birmingham, Alabama

- Date: May 30
- Game time: 2:00 p.m. CDT
- Game weather: Thunderstorm, 79 °F (26 °C)
- Game attendance: 5,253
- Referee: Chris Coyte
- TV announcers (ESPN2): Lowell Galindo, Roddy Jones, Cole Cubelic and Harry Douglas
- Game Book

Game information

First quarter

- HOU – John Hoyland 33-yard field goal, 4:05. Gamblers 3–0. Drive: 10 plays • 45 yards • 4:46

Second quarter

- HOU – Marcus Majors Jr. 1-yard run (John Hoyland kick), 12:24. Gamblers 10–0. Drive: 8 plays • 50 yards • 3:36
- HOU – John Rhys Plumlee 11-yard run (John Hoyland kick), 6:45. Gamblers 17–0. Drive: 3 plays • 57 yards • 1:19

Third quarter

- BIR – Alex Cook 70-yard interception return (Anders Carlson kick), 8:43. Gamblers 17–7.
- HOU – Marcus Majors Jr. 72-yard run (kick failed), 8:26. Gamblers 23–7. Drive: 1 plays • 72 yards • 0:17

Fourth quarter

- BIR – Kyric McGowan 6-yard pass from Dorian Thompson-Robinson (two-point pass failed), 2:02. Gamblers 23–13. Drive: 7 plays • 48 yards • 3:25
- HOU – John Hoyland 46-yard field goal, 6:09. Gamblers 26–13. Drive: 8 plays • 50 yards • 5:20

Top passers

- HOU – John Rhys Plumlee – 11/23, 119 yards, INT
- BIR – Dorian Thompson-Robinson – 13/27, 112 yards, TD

Top rushers

- HOU – Marcus Majors Jr. – 8 rushes, 80 yards, 2 TD
- BIR – Snoop Conner – 7 rushes, 25 yards

Top receivers

- HOU – Lawrence Keys III – 2 receptions, 52 yards
- BIR – Jaydon Mickens – 3 receptions, 42 yards

One week after being eliminated from playoff contention, the Gamblers played spoiler to their rival the Stallions, who needed a win and a Louisville loss to clinch a spot in the playoffs. This win not only gave them both a 4–6 finish and their first ever sweep of the Stallions, but it also eliminated their rivals from playoff contention for the first time in franchise history.

== Standings ==
2026 UFL standings
Team	W	L	PCT	GB	TD+/-	TD+	TD-	PF	PA	DIFF	STK
(y) Orlando Storm	8	2	.800	–	9	26	17	232	186	46	W4
(x) St. Louis Battlehawks	6	4	.600	2	-2	21	23	212	197	15	L1
(x) Louisville Kings	6	4	.600	2	1	27	26	265	219	46	W4
(x) DC Defenders	5	5	.500	3	6	31	25	281	224	57	L4
(e) Dallas Renegades	4	6	.400	4	2	30	28	224	259	-35	W1
(e) Birmingham Stallions	4	6	.400	4	-1	24	25	190	229	-39	L2
(e) Houston Gamblers	4	6	.400	4	-6	20	26	189	236	-60	W1
(e) Columbus Aviators	3	7	.300	5	-6	27	33	216	259	-43	L1
(x)–clinched playoff berth; (y)–clinched conference; (e)–eliminated from playoff contention
