= Harrison Frost =

American gridiron football player (born 1998)

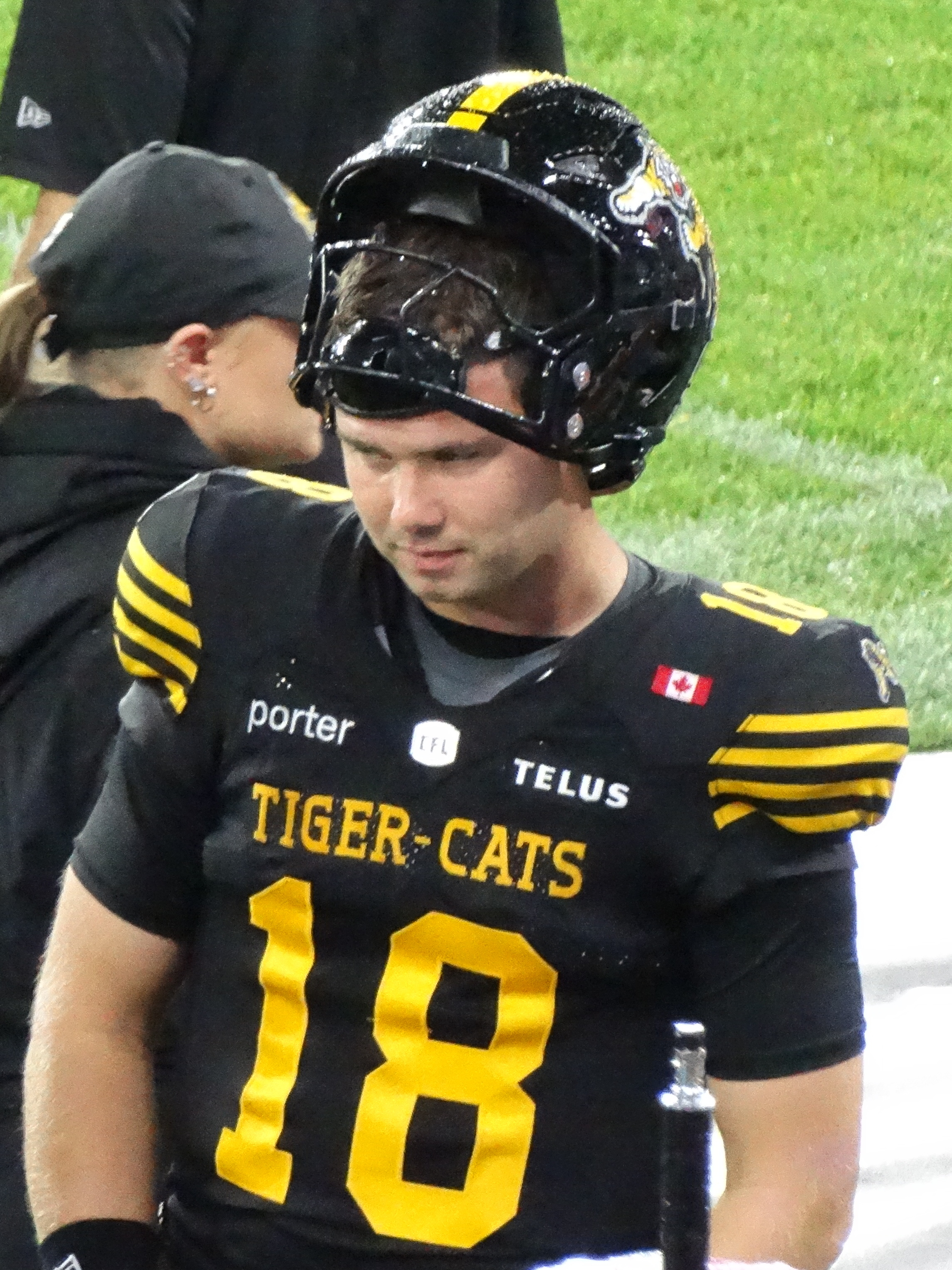
- Frost with the Hamilton Tiger-Cats in 2026

No. 18 – Hamilton Tiger-Cats
- Position: Quarterback
- Roster status: Active
- CFL status: American

Personal information
- Born: December 18, 1998 (age 27)
- Listed height: 6 ft 1 in (1.85 m)
- Listed weight: 195 lb (88 kg)

Career information
- High school: Harrison (Kennesaw, Georgia)
- College: Mercer (2017–2020); West Georgia (2021–2022)
- NFL draft: 2023: undrafted

Career history

Playing
- Seattle Sea Dragons (2023); Hamilton Tiger-Cats (2024–2025); St. Louis Battlehawks (2026); Hamilton Tiger-Cats (2026–present)

Coaching
- Virginia (2023) Graduate assistant

Career CFL statistics as of 2026
- Passing completions: 164
- Passing attempts: 264
- Completion percentage: 62.1
- TD–INT: 13–10
- Passing yards: 1,936
- Passer rating: 85
- Stats at CFL.ca

Harrison Frost (born December 18, 1998) is an American professional football quarterback for the Hamilton Tiger-Cats of the Canadian Football League (CFL). He played college football for the Mercer Bears and the West Georgia Wolves.

== Early life ==
Frost attended Harrison High School in Kennesaw, Georgia. During his senior season, he served as the primary backup to Justin Fields. In limited action, Frost completed 11 of 15 pass attempts for 120 yards and one touchdown.

== College career ==
Frost began his collegiate career at Mercer. He redshirted his true freshman season. Frost appeared in 27 games over three seasons and passed 1,047 yards with nine touchdowns and eight interceptions. Frost transferred to West Georgia in 2021. In his first season with the Wolves, he passed for a school-record 3,618 yards and 25 touchdowns. Frost passed for 3,112 yards and 25 touchdowns in 2022.

== Professional career ==
Pre-draft measurables
Height	Weight
6 ft 1 in (1.85 m)	194 lb (88 kg)
Values from Pro Day

=== Seattle Sea Dragons ===
Frost was signed by the Seattle Sea Dragons of the XFL in January 2023.

=== Hamilton Tiger-Cats (first stint) ===
Frost was signed by the Hamilton Tiger-Cats of the Canadian Football League. In his first season with the team, he completed 8 of 12 passes for 95 yards and one touchdown. Frost re-signed with the Tiger-Cats on March 13, 2024. In 2025, he dressed in five games while spending the rest of the season on the injured list. He was released in the following offseason on February 21, 2026.

=== St. Louis Battlehawks ===
Frost with the St. Louis Battlehawks

On February 27, 2026, Frost signed with the St. Louis Battlehawks of the United Football League. Frost began the season as the backup quarterback to Brandon Silvers. In Week 3 against the Birmingham Stallions, he replaced an inefficient Silvers on the final possession of the first half with the Battlehawks leading 13–7. On the first possession of the second half, Frost threw an interception that was returned for a touchdown by Mario Goodrich on his first pass attempt. Trailing 23–13 in the fourth quarter, Frost threw three touchdown passes, including a 64-yard touchdown to Hakeem Butler and an 11-yard go-ahead touchdown to tight end Tyler Neville in the final two minutes, helping secure a 34–30 victory. In the game, Frost completed 9 of 15 passes for 148 yards and three touchdowns with two interceptions. Following the victory, Frost was named the team's starting quarterback. He struggled the following week against the DC Defenders, completing just 6 of 21 passes for 144 yards and two interceptions, though he threw a 75-yard touchdown pass to Butler, as the Battlehawks lost 28–22. Frost and the Battlehawks rebounded over the next two weeks with victories against the Orlando Storm and Louisville Kings. Heading into the matchup against the Columbus Aviators, Frost was benched in favor of Luis Perez, who had been acquired in a trade two weeks earlier.

=== Hamilton Tiger-Cats (second stint) ===
On July 15, 2026, Frost signed with the Tiger-Cats. On August 1, he entered the game against the Calgary Stampeders, replacing the ineffective Tre Ford. Frost completed nine of 20 passes for 165 yards, one touchdown, one interception and lost a fumble which was returned for a touchdown. On August 6, he was named the starter against the BC Lions in Week 10. In his first career start in the CFL, he completed 20 of 33 pass attempts for 239 yards with one touchdown pass and interception as the Tiger-Cats lost on a last-minute field goal to Lions. In the following week against the Saskatchewan Roughriders, he had 12 completions from 16 attempts with 112 passing yards and one touchdown before suffering an injury and being replaced by Ford at the start of the second half, who led the team to a victory, giving Frost his first win as a starter.

== Career statistics ==
=== CFL ===
Year	Team	Games			Passing								Rushing			
Year	Team	GD	GS	Record	Cmp	Att	Pct	Yds	Y/A	TD	Int	Rtg	Att	Yds	Avg	TD
2024	HAM	12	0	—	8	12	66.7	95	7.9	1	0	118.4	0	0	0.0	0
2025	HAM	5	0	—	DNP											
2026	HAM	12	6	2–4	156	252	61.9	1,841	7.3	12	10	83.4	10	62	6.2	0
Career		29	6	2–4	164	264	62.1	1,936	7.3	13	10	85.0	10	62	6.2	0

=== XFL/UFL ===
Year	Team	League	Games			Passing								Rushing			
Year	Team	League	GP	GS	Record	Cmp	Att	Pct	Yds	Y/A	TD	Int	Rtg	Att	Yds	Avg	TD
2023	SEA	XFL	0	0	—	DNP											
2026	STL	UFL	4	3	2–1	57	107	53.3	719	6.7	7	6	72.9	16	26	1.6	1
Career			4	3	2–1	57	107	53.3	719	6.7	7	6	72.9	16	26	1.6	1

=== College ===
Season	Team	Games			Passing								Rushing			
Season	Team	GP	GS	Record	Cmp	Att	Pct	Yds	Y/A	TD	Int	Rtg	Att	Yds	Avg	TD
2017	Mercer	0	0	—	Redshirted (redshirt)											
2018	Mercer	8	3	1–2	34	82	41.5	445	5.4	3	3	91.8	10	–18	–1.8	0
2019	Mercer	11	0	—	6	8	75.0	101	12.6	2	1	238.6	0	0	0.0	0
2020	Mercer	8	4	0–4	47	79	59.5	501	6.3	4	4	119.3	14	–22	–1.6	1
2021	West Georgia	12	12	9–3	304	475	64.0	3,618	7.6	25	9	141.6	14	–27	–1.6	1
2022	West Georgia	10	10	8–2	244	405	60.2	3,112	7.7	25	9	140.7	21	78	3.7	1
FCS career		27	7	1–6	87	167	1,047	51.5	6.2	9	8	111.6	24	–40	–1.7	1
D-II career		22	22	17–5	548	880	6,730	62.3	7.6	50	18	141.2	35	51	1.5	1

== Coaching career ==
Frost spent the 2023 college football season as a graduate assistant for the Virginia Cavaliers.
