= Brian VanGorder =

American football player and coach (born 1959)

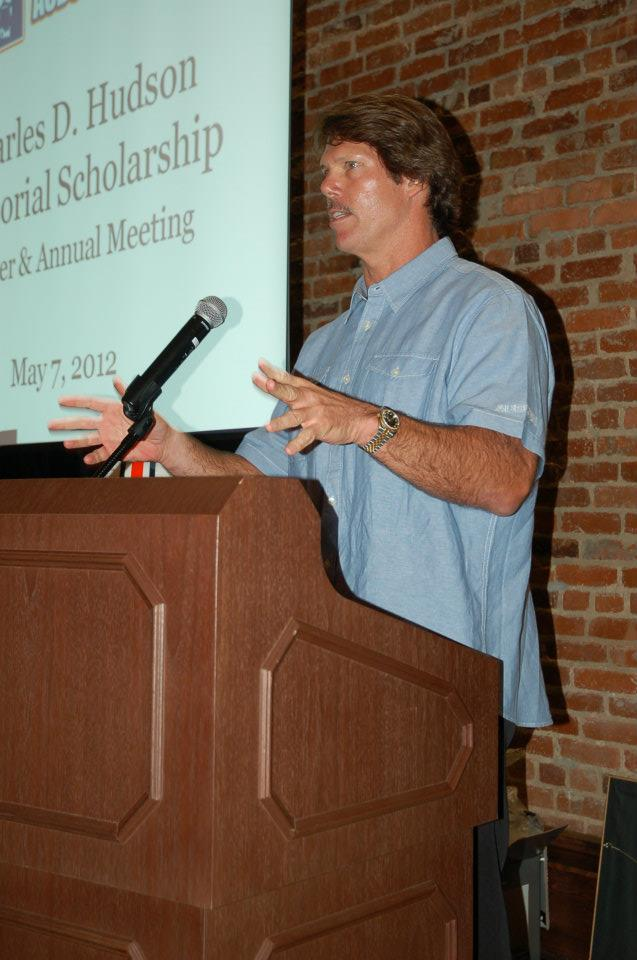
- Brian VanGorder, 2012

Current position
- Title: Defensive Coordinator
- Team: Gulf Shores HS

Biographical details
- Born: April 17, 1959 (age 67); Jackson, Michigan, U.S.

Playing career
- 1977–1980: Wayne State (MI)
- Position: Linebacker

Coaching career (HC unless noted)
- 1981: West Bloomfield HS (MI) (assistant)
- 1982–1983: Boca Raton Academy (FL)
- 1984–1987: American Heritage School (FL)
- 1988: Boca Raton Community HS (FL)
- 1989–1990: Grand Valley State (LB)
- 1991: Grand Valley State (DC/LB)
- 1992–1994: Wayne State (MI)
- 1995–1996: UCF (LB/ST)
- 1997: UCF (AHC/DC)
- 1998–1999: Central Michigan (DC)
- 2000: Western Illinois (DC/LB)
- 2001–2004: Georgia (DC/LB)
- 2005: Jacksonville Jaguars (LB)
- 2006: Georgia Southern
- 2007: Atlanta Falcons (LB)
- 2008–2011: Atlanta Falcons (DC)
- 2012: Auburn (DC)
- 2013: New York Jets (LB)
- 2014: Notre Dame (DC/ILB)
- 2015–2016: Notre Dame (DC)
- 2016: Georgia (DA)
- 2017: Oklahoma State (DA)
- 2018: Louisville (DC)
- 2019–2020: Bowling Green (DC)
- 2021: Gulf Shores HS (DC)
- 2022: American Heritage School (FL)
- 2023-present: Gulf Shores HS (DC)

Accomplishments and honors

Awards
- Broyles Award (2003)

Brian VanGorder (born April 17, 1959) is an American football coach and former player. He was the defensive coordinator at Bowling Green State University, a position he assumed in 2019. Prior to that, he was defensive coordinator at the University of Louisville. He served as the head football coach at Wayne State University from 1992 to 1994, and Georgia Southern University in 2006, compiling a career college football record of 19–25. VanGorder was the defensive coordinator for the Atlanta Falcons of the National Football League (NFL) from 2008 to 2011, and also worked in the same capacity for the University of Georgia (2001–2004) and Auburn University (2012).

== Personal life ==
VanGorder is married to the former Ruth Jones. His children are Molloy, Morgan, Mack, Montgomery, Malone, and Freddie.

== Coaching career ==
VanGorder started his coaching career in 1981 as an assistant coach at West Bloomfield High School. He served as the head coach at three high schools in the state of Florida, including Boca Raton Academy (now the Boca Raton campus of Pine Crest School). VanGorder posted a record of 52–16 and was named "Coach of the Year" on seven occasions. VanGorder's 1987 American Heritage School team was ranked No. 1 in the state of Florida. He joined the college ranks in 1989 at Grand Valley State University.

VanGorder had his first head coaching opportunity from 1992 to 1994 at his alma mater, Wayne State University. During his final two seasons as head coach, Wayne State recorded its first winning record in more than a decade, going 6–5 in each season. From there was a three-year stint at the University of Central Florida, where he spent two years coaching linebackers and special teams before being assigned to assistant head coach/defensive coordinator. From 1998 to 1999, VanGorder served as the defensive coordinator at Central Michigan University, After Central Michigan, VanGorder was the defensive coordinator during the 2000 season at Western Illinois University. The Leathernecks ended the year 9–2 and finished eighth nationally in passing efficiency defense and 12th in both passing defense and total defense while allowing just 17.6 points per game.

In 2001, he was hired as defensive coordinator and linebackers coach at the University of Georgia. During his first year as defensive coordinator in 2001, the Bulldogs allowed just 18.9 points per game, ended up fifth in rushing defense and ranked 17th in scoring defense. The 2002 season saw VanGorder's defense not only lead the SEC in scoring defense, but finished fourth nationally. The Bulldogs allowed less than 15 points per game during the season on their way to eventually winning the Sugar Bowl and finishing third in the final national poll. For his performance, VanGorder named as the seventh recipient of the Valvoline Southern Sports Tonight Assistant Coach of the Year.

In 2003, VanGorder's defense ranked third nationally in scoring defense, fourth in total defense and sixth in passing defense. In turn, VanGorder received the Frank Broyles "Assistant Coach of the Year" award (Broyles Award), which honors the nation's top assistant coach. During his final season at Georgia in 2004, the 10–2 Bulldogs were ranked seventh in the final national poll as VanGorder's defense finished the season ranked eighth and ninth in scoring defense.

During his Georgia tenure, six of VanGorder's players were selected in the first two rounds of the NFL Draft, including defensive tackle Johnathan Sullivan, safety Thomas Davis and defensive end David Pollack in the first round, and safety Sean Jones and linebackers Boss Bailey, as well as Odell Thurman in the second round. During his four years at Georgia the Bulldogs defense only gave up 30 points one time, against LSU in the 2003 SEC Championship Game.

In 2005 VanGorder was hired as the Jacksonville Jaguars linebackers coach, and he only served one year with the Jaguars before being hired as the head coach for the Georgia Southern Eagles on December 9, 2005. VanGorder resigned after finishing his only season at 3–8, the Eagles' then-worst record in the program's modern history. On December 19, 2007 VanGorder was named defensive coordinator and linebackers coach at South Carolina. Five weeks later, on January 24, 2008, ESPN reported that VanGorder would leave to join new Atlanta Falcons head coach Mike Smith's staff as their defensive coordinator.

On January 9, 2012, VanGorder was hired by Auburn University coach Gene Chizik as defensive coordinator. He replaced Ted Roof, who departed for the defensive coordinator position at the University of Central Florida.

On December 28, 2013, just hours after winning the 2013 Pinstripe Bowl, the University of Notre Dame announced VanGorder will take over as defensive coordinator, replacing Bob Diaco, who took over as head football coach at the University of Connecticut.

He was terminated only four games into the 2016 season, on September 25.

VanGorder announced his retirement from coaching college football in 2021 and became the defensive coordinator at Gulf Shores High School in Alabama under Mark Hudspeth.

In December 2021, VanGorder became the head coach for American Heritage School's Palm Beach campus. He resigned in March 2023 after a 2-7 season.

== Head coaching record ==
Year	Team	Overall	Conference	Standing	Bowl/playoffs
Wayne State Tartars (Midwest Intercollegiate Football Conference) (1992–1994)
1992	Wayne State	4–7	3–7	T–7th	
1993	Wayne State	6–5	5–5	T–6th	
1994	Wayne State	6–5	6–4	T–4th	
Wayne State:		16–17	14–16		
Georgia Southern Eagles (Southern Conference) (2006)
2006	Georgia Southern	3–8	2–5	T–5th	
Georgia Southern:		3–8	2–5		
Total:		19–25			
