= Justin Hall (American football) =

American football player (born 1999)

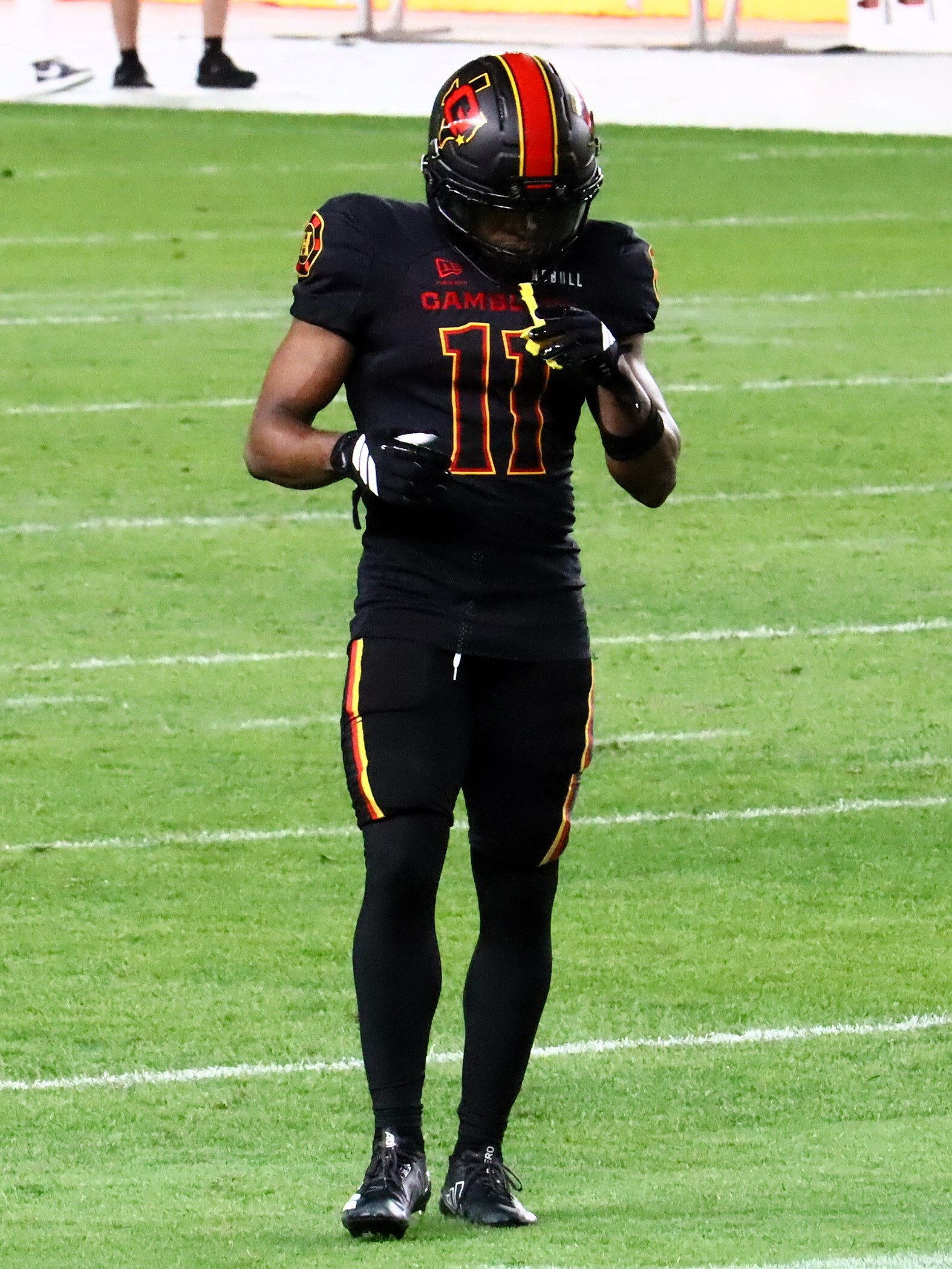
- Hall with the Houston Gamblers in 2026

No. 11 – Dallas Renegades
- Position: Wide receiver
- Roster status: Active

Personal information
- Born: January 29, 1999 (age 27)
- Listed height: 5 ft 8 in (1.73 m)
- Listed weight: 188 lb (85 kg)

Career information
- High school: Robert S. Alexander (Douglasville, Georgia)
- College: Ball State (2017–2021)
- NFL draft: 2022: undrafted

Career history
- Las Vegas Raiders (2022)*; Houston Gamblers / Roughnecks (2023–2024); Minnesota Vikings (2024)*; Houston Roughnecks / Gamblers (2025–2026); Dallas Renegades (2027–present)
- * Offseason or practice squad member only

Awards and highlights
- All-USFL Team (2023); 2× UFL reception leader (2024, 2025); 2× First-team All-MAC (2019, 2020); Second-team All-MAC (2017)

Justin Terrell Hall (born January 29, 1999) is an American professional football wide receiver for the Dallas Renegades of the United Football League (UFL). He played college football for the Ball State Cardinals.

== Early life ==
Born in Douglasville, Georgia, Hall began playing football at Alexander High School and then committed to play college football at Ball State University.

== College career ==
In his first season, he was first among freshmen in receiving yards (801) and with 78 receptions he was 10th nationally, collecting at least five receptions in nine of his 12 games.

For both the 2019 and 2020 seasons, Hall was recognized as one of the best players in the conference and named to the first-team All-Mid-American Conference, in 2020 as both a wide receiver and kick returner. In the game on December 20, 2020, Hall contributed to the 38–28 victory against the Buffalo Bulls, scoring the touchdown in the momentary 21–21 tie, which earned the Cardinals the title of conference champions, the first since 1996.

In 2021, Hall took advantage of the opportunity offered to extend his college football eligibility by a year, given the limitations on leagues due to the COVID-19 pandemic in 2020, then playing another season with the Cardinals.

Hall set school records for number of receptions (318), yards received (3,385) and yards gained in total (5,359). On January 3, 2022, Hall declared himself eligible for the 2022 NFL draft.

== Professional career ==
Pre-draft measurables
Height	Weight	Arm length	Hand span	Wingspan	40-yard dash	10-yard split	20-yard split	20-yard shuttle	Three-cone drill	Vertical jump	Broad jump	Bench press
5 ft 8 3/8 in (1.74 m)	189 lb (86 kg)	29 7/8 in (0.76 m)	8 3/4 in (0.22 m)	6 ft 0 1/8 in (1.83 m)	4.58 s	1.56 s	2.53 s	4.35 s	7.04 s	35.0 in (0.89 m)	9 ft 7 in (2.92 m)	11 reps
All values from Pro Day

=== Las Vegas Raiders ===
Hall went undrafted in the 2022 NFL draft and signed as an undrafted free agent with the Las Vegas Raiders on May 12, 2022. Hall was released by the Raiders on August 28, 2022.

=== Houston Gamblers / Roughnecks (first stint) ===
Hall signed with the Houston Gamblers of the United States Football League. Hall and all other Gamblers players and coaches were all transferred to the Houston Roughnecks after it was announced that the Gamblers took on the identity of their XFL counterpart, the Roughnecks. His contract was terminated on August 15, 2024, to sign with an NFL team.

=== Minnesota Vikings ===
Hall signed with the Minnesota Vikings on August 19, 2024. He was waived by the Vikings during the team's first round of roster cuts on August 26.

=== Houston Roughnecks / Gamblers (second stint) ===
On October 31, 2024, Hall re-signed with the Roughnecks.

On January 13, 2026, Hall was selected onto the Houston Gamblers' reserve list of the United Football League (UFL).

== Career statistics ==
=== USFL/UFL ===
Legend
	Led the league
**Bold**	Career high

Year	Team	League	Games		Receiving				
Year	Team	League	GP	GS	Rec	Yds	Avg	Lng	TD
2023	HOU	USFL	**10**	7	47	513	**10.9**	41T	**4**
2024	HOU	UFL	**10**	**9**	56	**604**	10.8	**63T**	3
2025	HOU	UFL	**10**	7	**62**	501	8.11	46	3
2026	HOU	UFL	9	5	30	281	9.3	21	1
Career			39	28	195	1,899	9.7	63	11

=== College ===
Year	Team	Games		Receiving						Rushing			
Year	Team	GP	GS	Rec	Yds	Avg	YPG	Lg	TD	Att	Yds	Avg	TD
2017	Ball State	**12**	**10**	**78**	**801**	10.27	66.8	47t	3	11	59	5.36	0
2018	Ball State	**12**	6	69	622	9.01	51.8	61	0	20	133	6.65	1
2019	Ball State	**12**	5	61	684	11.21	57.0	64t	**6**	24	187	7.79	2
2020	Ball State	7	6	49	665	**13.57**	**95.0**	**66t**	4	30	**236**	**7.87**	1
2021	Ball State	11	9	53	540	10.19	49.1	49t	4	**33**	225	6.82	**5**
Career		54	36	310	3,312	10.68	61.3	66t	17	118	840	7.12	9

Career personal bests are in bold
