= Brandon Silvers =

American football player (born 1994)

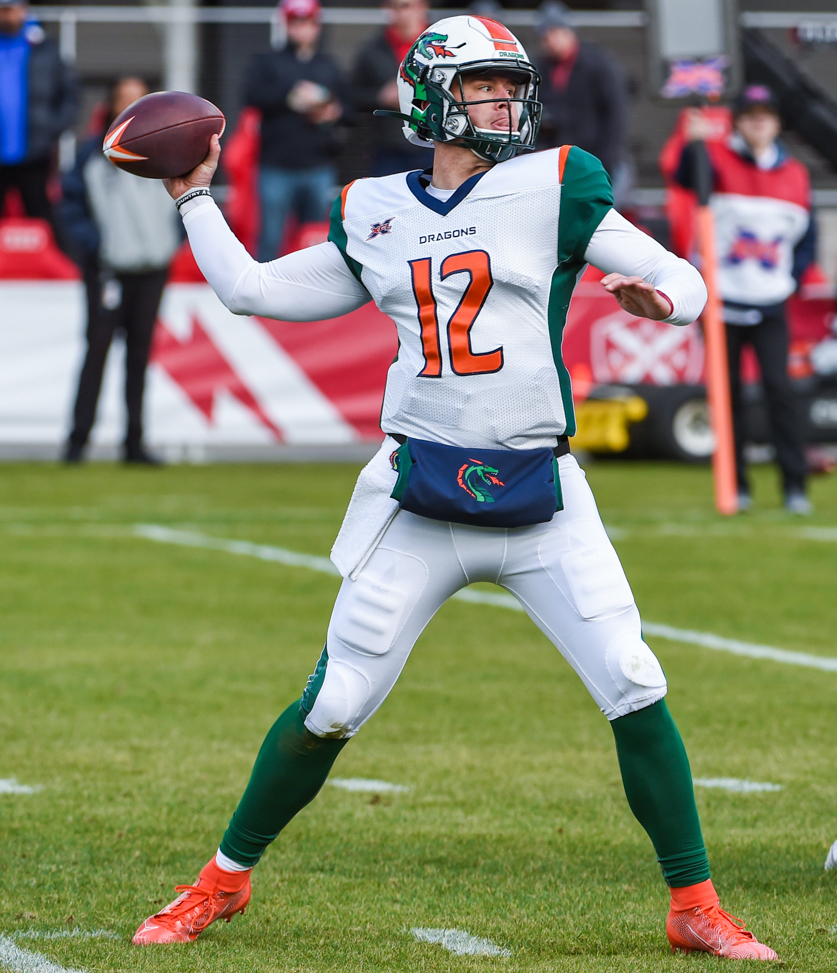
- Silvers with the Seattle Dragons in 2020

No. 12
- Position: Quarterback

Personal information
- Born: May 9, 1994 (age 32); Pensacola, Florida, U.S.
- Listed height: 6 ft 2 in (1.88 m)
- Listed weight: 220 lb (100 kg)

Career information
- High school: Gulf Shores (Gulf Shores, Alabama)
- College: Troy (2013–2017)
- NFL draft: 2018: undrafted

Career history
- Memphis Express (2019); New York Jets (2019)*; Seattle Dragons (2020); Houston Roughnecks (2023); St. Louis Battlehawks (2024–2026)
- * Offseason or practice squad member only

Awards and highlights
- First-team All-Sun Belt (2016)

William Brandon Silvers (born May 9, 1994) is an American former professional football quarterback. He played college football for the Troy Trojans.

== Early life ==
William Brandon Silvers was born to Rae Ann and Jeff Silvers on May 9, 1994, in Pensacola, Florida. He has one brother, Chase. His uncle, Carey Christensen, played starting quarterback for the Foley Lions and Troy Trojans, helping the latter to win the 1984 NCAA Division II Football Championship. His aunt, Metta Christensen Stapleton, was a star basketball player for the Foley Lions and South Alabama Jaguars.

Silvers first started as quarterback his junior year at Gulf Shores High School in Gulf Shores, Alabama. He threw for 2,468 yards and 26 touchdowns. Silvers had a 54% completion rating his senior year, with 201 attempts for 1,400 yards and 6 touchdowns. He also rushed for 410 yards on 116 carries and nine touchdowns. At the time, ESPN ranked him as the 27th best high school quarterback in the country.

== College career ==
Silvers began playing for the Troy Trojans in 2014, where he set an NCAA record for the highest completion percentage by a freshman. After 2 losing seasons, Silver led the 2016 Trojans to a 10–3 record and a victory in the Dollar General Bowl over Ohio. For his efforts, he was named First-team All-Sun Belt. 2017 would see Silvers lead the Trojans to another winning record and a Sun Belt Conference co-championship. His final season would be capped off with a victory in the New Orleans Bowl against North Texas. He declared for the NFL draft shortly after. In his 4 years at Troy University, Silvers passed for 10,677 yards, 71 touchdowns, and 29 interceptions with a 64.4% completion rating, while also adding 415 rushing yards and 16 touchdowns on 237 attempts. He ended his college career with a passing rating of 135.8. As of 2022, Silvers is second all-time for passing yards and passing touchdowns at Troy.

== Professional career ==
Pre-draft measurables
Height	Weight	Arm length	Hand span	Wingspan	40-yard dash	10-yard split	20-yard split	20-yard shuttle	Three-cone drill	Vertical jump	Broad jump
6 ft 2 1/2 in (1.89 m)	220 lb (100 kg)	29 1/2 in (0.75 m)	9 1/8 in (0.23 m)	6 ft 1 3/8 in (1.86 m)	5.06 s	1.75 s	2.96 s	4.78 s	7.68 s	28.0 in (0.71 m)	8 ft 7 in (2.62 m)
All values from Pro Day

After going undrafted in the 2018 NFL draft, Silvers was invited to the New Orleans Saints rookie minicamp, but was not signed to a contract.

=== Memphis Express ===
He was selected by the Memphis Express of the Alliance of American Football (AAF) during the 2019 AAF QB Draft. He started the 2019 season as the third-string quarterback behind Christian Hackenberg and Zach Mettenberger.

Hackenberg was demoted to third string after several weeks of poor play and an injury sidelined Mettenberger in week 6. Silvers then began splitting time with recently signed Johnny Manziel. Silvers and Manziel combined to lead the Express to just its second victory of the season in week 7. Silvers passed for the game-winning touchdown in overtime to beat the Birmingham Iron. With Manziel suffering an injury early in week 8, Silvers played the bulk of the game against the top-ranked Orlando Apollos. Silvers nearly pulled off an upset before losing 34–31, with a late interception by Silvers.

Silvers started two games for the Express, passing for 799 yards, 4 touchdowns, 2 interceptions, and had a 64% completion rating.

=== New York Jets ===
On April 10, 2019, Silvers signed with the New York Jets of the NFL. He was waived on May 6, 2019.

=== Seattle Dragons ===
On October 15, 2019, Silvers was chosen to be the first quarterback of the Seattle Dragons of the XFL. He signed a contract with the team on November 4, 2019. He had his contract terminated when the league suspended operations on April 10, 2020.

=== The Spring League ===
Silvers signed with the Conquerors of The Spring League in May 2021. Silvers would be a part of the Conquerors Week 1 roster. In the 2021 season, Silvers would go on to lead the league in passer rating, guiding his team to a 4–2 record. Unfortunately, the Conquerors would fall short of making the championship game. Silvers finished his first season in the Spring League with 685 passing yards, 9 touchdowns, 1 interception, and a passer rating of 127.3.

Silvers signed with the United States Football League (USFL) after the deadline to be included in the 2022 USFL draft and was included in the supplemental draft, but went undrafted.

=== Houston Roughnecks ===
On September 29, 2022, XFL reporter Mike Mitchell reported that 8 quarterbacks that worked with Jordan Palmer have reportedly signed with each team. Silvers was signed to the Houston Roughnecks. Silvers started 8 of the Roughnecks' 10 games and led them to the playoffs.

=== St. Louis Battlehawks ===
On February 14, 2024, Silvers was signed by the St. Louis Battlehawks of the United Football League (UFL). In St. Louis, Silvers has primarily served as backup to fellow Alabama native A. J. McCarron and Manny Wilkins. Silvers re-signed with the Battlehawks on April 22, 2025, following McCarron's departure and injuries to Wilkins and Chevan Cordeiro. He served as the backup to Max Duggan, saw action in two regular season games, started the week 10 contest, and entered the XFL Conference Championship in relief of Duggan before suffering a broken scapula on an extra point attempt.

Silvers was the only quarterback from 2025 that the Battlehawks kept in the 2026 UFL draft, reuniting with offensive coordinator A. J. Smith, his offensive coordinator when he started for the Roughnecks. Silvers was named the Battlehawks' starter entering the 2026 season and started the first three games of the season before being benched for Harrison Frost and later being relegated to third-string behind Frost and Luis Perez.

== Career statistics ==
=== Professional ===
Year	Team	League	Games			Passing								Rushing			
Year	Team	League	GP	GS	Record	Cmp	Att	Pct	Yds	Y/A	TD	Int	Rtg	Att	Yds	Avg	TD
2019	MEM	AAF	5	2	1–1	80	125	64.0	799	6.4	4	2	86.1	4	22	5.5	0
2020	SEA	XFL	4	4	1–3	53	102	52.0	539	5.2	6	4	70.7	6	16	2.7	0
2021	CNQ	TSL	4	2	2–0	55	80	68.8	685	8.6	9	1	127.3	4	5	1.3	0
2023	HOU	XFL	8	8	6–2	156	262	59.5	1,551	5.9	13	9	78.6	9	-2	-0.2	0
2024	STL	UFL	1	0	—	0	0	0.0	0	0.0	0	0	0.0	0	0	0.0	0
2025	STL	UFL	2	1	1–0	13	18	72.2	205	11.4	1	0	128.2	6	-6	-1.0	0
2026	STL	UFL	3	3	2–1	44	78	56.4	460	5.9	2	3	66.2	8	14	1.8	0
Career			27	20	13–7	401	665	60.3	4,239	6.4	35	19	84.5	37	49	1.3	0

=== College ===
Legend
NCAA record (for freshman)

Season	Team	Games			Passing								Rushing			
Season	Team	GP	GS	Record	Cmp	Att	Pct	Yds	Y/A	TD	Int	Rtg	Att	Yds	Avg	TD
2013	Troy	0	0	—	Redshirted (redshirt)											
2014	Troy	11	11	3–8	191	271	70.5	1,836	6.8	11	3	138.6	100	196	2.0	5
2015	Troy	11	11	4–7	202	330	61.2	2,378	7.2	20	7	137.5	41	41	1.0	2
2016	Troy	13	13	10–3	293	460	63.7	3,180	6.9	23	12	133.0	48	128	2.7	4
2017	Troy	13	13	11–2	283	443	63.9	3,290	7.4	17	7	135.8	48	50	1.0	5
Career		48	48	28–20	969	1,504	64.4	10,684	7.1	71	29	135.8	237	415	1.8	16
