= Orange Beach Middle & High School =

Public school in Alabama, United States

Coordinates: 30°17′22″N 87°37′06″W

Location
- 23908 Canal Road; Orange Beach, Baldwin County, Alabama; United States

Information
- Established: 2020; 6 years ago
- School district: Orange Beach City Schools (formerly Baldwin County Board of Education)
- Teaching staff: 44.00 (FTE)
- Enrollment: 662 (2024-2025)
- Student to teacher ratio: 15.05
- Colors: Royal Blue, Orange, and White
- Mascot: Mako

Orange Beach Middle & High School is a public middle and high school located in Orange Beach, Alabama, United States. It is part of the Orange Beach City Schools; it was formerly in the Baldwin County School District.

== History ==
In 2017, the Baldwin County School Board voted to build a new high school for Orange Beach.

The school, which was established with funds from both the city and the county school district, began construction in May 2018. Because Gulf Shores High School, previously of the county school district, separated in 2019, the county temporarily had portable classrooms for Orange Beach and students in unincorporated areas previously zoned to Gulf Shores who wanted to immediately begin attending Baldwin County schools instead of staying with the now-independent Gulf Shores schools. The complex as a whole had a cost of $34 million, with $10 million to the auditorium. On August 10, 2020, the school held its opening ceremony.

On July 1, 2022, the school moved into being in the Orange Beach school district; it was formerly in the Baldwin County district.

The school mascot is the Mako and the school colors are Royal Blue, Orange & White.
