= Tucker McCann =

American football player (born 1997)

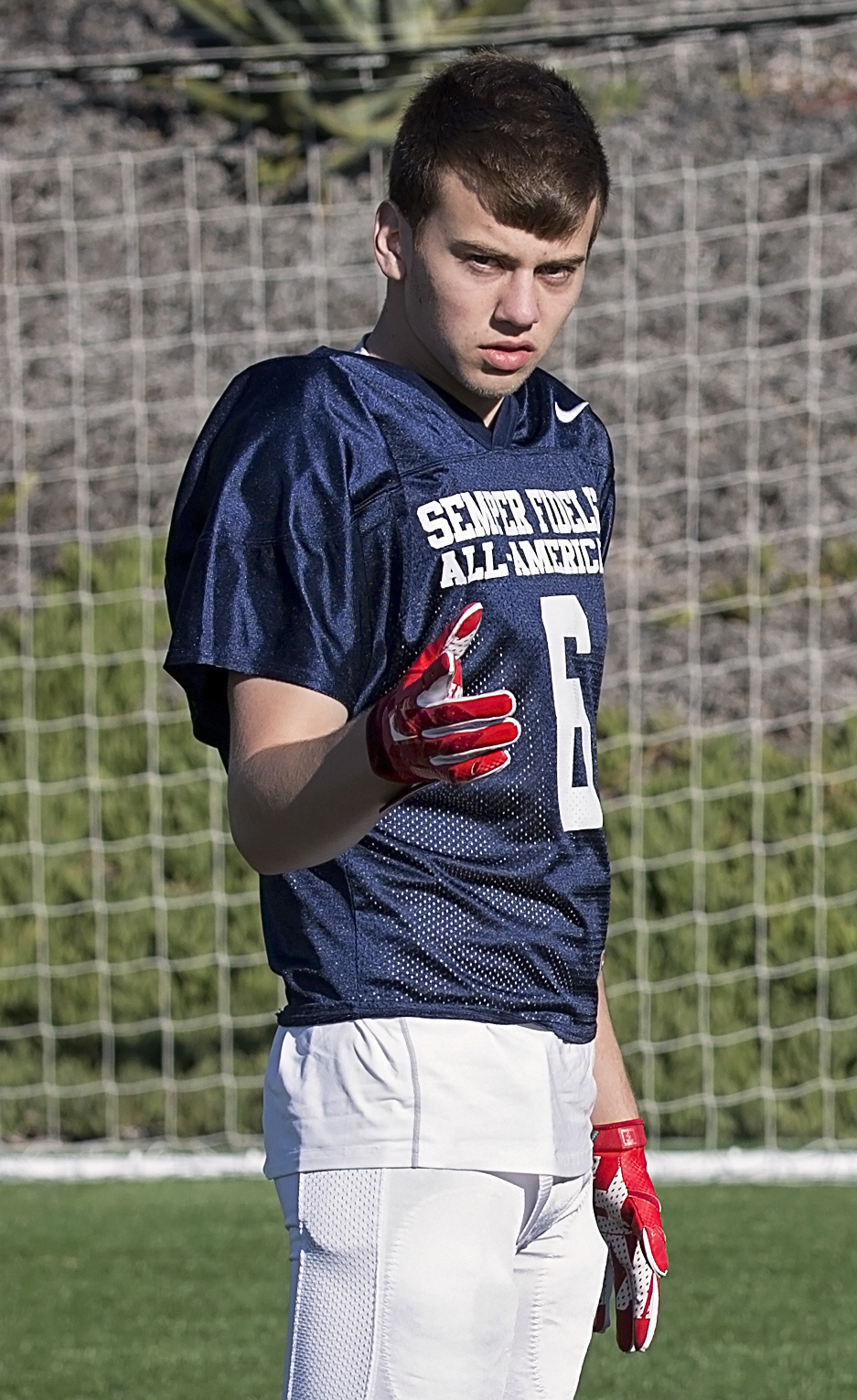
- McCann in 2016

Profile
- Position: Placekicker

Personal information
- Born: November 10, 1997 (age 28); O'Fallon, Illinois, U.S.
- Listed height: 6 ft 2 in (1.88 m)
- Listed weight: 215 lb (98 kg)

Career information
- High school: O'Fallon (IL)
- College: Missouri (2016–2019)
- NFL draft: 2020: undrafted

Career history
- Tennessee Titans (2020–2021)*; St. Louis Battlehawks (2026)
- * Offseason or practice squad member only
- Stats at Pro Football Reference

Tucker McCann (born November 10, 1997) is an American football placekicker. He played college football at Missouri.

== Early life ==
A native of O'Fallon, Illinois, McCann attended O'Fallon Township High School where he was the team's starting kicker from his sophomore to senior years. As a junior, he broke the Illinois state record for longest field goal at 60 yards. A consensus three star recruit, he received offers from Alabama, Florida State, and Missouri. He committed to Missouri on June 8, 2015.

== College career ==
McCann was the Tigers starting kicker all four years he attended Missouri. As a senior, he added punting duties in addition to his placekicking duties. McCann became the first person in the 21st century to have four punts of 50+ yards and make three field goals from 40+ yards in a 50–0 win over Southeast Missouri State.

== Professional career ==
Pre-draft measurables
| Height | Weight |
|---|---|
| 6 ft 0 3/4 in (1.85 m) | 215 lb (98 kg) |
Values from Pro Day

=== Tennessee Titans ===
After going undrafted in the 2020 NFL draft, McCann signed with the Tennessee Titans as an undrafted free agent. He was waived by Tennessee on September 5, 2020, and was re-signed to the team's practice squad the following day. McCann was placed on the practice squad/injured list by the team on November 7.

McCann was signed to a futures contract by the Titans on January 11, 2021. He was waived/injured on August 23, and subsequently placed on injured reserve. McCann was released by the Titans on October 5.

=== St. Louis Battlehawks ===
On January 14, 2026, McCann was selected by the St. Louis Battlehawks of the United Football League (UFL). He was released by the Battlehawks on June 11.

== Career statistics ==
=== UFL ===
| Year | Team | GP | Field goals | | | | Points |
| Year | Team | GP | FGA | FGM | Lng | Pct | Points |
|---|---|---|---|---|---|---|---|
| 2026 | STL | 4 | 10 | 11 | 58 | 90.9 | 36 |
| Career | | 4 | 10 | 11 | 58 | 90.9 | 36 |
