= Gulf Shores City Schools =

School district in Alabama

Gulf Shores City Schools (GSCS), also known as Gulf Shores Board of Education (GSBOE), is a school district headquartered in Gulf Shores, Alabama in the United States.

As of 2021 it had about 2,500 pupils.

== History ==
Previously Gulf Shores was in the Baldwin County School District. In 2017 all members of the Gulf Shores city council voted to establish the city's own school system. In 2019 the Baldwin County district and Gulf Shores made a formal agreement for Gulf Shores to separate.

On June 1, 2019 the school district formally started its operations. This made it the first school district to separate from the Baldwin County district.

The school district was scheduled to begin operations in 2019. The anticipated initial enrollment was 2,250.

== Schools ==
- Gulf Shores High School
- Gulf Shores Middle School
- Gulf Shores Elementary School
