= John Hoyland (American football) =

American football player (born 2003)

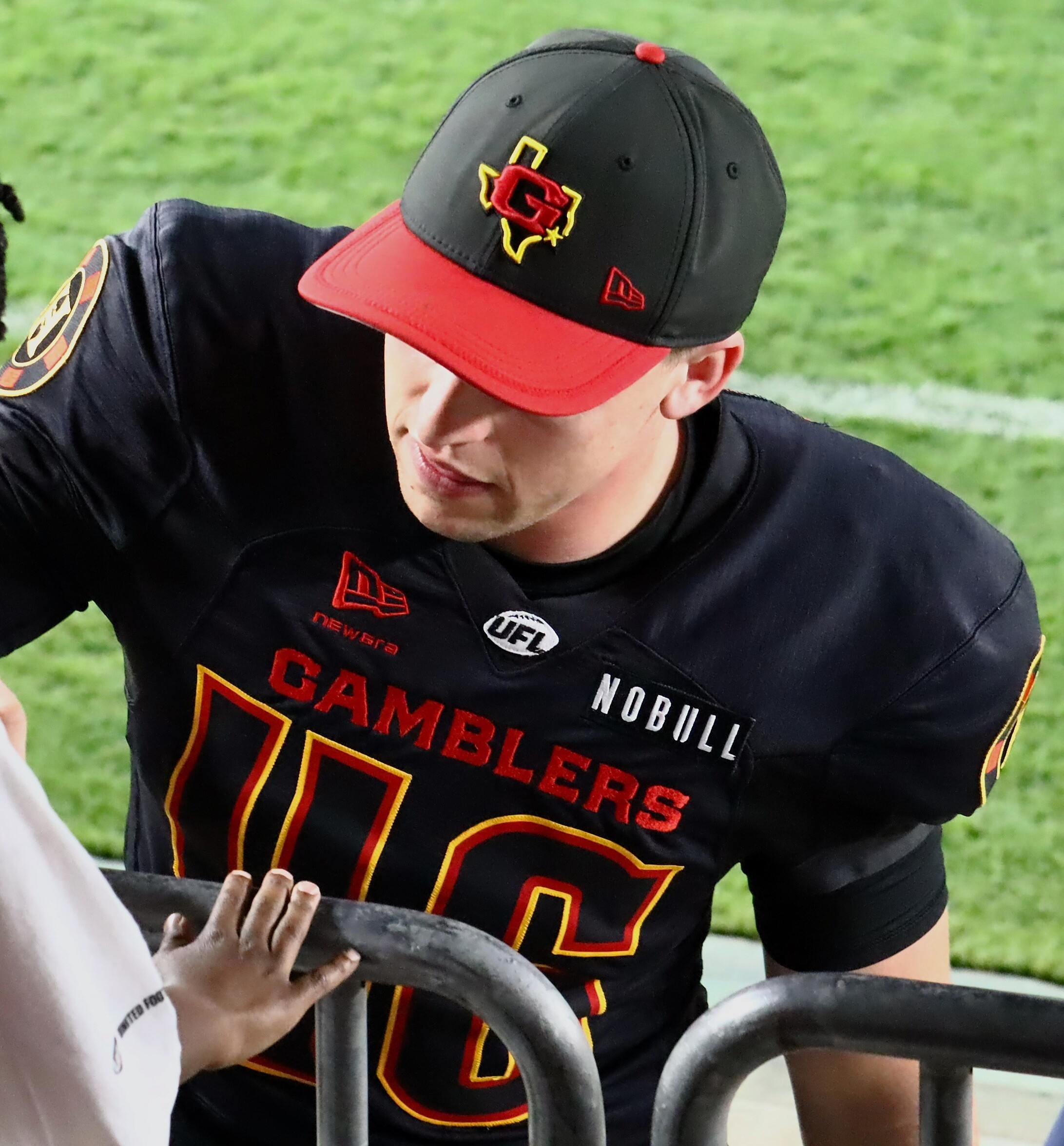
- Hoyland with the Houston Gamblers in 2026

No. 46 – Dallas Renegades
- Position: Kicker
- Roster status: Active

Personal information
- Born: February 11, 2003 (age 23); Broomfield, Colorado, U.S.
- Listed height: 5 ft 10 in (1.78 m)
- Listed weight: 201 lb (91 kg)

Career information
- High school: Legacy (Broomfield, Colorado)
- College: Wyoming (2020–2024)
- NFL draft: 2025: undrafted

Career history
- Baltimore Ravens (2025)*; Houston Gamblers (2026); Dallas Renegades (2027–present)
- * Offseason or practice squad member only

Awards and highlights
- First-team All-Mountain West (2022); Second-team All-Mountain West (2020)

John Hoyland (born February 11, 2003) is an American professional football kicker for the Dallas Renegades of the United Football League (UFL). He played college football for the Wyoming Cowboys.

== Early life ==
Hoyland attended Legacy High School in Broomfield, Colorado, and committed to play college football for the Wyoming Cowboys, joining the team as walk-on.

== College career ==
During the 2020 season, Hoyland made 13 of 14 field goal attempts, earning FWAA Freshman All-America and second-team all-Mountain West honors. In the 2021 season, he converted on 10 of 14 fields goals. During the 2022 season, Hoyland made 22 of 25 field goal attempts and was named as a semifinalist for the Lou Groza Award. In the 2023 Arizona Bowl, he hit a walk-off, game-winning, 24-yard field goal, in a 16–15 win over Toledo, where for his performance he was named the game's MVP. In the 2023 season, Hoyland converted on 13 of 20 field goal attempts. In week 2 of the 2024 season, he set the program career record for most made field goals, in a victory versus Idaho. During his final collegiate season in 2024, Hoyland converted on 15 of 19 field goal attempts. He finished his career as the Cowboys' all-time leading scorer with 366 total points.

== Professional career ==
Pre-draft measurables
Height	Weight	Arm length	Hand span	Wingspan
5 ft 10 3/8 in (1.79 m)	201 lb (91 kg)	28 5/8 in (0.73 m)	8 7/8 in (0.23 m)	5 ft 10 1/4 in (1.78 m)
All values from Pro Day

=== Baltimore Ravens ===
After not being selected in the 2025 NFL draft, Hoyland signed with the Baltimore Ravens as an undrafted free agent, where he competed for the starting job with Tyler Loop. He was waived on August 2, 2025.

=== Houston Gamblers ===
On January 13, 2026, Hoyland was selected by the Houston Gamblers in the 2026 UFL Draft. On April 5, 2026, Hoyland helped the Houston Gamblers secure their first win of the season in a Week 2 game against the Birmingham Stallions. He converted all five of his field goal attempts, including a game-winning 50-yard field goal as time expired in the fourth quarter.

== Career Statistics ==
=== UFL ===
Year	Team	GP	Field goals				Points
Year	Team	GP	FGA	FGM	Lng	Pct	Points
2026	HOU	10	22	18	59	81.8	67
Career		10	22	18	59	81.8	67
