= Gulf Shores High School =

Public high school in Gulf Shores, Alabama, United States

Location
- 600 East 15th Avenue; Gulf Shores, Alabama 36542; United States
- Coordinates: 30°16′09″N 87°40′34″W

Information
- School type: Public
- School district: Gulf Shores City Schools (2019-); Baldwin County Public Schools (-2019)
- CEEB code: 011334
- NCES School ID: 010020202473
- Principal: Cindy Veazey
- Teaching staff: 55.50 (FTE)
- Grades: 9–12
- Enrollment: 882 (2023–24)
- Student to teacher ratio: 15.89
- Campus type: Suburban
- Colors: Teal, Navy Blue & White
- Athletics conference: AHSAA 6A
- Mascot: Splash
- Nickname: Dolphins
- Website: www.gsboe.org/gshs

Gulf Shores High School is a public high school located in Gulf Shores, Alabama, United States. The school serves grades 9–12 and is part of the Gulf Shores City Schools district. The school is at the center of a plan to build a combination high school-junior college campus which would alleviate overcrowding at the present school while providing a close link with Coastal Alabama Community College.

Gulf Shores High School's mascot is the dolphin.

== History ==
It was a part of the Baldwin County School District until 2019, when Gulf Shores's own school district was established.

The school served Orange Beach and several unincorporated areas prior to the 2019 separation. For the 2019-2020 school year Orange Beach grade 7-10 students and grade 7-10 students in unincorporated areas had a choice between remaining with Gulf Shores schools or attending temporary classrooms established by Baldwin County schools. Orange Beach Middle and High School opened in 2020.

== Administration ==
Along with Gulf Shores Elementary and Middle Schools, Gulf Shores High School is now part of the Gulf Shores City Schools system following the split from the Baldwin County school system, made official on June 3, 2019.

School principal, Cindy Veazey, was a principal previously at Wetumpka High School. Veazey was set to become principal of the new Orange Beach Middle and High School. However, she was appointed back to her position following the school split.

== Notable alumnus ==
- Brandon Silvers (2012) professional football quarterback who played college football at Troy
- Ronnie Royal [2023] Plays college football at NC State.
