= Jarveon Howard =

American football player (born 1999)

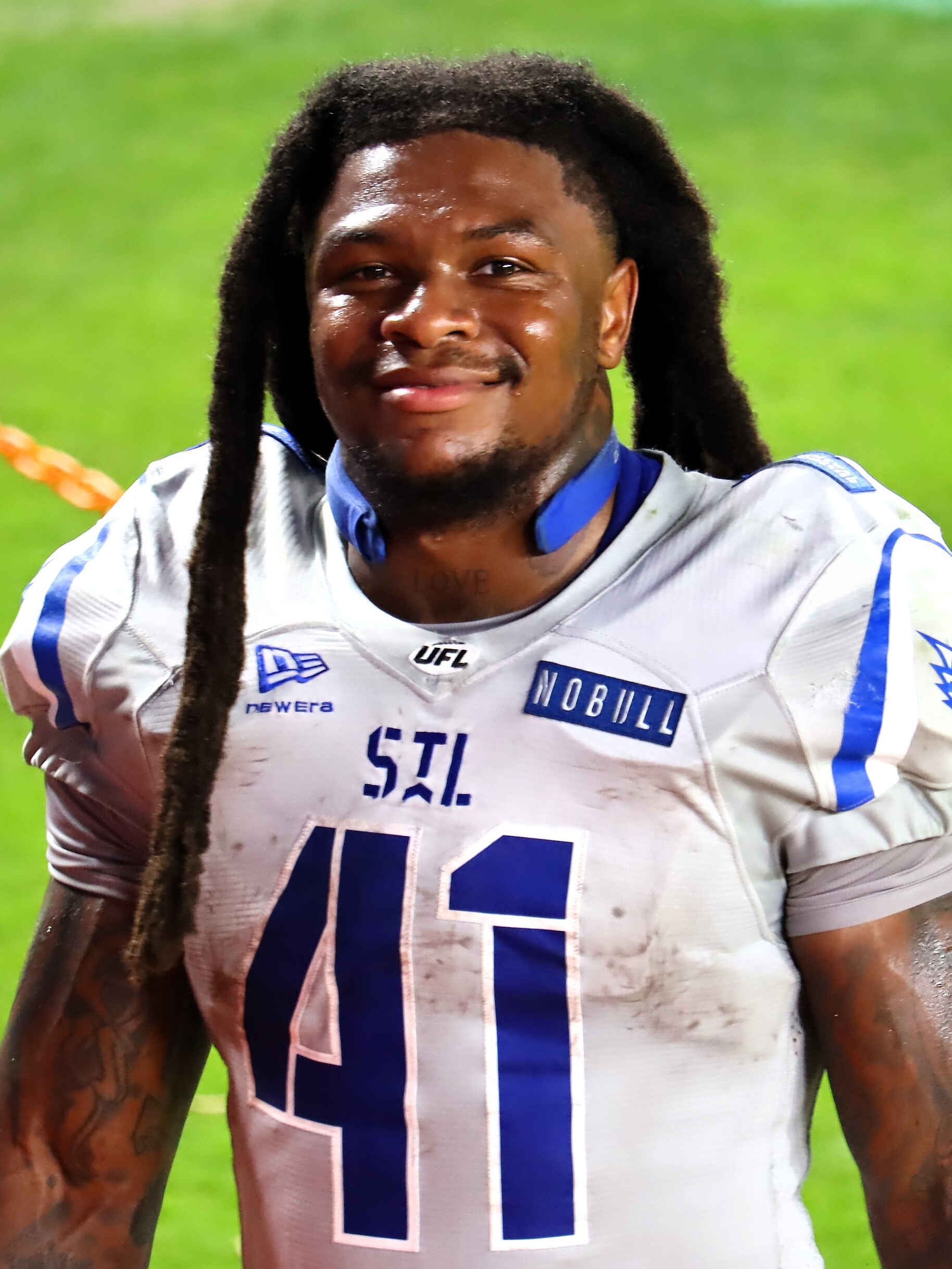
- Howard in 2026

No. 41 – St. Louis Battlehawks
- Position: Running back
- Roster status: Active

Personal information
- Born: November 13, 1999 (age 26); Hattiesburg, Mississippi, U.S.
- Listed height: 5 ft 10 in (1.78 m)
- Listed weight: 222 lb (101 kg)

Career information
- High school: East Marion (Columbia, Mississippi)
- College: Syracuse (2018–2021); Alcorn State (2022–2023)
- NFL draft: 2024: undrafted

Career history
- Green Bay Packers (2024)*; St. Louis Battlehawks (2025); Buffalo Bills (2025)*; St. Louis Battlehawks (2026–present)
- * Offseason or practice squad member only

Awards and highlights
- First-team All-SWAC (2023)

Jarveon LeQuez Howard (born November 13, 1999) is an American professional football running back for the St. Louis Battlehawks of the United Football League (UFL). He played college football for the Syracuse Orange and Alcorn State Braves.

== Early life ==
Howard grew up in Columbia, Mississippi and attended East Marion High School, where he lettered in football and baseball. During his senior year, he rushed for 1,508 yards and 21 touchdowns on 118 carries. He also added 11 receptions for 203 yards and two scores, along with making 83 tackles on defense. He was also an outfielder and pitcher for the baseball team. He was a three-star rated recruit and committed to play college football at Syracuse University.

== College career ==
=== Syracuse ===
During Howard's true freshman season in 2018, he played in 12 games, finishing the season with 68 rushing attempts for 315 yards and seven touchdowns. He also added a reception for 16 yards. During the 2019 season, he appeared in 11 games, finishing the season with 76 rushing attempts for 337 yards and three touchdowns. He also added nine receptions for 53 yards.

Howard did not participate during the 2020 season.

During the 2021 season, he played in three games, finishing the season with seven rushing attempts for 79 yards, along with adding a reception for eight yards.

On September 27, 2021, after playing against Liberty, Howard entered the NCAA transfer portal.

=== Alcorn State ===
Three weeks after entering the transfer portal, Howard announced that he would transfer to Alcorn State.

During the 2022 season, he played in 11 games, finishing the season with 250 rushing attempts for 1,275 yards and 12 touchdowns. He also added eight receptions for 41 yards and a touchdown, along with a solo and assisted tackle. He was also named the Newcomer of the Year and on the BOXTOROW All-America Team.

During the 2023 season, he played in 11 games, finishing the season with 153 rushing attempts for 773 yards and seven touchdowns, along with adding 29 receptions for 184 yards. He also was named to the All-SWAC First Team.

=== Statistics ===
Year	Team	Games		Rushing				Receiving			
Year	Team	GP	GS	Att	Yards	Avg	TD	Rec	Yards	Avg	TD
2018	Syracuse	12	0	68	315	4.6	7	1	16	16.0	0
2019	Syracuse	11	0	76	337	4.4	3	9	53	5.9	0
2020	Syracuse	0	0	Did not participate							
2021	Syracuse	3	0	7	79	11.3	0	1	8	8.0	0
2022	Alcorn State	11	11	253	1,270	5.0	12	7	39	5.6	1
2023	Alcorn State	11	10	154	772	5.0	7	26	172	6.6	0
Career		48	21	558	2,773	5.0	29	44	288	6.5	1

== Professional career ==
Pre-draft measurables
Height	Weight	Arm length	Hand span	Wingspan	40-yard dash	10-yard split	20-yard split	20-yard shuttle	Three-cone drill	Vertical jump	Broad jump	Bench press
5 ft 9 7/8 in (1.77 m)	219 lb (99 kg)	30 1/2 in (0.77 m)	9 1/8 in (0.23 m)	6 ft 1 1/2 in (1.87 m)	4.53 s	1.57 s	2.62 s	4.46 s	7.15 s	36.5 in (0.93 m)	10 ft 8 in (3.25 m)	28 reps
All values from HBCU Combine/Pro Day

=== Green Bay Packers ===
On April 30, 2024, Howard signed with the Green Bay Packers as an undrafted free agent. He was waived/injured on August 20, 2024.

=== St. Louis Battlehawks ===
On December 6, 2024, Howard signed with the St. Louis Battlehawks of the United Football League (UFL).

=== Buffalo Bills ===
On August 19, 2025, Howard signed with the Buffalo Bills, but was waived/injured by the team the following day.

=== St. Louis Battlehawks (second stint) ===
On January 14, 2026, Howard was drafted by the St. Louis Battlehawks.

== Career statistics ==
=== UFL ===
==== Regular season ====
Year	Team	Games		Rushing					Receiving				
Year	Team	GP	GS	Att	Yds	Avg	Lng	TD	Rec	Yds	Avg	Lng	TD
2025	STL	10	1	68	310	4.6	74	3	8	42	4.2	11	0
2026	STL	10	5	110	456	4.2	51	0	20	125	12.5	26	0
Career		20	6	178	766	4.3	74	3	28	167	8.3	26	0
