= Tyler Neville =

American football player (born 2001)

No. 81 – St. Louis Battlehawks
- Position: Tight end
- Roster status: Active

Personal information
- Born: March 1, 2001 (age 25); Maryland, U.S.
- Listed height: 6 ft 3 in (1.91 m)
- Listed weight: 239 lb (108 kg)

Career information
- High school: Lafayette (Williamsburg, Virginia)
- College: Harvard (2020–2023); Virginia (2024)
- NFL draft: 2025: undrafted

Career history
- Dallas Cowboys (2025)*; St. Louis Battlehawks (2026–present)
- * Offseason or practice squad member only

Awards and highlights
- All-UFL Team (2026)

Tyler Neville (born March 1, 2001) is an American professional football tight end for the St. Louis Battlehawks of the United Football League (UFL). He played college football at Harvard and Virginia and was signed by the Dallas Cowboys of the National Football League (NFL) as an undrafted free agent in 2025.

== Early life ==
Neville was born on March 1, 2001, in Maryland, the fourth of six children. He was born deaf and underwent surgery at age three, which restored his hearing. However, issues with his nose, throat and ears required at least 20 further surgeries, including at least 12 operations on his ears by the time he was 18. He took speech therapy and could fully hear and speak by fourth grade.

Neville grew up playing sports and attended Lafayette High School in Williamsburg, Virginia, where he made the varsity basketball team as a freshman. However, he had difficulty breathing during practices, and it was later discovered that he had sunken chest syndrome, a condition where his breastbone was placing pressure on his heart and lungs. As a result, he had to have another surgery where a 13-inch (330 mm) metal bar was inserted into his chest. He was told he would not be able to play football or lacrosse, but continued playing basketball while wearing an EvoShield chest protector.

The following year, when he was age 15, Neville had more chest problems, which were discovered to be stage 2 Hodgkin lymphoma. He underwent chemotherapy for eight months before becoming cancer-free. While undergoing chemotherapy, he still attended every basketball practice and played in every game. He averaged 13.0 points and 8.0 rebounds while helping the team win its first Bay Rivers District championship that season.

Neville still hoped to play football, and he lifted weights at home. However, shortly after being declared cancer-free, he suffered a fractured back while working out, needing spinal fusion surgery on his L4 and L5 vertebrae. After the surgery, he had to relearn how to walk. After recovering, he was able to have the metal bar in his chest removed, and he received the clearance to play football as a junior. Neville played tight end and caught 18 passes for 404 yards and five touchdowns. In the next basketball season, he posted a team-leading 18.6 points and 14.8 rebounds per game. He then served as team captain in football as a senior and was named all-state. In basketball, he finished as a two-time all-state selection, three-time all-region selection, and the district player of the year. He committed to play college football for the Harvard Crimson.

He founded the Tyler Neville Foundation in 2021 to help children with cancer.

== College career ==
Neville enrolled at Harvard in 2020, but the football season was canceled due to the COVID-19 pandemic. He then played for the first time in 2021 and caught 12 passes for 113 yards. In the 2022 season, he posted 26 receptions for 302 yards and four touchdowns while being named first-team All-Ivy League. He then recorded 24 catches for 283 yards and four touchdowns in 2023 while helping Harvard to their first Ivy League championship since 2015. Pro Football Focus (PFF) ranked him the fourth-best tight end at run blocking in the NCAA Division I for the 2023 season. Neville was named first-team All-Ivy League a second time and finished his stint with the Crimson having recorded 62 receptions for 698 yards and eight touchdowns.

Having another year of eligibility, Neville entered the NCAA transfer portal and transferred to the Virginia Cavaliers for his final season in 2024. With the Cavaliers, he started 12 games and totaled 37 receptions for 394 yards with two touchdowns. After the season, he was invited to the East–West Shrine Bowl.

== Professional career ==
Pre-draft measurables
Height	Weight	Arm length	Hand span	Wingspan	40-yard dash	10-yard split	20-yard split	20-yard shuttle	Three-cone drill	Vertical jump	Broad jump	Bench press
6 ft 3 in (1.91 m)	239 lb (108 kg)	31 3/8 in (0.80 m)	9 1/2 in (0.24 m)	6 ft 4 3/8 in (1.94 m)	4.81 s	1.59 s	2.72 s	4.32 s	7.12 s	33.0 in (0.84 m)	9 ft 10 in (3.00 m)	22 reps
All values from Pro Day

=== Dallas Cowboys ===
After going unselected in the 2025 NFL draft, Neville signed with the Dallas Cowboys as an undrafted free agent. He was waived by the Cowboys on August 25, 2025.

=== St. Louis Battlehawks ===
On January 14, 2026, Neville was selected by the St. Louis Battlehawks of the United Football League (UFL). In a May 8 game against the Houston Gamblers, Neville suffered a season–ending Lisfranc injury to his foot. Prior to the injury, he had recorded 13 receptions for 125 yards and four touchdowns.
