= JaVonta Payton =

American football player (born 1998)

No. 7 – Dallas Renegades
- Position: Wide receiver
- Roster status: Active

Personal information
- Born: October 7, 1998 (age 28)
- Listed height: 6 ft 0 in (1.83 m)
- Listed weight: 180 lb (82 kg)

Career information
- High school: Hillsboro (Nashville, Tennessee)
- College: Northwest Mississippi C.C. (2017–2018); Mississippi State (2019–2020); Tennessee (2021)
- NFL draft: 2022: undrafted

Career history
- Arizona Cardinals (2022)*; Orlando Guardians (2023); Arlington Renegades (2023–2025); Louisville Kings (2026); Houston Gamblers (2026); Dallas Renegades (2027–present)
- * Offseason or practice squad member only

Awards and highlights
- XFL champion (2023)

JaVonta Cosby Payton (born October 7, 1998) is an American football wide receiver for the Dallas Renegades of the United Football League (UFL). He played college football at Mississippi State, and Tennessee. He played for the Arizona Cardinals of the National Football League (NFL), as well as the Orlando Guardians of the XFL.

== Early life ==
Payton attended and played high school football at Hillsboro High School in Nashville, Tennessee. He was considered a three-star recruit by Rivals.com.

== College career ==
=== Northwest Mississippi C.C. ===
Payton attended Northwest Mississippi Community College from 2017 to 2018 where he played 21 games, while recording 67 catches for 840 yards, and two touchdowns.

=== Mississippi State University ===
Payton transferred to Mississippi State University in 2019, where he played in 22 games between 2019 and 2020, and recorded 28 receptions for 372 yards and one touchdown.

=== University of Tennessee ===
Payton transferred to the University of Tennessee in 2021, where he played and started in all 12 games, and recorded 18 catches for 413 yards, and six touchdowns. On January 17, 2022, Payton declared for the 2022 NFL draft.

== Professional career ==
Pre-draft measurables
Height	Weight	Arm length	Hand span	Wingspan	40-yard dash	10-yard split	20-yard split	20-yard shuttle	Three-cone drill	Vertical jump	Broad jump
6 ft 0 3/8 in (1.84 m)	175 lb (79 kg)	31 3/4 in (0.81 m)	9 1/4 in (0.23 m)	6 ft 4 1/2 in (1.94 m)	4.45 s	1.58 s	2.60 s	4.68 s	7.59 s	33.0 in (0.84 m)	10 ft 0 in (3.05 m)
All values from Pro Day

=== Arizona Cardinals ===
After going undrafted in the 2022 NFL draft, Payton signed with the Arizona Cardinals on May 1, 2022. He was released on August 30. On September 14, Payton was re-signed to the Cardinals' practice squad, but was released the following day..

=== Orlando Guardians ===
On January 23, 2023, Payton signed with the Orlando Guardians of the XFL.

=== Arlington Renegades ===
On March 6, 2023, Payton was traded from the Guardians to the Arlington Renegades of the XFL in a three-team trade with the Orlando Guardians, where Orlando received offensive tackle TJ Storment and the DC Defenders received tight end Alex Ellis. On May 13, Payton won the 2023 XFL Championship with the Renegades, recording two receptions for 23 yards.

After the XFL's 2023 season, on July 15, Payton worked out for the Philadelphia Eagles. However, Payton re-signed with the Renegades on January 22, 2024. He was placed on injured reserve on May 28.

=== Louisville Kings ===
On January 12, 2026, Payton was allocated to the Louisville Kings of the United Football League (UFL).

=== Houston Gamblers ===
On May 4, 2026, Payton was traded by Louisville to the Houston Gamblers in exchange for Lonnie Phelps.
