= Ramiz Ahmed =

American football player (born 1995)

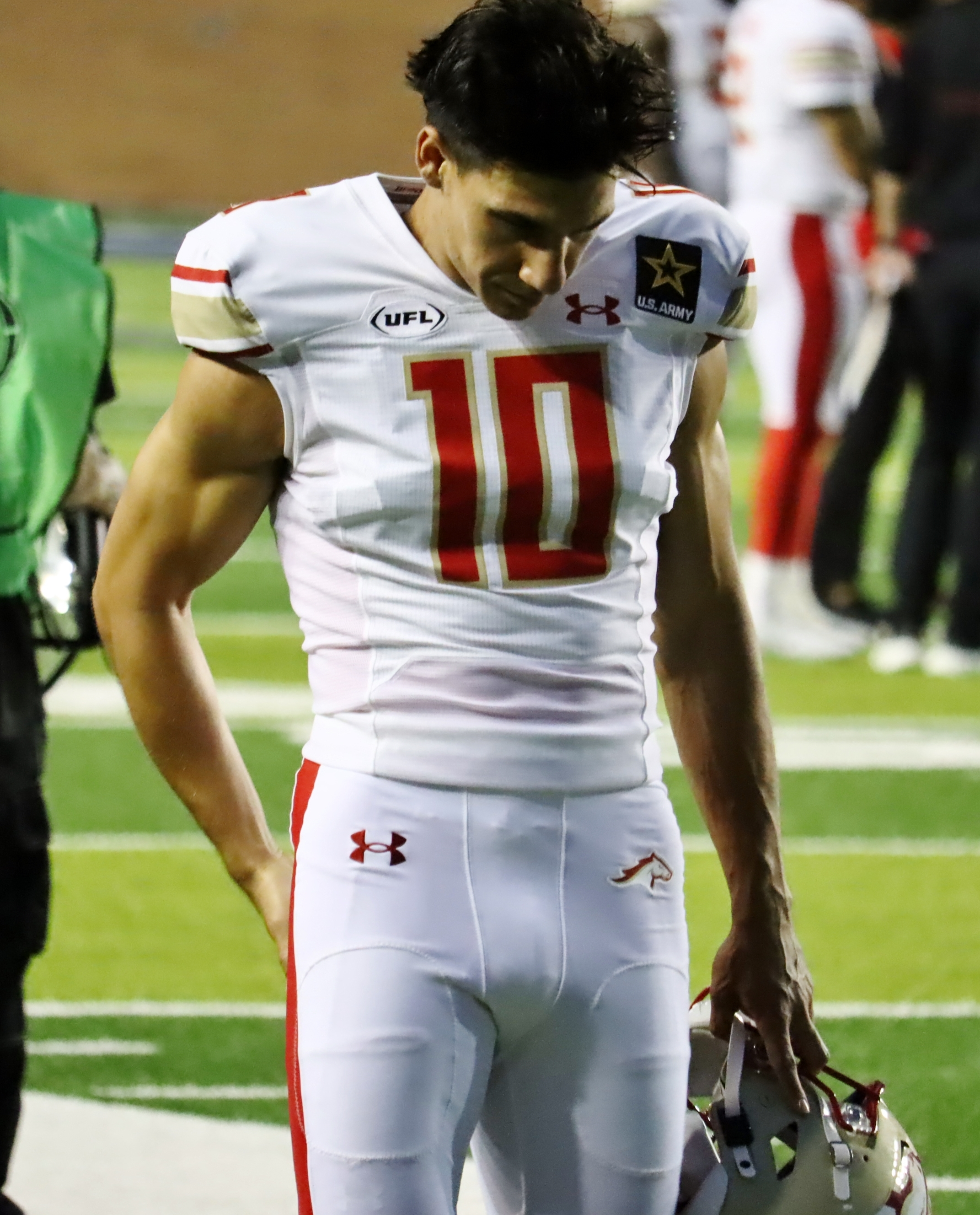
- Ahmed with the Birmingham Stallions in 2024

No. 20 – St. Louis Battlehawks
- Position: Kicker
- Roster status: Active

Personal information
- Born: July 27, 1995 (age 31); Las Vegas, Nevada, U.S.
- Listed height: 5 ft 11 in (1.80 m)
- Listed weight: 195 lb (88 kg)

Career information
- High school: Bishop Gorman (Las Vegas)
- College: Nevada (2017–2018)
- NFL draft: 2019: undrafted

Career history
- Chicago Bears (2020)*; Pittsburgh Maulers (2022); Green Bay Packers (2022); Birmingham Stallions (2024); Washington Commanders (2024)*; St. Louis Battlehawks (2026–present)
- * Offseason or practice squad member only
- Stats at Pro Football Reference

Ramiz Ahmed (born July 27, 1995) is an American football kicker for the St. Louis Battlehawks of the United Football League (UFL). He played college football for the Nevada Wolf Pack and holds the record for the longest field goal in USFL history at 61 yards. Ahmed has also been a member of the Chicago Bears, Green Bay Packers, and Washington Commanders of the National Football League (NFL).

== Early life ==
A Las Vegas native, Ahmed originally attended Faith Lutheran High School, where he played on the varsity soccer team as a freshman. He did not play football until his second year, when he transferred to Bishop Gorman High School and joined their team as a kicker. Ahmed was the starter on the 2013 state championship team, making 6-of-11 field goals, 71-of-74 PATs and hitting 67 touchbacks in 93 attempts.

== College career ==
Ahmed first attended the University of Nevada, Las Vegas (UNLV) before transferring to Arizona State University (ASU), though he did not play football at either school. Ahmed transferred again in January 2017, this time to the University of Nevada, Reno, where he made the Wolf Pack football team as a walk-on. Though he struggled with inconsistency on field goals, Ahmed's powerful right leg caught the team's attention at a student tryout conducted six days before the season opener. "He came out just banging the ball, just destroying it," said special teams coordinator Tommy Perry, who compared his kicks to "a shotgun going off." By this time he was a junior, Ahmed had to wait a few weeks to get cleared before making his college debut as the Wolf Pack's starting kickoff specialist in their second game against Toledo. He recorded three touchbacks in three attempts and was named the team's special teams player of the week for his performance. In total, Ahmed had 28 touchbacks in 55 attempts and earned academic all-conference honors in his first season.

During his senior year, Ahmed became the starting kicker. He made 15 of 20 field goals and 40 of 44 PATs.

== Professional career ==
Pre-draft measurables
Height	Weight	Arm length	Hand span	Wingspan
5 ft 11 1/4 in (1.81 m)	182 lb (83 kg)	29 7/8 in (0.76 m)	9 1/2 in (0.24 m)	6 ft 0 1/4 in (1.84 m)
All values from Pro Day

=== Chicago Bears ===
On April 17, 2020, he signed with the Chicago Bears as competition for Eddy Piñeiro. On August 11, Ahmed was waived, making Piñeiro the Bears' kicker for the 2020 season.

=== Pittsburgh Maulers ===
On March 10, 2022, Ahmed was drafted by the Pittsburgh Maulers of the United States Football League in the seventh round of the 2022 USFL supplemental draft.

In Week 8, Ahmed made a 61-yard field goal against the New Jersey Generals, marking as the longest field goal in USFL history.

=== Green Bay Packers ===
On August 14, 2022, Ahmed signed with the Green Bay Packers. He was waived on August 30, 2022. He was signed to the practice squad on September 5, 2022. On November 12, 2022, he was elevated to the active roster for the game against the Dallas Cowboys. He handled kickoffs as starter Mason Crosby dealt with a sore back, kicking off six times, three of which went for touchbacks. On November 14, 2022, Ahmed was reverted to the Packers practice squad. On December 31, 2022, Ahmed was elevated to the active roster from the practice squad. During warm-ups for the team's week seventeen game against the Minnesota Vikings Ahmed suffered a groin injury and did not play during the game despite being elevated to once again handle kickoff duties. After the game on January 2, 2023, Ahmed returned to the team's practice squad while the team signed fellow kicker Matt Ammendola. On January 16, 2023, Ahmed's contract with the team expired.

=== Birmingham Stallions ===
On April 16, 2024, Ahmed signed with the Birmingham Stallions of the United Football League (UFL). He was released on May 28.

=== Washington Commanders ===
Ahmed signed with the Washington Commanders on June 4, 2024. He was released by Washington on August 13.

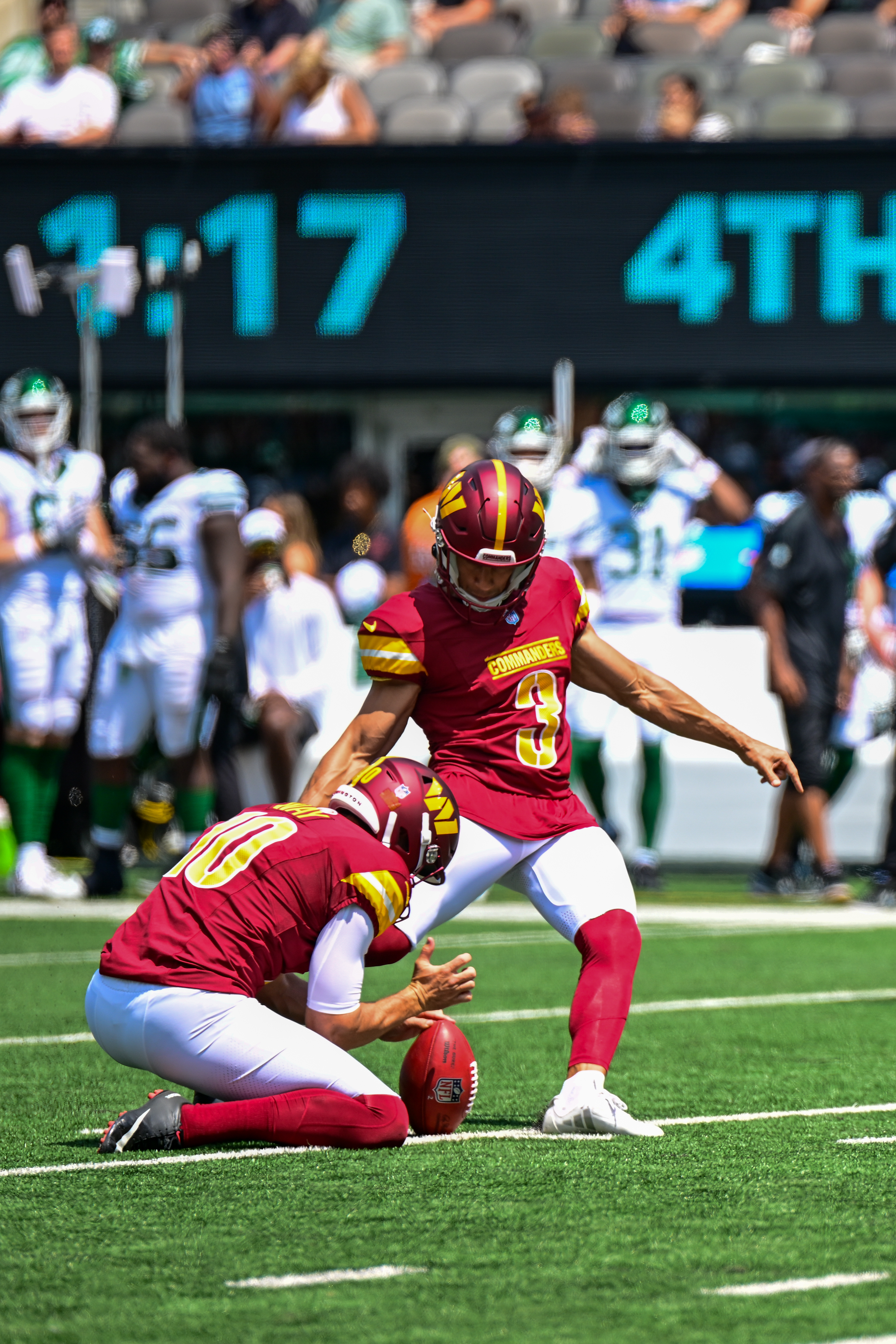
Ahmed in 2024

=== St. Louis Battlehawks ===
On April 28, 2026, Ahmed signed with the St. Louis Battlehawks of the United Football League (UFL).
