= 2026 Orlando Storm season =

American professional football season

- Owner: Alpha Acquico, LLC
- Head coach: Anthony Becht
- Home stadium: Inter.co Stadium

Results
- Record: 8–2
- Conference place: 1st in UFL
- Playoffs: Lost Semifinals (Defenders) 22–28

Uniform
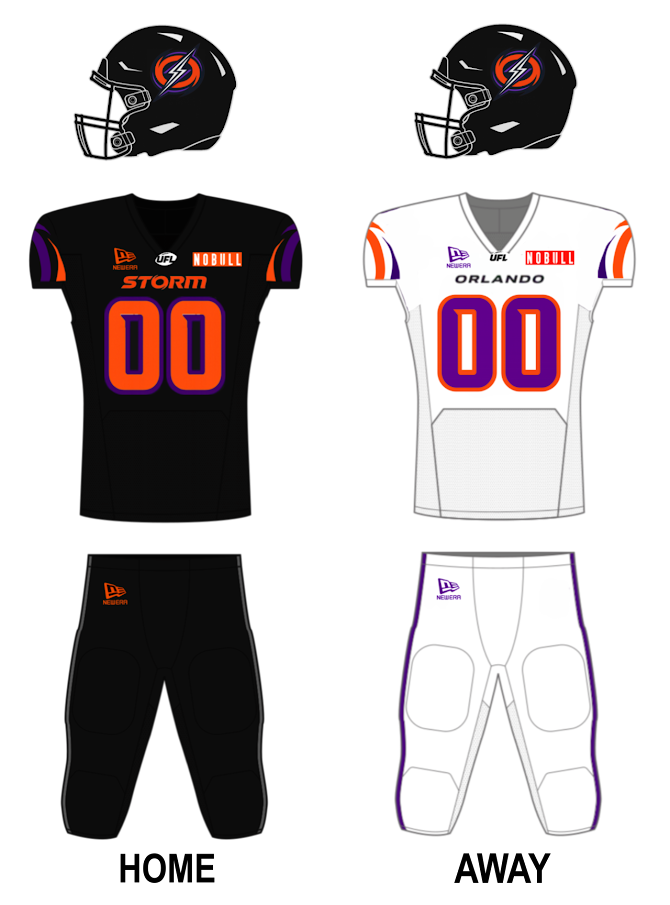

The 2026 Orlando Storm season was the inaugural season for the Orlando Storm. They are members of the United Football League (UFL) and played their games at Inter&Co Stadium. They were led by head coach Anthony Becht. On May 15, 2026, they were the first UFL team to clinch a playoff berth following their victory over the Dallas Renegades in the "Hats Off To Heroes" game in Fort Hood, Texas.

== Offseason ==
=== Coaching changes ===
On December 23, 2025, Anthony Becht was named the team's inaugural head coach. On February 23, 2026, the Storm announced their full 2026 coaching staff.

=== Draft ===
Teams were allowed to protect up to 12 players from their 2025 rosters. Following this process, the Orlando Storm were allocated players from the roster of the defunct San Antonio Brahmas.

=== Staff ===
Orlando Storm staff
Head coach: Head coach – Anthony Becht; Offensive coaches: Co-offensive coordinator – Marc Colombo; Co-offensive coordinator – Colin Thompson; Quarterbacks – Jordan Kitna; Running backs – Art Valero	Defensive coaches: Defensive coordinator – Donnie Abraham; Defensive line – La'Roi Glover; Linebackers – Mike Phair; Special teams – Martin Bayless

== Final roster ==
2026 Orlando Storm final roster
Quarterbacks: 16 Hank Bachmeier; 1 Matt Corral; 13 Jack Plummer; Running backs: 6 Jashaun Corbin; 33 Elijah Dotson; 29 Tre Stewart; 42 Deuce Vaughn; Wide receivers: 2 Elijhah Badger; 16 Cam Camper; 84 Aron Cruickshank; 3 K. J. Hamler; 85 Jerome Kapp; 12 Chris Rowland; 82 Sam Wiglusz; Tight ends: 87 Shawn Bowman; 86 Steven Stilianos	Offensive linemen: 54 Bryce Benhart T; 75 Mike Edwards G; 76 Joey Fisher G; 67 Michael Gonzalez G; 68 Zuri Henry T; 77 Jason Ivey T; 73 Samuel Jackson T; 56 Cole Schneider C; 51 Mose Vavao C/G; Defensive linemen: 52 Keshawn Banks DE; 95 Amani Bledsoe DT; 96 Isaiah Buggs DT; 17 Chris Collins DE; 30 Jasheen Davis DE; 48 Chris Garrett DE; 90 Fabien Lovett DT; 97 Isaiah Mack DT; 0 Pheldarius Payne DT	Linebackers: 58 Darien Butler ILB; 55 DeQuan Jackson ILB; 9 Deion Jennings ILB; 43 Kana'i Mauga ILB; Defensive backs: 26 Nate Brooks CB; 27 Chris Claybrooks CB; 14 D. J. James CB; 22 Nate Meadors S; 15 Josh Minkins Jr. S; 20 Mishael Powell S; 38 Brandon Sebastian CB; 25 Jason Taylor II S; 21 Avery Young S; Special teams: 5 Jack Browning P; 7 Michael Lantz K; 47 Alex Matheson LS	Reserve lists: 11 Tavante Beckett LB (IR); 81 Konner Fox TE (IR); 8 Mark Gilbert CB (IR); 21 Lamar Jackson CB (IR); 24 Jaylen Mahoney S (IR); -- Grayson Murphy DE Retired; 40 Andrew Parker Jr. ILB (IR); -- Teton Saltes T Retired; -- Lawrance Toafili RB Retired; 98 Willie Yarbary DT (IR); 50 active, 10 inactive

== Schedule ==
All times Eastern

Week	Day	Date	Kickoff	TV	Opponent	Results		Location	Attendance
Week	Day	Date	Kickoff	TV	Opponent	Score	Record	Location	Attendance
1	Sunday	March 29	8:00 p.m.	ESPN	Columbus Aviators	W 23–16	1–0	Inter&Co Stadium	11,127
2	Saturday	April 4	8:00 p.m.	ESPN	Louisville Kings	W 19–9	2–0	Inter&Co Stadium	8,585
3	Friday	April 10	8:00 p.m.	Fox	at Louisville Kings	W 29–27 (OT)	3–0	Lynn Family Stadium	11,082
4	Saturday	April 18	4:00 p.m.	Fox	at Birmingham Stallions	W 16–0	4–0	Protective Stadium	18,340
5	Saturday	April 25	7:00 p.m.	ESPN	St. Louis Battlehawks	L 17–25	4–1	Inter&Co Stadium	9,735
6	Sunday	May 3	4:00 p.m.	Fox	Birmingham Stallions	L 17–20	4–2	Inter&Co Stadium	9,107
7	Sunday	May 10	6:00 p.m.	FS1	at Houston Gamblers	W 24–23	5–2	Shell Energy Stadium	4,409
8	Friday	May 15	8:00 p.m.	Fox	at Dallas Renegades	W 31–24	6–2	Phantom Warrior Stadium	4,001
9	Friday	May 22	8:00 p.m.	Fox	DC Defenders	W 27–19	7–2	Inter&Co Stadium	10,594
10	Sunday	May 31	12:00 p.m.	ABC	at DC Defenders	W 29–23	8–2	Audi Field	9,924

=== Game summaries ===
==== Week 1: vs. Columbus Aviators ====
Week 1: Columbus Aviators at Orlando Storm – Game summary

Quarter	1	2	3	4	Total
Aviators	6	0	0	10	16
Storm	6	3	14	0	23

at Inter&Co Stadium • Orlando, Florida

- Date: March 29
- Game time: 8:00 p.m. EDT
- Game weather: Partly cloudy, 69 °F (21 °C)
- Game attendance: 11,127
- Referee: Bryan Banks
- TV announcers (ESPN): Joe Tessitore, Jordan Rodgers, Sam Acho and Tom Luginbill
- Game Book

Game information

First quarter

- ORL – Jashaun Corbin 21-yard run (Michael Lantz kick), 13:47. Storm 6–0. Drive: 3 plays • 34 yards • 1:04
- CLB – Ryan Coe 35-yard field goal, 9:08. Storm 6–3. Drive: 9 plays • 40 yards • 4:39
- CLB – Ryan Coe 37-yard field goal, 1:52. Tied 6–6. Drive: 7 plays • 32 yards • 3:54

Second quarter

- ORL – Michael Lantz 55-yard field goal, 0:00. Storm 9–6. Drive: 12 plays • 56 yards • 2:41

Third quarter

- ORL – Jashaun Corbin 13-yard run (Michael Lantz kick), 11:02. Storm 16–6. Drive: 7 plays • 75 yards • 3:58
- ORL – Chris Rowland 9-yard pass from Jack Plummer (Michael Lantz kick), 4:39. Storm 23–6. Drive: 8 plays • 109 yards • 4:08

Fourth quarter

- CLB – Ryan Coe 33-yard field goal, 14:55. Storm 23–9. Drive: 9 plays • 50 yards • 4:44
- CLB – ZaQuandre White 3-yard run (Ryan Coe kick), 5:29. Storm 23–16. Drive: 13 plays • 75 yards • 7:21

Top passers

- CLB – Jalan McClendon – 21/32, 212 yards
- ORL – Jack Plummer – 17/22, 245 yards, TD

Top rushers

- CLB – ZaQuandre White – 3 rushes, 48 yards, TD
- ORL – Jashaun Corbin – 15 rushes, 66 yards, 2 TD

Top receivers

- CLB – Tay Martin – 7 receptions, 86 yards
- ORL – Elijhah Badger – 4 receptions, 132 yards

==== Week 2: vs. Louisville Kings ====
Week 2: Louisville Kings at Orlando Storm – Game summary

Quarter	1	2	3	4	Total
Kings	3	6	0	0	9
Storm	3	9	0	7	19

at Inter&Co Stadium • Orlando, Florida

- Date: April 4
- Game time: 8:00 p.m. EDT
- Game weather: Clear, 79 °F (26 °C)
- Game attendance: 8,585
- Referee: Chris Coyte
- TV announcers (ESPN): Joe Tessitore, Jordan Rodgers, Sam Acho and Tom Luginbill
- Game Book

Game information

First quarter

- LOU – Tanner Brown 42-yard field goal, 7:43. Kings 3–0. Drive: 5 plays • 28 yards • 2:05
- ORL – Michael Lantz 57-yard field goal, 5:10. Tied 3–3. Drive: 6 plays • 15 yards • 2:33.

Second quarter

- LOU – Tanner Brown 41-yard field goal, 15:00. Kings 6–3. Drive: 10 plays • 65 yards • 5:10
- ORL – Michael Lantz 41-yard field goal, 8:54. Tied 6–6. Drive: 11 plays • 53 yards • 6:06.
- LOU – Tanner Brown 26-yard field goal, 2:00. Kings 9–6. Drive: 11 plays • 63 yards • 6:53
- ORL – K. J. Hamler 41-yard pass from Jack Plummer (kick failed), 0:38. Storm 12–9. Drive: 6 plays • 60 yards • 1:32

Third quarter

- No scoring plays

Fourth quarter

- ORL – Elijhah Badger 39-yard pass from Jack Plummer (Jonathan Garibay kick), 5:12. Storm 19–9. Drive: 8 plays • 75 yards • 3:54

Top passers

- LOU – Chandler Rogers – 13/20, 151 yards, INT
- ORL – Jack Plummer – 18/23, 182 yards, 2 TD, INT

Top rushers

- LOU – Chandler Rogers – 1 rush, 12 yards
- ORL – Jashaun Corbin – 19 rushes, 51 yards

Top receivers

- LOU – Tre' McKitty – 2 receptions, 39 yards
- ORL – K. J. Hamler – 2 receptions, 59 yards, TD
- ORL – Elijhah Badger – 4 receptions, 59 yards, TD

==== Week 3: at Louisville Kings ====
Week 3: Orlando Storm at Louisville Kings – Game summary

Quarter	1	2	3	4	OT	Total
Storm	0	10	7	10	2	29
Kings	3	3	14	7	0	27

at Lynn Family Stadium • Louisville, Kentucky

- Date: April 10
- Game time: 8:00 p.m. EDT
- Game weather: Light rain, 67 °F (19 °C)
- Game attendance: 11,082
- Referee: Adam Savoie
- TV announcers (Fox): Curt Menefee, Devin Gardner and Jake Butt
- Game Book

Game information

First quarter

- LOU – Tanner Brown 51-yard field goal, 2:38. Kings 3–0. Drive: 9 plays • 42 yards • 4:31

Second quarter

- ORL – Chris Rowland 8-yard pass from Jack Plummer (Michael Lantz kick), 14:22. Storm 7–3. Drive: 7 plays • 60 yards • 3:16
- LOU – Tanner Brown 27-yard field goal, 5:17. Storm 7–6. Drive: 7 plays • 76 yards • 3:42
- ORL – Michael Lantz 44-yard field goal, 1:39. Storm 9–6. Drive: 6 plays • 21 yards • 3:38

Third quarter

- LOU – Zach Davidson 23-yard pass from Jason Bean (Tanner Brown kick), 13:25. Kings 13–10. Drive: 3 plays • 61 yards • 1:30
- ORL – Jashaun Corbin 20-yard pass from Jack Plummer (Michael Lantz kick), 8:47. Storm 17–13. Drive: 8 plays • 66 yards • 4:43
- LOU – Lucky Jackson 13-yard pass from Jason Bean (Tanner Brown kick), 5:08. Kings 20–17. Drive: 7 plays • 56 yards • 3:39

Fourth quarter

- ORL – Michael Lantz 40-yard field goal, 14:56. Tied 20–20. Drive: 9 plays • 28 yards • 5:12
- ORL – K. J. Hamler 40-yard pass from Jack Plummer (Michael Lantz kick), 11:53. Storm 27–20. Drive: 3 plays • 47 yards • 1:25
- LOU – Zach Davidson 6-yard pass from Jason Bean (Tanner Brown kick), 1:06. Tied 27–27. Drive: 12 plays • 66 yards • 4:12

Overtime

- ORL – Sudden-death conversion good; 2nd consecutive LOU penalty. Storm 29–27.

Top passers

- ORL – Jack Plummer – 21/34, 250 yards, 3 TD
- LOU – Jason Bean – 23/46, 352 yards, 3 TD

Top rushers

- ORL – Tre Stewart – 8 rushes, 35 yards
- LOU – Benny Snell – 12 rushes, 50 yards

Top receivers

- ORL – Chris Rowland – 9 receptions, 113 yards, TD
- LOU – Isaiah Winstead – 7 receptions, 114 yards

==== Week 4: at Birmingham Stallions ====
Week 4: Orlando Storm at Birmingham Stallions – Game summary

Quarter	1	2	3	4	Total
Storm	7	6	0	3	16
Stallions	0	0	0	0	0

at Protective Stadium • Birmingham, Alabama

- Date: April 18
- Game time: 4:00 p.m. EDT
- Game weather: Partly cloudy, 82 °F (28 °C)
- Game attendance: 18,340
- Referee: Francisco Villar
- TV announcers (Fox): Kevin Kugler, Devin Gardner and Jenny Taft
- Game Book

Game information

First quarter

- ORL – Cam Camper 13-yard pass from Jack Plummer (Michael Lantz kick), 1:59. Storm 7–0. Drive: 9 plays • 72 yards • 5:24

Second quarter

- ORL – Michael Lantz 26-yard field goal, 7:33. Storm 10–0. Drive: 9 plays • 61 yards • 4:49
- ORL – Michael Lantz 46-yard field goal, 0:02. Storm 13–0. Drive: 6 plays • 41 yards • 0:28

Third quarter

- No scoring plays

Fourth quarter

- ORL – Michael Lantz 45-yard field goal, 12:18. Storm 16–0. Drive: 9 plays • 33 yards • 5:03

Top passers

- ORL – Jack Plummer – 17/27, 275 yards, TD
- BIR – Matt Corral – 13/20, 83 yards

Top rushers

- ORL – Jashaun Corbin – 18 rushes, 58 yards
- BIR – Anthony McFarland Jr. – 8 rushes, 30 yards

Top receivers

- ORL – Cam Camper – 4 receptions, 44 yards, TD
- BIR – Jaydon Mickens – 4 receptions, 35 yards

==== Week 5: vs. St. Louis Battlehawks ====
Week 5: St. Louis Battlehawks at Orlando Storm – Game summary

Quarter	1	2	3	4	Total
Battlehawks	6	12	7	0	25
Storm	0	0	14	3	17

at Inter&Co Stadium • Orlando, Florida

- Date: April 25
- Game time: 7:00 p.m. EDT
- Game weather: Partly cloudy, 74 °F (23 °C)
- Game attendance: 9,735
- Referee: Bryan Banks
- TV announcers (ESPN): Lowell Galindo, Kirk Morrison, Eric Mac Lain and Max Browne
- Game Book

Game information

First quarter

- STL – Kylin James 2-yard run (kick failed), 11:03. Battlehawks 6–0. Drive: 8 plays • 67 yards • 3:57

Second quarter

- STL – James Bostic III 10-yard pass from Harrison Frost (kick failed), 12:02. Battlehawks 12–0. Drive: 11 plays • 59 yards • 4:58
- STL – Ryan Sanborn 36-yard field goal, 3:46. Battlehawks 15–0. Drive: 9 plays • 63 yards • 4:51
- STL – Ryan Sanborn 40-yard field goal, 0:04. Battlehawks 18–0. Drive: 6 plays • 29 yards • 0:48

Third quarter

- STL – Harrison Frost 2-yard run (Ryan Sanborn kick), 11:52. Battlehawks 25–0. Drive: 4 plays • 41 yards • 1:30
- ORL – Elijhah Badger 4-yard pass from Jack Plummer (Michael Lantz kick), 7:17. Battlehawks 25–7. Drive: 11 plays • 59 yards • 4:58
- ORL – Elijah Dotson 1-yard run (Michael Lantz kick), 5:23. Battlehawks 25–14. Drive: 1 plays • 1 yards • 0:03

Fourth quarter

- ORL – Michael Lantz 32-yard field goal, 1:52. Battlehawks 25–17. Drive: 16 plays • 69 yards • 7:02

Top passers

- STL – Harrison Frost – 20/31, 185 yards, TD, 2 INT
- ORL – Jack Plummer – 24/44, 143 yards, TD

Top rushers

- STL – Jarveon Howard – 17 rushes, 57 yards, TD
- ORL – Jashaun Corbin – 11 rushes, 45 yards

Top receivers

- STL – Steven McBride – 4 receptions, 53 yards
- ORL – Cam Camper – 6 receptions, 34 yards

==== Week 6: vs. Birmingham Stallions ====
Week 6: Birmingham Stallions at Orlando Storm – Game summary

Quarter	1	2	3	4	Total
Stallions	14	3	0	3	20
Storm	7	7	0	3	17

at Inter&Co Stadium • Orlando, Florida

- Date: May 3
- Game time: 4:00 p.m. EDT
- Game weather: Partly cloudy, 78 °F (26 °C)
- Game attendance: 9,107
- Referee: Michael Vandervelde
- TV announcers (Fox): Kevin Kugler, Joel Klatt and Jake Butt
- Game Book

Game information

First quarter

- BIR – Snoop Conner 11-yard run (Anders Carlson kick), 10:27. Stallions 7–0. Drive: 3 plays • 74 yards • 1:23
- BIR – Justyn Ross 13-yard pass from Dorian Thompson-Robinson (Anders Carlson kick), 4:13. Stallions 14–0. Drive: 5 plays • 36 yards • 2:19
- ORL – Chris Rowland 3-yard pass from Jack Plummer (Michael Lantz kick), 1:51. Stallions 14–7. Drive: 5 plays • 51 yards • 2:29

Second quarter

- ORL – K. J. Hamler 5-yard pass from Jack Plummer (Michael Lantz kick), 9:10. Tied 14–14. Drive: 9 plays • 63 yards • 5:15
- BIR – Anders Carlson 38-yard field goal, 3:04. Stallions 17–14. Drive: 11 plays • 59 yards • 6:06

Third quarter

- No scoring plays

Fourth quarter

- BIR – Anders Carlson 48-yard field goal, 13:39. Stallions 20–14. Drive: 7 plays • 17 yards • 3:41
- ORL – Michael Lantz 26-yard field goal, 7:33. Stallions 20–17. Drive: 8 plays • 49 yards • 4:05

Top passers

- BIR – Dorian Thompson-Robinson – 19/27, 271 yards, TD
- ORL – Jack Plummer – 26/37, 324 yards, 2 TD

Top rushers

- BIR – Snoop Conner – 16 rushes, 61 yards, TD
- ORL – Jashaun Corbin – 13 rushes, 53 yards

Top receivers

- BIR – Justyn Ross – 7 receptions, 135 yards, TD
- ORL – K. J. Hamler – 8 receptions, 113 yards, TD

==== Week 7: at Houston Gamblers ====
Week 7: Orlando Storm at Houston Gamblers – Game summary

Quarter	1	2	3	4	Total
Storm	7	10	0	7	24
Gamblers	3	10	7	3	23

at Shell Energy Stadium • Houston, Texas

- Date: May 10
- Game time: 6:00 p.m. EDT
- Game weather: Partly cloudy, 86 °F (30 °C)
- Game attendance: 4,409
- Referee: Michael Vandervelde
- TV announcers (FS1): Kevin Kugler, Devin Gardner and Jake Butt
- Game Book

Game information

First quarter

- ORL – Elijhah Badger 35-yard pass from Jack Plummer (Michael Lantz kick), 6:43. Storm 7–0. Drive: 3 plays • 50 yards • 1:16
- HOU – John Hoyland 23-yard field goal, 1:28. Storm 7–3. Drive: 12 plays • 67 yards • 5:15

Second quarter

- ORL – D. J. James 18-yard interception return (Michael Lantz kick), 14:06. Storm 14–3.
- HOU – Hunter Dekkers 6-yard run (John Hoyland kick), 11:28. Storm 14–10. Drive: 6 plays • 44 yards • 2:38
- ORL – Michael Lantz 45-yard field goal, 7:47. Storm 17–10. Drive: 11 plays • 81 yards • 3:41
- HOU – John Hoyland 23-yard field goal, 0:03. Storm 17–13. Drive: 10 plays • 54 yards • 1:46

Third quarter

- HOU – Jalen White 49-yard pass from John Rhys Plumlee (Michael Lantz kick), 4:05. Gamblers 20–17. Drive: 6 plays • 64 yards • 3:16

Fourth quarter

- ORL – Elijhah Badger 31-yard pass from Jack Plummer (Michael Lantz kick), 14:53. Storm 24–20. Drive: 8 plays • 79 yards • 4:12
- HOU – John Hoyland 31-yard field goal, 12:08. Storm 24–23. Drive: 6 plays • 18 yards • 2:45

Top passers

- ORL – Jack Plummer – 14/24, 152 yards, 2 TD
- HOU – Hunter Dekkers – 24/41, 268 yards, INT

Top rushers

- ORL – Jashaun Corbin – 7 rushes, 25 yards
- HOU – Marcus Majors Jr. – 6 rushes, 32 yards

Top receivers

- ORL – Elijhah Badger – 4 receptions, 75 yards, 2 TD
- HOU – Jalen Moreno-Cropper – 6 receptions, 68 yards

==== Week 8: at Dallas Renegades ====
Week 8: Orlando Storm at Dallas Renegades – Game summary

Quarter	1	2	3	4	Total
Storm	0	10	14	7	31
Renegades	3	7	7	7	24

at Phantom Warrior Stadium • Fort Hood, Texas

- Date: May 15
- Game time: 8:00 p.m. EDT
- Game weather: Sunny, 83 °F (28 °C)
- Game attendance: 4,001
- Referee: Chris Coyte
- TV announcers (Fox): Curt Menefee, Joel Klatt, Jenny Taft and Jake Butt
- Game Book

Game information

First quarter

- DAL – Colton Theaker 31-yard field goal, 4:23. Renegades 3–0. Drive: 10 plays • 46 yards • 5:12

Second quarter

- DAL – Emmanuel Butler 3-yard pass from Austin Reed (Colton Theaker kick), 11:06. Renegades 10–0. Drive: 9 plays • 58 yards • 4:43
- ORL – Michael Lantz 43-yard field goal, 6:25. Renegades 10–3. Drive: 8 plays • 40 yards • 4:41
- ORL – Jack Plummer 1-yard run (Michael Lantz kick), 0:14. Tied 10–10. Drive: 10 plays • 50 yards • 4:05

Third quarter

- ORL – Jack Plummer 71-yard run (Michael Lantz kick), 13:27. Storm 17–10. Drive: 3 plays • 80 yards • 1:33
- DAL – Seth Green 36-yard pass from Austin Reed (Colton Theaker kick), 9:50. Tied 17–17. Drive: 6 plays • 62 yards • 3:37
- ORL – Jashaun Corbin 2-yard run (Michael Lantz kick), 3:12. Storm 24–17. Drive: 12 plays • 69 yards • 6:38

Fourth quarter

- ORL – K. J. Hamler 7-yard run (Michael Lantz kick), 10:36. Storm 31–17. Drive: 6 plays • 35 yards • 3:06
- DAL – Emmanuel Butler 9-yard pass from Austin Reed (Colton Theaker kick), 11:06. Storm 31–24. Drive: 10 plays • 70 yards • 5:05

Top passers

- ORL – Jack Plummer – 24/36, 238 yards
- DAL – Austin Reed – 12/23, 134 yards, 3 TD, INT

Top rushers

- ORL – Jack Plummer – 4 rushes, 70 yards, 2 TD
- DAL – Ellis Merriweather – 12 rushes, 76 yards

Top receivers

- ORL – Chris Rowland – 9 receptions, 91 yards
- DAL – Emmanuel Butler – 3 receptions, 21 yards, 2 TD

==== Week 9: vs. DC Defenders ====
Week 9: DC Defenders at Orlando Storm – Game summary

Quarter	1	2	3	4	Total
Defenders	10	0	3	6	19
Storm	7	14	3	3	27

at Inter&Co Stadium • Orlando, Florida

- Date: May 22
- Game time: 8:00 p.m. EDT
- Game weather: Sunny, 85 °F (29 °C)
- Game attendance: 10,594
- Referee: Adam Savoie
- TV announcers (Fox): Curt Menefee, Devin Gardner and Jenny Taft
- Game Book

Game information

First quarter

- ORL – Chris Rowland 62-yard pass from Jack Plummer (Michael Lantz kick), 11:24. Storm 7–0. Drive: 6 plays • 77 yards • 3:36
- DC – Matt McCrane 43-yard field goal, 7:04. Storm 7–3. Drive: 8 plays • 46 yards • 4:20
- DC – Deon Jackson 3-yard run (Matt McCrane kick), 0:51. Defenders 10–7. Drive: 4 plays • 59 yards • 1:41

Second quarter

- ORL – Elijhah Badger 41-yard pass from Jack Plummer (Michael Lantz kick), 14:30. Storm 14–10. Drive: 4 plays • 60 yards • 1:21
- ORL – Cam Camper 2-yard pass from Jack Plummer (Michael Lantz kick), 3:17. Storm 21–10. Drive: 9 plays • 63 yards • 5:15

Third quarter

- DC – Matt McCrane 56-yard field goal, 8:35. Storm 21–13. Drive: 9 plays • 37 yards • 6:25
- ORL – Michael Lantz 35-yard field goal, 3:24. Storm 24–13. Drive: 9 plays • 38 yards • 5:11

Fourth quarter

- DC – Matt McCrane 28-yard field goal, 8:28. Storm 24–16. Drive: 10 plays • 67 yards • 5:00
- DC – Matt McCrane 42-yard field goal, 1:36. Storm 24–19. Drive: 9 plays • 44 yards • 2:26
- ORL – Michael Lantz 51-yard field goal, 0:25. Storm 27–19. Drive: 4 plays • -5 yards • 1:05

Top passers

- DC – Spencer Sanders – 10/21, 160 yards
- ORL – Jack Plummer – 21/27, 275 yards, 3 TD

Top rushers

- DC – Spencer Sanders – 8 rushes, 75 yards
- ORL – Jashaun Corbin – 16 rushes, 52 yards

Top receivers

- DC – Cornell Powell – 4 receptions, 40 yards
- ORL – Chris Rowland – 8 receptions, 117 yards, TD

==== Week 10: at DC Defenders ====
Week 10: Orlando Storm at DC Defenders – Game summary

Quarter	1	2	3	4	Total
Storm	7	3	7	12	29
Defenders	3	6	8	6	23

at Audi Field • Washington, D.C.

- Date: May 31
- Game time: 12:00 p.m. EDT
- Game weather: Sunny, 75 °F (24 °C)
- Game attendance: 9,924
- Referee: Kole Knueppel
- TV announcers (ABC): Matt Schumacker, Jordan Rodgers, Sam Acho and Tom Luginbill
- Game Book

Game information

First quarter

- DC – Matt McCrane 28-yard field goal, 7:53. Defenders 3–0. Drive: 8 plays • 37 yards • 3:36
- ORL – Mishael Powell 93-yard interception return (Michael Lantz kick), 1:33. Storm 7–3.

Second quarter

- DC – Matt McCrane 38-yard field goal, 11:44. Storm 7–6. Drive: 11 plays • 56 yards • 4:49
- ORL – Michael Lantz 35-yard field goal, 0:19. Storm 10–6. Drive: 11 plays • 50 yards • 4:43
- DC – Matt McCrane 29-yard field goal, 0:00. Storm 10–9. Drive: 2 plays • 30 yards • 0:19

Third quarter

- ORL – Chris Rowland 31-yard pass from Jack Plummer (Michael Lantz kick), 11:31. Storm 17–9. Drive: 6 plays • 54 yards • 3:29
- DC – Xazavian Valladay 12-yard run (Deon Jackson two-point run), 0:57. Tied 17–17. Drive: 7 plays • 83 yards • 3:33

Fourth quarter

- ORL – Blocked punt out of bounds in the end zone for a safety, 11:38. Storm 19–17.
- ORL – Cam Camper 74-yard pass from Jack Plummer (Michael Lantz kick), 10:01. Storm 26–17. Drive: 3 plays • 76 yards • 1:37
- ORL – Michael Lantz 49-yard field goal, 8:00. Storm 29–17. Drive: 4 plays • 4 yards • 1:53
- DC – Briley Moore 16-yard pass from Jason Bean, 0:00. Storm 29–23. Drive: 4 plays • 46 yards • 0:40

Top passers

- ORL – Jack Plummer – 13/26, 203 yards, 2 TD
- DC – Jason Bean – 13/28, 165 yards, TD, 2 INT

Top rushers

- ORL – Jashaun Corbin – 12 rushes, 33 yards
- DC – Jason Bean – 11 rushes, 116 yards

Top receivers

- ORL – Chris Rowland – 4 receptions, 46 yards, TD
- DC – Cornell Powell – 5 receptions, 70 yards

== Standings ==
2026 UFL standings
Team	W	L	PCT	GB	TD+/-	TD+	TD-	PF	PA	DIFF	STK
(y) Orlando Storm	8	2	.800	–	9	26	17	232	186	46	W4
(x) St. Louis Battlehawks	6	4	.600	2	-2	21	23	212	197	15	L1
(x) Louisville Kings	6	4	.600	2	1	27	26	265	219	46	W4
(x) DC Defenders	5	5	.500	3	6	31	25	281	224	57	L4
(e) Dallas Renegades	4	6	.400	4	2	30	28	224	259	-35	W1
(e) Birmingham Stallions	4	6	.400	4	-1	24	25	190	229	-39	L2
(e) Houston Gamblers	4	6	.400	4	-6	20	26	189	236	-60	W1
(e) Columbus Aviators	3	7	.300	5	-6	27	33	216	259	-43	L1
(x)–clinched playoff berth; (y)–clinched conference; (e)–eliminated from playoff contention

== Postseason ==
All times Eastern

Week	Day	Date	Kickoff	TV	Opponent	Results		Location	Attendance
Week	Day	Date	Kickoff	TV	Opponent	Score	Record	Location	Attendance
Semifinals	Sunday	June 7	3:00 p.m.	ABC	DC Defenders	L 22–28	0–1	Daytona Stadium	6,317

=== UFL Semifinals: vs. DC Defenders ===
UFL Semifinals: DC Defenders at Orlando Storm – Game summary

Quarter	1	2	3	4	Total
Defenders	14	0	10	4	28
Storm	3	3	7	9	22

at Daytona Stadium • Daytona Beach, Florida

- Date: June 7
- Game time: 3:00 p.m. EDT
- Game weather: Partly cloudy, 83 °F (28 °C)
- Game attendance: 6,317
- Referee: Chris Coyte
- TV announcers (ABC): Joe Tessitore, Jordan Rodgers, Sam Acho and Tom Luginbill
- Game Book

Game information

First quarter

- DC – Deon Jackson 3-yard run (Matt McCrane kick), 9:13. Defenders 7–0. Drive: 11 plays • 55 yards • 5:47
- ORL – Michael Lantz 47-yard field goal, 6:49. Defenders 7–3. Drive: 5 plays • 11 yards • 2:24
- DC – Abram Smith 3-yard run (Matt McCrane kick), 2:29. Defenders 14–3. Drive: 8 plays • 65 yards • 4:20

Second quarter

- ORL – Michael Lantz 32-yard field goal, 13:51. Defenders 14–6. Drive: 7 plays • 49 yards • 3:38

Third quarter

- DC – Matt McCrane 32-yard field goal, 10:44. Defenders 17–6. Drive: 7 plays • 19 yards • 4:03
- ORL – Kana'i Mauga 59-yard interception return (Michael Lantz kick), 3:47. Defenders 17–13.
- DC – Briley Moore 33-yard pass from Jason Bean (Matt McCrane kick), 0:27. Defenders 24–13. Drive: 7 plays • 75 yards • 3:20

Fourth quarter

- ORL – Michael Lantz 23-yard field goal, 8:02. Defenders 24–16. Drive: 15 plays • 76 yards • 7:25
- DC – Matt McCrane 61-yard four-point field goal, 4:17. Defenders 28–16. Drive: 7 plays • 17 yards • 3:45
- ORL – Chris Rowland 40-yard pass from Jack Plummer (three-point pass failed), 3:02. Defenders 28–22. Drive: 4 plays • 79 yards • 1:15

Top passers

- DC – Jason Bean – 18/33, 233 yards, TD
- ORL – Jack Plummer – 15/28, 226 yards, TD, INT

Top rushers

- DC – Abram Smith – 11 rushes, 57 yards, TD
- ORL – Jashaun Corbin – 5 rushes, 24 yards

Top receivers

- DC – Keke Coutee – 4 receptions, 58 yards
- ORL – Chris Rowland – 6 receptions, 82 yards, TD
