= Shawn Bowman (American football) =

American football player (born 2000)

No. 44 – Arizona Cardinals
- Position: Tight end
- Roster status: Practice squad

Personal information
- Born: May 16, 2000 (age 26); Bear, Delaware, U.S.
- Listed height: 6 ft 4 in (1.93 m)
- Listed weight: 249 lb (113 kg)

Career information
- High school: Howard Tech (Wilmington, Delaware)
- College: Maine (2018–2022); Rutgers (2023)
- NFL draft: 2024: undrafted

Career history
- Jacksonville Jaguars (2024)*; Orlando Storm (2026); Arizona Cardinals (2026–present)
- * Offseason or practice squad member only
- Stats at Pro Football Reference

Shawn Bowman (born May 16, 2000) is an American professional football tight end for the Arizona Cardinals of the National Football League (NFL). He played college football for the Maine Black Bears and Rutgers Scarlet Knights. Bowman was signed by the Jacksonville Jaguars as an undrafted free agent in 2024. He has also been a member of the Orlando Storm of the United Football League (UFL).

== Early life ==
Bowman was born on May 16, 2000, in Bear, Delaware, where he grew up. He attended Howard High School of Technology in Wilmington, where he competed in football and basketball. He was three times selected All-Blue Hen Conference in basketball while, in football, he was second-team All-Blue Hen Conference in 2015 and first-team all-conference in 2016 and 2017. Bowman was named second-team all-state in football in 2016 and first-team all-state as a senior in 2017 as a defensive lineman. He committed to play college football for the Maine Black Bears, one of the few NCAA Division I teams to show interest in him, and there played tight end.

== College career ==
Bowman redshirted at Maine as a freshman in 2018. The following year, he made 11 appearances and recorded 22 receptions for 219 yards and a touchdown, being selected second-team Freshman All-American by Phil Steele. The 2020 season was postponed to the spring of 2021 due to the COVID-19 pandemic. In the spring 2021 season, he caught nine passes for 82 yards and a touchdown while starting each of the team's four games. Bowman then was named third-team All-Colonial Athletic Association in the fall 2021 season while catching 24 passes for 282 yards and four touchdowns. In 2022, he posted 31 receptions for 377 yards and five touchdowns, sitting out several games due to a leg injury.

A Maine team captain, Bowman concluded his stint with the Black Bears having caught 86 passes for 960 yards and 11 touchdowns. Following five years there, he decided to play a final season of college football in 2023 and transferred to the Rutgers Scarlet Knights. Mostly used as a blocker, he posted four catches for 24 yards in his only year with the Scarlet Knights while appearing in all 13 games, four as a starter.

== Professional career ==
=== Jacksonville Jaguars ===
After going unselected in the 2024 NFL draft, Bowman signed with the Jacksonville Jaguars as an undrafted free agent. He was waived on August 27, 2024, then re-signed to the practice squad the next day. After the season, Bowman signed a reserve/future contract with the Jaguars on January 6, 2025. Bowman was waived again by the Jaguars on August 26.

=== Orlando Storm ===
Bowman signed with the Orlando Storm of the United Football League (UFL) on January 26, 2026. He appeared in all 10 games for the Storm, starting six, while catching seven passes for 53 yards.

=== Arizona Cardinals ===
After the 2026 UFL season, Bowman returned to the NFL and signed with the Arizona Cardinals on August 9, 2026. He was waived by the Cardinals as a part of final roster cuts on August 30, then re-signed to the practice squad the next day. On October 14, Bowman was promoted to the active roster. He was waived on October 21, and re-signed to the practice squad.
