= Mishael Powell =

American football player (born 2001)

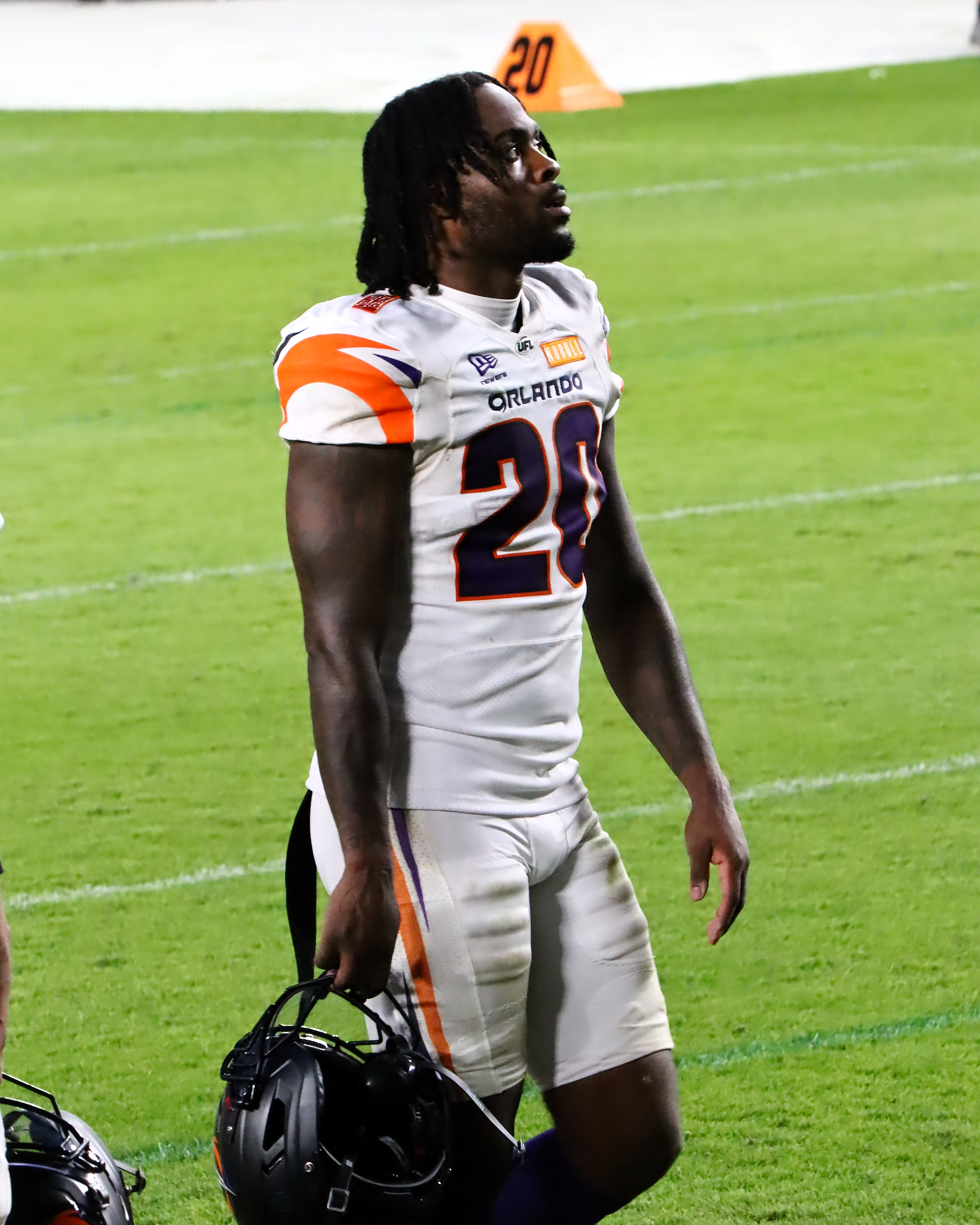
- Powell with the Orlando Storm in 2026

No. 20 – Orlando Storm
- Position: Safety
- Roster status: Active

Personal information
- Born: June 10, 2001 (age 25); Seattle, Washington, U.S.
- Listed height: 6 ft 1 in (1.85 m)
- Listed weight: 200 lb (91 kg)

Career information
- High school: O'Dea (Seattle, Washington)
- College: Washington (2019–2023); Miami (FL) (2024)
- NFL draft: 2025: undrafted

Career history
- Minnesota Vikings (2025)*; Orlando Storm (2026–present)
- * Offseason or practice squad member only

Awards and highlights
- Second-team All-ACC (2024)

Mishael Powell (born June 10, 2001) is an American professional football safety for the Orlando Storm of the United Football League (UFL). He played college football for the Washington Huskies and Miami Hurricanes.

== Early life ==
Powell attended O'Dea High School in Seattle, Washington. He received offers from Ivy League schools such as Columbia, Yale, and Georgetown, but Powell decided to walk on to play college football for the Washington Huskies.

== College career ==
=== Washington ===
After taking a redshirt in 2019, Powell did not appear in any games in 2020. In his first career start in 2021, he recorded six tackles and a forced fumble against the California Golden Bears. Powell finished his first season in 2021 with 11 tackles, three pass deflections, and a forced fumble. After the season, he was put on scholarship in early 2022. In 2022, Powell notched 43 tackles with one and a half being for a loss. He recorded his first career interception in week 3 of the 2023 season in a win over the Michigan State Spartans. In week 8, Powell returned an interception 89 yards for a touchdown as he helped the Huskies beat the Arizona State Sun Devils. For his performance, he was named the Pac-12 Conference defensive player of the week.

On January 12, 2024, Powell announced that he would be entering the NCAA transfer portal.

=== Miami (FL) ===
On January 17, 2024, Powell announced that he would be transferring to the University of Miami.

== Professional career ==
Pre-draft measurables
Height	Weight	Arm length	Hand span	Wingspan	40-yard dash	10-yard split	20-yard split	20-yard shuttle	Three-cone drill	Vertical jump	Broad jump	Bench press
6 ft 1 1/4 in (1.86 m)	200 lb (91 kg)	30 1/8 in (0.77 m)	8 1/2 in (0.22 m)	6 ft 2 7/8 in (1.90 m)	4.74 s	1.62 s	2.72 s	4.10 s	7.27 s	32.5 in (0.83 m)	10 ft 0 in (3.05 m)	13 reps
All values from Pro Day

=== Minnesota Vikings ===
Powell signed with the Minnesota Vikings as an undrafted free agent on April 26, 2025. He was waived on August 24.

=== Orlando Storm ===
On January 14, 2026, Powell was selected by the Orlando Storm in the 2026 UFL Draft.
