= Orlando Storm =

Football team in Orlando, Florida

- Current season
Logo	Wordmark
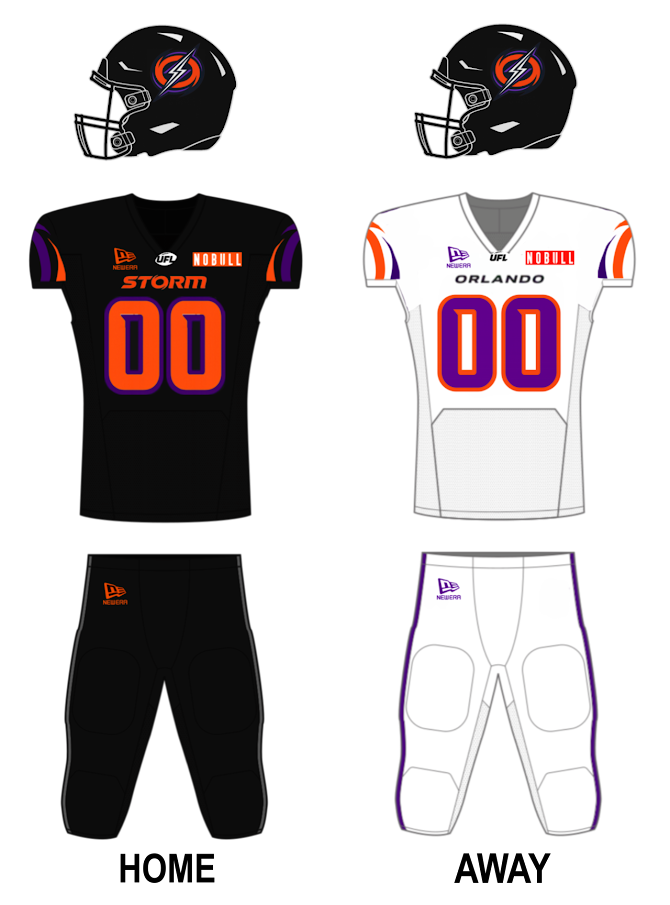
- Uniforms

General information
- Founded: October 7, 2025; 13 months ago
- Stadium: Inter.co Stadium; Orlando, Florida
- Colors: Gray, purple, electric orange
- Mascot: Kratos
- Website: www.theufl.com/orlando

Personnel
- Owner: League owned
- General manager: Anthony Becht
- Head coach: Anthony Becht

Team history
- Orlando Storm (2026–present)

Home fields
- Inter.co Stadium (2026–present)

League / conference affiliations
- United Football League (2026–present)

Playoff appearances (1)
- UFL: 2026

The Orlando Storm are a professional American football team based in Orlando, Florida. The Storm compete in the United Football League (UFL). The team was announced on October 7, 2025 as part of several major updates to the UFL which saw the replacement of three existing teams and the re-branding of others. The Storm are owned and operated by the UFL (a consortium of Mike Repole, Dwayne Johnson, Dany Garcia, RedBird Capital Partners and Fox Corporation) and play their home games at Inter.co Stadium.

== History ==
The XFL, one of the two partners that eventually merged into the UFL, had previously had two teams in Central Florida. In 2020, the XFL placed the Tampa Bay Vipers 80 miles southwest at Raymond James Stadium in Tampa, with the team's headquarters based between the two cities in Plant City. Orlando, which had been one of the most successful cities in the original XFL with the Orlando Rage, had not yet been available when the 2020 XFL was established because the Alliance of American Football had already established the Orlando Apollos there, that league's eventual de facto champion. Orlando eventually became available after the AAF's bankruptcy, and plans were being set to move the Vipers to Orlando before the XFL was forced to shut down in 2020 due to the COVID-19 pandemic. (The XFL's merger partner, the United States Football League, also included a "Tampa Bay Bandits" among its inaugural franchises in 2022, but this team did not survive to ever play in Florida, instead being replaced by the Memphis Showboats a year later.)

In 2023, following the XFL's pandemic-related hiatus and sale, the XFL would indeed return to Orlando, but in a different manner: the XFL Orlando team would instead receive the branding of the former New York Guardians, becoming the Orlando Guardians. The Guardians underperformed greatly compared to the Rage and the Apollos, and after finishing last in the XFL in 2023, it was excluded from the merger into the UFL. The UFL maintained a retainer agreement with Camping World Stadium in the event the league chose to return to Orlando.

On October 7, 2025, under new co-owner and business director Mike Repole, the UFL announced its return to Orlando with the establishment of the Orlando Storm. The Storm opted not to return to Camping World Stadium and instead chose the more intimate Inter.co Stadium, part of an initiative of Repole's to play in soccer-specific stadiums to take advantage of their smaller capacities for a more intimate crowd experience. Repole did not give a specific reason for the name (unlike the two other teams unveiled that day); the Storm brand has a long history in Central Florida football, having been used by the Tampa Bay Storm from 1991 to 2017. The Tampa Bay Storm had shared a bitter rivalry, the War on I-4, with Orlando's team, the Predators.

Even before the Apollos, the city of Orlando had a long list of minor league professional football teams, most of which existed in short-lived and failed leagues: the Panthers of the 1960s, the Blazers of the 1970s, the Americans and Renegades of the 1980s, the Thunder of the 1990s and the Tuskers in the late 2000s, in addition to the aforementioned Rage, Apollos, Guardians, Predators, and a second Predators. Repole expressed hope that the robust institutional backing the UFL has would, along with the more intimate fan experience at a smaller stadium, ensure the Storm's long-term stability and ease fans' concerns about the team disappearing.

Head coach Anthony Becht was reassigned from the St. Louis Battlehawks to the Orlando Storm on December 23, 2025.

== Current roster ==
=== Players ===
Orlando Storm roster
Quarterbacks (QB): 16 Hank Bachmeier; 1 Matt Corral; 13 Jack Plummer; Running backs (RB): 33 Elijah Dotson; Wide receivers (WR): 2 Elijhah Badger; 84 Aron Cruickshank; 3 K. J. Hamler; 85 Jerome Kapp; 12 Chris Rowland; 82 Sam Wiglusz; Tight ends (TE): 81 Konner Fox TE; 86 Steven Stillianos	Offensive linemen (OL): 54 Bryce Benhart RT; 75 Mike Edwards RG; 76 Joey Fisher RG; 74 Michael Gonzalez LG; 77 Jason Ivey LT; 73 Samuel Jackson RT; 56 Cole Schneider C; 68 Zuri Henry LT; 51 Mose Vavao C; Defensive linemen (DL): 95 Amani Bledsoe DT; 96 Isaiah Buggs DT; 17 Chris Collins DE; 30 Jasheen Davis DE; 48 Chris Garrett DE; 90 Fabien Lovett DT; 97 Isaiah Mack DT; 0 Pheldarius Payne DT; 98 Willie Yarbary DT	Linebackers (LB): 11 Tavante Beckett ILB; 58 Darien Butler ILB; 9 Deion Jennings ILB; 55 DeQuan Jackson ILB; 43 Kana'i Mauga ILB; 40 Andrew Parker Jr. ILB; Defensive backs (DB): 26 Nate Brooks CB; 27 Chris Claybrooks CB; 28 Allan George CB; 8 Mark Gilbert CB; 21 Lamar Jackson CB; 22 Nate Meadors FS; 20 Mishael Powell FS; 38 Brandon Sebastian CB; 21 Avery Young SS; Special teams (ST): 7 Michael Lantz K; 47 Alex Matheson LS	50 active As of October 1, 2026. Rookies in italics.: Roster

=== Staff ===
Orlando Storm staff
Head coach: Head coach – Anthony Becht; Offensive coaches: Co-offensive coordinator – Marc Colombo; Co-offensive coordinator – Colin Thompson; Quarterbacks – Jordan Kitna; Running backs – Art Valero	Defensive coaches: Defensive coordinator – Donnie Abraham; Defensive line – La'Roi Glover; Linebackers – Mike Phair; Special teams – Martin Bayless

== Player history ==
=== Current NFL players ===
Season	Pos	Name	NFL Team
2026	TE	Shawn Bowman	Arizona Cardinals

=== Notable players ===
Season	Pos	Name	Notes
2026	QB	Dorian Thompson-Robinson	Former Cleveland Browns Quarterback, 2023 5th Round Pick
2026–present	WR	K. J. Hamler	Former Denver Broncos Wide Receiver, 2020 2nd Round Pick
2026	QB	Matt Corral	Former Carolina Panthers Quarterback, 2022 3rd Round Pick

=== Most Valuable Player award winners ===
Storm UFL MVP winners
Year	Player	Position	Selector
2026	Jack Plummer	QB	UFL

== Coach history ==
=== Head coaches ===
#	Coach	Term	Regular season				Playoffs			Awards
#	Coach	Term	GC	W	L	Win %	GC	W	L	Awards
Orlando Storm
1	Anthony Becht	2026–present	10	8	2	.800	1	0	1	

=== Offensive coordinators ===
#	Coach	Term	Regular season				Playoffs			Awards
#	Coach	Term	GC	W	L	Win %	GC	W	L	Awards
Orlando Storm
1	Marc Colombo	2026–present	10	8	2	.800	1	0	1	
1	Colin Thompson	2026–present	10	8	2	.800	1	0	1	

=== Defensive coordinators ===
#	Coach	Term	Regular season				Playoffs			Awards
#	Coach	Term	GC	W	L	Win %	GC	W	L	Awards
Orlando Storm
1	Donnie Abraham	2026–present	10	8	2	.800	1	0	1	

== Season by season record ==
UFL champions^{†} (2024–present)	Conference champions^{*}	Division champions^{^}	Wild Card berth^{#}

Season	Team	League	Conference	Division	Regular season			Postseason results	Awards	Head coaches	Pct.
Season	Team	League	Conference	Division	Finish	W	L	Postseason results	Awards	Head coaches	Pct.
2026	2026	UFL	—N/a	—N/a	1st^{#}	8	2	Lost Semifinals (Defenders) 22–28		Anthony Becht	.800
Total						8	2	All-time regular season record (2026–)			.800
Total						0	1	All-time postseason record (2026–)			.000
Total						8	3	All-time regular season and postseason record (2026–)			.727

=== Franchise matchup history ===
As of 2026 UFL season

Team	Record	Pct.
Birmingham Stallions	1–1	.500
Columbus Aviators	1–0	1.000
Dallas Renegades	1–0	1.000
DC Defenders	2–1	.667
Houston Gamblers	1–0	1.000
Louisville Kings	2–0	1.000
St. Louis Battlehawks	0–1	.000

== Records ==
All-time Storm leaders
Leader	Player	Record	Years with Storm
Passing yards	Jack Plummer	7,400 passing yards	2026–present
Passing touchdowns	Jack Plummer	18 passing touchdowns	2026–present
Rushing yards	Jashaun Corbin	438 rushing yards	2026–present
Rushing touchdowns	Jashaun Corbin	3 rushing touchdowns	2026–present
Receiving yards	Elijhah Badger	588 receiving yards	2026–present
Receiving touchdowns	Elijhah Badger	5 receiving touchdowns	2026–present
Receptions	Chris Rowland	53 receptions	2026–present
Tackles	Darien Butler	53 tackles	2026–present
Sacks	Keshawn Banks	5 sacks	2026–present
Interceptions	Mishael Powell	2 interceptions	2026–present
Coaching wins	Anthony Becht	8 wins	2026–present
