= Colin Thompson (American football) =

American football player (born 1993)

Orlando Storm
- Title: Offensive coordinator

Personal information
- Born: December 15, 1993 (age 32); Doylestown, Pennsylvania, U.S.
- Listed height: 6 ft 4 in (1.93 m)
- Listed weight: 255 lb (116 kg)

Career information
- Position: Tight end
- High school: Archbishop Wood (Warminster, Pennsylvania)
- College: Florida (2012–2013); Temple (2014–2016)
- NFL draft: 2017: undrafted

Career history

Playing
- New York Giants (2017)*; Chicago Bears (2017–2018)*; Birmingham Iron (2019); Tampa Bay Vipers (2020); Carolina Panthers (2020–2022); Minnesota Vikings (2023)*
- * Offseason or practice squad member only

Coaching
- Orlando Storm (2026–present) Offensive coordinator

Career NFL statistics
- Receptions: 1
- Receiving yards: 7
- Receiving touchdowns: 1
- Stats at Pro Football Reference

Colin Thompson (born December 15, 1993) is an American former professional football player who was a tight end in the National Football League (NFL). He is currently the co-offensive coordinator and wide receivers coach for the Orlando Storm of the United Football League (UFL). He played college football for the Florida Gators and Temple Owls.

== Early life ==
Thompson attended Archbishop Wood Catholic High School. He suffered an injury to the fifth metatarsal bone in his right foot during his senior year. Thompson helped Archbishop Wood win the PIAA championship during his senior year. He was ranked the No. 2 tight end in the country and played in the 2012 Under Armour All-American Game.

== College career ==
Thompson began his college career at Florida. During his freshman year, he re-injured the same foot he injured in high school and was ruled medically ineligible. After being cleared to return to football, Thompson transferred to Temple, the only university to offer him a scholarship. As a senior, he had three receptions for 43 yards and a touchdown and helped the team finish 10–4. Thompson caught 19 passes for 208 yards and a touchdown for the Owls. He earned a degree in media communications.

== Professional career ==
=== New York Giants ===
After going undrafted in the 2017 NFL draft, Thompson signed with the New York Giants as a priority free agent on May 1 because he liked the organization. After undergoing an appendectomy during the preseason, Thompson was waived on August 14.

=== Chicago Bears ===
The Chicago Bears signed him to their practice squad on November 7, following an injury to Zach Miller. Thompson was waived on December 2, but was re-signed three days later. The Bears signed Thompson to a reserve/futures contract on January 2, 2018. During the 2018 preseason, Thompson caught three passes for 43 yards and a touchdown, but was waived on September 1.

=== Birmingham Iron ===
Thompson joined the Birmingham Iron of the Alliance of American Football in 2019, signing after a two-person tryout following injuries to Birmingham's tight ends. He played tight end and special teams for the Iron before the league folded after Week 8. "This league, I thought, was great and I thought this would make it and break the trend of minor league football not making it. I enjoyed my time here," Thompson said of his experience in the AAF. Thompson worked as a host on 97.3 ESPN radio and a sideline reporter for Temple Owls football games.

=== Tampa Bay Vipers ===
Thompson was selected by the Tampa Bay Vipers of the XFL in the open phase of the 2020 XFL draft on October 16, 2019. Ron Selesky, the Vipers' director of operations and who held the same role with the Birmingham Iron, recommended Thompson to Vipers tight end coach Pete Mangurian, who invited him to try out for the team. On March 1, 2020, during a game against the DC Defenders, Thompson made an acrobatic catch and fell forward for a 13-yard gain after DC safety Rahim Moore deflected the ball in the air. The XFL season was suspended after Week 5 due to the coronavirus pandemic, and Thompson said he thoroughly enjoyed the experience. He had his contract terminated when the league suspended operations on April 10, 2020.

=== Carolina Panthers ===
On April 27, 2020, the Carolina Panthers signed Thompson, reuniting him with former Temple head coach Matt Rhule and former Temple teammates P. J. Walker, Robby Anderson, and Keith Kirkwood. He was waived on September 5, 2020, but re-signed two days later after Keith Kirkwood was placed on injured reserve. Thompson scored a touchdown on the first touch of his NFL career, a pass from Teddy Bridgewater in the first quarter of Carolina's Week 10 matchup against the Tampa Bay Buccaneers. Thompson signed a one-year contract extension with the Panthers on January 4, 2021.

On December 14, 2021, Thompson was waived by the Panthers and re-signed to the practice squad. He signed a reserve/future contract with the Panthers on January 10, 2022.

On August 30, 2022, Thompson was waived by the Panthers and signed to the practice squad the next day.

=== Minnesota Vikings ===
On July 24, 2023, Thompson signed with the Minnesota Vikings. He was waived on August 28, 2023.

== Coaching career ==
Colin served as an offensive assistant at Lower Cape May Regional High School from 2019 to 2025, working with the offensive unit and assisting with game planning. In 2025, he joined the Minnesota Vikings as a training camp intern coaching tight ends and linebackers. Later that year, Thompson accepted a role as an offensive assistant with the United States Naval Academy football program. In 2026, he was named the wideouts coach for the Orlando Storm of the United Football League (UFL), before being promoted to Offensive Coordinator shortly after.

== Personal life ==
Thompson is the son of Karen and Dave Thompson. He and his wife, Sydney, met while both playing collegiate sports at The University of Florida. His brother, Kerry, is a former high school All American in Swimming. His mother is a high school friend of Thompson's Birmingham Iron coach, Tim Lewis. She owns Cotton Company and Lace Silhouettes Lingerie in the Washington Street Mall in Cape May, New Jersey, while his father is a realtor. Thompson has served as the offensive coordinator for Lower Cape May Regional High School.
