= Cole Schneider (American football) =

American football player (born 1998)

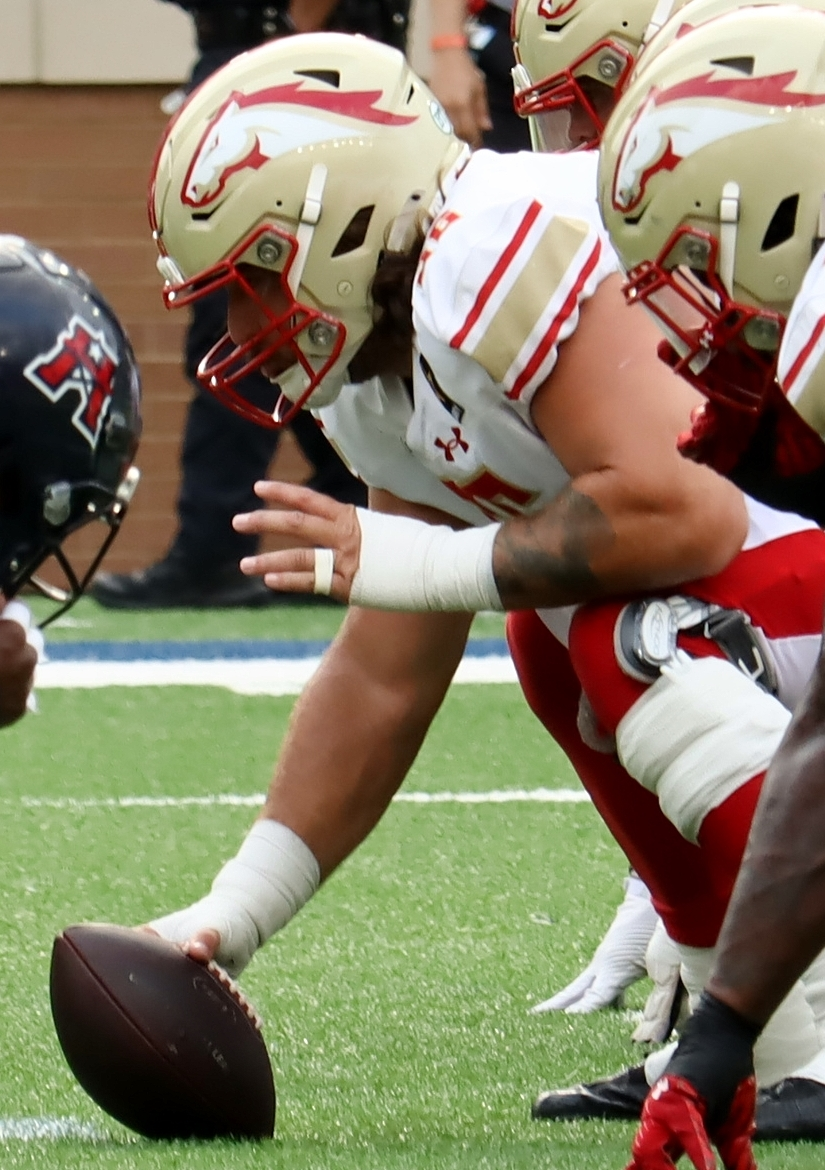
- Schneider with the Birmingham Stallions in 2024

No. 56 – Orlando Storm
- Position: Guard
- Roster status: Active

Personal information
- Born: August 13, 1998 (age 28); Fort Myers, Florida, U.S.
- Listed height: 6 ft 3 in (1.91 m)
- Listed weight: 324 lb (147 kg)

Career information
- High school: Riverdale
- College: UCF
- NFL draft: 2022: undrafted

Career history
- Green Bay Packers (2022)*; Birmingham Stallions (2023); Green Bay Packers (2023)*; Birmingham Stallions (2024–2025); Orlando Storm (2026–present)
- * Offseason or practice squad member only

Awards and highlights
- UFL champion (2024); USFL champion (2023); Colley Matrix national champion (2017); 2× First-team All-AAC (2018, 2020); 2× Second-team All-AAC (2019, 2021)
- Stats at Pro Football Reference

Cole Schneider (born August 13, 1998) is an American professional football guard for the Orlando Storm of the United Football League (UFL). He played college football at UCF. He was signed as an undrafted by the Green Bay Packers in 2022.

== College career ==
Schneider attended the University of Central Florida (UCF), playing from 2017 to 2021.

== Professional career ==
Pre-draft measurables
Height	Weight	Arm length	Hand span	Wingspan	40-yard dash	10-yard split	20-yard split	20-yard shuttle	Three-cone drill	Vertical jump	Broad jump	Bench press
6 ft 3 1/8 in (1.91 m)	309 lb (140 kg)	31 5/8 in (0.80 m)	9 5/8 in (0.24 m)	6 ft 4 3/8 in (1.94 m)	5.24 s	1.70 s	3.02 s	5.12 s	8.18 s	28.5 in (0.72 m)	8 ft 9 in (2.67 m)	29 reps
All values from Pro Day

=== Green Bay Packers (first stint) ===
After going undrafted in the 2022 NFL draft, Schneider signed with the Green Bay Packers in late April. He was released on August 15.

=== Birmingham Stallions (first stint) ===
Schneider signed with the Birmingham Stallions of the United States Football League (USFL). He played a key role on the Stallions and was part of the 2023 USFL Championship Game.

=== Green Bay Packers (second stint) ===
On August 2, 2023, Schneider re-signed with the Packers. He was released on August 29.

=== Birmingham Stallions (second stint) ===
Schneider re-signed with the Stallions on September 14, 2023. He re-signed with the team again on August 26, 2024.

=== Orlando Storm ===
On January 12, 2026, Schneider was allocated to the Orlando Storm of the United Football League (UFL).
