= Brandon Sebastian =

American football player (born 1999)

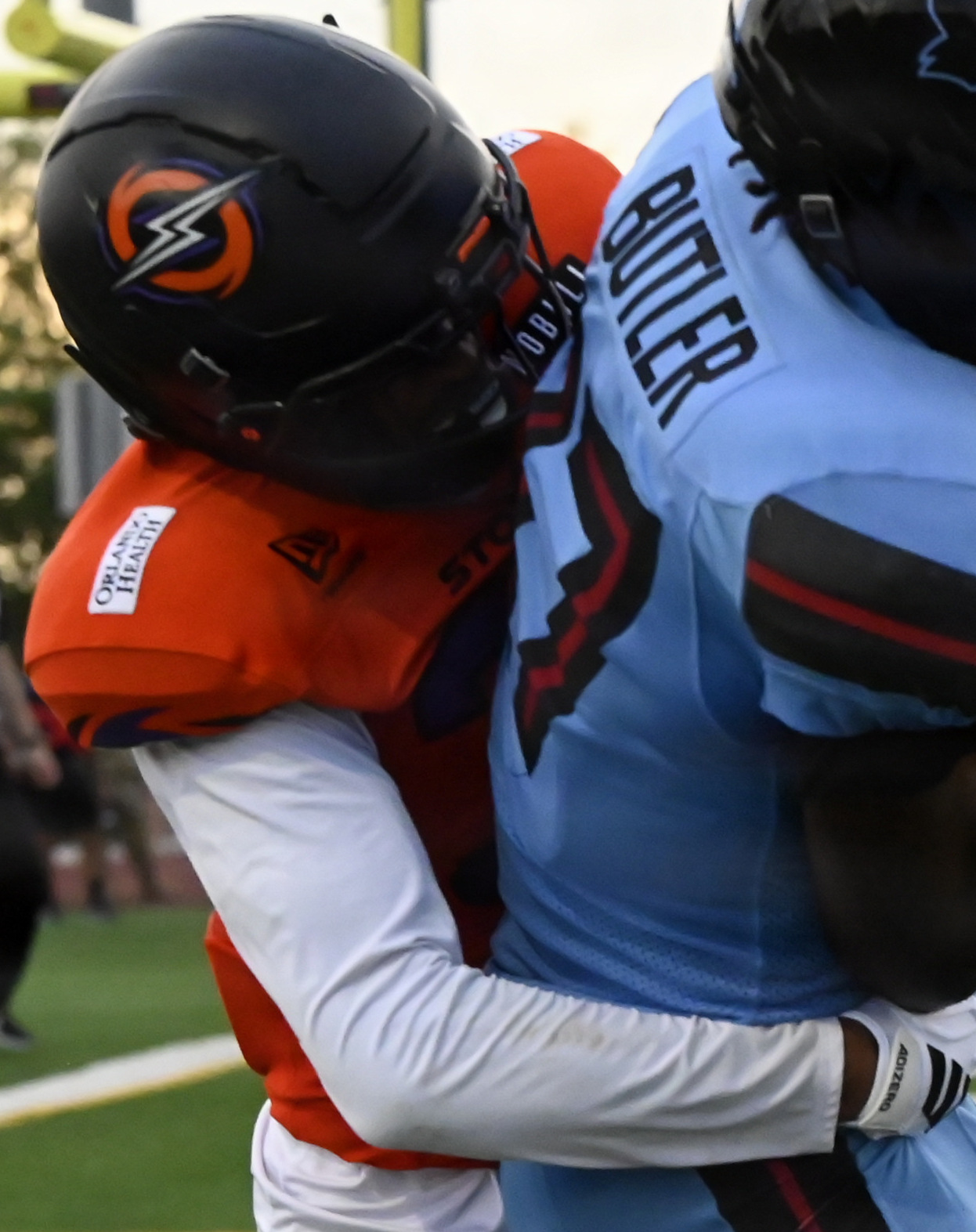
- Sebastian in 2026

No. 38 – Orlando Storm
- Position: Cornerback
- Roster status: Active

Personal information
- Born: March 5, 1999 (age 27)
- Listed height: 6 ft 0 in (1.83 m)
- Listed weight: 176 lb (80 kg)

Career information
- High school: Cheshire Academy (Cheshire, Connecticut)
- College: Boston College (2017–2021)
- NFL draft: 2022: undrafted

Career history
- Los Angeles Chargers (2022)*; St. Louis Battlehawks (2023–2025); Dallas Renegades (2026)*; Orlando Storm (2026–present)
- * Offseason or practice squad member only

Career XFL statistics as of 2023
- Total tackles: 25
- Interceptions: 3

Brandon Myles Sebastian (born March 5, 1999) is an American professional football cornerback for the Orlando Storm of the United Football League (UFL). He played college football at Boston College and has also played for the Los Angeles Chargers of the National Football League (NFL).

== College career ==
Sebastian was a member of Boston College from 2017 to 2021. In 2017, he redshirted during his first season, but in 2018, Sebastian played in 12 games at cornerback with seven starts, recording over 49 tackles, two pass breakups and one interception. In 2019, he started in all 13 games, recording over 45 tackles with a team-high nine PBUs and one interception. In 2020, Sebastian played in all 11 games with eight starts at cornerback while totaling 32 tackles. In 2021, he played in 10 games recording 15 tackles. He finished his collegiate career playing in 44 games, recording 141 total tackles, eight interceptions, one forced fumble and four tackles for loss.

== Professional career ==
Pre-draft measurables
| Height | Weight | Arm length | Hand span | Wingspan | 40-yard dash | 10-yard split | 20-yard split | 20-yard shuttle | Three-cone drill | Vertical jump | Broad jump | Bench press |
|---|---|---|---|---|---|---|---|---|---|---|---|---|
| 6 ft 0 1/8 in (1.83 m) | 182 lb (83 kg) | 31 3/4 in (0.81 m) | 8 1/2 in (0.22 m) | 6 ft 3 3/4 in (1.92 m) | 4.60 s | 1.62 s | 2.68 s | 4.37 s | 7.12 s | 35.0 in (0.89 m) | 10 ft 4 in (3.15 m) | 10 reps |
All values from Pro Day

=== Los Angeles Chargers ===
After going undrafted in the 2022 NFL draft, Sebastian signed with the Los Angeles Chargers on May 1, 2022. He was released on August 30, 2022.

=== St. Louis Battlehawks ===
On November 15, 2022, Sebastian was drafted by the St. Louis Battlehawks of the XFL. On April 22, 2022, Sebastian had an interception which eventually led to a 29-yard reception by Hakeem Butler on a pass from A. J. McCarron, and an eventual touchdown by Kareem Walker that helped secure a team victory 53–28 vs the Orlando Guardians. Sebastian started and appeared in all 10 games during the 2023 XFL season while recording over 25 tackles and three interceptions. He re-signed with the team on January 29, 2024. He was placed on injured reserve on May 15, 2024. He re-signed with the team again on August 26, 2024.

=== Dallas Renegades ===
On January 13, 2026, Sebastian was selected by the Dallas Renegades in the 2026 UFL Draft. He was released on March 20.

=== Orlando Storm ===
On March 20, 2026, Sebastian was claimed off waivers by the Orlando Storm.
