= Amani Bledsoe =

American football player (born 1998)

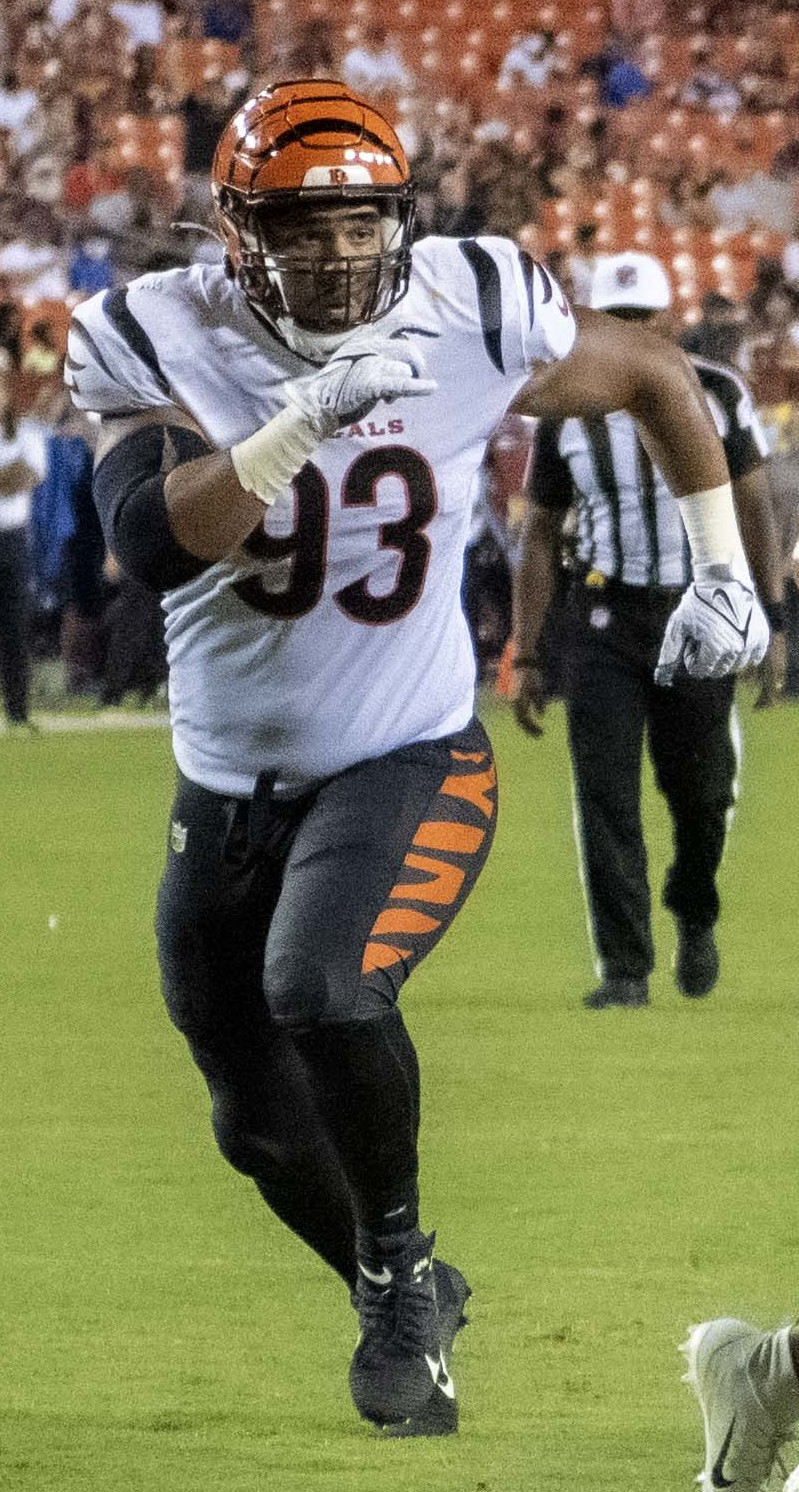
- Bledsoe with the Cincinnati Bengals in 2021

No. 95 – Ottawa Redblacks
- Position: Defensive end
- Roster status: Active
- CFL status: American

Personal information
- Born: February 6, 1998 (age 28); Lawrence, Kansas, U.S.
- Listed height: 6 ft 4 in (1.93 m)
- Listed weight: 295 lb (134 kg)

Career information
- High school: Lawrence (KS)
- College: Oklahoma (2016–2018)
- NFL draft: 2019: undrafted

Career history
- Tennessee Titans (2019–2020)*; Cincinnati Bengals (2020); Tennessee Titans (2021); Atlanta Falcons (2022–2023)*; Arlington Renegades (2025); Birmingham Stallions (2026); Orlando Storm (2026); BC Lions (2026)*; Ottawa Redblacks (2026–present)
- * Offseason or practice squad member only

Career NFL statistics
- Total tackles: 18
- Stats at Pro Football Reference

Amani Elijah Bledsoe (born February 6, 1998) is an American professional football defensive end for the Ottawa Redblacks of the Canadian Football League (CFL). He played college football at Oklahoma and was signed by the Tennessee Titans as an undrafted free agent in 2019. He has also played for the Cincinnati Bengals.

== College career ==
Bledsoe was a member of the Oklahoma Sooners for three seasons. He declared for the 2019 NFL Draft after his junior year. Bledsoe finished his collegiate career with 59 tackles, 7.5 tackles for loss and four sacks.

== Professional career ==
Pre-draft measurables
Height	Weight	Arm length	Hand span	Wingspan	40-yard dash	10-yard split	20-yard split	20-yard shuttle	Three-cone drill	Vertical jump	Broad jump	Bench press
6 ft 4 1/2 in (1.94 m)	280 lb (127 kg)	32 1/4 in (0.82 m)	9 3/8 in (0.24 m)	6 ft 5 3/8 in (1.97 m)	4.94 s	1.70 s	2.83 s	4.58 s	7.69 s	31.0 in (0.79 m)	9 ft 7 in (2.92 m)	25 reps
All values from Pro Day

=== Tennessee Titans (first stint) ===
Bledsoe was signed by the Tennessee Titans as an undrafted free agent on April 27, 2019. He was waived during final roster cuts and then re-signed to the team's practice squad, where he remained for the rest of the season. The Titans waived Bledsoe on July 26, 2020.

=== Cincinnati Bengals ===
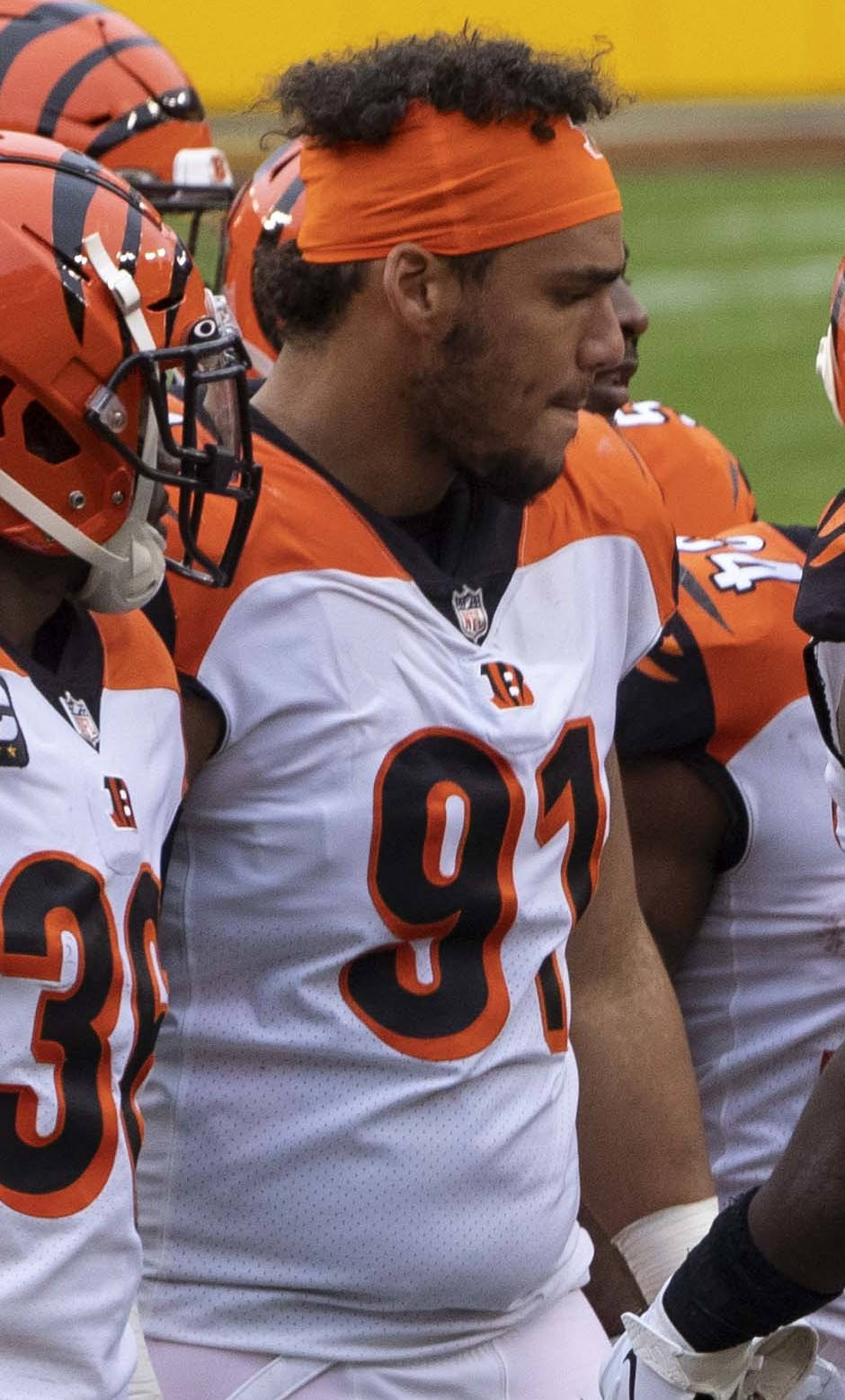
Bledsoe with Cincinnati in 2020

Bledsoe was signed by the Cincinnati Bengals on August 15, 2020. Bledsoe was waived during final roster cuts on September 5, and signed to the team's practice squad the next day. He was elevated to the active roster for the season opener against the Los Angeles Chargers on September 13, and reverted to the practice squad the next day. Bledsoe was promoted to the active roster on September 15. He was placed on the reserve/COVID-19 list by the team on December 6, and activated on December 16.

Bledsoe re-signed on a one-year contract with the Bengals on March 31, 2021. He was waived by Cincinnati prior to the start of the regular season on August 31.

=== Tennessee Titans (second stint) ===
On September 2, 2021, Bledsoe was signed to the Tennessee Titans' practice squad. He was promoted to the active roster on October 8. Bledsoe was waived on November 15 and re-signed to the practice squad.

=== Atlanta Falcons ===
On November 1, 2022, Bledsoe was signed to the Atlanta Falcons' practice squad. He signed a reserve/future contract with Atlanta on January 9, 2023. Bledsoe was waived by the Falcons on April 14.

=== Arlington Renegades ===
On January 23, 2025, Bledsoe signed with the Arlington Renegades of the United Football League (UFL).

=== Birmingham Stallions ===
On January 13, 2026, Bledsoe was selected by the Birmingham Stallions in the 2026 UFL Draft.

=== Orlando Storm ===
On April 19, 2026, Bledsoe and Matt Corral were traded to the Orlando Storm in exchange for Dorian Thompson-Robinson.

=== BC Lions ===
On August 19, 2026, Bledsoe left the Storm to sign a practice roster contract with the BC Lions of the Canadian Football League (CFL), but was subsequently released two weeks later on September 5, 2026.

=== Ottawa Redblacks ===
On September 7, 2026, Bledsoe signed with the Ottawa Redblacks.
