= Elijhah Badger =

American football player (born 2001)

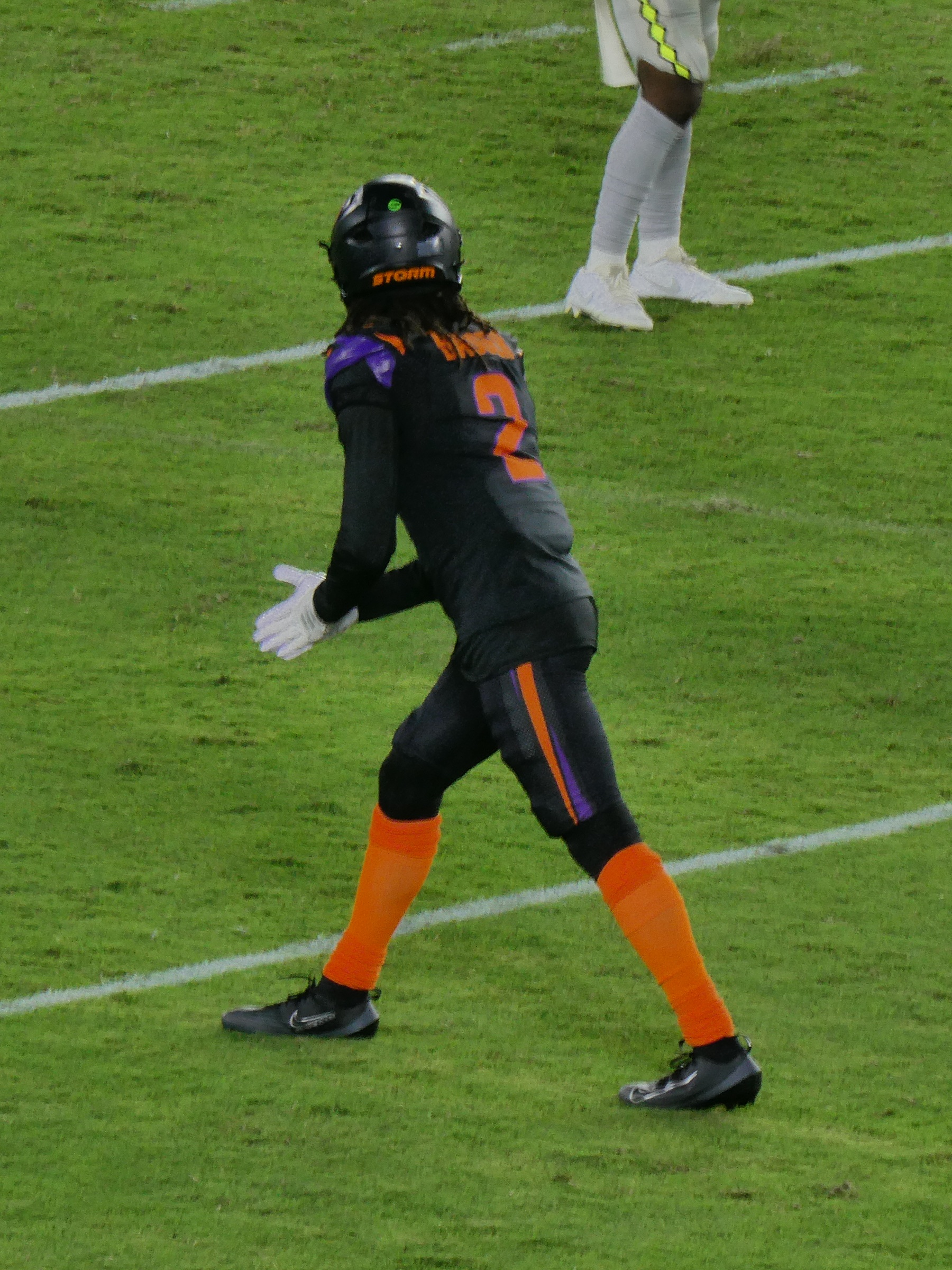
- Badger with the Orlando Storm in 2026

No. 2 – Orlando Storm
- Position: Wide receiver
- Roster status: Active

Personal information
- Born: August 15, 2001 (age 25); Sacramento, California, U.S.
- Listed height: 6 ft 1 in (1.85 m)
- Listed weight: 196 lb (89 kg)

Career information
- High school: Folsom (Folsom, California)
- College: Arizona State (2020–2023); Florida (2024)
- NFL draft: 2025: undrafted

Career history
- Kansas City Chiefs (2025)*; Orlando Storm (2026–present)
- * Offseason or practice squad member only
- Stats at Pro Football Reference

Elijhah Badger (born August 15, 2001) is an American professional football wide receiver for the Orlando Storm of the United Football League (UFL). He played college football for the Arizona State Sun Devils and Florida Gators.

== Early life ==
Badger attended Folsom High School in Folsom, California. During his high school career, he had 183 receptions for 3,398 yards and 52 touchdowns. He committed to Arizona State University to play college football.

== College career ==
=== Arizona State ===
Badger played in one game his first year at Arizona State in 2020 and was redshirted. As a redshirt freshman in 2021, he played in 11 games and had seven receptions for 61 yards. As a redshirt sophomore in 2022, Badger became the number one receiver. He finished the year with 70 receptions for 864 yards and seven touchdowns. He returned as the team's number one receiver his redshirt junior year in 2023. On April 19, 2024, Badger entered the transfer portal.

=== Florida ===
On May 17, 2024, Badger announced that he would transfer to Florida.

== Professional career ==
Pre-draft measurables
Height	Weight	Arm length	Hand span	Wingspan	40-yard dash	10-yard split	20-yard split	Vertical jump
6 ft 1 3/8 in (1.86 m)	200 lb (91 kg)	32 1/8 in (0.82 m)	9 1/2 in (0.24 m)	6 ft 6 5/8 in (2.00 m)	4.43 s	1.53 s	2.60 s	35.5 in (0.90 m)
All values from NFL Combine

=== Kansas City Chiefs ===
Badger signed with the Kansas City Chiefs as an undrafted free agent on May 3, 2025. He was waived on August 26 as part of final roster cuts.

=== Orlando Storm ===
On January 12, 2026, Badger was allocated to the Orlando Storm of the United Football League (UFL).
