= Art Valero =

American football coach (born 1958)

Orlando Storm
- Title: Running backs coach

Personal information
- Born: May 12, 1958 (age 68); Whittier, California, U.S.

Career information
- College: Boise State

Career history
- Boise State (1981–1982) Offensive line coach; Iowa State (1983) Offensive line coach; Long Beach State (1984–1986) Offensive line coach; New Mexico (1987–1989) Offensive line coach; Idaho (1990–1993) Offensive line coach/assistant head coach; Idaho (1994) Offensive coordinator/offensive line coach/assistant head coach; Utah State (1995–1997) Offensive line coach/assistant head coach; Louisville (1998–2001) Offensive line coach/assistant head coach; Tampa Bay Buccaneers (2002–2003) Tight ends coach; Tampa Bay Buccaneers (2004–2005) Running backs coach; Tampa Bay Buccaneers (2006–2007) Running backs coach/assistant head coach; St. Louis Rams (2008) Running backs coach/assistant head coach; St. Louis Rams (2009) Assistant offensive line coach; Seattle Seahawks (2010) Offensive line coach; Tennessee Titans (2011) Assistant offensive line coach; Colorado State (2013–2014) Tight ends coach; Texas Tech (2021) Senior defensive analyst; St. Louis BattleHawks (2023) Running backs coach; Orlando Storm (2026–present) Running backs coach

Awards and highlights
- Super Bowl champion (XXXVII); NCAA Division I-AA national champion (1980)

Art Valero (born May 12, 1958) is an American football coach who is the running backs coach for the Orlando Storm of the United Football League (UFL). He served as an assistant coach for the Tampa Bay Buccaneers, St. Louis Rams, Seattle Seahawks and Tennessee Titans.

Valero was officially hired by the St. Louis BattleHawks on September 13, 2022. He did not return for 2024.
