= Matt Corral =

Mexican-American football player (born 1999)

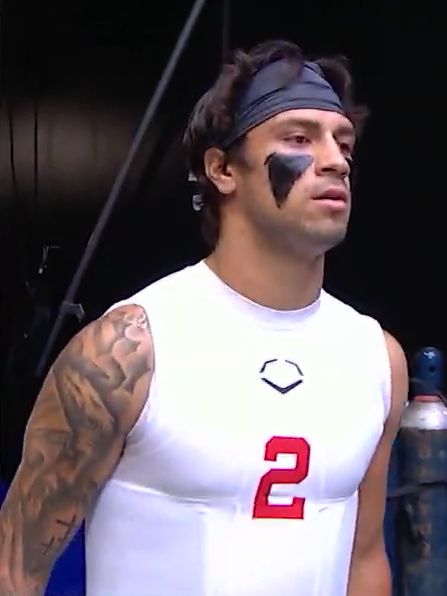
- Corral with the Ole Miss Rebels in 2021

Profile
- Position: Quarterback

Personal information
- Born: January 31, 1999 (age 27); Ventura, California, U.S.
- Listed height: 6 ft 1 in (1.85 m)
- Listed weight: 210 lb (95 kg)

Career information
- High school: Long Beach Polytechnic; (Long Beach, California)
- College: Ole Miss (2018–2021)
- NFL draft: 2022: 3rd round, 94th overall pick

Career history
- Carolina Panthers (2022); New England Patriots (2023); Birmingham Stallions (2024); Minnesota Vikings (2024)*; Birmingham Stallions (2025–2026); Orlando Storm (2026)
- * Offseason or practice squad member only

Awards and highlights
- UFL champion (2024); Conerly Trophy (2021); Second-team All-SEC (2021)
- Stats at Pro Football Reference

Matthew Anthony Corral (born January 31, 1999) is an American professional football quarterback. He played college football for the Ole Miss Rebels and was selected by the Carolina Panthers in the third round of the 2022 NFL draft.

== Early life ==
Of Mexican heritage, Corral was born on January 31, 1999, in Ventura, California. He later attended Oaks Christian School in Westlake Village, California, before transferring to Long Beach Polytechnic High School in Long Beach, California. He later stated he switched schools due to Oaks Christian being for "rich kids" that were "never going to have to work a day in their lives", as well as a physical altercation with a son of Wayne Gretzky that finalized his decision to transfer.

Corral totaled over 11,000 yards with 123 touchdowns during his high-school career and played in the 2018 U.S. Army All-American Bowl. He originally committed to play college football at the University of Southern California then the University of Florida before eventually choosing Ole Miss.

== College career ==
During his first year at the University of Mississippi in 2018, Corral played in four games as Jordan Ta'amu's backup. He completed 16 of 22 passes for 239 yards with two touchdowns and one interception. As a result of his limited action in 2018, Corral was redshirted.

Corral was named the starting quarterback entering the 2019 season. In a week 2 matchup against Arkansas, he completed 16 of 24 passes for 246 yards, resulting in a 31–17 win. In the game, he set career highs in attempts, passing yards, and completions, leading to him being named Southeastern Conference freshman of the week. Corral led the Rebels to a 4–8 record in his first season as a starter, completing 105 of 178 passes for 1,362 passing yards, six touchdowns and three interceptions.

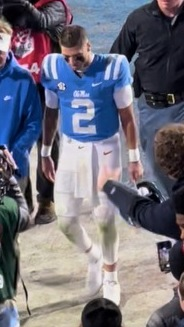
Corral with Ole Miss in 2021

In his first season under new Rebels head coach Lane Kiffin and offensive coordinator Jeff Lebby, Corral started every game of the abridged 2020 season and improved on his performance from 2019, passing for 3,337 yards with 29 touchdowns and 14 interceptions and he led the Rebels to the 2021 Outback Bowl, where he was named its MVP after Ole Miss defeated the Indiana Hoosiers by a score of 26–20.

In 2021, Corral tied the school record for touchdowns in a game with seven as a junior, throwing for three and rushing for four against the Tulane Green Wave. In what would be his final season at Ole Miss, Corral would lead the Rebels to a 10–2 record and a bowl appearance at the Sugar Bowl. Corral finished the season with 258 completions of 378 attempts for 3,333 passing yards, 20 touchdowns and four interceptions. Corral declared for the 2022 NFL draft at the end of the season prior to playing in the 2022 Sugar Bowl. There, he suffered a leg injury in the first quarter and was carted off.

== Professional career ==
Pre-draft measurables
Height	Weight	Arm length	Hand span	Wingspan	Wonderlic
6 ft 1 5/8 in (1.87 m)	212 lb (96 kg)	30 3/4 in (0.78 m)	9 5/8 in (0.24 m)	6 ft 2 1/2 in (1.89 m)	15
All values from NFL Combine

=== Carolina Panthers ===
Corral was selected by the Carolina Panthers in the third round (94th overall) of the 2022 NFL draft. He suffered a Lisfranc injury in a preseason game against the New England Patriots and was placed on season-ending injured reserve, missing his entire rookie season. Corral was waived by the Panthers on August 30, 2023, a day after having made the initial 53-man roster for the regular season.

=== New England Patriots ===
On August 31, 2023, Corral was claimed off waivers by the New England Patriots. Corral was placed on the exempt/left squad list by the Patriots on September 9, after leaving the team's facility without notice and failing to report in for two consecutive days. He was released on September 18, and signed to the practice squad after clearing waivers the next day. The next day, it was reported that he would no longer be re-signing with the practice squad.

=== Birmingham Stallions (first stint) ===
On February 13, 2024, Corral signed with the Birmingham Stallions of the United Football League (UFL). His contract was terminated on August 16, to sign with an NFL team.

=== Minnesota Vikings ===
On August 16, 2024, Corral signed with the Minnesota Vikings, after their first round quarterback pick J. J. McCarthy was placed on the injured reserve list. He was waived on August 26.

=== Birmingham Stallions (second stint) ===
On December 26, 2024, Corral re-signed with the Birmingham Stallions of the United Football League (UFL). He was placed on injured reserve on May 2, 2025, and activated on June 2.

Corral entered the USFL Conference Championship in relief of J'Mar Smith on June 8. Corral led the Stallions on two successful touchdown drives before surrendering a game-clinching interception in the fourth quarter, ending hopes of a comeback as the Michigan Panthers handed the Stallions their first playoff loss.

On October 3, 2025, two days after UFL free agency opened, Corral signed with the Michigan Panthers. However, after the Panthers franchise folded the same day, Corral was re-drafted by the Stallions in the quarterback portion of the 2026 UFL draft. He was named the Stallions' starting quarterback heading into the season and started the team's first four games before being traded.

=== Orlando Storm ===
On April 19, 2026, Corral and Amani Bledsoe were traded to the Orlando Storm in exchange for Dorian Thompson-Robinson. Corral was named the Storm's third-string quarterback behind Jack Plummer and Hank Bachmeier.

== Career statistics ==
=== UFL ===
Legend
	Led the league
	League champion
**Bold**	Career high

==== Regular season ====
Year	Team	Games			Passing								Rushing			
Year	Team	GP	GS	Record	Cmp	Att	Pct	Yds	Y/A	TD	Int	Rtg	Att	Yds	Avg	TD
2024	BHAM	6	3	3–0	36	62	58.1	494	8.0	2	2	81.0	15	104	6.9	0
2025	BHAM	3	2	2–0	51	95	53.7	648	6.8	4	4	71.7	17	91	5.4	0
2026	BHAM	4	4	1–3	71	110	64.5	769	7.0	5	4	85.0	7	9	1.3	0
Career		13	9	6–3	158	267	59.2	1,911	7.2	11	10	79.3	39	204	5.2	0

==== Postseason ====
Year	Team	Games			Passing								Rushing			
Year	Team	GP	GS	Record	Cmp	Att	Pct	Yds	Y/A	TD	Int	Rtg	Att	Yds	Avg	TD
2024	BHAM	1	0	—	9	11	81.8	120	10.9	2	1	113.8	1	2	2.0	0
2025	BHAM	1	0	—	12	25	48.0	147	5.9	2	1	76.6	3	18	6.0	0
Career		2	0	0–0	21	36	58.3	267	7.4	4	2	95.5	4	20	5.0	0

=== College ===
Year	Team	Games			Passing								Rushing			
Year	Team	GP	GS	Record	Cmp	Att	Pct	Yds	Avg	TD	Int	Rtg	Att	Yds	Avg	TD
2018	Ole Miss	4	0	—	16	22	72.7	239	10.9	2	1	184.9	13	83	**6.4**	2
2019	Ole Miss	10	4	2−2	105	178	59.0	1,362	7.7	6	3	131.0	57	135	2.4	1
2020	Ole Miss	10	10	5−5	231	326	**70.9**	3,337	10.2	**29**	**14**	**177.6**	112	506	4.5	4
2021	Ole Miss	**13**	**13**	**10−3**	**262**	**386**	67.9	**3,349**	8.7	20	5	155.3	**152**	**614**	4.0	**11**
Career		37	27	17−10	612	910	67.3	8,281	9.1	57	23	159.3	334	1,338	4.0	18
