= Jerome Kapp =

American football player (born 1999)

No. 85 – Orlando Storm
- Position: Wide receiver
- Roster status: Active

Personal information
- Born: December 9, 1999 (age 26); Scranton, Pennsylvania, U.S.
- Listed height: 6 ft 1 in (1.85 m)
- Listed weight: 205 lb (93 kg)

Career information
- High school: Boyertown
- College: Seton Hill (2018); Kutztown (2019–2022)
- NFL draft: 2023: undrafted

Career history
- New York Jets (2023)*; St. Louis Battlehawks (2024–2025); Orlando Storm (2026–present)
- * Offseason or practice squad member only

Jerome Kapp (born December 9, 1999) is an American football wide receiver for the Orlando Storm of the United Football League (UFL). He played college football at Seton Hill and Kutztown.

== Early life ==
Kapp attended Boyertown Area Senior High School. In three seasons, Kapp had 68 catches for 1,284 yards and 15 receiving touchdowns. On defense, he had 128 total tackles, 13 interceptions, two forced fumbles, and three fumble recoveries.

== College career ==
In 2018, Kapp began his college football career at Seton Hill as a redshirt freshman.

In 2019, Kapp transferred to Kutztown. As a freshman, he had 32 receptions for 462 yards and five touchdowns, as well as three rushing attempts for 24 yards, in 12 games. In 2020, Kapp's sophomore season was canceled due to COVID-19. As a junior in 2021, Kapp had 43 receptions for 812 yards and 8 touchdowns in 13 games. In 2022, as a senior, he had 47 receptions for 916 yards and 9 touchdowns in 11 games. At Kutztown, Kapp had a total of 122 receptions for 2,190 yards and 22 touchdowns in 36 games. He is ranked third in receiving yards and is tied for fourth in receiving touchdowns in Kutztown's history, ranking him above Andre Reed in both categories.

== Professional career ==
Pre-draft measurables
Height	Weight	Arm length	Hand span	Wingspan	40-yard dash	10-yard split	20-yard split	20-yard shuttle	Three-cone drill	Vertical jump	Broad jump	Bench press
6 ft 1 1/2 in (1.87 m)	191 lb (87 kg)	32 1/4 in (0.82 m)	10 in (0.25 m)	6 ft 6 3/8 in (1.99 m)	4.58 s	1.56 s	2.64 s	4.35 s	6.79 s	36.0 in (0.91 m)	10 ft 5 in (3.18 m)	13 reps
All values from Pro Day

=== New York Jets ===
On May 25, 2023, the New York Jets signed Kapp to a three-year, $2.695 million contract as an undrafted free agent. He was waived on August 29, 2023.

=== St. Louis Battlehawks ===
On January 19, 2024, Kapp signed with the St. Louis Battlehawks of the United Football League (UFL). He re-signed with the team on August 6, 2024.

On April 9, 2025 Kapp was released by the Battlehawks, but was re-signed the next day.

=== Orlando Storm ===
On January 13, 2026, Kapp was selected by the Orlando Storm in the 2026 UFL Draft.
