= Darien Butler =

American football player (born 2000)

No. 10 – Orlando Storm
- Position: Linebacker
- Roster status: Active
- CFL status: American

Personal information
- Born: March 1, 2000 (age 26); Los Angeles, California, U.S.
- Listed height: 5 ft 10 in (1.78 m)
- Listed weight: 226 lb (103 kg)

Career information
- High school: Narbonne (Los Angeles)
- College: Arizona State (2018–2021)
- NFL draft: 2022: undrafted

Career history
- Las Vegas Raiders (2022–2023); Edmonton Elks (2025)*; Orlando Storm (2026–present)
- * Offseason or practice squad member only

Awards and highlights
- Second-team All-Pac-12 (2021)

Career NFL statistics as of 2023
- Total tackles: 11
- Stats at Pro Football Reference

Darien Butler (born March 1, 2000) is an American professional football linebacker for the Orlando Storm of the United Football League (UFL). He has previously played in the National Football League (NFL) for the Las Vegas Raiders. He played college football at Arizona State.

== Early life ==
Butler grew up in Compton, California and attended Narbonne High School.

== College career ==
Butler was a member of the Arizona State Sun Devils for four seasons. He was named a starter for ASU entering his freshman season. Butler finished his freshman season with 70 tackles and eight tackles for loss. He led the Sun Devils with 88 tackles as a sophomore. Butler started all four of Arizona State's games during the team's COVID-19-shortened 2020 season. He made 68 tackles during his senior season.

== Professional career ==
Pre-draft measurables
Height	Weight	Arm length	Hand span	Wingspan	Three-cone drill	Bench press
5 ft 10 1/8 in (1.78 m)	221 lb (100 kg)	30 1/8 in (0.77 m)	9 3/8 in (0.24 m)	6 ft 2 1/4 in (1.89 m)	7.47 s	19 reps
All values from NFL Combine/Pro Day

=== Las Vegas Raiders ===
Butler signed with the Las Vegas Raiders as an undrafted free agent on May 12, 2022. He made the Raiders' initial 53-man roster out of training camp.

On August 22, 2023, Butler was placed on injured reserve due to an undisclosed injury. Butler was waived on July 29, 2024, following a failed physical.

=== Edmonton Elks ===
On May 11, 2025, Butler signed with the Edmonton Elks of the Canadian Football League. He was placed on the suspended list on May 23, and did not appear for the team during the preseason. Butler was released by the Elks on August 13.

=== Orlando Storm ===
On January 14, 2026, Butler was selected by the Orlando Storm in the 2026 UFL Draft.
