= 2026 UFL season =

American football league season

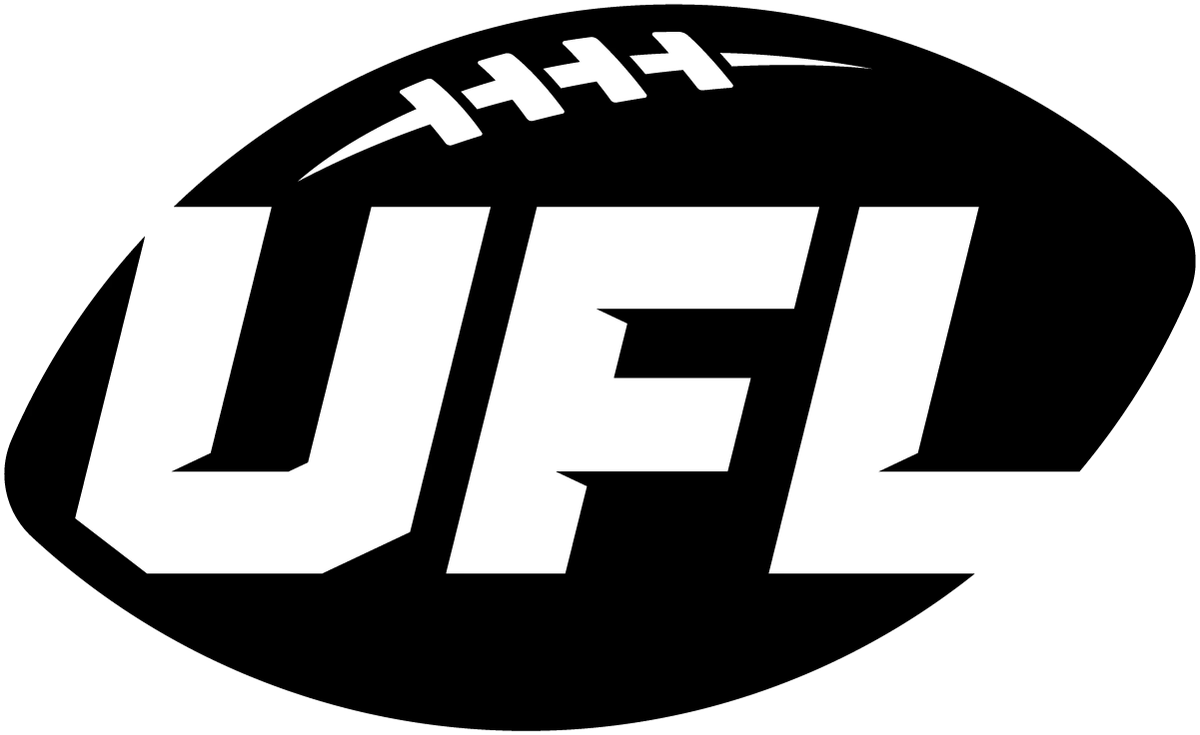
- League: United Football League
- Sport: American football
- Duration: Regular season: March 27 – May 31; Playoffs: June 7 – 13
- Games: 43 (40 regular season games, 3 postseason games)
- Teams: 8
- TV partner(s): ABC, ESPN, ESPN2, NFL Network, Fox, FS1
- Streaming partner(s): ESPN app, Fox One, DAZN

Draft
- Season MVP: Jack Plummer

Playoffs
- Semifinals champions: DC Defenders
- Semifinals runners-up: Orlando Storm
- Semifinals champions: Louisville Kings
- Semifinals runners-up: St. Louis Battlehawks

2026 United Bowl
- Venue: Audi Field, Washington, D.C.
- Champions: Louisville Kings
- Runners-up: DC Defenders
- Finals MVP: Ian Wheeler

Seasons
- ← 2025 2027 →

The 2026 UFL season was the third season of the United Football League.

== Offseason ==
In July 2025, the UFL sold a large minority stake to their own self over to the Impact Capital, a private equity fund owned by multibillionaire sports drink founder Mike Repole, who assumed direction of the league's business operations.

Even before Repole's management had been made public, news broke that the entire USFL Conference was being potentially shopped for relocation to potential expansion markets, due to a number of factors: Birmingham and Houston due to declining and underperforming attendance; Memphis due to even worse attendance and the death of team sponsor Fred Smith; and Michigan due to exorbitant stadium costs at Ford Field and an unwillingness to use the only other viable stadium in the Detroit market, Rynearson Stadium (though later reports suggested that the Panthers' future could be tied to AlumniFi Field, a planned 15,000-seat stadium scheduled to open in southwest Detroit in 2027 as the new home of soccer's Detroit City FC).

Repole first addressed the Birmingham Stallions by challenging the Stallions fan base to purchase 5,000 season ticket deposits in order to keep the team in Alabama; though the drive fell short of that number, Repole was impressed by the speed in which the city had invested in 2,200 season tickets and a corporate suite that had not yet even been put up for sale and confirmed the Stallions were safe from relocation for 2026, but he hoped the city would purchase 15,000 to 20,000 tickets per game for the upcoming season to continue beyond that. Repole's overall target for attendance across the league is between 10,000 and 15,000 fans per game, compensating by using smaller, more intimate stadiums that would avoid the empty seats and lack of ambiance that Repole felt made the games feel like "a COVID game."

Among potential relocation targets, Columbus, Ohio had been named as a potential new 2026 market for the UFL as early as April 2025. The UFL confirmed the addition of a Columbus UFL team shortly after Repole's arrival. Other possible candidates for relocation for the 2026 season were identified in the offseason including Louisville, Kentucky at Lynn Family Stadium. Boise, Idaho and Lexington, Kentucky were identified in early reporting but they either denied having heard from the league or stated they could not host games in 2026. Boise had reached a "verbal agreement" with the previous UFL management for a team to play at Albertsons Stadium, one that was suddenly abandoned upon Repole's arrival.

Though the UFL had initially planned to expand to 10 teams for 2026, Repole paused those plans and chose to keep the league at eight teams for 2026, with intent to begin the oft-delayed expansion by 2028 and have a 16-team league by 2035. The first of the two new teams for 2028 was revealed during the 2026 season, an Oklahoma City team that will play at MAPS 4 Stadium once it is complete.

On October 7 the UFL announced three new franchises, the Columbus Aviators playing at Historic Crew Stadium in Columbus, Ohio; The Louisville Kings playing at Lynn Family Stadium in Louisville, Kentucky; and the Orlando Storm playing at Inter&Co Stadium in Orlando, Florida. The league also announced that the Arlington Renegades would become the Dallas Renegades and play at Toyota Stadium in Frisco, Texas; and that the Houston Roughnecks would become the Houston Gamblers and move to Shell Energy Stadium. It was also announced that new head coaches, uniforms and the 2026 schedule would be announced at a later date.

Players under contract to the Michigan Panthers, Memphis Showboats and San Antonio Brahmas were all transferred over to the Columbus Aviators, Louisville Kings and Orlando Storm, respectively, for the purposes of protecting players in the subsequent dispersal draft. However, the brand new teams are considered separate and will not inherit the history or records of the folded franchises.

== Teams ==
=== Relocations and rebrandings ===
==== Returning unchanged ====
- Birmingham Stallions
- DC Defenders
- St. Louis Battlehawks

==== New teams ====
- Columbus Aviators
- Louisville Kings
- Orlando Storm

==== Rebranding teams ====
- Arlington Renegades → Dallas Renegades
- Houston Roughnecks→ Houston Gamblers

==== Not returning from 2025 ====
- Memphis Showboats
- Michigan Panthers
- San Antonio Brahmas

Teams in the 2026 UFL season
Team	Location	Stadium	Capacity	Head coach
Birmingham Stallions	Birmingham, Alabama	Protective Stadium	47,100	A. J. McCarron
Columbus Aviators	Columbus, Ohio	Historic Crew Stadium	19,968	Ted Ginn Jr.
Dallas Renegades	Frisco, Texas	Toyota Stadium	11,000	Rick Neuheisel
DC Defenders	Washington, D.C.	Audi Field	20,000	Shannon Harris
Houston Gamblers	Houston, Texas	Shell Energy Stadium	22,039	Kevin Sumlin
Louisville Kings	Louisville, Kentucky	Lynn Family Stadium	11,700	Chris Redman
Orlando Storm	Orlando, Florida	Inter&Co Stadium	25,500	Anthony Becht
St. Louis Battlehawks	St. Louis, Missouri	The Dome at America's Center	67,277	Ricky Proehl

Locations of current teams for the 2026 UFL season.

== Players ==
In November 2025, Repole revealed in an interview that each team will carry 60-man rosters to training camp (compared to 75 in the 2024 season and 64 in the 2025 season), with regular season rosters set at 45 (down from 50 in the 2025 season) without specifying how many will be on the game day roster and if the teams will carry practice squads. This would violate the terms of the CBA as negotiated in 2025. It was later announced that teams would be able to carry an offseason roster of a 60 (minimum) to 64 (maximum) players.

=== Unionization and compensation ===
This is the second and final year of the UFL's collective bargaining agreement with the United Football Players Association. Under the agreement, player minimum salaries will be set at $6,400 per game, with each player also receiving seven months of health insurance and access to year-round coverage under COBRA. UFL players will also be entitled for "players accolade bonuses" for Player of the week ($1,000), Player of the year ($5,000), and MVP ($7,500), with winners of the 2026 UFL Championship Game winning a $5,000 per-player bonus.

=== Player movement ===
==== Free agency ====
Beginning in the 2025–26 offseason, UFL players who have accrued two years under contract to the same team were allowed to test free agency, although none of that happened since the league decided to reallocate all players through the multi-phase leaguewide draft.

==== Draft ====
Previous plans to hold the draft in September 2025 fell through due to continued uncertainty about team composition. The delay in the draft from its previous scheduling in July was in part because a large number of the players who were drafted in 2024 (including first overall selection Jason Bean) had opted to remain in the NFL, prompting the league to place its draft after NFL preseason cuts and practice squad assignments to better assess who will be available.

In an unanticipated move, Repole planned to liquidate all eight rosters and will redistribute players currently under UFL contracts in a process similar to the 2020 and 2023 XFL drafts, with no way for current coaches to protect their existing talent. Birmingham quarterback J'Mar Smith quit the league in protest of this decision and leaked the news of Repole's plans to the press. When plans were finalized, the surviving teams were given permission to protect up to 12 players from their 2025 rosters.

The 2026 UFL draft was held from January 9–14, 2026, at UFL HQ in Arlington, Texas.

==== Trades ====
On February 11, 2026, the Columbus Aviators traded TE Briley Moore to the DC Defenders for DT Patrick Jenkins.

On March 14, 2026, the DC Defenders traded OT Gottlieb Ayedze to the Houston Gamblers for WR Braylon Sanders.

On April 19, 2026, the DC Defenders traded QB Mike DiLiello to the Louisville Kings for QB Jason Bean.

On April 19, 2026, the Birmingham Stallions traded QB Matt Corral and DE Amani Bledsoe to the Orlando Storm for QB Dorian Thompson-Robinson.

On April 21, 2026, the Dallas Renegades traded QB Luis Perez to the St. Louis Battlehawks for OT Corey Stewart.

On May 4, 2026, the Houston Gamblers traded DE Lonnie Phelps to the Louisville Kings for WR JaVonta Payton.

== Coaches ==
After initially implying that he would be joining the Tennessee State Tigers staff and leaving his position as interim head coach, Shannon Harris agreed to stay on as the DC Defenders' head coach on a permanent basis. He will work both jobs for their upcoming seasons. He will be the only head coach returning with the same team he had coached in 2025.

Of the three coaches of teams who were relocated, Michigan's Mike Nolan was formally terminated November 15; San Antonio's Wade Phillips had reached the end of his contract (he had not taken any action on an offer to return to the UFL before Repole's arrival); and Memphis's Jim Turner accepted a position as offensive line coach with Rutgers on December 22. Payton Pardee, who had served as the interim coach of San Antonio during Phillips's illness in 2025, joined UTEP as its tight ends coach in January 2026.

For the 2026 season the UFL signed all coaches to a year long contract, instead of the seasonal contracts they used in previous years.

Team	Departing coach	Incoming coach	Reason for leaving	Notes
Columbus Aviators	—N/a	Ted Ginn Jr. Todd Haley (week 3)	—N/a	Ginn has never held a coaching position at any level. He had spent 14 seasons as a journeyman wide receiver in the National Football League. Ginn was suspended on April 11 following an arrest for driving under the influence. Haley, the team's offensive coordinator who had previously coached the USFL's Tampa Bay Bandits, was named interim head coach for the team's April 12 contest. Ginn was reinstated April 14.
Louisville Kings	—N/a	Chris Redman	—N/a	Redman spent 9 seasons as a backup quarterback in the National Football League; his only coaching experience prior to this was as an assistant at the high school level.
Orlando Storm	—N/a	Anthony Becht	Reassigned	Becht had accrued a record of 22–10 (.688) in his three years coaching the Battlehawks, having the league's best record in 2025 but failing to win any postseason games. He was reassigned to Orlando on December 23, 2025, a position that brings him closer to his home in central Florida. Proehl had most recently been the Battlehawks' wide receivers coach in 2023.
St. Louis Battlehawks	Anthony Becht	Ricky Proehl	Reassigned	Becht had accrued a record of 22–10 (.688) in his three years coaching the Battlehawks, having the league's best record in 2025 but failing to win any postseason games. He was reassigned to Orlando on December 23, 2025, a position that brings him closer to his home in central Florida. Proehl had most recently been the Battlehawks' wide receivers coach in 2023.
Houston Gamblers	Curtis Johnson	Kevin Sumlin	Fired	Johnson had spent three seasons as Houston's head coach, accruing a record of 11–19 (.367) and no playoff appearances. He was fired November 29 as part of Repole's internal overhaul. Sumlin returns to the Gamblers after coaching the team during its inaugural season in 2022. In the interim, he had been assistant head coach at Maryland in 2023 and 2024.
Dallas Renegades	Bob Stoops	Rick Neuheisel	Retired	Stoops was the first head coach to be hired in either of the UFL's predecessors and had been the only coach in the Renegades' history. He accrued a record of 16–21 (.432) over the course of 3½ seasons in the XFL and UFL, including an XFL Championship in 2023. He announced his retirement from football on December 15, 2025. Neuheisel was previously the head coach at Colorado, Washington, UCLA and the Arizona Hotshots of the Alliance of American Football. He has a career record of 87-59 in college football and a 5-3 record as head coach of the Arizona Hotshots.
Birmingham Stallions	Skip Holtz	A. J. McCarron	Stepped Down	Holtz, the winningest coach in UFL history with three league championships and a 39–8 (.830) record in four years as coach of the Stallions, announced that he would not be returning as the Stallions' head coach on December 16, 2025, a move that Holtz stated was "not retiring" and a "pause" while he pursued other opportunities. Holtz's father Lou Holtz entered end-of-life care shortly after the announcement, prompting the younger Holtz to devote much of his time to the elder's care. The elder Holtz eventually died March 4, 2026. McCarron was most recently the starting quarterback for the St. Louis Battlehawks in the 2023 and 2024 seasons; he had spent 2025 out of football after an attempt to sign with the San Antonio Brahmas was nixed by the Brahmas general manager. At the time of his acceptance of the Stallions position, he had been the frontrunner candidate in the Lieutenant Governor of Alabama race for 2026; McCarron withdrew his candidacy the day after Holtz's exit and was formally announced as coach the day after that. His experience as a coach had theretofore been limited to youth-level flag football.

== Rule changes ==
On February 24, 2026, the UFL announced a series of rule changes for 2026 meant to "turbocharge offenses" and increase player safety. The changes include the following:

Standard play

- A coin toss will be used before the start of the game and, if necessary, overtime, with the visiting team making the call and the winner making the choice to receive, kick off, defend goal, or defer to the second half. The UFL (and before it the XFL) had previously given all privileges of what a coin toss winner would receive to the home team as a home-field advantage, replacing the original XFL's ill-fated "opening scramble."
- Only one foot will be required to land in-bounds for a forward pass to be deemed complete. (This restores the XFL standard, which Daryl Johnston had vigorously opposed before his dismissal.)
- The tush push, defined by the UFL as "a play in which, after the quarterback takes the snap, he immediately drives forward as the offensive line surges and is assisted by additional players behind him who physically push him forward into the surging offensive line", is prohibited.
- The UFL will return to the standard used in all other levels of the game that limits the distance of a penalty to up to half the distance to the goal.

Kickoffs

- A minor adjustment to the "dynamic kickoff" will move each team's line five yards toward the kicker. This means that the kicking team's lineup will move from the receiving team's 40-yard line to the 45 (with the kicker at their own 30), while the receiving team must have at least 9 players lined up between their 35- and 40-yard lines (previously their 30- and 35-yard lines).
- If a ball is kicked into the end zone and results in a touchback, the ball will be placed at the receiving team's 40-yard line as consequence. (The ball had previously been placed at the 35-yard line.)
- If a kick lands within the "receiving zone" (between the receiving team's goal line and 20-yard line) but travels into the end zone without a return, the ball will be placed at the receiving team's 20-yard line.

Punts

- Teams on offense will be forbidden from punting if they cross midfield except after a two-minute warning; they will only be permitted to punt if the scrimmage line is at or on their side of the 50-yard line.
- The punt prohibition will stand even if the offense loses ground after crossing midfield, meaning the team cannot take intentional penalties, sacks, or kneels to become eligible to punt, and must attempt to achieve the first down or attempt a four-point field goal by placekick or drop kick (see below).

Scoring

- Midfield will now serve as a "four-point line" for field goal attempts, with any field goal of 60 or more yards earning four points instead of three. Made directly at Repole's behest, this rule is a revival and modification of one used by NFL Europe, which had awarded four points to field goals of 50 or more yards. Eight such field goals would eventually be scored in 2026, four in the regular season: two by DC's Matt McCrane, one by Louisville's Tanner Brown, and one by Columbus's Jonah Dalmas. McCrane and Brown would each kick two additional four-pointers during the playoffs.
- After a touchdown, offenses will have the option to kick an extra point, with the 33-yard distance for such kick attempts matching the NFL standard. Teams will also have an option to run a play from the 2-yard line for a 2-point conversion, or run a play from the 8-yard line for 3 points. The new 1- and 2-point options match the equivalents used in the NFL. Previously, the UFL did not permit kicks for 1 point, and teams were required to run or pass from the 2-, 5-, or 10-yard lines for 1, 2, or 3 points respectively. This reverts to the USFL rule; the previous UFL rule had been inherited from the XFL.

Overtime

- Overtime will retain its best-of-three-session "shootout" format, with teams alternating scrimmage plays from the 5-yard line and earning 2 points for each scoring play; sudden-death sessions will also be played to determine a winner if the teams remain tied after three sessions.
- In a change announced before Week 4, a rule that awarded an automatic two points to the offense when the defense commits two nonconsecutive live-ball penalties in overtime was repealed. The rarely-employed rule, which was originally intended to discourage defenses from intentionally preventing OT scores (and also help ensure a timely end to the game), was invoked during the Week 3 Orlando/Louisville matchup, after the Kings committed a holding penalty on the Storm's fourth OT attempt; that penalty, when combined with a Louisville pass interference foul in the third OT session, gave Orlando two points and the win. Beginning in Week 4, a graduated scale will determine placement of the ball after each defensive live-ball foul: The first penalty, as before, will give the offense a retry from the 1-yard line, but any subsequent live-ball foul by the same defense will see the offense attempt the retry from halfway closer to the goal line (i.e. the half-yard line after the second foul, nine-inch line after the third, 4.5-inch line after the fourth, and so on if necessary). The change, while continuing to disincentivize defensive OT penalties, ensures that the OT cannot end on a penalty. (The unfair act rule that awards a score for consecutive fouls in an attempt to prevent a score remains on the books.)

== Season structure ==
=== Preseason ===
This is the fourth year of the league's agreement with Arlington, Texas, to serve as the league's centralized hub. Repole indicated that the hub model would be continuing for 2026 but that time in individual markets would be increased (he mentioned potential two- to three-day stays during game weeks and ten-day stays when teams play back-to-back home games) so that teams can build followings in their home cities.

=== Regular season ===
The UFL continued to follow its model of a ten-week regular season in 2026, but moved from a two-conference structure of 4 teams each to a single-table standings format featuring all 8 teams. The scheduling formula used by all of the eight-team spring leagues of the 21st century have all relied on two four-team divisions to ensure an even schedule of playing each division rival home and away and the other division teams once; because Repole rejected this model, the final schedule, other than there being five home and away games for each team, has no clear regularity in which opponents play how many times.

In a late August 2025 interview, Repole indicated that the season would likely run from the weekend of "March 1 through the end of June." This would have been four weeks earlier than previous years and closer to the XFL's post-Super Bowl window. Repole reversed this and stated that the season would again start on the last Friday in March as the previous two seasons had (which, for 2026, lands on March 27), but that a move to the post-Super Bowl window was being considered for 2027.

=== Postseason ===
The top four teams in the UFL standings were seeded in order of record in the league semifinals (1st place team playing 4th place, 2nd versus 3rd), with the winners advancing to the 2026 United Bowl, the league's championship game. Due to schedule conflicts at Inter&Co Stadium, and with other stadiums in the immediate Orlando area also unavailable, the Orlando Storm were forced to find another venue to host their home game; after it was initially announced that the game would be held at a neutral site (in Columbus), the Storm announced on June 1 that Daytona Municipal Stadium had agreed to host the Storm's playoff game.

== Standings ==
2026 UFL standings
Team	W	L	PCT	GB	TD+/-	TD+	TD-	PF	PA	DIFF	STK
(y) Orlando Storm	8	2	.800	–	9	26	17	232	186	46	W4
(x) St. Louis Battlehawks	6	4	.600	2	-2	21	23	212	197	15	L1
(x) Louisville Kings	6	4	.600	2	1	27	26	265	219	46	W4
(x) DC Defenders	5	5	.500	3	6	31	25	281	224	57	L4
(e) Dallas Renegades	4	6	.400	4	2	30	28	224	259	-35	W1
(e) Birmingham Stallions	4	6	.400	4	-1	24	25	190	229	-39	L2
(e) Houston Gamblers	4	6	.400	4	-6	20	26	189	236	-60	W1
(e) Columbus Aviators	3	7	.300	5	-6	27	33	216	259	-43	L1
(x)–clinched playoff berth; (y)–clinched conference; (e)–eliminated from playoff contention

== Season schedule ==
All games stream on ESPN+ or Fox Sports app unless otherwise noted.

=== Regular season ===
==== Week 1 ====
Date	Time	Away team	Result		Home team	Stadium	Attendance	Broadcast	Viewership (millions)	Rating	Refs
March 27	8:00 p.m. ET	Birmingham Stallions	15	13	Louisville Kings	Lynn Family Stadium	14,034	Fox	0.65	0.7	
March 28	12:00 p.m. ET	DC Defenders	10	16	St. Louis Battlehawks	The Dome at America's Center	31,191	ESPN	0.94	0.9	
March 28	4:00 p.m. ET	Houston Gamblers	17	36	Dallas Renegades	Toyota Stadium	8,870	Fox	0.65	0.7	
March 29	8:00 p.m. ET	Columbus Aviators	16	23	Orlando Storm	Inter&Co Stadium	11,127	ESPN	0.47	0.5	

==== Week 2 ====
Date	Time	Away team	Result		Home team	Stadium	Attendance	Broadcast	Viewership (millions)	Rating	Refs
April 3	8:00 p.m. ET	DC Defenders	44	26	Columbus Aviators	Historic Crew Stadium	14,810	Fox	0.65	0.7	
April 4	8:00 p.m. ET	Louisville Kings	9	19	Orlando Storm	Inter&Co Stadium	8,585	ESPN	0.29	0.3	
April 5	6:00 p.m. ET	Birmingham Stallions	20	22	Houston Gamblers	Shell Energy Stadium	7,744	NFL Network	0.17	0.2	
April 7	8:00 p.m. ET	St. Louis Battlehawks	15	31	Dallas Renegades	Toyota Stadium	5,799	FS1	0.16	0.2	

==== Week 3 ====
Date	Time	Away team	Result		Home team	Stadium	Attendance	Broadcast	Viewership (millions)	Rating	Refs
April 10	8:00 p.m. ET	Orlando Storm	29 (OT)	27	Louisville Kings	Lynn Family Stadium	11,082	Fox	0.67	0.7	
April 11	12:00 p.m. ET	Houston Gamblers	7	45	DC Defenders	Audi Field	12,167	ESPN	0.66	0.7	
April 12	12:00 p.m. ET	Columbus Aviators	23	28	Dallas Renegades	Toyota Stadium	5,133	ABC	0.97	1.0	
April 12	3:00 p.m. ET	Birmingham Stallions	30	34	St. Louis Battlehawks	The Dome at America's Center	20,209	ABC	1.01	1.0	

==== Week 4 ====
Date	Time	Away team	Result		Home team	Stadium	Attendance	Broadcast	Viewership (millions)	Rating	Refs
April 16	8:00 p.m. ET	Louisville Kings	24 (OT)	22	Houston Gamblers	Shell Energy Stadium	4,880	NFL Network	0.15	0.2	
April 17	8:00 p.m. ET	Dallas Renegades	14	28	Columbus Aviators	Historic Crew Stadium	8,729	Fox	0.68	0.7	
April 18	12:30 p.m. ET	St. Louis Battlehawks	22	28	DC Defenders	Audi Field	7,940	ABC	N/A	N/A	
April 18	4:00 p.m. ET	Orlando Storm	16	0	Birmingham Stallions	Protective Stadium	18,340	Fox	N/A	N/A	

==== Week 5 ====
Date	Time	Away team	Result		Home team	Stadium	Attendance	Broadcast	Viewership (millions)	Rating	Refs
April 24	8:00 p.m. ET	DC Defenders	45	28	Birmingham Stallions	Protective Stadium	8,120	Fox	0.53	0.5	
April 25	7:00 p.m. ET	St. Louis Battlehawks	25	17	Orlando Storm	Inter&Co Stadium	9,735	ESPN	0.56	0.6	
April 26	12:00 p.m. ET	Columbus Aviators	13	17	Houston Gamblers	Shell Energy Stadium	5,166	ABC	N/A	N/A	
April 26	3:00 p.m. ET	Louisville Kings	47	25	Dallas Renegades	Toyota Stadium	7,123	ABC	N/A	N/A	

==== Week 6 ====
Date	Time	Away team	Result		Home team	Stadium	Attendance	Broadcast	Viewership (millions)	Rating	Refs
April 30	8:00 p.m. ET	St. Louis Battlehawks	16	3	Louisville Kings	Lynn Family Stadium	10,456	FS1	0.12	0.1	
May 1	8:00 p.m. ET	Houston Gamblers	17	24	Columbus Aviators	Historic Crew Stadium	8,347	Fox	0.65	0.7	
May 2	12:00 p.m. ET	Dallas Renegades	6	24	DC Defenders	Audi Field	7,019	ABC	1.05	1.1	
May 3	4:00 p.m. ET	Birmingham Stallions	20	17	Orlando Storm	Inter&Co Stadium	9,107	Fox	N/A	N/A	

==== Week 7 ====
Date	Time	Away team	Result		Home team	Stadium	Attendance	Broadcast	Viewership (millions)	Rating	Refs
May 8	8:00 p.m. ET	Columbus Aviators	20	31	St. Louis Battlehawks	The Dome at America's Center	18,563	Fox	0.68	0.7	
May 9	1:30 p.m. ET	Louisville Kings	30	13	DC Defenders	Audi Field	7,950	Fox	N/A	N/A	
May 9	8:00 p.m. ET	Dallas Renegades	17	21 (OT)	Birmingham Stallions	Protective Stadium	4,705	ESPN	0.38	0.4	
May 10	6:00 p.m. ET	Orlando Storm	24	23	Houston Gamblers	Shell Energy Stadium	4,409	FS1	0.48	0.5	

==== Week 8 ====
Date	Time	Away team	Result		Home team	Stadium	Attendance	Broadcast	Viewership (millions)	Rating	Refs
May 15	8:00 p.m. ET	Orlando Storm	31	24	Dallas Renegades	Phantom Warrior Stadium (Note: The May 15 Storm/Renegades game, billed as Hats Off to Heroes, was held at a stadium on the campus of Fort Hood, an active U.S. Army base in North Texas; the game was closed to the general public, with attendance limited to personnel stationed at the fort and family members with authorized access thereto.)	4,001	Fox	0.61	0.6	
May 16	12:00 p.m. ET	DC Defenders	30	33	Louisville Kings	Lynn Family Stadium	10,025	ABC	0.85	0.9	
May 16	3:00 p.m. ET	Houston Gamblers	23	16	St. Louis Battlehawks	The Dome at America's Center	21,609	ABC	0.95	1.0	
May 17	1:00 p.m. ET	Columbus Aviators	3	14	Birmingham Stallions	Protective Stadium	4,824	Fox	N/A	N/A	

==== Week 9 ====
Date	Time	Away team	Result		Home team	Stadium	Attendance	Broadcast	Viewership (millions)	Rating	Refs
May 22	8:00 p.m. ET	DC Defenders	19	27	Orlando Storm	Inter&Co Stadium	10,465	Fox	0.54	0.5	
May 23	3:00 p.m. ET	Birmingham Stallions	29	36	Columbus Aviators	Historic Crew Stadium	9,217	ABC	1.05	1.0	
May 24	4:00 p.m. ET	Dallas Renegades	23	37	Louisville Kings	Lynn Family Stadium	10,378	Fox	1.59	1.6	
May 24	7:00 p.m. ET	St. Louis Battlehawks	21	15	Houston Gamblers	Shell Energy Stadium	6,217	ESPN2	0.29	0.3	

==== Week 10 ====
Date	Time	Away team	Result		Home team	Stadium	Attendance	Broadcast	Viewership (millions)	Rating	Refs
May 29	8:00 p.m. ET	Dallas Renegades	20	16	St. Louis Battlehawks	The Dome at America's Center	24,621	Fox	0.67	0.7	
May 30	3:00 p.m. ET	Houston Gamblers	26	13	Birmingham Stallions	Protective Stadium	5,253	ESPN2	N/A	N/A	
May 31	12:00 p.m. ET	Orlando Storm	29	23	DC Defenders	Audi Field	9,924	ABC	N/A	N/A	
May 31	6:00 p.m. ET	Louisville Kings	42	27	Columbus Aviators	Historic Crew Stadium	10,705	Fox	0.65	0.7	

=== Postseason ===
The playoffs started on June 7 and ended with the United Bowl on June 13.

Semifinals; June 7, 2026
1	Orlando Storm	22
4	DC Defenders	28
2	St. Louis Battlehawks	20
3	Louisville Kings	29

United Bowl; June 13, 2026
4	DC Defenders	20
3	Louisville Kings	27

==== Semifinals ====
Date	Time	Away team	Result		Home team	Stadium	Attendance	Broadcast	Viewership (millions)	Rating	Refs
June 7	3:00 p.m. ET	DC Defenders	28	22	Orlando Storm	Daytona Stadium	6,317	ABC	N/A	N/A	
June 7	6:00 p.m. ET	Louisville Kings	29	20	St. Louis Battlehawks	The Dome at America's Center	18,111	Fox	1.07	1.1	

==== 2026 United Bowl ====
Date	Time	Away team	Result		Home team	Stadium	Attendance	Broadcast	Viewership (millions)	Rating	Refs
June 13	3:00 p.m. ET	DC Defenders	20	27	Louisville Kings	Audi Field	19,023	ABC	0.99	1.0	

== Attendance ==
Announced attendance figures for each home game. In the weekly columns, dashes (—) indicate away games, while bold font indicates the highest attendance of the week.

Team / Week	1	2	3	4	5	6	7	8	9	10	Semifinals	Championship	Total	Average
**Birmingham Stallions**	—	—	—	**18,340**	8,120	—	4,705	4,824	—	5,253	—N/a	—N/a	41,242	**8,248**
**Columbus Aviators**	—	**14,810**	—	8,729	—	8,347	—	—	9,217	10,705	—N/a	—N/a	51,808	**10,362**
**Dallas Renegades**	8,870	5,799	5,133	—	7,123	—	—	5,321	—	—	—N/a	—N/a	32,246	**6,449**
**DC Defenders**	—	—	12,167	7,940	—	7,019	7,950	—	—	9,924	—	—	45,000	**9,000**
**Houston Gamblers**	—	7,744	—	4,880	5,166	—	4,409	—	6,217	—	—N/a	—N/a	28,416	**5,683**
**Louisville Kings**	14,034	—	11,082	—	—	**10,456**	—	10,025	10,378	—	—	**19,023** (Note: Neutral site game at Audi Field)	55,975	**11,195**
**Orlando Storm**	11,127	8,585	—	—	**9,735**	9,107	—	—	**10,594**	—	6,317	—N/a	55,465	**9,244**
**St. Louis Battlehawks**	**31,191**	—	**20,209**	—	—	—	**18,563**	**21,609**	—	**24,621**	**18,111**	—N/a	134,304	**22,384**
Total	65,222	36,938	48,591	39,889	30,144	34,929	35,627	41,779	36,406	50,503	24,428	19,023	463,482	
Average	16,306	9,235	12,148	9,872	7,536	8,732	8,907	10,394	9,013	12,626	12,214	19,023		10,779

== Awards ==
=== Players of the week ===
Week	Offensive Player			Defensive Player			Special Teams Player			Refs.
Week	Player	Pos.	Team	Player	Pos.	Team	Player	Pos.	Team	Refs.
1	Austin Reed	QB	Renegades	Jordan Mosley	S	Battlehawks	Matt McCrane	K	Defenders	
2	Nolan Henderson	QB	Gamblers	Sam Kidd	S	Defenders	John Hoyland	K	Gamblers	
3	Hakeem Butler	WR	Battlehawks	Derick Roberson	DE	Defenders	Jaden Shirden	RB	Kings	
4	Jordan Ta'amu	QB	Defenders	Cam Gill	LB	Kings	Tanner Brown	K	Kings	
5	Jordan Ta'amu (2)	QB	Defenders	Tony Fields II	LB	Aviators	Quindell Johnson	S	Kings	
6	Justyn Ross	WR	Stallions	Travis Feeney	LB	Battlehawks	Ryan Sanborn	P	Battlehawks	
7	Elijhah Badger	WR	Storm	Jordan Mosley (2)	S	Battlehawks	Colby Wadman	P	Stallions	
8	Jack Plummer	QB	Storm	Tae Crowder	LB	Stallions	Tanner Brown (2)	K	Kings	
9	Jalen Morton	QB	Aviators	Darien Butler	LB	Storm	Tanner Brown (3)	K	Kings	
10	Marcus Major	RB	Gamblers	Kana'i Mauga	LB	Storm	Jonah Dalmas	K	Aviators	
10	Marcus Major	RB	Gamblers	Kana'i Mauga	LB	Storm	Jerome Kapp	WR	Storm	

=== Season awards ===
Individual Awards
Award	Winner	Position	Team	Ref.
Most Valuable Player	Jack Plummer	QB	Storm	
Offensive Player of the Year	Hakeem Butler	WR	Battlehawks	
Defensive Player of the Year	Cam Gill	EDGE	Kings	
Special Teams Player of the Year	Tanner Brown	K	Kings	
Sportsman of the Year	Cornell Powell	WR	Defenders	
Coach of the Year	Anthony Becht	HC	Storm	
Assistant Coach of the Year	Corey Chamblin	DC	Battlehawks	

All-UFL Team
Position	Player	Team
QB	Jack Plummer	Storm
RB	Deon Jackson	Defenders
WR	Hakeem Butler	Battlehawks
WR	Chris Rowland	Storm
WR	Tyler Vaughns	Renegades
TE	Tyler Neville	Battlehawks
OT	Gottlieb Ayedze	Gamblers
OT	Yasir Durant	Defenders
OG	Michael Gonzalez	Storm
OG	Gareth Warren	Gamblers
C	Mike Panasiuk	Battlehawks
DT	Isaiah Buggs	Storm
DT	Carlos Davis	Battlehawks
EDGE	Cam Gill	Kings
EDGE	Derick Roberson	Defenders
LB	Tae Crowder	Stallions
LB	Tony Fields II	Aviators
LB	Kyahva Tezino	Stallions
DB	Major Burns	Gamblers
DB	D.J. Miller Jr.	Aviators
DB	Corey Mayfield Jr.	Kings
DB	Kary Vincent Jr.	Gamblers
K	Tanner Brown	Kings
P	Ryan Sanborn	Battlehawks
LS	Marco Ortiz	Gamblers
KR	Chris Rowland	Storm
PR	Sean Fresch	Battlehawks
CS	Gary Jennings Jr.	Battlehawks

== League finances ==
=== Personnel ===
- Dany Garcia: Chairperson
- Mike Repole: Director of business operations
- Russ Brandon: President, CEO, and Executive of Football Operations
- Doug Whaley: Senior Vice President of Player Personnel
- Russ Giglio: Senior Director, Player Administration and Officiating Operations
- Jim Popp: Director of Player Administration
- Dr. Damond Blueitt: Medical Director

== Media ==
=== Television ===
In the United States, the television rights for the UFL are being held by ESPN in now the fourth season of a five-year deal, and league co-owner Fox. For the first time, two games will also air on NFL Network (they were originally planned to stream on the ESPN app), which has been owned by ESPN since January 2026.

==== Broadcasters ====
ESPN will use the same commentary teams as they used in the 2025 season, with the additions of Brock Osweiler and Max Browne as their flex analysts. Tyler Fulghum and Pamela Maldonado will serve as the network's betting analysts, replacing Erin Dolan. Fox Sports will likewise carry over most of the same on-air talent as previous years, including lead team of Curt Menefee and Joel Klatt.

==== Viewership ====
Through the first five weeks of the 2026 season, the UFL posted modest gains in viewership of 3% compared to 2025, due in part to changes in methodology of calculating Nielsen Ratings. Fox's ratings were unchanged compared to 2026, while ESPN showed substantial gains.

In millions of viewers

Broadcaster	1	2	3	4	5	6	7	8	9	10	Conference finals	Championship game	Total	Average
ABC	–	–	1.0	0.0	0.0	1.1	–	0.9	1.1	0.0	0.0	1.0	3.1	0.5
ABC	–	–	1.0	–	0.0	–	–	1.0	–	–	–	–	3.1	0.5
ESPN	0.9	0.3	0.7	–	0.6	–	0.4	–	–	–	–	–	3.0	0.6
ESPN	0.5	–	–	–	–	–	–	–	–	–	–	–	3.0	0.6
ESPN2	–	–	–	–	–	–	–	–	0.3	0.0	–	–	0.3	0.3
NFL Network	–	0.2	–	0.2	–	–	–	–	–	–	–	–	0.4	0.2
Fox	0.7	0.7	0.7	0.7	0.5	0.7	0.7	0.6	1.6	0.0	1.1	–	4.7	0.5
Fox	0.7	–	–	0.0	–	0.0	0.0	0.0	0.5	0.0	–	–	4.7	0.5
FS1	–	0.2	–	–	–	0.1	0.5	–	–	–	–	–	0.3	0.2
Total	2.8	1.4	3.4	0.9	1.1	1.9	1.6	2.5	3.5	0.0	1.1	1.0	21.2	
Average	0.7	0.4	0.9	0.2	0.3	0.5	0.4	0.6	0.9	0.0	1.1	1.0		0.5

* One decimal place is shown in table but two decimal places are used in all calculations.
* Viewership figures for games streaming on ESPN+ were not released.

== Reception ==
Writing for The Courier-Journal, C. L. Brown gave the revamped league a positive review, remarking that "there's real talent here" and that there was "nothing gimmicky about" the overall product despite the rule changes; he also noted that the brisk weather gave the game an authentic autumn-like feel.

== Signees to the NFL ==
75 players from the 2026 UFL season signed with NFL teams following the United Bowl, with two such players—Ameer Speed and Tay Martin—making the Opening Day active roster and 43 others making a practice squad.

Legend
	Made an NFL team (active, practice squad or PUP)
**Bold**	Made the active roster
Italics	Made NFL Team but was later cut

Player	Position	UFL team	NFL team	Ref.
Eugene Asante	LB	Houston Gamblers	Arizona Cardinals	
Shawn Bowman	TE	Orlando Storm	Arizona Cardinals	
Jack Browning	P	Orlando Storm	Arizona Cardinals	
Baylor Cupp	TE	Dallas Renegades	Arizona Cardinals	
Josh Minkins	S	Orlando Storm	Arizona Cardinals	
Quinton Newsome	CB	Houston Gamblers	Arizona Cardinals	
Tre Stewart	RB	Orlando Storm	Arizona Cardinals	
Keshawn Banks	DE	Orlando Storm	Atlanta Falcons	
Devonnsha Maxwell	DT	DC Defenders	Atlanta Falcons	
Antwane Wells Jr.	WR	Columbus Aviators	Atlanta Falcons	
Michael Barrett	LB	St. Louis Battlehawks	Baltimore Ravens	
Austin Reed	QB	Dallas Renegades	Baltimore Ravens	
Sincere Haynesworth	C	St. Louis Battlehawks	Buffalo Bills	
D.J. Miller Jr.	CB	Columbus Aviators	Buffalo Bills	
Ian Wheeler	RB	Louisville Kings	Buffalo Bills	
Kyon Barrs	DT	Houston Gamblers	Carolina Panthers	
Elijah Cooks	WR	Birmingham Stallions	Carolina Panthers	
Cam Gill	LB	Louisville Kings	Carolina Panthers	
Roc Taylor	WR	Columbus Aviators	Carolina Panthers	
Kaden Davis	WR	Houston Gamblers	Chicago Bears	
Tony Fields II	LB	Columbus Aviators	Chicago Bears	
Antonio Grier	LB	Louisville Kings	Chicago Bears	
Deantre Prince	CB	Louisville Kings	Chicago Bears	
Travis Bell	DT	Louisville Kings	Cleveland Browns	
Jashaun Corbin	RB	Orlando Storm	Dallas Cowboys	
Chris Glaser	G	Columbus Aviators	Dallas Cowboys	
Denzel Mims	WR	Dallas Renegades	Dallas Cowboys	
**Ameer Speed**	CB	Houston Gamblers	Dallas Cowboys	
Israel Antwine	DT	Houston Gamblers	Denver Broncos	
Hakeem Butler	WR	St. Louis Battlehawks	Denver Broncos	
Sean Fresch	CB/PR	St. Louis Battlehawks	Denver Broncos	
Ron Stone Jr.	DE	Columbus Aviators	Denver Broncos	
Tarik Black	WR	Louisville Kings	Detroit Lions	
Ekow Boye-Doe	CB	DC Defenders	Detroit Lions	
Bump Cooper	CB	Birmingham Stallions	Detroit Lions	
Lucky Jackson	WR	Louisville Kings	Detroit Lions	
Lawrence Keys III	WR	Houston Gamblers	Detroit Lions	
**Tay Martin**	WR	Columbus Aviators	Detroit Lions	
Jason Taylor II	S	Orlando Storm	Detroit Lions	
Trey Dean	S	St. Louis Battlehawks	Green Bay Packers	
Tra Fluellen	S	Dallas Renegades	Green Bay Packers	
Kaden Prather	WR	Louisville Kings	Green Bay Packers	
Bryce Hall	CB	Louisville Kings	Houston Texans	
Derek Parish	DE	DC Defenders	Houston Texans	
Deuce Vaughn	RB	Orlando Storm	Houston Texans	
Trey Wedig	OT	DC Defenders	Indianapolis Colts	
Kellen Diesch	OT	Louisville Kings	Kansas City Chiefs	
Gary Jennings Jr.	WR	St. Louis Battlehawks	Los Angeles Chargers	
Alex Cook	S	Birmingham Stallions	Los Angeles Rams	
Steven Gilmore Jr.	CB	Birmingham Stallions	Los Angeles Rams	
Gottlieb Ayedze	OT	Houston Gamblers	Miami Dolphins	
Major Burns	S	Houston Gamblers	Miami Dolphins	
Jaheim Thomas	LB	Louisville Kings	Miami Dolphins	
Kenny Dyson	LB	Houston Gamblers	Minnesota Vikings	
Casey Rogers	DT	DC Defenders	New England Patriots	
Tanner Brown	K	Louisville Kings	New Orleans Saints	
Hunter Dekkers	QB	Houston Gamblers	New Orleans Saints	
Jalen Moreno-Cropper	WR	Houston Gamblers	New Orleans Saints	
D. J. James	CB	Orlando Storm	New York Giants	
Cam Camper	WR	Orlando Storm	New York Jets	
Patrick Jenkins	DT	Columbus Aviators	New York Jets/Cleveland Browns	
Isaiah Bolden	CB	Louisville Kings	Philadelphia Eagles	
Erik Ezukanma	WR	DC Defenders	Philadelphia Eagles	
Jaylen Mahoney	S	Orlando Storm	Philadelphia Eagles	
Shaun Wade	CB	Dallas Renegades	Philadelphia Eagles	
Cornell Powell	WR	DC Defenders	Pittsburgh Steelers	
Jacoby Windmon	LB	Columbus Aviators	Pittsburgh Steelers	
Isaiah Winstead	WR	Louisville Kings	Pittsburgh Steelers	
Jah Joyner	DE	Houston Gamblers	San Francisco 49ers	
Roman Parodie	CB	Houston Gamblers	Tampa Bay Buccaneers	
Hudson Clark	S	Birmingham Stallions	Tennessee Titans/Arizona Cardinals	
Mario Goodrich	CB	Birmingham Stallions	Tennessee Titans	
Dyontae Johnson	LB	Birmingham Stallions	Tennessee Titans	
Corey Mayfield Jr.	CB	Louisville Kings	Tennessee Titans	
Boogie Basham	LB	DC Defenders	Washington Commanders	
Curtis Jacobs	LB	DC Defenders	Washington Commanders	
Quindell Johnson	S	Louisville Kings	Washington Commanders	
Tre' McKitty	TE	Louisville Kings	Washington Commanders	
