= 2026 United Bowl =

American football championship game

2026 UFL championship game
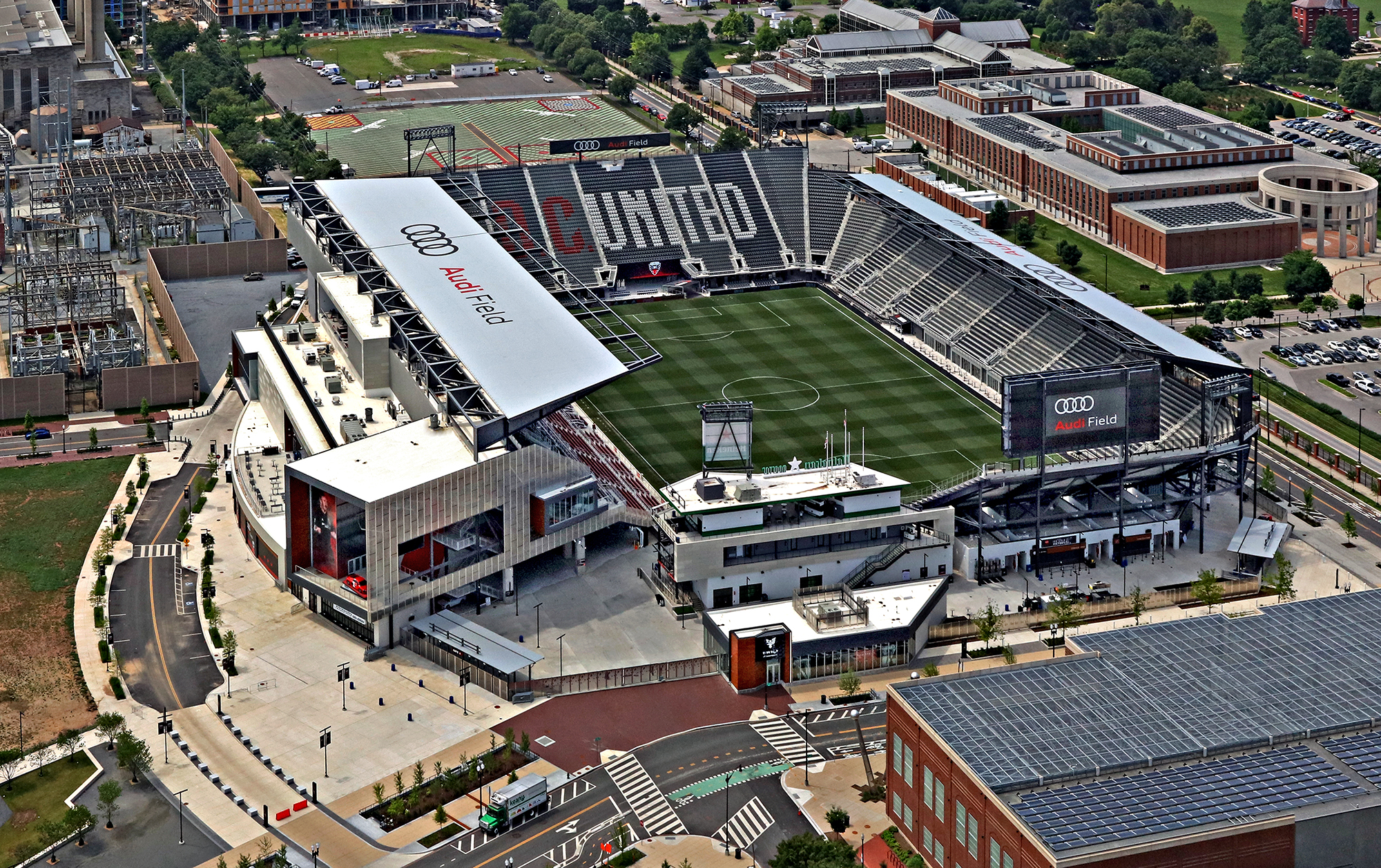
- Audi Field, where the game was played.
DC Defenders (5–5)	Louisville Kings (6–4)
20	27
Head coach: Shannon Harris	Head coach: Chris Redman
	1	2	3	4	Total
DC	3	13	0	4	20
LOU	0	7	6	14	27
- Date: June 13, 2026
- Kickoff time: 3:00 p.m. EDT (UTC-4)
- Stadium: Audi Field; Washington, D.C.
- MVP: Ian Wheeler, running back
- Favorite: Defenders by 1.5
- Referee: Kole Knueppel
- Attendance: 19,023

Ceremonies
- National anthem: Voices of Service
- Halftime show: 50 Cent

TV in the United States
- Network: ABC
- Announcers: Joe Tessitore (play-by-play), Jordan Rodgers (analyst), Sam Acho (sideline reporter), Tom Luginbill (sideline reporter) and Tyler Fulghum (betting)
- Nielsen ratings: 1.0 (0.98 million viewers)

The 2026 United Bowl was the third championship of the United Football League, and it was the first to be played under the United Bowl name. The game was played on June 13, 2026, at Audi Field in Washington, D.C.. The contest determined the champion of the 2026 UFL season and was played between the Louisville Kings and the DC Defenders. The game began at 3:00 p.m. EDT and aired on ABC. The Kings won 27–20, earning their first United Bowl title.

== Background ==
=== Host selection ===
Audi Field had previously been the first choice to host the 2025 championship but was unable to do so because of schedule conflicts with the 2025 FIFA Club World Cup.

=== UFL playoffs ===
==== Bracket ====
Semifinals; June 7, 2026
1	Orlando Storm	22
4	DC Defenders	28
2	St. Louis Battlehawks	20
3	Louisville Kings	29

United Bowl; June 13, 2026
4	DC Defenders	20
3	Louisville Kings	27

== Teams ==
=== DC Defenders ===
The DC Defenders finished the 2026 season with a 5–5 record. They made their second appearance in the UFL championship game after winning the title in 2025 by defeating the Michigan Panthers, 58–34. DC also played in the 2023 XFL Championship Game, a loss to the Arlington Renegades.

=== Louisville Kings ===
The Louisville Kings finished their first season in existence with a 6–4 record, having rebounded from an 0–3 start to win six of their last seven games. The turnaround was in part caused by the trading of their original starting quarterback Jason Bean to DC; Bean then rose to the Defenders' starting quarterback position after an injury to longtime Defenders starter Jordan Ta'amu.

== Matchup ==
The matchup marked the third meeting between the two teams during the season, with Louisville winning the previous two contests. DC made its third championship game appearance in franchise history and its second in the UFL. Although the game was originally designated as a neutral-site championship, it was held at the home stadium of the Defenders. The Defenders entered the game without 2025 UFL championship game MVP quarterback Jordan Ta'amu, who suffered a torn ACL during a Week 8 loss to the Kings. Following an ineffective performance by backup quarterback Spencer Sanders against Orlando, DC turned to third-string quarterback Jason Bean for its Week 10 matchup against the Storm, a game the Defenders lost. Bean, however, later led DC to an upset playoff victory over top-seeded Orlando after the Storm had defeated the Defenders in each of their previous two meetings. Bean began the season as Louisville's starting quarterback, starting the first four games before being traded to DC in exchange for Mike DiLiello. The move opened the door for Chandler Rogers, who went 5–1 as Louisville's starter during the regular season before leading the Kings to a playoff victory over the St. Louis Battlehawks. The championship game also marked the first on-field meeting between Bean and Rogers, who were teammates at Lake Ridge High School in Mansfield, Texas.

== Game summary ==
=== First half ===
Following punts on both opening possessions, scoring opened with a Matt McCrane 48-yard field goal for DC. After Louisville's second consecutive punt, DC running back Xazavian Valladay broke free for a 54-yard run before being chased down and tackled by Keaton Ellis, who forced a fumble that bounced 35 yards into the end zone where Cameron Dantzler recovered for a Louisville touchback.

Early in the second quarter, Rogers was intercepted by Kai Gray. On DC's ensuing possession, a completion from Bean to Ty Scott was forced loose by Corey Mayfield, and the fumble was recovered and returned 12 yards for a Louisville touchdown by Eric Garror, giving the Kings a 7–3 lead. Valladay later redeemed himself on DC's next drive, scoring on a 51-yard touchdown run to regain the lead. Following a Louisville punt, McCrane added a 57-yard field goal for DC. On Louisville's next possession, Rogers was intercepted again by Gray, setting up a 28-yard McCrane field goal that extended DC's lead to 16–7 at halftime. Despite both quarterbacks being held to fewer than 50 passing yards, the Defenders outgained the Kings 227–62 and held a 209–41 advantage on the ground, while both teams committed two turnovers. Artist 50 Cent performed the halftime show.

=== Second half ===
Louisville scored its first offensive points of the contest on its opening drive with a Tanner Brown 57-yard field goal, set up by a 19-yard run from James Robinson. On DC's ensuing possession, Bean suffered a left shoulder separation on an incomplete third-down pass attempt, ruling him out for the remainder of the game. Brown later cut the deficit to three points with his second field goal of the game, a 38-yard kick. DC then turned to quarterback E. J. Perry, who had been signed on May 25 and had not appeared in the Week 10 game or playoffs to that point. Following a DC three-and-out, Louisville running back Ian Wheeler broke free for a 44-yard go-ahead touchdown run on the first play of the fourth quarter, his eighth touchdown of the season.

After generating just six offensive yards in the third quarter, DC's ensuing drive was derailed when Perry's long completion to Cornell Powell was negated by offensive pass interference. On the same drive, Perry was shortly afterwards intercepted on a deep post route by Dantzler, who returned it 47 yards to the DC 25-yard line. Two plays later, Robinson broke multiple tackles on a 16-yard touchdown run, extending Louisville's lead to 27–16 with just over 12 minutes remaining. A strong kickoff return by Valladay to midfield sparked a promising drive, but multiple penalties stalled the possession. McCrane salvaged the drive with a 60-yard four-point field goal, his fourth of the season, cutting the deficit to 27–20 with just over nine minutes remaining. Following a Louisville three-and-out, Perry led DC inside the red zone. On fourth down from inside the Kings’ 10-yard line, his pass sailed over Powell and fell incomplete with under two minutes remaining. With no timeouts remaining, DC was unable to stop the clock, and Louisville ran out the clock to secure a 27–20 victory and the championship. The Kings finished the season winning eight of their final nine games.

Running back Ian Wheeler was named the game's most valuable player, rushing for 81 yards on 10 carries, including the go-ahead 44-yard touchdown run in the fourth quarter. He also returned a kickoff for 28 yards.

=== Scoring summary ===
2026 United Bowl

Quarter	1	2	3	4	Total
DC Defenders	3	13	0	4	20
Louisville Kings	0	7	6	14	27

at Audi Field • Washington, D.C.

- Date: Saturday, June 13, 2026
- Game time: 3:00 p.m. EDT
- Game weather: Partly cloudy, 89 °F (32 °C)
- Game attendance: 19,023
- Referee: Kole Knueppel
- TV announcers (ABC): Joe Tessitore (play-by-play), Jordan Rodgers (analyst), Sam Acho (sideline reporter), Tom Luginbill (sideline reporter) and Tyler Fulghum (betting)
- Game Book

Game information
First quarter
- DC – Matt McCrane 48-yard field goal, 6:43. Defenders 3–0. Drive: 6 plays • 52 yards • 2:51

Second quarter

- LOU – Eric Garror 12-yard fumble return (Tanner Brown kick), 11:43. Kings 7–3.
- DC – Xazavian Valladay 51-yard run (Matt McCrane kick), 9:45. Defenders 10–7. Drive: 4 plays • 74 yards • 1:50
- DC – Matt McCrane 43-yard field goal, 2:00. Defenders 13–7. Drive: 10 plays • 53 yards • 5:19
- DC – Matt McCrane 28-yard field goal, 0:02. Defenders 16–7. Drive: 4 plays • 3 yards • 1:18

Third quarter

- LOU – Tanner Brown 57-yard field goal, 11:42. Defenders 16–10. Drive: 6 plays • 23 yards • 3:18
- LOU – Tanner Brown 38-yard field goal, 6:08. Defenders 16–13. Drive: 8 plays • 59 yards • 3:44

Fourth quarter

- LOU – Ian Wheeler 44-yard run (Tanner Brown kick), 14:53. Kings 20–16. Drive: 7 plays • 84 yards • 4:03
- LOU – James Robinson 16-yard run (Tanner Brown kick), 12:07. Kings 27–16. Drive: 2 plays • 25 yards • 0:40
- DC – Matt McCrane 61-yard four-point field goal, 9:11. Kings 27–20. Drive: 5 plays • 10 yards • 3:00

== Statistics ==
Team statistical comparison
Statistic	DC	Louisville
Total plays–net yards	57–319	51–261
Rushing attempts–net yards	35–262	34–180
Yards per rush	7.5	5.3
Yards passing	69	81
Pass completions–attempts	8–20	9–17
Interceptions thrown	1	2
Punt returns–total yards	3–38	2–31
Kickoff returns–total yards	5–135	3–62
Punts–average yardage	3–150	4–200
Fumbles–lost	3–2	0–0
Time of possession	31:18	28:42

DC statistics
Defenders passing
	C–A	Yds	TD–INT
E.J. Perry	5–12	50	0–1
Jason Bean	3–8	19	0–0
Defenders rushing
	Car	Yds	TD
Xazavian Valladay	4	111	1
Deon Jackson	11	56	0
E.J. Perry	7	43	0
Jason Bean	7	35	0
Abram Smith	5	22	0
Erik Ezukanma	1	-5	0
Defenders receiving
	Rec	Yds	TD
Cornell Powell	3	40	0
Ty Scott	3	19	0
Keke Coutee	1	9	0
Xazavian Valladay	1	1	0

Louisville statistics
Kings passing
	C–A	Yds	TD–INT
Chandler Rogers	9–17	81	0–2
Kings rushing
	Car	Yds	TD
Ian Wheeler	10	81	1
James Robinson	16	69	1
Chandler Rogers	7	32	0
Isaiah Winstead	1	-2	0
Kings receiving
	Rec	Yds	TD
Tarik Black	1	40	0
Isaiah Winstead	4	22	0
Lucky Jackson	2	10	0
Tre' McKitty	1	8	0
Kaden Prather	1	1	0

== See also ==
- United Bowl
- USFL Championship Game
- XFL Championship Game
