= 2026 DC Defenders season =

American professional football season

- Owner: Alpha Acquico, LLC
- Head coach: Shannon Harris
- Home stadium: Audi Field

Results
- Record: 5–5
- Conference place: 4th in UFL
- Playoffs: Won Semifinals (at Storm) 28–22; Lost United Bowl (vs. Kings) 20–27

Uniform
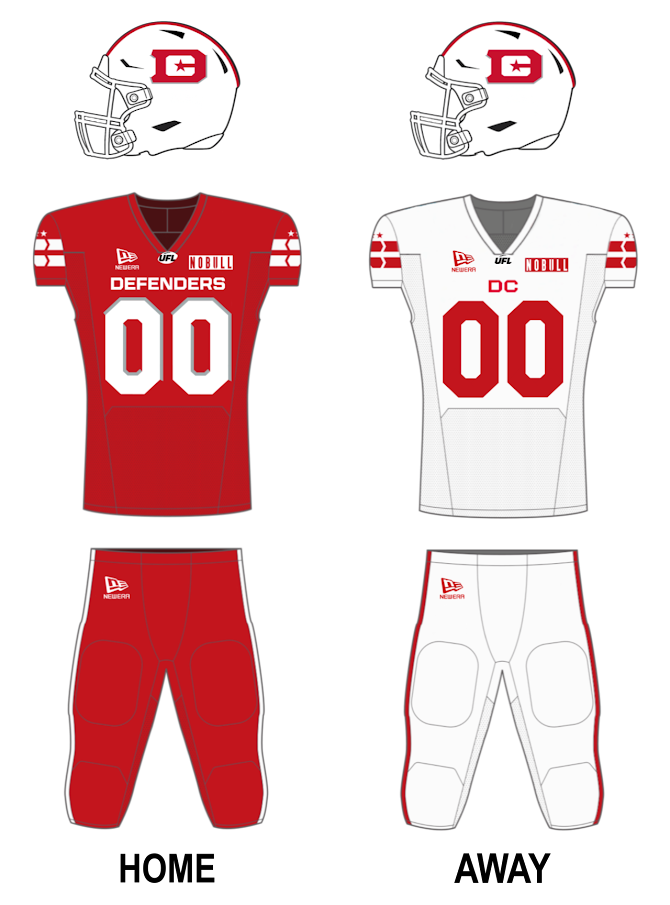

The 2026 DC Defenders season was the fifth season for the DC Defenders and their third in the UFL. The Defenders were unable to improve from their 6–4 record from last season, where they won the UFL Championship following back-to-back losses to the expansion team Orlando Storm.

On April 11, in their home opener in Week 3, the Defenders set a league record for the largest margin of victory by any team courtesy of crushing the Houston Gamblers by the score of 45–7. In Week 9, the Defenders clinched a playoff berth for the second straight season after the Birmingham Stallions lost to another expansion team, the Columbus Aviators.

After starting the season with a 5–1 record, which saw them on a 5-game winning streak, the Defenders lost star quarterback Jordan Ta'amu to an ACL injury in Week 8, which resulted in a collapse, as they ended the season on a 4-game losing streak to secure their worst record since 2024.

Despite losing to the Storm in their final two games of the season however, they won the UFL Semifinal against the Storm 28–22, giving Storm head coach Anthony Becht an 0–3 all-time record in the playoffs and securing a trip to the United Bowl, against the Louisville Kings, where after leading 16–7 at halftime they fell apart en route to a 27–20 loss.

== Offseason ==
=== Coaching changes ===
On December 15, 2025, Shannon Harris would remain as the head coach of the Defenders. On February 23, 2026, the Defenders announced their full 2026 coaching staff.

=== Draft ===
Teams were allowed to protect up to 12 players from their 2025 rosters.

== Staff ==
DC Defenders staff
Head coach: Head coach – Shannon Harris; Offensive coaches: Offensive coordinator – Fred Kaiss; Quarterbacks – Davis Johnson; Wide receivers – Andre Simmons; Offensive line – Brian Braswell	Defensive coaches: Defensive coordinator – Blake Williams; Linebackers/special teams – Jerod Kruse; Defensive backs – Vernon Dean

== Roster ==
2026 DC Defenders final roster
Quarterbacks: 12 Jason Bean; 5 E. J. Perry; 18 Spencer Sanders; Running backs: 25 Deon Jackson; 4 Abram Smith; 24 Xazavian Valladay; Wide receivers: 15 Keke Coutee; 13 Erik Ezukanma; 14 Cornell Powell; 3 Braylon Sanders; 19 Ty Scott; Tight ends: 87 Ben Bresnahan; 84 Mason Fairchild; 88 Briley Moore	Offensive linemen: 56 Johari Branch G; 74 Gunner Britton G; 79 Tykeem Doss G; 71 Jaelyn Duncan T; 68 Steven Losoya G/C; 51 Mike Maietti C; 72 Michael Tarquin T; 75 Trey Wedig T; Defensive linemen: 90 Boogie Basham DE; 91 Dennis Johnson DT; 95 Devonnsha Maxwell DT; 48 Andre Mintze DE; 8 Derek Parish DE; 50 Derick Roberson DE; 98 Casey Rogers DE/DT; 7 Joseph Wallace DT	Linebackers: 45 Brian Abraham; 48 Macklin Ayers; 44 Micah Baskerville; 6 Ferrod Gardner; 57 Anthony Hines; 23 Curtis Jacobs; 40 Brandon Smith; Defensive backs: 9 Deontay Anderson SS; 2 Deandre Baker CB; 28 Ekow Boye-Doe CB; 0 Gareon Conley CB; 22 Willie Drew CB; 17 Kai Gray SS; 20 Azizi Hearn CB; 11 Isaiah Johnson FS; 26 Sam Kidd FS; 1 Bryce Thompson CB; Special teams: 80 Trae Barry LS; 47 Paxton Brooks P; 16 Matt McCrane K	Reserve lists: -- Parker Clements T Retired; 70 Yasir Durant T (IR); -- Gabriel Murphy LB (IR) Retired; 10 Jordan Ta'amu QB (IR); 21 Gabe Taylor CB (IR); 11 Seth Williams WR (IR); 50 active, 6 inactive

== Schedule ==
All times Eastern

Week	Day	Date	Kickoff	TV	Opponent	Results		Location	Attendance
Week	Day	Date	Kickoff	TV	Opponent	Score	Record	Location	Attendance
1	Saturday	March 28	12:00 p.m.	ESPN	at St. Louis Battlehawks	L 10–16	0–1	The Dome at America's Center	31,191
2	Friday	April 3	8:00 p.m.	Fox	at Columbus Aviators	W 44–26	1–1	Historic Crew Stadium	14,810
3	Saturday	April 11	12:00 p.m.	ESPN	Houston Gamblers	W 45–7	2–1	Audi Field	12,167
4	Saturday	April 18	12:30 p.m.	ABC	St. Louis Battlehawks	W 28–22	3–1	Audi Field	7,940
5	Friday	April 24	8:00 p.m.	Fox	at Birmingham Stallions	W 45–28	4–1	Protective Stadium	8,120
6	Saturday	May 2	12:00 p.m.	ABC	Dallas Renegades	W 24–6	5–1	Audi Field	7,019
7	Saturday	May 9	1:30 p.m.	Fox	Louisville Kings	L 13–30	5–2	Audi Field	7,950
8	Saturday	May 16	12:00 p.m.	ABC	at Louisville Kings	L 30–33	5–3	Lynn Family Stadium	10,025
9	Friday	May 22	8:00 p.m.	Fox	at Orlando Storm	L 19–27	5–4	Inter&Co Stadium	10,594
10	Sunday	May 31	12:00 p.m.	ABC	Orlando Storm	L 23–29	5–5	Audi Field	9,924

=== Game summaries ===
==== Week 1: at St. Louis Battlehawks ====
Week 1: DC Defenders at St. Louis Battlehawks – Game summary

Quarter	1	2	3	4	Total
Defenders	10	0	0	0	10
Battlehawks	3	3	7	3	16

at The Dome at America's Center • St. Louis, Missouri

- Date: March 28
- Game time: 12:00 p.m. EDT
- Game weather: Sunny, 39 °F (4 °C)
- Game attendance: 31,191
- Referee: Adam Savoie
- TV announcers (ESPN): Mark Jones, Roddy Jones, Cole Cubelic and Harry Douglas
- Game Book

Game information

First quarter

- DC – Matt McCrane 60-yard four-point field goal, 9:08. Defenders 4–0. Drive: 8 plays • 35 yards • 4:08
- STL – Tucker McCann 58-yard field goal, 5:38. Defenders 4–3. Drive: 7 plays • 17 yards • 3:30
- DC – Deon Jackson 1-yard run (two-point pass failed), 1:17. Defenders 10–3. Drive: 10 plays • 71 yards • 4:21

Second quarter

- STL – Tucker McCann 27-yard field goal, 0:00. Defenders 10–6. Drive: 8 plays • 77 yards • 3:41

Third quarter

- STL – Tyler Neville 10-yard pass from Brandon Silvers (Tucker McCann kick), 8:02. Battlehawks 13–10. Drive: 3 plays • 51 yards • 1:57

Fourth quarter

- STL – Tucker McCann 25-yard field goal, 11:59. Battlehawks 16–10. Drive: 12 plays • 41 yards • 6:35

Top passers

- DC – Jordan Ta'amu – 9/16, 123 yards, 2 INT
- STL – Brandon Silvers – 16/28, 198 yards, TD

Top rushers

- DC – Deon Jackson – 17 rushes, 57 yards, TD
- STL – Jarveon Howard – 11 rushes, 45 yards

Top receivers

- DC – Seth Williams – 3 receptions, 51 yards
- STL – Jarveon Howard – 4 receptions, 24 yards

In a rematch of last season's XFL championship, the Defenders opened up their season against the Battlehawks in St. Louis. Unfortunately for DC, the Battlehawks would avenge their loss in the championship game, defeating the Defenders by the score of 16–10, causing the Defenders to start 0–1. Despite the loss, one of the few bright spots for the team, was in the first quarter, when placekicker Matt McCrane succeeded at making the first 60-yard four point field goal in league history.

==== Week 2: at Columbus Aviators ====
Week 2: DC Defenders at Columbus Aviators – Game summary

Quarter	1	2	3	4	Total
Defenders	7	17	14	6	44
Aviators	7	7	6	6	26

at Historic Crew Stadium • Columbus, Ohio

- Date: April 3
- Game time: 8:00 p.m. EDT
- Game weather: Partly cloudy, 72 °F (22 °C)
- Game attendance: 14,810
- Referee: Michael Vandervelde
- TV announcers (Fox): Curt Menefee, Joel Klatt and Brock Huard
- Game Book

Game information

First quarter

- DC – Deon Jackson 1-yard run (Matt McCrane kick), 10:37. Defenders 7–0. Drive: 8 plays • 43 yards • 4:23
- CLB – Jalan McClendon 1-yard run (Ryan Coe kick), 3:46. Tied 7–7. Drive: 13 plays • 60 yards • 6:51

Second quarter

- DC – Matt McCrane 35-yard field goal, 14:23. Defenders 10–7. Drive: 9 plays • 42 yards • 4:23
- DC – Xazavian Valladay 10-yard run (Matt McCrane kick), 5:11. Defenders 17–7. Drive: 9 plays • 59 yards • 4:33
- DC – Deon Jackson 12-yard run (Matt McCrane kick), 1:56. Defenders 24–7. Drive: 2 plays • 41 yards • 0:27
- CLB – ZaQuandre White 6-yard run (Ryan Coe kick), 0:55. Defenders 24–14. Drive: 3 plays • 15 yards • 0:18

Third quarter

- DC – Deon Jackson 48-yard run (Matt McCrane kick), 7:46. Defenders 31–14. Drive: 2 plays • 50 yards • 0:49
- DC – Briley Moore 21-yard pass from Jordan Ta'amu (Matt McCrane kick), 6:17. Defenders 38–14. Drive: 3 plays • 27 yards • 1:20
- CLB – Alizé Mack 21-yard pass from Jalan McClendon (two-point pass failed), 0:00. Defenders 38–20. Drive: 12 plays • 60 yards • 6:17

Fourth quarter

- DC – Matt McCrane 25-yard field goal, 8:12. Defenders 41–20. Drive: 10 plays • 56 yards • 6:48
- CLB – Tay Martin 3-yard pass from Jalan McClendon (three-point pass failed), 3:22. Defenders 41–26. Drive: 10 plays • 75 yards • 4:50
- DC – Matt McCrane 32-yard field goal, 1:56. Defenders 44–26. Drive: 4 plays • 4 yards • 1:21

Top passers

- DC – Jordan Ta'amu – 8/11, 99 yards, TD, INT
- CLB – Jalan McClendon – 23/37, 157 yards, 2 TD, INT

Top rushers

- DC – Deon Jackson – 11 rushes, 97 yards, 3 TD
- CLB – Jalan McClendon – 8 rushes, 55 yards, TD

Top receivers

- DC – Cornell Powell, 4 receptions, 41 yards
- CLB – Tay Martin, 6 receptions, 57 yards, TD

The Defenders would rebound by defeating the expansion team Aviators 44–26, and moving to 1–1 in the process.

==== Week 3: vs. Houston Gamblers ====
Week 3: Houston Gamblers at DC Defenders – Game summary

Quarter	1	2	3	4	Total
Gamblers	0	0	7	0	7
Defenders	11	17	3	14	45

at Audi Field • Washington, D.C.

- Date: April 11
- Game time: 12:00 p.m. EDT
- Game weather: Partly cloudy, 66 °F (19 °C)
- Game attendance: 12,167
- Referee: Bryan Banks
- TV announcers (ESPN): Lowell Galindo, Kirk Morrison, Aaron Murray and Eric Mac Lain
- Game Book

Game information

First quarter

- DC – Deon Jackson 60-yard run (Matt McCrane kick), 12:30. Defenders 7–0. Drive: 2 plays • 69 yards • 0:41
- DC – Matt McCrane 60-yard four-point field goal, 7:59. Defenders 11–0. Drive: 6 plays • 15 yards • 2:53

Second quarter

- DC – Matt McCrane 46-yard field goal, 12:40. Defenders 14–0. Drive: 4 plays • 4 yards • 1:43
- DC – Gareon Conley 70-yard interception return (Matt McCrane kick), 9:57. Defenders 21–0. Drive: 6 plays • 28 yards • 2:52
- DC – Briley Moore 24-yard run (Matt McCrane kick), 0:35. Defenders 28–0. Drive: 9 plays • 76 yards • 4:43

Third quarter

- DC – Matt McCrane 38-yard field goal, 8:24. Defenders 31–0. Drive: 9 plays • 45 yards • 6:41
- HOU – Justin Hall 6-yard pass from Taulia Tagovailoa (John Hoyland kick), 4:02. Defenders 31–7. Drive: 8 plays • 53 yards • 4:23

Fourth quarter

- DC – Briley Moore 20-yard pass from Jordan Ta'amu (Matt McCrane kick), 12:38. Defenders 38–7. Drive: 5 plays • 55 yards • 1:54
- DC – Abram Smith 15-yard run (Matt McCrane kick), 4:42. Defenders 45–7. Drive: 8 plays • 60 yards • 4:34

Top passers

- HOU – Taulia Tagovailoa – 21/40, 171 yards, TD, INT
- DC – Jordan Ta'amu – 15/27, 173 yards, TD, INT

Top rushers

- HOU – Jalen White – 10 rushes, 28 yards
- DC – Deon Jackson – 5 rushes, 70 yards, TD

Top receivers

- HOU – Justin Hall – 9 receptions, 69 yards, TD
- DC – Ty Scott – 4 receptions, 49 yards

For their home opener, the Defenders hosted the Gamblers, who were coming off an upset win over the Stallions the week prior. The Defenders would have a 28–0 lead at the half and would ultimately win 45–7. The 38-point margin marked the largest margin of victory in UFL history, and DC improved to 2–1 with this win.

==== Week 4: vs. St. Louis Battlehawks ====
Week 4: St. Louis Battlehawks at DC Defenders – Game summary

Quarter	1	2	3	4	Total
Battlehawks	3	9	0	10	22
Defenders	7	10	5	6	28

at Audi Field • Washington, D.C.

- Date: April 18
- Game time: 12:30 p.m. EDT
- Game weather: Partly cloudy, 78 °F (26 °C)
- Game attendance: 7,940
- Referee: Michael Vandervelde
- TV announcers (ABC): Roy Philpott, Jordan Rodgers, Sam Acho and Tom Luginbill
- Game Book

Game information

First quarter

- STL – Tucker McCann 51-yard field goal, 9:08. Battlehawks 3–0. Drive: 12 plays • 39 yards • 5:55
- DC – Keke Coutee 14-yard pass from Jordan Ta'amu (Matt McCrane kick), 3:30. Defenders 7–3. Drive: 11 plays • 72 yards • 5:41

Second quarter

- STL – Hakeem Butler 75-yard pass from Harrison Frost (kick failed), 13:28. Battlehawks 9–7. Drive: 1 plays • 75 yards • 0:12
- DC – Matt McCrane 56-yard field goal, 13:16. Defenders 10–9. Drive: 5 plays • 22 yards • 2:15
- DC – Ty Scott 3-yard pass from Jordan Ta'amu (Matt McCrane kick), 3:11. Defenders 17–9. Drive: 10 plays • 65 yards • 5:53
- STL – Tucker McCann 26-yard field goal, 0:00. Defenders 17–12. Drive: 3 plays • 67 yards • 0:18

Third quarter

- DC – Matt McCrane 43-yard field goal, 8:49. Defenders 20–12. Drive: 11 plays • 48 yards • 6:14
- DC – Harrison Frost sacked in the end zone for a safety, 8:23. Defenders 22–12. Drive: 1 plays • -21 yards • 0:26

Fourth quarter

- DC – Matt McCrane 24-yard field goal, 12:54. Defenders 25–12. Drive: 8 plays • 49 yards • 4:46
- STL – Kevon Latulas 7-yard run (Tucker McCann kick), 10:00. Defenders 25–19. Drive: 5 plays • 65 yards • 2:51
- DC – Matt McCrane 39-yard field goal, 5:52. Defenders 28–19. Drive: 8 plays • 44 yards • 4:10
- STL – Tucker McCann 28-yard field goal, 2:00. Defenders 28–22. Drive: 7 plays • 63 yards • 3:52

Top passers

- STL – Harrison Frost – 6/21, 144 yards, TD, INT
- DC – Jordan Ta'amu – 22/36, 204 yards, 2 TD

Top rushers

- STL – Jarveon Howard – 8 rushes, 85 yards
- DC – Jordan Ta'amu – 11 rushes, 61 yards

Top receivers

- STL – Hakeem Butler – 2 receptions, 109 yards, TD
- DC – Cornell Powell – 7 receptions, 85 yards

In a rematch of Week 1's game, the teams met each other once again in DC. Things got off to a rough start for DC, as they allowed the Battlehawks to march down the field to tack on the first three points of the game via a 51-yard field goal by kicker Tucker McCann. However, the Defenders managed to outscore the Battlehawks 25–9 to take a 25–12 lead in the fourth quarter, only to allow the Battlehawks to rally by scoring 10 unanswered points in between of Matt McCrane's 39-yard field goal, but St. Louis' comeback attempt fell short and their fate was sealed when backup quarterback Harrison Frost threw an interception to strong safety Sam Kidd at the DC 5-yard line.

With their third straight win, DC is now 3–1 on the season. The Defenders would even the season series with the Battlehawks at 1–1, and would improve to 6–4 all-time against the Battlehawks.

==== Week 5: at Birmingham Stallions ====
Week 5: DC Defenders at Birmingham Stallions – Game summary

Quarter	1	2	3	4	Total
Defenders	7	14	17	7	45
Stallions	6	7	6	9	28

at Protective Stadium • Birmingham, Alabama

- Date: April 24
- Game time: 8:00 p.m. EDT
- Game weather: Partly cloudy, 58 °F (14 °C)
- Game attendance: 8,120
- Referee: Jason Autrey
- TV announcers (Fox): Kevin Kugler, Devin Gardner and Jenny Taft
- Game Book

Game information

First quarter

- DC – Javon Antonio 13-yard pass from Jordan Ta'amu (Matt McCrane kick), 11:21. Defenders 7–0. Drive: 6 plays • 28 yards • 3:39
- BIR – Deon Cain 12-yard pass from Dorian Thompson-Robinson (kick failed), 3:37. Defenders 7–6. Drive: 4 plays • 24 yards • 1:51

Second quarter

- DC – Xazavian Valladay 2-yard run (Matt McCrane kick), 6:21. Defenders 14–6. Drive: 8 plays • 33 yards • 4:20
- DC – Ty Scott 45-yard pass from Jordan Ta'amu (Matt McCrane kick), 4:07. Defenders 21–6 Drive: 1 plays • 45 yards • 0:10
- BIR – Jordan Thomas 1-yard pass from Dorian Thompson-Robinson (Anders Carlson kick), 0:24. Defenders 21–13. Drive: 11 plays • 80 yards • 3:43

Third quarter

- BIR – Snoop Conner 1-yard run (two-point pass failed), 13:01. Defenders 21–19. Drive: 4 plays • 68 yards • 1:59
- DC – Ty Scott 37-yard pass from Jordan Ta'amu (Matt McCrane kick), 8:13. Defenders 28–19. Drive: 8 plays • 69 yards • 4:48
- DC – Matt McCrane 47-yard field goal, 5:22. Defenders 31–19. Drive: 4 plays • 2 yards • 1:59
- DC – Xazavian Valladay 1-yard run (Matt McCrane kick), 0:55. Defenders 38–19. Drive: 5 plays • 59 yards • 2:20

Fourth quarter

- DC – Briley Moore 1-yard pass from Jordan Ta'amu (Matt McCrane kick), 8:18. Defenders 45–19. Drive: 7 plays • 53 yards • 4:26
- BIR – Dorian Thompson-Robinson 12-yard run (Dorian Thompson-Robinson–Jordan Thomas three-point pass), 1:53. Defenders 45–28. Drive: 13 plays • 76 yards • 6:25

Top passers

- DC – Jordan Ta'amu – 15/22, 275 yards, 4 TD
- BIR – Dorian Thompson-Robinson – 28/43, 313 yards, 2 TD, 2 INT

Top rushers

- DC – Xazavian Valladay – 8 rushes, 50 yards, 2 TD
- BIR – Dorian Thompson-Robinson – 4 rushes, 43 yards, TD

Top receivers

- DC – Ty Scott – 3 receptions, 84 yards, 2 TD
- BIR – Jaydon Mickens – 9 receptions, 107 yards

The Defenders have now won their fourth straight game by beating the Stallions on the road for the first time in franchise history and putting up 45 points for the second time this season. Jordan Ta'amu played very efficient, throwing 4 touchdown passes and the team didn't commit a single turnover, which contributed to the win. DC is now 4–1.

==== Week 6: vs. Dallas Renegades ====
Week 6: Dallas Renegades at DC Defenders – Game summary

Quarter	1	2	3	4	Total
Renegades	0	0	6	0	6
Defenders	7	17	0	0	24

at Audi Field • Washington, D.C.

- Date: May 2
- Game time: 12:00 p.m. EDT
- Game weather: Partly cloudy, 56 °F (13 °C)
- Game attendance: 7,019
- Referee: Chris Coyte
- TV announcers (ABC): Roy Philpott, Roddy Jones, Cole Cubelic and Max Browne
- Game Book

Game information

First quarter

- DC – Erik Ezukanma 7-yard pass from Jordan Ta'amu (Matt McCrane kick), 6:18. Defenders 7–0. Drive: 4 plays • 63 yards • 2:34.

Second quarter

- DC – Mason Fairchild 13-yard pass from Jordan Ta'amu (Matt McCrane kick), 10:42. Defenders 14–0. Drive: 12 plays • 58 yards • 7:04
- DC – Cornell Powell 12-yard pass from Jordan Ta'amu (Matt McCrane kick), 9:01. Defenders 21–0. Drive: 13 plays • 18 yards • 1:26
- DC – Matt McCrane 56-yard field goal, 0:41. Defenders 24–0. Drive: 9 plays • 36 yards • 2:30

Third quarter

- DAL – Tyler Vaughns 14-yard pass from Austin Reed (two-point pass failed), 7:48. Defenders 24–6. Drive: 4 plays • 66 yards • 1:55

Fourth quarter

- No scoring plays

Top passers

- DAL – Austin Reed – 22/41, 258 yards, TD, INT
- DC – Jordan Ta'amu – 20/28, 227 yards, 3 TD, INT

Top rushers

- DAL – Luke Lehnen – 2 rushes, 23 yards
- DC – Abram Smith – 8 rushes, 26 yards

Top receivers

- DAL – Deontay Burnett – 4 receptions, 82 yards
- DC – Briley Moore – 3 receptions, 59 yards

Back at home, the Defenders would win their fifth straight game, as they dominated the first half, cruised to a 24–0 halftime lead, and hung on for a 24–6 win over the Renegades, thus improving to 5–1.

==== Week 7: vs. Louisville Kings ====
Week 7: Louisville Kings at DC Defenders – Game summary

Quarter	1	2	3	4	Total
Kings	0	10	10	10	30
Defenders	0	13	0	0	13

at Audi Field • Washington, D.C.

- Date: May 9
- Game time: 1:30 p.m. EDT
- Game weather: Partly cloudy, 70 °F (21 °C)
- Game attendance: 7,950
- Referee: Jason Autrey
- TV announcers (Fox): Kevin Kugler, Joel Klatt and Jake Butt
- Game Book

Game information

First quarter

- No scoring plays

Second quarter

- LOU – Tanner Brown 48-yard field goal, 11:12. Kings 3–0. Drive: 11 plays • 50 yards • 5:38
- DC – Javon Antonio 81-yard pass from Jordan Ta'amu (two-point pass failed), 9:28. Defenders 6–3. Drive: 3 plays • 81 yards • 1:44
- DC – Ty Scott 20-yard pass from Jordan Ta'amu (Matt McCrane kick), 1:50. Defenders 13–3. Drive: 12 yards • 75 yards • 5:39
- LOU – Tarik Black 9-yard pass from Chandler Rogers (Tanner Brown kick), 0:38. Defenders 13–10. Drive: 6 yards • 51 yards • 1:12

Third quarter

- LOU – Tanner Brown 50-yard field goal, 10:04. Tied 13–13. Drive: 8 yards • 33 yards • 4:56
- LOU – Tarik Black 6-yard pass from Chandler Rogers (Tanner Brown kick), 7:52. Kings 20–13. Drive: 4 plays • 55 yards • 2:01

Fourth quarter

- LOU – James Robinson 1-yard run (Matt McCrane kick), 13:47. Kings 23–13. Drive: 2 plays • 23 yards • 0:35
- LOU – Tanner Brown 49-yard field goal, 4:30. Kings 30–13. Drive: 9 plays • 44 yards • 5:15

Top passers

- LOU – Chandler Rogers – 17/26, 201 yards, 2 TD
- DC – Jordan Ta'amu – 18/33, 353 yards, 2 TD, 2 INT

Top rushers

- LOU – Ian Wheeler – 8 rushes, 64 yards
- DC – Deon Jackson – 12 rushes, 26 yards

Top receivers

- LOU – Tarik Black – 5 receptions, 49 yards, 2 TD
- DC – Ty Scott – 5 receptions, 78 yards, TD

Although the Defenders were favored by 10 points coming into the game, they struggled. After leading 13–3 in the second quarter and 13–10 at halftime, they would have a second half collapse as the Kings would score 27 unanswered points and the Defenders would be shutout in the last two quarters, resulting in a historic upset and dropping DC to 5–2. They were denied a playoff berth, but look to clinch one next week if they win the rematch.

==== Week 8: at Louisville Kings ====
Week 8: DC Defenders at Louisville Kings – Game summary

Quarter	1	2	3	4	Total
Defenders	7	10	7	6	30
Kings	13	4	3	13	33

at Lynn Family Stadium • Louisville, Kentucky

- Date: May 16
- Game time: 12:00 p.m. EDT
- Game weather: Overcast, 71 °F (22 °C)
- Game attendance: 10,025
- Referee: Francisco Villar
- TV announcers (ABC): Roy Philpott, Roddy Jones, Harry Douglas and Cole Cubelic
- Game Book

Game information

First quarter

- DC – Ty Scott 41-yard pass from Jordan Ta'amu (Matt McCrane kick), 14:42. Defenders 7–0. Drive: 1 play • 41 yards • :18
- LOU – Tyler Hudson 92-yard kickoff return (Tanner Brown kick), 14:29. Tied 7–7.
- LOU – Tanner Brown 39-yard field goal, 9:55. Kings 10–7. Drive: 4 plays • –7 yards • 1:52
- LOU – Tanner Brown 28-yard field goal, 6:28. Kings 13–7. Drive: 4 plays • 1 yards • 1:56

Second quarter

- LOU – Tanner Brown 60-yard four-point field goal, 8:58. Kings 17–7. Drive: 6 plays • 47 yards • 2:53
- DC – Matt McCrane 51-yard field goal, 3:33. Kings 17–10. Drive: 8 plays • 14 yards • 4:32
- DC – Abram Smith 21-yard run (Matt McCrane kick), 0:29. Tied 17–17. Drive: 6 plays • 63 yards • 1:20

Third quarter

- LOU – Tanner Brown 35-yard field goal, 9:18. Kings 20–17. Drive: 11 plays • 53 yards • 5:42
- DC – Xazavian Valladay 13-yard run (Matt McCrane kick), 5:45. Defenders 24–20. Drive: 7 plays • 71 yards • 3:33

Fourth quarter

- LOU – James Robinson 1-yard run (kick blocked), 11:59. Kings 26–24. Drive: 16 plays • 87 yards • 8:46
- LOU – Isaiah Winstead 24-yard pass from Chandler Rogers (Tanner Brown kick), 7:43. Kings 33–24. Drive: 4 plays • 35 yards • 1:56
- DC – Deon Jackson 3-yard run (three-point pass failed), 0:28. Kings 33–30. Drive: 8 plays • 52 yards • 1:37

Top passers

- DC – Spencer Sanders – 7/15, 83 yards, INT
- LOU – Chandler Rogers – 11/20, 143 yards, TD, INT

Top rushers

- DC – Xazavian Valladay – 13 rushes, 107 yards, TD
- LOU – James Robinson – 20 rushes, 59 yards, TD

Top receivers

- DC – Erik Ezukanma – 4 receptions, 55 yards
- LOU – Isaiah Winstead – 5 receptions, 92 yards, TD

The Defenders once again faced the Kings, this time in Louisville. A win for the team would clinch a playoff berth for the second straight season. The Defenders appeared to be headed for that opportunity after Jordan Ta'amu threw a 41-yard touchdown pass to Ty Scott to open up the game. However, they once again fell apart, as the Kings would tie it up after Tyler Hudson returned the ensuing kickoff 92 yards for the touchdown, culminating in a 17–all tie at half. The Defenders got back into position for a playoff berth after entering the fourth quarter with a 24–20, but were outscored 13–6 in the fourth quarter. At the end of the game, Deon Jackson ran for a 3-yard touchdown with 28 seconds left, but failing the 3-point conversion and not getting the 4th & 12 sealed their fate, as they were swept by the Kings and dropped to 5–3.

During the first quarter, Ta'amu left with an injury that kept him out for the final three quarters. Following this game, Shannon Harris announced that he would place him on injured reserve for the remainder of the season.

==== Week 9: at Orlando Storm ====
Week 9: DC Defenders at Orlando Storm – Game summary

Quarter	1	2	3	4	Total
Defenders	10	0	3	6	19
Storm	7	14	3	3	27

at Inter&Co Stadium • Orlando, Florida

- Date: May 22
- Game time: 8:00 p.m. EDT
- Game weather: Sunny, 85 °F (29 °C)
- Game attendance: 10,594
- Referee: Adam Savoie
- TV announcers (Fox): Curt Menefee, Devin Gardner and Jenny Taft
- Game Book

Game information

First quarter

- ORL – Chris Rowland 62-yard pass from Jack Plummer (Michael Lantz kick), 11:24. Storm 7–0. Drive: 6 plays • 77 yards • 3:36
- DC – Matt McCrane 43-yard field goal, 7:04. Storm 7–3. Drive: 8 plays • 46 yards • 4:20
- DC – Deon Jackson 3-yard run (Matt McCrane kick), 0:51. Defenders 10–7. Drive: 4 plays • 59 yards • 1:41

Second quarter

- ORL – Elijhah Badger 41-yard pass from Jack Plummer (Michael Lantz kick), 14:30. Storm 14–10. Drive: 4 plays • 60 yards • 1:21
- ORL – Cam Camper 2-yard pass from Jack Plummer (Michael Lantz kick), 3:17. Storm 21–10. Drive: 9 plays • 63 yards • 5:15

Third quarter

- DC – Matt McCrane 56-yard field goal, 8:35. Storm 21–13. Drive: 9 plays • 37 yards • 6:25
- ORL – Michael Lantz 35-yard field goal, 3:24. Storm 24–13. Drive: 9 plays • 38 yards • 5:11

Fourth quarter

- DC – Matt McCrane 28-yard field goal, 8:28. Storm 24–16. Drive: 10 plays • 67 yards • 5:00
- DC – Matt McCrane 42-yard field goal, 1:36. Storm 24–19. Drive: 9 plays • 44 yards • 2:26
- ORL – Michael Lantz 51-yard field goal, 0:25. Storm 27–19. Drive: 4 plays • -5 yards • 1:05

Top passers

- DC – Spencer Sanders – 10/21, 160 yards
- ORL – Jack Plummer – 21/27, 275 yards, 3 TD

Top rushers

- DC – Spencer Sanders – 8 rushes, 75 yards
- ORL – Jashaun Corbin – 16 rushes, 52 yards

Top receivers

- DC – Cornell Powell – 4 receptions, 40 yards
- ORL – Chris Rowland – 8 receptions, 117 yards, TD

The Storm proved to be too much for the Ta'amu-less Defenders, who would wind up losing by the score of 27–19, losing their third straight and dropping to a 5–4 record.

Despite the loss, the Aviators helped the Defenders clinch their second straight playoff berth courtesy of a 36–29 win over the Birmingham Stallions.

==== Week 10: vs. Orlando Storm ====
Week 10: Orlando Storm at DC Defenders – Game summary

Quarter	1	2	3	4	Total
Storm	7	3	7	12	29
Defenders	3	6	8	6	23

at Audi Field • Washington, D.C.

- Date: May 31
- Game time: 12:00 p.m. EDT
- Game weather: Sunny, 75 °F (24 °C)
- Game attendance: 9,924
- Referee: Kole Knueppel
- TV announcers (ABC): Matt Schumacker, Jordan Rodgers, Sam Acho and Tom Luginbill
- Game Book

Game information

First quarter

- DC – Matt McCrane 28-yard field goal, 7:53. Defenders 3–0. Drive: 8 plays • 37 yards • 3:36
- ORL – Mishael Powell 93-yard interception return (Michael Lantz kick), 1:33. Storm 7–3.

Second quarter

- DC – Matt McCrane 38-yard field goal, 11:44. Storm 7–6. Drive: 11 plays • 56 yards • 4:49
- ORL – Michael Lantz 35-yard field goal, 0:19. Storm 10–6. Drive: 11 plays • 50 yards • 4:43
- DC – Matt McCrane 29-yard field goal, 0:00. Storm 10–9. Drive: 2 plays • 30 yards • 0:19

Third quarter

- ORL – Chris Rowland 31-yard pass from Jack Plummer (Michael Lantz kick), 11:31. Storm 17–9. Drive: 6 plays • 54 yards • 3:29
- DC – Xazavian Valladay 12-yard run (Deon Jackson two-point run), 0:57. Tied 17–17. Drive: 7 plays • 83 yards • 3:33

Fourth quarter

- ORL – Blocked punt out of bounds in the end zone for a safety, 11:38. Storm 19–17.
- ORL – Cam Camper 74-yard pass from Jack Plummer (Michael Lantz kick), 10:01. Storm 26–17. Drive: 3 plays • 76 yards • 1:37
- ORL – Michael Lantz 49-yard field goal, 8:00. Storm 29–17. Drive: 4 plays • 4 yards • 1:53
- DC – Briley Moore 16-yard pass from Jason Bean, 0:00. Storm 29–23. Drive: 4 plays • 46 yards • 0:40

Top passers

- ORL – Jack Plummer – 13/26, 203 yards, 2 TD
- DC – Jason Bean – 13/28, 165 yards, TD, 2 INT

Top rushers

- ORL – Jashaun Corbin – 12 rushes, 33 yards
- DC – Jason Bean – 11 rushes, 116 yards

Top receivers

- ORL – Chris Rowland – 4 receptions, 46 yards, TD
- DC – Cornell Powell – 5 receptions, 70 yards

With the loss, not only do the Defenders finish 5–5 by losing their fourth straight game, but with the Kings beating the Aviators that same day, DC was assigned to the 4th seed. Even had they won this game, Louisville would have the head-to-head tiebreaker from Weeks 7 and 8.

== Standings ==
2026 UFL standings
Team	W	L	PCT	GB	TD+/-	TD+	TD-	PF	PA	DIFF	STK
(y) Orlando Storm	8	2	.800	–	9	26	17	232	186	46	W4
(x) St. Louis Battlehawks	6	4	.600	2	-2	21	23	212	197	15	L1
(x) Louisville Kings	6	4	.600	2	1	27	26	265	219	46	W4
(x) DC Defenders	5	5	.500	3	6	31	25	281	224	57	L4
(e) Dallas Renegades	4	6	.400	4	2	30	28	224	259	-35	W1
(e) Birmingham Stallions	4	6	.400	4	-1	24	25	190	229	-39	L2
(e) Houston Gamblers	4	6	.400	4	-6	20	26	189	236	-60	W1
(e) Columbus Aviators	3	7	.300	5	-6	27	33	216	259	-43	L1
(x)–clinched playoff berth; (y)–clinched conference; (e)–eliminated from playoff contention

== Postseason ==
All times Eastern

Week	Day	Date	Kickoff	TV	Opponent	Results		Location	Attendance
Week	Day	Date	Kickoff	TV	Opponent	Score	Record	Location	Attendance
Semifinals	Sunday	June 7	3:00 p.m.	ABC	at Orlando Storm	W 28–22	1–0	Daytona Stadium	6,317
United Bowl	Saturday	June 13	3:00 p.m.	ABC	vs. Louisville Kings	L 20–27	1–1	Audi Field	19,023

=== UFL Semifinals: at Orlando Storm ===
UFL Semifinals: DC Defenders at Orlando Storm – Game summary

Quarter	1	2	3	4	Total
Defenders	14	0	10	4	28
Storm	3	3	7	9	22

at Daytona Stadium • Daytona Beach, Florida

- Date: June 7
- Game time: 3:00 p.m. EDT
- Game weather: Partly cloudy, 83 °F (28 °C)
- Game attendance: 6,317
- Referee: Chris Coyte
- TV announcers (ABC): Joe Tessitore, Jordan Rodgers, Sam Acho and Tom Luginbill
- Game Book

Game information

First quarter

- DC – Deon Jackson 3-yard run (Matt McCrane kick), 9:13. Defenders 7–0. Drive: 11 plays • 55 yards • 5:47
- ORL – Michael Lantz 47-yard field goal, 6:49. Defenders 7–3. Drive: 5 plays • 11 yards • 2:24
- DC – Abram Smith 3-yard run (Matt McCrane kick), 2:29. Defenders 14–3. Drive: 8 plays • 65 yards • 4:20

Second quarter

- ORL – Michael Lantz 32-yard field goal, 13:51. Defenders 14–6. Drive: 7 plays • 49 yards • 3:38

Third quarter

- DC – Matt McCrane 32-yard field goal, 10:44. Defenders 17–6. Drive: 7 plays • 19 yards • 4:03
- ORL – Kana'i Mauga 59-yard interception return (Michael Lantz kick), 3:47. Defenders 17–13.
- DC – Briley Moore 33-yard pass from Jason Bean (Matt McCrane kick), 0:27. Defenders 24–13. Drive: 7 plays • 75 yards • 3:20

Fourth quarter

- ORL – Michael Lantz 23-yard field goal, 8:02. Defenders 24–16. Drive: 15 plays • 76 yards • 7:25
- DC – Matt McCrane 61-yard four-point field goal, 4:17. Defenders 28–16. Drive: 7 plays • 17 yards • 3:45
- ORL – Chris Rowland 40-yard pass from Jack Plummer (three-point pass failed), 3:02. Defenders 28–22. Drive: 4 plays • 79 yards • 1:15

Top passers

- DC – Jason Bean – 18/33, 233 yards, TD
- ORL – Jack Plummer – 15/28, 226 yards, TD, INT

Top rushers

- DC – Abram Smith – 11 rushes, 57 yards, TD
- ORL – Jashaun Corbin – 5 rushes, 24 yards

Top receivers

- DC – Keke Coutee – 4 receptions, 58 yards
- ORL – Chris Rowland – 6 receptions, 82 yards, TD

Having lost their last two games of the season, both of which were against the Storm, the Defenders got to play a rubber match against the same team. This game took place in Daytona Beach due to a scheduling conflict in Orlando.

Unlike the previous two weeks, the Defenders ended up getting the last laugh, leading 14–3 at the end of the first quarter and ultimately hung on for a 28–22 road win that improved their overall record to 6–5 and sent them back to the Championship game.

=== United Bowl: vs. Louisville Kings ===
2026 United Bowl: DC Defenders vs. Louisville Kings – Game summary

Quarter	1	2	3	4	Total
Defenders	3	13	0	4	20
Kings	0	7	6	14	27

at Audi Field • Washington, D.C.

- Date: June 13
- Game time: 3:00 p.m. EDT
- Game weather: Partly cloudy, 89 °F (32 °C)
- Game attendance: 19,023
- Referee: Kole Knueppel
- TV announcers (ABC): Joe Tessitore (play-by-play), Jordan Rodgers (analyst), Sam Acho (sideline reporter), Tom Luginbill (sideline reporter) and Tyler Fulghum (betting)
- Game Book

Game information

First quarter

- DC – Matt McCrane 48-yard field goal, 6:43. Defenders 3–0. Drive: 6 plays • 52 yards • 2:51

Second quarter

- LOU – Eric Garror 12-yard fumble return (Tanner Brown kick), 11:43. Kings 7–3.
- DC – Xazavian Valladay 51-yard run (Matt McCrane kick), 9:45. Defenders 10–7. Drive: 4 plays • 74 yards • 1:50
- DC – Matt McCrane 43-yard field goal, 2:00. Defenders 13–7. Drive: 10 plays • 53 yards • 5:19
- DC – Matt McCrane 28-yard field goal, 0:02. Defenders 16–7. Drive: 4 plays • 3 yards • 1:18

Third quarter

- LOU – Tanner Brown 57-yard field goal, 11:42. Defenders 16–10. Drive: 6 plays • 23 yards • 3:18
- LOU – Tanner Brown 38-yard field goal, 6:08. Defenders 16–13. Drive: 8 plays • 59 yards • 3:44

Fourth quarter

- LOU – Ian Wheeler 44-yard run (Tanner Brown kick), 14:53. Kings 20–16. Drive: 7 plays • 84 yards • 4:03
- LOU – James Robinson 16-yard run (Tanner Brown kick), 12:07. Kings 27–16. Drive: 2 plays • 25 yards • 0:40
- DC – Matt McCrane 61-yard four-point field goal, 9:11. Kings 27–20. Drive: 5 plays • 10 yards • 3:00

Top passers

- DC – E.J. Perry – 5/12, 50 yards, INT
- LOU – Chandler Rogers – 9/17, 81 yards, 2 INT

Top rushers

- DC – Xazavian Valladay – 4 rushes, 111 yards, TD
- LOU – Ian Wheeler – 10 rushes, 81 yards, TD

Top receivers

- DC – Cornell Powell – 3 receptions, 40 yards
- LOU – Tarik Black – 1 reception, 40 yards

The Defenders were attempting to secure back-to-back championships for the first time since the Birmingham Stallions did so in 2022 and 2023. They were on the verge by doing so as they took a 16–7 lead at the break, but then things unraveled in the second half, as the half would be filled with injuries which would also see the offense allow two rushing touchdowns and allow the Kings to go on a 14–4 scoring run, and a defensive penalty late in the fourth quarter sealed the game for the Kings, while also denying the repeat in a 27–20 loss.

With the devastating collapse, the Defenders fell to 0–3 all-time against the Kings. They will seek to earn their championship next year.
