= List of starting quarterbacks in the UFL =

In American football, the starting quarterback is typically viewed as the leader of a team. The quarterback is considered the most important position on the field and among the most important positions in team sports. They are among the most high-profile athletes in North America and have been described as akin to A-list celebrities; in the United Football League, such quarterbacks benefit from national television exposure and in-game action that they may not get as backup or practice squad quarterbacks in the National Football League; former New York Guardians starter Matt McGloin, former Dallas Renegades starting quarterback Landry Jones and former St. Louis Battlehawks quarterback AJ McCarron all cited the ability to have their friends and family see them play professional football as reasons why they chose to play in the league. The success of an American football team often rests on the quarterback; thus, teams will go to great lengths to find a franchise quarterback to build around for the long-term goals of the team. This page contains the lists of starting quarterbacks for the eight teams that played in the XFL, a league that operated for 1½ seasons as a standalone league in 2020 and 2023. This page also contains the lists of starting quarterbacks for the nine teams that played in the United States Football League (USFL), a league that operated for 2 seasons as a standalone league in 2022 and 2023. Four teams from each league now constitute the XFL and USFL conferences respectively of the UFL.

Starting quarterbacks in the XFL received a substantially higher salary than backups and other position players. In the 2020 season, the salary for an XFL starting quarterback was $495,000 plus a $2,222 bonus for every game won as a member of the team; the "average quarterback" on a 2020 XFL roster was reputed to make $125,000, compared to $55,000 for other position players, with both figures including bonuses. The presumed starting quarterbacks were also assigned by the league office and not subject to the 2020 XFL draft, though this did not guarantee they would start. For 2023, the highest paid XFL starting quarterback, Brett Hundley, earned $200,000 in base salary, while Jordan Ta'amu and McCarron both made over $100,000, in addition to win bonuses. The XFL structure stood in contrast to the USFL, which purposely chose an egalitarian structure paying all players equally regardless of position; as a result, McCarron and Ta'amu were initially hesitant to stay with their teams as they transitioned to the UFL, which operates under the USFL's collective bargaining agreement (CBA). The USFL's players' union, United Steelworkers Local 9004, gave its permission for the league to sign players at a higher salary, stating that it would only enforce the relevant clause in the CBA as a minimum salary, not a hard salary cap, and openly encouraged the league to sign McCarron, offering to make union dues optional.

== Active UFL teams ==
=== Columbus Aviators ===
Season(s)	Regular season	Playoffs
2026	Jalan McClendon (8) / Jalen Morton (2)	

=== Dallas Renegades ===
Season(s)	Regular season	Playoffs
Dallas Renegades
2020	Landry Jones (3) / Philip Nelson (2)	
2021–2022	Suspended operations	
Arlington Renegades
2023	Kyle Sloter (4) / Drew Plitt (3) / Luis Perez (3)	Luis Perez (2)
2024	Luis Perez (10)	
2025	Luis Perez (10)	
Dallas Renegades
2026	Austin Reed (10)	

=== DC Defenders ===
Season(s)	Regular season	Playoffs
2020	Cardale Jones (5)	
2021–2022	Suspended operations	
2023	Jordan Ta'amu (10)	Jordan Ta'amu (2)
2024	Jordan Ta'amu (10)	
2025	Jordan Ta'amu (9) / Mike DiLiello (1)	Jordan Ta'amu (2)
2026	Jordan Ta'amu (8) / Spencer Sanders (1) / Jason Bean (1)	Jason Bean (2)

=== Louisville Kings ===
Season(s)	Regular season	Playoffs
2026	Jason Bean (4) / Chandler Rogers (6)	Chandler Rogers (2)

=== Orlando Storm ===
Season(s)	Regular season	Playoffs
2026	Jack Plummer (10)	Jack Plummer (1)

=== St. Louis Battlehawks ===
Season(s)	Regular season	Playoffs
2020	Jordan Ta'amu (5)	
2021–2022	Suspended operations	
2023	A. J. McCarron (9) / Nick Tiano (1)	
2024	A. J. McCarron (8) / Manny Wilkins (2)	A. J. McCarron (1)
2025	Manny Wilkins (4) / Max Duggan (5) / Brandon Silvers (1)	Max Duggan (1)
2026	Brandon Silvers (3) / Harrison Frost (3) / Luis Perez (4)	Luis Perez (1)

== Defunct UFL teams ==
=== Birmingham Stallions ===
Season(s)	Regular season	Playoffs
2022	J'Mar Smith (7) / Alex McGough (3)	J'Mar Smith (2)
2023	Alex McGough (9) / J'Mar Smith (1)	Alex McGough (2)
2024	Adrian Martinez (7) / Matt Corral (3)	Adrian Martinez (2)
2025	Alex McGough (2) / Matt Corral (2) / Case Cookus (3) / J'Mar Smith (3)	J'Mar Smith (1)
2026	Matt Corral (4) / Dorian Thompson-Robinson (6)	

=== Houston Gamblers ===
Season(s)	Regular season
Houston Gamblers
2022	Clayton Thorson (7) / Kenji Bahar (3)
2023	Kenji Bahar (9) / Terry Wilson (1)
Houston Roughnecks
2024	Reid Sinnett (5) / Jarrett Guarantano (3) / Nolan Henderson (2)
2025	Anthony Brown (3) / Nolan Henderson (1) / Jalan McClendon (6)
Houston Gamblers
2026	Nolan Henderson (4) / Hunter Dekkers (4) / Taulia Tagovailoa (1) / John Rhys Plumlee (1)

=== Memphis Showboats ===
Season(s)	Regular season
2023	Cole Kelley (8) / Brady White (2)
2024	Case Cookus (6) / Troy Williams (3) / Josh Love (1)
2025	E. J. Perry (4) / Troy Williams (2) / Dresser Winn (4)

=== Michigan Panthers ===
Season(s)	Regular season	Playoffs
2022	Shea Patterson (5) / Paxton Lynch (3) / Josh Love (2)	
2023	Josh Love (9) / E. J. Perry (1)	E. J. Perry (1)
2024	E. J. Perry (4) / Danny Etling (4) / Brian Lewerke (2)	Danny Etling (1)
2025	Bryce Perkins (6) / Danny Etling (3) / Rocky Lombardi (1)	Bryce Perkins (2)

=== San Antonio Brahmas ===
Season(s)	Regular season	Playoffs
2023	Jack Coan (7) / Reid Sinnett (1) / Jawon Pass (1) / Kurt Benkert (1)	
2024	Quinten Dormady (6) / Chase Garbers (4)	Chase Garbers (2)
2025	Kellen Mond (7) / Kevin Hogan (3)	

== Defunct XFL teams ==
=== Houston Roughnecks ===
Season(s)	Regular season	Playoffs
2020	P. J. Walker (5)	
2021–2022	Suspended operations	
2023	Brandon Silvers (8) / Cole McDonald (2)	Brandon Silvers (1)

=== Los Angeles Wildcats ===
Season(s)	Regular season
2020	Josh Johnson (4) / Chad Kanoff (1)

=== Orlando Guardians ===
Season(s)	Regular season
New York Guardians
2020	Matt McGloin (3) / Luis Perez (2)
2021–2022	Suspended operations
Orlando Guardians
2023	Paxton Lynch (5) / Quinten Dormady (4) / Deondre Francois (1)

=== Seattle Sea Dragons ===
Season(s)	Regular season	Playoffs
Seattle Dragons
2020	Brandon Silvers (4) / B. J. Daniels (1)	
2021–2022	Suspended operations	
Seattle Sea Dragons
2023	Ben DiNucci (10)	Ben DiNucci (1)

=== Vegas Vipers ===
Season(s)	Regular season
Tampa Bay Vipers
2020	Taylor Cornelius (4) / Aaron Murray (1)
2021–2022	Suspended operations
Vegas Vipers
2023	Luis Perez (4) / Jalan McClendon (4) / Brett Hundley (2)

== Defunct USFL teams ==
=== New Jersey Generals ===
Season(s)	Regular season	Playoffs
2022	Luis Perez (6) / De'Andre Johnson (4)	Luis Perez (1)
2023	De'Andre Johnson (7) / Kyle Lauletta (3)	

=== New Orleans Breakers ===
Season(s)	Regular season	Playoffs
2022	Kyle Sloter (9) / Zach Smith (1)	Kyle Sloter (1)
2023	McLeod Bethel-Thompson (10)	McLeod Bethel-Thompson (1)

=== Philadelphia Stars ===
Season(s)	Regular season	Playoffs
2022	Case Cookus (7) / Bryan Scott (3)	Case Cookus (2)
2023	Case Cookus (10)	

=== Pittsburgh Maulers ===
Season(s)	Regular season	Playoffs
2022	Vad Lee (4) / Josh Love (3) / Kyle Lauletta (2) / Roland Rivers III (1)	
2023	Troy Williams (8) / James Morgan (2)	Troy Williams (2)

=== Tampa Bay Bandits ===
Season(s)	Regular season
2022	Jordan Ta'amu (10)
