= Starting quarterback =

A starting quarterback is the quarterback on a gridiron football team that is in the team's starting lineup.

== Lists of starting quarterbacks ==
- List of starting quarterbacks in the National Football League
- Lists of starting quarterbacks in the USFL
- Lists of starting quarterbacks in the XFL
