= Eric Garror =

American football player (born 2000)

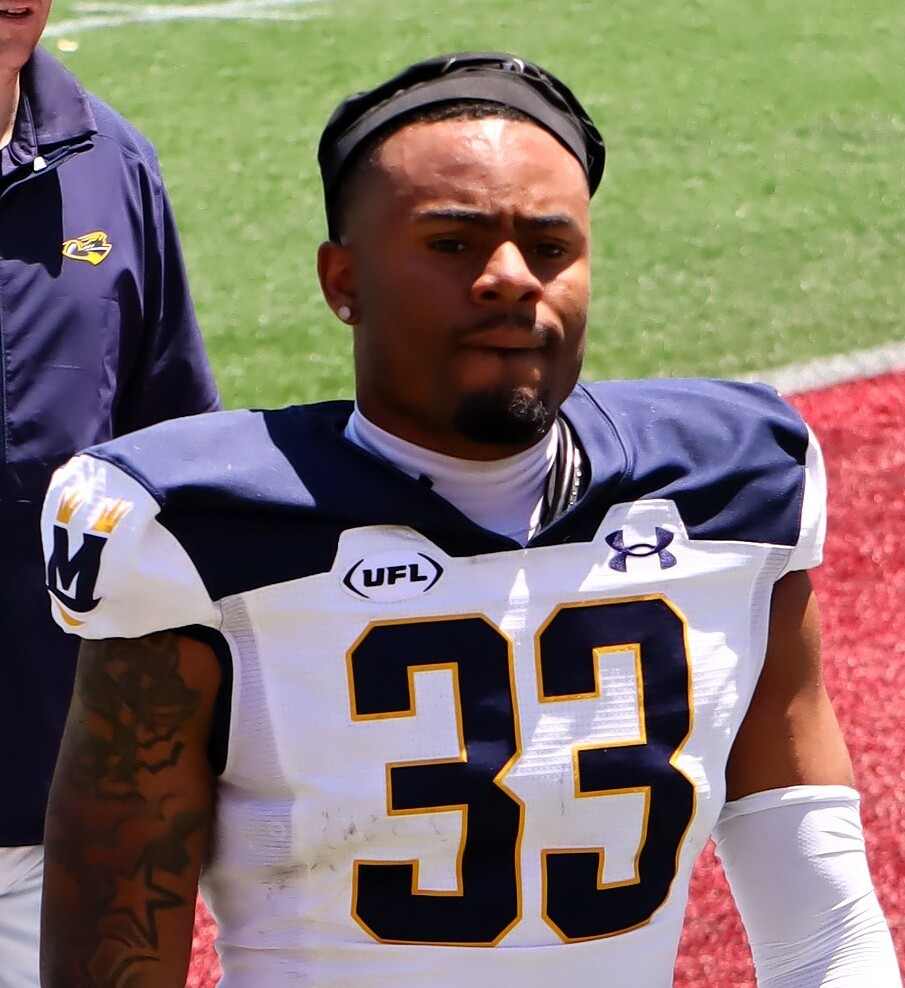
- Garror with the Memphis Showboats in 2025

No. 7 – Louisville Kings
- Position: Cornerback
- Roster status: Active

Personal information
- Born: March 31, 2000 (age 26); Mobile, Alabama, U.S.
- Listed height: 5 ft 8 in (1.73 m)
- Listed weight: 187 lb (85 kg)

Career information
- High school: McGill–Toolen (Mobile, Alabama)
- College: Louisiana (2018–2022)
- NFL draft: 2023: undrafted

Career history
- Tennessee Titans (2023); Seattle Seahawks (2024)*; Memphis Showboats (2025); Louisville Kings (2026–present)
- * Offseason or practice squad member only

Awards and highlights
- UFL champion (2026); First-team All-Sun Belt (2022); Second-team All-Sun Belt (2021); Third-team All-Sun Belt (2020)

Career NFL statistics
- Total tackles: 22
- Pass deflections: 2
- Return yards: 159
- Stats at Pro Football Reference

Eric Kyleed Cameron Garror (born March 31, 2000) is an American professional football cornerback for the Louisville Kings of the United Football League (UFL). He played college football for the Louisiana Ragin' Cajuns.

== Early life ==
Garror was born on March 31, 2000, in Mobile, Alabama. He attended McGill–Toolen Catholic High School where he lettered in football and in basketball. During high school, he was part of the AHSAA All-State team and was an All-Coastal Alabama performer. He finished his senior season with 29 tackles and 4 interceptions while on defense and also finished with 220 receiving yards and 2 touchdowns. He originally committed to play for the Richmond Spiders but he instead committed to Louisiana.

== College career ==
Garror played in 13 or 14 games during his true freshman season. He was also one of only two players in the team that had a sack, interception, and a pass defended all in the 2018 season. Garror started in all 14 games for the 2019 season while playing cornerback and serving as the primary punt returner. He was ranked third in the Sun Belt and 30th in punt return yards per game in FBS with 6.7. He was named defensive MVP after the 2020 LendingTree Bowl (January) where he accounted seven tackles and half of a tackle for loss. Garror earned third team All-Sun Belt Conference honors in the 2020 season after starting and appearing in all 10 games along with completing 23 tackles, 3 interceptions and 3 pass breakups. Garror earned second team All-Sun Belt Conference honors in the 2021 season. During that season, he averaged just under six yards per punt return. During the 2022 season, Garror was named the Sun Belt Conference Special Teams Player of the Week after their Week 1 game against Southeastern Louisiana where he returned a second quarter punt of 83 yards for a touchdown which was the second of his career.

== Professional career ==
Pre-draft measurables
Height	Weight	Arm length	Hand span	Wingspan	40-yard dash	10-yard split	20-yard split	20-yard shuttle	Three-cone drill	Vertical jump	Broad jump	Bench press
5 ft 7 7/8 in (1.72 m)	174 lb (79 kg)	29 1/4 in (0.74 m)	8 3/8 in (0.21 m)	5 ft 10 3/8 in (1.79 m)	4.57 s	1.50 s	2.61 s	4.29 s	6.97 s	33 in (0.84 m)	9 ft 5 in (2.87 m)	10 reps
All values from Pro Day

=== Tennessee Titans ===
After not being selected in the 2023 NFL draft, Garror signed with the Tennessee Titans as an undrafted free agent on May 15, 2023. He was waived by Tennessee on August 29, but was later re-signed to their practice squad. Garror was promoted to the active roster on October 28. As a rookie, Garror appeared in 12 games and made four starts. He had 22 total tackles (19 solo) and two passes defended to go with some punt return duties.

Garror was waived by the Titans on August 27, 2024.

=== Seattle Seahawks ===
On October 16, 2024, Garror signed with the Seattle Seahawks' practice squad. He was released by the Seahawks on October 22.

=== Memphis Showboats ===
On January 31, 2025, Garror signed with the Memphis Showboats of the United Football League (UFL).

=== Louisville Kings ===
On January 13, 2026, Garror was selected by the Louisville Kings in the 2026 UFL draft.
