= Matt McCrane =

American football player (born 1994)

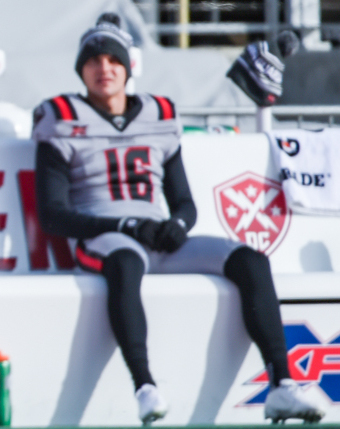
- McCrane with the New York Guardians in 2020

No. 16 – DC Defenders
- Position: Placekicker
- Roster status: Active

Personal information
- Born: September 8, 1994 (age 32); Brownwood, Texas, U.S.
- Listed height: 5 ft 10 in (1.78 m)
- Listed weight: 176 lb (80 kg)

Career information
- High school: Brownwood
- College: Kansas State (2014–2017)
- NFL draft: 2018: undrafted

Career history
- Arizona Cardinals (2018)*; Oakland Raiders (2018); Arizona Cardinals (2018); Pittsburgh Steelers (2018); New York Guardians (2020); Cleveland Browns (2020–2021)*; Arizona Cardinals (2021)*; Philadelphia Eagles (2021)*; DC Defenders (2023–2024); Detroit Lions (2024)*; DC Defenders (2025–present)
- * Offseason or practice squad member only

Awards and highlights
- UFL champion (2025); First-team All-Big 12 (2017)

Career NFL statistics
- Field goals: 8
- Field goal attempts: 12
- Field goal%: 66.7%
- Field goal long: 47
- Touchbacks: 5
- Stats at Pro Football Reference

Matthew McCrane (born September 8, 1994) is an American professional football placekicker for the DC Defenders of the United Football League (UFL). He played college football for the Kansas State Wildcats. He was signed by the Arizona Cardinals as an undrafted free agent in 2018. He has also played for the Oakland Raiders, Pittsburgh Steelers, New York Guardians, and Cleveland Browns.

== Early life ==
McCrane attended and played high school football at Brownwood High School. While playing for the Lions, McCrane converted on 41 of 44 extra points and 7 of 12 field goals, including the longest in school history at 52 yards.

== College career ==
McCrane attended and played college football at Kansas State University for head coach Bill Snyder. From 2014 to 2017, he converted 133-of-134 extra point attempts and 57-of-66 field goal attempts. McCrane ranks #2 in Big XII history and #7 in NCAA history for Career Field Goal Percentage. (86.4%)

=== College statistics ===
Matt McCrane
Year	School	Conf	Class	Pos	G	XPM	XPA	XP%	FGM	FGA	FG%	Pts
2014	Kansas State	Big 12	FR	K	12	41	42	97.6	18	19	94.7	95
2015	Kansas State	Big 12	SO	K	5	15	15	100.0	7	7	100.0	36
2016	Kansas State	Big 12	JR	K	8	29	29	100.0	11	14	78.6	62
2017	Kansas State	Big 12	SR	K	13	48	48	100.0	21	26	80.8	111
Career	Kansas State					133	134	99.3	57	66	86.4	304

== Professional career ==
Pre-draft measurables
Height	Weight	Arm length	Hand span	Wingspan
5 ft 10 in (1.78 m)	165 lb (75 kg)	29 1/2 in (0.75 m)	9 in (0.23 m)	6 ft 0 1/2 in (1.84 m)
All values from Pro Day

=== Arizona Cardinals (first stint) ===
After going undrafted in the 2018 NFL draft, McCrane signed with Arizona Cardinals. He was released on September 1, 2018.

=== Oakland Raiders ===
McCrane was signed by the Oakland Raiders on September 25, 2018. On September 30, against the Cleveland Browns, McCrane converted three of five field goal attempts and four extra points. He converted the game winning field goal for the Raiders in his NFL debut. McCrane was waived by the Raiders on October 23, after the team signed Daniel Carlson.

=== Arizona Cardinals (second stint) ===
McCrane was re-signed by the Cardinals to their practice squad on October 26, 2018. McCrane was released by the Cardinals on October 30. He was re-signed to the active roster on November 17, following an injury to Phil Dawson. McCrane handled the kicking duties in the Cardinals' 23–21 loss to the Oakland Raiders, making all three of his extra point attempts, and was waived the following day on November 19.

=== Pittsburgh Steelers ===
On December 28, 2018, the Pittsburgh Steelers signed McCrane after placekicker Chris Boswell was placed on injured reserve. McCrane made all three field goal attempts and his sole extra point attempt in the Steelers final regular season game on December 30, in a 16–13 win against the Cincinnati Bengals. McCrane was released by the Steelers on May 9, 2019.

=== New York Guardians ===
McCrane was drafted by the New York Guardians in the 2020 XFL Supplemental Draft on November 22, 2019. He had his contract terminated when the league suspended operations on April 10, 2020.

=== Cleveland Browns ===
McCrane was signed to the Cleveland Browns' practice squad on September 22, 2020. McCrane was signed to a reserve/futures contract by the Browns on January 18, 2021. He was waived by Cleveland on May 11.

=== Arizona Cardinals (third stint) ===
On September 16, 2021, McCrane was signed to the Arizona Cardinals' practice squad. The Cardinals released him on September 21.

=== Philadelphia Eagles ===
On December 25, 2021, McCrane was signed to the Philadelphia Eagles practice squad. He spent time on and off the practice squad before being released on January 10, 2022.

=== DC Defenders (first stint) ===
McCrane signed with the DC Defenders on January 17, 2023. He re-signed with the team on January 22, 2024.

On April 13, 2024, McCrane experienced the best day in his career to date, kicking field goals of 58, 54 and 49 yards (the last being a game-winning kick) in a victory over the Arlington Renegades. His contract was terminated on September 17, to sign with an NFL team.

=== Detroit Lions ===
On September 18, 2024, McCrane signed with the Detroit Lions' practice squad. He was released by Detroit on October 7.

=== DC Defenders (second stint) ===
On December 2, 2024, McCrane re-signed with the Defenders. In Week 1 of the 2026 season, McCrane made the UFL's first ever 4 point field goal, earning player of the week honors for the second time in his UFL career. During the 2026 season, McCrane made four field goals from 60 yards or longer—two in the regular season and two in the postseason—setting the professional-football single-season record for 60-yard field goals.

== Career statistics ==
=== NFL ===
Year	Team	GP	Field goals				Points
Year	Team	GP	FGA	FGM	Lng	Pct	Points
2018	OAK	3	9	5	44	55.6	**33**
2018	ARI	1	0	0	-	-	3
2018	PIT	1	3	3	**47**	**100.0**	10
Career		5	12	8	47	66.7	46

=== XFL/UFL ===
Legend
	League champion
	Led the league
**Bold**	Career high

==== Regular season ====
Year	Team	League	GP	Field goals				Points
Year	Team	League	GP	FGA	FGM	Lng	Pct	Points
2020	NY	XFL	5	8	8	53	**100.0**	24
2023	DC	XFL	10	16	12	50	75.0	36
2024	DC	UFL	10	20	**16**	58	80.0	48
2025	DC	UFL	10	20	14	53	70.0	42
2026	DC	UFL	9	24	18	**60**	75.0	80
Career			44	88	68	60	77.2	230

==== Postseason ====
Year	Team	League	GP	Field goals				Points
Year	Team	League	GP	FGA	FGM	Lng	Pct	Points
2023	DC	XFL	2	1	1	24	100.0	3
2025	DC	UFL	2	5	5	41	100.0	15
Career			4	6	6	41	100.0	18
