= Ian Wheeler (American football) =

American football player (born 2001)

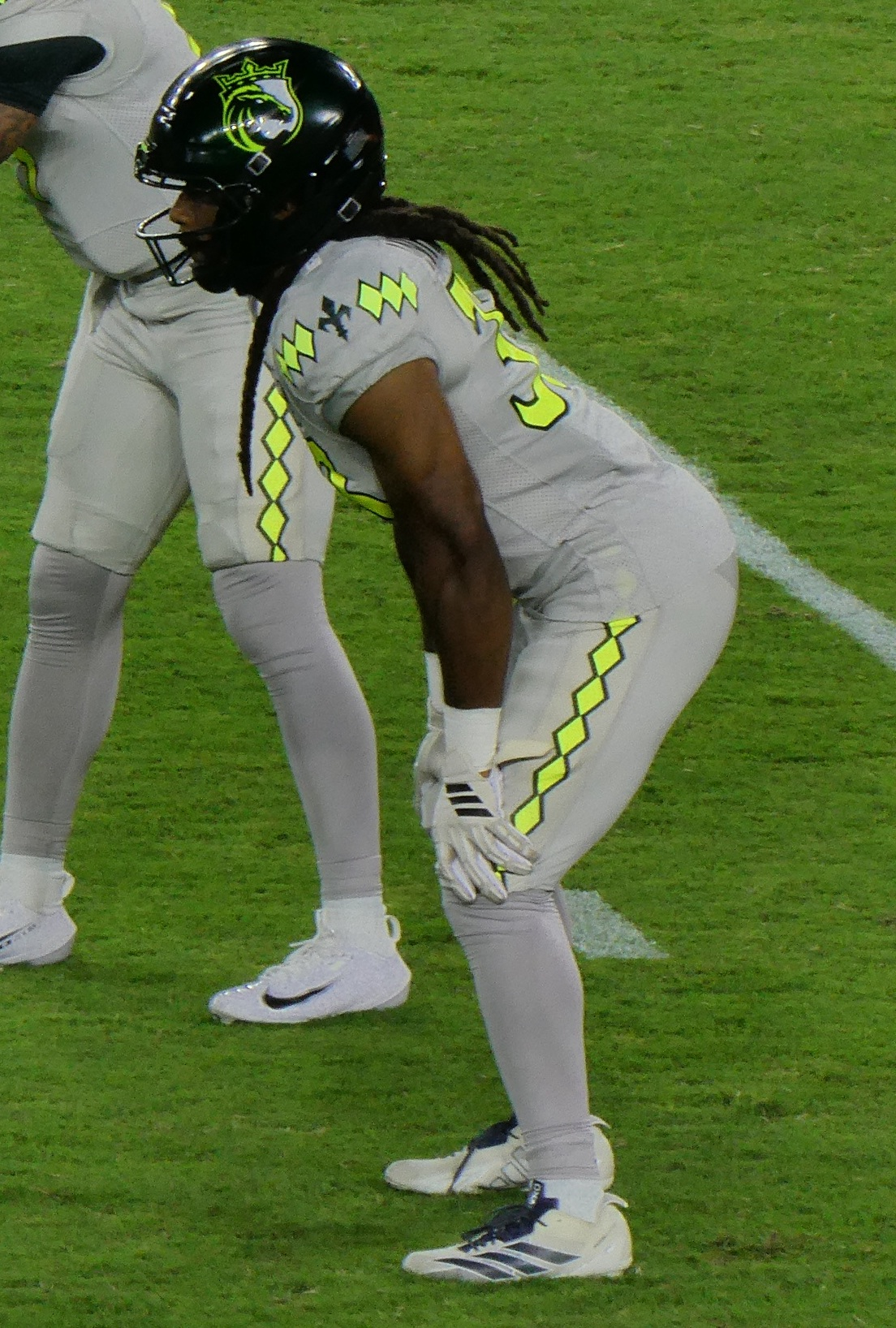
- Wheeler with the Louisville Kings in 2026

Profile
- Position: Running back

Personal information
- Born: September 15, 2001 (age 25); Houston, Texas, U.S.
- Listed height: 5 ft 10 in (1.78 m)
- Listed weight: 205 lb (93 kg)

Career information
- High school: St. Thomas (Houston)
- College: Howard (2019–2023)
- NFL draft: 2024: undrafted

Career history
- Chicago Bears (2024); New Orleans Saints (2025)*; Louisville Kings (2026); Buffalo Bills (2026)*; Philadelphia Eagles (2026)*
- * Offseason or practice squad member only

Awards and highlights
- UFL champion (2026); United Bowl Most Valuable Player (2026); 3× Second-team All-MEAC (2021, 2022, 2023) (Note: Selected at Running back in 2021. Selected at all-purpose position in 2022 and 2023); Third-team All-MEAC (2021) (Note: Selected at all-purpose position.)
- Stats at Pro Football Reference

Ian Wheeler (born September 15, 2001) is an American professional football running back. He played college football at Howard. He was named the 2026 United Bowl Most Valuable Player.

== College career ==
Wheeler played college football at Howard from 2019 to 2023. He rushed for 1,154 yards and 14 touchdowns on 177 attempts. He was named second-team All-MEAC from 2021–2023.

He studied Psychology at Howard. Although he was accepted into Howard University College of Medicine, he deferred enrolling to play in the NFL.

== Professional career ==
Pre-draft measurables
Height	Weight	Arm length	Hand span	Wingspan	40-yard dash	10-yard split	20-yard split	20-yard shuttle	Three-cone drill	Vertical jump	Broad jump	Bench press
5 ft 9 7/8 in (1.77 m)	203 lb (92 kg)	31 3/8 in (0.80 m)	9 1/4 in (0.23 m)	6 ft 1 3/8 in (1.86 m)	4.41 s	1.57 s	2.62 s	4.52 s	7.40 s	38.5 in (0.98 m)	10 ft 5 in (3.18 m)	17 reps
All values from HBCU Combine/Pro Day

=== Chicago Bears ===
After going undrafted in the 2024 NFL draft, Wheeler signed with the Chicago Bears of the National Football League (NFL). On August 24, 2024, Wheeler was placed on injured reserve due to a knee injury suffered in the team's final preseason matchup against the Kansas City Chiefs.

Wheeler was released by the Bears as a part of preliminary roster cuts on August 25, 2025.

=== New Orleans Saints ===
On November 25, 2025, Wheeler was signed to the New Orleans Saints' practice squad. He was released by the Saints on December 2.

=== Louisville Kings ===
On February 25, 2026, Wheeler signed with the Louisville Kings of the United Football League (UFL). During the first four weeks of the season, Wheeler had a limited role with the team, recording six carries for five yards. Following the release of starting running back Benny Snell after Week 4, a game Wheeler missed, he saw an expanded role in the offense. In Week 5 against the Dallas Renegades, Wheeler rushed for 62 yards and set a UFL single-game record with four rushing touchdowns on 13 carries. Louisville went on to win six of its final seven regular-season games, with Wheeler making his lone start of the season in Week 10, rushing for a season-high 99 yards on 14 carries and a touchdown in a 42–27 victory over the Columbus Aviators. Wheeler finished the regular season with 371 rushing yards and six touchdowns on 68 carries, ranking second in the UFL in rushing touchdowns. He also caught six passes for 36 yards and contributed on special teams, returning 12 kickoffs for 326 yards, which ranked among the league's top ten. The Kings finished the regular season 6–4 and earned the No. 3 seed in the UFL playoffs. In the semifinal round against the St. Louis Battlehawks, Wheeler rushed for 89 yards on seven carries, including a 51-yard go-ahead touchdown run in the fourth quarter, helping Louisville secure a 29–20 victory. In the 2026 United Bowl, Wheeler was named the game's Most Valuable Player after rushing for 81 yards and a touchdown, including a go-ahead 44-yard touchdown run in the fourth quarter, while also adding a 28-yard kickoff return in Louisville's 27–20 victory over the DC Defenders.

=== Buffalo Bills ===
On June 18, 2026, Wheeler signed a one-year contract with the Buffalo Bills. On August 30, he was waived by Buffalo as a part of final roster cuts.

=== Philadelphia Eagles ===
On October 15, 2026, Wheeler signed with the Philadelphia Eagles' practice squad. On October 20, he was released by the Eagles.

== Career statistics ==
=== UFL ===
==== Regular season ====
Legend
	Championship Game MVP
	League champion
**Bold**	Career high

Year	Team	Games		Rushing				Receiving			
Year	Team	GP	GS	Att	Yds	Avg	TD	Rec	Yds	Avg	TD
2026	LOU	9	1	68	371	5.5	6	6	36	6.0	0
Career		9	1	68	371	5.5	6	6	36	6.0	0

==== Postseason ====
Year	Team	Games		Rushing				Receiving			
Year	Team	GP	GS	Att	Yds	Avg	TD	Rec	Yds	Avg	TD
2026	LOU	2	0	17	170	10.0	2	1	3	3.0	0
Career		2	0	17	170	10.0	2	1	3	3.0	0

=== College ===
Year	Team	Games		Rushing				Receiving			
Year	Team	GP	GS	Att	Yds	Avg	TD	Rec	Yds	Avg	TD
2019	Howard	10	0	0	0	0.0	0	0	0	0.0	0
2020	Howard	2	0	3	15	5.0	1	0	0	0.0	0
2021	Howard	8	0	**65**	**443**	6.8	**8**	5	31	6.2	0
2022	Howard	11	0	57	316	5.5	3	**9**	84	9.3	**1**
2023	Howard	11	0	52	380	**7.3**	2	**9**	**119**	**13.2**	0
Career		42	0	177	1,154	6.5	14	23	234	10.2	1
