= Briley Moore =

American football player (born 1998)

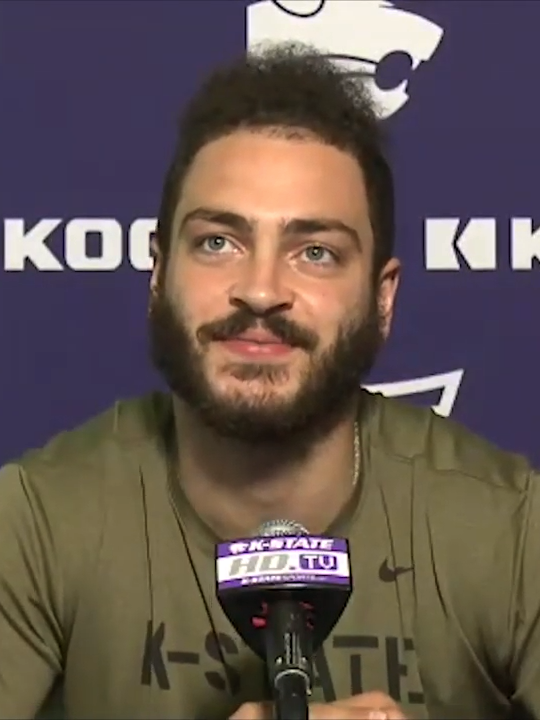
- Moore in 2020

No. 88 – DC Defenders
- Position: Tight end
- Roster status: Active

Personal information
- Born: January 13, 1998 (age 28); Blue Springs, Missouri, U.S.
- Listed height: 6 ft 4 in (1.93 m)
- Listed weight: 258 lb (117 kg)

Career information
- High school: Blue Springs South
- College: Northern Iowa; Kansas State
- NFL draft: 2021: undrafted

Career history
- Tennessee Titans (2021); DC Defenders (2023–2025); Columbus Aviators (2026)*; DC Defenders (2026–present)
- * Offseason or practice squad member only

Awards and highlights
- UFL champion (2025); Second-team All-Big 12 (2020); First-team All-MVFC (2018)

Briley Moore-McKinney (born January 13, 1998) is an American professional football tight end for the DC Defenders of the United Football League (UFL). He played college football at Kansas State and Northern Iowa.

== Early life ==
Moore grew up in Blue Springs, Missouri, and attended Blue Springs South High School, where he played football and basketball. He struggled with injuries in both sports in each of his first three years of high school. As a senior moore was named first-team All-State after catching 37 passes for 653 yards and 15 touchdowns as Blue Springs South won a state championship.

== College career ==
Moore moved from the wide receiver position to tight end during his freshman season and had four receptions for 60 yards and one touchdown. He was named honorable mention All-Missouri Valley Football Conference (MVFC) after catching 38 passes for 494 yards in his sophomore season. As a junior, Moore led the Panthers with 39 receptions, 536 yards and four touchdowns and was named first-team All-MVFC. He suffered a season-ending shoulder injury in the first game of his senior season against Iowa State. After the season Moore announced we would be entering the transfer portal.

Moore transferred to Kansas State as a graduate transfer after considering offers from Baylor and Missouri. In his lone season with the Wildcats he was named second-team All-Big 12 Conference after catching 22 passes for 338 yards and three touchdowns.

== Professional career ==
Pre-draft measurables
Height	Weight	Arm length	Hand span	Wingspan	40-yard dash	10-yard split	20-yard split	20-yard shuttle	Three-cone drill	Vertical jump	Broad jump	Bench press
6 ft 4 1/4 in (1.94 m)	240 lb (109 kg)	31 in (0.79 m)	9 7/8 in (0.25 m)	6 ft 3 1/2 in (1.92 m)	4.64 s	1.63 s	2.65 s	4.37 s	7.24 s	37.5 in (0.95 m)	10 ft 3 in (3.12 m)	26 reps
All values from Pro Day

=== Tennessee Titans ===
Moore signed with the Tennessee Titans as an undrafted free agent shortly after the conclusion of the 2021 NFL draft. He suffered a torn anterior cruciate ligament (ACL) in practice during training camp and was placed on season-ending injured reserve on August 1, 2021. He was waived on August 17, 2022.

=== DC Defenders (first stint) ===
On November 17, 2022, Moore was drafted by the DC Defenders of the XFL. He was placed on injured reserve on April 16, 2024. He was activated on May 21. He re-signed with the team on October 25, 2024.

=== Columbus Aviators ===
On January 13, 2026, Moore was selected by the Columbus Aviators in the 2026 UFL draft.

=== DC Defenders (second stint) ===
On February 11, 2026, Moore was traded to the DC Defenders in exchange for Patrick Jenkins.
