= Tarik Black (American football) =

American football player (born 1998)

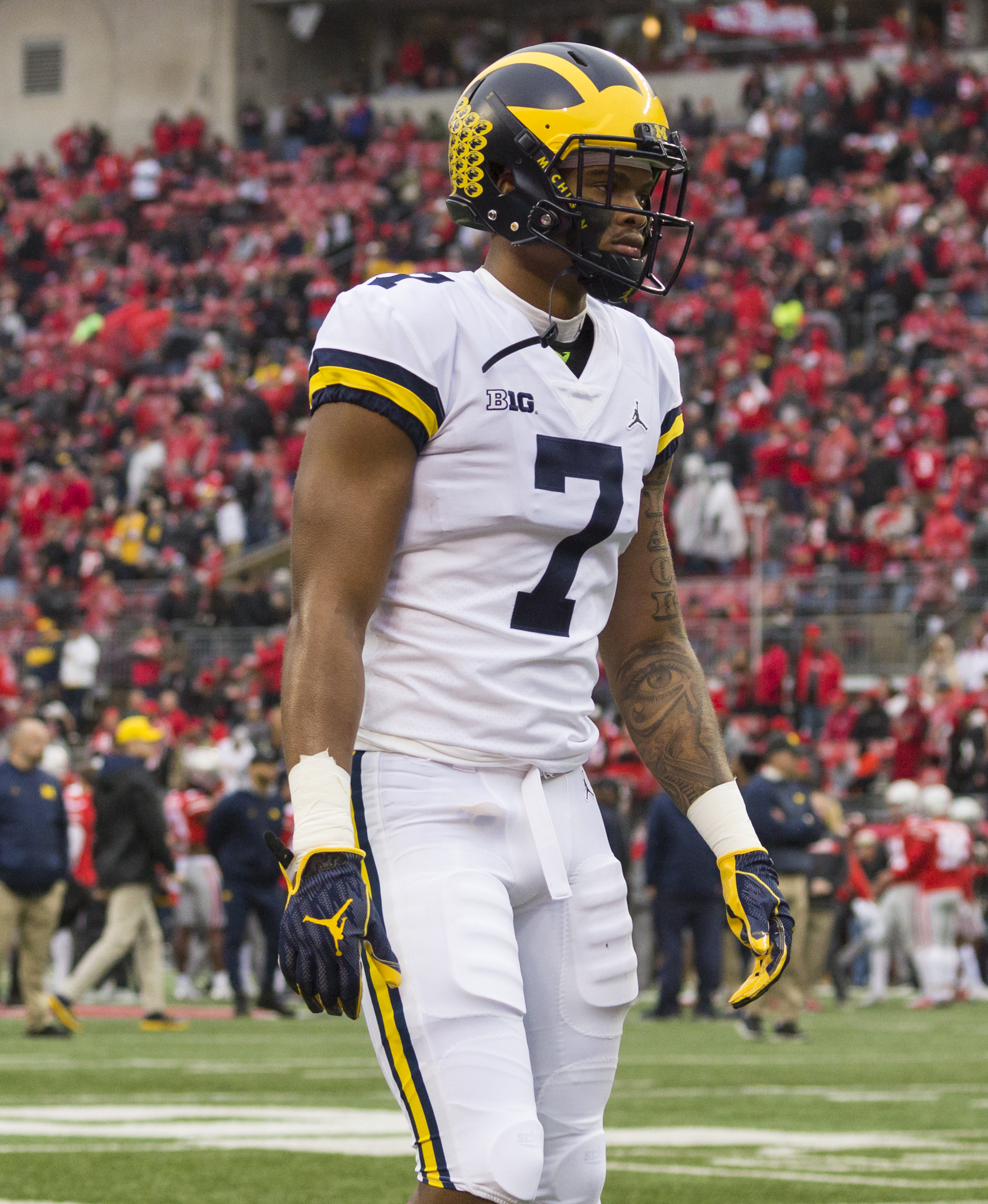
- Black with the Michigan Wolverines in 2018

Profile
- Position: Wide receiver

Personal information
- Born: February 10, 1998 (age 28); Hamden, Connecticut, U.S.
- Listed height: 6 ft 3 in (1.91 m)
- Listed weight: 213 lb (97 kg)

Career information
- High school: Cheshire Academy (Cheshire, Connecticut)
- College: Michigan (2017–2019); Texas (2020)
- NFL draft: 2021: undrafted

Career history
- Indianapolis Colts (2021)*; New York Jets (2021–2022); Baltimore Ravens (2022–2023)*; Pittsburgh Steelers (2024)*; Miami Dolphins (2024)*; Louisville Kings (2026); Detroit Lions (2026)*
- * Offseason or practice squad member only

Awards and highlights
- UFL champion (2026)

Career NFL statistics as of 2025
- Receptions: 1
- Receiving yards: 10
- Stats at Pro Football Reference

Tarik Black (born February 10, 1998) is an American professional football wide receiver. He played college football for the Michigan Wolverines and Texas Longhorns. Black signed with the Indianapolis Colts as an undrafted free agent after the 2021 NFL draft and spent time with the New York Jets, Baltimore Ravens, Pittsburgh Steelers, Miami Dolphins, and Louisville Kings.

With the Kings he won the 2026 United Bowl.

== Early life ==
Black attended Cheshire Academy in Cheshire, Connecticut. He was a four-star recruit ranked as the No. 81 high school player in the country by ESPN. He was also rated as the top recruit in Connecticut and was invited to play in the U.S. Army All-American Bowl.

Black received scholarship offers from Auburn and Alabama, among others. In December 2016, in a Facebook live broadcast, he committed to play college football at the University of Michigan.

== College career ==
Black enrolled early at Michigan in January 2017. He participated in Michigan's spring practice where he impressed observers.

On September 2, 2017, Black started at wide receiver as a true freshman in Michigan's season opener against Florida. He scored a touchdown on his first collegiate reception and had two receptions for 83 yards in the game. During the fourth quarter of the Wolverines' third game of the season against Air Force, Black was injured and left with a broken left foot. At the time of his injury, he led the team in receiving yards. He did not return for the rest of the season, finishing with 11 catches for 149 yards and one touchdown in three games.

Just before the start of his sophomore season in 2018, Black suffered another, similar injury, this time fracturing his right foot. He saw his first playing time of the year on November 3 against Penn State, and recorded his first catch of the year two weeks later against Indiana. He finished his sophomore season with just four catches for 35 yards and no touchdowns.

Black was healthy in the 2019 season, but had to compete for playing time with Nico Collins, Donovan Peoples-Jones and Ronnie Bell. For the year, he played in 11 games and had 25 receptions for 323 yards and 1 touchdown. Black entered the transfer portal on December 13, 2019.

On April 28, 2020, Black announced he had decided to grad transfer to the University of Texas at Austin. In one season at Texas, he played in 8 games, with one start, recording one touchdown and 10 receptions for 240 yards. His only start came in the first game of the season, against UTEP, after which he lost the starting job to Brennan Eagles. He did not play in his final game at Texas and opted not to play in the Alamo Bowl, even though Eagles also opted out meaning he would've gotten more playing time.

== Professional career ==
Pre-draft measurables
Height	Weight	Arm length	Hand span	Wingspan	40-yard dash	10-yard split	20-yard split	20-yard shuttle	Three-cone drill	Vertical jump	Broad jump	Bench press
6 ft 2 3/4 in (1.90 m)	213 lb (97 kg)	33 3/4 in (0.86 m)	9 3/4 in (0.25 m)	6 ft 7 in (2.01 m)	4.53 s	1.58 s	2.52 s	4.26 s	6.91 s	40.0 in (1.02 m)	11 ft 0 in (3.35 m)	15 reps
All values from Pro Day

=== Indianapolis Colts ===
Black signed with the Indianapolis Colts as an undrafted free agent on May 6, 2021. He was waived by Indianapolis on August 31, and was re-signed to the practice squad the next day. Black was released by the Colts on November 23.

=== New York Jets ===
On December 7, 2021, Black was signed to the New York Jets' practice squad. He was called up from the practice squad for the last game of the season against the Buffalo Bills and made his first career NFL catch.

Black signed a reserve/future contract with the Jets on January 10, 2022. On August 30, Black was waived by the Jets and was re-signed to the practice squad the following day. He was released by the Jets on December 6.

=== Baltimore Ravens ===
On January 3, 2023, Black was signed to the Baltimore Ravens' practice squad.

On April 19, 2023, Black re-signed with the Ravens. He was waived on August 29 as a part of final roster cuts Black was re-signed to their practice squad on September 26. He was released by Baltimore on October 27. Black was again re-signed to the team's practice squad on December 7. He was released again on January 17, 2024.

=== Pittsburgh Steelers ===
Black was signed by the Pittsburgh Steelers on July 31, 2024. He was waived/injured on August 13 and was released six days later with an injury settlement.

=== Miami Dolphins ===
On October 23, 2024, Black was signed to the Miami Dolphins' practice squad. He signed a reserve/future contract with Miami on January 7, 2025. On August 19, Black was waived by the Dolphins.

=== Louisville Kings ===
On January 14, 2026, Black was drafted by the Louisville Kings in Day 2 of the 2026 UFL draft. He played in mine regular season games, placed third on the team for receptions and receiving yards, and tied for first for receiving touchdowns. Black played in both playoff games and helped the Kings win the 2026 UFL Championship at the United Bowl.

=== Detroit Lions ===
On June 17, 2026, Black signed with the Detroit Lions. On August 3, he was released by the Lions. Two days later, Black was re-signed. On August 30, Black was waived by Detroit as a part of final roster cuts.
