= Cornell Powell =

American football player (born 1997)

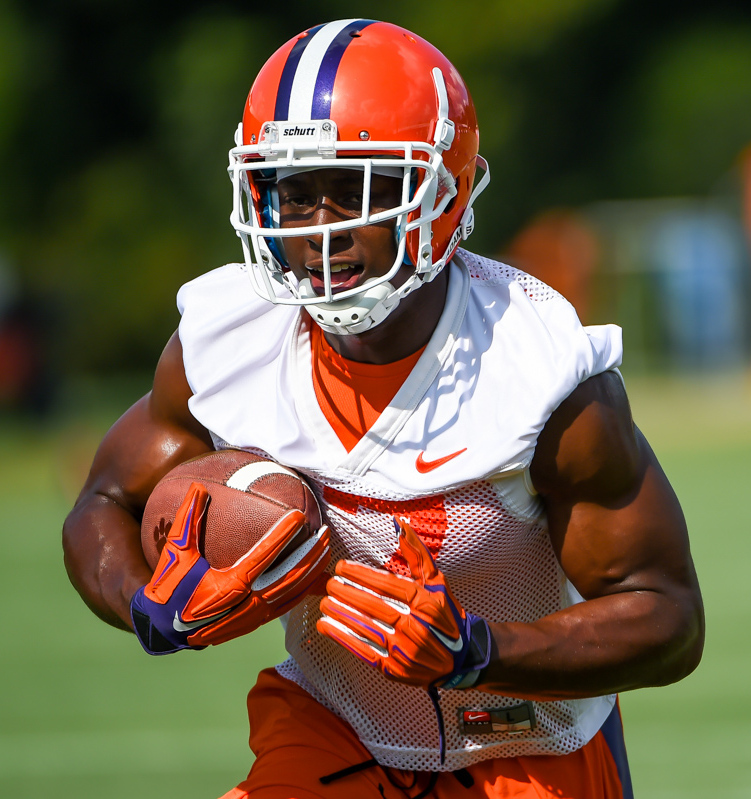
- Powell with the Clemson Tigers in 2016

Profile
- Position: Wide receiver

Personal information
- Born: October 30, 1997 (age 29); Greenville, North Carolina, U.S.
- Listed height: 6 ft 0 in (1.83 m)
- Listed weight: 217 lb (98 kg)

Career information
- High school: JH Rose (Greenville)
- College: Clemson (2016–2020)
- NFL draft: 2021: 5th round, 181st overall pick

Career history
- Kansas City Chiefs (2021–2024); Seattle Seahawks (2024)*; DC Defenders (2025); Houston Texans (2025)*; Pittsburgh Steelers (2025)*; DC Defenders (2026); Pittsburgh Steelers (2026)*
- * Offseason or practice squad member only

Awards and highlights
- 2× Super Bowl champion (LVII, LVIII); 2× CFP national champion (2016, 2018); UFL champion (2025); UFL receiving touchdowns leader (2025); Third-team All-ACC (2020)
- Stats at Pro Football Reference

Cornell Powell (born October 30, 1997) is an American professional football wide receiver. He played college football for the Clemson Tigers. Powell is the first player in history to win championships in the NCAA (2), UFL, and NFL (2).

== Early life ==
Powell attended JH Rose High School in Greenville, North Carolina. As a senior, he had 65 receptions for 1,557 yards and 38 total touchdowns. He committed to Clemson University to play college football.

== College career ==
Powell spent 2016 to 2019 as a backup receiver. He took a redshirt in 2018 after playing in only four games. During his career, he totaled 40 receptions for 329 yards and three touchdowns. He became a starter for the first time in his redshirt senior season in 2020. He finished the season with 53 receptions for 882 yards and seven touchdowns.

== Professional career ==
Pre-draft measurables
Height	Weight	Arm length	Hand span	Wingspan	40-yard dash	10-yard split	20-yard split	20-yard shuttle	Three-cone drill	Vertical jump	Broad jump	Bench press
6 ft 0 1/4 in (1.84 m)	204 lb (93 kg)	32 3/4 in (0.83 m)	9 7/8 in (0.25 m)	6 ft 6 3/4 in (2.00 m)	4.53 s	1.60 s	2.66 s	4.21 s	7.03 s	36.5 in (0.93 m)	10 ft 8 in (3.25 m)	16 reps
All values from NFL Combine/Pro Day

=== Kansas City Chiefs ===
Powell was selected by the Kansas City Chiefs in the fifth round (181st overall) of the 2021 NFL draft. He signed his four-year rookie contract on May 13, 2021. Powell was waived on August 31 and re-signed to the practice squad the next day. He signed a reserve/future contract with the Chiefs on February 2, 2022.

On August 30, Powell was waived by the Chiefs and again re-signed to the practice squad the next day. He was placed on the practice squad/injured list on January 3, 2023. Powell won Super Bowl LVII where the Chiefs defeated the Philadelphia Eagles. He signed a reserve/future contract on February 15.

On August 29, 2023, for the third consecutive year, Powell started the season as waived by the Chiefs and re-signed to the practice squad. He won a second consecutive Super Bowl when the Chiefs defeated the San Francisco 49ers in Super Bowl LVIII. His contract expired when the team's season ended on February 11, 2024.

On February 21, 2024, Powell re-signed with the Chiefs. He was waived on August 27. He was re-signed to the practice squad on October 22. He was released on November 19.

=== Seattle Seahawks ===
On November 26, 2024, Powell was signed to the Seattle Seahawks practice squad. He signed a reserve/future contract on January 6, 2025. Powell was waived by the Seahawks on February 22.

=== DC Defenders ===
On March 3, 2025, Powell signed with the DC Defenders of the United Football League (UFL). Powell led the league with seven receiving touchdowns, recording 418 yards on 29 receptions across nine games.

=== Houston Texans ===
On August 19, 2025, Powell signed with the Houston Texans. He was waived by the Texans on August 26 as part of final roster cuts.

=== Pittsburgh Steelers ===
On November 25, 2025, Powell was signed to the Pittsburgh Steelers' practice squad. He was released by the Steelers on December 2.

=== DC Defenders (second stint) ===
On January 15, 2026, Powell was selected by the DC Defenders in the 2026 UFL draft.

=== Pittsburgh Steelers (second stint) ===
On August 10, 2026, Powell signed with the Pittsburgh Steelers. On August 28, he was waived by the Steelers.

== Career statistics ==
=== NFL ===
Legend
	Won the Super Bowl
	Led the league
**Bold**	Career high

Year	Team	Games		Receiving				
Year	Team	GP	GS	Rec	Yds	Avg	Lng	TD
2021	KC	DNP						
2022	KC	3	0	—	—	—	—	—
2023	KC	DNP						
2024	KC	DNP						
Career		3	0	0	0	0.0	0	0

=== UFL ===
Year	Team	Games		Receiving				
Year	Team	GP	GS	Rec	Yds	Avg	Lng	TD
2025	DC	9	7	29	418	14.4	44	7
2026	DC	9	9	34	491	14.4	54	1
Career		18	16	63	909	14.4	54	8

=== College ===
Season	Team	Games		Receiving			
Season	Team	GP	GS	Rec	Yds	Avg	TD
2016	Clemson	9	0	12	87	7.3	0
2017	Clemson	14	0	8	57	7.1	1
2018	Clemson	4	0	5	63	12.6	0
2019	Clemson	15	0	15	122	8.1	2
2020	Clemson	12	12	53	882	16.6	7
Career		54	12	93	1,211	13.0	10
