= Spencer Sanders =

American football player (born 1999)

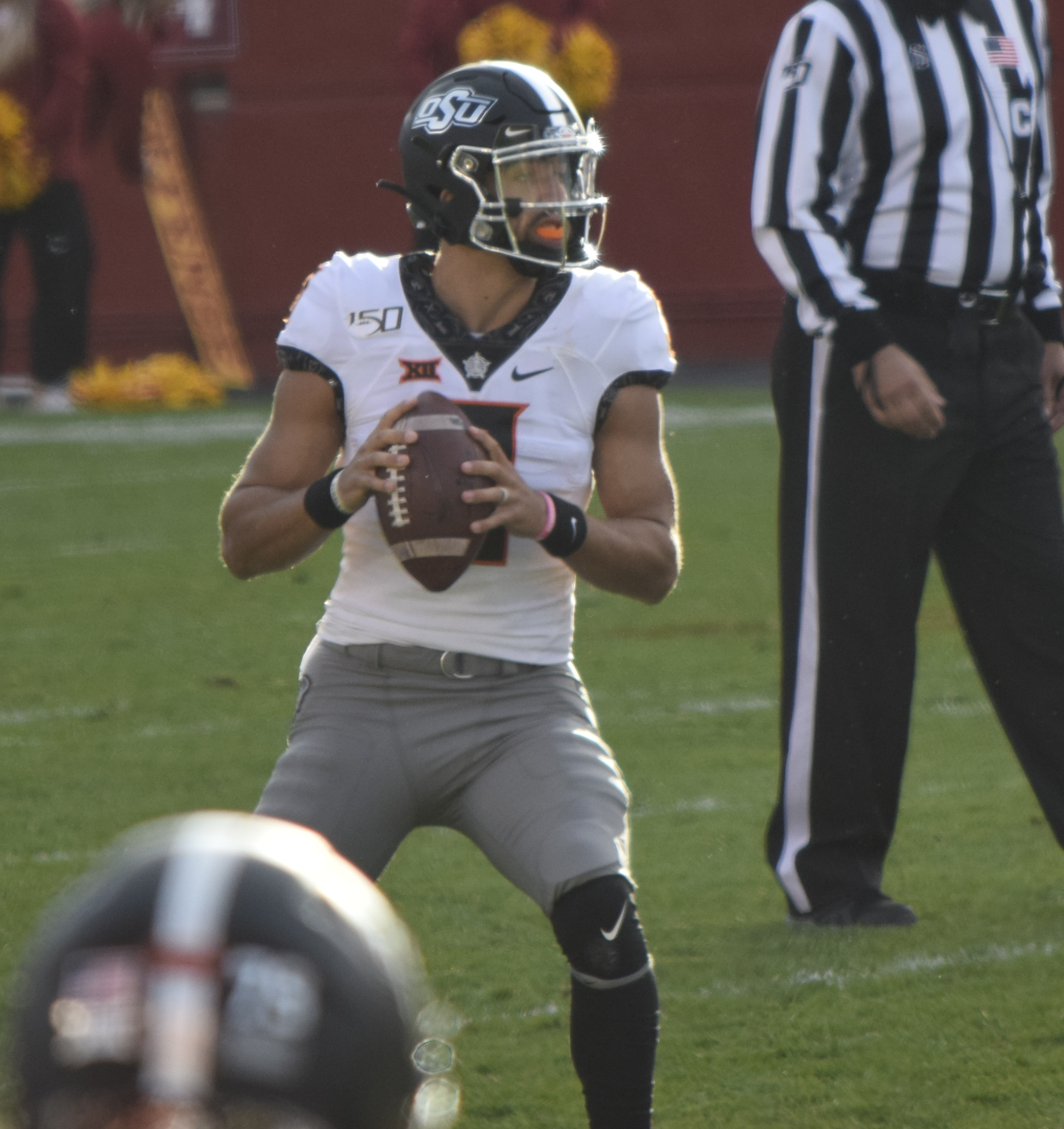
- Sanders with Oklahoma State in 2019

Profile
- Position: Quarterback

Personal information
- Born: December 15, 1999 (age 26); Dallas, Texas, U.S.
- Listed height: 6 ft 1 in (1.85 m)
- Listed weight: 205 lb (93 kg)

Career information
- High school: Billy Ryan (Denton, Texas)
- College: Oklahoma State (2018–2022); Ole Miss (2023)
- NFL draft: 2024: undrafted

Career history
- DC Defenders (2025–2026)

Awards and highlights
- UFL champion (2025); First-team All-Big 12 (2021); Big 12 Offensive Freshman of the Year (2019)

Spencer Sanders (born December 15, 1999) is an American professional football quarterback. He played college football for the Oklahoma State Cowboys and Ole Miss Rebels.

== Early life ==
Sanders grew up in Denton, Texas and attended Billy Ryan High School. He passed for 3,288 yards and 35 touchdowns along with 1,099 yards and 18 touchdowns on the ground in his junior season before tearing his ACL. Rated a four-star recruit, Sanders committed to play college football at Oklahoma State during his junior year over offers from Colorado, Ole Miss, North Carolina, Penn State and Texas A&M. As a senior, Sanders threw for 3,845 yards and 54 touchdowns and ran for 1,380 yards and 16 touchdowns and was named the Gatorade Player of the Year, the Associated Press Player of the Year, and Texas Mr. Football.

== College career ==
=== Oklahoma State ===
Sanders redshirted his true freshman season. After competing with Dru Brown throughout spring practice and summer training camp, Sanders was named the Cowboys starting quarterback just before the season opener. Sanders was named the Big 12 Conference Newcomer of the Week for week 2 after throwing for 250 yards and three touchdowns on 12 of 18 passing with 51 yards rushing in slightly more than one half of play against McNeese State. Sanders was named the Newcomer of the Week a second time after completing nine of 12 passes for 158 yards and two touchdowns while rushing for another 88 yards in a 34–27 win against TCU. The following game against Kansas Sanders suffered a torn ligament in his throwing hand, ending his redshirt freshman season. He threw for 2,065 yards with 16 touchdowns and 11 interceptions while rushing for 625 yards and two touchdowns and was named the conference Offensive Freshman of the Year.

Sanders suffered an ankle injury in the first quarter of 2020 season opening game against Tulsa and missed the following game. He finished the season with 2,007 passing yards with 14 touchdowns and eight interceptions. Sanders was named the MVP of the 2020 Cheez-It Bowl after passing for 305 yards and four touchdowns in a 37–34 win against the Miami Hurricanes.

Sanders missed the opener of his redshirt junior season against Missouri State after he tested positive for COVID-19. He passed for 214 yards and one touchdown and 93 yards and another touchdown in Oklahoma State's 37–33 rivalry game victory against Oklahoma. Sanders was named first team All-Big 12 after completing 243 of 392 pass attempts for 2,839 yards and 20 touchdown passes against 12 interceptions and 668 rushing yards with six touchdowns.

On December 5, 2022, it was reported by multiple sources that Sanders intended to enter the transfer portal.

=== Ole Miss ===
On January 19, 2023, Sanders transferred to Ole Miss. He served as the primary backup to Jaxson Dart during the 2023 season. Sanders made his Rebels debut in the season opener against Mercer, completing 8 of 14 passes for 134 yards and two touchdowns. He appeared in nine games during the season, completing 19 of 29 passes for 278 yards and three touchdowns while adding 45 rushing yards.

=== Statistics ===
Year	Team	Games			Passing								Rushing			
Year	Team	GP	GS	Record	Comp	Att	Pct	Yards	Avg	TD	Int	Rate	Att	Yards	Avg	TD
2018	Oklahoma State	0	0	—	Redshirted (redshirt)											
2019	Oklahoma State	11	10	7−3	155	247	62.8	2,065	8.4	16	11	145.4	139	628	4.5	2
2020	Oklahoma State	9	9	6−3	155	247	62.8	2,007	8.1	14	8	143.2	101	269	2.7	2
2021	Oklahoma State	13	13	11−2	243	391	62.1	2,839	7.2	20	12	133.9	146	668	4.6	6
2022	Oklahoma State	10	9	6−3	212	368	57.6	2,642	7.2	17	9	128.3	107	391	3.7	8
2023	Ole Miss	9	0	—	19	29	65.5	278	9.6	3	0	180.2	11	45	4.1	0
Career		52	41	30−11	784	1,282	61.2	9,831	7.7	70	40	137.3	504	2,001	4.0	18

== Professional career ==
Pre-draft measurables
Height	Weight	Arm length	Hand span	Wingspan	40-yard dash	10-yard split	20-yard split	20-yard shuttle	Three-cone drill	Vertical jump	Broad jump
6 ft 0 7/8 in (1.85 m)	209 lb (95 kg)	30 in (0.76 m)	9 1/8 in (0.23 m)	6 ft 3 3/8 in (1.91 m)	4.94 s	1.79 s	2.81 s	4.56 s	7.18 s	24.0 in (0.61 m)	8 ft 7 in (2.62 m)
All values from Pro Day

On February 17, 2025, Sanders signed with the DC Defenders of the United Football League. He spent the season as the Defenders' third-string quarterback behind Jordan Ta'amu and Mike DiLiello and did not record any passing statistics, though he did record a 14-yard reception while appearing in two games.

On January 12, 2026, Sanders was selected by the DC Defenders in the 2026 UFL draft. He returned as the Defenders' third-string quarterback behind Ta'amu and DiLiello before being elevated to the primary backup role after DiLiello was traded during the season. Sanders' only appearance through the first seven games came in Week 6 against the Dallas Renegades, when he played wide receiver and recorded three receptions for 13 yards. In Week 8 against the Louisville Kings, Ta'amu suffered an injury in the first half and Sanders entered in relief. He completed 7 of 15 passes for 83 yards and an interception while adding 27 rushing yards in a 33–30 loss. He was not retained for the 2027 season.

== UFL career statistics ==
Year	Team	Games			Passing								Rushing				Receiving			
Year	Team	GP	GS	Record	Cmp	Att	Pct	Yds	Y/A	TD	Int	Rtg	Att	Yds	Avg	TD	Rec	Yds	Avg	TD
2025	DC	2	0	—	0	0	0.0	0	0.0	0	0	0.0	0	0	0.0	0	1	14	14.0	0
2026	DC	3	1	0–1	17	36	47.2	243	6.8	0	1	58.0	13	102	7.9	0	3	13	4.3	0
Career		5	1	0–1	17	36	47.2	243	6.8	0	1	58.0	13	102	7.9	0	4	27	6.8	0
