= Deon Jackson (American football) =

American football player (born 1999)

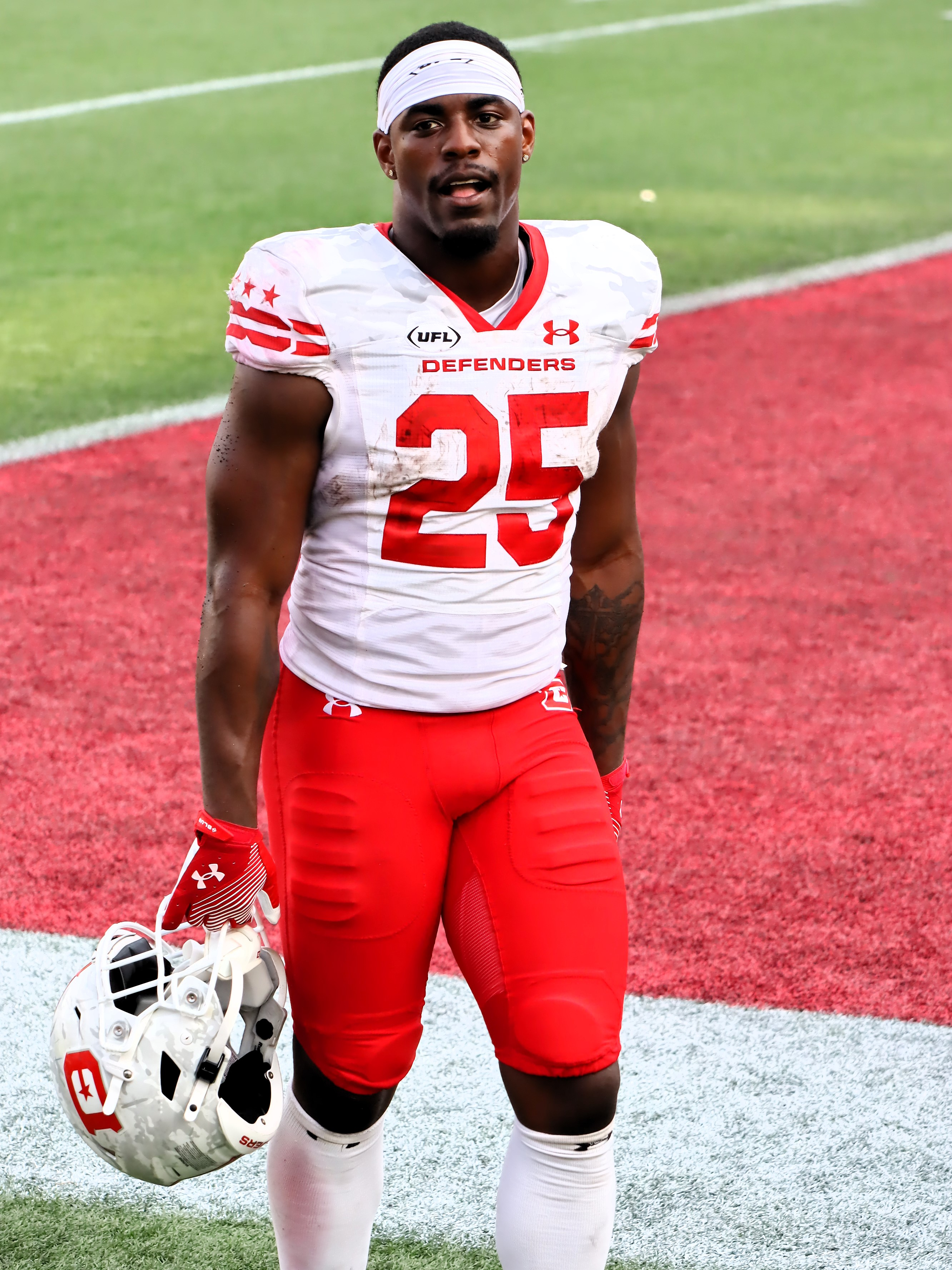
- Jackson with the DC Defenders in 2025

Saskatchewan Roughriders
- Position: Running back
- Roster status: Practice roster

Personal information
- Born: February 18, 1999 (age 27); Atlanta, Georgia, U.S.
- Listed height: 5 ft 11 in (1.80 m)
- Listed weight: 218 lb (99 kg)

Career information
- High school: Pace Academy (Atlanta)
- College: Duke (2017–2020)
- NFL draft: 2021: undrafted

Career history
- Indianapolis Colts (2021–2023); Cleveland Browns (2023); New York Giants (2023); New York Jets (2024)*; DC Defenders (2025); Detroit Lions (2025)*; DC Defenders (2026); Saskatchewan Roughriders (2026–present)*
- * Offseason or practice squad member only

Awards and highlights
- UFL champion (2025); All-UFL Team (2026); UFL rushing yards leader (2026); UFL rushing touchdowns leader (2026)

Career NFL statistics
- Rushing yards: 283
- Rushing average: 3.0
- Rushing touchdowns: 2
- Receptions: 35
- Receiving yards: 223
- Receiving touchdowns: 1
- Stats at Pro Football Reference

Deon Jackson (born February 18, 1999) is an American professional football running back for the Saskatchewan Roughriders of the Canadian Football League (CFL). He played college football for the Duke Blue Devils. He also played for the Indianapolis Colts, Cleveland Browns, and New York Giants.

== Early life ==
Jackson attended Pace Academy in Atlanta, Georgia, where he played football.

== College career ==
Jackson committed to Duke University in 2016. He played for the Blue Devils from 2017–2020, amassing 2,267 rushing yards and 18 rushing touchdowns in his collegiate career.

=== Statistics ===
Year	Team	Rushing						Receiving		
Year	Team	Games	Att	Yards	Avg	Yds/G	TD	Att	Yards	TD
2017	Duke	12	32	97	3.0	8.1	0	4	4	0
2018	Duke	13	161	847	5.3	65.2	7	26	253	2
2019	Duke	12	172	641	3.7	53.4	6	21	192	2
2020	Duke	11	161	682	4.2	62.0	5	10	85	0
Career		48	526	2,267	4.3	47.2	18	61	534	4

== Professional career ==
Pre-draft measurables
Height	Weight	Arm length	Hand span	Wingspan	40-yard dash	10-yard split	20-yard split	20-yard shuttle	Three-cone drill	Vertical jump	Broad jump	Bench press
5 ft 11 in (1.80 m)	218 lb (99 kg)	30 1/4 in (0.77 m)	9 1/4 in (0.23 m)	6 ft 1 1/4 in (1.86 m)	4.42 s	1.51 s	2.57 s	4.40 s	7.14 s	36.0 in (0.91 m)	10 ft 3 in (3.12 m)	18 reps
All values from Pro Day

=== Indianapolis Colts ===
Jackson signed with the Indianapolis Colts as an undrafted free agent on May 6, 2021. He was waived on August 31, 2021, and re-signed to the practice squad the next day. He was promoted to the active roster on November 1. In week 6 of the 2022 season, Jackson drew his first career start against the Jacksonville Jaguars after starting running back Jonathan Taylor and backup running back Nyheim Hines were both ruled out because of injuries. He had 121 scrimmage yards and a rushing touchdown in his first start. He started in two games and appeared in 16 as a rookie. He finished with 68 carries for 236 rushing yards and one rushing touchdown to go along with 30 receptions for 209 receiving yards and one receiving touchdown.

On September 23, 2023, Jackson was released by the Colts.

=== Cleveland Browns ===
On September 26, 2023, Jackson signed with the practice squad of the Cleveland Browns. He was promoted to the active roster on October 21. He was waived on October 23.

=== New York Giants ===
On October 24, 2023, the New York Giants claimed Jackson off waivers after he was released by the Browns the previous day. He was waived on November 20 and re-signed to the practice squad. Following the end of the 2023 regular season, the Giants signed him to a reserve/future contract on January 8, 2024. On May 10, 2024, he was waived.

=== New York Jets ===
On August 7, 2024, Jackson signed with the New York Jets. He was waived on August 27.

=== DC Defenders (first stint) ===
On December 2, 2024, Jackson signed with the DC Defenders of the United Football League (UFL). His contract was terminated on August 9, 2025, to sign with an NFL team.

=== Detroit Lions ===
On August 10, 2025, Jackson signed with the Detroit Lions. He was waived on August 26 as part of final roster cuts.

=== DC Defenders (second stint) ===
On January 10, 2026, Jackson was selected by the DC Defenders in the 2026 UFL draft.

=== Saskatchewan Roughriders ===
On September 20, 2026, Jackson signed with the Saskatchewan Roughriders of the Canadian Football League (CFL).
