= Abram Smith (American football) =

American football player (born 1998)

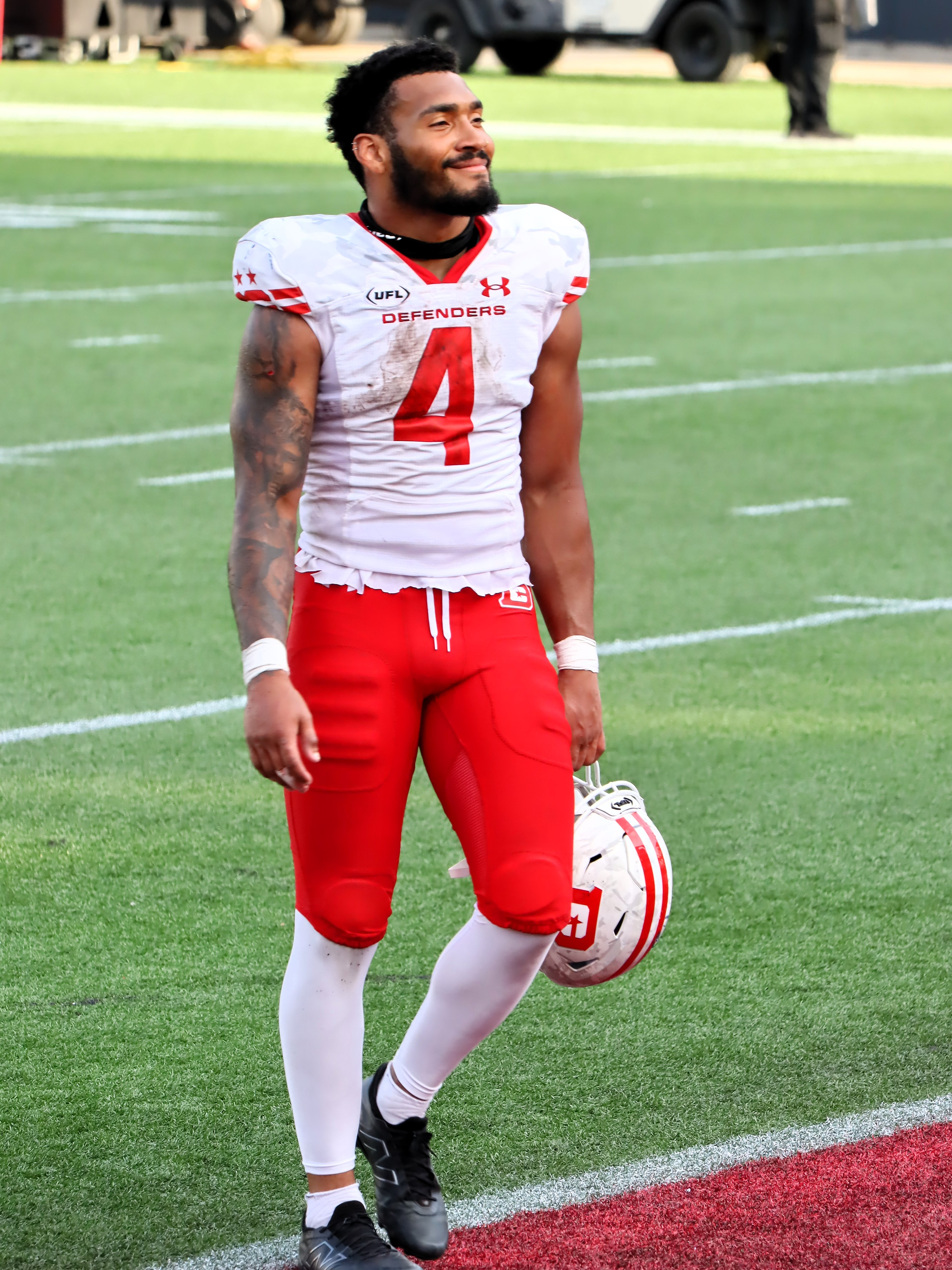
- Smith with the DC Defenders in 2025

No. 4 – DC Defenders
- Position: Running back
- Roster status: Active

Personal information
- Born: September 14, 1998 (age 28); Abilene, Texas, U.S.
- Listed height: 5 ft 11 in (1.80 m)
- Listed weight: 230 lb (104 kg)

Career information
- High school: Abilene
- College: Baylor (2017–2021)
- NFL draft: 2022: undrafted

Career history
- New Orleans Saints (2022)*; DC Defenders (2023); Minnesota Vikings (2023)*; DC Defenders (2024–present)
- * Offseason or practice squad member only

Awards and highlights
- UFL champion (2025); All-XFL Team (2023); XFL rushing yards leader (2023); XFL rushing touchdowns co-leader (2023); Second-team All-Big 12 (2021)
- Stats at Pro Football Reference

Abram Smith (born September 14, 1998) is an American football running back for the DC Defenders of the United Football League (UFL). He played college football at Baylor.

== Early life ==
Smith attended Abilene High School in Abilene, Texas. During his high school career, he rushed for a school record 4,955 yards and 77 touchdowns. He originally committed to play college football at the University of Tulsa before changing his commitment to Baylor University.

== College career ==
After taking a medical redshirt his first year at Baylor in 2017, Smith played in six games in 2018, rushing four times for 11 yards. As a sophomore in 2019, he played in all 14 games, rushing eight times for 35 yards. Smith moved from running back to linebacker in 2020. He finished the season with 48 tackles and one sack. Smith moved back to running back his senior season and became the starter.

Smith was named the starting running back for the 2021 Baylor Bears football team and helped lead the Bears to a school record 12–2 season capped with a 2021 Big 12 Championship Game title and a 2022 Sugar Bowl victory. During the 2022 Sugar Bowl versus the Ole Miss Rebels, Smith rushed for 172 yards on 25 carries. With his Sugar Bowl performance, Smith broke the Baylor single season rushing record with 1,601 yards, which was previously held by Terrance Ganaway (1,547 yards in 2011). Smith was named second-team All-Big 12 and a finalist for the Earl Campbell Tyler Rose Award (2021).

=== College statistics ===
Season	GP	Rushing				Receiving			
Season	GP	Att	Yds	Avg	TD	Rec	Yds	Avg	TD
2018	2	4	11	2.8	0	1	3	3	0
2019	3	8	35	4.4	1	0	0	0	0
2021	14	257	1,601	6.2	12	13	75	5.8	0
Career	19	269	1,647	6.1	13	14	78	5.6	0

== Professional career ==
Pre-draft measurables
Height	Weight	Arm length	Hand span	Wingspan	40-yard dash	10-yard split	20-yard split	20-yard shuttle	Three-cone drill	Vertical jump	Broad jump	Bench press
5 ft 11 5/8 in (1.82 m)	213 lb (97 kg)	30 1/4 in (0.77 m)	8 1/4 in (0.21 m)	6 ft 0 3/8 in (1.84 m)	4.54 s	1.53 s	2.59 s	4.40 s	7.25 s	36.0 in (0.91 m)	9 ft 8 in (2.95 m)	13 reps
All values from NFL Combine/Pro Day

=== New Orleans Saints ===
Smith signed with the New Orleans Saints as an undrafted free agent on May 1, 2022. He was waived on August 28.

=== DC Defenders (first stint) ===
Smith was drafted with the 1st overall pick in the 2023 XFL draft during the first phase (Skill Players) of the draft by the DC Defenders. Smith rushed for 788 yards and seven touchdowns during the season. He was also named to the 2023 All-XFL team at the end of the season. He was released from his contract on August 3, 2023.

=== Minnesota Vikings ===
On August 4, 2023, Smith signed with the Minnesota Vikings. He was waived on August 28, 2023.

=== DC Defenders (second stint) ===
On October 19, 2023, Smith re-signed with the DC Defenders. He was placed on injured reserve on March 14, 2024, due to an ACL injury.
