= E. J. Perry (American football) =

American football player (born 1998)

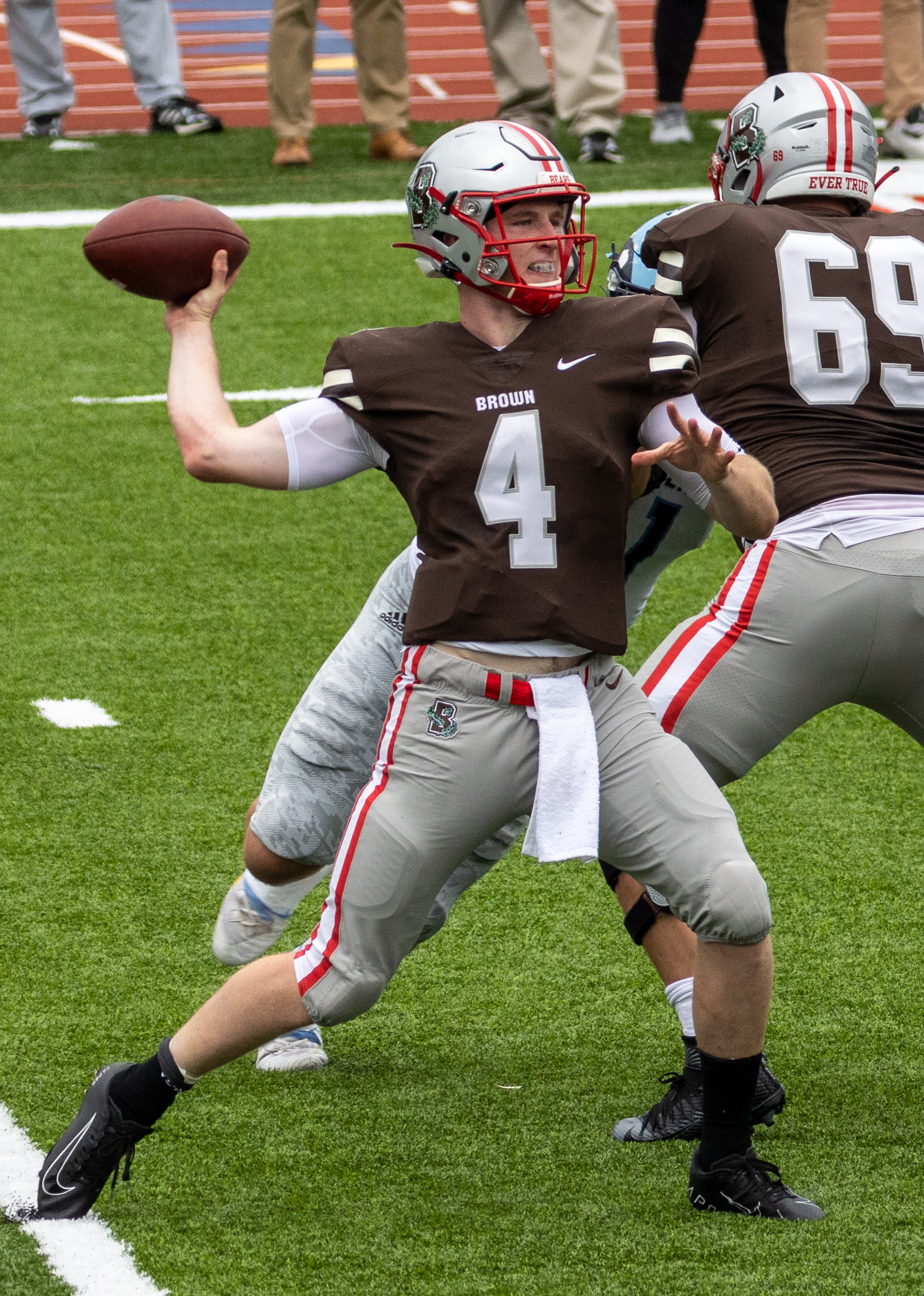
- Perry with the Brown Bears in 2021

Profile
- Position: Quarterback

Personal information
- Born: August 16, 1998 (age 28); Andover, Massachusetts, U.S.
- Listed height: 6 ft 2 in (1.88 m)
- Listed weight: 208 lb (94 kg)

Career information
- High school: Andover
- College: Boston College (2017–2018); Brown (2019–2021)
- NFL draft: 2022: undrafted

Career history
- Jacksonville Jaguars (2022)*; Houston Texans (2023)*; Michigan Panthers (2023); Houston Texans (2023)*; Michigan Panthers (2023)*; Jacksonville Jaguars (2023)*; Michigan Panthers (2024); Jacksonville Jaguars (2024)*; Michigan Panthers (2025)*; Memphis Showboats (2025); Montreal Alouettes (2025)*; DC Defenders (2026)
- * Offseason or practice squad member only

Awards and highlights
- Bushnell Cup (2021); 2× First-team All-Ivy League (2019, 2021)

Career spring football statistics as of 2025
- Passing attempts: 206
- Passing completions: 122
- Completion percentage: 59.2
- TD–INT: 4–8
- Passing yards: 1,383
- Passer rating: 69.3
- Rushing yards: 270
- Rushing touchdowns: 6
- Stats at Pro Football Reference
- Stats at CFL.ca

Ernest Joseph Perry IV (born August 26, 1998) is an American professional football quarterback. He played college football for the Boston College Eagles and Brown Bears.

== Early life ==
Perry grew up in Andover, Massachusetts, and attended Andover High School. He played football at Andover for his father, E. J. Perry III, and was a four-year starter at quarterback. Perry set the single-game state record for passing yards with 636 during his junior season and was featured in Sports Illustrated's Faces in the Crowd. As a senior, Perry was named the Boston Globe Division 1 Player of the Year after he passed for 3,398 yards and 47 touchdowns, which tied the state record, and also rushed for 1,006 rushing yards and 13 touchdowns. He finished his high school career with 8,712 passing yards and 114 touchdown passes, both of which are second in Massachusetts high school history. Perry committed to play college football at Boston College over FBS offers from UMass and Ohio and from FCS schools New Hampshire, Holy Cross, Monmouth, Bryant, Yale, Dartmouth, Brown and Columbia.

== College career ==
Perry began his collegiate career at Boston College and joined the team as an early enrollee. He played in one game as a freshman but did not throw a pass. As a sophomore, Perry played in five games and completed 27 of 39 passes for 277 yards and two touchdowns. Following the end of the season, Perry announced that he would be transferring to Brown where his uncle, James Perry had recently been named head coach.

Perry was named the Brown Bears' starting quarterback going into his first season with the team. He was named first-team All-Ivy League after completing 251 of 418 pass attempts for 2,948 yards and 22 touchdowns with 13 interceptions and also leading the team with 730 rushing yards with eight touchdowns. He also played basketball for Brown following the season. Perry's initial senior season in 2020 was canceled due to Covid-19.

In 2021, Perry won the Bushnell Cup as the Ivy League's top offensive player and was again named first-team all-conference after completing 295 of 444 attempts for 3,033 yards and 23 touchdowns against 14 interceptions and rushing for 402 yards and seven touchdowns. He also won The George H. "Bulger" Lowe Award by the Gridiron Club of Greater Boston as the best offensive player in New England and was a finalist for the Walter Payton Award. After the conclusion of his college career, Perry was invited to play in the 2022 East–West Shrine Bowl. He completed 13-of-18 passing attempts for 241 yards and three touchdowns and also rushed for two two-point conversions and was named the game's offensive MVP. Perry graduated from Brown with a degree in sociology in December 2021.

== Professional career ==
=== Pre-draft ===
Perry participated in the 2022 NFL Combine and received the highest overall athleticism score of any quarterback invited. Leading up to the draft he worked out with New England Patriots quarterbacks Mac Jones and Jarrett Stidham at Edge Performance Systems in Foxborough, Massachusetts.

Pre-draft measurables
Height	Weight	Arm length	Hand span	Wingspan	40-yard dash	10-yard split	20-yard split	20-yard shuttle	Three-cone drill	Vertical jump	Broad jump
6 ft 1 5/8 in (1.87 m)	211 lb (96 kg)	32 in (0.81 m)	9 in (0.23 m)	6 ft 3 1/2 in (1.92 m)	4.65 s	1.55 s	2.66 s	4.18 s	6.85 s	34.5 in (0.88 m)	10 ft 3 in (3.12 m)
All values from NFL Combine

=== Jacksonville Jaguars (first stint) ===
Perry initially agreed to terms for a contract with the Philadelphia Eagles as an undrafted free agent shortly after the conclusion of the 2022 NFL draft. However, he opted not to sign with the team after the Eagles signed quarterback Carson Strong and instead signed a contract with the Jacksonville Jaguars on May 3, 2022. On July 24, 2022, the Jaguars released Perry with a non-football injury designation. He was re-signed by the Jaguars on August 9, 2022. Perry was waived a second time on August 30, 2022, during final roster cuts and re-signed to the practice squad. He signed a reserve/future contract with the Jaguars on January 23, 2023. He was waived on March 7, 2023.

=== Houston Texans (first stint) ===
On March 8, 2023, Perry was claimed off waivers by the Houston Texans. He was waived on May 11, 2023.

=== Michigan Panthers (first stint) ===
Perry signed with the Michigan Panthers of the United States Football League on May 30, 2023. He was released from his contract on August 12, 2023, to sign with an NFL team.

=== Houston Texans (second stint) ===
Perry re-signed with the Texans on August 13, 2023. He was waived on August 29, 2023.

=== Michigan Panthers (second stint) ===
On December 18, 2023, Perry re-signed with the Panthers, but was released the next day to sign with an NFL team.

=== Jacksonville Jaguars (second stint) ===
On December 19, 2023, Perry signed to the Jaguars' practice squad following starting quarterback Trevor Lawrence entering concussion protocol. He was not signed to a reserve/future contract and thus became a free agent after the season when his practice squad contract expired.

=== Michigan Panthers (third stint) ===
Perry re-signed with the Michigan Panthers on January 22, 2024. He was placed on injured reserve on April 24, 2024. He was activated on June 4. He re-signed with the Panthers again on August 9, 2024. His contract was terminated on August 20, 2024, to sign with an NFL team.

=== Jacksonville Jaguars (third stint) ===
On August 20, 2024, Perry re-signed with the Jacksonville Jaguars. He was waived on August 27, and re-signed to the practice squad, but released the next day.

=== Michigan Panthers (fourth stint) ===
On November 12, 2024, Perry re-signed with the Michigan Panthers. He was released on February 4, 2025.

=== Memphis Showboats ===
On February 5, 2025, Perry signed with the Memphis Showboats of the United Football League (UFL).

=== Montreal Alouettes ===
On October 7, 2025, Perry was signed to the practice roster of the Montreal Alouettes of the Canadian Football League. He was an early training camp cut on May 12, 2026.

=== DC Defenders ===
On May 25, 2026, Perry signed with the DC Defenders of the United Football League (UFL). He was not retained for the 2027 season.

== Career statistics ==
=== Professional ===
==== Regular season ====
Year	Team	League	Games			Passing									Rushing				
Year	Team	League	GP	GS	Record	Cmp	Att	Pct	Yds	Y/A	Lng	TD	Int	Rtg	Att	Yds	Avg	Lng	TD
2023	MICH	USFL	1	1	1–0	12	23	52.2	121	5.3	31	0	0	67.5	10	48	4.8	25	1
2024	MICH	UFL	4	4	2–2	55	79	69.6	664	8.4	76	2	3	78.1	23	151	6.6	17	4
2025	MEM	UFL	6	4	0–4	55	94	58.5	598	6.4	49	2	5	62.3	18	71	4.0	16	1
2026	DC	UFL	0	0	—	DNP													
Career			11	9	3–6	122	206	59.2	1,383	6.7	76	4	8	69.3	51	270	5.3	25	6

==== Postseason ====
Year	Team	League	Games			Passing									Rushing				
Year	Team	League	GP	GS	Record	Cmp	Att	Pct	Yds	Y/A	Lng	TD	Int	Rtg	Att	Yds	Avg	Lng	TD
2023	MICH	USFL	1	1	0–1	23	38	60.5	370	9.7	72	2	1	99.7	7	22	3.1	6	1
2026	DC	UFL	1	0	0–1	5	12	41.7	50	4.2	31	0	1	19.4	7	43	6.1	15	0
Career			2	1	0–1	28	50	56.0	420	6.9	72	2	2	59.6	14	65	4.6	15	1

=== College ===
Season	Team	Games			Passing							Rushing			
Season	Team	GP	GS	Record	Cmp	Att	Pct	Yds	TD	Int	Rtg	Att	Yds	Avg	TD
2017	Boston College	1	0	—	Redshirted (redshirt)										
2018	Boston College	5	0	—	27	39	69.2	277	2	0	145.8	20	70	3.5	1
2019	Brown	10	10	2–8	249	416	59.9	2,938	22	13	130.4	141	727	5.2	8
2020	Brown	0	0	—	Season canceled due to Covid-19										
2021	Brown	10	10	2–8	296	445	66.5	3,034	23	14	134.6	111	402	3.6	7
Career		26	20	4–16	572	900	63.5	6,247	47	27	133.1	272	1,199	4.4	16

== Personal life ==
Another uncle of Perry's, John Perry, is a football coach and was previously the head coach at Merrimack College. John also was a receiver coach for the Houston Texans. Has a younger brother, Will, who plays football for the UMass Minutemen.
