= United Bowl (UFL) =

American football championship game

The United Bowl is the annual league championship game for the United Football League (UFL). In 2024 and 2025, the game—then known as the UFL Championship Game— was held at The Dome at America's Center in St. Louis, Missouri. In 2026, the game was given its current title and was held at Audi Field in Washington, DC.

Credit One Bank is the game's presenting sponsor as of 2026. The 2025 game was presented by Underdog Fantasy Sports.

== List of games ==
Every winning team in bold.

Season	Winning team	Score	Losing team	Location	Stadium
2024	**Birmingham Stallions** (1)	**25**–0	San Antonio Brahmas	St. Louis, Missouri	The Dome at America's Center
2025	**DC Defenders** (1)	**58**–34	Michigan Panthers	St. Louis, Missouri	The Dome at America's Center
2026	**Louisville Kings** (1)	**27**–20	DC Defenders	Washington, DC	Audi Field

== Appearances by year ==
In the sortable table below, teams are ordered first by number of appearances, then by number of wins, and finally by year of first appearance. In the "Game(s)" column, bold years indicate winning championship games. Teams marked in gray are now defunct.

Apps	Team	Wins	Losses	Win %	Game(s)
2	DC Defenders	1	1	.500	**2025**, 2026
1	Birmingham Stallions	1	0	1.000	**2024**
1	Louisville Kings	1	0	1.000	**2026**
1	San Antonio Brahmas	0	1	.000	2024
1	Michigan Panthers	0	1	.000	2025

== See also ==
- USFL Championship Game
- XFL Championship Game
