= 2026 Louisville Kings season =

Inaugural season of the United Football League (2024) franchise in Louisville, Kentucky

- Owner: Alpha Acquico, LLC
- Head coach: Chris Redman
- Home stadium: Lynn Family Stadium

Results
- Record: 6–4
- Conference place: 3rd in UFL
- Playoffs: Won Semifinals (at Battlehawks) 29–20; Won United Bowl (vs. Defenders) 27–20

Uniform
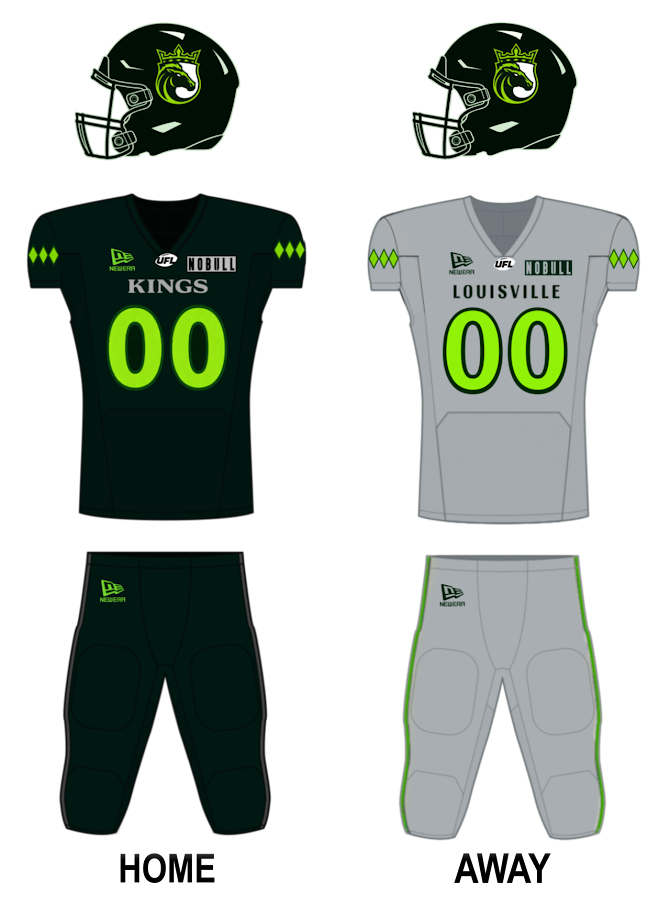

The 2026 season was the Louisville Kings’ first in the United Football League (UFL). They were led by first-year head coach Chris Redman and played their home games at Lynn Family Stadium. The Kings finished the regular season with a 6–4 record, securing the No. 3 seed in the playoffs. They went on to win the 2026 United Bowl, defeating the DC Defenders 27–20. The Kings became the first team in league history to win a title in its inaugural season.

The Kings began the season 0–3 before defeating the Houston Gamblers 24–22 in overtime to earn their first win. Following the victory, Louisville traded starting quarterback Jason Bean, released starting running back Benny Snell, and made significant changes along the offensive line. Quarterback Chandler Rogers then led the Kings to a 6–4 finish, with the team's only loss during that stretch coming against the St. Louis Battlehawks. The 5–1 stretch included two victories over the defending UFL champions DC Defenders. Under Rogers, Louisville scored at least 30 points in all of its wins, including two games with 42 or more points. The 2026 season saw Louisville continue its rise, clinching a playoff spot on May 30 after the Birmingham Stallions lost to the Gamblers in Week 10, becoming the first team in UFL history to reach the playoffs after an 0–3 start. After defeating the Columbus Aviators in the regular season finale, the Kings also became the first team in league history to finish with a winning record following that start. Louisville then defeated St. Louis 29–20 in the playoffs before going on to win the 2026 United Bowl 27–20 over DC.

Individually, Cam Gill was named UFL Defensive Player of the Year and set a league record with 10 sacks. Kicker Tanner Brown was named UFL Special Teams Player of the Year and set a league record with 25 field goals, converting 89.3% of his attempts.

== Offseason ==
=== Coaching changes ===
On December 30, 2025, Chris Redman was named the team's inaugural head coach. On February 23, 2026, the Kings announced their full 2026 coaching staff.

On March 31, 2026, following the team's inaugural game, offensive line coach Breno Giacomini was fired. On April 3, 2026, his replacement, Charlie Eger, was announced.

=== Draft ===
Teams were allowed to protect up to 12 players from their 2025 rosters. Following this process, the Louisville Kings were allocated players from the roster of the defunct Memphis Showboats.

== Staff ==
Louisville Kings staff
Head coach: Head coach – Chris Redman; Offensive coaches: Offensive coordinator – Steve Logan; Wide receivers – Tony Banks; Tight ends – Jeff Jagodzinski; Offensive line – Charlie Eger	Defensive coaches: Defensive coordinator – Jamie Sharper; Linebackers – Brad Jackson; Defensive backs – Chris McAlister

== Final roster ==
2026 Louisville Kings final roster
Quarterbacks: 5 Mike DiLiello; 13 N'Kosi Perry; 4 Chandler Rogers; Running backs: 30 James Robinson; 20 Jaden Shirden; 33 Ian Wheeler; Wide receivers: 14 Carter Bell; 17 Tarik Black; 82 Tyler Hudson; 0 Lucky Jackson; 10 Kaden Prather; 11 Isaiah Winstead; Tight ends: 84 Zach Davidson; 87 Tre' McKitty; 89 Chris Pierce Jr.; 85 Jalen Wydermyer	Offensive linemen: 72 Juwann Bushell-Beatty T; 68 John Campbell Jr. G/T; 74 Kellen Diesch T/G; 65 J. D. DiRenzo G; 76 Mike McAllister C; 75 Jaylon Thomas G; 71 James Tunstall T; 63 Dohnovan West G/C; Defensive linemen: 22 Jaylon Allen DE; 98 Travis Bell DT; 91 Josiah Bronson DT; 99 Xavier Carlton DE; 46 Cam Gill DE; 44 Daniel Grzesiak DE; 96 DeVere Levelston DT; 47 Lonnie Phelps DE; 97 LaRon Stokes DT	Linebackers: 42 Steele Chambers; 54 Antonio Grier; 36 Nick Kubitz; 18 Jaheim Thomas; Defensive backs: 24 DeAgo Brumfield CB; 3 Cameron Dantzler CB; 2 Keaton Ellis S; 8 Mekhi Garner S; 7 Eric Garror CB; 34 Bryce Hall CB; 15 Quindell Johnson S; 12 Corey Mayfield Jr. CB; 25 Rayshad Williams S; Special teams: 19 Mac Brown P; 49 Tanner Brown K; 48 Jordan Silver LS	Reserve lists: 9 Jonathan Adams WR (IR); 21 Jalen Jackson RB (IR); -- Lorenzo Mauldin DE Retired; 78 Chim Okorafor T (IR); 6 Kenny Robinson S (IR); 23 Teldrick Ross CB (IR); 49 active, 6 inactive

== Schedule ==
All times Eastern

Week	Day	Date	Kickoff	TV	Opponent	Results		Location	Attendance
Week	Day	Date	Kickoff	TV	Opponent	Score	Record	Location	Attendance
1	Friday	March 27	8:00 p.m.	Fox	Birmingham Stallions	L 13–15	0–1	Lynn Family Stadium	14,034
2	Saturday	April 4	8:00 p.m.	ESPN	at Orlando Storm	L 9–19	0–2	Inter&Co Stadium	8,585
3	Friday	April 10	8:00 p.m.	Fox	Orlando Storm	L 27–29 (OT)	0–3	Lynn Family Stadium	11,082
4	Thursday	April 16	8:00 p.m.	NFL Network	at Houston Gamblers	W 24–22 (OT)	1–3	Shell Energy Stadium	4,880
5	Sunday	April 26	3:00 p.m.	ABC	at Dallas Renegades	W 47–25	2–3	Toyota Stadium	7,123
6	Thursday	April 30	8:00 p.m.	FS1	St. Louis Battlehawks	L 3–16	2–4	Lynn Family Stadium	10,456
7	Saturday	May 9	1:30 p.m.	Fox	at DC Defenders	W 30–13	3–4	Audi Field	7,950
8	Saturday	May 16	12:00 p.m.	ABC	DC Defenders	W 33–30	4–4	Lynn Family Stadium	10,025
9	Sunday	May 24	4:00 p.m.	Fox	Dallas Renegades	W 37–23	5–4	Lynn Family Stadium	10,378
10	Sunday	May 31	6:00 p.m.	Fox	at Columbus Aviators	W 42–27	6–4	Historic Crew Stadium	10,705

=== Game summaries ===
==== Week 1: vs. Birmingham Stallions ====
Week 1: Birmingham Stallions at Louisville Kings – Game summary

Quarter	1	2	3	4	Total
Stallions	6	3	0	6	15
Kings	7	0	3	3	13

at Lynn Family Stadium • Louisville, Kentucky

- Date: March 27
- Game time: 8:00 p.m. EDT
- Game weather: Partly cloudy, 46 °F (8 °C)
- Game attendance: 14,034
- Referee: James Carter
- TV announcers (Fox): Curt Menefee, Joel Klatt and Jake Butt
- Game Book

Game information

First quarter

- BIR – Snoop Conner 5-yard run (kick failed), 9:00. Stallions 6–0. Drive: 6 plays • 43 yards • 3:30
- LOU – Lucky Jackson 12-yard pass from Jason Bean (Tanner Brown kick), 2:48. Kings 7–6. Drive: 10 plays • 72 yards • 6:13

Second quarter

- BIR – Jonathan Garibay 31-yard field goal, 3:50. Stallions 9–7. Drive: 13 plays • 66 yards • 7:39

Third quarter

- LOU – Tanner Brown 37-yard field goal, 4:56. Kings 10–9. Drive: 6 plays • 51 yards • 2:35

Fourth quarter

- LOU – Tanner Brown 20-yard field goal, 8:42. Kings 13–9. Drive: 8 plays • 63 yards • 4:38
- BIR – Justyn Ross 14-yard pass from Matt Corral (kick failed), 2:00. Stallions 15–13. Drive: 13 plays • 66 yards • 6:42

Top passers

- BIR – Matt Corral – 21/30, 208 yards, TD
- LOU – Jason Bean – 14/27, 226 yards, TD, 2 INT

Top rushers

- BIR – Snoop Conner – 16 rushes, 56 yards, TD
- LOU – Jason Bean – 5 rushes, 27 yards

Top receivers

- BIR – Jaydon Mickens – 9 receptions, 103 yards
- LOU – Lucky Jackson – 6 receptions, 73 yards, TD

The Louisville Kings’ inaugural drive began with a dropped pass that was deflected and intercepted by the Stallions’ Dyontae Johnson. The Stallions capitalized on the turnover, scoring on their ensuing possession with a five-yard run by Snoop Conner, though the extra point attempt was unsuccessful. Louisville responded on its next drive with a 12-yard touchdown pass from Jason Bean to Lucky Jackson. The Stallions then had a field goal attempt blocked on their next possession, but later converted a 31-yard field goal by kicker Jonathan Garibay following a Kings punt. With under a minute remaining in the first half, Kings running back Ian Wheeler fumbled at the goal line, and the Stallions maintained a 9–7 lead at halftime. Singer Russell Dickerson performed during the halftime show.

To start the second half, following a Stallions failed fourth-down conversion, Kings kicker Tanner Brown made a 37-yard field goal. Louisville then stopped Birmingham on a fourth-down attempt at the 38-yard line. Brown added a 21-yard field goal to extend the Kings’ lead to 13–9 with 8:42 remaining. On the Stallions’ next drive, Matt Corral threw a 15-yard touchdown pass to Justyn Ross, but Garibay missed the extra point, giving the Stallions a 15–13 lead with under two minutes remaining. Jaden Shirden returned the ensuing kickoff to midfield, but Bean was ultimately intercepted by Hudson Clark. The Stallions were forced to punt with under a minute remaining, but their defense held Louisville, securing the victory.

==== Week 2: at Orlando Storm ====
Week 2: Louisville Kings at Orlando Storm – Game summary

Quarter	1	2	3	4	Total
Kings	3	6	0	0	9
Storm	3	9	0	7	19

at Inter&Co Stadium • Orlando, Florida

- Date: April 4
- Game time: 8:00 p.m. EDT
- Game weather: Clear, 79 °F (26 °C)
- Game attendance: 8,585
- Referee: Chris Coyte
- TV announcers (ESPN): Joe Tessitore, Jordan Rodgers, Sam Acho and Tom Luginbill
- Game Book

Game information

First quarter

- LOU – Tanner Brown 42-yard field goal, 7:43. Kings 3–0. Drive: 5 plays • 28 yards • 2:05
- ORL – Michael Lantz 57-yard field goal, 5:10. Tied 3–3. Drive: 6 plays • 15 yards • 2:33.

Second quarter

- LOU – Tanner Brown 41-yard field goal, 15:00. Kings 6–3. Drive: 10 plays • 65 yards • 5:10
- ORL – Michael Lantz 41-yard field goal, 8:54. Tied 6–6. Drive: 11 plays • 53 yards • 6:06.
- LOU – Tanner Brown 26-yard field goal, 2:00. Kings 9–6. Drive: 11 plays • 63 yards • 6:53
- ORL – K. J. Hamler 41-yard pass from Jack Plummer (kick failed), 0:38. Storm 12–9. Drive: 6 plays • 60 yards • 1:32

Third quarter

- No scoring plays

Fourth quarter

- ORL – Elijhah Badger 39-yard pass from Jack Plummer (Michael Lantz kick), 5:12. Storm 19–9. Drive: 8 plays • 75 yards • 3:54

Top passers

- LOU – Chandler Rogers – 13/20, 151 yards, INT
- ORL – Jack Plummer – 18/23, 182 yards, 2 TD, INT

Top rushers

- LOU – Chandler Rogers – 1 rush, 12 yards
- ORL – Jashaun Corbin – 19 rushes, 51 yards

Top receivers

- LOU – Tre' McKitty – 2 receptions, 39 yards
- ORL – K. J. Hamler – 2 receptions, 59 yards, TD
- ORL – Elijhah Badger – 4 receptions, 59 yards, TD

After both teams exchanged field goals in the first quarter, Kings quarterback Jason Bean was replaced by backup quarterback Chandler Rogers, who led the team to two additional field goals by Tanner Brown, giving the Kings a 9–6 lead. Late in the first half, Storm starting quarterback Jack Plummer left the game due to injury. His replacement, Dorian Thompson-Robinson, made his UFL debut and completed two of three passes for 19 yards before Plummer returned on a third-and-19 play, connecting with wide receiver K. J. Hamler for a 41-yard touchdown reception with under a minute remaining. The extra point was missed, and Orlando led 12–9 at halftime.

After a scoreless third quarter, Plummer found wide receiver Elijhah Badger for a 39-yard touchdown pass. Following a near interception return touchdown by Mishael Powell off Rogers, Kings cornerback Deantre Prince intercepted Plummer in the end zone, giving the Kings one final opportunity. Bean re-entered the game at quarterback, but the offense was unable to score and was shut out in the second half. The Kings ultimately lost 19–9, finishing with just 27 rushing yards on 13 carries and 216 yards of total offense.

==== Week 3: vs. Orlando Storm ====
Week 3: Orlando Storm at Louisville Kings – Game summary

Quarter	1	2	3	4	OT	Total
Storm	0	10	7	10	2	29
Kings	3	3	14	7	0	27

at Lynn Family Stadium • Louisville, Kentucky

- Date: April 10
- Game time: 8:00 p.m. EDT
- Game weather: Light rain, 67 °F (19 °C)
- Game attendance: 11,082
- Referee: Adam Savoie
- TV announcers (Fox): Curt Menefee, Devin Gardner and Jake Butt
- Game Book

Game information

First quarter

- LOU – Tanner Brown 51-yard field goal, 2:38. Kings 3–0. Drive: 9 plays • 42 yards • 4:31

Second quarter

- ORL – Chris Rowland 8-yard pass from Jack Plummer (Michael Lantz kick), 14:22. Storm 7–3. Drive: 7 plays • 60 yards • 3:16
- LOU – Tanner Brown 27-yard field goal, 5:17. Storm 7–6. Drive: 7 plays • 76 yards • 3:42
- ORL – Michael Lantz 44-yard field goal, 1:39. Storm 9–6. Drive: 6 plays • 21 yards • 3:38

Third quarter

- LOU – Zach Davidson 23-yard pass from Jason Bean (Tanner Brown kick), 13:25. Kings 13–10. Drive: 3 plays • 61 yards • 1:30
- ORL – Jashaun Corbin 20-yard pass from Jack Plummer (Michael Lantz kick), 8:47. Storm 17–13. Drive: 8 plays • 66 yards • 4:43
- LOU – Lucky Jackson 13-yard pass from Jason Bean (Tanner Brown kick), 5:08. Kings 20–17. Drive: 7 plays • 56 yards • 3:39

Fourth quarter

- ORL – Michael Lantz 40-yard field goal, 14:56. Tied 20–20. Drive: 9 plays • 28 yards • 5:12
- ORL – K. J. Hamler 40-yard pass from Jack Plummer (Michael Lantz kick), 11:53. Storm 27–20. Drive: 3 plays • 47 yards • 1:25
- LOU – Zach Davidson 6-yard pass from Jason Bean (Tanner Brown kick), 1:06. Tied 27–27. Drive: 12 plays • 66 yards • 4:12

Overtime

- ORL – Sudden-death conversion good; 2nd consecutive LOU penalty. Storm 29–27.

Top passers

- ORL – Jack Plummer – 21/34, 250 yards, 3 TD
- LOU – Jason Bean – 23/46, 352 yards, 3 TD

Top rushers

- ORL – Tre Stewart – 8 rushes, 35 yards
- LOU – Benny Snell – 12 rushes, 50 yards

Top receivers

- ORL – Chris Rowland – 9 receptions, 113 yards, TD
- LOU – Isaiah Winstead – 7 receptions, 114 yards

In a rematch from the previous week, the Storm took a 10–6 lead into halftime, highlighted by an 8-yard touchdown pass from Jack Plummer to Chris Rowland. Kings quarterback Jason Bean made his third consecutive start after being benched the prior week and played most of the first half, briefly exiting for a few plays due to injury.

To open the second half, Bean connected with Zach Davidson on a 23-yard touchdown pass, marking the Kings’ first touchdown since the first quarter of their season opener and ending a scoring drought of over 100 minutes of game time. Orlando responded with a 20-yard touchdown pass from Plummer to Jashaun Corbin. Plummer later added another second-half touchdown pass to K. J. Hamler. Bean answered with three second-half touchdown passes of his own, including one to Lucky Jackson and a second to Davidson in the final two minutes to tie the game at 27–27.

After neither team scored in the best-of-three shootout, the Kings were stopped on their fourth sudden-death attempt. Orlando then secured the victory after Louisville committed two consecutive defensive penalties, resulting in an awarded two-point conversion. The overtime format drew significant scrutiny from fans and media following the game. League owner Mike Repole commented on X, stating, “Fans don't like the rule. I don't like the rule either. I hear you guys... We owe our fans better.”

==== Week 4: at Houston Gamblers ====
Week 4: Louisville Kings at Houston Gamblers – Game summary

Quarter	1	2	3	4	OT	Total
Kings	3	13	0	6	2	24
Gamblers	3	3	16	0	0	22

at Shell Energy Stadium • Houston, Texas

- Date: April 16
- Game time: 8:00 p.m. EDT
- Game weather: Partly cloudy, 79 °F (26 °C)
- Game attendance: 4,880
- Referee: Chris Coyte
- TV announcers (NFL Network): Lowell Galindo, Kirk Morrison, Aaron Murray and Eric Mac Lain
- Game Book

Game information

First quarter

- LOU – Tanner Brown 59-yard field goal, 11:19. Kings 3–0. Drive: 7 plays • 21 yards • 3:41
- HOU – John Hoyland 50-yard field goal, 6:35. Tied 3–3. Drive: 9 plays • 44 yards • 4:44

Second quarter

- LOU – James Robinson 1-yard run (Tanner Brown kick), 14:55. Kings 10–3. Drive: 10 plays • 51 yards • 6:40
- LOU – Tanner Brown 21-yard field goal, 5:08. Kings 13–3. Drive: 13 plays • 66 yards • 7:29
- HOU – John Hoyland 59-yard field goal, 1:07. Kings 13–6. Drive: 5 plays • 14 yards • 0:36
- LOU – Tanner Brown 58-yard field goal, 0:02. Kings 16–6. Drive: 6 plays • 11 yards • 1:05

Third quarter

- HOU – Marcus Yarns 68-yard run (kick failed), 14:41. Kings 16–12. Drive: 1 play • 68 yards • 0:19
- HOU – Taulia Tagovailoa 6-yard run (John Hoyland kick), 9:50. Gamblers 19–16. Drive: 8 plays • 58 yards • 3:15
- HOU – John Hoyland 50-yard field goal, 2:05. Gamblers 22–16. Drive: 11 plays • 52 yards • 5:54.

Fourth quarter

- LOU – Tanner Brown 52-yard field goal, 14:54. Gamblers 22–19. Drive: 5 plays • 26 yards • 2:11
- LOU – Tanner Brown 48-yard field goal, 10:05. Tied 22–22. Drive: 5 plays • 14 yards • 2:43

Overtime

- LOU – Tre' McKitty–Jason Bean two-point pass. Kings 24–22.

Top passers

- LOU – Jason Bean – 17/34, 192 yards, INT
- HOU – Taulia Tagovailoa – 18/23, 182 yards, 2 TD

Top rushers

- LOU – Jason Bean – 6 rush, 20 yards
- HOU – Marcus Yarns – 8 rushes, 111 yards, TD

Top receivers

- LOU – JaVonta Payton – 3 receptions, 46 yards
- HOU – Justin Hall – 4 receptions, 44 yards

Prior to Week 4, the UFL revised the rule to prevent games from being decided on defensive penalties in overtime; instead, such penalties would only move the ball closer to the goal line. The Kings also re-signed former NFL running back James Robinson, who had previously been released during training camp.

The first quarter featured 50-plus-yard field goals from both teams, as Tanner Brown and John Hoyland each connected from long distance. On a fourth-and-goal from the one-yard line, Robinson scored on a one-yard run—marking the Kings’ first rushing touchdown of the season—and the touchdown was upheld after replay review. The remaining scoring in the half came via field goals, including a 59-yard kick from Hoyland and two from Brown, one of which was a 58-yarder just before halftime, giving the Kings a 16–6 lead.

Gamblers quarterback Nolan Henderson was replaced to start the second half by Taulia Tagovailoa. On the first play of the half, Houston running back Marcus Yarns scored on a 68-yard run, though Hoyland missed the extra point. Houston took the lead on its next possession when Tagovailoa scored on a six-yard run. Hoyland added his third field goal of 50 yards or more to cap the third quarter. In the fourth quarter, Brown made two additional field goals, finishing 5-of-6 on the game, with three from 50 yards or longer. Hoyland went 3-of-4 but missed a 38-yard attempt in the final minute of regulation.

In overtime, the Kings converted on their second attempt when quarterback Jason Bean completed a two-point conversion pass to Tre' McKitty, giving Louisville the lead. The Kings' defense then stopped Houston on all three of its conversion attempts to secure the victory.

==== Week 5: at Dallas Renegades ====
Week 5: Louisville Kings at Dallas Renegades – Game summary

Quarter	1	2	3	4	Total
Kings	3	16	7	21	47
Renegades	0	7	6	12	25

at Toyota Stadium • Frisco, Texas

- Date: April 26
- Game time: 3:00 p.m. EDT
- Game weather: Overcast, 81 °F (27 °C)
- Game attendance: 7,123
- Referee: James Carter
- TV announcers (ABC): Joe Tessitore, Jordan Rodgers, Brock Osweiler and Sam Acho
- Game Book

Game information

First quarter

- LOU – Tanner Brown 38-yard field goal, 7:42. Kings 3–0. Drive: 7 plays • 27 yards • 3:47

Second quarter

- LOU – Bryce Hall 83-yard interception return (Tanner Brown kick), 12:23. Kings 10–0.
- LOU – Ian Wheeler 1-yard run (kick failed), 8:23. Kings 16–0. Drive: 8 plays • 40 yards • 3:46
- DAL – Ellis Merriweather 1-yard run (Colton Theaker kick), 1:11. Kings 16–7. Drive: 14 plays • 68 yards • 7:12
- LOU – Tanner Brown 19-yard field goal, 0:04. Kings 19–7. Drive: 7 plays • 59 yards • 1:07

Third quarter

- DAL – Curtis Hodges 25-yard pass from Austin Reed (two-point pass failed), 7:02. Kings 19–13. Drive: 8 plays, 53 yards, 4:27
- LOU – Ian Wheeler 7-yard run (Tanner Brown kick), 2:37. Kings 26–13. Drive: 9 plays • 76 yards • 4:25

Fourth quarter

- LOU – Ian Wheeler 12-yard run (Tanner Brown kick), 12:47. Kings 33–13. Drive: 6 plays • 27 yards • 2:44
- LOU – Antonio Grier 47-yard interception return (Tanner Brown kick), 11:34. Kings 40–13.
- DAL – Ellis Merriweather 1-yard run (three-point pass failed), 7:27. Kings 40–19. Drive: 7 plays • 73 yards • 4:07
- LOU – Ian Wheeler 2-yard run (Tanner Brown kick), 4:43. Kings 47–19. Drive: 5 plays • 28 yards • 2:42
- DAL – Emmanuel Butler 27-yard pass from Greg Ward, 0:00. Kings 47–25. Drive: 11 plays • 80 yards • 4:43

Top passers

- LOU – Chandler Rogers – 13/18, 150 yards
- DAL – Austin Reed – 14/28, 195 yards, TD, 4 INT

Top rushers

- LOU – James Robinson – 13 rushes, 63 yards
- DAL – Ellis Merriweather – 18 rushes, 55 yards, 2 TD

Top receivers

- LOU – Tarik Black – 5 receptions, 59 yards
- DAL – Drake Stoops – 4 receptions, 47 yards

Prior to the matchup, the Louisville Kings made a series of significant roster moves. The team traded starting quarterback Jason Bean to the DC Defenders in exchange for quarterback Mike DiLiello. They also released running back Benny Snell, who had started all four games and recorded 31 carries for 72 yards. Following Bean's departure, head coach Chris Redman named Chandler Rogers as the new starting quarterback. In addition, the Kings signed center Dohnovan West and offensive tackle Kellen Diesch, while releasing guard Nash Jensen and offensive tackle Leroy Watson.

Louisville secured its second consecutive victory of the season as quarterback Chandler Rogers made his first professional start. Dallas quarterback Austin Reed, who entered the game leading the league in passing yards and touchdowns, was intercepted four times—twice by Corey Mayfield Jr. and once each by Bryce Hall and Antonio Grier, with Hall and Grier each returning their interceptions for touchdowns. The Kings never trailed and rushed for 147 yards on 29 carries, led by running backs James Robinson and Ian Wheeler, with Wheeler scoring four rushing touchdowns. Kicker Tanner Brown converted both field goal attempts and leads the league with 14 made field goals through five games. Rogers was efficient in his debut, completing 13 of 18 passes for 150 yards without committing a turnover. For Dallas, running back Ellis Merriweather scored two rushing touchdowns. On the final play of the game, wide receiver Greg Ward—a former standout quarterback at Houston—threw a consolation touchdown in his lone series at quarterback as Louisville won 47–25.

==== Week 6: vs. St. Louis Battlehawks ====
Week 6: St. Louis Battlehawks at Louisville Kings – Game summary

Quarter	1	2	3	4	Total
Battlehawks	0	9	7	0	16
Kings	3	0	0	0	3

at Lynn Family Stadium • Louisville, Kentucky

- Date: April 30
- Game time: 8:00 p.m. EDT
- Game weather: Sunny, 60 °F (16 °C)
- Game attendance: 10,456
- Referee: Kole Knueppel
- TV announcers (FS1): Kevin Kugler, Devin Gardner and Jake Butt
- Game Book

Game information

First quarter

- LOU – Tanner Brown 40-yard field goal, 9:48. Kings 3–0. Drive: 10 plays • 43 yards • 5:12

Second quarter

- STL – Ramiz Ahmed 42-yard field goal, 11:36. Tied 3–3. Drive: 6 plays • 53 yards • 2:30
- STL – Gary Jennings Jr. 4-yard pass from Harrison Frost (kick failed), 2:39. Battlehawks 9–3. Drive: 6 plays • 53 yards • 2:30

Third quarter

- STL – Steven McBride 11-yard pass from Harrison Frost (Ramiz Ahmed kick), 5:08. Battlehawks 16–3. Drive: 11 plays • 64 yards • 5:01

Fourth quarter

- No scoring plays

Top passers

- STL – Harrison Frost – 22/40, 242 yards, 2 TD, INT
- LOU – Chandler Rogers – 15/32, 199 yards, INT

Top rushers

- STL – Jarveon Howard – 16 rushes, 56 yards
- LOU – James Robinson – 7 rushes, 13 yards

Top receivers

- STL – Hakeem Butler – 3 receptions, 47 yards
- LOU – Tarik Black – 4 receptions, 72 yards

The Kings struggled offensively against a stout Battlehawks defense, led by 2025 UFL Defensive Player of the Year Pita Taumoepenu, who recorded two sacks. The unit totaled six sacks, nine tackles for loss, four pass breakups, and one interception. Louisville managed just 12 net rushing yards on 13 attempts and finished with only 166 total offensive yards, with their only points coming on the opening drive when Tanner Brown converted a 40-yard field goal. In the second quarter, Ramiz Ahmed tied the game with a 42-yard field goal for St. Louis. Battlehawks quarterback Harrison Frost later threw touchdown passes to Gary Jennings Jr. and Steven McBride. With the 16–3 victory, St. Louis improved to 4–2, while Louisville fell to 2–4.

==== Week 7: at DC Defenders ====
Week 7: Louisville Kings at DC Defenders – Game summary

Quarter	1	2	3	4	Total
Kings	0	10	10	10	30
Defenders	0	13	0	0	13

at Audi Field • Washington, D.C.

- Date: May 9
- Game time: 1:30 p.m. EDT
- Game weather: Partly cloudy, 70 °F (21 °C)
- Game attendance: 7,950
- Referee: Jason Autrey
- TV announcers (Fox): Kevin Kugler, Joel Klatt and Jake Butt
- Game Book

Game information

First quarter

- No scoring plays

Second quarter

- LOU – Tanner Brown 48-yard field goal, 11:12. Kings 3–0. Drive: 11 plays • 50 yards • 5:38
- DC – Javon Antonio 81-yard pass from Jordan Ta'amu (two-point pass failed), 9:28. Defenders 6–3. Drive: 3 plays • 81 yards • 1:44
- DC – Ty Scott 20-yard pass from Jordan Ta'amu (Matt McCrane kick), 1:50. Defenders 13–3. Drive: 12 yards • 75 yards • 5:39
- LOU – Tarik Black 9-yard pass from Chandler Rogers (Tanner Brown kick), 0:38. Defenders 13–10. Drive: 6 yards • 51 yards • 1:12

Third quarter

- LOU – Tanner Brown 50-yard field goal, 10:04. Tied 13–13. Drive: 8 yards • 33 yards • 4:56
- LOU – Tarik Black 6-yard pass from Chandler Rogers (Tanner Brown kick), 7:52. Kings 20–13. Drive: 4 plays • 55 yards • 2:01

Fourth quarter

- LOU – James Robinson 1-yard run (Tanner Brown kick), 13:47. Kings 23–13. Drive: 2 plays • 23 yards • 0:35
- LOU – Tanner Brown 49-yard field goal, 4:30. Kings 30–13. Drive: 9 plays • 44 yards • 5:15

Top passers

- LOU – Chandler Rogers – 17/26, 201 yards, 2 TD
- DC – Jordan Ta'amu – 18/33, 353 yards, 2 TD, 2 INT

Top rushers

- LOU – Ian Wheeler – 8 rushes, 64 yards
- DC – Deon Jackson – 12 rushes, 26 yards

Top receivers

- LOU – Tarik Black – 5 receptions, 49 yards, 2 TD
- DC – Ty Scott – 5 receptions, 78 yards, TD

In the first of two consecutive games against the defending UFL champions, the first quarter was scoreless after both teams missed a field goal attempt in their only scoring opportunities. Louisville kicker Tanner Brown opened the scoring in the second quarter with a 48-yard field goal. D.C. responded on its ensuing drive when quarterback Jordan Ta'amu connected with Javon Antonio for an 81-yard touchdown on a third-and-15 play. Ta'amu later threw a 20-yard touchdown pass to Ty Scott to extend the Defenders' lead to 13–3. Trailing 13–3, Louisville responded with quarterback Chandler Rogers' first passing touchdown of the season, a 9-yard strike to Tarik Black. The score ended a streak of 14 consecutive offensive possessions without a touchdown and cut the deficit to 13–10 at halftime. D.C. later drove into the red zone before halftime, but failed to run another play due to clock mismanagement.

After Brown connected on a 50-yard field goal to tie the game, Rogers once again found Black for a 6-yard touchdown pass to give Louisville a 20–13 lead. On D.C.'s next possession, Louisville defensive back Keaton Ellis intercepted Ta'amu, setting up a 1-yard touchdown run by James Robinson. Brown capped the scoring with a 49-yard field goal, his third of the game, securing Louisville's 30–13 victory and snapping the Defenders' five-game winning streak.

==== Week 8: vs. DC Defenders ====
Week 8: DC Defenders at Louisville Kings – Game summary

Quarter	1	2	3	4	Total
Defenders	7	10	7	6	30
Kings	13	4	3	13	33

at Lynn Family Stadium • Louisville, Kentucky

- Date: May 16
- Game time: 12:00 p.m. EDT
- Game weather: Overcast, 71 °F (22 °C)
- Game attendance: 10,025
- Referee: Francisco Villar
- TV announcers (ABC): Roy Philpott, Roddy Jones, Harry Douglas and Cole Cubelic
- Game Book

Game information

First quarter

- DC – Ty Scott 41-yard pass from Jordan Ta'amu (Matt McCrane kick), 14:42. Defenders 7–0. Drive: 1 play • 41 yards • 0:18
- LOU – Tyler Hudson 92-yard kickoff return (Tanner Brown kick), 14:29. Tied 7–7.
- LOU – Tanner Brown 39-yard field goal, 9:55. Kings 10–7. Drive: 4 plays • –7 yards • 1:52
- LOU – Tanner Brown 28-yard field goal, 6:28. Kings 13–7. Drive: 4 plays • 1 yards • 1:56

Second quarter

- LOU – Tanner Brown 60-yard four-point field goal, 8:58. Kings 17–7. Drive: 6 plays • 47 yards • 2:53
- DC – Matt McCrane 51-yard field goal, 3:33. Kings 17–10. Drive: 8 plays • 14 yards • 4:32
- DC – Abram Smith 21-yard run (Matt McCrane kick), 0:29. Tied 17–17. Drive: 6 plays • 63 yards • 1:20

Third quarter

- LOU – Tanner Brown 35-yard field goal, 9:18. Kings 20–17. Drive: 11 plays • 53 yards • 5:42
- DC – Xazavian Valladay 13-yard run (Matt McCrane kick), 5:45. Defenders 24–20. Drive: 7 plays • 71 yards • 3:33

Fourth quarter

- LOU – James Robinson 1-yard run (kick failed), 11:59. Kings 26–24. Drive: 16 plays • 87 yards • 8:46
- LOU – Isaiah Winstead 24-yard pass from Chandler Rogers (Tanner Brown kick), 7:43. Kings 33–24. Drive: 4 plays • 35 yards • 1:56
- DC – Deon Jackson 3-yard run (three-point pass failed), :28. Kings 33–30. Drive: 8 plays • 52 yards • 1:37

Top passers

- DC – Spencer Sanders – 7/15, 83 yards, INT
- LOU – Chandler Rogers – 11/20, 143 yards, TD, INT

Top rushers

- DC – Xazavian Valladay – 13 rushes, 107 yards, TD
- LOU – James Robinson – 20 rushes, 59 yards, TD

Top receivers

- DC – Erik Ezukanma – 4 receptions, 55 yards
- LOU – Isaiah Winstead – 5 receptions, 92 yards, TD

The contest was delayed for more than 35 minutes due to lightning warnings. DC's Xazavian Valladay returned the opening kickoff 54 yards into Louisville territory. On the first offensive play of the game, quarterback Jordan Ta'amu connected with Ty Scott for a 41-yard touchdown. Louisville responded on the ensuing kickoff, as Tyler Hudson returned the kick 92 yards for a touchdown to tie the game. On DC's following drive, Louisville cornerback Corey Mayfield intercepted a pass from Ta'amu, leading to a 39-yard field goal by Tanner Brown. On the Defenders’ next possession, Ta'amu's pass deflected off the hands of wide receiver Cornell Powell and was intercepted by Mekhi Garner, who returned the ball inside the red zone. Louisville capitalized with another Brown field goal from 28 yards out. Ta'amu suffered an injury on DC's next drive and was replaced by quarterback Spencer Sanders, who had previously appeared in only one game as a receiver two weeks earlier against the Dallas Renegades, recording three receptions for 13 yards. Following a DC turnover on downs, Louisville quarterback Chandler Rogers was intercepted inside the red zone by Bryce Thompson. Ta'amu briefly returned for one play before Sanders re-entered the game, while Ta'amu was later ruled out with a right knee injury. After a DC punt, Brown converted a 60-yard four-point field goal to extend Louisville's lead to 17–7. On DC's next drive, Louisville defensive tackle Travis Bell forced and recovered a fumble by running back Abram Smith. However, Rogers lost a fumble on the following play after being sacked, giving possession back to the Defenders. Matt McCrane subsequently converted a 51-yard field goal for DC. Following a Louisville punt, Smith scored on a 21-yard touchdown run in the final minute of the half, tying the game at 17–17 entering halftime.

Both teams scored on their opening possessions of the second half, as Brown converted a 35-yard field goal for Louisville, while DC answered with a 14-yard touchdown run by Valladay. Louisville later regained the lead on a 1-yard touchdown run by James Robinson following a 16-play drive that consumed more than eight minutes of game clock. Brown's extra point attempt was blocked, making the score 26–24. After a Defenders three-and-out, Rogers connected with Isaiah Winstead for a 24-yard touchdown pass. Sanders was intercepted on DC's following drive by Steele Chambers, though the Defenders later forced a turnover on downs near midfield to regain possession. Running back Deon Jackson scored on a 3-yard touchdown run in the final 30 seconds, but Sanders’ three-point conversion pass attempt to Erik Ezukanma fell incomplete, cutting Louisville's lead to 33–30. The Defenders then attempted a fourth-and-12 conversion from their own 28-yard line in an effort to retain possession, though Sanders’ pass was incomplete.

==== Week 9: vs. Dallas Renegades ====
Week 9: Dallas Renegades at Louisville Kings – Game summary

Quarter	1	2	3	4	Total
Renegades	7	3	0	13	23
Kings	3	10	3	21	37

at Lynn Family Stadium • Louisville, Kentucky

- Date: May 24
- Game time: 4:00 p.m. EDT
- Game weather: Rain and mist, 71 °F (22 °C)
- Game attendance: 10,378
- Referee: James Carter
- TV announcers (Fox): Kevin Kugler, Devin Gardner and Jake Butt
- Game Book

Game information

First quarter

- DAL – Tyler Vaughns 36-yard pass from Austin Reed (Colton Theaker kick), 12:35. Renegades 7–0. Drive: 5 plays, 64 yards, 2:25
- LOU – Tanner Brown 45-yard field goal, :46. Renegades 7–3. Drive: 5 plays • 38 yards • 3:03

Second quarter

- DAL – Colton Theaker 49-yard field goal, 13:33. Renegades 10–3. Drive: 4 plays • –6 yards • 2:13
- LOU – Chandler Rogers 1-yard run (Tanner Brown kick), 5:44. Tied 10–10. Drive: 8 plays • 78 yards • 3:34
- LOU – Tanner Brown 35-yard field goal, :21. Kings 13–10. Drive: 7 plays • 69 yards • 1:35

Third quarter

- LOU – Tanner Brown 54-yard field goal, 10:46. Kings 16–10. Drive: 7 plays • 28 yards • 4:14

Fourth quarter

- DAL – Curtis Hodges 12-yard pass from Austin Reed (Colton Theaker kick), 13:43. Renegades 17–16. Drive: 7 plays • 62 yards • 3:57
- LOU – Isaiah Winstead 40-yard pass from Chandler Rogers (Chandler Rogers–James Robinson two-point pass), 12:13. Kings 24–17. Drive: 3 plays • 60 yards • 1:30
- LOU – Ian Wheeler 1-yard run (two-point pass failed), 7:47. Kings 30–17. Drive: 8 plays • 69 yards • 4:06
- LOU – Tarik Black 22-yard pass from Chandler Rogers (Tanner Brown kick), 3:28. Kings 37–17. Drive: 5 plays • 39 yards • 2:35
- DAL – Lorenzo Lingard 12-yard run (kick failed), 1:30. Kings 37–23. Drive: 5 plays • 63 yards • 1:58

Top passers

- DAL – Austin Reed – 7/21, 101 yards, 2 TD, INT
- LOU – Chandler Rogers – 16/21, 266 yards, 2 TD

Top rushers

- DAL – Lorenzo Lingard – 16 rushes, 56 yards, TD
- LOU – Ian Wheeler – 13 rushes, 93 yards, TD

Top receivers

- DAL – Curtis Hodges – 2 receptions, 39 yards, TD
- LOU – Tarik Black – 4 receptions, 82 yards, TD

Louisville entered the matchup needing consecutive victories to clinch a playoff berth, while Dallas entered on a five-game losing streak and also needed consecutive wins to avoid playoff elimination. On the first play from scrimmage, Renegades running back Ellis Merriweather suffered an injury after a 20-yard run and did not return; he had scored two touchdowns in the teams’ previous meeting. Later in the opening drive, quarterback Austin Reed connected with Tyler Vaughns for a 36-yard touchdown on fourth-and-two. On Louisville's opening possession, Dallas forced a fumble by James Robinson at the goal line to prevent a scoring opportunity. Following a Dallas punt that Lucky Jackson initially returned for a touchdown, a successful super challenge overturned the score due to a block in the back penalty. Tanner Brown later converted a 45-yard field goal for Louisville, while Dallas answered with a 49-yard field goal by Colton Theaker. On the Kings’ ensuing drive, Chandler Rogers connected with Kaden Prather to set up first-and-goal at the 1-yard line before scoring on a quarterback sneak. In the final minute of the half, Brown added a 35-yard field goal to give Louisville a 13–10 halftime lead. At halftime, Reed had completed just one of eight passes for a 36-yard touchdown to Vaughns, while Rogers completed 11 of 12 passes for 164 yards as Louisville outgained Dallas 250–88 in total yardage.

On Louisville's opening drive of the second half, Brown converted a 54-yard field goal, which accounted for the only points of the third quarter. Dallas’ lone scoring opportunity in the period ended with a missed field goal attempt by Theaker. The Renegades regained the lead in the fourth quarter when Reed connected with Curtis Hodges for a 12-yard touchdown pass. Louisville responded when Rogers found Isaiah Winstead for a 40-yard touchdown. Following an interception by Eric Garror on a Reed pass, the Kings extended their lead on a 1-yard touchdown run by Ian Wheeler, who finished the game with 93 rushing yards on 13 carries. After a Dallas turnover on downs, Rogers threw his second touchdown pass of the game, connecting with Tarik Black on a 22-yard score. Backup quarterback Luke Lehnen later led the Renegades on a scoring drive in his lone possession, capped by a 12-yard touchdown run by Lorenzo Lingard. With the 37–23 victory, Louisville earned its third consecutive win. The Kings rushed for 205 yards on 32 carries and scored two rushing touchdowns. Despite committing penalties totaling 156 yards, Louisville outgained Dallas 470–234 in total offense. Linebacker Cam Gill recorded two sacks, increasing his season total to 10, which led the UFL through nine games. The loss eliminated Dallas from playoff contention, while the victory created a win-and-in scenario for Louisville.

==== Week 10: at Columbus Aviators ====
Week 10: Louisville Kings at Columbus Aviators – Game summary

Quarter	1	2	3	4	Total
Kings	14	14	0	14	42
Aviators	14	7	6	0	27

at Historic Crew Stadium • Columbus, Ohio

- Date: May 31
- Game time: 6:00 p.m. EDT
- Game weather: Sunny, 77 °F (25 °C)
- Game attendance: 10,705
- Referee: Francisco Villar
- TV announcers (Fox): Kevin Kugler, Joel Klatt and Jake Butt
- Game Book

Game information

First quarter

- LOU – Eric Garror 28-yard interception return (Tanner Brown kick), 14:47. Kings 7–0.
- CLB – Jonah Dalmas 58-yard field goal, 9:51. Kings 7–3. Drive: 9 plays • 31 yards • 4:56
- CLB – Keke Chism 22-yard pass from Jalen Morton (Jonah Dalmas kick), 8:25. Aviators 10–7. Drive: 3 plays • 25 yards • 1:20
- LOU – Chandler Rogers 16-yard run (Tanner Brown kick), 4:10. Kings 14–10. Drive: 7 plays • 37 yards • 4:15
- CLB – Jonah Dalmas 61-yard four-point field goal, 0:24. Tied 14–14. Drive: 7 plays • 20 yards • 3:46

Second quarter

- LOU – Ian Wheeler 4-yard run (Tanner Brown kick), 3:53. Kings 21–14. Drive: 12 plays • 51 yards • 6:43
- CLB – Toa Taua 2-yard run (Jonah Dalmas kick), 1:11. Tied 21–21. Drive: 8 plays • 72 yards • 2:41
- LOU – Isaiah Winstead 14-yard pass from N'Kosi Perry (Jonah Dalmas kick), 0:22. Kings 28–21. Drive: 6 plays • 59 yards • 0:49

Third quarter

- CLB – Jonah Dalmas 49-yard field goal, 7:23. Kings 28–24. Drive: 8 plays • 45 yards • 5:05
- CLB – Jonah Dalmas 51-yard field goal, 1:15. Kings 28–27. Drive: 9 plays • 25 yards • 4:01

Fourth quarter

- LOU – Jaden Shirden 17-yard run (Tanner Brown kick), 6:47. Kings 35–27. Drive: 6 plays • 50 yards • 3:11
- LOU – Jaden Shirden 4-yard run (Tanner Brown kick), 1:14. Kings 42–27. Drive: 4 plays • 70 yards • 1:43

Top passers

- LOU – N'Kosi Perry – 8/13, 89 yards, TD
- CLB – Jalen Morton – 14/38, 221 yards, TD, INT

Top rushers

- LOU – Ian Wheeler – 14 rushes, 99 yards, TD
- CLB – Toa Taua – 13 rushes, 70 yards

Top receivers

- LOU – Lucky Jackson – 4 receptions, 20 yards
- CLB – John Lovett – 4 receptions, 40 yards

On May 30, the Houston Gamblers defeated the Birmingham Stallions, helping Louisville clinch a playoff berth. As a result, the Kings rested several key players, including running back James Robinson, who led the UFL with 50.0 rushing yards per game. Columbus entered the game coming off a victory over Birmingham that had also improved Louisville's playoff position. The Aviators were led by quarterback Jalen Morton, who had accounted for four touchdowns and 309 total yards the previous week, earning UFL Offensive Player of the Week honors.

The game began with Morton's opening pass being intercepted and returned for a touchdown by Eric Garror. Columbus answered on its next possession with a 58-yard field goal by Jonah Dalmas. The ensuing kickoff was fumbled by Tyler Hudson, giving the Aviators favorable field position. Columbus capitalized on the turnover when Morton connected with Keke Chism for a 22-yard touchdown pass. On his first and only possession before being rested for the playoffs, Louisville quarterback Chandler Rogers scored on a 16-yard read-option run. An eventful first quarter concluded with an on-field altercation that resulted in the ejection of Cameron Dantzler. The drive later ended with Dalmas converting a 61-yard four-point field goal to tie the game at 14–14. The teams traded touchdowns in the second quarter, with Ian Wheeler scoring for Louisville and Columbus' Toa Taua finding the end zone for the Aviators. Backup quarterback N'Kosi Perry then threw a 14-yard touchdown pass to Isaiah Winstead in the final minute of the half, giving Louisville a 28–21 lead at intermission. The third quarter featured two more Dalmas field goals. After Louisville turned the ball over on downs, Dalmas missed a potential go-ahead 61-yard field goal attempt. In the fourth quarter, third-string quarterback Mike DiLiello led two scoring drives, both ending with touchdown runs by Jaden Shirden, his first and second touchdowns of the season.

Louisville secured a 42–27 victory and finished the regular season by winning six of its final seven games. The Kings became the first UFL team to qualify for the playoffs after starting the season 0–3.

== Standings ==
2026 UFL standings
Team	W	L	PCT	GB	TD+/-	TD+	TD-	PF	PA	DIFF	STK
(y) Orlando Storm	8	2	.800	–	9	26	17	232	186	46	W4
(x) St. Louis Battlehawks	6	4	.600	2	-2	21	23	212	197	15	L1
(x) Louisville Kings	6	4	.600	2	1	27	26	265	219	46	W4
(x) DC Defenders	5	5	.500	3	6	31	25	281	224	57	L4
(e) Dallas Renegades	4	6	.400	4	2	30	28	224	259	-35	W1
(e) Birmingham Stallions	4	6	.400	4	-1	24	25	190	229	-39	L2
(e) Houston Gamblers	4	6	.400	4	-6	20	26	189	236	-60	W1
(e) Columbus Aviators	3	7	.300	5	-6	27	33	216	259	-43	L1
(x)–clinched playoff berth; (y)–clinched conference; (e)–eliminated from playoff contention

== Postseason ==
All times Eastern

Week	Day	Date	Kickoff	TV	Opponent	Results		Location	Attendance
Week	Day	Date	Kickoff	TV	Opponent	Score	Record	Location	Attendance
Semifinals	Sunday	June 7	6:00 p.m.	Fox	at St. Louis Battlehawks	W 29–20	1–0	The Dome at America's Center	18,111
United Bowl	Saturday	June 13	3:00 p.m.	ABC	vs. DC Defenders	W 27–20	2–0	Audi Field	19,023

=== UFL Semifinals: at St. Louis Battlehawks ===
UFL Semifinals: Louisville Kings at St. Louis Battlehawks – Game summary

Quarter	1	2	3	4	Total
Kings	11	0	7	11	29
Battlehawks	3	14	3	0	20

at The Dome at America's Center • St. Louis, Missouri

- Date: June 7
- Game time: 6:00 p.m. EDT
- Game weather: Patchy rain nearby, 86 °F (30 °C)
- Game attendance: 18,111
- Referee: Adam Savoie
- TV announcers (Fox): Curt Menefee, Joel Klatt and Brock Huard
- Game Book

Game information

First quarter

- LOU – James Robinson 53-yard run (Tanner Brown kick), 11:02. Kings 7–0. Drive: 4 plays • 74 yards • 2:01
- STL – Ramiz Ahmed 37-yard field goal, 4:21. Kings 7–3. Drive: 12 plays • 49 yards • 6:41
- LOU – Tanner Brown 60-yard four-point field goal, 1:52. Kings 11–3. Drive: 5 plays • 23 yards • 2:29

Second quarter

- STL – Jarveon Howard 1-yard run (Ramiz Ahmed kick), 11:48. Kings 11–10. Drive: 10 plays • 61 yards • 5:04
- STL – Blake Jackson 12-yard pass from Luis Perez (Ramiz Ahmed kick), 1:48. Battlehawks 17–11. Drive: 6 plays • 43 yards • 2:17

Third quarter

- LOU – Isaiah Winstead 9-yard pass from Chandler Rogers (Tanner Brown kick), 5:23. Kings 18–17. Drive: 6 plays • 89 yards • 3:22
- STL – Ramiz Ahmed 45-yard field goal, 1:00. Battlehawks 20–18. Drive: 7 plays • 50 yards • 4:23

Fourth quarter

- LOU – Ian Wheeler 51-yard run (Tanner Brown kick), 11:46. Kings 25–20. Drive: 2 plays • 62 yards • 0:42
- LOU – Tanner Brown 63-yard four-point field goal, 4:41. Kings 29–20. Drive: 4 plays • 9 yards • 2:09

Top passers

- LOU – Chandler Rogers – 12/20, 162 yards, TD
- STL – Luis Perez – 27/45, 249 yards, TD, INT

Top rushers

- LOU – Ian Wheeler – 7 rushes, 89 yards, TD
- STL – Jarveon Howard – 15 rushes, 70 yards, TD

Top receivers

- LOU – Lucky Jackson – 4 receptions, 38 yards
- STL – Steven McBride – 6 receptions, 84 yards

The game marked Louisville's inaugural playoff appearance, while St. Louis made its third consecutive postseason appearance and sought its first playoff victory. The Battlehawks were also without three-time All-UFL center Mike Panasiuk, who suffered a calf injury during pregame warmups and was ruled out shortly before kickoff. Following a Battlehawks punt, Kings running back James Robinson broke free for a 53-yard touchdown run. Louisville's defense then produced a red-zone stand on the ensuing possession before Ramiz Ahmed connected on a 37-yard field goal. Tanner Brown ended the first-quarter scoring with a 60-yard four-point field goal, giving Louisville an 11–3 lead. A Louisville pass interference penalty in the end zone set up a 1-yard touchdown run by St. Louis running back Jarveon Howard on the Battlehawks' following drive. In the final two minutes of the half, St. Louis took its first lead when quarterback Luis Perez found Blake Jackson for a 12-yard touchdown pass. Louisville threatened to answer before halftime, but a trick-play double pass ended when wide receiver Tyler Hudson, after receiving the initial pass, threw an interception to Battlehawks defensive back Myles Sims, sending St. Louis into halftime with a 17–11 lead.

On Louisville's opening possession of the second half, quarterback Chandler Rogers found wide receiver Isaiah Winstead for a 54-yard reception on third-and-four from the Kings' own 35-yard line. Two plays later, the duo connected again for a 9-yard touchdown. St. Louis responded on its next possession with a 45-yard field goal by Ahmed, regaining the lead, 20–18, at the end of the third quarter. Following punts by both teams, Kings running back Ian Wheeler scored on a 51-yard touchdown run. On the play, he received a key block from wide receiver Tarik Black that was challenged by St. Louis, but the ruling on the field stood, giving Louisville a 25–20 lead. After St. Louis turned the ball over on downs near midfield, Brown connected on his second four-point field goal, this time from 63 yards out. On St. Louis' final drive, Perez led the Battlehawks inside the red zone, but his pass was intercepted in the end zone by Steele Chambers. With the 29–20 victory, Louisville advanced to face the defending UFL champion DC Defenders, who defeated the top-seeded Orlando Storm 29–23 earlier in the day. They also became the first team in UFL history to win a playoff game after an 0–3 start.

=== United Bowl: vs. DC Defenders ===
2026 United Bowl: DC Defenders vs. Louisville Kings – Game summary

Quarter	1	2	3	4	Total
Defenders	3	13	0	4	20
Kings	0	7	6	14	27

at Audi Field • Washington, D.C.

- Date: June 13
- Game time: 3:00 p.m. EDT
- Game weather: Partly cloudy, 89 °F (32 °C)
- Game attendance: 19,023
- Referee: Kole Knueppel
- TV announcers (ABC): Joe Tessitore (play-by-play), Jordan Rodgers (analyst), Sam Acho (sideline reporter), Tom Luginbill (sideline reporter) and Tyler Fulghum (betting)
- Game Book

Game information

First quarter

- DC – Matt McCrane 48-yard field goal, 6:43. Defenders 3–0. Drive: 6 plays • 52 yards • 2:51

Second quarter

- LOU – Eric Garror 12-yard fumble return (Tanner Brown kick), 11:43. Kings 7–3.
- DC – Xazavian Valladay 51-yard run (Matt McCrane kick), 9:45. Defenders 10–7. Drive: 4 plays • 74 yards • 1:50
- DC – Matt McCrane 43-yard field goal, 2:00. Defenders 13–7. Drive: 10 plays • 53 yards • 5:19
- DC – Matt McCrane 28-yard field goal, 0:02. Defenders 16–7. Drive: 4 plays • 3 yards • 1:18

Third quarter

- LOU – Tanner Brown 57-yard field goal, 11:42. Defenders 16–10. Drive: 6 plays • 23 yards • 3:18
- LOU – Tanner Brown 38-yard field goal, 6:08. Defenders 16–13. Drive: 8 plays • 59 yards • 3:44

Fourth quarter

- LOU – Ian Wheeler 44-yard run (Tanner Brown kick), 14:53. Kings 20–16. Drive: 7 plays • 84 yards • 4:03
- LOU – James Robinson 16-yard run (Tanner Brown kick), 12:07. Kings 27–16. Drive: 2 plays • 25 yards • 0:40
- DC – Matt McCrane 61-yard four-point field goal, 9:11. Kings 27–20. Drive: 5 plays • 10 yards • 3:00

Top passers

- DC – E.J. Perry – 5/12, 50 yards, INT
- LOU – Chandler Rogers – 9/17, 81 yards, 2 INT

Top rushers

- DC – Xazavian Valladay – 4 rushes, 111 yards, TD
- LOU – Ian Wheeler – 10 rushes, 81 yards, TD

Top receivers

- DC – Cornell Powell – 3 receptions, 40 yards
- LOU – Tarik Black – 1 reception, 40 yards

=== Matchup ===
The matchup marked the third meeting between the two teams during the season, with Louisville winning the previous two contests. DC made its third championship game appearance in franchise history and its second in the UFL. Although the game was originally designated as a neutral-site championship, it was held at the home stadium of the Defenders. The Defenders entered the game without 2025 UFL championship game MVP quarterback Jordan Ta'amu, who suffered a torn ACL during a Week 8 loss to the Kings. Following an ineffective performance by backup quarterback Spencer Sanders against Orlando, DC turned to third-string quarterback Jason Bean for its Week 10 matchup against the Storm, a game the Defenders lost. Bean, however, later led DC to an upset playoff victory over top-seeded Orlando after the Storm had defeated the Defenders in each of their previous two meetings. Bean began the season as Louisville's starting quarterback, starting the first four games before being traded to DC in exchange for Mike DiLiello. The move opened the door for Chandler Rogers, who went 5–1 as Louisville's starter during the regular season before leading the Kings to a playoff victory over the St. Louis Battlehawks. The championship game also marked the first on-field meeting between Bean and Rogers, who were teammates at Lake Ridge High School in Mansfield, Texas. The only previous collegiate connection between the two came in 2019, when Rogers was redshirting at Southern Miss and Bean served as a backup at North Texas. Rogers did not appear in the game, while Bean threw a touchdown pass in Southern Mississippi's 45–27 victory.

==== First half ====
Following punts on both opening possessions, scoring opened with a Matt McCrane 48-yard field goal for DC. After Louisville's second consecutive punt, DC running back Xazavian Valladay broke free for a 54-yard run before being chased down and tackled by Keaton Ellis, who forced a fumble that bounced 35 yards into the end zone where Cameron Dantzler recovered for a Louisville touchback.

Early in the second quarter, Rogers was intercepted by Kai Gray. On DC's ensuing possession, a completion from Bean to Ty Scott was forced loose by Corey Mayfield, and the fumble was recovered and returned 12 yards for a Louisville touchdown by Eric Garror, giving the Kings a 7–3 lead. Valladay later redeemed himself on DC's next drive, scoring on a 51-yard touchdown run to regain the lead. Following a Louisville punt, McCrane added a 57-yard field goal for DC. On Louisville's next possession, Rogers was intercepted again by Gray, setting up a 28-yard McCrane field goal that extended DC's lead to 16–7 at halftime. Despite both quarterbacks being held to fewer than 50 passing yards, the Defenders outgained the Kings 227–62 and held a 209–41 advantage on the ground, while both teams committed two turnovers. Artist 50 Cent performed the halftime show.

==== Second half ====
Louisville scored its first offensive points of the contest on its opening drive with a Tanner Brown 57-yard field goal, set up by a 19-yard run from James Robinson. On DC's ensuing possession, Bean suffered a left shoulder separation on an incomplete third-down pass attempt, ruling him out for the remainder of the game. Brown later cut the deficit to three points with his second field goal of the game, a 38-yard kick. DC then turned to quarterback E. J. Perry, who had been signed on May 25 and had not appeared in the Week 10 game or playoffs to that point. Following a DC three-and-out, Louisville running back Ian Wheeler broke free for a 44-yard go-ahead touchdown run on the first play of the fourth quarter, his eighth touchdown of the season.

After generating just six offensive yards in the third quarter, DC's ensuing drive was derailed when Perry's long completion to Cornell Powell was negated by offensive pass interference. On the same drive, Perry was shortly afterwards intercepted on a deep post route by Dantzler, who returned it 47 yards to the DC 25-yard line. Two plays later, Robinson broke multiple tackles on a 16-yard touchdown run, extending Louisville's lead to 27–16 with just over 12 minutes remaining. A strong kickoff return by Valladay to midfield sparked a promising drive, but multiple penalties stalled the possession. McCrane salvaged the drive with a 60-yard four-point field goal, his fourth of the season, cutting the deficit to 27–20 with just over nine minutes remaining. Following a Louisville three-and-out, Perry led DC inside the red zone. On fourth down from inside the Kings’ 10-yard line, his pass sailed over Powell and fell incomplete with under two minutes remaining. With no timeouts remaining, DC was unable to stop the clock, and Louisville ran out the clock to secure a 27–20 victory and the championship. The Kings finished the season winning eight of their final nine games.

Running back Ian Wheeler was named the game's most valuable player, rushing for 81 yards on 10 carries, including the go-ahead 44-yard touchdown run in the fourth quarter. He also returned a kickoff for 28 yards.

== Awards and honors ==
Recipient	Award(s)
Jaden Shirden	Week 3: UFL Special Teams Player of the Week
Cam Gill	Week 4: UFL Defensive Player of the Week; All-UFL; Defensive Player of the Year
Tanner Brown	Week 4, 8, 9: UFL Special Teams Player of the Week; All-UFL; Special Teams Player of the Year
Quindell Johnson	Week 5: UFL Special Teams Player of the Week
Corey Mayfield Jr.	All-UFL
Ian Wheeler	2026 United Bowl Most Valuable Player
