= Antonio Grier =

American football player (born 2000)

Profile
- Position: Linebacker

Personal information
- Born: January 18, 2000 (age 26); Atlanta, Georgia, U.S.
- Listed height: 6 ft 0 in (1.83 m)
- Listed weight: 230 lb (104 kg)

Career information
- High school: Benjamin Elijah Mays (Atlanta)
- College: South Florida (2018–2022); Arkansas (2023)
- NFL draft: 2024: undrafted

Career history
- Tampa Bay Buccaneers (2024); Louisville Kings (2026); Chicago Bears (2026)*
- * Offseason or practice squad member only

Awards and highlights
- UFL champion (2026); 2× Second team All-AAC (2020, 2021)

Career NFL statistics as of 2024
- Tackles: 1
- Stats at Pro Football Reference

Antonio Grier Jr. (born January 18, 2000) is an American professional football linebacker. He played college football for the South Florida Bulls and Arkansas Razorbacks and was signed as an undrafted free agent by the Buccaneers in 2024.

== Early life ==
Grier was born on January 18, 2000, in Atlanta, Georgia. He attended Benjamin Elijah Mays High School in Atlanta, playing three seasons of football team while recording 214 tackles, 19.0 tackles-for-loss (TFLs), six sacks, eight forced fumbles and three interceptions. He was honorable mention All-Class 6A as a junior and was named the regional defensive player of the year as a senior. He signed to play college football for the South Florida Bulls in 2018.

== College career ==
As a freshman at South Florida in 2018, Grier appeared in 12 games, posting eight tackles and a fumble recovery. In 2019, he appeared in all 12 games, six as a starter, and made 58 tackles, 8.5 TFLs and 4.0 sacks. The following year, he earned second-team All-American Athletic Conference (AAC) honors after posting 59 tackles, 5.5 TFLs and 3.0 sacks in eight games. In 2021, he started 12 games and posted a team-leading 92 tackles with eight TFLs, three sacks and two interceptions, repeating as a second-team All-AAC selection. Grier played in the first three games of the 2022 season, recording 21 tackles, before suffering a season-ending hand injury and choosing to redshirt.

Grier opted to transfer following the 2022 season, signing to play with the Arkansas Razorbacks for his final year of college football. On his first play with Arkansas, he intercepted a pass and returned it for a touchdown. Playing as the third linebacker for Arkansas, he finished seventh on the team with 36 tackles in his lone year as a Razorback. He declared for the 2024 NFL draft.

== Professional career ==
Pre-draft measurables
Height	Weight	Arm length	Hand span	Wingspan	40-yard dash	10-yard split	20-yard split	20-yard shuttle	Three-cone drill	Vertical jump	Broad jump	Bench press
5 ft 11 7/8 in (1.83 m)	230 lb (104 kg)	30 1/2 in (0.77 m)	9 3/4 in (0.25 m)	6 ft 1 5/8 in (1.87 m)	4.64 s	1.56 s	2.62 s	4.39 s	7.44 s	36.5 in (0.93 m)	9 ft 10 in (3.00 m)	22 reps
All values from Pro Day

=== Tampa Bay Buccaneers ===
After going unselected in the 2024 NFL draft, Grier signed with the Tampa Bay Buccaneers as an undrafted free agent. He was waived on August 27, 2024, and re-signed to the practice squad the following day. He was signed to the active roster off the practice squad on October 1. He was waived on November 22, and re-signed to the practice squad. On December 7, Grier was promoted to the active roster. On December 31, the Buccaneers re-signed Grier to their practice squad. He signed a reserve/future contract on January 14, 2025.

On August 26, 2025, Grier was waived by the Buccaneers with an injury designation as part of final roster cuts.

=== Louisville Kings ===
On February 19, 2026, Grier signed with the Louisville Kings of the United Football League (UFL).

=== Chicago Bears ===
On August 25, 2026, Grier signed with the Chicago Bears. On August 30, Grier was waived by the Bears as a part of final roster cuts.
