= Chandler Rogers =

American football player (born 2001)

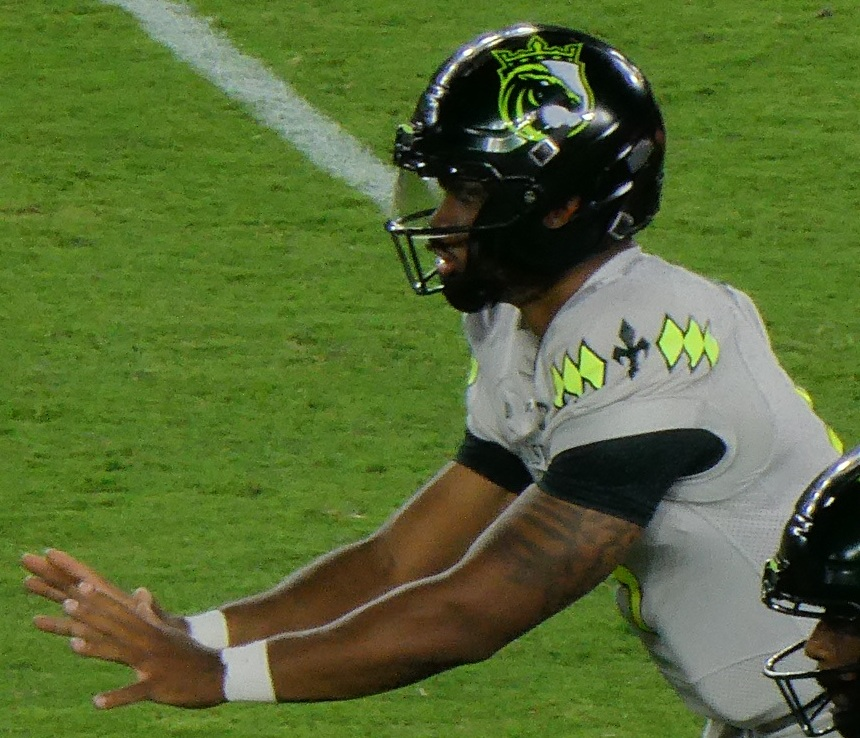
- Rogers with the Louisville Kings in 2026

No. 4 – Louisville Kings
- Position: Quarterback
- Roster status: Active

Personal information
- Born: October 23, 2001 (age 25); Mansfield, Texas, U.S.
- Listed height: 6 ft 0 in (1.83 m)
- Listed weight: 197 lb (89 kg)

Career information
- High school: Lake Ridge (Mansfield)
- College: Southern Miss (2019); Blinn (2020); Louisiana–Monroe (2021–2022); North Texas (2023); California (2024)
- NFL draft: 2025: undrafted

Career history
- Louisville Kings (2026–present)

Awards and highlights
- UFL champion (2026)
- Stats at ESPN

Chandler Rogers (born October 23, 2001) is an American football quarterback for the Louisville Kings of the United Football League (UFL). He previously played for the Southern Miss Golden Eagles, the Blinn Buccaneers, the Louisiana–Monroe Warhawks, the North Texas Mean Green and California Golden Bears.

== Early life ==
Rogers grew up in Mansfield, Texas and attended Lake Ridge High School. In his high school career, Rogers completed 243 of his 390 pass attempts for 3,497 yards and 34 touchdowns, to 17 interceptions. Rogers would also rush for 2,464 yards and 29 touchdowns. He was rated a three-star recruit and committed to play college football at Southern Miss over offers from Air Force, Seton Hill, Southern and Texas Southern.

== College career ==
=== Southern Miss ===
On December 19, 2018, Rogers signed his National Letter of Intent to play for the Southern Miss Golden Eagles. He enrolled at Southern Miss on July 1, 2019. As a true freshman in 2019, Rogers was redshirted while serving behind starting quarterback Jack Abraham and backup Tate Whatley. He made his collegiate debut in a Week 3 victory over Troy but did not record any statistics. In Week 5, Rogers recorded two carries for six yards in a win over UTEP, which were his only statistics of the season.

=== Blinn ===
Rogers played the 2021 spring season at Blinn College. He was named the starting quarterback and made his Buccaneers debut in the season opener against Kilgore College, accounting for three touchdowns in a loss. Rogers missed the following two games before returning against New Mexico Military Institute, where he accounted for 324 total yards and two touchdowns, including a season-high 131 rushing yards. Despite outgaining opposing quarterback Diego Pavia, Blinn fell 35–16. The Buccaneers were unable to record a victory in Rogers' next three starts, and he did not play in the season finale. During the shortened spring season, Rogers started all five games in which he appeared, completing 67 of 139 passes for 988 yards, eight touchdowns, and six interceptions. He also rushed for 395 yards and four touchdowns.

His play earned him offers from several FCS programs in the SWAC, including Grambling State, Prairie View A&M, and Texas Southern. He later received an FBS offer from Louisiana–Monroe on June 28, 2021, and committed to the program the same day.

=== Louisiana–Monroe ===
Rogers began the 2021 season as the backup quarterback to Rhett Rodriguez. He made his Warhawks debut in a Week 1 loss against Kentucky, where he led the team in rushing. He appeared the following week in a victory over Jackson State, leading the team in carries in the 12–7 win while primarily serving as a running threat. In Week 3, Rodriguez suffered a chest injury during a victory over Troy. Rogers started the next six games, with his best performance coming against South Alabama, when he passed for 369 yards and four touchdowns in a 41–31 win. For his performance, he was named Sun Belt Conference Offensive Player of the Week and was also named a Manning Award Quarterback of the Week. Following a loss to Texas State, Rodriguez returned as the starter for the final three games of the season, though Rogers started at running back in the home finale against Arkansas State. Overall, Rogers appeared in 12 games with seven starts, throwing for 1,311 yards and nine touchdowns with three interceptions, while also adding 367 rushing yards and one rushing touchdown. He totaled 1,678 yards of total offense on 476 offensive snaps, accounting for 10 total touchdowns.

In 2022, following the graduation of Rodriguez, Rogers won the starting quarterback competition against teammate Jiya Wright. Rogers and the Warhawks finished the season with a 4–8 record, though he posted notable performances in Weeks 7 and 8 against Coastal Carolina and South Alabama. Against the Chanticleers, Rogers completed 27 of 30 passes (90.0%) for 279 yards and two touchdowns in a 28–21 loss. The following week against Jaguars, he threw for a season-high 371 yards and four touchdowns in a 41–34 loss. On the season, he completed 67.5% of his passes for 2,403 yards with 15 touchdowns and seven interceptions, while also adding 353 rushing yards and five rushing touchdowns. He also recorded a receiving touchdown in a comeback victory over Texas State after overcoming a 21-point deficit.

On November 29, 2022, Rogers announced that he would be entering the transfer portal.

=== North Texas ===
On January 10, 2023, Rogers announced that he would transfer to the North Texas Mean Green. Rogers lost the starting quarterback competition to Stone Earle entering the 2023 season. He made his North Texas debut in the season opener against California, appearing in relief during the loss. Rogers again came off the bench the following week against FIU, accounting for three second-half touchdowns in a 46–39 defeat. Following the FIU game, Rogers was named the starting quarterback. In his first start for the Mean Green, he led North Texas to its first victory of the season against Louisiana Tech, completing 24 of 40 passes for 313 yards and two touchdowns. He also engineered the game-winning drive that set up a 31-yard field goal in the closing moments of the 40–37 victory. In Week 8 against Memphis, Rogers threw for a career-high 411 yards and five touchdowns while completing 32 of 49 passes. During the 2023 season, Rogers appeared in 12 games and started the final 10, passing for 3,382 yards and 29 touchdowns while adding four rushing touchdowns. His 2023 campaign ranks among the most productive single seasons by a quarterback in North Texas history, and he finished among the program's single-season leaders in several passing categories. On December 5, 2023, Rogers entered the transfer portal.

=== California ===
On December 11, 2023, Rogers announced he would be transferring to California. Rogers lost the starting quarterback competition to Fernando Mendoza entering the 2024 season. He nevertheless appeared in scheduled formations and made his California debut in a season-opening victory over UC Davis. His first touchdown as a Golden Bear came in Week 5 against No. 8 Miami, scoring on a 9-yard rushing touchdown in a 39–38 loss. In Week 12, with Mendoza sidelined by illness, Rogers made his first career start for California against No. 9 SMU, completing 8 of 15 passes for 84 yards in a 38–6 defeat. During the 2024 season, Rogers appeared in eight games, completing 12 of 25 passes for 117 yards. He also rushed 29 times for 86 yards and one touchdown and recorded one reception for three yards. On January 6, 2025, Rogers announced that he would enter the NCAA transfer portal. However, he ultimately opted to forgo another transfer and declared for the NFL Draft.

=== Statistics ===
Season	Team	Games			Passing								Rushing			
Season	Team	GP	GS	Record (Note: Accounts for only GS as a QB. On 11/13/21 Rogers started at RB.)	Cmp	Att	Pct	Yds	Y/A	TD	Int	Rtg	Att	Yds	Avg	TD
2019	Southern Miss	2	0	—	0	0	0.0	0	0.0	0	0	0.0	2	6	3.0	0
2021	Louisiana–Monroe	12	7	2−4	112	179	62.6	1,311	7.3	9	3	137.3	139	367	2.6	1
2022	Louisiana–Monroe	12	12	4−8	216	320	67.5	2,403	7.5	15	7	141.7	145	353	2.4	5
2023	North Texas	12	10	5−5	262	422	62.1	3,382	8.0	29	5	150.1	109	180	1.7	4
2024	California	8	1	0–1	12	25	44.4	117	4.7	0	0	87.3	29	86	3.0	1
Career		46	30	11−18	602	946	63.6	7,213	7.6	53	15	143.0	424	992	2.3	11

== Professional career ==
Pre-draft measurables
Height	Weight	Arm length	Hand span	Wingspan	40-yard dash	10-yard split	20-yard split	20-yard shuttle	Three-cone drill	Vertical jump	Broad jump
5 ft 11 3/8 in (1.81 m)	197 lb (89 kg)	30 1/2 in (0.77 m)	9 5/8 in (0.24 m)	6 ft 2 3/8 in (1.89 m)	4.62 s	1.62 s	2.68 s	4.34 s	7.52 s	36.0 in (0.91 m)	10 ft 0 in (3.05 m)
All values from Pro Day

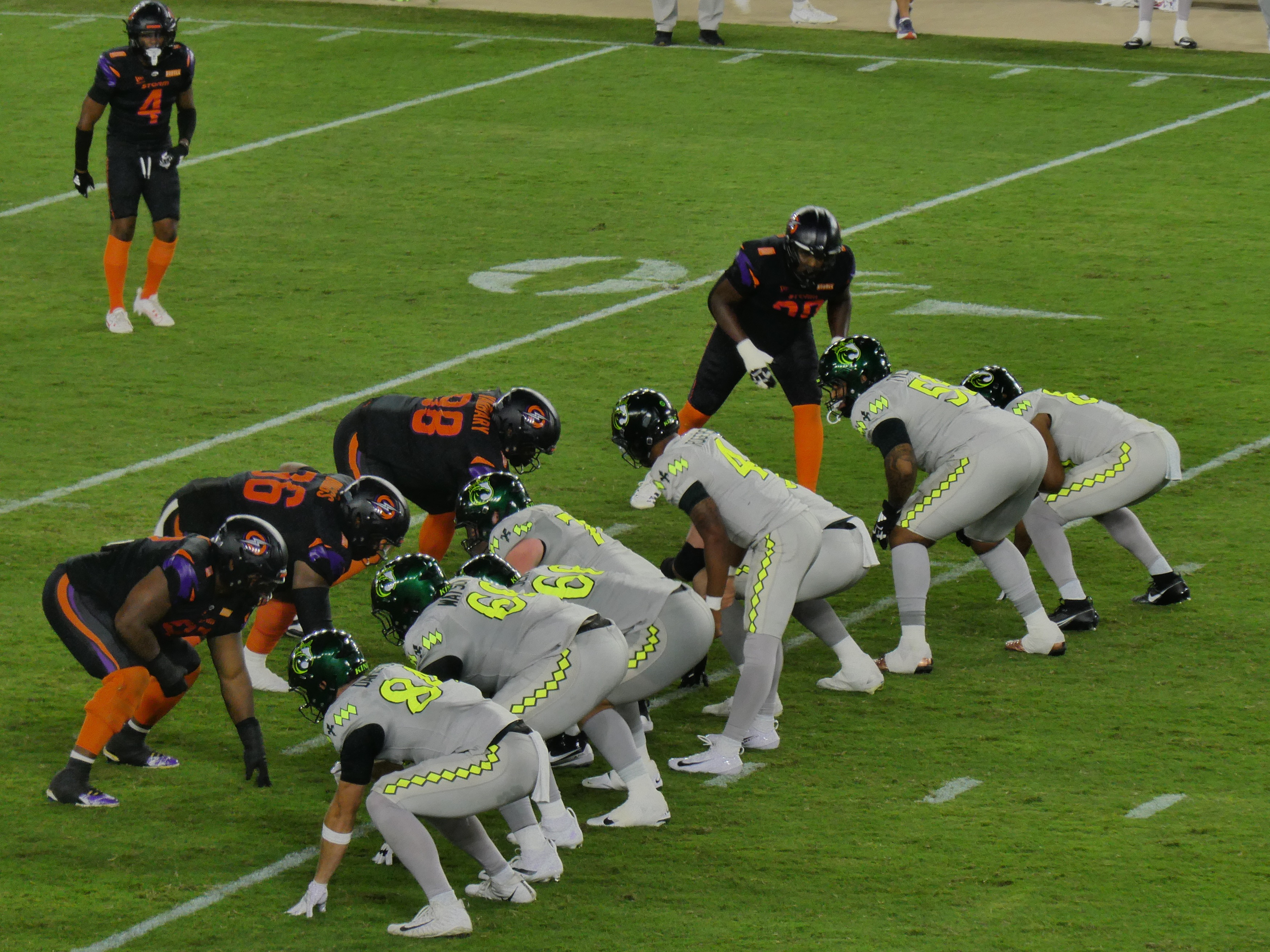
Rogers (center, No. 4) with Louisville Kings playing against the Orlando Storm in 2026.

On January 12, 2026, Rogers was allocated to the Louisville Kings of the United Football League (UFL). He began the season as the backup quarterback to former high school teammate Jason Bean. Rogers made his professional debut in Week 2 against the Orlando Storm, entering in relief of Bean and completing 13 of 20 passes for 151 yards and one interception in the loss. Following a 1–3 start, the Kings traded Bean to the DC Defenders, elevating Rogers to the starting quarterback role. He led Louisville to a 5–1 record over the remainder of the regular season. During that span, the Kings scored at least 30 points in five of six games and 42 or more points in two contests. Rogers completed 86 of 138 passes for 1,118 yards, five touchdowns, and three interceptions, while also rushing for 106 yards and two touchdowns. The Kings finished the regular season 6–4 and earned the No. 3 seed in the playoffs. In the semifinals, they faced the St. Louis Battlehawks, the only team Rogers had lost to as a starter during the regular season. He completed 12 of 20 passes for 162 yards and a touchdown in a 29–20 victory. In the 2026 United Bowl, the Kings defeated the DC Defenders 27–20. Facing Bean, who started for DC, Rogers completed 9 of 17 passes for 81 yards and two interceptions. Despite two first-half turnovers, he led four second-half scoring drives to overcome a 16–7 halftime deficit and secure the championship.

== UFL career statistics ==
Legend
League champion

=== Regular season ===
Season	Team	Games			Passing								Rushing			
Season	Team	GP	GS	Record	Cmp	Att	Pct	Yds	Y/A	TD	Int	Rtg	Att	Yds	Avg	TD
2026	LOU	9	6	5–1	86	138	62.3	1,118	8.1	5	3	90.8	24	104	4.3	2
Career		9	6	5–1	86	138	62.3	1,118	8.1	5	3	90.8	24	104	4.3	2

=== Postseason ===
Season	Team	Games			Passing								Rushing			
Season	Team	GP	GS	Record	Cmp	Att	Pct	Yds	Y/A	TD	Int	Rtg	Att	Yds	Avg	TD
2026	LOU	2	2	2–0	21	37	56.8	243	6.6	1	2	63.2	11	51	4.6	0
Career		2	2	2–0	21	37	56.8	243	6.6	1	2	63.2	11	51	4.6	0
