= Mike DiLiello =

American football player (born 2000)

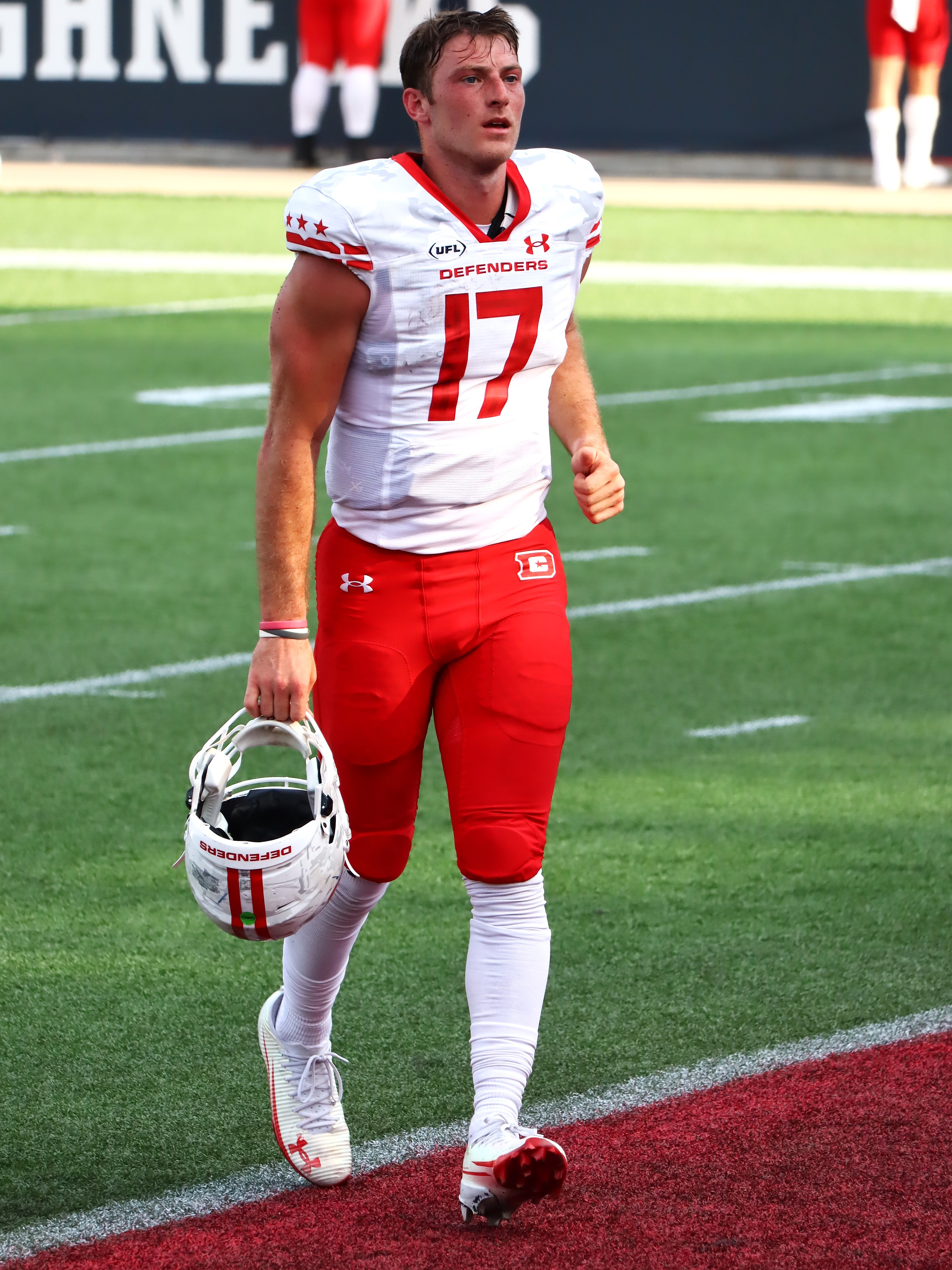
- DiLiello with the DC Defenders in 2025

No. 5 – Louisville Kings
- Position: Quarterback
- Roster status: Active

Personal information
- Born: April 13, 2000 (age 26); Pembroke Pines, Florida, U.S.
- Listed height: 6 ft 0 in (1.83 m)
- Listed weight: 200 lb (91 kg)

Career information
- High school: Cooper City
- College: Florida Tech (2018–2019); Middle Tennessee (2020–2021); Austin Peay (2022–2023)
- NFL draft: 2024: undrafted

Career history
- DC Defenders (2024–2026); Louisville Kings (2026–present)

Awards and highlights
- 2x UFL champion (2025, 2026); UAC Offensive Player of the Year (2023); First-team All-UAC (2023)

Mike DiLiello (born April 13, 2000) is an American professional football quarterback for the Louisville Kings of the United Football League (UFL). He previously played college football at Florida Tech, Middle Tennessee, and Austin Peay.

== Early life and college ==
DiLiello attended Cooper City High School in Cooper City, Florida. As a senior, he was named second team all-county and lettered in three sports.

=== Florida Tech ===
DiLiello began his collegiate career at Florida Tech. He redshirted during the 2018 season and did not appear in a game. In 2019, DiLiello appeared in all 11 games and completed 141-of-232 attempts for 1,773 yards while throwing 12 touchdowns to six interceptions. He was named Gulf South Conference Freshman of the Week twice and also earned Offensive Player of the Week as well.

=== Middle Tennessee ===
In 2020, DiLiello transferred to Middle Tennessee. He made his NCAA Division I Football Bowl Subdivision (FBS) debut against Troy where he completed 3-of-4 passes for 35 yards and a touchdown. His first FBS touchdown was thrown to wide receiver Jaylin Lane on a 28-yard pass. In 2021, DiLiello appeared in 12 games as a backup and was used primarily as a dual-threat quarterback. He led the Blue Raiders with six rushing touchdowns on just 49 attempts. In the Bahamas Bowl against Toledo, he ran four 44 yards and a touchdown. On February 8, 2022, DiLiello entered the transfer portal.

=== Austin Peay ===
On May 11, 2022, DiLiello announced that he was transferring to Austin Peay of the NCAA Division I Football Championship Subdivision (FCS). In 2022, DiLiello completed 200-of-328 passes for 2,447 yards and 21 touchdowns. On the season, he scored a touchdown in every game except the season finale against Alabama. In 2023, DiLiello completed 242-of-362 passes for 3,164 yards and 28 touchdowns. In a game against FBS Tennessee, DiLiello threw for 260 yards and a touchdown. The following week against East Tennessee State, he threw for a career high 441 yards and five touchdowns. After the season, he was named Offensive Player of the Year and first team all-conference. He was also named FCS third-team All-America twice. In his two year stint with the Governors, he became the leader in passing yards, touchdowns, completion percentage, efficiency, passing yards per game, total touchdowns responsible for and total offense per game. He became the only quarterback in school history to throw for back-to-back 2,000+ yard seasons.

=== Statistics ===
Season	Team	Games			Passing								Rushing			
Season	Team	GP	GS	Record	Cmp	Att	Pct	Yds	Y/A	TD	Int	Rtg	Att	Yds	Avg	TD
2018	Florida Tech	0	0	—	Redshirted (redshirt)											
2019	Florida Tech	11	7	3–4	141	232	60.8	1,773	0.0	12	6	136.9	139	660	4.8	11
2020	Middle Tennessee	1	0	—	3	4	75.0	35	8.8	1	0	231.0	2	6	3.0	0
2021	Middle Tennessee	12	0	—	29	49	59.2	267	5.4	1	2	103.5	49	264	5.4	6
2022	Austin Peay	11	11	7–4	200	328	61.0	2,447	7.5	21	11	138.1	120	446	3.7	8
2023	Austin Peay	12	12	9–3	242	362	66.9	3,164	8.7	28	10	160.3	123	203	1.7	5
Career		47	30	19–11	615	975	63.1	7,686	0.0	63	29	144.7	433	1,579	3.7	30

== Professional career ==
Pre-draft measurables
Height	Weight	Arm length	Hand span	Wingspan	40-yard dash	10-yard split	20-yard split	20-yard shuttle	Three-cone drill	Vertical jump	Broad jump	Bench press
6 ft 0 3/4 in (1.85 m)	211 lb (96 kg)	31 1/4 in (0.79 m)	9 1/4 in (0.23 m)	6 ft 5 3/8 in (1.97 m)	4.79 s	1.70 s	2.70 s	4.31 s	7.40 s	33.5 in (0.85 m)	9 ft 5 in (2.87 m)	19 reps
All values from Pro Day

In 2024, DiLiello received an invitation to the Tennessee Titans rookie minicamp.

=== DC Defenders ===
On May 15, 2024, DiLiello signed with the DC Defenders of the United Football League (UFL). On October 16, he re-signed with the Defenders for the 2025 season.

On January 12, 2026, DiLiello was selected by the DC Defenders in the 2026 UFL draft.

=== Louisville Kings ===
On April 19, 2026, DiLiello was traded to the Louisville Kings in exchange for quarterback Jason Bean.

== UFL career statistics ==
Legend
League champion

Year	Team	Games			Passing									Rushing				
Year	Team	GP	GS	Record	Cmp	Att	Pct	Yds	Y/A	Lng	TD	Int	Rtg	Att	Yds	Y/A	Lng	TD
2024	DC	2	0	—	0	0	0.0	0	0.0	0	0	0	0.0	0	0	0.0	0	0
2025	DC	5	1	0–1	36	56	64.3	359	6.4	53	2	0	94.3	17	68	4.0	18	0
2026	DC	1	0	—	0	0	0.0	0	0.0	0	0	0	0.0	2	–1	–1.0	–1	0
2026	LOU	1	0	—	6	8	75.0	58	7.2	18	0	0	94.8	4	9	4.5	7	0
Career		9	1	0–1	42	64	65.6	417	6.5	53	2	0	94.3	21	77	3.7	18	0
