= Tanner Brown =

American football player (born 1999)

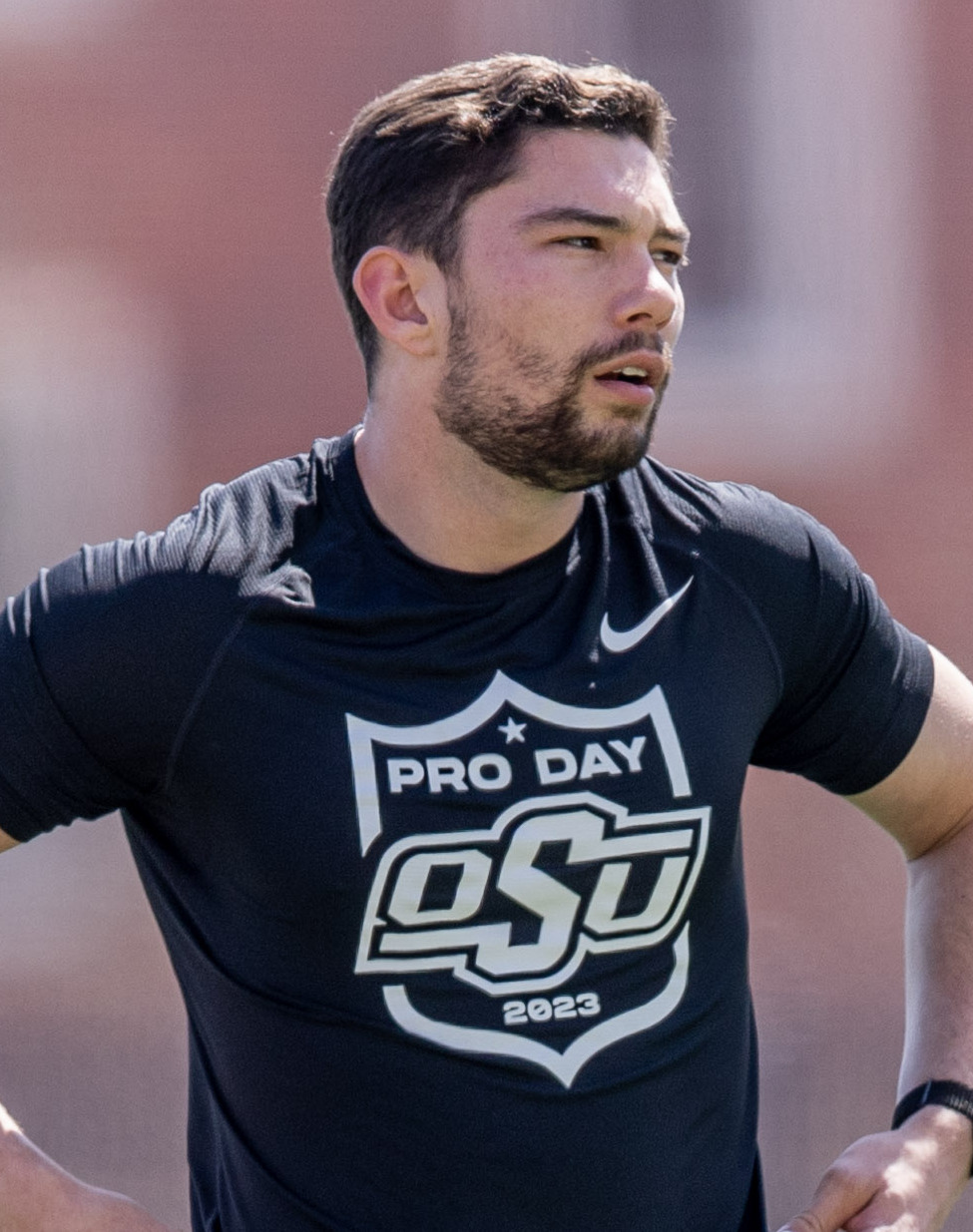
- Brown at his college Pro Day in 2023

Profile
- Position: Placekicker

Personal information
- Born: December 28, 1999 (age 26); Santa Clarita, California, U.S.
- Listed height: 6 ft 0 in (1.83 m)
- Listed weight: 177 lb (80 kg)

Career information
- High school: Saugus (Santa Clarita)
- College: College of the Canyons (2018–2019); UNLV (2020); Oklahoma State (2021–2022)
- NFL draft: 2023: undrafted

Career history
- Los Angeles Rams (2023–2024)*; Atlanta Falcons (2024)*; Louisville Kings (2026); New Orleans Saints (2026)*
- * Offseason or practice squad member only

Awards and highlights
- UFL champion (2026); UFL Special Teams Player of the Year (2026); All-UFL Team (2026); UFL field goals leader (2026); Second-team All-Big 12 (2022)
- Stats at Pro Football Reference

Tanner Reid Brown (born December 28, 1999) is an American professional football placekicker. He played college football for the College of the Canyons Cougars, UNLV Rebels and Oklahoma State Cowboys.

== Early life ==
Brown was born on December 28, 1999, in Santa Clarita, California. He played soccer until trying out football as a sophomore at Saugus High School. He played both sports for the rest of his time at Saugus, and as a senior in football went 7-for-11 on field goals and 16-for-18 on extra points while playing placekicker. He also played at punter and punted 37 times for 1,242 yards in 2017. Brown graduated as part of the class of 2018.

== College career ==
Brown began his collegiate career with the College of the Canyons in 2018, serving as both their placekicker and punter. He helped them to back-to-back division championships in 2018 and 2019 and was named an All-American as well as an all-conference selection at both positions. At placekicker, he made 28-of-38 field goal attempts and all but two of his 102 extra point attempts. In 2020, Brown walked-on to play for the UNLV Rebels and appeared in six games during their COVID-19-shortened season, making 24 kickoffs and 12 punts.

After one season at UNLV, Brown, looking to transfer, contacted coaches from around the country, but only received one reply, from a special teams analyst for the Oklahoma State Cowboys. He was eventually able to join the team as a walk-on and saw significant playing time in his first season with the Cowboys, taking over kickoff duties starting in the second game and then serving as their kicker for field goals and extra points for the final 10 games. He was successful on all 36 of his extra point attempts and made 17-of-21 field goals, earning honorable mention all-conference honors. The following season, Brown was named team captain and was one of the top placekickers nationally, converting 22-of-23 field goal attempts and all of his extra points. He ranked third in the FBS for field goal percentage (95.7%) and also placed fifth for field goals per game (1.83) and seventh for points per game (9.0), being named second-team All-Big 12 Conference and a semifinalist for the Lou Groza Award, given to the best placekicker in college football. Despite playing only two years with Oklahoma State, Brown scored 195 points, placing him 15th in school history.

== Professional career ==
Pre-draft measurables
Height	Weight	Arm length	Hand span	Wingspan
6 ft 0 5/8 in (1.84 m)	177 lb (80 kg)	29 1/4 in (0.74 m)	8 7/8 in (0.23 m)	5 ft 10 3/4 in (1.80 m)
All values from Pro Day

=== Los Angeles Rams ===
After going unselected in the 2023 NFL draft, Brown was signed by the Los Angeles Rams as an undrafted free agent, being one of two kickers signed by the team to compete for the starting role. Christopher Dunn, the other player signed, was released on June 16, leaving Brown as the team's only kicker. He was waived on August 29, 2023.

On January 18, 2024, Brown signed a reserve/future contract with the Rams. He was waived on August 13. Brown was re-signed to the Rams' practice squad on September 17 following an injury to starting kicker Joshua Karty. He was released again on October 1.

=== Atlanta Falcons ===
On December 16, 2024, Brown was signed to the Atlanta Falcons' practice squad. He was released by Atlanta two days later.

=== Louisville Kings ===
On January 14, 2026, Brown was selected by the Louisville Kings of the United Football League (UFL). On May 16, Brown hit a 60-yard four-point field goal in a 33–30 victory over the DC Defenders. He scored another four-point 60-yard field goal against the St. Louis Battlehawks on June 7 during the UFL playoffs. Later in the same game Brown scored a 63-yard four-point field goal. Brown is the only kicker across professional football to score two 60-yard field goals in the same game.

=== New Orleans Saints ===
On June 17, 2026, Brown was signed by the New Orleans Saints. On August 30, Brown was waived.

== Career statistics ==
Legend
League champion

=== UFL ===
==== Regular season ====
Year	Team	GP	Field goals				Points
Year	Team	GP	FGA	FGM	Lng	Pct	Points
2026	LOU	15	25	28	60	89.3	98
Career		15	25	28	60	89.3	98

==== Postseason ====
Year	Team	GP	Field goals				Points
Year	Team	GP	FGA	FGM	Lng	Pct	Points
2026	LOU	2	4	4	63	100.0	18
Career		2	4	4	63	100.0	18
