= Cameron Dantzler =

American football player (born 1998)

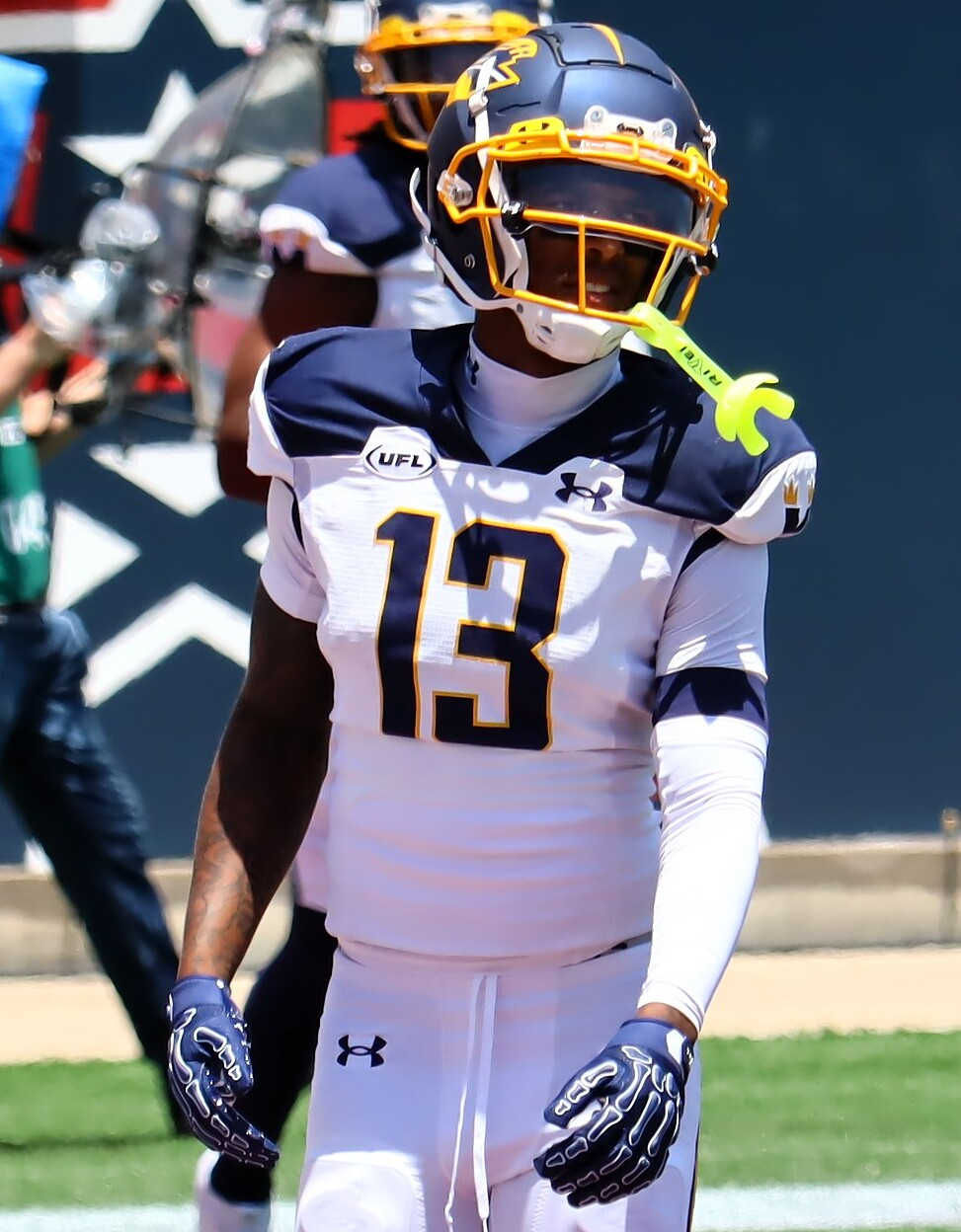
- Dantzler with the Memphis Showboats in 2025

No. 3 – Louisville Kings
- Position: Cornerback
- Roster status: Active

Personal information
- Born: September 3, 1998 (age 28); Hammond, Louisiana, U.S.
- Listed height: 6 ft 2 in (1.88 m)
- Listed weight: 192 lb (87 kg)

Career information
- High school: Saint Thomas Aquinas (Hammond)
- College: Mississippi State (2017–2019)
- NFL draft: 2020: 3rd round, 89th overall pick

Career history
- Minnesota Vikings (2020–2022); Washington Commanders (2023)*; Buffalo Bills (2023)*; Houston Texans (2023)*; New Orleans Saints (2023); San Antonio Brahmas (2024); Hamilton Tiger-Cats (2024)*; Memphis Showboats (2025); Miami Dolphins (2025)*; Louisville Kings (2026–present)
- * Offseason or practice squad member only

Awards and highlights
- UFL champion (2026); PFWA All-Rookie Team (2020); Second-team All-SEC (2018)

Career NFL statistics
- Total tackles: 149
- Forced fumbles: 3
- Fumble recoveries: 2
- Pass deflections: 17
- Interceptions: 3
- Stats at Pro Football Reference

Cameron Dantzler Sr. (born September 3, 1998) is an American professional football cornerback for the Louisville Kings of the United Football League (UFL). He played college football for the Mississippi State Bulldogs and was selected in the third round of the 2020 NFL draft by the Minnesota Vikings.

== Early life ==
Dantzler attended Saint Thomas Aquinas High School in Hammond, Louisiana. He played cornerback and quarterback in high school. As a senior, he passed for 1,381 yards and 11 touchdowns and rushed for 1,901 yards and 26 touchdowns. He committed to Mississippi State University to play college football.

== College career ==
Dantzler redshirted his true freshman season at Mississippi State. He played in all 13 of the Bulldogs' games as a redshirt freshman, finishing the season with 25 tackles (two for loss) with four passes defended and an interception. Dantzler entered his redshirt sophomore season as a starter, finishing the season with 43 tackles (two for loss), a sack, two interceptions and a team-leading 11 passes defended and was named second-team All-Southeastern Conference by the Associated Press. Additionally, Dantzler was one of only four cornerbacks in the conference not to surrender a touchdown pass and had a 41.1 passer rating allowed according to Pro Football Focus.

Dantzler entered his redshirt junior season on the watchlists for the Bednarik, Nagurski and Jim Thorpe Awards and was named a preseason All-American by Phil Steele. After a 2019 season where he had 2 interceptions and 10 passes defend, Dantzler decided to forgo his last year of eligibility and declared for the 2020 NFL draft.

== Professional career ==
Pre-draft measurables
| Height | Weight | Arm length | Hand span | Wingspan | 40-yard dash | 10-yard split | 20-yard split | Vertical jump |
|---|---|---|---|---|---|---|---|---|
| 6 ft 2 1/4 in (1.89 m) | 188 lb (85 kg) | 30 5/8 in (0.78 m) | 9 in (0.23 m) | 6 ft 0 3/8 in (1.84 m) | 4.64 s | 1.57 s | 2.71 s | 34.5 in (0.88 m) |
All values from NFL Combine

=== Minnesota Vikings ===
==== 2020 season ====
Dantzler was selected in the third round (89th overall) by the Minnesota Vikings in the 2020 NFL Draft. He was placed on the reserve/COVID-19 list by the team on October 28, 2020, and activated three days later. He was named to the PFWA All-Rookie Team.

Heading into his first training camp, Dantzler was listed as a starting cornerback opposite Mike Hughes. He faced competition from fellow rookie Jeff Gladney for his starting job. At the end of training camp, head coach Mike Zimmer named Dantzler the starting left cornerback opposite Hughes.

Dantzler made his first career start and NFL debut in the Vikings' season-opening loss to the Green Bay Packers. He recorded four tackles in the 43–34 loss. Dantzler missed Weeks 2 and 3 with a rib injury before returning as a starter in Week 4 against the Houston Texans, recording four tackles in the 31–23 win. Dantzler started in the Vikings' Week 5 and Week 6 games against the Seattle Seahawks and Atlanta Falcons, but was placed on the Reserve/COVID-19 list after coming into close contact with a teammate who tested positive for the virus. He missed Week 7 before returning in the Vikings' Week 8 win against the Packers. Dantzler started the game and recorded 2 solo tackles before being carted off the field and taken to the hospital due to a serious neck injury. However, he was able to return in time for the Vikings' Week 11 contest against the Dallas Cowboys. In the Vikings' Week 13 contest against the Jacksonville Jaguars, Dantzler recorded his first career interception off a pass thrown by Mike Glennon and forced a fumble on Chris Conley which he also recovered during the 27–24 overtime win. Dantzler finished his rookie season appearing in 11 games (10 starts) and recording 2 interceptions, 46 combined tackles, four passes defended, a forced fumble, and a fumble recovery.

==== 2021 season ====
In a surprise move, the Vikings chose to make Dantzler a healthy inactive in the 2021 season opener against the Cincinnati Bengals. Following Week 3, head coach Mike Zimmer stated he would be speaking with Dantzler over the latter venting his frustration over his lack of playing time on his Twitter account.

==== 2022 season ====
On November 12, 2022, Dantzler was placed on injured reserve due to an ankle injury and was later reactivated on December 10. He was released by the Vikings on March 10, 2023.

=== Washington Commanders ===
On March 13, 2023, Dantzler was claimed off waivers by the Washington Commanders. He was released on May 30.

=== Buffalo Bills ===
On June 7, 2023, Dantzler was signed by the Buffalo Bills to a one-year contract. On July 27, Dantzler was released with an injury designation.

=== Houston Texans ===
On August 22, 2023, Dantzler signed with the Houston Texans. He was waived on August 29.

=== New Orleans Saints ===
On September 20, 2023, Dantzler signed with the practice squad of the New Orleans Saints. He was signed to the active roster on November 21. Dantzler was waived on January 1, 2024.

=== San Antonio Brahmas ===
On April 10, 2024, Dantzler signed with the San Antonio Brahmas of the United Football League (UFL). He was placed on the suspended list on April 16.

=== Hamilton Tiger-Cats ===
On September 23, 2024, Dantzler signed with the Hamilton Tiger-Cats of the Canadian Football League (CFL). He was released from the team's practice roster on October 26.

=== Memphis Showboats ===
On February 3, 2025, Dantzler signed with the Memphis Showboats of the United Football League (UFL).

=== Miami Dolphins ===
On August 19, 2025, Dantzler signed with the Miami Dolphins. He was released on August 26 as part of final roster cuts.

=== Louisville Kings ===
On January 12, 2026, Dantzler was allocated to the Louisville Kings of the United Football League (UFL).

== Personal life ==
Dantzler is currently engaged and has four children with Vshati Oliver: two daughters, Carmyn and Venus, his son Casiah, and another son on the way. Dantzler also has two sons and two daughters with Cierra Chantel Shinault: Cameron Jr., Cason, Charm, and Cambrie.
