= Jaden Shirden =

American football player (born 2002)

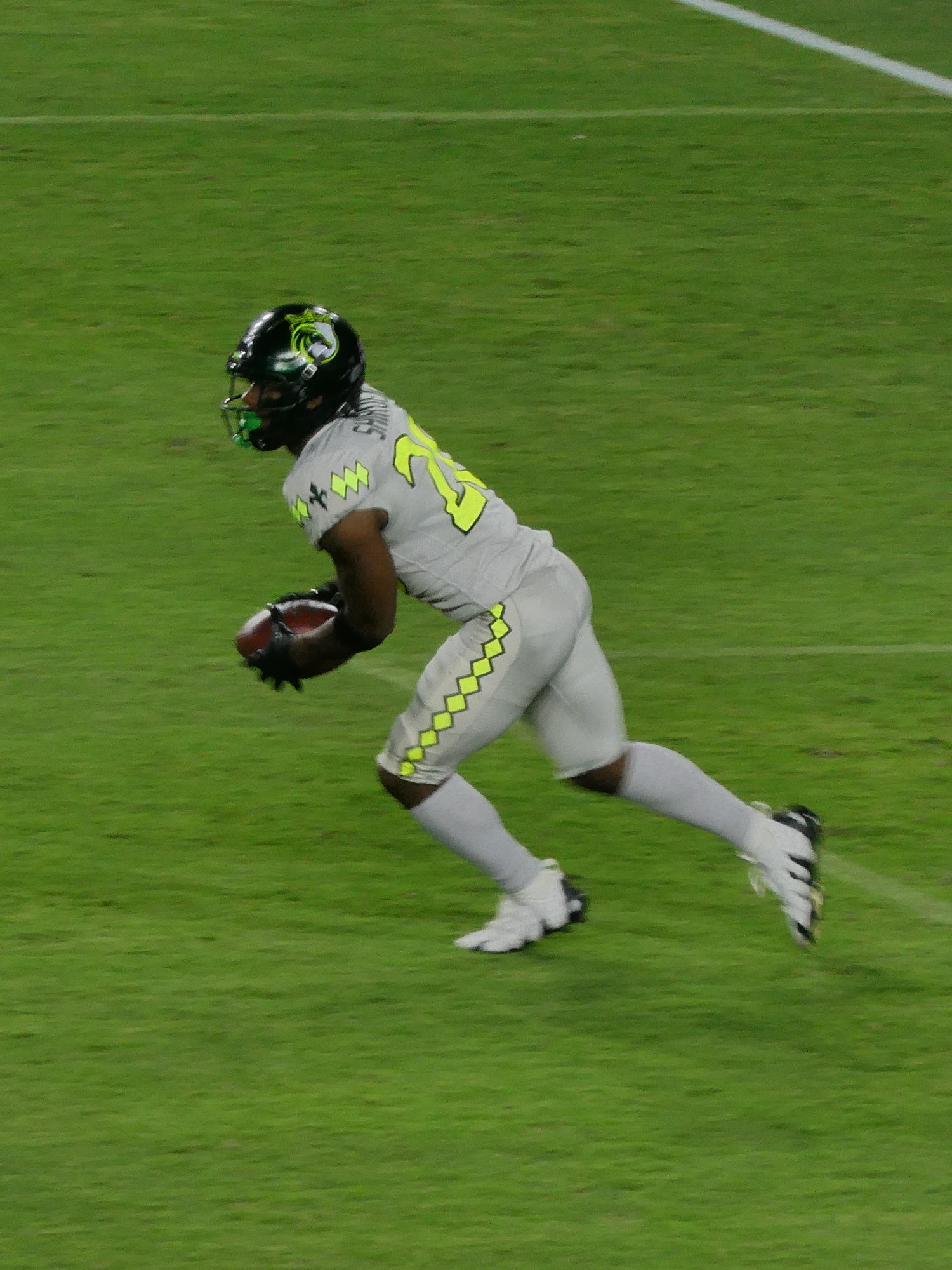
- Shirden with the Louisville Kings in 2026

No. 20 – Louisville Kings
- Position: Running back
- Roster status: Active

Personal information
- Born: May 2, 2002 (age 24); West Haven, Connecticut, U.S.
- Listed height: 5 ft 8 in (1.73 m)
- Listed weight: 189 lb (86 kg)

Career information
- High school: St. Joseph (Trumbull, Connecticut)
- College: Monmouth (2021–2023)
- NFL draft: 2024: undrafted

Career history
- Carolina Panthers (2024)*; Michigan Panthers (2025); San Antonio Brahmas (2025); Louisville Kings (2026–present)
- * Offseason or practice squad member only

Awards and highlights
- UFL champion (2026); First-team FCS All-American (2023); Second-team FCS All-American (2022); 2× CAA Offensive Player of the Year (2022, 2023); 2× First-team All-CAA (2022, 2023)
- Stats at Pro Football Reference

Jaden Shirden (born May 2, 2002) is an American professional football running back for the Louisville Kings of the United Football League (UFL). He played college football for the Monmouth Hawks.

== Early life ==
Shirden attended high school at St. Joseph's. Coming out of high school, Shirden decided to commit to play college football for the Monmouth Hawks.

== College career ==
In Shirden's freshman season in 2021, he rushed 77 times for 497 yards and three touchdowns. During the 2022 season in a matchup against Fordham, Shirden set a school record 299 rushing yards. Shirden finished the 2022 season, rushing for 1,722 yards and 13 touchdowns, where for his performance he was named the CAA player of the year and a FCS All-American. For his performance on the 2022 season, Shirden was named a finalist for the Walter Payton Award. During the 2023 season, Shirden rushed 221 times for 1,478 yards and ten touchdowns, where he was named the CAA player of the year for the second time in his career. After the conclusion of the 2023 season, Shirden decided to declare for the 2024 NFL draft.

== Professional career ==
Pre-draft measurables
Height	Weight	Arm length	Hand span	Wingspan	40-yard dash	10-yard split	20-yard split	Vertical jump	Broad jump
5 ft 8 in (1.73 m)	187 lb (85 kg)	28 3/4 in (0.73 m)	9 1/4 in (0.23 m)	5 ft 9 5/8 in (1.77 m)	4.45 s	1.51 s	2.57 s	34.5 in (0.88 m)	9 ft 9 in (2.97 m)
All values from NFL Combine

=== Carolina Panthers ===
Shirden signed with the Carolina Panthers as an undrafted free agent on May 10, 2024. He was waived on August 27.

=== Michigan Panthers ===
On January 8, 2025, Shirden signed with the Michigan Panthers of the United Football League (UFL). He was waived on May 12, 2025.

=== San Antonio Brahmas ===
Shirden was claimed off waivers by the San Antonio Brahmas on May 12, 2025. In week 9, Shirden recorded 3 kickoff returns for 150 yards with a long of 86 that led to a Brahmas field goal right before halftime. He was awarded the UFL Special Teams Player of the Week.1

=== Louisville Kings ===
On January 13, 2026, Shirden was selected by the Louisville Kings in the 2026 UFL draft.
