= Lucky Jackson =

American football player (born 1997)

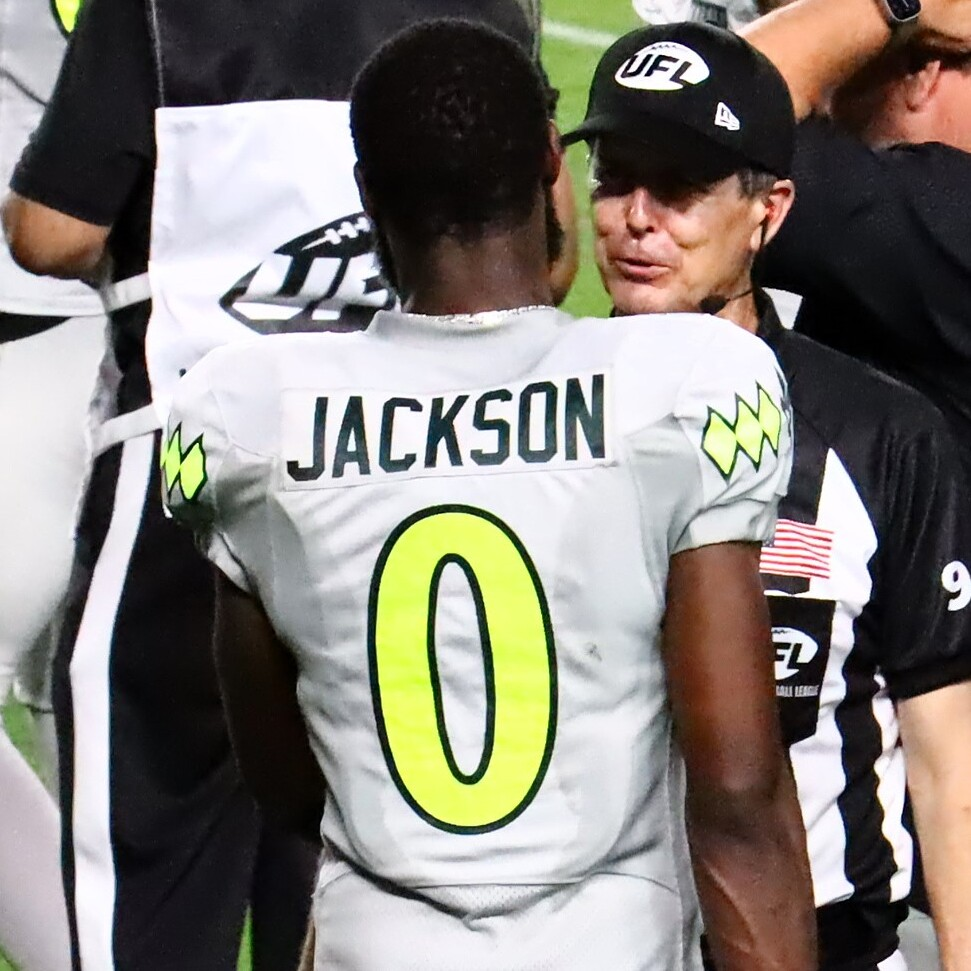
- Jackson with the Louisville Kings in 2026

No. 9 – Detroit Lions
- Position: Wide receiver
- Roster status: Practice squad

Personal information
- Born: July 17, 1997 (age 29); Lexington, Kentucky, U.S.
- Listed height: 6 ft 0 in (1.83 m)
- Listed weight: 182 lb (83 kg)

Career information
- High school: Lafayette (Lexington)
- College: Western Kentucky (2015–2019)
- NFL draft: 2020: undrafted

Career history
- Winnipeg Blue Bombers (2022)*; Edmonton Elks (2022); DC Defenders (2023); Minnesota Vikings (2023–2025); Louisville Kings (2026); Detroit Lions (2026–present)*
- * Offseason or practice squad member only

Awards and highlights
- UFL champion (2026); All-XFL Team (2023); First-team All-CUSA (2019); First Responder Bowl MVP (2019)
- Stats at Pro Football Reference

Dontavian "Lucky" Jackson (born July 17, 1997) is an American professional football wide receiver for the Detroit Lions of the National Football League (NFL). He played college football for the Western Kentucky Hilltoppers. Jackson signed with The Spring League after going undrafted in the 2020 NFL draft.

== College career ==
After being ranked a two-star recruit by Rivals.com, Jackson committed to Western Kentucky to play college football. After redshirting as a freshman in 2015, Jackson had 26 catches for 395 yards and a pair of touchdowns on the year in 2016. In 2017, Jackson had an impressive campaign, as he racked up 39 catches for 600 yards and three touchdowns. In a Nov 17 contest vs. Middle Tennessee State, he hauled in a 93-yard touchdown, which was both the longest play in WKU history as well as only one of eight 90+ yard pass plays in FBS history. As a redshirt junior, Jackson started 11 games. He had 50 catches for 552 yards and four touchdowns, leading the Hilltoppers in receptions and touchdowns. Lucky ended his Hilltopper career with a bang, putting his name in the WKU record books while leading the team with 94 receptions and 1,133 yards as well as four touchdowns. In the First Responder Bowl against Western Michigan, he earned MVP honors while hauling in 17 passes. His 94 receptions in 2019 ranked eighth in FBS that season and second in all-time WKU program history for a single season.

== Professional career ==
Pre-draft measurables
Height	Weight	Arm length	Hand span	Wingspan
6 ft 0 in (1.83 m)	179 lb (81 kg)	32 1/4 in (0.82 m)	9 5/8 in (0.24 m)	6 ft 3 7/8 in (1.93 m)
All values from Pro Day

=== The Spring League ===
After an impressing pro day, Jackson went undrafted in the 2020 NFL draft. He played for the Blues of The Spring League in 2021.

=== Winnipeg Blue Bombers ===
On April 13, 2022, Jackson signed with the Winnipeg Blue Bombers of the Canadian Football League (CFL). He was released by Winnipeg during training camp on June 5.

=== Edmonton Elks ===
On September 13, 2022, Jackson was signed to the practice roster of the Edmonton Elks of the CFL. He was promoted to the active roster on October 7. He started one game for the Elks, and was targeted three times but did not catch a pass. Jackson was moved back to the practice roster on October 14, and was released on October 21.

=== DC Defenders ===
On November 16, 2023, Jackson was selected by the DC Defenders of the XFL in the 11th round (81st overall) in the Skill Players round of the 2023 XFL draft, He played in all 10 regular season games recording over 36 catches for 573 yards with five touchdowns. He was named to the All-XFL team for the 2023 season along with teammates Jordan Ta'amu, Abram Smith, Liam Fornadel, Davin Bellamy, Michael Joseph, and Daniel Whelan.

=== Minnesota Vikings ===
On May 23, 2023, Jackson signed his first NFL contract with the Minnesota Vikings. He was released on August 29, before being re-signed to the practice squad on September 12. Jackson was elevated to the active roster for the Vikings' Week 16 and Week 17 games but reverted to the practice squad after each game. He was signed to Minnesota's active roster on January 6, 2024, before the final game of the regular season. He made three appearances for the Vikings overall over the course of the season, appearing in three snaps on offense and 32 snaps on special teams.

Jackson was waived by the Vikings on August 27, 2024, and re-signed to the practice squad. He signed a reserve/future contract with Minnesota on January 16, 2025.

On August 26, 2025, Jackson was waived by the Vikings as part of final roster cuts. He was signed to the practice squad the next day. Jackson was released from the practice squad on September 23.

=== Louisville Kings ===
On February 18, 2026, Jackson signed with the Louisville Kings of the United Football League (UFL).

=== Detroit Lions ===
On June 16, 2026, Jackson signed with the Detroit Lions. On August 30, Jackson was waived by the Lions as a part of final roster cuts; he was re-signed to the team's practice squad the following day.
