= Isaiah Winstead =

American football player (born 1999)

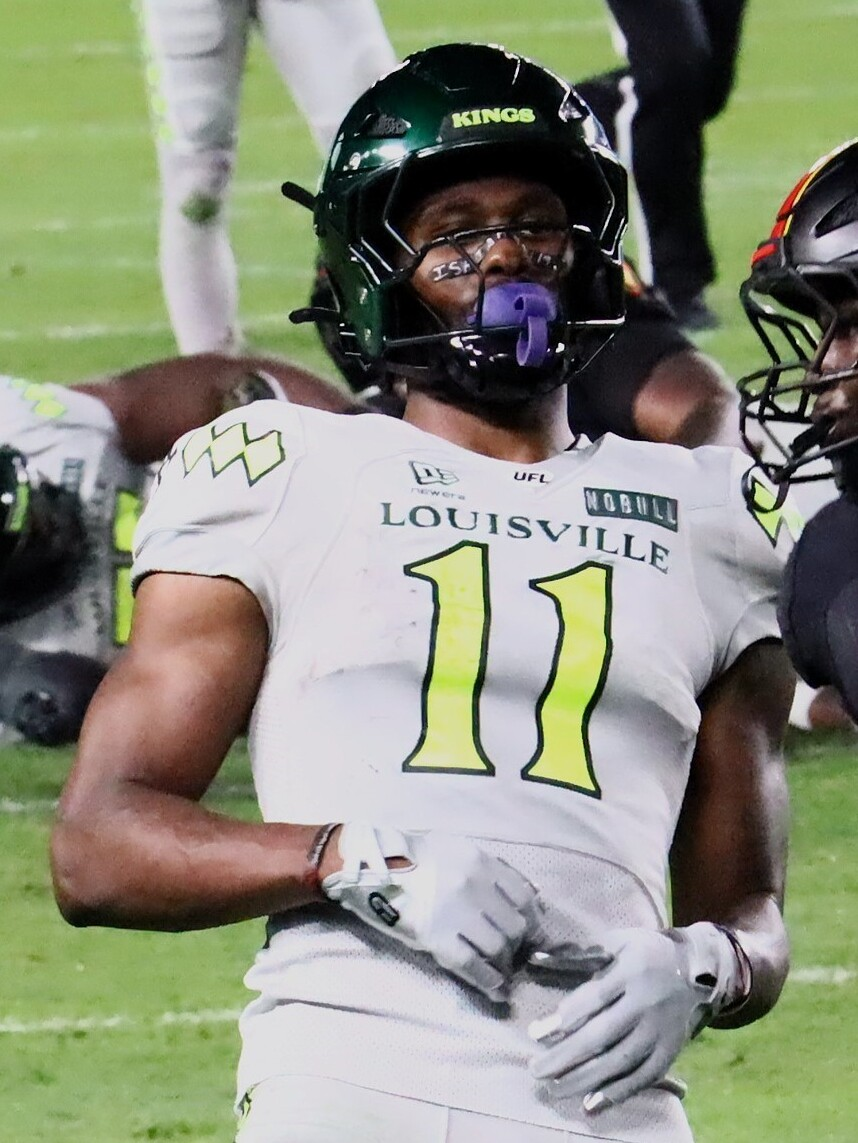
- Winstead with the Louisville Kings in 2026

Profile
- Position: Wide receiver

Personal information
- Born: August 9, 1999 (age 27); Richmond, Virginia, U.S.
- Listed height: 6 ft 3 in (1.91 m)
- Listed weight: 216 lb (98 kg)

Career information
- High school: Highland Springs (Henrico County, VA)
- College: Norfolk State (2017–2018); Toledo (2020–2021); East Carolina (2022)
- NFL draft: 2023: undrafted

Career history
- San Francisco 49ers (2023)*; Arlington Renegades (2024); New York Jets (2024)*; Arlington Renegades (2025); BC Lions (2025)*; Louisville Kings (2026); Pittsburgh Steelers (2026)*
- * Offseason or practice squad member only

Awards and highlights
- UFL champion (2026)
- Stats at Pro Football Reference

Isaiah Winstead (born August 9, 1999) is an American professional football wide receiver. He played college football at Norfolk State, Toledo and East Carolina. He signed with the San Francisco 49ers after going undrafted in the 2023 NFL draft.

== College career ==
=== Norfolk State ===
In his Freshman season, Winstead saw playing time in all 11 games and started two. He caught at least one pass in every game and scored his first collegiate touchdown against North Carolina Central. Winstead finished his freshman season with 29 catches, 344 yards and three touchdowns.

As a sophomore in 2018, he started 10 of 11 games and lead the Spartans in all receiving categories. He was second in the MEAC in reception per game and fourth in receiving yards. Winstead had a career day against MEAC rival Morgan State, hauling in eight passes for a career high 156 yards and a pair of touchdowns that both came in the fourth quarter. Caught a career high nine passes in the final game of the season against Liberty.

=== Toledo ===
Winstead transferred to Toledo after the 2018 season. After sitting out a season because of transfer rules, Winstead made third-team All-MAC after leading the Rockets with 25 receptions and 429 yards. He finished eighth in the MAC in receiving yards and ninth in yards per catch (17.2). Caught his first FBS touchdown against Ball State.

During his second year in Toledo, Winstead finished second on team with 38 receptions for 520 yards. Isaiah hauled in a season-high six receptions for 65 yards against Eastern Michigan. He had four catches vs. Notre Dame, UMass and Central Michigan. Isaiah had a season-high 108 yards receiving in that Central Michigan game. He also had three catches for 49 yards and a touchdown against Akron.

=== East Carolina ===
Winstead arrived at East Carolina as a graduate transfer in 2022 and earned All-AAC Honorable Mention honors as well as Third-Team All-AAC by Phil Steele Magazine. He led the Pirates in receptions and yards as well as second in touchdowns. Winstead became the seventh 1,000 yard receiver in program history against Temple. He went for over 150 yards for the second time in his career against Memphis, which was one of his three 100-yard games during the 2022 season. Winstead finished the season with 88 receptions for 1,085 yards and six touchdowns - all career highs.

=== Statistics ===
Season	Team	Games		Receiving			
Season	Team	GP	GS	Rec	Yds	Avg	TD
2017	Norfolk State	11	2	29	344	11.9	3
2018	Norfolk State	11	10	54	633	11.7	5
2020	Toledo	6	5	25	429	17.2	3
2021	Toledo	13	6	38	520	13.7	1
2022	East Carolina	13	13	88	1,085	12.3	6
Career		54	36	234	3,011	12.9	18

== Professional career ==
Pre-draft measurables
Height	Weight	Arm length	Hand span	Wingspan	40-yard dash	10-yard split	20-yard split	20-yard shuttle	Three-cone drill	Vertical jump	Broad jump	Bench press
6 ft 3 1/8 in (1.91 m)	210 lb (95 kg)	33 5/8 in (0.85 m)	10 3/8 in (0.26 m)	6 ft 8 3/8 in (2.04 m)	4.77 s	1.64 s	2.71 s	4.44 s	7.13 s	30.0 in (0.76 m)	9 ft 10 in (3.00 m)	20 reps
All values from Pro Day

=== San Francisco 49ers ===
After a post on his Twitter went viral, it caught the attention of the San Francisco 49ers who signed him as the final player on their 90-man roster on May 7, 2023. He was waived on August 29, and re-signed to the practice squad. He was released on December 7.

=== Arlington Renegades (first stint) ===
On January 19, 2024, Winstead signed with the Arlington Renegades of the United Football League (UFL). His contract was terminated on August 1.

=== New York Jets ===
Winstead signed with the New York Jets on August 2, 2024. He was waived by the Jets on August 27.

=== Arlington Renegades (second stint) ===
On October 1, 2024, Winstead re-signed with the Arlington Renegades.

=== BC Lions ===
On September 23, 2025, Winstead left the Renegades to sign with the BC Lions of the Canadian Football League (CFL), joining their practice squad, where he spent the remainder of the 2025 CFL season until he was released on November 9.

=== Louisville Kings ===
On January 13, 2026, Winstead was drafted by the Louisville Kings of the United Football League (UFL). He appeared in eight regular season games, recording 29 receptions for 474 yards and three touchdowns. In two postseason games, Winstead had seven receptions for 88 yards and one touchdown as the Kings won the UFL Championship.

=== Pittsburgh Steelers ===
On August 10, 2026, Winstead signed with the Pittsburgh Steelers. On August 28, he was waived by the Steelers.
