= Louisville Kings =

UFL (2024) team based in Louisville, Kentucky

- Current season
Logo	Wordmark
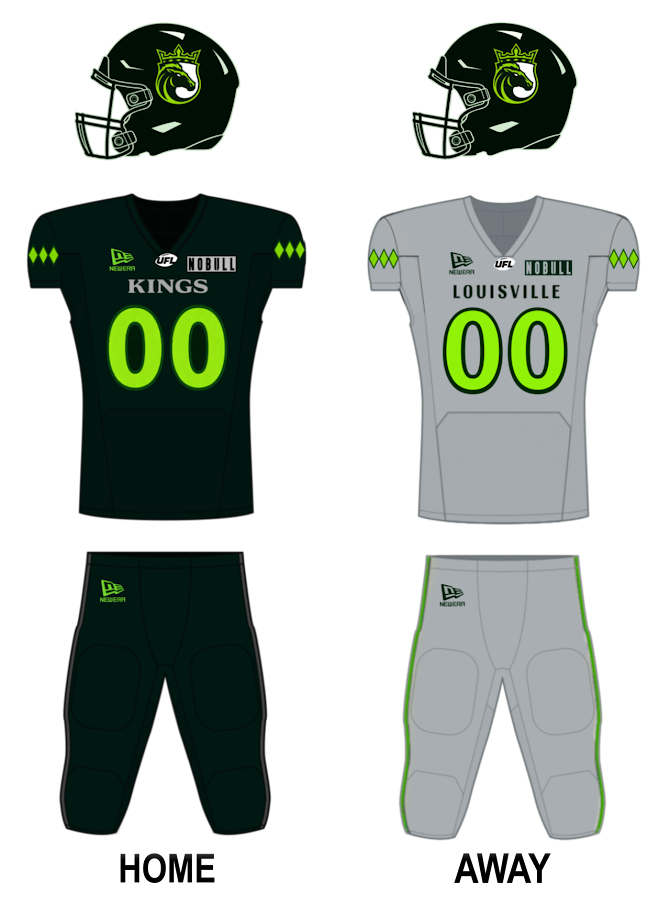
- Uniforms

General information
- Founded: October 7, 2025; 13 months ago
- Stadium: Lynn Family Stadium; Louisville, Kentucky
- Colors: Dark green, lime green, white
- Mascot: Derby
- Website: theufl.com/teams/louisville

Personnel
- Owner: League owned
- Head coach: Chris Redman

Team history
- Louisville Kings (2026–present)

Home fields
- Lynn Family Stadium (2026–present)

League / conference affiliations
- United Football League (2026–present)

Championships
- League championships: 1: UFL championships: 2026

Playoff appearances (1)
- UFL: 2026

The Louisville Kings are a professional American football team based in Louisville, Kentucky. The Kings compete in the United Football League (UFL). The team was founded in 2026, and is currently owned and operated by a consortium led by Mike Repole. The Kings play their home games at Lynn Family Stadium, in Louisville, Kentucky.

== History ==
The Kings were established October 7, 2025. Its name and mascot comes from Kentucky's thoroughbred racing history; co-owner Mike Repole had a 20-year history operating a horse racing stable in the state and racing horses in the Kentucky Derby. Noting that most of the other horse-related mascots such as "Stallions" and "Colts" were already taken, Repole drew inspiration from horse racing's reputation as a "sport of kings." He also considered the possibility of approaching the Louisville Slugger baseball bat company about licensing the name Louisville Sluggers, but decided against it. Louisville mayor Craig Greenberg noted the name's appropriate fit, given the city being named after Louis XVI, the French monarch.

Lynn Family Stadium is the smallest stadium in the UFL, with most others having a capacity of at least 20,000 spectators. Repole had specifically sought out the stadium for a more intimate atmosphere and remarked that if he had been required to use L&N Federal Credit Union Stadium, the much larger football stadium in the city, he would have not brought a team there.

Former Louisville Cardinals offensive lineman Eric Wood, who spent nine seasons with the Buffalo Bills and currently serves as the Bills' current radio color analyst, was named the Kings' first community ambassador.

== Market overview ==
The Kings are the only professional football team in not only Louisville, but in all of Kentucky and the first professional outdoor team in Louisville since the Kentucky Trackers of the American Football Association in 1980. Louisville is home to three major and minor league professional sports teams, the Louisville Bats of the International League, Louisville City FC in USL Championship, and Racing Louisville FC of the National Women's Soccer League.

The market is also heavily influenced by the collegiate teams from the University of Louisville and, to a lesser extent, the University of Kentucky.

The Kings have had the strongest demand for ticket sales of the three newly relocated teams for the 2026 season. Within a month of the announcement, a supporters group, the Kings' Court, had been established and was seeking official recognition.

== Current roster ==
=== Players ===
Louisville Kings roster
Quarterbacks (QB): 5 Mike DiLiello; 13 N'Kosi Perry; 4 Chandler Rogers; Running backs (RB): 21 Jalen Jackson; 30 James Robinson; 20 Jaden Shirden; Wide receivers (WR): 9 Jonathan Adams; 14 Carter Bell; 82 Tyler Hudson; Tight ends (TE): 84 Zach Davidson; 89 Chris Pierce Jr.; 85 Jalen Wydermyer	Offensive linemen (OL): 72 Juwann Bushell-Beatty T; 68 John Campbell Jr. T; 65 J. D. DiRenzo G; 78 Chim Okorafor T; 75 Jaylon Thomas T; 71 James Tunstall T; 63 Dohnovan West G; Defensive linemen (DL): 91 Josiah Bronson DT; 99 Xavier Carlton DE; 96 DeVere Levelston DT; 97 LaRon Stokes DL	Linebackers (LB): 22 Jaylon Allen OLB; 42 Steele Chambers LB; 36 Nick Kubitz MLB; 47 Lonnie Phelps OLB; Defensive backs (DB): 24 DeAgo Brumfield CB; 3 Cameron Dantzler CB; 2 Keaton Ellis FS; 7 Eric Garror CB; 23 Teldrick Ross CB; -- Kary Vincent Jr. CB; 25 Rayshad Williams S; Special teams (ST): 19 Mac Brown P; 48 Jordan Silver LS	36 active As of November 12, 2026. Rookies in italics.: Roster

=== Staff ===
Louisville Kings staff
Head coach: Head coach – Chris Redman; Offensive coaches: Offensive coordinator – Steve Logan; Wide receivers – Tony Banks; Tight ends – Jeff Jagodzinski; Offensive line – Charlie Eger	Defensive coaches: Defensive coordinator – Jamie Sharper; Linebackers – Brad Jackson; Defensive backs – Chris McAlister

== Player history ==
=== Current NFL players ===
Season	Pos	Name	NFL Team
2026	WR	Lucky Jackson	Detroit Lions
2026	CB	Deantre Prince	Chicago Bears
2026	CB	Bryce Hall	Houston Texans

=== Notable players ===
Season	Pos	Name	Notes
2026–present	CB	Cameron Dantzler	Former Minnesota Vikings Cornerback, 2020 3rd Round Pick
2026	WR	Lynn Bowden	Former New Orleans Saints wide receiver, 2020 3rd-round pick
2026	RB	Benny Snell	Former Pittsburgh Steelers running back, 2019 4th-round pick
2026–present	RB	James Robinson	Former Jacksonville Jaguars running back

=== Defensive Player of the Year award winners ===
Kings UFL DPOY winners
Year	Player	Position	Selector
2026	Cam Gill	LB	UFL

=== Special Teams Player of the Year award winners ===
Kings UFL STPOY winners
Year	Player	Position	Selector
2026	Tanner Brown	K	UFL

== Coach history ==
=== Head coaches ===
#	Coach	Term	Regular season				Playoffs			Awards
#	Coach	Term	GC	W	L	Win %	GC	W	L	Awards
Louisville Kings
1	Chris Redman	2026–present	10	6	4	.600	2	2	0	

=== Offensive coordinators ===
#	Coach	Term	Regular season				Playoffs			Awards
#	Coach	Term	GC	W	L	Win %	GC	W	L	Awards
Louisville Kings
1	Steve Logan	2026–present	10	6	4	.600	2	2	0	

=== Defensive coordinators ===
#	Coach	Term	Regular season				Playoffs			Awards
#	Coach	Term	GC	W	L	Win %	GC	W	L	Awards
Louisville Kings
1	Jamie Sharper	2026–present	10	6	4	.600	2	2	0	

== Season by season record ==
UFL champions^{†} (2024–present)	Conference champions^{*}	Division champions^{^}	Wild Card berth^{#}

Season	Team	League	Conference	Division	Regular season			Postseason results	Awards	Head coaches	Pct.
Season	Team	League	Conference	Division	Finish	W	L	Postseason results	Awards	Head coaches	Pct.
2026	2026	UFL^{†}	—N/a	—N/a	3rd^{#}	6	4	Won Semifinals (at Battlehawks) 29–20; Won United Bowl (vs. Defenders) 27–20	Cam Gill (DPOY); Tanner Brown (STPOY); Ian Wheeler (UBMVP)	Chris Redman	.667
Total						6	4	All-time regular season record (2026–)			.600
Total						2	0	All-time postseason record (2026–)			1.000
Total						8	4	All-time regular season and postseason record (2026–)			.667
Total						1 UFL Championship					

=== Franchise matchup history ===
As of 2026 UFL season

Team	Record	Pct.
Birmingham Stallions	0–1	.000
Columbus Aviators	1–0	1.000
Dallas Renegades	2–0	1.000
DC Defenders	3–0	1.000
Houston Gamblers	1–0	1.000
Orlando Storm	0–2	.000
St. Louis Battlehawks	1–1	.500

== Records ==
All-time Kings leaders
Leader	Player	Record	Years with Kings
Passing yards	Chandler Rogers	1,119 passing yards	2026–present
Passing touchdowns	Chandler Rogers	5 passing touchdowns	2026–present
Rushing yards	Ian Wheeler	370 rushing yards	2026–present
Rushing touchdowns	Ian Wheeler	6 rushing touchdowns	2026–present
Receiving yards	Isaiah Winstead	474 receiving yards	2026–present
Receiving touchdowns	Isaiah Winstead	3 receiving touchdowns	2026–present
Receptions	Lucky Jackson	32 receptions	2026–present
Tackles	Jaheim Thomas	64 tackles	2026–present
Sacks	Cam Gill	10 sacks	2026–present
Interceptions	Corey Mayfield Jr	4 interceptions	2026–present
Coaching wins	Chris Redman	6 wins	2026–present
