= Jaylon Thomas =

American football player (born 2000)

Louisville Kings
- Position: Offensive tackle
- Roster status: Active

Personal information
- Born: March 31, 2000 (age 26); Lubbock, Texas, U.S.
- Listed height: 6 ft 3 in (1.91 m)
- Listed weight: 311 lb (141 kg)

Career information
- High school: Coronado (Lubbock)
- College: SMU (2018–2022)
- NFL draft: 2023: undrafted

Career history
- Baltimore Ravens (2023)*; New York Giants (2023); Houston Texans (2023–2025)*; Louisville Kings (2026–present)
- * Offseason or practice squad member only

Awards and highlights
- UFL champion (2026); 2× second-team All-AAC (2019, 2020)
- Stats at Pro Football Reference

Jaylon Thomas (born March 31, 2000) is an American professional football offensive tackle for the Louisville Kings of the United Football League (UFL). He played college football for the SMU Mustangs. He was signed as an undrafted free agent to the Baltimore Ravens following the 2023 NFL draft.

== Early life ==
Thomas grew up in Lubbock, Texas and attended Coronado High School where he lettered in football and basketball. He was rated a three-star recruit and committed to play college football at SMU over offers from Texas Tech, Stephen F. Austin and Tulsa.

== College career ==
During Thomas's true freshman season in 2018, he played in seven games and started six of them at right tackle. During the 2019 season, he played in and started all 13 games at left tackle. He finished the season with a tackle and a solo tackle and he was named in the All-AAC second team and the Phil Steele Preseason AAC for the third-team offense. During the 2020 season, he played in and started all nine games at left tackle. By the end of the season, he was named in the All-AAC second team, the Dave Campbell's All-Texas College Second Team, the Outland Trophy Watch List. During the 2021 season, he played in all 12 games and started nine of them. By the end of the season, he was named on the Outland Trophy Watch List, an East-West Shrine Bowl Invite, the Reese's Senior Bowl Watchlist, the NFLPA Collegiate Bowl Big Board and the College Gridiron Showcase Watchlist. During the 2022 season, he played in 12 games and started 11 of them in all five offensive line positions. By the end of the season he was named an All-AAC Honorable Mention, the Senior Bowl Watchlist, the PFF All-AAC First Team and the Phil Steele All-AAC Fourth Team.

== Professional career ==
Pre-draft measurables
Height	Weight	Arm length	Hand span	Wingspan	40-yard dash	10-yard split	20-yard split	20-yard shuttle	Three-cone drill	Vertical jump	Broad jump
6 ft 3 1/4 in (1.91 m)	304 lb (138 kg)	31 7/8 in (0.81 m)	10 in (0.25 m)	6 ft 5 5/8 in (1.97 m)	4.95 s	1.71 s	2.82 s	4.89 s	7.99 s	31 in (0.79 m)	9 ft 0 in (2.74 m)
All values from Pro Day

=== Baltimore Ravens ===
On May 18, 2023, Thomas was signed to the Baltimore Ravens as an undrafted free agent after going unselected in the 2023 NFL draft. He was waived on August 29 as part of final roster cuts.

=== New York Giants ===
On August 31, 2023, Thomas was signed to the New York Giants practice squad. On September 21, he was elevated from the practice squad to fill in for injured teammates Andrew Thomas and Ben Bredeson. In Week 5, he played three snaps as center. Thomas was released from the Giants on October 31.

=== Houston Texans ===
On November 14, 2023, Thomas was signed to the Houston Texans' practice squad. He signed a reserve/future contract with Houston on January 22, 2024. Thomas was waived with an injury designation on August 3. He reverted to the team's injured reserve list after going unclaimed.

On August 26, 2025, Thomas was waived by the Texans as part of final roster cuts, and was re-signed to the practice squad the following day. Thomas was released by the Texans on September 3 and re-signed to the practice squad one week later. He was released on September 16. On December 3, Thomas was re-signed to the practice squad. He was released on January 14, 2026.

=== Louisville Kings ===
On April 2, 2026, Thomas signed with the Louisville Kings of the United Football League (UFL).
