= DeVere Levelston =

American football player (born 2001)

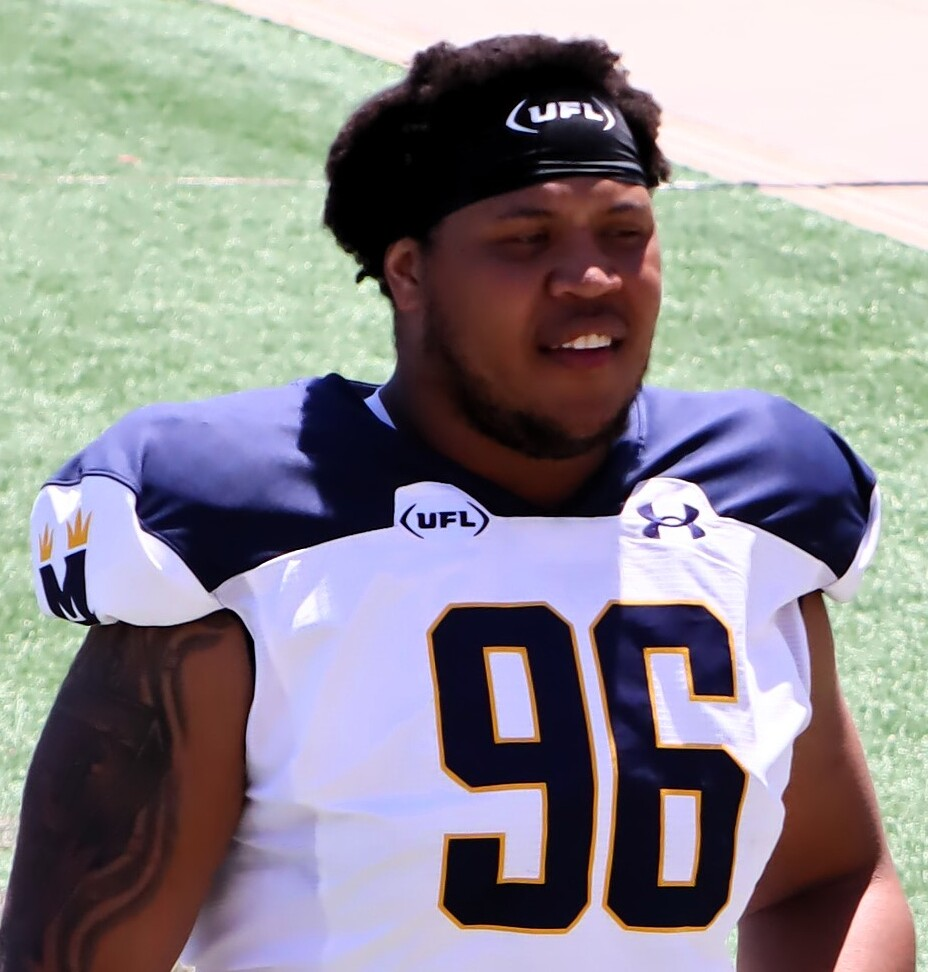
- Levelston with the Memphis Showboats in 2025

No. 96 – Louisville Kings
- Position: Defensive end
- Roster status: Active

Personal information
- Born: April 5, 2001 (age 25); DeSoto, Texas, U.S.
- Listed height: 6 ft 3 in (1.91 m)
- Listed weight: 281 lb (127 kg)

Career information
- High school: DeSoto (DeSoto, Texas)
- College: Tyler JC (2019); SMU (2020–2023)
- NFL draft: 2024: undrafted

Career history
- Seattle Seahawks (2024)*; Memphis Showboats (2025); Louisville Kings (2026–present)
- * Offseason or practice squad member only

Awards and highlights
- UFL champion (2026)
- Stats at Pro Football Reference

DeVere Levelston (born April 5, 2001) is an American professional football defensive end for the Louisville Kings of the United Football League (UFL). He played college football at SMU and was signed by the Seattle Seahawks as an undrafted free agent in 2024.

== College career ==
Levelston graduated from DeSoto High School in DeSoto, Texas. He played college football at Tyler JC in 2019 and would later transfer to SMU, where he played from 2020 to 2023. He played 46 games, where he had a total of 90 tackles, 11 sacks for 66 yards, one fumble recovery, and two blocks.

== Professional career ==
Pre-draft measurables
Height	Weight	Arm length	Hand span	Wingspan	40-yard dash	10-yard split	20-yard split	20-yard shuttle	Three-cone drill	Vertical jump	Broad jump	Bench press
6 ft 3 1/2 in (1.92 m)	281 lb (127 kg)	33 in (0.84 m)	9 7/8 in (0.25 m)	6 ft 6 5/8 in (2.00 m)	5.09 s	1.83 s	2.95 s	4.84 s	7.57 s	28.0 in (0.71 m)	9 ft 5 in (2.87 m)	23 reps
All values from Pro Day

=== Seattle Seahawks ===
After going undrafted in the 2024 NFL draft, on May 3, 2024, Levelston signed a three-year, $2.833 million contract with the Seattle Seahawks. He was waived on August 27, and re-signed to the practice squad. He was released on December 17.

=== Memphis Showboats ===
On April 22, 2025, Levelston signed with the Memphis Showboats of the United Football League.

=== Louisville Kings ===
On January 13, 2026, Levelston was selected by the Louisville Kings in the 2026 UFL Draft.
