= List of Dallas Renegades seasons =

This article is a list of seasons of the Dallas Renegades, an American football franchise of the UFL. The list documents the season-by-season records of the Renegades' franchise from 2020 to present, including postseason records, and league awards for individual players or head coaches. The Renegades franchise was founded in 2018 with the recreation of the league. The team has earned 1 postseason appearance and won the first XFL Championship of the modern era of the league.

== Seasons ==
UFL champions^{†} (2024–present)	XFL champions^{§} (2023)	Conference champions^{*}	Division champions^{^}	Wild Card berth^{#}

Season	Team	League	Conference	Division	Regular season			Postseason results	Awards	Head coaches	Pct.
Season	Team	League	Conference	Division	Finish	W	L	Postseason results	Awards	Head coaches	Pct.
2020	2020	XFL	—N/a	West	2nd	2	3	Season Suspended after 5 games due to COVID-19		Bob Stoops	.400
2021	No Season									Bob Stoops	.400
2022	No Season									Bob Stoops	.400
2023	2023	XFL^{§}	—N/a	South^{^}	2nd^{#}	4	6	Won Division Finals (Roughnecks) 26–11; Won XFL Championship (Defenders) 35–26	Luis Perez (CG MVP)	Bob Stoops	.400
2024	2024	UFL	XFL	—N/a	4th	3	7			Bob Stoops	.400
2025	2025	UFL	XFL	—N/a	3rd	5	5			Bob Stoops	.400
2026	2026	UFL	—N/a	—N/a	T–5th	4	6			Rick Neuheisel	.400
Total						18	27	All-time regular season record (2020–2026)			.400
Total						2	0	All-time postseason record (2020–2026)			1.000
Total						20	27	All-time regular season and postseason record (2020–2026)			.426
Total						1 XFL Championship title					
