= 2023 Arlington Renegades season =

American professional football season

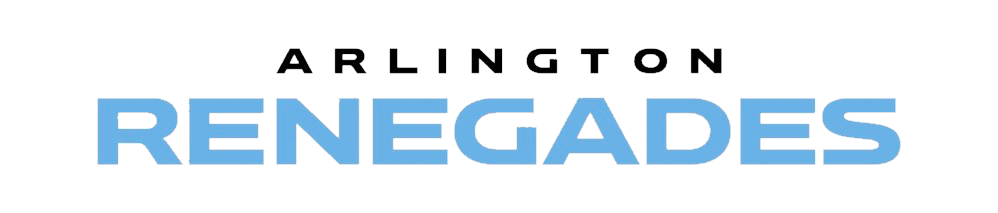
- Owner: Alpha Acquico, LLC
- General manager: Bob Stoops
- Head coach: Bob Stoops
- Home stadium: Choctaw Stadium

Results
- Record: 4–6
- Division place: 2nd XFL South
- Playoffs: Won Division Finals (at Roughnecks) 26–11; Won XFL Championship (vs. Defenders) 35–26

Uniform
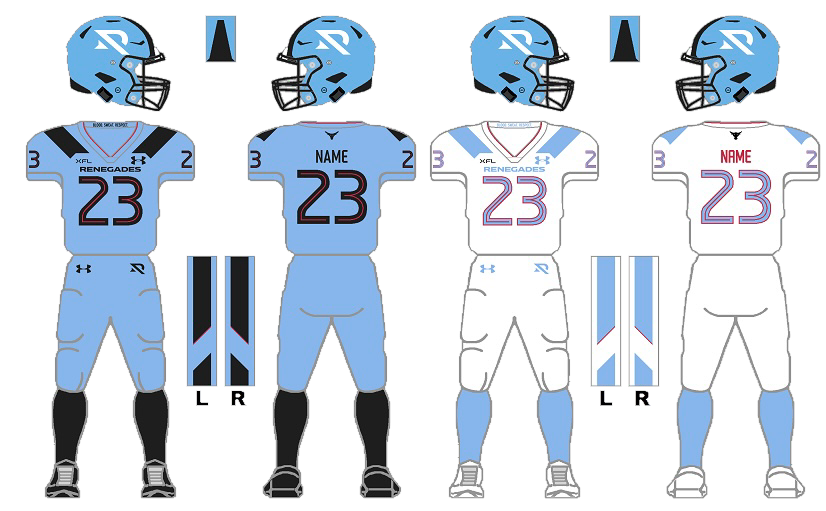

The 2023 Arlington Renegades season was the second season for the Arlington Renegades as a professional American football franchise. They erre charter members of the XFL, and one of eight teams to compete in the league for the 2023 season. The Renegades played their home games at the Choctaw Stadium and were led by head coach Bob Stoops.

The Renegades had changed their franchise name from Dallas Renegades to Arlington Renegades prior to the 2023 season.

Earning their first playoff berth, the Renegades eliminated the South Division regular season division champions Houston Roughnecks. With the win, the Renegades advance to the XFL Championship Game where they faced the DC Defenders, winning by a score of 35–26 to win their first ever XFL Championship.

== Final roster ==
2023 Arlington Renegades final roster
Quarterbacks: 14 Kevin Anderson; 10 Kelly Bryant; 12 Luis Perez; Running backs: 26 Leddie Brown; 35 Brian Herrien; 2 De'Veon Smith; Wide receivers: 19 Brandon Arconado; 8 Victor Bolden Jr.; 16 Rannell Hall; 3 JaVonta Payton; 13 Caleb Vander Esch; 85 Tyler Vaughns; 11 LuJuan Winningham	Offensive linemen: 73 Willie Beavers T; 64 Brian Folkerts C/G; 70 Mike Horton G; 56 Cameron Hunt G/C; 55 Garrett McGhin T; 77 George Moore T; 79 Teton Saltes T; 68 Jake Stetz G; Defensive linemen: 72 T. J. Barnes DE; 71 Josiah Coatney DT; 58 Doug Costin DT; 90 Bruce Hector DE; 6 DaVonte Lambert DE; 48 Tomasi Laulile DE	Linebackers: 45 Will Clarke OLB; 43 Aaron Donkor ILB; 40 Ryan Mueller OLB; 18 Donald Payne ILB; 30 Edmond Robinson OLB; 44 Bunmi Rotimi OLB; 53 Darnell Sankey ILB; 36 Colin Schooler ILB; 50 Willie Taylor III OLB; Defensive backs: 41 De'Vante Bausby CB; 22 Jamal Carter FS; 20 Javaris Davis CB; 24 Darren Evans CB; 5 Will Hill SS; 21 Cre'Von LeBlanc CB; 25 Jordan Miller CB; 4 Joe Powell FS; 27 Brandon Rusnak CB; Special teams: 0 Marquette King P; 49 Antonio Ortiz LS; 1 Taylor Russolino K	Reserve lists: 51 Aaron Adeoye OLB (IR); 42 Otaro Alaka ILB (IR); 29 Shakur Brown CB (IR); 20 Kenneth Farrow RB (IR); 37 Nasir Greer CB (IR); 28 Josh Hawkins CB (IR); 52 Isaiah Graham-Mobley ILB (IR); 9 Drew Plitt QB (IR); 51 active, 8 inactive

== Regular season ==
=== Schedule ===
All times Central

Week	Day	Date	Kickoff	TV	Opponent	Results		Location	Attendance
Week	Day	Date	Kickoff	TV	Opponent	Score	Record	Location	Attendance
1	Saturday	February 18	2:00 p.m.	ABC	Vegas Vipers	W 22–20	1–0	Choctaw Stadium	12,047
2	Sunday	February 26	6:00 p.m.	ESPN2	at Houston Roughnecks	L 14–23	1–1	TDECU Stadium	11,765
3	Sunday	March 5	3:00 p.m.	FX	Orlando Guardians	W 10–9	2–1	Choctaw Stadium	12,006
4	Sunday	March 12	3:00 p.m.	ESPN2	at St. Louis BattleHawks	L 11–24	2–2	The Dome at America's Center	38,310
5	Sunday	March 19	8:00 p.m.	ESPN2	at San Antonio Brahmas	W 12–10	3–2	Alamodome	13,274
6	Sunday	March 26	2:00 p.m.	ABC	San Antonio Brahmas	L 9–15	3–3	Choctaw Stadium	12,368
7	Friday	March 31	6:00 p.m.	FX	Seattle Sea Dragons	L 15–24	3–4	Choctaw Stadium	11,032
8	Saturday	April 8	3:00 p.m.	ESPN	at Orlando Guardians	W 18–16	4–4	Camping World Stadium	7,789
9	Sunday	April 16	11:00 a.m.	ESPN	at DC Defenders	L 26–28 (OT)	4–5	Audi Field	18,684
10	Sunday	April 23	2:00 p.m.	ESPN	Houston Roughnecks	L 9–25	4–6	Choctaw Stadium	12,821

=== Game summaries ===
==== Week 1: vs. Vegas Vipers ====
Week 1: Vegas Vipers at Arlington Renegades – Game summary

Quarter	1	2	3	4	Total
Vipers	6	8	0	6	20
Renegades	3	0	12	7	22

at Choctaw Stadium, Arlington, Texas

- Date: February 18
- Game time: 2:00 p.m. CDT
- Game weather: 51 °F (11 °C)
- Game attendance: 12,047
- Referee: Mike Vandervelde
- TV announcers (ABC): Tom Hart, Greg McElroy, and Cole Cubelic

Game information

First quarter

- VGS – Jeff Badet 5-yard pass from Luis Perez (2-pt Conversion No Good), 8:18. Vipers 6-0. Drive: 12 plays, 69 yards, 6:44.
- ARL – Taylor Russolino 38-yard field goal, 1:29. Vipers 6-3. Drive: 12 plays, 55 yards, 6:47.

Second quarter

- VGS – Jeff Badet 39-yard pass from Luis Perez (2-pt Conversion Good to Brandon Dillon), 4:43. Vipers 14-3. Drive: 5 plays, 65 yards, 2:18.

Third quarter

- ARL – Tomasi Laulile 22-yard interception return (2-pt Conversion No Good), 9:23. Vipers 14-9. Drive: 1 play, 22 yards, 0:04.
- ARL – Taylor Russolino 32-yard field goal, 6:47. Vipers 14-12. Drive: 5 plays, 26 yards, 2:19.
- ARL – Taylor Russolino 25-yard field goal, 2:43. Renegades 15-14. Drive: 5 plays, 28 yards, 2:17.

Fourth quarter

- ARL – De'Vante Bausby 6-yard interception return (1-pt Conversion Good by De'Veon Smith 1-yard rush, 4:06. Renegades 22-14. Drive: 1 play, 1 yard, 0:01.
- VGS – Cinque Sweeting 20-yard pass from Luis Perez (2-pt Conversion No Good), 0:12. Renegades 22-20. Drive: 5 plays, 60 yards, 0:47.

Top passers

- VGS – Luis Perez – 22/36, 249 yards, 3 TD, 2 INT
- ARL – Drew Plitt – 19/25, 172 yards, 1 INT

Top rushers

- VGS – John Lovett – 4 rushes, 10 yards
- ARL – De'Veon Smith – 15 rushes, 42 yards

Top receivers

- VGS – Jeff Badet – 6 receptions, 81 yards, 2 TD
- ARL – Sal Cannella – 7 receptions, 70 yards

==== Week 2: at Houston Roughnecks ====
Week 2: Arlington Renegades at Houston Roughnecks – Game summary

Quarter	1	2	3	4	Total
Renegades	0	14	0	0	14
Roughnecks	11	0	6	6	23

at TDECU Stadium, Houston, Texas

- Date: February 26
- Game time: 6:00 p.m. CDT
- Game weather: 75 °F (24 °C)
- Game attendance: 11,765
- Referee: Jeff Heaser
- TV announcers (ESPN2): Matt Barrie, Joey Galloway, and Tiffany Blackmon

Game information

First quarter

- HOU – Hunter Duplessis 42-yard field goal, 12:10. Roughnecks 3–0. Drive: 6 Plays, 22 Yards, 2:40.
- HOU – Nick Holley 5-yard pass from Brandon Silvers (2-pt Conversion Good by Jontre Kirklin), 7:40. Roughnecks 11–0. Drive: 1 Play, 95 Yards, 0:05.

Second quarter

- ARL – LuJuan Winningham 4-yard pass from Drew Plitt (2-pt Conversion No Good), 9:23. Roughnecks 11–6. Drive: 6 Plays, 23 Yards, 2:59.
- ARL – Nate Becker 13-yard pass from Drew Plitt (2-pt Conversion Good by Tyler Vaughns), 3:53. Renegades 14–11. Drive: 4 Plays, 40 Yards, 1:44.

Third quarter

- HOU – Cedric Byrd 15-yard pass from Brandon Silvers (1-pt Conversion No Good), 7:42. Roughnecks 17–14. Drive: 6 Plays, 45 Yards, 2:55.

Fourth quarter

- HOU – Max Borghi 4-yard rush (1-pt Conversion No Good), 5:00. Roughnecks 23–14. Drive:13 Plays, 70 Yards, 7:44.

Top passers

- ARL – Drew Plitt – 15/29, 120 yards, 2 TD, 1 INT
- HOU – Brandon Silvers – 14/28, 173 yards, 2 TD

Top rushers

- ARL – De'Veon Smith – 7 rushes, 16 yards
- HOU – Cole McDonald – 7 rushes, 39 yards

Top receivers

- ARL – Sal Cannella – 4 receptions, 38 yards
- HOU – Ben Putman – 4 receptions, 65 yards

==== Week 3: vs. Orlando Guardians ====
Week 3: Orlando Guardians at Arlington Renegades – Game summary

Quarter	1	2	3	4	Total
Guardians	3	0	0	6	9
Renegades	3	0	0	7	10

at Choctaw Stadium, Arlington, Texas

- Date: March 5
- Game time: 3:00 p.m. CDT
- Game weather: 77 °F (25 °C)
- Game attendance: 12,006
- Referee: Francisco Villar
- TV announcers (FX): Lowell Galindo, Sam Acho, and Taylor McGregor

Game information

First quarter

- ORL – José Borregales 35-yard field goal, 7:38. Guardians 3–0. Drive: 12 Plays, 48 Yards, 7:22.
- ARL – Taylor Russolino 21-yard field goal, 0:40. Tied 3–3. Drive: 6 Plays, 13 Yards, 2:30.

Second quarter

Third quarter

Fourth quarter

- ORL – Paxton Lynch 3-yard rush (1-pt Conversion No Good), 14:56. Guardians 9–3. Drive: 11 Plays, 73 Yards, 4:58.
- ARL – Tyler Vaughns 17-yard pass from Kyle Sloter (1-pt Conversion Good by De'Veon Smith), 7:58. Renegades 10–9. Drive: 12 Plays, 74 Yards, 21:57.

Top passers

- ORL – Paxton Lynch – 19/31, 219 yards, 0 TD
- ARL – Kyle Sloter – 18/23, 124 yards, 1 TD

Top rushers

- ORL – Paxton Lynch – 10 rushes, 43 yards
- ARL – De'Veon Smith – 18 rushes, 49 yards

Top receivers

- ORL – Cody Latimer – 6 receptions, 66 yards
- ARL – Tyler Vaughns – 5 receptions, 39 yards

==== Week 4: at St. Louis BattleHawks ====
Week 4: Arlington Renegades at St. Louis BattleHawks – Game summary

Quarter	1	2	3	4	Total
Renegades	0	3	0	8	11
BattleHawks	3	8	6	7	24

at The Dome at America's Center, St. Louis, Missouri

- Date: March 12
- Game time: 3:00 p.m. CDT
- Game weather: 44 °F (7 °C)
- Game attendance: 38,310
- Referee: Mike Vandervelde
- TV announcers (ESPN2): Tom Hart, Greg McElroy, and Cole Cubelic

Game information

First quarter

- STL – Donny Hageman 28-yard field goal, 5:46. BattleHawks 3–0. Drive: 10 Plays, 45 Yards, 5:46.

Second quarter

- ARL – Taylor Russolino 37-yard field goal, 4:35. Tied 3–3. Drive: 4 Plays, 4 Yards, 1:42.
- STL – Darrius Shepherd 27-yard pass from A. J. McCarron (2-pt Conversion Good by Brian Hill), 0:11. BattleHawks 11–3. Drive: 8 Plays, 67 Yards, 4:16.

Third quarter

- STL – Brian Hill 15-yard rush (2-pt Conversion No Good), 6:48. BattleHawks 17–3. Drive: 6 Plays, 68 Yards, 3:12.

Fourth quarter

- ARL – De'Veon Smith 1-yard rush (2-pt Conversion Good by De'Veon Smith), 12:40. BattleHawks 17–11. Drive: 9 Plays, 87 Yards, 4:44.
- STL – Hakeem Butler 25-yard pass from A. J. McCarron (1-pt Conversion Good by Jake Sutherland), 9:55. BattleHawks 24–11. Drive: 6 Plays, 67 Yards, 2:45.

Top passers

- ARL – Kyle Sloter – 23/39, 205 yards, 0 TD
- STL – A. J. McCarron – 20/27, 214 yards, 2 TD

Top rushers

- ARL – De'Veon Smith – 9 rushes, 24 yards
- STL – Brian Hill – 18 rushes, 89 yards

Top receivers

- ARL – Sal Cannella – 6 receptions, 40 yards
- STL – Darrius Shepherd – 8 receptions, 91 yards

==== Week 5: at San Antonio Brahmas ====
Week 5: Arlington Renegades at San Antonio Brahmas – Game summary

Quarter	1	2	3	4	Total
Renegades	3	3	6	0	12
Brahmas	7	3	0	0	10

at Alamodome, San Antonio, Texas

- Date: March 19
- Game time: 8:00 p.m. CDT
- Game weather: 55 °F (13 °C)
- Game attendance: 13,274
- Referee: Jeff Heaser
- TV announcers (ESPN2): Tom Hart, Cole Cubelic, and Katie George

Game information

First quarter

- ARL – Taylor Russolino 43-yard field goal, 9:48. Renegades 3–0 Drive: 9 Plays, 45 Yards, 5:12.
- SA – T. J. Vasher 6-yard pass from Reid Sinnett (1-pt Conversion Good by T. J. Vasher), 2:55. Brahmas 7–3. Drive: 7 Plays, 33 Yards, 3:37.

Second quarter

- ARL – Taylor Russolino 25-yard field goal, 10:40. Brahmas 7–6. Drive: 15 Plays, 78 Yards, 7:15.
- SA – Parker Romo 45-yard field goal, 0:04. Brahmas 10–6. Drive: 5 Plays, 34 Yards, 1:00.

Third quarter

- ARL – De'Veon Smith 1-yard rush (2-pt Conversion No Good), 1:12. Renegades 12–10. Drive: 14 Plays, 98 Yards, 8:35.

Fourth quarter

Top passers

- ARL – Kyle Sloter – 14/26, 148 yards, 0 TD
- SA – Reid Sinnett – 13/19, 97 yards, 1 TD

Top rushers

- ARL – De'Veon Smith – 19 rushes, 44 yards
- SA – Jacques Patrick – 6 rushes, 26 yards

Top receivers

- ARL – Sal Cannella – 4 receptions, 32 yards
- SA – Kalen Ballage – 5 receptions, 42 yards

==== Week 6: vs. San Antonio Brahmas ====
Week 6: San Antonio Brahmas at Arlington Renegades – Game summary

Quarter	1	2	3	4	Total
Brahmas	3	6	0	6	15
Renegades	0	0	9	0	9

at Choctaw Stadium, Arlington, Texas

- Date: March 26
- Game time: 2:00 p.m. CDT
- Game weather: 73 °F (23 °C)
- Game attendance: 12,368
- Referee: Chris Coyte
- TV announcers (ABC): Tom Hart, Greg McElroy, and Cole Cubelic

Game information

First quarter

- SA – Parker Romo 28-yard field goal, 1:48. Brahmas 3–0. Drive: 11 Plays, 59 Yards, 7:33.

Second quarter

- SA – Fumble recovery returned for touchdown by Jordan Williams (2-pt Conversion No Good), 6:34. Brahmas 9–0. Drive: 1 Play, 0 Yards, 0:28.

Third quarter

- ARL – Taylor Russolino 53-yard field goal, 12:00. Brahmas 9–3. Drive: 6 Plays, 38 Yards, 3:00.
- ARL – LuJuan Willingham 16-yard pass from Drew Plitt (1-pt Conversion No Good), 8:38. Tied 9–9. Drive: 4 Plays, 33 Yards, 2:04.

Fourth quarter

- SA – Parker Romo 45-yard field goal, 9:02. Brahmas 12–9. Drive: 4 Plays, 48 Yards, 2:02.
- SA – Parker Romo 56–yard field goal, 1:46. Brahmas 15–9. Drive: 7 Plays, 46 Yards, 2:19.

Top passers

- SA – Juwan Pass – 8/14, 57 yards, 0 TD
- ARL – Drew Plitt – 10/16, 163 yards, 1 TD

Top rushers

- SA – Jacques Patrick – 15 rushes, 82 yards
- ARL – Leddie Brown – 11 rushes, 38 yards

Top receivers

- SA – Jacques Patrick – 3 receptions, 18 yards
- ARL – De'Veon Smith – 4 receptions, 49 yards

==== Week 7: vs. Seattle Sea Dragons ====
Week 7: Seattle Sea Dragons at Arlington Renegades – Game summary

Quarter	1	2	3	4	Total
Sea Dragons	3	18	0	3	24
Renegades	3	6	0	6	15

at Choctaw Stadium, Arlington, Texas

- Date: March 31
- Game time: 6:00 p.m. CDT
- Game weather: 81 °F (27 °C)
- Game attendance: 11,032
- Referee: Mike Vandervelde
- TV announcers (FX): Roy Philpott, Joey Galloway, and Tiffany Blackmon

Game information

First quarter

- SEA – Dominik Eberle 44-yard field goal, 9:27. Sea Dragons 3–0. Drive: 9 Plays, 34 Yards, 5:33.
- ARL – Taylor Russolino 36-yard field goal, 1:43. Tied 3–3. Drive: 14 Plays, 56 Yards, 7:44.

Second quarter

- SEA – Dominik Eberle 33-yard field goal, 12:18. Sea Dragons 6–3. Drive: 8 Plays, 60 Yards, 4:25.
- SEA – Darius Bradwell 2-yard rush (1-pt Conversion Good by Darius Bradwell), 5:01. Sea Dragons 13–3. Drive: 3 Plays, 57 Yards, 1:08.
- ARL – De'Veon Smith 1-yard rush (1-pt Conversion No Good), 1:01. Sea Dragons 13–9. Drive: 9 Plays, 72 Yards, 3:59.
- SEA – Josh Gordon 24-yard pass from Ben DiNucci (2-pt Conversion Good by Juwan Green), 0:08. Sea Dragons 21–9. Drive: 6 Plays, 76 Yards, 0:53.

Third quarter

Fourth quarter

- SEA – Dominik Eberle 48-yard field goal, 6:45. Sea Dragons 24–9. Drive: 12 Plays, 49 Yards, 7:00.
- ARL – De'Veon Smith 2-yard rush (2-pt Conversion No Good), 2:17. Sea Dragons 24–15. Drive: 8 Plays, 72 Yards, 4:28.

Top passers

- SEA – Ben DiNucci – 21/32, 266 yards, 1 TD
- ARL – Drew Plitt – 19/29, 213 yards, 0 TD

Top rushers

- SEA – Ben DiNucci – 9 rushes, 52 yards
- ARL – De'Veon Smith – 12 rushes, 61 yards

Top receivers

- SEA – Jahcour Pearson – 5 receptions, 31 yards
- ARL – Sal Cannella – 4 receptions, 64 yards

==== Week 8: at Orlando Guardians ====
Week 8: Arlington Renegades at Orlando Guardians – Game summary

Quarter	1	2	3	4	Total
Renegades	9	3	6	0	18
Guardians	3	6	0	7	16

at Camping World Stadium, Orlando, Florida

- Date: April 8
- Game time: 3:00 p.m. CDT
- Game weather: 86 °F (30 °C)
- Game attendance: 7,789
- Referee: Jeff Heaser
- TV announcers (ESPN): John Schriffen, Tom Luginbill, and Stormy Buonantony

Game information

First quarter

- ARL – Taylor Russolino 23-yard field goal, 7:50. Renegades 3–0. Drive: 13 Plays, 60 Yards, 7:10.
- ORL – José Borregales 24-yard field goal, 4:30. Tied 3–3. Drive: 4 Plays, 2 Yards, 1:30.
- ARL – Fumble recovery returned for touchdown by De'Vante Bausby, 1:05. Renegades 9–3. Drive: 2 Plays, -1 Yards, 0:41.

Second quarter

- ARL – Taylor Russolino 31-yard field goal, 11:23. Renegades 12–3. Drive: 5 Plays, 32 Yards, 2:53.
- ORL – Quinten Dormady 2-yard rush (1-pt Conversion No Good), 0:50. Renegades 12–9. Drive: 8 Plays, 69 Yards, 2:45.

Third quarter

- ARL – De'Veon Smith 1-yard rush (1-pt Conversion No Good), 0:19. Renegades 18–9. Drive: 5 Plays, 22 Yards, 3:04.

Fourth quarter

- ORL – Eli Rogers 19-yard pass from Quinten Dormady (1-pt Conversion Good by Jah-Maine Martin), 3:54. Renegades 18–16. Drive: 6 Plays, 78 Yards, 2:15.

Top passers

- ARL – Luis Perez – 16/25, 190 yards, 0 TD
- ORL – Quinten Dormady – 28/43, 303 yards, 1 TD

Top rushers

- ARL – De'Veon Smith – 13 rushes, 44 yards
- ORL – Devin Darrington – 7 rushes, 5 yards

Top receivers

- ARL – Tyler Vaughns – 4 receptions, 52 yards
- ORL – Eli Rogers – 10 receptions, 135 yards

==== Week 9: at DC Defenders ====
Week 9: Arlington Renegades at DC Defenders – Game summary

Quarter	1	2	3	4	OT	Total
Renegades	3	6	0	17	0	26
Defenders	6	14	6	0	2	28

at Audi Field, Washington, DC

- Date: April 16
- Game time: 11:00 a.m. CDT
- Game weather: 77 °F (25 °C)
- Game attendance: 18,684
- Referee: Francisco Villar
- TV announcers (ESPN): John Schriffen, Tom Luginbill, and Stormy Buonantony

Game information

First quarter

- ARL – Taylor Russolino 23-yard field goal, 9:39. Renegades 3–0 Drive: 9 Plays, 79 Yards, 5:21.
- DC – Josh Hammond 9-yard pass from Jordan Ta'amu (2-pt Conversion No Good), 7:54. Defenders 6–3. Drive: 5 Plays, 71 Yards, 1:45.

Second quarter

- DC – Lucky Jackson 14-yard pass from Jordan Ta'amu (2-pt Conversion No Good), 9:27. Defenders 12–3. Drive: 5 Plays, 70 Yards, 3:08.
- ARL – Caleb Vander Esch 25-yard pass from Luis Perez (2-pt Conversion No Good), 6:26. Defenders 12–9. Drive: 7 Plays, 65 Yards, 3:01.
- DC – Lucky Jackson 6-yard pass from D'Eriq King (2-pt Conversion Good by Jazz Ferguson), 0:46. Defenders 20–9. Drive: 11 Plays, 77 Yards, 5:40.

Third quarter

- DC – Pass interception returned for touchdown by D. J. Swearinger (2-pt Conversion No Good), 9:40. Defenders 26–9. Drive: 6 Plays, 43 Yards, 3:50.

Fourth quarter

- ARL – De'Veon Smith 1-yard rush (2-pt Conversion No Good), 12:49. Defenders 26–15. Drive: 6 Plays, 31 Yards, 3:00.
- ARL – De'Veon Smith 1-yard rush (2-pt Conversion Good by Tyler Vaughns), 1:20. Defenders 26–23. Drive: 9 Plays, 67 Yards, 4:02.
- ARL – Taylor Russolino 27-yard field goal, 0:05. Tied 26–26. Drive: 8 Plays, 66 Yards, 1:15.

Overtime

- DC – Josh Hammond pass from Jordan Ta'amu for 2 points

Top passers

- ARL – Luis Perez – 31/41, 335 yards, 1 TD
- DC – Jordan Ta'amu – 14/20, 188 yards, 2 TD

Top rushers

- ARL – De'Veon Smith – 12 rushes, 43 yards
- DC – Abram Smith – 10 rushes, 27 yards

Top receivers

- ARL – Sal Cannella – 7 receptions, 92 yards
- DC – Josh Hammond – 5 receptions, 74 yards

==== Week 10: vs. Houston Roughnecks ====
Week 10: Arlington Renegades at Houston Roughnecks – Game summary

Quarter	1	2	3	4	Total
Roughnecks	12	0	10	0	22
Renegades	3	6	0	0	9

at Choctaw Stadium, Arlington, Texas

- Date: April 23
- Game time: 2:00 p.m. CDT
- Game weather: 51 °F (11 °C)
- Game attendance: 12,821
- Referee: Jason Autrey
- TV announcers (ESPN): Matt Barrie, Eric Mac Lain, and Tiffany Blackmon

Game information

First quarter

- HOU – Cole McDonald 10-yard rush (2-pt Conversion No Good), 10:11. Roughnecks 6–0. Drive: 9 Plays, 69 Yards, 4:50.
- ARL – Taylor Russolino 56-yard field goal, 6:35. Roughnecks 6–3. Drive: 7 Plays, 33 Yards, 3:35.
- HOU – Jeremy Cox 5-yard rush (1-pt Conversion No Good), 4:30. Roughnecks 12–3. Drive: 4 Plays, 66 Yards, 1:53.

Second quarter

- ARL – Taylor Russolino 36-yard field goal, 9:50. Roughnecks 12–6. Drive: 16 Plays, 65 Yards, 9:40.
- ARL – Taylor Russolino 19-yard field goal, 0:07. Roughnecks 12–9. Drive: 10 Plays, 53 Yards, 3:54.

Third quarter

- HOU – Austin Jones 35-yard field goal, 8:23. Roughnecks 15–9. Drive: 9 Plays, 38 Yards, 5:01.
- HOU – Pass interception returned for touchdown by Tavante Beckett (1-pt Conversion Good by Cole McDonald), 5:33. Roughnecks 22–9. Drive: 5 Plays, 20 Yards, 2:50.

Fourth quarter

- HOU – Austin Jones 38-yard field goal, 1:13. Roughnecks 25–9. Drive: 7 Plays, 41 Yards, 2:43.

Top passers

- HOU – Cole McDonald – 10/11, 120 yards, 0 TD
- ARL – Luis Perez – 22/36, 205 yards, 0 TD

Top rushers

- HOU – Jeremy Cox – 21 rushes, 120 yards
- ARL – Leddie Brown – 14 rushes, 29 yards

Top receivers

- HOU – Tavonn Salter – 4 receptions, 47 yards
- ARL – Brian Herrien – 5 receptions, 47 yards

== Standings ==
2023 XFL standings
North Division
Team	W	L	PCT	GB	TD+/-	TD+	TD-	DIV	PF	PA	DIFF	STK
(y) DC Defenders	9	1	.900	–	-2	33	35	6–0	298	240	58	W3
(x) Seattle Sea Dragons	7	3	.700	2	+10	30	20	3–3	243	177	66	W2
(e) St. Louis Battlehawks	7	3	.700	2	+9	32	23	3–3	249	202	47	W1
(e) Vegas Vipers	2	8	.200	7	0	28	28	0–6	184	252	-68	L3
South Division
Team	W	L	PCT	GB	TD+/-	TD+	TD-	DIV	PF	PA	DIFF	STK
(y) Houston Roughnecks	7	3	.700	–	+4	30	26	6–0	247	182	65	W3
(x) Arlington Renegades	4	6	.400	3	-8	15	23	3–3	146	194	-48	L2
(e) San Antonio Brahmas	3	7	.300	4	-8	16	24	3–3	169	183	-14	L1
(e) Orlando Guardians	1	9	.100	6	-5	32	37	0–6	204	310	-106	L3
(x)–clinched playoff berth; (y)–clinched division; (e)–eliminated from playoff contention

== Postseason ==
=== Schedule ===
Week	Day	Date	Kickoff	TV	Opponent	Results		Location	Attendance
Week	Day	Date	Kickoff	TV	Opponent	Score	Record	Location	Attendance
Division Finals	Saturday	April 29	6:00 p.m.	ESPN	at Houston Roughnecks	26–11	1–0	TDECU Stadium	13,558
XFL Championship	Saturday	May 13	7:00 p.m.	ABC	vs. DC Defenders	35–26	2–0	Alamodome	22,754

=== Game summaries ===
==== XFL South Division Finals: at (1) Houston Roughnecks ====
XFL South Division Finals: (2) Arlington Renegades at (1) Houston Roughnecks – Game summary

Quarter	1	2	3	4	Total
Renegades	6	17	0	3	26
Roughnecks	0	8	3	0	11

at TDECU Stadium• Houston, Texas

- Date: April 29
- Game time: 6:00 p.m. CDT
- Game weather: 69 °F (21 °C)
- Game attendance: 13,568
- Referee: Chris Coyte
- TV announcers (ESPN): Matt Barrie, Joey Galloway, Eric Mac Lain and Tiffany Blackmon

Game information

First quarter

- ARL – JaVonta Payton 14-yard pass from Luis Perez (2-pt Conversion No Good), 9:05. Renegades 6–0. Drive: 10 Plays, 75 Yards, 5:55.

Second quarter

- ARL – JaVonta Payton 59-yard pass from Luis Perez (2-pt Conversion Is Good by JaVonta Payton), 13:41. Renegades 14–0. Drive: 3 Plays, 70 Yards, 16:21.
- HOU – Jeremy Cox 1-yard rush (2-pt Conversion Good by Deontay Burnett), 7:01. Renegades 14–8. Drive: 12 Plays, 61 Yards, 6:38.
- ARL – Brandon Arconado 14-yard pass from Luis Perez (2-pt Conversion No Good), 4:58. Renegades 20–8. Drive: 4 Plays, 45 Yards, 2:04.
- ARL – Taylor Russolino 31-yard field goal, 0:05. Renegades 23–8. Drive: 11 Plays, 74 Yards, 2:22.

Third quarter

- HOU – Austin Jones 32-yard field goal, 5:42. Renegades 23–11. Drive: 5 Plays, 13 Yards, 2:25.

Fourth quarter

- ARL – Taylor Russolino 19-yard field goal, 1:04. Renegades 26–11. Drive: 10 Plays, 57 Yards, 4:12.

Top passers

- ARL – Luis Perez – 19/27, 289 yards, 3 TD
- HOU – Cole McDonald – 9/25, 82 yards, 0 TD

Top rushers

- ARL – De'Veon Smith – 24 rushes, 94 yards
- HOU – Max Borghi – 7 rushes, 48 yards

Top receivers

- ARL – JaVonta Payton – 5 receptions, 121 yards
- HOU – Deontay Burnett – 4 reception, 57 yards

==== XFL Championship Game: vs. DC Defenders ====
XFL Championship Game: (2) Arlington Renegades at (1) DC Defenders – Game summary

Quarter	1	2	3	4	Total
Renegades	14	6	12	3	35
Defenders	0	6	14	6	26

at Alamodome, San Antonio, Texas

- Date: May 13
- Game time: 7:00 p.m. CDT
- Game weather: 76 °F (24 °C)
- Game attendance: 22,754
- Referee: Michael VanderVelde
- TV announcers (ABC): Tom Hart, Greg McElroy, Cole Cubelic and Katie George

Game information

First quarter

- ARL – Sal Cannella 41-yard pass from Luis Perez (2-pt Conversion No Good), 11:00. Renegades 6–0. Drive: 2 Plays, 59 Yards, 4:02.
- ARL – Tyler Vaughns 9-yard pass from Luis Perez (2-pt Conversion Good De'Veon Smith), 0:29. Renegades 14–0. Drive: 16 Plays, 88 Yards, 8:45.

Second quarter

- ARL – Taylor Russolino 29-yard field goal, 4:54. Renegades 17–0. Drive: 13 Plays, 54 Yards, 6:50.
- DC – Abram Smith 2-yard rush (2-pt Conversion No Good), 0:32. Renegades 17–6. Drive: 10 Plays, 45 Yards, 4:22.
- ARL – Taylor Russolino 51-yard field goal, 0:02. Renegades 20–6. Drive: 3 Plays, 12 Yards, 0:30.

Third quarter

- DC – Abram Smith 52-yard rush (2-pt Conversion No Good), 11:42. Renegades 20–12. Drive: 7 Plays, 71 Yards, 3:27.
- ARL – Leddie Brown 7-yard rush (1-pt Conversion No Good), 4:44. Renegades 26–12. Drive: 12 Plays, 71 Yards, 6:49.
- DC – Josh Hammond 72-yard pass from Jordan Ta'amu (2-pt Conversion Good by Abram Smith), 0:06. Renegades 26–20. Drive: 2 Plays, 70 Yards, 0:42.
- ARL – Leddie Brown 30-yard pass from Luis Perez (1-pt Conversion No Good), 0:00. Renegades 32–20. Drive: 1 Play, 30 Yards, 0:06.

Fourth quarter

- ARL – Taylor Russolino 33-yard field goal, 9:56. Renegades 35–20. Drive: 7 Plays, 8 Yards, 3:40.
- DC – Josh Hammond 24-yard pass from Jordan Ta'amu (2-pt Conversion No Good), 1:17. Renegades 35–26. Drive: 7 Plays, 78 Yards, 0:45.

Top passers

- ARL – Luis Perez – 26/36, 288 yards, 3 TD
- DC – Jordan Ta'amu – 16/30, 245 yards, 2 TD

Top rushers

- ARL – De'Veon Smith – 15 rushes, 54 yards
- DC – Abram Smith – 13 rushes, 90 yards

Top receivers

- ARL – Tyler Vaughns – 8 receptions, 83 yards
- DC – Josh Hammond – 6 receptions, 127 yards

== Staff ==
Arlington Renegades staff
Front office: Director of team operations – Matt McMillen; Director of player personnel – Rick Mueller; Head coach: General manager/Head coach – Bob Stoops; Offensive coaches: Co-Offensive Coordinator – Jonathan Hayes; Co-Offensive Coordinator / Quarterbacks – Chuck Long; Running backs – Reggie Davis; Offensive Line / Special Teams – Jonathan Himebauch; Tight Ends/Special Teams – Scott Spurrier	Defensive coaches: Co-Defensive Coordinator – Jay Hayes; Co-Defensive Coordinator – Tim Lewis; Linebackers – Bill Sheridan; Cornerbacks – Marvin Sanders; Quality Control – Michael George; Team operations: Equipment Manager – Blake Kuenzi; Video Manager – Chris Crooks
