= 2026 Dallas Renegades season =

American professional football season

- Owner: Alpha Acquico, LLC
- Head coach: Rick Neuheisel
- Home stadium: Toyota Stadium

Results
- Record: 4–6
- Conference place: 5th in UFL
- Playoffs: Did not qualify

Uniform
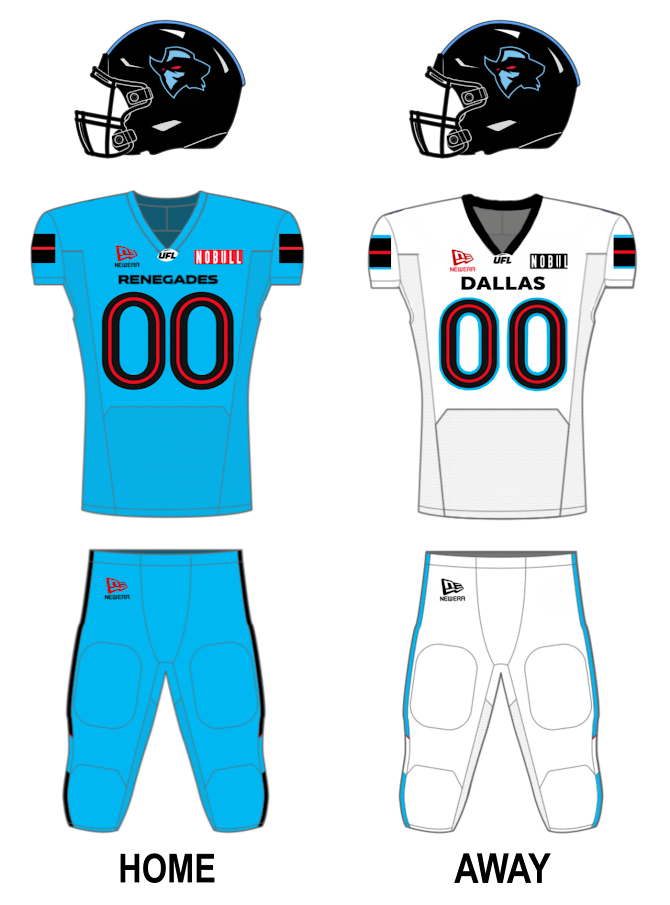

The 2026 Dallas Renegades season was the fifth season for the Dallas Renegades and their third in the UFL. The Renegades failed to improve from their 5–5 record from last season following their Week 8 home loss to the expansion team Orlando Storm, and failed to match it after another loss to another expansion team, the Louisville Kings.

Despite starting the season with a 3–0 record, the Renegades collapsed down the stretch, enduring a 6-game losing streak, which included two blown leads of 10–0 in back-to-back weeks as well as two blowout losses to the aforementioned Kings, the second of which eliminated them from playoff contention for a third straight season.

== Offseason ==
=== Coaching Changes ===
On December 30, 2025, Rick Neuheisel was named as the head coach of the Renegades. On February 23, 2026, the Renegades announced their full 2026 coaching staff.

=== Draft ===
Teams were allowed to protect up to 12 players from their 2025 rosters.

=== Staff ===
Dallas Renegades staff
Head coach: Head coach – Rick Neuheisel; Offensive coaches: Offensive coordinator – Noel Mazzone; Running backs – Chris Reinert; Offensive line – Xavier Suʻa-Filo	Defensive coaches: Defensive coordinator – Mike Gillhamer; Defensive line – Brian Baker; Outside linebackers – Kevin Wolthausen; Inside linebackers – Tim Hundley; Special teams– Scott Spurrier

== Roster ==
2026 Dallas Renegades final roster
Quarterbacks: 10 Luke Lehnen; 16 Austin Reed; Running backs: 20 Keegan Jones; 28 Lorenzo Lingard; 35 Ellis Merriweather; Wide receivers: 17 Emmanuel Butler; 11 Denzel Mims; 13 Drake Stoops; 1 Tyler Vaughns; 84 Greg Ward; Tight ends: 82 Baylor Cupp; 87 Seth Green; 8 Curtis Hodges	Offensive linemen: 75 Alex Akingbulu T; 73 Tremayne Anchrum G; 74 Josiah Ezirim T; 65 Marcus Minor G; 60 Mike Novitsky C; 79 Raiqwon O'Neal T; 66 Corey Stewart T; 78 Keaton Sutherland G; 71 Sam Tecklenburg C/G; Defensive linemen: 4 Tashawn Bower DE; 33 Taco Charlton DE; 69 Domenique Davis DT; 96 T. J. Franklin DE; 63 Siaki Ika DT; 52 Antwuan Jackson DT; 95 DaMarcus Mitchell DE; 92 Darrius Moragne DE; 77 Kevin Strong DT; 90 Tramel Walthour DE	Linebackers: 19 Kalen DeLoach; 9 Matt Jones; 47 Eyabi Okie; 18 Donald Payne; 47 J.T. Tyler; Defensive backs: 3 Qwynnterrio Cole FS; 26 Tra Fluellen SS; 5 Ajene Harris CB; 6 Steven Jones Jr. CB; 25 Armani Marsh CB; 21 Te'Rai Powell FS; 27 Bobby Price SS; 22 Chris Steele CB; 24 Shaun Wade CB; Special teams: 93 Brendan Hall P; 49 Antonio Ortiz LS; 45 Colton Theaker K	Reserve lists: 21 Deontay Burnett WR (IR); -- Chace Davis DT Retired; 51 Andrew Dowell LB (IR); 0 Dae Dae Hunter RB (IR); 50 Willie Taylor III DE (IR); 49 active, 5 inactive

== Schedule ==
All times Central

Week	Day	Date	Kickoff	TV	Opponent	Results		Location	Attendance
Week	Day	Date	Kickoff	TV	Opponent	Score	Record	Location	Attendance
1	Saturday	March 28	3:00 p.m.	Fox	Houston Gamblers	W 36–17	1–0	Toyota Stadium	8,870
2	Tuesday	April 7	7:00 p.m.	FS1	St. Louis Battlehawks	W 31–15	2–0	Toyota Stadium	5,799
3	Sunday	April 12	11:00 a.m.	ABC	Columbus Aviators	W 28–23	3–0	Toyota Stadium	5,133
4	Friday	April 17	7:00 p.m.	Fox	at Columbus Aviators	L 14–28	3–1	Historic Crew Stadium	8,729
5	Sunday	April 26	2:00 p.m.	ABC	Louisville Kings	L 25–47	3–2	Toyota Stadium	7,123
6	Saturday	May 2	11:00 a.m.	ABC	at DC Defenders	L 6–24	3–3	Audi Field	7,019
7	Saturday	May 9	7:00 p.m.	ESPN	at Birmingham Stallions	L 17–21 (OT)	3–4	Protective Stadium	4,705
8	Friday	May 15	7:00 p.m.	Fox	Orlando Storm	L 24–31	3–5	Phantom Warrior Stadium	4,001
9	Sunday	May 24	3:00 p.m.	Fox	at Louisville Kings	L 23–37	3–6	Lynn Family Stadium	10,378
10	Friday	May 29	7:00 p.m.	Fox	at St. Louis Battlehawks	W 20–16	4–6	The Dome at America's Center	24,621

=== Game summaries ===
==== Week 1: vs. Houston Gamblers ====
Week 1: Houston Gamblers at Dallas Renegades – Game summary

Quarter	1	2	3	4	Total
Gamblers	3	0	8	6	17
Renegades	6	17	10	3	36

at Toyota Stadium • Frisco, Texas

- Date: March 28
- Game time: 3:00 p.m. CDT
- Game weather: Overcast, 58 °F (14 °C)
- Game attendance: 8,870
- Referee: Jason Autrey
- TV announcers (Fox): Curt Menefee, Joel Klatt and Jake Butt
- Game Book

Game information

First quarter

- DAL – Steven Jones Jr. 30-yard interception return (two-point run failed), 9:46. Renegades 6–0.
- HOU – John Hoyland 44-yard field goal, 2:07. Renegades 6–3. Drive: 7 plays • 26 yards • 3:15

Second quarter

- DAL – Ellis Merriweather 3-yard pass from Austin Reed (Colton Theaker kick), 11:47. Renegades 13–3. Drive: 10 plays • 60 yards • 5:20
- DAL – Tyler Vaughns 14-yard pass from Austin Reed (Colton Theaker kick), 7:03. Renegades 20–3. Drive: 5 plays • 45 yards • 2:29
- DAL – Colton Theaker 51-yard field goal, 0:03. Renegades 23–3. Drive: 11 plays • 22 yards • 5:03

Third quarter

- DAL – Greg Ward 66-yard pass from Austin Reed (Colton Theaker kick), 14:44. Renegades 30–3. Drive: 1 plays • 66 yards • 0:15
- HOU – Jalen Moreno-Cropper 93-yard kick return (Jalen White two-point run), 14:31. Renegades 30–11.
- DAL – Colton Theaker 26-yard field goal, 8:30. Renegades 33–11. Drive: 11 plays • 72 yards • 6:01

Fourth quarter

- HOU – Hunter Dekkers 3-yard run (two-point pass failed), 7:03. Renegades 33–17. Drive: 9 plays • 77 yards • 3:06
- DAL – Colton Theaker 41-yard field goal, 0:51. Renegades 36–17. Drive: 4 plays • 5 yards • 1:00

Top passers

- HOU – Hunter Dekkers – 19/29, 227 yards
- DAL – Austin Reed – 26/40, 376 yards, 3 TD

Top rushers

- HOU – Hunter Dekkers – 3 rushes, 28 yards, TD
- DAL – Lorenzo Lingard – 8 rushes, 36 yards

Top receivers

- HOU – Jalen Moreno-Cropper – 5 receptions, 59 yards
- DAL – Tyler Vaughns – 7 receptions, 144 yards, TD

==== Week 2: vs. St. Louis Battlehawks ====
Week 2: St. Louis Battlehawks at Dallas Renegades – Game summary

Quarter	1	2	3	4	Total
Battlehawks	3	0	3	9	15
Renegades	9	8	0	14	31

at Toyota Stadium • Frisco, Texas

- Date: April 7
- Game time: 7:00 p.m. CDT
- Game weather: Partly cloudy, 72 °F (22 °C)
- Game attendance: 5,799
- Referee: Francisco Villar
- TV announcers (FS1): Kevin Kugler, Devin Gardner and Jenny Taft
- Game Book

Game information

First quarter

- DAL – Tyler Vaughns 7-yard pass from Austin Reed (kick failed), 11:56. Renegades 6–0. Drive: 6 plays • 68 yards • 3:04
- DAL – Colton Theaker 48-yard field goal, 8:28. Renegades 9–0. Drive: 4 plays • 4 yards • 2:11
- STL – Tucker McCann 20-yard field goal, 3:00. Renegades 9–3. Drive: 10 plays • 72 yards • 5:28

Second quarter

- DAL – Greg Ward 12-yard pass from Austin Reed (Austin Reed–Seth Green two-point pass), 6:44. Renegades 17–3. Drive: 5 plays • 71 yards • 2:21

Third quarter

- STL – Tucker McCann 45-yard field goal, 8:18. Renegades 17–6. Drive: 4 plays • 4 yards • 1:58

Fourth quarter

- DAL – Tyler Vaughns 8-yard pass from Austin Reed (Colton Theaker kick), 14:32. Renegades 24–6. Drive: 15 plays • 60 yards • 8:46
- STL – Tyler Neville 10-yard pass from Brandon Silvers (Brandon Silvers–Hakeem Butler three-point pass), 6:44. Renegades 24–15. Drive: 12 plays • 50 yards • 6:34
- DAL – Tyler Vaughns 30-yard pass from Austin Reed (Colton Theaker kick), 7:58. Renegades 31–15. Drive: 4 plays • 38 yards • 1:51

Top passers

- STL – Brandon Silvers – 22/39, 186 yards, TD, 2 INT
- DAL – Austin Reed – 22/36, 240 yards, 4 TD, INT

Top rushers

- STL – Kevon Latulas – 4 rushes, 16 yards
- DAL – Dae Dae Hunter – 10 rushes, 67 yards

Top receivers

- STL – Jarveon Howard, 5 receptions, 28 yards
- DAL – Tyler Vaughns, 11 receptions, 146 yards, 3 TD

==== Week 3: vs. Columbus Aviators ====
Week 3: Columbus Aviators at Dallas Renegades – Game summary

Quarter	1	2	3	4	Total
Aviators	7	3	7	6	23
Renegades	0	14	14	0	28

at Toyota Stadium • Frisco, Texas

- Date: April 12
- Game time: 11:00 a.m. CDT
- Game weather: Partly cloudy, 66 °F (19 °C)
- Game attendance: 5,133
- Referee: James Carter
- TV announcers (ABC): Roy Philpott, Roddy Jones, Cole Cubelic and Max Browne
- Game Book

Game information

First quarter

- CLB – John Lovett 8-yard pass from Jalan McClendon (Ryan Coe kick), 10:25. Aviators 7–0. Drive: 8 plays • 40 yards • 4:35

Second quarter

- DAL – Deontay Burnett 2-yard pass from Austin Reed (Colton Theaker kick), 11:30. Tied 7–7. Drive: 7 plays • 65 yards • 3:50
- CLB – Ryan Coe 53-yard field goal, 4:26. Aviators 10–7. Drive: 6 plays • 22 yards • 2:48
- DAL – Ajene Harris 3-yard interception return (Colton Theaker kick), 1:22. Renegades 14–10. Drive: 2 plays • 2 yards • 0:34

Third quarter

- DAL – Dae Dae Hunter 1-yard run (Colton Theaker kick), 5:52. Renegades 21–10. Drive: 14 plays • 79 yards • 9:08
- DAL – Emmanuel Butler 2-yard pass from Austin Reed (Colton Theaker kick), 2:43. Renegades 28–10. Drive: 2 plays • 9 yards • 1:32
- CLB – John Lovett 2-yard run (Ryan Coe kick), 0:23. Renegades 28–17. Drive: 6 plays • 60 yards • 2:17

Fourth quarter

- CLB – Antwane Wells Jr. 2-yard pass from Jalan McClendon (two-point pass failed), 1:58. Renegades 28–23. Drive: 11 plays • 75 yards • 5:38

Top passers

- CLB – Jalan McClendon – 26/34, 230 yards, 2 TD, 2 INT
- DAL – Austin Reed – 18/30, 147 yards, 2 TD

Top rushers

- CLB – John Lovett – 6 rushes, 24 yards, TD
- DAL – Dae Dae Hunter – 11 rushes, 62 yards, TD

Top receivers

- CLB – Tay Martin – 5 receptions, 49 yards
- DAL – Tyler Vaughns – 5 receptions, 41 yards

==== Week 4: at Columbus Aviators ====
Week 4: Dallas Renegades at Columbus Aviators – Game summary

Quarter	1	2	3	4	Total
Renegades	7	7	0	0	14
Aviators	0	14	7	7	28

at Historic Crew Stadium • Columbus, Ohio

- Date: April 17
- Game time: 7:00 p.m. CDT
- Game weather: Partly cloudy, 79 °F (26 °C)
- Game attendance: 8,729
- Referee: Kole Knueppel
- TV announcers (Fox): Kevin Kugler, Joel Klatt and Jake Butt
- Game Book

Game information

First quarter

- DAL – Drake Stoops 17-yard pass from Austin Reed (Colton Theaker kick), 11:11. Renegades 7–0. Drive: 7 plays • 68 yards • 3:49

Second quarter

- CLB – ZaQuandre White 1-yard run (Ryan Coe kick), 12:16. Tied 7–7. Drive: 6 plays • 25 yards • 3:02
- DAL – Emmanuel Butler 7-yard pass from Austin Reed (Colton Theaker kick), 7:02. Renegades 14–7. Drive: 10 plays • 80 yards • 5:14
- CLB – Keke Chism 20-yard pass from Jalan McClendon (Ryan Coe kick), 0:50. Tied 14–14. Drive: 12 plays • 70 yards • 6:12

Third quarter

- CLB – Alizé Mack fumble recovery in the end zone (Ryan Coe kick), 10:19. Aviators 21–14.

Fourth quarter

- CLB – Toa Taua 2-yard run (Ryan Coe kick), 6:33. Aviators 28–14. Drive: 18 plays • 97 yards • 9:59

Top passers

- DAL – Austin Reed – 13/27, 144 yards, 2 TD, INT
- CLB – Jalan McClendon – 10/15, 126 yards, TD

Top rushers

- DAL – Dae Dae Hunter – 6 rushes, 45 yards
- CLB – John Lovett – 15 rushes, 80 yards

Top receivers

- DAL – Tyler Vaughns – 5 receptions, 59 yards
- CLB – Keke Chism – 4 receptions, 50 yards

==== Week 5: vs. Louisville Kings ====
Week 5: Louisville Kings at Dallas Renegades – Game summary

Quarter	1	2	3	4	Total
Kings	3	16	7	21	47
Renegades	0	7	6	12	25

at Toyota Stadium, Frisco, Texas

- Date: April 26
- Game time: 2:00 p.m. CDT
- Game weather: Overcast, 81 °F (27 °C)
- Game attendance: 7,123
- Referee: James Carter
- TV announcers (ABC): Joe Tessitore, Jordan Rodgers, Brock Osweiler and Sam Acho
- Game Book

Game information

First quarter

- LOU – Tanner Brown 38-yard field goal, 7:42. Kings 3–0. Drive: 7 plays • 27 yards • 3:47

Second quarter

- LOU – Bryce Hall 83-yard interception return (Tanner Brown kick), 12:23. Kings 10–0.
- LOU – Ian Wheeler 1-yard run (kick failed), 8:23. Kings 16–0. Drive: 8 plays • 40 yards • 3:46
- DAL – Ellis Merriweather 1-yard run (Colton Theaker kick), 1:11. Kings 16–7. Drive: 14 plays • 68 yards • 7:12
- LOU – Tanner Brown 19-yard field goal, 0:04. Kings 19–7. Drive: 7 plays • 59 yards • 1:07

Third quarter

- DAL – Curtis Hodges 25-yard pass from Austin Reed (two-point pass failed), 7:02. Kings 19–13. Drive: 8 plays • 53 yards • 4:27
- LOU – Ian Wheeler 7-yard run (Tanner Brown kick), 2:37. Kings 26–13. Drive: 9 plays • 76 yards • 4:25

Fourth quarter

- LOU – Ian Wheeler 12-yard run (Tanner Brown kick), 12:47. Kings 33–13. Drive: 6 plays • 27 yards • 2:44
- LOU – Antonio Grier 47-yard interception return (Tanner Brown kick), 11:34. Kings 40–13.
- DAL – Ellis Merriweather 1-yard run (three-point pass failed), 7:27. Kings 40–19. Drive: 7 plays • 73 yards • 4:07
- LOU – Ian Wheeler 2-yard run (Tanner Brown kick), 4:43. Kings 47–19. Drive: 5 plays • 28 yards • 2:42
- DAL – Emmanuel Butler 27-yard pass from Greg Ward, 0:00. Kings 47–25. Drive: 11 plays • 80 yards • 4:43

Top passers

- LOU – Chandler Rogers – 13/18, 150 yards
- DAL – Austin Reed – 14/28, 195 yards, TD, 4 INT

Top rushers

- LOU – James Robinson – 13 rushes, 63 yards
- DAL – Ellis Merriweather – 18 rushes, 55 yards, 2 TD

Top receivers

- LOU – Tarik Black – 5 receptions, 59 yards
- DAL – Drake Stoops – 4 receptions, 47 yards

==== Week 6: at DC Defenders ====
Week 6: Dallas Renegades at DC Defenders – Game summary

Quarter	1	2	3	4	Total
Renegades	0	0	6	0	6
Defenders	7	17	0	0	24

at Audi Field • Washington, D.C.

- Date: May 2
- Game time: 11:00 a.m. CDT
- Game weather: Partly cloudy, 56 °F (13 °C)
- Game attendance: 7,019
- Referee: Chris Coyte
- TV announcers (ABC): Roy Philpott, Roddy Jones, Cole Cubelic and Max Browne
- Game Book

Game information

First quarter

- DC – Erik Ezukanma 7-yard pass from Jordan Ta'amu (Matt McCrane kick), 6:18. Defenders 7–0. Drive: 4 plays • 63 yards • 2:34.

Second quarter

- DC – Mason Fairchild 13-yard pass from Jordan Ta'amu (Matt McCrane kick), 10:42. Defenders 14–0. Drive: 12 plays • 58 yards • 7:04
- DC – Cornell Powell 12-yard pass from Jordan Ta'amu (Matt McCrane kick), 9:01. Defenders 21–0. Drive: 13 yards • 18 yards • 1:26
- DC – Matt McCrane 56-yard field goal, 0:41. Defenders 24–0. Drive: 9 yards • 36 yards • 2:30

Third quarter

- DAL – Tyler Vaughns 14-yard pass from Austin Reed (two-point pass failed), 7:48. Defenders 24–6. Drive: 4 plays • 66 yards • 1:55

Fourth quarter

- No scoring plays

Top passers

- DAL – Austin Reed – 258 yards, TD, INT
- DC – Jordan Ta'amu – 227 yards, 3 TD, INT

Top rushers

- DAL – Luke Lehnen – 2 rushes, 23 yards
- DC – Abram Smith – 8 rushes 26 yards

Top receivers

- DAL – Deontay Burnett – 4 receptions, 82 yards
- DC – Briley Moore – 3 receptions, 59 yards

==== Week 7: at Birmingham Stallions ====
Week 7: Dallas Renegades at Birmingham Stallions – Game summary

Quarter	1	2	3	4	OT	Total
Renegades	7	3	0	7	0	17
Stallions	0	7	0	10	4	21

at Protective Stadium • Birmingham, Alabama

- Date: May 9
- Game time: 7:00 p.m. CDT
- Game weather: Partly cloudy, 73 °F (23 °C)
- Game attendance: 4,705
- Referee: Adam Savoie
- TV announcers (ESPN): Joe Tessitore, Jordan Rodgers, Sam Acho and Tom Luginbill
- Game Book

Game information

First quarter

- DAL – Ellis Merriweather 1-yard run (Colton Theaker kick), 3:45. Renegades 7–0. Drive: 15 plays • 55 yards • 8:37

Second quarter

- DAL – Colton Theaker 35-yard field goal, 8:36. Renegades 10–0. Drive: 15 plays • 75 yards • 8:19
- BIR – Daewood Davis 46-yard pass from Dorian Thompson-Robinson (Anders Carlson kick), 3:57. Renegades 10–7. Drive: 8 plays • 71 yards • 4:39

Third quarter

- No scoring plays

Fourth quarter

- BIR – Anders Carlson 40-yard field goal, 8:59. Tied 10–10. Drive: 8 plays • 38 yards • 3:42
- DAL – Ellis Merriweather 15-yard run (Colton Theaker kick), 5:08. Renegades 17–10. Drive: 7 plays • 46 yards • 3:51
- BIR – Jaydon Mickens 18-yard pass from Dorian Thompson-Robinson (Anders Carlson kick), 2:00. Tied 17–17. Drive: 7 plays • 52 yards • 3:08

Overtime

- BIR – Dorian Thompson-Robinson two-point run. Stallions 19–17.
- BIR – Dorian Thompson-Robinson–Jaydon Mickens two-point pass. Stallions 21–17.

Top passers

- DAL – Austin Reed – 25/37, 166 yards
- BIR – Dorian Thompson-Robinson – 12/26, 159 yards, 2 TD, INT

Top rushers

- DAL – Dae Dae Hunter – 11 rushes, 43 yards
- BIR – Tyrion Davis-Price – 12 rushes, 45 yards

Top receivers

- DAL – Ellis Merriweather – 5 receptions, 33 yards
- BIR – Jaydon Mickens – 6 receptions, 82 yards, TD

==== Week 8: vs. Orlando Storm ====
Week 8: Orlando Storm at Dallas Renegades – Game summary

Quarter	1	2	3	4	Total
Storm	0	10	14	7	31
Renegades	3	7	7	7	24

at Phantom Warrior Stadium • Fort Hood, Texas

- Date: May 15
- Game time: 7:00 p.m. CDT
- Game weather: Sunny, 83 °F (28 °C)
- Game attendance: 4,001
- Referee: Chris Coyte
- TV announcers (Fox): Curt Menefee, Joel Klatt, Jenny Taft and Jake Butt
- Game Book

Game information

First quarter

- DAL – Colton Theaker 31-yard field goal, 4:23. Renegades 3–0. Drive: 10 plays • 46 yards • 5:12

Second quarter

- DAL – Emmanuel Butler 3-yard pass from Austin Reed (Colton Theaker kick), 11:06. Renegades 10–0. Drive: 9 plays • 58 yards • 4:43
- ORL – Michael Lantz 43-yard field goal, 6:25. Renegades 10–3. Drive: 8 plays • 40 yards • 4:41
- ORL – Jack Plummer 1-yard run (Michael Lantz kick), 0:14. Tied 10–10. Drive: 10 plays • 50 yards • 4:05

Third quarter

- ORL – Jack Plummer 71-yard run (Michael Lantz kick), 13:27. Storm 17–10. Drive: 3 plays • 80 yards • 1:33
- DAL – Seth Green 36-yard pass from Austin Reed (Colton Theaker kick), 9:50. Tied 17–17. Drive: 6 plays • 62 yards • 3:37
- ORL – Jashaun Corbin 2-yard run (Michael Lantz kick), 3:12. Storm 24–17. Drive: 12 plays • 69 yards • 6:38

Fourth quarter

- ORL – K. J. Hamler 7-yard run (Michael Lantz kick), 10:36. Storm 31–17. Drive: 6 plays • 35 yards • 3:06
- DAL – Emmanuel Butler 9-yard pass from Austin Reed (Colton Theaker kick), 11:06. Storm 31–24. Drive: 10 plays • 70 yards • 5:05

Top passers

- ORL – Jack Plummer – 24/36, 238 yards
- DAL – Austin Reed – 12/23, 134 yards, 3 TD, INT

Top rushers

- ORL – Jack Plummer – 4 rushes, 70 yards, 2 TD
- DAL – Ellis Merriweather – 12 rushes, 76 yards

Top receivers

- ORL – Chris Rowland – 9 receptions, 91 yards
- DAL – Emmanuel Butler – 3 receptions, 21 yards, 2 TD

==== Week 9: at Louisville Kings ====
Week 9: Dallas Renegades at Louisville Kings – Game summary

Quarter	1	2	3	4	Total
Renegades	7	3	0	13	23
Kings	3	10	3	21	37

at Lynn Family Stadium • Louisville, Kentucky

- Date: May 24
- Game time: 3:00 p.m. CDT
- Game weather: Rain and mist, 71 °F (22 °C)
- Game attendance: 10,378
- Referee: James Carter
- TV announcers (Fox): Kevin Kugler, Devin Gardner and Jake Butt
- Game Book

Game information

First quarter

- DAL – Tyler Vaughns 36-yard pass from Austin Reed (Colton Theaker kick), 12:35. Renegades 7–0. Drive: 5 plays, 64 yards, 2:25
- LOU – Tanner Brown 45-yard field goal, :46. Renegades 7–3. Drive: 5 plays • 38 yards • 3:03

Second quarter

- DAL – Colton Theaker 49-yard field goal, 13:33. Renegades 10–3. Drive: 4 plays • –6 yards • 2:13
- LOU – Chandler Rogers 1-yard run (Tanner Brown kick), 5:44. Tied 10–10. Drive: 8 plays • 78 yards • 3:34
- LOU – Tanner Brown 35-yard field goal, :21. Kings 13–10. Drive: 7 plays • 69 yards • 1:35

Third quarter

- LOU – Tanner Brown 54-yard field goal, 10:46. Kings 16–10. Drive: 7 plays • 28 yards • 4:14

Fourth quarter

- DAL – Curtis Hodges 12-yard pass from Austin Reed (Colton Theaker kick), 13:43. Renegades 17–16. Drive: 7 plays • 62 yards • 3:57
- LOU – Isaiah Winstead 40-yard pass from Chandler Rogers (Chandler Rogers–James Robinson two-point pass), 12:13. Kings 24–17. Drive: 3 plays • 60 yards • 1:30
- LOU – Ian Wheeler 1-yard run (two-point pass failed), 7:47. Kings 30–17. Drive: 8 plays • 69 yards • 4:06
- LOU – Tarik Black 22-yard pass from Chandler Rogers (Tanner Brown kick), 3:28. Kings 37–17. Drive: 5 plays • 39 yards • 2:35
- DAL – Lorenzo Lingard 12-yard run (kick failed), 1:30. Kings 37–23. Drive: 5 plays • 63 yards • 1:58

Top passers

- DAL – Austin Reed – 7/21, 101 yards, 2 TD, INT
- LOU – Chandler Rogers – 16/21, 266 yards, 2 TD

Top rushers

- DAL – Lorenzo Lingard – 16 rushes, 56 yards, TD
- LOU – Ian Wheeler – 13 rushes, 93 yards, TD

Top receivers

- DAL – Curtis Hodges – 2 receptions, 39 yards, TD
- LOU – Tarik Black – 4 receptions, 82 yards, TD

==== Week 10: at St. Louis Battlehawks ====
Week 10: Dallas Renegades at St. Louis Battlehawks – Game summary

Quarter	1	2	3	4	Total
Renegades	7	6	0	7	20
Battlehawks	3	3	7	3	16

at The Dome at America's Center • St. Louis, Missouri

- Date: May 29
- Game time: 7:00 p.m. CDT
- Game weather: Sunny, 78 °F (26 °C)
- Game attendance: 24,621
- Referee: Michael Vandervelde
- TV announcers (Fox): Kevin Kugler, Joel Klatt and Jenny Taft
- Game Book

Game information

First quarter

- STL – Ramiz Ahmed 45-yard field goal, 7:46. Battlehawks 3–0. Drive: 9 plays • 34 yards • 5:12
- DAL – Emmanuel Butler 7-yard pass from Austin Reed (Colton Theaker kick), 1:19. Renegades 7–3. Drive: 6 plays • 46 yards • 3:16

Second quarter

- STL – Ramiz Ahmed 32-yard field goal, 12:49. Renegades 7–6. Drive: 7 plays • 60 yards • 3:30
- DAL – Tyler Vaughns 4-yard pass from Austin Reed (kick failed), 1:56. Renegades 13–6. Drive: 7 plays • 55 yards • 3:39

Third quarter

- STL – James Bostic III 10-yard pass from Luis Perez (Ramiz Ahmed kick), 4:25. Tied 13–13. Drive: 9 plays • 69 yards • 5:23

Fourth quarter

- STL – Ramiz Ahmed 32-yard field goal, 10:00. Battlehawks 16–13. Drive: 8 plays • 15 yards • 3:32
- DAL – Emmanuel Butler 7-yard pass from Austin Reed (Colton Theaker kick), 3:32. Renegades 20–16. Drive: 11 plays • 61 yards • 3:28

Top passers

- DAL – Austin Reed – 15/26, 162 yards, 3 TD
- STL – Luis Perez – 18/29, 272 yards, TD, 2 INT

Top rushers

- DAL – Lorenzo Lingard – 15 rushes, 30 yards
- STL – Kylin James – 6 rushes, 40 yards

Top receivers

- DAL – Emmanuel Butler – 3 receptions, 38 yards, 2 TD
- STL – Steven McBride – 4 receptions, 79 yards

== Standings ==
2026 UFL standings
Team	W	L	PCT	GB	TD+/-	TD+	TD-	PF	PA	DIFF	STK
(y) Orlando Storm	8	2	.800	–	9	26	17	232	186	46	W4
(x) St. Louis Battlehawks	6	4	.600	2	-2	21	23	212	197	15	L1
(x) Louisville Kings	6	4	.600	2	1	27	26	265	219	46	W4
(x) DC Defenders	5	5	.500	3	6	31	25	281	224	57	L4
(e) Dallas Renegades	4	6	.400	4	2	30	28	224	259	-35	W1
(e) Birmingham Stallions	4	6	.400	4	-1	24	25	190	229	-39	L2
(e) Houston Gamblers	4	6	.400	4	-6	20	26	189	236	-60	W1
(e) Columbus Aviators	3	7	.300	5	-6	27	33	216	259	-43	L1
(x)–clinched playoff berth; (y)–clinched conference; (e)–eliminated from playoff contention
