= Tyler Vaughns =

American football player (born 1997)

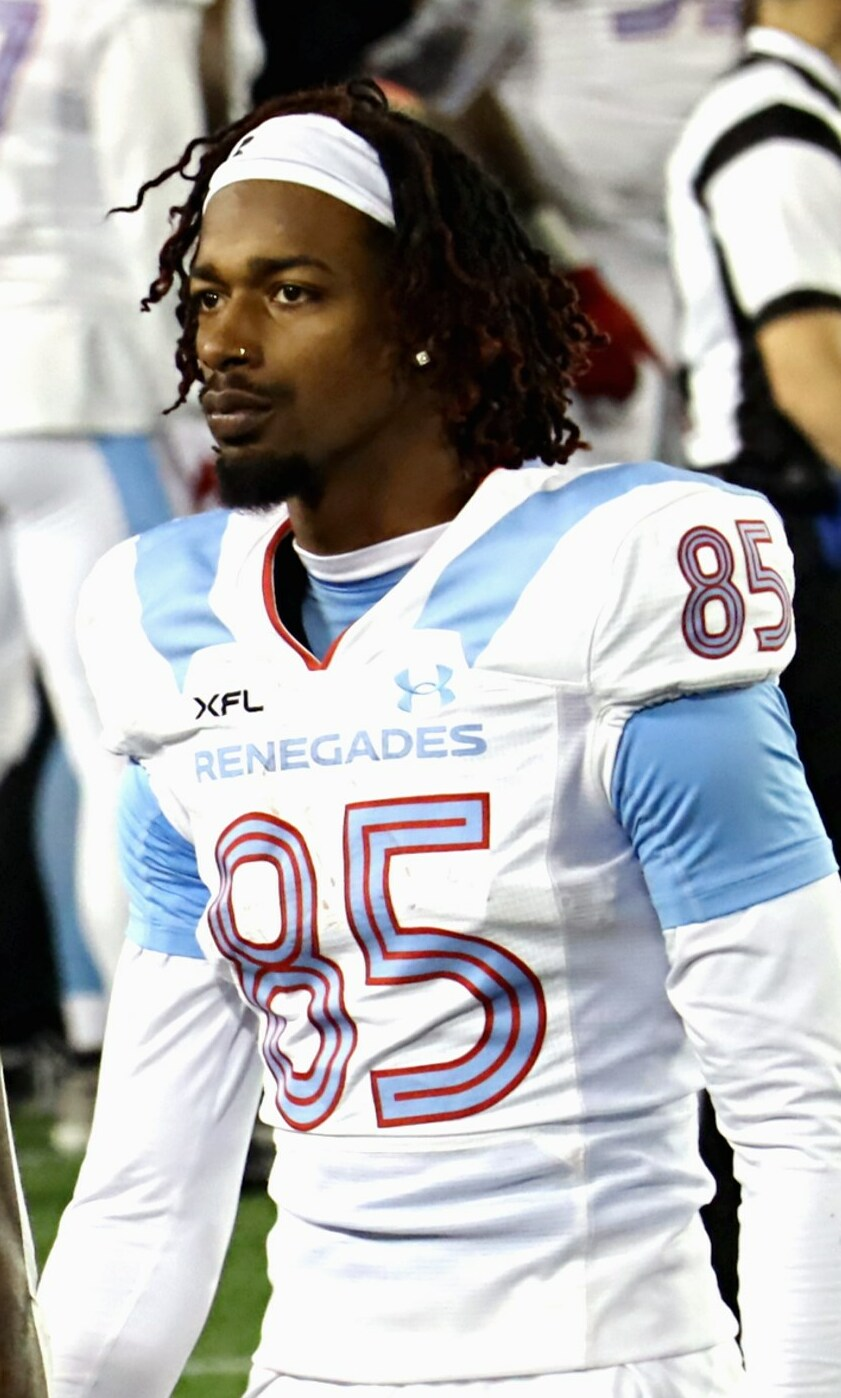
- Vaughns in 2023

No. 1 – Colorado Stampede
- Position: Wide receiver
- Roster status: Active

Personal information
- Born: June 1, 1997 (age 29); Pasadena, California, U.S.
- Listed height: 6 ft 2 in (1.88 m)
- Listed weight: 182 lb (83 kg)

Career information
- High school: Bishop Amat (La Puente, California)
- College: USC
- NFL draft: 2021: undrafted

Career history
- Indianapolis Colts (2021)*; Pittsburgh Steelers (2021–2022)*; Arlington / Dallas Renegades (2023–2026); Colorado Stampede (2027–present)
- * Offseason or practice squad member only

Awards and highlights
- XFL champion (2023); 2x All-UFL Team (2025, 2026); UFL receiving touchdowns leader (2026); Second-team All-Pac-12 (2020)
- Stats at Pro Football Reference

Tyler Vaughns (born June 1, 1997) is an American football wide receiver for the Colorado Stampede of the United Football League (UFL). He played college football at USC and was signed by the Indianapolis Colts as an undrafted free agent in 2021. He has also played for the Arlington / Dallas Renegades.

== Early life ==
Vaughns attended Bishop Amat High School in La Puente, California. He played wide receiver and defensive back on the football team. He also played basketball in high school. A five star recruit, Vaughns committed to the University of Southern California (USC) to play college football.

== College career ==
After redshirting his first year at USC in 2016, Vaughns played in 14 games and made 10 starts in 2017, recording 57 receptions for 809 yards and five touchdowns. As a redshirt sophomore in 2018, he started 11 of 12 games, finishing the season with 58 receptions for 674 yards and six touchdowns. He returned as a starter his redshirt junior year in 2019.

=== Statistics ===
Season	Team	Games		Receiving			
Season	Team	GP	GS	Rec	Yds	Avg	TD
2016	USC	Redshirted (redshirt)					
2017	USC	14	10	57	809	14.2	5
2018	USC	12	11	58	674	11.6	6
2019	USC	13	11	74	912	12.3	6
2020	USC	6	5	33	406	12.3	3
Career		45	37	222	2,801	12.6	20

== Professional career ==
Pre-draft measurables
Height	Weight	Arm length	Hand span	Wingspan	40-yard dash	10-yard split	20-yard split	20-yard shuttle	Three-cone drill	Vertical jump	Broad jump	Bench press
6 ft 2 in (1.88 m)	184 lb (83 kg)	32 7/8 in (0.84 m)	9 1/2 in (0.24 m)	6 ft 7 in (2.01 m)	4.69 s	1.64 s	2.74 s	4.40 s	7.15 s	31.5 in (0.80 m)	10 ft 0 in (3.05 m)	7 reps
All values from Pro Day

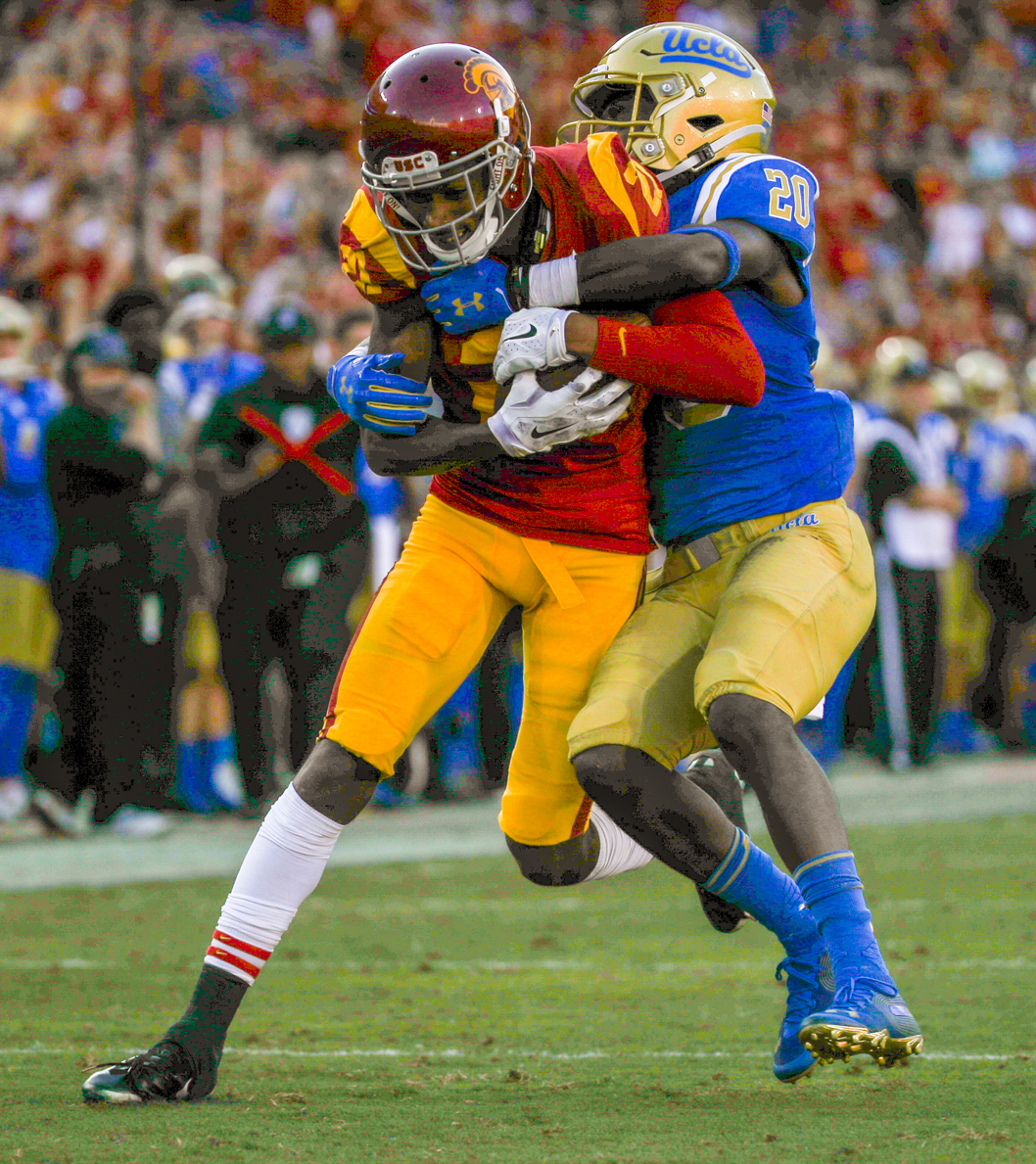
Vaughns scoring a touchdown with USC.

=== Indianapolis Colts ===
Vaughns signed with the Indianapolis Colts as an undrafted free agent on May 6, 2021. He was waived on August 31, and was re-signed to the practice squad the next day, but released two days later.

=== Pittsburgh Steelers ===
On September 7, 2021, Vaughns was signed to the Pittsburgh Steelers' practice squad. He was released by the Steelers on January 14, 2022. Vaughns signed a reserve/future contract with Pittsburgh on January 18. On August 30, Vaughns was waived by the Steelers.

=== Arlington / Dallas Renegades ===
The Arlington Renegades selected Vaughns in the 10th round of the 2023 XFL Supplemental Draft on January 1, 2023. He re-signed with the team on January 22, 2024. On June 2, 2025, Vaughns was named to the All-UFL Team.

=== Colorado Stampede ===
Following the creation of the Colorado Stampede, the entire Renegades roster was transferred to the Stampede.

== XFL/UFL career statistics ==
=== Regular season ===
Year	Team	League	Games		Receiving				
Year	Team	League	GP	GS	Rec	Yds	Avg	Lng	TD
2023	ARL	XFL	9	7	31	302	9.7	27	1
2024	ARL	UFL	10	10	45	503	11.2	39	3
2025	ARL	UFL	10	9	41	475	11.6	41	4
2026	DAL	UFL	10	10	41	527	12.9	59	7
Career			39	36	158	1,807	11.4	59	15

=== Postseason ===
Year	Team	League	Games		Receiving				
Year	Team	League	GP	GS	Rec	Yds	Avg	Lng	TD
2023	ARL	XFL	2	2	11	112	10.2	29	1
Career			2	2	11	112	10.2	29	1

== Records and achievements ==
- Most receptions in a UFL game: 11 (Week 2, 2026)
- Most receiving yards in a UFL game: 146 (Week 2, 2026)
