= Emmanuel Butler =

American football player (born 1996)

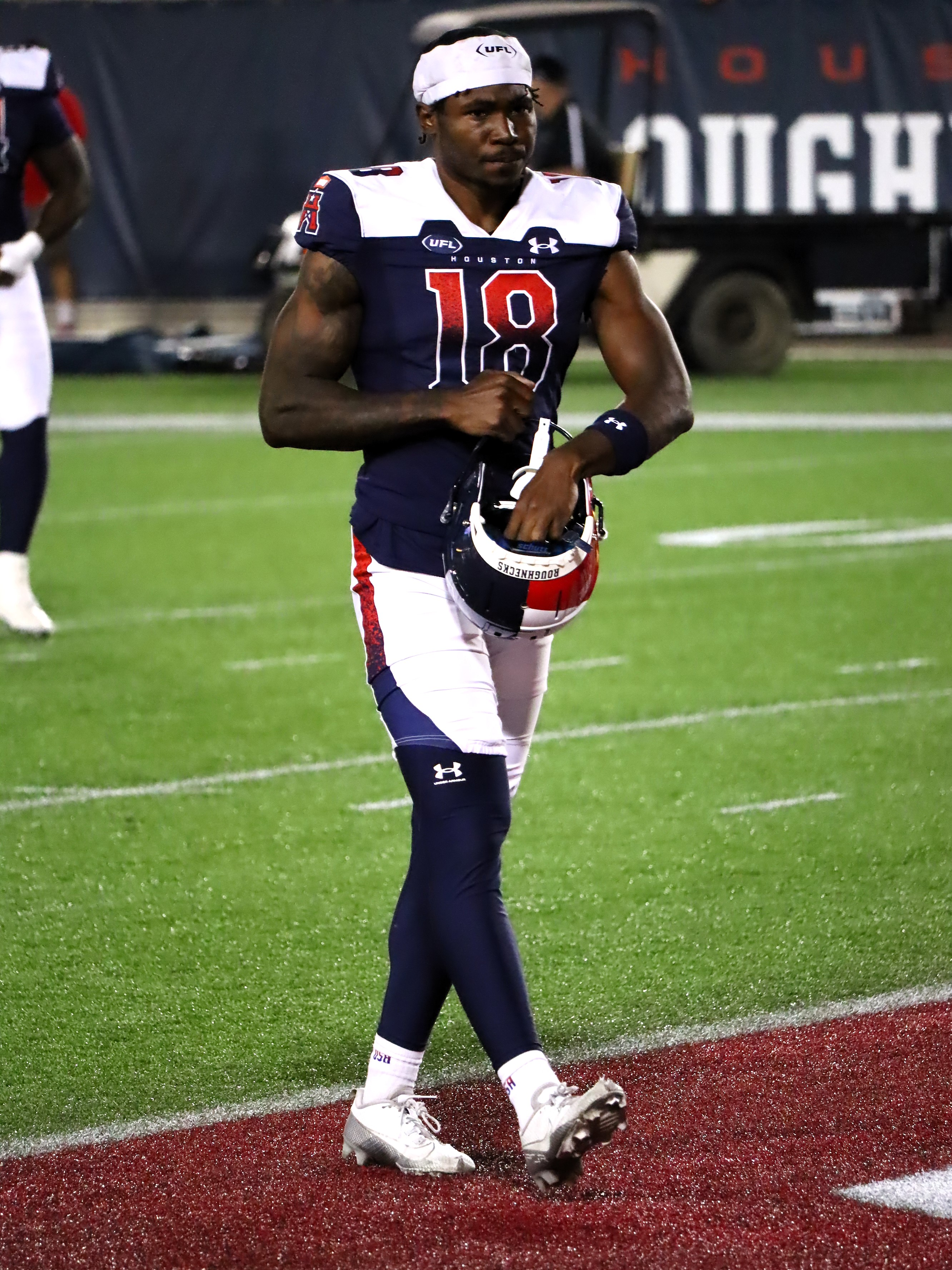
- Butler with the Houston Roughnecks in 2024

No. 17 – Colorado Stampede
- Position: Wide receiver
- Roster status: Active

Personal information
- Born: August 27, 1996 (age 30); Phoenix, Arizona, U.S.
- Listed height: 6 ft 3 in (1.91 m)
- Listed weight: 216 lb (98 kg)

Career information
- High school: Mountain Pointe (Phoenix)
- College: Northern Arizona (2014–2018)
- NFL draft: 2019: undrafted

Career history
- New Orleans Saints (2019)*; Hamilton Tiger-Cats (2021–2022); San Antonio Brahmas (2023); Houston Gamblers / Roughnecks (2023–2025); Dallas Renegades (2026); Colorado Stampede (2027–present)
- * Offseason or practice squad member only

Awards and highlights
- UFL receiving touchdowns leader (2026); 2× First-team All-Big Sky (2015, 2016)
- B/ButlEm01.htm Stats at Pro Football Reference

Emmanuel Butler (born August 27, 1996) is an American professional football wide receiver for the Colorado Stampede of the United Football League (UFL). He played college football at Northern Arizona. He has also played for the New Orleans Saints of the National Football League (NFL), Hamilton Tiger-Cats of the Canadian Football League (CFL), the Houston Gamblers of the United Football League (UFL), and San Antonio Brahmas of the XFL.

== College career ==
Butler played at Northern Arizona from 2015 to 2018. He recorded over 3,217 yards, 187 receptions, and 33 touchdowns. He made the All-Big Sky First Team in 2015, and 2016. He was invited to the 2019 NFL Combine.

== Professional career ==
Pre-draft measurables
Height	Weight	Arm length	Hand span	Wingspan	40-yard dash	10-yard split	20-yard split	20-yard shuttle	Three-cone drill	Vertical jump	Broad jump	Bench press
6 ft 3 1/8 in (1.91 m)	217 lb (98 kg)	33 in (0.84 m)	10 1/8 in (0.26 m)	6 ft 7 3/8 in (2.02 m)	4.75 s	1.66 s	2.67 s	4.22 s	7.41 s	36.0 in (0.91 m)	9 ft 11 in (3.02 m)	11 reps
All values from NFL Combine/Pro Day

=== New Orleans Saints ===
After going undrafted in the 2019 NFL draft, Butler signed with the New Orleans Saints of the National Football League (NFL) on May 3, 2019. He was released on September 1, 2019, but was re-signed to the practice squad the next day. he was signed to a future deal on January 6, 2020. he was released on September 5, 2020.

=== Hamilton Tiger-Cats ===
On March 26, 2021, Butler was signed by Hamilton Tiger-Cats of the Canadian Football League (CFL). He was placed on the suspended list on July 19. He was released on July 30, 2021.

On December 30, 2021, Butler was re-signed by the Tiger-Cats. He was released on June 5, 2022. On July 18, he was re-signed to the active roster. On July 25, he was signed to the practice squad. He was released on August 2, 2022.

=== San Antonio Brahmas ===
On March 8, 2023, Butler was signed by the San Antonio Brahmas of the XFL. he was released on April 28.

=== Houston Gamblers / Roughnecks ===
On June 16, 2023, Butler signed with the Houston Gamblers of the United States Football League (USFL). Butler and all other Gamblers players and coaches were all transferred to the Houston Roughnecks after it was announced that the Gamblers took on the identity of their XFL counterpart, the Roughnecks. He was re-signed on August 14, 2024.

=== Dallas Renegades ===
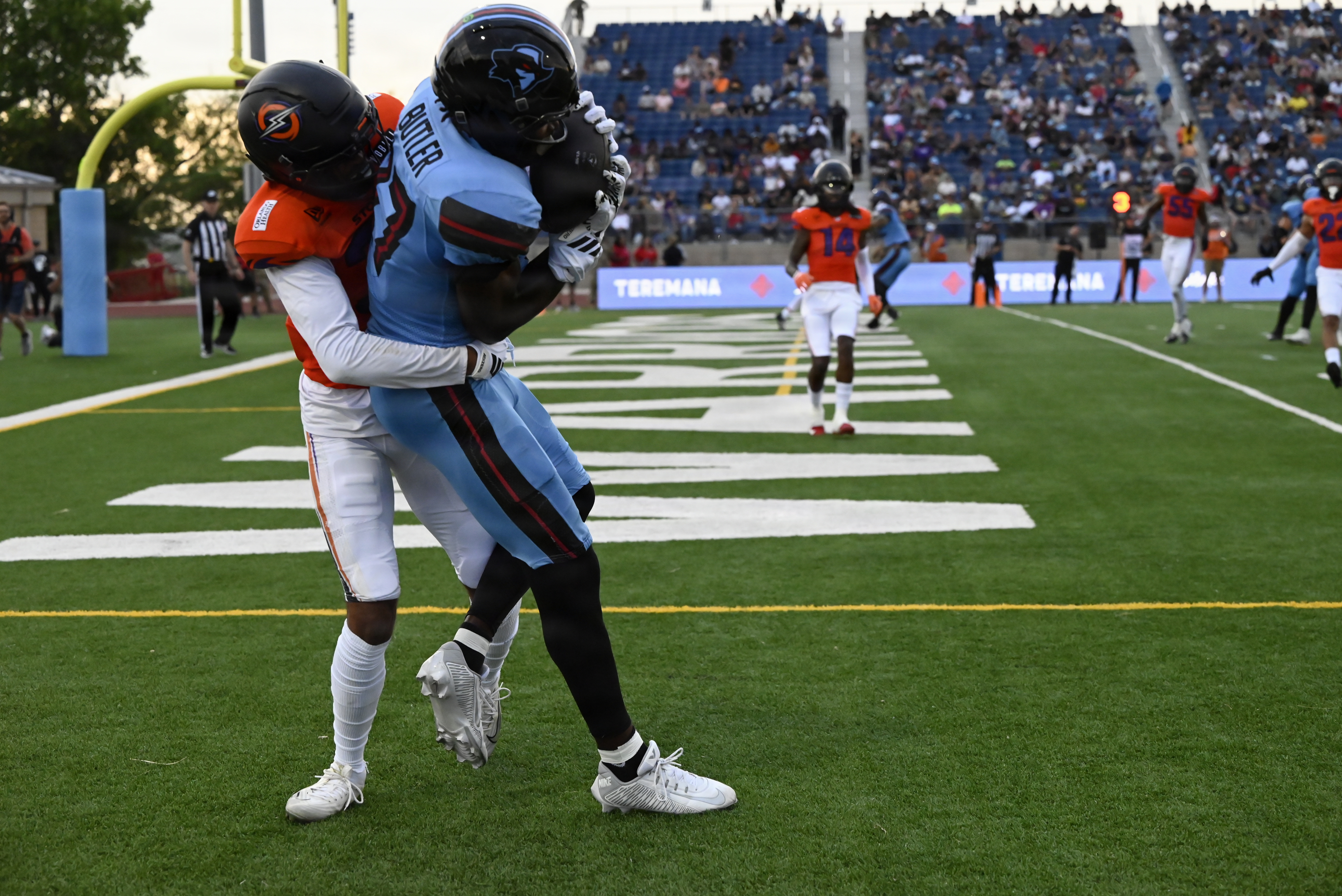
Butler (right) catches a touchdown pass against the Orlando Storm in 2026

On February 19, 2026, Butler signed with the Dallas Renegades of the United Football League (UFL).

== Career statistics ==
=== College ===
Season	Team	Games		Receiving			
Season	Team	GP	GS	Rec	Yards	Avg	TD
2014	NAU	12	2	13	235	18.1	2
2015	NAU	11	11	64	1,208	18.9	15
2016	NAU	11	11	69	1,003	14.5	9
2017	NAU	2	2	6	95	15.8	0
2018	NAU	9	9	35	676	19.3	7
Career		45	35	187	3,217	17.2	33

=== CFL ===
Season	Team	Games		Receiving			
Season	Team	GP	GS	Rec	Yards	Avg	TD
2022	HAM	1	1	3	30	10.0	0
Career		1	1	3	30	10.0	0

=== XFL/USFL/UFL ===
Year	League	Team	Games		Receiving			
Year	League	Team	GP	GS	Rec	Yards	Avg	TD
2023	XFL	SA	1	1	0	0	0.0	0
2023	USFL	HOU	1	0	1	18	18.0	0
2024	UFL	HOU	10	4	16	238	14.9	1
2025	UFL	HOU	3	2	3	39	13.0	2
Career			15	7	20	295	14.6	3
