= Luis Perez (gridiron football) =

American football player (born 1994)

- Perez with the Toronto Argonauts in 2026

No. 16 – Toronto Argonauts
- Position: Quarterback
- Roster status: Practice roster
- CFL status: Active

Personal information
- Born: August 26, 1994 (age 32); San Diego, California, U.S.
- Listed height: 6 ft 3 in (1.91 m)
- Listed weight: 214 lb (97 kg)

Career information
- High school: Otay Ranch (Chula Vista, California)
- College: Southwestern (CA) (2013–2014); Texas A&M–Commerce (2015–2017)
- NFL draft: 2018: undrafted

Career history
- Los Angeles Rams (2018)*; Birmingham Iron (2019); Philadelphia Eagles (2019)*; Detroit Lions (2019)*; Los Angeles Wildcats (2020)*; New York Guardians (2020); New Jersey Generals (2022); Los Angeles Rams (2022)*; Vegas Vipers (2023); Arlington Renegades (2023–2024); Los Angeles Chargers (2024)*; Arlington / Dallas Renegades (2025–2026); St. Louis Battlehawks (2026); Toronto Argonauts (2026–present)
- * Offseason or practice squad member only

Awards and highlights
- XFL champion (2023); XFL Championship Game MVP (2023); 2× UFL passing yards leader (2024, 2025); UFL completion percentage leader (2025); UFL passing touchdown leader (2024); UFL passer rating leader (2024); USFL passer rating leader (2022); USFL completion percentage leader (2022); Harlon Hill Trophy (2017); NCAA Division II national champion (2017); First-team All-American (2017); LSC Offensive Player of the Year (2017); 2× First-team All-LSC (2016, 2017)

Career spring football statistics as of Week 10, 2026
- Passing attempts: 1,603
- Passing completions: 1,036
- Completion percentage: 64.6
- TD–INT: 64–34
- Passing yards: 10,990
- QB rating: 89.0
- Rushing yards: 269
- Rushing touchdowns: 3

Luis Francisco Perez (born August 26, 1994) is an American professional football quarterback for the Toronto Argonauts of the Canadian Football League (CFL). Nicknamed the "Spring King", he played college football for the Texas A&M–Commerce Lions from 2015 to 2017. Prior to that, he played junior college football for the Southwestern Jaguars. He was awarded the Harlon Hill Trophy in 2017 as the best football player in NCAA Division II and led the Lions to their second national championship in football during the 2017 season, their first since 1972.

Perez was not drafted in the 2018 NFL draft, but was signed as an undrafted free agent by the Los Angeles Rams. He has played in the Alliance of American Football, the 2020 iteration of the XFL, the 2022 iteration of the United States Football League, the 2023 iteration of the XFL, and the current United Football League. The longest tenured spring football quarterback to have never started an NFL game, he is widely considered to be one of the greatest spring football players of all time. He is best known for winning the 2023 XFL Championship with the Arlington Renegades, in which Perez was named MVP of the Championship Game after leading the Renegades to a 35–26 victory over the D.C. Defenders.

== Early life ==
Perez was born in San Diego, California, to Juan and Carla Perez. His father was a professional soccer player in his native country of Mexico. Perez grew up in the Rancho Del Rey neighborhood of Chula Vista, California and started playing quarterback at a young age in Junior High.

As a child, Perez went bowling with his family. Eventually, he started attending a bowling league every Tuesday at age nine before being entered into tournaments. He soon became a top rated amateur in California, bowling 12 perfect games with the plan to go to a university on a bowling scholarship. He chose not to pursue a Professional Bowlers Association membership mainly because he felt he could continue to bowl well into middle age but did not have that luxury with football: "I can bowl when I'm 50 years old. I can't play football when I'm 50."

He attended Otay Ranch High School. Perez played sub-varsity football his first two years, in addition to basketball. He was moved to tight end to play in ORHS's Wing T offense, but stopped playing football due to frequently being moved to different positions, never playing varsity football. He graduated from Otay Ranch in 2012.

== College career ==
=== Southwestern College ===
After training himself in quarterback fundamentals by watching YouTube videos, Perez walked on as a football player at Southwestern College in his hometown of Chula Vista with no experience at the high school varsity level. He was recommended to switch positions but ignored it, instead opting to start as the 9th of 9 quarterbacks on the depth chart for the Jaguars, but eventually became the starter due to injuries and transfers of other players, earning the second spot on the depth chart during the fall camp of 2013. At the third week of Southwestern's 2013 season, the starter was injured, leading to Perez's debut for the team against Los Angeles Pierce College, throwing for 250 yards, two touchdown passes and one rushing touchdown, leading the team to a win. He played roughly half the season before injuring his leg. He started again the next season and led the Jaguars to a conference title and all-conference honors throwing for 280 in 3 or more games and his best game of the season being against San Bernardino, throwing for 299 yards and 3 touchdowns on 31–44 attempts.

=== Texas A&M–Commerce ===
After his 2014 season at Southwestern, Perez visited NCAA Division I schools in hope of a scholarship including UC Davis, Oklahoma State and several others because of what he described as "living on that Division I dream". Perez transferred to play for Texas A&M University–Commerce (now named East Texas A&M University), at that time a Division II school in Northeast Texas. He redshirted his first year on campus during the 2015 season while the Lions won their second straight Lone Star Conference title with fellow Southern California native Harrison Stewart as the starting quarterback. The 2015 Lions qualified for the NCAA Division II playoffs for the first time since 1995.

Perez nabbed the starting quarterback job over fellow redshirt transfer Gabriel Rodriguez in 2016. In doing so, he became the first player of Mexican-American or Hispanic descent to start at quarterback for the Lions. The Lions won 10 regular season games and repeated as Lone Star conference champions. The Lions defeated Colorado Mesa in the first round of the NCAA Division II playoffs, their first win in the Division II playoffs since 1991, before bowing out to the Grand Valley State Lakers in the second round. Perez was first-team All-Conference, a Harlon Hill Award nominee, and Honorable Mention All-American.

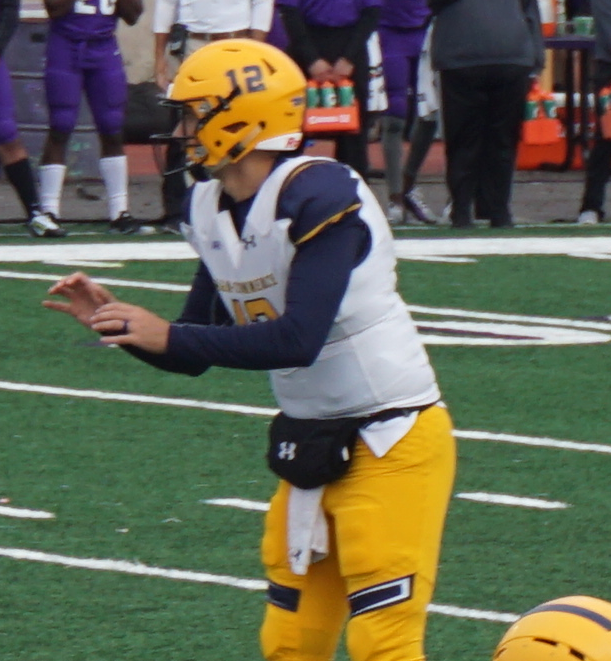
Perez with Texas A&M–Commerce in 2017.

In 2017, Perez and the Lions went 10–1 in the regular season and finished second in the Lone Star Conference behind Midwestern State University and qualified for the NCAA Division II playoffs for the third straight year. The Lions defeated Winona State in the first round of the playoffs 20–7 and then knocked off the top ranked team in the region, the Central Washington Wildcats, in a double overtime thriller, 34–31. In the Super Region 4 final, the Lions defeated a heavily favored Minnesota State team by a 31–21 score, setting them up to host the National semi-final against the Harding Bison at Memorial Stadium in Commerce. It was the first appearance in the semifinals since the 1980 season when the Lions advanced to the National Association of Intercollegiate Athletics (NAIA) national semi-finals. The Lions downed the Bison's top ranked rushing attack 31–17 to advance to the National title game. Prior the national title game, Perez was awarded with the Harlon Hill Trophy, as the best football player in Division II. The Lions defeated the West Florida Argonauts in the national title game, giving A&M–Commerce their second national title in school history and their first since joining the NCAA in 1982. Perez once again was first-team All-LSC in addition to being named National Offensive player of the year, Lone Star Conference Offensive Back of the Year, and First-team All-American. He participated in the NFLPA Collegiate Bowl at the Rose Bowl in Pasadena, California, for his final college game. In his final season with the Lions, Perez passed for 298.3 yards per game ranking ninth throughout the entire NCAA, one of the only three players in all NCAA divisions with over 5,000 passing yards. Perez had completed 590-of-880 passes and had the Texas A&M–Commerce record of 22–3.

== Professional career ==
Pre-draft measurables
Height	Weight	Arm length	Hand span	Wingspan	40-yard dash	10-yard split	20-yard split	20-yard shuttle	Three-cone drill	Vertical jump
6 ft 2 3/4 in (1.90 m)	219 lb (99 kg)	31 3/4 in (0.81 m)	9 3/4 in (0.25 m)	6 ft 2 1/2 in (1.89 m)	5.27 s	1.70 s	2.94 s	4.56 s	7.41 s	30.0 in (0.76 m)
All values from Pro Day

=== Los Angeles Rams (first stint) ===
Perez was not selected in the 2018 NFL draft, however he was invited to attend rookie mini-camp for the Los Angeles Rams. He officially signed with the Los Angeles Rams as an undrafted free agent on May 14, 2018. Perez participated in Rams training camp and saw his first pro football action during the Rams' final preseason game on August 30, 2018, at New Orleans. Playing the entire second half, Perez completed 8-of-15 passes for 43 yards with an interception as the host Saints defeated the Rams 28–0. He was waived on September 1, 2018, and was signed to the practice squad the next day. He was released on September 18, 2018.

=== Birmingham Iron ===
After being waived by the Rams, Perez signed with the San Antonio Commanders of the new Alliance of American Football (AAF). On November 27, he was drafted in the first round, fifth overall by the Birmingham Iron in the AAF's quarterback draft.

In his first game for the Iron on February 10, 2019, against the Memphis Express, Perez threw for 252 yards on 19 of 33 passing, leading the team to a shutout victory of 26–0. He finished the season with 1,460 passing yards, 5 touchdowns and 6 interceptions. Perez led Birmingham to a 5–3 record so Birmingham clinched a playoff berth two weeks before the end of the regular season. However the AAF suspended football operations after the eighth week.

=== Philadelphia Eagles ===
After the AAF suspended football operations, Perez signed with the Philadelphia Eagles on April 9, 2019. He was waived by the Eagles on May 13, 2019.

=== Detroit Lions ===
On August 27, 2019, Perez was signed by the Detroit Lions, but was waived four days later.

=== Los Angeles Wildcats ===
To begin the 2020 XFL draft, Perez was one of the 8 "tier 1" quarterbacks who were assigned to each team in the league, where Perez was assigned to the Los Angeles Wildcats. He signed a contract with the team on November 4, 2019. After the Wildcats claimed Josh Johnson in a supplemental draft in November 2019, Perez was traded to the New York Guardians in exchange for quarterback Chad Kanoff on January 19, 2020.

=== New York Guardians ===
He started the season as a second-string quarterback behind Matt McGloin. In week 3 he returned to the field against the St. Louis BattleHawks. He completed 4 out of 5 passes for 39 yards and passed for one touchdown. He was named the Guardians' starting quarterback for week 4, completing 18 of 26 passes for 150 yards and a touchdown in a victory over the Wildcats. In week 5 he started the second time for the New York Guardians in their Game against the Dallas Renegades. He led the Guardians to their second straight win. He completed 16 of 30 passes for 229 yards, one touchdown and one interception.

However the XFL stopped its regular season after 5 weeks due to the COVID-19 pandemic. He had his contract terminated when the league suspended operations on April 10, 2020.

=== The Spring League ===
In 2021, Perez was a starting quarterback for the Jousters of The Spring League. He led the Jousters to the league's first and only Mega Bowl.

=== New Jersey Generals ===
On April 1, 2022, the New Jersey Generals signed Perez to a contract. Perez had gone undrafted in the 2022 USFL draft but was signed as a last-minute addition to the Generals roster after Generals presumptive starting quarterback Ben Holmes suffered a toe injury and was cut from the roster.

On the league's kickoff game on April 16, 2022, Perez threw the first ever touchdown in USFL history. He would finish the inaugural game with 13 completions on 18 attempts for 143 yards and 2 touchdowns, while also losing a fumble. The Generals would lose this game 28–24.

Perez would come into a week 6 game vs Gamblers in relief of De'Andre Johnson. He led a game winning walk off touchdown drive with a quarterback sneak with :02 seconds left. The Generals won 26–25.

=== Los Angeles Rams (second stint) ===
On July 23, 2022, Perez signed with the Los Angeles Rams. He was released by the Rams on August 16.

=== Vegas Vipers ===
Perez was selected by the Vegas Vipers in the 2023 XFL draft. On the opening game of the 2023 season, Perez started for the Vipers, throwing for 249 yards and 2 touchdowns, completing 22 passes out of 36 attempts. Perez also threw two interceptions, resulting in defensive touchdowns as the Vipers lost 22–20 to the Arlington Renegades.

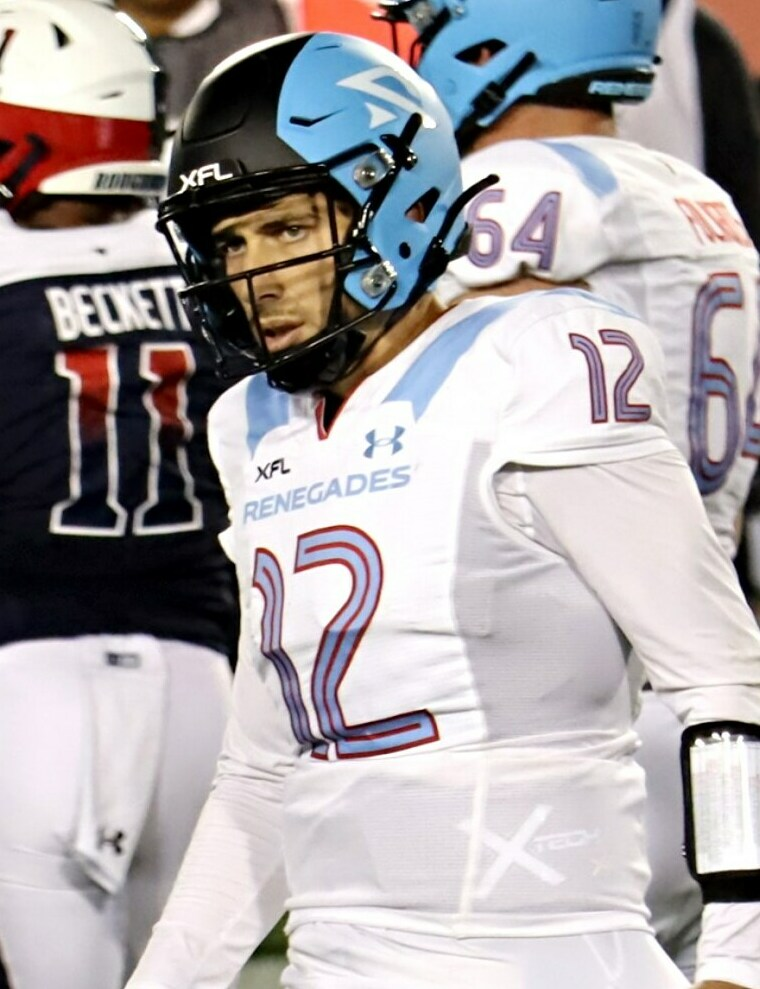
Perez with the Arlington Renegades in 2023

=== Arlington Renegades (first stint) ===
On March 28, 2023, Perez was traded to the Arlington Renegades in exchange for linebacker Ryan Mueller. He led them to the XFL Championship Game, where they upset the DC Defenders 35–26 to win the league title. Perez re-signed with the Renegades on February 22, 2024. In 2024, Perez led the league in passing yards, touchdowns, passer rating, and completions. His contract was terminated on August 6, 2024.

=== Los Angeles Chargers ===
Perez signed with the Los Angeles Chargers on August 6, 2024. He was waived by the Chargers on August 27.

=== Arlington / Dallas Renegades (second stint) ===
On January 2, 2025, Perez announced his intent to re-sign with the Renegades. He was officially re-signed on January 27. During the 2025 season, Perez served as the team’s starting quarterback ahead of Holton Ahlers and Lindsey Scott. For the second consecutive year, he led the league in completions, attempts, and passing yards, while also posting the league’s highest completion percentage. Despite his individual success, the Renegades missed the postseason for the second straight season. Following the season, both Ahlers and Scott retired, and Perez re-signed with the Renegades—who had reverted to the Dallas Renegades name—on October 9.

Perez lost the starting role to Austin Reed prior to the start of the 2026 season, with head coach Rick Neuheisel stating that he “wanted to see what we have in Reed,” while noting that Perez would still see substantial playing time. After four weeks on the active roster, Perez did not appear in a game and was subsequently traded.

=== St. Louis Battlehawks ===
On April 21, 2026, Perez was traded to the St. Louis Battlehawks in exchange for offensive tackle Corey Stewart. Perez was named starting quarterback ahead of the team's May 8 game against the Columbus Aviators.

=== Toronto Argonauts ===
On September 15, 2026, Perez signed with the Toronto Argonauts of the Canadian Football League (CFL) and was assigned to practice roster. He was later promoted to the active roster and dressed in one game as a backup, completing two of three passes for 26 yards.

== Career statistics ==
=== Professional ===
Legend
	Championship Game MVP
	Led the league
	League champion
**Bold**	Career high

==== Regular season ====
Year	Team	League	Games			Passing								Rushing			
Year	Team	League	GP	GS	Record	Cmp	Att	Pct	Yds	Y/A	TD	Int	Rtg	Att	Yds	Avg	TD
2019	BIR	AAF	8	7	4–3	135	258	52.3	1,460	5.7	5	**6**	66.0	**24**	**75**	3.1	0
2020	NY	XFL	5	2	2–0	38	61	62.3	418	6.9	3	1	92.1	4	20	5.0	0
2021	JOU	TSL	6	6	4–2	56	94	59.6	655	7.0	7	4	87.9	4	36	9.0	0
2022	NJ	USFL	9	6	**5–1**	124	173	**71.7**	1,200	6.9	9	1	**105.6**	12	−11	−0.9	**1**
2023	VGS	XFL	6	4	1–3	79	121	65.3	901	**7.4**	8	5	92.3	5	26	**5.2**	0
2023	ARL	XFL	3	3	1–2	69	102	67.6	730	7.2	1	2	83.4	8	35	4.4	0
2024	ARL	UFL	**10**	**10**	3–7	**225**	**336**	67.0	**2,310**	6.9	**18**	4	99.4	7	16	2.3	0
2025	ARL	UFL	**10**	**10**	5–5	224	313	71.6	2,294	7.3	9	5	95.2	15	55	3.7	**1**
2026	DAL	UFL	0	0	—	DNP											
2026	STL	UFL	4	4	2–2	86	145	59.3	1,018	7.1	4	6	72.9	10	17	1.7	1
2026	TOR	CFL	1	0	0–0	2	3	66.7	26	8.7	0	0	98.3	0	0	0.0	0
Career			62	52	27–25	1,038	1,606	64.6	11,019	6.9	64	34	89.0	89	269	3.0	3

==== Postseason ====
Year	Team	League	Games			Passing								Rushing			
Year	Team	League	GP	GS	Record	Cmp	Att	Pct	Yds	Y/A	TD	Int	Rtg	Att	Yds	Avg	TD
2021	JOU	TSL	1	1	0–1	15	21	71.4	203	9.7	2	2	93.9	0	0	0.0	0
2022	NJ	USFL	1	1	0–1	19	25	76.0	191	7.6	0	2	63.9	0	0	0.0	0
2023	ARL	XFL	2	2	2–0	45	63	71.4	577	9.2	6	0	131.5	8	23	2.9	0
2026	STL	UFL	1	1	0–1	27	45	60.0	249	5.5	1	1	73.3	1	-1	-1.0	0
Career			5	5	2–3	106	154	68.8	1,220	7.9	9	5	98.4	9	22	2.4	0

=== College ===
==== CCCAA / NCAA ====
Season	Team	Games			Passing								Rushing			
Season	Team	GP	GS	Record	Cmp	Att	Pct	Yds	Y/A	TD	Int	Rtg	Att	Yds	Avg	TD
2013	Southwestern (CA)	5	1	1–0	42	65	64.6	388	6.0	5	1	137.1	11	–30	–2.7	1
2014	Southwestern (CA)	11	6	5–1	200	295	67.8	1,846	6.3	18	3	138.5	30	0	0.0	0
2015	Texas A&M–Commerce	0	0	—	Redshirted (redshirt)											
2016	Texas A&M–Commerce	13	13	11–2	247	393	62.8	3,375	8.6	33	5	160.2	15	–8	–0.5	0
2017	Texas A&M–Commerce	15	15	14–1	421	596	70.6	4,999	8.4	46	11	162.9	41	–79	–1.9	1
JUCO career		16	7	6−1	242	360	67.2	2,234	6.2	23	4	138.2	41	–30	–0.7	1
D-II career		28	28	25−3	668	989	67.5	8,374	8.5	79	16	161.8	56	–87	–1.6	1

- Perez's start in the season opener against the University of Faith is not included in his official career statistics by the university or other sources. However, his statistics from that game are included here. In that game, he completed 3 of 4 passes for 49 yards and one touchdown (September 1, 2016).

== Career highlights ==
XFL

- XFL champion (2023)
- XFL Championship Game MVP (2023)

UFL

- 2× UFL passing yards leader (2024, 2025)
- UFL passing touchdown leader (2024)

College

- Harlon Hill Trophy (2017)
- NCAA Division II national champion (2017)
- First-team All-American (2017)
- 2× First-team All-Lone Star Conference (2016, 2017)
- J.W. Rollins Award as the Lone Star Conference's Offensive Player of the Year
- Ron Lenz Division II Offensive Player of the Year
- Voted Best Returning Quarterback in DII Football (2016)

== Personal life ==
Perez has been married to his wife Brenda since 2015; the two had dated since junior high school and share a birthday. He graduated from A&M–Commerce on December 14, 2017, along with his wife, the day before winning the National Title.

Perez released an autobiography called "The Spring King" in 2025.
