= Marvin Sanders =

American football player and coach (born 1967)

Current position
- Title: Defensive coordinator & defensive backs coach
- Team: Claremont-Mudd-Scripps
- Conference: SCIAC

Biographical details
- Born: October 2, 1967 (age 59); Chicago, Illinois, U.S.

Coaching career (HC unless noted)
- 1992–1993: Nebraska Wesleyan (DB)
- 1994: Minnesota–Morris (DB)
- 1995–1996: Nebraska–Omaha (DB)
- 1997–1999: Nebraska–Omaha (DC)
- 2000: New Mexico State (DE/LB)
- 2001–2002: Colorado State (DB)
- 2003: Nebraska (DB)
- 2004–2006: North Carolina (DC/DB)
- 2008–2011: Nebraska (DB)
- 2011: Florida Atlantic (DC)
- 2012: USC (DB)
- 2013–2016: Loyola HS (CA)
- 2018: Coastal Carolina (DC)
- 2020: Arlington / Dallas Renegades (DB)
- 2021–present: Claremont Mudd Scripps (DC/DB)
- 2023–2025: Arlington Renegades (DC/DB)
- 2026: Houston Gamblers (DC)

Accomplishments and honors

Records
- XFL champion (2023)

Marvin Sanders (born October 2, 1967) is an American football coach. He is the defensive coordinator and defensive backs coach for Claremont-Mudd-Scripps (the joint intercollegiate sports program of Claremont McKenna College, Harvey Mudd College, and Scripps College), positions he has held since 2021. In the professional ranks, his most recent position was as the defensive coordinator for the Houston Gamblers of the United Football League (UFL), a position he held in 2026.

== Playing career ==
Sanders played safety for the University of Nebraska–Lincoln from 1985 through 1989, earning a letter in each of his last three years. He graduated in 1990 with a Bachelor's Degree in Business Administration.

== Coaching career ==
Sanders began his football coaching career as an assistant coach for Nebraska Wesleyan University just two years after he graduated from Nebraska, putting in two years as the Secondary Coach for the Prairie Wolves football team. He was appointed to continue as a Secondary Coach as well as Sports Information Director for the University of Minnesota Morris in Morris, Minnesota for the 1994 season, and then returned to the State of Nebraska as the Secondary Coach for the Mavericks at the University of Nebraska at Omaha for 1995. UNO promoted Sanders to Defensive coordinator in 1997. During his five-year tenure with the Mavericks, the team won two North Central Conference championships, and made two appearances in the NCAA Division I Football Championship playoffs.

Sanders was hired into his first Division I-A football coaching position in 2000, when he was named by New Mexico State University Head Football Coach and fellow Nebraska alum Tony Samuel as the Defensive Ends and Outside Linebackers Coach for the Aggies. The following season, Colorado State University Head Football Coach Sonny Lubick named Sanders as the Secondary Coach for the Rams. The Rams went 7-5 in 2001, and defeated North Texas in the 2001 New Orleans Bowl. The 2002 season saw an improvement to 10-4 and a Mountain West Conference championship, though the Rams ended the season with a 3-17 loss to TCU in the 2002 Liberty Bowl.

=== Nebraska under Frank Solich ===
Nebraska Head Football Coach Frank Solich brought Sanders back to Lincoln in 2003 amidst a staff shakeup following the Cornhuskers' first non-winning season since 1961. Sanders was now in charge of the defensive backs at Nebraska, where 47 takeaways on the season set a new school record, and the Nebraska Blackshirts set new school and league records with 32 interceptions, the nation's highest-ranked pass efficiency defense, and the nation's second-best scoring defense. Despite the turnaround, Solich was fired after finishing the regular season 9-3. Nebraska Defensive Coordinator Bo Pelini subsequently led the team to a 17-3 victory over Michigan State in the 2003 Alamo Bowl to finish the team's season at 10-3, but he and Sanders, along with nearly all of the remaining staff, were let go after Bill Callahan was appointed as Nebraska's 31st Head Football Coach.

=== North Carolina ===
Sanders was named as co-Defensive Coordinator and Defensive Backs Coach at the struggling North Carolina for 2004. After finishing just 2-10 in 2003 before his arrival, Sanders helped the Tar Heels improve to a 6-6 (5-3 ACC) record and posting the lowest yards allowed by a UNC defense in three years. Under Sanders direction, UNC improved over 60 spots nationally in total defense. UNC Head Football Coach John Bunting was fired halfway through the 2006 season, and replaced by Butch Davis for 2007. Davis did not retain Sanders in his new staff.

=== Nebraska under Bo Pelini ===
After a one-year absence from coaching, Sanders was again brought back to Nebraska following the firing of Bill Callahan after a four-year record of 27-22. Callahan's replacement was former Nebraska Defensive Coordinator Bo Pelini, who had also been let go along with most of Frank Solich's staff after 2003. Pelini installed Sanders as the Secondary Coach for the Cornhuskers as part of his effort to turn around a program that had struggled under Callahan. Nebraska's Blackshirts defense improved to rank as the second best in the Big 12 Conference in 2008 after languishing near the bottom of the pack nationally in the years prior. In 2009, two of Sanders' players were named to the All-Big 12 first team, and the Nebraska secondary was among the highest ranked in the nation with the highest-rated pass defense and highest-rated scoring defense, and among the top ten nationally in rushing defense, sacks, and total defense. The 2009 Nebraska secondary intercepted 18 times while only allowing seven touchdown passes all season.

Sanders resigned from Nebraska on February 3, 2011, citing personal and family reasons.

=== USC Trojans ===
After agreeing to be FAU's defensive coordinator under new head coach Carl Pelini (Bo's brother) on December 5, 2011, Sanders left to become the USC Trojans defensive backs coach on February 12, 2012 under head coach Lane Kiffin. USC had gone through the whole 2011 season without a defensive backs coach as former coach Willie Mack Garza left days before the season opened stemming from his connection to Willie Lyles while at Tennessee. Sanders was the first coach hired by Pelini, as the Owls defensive coordinator. As per USC policy being a private school, Sanders financial agreement was not released. Pelini praised Sanders when he announced the hiring, saying they shared the same philosophy and that he had been the only candidate for the job.

Sanders was relieved of his duties at USC after the school hired Clancy Pendergast to be their defensive coordinator.

=== Loyola ===
Sanders was officially hired as the head coach of one of the top high school football programs in the state of California, Loyola High School of Los Angeles, on February 24, 2013. In four years, he accumulated a 20–22 record and 1–1 in the CIF Division 1 playoffs.

Prior to the 2017 season, Loyola and the Los Angeles Times announced Sanders would not return to lead the Cubs' football program as the head coach.

=== Dallas Renegades ===
After one season as defensive coordinator of the Coastal Carolina Chanticleers football team, Sanders joined the XFL's Dallas Renegades in 2019 as defensive backs coach. In 2023 XFL announced Coach Sanders reunited with Bob Stoops and rejoined the staff for the 2023 season.
