= Dallas Renegades =

UFL (2024) team based in Frisco, Texas

- Current season
Logo	Wordmark
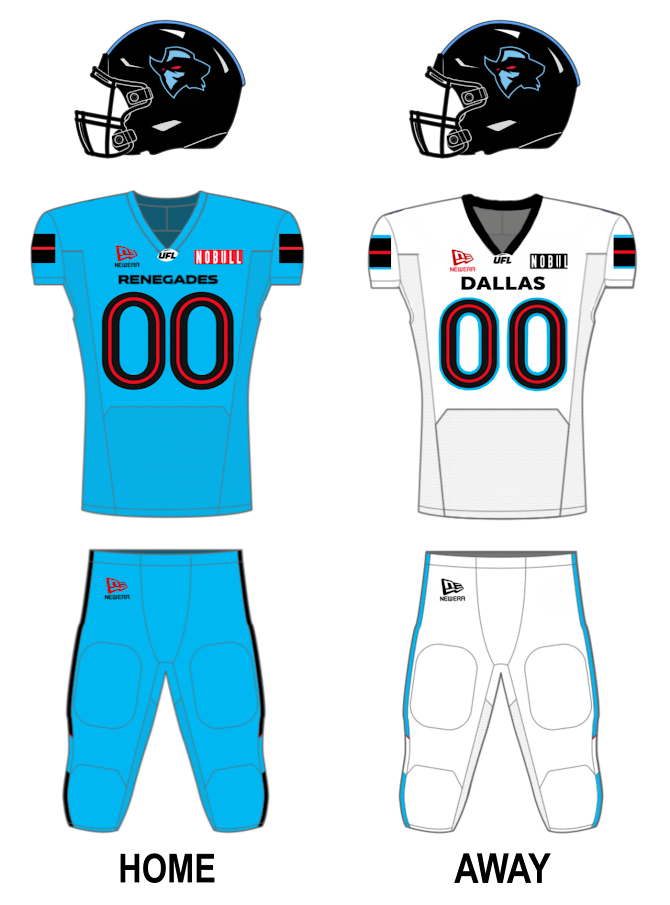
- Uniforms

General information
- Founded: December 5, 2018; 7 years ago
- Stadium: Toyota Stadium; Frisco, Texas
- Colors: Bright blue, black, red
- Mascot: Billy the Bandit
- Website: www.theufl.com/teams/dallas

Personnel
- Owner: League owned
- Head coach: Kevin Sumlin

Team history
- Arlington Renegades (2023–2025); Dallas Renegades (2020, 2026–present)

Home fields
- Choctaw Stadium (2020, 2023–2025); Toyota Stadium (2026–present)

League / conference affiliations
- XFL (2020–2023): West Division (2020); South Division (2023); UFL (2024–present): XFL Conference (2024–2025)

Championships
- League championships: 1 XFL: 2023
- Conference championships: 1: XFL: 2023

Playoff appearances (1)
- XFL: 2023

The Dallas Renegades are a professional American football team based in the Dallas–Fort Worth metroplex. The Renegades compete in the United Football League (UFL). The team was founded as the Dallas Renegades by Vince McMahon's Alpha Entertainment, before being renamed to the Arlington Renegades. The team is currently owned and operated by a consortium led by Mike Repole. The name reverted to the Dallas Renegades ahead of the 2026 UFL season. The Renegades play their home games at Toyota Stadium in Frisco, Texas, having previously played at Choctaw Stadium in Arlington.

In 2023, the Renegades had a regular season record of 4–6, yet they won both of their playoff games, and were crowned XFL champions. They were part of the XFL/USFL merger in 2024.

== History ==
=== Dallas (2020, McMahon era) ===
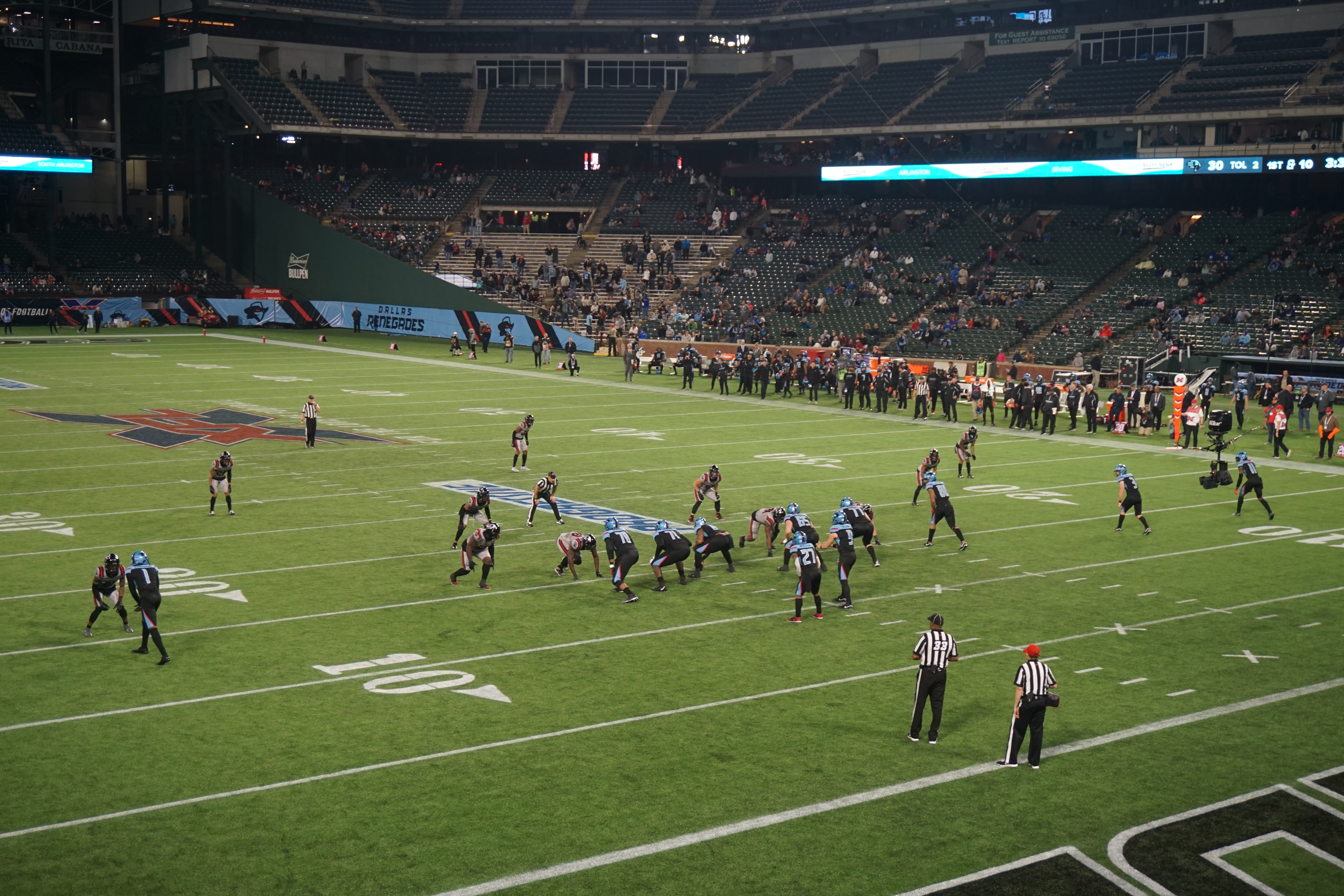
Dallas in action against New York in 2020

On December 5, 2018, Dallas was announced as one of eight cities that would join the newly reformed XFL, as well as Seattle, Houston, Los Angeles, New York, Tampa Bay, and Washington, DC. On February 7, 2019, Bob Stoops, the longtime head coach of the Oklahoma Sooners football team, was hired as the Dallas team's head coach. Stoops was the XFL's first head coaching hire. On April 23, 2019, Stoops named Chris Woods as his defensive coordinator. On May 16, 2019, Stoops named Hal Mumme as his offensive coordinator. The team name and logo were revealed on August 21, 2019, as well as the teams uniforms on December 3, 2019.

On October 15, 2019, the Renegades announced their first player in team history, being assigned former NFL quarterback Landry Jones.

Dallas lost their first game, against the St. Louis Battlehawks, by a 15–9 final. Kicker Austin MacGinnis tallied all of the Renegade points via field goals, but Dallas' failure to reach the end zone came back to haunt them, as St. Louis scored nine unanswered fourth quarter points to erase a slim deficit. Linebacker Tegray Scales had 13 Dallas tackles, three for a loss. The Renegades picked up their first win on the road, a 25–18 triumph over the Los Angeles Wildcats. Running back Cameron Artis-Payne reached the end zone three times on two touchdowns and a one-point conversion. His final score, a 17-yard scoring run in the penultimate minute, was the final blow in a fourth quarter that saw the two teams combine for 34 points. Another road victory awaited the Renegades in Week 3, as they topped the Seattle Dragons 24–12. Two MacGinnis field goals sandwiched a 65-yard touchdown pass from Landry Jones to Donald Parham in a fourth quarter that saw Dallas break a 12–12 tie. Parham reached the end zone twice over the afternoon. The XFL announced that the remainder of the 2020 XFL season had been cancelled due to the COVID-19 pandemic. The team finished with a 2–3 record. On April 10, 2020, the XFL suspended operations, with all employees, players and staff terminated.

=== Arlington (2023–2025, Dwayne Johnson and Dany Garcia era) ===
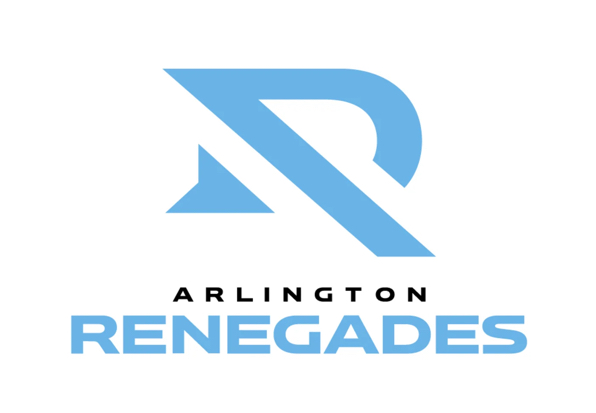
Logo as the Arlington Renegades in 2023.

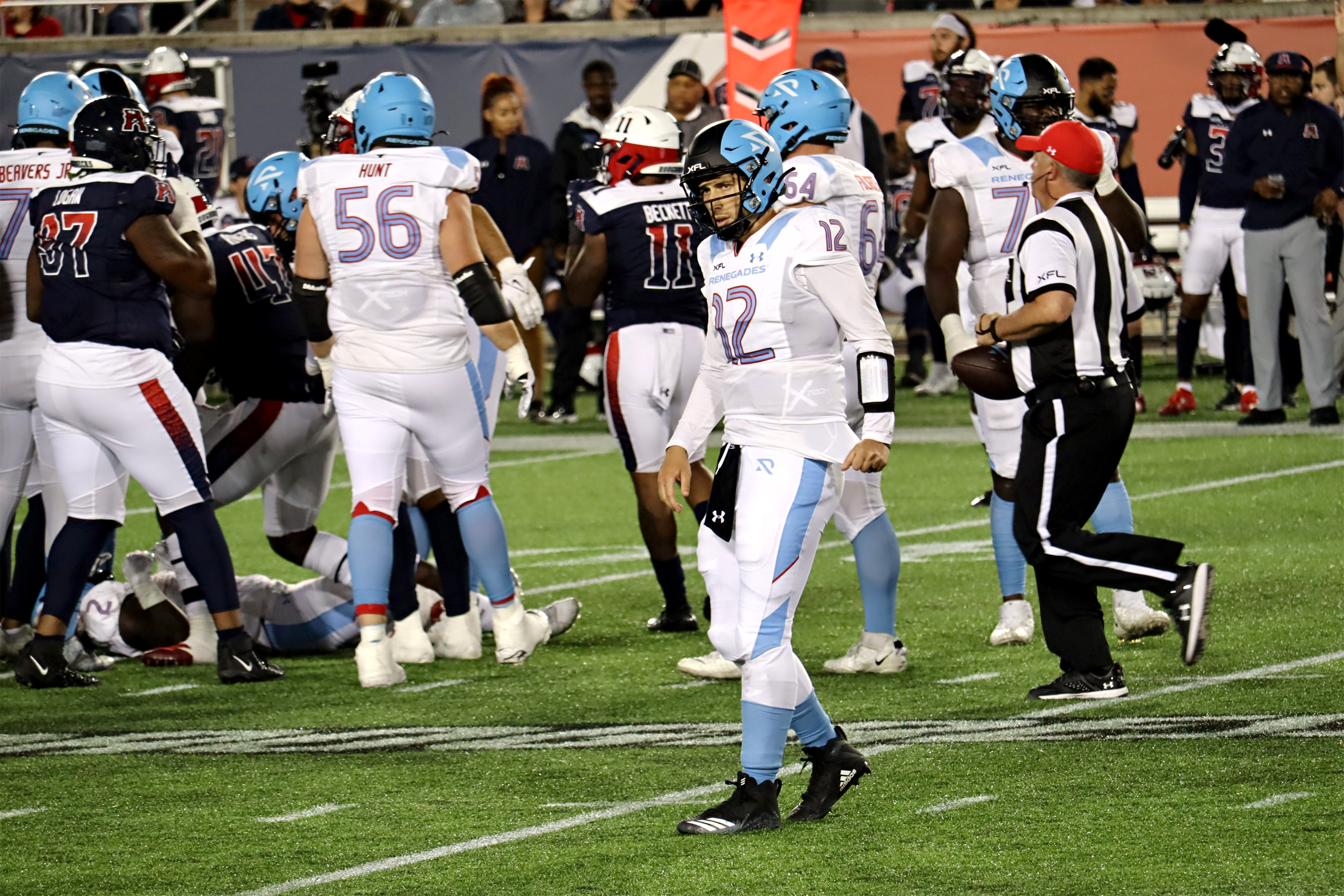
Renegades QB Luis Perez leading the team versus Houston in 2023.

On August 3, 2020, it was reported that a consortium led by Dwayne "The Rock" Johnson, Dany Garcia, and Gerry Cardinale (through Cardinale's fund RedBird Capital Partners) purchased the XFL for $15 million just hours before an auction could take place; the purchase received court approval on August 7, 2020. The XFL hired Bob Stoops as a head coach on April 13, 2022, with the expectation that he would be coaching Dallas. On July 24, 2022, the return of a Dallas XFL franchise was confirmed, this time being known as "Arlington" instead of "Dallas", as well as the hiring of Bob Stoops. On October 31, 2022, the XFL officially announced that the Renegades name would be returning, with a brand new logo. The team went 4–6 in the 2023 season, but made the playoffs as the second team in the South Division. After beating the Houston Roughnecks in the South Division playoff game, it won the 2023 XFL Championship Game over the 10–1 D.C. Defenders by a score of 35–26.

In September 2023, Axios reported that the XFL was in advanced talks with the USFL to merge the two leagues prior to the start of their 2024 seasons. On September 28, 2023, the XFL and USFL announced their intent to merge with details surrounding the merger to be announced at a later date. The merger would also require regulatory approval. In October 2023 the XFL filed a trademark application for the name "United Football League". On November 30, 2023, Garcia announced via her Instagram page that the leagues had received regulatory approval for the merger and were finalizing plans for a "combined season" to begin March 30, 2024. The merger was made official on December 31, 2023.

The Renegades logo, nicknamed "Billy the Bandit" since 2025, had been reduced to secondary status after 2023 following the rebrand to Arlington Renegades, but returned as the primary helmet logo in 2025.

=== Return to Dallas branding (2026–present) ===
On October 7, 2025, the UFL announced that the team would be moving from Choctaw Stadium to Toyota Stadium in Frisco; as a result of the team no longer playing in Arlington, the team will return to its original brand as the Dallas Renegades.

On September 30, 2026, the entirety of the Renegades roster were reassigned to Colorado while the roster for the former Gamblers were summarily assigned to the Renegades, effectively changing the team organization, but not the franchise itself.

== Current roster ==
=== Players ===
Dallas Renegades roster
Quarterbacks (QB): -- T. J. Finley; -- Emory Jones; 9 John Rhys Plumlee; Running backs (RB): 34 Marcus Majors Jr.; 22 Kirk Merritt; 32 Jalen White; 21 Marcus Yarns; Wide receivers (WR): 11 Justin Hall; 13 Jontre Kirklin; 10 Kai Locksley; 7 JaVonta Payton; -- Cashid Raymond; Tight ends (TE): 88 Armani Rogers; 85 Geor'quavius Spivey; 89 Cam Sutton	Offensive linemen (OL): 71 Jackson Carman T; 64 Victor Curne G; 54 Avery Jones G; 65 Jack Kramer C; 73 Tedi Kushi T; 70 Jalen McKenzie T; 77 Gareth Warren G; Defensive linemen (DL): 2 Christopher Allen DE; 99 Jerrod Clark NT; 92 Malik Fisher DE; 90 Rashard Lawrence DT	Linebackers (LB): 28 Marvin Moody Jr. ILB; 5 Charlie Thomas ILB; 47 DaShaun White ILB; Defensive backs (DB): 1 Damon Arnette CB; 24 Nico Bolden S; 33 Ra'Mello Dotson CB; 25 Glendon Miller S; 0 Kary Vincent Jr. CB; 26 Eli Walker SS; Special teams (ST): 46 John Hoyland K; 45 Marco Ortiz LS	37 active As of November 12, 2026. Rookies in italics.: Roster

=== Staff ===
Dallas Renegades staff
Head coach: Head coach – Kevin Sumlin; Offensive coaches: Offensive coordinator – Eric Price; Running backs – KC Gundy; Wide receivers – Tyron Carrier; Offensive line – Tim Holt	Defensive coaches: Defensive coordinator – Marvin Sanders; Linebackers – Grant Dickerson; Safeties – Ted Bolin

== Player history ==
=== Current NFL players ===
Season	Pos	Name	NFL team
2020	LS	Christian Kuntz	Pittsburgh Steelers
2024	DT	Jalen Redmond	Minnesota Vikings
2025	CB	Jayden Price	New Orleans Saints

=== Notable players ===
Season	Pos	Name	NFL team
2020	RB	Lance Dunbar	Former Dallas Cowboys Running Back
2020	QB	Landry Jones	Former Pittsburgh Steelers Quarterback, 2013 4th Round Pick
2023	S	Rahim Moore	Former Denver Broncos Safety, 2011 2nd Round Pick
2023	CB	Cre'Von LeBlanc	Former Philadelphia Eagles Cornerback
2023–2025	P	Marquette King	Former Oakland Raiders Punter
2024	DE	Vic Beasley	Former Atlanta Falcons Linebacker, 2015 1st Round Pick, 2016 Pro Bowler
2025	RB	Kalen Ballage	Former Miami Dolphins Running Back, 2018 4th Round Pick
2025–2026	DE	Taco Charlton	Former Dallas Cowboys Defensive End, 2017 1st Round Pick
2026	WR	Denzel Mims	Former New York Jets Wide Receiver, 2020 2nd Round Pick
2027–present	CB	Damon Arnette	Former Las Vegas Raiders cornerback, 2020 1st Round Pick
2027–present	OT	Jackson Carman	Former Cincinnati Bengals offensive tackle, 2021 2nd Round Pick

== Coach history ==
=== Head coach history ===
#	Name	Term	Regular season				Playoffs			Awards
#	Name	Term	GC	W	L	Win %	GC	W	L	Awards
Arlington / Dallas Renegades
1	Bob Stoops	2020, 2023–2025	35	14	21	.400	2	2	0	*2023 XFL Champions
Dallas Renegades
2	Rick Neuheisel	2026	10	4	6	.400	–	–	–	
3	Kevin Sumlin	2027–present	–	–	–	–	–	–	–	

=== Offensive coordinator history ===
#	Name	Term	Regular season				Playoffs			Awards
#	Name	Term	GC	W	L	Win %	GC	W	L	Awards
Dallas Renegades
1	Hal Mumme	2020	5	2	3	.400	–	–	–	
Arlington / Dallas Renegades
2	Jonathan Hayes	2023	10	4	6	.400	2	2	0	*2023 XFL Champions; co-coordinator with Chuck Long in 2023
3	Chuck Long	2023–2025	30	12	18	.400	2	2	0	*2023 XFL Champions co-coordinator with Jonanthan Hayes in 2023
Dallas Renegades
4	Noel Mazzone	2026	10	4	6	.400	–	–	–	
5	Eric Price	2027–present	–	–	–	–	–	–	–	

=== Defensive coordinator history ===
#	Name	Term	Regular season				Playoffs			Awards
#	Name	Term	GC	W	L	Win %	GC	W	L	Awards
Dallas Renegades
1	Chris Woods	2020	5	2	3	.400	–	–	–	
Arlington / Dallas Renegades
2	Tim Lewis	2023	10	4	6	.400	2	2	0	*2023 XFL Champions; co-coordinator with Jay Hayes in 2023
3	Jay Hayes	2023–2025	30	12	18	.400	2	2	0	*2023 XFL Champions; co-coordinator with Tim Lewis in 2023
Dallas Renegades
4	Mike Gillhamer	2026	10	4	6	.400	–	–	–	
5	Marvin Sanders	2027–present	–	–	–	–	–	–	–	

== Championships ==
The Renegades have won one XFL Championship and one South Division Championship, both in 2023.

Year	Coach	XFL Championship Game	Stadium	Location	Opponent	Score	MVP	Record
2023	Bob Stoops	2023	Alamodome	San Antonio, Texas	DC Defenders	35–26	Luis Perez	4–6
Total XFL championships won:								1

=== South Division Championship Games ===
Year	Coach	Stadium	Location	Opponent	Score	Record
2023	Bob Stoops	TDECU Stadium	Houston, Texas	Houston Roughnecks	26–11	4–6
Total South Division championship games won:						1

== Rivalries ==
=== San Antonio Brahmas ===
The Renegades were in-state conference rivals with the San Antonio Brahmas. The teams had a split series. However, following the UFL's 2026 realignment, the series has ended due to the Brahmas folding.

=== Houston Gamblers ===
The Renegades are also in-state, out-of-conference rivals with the Houston Gamblers, having always shared a league with a Houston-based team. Games between the Renegades and the Houston Roughnecks, one of the XFL's first major rivalries to develop, were marketed as the Texas Throwdown. For 2026, the Houston-Dallas rivalry was renamed the Battle of Texas.

=== DC Defenders ===
The Renegades and Defenders have met seven times; DC leads the series 5–2. The two were scheduled to meet in Week 6 of the 2020 XFL season, but the league ceased operations one week before the game due to COVID-19 concerns. The first official meeting of the two teams occurred during Week 9 of the 2023 XFL regular season at Audi Field. DC won the game 28–26 when the game ended in overtime after Jordan Ta'amu completed a pass to wide receiver Josh Hammond for the sole 2 point play scored by either team. This, however, would not be the last meeting of the season for the two out-of-division rivals. After successfully winning the XFL South Division title as underdogs, the Renegades found themselves up against the XFL North Division Champion DC Defenders once again in the 2023 XFL Championship Game at the Alamodome in San Antonio. Arlington quickly found itself with a 17–0 lead with 4:54 left in the second quarter. By the end of the game, Renegades quarterback Luis Perez would throw for 288 yards and 3 touchdowns. The Renegades would finish the game never trailing DC, winning the game 35–26 and their first XFL title in franchise history. This would also mark the first win over Jordan Ta'amu for the franchise as well, reaching this feat on the third meeting of the quarterback and the Renegades franchise.

=== St. Louis Battlehawks ===
The two teams have met three times, with St. Louis winning all meetings in the series. The team, then the Dallas Renegades, first met the Battlehawks in each franchise's inaugural game during Week 1 of the 2020 XFL season. The game was played at Globe Life Park (Now Choctaw Stadium). St. Louis would win the 15–9 on the back of future familiar Renegades foe Jordan Ta'amu. The teams met for the second time during Week 4 of the 2023 XFL season, this time at The Dome at America's Center in St. Louis, falling short to the Battlehawks once again. The Renegades/Battlehawks rivalry had some heat for indirect reasons, in part because of the Renegades' qualifying for the playoffs with a losing record in 2023 while the Battlehawks, who were three games ahead of Arlington in the overall standings, had tied with Seattle for the last playoff spot but had lost out on it because of tiebreakers.

=== Franchise matchup history ===
Team	Record	Pct.
Birmingham Stallions	0–3	.000
Columbus Aviators	1–1	.500
DC Defenders	2–6	.250
Houston Roughnecks (2020)	1–3	.250
Houston Gamblers	2–1	.667
Los Angeles Wildcats	1–0	1.000
Louisville Kings	0–2	.000
Memphis Showboats	2–0	1.000
Michigan Panthers	0–2	.000
Orlando Guardians	2–1	.667
Orlando Storm	0–1	.000
San Antonio Brahmas	1–3	.250
Seattle Sea Dragons	1–1	.500
St. Louis Battlehawks	4–4	.500
Vegas Vipers	1–0	1.000

- Defunct teams in light gray.

== Season-by-season record ==
UFL champions^{†} (2024–present)	XFL champions^{§} (2023)	Conference champions^{*}	Division champions^{^}	Wild Card berth^{#}

Season	Team	League	Conference	Division	Regular season			Postseason results	Awards	Head coaches	Pct.
Season	Team	League	Conference	Division	Finish	W	L	Postseason results	Awards	Head coaches	Pct.
2020	2020	XFL	—N/a	West	2nd	2	3	Season Suspended after 5 games due to COVID-19		Bob Stoops	.400
2021	No Season									Bob Stoops	.400
2022	No Season									Bob Stoops	.400
2023	2023	XFL^{§}	—N/a	South^{^}	2nd^{#}	4	6	Won Division Finals (at Roughnecks) 26–11; Won XFL Championship (vs. Defenders) 35–26	Luis Perez (CG MVP)	Bob Stoops	.400
2024	2024	UFL	XFL	—N/a	4th	3	7			Bob Stoops	.400
2025	2025	UFL	XFL	—N/a	3rd	5	5			Bob Stoops	.400
2026	2026	UFL	—N/a	—N/a	T–5th	4	6			Rick Neuheisel	.400
Total						18	27	All-time regular season record (2020–2026)			.400
Total						2	0	All-time postseason record (2020–2026)			1.000
Total						20	27	All-time regular season and postseason record (2020–2026)			.426
Total						1 XFL Championship title					

== Records ==
All-time Renegades leaders
Leader	Player	Record	Years with Renegades
Passing yards	Luis Perez	5,338 passing yards	2023–2026
Passing Touchdowns	Luis Perez	28 passing touchdowns	2023–2026
Rushing yards	De'Veon Smith	823 rushing yards	2023–2025
Rushing Touchdowns	De'Veon Smith	14 rushing touchdowns	2023–2025
Receiving yards	Tyler Vaughns	1,807 receiving yards	2023–present
Receiving Touchdowns	Tyler Vaughns	15 receiving touchdowns	2023–present
Receptions	Tyler Vaughns	158 receptions	2023–present
Tackles	Donald Payne	246 tackles	2023–present
Sacks	Willie Taylor III	16.5 sacks	2023–present
Interceptions	Joe Powell	7 interceptions	2023–2025
Coaching wins	Bob Stoops	14 wins	2020, 2023–2025

=== Starting quarterbacks ===
Regular season – As of March 28, 2026

Season(s)	Quarterback(s)	Notes	Ref
2020	Landry Jones (2–1) / Philip Nelson (0–2)		
2021–2022	Suspended operations		
2023	Kyle Sloter (2–2) / Drew Plitt (1–2) / Luis Perez (1–2)		
2024	Luis Perez (3–7)		
2025	Luis Perez (5–5)		
2026	Austin Reed (3-3)		

Postseason

Season(s)	Quarterback(s)	Notes	Ref
2023	Luis Perez (2–0)	MVP	

Most games as starting quarterback

Name	Period	GP	GS	W	L	Pct
Luis Perez	2023–2025	23	23	9	14	.391
Austin Reed	2026	6	6	3	3	.500
Kyle Sloter	2023	6	4	2	2	.500
Landry Jones	2020	4	3	2	1	.667
Drew Plitt	2023	5	3	1	2	.333
Philip Nelson	2020	5	2	0	2	.000

=== Year by year ===
Season	Head Coach	League	Avg. Crowd	Home Record
2020	Bob Stoops	XFL	17,163	0–3
2023	Bob Stoops	XFL	12,055	2–3
2024	Bob Stoops	UFL	9,887	2–3
2025	Bob Stoops	UFL	9,763	3–2
2026	Rick Neuheisel	UFL	6,731	3—1

== Market overview ==
The Renegades and the NFL's Dallas Cowboys are currently the two professional outdoor football teams that play in the Dallas-Fort Worth Metroplex. Dallas was previously home to the NFL's Dallas Texans in 1952 and the American Football League's Dallas Texans from 1960 to 1962. Other outdoor professional outdoor football teams included the Dallas Rockets and Fort Worth Braves of the Texas Football League which folded midway through the 1971 season. The metro area has been represented by numerous indoor teams, such as the Arena Football League's Dallas Texans, Fort Worth Cavalry, Dallas Desperados and Dallas Vigilantes, and the Allen Wranglers and Texas Revolution. It entered a relatively crowded sports market to share with the NHL Dallas Stars, NBA Dallas Mavericks, WNBA Dallas Wings, MLB Texas Rangers, MLS FC Dallas, NLL Panther City Lacrosse Club, and MLR Dallas Jackals.
