= 2020 Detroit Lions season =

American football team season

- Owner: Sheila Ford Hamp
- General manager: Vacant (Bob Quinn fired Nov. 28)
- Head coach: Matt Patricia (fired Nov. 28; 4–7 record); Darrell Bevell (interim; 1–4 record; COVID-19 Week 16); Robert Prince (interim Week 16; 0–1 record)
- Home stadium: Ford Field

Results
- Record: 5–11
- Division place: 4th NFC North
- Playoffs: Did not qualify
- All-Pros: C Frank Ragnow (2nd team); P Jack Fox (2nd team)
- Pro Bowlers: TE T. J. Hockenson; C Frank Ragnow; P Jack Fox

Uniform
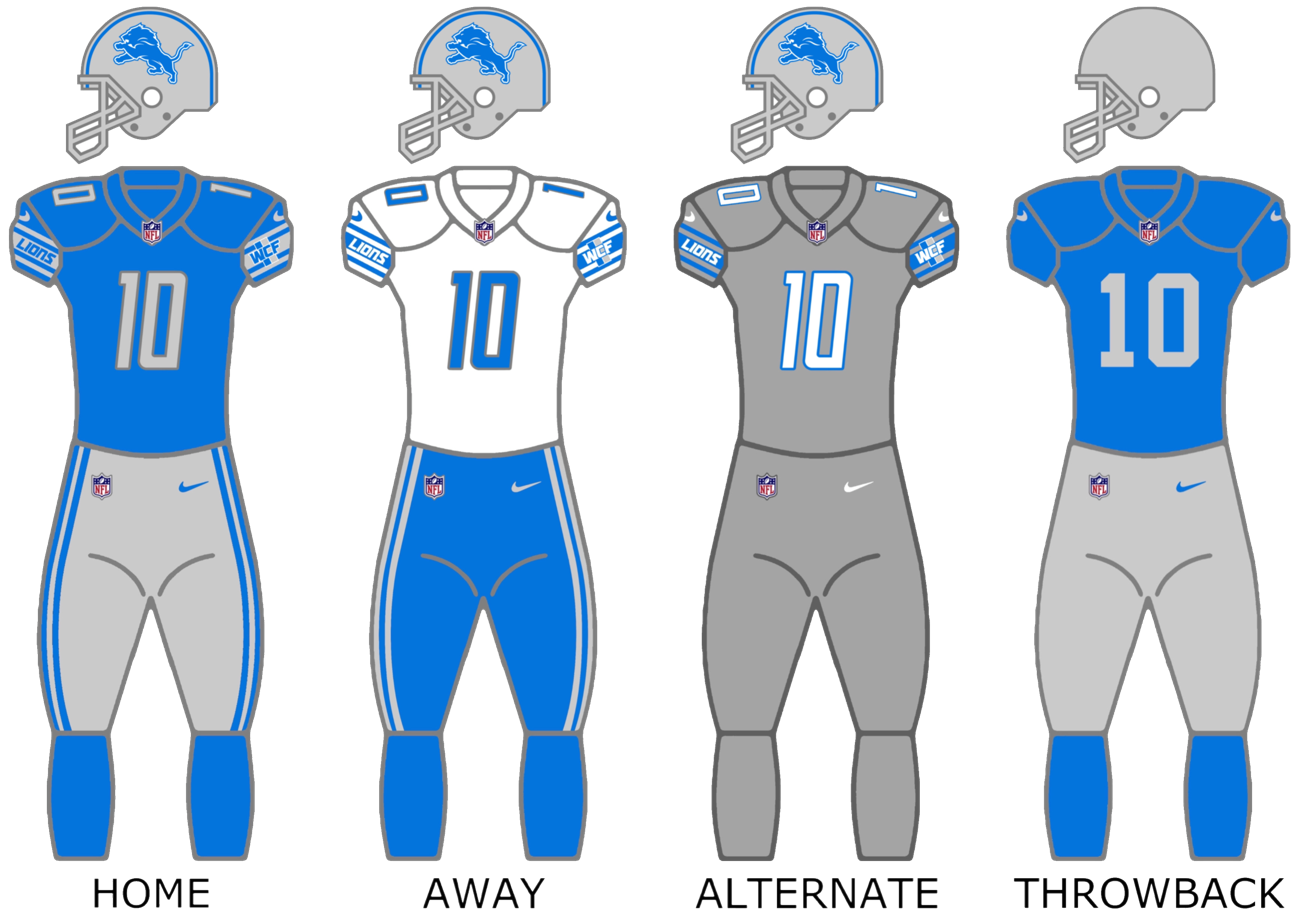

The 2020 season was the Detroit Lions' 91st in the National Football League (NFL) and their third and final season under head coach Matt Patricia. The Lions improved on their 3–12–1 record from the previous season, but were eliminated from playoff contention for the fourth consecutive year following their loss to the Tennessee Titans in Week 15. The Lions finished 5–11, and last place in the NFC North for the third consecutive season. Further, the 2020 Lions defense had one of the worst seasons in NFL history, setting franchise records for points allowed (519, 3rd worst in NFL history) and yards allowed (6,716, 3rd worst in NFL history) in a season, both marks topping the 2008 team.

2020 was Matthew Stafford’s twelfth and final year with Detroit, as he was traded to the Los Angeles Rams in exchange for quarterback Jared Goff and three draft picks on January 31, 2021.

On June 23, 2020, Detroit Lions' principal owner Martha Firestone Ford stepped down, passing ownership to her daughter Sheila Ford Hamp.

Following the Lions' Thanksgiving Day loss to the Houston Texans, both Patricia and general manager Bob Quinn were fired and offensive coordinator Darrell Bevell took over as interim head coach. Patricia finished his tenure in Detroit with a record of 13–29–1 (.314). Additionally, the Lions fired special teams coordinator Brayden Coombs on December 21.

== Offseason ==
=== Coaching changes ===
- On December 31, 2019, the Lions fired strength coach Harold Nash, special-teams coordinator John Bonamego, defensive backs coach Brian Stewart, linebackers coach Al Golden, tight ends coach Chris White and assistant strength coach Rodney Hill.
- On January 2, 2020, defensive coordinator Paul Pasqualoni retired and offensive line coach Jeff Davidson took an "indefinite leave" from coaching.
- On January 13, the Lions hired Cory Undlin as defensive coordinator.

=== Additions ===
Date	Player	Position	Previous team	Contract	Source
February 3	Joshua Garnett	Guard	San Francisco 49ers	1 year / $1.3 million	
March 16	Halapoulivaati Vaitai	Offensive tackle	Philadelphia Eagles	5 years / $45 million	
March 16	Jamie Collins	Linebacker	New England Patriots	3 years / $30 million	
March 16	Nick Williams	Defensive tackle	Chicago Bears	2 years / $10 million	
March 17	Chase Daniel	Quarterback	Chicago Bears	3 years / $13.05 million	
March 18	Danny Shelton	Defensive tackle	New England Patriots	2 years / $8 million	
March 18	Desmond Trufant	Cornerback	Atlanta Falcons	2 years / $21 million	
March 19	Jayron Kearse	Safety	Minnesota Vikings	1 year / $2 million	
March 20	Tony McRae	Cornerback	Cincinnati Bengals	1 year / $1.5 million	
March 27	Reggie Ragland	Linebacker	Kansas City Chiefs	1 year / $1.0475 million	
March 27	Elijah Lee	Linebacker	San Francisco 49ers	1 year / $835,000	
March 29	Geronimo Allison	Wide receiver	Green Bay Packers	1 year / $1.0475 million	
April 2	Darryl Roberts	Cornerback	New York Jets	1 year / $2 million	
May 1	Hunter Bryant	Tight end	Washington	Undrafted FA	
May 1	Jeremiah Dinson	Safety	Auburn	Undrafted FA	
May 1	Jalen Elliott	Safety	Notre Dame	Undrafted FA	
May 1	Bobby Price	Safety	Norfolk State	Undrafted FA	
May 1	Luke Sellers	Fullback	South Dakota State	Undrafted FA	
May 1	Arryn Siposs	Punter	Auburn	Undrafted FA	
May 1	Steven Wirtel	Long snapper	Iowa State	Undrafted FA	
May 22	Logan Stenberg	Guard	Kentucky	4 years / $4.036 million	
May 22	John Penisini	Defensive tackle	Utah	4 years / $3.466 million	
June 9	Julian Okwara	Defensive end	Notre Dame	4 years / $4.92 million	
June 24	Jonah Jackson	Offensive guard	Ohio State	4 years / $4.79 million	
July 13	Jeff Okudah	Cornerback	Ohio State	4 years / $33.5 million	
July 13	D'Andre Swift	Running back	Georgia	4 years / $8.53 million	
July 13	Quintez Cephus	Wide receiver	Wisconsin	4 years / $3.599 million	
July 13	Jason Huntley	Running back	New Mexico State	4 years / $3.58 million	
August 2	Jashon Cornell	Defensive tackle	Ohio State	4 years / $3.37 million	
August 17	Jonathan Williams	Running back	Indianapolis Colts	1 year / $910,000	
August 23	Will Clarke	Defensive end	St. Louis BattleHawks	1 year / $910,000	
August 27	Kevin Wilkins	Defensive end	Philadelphia Eagles	1 year / $610,000	
August 31	Olive Sagapolu	Defensive tackle	Green Bay Packers	1 year / $610,000	
September 6	Adrian Peterson	Running back	Washington Football Team	1 year / $1.05 million	
October 30	Jonathan Williams	Running back	Washington Football Team		

=== Departures ===
Date	Player	Position	Note	New Team	Source
February 25	Damon Harrison	Defensive tackle	Released	Seattle Seahawks	
March 13	Rick Wagner	Offensive tackle	Released	Green Bay Packers	
March 16	Graham Glasgow	Guard	UFA	Denver Broncos	
March 16	Jeff Driskel	Quarterback	UFA	Denver Broncos	
March 17	A. J. Howard	Safety	Released		
March 17	Kyle Sloter	Quarterback	Released	Chicago Bears	
March 18	Devon Kennard	Linebacker	Released	Arizona Cardinals	
March 19	A'Shawn Robinson	Defensive tackle	UFA	Los Angeles Rams	
March 24	Sam Martin	Punter	UFA	Denver Broncos	
April 15	Steve Longa	Linebacker	Released		
April 15	Paul Butler	Tight end	Released		
April 15	Jonathan Durhart	Wide receiver	Released		
April 27	Tra Carson	Running back	Released		
April 27	James Fisher	Long snapper	Released		
April 27	Casey Tucker	Guard	Released		
April 27	Matt Wile	Punter	Released		
August 17	Wes Hills	Running back	Waived		
August 23	Caleb Benenoch	Guard	Released	New England Patriots	
August 27	Olive Sagapolu	Defensive tackle	Waived		
September 1	Geremy Davis	Wide receiver	Released		
September 5	Oday Aboushi	Guard	Released		
September 5	Beau Benzchawel	Guard	Released		
September 5	David Blough	Quarterback	Released		
September 5	Victor Bolden Jr.	Wide receiver	Released		
September 5	Will Clarke	Defensive end	Released		
September 5	Jalen Elliott	Safety	Released		
September 5	Frank Herron	Defensive tackle	Released		
September 5	Wes Hills	Running back	Released		
September 5	Albert Huggins	Defensive tackle	Released	Minnesota Vikings	
September 5	Jason Huntley	Running back	Released	Philadelphia Eagles	
September 5	Tom Kennedy	Wide receiver	Released		
September 5	Chris Lacy	Wide receiver	Released	Dallas Cowboys	
September 5	Isaac Nauta	Tight end	Released		
September 5	Anthony Pittman	Linebacker	Released		
September 5	Bobby Price	Safety	Released		
September 5	Olive Sagapolu	Defensive tackle	Released		
September 5	Arryn Siposs	Punter	Released		
September 5	Matt Sokol	Tight end	Released		
September 5	Kevin Strong	Defensive tackle	Released		
September 5	Dee Virgin	Cornerback	Released		
September 5	Kenny Wiggins	Guard	Released	New York Giants	
September 5	Kevin Wilkins	Defensive tackle	Released		
September 5	Jonathan Williams	Running back	Released		
September 5	Steve Wirtel	Long snapper	Released		

=== Re-signings ===
Date	Player	Position	Contract	Source
February 22	Danny Amendola	Wide receiver	1 year / $5 million	
March 14	Don Muhlbach	Long snapper	1 year / $1.135 million	
March 21	Miles Killebrew	Linebacker	1 year / $2 million	
March 24	Oday Aboushi	Guard	1 year / $1.1875 million	
April 14	Kenny Wiggins	Guard	1 year / $1.1875 million	
April 21	Mike Ford	Cornerback	1 year / $750,000	
April 21	Dee Virgin	Cornerback	1 year / $750,000	
August 20	Chris Lacy	Wide receiver	2 years / $1.08 million	
August 20	Wes Hills	Running back	2 years / $1.08 million	

=== Trades ===
- On March 18, the Lions acquired safety Duron Harmon and a seventh-round pick from the New England Patriots in exchange for a fifth-round pick in the 2020 NFL draft.
- On March 19, the Lions traded cornerback Darius Slay to the Philadelphia Eagles in exchange for a third-round pick and a fifth-round pick in the 2020 NFL Draft.
- On October 27, the Lions acquired defensive end Everson Griffen from the Dallas Cowboys in exchange for a conditional sixth-round draft pick in the 2021 NFL draft.

=== Draft ===
2020 Detroit Lions Draft
Round	Selection	Player	Position	College	Notes	Source
1	3	Jeff Okudah	CB	Ohio State		
2	35	D'Andre Swift	RB	Georgia		
3	67	Julian Okwara	DE	Notre Dame		
3	75	Jonah Jackson	G	Ohio State	from Indianapolis	
4	121	Logan Stenberg	G	Kentucky	from Las Vegas	
5	166	Quintez Cephus	WR	Wisconsin		
5	172	Jason Huntley	RB	New Mexico State	from Las Vegas	
6	197	John Penisini	DT	Utah	from Indianapolis	
7	235	Jashon Cornell	DT	Ohio State	from New England	

Notes

- The Indianapolis Colts traded a third and sixth-round selection (75th and 197th) to Detroit in exchange for a third, fifth, and sixth-round selection (85th, 149th, 182nd).
- The Lions traded their fourth-round selection (109th) to the Las Vegas Raiders in exchange for a fourth and fifth-round selection (121st and 172nd).
- On August 23, 2018, the Lions traded a conditional seventh-round selection to the San Francisco 49ers in exchange for linebacker Eli Harold.
- On October 22, 2019, the Lions traded safety Quandre Diggs and a seventh-round pick in the 2021 NFL draft to the Seattle Seahawks in exchange for a fifth-round pick in the 2020 NFL draft.

=== Impact of the COVID-19 pandemic ===
The COVID-19 pandemic caused the preseason to be cancelled.

On July 29, the Lions placed five players, including wide receiver Kenny Golladay and tight end T. J. Hockenson, on the COVID-19 reserve list. The following day, two more players, including cornerback Justin Coleman, were placed on the list. On August 1, the Lions placed quarterback Matthew Stafford on the list. Three days later, however, Stafford's test was confirmed to be a false positive and he was removed from the list.

Most games this season were played behind closed doors, with crowds at some stadiums limited to friends and families of the players, coaches, and staff members.

Several members of the Lions coaching staff, including interim head coach Darrell Bevell, had to quarantine during the week 16 game against the Tampa Bay Buccaneers due to an outbreak.

== Staff ==
Following the Lions' Thanksgiving Day loss to the Houston Texans, both Patricia and general manager Bob Quinn were relieved of their duties with offensive coordinator Darrell Bevell taking over as interim head coach. Patricia finished his tenure in Detroit with a record of 13–29–1 (.314). Additionally, the Lions fired special teams coordinator Brayden Coombs on December 21. Due to Coronavirus restrictions, Robert Prince was the acting head coach when the team faced the Tampa Bay Buccaneers.

2020 Detroit Lions staff
Front office: Owner – Sheila Ford Hamp; Vice chairpeople – William Clay Ford Jr., Martha Ford Morse and Elizabeth Ford Kontulis; Team president – Rod Wood; Executive vice president / general manager - Bob Quinn / Vacant; Vice president of football administration – Mike Disner; Vice president of player personnel – Kyle O'Brien; Director of player personnel – Lance Newmark; Director of pro scouting – Rob Lohman; Senior personnel executive – Jimmy Raye III; Head coaches: Interim head coach/offensive coordinator – Darrell Bevell; Offensive coaches: Quarterbacks – Sean Ryan; Running backs – Kyle Caskey; Wide receivers – Robert Prince; Tight ends – Ben Johnson; Offensive line – Hank Fraley; Assistant offensive line – Billy Yates; Offensive assistant – Tanner Engstrand	Defensive coaches: Defensive coordinator – Cory Undlin; Defensive line – Bo Davis; Linebackers – Tyrone McKenzie; Defensive backs – Steve Gregory; Defensive assistant - Tony Carter; Defensive quality control – Stephen Thomas; Special teams coaches: Interim Special teams coordinator – Marquice Williams; Strength and conditioning: Head strength & conditioning – Josh Schuler; Assistant strength & conditioning – Morris Henry

== Final roster ==
2020 Detroit Lions roster
Quarterbacks (QB): 10 David Blough; 4 Chase Daniel; 9 Matthew Stafford; Running backs (RB): 45 Jason Cabinda; 33 Kerryon Johnson; 28 Adrian Peterson; 32 D'Andre Swift; Wide receivers (WR): 39 Jamal Agnew; 80 Danny Amendola; 87 Quintez Cephus; 19 Kenny Golladay; 11 Marvin Jones; 12 Mohamed Sanu; Tight ends (TE): 86 Hunter Bryant; 88 T. J. Hockenson; 83 Jesse James	Offensive linemen (OL): 76 Oday Aboushi G; 65 Tyrell Crosby T; 66 Joe Dahl G/C; 68 Taylor Decker T; 73 Jonah Jackson G; 67 Matt Nelson T; 77 Frank Ragnow C; 70 Dan Skipper T; 61 Logan Stenberg G; 72 Halapoulivaati Vaitai G/T; Defensive linemen (DL): 94 Austin Bryant DE; 98 Everson Griffen DE; 99 Julian Okwara DE; 95 Romeo Okwara DE; 91 John Penisini DT; 71 Danny Shelton DT; 92 Kevin Strong DT; 97 Nick Williams DT	Linebackers (LB): 58 Jamie Collins OLB; 40 Jarrad Davis MLB; 52 Christian Jones OLB; 59 Reggie Ragland MLB; 44 Jalen Reeves-Maybin OLB; 51 Jahlani Tavai MLB; Defensive backs (DB): 27 Justin Coleman CB; 38 Mike Ford CB; 26 Duron Harmon SS; 25 Will Harris FS; 35 Miles Killebrew SS; 49 C. J. Moore FS; 24 Amani Oruwariye CB; 47 Bobby Price SS; 29 Darryl Roberts CB; 21 Tracy Walker FS; Special teams (ST): 3 Jack Fox P; 48 Don Muhlbach LS; 5 Matt Prater K	Practice squad: 84 Jerell Adams TE; 16 Victor Bolden Jr. WR; 31 Tramaine Brock CB; 62 Evan Brown C; 13 Dalyn Dawkins RB; 46 Jalen Elliott FS; 36 Josh Hawkins CB; 64 Albert Huggins DT; 85 Tom Kennedy WR; 69 Kareem Martin DE; 43 Alexander Myres CB (PS/I); 57 Anthony Pittman OLB; 18 Jordan Scarlett RB; 2 Arryn Siposs P; 8 Jordan Ta'amu QB; 74 Jon Toth C; 14 Kerrith Whyte WR (PS/I); 54 Steven Wirtel LS; Reserve: 18 Geronimo Allison WR (Opt-out); 99 John Atkins DT (Opt-out); 46 Nick Bawden FB (IR); 60 Russell Bodine C (Opt-out); 96 Jashon Cornell DT (IR); 90 Trey Flowers DE (IR); 93 Da'Shawn Hand DT (IR); 34 Tony McRae CB (IR); 30 Jeff Okudah CB (IR); 23 Desmond Trufant CB (IR); Rookies in italics 53 active, 10 reserve, 16 practice squad (2 exempt)

== Preseason ==
The Lions' preseason schedule was announced on May 7, but was later cancelled due to the COVID-19 pandemic.

Week	Date	Opponent	Venue	Result
1	August 13	at New England Patriots	Gillette Stadium	Cancelled due to the COVID-19 pandemic
2	August 20	New York Jets	Ford Field	Cancelled due to the COVID-19 pandemic
3	August 27	at Miami Dolphins	Hard Rock Stadium	Cancelled due to the COVID-19 pandemic
4	September 3	Buffalo Bills	Ford Field	Cancelled due to the COVID-19 pandemic

== Regular season ==
=== Schedule ===
Week	Date	Opponent	Result	Record	Venue	Recap
1	September 13	**Chicago Bears**	**L** 23–27	0–1	Ford Field	Recap
2	September 20	at **Green Bay Packers**	**L** 21–42	0–2	Lambeau Field	Recap
3	September 27	at Arizona Cardinals	**W** 26–23	1–2	State Farm Stadium	Recap
4	October 4	New Orleans Saints	**L** 29–35	1–3	Ford Field	Recap
5	Bye					
6	October 18	at Jacksonville Jaguars	**W** 34–16	2–3	TIAA Bank Field	Recap
7	October 25	at Atlanta Falcons	**W** 23–22	3–3	Mercedes-Benz Stadium	Recap
8	November 1	Indianapolis Colts	**L** 21–41	3–4	Ford Field	Recap
9	November 8	at **Minnesota Vikings**	**L** 20–34	3–5	U.S. Bank Stadium	Recap
10	November 15	Washington Football Team	**W** 30–27	4–5	Ford Field	Recap
11	November 22	at Carolina Panthers	**L** 0–20	4–6	Bank of America Stadium	Recap
12	November 26	Houston Texans	**L** 25–41	4–7	Ford Field	Recap
13	December 6	at **Chicago Bears**	**W** 34–30	5–7	Soldier Field	Recap
14	December 13	**Green Bay Packers**	**L** 24–31	5–8	Ford Field	Recap
15	December 20	at Tennessee Titans	**L** 25–46	5–9	Nissan Stadium	Recap
16	December 26	Tampa Bay Buccaneers	**L** 7–47	5–10	Ford Field	Recap
17	January 3	**Minnesota Vikings**	**L** 35–37	5–11	Ford Field	Recap

Note: Intra-division opponents are in bold text.

=== Game summaries ===
==== Week 1: vs. Chicago Bears ====
Week 1: Chicago Bears at Detroit Lions – Game summary

Quarter	1	2	3	4	Total
**Bears**	3	3	0	21	**27**
Lions	3	10	10	0	**23**

at Ford Field, Detroit, Michigan

- Date: September 13
- Game time: 1:00 p.m. EDT
- Game weather: None (indoor stadium)
- Game attendance: 0
- Referee: Alex Kemp
- TV announcers (Fox): Dick Stockton, Jonathan Vilma and Shannon Spake
- Recap, Game Book

Game information

**First quarter**

- DET – Matt Prater 27-yard field goal, 6:30. Lions 3–0. **Drive: 7 plays, 56 yards, 2:27.**

**Second quarter**

- CHI – Cairo Santos 35-yard field goal, 12:37. Tied 3–3. **Drive: 10 plays, 58 yards, 5:00.**
- DET – Matt Prater 32-yard field goal, 5:36. Lions 6–3. **Drive: 12 plays, 73 yards, 5:11.**
- CHI – Cairo Santos 28-yard field goal, 2:06. Tied 6–6. **Drive: 8 plays, 67 yards, 3:31.**
- DET – D'Andre Swift 1-yard run (Matt Prater kick), 0:19. Lions 13–6. **Drive: 4 plays, 48 yards, 0:21.**

**Third quarter**

- DET – T. J. Hockenson 4-yard pass from Matthew Stafford (Matt Prater kick), 10:37. Lions 20–6. **Drive: 8 plays, 72 yards, 4:23.**
- DET – Matt Prater 44-yard field goal, 3:24. Lions 23–6. **Drive: 8 plays, 64 yards, 4:10.**

**Fourth quarter**

- CHI – Jimmy Graham 2-yard pass from Mitchell Trubisky (Cairo Santos kick), 13:39. Lions 23–13. **Drive: 11 plays, 59 yards, 4:40.**
- CHI – Javon Wims 1-yard pass from Mitchell Trubisky (Cairo Santos kick), 2:58. Lions 23–20. **Drive: 5 plays, 55 yards, 1:04.**
- CHI – Anthony Miller 27-yard pass from Mitchell Trubisky (Cairo Santos kick), 1:54. Bears 27–23. **Drive: 2 plays, 37 yards, 0:41.**

**Top passers**

- CHI – Mitchell Trubisky – 20/36, 242 yards, 3 TD
- DET – Matthew Stafford – 24/42, 297 yards, TD, INT

**Top rushers**

- CHI – David Montgomery – 13 rushes, 64 yards
- DET – Adrian Peterson – 14 rushes, 93 yards

**Top receivers**

- CHI – Anthony Miller – 4 receptions, 76 yards, TD
- DET – Danny Amendola – 5 receptions, 81 yards

The Lions began their season by hosting their divisional rival, the Chicago Bears. Detroit opened the scoring in the first quarter via a 27-yard field goal by Matt Prater. The Bears got on the board in the second quarter via a 35-yard field goal by Cairo Santos to tie the game. The teams exchanged field goals, first a 32-yard field goal by Prater, then a 28-yard field goal by Santos. The Lions responded with a one-yard touchdown run from D'Andre Swift, making the score 13–6 in favor of Detroit at half-time. The Lions extended their lead in the third quarter via a four-yard touchdown pass from Matthew Stafford to T. J. Hockenson and a 44-yard field goal by Prater. The Bears responded with 21-unanswered points in the fourth quarter via a two-yard touchdown pass from Mitchell Trubisky to Jimmy Graham, a one-yard touchdown pass from Trubisky to Javon Wims and a 27-yard touchdown pass from Trubisky to Anthony Miller. The Lions' attempted comeback failed when Swift dropped the go-ahead touchdown with 11 seconds remaining in the game, making the final score 27–23 in favor of Chicago. This was the Lions' 10th consecutive loss dating back to Week 9 of last season. It also marks the team's fifth straight loss to Chicago. Jamie Collins, one of the Lions' linebackers got ejected for contacting a referee.

==== Week 2: at Green Bay Packers ====
Week 2: Detroit Lions at Green Bay Packers – Game summary

Quarter	1	2	3	4	Total
Lions	14	0	0	7	**21**
**Packers**	3	14	17	8	**42**

at Lambeau Field, Green Bay, Wisconsin

- Date: September 20
- Game time: 1:00 p.m. EDT/12:00 p.m. CDT
- Game weather: 66 °F (19 °C), sunny
- Game attendance: 0
- Referee: Clete Blakeman
- TV announcers (Fox): Chris Myers, Greg Jennings, Brock Huard and Jen Hale
- Recap, Game Book

Game information

**First quarter**

- DET – Kerryon Johnson 1-yard run (Matt Prater kick), 10:33. Lions 7–0. **Drive: 8 plays, 75 yards, 4:27.**
- GB – Mason Crosby 43-yard field goal, 5:46. Lions 7–3. **Drive: 12 plays, 50 yards, 4:51.**
- DET – Marvin Jones 4-yard pass from Matthew Stafford (Matt Prater kick), 0:04. Lions 14–3. **Drive: 13 plays, 75 yards, 5:38.**

**Second quarter**

- GB – Aaron Jones 7-yard pass from Aaron Rodgers (Mason Crosby kick), 10:09. Lions 14–10. **Drive: 9 plays, 75 yards, 4:55.**
- GB – Robert Tonyan 11-yard pass from Aaron Rodgers (Mason Crosby kick), 0:14. Packers 17–14. **Drive: 4 plays, 62 yards, 0:46.**

**Third quarter**

- GB – Aaron Jones 75-yard run (Mason Crosby kick), 14:59. Packers 24–14. **Drive: 1 play, 75 yards, 0:12.**
- GB – Chandon Sullivan 7-yard interception return (Mason Crosby kick), 8:37. Packers 31–14. **Drive: 1 play, 0 yards, 0:05.**
- GB – Mason Crosby 35-yard field goal, 1:36. Packers 34–14. **Drive: 12 plays, 69 yards, 6:01.**

**Fourth quarter**

- DET – Marvin Hall 24-yard pass from Matthew Stafford (Matt Prater kick), 13:00. Packers 34–21. **Drive: 8 plays, 75 yards, 3:32.**
- GB – Aaron Jones 14-yard run (Jamaal Williams run), 7:59. Packers 42–21. **Drive: 7 play, 74 yards, 5:01.**

**Top passers**

- DET – Matthew Stafford – 20/33, 244 yards, 2 TD, INT
- GB – Aaron Rodgers – 18/30, 240 yards, 2 TD

**Top rushers**

- DET – Adrian Peterson – 7 rushes, 41 yards
- GB – Aaron Jones – 18 rushes, 168 yards, 2 TD

**Top receivers**

- DET – T. J. Hockenson – 4 receptions, 62 yards
- GB – Aaron Jones – 4 receptions, 68 yards, TD

In week 2, the Lions visited their divisional rival, the Green Bay Packers. The Lions opened the scoring in the first quarter via a one-yard touchdown run from Kerryon Johnson. The Packers responded with a 43-yard field goal by Mason Crosby. The Lions extended their lead via a four-yard touchdown pass from Matthew Stafford to Marvin Jones. The Packers scored 14 points in the second quarter via a seven-yard touchdown pass from Aaron Rodgers to Aaron Jones and an 11-yard touchdown pass from Rodgers to Robert Tonyan, making the score 17–14 in favor of Green Bay at half-time. The Packers scored 17 points in the third quarter via a 75-yard touchdown run from Jones, a seven-yard interception return by Chandon Sullivan, and a 35-yard field goal by Crosby. The teams exchanged touchdowns in the fourth quarter, first a 24-yard touchdown pass from Stafford to Marvin Hall, then a 14-yard touchdown run from Jones, and a two-point conversion run by Jamaal Williams, making the final score 42–21 in favor of Green Bay. This was the Lions' 11th consecutive loss dating back to Week 9 of last season.

==== Week 3: at Arizona Cardinals ====
Week 3: Detroit Lions at Arizona Cardinals – Game summary

Quarter	1	2	3	4	Total
**Lions**	3	14	3	6	**26**
Cardinals	7	6	10	0	**23**

at State Farm Stadium, Glendale, Arizona

- Date: September 27
- Game time: 4:25 p.m. EDT/1:25 p.m. MST
- Game weather: None (retractable roof stadium with roof closed)
- Game attendance: 0
- Referee: Scott Novak
- TV announcers (Fox): Dick Stockton, Brady Quinn and Sara Walsh
- Recap, Game Book

Game information

**First quarter**

- DET – Matt Prater 37-yard field goal, 8:27. Lions 3–0. **Drive: 11 plays, 56 yards, 6:33.**
- ARI – Andy Isabella 13-yard pass from Kyler Murray (Zane Gonzalez kick), 0:14. Cardinals 7–3. **Drive: 9 plays, 80 yards, 4:08.**

**Second quarter**

- DET – Jesse James 5-yard pass from Matthew Stafford (Matt Prater kick), 6:15. Lions 10–7. **Drive: 6 plays, 27 yards, 3:22.**
- ARI – Kyler Murray 1-yard run (Zane Gonzalez kick failed), 1:53. Cardinals 13–10. **Drive: 9 plays, 74 yards, 4:22.**
- DET – Kenny Golladay 15-yard pass from Matthew Stafford (Matt Prater kick), 0:31. Lions 17–13. **Drive: 6 plays, 75 yards, 1:02.**

**Third quarter**

- ARI – Zane Gonzalez 54-yard field goal, 11:19. Lions 17–16. **Drive: 7 plays, 39 yards, 3:41.**
- DET – Matt Prater 24-yard field goal, 5:27. Lions 20–16. **Drive: 6 plays, 16 yards, 2:09.**
- ARI – Andy Isabella 4-yard pass from Kyler Murray (Zane Gonzalez kick), 0:35. Cardinals 23–20. **Drive: 11 plays, 75 yards, 4:52.**

**Fourth quarter**

- DET – Matt Prater 35-yard field goal, 6:44. Tied 23–23. **Drive: 8 plays, 19 yards, 4:19.**
- DET – Matt Prater 39-yard field goal, 0:00. Lions 26–23. **Drive: 10 plays, 70 yards, 4:49.**

**Top passers**

- DET – Matthew Stafford – 22/31, 270 yards, 2 TD
- ARI – Kyler Murray – 23/35, 270 yards, 2 TD, 3 INT

**Top rushers**

- DET – Adrian Peterson – 22 rushes, 75 yards
- ARI – Kenyan Drake – 18 rushes, 73 yards

**Top receivers**

- DET – Kenny Golladay – 6 receptions, 57 yards, TD
- ARI – DeAndre Hopkins – 10 receptions, 137 yards

In week 3, the Lions visited the 2–0 Arizona Cardinals. The Lions opened the scoring in the first quarter via a 37-yard field goal by Matt Prater. The Cardinals responded with a 13-yard touchdown pass from Kyler Murray to Andy Isabella. The Lions took the lead in the second quarter via a five-yard touchdown pass from Matthew Stafford to Jesse James. The Cardinals responded with a one-yard touchdown run from Murray followed by a failed point-after conversion to take a 13–10 lead. The Lions closed the quarter with a 15-yard touchdown pass from Stafford to Kenny Golladay, making the score 17–13 in favor of Detroit at half-time. The teams exchanged field goals in the third quarter, first a 54-yard field goal by Zane Gonzalez, then a 24-yard field goal by Prater. The Cardinals responded with a four-yard touchdown pass from Murray to Isabella to regain the lead, 23–20. Prater kicked two field goals in the final quarter: first one from 35 yards to tie the game, then one from 39 yards as time expired, making the final score 26–23 in favor of Detroit. With the win, the Lions snapped an 11-game losing streak dating back to week 8 of last season.

==== Week 4: vs. New Orleans Saints ====
Week 4: New Orleans Saints at Detroit Lions – Game summary

Quarter	1	2	3	4	Total
**Saints**	7	21	7	0	**35**
Lions	14	0	7	8	**29**

at Ford Field, Detroit, Michigan

- Date: October 4
- Game time: 1:00 p.m. EDT
- Game weather: None (indoor stadium)
- Game attendance: 0
- Referee: Shawn Smith
- TV announcers (Fox): Kenny Albert, Jonathan Vilma and Shannon Spake
- Recap, Game Book

Game information

**First quarter**

- DET – D'Andre Swift 7-yard pass from Matthew Stafford (Matt Prater kick), 11:58. Lions 7–0. **Drive: 8 plays, 77 yards, 3:02.**
- DET – Kenny Golladay 15-yard pass from Matthew Stafford (Matt Prater kick), 10:23. Lions 14–0. **Drive: 3 plays, 18 yards, 1:21.**
- NO – Latavius Murray 3-yard run (Wil Lutz kick), 3:08. Lions 14–7. **Drive: 13 plays, 75 yards, 7:15.**

**Second quarter**

- NO – Alvin Kamara 1-yard run (Wil Lutz kick), 10:10. Tied 14–14. **Drive: 10 plays, 80 yards, 5:42.**
- NO – Tre'Quan Smith 2-yard pass from Drew Brees (Wil Lutz kick), 3:03. Saints 21–14. **Drive: 9 plays, 80 yards, 5:26.**
- NO – Tre'Quan Smith 20-yard pass from Drew Brees (Wil Lutz kick), 0:44. Saints 28–14. **Drive: 4 plays, 49 yards, 0:59.**

**Third quarter**

- NO – Latavius Murray 6-yard run (Wil Lutz kick), 8:52. Saints 35–14. **Drive: 10 plays, 75 yards, 6:08.**
- DET – T. J. Hockenson 1-yard pass from Matthew Stafford (Matt Prater kick), 4:19. Saints 35–21. **Drive: 11 plays, 75 yards, 4:33.**

**Fourth quarter**

- DET – Adrian Peterson 5-yard run (Matthew Stafford–T. J. Hockenson pass), 3:40. Saints 35–29. **Drive: 12 plays, 43 yards, 4:21.**

**Top passers**

- NO – Drew Brees – 19/25, 246 yards, 2 TD, INT
- DET – Matthew Stafford – 17/31, 206 yards, 3 TD, INT

**Top rushers**

- NO – Alvin Kamara – 19 rushes, 83 yards, TD
- DET – Adrian Peterson – 11 rushes, 36 yards, TD

**Top receivers**

- NO – Emmanuel Sanders – 6 receptions, 93 yards
- DET – Kenny Golladay – 4 receptions, 62 yards, TD

In week 4, the Lions hosted the New Orleans Saints. The Lions scored 14 points in the first quarter via a seven-yard touchdown pass from Matthew Stafford to D'Andre Swift, and a 15-yard touchdown pass from Stafford to Kenny Golladay. The Saints responded with a three-yard touchdown run from Latavius Murray. The Saints scored 21 points in the second quarter via a one-yard touchdown run from Alvin Kamara, and two touchdown passes from Drew Brees to Tre'Quan Smith, from two-yards and 20-yards, respectively, making the score 28–14 in favor of New Orleans at half-time. The Saints extended their lead in the third quarter via a six-yard touchdown run from Murray. The Lions responded with a one-yard touchdown pass from Stafford to T. J. Hockenson. The Lions scored the only points of the fourth quarter via a five-yard touchdown run from Adrian Peterson and a two-point conversion pass from Stafford to Hockenson, making the final score 35–29 in favor of New Orleans. They also dubiously have blown a double-digit lead in five consecutive losses dating back to last season.

==== Week 6: at Jacksonville Jaguars ====
Week 6: Detroit Lions at Jacksonville Jaguars – Game summary

Quarter	1	2	3	4	Total
**Lions**	7	10	7	10	**34**
Jaguars	3	0	7	6	**16**

at TIAA Bank Field, Jacksonville, Florida

- Date: October 18
- Game time: 1:00 p.m. EDT
- Game weather: 78 °F (26 °C), cloudy
- Game attendance: 14,513
- Referee: Shawn Hochuli
- TV announcers (Fox): Chris Myers, Greg Jennings, Brock Huard and Jen Hale
- Recap, Game Book

Game information

**First quarter**

- DET – Adrian Peterson 1-yard run (Matt Prater kick), 7:37. Lions 7–0. **Drive: 10 plays, 50 yards, 5:09.**
- JAX – Jon Brown 31-yard field goal, 1:51. Lions 7–3. **Drive: 11 plays, 62 yards, 5:46.**

**Second quarter**

- DET – D'Andre Swift 1-yard run (Matt Prater kick), 13:41. Lions 14–3. **Drive: 6 plays, 75 yards, 3:10.**
- DET – Matt Prater 31-yard field goal, 1:53. Lions 17–3. **Drive: 11 plays, 65 yards, 6:09.**

**Third quarter**

- DET – T. J. Hockenson 1-yard pass from Matthew Stafford (Matt Prater kick), 7:44. Lions 24–3. **Drive: 9 plays, 86 yards, 3:56.**
- JAX – Gardner Minshew 6-yard run (Jon Brown kick), 3:31. Lions 24–10. **Drive: 8 plays, 74 yards, 4:13.**

**Fourth quarter**

- DET – D'Andre Swift 6-yard run (Matt Prater kick), 13:32. Lions 31–10. **Drive: 9 plays, 75 yards, 4:59.**
- DET – Matt Prater 41-yard field goal, 8:11. Lions 34–10. **Drive: 8 plays, 41 yards, 4:14.**
- JAX – James Robinson 14-yard pass from Gardner Minshew (pass failed), 5:18. Lions 34–16. **Drive: 9 plays, 80 yards, 2:53.**

**Top passers**

- DET – Matthew Stafford – 19/31, 223 yards, TD, INT
- JAX – Gardner Minshew – 25/44, 243 yards, TD, INT

**Top rushers**

- DET – D'Andre Swift – 14 rushes, 116 yards, 2 TD
- JAX – James Robinson – 12 rushes, 29 yards

**Top receivers**

- DET – Kenny Golladay – 4 receptions, 105 yards
- JAX – Keelan Cole – 6 receptions, 143 yards

Following their bye week, in week 6, the Lions visited the Jacksonville Jaguars. The Lions opened the scoring in the first quarter via a one-yard touchdown run from Adrian Peterson. The Jaguars responded with a 31-yard field goal by Jon Brown. The Lions scored 10 points in the second quarter via a one-yard touchdown run from D'Andre Swift and a 31-yard field goal by Matt Prater, making the score 17–3 in favor of Detroit at half-time. The Lions extended their lead in the third quarter via a one-yard touchdown pass from Matthew Stafford to T. J. Hockenson. The Jaguars responded with a six-yard touchdown run from Gardner Minshew. The Lions scored 10 points in the fourth quarter via a six-yard touchdown run from Swift and a 41-yard field goal by Prater. The Jaguars responded with a 14-yard touchdown pass from Minshew to James Robinson, making the final score 34–16 in favor of Detroit. Swift became the first rookie running back for the Lions to run for 100-plus yards and score two touchdowns in a game since Barry Sanders in 1989. Stafford has now thrown a touchdown pass against every NFL team (except his own).

==== Week 7: at Atlanta Falcons ====
Week 7: Detroit Lions at Atlanta Falcons – Game summary

Quarter	1	2	3	4	Total
**Lions**	7	3	3	10	**23**
Falcons	0	14	0	8	**22**

at Mercedes-Benz Stadium, Atlanta, Georgia

- Date: October 25
- Game time: 1:00 p.m. EDT
- Game weather: 71 °F (22 °C), cloudy (retractable roof open)
- Game attendance: 7,796
- Referee: Land Clark
- TV announcers (Fox): Chris Myers, Brock Huard, Greg Jennings, and Jen Hale
- Recap, Game Book

Game information

**First quarter**

- DET – D'Andre Swift 3-yard run (Matt Prater kick), 4:16. Lions 7–0. **Drive: 9 plays, 71 yards, 4:39.**

**Second quarter**

- ATL – Todd Gurley 1-yard run (Younghoe Koo kick), 10:55. Tied 7–7. **Drive: 13 plays, 89 yards, 3:10.**
- ATL – Calvin Ridley 4-yard pass from Matt Ryan (Younghoe Koo kick), 0:29. Falcons 14–7. **Drive: 14 plays, 98 yards, 5:48.**
- DET – Matt Prater 50-yard field goal, 0:00. Falcons 14–10. **Drive: 5 plays, 43 yards, 0:29.**

**Third quarter**

- DET – Matt Prater 51-yard field goal, 7:34. Falcons 14–13. **Drive: 11 plays, 53 yards, 7:26.**

**Fourth quarter**

- DET – Matt Prater 49-yard field goal, 3:16. Lions 16–14. **Drive: 4 plays, 1 yard, 2:13.**
- ATL – Todd Gurley 10-yard run (Calvin Ridley pass from Matt Ryan), 1:04. Falcons 22–16. **Drive: 9 plays, 76 yards, 2:12.**
- DET – T. J. Hockenson 11-yard pass from Matthew Stafford (Matt Prater kick), 0:00. Lions 23–22. **Drive: 8 plays, 75 yards, 1:04.**

**Top passers**

- DET – Matthew Stafford – 25/36, 340 yards, TD
- ATL – Matt Ryan – 31/42, 338 yards, TD

**Top rushers**

- DET – Adrian Peterson – 11 rushes, 29 yards
- ATL – Todd Gurley – 23 rushes, 63 yards, 2 TD

**Top receivers**

- DET – Kenny Golladay – 6 receptions, 114 yards
- ATL – Julio Jones – 8 receptions, 97 yards

In week 7, the Lions visited the Atlanta Falcons. The Lions opened the scoring in the first quarter via a three-yard touchdown run from D'Andre Swift. The Falcons added 14 points in the second quarter via a one-yard touchdown run from Todd Gurley and a four-yard touchdown pass from Matt Ryan to Calvin Ridley. The Lions responded with a 50-yard field goal by Matt Prater, making the score 14–10 in favor of Atlanta at half-time. The Lions scored the only points of the third quarter via a 51-yard field goal by Prater. In the fourth quarter, the Lions regained the lead via a 49-yard field goal by Prater. The Falcons made it all the way to the Detroit red zone and threatened to kick a game-winning field goal. However, Falcons running back Todd Gurley accidentally scored a touchdown, leaving over a minute for the Lions to respond. The Lions ended up scoring a walk-off touchdown from Matthew Stafford to T. J. Hockenson, with the help of a long PAT from Matt Prater, to win it 23–22.

==== Week 8: vs. Indianapolis Colts ====
Week 8: Indianapolis Colts at Detroit Lions – Game summary

Quarter	1	2	3	4	Total
**Colts**	0	20	0	21	**41**
Lions	7	0	7	7	**21**

at Ford Field, Detroit, Michigan

- Date: November 1
- Game time: 1:00 p.m. EST
- Game weather: None (indoor stadium)
- Game attendance: 0
- Referee: Clay Martin
- TV announcers (CBS): Andrew Catalon, James Lofton and Michael Grady
- Recap, Game Book

Game information

**First quarter**

- DET – Marvin Jones 25-yard pass from Matthew Stafford (Matt Prater kick), 5:42. Lions 7–0. **Drive: 2 plays, 32 yards, 0:37.**

**Second quarter**

- IND – Nyheim Hines 22-yard pass from Philip Rivers (Rodrigo Blankenship kick), 11:10. Tied 7–7. **Drive: 4 plays, 61 yards, 2:13.**
- IND – Jack Doyle 7-yard pass from Philip Rivers (Rodrigo Blankenship kick), 5:32. Colts 14–7. **Drive: 10 plays, 73 yards, 3:49.**
- IND – Nyheim Hines 29-yard pass from Philip Rivers (kick failed), 0:56. Colts 20–7. **Drive: 6 plays, 48 yards, 2:50.**

**Third quarter**

- DET – Kerryon Johnson 9-yard pass from Matthew Stafford (Matt Prater kick), 11:08. Colts 20–14. **Drive: 8 plays, 68 yards, 3:52.**

**Fourth quarter**

- IND – Jordan Wilkins 1-yard run (Jordan Wilkins run), 13:34. Colts 28–14. **Drive: 8 plays, 60 yards, 3:53.**
- IND – Kenny Moore II 29-yard interception return (Rodrigo Blankenship kick), 13:26. Colts 35–14.
- DET – Marvin Jones 4-yard pass from Matthew Stafford (Matt Prater kick), 12:15. Colts 35–21. **Drive: 4 plays, 75 yards, 1:11.**
- IND – Trey Burton 2-yard run (Rodrigo Blankenship kick), 7:01. Colts 41–21. **Drive: 12 plays, 73 yards, 5:14.**

**Top passers**

- IND – Philip Rivers – 23/33, 262 yards, 3 TD
- DET – Matthew Stafford – 24/42, 336 yards, 3 TD, INT

**Top rushers**

- IND – Jordan Wilkins – 20 rushes, 89 yards, TD
- DET – Jamal Agnew – 1 rush, 11 yards

**Top receivers**

- IND – Nyheim Hines – 3 receptions, 54 yards, 2 TD
- DET – Marvin Hall – 4 receptions, 113 yards

In week 8, the Lions hosted the Indianapolis Colts. The Lions opened the scoring in the first quarter via a 25-yard touchdown pass from Matthew Stafford to Marvin Jones. The Colts scored 20 points in the second quarter via a 22-yard touchdown pass from Philip Rivers to Nyheim Hines, a seven-yard touchdown pass from Rivers to Jack Doyle, and a 29-yard touchdown pass from Rivers to Hines, making the score 20–7 in favor of Indianapolis at half-time. The Lions scored the only points of the third quarter via a nine-yard touchdown pass from Stafford to Kerryon Johnson. The Colts scored 21 points in the fourth quarter via a one-yard touchdown run from Jordan Wilkins, and two-point conversion run by Wilkins, a 29-yard interception return by Kenny Moore II, and a two-yard touchdown run from Trey Burton. The Lions responded with a four-yard touchdown pass from Stafford to Jones, making the final score 41–21 in favor of Indianapolis.

==== Week 9: at Minnesota Vikings ====
Week 9: Detroit Lions at Minnesota Vikings – Game summary

Quarter	1	2	3	4	Total
Lions	0	10	0	10	**20**
**Vikings**	13	7	7	7	**34**

at U.S. Bank Stadium, Minneapolis, Minnesota

- Date: November 8
- Game time: 1:00 p.m. EST/12:00 p.m. CST
- Game weather: None (indoor stadium)
- Game attendance: 0
- Referee: Clete Blakeman
- TV announcers (CBS): Kevin Harlan, Trent Green and Melanie Collins
- Recap, Game Book

Game information

**First quarter**

- MIN – Dalvin Cook 5-yard run (Dan Bailey kick), 10:39. Vikings 7–0. **Drive: 5 plays, 67 yards, 2:32.**
- MIN – Irv Smith Jr. 9-yard pass from Kirk Cousins (kick failed), 1:26. Vikings 13–0. **Drive: 5 plays, 64 yards, 2:41.**

**Second quarter**

- DET – Matt Prater 23-yard field goal, 8:21. Vikings 13–3. **Drive: 15 plays, 70 yards, 8:05.**
- DET – Marvin Jones 15-yard pass from Matthew Stafford (Matt Prater kick), 1:19. Vikings 13–10. **Drive: 4 plays, 75 yards, 1:11.**
- MIN – Ameer Abdullah 22-yard pass from Kirk Cousins (Dan Bailey kick), 0:15. Vikings 20–10. **Drive: 6 plays, 87 yards, 1:04.**

**Third quarter**

- MIN – Irv Smith Jr. 1-yard pass from Kirk Cousins (Dan Bailey kick), 7:50. Vikings 27–10. **Drive: 9 plays, 77 yards, 4:09.**

**Fourth quarter**

- DET – Matt Prater 45-yard field goal, 11:02. Vikings 27–13. **Drive: 8 plays, 42 yards, 3:33.**
- MIN – Dalvin Cook 70-yard run (Dan Bailey kick), 10:42. Vikings 34–13. **Drive: 1 play, 70 yards, 0:20.**
- DET – T. J. Hockenson 2-yard pass from Chase Daniel (Matt Prater kick), 6:55. Vikings 34–20. **Drive: 1 play, 2 yards, 0:03.**

**Top passers**

- DET – Matthew Stafford – 23/32, 211 yards, TD, 2 INT
- MIN – Kirk Cousins – 13/20, 220 yards, 3 TD

**Top rushers**

- DET – D'Andre Swift – 13 rushes, 64 yards
- MIN – Dalvin Cook – 22 rushes, 206 yards, 2 TD

**Top receivers**

- DET – Danny Amendola – 7 receptions, 77 yards
- MIN – Justin Jefferson – 3 receptions, 64 yards

In week 9, the Lions visited their divisional rival, the Minnesota Vikings. The Vikings scored 13 points in the first quarter via a five-yard touchdown run from Dalvin Cook and a nine-yard touchdown pass from Kirk Cousins to Irv Smith Jr. (This marked the first game of the 2020 season in which the Lions did not score first.) The Lions scored ten points in the second quarter via a 23-yard field goal by Matt Prater and a 15-yard touchdown pass from Matthew Stafford to Marvin Jones. The Vikings responded with a 22-yard touchdown pass from Cousins to Ameer Abdullah, making the score 20–10 in favor of Minnesota at half-time. The Vikings scored the only points of the third quarter via a one-yard touchdown pass from Cousins to Smith Jr. The Lions attempted comeback failed with interceptions on consecutive possessions in the third quarter. Stafford exited the game in the fourth quarter due to concussion protocol. The Lions scored 10 points in the fourth quarter via a 45-yard field goal by Prater and a two-yard touchdown pass from Chase Daniel to T. J. Hockenson. The Vikings responded with a 70-yard touchdown run from Cook, making the final score 34–20 in favor of Minnesota.

==== Week 10: vs. Washington Football Team ====
Week 10: Washington Football Team at Detroit Lions – Game summary

Quarter	1	2	3	4	Total
Washington	3	0	7	17	**27**
**Lions**	7	10	7	6	**30**

at Ford Field, Detroit, Michigan

- Date: November 15
- Game time: 1:00 p.m. EST
- Game weather: None (indoor stadium)
- Game attendance: 0
- Referee: Alex Kemp
- TV announcers (Fox): Dan Hellie, Aqib Talib and Megan Olivi
- Recap, Game Book

Game information

**First quarter**

- DET - Marvin Hall 55-yard pass from Matthew Stafford (Matt Prater kick), 7:12. Lions 7–0. **Drive: 5 plays, 92 yards, 1:52.**
- WAS – Dustin Hopkins 38-yard field goal, 3:25. Lions 7–3. **Drive: 9 plays, 54 yards, 3:47.**

**Second quarter**

- DET – Marvin Jones 27-yard pass from Matthew Stafford (Matt Prater kick), 11:55. Lions 14–3. **Drive: 6 plays, 53 yards, 2:07.**
- DET – Matt Prater 53-yard field goal, 0:08. Lions 17–3. **Drive: 7 plays, 34 yards, 1:06.**

**Third quarter**

- DET – D'Andre Swift 15-yard pass from Matthew Stafford (Matt Prater kick), 7:58. Lions 24–3. **Drive: 11 plays, 75 yards, 7:02.**
- WAS – J. D. McKissic 2-yard run (Dustin Hopkins kick), 2:30. Lions 24–10. **Drive: 11 plays, 82 yards, 5:28.**

**Fourth quarter**

- WAS – Antonio Gibson 2-yard run (Dustin Hopkins kick), 11:21. Lions 24–17. **Drive: 11 plays, 84 yards, 4:39.**
- WAS – Antonio Gibson 5-yard run (Dustin Hopkins kick), 6:09. Tied 24–24. **Drive: 6 plays, 66 yards, 2:44.**
- DET – Matt Prater 37-yard field goal, 2:37. Lions 27–24. **Drive: 11 plays, 56 yards, 3:32.**
- WAS – Dustin Hopkins 41-yard field goal, 0:16. Tied 27–27. **Drive: 17 plays, 66 yards, 2:21.**
- DET – Matt Prater 59-yard field goal, 0:00. Lions 30–27. **Drive: 3 plays, 34 yards, 0:16.**

**Top passers**

- WAS – Alex Smith – 38/55, 390 yards
- DET – Matthew Stafford – 24/33, 276 yards, 3 TD

**Top rushers**

- WAS – Antonio Gibson – 13 rushes, 45 yards, 2 TD
- DET – D'Andre Swift – 16 rushes, 81 yards

**Top receivers**

- WAS – Terry McLaurin – 7 receptions, 95 yards
- DET – Marvin Jones – 8 receptions, 96 yards, TD

In week 10, the Lions hosted the Washington Football Team. Detroit opened the scoring in the first quarter via a 55-yard touchdown pass from Matthew Stafford to Marvin Hall. Washington responded with a 38-yard field goal by Dustin Hopkins, their only points of the first half. Detroit added 10 points in the second quarter, via a 27-yard touchdown pass from Stafford to Marvin Jones and a 53-yard field goal by Matt Prater, making the score 17–3 in favor of Detroit at half-time. The teams exchanged touchdowns in the third quarter, first a 15-yard touchdown pass from Stafford to D'Andre Swift for Detroit, then a two-yard touchdown run from J. D. McKissic for Washington. In the fourth quarter, Washington's Antonio Gibson scored back-to-back touchdowns, from two and five-yards, respectively, to tie the score at 24 points. Detroit responded with a 37-yard field goal by Prater to regain the lead. Washington responded with a 41-yard field goal by Hopkins, to tie the score again at 27 points each. Detroit responded with a 59-yard game-winning field goal by Prater as time expired, making the final score 30–27 in favor of Detroit, for their first home win of the season.

This was also Matthew Stafford’s final home win as Detroit Lion.

==== Week 11: at Carolina Panthers ====
Week 11: Detroit Lions at Carolina Panthers – Game summary

Quarter	1	2	3	4	Total
Lions	0	0	0	0	**0**
**Panthers**	7	0	10	3	**20**

at Bank of America Stadium, Charlotte, North Carolina

- Date: November 22
- Game time: 1:00 p.m. EST
- Game weather: Cloudy, 65 °F (18 °C)
- Game attendance: 5,546
- Referee: Ronald Torbert
- TV announcers (Fox): Kevin Kugler, Chris Spielman and Laura Okmin
- Recap, Game Book

Game information

**First quarter**

- CAR - Mike Davis 1-yard run (Joey Slye kick), 2:21. Panthers 7–0. **Drive: 10 plays, 95 yards, 6:03.**

**Second quarter**

- No scoring plays.

**Third quarter**

- CAR – Curtis Samuel 17-yard pass from P. J. Walker (Joey Slye kick), 11:06. Panthers 14–0. **Drive: 6 plays, 66 yards, 3:09.**
- CAR – Joey Slye 56-yard field goal, 2:04. Panthers 17–0. **Drive: 9 plays, 37 yards, 5:33.**

**Fourth quarter**

- CAR – Joey Slye 37-yard field goal, 5:00. Panthers 20–0. **Drive: 5 plays, 3 yards, 1:20.**

**Top passers**

- DET – Matthew Stafford – 18/33, 178 yards
- CAR – P. J. Walker – 24/34, 258 yards, TD, 2 INT

**Top rushers**

- DET – Adrian Peterson – 7 rushes, 18 yards
- CAR – Mike Davis – 19 rushes, 64 yards, TD

**Top receivers**

- DET – T. J. Hockenson – 4 receptions, 69 yards
- CAR – D. J. Moore – 7 receptions, 127 yards

In week 11, the Lions visited the Carolina Panthers. The Panthers opened the scoring in the first quarter via a one-yard touchdown run from Mike Davis. After a scoreless second quarter, the Panthers added 10 points in the third quarter via a 17-yard touchdown pass from P. J. Walker to Curtis Samuel and a 58-yard field goal by Joey Slye. The Panthers extended their lead in the fourth quarter via a 37-yard field goal by Slye, making the final score 20–0 in favor of Carolina. The Lions were shut out for the first time since week 6 of 2009.

==== Week 12: vs. Houston Texans ====
Week 12: Houston Texans at Detroit Lions – Game summary

Quarter	1	2	3	4	Total
**Texans**	13	10	3	15	**41**
Lions	7	7	3	8	**25**

at Ford Field, Detroit, Michigan

- Date: November 26
- Game time: 12:30 p.m. EST
- Game weather: None (indoor stadium)
- Game attendance: 0
- Referee: Shawn Smith
- TV announcers (CBS): Jim Nantz, Tony Romo, and Tracy Wolfson
- Recap, Game Book

Game information

**First quarter**

- DET – Adrian Peterson 1-yard run (Matt Prater kick), 6:54. Lions 7–0. **Drive: 7 plays, 85 yards, 4:16.**
- HOU – J. J. Watt 19-yard interception return, 4:38. Lions 7–6. **Drive: 1 play, 0 yards, 0:07.**
- HOU – C. J. Prosise 2-yard pass from Deshaun Watson (Kaʻimi Fairbairn kick), 2:58. Texans 13–7. **Drive: 3 plays, 30 yards, 1:26.**

**Second quarter**

- DET – Adrian Peterson 1-yard run (Matt Prater kick), 12:56. Lions 14–13. **Drive: 4 plays, 26 yards, 1:54.**
- HOU – Duke Johnson 33-yard pass from Deshaun Watson (Kaʻimi Fairbairn kick), 10:18. Texans 20–14. **Drive: 5 plays, 60 yards, 2:38.**
- HOU – Kaʻimi Fairbairn 42-yard field goal, 1:44. Texans 23–14. **Drive: 9 plays, 57 yards, 4:31.**

**Third quarter**

- DET – Matt Prater 29-yard field goal, 7:24. Texans 23–17. **Drive: 14 plays, 68 yards, 7:36.**
- HOU – Kaʻimi Fairbairn 26-yard field goal, 3:10. Texans 26–17. **Drive: 9 plays, 67 yards, 4:14.**

**Fourth quarter**

- HOU – Will Fuller 40-yard pass from Deshaun Watson (Deshaun Watson–Keke Coutee pass), 12:09. Texans 34–17. **Drive: 6 plays, 85 yards, 2:51.**
- HOU – Will Fuller 34-yard pass from Deshaun Watson (Kaʻimi Fairbairn kick), 10:07. Texans 41–17. **Drive: 1 play, 34 yards, 0:10.**
- DET – Mohamed Sanu 14-yard pass from Matthew Stafford (Matthew Stafford–Mohamed Sanu pass), 6:32. Texans 41–25. **Drive: 12 plays, 75 yards, 3:35.**

**Top passers**

- HOU – Deshaun Watson – 17/25, 318 yards, 4 TD
- DET – Matthew Stafford – 28/42, 295 yards, TD, INT

**Top rushers**

- HOU – Duke Johnson – 9 rushes, 37 yards
- DET – Adrian Peterson – 15 rushes, 55 yards, 2 TD

**Top receivers**

- HOU – Will Fuller – 6 receptions, 171 yards, 2 TD
- DET – T. J. Hockenson – 5 receptions, 89 yards

For their annual Thanksgiving Day game, the Lions donned throwback uniforms and hosted the Houston Texans. The Lions opened the scoring in the first quarter via a one-yard touchdown run from Adrian Peterson. The Texans responded with a 19-yard interception return by J. J. Watt and a two-yard touchdown pass from Deshaun Watson to C. J. Prosise. In the second quarter, Detroit regained the lead via a one-yard touchdown run from Peterson. Houston responded with 10 points via a 33-yard touchdown pass from Watson to Duke Johnson and a 42-yard field goal by Kaʻimi Fairbairn, making the score 23–14 in favor of Houston at half-time. In the third quarter, the teams exchanged field goals, first a 29-yarder by Matt Prater for Detroit, then a 26-yarder by Fairbairn for Houston. In the fourth quarter, Will Fuller of the Texans scored back-to-back touchdown receptions, from 40 and 34 yards, respectively. Detroit scored the game's final points via a 14-yard touchdown pass from Matthew Stafford to Mohamed Sanu and a two-point conversion pass from Stafford to Sanu, making the final score 41–25 in favor of the Texans. With the loss, the Lions fell to 4–7 and lost their fourth consecutive Thanksgiving Day game. Two days after the game, both head coach Matt Patricia and general manager Bob Quinn were fired by the Lions.

==== Week 13: at Chicago Bears ====
Week 13: Detroit Lions at Chicago Bears – Game summary

Quarter	1	2	3	4	Total
**Lions**	6	7	7	14	**34**
Bears	9	14	0	7	**30**

at Soldier Field, Chicago, Illinois

- Date: December 6
- Game time: 1:00 p.m. EST/12:00 p.m. CST
- Game weather: Cloudy, 35 °F (2 °C)
- Game attendance: 0
- Referee: Clay Martin
- TV announcers (Fox): Kevin Kugler, Chris Spielman, and Laura Okmin
- Recap, Game Book

Game information

**First quarter**

- CHI – Cairo Santos 45-yard field goal, 12:37. Bears 3–0. **Drive: 6 plays, 27 yards, 2:23.**
- CHI – David Montgomery 13-yard run (Cairo Santos kick blocked), 6:13. Bears 9–0. **Drive: 6 plays, 71 yards, 3:16.**
- DET – Adrian Peterson 3-yard run (Matt Prater kick failed), 0:15. Bears 9–6. **Drive: 12 plays, 72 yards, 5:58.**

**Second quarter**

- CHI – Cordarrelle Patterson 5-yard run (Cairo Santos kick), 10:10. Bears 16–6. **Drive: 10 plays, 75 yards, 5:05.**
- DET – Quintez Cephus 49-yard pass from Matthew Stafford (Matt Prater kick), 2:22. Bears 16–13. **Drive: 4 plays, 72 yards, 1:58.**
- CHI – David Montgomery 4-yard run (Cairo Santos kick), 0:36. Bears 23–13. **Drive: 6 plays, 68 yards, 1:46.**

**Third quarter**

- DET – Jesse James 9-yard pass from Matthew Stafford (Matt Prater kick), 3:55. Bears 23–20. **Drive: 10 plays, 66 yards, 5:07.**

**Fourth quarter**

- CHI – Cole Kmet 11-yard pass from Mitchell Trubisky (Cairo Santos kick), 11:23. Bears 30–20. **Drive: 12 plays, 72 yards, 7:32.**
- DET – Marvin Jones 25-yard pass from Matthew Stafford (Matt Prater kick), 2:18. Bears 30–27. **Drive: 7 plays, 96 yards, 2:15.**
- DET – Adrian Peterson 5-yard run (Matt Prater kick), 1:37. Lions 34–30. **Drive: 2 plays, 7 yards, 0:11.**

**Top passers**

- DET – Matthew Stafford – 27/42, 402 yards, 3 TD, INT
- CHI – Mitchell Trubisky – 26/34, 267 yards, TD

**Top rushers**

- DET – Adrian Peterson – 16 rushes, 57 yards, 2 TD
- CHI – David Montgomery – 17 rushes, 72 yards, 2 TD

**Top receivers**

- DET – Marvin Jones – 8 receptions, 116 yards, TD
- CHI – Allen Robinson – 6 receptions, 76 yards

In week 13, the Lions visited their divisional rivals, the Chicago Bears, for a rematch of week 1, in Darrell Bevell's debut as interim head coach. The Bears scored nine points in the first quarter via a 45-yard field goal by Cairo Santos and a 13-yard touchdown run from David Montgomery. The Lions responded with a three-yard touchdown run from Adrian Peterson. The teams exchanged touchdowns in the second quarter via a five-yard touchdown run from Cordarrelle Patterson for the Bears and a 49-yard touchdown pass from Matthew Stafford to Quintez Cephus for the Lions. The Bears extended their lead via a four-yard touchdown run from Montgomery, making the score 23–13 in favor of Chicago at half-time. The Lions scored the only points of the third quarter via a nine-yard touchdown pass from Stafford to Jesse James. The Bears extended their lead in the fourth quarter via an 11-yard touchdown pass from Mitchell Trubisky to Cole Kmet. The Lions responded with a 25-yard touchdown pass from Stafford to Marvin Jones. With under two minutes left in the game, Trubisky was sacked by Romeo Okwara at the Bears nine-yard line, causing a fumble that was recovered by Detroit's John Penisini. On the ensuing possession, the Lions scored via a five-yard touchdown run from Peterson. The Lions' defense held off the Bears on the next possession, making the final score 34–30 in favor of Detroit. With the win, the Lions snapped a five-game losing streak to the Bears dating back to week 11 of 2017.

This was their last win until week 13 of the 2021 season, 364 days later. This is also Matthew Stafford’s final win as Detroit Lion.

==== Week 14: vs. Green Bay Packers ====
Week 14: Green Bay at Detroit Lions – Game summary

Quarter	1	2	3	4	Total
**Packers**	7	7	7	10	**31**
Lions	7	7	0	10	**24**

at Ford Field, Detroit, Michigan

- Date: December 13
- Game time: 4:25 p.m. EST
- Game weather: None (indoor stadium)
- Game attendance: 0
- Referee: Alex Kemp
- TV announcers (Fox): Adam Amin, Mark Schlereth, and Lindsay Czarniak
- Recap, Game Book

Game information

**First quarter**

- DET – T. J. Hockenson 1-yard pass from Matthew Stafford (Matt Prater kick), 9:24. Lions 7–0. **Drive: 11 plays, 75 yards, 5:36.**
- GB – Davante Adams 58-yard pass from Aaron Rodgers (Mason Crosby kick), 8:00. Tied 7–7. **Drive: 3 plays, 75 yards, 1:24.**

**Second quarter**

- GB – Marquez Valdes-Scantling 14-yard pass from Aaron Rodgers (Mason Crosby kick), 14:11. Packers 14–7. **Drive: 12 plays, 69 yards, 7:01.**
- DET – D'Andre Swift 3-yard run (Matt Prater kick), 1:27. Tied 14–14. **Drive: 11 plays, 80 yards, 4:14.**

**Third quarter**

- GB – Aaron Rodgers 6-yard run (Mason Crosby kick), 6:11. Packers 21–14. **Drive: 14 plays, 75 yards, 8:49.**

**Fourth quarter**

- GB – Robert Tonyan 4-yard pass from Aaron Rodgers (Mason Crosby kick), 12:01. Packers 28–14. **Drive: 12 plays, 79 yards, 7:49.**
- DET – Kerryon Johnson 2-yard run (Matt Prater kick), 6:30. Packers 28–21. **Drive: 13 plays, 75 yards, 5:31.**
- GB – Mason Crosby 57-yard field goal, 3:30. Packers 31–21. **Drive: 7 plays, 36 yards, 3:00.**
- DET – Matt Prater 32-yard field goal, 1:49. Packers 31–24. **Drive: 7 plays, 19 yards, 1:41.**

**Top passers**

- GB – Aaron Rodgers – 26/33, 290 yards, 3 TD
- DET – Matthew Stafford – 24/34, 244 yards, TD

**Top rushers**

- GB – Aaron Jones – 15 rushes, 69 yards
- DET – D'Andre Swift – 7 rushes, 24 yards, TD

**Top receivers**

- GB – Davante Adams – 7 receptions, 115 yards, TD
- DET – Danny Amendola – 6 receptions, 66 yards

In week 14, the Lions hosted their divisional rivals, the Green Bay Packers, for a rematch of week 2. The Lions opened the scoring in the first quarter via a one-yard touchdown pass from Matthew Stafford to T. J. Hockenson. The Packers responded with a 56-yard touchdown pass from Aaron Rodgers to Davante Adams to tie the game. In the second quarter the Packers scored via a 14-yard touchdown pass from Rodgers to Marquez Valdes-Scantling, to take their first lead of the game. The Lions responded with a three-yard touchdown run from D'Andre Swift, tying the score at 14–14 at half-time. The Packers scored the only points of the third quarter via a six-yard touchdown run from Rodgers. The Packers extended their lead in the fourth quarter via a four-yard touchdown pass from Rodgers to Robert Tonyan. The Lions responded with a two-yard touchdown run from Kerryon Johnson. The teams then exchanged field goals, first a 57-yard field goal by Mason Crosby for the Packers, then a 32-yard field goal by Matt Prater for the Lions, making the final score 31–24 in favor of Green Bay.

==== Week 15: at Tennessee Titans ====
Week 15: Detroit Lions at Tennessee Titans – Game summary

Quarter	1	2	3	4	Total
Lions	7	8	3	7	**25**
**Titans**	14	10	0	22	**46**

at Nissan Stadium, Nashville, Tennessee

- Date: December 20
- Game time: 1:00 p.m. EST/12:00 p.m. CST
- Game weather: Cloudy, 46 °F (8 °C)
- Game attendance: 13,797
- Referee: Jerome Boger
- TV announcers (CBS): Spero Dedes and Adam Archuleta
- Recap, Game Book

Game information

**First quarter**

- TEN – Derrick Henry 3-yard run (Stephen Gostkowski kick), 8:40. Titans 7–0. **Drive: 12 plays, 75 yards, 6:20.**
- DET – Marvin Jones 2-yard pass from Matthew Stafford (Matt Prater kick), 7:06. Tied 7–7. **Drive: 14 plays, 75 yards, 7:06.**
- TEN – Corey Davis 75-yard pass from Ryan Tannehill (Stephen Gostkowski kick), 1:22. Titans 14–7. **Drive: 1 play, 75 yards, 0:12.**

**Second quarter**

- TEN – Ryan Tannehill 17-yard run (Stephen Gostkowski kick), 9:28. Titans 21–7. **Drive: 8 plays, 93 yards, 3:14.**
- DET – Romeo Okwara safety, 3:35. Titans 21–9. **Drive: 2 plays, -3 yards, 0:41.**
- DET – D'Andre Swift 2-yard run (Matt Prater kick), 1:02. Titans 21–15. **Drive: 5 plays, 55 yards, 2:29.**
- TEN – Stephen Gostkowski 38-yard field goal, 0:03. Titans 24–15. **Drive: 8 plays, 52 yards, 1:02.**

**Third quarter**

- DET – Matt Prater 53-yard field goal, 4:14. Titans 24–18. **Drive: 6 plays, 58 yards, 1:49.**

**Fourth quarter**

- TEN – Ryan Tannehill 3-yard run (Derrick Henry run), 14:30. Titans 32–18. **Drive: 9 plays, 83 yards, 4:39.**
- TEN – A. J. Brown 2-yard pass from Ryan Tannehill (Stephen Gostkowski kick), 9:00. Titans 39–18. **Drive: 6 plays, 34 yards, 3:02.**
- DET – D'Andre Swift 6-yard run (Matt Prater kick), 6:23. Titans 39–25. **Drive: 6 plays, 60 yards, 2:37.**
- TEN – Darrynton Evans 3-yard pass from Ryan Tannehill (Stephen Gostkowski kick), 2:07. Titans 46–25. **Drive: 10 plays, 45 yards, 4:16.**

**Top passers**

- DET – Matthew Stafford – 22/32, 252 yards, TD
- TEN – Ryan Tannehill – 21/27, 273 yards, 3 TD

**Top rushers**

- DET – D'Andre Swift – 15 rushes, 67 yards, 2 TD
- TEN – Derrick Henry – 24 rushes, 147 yards, TD

**Top receivers**

- DET – Marvin Jones – 10 receptions, 112, yards, TD
- TEN – Corey Davis – 4 receptions, 110 yards, TD

In week 15, the Lions visited the Tennessee Titans, who they had not beaten since 1995 when the latter was known as the Houston Oilers. The Titans opened the scoring in the first quarter via a three-yard touchdown run from Derrick Henry. The Lions responded with a two-yard touchdown pass from Matthew Stafford to Marvin Jones to tie the game. The Titans regained the lead via a 75-yard touchdown pass from Ryan Tannehill to Corey Davis. The Titans extended their lead in the second quarter via a 17-yard touchdown run from Tannehill. The Lions responded with nine points via a Romeo Okwara safety and a two-yard touchdown run from D'Andre Swift. The Titans responded with a 38-yard field goal by Stephen Gostkowski, making the score 24–15 in favor of Tennessee at half-time. The Lions scored the only points of the third quarter via a 53-yard field goal by Matt Prater. In the fourth quarter, the Titans extended their lead via a three-yard touchdown run from Tannehill and a two-point conversion run by Henry, and a two-yard touchdown pass from Tannehill to A. J. Brown. The Lions responded with a six-yard touchdown run from Swift. The Titans scored the final points of the game via a three-yard touchdown pass from Tannehill to Darrynton Evans, making the final score 46–25 in favor of Tennessee. With the loss, the Lions were eliminated from playoff contention.

==== Week 16: vs. Tampa Bay Buccaneers ====
Week 16: Tampa Bay Buccaneers at Detroit Lions – Game summary

Quarter	1	2	3	4	Total
**Buccaneers**	13	21	13	0	**47**
Lions	0	0	7	0	**7**

at Ford Field, Detroit, Michigan

- Date: December 26
- Game time: 1:00 p.m. EST
- Game weather: None (indoor stadium)
- Game attendance: 0
- Referee: Scott Novak
- TV announcers (NFLN): Adam Amin, Mark Schlereth and Lindsay Czarniak
- Recap, Game Book

Game information

**First quarter**

- TB – Rob Gronkowski 33-yard pass from Tom Brady (kick failed), 11:43. Buccaneers 6–0. **Drive: 6 plays, 82 yards, 3:17.**
- TB – Mike Evans 27-yard pass from Tom Brady (Ryan Succop kick), 7:39. Buccaneers 13–0. **Drive: 4 plays, 80 yards, 2:06.**

**Second quarter**

- TB – Leonard Fournette 4-yard run (Ryan Succop kick), 11:51. Buccaneers 20–0. **Drive: 6 plays, 51 yards, 2:24.**
- TB – Chris Godwin 7-yard pass from Tom Brady (Ryan Succop kick), 4:52. Buccaneers 27–0. **Drive: 7 plays, 91 yards, 4:10.**
- TB – Antonio Brown 12-yard pass from Tom Brady (Ryan Succop kick), 1:14. Buccaneers 34–0. **Drive: 9 plays, 66 yards, 2:06.**

**Third quarter**

- TB – Rob Gronkowski 25-yard pass from Blaine Gabbert (kick failed), 14:50. Buccaneers 40–0. **Drive: 1 play, 25 yards, 0:05.**
- DET – Jamal Agnew 74-yard punt return (Matt Prater kick), 9:20. Buccaneers 40–7. **Drive: 3 plays, 7 yards, 1:41.**
- TB – Mike Evans 22-yard pass from Blaine Gabbert (Ryan Succop kick), 7:07. Buccaneers 47–7. **Drive: 4 plays, 63 yards, 2:13.**

**Fourth quarter**

- No scoring plays.

**Top passers**

- TB – Tom Brady – 22/27, 348 yards, 4 TD
- DET – Chase Daniel – 13/18, 86 yards

**Top rushers**

- TB – Ke'Shawn Vaughn – 15 rushes, 62 yards
- DET – D'Andre Swift – 10 rushes, 45 yards

**Top receivers**

- TB – Mike Evans – 10 receptions, 181 yards, 2 TD
- DET – Danny Amendola – 5 receptions, 37 yards

In week 16, the Lions hosted the Tampa Bay Buccaneers. Several members of the Lions coaching staff had to quarantine per NFL rules due to COVID-19 contact tracing. Wide receivers coach Robert Prince filled in for interim head coach Darrell Bevell. The Buccaneers scored 34 unanswered points in the first half. They scored 13 points in the first quarter via a 33-yard touchdown pass from Tom Brady to Rob Gronkowski and a 27-yard touchdown pass from Brady to Mike Evans. The Buccaneers added 21 points in the second quarter, first via a four-yard touchdown run from Leonard Fournette, then touchdown passes from Brady to Chris Godwin and Antonio Brown, from seven and 12-yards, respectively, making the score 34–0 in favor of Tampa Bay at half-time. In the third quarter, the Buccaneers extended their lead via a 25 yard-touchdown pass from Blaine Gabbert to Gronkowski. The Lions finally got on the board via a 74-yard punt return by Jamal Agnew. The Buccaneers scored the game's final points via a 22-yard touchdown pass from Gabbert to Evans, making the final score 47–7 in favor of Tampa Bay.

==== Week 17: vs. Minnesota Vikings ====
Week 17: Minnesota Vikings at Detroit Lions – Game summary

Quarter	1	2	3	4	Total
**Vikings**	7	14	10	6	**37**
Lions	6	10	13	6	**35**

at Ford Field, Detroit, Michigan

- Date: January 3, 2021
- Game time: 1:00 p.m. EST
- Game weather: None (indoor stadium)
- Game attendance: 0
- Referee: Adrian Hill
- TV announcers (Fox): Joe Davis, Robert Smith and Kristina Pink
- Recap, Game Book

Game information

**First quarter**

- DET – Marvin Jones 43-yard pass from Matthew Stafford (kick failed), 4:45. Lions 6–0. **Drive: 7 plays, 90 yards, 3:36.**
- MIN – Alexander Mattison 28-yard pass from Kirk Cousins (Dan Bailey kick), 0:34. Vikings 7–6. **Drive: 8 plays, 70 yards, 4:11.**

**Second quarter**

- DET – Quintez Cephus 20-yard pass from Matthew Stafford (Matt Prater kick), 13:21. Lions 13–7. **Drive: 5 plays, 75 yards, 2:15.**
- MIN – Ameer Abdullah 4-yard pass from Kirk Cousins (Dan Bailey kick), 8:51. Vikings 14–13. **Drive: 8 plays, 79 yards, 4:28.**
- DET – Matt Prater 54-yard field goal, 7:17. Lions 16–14. **Drive: 5 plays, 39 yards, 1:38.**
- MIN – Chad Beebe 40-yard pass from Kirk Cousins (Dan Bailey kick), 0:04. Vikings 21–16. **Drive: 6 plays, 79 yards, 0:51.**

**Third quarter**

- DET – Marvin Jones 26-yard pass from Matthew Stafford (Matt Prater kick), 14:09. Lions 23–21. **Drive: 2 plays, 33 yards, 0:51.**
- MIN – Alexander Mattison 2-yard run (Dan Bailey kick), 11:35. Vikings 28–23. **Drive: 6 plays, 69 yards, 2:34.**
- MIN – Dan Bailey 23-yard field goal, 7:59. Vikings 31–23. **Drive: 6 plays, 19 yards, 1:46.**
- DET – Adrian Peterson 2-yard run (pass failed), 3:02. Vikings 31–29. **Drive: 10 plays, 75 yards, 4:53.**

**Fourth quarter**

- MIN – Kirk Cousins 1-yard run (kick failed), 10:32. Vikings 37–29. **Drive: 14 plays, 75 yards, 7:30.**
- DET – D'Andre Swift 2-yard run (pass failed), 4:26. Vikings 37–35. **Drive: 14 plays, 75 yards, 6:06.**

**Top passers**

- MIN – Kirk Cousins – 28/40, 405 yards, 3 TD
- DET – Matthew Stafford – 20/31, 293 yards, 3 TD, INT

**Top rushers**

- MIN – Alexander Mattison – 21 rushes, 95 yards, TD
- DET – Adrian Peterson – 7 rushes, 63 yards, TD

**Top receivers**

- MIN – Justin Jefferson – 9 receptions, 133 yards
- DET – Marvin Jones – 8 receptions, 180 yards, 2 TD

To finish the season, the Lions hosted their divisional rivals the Minnesota Vikings for a rematch of week 9. The Lions opened the scoring in the first quarter via a 43-yard touchdown pass from Matthew Stafford to Marvin Jones. The Vikings responded with a 28-yard touchdown pass from Kirk Cousins to Alexander Mattison. The teams exchanged touchdowns in the second quarter, via a 20-yard touchdown pass from Stafford to Quintez Cephus for the Lions, and a four-yard touchdown pass from Cousins to Ameer Abdullah for the Vikings. The Lions regained the lead via a 54-yard field goal by Matt Prater. The Vikings responded with a 40-yard touchdown pass from Cousins to Chad Beebe, making the score 21–16 in favor of Minnesota at half-time. The Lions regained the lead in the third quarter via a 26-yard touchdown pass from Stafford to Jones. The Vikings responded with 10 points via a two-yard touchdown run from Mattison and a 23-yard field goal by Dan Bailey. The Lions responded with a two-yard touchdown run from Adrian Peterson. The Vikings extended their lead in the fourth quarter via a one-yard touchdown run from Cousins. The Lions scored the final points of the game via a two-yard touchdown run from D'Andre Swift, making the final score 37–35 in favor of Minnesota. The Lions finished 5–11, and last place in the NFC North for the third consecutive season.

=== Standings ===
==== Division ====
NFC North
	W	L	T	PCT	DIV	CONF	PF	PA	STK
^{(1)} Green Bay Packers	13	3	0	.813	5–1	10–2	509	369	W6
^{(7)} Chicago Bears	8	8	0	.500	2–4	6–6	372	370	L1
Minnesota Vikings	7	9	0	.438	4–2	5–7	430	475	W1
Detroit Lions	5	11	0	.313	1–5	4–8	377	519	L4

==== Conference ====
NFC
#	Team	Division	W	L	T	PCT	DIV	CONF	SOS	SOV	STK
**Division leaders**
1	Green Bay Packers	North	13	3	0	.813	5–1	10–2	.428	.387	W6
2 (Note: New Orleans finished ahead of Seattle based on conference record.)	New Orleans Saints	South	12	4	0	.750	6–0	10–2	.459	.406	W2
3	Seattle Seahawks	West	12	4	0	.750	4–2	9–3	.447	.404	W4
4	Washington Football Team	East	7	9	0	.438	4–2	5–7	.459	.388	W1
**Wild cards**
5	Tampa Bay Buccaneers	South	11	5	0	.688	4–2	8–4	.488	.392	W4
6	Los Angeles Rams	West	10	6	0	.625	3–3	9–3	.494	.484	W1
7 (Note: Chicago finished and clinched the 7th and final playoff spot ahead of Arizona based on better win percentage in common games (against Detroit, the NY Giants, Carolina, and the LA Rams, Chicago finished 3–2, while Arizona finished 1–4).)	Chicago Bears	North	8	8	0	.500	2–4	6–6	.488	.336	L1
**Did not qualify for the postseason**
8	Arizona Cardinals	West	8	8	0	.500	2–4	6–6	.475	.441	L2
9	Minnesota Vikings	North	7	9	0	.438	4–2	5–7	.504	.366	W1
10 (Note: San Francisco finished ahead of the NY Giants based on head-to-head victory. Division tie break was initially used to eliminate Dallas (see below).)	San Francisco 49ers	West	6	10	0	.375	3–3	4–8	.549	.448	L1
11 (Note: NY Giants won tiebreaker over Dallas based on division record.)	New York Giants	East	6	10	0	.375	4–2	5–7	.502	.427	W1
12	Dallas Cowboys	East	6	10	0	.375	2–4	5–7	.471	.333	L1
13 (Note: Carolina finished ahead of Detroit based on head-to-head victory.)	Carolina Panthers	South	5	11	0	.313	1–5	4–8	.531	.388	L1
14	Detroit Lions	North	5	11	0	.313	1–5	4–8	.508	.350	L4
15	Philadelphia Eagles	East	4	11	1	.281	2–4	4–8	.537	.469	L3
16	Atlanta Falcons	South	4	12	0	.250	1–5	2–10	.551	.391	L5
**Tiebreakers** (Note: When breaking ties for three or more teams under the NFL's rules, they are first broken within divisions, then comparing only the highest-ranked remaining team from each division.)
