= List of Detroit Lions head coaches =

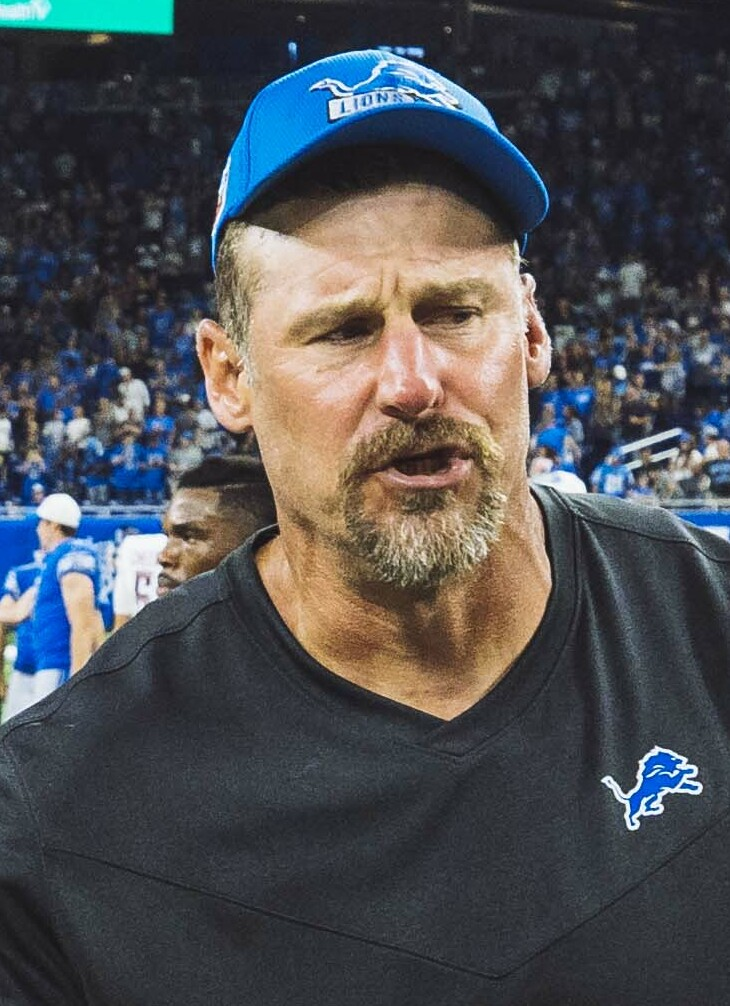
Dan Campbell is the current head coach of the Detroit Lions

The Detroit Lions are a professional American football team based in Detroit, Michigan. They are currently a member of the North Division of the National Football Conference (NFC) in the National Football League (NFL). The franchise has had 30 head coaches in team history, which includes its existence as the Portsmouth (Ohio) Spartans (1930–1933). In the 1934 NFL season, the franchise moved to Detroit and changed their name to the Lions.

George "Potsy" Clark is the only coach to have more than one tenure. Three coaches have won NFL championships with the team: Potsy Clark in 1935, Buddy Parker in 1952 and 1953, and George Wilson in 1957. Wayne Fontes is the all-time leader in games coached and wins, and Clark leads all coaches in winning percentage with .679 (with at least one full season coached). John Karcis is statistically the worst coach the Lions have had as he never won a game. Karcis is followed by Marty Mornhinweg with a winning percentage of .156. Of the 30 Lions coaches, two have been elected into the Pro Football Hall of Fame: Dutch Clark and Joe Schmidt. Gus Dorais was inducted in the College Football Hall of Fame as a coach in 1954. Several former players have been head coach for the Lions, including Dutch Edwards, Buddy Parker, Harry Gilmer, Joe Schmidt, Dick Jauron, and the current head coach Dan Campbell, who was hired on January 20, 2021.

== Coaches ==
Note: Statistics are accurate through Week 18 of the 2025 NFL season.

GC	Games coached
W	Wins
L	Losses
T	Ties
Win%	Win – Loss percentage
Div	Division titles
*	Elected to the Pro Football Hall of Fame
†	Spent entire professional head coaching career with the Lions

#	Image	Name	Term	Regular season					Division titles	Playoffs				Awards
#	Image	Name	Term	GC	W	L	T	Win%	Division titles	GC	W	L	Win%	Awards
Portsmouth Spartans
1		Hal Griffen†	1930	14	5	6	3	.464	0	–	–	–	–	
Portsmouth Spartans / Detroit Lions
2		George "Potsy" Clark (Note: Potsy Clark's full coaching record with the Lions is 85 regular season games coached with a record of 53–25–7 and a W–L percentage of .665. He is also 1–0 in 1 Playoff game.)	1931–1936	74	48	20	6	.689	1	1	1	0	1.000	
3		Earl "Dutch" Clark*	1937–1938	22	14	8	0	.636	0	–	–	–	–	
4		Gus Henderson†	1939	11	6	5	0	.545	0	–	–	–	–	
–		George "Potsy" Clark*	1940	11	5	5	1	.500	0	–	–	–	–	
5		Bill Edwards†	1941–1942	14	4	9	1	.321	0	–	–	–	–	
6		John Karcis†	1942	8	0	8	0	.000	0	–	–	–	–	
7		Gus Dorais†	1943–1947	53	20	31	2	.396	0	–	–	–	–	
8		Bo McMillin	1948–1950	36	12	24	0	.333	0	–	–	–	–	
9		Buddy Parker	1951–1956	72	47	23	2	.667	3	4	3	1	.750	UPI NFL Coach of the Year (1956)
10		George Wilson	1957–1964	104	53	45	6	.538	1	2	2	0	1.000	AP Coach of the Year (1957)
11		Harry Gilmer†	1965–1966	28	10	16	2	.393	0	–	–	–	–	
12		Joe Schmidt*	1967–1972	84	43	34	7	.554	0	1	0	1	.000	
13		Don McCafferty	1973	14	6	7	1	.464	0	–	–	–	–	
14		Rick Forzano†	1974–1976	32	15	17	0	.469	0	–	–	–	–	
15		Tommy Hudspeth†	1976–1977	24	11	13	0	.458	0	–	–	–	–	
16		Monte Clark	1978–1984	105	43	61	1	.414	1	2	0	2	.000	
17		Darryl Rogers†	1985–1988	58	18	40	0	.310	0	–	–	–	–	
18		Wayne Fontes†	1988–1996	133	66	67	0	.496	2	5	1	4	.200	AP Coach of the Year (1991); Pro Football Weekly Coach of the Year (1991); UPI NFC Coach of the Year (1991)
19		Bobby Ross	1997–2000	57	27	30	0	.474	0	2	0	2	.000	
20		Gary Moeller†	2000	7	4	3	0	.571	0	–	–	–	–	
21		Marty Mornhinweg†	2001–2002	32	5	27	0	.156	0	–	–	–	–	
22		Steve Mariucci	2003–2005	43	15	28	0	.349	0	–	–	–	–	
23		Dick Jauron	2005	5	1	4	0	.200	0	–	–	–	–	
24		Rod Marinelli†	2006–2008	48	10	38	0	.208	0	–	–	–	–	
25		Jim Schwartz†	2009–2013	80	29	51	0	.363	0	1	0	1	.000	
26		Jim Caldwell	2014–2017	64	36	28	0	.563	0	2	0	2	.000	
27		Matt Patricia†	2018–2020	43	13	29	1	.314	0	–	–	–	–	
28		Darrell Bevell	2020	4	1	3	0	.250	0	–	–	–	–	
29		Robert Prince†	2020	1	0	1	0	.000	0	–	–	–	–	
30		Dan Campbell	2021–present	94	55	38	1	.586	2	4	2	2	.500	
