= Arryn =

Arryn is a given name. Notable people with the name include:

- Arryn Siposs (born 1992), Australian dual-code football player
- Arryn Zech (fl. 2013), American voice actress

== See also ==
- House Arryn in the fantasy series A Song of Ice and Fire
- The Vale of Arryn in the fantasy series A Song of Ice and Fire
