= Jack Fox (American football) =

American football punter (born 1996)

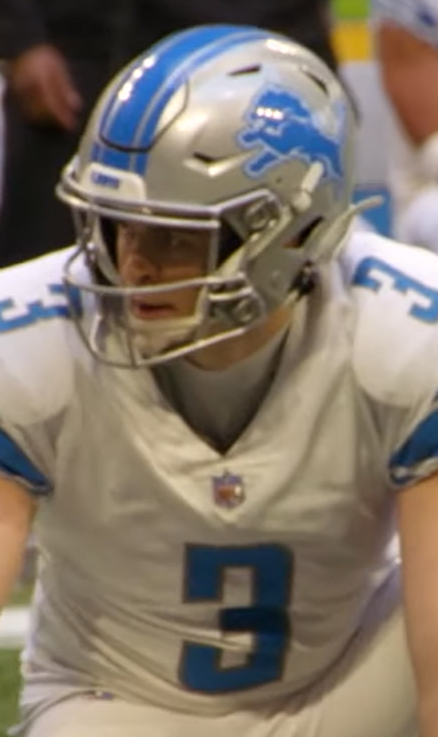
- Fox with the Detroit Lions in 2021

No. 3 – Detroit Lions
- Position: Punter
- Roster status: Active

Personal information
- Born: September 1, 1996 (age 30); Dallas, Texas, U.S.
- Listed height: 6 ft 2 in (1.88 m)
- Listed weight: 218 lb (99 kg)

Career information
- High school: Ladue Horton Watkins (Ladue, Missouri)
- College: Rice (2015–2018)
- NFL draft: 2019: undrafted

Career history
- Kansas City Chiefs (2019)*; Detroit Lions (2019–present)
- * Offseason or practice squad member only

Awards and highlights
- First-team All-Pro (2024); Second-team All-Pro (2020); 2× Pro Bowl (2020, 2024); C-USA Special Teams Player of the Year (2018); First-team All-C-USA (2018); Second-team All-C-USA (2017)

Career NFL statistics as of Week 10, 2026
- Punts: 364
- Punting yards: 17,600
- Punting average: 48.4
- Longest punt: 70
- Inside 20: 148
- Passing attempts: 6
- Passing completions: 5
- Completion percentage: 83.3%
- Passing yards: 72
- Passer rating: 116.7
- Stats at Pro Football Reference

John Edward Fox (born September 1, 1996) is an American professional football punter for the Detroit Lions of the National Football League (NFL). He played college football for the Rice Owls. Fox joined the Lions as a rookie in 2019, since earning two Pro Bowl and All-Pro selections; a first-team selection in 2024 and a second-team selection in 2020.

He is second in yards per punt in NFL history at (48.4) yards.

== Early life ==
Fox was born in Dallas, Texas and grew up in St. Louis, Missouri. He attended Ladue Horton Watkins High School, where he played baseball and football. As a senior, he was named first-team All-State as a punter and to the second-team as a placekicker while also passing for 1,900 yards and 18 touchdowns at quarterback.

== College career ==
Fox was both a kicker and punter for four seasons at Rice University. As a freshman he handled kickoffs and made 12 of 12 extra point attempts and one of two field goal attempts. He became the Owls punter going into his sophomore year and was named honorable mention All-Conference USA (C-USA) after punting 75 times for 3,051 yards (40.7 average) with two extra points and one field goal made. As a junior, Fox had 56 punts for 2,480 yards (44.3 average) with one extra point attempted and made and was named second-team All-C-USA. He also became the primary kicker for Rice as a senior and was named first-team All-conference and the Conference Special Teams Player of the Year, as well as a finalist for the Ray Guy Award, after punting 80 times 3,636 yards (45.5 average) with 23 extra points attempted and making 5 of 12 field goal attempts.

== Professional career ==
Pre-draft measurables
| Height | Weight | Arm length | Hand span | Wingspan | 40-yard dash | 10-yard split | 20-yard split | Vertical jump | Broad jump |
|---|---|---|---|---|---|---|---|---|---|
| 6 ft 2 1/2 in (1.89 m) | 213 lb (97 kg) | 31 3/4 in (0.81 m) | 9 1/4 in (0.23 m) | 6 ft 3 3/4 in (1.92 m) | 4.73 s | 1.68 s | 2.76 s | 29.5 in (0.75 m) | 9 ft 6 in (2.90 m) |
All values from NFL Combine

=== Kansas City Chiefs ===
Fox was signed by the Kansas City Chiefs as an undrafted free agent on May 4, 2019. He was waived during final roster cuts. Fox was re-signed by the Chiefs to their practice squad on October 30, 2019, after the team's punter, Dustin Colquitt, suffered a quad strain but was released one week later on November 6.

=== Detroit Lions ===
Fox was signed to the Detroit Lions practice squad on December 5, 2019, where he spent the rest of the season. He was signed to a futures contract at the end of the season. Fox was named the Lions opening day punter at the end of training camp, beating out Arryn Siposs. Fox made his NFL debut on September 13, 2020, in the season opener against the Chicago Bears, punting 4 times for 197 yards (49.3 average) with two punts inside the 20-yard line. Fox was named the National Football Conference (NFC) Special Teams Player of the Month for September.

Fox finished his first season with 59 punts for an average of 49.1 yards and a net average of 44.8, both Lions records, and was named to the 2021 Pro Bowl and second-team All-Pro. He was given an exclusive-rights free agent tender by the Lions on March 4, 2021. He signed the one-year contract on April 23.

On October 22, 2022, Fox signed a three-year, $11.325 million contract extension with the Lions, making him the highest-paid punter in the league. In the 2023 NFL season, Fox made it to the NFC Championship with the Lions where he punted twice for 108 yards (54.0 average). The Lions would ultimately lose to the San Francisco 49ers 31–34 after allowing a 17-point comeback.

In Week 3 of the 2024 season, Fox punted five times, with four inside the 20-yard line in a 20-13 win over the Arizona Cardinals, earning NFC Special Teams Player of the Week. Fox finished the season with 45 punts for 2,295 yards. He led the league in both yards per punt (51.0) and net yards per punt (45.8), earning Pro Bowl honors for his performance. In the 2025 season, he finished with 56 punts for 2,611 yards for a 46.6 average.

In Week 8 of the 2026 season against the until then undefeated Minnesota Vikings, Fox punted four times, averaging 46.5 yards per boot and placing three punts inside the 20-yard line, earning him NFC Special Teams Player of the Week.

== NFL career statistics ==
Legend
| | Led the league |
| **Bold** | Career high |

=== Regular season ===
| Year | Team | GP | Punting | | | | | | |
| Year | Team | GP | Punts | Yds | Lng | Avg | Blk | Ins20 | RetY |
|---|---|---|---|---|---|---|---|---|---|
| 2020 | DET | 16 | 59 | 2,897 | 67 | 49.1 | 0 | 26 | 116 |
| 2021 | DET | **17** | **65** | **3,198** | **70** | 49.2 | 0 | 17 | 308 |
| 2022 | DET | **17** | 52 | 2,525 | 66 | 48.6 | 0 | 14 | **313** |
| 2023 | DET | **17** | 57 | 2,646 | **70** | 46.4 | 0 | 26 | 164 |
| 2024 | DET | **17** | 45 | 2,295 | 68 | **51.0** | 0 | 22 | 136 |
| 2025 | DET | **17** | 56 | 2,611 | **70** | 46.6 | 0 | **28** | 236 |
| 2026 | DET | 9 | 30 | 1,428 | 65 | 47.6 | 0 | 15 | 76 |
| Career | | 110 | 364 | 17,600 | 70 | 48.4 | 0 | 148 | 1,349 |

=== Postseason ===
| Year | Team | GP | Punting | | | | | | |
| Year | Team | GP | Punts | Yds | Lng | Avg | Blk | Ins20 | RetY |
|---|---|---|---|---|---|---|---|---|---|
| 2023 | DET | **3** | **10** | **474** | **74** | **47.4** | 0 | **7** | 0 |
| 2024 | DET | 1 | 1 | 43 | 43 | 43.0 | 0 | 0 | 0 |
| Career | | 4 | 11 | 517 | 74 | 47.0 | 0 | 7 | 0 |

== Personal life ==
In the 2021 off-season, Fox organized a young specialist camp where he invited youth kickers and punters from the Detroit area. An avid Yu-Gi-Oh! player, Fox showed his Instagram followers his collection of nearly 600 cards in a live stream in June of 2025. In a 2024 interview with the Detroit Metro Times, Fox referenced his childhood interest in Harry Potter, describing himself as a "Hufflepuff, perfectly at home here in Detroit".
