= Lance Newmark =

American football executive

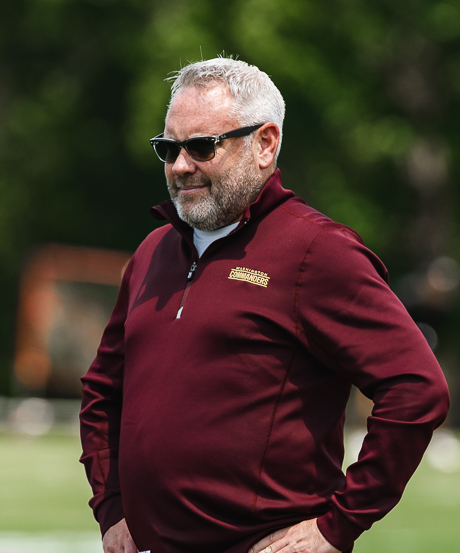
- Newmark with the Washington Commanders, 2025

Washington Commanders
- Title: Assistant general manager

Personal information
- Born: La Mesa, California, U.S.

Career information
- Position: Wide receiver
- College: San Diego Mesa (1995–1996); San Diego (1997)

Career history
- San Diego Chargers (1996–1997); Staff assistant; Detroit Lions (1998–2023); Player personnel assistant (1998); Area scout (1999–2004); National scout (2005–2007); Assistant director of college scouting (2008–2014); Director of college scouting (2015–2016); Director of player personnel (2016–2021); Senior director of player personnel (2022–2023); Washington Commanders (2024–present); Assistant general manager

Lance Newmark is an American professional football executive who is the assistant general manager for the Washington Commanders of the National Football League (NFL). He played college football for the San Diego Mesa Olympians and San Diego Toreros before joining the NFL's San Diego Chargers as a staff assistant in 1996. Newmark later joined the Detroit Lions in 1998, working as a scout and executive in various roles for 26 seasons until joining the Commanders in 2024.

== Early life ==
Newmark was born in La Mesa, California. He played college football as a wide receiver for the San Diego Mesa Olympians from 1995 to 1996 before transferring to play the 1997 season with the San Diego Toreros. He graduated from the school with a degree in social sciences.

== Executive career ==
Newmark joined the San Diego Chargers in 1996, serving two seasons under general manager Bobby Beathard. With the Chargers, he held the position of staff assistant. In 1998, he left for the Detroit Lions, where he became an assistant in the player personnel department. He then became an area scout for the Lions in 1999. After six years as an area scout, Newmark was promoted to national scout in 2005. He worked in that position from 2005 to 2007.

Newmark was promoted to assistant director of college scouting in 2008, which he served in through 2014, then to director of college scouting in 2015. He remained with the Lions under several different general managers and received another promotion, to director of player personnel, in 2016. By 2020, he was the Lions' longest-serving employee in the scouting department, and after general manager Bob Quinn was fired during the 2020 season, Newmark became one of three who jointly served as de facto general manager for remainder of the year along with Rob Lohman and Kyle O'Brien. Newmark was named senior director of player personnel in 2022.

In 2024, Newmark joined the Washington Commanders as assistant general manager under Adam Peters.

== Personal life ==
Newmark is married and has three daughters.
