= Ardrey Kell High School =

American public school in Charlotte, NC

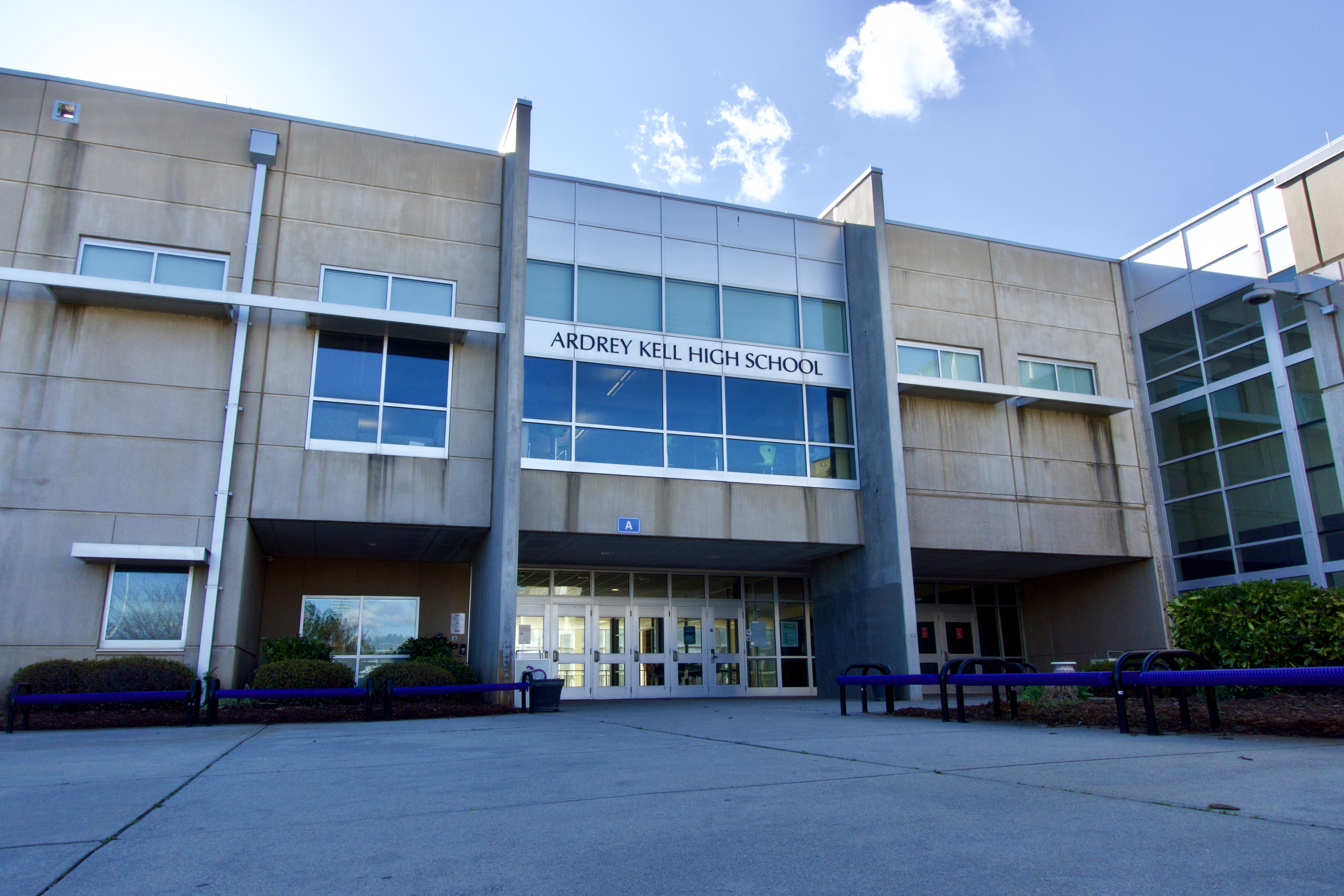
- Ardrey Kell High School, 2022

Location
- 10220 Ardrey Kell Road; Charlotte, North Carolina 28277; United States; 35°01′49″N 80°49′34″W

Information
- Type: Public
- Established: 2006 (20 years ago)
- School district: Charlotte-Mecklenburg Schools
- CEEB code: 340735
- Staff: 145.65 (FTE)
- Enrollment: 3,036 (2024–2025)
- Student to teacher ratio: 20.84
- Colors: Purple, white, and black
- Athletics: NCHSAA 8A
- Athletics conference: Southwestern 7A/8A
- Mascot: Knights
- Rivals: Marvin Ridge, Myers Park, Providence
- Website: ardreykellhs.cmsk12.org

Ardrey Kell High School is a public high school serving grades 9–12 in the Ballantyne area of Charlotte, North Carolina, United States. The school is part of Charlotte-Mecklenburg Schools district.

== History ==
Established in 2006, Ardrey Kell High School was built in the growing Ballantyne area of Charlotte.

Ardrey Kell was named after two prominent local families in the area known as "Lower Providence" in southern Mecklenburg County. Both families have served the community as farmers, physicians, educators, politicians and church leaders.

During the 19th century, the Ardrey family owned a sizable cotton plantation in the southern part of Mecklenburg County. A member of the family, Captain William E. Ardrey (1839–1907), was a farmer, served in the Confederate Army, and was a member of the North Carolina State Legislature. He was described by a Charlotte News article, dated August 14, 1916, as "One of the leading citizens of Mecklenburg County." His father, Dr. William A. Ardrey (1798–1861), was the Ardrey's family head. Dr. James Kell (1834–1910), a friend of Ardrey, took over his property after Ardrey’s death.

The school is located on Ardrey Kell Road.

== Notable alumni ==
- Tessa Blanchard, professional wrestler and actress
- Giuseppe Gentile, professional soccer player
- Cedric Gray, NFL linebacker
- Gabe Jeudy-Lally, NFL cornerback for the Tennessee Titans
- Tucker Lepley, professional soccer player
- Julian Okwara, NFL defensive end and younger brother of Romeo Okwara
- Romeo Okwara, NFL defensive end
- Jack Reinheimer, MLB shortstop
- Mike Senatore, creator of the water bottle flip viral internet trend
- Prince Shembo, NFL linebacker
- Murphy Smith, professional long distance runner
- Taylor Suarez, college soccer player
- Trent Thornton, MLB pitcher
- Alex Wood, MLB pitcher, 2017 All-Star selection and 2020 World Series champion
