= Murphy Smith (runner) =

American long-distance runner

Personal information
- Born: Charlotte, North Carolina, U.S.
- Education: United States Naval Academy (2021–2025)

Sport
- Country: United States
- Sport: Track and field, cross country running
- Events: 5000 metres, 10,000 metres, Marathon
- Club: B.A.A. High Performance Team

Achievements and titles
- Personal bests: 5000 m: 13:45.12 (2025); 10,000 m: 28:23.81 (2025); Half marathon: 1:02:49 (2025); Marathon: 2:08:58 (2026)

Murphy Smith is an American long-distance runner, a commissioned ensign in the United States Navy, and a professional marathoner representing the Boston Athletic Association (B.A.A.) High Performance Racing Team. Raised in Charlotte, North Carolina, he competed collegiately for the Navy Midshipmen from 2021 to 2025, where he won multiple Patriot League championships.

== Early life ==
Smith attended Ardrey Kell High School in Mecklenburg County, where he competed in cross country and track and field. In 2020, he won the NCHSAA 4A State Cross Country Championship with a time of 15:44.65. Following an undefeated senior season, he was named the 2021 North Carolina Gatorade Boys Cross Country Player of the Year.

== Collegiate career ==
Smith attended the United States Naval Academy in Annapolis, Maryland, majoring in quantitative economics. He won the Patriot League Cross Country Championship in 2023 and 2024. Utilizing a front-running strategy to push the pace early in races, he broke the course record at the annual Army-Navy Star Meet in 2024 with a time of 23:25.8.

During his senior track season in 2025, Smith set Navy school records in the indoor 3,000 meters (7:55.05), indoor 5,000 meters (13:45.12), and outdoor 10,000 meters (28:23.81). He concluded his collegiate career by earning Second-Team All-American honors after placing 13th in the 10,000 meters at the 2025 NCAA Division I Outdoor Track and Field Championships.

== Professional career ==
Upon graduating in 2025, Smith was commissioned as an ensign in the United States Navy and began his professional running career with the B.A.A. High Performance Team. In his professional debut, Smith won the Garry Bjorklund Half Marathon in Duluth, Minnesota, posting a time of 1:02:49.

In December 2025, Smith debuted in the marathon at the California International Marathon in Sacramento, California. He placed 10th overall in the USATF Championship field with a time of 2:11:58, meeting the qualification standard for the 2028 U.S. Olympic Marathon Trials.

Representing the United States Armed Forces, Smith captured the individual gold medal at the 2026 U.S. Armed Forces Cross Country Championship in Windcrest, Texas, qualifying for the CISM World Winter Games in Greece. In April 2026, he competed as an elite runner in the 130th Boston Marathon, finishing with a personal best time of 2:08:58.

== Personal bests ==
Event	Time	Venue	Year
Indoor 3,000m	7:55.05	Wesley A. Brown Invitational	2025
Indoor 5,000m	13:45.12	David Hemery Valentine Invitational	2025
Outdoor 10,000m	28:23.81	Raleigh Relays	2025
Half marathon	1:02:49	Garry Bjorklund Half Marathon	2025
Marathon	2:08:58	Boston Marathon	2026
