= Romeo Okwara =

American football player (born 1995)

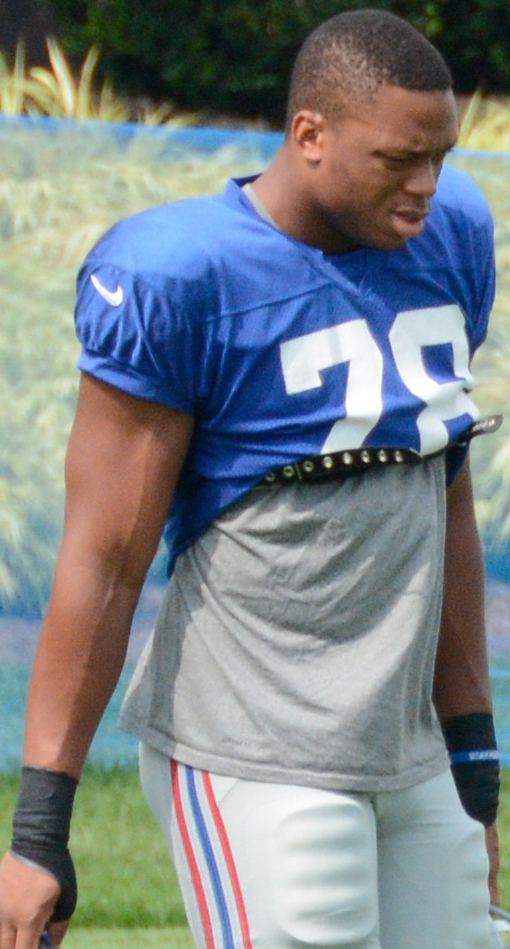
- Okwara with the New York Giants in 2016

No. 78, 95
- Position: Defensive end

Personal information
- Born: June 17, 1995 (age 31); Lagos, Nigeria
- Listed height: 6 ft 4 in (1.93 m)
- Listed weight: 255 lb (116 kg)

Career information
- High school: Ardrey Kell (Charlotte, North Carolina, U.S.)
- College: Notre Dame (2012–2015)
- NFL draft: 2016: undrafted

Career history
- New York Giants (2016–2017); Detroit Lions (2018–2023)

Career NFL statistics
- Total tackles: 162
- Sacks: 25.0
- Forced fumbles: 6
- Fumble recoveries: 1
- Pass deflections: 6
- Stats at Pro Football Reference

Romeo Chidozie Okwara (born June 17, 1995) is a Nigerian-born former American football defensive end. He played college football at Notre Dame. Okwara signed with the New York Giants as an undrafted free agent in 2016, and played six seasons with the Detroit Lions.

== Professional career ==
Pre-draft measurables
| Height | Weight | Arm length | Hand span | Wingspan | 40-yard dash | 10-yard split | 20-yard split | 20-yard shuttle | Three-cone drill | Vertical jump | Broad jump | Bench press |
|---|---|---|---|---|---|---|---|---|---|---|---|---|
| 6 ft 4 5/8 in (1.95 m) | 265 lb (120 kg) | 34 1/8 in (0.87 m) | 10 1/8 in (0.26 m) | 7 ft 0 3/8 in (2.14 m) | 4.90 s | 1.74 s | 2.89 s | 4.53 s | 7.38 s | 33.0 in (0.84 m) | 10 ft 0 in (3.05 m) | 23 reps |
All values from NFL Combine

=== New York Giants ===
Okwara signed with the New York Giants as an undrafted free agent on May 6, 2016. Okwara made his first start replacing Jason Pierre-Paul in a 10–7 victory over the Dallas Cowboys on December 11, 2016.

On October 17, 2017, Okwara was placed on injured reserve with a knee sprain. He was activated off injured reserve to the active roster on December 19, 2017.

On September 4, 2018, Okwara was waived by the Giants.

=== Detroit Lions ===
On September 5, 2018, Okwara was claimed off waivers by the Detroit Lions. On October 7, 2018, against the Green Bay Packers, Okwara strip sacked quarterback Aaron Rodgers for a fumble recovery. He played in 15 games with 15 starts, finishing with 39 combined tackles, a team-leading 7.5 sacks, and a forced fumble.

On March 1, 2019, Okwara signed a two-year contract extension with the Lions.

Okwara was placed on the active/non-football injury list at the start of training camp on August 2, 2020. He was activated on August 14, 2020.

In Week 7 of the 2020 season against the Atlanta Falcons, Okwara recorded two sacks on Matt Ryan, including a strip sack which was recovered by the Lions, during the 23–22 win. In Week 15 against the Tennessee Titans, Okwara recorded a sack on Ryan Tannehill in the endzone for a safety during the 46–25 loss. Okwara had ten sacks for the 2020 season, while the rest of the Lions team only totaled 14. In Week 17 against the Minnesota Vikings, Okwara recorded his tenth sack of the season on Kirk Cousins during the 37–35 loss. During the 2020 season, Okwara recorded the same amount of sacks as he did during the rest of his career.

On March 17, 2021, Okwara signed a three-year, $39 million contract extension with the Lions.

On October 5, 2021, Okwara was placed on injured reserve after tearing his Achilles in Week 4.

On August 23, 2022, Okwara was placed on the reserve/physically unable to perform list to start the season. He was activated on December 3.

After his contract was done with the Lions, Okwara announced he was retiring from the NFL at the age of 28 on March 19, 2024. He played the last four seasons of his career with his younger brother Julian Okwara.

== Personal life ==
Okwara's younger brother Julian Okwara, who also played college football at Notre Dame, also played for the Detroit Lions. He was born in Nigeria and moved to the United States at the age of 10.
