= Olive Sagapolu =

American football player (born 1997)

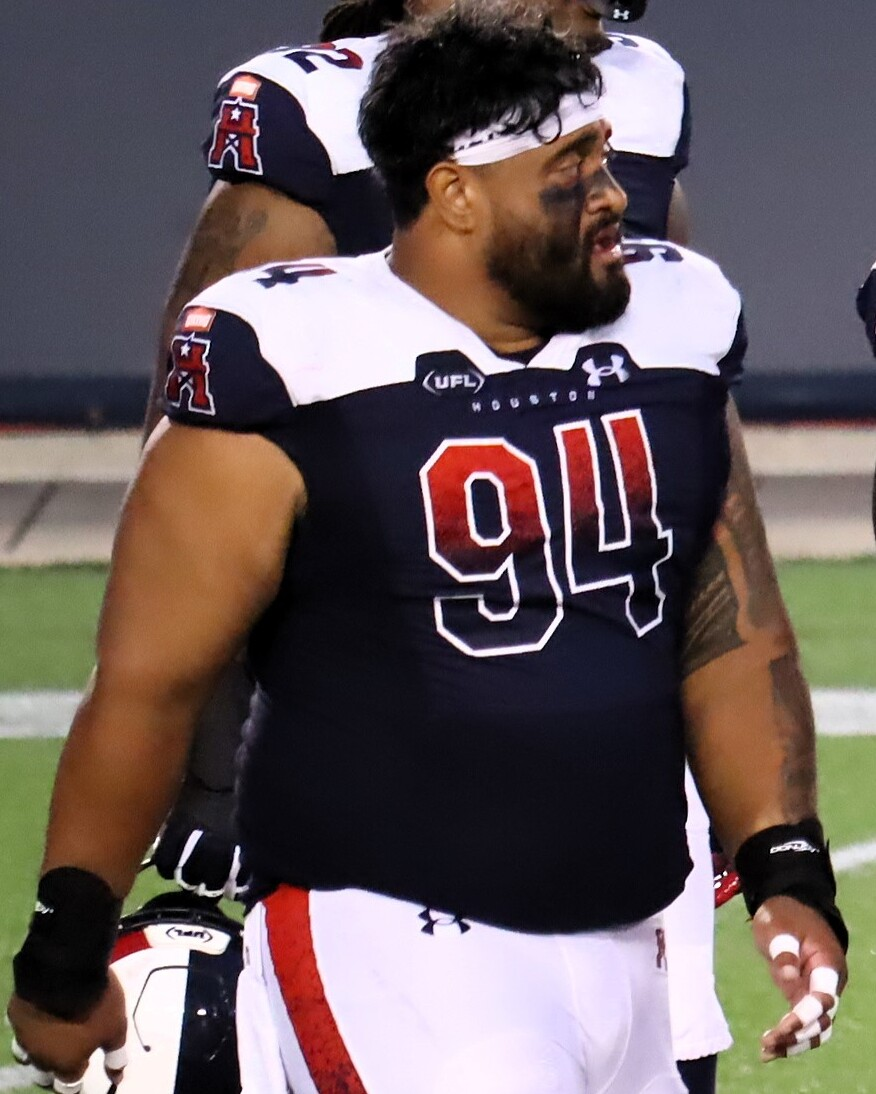
- Sagapolu with the Houston Roughnecks in 2025

Profile
- Position: Defensive tackle

Personal information
- Born: February 16, 1997 (age 29); Pago Pago, American Samoa
- Listed height: 6 ft 2 in (1.88 m)
- Listed weight: 331 lb (150 kg)

Career information
- High school: Mater Dei (Santa Ana, California, U.S.)
- College: Wisconsin (2015–2018)
- NFL draft: 2019: undrafted

Career history
- Green Bay Packers (2019)*; Detroit Lions (2019–2020)*; Atlanta Falcons (2021)*; Pittsburgh Maulers (2022–2023); Philadelphia Eagles (2023)*; New Jersey Generals (2024)*; Houston Roughnecks (2024–2025); Columbus Aviators (2026)*
- * Offseason or practice squad member only
- Stats at Pro Football Reference

Olive Sagapolu (born February 16, 1997) is an American professional football defensive tackle. He played college football at Wisconsin.

== Professional career ==
=== Green Bay Packers ===
On July 26, 2019, Sagapolu signed with the Green Bay Packers of the National Football League (NFL). He was waived on August 31.

=== Detroit Lions ===
On December 17, 2019, Sagapolu was signed to the Detroit Lions' practice squad. On December 30, 2019, Sagapolu was signed to a reserve/future contract. On August 27, 2020, Sagapolu was waived by the Lions. He was re-signed four days later but waived again on September 5.

=== Atlanta Falcons ===
On May 17, 2021, Sagapolu was signed by the Atlanta Falcons. On August 24, the Falcons released Sagapolu.

=== Pittsburgh Maulers ===
Sagapolu was selected in the 24th round of the 2022 USFL draft by the Pittsburgh Maulers He was released from his contract on August 14, 2023, to sign with an NFL team.

=== Philadelphia Eagles ===
Sagapolu signed with the Philadelphia Eagles on August 14, 2023. He was released on August 29, 2023.

=== New Jersey Generals ===
On October 31, 2023, Sagapolu signed with the New Jersey Generals. The Generals folded when the XFL and USFL merged to create the United Football League (UFL).

=== Houston Roughnecks ===
On January 5, 2024, Sagapolu was selected by the Houston Roughnecks during the 2024 UFL dispersal draft. He was placed on injured reserve on April 15, 2024. He was re-signed by the team on August 15, 2024.

=== Columbus Aviators ===
On January 13, 2026, Sagapolu was selected by the Columbus Aviators in the 2026 UFL Draft. He was released on March 19.

== Personal life ==
Sagapolu's uncle Domata Peko played in the NFL and went to Michigan State. Another uncle Tupe Peko played in the NFL and Arena Football League. Sagapolu enjoys swimming in the ocean, playing the ukulele and singing.
