= Marvin Hall =

American football player (born 1993)

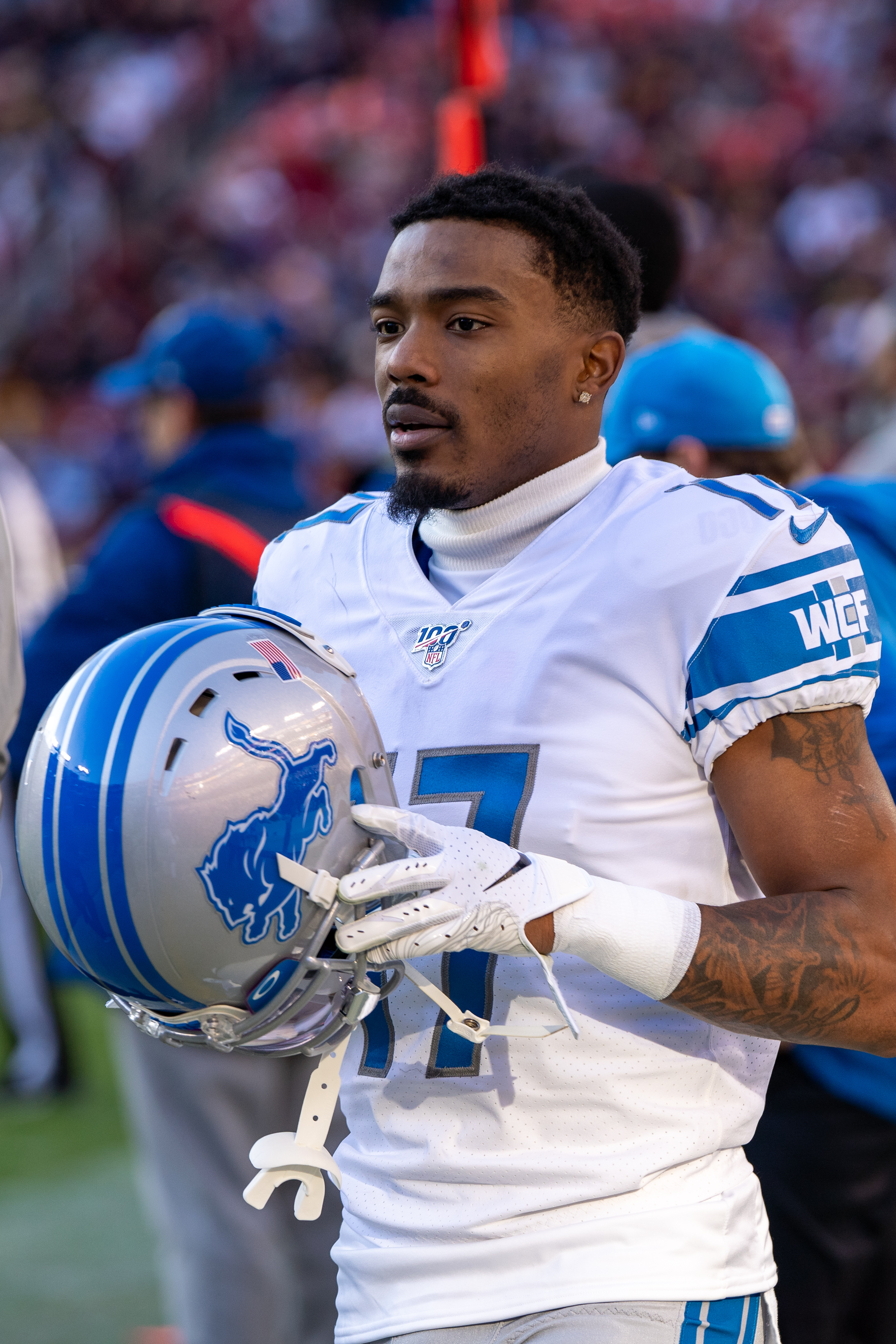
- Hall with the Detroit Lions in 2019

No. 17, 18, 9
- Position: Wide receiver

Personal information
- Born: April 10, 1993 (age 33); Los Angeles, California, U.S.
- Listed height: 5 ft 10 in (1.78 m)
- Listed weight: 190 lb (86 kg)

Career information
- High school: Susan Miller Dorsey (Los Angeles)
- College: Washington (2012–2015)
- NFL draft: 2016: undrafted

Career history
- Oakland Raiders (2016)*; Arizona Cardinals (2016–2017)*; Atlanta Falcons (2017–2018); Chicago Bears (2019)*; Detroit Lions (2019–2020); Cleveland Browns (2020); New England Patriots (2021)*; Atlanta Falcons (2021); Jacksonville Jaguars (2022)*
- * Offseason or practice squad member only

Career NFL statistics
- Receptions: 38
- Receiving yards: 782
- Receiving touchdowns: 5
- Return yards: 657
- Stats at Pro Football Reference

Marvin Hall Jr. (born April 10, 1993) is an American former professional football player who was a wide receiver in the National Football League (NFL). He played college football for the Washington Huskies. He was signed by the Oakland Raiders as an undrafted free agent in 2016.

== Professional career ==
=== Oakland Raiders ===
Hall was signed by the Oakland Raiders as an undrafted free agent on June 6, 2016, reuniting with former high school teammate Jaydon Mickens. On September 3, he was waived by the Raiders.

=== Arizona Cardinals ===
On December 14, 2016, Hall was signed to the practice squad of the Arizona Cardinals. He signed a reserve/future contract with the Cardinals on January 3, 2017. On May 10, Mickens was released by the Cardinals.

=== Atlanta Falcons ===
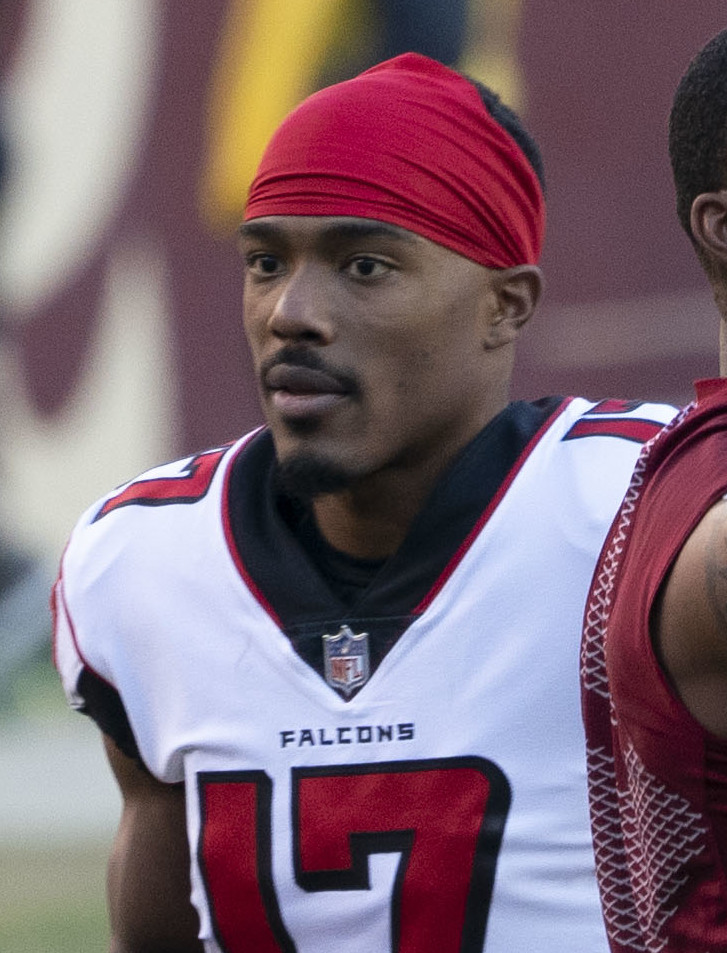
Hall with the Atlanta Falcons in 2018.

On June 2, 2017, Hall was signed by the Atlanta Falcons. He was waived on September 2, and was signed to the Falcons' practice squad. He was promoted to the active roster on October 14, and scored his first career touchdown, a 40-yard reception from Matt Ryan, the following day against the Miami Dolphins in a 20–17 loss.

=== Chicago Bears ===
On March 15, 2019, Hall signed with the Chicago Bears. He was waived by the Bears on August 31.

=== Detroit Lions ===
On September 4, 2019, Hall was signed to the Detroit Lions' practice squad. He was promoted to the active roster on September 21. Hall was placed on injured reserve on November 27, with a foot injury.

In Week 8 of the 2020 season, Hall had four receptions for 113 receiving yards in the 41–21 loss to the Indianapolis Colts. He was waived by the Lions on December 5, 2020.

=== Cleveland Browns ===
On December 7, 2020, Hall was claimed off waivers by the Cleveland Browns.

=== New England Patriots ===
On June 4, 2021, Hall signed with the New England Patriots. He was placed on injured reserve on August 15. Hall was released by the Patriots on August 25.

=== Atlanta Falcons (second stint) ===
On November 2, 2021, Hall was signed to the Atlanta Falcons' practice squad. He was released by Atlanta on January 6, 2022.

=== Jacksonville Jaguars ===
On May 16, 2022, Hall signed with the Jacksonville Jaguars after attending rookie mini-camp as a tryout player. He was released by the Jaguars on August 22.
