= Julian Okwara =

English-born Nigerian gridiron football player (born 1997)

Profile
- Position: Defensive end

Personal information
- Born: December 27, 1997 (age 28); London, England
- Listed height: 6 ft 4 in (1.93 m)
- Listed weight: 250 lb (113 kg)

Career information
- High school: Ardrey Kell (Charlotte, North Carolina, U.S.)
- College: Notre Dame (2016–2019)
- NFL draft: 2020: 3rd round, 67th overall pick

Career history
- Detroit Lions (2020–2023); Philadelphia Eagles (2024)*; Arizona Cardinals (2024); Cleveland Browns (2025)
- * Offseason or practice squad member only

Career NFL statistics as of 2025
- Total tackles: 72
- Sacks: 10
- Forced fumbles: 1
- Fumble recoveries: 1
- Pass deflections: 4
- Interceptions: 1
- Stats at Pro Football Reference

Julian C. Okwara (born December 27, 1997) is a Nigerian-English professional American football defensive end. He played college football for the Notre Dame Fighting Irish and was selected by the Detroit Lions in the third round of the 2020 NFL draft.

== Early life ==
Okwara was born in London while his mother was visiting family, but raised in Nigeria. Okwara lived in Lagos and was raised in Lekki before moving to the United States when he was in the third grade. He attended Ardrey Kell High School in Charlotte, North Carolina. A four-star defensive end recruit, Okwara committed to Notre Dame to play college football.

== College career ==
As a true freshman at Notre Dame in 2016, he played in 11 games, recording four tackles. As a sophomore in 2017, he played in 12 of 13 games, recording 17 tackles, 2.5 sacks and an interception. As a junior in 2018, he started 12 of 13 games, finishing with 38 tackles and eight sacks. Okwara returned to Notre Dame for his senior season in 2019.

== Professional career ==
Pre-draft measurables
Height	Weight	Arm length	Hand span	Wingspan	Bench press
6 ft 4 1/4 in (1.94 m)	252 lb (114 kg)	34 3/8 in (0.87 m)	10 1/4 in (0.26 m)	6 ft 9 3/4 in (2.08 m)	27 reps
All values from NFL Combine

=== Detroit Lions ===
The Detroit Lions of the National Football League (NFL) selected Okwara in the third round with the 67th overall pick of the 2020 NFL draft. On June 9, 2020, the Lions signed Okwara to a four-year contract. He was placed on injured reserve on October 21, 2020, after suffering a right leg injury in Week 6. On December 22, 2020, Okwara was activated off of injured reserve.

On December 3, 2022, Okwara was placed on injured reserve.

Okwara was waived on January 18, 2024, and re-signed to the practice squad. He was not signed to a reserve/future contract after the season and thus became a free agent when his practice squad contract expired.

=== Philadelphia Eagles ===
On February 14, 2024, Okwara signed with the Philadelphia Eagles. He was released on August 26.

=== Arizona Cardinals ===
On August 28, 2024, Okwara was signed to the Arizona Cardinals practice squad. He was promoted to the active roster on September 11.

=== Cleveland Browns ===
On April 14, 2025, Okwara signed with the Cleveland Browns. He was released on August 26 as part of final roster cuts and re-signed to the practice squad the next day.

On March 18, 2026, Okwara re-signed with the Browns. On August 31, one day after making the 53–man roster, Okwara was waived by the Browns.

== Personal life ==
Okwara's older brother, Romeo Okwara, also played college football at Notre Dame and also played in the NFL for the Lions.
