= Robert Prince (American football) =

American football coach (born 1965)

Atlanta Falcons
- Title: Wide receivers coach

Personal information
- Born: May 8, 1965 (age 61); Okinawa, Japan

Career information
- Position: Wide receiver
- High school: San Gorgonio (San Bernardino, California)
- College: Humboldt State

Career history
- Humboldt State (1989–1990) Graduate assistant; Montana State (1991) Graduate assistant; Sacramento State (1992–1993) Wide receivers coach; Fort Lewis (1994–1995) Offensive coordinator & quarterbacks coach; Portland State (1998) Wide receivers coach; Portland State (1999–2000) Offensive coordinator & quarterbacks coach; Boise State (2001–2002) Wide receivers coach; Boise State (2003) Pass game coordinator; Atlanta Falcons (2004–2005) Offensive assistant, running backs coach & tight ends coach; Atlanta Falcons (2006) Assistant quarterbacks coach; Jacksonville Jaguars (2007–2008) Assistant wide receivers coach; Seattle Seahawks (2009) Wide receivers coach; Colorado (2010) Pass game coordinator & wide receivers coach; Boise State (2011) Wide receivers coach; Boise State (2012–2013) Offensive coordinator; Detroit Lions (2014–2020) Wide receivers coach; Detroit Lions (2020) Acting head coach; Houston Texans (2021) Wide receivers coach; Dallas Cowboys (2022–2024) Wide receivers coach; Miami Dolphins (2025) Wide receivers coach; Atlanta Falcons (2026–present) Wide receivers coach
- Coaching profile at Pro Football Reference

Robert Prince (born May 8, 1965) is an American football coach who is the wide receivers coach for the Atlanta Falcons of the National Football League (NFL).

== Early life ==
Prince was born in Okinawa, Japan, where he spent the first seven years of his life, before moving to San Bernardino, California. He played football for San Gorgonio High School where he was a wide receiver. He played his first 2 years as a wide receiver at San Bernardino Valley College. He enrolled at Humboldt State University, where he graduated with a master's degree in 1992.

== Coaching career ==
=== College ===
Prince began his coaching career as a graduate assistant at his alma mater Humboldt State in 1989 and 1990, and at Montana State in 1991. He served as wide receivers coach for Sacramento State in 1992 and 1993. He served as offensive coordinator and quarterbacks coach for Fort Lewis in 1994 and 1995. He served as wide receivers coach at Portland State in 1998, before being promoted to offensive coordinator and quarterbacks coach in 1999 and 2000. He served as wide receivers coach for Boise State in 2001 and 2002, before being named pass game coordinator in 2003. Prince helped lead the Broncos to back-to-back WAC titles in 2002 and 2003.

Prior to returning to the college ranks, Prince spent six seasons as an assistant coach in the National Football League (NFL). On February 12, 2010, Prince was named passing game coordinator and receivers coach for Colorado. Prince returned to Boise State in 2011, where he served as wide receivers coach and passing game coordinator in 2011. On January 11, 2012, Prince was promoted to offensive coordinator for Boise State. Prince's offense ranked in the Top-10 in multiple national categories, including pass efficiency (4th, 171.57), scoring (5th, 44.23) and total offense (9th, 481.31).

=== National Football League ===
==== Atlanta Falcons ====
Prince got his NFL start as an offensive assistant with the Atlanta Falcons in 2004 and 2005, where he worked exclusively with running backs and tight ends his first two seasons, Prince helped Atlanta to lead the league in rushing in both of those years. He was named assistant quarterbacks coach in 2006.

==== Jacksonville Jaguars ====
On February 1, 2007, Prince was named assistant wide receivers coach for the Jacksonville Jaguars. During the 2007 season, Prince guided Jaguars wide receiver Reggie Williams to a single-season franchise record 10 touchdowns.

==== Seattle Seahawks ====
On January 13, 2009, Prince was named wide receivers coach for the Seattle Seahawks.

==== Detroit Lions ====
On January 25, 2014, Prince was named receivers coach for the Detroit Lions.

During the 2016 season, under Prince's tutelage, three wide receivers contributed to the Lions having five players record 50+ receptions. The Lions became the fifth team in NFL history, and first in franchise history, to feature five different players with at least 50 catches in a season. During the 2019 season, Prince helped guide wide receiver Kenny Golladay to his second 1,000-yard receiving season (1,190), becoming the first player in franchise history to record two 1,000-yard receiving seasons in their first three years. Golladay's 11 touchdowns were also a team and NFL-high.

Several members of the Lions coaching staff, including interim head coach Darrell Bevell, had to quarantine during the week 16 game against the Tampa Bay Buccaneers due to a COVID-19 outbreak. Prince was named acting head coach for the Lions on December 24, 2020. The Lions lost the game in a blowout 47–7, with quarterback Matthew Stafford getting injured in the first quarter.

==== Houston Texans ====
On March 10, 2021, Prince was named wide receivers coach for the Houston Texans.

==== Dallas Cowboys ====
On February 9, 2022, Prince was named wide receivers coach for the Dallas Cowboys.

==== Miami Dolphins ====
On January 28, 2025, Prince was hired by the Miami Dolphins to serve as the team's wide receivers coach.

==== Atlanta Falcons ====
On January 26, 2026, Prince was hired to be the wide receivers coach for the Atlanta Falcons, marking a return to the team where he gained his first NFL coaching job.
