= Bob Quinn (American football) =

American football executive (born 1976)

Atlanta Falcons
- Title: Senior advisor to the head coach

Personal information
- Born: April 12, 1976 (age 50); Norwood, Massachusetts, U.S.

Career information
- High school: Norwood
- College: Connecticut

Career history

Coaching
- Connecticut (1998–1999) Graduate assistant

Operations
- New England Patriots (2000–2001) Player personnel assistant; New England Patriots (2002–2003) Pro scout; New England Patriots (2004–2007) Regional scout; New England Patriots (2008) National scout; New England Patriots (2009–2011) Assistant director of pro personnel; New England Patriots (2012–2015) Director of pro scouting; Detroit Lions (2016–2020) General manager; Cleveland Browns (2021) Senior consultant; Cleveland Browns (2022–2025) Senior personnel/coaching executive; Atlanta Falcons (2026–present) Senior advisor to the head coach

Awards and highlights
- As an administrator: 4× Super Bowl champion (XXXVI, XXXVIII, XXXIX, XLIX)

Bob Quinn (born April 12, 1976) is an American professional football executive who is the senior advisor to the head coach for the Atlanta Falcons of the National Football League (NFL). He previously served as the general manager of the Detroit Lions from 2016 to 2020. Quinn began his career with the New England Patriots as a player personnel assistant in 2000 and spent 16 seasons serving in various executive roles within the Patriot organization.

== Early life ==
After graduating from Norwood High School in Norwood, Massachusetts in 1994, Quinn attended the University of Connecticut, earning a Bachelor's Degree in political science in 1998, and earning his Master's Degree in sports management in 2000. He was a graduate assistant for Connecticut in 1998 and 1999.

== Executive career ==
=== New England Patriots ===
Quinn joined the New England Patriots in 2000 as a player personnel assistant, spending two seasons in that position. He spent another two seasons as a pro scout, four seasons as a regional scout, and one season as a national scout before being promoted to assistant director of pro personnel in 2009. Quinn was promoted to Director of Pro Scouting in May 2012.

=== Detroit Lions ===
On January 8, 2016, the Detroit Lions hired Quinn as general manager.

After 2 seasons of being the GM, Quinn fired Jim Caldwell on January 1, 2018, due to the team's 9–7 record that season, which was “not good enough”, according to Quinn. This drew some criticism with the fans, as Caldwell's record with the Lions (36–28 with 2 playoff appearances) and overall win percentage (.563) was the best the Lions had since the merger.

On February 5, 2018, Quinn named Matt Patricia the head coach, who led the Lions to a 6–10 record his first year.

On November 28, 2020, Quinn along with head coach Matt Patricia, were fired by the Lions. Quinn finished his tenure with the Lions with a 31–43–1 (.420) record.

=== Cleveland Browns ===
On July 30, 2021, Quinn was hired by the Cleveland Browns to be the senior personnel and coaching executive in their football operations department under general manager Andrew Berry.

=== Atlanta Falcons ===
On January 26, 2026, Quinn was hired by the Atlanta Falcons as the senior advisor to the head coach. In this role, Quinn will continue to work with head coach Kevin Stefanski who he had worked with in Cleveland.
