= Arryn Siposs =

Australian dual-code football player (born 1992)

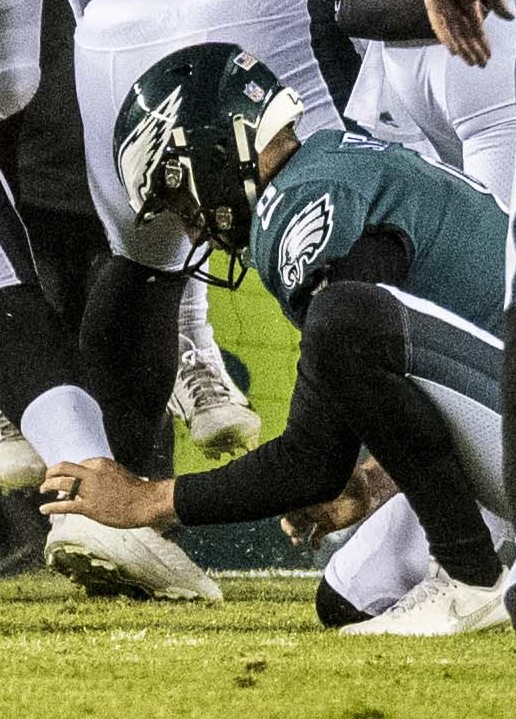
- Siposs with the Philadelphia Eagles in 2021

Personal information
- Born: 25 November 1992 (age 33) Melbourne, Victoria, Australia
- Height: 189 cm (6 ft 2 in)
- Weight: 96 kg (212 lb)
Australian rules football career
Personal information
- Original team: Dandenong Stingrays (TAC Cup)
- Draft: No. 75, 2010 National Draft, St Kilda
- Debut: Round 7, 9 May 2011, St Kilda vs. Carlton, at Docklands
- Position: Forward
Playing career^{1}
Years	Club	Games (Goals)
2011–2015	St Kilda	28 (22)
- ^{1} Playing statistics correct to the end of 2015.

Sport
- Football career

No. 8, 10
- Position: Punter

Personal information
- Listed height: 6 ft 2 in (1.88 m)
- Listed weight: 212 lb (96 kg)

Career information
- High school: Hallam (VIC) Senior College
- College: Auburn (2018–2019)
- NFL draft: 2020: undrafted
- CFL draft: 2021G: 4th round, 33rd overall pick

Career history
- Detroit Lions (2020)*; Philadelphia Eagles (2021–2023)
- * Offseason or practice squad member only

Career NFL statistics
- Punts: 107
- Punting yards: 4,768
- Average punt: 44.6
- Longest punt: 68
- Inside 20: 35
- Stats at Pro Football Reference

Arryn Siposs (/ˈsɪpɔːs/ SIP-awss; born 25 November 1992) is an Australian former professional American football punter. He is a former professional Australian rules footballer who played for the St Kilda Football Club in the Australian Football League (AFL). He later switched codes to play college football for Auburn.

== AFL career ==
Siposs was drafted by St Kilda with the 75th selection in the 2010 AFL draft from the Dandenong Stingrays in the TAC Cup. He was originally from Beaconsfield and played in the South East Juniors where he kicked 99 goals in his under 16s year. Playing in the TAC Cup for the Stingrays he kicked 34 goals in 2010.

Siposs made his debut against Carlton in round 7 of the 2011 AFL season. He was substituted on in the second half of the match and had four disposals and kicked one goal. The Saints lost by three points (81–84). He then played the next five games (and kicked five goals) but was dropped after the Saints lost to Collingwood by 57 points. He was then named in the squad to play against Port Adelaide in round 16 but was later made an emergency. Toward the end of the season, he suffered shin splints.

He was delisted at the conclusion of the 2015 season.

=== Statistics ===
Legend
G	Goals	K	Kicks	D	Disposals	T	Tackles
B	Behinds	H	Handballs	M	Marks

Season	Team	No.	Games	Totals							Averages (per game)							Votes
Season	Team	No.	Games	G	B	K	H	D	M	T	G	B	K	H	D	M	T	Votes
2011	St Kilda	2	5	5	1	21	12	33	15	7	1.0	0.2	4.2	2.4	6.6	3.0	1.4	0
2012	St Kilda	2	11	9	8	99	46	145	58	19	0.8	0.7	9.0	4.2	13.2	5.3	1.7	0
2013	St Kilda	2	9	6	8	53	43	96	30	12	0.7	0.9	5.9	4.8	10.7	3.3	1.3	0
2014	St Kilda	2	3	2	5	22	15	37	14	4	0.7	1.7	7.3	5.0	12.3	4.7	1.3	0
2015	St Kilda	2	0	—	—	—	—	—	—	—	—	—	—	—	—	—	—	0
Career			28	22	22	195	117	311	117	42	0.8	0.8	7.0	4.1	11.1	4.2	1.5	0

== American football career ==
=== College career ===
In November 2017, Siposs received an offer from Auburn University. He visited Auburn the following month and committed to play for the college football team as a punter. He had also been training with ProKick Australia, to transition from Australian rules to American football. Siposs competed for the starting punter position behind Aiden Marshall, prior to the start of the 2018 season, and was later named as backup to Marshall. However, Siposs was on the field more than Marshall against the Washington Huskies, and head coach Gus Malzahn opted to make Siposs the starting punter against the Alabama State Hornets.

=== Professional career ===
Pre-draft measurables
Height	Weight	Arm length	Hand span	40-yard dash	10-yard split	20-yard split
6 ft 2 1/2 in (1.89 m)	213 lb (97 kg)	32 in (0.81 m)	9 1/4 in (0.23 m)	5.09 s	1.84 s	3.00 s
All values from NFL Combine

==== Detroit Lions ====
On 25 April 2020, Siposs signed with the Detroit Lions at the end of the 2020 NFL draft as an undrafted free agent. He was placed on the reserve/COVID-19 list by the Lions on 29 July, and was activated 10 days later. Siposs was waived on 5 September and signed to the practice squad the next day. He was released on 21 October and re-signed to the practice squad three days later. Siposs was released from the practice squad again on 16 December, and re-signed to the practice squad again on 19 December.

==== Philadelphia Eagles ====
On 13 January 2021, Siposs signed a reserve/futures contract with the Philadelphia Eagles. Siposs made his NFL debut with the Eagles on 12 September against the Atlanta Falcons. In the 2021 season, Siposs recorded 55 punts for 2,416 yards for a 43.93 average.

During the 2022 season, Siposs injured his ankle in Week 14 and was placed on injured reserve. He recorded 44 punts for 2,005 total yards for a 45.57 average. He recovered in time to play in Super Bowl LVII against the Kansas City Chiefs. In Super Bowl LVII, Siposs punted twice. His second punt, occurring in the 4th quarter with the Eagles trailing by one point, was a low line drive that went in the wrong direction from where the gunners were positioned. Kadarius Toney took advantage and returned the punt to the five-yard line, setting up a Kansas City touchdown. The Chiefs went on to win Super Bowl LVII by 3 points.

On 29 August 2023, Siposs was waived by the Eagles and re-signed to the practice squad. On 18 September, Siposs was released from the Eagles' practice squad.

== Personal life ==
Siposs is married to his wife Rachael, and the couple have a daughter together. He has Hungarian roots.

== Honours and achievements ==
Individual

- 2012 AFL Rising Star nominee
