= 2026 Columbus Aviators season =

American professional football season

- Owner: Alpha Acquico, LLC
- Head coach: Ted Ginn Jr.
- Home stadium: Historic Crew Stadium

Results
- Record: 3–7
- Conference place: 8th in UFL
- Playoffs: Did not qualify

Uniform
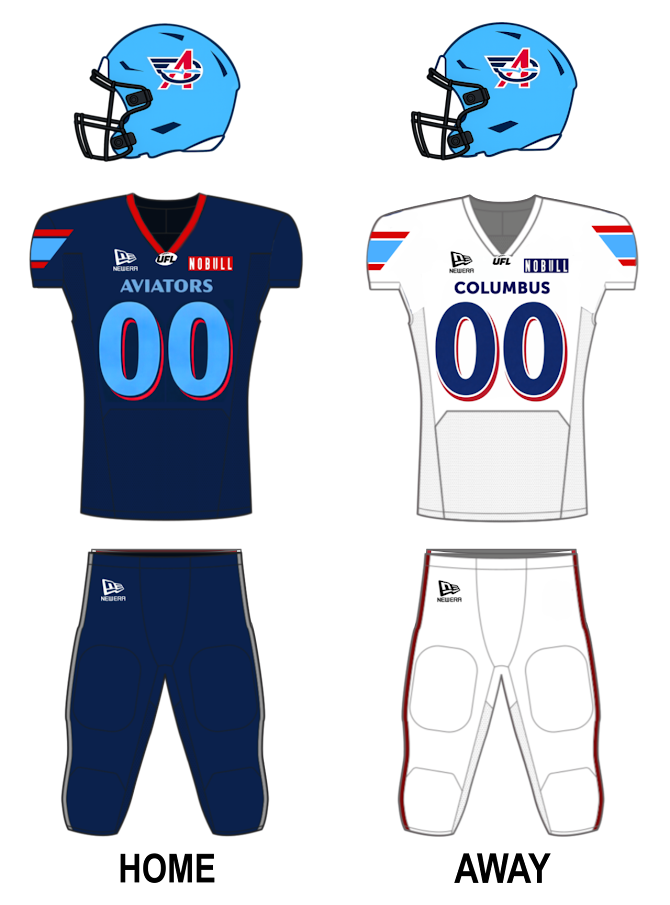

The 2026 Columbus Aviators season was the inaugural season for the Columbus Aviators. They are members of the United Football League (UFL) and play their games at Historic Crew Stadium, and are led by head coach Ted Ginn Jr..

In Week 9, despite their win over Birmingham, the Aviators were eliminated from playoff contention courtesy of wins by Louisville and St. Louis that same week.

== Offseason ==
=== Coaching changes ===
On December 17, 2025, Ted Ginn Jr. was named the team's inaugural head coach. On February 23, 2026, the Aviators announced their full 2026 coaching staff.

On April 11, 2026, Ted Ginn Jr. was arrested for driving while intoxicated in Tarrant County, Texas, ahead of a game versus the Dallas Renegades. He was released the same day on a $1,000.00 bond. Offensive coordinator Todd Haley served as the interim coach for the game, which the Aviators would lose 28–23.

On April 14, 2026, it was announced that Ted Ginn Jr. would continue coaching the Aviators.

=== Draft ===
Teams were allowed to protect up to 12 players from their 2025 rosters. Following this process, the Columbus Aviators were allocated players from the roster of the defunct Michigan Panthers.

=== Staff ===
Columbus Aviators staff
Head coach: Head coach – Ted Ginn Jr.; Offensive coaches: Offensive coordinator – Todd Haley; Running backs – Bob Saunders; Wide receivers – Tito Overton; Offensive line – Ronnie Vinklarek	Defensive coaches: Defensive coordinator – Captain Munnerlyn; Defensive line – Curtis Terry; Linebackers – Larry Grant; Defensive backs – Rasul Spain

== Final roster ==
2026 Columbus Aviators final roster
Quarterbacks: 8 Jalan McClendon; 2 Jalen Morton; 12 Aidan Sayin; Running backs: 5 John Lovett; 35 Toa Taua; 4 ZaQuandre White; Wide receivers: 17 Yulkeith Brown; 3 Keke Chism; 81 Tay Martin; 7 Jaylon Moore; 6 Antwane Wells Jr.; 85 Easop Winston; Tight ends: 87 Camren McDonald; 84 Gunnar Oakes	Offensive linemen: 69 Cohl Cabral G; 71 Matt Farniok C; 77 Chuck Filiaga G/T; 64 Chris Glaser G; 58 Bless Harris T; 67 Aaron Monteiro T/G; 75 Ryan Nelson T; 65 Wisdom Quarshie C/G; Defensive linemen: 45 Celestin Haba DE; 98 Patrick Jenkins DT; 99 Walter Palmore DT; 96 Caeveon Patton DT; 56 Ron Stone Jr. DE; 97 Syrus Webster DE; 0 Jacoby Windmon DE	Linebackers: 30 Xavier Benson ILB; 10 Noah Dawkins ILB; 1 Tony Fields II ILB; 11 Fred Thompkins; 57 Jailin Walker ILB; Defensive backs: 33 Henry Black S; 24 Elijah Blades CB; 15 Akeem Dent S; 13 O'Donnell Fortune CB; 22 Tre'von Jones CB; 41 Michael Lawson S; 21 D. J. Miller CB; 27 Smoke Monday S; 23 Nehemiah Shelton CB; 9 Cam Smith CB; 32 Kedrick Whitehead Jr. S; Special teams: 50 Payton Bunch LS; 14 Jonah Dalmas K; 83 Brad Robbins P	Reserve lists: 14 Rashard Davis WR (IR); 20 Storey Jackson ILB (IR); 88 Alizé Mack TE (IR); -- Devin Ross WR (IR); 48 Kenny Willekes DE (IR); 28 Kyree Woods S (IR); 48 active, 6 inactive

== Schedule ==
All times Eastern

Week	Date	Time	TV	Opponent	Result	Record	Venue	Attendance
1	March 29	8:00 p.m.	ESPN	at Orlando Storm	L 16–23	0–1	Inter&Co Stadium	11,127
2	April 3	8:00 p.m.	Fox	DC Defenders	L 26–44	0–2	Historic Crew Stadium	14,810
3	April 12	12:00 p.m.	ABC	at Dallas Renegades	L 23–28	0–3	Toyota Stadium	5,133
4	April 17	8:00 p.m.	Fox	Dallas Renegades	W 28–14	1–3	Historic Crew Stadium	8,729
5	April 26	12:00 p.m.	ABC	at Houston Gamblers	L 13–17	1–4	Shell Energy Stadium	5,166
6	May 1	8:00 p.m.	Fox	Houston Gamblers	W 24–17	2–4	Historic Crew Stadium	8,347
7	May 8	8:00 p.m.	Fox	at St. Louis Battlehawks	L 20–31	2–5	The Dome at America's Center	18,563
8	May 17	1:00 p.m.	Fox	at Birmingham Stallions	L 3–14	2–6	Protective Stadium	4,824
9	May 23	3:00 p.m.	ABC	Birmingham Stallions	W 36–29	3–6	Historic Crew Stadium	9,127
10	May 31	6:00 p.m.	Fox	Louisville Kings	L 27–42	3–7	Historic Crew Stadium	10,705

=== Game summaries ===
==== Week 1: at Orlando Storm ====
Week 1: Columbus Aviators at Orlando Storm – Game summary

Quarter	1	2	3	4	Total
Aviators	6	0	0	10	16
Storm	6	3	14	0	23

at Inter&Co Stadium • Orlando, Florida

- Date: March 29
- Game time: 8:00 p.m. EDT
- Game weather: Partly cloudy, 69 °F (21 °C)
- Game attendance: 11,127
- Referee: Bryan Banks
- TV announcers (ESPN): Joe Tessitore, Jordan Rodgers, Sam Acho and Tom Luginbill
- Game Book

Game information

First quarter

- ORL – Jashaun Corbin 21-yard run (Michael Lantz kick), 13:47. Storm 6–0. Drive: 3 plays • 34 yards • 1:04
- CLB – Ryan Coe 35-yard field goal, 9:08. Storm 6–3. Drive: 9 plays • 40 yards • 4:39
- CLB – Ryan Coe 37-yard field goal, 1:52. Tied 6–6. Drive: 7 plays • 32 yards • 3:54

Second quarter

- ORL – Michael Lantz 55-yard field goal, 0:00. Storm 9–6. Drive: 12 plays • 56 yards • 2:41

Third quarter

- ORL – Jashaun Corbin 13-yard run (Michael Lantz kick), 11:02. Storm 16–6. Drive: 7 plays • 75 yards • 3:58
- ORL – Chris Rowland 9-yard pass from Jack Plummer (Michael Lantz kick), 4:39. Storm 23–6. Drive: 8 plays • 109 yards • 4:08

Fourth quarter

- CLB – Ryan Coe 33-yard field goal, 14:55. Storm 23–9. Drive: 9 plays • 50 yards • 4:44
- CLB – ZaQuandre White 3-yard run (Ryan Coe kick), 5:29. Storm 23–16. Drive: 13 plays • 75 yards • 7:21

Top passers

- CLB – Jalan McClendon – 21/32, 212 yards
- ORL – Jack Plummer – 17/22, 245 yards, TD

Top rushers

- CLB – ZaQuandre White – 3 rushes, 48 yards, TD
- ORL – Jashaun Corbin – 15 rushes, 66 yards, 2 TD

Top receivers

- CLB – Tay Martin – 7 receptions, 86 yards
- ORL – Elijhah Badger – 4 receptions, 132 yards

==== Week 2: vs. DC Defenders ====
Week 2: DC Defenders at Columbus Aviators – Game summary

Quarter	1	2	3	4	Total
Defenders	7	17	14	6	44
Aviators	7	7	6	6	26

at Historic Crew Stadium • Columbus, Ohio

- Date: April 3
- Game time: 8:00 p.m. EDT
- Game weather: Partly cloudy, 72 °F (22 °C)
- Game attendance: 14,810
- Referee: Michael Vandervelde
- TV announcers (Fox): Curt Menefee, Joel Klatt and Brock Huard
- Game Book

Game information

First quarter

- DC – Deon Jackson 1-yard run (Matt McCrane kick), 10:37. Defenders 7–0. Drive: 8 plays • 43 yards • 4:23
- CLB – Jalan McClendon 1-yard run (Ryan Coe kick), 3:46. Tied 7–7. Drive: 13 plays • 60 yards • 6:51

Second quarter

- DC – Matt McCrane 35-yard field goal, 14:23. Defenders 10–7. Drive: 9 plays • 42 yards • 4:23
- DC – Xazavian Valladay 10-yard run (Matt McCrane kick), 5:11. Defenders 17–7. Drive: 9 plays • 59 yards • 4:33
- DC – Deon Jackson 12-yard run (Matt McCrane kick), 1:56. Defenders 24–7. Drive: 2 plays • 41 yards • 0:27
- CLB – ZaQuandre White 6-yard run (Ryan Coe kick), 0:55. Defenders 24–14. Drive: 3 plays • 15 yards • 0:18

Third quarter

- DC – Deon Jackson 48-yard run (Matt McCrane kick), 7:46. Defenders 31–14. Drive: 2 plays • 50 yards • 0:49
- DC – Briley Moore 21-yard pass from Jordan Ta'amu (Matt McCrane kick), 6:17. Defenders 38–14. Drive: 3 plays • 27 yards • 1:20
- CLB – Alizé Mack 21-yard pass from Jalan McClendon (two-point pass failed), 0:00. Defenders 38–20. Drive: 12 plays • 60 yards • 6:17

Fourth quarter

- DC – Matt McCrane 25-yard field goal, 8:12. Defenders 41–20. Drive: 10 plays • 56 yards • 6:48
- CLB – Tay Martin 3-yard pass from Jalan McClendon (three-point pass failed), 3:22. Defenders 41–26. Drive: 10 plays • 75 yards • 4:50
- DC – Matt McCrane 32-yard field goal, 1:56. Defenders 44–20. Drive: 4 plays • 4 yards • 1:21

Top passers

- DC – Jordan Ta'amu – 8/11, 99 yards, TD, INT
- CLB – Jalan McClendon – 23/37, 157 yards, 2 TD, INT

Top rushers

- DC – Deon Jackson – 11 rushes, 97 yards, 3 TD
- CLB – Jalan McClendon – 8 rushes, 55 yards, TD

Top receivers

- DC – Cornell Powell, 4 receptions, 41 yards
- CLB – Tay Martin, 6 receptions, 57 yards, TD

==== Week 3: at Dallas Renegades ====
Week 3: Columbus Aviators at Dallas Renegades – Game summary

Quarter	1	2	3	4	Total
Aviators	7	3	7	6	23
Renegades	0	14	14	0	28

at Toyota Stadium • Frisco, Texas

- Date: April 12
- Game time: 12:00 p.m. EDT
- Game weather: Partly cloudy, 66 °F (19 °C)
- Game attendance: 5,133
- Referee: James Carter
- TV announcers (ABC): Roy Philpott, Roddy Jones, Cole Cubelic and Max Browne
- Game Book

Game information

First quarter

- CLB – John Lovett 8-yard pass from Jalan McClendon (Ryan Coe kick), 10:25. Aviators 7–0. Drive: 8 plays • 40 yards • 4:35

Second quarter

- DAL – Deontay Burnett 2-yard pass from Austin Reed (Colton Theaker kick), 11:30. Tied 7–7. Drive: 7 plays • 65 yards • 3:50
- CLB – Ryan Coe 53-yard field goal, 4:26. Aviators 10–7. Drive: 6 plays • 22 yards • 2:48
- DAL – Ajene Harris 3-yard interception return (Colton Theaker kick), 1:22. Renegades 14–10.

Third quarter

- DAL – Dae Dae Hunter 1-yard run (Colton Theaker kick), 5:52. Renegades 21–10. Drive: 14 plays • 79 yards • 9:08
- DAL – Emmanuel Butler 2-yard pass from Austin Reed (Colton Theaker kick), 2:43. Renegades 28–10. Drive: 2 plays • 9 yards • 1:32
- CLB – John Lovett 2-yard run (Ryan Coe kick), 0:23. Renegades 28–17. Drive: 6 plays • 60 yards • 2:17

Fourth quarter

- CLB – Antwane Wells Jr. 2-yard pass from Jalan McClendon (pass failed), 1:58. Renegades 28–23. Drive: 11 plays • 75 yards • 5:38

Top passers

- CLB – Jalan McClendon – 26/34, 230 yards, 2 TD, 2 INT
- DAL – Austin Reed – 18/30, 147 yards, 2 TD

Top rushers

- CLB – Jalan McClendon – 5 rushes, 24 yards
- CLB – John Lovett – 6 rushes, 24 yards, TD
- DAL – Dae Dae Hunter – 11 rushes, 62 yards, TD

Top receivers

- CLB – Tay Martin – 5 receptions, 49 yards
- DAL – Tyler Vaughns – 5 receptions, 41 yards

==== Week 4: vs. Dallas Renegades ====
Week 4: Dallas Renegades at Columbus Aviators – Game summary

Quarter	1	2	3	4	Total
Renegades	7	7	0	0	14
Aviators	0	14	7	7	28

at Historic Crew Stadium • Columbus, Ohio

- Date: April 17
- Game time: 8:00 p.m. EDT
- Game weather: Partly cloudy, 79 °F (26 °C)
- Game attendance: 8,729
- Referee: Kole Knueppel
- TV announcers (Fox): Kevin Kugler, Joel Klatt and Jake Butt
- Game Book

Game information

First quarter

- DAL – Drake Stoops 17-yard pass from Austin Reed (Colton Theaker kick), 11:11. Renegades 7–0. Drive: 7 plays • 68 yards • 3:49

Second quarter

- CLB – ZaQuandre White 1-yard run (Ryan Coe kick), 12:16. Tied 7–7. Drive: 6 plays • 25 yards • 3:02
- DAL – Emmanuel Butler 7-yard pass from Austin Reed (Colton Theaker kick), 7:02. Renegades 14–7. Drive: 10 plays • 80 yards • 5:14
- CLB – Keke Chism 20-yard pass from Jalan McClendon (Ryan Coe kick), 0:50. Tied 14–14. Drive: 12 plays • 70 yards • 6:12

Third quarter

- CLB – Alizé Mack fumble recovery in the end zone (Ryan Coe kick), 10:19. Aviators 21–14.

Fourth quarter

- CLB – Toa Taua 2-yard run (Ryan Coe kick), 6:33. Aviators 28–14. Drive: 18 plays • 97 yards • 9:59

Top passers

- DAL – Austin Reed – 13/27, 144 yards, 2 TD, INT
- CLB – Jalan McClendon – 10/15, 126 yards, TD

Top rushers

- DAL – Dae Dae Hunter – 6 rushes, 45 yards
- CLB – John Lovett – 15 rushes, 80 yards

Top receivers

- DAL – Tyler Vaughns – 5 receptions, 59 yards
- CLB – Keke Chism – 4 receptions, 50 yards

==== Week 5: at Houston Gamblers ====
Week 5: Columbus Aviators at Houston Gamblers – Game summary

Quarter	1	2	3	4	Total
Aviators	0	13	0	0	13
Gamblers	7	7	0	3	17

at Shell Energy Stadium • Houston, Texas

- Date: April 26
- Game time: 12:00 p.m. EDT
- Game weather: Partly cloudy, 81 °F (27 °C)
- Game attendance: 5,166
- Referee: Adam Savoie
- TV announcers (ABC): Roy Philpott, Roddy Jones, Harry Douglas and Cole Cubelic
- Game Book

Game information

First quarter

- HOU – Jalen White 1-yard run (John Hoyland kick), 7:51. Gamblers 7–0. Drive: 13 plays • 75 yards • 7:09

Second quarter

- HOU – Nolan Henderson 5-yard run (John Hoyland kick), 13:53. Gamblers 14–0. Drive: 12 plays • 65 yards • 6:51
- CLB – Jalan McClendon 1-yard run (Ryan Coe kick), 8:57. Gamblers 14–7. Drive: 10 plays • 67 yards • 4:56
- CLB – Toa Taua 7-yard run (kick failed), 0:32. Gamblers 14–13. Drive: 8 plays • 46 yards • 3:38

Third quarter

- No scoring plays

Fourth quarter

- HOU – John Hoyland 23-yard field goal, 14:20. Gamblers 17–13. Drive: 10 plays • 31 yards • 5:19

Top passers

- CLB – Jalan McClendon – 15/22, 160 yards
- HOU – Nolan Henderson – 13/25, 146 yards

Top rushers

- CLB – ZaQuandre White – 10 rushes, 38 yards
- HOU – Nolan Henderson – 6 rushes, 37 yards, TD

Top receivers

- CLB – Alizé Mack – 3 receptions, 42 yards
- HOU – Lawrence Keys III – 3 receptions, 43 yards

==== Week 6: vs. Houston Gamblers ====
Week 6: Houston Gamblers at Columbus Aviators – Game summary

Quarter	1	2	3	4	Total
Gamblers	7	3	7	0	17
Aviators	7	14	3	0	24

at Historic Crew Stadium • Columbus, Ohio

- Date: May 1
- Game time: 8:00 p.m. EDT
- Game weather: Partly cloudy, 48 °F (9 °C)
- Game attendance: 8,347
- Referee: Francisco Villar
- TV announcers (Fox): Kevin Kugler, Devin Gardner and Jake Butt
- Game Book

Game information

First quarter

- CLB – John Lovett 3-yard run (Ryan Coe kick), 6:40. Aviators 7–0. Drive: 14 plays • 73 yards • 8:20
- HOU – Marcus Majors Jr. 13-yard run (John Hoyland kick), 2:26. Tied 7–7. Drive: 7 plays • 71 yards • 4:14

Second quarter

- CLB – Antwane Wells Jr. 9-yard pass from Jalan McClendon (Ryan Coe kick), 11:21. Aviators 14–7. Drive: 11 plays • 67 yards • 6:05
- HOU – John Hoyland 33-yard field goal, 8:01. Aviators 14–10. Drive: 6 plays • 22 yards • 3:20
- CLB – ZaQuandre White 7-yard run (Ryan Coe kick), 5:44. Aviators 21–10. Drive: 5 plays • 72 yards • 2:17

Third quarter

- CLB – Ryan Coe 48-yard field goal, 9:54. Aviators 24–10. Drive: 6 plays • 37 yards • 3:21
- HOU – Lawrence Keys III 9-yard pass from Taulia Tagovailoa (John Hoyland kick), 0:48. Aviators 24–17. Drive: 5 plays • 57 yards • 2:09

Fourth quarter

- No scoring plays

Top passers

- HOU – Taulia Tagovailoa – 6/10, 65 yards, TD
- CLB – Jalan McClendon – 20/26, 187 yards, TD

Top rushers

- HOU – Nolan Henderson – 2 rushes, 37 yards
- CLB – John Lovett – 17 rushes, 65 yards, TD

Top receivers

- HOU – Justin Hall – 3 receptions, 20 yards
- CLB – Tay Martin – 6 receptions, 103 yards

==== Week 7: at St. Louis Battlehawks ====
Week 7: Columbus Aviators at St. Louis Battlehawks – Game summary

Quarter	1	2	3	4	Total
Aviators	0	7	7	6	20
Battlehawks	14	10	7	0	31

at The Dome at America's Center • St. Louis, Missouri

- Date: May 8
- Game time: 8:00 p.m. EDT
- Game weather: Moderate or heavy rain showers, 72 °F (22 °C)
- Game attendance: 18,563
- Referee: Bryan Banks
- TV announcers (Fox): Curt Menefee, Joel Klatt and Brock Huard
- Game Book

Game information

First quarter

- STL – Luis Perez 1-yard run (Ramiz Ahmed kick), 6:21. Battlehawks 7–0. Drive: 8 plays • 73 yards • 4:28
- STL – Steven McBride 14-yard pass from Luis Perez (Ramiz Ahmed kick), 0:14. Battlehawks 14–0. Drive: 8 plays • 70 yards • 3:56

Second quarter

- CLB – Jalen Morton 15-yard run (Ryan Coe kick), 12:32. Battlehawks 14–7. Drive: 5 plays • 42 yards • 2:42
- STL – Ramiz Ahmed 38-yard field goal, 7:11. Battlehawks 17–7. Drive: 9 plays • 38 yards • 5:21
- STL – Kylin James 14-yard run (Ramiz Ahmed kick), 3:56. Battlehawks 24–7. Drive: 2 plays • 40 yards • 0:53

Third quarter

- CLB – Tay Martin 12-yard pass from Jalan McClendon (Ryan Coe kick), 11:08. Battlehawks 24–14. Drive: 5 plays • 44 yards • 3:10
- STL – Kylin James 18-yard run (Ramiz Ahmed kick), 7:05. Battlehawks 31–14. Drive: 6 plays • 52 yards • 4:03

Fourth quarter

- CLB – Keke Chism 10-yard pass from Jalan McClendon (kick failed), 7:16. Battlehawks 31–20. Drive: 13 plays • 84 yards • 6:25

Top passers

- CLB – Jalan McClendon – 20/28, 153 yards, 2 TD, INT
- STL – Luis Perez – 16/30, 204 yards, TD, INT

Top rushers

- CLB – John Lovett – 10 rushes, 52 yards
- STL – Jarveon Howard – 12 rushes, 59 yards

Top receivers

- CLB – Tay Martin – 7 receptions, 55 yards, TD
- STL – Jahcour Pearson – 4 receptions, 39 yards

==== Week 8: at Birmingham Stallions ====
Week 8: Columbus Aviators at Birmingham Stallions – Game summary

Quarter	1	2	3	4	Total
Aviators	0	3	0	0	3
Stallions	0	0	7	7	14

at Protective Stadium • Birmingham, Alabama

- Date: May 17
- Game time: 1:00 p.m. EDT
- Game weather: Partly cloudy, 84 °F (29 °C)
- Game attendance: 4,824
- Referee: James Carter
- TV announcers (Fox): Kevin Kugler, Joel Klatt, and Jenny Taft
- Game Book

Game information

First quarter

- No scoring plays

Second quarter

- CLB – Jonah Dalmas 48-yard field goal, 8:56. Aviators 3–0. Drive: 9 plays • 20 yards • 5:55

Third quarter

- BIR – Jordan Thomas 29-yard pass from Dorian Thompson-Robinson (Anders Carlson kick), 6:35. Stallions 7–3. Drive: 1 play • 29 yards • 0:09

Fourth quarter

- BIR – Steven Gilmore Jr. 55-yard blocked field goal return (Anders Carlson kick), 8:18. Stallions 14–3.

Top passers

- CLB – Jalan McClendon – 20/31, 150 yards, 2 INT
- BIR – Dorian Thompson-Robinson – 12/20, 126 yards, TD, INT

Top rushers

- CLB – Jalan McClendon – 4 rushes, 18 yards
- BIR – Tyrion Davis-Price – 8 rushes, 21 yards

Top receivers

- CLB – Antwane Wells Jr. – 4 receptions, 22 yards
- BIR – Jordan Thomas – 3 receptions, 28 yards, TD

==== Week 9: vs. Birmingham Stallions ====
Week 9: Birmingham Stallions at Columbus Aviators – Game summary

Quarter	1	2	3	4	Total
Stallions	13	10	3	3	29
Aviators	1	13	7	15	36

at Historic Crew Stadium • Columbus, Ohio

- Date: May 23
- Game time: 3:00 p.m. EDT
- Game weather: Cloudy, 76 °F (24 °C)
- Game attendance: 9,127
- Referee: Bryan Banks
- TV announcers (ABC): Joe Tessitore, Jordan Rodgers, Aaron Murray, and Sam Acho
- Game Book

Game information

First quarter

- BIR – Alex Cook 73-yard fumble return (kick blocked), 11:30. Stallions 6–0.
- CLB – Blocked kick returned by Nehemiah Shelton, 11:30. Stallions 6–1.
- BIR – Deon Cain 17-yard pass from Dorian Thompson-Robinson (Anders Carlson kick), 2:45. Stallions 13–1. Drive: 10 plays • 59 yards • 6:11

Second quarter

- CLB – John Lovett 17-yard pass from Jalen Morton (Jonah Dalmas kick), 14:54. Stallions 13–8. Drive: 6 plays • 64 yards • 2:51
- BIR – Tyrion Davis-Price 18-yard run (Anders Carlson kick), 10:37. Stallions 20–8. Drive: 7 plays • 10 yards • 4:17
- CLB – Gunnar Oakes 20-yard pass from Jalen Morton (two-point pass failed), 6:23. Stallions 20–14. Drive: 8 plays • 70 yards • 4:14
- BIR – Anders Carlson 19-yard field goal, 0:15. Stallions 23–14. Drive: 12 plays • 75 yards • 1:36

Third quarter

- CLB – John Lovett 34-yard pass from Jalen Morton (Jonah Dalmas kick), 5:16. Stallions 23–21. Drive: 5 plays • 59 yards • 2:55
- BIR – Anders Carlson 43-yard field goal, 1:23. Stallions 26–21. Drive: 7 plays • 39 yards • 3:53

Fourth quarter

- BIR – Anders Carlson 46-yard field goal, 11:15. Stallions 29–21. Drive: 4 plays • 2 yards • 1:55
- CLB – Jalen Morton 10-yard run (Jalen Morton–Keke Chism two-point pass), 1:37. Tied 29–29. Drive: 6 plays • 49 yards • 1:54
- CLB – D.J. Miller Jr. 39-yard interception return (Jonah Dalmas kick), 1:15. Aviators 36–29.

Top passers

- BIR – Dorian Thompson-Robinson – 16/35, 157 yards, TD, 2 INT
- CLB – Jalen Morton – 14/30, 213 yards, 3 TD, INT

Top rushers

- BIR – Snoop Conner – 10 rushes, 58 yards
- CLB – Jalen Morton – 13 rushes, 96 yards, TD

Top receivers

- BIR – Daewood Davis – 5 receptions, 50 yards
- CLB – Keke Chism – 3 receptions, 51 yards

==== Week 10: vs. Louisville Kings ====
Week 10: Louisville Kings at Columbus Aviators – Game summary

Quarter	1	2	3	4	Total
Kings	14	14	0	14	42
Aviators	14	7	6	0	27

at Historic Crew Stadium • Columbus, Ohio

- Date: May 31
- Game time: 6:00 p.m. EDT
- Game weather: Sunny, 77 °F (25 °C)
- Game attendance: 10,705
- Referee: Francisco Villar
- TV announcers (Fox): Kevin Kugler, Joel Klatt and Jake Butt
- Game Book

Game information

First quarter

- LOU – Eric Garror 28-yard interception return (Tanner Brown kick), 14:47. Kings 7–0.
- CLB – Jonah Dalmas 58-yard field goal, 9:51. Kings 7–3. Drive: 9 plays • 31 yards • 4:56
- CLB – Keke Chism 22-yard pass from Jalen Morton (Jonah Dalmas kick), 8:25. Aviators 10–7. Drive: 3 plays • 25 yards • 1:20
- LOU – Chandler Rogers 16-yard run (Tanner Brown kick), 4:10. Kings 14–10. Drive: 7 plays • 37 yards • 4:15
- CLB – Jonah Dalmas 61-yard four-point field goal, 0:24. Tied 14–14. Drive: 7 plays • 20 yards • 3:46

Second quarter

- LOU – Ian Wheeler 4-yard run (Tanner Brown kick), 3:53. Kings 21–14. Drive: 12 plays • 51 yards • 6:43
- CLB – Toa Taua 2-yard run (Jonah Dalmas kick), 1:11. Tied 21–21. Drive: 8 plays • 72 yards • 2:41
- LOU – Isaiah Winstead 14-yard pass from N'Kosi Perry (Jonah Dalmas kick), 0:22. Kings 28–21. Drive: 6 plays • 59 yards • 0:49

Third quarter

- CLB – Jonah Dalmas 49-yard field goal, 7:23. Kings 28–24. Drive: 8 plays • 45 yards • 5:05
- CLB – Jonah Dalmas 51-yard field goal, 1:15. Kings 28–27. Drive: 9 plays • 25 yards • 4:01

Fourth quarter

- LOU – Jaden Shirden 17-yard run (Tanner Brown kick), 6:47. Kings 35–27. Drive: 6 plays • 50 yards • 3:11
- LOU – Jaden Shirden 4-yard run (Tanner Brown kick), 1:14. Kings 42–27. Drive: 4 plays • 70 yards • 1:43

Top passers

- LOU – N'Kosi Perry – 8/13, 89 yards, TD
- CLB – Jalen Morton – 14/38, 221 yards, TD, INT

Top rushers

- LOU – Ian Wheeler – 14 rushes, 99 yards, TD
- CLB – Toa Taua – 13 rushes, 70 yards

Top receivers

- LOU – Lucky Jackson – 4 receptions, 20 yards
- CLB – John Lovett – 4 receptions, 40 yards

== Standings ==
2026 UFL standings
Team	W	L	PCT	GB	TD+/-	TD+	TD-	PF	PA	DIFF	STK
(y) Orlando Storm	8	2	.800	–	9	26	17	232	186	46	W4
(x) St. Louis Battlehawks	6	4	.600	2	-2	21	23	212	197	15	L1
(x) Louisville Kings	6	4	.600	2	1	27	26	265	219	46	W4
(x) DC Defenders	5	5	.500	3	6	31	25	281	224	57	L4
(e) Dallas Renegades	4	6	.400	4	2	30	28	224	259	-35	W1
(e) Birmingham Stallions	4	6	.400	4	-1	24	25	190	229	-39	L2
(e) Houston Gamblers	4	6	.400	4	-6	20	26	189	236	-60	W1
(e) Columbus Aviators	3	7	.300	5	-6	27	33	216	259	-43	L1
(x)–clinched playoff berth; (y)–clinched conference; (e)–eliminated from playoff contention
