= Ted Ginn Jr. =

American football player (born 1985)

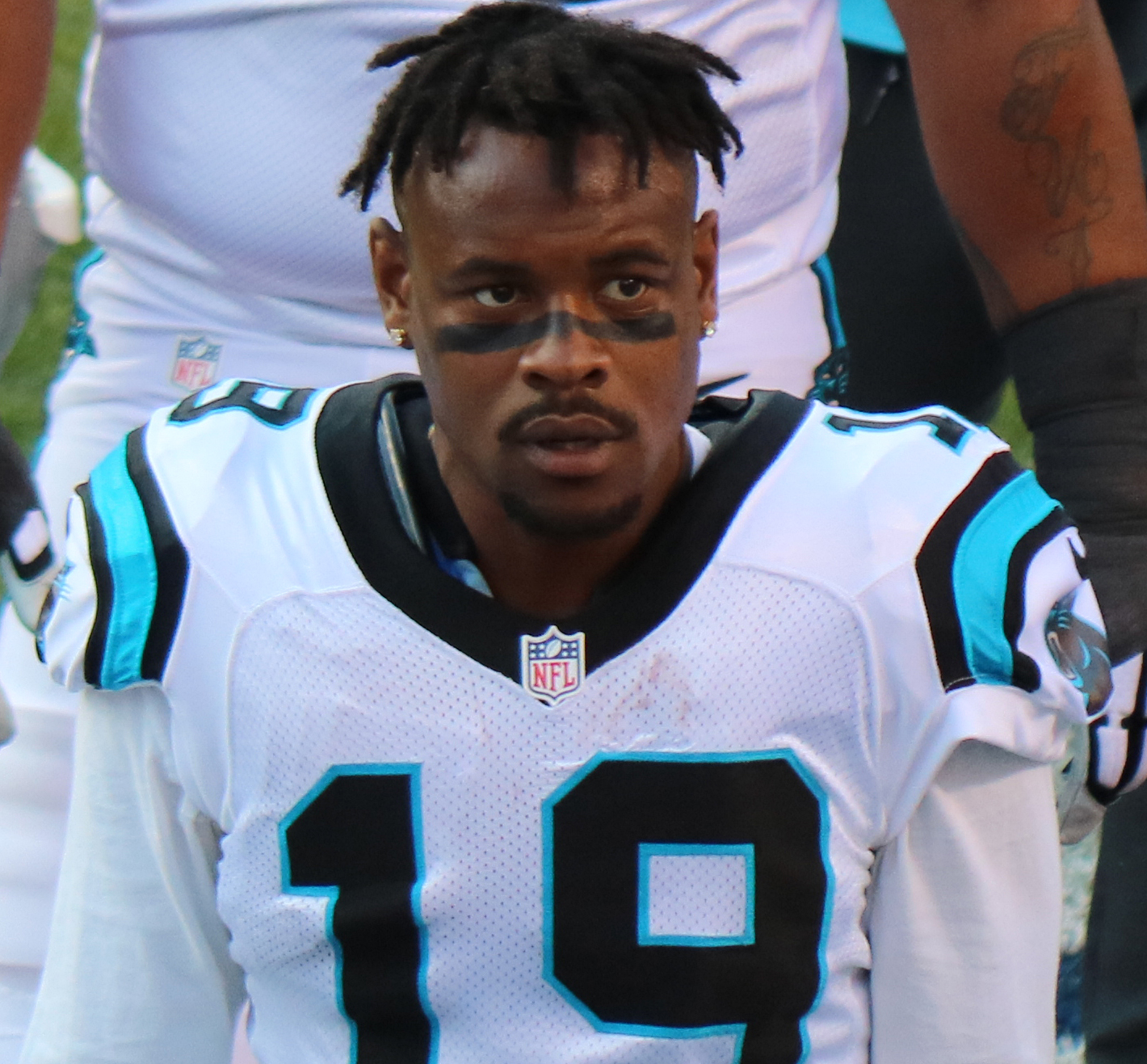
- Ginn Jr. with the Carolina Panthers in 2016

Columbus Aviators
- Title: Head coach

Personal information
- Born: April 12, 1985 (age 41); Cleveland, Ohio, U.S.
- Listed height: 5 ft 11 in (1.80 m)
- Listed weight: 180 lb (82 kg)

Career information
- Position: Wide receiver (No. 19)
- High school: Glenville (Cleveland)
- College: Ohio State (2004–2006)
- NFL draft: 2007: 1st round, 9th overall pick

Career history

Playing
- Miami Dolphins (2007–2009); San Francisco 49ers (2010–2012); Carolina Panthers (2013); Arizona Cardinals (2014); Carolina Panthers (2015–2016); New Orleans Saints (2017–2019); Chicago Bears (2020)

Coaching
- Columbus Aviators (2026–present) Head coach

Awards and highlights
- PFWA All-Rookie Team (2007); 3× First-team All-American (2004–2006); NCAA average punt return yards leader (2004); First-team All-Big Ten (2006)

Career NFL statistics
- Receptions: 412
- Receiving yards: 5,742
- Receiving touchdowns: 33
- Rushing yards: 486
- Rushing touchdowns: 2
- Return yards: 9,523
- Return touchdowns: 7
- Stats at Pro Football Reference

Head coaching record
- Regular season: 3–7 (.300)
- Career: 3–7 (.300)

Theodore Ginn Jr. (born April 12, 1985) is an American former professional football player and coach who currently serves as the head coach for the Columbus Aviators of the United Football League (UFL). He was a wide receiver for 14 seasons in the National Football League (NFL) with the Miami Dolphins, San Francisco 49ers, Carolina Panthers, Arizona Cardinals, New Orleans Saints, and Chicago Bears.

Ginn played college football for the Ohio State Buckeyes, and was selected by the Dolphins with the ninth overall pick in the 2007 NFL draft. In 2024, he was inducted into the National High School Football Hall of Fame.

== Early life ==
Ginn played for his father, Ted Ginn Sr., in high school at Glenville High School in Cleveland, Ohio, where he played defensive back, quarterback, and wide receiver for the football team. Ginn was selected as the 2004 USA Today Defensive Player of the Year, a 2004 Parade All-American, and named the 2004 SuperPrep National Defensive Player of the Year. He also participated in the U.S. Army All-American Bowl as a member of the East team, along with future Dolphins teammates Ryan Baker and Chad Henne, and was named the Most Valuable Player of the game.

Ginn intercepted eight passes as a senior, returning five of them for touchdowns. One of his interception returns went for a state-record 102-yard touchdown, while another went for a 98-yard score. Ted has two siblings, Tiffany Ginn and Jason Lucas in Akron, Ohio.

=== Track and field ===
In addition to football, Ginn was a standout track athlete for the Glenville track team. As a junior, he became the national champion in the 110 meter hurdles and recorded the best time in the nation as a senior when he won the state title for the second consecutive year. He captured the state title in the 200 meters in a time of 21.51 seconds, after posting a time of 21.44 seconds in the preliminary rounds. He also helped the track team to take the 4 x 400 metres relay crown in a time of 3:15.04 minutes. He was timed at 10.5 in the 100 meters as a high school junior. As a senior, he ran the 60 meter hurdles in 7.98 seconds, 200 meters in 21.16 seconds, 400 meters in 46.57 seconds and posted personal bests of 13.26w seconds and 13.40 seconds in the 39" 110 meter hurdles

Ohio State University track coach Russ Rogers recruited Ginn to run track, believing that he could qualify for the 2008 Summer Olympics. However, his track career was put on hold in order to focus on football. He was timed at 10.2 in the 100 meters in his freshman year.

College recruiting
Name	Hometown	School	Height	Weight	40^{‡}	Commit date
Ted Ginn Jr. CB	Cleveland, Ohio	Glenville HS	6 ft 0.5 in (1.84 m)	170 lb (77 kg)	4.43	Jan 3, 2004
Ted Ginn Jr. CB	Recruit ratings: Scout: Rivals:					
Overall recruit ranking: Scout: 1 (CB), 11 (school) Rivals: 1 (CB), 1 (OH), 16 (school)
Note: In many cases, Scout, Rivals, 247Sports, On3, and ESPN may conflict in their listings of height and weight.; In these cases, the average was taken. ESPN grades are on a 100-point scale.; Sources: "The Ohio State Football Commitments". Rivals.; "2004 The Ohio State Football Commits". Scout.; "Scout.com Team Recruiting Rankings". Scout.; "2004 Team Ranking". Rivals.com.

== College career ==
Ginn was recruited as a defensive back by Ohio State University.

=== 2004 season ===
As a freshman, Ginn saw moderate playing time at wide receiver and finished the 2004 season with 25 receptions for 359 yards and two touchdowns. He also rushed for 113 yards and 2 touchdowns on the ground, led the nation with a 25.6 yards per punt return average, and returned four punts for touchdowns (which broke a Big Ten Conference record first set by Gene Derricotte in 1947 that was later tied twice). One of the most memorable moments in his freshman season was in the 30–7 win over Indiana. A pass at the beginning of the first quarter was tipped by a diving Buster Larkins, only to be grabbed by Ginn. He then broke four tackles on his way to a 59-yard touchdown.

=== 2005 season ===
Ginn was converted to wide receiver in his sophomore year of 2005, and was named a starter. He finished the season with 51 receptions for 803 yards and four touchdowns. He also returned 18 kickoffs for 532 yards, along with 25 punts for 250 yards.

=== 2006 season ===
Entering the 2006 season, Ginn was considered by many to be a preseason candidate for the Heisman Trophy and the Biletnikoff Award. He was a second team All-American selection and finished as the Buckeyes top receiver with 59 catches for 781 yards, while adding another 706 yards and two touchdowns on special teams. Ginn returned the opening kickoff of the 2007 BCS National Championship Game for 93 yards and a touchdown. Ginn sprained his left foot when fellow Buckeye Roy Hall slid into him during the celebration following the touchdown and sat on his foot. He left the game soon after and didn't return.

Ginn finished his career at Ohio State with 135 receptions for 1,943 yards and 15 touchdowns in 37 games. He also rushed for 213 yards, returned 38 kickoffs for 1,012 yards, and gained 900 yards on 64 punt returns, the second highest total in Ohio State history. Overall, he gained 4,068 total yards and scored 26 touchdowns.

Ginn set a Big Ten record for most career punt return touchdowns with six.

== Professional career ==
=== Pre-draft ===
Pre-draft measurables
Height	Weight	Arm length	Hand span	40-yard dash	10-yard split	20-yard split
5 ft 11 1/4 in (1.81 m)	178 lb (81 kg)	33 1/8 in (0.84 m)	10 in (0.25 m)	4.38 s	1.47 s	2.48 s
All values from NFL Combine/Ohio State Pro Day

After having to bypass the field drills at the 2007 NFL combine and Ohio State's official pro day due to a lingering foot injury suffered in the 2007 BCS Title Game, Ginn reportedly ran between 4.37 and 4.45 in a private workout for NFL Scouts held on April 12, 2007. Preceding the workout it was reported that a healthy Ginn had been timed as great as 4.28 in individual team drills during his tenure at Ohio State. In addition, in a 2007 interview with Stack Magazine while discussing his own personal improvement in the 40 yard dash, Ginn himself suggests that he had been timed at a personal best of 4.22 in the 40 yard dash. In the interview, while discussing his improvement since training at one of Tim Robertson's facilities, Ginn states "...as far as my running, it's changed me a lot. When I first got here I was running like a 5.1 40, 5.2 40 to a 4.22".

=== Miami Dolphins ===
==== 2007 season ====
Ginn was selected by the Miami Dolphins with the ninth overall pick in the first round of the 2007 NFL Draft. Many were expecting the Dolphins to select Notre Dame quarterback Brady Quinn with the Dolphins in need of a quarterback, although they would end up drafting BYU quarterback John Beck in the second round. Although Ginn was considered the fastest, and one of the most athletic picks going into the draft, Miami's selection of Ginn was booed heavily by Dolphins fans at the draft and was criticized by football pundits and even teammates. Jason Taylor said he was in shock when Ginn was selected instead of Brady Quinn. Even Ginn himself was surprised by the pick. Saying "For sure when Brady Quinn was there, and you know Miami is hurting for a quarterback right now, and Brady Quinn is a great quarterback, to be in competition with him and for me to beat him out was good. I guess the coaches saw something in me that they liked."

Although Ginn wore #11 in the team's initial minicamp, it was announced he would wear #19 during the regular season to honor his father, who wore the number in high school.

Ginn eventually reached the end zone for the first time in Week 8 against the New York Giants on a 21-yard touchdown pass from quarterback Cleo Lemon.

In the second quarter of a November 18 game against the Philadelphia Eagles, Ginn returned a Saverio Rocca punt 87 yards for a touchdown. It was Ginn's first career touchdown return and tied for the longest punt return in franchise history. Ginn, who had never had more than three receptions or 37 receiving yards in any game prior, also set career highs with four receptions for 52 yards against the Eagles. For his performance, Ginn beat out four other candidates for the Diet Pepsi Rookie of the Week. He received 40 percent of the fan votes. Also, Ginn was voted by his peers as the third alternate to the 2007 Pro Bowl as a kick returner.

Ginn finished his rookie season with 34 receptions for 420 yards and two touchdowns. He also had 24 punt returns for 230 yards and a touchdown, 63 kick returns for 1,433 yards, four rushes for three yards, and three fumbles.

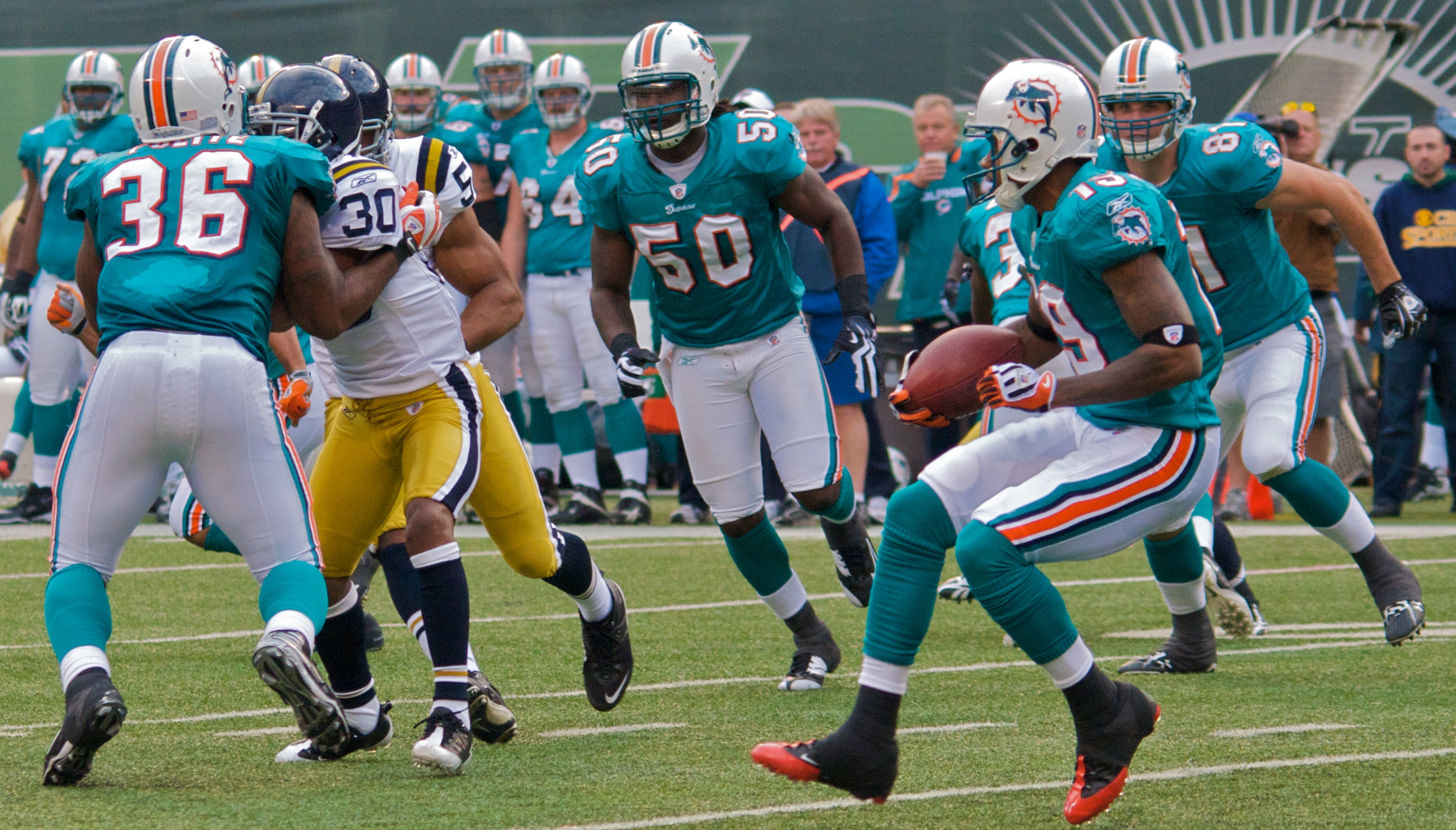
Ginn in 2009.

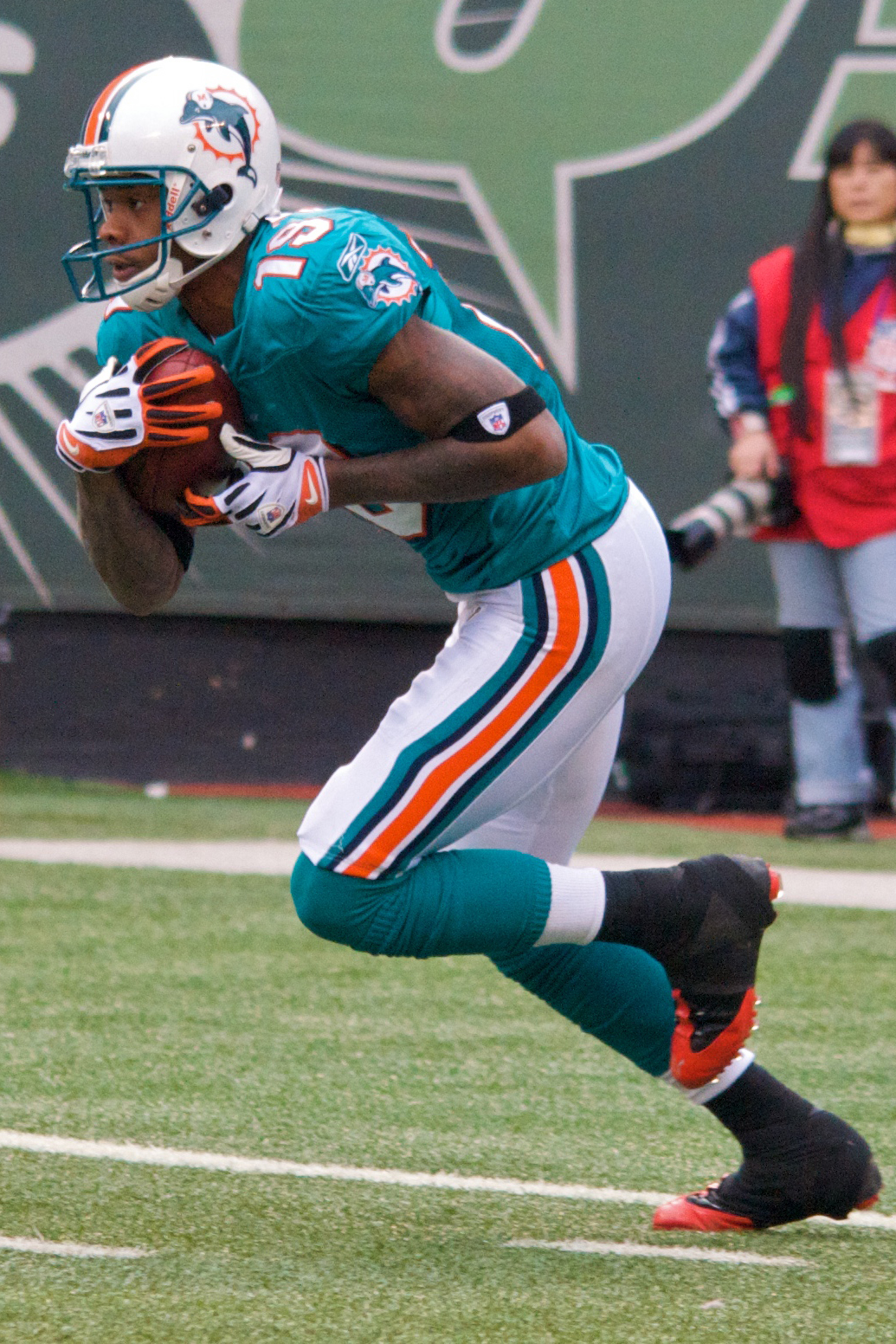
Ginn playing against the Jets in 2009.

==== 2008 season ====
At the start of the 2008 season, Ginn was removed from his return duties and was replaced as a starting wide-receiver. In the season-opening loss to the New York Jets, Ginn had two receptions for 17 yards, a rush for two yards, but also had a fumble. He had a breakout game in a win against the Buffalo Bills, totaling 175 yards on seven receptions, including a 64-yard reception. After scoring on a 40-yard end-around run and converting a crucial late-game fourth down play against the Oakland Raiders Ginn ended the season with 56 catches for 790 yards and two touchdowns, 32 kick returns for 657 yards and seven punt returns for 54 yards, two rushing touchdowns on five attempts for 73 yards, and five fumbles.

==== 2009 season ====
Ginn started the 2009 season slowly by catching two passes in his first game against the Atlanta Falcons. Ginn then seemed to have a breakout game against the Indianapolis Colts on September 21, 2009, catching a career-high 11 passes for 108 yards. Although a career game, he was criticized for dropping two potential touchdown passes, one in the final minutes of the game. The next two games, Ginn dropped several passes and caught only one 4-yard pass and had a 22-yard run. In Week 5 against the rival New York Jets, Ginn had just two catches, but one was a 53-yard touchdown to help the Dolphins win. New Dolphins quarterback Chad Henne was hoped to improve Ginn's game. Ginn however continued to struggle in the passing game and was demoted to backup wide receiver after Week 7. Ginn said he was angry and embarrassed about the benching entering Week 8 against the rival New York Jets. Although Ginn caught no passes in the game, he was given full-time kickoff return duties, and took out his frustrations by tying an NFL record with two kickoff returns for touchdowns, one of 100 yards and the second of 101. Those touchdowns are the only two of that distance in the same game (the previous record was 2 touchdowns of 97 yards in the same game), and the first time a player returned two kickoffs in the same quarter since 1967. Ginn won special-teams player of the month for his efforts. The next game against the New England Patriots, Ginn again dropped several passes that included one in the fourth quarter during a last minute potentially game-tying drive. In the Week 10 game against Tampa Bay, Ginn had zero catches despite several attempts and was ineffective in the return game. Ginn would finish the year fourth in dropped passes.

For the 2009 season, Ginn had 1,826 all-purpose yards, including 1,324 return yards and 502 yards from scrimmage, with two fumbles.

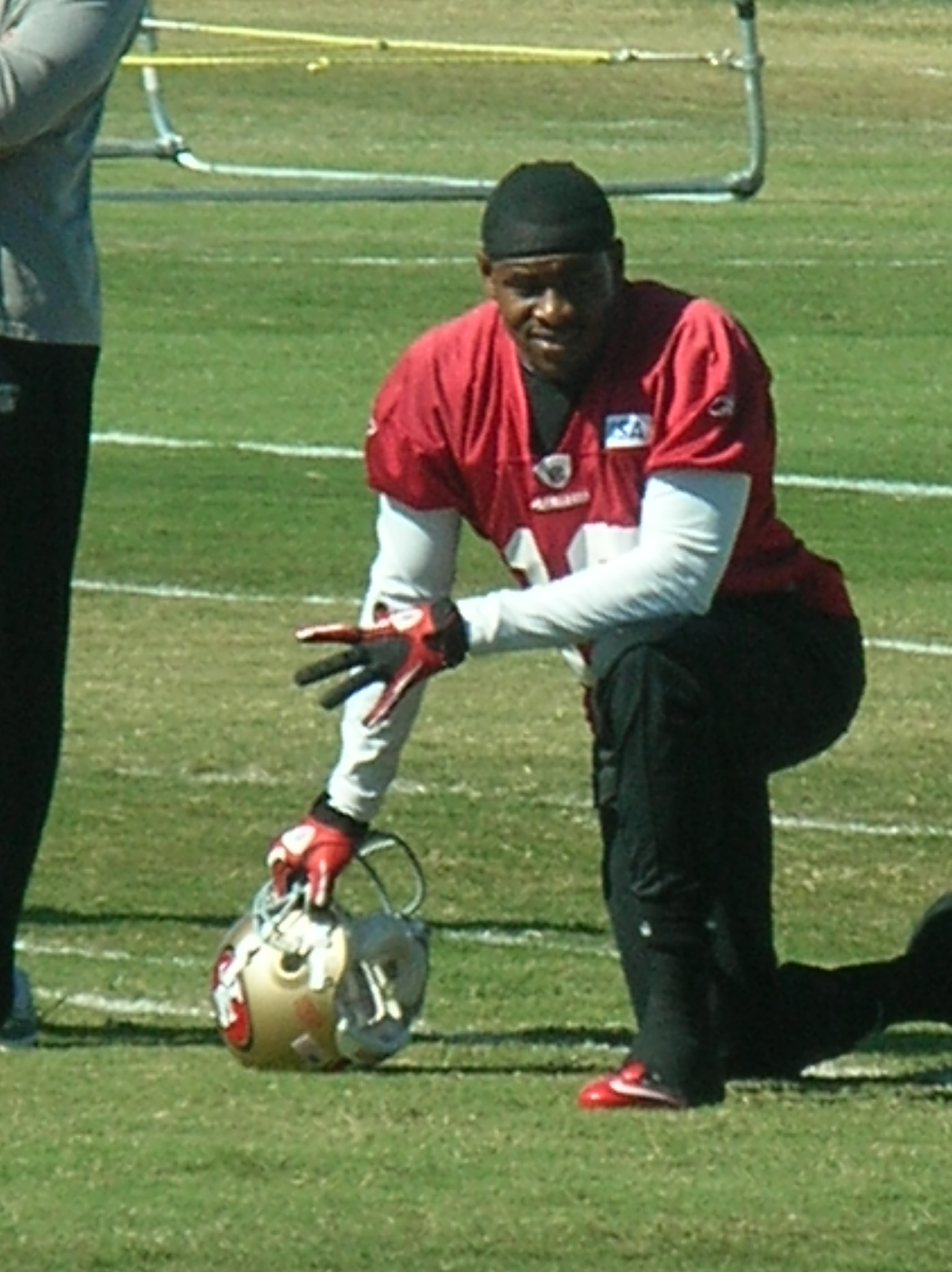
Ginn during 49ers 2010 Training Camp.

=== San Francisco 49ers ===
==== 2010 season ====
On April 16, 2010, Miami traded Ginn to the San Francisco 49ers for a fifth-round pick (Nolan Carroll) in the 2010 NFL draft.

Ginn scored his first touchdown on a punt return against the St. Louis Rams. He caught his only receiving touchdown in the last game at home against the Arizona Cardinals. Ginn finished the 2010 season with 12 receptions, 163 yards, and 1 touchdown. He also ranked second in the league in punt return yards with a 13.3 average.

==== 2011 season ====
Late in the fourth quarter of the 2011 season opener against the Seattle Seahawks, Ginn returned a kickoff for 102 yards and a punt for 55 yards for two touchdowns within 59 seconds for a game total of 268 return yards. For that accomplishment, he earned NFL Special Teams Player of the Week for Week 1. Earlier that week, Ginn had accepted a salary cut from $2.2 million per season to $1 million. An injury late in the season forced the Niners to replace him on kick returns with Kyle Williams, whose mistakes during the NFC Championship Game are widely thought by fans to have cost the 49ers their chance at appearing in Super Bowl XLVI.

==== 2012 season ====
On March 22, 2012, Ginn re-signed with the 49ers on a one-year deal. In the 2012 season, the 49ers finished the season 11–4–1. They reached Super Bowl XLVII where they lost 34–31 to the Baltimore Ravens. On the last play of the Super Bowl, Ginn fielded the free kick and got tackled at the 50-yard line.

=== Carolina Panthers (first stint) ===
On March 21, 2013, Ginn signed a one-year deal with the Carolina Panthers. With Cam Newton as quarterback, Ginn had one of his best seasons. He put up a then career-high five touchdowns on the season, while recording 36 receptions for 556 receiving yards.

=== Arizona Cardinals ===
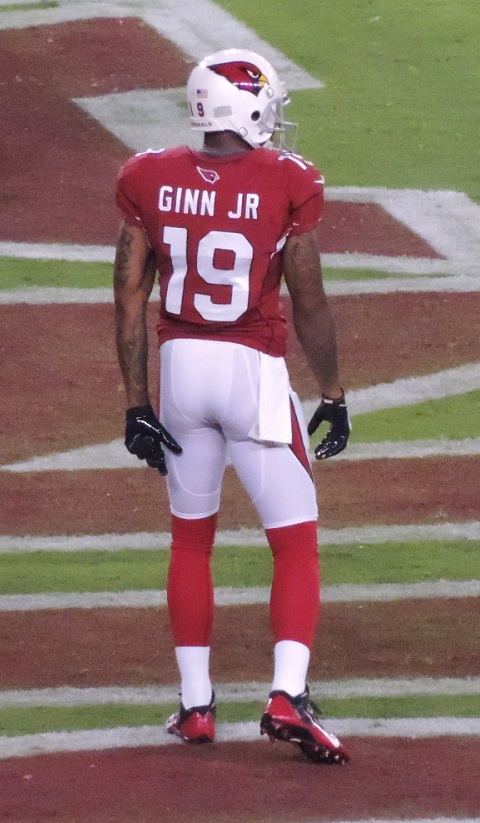
Ted Ginn Jr. while playing for the Cardinals.

On March 13, 2014, Ginn signed a three-year deal with the Arizona Cardinals. He finished the season with 14 receptions for 190 yards, 22 kick returns for 417 net yards, and 26 punt returns for 277 net yards and a punt return touchdown. He was released by the team on February 23, 2015.

=== Carolina Panthers (second stint) ===
==== 2015 season ====
On March 9, 2015, Ginn re-signed with the Carolina Panthers on a two-year contract. During a Week 4 victory against NFC South opponent Tampa Bay Buccaneers, Ginn had a career-high two touchdowns. Through the first four games of the season, Ginn had 12 receptions for 209 yards and three touchdowns, exceeding his total numbers for yards and touchdowns from the year before. Through the first 12 games of the season Ginn had 35 receptions for 525 yards and six touchdowns, including 15.0 yards per receptions. The six touchdown receptions during the season tied his totals from his time with Miami, San Francisco, and Arizona. Ginn finished the season with 44 catches for 739 yards and a career-high 10 touchdowns. Ginn's efforts as a receiver and return specialist helped the Panthers reach Super Bowl 50, where Ginn had four catches for 74 yards and three punt returns. However, the Panthers fell to the Denver Broncos by a score of 24–10.

==== 2016 season ====
Ginn played as a wide receiver and return specialist throughout the 2016 season, amassing 54 receptions for 752 yards and four touchdowns. He finished third on the team in all three categories to go along with recording 593 return yards as the Panthers' leading punt and kick returner.

=== New Orleans Saints ===
On March 9, 2017, Ginn signed a three-year, $11 million contract with the New Orleans Saints.

On September 11, 2017, in the season opener against the Minnesota Vikings on Monday Night Football, Ginn had one rush for five yards and four receptions for 53 yards in his Saints debut. Overall, in the 2017 season, he had 53 receptions for 787 receiving yards and four receiving touchdowns. The Saints made the playoffs and faced off against the Carolina Panthers in the Wild Card Round. In the 31–26 victory, he had four receptions for 115 yards and a touchdown. In the Divisional Round, he had eight receptions for 72 yards in the 29–24 loss to the Minnesota Vikings.

On October 18, 2018, Ginn was placed on injured reserve with a knee injury. He was activated off injured reserve on December 22, 2018. He finished the 2018 season with 17 receptions for 209 yards and two touchdowns.

In Week 1 of the 2019 season against the Houston Texans on Monday Night Football, Ginn made seven catches for 101 yards in the 30–28 win. Ginn finished the 2019 season with 30 receptions for 421 yards and two touchdowns.

=== Chicago Bears ===
On May 4, 2020, Ginn signed a one-year deal with the Chicago Bears. After Bears running back and punt return specialist Tarik Cohen tore his ACL during a Week 3 game against the Atlanta Falcons, Ginn would be Cohen's replacement as the punt returner. He took over the role from Week 4 to Week 7 of the season until the Bears signed Dwayne Harris to take his role. On November 4, 2020, Ginn was released by the Bears.

On July 16, 2021, Ginn announced his retirement from professional football.

== Coaching career ==
On December 17, 2025, Ginn was named the head coach for the Columbus Aviators of the United Football League (UFL). On April 11, 2026, he was arrested for driving under the influence in Tarrant County, Texas, ahead of a game versus the Dallas Renegades. He was released the same day on a $1,000.00 bond. Offensive coordinator Todd Haley served as the interim head coach for the Renegades game.

== Career statistics ==
=== Playing career ===
==== NFL ====
===== Regular season =====
Year	Team	Games		Receiving					Rushing					Kickoff returns					Punt returns				
Year	Team	GP	GS	Rec	Yds	Avg	Lng	TD	Att	Yds	Avg	Lng	TD	Ret	Yds	Avg	Lng	TD	Ret	Yds	Avg	Lng	TD
2007	MIA	**16**	9	34	420	12.4	54	2	4	3	0.8	7	0	**63**	**1,433**	22.7	52	0	24	230	9.6	**87**	**1**
2008	MIA	**16**	**14**	**56**	**790**	14.1	64	2	5	73	14.6	40	**2**	32	657	20.5	41	0	7	54	7.7	15	0
2009	MIA	**16**	12	38	454	11.9	53	1	7	48	6.9	22	0	52	1,296	24.9	101	**2**	5	28	5.6	12	0
2010	SF	13	0	12	163	13.6	37	1	2	11	5.5	9	0	47	992	21.1	61	0	24	321	**13.4**	78	**1**
2011	SF	14	3	19	220	11.6	26	0	8	68	8.5	24	0	29	800	**27.6**	**102**	1	**38**	**466**	12.3	55	**1**
2012	SF	13	0	2	1	0.5	1	0	1	7	7.0	7	0	11	253	23.0	31	0	32	326	10.2	38	0
2013	CAR	**16**	2	36	556	15.4	47	5	4	29	7.3	14	0	25	595	23.8	38	0	26	316	12.2	41	0
2014	ARI	**16**	0	14	190	13.6	27	0	3	6	2.0	4	0	22	417	19.0	43	0	26	277	10.7	71	**1**
2015	CAR	15	13	44	739	**16.8**	74	**10**	4	60	**15.0**	**43**	0	1	8	8.0	8	0	27	277	10.3	37	0
2016	CAR	**16**	8	54	752	13.9	**88**	4	**14**	**98**	7.0	20	0	18	391	21.7	59	0	29	202	7.0	19	0
2017	NO	15	10	53	787	14.8	54	4	10	39	3.9	15	0	5	56	11.2	17	0	19	103	5.4	17	0
2018	NO	5	3	17	209	12.3	42	2	3	26	8.7	20	0	1	1	1.0	1	0	—	—	—	—	—
2019	NO	**16**	9	30	421	14.0	45	2	3	18	6.0	12	0	1	0	0.0	0	0	—	—	—	—	—
2020	CHI	6	0	3	40	13.3	29	0	—	—	—	—	—	—	—	—	—	—	5	24	4.8	10	0
Total		193	83	412	5,742	13.9	88	33	68	486	7.1	43	2	307	6,899	22.5	102	3	262	2,624	10.0	87	4

===== Postseason =====
Year	Team	Games		Receiving					Kickoff returns					Punt returns				
Year	Team	GP	GS	Rec	Yds	Avg	Lng	TD	Ret	Yds	Avg	Lng	TD	Ret	Yds	Avg	Lng	TD
2008	MIA	1	1	5	38	7.6	9	0	1	14	14.0	14	0	—	—	—	—	—
2011	SF	1	0	1	11	11.0	11	0	—	—	—	—	—	2	23	11.5	16	0
2012	SF	3	0	1	3	3.0	3	0	1	31	31.0	31	0	3	52	17.3	32	0
2013	CAR	1	0	4	104	26.0	59	0	3	62	20.7	25	0	2	27	13.5	24	0
2014	ARI	1	0	0	0	0.0	0	0	2	59	29.5	48	0	—	—	—	—	—
2015	CAR	3	0	6	126	21.0	45	0	—	—	—	—	—	6	40	6.7	32	0
2017	NO	2	2	12	187	15.6	80	1	—	—	—	—	—	—	—	—	—	—
2018	NO	2	2	6	102	17.0	43	0	—	—	—	—	—	—	—	—	—	—
2019	NO	1	0	1	18	18.0	18	0	—	—	—	—	—	—	—	—	—	—
Total		15	5	36	589	16.4	59	1	7	166	23.7	48	0	13	142	10.9	32	0

==== College ====
Legend
	Led the NCAA
**Bold**	Career high

Year	Team	Games		Receiving				Rushing				Punt returns				Kick returns			
Year	Team	GP	GS	Rec	Yds	Avg	TD	Att	Yds	Avg	TD	Ret	Yds	Avg	TD	Ret	Yds	Avg	TD
2004	Ohio State	12	5	25	359	14.4	2	**13**	**113**	**8.7**	**2**	15	**384**	**25.6**	**4**	2	40	20.0	0
2005	Ohio State	12	12	51	**803**	**15.7**	4	12	83	6.9	1	**25**	250	10.0	1	**18**	**532**	**29.6**	**1**
2006	Ohio State	**13**	**13**	**59**	781	13.2	**9**	3	17	5.7	0	24	266	11.1	1	**18**	440	24.4	**1**
Career		37	30	135	1,943	14.4	15	28	213	7.6	3	64	900	14.1	6	38	1,012	26.6	2

=== Head coaching record ===
Team	Year	Regular season					Postseason			
Team	Year	Won	Lost	Ties	Win %	Finish	Won	Lost	Win %	Result
CLB*	2026	3	6	0	.333	8th	—	—	—	—
Total		3	6	0	.333		–	–	–	

*Did not coach for Week 3 game against the Dallas Renegades.

== Career highlights ==
=== Awards and honors ===
NFL

- PFWA All-Rookie Team (2007)

College

- 2004 NCAA average punt return yards leader
- 2004 First-team All-American as a returner by SI.com, Pro Football Weekly, and Rivals.com
- 2005 Honorable mention All-Big Ten
- 2005 First-team All-American as a returner by Rivals.com
- 2006 First-team All-American as an All-Purpose player by Rivals.com
- 2006 Second-team All-American as an All-Purpose player by AP
- 2006 First-team All-Big Ten

High school

- USA Today Defensive Player of the Year (2003)
- Parade All-American (2003)
- Pete Dawkins Trophy (2004)

=== Records ===
==== NFL records ====
- Two kickoff return touchdowns of 100 yards or more in a single game (tied with Josh Cribbs)

==== Panthers franchise records ====
As of 2017's NFL off-season, Ginn held at least six Panthers franchise records, including:

- Punt returns: playoffs (8), playoff season (6 in 2015), playoff game (3 on February 7, 2016, in Super Bowl 50 against the Denver Broncos)
- Punt return yards: playoff season (40 in 2015)
- Yards/punt return: playoff season (6.67 in 2015; min. 4 returns)
- Total return yards: playoffs (129)

==== Dolphins franchise records ====
- Most kickoff return touchdowns in a single game: 2 (2009)
- Most kickoff returns in a single season: 63 (2007)

== Personal life ==
Ginn has admitted that he has a learning disability, and it takes him two to three times longer to learn something than most people. After being diagnosed in the eighth grade, Ginn had tutors to help him and he graduated from middle and high school with honors.
