= Columbus Aviators =

UFL (2024) team based in Columbus, Ohio

- Current season
Logo	Wordmark
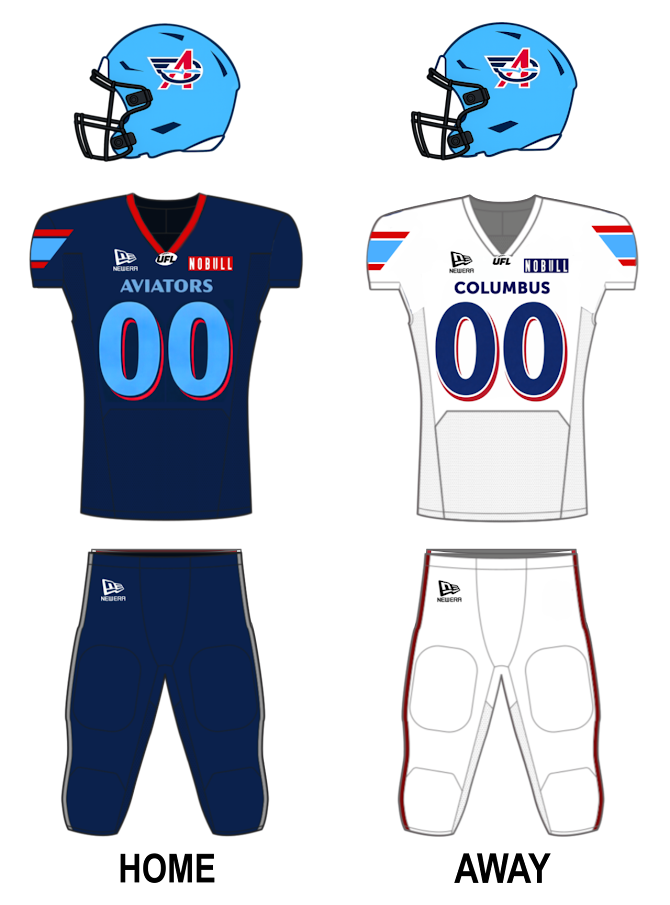
- Uniforms

General information
- Founded: October 7, 2025; 13 months ago
- Stadium: Historic Crew Stadium; Columbus, Ohio
- Colors: Navy, Aviator blue, red, white
- Mascot: Maverick
- Website: www.theufl.com/columbus

Personnel
- Owner: League owned
- Head coach: Ted Ginn Jr.

Team history
- Columbus Aviators (2026–present)

Home fields
- Historic Crew Stadium (2026–)

League / conference affiliations
- United Football League (2026–present)

The Columbus Aviators are a professional American football team based in Columbus, Ohio. The Aviators compete in the United Football League (UFL). The team began play on March 29, 2026, and is currently owned and operated by a consortium led by Mike Repole. The Aviators play their home games at Historic Crew Stadium, in Columbus, Ohio.

== History ==
The team was announced in July 2025, following the UFL's intended relocation of multiple teams. On October 7, 2025, it was announced that the team would be called the Columbus Aviators, due to the region's tie with the aeronautics industry and the state of Ohio's slogan as the "birthplace of aviation." The Aviators brand was the last holdover trademark the UFL had from one of its corporate predecessors, The Spring League; the Web site UFL News Hub had accurately predicted the establishment of a Columbus Aviators team as early as April. On December 17, 2025, the Aviators named former Ohio State Buckeye and NFL Wide Receiver Ted Ginn Jr. as the team's head coach.

== Market overview ==
The Aviators are the only professional football team in Columbus, and the first professional outdoor team to play in the region since the short-lived Ohio Glory in the World League, which played one season in 1992. Columbus is home to three major professional sports teams: Columbus Crew in Major League Soccer, Columbus Blue Jackets in National Hockey League, and Columbus Fury in Major League Volleyball. Additionally, Columbus is home to two minor league teams, Columbus Crew 2 (soccer) and the Columbus Clippers (AAA baseball), in MLS Next Pro and the International League, respectively.

The market is also heavily influenced by the collegiate teams from Ohio State University, the Buckeyes. Repole expressed a desire to recruit heavily from Ohio State alumni for the team and hired XFL and Ohio State alumnus Cardale Jones as a community ambassador, a role Jones stated that he "had no clue what that means" but hoped would involve a say in the team's "back-end decision-making."

== Current roster ==
=== Players ===
Columbus Aviators roster
Quarterbacks (QB): 8 Jalan McClendon; 2 Jalen Morton; 12 Aidan Sayin; Running backs (RB): 5 John Lovett; 35 Toa Taua; 4 ZaQuandre White; Wide receivers (WR): -- Jayden Ballard; 17 Yulkeith Brown; 3 Keke Chism; 14 Rashard Davis; -- Qian Magwood; 7 Jaylon Moore; 0 Devin Ross; -- Jake Thaw; 85 Easop Winston Jr.; Tight ends (TE): -- James Faulkner; 88 Alizé Mack; 87 Camren McDonald; 84 Gunnar Oakes	Offensive linemen (OL): 69 Cohl Cabral LG; 71 Matt Farniok C; 77 Chuck Filiaga RG; 58 Bless Harris RT; -- Ryan Johnson G; 67 Aaron Monteiro RT; 75 Ryan Nelson LT; 65 Wisdom Quarshie RG; Defensive linemen (DL): 45 Celestin Haba DE; 99 Walter Palmore DT; 96 Caeveon Patton DT; 97 Syrus Webster DE; 48 Kenny Willekes DE	Linebackers (LB): 30 Xavier Benson ILB; 10 Noah Dawkins ILB; 20 Storey Jackson ILB; 11 Fred Thompkins ILB; 57 Jailin Walker ILB; Defensive backs (DB): 33 Henry Black SS; 24 Elijah Blades CB; 15 Akeem Dent FS; -- Dequan Finn FS; 13 O'Donnell Fortune CB; 22 Tre'von Jones CB; 41 Michael Lawson FS; -- Darrian Lewis SS; -- Markel Linzer SS; 27 Smoke Monday CB; 23 Nehemiah Shelton CB; 9 Cam Smith CB; 32 Kedrick Whitehead Jr. FS; 28 Kyree Woods CB; Special teams (ST): 50 Payton Bunch LS; 14 Jonah Dalmas K; 83 Brad Robbins P	54 active As of October 23, 2026. Rookies in italics.: Roster

=== Staff ===
Columbus Aviators staff
Head coach: Head coach – Ted Ginn Jr.; Offensive coaches: Offensive coordinator – Todd Haley; Running backs – Bob Saunders; Wide receivers – Tito Overton; Offensive line – Ronnie Vinklarek	Defensive coaches: Defensive coordinator – Captain Munnerlyn; Defensive line – Curtis Terry; Linebackers – Larry Grant; Defensive backs – Rasul Spain

== Player history ==
=== Current NFL players ===
Season	Pos	Name	NFL team
2026	DE	Jacoby Windmon	Pittsburgh Steelers
2026	WR	Tay Martin	Detroit Lions
2026	WR	Antwane Wells Jr.	Atlanta Falcons
2026	LB	Tony Fields II	Chicago Bears

=== Notable players ===
Season	Pos	Name	Notes
2026–present	CB	Cam Smith	Former Miami Dolphins Cornerback, 2023 2nd Round Pick

== Coach history ==
=== Head coaches ===
#	Coach	Term	Regular season				Playoffs			Awards
#	Coach	Term	GC	W	L	Win %	GC	W	L	Awards
Columbus Aviators
1	Ted Ginn Jr.	2026–present	9	3	6	.333	—	—	—	—
—	Todd Haley	2026*	1	0	1	.000	—	—	—	—

*Haley served as Week 3 interim Head Coach.

=== Offensive coordinators ===
#	Coach	Term	Regular season				Playoffs			Awards
#	Coach	Term	GC	W	L	Win %	GC	W	L	Awards
Columbus Aviators
1	Todd Haley	2026–present	10	3	7	.300	—	—	—	—

=== Defensive coordinators ===
#	Coach	Term	Regular season				Playoffs			Awards
#	Coach	Term	GC	W	L	Win %	GC	W	L	Awards
Columbus Aviators
1	Captain Munnerlyn	2026–present	10	3	7	.300	—	—	—	—

== Season by season record ==
UFL champions^{†} (2024–present)	Conference champions^{*}	Division champions^{^}	Wild Card berth^{#}

Season	Team	League	Conference	Division	Regular season			Postseason results	Awards	Head coaches	Pct.
Season	Team	League	Conference	Division	Finish	W	L	Postseason results	Awards	Head coaches	Pct.
2026	2026	UFL	—N/a	—N/a	8th	3	7	—	—	Ted Ginn Jr. Todd Haley	.300
Total						3	7	All-time regular season record (2026–)			.300
Total						0	0	All-time postseason record (2026–)			–
Total						3	7	All-time regular season and postseason record (2026–)			.300

=== Franchise matchup history ===
As of 2026 UFL season

Team	Record	Pct.
Birmingham Stallions	1–1	.500
Dallas Renegades	1–1	.500
DC Defenders	0–1	.000
Houston Gamblers	1–1	.500
Louisville Kings	0–1	.000
Orlando Storm	0–1	.000
St. Louis Battlehawks	0–1	.000

== Records ==
All-time Aviators leaders
Leader	Player	Record	Years with Aviators
Passing yards	Jalan McClendon	1,376 yds	2026–present
Passing touchdowns	Jalan McClendon	8 TDs	2026–present
Rushing yards	Toa Taua	311 yds	2026–present
Rushing touchdowns	ZaQuandre White	4 TDs	2026–present
Receiving yards	Tay Martin	483 yds	2026–present
Receiving touchdowns	Keke Chism	3 TDs	2026–present
Receptions	Tay Martin	42 recs	2026–present
Tackles	Tony Fields II	77 tackles	2026–present
Sacks	Ron Stone	5.5 sacks	2026–present
Interceptions	DJ Miller Jr	3 int.	2026–present
Coaching wins	Ted Ginn Jr.	3 wins	2026–present
