= O'Donnell Fortune =

American football player (born 2001)

No. 13 – Columbus Aviators
- Position: Cornerback
- Roster status: Active

Personal information
- Born: September 8, 2001 (age 25); Sumter, South Carolina, U.S.
- Listed height: 6 ft 1 in (1.85 m)
- Listed weight: 189 lb (86 kg)

Career information
- High school: Sumter (SC)
- College: South Carolina (2020–2024)
- NFL draft: 2025: undrafted

Career history
- New York Giants (2025)*; Columbus Aviators (2026–present)
- * Offseason or practice squad member only
- Stats at Pro Football Reference

O'Donnell Fortune (born September 8, 2001) is an American professional football cornerback for the Columbus Aviators of the United Football League (UFL). He played college football for the South Carolina Gamecocks.

== Early life ==
Fortune attended Sumter High School in Sumter, South Carolina. As a junior, he recorded 42 tackles and five interceptions. Coming out of high school, Fortune committed to play college football for the South Carolina Gamecocks over other schools such as Syracuse, Kansas, UNC Charlotte, Colorado, Elon, Liberty and UCF.

== College career ==
In his first two collegiate season in 2020 and 2021, Fortune had six tackles and a fumble recovery in 11 games. He made his first career start in the teams 2022 bowl game due to opt outs. In the 2022 Gator Bowl, Fortune returned an interception 100 yards for a touchdown versus Notre Dame. In 2022, he appeared in nine games, recording 16 tackles, two interceptions, a forced fumble, and a touchdown. Heading into the Gamecocks week 12 match up in 2023, Fortune was suspended from the team due to a violation of team rules. He finished the 2023 season, appearing in 11 games where he made ten starts, recording 39 tackle with one being for a loss, eight pass deflections, and two interceptions.

In 2024, Fortune totaled 47 tackles and three pass deflections, earning honorable mention all-SEC honors. After the season, he declared for the 2025 NFL draft and accepted an invite to participate in the 2025 East-West Shrine Bowl. Fortune earned bowl game MVP honors after returning an interception 65 yards return for a touchdown.

== Professional career ==
Pre-draft measurables
Height	Weight	Arm length	Hand span	Wingspan	40-yard dash	10-yard split	20-yard split	20-yard shuttle	Three-cone drill	Vertical jump	Broad jump	Bench press
6 ft 0 3/4 in (1.85 m)	185 lb (84 kg)	31 1/2 in (0.80 m)	9 1/4 in (0.23 m)	6 ft 4 7/8 in (1.95 m)	4.58 s	1.57 s	2.72 s	4.47 s	7.40 s	33.5 in (0.85 m)	9 ft 10 in (3.00 m)	13 reps
All values from NFL Combine/Pro Day

=== New York Giants ===
On May 9, 2025, Fortune signed with the New York Giants as an undrafted free agent after going unselected in the 2025 NFL draft. He was released on August 22.

=== Columbus Aviators ===
On February 11, 2026, Fortune signed with the Columbus Aviators of the United Football League (UFL).
