= Aidan Sayin =

American football player (born 2002)

No. 12 – Columbus Aviators
- Position: Quarterback
- Roster status: Active

Personal information
- Born: March 24, 2002 (age 24); Carlsbad, California, U.S.
- Listed height: 6 ft 2 in (1.88 m)
- Listed weight: 200 lb (91 kg)

Career information
- High school: Carlsbad
- College: Penn (2021–2024)
- NFL draft: 2025: undrafted

Career history
- Columbus Aviators (2026–present)
- Stats at ESPN

Aidan Sayin (born March 24, 2002) is an American professional football quarterback for the Columbus Aviators of the United Football League (UFL). He played college football for the Penn Quakers.

== Early life ==
Sayin attended Carlsbad High School in Carlsbad, California, and became the starting quarterback for the Lancers as a junior in 2019. That season, he threw for 2,349 yards, 24 touchdowns, and eight interceptions and led the Lancers to a 10–2 (6–0) record and an Avocado League championship. Due to the COVID-19 pandemic, the 2020 season was cut short to only five games, in which he threw for 962 yards and 13 touchdowns. Sayin led the Lancers to another Avocado League championship with a 5–0 (4–0) record. He committed to the University of Pennsylvania over Cornell.

College recruiting
Name	Hometown	School	Height	Weight	Commit date
Aidan Sayin; QB	Carlsbad, CA	Carlsbad High School	6 ft 2 in (1.88 m)	185 lb (84 kg)	Sep 6, 2020
Aidan Sayin; QB	Recruit ratings: 247Sports:				

== College career ==
=== 2021 season ===
Sayin started the 2021 season as the backup to senior, John Quinnelly. Sayin saw his first action against the Yale Bulldogs after an injury to Quinnelly. He finished 12-for-28, 114 yards, and two touchdowns. Sayin's final game of the season was against Princeton, passing for 255 yards, a touchdown, and two interceptions. Starting the last five games of the season, Sayin passed for 920 yards on 163 attempts to 88 completions, and five touchdowns to seven interceptions.

=== 2022 season ===
Sayin was named the starter going into the 2022 season. In the season opener, he passed for 289 yards and two touchdowns in a 25–14 victory. Against Dartmouth, Sayin threw for 204 yards and a touchdown in 23–17 double-overtime win. Against Georgetown, he accounted for five total touchdowns, which was the most by a Quaker since 2010, in a 59–28 win. Against No. 22 Princeton, Sayin led a fourth-quarter comeback to win, 20–19. During the game, he completed 38 passes, second-most in program history, for 261 yards and two touchdowns, earning Ivy League Offensive Player of the Week honors for his efforts. Sayin finished the season with 253 completions (1st Ivy), 2,344 yards (2nd), and 18 touchdowns (T–1st). His passing yardage was fifth most in program history and the most since Alek Torgersen had 2,689 yards in 2014. Sayin was named All-Ivy honorable mention. He was also named to the College Sports Communicators Academic All-District Team.

=== College statistics ===
Year	Team	Games			Passing								Rushing			
Year	Team	GP	GS	Record	Cmp	Att	Pct	Yds	Avg	TD	Int	Rtg	Att	Yds	Avg	TD
2021	Penn	5	5	1–4	88	163	54.0	920	5.6	5	7	-	25	–6	–0.2	0
2022	Penn	10	10	8–2	253	390	64.9	2,344	6.0	18	7	-	46	–30	–0.7	2
2023	Penn	10	10	6–4	278	430	64.7	2,805	6.5	16	12	-	43	34	0.8	0
2024	Penn	6	6	2–4	100	168	59.5	1,108	6.6	6	5	-	20	16	0.8	2
Career		31	31	17–14	719	1,151	62.5	7,177	6.2	45	31	-	134	14	0.1	4

== Professional career ==
Pre-draft measurables
Height	Weight
6 ft 1 5/8 in (1.87 m)	210 lb (95 kg)
Values from Pro Day

On February 10, 2026, Sayin was signed by the Columbus Aviators of the United Football League (UFL).

== Coaching career ==
Sayin signed with Athletes Untapped as a private football coach on Sep 4, 2022.

== Personal life ==
Sayin's younger brother, Julian, is the starting quarterback for the Ohio State Buckeyes. His older sister, Bailey, played soccer at the University of Chicago.
