= Storey Jackson =

American football player (born 1998)

Profile
- Position: Linebacker

Personal information
- Born: April 8, 1998 (age 28); Kansas City, Kansas, U.S.
- Listed height: 6 ft 2 in (1.88 m)
- Listed weight: 228 lb (103 kg)

Career information
- High school: Olathe North (Olathe, Kansas)
- College: Hutchinson Community College; Prairie View A&M; Liberty
- NFL draft: 2022: undrafted

Career history
- Dallas Cowboys (2022)*; Cleveland Browns (2022); Arlington Renegades (2024); Atlanta Falcons (2024)*; Arlington Renegades (2025); San Antonio Brahmas (2025); Columbus Aviators (2026)
- * Offseason or practice squad member only

Awards and highlights
- Second-team FCS All-American (2021); All-SWAC (2021)

Career NFL statistics
- Games played: 1
- Stats at Pro Football Reference

Storey Jackson (born April 8, 1998) is an American professional football linebacker. He played college football at Liberty University.

== Early life ==
Jackson attended Olathe North High School, where he lettered in football, basketball and baseball.

He enrolled at Hutchinson Community College. In two seasons, he appeared in 19 games as a defensive back. His sophomore year he played safety and led the team with 75 tackles and one interception. As a junior in 2019, he transferred to Prairie View A&M University. He was switched to linebacker, tallying 72 tackles (8.5 for loss) and four sacks while only playing 8 out of 10 games. In 2020, the Southwestern Athletic Conference announced that it would not play fall sports due to the COVID-19 pandemic. As a senior in the SWAC shortened spring season in 2021, he had 50 tackles (8.5 for loss), 2 sacks, 2 forced fumbles, 2 fumble recoveries and one interception. In a schedule with three games, he led the nation in tackles-per-game (16.7). In 2021, he transferred to Liberty University. As a fifth-year senior, he appeared in 13 games with 12 starts and became the leader of the defense. He posted 102 tackles (13 for loss), seven sacks, one interception and four passes defensed.

== Professional career ==
Pre-draft measurables
Height	Weight	Arm length	Hand span	Wingspan	40-yard dash	10-yard split	20-yard split	20-yard shuttle	Three-cone drill	Vertical jump	Broad jump	Bench press
6 ft 1 7/8 in (1.88 m)	224 lb (102 kg)	30 3/8 in (0.77 m)	10 1/8 in (0.26 m)	6 ft 3 1/2 in (1.92 m)	4.68 s	1.69 s	2.63 s	4.32 s	6.97 s	32.0 in (0.81 m)	9 ft 4 in (2.84 m)	23 reps
All values from Pro Day

=== Dallas Cowboys ===
Jackson was signed as an undrafted free agent by the Dallas Cowboys after the 2022 NFL draft on May 12. On August 30, during final roster cuts, the Cowboys released Jackson.

=== Cleveland Browns ===
On December 13, 2022, Jackson signed with the Cleveland Browns' practice squad. On January 7, 2023, the Browns elevated Jackson to the active roster. The next day, he made his NFL debut playing fifteen snaps against the Pittsburgh Steelers. He signed a reserve/future contract on January 9, 2023. He was waived on May 15, 2023.

=== Arlington Renegades (first stint) ===
On October 20, 2023, Jackson signed with the Arlington Renegades of the XFL. His contract was terminated on August 14, 2024, to sign with an NFL team.

=== Atlanta Falcons ===
On August 14, 2024, Jackson signed with the Atlanta Falcons. He was waived on August 25.

=== Arlington Renegades (second stint) ===
On December 16, 2024, Jackson re-signed with the Renegades.

=== San Antonio Brahmas ===
On April 29, 2025, Jackson was traded to the San Antonio Brahmas.

=== Columbus Aviators ===
On January 13, 2026, Jackson was selected by the Columbus Aviators in the 2026 UFL Draft.
