= Jaylon Moore (wide receiver) =

American football player (born 1997)

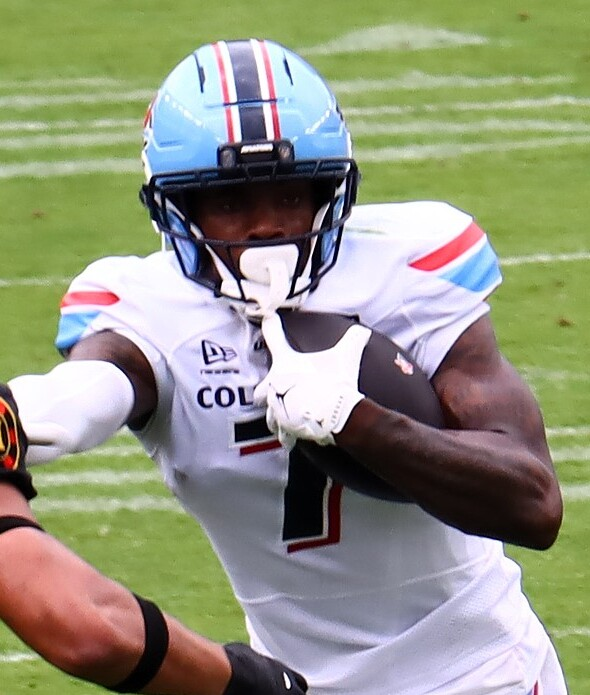
- Moore with the Columbus Aviators in 2026

Profile
- Position: Wide receiver

Personal information
- Born: July 1, 1997 (age 29); Memphis, Tennessee, U.S.
- Listed height: 5 ft 11 in (1.80 m)
- Listed weight: 198 lb (90 kg)

Career information
- High school: Mitchell (Memphis, Tennessee)
- College: Tennessee-Martin (2016-2019)
- NFL draft: 2020: undrafted

Career history
- Baltimore Ravens (2020–2022)*; New York Giants (2022)*; Jacksonville Jaguars (2022–2023)*; Michigan Panthers (2025); Columbus Aviators (2026)
- * Offseason or practice squad member only
- Stats at Pro Football Reference

Jaylon Moore (born July 1, 1997) is an American football wide receiver. He played college football for the UT Martin Skyhawks and was signed by the Baltimore Ravens as an undrafted free agent in 2020.

== College career ==
Moore played college football at UT Martin. In his UT Martin career he had 92 receptions for a total of 1492 receiving yards and 18 receiving touchdowns.

== Professional career ==
Pre-draft measurables
Height	Weight	Arm length	Hand span	Wingspan
5 ft 11 1/2 in (1.82 m)	191 lb (87 kg)	32 3/4 in (0.83 m)	9 1/4 in (0.23 m)	6 ft 5 3/4 in (1.97 m)
All values from Pro Day

=== Baltimore Ravens ===
Moore went undrafted during the 2020 NFL draft. On April 26, 2020, Moore signed with the Baltimore Ravens as an undrafted free agent. When Moore was signed by the Baltimore Ravens he became the only UT Martin player signed by an NFL team for the season. On September 5, 2020, Moore was released by the Baltimore Ravens, and on the next day Moore was signed by the Ravens practice squad. Moore was never re-elevated to the 53-man active roster and remained on the practice squad the rest of the season. On January 18, 2021, Moore signed a reserves/future deal with the Baltimore Ravens.

On May 17, 2021, it was confirmed that Jaylon Moore would be switching from No. 81 to No. 10. Moore made his preseason debut on August 14, 2021 against the New Orleans Saints. He finished as the Ravens leading receiver with two catches for 32 yards. On August 31, 2021, Moore was released by the Ravens. He was subsequently signed to the practice squad a day later. He signed a reserve/future contract with the Ravens on January 10, 2022.

On August 23, 2022, Moore was waived by the Ravens.

=== New York Giants ===
On August 24, 2022, Moore was claimed off waivers by the New York Giants. He was waived on August 30 and signed to the practice squad the next day. On September 1, the Giants waived Moore.

=== Jacksonville Jaguars ===
On September 4, 2022, Moore was signed to the Jacksonville Jaguars practice squad. He signed a reserve/future contract on January 23, 2023. He was placed on injured reserve on May 17, 2023.

=== Michigan Panthers ===
On October 2, 2024, Moore signed with the Michigan Panthers of the United Football League (UFL).

On July 4, 2025, Moore re-signed with the Panthers.

=== Columbus Aviators ===
On January 13, 2026, Taua was selected by the Columbus Aviators in the 2026 UFL Draft.
