= Nehemiah Shelton =

American football player (born 1999)

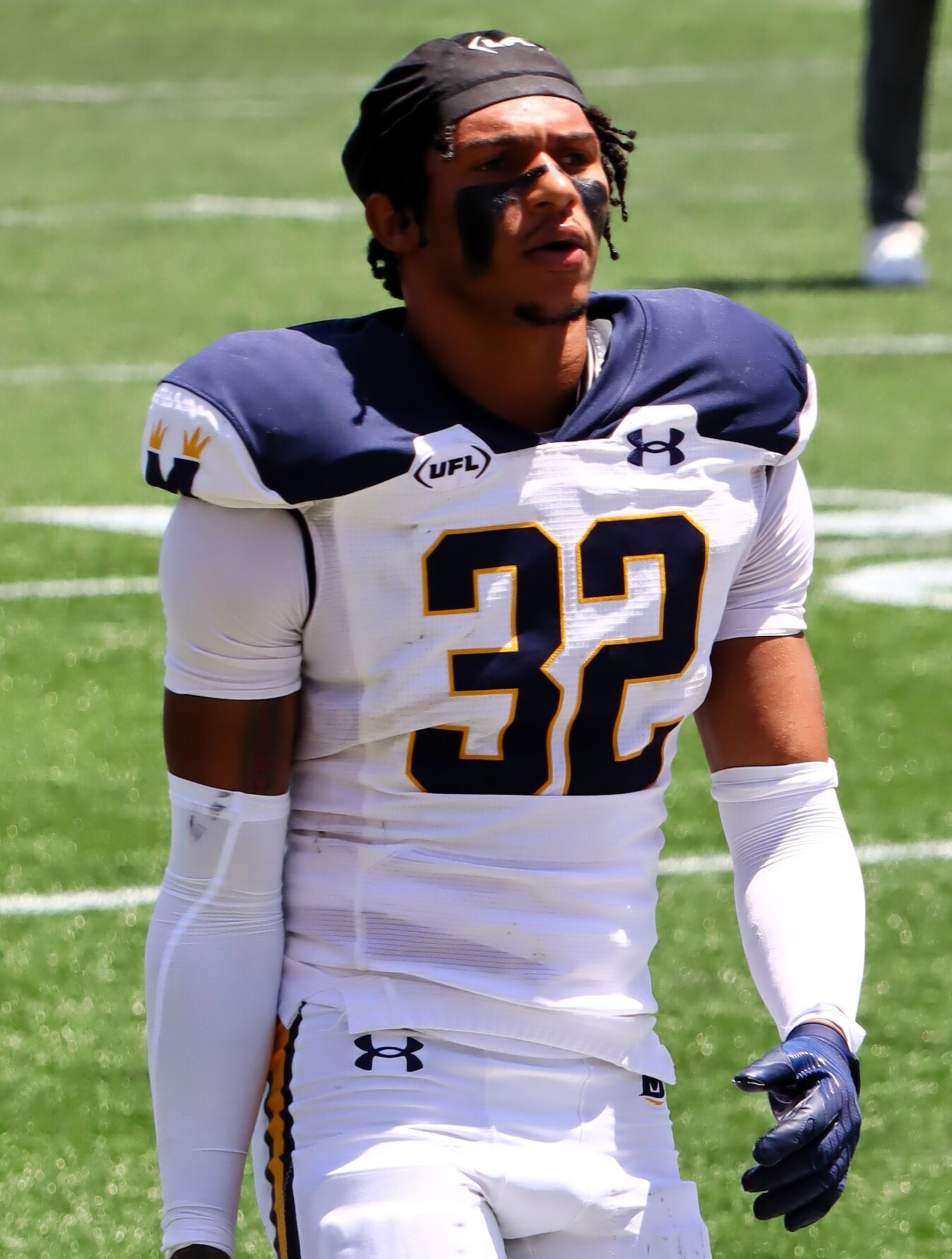
- Shelton with the Memphis Showboats in 2025

No. 23 – Columbus Aviators
- Position: Cornerback
- Roster status: Active

Personal information
- Born: September 13, 1999 (age 27); Gardena, California, U.S.
- Listed height: 6 ft 2 in (1.88 m)
- Listed weight: 185 lb (84 kg)

Career information
- High school: Junípero Serra (Gardena)
- College: Long Beach CC (2017); San Jose State (2018–2022)
- NFL draft: 2023: undrafted

Career history
- Memphis Showboats (2023); New York Jets (2023)*; Memphis Showboats (2024); New York Jets (2024)*; Los Angeles Chargers (2024)*; Memphis Showboats (2025)*; Los Angeles Chargers (2025)*; Columbus Aviators (2026–present)
- * Offseason or practice squad member only

Awards and highlights
- 2x All-MWC Honorable Mention selection (2021-22); Second-team Preseason Athlon All-MWC selection (2022); First-team All-Central League (2017)
- Stats at Pro Football Reference

Nehemiah Shelton (born September 13, 1999) is an American professional football cornerback for the Columbus Aviators of the United Football League (UFL). He played college football for the Long Beach City Vikings and the San Jose State Spartans.

== Early life ==
Nehemiah Shelton grew up in Gardena, California, and attended Junípero Serra High School. During his high school career, he played as a cornerback and a wide receiver and made three pass interceptions and seven pass break-ups as a senior. Also as a senior, he played in the 2017 Lions All-Star Game in El Segundo, California. Shelton would commit to Long Beach City College.

== College career ==
=== Long Beach City ===
During his true freshman season, he played in 11 games, finishing the season with 46 total tackles (35 solo and 11 assisted), three tackles for loss for seven yards, four interceptions for 43 yards and seven pass break-ups. He was also a first-team All-Central league selection for helping the Vikings win the 2017 Patriotic Bowl.

=== San Jose State ===
On December 20, 2017, Shelton committed to play college football at San Jose State University.

During the 2018 season, he saw action in three games as a reserve cornerback. He finished the season with four tackles, a pass interception and a pass breakup. During the 2019 season, he played in all 12 games and started eight of them, finishing the season with 42 total tackles (34 solo and eight assisted), three pass interceptions for 14 yards, seven pass breakups, a fumble recovery for 27 yards and two forced fumbles. During the 2020 season, he played in and started all eight games, finishing the season with 38 total tackles (31 solo and seven assisted), a tackle for loss, four pass breakups and one fumble recovery for 29 yards. During the 2021 season, he played in and started 10 games, finishing the season with 62 total tackles (47 solo and 15 assisted), two pass interceptions for 13 yards and 12 pass breakups. During the 2022 season, he played in and started all 12 games, finishing the season with 49 total tackles (36 solo and 13 assisted), three tackles for loss, two pass interceptions for 23 yards and eight pass breakups.

Shelton was invited to play at the 2023 East–West Shrine Bowl.

== Professional career ==
Pre-draft measurables
Height	Weight	Arm length	Hand span	Wingspan	40-yard dash	10-yard split	20-yard split	20-yard shuttle	Three-cone drill	Vertical jump	Broad jump	Bench press
6 ft 0 1/8 in (1.83 m)	183 lb (83 kg)	31 7/8 in (0.81 m)	9 1/4 in (0.23 m)	6 ft 5 7/8 in (1.98 m)	4.77 s	1.65 s	2.72 s	4.36 s	7.11 s	35 in (0.89 m)	9 ft 4 in (2.84 m)	6 reps
All values from Pro Day

=== Memphis Showboats ===
Shelton was selected in the seventh round (51st overall) of the 2023 USFL draft by the Memphis Showboats.

=== New York Jets ===
On August 17, 2023, Shelton was signed to the New York Jets as an undrafted free agent after going unselected in the 2023 NFL draft. He was waived on August 29, 2023, but he was signed to the practice squad the next day. He was released on October 3, 2023.

=== Memphis Showboats (second stint) ===
On October 18, 2023, Shelton was re-signed to the Memphis Showboats.

=== New York Jets (second stint) ===
On July 22, 2024, Shelton was re-signed to the New York Jets. He was waived five days later, after the team signed Kendall Sheffield. He was re-signed to the team on August 19, 2024. He was waived on August 27, 2024.

=== Los Angeles Chargers ===
On October 9, 2024, Shelton was signed to the Los Angeles Chargers practice squad. He was released on October 19.

=== Memphis Showboats (third stint) ===
On January 20, 2025, Shelton re-signed with the Memphis Showboats.

=== Los Angeles Chargers (second stint) ===
Shelton re-signed with the Los Angeles Chargers on August 13, 2025. He was waived on August 26.

=== Columbus Aviators ===
On January 13, 2026, Shelton was selected by the Columbus Aviators in the 2026 UFL Draft.
