= Celestin Haba =

American gridiron football player (born 1996)

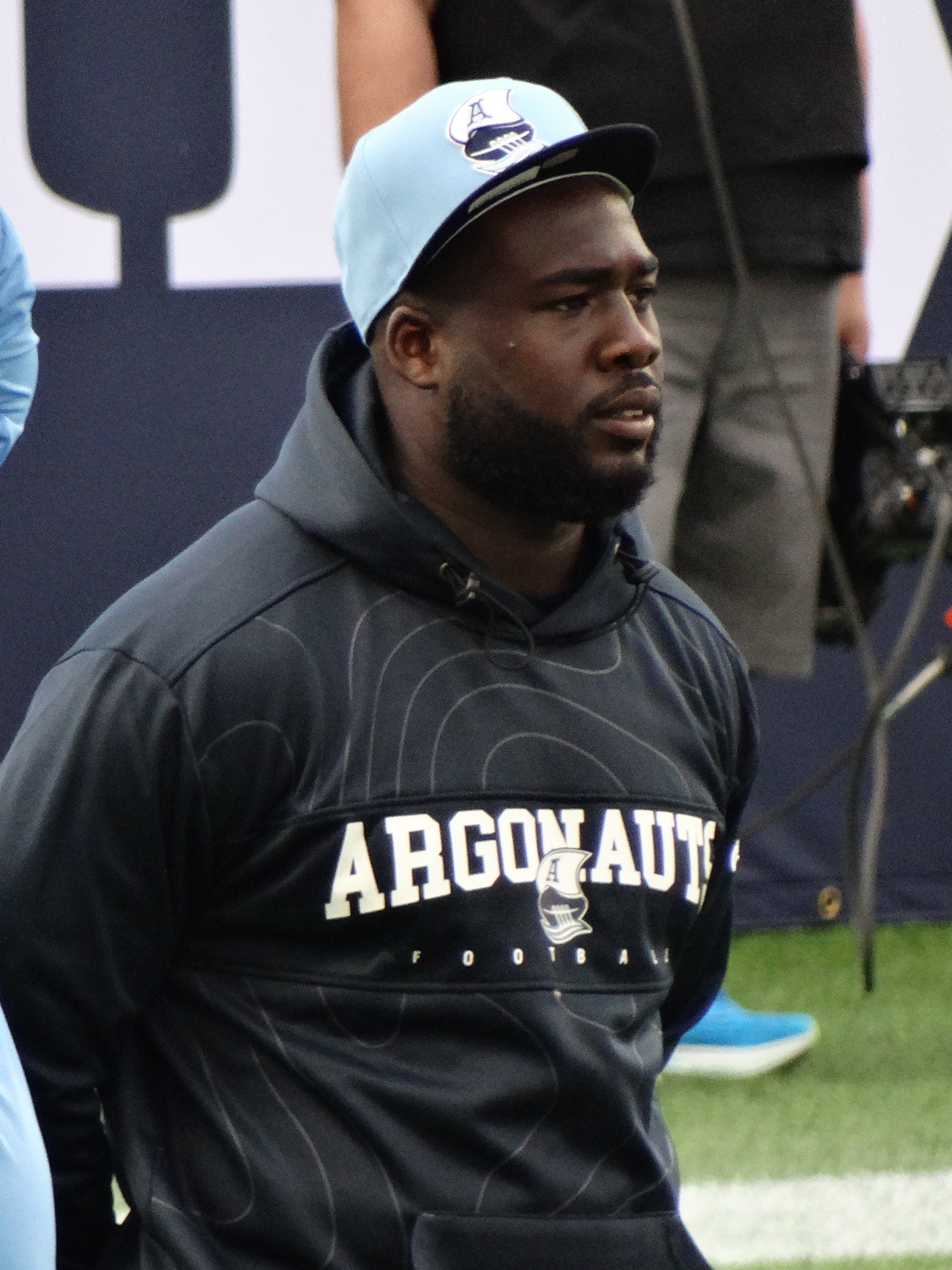
- Haba with the Toronto Argonauts in 2025

No. 45 – Columbus Aviators
- Position: Defensive end
- Roster status: Active

Personal information
- Born: August 16, 1999 (age 27); Columbia, South Carolina, U.S.
- Listed height: 6 ft 2 in (1.88 m)
- Listed weight: 250 lb (113 kg)

Career information
- High school: A. C. Flora High School
- College: Texas A&M University–Commerce

Career history
- 2023–2024: Winnipeg Blue Bombers
- 2025: Toronto Argonauts
- 2025: BC Lions*
- 2026–present: Columbus Aviators
- * Offseason or practice squad member only

Celestin Haba (born August 16, 1999) is an American professional football defensive end for the Columbus Aviators of the United Football League (UFL). He was most recently a member of the BC Lions of the Canadian Football League (CFL).

== Professional career ==
Pre-draft measurables
Height	Weight	Arm length	Hand span	Wingspan	40-yard dash	10-yard split	20-yard shuttle	Three-cone drill	Vertical jump	Broad jump	Bench press
6 ft 1 3/4 in (1.87 m)	243 lb (110 kg)	32 1/4 in (0.82 m)	9 3/4 in (0.25 m)	6 ft 4 1/2 in (1.94 m)	4.69 s	1.67 s	4.41 s	7.79 s	37.5 in (0.95 m)	9 ft 10 in (3.00 m)	23 reps
All values from Pro Day

=== Winnipeg Blue Bombers ===
Haba joined the Winnipeg Blue Bombers on May 30, 2023, and made the roster on the opening day game on June 10. In his first game, Haba sacked Bo Levi Mitchell on the Hamilton Tiger-Cats final possession which essentially ended the game in a win for Winnipeg. He became a free agent upon the expiry of his contract on February 11, 2025.

=== Toronto Argonauts ===
On February 11, 2025, it was announced that Haba had signed with the Toronto Argonauts. He played in three of the first five games of the regular season, recording three defensive tackles, one sack, and one forced fumble, before being a healthy scratch for the next three games. He was then released on August 6, 2025.

=== BC Lions ===
On August 11, 2025, Haba signed with the BC Lions and joined their practice roster. He did not appear in any games for the Lions, and was released on October 1, 2025.

=== Columbus Aviators ===
On February 28, 2026, Haba signed with the Columbus Aviators of the United Football League (UFL). He was released on March 19 and re-signed on May 4.
