= Noah Dawkins =

American football player (born 1997)

No. 10 – Columbus Aviators
- Position: Inside linebacker
- Roster status: Active

Personal information
- Born: August 13, 1997 (age 29); Spartanburg, South Carolina, U.S.
- Listed height: 6 ft 1 in (1.85 m)
- Listed weight: 239 lb (108 kg)

Career information
- High school: James F. Byrnes (Duncan, South Carolina)
- College: The Citadel
- NFL draft: 2019: undrafted

Career history
- Cincinnati Bengals (2019)*; Tampa Bay Buccaneers (2019); New York Jets (2020–2021); Chicago Bears (2022)*; Michigan Panthers (2023–2025); Columbus Aviators (2026–present)
- * Offseason or practice squad member only

Awards and highlights
- First-team All-SoCon (2018)

Career NFL statistics
- Total tackles: 3
- Stats at Pro Football Reference

Noah Dawkins (born August 13, 1997) is an American football linebacker or the Columbus Aviators of the United Football League (UFL). He played college football for The Citadel.

== High school and college career ==
A native of Spartanburg, South Carolina, he was a two-year letterman at James F. Byrnes High School. As a senior he set a school record with 23 sacks. He was named the ESPN Upstate Player of the Year and the Spartanburg Herald Journal Defensive Player of the Year.

Dawkins was a member of The Citadel Bulldogs for four seasons. As a senior, Dawkins finished second on the team with 66 tackles and 13.5 tackles for loss and led the Bulldogs with 5.5 sacks and was named first-team All-Southern Conference. He finished his collegiate career with 166 tackles, 31.5 tackles for loss, 14.0 sacks, two forced fumbles and two interceptions.

== Professional career ==
Pre-draft measurables
Height	Weight	Arm length	Hand span	Wingspan	40-yard dash	10-yard split	20-yard split	Vertical jump	Broad jump
6 ft 0 3/4 in (1.85 m)	227 lb (103 kg)	32 3/8 in (0.82 m)	9 1/4 in (0.23 m)	6 ft 5 7/8 in (1.98 m)	4.41 s	1.56 s	2.58 s	31.0 in (0.79 m)	10 ft 5 in (3.18 m)
All values from Pro Day

=== Cincinnati Bengals ===
After an impressive Pro Day in the spring of his senior year at The Citadel Dawkins was named to Mel Kipers "Big Board" list of 300 top draft picks but was not selected, he was signed by the Cincinnati Bengals as a free agent on May 11, 2019. He was waived by the Bengals at the end of training camp, but was re-signed to the team's practice squad.

=== Tampa Bay Buccaneers ===
Dawkins was signed off the Bengals' practice squad by the Tampa Bay Buccaneers. Dawkins made his NFL debut on October 27, 2019 against the Tennessee Titans.

On September 5, 2020, Dawkins was waived by the Buccaneers.

=== New York Jets ===
On September 22, 2020, the New York Jets signed Dawkins to their practice squad. He was elevated to the active roster on December 5, December 12, December 19, December 26, and January 2, 2021, for the team's weeks 13, 14, 15, 16, and 17 games against the Las Vegas Raiders, Seattle Seahawks, Los Angeles Rams, Cleveland Browns, and New England Patriots, and reverted to the practice squad after each game. He signed a reserve/future contract with the Jets on January 4, 2021.

On August 31, 2021, Dawkins was waived by the Jets. He was re-signed to the practice squad on September 14. He was promoted to the active roster on October 30, 2021. He was waived on November 2, 2021 and re-signed to the practice squad.

=== Chicago Bears ===
On February 22, 2022, Dawkins signed with the Chicago Bears. He was released on August 16, 2022.

=== Michigan Panthers ===
On March 14, 2023, Dawkins signed with the Michigan Panthers of the United States Football League (USFL). He re-signed with the team on August 23, 2024.

=== Columbus Aviators ===
On January 13, 2026, Dawkins was selected by the Columbus Aviators in the 2026 UFL Draft.
