= Cam Smith (cornerback) =

American football player (born 2000)

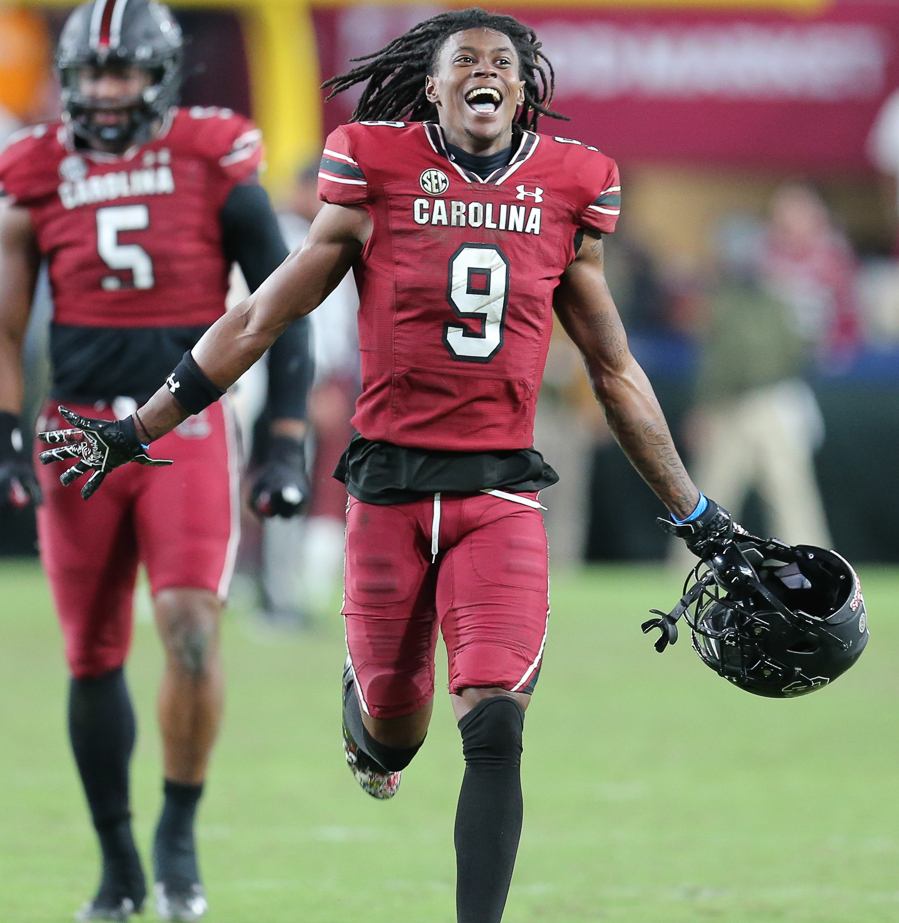
- Smith with the South Carolina Gamecocks in 2022

No. 9 – Columbus Aviators
- Position: Cornerback
- Roster status: Active

Personal information
- Born: December 21, 2000 (age 25); Blythewood, South Carolina, U.S.
- Listed height: 6 ft 1 in (1.85 m)
- Listed weight: 183 lb (83 kg)

Career information
- High school: Westwood (Blythewood)
- College: South Carolina (2019–2022)
- NFL draft: 2023: 2nd round, 51st overall pick

Career history
- Miami Dolphins (2023–2025); Columbus Aviators (2026–present)

Awards and highlights
- Second-team All-SEC (2021)

Career NFL statistics
- Total tackles: 18
- Stats at Pro Football Reference

Cameron Marquise Jani' Smith (born December 21, 2000) is an American professional football cornerback for the Columbus Aviators of the United Football League (UFL). He played college football for the South Carolina Gamecocks.

== Early life ==
Smith attended Meade Senior High School in Fort Meade, Maryland, before transferring before his senior year to Westwood High School in Blythewood, South Carolina. He was selected to play in the 2019 All-American Bowl. He committed to the University of South Carolina to play college football.

== College career ==
Smith played in three games as a true freshman at South Carolina in 2019 and had three tackles. As a redshirt freshman in 2020, he started three of eight games and had 16 tackles and two interceptions. In 2021, he played in 11 games with seven starts, recording 41 tackles and three interceptions.

== Professional career ==
Pre-draft measurables
Height	Weight	Arm length	Hand span	Wingspan	40-yard dash	10-yard split	20-yard split	Vertical jump	Broad jump
6 ft 0 3/4 in (1.85 m)	180 lb (82 kg)	31 5/8 in (0.80 m)	9 1/8 in (0.23 m)	6 ft 4 1/8 in (1.93 m)	4.43 s	1.49 s	2.52 s	38.0 in (0.97 m)	11 ft 2 in (3.40 m)
All values from NFL Combine

=== Miami Dolphins ===
The Miami Dolphins selected Smith with the 51st pick in the second round of the 2023 NFL draft. As a rookie, he appeared in 15 games in the 2023 season.

Smith was placed on injured reserve on August 27, 2024. He was activated on October 21.

On September 30, 2025, Smith was waived by the Dolphins, having not appeared for the team during the regular season.

=== Columbus Aviators ===
On January 14, 2026, Smith was selected by the Columbus Aviators of the United Football League (UFL).

== NFL career statistics ==
Legend
**Bold**	Career high

Year	Team	Games		Tackles							Interceptions						Fumbles				
Year	Team	GP	GS	Cmb	Solo	Ast	TFL	QBH	Sck	Sfty	PD	Int	Yds	Y/I	Lng	TD	FF	FR	Yds	Y/R	TD
2023	MIA	15	0	2	1	1	0	0	0.0	0	0	0	0	0	0	0	0	0	0	0	0
Career		15	0	2	1	1	0	0	0.0	0	0	0	0	0.0	0	0	0	0	0	0	0
