= Tony Fields II =

American football player (born 1999)

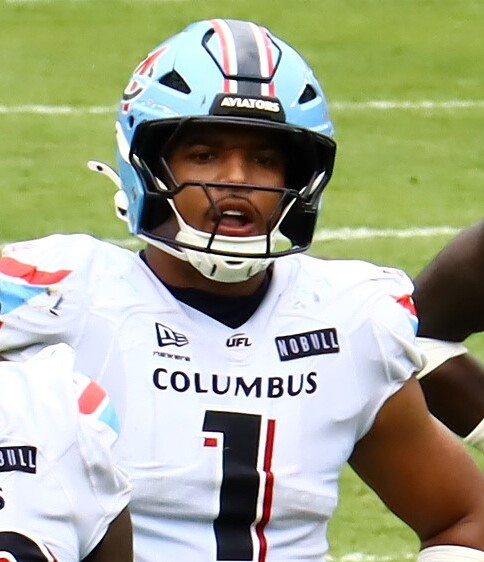
- Fields with the Columbus Aviators in 2026

No. 43 – Chicago Bears
- Position: Linebacker
- Roster status: Injured reserve

Personal information
- Born: June 18, 1999 (age 27); Las Vegas, Nevada, U.S.
- Listed height: 6 ft 0 in (1.83 m)
- Listed weight: 222 lb (101 kg)

Career information
- High school: Desert Pines (Las Vegas)
- College: Arizona (2017–2019); West Virginia (2020)
- NFL draft: 2021: 5th round, 153rd overall pick

Career history
- Cleveland Browns (2021–2024); Los Angeles Rams (2024–2025)*; Columbus Aviators (2026); Chicago Bears (2026–present)
- * Offseason or practice squad member only

Awards and highlights
- All-UFL Team (2026); Big 12 Defensive Newcomer of the Year (2020); 2020 All-Big 12 Conference football team; Reese’s Senior Bowl All-America First-team

Career NFL statistics as of 2024
- Total tackles: 88
- Forced fumbles: 1
- Fumble recoveries: 2
- Pass deflections: 1
- Interceptions: 1
- Defensive touchdowns: 2
- Stats at Pro Football Reference

Tony Fields II (born June 18, 1999) is an American professional football linebacker for the Chicago Bears of the National Football League (NFL). He played college football for the Arizona Wildcats and West Virginia Mountaineers. He has also been a member of the Cleveland Browns, Los Angeles Rams, and the Columbus Aviators.

== Early life ==
Fields is the son of singer LeMisha Grinstead. Fields attended Desert Pines High School in Las Vegas. He committed to University of Arizona to play football.

== College career ==
As a three-year starter at Arizona, Fields primarily played Outside Linebacker. Following his year, Fields decided to transfer to West Virginia University, wanting to prove his versatility to NFL Scouts. After a successful senior season, Fields declared for the 2021 NFL draft.

== Professional career ==
Pre-draft measurables
Height	Weight	Arm length	Hand span	Wingspan	40-yard dash	10-yard split	20-yard split	20-yard shuttle	Three-cone drill	Vertical jump	Broad jump	Bench press
6 ft 0 1/4 in (1.84 m)	222 lb (101 kg)	31 1/4 in (0.79 m)	9 in (0.23 m)	6 ft 4 1/2 in (1.94 m)	4.63 s	1.55 s	2.71 s	4.48 s	7.15 s	34.0 in (0.86 m)	9 ft 6 in (2.90 m)	17 reps
All values from Pro Day

=== Cleveland Browns ===
On May 1, 2021, Fields was selected by the Cleveland Browns with the 153rd overall pick in the 2021 NFL draft. He signed his four-year rookie contract on May 13, 2021.

Field suffered an ankle injury in Week 1 of the 2024 season and was placed on injured reserve on September 11, 2024. He was released on October 22.

=== Los Angeles Rams ===
On October 28, 2024, Fields was signed to the Los Angeles Rams practice squad. He signed a reserve/future contract with Los Angeles on January 20, 2025. On August 24, Fields was released by the Rams.

=== Columbus Aviators ===
On February 24, 2026, Fields signed with the Columbus Aviators of the United Football League (UFL). On June 4, Fields was named to the 2026 All-UFL team.

=== Chicago Bears ===
On June 15, 2026, Fields signed with the Chicago Bears. He was placed on injured reserve on August 30.
