= Tay Martin =

American football player (born 1997)

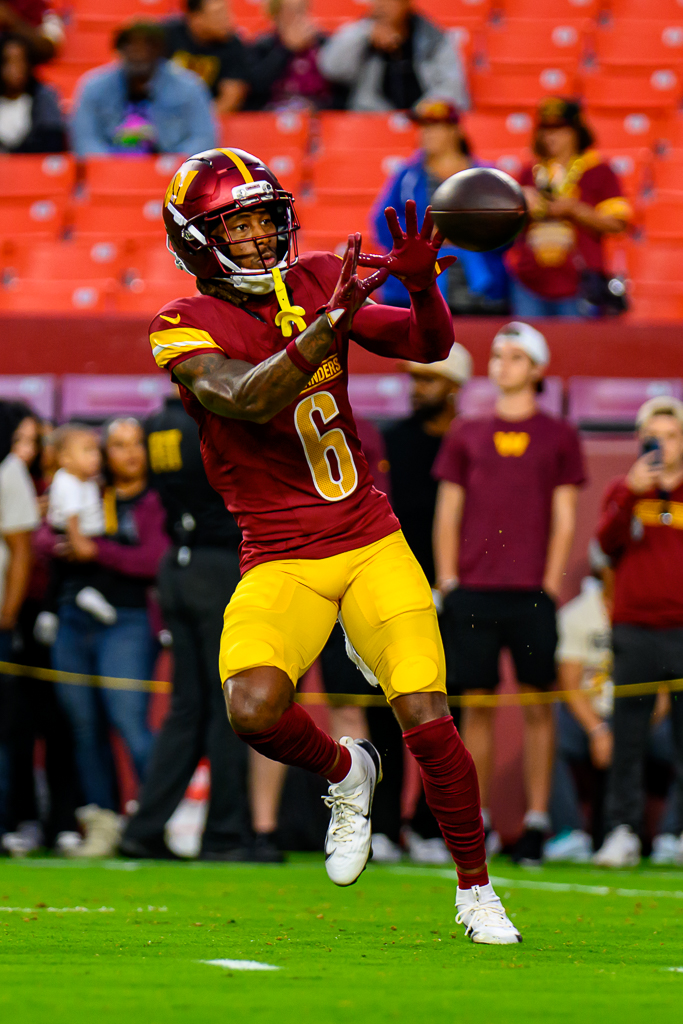
- Martin with the Washington Commanders in 2025

No. 17 – Detroit Lions
- Position: Wide receiver
- Roster status: Active

Personal information
- Born: December 14, 1997 (age 28); Houma, Louisiana, U.S.
- Listed height: 6 ft 3 in (1.91 m)
- Listed weight: 185 lb (84 kg)

Career information
- High school: Ellender Memorial (Houma)
- College: Washington State (2017–2019); Oklahoma State (2020–2021)
- NFL draft: 2022: undrafted

Career history
- San Francisco 49ers (2022–2024); Tennessee Titans (2024); Washington Commanders (2025); Columbus Aviators (2026); Detroit Lions (2026–present)

Awards and highlights
- Second-team All-Big 12 (2021)

Career NFL statistics as of 2025
- Receptions: 3
- Receiving yards: 72
- Receiving touchdowns: 1
- Stats at Pro Football Reference

Davontavean Martin (born December 14, 1997) is an American professional football wide receiver for the Detroit Lions of the National Football League (NFL). He played college football for the Washington State Cougars and Oklahoma State Cowboys. Martin has also been a member of the San Francisco 49ers, Tennessee Titans, Washington Commanders, and the UFL's Columbus Aviators. He was signed as an undrafted free agent by the 49ers following the 2022 NFL draft.

== Professional career ==
Pre-draft measurables
| Height | Weight | Arm length | Hand span | Wingspan | 40-yard dash | 10-yard split | 20-yard split | 20-yard shuttle | Three-cone drill | Vertical jump | Broad jump |
|---|---|---|---|---|---|---|---|---|---|---|---|
| 6 ft 1 1/2 in (1.87 m) | 184 lb (83 kg) | 32 3/8 in (0.82 m) | 9 3/8 in (0.24 m) | 6 ft 5 3/8 in (1.97 m) | 4.58 s | 1.54 s | 2.64 s | 4.21 s | 7.00 s | 36.0 in (0.91 m) | 9 ft 9 in (2.97 m) |
All values from Pro Day

=== San Francisco 49ers ===
On April 30, 2022, Martin signed with the San Francisco 49ers as an undrafted free agent. He was released during final roster cutdowns on August 30. Martin was signed to the team's practice squad the following day. He signed a reserve/future contract with the 49ers on January 31, 2023.

On August 29, 2023, Martin was waived by the 49ers and re-signed to the practice squad. He signed a reserve/future contract with San Francisco on February 13, 2024.

Martin was waived by the 49ers on August 27, 2024, and re-signed to the practice squad. On September 3, Martin was released from the practice squad.

=== Tennessee Titans ===
On September 10, 2024, Martin was signed to the Tennessee Titans' practice squad. He was promoted to the active roster on January 4, 2025. In a 23-14 Week 18 loss to the Houston Texans, Martin made his first career reception on a 49-yard touchdown pass from quarterback Will Levis.

On May 7, 2025, Martin was waived/injured by the Titans and reverted to the injured reserve the following day. He was waived again on May 14.

=== Washington Commanders ===
Martin signed with the Washington Commanders on July 23, 2025, and was released on August 26. Martin re-signed with their practice squad on September 16. He was elevated to the active roster for Weeks 4, 5, and 6, but was released from the practice squad on October 17.

=== Columbus Aviators ===
On January 14, 2026, Martin was selected by the Columbus Aviators of the United Football League (UFL).

=== Detroit Lions ===
On June 16, 2026, Martin signed with the Detroit Lions. For his contributions to special teams in the Week 1 win against the Saints, he received a game ball.

== Personal life ==
Tay Martin is engaged to Morgan Pitre. They have two daughters, Reign and Valley.
