= Caeveon Patton =

American football player (born 2000)

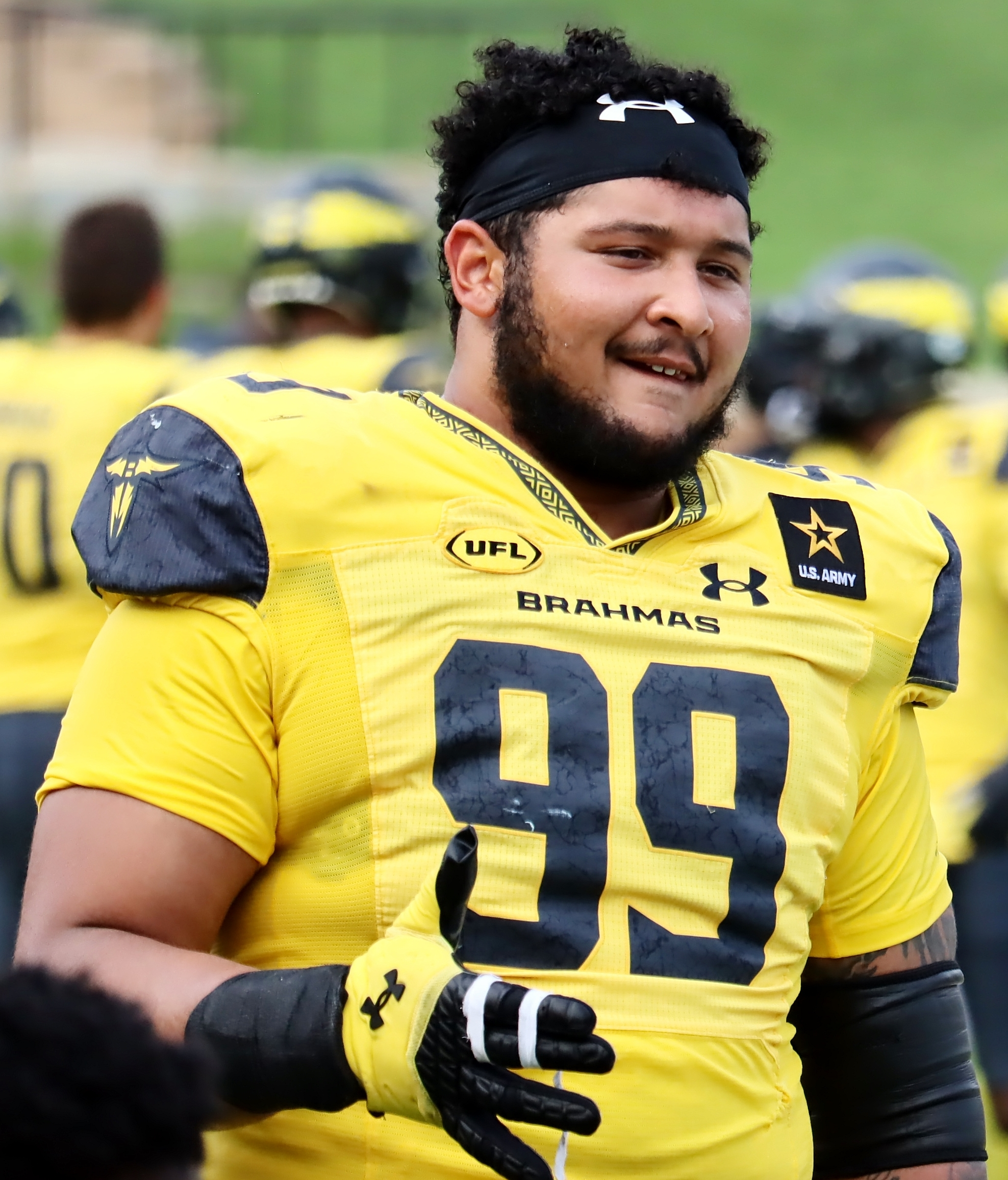
- Patton with the San Antonio Brahmas in 2024

No. 96 – Columbus Aviators
- Position: Defensive end
- Roster status: Active

Personal information
- Born: March 2, 1999 (age 27); Cuero, Texas, U.S.
- Listed height: 6 ft 2 in (1.88 m)
- Listed weight: 290 lb (132 kg)

Career information
- High school: Cuero
- College: Texas State (2017–2021)
- NFL draft: 2022: undrafted

Career history
- Indianapolis Colts (2022)*; Orlando Guardians (2023); Atlanta Falcons (2023)*; San Antonio Brahmas (2024–2025); Columbus Aviators (2026–present)
- * Offseason or practice squad member only

Awards and highlights
- All-XFL Team (2023)
- Stats at Pro Football Reference

Caeveon Patton (born March 2, 1999) is an American football defensive end for the Columbus Aviators of the United Football League (UFL). He played college football at Texas State. He also played for the Orlando Guardians of the XFL.

== Professional career ==
Pre-draft measurables
Height	Weight	Arm length	Hand span	Wingspan	40-yard dash	10-yard split	20-yard split	20-yard shuttle	Three-cone drill	Vertical jump	Broad jump	Bench press
6 ft 1 1/4 in (1.86 m)	291 lb (132 kg)	32 3/8 in (0.82 m)	10 in (0.25 m)	6 ft 5 1/2 in (1.97 m)	5.04 s	1.65 s	2.90 s	4.57 s	7.47 s	34.0 in (0.86 m)	8 ft 10 in (2.69 m)	22 reps
All values from Pro Day

=== Indianapolis Colts ===
On June 9, 2022, the Indianapolis Colts signed Patton to a three-year, $2.56 million contract as an undrafted free agent. On July 26, he was waived by the Colts. On July 29, the Colts signed Patton to a one-year, $705,000 contract. On August 22, Patton was again waived by the Colts.

=== Orlando Guardians ===
Patton played for the Orlando Guardians of the XFL in 2023, earning All-XFL honors after leading the league in tackles by a defensive lineman.

=== Atlanta Falcons ===
On August 3, 2023, the Atlanta Falcons signed Patton to a one-year, $750,000 contract. He was waived on August 29, 2023.

=== San Antonio Brahmas ===
On January 22, 2024, Patton signed with the San Antonio Brahmas of the United Football League (UFL). He re-signed with the team on August 23, 2024. He was released on May 20, 2025.

=== Columbus Aviators ===
On January 13, 2026, Patton was selected by the Columbus Aviators in the 2026 UFL Draft.
