= Ryan Nelson (American football) =

American football player (born 1999)

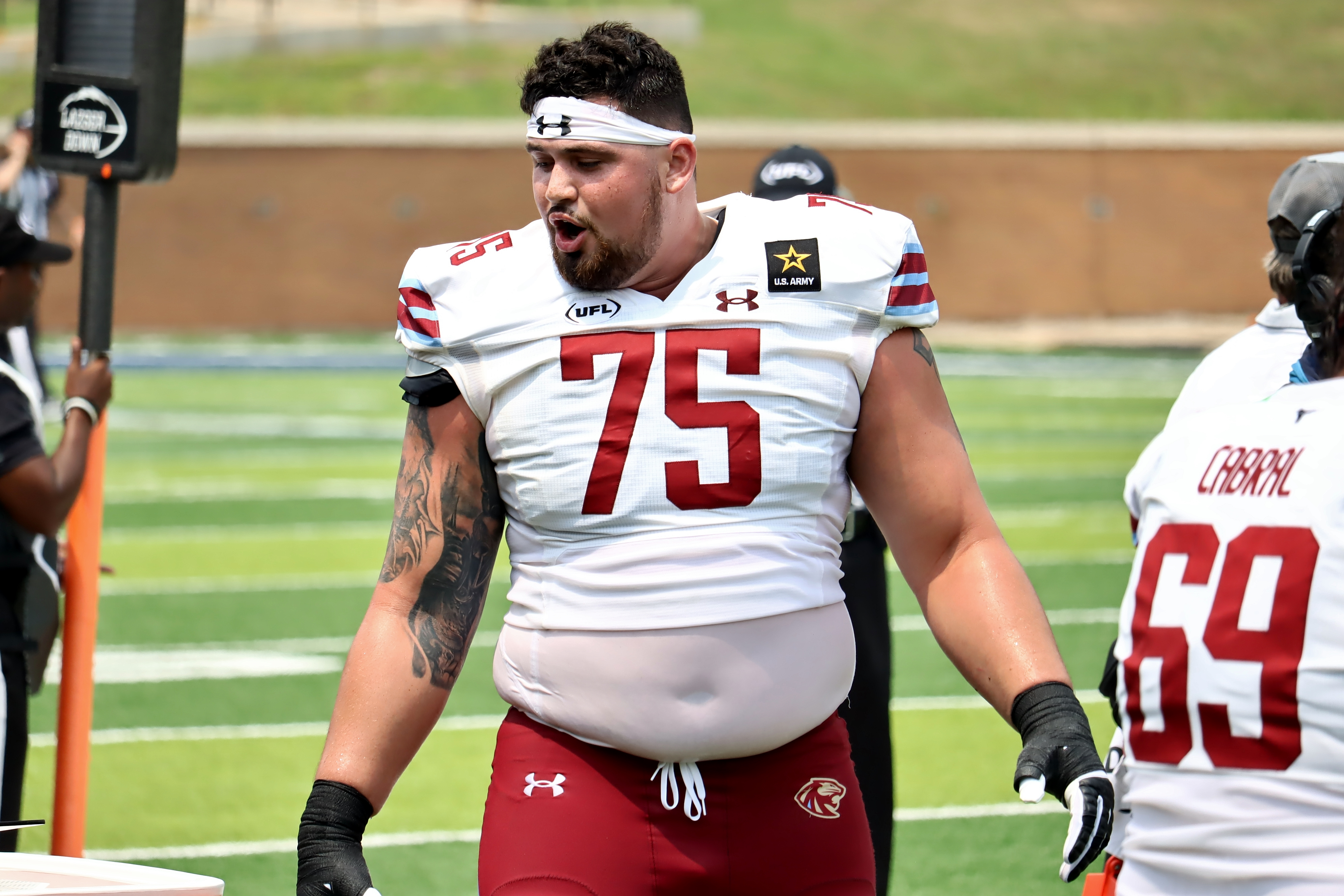
- Nelson in 2024

No. 75 – Columbus Aviators
- Position: Offensive tackle
- Roster status: Active

Personal information
- Born: August 6, 1999 (age 27)
- Listed height: 6 ft 6 in (1.98 m)
- Listed weight: 340 lb (154 kg)

Career information
- High school: Buena Park (Buena Park, California)
- College: Virginia (2017–2022)
- NFL draft: 2023: undrafted

Career history
- Michigan Panthers (2023–2025); Los Angeles Chargers (2025)*; Columbus Aviators (2026–present)
- * Offseason or practice squad member only

Awards and highlights
- All-UFL Team (2025)

Ryan Nelson (born August 6, 1999) is an American professional football offensive tackle for the Columbus Aviators of the United Football League (UFL). He played college football for the Virginia Cavaliers.

== College career ==
Nelson played college football for the Virginia Cavaliers from 2017 to 2022, where he started in 49 consecutive games at both offensive tackle, and guard.

== Professional career ==
=== Michigan Panthers ===
On December 13, 2022, Nelson signed with the Michigan Panthers of the United States Football League (USFL). He was re-signed on August 12, 2024. On June 2, 2025, Nelson was named to the All-UFL Team.

=== Los Angeles Chargers ===
On July 17, 2025, Nelson signed with the Los Angeles Chargers of the National Football League (NFL). He was released on August 16.

=== Columbus Aviators ===
On January 13, 2026, Nelson was drafted by the Columbus Aviators of the United Football League (UFL) in the 2026 UFL draft.
