= Jailin Walker =

American football player (born 2003)

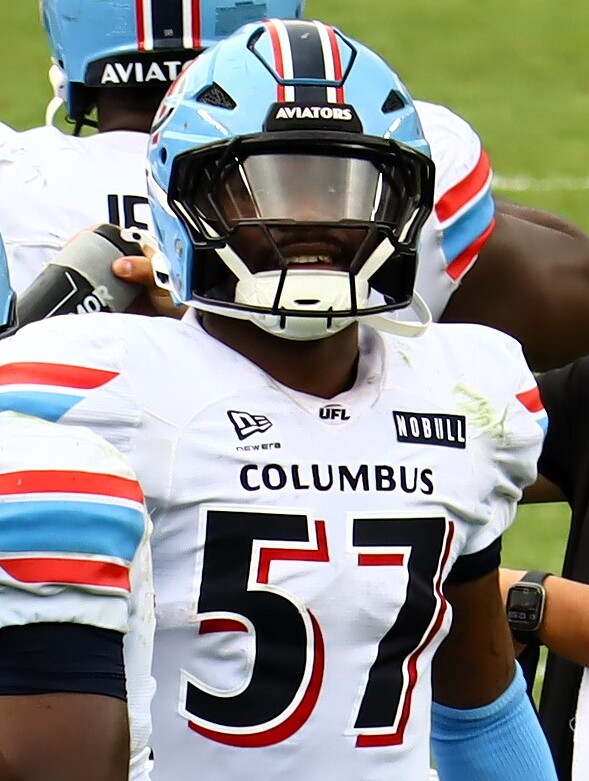
- Walker with the Columbus Aviators in 2026

No. 57 – Columbus Aviators
- Position: Linebacker
- Roster status: Active

Personal information
- Born: February 10, 2003 (age 23); Richmond, Virginia, U.S.
- Listed height: 6 ft 0 in (1.83 m)
- Listed weight: 219 lb (99 kg)

Career information
- High school: Varina (Henrico County, Virginia)
- College: James Madison (2021–2023); Indiana (2024)
- NFL draft: 2025: undrafted

Career history
- Las Vegas Raiders (2025)*; Columbus Aviators (2026–present)
- * Offseason or practice squad member only
- Stats at Pro Football Reference

Jailin Walker (born February 10, 2003) is an American professional football linebacker for the Columbus Aviators of the United Football League (UFL). He played college football for the James Madison Dukes and Indiana Hoosiers.

== Early life ==
Walker attended Varina High School in Henrico County, Virginia, where he played running back and linebacker. An unranked recruit, he committed to play college football for the James Madison Dukes.

== College career ==
=== James Madison ===
During a three-year career at James Madison from 2021 through 2023, Walker appeared in 32 games with 20 starts, where he notched 142 tackles with eight and a half being for a loss, three and a half sacks, six pass deflections, three interceptions, four forced fumbles, and two touchdowns, while also being named an honorable mention all-Sun Belt Conference selection twice in 2022 and 2023. After the conclusion of the 2023 season, Walker entered his name into the NCAA transfer portal.

=== Indiana ===
Walker transferred to play for the Indiana Hoosiers. He entered the 2024 season as a starting linebacker for the Hoosiers. In week three of the 2024 season, Walker notched seven tackles, with one being for a loss, in a win over UCLA.

== Professional career ==
Pre-draft measurables
Height	Weight	Arm length	Hand span	Wingspan	40-yard dash	10-yard split	20-yard split	20-yard shuttle	Three-cone drill	Vertical jump	Broad jump
6 ft 0 3/8 in (1.84 m)	219 lb (99 kg)	31 1/2 in (0.80 m)	9 1/8 in (0.23 m)	6 ft 5 1/8 in (1.96 m)	4.41 s	1.53 s	2.52 s	4.44 s	7.31 s	35.0 in (0.89 m)	10 ft 7 in (3.23 m)
All values from Pro Day

=== Las Vegas Raiders ===
On May 9, 2025, Walker signed with the Las Vegas Raiders as an undrafted free agent after going unselected in the 2025 NFL draft. He was waived on July 22.

=== Columbus Aviators ===
On January 12, 2026, Walker was allocated to the Columbus Aviators of the United Football League (UFL).
