= Brad Robbins (American football) =

American football player (born 1998)

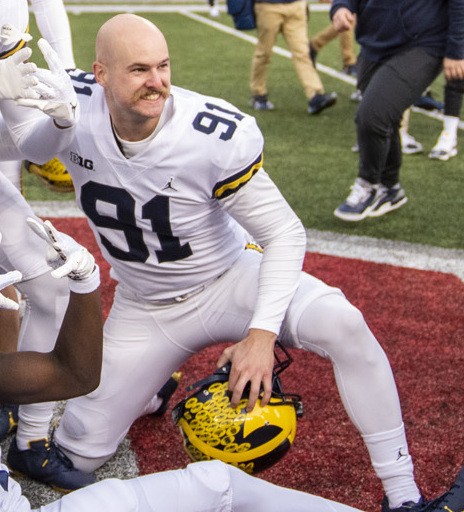
- Robbins with the Michigan Wolverines in 2022

No. 83 – Columbus Aviators
- Position: Punter
- Roster status: Active

Personal information
- Born: October 6, 1998 (age 28); Westerville, Ohio, U.S.
- Listed height: 6 ft 1 in (1.85 m)
- Listed weight: 203 lb (92 kg)

Career information
- High school: Westerville South (OH)
- College: Michigan (2017–2022)
- NFL draft: 2023: 6th round, 217th overall pick

Career history
- Cincinnati Bengals (2023–2024); Buffalo Bills (2025); Las Vegas Raiders (2025)*; Columbus Aviators (2026–present)
- * Offseason or practice squad member only

Career NFL statistics as of 2025
- Punts: 80
- Punt yards: 3,527
- Punt average: 44.1
- Net punting average: 40.1
- Inside 20: 21
- Longest punt: 62
- Stats at Pro Football Reference

Brad Robbins (born October 6, 1998) is an American professional football punter for the Columbus Aviators of the United Football League (UFL). He played college football for the Michigan Wolverines, and was selected by the Bengals in the sixth round of the 2023 NFL draft.

== College career ==
Robbins committed to Michigan in February 2017.

== Professional career ==
Pre-draft measurables
Height	Weight	Arm length	Hand span	Wingspan	Vertical jump
6 ft 0 1/2 in (1.84 m)	199 lb (90 kg)	30 3/8 in (0.77 m)	9 in (0.23 m)	6 ft 2 5/8 in (1.90 m)	35.5 in (0.90 m)
All values from NFL Combine/Pro Day

=== Cincinnati Bengals ===
Robbins was selected by the Cincinnati Bengals in the sixth round (217th overall) of the 2023 NFL draft, making him and Michigan teammate Jake Moody the second punter and kicker tandem to be taken in the same draft in the last 40 years. He was the second punter taken in the draft behind Bryce Baringer, and ahead of Ethan Evans.

Robbins began the 2024 season on injured reserve with a quadriceps injury. He was released on October 1, 2024.

=== Buffalo Bills ===
On March 31, 2025, Robbins signed with the Buffalo Bills. On September 9, he was released following their first game of the season.

=== Las Vegas Raiders ===
On October 7, 2025, Robbins signed with the Las Vegas Raiders' practice squad. He was released on October 14.

=== Columbus Aviators ===
On March 18, 2026, Robbins signed with the Columbus Aviators of the United Football League (UFL).
