= Aaron Monteiro =

American football player (born 1997)

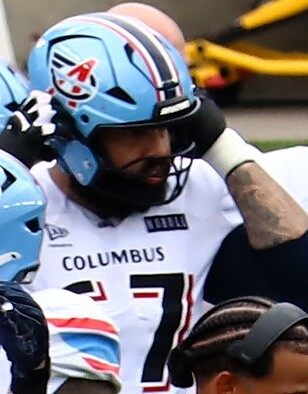
- Monteiro with the Columbus Aviators in 2026

No. 67 – Columbus Aviators
- Position: Offensive tackle
- Roster status: Active

Personal information
- Born: March 25, 1997 (age 29); Brockton, Massachusetts, U.S.
- Listed height: 6 ft 6 in (1.98 m)
- Listed weight: 339 lb (154 kg)

Career information
- High school: Brockton (Brockton, Massachusetts)
- College: Boston College (2015–2018)
- NFL draft: 2019: undrafted

Career history
- Miami Dolphins (2019)*; New England Patriots (2019)*; Carolina Panthers (2019–2021); Washington Commanders (2022*; San Antonio Brahmas (2024–2025); Columbus Aviators (2026–present)
- * Offseason or practice squad member only

Awards and highlights
- Third-team All-ACC (2018)

Career UFL statistics
- Games played: 2
- Stats at Pro Football Reference

Aaron Joseph Monteiro (born March 25, 1997) is an American professional football offensive tackle for the Columbus Aviators of the United Football League (UFL). He played college football at Boston College and has been a member of the Miami Dolphins, New England Patriots, Carolina Panthers, and Washington Commanders of the National Football League (NFL).

== College career ==
Monteiro was ranked as a three–star recruit by 247Sports.com coming out of high school. He committed to Boston College on March 29, 2014. He made the All-Atlantic Coast Conference third-team in 2018.

== Professional career ==
Pre-draft measurables
Height	Weight	Arm length	Hand span	Wingspan	40-yard dash	10-yard split	20-yard split	20-yard shuttle	Three-cone drill	Vertical jump	Broad jump	Bench press
6 ft 6 in (1.98 m)	311 lb (141 kg)	33 7/8 in (0.86 m)	10 1/4 in (0.26 m)	6 ft 9 1/2 in (2.07 m)	5.31 s	1.83 s	3.02 s	4.77 s	7.82 s	29.5 in (0.75 m)	8 ft 10 in (2.69 m)	19 reps
All values from Pro Day

=== Miami Dolphins ===
After going undrafted in the 2019 NFL draft, Monteiro signed with the Miami Dolphins on May 10, 2019. He was released on August 21.

=== New England Patriots ===
On October 22, 2019, the New England Patriots signed Monteiro to their practice squad. He was released on October 29.

=== Carolina Panthers ===
On November 12, 2019, the Carolina Panthers signed Monteiro to their practice squad. He was signed to a future deal on December 30, 2019. He was released on September 5, 2020, but was re-signed to the practice squad on September 21. He was promoted to the active roster on December 19, 2020, and once again on January 2, 2021. He was signed to a future deal on January 4, 2021.

On August 30, 2021, Monteiro was released by the Panthers but was re-signed to the practice squad. He was released on November 3, 2021. He was re-signed to the practice squad on November 9. He was released on May 12, 2022.

=== Washington Commanders ===
On May 23, 2022, Monteiro was signed by the Washington Commanders. He was released on August 30, 2022, but was re-signed to the practice squad the next day. He was released on August 28, 2023.

=== San Antonio Brahmas ===
On December 13, 2023, Monteiro signed with the San Antonio Brahmas of the United Football League (UFL).

=== Columbus Aviators ===
On January 13, 2026, Monteiro was selected by the Columbus Aviators in the 2026 UFL draft.
