= 2026 UFL draft =

American football events to select players

2026 UFL dispersal draft

General information
- Date: January 9–14, 2026
- Location: UFL HQ (Arlington, TX); Remote

Overview
- League: United Football League

The 2026 UFL draft was the player selection process to fill the rosters of the eight teams for the 2026 UFL season.

== History ==
The 2024 UFL draft had largely been unsuccessful, as it was restricted to rookie players who had gone undrafted in that year's NFL Draft and most of the drafted players refused to sign with the UFL. To address this, the league indicated plans to hold the 2025 draft in September 2025, after NFL rosters and practice squads were set, to better assess who was actually available and would be realistically willing to sign. By summer 2025, with continued uncertainty about which teams would still be in the UFL and where they would be playing, this draft was indefinitely suspended.

Following Mike Repole's acquisition of the UFL and the relocation of the Michigan Panthers, Memphis Showboats, and San Antonio Brahmas, UFL representatives had initially promised that he would honor the contracts teams had signed with its existing players and not liquidate their rosters. Repole disregarded that promise and announced that every team's rosters would be dissolved and a draft would occur to create new teams. One of the goals of this process was to move the teams to a have more regional centered rosters.

== Structure ==
On January 9, 2026 quarterbacks were selected remotely. The next day, regional college allocation would occur. In this process, coaches are allowed to select a maximum of three players from a list of Division I FBS universities in close proximity to their home cities. Both of these category selections were announced on January 12.

On January 13-14th the main draft was held at the UFL HQ in Arlington, Texas. On the 13th, UFL players from the 2025 season were drafted in six positional groups: offensive lineman, running backs and tight ends, wide receivers, defensive front seven (defensive tackles, ends, and linebackers), defensive backs, and specialists. Teams could protect 12 players from their 2025 rosters on a reserve list that will not be available to draft, with the three teams in new markets each being given access to the rosters of one of the three 2025 teams that were not retained for 2026 for potential protection.

On January 14, the free agents draft was held; this was likewise broken into positional groups with an additional open draft section at the end.

Draft order was determined by a virtual lottery and the draft was conducted in a snake format, with the draft order reversing itself in each round.

Teams were allowed to select a minimum of 60 and a maximum of 62 players in the draft including three quarterbacks, a maximum of three college allocations, and a maximum of 12 protected players.

== Eligibility ==
To be eligible for the UFL Players draft, a player must have ended the 2025 UFL season on an active roster or injured reserve.

To be eligible for the free agent draft a player must not have been signed to a UFL active roster in 2025 and fall into one of the following categories:

1. 2025 NFL draft-eligible players
2. 2025 NFL training camp players
3. 2026 NFL draft-eligible players
4. UFL Showcase attendees
5. Players who signed a LOI and did not finish the 2025 season on a UFL roster
6. Other free agents

== Protected players ==
Teams are allowed to protect up to 12 players from their 2025 rosters. The three new teams will draw from the rosters of the now defunct teams. The Columbus Aviators will draw from the Michigan Panthers roster, the Louisville Kings from the Memphis Showboats, and the Orlando Storm from the San Antonio Brahmas.

=== Birmingham Stallions ===
| Player | Position | College |
|---|---|---|
| Deonte Brown | G | Alabama |
| Deon Cain | WR | Clemson |
| Tae Crowder | LB | Georgia |
| Tyrion Davis-Price | RB | LSU |
| Steven Gilmore | CB | Marshall |
| Mario Goodrich | CB | Clemson |
| Tre Norwood | S | Oklahoma |
| Ronnie Perkins | LB | Oklahoma |
| Armani Taylor-Prioleau | T | South Carolina State |
| Jordan Thomas | TE | Mississippi State |
| Marlon Williams | WR | UCF |
| Marvin Wilson | DT | Florida State |

=== Columbus Aviators ===
| Player | Position | College |
|---|---|---|
| Cohl Cabral | C | Arizona State |
| Noah Dawkins | LB | The Citadel |
| Akeem Dent | S | Florida State |
| D.J. Miller | CB | Kent State |
| Jaylon Moore | WR | UT Martin |
| Ryan Nelson | T | Virginia |
| Gunnar Oakes | TE | Eastern Michigan |
| Walter Palmore | DT | Missouri |
| Devin Ross | WR | Colorado |
| Toa Taua | RB | Nevada |
| Kedrick Whitehead Jr. | S | Delaware |
| Kenny Willekes | DE | Michigan State |

=== Dallas Renegades ===
| Player | Position | College |
|---|---|---|
| Alex Akingbulu | T | Fresno State |
| Deontay Burnett | WR | USC |
| Taco Charlton | DE | Michigan |
| Myles Dorn | S | North Carolina |
| Seth Green | TE | Houston |
| Ajene Harris | CB | USC |
| Dae Dae Hunter | RB | Liberty |
| Steven Jones Jr. | CB | Appalachian State |
| Marcus Minor | G | Pittsburgh |
| Donald Payne | LB | Stetson |
| Willie Taylor III | DE | Eastern Kentucky |
| Tyler Vaughns | WR | USC |

=== DC Defenders ===
| Player | Position | College |
|---|---|---|
| Deandre Baker | CB | Georgia |
| Michah Baskerville | LB | LSU |
| Trey Dean | S | Florida |
| Tykem Doss | G | Southern Miss |
| Mason Fairchild | TE | Kansas |
| Deon Jackson | RB | Duke |
| Michael Maietti | C | Missouri |
| Andre Mintze | LB | Vanderbilt |
| Cornell Powell | WR | Clemson |
| Derick Roberson | LB | Sam Houston State |
| Ty Scott | WR | Missouri State |
| Bryce Thompson | CB | Tennessee |

=== Houston Gamblers ===
| Player | Position | College |
|---|---|---|
| Christopher Allen | LB | Alabama |
| Israel Antwine | DT | Oklahoma State |
| Damon Arnette | CB | Ohio State |
| Justin Hall | WR | Ball State |
| Keenan Isaac | CB | Alabama State |
| Avery Jones | C | Auburn |
| Lawrence Keys III | WR | Tulane |
| Jack Kramer | C | Bowling Green |
| Kirk Merritt | RB | Arkansas State |
| Marvin Moody Jr. | LB | Tulane |
| Markel Roby | S | Pittsburgh State |
| Geor’Quarius Spivey | TE | Mississippi State |

=== Louisville Kings ===
| Player | Position | College |
|---|---|---|
| Jonathan Adams | WR | Arkansas State |
| Jaylon Allen | DE | Memphis |
| Josiah Bronson | DT | Washington |
| Steele Chambers | LB | Ohio State |
| Cameron Dantzler | CB | Mississippi State |
| Keaton Ellis | S | Penn State |
| Eric Garror | CB | Louisiana |
| Nate Gilliam | T | Wake Forest |
| Jalen Jackson | RB | Villanova |
| Kwamie Lassiter II | WR | Kansas |
| Alec Lindstrom | C | Boston College |
| Chris Pierce Jr. | TE | Vanderbilt |

=== Orlando Storm ===
| Player | Position | College |
|---|---|---|
| Tavante Beckett | LB | Marshall |
| Isaiah Buggs | DT | Alabama |
| Jashaun Corbin | RB | Florida State |
| Zuri Henry | T | UTEP |
| Steven Stilianos | TE | Iowa |
| Jacob Sykes | DE | UCLA |

=== St. Louis Battlehawks ===
| Player | Position | College |
|---|---|---|
| Bradley Ashmore | T | Vanderbilt |
| Ryan Coll | T | Richmond |
| Frank Darby | WR | Arizona State |
| Travis Feeney | LB | Washington |
| Jarveon Howard | RB | Alcorn State |
| Myles Jones | CB | Duke |
| Kam Kelly | DB | San Diego State |
| Jahcour Pearson | WR | Ole Miss |
| Myles Sims | CB | Georgia Tech |
| Pita Taumoepenu | LB | Utah |

== Quarterback Draft ==
The Quarterback Draft marked the first phase of the UFL's player selection process. Head coaches, working in collaboration with the league's centralized scouting department, evaluated all eligible quarterbacks and submitted a ranked list of their top five candidates to the league. The draft took place on Friday, January 9, and all selections were announced three days later. Not every team was assigned three quarterbacks.

| Team | Player | College |
|---|---|---|
| Birmingham Stallions | Matt Corral* | Ole Miss |
| Birmingham Stallions | Taylor Elgersma | Wilfrid Laurier |
| Birmingham Stallions | Jaren Hall | BYU |
| Columbus Aviators | Jalan McClendon | Baylor |
| Columbus Aviators | Jalen Morton | Prairie View A&M |
| Columbus Aviators | Clayton Tune | Houston |
| Dallas Renegades | Luis Perez* | East Texas A&M |
| Dallas Renegades | Austin Reed | Western Kentucky |
| DC Defenders | Mike DiLiello* | Austin Peay |
| DC Defenders | Spencer Sanders* | Ole Miss |
| DC Defenders | Jordan Ta'amu* | Ole Miss |
| Houston Gamblers | Hunter Dekkers | Iowa Western |
| Houston Gamblers | Donovan Smith | Houston |
| Louisville Kings | Jason Bean | Kansas |
| Louisville Kings | Chandler Rogers | California |
| Orlando Storm | Jack Plummer | Louisville |
| Orlando Storm | Dorian Thompson-Robinson | UCLA |
| St. Louis Battlehawks | Michael Pratt | Tulane |
| St. Louis Battlehawks | Brandon Silvers* | Troy |
| St. Louis Battlehawks | Ben Wooldridge | Louisiana |

(*) indicates a player returning to the same team as held his rights in 2025.

Elgersma, a Canadian national, was later deemed ineligible to play in the UFL due to the failure of the United States government to issue a P visa.

== Regional College Allocation ==
Each head coach selected up to three players from local colleges to protect. This process was completed on January 10 and published two days later.

Player allocations for each UFL team were determined based on the league's regionalization map, as outlined below:

- Birmingham: Alabama, Auburn, Ole Miss, Mississippi State, UAB
- Columbus: Indiana, Michigan, Notre Dame, Ohio State
- Dallas: Baylor, SMU, TCU, Texas, North Texas
- DC: Maryland, Penn State, Virginia, Virginia Tech
- Houston: Houston, LSU, Rice, Texas A&M
- Louisville: Cincinnati, Kentucky, Louisville, Tennessee
- Orlando: Florida, Florida State, USF, UCF
- St. Louis: Illinois, Iowa, Iowa State, Missouri

| Team | Player | Position | College | Previous UFL team |
|---|---|---|---|---|
| Birmingham Stallions | Kobe Jones | OLB | Mississippi State | San Antonio Brahmas |
| Birmingham Stallions | Mason Brooks | T | Ole Miss | DC Defenders |
| Birmingham Stallions | Desmond Little | DE | UAB | Free Agent |
| Columbus Aviators | Alizé Mack | TE | Notre Dame | San Antonio Brahmas |
| Columbus Aviators | Juwann Bushell-Beatty | T | Michigan | St. Louis Battlehawks |
| Columbus Aviators | Jailin Walker | MLB | Indiana | Free Agent |
| Dallas Renegades | Sam Tecklenburg | OL | Baylor | San Antonio Brahmas |
| Dallas Renegades | Keondre Coburn | DT | Texas | Free Agent |
| Dallas Renegades | Siaki Ika | NT | Baylor | Free Agent |
| DC Defenders | Gottlieb Ayedze | T | Maryland | Free Agent |
| DC Defenders | Brandon Smith | LB | Penn State | Free Agent |
| DC Defenders | Johari Branch | G | Maryland | DC Defenders |
| Houston Gamblers | Jontre Kirklin | WR | LSU | San Antonio Brahmas |
| Houston Gamblers | Anthony Hines III | LB | Texas A&M | DC Defenders |
| Houston Gamblers | Rashard Lawrence | DE | LSU | San Antonio Brahmas |
| Louisville Kings | JaVonta Payton | WR | Tennessee | Dallas Renegades |
| Louisville Kings | Daniel Grzesiak | DE | Cincinnati | Free Agent |
| Louisville Kings | Willie Tyler | OL | Louisville | San Antonio Brahmas |
| Orlando Storm | Cole Schneider | G | UCF | Birmingham Stallions |
| Orlando Storm | Samuel Jackson | G | UCF | Houston Roughnecks |
| Orlando Storm | Elijhah Badger | WR | Florida | Free Agent |
| St. Louis Battlehawks | Hakeem Butler | WR | Iowa State | St. Louis Battlehawks |
| St. Louis Battlehawks | Kevon Latulas | RB | Missouri State* | St. Louis Battlehawks |
| St. Louis Battlehawks | Michael Ojemudia | FS | Iowa | DC Defenders |

{*} School wasn't on the original regionalization college assignment by the league.

== UFL Players Draft ==
Three veteran players-St. Louis's Jaryd Jones-Smith, Birmingham's Amari Rodgers and Michigan's Kai Nacua—rejected their selections and retired from the UFL the day of the draft.

=== Phase 1: Offensive Linemen ===
| Team | Player | Position | College |
|---|---|---|---|
| Birmingham Stallions | Steven Gonzalez | G | Penn State |
| Birmingham Stallions | Noah Johnson | C | Kansas State |
| Birmingham Stallions | Noah Henderson | T | East Carolina |
| Birmingham Stallions | Avery Gennesy | G | Texas A&M |
| Columbus Aviators | Noah Atagi | G | Weber State |
| Columbus Aviators | Chuck Filiaga | G | Minnesota |
| Columbus Aviators | Matt Farniok | C | Nebraska |
| Columbus Aviators | Aaron Monteiro | G | Boston College |
| Dallas Renegades | Keaton Sutherland | G | Texas A&M |
| Dallas Renegades | Chim Okorafor | T | Benedictine |
| Dallas Renegades | Abdul Beecham | G | Kansas State |
| DC Defenders | Adrian Ealy | T | Oklahoma |
| Houston Gamblers | Christian DiLauro | T | Illinois |
| Houston Gamblers | Kellen Diesch | T | Arizona State |
| Houston Gamblers | Jaryd Jones-Smith | T | Pittsburgh |
| Houston Gamblers | Dohnovan West | C | Arizona State |
| Houston Gamblers | Cam Carter | T | Murray State |
| Louisville Kings | J. D. DiRenzo | G | Rutgers |
| Louisville Kings | Nash Jensen | G | North Dakota State |
| Louisville Kings | James Tunstall | T | Cincinnati |
| Louisville Kings | Gunner Britton | T | Auburn |
| Orlando Storm | Jarrid Williams | T | Miami (FL) |
| Orlando Storm | Teton Saltes | T | New Mexico |
| St. Louis Battlehawks | Mike Panasiuk | C | Michigan State |
| St. Louis Battlehawks | Spencer Rolland | G | North Carolina |

=== Phase 2: Defensive Front Seven (Linebackers, Defensive Ends, Defensive Tackles) ===
| Team | Player | Position | College |
|---|---|---|---|
| Birmingham Stallions | T. J. Carter | DI | Kentucky |
| Birmingham Stallions | Izayah Green-May | EDGE | Northern Illinois |
| Birmingham Stallions | Amani Bledsoe | DI | Oklahoma |
| Birmingham Stallions | Olakunle Fatukasi | LB | Rutgers |
| Birmingham Stallions | Kyahva Tezino | LB | San Diego State |
| Columbus Aviators | Caeveon Patton | DI | Texas State |
| Columbus Aviators | Storey Jackson | LB | Liberty |
| Columbus Aviators | Prince Emili | DI | Penn |
| Columbus Aviators | Ron Stone Jr. | EDGE | Washington State |
| Columbus Aviators | Nelson Ceaser | EDGE | Houston |
| Columbus Aviators | Xavier Benson | LB | Oklahoma State |
| Columbus Aviators | Olive Sagapolu | DI | Wisconsin |
| Dallas Renegades | Antwuan Jackson | DI | Ohio State |
| Dallas Renegades | TJ Franklin | EDGE | Baylor |
| Dallas Renegades | Carson Wells | EDGE | Colorado |
| Dallas Renegades | Callahan O'Reilly | LB | Montana State |
| Dallas Renegades | Andrew Dowell | LB | Michigan State |
| Dallas Renegades | Kalen DeLoach | LB | Florida State |
| Dallas Renegades | J.T. Tyler | LB | Princeton |
| DC Defenders | Durrell Johnson | EDGE | Liberty |
| DC Defenders | Devonnsha Maxwell | DI | Chattanooga |
| DC Defenders | Dennis Johnson | DI | Grand Valley State |
| DC Defenders | Brian Abraham | EDGE | Albany |
| DC Defenders | Ferrod Gardner | LB | Louisiana |
| DC Defenders | Phil Hoskins | DI | Kentucky |
| Houston Gamblers | Kyon Barrs | DI | USC |
| Houston Gamblers | Jerrod Clark | EDGE | Coastal Carolina |
| Houston Gamblers | Ikenna Enechukwu | DI | Rice |
| Houston Gamblers | Lonnie Phelps | EDGE | Kansas |
| Houston Gamblers | Shaka Toney | EDGE | Penn State |
| Houston Gamblers | Malik Fisher | DE | Villanova |
| Houston Gamblers | Charlie Thomas III | LB | Georgia Tech |
| Louisville Kings | DeVere Levelston | EDGE | SMU |
| Louisville Kings | Myjai Sanders | EDGE | Cincinnati |
| Louisville Kings | LaRon Stokes | DI | Oklahoma |
| Louisville Kings | Jamir Jones | EDGE | Notre Dame |
| Louisville Kings | Shayne Simon | LB | Pittsburgh |
| Louisville Kings | Benning Potoa'e | DI | Washington |
| Orlando Storm | Chris Garrett | EDGE | Concordia–St. Paul |
| Orlando Storm | Isaiah Mack | DL | Chattanooga |
| Orlando Storm | Maximilian Roberts | EDGE | Boston College |
| Orlando Storm | Willie Yarbary | DL | Wake Forest |
| St. Louis Battlehawks | Carlos Davis | DL | Nebraska |
| St. Louis Battlehawks | Jordan Williams | LB | Baylor |
| St. Louis Battlehawks | Mike Rose | LB | Iowa State |
| St. Louis Battlehawks | Steve Linton | EDGE | Baylor |
| St. Louis Battlehawks | Taylor Stallworth | DL | South Carolina |

=== Phase 3: Running Backs/Tight Ends/Wide Receivers ===
| Team | Player | Position | College |
|---|---|---|---|
| Birmingham Stallions | Anthony McFarland Jr. | RB | Maryland |
| Birmingham Stallions | Daewood Davis | WR | Western Kentucky |
| Birmingham Stallions | Jaydon Mickens | WR | Washington |
| Birmingham Stallions | Marcus Simms | WR | West Virginia |
| Birmingham Stallions | Samson Nacua | WR | BYU |
| Columbus Aviators | ZaQuandre White | RB | South Carolina |
| Columbus Aviators | Amari Rodgers | WR | Clemson |
| Columbus Aviators | Briley Moore | TE | Kansas State |
| Columbus Aviators | John Lovett | RB | Penn State |
| Columbus Aviators | Keke Chism | WR | Missouri |
| Dallas Renegades | Curtis Hodges | TE | Arizona State |
| Dallas Renegades | Denzel Mims | WR | Baylor |
| Dallas Renegades | Greg Ward Jr. | WR | Houston |
| DC Defenders | Abram Smith | RB | Baylor |
| DC Defenders | Javon Antonio | WR | Colorado |
| DC Defenders | Trae Barry | TE | Boston College |
| DC Defenders | Seth Williams | WR | Auburn |
| DC Defenders | Ben Bresnahan | TE | Vanderbilt |
| Houston Gamblers | Braylon Sanders | WR | Ole Miss |
| Houston Gamblers | Cam Sutton | TE | Fresno State |
| Houston Gamblers | Kai Locksley | WR | UTEP |
| Houston Gamblers | Lujuan Winningham | WR | Central Arkansas |
| Houston Gamblers | Nate McCrary | RB | Saginaw Valley State |
| Louisville Kings | Jalen Wydermyer | TE | Texas A&M |
| Louisville Kings | Jaden Shirden | RB | Monmouth |
| Louisville Kings | Isaiah Winstead | WR | East Carolina |
| Louisville Kings | Kalen Ballage | RB | Arizona State |
| Louisville Kings | Thomas Burke | TE | College of New Jersey |
| Orlando Storm | Chris Rowland | WR | Tennessee State |
| Orlando Storm | Jerome Kapp | WR | Kutztown |
| Orlando Storm | Marquez Stevenson | WR | Houston |
| Orlando Storm | Sam Wiglusz | WR | Ohio |
| St. Louis Battlehawks | Blake Jackson | WR | Mary Hardin-Baylor |
| St. Louis Battlehawks | Gary Jennings Jr. | WR | West Virginia |
| St. Louis Battlehawks | Justin Smith | WR | Norfolk State |

=== Phase 4: Defensive Backs ===
| Team | Player | Position | College |
|---|---|---|---|
| Birmingham Stallions | Lukas Denis | CB | Boston College |
| Birmingham Stallions | JoJo Tillery | S | Wofford |
| Birmingham Stallions | Lance Boykin | CB | Coastal Carolina |
| Columbus Aviators | Kyree Woods | CB | San Diego State |
| Columbus Aviators | Nehemiah Shelton | CB | San Jose State |
| Columbus Aviators | Shyheim Carter | CB | Alabama |
| Columbus Aviators | Shawn Preston Jr. | S | Mississippi State |
| Columbus Aviators | Harry Black | S | Baylor |
| Dallas Renegades | Qwynnterrio Cole | S | Louisville |
| Dallas Renegades | Chris Steele | CB | USC |
| Dallas Renegades | Brandon Sebastian | CB | Boston College |
| Dallas Renegades | Armani Marsh | CB | Washington State |
| DC Defenders | Deontay Anderson | S | Houston |
| DC Defenders | Leon O'Neal Jr. | S | Texas A&M |
| DC Defenders | Kiondre Thomas | CB | Kansas State |
| DC Defenders | Sam Kidd | S | James Madison |
| DC Defenders | Kai Nacua | S | BYU |
| Houston Gamblers | Carlton Johnson | CB | Fresno State |
| Houston Gamblers | Nico Bolden | S | Kent State |
| Houston Gamblers | Kary Vincent Jr. | CB | LSU |
| Houston Gamblers | Avery Young | S | Rutgers |
| Louisville Kings | Rayshad Williams | CB | Texas Tech |
| Louisville Kings | Corey Mayfield | CB | UTSA |
| Louisville Kings | Kenny Robinson Jr. | S | West Virginia |
| Orlando Storm | Chris Claybrooks | CB | Memphis |
| Orlando Storm | Nate Meadors | S | UCLA |
| Orlando Storm | Micah Abraham | CB | Marshall |
| Orlando Storm | Ravarius Rivers | DB | Valdosta State |
| St. Louis Battlehawks | Daniel Isom | CB | Washington State |
| St. Louis Battlehawks | AJ Thomas | S | Western Michigan |
| St. Louis Battlehawks | Jordan Mosley | S | Maryland |
| St. Louis Battlehawks | Sean Fresch | CB | Rice |

== Free Agents Draft ==
=== Phase 1: Offensive Linemen ===
| Team | Player | Position | College |
|---|---|---|---|
| Birmingham Stallions | Wesley French | T | Western Michigan |
| Birmingham Stallions | Tyrese Robinson | G | Oklahoma |
| Birmingham Stallions | Jackson Carman | T | Clemson |
| Birmingham Stallions | Andrew Raym | C | Oklahoma |
| Birmingham Stallions | Jonathan Mendoza | T | Louisville |
| Columbus Aviators | Matthew Jones | G | Ohio State |
| Columbus Aviators | Caleb Jones | T | Indiana |
| Columbus Aviators | Bless Harris | T | TCU |
| Columbus Aviators | Chris Glaser | G | Virginia Tech |
| Dallas Renegades | Trevor Reid | T | Louisville |
| Dallas Renegades | Raiqwon O'Neal | G | UCLA |
| Dallas Renegades | Josiah Ezirim | T | Eastern Kentucky |
| Dallas Renegades | Tremayne Anchrum | T | Clemson |
| Dallas Renegades | Mike Novitsky | C | Kansas |
| DC Defenders | Jaelyn Duncan | T | Maryland |
| DC Defenders | Parker Clements | T | Virginia Tech |
| DC Defenders | Michael Tarquin | T | Oklahoma |
| DC Defenders | Silas Dzansi | T | Virginia Tech |
| DC Defenders | Elijah Ellis | T | Marshall |
| Houston Gamblers | Jalen McKenzie | T | USC |
| Houston Gamblers | Jordan Williams | T | Georgia Tech |
| Houston Gamblers | Zachary Thomas | T | San Diego State |
| Houston Gamblers | Gareth Warren | G | Lindenwood |
| Louisville Kings | LeRoy Watson | T | UTSA |
| Louisville Kings | Doug Kramer | C | Illinois |
| Louisville Kings | Matthew Cindric | C | California |
| Louisville Kings | Logan Bruss | G | Wisconsin |
| Louisville Kings | Earl Bostick Jr. | T | Kansas |
| Orlando Storm | Jason Ivey | T | North Carolina A&T |
| Orlando Storm | Joey Fisher | G | Shepherd |
| Orlando Storm | Michael Gonzalez | G | Louisville |
| Orlando Storm | Mike Edwards | G | Campbell |
| Orlando Storm | Mose Vavao | G | Fresno State |
| St. Louis Battlehawks | Jarrod Hufford | G | Iowa State |
| St. Louis Battlehawks | Corey Stewart | T | Purdue |
| St. Louis Battlehawks | Aiden Williams | T | Minnesota-Duluth |
| St. Louis Battlehawks | Javion Cohen | G | Miami (FL) |
| St. Louis Battlehawks | Addison West | G | Western Michigan |
| St. Louis Battlehawks | Wyatt Bowles | G | Utah State |
| St. Louis Battlehawks | Richard Gouraige | T | Florida |

=== Phase 2: Defensive Front Seven (Linebackers, Defensive Ends, Defensive Tackles) ===
| Team | Player | Position | College |
|---|---|---|---|
| Birmingham Stallions | Omari Thomas | DT | Tennessee |
| Birmingham Stallions | Dyontae Johnson | LB | Toledo |
| Birmingham Stallions | Cameron Young | DT | Mississippi State |
| Birmingham Stallions | Stone Blanton | LB | Mississippi State |
| Birmingham Stallions | James Carpenter | DT | Indiana |
| Birmingham Stallions | DaRon Gilbert | LB | Northern Illinois |
| Columbus Aviators | J.B. Brown | LB | Kansas |
| Columbus Aviators | Amaré Barno | DE | Virginia Tech |
| Columbus Aviators | Khris Bogle | DE | Michigan State |
| Columbus Aviators | Amari Burney | LB | Florida |
| Columbus Aviators | Isaiah Thomas | DE | Oklahoma |
| Columbus Aviators | Anthony Butler | LB | Liberty |
| Dallas Renegades | Jah Joyner | DE | Minnesota |
| Dallas Renegades | Myles Cole | DT | Texas Tech |
| Dallas Renegades | DaMarcus Mitchell | DE | Purdue |
| Dallas Renegades | Chace Davis | DE | Bowling Green |
| Dallas Renegades | Matt Jones | LB | Baylor |
| DC Defenders | Desmond Watson | DT | Florida |
| DC Defenders | Curtis Jacobs | LB | Penn State |
| DC Defenders | Kyron Johnson | LB | Kansas |
| DC Defenders | Patrick Jenkins | DT | Tulane |
| Houston Gamblers | Eugene Asante | LB | Auburn |
| Houston Gamblers | Seth Coleman | DE | Illinois |
| Houston Gamblers | Mitchell Agude | DE | Miami (FL) |
| Houston Gamblers | Toby Ndukwe | EDGE | Sam Houston State |
| Houston Gamblers | Solomon DeShields | LB | Texas A&M |
| Louisville Kings | Monty Rice | LB | Georgia |
| Louisville Kings | Xavier Carlton | DE | California |
| Louisville Kings | Jaheim Thomas | LB | Wisconsin |
| Louisville Kings | Christopher Hinton | DT | Michigan |
| Louisville Kings | Dallas Gant | LB | Toledo |
| Louisville Kings | Travis Bell | DT | Kennesaw State |
| Orlando Storm | Jasheen Davis | DE | Wake Forest |
| Orlando Storm | Pheldarius Payne | DE | Virginia Tech |
| Orlando Storm | DaShaun White | LB | Oklahoma |
| Orlando Storm | Keshawn Banks | DE | San Diego State |
| Orlando Storm | Darien Butler | LB | Arizona State |
| Orlando Storm | Grayson Murphy | LB | UCLA |
| Orlando Storm | Deion Jennings | LB | Rutgers |
| St. Louis Battlehawks | Michael Dwumfour | DT | Rutgers |
| St. Louis Battlehawks | Raymond Johnson | DE | Georgia Southern |
| St. Louis Battlehawks | Abraham Beauplan | LB | Marshall |
| St. Louis Battlehawks | Nesta Jade Silvera | DT | Arizona State |
| St. Louis Battlehawks | Neil Farrell | DT | LSU |

=== Phase 3: Running Backs/Tight Ends/Wide Receivers ===
| Team | Player | Position | College |
|---|---|---|---|
| Birmingham Stallions | Justyn Ross | WR | Clemson |
| Birmingham Stallions | Laviska Shenault Jr. | WR | Colorado |
| Birmingham Stallions | Nate Noel | RB | Missouri |
| Birmingham Stallions | Anthony Torres | TE | Toledo |
| Birmingham Stallions | Mario Williams | WR | Tulane |
| Birmingham Stallions | Cameron Echols-Luper | WR | Western Kentucky |
| Columbus Aviators | Landon Parker | WR | Troy |
| Columbus Aviators | Tyreik McAllister | RB | Charleston |
| Columbus Aviators | Roc Taylor | WR | Memphis |
| Columbus Aviators | Tay Martin | WR | Oklahoma State |
| Columbus Aviators | Raheem Blackshear | RB | Virginia Tech |
| Columbus Aviators | Easop Winston Jr. | WR | Washington State |
| Columbus Aviators | Gee Scott Jr. | TE | Ohio State |
| Dallas Renegades | Peyton Hendershot | TE | Indiana |
| Dallas Renegades | Isaiah Spiller | RB | Texas A&M |
| Dallas Renegades | Keegan Jones | RB | UCLA |
| Dallas Renegades | Chase Cota | WR | Oregon |
| Dallas Renegades | Ellis Merriweather | RB | UMass |
| Dallas Renegades | Miles Boykin | WR | Notre Dame |
| Dallas Renegades | Silas Bolden | WR | Texas |
| DC Defenders | Zack Kuntz | TE | Old Dominion |
| DC Defenders | Xazavian Valladay | RB | Arizona State |
| DC Defenders | Montrell Washington | WR | Samford |
| DC Defenders | Jalen Virgil | WR | Appalachian State |
| Houston Gamblers | Marcus Yarns | RB | Delaware |
| Houston Gamblers | Monaray Baldwin | WR | Baylor |
| Houston Gamblers | Marcus Major | RB | Minnesota |
| Houston Gamblers | Caeleb Bass | TE | West Alabama |
| Louisville Kings | Tarik Black | WR | Texas |
| Louisville Kings | Tre' McKitty | TE | Georgia |
| Louisville Kings | Kaden Prather | WR | Maryland |
| Louisville Kings | Lynn Bowden | WR | Kentucky |
| Louisville Kings | Benny Snell | RB | Kentucky |
| Louisville Kings | Irv Smith | TE | Alabama |
| Orlando Storm | Aron Cruickshank | WR | Rutgers |
| Orlando Storm | Tre Stewart | RB | Jacksonville State |
| Orlando Storm | JJ Galbreath | TE | South Dakota |
| Orlando Storm | Stevo Klotz | TE | Iowa State |
| Orlando Storm | Cam Camper | WR | Boise State |
| Orlando Storm | Jordan Bly | WR | Gardner-Webb |
| St. Louis Battlehawks | Jordan Waters | RB | NC State |
| St. Louis Battlehawks | Thayer Thomas | WR | NC State |
| St. Louis Battlehawks | Kylin James | RB | UNLV |
| St. Louis Battlehawks | Jha'Quan Jackson | WR | Tulane |
| St. Louis Battlehawks | Tyler Neville | TE | Virginia |
| St. Louis Battlehawks | Lideatrick Griffin | WR | Mississippi State |

=== Phase 4: Defensive Backs ===
| Team | Player | Position | College |
|---|---|---|---|
| Birmingham Stallions | Alex Cook | S | Washington |
| Birmingham Stallions | Davion Ross | CB | Memphis |
| Birmingham Stallions | Shaquan Loyal | S | Rutgers |
| Birmingham Stallions | Omar Jarvis Jr. | CB | SUNY-Morrisville |
| Birmingham Stallions | Ryan Cooper | CB | Oregon State |
| Birmingham Stallions | Hudson Clark | S | Arkansas |
| Columbus Aviators | Cam Smith | CB | South Carolina |
| Columbus Aviators | Josh Thompson | S | Texas |
| Columbus Aviators | Israel Mukuamu | CB | South Carolina |
| Columbus Aviators | Tre'Von Jones | CB | Minnesota |
| Columbus Aviators | Marcus Barnes | S | William & Mary |
| Dallas Renegades | D. J. James | CB | Auburn |
| Dallas Renegades | Tra Fluellen | CB | Middle Tennessee |
| Dallas Renegades | Bobby Price | CB | Norfolk State |
| DC Defenders | Ekow Boye-Doe | CB | Kansas State |
| DC Defenders | Lewis Cine | S | Georgia |
| DC Defenders | Azizi Hearn | CB | UCLA |
| DC Defenders | Gabe Taylor | CB | Rice |
| Houston Gamblers | Glendon Miller | S | Maryland |
| Houston Gamblers | BJ Mayes | CB | Texas A&M |
| Houston Gamblers | LaMareon James | CB | TCU |
| Houston Gamblers | Isaiah Dunn | CB | Oregon State |
| Houston Gamblers | Ra'Mello Dotson | CB | Kansas |
| Houston Gamblers | Quinton Newsome | CB | Nebraska |
| Houston Gamblers | Clarence Lewis | CB | Syracuse |
| Louisville Kings | Andrew Booth | CB | Clemson |
| Louisville Kings | Deantre Prince | CB | Ole Miss |
| Louisville Kings | Quindell Johnson | S | Memphis |
| Louisville Kings | Isaiah Bolden | CB | Jackson State |
| Orlando Storm | Mishael Powell | S | Miami (FL) |
| Orlando Storm | Lamar Jackson | CB | Nebraska |
| Orlando Storm | Jaylen Mahoney | S | Vanderbilt |
| Orlando Storm | Allan George | CB | Vanderbilt |
| Orlando Storm | Christian Matthew | CB | Valdosta State |
| Orlando Storm | Jason Taylor II | S | Oklahoma State |
| St. Louis Battlehawks | Luq Barcoo | CB | San Diego State |
| St. Louis Battlehawks | Nate Brooks | CB | North Texas |

=== Phase 5: Specialists ===
| Team | Player | Position | College |
|---|---|---|---|
| Birmingham Stallions | Jonathan Garibay | K | Texas Tech |
| Birmingham Stallions | Colby Wadman | P | UC Davis |
| Birmingham Stallions | Rodrigo Blankenship | K | Georgia |
| Columbus Aviators | Payton Bunch | LS | Virginia |
| Dallas Renegades | Antonio Ortiz | LS | TCU |
| Dallas Renegades | Colton Theaker | K | Washington State |
| Dallas Renegades | Brendan Hall | K | Montana State |
| Houston Gamblers | John Hoyland | K | Wyoming |
| Houston Gamblers | Marco Ortiz | LS | Nebraska |
| Houston Gamblers | Mike Rivers | P | Troy |
| Louisville Kings | Tanner Brown | K | Oklahoma State |
| Louisville Kings | Mac Brown | P | Ole Miss |
| Orlando Storm | Alex Matheson | LS | Cal Lutheran |
| Orlando Storm | Michael Lantz | K | USC |
| Orlando Storm | Jack Browning | P | San Diego State |
| St. Louis Battlehawks | Matthew Hembrough | LS | Oklahoma State |
| St. Louis Battlehawks | Ryan Sanborn | P | Texas |
| St. Louis Battlehawks | Tucker McCann | K | Missouri |

=== Phase 6: Open ===
| Team | Player | Position | College |
|---|---|---|---|
| Dallas Renegades | Tramel Walthour | DE | Georgia |
| Dallas Renegades | Rodrick Daniels Jr. | WR | SMU |
| Dallas Renegades | Shaun Wade | CB | Ohio State |
| Dallas Renegades | Te’Rai Powell | DB | UMass |
| DC Defenders | Maliq Carr | TE | Houston |
| DC Defenders | Maceo Beard | S | International |
| DC Defenders | Niles Scott | DI | Frostburg State |
| DC Defenders | Kyle Phillips | EDGE | Tennessee |
| DC Defenders | Davin Bellamy | EDGE | Georgia |
| DC Defenders | Josh Ball | T | Marshall |
| DC Defenders | Nicholas Petit-Frere | T | Ohio State |
| DC Defenders | Grant DuBose | WR | Charlotte |
| Louisville Kings | RJ Oben | DE | Notre Dame |
| Louisville Kings | Dez Fitzpatrick | WR | Louisville |
| Louisville Kings | Florian Bierbaumer | TE | International |
| Orlando Storm | Mark Gilbert | CB | Duke |
| Orlando Storm | T. J. Pesefea | DI | Arizona State |
| Orlando Storm | Lyle Santos | G | Southern Utah |
| Orlando Storm | Kole Taylor | TE | West Virginia |
| Orlando Storm | Josh Minkins | S | Cincinnati |
| Orlando Storm | Jayden Peevy | DT | Texas A&M |
| St. Louis Battlehawks | Tariq Carpenter | LB | Georgia Tech |
| St. Louis Battlehawks | Kelly Akharaiyi | WR | Mississippi State |
| St. Louis Battlehawks | Dillon Johnson | RB | Washington |
| St. Louis Battlehawks | Nevelle Clarke | CB | UCF |
| St. Louis Battlehawks | Taylor Morin | WR | Wake Forest |
| St. Louis Battlehawks | Jonathan Sutherland | LB | Penn State |
| St. Louis Battlehawks | Ozzie Hutchinson | G | Albany |
| St. Louis Battlehawks | Luke Masterson | LB | Wake Forest |
