= Colorado Stampede =

Professional American football team

- Current season
Logo
Wordmark

General information
- Founded: September 23, 2026; 51 days ago
- Stadium: Weidner Field; Colorado Springs, Colorado
- Colors: Bison brown, gold rush, canyon red, summit white
- Website: www.theufl.com/colorado

Personnel
- Owner: League owned
- Head coach: Rick Neuheisel

Team history
- Colorado Stampede (2027–present)

Home fields
- Weidner Field (2027–present)

League / conference affiliations
- United Football League (2027)

The Colorado Stampede is a professional American football team based in Colorado Springs, Colorado. The team will compete in the United Football League (UFL). They are planned to begin play in 2027. The team, along with the rest of the league, is owned and operated by a consortium led by Mike Repole, and will play their home games at Weidner Field.

== History ==
The Colorado UFL team was announced on September 23, 2026. It is one of two new teams set to begin play in 2027, along with the Rhode Island Breakers.

Colorado Springs has never hosted professional football at any level. The only other professional outdoor football to play in the state of Colorado (other than the NFL's Broncos) was the Denver Gold, who played 70 miles (110 km) north (via I-25) of Colorado Springs in Denver in the original USFL in the 1980s. The Gold was, reputedly, the only USFL team to have ever been profitable, due to strong attendance and exceptionally frugal spending.

On September 30, 2026, the UFL announced that Rick Neuheisel would move over from the Dallas Renegades to become Colorado's head coach, returning him to the state where he first found success as a head coach of the Colorado Buffaloes football team from 1995 to 1998. Under the terms of the reassignment, the entirety of the Renegades roster will be reassigned to Colorado.

The team's name and colors were unveiled in a public ceremony on October 25, 2026. The branding borrows heavily from the Colorado Buffaloes, including a charging buffalo head as its logo and a color scheme that similarly heavily features black and gold.

== Current roster ==
Colorado Stampede roster
Quarterbacks (QB): 10 Luke Lehnen; -- Sawyer Robertson; Running backs (RB): 0 Dae Dae Hunter; 20 Keegan Jones; 28 Lorenzo Lingard; 35 Ellis Merriweather; Wide receivers (WR): 2 Deontay Burnett; 17 Emmanuel Butler; 13 Drake Stoops; 1 Tyler Vaughns; -- David Wallis; 84 Greg Ward; Tight ends (TE): 87 Seth Green; 8 Curtis Hodges	Offensive linemen (OL): 75 Alex Akingbulu T; 73 Tremayne Anchrum T; 74 Josiah Ezirim T; -- Jacoby Jackson G; 65 Marcus Minor G; 60 Mike Novitsky C; 79 Raiqwon O'Neal T; 66 Corey Stewart T; 78 Keaton Sutherland G; 71 Sam Tecklenburg C; Defensive linemen (DL): 4 Tashawn Bower DE; 69 Domenique Davis DT; 96 T. J. Franklin DE; 63 Siaki Ika NT; 52 Antwuan Jackson DT; 92 Darrius Moragne DT; 77 Kevin Strong DT; 90 Tramel Walthour DE	Linebackers (LB): 33 Taco Charlton OLB; -- Diwun Black OLB; -- Cam Bright LB; 19 Kalen DeLoach LB; 51 Andrew Dowell OLB; 9 Matt Jones MLB; 47 Eyabi Okie-Anoma OLB; 18 Donald Payne LB; -- Marvin Pierre LB; 50 Willie Taylor III OLB; 32 J. T. Tyler OLB; Defensive backs (DB): 3 Qwynnterrio Cole FS; 26 Tra Fluellen FS; 5 Ajene Harris CB; 6 Steven Jones Jr. CB; 25 Armani Marsh CB; 21 Te'Rai Powell S; 27 Bobby Price CB; 22 Chris Steele CB; Special teams (ST): 93 Brendan Hall P; 49 Antonio Ortiz LS; 45 Colton Theaker K	53 active As of November 2, 2026. Rookies in italics.: Roster

== Player history ==
=== Notable players ===
Season	Pos	Name	Notes
2027–present	WR	Denzel Mims	Former New York Jets wide receiver, 2020 2nd round pick

== Coach history ==
=== Head coaches ===
#	Coach	Term	Regular season				Playoffs			Awards
#	Coach	Term	GC	W	L	Win %	GC	W	L	Awards
Colorado Stampede
1	Rick Neuheisel	2027–present	-	-	-	-	-	-	-	

=== Offensive coordinators ===
#	Coach	Term	Regular season				Playoffs			Awards
#	Coach	Term	GC	W	L	Win %	GC	W	L	Awards
Colorado Stampede
1	Noel Mazzone	2027–present	-	-	-	-	-	-	-	

=== Defensive coordinators ===
#	Coach	Term	Regular season				Playoffs			Awards
#	Coach	Term	GC	W	L	Win %	GC	W	L	Awards
Colorado Stampede
1	Mike Gillhamer	2027–present	-	-	-	-	-	-	-	
