= Kevin Strong =

American football player (born 1996)

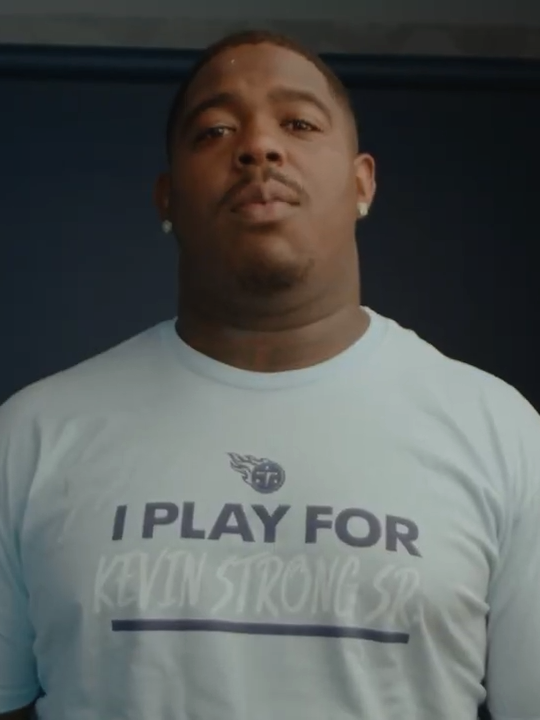
- Strong in 2022

No. 77 – Colorado Stampede
- Position: Defensive tackle
- Roster status: Active

Personal information
- Born: August 5, 1996 (age 30); Houston, Texas, U.S.
- Listed height: 6 ft 3 in (1.91 m)
- Listed weight: 289 lb (131 kg)

Career information
- High school: Cleveland (Cleveland, Texas)
- College: UTSA (2014–2018)
- NFL draft: 2019: undrafted

Career history
- Detroit Lions (2019–2021); Tennessee Titans (2021–2022); Arizona Cardinals (2023); Los Angeles Rams (2024)*; Dallas Renegades (2026); Colorado Stampede (2027–present)
- * Offseason or practice squad member only

Awards and highlights
- Second-team All-Conference USA (2017)

Career NFL statistics
- Total tackles: 95
- Sacks: 3.5
- Fumble recoveries: 1
- Pass deflections: 4
- Stats at Pro Football Reference

Kevin Strong Jr. (born August 5, 1996) is an American professional football defensive tackle for the Colorado Stampede of the United Football League (UFL). He played college football for the UTSA Roadrunners before graduating in 2018. He signed as an undrafted free agent with the Detroit Lions in 2019.

== College career ==
Strong was a member of the UTSA Roadrunners for five seasons, redshirting his freshman year. As a junior, Strong was named second-team All-Conference USA after recording 27 tackles, seven tackles for loss and three sacks. He finished his collegiate career with 106 tackles (26.5 for loss), 7.5 sacks, three pass deflections, two forced fumbles, a fumble recovery and two blocked kicks in 47 games played (40 starts).

== Professional career ==
Pre-draft measurables
Height	Weight	Arm length	Hand span	Wingspan	40-yard dash	10-yard split	20-yard split	20-yard shuttle	Three-cone drill	Vertical jump	Broad jump	Bench press
6 ft 2 5/8 in (1.90 m)	289 lb (131 kg)	32 3/4 in (0.83 m)	10 1/8 in (0.26 m)	6 ft 7 3/8 in (2.02 m)	5.26 s	1.81 s	3.02 s	4.88 s	7.95 s	30.5 in (0.77 m)	8 ft 10 in (2.69 m)	17 reps
All values from Pro Day

=== Detroit Lions ===
Strong signed with the Detroit Lions as an undrafted free agent on May 10, 2019. He made his NFL debut on September 8, against the Arizona Cardinals. On November 12, Strong was placed on injured reserve after a season-ending injury. He finished his rookie season with five tackles and a pass defended in eight games played.

On September 5, 2020, Strong was waived by the Lions and re-signed to the practice squad the following day. He was elevated to the active roster on September 19 for the team's Week 2 game against the Green Bay Packers, and reverted to the practice squad after the game. Strong was released by the Lions on November 11. He was re-signed to the team's practice squad on December 1, and was promoted to the active roster the next day. In Week 17 against the Minnesota Vikings, Strong recorded his first career sack on Kirk Cousins during the 37–35 loss.

On September 25, 2021, Strong was placed on injured reserve. He was activated on November 2. Strong was waived by Detroit on November 20.

=== Tennessee Titans ===
Strong signed with the Tennessee Titans' practice squad on November 23, 2021. He was promoted to the active roster on January 8, 2022.

=== Arizona Cardinals ===
On March 15, 2023, Strong signed a one-year contract with the Cardinals. He was released on January 5, 2024.

=== Los Angeles Rams ===
On December 3, 2024, Strong was signed to the Los Angeles Rams' practice squad.

=== Dallas Renegades ===
On February 24, 2026, Strong signed with the Dallas Renegades of the United Football League (UFL).
