= Sawyer Robertson =

American football player (born 2003)

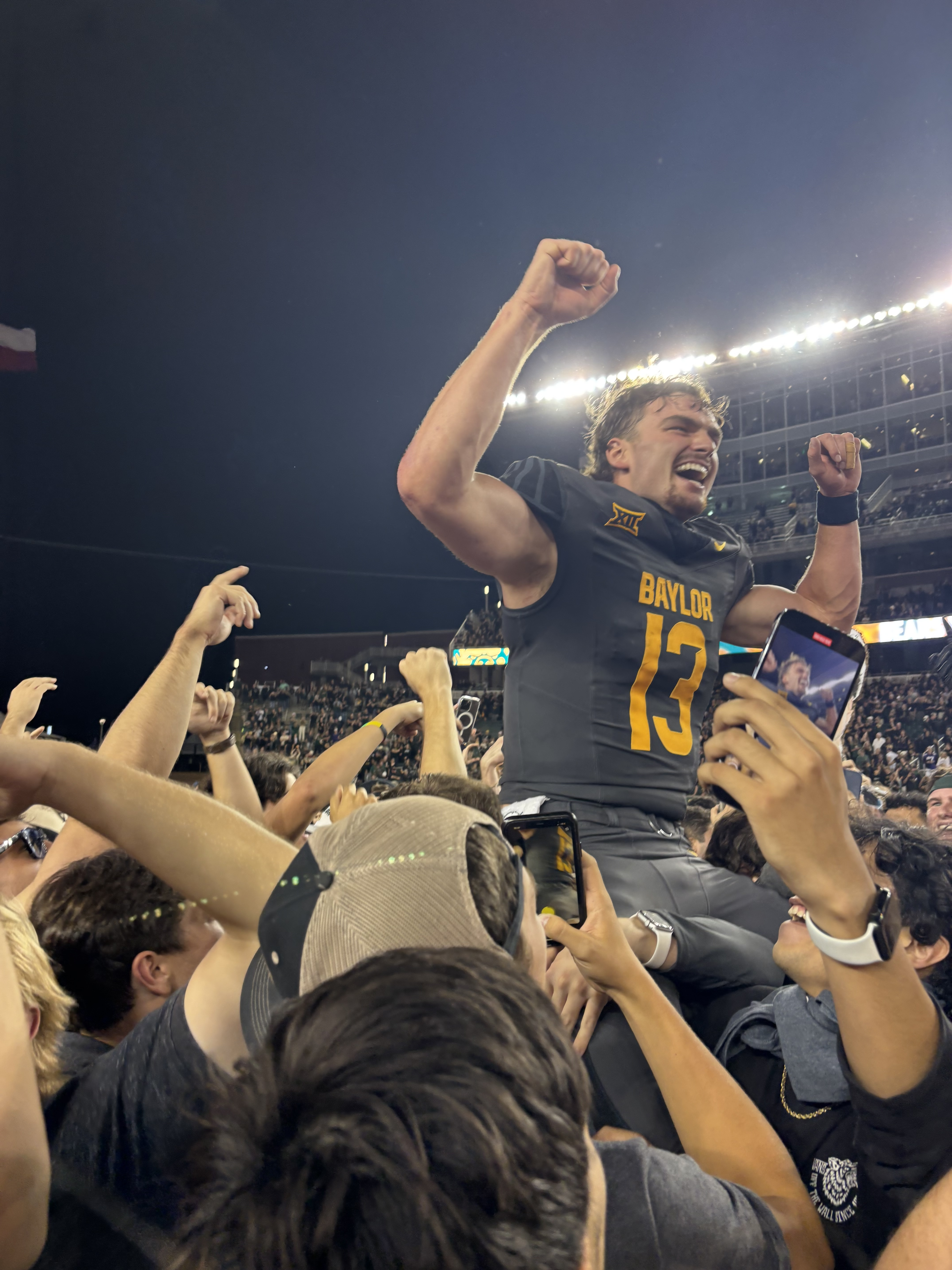
- Robertson after beating TCU on November 2, 2024

Colorado Stampede
- Position: Quarterback
- Roster status: Active

Personal information
- Born: February 1, 2003 (age 23); Lubbock, Texas, U.S.
- Listed height: 6 ft 4 in (1.93 m)
- Listed weight: 216 lb (98 kg)

Career information
- High school: Coronado (Lubbock, Texas)
- College: Mississippi State (2021–2022); Baylor (2023–2025)
- NFL draft: 2026: undrafted

Career history
- Colorado Stampede (2027–present)

Awards and highlights
- Second-team All-Big 12 (2025)
- Stats at ESPN

Sawyer James Robertson (born February 1, 2003) is an American professional football quarterback for the Colorado Stampede of the United Football League (UFL). Robertson played college football for the Mississippi State Bulldogs and Baylor Bears. He went undrafted in the 2026 NFL draft.

== Early life ==
Robertson was born on February 1, 2003, in Lubbock, Texas. He attended Coronado High School in Lubbock where he lettered in football and baseball. In his high school career, he completed 877 of 1,359 pass attempts for 12,148 yards and 146 touchdowns to 22 interceptions, and rushed for 553 yards and 13 touchdowns. Robertson was rated a four-star recruit and committed to play college football at Mississippi State University over offers from Arizona State, Arkansas, Florida State, Louisiana, Louisville, Nevada, SMU, TCU, Texas, Tulsa, USC, Washington State and Wisconsin.

== College career ==
=== Mississippi State ===
As a freshman in 2021, Robertson was redshirted. In 2022, he completed six of 11 passes for 23 yards and an interception in five games played.

On January 4, 2023, Robertson announced that he would be entering the transfer portal following the death of Mississippi State coach Mike Leach.

=== Baylor ===
On January 11, 2023, Robertson announced that he would be transferring to Baylor. In 2023, he played in six games and was named as the starting quarterback against Utah after Blake Shapen had suffered an injury. Robertson finished the season completing 66 of 117 passing attempts for 864 yards, two touchdowns and four interceptions, while also making 35 rushing attempts for 69 yards and a touchdown. In 2024, he threw for 2,626 yards and 26 touchdowns as Baylor finished with an 8–5 record (including a 6–3 conference record) and lost 44–31 to LSU in the Texas Bowl.

=== Statistics ===
| Season | Team | Games | | | Passing | | | | | | | | Rushing | | | |
| Season | Team | GP | GS | Record | Cmp | Att | Pct | Yds | Y/A | TD | Int | Rtg | Att | Yds | Avg | TD |
|---|---|---|---|---|---|---|---|---|---|---|---|---|---|---|---|---|
| 2021 | Mississippi State | Redshirt (redshirt) | | | | | | | | | | | | | | |
| 2022 | Mississippi State | 5 | 0 | — | 6 | 11 | 54.5 | 23 | 2.1 | 0 | 1 | 53.9 | 2 | 0 | 0.0 | 0 |
| 2023 | Baylor | 6 | 4 | 1−3 | 66 | 117 | 56.4 | 864 | 7.4 | 2 | 4 | 117.2 | 35 | 69 | 2.0 | 1 |
| 2024 | Baylor | 12 | 11 | 7−4 | 229 | 368 | 62.2 | 3,071 | 8.3 | 28 | 8 | 153.1 | 63 | 230 | 3.7 | 4 |
| 2025 | Baylor | 12 | 12 | 5−7 | 304 | 504 | 60.3 | 3,681 | 7.3 | 31 | 12 | 137.2 | 56 | 17 | 0.3 | 3 |
| Career | | 35 | 27 | 13−14 | 605 | 1,000 | 60.5 | 7,639 | 7.6 | 61 | 25 | 139.8 | 156 | 316 | 2.0 | 8 |

== Professional career ==
Pre-draft measurables
| Height | Weight | Arm length | Hand span | Wingspan | 40-yard dash | 10-yard split | 20-yard split | 20-yard shuttle | Three-cone drill | Vertical jump | Broad jump |
|---|---|---|---|---|---|---|---|---|---|---|---|
| 6 ft 3 3/4 in (1.92 m) | 216 lb (98 kg) | 32 1/8 in (0.82 m) | 9 3/8 in (0.24 m) | 6 ft 6 3/4 in (2.00 m) | 4.64 s | 1.61 s | 2.72 s | 4.46 s | 7.45 s | 37.5 in (0.95 m) | 10 ft 3 in (3.12 m) |
All values from NFL Combine

During June 2026, Robertson participated in the Denver Broncos' minicamp as a tryout.

=== Colorado Stampede ===
On November 2, 2026, Robertson was signed to the Colorado Stampede's training camp roster after attending a league showcase event in Houston.

== Personal life ==
Robertson's father Stan Robertson was drafted by the Montreal Expos in the first round of the 1990 MLB draft and following a career ending injury, played college football at Texas Tech. Robertson is the cousin of Denver Broncos quarterback Jarrett Stidham.
