= Malik Fisher =

American football player (born 1999)

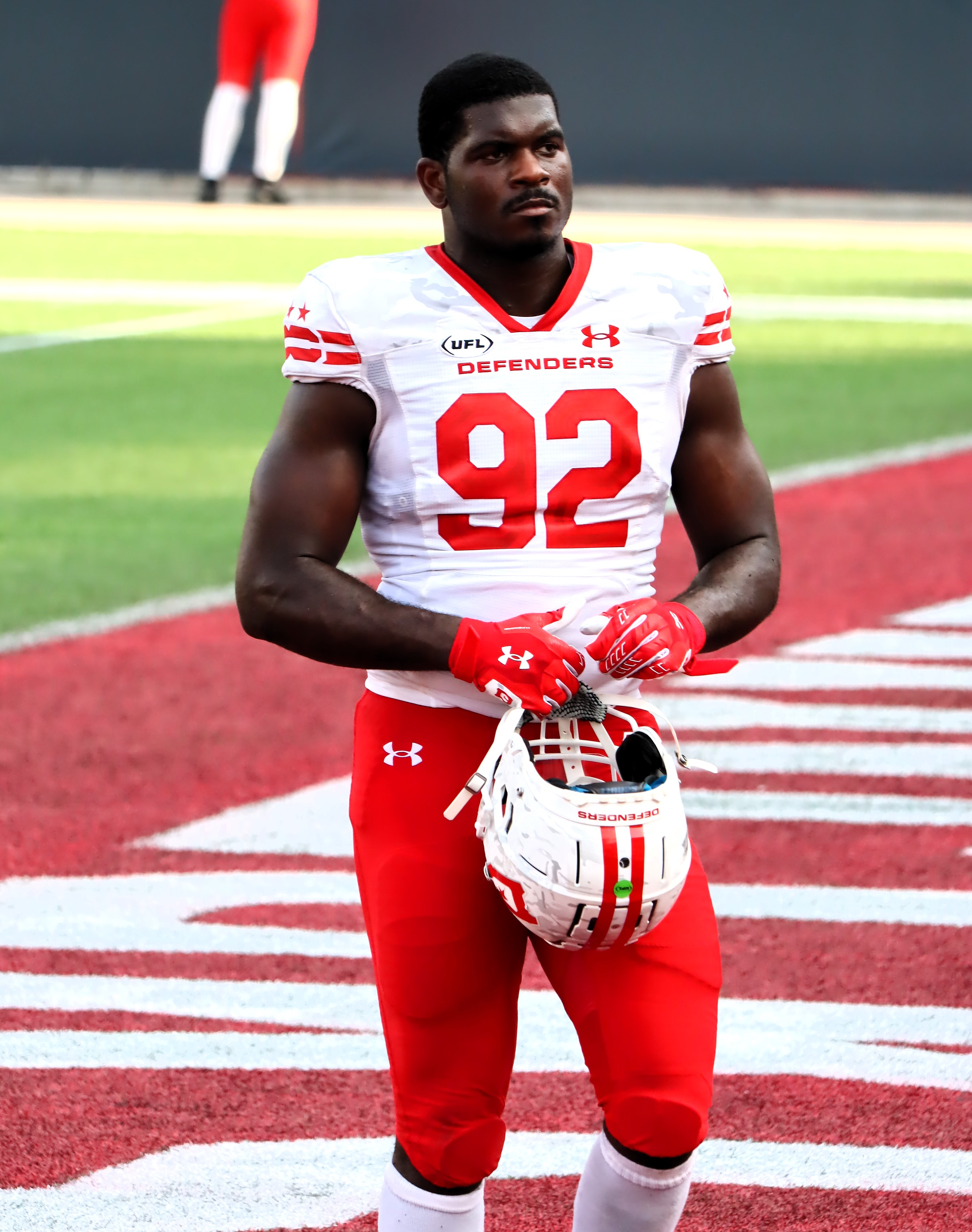
- Fisher with the DC Defenders in 2025

No. 92 – Dallas Renegades
- Position: Defensive end
- Roster status: Active

Personal information
- Born: January 28, 1999 (age 27); New York, New York, U.S.
- Listed height: 6 ft 3 in (1.91 m)
- Listed weight: 260 lb (118 kg)

Career information
- High school: Xavier (New York, New York)
- College: Villanova (2017–2021)
- NFL draft: 2022: undrafted

Career history
- DC Defenders (2023–2024); Houston Texans (2024)*; DC Defenders (2025); Houston Gamblers (2026); Dallas Renegades (2027–present)
- * Offseason or practice squad member only

Awards and highlights
- UFL champion (2025); All-CAA First-team (2020); All-CAA Second-team (2021); All-CAA Third-team (2019)
- Stats at Pro Football Reference

Malik Fisher (born January 28, 1999) is an American football defensive end for the Dallas Renegades of the United Football League (UFL). He played college football at Villanova and has played for the Houston Texans of the National Football League (NFL).

== College career ==
Fisher played college football at Villanova, where he earned First Team All-CAA in 2020, Second Team in 2021, and Third Team in 2019.

== Professional career ==
Pre-draft measurables
Height	Weight	Arm length	Hand span	Wingspan
6 ft 3 1/2 in (1.92 m)	262 lb (119 kg)	32 3/4 in (0.83 m)	9 1/2 in (0.24 m)	6 ft 6 7/8 in (2.00 m)
All values from Pro Day

=== DC Defenders (first stint) ===
On January 6, 2024, Fisher signed with the DC Defenders of the XFL. In two season with DC, Fisher recorded over 39 tackles, and 7 sacks. After the 2024 UFL season, Fisher worked out with the Baltimore Ravens.

=== Houston Texans ===
On July 16, 2024, Fisher was signed by the Houston Texans of the National Football League (NFL). He was released on August 27, 2024, but was re-signed to the practice squad the next day. He was released on September 2, 2024.

=== DC Defenders (second stint) ===
On January 22, 2025, Fisher re-signed with the DC Defenders.

=== Houston Gamblers ===
On January 13, 2026, Fisher was selected by the Houston Gamblers in the 2026 UFL draft.
