= Domenique Davis =

American football player (born 1996)

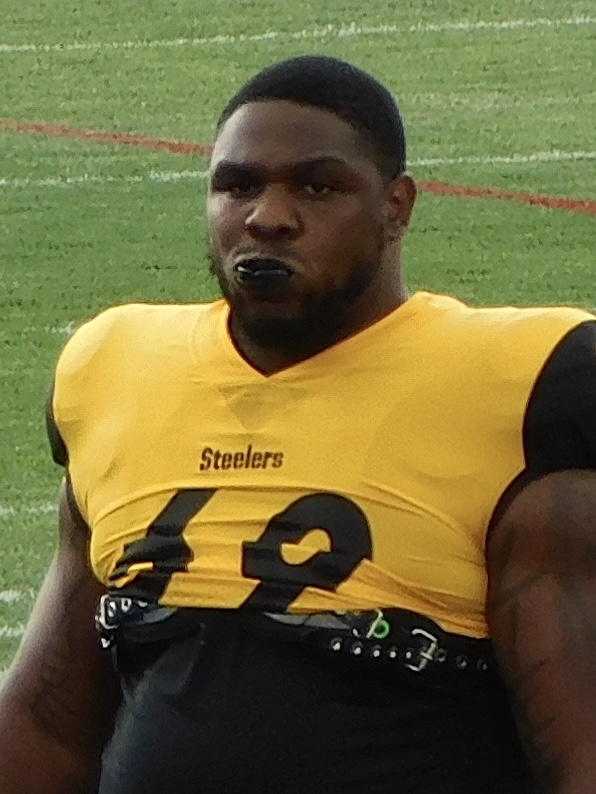
- Davis with the Pittsburgh Steelers in 2025

No. 69 – Colorado Stampede
- Position: Defensive tackle
- Roster status: Active

Personal information
- Born: February 28, 1996 (age 30); Laurinburg, North Carolina, U.S.
- Listed height: 6 ft 2 in (1.88 m)
- Listed weight: 315 lb (143 kg)

Career information
- High school: Scotland (Laurinburg)
- College: Shaw (2014); UNC Pembroke (2017–2019)
- NFL draft: 2020: undrafted

Career history
- New York Jets (2020)*; Houston Gamblers (2022); Cincinnati Bengals (2022–2024); Pittsburgh Steelers (2024)*; Cincinnati Bengals (2024)*; Pittsburgh Steelers (2025); Dallas Renegades (2026); Colorado Stampede (2027–present)
- * Offseason or practice squad member only

Career NFL statistics as of 2024
- Total tackles: 3
- Stats at Pro Football Reference

Domenique Davis (born February 28, 1996) is an American professional football defensive tackle for the Colorado Stampede of the United Football League (UFL). He played college football for the UNC Pembroke Braves.

== Professional career ==
Pre-draft measurables
Height	Weight
6 ft 2 1/8 in (1.88 m)	315 lb (143 kg)
Values from Pro Day

=== New York Jets ===
After going undrafted in the 2020 NFL draft, Davis signed with the New York Jets on April 25, 2020. On July 31, Davis was released by the Jets with a failed physical designation.

=== Houston Gamblers ===
On February 23, 2022, Davis was drafted by the Houston Gamblers of the United States Football League (USFL) in the 26th round of the 2022 USFL draft. Playing in 10 games for Houston, Davis recorded 24 solo tackles and 4 sacks.

=== Cincinnati Bengals (first stint) ===
On July 26, 2022, Davis signed with the Cincinnati Bengals. He was cut on August 30, but signed to the practice squad the next day. On October 31 Davis was elevated to the active roster ahead of a Monday Night showdown against the Cleveland Browns due to starting nose tackle D. J. Reader's knee injury. Later that day he made his debut playing 20 snaps and recording 2 tackles. On November 5, Davis was signed to the active roster, and later waived on November 8, and resigned to the practice squad the next day. He signed a reserve/future contract with the Bengals on January 31, 2023.

Davis was waived on August 29, 2023, and re-signed to the practice squad the next day. Davis was signed to the Bengals' active roster on December 22, 2023, due to D. J. Reader going down with a season ending quadriceps injury. He was released on December 25 and re-signed to the practice squad two days later. Following the end of the 2023 regular season, the Bengals signed him to a reserve/future contract on January 8, 2024.

Davis was waived by the Bengals on August 27, 2024, and re-signed to the practice squad. He was released on October 22.

=== Pittsburgh Steelers (first stint) ===
On November 6, 2024, Davis was signed to the practice squad of the Pittsburgh Steelers. He was released on December 6.

=== Cincinnati Bengals (second stint) ===
On December 24, 2024, Davis was signed to the Cincinnati Bengals practice squad.

=== Pittsburgh Steelers (second stint) ===
On January 14, 2025, Davis signed a reserve/future contract with the Pittsburgh Steelers. He was waived on July 25. Davis was re-signed on July 29. He was waived on August 26 with an injury designation as part of final roster cuts and reverted to injured reserve the following day. On October 28, Davis was released from injured reserve.

=== Dallas Renegades ===
On January 21, 2026, Davis signed with the Dallas Renegades of the United Football League (UFL).
