= Bobby Price =

American football player (born 1998)

No. 27 – Colorado Stampede
- Position: Cornerback
- Roster status: Active

Personal information
- Born: April 25, 1998 (age 28); Virginia Beach, Virginia, U.S.
- Listed height: 6 ft 3 in (1.91 m)
- Listed weight: 205 lb (93 kg)

Career information
- High school: Bishop Sullivan Catholic (Virginia Beach)
- College: Norfolk State (2016–2019)
- NFL draft: 2020: undrafted

Career history
- Detroit Lions (2020–2022); Arizona Cardinals (2023); Washington Commanders (2024); Dallas Renegades (2026); Colorado Stampede (2027–present)

Career NFL statistics as of 2025
- Total tackles: 28
- Fumble recoveries: 1
- Pass deflections: 3
- Stats at Pro Football Reference

Bobby Miguel Price (born April 25, 1998) is an American professional football cornerback for the Colorado Stampede of the United Football League (UFL). He played college football for the Norfolk State Spartans and signed with the Detroit Lions as an undrafted free agent in 2020. Price has also played for the Arizona Cardinals and Washington Commanders.

== College career ==
Price was born in Virginia Beach, Virginia, and is of Puerto Rican descent. He played college football at Norfolk State. During his freshman season, he played in nine games, and started four games at free safety. During his sophomore season, he started in all 11 games and ranked fourth on the team, and tied for 18th in the Mid-Eastern Athletic Conference (MEAC) with 69 tackles. During his junior season, he started all 10 games he played and ranked fourth on the team with 59 tackles. He also posted 2.5 tackles-for-loss, two interceptions, deflected eight passes, recovered two fumbles, and tied for fourth in the MEAC with 10 passes defended. Following the season he earned All-MEAC third-team honors. Price also participated with the NSU track and field team in the spring, where he placed fourth in the long jump at the MEAC indoor championships in February, and won the MEAC outdoor long jump championship, with a personal-best jump of 25 feet, 10.25 inches.

During his senior season, he started all 12 games at strong safety and finished the season with 73 tackles, including 2.5 tackles-for-loss, eight pass breakups, recovered two fumbles, and returned his lone interception 84-yards for a touchdown. He ranked 16th in the MEAC in tackles, 10th in passes defended and tied for third in fumble recoveries. Following the season he earned All-MEAC second-team honors. Price finished his career with 229 tackles, eight for loss, seven interceptions, 23 pass breakups and four fumble recoveries.

== Professional career ==
Pre-draft measurables
Height	Weight
6 ft 3 in (1.91 m)	205 lb (93 kg)
Values from HBCU Combine

=== Detroit Lions ===
Price signed with the Detroit Lions as an undrafted free agent on May 1, 2020. He was waived during final roster cuts on September 5, 2020, and signed to the team's practice squad the next day. He was elevated to the active roster on December 5 and December 12 for the team's weeks 13 and 14 games against the Chicago Bears and Green Bay Packers, and reverted to the practice squad after each game. On January 2, 2021, Price was promoted to the active roster. On October 22, 2022, Price was placed on injured reserve.

=== Arizona Cardinals ===
On June 5, 2023, Price signed with the Arizona Cardinals. He was waived on August 29, 2023, and re-signed to the practice squad. On October 26, 2023, Price was signed to the active roster. He was placed on injured reserve on November 7, 2023. He was activated on December 30, 2023. On August 27, 2024, he was waived by the Cardinals as part of final roster cuts before the start of the 2024 season.

=== Washington Commanders ===
On August 28, 2024, Price signed with the Washington Commanders' practice squad. He re-signed with the team on February 10, 2025, and was released on August 26.

=== Dallas Renegades ===
On January 13, 2026, Price was selected by the Dallas Renegades in the 2026 UFL Draft.
