= Josiah Ezirim =

American football player (born 2001)

No. 74 – Colorado Stampede
- Position: Offensive tackle
- Roster status: Active

Personal information
- Born: May 21, 2001 (age 25); Hilliard, Ohio, U.S.
- Listed height: 6 ft 6 in (1.98 m)
- Listed weight: 328 lb (149 kg)

Career information
- High school: Hilliard Davidson
- College: Eastern Kentucky (2019–2023)
- NFL draft: 2024: 7th round, 239th overall pick

Career history
- New Orleans Saints (2024–2025)*; Dallas Renegades (2026); Colorado Stampede (2027–present)
- * Offseason or practice squad member only

Awards and highlights
- Third-team FCS All-American (2023); First-team All-UAC (2023)
- Stats at Pro Football Reference

Josiah Nnamdi Ezirim (born May 21, 2001) is an American professional football offensive tackle for the Colorado Stampede of the United Football League (UFL). He played college football for the Eastern Kentucky Colonels and was selected by the Saints in the seventh round of the 2024 NFL draft.

== Early life ==
Ezirim was born on May 21, 2001, the oldest of four children, and grew up in Hilliard, Ohio. His father was a Nigerian immigrant and soccer player for the Ohio State Buckeyes who later played professionally. Ezirim played flag football beginning at age five and also played soccer and basketball growing up. He attended Hilliard Davidson High School and won two varsity letters as a defensive lineman, totaling 39 tackles and three sacks at defensive end in 2017, then 67 tackles, three sacks and a forced fumble at nose tackle in 2018 while being named all-conference and helping Hilliard Davidson win the conference championship. Ezirim also played for the track and field team in high school, completing in shot put, the discus throw, sprinting and relays.

== College career ==
A three-star recruit, Ezirim committed to play college football for the Eastern Kentucky Colonels; he had other offers from larger schools including the Cincinnati Bearcats, but declined as he, according to The Athletic, "didn't want anything to do with the offensive line", and wanted to be sure he would not play there. He enrolled at Eastern Kentucky in 2019 and also was a member of the school's indoor track team for a time. He played in 10 games as a true freshman in 2019, recording three tackles, and then played in six games with nine tackles in 2020.

In 2021, Ezirim was told he might have better opportunities if he moved to the offensive line, and, considering that he had a mere 12 tackles and no starts in his first two years on defense, he accepted the offer. He appeared in five games as a backup that year, but then became a top player at right tackle in his last two seasons. He appeared in all 12 games in 2022 and was chosen fourth-team All-ASUN. In his final year, 2023, he started 11 games and was named first-team All-United Athletic Conference (UAC) as well as a third-team FCS All-American by the Associated Press (AP). He was invited to the East–West Shrine Bowl and to the NFL Scouting Combine.

== Professional career ==
Pre-draft measurables
Height	Weight	Arm length	Hand span	Wingspan	40-yard dash	10-yard split	20-yard split	Vertical jump	Broad jump	Bench press
6 ft 5 3/4 in (1.97 m)	329 lb (149 kg)	35 3/4 in (0.91 m)	10 3/4 in (0.27 m)	7 ft 1 1/8 in (2.16 m)	5.15 s	1.92 s	3.02 s	29.5 in (0.75 m)	9 ft 5 in (2.87 m)	28 reps
All values from NFL Combine/Pro Day

=== New Orleans Saints ===
Ezirim was selected in the seventh round (239th overall) of the 2024 NFL draft by the New Orleans Saints. He was waived on August 27, and re-signed to the practice squad.

Ezirim signed a reserve/future contract on January 6, 2025. On August 25, Ezirim was waived by the Saints.

=== Dallas Renegades ===
On January 13, 2026, Ezirim was selected by the Dallas Renegades in the 2026 UFL Draft.
