= T. J. Pesefea =

American football player (born 2000)

No. 93
- Position: Defensive tackle

Personal information
- Born: June 25, 2000 (age 26); Sacramento, California, U.S.
- Listed height: 6 ft 3 in (1.91 m)
- Listed weight: 314 lb (142 kg)

Career information
- High school: Foothill (Sacramento)
- College: American River (2018); Arizona State (2019–2022)
- NFL draft: 2023: undrafted

Career history
- Cincinnati Bengals (2023); St. Louis Battlehawks (2024–2025); Orlando Storm (2026)*
- * Offseason or practice squad member only

Tautala "TJ" Pesefea Jr. (born June 25, 2000) is an American professional football defensive tackle. He played college football for American River and Arizona State. He began his professional career with the Cincinnati Bengals of the National Football League (NFL) as an undrafted free agent in 2023.

== Early life ==
Pesefea was born in Sacramento, California. He attended Foothill High School where at 6 ft 4 in (1.93 m) and 270 pounds (120 kg), he was a two-sport athlete, playing basketball and football. In football, he played tight end and defensive end with the Foothill Mustangs. Pesefea graduated in 2018 and was rated a three-star collegiate recruiting prospect.

== College career ==
Pesefea first enrolled at American River College where he played in nine games during the 2018 season alongside the American River Beavers. He finished his first season of college football with 17 tackles.

In 2019, Pesefea transferred to Arizona State University where he played his sophomore season as a defensive lineman with the Sun Devils. He played in 40 games, redshirting his junior and senior seasons, finishing with 76 total tackles. While at Arizona State, he majored in liberal studies.

== Professional career ==
=== Cincinnati Bengals ===
Pesefea signed with the Cincinnati Bengals on May 12, 2023. He played three preseason games before an elbow injury moved him to the injured reserve list. He was later waived on September 12, 2023.

=== St. Louis Battlehawks ===
On August 14, 2024, Pesefea signed with the St. Louis Battlehawks of the United Football League (UFL).

=== Orlando Storm ===
On January 14, 2026, Pesefea was selected by the Orlando Storm in the 2026 UFL Draft, reuniting with his head coach from the Battlehawks, Anthony Becht. He was released on March 12.

== Personal life ==
Pesefea is third of four children born to Tautala Pesefea Sr. and Annie Chang. He has a brother named Nick Pesefea-Chang. At eight years of age, Pesefea was run over by a car. During his high school years, Pensefea's survival story gained him Most Inspirational Player of the Year.
