= Ajene Harris =

American football player (born 1996)

No. 5 – Colorado Stampede
- Position: Cornerback
- Roster status: Active

Personal information
- Born: June 1, 1996 (age 30); Los Angeles, California, U.S.
- Listed height: 5 ft 10 in (1.78 m)
- Listed weight: 189 lb (86 kg)

Career information
- High school: Crenshaw (Los Angeles, California)
- College: USC (2014–2018)
- NFL draft: 2019: undrafted

Career history
- Philadelphia Eagles (2019)*; Houston Roughnecks (2020); BC Lions (2021)*; Pittsburgh Maulers (2022); Houston Roughnecks (2023); Arlington / Dallas Renegades (2024–2026); Colorado Stampede (2027–present)
- * Offseason or practice squad member only

Awards and highlights
- 2× All-UFL Team (2024, 2025); UFL interceptions leader (2025); All-XFL Team (2023); XFL interceptions leader (2023)
- Stats at Pro Football Reference

Ajene Harris (born June 1, 1996) is an American professional football cornerback for the Colorado Stampede of the United Football League (UFL). He played college football at USC Trojans football, and has also played for the Philadelphia Eagles of the National Football League (NFL).

== College career ==
Harris played college football at USC from 2014 to 2018. In his career, Harris had 142 tackles, 1.5 sacks, six interceptions (three for a touchdown), two forced fumbles and two fumble recoveries. He appeared in 43 games in his career, with 24 starts.

== Professional career ==
Pre-draft measurables
Height	Weight	Arm length	Hand span	Wingspan	40-yard dash	10-yard split	20-yard split	20-yard shuttle	Three-cone drill	Vertical jump	Broad jump	Bench press
5 ft 10 1/8 in (1.78 m)	181 lb (82 kg)	30 3/4 in (0.78 m)	9 3/8 in (0.24 m)	6 ft 2 7/8 in (1.90 m)	4.62 s	1.62 s	2.71 s	4.19 s	6.84 s	30.0 in (0.76 m)	9 ft 3 in (2.82 m)	9 reps
All values from Pro Day

=== Philadelphia Eagles ===
After going undrafted in the 2019 NFL draft, Harris signed with the Philadelphia Eagles on August 6, 2019. He was released on August 31, 2019, but re-signed to the practice squad on September 12. He was released on October 1, 2019. He was re-signed again on October 9 but was released on October 29, 2019.

=== Houston Roughnecks (first stint) ===
Harris signed with the Houston Roughnecks of the XFL in January 2020. He finished the season playing and starting in five games with 23 tackles before the XFL canceled the rest of their season due to the COVID-19 Pandemic. He had his contract terminated when the league suspended operations on April 10, 2020.

=== BC Lions ===
On March 11, 2021, Harris signed with the BC Lions of the Canadian Football League (CFL). Harris was released June 29, 2021.

=== Pittsburgh Maulers ===
On February 22, 2022, Harris was selected by the Pittsburgh Maulers of the United States Football League (USFL). He was released on April 20, 2022.

=== Houston Roughnecks (second stint) ===
Harris was selected by the Houston Roughnecks on November 15, 2022, returning after a three-year hiatus. In 2023, he was the XFL Interceptions Leader with five interceptions. He was also named to the 2023 All-XFL Team. He finished the 2023 season starting and playing in nine games, with 31 tackles and five interceptions. The Roughnecks brand was transferred to the Houston Gamblers when the XFL and United States Football League (USFL) merged to create the United Football League (UFL).

=== Arlington Renegades ===
On January 5, 2024, Harris was selected by the Arlington Renegades during the 2024 UFL dispersal draft. He was named to the 2024 All-UFL team on June 5, 2024. In Week 4 of the 2025 UFL season, Harris would intercept St. Louis Battlehawks Quarterback Max Duggan and set a UFL record with the longest interception return at 102 yards. He would be named the UFL defensive player of the week. The next week, Harris would continue his success and win a second straight Defensive Player of the Week award for his performance against the DC Defenders, having six total tackles and two interceptions in the close 37-33 loss. Harris would finish the 2025 season leading the league in interceptions and be named to the 2025 All-UFL Team.
