= Ellis Merriweather =

American football player (born 1999)

No. 35 – Colorado Stampede
- Position: Running back
- Roster status: Active

Personal information
- Born: April 7, 1999 (age 27); Atlanta, Georgia, U.S.
- Listed height: 6 ft 1 in (1.85 m)
- Listed weight: 220 lb (100 kg)

Career information
- High school: Alpharetta (GA)
- College: Garden City CC (2018–2019); UMass (2020–2022)
- NFL draft: 2023: undrafted

Career history
- New Orleans Saints (2023)*; Green Bay Packers (2023–2024); Dallas Renegades (2026); Colorado Stampede (2027–present)
- * Offseason or practice squad member only
- Stats at Pro Football Reference

Ellis Merriweather (born April 7, 1999) is an American professional football running back for the Colorado Stampede of the United Football League (UFL). He played college football for the Garden City Broncbusters and UMass Minutemen.

== Early life ==
Merriweather attended Alpharetta High School in Alpharetta, Georgia, where he rushed for 556 yards and six touchdowns and brought in ten receptions for 77 yards. He committed to play college football at Garden City Community College.

== College career ==
=== Garden City ===
In two seasons at Garden City, Merriweather rushed for 910 yards and ten touchdowns in 18 games.

=== UMass ===
After two season with Garden City, Merriweather transferred to UMass. In 2020 he had 115 rushing yards and one reception for four yards. In week 6, Merriweather rushed 39 times for 171 yards and two touchdowns as he helped UMass get their first win on the season beating UConn 27-13. In UMass's season finale, he ran the ball 23 times for 168 yards and two touchdowns in a loss to New Mexico State. Merriweather finished his breakout 2021 season with 218 carries for 1,138 yards and five touchdowns, along with hauling in 22 receptions for 165 yards and a touchdown. In week 11 of the 2022 season, he rushed for 122 yards and two touchdowns in a loss to Arkansas State. Merriweather finished the 2022 season with 150 carries for 575 yards and three touchdowns, while notching eight receptions for 48 yards.

Merriweather finished his UMass career with 410 carries for 1,828 yards and eight touchdowns, while talling 31 receptions for 217 yards and a touchdown.

== Professional career ==
Pre-draft measurables
Height	Weight	Arm length	Hand span	Wingspan	40-yard dash	10-yard split	20-yard split	20-yard shuttle	Three-cone drill	Vertical jump	Broad jump	Bench press
6 ft 1 in (1.85 m)	220 lb (100 kg)	33 1/4 in (0.84 m)	9 3/4 in (0.25 m)	6 ft 5 1/2 in (1.97 m)	4.68 s	1.62 s	2.72 s	4.31 s	7.17 s	34.5 in (0.88 m)	9 ft 6 in (2.90 m)	19 reps
All values from Pro Day

=== New Orleans Saints ===
After not being selected in the 2023 NFL draft, Merriweather signed with the New Orleans Saints as an undrafted free agent. He was waived on August 29, 2023 and re-signed to the practice squad, but released the next day.

=== Green Bay Packers ===
On November 6, 2023, Merriweather was signed to the Green Bay Packers practice squad. He signed a reserve/future contract on January 22, 2024.

On August 27, 2024, Merriweather was released by the Packers and re-signed to the practice squad. On December 24, the Packers placed Merriweather on practice squad injured reserve.

=== Houston Roughnecks ===
On September 2, 2025, Merriweather signed with the Houston Roughnecks of the United Football League (UFL).

=== Dallas Renegades ===
On January 13, 2026, Merriweather was selected by the Dallas Renegades in the 2026 UFL Draft.
