= Qwynnterrio Cole =

American football player (born 1999)

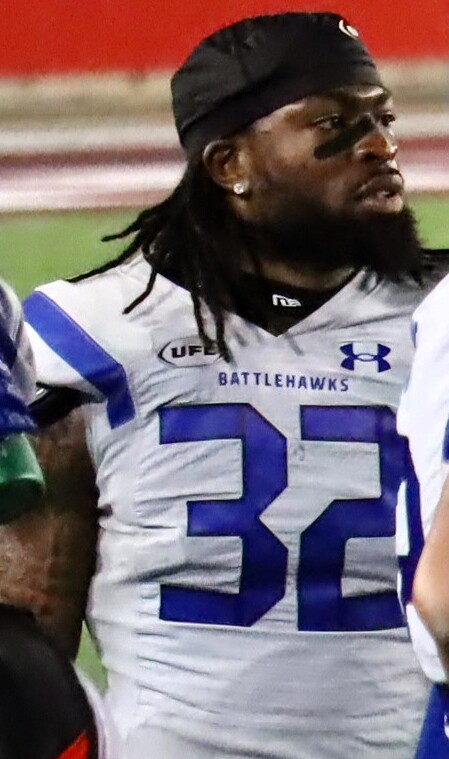
- Cole in 2025

No. 3 – Colorado Stampede
- Position: Safety
- Roster status: Active

Personal information
- Born: May 27, 1999 (age 27); Memphis, Tennessee, U.S.
- Listed height: 6 ft 0 in (1.83 m)
- Listed weight: 216 lb (98 kg)

Career information
- High school: East (Memphis)
- College: Alcorn State (2017–2020); Louisville (2021)
- NFL draft: 2022: undrafted

Career history
- Las Vegas Raiders (2022)*; Seattle Sea Dragons (2023); St. Louis Battlehawks (2024–2025); Dallas Renegades (2026); Colorado Stampede (2027–present)
- * Offseason or practice squad member only

Awards and highlights
- First-team All-SWAC (2018)
- Stats at Pro Football Reference

Qwynnterrio Cole (born May 27, 1999) is an American professional football safety for the Colorado Stampede of the United Football League (UFL). He played college football for the Alcorn State Braves and the Louisville Cardinals and was signed by the Las Vegas Raiders as an undrafted free agent in 2022. He has also played for the Seattle Sea Dragons of the XFL, and the St. Louis Battlehawks and Dallas Renegades.

== Early life ==
Cole, originally from Memphis, Tennessee, began playing football at the local East High School and then committed to play college football at Alcorn State University.

== College career ==
Cole won the conference title with the Alcorn State Braves in 2018 and 2019, with Cole playing all the games as a starter in 2019. In both seasons he was named first-team All-Southwestern Athletic Conference.

In the 2020 season, however, due to the COVID-19 pandemic which forced the Braves to cancel several games, Cole was only able to practice.

In 2021, Cole had the option to enter the 2021 NFL draft but chose to stay in college football for another year and transferred to the University of Louisville with the Cardinals. In his only year at Louisville, Cole started every game of the season, recording a total of 86 tackles, 65 of which were solo, making him second on the team.

In early 2022, Cole, having completed his college football career and eligible for the 2022 NFL draft, was invited to participate in the NFL Scouting Combine.

=== College statistics ===
| Year | Team | Games | | Defense | | | | | | |
| Year | Team | GP | GS | Int | Yds | Avg | TD | Solo | Ast | Tot |
|---|---|---|---|---|---|---|---|---|---|---|
| 2017 | Alcorn State | 12 | 0 | 0 | 0 | 0.0 | 0 | 5 | 3 | 8 |
| 2018 | Alcorn State | **13** | 7 | 3 | 36 | 12.00 | **1** | 43 | 34 | 77 |
| 2019 | Alcorn State | **13** | 12 | **5** | **61** | 12.20 | 0 | 49 | **37** | **86** |
| 2020 | Alcorn State | Redshirt (redshirt) | | | | | | | | |
| 2021 | Louisville | **13** | **13** | 1 | 29 | **29.00** | 0 | **65** | 21 | **86** |
| Career | | 51 | 32 | 9 | 126 | 14.00 | 1 | 162 | 95 | 257 |

Career personal bests are in bold

== Professional career ==
Pre-draft measurables
| Height | Weight | Arm length | Hand span | Wingspan | 40-yard dash | 10-yard split | 20-yard split | 20-yard shuttle | Three-cone drill | Vertical jump | Broad jump | Bench press |
|---|---|---|---|---|---|---|---|---|---|---|---|---|
| 6 ft 0 1/8 in (1.83 m) | 206 lb (93 kg) | 31 7/8 in (0.81 m) | 10 3/8 in (0.26 m) | 6 ft 4 3/4 in (1.95 m) | 4.83 s | 1.69 s | 2.76 s | 4.20 s | 6.92 s | 35.5 in (0.90 m) | 10 ft 0 in (3.05 m) | 16 reps |
All values from NFL Scouting Combine/Pro Day

=== Las Vegas Raiders ===
Cole was not selected in the 2022 NFL draft and signed as an undrafted free agent with the Las Vegas Raiders on May 12, 2022. On August 30, 2022, Cole was released by the team during final roster cuts.

=== Seattle Sea Dragons ===
On November 17, 2022, Cole was drafted by the Seattle Sea Dragons of the XFL. The Sea Dragons folded when the XFL and United States Football League merged to create the United Football League (UFL).

=== St. Louis Battlehawks ===
On January 5, 2024, Cole was selected by the St. Louis Battlehawks during the 2024 UFL dispersal draft. He re-signed with the team on August 15, 2024.

=== Dallas Renegades ===
On January 13, 2026, Cole was selected by the Dallas Renegades in the 2026 UFL Draft.

=== Colorado Stampede ===
Following the creation of the Colorado Stampede, the entire Renegades roster was transferred to the Stampede.
