= Mike Novitsky =

American football player (born 1999)

No. 60 – Colorado Stampede
- Position: Center
- Roster status: Active

Personal information
- Born: December 17, 1999 (age 26); Victor, New York, U.S.
- Listed height: 6 ft 4 in (1.93 m)
- Listed weight: 300 lb (136 kg)

Career information
- High school: Victor Senior
- College: Buffalo (2018–2020); Kansas (2021–2023)
- NFL draft: 2024: undrafted

Career history
- Seattle Seahawks (2024)*; Dallas Renegades (2026); Colorado Stampede (2027–present)
- * Offseason or practice squad member only

Awards and highlights
- Second-team All-Big 12 (2022); First-team All-MAC (2020)

Michael Novitsky (born December 17, 1999) is an American professional football center or the Colorado Stampede of the United Football League (UFL). He played college football for the Buffalo Bulls and Kansas Jayhawks and was signed by the Seattle Seahawks as an undrafted free agent in 2024.

== College career ==
Novitsky played college football at Buffalo. He then transferred to Kansas.

== Professional career ==
Pre-draft measurables
Height	Weight	Arm length	Hand span	Wingspan	40-yard dash	10-yard split	20-yard split	20-yard shuttle	Three-cone drill	Vertical jump	Broad jump	Bench press
6 ft 3 5/8 in (1.92 m)	309 lb (140 kg)	32 1/2 in (0.83 m)	9 3/4 in (0.25 m)	6 ft 5 5/8 in (1.97 m)	5.35 s	1.88 s	3.07 s	4.91 s	8.07 s	25.0 in (0.64 m)	8 ft 10 in (2.69 m)	23 reps
All values from Pro Day

=== Seattle Seahawks ===
After going undrafted in the 2024 NFL draft, on May 3, 2024, Novitsky signed a three-year, $2.8325 million contract with the Seattle Seahawks. He was waived on August 5. Novitksy was signed to the Seahawks practice squad again on December 3. He signed a reserve/future contract on January 6, 2025.

On April 29, 2025, Novitsky was waived by the Seahawks.

=== Dallas Renegades ===
On January 13, 2026, Novitsky was selected by the Dallas Renegades in the 2026 UFL Draft.
