= Tra Fluellen =

American football player (born 2001)

Travion Fluellen
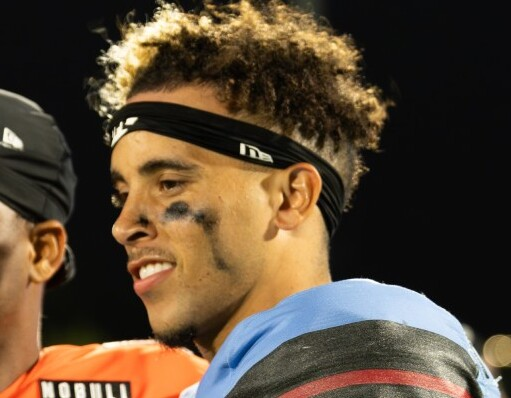
- Fluellen with the Dallas Renegades in 2026

No. 26 – Colorado Stampede
- Position: Safety
- Roster status: Active

Personal information
- Born: March 22, 2001 (age 25); Gilmer, Texas, U.S.
- Listed height: 6 ft 0 in (1.83 m)
- Listed weight: 212 lb (96 kg)

Career information
- High school: Gilmer
- College: Houston Baptist (2019–2020); Middle Tennessee (2021–2023)
- NFL draft: 2024: undrafted

Career history
- New Orleans Saints (2024–2025)*; Dallas Renegades (2026); Green Bay Packers (2026)*; Colorado Stampede (2027–present)
- * Offseason or practice squad member only
- Stats at Pro Football Reference

Travion "Tra" Fluellen (/fluːˈɛlən/ floo-ELL-ən; born March 22, 2001) is an American professional football safety for the Colorado Stampede of the United Football League (UFL). He played college football for the Houston Baptist Huskies and the Middle Tennessee Blue Raiders.

== Early life ==
Travion Fluellen was born on March 22, 2001, in Gilmer, Texas. He attended Gilmer High School in Gilmer, Texas, where he participated in football, basketball, and track. During his senior year, Fluellen recorded 46 receptions for 1,006 yards as a wide receiver.

== College career ==
Fluellen enrolled at Houston Baptist University, playing as a safety from 2019 to 2020. In his freshman year (2019), he recorded 101 tackles and 2 interceptions, and getting a place on the HERO Sports Freshman All-America First Team and a finalist position for the Jerry Rice Award. In 2020, he contributed 25 tackles and 1 interception.

In 2021, Fluellen transferred to Middle Tennessee State University (MTSU), where he played three seasons (2021–2023). At MTSU, he had 197 tackles, 3 interceptions, and 14 pass breakups. His senior year had inclusions on the Bronco Nagurski Watch List, Paycom Jim Thorpe Award Watch List, and Senior Bowl Watch List, as well as Honorable Mention All-Conference USA (CUSA) honors. He also received Honorable Mention All-CUSA in 2022 and was named to the Second Team PFF College All-CUSA. Fluellen served as a permanent team captain in 2023.

== Professional career ==
Pre-draft measurables
Height	Weight	Arm length	Hand span	Wingspan	Bench press
6 ft 0 5/8 in (1.84 m)	212 lb (96 kg)	31 in (0.79 m)	9 5/8 in (0.24 m)	6 ft 3 7/8 in (1.93 m)	16 reps
All values from Pro Day

=== New Orleans Saints ===
After going unselected in the 2024 NFL draft, Fluellen signed with the New Orleans Saints as an undrafted free agent. He signed a reserve/future contract with New Orleans on January 6, 2025. On June 20, Fluellen was waived by the Saints.

=== Dallas Renegades ===
On January 13, 2026, Fluellen was selected by the Dallas Renegades in the 2026 UFL Draft.

=== Green Bay Packers ===
On August 11, 2026, Fluellen signed with the Green Bay Packers. He was waived by the Packers on August 29.
