= Raiqwon O'Neal =

American football player (born 2000)

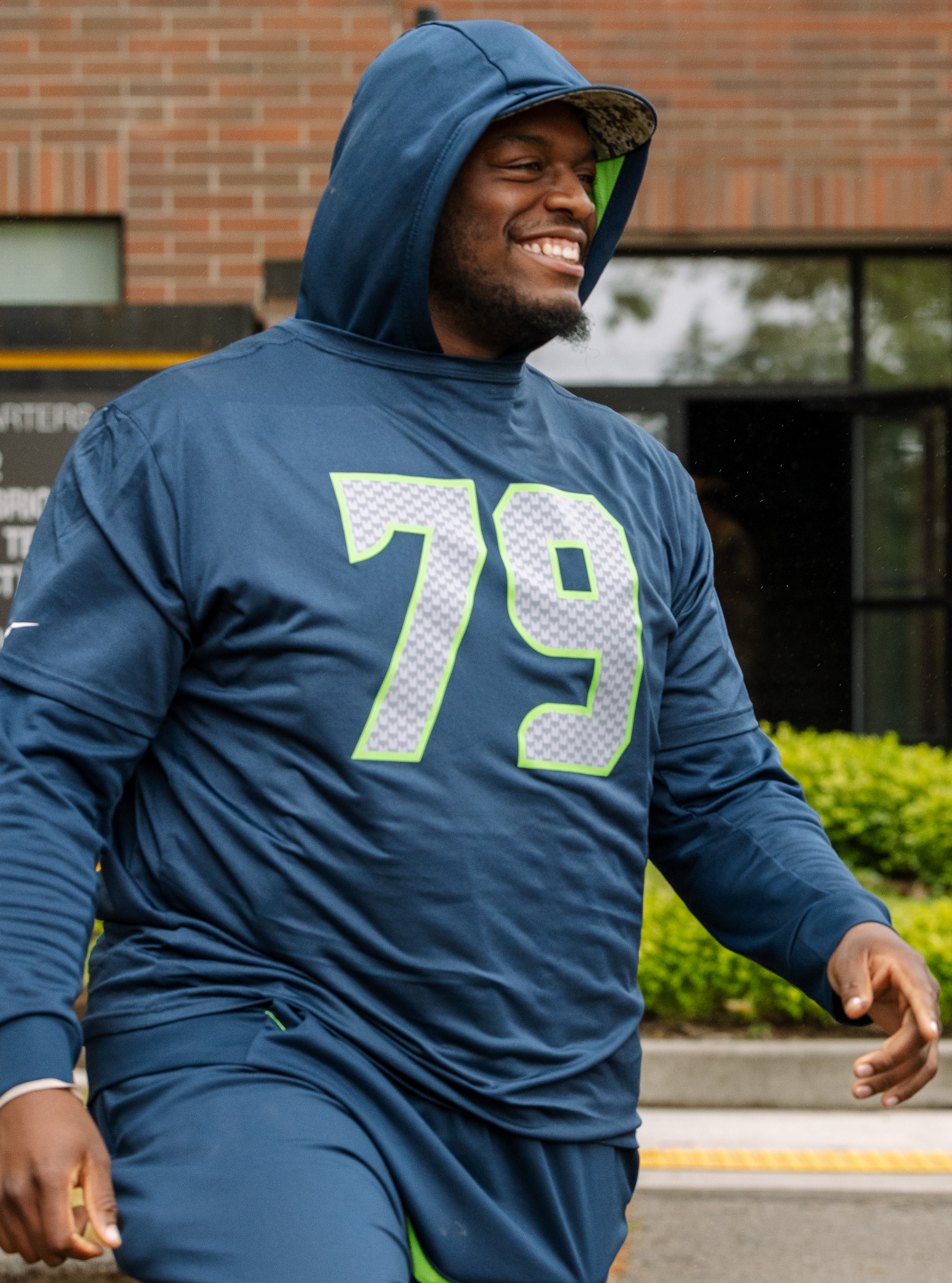
- O'Neal with the Seattle Seahawks in 2024

No. 79 – Colorado Stampede
- Position: Offensive tackle
- Roster status: Active

Personal information
- Born: January 12, 2000 (age 26); Conway, South Carolina, U.S.
- Listed height: 6 ft 3 in (1.91 m)
- Listed weight: 300 lb (136 kg)

Career information
- High school: Conway
- College: Rutgers (2018–2021); UCLA (2022)
- NFL draft: 2023: undrafted

Career history
- Tampa Bay Buccaneers (2023)*; Seattle Seahawks (2023); Tampa Bay Buccaneers (2024)*; Atlanta Falcons (2025)*; Dallas Renegades (2026); Colorado Stampede (2027–present)
- * Offseason or practice squad member only

Career NFL statistics as of 2024
- Games played: 3
- Stats at Pro Football Reference

Raiqwon O'Neal (born January 12, 2000) is an American professional football offensive tackle for the Colorado Stampede of the United Football League (UFL). He first played college football for the Rutgers Scarlet Knights and later transferred to the UCLA Bruins. O'Neal was signed as an undrafted free agent by the Tampa Bay Buccaneers.

== Early life ==
Raiqwon O'Neal was born on January 12, 2000, in Conway, South Carolina to Malik Akram and Dina O'Neal-Akram. O'Neal attended Conway High School, where he played football. He participated in the Shrine Bowl of the Carolinas, a game between the best football players from North Carolina against South Carolina.

== College career ==
O'Neal was rated as the seventeenth-best player from the state of South Carolina before entering college. O'Neal first chose to attend Rutgers University to play college football. As a freshman, O'Neal played in four games. In his next year as a sophomore, O'Neal played in nine games and additionally had four starts. In the shortened 2020 year due to the COVID-19 pandemic, O'Neal started eight games, caught a touchdown pass versus Indiana, and was named an honorable All-Big Ten Conference player. O'Neal would start the most games for Rutgers in the following year, with nine starts in 2021, and again was named an honorable All-Big Ten player. Before the 2022 college football season, O'Neal transferred to UCLA. In his lone year at UCLA, O'Neal started all thirteen games for the Bruins and was a part of an offensive line that was a semifinalist for the Joe Moore Award.

== Professional career ==
Pre-draft measurables
Height	Weight	Arm length	Hand span	Wingspan	40-yard dash	10-yard split	20-yard split	20-yard shuttle	Three-cone drill	Vertical jump	Broad jump	Bench press
6 ft 3 1/2 in (1.92 m)	300 lb (136 kg)	33 7/8 in (0.86 m)	9 1/4 in (0.23 m)	6 ft 10 in (2.08 m)	5.03 s	1.81 s	2.95 s	4.50 s	7.69 s	28.5 in (0.72 m)	8 ft 11 in (2.72 m)	23 reps
All values from Pro Day

=== Tampa Bay Buccaneers (first stint) ===
After going undrafted in the 2023 NFL draft, O'Neal was signed as an undrafted free agent by the Tampa Bay Buccaneers. While O'Neal did not make the active roster before the 2023 NFL regular season, he was signed to the Buccaneers' practice squad after the preseason.

=== Seattle Seahawks ===
On September 13, 2023, O'Neal was signed to the Seattle Seahawks active roster from the Buccaneers practice squad.

On April 8, 2024, O'Neal signed with the Seahawks as a restricted free agent. On August 27, he was released during the 53-man roster cutdown and re-signed to the practice squad, but was released two days later.

=== Tampa Bay Buccaneers (second stint) ===
On September 3, 2024, O'Neal was signed to the Tampa Bay Buccaneers practice squad. He signed a reserve/future contract on January 14, 2025.

On August 26, 2025, O'Neal was waived by the Buccaneers with an injury designation as part of final roster cuts.

=== Atlanta Falcons ===
On October 21, 2025, O'Neal was signed to the Atlanta Falcons' practice squad. He was released on November 11.

=== Dallas Renegades ===
On January 13, 2026, O'Neal was selected by the Dallas Renegades in the 2026 UFL Draft.
