= Alex Akingbulu =

American football player (born 1997)

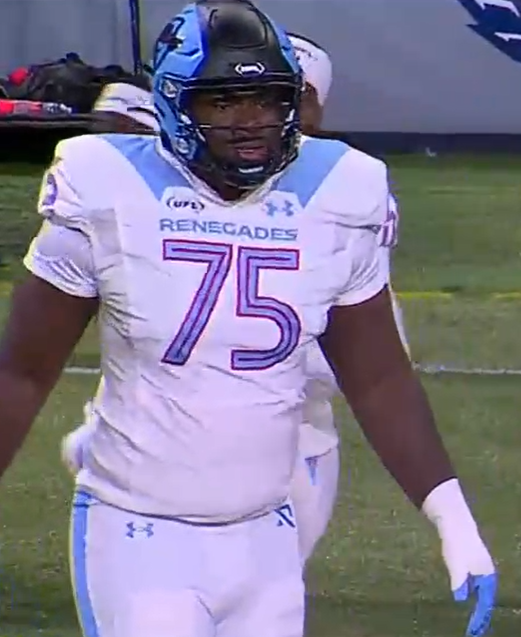
- Akingbulu in 2025

Profile
- Position: Offensive tackle

Personal information
- Born: December 28, 1997 (age 28); Los Angeles, California, U.S.
- Listed height: 6 ft 5 in (1.96 m)
- Listed weight: 300 lb (136 kg)

Career information
- College: UCLA (2016–2017); Fresno State (2018–2021)
- NFL draft: 2022: undrafted

Career history
- Philadelphia Stars (2022); Washington Commanders (2022–2023); Birmingham Stallions (2025)*; Arlington / Dallas Renegades (2025–2026)
- * Offseason or practice squad member only

Career NFL statistics
- Games played: 2
- Stats at Pro Football Reference

Alex Akingbulu (born December 28, 1997) is an American professional football offensive tackle. He played college football for the UCLA Bruins and Fresno State Bulldogs. Akingbulu has also played for the Philadelphia Stars of the United States Football League (USFL).

== Professional career ==
Pre-draft measurables
Height	Weight	Arm length	Hand span	Wingspan	40-yard dash	10-yard split	20-yard split	20-yard shuttle	Three-cone drill	Vertical jump	Broad jump	Bench press
6 ft 5 1/2 in (1.97 m)	310 lb (141 kg)	33 3/8 in (0.85 m)	9 3/4 in (0.25 m)	6 ft 10 1/4 in (2.09 m)	5.29 s	1.81 s	2.99 s	4.94 s	8.13 s	30.0 in (0.76 m)	9 ft 4 in (2.84 m)	24 reps
All values from Pro Day

=== Philadelphia Stars ===
On May 31, 2022, Akingbulu was signed by the Philadelphia Stars of the United States Football League (USFL). Akingbulu played in 5 games at left tackle for the Stars, and lost in the championship game against the Birmingham Stallions, 33–30.

=== Washington Commanders ===
On July 31, 2022, Akingbulu signed with the Washington Commanders. On August 30, Akingbulu was waived by Washington during final roster cuts. He re-signed with the team's practice squad the following day. On January 5, 2023, Akingbulu was promoted to the active roster.

On August 29, 2023, Akingbulu was waived by the Commanders and re-signed to the practice squad. He was signed to the active roster on December 30.

On August 6, 2024, Akingbulu was waived by the Commanders with an injury designation.

=== Birmingham Stallions ===
On December 3, 2024, Akingbulu signed with the Birmingham Stallions of the United Football League (UFL). He was waived on March 20, 2025.

=== Arlington/Dallas Renegades ===
On March 20, 2025, Akingbulu was claimed by the Arlington Renegades of the United Football League (UFL).

On January 13, 2026, Akingbulu was drafted by the Dallas Renegades.

== Personal life ==
Akingbulu graduated with an M.Ed. from Fresno State in 2021, and he is currently pursuing an MBA at the same institution.

Akingbulu is of Nigerian descent. He also created a Nigerian/African-American fusion music trio called "Young Determined Nigerians" (YDN), in which he delivers live performances during the offseason.
