= Sam Tecklenburg =

American football player (born 1997)

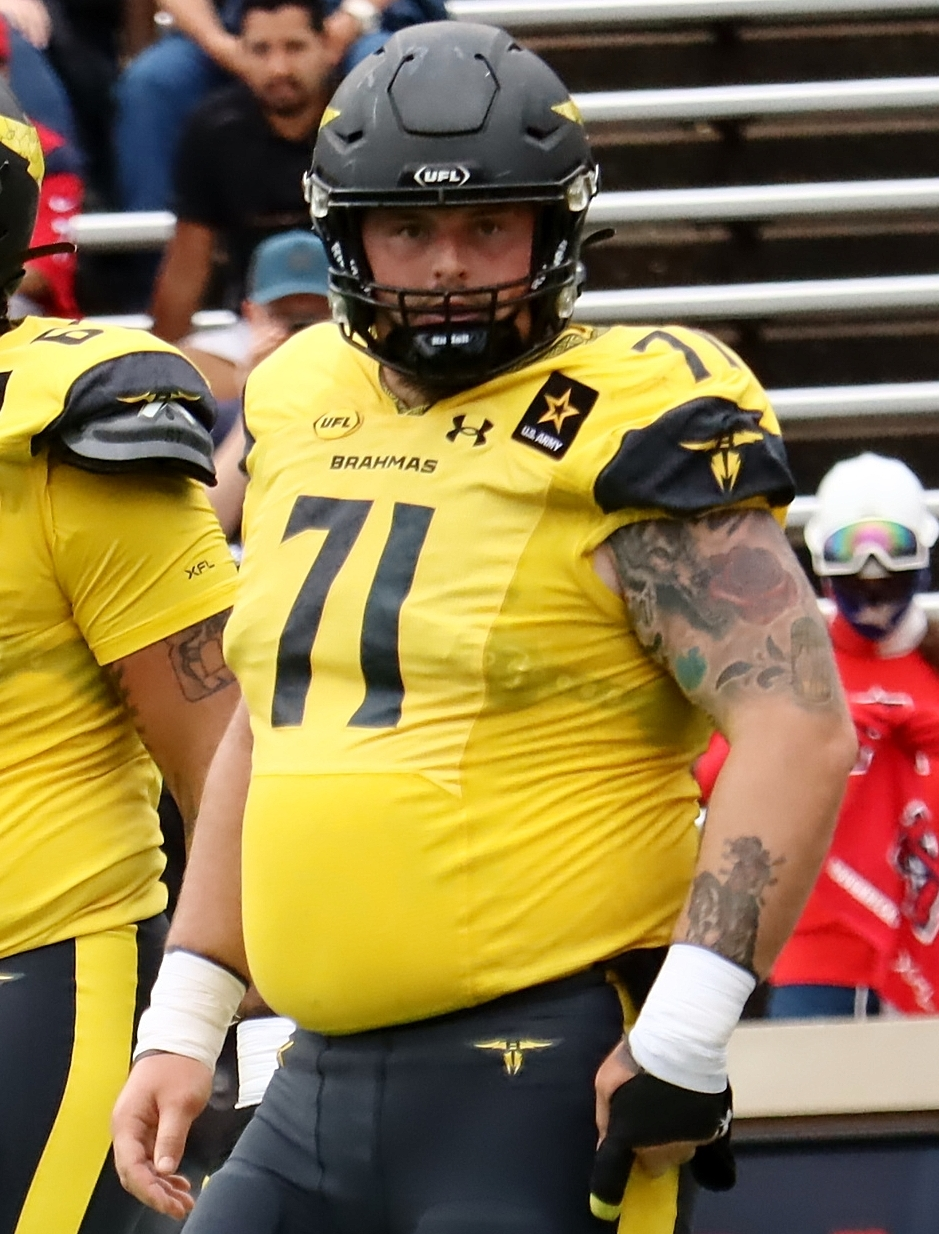
- Tecklenburg with the San Antonio Brahmas in 2024

No. 71
- Position: Center

Personal information
- Born: January 31, 1997 (age 29); Plano, Texas, U.S.
- Listed height: 6 ft 4 in (1.93 m)
- Listed weight: 316 lb (143 kg)

Career information
- High school: Plano (TX)
- College: Baylor (2015–2019)
- NFL draft: 2020: undrafted

Career history
- Carolina Panthers (2020–2022); San Antonio Brahmas (2024–2025); Dallas Renegades (2026)

Career NFL statistics
- Games played: 17
- Games started: 1
- Stats at Pro Football Reference

Sam Tecklenburg (born January 31, 1997) is an American former football center. He played college football at Baylor. He has also played for the Carolina Panthers of the National Football League (NFL).

== Professional career ==
Pre-draft measurables
Height	Weight
6 ft 3 1/4 in (1.91 m)	310 lb (141 kg)
Values from Pro Day

=== Carolina Panthers ===
After playing four years at Baylor, Tecklenburg was signed by the Carolina Panthers as an undrafted free agent on April 27, 2020. Tecklenburg was reunited with Carolina Panthers head coach Matt Rhule, who was also his head coach at Baylor. He was waived during final roster cuts on September 5, and signed to the practice squad the next day. He was promoted to the active roster on October 20, 2020. He was waived on November 5 and re-signed to the practice squad two days later. He signed a reserve/future contract with the Panthers on January 4, 2021.

On August 31, 2021, Tecklenburg was waived by the Panthers and re-signed to the practice squad the next day. He was promoted to the active roster on September 7, 2021.

On August 30, 2022, Tecklenburg was waived by the Panthers and signed to the practice squad the next day. He was promoted to the active roster on January 7, 2023.

On August 29, 2023, Tecklenburg was waived by the Panthers.

=== San Antonio Brahmas ===
On February 28, 2024, Tecklenburg was signed by the San Antonio Brahmas of the United Football League (UFL). He re-signed with the team on September 3, 2024.

=== Dallas Renegades ===
On January 12, 2026, Tecklenburg was allocated to the Dallas Renegades in the UFL regional allocation.

On November 12th, 2026 after not being protected by the Colorado Stampede, Tecklenburg announced via social media that he had retired from football after seven seasons.
