= Andrew Dowell =

American football player (born 1996)

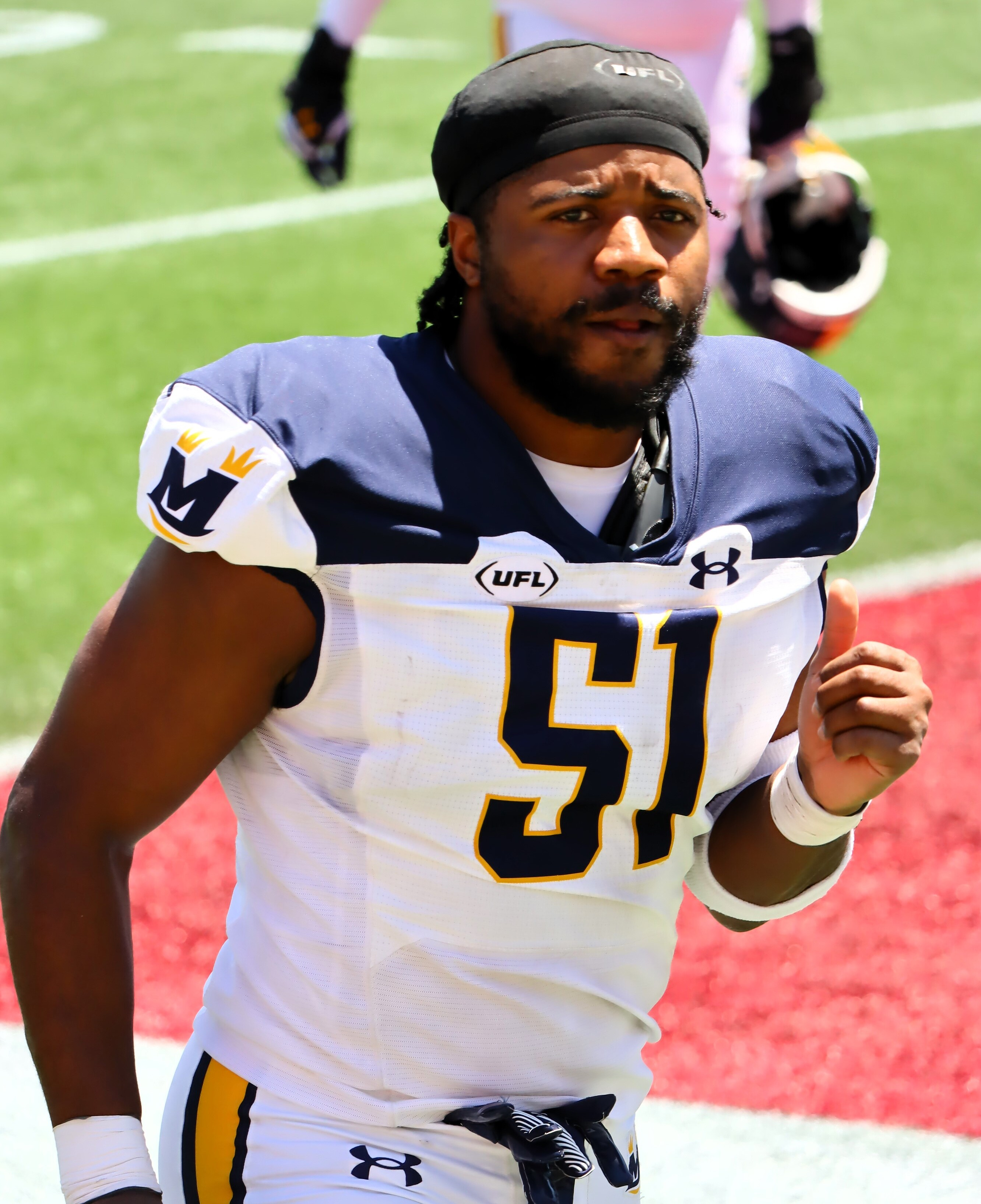
- Dowell with the Memphis Showboats in 2025

Washington Commanders
- Title: Scouting assistant

Personal information
- Born: November 16, 1996 (age 29); Cleveland, Ohio, U.S.
- Listed height: 6 ft 0 in (1.83 m)
- Listed weight: 225 lb (102 kg)

Career information
- High school: St. Edward (Lakewood, Ohio)
- College: Michigan State (2015–2018)
- NFL draft: 2019: undrafted

Career history

Playing
- Dallas Cowboys (2019)*; New Orleans Saints (2019–2023); Memphis Showboats (2025); Dallas Renegades (2026)
- * Offseason or practice squad member only

Operations
- Washington Commanders (2026–present) Scouting assistant

Career NFL statistics as of 2023
- Total tackles: 22
- Forced fumbles: 2
- Stats at Pro Football Reference

Andrew Dowell (born November 16, 1996) is an American former professional football linebacker. He played college football for the Michigan State Spartans and was signed by the Dallas Cowboys as an undrafted free agent in 2019. He has also played for the New Orleans Saints, Memphis Showboats, and Dallas Renegades.

== Early life ==
Dowell attended St. Edward High School. As a junior, he started at running back, collecting 158 carries for 968 yards (6.1-yard avg.), 13 rushing touchdowns, 17 receptions for 246 yards (14.5-yard avg.) and 3 receiving touchdowns.

As a senior, he started at safety and contributed to the team winning the 2014 Division I state championship. He tallied 153 tackles (2 for loss), 6 interceptions (3 returned for touchdowns), 11 passes defensed, 47 carries for 241 yards (5.1-yard avg.), 6 rushing touchdowns, 10 receptions for 148 yards (14.8 avg.) and 3 receiving touchdowns. He received All-Ohio and Cleveland.com All-Star honors.

He also practiced basketball and track.

== College career ==
Dowell accepted a football scholarship from Michigan State University (MSU). As a true freshman, he played 13 games mainly on special teams, leading the team with 10 tackles.

As a sophomore, he made eight-of-12 starts at linebacker, posting 67 tackles and 7 special teams tackles (second on the team).

As a junior, he started all 13 games at linebacker, making 74 tackles (second on the team), 2.5 tackles for loss, one sack, 4 passes defensed, one forced fumble and one fumble recovery.

As a senior, he again started all 13 games at linebacker, making 97 tackles (ranking him 10th in the Big Ten Conference) along with career high tackles for losses (8.5), pass break-ups (9) and sacks (3.5). While at Michigan State, he played alongside his twin-brother David. He earned honorable-mention All-Big Ten honors by coaches and media, and earned the MSU Tommy Love Award for most improved player on defense.

== Professional career ==
Pre-draft measurables
Height	Weight	Arm length	Hand span	Wingspan	40-yard dash	10-yard split	20-yard split	20-yard shuttle	Three-cone drill	Vertical jump	Broad jump	Bench press
5 ft 11 3/4 in (1.82 m)	225 lb (102 kg)	31 7/8 in (0.81 m)	8 3/4 in (0.22 m)	6 ft 7 in (2.01 m)	4.64 s	1.62 s	2.70 s	4.25 s	7.06 s	31.0 in (0.79 m)	9 ft 10 in (3.00 m)	20 reps
All values from Pro Day

=== Dallas Cowboys ===
Dowell was signed as an undrafted free agent by the Dallas Cowboys after the 2019 NFL draft on May 1. He was waived by Dallas, with an injury designation, on August 1, 2019. He was waived from injured reserve on August 10, 2019.

=== New Orleans Saints ===
==== 2019–2020 ====
Dowell signed to the New Orleans Saints' practice squad on November 20, 2019. He signed a reserve/future contract with the Saints on January 7, 2020. He was waived during final roster cuts on September 5, 2020, and signed to the practice squad the next day. He was elevated to the active roster on January 2, 2021, for the team's week 17 game against the Carolina Panthers, and reverted to the practice squad after the game. On January 18, 2021, he signed a reserve/future contract at the conclusion of the 2020 season.

==== 2021 ====
Dowell made the New Orleans Saints' 53-man roster following the 2021 training camp. On September 26, 2021, in week 3, he blocked a punt against the New England Patriots' punter Jake Bailey in the second-quarter. On December 19, 2021, in a week 15 matchup against the Tampa Bay Buccaneers Dowell became the first NFL player in 2021 to record 5 special teams stops (four solo) in a single game. He played in 16 games and finished the 2021 regular season tied for fourth in the league with 15 special teams tackles.

==== 2022 ====
Dowell appeared in all 17 regular season games for the Saints in 2022, racking up two forced fumbles and 7 combined tackles. He did not receive a qualifying offer following the season and became a free agent on March 15, 2023. On April 3, 2023, he re-signed with the Saints.

==== 2023 ====
On August 2, 2023, after sustaining a torn ACL during practice, Dowell was placed on the injured reserve.

==== 2024 ====
On August 23, 2024, Dowell re-signed with the Saints, but was released four days later.

=== Memphis Showboats ===
On April 14, 2025, Dowell signed with the Memphis Showboats of the United Football League (UFL).

=== Dallas Renegades ===
On January 13, 2026, Dowell was selected by the Dallas Renegades in the 2026 UFL Draft.

== Executive career ==
On June 2, 2026, Dowell was hired to serve as a scouting assistant for the Washington Commanders.
