= Keaton Sutherland =

American football player (born 1997)

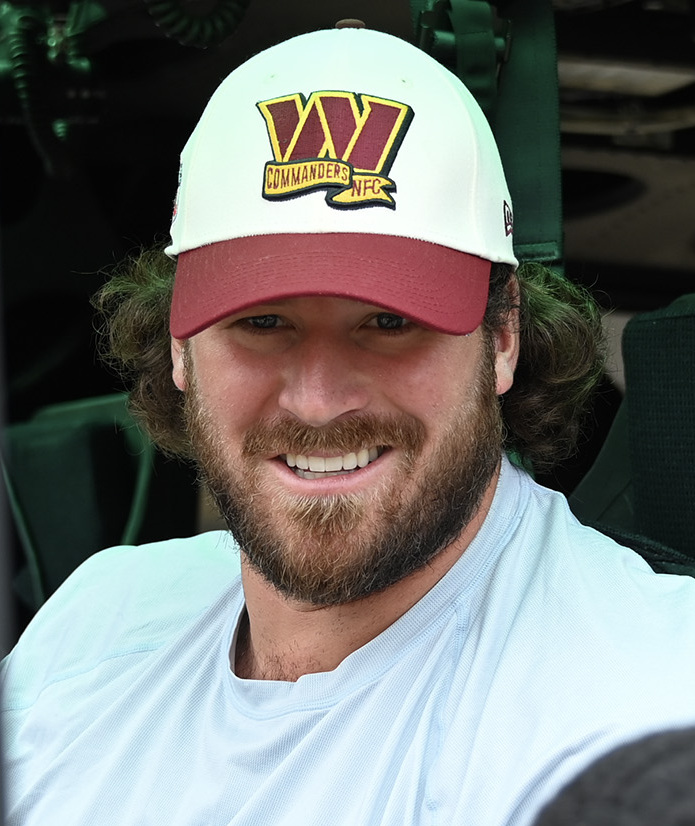
- Sutherland with the Washington Commanders in 2023

No. 74, 75, 64
- Position: Guard

Personal information
- Born: February 12, 1997 (age 29); Flower Mound, Texas, U.S.
- Listed height: 6 ft 5 in (1.96 m)
- Listed weight: 302 lb (137 kg)

Career information
- High school: Edward S. Marcus (Flower Mound)
- College: Texas A&M (2015–2018)
- NFL draft: 2019: undrafted

Career history
- Cincinnati Bengals (2019); Miami Dolphins (2019); Cincinnati Bengals (2020–2021); San Francisco 49ers (2022)*; Washington Commanders (2022)*; Houston Texans (2023)*; Jacksonville Jaguars (2023)*; Birmingham Stallions (2025); Detroit Lions (2025)*; Dallas Renegades (2026)
- * Offseason or practice squad member only

Career NFL statistics as of 2024
- Games played: 6
- Games started: 2
- Stats at Pro Football Reference

Keaton Sutherland (born February 12, 1997) is an American former professional football guard. He played college football for the Texas A&M Aggies and has been a member of several National Football League (NFL) teams.

== College career ==
Sutherland played four seasons for the Texas A&M Aggies and joined the team as an early enrollee. He was named the Aggies starting right guard going into his true freshman season and played in all 13 of the team's games, starting seven of them. Sutherland had surgery to repair an injured shoulder after his freshman season and missed spring practice and lost his starting position.

Sutherland eventually regained his starters spot for the final four games of his sophomore season, playing in eight games total. He started the first six games of his junior year at right tackle before undergoing an appendectomy during the bye week. He did not miss a game and returned to start the rest of the season at left guard.

== Professional career ==
Pre-draft measurables
| Height | Weight | Arm length | Hand span | Wingspan | 40-yard dash | 10-yard split | 20-yard split | 20-yard shuttle | Three-cone drill | Vertical jump | Broad jump | Bench press |
|---|---|---|---|---|---|---|---|---|---|---|---|---|
| 6 ft 5 3/8 in (1.97 m) | 316 lb (143 kg) | 32 3/4 in (0.83 m) | 9 1/2 in (0.24 m) | 6 ft 8 in (2.03 m) | 5.15 s | 1.73 s | 2.92 s | 4.75 s | 8.00 s | 36.0 in (0.91 m) | 9 ft 6 in (2.90 m) | 26 reps |
All values from Pro Day

=== Cincinnati Bengals (first stint) ===
Sutherland signed with the Cincinnati Bengals as an undrafted free agent on April 27, 2019. He was waived at the end of training camp but was re-signed to the team's practice squad on September 1. Sutherland was promoted to the active roster on September 17, and made his NFL debut on September 22, against the Buffalo Bills. He was waived on September 25.

=== Miami Dolphins ===
On September 26, 2019, Sutherland was claimed off waivers by the Miami Dolphins. On September 5, 2020, Sutherland was waived by the Dolphins.

=== Cincinnati Bengals (second stint) ===
On September 8, 2020, Sutherland was signed to the Bengals practice squad. He was promoted to the active roster on September 28. On August 31, 2021, Sutherland was waived by the Bengals and re-signed to the practice squad the next day.

=== San Francisco 49ers ===
On March 8, 2022, Sutherland signed with the San Francisco 49ers. He was waived by the 49ers on August 30, and re-signed to the practice squad the next day. Sutherland was released by San Francisco on September 13.

=== Washington Commanders ===
On October 4, 2022, Sutherland signed with the Washington Commanders' practice squad. He signed a reserve/future contract with Washington on January 9, 2023. Sutherland was released by the Commanders on August 5.

=== Houston Texans ===
Sutherland was claimed off waivers by the Houston Texans on August 6, 2023. He was waived by the Texans on August 29.

=== Jacksonville Jaguars ===
On November 27, 2023, Sutherland was signed to the practice squad of the Jacksonville Jaguars. He signed a reserve/future contract with Jacksonville on January 8, 2024. On August 25, Sutherland was released by the Jaguars.

=== Birmingham Stallions ===
On February 17, 2025, Sutherland was signed by the Birmingham Stallions of the United Football League (UFL). His contract was terminated on August 10, to sign with an NFL team.

=== Detroit Lions ===
On August 10, 2025, Sutherland signed with the Detroit Lions, but was placed on injured reserve four days later. He was subsequently released by the Lions on August 22.

=== Dallas Renegades ===
On January 13, 2026, Sutherland was selected by the Dallas Renegades in the 2026 UFL Draft.
