= 2027 UFL season =

Third season of the United Football League

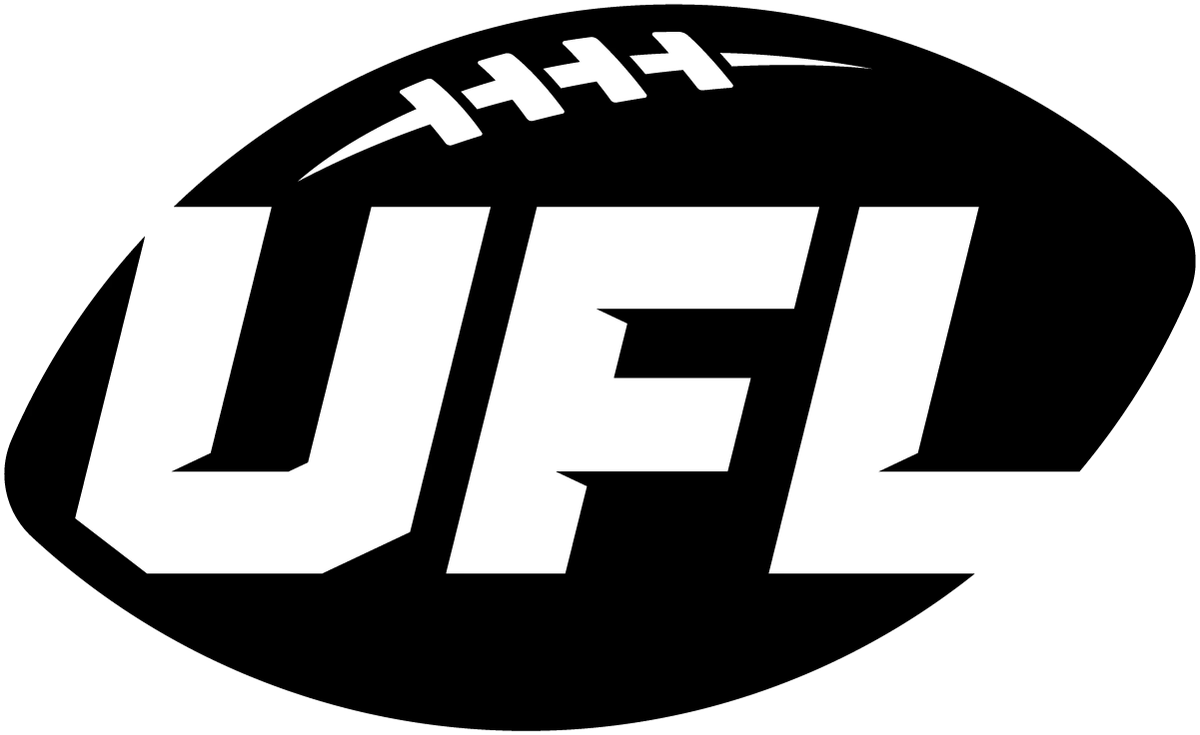
- League: United Football League
- Sport: American football
- Duration: Regular season: March 26 – May 30; Playoffs: June 5/6 – 12/13
- Games: 43 (40 regular season games, 3 postseason games)
- Teams: 8
- TV partner(s): ABC, ESPN, ESPN2, NFL Network, Fox, FS1
- Streaming partner(s): ESPN app, Fox One, DAZN

Draft
- Top draft pick: Diego Pavia
- Picked by: Columbus Aviators

2027 United Bowl

Seasons
- ← 2026 2028 →

The 2027 UFL season will be the fourth season of the United Football League (UFL). The regular season will begin on March 26, 2027, when the defending champion Louisville Kings host the season opener at Lynn Family Stadium.

Ahead of the 2027 season, the UFL relocated the Birmingham Stallions and Houston Gamblers, the last two remaining founding teams of the old United States Football League (USFL) in the UFL, to Pawtucket, Rhode Island, and Colorado Springs, Colorado, respectively. The Stallions rebranded as the Rhode Island Breakers, keeping their roster and head coach A.J. McCarron and playing at Centreville Bank Stadium. The Colorado Stampede, based at Weidner Field, inherited the assets of the Dallas Renegades, while the Renegades took over the Gamblers' roster and coach.

== Offseason ==
Following the 2026 season, league co-owner Mike Repole described his feelings about the season as "happy, but not content." After sparing the Birmingham Stallions from a planned relocation in 2026, he again groused about how the Stallions' longtime home stadium Protective Stadium did not fit his vision of playing in soccer-specific stadiums and that keeping the Stallions in Alabama for 2027 "goes against (...) the biggest principles we’re building this league around."

On July 30, 2026, Repole announced the dissolution of both remaining USFL legacy teams, the Birmingham Stallions and Houston Gamblers. In Houston's case, Repole acknowledged instability (annual stadium changes and the substitution of the successful XFL Roughnecks with the Gamblers) as the key reason for the team's failure; though the team's announcement had not been foreseen, it was met with little surprise, given the team consistently having attendance among the UFL's worst. In Birmingham, a continued stalemate between the city and Repole over the suitability of Protective Stadium, along with Hoover Metropolitan Stadium's rejection of the league, were the primary factors in Repole's decision. Repole had stated that the Stallions would have stayed if not for the stadium situation and that the fan base had otherwise turned out enough to keep the franchise if a smaller stadium were available. (The city of Montgomery offered the UFL use of the Cramton Bowl, which did fit Repole's capacity guidelines, in an effort to keep the Stallions in Alabama, but Repole apparently made no serious consideration of the offer in part because of Montgomery's distance from Birmingham.)

In related news, Repole also stated that the response from potential expansion markets had been stronger than expected, which led him to move the league's expansion timetable up so that in addition to the two replacements for Birmingham and Houston, and the additions of Oklahoma City and the then-undecided tenth team (later revealed as Utah) in 2028, the 11th and 12th franchises could be added as soon as the 2029 season instead of 2030. In early September, Repole stated that the two cities replacing Birmingham and Houston would be unveiled by no later than October 1. On September 17, the league announced that it would again start on the last Friday of March for 2027.

On September 23, 2026, the UFL announced that it would be adding new teams in Colorado Springs, Colorado and Pawtucket, Rhode Island for the 2027 season.

On October 21, 2026, in a surprise announcement, Repole announced that the league was unable to come to an agreement with the Dome at America's Center to host the St. Louis Battlehawks' full home schedule, due to the Dome being unavailable from weeks 5 through 9 of the 2027 season. The Dome cited "a robust calendar of (...) major concerts and conventions" causing the conflict. Repole rejected as unacceptable the distribution of home games that would have resulted: "Sorry, but that just DOESN'T WORK FOR US!!!!" [sic] Energizer Park, which Repole had previously floated as a potential home for the team and fits Repole's vision of playing in soccer-specific stadiums, will also face an unusually large number of conflicts due to Major League Soccer playing a more condensed schedule in 2027 to accommodate its shift to a winter-centered schedule in the autumn. (This complication will also potentially affect the Dallas Renegades, Orlando Storm and DC Defenders, who also share their stadiums with MLS franchises; Orlando had previously used Daytona Stadium as an alternate site in 2026.) Other potential stadiums mentioned in the press include Busch Stadium, the city's baseball park; and Harlen C. Hunter Stadium in St. Charles, which has a much lower capacity than can accommodate most Battlehawks crowds. Both Repole and Dome officials indicated that negotiations were ongoing regarding stadium availability. On November 13, Repole announced that he had come to an agreement for a more favorable distribution of home games that would allow the Battlehawks to play a full five-game home schedule at the Dome.

== Teams ==
=== Relocations and rebrandings ===
==== Returning unchanged ====
- Columbus Aviators
- Dallas Renegades
- DC Defenders
- Louisville Kings
- Orlando Storm
- St. Louis Battlehawks

==== New teams ====
- Colorado Stampede
- Rhode Island Breakers

==== Not returning from 2026 ====
- Birmingham Stallions
- Houston Gamblers

Teams competing in the 2027 UFL season
Team	Location	Stadium	Capacity	Head coach
Colorado Stampede	Colorado Springs, Colorado	Weidner Field	8,000	Rick Neuheisel
Columbus Aviators	Columbus, Ohio	Historic Crew Stadium	19,968	Ted Ginn Jr.
Dallas Renegades	Frisco, Texas	Toyota Stadium	11,000	Kevin Sumlin
DC Defenders	Washington, D.C.	Audi Field	20,000	Shannon Harris
Louisville Kings	Louisville, Kentucky	Lynn Family Stadium	11,700	Chris Redman
Orlando Storm	Orlando, Florida	Inter&Co Stadium	25,500	Anthony Becht
Rhode Island Breakers	Pawtucket, Rhode Island	Centreville Bank Stadium	10,500	A. J. McCarron
St. Louis Battlehawks	St. Louis, Missouri	The Dome at America's Center	67,277	Ricky Proehl

Locations of current teams for the 2027 UFL season.

== Players ==
=== Unionization and compensation ===
The UFL's collective bargaining agreement with the United Football Players Association expired after the 2026 season.

=== Player movement ===
On September 30, 2026, the league announced that the entire Dallas Renegades roster would be vacated and replaced by that of the Houston Gamblers, in a repeat of the situation in 2024, when the XFL's Houston Roughnecks were eliminated and its roster replenished by the Gamblers'. The previous Renegades roster will be reassigned to Colorado, and the Stallions roster to Rhode Island.

==== Free agency ====
Free agency will begin immediately after the 2027 UFL Draft is completed. UFL players who have accrued two years under contract to the same team are anticipated to be allowed to test free agency, after plans for such a proposal prior to the 2026 season were disrupted by Repole's arrival and the league's subsequent realignment.

==== Draft ====
The 2027 UFL Draft took place at 8:00 p.m. Eastern Time on November 18, 2026. For the first time in UFL history, the first two rounds of the draft were televised, with NFL Network carrying live coverage of the event from Ballpark Village in St. Louis, Missouri. The draft reverted to a more traditional entry draft format after the previous draft liquidated and re-dispersed the majority of all eight teams' rosters, which did not occur this time.

Diego Pavia, quarterback from Vanderbilt and Heisman Trophy runner-up from the 2025 season, was selected with the first overall pick in the draft.

== Coaches ==
All eight head coaches from the 2026 season will return in 2027. On September 30, 2026, the UFL announced the allocation of the coaches being displaced by the new franchises:

Coach	Departing team	Incoming team	Notes
Kevin Sumlin	Houston Gamblers	Dallas Renegades	
Rick Neuheisel	Dallas Renegades	Colorado Stampede	
A. J. McCarron	Birmingham Stallions	Rhode Island Breakers	

== Rule changes ==
Repole indicated in September 2026 that he did not have any major rule changes planned for the 2027 season. He mentioned a desire to reduce penalty yardages on certain offensive fouls.

== Season structure ==
=== Regular season ===
After Repole initially "guarantee(d)" that the 2027 season would move to an earlier date, the league announced in September 2026 that the league would again begin its season on the last Friday in March. In a press conference, league president Russ Brandon indicated that the television partners had pushed for the schedule to remain the same and that the league found it easier to schedule dates at their home stadiums in the spring compared to the late winter, but that weather conditions—a key advantage to spring scheduling—did not factor into the decision.

=== Postseason ===
The top four teams in the UFL standings will be seeded in order of record in the league semifinals (1st place team playing 4th place, 2nd versus 3rd), with the winners advancing to the 2027 United Bowl, the league's championship game.

== Season schedule ==
All games stream on ESPN app or Fox One unless otherwise noted.

=== Regular season ===
The following information has been released about the 2027 season as of September 23, 2026:

==== Week 1 ====
Date	Time	Away team	Result	Home team	Stadium	Attendance	Broadcast	Viewership (millions)	Rating	Refs
March 26	8:00 p.m. ET	TBA		Louisville Kings	Lynn Family Stadium		Fox			
March 27	3:00 p.m. ET	TBA		St. Louis Battlehawks	The Dome at America's Center					

==== Week 2 ====
Date	Time	Away team	Result	Home team	Stadium	Attendance	Broadcast	Viewership (millions)	Rating	Refs
April 2	8:00 p.m. ET	TBA		Rhode Island Breakers	Centreville Bank Stadium		Fox			

==== Week 3 ====
Date	Time	Away team	Result	Home team	Stadium	Attendance	Broadcast	Viewership (millions)	Rating	Refs
April 9	8:00 p.m. ET	TBA		TBA	TBA		Fox			
April 11	3:00 p.m. ET	TBA		Colorado Stampede	Weidner Field		ABC			

==== Week 4 ====
Date	Time	Away team	Result	Home team	Stadium	Attendance	Broadcast	Viewership (millions)	Rating	Refs
April 16	8:00 p.m. ET	TBA		TBA	TBA		Fox			

==== Week 5 ====
Date	Time	Away team	Result	Home team	Stadium	Attendance	Broadcast	Viewership (millions)	Rating	Refs
April 23	8:00 p.m. ET	TBA		TBA	TBA		Fox			

==== Week 6 ====
Date	Time	Away team	Result	Home team	Stadium	Attendance	Broadcast	Viewership (millions)	Rating	Refs
April 29	TBA	TBA		Louisville Kings	Lynn Family Stadium		TBA			
April 30	8:00 p.m. ET	TBA		TBA	TBA		Fox			

==== Week 7 ====
Date	Time	Away team	Result	Home team	Stadium	Attendance	Broadcast	Viewership (millions)	Rating	Refs
May 7	8:00 p.m. ET	TBA		TBA	TBA		Fox			

==== Week 8 ====
Date	Time	Away team	Result	Home team	Stadium	Attendance	Broadcast	Viewership (millions)	Rating	Refs
May 14	8:00 p.m. ET	TBA		TBA	TBA		Fox			

==== Week 9 ====
Date	Time	Away team	Result	Home team	Stadium	Attendance	Broadcast	Viewership (millions)	Rating	Refs
May 21	8:00 p.m. ET	TBA		TBA	TBA		Fox			

==== Week 10 ====
Date	Time	Away team	Result	Home team	Stadium	Attendance	Broadcast	Viewership (millions)	Rating	Refs
May 28	8:00 p.m. ET	TBA		TBA	TBA		Fox			

=== Postseason ===
The playoffs will start on June 5 and will end with the United Bowl on June 12.

==== Semifinals ====
Date	Time	Away team	Result	Home team	Stadium	Attendance	Broadcast	Viewership (millions)	Rating	Refs
June 5	TBA	TBA		TBA	TBA		TBA			
June 5	TBA	TBA		TBA	TBA		TBA			

==== 2027 United Bowl ====
Date	Time	Away team	Result	Home team	Stadium	Attendance	Broadcast	Viewership (millions)	Rating	Refs
June 12	TBA	TBA		TBA	TBA		TBA			

== Attendance ==
Announced attendance figures for each home game. In the weekly columns, dashes (—) indicate away games, while bold font indicates the highest attendance of the week.

Team / Week	1	2	3	4	5	6	7	8	9	10	Semifinals	Championship	Total	Average
**Colorado Stampede**	—	—	—	—	—	—	—	—	—	—	—	—	0	**0**
**Columbus Aviators**	—	—	—	—	—	—	—	—	—	—	—	—	0	**0**
**Dallas Renegades**	—	—	—	—	—	—	—	—	—	—	—	—	0	**0**
**DC Defenders**	—	—	—	—	—	—	—	—	—	—	—	—	0	**0**
**Louisville Kings**	—	—	—	—	—	—	—	—	—	—	—	—	0	**0**
**Orlando Storm**	—	—	—	—	—	—	—	—	—	—	—	—	0	**0**
**Rhode Island Breakers**	—	—	—	—	—	—	—	—	—	—	—	—	0	**0**
**St. Louis Battlehawks**	—	—	—	—	—	—	—	—	—	—	—	—	0	**0**
Total	0	0	0	0	0	0	0	0	0	0	0	0	0	
Average	0	0	0	0	0	0	0	0	0	0	0	0		0

=== Personnel ===
- Dany Garcia: Chairperson
- Mike Repole: Director of business operations
- Russ Brandon: President, CEO, and Executive of Football Operations
- Doug Whaley: Senior Vice President of Player Personnel
- Russ Giglio: Senior Director, Player Administration and Officiating Operations
- Jim Popp: Director of Player Administration
- Dr. Damond Blueitt: Medical Director

== Media ==
=== Television ===
In the United States, the television rights for the UFL are held by the ESPN networks (including ABC, ESPN, ESPN2, and NFL Network; FX has been used in the past under this agreement but not since 2023); and league co-owner Fox (which carries games on the Fox network and FS1), along with their respective associated streaming outlets, the ESPN app and Fox One respectively. The ESPN agreement is in the fifth and final year of a pact originally signed with the XFL in 2023.
