= 2017 Detroit Lions season =

NFL team season

- Owner: Martha Firestone Ford
- General manager: Bob Quinn
- Head coach: Jim Caldwell
- Home stadium: Ford Field

Results
- Record: 9–7
- Division place: 2nd NFC North
- Playoffs: Did not qualify
- All-Pros: CB Darius Slay (1st team); KR Jamal Agnew (1st team)
- Pro Bowlers: Darius Slay, CB; T. J. Lang, RG

Uniform
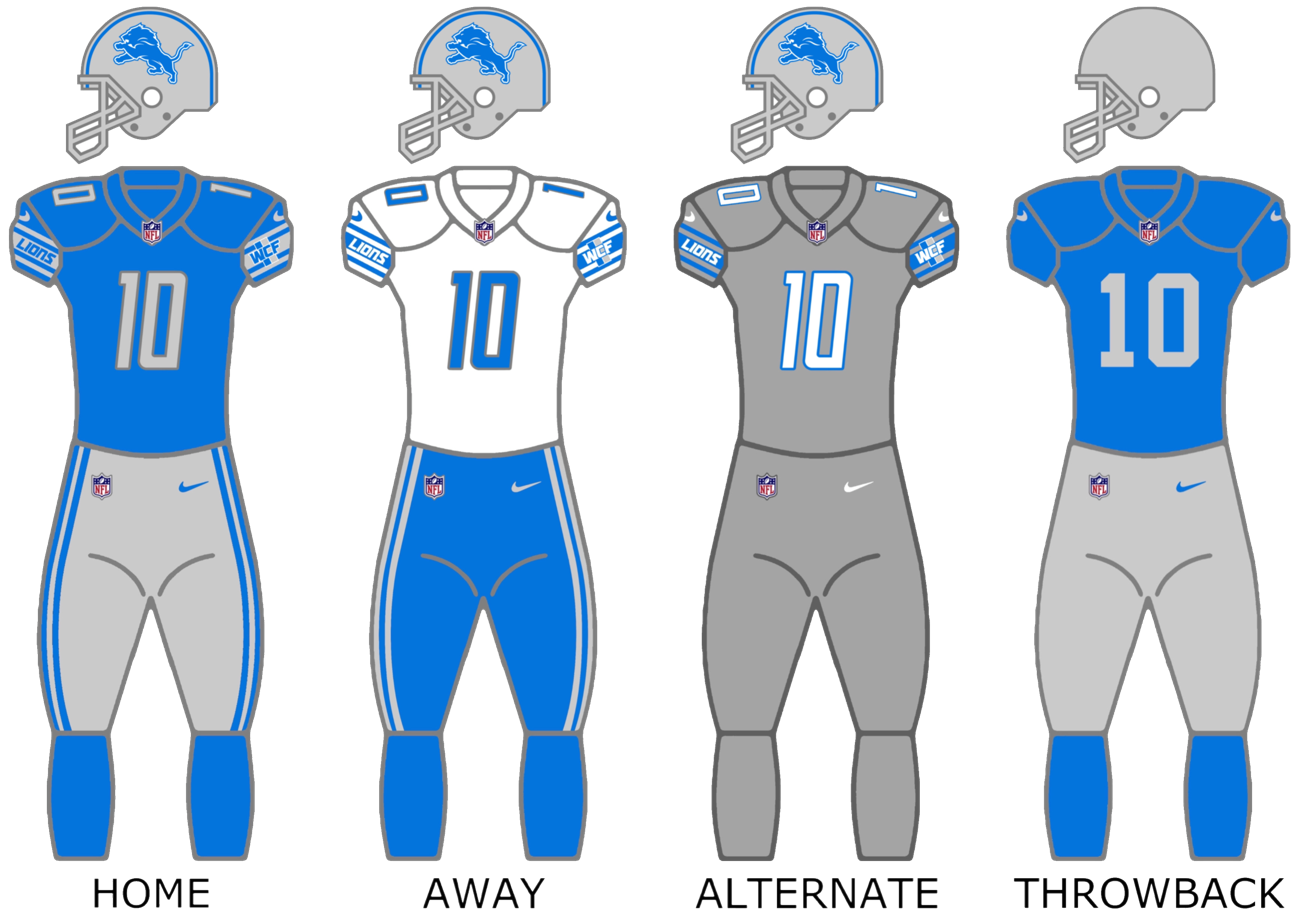

The 2017 season was the Detroit Lions' 88th in the National Football League (NFL), their 84th as the Detroit Lions, and their fourth and final season under head coach Jim Caldwell. The Lions finished with a 9–7 record, the same record they had in 2016, but unlike the previous year, failed to qualify for the playoffs. After starting the season 3–1, they lost 6 of their next 12 games. They were mathematically eliminated from playoff contention in Week 16 following their loss to the Cincinnati Bengals. Despite missing the playoffs, the Lions recorded consecutive winning seasons for the first time since 1994–1995. They also won all of their division road games for the first time ever and swept their division rival Green Bay Packers for the first time since 1991. Despite this, Caldwell was dismissed by the Lions after the season, having accumulating a winning record of 36–28 in four seasons (though was 4–25 against teams that finished with winning records), with two playoff appearances but no playoff wins. The team unveiled a new uniform set and logo, which removed the black that had been used a secondary color since 2003, as well an all-gray Color Rush uniform in week 15.

The Lions would not record another winning season until 2022. It would be the final season they started with a win until 2023. It was also the last season that the Lions finished 2nd in the division until then.

== Offseason ==
=== Coaching staff ===
- On January 4, the Lions announced Jim Caldwell will return as head coach.
- On February 21, the Lions hired George Godsey as defensive assistant/special projects.

=== Re-signings ===
Date	Player	Position	Contract	Source
March 9	Khyri Thornton	Defensive tackle	2 years / $3.3 million	
March 15	Don Muhlbach	Long snapper	1 year / $695,000	
March 21	Armonty Bryant	Defensive end	1 year / $855,000	
April 18	Cornelius Lucas	Offensive tackle	1 year / $1.797 million	
August 9	Tim Wright	Tight end	1 year / $775,000	
August 28	Matthew Stafford	Quarterback	5 years / $135 million	

=== Additions ===
Date	Player	Position	Previous team	Contract	Source
February 9	Rolan Milligan	Safety	Dallas Cowboys	1 year / $465,000	
February 23	Pierce Burton	Offensive tackle	Indianapolis Colts	1 year / $465,000	
March 10	Rick Wagner	Offensive tackle	Baltimore Ravens	5 years / $47.5 million	
March 10	Akeem Spence	Defensive tackle	Tampa Bay Buccaneers	3 years / $9 million	
March 10	Cornelius Washington	Defensive end	Chicago Bears	2 years / $6 million	
March 10	Paul Worrilow	Linebacker	Atlanta Falcons	1 year / $3 million	
March 11	D. J. Hayden	Cornerback	Oakland Raiders	1 year / $3.75 million	
March 11	Darren Fells	Tight end	Arizona Cardinals	1 year / $1.5 million	
March 11	Keshawn Martin	Wide receiver	San Francisco 49ers	1 year / $885,000	
March 12	T. J. Lang	Guard	Green Bay Packers	3 years / $28.5 million	
March 20	Jordan Hill	Defensive tackle	Jacksonville Jaguars	1 year / $855,000	
April 3	Nick Bellore	Linebacker	San Francisco 49ers	1 year / $855,000	
April 25	Kasey Redfern	Punter	Cleveland Browns	1 year / $465,000	
May 12	Brandon Barnes	Tight end	Alabama State	Undrafted FA	
May 12	Alex Barrett	Defensive end	San Diego State	Undrafted FA	
May 12	Dontez Ford	Wide receiver	Pittsburgh	Undrafted FA	
May 12	Tion Green	Running back	Pittsburgh	Undrafted FA	
May 12	Nick James	Defensive tackle	Mississippi State	Undrafted FA	
May 12	Leo Koloamatangi	Offensive lineman	Hawaii	Undrafted FA	
May 12	Desmond Lawrence	Cornerback	North Carolina	Undrafted FA	
May 12	Storm Norton	Tackle	Toledo	Undrafted FA	
May 12	Michael Rector	Wide receiver	Stanford	Undrafted FA	
May 12	Maurice Swain	Defensive tackle	Auburn	Undrafted FA	
May 12	Noel Thomas	Wide receiver	UConn	Undrafted FA	
May 12	Josh Thornton	Cornerback	Southern Utah	Undrafted FA	
May 12	Robert Tonyan	Tight end	Indiana State	Undrafted FA	
May 12	Jeremiah Valoaga	Defensive end	UNLV	Undrafted FA	
May 12	Jamal Agnew	Cornerback	San Diego	4 years / $2.65 million	
May 12	Jarrad Davis	Linebacker	Florida	4 years / $10.9 million	
May 12	Brad Kaaya	Quarterback	Miami	4 years / $2.52 million	
May 12	Jeremiah Ledbetter	Defensive end	Arkansas	4 years / $2.54 million	
May 12	Pat O'Connor	Defensive end	Eastern Michigan	4 years / $2.46 million	
May 12	Jalen Reeves-Maybin	Linebacker	Tennessee	4 years / $3.01 million	
May 12	Michael Roberts	Tight end	Toledo	4 years / $3 million	
May 12	Teez Tabor	Cornerback	Florida	4 years / $4.82 million	
May 15	Arturo Uzdavinis	Tackle	Jacksonville Jaguars	1 year / –	
May 30	Matt Asiata	Running back	Minnesota Vikings	1 year / $615,000	
May 30	Connor Bozick	Guard	Delaware	1 year / –	
June 8	Tony Hills	Tackle	New Orleans Saints	1 year / $910,000	
July 31	Nick Becton	Offensive tackle	Chicago Bears	1 year / $690,000	
August 8	Tramain Jacobs	Cornerback	Toronto Argonauts	1 year / $615,000	
August 8	Dez Stewart	Wide receiver	Pittsburgh Steelers	1 year / $465,000	
August 21	Scott Orndoff	Tight end	Pittsburgh Steelers	1 year / $465,000	
August 27	Derrick Lott	Defensive tackle	Saskatchewan Roughriders	1 year / –	

=== Departures ===
Date	Player	Position	Note	New Team	Source
March 9	DeAndre Levy	Linebacker	Released		
March 9	Riley Reiff	Offensive tackle	UFA	Minnesota Vikings	
March 9	Larry Warford	Guard	UFA	New Orleans Saints	
March 11	Stefan Charles	Defensive tackle	UFA	Jacksonville Jaguars	
March 14	Andre Roberts	Wide receiver	UFA	Atlanta Falcons	
March 23	Tyrunn Walker	Defensive end	UFA	Los Angeles Rams	
March 30	Rafael Bush	Safety	UFA	New Orleans Saints	
April 20	Jon Bostic	Linebacker	UFA	Indianapolis Colts	
May 14	Clay Harbor	Tight end	UFA	New Orleans Saints	
May 24	Devin Taylor	Defensive end	UFA	New York Giants	
June 1	Orson Charles	Tight end	UFA	Kansas City Chiefs	
July 20	Dan Orlovsky	Quarterback	UFA	Los Angeles Rams	
August 5	Josh Bynes	Linebacker	UFA	Arizona Cardinals	
August 7	Anquan Boldin	Wide receiver	UFA	Buffalo Bills	
August 8	Asa Jackson	Cornerback	UFA	San Francisco 49ers	

=== Trades ===
- On June 15, the Lions acquired offensive tackle Greg Robinson from Los Angeles Rams in exchange for a sixth-round draft pick in the 2018 NFL draft.
- On August 31, the Lions traded offensive guard Laken Tomlinson to the San Francisco 49ers for a fifth-round draft pick in the 2019 NFL draft.

=== Draft ===
2017 Detroit Lions Draft
Round	Selection	Player	Position	College	Source
1	21	Jarrad Davis	LB	Florida	
2	53	Teez Tabor	CB	Florida	
3	96	Kenny Golladay	WR	Northern Illinois	
4	124	Jalen Reeves-Maybin	LB	Tennessee	
4	127	Michael Roberts	TE	Toledo	
5	165	Jamal Agnew	CB	San Diego	
6	205	Jeremiah Ledbetter	DE	Arkansas	
6	215	Brad Kaaya	QB	Miami	
7	250	Pat O'Connor	DE	Eastern Michigan	

Notes

- The Lions made two separate trades with the New England Patriots — acquiring an additional sixth-round selection (No. 215 overall) in exchange for linebacker Kyle Van Noy and their original seventh-round selection (No. 239 overall); and acquiring an additional seventh-round selection (No. 250 overall) in exchange for tight end Michael Williams.
- The Lions traded their original third-round selection (No. 85 overall) to the Patriots in exchange for the Patriots' third-round selection (No. 96 overall) and their fourth-round selection (No. 124 overall).

== Staff ==
2017 Detroit Lions staff
Front office: Owner/chairman – Martha Firestone Ford; Vice chairman – William Clay Ford Jr.; President – Rod Wood; Special advisor to the president – Ernie Accorsi; COO – Allison Maki; Executive vice president/general manager – Bob Quinn; Vice president of football administration – Matt Harriss; Chief of staff/assistant to the general manager – Kevin Anderson; Director of player personnel – Kyle O'Brien; Senior Personnel Executive –; Director of college scouting – Lance Newmark; Director of pro scouting – Brendan Prophett; Assistant director of pro personnel – Rob Lohman; Head coaches: Head coach – Jim Caldwell; Assistant head coach/offensive line – Ron Prince; Offensive coaches: Offensive coordinator – Jim Bob Cooter; Quarterbacks – Brian Callahan; Running backs – David Walker; Wide receivers – Robert Prince; Tight ends – Al Golden; Offensive assistant/research & analysis – Evan Rothstein; Quality control/offensive line – Michael McCarthy	Defensive coaches: Defensive coordinator – Teryl Austin; Defensive line – Kris Kocurek; Linebackers – Bill Sheridan; Defensive Backs (Safeties) – Alan Williams; Defensive Backs (Corners) – Tony Oden; Senior coaching assistant – Gunther Cunningham; Defensive assistant/defensive ends – Matt Raich; Defensive assistant/special projects – George Godsey; Defensive quality control – Steven Williams; Special teams coaches: Special teams coordinator – Joe Marciano; Special teams assistant – Devin Fitzsimmons; Strength and Conditioning: Head strength and conditioning – Harold Nash; Assistant strength and conditioning – Josh Schuler

== Final roster ==
2017 Detroit Lions roster
Quarterbacks (QB): 14 Jake Rudock; 9 Matthew Stafford; Running backs (RB): 21 Ameer Abdullah; 38 Tion Green; 25 Theo Riddick; 36 Dwayne Washington; 34 Zach Zenner; Wide receivers (WR): 19 Kenny Golladay; 17 Andy Jones; 11 Marvin Jones; 12 Bradley Marquez; 15 Golden Tate; 16 Jace Billingsley; Tight ends (TE): 85 Eric Ebron; 87 Darren Fells; 80 Michael Roberts; 84 Hakeem Valles	Offensive linemen (OL): 77 Emmett Cleary G; 66 Joe Dahl G; 68 Taylor Decker T; 60 Graham Glasgow G/C; 76 T. J. Lang G; 72 Brian Mihalik T; 70 Corey Robinson T/G; 71 Rick Wagner T; Defensive linemen (DL): 94 Ezekiel Ansah DE; 99 Rodney Coe DT; 93 Dwight Freeney DE; 98 Jeremiah Ledbetter DT; 55 Christian Ringo DT; 91 A'Shawn Robinson DT; 97 Akeem Spence DT; 90 Cornelius Washington DE; 69 Anthony Zettel DE	Linebackers (LB): 43 Nick Bellore MLB; 40 Jarrad Davis MLB; 54 Steve Longa OLB; 44 Jalen Reeves-Maybin OLB; 59 Tahir Whitehead OLB; 58 Paul Worrilow MLB; Defensive backs (DB): 39 Jamal Agnew CB; 26 Don Carey FS; 28 Quandre Diggs; 31 D. J. Hayden CB; 35 Miles Killebrew SS; 24 Nevin Lawson CB; 27 Glover Quin FS; 23 Darius Slay CB; 30 Teez Tabor CB; 45 Charles Washington FS; Special teams (ST): 6 Sam Martin P; 48 Don Muhlbach LS; 5 Matt Prater K	Practice squad: 50 Thurston Armbrister LB; 29 Adairius Barnes CB; 82 Brandon Barnes TE; 79 Alex Barrett DE; 83 Dontez Ford WR (PS/I); 95 Toby Johnson DT; 75 Leo Koloamatangi C; 41 Rolan Milligan SS; 74 Dan Skipper T; 8 Alek Torgersen QB; 78 Jeremiah Valoaga DE; Reserve: 62 Don Barclay G (IR); 53 Brandon Chubb OLB (IR); 51 Brandon Copeland OLB (IR); -- Jordan Hill DT (IR); 61 Kerry Hyder DE (IR); 39 Mike James RB (IR); 13 T. J. Jones WR (IR); 67 Zac Kerin G (IR); 46 Des Lawrence CB (IR); 92 Haloti Ngata DT (IR); 2 Kasey Redfern P (IR); 73 Greg Robinson T (IR); 64 Travis Swanson C (IR); 32 Tavon Wilson SS (IR); Rookies in italics 53 active, 15 reserve, 10 practice squad

== Schedule ==
=== Preseason ===
Week	Date	Opponent	Result	Record	Venue	Recap
1	August 13	at Indianapolis Colts	**W** 24–10	1–0	Lucas Oil Stadium	Recap
2	August 19	New York Jets	**W** 16–6	2–0	Ford Field	Recap
3	August 25	New England Patriots	**L** 28–30	2–1	Ford Field	Recap
4	August 31	at Buffalo Bills	**L** 17–27	2–2	New Era Field	Recap

=== Regular season ===
Week	Date	Opponent	Result	Record	Venue	Recap
1	September 10	Arizona Cardinals	**W** 35–23	1–0	Ford Field	Recap
2	September 18	at New York Giants	**W** 24–10	2–0	MetLife Stadium	Recap
3	September 24	Atlanta Falcons	**L** 26–30	2–1	Ford Field	Recap
4	October 1	at **Minnesota Vikings**	**W** 14–7	3–1	U.S. Bank Stadium	Recap
5	October 8	Carolina Panthers	**L** 24–27	3–2	Ford Field	Recap
6	October 15	at New Orleans Saints	**L** 38–52	3–3	Mercedes-Benz Superdome	Recap
7	Bye					
8	October 29	Pittsburgh Steelers	**L** 15–20	3–4	Ford Field	Recap
9	November 6	at **Green Bay Packers**	**W** 30–17	4–4	Lambeau Field	Recap
10	November 12	Cleveland Browns	**W** 38–24	5–4	Ford Field	Recap
11	November 19	at **Chicago Bears**	**W** 27–24	6–4	Soldier Field	Recap
12	November 23	**Minnesota Vikings**	**L** 23–30	6–5	Ford Field	Recap
13	December 3	at Baltimore Ravens	**L** 20–44	6–6	M&T Bank Stadium	Recap
14	December 10	at Tampa Bay Buccaneers	**W** 24–21	7–6	Raymond James Stadium	Recap
15	December 16	**Chicago Bears**	**W** 20–10	8–6	Ford Field	Recap
16	December 24	at Cincinnati Bengals	**L** 17–26	8–7	Paul Brown Stadium	Recap
17	December 31	**Green Bay Packers**	**W** 35–11	9–7	Ford Field	Recap

Note: Intra-division opponents are in bold text.

=== Game summaries ===
==== Week 1: vs. Arizona Cardinals ====
Week One: Arizona Cardinals at Detroit Lions – Game summary

Quarter	1	2	3	4	Total
Cardinals	10	0	7	6	**23**
**Lions**	0	9	6	20	**35**

at Ford Field, Detroit, Michigan

- Date: September 10
- Game time: 1:00 p.m. EDT
- Game weather: Played indoors (dome stadium)
- Game attendance: 60,957
- Referee: Walt Anderson
- TV announcers (Fox): Chris Myers, Daryl Johnston and Laura Okmin
- Recap, Gamebook

Game information

**First quarter**

- AZ – Justin Bethel 82-yard interception return (Phil Dawson kick). Cardinals 7–0. **Drive: 2 plays, 5 yards, 0:46.**
- AZ – Phil Dawson 24-yard field goal. Cardinals 10–0. **Drive: 7 plays, 7 yards, 3:32.**

**Second quarter**

- DET – Marvin Jones Jr. 6-yard pass from Matthew Stafford. Cardinals 10–6. **Drive: 11 plays, 42 yards, 6:16.**
- DET – Matt Prater 58-yard field goal. Cardinals 10–9. **Drive: 8 plays, 38 yards, 0:39.**

**Third quarter**

- AZ – Kerwynn Williams 3-yard rush (Phil Dawson kick). Cardinals 17–9. **Drive: 12 plays, 94 yards, 5:49.**
- DET – Theo Riddick 7-yard pass from Matthew Stafford. Cardinals 17–15. **Drive: 2 plays, 10 yards, 0:45.**

**Fourth quarter**

- DET – Kenny Golladay 10-yard pass from Matthew Stafford. Lions 21–17. **Drive: 10 plays, 67 yards, 4:49.**
- DET – Kenny Golladay 45-yard pass from Matthew Stafford (Matt Prater kick). Lions 28–17. **Drive: 5 plays, 72 yards, 2:55.**
- DET – Miles Killebrew 35-yard interception return (Matt Prater kick). Lions 35–17. **Drive: 1 play, 0 yards, 0:10.**
- AZ – J. J. Nelson 1-yard pass from Carson Palmer. Lions 35–23. **Drive: 10 plays, 75 yards, 2:30.**

**Top passers**

- ARI – Carson Palmer – 27/48, 269 yards, TD, 3 INT
- DET – Matthew Stafford – 29/41, 292 yards, 4 TD, INT

**Top rushers**

- ARI – David Johnson – 11 carries, 23 yards
- DET – Ameer Abdullah – 15 carries, 30 yards

**Top receivers**

- ARI – Larry Fitzgerald – 6 receptions, 74 yards
- DET – Golden Tate – 10 receptions, 107 yards

**Top tacklers**

- ARI – Tyvon Branch – 10 tackles, 1 assist
- DET – Jarrad Davis – 9 tackles

To open the regular season, the Lions hosted the Arizona Cardinals. The Cardinals took an early lead in the first quarter with an 82-yard interception return from Justin Bethel, followed by a 24-yard field goal from Phil Dawson. The Lions got on the board in the second quarter with a six-yard touchdown pass from Matthew Stafford to Marvin Jones Jr., and a 58-yard field goal from Matt Prater to make the score 10–9 in favor of Arizona at half-time. In the third quarter, the Cardinals added to their lead with a three-yard touchdown run from Kerwynn Williams, but the Lions responded with a seven-yard touchdown pass from Stafford to Theo Riddick. In the final quarter, the Lions took their first lead with a 10-yard touchdown pass from Stafford to Kenny Golladay. Stafford connected with Golladay again minutes later with a 45-yard touchdown pass, then Miles Killebrew returned an interception 35 yards for the Lions' final points. The Cardinals scored with a one-yard touchdown pass from Carson Palmer to J. J. Nelson, making the final score 35–23 in favor of Detroit. It was Matthew Stafford's 27th fourth quarter or overtime comeback since 2011, the most in the league.

==== Week 2: at New York Giants ====
Week Two: Detroit Lions at New York Giants – Game summary

Quarter	1	2	3	4	Total
**Lions**	7	10	0	7	**24**
Giants	0	7	3	0	**10**

at MetLife Stadium, East Rutherford, New Jersey

- Date: September 18
- Game time: 8:30 p.m. EDT
- Game weather: 72 °F (22 °C), Cloudy
- Game attendance: 77,004
- Referee: John Parry
- TV announcers (ESPN): Sean McDonough, Jon Gruden and Lisa Salters
- Recap, Gamebook

Game information

**First quarter**

- DET – Marvin Jones Jr. 27-yard pass from Matthew Stafford (Matt Prater kick). Lions 7–0. **Drive: 9 plays, 54 yards, 5:43.**

**Second quarter**

- NYG – Evan Engram 18-yard pass from Eli Manning (Aldrick Rosas kick). Tied 7–7. **Drive: 8 plays, 75 yards, 4:05.**
- DET – Eric Ebron 7-yard pass from Matthew Stafford (Matt Prater kick). Lions 14–7. **Drive: 5 plays, 29 yards, 2:52.**
- DET – Matt Prater 56-yard field goal. Lions 17–7. **Drive: 6 plays, 37 yards, 2:29.**

**Third quarter**

- NYG – Aldrick Rosas 25-yard field goal. Lions 17–10. **Drive: 10 plays, 68 yards, 5:45.**

**Fourth quarter**

- DET – Jamal Agnew 88-yard punt return (Matt Prater kick). Lions 24–10. **Drive: 3 plays, 9 yards, 1:45.**

**Top passers**

- DET – Matthew Stafford – 15/21, 122 yards, 2 TD
- NYG – Eli Manning – 22/32, 239 yards, TD, INT

**Top rushers**

- DET – Ameer Abdullah – 17 carries, 86 yards
- NYG – Shane Vereen – 6 carries, 28 yards

**Top receivers**

- DET – Eric Ebron – 5 receptions, 42 yards, TD
- NYG – Evan Engram – 4 receptions, 49 yards, TD

**Top tacklers**

- DET – Darius Slay – 6 tackles, 2 assists
- NYG – Dominique Rodgers-Cromartie – 8 tackles, 3 assists

In week 2, the Lions visited the New York Giants to play on Monday Night Football. The Lions took an early lead in the first quarter with a 27-yard touchdown pass from Matthew Stafford to Marvin Jones. The Giants tied the game in the second quarter with an 18-yard touchdown pass from Eli Manning to Evan Engram, but the Lions took the lead back (which they kept for the rest of the game) with a seven-yard touchdown pass from Stafford to Eric Ebron, and a 56-yard field goal by Matt Prater to make the score 17–7 in favor of Detroit at half-time. Each team only scored once in the second half: first the Giants with a 25-yard field goal by Aldrick Rosas in the third quarter, then the Lions with an 88-yard punt return by Jamal Agnew in the fourth quarter, making the final score 24–10 for the Lions' second consecutive win. The Lions started the season 2–0 for the first time since 2011, and won both games by double digits for the first time since 1980. Stafford threw his 193rd touchdown, passing Bob Griese for the 48th spot on the all-time list.

==== Week 3: vs. Atlanta Falcons ====
Week Three: Atlanta Falcons at Detroit Lions – Game summary

Quarter	1	2	3	4	Total
**Falcons**	7	13	3	7	**30**
Lions	0	13	10	3	**26**

at Ford Field, Detroit, Michigan

- Date: September 24
- Game time: 1:00 p.m. EDT
- Game weather: Played indoors (dome stadium)
- Game attendance: 63,240
- Referee: Walt Coleman
- TV announcers (Fox): Chris Myers, Daryl Johnston and Laura Okmin
- Recap, Gamebook

Game information

**First quarter**

- ATL – Mohamed Sanu 4-yard pass from Matt Ryan (Matt Bryant kick). Falcons 7–0. **Drive: 12 plays, 75 yards, 6:43.**

**Second quarter**

- ATL – Matt Bryant 36-yard field goal. Falcons 10–0. **Drive: 10 plays, 53 yards, 5:36.**
- DET – Matt Prater 55-yard field goal. Falcons 10–3. **Drive: 6 plays, 38 yards, 2:24.**
- ATL – Devonta Freeman 1-yard run (Matt Bryant kick). Falcons 17–3. **Drive: 9 plays, 64 yards, 5:27.**
- DET – Matt Prater 40-yard field goal. Falcons 17–6. **Drive: 9 plays, 53 yards, 3:10.**
- DET – Glover Quin 37-yard interception return (Matt Prater kick). Falcons 17–13. **Drive: 1 play, 0 yards, 0:09.**
- ATL – Matt Bryant 48-yard field goal. Falcons 20–13. **Drive: 7 plays, 45 yards, 1:10.**

**Third quarter**

- ATL – Matt Bryant 40-yard field goal. Falcons 23–13. **Drive: 5 plays, 19 yards, 1:55.**
- DET – Golden Tate 11-yard pass from Matthew Stafford (Matt Prater kick). Falcons 23–20. **Drive: 12 plays, 75 yards, 6:46.**
- DET – Matt Prater 35-yard field goal. Tied 23–23. **Drive: 4 plays, 4 yards, 1:20.**

**Fourth quarter**

- ATL – Taylor Gabriel 40-yard pass from Matt Ryan (Matt Bryant kick). Falcons 30–23. **Drive: 4 plays, 75 yards, 1:34.**
- DET – Matt Prater 57-yard field goal. Falcons 30–26. **Drive: 8 plays, 37 yards, 3:02.**

**Top passers**

- ATL – Matt Ryan – 24/35, 294 yards, 2 TD, 3 INT
- DET – Matthew Stafford – 25/45, 264 yards, TD

**Top rushers**

- ATL – Devonta Freeman – 21 carries, 106 yards, TD
- DET – Ameer Abdullah – 14 carries, 47 yards.

**Top receivers**

- ATL – Julio Jones – 7 receptions, 91 yards
- DET – T. J. Jones – 3 receptions, 63 yards

**Top tacklers**

- ATL – Brian Poole – 6 tackles, 2 assists
- DET – Miles Killebrew – 8 tackles, 1 assist

In week 3, the Lions hosted the Atlanta Falcons. The Falcons took an early lead in the first quarter with a four-yard touchdown pass from Matt Ryan to Mohamed Sanu. The Falcons scored 13 points in the second quarter via a 36-yard field goal from Matt Bryant, a one-yard touchdown run from Devonta Freeman, and a 48-yard field goal from Bryant. The Lions also scored 13 points in the second quarter via a 55-yard field goal from Matt Prater, a 40-yard field goal from Prater, and a 37-yard interception return from Glover Quin, to make the score 20–13 in favor of Atlanta at half-time. The Falcons extended their lead in the third quarter via a 40-yard field goal from Bryant. The Lions responded with an 11-yard touchdown pass from Matthew Stafford to Golden Tate, and a 35-yard field goal from Prater to tie the game at 23. The Falcons regained the lead in the fourth quarter via a 40-yard touchdown pass from Ryan to Taylor Gabriel. The Lions reduced the Falcons lead to four points with a 57-yard field goal from Prater. The Lions' attempted comeback failed when a touchdown pass from Stafford to Tate was overturned with eight seconds remaining in the game. Due to Tate being ruled down in the field of play and the Lions having no timeouts left, the ten-second runoff rule was invoked, ending the game and giving the Lions their first loss of the season.

==== Week 4: at Minnesota Vikings ====
Week Four: Detroit Lions at Minnesota Vikings – Game summary

Quarter	1	2	3	4	Total
**Lions**	0	3	11	0	**14**
Vikings	0	7	0	0	**7**

at U.S. Bank Stadium, Minneapolis, Minnesota

- Date: October 1
- Game time: 1:00 p.m. EDT/12:00 p.m. CDT
- Game weather: Played indoors (dome stadium)
- Game attendance: 66,730
- Referee: Bill Vinovich
- TV announcers (Fox): Thom Brennaman, Chris Spielman and Peter Schrager
- Recap, Gamebook

Game information

**First quarter**

- No scoring

**Second quarter**

- DET – Matt Prater 29-yard field goal. Lions 3–0. **Drive: 15 plays, 82 yards, 8:02.**
- MIN – Dalvin Cook 5-yard run (Kai Forbath kick). Vikings 7–3. **Drive: 11 plays, 81 yards, 4:33.**

**Third quarter**

- DET – Matt Prater 37-yard field goal. Vikings 7–6. **Drive: 8 plays, 29 yards, 3:37.**
- DET – Ameer Abdullah 3-yard run. Matthew Stafford pass to T. J. Jones is complete for 2-point conversion. Lions 14–7. **Drive: 5 plays, 29 yards, 2:25.**

**Fourth quarter**

- No scoring

**Top passers**

- DET – Matthew Stafford – 19/31, 209 yards
- MIN – Case Keenum – 16/30, 219 yards

**Top rushers**

- DET – Ameer Abdullah – 20 carries, 94 yards, TD
- MIN – Dalvin Cook – 13 carries, 66 yards, TD

**Top receivers**

- DET – Marvin Jones Jr. – 2 receptions, 42 yards
- MIN – Stefon Diggs – 5 carries, 98 yards

**Top tacklers**

- DET – Tahir Whitehead – 5 tackles
- MIN – Andrew Sendejo – 5 tackles, 6 assists

In week 4, the Lions visited their divisional rival, the Minnesota Vikings. After a scoreless first quarter, the Lions got on the board with a 29-yard field goal by Matt Prater. The Vikings responded a few minutes later with a five-yard rushing touchdown by Dalvin Cook to make the score 7–3 in favor of Minnesota at half-time. The Lions scored 11 unanswered points in the second half. First, Prater kicked a 37-yard field goal to cut the Vikings' lead to three in the third quarter. Next, Detroit regained the lead with a three-yard rushing touchdown by Ameer Abdullah, followed by a two-point conversion pass from Matthew Stafford to T. J. Jones. Both third quarter scores followed Vikings fumbles that were recovered by the Lions. Detroit's Glover Quin forced another fumble by Adam Thielen with under two minutes left in the game, which was recovered by Tahir Whitehead to end Minnesota's attempt at a possible game-tying drive.

==== Week 5: vs. Carolina Panthers ====
Week Five: Carolina Panthers at Detroit Lions – Game summary

Quarter	1	2	3	4	Total
**Panthers**	3	14	10	0	**27**
Lions	3	7	0	14	**24**

at Ford Field, Detroit, Michigan

- Date: October 8
- Game time: 1:00 p.m. EDT
- Game weather: Played indoors (dome stadium)
- Game attendance: 64,288
- Referee: Craig Wrolstad
- TV announcers (Fox): Kenny Albert, Charles Davis and Pam Oliver
- Recap, Gamebook

Game information

**First quarter**

- DET – Matt Prater 30-yard field goal. Lions 3–0. **Drive: 8 plays, 63 yards, 3:28.**
- CAR – Graham Gano 21-yard field goal. Tied 3–3. **Drive: 6 plays, 61 yards, 3:01.**

**Second quarter**

- DET – Zach Zenner 1-yard run (Matt Prater kick). Lions 10–3. **Drive: 9 plays, 78 yards, 5:19.**
- CAR – Christian McCaffrey 6-yard pass from Cam Newton (Graham Gano kick). Tied 10–10. **Drive: 5 plays, 75 yards, 2:28.**
- CAR – Devin Funchess 10-yard pass from Cam Newton (Graham Gano kick). Panthers 17–10. **Drive: 11 plays, 73 yards, 4:10.**

**Third quarter**

- CAR – Kelvin Benjamin 31-yard pass from Cam Newton (Graham Gano kick). Panthers 24–10. **Drive: 8 plays, 75 yards, 4:17.**
- CAR – Graham Gano 44-yard field goal. Panthers 27–10. **Drive: 4 plays, 3 yards, 1:09.**

**Fourth quarter**

- DET – Darren Fells 4-yard pass from Matthew Stafford (Matt Prater kick). Panthers 27–17. **Drive: 8 plays, 69 yards, 3:10.**
- DET – Darren Fells 20-yard pass from Matthew Stafford (Matt Prater kick). Panthers 27–24. **Drive: 6 plays, 53 yards, 0:51.**

**Top passers**

- CAR – Cam Newton – 26/33, 355 yards, 3 TD
- DET – Matthew Stafford – 23/35, 229 yards, 2 TD

**Top rushers**

- CAR – Jonathan Stewart – 18 carries, 21 yards
- DET – Ameer Abdullah – 10 carries, 31 yards

**Top receivers**

- CAR – Ed Dickson – 5 receptions, 175 yards
- DET – Marvin Jones Jr. – 6 receptions, 54 yards

**Top tacklers**

- CAR – Luke Kuechly – 5 tackles, 3 assists
- DET – Tavon Wilson – 9 tackles, 1 assist

In week 5, the Lions hosted the Carolina Panthers. The teams exchanged field goals in the first quarter, one from Matt Prater from 30-yards, and one from Graham Gano from 21-yards. The Lions regained the lead in the second quarter via a one-yard touchdown run from Zach Zenner. The Panthers responded with a six-yard touchdown pass from Cam Newton to Christian McCaffrey, and a 10-yard touchdown pass from Newtwon to Devin Funchess, to make the score 17–10 in favor of Carolina at half-time. The Panthers scored 10 points in the third quarter via a 31-yard touchdown pass from Newton to Kelvin Benjamin, and a 44-yard field from Gano. The Lions responded with 14 points in the fourth quarter via two touchdown receptions from Matthew Stafford to Darren Fells, from four-yards and 20-yards respectively, making the final score 27–24 in favor of Carolina. Detroit's loss dropped them to 2nd in the NFC North, as the Packers beat the Cowboys later in the day to move to 4–1.

==== Week 6: at New Orleans Saints ====
Week Six: Detroit Lions at New Orleans Saints – Game summary

Quarter	1	2	3	4	Total
Lions	7	3	14	14	**38**
**Saints**	17	14	14	7	**52**

at Mercedes-Benz Superdome, New Orleans, Louisiana

- Date: October 15
- Game time: 1:00 p.m. EDT/12:00 p.m. CDT
- Game weather: Played indoors (dome stadium)
- Game attendance: 73,117
- Referee: Jeff Triplette
- TV announcers (Fox): Dan Hellie, Chris Spielman and Peter Schrager
- Recap, Gamebook

Game information

**First quarter**

- NO – Kenny Vaccaro fumble recovery in end zone (Wil Lutz kick). Saints 7–0. **Drive: 3 plays, -2 yards, 0:54.**
- DET – Golden Tate 45-yard pass from Matthew Stafford (Matt Prater kick). Tied 7–7. **Drive: 7 plays, 75 yards, 4:00.**
- NO – Ted Ginn Jr. 20-yard pass from Drew Brees (Wil Lutz kick). Saints 14–7. **Drive: 4 plays, 75 yards, 2:06.**
- NO – Wil Lutz 41-yard field goal. Saints 21–7. **Drive: 9 plays, 69 yards, 3:50.**

**Second quarter**

- NO – Mark Ingram II 1-yard run (Wil Lutz kick). Saints 24–7. **Drive: 6 plays, 31 yards, 2:55.**
- DET – Matt Prater 41-yard field goal. Saints 24–10. **Drive: 8 plays, 53 yards, 4:08.**
- NO – Mark Ingram II 2-yard run (Wil Lutz kick). Saints 31–10. **Drive: 11 plays, 75 yards, 4:50.**

**Third quarter**

- NO – Michael Hoomanawanui 2-yard pass from Drew Brees (Wil Lutz kick). Saints 38–10. **Drive: 7 plays, 54 yards, 3:18.**
- NO – Marshon Lattimore 27-yard interception return (Wil Lutz kick). Saints 45–10. **Drive: 2 plays, 2 yards, 0:43.**
- DET – Marvin Jones Jr. 22-yard pass from Matthew Stafford (Matt Prater kick). Saints 45–17. **Drive: 6 plays, 75 yards, 2:38.**
- DET – Darren Fells 22-yard pass from Matthew Stafford (Matt Prater kick). Saints 45–24. **Drive: 11 plays, 61 yards, 3:16.**

**Fourth quarter**

- DET – Jamal Agnew 74-yard punt return (Matt Prater kick). Saints 45–31. **Drive: 4 plays, 7 yards, 2:45.**
- DET – A'Shawn Robinson 2-yard interception return (Matt Prater kick). Saints 45–38. **Drive: 2 plays, -4 yards, 0:48.**
- NO – Cameron Jordan interception in end zone (Wil Lutz kick). Saints 52–38. **Drive: 2 plays, 0 yards, 0:07.**

**Top passers**

- DET – Matthew Stafford – 25/52, 312 yards, 3 TD, 3 INT
- NO – Drew Brees – 21/31, 186 yards, 2 TD, 2 INT

**Top rushers**

- DET – Ameer Abdullah – 14 carries, 54 yards
- NO – Mark Ingram II – 25 carries, 114 yards, 2 TD

**Top receivers**

- DET – Marvin Jones – 6 receptions, 96 yards, TD
  Golden Tate – 7 receptions, 96 yards, TD
- NO – Ted Ginn Jr. – 4 receptions, 66 yards, TD

**Top tacklers**

- DET – Jarrad Davis – 6 tackles, 2 assists
- NO – Marcus Williams – 5 tackles, 1 assist

In week 6, the Lions visited the New Orleans Saints. The Saints opened the scoring in the first quarter via a fumble recovery in the end zone by Kenny Vaccaro. The Lions responded with a 45-yard touchdown pass from Matthew Stafford to Golden Tate to tie the game. The Saints regained the lead via a 20-yard touchdown pass from Drew Brees to Ted Ginn Jr. and a 41-yard field goal from Wil Lutz. The Saints scored 14 points in the second quarter via two touchdown runs from Mark Ingram II from one and two-yards respectively. Matt Prater recorded a 41-yard field goal to make the score 31–10 in favor of New Orleans at half-time. The Saints scored 14 points in the third quarter via a two-yard touchdown pass from Brees to Michael Hoomanawanui and a 27-yard interception return from Marshon Lattimore. The Lions responded with 28 straight points in the second half. The Lions scored 14 points in the third quarter via a 22-yard touchdown pass from Stafford to Marvin Jones Jr. and a 22-yard touchdown pass from Stafford to Darren Fells. The Lions scored 14 points in the fourth quarter via a 74-yard punt return from Jamal Agnew and a two-yard interception return from A'Shawn Robinson, reducing the Saints' lead to seven points. The Lions' attempted comeback failed when Stafford's pass intended for Eric Ebron was intercepted in the end zone by Cameron Jordan, making the final score 52–38 in favor of New Orleans.

==== Week 8: vs. Pittsburgh Steelers ====
Week Eight: Pittsburgh Steelers at Detroit Lions – Game summary

Quarter	1	2	3	4	Total
**Steelers**	3	7	10	0	**20**
Lions	3	9	0	3	**15**

at Ford Field, Detroit, Michigan

- Date: October 29
- Game time: 8:30 p.m. EDT
- Game weather: Played indoors (dome stadium)
- Game attendance: 64,983
- Referee: John Hussey
- TV announcers (NBC): Al Michaels, Cris Collinsworth and Michele Tafoya
- Recap, Gamebook

Game information

**First quarter**

- PIT – Chris Boswell 34-yard field goal. Steelers 3–0. **Drive: 7 plays, 59 yards, 2:48.**
- DET – Matt Prater 48-yard field goal. Tied 3–3. **Drive: 8 plays, 45 yards, 4:22.**

**Second quarter**

- DET – Matt Prater 37-yard field goal. Lions 6–3. **Drive: 8 plays, 39 yards, 3:33.**
- PIT – Le'Veon Bell 5-yard run (Chris Boswell kick). Steelers 10–6. **Drive: 9 plays, 75 yards, 5:01.**
- DET – Matt Prater 51-yard field goal. Steelers 10–9. **Drive: 6 plays, 42 yards, 1:56.**
- DET – Matt Prater 34-yard field goal. Lions 12–10. **Drive: 8 plays, 63 yards, 0:43.**

**Third quarter**

- PIT – Chris Boswell 38-yard field goal. Steelers 13–12. **Drive: 9 plays, 28 yards, 4:08.**
- PIT – JuJu Smith-Schuster 97-yard pass from Ben Roethlisberger (Chris Boswell kick). Steelers 20–12. **Drive: 3 plays, 98 yards, 1:24.**

**Fourth quarter**

- DET – Matt Prater 19-yard field goal. Steelers 20–15. **Drive: 10 plays, 74 yards, 5:07.**

**Top passers**

- PIT – Ben Roethlisberger – 17/31, 317 yards, TD, INT
- DET – Matthew Stafford – 27/45, 423 yards

**Top rushers**

- PIT – Le'Veon Bell – 25 carries, 76 yards, TD
- DET – Ameer Abdullah – 11 carries, 27 yards

**Top receivers**

- PIT – JuJu Smith-Schuster – 7 receptions, 193 yards, TD
- DET – Marvin Jones Jr. – 6 receptions, 128 yards

**Top tacklers**

- PIT – Artie Burns – 8 tackles, 1 assist
- DET – Tavon Wilson – 7 tackles, 4 assists

In week 8 following their bye-week, the Lions hosted the Pittsburgh Steelers on Sunday Night Football. The teams exchanged field goals in the first quarter, one from Chris Boswell from 34-yards, and one from Matt Prater from 48-yards. The Lions scored nine points in the second quarter via three field goals from Prater, from 37-yards, 51-yards, and 34-yards, respectively. The Steelers responded with a five-yard touchdown run from Le'Veon Bell, to make the score 12–10 in favor of Detroit at half-time. The Steelers scored 10 points in the third quarter via a 38-yard field from Boswell, and a 97-yard touchdown pass from Ben Roethlisberger to JuJu Smith-Schuster. The Lions responded with a 19-yard field goal from Prater in the fourth quarter, making the final score 20–15 in favor of Pittsburgh.

The Lions had 482 total yards of offense without scoring a touchdown. This was the third-highest yardage total without a touchdown in NFL history.

==== Week 9: at Green Bay Packers ====
Week Nine: Detroit Lions at Green Bay Packers – Game summary

Quarter	1	2	3	4	Total
**Lions**	7	7	3	13	**30**
Packers	0	3	0	14	**17**

at Lambeau Field, Green Bay, Wisconsin

- Date: November 6
- Game time: 8:30 p.m. EST/7:30 p.m. CST
- Game weather: 35 °F (2 °C), cloudy
- Game attendance: 77,575
- Referee: Clete Blakeman
- TV announcers (ESPN): Sean McDonough, Jon Gruden and Lisa Salters
- Recap, Gamebook

Game information

**First quarter**

- DET – Marvin Jones Jr. 25-yard pass from Matthew Stafford (Matt Prater kick). Lions 7–0. **Drive: 9 plays, 71 yards, 4:59.**

**Second quarter**

- DET – Ameer Abdullah 4-yard run (Matt Prater kick). Lions 14–0. **Drive: 13 plays, 91 yards, 6:50.**
- GB – Mason Crosby 35-yard field goal. Lions 14–3. **Drive: 12 plays, 68 yards, 2:47.**

**Third quarter**

- DET – Matt Prater 44-yard field goal. Lions 17–3. **Drive: 11 plays, 50 yards, 5:54.**

**Fourth quarter**

- DET – Matt Prater 19-yard field goal. Lions 20–3. **Drive: 12 plays, 63 yards, 6:52.**
- GB – Brett Hundley 1-yard run (Mason Crosby kick). Lions 20–10. **Drive: 7 plays, 78 yards, 2:39.**
- DET – Marvin Jones Jr. 11-yard pass from Matthew Stafford (Matt Prater kick). Lions 27–10. **Drive: 4 plays, 75 yards, 1:46.**
- DET – Matt Prater 31-yard field goal. Lions 30–10. **Drive: 10 plays, 33 yards, 4:21.**
- GB – Jamaal Williams 1-yard run (Mason Crosby kick). Lions 30–17. **Drive: 6 plays, 75 yards, 1:42.**

**Top passers**

- DET – Matthew Stafford – 26/33, 361 yards, 2 TD
- GB – Brett Hundley – 26/38, 245 yards

**Top rushers**

- DET – Ameer Abdullah – 21 carries, 48 yards, TD
- GB – Ty Montgomery – 5 carries, 33 yards

**Top receivers**

- DET – Golden Tate – 7 receptions, 113 yards
- GB – Randall Cobb – 5 receptions, 58 yards

**Top tacklers**

- DET – Jarrad Davis – 7 tackles, 1 assist
- GB – Blake Martinez – 8 tackles, 2 assists

In week 9, the Lions visited their divisional rival, the Green Bay Packers, on Monday Night Football. The Lions took an early lead on their opening drive of the first quarter, which they kept the rest of the game, via a 25-yard touchdown pass from Matthew Stafford to Marvin Jones Jr. The Lions extended their lead in the second quarter via a four-yard touchdown run from Ameer Abdullah. The Packers responded with a 35-yard field goal from Mason Crosby, to make the score 14–3 in favor of Detroit at half-time. The Lions opened the scoring in the second-half via a 44-yard field goal from Matt Prater in the third quarter. The Lions scored 13 points in the fourth quarter via a 19-yard field goal from Prater, an 11-yard touchdown pass from Stafford to Jones, and a 31-yard field goal from Prater. The Packers scored 14 points in the fourth quarter via a one-yard touchdown run from Brett Hundley, and a one-yard touchdown run from Jamaal Williams as time expired, making the final score 30–17 in favor of Detroit, snapping their three-game losing streak. After 23 consecutive road losses against the Packers between 1992 and 2014, the Lions have now won two of the last three meetings in Green Bay.

Matthew Stafford recorded his 200th career touchdown in the first quarter of the game, becoming the fourth quarterback in NFL history to do so before turning 30 years old, a list also occupied by Brett Favre, Dan Marino, and Peyton Manning. The game also marked the first time the Lions did not punt in a game since Thanksgiving Day in 1971.

==== Week 10: vs. Cleveland Browns ====
Week Ten: Cleveland Browns at Detroit Lions – Game summary

Quarter	1	2	3	4	Total
Browns	10	0	14	0	**24**
**Lions**	3	14	7	14	**38**

at Ford Field, Detroit, Michigan

- Date: November 12
- Game time: 1:00 p.m. EST
- Game weather: Played indoors (dome stadium)
- Game attendance: 64,646
- Referee: Carl Cheffers
- TV announcers (CBS): Spero Dedes and Adam Archuleta
- Recap, Gamebook

Game information

**First quarter**

- CLE – Zane Gonzalez 23-yard field goal. Browns 3–0. **Drive: 5 plays, 42 yards, 1:32.**
- CLE – Kenny Britt 19-yard pass from DeShone Kizer (Zane Gonzalez kick) Browns 10–0. **Drive: 3 plays, 31 yards, 1:23.**
- DET – Matt Prater 46-yard field goal. Browns 10–3. **Drive: 7 plays, 47 yards, 2:39.**

**Second quarter**

- DET – Ameer Abdullah 8-yard run (Matt Prater kick) Tied 10–10. **Drive: 8 plays, 90 yards, 4:28.**
- DET – Nevin Lawson 44-yard fumble return (Matt Prater kick) Lions 17–10. **Drive: 5 plays, 21 yards, 2:10.**

**Third quarter**

- CLE – Isaiah Crowell 6-yard run (Zane Gonzalez kick). Tied 17–17. **Drive: 8 plays, 85 yards, 3:59.**
- CLE – DeShone Kizer 1-yard run (Zane Gonzalez kick). Browns 24–17. **Drive: 10 plays, 80 yards, 6:01.**
- DET – Theo Riddick 8-yard pass from Matthew Stafford (Matt Prater kick) Tied 24–24. **Drive: 4 plays, 75 yards, 1:31.**

**Fourth quarter**

- DET – Eric Ebron 29-yard pass from Matthew Stafford (Matt Prater kick) Lions 31–24. **Drive: 9 plays, 61 yards, 4:03.**
- DET – Golden Tate 40-yard pass from Matthew Stafford (Matt Prater kick) Lions 38–24. **Drive: 3 plays, 44 yards, 0:49.**

**Top passers**

- CLE – DeShone Kizer – 21/37, 232 yards, TD, INT
- DET – Matthew Stafford – 17/26, 249 yards, 3 TD, INT

**Top rushers**

- CLE – Isaiah Crowell – 16 carries, 90 yards, TD
- DET – Ameer Abdullah – 11 carries, 52 yards, TD

**Top receivers**

- CLE – Seth DeValve – 4 receptions, 70 yards
- DET – Golden Tate – 6 receptions, 97 yards, TD

**Top tacklers**

- CLE – Christian Kirksey – 4 tackles, 3 assists
- DET – Tahir Whitehead – 7 tackles, 1 assist

In week 10, the Lions hosted the winless Cleveland Browns. The Browns scored 10 points in the first quarter via a 23-yard field goal from Zane Gonzalez, and a 19-yard touchdown pass from DeShone Kizer to Kenny Britt. The Lions responded with a 46-yard field goal from Matt Prater. The Lions tied the game in the second quarter via an eight-yard touchdown run from Ameer Abdullah, and took their first lead of the game via a 44-yard fumble return from Nevin Lawson, to make the score 17–10 in favor of Detroit at half-time. The Browns again tied the score in the third quarter via a six-yard touchdown run from Isaiah Crowell, and regained the lead via a one-yard touchdown run from Kizer. The Lions responded by scoring the final 21 points in the game, first with an eight-yard touchdown pass from Matthew Stafford to Theo Riddick in the third quarter, then via a pair of fourth quarter touchdown passes, first a 29-yard touchdown pass from Stafford to Eric Ebron, and next a 40-yard touchdown pass from Stafford to Golden Tate, making the final score 38–24 in favor of Detroit. The win improved the Lions to 5-4 while, ironically, defeating the team that would recreate their infamous 0-16 campaign.

==== Week 11: at Chicago Bears ====
Week Eleven: Detroit Lions at Chicago Bears – Game summary

Quarter	1	2	3	4	Total
**Lions**	0	21	0	6	**27**
Bears	10	7	0	7	**24**

at Soldier Field, Chicago, Illinois

- Date: November 19
- Game time: 1:00 p.m. EST/12:00 p.m. CST
- Game weather: 33 °F (1 °C), partly cloudy
- Game attendance: 60,635
- Referee: Gene Steratore
- TV announcers (Fox): Thom Brennaman, Chris Spielman and Peter Schrager
- Recap, Gamebook

Game information

**First quarter**

- CHI – Connor Barth 23-yard field goal. Bears 3–0. **Drive: 13 plays, 70 yards, 6:39.**
- CHI – Adam Shaheen 1-yard pass from Mitchell Trubisky (Connor Barth kick). Bears 10–0. **Drive: 3 plays, 55 yards, 1:23.**

**Second quarter**

- DET – D. J. Hayden 27-yard fumble return (Matt Prater kick). Bears 10–7. **Drive: 4 plays, 11 yards, 1:06.**
- CHI – Jordan Howard 12-yard run (Connor Barth kick). Bears 17–7. **Drive: 8 plays, 78 yards, 5:30.**
- DET – Marvin Jones Jr. 28-yard pass from Matthew Stafford (Matt Prater kick). Bears 17–14. **Drive: 7 plays, 86 yards, 3:13.**
- DET – Ameer Abdullah 2-yard pass from Matthew Stafford (Matt Prater kick). Lions 21–17. **Drive: 7 plays, 86 yards, 3:13.**

**Third quarter**

- No scoring

**Fourth quarter**

- DET – Matt Prater 27-yard field goal. Lions 24–17. **Drive: 12 plays, 54 yards, 7:05.**
- CHI – Tarik Cohen 15-yard run (Connor Barth kick). Tied 24–24. **Drive: 8 plays, 78 yards, 4:59.**
- DET – Matt Prater 52-yard field goal. Lions 27–24. **Drive: 9 plays, 42 yards, 3:27.**

**Top passers**

- DET – Matthew Stafford – 21/31, 299 yards, 2 TD
- CHI – Mitchell Trubisky – 18/30, 179 yards, TD

**Top rushers**

- DET – Theo Riddick – 9 carries, 35 yards
- CHI – Jordan Howard – 15 carries, 125 yards, TD

**Top receivers**

- DET – Marvin Jones – 4 receptions, 85 yards, TD
- CHI – Dontrelle Inman – 3 receptions, 43 yards

**Top tacklers**

- DET – Tahir Whitehead – 8 tackles, 1 assist
- CHI – Christian Jones – 6 tackles, 2 assists

In week 11, the Lions visited their division rival, the Chicago Bears. The Bears scored 10 points in the first quarter via a 23-yard field goal from Connor Barth, and a one-yard touchdown pass from Mitchell Trubisky to Adam Shaheen. The Lions scored 21 points in the second quarter via a 27-yard fumble return from D. J. Hayden, a 28-yard touchdown pass from Matthew Stafford to Marvin Jones Jr. and a two-yard touchdown pass from Stafford to Ameer Abdullah. The Bears responded with a 12-yard touchdown run from Jordan Howard, to make the score 21–17 in favor of Detroit at half-time. After a scoreless third quarter, the Lions extended their lead in the fourth quarter via a 27-yard field goal from Matt Prater. The Bears responded with a 15-yard touchdown run from Tarik Cohen to tie the game. The Lions regained the lead via a 52-yard field goal from Prater. The Bears attempted comeback failed when Barth missed a potentially game-tying 46-yard field goal attempt with eight seconds remaining in the game, making the final score 27–24 in favor of Detroit. With the win, the Lions won all of their division games on the road in a season for the first time in franchise history.

==== Week 12: vs. Minnesota Vikings ====
See also NFL on Thanksgiving Day

Week Twelve: Minnesota Vikings at Detroit Lions – Game summary

Quarter	1	2	3	4	Total
**Vikings**	13	7	7	3	**30**
Lions	0	10	6	7	**23**

at Ford Field, Detroit, Michigan

- Date: November 23
- Game time: 12:30 p.m. EST
- Game weather: Played indoors (dome stadium)
- Game attendance: 66,613
- Referee: Tony Corrente
- TV announcers (Fox): Joe Buck, Troy Aikman, Mike Pereira and Erin Andrews
- Recap, Gamebook

Game information

**First quarter**

- MIN – Kyle Rudolph 1-yard pass from Case Keenum. Vikings 6–0. **Drive: 14 plays, 80 yards, 6:59.**
- MIN – Case Keenum 9-yard run. (Kai Forbath kick). Vikings 13–0. **Drive: 3 plays, 39 yards, 0:56.**

**Second quarter**

- DET – Matt Prater 32-yard field goal. Vikings 13–3. **Drive: 12 plays, 69 yards, 5:33.**
- MIN – Kyle Rudolph 22-yard pass from Case Keenum (Kai Forbath kick). Vikings 20–3. **Drive: 5 plays, 74 yards, 1:21.**
- DET – Marvin Jones Jr. 6-yard pass from Matthew Stafford (Matt Prater kick). Vikings 20–10. **Drive: 3 plays, 75 yards, 0:27.**

**Third quarter**

- MIN – Latavius Murray 2-yard run (Kai Forbath kick). Vikings 27–10. **Drive: 4 plays, 75 yards, 2:08.**
- DET – Matt Prater 32-yard field goal. Vikings 27–13. **Drive: 12 plays, 61 yards, 5:44.**
- DET – Matt Prater 50-yard field goal. Vikings 27–16. **Drive: 8 plays, 40 yards, 4:01.**

**Fourth quarter**

- DET – Marvin Jones Jr. 43-yard pass from Matthew Stafford (Matt Prater kick). Vikings 27–23. **Drive: 3 plays, 39 yards, 0:33.**
- MIN – Kai Forbath 36-yard field goal. Vikings 30–23. **Drive: 9 plays, 45 yards, 2:39.**

**Top passers**

- MIN – Case Keenum – 21/30, 282 yards, 2 TD
- DET – Matthew Stafford – 20/35, 250 yards, 2 TD, INT

**Top rushers**

- MIN – Latavius Murray – 20 carries, 84 yards, TD
- DET – Theo Riddick – 5 carries, 20 yards

**Top receivers**

- MIN – Adam Thielen – 8 receptions, 89 yards
- DET – Marvin Jones Jr. – 6 receptions, 109 yards, 2 TD

**Top tacklers**

- MIN – Andrew Sendejo – 6 tackles, 1 assist
- DET – Tahir Whitehead – 10 tackles, 3 assist

For their annual Thanksgiving Day game, the Lions hosted a rematch with their divisional rival, the Minnesota Vikings. The Vikings scored 13 points in the first quarter via a one-yard touchdown pass from Case Keenum to Kyle Rudolph, and a nine-yard touchdown run from Keenum. The Lions responded with 10 points in the second quarter via a 32-yard field goal from Matt Prater and a six-yard touchdown pass from Matthew Stafford to Marvin Jones Jr. The Vikings extended their lead in the second quarter via a 22-yard touchdown pass from Keenum to Rudolph to make the score 20–10 in favor of Minnesota at half-time. The Vikings opened the scoring in the second half via a two-yard touchdown run from Latavius Murray. The Lions responded with two field goals from Prater in the third quarter from 32-yards, and 50-yards, respectively. The Lions reduced the Vikings lead to four points in the fourth via a 43-yard touchdown pass from Stafford to Jones. The Vikings extended their lead in the fourth quarter via a 36-yard field goal from Kai Forbath. The Lions' attempted comeback failed when Stafford's pass intended for Jones was intercepted by Xavier Rhodes. On the Vikings' ensuing drive, Forbath's 25-yard field goal attempt was blocked by Darius Slay and recovered by Nevin Lawson and returned for a 77-yard touchdown, which was then nullified due to an offside penalty on Slay, making the final score 30–23 in favor of Minnesota, snapping the Lions' three-game winning streak and snapping the team's four-game Thanksgiving Day win streak.

==== Week 13: at Baltimore Ravens ====
Week Thirteen: Detroit Lions at Baltimore Ravens – Game summary

Quarter	1	2	3	4	Total
Lions	0	0	13	7	**20**
**Ravens**	3	17	0	24	**44**

at M&T Bank Stadium, Baltimore, Maryland

- Date: December 3
- Game time: 1:00 p.m. EST
- Game weather: 53 °F (12 °C), partly sunny
- Game attendance: 70,500
- Referee: Jerome Boger
- TV announcers (Fox): Thom Brennaman, Chris Spielman and Peter Schrager
- Recap, Gamebook

Game information

**First quarter**

- BAL – Justin Tucker 38-yard field goal. Ravens 3–0. **Drive: 8 plays, 28 yards, 3:49.**

**Second quarter**

- BAL – Benjamin Watson 1-yard pass from Joe Flacco (Justin Tucker kick). Ravens 10–0. **Drive: 2 plays, 67 yards, 0:58.**
- BAL – Patrick Ricard 3-yard pass from Joe Flacco (Justin Tucker kick). Ravens 17–0. **Drive: 6 plays, 36 yards, 2:48.**
- BAL – Justin Tucker 46-yard field goal. Ravens 20–0. **Drive: 3 plays, 17 yards, 0:17.**

**Third quarter**

- DET – Theo Riddick 4-yard run (Matt Prater kick). Ravens 20–7. **Drive: 7 plays, 75 yards, 2:49.**
- DET – Tion Green 6-yard run. Ravens 20–13. **Drive: 7 plays, 75 yards, 4:08.**

**Fourth quarter**

- BAL – Alex Collins 7-yard run (Justin Tucker kick). Ravens 27–13. **Drive: 9 plays, 74 yards, 4:36.**
- DET – Nick Bellore 1-yard pass from Matthew Stafford (Matt Prater kick). Ravens 27–20. **Drive: 5 plays, 75 yards, 2:19.**
- BAL – Justin Tucker 51-yard field goal. Ravens 30–20. **Drive: 7 plays, 23 yards, 3:26.**
- BAL – Alex Collins 6-yard run (Justin Tucker kick). Ravens 37–20. **Drive: 4 plays, 31 yards, 2:01.**
- BAL – Eric Weddle 45-yard interception return (Justin Tucker kick). Ravens 44–20. **Drive: 5 plays, 14 yards, 1:34.**

**Top passers**

- DET – Matthew Stafford - 24/29, 292 yards, TD, INT
- BAL – Joe Flacco – 23/36, 269 yards, 2 TD

**Top rushers**

- DET – Tion Green – 11 carries, 51 yards, TD
- BAL – Alex Collins – 15 carries, 75 yards, 2 TD

**Top receivers**

- DET – Marvin Jones Jr. – 4 receptions, 90 yards
- BAL – Mike Wallace – 5 receptions, 116 yards

**Top tacklers**

- DET – Jarrad Davis – 3 tackles, 5 assists
- BAL – Patrick Onwuasor – 6 tackles, 1 assist

In week 13, the Lions visited the Baltimore Ravens. The Ravens opened the scoring in the first quarter via a 38-yard field goal from Justin Tucker. The Ravens added 17 points in the second quarter via a one-yard touchdown pass from Joe Flacco to Benjamin Watson, a three-yard touchdown pass from Flacco to Patrick Ricard, and a 46-yard field goal from Tucker, giving the Ravens a 20–0 lead at the intermission. After half-time, the Lions finally got on the board and scored 13 points in the third quarter via a four-yard touchdown run from Theo Riddick, and a six-yard touchdown run from Tion Green (the first of his career), reducing the Ravens' lead to seven points. The Ravens responded with 24 points in the fourth quarter via a seven-yard touchdown run from Alex Collins, a 51-yard field goal from Tucker, a six-yard touchdown run from Collins, and a 45-yard interception return from Eric Weddle. The Lions scored via a one-yard touchdown pass from Matthew Stafford to Nick Bellore, making the final score 44–20 in favor of Baltimore.

==== Week 14: at Tampa Bay Buccaneers ====
Week Fourteen: Detroit Lions at Tampa Bay Buccaneers – Game summary

Quarter	1	2	3	4	Total
**Lions**	7	7	7	3	**24**
Buccaneers	7	0	0	14	**21**

at Raymond James Stadium, Tampa, Florida

- Date: December 10
- Game time: 1:00 p.m. EST
- Game weather: 55 °F (13 °C), clear
- Game attendance: 60,372
- Referee: Ed Hochuli
- TV announcers (Fox): Kenny Albert, Ronde Barber and Kristina Pink
- Recap, Gamebook

Game information

**First quarter**

- DET – Theo Riddick 2-yard run. (Matt Prater kick). Lions 7–0. **Drive: 7 plays, 74 yards, 3:04.**
- TB – Doug Martin 1-yard run. (Patrick Murray kick). Tied 7–7. **Drive: 11 plays, 75 yards, 5:14.**

**Second quarter**

- DET – Golden Tate 5-yard pass from Matthew Stafford. (Matt Prater kick). Lions 14–7. **Drive: 6 plays, 46 yards, 3:21.**

**Third quarter**

- DET - Theo Riddick 18-yard run. (Matt Prater kick). Lions 21–7. **Drive: 6 plays, 51 yards, 2:59.**

**Fourth quarter**

- TB – O. J. Howard 2-yard pass from Jameis Winston (Patrick Murray kick). Lions 21–14. **Drive: 10 plays, 75 yards, 4:30.**
- TB – Leonard Wester 2-yard pass from Jameis Winston (Patrick Murray kick). Tied 21–21. **Drive: 6 plays, 72 yards, 2:06.**
- DET – Matt Prater 46-yard field goal. Lions 24–21. **Drive: 9 plays, 49 yards, 2:34.**

**Top passers**

- DET – Matthew Stafford – 36/44, 381 yards, TD, 2 INT
- TB – Jameis Winston – 26/38, 285 yards, 2 TD, 2 INT

**Top rushers**

- DET – Theo Riddick – 10 carries, 29 yards, 2 TD
- TB – Peyton Barber – 12 carries, 58 yards

**Top receivers**

- DET – Eric Ebron – 10 receptions, 94 yards
- TB – Chris Godwin – 5 receptions, 68 yards

**Top tacklers**

- DET – Glover Quin – 8 tackles, 1 assist
- TB – Lavonte David – 13 tackles, 1 assist

In week 14, the Lions visited the Tampa Bay Buccaneers. Each team exchanged touchdowns in the first quarter. First a two-yard touchdown run from Detroit's Theo Riddick, then a one-yard touchdown run from Tampa Bay's Doug Martin. The only score of the second quarter was a five-yard touchdown pass from Matthew Stafford to Golden Tate, to make the score 14–7 in favor of Detroit at half-time. The Lions scored the only points of the third quarter when Riddick ran in his second touchdown of the game, this time from 18-yards. Tampa Bay responded with back-to-back touchdowns in the fourth quarter, first with a two-yard touchdown pass from Jameis Winston to O. J. Howard, then a two-yard touchdown pass from Winston to Leonard Wester to tie the game at 21. Matt Prater kicked a 46-yard field goal with 20 seconds left in the game, making the final score 24–21 in favor of Detroit.

==== Week 15: vs. Chicago Bears ====
Week Fifteen: Chicago Bears at Detroit Lions – Game summary

Quarter	1	2	3	4	Total
Bears	0	3	0	7	**10**
**Lions**	3	10	7	0	**20**

at Ford Field, Detroit, Michigan

- Date: December 16
- Game time: 4:30 p.m. EST
- Game weather: Played indoors (dome stadium)
- Game attendance: 65,872
- Referee: Jeff Triplette
- TV announcers (NFLN): Mike Tirico, Kurt Warner and Heather Cox
- Recap, Gamebook

Game information
- DET – Matt Prater 48-yard field goal. Lions 3–0. **Drive: 8 plays, 47 yards, 3:02.**

**Second quarter**

- DET – Matt Prater 31-yard field goal. Lions 6–0. **Drive: 11 plays, 49 yards, 5:27.**
- DET – T. J. Jones 3-yard pass from Matthew Stafford (Matt Prater kick). Lions 13–0. **Drive: 10 plays, 92 yards, 5:44.**
- CHI – Mike Nugent 41-yard field goal. Lions 13–3. **Drive: 2 plays, 4 yards, 0:10.**

**Third quarter**

- DET – Eric Ebron 8-yard pass from Matthew Stafford (Matt Prater kick). Lions 20–3. **Drive: 9 plays, 41 yards, 4:22.**

**Fourth quarter**

- CHI – Benny Cunningham 9-yard pass from Mitchell Trubisky (Mike Nugent kick). Lions 20–10. **Drive: 13 plays, 92 yards, 6:51.**

**Top passers**

- CHI – Mitchell Trubisky – 31/46, 314 yards, TD, 3 INT
- DET – Matthew Stafford – 25/33, 237 yards, 2 TD

**Top rushers**

- CHI – Jordan Howard – 10 carries, 37 yards
- DET – Theo Riddick – 8 carries, 49 yards

**Top receivers**

- CHI – Kendall Wright – 7 receptions, 81 yards
- DET – Marvin Jones Jr. – 3 receptions, 85 yards

**Top tacklers**

- CHI – Eddie Jackson – 7 tackles, 1 assist
- DET – Tahir Whitehead – 6 tackles, 3 assists

In week 15, the Lions donned brand new all-silver uniforms and hosted a Saturday evening rematch with their division rivals, the Chicago Bears. The Lions opened the scoring in the first quarter via a 48-yard field goal from Matt Prater. The Lions extended their lead in the second quarter via a 31-yard field goal from Prater, and a three-yard touchdown pass from Matthew Stafford to T. J. Jones. The Bears got on the board via a 41-yard field goal from Mike Nugent with two seconds remaining in the first half, to make the score 13–3 in favor of Detroit at half-time. The Lions scored the only points in the third quarter via an eight-yard touchdown pass from Stafford to Eric Ebron. The Bears scored the only points in the fourth quarter via a nine-yard touchdown pass from Mitchell Trubisky to Benny Cunningham, making the final score 20–10 in favor of Detroit.

==== Week 16: at Cincinnati Bengals ====
Week Sixteen: Detroit Lions at Cincinnati Bengals – Game summary

Quarter	1	2	3	4	Total
Lions	7	0	3	7	**17**
**Bengals**	0	6	7	13	**26**

at Paul Brown Stadium, Cincinnati, Ohio

- Date: December 24
- Game time: 1:00 p.m. EST
- Game weather: 35 °F (2 °C), mostly cloudy
- Game attendance: 47,732
- Referee: Gene Steratore
- TV announcers (Fox): Thom Brennaman, Chris Spielman and Jen Hale
- Recap, Gamebook

Game information

**First quarter**

- DET - Eric Ebron 33-yard pass from Matthew Stafford (Matt Prater kick). Lions 7–0. **Drive: 4 plays, 52 yards, 0:54.**

**Second quarter**

- CIN - Randy Bullock 29-yard field goal. Lions 7–3. **Drive: 12 plays, 68 yards, 4:48.**
- CIN - Randy Bullock 27-yard field goal. Lions 7–6. **Drive: 8 plays, 44 yards, 1:01.**

**Third quarter**

- DET - Matt Prater 23-yard field goal. Lions 10–6. **Drive: 11 plays, 61 yards, 5:34.**
- CIN - C. J. Uzomah 1-yard pass from Andy Dalton (Randy Bullock kick). Bengals 13–10. **Drive: 7 plays, 75 yards, 3:34.**

**Fourth quarter**

- CIN - Randy Bullock 35-yard field goal. Bengals 16–10. **Drive: 11 plays, 43 yards, 4:33.**
- DET - Tion Green 5-yard run (Matt Prater kick). Lions 17–16. **Drive: 10 plays, 75 yards, 4:24.**
- CIN - Randy Bullock 51-yard field goal. Bengals 19–17. **Drive: 11 plays, 53 yards, 5:07.**
- CIN - Giovani Bernard 12-yard run (Randy Bullock Kick). Bengals 26–17. **Drive: 6 plays, 40 yards, 1:48.**

**Top passers**

- DET – Matthew Stafford – 19/35, 203 yards, TD, INT
- CIN – Andy Dalton – 27/41, 238 yards, TD, INT

**Top rushers**

- DET – Tion Green – 7 carries, 43 yards, TD
- CIN – Giovani Bernard – 23 carries, 116 yards, TD

**Top receivers**

- DET – Eric Ebron – 5 receptions, 83 yards, TD
- CIN – A. J. Green – 6 receptions, 81 yards

**Top tacklers**

- DET – Glover Quin – 5 tackles, 4 assists
- CIN – Darqueze Dennard – 5 tackles, 2 assists

In week 16, the Lions visited the Cincinnati Bengals on Christmas Eve to finish their road schedule. The Lions took an early lead when Eric Ebron caught a 33-yard touchdown pass from Matthew Stafford for the only points of the first quarter. The Bengals' Randy Bullock kicked a pair of field goals in the second quarter, from 29-yards and 27-yards, respectively, to make the score 7–6 in favor of Detroit at half-time. The Lions extended their lead in the third quarter when Matt Prater kicked a 23-yard field goal, but then the Bengals took their first lead of the game when C. J. Uzomah caught a one-yard touchdown pass from Andy Dalton. In the fourth quarter the Bengals extended their lead when Bullock scored another field goal from 35-yards out, then Detroit's Tion Green ran in a touchdown from five-yards out to give the Lions a 17–16 lead. However, Cincinnati regained the lead when they added ten more points with a 51-yard field goal from Bullock and a 12-yard touchdown run from Giovani Bernard to make the final score 26–17 in favor of the Bengals. With the loss, the Lions were eliminated from playoff contention.

==== Week 17: vs. Green Bay Packers ====
Week Seventeen: Green Bay Packers at Detroit Lions – Game summary

Quarter	1	2	3	4	Total
Packers	3	0	0	8	**11**
**Lions**	3	17	7	8	**35**

at Ford Field, Detroit, Michigan

- Date: December 31
- Game time: 1:00 p.m. EST
- Game weather: Played indoors (dome stadium)
- Game attendance: 62,501
- Referee: Pete Morelli
- TV announcers (Fox): Dick Stockton, Mark Schlereth and Shannon Spake
- Recap, Gamebook

Game information

**First quarter**

- GB - Mason Crosby 41-yard field goal. Packers 3–0. **Drive: 8 plays, 45 yards, 3:58.**
- DET - Matt Prater 28-yard field goal. Tied 3–3. **Drive: 5 plays, 64 yards, 1:57.**

**Second quarter**

- DET - Kenny Golladay 54-yard pass from Matthew Stafford (Matt Prater kick). Lions 10–3. **Drive: 9 plays, 88 yards, 3:54.**
- DET - Marvin Jones Jr. 3-yard pass from Matthew Stafford (Matt Prater kick). Lions 17–3. **Drive: 2 plays, 14 yards, 0:42.**
- DET - Matt Prater 30-yard field goal. Lions 20–3. **Drive: 5 plays, 23 yards, 1:10.**

**Third quarter**

- DET - Golden Tate 71-yard pass from Matthew Stafford (Matt Prater kick). Lions 27–3. **Drive: 1 plays, 71 yards, 0:12.**

**Fourth quarter**

- GB - Randall Cobb 17-yard pass from Brett Hundley (Randall Cobb pass from Brett Hundley is complete for 2-point conversion). Lions 27–11. **Drive: 8 plays, 75 yards, 5:11.**
- DET - Ameer Abdullah 7-yard run (Matthew Stafford pass from Golden Tate is complete for 2-point conversion). Lions 35–11. **Drive: 1 plays, 71 yards, 0:12.**

**Top passers**

- GB – Brett Hundley – 14/24, 172 yards, TD, 2 INT
- DET – Matthew Stafford – 20/29, 323 yards, 3 TD

**Top rushers**

- GB – Jamaal Williams – 22 carries, 82 yards
- DET – Tion Green – 9 carries, 21 yards

**Top receivers**

- GB – Trevor Davis – 3 receptions, 56 yards
- DET – Golden Tate – 7 receptions, 104 yards, TD

**Top tacklers**

- GB – Blake Martinez – 4 tackles, 2 assists
- DET – Jarrad Davis – 8 tackles, 4 assists

To finish the season, the Lions hosted a rematch with their divisional rivals, the Green Bay Packers, on New Year's Eve. The teams exchanged field goals in the first quarter, one from Green Bay's Mason Crosby from 41-yards, and one from Detroit's Matt Prater from 28-yards. The Lions scored 17 points in the second quarter via a 54-yard touchdown pass from Matthew Stafford to Kenny Golladay, a three-yard touchdown pass from Stafford to Marvin Jones Jr., and a 30-yard field goal from Prater, to make the score 20–3 in favor of Detroit at half-time. The Lions extended their lead in the third quarter via a 71-yard touchdown pass from Stafford to Golden Tate. Each team exchanged touchdowns in the fourth quarter. First a 17-yard touchdown pass from Brett Hundley to Randall Cobb of the Packers, followed by a two-point conversion pass from Hundley to Cobb for the Packers. Then the Lions scored the game's final points with a seven-yard touchdown run from Ameer Abdullah, followed by a two-point conversion pass from Tate to Stafford, making the final score 35–11 in favor of Detroit. With the win, it marked the first time the Lions beat the Packers twice in the regular season since 1991. The Lions also had their first back-to-back winning seasons since 1994 and 1995.

== Standings ==
=== Division ===
NFC North
	W	L	T	PCT	DIV	CONF	PF	PA	STK
^{(2)} Minnesota Vikings	13	3	0	.813	5–1	10–2	382	252	W3
Detroit Lions	9	7	0	.563	5–1	8–4	410	376	W1
Green Bay Packers	7	9	0	.438	2–4	5–7	320	384	L3
Chicago Bears	5	11	0	.313	0–6	1–11	264	320	L1

=== Conference ===
NFC
#	Team	Division	W	L	T	PCT	DIV	CONF	SOS	SOV	STK
Division leaders
1 (Note: Philadelphia claimed the No. 1 seed over Minnesota based on winning percentage vs. common opponents. Philadelphia's cumulative record against Carolina, Chicago, the Los Angeles Rams and Washington was 5–0, compared to Minnesota's 4–1 cumulative record against the same four teams.)	Philadelphia Eagles	East	13	3	0	.813	5–1	10–2	.461	.433	L1
2	Minnesota Vikings	North	13	3	0	.813	5–1	10–2	.492	.447	W3
3 (Note: LA Rams claimed the No. 3 seed over New Orleans based on head-to-head victory.)	Los Angeles Rams	West	11	5	0	.688	4–2	7–5	.504	.460	L1
4 (Note: New Orleans clinched the NFC South division over Carolina based on head-to-head sweep.)	New Orleans Saints	South	11	5	0	.688	4–2	8–4	.535	.483	L1
Wild Cards
5	Carolina Panthers	South	11	5	0	.688	3–3	7–5	.539	.500	L1
6	Atlanta Falcons	South	10	6	0	.625	4–2	9–3	.543	.475	W1
Did not qualify for the postseason
7 (Note: Detroit finished ahead of Dallas and Seattle based on conference record, while Seattle finished ahead of Dallas based on head-to-head victory.)	Detroit Lions	North	9	7	0	.563	5–1	8–4	.496	.368	W1
8	Seattle Seahawks	West	9	7	0	.563	4–2	7–5	.492	.444	L1
9	Dallas Cowboys	East	9	7	0	.563	5–1	7–5	.496	.438	W1
10	Arizona Cardinals	West	8	8	0	.500	3–3	5–7	.488	.406	W2
11 (Note: Green Bay finished ahead of Washington based on record vs. common opponents. Green Bay's cumulative record against Dallas, Minnesota, New Orleans and Seattle was 2–3, compared to Washington's 1–4 cumulative record against the same four teams.)	Green Bay Packers	North	7	9	0	.438	2–4	5–7	.539	.357	L3
12	Washington Redskins	East	7	9	0	.438	1–5	5–7	.539	.429	L1
13	San Francisco 49ers	West	6	10	0	.375	1–5	3–9	.512	.438	W5
14 (Note: Tampa Bay finished ahead of Chicago based on head-to-head victory.)	Tampa Bay Buccaneers	South	5	11	0	.313	1–5	3–9	.555	.375	W1
15	Chicago Bears	North	5	11	0	.313	0–6	1–11	.559	.500	L1
16	New York Giants	East	3	13	0	.188	1–5	1–11	.531	.458	W1
Tiebreakers (Note: When breaking ties for three or more teams under the NFL's rules, they are first broken within divisions, then comparing only the highest-ranked remaining team from each division.)
