= Nevin Lawson =

Jamaican-born American football player (born 1991)

No. 43, 24, 26, 21
- Position: Cornerback

Personal information
- Born: April 23, 1991 (age 35); Kingston, Jamaica
- Listed height: 5 ft 9 in (1.75 m)
- Listed weight: 190 lb (86 kg)

Career information
- High school: Piper (Sunrise, Florida, U.S.)
- College: Utah State (2010–2013)
- NFL draft: 2014: 4th round, 133rd overall pick

Career history
- Detroit Lions (2014–2018); Oakland / Las Vegas Raiders (2019–2021); Jacksonville Jaguars (2021)

Awards and highlights
- First-team All-MWC (2013); Second-team All-WAC (2012)

Career NFL statistics
- Total tackles: 319
- Sacks: 2.0
- Forced fumbles: 3
- Fumble recoveries: 2
- Interceptions: 1
- Defensive touchdowns: 1
- Stats at Pro Football Reference

Nevin Andre Lawson (born April 23, 1991) is a Jamaican-born former professional American football cornerback. He was selected by the Detroit Lions in the fourth round of the 2014 NFL draft. He played college football at Utah State.

== Early life ==
Lawson migrated from Jamaica to South Florida with his family at age six. He attended Piper High School in Sunrise, Florida, where he started at both cornerback and running back. As a senior, he recorded 68 tackles with three interceptions for the Bengals, while offensively, he added 41 carries for 526 yards and eight touchdowns. He also had two punt returns for touchdowns, and was named team MVP.

He was considered a two-star recruit by Rivals.com.

== College career ==
Lawson attended Utah State University, where he played for the Utah State Aggies football team from 2010 to 2013. As a true freshman in 2010, he appeared in nine games, making two starts for the Aggies. He made 12 total tackles, while breaking up one pass and intercepting one. In 2011, he started all 13 games, finishing fourth overall on the team in tackles with 73, while adding 10 pass break ups and one interception. In 2012, he started all 13 games, earning second-team All-Western Athletic Conference (WAC) honors after recording 63 tackles, four for loss, two sacks and ten pass break-ups. As a senior in 2013, Lawson recorded 57 tackles, while breaking up 13 passes, and intercepting a career-high four interceptions, returning one 65 yards for a touchdown against Boise State. He earned first-team All-Mountain West Conference (MWC) honors following the regular season.

== Professional career ==
=== Pre-draft ===
Coming out of Utah State, NFL draft experts and scouts were conflicted on Lawson's draft projection. Some analysts and draft experts projected him to be drafted anywhere from the third or fourth round, while others projected him to be a seventh round pick or priority undrafted free agent. He received an invitation to the NFL Combine and completed all of the required combine and positional drills. On May 1, 2014, Lawson attended Utah State's pro day and opted to perform all of the combine drills, except for the bench press. He made progress on all of the drills except for the three-cone drill. He was ranked as the 17th best cornerback available in the draft by NFLDraftScout.com. Scouting reports said Lawson was a durable and productive player who has a muscular build, good man coverage skills, and the ability to read and react quickly. His biggest flaws were said to be his inconsistent play and mediocre press technique and ball skills.

Pre-draft measurables
Height	Weight	Arm length	Hand span	Wingspan	40-yard dash	10-yard split	20-yard split	20-yard shuttle	Three-cone drill	Vertical jump	Broad jump	Bench press
5 ft 9 1/2 in (1.77 m)	190 lb (86 kg)	31 1/2 in (0.80 m)	9 in (0.23 m)	6 ft 4 3/4 in (1.95 m)	4.38 s	1.58 s	2.60 s	4.13 s	7.12 s	34.5 in (0.88 m)	10 ft 0 in (3.05 m)	16 reps
All values from NFL Combine/Pro Day

=== Detroit Lions ===
==== 2014 ====
The Detroit Lions selected Lawson in the fourth round (133rd overall) of the 2014 NFL draft. On May 18, 2014, the Lions signed Lawson to a four-year, $2.52 million contract that includes a signing bonus of $300,584.

During the training camp in his rookie season, Lawson competed for the starting cornerback job against Bill Bentley, Rashean Mathis, Aaron Hester, Jonte Green, and Cassius Vaughn. Head coach Jim Caldwell named Lawson the Lions' fourth cornerback to begin his rookie season, behind Darius Slay, Mathis, and Bentley.

He made his professional regular season debut during the Lions' season-opening 35–14 victory over the New York Giants and finished with one solo tackle. He became the second cornerback on the Lions' depth chart after Bentley tore his ACL and was placed on injured reserve. On September 14, 2014, Lawson dislocated multiple toes during a 24–7 loss to the Carolina Panthers. After receiving immediate surgery in North Carolina, he was placed on injured reserved, effectively ending his rookie season.

==== 2015 ====
Lawson entered training camp competing with Crezdon Butler, Chris Owens, and Quandre Diggs for the third cornerback position. He was named the starting nickelback to begin the regular season.

On November 1, 2015, Lawson earned the first start of his career and had a season-high seven combined tackles and a pass deflection during a 45–10 loss to the Kansas City Chiefs. He started in place of Mathis who was unable to play after suffering from recurring symptoms from a concussion he received during a Week 7 loss to the Minnesota Vikings. He remained the starter for the remainder of the season after Mathis was diagnosed with a brain injury and placed on injured reserve three days later. In Week 10, he made a season-high seven solo tackles and defended a pass as the Lions defeated the Green Bay Packers 18–16. He finished the season with 47 combined tackles (42 solo) and seven pass deflections in eight starts and 15 games.

==== 2016 ====
Throughout training camp in 2016, he competed with Quandre Diggs, Crezdon Butler, and Alex Carter for the starting cornerback job. Lawson was named the Lions' starting cornerback, along with Darius Slay, to start the season.

He started the Lions' season-opener and made four combined tackles in a 39–35 win against the Indianapolis Colts. On October 2, 2016, he recorded a season-high seven combined tackles during a 17–14 loss to the Chicago Bears. He finished 2016 with 57 tackles (46 solo) and nine passes defensed in 16 games and 16 starts. The Lions received a playoff berth after finishing the 2016 season with a 9–7 record. On January 7, 2017, Lawson started the first playoff game of his career and collected seven combined tackles as the Lions were defeated 6–26 to the Seattle Seahawks in the NFC Wildcard game.

==== 2017 ====
Lawson received competition during the Lions' training camp in 2017. He was named one of the starting cornerbacks with Darius Slay after winning the job of free agent acquisition D. J. Hayden and rookie Teez Tabor.

He started in the Lions' season-opening 35–23 victory over the Arizona Cardinals and recorded three solo tackles and one pass deflection. In Week 4, Lawson made four solo tackles and two pass deflections in a 14–7 win over the Vikings. During Week 10 game against the Cleveland Browns, Lawson forced a fumble from Seth DeValve and returned it 44 yards for his first career touchdown.

==== 2018 ====
On March 13, 2018, Lawson signed a two-year, $9.2 million contract extension with the Lions. He played in 15 games with 14 starts, recording 53 combined tackles, one sack, and five passes defensed.

On March 10, 2019, Lawson was released by the Lions.

=== Oakland / Las Vegas Raiders ===
On March 19, 2019, Lawson signed with the Oakland Raiders on a one-year $3.05 million deal. He was suspended the first four games of the 2019 season due to a failed drug test. He was reinstated from suspension on September 30, and was activated on October 7.

On January 3, 2020, the NFL announced Lawson would be suspended for one game after using his helmet as a weapon in the Week 17 game against the Denver Broncos. On January 23, 2020, he signed a one-year contract extension with the Raiders. He was reinstated from suspension and activated on September 15, 2020. Lawson was fined US$15,000 by the NFL on October 5, 2020, for attending a maskless charity event hosted by teammate Darren Waller during the COVID-19 pandemic in violation of the NFL's COVID-19 protocols for the 2020 season. In Week 10 against the Broncos, Lawson forced a fumble on wide receiver DaeSean Hamilton and recovered the ball himself during the 37–12 win.

Lawson re-signed with the Raiders on March 23, 2021. He was suspended by the NFL for the first two games of the 2021 NFL season for violating the league's performance-enhancing drug policy on April 2, 2021. The Raiders released him on September 20, 2021.

=== Jacksonville Jaguars ===
On September 22, 2021, Lawson signed with the Jacksonville Jaguars. He recorded his first career interception with the team against the Miami Dolphins on October 17, 2021.

== NFL career statistics ==
Legend
**Bold**	Career high

=== Regular season ===
Year	Team	Games		Tackles					Interceptions					Fumbles			
Year	Team	GP	GS	Cmb	Solo	Ast	Sck	TFL	Int	Yds	TD	Lng	PD	FF	FR	Yds	TD
2014	DET	2	0	1	1	0	0.0	0	0	0	0	0	0	0	0	0	0
2015	DET	15	9	47	42	5	0.0	0	0	0	0	0	7	0	0	0	0
2016	DET	**16**	**16**	57	46	11	0.0	0	0	0	0	0	**9**	0	0	0	0
2017	DET	15	15	47	40	7	0.0	0	0	0	0	0	4	1	**1**	**44**	**1**
2018	DET	15	14	53	43	10	**1.0**	**3**	0	0	0	0	5	0	0	0	0
2019	OAK	11	5	24	20	4	0.0	2	0	0	0	0	5	0	0	0	0
2020	LVR	14	9	**61**	**47**	**14**	**1.0**	1	0	0	0	0	4	**2**	**1**	0	0
2021	JAX	12	4	29	21	8	0.0	0	**1**	**11**	0	**11**	5	0	0	0	0
		100	72	319	260	59	2.0	6	1	11	0	11	39	3	2	44	1

=== Playoffs ===
Year	Team	Games		Tackles					Interceptions					Fumbles			
Year	Team	GP	GS	Cmb	Solo	Ast	Sck	TFL	Int	Yds	TD	Lng	PD	FF	FR	Yds	TD
2016	DET	**1**	**1**	**7**	**5**	**2**	0.0	0	0	0	0	0	0	0	0	0	0
		1	1	7	5	2	0.0	0	0	0	0	0	0	0	0	0	0
