= D. J. Hayden =

American football player (1990–2023)

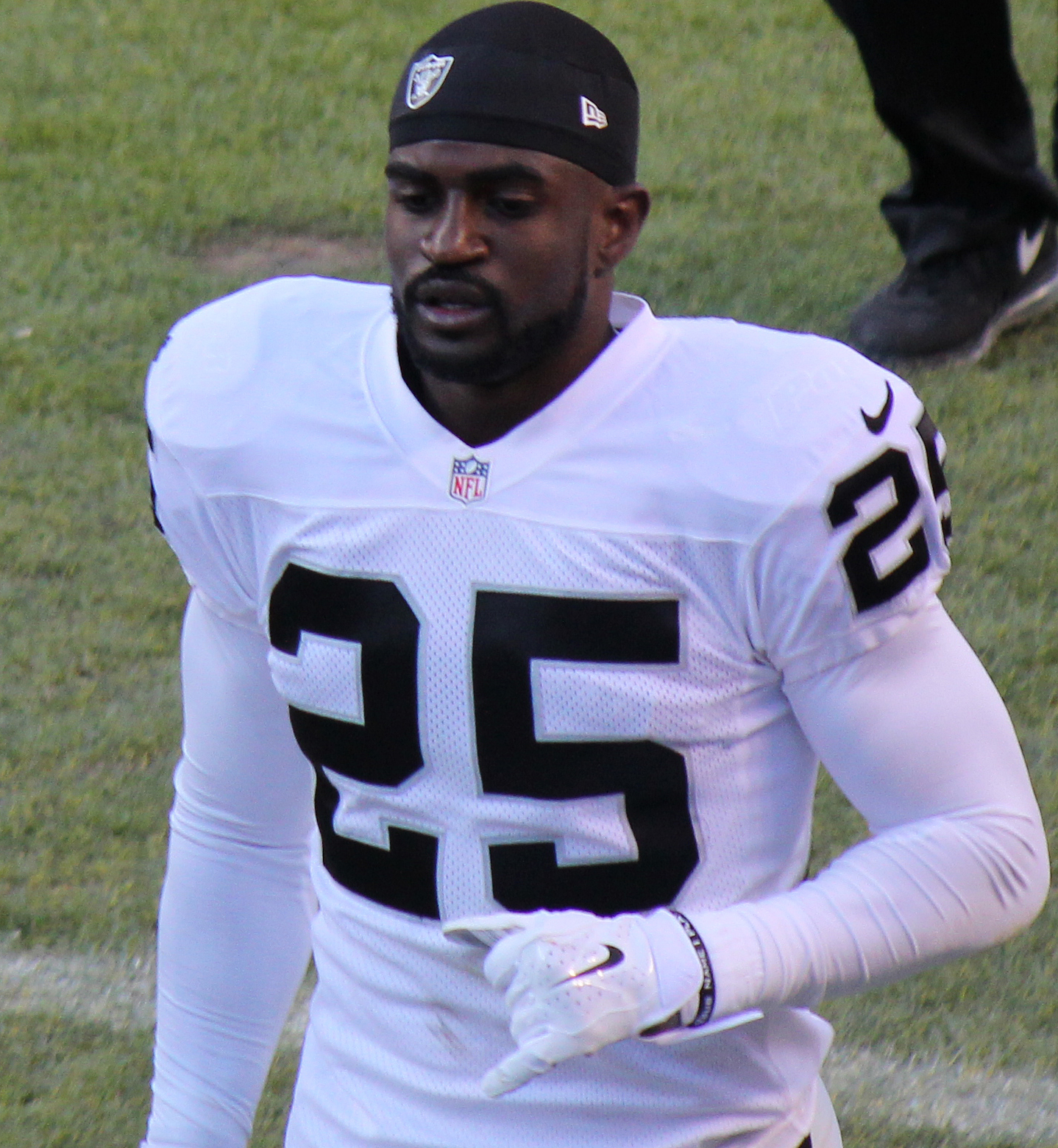
- Hayden with the Oakland Raiders in 2014

No. 25, 31, 14
- Position: Cornerback

Personal information
- Born: June 27, 1990; Houston, Texas, U.S.
- Died: November 11, 2023 (aged 33); Houston, Texas, U.S.
- Listed height: 5 ft 11 in (1.80 m)
- Listed weight: 190 lb (86 kg)

Career information
- High school: Elkins (Missouri City, Texas)
- College: Navarro (2009–2010); Houston (2011–2012)
- NFL draft: 2013: 1st round, 12th overall pick

Career history
- Oakland Raiders (2013–2016); Detroit Lions (2017); Jacksonville Jaguars (2018–2020); Washington Football Team (2021)

Awards and highlights
- First-team All-C-USA (2012); Second-team All-C-USA (2011); C-USA Newcomer of the Year (2011)

Career NFL statistics
- Total tackles: 328
- Sacks: 4.5
- Forced fumbles: 4
- Fumble recoveries: 3
- Pass deflections: 46
- Interceptions: 4
- Defensive touchdowns: 1
- Stats at Pro Football Reference

Derek Sherrard "D. J." Hayden Jr. (June 27, 1990 – November 11, 2023) was an American professional football player who was a cornerback in the National Football League (NFL). He played college football for the Houston Cougars and was selected by the Oakland Raiders in the first round of the 2013 NFL draft. Hayden was also a member of the Detroit Lions, Jacksonville Jaguars, and Washington Football Team.

== Early life ==
Hayden attended Elkins High School in Missouri City. He was teammates with future NFL offensive lineman Jake Matthews.

== College career ==
=== Navarro College ===
In 2009, Hayden played 10 games as a freshman at Navarro College and recorded 23 tackles and one for loss. In his sophomore year, he helped lead Navarro College to its second NJCAA National Football Championship in the 2010 season. During the year, he played in all 11 games and recorded 33 solo tackles. In addition, he had six pass breakups and three interceptions with one returned for a touchdown. He also ranked #41 on Rivals.com's Top 50 Junior College players list. Hayden committed to the University of Houston on June 8, 2010, and enrolled in the university in 2011; thereafter, he played for the Houston Cougars football team in 2011 and 2012.

=== Houston ===
==== Junior year ====
Hayden played very well the first year with the Cougars. He instantly became a shutdown corner for the Houston defense and he led the team with 11 passes broken up. He also recorded 52 solo tackles, two interceptions with one touchdown return, 1.0 sacks, and a team-leading five forced fumbles. The season ended in the 2012 TicketCity Bowl with a win against #23 Penn State.

==== Senior year ====
Hayden started the first nine games of the season in top form. Over that span, he had 61 total tackles, eight passes defended, and four interceptions. Two of those interceptions were returned for touchdowns.

During practice, before his team's tenth game, he suffered a season-ending and life-threatening injury. He collided with a safety in a passing drill where the safety's knee struck Hayden in his chest. The collision tore the inferior vena cava in his heart. The injury itself is most commonly seen in high-speed vehicle accidents, and the fatality rate is 95% due to the massive loss of blood. He told the media at the NFL Combine that after the accident he could not see much out of his left eye. It just went pitch black and he suddenly felt cold and sleepy.

Despite the injury, Hayden earned first-team All-Conference USA honors.

== Professional career ==
=== Pre-draft ===
Coming out of Houston, Hayden was a projected first or second-round pick by the majority of NFL draft experts and analysts. He received an invitation to the NFL Combine, but was unable to perform any physical drills because he was recovering from his surgery. On March 18, 2013, he participated at Houston's Pro Day and completed the majority of drills, missing the bench, short shuttle, and three-cone drill after injuring a hamstring on his second attempt at the 40-yard dash. Hayden was ranked as the top cornerback prospect in the draft by NFL analyst Mike Mayock, ranked the seventh cornerback in the draft by NFL analyst John Norris, and the fourth-best cornerback by NFLDraftScout.com.

Pre-draft measurables
| Height | Weight | Arm length | Hand span | 40-yard dash | 10-yard split | 20-yard split | Vertical jump | Broad jump |
|---|---|---|---|---|---|---|---|---|
| 5 ft 11 1/8 in (1.81 m) | 191 lb (87 kg) | 31 1/8 in (0.79 m) | 9 in (0.23 m) | 4.42 s | 1.57 s | 2.60 s | 33 1/2 in (0.85 m) | 10 ft 0 in (3.05 m) |
All values from Houston Pro Day/NFL Combine

=== Oakland Raiders ===
==== 2013 ====
The Oakland Raiders selected Hayden in the first round (12th overall) of the 2013 NFL draft. He was the second cornerback taken that year, after Dee Milliner. Hayden was the highest-selected defensive player from Houston since Wilson Whitley in 1977 until Ed Oliver was taken 9th overall in the 2019. During the Raiders' organized team activities (OTAs), Hayden was hospitalized with abdominal adhesions relating to his previous surgery and was able to have them removed.

On July 25, 2013, the Oakland Raiders signed Hayden to a four-year, a fully guaranteed $10.32 million contract with a signing bonus of $5.88 million.

Hayden competed with Mike Jenkins, Tracy Porter, Joselio Hanson, and Phillip Adams throughout training camp for the starting cornerback position. Head coach Dennis Allen named him the third cornerback on the Raiders' depth chart behind Jenkins and Porter to begin the regular season.

Hayden made his professional regular season debut during the Raiders' 17–21 loss to the Indianapolis Colts, finishing with three solo tackles. On September 23, 2013, Hayden earned his first career start and made two solo tackles during 21–37 loss to the Denver Broncos. On October 6, 2013, he made a season-high seven combined tackles, deflected a pass, and intercepted Philip Rivers for the first interception of his career during a 17–27 victory over the San Diego Chargers. The following week, he made two solo tackles and forced the first fumble of his career in a 24–7 loss to the Kansas City Chiefs.

On November 20, 2013, it was reported that Hayden would be placed on injured reserve for the remainder of his rookie season after undergoing sports hernia surgery. He finished his rookie campaign with 25 combined tackles (22 solo), two pass deflections, an interception, and a forced fumble in two starts and eight games.

==== 2014 ====
On August 26, 2014, the Oakland Raiders placed Hayden on the Physically Unable to Perform list for the first six games of the season due to a recurring foot injury.

On October 26, 2014, Hayden made his season debut during a 13–23 loss to the Cleveland Browns. The next week, he made seven combined tackles and a pass deflection in a 24–30 loss to the Seattle Seahawks. In Week 10, Hayden made his first start of the season and finished the game with three solo tackles and three pass deflections, and intercepted Denver Broncos' quarterback Peyton Manning during a 17–41 loss. In Week 16, he recorded a season-high six solo tackles and deflected a pass as the Raiders defeated the Buffalo Bills, 26–24. He finished 2014 with 47 combined tackles (42 solo), ten pass deflections, and an interception in eight starts and ten games.

==== 2015 ====
Hayden entered training camp slated as a starting cornerback after the Raiders chose not to re-sign Carlos Rogers and Tarell Brown. The Oakland Raiders' new head coach, Jack Del Rio, named Hayden the starting corner, along with T. J. Carrie, to begin the regular season.

Hayden started the Raiders' season-opening loss to the Cincinnati Bengals and collected four combined tackles. On October 25, 2015, he recorded ten solo tackles, deflected a pass, and intercepted San Diego Chargers' quarterback Philip Rivers in a 37–29 victory. The following week, he accumulated three combined tackles, deflected a pass, and sacked Geno Smith for the first sack of his career in a 34–20 victory over the New York Jets. In Week 9, Hayden made a career-high 13 combined tackles as the Raiders lost to the Pittsburgh Steelers, 35–38. He finished the season with a career-high 70 combined tackles (64 solo), eight pass deflections, a sack, and an interception in 16 games and 13 starts.

==== 2016 ====
On May 2, 2016, the Oakland Raiders announced that they would not be picking up Hayden's fifth-year option on his rookie contract.

Hayden competed with Sean Smith, David Amerson, and T. J. Carrie for a starting cornerback position. He was named the fourth cornerback on the Raiders' depth chart behind Smith, Amerson, and Carrie.

On October 2, 2016, he recorded a season-high six combined tackles and a pass deflection during a 28–27 victory over the Baltimore Ravens. In Week 7, he collected a season-high five solo tackles and made two pass deflections during a victory over the Jacksonville Jaguars. On November 6, 2016, Hayden made his first start of the season and.recorded two combined tackles and a pass deflection, as the Raiders defeated the Denver Broncos 30–20. He finished his final year in Oakland with 37 combined tackles (32 solo) and six pass deflections in 11 games and two starts.

On December 3, 2016, Hayden was placed on injured reserve with a hamstring injury.

=== Detroit Lions ===
On March 10, 2017, the Detroit Lions signed Hayden to a one-year, $3.75 million contract with $2.25 million guaranteed and a signing bonus of $1 million.

Hayden competed with Nevin Lawson, Teez Tabor, and Quandre Diggs throughout training camp for a starting cornerback position. He was named the Detroit Lions' third cornerback on their depth chart to begin the regular season, behind Darius Slay and Nevin Lawson.

In his debut with the Detroit Lions, Hayden recorded three solo tackles in a 35–23 win against the Arizona Cardinals. On September 24, 2017, he recorded a season-high seven combined tackles during a 26–30 loss to the Atlanta Falcons. On November 19, 2017, Hayden recovered the fumble after Chicago Bears' quarterback Mitchell Trubisky bobbled the snap. Hayden returned it for a 27-yard touchdown and also assisted on a tackle during the Lions' 27–24 victory.

=== Jacksonville Jaguars ===
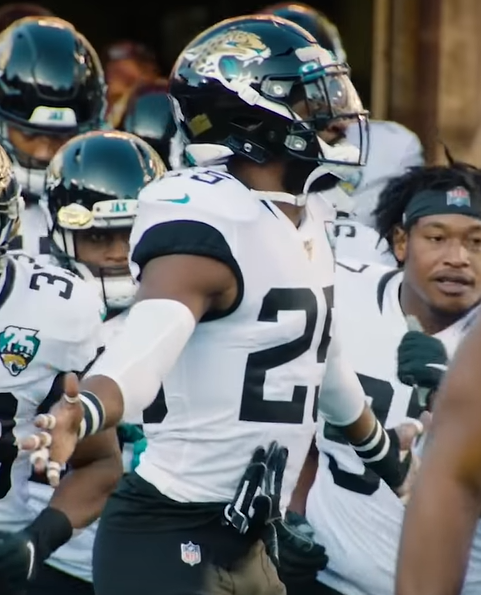
Hayden with the Jaguars in 2019

On March 14, 2018, Hayden signed a three-year contract with the Jacksonville Jaguars worth $19 million, with $9.5 million guaranteed.

Hayden was placed on the active/physically unable to perform list by the Jaguars at the start of training camp on August 1, 2020, and was moved back to the active roster three days later. He was placed on injured reserve on October 7, 2020, after suffering a hamstring injury in Week 4. He was activated on November 21, 2020, but placed back on injured reserve three days later after re-injuring his hamstring.

=== Washington Football Team ===
On December 18, 2021, Hayden signed with the Washington Football Team's practice squad. He signed a reserve/future contract with Washington on January 19, 2022, but was released on April 8, 2022.

== Career statistics ==
=== NFL ===
| Year | Team | Games | | Tackles | | | | Interceptions | | | | | | Fumbles | | | |
| Year | Team | GP | GS | Cmb | Solo | Ast | Sck | Int | Yds | Avg | Lng | TD | PD | FF | FR | Yds | TD |
|---|---|---|---|---|---|---|---|---|---|---|---|---|---|---|---|---|---|
| 2013 | OAK | 8 | 2 | 25 | 22 | 3 | 0.0 | 1 | 0 | 0.0 | 0 | 0 | 2 | 1 | 0 | 0 | 0 |
| 2014 | OAK | 10 | 8 | 47 | 42 | 5 | 0.0 | 1 | -1 | -1.0 | -1 | 0 | 10 | 0 | 0 | 0 | 0 |
| 2015 | OAK | 16 | 13 | 70 | 64 | 6 | 1.0 | 1 | 1 | 1.0 | 1 | 0 | 8 | 1 | 0 | 0 | 0 |
| 2016 | OAK | 11 | 2 | 37 | 32 | 5 | 0.0 | 0 | 0 | 0.0 | 0 | 0 | 6 | 1 | 0 | 0 | 0 |
| 2017 | DET | 16 | 1 | 44 | 36 | 8 | 0.5 | 0 | 0 | 0.0 | 0 | 0 | 9 | 0 | 2 | 27 | 1 |
| 2018 | JAX | 10 | 6 | 46 | 39 | 7 | 1.0 | 1 | 10 | 10.0 | 10 | 0 | 4 | 0 | 0 | 0 | 0 |
| 2019 | JAX | 15 | 8 | 41 | 32 | 9 | 2.0 | 0 | 0 | 0.0 | 0 | 0 | 6 | 1 | 1 | 0 | 0 |
| 2020 | JAX | 5 | 1 | 18 | 15 | 3 | 0.0 | 0 | 0 | 0.0 | 0 | 0 | 1 | 0 | 0 | 0 | 0 |
| 2021 | WAS | 1 | 0 | 0 | 0 | 0 | 0.0 | 0 | 0 | 0.0 | 0 | 0 | 0 | 0 | 0 | 0 | 0 |
| Career | | 92 | 41 | 328 | 282 | 46 | 4.5 | 4 | 10 | 2.5 | 10 | 0 | 46 | 4 | 2 | 27 | 1 |

=== College ===
| Season | GP | Tackles | | | | Interceptions | | | | Fumbles | |
| Season | GP | Solo | Ast | Cmb | Sck | Int | Yds | TD | PD | FR | FF |
|---|---|---|---|---|---|---|---|---|---|---|---|
| 2011 | 13 | 52 | 14 | 66 | 1.0 | 2 | 58 | 1 | 13 | 2 | 5 |
| 2012 | 9 | 38 | 23 | 61 | 0.0 | 4 | 171 | 2 | 12 | 1 | 1 |
| Career | 22 | 90 | 37 | 127 | 1.0 | 6 | 229 | 3 | 25 | 3 | 6 |

== Death ==
Hayden died as a result of a traffic collision in Houston, on November 11, 2023, at the age of 33. He and two former University of Houston players were among six fatalities when a car ran a red light at 2:00 am local time and struck the SUV in which Hayden was a passenger.
