= Marvin Jones (wide receiver) =

American football player (born 1990)

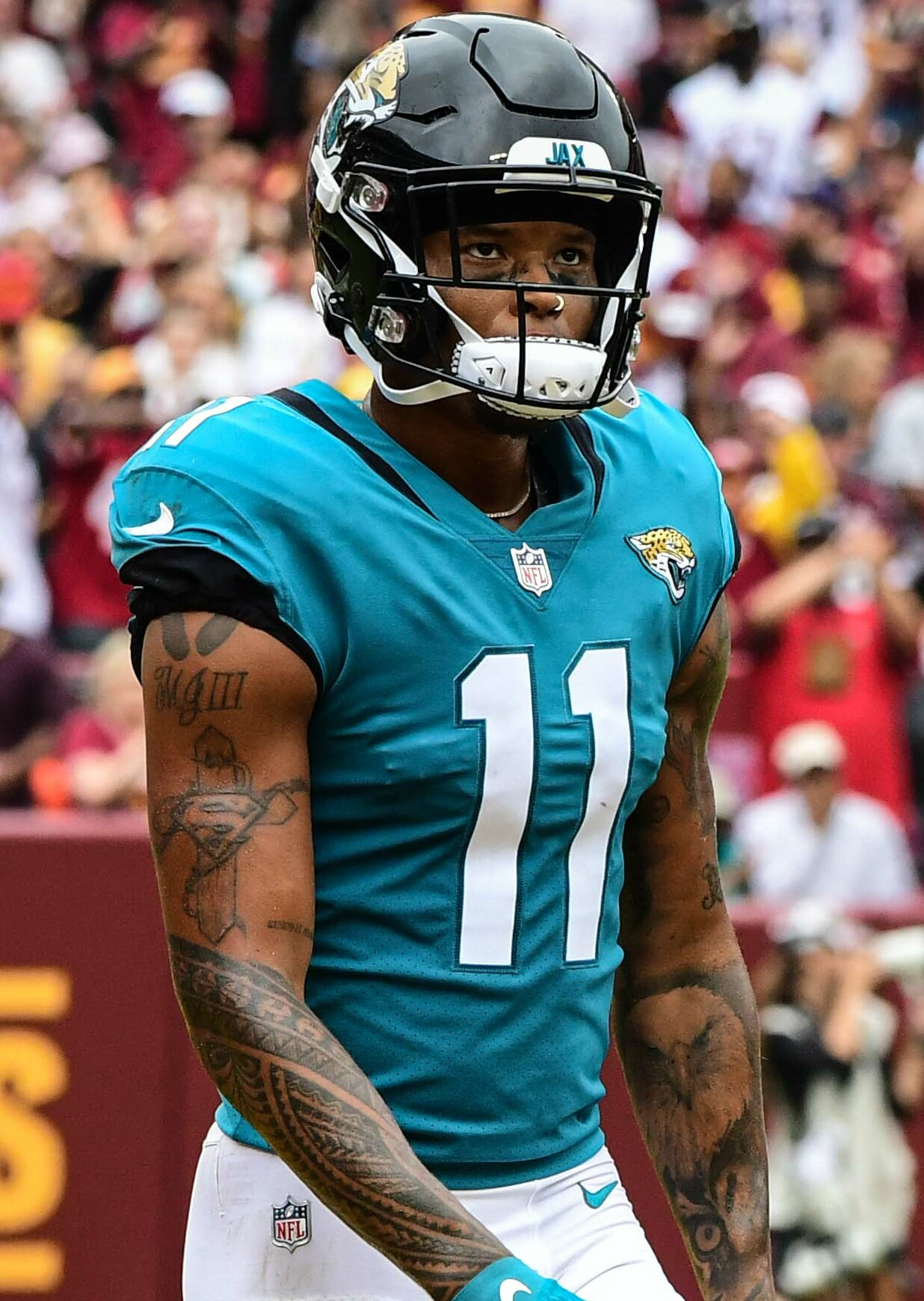
- Jones with the Jacksonville Jaguars in 2022

No. 82, 11, 0
- Position: Wide receiver

Personal information
- Born: March 12, 1990 (age 36); Long Beach, California, U.S.
- Listed height: 6 ft 2 in (1.88 m)
- Listed weight: 198 lb (90 kg)

Career information
- High school: Etiwanda (Rancho Cucamonga, California)
- College: California (2008–2011)
- NFL draft: 2012: 5th round, 166th overall pick

Career history
- Cincinnati Bengals (2012–2015); Detroit Lions (2016–2020); Jacksonville Jaguars (2021–2022); Detroit Lions (2023)

Career NFL statistics
- Receptions: 547
- Receiving yards: 7,421
- Receiving touchdowns: 58
- Stats at Pro Football Reference

Marvin Lewis Jones Jr. (born March 12, 1990) is an American former professional football player who was a wide receiver in the National Football League (NFL). He was selected by the Cincinnati Bengals in the fifth round of the 2012 NFL draft and has also played for the Detroit Lions and Jacksonville Jaguars. He played college football for the California Golden Bears.

== Early life ==
Jones attended Etiwanda High School, in Rancho Cucamonga, California. As a senior, he had 81 receptions for 1,040 yards and 10 touchdowns, leading the Eagles to a share of the Baseline League championship. He is Etiwanda's all-time leading receiver and was a Super Prep magazine All-American.

== College career ==
Jones attended the University of California, Berkeley, where he played from 2008 to 2011 under Golden Bears head coach Jeff Tedford.

On October 17, 2009, Jones had two receiving touchdowns against UCLA. On December 5, he had his first collegiate game going over the 100-yard mark against Washington. As a sophomore, he recorded 43 receptions for 651 yards and six touchdowns.

On September 17, 2010, Jones had 12 receptions for 161 yards against Nevada. As a junior, he recorded 50 receptions for 765 receiving yards and four touchdowns.

Jones started off his senior season strong with five receptions for 118 yards and two touchdowns against Fresno State. Two weeks later, against Presbyterian, he had seven receptions for 123 yards and a touchdown. As a senior, he caught 62 passes for 846 yards and three touchdowns for the 7–6 Bears and he was named Honorable Mention All-Pac-12. In his career, Jones started 38 of 43 games, recording 156 receptions for 2,270 yards and 13 touchdowns.

== Professional career ==
Pre-draft measurables
Height	Weight	Arm length	Hand span	Wingspan	40-yard dash	10-yard split	20-yard split	20-yard shuttle	Three-cone drill	Vertical jump	Broad jump	Bench press
6 ft 1 7/8 in (1.88 m)	199 lb (90 kg)	33 1/8 in (0.84 m)	10 1/4 in (0.26 m)	6 ft 6 3/4 in (2.00 m)	4.46 s	1.51 s	2.58 s	4.11 s	6.81 s	33.0 in (0.84 m)	9 ft 4 in (2.84 m)	22 reps
All values from NFL Combine

=== Cincinnati Bengals ===
==== 2012 ====
Jones was selected in the fifth round, 166th overall, by the Cincinnati Bengals in the 2012 NFL draft. He saw a limited role in the Bengals offense during his rookie season, starting in five of 11 games and catching 18 passes for 201 receiving yards and one touchdown, which came in Week 17 against the Baltimore Ravens.

==== 2013 ====
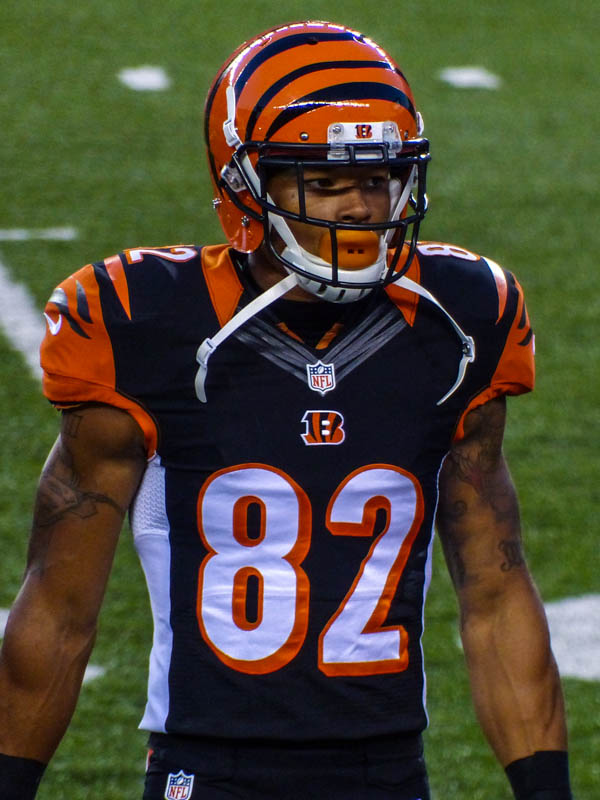
Jones with the Bengals in 2013.

In the 2013 season, he had a breakout performance in the team's 49–9 win over the New York Jets in Week 8, catching eight passes for 122 yards and a franchise record four touchdowns. He was named AFC Offensive Player of the Week for his game against the Jets. Jones finished the year with 51 receptions for 712 yards and ten touchdowns. In the 2013 season, his receiving yards and touchdown catches both ranked second on the team. In the Bengals 27–10 Wild Card Round loss against the San Diego Chargers, Jones set a franchise playoff record with 130 receiving yards on eight catches.

==== 2014 ====
Ankle and foot injuries kept Jones out of action for the entire 2014 season. He was due to return to the lineup in Week 5, but he re-injured his ankle in practice the week before and, on October 14, he was placed on injured reserve, ending his season.

==== 2015 ====
After missing all of the 2014 season, Jones returned in 2015 and caught 65 passes for 816 yards and four touchdowns. His first score since returning came in Week 2 in a 24–19 victory over the San Diego Chargers, the last team he had played in a meaningful game against (2013–14 playoffs). Four weeks later, Jones set a season-high mark with nine receptions and 95 yards to go along with a touchdown in the Bengals' 34–21 win over the Buffalo Bills.

Jones was held under 40 yards in each of the Bengals' last three games, all without original starting quarterback Andy Dalton. With A. J. McCarron under center, Jones recorded four receptions for 32 yards in Cincinnati's 18–16 Wild Card Round playoff loss to the Pittsburgh Steelers.

=== Detroit Lions (first stint) ===
==== 2016 ====
On March 11, 2016, the Detroit Lions signed Jones to a five-year, $40 million contract. In Week 2, against the Tennessee Titans, he had eight receptions for 118 yards in the 16–15 loss. In the following game, Jones had six receptions for 205 yards and two touchdowns in a 34–27 loss to the Green Bay Packers. In his first year with the Lions, Jones started 15 games, recording 55 catches for 930 yards and four touchdowns.

==== 2017 ====
On September 18, 2017, against the New York Giants on Monday Night Football, Jones recorded his first touchdown of the season, a 27-yard reception from Matthew Stafford, in the first quarter. In Week 8, against the Pittsburgh Steelers, he had six receptions for 128 yards in the 20–15 loss. In the next game, a 30–17 victory over the Green Bay Packers, he had seven receptions for 107 yards and two touchdowns. In Week 12, against the Minnesota Vikings, he had six receptions for 109 receiving yards and two touchdowns in the 30–23 loss. He finished the 2017 season with 61 receptions for a career-high 1,101 yards and nine touchdowns. He led the team in receiving yards and receiving touchdowns.

==== 2018 ====
In 2018, Jones played in nine games before suffering a knee injury in Week 10. He missed the next two games before being placed on injured reserve on November 26, 2018. He finished the season with 35 catches for 508 yards and five touchdowns.

==== 2019 ====
In Week 3 of the 2019 season against the Philadelphia Eagles, Jones caught six passes for 101 yards and one touchdown as the Lions won 27–24. During Week 7 against the Minnesota Vikings, Jones finished the game with 93 receiving yards and four touchdowns as the Lions lost 30–42. Jones became the first Lions player with four touchdown receptions in a game since Cloyce Box did so against the Baltimore Colts in 1950. In Week 9 against the Oakland Raiders, Jones caught eight passes for a season high 126 yards and a touchdown in the 31–24 loss. In Week 11 against the Dallas Cowboys, Jones caught four passes for 43 yards and two touchdowns in the 35–27 loss. On December 10, 2019, he was placed on injured reserve with an ankle injury. He finished the season with 62 catches for 779 yards and nine touchdowns through 13 games and 11 starts.

==== 2020 ====
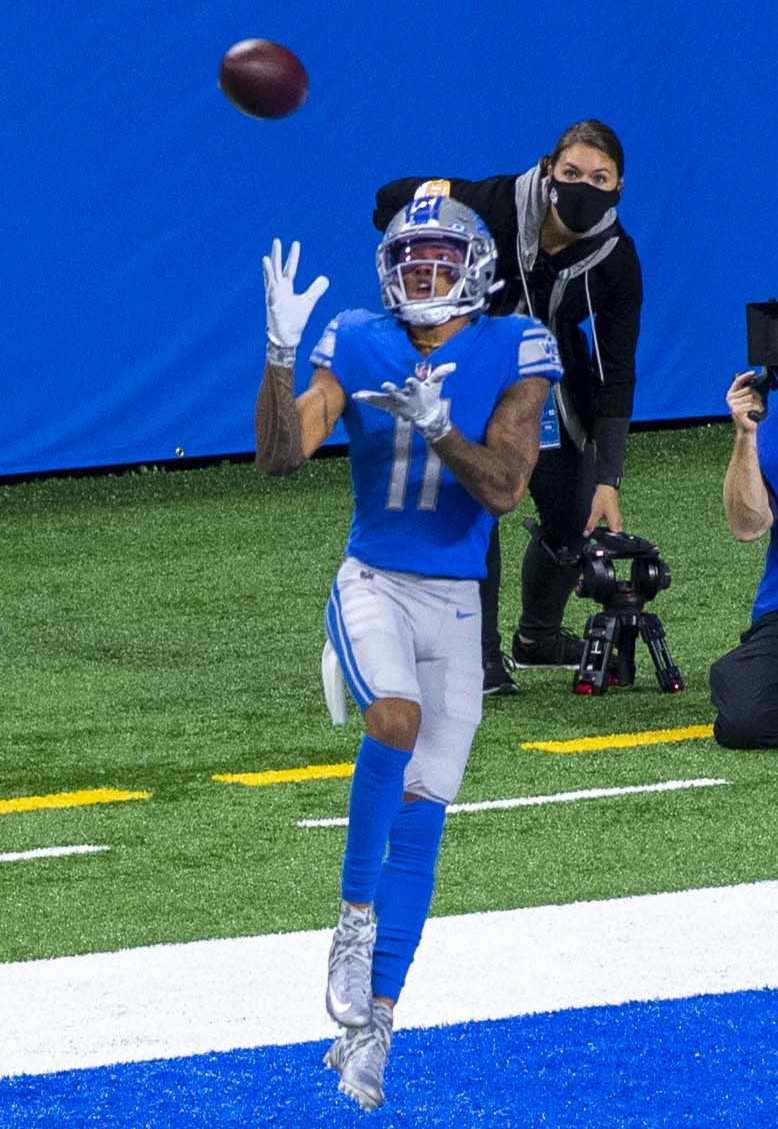
Jones scoring a touchdown against the Washington Football Team in 2020

In Week 8, Jones scored two receiving touchdowns in the 41–21 loss to the Indianapolis Colts. In Week 13, against the Chicago Bears, he had eight receptions for 116 yards and a touchdown in the 34–30 victory. In Week 15 against the Tennessee Titans, Jones recorded ten catches for 112 yards and a touchdown 46–25 loss. In Week 17 against the Minnesota Vikings, Jones recorded eight catches for 180 yards and two touchdowns during the 37–35 loss. In the 2020 season, Jones led the team with 76 receptions for 978 receiving yards and nine receiving touchdowns.

=== Jacksonville Jaguars ===
On March 17, 2021, Jones signed a two-year, $12.5 million contract with the Jacksonville Jaguars. In 2021, Jones was the Jaguars leading receiver with 73 catches for 832 yards and four touchdowns.

In the 2022 season, Jones recorded 46 receptions for 529 receiving yards and three receiving touchdowns. He scored a receiving touchdown in the Jaguars' Wild Card Round victory over the Los Angeles Chargers.

=== Detroit Lions (second stint) ===
On April 5, 2023, Jones signed a one-year, $3 million contract with the Lions. He was released on October 24, after announcing he would be stepping away from the team to deal with personal matters.

== Career statistics ==
=== NFL ===
==== Regular season ====
Year	Team	Games		Receiving							Fumbles	
Year	Team	GP	GS	Rec	Tgt	Yds	Avg	Lng	TD	FD	Fum	Lost
2012	CIN	11	5	18	32	201	11.2	23	1	11	0	0
2013	CIN	16	3	51	80	712	14.0	45	10	36	0	0
2014	CIN	0	0	Did not play due to injury								
2015	CIN	16	13	65	103	816	12.6	47	4	33	0	0
2016	DET	15	15	55	103	930	16.9	73	4	41	0	0
2017	DET	16	16	61	107	1,101	18.0	58	9	44	0	0
2018	DET	9	9	35	62	508	14.5	39	5	27	0	0
2019	DET	13	11	62	91	779	12.6	47	9	41	0	0
2020	DET	16	16	76	115	978	12.9	43	9	52	0	0
2021	JAX	17	16	73	120	832	11.4	33	4	42	0	0
2022	JAX	16	10	46	81	529	11.5	37	3	29	0	0
2023	DET	6	4	5	10	35	7.0	16	0	2	1	1
Career		151	118	547	904	7,421	13.6	73	58	359	1	1

==== Postseason ====
Year	Team	Games		Receiving					Fumbles	
Year	Team	GP	GS	Rec	Yds	Avg	Lng	TD	Fum	Lost
2012	CIN	1	1	3	34	11.3	15	0	0	0
2013	CIN	1	0	8	130	16.2	49	0	0	0
2015	CIN	1	1	4	32	8.0	13	0	0	0
2016	DET	1	1	4	81	20.3	30	0	0	0
2022	JAX	2	2	4	50	12.5	21	1	0	0
Career		6	5	23	327	14.2	49	1	0	0

=== College ===
Year	Team	GP	Receiving			
Year	Team	GP	Rec	Yds	Avg	TD
2008	California	5	1	8	8.0	0
2009	California	13	43	651	14.0	6
2010	California	12	50	765	12.6	4
2011	California	13	62	846	16.9	3
Total		43	156	2,270	14.5	13

== Personal life ==
Jones is married to Jazmyn Jones. They have six children together, Marvin III, Mareon, Murrell, Mya, Marlo, and Mila. Jones' youngest son, Marlo, died on December 27, 2019, at six months old.
