= Teez Tabor =

American football player (born 1995)

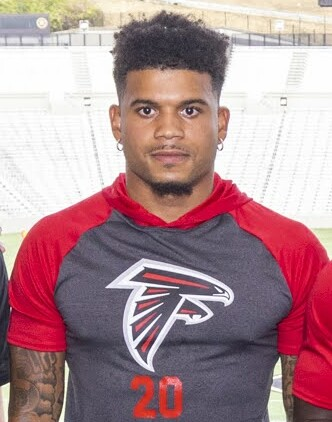
- Tabor with the Atlanta Falcons in 2022

No. 30, 31, 36, 37, 39
- Position: Safety

Personal information
- Born: December 31, 1995 (age 30); Washington, D.C., U.S.
- Listed height: 6 ft 0 in (1.83 m)
- Listed weight: 201 lb (91 kg)

Career information
- High school: Friendship Collegiate Academy (Washington, D.C.)
- College: Florida (2014–2016)
- NFL draft: 2017: 2nd round, 53rd overall pick

Career history
- Detroit Lions (2017–2018); San Francisco 49ers (2019)*; Chicago Bears (2020–2021); Atlanta Falcons (2022)*; Seattle Seahawks (2022); Indianapolis Colts (2023)*; Seattle Seahawks (2023); San Antonio Brahmas (2024)
- * Offseason or practice squad member only

Awards and highlights
- 2× First-team All-SEC (2015, 2016)

Career NFL statistics
- Total tackles: 59
- Stats at Pro Football Reference

Jalen "Teez" Tabor (born December 31, 1995) is an American former professional football player who was a safety in the National Football League (NFL). He played college football for the Florida Gators, and was selected in the second round of the 2017 NFL draft by the Detroit Lions.

== Early life ==
Tabor attended Friendship Collegiate Academy in Washington, D.C. Tabor was rated by Rivals.com as a five-star recruit. He originally committed to the University of Arizona to play college football, but he would later switch his commitment to the University of Florida.

== College career ==
As a true freshman with the Gators in 2014, Tabor played in all 12 games and had five starts under head coach Will Muschamp. He finished the season with 31 tackles, one interception and two sacks. Before the 2015 season, Tabor and the Gators would have a new head coach, Jim McElwain, after the departure of Muschamp. As a sophomore in 2015, he started nine of the 13 games and was a first-team All-Southeastern Conference (SEC) selection after recording 39 tackles, four interceptions, and one sack. As a junior in 2016, Tabor earned his second career first-team All-SEC selection. He would forgo his senior season and enter the 2017 NFL draft.

== Professional career ==
=== Pre-draft ===
Heading into the NFL Combine, the majority of NFL draft experts and analysts projected Tabor to be a first round pick. Tabor received an invitation to the NFL Combine, but put up unimpressive numbers for multiple running drills. He attended Florida's Pro Day and opted to have another attempt at the 40-yard dash, 20-yard dash, and 10-yard dash, but ended up putting slower times in all three. Tabor attended private workouts that were held by the Arizona Cardinals, New Orleans Saints, Dallas Cowboys, and Detroit Lions. His draft stock began to plummet and NFL Draft experts and analysts projected him to fall to the second or third round. Once considered a top five cornerback in the draft by some analysts, he was ranked as the eighth best cornerback in the draft by Sports Illustrated and was ranked the 12th best cornerback in the draft by NFLDraftScout.com and ESPN.

Pre-draft measurables
Height	Weight	Arm length	Hand span	Wingspan	40-yard dash	10-yard split	20-yard split	20-yard shuttle	Three-cone drill	Vertical jump	Broad jump	Bench press
6 ft 0 1/2 in (1.84 m)	199 lb (90 kg)	32 in (0.81 m)	8 5/8 in (0.22 m)	6 ft 4 5/8 in (1.95 m)	4.62 s	1.54 s	2.67 s	4.22 s	6.99 s	32.0 in (0.81 m)	10 ft 0 in (3.05 m)	9 reps
All values from NFL Combine/Florida's Pro Day

=== Detroit Lions ===
The Lions selected Tabor in the second round (53rd overall) of the 2017 NFL draft. He was the ninth cornerback to be selected in the 2017 NFL draft. He was reunited with Florida teammate Jarrad Davis, who the Lions selected 21st overall. Tabor was the fourth of eight Florida Gators to be selected in 2017.

On May 12, 2017, the Lions signed Tabor to a four-year, $4.82 million contract that included $2.33 million guaranteed and a signing bonus of $1.64 million.

He competed with Nevin Lawson and D. J. Hayden for the starting cornerback position. Tabor was named the Lions' fourth cornerback to begin his rookie season, behind veterans Darius Slay, Nevin Lawson, and D. J. Hayden. On October 1, 2017, Tabor made his professional regular season debut during the Lions' 14–7 win over the Minnesota Vikings. As a rookie, he appeared in ten games and made one start. In the 2018 season, he appeared in 12 games and started four.

On August 30, 2019, Tabor was released by the Lions.

=== San Francisco 49ers ===
On September 30, 2019, Tabor was signed to the practice squad of the San Francisco 49ers. He re-signed with the 49ers on February 5, 2020. Tabor was waived by San Francisco on July 6, with a non-football injury designation.

=== Chicago Bears ===
On December 23, 2020, Tabor signed with the practice squad of the Chicago Bears. On January 11, 2021, Tabor signed a reserve/futures contract with the Bears. He switched to safety after not having the requisite speed to play the cornerback position for the Lions.

On August 31, 2021, Tabor was waived by the Bears and re-signed to the practice squad the next day. He was promoted to the active roster on October 19. Tabor was placed on injured reserve on December 29.

As mostly a reserve, he played 34% of the team's snaps as a special teamer and 28% of them on defense. He played six games and made one start for the Bears in the 2021 season.

=== Atlanta Falcons ===
On March 17, 2022, Tabor signed with the Atlanta Falcons. He competed as a backup safety and cornerback - especially in the nickel - while also working on special teams. He was released on August 30 and re-signed to the practice squad.

=== Seattle Seahawks (first stint) ===
On September 15, 2022, the Seattle Seahawks signed Tabor off the Falcons practice squad. In the 2022 season, Tabor appeared in ten games and made one start for the Seahawks.

=== Indianapolis Colts ===
On August 14, 2023, Tabor signed with the Indianapolis Colts. He was released by Indianapolis on August 27, as a part of final roster cuts before the start of the regular season.

=== Seattle Seahawks (second stint) ===
On September 20, 2023, Tabor was signed to the Seattle Seahawks' practice squad. He was released by Seattle on October 12.

=== Houston Roughnecks ===
On December 15, 2023, Tabor was signed by the Houston Roughnecks of the XFL. This iteration of the Roughnecks folded when the Houston Gamblers became the new iteration of the Roughnecks after the XFL and USFL merged to create the United Football League (UFL).

=== San Antonio Brahmas ===
On January 5, 2024, Tabor was selected by the San Antonio Brahmas during the 2024 UFL dispersal draft. He was released by the Brahmas on April 23. Tabor was re-signed on May 2. He was waived by San Antonio on August 23.
