= Dez Stewart =

American football player (born 1993)

San Diego Strike Force
- Position: Wide receiver
- Roster status: Active

Personal information
- Born: April 18, 1993 (age 33); Owensboro, Kentucky, U.S.
- Listed height: 6 ft 2 in (1.88 m)
- Listed weight: 200 lb (91 kg)

Career information
- High school: Walnut Hills (Cincinnati, Ohio)
- College: Ohio Dominican
- NFL draft: 2016: undrafted

Career history
- Tampa Bay Buccaneers (2016)*; Washington Redskins (2016)*; Green Bay Packers (2016)*; Pittsburgh Steelers (2017)*; Detroit Lions (2017)*; Albany Empire (2019)*; Arizona Rattlers (2019); Green Bay Blizzard (2022); San Diego Strike Force (2023–present)
- * Offseason or practice squad member only
- Stats at Pro Football Reference

Dez Stewart (born April 18, 1993) is an American professional football wide receiver for the San Diego Strike Force of the Indoor Football League (IFL). He was signed by the Tampa Bay Buccaneers as an undrafted free agent after the 2016 NFL draft. He played college football for the Ohio Dominican Panthers.

== Professional career ==
=== Tampa Bay Buccaneers ===
On May 2, 2016, Stewart was signed by the Tampa Bay Buccaneers as an undrafted free agent. He was waived on May 12, 2016.

=== Washington Redskins ===
On July 18, 2016, Stewart was signed by the Washington Redskins. He was waived on August 27, 2016.

=== Green Bay Packers ===
On October 24, 2016, Stewart was signed to the Green Bay Packers' practice squad. He was released on December 2, 2016.

=== Pittsburgh Steelers ===
On January 24, 2017, Stewart was signed by the Pittsburgh Steelers to a reserve/future contract. He was waived/injured on May 5, 2017, and placed on injured reserve. On May 11, he was waived with an injury settlement.

=== Detroit Lions ===
On August 8, 2017, Stewart signed with the Detroit Lions. He was waived/injured on September 1, 2017, and placed on injured reserve. He was released on September 8, 2017.

=== Albany Empire ===
On March 4, 2019, Stewart was assigned to the Albany Empire. He was placed on recallable reassignment on April 12, 2019, and became a free agent.

=== Arizona Rattlers ===
In April, 2019, Stewart signed with the Arizona Rattlers of the Indoor Football League (IFL). Stewart finished the season with the Rattlers; they competed in the 2019 Indoor Football League Championship game against the Sioux Falls Storm. Stewart recovered a fumble during the game.

=== Green Bay Blizzard ===
On January 27, 2022, Stewart signed with the Green Bay Blizzard of the IFL. On October 12, 2022, Stewart was released by the Blizzard.

=== San Diego Strike Force ===
On October 19, 2022, Stewart signed with the San Diego Strike Force of the IFL.

== Personal life ==
Stewart's cousin Bo Smith, played a few seasons in the NFL and the CFL as a cornerback. Along with professional sports, Dez is an entrepreneur, owning a digital media business (Unorthodoxs Media, LLC), a clothing line (Humalien Clothing), and a social networking app he built and published (Fonebook App). He also writes and publishes music for the well known TikTok artist TuFou XoMu.
