= Jamal Agnew =

American football player (born 1995)

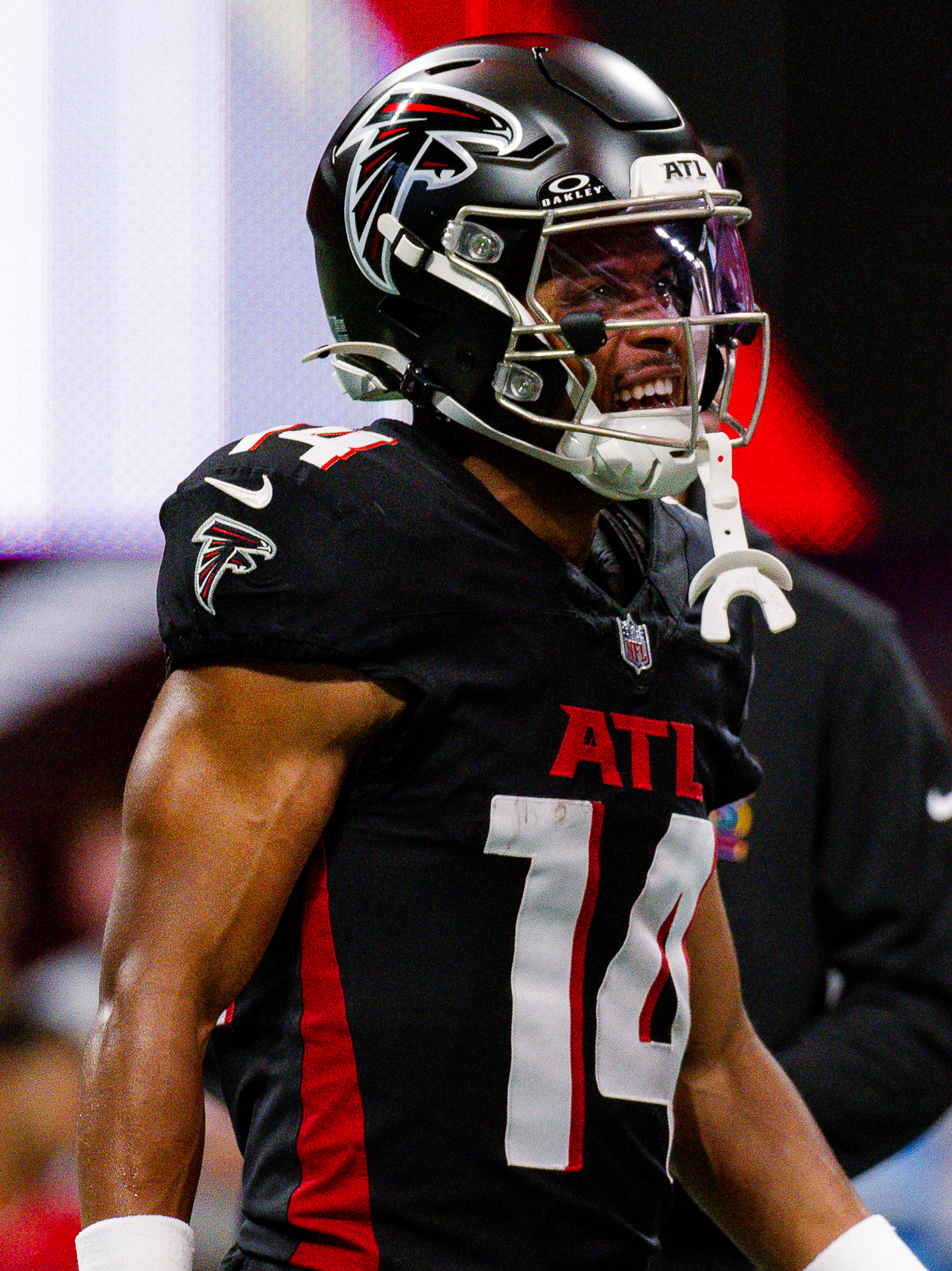
- Agnew with the Atlanta Falcons in 2025

Profile
- Positions: Wide receiver, return specialist

Personal information
- Born: April 3, 1995 (age 31); San Diego, California, U.S.
- Listed height: 5 ft 10 in (1.78 m)
- Listed weight: 190 lb (86 kg)

Career information
- High school: Point Loma (San Diego)
- College: San Diego (2013–2016)
- NFL draft: 2017: 5th round, 165th overall pick

Career history
- Detroit Lions (2017–2020); Jacksonville Jaguars (2021–2023); Pittsburgh Steelers (2024)*; Atlanta Falcons (2025); Washington Commanders (2025)*
- * Offseason or practice squad member only

Awards and highlights
- First-team All-Pro (2017) (Note: Selected as a Punt Returner); Pro Bowl (2022); NFL punt return yards leader (2017); PFWA All-Rookie Team (2017); NFL record: 109-yard return touchdown play (tied)

Career NFL statistics as of 2025
- Total tackles: 31
- Forced fumbles: 1
- Fumble recoveries: 7
- Rushing yards: 263
- Receptions: 77
- Receiving yards: 746
- Return yards: 5,247
- Total touchdowns: 12
- Stats at Pro Football Reference

Jamal Agnew (born April 3, 1995) is an American professional football wide receiver and return specialist. He played college football for the San Diego Toreros. On September 26, 2021, he tied the NFL record for the longest play with a 109 yard return off a missed field goal.

== Early life ==
Agnew attended and played high school football at Point Loma High School, which is to the west of the city. Jamal Agnew constantly stood out among his peers at Point Loma; however, due to his size, he was not offered a scholarship to any major NCAA Division I school.

== College career ==
Agnew attended and played college football for the San Diego Toreros, where he played cornerback and returned kicks. He finished his college career with 148 tackles and 11 interceptions. As a senior, he returned 17 punts for 216 yards.

== Professional career ==
Pre-draft measurables
Height	Weight	Arm length	Hand span	40-yard dash	10-yard split	20-yard split	20-yard shuttle	Three-cone drill	Vertical jump	Broad jump	Bench press
5 ft 9 1/2 in (1.77 m)	186 lb (84 kg)	29 1/2 in (0.75 m)	8 3/8 in (0.21 m)	4.34 s	1.54 s	2.44 s	4.27 s	6.92 s	36.0 in (0.91 m)	10 ft 5 in (3.18 m)	16 reps
All values from Pro Day

=== Detroit Lions ===
Agnew played in the 2017 NFLPA Collegiate Bowl. The Detroit Lions then selected Agnew in the fifth round (165th overall) of the 2017 NFL draft. Following 2008 draftee Josh Johnson, he became the second player in San Diego Torrero history to be drafted. On May 12, 2017, the Lions signed Agnew to a four-year, $2.65 million contract with a signing bonus of $258,364.

In Week 2 on Monday Night Football, Agnew scored his first NFL touchdown on an 88-yard punt return in the fourth quarter in a 24–10 win over the New York Giants, earning him National Football Conference Special Teams Player of the Week. In Week 6, against the New Orleans Saints, he recorded a 74-yard punt return touchdown in the fourth quarter. In Week 8, against the Pittsburgh Steelers, he recorded his first NFL reception, a 12-yard catch. He finished the 2017 season with 29 punt returns for 447 net yards and two punt return touchdowns to go along with 11 kickoff returns for 196 net yards. He led the NFL in punt return yards and punt return touchdowns. He earned first team All-Pro honors. He was named to the Pro Football Writers of America All-Rookie Team.

On October 15, 2018, Agnew was placed on injured reserve with a knee injury. He was activated off injured reserve on December 19, 2018. In six games, he had eight kickoff returns for 216 net yards and 12 punt returns for 57 net yards.

In Week 3 of the 2019 season against the Philadelphia Eagles, Agnew returned a kick for a 100-yard touchdown in the 27–24 win. In Week 16, against the Denver Broncos, he had a 64-yard punt return for a touchdown in the 27–17 loss.

On May 26, 2020, it was announced that Agnew would transition from cornerback to full time wide receiver. In the 2020 season, he had 13 receptions for 89 yards while having 28 kickoff returns for 783 net yards and 14 punt returns for 178 net yards and one punt return touchdown. The touchdown came in Week 16 against the Tampa Bay Buccaneers in a 47–7 loss.

=== Jacksonville Jaguars ===
On March 17, 2021, Agnew signed a three-year, $14.25 million contract with the Jacksonville Jaguars. In a Week 2 loss to the Broncos, Agnew scored his first touchdown for the Jaguars with a 102 yard kick-off return, setting a franchise record for longest kick return in the process. On September 26, 2021, the following week against the Arizona Cardinals, he scored another touchdown on a 109 yard return of a missed 68-yard field goal attempt, tying the NFL record for longest play with Antonio Cromartie and Cordarrelle Patterson, at the end of the first half in the 19–31 loss. He was named AFC Special Teams Player of the Month for September. He suffered a hip injury in Week 11 and was placed on injured reserve on November 22, 2021.

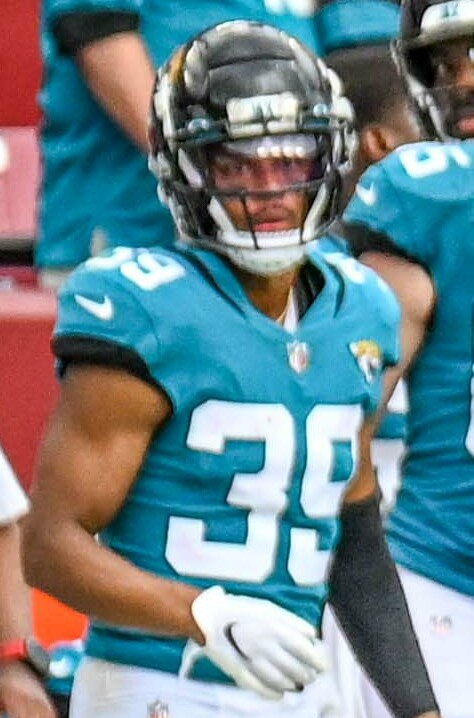
Agnew with the Jacksonville Jaguars in 2022

In 2022, Agnew played in 15 games, gaining 1,025 all-purpose yards and averaging 26 yards per kickoff return. In the Jaguars 31–30 win over the Los Angeles Chargers in the Wild Card Round of the playoffs, he returned four kickoffs for 134 yards. In the Jaguars' Divisional Round loss to the Kansas City Chiefs, Agnew returned three kickoffs for 131 yards, three punts for 23, and had seven yards from scrimmage. However, he committed a costly fourth-quarter fumble in the opposing red zone.

Agnew was named to 2023 Pro Bowl after Baltimore Ravens' kick returner Devin Duvernay was deemed unable to play due to injury.

On November 12, 2023, in a Week 10 game against the San Francisco 49ers, Agnew was tackled in the first quarter and suffered a rib and shoulder injury, sidelining him for the rest of the game. He was placed on the injured reserve on November 18. He was activated on December 16.

=== Pittsburgh Steelers ===
On November 12, 2024, Agnew was signed to the Pittsburgh Steelers' practice squad.

=== Atlanta Falcons ===
On March 20, 2025, Agnew signed with the Atlanta Falcons. He made 11 appearances for Atlanta, playing primarily on special teams, averaging 7.6 yards for punt returns and 24.7 yards for kick returns. Agnew was released by the Falcons on December 20.

=== Washington Commanders ===
On December 22, 2025, the Washington Commanders claimed Agnew off of waivers from the Falcons. However, he was waived the following day with a failed physical designation.

== Career statistics ==
Regular Season
Year	Team	Games		Receiving					Rushing					Punt returns					Kick returns				
Year	Team	GP	GS	Rec	Yds	Avg	Lng	TD	Att	Yds	Avg	Lng	TD	Ret	Yds	Avg	Lng	TD	Ret	Yds	Avg	Lng	TD
2017	DET	13	0	2	18	9.0	12	0	2	9	4.5	5	0	29	447	15.4	88	2	11	196	17.8	25	0
2018	DET	6	0	-	-	-	-	-	1	17	17.0	17	0	12	57	4.8	16	0	8	216	27.0	45	0
2019	DET	13	0	1	-2	-2	-2	0	1	9	9.0	9	0	19	175	9.2	64	1	17	454	26.7	100	1
2020	DET	14	2	13	89	6.8	20	0	6	33	5.5	11	0	14	178	12.7	74	1	28	783	28.0	71	0
2021	JAX	10	2	24	229	9.5	29	1	7	111	15.9	66	1	11	74	6.7	14	0	22	525	23.9	102	1
2022	JAX	15	0	23	187	8.1	24	3	12	86	7.2	30	0	25	205	8.2	22	0	21	547	26.0	54	0
2023	JAX	11	1	14	225	16.1	65	1	4	-2	-0.5	1	0	14	144	10.3	48	0	15	391	26.1	53	0
2025	ATL	11	0	-	-	-	-	-	-	-	-	-	-	15	114	7.1	17	0	30	741	24.7	45	0
Career		93	5	77	746	9.7	65	5	33	263	8.0	66	1	139	1,394	10.0	88	4	152	3,853	25.3	102	2
