= Tion Green =

American football player (born 1993)

No. 38
- Position: Running back

Personal information
- Born: December 14, 1993 (age 32); Sanford, Florida, U.S.
- Listed height: 6 ft 0 in (1.83 m)
- Listed weight: 221 lb (100 kg)

Career information
- High school: Lake Brantley (Altamonte Springs, Florida)
- College: Cincinnati
- NFL draft: 2017: undrafted

Career history
- Detroit Lions (2017); Indianapolis Colts (2018)*
- * Offseason or practice squad member only

Career NFL statistics
- Rushing attempts: 42
- Rushing yards: 165
- Rushing touchdowns: 2
- Receptions: 2
- Receiving yards: 14
- Stats at Pro Football Reference

Tion Green (born December 14, 1993) is an American former professional football player who was a running back in the National Football League (NFL). He played college football for the Cincinnati Bearcats, and signed with the Detroit Lions as an undrafted free agent in 2017.

== Early life ==
Green attended and played high school football at Lake Brantley High School.

== College career ==
Green attended and played college football for Cincinnati from 2012 to 2016. In the 2012 season, he had 16 carries for 70 yards and a touchdown. In the 2013 season, he had 91 carries for 412 yards and seven touchdowns. In the 2014 season, he had 28 carries for 118 yards and a touchdown. In the 2015 season, he had 151 carries for 729 yards and eight touchdowns. In the 2016 season, he had 159 carries for 743 yards and two touchdowns.

=== Collegiate statistics ===
Tion Green		Rushing				Receiving			
Year	G	Rush	Yds	Avg	TD	Rec	Yds	Avg	TD
2012	7	16	70	4.4	1	0	0	0.0	0
2013	11	91	412	4.5	7	2	12	6.0	0
2014	3	28	118	4.2	1	3	15	5.0	0
2015	13	151	729	4.8	8	13	101	7.8	0
2016	12	159	743	4.7	2	29	167	5.8	0
Career	46	445	2,072	4.7	19	47	295	6.3	0

== Professional career ==
=== Detroit Lions ===
Green signed with the Detroit Lions as an undrafted free agent on May 12, 2017.

On December 3, 2017, Green made his NFL debut against the Baltimore Ravens and had 11 carries for 51 yards and a touchdown. On Christmas Eve, against the Cincinnati Bengals, he scored his second touchdown. Overall, he finished his rookie season with 42 carries for 165 yards and two touchdowns.

On May 10, 2018, Green was waived by the Lions.

=== Indianapolis Colts ===
On August 14, 2018, Green signed with the Indianapolis Colts, but was waived six days later. He was re-signed on August 22, 2018, but waived again five days later.
