= 2016 Detroit Lions season =

NFL team season

- Owner: Martha Firestone Ford
- General manager: Bob Quinn
- Head coach: Jim Caldwell
- Home stadium: Ford Field

Results
- Record: 9–7
- Division place: 2nd NFC North
- Playoffs: Lost Wild Card Playoffs (at Seahawks) 6–26
- Pro Bowlers: Matt Prater, K

Uniform
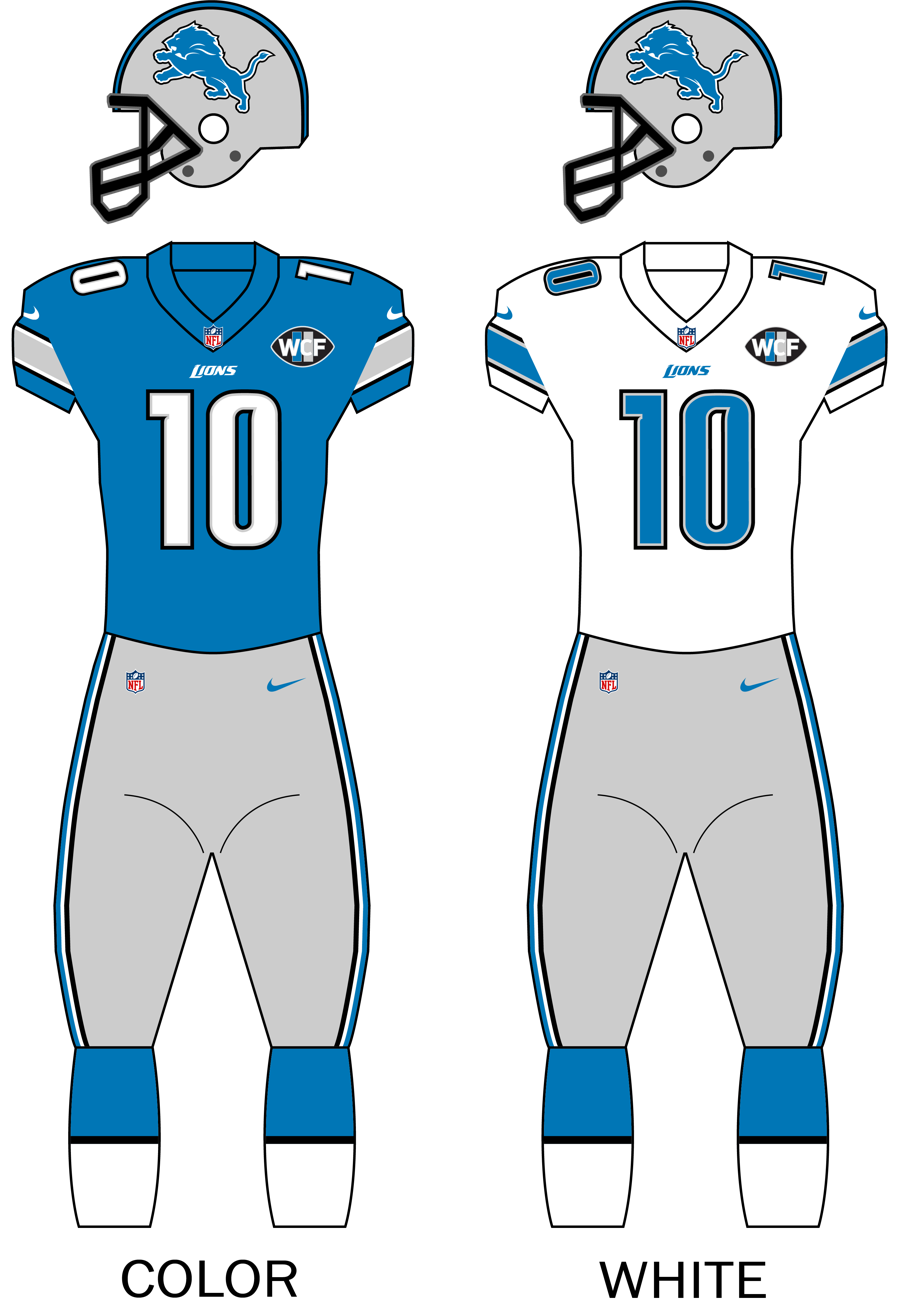

The 2016 season was the Detroit Lions' 87th in the National Football League (NFL), their 83rd as the Detroit Lions and their third under head coach Jim Caldwell. This was the first time since 2006 that Calvin Johnson was not on the opening day roster. On January 8, 2016, the Lions hired Bob Quinn as general manager. This was also the first season in over 40 years in which the Lions had an official cheerleading squad. The Lions improved upon their 7–9 record from 2015, and clinched a playoff spot for the first time since 2014—the Lions finished tied with the Tampa Bay Buccaneers for the last NFC playoff spot, but won the tiebreaker based on their record against common opponents. However, the Lions were defeated by the Seattle Seahawks in the Wild Card Round and extended their playoff losing streak to nine games, making it the longest losing streak in the playoffs ever. The Lions did not return to the playoffs until 2023, where they would put an end to nine consecutive postseason losses. This was also the last season the Lions would win their annual Thanksgiving Day game until the 2024 season.

== Offseason ==
=== Re-signings ===
Date	Player	Position	Contract	Source
March 4	Tyrunn Walker	Defensive tackle	1 year / $1.6 million	
March 9	Haloti Ngata	Defensive tackle	2 years / $12 million	
March 11	Crezdon Butler	Cornerback	1 year / $745,000	
March 11	Don Muhlbach	Long snapper	1 year / $1.05 million	
March 11	Dan Orlovsky	Quarterback	1 year / $1.065 million	
March 11	Tahir Whitehead	Linebacker	2 years / $8 million	
March 16	Tim Wright	Tight end	1 year / $675,000	
October 25	Josh Bynes	Linebacker	1 year / $760,000	

=== Arrivals ===
Date	Player	Position	Previous team	Contract	Source
February 11	Jerry Franklin	Linebacker	New Orleans Saints	1 year / $675,000	
February 12	Lamar Holmes	Offensive tackle	Atlanta Falcons	1 year / $760,000	
March 10	Tavon Wilson	Safety	New England Patriots	2 years / $2.2 million	
March 11	Johnson Bademosi	Cornerback	Cleveland Browns	2 years / $4.5 million	
March 11	Stefan Charles	Defensive tackle	Buffalo Bills	1 year / $1.75 million	
March 11	Marvin Jones	Wide receiver	Cincinnati Bengals	5 years / $40 million	
March 12	Rafael Bush	Safety	New Orleans Saints	1 year / $1.5 million	
March 21	Jeremy Kerley	Wide receiver	New York Jets	1 year / $850,000	
March 29	Darrin Walls	Cornerback	New York Jets	1 year / $840,000	
March 30	Geoff Schwartz	Guard	New York Giants	1 year / $840,000	
April 4	Wallace Gilberry	Defensive end	Cincinnati Bengals	1 year / $1.25 million	
April 4	Matthew Mulligan	Tight end	Buffalo Bills	1 year / $885,000	
April 5	Stevan Ridley	Running back	New York Jets	1 year / $840,000	
April 25	Kyle Christy	Punter	Florida	1 year / –	
May 2	Zaviar Gooden	Linebacker	Tennessee Titans	1 year / $600,000	
May 5	Andre Caldwell	Wide receiver	Denver Broncos	1 year / $885,000	
May 6	Adairius Barnes	Cornerback	Louisiana Tech	Undrafted FA	
May 6	Jace Billingsley	Wide receiver	Eastern Oregon	Undrafted FA	
May 6	Quinshad Davis	Wide receiver	North Carolina	Undrafted FA	
May 6	James DeLoach	Defensive end	Georgia	Undrafted FA	
May 6	Chase Farris	Guard	Ohio State	Undrafted FA	
May 6	Adam Fuehne	Tight end	Southern Illinois	Undrafted FA	
May 6	Deonte Gibson	Defensive end	Northwestern	Undrafted FA	
May 6	Jay Lee	Wide receiver	Baylor	Undrafted FA	
May 6	Charles Washington	Defensive back	Fresno State	Undrafted FA	
May 6	Ian Wells	Cornerback	Ohio	Undrafted FA	
May 6	Cole Wick	Tight end	Incarnate Word	Undrafted FA	
May 6	Andrew Zeller	Guard	Maryland	Undrafted FA	
May 6	Joe Dahl	Guard	Washington State	4 years / $2.58 million	
May 6	Taylor Decker	Tackle	Ohio State	4 years / $10.96 million	
May 6	Graham Glasgow	Center	Michigan	4 years / $3.032 million	
May 6	Miles Killebrew	Safety	Southern Utah	4 years / $2.918 million	
May 6	Jimmy Landes	Long snapper	Baylor	4 years / $2.44 million	
May 6	Jake Rudock	Quarterback	Michigan	4 years / $2.47 million	
May 6	Dwayne Washington	Running back	Washington	4 years / $2.415 million	
May 6	Antwione Williams	Linebacker	Georgia Southern	4 years / $2.54 million	
May 6	Anthony Zettel	Defensive tackle	Penn State	4 years / $2.46 million	
May 10	A'Shawn Robinson	Defensive tackle	Alabama	4 years / $5.233 million	
May 13	Louis Palmer	Defensive end	Central Michigan	3 years / $1.62 million	
May 31	Ben McCord	Tight end	Central Michigan	1 year / $450,000	
June 1	Dominick Jackson	Offensive lineman	Alabama	1 year / –	
June 2	Devon Bell	Placekicker	Mississippi State	1 year / $450,000	
June 7	Damian Copeland	Wide receiver	Jacksonville Jaguars	1 year / $450,000	
June 13	Keith Lewis	Defensive back	Kansas City Chiefs	1 year / $450,000	
June 13	Andre Roberts	Wide receiver	Washington Redskins	1 year / $760,000	
June 16	Orson Charles	Tight end	New Orleans Saints	1 year / $600,000	
July 21	Luke Marquardt	Tackle	New York Jets	1 year / $450,000	
July 28	Anquan Boldin	Wide receiver	San Francisco 49ers	1 year / $2.75 million	
August 1	Raphael Kirby	Linebacker	Miami	1 year / –	
August 5	Chi Chi Ariguzo	Linebacker	San Diego Chargers	1 year / $475,000	
August 8	Alex Chisum	Wide receiver	Cincinnati	1 year / –	
August 10	Rashaad Reynolds	Cornerback	Jacksonville Jaguars	1 year / –	
August 15	Andrew Quarless	Tight end	Green Bay Packers	1 year / $760,000	
August 15	Dominique Tovell	Linebacker	Atlanta Falcons	3 years / $1.62 million	
August 17	Lemuel Jeanpierre	Center	Seattle Seahawks	1 year / $760,000	
August 23	Brandon McGee	Cornerback	Dallas Cowboys	1 year / –	
September 21	Aaron Dobson	Wide receiver	New England Patriots	1 year / –	
October 11	Justin Forsett	Running back	Baltimore Ravens	1 year / $885,000	
December 6	Joique Bell	Running back	Chicago Bears		
December 6	Asa Jackson	Cornerback	Baltimore Ravens		

=== Departures ===
Date	Player	Position	Note	New Team	Source
February 16	Joique Bell	Running back	Released	Chicago Bears	
February 16	Rashean Mathis	Cornerback	Retired	—N/a	
February 19	C. J. Wilson	Defensive tackle	Released	New Orleans Saints	
March 8	Calvin Johnson	Wide receiver	Retired	—N/a	
May 5	Darren Keyton	Center	Released		
May 13	Lamar Holmes	Offensive tackle	Released		
July 5	Stephen Tulloch	Linebacker	Released	Philadelphia Eagles	
August 22	Andre Caldwell	Wide receiver	Released		
August 25	Stevan Ridley	Running back	Released	Indianapolis Colts	

=== Trades ===
- On May 9, the Lions traded a conditional seventh-round draft pick in the 2017 NFL draft to the New England Patriots in exchange for linebacker Jon Bostic.
- On August 29, the Lions traded wide receiver Jeremy Kerley to the San Francisco 49ers in exchange for offensive guard Brandon Thomas.
- On October 25, the Lions traded linebacker Kyle Van Noy and a seventh-round draft pick in the 2017 NFL draft to the New England Patriots, in exchange for a sixth-round draft pick in 2017.

=== Draft ===
2016 Detroit Lions draft
Round	Pick	Player	Position	College	Notes
1	16	Taylor Decker *	OT	Ohio State	
2	46	A'Shawn Robinson	DT	Alabama	
3	95	Graham Glasgow	C	Michigan	Compensatory
4	111	Miles Killebrew *	S	Southern Utah	
5	151	Joe Dahl	OG	Washington State	
5	169	Antwione Williams	LB	Georgia Southern	Pick from DEN
6	191	Jake Rudock	QB	Michigan	
6	202	Anthony Zettel	DT	Penn State	Pick from SEA
6	210	Jimmy Landes	LS	Baylor	Compensatory
7	236	Dwayne Washington	RB	Washington	
Made roster † Pro Football Hall of Fame * Made at least one Pro Bowl during career

Notes

- The Lions traded their original third-round selection (number 77 overall) to the Philadelphia Eagles in exchange for the Eagles' 2015 fourth-round selection (number 111 overall).
- The Lions acquired an additional fifth-round selection (number 169 overall) as part of a trade that sent their 2015 first-round selection to the Denver Broncos.
- The Lions acquired an additional sixth-round selection (number 202 overall) in a trade that sent cornerback Mohammed Seisay to the Seattle Seahawks.

== Final roster ==
2016 Detroit Lions roster
Quarterbacks (QB): 9 Matthew Stafford; 8 Dan Orlovsky; 14 Jake Rudock; Running backs (RB): 44 Joique Bell; 46 Michael Burton FB; 36 Dwayne Washington; 34 Zach Zenner; Wide receivers (WR): 80 Anquan Boldin; 11 Marvin Jones; 13 T. J. Jones; 12 Andre Roberts; 15 Golden Tate; 16 Jace Billingsley; Tight ends (TE): 85 Eric Ebron; 84 Clay Harbor; 82 Matthew Mulligan	Offensive linemen (OL): 66 Joe Dahl G; 68 Taylor Decker T; 60 Graham Glasgow G/C; 77 Cornelius Lucas T; 71 Riley Reiff T; 70 Corey Robinson T; 64 Travis Swanson C; 72 Laken Tomlinson G; 75 Larry Warford G; Defensive linemen (DL): 94 Ezekiel Ansah DE; 61 Kerry Hyder DE; 92 Haloti Ngata DT; 91 A'Shawn Robinson DT; 98 Devin Taylor DE; 99 Khyri Thornton DT; 93 Tyrunn Walker DT; 69 Anthony Zettel DE	Linebackers (LB): 50 Thurston Armbrister OLB; 57 Josh Bynes OLB; 51 Brandon Copeland OLB; 54 DeAndre Levy OLB; 59 Tahir Whitehead MLB; 52 Antwione Williams OLB; Defensive backs (DB): 29 Johnson Bademosi CB; 31 Rafael Bush SS; 41 Crezdon Butler CB; 26 Don Carey FS; 33 Alex Carter CB; 30 Asa Jackson CB; 35 Miles Killebrew SS; 24 Nevin Lawson CB; 27 Glover Quin FS; 23 Darius Slay CB; 32 Tavon Wilson SS; Special teams (ST): 6 Sam Martin P; 5 Matt Prater K; 48 Don Muhlbach LS	Practice squad: 49 Kennard Backman TE; 38 Adairius Barnes CB; 39 Mike James RB; 86 Khari Lee TE; 58 Steve Longa MLB; 17 Rashad Ross WR; 74 Matt Rotheram G; 63 Brandon Thomas G; 19 Andrew Turzilli WR; 45 Charles Washington CB; Reserve: 21 Ameer Abdullah RB (IR); 55 Jon Bostic MLB (IR); 97 Armonty Bryant DE (IR); 96 Stefan Charles DT (IR); 28 Quandre Diggs CB (IR); 42 Jimmy Landes LS (IR); 25 Theo Riddick RB (IR); 18 Ryan Spadola WR (IR); 40 Ian Wells CB (IR); 89 Cole Wick TE (IR); 83 Tim Wright TE (IR); Rookies in italics 53 active, 11 reserve, 10 practice squad

== Schedule ==
=== Preseason ===
Week	Date	Opponent	Result	Record	Venue	Recap
1	August 12	at Pittsburgh Steelers	**W** 30–17	1–0	Heinz Field	Recap
2	August 18	Cincinnati Bengals	**L** 14–30	1–1	Ford Field	Recap
3	August 27	at Baltimore Ravens	**L** 9–30	1–2	M&T Bank Stadium	Recap
4	September 1	Buffalo Bills	**W** 31–0	2–2	Ford Field	Recap

=== Regular season ===
Week	Date	Opponent	Result	Record	Venue	Recap
1	September 11	at Indianapolis Colts	**W** 39–35	1–0	Lucas Oil Stadium	Recap
2	September 18	Tennessee Titans	**L** 15–16	1–1	Ford Field	Recap
3	September 25	at **Green Bay Packers**	**L** 27–34	1–2	Lambeau Field	Recap
4	October 2	at **Chicago Bears**	**L** 14–17	1–3	Soldier Field	Recap
5	October 9	Philadelphia Eagles	**W** 24–23	2–3	Ford Field	Recap
6	October 16	Los Angeles Rams	**W** 31–28	3–3	Ford Field	Recap
7	October 23	Washington Redskins	**W** 20–17	4–3	Ford Field	Recap
8	October 30	at Houston Texans	**L** 13–20	4–4	NRG Stadium	Recap
9	November 6	at **Minnesota Vikings**	**W** 22–16 (OT)	5–4	U.S. Bank Stadium	Recap
10	Bye					
11	November 20	Jacksonville Jaguars	**W** 26–19	6–4	Ford Field	Recap
12	November 24	**Minnesota Vikings**	**W** 16–13	7–4	Ford Field	Recap
13	December 4	at New Orleans Saints	**W** 28–13	8–4	Mercedes-Benz Superdome	Recap
14	December 11	**Chicago Bears**	**W** 20–17	9–4	Ford Field	Recap
15	December 18	at New York Giants	**L** 6–17	9–5	MetLife Stadium	Recap
16	December 26	at Dallas Cowboys	**L** 21–42	9–6	AT&T Stadium	Recap
17	January 1	**Green Bay Packers**	**L** 24–31	9–7	Ford Field	Recap

Note: Intra-division opponents are in bold text.

=== Postseason ===
Round	Date	Opponent (seed)	Result	Record	Venue	Recap
Wild Card	January 7, 2017	at Seattle Seahawks (3)	**L** 6–26	0–1	CenturyLink Field	Recap

== Game summaries ==
=== Regular season ===
==== Week 1: at Indianapolis Colts ====
Week One: Detroit Lions at Indianapolis Colts – Game summary

Quarter	1	2	3	4	Total
Lions	7	14	7	11	39
Colts	0	10	8	17	35

at Lucas Oil Stadium, Indianapolis, Indiana

- Date: September 11
- Game time: 4:25 p.m. EDT
- Game weather: 76 °F (24 °C), sunny (retractable roof open)
- Game attendance: 65,566
- Referee: Ed Hochuli
- TV announcers (Fox): Kenny Albert, Daryl Johnston and Laura Okmin
- Recap, Gamebook

Game information

First quarter

- DET – Theo Riddick 21-yard run (Matt Prater kick), 4:43. Lions 7–0. Drive: 9 plays, 80 yards, 4:23.

Second quarter

- DET – Dwayne Washington 1-yard run (Matt Prater kick), 9:11. Lions 14–0. Drive: 15 plays, 82 yards, 7:00.
- IND – Adam Vinatieri 50-yard field goal, 4:50. Lions 14–3. Drive: 8 plays, 47 yards, 4:21.
- DET – Eric Ebron 6-yard pass from Matthew Stafford (Matt Prater kick), 1:37. Lions 21–3. Drive: 8 plays, 75 yards, 3:13.
- IND – Donte Moncrief 2-yard pass from Andrew Luck (Adam Vinatieri kick), 0:05. Lions 21–10. Drive: 8 plays, 75 yards, 1:32.

Third quarter

- IND – Dwayne Allen 19-yard pass from Andrew Luck (Andrew Luck–Dwayne Allen pass), 8:41. Lions 21–18. Drive: 9 plays, 85 yards, 4:00.
- DET – Ameer Abdullah 11-yard pass from Matthew Stafford (Matt Prater kick), 2:20. Lions 28–18. Drive: 7 plays, 71 yards, 3:36.

Fourth quarter

- IND – Adam Vinatieri 40-yard field goal, 14:17. Lions 28–21. Drive: 10 plays, 53 yards, 3:03.
- IND – Jack Doyle 16-yard pass from Andrew Luck (Adam Vinatieri kick), 8:19. Tied 28–28. Drive: 9 plays, 94 yards, 4:19.
- DET – Theo Riddick 13-yard pass from Matthew Stafford (kick failed, wide right), 4:04. Lions 34–28. Drive: 8 plays, 75 yards, 4:15.
- IND – Jack Doyle 6-yard pass from Andrew Luck (Adam Vinatieri kick), 0:37. Colts 35–34. Drive: 8 plays, 75 yards, 3:27.
- DET – Matt Prater 43-yard field goal, 0:04. Lions 37–35. Drive: 5 plays, 50 yards, 0:33.
- DET – Penalty on T. Y. Hilton enforced in the end zone for a safety, 0:00. Lions 39–35.

Top passers

- DET – Matthew Stafford – 31/39, 340 yards, 3 TD
- IND – Andrew Luck – 31/47, 385 yards, 4 TD

Top rushers

- DET – Ameer Abdullah – 12 rushes, 63 yards
- IND – Frank Gore – 14 rushes, 59 yards

Top receivers

- DET – Marvin Jones – 4 receptions, 85 yards
- IND – Phillip Dorsett – 4 receptions, 94 yards

The Lions opened the regular season on the road against the Indianapolis Colts, and came away with a close victory. The Lions jumped out to a 14–0 lead before Indianapolis got on the board. Theo Riddick had a 21-yard touchdown run on the Lions' opening drive, and rookie running back Dwayne Washington scored on a 1-yard run early in the second quarter. The Colts got on the board with a 50-yard Adam Vinatieri field goal, but the Lions went up 21–3 on its next possession when Matthew Stafford hit Eric Ebron for a six-yard touchdown pass. Indianapolis closed to 21–10 near the end of the first half after Andrew Luck tossed a two-yard touchdown pass to Donte Moncrief. The Colts got within a field goal early in the third quarter with a 19-yard scoring strike from Luck to Dwayne Allen and a successful 2-point conversion. On Detroit's next drive, Stafford connected with Ameer Abdullah on an 11-yard touchdown pass to put his team back up, 28–18. The Colts scored the next ten points early in the fourth quarter on a 40-yard Vinatieri field goal and a 16-yard scoring pass from Luck to Jack Doyle, knotting the game at 28. The Lions regained the lead on a 13-yard touchdown pass from Stafford to Riddick, but Matt Prater missed the extra point. That allowed Indianapolis to take a 35–34 lead on its next possession, when Luck again connected with Doyle, this time on a six-yard touchdown pass. Detroit got the ball back with 37 seconds left in the game, and on three plays moved into range for Matt Prater's go-ahead 43-yard field goal with four seconds on the clock. The Lions earned a safety on the final play of the game when the Colts were called for an illegal forward pass in the end zone, making the final score 39–35. This was the first time the Lions defeated the Colts since 1997. This game was head coach Jim Caldwell's return to Indianapolis; he was the Colts' assistant head coach/quarterbacks coach from 2002 to 2008, and their head coach from 2009 to 2011.

==== Week 2: vs. Tennessee Titans ====
Week Two: Tennessee Titans at Detroit Lions – Game summary

Quarter	1	2	3	4	Total
Titans	0	3	0	13	16
Lions	9	3	3	0	15

at Ford Field, Detroit, Michigan

- Date: September 18
- Game time: 1:00 pm. EDT
- Game weather: Played indoors (dome stadium)
- Game attendance: 58,466
- Referee: Brad Allen
- TV announcers (CBS): Andrew Catalon, Steve Beuerlein and Steve Tasker
- Recap, Gamebook

Game information

First quarter

- DET – DeMarco Murray tackled in end zone by Devin Taylor for a safety, 7:16. Lions 2–0.
- DET – Anquan Boldin 24-yard pass from Matthew Stafford (Matt Prater kick), 4:15. Lions 9–0. Drive: 8 plays, 79 yards, 3:01.

Second quarter

- TEN – Ryan Succop 46-yard field goal, 12:03. Lions 9–3. Drive: 14 plays, 47 yards, 7:12.
- DET – Matt Prater 42-yard field goal, 1:04. Lions 12–3. Drive: 13 plays, 75 yards, 3:58.

Third quarter

- DET – Matt Prater 27-yard field goal, 1:40. Lions 15–3. Drive: 14 plays, 63 yards, 7:10.

Fourth quarter

- TEN – Delanie Walker 30-yard pass from Marcus Mariota (Ryan Succop kick), 14:54. Lions 15–10. Drive: 5 plays, 75 yards, 1:46.
- TEN – Andre Johnson 9-yard pass from Marcus Mariota (pass failed), 1:13. Titans 16–15. Drive: 13 plays, 83 yards, 5:51.

Top passers

- TEN – Marcus Mariota – 25/33, 238 yards, 2 TD, INT
- DET – Matthew Stafford – 22/40, 260 yards, TD, INT

Top rushers

- TEN – DeMarco Murray – 12 rushes, 89 yards
- DET – Ameer Abdullah – 6 rushes, 38 yards

Top receivers

- TEN – Delanie Walker – 6 receptions, 83 yards, TD
- DET – Marvin Jones – 8 receptions, 118 yards

For their home opener, the Lions hosted the Tennessee Titans. The Lions had led for most of the game, accumulating 12 points in the first half with an end zone tackle of DeMarco Murray by Devin Taylor for a safety, a 24-yard touchdown catch by Anquan Boldin from Matthew Stafford, and a 42-yard Matt Prater field goal, while holding the Titans to only a 46-yard field goal by Ryan Succop before the break. Detroit lost steam after intermission and only managed to score a single 27-yard Prater field goal in the third quarter. After Tennessee gained a 16–15 lead late in the fourth quarter on touchdown passes from Marcus Mariota to Delanie Walker and Andre Johnson, from 30 and nine-yards respectively, an attempted Detroit comeback failed when Matthew Stafford was picked off by Perrish Cox in the closing seconds, giving the Lions their first loss of the season. The game was marred by 29 penalties, 17 on the Lions. Detroit had three touchdowns (two on the same drive) called back due to penalties.

==== Week 3: at Green Bay Packers ====
Week Three: Detroit Lions at Green Bay Packers – Game summary

Quarter	1	2	3	4	Total
Lions	3	7	7	10	27
Packers	14	17	3	0	34

at Lambeau Field, Green Bay, Wisconsin

- Date: September 25
- Game time: 1:00 pm. EDT/12:00 p.m. CDT
- Game weather: 72 °F (22 °C), clear
- Game attendance: 78,411
- Referee: Carl Cheffers
- TV announcers (Fox): Thom Brennaman, Charles Davis and Peter Schrager
- Recap, Gamebook

Game information

First quarter

- GB – Davante Adams 14-yard pass from Aaron Rodgers (Mason Crosby kick), 11:27. Packers 7–0. Drive: 8 plays, 75 yards, 3:38.
- DET – Matt Prater 42-yard field goal, 2:49. Packers 7–3. Drive: 15 plays, 52 yards, 8:37.
- GB – Jordy Nelson 8-yard pass from Aaron Rodgers (Mason Crosby kick), 1:07. Packers 14–3. Drive: 4 plays, 60 yards, 1:44.

Second quarter

- GB – Richard Rodgers 2-yard pass from Aaron Rodgers (Mason Crosby kick), 14:51. Packers 21–3. Drive: 2 plays, 67 yards, 0:47.
- GB – Mason Crosby 36-yard field goal, 10:45. Packers 24–3. Drive: 4 plays, 7 yards, 0:59.
- GB – Jordy Nelson 17-yard pass from Aaron Rodgers (Mason Crosby kick), 1:14. Packers 31–3. Drive: 7 plays, 67 yards, 3:53.
- DET – Marvin Jones 73-yard pass from Matthew Stafford (Matt Prater kick), 0:42. Packers 31–10. Drive: 2 plays, 75 yards, 0:38.

Third quarter

- DET – Anquan Boldin 2-yard pass from Matthew Stafford (Matt Prater kick), 8:26. Packers 31–17. Drive: 12 plays, 77 yards, 6:37.
- GB – Mason Crosby 46-yard field goal, 3:18. Packers 34–17. Drive: 9 plays, 47 yards, 5:09.

Fourth quarter

- DET – Matt Prater 50-yard field goal, 12:35. Packers 34–20. Drive: 10 plays, 50 yards, 5:42.
- DET – Marvin Jones 35-yard pass from Matthew Stafford (Matt Prater kick), 3:40. Packers 34–27. Drive: 6 plays, 62 yards, 1:31.

Top passers

- DET – Matthew Stafford – 28/41, 385 yards, 3 TD, INT
- GB – Aaron Rodgers – 15/24, 205 yards, 4 TD

Top rushers

- DET – Dwayne Washington – 10 rushes, 38 yards
- GB – Eddie Lacy – 17 rushes, 103 yards

Top receivers

- DET – Marvin Jones – 6 receptions, 205 yards, 2 TD
- GB – Jordy Nelson – 6 receptions, 101 yards, 2 TD

The Lions traveled west in week 3 to play their division rival the Green Bay Packers. The Packers got on the board first with a 14-yard touchdown pass from Aaron Rodgers to Davante Adams. The Lions responded with a 42-yard field goal from Matt Prater. Green Bay accumulated a big lead with two touchdown catches by Jordy Nelson for eight and later 17 yards, one by Richard Rodgers from two-yards, as well as a 36-yard field goal from Mason Crosby. Detroit made the halftime score 31–10 after Marvin Jones caught a 17-yard touchdown catch from Matthew Stafford. After the break, the Lions attempted a comeback with touchdown catches by Anquan Boldin and Marvin Jones, from two and 45-yards respectively, as well a 50-yard Prater field goal. Despite only allowing a 46-yard Packers field goal in the second half, the Lions came up short, losing 27–34.

==== Week 4: at Chicago Bears ====
Week Four: Detroit Lions at Chicago Bears – Game summary

Quarter	1	2	3	4	Total
Lions	0	3	3	8	14
Bears	7	0	7	3	17

at Soldier Field, Chicago, Illinois

- Date: October 2
- Game time: 1:00 pm. EDT/12:00 pm. CDT
- Game weather: 62 °F (17 °C), cloudy
- Game attendance: 60,841
- Referee: Tony Corrente
- TV announcers (Fox): Kenny Albert, Daryl Johnston and Laura Okmin
- Recap, Gamebook

Game information

First quarter

- CHI – Eddie Royal 4-yard pass from Brian Hoyer (Connor Barth kick), 6:35. Bears 7–0. Drive: 10 plays, 83 yards, 5:02.

Second quarter

- DET – Matt Prater 50-yard field goal, 2:19. Bears 7–3. Drive: 9 plays, 31 yards, 4:11.

Third quarter

- DET – Matt Prater 21-yard field goal, 7:18. Bears 7–6. Drive: 13 plays, 66 yards, 7:42.
- CHI – Zach Miller 6-yard pass from Brian Hoyer (Connor Barth kick), 3:34. Bears 14–6. Drive: 6 plays, 75 yards, 3:44.

Fourth quarter

- CHI – Connor Barth 25-yard field goal, 10:09. Bears 17–6. Drive: 11 plays, 73 yards, 5:51.
- DET – Andre Roberts 85-yard punt return (Matthew Stafford–Golden Tate pass), 1:52. Bears 17–14.

Top passers

- DET – Matthew Stafford – 23/36, 213 yards, 2 INT
- CHI – Brian Hoyer – 28/36, 302 yards, 2 TD

Top rushers

- DET – Theo Riddick – 11 rushes, 31 yards
- CHI – Jordan Howard – 23 rushes, 111 yards

Top receivers

- DET – Marvin Jones – 5 receptions, 74 yards
- CHI – Eddie Royal – 7 receptions, 111 yards, TD

In week 4, the Lions had their second consecutive divisional road game when they visited the Chicago Bears. The Bears got on the board first with a four-yard touchdown pass from Brian Hoyer to Eddie Royal. The Lions responded with a 50-yard field goal from Matt Prater, which made the score 7–3 in favor of the Bears at half-time. The Lions opened the scoring in the second half with a 21-yard field goal from Matt Prater. The Bears responded with a six-yard touchdown pass from Hoyer to Zach Miller. The Bears extended their lead in the fourth quarter with a 25-yard field goal from Connor Barth. The Lions responded with an 85-yard punt return by Andre Roberts, and a two-point conversion pass from Matthew Stafford to Golden Tate. Despite the attempted comeback, the Lions came up short, losing 14–17.

==== Week 5: vs. Philadelphia Eagles ====
Week Five: Philadelphia Eagles at Detroit Lions – Game summary

Quarter	1	2	3	4	Total
Eagles	0	10	10	3	23
Lions	14	7	0	3	24

at Ford Field, Detroit, Michigan

- Date: October 9
- Game time: 1:00 pm. EDT
- Game weather: Played indoors (dome stadium)
- Game attendance: 58,047
- Referee: Pete Morelli
- TV announcers (Fox): Thom Brennaman, Charles Davis, Chris Spielman and Peter Schrager
- Recap, Gamebook

Game information

First quarter

- DET – Theo Riddick 1-yard pass from Matthew Stafford (Matt Prater kick), 9:37. Lions 7–0. Drive: 11 plays, 75 yards, 5:23.
- DET – Theo Riddick 17-yard pass from Matthew Stafford (Matt Prater kick), 0:53. Lions 14–0. Drive: 9 plays, 80 yards, 5:09.

Second quarter

- PHI – Ryan Mathews 1-yard pass from Carson Wentz (Caleb Sturgis kick), 10:21. Lions 14–7. Drive: 9 plays, 75 yards, 5:32.
- DET – Marvin Jones 1-yard pass from Matthew Stafford (Matt Prater kick), 3:08. Lions 21–7. Drive: 12 plays, 75 yards, 7:13.
- PHI – Caleb Sturgis 50-yard field goal, 0:00. Lions 21–10. Drive: 11 plays, 43 yards, 3:08.

Third quarter

- PHI – Josh Huff 1-yard pass from Carson Wentz (Caleb Sturgis kick), 9:18. Lions 21–17. Drive: 9 plays, 75 yards, 5:42.
- PHI – Caleb Sturgis 33-yard field goal, 6:47. Lions 21–20. Drive: 4 plays, 2 yards, 1:00.

Fourth quarter

- PHI – Caleb Sturgis 49-yard field goal, 6:40. Eagles 23–21. Drive: 11 plays, 49 yards, 5:21.
- DET – Matt Prater 29-yard field goal, 1:29. Lions 24–23. Drive: 7 plays, 34 yards, 1:06.

Top passers

- PHI – Carson Wentz – 25/32, 238 yards, 2 TD, INT
- DET – Matthew Stafford – 18/24, 153 yards, 3 TD

Top rushers

- PHI – Darren Sproles – 5 rushes, 45 yards
- DET – Theo Riddick – 11 rushes, 49 yards

Top receivers

- PHI – Jordan Matthews – 4 receptions, 65 yards
- DET – Anquan Boldin – 4 receptions, 48 yards

In week 5, the Lions hosted the Philadelphia Eagles to start a three-game home stand. The Lions took a 14–0 lead in the first quarter with a pair of touchdown catches by Theo Riddick, from one and 17 yards out respectively. The Eagles responded in the second quarter with a one-yard touchdown pass from Carson Wentz to Ryan Mathews, cutting the Lions lead to seven points. The Lions added to their lead with a one-yard touchdown pass from Stafford to Marvin Jones. The Eagles responded with a 50-yard field goal from Caleb Sturgis, which made the score 21–10 in favor of the Lions at halftime. The Eagles scored 10 points in the third quarter via a one-yard touchdown pass from Wentz to Josh Huff, and a 33-yard field goal from Sturgis, cutting the Lions lead to one point. The Eagles took their first lead of the game, going up 23–21 in the fourth quarter on a 49-yard field goal from Sturgis. At the 2:34 mark of the final quarter, Darius Slay forced a Ryan Mathews fumble, which the Lions recovered inside Eagles territory. This was Philadelphia's first turnover of the 2016 season. The Lions got into range for a 29-yard Matt Prater field goal, making the score 24–23 with 1:28 left. Darius Slay intercepted a Wentz pass on the Eagles' next play from scrimmage, sealing the Lions victory and giving the Eagles their first loss of the season.

==== Week 6: vs. Los Angeles Rams ====
Week Six: Los Angeles Rams at Detroit Lions – Game summary

Quarter	1	2	3	4	Total
Rams	7	7	7	7	28
Lions	7	7	7	10	31

at Ford Field, Detroit, Michigan

- Date: October 16
- Game time: 1:00 pm. EDT
- Game weather: Played indoors (dome stadium)
- Game attendance: 56,018
- Referee: John Hussey
- TV announcers (Fox): Justin Kutcher, Charles Davis, Chris Spielman and Peter Schrager
- Recap, Gamebook

Game information

First quarter

- DET – Marvin Jones 7-yard pass from Matthew Stafford (Matt Prater kick), 10:44. Lions 7–0. Drive: 8 plays, 75 yards, 4:16.
- LA – Kenny Britt 20-yard pass from Case Keenum (Greg Zuerlein kick), 5:15. Tied 7–7. Drive: 10 plays, 75 yards, 5:29.

Second quarter

- LA – Case Keenum 1-yard run (Greg Zuerlein kick), 11:01. Rams 14–7. Drive: 11 plays, 84 yards, 5:51.
- DET – Andre Roberts 2-yard pass from Matthew Stafford (Matt Prater kick), 3:07. Tied 14–14. Drive: 14 plays, 75 yards, 7:54.

Third quarter

- DET – Anquan Boldin 4-yard pass from Matthew Stafford (Matt Prater kick), 9:50. Lions 21–14. Drive: 5 plays, 60 yards, 2:17.
- LA – Lance Kendricks 15-yard pass from Case Keenum (Greg Zuerlein kick), 6:33. Tied 21–21. Drive: 6 plays, 75 yards, 3:17.

Fourth quarter

- LA – Kenny Britt 9-yard pass from Case Keenum (Greg Zuerlein kick), 14:09. Rams 28–21. Drive: 10 plays, 80 yards, 5:47.
- DET – Golden Tate 23-yard pass from Matthew Stafford (Matt Prater kick), 6:02. Tied 28–28. Drive: 13 plays, 84 yards, 8:07.
- DET – Matt Prater 34-yard field goal, 1:29. Lions 31–28. Drive: 9 plays, 44 yards, 3:37.

Top passers

- LA – Case Keenum – 27/32, 321 yards, 3 TD, INT
- DET – Matthew Stafford – 22/31, 270 yards, 4 TD

Top rushers

- LA – Todd Gurley – 14 rushes, 58 yards
- DET – Zach Zenner – 14 rushes, 58 yards

Top receivers

- LA – Kenny Britt – 7 receptions, 136 yards, 2 TD
- DET – Golden Tate – 8 receptions, 165 yards, TD

In week 6, the Lions hosted the Los Angeles Rams. The score seesawed the entire game. The Lions scored first with a seven-yard touchdown pass from Matthew Stafford to Marvin Jones. The Rams tied it up with a 20-yard touchdown pass from Case Keenum to Kenny Britt, and took the lead in the second quarter with a one-yard touchdown run by Keenum. The Lions tied it back up with a two-yard touchdown catch by Andre Roberts on fourth down, and stopped the Rams from taking the lead with a goal line stand as time expired in the second quarter, keeping the score tied 14–14 at halftime. After the break, the Lions took the lead back with a four-yard touchdown catch by Anquan Boldin, but the Rams tied it back up with a 15-yard catch by Lance Kendricks. Los Angeles then retook the lead in the fourth quarter with a nine-yard catch from Britt, but Detroit tied it up again on a 23-yard TD catch by Golden Tate. The Lions took the lead for good with a 34-yard field goal by Matt Prater at the 1:29 mark of the final quarter. Detroit prevented the Rams from getting into range for a game-tying field goal when Rafael Bush intercepted a Keenum pass with just over a minute to play, giving the Lions a 31–28 win and improving their record to 3–3. Golden Tate tallied a career-high 165 yards on eight receptions.

The Lions celebrated the 25th anniversary of their 1991 NFC Central Championship with an on-field reunion of its players at halftime.

==== Week 7: vs. Washington Redskins ====
Week Seven: Washington Redskins at Detroit Lions – Game summary

Quarter	1	2	3	4	Total
Redskins	0	3	0	14	17
Lions	0	3	7	10	20

at Ford Field, Detroit, Michigan

- Date: October 23
- Game time: 1:00 pm. EDT
- Game weather: Played indoors (dome stadium)
- Game attendance: 60,461
- Referee: Walt Coleman
- TV announcers (Fox): Justin Kutcher, Charles Davis, Chris Spielman and Peter Schrager
- Recap, Gamebook

Game information

First quarter

- No scoring plays

Second quarter

- DET – Matt Prater 43-yard field goal, 9:37. Lions 3–0. Drive: 10 plays, 55 yards, 5:43.
- WAS – Dustin Hopkins 38-yard field goal, 0:00. Tied 3–3. Drive: 10 plays, 51 yards, 3:17.

Third quarter

- DET – Zach Zenner 1-yard run (Matt Prater kick), 7:20. Lions 10–3. Drive: 7 plays, 86 yards, 2:53.

Fourth quarter

- DET – Matt Prater 27-yard field goal, 13:10. Lions 13–3. Drive: 10 plays, 53 yards, 5:12.
- WAS – Robert Kelley 1-yard pass from Kirk Cousins (Dustin Hopkins kick), 8:20. Lions 13–10. Drive: 9 plays, 75 yards, 4:50.
- WAS – Kirk Cousins 19-yard run (Dustin Hopkins kick), 1:05. Redskins 17–13. Drive: 9 plays, 76 yards, 4:15.
- DET – Anquan Boldin 18-yard pass from Matthew Stafford (Matt Prater kick), 0:16. Lions 20–17. Drive: 6 plays, 75 yards, 0:49.

Top passers

- WAS – Kirk Cousins – 30/39, 301 yards, TD
- DET – Matthew Stafford – 18/29, 266 yards, TD

Top rushers

- WAS – Chris Thompson – 12 rushes, 79 yards
- DET – Justin Forsett – 8 rushes, 33 yards

Top receivers

- WAS – Jamison Crowder – 7 receptions, 108 yards
- DET – Marvin Jones – 4 receptions, 94 yards

In week 7, the Lions hosted the Washington Redskins. After a scoreless first quarter, each team scored only a field goal in the second quarter: first Detroit's Matt Prater from 43 yards, then Washington's Dustin Hopkins from 38 yards, to tie the game at three points apiece at halftime. The only score of the third quarter was a one-yard touchdown run by the Lions' Zach Zenner. The Lions extended their lead in the fourth quarter via a 27-yard field goal from Prater. The Redskins responded with 14 consecutive points on a pair of touchdowns, first with a one-yard pass from Kirk Cousins to Robert Kelley, and next on a 19-yard run by Cousins. This give the Redskins their first lead of the game, 17–13, with just over a minute to go. The Lions took the lead back on the next drive, when Matthew Stafford hit Anquan Boldin for an 18-yard TD with 16 seconds left, to win the game, 20–17.

==== Week 8: at Houston Texans ====
Week Eight: Detroit Lions at Houston Texans – Game summary

Quarter	1	2	3	4	Total
Lions	0	3	0	10	13
Texans	0	14	3	3	20

at NRG Stadium, Houston, Texas

- Date: October 30
- Game time: 1:00 pm. EDT/12:00 pm. CDT
- Game weather: Played indoors (retractable roof closed)
- Game attendance: 71,882
- Referee: Brad Allen
- TV announcers (Fox): Chris Myers, Ronde Barber and Jennifer Hale
- Recap, Gamebook

Game information

First quarter

- No scoring plays

Second quarter

- HOU – C. J. Fiedorowicz 6-yard pass from Brock Osweiler (Nick Novak kick), 12:56. Texans 7–0. Drive: 12 plays, 61 yards, 5:54.
- HOU – Lamar Miller 1-yard run (Nick Novak kick), 7:04. Texans 14–0. Drive: 10 plays, 53 yards, 4:34.
- DET – Matt Prater 47-yard field goal, 0:06. Texans 14–3. Drive: 5 plays, 52 yards, 0:30.

Third quarter

- HOU – Nick Novak 33-yard field goal, 5:51. Texans 17–3. Drive: 9 plays, 46 yards, 4:30.

Fourth quarter

- DET – Theo Riddick 1-yard pass from Matthew Stafford (Matt Prater kick), 14:50. Texans 17–10. Drive: 13 plays, 75 yards, 6:01.
- HOU – Nick Novak 36-yard field goal, 4:09. Texans 20–10. Drive: 9 plays, 47 yards, 6:05.
- DET – Matt Prater 34-yard field goal, 2:53. Texans 20–13. Drive: 6 plays, 39 yards, 1:16.

Top passers

- DET – Matthew Stafford – 27/41, 240 yards, TD
- HOU – Brock Osweiler – 20/29, 186 yards, TD, INT

Top rushers

- DET – Theo Riddick – 11 rushes, 56 yards
- HOU – Lamar Miller – 17 rushes, 56 yards, TD

Top receivers

- DET – Eric Ebron – 7 receptions, 79 yards
- HOU – DeAndre Hopkins – 4 receptions, 44 yards

In week 8, the Lions visited the Houston Texans. After a scoreless first quarter, the Texans took an early lead that they never relinquished with a pair of touchdowns. First, Brock Osweiler connected with C. J. Fiedorowicz on a six-yard touchdown pass, then Lamar Miller scored on a one-yard run. The Lions' only score of the first half was a 47-yard field goal from Matt Prater, making the halftime score 14–3. The only score of the third quarter was a 33-yard field goal from Houston's Nick Novak. Detroit responded with a one-yard touchdown catch by Theo Riddick in the fourth quarter, but the Texans went back up by 10 points after a 36-yard Novak field goal. The Lions scored the final points of the game with a 34-yard field goal. Despite the attempted late game comeback, Detroit came up short, losing 20–13 and snapping their three-game winning streak.

==== Week 9: at Minnesota Vikings ====
Week Nine: Detroit Lions at Minnesota Vikings – Game summary

Quarter	1	2	3	4	OT	Total
Lions	3	7	0	6	6	22
Vikings	0	3	6	7	0	16

at U.S. Bank Stadium, Minneapolis, Minnesota

- Date: November 6
- Game time: 1:00 pm. EST/12:00 pm. CST
- Game weather: Played indoors (dome stadium)
- Game attendance: 66,807
- Referee: Ed Hochuli
- TV announcers (Fox): Kenny Albert, Daryl Johnston and Laura Okmin
- Recap, Gamebook

Game information

First quarter

- DET – Matt Prater 47-yard field goal, 7:14. Lions 3–0. Drive: 9 plays, 57 yards, 5:00.

Second quarter

- MIN – Blair Walsh 33-yard field goal, 13:20. Tied 3–3. Drive: 12 plays, 61 yards, 4:35.
- DET – Anquan Boldin 1-yard pass from Matthew Stafford (Matt Prater kick), 0:05. Lions 10–3. Drive: 17 plays, 84 yards, 9:45.

Third quarter

- MIN – Kyle Rudolph 1-yard pass from Sam Bradford (kick hit right upright), 4:02. Lions 10–9. Drive: 9 plays, 78 yards, 5:33.

Fourth quarter

- DET – Matt Prater 53-yard field goal, 12:33. Lions 13–9. Drive: 4 plays, 8 yards, 1:08.
- MIN – Rhett Ellison 1-yard run (Blair Walsh kick), 0:23. Vikings 16–13. Drive: 13 plays, 79 yards, 3:51.
- DET – Matt Prater 58-yard field goal, 0:00. Tied 16–16. Drive: 4 plays, 35 yards, 0:23.

Overtime

- DET – Golden Tate 28-yard pass from Matthew Stafford, 8:21. Lions 22–16. Drive: 11 plays, 87 yards, 6:39.

Top passers

- DET – Matthew Stafford – 23/36, 219 yards, 2 TD, INT
- MIN – Sam Bradford – 31/40, 273 yards, TD

Top rushers

- DET – Theo Riddick – 14 rushes, 70 yards
- MIN – Ronnie Hillman – 7 rushes, 30 yards

Top receivers

- DET – Eric Ebron – 7 receptions, 92 yards
- MIN – Stefon Diggs – 13 receptions, 80 yards

In week 9, the Lions visited their division rival the Minnesota Vikings. The Lions opened the scoring in the first quarter via a 47-yard field goal from Matt Prater. The Vikings responded in the second quarter via a 33-yard field goal from Blair Walsh. Detroit came back with a one-yard touchdown pass from Stafford to Boldin, giving them a 10–3 lead at halftime. In the third quarter, the Vikings reduced the Lions lead to one point via a one-yard touchdown pass from Sam Bradford to Kyle Rudolph, but Walsh missed the extra point kick. The Lions extended their lead in the fourth quarter via a 53-yard field goal from Prater. Minnesota took a three-point lead via a one-yard touchdown run from Rhett Ellison with 23 seconds left in the game. Detroit responded with a 58-yard field goal from Prater to tie the score at 16 as time expired, forcing overtime. In the extra session, Detroit scored on its opening possession via a 28-yard touchdown pass from Stafford to Tate, where Tate stiff-armed safety Harrison Smith and then flipped into the end-zone, earning a 22–16 win.

==== Week 11: vs. Jacksonville Jaguars ====
Week Eleven: Jacksonville Jaguars at Detroit Lions – Game summary

Quarter	1	2	3	4	Total
Jaguars	3	6	10	0	19
Lions	0	9	7	10	26

at Ford Field, Detroit, Michigan

- Date: November 20
- Game time: 1:00 pm. EST
- Game weather: Played indoors (dome stadium)
- Game attendance: 61,486
- Referee: Bill Vinovich
- TV announcers (CBS): Andrew Catalon, Steve Beuerlein and Steve Tasker
- Recap, Gamebook

Game information

First quarter

- JAX – Jason Myers 27-yard field goal, 1:36. Jaguars 3–0. Drive: 4 plays, 2 yards, 0:54.

Second quarter

- DET – Andre Roberts 55-yard punt return (kick blocked), 11:13. Lions 6–3.
- JAX – Allen Robinson 3-yard pass from Blake Bortles (kick failed, wide right), 2:45. Jaguars 9–6. Drive: 7 plays, 54 yards, 3:19.
- DET – Matt Prater 27-yard field goal, 0:19. Tied 9–9. Drive: 10 plays, 67 yards, 2:26.

Third quarter

- DET – Rafael Bush 39-yard interception return (Matt Prater kick), 14:02. Lions 16–9.
- JAX – Jason Myers 52-yard field goal, 9:20. Lions 16–12. Drive: 7 plays, 41 yards, 4:42.
- JAX – Marqise Lee 3-yard pass from Blake Bortles (Jason Myers kick), 2:10. Jaguars 19–16. Drive: 9 plays, 87 yards, 4:56.

Fourth quarter

- DET – Eric Ebron 1-yard run (Matt Prater kick), 10:03. Lions 23–19. Drive: 7 plays, 79 yards, 3:21.
- DET – Matt Prater 43-yard field goal, 0:22. Lions 26–19. Drive: 15 plays, 60 yards, 7:57.

Top passers

- JAX – Blake Bortles – 22/35, 202 yards, 2 TD, 2 INT
- DET – Matthew Stafford – 24/33, 278 yards

Top rushers

- JAX – Chris Ivory – 17 rushes, 39 yards
- DET – Theo Riddick – 4 rushes, 13 yards

Top receivers

- JAX – Chris Ivory – 6 receptions, 75 yards
- DET – Eric Ebron – 3 receptions, 70 yards, TD

In week 11 following their bye-week, the Lions hosted the Jacksonville Jaguars. The Jaguars opened the scoring in the first quarter via a 27-yard field goal from Jason Myers. The Lions' first score came in the second quarter on a 55-yard punt return from Andre Roberts, but the extra point try by Matt Prater was partially blocked and failed. The Jaguars responded with a three-yard touchdown pass from Blake Bortles to Allen Robinson, but the conversion attempt by Myers also failed. The Lions then scored on a 27-yard field goal from Matt Prater, which tied the score at 9–9 at halftime. The Lions took the lead in the third quarter via a 39-yard interception return from Rafael Bush. The Jaguars responded with 10 points in the third quarter via a 52-yard field goal from Myers, and a three-yard touchdown pass from Bortles to Marqise Lee, giving them a 19–16 lead. The Lions, trailing for the ninth straight game when entering the fourth quarter, would score the final 10 points of the game. The Lions offense scored its first and only touchdown on a one-yard run from Eric Ebron, and Matt Prater added a 43-yard field goal with 22 seconds left in the game. On the final drive for the Jaguars, Tavon Wilson intercepted a pass from Bortles, sealing the Lions 26–19 victory.

The Lions became the first team in NFL history to have its first ten games of a season all decided by seven or fewer points.

==== Week 12: vs. Minnesota Vikings ====
Thanksgiving Day game

Week Twelve: Minnesota Vikings at Detroit Lions – Game summary

Quarter	1	2	3	4	Total
Vikings	7	0	3	3	13
Lions	7	3	0	6	16

at Ford Field, Detroit, Michigan

- Date: November 24
- Game time: 12:30 pm. EST
- Game weather: Played indoors (dome stadium)
- Game attendance: 63,793
- Referee: Carl Cheffers
- TV announcers (CBS): Jim Nantz, Phil Simms, Tracy Wolfson and Jay Feely
- Recap, Gamebook

Game information

First quarter

- DET – Anquan Boldin 2-yard pass from Matthew Stafford (Matt Prater kick), 7:14. Lions 7–0. Drive: 12 plays, 75 yards, 7:46.
- MIN – Matt Asiata 5-yard run (Kai Forbath kick), 0:40. Tied 7–7. Drive: 12 plays, 75 yards, 6:34.

Second quarter

- DET – Matt Prater 29-yard field goal, 6:45. Lions 10–7. Drive: 6 plays, 59 yards, 3:05.

Third quarter

- MIN – Kai Forbath 30-yard field goal, 7:03. Tied 10–10. Drive: 5 plays, 49 yards, 2:42.

Fourth quarter

- MIN – Kai Forbath 28-yard field goal, 12:38. Vikings 13–10. Drive: 13 plays, 76 yards, 7:36.
- DET – Matt Prater 48-yard field goal, 1:45. Tied 13–13. Drive: 10 plays, 68 yards, 3:17.
- DET – Matt Prater 40-yard field goal, 0:00. Lions 16–13. Drive: 2 plays, −2 yards, 0:30.

Top passers

- MIN – Sam Bradford – 31/37, 224 yards, INT
- DET – Matthew Stafford – 23/40, 232 yards, TD

Top rushers

- MIN – Jerick McKinnon – 9 rushes, 31 yards
- DET – Theo Riddick – 9 rushes, 45 yards

Top receivers

- MIN – Kyle Rudolph – 9 receptions, 64 yards
- DET – Golden Tate – 5 receptions, 77 yards

For their annual Thanksgiving Day game, the Lions hosted a rematch with division rival the Minnesota Vikings, with both teams coming into the game at 6–4 and the winner gaining first place in the NFC North. The Lions opened the scoring in the first quarter via a two-yard touchdown pass from Matthew Stafford to Anquan Boldin. The Vikings responded with a five-yard touchdown run from Matt Asiata. In the second quarter, the Lions recorded a 29-yard field goal from Matt Prater, which made the score 10–7 in favor of the Lions at halftime. The Vikings again tied the score in the third quarter via a 30-yard field goal from Kai Forbath, and took their first lead of the game in the fourth quarter via a 28-yard field goal from Forbath. The Lions responded with a 48-yard field goal from Prater to tie the game. With 38 seconds left in the fourth quarter, Darius Slay intercepted a pass from Sam Bradford. Two plays later, Prater recorded a 40-yard field goal as time expired, giving the Lions a 16–13 win. This would be the last time the Lions won on Thanksgiving Day until 2024.

The Lions have trailed in the fourth quarter of every game this season, and tied an NFL record for the most fourth quarter comeback wins in a season with seven, set by the 2009 Indianapolis Colts. The Lions extended their own NFL record of games to start a season being decided by seven points or fewer, now standing at eleven.

==== Week 13: at New Orleans Saints ====
Week Thirteen: Detroit Lions at New Orleans Saints – Game summary

Quarter	1	2	3	4	Total
Lions	3	10	6	9	28
Saints	0	6	0	7	13

at Mercedes-Benz Superdome, New Orleans, Louisiana

- Date: December 4
- Game time: 1:00 pm. EST/12:00 pm. CST
- Game weather: Played indoors (dome stadium)
- Game attendance: 73,137
- Referee: Clete Blakeman
- TV announcers (Fox): Chris Myers, Ronde Barber and Jennifer Hale
- Recap, Gamebook

Game information

First quarter

- DET – Matt Prater 27-yard field goal, 8:14. Lions 3–0. Drive: 9 plays, 44 yards, 5:09.

Second quarter

- DET – Theo Riddick 1-yard pass from Matthew Stafford (Matt Prater kick), 13:03. Lions 10–0. Drive: 11 plays, 92 yards, 7:25.
- NO – Wil Lutz 40-yard field goal, 5:05. Lions 10–3. Drive: 6 plays, 26 yards, 3:45.
- DET – Matt Prater 29-yard field goal, 0:56. Lions 13–3. Drive: 12 plays, 64 yards, 4:09.
- NO – Wil Lutz 32-yard field goal, 0:00. Lions 10–6. Drive: 6 plays, 75 yards, 0:56.

Third quarter

- DET – Matt Prater 32-yard field goal, 8:57. Lions 16–6. Drive: 10 plays, 63 yards, 6:03.
- DET – Matt Prater 27-yard field goal, 1:42. Lions 19–6. Drive: 11 plays, 45 yards, 4:33.

Fourth quarter

- NO – John Kuhn 1-yard run (Wil Lutz kick), 13:32. Lions 19–13. Drive: 7 plays, 75 yards, 3:10.
- DET – Golden Tate 66-yard pass from Matthew Stafford (pass failed), 11:38. Lions 25–13. Drive: 5 plays, 78 yards, 1:54.
- DET – Matt Prater 52-yard field goal, 7:10. Lions 28–13. Drive: 6 plays, 21 yards, 3:06.

Top passers

- DET – Matthew Stafford – 30/42, 341 yards, 2 TD
- NO – Drew Brees – 31/44, 326 yards, 3 INT

Top rushers

- DET – Zach Zenner – 9 rushes, 40 yards
- NO – Mark Ingram Jr. – 7 rushes, 37 yards

Top receivers

- DET – Golden Tate – 8 receptions, 145 yards, TD
- NO – Coby Fleener – 5 receptions, 86 yards

After their Thanksgiving win, the Lions traveled south to play the New Orleans Saints. The Lions opened the scoring in the first quarter via a 27-yard field goal from Matt Prater. Detroit extended their lead in the second quarter via a one-yard touchdown pass from Matthew Stafford to Theo Riddick. The Saints reduced the Lions lead to seven points via a 40-yard field goal from Wil Lutz. The two teams exchanged field goals, one from Prater from 29 yards, and one from Lutz from 32 yards, making the score 13–6 in favor of the Lions at halftime. The Lions added two field goals from Prater in the third quarter, from 32 yards and 27 yards out, extending their lead to 19–6. The Saints opened the scoring in the fourth quarter with a one-yard touchdown run from John Kuhn. The Lions responded on the next drive with a 66-yard touchdown pass from Stafford to Golden Tate, which was followed by a failed two-point conversion. Matt Prater finished the scoring with a 52-yard field goal, giving the Lions a 28–13 win.

This marked the first game all year in which the Lions never trailed in the fourth quarter, and their first game of 2016 to be decided by more than seven points. The Lions defense held Saints quarterback Drew Brees without a touchdown pass, ending a streak of 60 straight home games in which Brees threw for at least one touchdown. Further, the Lions won a road game following their Thanksgiving Day game for the first time since 1974, ending a streak of 22 losses in such games. In one stretch during the first half, Matthew Stafford completed 14 consecutive passes, a Lions franchise record.

==== Week 14: vs. Chicago Bears ====
Week Fourteen: Chicago Bears at Detroit Lions – Game summary

Quarter	1	2	3	4	Total
Bears	3	0	7	7	17
Lions	0	10	3	7	20

at Ford Field, Detroit, Michigan

- Date: December 11
- Game time: 1:00 pm. EST
- Game weather: Played indoors (dome stadium)
- Game attendance: 61,726
- Referee: Jeff Triplette
- TV announcers (CBS): Spero Dedes and Solomon Wilcots
- Recap, Gamebook

Game information

First quarter

- CHI – Connor Barth 38-yard field goal, 1:27. Bears 3–0. Drive: 12 plays, 60 yards, 7:17.

Second quarter

- DET – Matt Prater 29-yard field goal, 4:17. Tied 3–3. Drive: 12 plays, 74 yards, 6:58.
- DET – Anquan Boldin 16-yard pass from Matthew Stafford (Matt Prater kick), 0:19. Lions 10–3. Drive: 10 plays, 81 yards, 2:07.

Third quarter

- DET – Matt Prater 54-yard field goal, 5:35. Lions 13–3. Drive: 10 plays, 44 yards, 6:04.
- CHI – Cameron Meredith 31-yard pass from Matt Barkley (Connor Barth kick), 3:19. Lions 13–10. Drive: 4 plays, 75 yards, 2:16.

Fourth quarter

- CHI – Cre'Von LeBlanc 24-yard interception return (Connor Barth kick), 7:07. Bears 17–13.
- DET – Matthew Stafford 7-yard run (Matt Prater kick), 3:16. Lions 20–17. Drive: 7 plays, 76 yards, 3:50.

Top passers

- CHI – Matt Barkley – 20/32, 212 yards, TD
- DET – Matthew Stafford – 21/35, 223 yards, TD, 2 INT

Top rushers

- CHI – Jordan Howard – 13 rushes, 86 yards
- DET – Dwayne Washington – 16 rushes, 64 yards

Top receivers

- CHI – Cameron Meredith – 6 receptions, 72 yards, TD
- DET – Golden Tate – 6 receptions, 58 yards

In week 14, the Lions returned home for a rematch with division rival the Chicago Bears, who defeated the Lions in Chicago in week 4. The Bears opened the scoring in the first quarter via a 38-yard field goal from Connor Barth. The Lions responded with 10 points in the second quarter via a 29-yard field goal from Matt Prater, and a 16-yard touchdown pass from Matthew Stafford to Anquan Boldin, which made the score 10–3 in favor of the Lions at half-time. The Lions extended their lead in the third quarter via a 54-yard field goal from Prater. The Bears reduced the Lions lead to three points via a 31-yard touchdown pass from Matt Barkley to Cameron Meredith. The Bears regained the lead in the fourth quarter via a 24-yard interception return from Cre'Von LeBlanc. The Lions responded with a seven-yard touchdown run from Stafford with 3:17 left in the game, giving the Lions a 20–17 lead they held onto for the win, and breaking an NFL record with 8 comebacks in a single season.

With the win, the Lions have won five games in a row for the first time since 2011. The Lions have also held opponents to 20 points or fewer in seven straight games, their longest such streak since 1961.

==== Week 15: at New York Giants ====
Week Fifteen: Detroit Lions at New York Giants – Game summary

Quarter	1	2	3	4	Total
Lions	0	3	3	0	6
Giants	7	3	0	7	17

at MetLife Stadium, East Rutherford, New Jersey

- Date: December 18
- Game time: 1:00 pm. EST
- Game weather: 55 °F (13 °C), rain
- Game attendance: 79,434
- Referee: Tony Corrente
- TV announcers (Fox): Joe Buck, Troy Aikman and Erin Andrews
- Recap, Gamebook

Game information

First quarter

- NYG – Sterling Shepard 6-yard pass from Eli Manning (Robbie Gould kick), 9:23. Giants 7–0. Drive: 10 plays, 75 yards, 5:37.

Second quarter

- DET – Matt Prater 48-yard field goal, 14:02. Giants 7–3. Drive: 11 plays, 40 yards, 5:27.
- NYG – Robbie Gould 47-yard field goal, 5:00. Giants 10–3. Drive: 11 plays, 51 yards, 5:53.

Third quarter

- DET – Matt Prater 33-yard field goal, 7:40. Giants 10–6. Drive: 12 plays, 45 yards, 7:20.

Fourth quarter

- NYG – Odell Beckham Jr. 4-yard pass from Eli Manning (Robbie Gould kick), 5:47. Giants 17–6. Drive: 8 plays, 71 yards, 3:23.

Top passers

- DET – Matthew Stafford – 24/39, 273 yards, INT
- NYG – Eli Manning – 20/28, 201 yards, 2 TD

Top rushers

- DET – Dwayne Washington – 14 rushes, 31 yards
- NYG – Paul Perkins – 11 rushes, 6 yards

Top receivers

- DET – Golden Tate – 8 receptions, 122 yards
- NYG – Odell Beckham Jr. – 6 receptions, 64 yards, TD

In week 15, the Lions traveled east to play the New York Giants. The Giants opened the scoring in the first quarter via a six-yard touchdown pass from Eli Manning to Sterling Shepard. The two teams exchanged field goals in the second quarter, one from Matt Prater from 48 yards, and one from Robbie Gould from 47 yards, making the score 10–3 in favor of the Giants at halftime. The Lions reduced the lead to four points in the third quarter via a 33-yard field goal from Prater. The Giants extended their lead in fourth quarter with a four-yard touchdown pass from Manning to Odell Beckham Jr. The Lions' attempted comeback failed when Matthew Stafford was picked off by Dominique Rodgers-Cromartie in the end-zone for a touchback with 2:09 left in the game, losing 17–6, and snapping their five-game winning streak.

==== Week 16: at Dallas Cowboys ====
Week Sixteen: Detroit Lions at Dallas Cowboys – Game summary

Quarter	1	2	3	4	Total
Lions	7	14	0	0	21
Cowboys	14	7	14	7	42

at AT&T Stadium, Arlington, Texas

- Date: December 26
- Game time: 8:30 pm. EST/7:30 pm. CST
- Game weather: Played indoors (retractable roof closed)
- Game attendance: 92,885
- Referee: John Hussey
- TV announcers (ESPN): Sean McDonough, Jon Gruden and Lisa Salters
- Recap, Gamebook

Game information

First quarter

- DAL – Brice Butler 21-yard pass from Dak Prescott (Dan Bailey Kick), 9:57. Cowboys 7–0. Drive: 9 plays, 66 yards, 5:03.
- DET – Zach Zenner 7-yard run (Matt Prater Kick), 5:23. Tied 7–7. Drive: 9 plays, 75 yards, 4:34.
- DAL – Ezekiel Elliott 55-yard run (Dan Bailey Kick), 2:49. Cowboys 14–7. Drive: 4 plays, 66 yards, 2:34.

Second quarter

- DET – Matthew Stafford 1-yard run (Matt Prater Kick), 13:32. Tied 14–14. Drive: 11 plays, 58 yards, 4:17.
- DET – Zach Zenner 5-yard run (Matt Prater Kick), 7:40. Lions 21–14. Drive: 8 plays, 53 yards, 4:01.
- DAL – Dez Bryant 25-yard pass from Dak Prescott (Dan Bailey Kick), 1:04. Tied 21–21. Drive: 6 plays, 51 yards, 2:10.

Third quarter

- DAL – Ezekiel Elliott 1-yard run (Dan Bailey Kick), 10:19. Cowboys 28–21. Drive: 3 plays, 38 yards, 1:46.
- DAL – Jason Witten 10-yard pass from Dez Bryant (Dan Bailey Kick), 4:03. Cowboys 35–21. Drive: 7 plays, 95 yards, 4:05.

Fourth quarter

- DAL – Dez Bryant 19-yard pass from Dak Prescott (Dan Bailey Kick), 12:12. Cowboys 42–21. Drive: 7 plays, 63 yards, 3:35.

Top passers

- DET – Matthew Stafford – 26/46, 260 yards, INT
- DAL – Dak Prescott – 15/20, 212 yards, 3 TD

Top rushers

- DET – Zach Zenner – 12 rushes, 67 yards, 2 TD
- DAL – Ezekiel Elliott – 12 rushes, 80 yards, 2 TD

Top receivers

- DET – Eric Ebron – 8 receptions, 93 yards
- DAL – Dez Bryant – 4 receptions, 70 yards, 2 TD

In week 16, the Lions flew southwest to play the Dallas Cowboys on Monday Night Football. The Cowboys opened the scoring in the first quarter via a 21-yard touchdown pass from Dak Prescott to Brice Butler. The Lions responded with a 7-yard touchdown run from Zach Zenner. The Cowboys regained the lead via a 55-yard touchdown run from Ezekiel Elliott. The Lions scored 14 points in the second quarter via a 1-yard touchdown run from Matthew Stafford and a 5-yard run from Zenner, to take their first lead of the game. The Cowboys responded with a 25-yard touchdown pass from Prescott to Dez Bryant, which tied the score 21–21 at halftime. The Cowboys scored 21 unanswered points in the second half, via a 1-yard touchdown run from Elliott and a 10-yard touchdown pass from Bryant to Jason Witten in the third quarter, and a 19-yard touchdown pass from Prescott to Bryant in the fourth quarter, making the final score 42–21.

The Lions' streak of holding opponents to 20 points or fewer was ended at eight consecutive games.

==== Week 17: vs. Green Bay Packers ====
Week Seventeen: Green Bay Packers at Detroit Lions – Game summary

Quarter	1	2	3	4	Total
Packers	0	10	7	14	31
Lions	0	14	0	10	24

at Ford Field, Detroit, Michigan

- Date: January 1, 2017
- Game time: 8:30 pm. EST
- Game weather: Played indoors (dome stadium)
- Referee: Jerome Boger
- TV announcers (NBC): Al Michaels, Cris Collinsworth, and Michele Tafoya
- Recap, Gamebook

Game information

First quarter

- No scoring plays

Second quarter

- GB – Aaron Ripkowski 7-yard pass from Aaron Rodgers (Mason Crosby kick), 10:54. Packers 7–0. Drive: 8 plays, 71 yards, 4:09.
- DET – Zach Zenner 1-yard run (Matt Prater kick), 5:03. Tied 7–7. Drive: 11 plays, 80 yards, 5:47.
- DET – Golden Tate 3-yard pass from Matthew Stafford (Matt Prater kick), 10:54. Lions 14–7. Drive: 11 plays, 69 yards, 2:08.
- GB – Mason Crosby 53-yard field goal, 0:03. Lions 14–10. Drive: 5 plays, 40 yards, 0:23.

Third quarter

- GB – Davante Adams 3-yard pass from Aaron Rodgers (Mason Crosby kick), 9:27. Packers 17–14. Drive: 10 plays, 75 yards, 5:37.

Fourth quarter

- GB – Geronimo Allison 10-yard pass from Aaron Rodgers (kick failed, wide right), 10:13. Packers 23–14. Drive: 10 plays, 81 yards, 4:37.
- DET – Matt Prater 54-yard field goal, 7:47. Packers 23–17. Drive: 7 plays, 33 yards, 2:20.
- GB – Davante Adams 9-yard pass from Aaron Rodgers (Aaron Rodgers–Davante Adams pass), 2:54. Packers 31–17. Drive: 11 plays, 75 yards, 4:52.
- DET – Anquan Boldin 35-yard pass from Matthew Stafford (Matt Prater kick), 0:22. Packers 31–24. Drive: 1 play, 35 yards, 0:09.

Top passers

- GB – Aaron Rodgers – 27/39, 300 yards, 4 TD
- DET – Matthew Stafford – 26/41, 347 yards, 2 TD, INT

Top rushers

- GB – Aaron Ripkowski – 9 rushes, 61 yards
- DET – Zach Zenner – 20 rushes, 69 yards, TD

Top receivers

- GB – Geronimo Allison – 4 receptions, 91 yards, TD
- DET – Golden Tate – 6 receptions, 77 yards, TD

To finish the regular season, the Lions hosted a rematch with division rival the Green Bay Packers on Sunday Night Football, their second consecutive nationally televised, prime-time game. After a scoreless first quarter, the Packers opened the scoring in the second quarter via a seven-yard touchdown pass from Aaron Rodgers to Aaron Ripkowski. The Lions responded with 14 points via a one-yard touchdown run from Zach Zenner and a three-yard touchdown pass from Matthew Stafford to Golden Tate. The Packers reduced the Lions lead to four points via a 53-yard field goal from Mason Crosby, which made the score 14–10 in favor of the Lions at half-time. The Packers regained the lead in the third quarter via a three-yard touchdown pass from Rodgers to Davante Adams, and increased it in the fourth quarter via a 10-yard touchdown pass from Rodgers to Geronimo Allison, and a nine-yard touchdown pass from Rodgers to Adams. The Lions responded with a 54-yard field goal from Matt Prater and a 35-yard touchdown pass from Stafford to Anquan Boldin but came up short, losing 24–31. With the loss, Green Bay won the NFC North division title, but Detroit won a wildcard spot, thanks to Washington's loss to the Giants earlier in the day.

=== Postseason ===
==== NFC Wild Card Playoffs: at (3) Seattle Seahawks ====
NFC Wild Card Playoffs: (6) Detroit Lions at (3) Seattle Seahawks – Game summary

Quarter	1	2	3	4	Total
Lions	0	3	3	0	6
Seahawks	0	10	0	16	26

at CenturyLink Field, Seattle, Washington

- Date: January 7, 2017
- Game time: 8:15 p.m. EST/5:15 p.m. PST
- Game weather: 38 °F (3 °C), cloudy
- Game attendance: 68,788
- Referee: Brad Allen
- TV announcers (NBC): Al Michaels, Cris Collinsworth, Michele Tafoya and Heather Cox
- Recap, Gamebook

Game information

First quarter

- No scoring plays

Second quarter

- SEA – Paul Richardson 2-yard pass from Russell Wilson (Steven Hauschka kick), 7:07. Seahawks 7–0. Drive: 14 plays, 60 yards, 7:45.
- SEA – Steven Hauschka 43-yard field goal, 1:55. Seahawks 10–0. Drive: 7 play, 51 yards, 2:53.
- DET – Matt Prater 51-yard field goal, 0:20. Seahawks 10–3. Drive: 7 play, 42 yards, 1:35.

Third quarter

- DET – Matt Prater 53-yard field goal, 4:03. Seahawks 10–6. Drive: 10 play, 61 yards, 5:33.

Fourth quarter

- SEA – Steven Hauschka 27-yard field goal, 14:12. Seahawks 13–6. Drive: 10 play, 66 yards, 4:51.
- SEA – Thomas Rawls 4-yard run (kick failed, hit right upright), 8:49. Seahawks 19–6. Drive: 8 plays, 82 yards, 4:08.
- SEA – Doug Baldwin 13-yard pass from Russell Wilson (Steven Hauschka kick), 3:36. Seahawks 26–6. Drive: 11 plays, 84 yards, 4:15.

Top passers

- DET – Matthew Stafford – 18/32, 205 yards
- SEA – Russell Wilson – 23/30, 224 yards, 2 TD

Top rushers

- DET – Zach Zenner – 11 rushes, 34 yards
- SEA – Thomas Rawls – 27 rushes, 161 yards, TD

Top receivers

- DET – Zach Zenner – 6 receptions, 54 yards
- SEA – Doug Baldwin – 11 receptions, 104 yards, TD

After a scoreless first quarter, the Seahawks opened the scoring in the second quarter via a two-yard touchdown pass from Russell Wilson to Paul Richardson. The Seahawks extended their lead via a 43-yard field goal from Steven Hauschka. The Lions responded with a 51-yard field goal from Matt Prater, which made the score 10–3 in favor of the Seahawks at half-time. The Lions reduced the Seahawks' lead to four points in the third quarter via a 53-yard field goal from Prater. The Seahawks scored 16 points in the fourth quarter via a 27-yard field goal from Hauschka, a four-yard touchdown run from Thomas Rawls, and a 13-yard touchdown pass from Wilson to Doug Baldwin, making the final score 26–6 in favor of Seattle, and ending the Lions' season. The loss marked the Lions' ninth consecutive playoff game without a win, the longest streak in NFL history.

== Standings ==
=== Division ===
NFC North
	W	L	T	PCT	DIV	CONF	PF	PA	STK
^{(4)} Green Bay Packers	10	6	0	.625	5–1	8–4	432	388	W6
^{(6)} Detroit Lions	9	7	0	.563	3–3	7–5	346	358	L3
Minnesota Vikings	8	8	0	.500	2–4	5–7	327	307	W1
Chicago Bears	3	13	0	.188	2–4	3–9	279	399	L4

=== Conference ===
NFC
#	Team	Division	W	L	T	PCT	DIV	CONF	SOS	SOV	STK
Division leaders
1	Dallas Cowboys	East	13	3	0	.813	3–3	9–3	.471	.440	L1
2	Atlanta Falcons	South	11	5	0	.688	5–1	9–3	.480	.452	W4
3	Seattle Seahawks	West	10	5	1	.656	3–2–1	6–5–1	.441	.425	W1
4	Green Bay Packers	North	10	6	0	.625	5–1	8–4	.508	.453	W6
Wild Cards
5	New York Giants	East	11	5	0	.688	4–2	8–4	.486	.455	W1
6 (Note: Detroit finished ahead of Tampa Bay for the No. 6 seed and qualified for the last playoff spot based on record vs. common opponents—Detroit's cumulative record against Chicago, Dallas, Los Angeles and New Orleans was 3–2, while Tampa Bay's cumulative record against the same four teams was 2–3.)	Detroit Lions	North	9	7	0	.563	3–3	7–5	.475	.392	L3
Did not qualify for the postseason
7	Tampa Bay Buccaneers	South	9	7	0	.563	4–2	7–5	.492	.434	W1
8	Washington Redskins	East	8	7	1	.531	3–3	6–6	.516	.430	L1
9	Minnesota Vikings	North	8	8	0	.500	2–4	5–7	.492	.457	W1
10	Arizona Cardinals	West	7	8	1	.469	4–1–1	6–5–1	.463	.366	W2
11 (Note: New Orleans finished ahead of Philadelphia based on better record vs. conference opponents.)	New Orleans Saints	South	7	9	0	.438	2–4	6–6	.523	.393	L1
12	Philadelphia Eagles	East	7	9	0	.438	2–4	5–7	.559	.518	W2
13	Carolina Panthers	South	6	10	0	.375	1–5	5–7	.518	.354	L2
14	Los Angeles Rams	West	4	12	0	.250	2–4	3–9	.504	.500	L7
15	Chicago Bears	North	3	13	0	.188	2–4	3–9	.521	.396	L4
16	San Francisco 49ers	West	2	14	0	.125	2–4	2–10	.504	.250	L1
Tiebreakers (Note: When breaking ties for three or more teams under the NFL's rules, they are first broken within divisions, then comparing only the highest-ranked remaining team from each division.)

== Staff ==
2016 Detroit Lions staff
Front office: Owner/chairman – Martha Firestone Ford; Vice chairman – William Clay Ford Jr.; President – Rod Wood; Special advisor to the president – Ernie Accorsi; COO – Allison Maki; Executive vice president/general manager – Bob Quinn; Vice president of football administration – Matt Harriss; Chief of staff/assistant to the general manager – Kevin Anderson; Director of player personnel – Kyle O'Brien; Senior personnel executive – Brian Xanders; Director of college scouting – Lance Newmark; Director of pro scouting – Brendan Prophett; Assistant director of pro personnel – Rob Lohman; Head coaches: Head coach – Jim Caldwell; Assistant head coach/offensive line – Ron Prince; Offensive coaches: Offensive coordinator – Jim Bob Cooter; Quarterbacks – Brian Callahan; Running backs – David Walker; Wide receivers – Robert Prince; Tight ends – Al Golden; Offensive assistant/research & analysis – Evan Rothstein; Quality control/offensive line – Michael McCarthy	Defensive coaches: Defensive coordinator – Teryl Austin; Defensive line – Kris Kocurek; Linebackers – Bill Sheridan; Defensive Backs (Safeties) – Alan Williams; Defensive Backs (Corners) – Tony Oden; Senior coaching assistant – Gunther Cunningham; Defensive assistant/defensive ends – Matt Raich; Defensive quality control – Steven Williams; Special teams coaches: Special teams coordinator – Joe Marciano; Special teams assistant – Devin Fitzsimmons; Strength and conditioning: Head strength and conditioning – Harold Nash; Assistant strength and conditioning – Josh Schuler
