= Cre'Von LeBlanc =

American gridiron football player (born 1994)

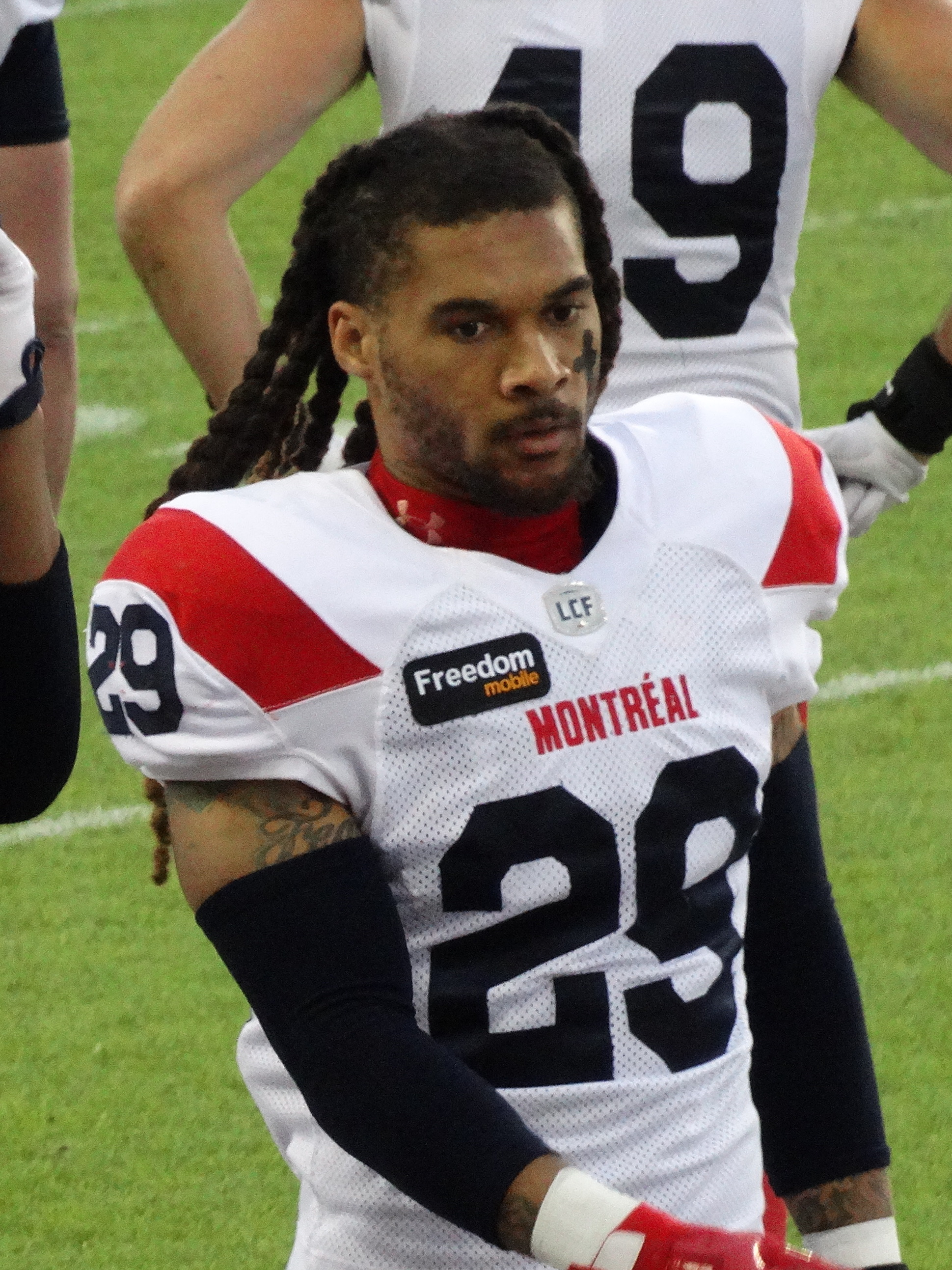
- LeBlanc with the Montreal Alouettes in 2024

Profile
- Position: Defensive back

Personal information
- Born: July 25, 1994 (age 32); Belle Glade, Florida, U.S.
- Listed height: 5 ft 10 in (1.78 m)
- Listed weight: 190 lb (86 kg)

Career information
- High school: Glades Central (Belle Glade, Florida)
- College: Florida Atlantic
- NFL draft: 2016: undrafted

Career history
- New England Patriots (2016)*; Chicago Bears (2016–2017); Detroit Lions (2018); Philadelphia Eagles (2018–2020); Miami Dolphins (2021)*; Houston Texans (2021); New England Patriots (2021)*; Las Vegas Raiders (2022)*; Arlington Renegades (2023); Montreal Alouettes (2024)
- * Offseason or practice squad member only

Awards and highlights
- XFL champion (2023)

Career NFL statistics
- Total tackles: 118
- Sacks: 2.0
- Forced fumbles: 2
- Fumble recoveries: 1
- Pass deflections: 18
- Interceptions: 2
- Defensive touchdowns: 1
- Stats at Pro Football Reference
- Stats at CFL.ca

Cre'Von Lashaad LeBlanc (born July 25, 1994) is an American professional football defensive back. He played college football for the Florida Atlantic Owls. He was signed by the New England Patriots of the National Football League (NFL) as an undrafted free agent and has played for the Chicago Bears, Detroit Lions, and Philadelphia Eagles of the NFL and the Montreal Alouettes of the Canadian Football League (CFL).

== College career ==
LeBlanc played college football at Florida Atlantic.

== Professional career ==
Pre-draft measurables
Height	Weight	Arm length	Hand span	40-yard dash	10-yard split	20-yard split	20-yard shuttle	Three-cone drill	Vertical jump	Broad jump	Bench press
5 ft 9 7/8 in (1.77 m)	185 lb (84 kg)	29 1/4 in (0.74 m)	9 1/8 in (0.23 m)	4.67 s	1.63 s	2.72 s	4.21 s	6.95 s	34.0 in (0.86 m)	9 ft 6 in (2.90 m)	21 reps
All values from Pro Day

=== New England Patriots ===
After going undrafted in the 2016 NFL draft, he was signed by the New England Patriots as a rookie free agent. LeBlanc made a one-handed interception in the endzone in a preseason game against the New Orleans Saints. The interception was named the top play of the 2016 preseason. On September 3, 2016, he was released by the Patriots as part of their final roster cuts with a designation to be added to injured reserve.

=== Chicago Bears ===
On September 4, 2016, LeBlanc was claimed off waivers by the Chicago Bears. On December 11, LeBlanc recorded his first career interception against the Detroit Lions, picking off Matthew Stafford and returning it for a touchdown.

On September 1, 2018, LeBlanc was waived by the Bears.

=== Detroit Lions ===
On September 3, 2018, LeBlanc was signed to the Detroit Lions' practice squad. He was promoted to the active roster on October 6. LeBlanc was waived by Detroit on November 3.

=== Philadelphia Eagles ===
On November 5, 2018, LeBlanc was claimed off waivers by the Philadelphia Eagles. LeBlanc was forced into action in Week 11 during a 48–7 loss to the New Orleans Saints following a litany of injuries in the Eagles' secondary. In an interview with the media following a 16–15 win against the Chicago Bears in the playoffs, LeBlanc was praised by defensive coordinator Jim Schwartz, saying, "I don’t know where we’d be without Cre’Von ... that might have been the key to our season, putting the waiver claim in." In a 20-14 loss to the Saints, LeBlanc recorded an interception against Drew Brees on the very first play of the game. LeBlanc recorded seven tackles, three pass deflections, and an interception over two postseason games, and was given the highest grade of any cornerback in the postseason by Pro Football Focus.

LeBlanc signed a one-year extension with the team on September 2, 2019, and subsequently placed on injured reserve with a foot injury suffered during training camp. He was designated for return from injured reserve on November 26, and began practicing with the team again. LeBlanc was activated on November 30. LeBlanc was given his first start of the season in a Week 17 matchup against the New York Giants, where he responded with a career–high eight total tackles, including a tackle on Saquon Barkley on a 4th down and short, as well as two pass deflections. LeBlanc started the Eagles' Wild Card game against the Seattle Seahawks, where he recorded four tackles and two pass deflections in the 17–9 loss.

The Eagles released LeBlanc on September 6, 2020, but re-signed with the team the next day. He was placed on injured reserve on November 24, with an ankle injury.

=== Miami Dolphins ===
On July 23, 2021, LeBlanc signed with the Miami Dolphins. He was released by the Dolphins on August 31.

=== Houston Texans ===
On September 7, 2021, LeBlanc signed with the Houston Texans. He was promoted to the active roster on October 29. LeBlanc was waived by the Texans on December 4, and subsequently re-signed to the team's practice squad.

=== New England Patriots (second stint) ===
On January 12, 2022, LeBlanc was signed to the New England Patriots' practice squad.

=== Las Vegas Raiders ===
On February 17, 2022, LeBlanc signed a reserve/future contract with the Las Vegas Raiders. He was placed on injured reserve on August 12. LeBlanc was released by Las Vegas on August 23.

=== Arlington Renegades ===
LeBlanc signed with the Arlington Renegades of the XFL in January 2023. He was not part of the roster after the 2024 UFL dispersal draft on January 15, 2024.

=== Montreal Alouettes ===
On April 11, 2024, LeBlanc signed with the Montreal Alouettes of the Canadian Football League (CFL). He played in five regular season games where he recorded four special teams tackles.

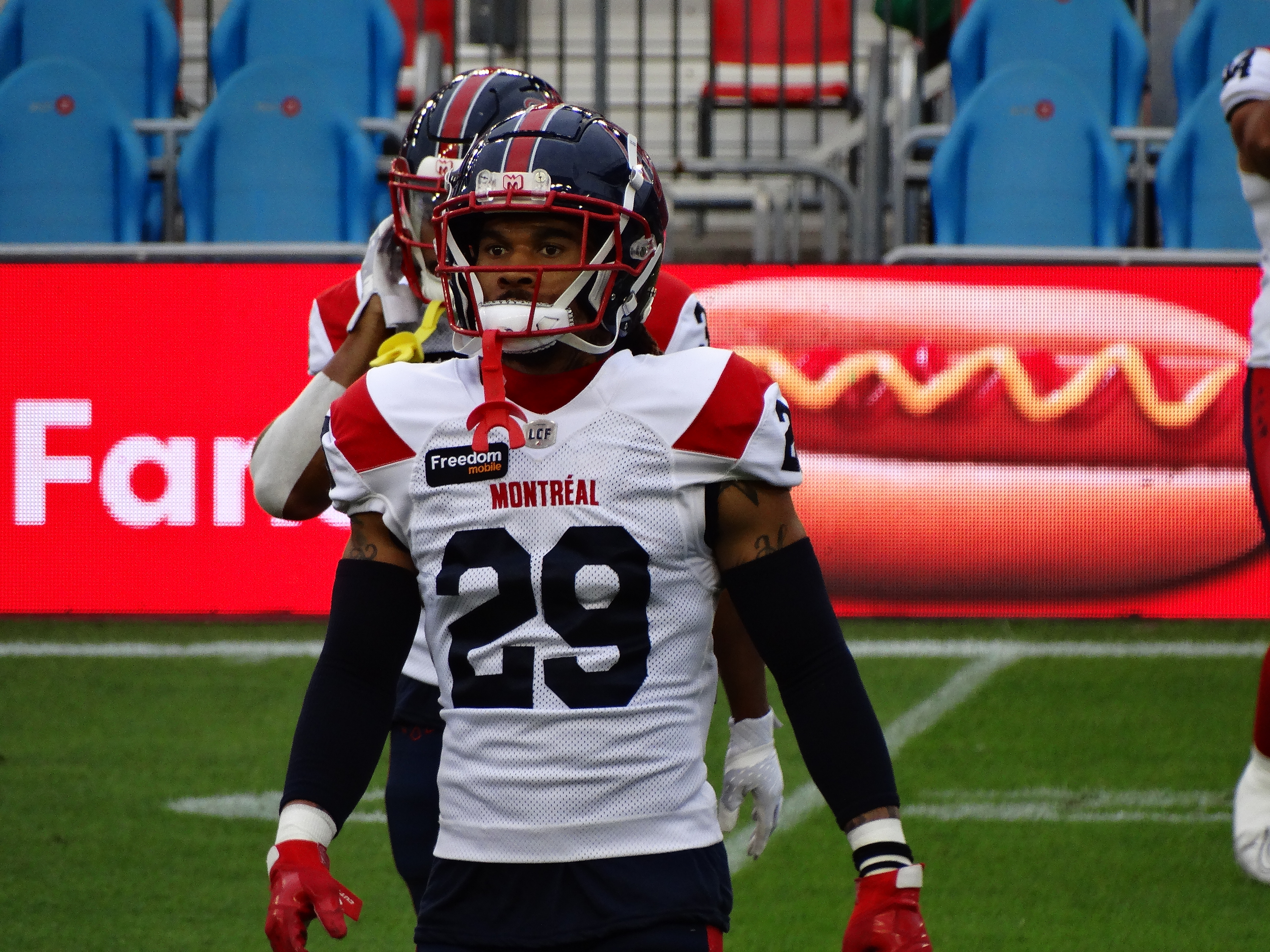
LeBlanc with the Alouettes in 2024

LeBlanc was released in the following off-season on March 28, 2025.

== NFL career statistics ==
Year	Team	Games		Tackles				Interceptions						Fumbles			
Year	Team	GP	GS	Cmb	Solo	Ast	Sck	PD	Int	Yds	Avg	Lng	TD	FF	FR	Yds	TD
2016	CHI	13	9	44	40	4	0.0	10	2	24	12.0	24	1	0	0	0	0
2017	CHI	9	8	17	14	3	1.0	3	0	0	0.0	0	0	1	0	0	0
2018	DET	3	0	3	2	1	0.0	0	0	0	0.0	0	0	0	0	0	0
2018	PHI	8	4	24	20	4	0.0	1	0	0	0.0	0	0	0	0	0	0
2019	PHI	4	1	8	7	1	0.0	2	0	0	0.0	0	0	0	0	0	0
2020	PHI	9	1	22	19	3	1.0	2	0	0	0.0	0	0	1	1	0	0
Career		52	16	118	102	16	2.0	18	2	24	12.0	18	1	2	1	2	0

=== Playoffs ===
Year	Team	Games		Tackles					Interceptions					Fumbles			
Year	Team	GP	GS	Cmb	Solo	Ast	Sck	TFL	Int	Yds	TD	Lng	PD	FF	FR	Yds	TD
2018	PHI	2	1	7	6	1	0.0	0	1	0	0	0	0	0	0	0	0
2019	PHI	1	1	4	3	1	0.0	0	0	0	0	0	0	0	0	0	0
Career		3	2	11	9	2	0.0	0	1	0	0	0	0	0	0	0	0

== Personal life ==
When LeBlanc was a sophomore in high school, his father died of a heart attack at the age of 44. LeBlanc released a rap single on April 16, 2021.
