= Miles Killebrew =

American football player (born 1993)

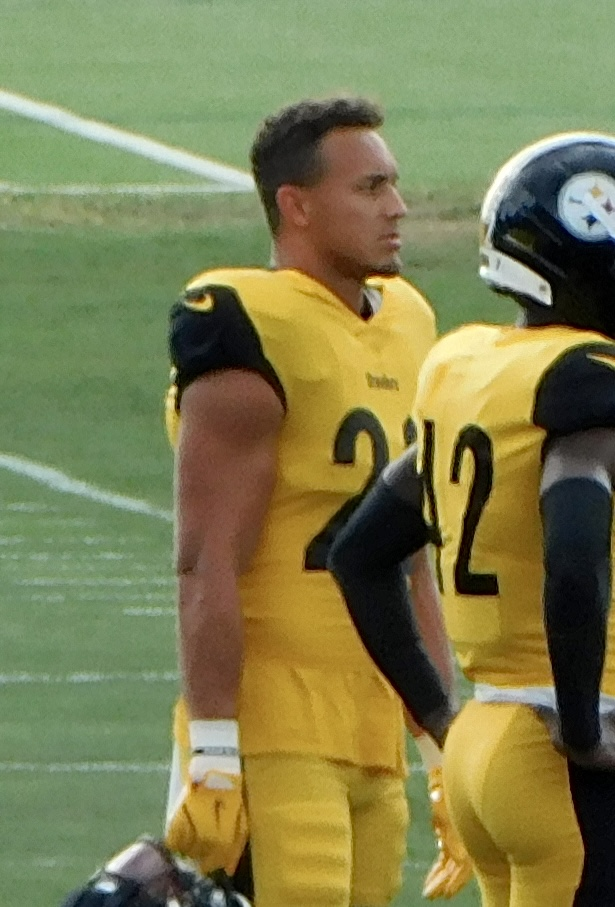
- Killebrew with the Pittsburgh Steelers in 2025

No. 29 – Tampa Bay Buccaneers
- Position: Safety
- Roster status: Active

Personal information
- Born: May 10, 1993 (age 33); Henderson, Nevada, U.S.
- Listed height: 6 ft 2 in (1.88 m)
- Listed weight: 222 lb (101 kg)

Career information
- High school: Foothill (Henderson)
- College: Southern Utah (2011–2015)
- NFL draft: 2016: 4th round, 111th overall pick

Career history
- Detroit Lions (2016–2020); Pittsburgh Steelers (2021–2025); Tampa Bay Buccaneers (2026–present)

Awards and highlights
- First-team All-Pro (2023); 2× Pro Bowl (2023, 2024)

Career NFL statistics as of Week 7, 2026
- Tackles: 173
- Forced fumbles: 2
- Pass deflections: 6
- Interceptions: 2
- Defensive Touchdowns: 1
- Stats at Pro Football Reference

Miles Killebrew (born May 10, 1993) is an American professional football safety and special teamer for the Tampa Bay Buccaneers of the National Football League (NFL). He played college football for the Southern Utah Thunderbirds and was selected by the Detroit Lions in the fourth round of the 2016 NFL draft.

== College career ==
Killebrew reached the triple-digit mark in tackles each of his last two seasons (101 in 2014, 132 in 2015) and also showed an ability to handle pass coverage responsibilities with three interceptions (one returned for a touchdown in 2014) and seven pass breakups in 2015. The four-year starter earned All-Big Sky recognition in each season: honorable mention in 2012 and 2013, second-team in 2014, and first-team in 2015.

== Professional career ==
=== Pre-draft ===
NFL analysts had projected Killebrew to be drafted in the third or fourth rounds. Most teams and scouts were impressed by his size, tackling form, and physical play. The only downsides to him were his lack of instincts, minimal coverage range, and lack of anticipation in run direction. With a large frame for a safety and the popularity of hybrid linebackers in the NFL, a lot of analysts expected him to also play a nickel linebacker role in the NFL. Killebrew played in the Reese's Senior Bowl and was also invited to the NFL Combine. Between the Senior Bowl and the combine, it was reported he met with multiple teams, including the Cincinnati Bengals, Dallas Cowboys, San Diego Chargers, New York Jets, Detroit Lions, and the Indianapolis Colts' head coach Chuck Pagano. On March 30, 2016, he attended Southern Utah's first ever Pro Day and performed the 40-yard dash (4.51), 20-yard dash (2.63), and 10-yard dash (1.58), improving his numbers from the combine on all three. Over twenty scouts and representatives from NFL teams showed up to evaluate Killebrew and ten other prospects at SUU's Pro Day.

Pre-draft measurables
Height	Weight	Arm length	Hand span	Wingspan	40-yard dash	10-yard split	20-yard split	20-yard shuttle	Three-cone drill	Vertical jump	Broad jump	Bench press
6 ft 1 7/8 in (1.88 m)	217 lb (98 kg)	32 1/8 in (0.82 m)	9 1/2 in (0.24 m)	6 ft 4 1/8 in (1.93 m)	4.51 s	1.58 s	2.63 s	4.18 s	6.93 s	38 in (0.97 m)	10 ft 7 in (3.23 m)	22 reps
All values from NFL Combine/Pro Day

=== Detroit Lions ===
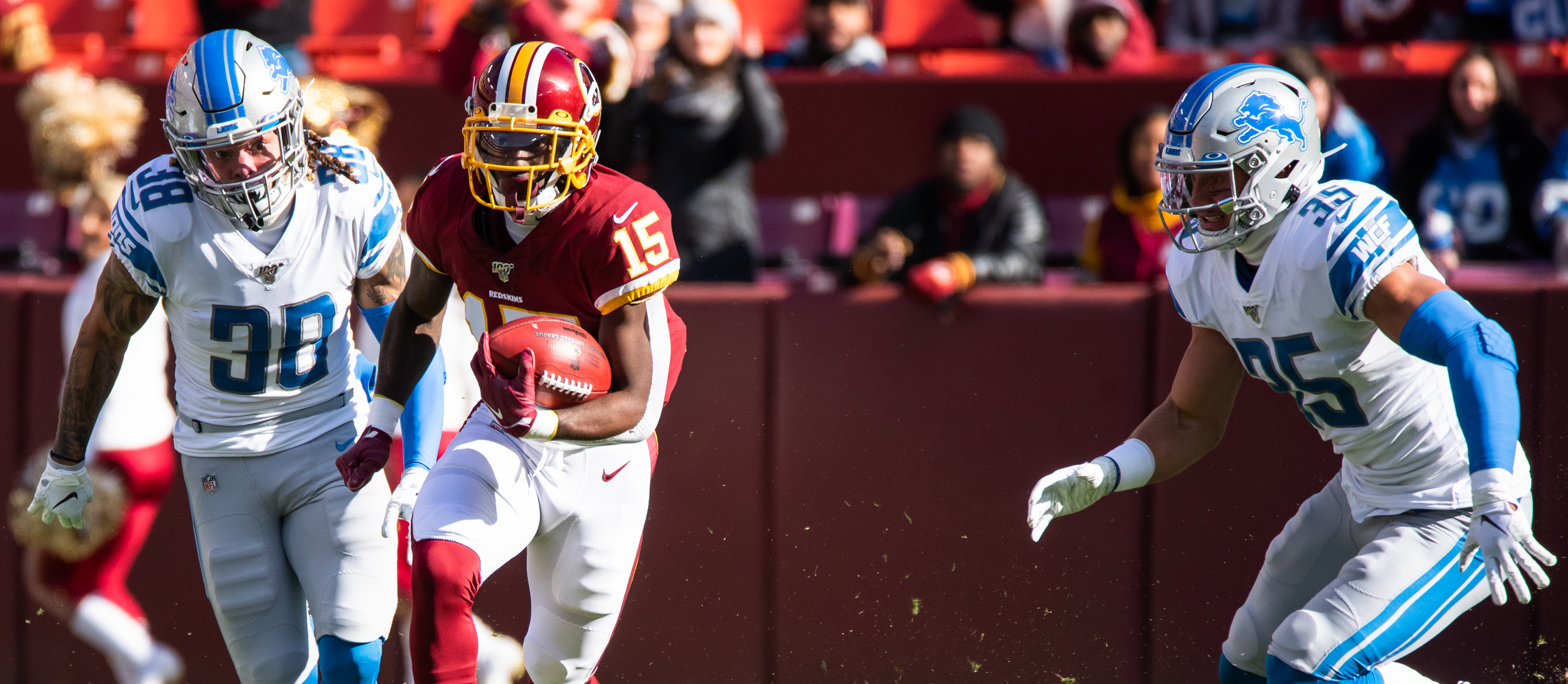
Killebrew in a 2019 game against the Washington Redskins

The Lions selected Killebrew in the fourth round (111th overall) in the 2016 NFL draft. After he had appeared in the senior bowl, the Lions safeties coach, Alan Williams, and other representatives from the organization had a meeting with Killebrew and told him that they were not interested in him, he wasn't a right fit for the team, and that they did not want him at all. Once they drafted him, they told him that they had only said it to see how he would respond. On May 6, 2016, it was reported that the Lions had signed Killebrew to a four-year, $2.34 million contract that includes a signing bonus of $578,564.

He began his rookie season as the Lions' third strong safety on the depth chart behind veterans Tavon Wilson and Rafael Bush. In the first 11 games, Killebrew mainly saw time on special teams and saw a few snaps as a rotational safety on defense. On November 20, 2016, Killebrew led the Lions with five tackles, while only playing 12 defensive snaps, all on third down, during the Lions 26–19 victory over the Jacksonville Jaguars. Four days later, he made four tackles on third down, while only appearing on nine of the Lions' defensive snaps during their 16–13 victory over the Minnesota Vikings on Thanksgiving. On December 4, 2016, he played 21 defensive snaps (34%) during the Lions 28–13 victory against the New Orleans Saints. He finished the game with three solo tackles, a pass deflection, and intercepted Drew Brees for his first career interception.

On September 10, 2017, in the Lions' season opening 35–23 victory over the Arizona Cardinals, Killebrew had a 35-yard interception return for a touchdown, which came off of quarterback Carson Palmer, in the fourth quarter.

During 2018's training camp Killebrew converted to linebacker with the arrival of Matt Patricia and new defensive scheme. Throughout 2018 and 2019, he recorded 27 tackles (seven in 2018, 20 in 2019) across 28 games played. After the 2019 season, the Lions re-signed Killebrew to a one year contract. He recorded 12 total tackles (10 solo, two assisted) After the 2020 season, the Lions opted to not re-sign Killebrew, making him a free agent.

=== Pittsburgh Steelers ===
Killebrew signed a one-year contract with the Pittsburgh Steelers on March 24, 2021.

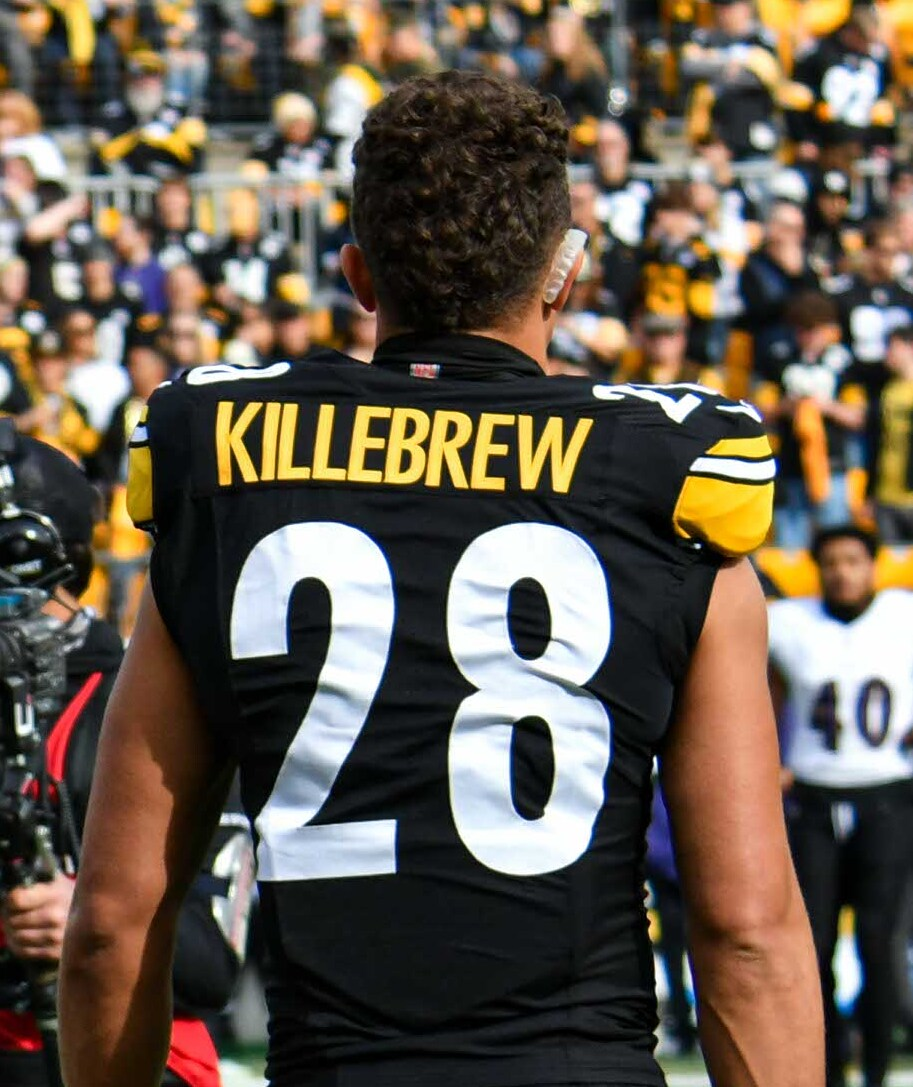
Killebrew before a game in 2024

In week 1 of the 2021 season against the Buffalo Bills, Killebrew blocked a punt from Bills punter Matt Haack which was recovered by teammate Ulysees Gilbert for a Steelers touchdown in the 23–16 win. Later, in week 11 against the Chargers, Killebrew blocked a punt from Chargers punter Ty Long, leading to a rushing touchdown by Steelers running back Najee Harris several plays later in the 37–41 loss.

On March 11, 2022, Killebrew signed a two-year, $4 million contract extension with the Steelers.

During week 5 of the 2023 season against the Baltimore Ravens, Killebrew blocked a punt from Ravens punter Jordan Stout, leading to a Steelers safety in the 17–10 victory. He finished the 2023 season making 21 solo tackles, five assisted tackles, one tackle for loss, and a blocked punt. He appeared in the Steelers' postseason outing against the Buffalo Bills in which the Steelers lost 17-31, ending their season.

On March 18, 2024, Killebrew signed a two-year contract extension with the Steelers. On September 2, Killebrew was announced as a captain for the 2024 season. He was named a Pro Bowler for the second consecutive season as a special teamer, recording 13 combined tackles across 17 games.

In 2025, Killebrew recorded five tackles across Pittsburgh's first five contests. On October 15, 2025, head coach Mike Tomlin announced that Killebrew had suffered a 'significant' knee injury in the team's Week 6 victory over the Cleveland Browns; he was placed on injured reserve the following day.

=== Tampa Bay Buccaneers ===
On March 13, 2026, Killebrew signed a one-year, $1.79 million contract with the Tampa Bay Buccaneers.

== Personal life ==
Killebrew was raised by his parents, Lisa and David Killebrew, in Henderson, Nevada. Killebrew and his family are Indianapolis Colts fans, having lived in Indiana for a few years. He also cites his role models in football as Troy Polamalu, Earl Thomas, and Bob Sanders.

On April 30, 2016, Killebrew graduated from Southern Utah University with a degree in engineering technology. He received the phone call from the Lions telling him they'd drafted him on the way to his graduation ceremony.

In June 2016, a Detroit-based brewery named Fort Street Brewery created Killebrew IPA, a play on words using his last name.
