= Jace Billingsley =

American football player (born 1993)

No. 16
- Position: Wide receiver

Personal information
- Born: May 16, 1993 (age 33); Winnemucca, Nevada, U.S.
- Listed height: 5 ft 9 in (1.75 m)
- Listed weight: 189 lb (86 kg)

Career information
- High school: Lowry (Winnemucca)
- College: Eastern Oregon
- NFL draft: 2016: undrafted

Career history
- Detroit Lions (2016–2017); New England Patriots (2018)*
- * Offseason or practice squad member only

Career NFL statistics
- Total tackles: 2
- Stats at Pro Football Reference

Jace Billingsley (born May 16, 1993) is an American former professional football player who was a wide receiver in the National Football League (NFL). He played college football for the Eastern Oregon Mountaineers, and was signed by the Detroit Lions as an undrafted free agent after the 2016 NFL draft.

== College career ==
In his last season at Eastern Oregon University, Billingsley finished fourth in the country with 1,931 all-purpose yards, 863 rushing yards, and 506 receiving yards.

== Professional career ==
=== Detroit Lions ===
Billingsley signed with the Detroit Lions as an undrafted free agent on May 6, 2016. On September 3, he was waived by the Lions and was re-signed to the practice squad the next day. On December 31, Billingsley was promoted to the active roster, though he was a healthy scratch for the Lions' final regular season game against the Green Bay Packers and playoff game against the Seattle Seahawks.

On September 2, 2017, Billingsley was waived by the Lions and subsequently re-signed to the practice squad the next day. He was promoted to the active roster on October 25. In his second career NFL game, on Monday Night Football against the Green Bay Packers, Billingsley recorded two special teams tackles in the Lions 30-17 victory. He was waived by the Lions on November 11. Billingsley was re-signed by the Lions on November 14. He was waived again on November 22, and later re-signed to the practice squad. Billingsley was promoted back to the active roster on December 29.

On September 1, 2018, Billingsley was waived by the Lions.

=== New England Patriots ===
On September 4, 2018, Billingsley was signed to the New England Patriots' practice squad. He was released on September 12, and was re-signed six days later. Billingsley was released by New England again on September 26.
