= Rafael Bush =

American football player (born 1987)

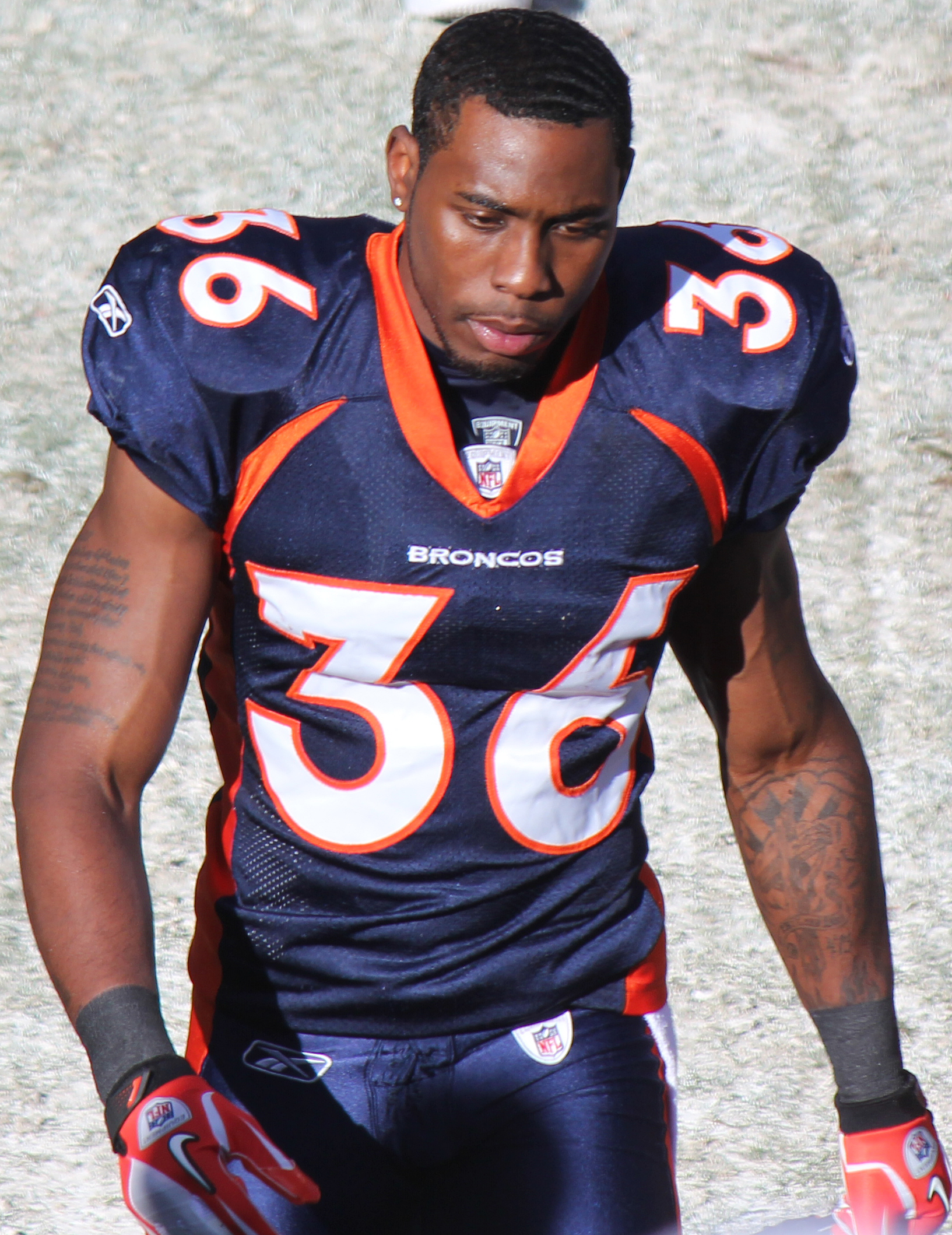
- Bush with the Broncos in 2011

No. 36, 25, 31, 20
- Position: Safety

Personal information
- Born: May 12, 1987 (age 39); Williston, South Carolina, U.S.
- Listed height: 5 ft 11 in (1.80 m)
- Listed weight: 200 lb (91 kg)

Career information
- High school: Williston-Elko
- College: South Carolina State
- NFL draft: 2010: undrafted

Career history
- Atlanta Falcons (2010–2011); Denver Broncos (2011); New Orleans Saints (2012–2015); Detroit Lions (2016); New Orleans Saints (2017); Buffalo Bills (2018)

Career NFL statistics
- Total tackles: 242
- Sacks: 3.5
- Forced fumbles: 1
- Fumble recoveries: 3
- Interceptions: 3
- Defensive touchdowns: 1
- Stats at Pro Football Reference

Rafael Bush (born May 12, 1987) is an American former professional football player who was a safety in the National Football League (NFL). He played college football for the South Carolina State Bulldogs and was signed by the Atlanta Falcons as an undrafted free agent in 2010. He was also a member of the Denver Broncos, New Orleans Saints, Detroit Lions, and Buffalo Bills.

== Professional career ==
=== Atlanta Falcons ===
After going undrafted in the 2010 NFL draft, Bush signed with the Atlanta Falcons on April 26, 2010. He was released on September 4, 2010 and signed to the Falcons' practice squad the next day. The team promoted him to the active roster on December 29, 2010. He was released during final cuts on September 3, 2011, but re-signed to the practice squad the following day.

=== Denver Broncos ===
On October 17, 2011, Bush was signed away from the Falcons' practice squad by the Denver Broncos.

=== New Orleans Saints (first stint) ===
On September 1, 2012, Bush was signed by the New Orleans Saints. Bush was noted for wearing #25 with the team, which was notably worn by Reggie Bush during the latter's tenure with the team.

Bush was a restricted free agent after the 2013 season, and he signed an offer sheet with the Falcons that would have returned him to Atlanta for reported compensation of about $4.5 million for two years. However, on April 7, 2014, the Saints exercised their right to match the Falcons' offer and bring Bush back to New Orleans. During the 2015 season, he played in the Saints' season opener at Arizona before being placed on injured reserve for the remainder of the season at the recommendation of Dr. Charlie Sommerfeld.

=== Detroit Lions ===
On March 12, 2016, the Detroit Lions signed Bush to a one-year contract. In Week 6 against the Los Angeles Rams, Bush made his first interception as a Lion. The Rams were trailing by 3 in the two minute warning of the 4th quarter, and Bush intercepted Case Keenum, which sealed the victory for the Lions. Bush scored his first career touchdown against the Jacksonville Jaguars in Week 11. He picked off a tipped pass, and returned it for 39 yards and a touchdown. Bush's interception was first in the video Top 10 Most Athletic Plays of Week 11 on NFL.com.

=== New Orleans Saints (second stint) ===
On March 30, 2017, Bush signed with the Saints. He recorded 23 tackles during the year.

=== Buffalo Bills ===
On March 14, 2018, Bush signed a two year, $4.5 million contract with the Buffalo Bills.

On July 19, 2019, Bush announced his retirement from the NFL.

=== NFL statistics ===
Year	Team	GP	COMB	TOTAL	AST	SACK	FF	FR	FR YDS	INT	IR YDS	AVG IR	LNG	TD	PD
2011	DEN	6	3	3	0	0.0	0	0	0	0	0	0	0	0	0
2012	NO	16	18	14	4	0.0	1	2	1	1	40	40	40	0	1
2013	NO	13	42	30	12	0.0	0	1	0	0	0	0	0	0	5
2014	NO	10	55	44	11	0.0	0	0	0	0	0	0	0	0	3
2015	NO	1	1	2	2	0.0	0	0	0	0	0	0	0	0	0
2016	DET	16	53	34	19	1.0	0	0	0	2	39	19.5	39	1	3
2017	NO	14	23	17	6	1.0	0	0	0	0	0	0	0	0	1
2018	BUF	15	45	30	15	1.5	0	0	0	0	0	0	0	0	0
Career		91	242	174	68	3.5	1	3	0	3	79	40	26	1	12
