= Jimmy Landes =

American football player (born 1992)

No. 42
- Position: Long snapper

Personal information
- Born: August 13, 1992 (age 34); Tyler, Texas, U.S.
- Listed height: 6 ft 1 in (1.85 m)
- Listed weight: 252 lb (114 kg)

Career information
- High school: Robert E. Lee (Tyler, Texas)
- College: Baylor (2012–2015)
- NFL draft: 2016: 6th round, 210th overall pick

Career history
- Detroit Lions (2016)
- Stats at Pro Football Reference

Jimmy Landes (born August 13, 1992) is an American former professional football long snapper. He played college football at Baylor University and was selected by the Detroit Lions in the sixth round of the 2016 NFL draft.

== Professional career ==
Pre-draft measurables
Height	Weight	Arm length	Hand span	40-yard dash	10-yard split	20-yard split	20-yard shuttle	Three-cone drill	Vertical jump	Broad jump
6 ft 1 1/4 in (1.86 m)	240 lb (109 kg)	30 3/8 in (0.77 m)	9 5/8 in (0.24 m)	4.97 s	1.66 s	2.79 s	4.38 s	7.05 s	27.5 in (0.70 m)	9 ft 2 in (2.79 m)

Landes was selected by the Detroit Lions in the sixth round, 210th overall, in the 2016 NFL draft. On August 29, 2016, Landes was placed on injured reserve with a shoulder injury.

On June 15, 2017, Landes was released by the Lions.
