= Joe Dahl =

American football player (born 1993)

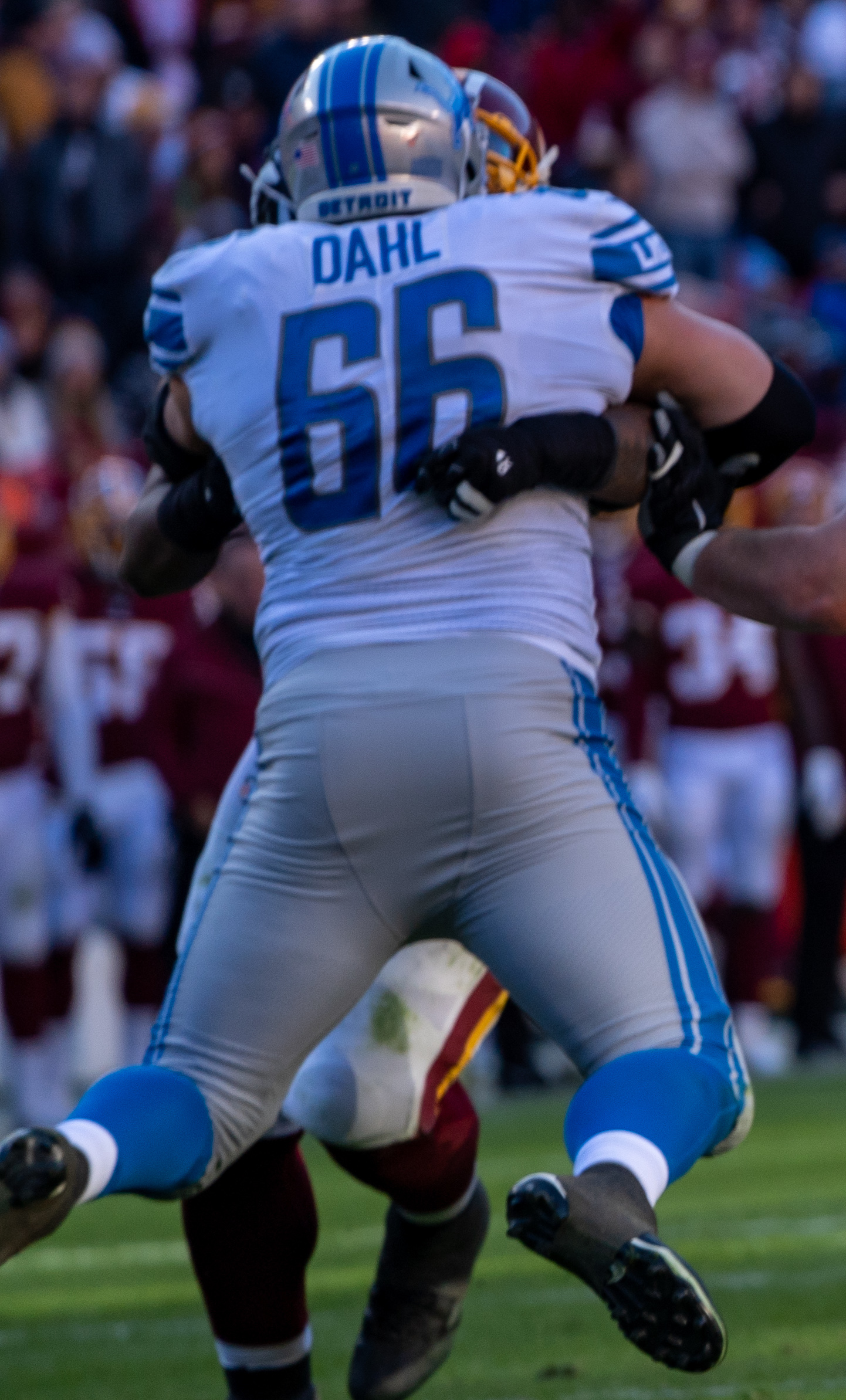
- Dahl with the Detroit Lions in 2019

No. 66
- Position: Guard

Personal information
- Born: April 9, 1993 (age 33); Spokane, Washington, U.S.
- Listed height: 6 ft 4 in (1.93 m)
- Listed weight: 310 lb (141 kg)

Career information
- High school: University (Spokane)
- College: Washington State
- NFL draft: 2016: 5th round, 151st overall pick

Career history
- Detroit Lions (2016–2020)

Awards and highlights
- Second-team All-American (2015); First-team All-Pac-12 (2015)

Career NFL statistics
- Games played: 44
- Games started: 21
- Stats at Pro Football Reference

Joe Dahl (born April 9, 1993) is an American former professional football player who was a guard in the National Football League (NFL). He played college football for the Washington State Cougars. He was selected by the Detroit Lions in the fifth round of the 2016 NFL draft.

== College career ==
After graduating from University High School and spending one year at the University of Montana and another sitting out as a transfer student, Dahl stepped into the starting lineup for Washington State and stayed there for the next three years. He started at left guard in 2013 before moving out to left tackle for their bowl game. He stayed at left tackle the next two seasons. He earned first-team All-Pac-12 Conference and USA Today second-team All-American accolades at left tackle in 2015.

== Professional career ==
Pre-draft measurables
Height	Weight	Arm length	Hand span	40-yard dash	10-yard split	20-yard split	20-yard shuttle	Three-cone drill	Vertical jump	Broad jump	Bench press
6 ft 4 1/8 in (1.93 m)	304 lb (138 kg)	33 1/8 in (0.84 m)	9 1/8 in (0.23 m)	5.18 s	1.81 s	3.18 s	4.77 s	7.64 s	31 in (0.79 m)	9 ft 1 in (2.77 m)	28 reps
All values from NFL Combine

Dahl was selected by the Detroit Lions in the fifth round, 151st overall, of the 2016 NFL draft.

In his rookie season, he played in six games.

On September 26, 2017, Dahl was placed on injured reserve with a leg injury. He was activated off injured reserve to the active roster on December 9, 2017.

On August 6, 2019, Dahl signed a two-year contract extension with the Lions. He was named the Lions starting left guard to begin the season. He started the first 13 games before being placed on injured reserve on December 14, 2019.

On September 19, 2020, Dahl was placed on injured reserve. He was activated on October 17. He was released after the season with a "failed physical" designation on March 15, 2021.
