= Antwione Williams =

American football player (born 1993)

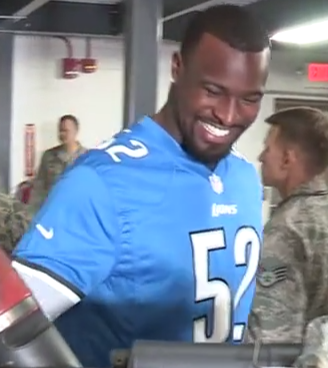
- Williams with the Detroit Lions in 2016

No. 52, 56, 49, 55
- Position: Linebacker

Personal information
- Born: May 26, 1993 (age 33); Birmingham, Alabama, U.S.
- Listed height: 6 ft 3 in (1.91 m)
- Listed weight: 240 lb (109 kg)

Career information
- High school: Lovejoy (Hampton, Georgia)
- College: Georgia Southern (2011–2015)
- NFL draft: 2016: 5th round, 169th overall pick

Career history
- Detroit Lions (2016); Minnesota Vikings (2017)*; Seattle Seahawks (2018)*; Carolina Panthers (2018)*; DC Defenders (2020)
- * Offseason or practice squad member only

Career NFL statistics
- Total tackles: 27
- Fumble recoveries: 1
- Stats at Pro Football Reference

Leander Antwione Williams (born May 26, 1993) is an American former professional football player who was a linebacker for the Detroit Lions of the National Football League (NFL). He played college football for the Georgia Southern Eagles, and was selected by the Lions in the fifth round of the 2016 NFL draft.

== Early life ==
Williams attended Lovejoy High School where he was a two-tme All-Regional selection. He was named All-county and All-South Crescent in 2009 and 2010. For his career, he recorded 63 tackles (14 solo), eight tackles-for-loss, three sacks, four interceptions, eight passes defensed, two blocked kicks and one touchdown.

== College career ==
Williams then attended Georgia Southern University where he majored in psychology.

As a freshman in 2011, he appeared in 11 games, starting three at linebacker. He finished the season with 25 tackles and one tackle-for-loss. In 2012 as a sophomore, he appeared in 14 games, starting six. He recorded 32 tackles (17 solo) and three passes defensed. He then missed the 2013 with an injury and was given a medical redshirt. In 2014, he returned as a redshirt junior and started all 12 games. He finished second on the team with 65 tackles (44 solo), eight tackles-for-loss, three sacks, one forced fumble and four passes defensed. For the season, he was named an All-Sun Belt Conference honorable mention. He also was named to the Dean's list in the spring and was a member of the Eagle Honor Roll for the spring as well. As a redshirt senior in 2015, he started all 13 games. He recorded 107 tackles (48 solo), 10.5 tackles-for-loss, four sacks, four forced fumbles, two quarterback hurries and three passes defensed. After the season, he was named an All-Sun Belt honorable mention selection.

=== College statistics ===
Year	Team	Games		Tackles				Sacks	Pass defense		Fumbles		Safeties	TDs
Year	Team	GP	GS	Solo	Ast	Total	TFL	Sacks	Int	PD	FF	FR	Safeties	TDs
2011	Georgia Southern	11	3	--	--	25	1	0	0	0	0	0	0	0
2012	Georgia Southern	14	6	17	15	32	--	0	0	3	0	0	0	0
2013	Georgia Southern	(redshirt) Redshirted												
2014	Georgia Southern	12	12	44	19	65	8	3	0	4	1	0	0	0
2015	Georgia Southern	13	13	48	59	107	10.5	4	0	3	4	0	0	0
Career		50	34	--	--	229	19.5	7	0	10	5	0	0	0

== Professional career ==
Pre-draft measurables
Height	Weight	40-yard dash	10-yard split	20-yard split	20-yard shuttle	Three-cone drill	Vertical jump	Broad jump	Bench press
6 ft 3 in (1.91 m)	240 lb (109 kg)	4.80 s	1.70 s	2.89 s	4.58 s	7.03 s	35 in (0.89 m)	9 ft 10 in (3.00 m)	23 reps
All values from Pro Day

Williams was selected by the Detroit Lions in the fifth round (169th overall) of the 2016 NFL draft. On May 6, he signed his four-year rookie contract. He played 14 games for the Lions in 2016, recording 17 solo tackles, 27 total tackles, and one QB hit on the season. On September 2, 2017, Williams was waived by the Lions.

On September 13, Williams was signed to the practice squad of the Minnesota Vikings. He signed a reserve/future contract with the Vikings on January 22, 2018. On August 31, Williams was waived by the Vikings.

On September 3, Williams was signed to the Seattle Seahawks' practice squad, but was released two days later.

On December 19, Williams was signed to the Carolina Panthers practice squad. He signed a reserve/future contract with the Panthers on December 31. He was waived during final roster cuts on August 30, 2019.

Williams was signed by the DC Defenders of the XFL during mini-camp in December 2019. He was waived on February 29, 2020.

== Personal life ==
In August 2020, Williams began attending Atlanta's John Marshall Law School and graduated in May 2023 with a Juris Doctor degree.

On November 7, 2024, Williams was charged with felonies of civil disorder and assaulting, resisting or impeding police, along with several lesser misdemeanor charges, in connection with the January 6 riots at the US Capitol. On January 20, 2025, he was among those pardoned by President Trump for their actions in the January 6 attack.

== See also ==
- List of cases of the January 6 United States Capitol attack (T-Z)
- Criminal proceedings in the January 6 United States Capitol attack
- List of people granted executive clemency in the second Trump presidency
