= Dwayne Washington (American football) =

American football player (born 1994)

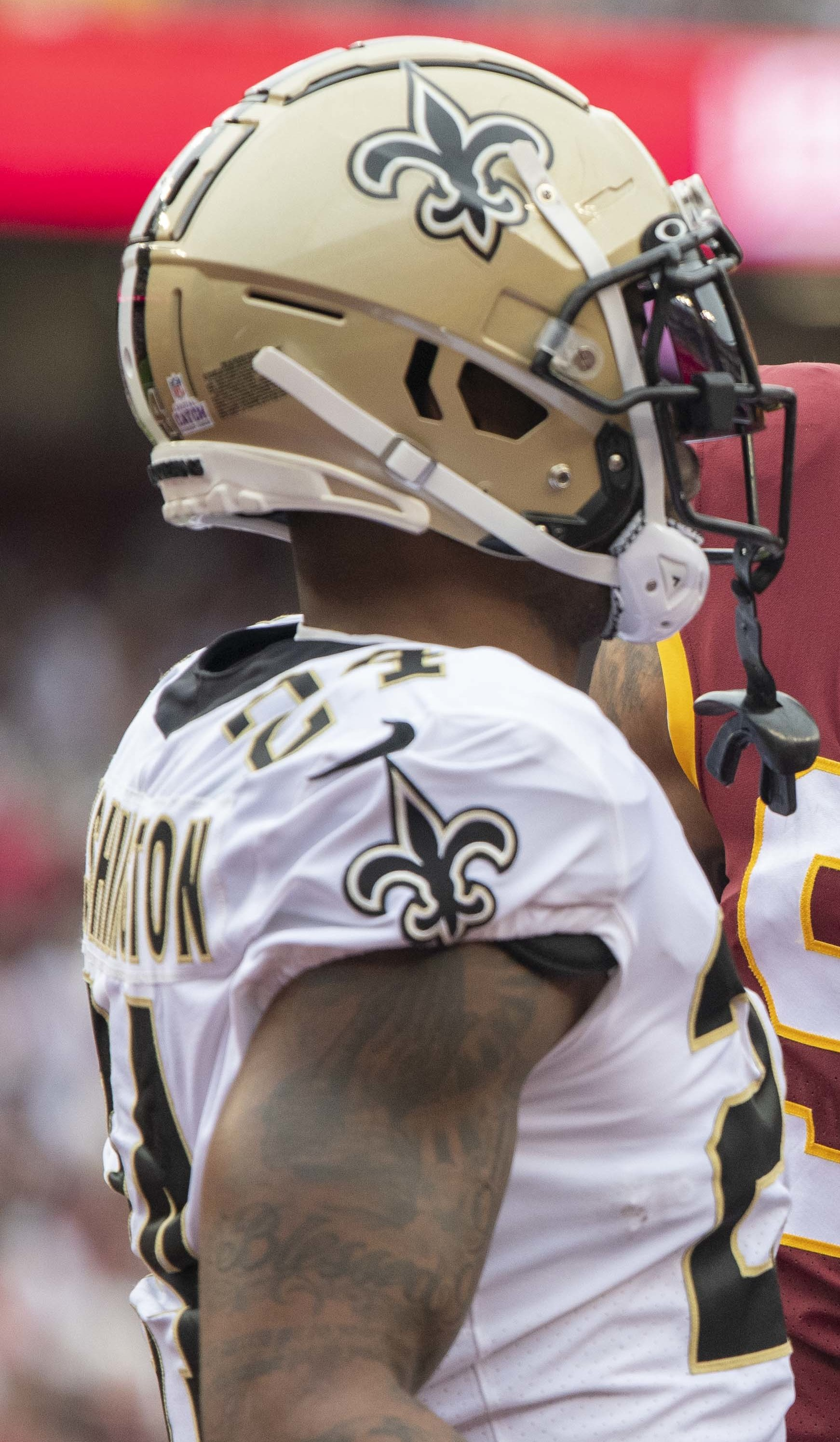
- Washington with the New Orleans Saints in 2021

Profile
- Position: Running back

Personal information
- Born: April 24, 1994 (age 32); Lakewood, California, U.S.
- Listed height: 6 ft 1 in (1.85 m)
- Listed weight: 223 lb (101 kg)

Career information
- High school: Gahr (Cerritos, California)
- College: Washington (2012–2015)
- NFL draft: 2016: 7th round, 236th overall pick

Career history
- Detroit Lions (2016–2017); New Orleans Saints (2018–2022); Denver Broncos (2023)

Career NFL statistics as of 2023
- Rushing yards: 592
- Rushing average: 3.5
- Rushing touchdowns: 1
- Receptions: 16
- Receiving yards: 101
- Stats at Pro Football Reference

Dwayne Washington (born April 24, 1994) is an American professional football running back. He played college football for the Washington Huskies. He was selected by the Detroit Lions in the seventh round of the 2016 NFL draft.

== Early life ==
Washington attended and played high school football at Gahr High School in Cerritos, California.

== College career ==
Washington played for the University of Washington from 2012 to 2015. Washington redshirted in his first year with the program. In the 2013 season, he had 47 rushing attempts for 332 yards and four touchdowns. In addition, he made one five-yard touchdown reception. In the 2014 season, he had 132 rushing attempts for 697 yards and nine touchdowns. In addition, he had 15 receptions for 91 yards. He played in nine games for the Washington Huskies during the 2015 season, rushing for 282 yards on 47 carries and catching 25 passes for another 315 yards and three touchdowns. He missed the final four games of the season, including the team's bowl game, due to a knee injury.

=== Statistics ===
Year	School	Conf	Class	Pos	G	Rushing				Receiving			
Year	School	Conf	Class	Pos	G	Att	Yds	Avg	TD	Rec	Yds	Avg	TD
2013	Washington	Pac-12	FR	RB	11	47	332	7.1	4	1	5	5.0	1
2014	Washington	Pac-12	SO	HB	12	132	697	5.3	9	15	91	6.1	0
2015	Washington	Pac-12	JR	RB	8	47	282	6.0	4	25	315	12.6	3
Career					31	226	1,311	5.8	17	41	411	10.0	4

== Professional career ==
Pre-draft measurables
Height	Weight	Arm length	Hand span	40-yard dash	10-yard split	20-yard split	20-yard shuttle	Three-cone drill	Vertical jump	Broad jump	Bench press
6 ft 0 in (1.83 m)	223 lb (101 kg)	32 3/8 in (0.82 m)	9 7/8 in (0.25 m)	4.44 s	1.58 s	2.60 s	4.24 s	6.90 s	37.5 in (0.95 m)	10 ft 7 in (3.23 m)	21 reps
All values from Pro Day

=== Detroit Lions ===
Washington was selected in the seventh round with the 236th overall pick by the Detroit Lions in the 2016 NFL draft. Overall, in his rookie season, he finished with 90 carries for 265 rushing yards and a rushing touchdown. In the 2017 season, he recorded 20 carries for 44 yards and had a larger role on special teams.

On September 1, 2018, Washington was waived by the Lions.

=== New Orleans Saints ===
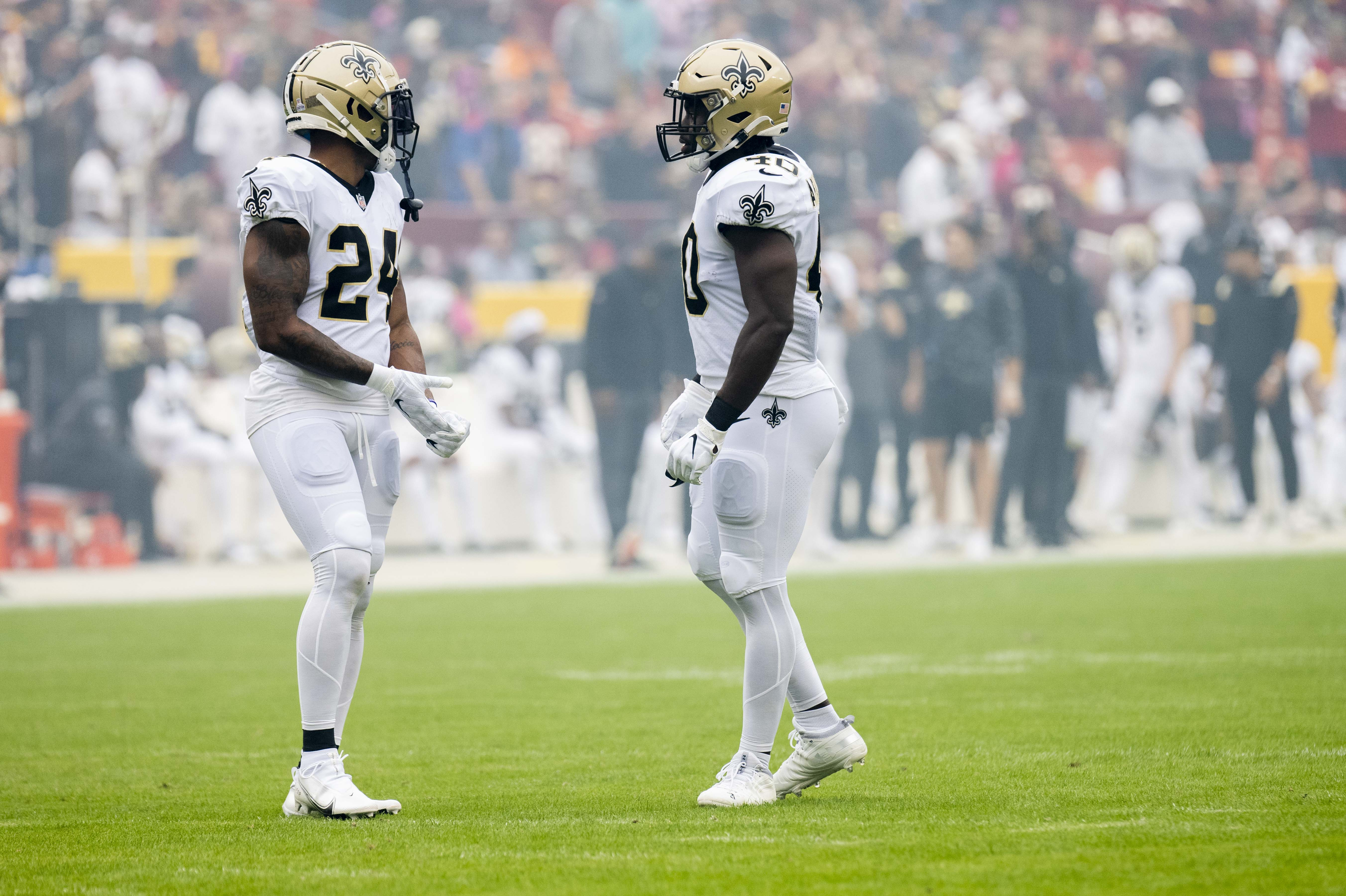
Washington (left) and fullback Alexander Armah playing for the Saints in 2021.

On September 2, 2018, Washington was signed to the New Orleans Saints' practice squad. He was promoted to the active roster on September 28, 2018. He recorded 27 carries for 154 rushing yards in 13 games on the 2018 season, a majority which came against the Carolina Panthers in Week 17. In addition, he was a contributor on special teams. Overall, in the 2019 season, he recorded eight carries for 60 rushing yards to go along with a role on special teams.

Washington re-signed with the Saints on April 16, 2020. He was placed on the reserve/COVID-19 list by the team on August 30, 2020. He was activated on September 17, 2020. He was placed back on the COVID-19 list on January 2, 2021, and activated on January 6. In the 2020 season, he appeared in 11 games and mainly played on special teams.

On March 10, 2021, Washington signed a one-year contract extension with the Saints. He appeared in 14 games in the 2021 season and mainly had a special teams role.

On April 18, 2022, Washington signed another one-year contract with the Saints. Washington played in 12 games and mainly played in a special teams role in the 2022 season.

=== Denver Broncos ===
On August 16, 2023, Washington signed with the Denver Broncos. He was released on August 29, 2023 and re-signed to the practice squad. He was promoted to the active roster on October 4.
