= 2018 Detroit Lions season =

NFL team season

- Owner: Martha Firestone Ford
- General manager: Bob Quinn
- Head coach: Matt Patricia
- Home stadium: Ford Field

Results
- Record: 6–10
- Division place: 4th NFC North
- Playoffs: Did not qualify
- Pro Bowlers: CB Darius Slay; LS Don Muhlbach

Uniform
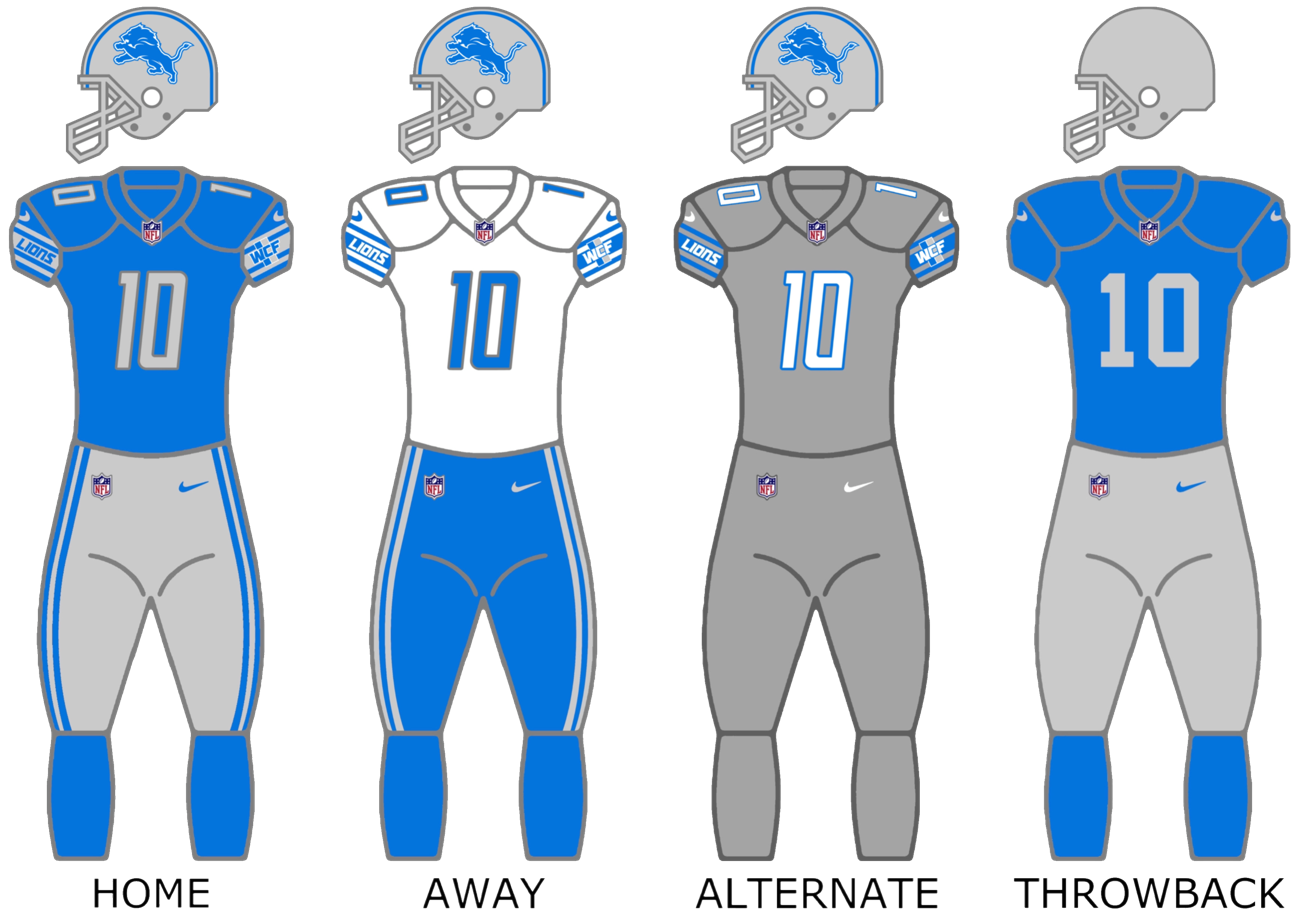

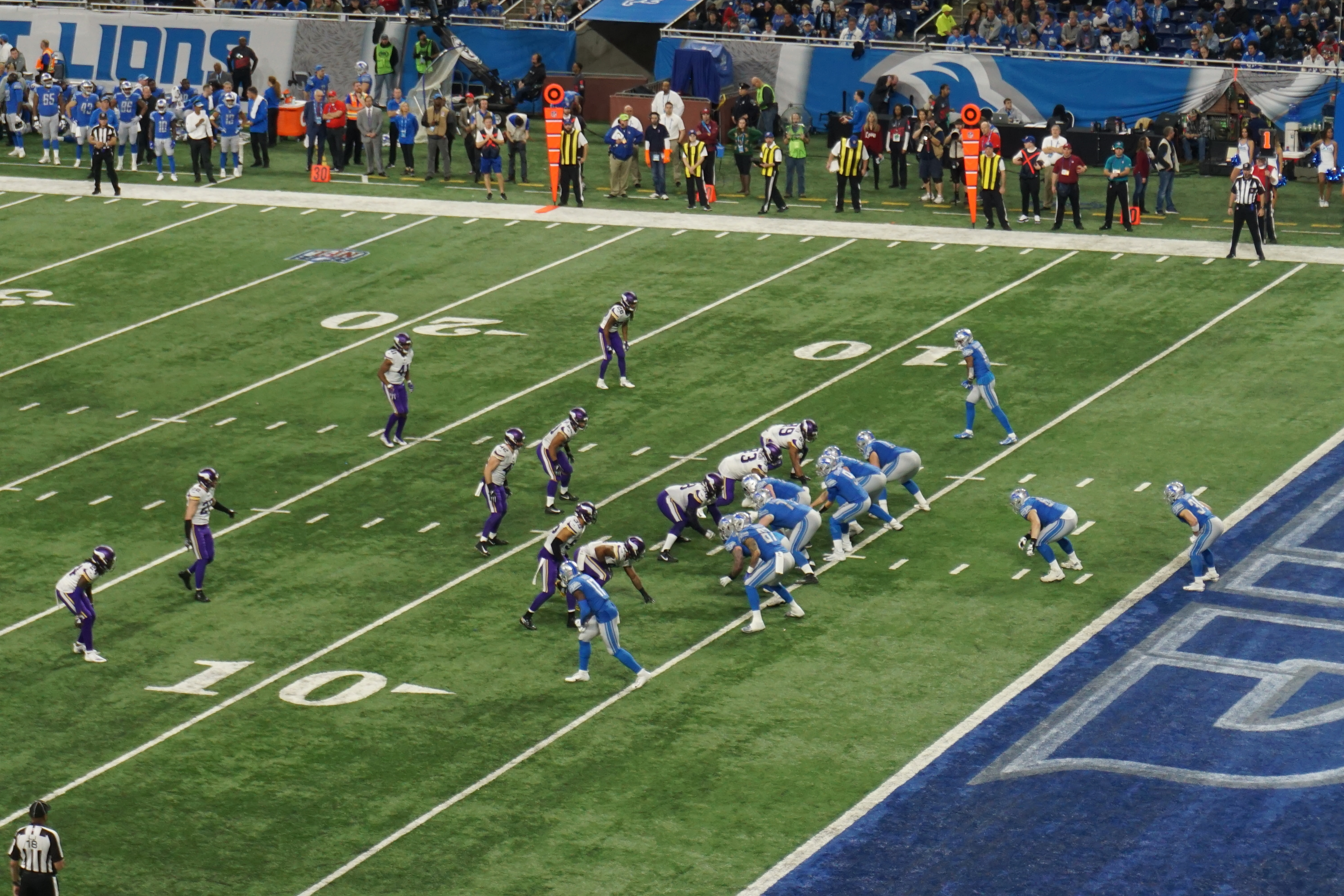
Detroit in action against Minnesota

The 2018 season was the Detroit Lions' 89th in the National Football League (NFL) and their first under a new coaching staff led by head coach Matt Patricia. With their loss to the Los Angeles Rams in Week 13, the Lions failed to improve on their 9–7 campaign from the season before. With their Week 15 loss to the Buffalo Bills, the Lions clinched their first losing season since 2015, making this also their first losing season in the post-Calvin Johnson era. They also missed the playoffs for the second consecutive season and finished last in the NFC North for the first time since 2012 with a 6–10 record.

Despite the disappointing season, the Lions were able to upset the defending back-to-back AFC and eventual Super Bowl Champion New England Patriots 26–10 during Week 3, marking their first win over the Patriots since 2000, which was also the first year of the Brady–Belichick era. The Lions were also able to sweep the Green Bay Packers for the second straight year.

== Offseason ==
=== Coaching staff ===
- On January 1, the Lions fired head coach Jim Caldwell and assistant head coach/offensive line coach Ron Prince.
- On February 5, the day after Super Bowl LII, the Lions hired former New England Patriots defensive coordinator Matt Patricia as head coach.
- On February 7, the Lions hired David Corrao as Director of Football Research, Jeff Davidson as offensive line coach, George Godsey as quarterbacks coach, Al Golden as linebackers coach, Paul Pasqualoni as defensive coordinator, Brian Stewart as defensive backs coach and Chris White as tight ends coach.

=== Re-signings ===
| Date | Player | Position | Contract | Source |
|---|---|---|---|---|
| March 10 | Don Muhlbach | Long snapper | 1 year / $1.105 million | |
| March 10 | Kerry Hyder | Defensive end | 1 year / $555,000 | |
| March 13 | Tavon Wilson | Safety | 2 years / $7 million | |
| March 14 | Nick Bellore | Linebacker/Fullback | 1 year / $1.005 million | |
| March 14 | Nevin Lawson | Cornerback | 2 years / $9.2 million | |
| March 14 | Jake Rudock | Quarterback | 1 year / $630,000 | |
| March 16 | Zach Zenner | Running back | 1 year / $1.05 million | |
| April 9 | T. J. Jones | Wide receiver | 1 year / $1.907 million | |

=== Additions ===
| Date | Player | Position | Previous team | Contract | Source |
|---|---|---|---|---|---|
| March 14 | DeShawn Shead | Cornerback | Seattle Seahawks | 1 year / $3.5 million | |
| March 15 | Christian Jones | Linebacker | Chicago Bears | 2 years / $7.75 million | |
| March 15 | Devon Kennard | Linebacker | New York Giants | 3 years / $18.75 million | |
| March 15 | Kenny Wiggins | Guard | Los Angeles Chargers | 2 years / $5 million | |
| March 16 | LeGarrette Blount | Running back | Philadelphia Eagles | 1 year / $4.5 million | |
| March 21 | Luke Willson | Tight end | Seattle Seahawks | 1 year / $2.5 million | |
| March 21 | Sylvester Williams | Defensive tackle | Tennessee Titans | 1 year / $3.5 million | |
| March 26 | Jonathan Freeny | Linebacker | New Orleans Saints | 1 year / $880,000 | |
| March 29 | Wesley Johnson | Center | New York Jets | 1 year / $880,000 | |
| March 29 | Levine Toilolo | Tight end | Atlanta Falcons | 1 year / $1.5 million | |
| April 4 | Matt Cassel | Quarterback | Tennessee Titans | 1 year / $1.105 million | |
| November 6 | Bruce Ellington | Wide receiver | Houston Texans | 1 year / $790,000 | |

=== Departures ===
| Date | Player | Position | Note | New Team | Source |
|---|---|---|---|---|---|
| March 14 | Eric Ebron | Tight end | Released | Indianapolis Colts | |
| March 14 | Don Carey | Safety | UFA | Jacksonville Jaguars | |
| March 14 | D. J. Hayden | Cornerback | UFA | Jacksonville Jaguars | |
| March 15 | Darren Fells | Tight end | UFA | Cleveland Browns | |
| March 15 | Haloti Ngata | Defensive tackle | UFA | Philadelphia Eagles | |
| March 15 | Tahir Whitehead | Linebacker | UFA | Oakland Raiders | |
| March 19 | Brandon Copeland | Linebacker | UFA | New York Jets | |
| April 3 | Paul Worrilow | Linebacker | UFA | Philadelphia Eagles | |
| April 3 | Travis Swanson | Center | UFA | New York Jets | |
| April 6 | Armonty Bryant | Defensive end | UFA | Oakland Raiders | |
| April 10 | Emmett Cleary | Offensive tackle | Retired | —N/a | |
| November 6 | Ameer Abdullah | Running back | Released | Minnesota Vikings | |

=== Trades ===
- On May 3, the Lions traded defensive tackle Akeem Spence to the Miami Dolphins in exchange for a conditional seventh-round draft pick in the 2019 NFL draft.
- On August 23, the Lions acquired linebacker Eli Harold from the San Francisco 49ers in exchange for a conditional seventh-round pick in the 2020 NFL draft.
- On October 24, the Lions acquired defensive tackle Damon Harrison from the New York Giants in exchange for a conditional fifth-round draft pick in the 2019 NFL Draft.
- On October 30, the Lions traded wide receiver Golden Tate to the Philadelphia Eagles in exchange for a third-round pick in the 2019 NFL Draft.

=== Draft ===
2018 Detroit Lions Draft
| Round | Selection | Player | Position | College | Source |
|---|---|---|---|---|---|
| 1 | 20 | Frank Ragnow | C | Arkansas | |
| 2 | 43 | Kerryon Johnson | RB | Auburn | |
| 3 | 82 | Tracy Walker | S | Louisiana | |
| 4 | 114 | Da'Shawn Hand | DE | Alabama | |
| 5 | 153 | Tyrell Crosby | OT | Oregon | |
| 7 | 237 | Nick Bawden | FB | San Diego State | |

Draft trades

- The Lions traded their sixth-round selection (No. 194 overall) to the Los Angeles Rams in exchange for offensive tackle Greg Robinson.
- The Lions made two separate trades with the New England Patriots — trading their original second-round selection (No. 51 overall) and their fourth-round selection (No. 117 overall) to the Patriots in exchange for the Patriots' second-round selection (No. 43 overall); and acquiring a fourth-round selection (No. 114 overall) in exchange for a third-round selection in the 2019 draft.

== Staff ==
2018 Detroit Lions staff
| Front office: Owner/chairwoman – Martha Firestone Ford; Vice chairman – William Clay Ford Jr.; President – Rod Wood; Special advisor to the president – Ernie Accorsi; COO – Allison Maki; Executive vice president/general manager – Bob Quinn; Vice president of football administration – Matt Harriss; Vice president of player personnel – Kyle O'Brien; Director of player personnel – Lance Newmark; Director of pro scouting – Brendan Prophett; Assistant director of college scouting – Dave Sears; Assistant director of pro scouting – Rob Lohman; Senior Personnel Executive – Jimmy Raye III; Head coaches: Head coach – Matt Patricia; Offensive coaches: Offensive coordinator – Jim Bob Cooter; Quarterbacks – George Godsey; Running backs – David Walker; Wide receivers – Robert Prince; Tight ends – Chris White; Offensive line – Jeff Davidson; Assistant offensive line – Hank Fraley; Offensive assistant/quality control – Brian Picucci; Offensive assistant – Derius Swinton II | Defensive coaches: Defensive coordinator – Paul Pasqualoni; Defensive line – Bo Davis; Linebackers – Al Golden; Defensive backs – Brian Stewart; Defensive quality control – Steven Williams; Defensive assistant – Steve Gregory; Special teams coaches: Special teams coordinator – Joe Marciano; Special teams assistant – Devin Fitzsimmons; Strength and conditioning: Head strength and conditioning – Harold Nash; Assistant strength and conditioning – Josh Schuler |

== Final roster ==
2018 Detroit Lions roster
| Quarterbacks (QB): 8 Matt Cassel; 9 Matthew Stafford; Running backs (RB): 43 Nick Bellore FB; 29 LeGarrette Blount; 25 Theo Riddick; 34 Zach Zenner; Wide receivers (WR): 19 Kenny Golladay; 17 Andy Jones; 13 T. J. Jones; 18 Chris Lacy; 10 Brandon Powell; Tight ends (TE): 86 Jerome Cunningham; 87 Levine Toilolo; 82 Luke Willson | Offensive linemen (OL): 65 Tyrell Crosby T; 66 Joe Dahl G; 68 Taylor Decker T; 78 Andrew Donnal T; 60 Graham Glasgow C; 75 Leo Koloamatangi C; 77 Frank Ragnow G; 71 Rick Wagner T; 79 Kenny Wiggins G; Defensive linemen (DL): 99 John Atkins DT; 98 Damon Harrison DT; 61 Kerry Hyder DE; 97 Ricky Jean Francois DT/DE; 70 Mitchell Loewen DE; 95 Romeo Okwara DE | Linebackers (LB): 53 Trevor Bates MLB; 40 Jarrad Davis MLB; 50 Nicholas Grigsby OLB; 57 Eli Harold OLB; 52 Christian Jones OLB; 42 Devon Kennard OLB; 55 Eric Lee OLB; 51 Kelvin Sheppard OLB; Defensive backs (DB): 39 Jamal Agnew CB; 36 Andre Chachere CB; 21 Marcus Cooper CB; 28 Quandre Diggs SS; 38 Mike Ford CB; 35 Miles Killebrew SS; 24 Nevin Lawson CB; 27 Glover Quin FS; 23 Darius Slay CB; 31 Teez Tabor CB; 30 Dee Virgin CB; 47 Tracy Walker FS; 32 Tavon Wilson SS; Special teams (ST): 6 Sam Martin P; 48 Don Muhlbach LS; 5 Matt Prater K | Practice squad: 16 Deontez Alexander WR; 3 Brian Brown WR; 58 Garret Dooley OLB (IR); 62 Joshua Frazier DT; 41 David Jones FS; 72 Jarron Jones T; 83 Brandon Reilly WR; 14 Jake Rudock QB; 49 Justin Stockton RB; 69 Jonathan Wynn DE; Reserve: 94 Ezekiel Ansah DE (IR); 46 Nick Bawden FB (IR); 12 Bruce Ellington WR (IR); 93 Da'Shawn Hand DE (IR); 33 Kerryon Johnson RB (IR); 11 Marvin Jones WR (IR); 76 T. J. Lang G (IR); 54 Steve Longa OLB (IR); 44 Jalen Reeves-Maybin OLB (IR); 80 Michael Roberts TE (IR); 91 A'Shawn Robinson DT (IR); 26 DeShawn Shead CB (IR); 45 Charles Washington FS (IR); Rookies in italics 53 active, 14 reserve, 9 practice squad |

== Schedule ==
=== Preseason ===
| Week | Date | Opponent | Result | Record | Venue | Recap |
|---|---|---|---|---|---|---|
| 1 | August 10 | at Oakland Raiders | **L** 10–16 | 0–1 | Oakland–Alameda County Coliseum | Recap |
| 2 | August 17 | New York Giants | **L** 17–30 | 0–2 | Ford Field | Recap |
| 3 | August 24 | at Tampa Bay Buccaneers | **W** 33–30 | 1–2 | Raymond James Stadium | Recap |
| 4 | August 30 | Cleveland Browns | **L** 17–35 | 1–3 | Ford Field | Recap |

=== Regular season ===
| Week | Date | Opponent | Result | Record | Venue | Recap |
|---|---|---|---|---|---|---|
| 1 | September 10 | New York Jets | **L** 17–48 | 0–1 | Ford Field | Recap |
| 2 | September 16 | at San Francisco 49ers | **L** 27–30 | 0–2 | Levi's Stadium | Recap |
| 3 | September 23 | New England Patriots | **W** 26–10 | 1–2 | Ford Field | Recap |
| 4 | September 30 | at Dallas Cowboys | **L** 24–26 | 1–3 | AT&T Stadium | Recap |
| 5 | October 7 | **Green Bay Packers** | **W** 31–23 | 2–3 | Ford Field | Recap |
| 6 | Bye | | | | | |
| 7 | October 21 | at Miami Dolphins | **W** 32–21 | 3–3 | Hard Rock Stadium | Recap |
| 8 | October 28 | Seattle Seahawks | **L** 14–28 | 3–4 | Ford Field | Recap |
| 9 | November 4 | at **Minnesota Vikings** | **L** 9–24 | 3–5 | U.S. Bank Stadium | Recap |
| 10 | November 11 | at **Chicago Bears** | **L** 22–34 | 3–6 | Soldier Field | Recap |
| 11 | November 18 | Carolina Panthers | **W** 20–19 | 4–6 | Ford Field | Recap |
| 12 | November 22 | **Chicago Bears** | **L** 16–23 | 4–7 | Ford Field | Recap |
| 13 | December 2 | Los Angeles Rams | **L** 16–30 | 4–8 | Ford Field | Recap |
| 14 | December 9 | at Arizona Cardinals | **W** 17–3 | 5–8 | State Farm Stadium | Recap |
| 15 | December 16 | at Buffalo Bills | **L** 13–14 | 5–9 | New Era Field | Recap |
| 16 | December 23 | **Minnesota Vikings** | **L** 9–27 | 5–10 | Ford Field | Recap |
| 17 | December 30 | at **Green Bay Packers** | **W** 31–0 | 6–10 | Lambeau Field | Recap |

Note: Intra-division opponents are in bold text.

=== Game summaries ===
==== Week 1: vs. New York Jets ====
Week One: New York Jets at Detroit Lions – Game summary

| Quarter | 1 | 2 | 3 | 4 | Total |
|---|---|---|---|---|---|
| **Jets** | 7 | 10 | 31 | 0 | **48** |
| Lions | 7 | 3 | 7 | 0 | **17** |

at Ford Field, Detroit, Michigan

- Date: September 10
- Game time: 7:10 p.m. EDT
- Game weather: Played indoors (dome stadium)
- Game attendance: 61,356
- Referee: Bill Vinovich
- TV announcers (ESPN): Beth Mowins, Brian Griese and Laura Rutledge
- Recap, Gamebook

Game information

**First quarter**

- DET – Quandre Diggs 37-yard interception return (Matt Prater kick), 14:53. Lions 7–0.
- NYJ – Isaiah Crowell 6-yard run (Jason Myers kick), 4:26. Tied 7–7. **Drive: 5 plays, 32 yards, 2:34.**

**Second quarter**

- NYJ – Jason Myers 35-yard field goal, 15:00. Jets 10–7. **Drive: 8 plays, 32 yards, 4:08.**
- NYJ – Robby Anderson 41-yard pass from Sam Darnold (Jason Myers kick), 2:00. Jets 17–7. **Drive: 3 plays, 49 yards, 1:22.**
- DET – Matt Prater 21-yard field goal, 0:15. Jets 17–10. **Drive: 10 plays, 72 yards, 1:40.**

**Third quarter**

- DET – Golden Tate 24-yard pass from Matthew Stafford (Matt Prater kick), 13:17. Tied 17–17. **Drive: 4 plays, 75 yards, 1:50.**
- NYJ – Quincy Enunwa 21-yard pass from Sam Darnold (Jason Myers kick), 9:44. Jets 24–17. **Drive: 6 plays, 75 yards, 3:34.**
- NYJ – Darron Lee 36-yard interception return (Jason Myers kick), 8:16. Jets 31–17.
- NYJ – Andre Roberts 78-yard punt return (Jason Myers kick), 7:20. Jets 38–17.
- NYJ – Jason Myers 32-yard field goal, 5:19. Jets 41–17. **Drive: 4 plays, 4 yards, 1:32.**
- NYJ – Isaiah Crowell 62-yard run (Jason Myers kick), 1:04. Jets 48–17. **Drive: 2 plays, 66 yards, 0:52.**

**Fourth quarter**

- No scoring plays.

**Top passers**

- NYJ – Sam Darnold – 16/21, 198 yards, 2 TD, INT
- DET – Matthew Stafford – 27/46, 286 yards, TD, 4 INT

**Top rushers**

- NYJ – Isaiah Crowell – 10 carries, 102 yards, 2 TD
- DET – Theo Riddick – 4 carries, 20 yards

**Top receivers**

- NYJ – Quincy Enunwa – 6 receptions, 63 yards, TD
- DET – Kenny Golladay – 7 receptions, 114 yards

The Lions opened the regular season at home, hosting the New York Jets on Monday Night Football. The Lions took an early lead in the first quarter when Quandre Diggs intercepted a Sam Darnold pass and ran it in from 37-yards, but the Jets quickly tied it up following a seven-yard touchdown run from Isaiah Crowell. In the second quarter, the Jets scored 10 more points via a 35-yard field goal by Jason Myers and a 41-yard touchdown pass from Darnold to Robby Anderson. The Lions scored the final points of the first half via a 21-yard field goal from Matt Prater, to make the score 17–10 in favor of the Jets at half-time. After the intermission, the Lions again tied the game following a 24-yard touchdown pass from Matthew Stafford to Golden Tate, for their only points of the second half. The Jets then scored 31 unanswered points for a runaway victory. First three touchdowns: a 21-yard reception by Quincy Enunwa, a 36-yard interception return by Darron Lee and a 78-yard punt return by Andre Roberts. After a 32-yard field goal by Jason Myers, the Jets capped off their lopsided win with a 62-yard run by Crowell, making the final score 48–17 in favor of New York.

==== Week 2: at San Francisco 49ers ====
Week Two: Detroit Lions at San Francisco 49ers – Game summary

| Quarter | 1 | 2 | 3 | 4 | Total |
|---|---|---|---|---|---|
| Lions | 7 | 3 | 3 | 14 | **27** |
| **49ers** | 3 | 10 | 14 | 3 | **30** |

at Levi's Stadium, Santa Clara, California

- Date: September 16
- Game time: 4:05 p.m. EDT/1:05 p.m. PDT
- Game weather: 73 °F (23 °C), clear
- Game attendance: 70,164
- Referee: Shawn Hochuli
- TV announcers (Fox): Thom Brennaman, Chris Spielman and Shannon Spake
- Recap, Gamebook

Game information

**First quarter**

- SF – Robbie Gould 45-yard field goal, 6:18. **Drive: 8 plays, 63 yards, 4:34.** 49ers 3–0.
- DET – Kenny Golladay 30-yard pass from Matthew Stafford (Matt Prater kick), 2:45. **Drive: 7 plays, 69 yards, 3:33.** Lions 7–3.

**Second quarter**

- SF – Kendrick Bourne 4-yard pass from Jimmy Garoppolo (Robbie Gould kick), 12:07. **Drive: 13 plays, 88 yards, 5:38.** 49ers 10–7.
- SF – Robbie Gould 42-yard field goal, 4:55. **Drive: 4 plays, −8 yards, 1:35.** 49ers 13–7.
- DET – Matt Prater 27-yard field goal, 0:03. **Drive: 9 plays, 57 yards, 0:46.** 49ers 13–10.

**Third quarter**

- SF – Garrett Celek 11-yard pass from Jimmy Garoppolo (Robbie Gould kick), 13:17. **Drive: 4 plays, 26 yards, 1:43.** 49ers 20–10.
- DET – Matt Prater 43-yard field goal, 8:46. **Drive: 8 plays, 27 yards, 4:31.** 49ers 20–13.
- SF – Matt Breida 66-yard run (Robbie Gould kick), 0:52. **Drive: 3 plays, 97 yards, 1:13.** 49ers 27–13.

**Fourth quarter**

- SF – Robbie Gould 36-yard field goal, 11:21. **Drive: 7 plays, 35 yards, 3:22.** 49ers 30–13.
- DET – Marvin Jones 5-yard pass from Matthew Stafford (Matt Prater kick), 8:36. **Drive: 5 plays, 80 yards, 2:45.** 49ers 30–20.
- DET – Michael Roberts 15-yard pass from Matthew Stafford (Matt Prater kick), 3:27. **Drive: 12 plays, 79 yards, 2:41.** 49ers 30–27.

**Top passers**

- DET – Matthew Stafford – 34/53, 347 yards, 3 TD
- SF – Jimmy Garoppolo – 18/26, 206 yards, 2 TD

**Top rushers**

- DET – Kerryon Johnson – 8 carries, 43 yards
- SF – Matt Breida – 11 carries, 138 yards, TD

**Top receivers**

- DET – Golden Tate – 7 receptions, 109 yards
- SF – Pierre Garçon – 4 receptions, 57 yards

In week 2, the Lions visited the San Francisco 49ers. The 49ers took an early lead in the first quarter via a 45-yard field goal by Robbie Gould. The Lions responded with a 30-yard touchdown pass from Matthew Stafford to Kenny Golladay, to take their first and only lead of the game. The 49ers scored 10 points in the second quarter via a four-yard touchdown pass from Jimmy Garoppolo to Kendrick Bourne and a 42-yard field goal from Gould. The Lions scored the final points of the first half via a 27-yard field goal from Matt Prater, to make the score 13–10 in favor of the 49ers at half-time. The 49ers scored 14 points in the third quarter via an 11-yard touchdown pass from Garoppolo to Garrett Celek and a 66-yard touchdown run from Matt Breida. The Lions then added a 43-yard field goal from Prater. The 49ers extended their lead in the fourth quarter via a 36-yard field goal from Gould. The Lions scored 14 points in the final quarter via a five-yard touchdown reception by Marvin Jones and a 15-yard touchdown reception by Michael Roberts, making the final score 30–27 in favor of San Francisco.

==== Week 3: vs. New England Patriots ====
Week Three: New England Patriots at Detroit Lions – Game summary

| Quarter | 1 | 2 | 3 | 4 | Total |
|---|---|---|---|---|---|
| Patriots | 0 | 3 | 7 | 0 | **10** |
| **Lions** | 3 | 10 | 7 | 6 | **26** |

at Ford Field, Detroit, Michigan

- Date: September 23
- Game time: 8:20 p.m. EDT
- Game weather: Played indoors (dome stadium)
- Game attendance: 61,769
- Referee: Clete Blakeman
- TV announcers (NBC): Al Michaels, Cris Collinsworth, Michele Tafoya and Terry McAulay
- Recap, Gamebook

Game information

**First quarter**

- DET – Matt Prater 38-yard field goal, 5:55. Lions 3–0. **Drive: 12 plays, 65 yards, 7:37.**

**Second quarter**

- DET – Kenny Golladay 4-yard pass from Matthew Stafford (Matt Prater kick), 14:12. Lions 10–0. **Drive: 9 plays, 60 yards, 5:41.**
- DET – Matt Prater 25-yard field goal, 4:58. Lions 13–0. **Drive: 14 plays, 71 yards, 7:28.**
- NE – Stephen Gostkowski 36-yard field goal, 0:40. Lions 13–3. **Drive: 11 plays, 57 yards, 4:18.**

**Third quarter**

- NE – James White 10-yard pass from Tom Brady (Stephen Gostkowski kick), 10:03. Lions 13–10. **Drive: 7 plays, 52 yards, 3:31.**
- DET – Marvin Jones 33-yard pass from Matthew Stafford (Matt Prater kick), 3:45. Lions 20–10. **Drive: 10 plays, 75 yards, 6:18.**

**Fourth quarter**

- DET – Matt Prater 32-yard field goal, 12:44. Lions 23–10. **Drive: 8 plays, 61 yards, 4:14.**
- DET – Matt Prater 30-yard field goal, 1:56. Lions 26–10. **Drive: 4 plays, 1 yard, 1:20.**

**Top passers**

- NE – Tom Brady – 14/26, 133 yards, TD, INT
- DET – Matthew Stafford – 27/36, 262 yards, 2 TD, INT

**Top rushers**

- NE – Sony Michel – 14 carries, 50 yards
- DET – Kerryon Johnson – 16 carries, 101 yards

**Top receivers**

- NE – Rob Gronkowski – 4 receptions, 51 yards
- DET – Marvin Jones – 4 receptions, 69 yards, TD

In week 3, the Lions hosted the New England Patriots on Sunday Night Football. The Lions opened the scoring in the first quarter via a 38-yard field goal by Matt Prater to take a lead they never gave up. The Lions scored 10 points in the second quarter via a four-yard touchdown pass from Matthew Stafford to Kenny Golladay and a 25-yard field goal from Prater. The Patriots finally got on the board late in the quarter via a 36-yard field goal by Stephen Gostkowski, to make the score 13–3 in favor of the Lions at half-time. The teams exchanged touchdowns in the third quarter, first a 10-yard touchdown pass from Tom Brady to James White for the Patriots, then a 33-yard touchdown pass from Stafford to Marvin Jones for the Lions. The Lions extended their lead in the fourth quarter via two field goals from Prater, from 32-yards and 30-yards, respectively, making the final score 26–10 in favor of Detroit, for their first win of the season. This was the Lions' first victory over the Patriots since the 2000 season. Kerryon Johnson's 101 rushing yards marked the first time a Lions player rushed for over 100 yards in a game since Reggie Bush on Thanksgiving Day in 2013, ending the fourth-longest streak (70 games) without a 100-yard rusher in NFL history.

==== Week 4: at Dallas Cowboys ====
Week Four: Detroit Lions at Dallas Cowboys – Game summary

| Quarter | 1 | 2 | 3 | 4 | Total |
|---|---|---|---|---|---|
| Lions | 7 | 3 | 0 | 14 | **24** |
| **Cowboys** | 3 | 10 | 7 | 6 | **26** |

at AT&T Stadium, Arlington, Texas

- Date: September 30
- Game time: 1:00 p.m. EDT/12:00 p.m. CDT
- Game weather: Played indoors (retractable roof closed)
- Game attendance: 90,155
- Referee: Walt Coleman
- TV announcers (Fox): Kevin Burkhardt, Charles Davis and Pam Oliver
- Recap, Gamebook

Game information

**First quarter**

- DAL – Brett Maher 32-yard field goal, 4:34. **Drive: 7 plays, 76 yards, 2:09.** Cowboys 3–0.
- DET – Golden Tate 45-yard pass from Matthew Stafford (Matt Prater kick), 0:19. **Drive: 9 plays, 77 yards, 4:11.** Lions 7–3.

**Second quarter**

- DAL – Brett Maher 43-yard field goal, 11:06. **Drive: 12 plays, 50 yards, 4:18.** Lions 7–6.
- DET – Matt Prater 33-yard field goal, 2:54. **Drive: 13 plays, 60 yards, 8:11.** Lions 10–6.
- DAL – Ezekiel Elliott 38-yard pass from Dak Prescott (Brett Maher kick), 1:18. **Drive: 4 plays, 75 yards, 1:11.** Cowboys 13–10.

**Third quarter**

- DAL – Geoff Swaim 1-yard pass from Dak Prescott (Brett Maher kick), 3:01. **Drive: 8 plays, 64 yards, 4:03.** Cowboys 20–10.

**Fourth quarter**

- DET – Kerryon Johnson 8-yard run (Matt Prater kick), 14:20. **Drive: 7 plays, 75 yards, 3:39.** Cowboys 20–17.
- DAL – Brett Maher 22-yard field goal, 5:52. **Drive: 16 plays, 85 yards, 8:31.** Cowboys 23–17.
- DET – Golden Tate 38-yard pass from Matthew Stafford (Matt Prater kick), 2:17. **Drive: 6 plays, 75 yards, 3:32.** Lions 24–23.
- DAL – Brett Maher 38-yard field goal, 0:03. **Drive: 9 plays, 55 yards, 2:17.** Cowboys 26–24.

**Top passers**

- DET – Matthew Stafford – 24/30, 307 yards, 2 TD
- DAL – Dak Prescott – 17/27, 255 yards, 2 TD

**Top rushers**

- DET – Kerryon Johnson – 9 carries, 55 yards, TD
- DAL – Ezekiel Elliott – 25 carries, 152 yards

**Top receivers**

- DET – Golden Tate – 8 receptions, 132 yards, 2 TD
- DAL – Ezekiel Elliott – 4 receptions, 88 yards, TD

In week 4, the Lions donned all-silver uniforms and visited the Dallas Cowboys. Dallas opened the scoring in the first quarter via a 32-yard field goal from Brett Maher. Detroit responded with a 45-yard touchdown pass from Matthew Stafford to Golden Tate, to take their first lead of the game. In the second quarter, both teams scored a field goal, first a 43-yard field goal by Maher for the Cowboys, then a 33-yard field goal by Matt Prater for the Lions. The Cowboys regained the lead with a 38-yard touchdown pass from Dak Prescott to Ezekiel Elliott, to make the score 13–10 in favor of the Dallas at half-time. The only points of the third quarter was from Dallas via a one-yard touchdown pass from Prescott to Geoff Swaim. The Lions scored a pair of touchdowns in the fourth quarter while the Cowboys had a pair of field goals. First an eight-yard touchdown run from Kerryon Johnson for Detroit, then a 22-yard field goal from Maher for Dallas. The Lions took a one-point lead when Tate caught a 38-yard touchdown pass from Stafford, but the Cowboys won in the final seconds of the game with a 38-yard field goal by Maher.

==== Week 5: vs. Green Bay Packers ====
Week Five: Green Bay Packers at Detroit Lions – Game summary

| Quarter | 1 | 2 | 3 | 4 | Total |
|---|---|---|---|---|---|
| Packers | 0 | 0 | 14 | 9 | **23** |
| **Lions** | 14 | 10 | 0 | 7 | **31** |

at Ford Field, Detroit, Michigan

- Date: October 7
- Game time: 1:00 p.m. EDT
- Game weather: Played indoors (dome stadium)
- Game attendance: 63,405
- Referee: John Hussey
- TV announcers (Fox): Thom Brennaman, Chris Spielman and Shannon Spake
- Recap, Gamebook

Game information

**First quarter**

- DET – LeGarrette Blount 1-yard run (Matt Prater kick), 10:30. **Drive: 1 play, 1 yard, 0:04.** Lions 7–0.
- DET – LeGarrette Blount 1-yard run (Matt Prater kick), 1:06. **Drive: 4 plays, 69 yards, 2:16.** Lions 14–0.

**Second quarter**

- DET – Matt Prater 39-yard field goal, 14:52. **Drive: 4 plays, 1 yard, 0:21.** Lions 17–0.
- DET – Marvin Jones 8-yard pass from Matthew Stafford (Matt Prater kick), 0:20. **Drive: 4 plays, 29 yards, 0:38.** Lions 24–0.

**Third quarter**

- GB – Marquez Valdes-Scantling 3-yard pass from Aaron Rodgers, Aaron Rodgers pass to Jamaal Williams is complete for two-point conversion, 9:40. **Drive: 11 plays, 75 yards, 5:20.** Lions 24–8.
- GB – Lance Kendricks 1-yard pass from Aaron Rodgers, 1:14. **Drive: 11 plays, 55 yards, 4:41.** Lions 24–14.

**Fourth quarter**

- DET – Kenny Golladay 5-yard pass from Matthew Stafford (Matt Prater kick), 12:55. **Drive: 8 plays, 75 yards, 3:19.** Lions 31–14.
- GB – Davante Adams 12-yard pass from Aaron Rodgers, 9:01. **Drive: 8 plays, 75 yards, 3:54.** Lions 31–20.
- GB – Mason Crosby 41-yard field goal, 0:07. **Drive: 6 plays, 74 yards, 1:02.** Lions 31–23.

**Top passers**

- GB – Aaron Rodgers – 32/52, 442 yards, 3 TD
- DET – Matthew Stafford – 14/26, 183 yards, 2 TD

**Top rushers**

- GB – Aaron Jones – 7 carries, 40 yards
- DET – Kerryon Johnson – 12 carries, 70 yards

**Top receivers**

- GB – Davante Adams – 9 receptions, 140 yards, TD
- DET – Kenny Golladay – 4 receptions, 98 yards, TD

In week 5, the Lions hosted their divisional rival the Green Bay Packers. The Lions scored 24 unanswered points in the first half. First a pair of one-yard touchdown runs in the first quarter by LeGarrette Blount. The Lions added 10 points in the second quarter via a 39-yard field goal by Matt Prater and an eight-yard touchdown pass from Matthew Stafford to Marvin Jones, to make the score 24–0 in favor of the Lions at half-time. The Packers finally got on the board in the third quarter scoring 14 points via a three-yard touchdown pass from Aaron Rodgers to Marquez Valdes-Scantling, followed by a two-point conversion pass from Rodgers to Jamaal Williams and a one-yard touchdown pass from Rodgers to Lance Kendricks. In the fourth quarter, Detroit scored their only points of the second half via a five-yard touchdown pass from Stafford to Kenny Golladay. Green Bay added nine more points via a 12-yard touchdown pass from Rodgers to Davante Adams and a 41-yard field goal from Mason Crosby, making the final score 31–23 in favor of Detroit. Dating back to last season, it was the first time the Lions defeated the Packers three games in a row since they did so during the 1990 and 1991 seasons. They went into their bye week with a 2–3 record.

==== Week 7: at Miami Dolphins ====
Week Seven: Detroit Lions at Miami Dolphins – Game summary

| Quarter | 1 | 2 | 3 | 4 | Total |
|---|---|---|---|---|---|
| **Lions** | 7 | 10 | 9 | 6 | **32** |
| Dolphins | 0 | 7 | 7 | 7 | **21** |

at Hard Rock Stadium, Miami Gardens, Florida

- Date: October 21
- Game time: 1:00 p.m. EDT
- Game weather: 89 °F (32 °C), partly cloudy
- Game attendance: 65,265
- Referee: Jerome Boger
- TV announcers (Fox): Dick Stockton, Mark Schlereth and Jennifer Hale
- Recap, Gamebook

Game information

**First quarter**

- DET – Michael Roberts 15-yard pass from Matthew Stafford (Matt Prater kick), 9:12. **Drive: 6 plays, 64 yards, 3:36.** Lions 7–0.

**Second quarter**

- DET – Matt Prater 29-yard field goal, 12:39. **Drive: 6 plays, 85 yards, 2:38.** Lions 10–0.
- MIA – Kenny Stills 5-yard pass from Brock Osweiler (Jason Sanders kick), 7:33. **Drive: 11 plays, 77 yards, 5:01.** Lions 10–7.
- DET – LeGarrette Blount 2-yard run (Matt Prater kick), 1:02. **Drive: 12 plays, 75 yards, 6:31.** Lions 17–7.

**Third quarter**

- DET – Matt Prater 28-yard field goal, 8:36. **Drive: 12 plays, 65 yards, 6:28.** Lions 20–7.
- MIA – Kenyan Drake 54-yard run (Jason Sanders kick), 7:06. **Drive: 5 plays, 75 yards, 1:26.** Lions 20–14.
- DET – Michael Roberts 4-yard pass from Matthew Stafford, 3:16. **Drive: 6 plays, 75 yards, 3:50.** Lions 26–14.

**Fourth quarter**

- DET – Matt Prater 35-yard field goal, 10:09. **Drive: 7 plays, 63 yards, 3:59.** Lions 29–14.
- MIA – Danny Amendola 24-yard pass from Brock Osweiler (Jason Sanders kick), 6:00. **Drive: 10 plays, 75 yards, 4:04.** Lions 29–21.
- DET – Matt Prater 50-yard field goal, 2:00. **Drive: 8 plays, 44 yards, 4:05.** Lions 32–21.

**Top passers**

- DET – Matthew Stafford – 18/22, 217 yards, 2 TD
- MIA – Brock Osweiler – 22/31, 329 yards, 2 TD

**Top rushers**

- DET – Kerryon Johnson – 19 carries, 158 yards
- MIA – Kenyan Drake – 6 carries, 72 yards, TD

**Top receivers**

- DET – Michael Roberts – 3 receptions, 48 yards, 2 TD
- MIA – Danny Amendola – 6 receptions, 84 yards, TD

In week 7, the Lions visited the Miami Dolphins. The Lions took an early lead in the first quarter, that they never gave back, following a 15-yard touchdown pass from Matthew Stafford to Michael Roberts. The Lions added 10 points in the second quarter, via a 29-yard field goal by Matt Prater and a two-yard touchdown run from LeGarrette Blount. Miami got on the board via a five-yard touchdown pass from Brock Osweiler to Kenny Stills, to make the score 17–7 in favor of the Lions at half-time. The Lions extended their lead in third quarter via a 28-yard field goal from Prater and a four-yard touchdown pass from Stafford to Roberts. The Dolphins responded with a 54-yard touchdown run by Kenyan Drake. The Lions added six points in the fourth quarter, via two field goals by Prater from 35-yards and 50-yards, respectively. The Dolphins responded with a 24-yard touchdown pass from Osweiler to Danny Amendola, making the final score 32–21 in favor of Detroit. This was the Lions' first road win of the season. The Lions rushed for 248 yards in the game, their highest rushing total since November 23, 1997.

==== Week 8: vs. Seattle Seahawks ====
Week Eight: Seattle Seahawks at Detroit Lions – Game summary

| Quarter | 1 | 2 | 3 | 4 | Total |
|---|---|---|---|---|---|
| **Seahawks** | 0 | 21 | 0 | 7 | **28** |
| Lions | 7 | 0 | 0 | 7 | **14** |

at Ford Field, Detroit, Michigan

- Date: October 28
- Game time: 1:00 p.m. EDT
- Game weather: Played indoors (dome stadium)
- Game attendance: 65,237
- Referee: Walt Anderson
- TV announcers (Fox): Kevin Kugler, Chris Spielman, Ronde Barber and Shannon Spake
- Recap, Gamebook

Game information

**First quarter**

- DET – Marvin Jones 39-yard pass from Matthew Stafford (Matt Prater kick), 2:15. **Drive 13 plays, 91 yards, 6:53.** Lions 7–0.

**Second quarter**

- SEA – Tyler Lockett 24-yard pass from Russell Wilson (Sebastian Janikowski kick), 14:15. **Drive:7 plays, 75 yards, 3:00.** Tied 7–7.
- SEA – David Moore 15-yard pass from Russell Wilson (Sebastian Janikowski kick), 12:42. **Drive: 3 plays, 34 yards, 1:22.** Seahawks 14–7.
- SEA – Ed Dickson 12 yard pass from Russell Wilson (Sebastian Janikowski kick), 2:28. **Drive: 12 plays, 80 yards, 7:16.** Seahawks 21–7.

**Third quarter**

- No scoring

**Fourth quarter**

- SEA – Chris Carson 7-yard run (Sebastian Janikowski kick), 14:23. **Drive: 7 plays, 75 yards, 3:53.** Seahawks 28–7.
- DET – Marvin Jones 19-yard pass from Matthew Stafford (Matt Prater kick), 10:40. **Drive: 10 plays, 85 yards, 3:43.** Seahawks 28–14.

**Top passers**

- SEA – Russell Wilson – 14/17, 247 yards, 3 TD
- DET – Matthew Stafford – 27/40, 310 yards, 2 TD, INT

**Top rushers**

- SEA – Chris Carson – 25 carries, 105 yards, TD
- DET – Kerryon Johnson – 8 carries, 22 yards

**Top receivers**

- SEA – David Moore – 4 receptions, 97 yards, TD
- DET – Marvin Jones – 7 receptions, 117 yards, 2 TD

In week 8, the Lions hosted the Seattle Seahawks. Detroit took an early lead in the first quarter via a 39-yard touchdown pass from Matthew Stafford to Marvin Jones, but Seattle tied it up in the second quarter via a 24-yard touchdown pass from Russell Wilson to Tyler Lockett and added 14 more points via a 15-yard touchdown pass from Wilson to David Moore and a 12-yard touchdown pass from Wilson to Ed Dickson, to make the score 21–7 in favor of the Seahawks at half-time. After a scoreless third quarter, Seattle extended their lead in the fourth quarter via a seven-yard touchdown run by Chris Carson. The Lions scored the game's final points with another touchdown pass from Stafford to Jones, this one for 19-yards, making the final score 28–14 in favor of Seattle.

==== Week 9: at Minnesota Vikings ====
Week Nine: Detroit Lions at Minnesota Vikings – Game summary

| Quarter | 1 | 2 | 3 | 4 | Total |
|---|---|---|---|---|---|
| Lions | 0 | 6 | 0 | 3 | **9** |
| **Vikings** | 7 | 10 | 0 | 7 | **24** |

at U.S. Bank Stadium, Minneapolis, Minnesota

- Date: November 4
- Game time: 1:00 p.m. EST/12:00 p.m. CST
- Game weather: Played indoors (dome stadium)
- Game attendance: 66,825
- Referee: Pete Morelli
- TV announcers (Fox): Thom Brennaman, Chris Spielman and Shannon Spake
- Recap, Gamebook

Game information

**First quarter**

- MIN – Latavius Murray 1-yard run (Dan Bailey kick), 9:59. **Drive: 9 plays, 65 yards, 5:07.** Vikings 7–0.

**Second quarter**

- DET – Matt Prater 35-yard field goal, 13:20. **Drive: 14 plays, 48 yards, 8:16.** Vikings 7–3.
- DET – Matt Prater 35-yard field goal, 4:48. **Drive: 0 plays, 28 yards, 5:44.** Vikings 7–6.
- MIN – Adam Thielen 2-yard pass from Kirk Cousins (Dan Bailey kick), 3:20. **Drive: 3 plays, 75 yards, 1:25.** Vikings 14–6.
- MIN – Dan Bailey 39-yard field goal, 0:08. **Drive: 5 plays, 31 yards, 0:35.** Vikings 17–6.

**Third quarter**

- No scoring

**Fourth quarter**

- MIN – Danielle Hunter 32-yard fumble recovery (Dan Bailey kick), 6:57. **Drive: 6 plays, 4 yards, 3:16.** Vikings 24–6.
- DET – Matt Prater 37-yard field goal, 1:13. **Drive: 17 plays, 69 yards, 5:46.** Vikings 24–9.

**Top passers**

- DET – Matthew Stafford – 25/36, 199 yards
- MIN – Kirk Cousins – 18/22, 164 yards, TD, INT

**Top rushers**

- DET – Kerryon Johnson – 12 carries, 37 yards
- MIN – Dalvin Cook – 10 carries, 89 yards

**Top receivers**

- DET – Marvin Jones – 6 receptions, 66 yards
- MIN – Laquon Treadwell – 2 receptions, 37 yards

In week 9, the Lions visited their divisional rival the Minnesota Vikings. The Vikings took an early lead in the first quarter via a one-yard touchdown run from Latavius Murray. The Lions responded in the second quarter with a pair of 35-yard field goals by Matt Prater. The Vikings extended their lead via a two-yard touchdown pass from Kirk Cousins to Adam Thielen and a 39-yard field goal by Dan Bailey, to make the score 17–6 in favor of Minnesota at half-time. After a scoreless third quarter, each team scored once in the fourth quarter. First a 32-yard fumble recovery for a touchdown by Danielle Hunter for the Vikings, then a 37-yard field goal by Prater for the Lions, making the final score 24–9 in favor of Minnesota.

==== Week 10: at Chicago Bears ====
Week Ten: Detroit Lions at Chicago Bears – Game summary

| Quarter | 1 | 2 | 3 | 4 | Total |
|---|---|---|---|---|---|
| Lions | 0 | 7 | 3 | 12 | **22** |
| **Bears** | 13 | 13 | 8 | 0 | **34** |

at Soldier Field, Chicago, Illinois

- Date: November 11
- Game time: 1:00 p.m. EST/12:00 p.m. CST
- Game weather: 37 °F (3 °C), mostly cloudy
- Game attendance: 61,393
- Referee: Alex Kemp
- TV announcers (Fox): Chris Myers, Daryl Johnston and Laura Okmin
- Recap, Gamebook

Game information

**First quarter**

- CHI – Tarik Cohen 3-yard run, 11:22. **Drive: 8 plays, 75 yards, 3:38.** Bears 6–0.
- CHI – Allen Robinson 36-yard pass from Mitchell Trubisky (Cody Parkey kick), 0:39. **Drive: 8 plays, 91 yards, 4:36.** Bears 13–0.

**Second quarter**

- CHI – Anthony Miller 45-yard pass from Mitchell Trubisky, 11:24. **Drive: 4 plays, 71 yards, 1:56.** Bears 19–0.
- CHI – Mitchell Trubisky 4-yard run (Cody Parkey kick), 8:14. **Drive: 4 plays, 18 yards, 1:38.** Bears 26–0.
- DET – Kerryon Johnson 1-yard run (Matt Prater kick), 1:05. **Drive: 14 plays, 75 yards, 7:09.** Bears 26–7.

**Third quarter**

- DET – Matt Prater 52-yard field goal, 13:23. **Drive: 5 plays, 36 yards, 1:37.** Bears 26–10.
- CHI – Allen Robinson 26-yard pass from Mitchell Trubisky (Mitchell Trubisky pass to Trey Burton for two-point conversion), 2:50. **Drive: 2 plays, 50 yards, 0:54.** Bears 34–10.

**Fourth quarter**

- DET – Kenny Golladay 5-yd pass from Matthew Stafford, 8:30. **Drive: 5 plays, 50 yards, 2:00.** Bears 34–16.
- DET – Kerryon Johnson 13-yd pass from Matthew Stafford, 7:21. **Drive: 5 plays, 38 yards, 1:09.** Bears 34–22.

**Top passers**

- DET – Matthew Stafford – 25/42, 274 yards, 2 TD, 2 INT
- CHI – Mitchell Trubisky – 23/30, 355 yards, 3 TD

**Top rushers**

- DET – Kerryon Johnson – 14 carries, 51 yards, TD
- CHI – Jordan Howard – 11 carries, 21 yards

**Top receivers**

- DET – Kenny Golladay – 6 receptions, 78 yards, TD
- CHI – Allen Robinson – 6 receptions, 133 yards, 2 TD

In week 10, the Lions visited their divisional rival the Chicago Bears. The Bears scored 13 points in the first quarter via a three-yard touchdown run by Tarik Cohen and a 36-yard touchdown pass from Mitchell Trubisky to Allen Robinson. The Bears added another 13 points in the second quarter via a 45-yard touchdown pass from Trubisky to Anthony Miller and a four-yard touchdown run by Trubisky. The Lions finally got on the board just before the intermission via a one-yard touchdown run by Kerryon Johnson, to make the score 26–7 in favor of Chicago at half-time. The Lions opened the scoring in the second half with a 52-yard field goal by Matt Prater. The Bears extended their lead in the third quarter via a 26-yard touchdown pass from Trubisky to Robinson, followed by a two-point conversion pass from Trubisky to Trey Burton. In the fourth quarter, the Lions scored 12 points via a five-yard touchdown pass from Matthew Stafford to Kenny Golladay and a 13-yard touchdown pass from Stafford to Johnson, making the final score 34–22 in favor of Chicago.

==== Week 11: vs. Carolina Panthers ====
Week Eleven: Carolina Panthers at Detroit Lions – Game summary

| Quarter | 1 | 2 | 3 | 4 | Total |
|---|---|---|---|---|---|
| Panthers | 7 | 0 | 0 | 12 | **19** |
| **Lions** | 7 | 3 | 3 | 7 | **20** |

at Ford Field, Detroit, Michigan

- Date: November 18
- Game time: 1:00 p.m. EST
- Game weather: Played indoors (dome stadium)
- Game attendance: 61,999
- Referee: Clay Martin
- TV announcers (Fox): Kenny Albert, Ronde Barber and Jennifer Hale
- Recap, Gamebook

Game information

**First quarter**

- CAR – Greg Olsen 1-yard pass from Cam Newton (Graham Gano kick), 9:27. **Drive: 10 plays, 90 yards, 5:33.** Panthers 7–0.
- DET – Kerryon Johnson 8-yard run (Matt Prater kick), 2:36. **Drive: 12 plays, 72 yards, 6:51.** Tied 7–7.

**Second quarter**

- DET – Matt Prater 54-yard field goal, 0:37. **Drive: 10 plays, 48 yards, 3:36.** Lions 10–7.

**Third quarter**

- DET – Matt Prater 32-yard field goal, 3:47. **Drive: 11 plays, 62 yards, 5:24.** Lions 13–7.

**Fourth quarter**

- CAR – Curtis Samuel 12-yard pass from Cam Newton, 9:29. **Drive: 10 plays, 92 yards, 4:33.** Tied 13–13.
- DET – Kenny Golladay 19-yard pass from Matthew Stafford, 5:13. **Drive: 9 plays, 75 yards, 4:10.** Lions 20–13.
- CAR – D. J. Moore 8-yard pass from Cam Newton, 1:07. **Drive: 6 plays, 75 yards, 1:37.** Lions 20–19.

**Top passers**

- CAR – Cam Newton – 25/37, 357 yards, 3 TD, INT
- DET – Matthew Stafford – 23/37, 220 yards, TD

**Top rushers**

- CAR – Christian McCaffrey – 13 carries, 53 yards
- DET – Kerryon Johnson – 15 carries, 87 yards, TD

**Top receivers**

- CAR – D. J. Moore – 7 receptions, 157 yards, TD
- DET – Kenny Golladay – 8 receptions, 113 yards, TD

In week 11, the Lions hosted the Carolina Panthers. The Panthers took an early lead in the first quarter via a one-yard touchdown pass from Cam Newton to Greg Olsen. The Lions responded with an eight-yard touchdown run from Kerryon Johnson to tie the game. The Lions scored the only points of the second quarter via a 54-yard field goal from Matt Prater, to make the score 10–7 in favor of the Lions at half-time. The Lions extended their lead in the third quarter via a 32-yard field goal by Prater. In the fourth quarter, the Panthers responded with a 12-yard touchdown pass from Newton to Curtis Samuel to tie the game, however, the Lions regained the lead via a 19-yard touchdown pass from Matthew Stafford to Kenny Golladay. Carolina scored another touchdown via an eight-yard pass from Newton to D. J. Moore, then attempted to take the lead with a two-point conversion but failed, making the final score 20–19 in favor of Detroit.

==== Week 12: vs. Chicago Bears ====
Week Twelve: Chicago Bears at Detroit Lions – Game summary

| Quarter | 1 | 2 | 3 | 4 | Total |
|---|---|---|---|---|---|
| **Bears** | 0 | 9 | 0 | 14 | **23** |
| Lions | 0 | 7 | 6 | 3 | **16** |

at Ford Field, Detroit, Michigan

- Date: November 22
- Game time: 12:30 p.m. EST
- Game weather: Played indoors (dome stadium)
- Game attendance: 65,684
- Referee: Brad Allen
- TV announcers (CBS): Jim Nantz, Tony Romo and Tracy Wolfson
- Recap, Gamebook

Game information

**First quarter**

- No scoring.

**Second quarter**

- DET – LeGarrette Blount 4-yard run (Matt Prater kick), 9:03. **Drive: 9 plays, 40 yards, 5:40.** Lions 7–0.
- CHI – Cody Parkey 40-yard field goal, 4:03. **Drive: 11 plays, 53 yards, 5:05.** Lions 7–3.
- CHI – Taquan Mizzell 10-yard pass from Chase Daniel, 0:44. **Drive: 5 plays, 65 yards, 1:30.** Bears 9–7.

**Third quarter**

- DET – LeGarrette Blount 4-yard run, 1:35. **Drive: 6 plays, 80 yards, 3:00.** Lions 13–9.

**Fourth quarter**

- CHI – Tarik Cohen 14-yard pass from Chase Daniel (Cody Parkey kick), 13:40. **Drive: 8 plays, 82 yards, 2:55.** Bears 16–13.
- DET – Matt Prater 20-yard field goal, 7:45. **Drive: 11 plays, 73 yards, 5:56.** Tied 16–16.
- CHI – Eddie Jackson 41-yard interception return (Cody Parkey kick), 6:00. Bears 23–16.

**Top passers**

- CHI – Chase Daniel – 27/37, 230 yards, 2 TD
- DET – Matthew Stafford – 28/38, 236 yards, 2 INT

**Top rushers**

- CHI – Tarik Cohen – 3 carries, 14 yards
- DET – LeGarrette Blount – 19 carries, 88 yards, 2 TD

**Top receivers**

- CHI – Taylor Gabriel – 7 receptions, 49 yards
- DET – Kenny Golladay – 5 receptions, 90 yards

In week 12, the Lions donned retro-style uniforms and hosted a Thanksgiving Day rematch with their division rival the Chicago Bears. After a scoreless first quarter, the Lions got on the board first in the second quarter via a four-yard touchdown run by LeGarrette Blount. The Bears responded with a 40-yard field goal by Cody Parkey and a 10-yard touchdown pass from Chase Daniel to Taquan Mizzell, to make the score 9–7 in favor of Chicago at half-time. Detroit scored the only points of the third quarter via a four-yard touchdown run from Blount, to put the Lions up by four points. In the fourth quarter, however, the Bears took a three-point lead via a 14-yard touchdown pass from Daniel to Tarik Cohen, but the Lions quickly tied it up via a 20-yard field goal by Matt Prater. The Bears regained the lead via a 41-yard interception return by Eddie Jackson, making the final score 23–16 in favor of Chicago.

==== Week 13: vs. Los Angeles Rams ====
Week Thirteen: Los Angeles Rams at Detroit Lions – Game summary

| Quarter | 1 | 2 | 3 | 4 | Total |
|---|---|---|---|---|---|
| **Rams** | 3 | 10 | 3 | 14 | **30** |
| Lions | 0 | 3 | 10 | 3 | **16** |

at Ford Field, Detroit, Michigan

- Date: December 2
- Game time: 1:00 p.m. EST
- Game weather: Played indoors (dome stadium)
- Game attendance: 60,974
- Referee: John Parry
- TV announcers (Fox): Thom Brennaman, Chris Spielman and Shannon Spake
- Recap, Gamebook

Game information

**First quarter**

- LAR – Greg Zuerlein 24-yard field goal, 3:20. **Drive: 10 plays, 74 yards, 4:40.** Rams 3–0.

**Second quarter**

- DET – Matt Prater 28-yard field goal, 12:24. **Drive: 10 plays, 65 yards, 5:53.** Tied 3–3.
- LAR – Robert Woods 8-yard pass from Jared Goff (Greg Zuerlein kick), 2:28. **Drive: 12 plays, 71 yards, 6:09.** Rams 10–3.
- LAR – Greg Zuerlein 47-yard field goal, 0:48. **Drive: 6 plays, 39 yards, 0:50.** Rams 13–3.

**Third quarter**

- DET – Matt Prater 29-yard field goal, 7:56. **Drive: 9 plays, 36 yards, 5:25.** Rams 13–6.
- LAR – Greg Zuerlein 48-yard field goal, 5:51. **Drive: 4 plays, 8 yards, 2:10.** Rams 16–6.
- DET – Taylor Decker 11-yard pass from Matthew Stafford (Matt Prater kick), 3:02. **Drive: 10 plays, 24 yards, 5:18.** Rams 16–13.

**Fourth quarter**

- LAR – Todd Gurley 13-yard run (Greg Zuerlein kick), 6:53. **Drive: 3 plays, 24 yards, 1:20.** Rams 23–13.
- DET – Matt Prater 35-yard field goal, 2:57. **Drive: 8 plays, 58 yards, 3:59.** Rams 23–16.
- LAR – Todd Gurley 2-yard run (Greg Zuerlein kick), 1:54. **Drive: 5 plays, 45 yards, 1:00.** Rams 30–16.

**Top passers**

- LAR – Jared Goff – 17/33, 207 yards, TD, INT
- DET – Matthew Stafford – 20/33, 245 yards, TD, INT

**Top rushers**

- LAR – Todd Gurley – 23 carries, 132 yards, 2 TD
- DET – LeGarrette Blount – 16 carries, 61 yards

**Top receivers**

- LAR – Robert Woods – 5 receptions, 67 yards, TD
- DET – Levine Toilolo – 4 receptions, 90 yards

In week 13, the Lions hosted the Los Angeles Rams. The Rams opened the scoring in the first quarter via a 24-yard field goal from Greg Zuerlein. The Lions tied it up in the second quarter via a 28-yard field goal by Matt Prater. The Rams then scored ten more points via an eight-yard touchdown pass from Jared Goff to Robert Woods and a 47-yard field goal by Zuerlein to make the half–time score 13–3 in favor of Los Angeles. Both teams scored a field goal in the third quarter, first a 29-yard field goal by Prater for the Lions, then a 48-yard field goal by Zuerlein for the Rams. The Lions reduced the Rams' lead to three points via a 11-yard touchdown pass from Matthew Stafford to Taylor Decker. The Rams responded with 14 points in the fourth quarter via two touchdown runs from Todd Gurley, from 13-yards and two-yards, respectively. The Lions added a 35-yard field goal from Prater, making the final score 30–16 in favor of Los Angeles.

==== Week 14: at Arizona Cardinals ====
Week Fourteen: Detroit Lions at Arizona Cardinals – Game summary

| Quarter | 1 | 2 | 3 | 4 | Total |
|---|---|---|---|---|---|
| **Lions** | 0 | 3 | 7 | 7 | **17** |
| Cardinals | 0 | 0 | 0 | 3 | **3** |

at State Farm Stadium, Glendale, Arizona

- Date: December 9
- Game time: 4:25 p.m. EST/2:25 p.m. MST
- Game weather: 70 °F (21 °C), sunny — retractable roof open
- Game attendance: 62,014
- Referee: Shawn Hochuli
- TV announcers (Fox): Tim Brando, Brady Quinn and Shane Bacon
- Recap, Gamebook

Game information

**First quarter**

- No scoring

**Second quarter**

- DET – Matt Prater 47-yard field goal, 9:40. **Drive: 3 plays, 55 yards, 7:56.** Lions 3–0.

**Third quarter**

- DET – Darius Slay 67-yard interception return (Matt Prater kick), 3:16. **Drive: 8 plays, 42 yards, 4:42.** Lions 10–0.

**Fourth quarter**

- ARI – Zane Gonzalez 22-yard field goal, 8:21. **Drive: 9 plays, 62 yards, 5:17.** Lions 10–3.
- DET – Zach Zenner 1-yard run (Matt Prater kick), 4:05. **Drive: 7 plays, 75 yards, 4:09.** Lions 17–3.

**Top passers**

- DET – Matthew Stafford – 15/23, 101 yards
- ARI – Josh Rosen – 26/41, 240 yards, INT

**Top rushers**

- DET – Zach Zenner – 12 carries, 54 yards, TD
- ARI – David Johnson – 15 carries, 49 yards

**Top receivers**

- DET – Theo Riddick – 4 receptions, 30 yards
- ARI – Trent Sherfield – 5 receptions, 77 yards

In week 14, the Lions visited the Arizona Cardinals. After a scoreless first quarter, the Lions scored the only points of the first half via a 47-yard field goal by Matt Prater, to make the score 3–0 in favor of the Lions at half-time. The Lions extended their lead in the third quarter via a 67-yard interception return by Darius Slay. In the fourth quarter, the Cardinals finally got on the board via a 22-yard field goal by Zane Gonzalez to avoid a shutout. The Lions added to their lead with a one-yard run by Zach Zenner to make the final score 17–3 in favor of the Lions.

The win ended the Lions' eight-game road losing streak against the Cardinals, beating them on the road for the first time since the 1993 season.

==== Week 15: at Buffalo Bills ====
Week Fifteen: Detroit Lions at Buffalo Bills – Game summary

| Quarter | 1 | 2 | 3 | 4 | Total |
|---|---|---|---|---|---|
| Lions | 0 | 13 | 0 | 0 | **13** |
| **Bills** | 0 | 7 | 0 | 7 | **14** |

at New Era Field, Orchard Park, New York

- Date: December 16
- Game time: 1:00 p.m. EST
- Game weather: 39 °F (4 °C), rain
- Game attendance: 59,110
- Referee: Jerome Boger
- TV announcers (Fox): Joe Davis, Brady Quinn and Bruce Feldman
- Recap, Gamebook

Game information

**First quarter**

- No scoring

**Second quarter**

- DET – Andy Jones 4-yard pass from Matthew Stafford, 10:45. **Drive: 9 plays, 75 yards, 4:26.** Lions 6–0.
- BUF – Josh Allen 3-yard run (Steven Hauschka kick), 7:55. **Drive: 5 plays, 87 yards, 2:50.** Bills 7–6.
- DET – Zach Zenner 1-yard run (Matt Prater kick), 3:46. **Drive: 9 plays, 77 yards, 4:09.** Lions 13–7.

**Third quarter**

- No scoring

**Fourth quarter**

- BUF – Robert Foster 42-yard pass from Josh Allen (Steven Hauschka kick), 10:26. **Drive: 2 plays, 61 yards, 1:17.** Bills 14–13.

**Top passers**

- DET – Matthew Stafford – 22/29, 208 yards, TD
- BUF – Josh Allen – 13/26, 204 yards, TD

**Top rushers**

- DET – Theo Riddick – 8 carries, 47 yards
- BUF – Keith Ford – 14 carries, 46 yards

**Top receivers**

- DET – Kenny Golladay – 7 receptions, 146 yards
- BUF – Robert Foster – 4 receptions, 108 yards, TD

In week 15, the Lions visited the Buffalo Bills. After a scoreless first quarter, the Lions opened the scoring in the second quarter via a four-yard touchdown pass from Matthew Stafford to Andy Jones. Buffalo responded with a three-yard touchdown run by Josh Allen. The Lions replied with a one-yard touchdown run by Zach Zenner to make the score 13–7 in favor of the Lions at half-time. After a scoreless third quarter, the Bills scored the only points of the second half via a 42-yard touchdown pass from Allen to Robert Foster. The Lions' attempted comeback failed when Matt Prater missed a 45-yard field goal in the fourth quarter, making the final score 14–13 in favor of the Bills. With the loss, the Lions were eliminated from playoff contention.

==== Week 16: vs. Minnesota Vikings ====
Week Sixteen: Minnesota Vikings at Detroit Lions – Game summary

| Quarter | 1 | 2 | 3 | 4 | Total |
|---|---|---|---|---|---|
| **Vikings** | 0 | 14 | 3 | 10 | **27** |
| Lions | 3 | 6 | 0 | 0 | **9** |

at Ford Field, Detroit, Michigan

- Date: December 23
- Game time: 1:00 p.m. EST
- Game weather: Played indoors (dome stadium)
- Game attendance: 61,641
- Referee: Walt Anderson
- TV announcers (Fox): Chris Myers, Daryl Johnston and Laura Okmin
- Recap, Gamebook

Game information

**First quarter**

- DET – Matt Prater 47-yard field goal, 7:30. **Drive: 5 plays, 28 yards, 2:40.** Lions 3–0.

**Second quarter**

- DET – Matt Prater 35-yard field goal, 10:39. **Drive: 9 plays, 21 yards, 4:11.** Lions 6–0.
- DET – Matt Prater 48-yard field goal, 4:05. **Drive: 8 plays, 36 yards, 4:17.** Lions 9–0.
- MIN – Stefon Diggs 8-yard pass from Kirk Cousins (Dan Bailey kick), 1:32. **Drive: 8 plays, 69 yards, 2:33.** Lions 9–7.
- MIN – Kyle Rudolph 44-yard pass from Kirk Cousins (Dan Bailey kick), 0:00. **Drive: 5 plays, 70 yards, 0:36.** Viking 14–9.

**Third quarter**

- MIN – Dan Bailey 24-yard field goal, 8:54. **Drive: 11 plays, 69 yards, 6:06.** Viking 17–9.

**Fourth quarter**

- MIN – Kyle Rudolph 4-yard pass from Kirk Cousins (Dan Bailey kick), 13:25. **Drive: 9 plays, 53 yards, 5:38.** Viking 24–9.
- MIN – Dan Bailey 29-yard field goal, 4:15. **Drive: 4 plays, −1 yards, 2:15.** Viking 27–9.

**Top passers**

- MIN – Kirk Cousins – 21/28, 253 yards, 3 TD
- DET – Matthew Stafford – 18/32, 116 yards

**Top rushers**

- MIN – Dalvin Cook – 16 carries, 73 yards
- DET – Zach Zenner – 8 carries, 45 yards

**Top receivers**

- MIN – Kyle Rudolph – 9 receptions, 122 yards, 2 TD
- DET – Kenny Golladay – 6 receptions, 58 yards

In week 16, the Lions played their final home game of the season when they hosted a rematch with their divisional rival the Minnesota Vikings. The Lions opened the scoring in the first quarter via a 47-yard field goal by Matt Prater and extended their lead in the second quarter via two field goals by Prater, from 35-yardsand 48-yards, respectively. The Vikings responded with two touchdowns, an eight-yard touchdown pass from Kirk Cousins to Stefon Diggs and a 44-yard Hail Mary pass from Cousins to Kyle Rudolph as time expired in the first half, to make the score 14–9 in favor of the Vikings at half-time. The Vikings held the Lions scoreless in the second half and extended their lead in the third quarter via a 24-yard field goal by Dan Bailey, then added 10 more points in the fourth quarter via a four-yard touchdown pass from Cousins to Rudolphand a 29-yard field goal by Bailey, making the final score 27–9 in favor of Minnesota. With the loss, the Lions fell to 5–10 and secured a last place finish in NFC North for the first time since 2012.

==== Week 17: at Green Bay Packers ====
Week Seventeen: Detroit Lions at Green Bay Packers – Game summary

| Quarter | 1 | 2 | 3 | 4 | Total |
|---|---|---|---|---|---|
| **Lions** | 7 | 14 | 3 | 7 | **31** |
| Packers | 0 | 0 | 0 | 0 | **0** |

at Lambeau Field, Green Bay, Wisconsin

- Date: December 30
- Game time: 1:00 p.m. EST/12:00 p.m. CST
- Game weather: 26 °F (−3 °C), cloudy
- Game attendance: 77,341
- Referee: Alex Kemp
- TV announcers (Fox): Justin Kutcher, Robert Smith, Pat McAfee and Sarah Kustok
- Recap, Gamebook

Game information

**First quarter**

- DET – T. J. Jones 5-yard pass from Matthew Stafford (Matt Prater kick), 3:01. **Drive: 12 plays, 56 yards, 5:08.** Lions 7–0.

**Second quarter**

- DET – Levine Toilolo 8-yard pass from Matt Prater (Matt Prater kick), 10:41. **Drive: 11 plays, 78 yards, 5:57.** Lions 14–0.
- DET – Zach Zenner 13-yard run (Matt Prater kick), 1:06. **Drive: 13 plays, 86 yards, 5:31.** Lions 21–0.

**Third quarter**

- DET – Matt Prater 43-yard field goal, 3:12. **Drive: 8 plays, 43 yards, 3:53.** Lions 24–0.

**Fourth quarter**

- DET – T. J. Jones 23-yard pass from Matthew Stafford (Matt Prater kick), 6:53. **Drive: 5 plays, 70 yards, 2:46.** Lions 31–0.

**Top passers**

- DET – Matthew Stafford – 20/32, 266 yards, 2 TD
- GB – DeShone Kizer – 16/35, 132 yards, INT

**Top rushers**

- DET – Zach Zenner – 21 carries, 93 yards, TD
- GB – DeShone Kizer – 4 carries, 40 yards

**Top receivers**

- DET – Brandon Powell – 6 receptions, 103 yards
- GB – Marquez Valdes-Scantling – 3 receptions, 43 yards

To end the season, the Lions visited their divisional rival the Green Bay Packers for a rematch of week 5. The Lions opened the scoring in the first quarter via a five-yard touchdown pass from Matthew Stafford to T. J. Jones. The Lions added 14 points in the second quarter via an eight-yard touchdown pass on a fake field goal attempt from Matt Prater to Levine Toilolo and a 13-yard touchdown run by Zach Zenner, to make the score 21–0 in favor of the Lions at half-time. Detroit scored twice in the second half, first via a 43-yard field goal by Prater in the third quarter, then via a 23-yard touchdown pass from Stafford to Jones in the fourth quarter, to make the final score 31–0 in favor of the Lions, giving them their only shutout win of the season and a 6–10 record. This was also the Lions' first shutout against the Packers since 1973, the first shutout against the Packers in Green Bay since 1970, the first shutout for the Lions since 1996, and their first four-game winning streak against them since the 1982 and 1983 seasons. They also swept the Packers for the second consecutive season.

== Standings ==
=== Division ===
NFC North
| | W | L | T | PCT | DIV | CONF | PF | PA | STK |
|---|---|---|---|---|---|---|---|---|---|
| ^{(3)} Chicago Bears | 12 | 4 | 0 | .750 | 5–1 | 10–2 | 421 | 283 | W4 |
| Minnesota Vikings | 8 | 7 | 1 | .531 | 3–2–1 | 6–5–1 | 360 | 341 | L1 |
| Green Bay Packers | 6 | 9 | 1 | .406 | 1–4–1 | 3–8–1 | 376 | 400 | L1 |
| Detroit Lions | 6 | 10 | 0 | .375 | 2–4 | 4–8 | 324 | 360 | W1 |

=== Conference ===
NFC
| # | Team | Division | W | L | T | PCT | DIV | CONF | SOS | SOV | STK |
|---|---|---|---|---|---|---|---|---|---|---|---|
Division leaders
| 1 (Note: New Orleans finished ahead of LA Rams based on head-to-head victory, claiming the No. 1 seed.) | New Orleans Saints | South | 13 | 3 | 0 | .813 | 4–2 | 9–3 | .482 | .488 | L1 |
| 2 | Los Angeles Rams | West | 13 | 3 | 0 | .813 | 6–0 | 9–3 | .480 | .428 | W2 |
| 3 | Chicago Bears | North | 12 | 4 | 0 | .750 | 5–1 | 10–2 | .430 | .419 | W4 |
| 4 | Dallas Cowboys | East | 10 | 6 | 0 | .625 | 5–1 | 9–3 | .488 | .444 | W2 |
Wild Cards
| 5 | Seattle Seahawks | West | 10 | 6 | 0 | .625 | 3–3 | 8–4 | .484 | .400 | W2 |
| 6 | Philadelphia Eagles | East | 9 | 7 | 0 | .563 | 4–2 | 6–6 | .518 | .486 | W3 |
Did not qualify for the postseason
| 7 | Minnesota Vikings | North | 8 | 7 | 1 | .531 | 3–2–1 | 6–5–1 | .504 | .355 | L1 |
| 8 (Note: Atlanta finished ahead of Washington based on head-to-head victory. Atlanta finished ahead of Carolina based on head-to-head sweep. Washington finished ahead of Carolina based on head-to-head victory.) | Atlanta Falcons | South | 7 | 9 | 0 | .438 | 4–2 | 7–5 | .482 | .348 | W3 |
| 9 | Washington Redskins | East | 7 | 9 | 0 | .438 | 2–4 | 6–6 | .486 | .371 | L2 |
| 10 | Carolina Panthers | South | 7 | 9 | 0 | .438 | 2–4 | 5–7 | .508 | .518 | W1 |
| 11 | Green Bay Packers | North | 6 | 9 | 1 | .406 | 1–4–1 | 3–8–1 | .488 | .417 | L1 |
| 12 | Detroit Lions | North | 6 | 10 | 0 | .375 | 2–4 | 4–8 | .504 | .427 | W1 |
| 13 (Note: NY Giants finished ahead of Tampa Bay based on head-to-head victory.) | New York Giants | East | 5 | 11 | 0 | .313 | 1–5 | 4–8 | .527 | .487 | L3 |
| 14 | Tampa Bay Buccaneers | South | 5 | 11 | 0 | .313 | 2–4 | 4–8 | .523 | .506 | L4 |
| 15 | San Francisco 49ers | West | 4 | 12 | 0 | .250 | 1–5 | 2–10 | .504 | .406 | L2 |
| 16 | Arizona Cardinals | West | 3 | 13 | 0 | .188 | 2–4 | 3–9 | .527 | .302 | L4 |
Tiebreakers (Note: When breaking ties for three or more teams under the NFL's rules, they are first broken within divisions, then comparing only the highest-ranked remaining team from each division.)
