= Tracy Walker (American football) =

American football player (born 1995)

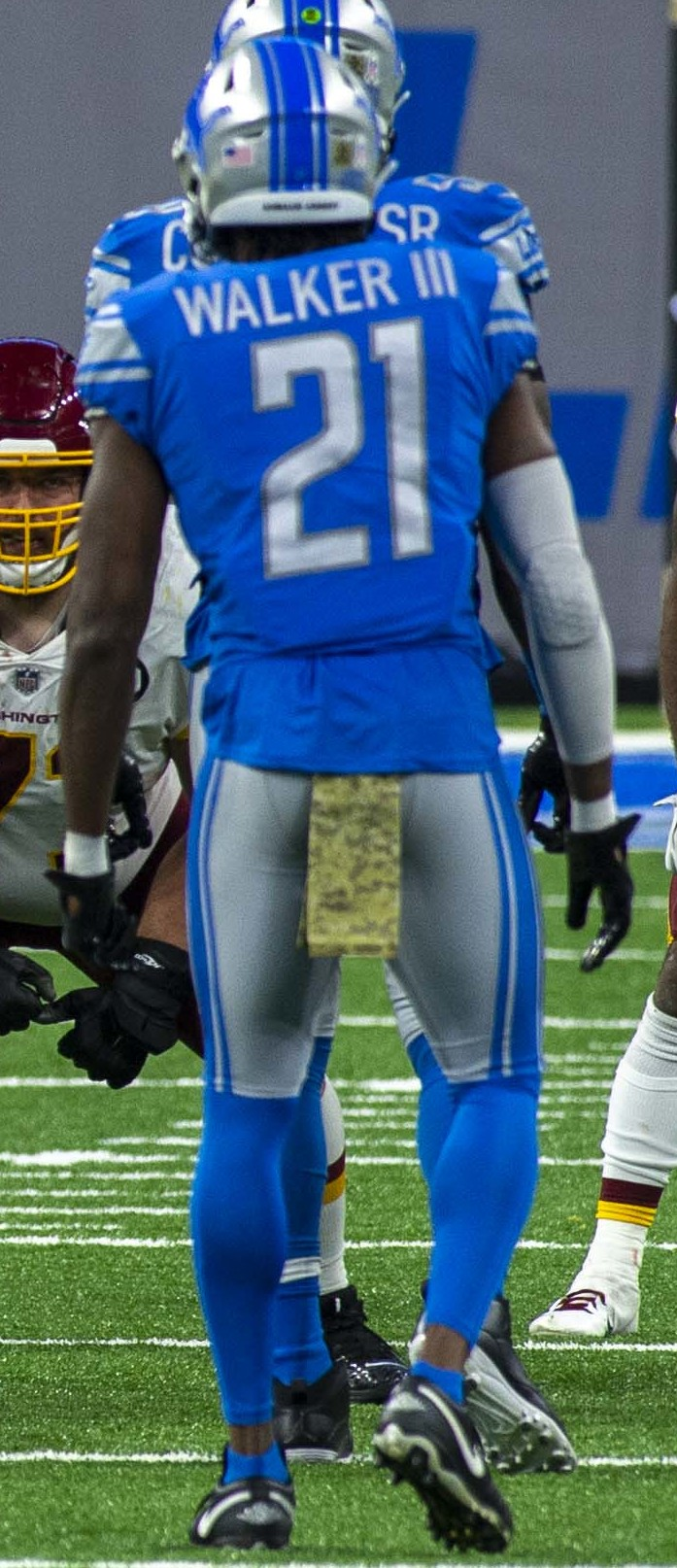
- Walker with the Detroit Lions in 2020

No. 21, 35, 47
- Position: Safety

Personal information
- Born: February 1, 1995 (age 31); Brunswick, Georgia, U.S.
- Listed height: 6 ft 1 in (1.85 m)
- Listed weight: 206 lb (93 kg)

Career information
- High school: Brunswick
- College: Louisiana (2013–2017)
- NFL draft: 2018: 3rd round, 82nd overall pick

Career history
- Detroit Lions (2018–2023); San Francisco 49ers (2024)*
- * Offseason or practice squad member only

Career NFL statistics as of 2024
- Total tackles: 398
- Sacks: 4
- Forced fumbles: 2
- Pass deflections: 23
- Interceptions: 3
- Stats at Pro Football Reference

Tracy Leonard Walker III (born February 1, 1995) is an American former professional football player who was a safety in the National Football League (NFL). He played college football for the Louisiana Ragin' Cajuns.

== Professional career ==
=== Pre-draft ===
On December 16, 2017, it was announced that Walker had accepted his invitation to play in the East-West Shrine Game. Walker impressed scouts and team representatives during Shrine Game practices which added value to his draft stock. On January 20, 2018, Walker played in the 2018 East–West Shrine Game and recorded two tackles and deflected a pass, but dropped an interception and was part of the East team that lost 14–10 to the West. Walker attended the NFL Scouting Combine and completed all of the required combine and positional drills. On April 5, 2018, Walker attended Louisiana's pro day, but chose to stand on his combine numbers and only performed positional drills. At the conclusion of the pre-draft process, Walker was projected to be a fifth or sixth round pick by NFL draft experts and scouts. He was ranked as the seventh best strong safety prospect in the draft by DraftScout.com and was ranked as the 12th best safety by Scouts Inc.

Pre-draft measurables
Height	Weight	Arm length	Hand span	40-yard dash	10-yard split	20-yard split	20-yard shuttle	Three-cone drill	Vertical jump	Broad jump	Bench press
6 ft 0 7/8 in (1.85 m)	206 lb (93 kg)	33 1/2 in (0.85 m)	8 3/4 in (0.22 m)	4.51 s	1.56 s	2.64 s	4.28 s	7.00 s	33 in (0.84 m)	9 ft 11 in (3.02 m)	14 reps
All values from NFL Combine

External videos
- Lions draft Tracy Walker 82nd overall

=== Detroit Lions ===
==== 2018 season ====
The Detroit Lions selected Walker in the third round (82nd overall) of the 2018 NFL draft. Walker was the sixth safety drafted in 2018. On May 16, 2018, the Lions signed Walker to a four-year, $3.51 million contract that includes a signing bonus of $881,988.

Late into a Week 2 matchup against the San Francisco 49ers, Walker intercepted Jimmy Garoppolo for his first and potential game-winning interception, but the interception was overturned after a holding penalty on the Lions. In a Week 11 matchup against the Carolina Panthers, Walker recorded his first interception when he picked off Cam Newton in a contested grab for the ball. Walker ended the season with 21 tackles, two defended passes and one interception. Pro Football Focus rated Walker the fourth best defensive player on the Lions.

==== 2019 season ====
In the offseason, the Lions released veteran Glover Quin which allowed more room for Walker to move up the depth chart. In the Lions' Week 1 debut against the Arizona Cardinals, Walker recorded the most tackles and recorded his second interception in a 27–27 tie. In an unpopular decision, the Lions traded away star safety Quandre Diggs to the Seattle Seahawks, allowing Walker to become the leading safety.

During a 31–26 Week 8 win against the New York Giants, Walker suffered a knee injury during the third quarter causing him to miss three of the next four games.

Walker ended the season with one interception, 103 tackles, and 8 defended passes.

==== 2020 season ====
Walker's performance slowed in 2020, recording zero interceptions and four defended passes. However, Walker shined in Week 17 against the Minnesota Vikings, leading the team with 13 tackles (11 solo) and recording his first career sack on Kirk Cousins during the 37–35 loss.

==== 2021 season ====
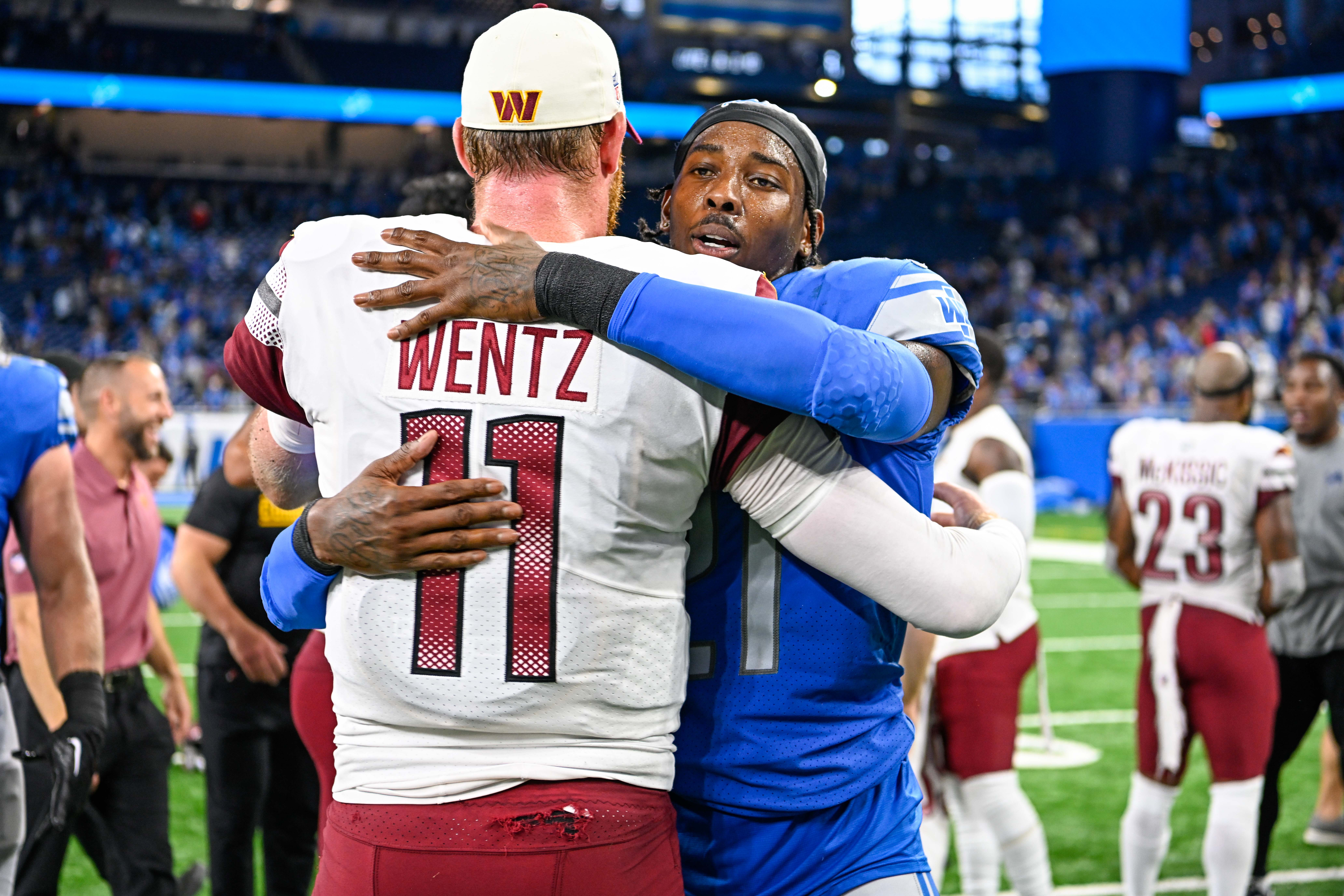
Walker (right) and Carson Wentz in 2022

In Week 18 of the 2021 season, Walker had 13 tackles and an interception in a 37-30 win over the Packers, earning NFC Defensive Player of the Week.

Walker ended the season with 108 tackles, one interception, and 6 defended passes.

==== 2022 season ====
On March 15, 2022, Walker signed a three-year, $25 million contract extension with the Lions through the 2024 season. He started all three of his appearances for Detroit, recording one pass defensed, one sack, and 20 combined tackles. On September 27, Walker was placed on injured reserve after suffering a torn Achilles tendon in Week 3.

==== 2023 season ====
Walker was limited in 2023 coming off of his injury and saw limited action while mainly playing on special teams.

On February 20, 2024, Walker was released by the Lions after six seasons to free cap space for other players.

=== San Francisco 49ers ===
On August 8, 2024, Walker signed with the San Francisco 49ers. He was released by the 49ers on August 27, and was subsequently re-signed to the team's practice squad. Walker was released by the 49ers again on September 24.

On August 6, 2025, Walker was suspended 12 games by the NFL for undisclosed reasons.

== NFL career statistics ==
Year	Team	Games		Tackles				Interceptions						Fumbles			
Year	Team	GP	GS	Cmb	Solo	Ast	Sck	PD	Int	Yds	Avg	Lng	TD	FF	FR	Yds	TD
2018	DET	16	0	21	18	3	0.0	2	1	0	0.0	0	0	0	0	0	0
2019	DET	13	12	103	82	21	0.0	8	1	0	0.0	0	0	1	0	0	0
2020	DET	15	7	87	64	23	1.0	4	0	0	0.0	0	0	0	0	0	0
2021	DET	15	15	108	74	34	1.0	6	1	5	5.0	5	0	0	0	0	0
2022	DET	3	3	20	11	9	1.0	1	0	0	0.0	0	0	0	0	0	0
2023	DET	17	6	59	42	17	1.0	2	0	0	0.0	0	0	1	0	0	0
Career		79	43	398	291	107	4.0	23	3	5	1.7	5	0	2	0	0	0

== Personal life ==
Walker is second cousins with former Lions teammate Darius Slay. Another second cousin, Ahmaud Arbery, was murdered in February 2020.
