= Nick Bawden =

American football player (born 1996)

No. 46, 48
- Position: Fullback

Personal information
- Born: June 22, 1996 (age 30); Los Gatos, California, U.S.
- Listed height: 6 ft 2 in (1.88 m)
- Listed weight: 245 lb (111 kg)

Career information
- High school: Los Gatos
- College: San Diego State (2014–2017)
- NFL draft: 2018: 7th round, 237th overall pick

Career history
- Detroit Lions (2018–2020); New York Jets (2021–2023); Houston Texans (2024)*
- * Offseason or practice squad member only

Career NFL statistics as of 2023
- Rushing yards: 4
- Rushing average: 2.0
- Rushing touchdowns: 1
- Receptions: 8
- Receiving yards: 58
- Stats at Pro Football Reference

Charles Nicholas Bawden (born June 22, 1996) is an American former professional football player who was a fullback in the National Football League (NFL). He played college football for the San Diego State Aztecs.

== College career ==
Bawden began his collegiate career as a quarterback at San Diego State University. During his freshman season, he started two games for the Aztecs, completing 13 of 38 passes for 147 yards with a touchdown and two interceptions, he then switched to the fullback position after the season. He caught 15 passes for 137 yards as a junior, and 15 for 103 yards and his first touchdown as a senior.

In back to back years, Bawden was the lead blocker for two different 2,000 yard rushers in Donnel Pumphrey and Rashaad Penny. This was the first time this had been done in the history of college football. Both of those running backs were also the leading rushers in college football in 2016 and 2017. Nick Cardosi

== Professional career ==
Pre-draft measurables
Height	Weight	Arm length	Hand span	Wingspan	40-yard dash	10-yard split	20-yard split	20-yard shuttle	Three-cone drill	Broad jump
6 ft 1 7/8 in (1.88 m)	245 lb (111 kg)	30 1/2 in (0.77 m)	9 1/4 in (0.23 m)	6 ft 0 7/8 in (1.85 m)	4.72 s	1.62 s	2.75 s	4.37 s	7.16 s	9 ft 1 in (2.77 m)
All values from NFL Combine/Pro Day

=== Detroit Lions ===
Bawden was selected by the Detroit Lions in the seventh round (237th overall) of the 2018 NFL draft. On June 6, 2018, it was reported that Bawden suffered a torn ACL in organized team activities and was ruled out for the 2018 season. He was placed on injured reserve on July 24, 2018.

On November 20, 2019, Bawden was placed on injured reserve.

On August 31, 2020, Bawden was placed on injured reserve with a knee injury. He was waived on June 3, 2021.

=== New York Jets ===
On September 23, 2021, Bawden signed with the practice squad of the New York Jets. He was promoted to the active roster on November 24.

On March 13, 2022, Bawden was re-signed by the Jets. He was placed on injured reserve on August 30.

On March 22, 2023, Bawden re-signed with the Jets. On September 25 against the New England Patriots, Bawden scored his first career touchdown on a one–yard carry. He was waived on December 20, to clear a roster spot for quarterback Aaron Rodgers and re-signed to the practice squad the following day. Bawden signed a reserve/futures contract with the Jets on January 9, 2024. Bawden was released by the Jets on July 30, 2024.

=== Houston Texans ===
On August 21, 2024, Bawden signed with the Houston Texans. He was released on August 27.

== NFL career statistics ==
Legend
**Bold**	Career high

Year	Team	Games		Rushing					Receiving					Fumbles	
Year	Team	GP	GS	Att	Yds	Avg	Lng	TD	Rec	Yds	Avg	Lng	TD	Fum	Lost
2018	DET	0	0	Did not play due to injury											
2019	DET	10	**2**	–	–	–	–	–	**4**	17	4.3	10	0	–	–
2020	DET	0	0	Did not play due to injury											
2021	NYJ	9	1	–	–	–	–	–	1	20	**20**	**20**	0	–	–
2022	NYJ	0	0	Did not play due to injury											
2023	NYJ	**16**	**2**	**2**	**4**	**2**	**3**	**1**	3	**21**	7	8	0	–	–
Career		35	5	2	4	2	3	1	8	58	7.3	20	0	0	0
