= Levine Toilolo =

American football player (born 1991)

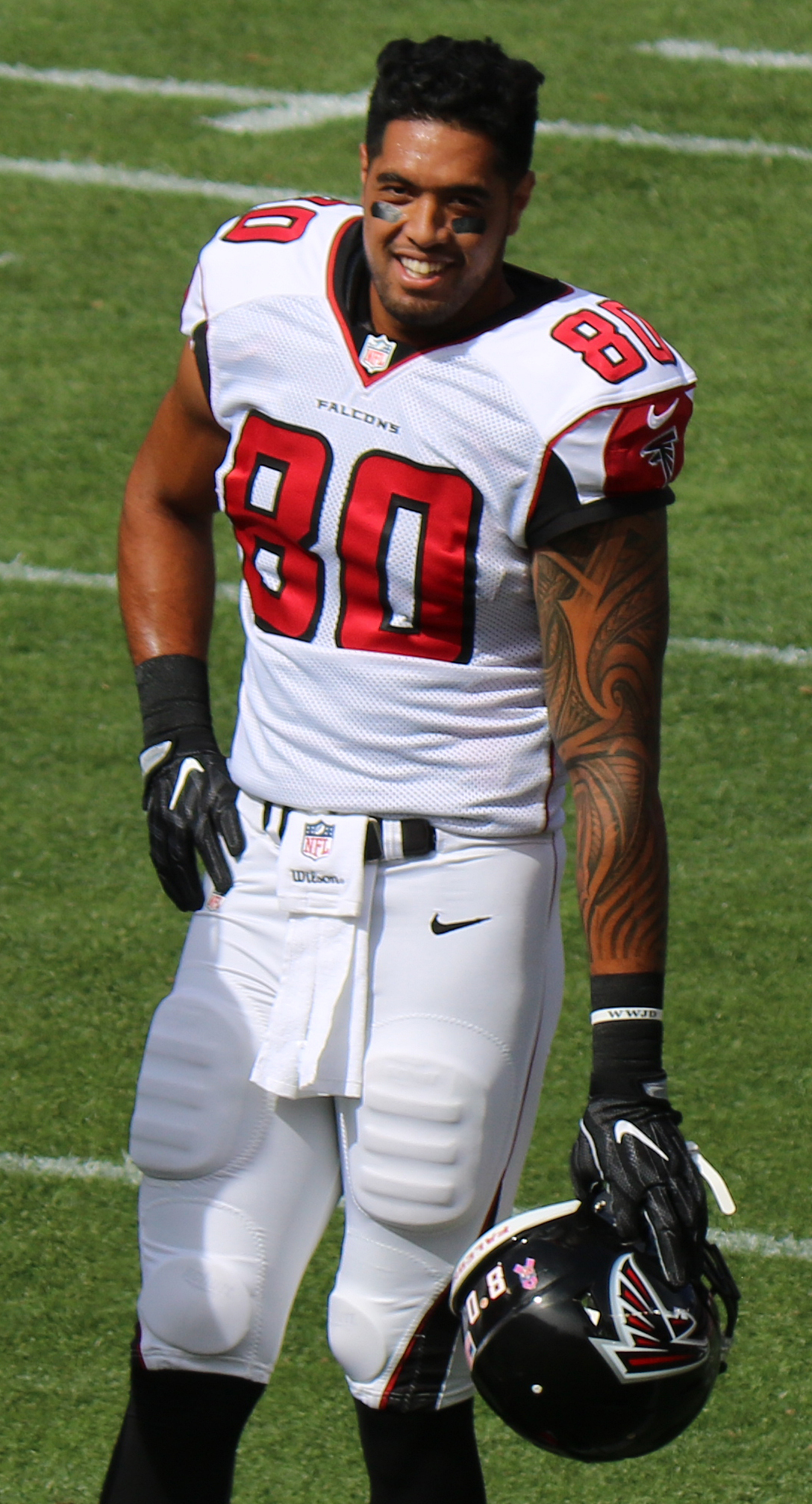
- Toilolo with the Atlanta Falcons in 2016

No. 80, 87, 83, 85
- Position: Tight end

Personal information
- Born: July 30, 1991 (age 35); San Diego, California, U.S.
- Listed height: 6 ft 8 in (2.03 m)
- Listed weight: 268 lb (122 kg)

Career information
- High school: Helix (La Mesa, California)
- College: Stanford (2009–2012)
- NFL draft: 2013: 4th round, 133rd overall pick

Career history
- Atlanta Falcons (2013–2017); Detroit Lions (2018); San Francisco 49ers (2019); New York Giants (2020–2021)

Career NFL statistics
- Receptions: 102
- Receiving yards: 1,042
- Receiving touchdowns: 8
- Stats at Pro Football Reference

Levine Joseph Toilolo (born July 30, 1991) is an American former professional football player who was a tight end in the National Football League (NFL). He played college football for the Stanford Cardinal and was selected by the Atlanta Falcons in the fourth round of the 2013 NFL draft. Toilolo also played for the Detroit Lions, San Francisco 49ers, and New York Giants.

== Early life ==
Toilolo was born in San Diego, California. While attending Helix High School in La Mesa, he played for the Helix Highlanders high school football team.

== College career ==
Toilolo attended Stanford University, where he played for the Stanford Cardinal football team from 2009 to 2012. Toilolo finished his college career with 50 receptions for 763 yards and 10 touchdowns. Toilolo decided to forgo his senior season and enter the 2013 NFL Draft.

== Professional career ==
=== Pre-draft ===
On January 8, 2013, it was announced that Toilolo would forgo his last year of collegiate eligibility and enter the 2013 NFL draft. He was one of 19 collegiate tight ends to receive an invitation to the NFL Scouting Combine in Indianapolis, Indiana. Toilolo had a mediocre performance as he did not display an ability to receive well due to having a few drops. On March 21, 2013, Toilolo opted to attend Stanford's pro day, along with 12 other teammates. He performed the majority of drills, but was only able to have better measurements and times in the bench press (19 reps), vertical jump (33 1/2 in or 850 mm), and broad jump (9 ft 9 in or 2.97 m). Toilolo attended only one private workout with the Atlanta Falcons, which was the team he was linked to throughout the draft process. At the conclusion of the pre-draft process, Toilolo was projected to be a fifth round pick by NFL draft experts and scouts. He was ranked the eighth best tight end prospect in the draft by NFLDraftScout.com.

Pre-draft measurables
Height	Weight	Arm length	Hand span	40-yard dash	10-yard split	20-yard split	20-yard shuttle	Three-cone drill	Vertical jump	Broad jump	Bench press
6 ft 8 1/8 in (2.04 m)	260 lb (118 kg)	34 1/2 in (0.88 m)	10 1/4 in (0.26 m)	4.86 s	1.70 s	2.83 s	4.57 s	7.09 s	33.5 in (0.85 m)	9 ft 9 in (2.97 m)	19 reps
All values from NFL Combine/Pro Day

=== Atlanta Falcons ===
==== 2013 season ====
The Atlanta Falcons selected Toilolo in the fourth round (133rd overall) in the 2013 NFL draft. He was the second tight end selected from Stanford in 2013, behind former teammate Zach Ertz, who was selected by the Philadelphia Eagles in the second round (35th overall).

On May 21, 2013, the Falcons signed Toilolo to a four-year, $2.46 million contract with a signing bonus of $300,584. Throughout training camp, he competed against Chase Coffman for the job as the backup tight end behind Tony Gonzalez. Head coach Mike Smith named Toilolo the third tight end on the depth chart behind Gonzalez and Coffman.

Toilolo made his NFL debut in the season-opening 23–17 road loss to the New Orleans Saints, but recorded no statistics. In the next game against the St. Louis Rams, Toilolo had his first career reception on a four-yard pass from Matt Ryan during the fourth quarter of the 31–24 victory. The following week against the Miami Dolphins, Toilolo made his first career start and scored his first NFL touchdown on a two-yard pass from Ryan in the third quarter of the 27–23 road loss.

During Week 5 against the New York Jets on Monday Night Football, Toilolo caught two passes for a season-high 15 yards and a touchdown in the narrow 30–28 loss. Three weeks later against the Arizona Cardinals, he recorded a season-high three receptions for six yards in a 27–13 loss.

Toilolo finished his rookie year with 11 receptions for 55 yards and two touchdowns in 16 games and three starts.

==== 2014 season ====
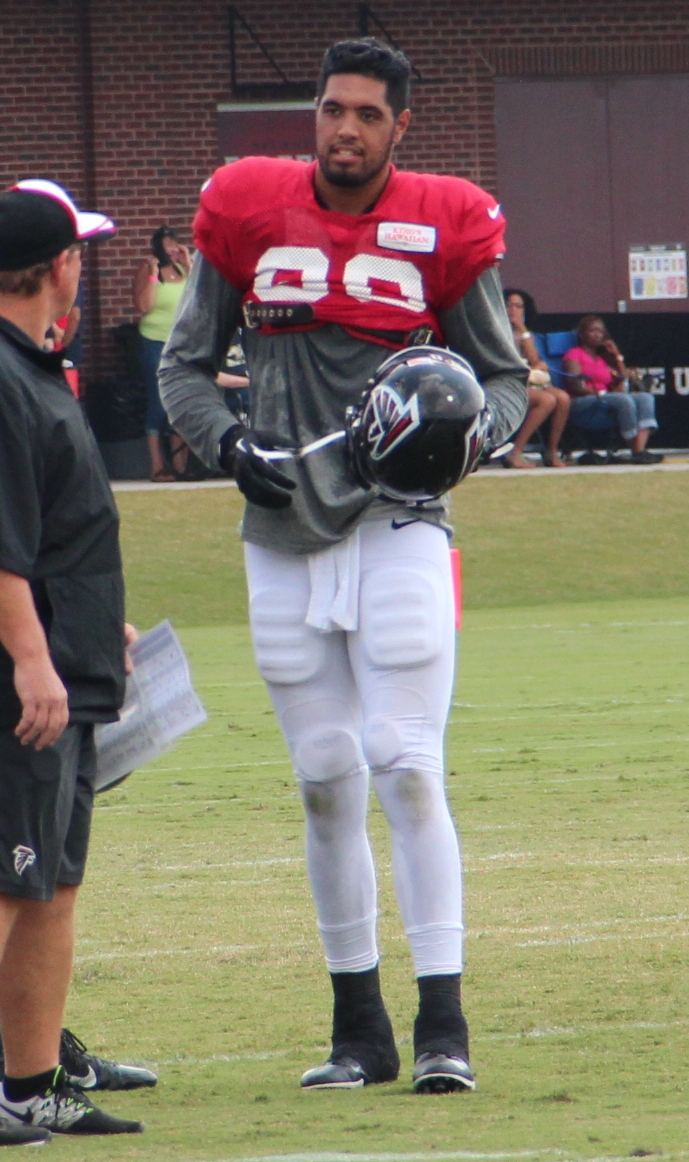
Toilolo in 2014

Toilolo was slated to become the starting tight end following the retirement of Tony Gonzalez and the departure of Chase Coffman in free agency. Throughout training camp, he competed with Mickey Shuler Jr. and Bear Pascoe for the starting tight end position. Head coach Mike Smith named Toilolo the starting tight end to start the regular season.

Toilolo started in the season-opener against the Saints and caught three passes for 19 yards and a touchdown during the 37–34 overtime victory. During a Week 6 27–13 loss to the Chicago Bears, he recorded three receptions for a season-high 34 yards.

During a Week 13 29–18 victory over the Cardinals, Toilolo had a season-high four receptions for 15 yards and his second touchdown of the season. Three weeks later against the Saints, Toilolo tied his season-high of four receptions for 17 yards in the 30–14 road victory.

Toilolo finished his second professional season with 31 receptions for 238 yards and two touchdowns in 16 games and starts. Head coach Mike Smith was fired after the Falcons finished with a 6–10 record in 2014.

==== 2015 season ====
Toilolo faced stiff competition for the starting tight end job after the Falcons hired Dan Quinn as their new head coach. Toilolo was named the backup tight end to newly acquired free agent Jacob Tamme after beating out Tony Moeaki and Mickey Shuler Jr.

Toilolo was mainly used for his blocking in the 2015 season, recording seven receptions for 44 yards in 16 games and 15 starts.

==== 2016 season ====
Toilolo entered training camp competing for the role as the backup tight end to Jacob Tamme against former Stanford teammate Austin Hooper, who was selected by the Falcons in the third round of the 2016 NFL draft. Head coach Dan Quinn named Toilolo the third string tight end to begin the regular season, behind Tamme and Hooper.

During a narrow Week 6 26–24 road loss to the Seattle Seahawks, Toilolo recorded three receptions for 69 yards and a 46-yard touchdown. Three weeks later against the Tampa Bay Buccaneers on Thursday Night Football, he caught a 32-yard touchdown in the 43–28 road victory. On November 10, Toilolo was named the starting tight end after Jacob Tamme suffered a season-ending shoulder injury. Toilolo had one reception in each of the last six games of the season.

Toilolo finished the 2016 season with 13 receptions for 234 yards and two touchdowns in 16 games and 11 starts. The Falcons finished atop the NFC South with an 11–5 record and qualified for the playoffs as the #2-seed. In the Divisional Round against the Seahawks, Toilolo started in his first career playoff game and recorded two receptions for 26 yards during the 36–20 victory. During the NFC Championship Game against the Green Bay Packers, Toilolo had a five-yard reception in the 44–21 victory as the Falcons advanced to Super Bowl LI. He started in the Super Bowl against the New England Patriots but recorded no statistics during the 34–28 overtime loss.

==== 2017 season ====
On March 9, 2017, the Falcons signed Toilolo to a three-year, $12 million contract extension with a signing bonus of $3 million. Throughout training camp, Toilolo competed to retain the starting tight end position against Austin Hooper and rookie Eric Saubert. Head coach Dan Quinn named Toilolo the second tight end behind Hooper to begin the regular season.

During Week 3 against the Detroit Lions, Toilolo made his first start of the season, but recorded no statistics in the 30–26 road victory. In the next game against the Buffalo Bills, Toilolo had a season-high three receptions for 21 yards during the 23–17 loss. During a Week 11 34–31 road victory over the Seahawks on Monday Night Football, he caught two passes for a season-high 31 yards and his only touchdown of the season.

Toilolo finished the 2017 season with 12 receptions for 122 yards and a touchdown in 15 games and 12 starts. The Falcons finished third in the NFC South with a 10–6 record and qualified for the playoffs as the #6-seed. In the Divisional Round against the Philadelphia Eagles, Toilolo recorded a 12-yard reception during the 15–10 road loss.

On March 2, 2018, Toilolo was released by the Falcons.

=== Detroit Lions ===
On March 28, 2018, Toilolo signed a one-year contract with the Detroit Lions.

Toilolo made his Lions debut in the season-opener against the New York Jets on Monday Night Football and finished the 48–17 loss with a seven-yard reception. During a Week 13 30–16 loss to the Los Angeles Rams, Toilolo recorded season highs with four receptions for 90 yards. In the team's regular season finale against the Green Bay Packers, he caught four passes for 43 yards and his only touchdown of the season during the 31–0 shutout road victory.

Toilolo finished the 2018 season with 21 receptions for 263 yards and a touchdown in 16 games (including 10 starts).

=== San Francisco 49ers ===
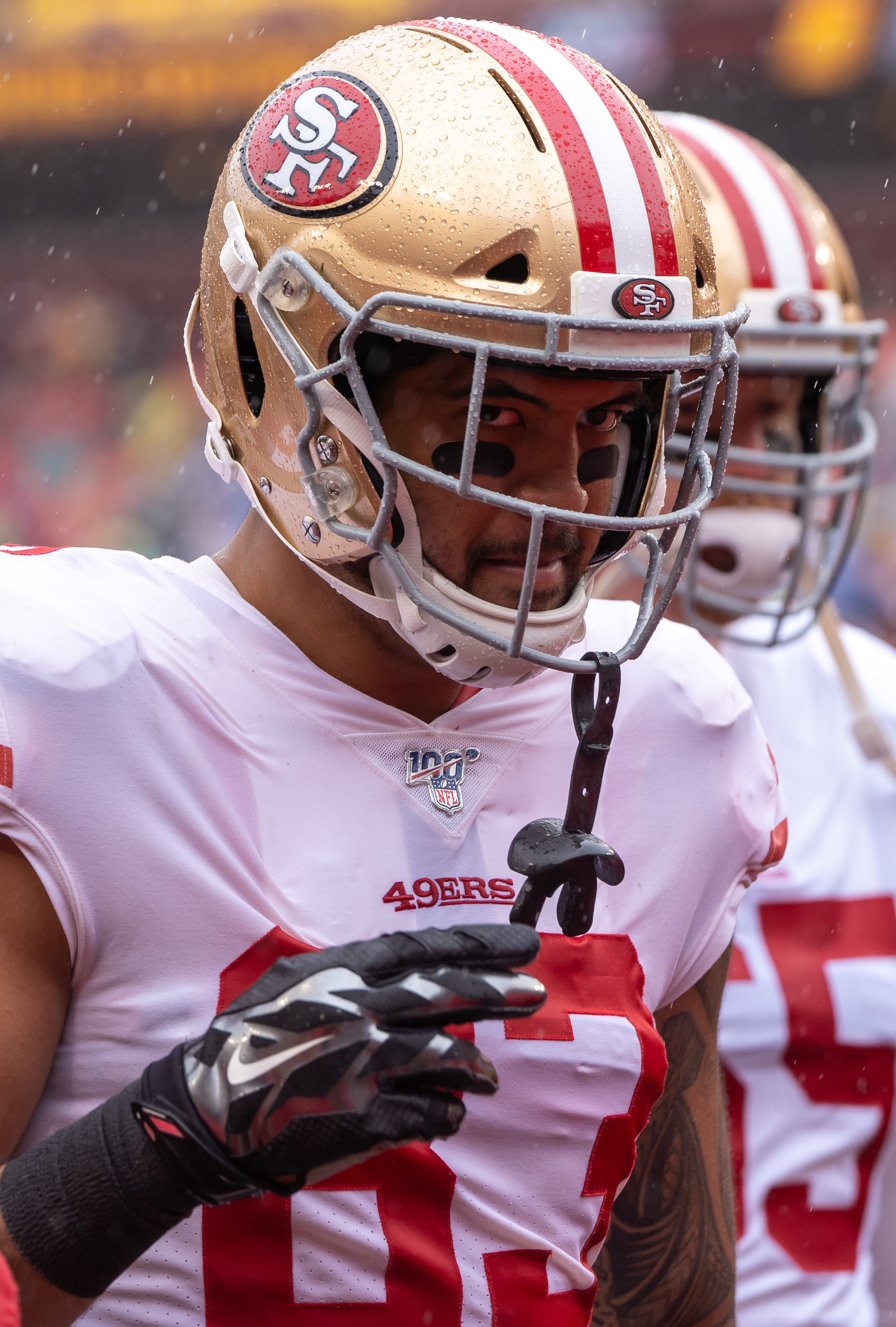
Toilolo in 2019

On May 15, 2019, Toilolo signed a one-year contract with the San Francisco 49ers. Toilolo made his 49ers debut in the season-opening 31–17 road victory over the Tampa Bay Buccaneers, but recorded no statistics. During Week 6 against the Los Angeles Rams, Toilolo had his first reception of the season on an eight-yard pass from Jimmy Garoppolo in the third quarter of the 20–7 road victory. Toilolo was mainly used for his blocking in the 2019 season, recording two receptions for 10 yards in 13 games. The 49ers finished atop the NFC West with a 13–3 record and qualified for the playoffs as the #1-seed. The team reached Super Bowl LIV, but lost 31–20 to the Kansas City Chiefs.

=== New York Giants ===
==== 2020 season ====
On March 26, 2020, Toilolo signed a two-year contract with the New York Giants. Toilolo made his Giants debut in the season-opener against the Pittsburgh Steelers on Monday Night Football and finished the 26–16 loss with a 13-yard reception. Overall, Toilolo finished the 2020 season with five receptions for 46 yards in 16 games (two starts).

==== 2021 season ====
On August 4, 2021, Toilolo tore his Achilles tendon during practice, ending his season before it started.

== NFL career statistics ==
=== Regular season ===
Year	Team	Games		Receiving					Fumbles	
Year	Team	GP	GS	Rec	Yds	Avg	Lng	TD	Fum	Lost
2013	ATL	16	3	11	55	5.0	12	2	0	0
2014	ATL	16	16	31	238	7.7	20	2	1	1
2015	ATL	16	7	7	44	6.3	11	0	0	0
2016	ATL	16	11	13	264	20.3	46	2	0	0
2017	ATL	15	12	12	122	10.2	25	1	0	0
2018	DET	16	10	21	263	12.5	39	1	0	0
2019	SF	13	0	2	10	10.8	24	2	0	0
2020	NYG	16	2	5	46	9.2	14	0	0	0
2021	NYG	0	0	Did not play due to injury						
Career		124	69	102	1,042	10.2	46	8	1	1

=== Postseason ===
Year	Team	Games		Receiving					Fumbles	
Year	Team	GP	GS	Rec	Yds	Avg	Lng	TD	Fum	Lost
2016	ATL	3	3	3	31	10.3	18	0	0	0
2017	ATL	2	2	1	12	12.0	12	0	0	0
2019	SF	3	0	0	0	0	0	0	0	0
Career		8	5	4	43	10.8	18	0	0	0
