= Quandre Diggs =

American football player (born 1993)

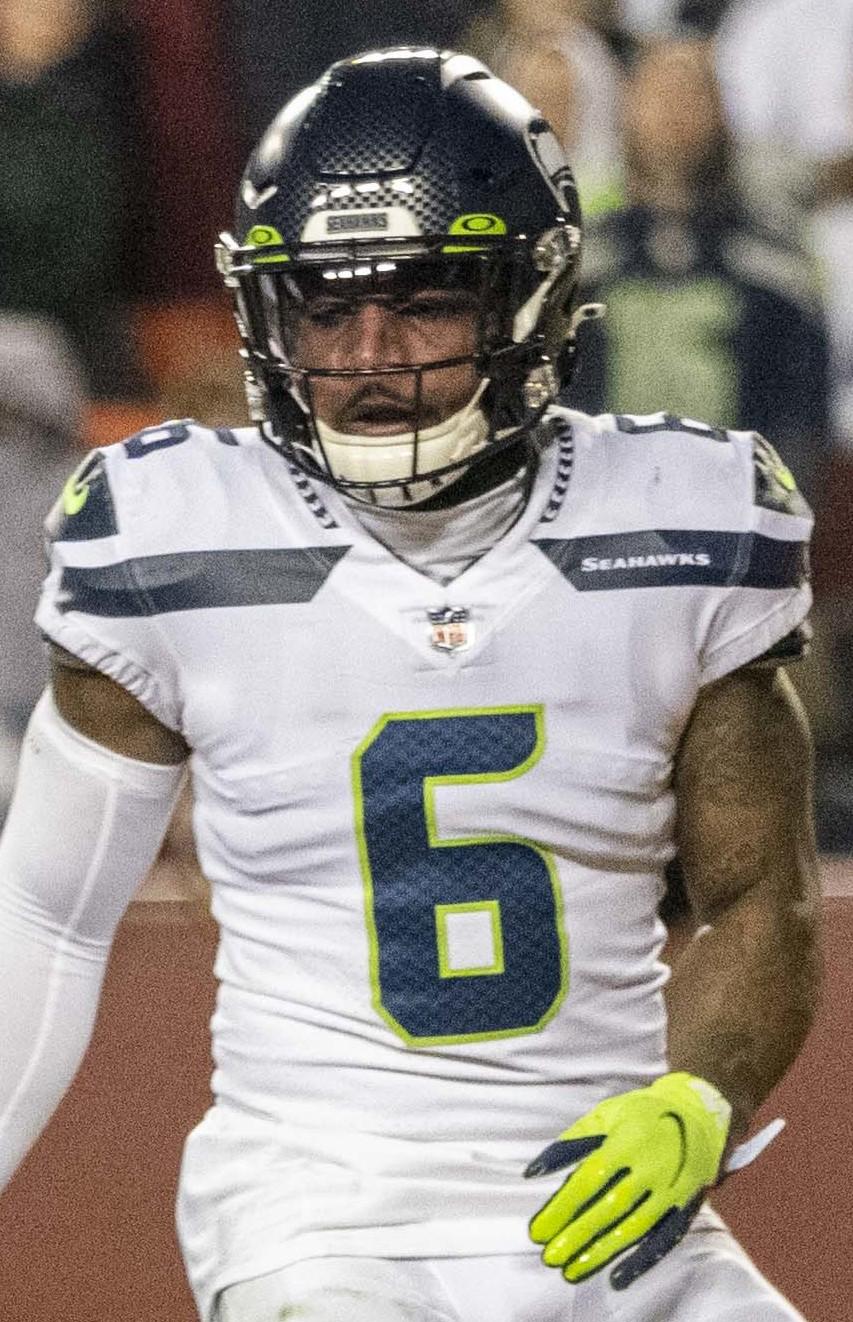
- Diggs with the Seattle Seahawks in 2021

Profile
- Positions: Safety, cornerback, return specialist

Personal information
- Born: January 22, 1993 (age 33); Angleton, Texas, U.S.
- Listed height: 5 ft 9 in (1.75 m)
- Listed weight: 197 lb (89 kg)

Career information
- High school: Angleton
- College: Texas (2011–2014)
- NFL draft: 2015: 6th round, 200th overall pick

Career history
- Detroit Lions (2015–2019); Seattle Seahawks (2019–2023); Tennessee Titans (2024–2025); Seattle Seahawks (2025)

Awards and highlights
- Super Bowl champion (LX); 3× Pro Bowl (2020–2022); 2× Second-team All-Big 12 (2011, 2014); Big 12 Defensive Freshman of the Year (2011); Freshman All-American (2011)

Career NFL statistics as of 2025
- Total tackles: 652
- Sacks: 1.0
- Forced fumbles: 5
- Fumble recoveries: 2
- Pass deflections: 57
- Interceptions: 24
- Defensive touchdowns: 2
- Stats at Pro Football Reference

Quandre Diggs (born January 22, 1993) is an American professional football defensive back. He played college football for the Texas Longhorns, and was selected by the Detroit Lions in the sixth round of the 2015 NFL draft. He played his first two years in the NFL as a cornerback before being moved to safety. In 2019, Diggs was traded to the Seattle Seahawks. After a spell with the Tennessee Titans, Diggs returned to the Seahawks in 2025, winning Super Bowl LX.

== Early life ==
Diggs attended Angleton High School, where he was a four-year letterman on the football team, three-year letterman in track and two-year letterman in basketball. As a member of the Angleton Wildcats he played offense, defense and special teams earning honors in all three phases. He played cornerback and safety for all four seasons, and quarterback, kick returner and punt returner for his last three seasons.

He made 2nd team all-district on defense as a freshman. As a sophomore he was named first-team all-district on defense, District Offensive MVP and Special Teams Player of the Year as he helped Angleton to a co-District championship and the regionals of the 4A Texas State Playoffs. The next year he was named 2nd team all-state as a kick returner; 2nd Team ESPN Rise as an all-purpose back; District MVP, and first-team offense as he helped Angleton to a District Championship and a return to the regionals of the 2009 Texas State Playoffs. In his senior year he was named 1st team all-state as a kick returner and second-team all-state on defense. He repeated as District MVP and helped Angleton make the playoffs again.

He was a prep All-American who played in the 2011 Under Armour All-American Game. He was considered a four-star recruit by ESPN.com, and was listed as the top-ranked cornerback in the nation in the Class of 2011.

== College career ==
Diggs played college football at Texas from 2011 to 2014 under head coaches Mack Brown (2011–2013) and Charlie Strong (2014).

He had a breakout freshman year, playing in every game and starting 11 of them on defense while also returning punts and kickoffs. He had four tackles, one tackle for loss, one interception and one pass breakup against Kansas and earned honorable mention for the CFPA Defensive Back of the Week. Against Texas A&M, he had two punt returns for 95 yards, including an 81 yarder that was 5th longest in school history at the time. For this he received honorable mention for Punt Returner of the Week by College Football Performance Awards. He had a team-leading 4 interceptions on the season, tying the school record for interceptions by a freshman, and a team-leading 15 pass break-ups, the 2nd most by a freshman in school history. He helped the Longhorns make it to, and win, the 2011 Holiday Bowl. At the end of the season he was named the Big 12 Conference Defensive Freshman of the Year, a consensus Freshman All-American, and second-team All-Big 12/honorable mention by the Coaches/AP. He had 19 returns that season, tied for 7th most in a season in school history at the time.

In his sophomore year he started every game at cornerback. In the Oklahoma game he had the school's first blocked extra point for a score in 13 years. He led the team in interceptions and pass break-ups and helped the Longhorns reach the 2012 Alamo Bowl and finish the season ranked #18/#19.

In 2013, he started the season as on the Nagurski Trophy, Thorpe Award and CFPA Defensive Back Awards watch lists. He started every game at cornerback but one. He had his streak of 26 straight starts snapped against Kansas State when the Longhorns started three linebackers. At the end of the season was named All-Big 12 Honorable Mention by the coaches and made the Big 12 Commissioner’s Honor Roll. He helped the Longhorns return to the Alamo Bowl.

In his senior year, Diggs was a team captain and he started all 13 games at cornerback/nickleback, including the 2014 Texas Bowl. He started the season on the watch list for the Chuck Bednarik Award, Jim Thorpe Awards, the Nagurski Trophy and the CFPA Defensive Back Award. He became the first Longhorn to lead the team in pass breakups three seasons in a row. At the end of the season, he was a 1st team All-Big 12 choice by ESPN and was again a 2nd team choice by the AP and Coaches. In December he received his bachelor’s degree in physical culture and sports.

He ended his collegiate career tied for ninth on the University of Texas all-time interceptions list with 11 and tied for ninth with 37 career pass breakups.

He played in 52 career games, of which he started 49.

== Professional career ==
=== Pre-draft ===
On January 24, 2015, Diggs played in the 2015 Senior Bowl and recorded four solo tackles and an interception with a 41 yard return to help the North defeat the South 34–13.

He attended the 2015 NFL Scouting Combine and completed all of the combine drills. He finished eighth among all participating cornerbacks in the bench press, 12th in the short shuttle, and finished 19th among cornerbacks in the 40-yard dash.

On March 24, 2015, Diggs attended Texas's pro day, but opted to stand on the majority of his combine numbers and only performed positional drills and broad jump. He added six inches to his broad jump from the combine,a reaching 9 ft 11 in (3.02 m).

At the conclusion of the pre-draft process, Diggs was projected to be a seventh round pick by the majority of NFL draft experts and scouts. He was ranked the 10th best cornerback in the draft by Bleacher Report, was ranked the 21st best cornerback by WalterFootball.com, and was ranked the 30th best cornerback prospect in the draft by DraftScout.com.

External videos
- Quandre Diggs' NFL Combine Workout
- Quandre Diggs' Senior Bowl interception

Pre-draft measurables
Height	Weight	Arm length	Hand span	Wingspan	40-yard dash	10-yard split	20-yard split	20-yard shuttle	Three-cone drill	Vertical jump	Broad jump	Bench press
5 ft 9 1/8 in (1.76 m)	196 lb (89 kg)	29 5/8 in (0.75 m)	9 5/8 in (0.24 m)	5 ft 11 5/8 in (1.82 m)	4.56 s	1.65 s	2.70 s	4.15 s	7.22 s	35.5 in (0.90 m)	9 ft 11 in (3.02 m)	17 reps
All values from NFL Combine/Pro Day

=== Detroit Lions ===
External videos
- Lions draft Quandre Diggs 200th overall

The Detroit Lions selected Diggs in the sixth round (200th overall) of the 2015 NFL draft. He was the 26th cornerback drafted in 2015.

==== 2015 ====
On May 7, 2015, the Detroit Lions signed Diggs to a four-year, $2.39 million contract that includes a signing bonus of $115,352.

Throughout training camp, Diggs competed for the role as the first-team nickelback against Bill Bentley, Nevin Lawson, and Mohammed Seisay. Head coach Jim Caldwell named Diggs the backup nickelback, behind Nevin Lawson, to begin the regular season.

He made his professional regular season debut in the Lions' season-opener at the San Diego Chargers and recorded two solo tackles in their 33–28 loss. Diggs made his first career tackle on Keenan Allen, stopping a five-yard reception in the fourth quarter. On October 23, 2015, Diggs earned his first career start and recorded four combined tackles in their 28–19 loss to the Minnesota Vikings in Week 7. The following week, he was elevated to first-team nickelback replacing Nevin Lawson who was moved to outside cornerback after Rashean Mathis sustained a concussion the previous week. On November 22, 2015, Diggs collected a season-high six combined tackles and a pass deflection in the Lions' 18–13 win against the Oakland Raiders in Week 11. He finished his rookie season with 38 combined tackles (31 solo) and six pass deflections in 16 games and four starts. He finished the season with the 33rd highest overall grade from Pro Football Focus (PFF).

==== 2016 ====
Diggs entered training camp slated as the No.1 nickelback on the depth chart, but saw minor competition from Crezdon Butler. Defensive coordinator Teryl Austin named Diggs the first-team nickelback and third cornerback on the depth chart to start the season, behind Darius Slay and Nevin Lawson.

In Week 6, he collected five solo tackles during a 31–28 victory against the Los Angeles Rams. It was his third consecutive game with five solo tackles. On November 24, 2016, Diggs recorded a season-high six solo tackles in the Lions' 16–13 victory against the Vikings in Week 12. On December 6, 2016, the Detroit Lions placed Diggs on injured reserve after he suffered a pectoral injury during a Week 13 victory at the New Orleans Saints. Diggs finished the 2016 season with 44 combined tackles (40 solo) and a pass deflections in 12 games and four starts. He earned an overall grade of 49.5 from PFF in 2016 and ranked 95th among the 111 qualifying cornerbacks.

==== 2017 ====
During training camp, Diggs competed to be the starting nickelback against D. J. Hayden and Jamal Agnew. Head coach Jim Caldwell named Diggs the first-team nickelback on and the fifth cornerback on the Lions' depth chart, behind Darius Slay, Nevin Lawson, Teez Tabor, and D.J. Hayden, to start the season.

He started in the Lions' season-opener against the Arizona Cardinals and made a season-high three pass deflections and three solo tackles in their 35–23 victory. In late November, Tavon Wilson injured his shoulder and it required surgery, and as a result Diggs was named the starter in Week 13. Defensive coordinator Teryl Austin's decision to start Diggs at strong safety was unexpected as many people assumed backup strong safety Miles Killebrew would be taking over the role. On December 3, 2017, Diggs started his first game as a strong safety and collected five solo tackles and a pass deflection during a 44–20 loss at the Baltimore Ravens. In Week 14, he collected seven combined tackles, deflected a pass, and made his first career interception off a pass by quarterback Jameis Winston during a 24–21 victory at the Tampa Bay Buccaneers. The following week, Diggs made his third consecutive start at safety and recorded three solo tackles, two pass deflections, an interception, and a sack in the Lions' 20–10 win against the Chicago Bears in Week 15. He made his first career sack on quarterback Mitchell Trubisky during the second quarter. On December 24, 2017, Diggs recorded four combined tackles, a pass deflection, and intercepted a pass by Andy Dalton in a 26–17 loss at the Cincinnati Bengals in Week 16. His interception extended his streak to three consecutive games with a pick. He finished the 2017 season with a career-high 55 combined tackles (45 solo), nine pass deflections, three interceptions, and a sack in 16 games and 11 starts. PFF gave Diggs an overall grade of 73.5, ranking him 73rd among all qualifying cornerbacks in 2017.

==== 2018 ====
On September 3, 2018, Diggs signed a three-year, $20.4 million contract extension with the Lions.

On September 10, in the season opener on Monday Night Football, Diggs intercepted Sam Darnold's first career pass attempt and returned it 37 yards for a touchdown in a game against the Jets.

For the first season in his career, Diggs was the season long starter. He finished with 78 tackles, three interceptions, one pick-six, and eight passes defended. He also returned 2 punts, one of them for 4 yards, following a late-season injury to Bruce Ellington.

==== 2019 ====
Diggs was the starter and defensive team captain for the Lions through the first 4 games of the season, but left the Week 4 game against the Chiefs in the first half with a hamstring injury that kept him out of the Week 5 game. He returned for Week 6.

On October 22, 2019, Diggs was traded along with a 7th round pick to the Seattle Seahawks for a fifth round pick in the 2020 NFL draft. Detroit used it to draft Jason Huntley who they waived in the offseason.

=== Seattle Seahawks (first stint) ===
==== 2019 ====
Diggs made his debut with the Seahawks in Week 10 against the San Francisco 49ers on Monday Night Football after missing his first two weeks with the team due to his hamstring injury from late September. In the game, Diggs recorded an interception off Jimmy Garoppolo which he returned for 44 yards in the 27–24 overtime win. In Week 12 against the Philadelphia Eagles, Diggs forced a fumble on tight end Dallas Goedert which he recovered in the 17–9 win. In Week 14 against the Rams, he intercepted 2 passes thrown by Jared Goff and returned one for a 55-yard touchdown in the 28–12 loss. The next week he sprained his ankle against Carolina and spent the final two weeks of the season inactive.

He finished the 2019 season with 41 tackles, three interceptions, one pick-six, three passes defended, and one forced fumble. He played in his first career playoff games as the Seahawks advanced to the divisional round.

Diggs was named to the Pro Bowl on January 17, 2020, as an alternate.

==== 2020 ====
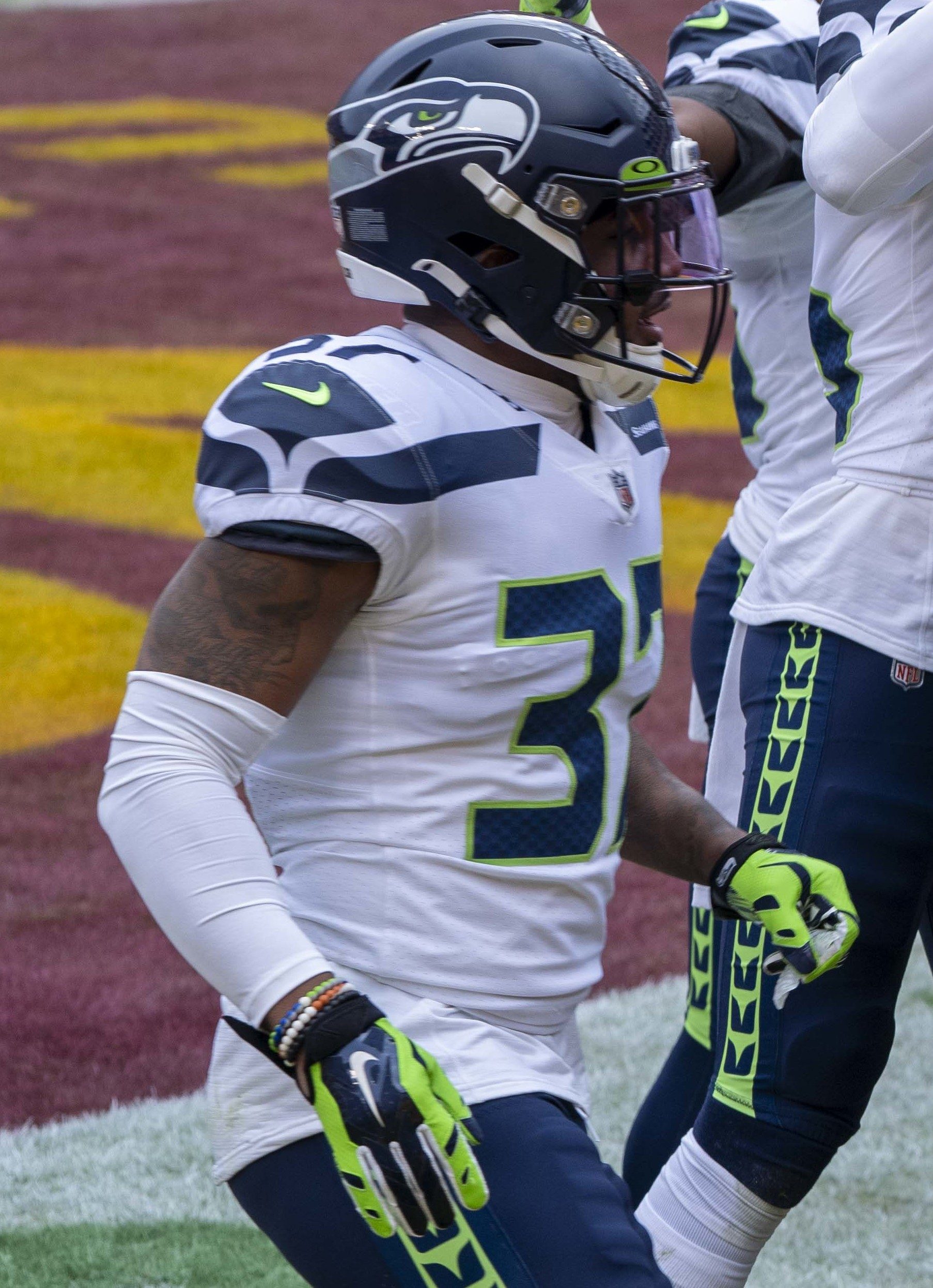
Diggs playing for the Seattle Seahawks in 2020.

2020 marked the first of three Pro Bowl seasons in a row for Diggs. In Week 1 against the Atlanta Falcons, Diggs intercepted a pass thrown by quarterback Matt Ryan late in the fourth quarter to seal a 38–25 Seahawks' win. In Week 2 against the New England Patriots on Sunday Night Football, Diggs was ejected from the game after initiating a helmet to helmet hit with Patriots' wide receiver N'Keal Harry. In Week 7 against the Cardinals on Sunday Night Football, Diggs recorded an interception off a pass thrown by Kyler Murray during the 37–34 overtime loss. In Week 12 against the Eagles on Monday Night Football, Diggs intercepted a pass thrown by Carson Wentz in the end zone during the 23–17 win. In Week 16 against the Rams, Diggs recorded his fifth interception of the season off a pass thrown by Jared Goff during the 20–9 win. He returned to the playoffs with the Seahawks, but they lost the wildcard game to the Rams.

He finished the 2020 season with 64 tackles, five interceptions, and ten passes defended. He was ranked 77th by his fellow players on the NFL Top 100 Players of 2021.

Diggs was named to the Pro Bowl on December 21, 2020, as the National Football Conference (NFC) starter at free safety. Diggs and teammate Jamal Adams became the first safety tandem to make the Pro Bowl together since former Seahawks safeties Earl Thomas and Kam Chancellor in 2015.

==== 2021 ====
On May 17, 2021, Diggs has announced that he would change his number 37 to number 6, per the new NFL jersey rule.

At the start of the season he refused to practice with the team until he got a new contract and Seattle agreed to restructure it a few days later.

In Week 18 of the 2021 season, Diggs suffered a dislocated ankle and a broken right fibula in the 38–30 win against the Cardinals.

He had 94 tackles, five interceptions, and seven passes defended. He was ranked 72nd by his fellow players on the NFL Top 100 Players of 2022 and was named to the Pro-Bowl again, though he did not play due to his injuries in Week 18. He was also was named 1st Team All-NFC by the Pro Football Writers.

==== 2022 ====
On March 14, 2022, Diggs signed a three-year, $40 million extension with the Seahawks.

In Week 18, Diggs had four tackles and an overtime interception that led to a game-winning field goal in a 19–16 win over the Rams, earning NFC Defensive Player of the Week.

He recorded 7 interceptions with 70 yards in returns, 7 pass deflection, a forced fumble, 71 tackles and a tackle for a loss and earned Pro Bowl honors for the third season in a row. In the 2022 season, Diggs had 71 tackles, four interceptions, and seven passes defended.

==== 2023 ====
Diggs played all 17 games for the Seahawks, recording one interception with a 21 yard return, five passes defended and 95 tackles and serving as team captain. In the Seahawks wild card playoff game, he recorded 5 tackles as they lost to the 49ers.

On March 5, 2024, Diggs was released by the Seahawks.

=== Tennessee Titans ===
==== 2024 ====
On August 6, 2024, Diggs signed with the Tennessee Titans after being cleared to play.

He made 8 starts for the Titans before suffering a Lisfranc fracture that caused him to miss the rest of the season.. He managed to log 42 combined tackles in his shortened season.

==== 2025 ====
On August 5, 2025, Diggs re-signed with the Titans after initially entering free agency. He made nine appearances (four starts) for the team, recording one pass deflection and 30 combined tackles. On November 7, Diggs requested and was granted his release by the Titans.

=== Seattle Seahawks (second stint) ===
On November 26, 2025, Diggs was signed to the Seattle Seahawks' practice squad after Ty Okada suffered an oblique injury against Tennessee. He was elevated for one game in week 12, playing just 4 special teams snaps.

He won his first Super Bowl as part of the Seahawks team that won Super Bowl LX, but he never made the roster during the playoffs. His contract with the Seahawks expired on February 17, 2026.

== NFL career statistics ==
Legend
	Won the Super Bowl
**Bold**	Career High

=== Regular season ===
Year	Team	Games		Tackles				Interceptions						Fumbles	
Year	Team	GP	GS	Cmb	Solo	Ast	Sck	PD	Int	Yds	Avg	Lng	TD	FF	FR
2015	DET	16	4	38	31	7	0.0	6	0	0	0.0	0	0	**1**	**1**
2016	DET	12	4	44	40	4	0.0	1	0	0	0.0	0	0	**1**	0
2017	DET	16	11	55	45	10	**1.0**	9	3	28	9.3	16	0	**1**	0
2018	DET	16	16	78	64	14	0.0	8	3	41	13.7	37	**1**	0	0
2019	DET	5	5	20	17	3	0.0	0	0	0	0.0	0	0	0	0
2019	SEA	5	5	21	10	11	0.0	3	3	**99**	**33.0**	**55**	**1**	**1**	**1**
2020	SEA	16	16	64	42	22	0.0	**10**	**5**	57	11.4	32	0	0	0
2021	SEA	17	17	94	**66**	28	0.0	7	**5**	68	13.6	29	0	0	0
2022	SEA	17	17	71	50	21	0.0	7	4	70	17.5	27	0	**1**	0
2023	SEA	17	17	**95**	63	**32**	0.0	5	1	21	21.0	21	0	0	0
2024	TEN	8	8	42	35	7	0.0	0	0	0	0.0	0	0	0	0
2025	TEN	9	4	30	17	13	0.0	1	0	0	0.0	0	0	0	0
2025	SEA	1	0	0	0	0	0.0	0	0	0	0.0	0	0	0	0
Career		155	124	652	480	172	1.0	57	24	384	16.0	55	2	5	2

=== Postseason ===
Year	Team	Games		Tackles				Interceptions						Fumbles	
Year	Team	GP	GS	Cmb	Solo	Ast	Sck	PD	Int	Yds	Avg	Lng	TD	FF	FR
2019	SEA	**2**	**2**	**8**	**6**	**2**	0.0	0	0	0	0.0	0	0	0	0
2020	SEA	1	1	5	4	1	0.0	0	0	0	0.0	0	0	0	0
2022	SEA	1	1	5	3	**2**	0.0	0	0	0	0.0	0	0	0	0
Career		4	4	18	13	5	0.0	0	0	0	0.0	0	0	0	0

== Personal life ==
As of 2023, Diggs and his wife have two children, a son and a daughter.

Diggs has several family members who also played pro football. He is the younger half-brother of former University of Texas Longhorns cornerback Quentin Jammer. His cousin Cam Ward is an NFL quarterback selected by the Titans with the first overall pick of the 2025 NFL draft and another cousin Cedric Woodard played six seasons in the NFL.
