= Brian Picucci =

American football coach (born 1971)

Jacksonville Jaguars
- Title: Run game coordinator

Personal information
- Born: February 2, 1971 (age 55); Leominster, Massachusetts, U.S.

Career information
- Position: Tight end
- College: Syracuse (1989–1993)

Career history
- Southern Connecticut State (1994–1997) Graduate assistant, offensive tackles coach & tight ends coach; UMass (1998–1999) Assistant offensive line & interior defensive line coach; Northeastern (2000–2003) Run game coordinator & offensive line coach; UMass (2004–2012) Run game coordinator, offensive line coach & offensive coordinator; Central Connecticut State (2013) Offensive line coach & interim head coach; Widener (2014) Offensive coordinator & offensive line coach; Becker College (2015) Offensive coordinator; Maine (2016–2017) Running backs coach, offensive coordinator & quarterbacks coach; Detroit Lions (2018–2019) Offensive assistant & assistant tight ends coach; FIU (2021) Wide receivers coach; NFL Alumni Academy (2022) Offensive coordinator & tight ends coach; Kentucky (2023) Offensive quality control coach; Tampa Bay Buccaneers (2024–2025) Assistant offensive line & offensive line coach; Jacksonville Jaguars (2026–present) Run game coordinator

Awards and highlights
- 1 NCAA Division I-AA (1998); 3 A-10 (1998–1999, 2003); 1 MAC (D-III) (2014)

Brian Picucci (born February 2, 1971) is an American football coach and former fullback and tight end who currently serves as the run game coordinator for the Jacksonville Jaguars of the National Football League (NFL). He previously served as an offensive line coach for the Tampa Bay Buccaneers from 2024 to 2025, and coached for the Detroit Lions from 2018 to 2019.

== Coaching career ==
Picucci began his coaching career at Southern Connecticut State in 1994, serving as the offensive tackles and tight ends coach through 1997. In 1998, he joined the staff at UMass, where he assisted with the offensive line during their I-AA National Championship season before coaching the interior defensive line in 1999. He then spent four seasons at Northeastern 2000–2003 as the run game coordinator and offensive line coach, helping the program to its first Atlantic-10 Championship in 2002.

In 2004, Picucci returned to UMass. Serving as the run game coordinator, offensive line coach, and eventually being promoted to offensive coordinator, he coached future Jacksonville Jaguars head coach Liam Coen, who was then a record-breaking quarterback for the Minutemen. Following his time at UMass, Picucci served as an offensive line coach before serving as the interim head coach at Central Connecticut State in 2013 following the resignation of head coach Jeff McInerney. He later held offensive coordinator roles at Widener University in 2014 and Becker College in 2015 before joining Maine from 2016 to 2017, where he served as running backs coach and offensive coordinator.

Picucci made the jump to the NFL with the Detroit Lions from 2018 to 2019 as an offensive assistant and assistant tight ends coach under former head coach Matt Patricia. After a stint at FIU 2021 and the NFL Alumni Academy 2022, he reunited with Coen at Kentucky in 2023 as an offensive quality control coach. In 2024, Picucci followed Coen to the Tampa Bay Buccaneers, serving as the assistant offensive line coach before his promotion to offensive line coach for the 2025 season.

On January 25, 2026, Picucci once again joined Coen's staff, being named the run game coordinator for the Jacksonville Jaguars.

== Personal life ==
He played college football for the Syracuse Orange from 1989 to 1993 who were bowl victorious in each year. He graduated with a bachelor's degree in education in 1994.
