= Darius Slay =

American football player (born 1991)

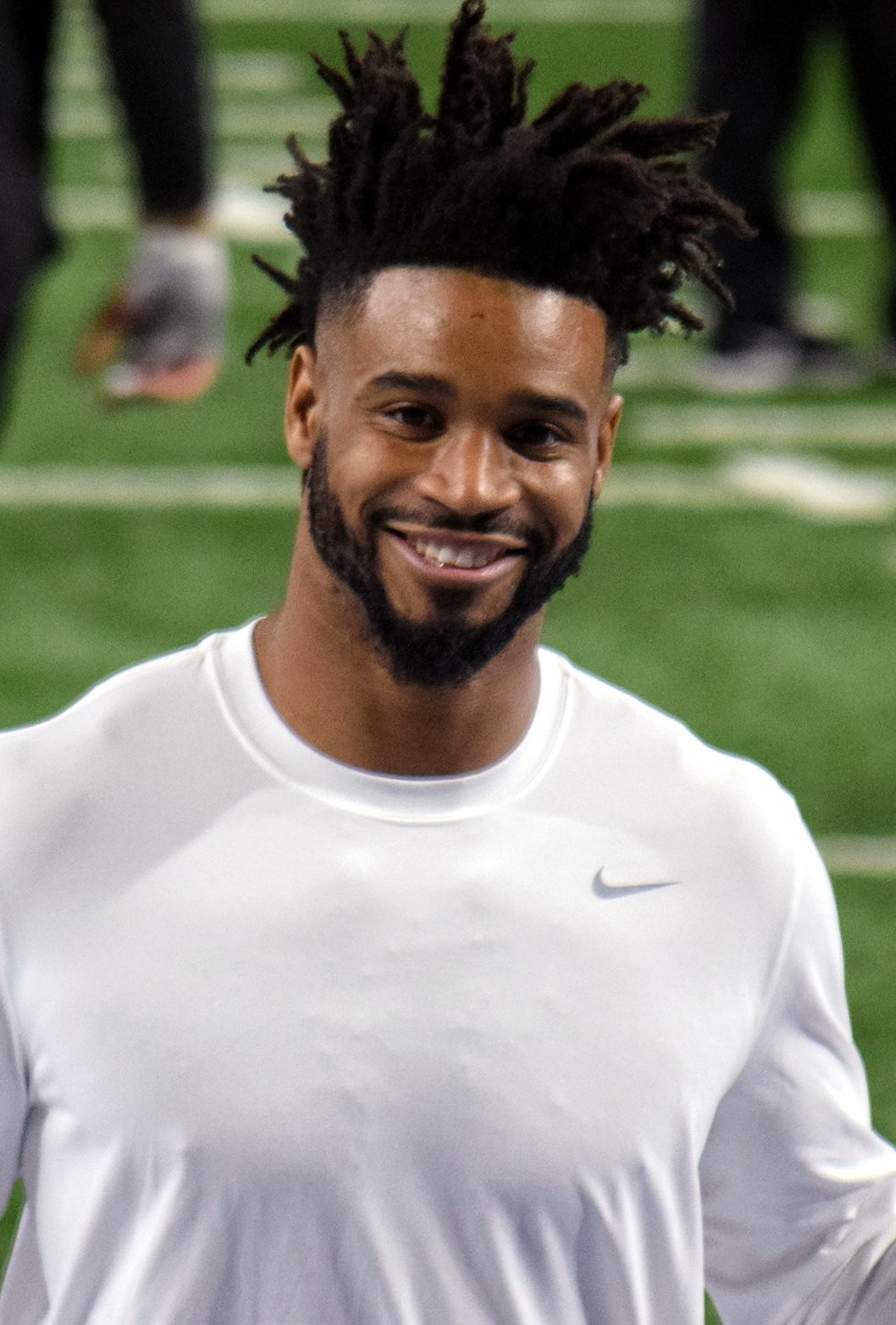
- Slay in 2017

No. 30, 23, 24, 2
- Position: Cornerback

Personal information
- Born: January 1, 1991 (age 35); Brunswick, Georgia, U.S.
- Listed height: 6 ft 0 in (1.83 m)
- Listed weight: 192 lb (87 kg)

Career information
- High school: Brunswick
- College: Itawamba (2009–2010); Mississippi State (2011–2012)
- NFL draft: 2013: 2nd round, 36th overall pick

Career history
- Detroit Lions (2013–2019); Philadelphia Eagles (2020–2024); Pittsburgh Steelers (2025)

Awards and highlights
- Super Bowl champion (LIX); First-team All-Pro (2017); 6× Pro Bowl (2017–2019, 2021–2023); NFL interceptions co-leader (2017); Second-team All-SEC (2012)

Career NFL statistics
- Total tackles: 655
- Forced fumbles: 2
- Fumble recoveries: 6
- Pass deflections: 163
- Interceptions: 28
- Defensive touchdowns: 5
- Stats at Pro Football Reference

Darius Demetrius Slay Jr. (born January 1, 1991) is an American former professional football player who was a cornerback for 13 seasons in the National Football League (NFL). He played college football for the Itawamba Indians before transferring to the Mississippi State Bulldogs. He was selected by the Detroit Lions in the second round of the 2013 NFL draft. Nicknamed "Big Play Slay", Slay won Super Bowl LIX with the Philadelphia Eagles in the 2024 season. He also played one season for the Pittsburgh Steelers.

== Early life ==
Darius Slay Jr. was born in Brunswick, Georgia on January 1, 1991, to Stephanie Lowe and Darius Slay Sr., who were just 13 and 14 years old, respectively. Slay attended Brunswick High School, where he was a running back and defensive back. He was named All-State by The Atlanta Journal-Constitution at defensive back following his senior season, and was also chosen for the Georgia North-South All-Star Game. He rushed for over 1,300 yards and 15 touchdowns in the 2008 season, and intercepted six passes with two touchdown returns. His junior season was shortened by a torn medial collateral ligament after he had rushed for 336 yards and six touchdowns in five games. As a sophomore, he put up 1,127 yards on 142 rushes with 13 touchdowns. Slay also lettered in basketball and was a standout track and field athlete. He was timed at 10.92 seconds in the 100 meters and 22 seconds in the 200 meters.

== College career ==
Slay attended Itawamba Community College before transferring to Mississippi State University.

As a freshman at ICC, Slay earned First-team Mississippi Association of Community and Junior Colleges (MACJC) All-State and National Junior College Athletic Association (NJCAA) All-Region 23 honors after record 41 tackles, 3 tackles for loss, 1 sack and forced two fumbles after only playing five games for Coach Jon Williams and the Indians. After his freshman season, he earned JC Gridwire Preseason Second-team All-American honors. During his final season in Fulton, Slay played in all nine games, recorded 32 total tackles, 1 tackle for loss, one forced fumble and one fumble recovery, and had three catches for 63 yards and a touchdown. He earned MACJC First-team All-State honors on defense and special teams.

After ICC, he played for head coach Dan Mullen's Mississippi State Bulldogs football team in 2011 and 2012. In his two seasons for Mississippi State, he had 64 tackles, six interceptions, and two touchdowns.

== Professional career ==
=== Pre-draft ===
Coming out of Mississippi State, Slay was projected to be a second- or third-round draft pick by the majority of NFL draft experts and scouts. He received an invitation to the NFL Combine and completed all of the required combine and positional drills. On March 6, 2013, Slay participated at Mississippi State's pro day in front of team representatives and scouts from 30 NFL teams. He was ranked as the seventh-best cornerback prospect available in the draft by NFL analyst Mike Mayock and was ranked the eighth-best cornerback by NFLDraftScout.com.

External videos
- Darius Slay's NFL Combine Workout
- Darius Slay's 40-yard dash

Pre-draft measurables
Height	Weight	Arm length	Hand span	Wingspan	40-yard dash	10-yard split	20-yard split	20-yard shuttle	Three-cone drill	Vertical jump	Broad jump	Bench press
5 ft 11 7/8 in (1.83 m)	192 lb (87 kg)	32 1/4 in (0.82 m)	9 3/8 in (0.24 m)	6 ft 3 5/8 in (1.92 m)	4.36 s	1.54 s	2.56 s	4.21 s	6.90 s	35.5 in (0.90 m)	10 ft 4 in (3.15 m)	14 reps
All values from NFL Combine

=== Detroit Lions ===
==== 2013 ====
The Detroit Lions selected Slay in the second round (36th overall) of the 2013 NFL draft. He was the fifth cornerback selected, behind Dee Milliner, D. J. Hayden, Desmond Trufant, and Xavier Rhodes, and also became the first of two cornerbacks selected in 2013 from Mississippi State, along with second-round pick (42nd overall) Johnthan Banks. In addition, he surpassed former 2001 second-round pick (45th overall) Fred Smoot to become the second-highest drafted cornerback from Mississippi State, behind 1996 first-round pick (13th overall) Walt Harris.

External videos
- Detroit Lions select Darius Slay No. 36
- Darius Slay's 2013 NFL Draft Interview

On May 3, 2013, Slay underwent arthroscopic surgery to repair a torn meniscus in his right knee. On May 13, 2013, the Detroit Lions signed Slay to a four–year, $5.28 million contract that included $3.12 million guaranteed and a signing bonus of $2.22 million.

He competed with Chris Houston and Bill Bentley throughout training camp in 2013 for the starting cornerback role. Head coach Jim Schwartz named Slay the starting cornerback to begin his rookie season.

He earned his first start in his professional regular season debut during the 2013 season opener against the Minnesota Vikings and recorded four solo tackles and a pass deflection as the Lions won 34–24. After giving up a big play, he was benched in favor for veteran Rashean Mathis in the fourth quarter. Slay started the following week, but after struggling he was demoted in favor of Mathis and only appeared on special teams during the Lions' Week 3 victory over the Washington Redskins. On September 29, 2013, Slay had a season-high seven combined tackles and a pass defense in a 40–32 victory over the Chicago Bears. On December 7, 2013, it was confirmed that Slay had suffered a torn meniscus during practice. The injury happened during a non-contact drill and was described as a "freak" accident by head coach Jim Schwartz. It caused him to miss the following three games (Weeks 14–16). On December 31, 2013, the Detroit Lions fired head coach Jim Schwartz after they failed to qualify for the playoffs and finished with a 7–9 record in 2013. He finished his rookie season in 2013 with 34 combined tackles (27 solo) and six passes defended in 13 games with four starts.

==== 2014 ====
He entered training camp expecting to compete against Chris Houston to earn the role as the No. 1 starting cornerback, but became the expected starter after Chris Houston was unable to participate in training camp after undergoing a surgery on his toe in the spring. On June 14, 2014, the Detroit Lions officially released Chris Houston, citing his request to personally handle his recovery away from the team facility. Head coach Jim Caldwell named Slay and Rashean Mathis the starting cornerbacks to begin the regular season. Due to the departure of Chris Houston, Slay chose to change his jersey number from No. 30, which he wore as a rookie, to No. 23, that was previously held by Houston.

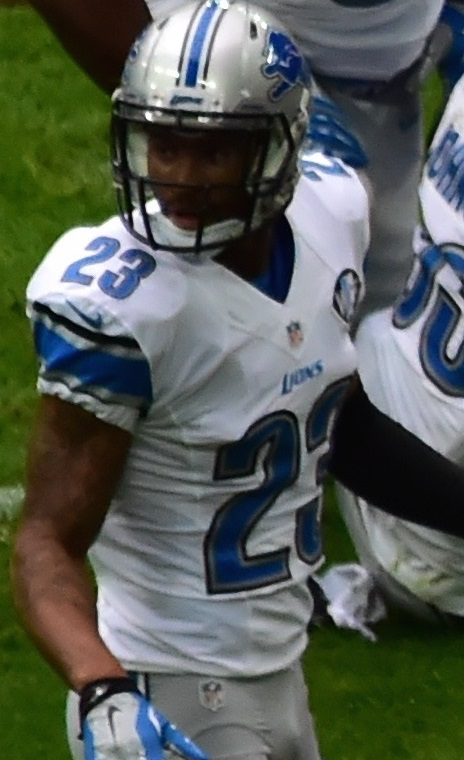
Slay in 2014

He started the season-opener against the New York Giants and recorded three solo tackles and a season-high three pass deflections in a 35–14 victory. On September 28, 2014, Slay recorded five combined tackles, deflected a pass, and made his first career interception during a 24–17 victory at the New York Jets in Week 4. Slay made his first career interception off a pass by quarterback Geno Smith, that was originally intended for wide receiver Eric Decker, and returned it for a 40-yard gain in the fourth quarter. In Week 13, he collected a season-high eight combined tackles and had a season-high three pass deflections in the Lions' 34–17 win against the Bears. On December 14, 2014, Slay recorded five combined tackles, deflected two passes, and made an interception during the Lions' 16–14 win against the Vikings in Week 15. Slay intercepted a pass by Vikings' quarterback Teddy Bridgewater, that was intended for wide receiver Greg Jennings, in the second quarter. He started in all 16 games in 2014 and recorded a career-high 61 combined tackles (48 solo), 17 pass deflections, and two interceptions.

The Detroit Lions finished the 2014 NFL season second in the NFC North with an 11–5 record and qualified for a playoff berth. On January 4, 2015, Slay started his first career playoff game and made one solo tackle and broke up a pass as the Lions lost the NFC Wildcard Game 24–20 at the Dallas Cowboys.

==== 2015 ====
He entered training camp slated as the de facto No. 1 starting cornerback. Head coach Jim Caldwell retained Slay and Rashean Mathis as the starting cornerback duo to start the season. On September 13, 2015, Slay started in the Detroit Lions' season-opener at the San Diego Chargers and made five combined tackles (three solo), a pass deflection, and intercepted a pass by Philip Rivers to wide receiver Malcolm Floyd during a 28–33 loss. In Week 6, he recorded six solo tackles and set a new season-high with four pass deflections during a 37–34 overtime victory against the Chicago Bears. On December 13, 2015, Slay recorded two solo tackles, made a pass deflection, and intercepted a pass by Case Keenum thrown to wide receiver Kenny Britt during a 14–21 loss at the St. Louis Rams. In Week 15, Slay set a season-high with seven combined tackles (five solo) and made two pass deflections, as the Lions defeated the New Orleans Saints 35–27. He started all 16 games in 2015 and recorded 59 combined tackles (48 solo), 13 pass deflections, and two interceptions.

==== 2016 ====
On July 29, 2016, the Detroit Lions signed Slay to a four–year, $48.15 million contract extension with $23.1 million guaranteed and a signing bonus of $14.5 million. The extension placed Slay under contract from 2016–2020. He entered training camp as the No. 1 cornerback on the Lions depth chart after the Lions opted to not re-sign Rashean Mathis. Head coach Jim Caldwell named Slay and Nevin Lawson the starting cornerbacks to begin the season.

On October 2, 2016, Slay recorded four solo tackles, set a season-high with three pass deflections, and made his first and so far only career sack on Brian Hoyer for a seven–yard loss during a 17–14 loss at the Chicago Bears. On October 9, 2016, Slay made three solo tackles, two pass deflections, and sealed a 24–23 victory against the Philadelphia Eagles by intercepting a pass by Carson Wentz to wide receiver Nelson Agholor with 1:28 remaining after forcing a fumble on Ryan Mathews. In Week 7, Slay recorded two solo tackles before exiting in he second quarter of a 20–17 victory against the Washington Redskins due to a hamstring injury. He subsequently remained inactive for the next two games (Weeks 8–9) due to his injured hamstring. In Week 12, Slay made four solo tackles, one pass deflection, and sealed the Lions' 16–13 victory against the Minnesota Vikings by intercepting a pass by Sam Bradford thrown to wide receiver Adam Thielen with only 38 seconds remaining in the game. He was inactive for as the Lions lost 21–42 at the Dallas Cowboys in Week 16 due to a hamstring injury he suffered the previous week. In Week 17, Slay set a season-high with eight solo tackles during a 31–24 loss to the Green Bay Packers. He finished the 2016 season with 44 combined tackles (43 solo), 13 passes defensed, two interceptions, a sack, and a forced fumble in 13 games and 13 starts.

==== 2017 ====
Head coach Jim Caldwell retained Slay as the No. 1 starting cornerback to begin the season, starting him alongside Nevin Lawson and nickelback Quandre Diggs. On September 18, 2017, Slay set a season-high with eight combined tackles (six solo) and made two pass deflections during a 24–10 win against the New York Giants. In Week 3, Slay recorded five solo tackles, set a season-high with three pass deflections, and set a season-high with two interceptions on passes thrown by Matt Ryan during a 30–26 loss to the Atlanta Falcons. This was Slay's first multi-interception performance of his career. In Week 6, he made three solo tackles, one pass deflection, and set a new career-high with his third interception of the season on a pass by Drew Brees to wide receiver Michael Thomas as the Lions lost 39–52 at the New Orleans Saints. On November 12, 2017, Slay made five solo tackles, three pass deflections, and sealed a 38–24 victory against the Cleveland Browns by intercepting a pass by DeShone Kizer to wide receiver Ricardo Louis with only 1:23 remaining in the game. On December 16, 2017, Slay made five solo tackles, three pass deflections, and tied his season-high with two interceptions on passes thrown by Mitchell Trubisky during a 20–10 win against the Chicago Bears. His performance earned him NFC Defensive Player of the Week honors. In Week 17, he recorded five solo tackles, tied his season-high of three pass deflections, and sealed a 35–11 victory against the Green Bay Packers by picking off a pass thrown by Brett Hundley to wide receiver Geronimo Allison late in the fourth quarter. He started in all 16 games throughout the 2017 NFL season and recorded a total of 60 combined tackles (54 solo), a career-high 26 pass deflections, and eight interceptions. He led the league in interceptions (8) and pass deflections (26) in 2017. He was voted to the 2018 Pro Bowl, marking his first Pro Bowl selection of his career and was also selected first-team All-Pro. He received an overall grade of 80.6 from Pro Football Focus, which ranked 16th among all qualifying cornerbacks in 2017. He was ranked 49th by his peers on the NFL Top 100 Players of 2018.

==== 2018 ====
On January 1, 2018, the Detroit Lions fired head coach Jim Caldwell after they finished the 2017 NFL season with a 9–7 record. On February 5, 2018, the Lions announced their decision to hire New England Patriots' defensive coordinator Matt Patricia as their new head coach. Defensive coordinator Paul Pasqualoni chose to retain Slay and Nevin Lawson as the starting cornerbacks to begin the season.

On October 7, 2018, he set a season-high with five solo tackles as the Lions defeated the Green Bay Packers 31–23. He was inactive for the Lions' 22–34 loss at the Chicago Bears in Week 10 due to a knee injury. On December 9, 2018, Slay made three combined tackles (two solo), three pass deflections, and had his first career pick-six after he intercepted a pass by Josh Rosen to wide receiver Trent Sherfield and returned it for 67–yards to score his first career touchdown during a 17–3 win against the Arizona Cardinals. His performance in Week 14 earned him NFC Defensive Player of the Week. He finished the 2018 NFL season with a total of 43 combined tackles (40 solo), 17 pass deflections, three interceptions, and a touchdown in 15 games and 15 starts. He was named to the 2019 Pro Bowl which became his second consecutive Pro Bowl selection. He was ranked 86th by his fellow players on the NFL Top 100 Players of 2019.

==== 2019 ====
He returned to training camp slated as the de facto No. 1 starting cornerback. Head coach Matt Patricia named him the No. 1 starting cornerback to begin the season, alongside Rashaan Melvin and starting nickelback Justin Coleman.

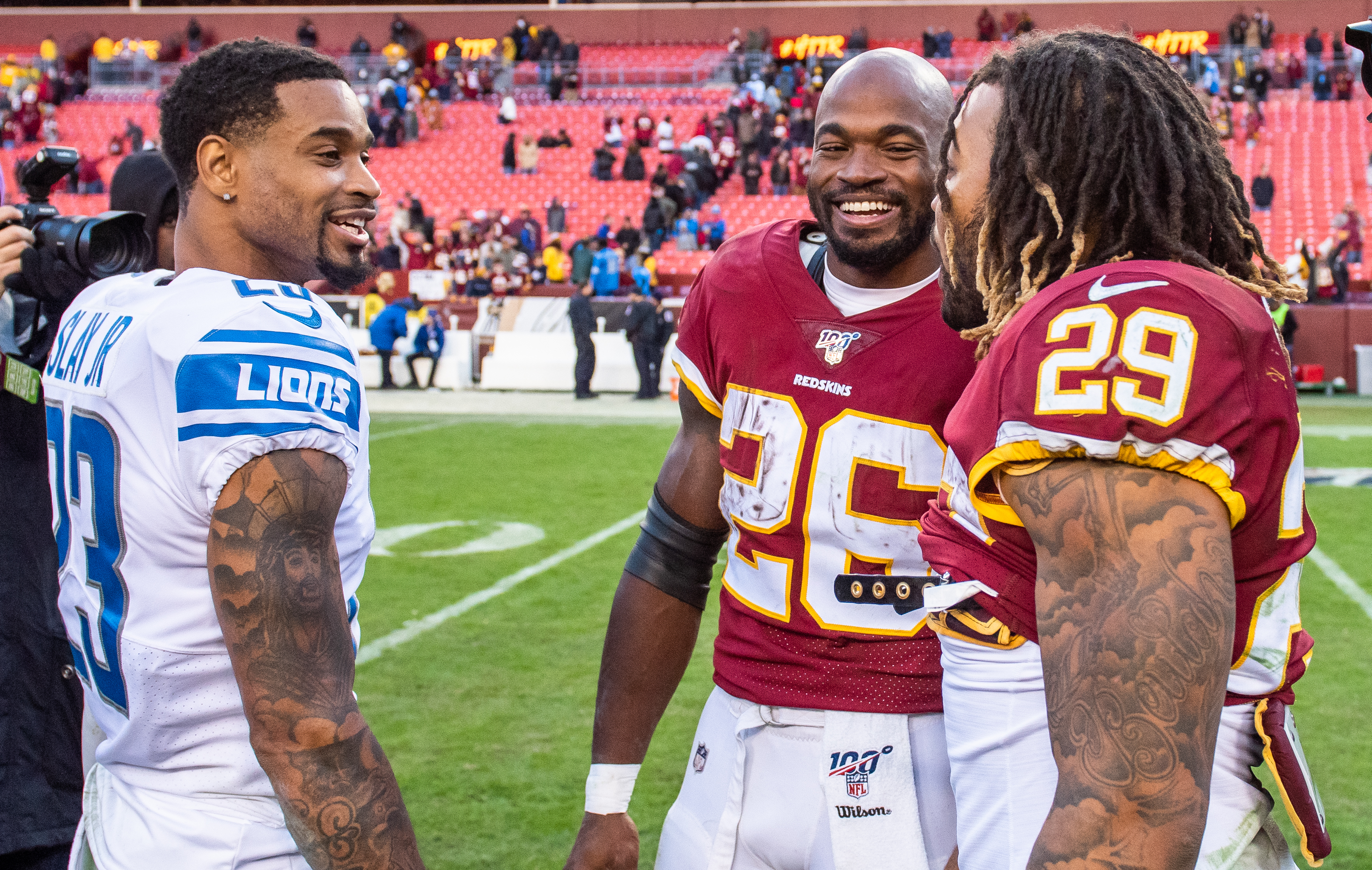
Slay, with Adrian Peterson and Derrius Guice, following a victory over the Washington Redskins in November 2019

On September 15, 2019, Slay set a season-high with six solo tackles (five combined), made two pass deflections, and secured the Lions' 13–10 win against the Los Angeles Chargers by intercepting a pass by Philip Rivers to wide receiver Keenan Allen with 1:10 remaining. He was inactive for the Lions' 30–34 loss to the Kansas City Chiefs in Week 4 and as the Lions defeated the New York Giants 31–26 in Week 8 due to a re-occurring hamstring injury. In Week 11, he recorded three solo tackles and set a season-high with three pass deflections during a 27–35 loss against the Dallas Cowboys. He finished the 2019 NFL season with a total of 46 combined tackles (36 solo), 13 pass deflections, two interceptions, and one fumble recovery in 14 games and 14 starts. He was voted to his third Pro Bowl in 2019. After the season ended, Slay acknowledged that he had lost respect for head coach Matt Patricia for telling him he did not consider him "an elite corner" while they were in a one-on-one meeting. He was ranked 92nd by his fellow players on the NFL Top 100 Players of 2020.

=== Philadelphia Eagles ===
==== 2020 ====
On March 20, 2020, the Philadelphia Eagles traded a third-round (85th overall) and a fifth-round (166th overall) selection in the 2020 NFL draft to the Detroit Lions in return for Slay. With only one season remaining on his contract, Slay stipulated he would only allow the trade if the Eagles signed him to a contract extension immediately. In accordance with his request, the Eagles signed him to a three–year, $42.00 million contract extension that included $24.50 million guaranteed and an initial signing bonus of $10.18 million. The contract has a maximum worth of $50 million after including incentives, with the contract adding three seasons, and kept him under contract throughout the 2023.

Upon signing, Slay announced he'd now wear jersey No. 24, as a tribute to Lakers legend Kobe Bryant, due to his previous number, No. 23, being already assigned to Rodney McLeod. He was reunited with Eagles' defensive coordinator Jim Schwartz, who was his head coach with the Lions in 2013. He entered training camp slated as the de facto No. 1 starting cornerback following the departures of Rasul Douglas and Ronald Darby. Head coach Doug Pederson named him the No. 1 starting cornerback to begin the season, pairing him with Avonte Maddox.

On September 13, 2020, Slay made his regular season debut with the Eagles in their season-opener at Washington and recorded three combined tackles (two solo) in their 17–27 loss. In Week 12, he set a season-high with nine combined tackles (eight solo) as the Eagles lost 17–23 against the Seattle Seahawks. He was inactive for the Eagles' 26–33 loss at the Arizona Cardinals in Week 15 due to a knee injury. On December 27, 2020, Slay recorded two solo tackles, made one pass deflection, and had his first interception as a member of the Eagles after picking off a pass by Andy Dalton to wide receiver CeeDee Lamb during a 37–17 loss at the Dallas Cowboys. He finished the 2020 NFL season with a total of 59 combined tackles (53 solo), made six pass deflections, and had one interception in 15 games and 15 starts. He received an overall grade of 62.9 from Pro Football Focus in 2020.

==== 2021 ====
On January 24, 2021, the Philadelphia Eagles hired Nick Sirianni to be their new head coach after they fired Doug Pederson following a 4–11–1 record in 2020. On May 1, 2021, Slay announced that he would change his number from No. 24 to No. 2 following the change in the rules for NFL jersey numbers. No. 2 became available for Slay after Jalen Hurts vacated it and chose No. 1, which finally became available following the departure of punter Cameron Johnston. Defensive coordinator Jonathan Gannon retained Slay as the No. 1 starting cornerback and paired him with Steven Nelson.

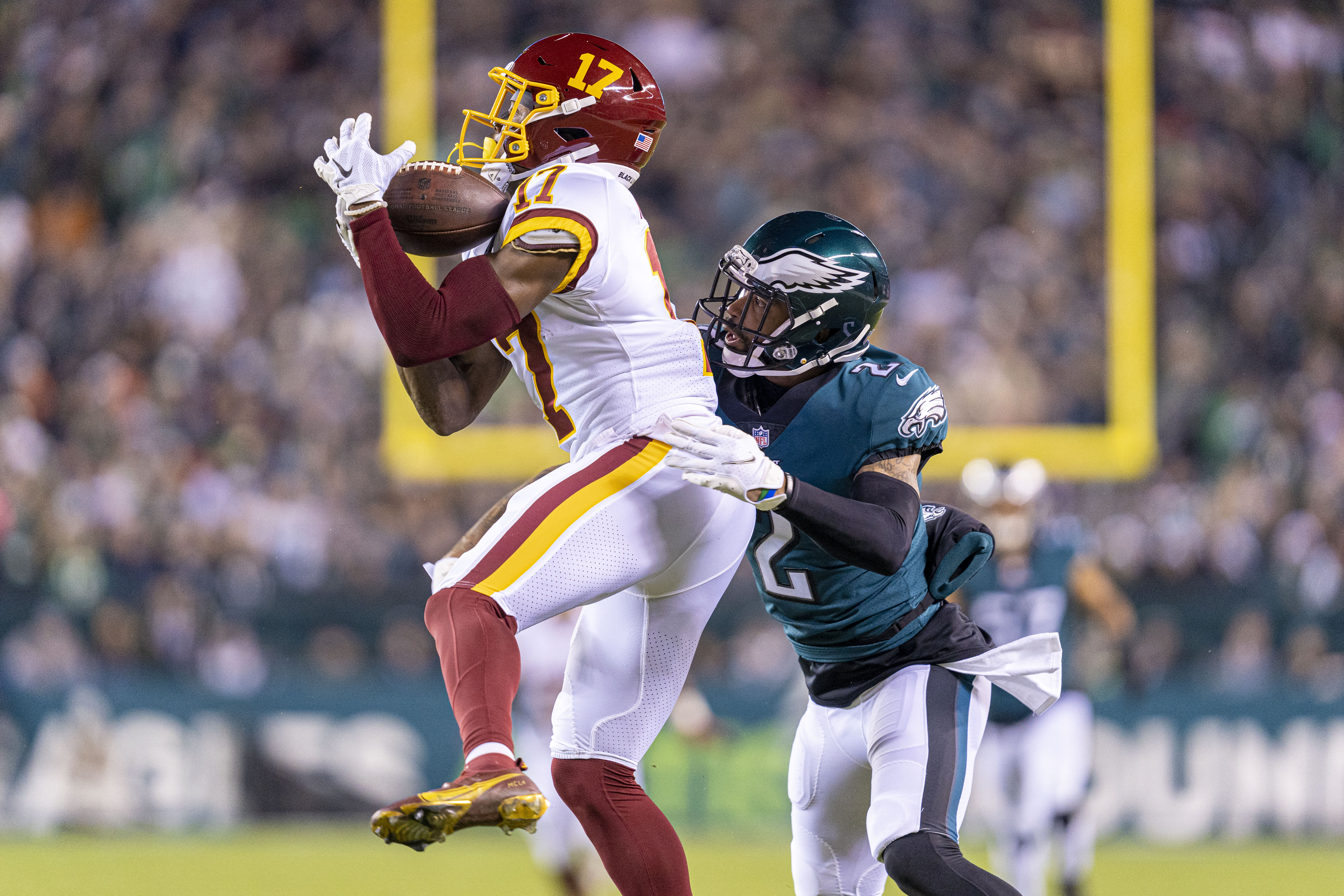
Slay covering Washington Football Team wide receiver, Terry McLaurin, in 2021.

On September 12, 2021, Slay started in the Eagles' season-opener at the Atlanta Falcons and set a season-high with six combined tackles (three solo) and made one pass deflection during a 32–6 victory. In Week 5, Slay recorded three solo tackles, made two pass deflections, and set a season-high with two interceptions on passes thrown by Sam Darnold during a 21–18 win at the Carolina Panthers. In Week 8, he made one solo tackle and returned a fumble recovery after Avonte Maddox forced the fumble while tackling D'Andre Swift on an eight–yard run and returned it 33 yards for a touchdown during a 44–6 win at his former home stadium at the Detroit Lions. This was the first time Slay had scored a touchdown on a fumble recovery during his career. In Week 10, he recorded five combined tackles (three solo) and recovered a fumble that linebacker Davion Taylor forced by running back Melvin Gordon and returned it 83–yards to score a touchdown during a 30–13 victory at the Denver Broncos. His Week 10 performance earned him NFC Defensive Player of the Week. On November 23, 2021, he made one solo tackle, two pass deflections, and had a pick-six on an interception thrown by Trevor Siemian to wide receiver Deonte Harty and returned it 51–yards to score his third touchdown of the season as the Eagles defeated the New Orleans Saints 40–29. His three defensive touchdowns in 2021, were the second most defensive touchdowns scored in a single season in Eagles' franchise history, finishing only behind cornerback Eric Allen, who scored four touchdowns in 1993. In Week 18, Slay was one of ten starting players inactive as a healthy scratch, in order to rest ahead of the playoffs, as the Eagles lost 26–51 to the Dallas Cowboys. He finished the season with a total of 52 combined tackles (40 solo), made three interceptions, and set a career-high, while leading the league, with three defensive touchdowns in 2021 and was selected to his fourth Pro Bowl; his first as an Eagle. He was ranked 77th by his fellow players on the NFL Top 100 Players of 2022. Pro Football Focus had Slay finish the season with an overall grade of 81.0 in 2021.

==== 2022 ====
He entered the season as the Eagles' No. 1 starting cornerback and was paired with James Bradberry, following the release of Steven Nelson. On September 19, 2022, Slay recorded one solo tackle, set a career-high with five pass deflections, and also set a season-high with two interceptions on pass attempts by Kirk Cousins during a 24–7 win over the Minnesota Vikings. His Week 2 performance earned him the NFC Defensive Player of the Week. In Week 5, he set a new season-high with nine combined tackles (seven solo) during a 20–17 victory at the Arizona Cardinals. He started all 16 games throughout the 2022 NFL season and recorded a total of 55 combined tackles (40 solo), 14 pass deflections, and three interceptions. He was ranked 65th by his fellow players on the NFL Top 100 Players of 2023. He received an overall grade of 73.1 from Pro Football Focus in 2022.

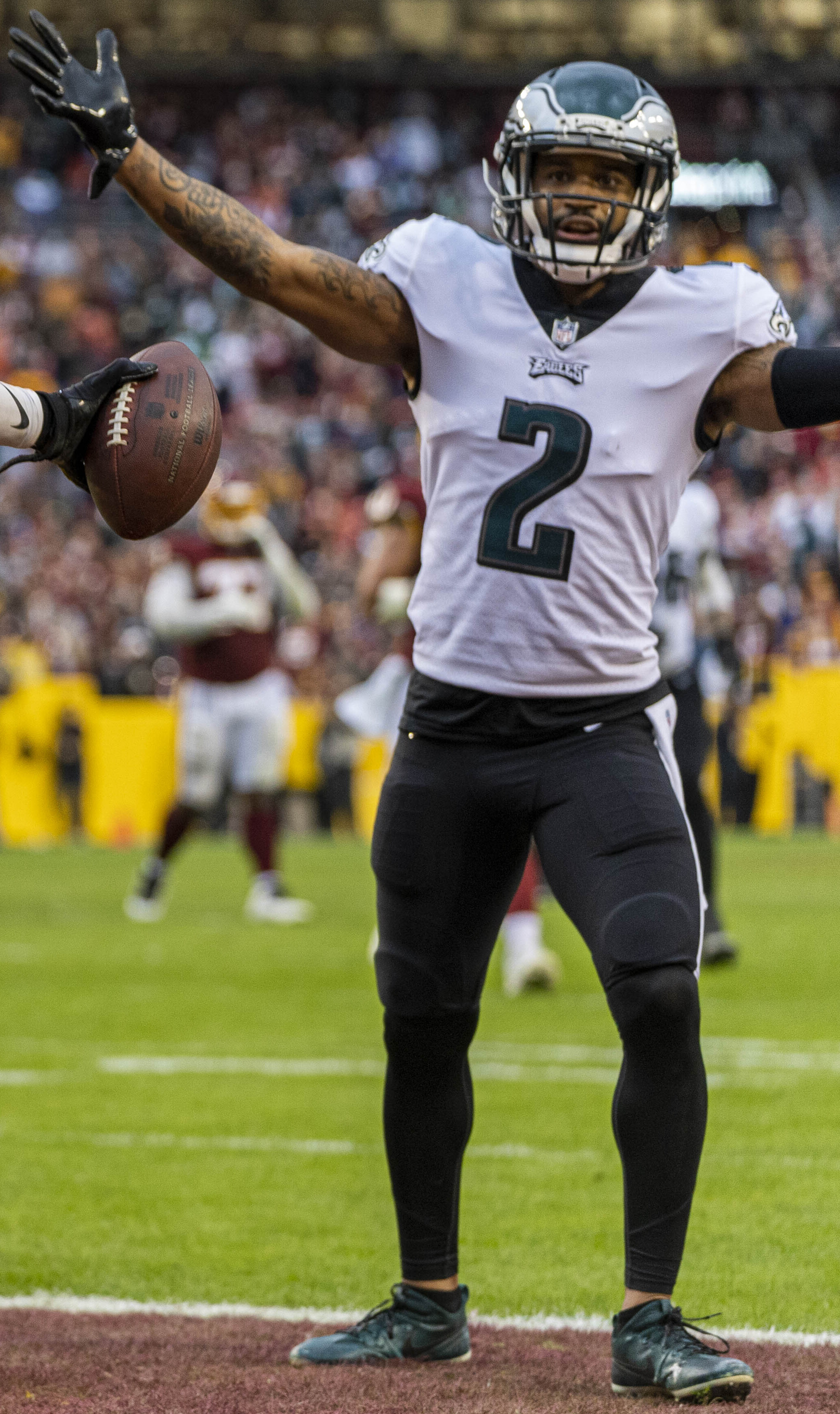
Slay celebrates an interception in 2022

The Philadelphia Eagles finished first in the NFC East in 2022 with a 14–3 record to earn a first-round bye. On January 21, 2023, recorded five combined tackles (four solo) and broke up a pass during a 38–7 victory against the New York Giants in the Divisional Round. The Eagles advanced to the Super Bowl after defeating the San Francisco 49ers 31–7 in the NFC Championship Game. On February 12, 2023, Slay started in Super Bowl LVII and made four solo tackles, but the Eagles would lose 38–35 to the Kansas City Chiefs.

==== 2023 ====
On February 28, 2023, the Philadelphia Eagles hired Seattle Seahawks defensive assistant Sean Desai to be their new defensive coordinator, after Jonathan Gannon accepted the head coach position with the Arizona Cardinals. On March 15, 2023, the Eagles released Slay, but re-signed him to a contract extension the next day. On March 16, 2023, the Eagles re-signed Slay to a three–year, $42.00 million contract extension that included $24.50 million guaranteed upon signing and an initial signing bonus of $10.18 million.

On September 10, 2023, Slay started in the Eagles' season-opener at the New England Patriots and recorded three solo tackles, made three pass deflections, and had a pick-six after intercepting a pass by Mac Jones to wide receiver Kendrick Bourne and returning it for a 70–yard touchdown in their 25–20 victory. In Week 4, he set a season-high with 11 combined tackles (10 solo) as the Eagles defeated the Washington Commanders in overtime 34–31. Due to a knee injury, Slay was inactive as the Eagles lost 14–20 at the New York Jets in Week 6. Josh Jobe earned the start in his absence and in response to his injury the Eagles signed Bradley Roby. On October 22, 2023, Slay recorded four solo tackles, made two pass deflections, and picked off a pass thrown by Tua Tagovailoa during a 31–17 victory against the Miami Dolphins. On December 16, 2023, Eagles' head coach Nick Sirianni announced that Slay had undergone arthroscopic knee surgery for a lingering knee injury that has plagued him throughout the season and would remain inactive for the rest of the season (Weeks 15–18). He finished the season with a total of 57 combined tackles (48 solo), 14 passes defended, and two interceptions in 12 games and 12 starts. He earned Pro Bowl honors for the sixth time. He received an overall grade of 66.0 from Pro Football Focus in 2023.

==== 2024 ====
On January 21, 2024, the Philadelphia Eagles fired defensive coordinator Sean Desai and named Vic Fangio as their new defensive coordinator six days after. Fangio retained Slay as the No. 1 starting cornerback and paired him with rookie first-round pick Quinyon Mitchell to start the season after James Bradberry tore his ACL in training camp.

On September 29, 2024, Slay set a season-high with nine combined tackles (eight solo) and broke up a pass during a 16–33 loss at the Tampa Bay Buccaneers. He was inactive for the Eagles' 26–23 victory against the Jacksonville Jaguars in Week 9 due to a groin injury. In Week 12, Slay recorded three combined tackles (two solo) and had one pass deflection before he exited in the third quarter of a 37–20 win at the Los Angeles Rams after suffering a concussion when he took a helmet-to-helmet hit from tight end Colby Parkinson while attempting a tackle on a 10–yard reception. He remained in concussion protocol and was subsequently inactive as the Eagles won 24–19 at the Baltimore Ravens in Week 13. In Week 16, he recorded seven combined tackles (five solo) and set a new season-high with three pass deflections during a 33–36 loss at the Washington Commanders. Head coach Nick Sirianni rendered Slay, as well as multiple starters, inactive for the Eagles' 20-13 win against the New York Giants in Week 18 in order for them to rest and prepare for the playoffs. He finished the with a total of 49 combined tackles (39 solo), 13 passes defended, and one forced fumble in 14 games and 14 starts. Since 2021, Slay has recorded 39 passes defended, tying Patrick Surtain II for the most in the NFL during that span. He received an overall grade of 73.3 from Pro Football Focus in 2024.

The Philadelphia Eagles finished the 2024 NFL season first in the NFC East with a 14–3 record. On January 12, 2025, Slay made three combined tackles (two solo), broke up a pass, and intercepted a pass attempt thrown by Jordan Love to wide receiver Dontayvion Wicks during a 22–10 win over the Green Bay Packers in the NFC Wild Card Round, his first career playoff interception. The following week, he recorded six combined tackles (five solo) and led the team with three pass deflections as the Eagles defeated the Los Angeles Rams 28–22 in the Divisional Round. He started in the NFC Championship Game and made three solo tackles and one pass deflection during a 55–23 victory against the Washington Commanders. On February 9, 2025, Slay started in Super Bowl LIX in a rematch of Super Bowl LVII two years earlier, but was limited to two solo tackles as they defeated the Kansas City Chiefs 40–22. He earned his first Super Bowl title and Super Bowl ring.

On March 12, 2025, the Philadelphia Eagles officially released Slay after five seasons and opted out of his contract with one season still remaining.

=== Pittsburgh Steelers ===
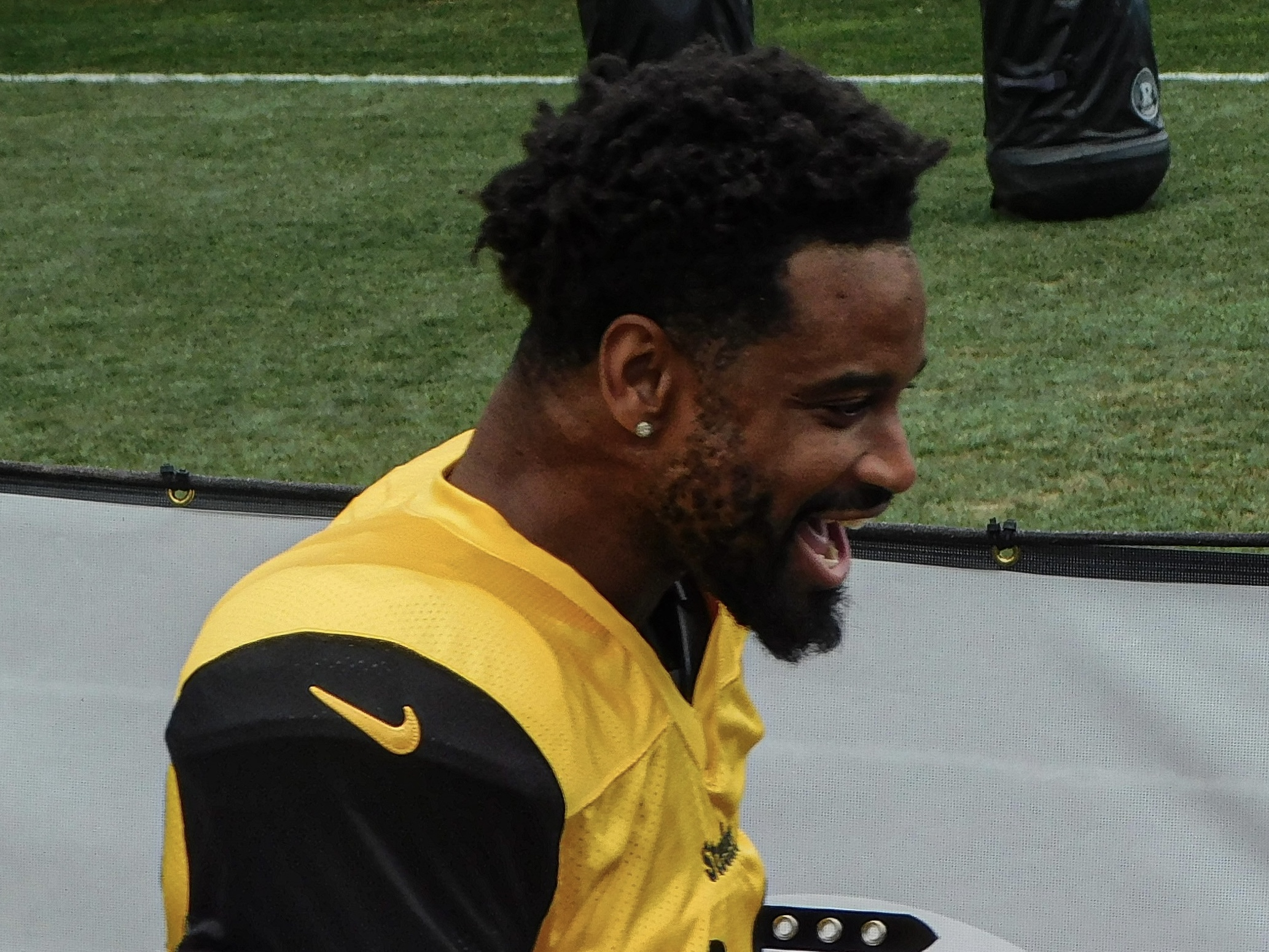
Slay in 2025

On March 13, 2025, the Pittsburgh Steelers signed Slay to a one-year, $10 million contract that includes an initial signing bonus of $8.74 million. Slay appeared in nine games with the Steelers, recording three pass deflections, one fumble recovery, and 36 combined tackles. On December 2, Slay and the Steelers mutually agreed to part ways.

=== Buffalo Bills ===
On December 3, 2025, Slay was claimed off waivers by the Buffalo Bills. However, a day after being claimed, Slay notified the Bills that he was considering retirement, and would not report to the team. If he decided to return, the Bills would retain his rights, as he has not been released.

On March 16, 2026, Slay announced his retirement after 13 seasons in the NFL.

== NFL career statistics ==
Legend
	Won the Super Bowl
	Led the league
**Bold**	Career high

=== Regular season ===
Year	Team	Games		Tackles				Interceptions						Fumbles			
Year	Team	GP	GS	Cmb	Solo	Ast	Sck	PD	Int	Yds	Avg	Lng	TD	FF	FR	Yds	TD
2013	DET	13	4	34	27	7	0.0	5	0	0	0.0	0	0	0	0	0	0
2014	DET	16	16	**61**	48	13	0.0	17	2	42	21.0	42	0	0	0	0	0
2015	DET	16	16	59	48	11	0.0	13	2	0	0.0	0	0	0	0	0	0
2016	DET	13	13	44	43	1	**1.0**	13	2	24	12.0	13	0	**1**	0	0	0
2017	DET	16	16	60	**54**	6	0.0	**26**	**8**	73	9.1	37	0	0	1	0	0
2018	DET	15	15	43	40	3	0.0	17	3	**107**	35.7	67T	**1**	0	0	0	0
2019	DET	14	14	46	36	10	0.0	13	2	19	9.5	19	0	0	1	38	0
2020	PHI	15	14	59	53	6	0.0	6	1	25	25.0	25	0	0	0	0	0
2021	PHI	16	16	52	40	12	0.0	9	3	72	24.0	51T	**1**	0	**2**	**116**	**2**
2022	PHI	**17**	**17**	55	40	**15**	0.0	14	3	17	5.7	19	0	0	0	0	0
2023	PHI	12	12	57	48	9	0.0	14	2	86	**43.0**	**70T**	**1**	0	0	0	0
2024	PHI	14	14	49	39	10	0.0	13	0	0	0.0	0	0	**1**	1	0	0
2025	PIT	10	9	36	28	8	0.0	3	0	0	0.0	0	0	0	1	-6	0
Career		187	176	655	544	111	1.0	163	28	465	16.6	70	3	2	6	148	2

=== Postseason ===
Year	Team	Games		Tackles				Interceptions						Fumbles	
Year	Team	GP	GS	Cmb	Solo	Ast	Sck	PD	Int	Yds	Avg	Lng	TD	FF	FR
2014	DET	1	1	1	1	0	0.0	1	0	0	0.0	0	0	0	0
2016	DET	1	1	2	1	1	0.0	0	0	0	0.0	0	0	0	0
2021	PHI	1	1	5	4	1	0.0	1	0	0	0.0	0	0	0	0
2022	PHI	3	3	12	8	**4**	0.0	1	0	0	0.0	0	0	0	0
2023	PHI	1	1	6	4	2	0.0	0	0	0	0.0	0	0	0	0
2024	PHI	**4**	**4**	**14**	**12**	2	0.0	**5**	**1**	0	0.0	0	0	0	0
Career		11	11	40	30	10	0.0	8	1	0	0.0	0	0	0	0

== Personal life ==
Slay was given the nickname "Big Play Slay" upon transferring to Mississippi State in 2011 by Bulldogs defensive coordinator Geoff Collins. Slay continued using the nickname during his NFL career, including referring to himself as such in player introductions during national telecasts, and hosts a weekly in-season podcast of the same name.

Slay is second cousins with former Lions teammate Tracy Walker. Slay is also distantly related to Ahmaud Arbery, who was murdered in February 2020.
