= 2021 Philadelphia Eagles season =

89th season in franchise history

- Owner: Jeffrey Lurie
- General manager: Howie Roseman
- Head coach: Nick Sirianni
- Offensive coordinator: Shane Steichen
- Defensive coordinator: Jonathan Gannon
- Home stadium: Lincoln Financial Field

Results
- Record: 9–8
- Division place: 2nd NFC East
- Playoffs: Lost Wild Card Playoffs (at Buccaneers) 15−31
- All-Pros: 2: C Jason Kelce (1st team); RT Lane Johnson (2nd team)
- Pro Bowlers: 5: C Jason Kelce; DE Josh Sweat; DT Javon Hargrave; CB Darius Slay; K Jake Elliott

Uniform
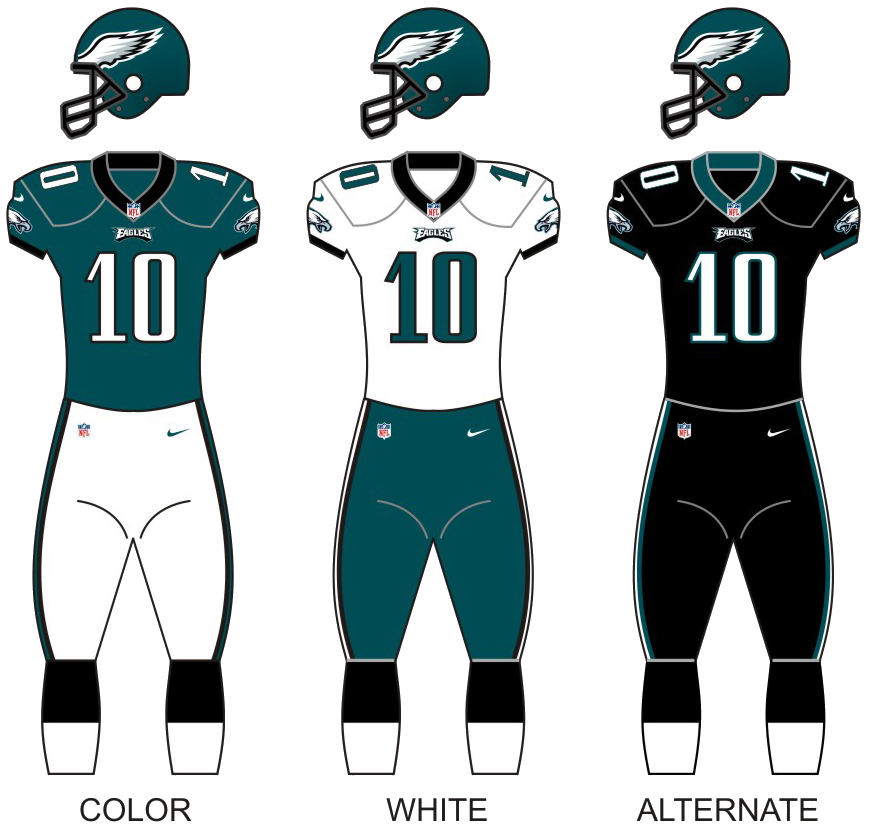

The 2021 season was the Philadelphia Eagles' 89th season in the National Football League (NFL) and their first under head coach Nick Sirianni. They improved on their 4–11–1 record from the previous season after a 40–29 win against the New Orleans Saints in Week 11 and returned to the playoffs after a one-year absence. This was the Eagles' first season since 2015 without quarterback Carson Wentz, as he was traded to the Indianapolis Colts in March 2021.

Philadelphia entered the season with low expectations following a disastrous 4–11–1 2020 season that resulted in the firing of Super Bowl champion head coach Doug Pederson. The Eagles started the 2021 season slowly with a 2–5 record. However, things turned around and the Eagles went 7–2 in their next 9 games and clinched a playoff berth after a one-year absence. The Eagles finished tied with the New Orleans Saints for the last Wild Card spot, but won the tiebreaker based on their Week 11 head-to-head victory over the Saints. The Eagles went on to face the Tampa Bay Buccaneers in the Wild Card round, but lost by a score of 31–15 to the defending champions.

Despite the 9–8 record, the Eagles did not beat any team that made the playoffs in the 2021 season, going 0–6. New Orleans was the only team with a winning record that the Eagles beat during the season.

== Roster changes ==
=== Free agents ===
Position	Player	Tag	2021 team	Notes
RB	Corey Clement	UFA	New York Giants	1 year
DE	Vinny Curry	UFA	New York Jets	1 year
S	Rudy Ford	UFA	Jacksonville Jaguars	2 years
LB	Nathan Gerry	UFA	San Francisco 49ers	1 year
CB	Cre'Von LeBlanc	UFA	Miami Dolphins	1 year
S	Jalen Mills	UFA	New England Patriots	4 years
OT	Jason Peters	UFA	Chicago Bears	1 year
DT	Hassan Ridgeway	UFA	Philadelphia Eagles	1 year
LB	Duke Riley	UFA	Miami Dolphins	1 year
CB	Nickell Robey-Coleman	UFA	Detroit Lions	1 year
TE	Richard Rodgers	UFA	Philadelphia Eagles	1 year
QB	Nate Sudfeld	UFA	San Francisco 49ers	1 year
P	Cameron Johnston	RFA	Houston Texans	3 years
TE	Joshua Perkins	RFA	San Francisco 49ers	1 year
RB	Boston Scott	ERFA	Philadelphia Eagles	1 year
LB	Alex Singleton	ERFA	Philadelphia Eagles	1 year
WR	Greg Ward	ERFA	Philadelphia Eagles	1 year

Player re-signed by the Eagles	Player not re-signed by the Eagles

=== Signings ===
Position	Player	Tag	2020 team	Date signed	Notes
RB	Adrian Killins	UFA	Philadelphia Eagles	March 17	2 years
S	Andrew Adams	UFA	Tampa Bay Buccaneers	March 18	1 year, $1.13 million
S	Anthony Harris	UFA	Minnesota Vikings	March 20	1 year, $5 million
QB	Joe Flacco	UFA	New York Jets	March 23	1 year, $3.5 million
LB	Eric Wilson	UFA	Minnesota Vikings	April 7	1 year, $3.25 million
RB	Jordan Howard	UFA	Philadelphia Eagles	April 7	1 year, $990,000
RB	Kerryon Johnson	WVR	Detroit Lions	May 7	1 year
CB	Nate Meadors	UFA	Jacksonville Jaguars	May 14	1 year
DE	Ryan Kerrigan	UFA	Washington Football Team	May 17	1 year, $2.5 million
OT	Casey Tucker	UFA	Indianapolis Colts	May 18	1 year
OT	Le'Raven Clark	UFA	Indianapolis Colts	May 19	1 year, $1.065 million
DT	Willie Henry	UFA	Houston Texans	May 25	1 year
WR	Michael Walker	UFA	Jacksonville Jaguars	June 11	1 year
QB	Nick Mullens	UFA	San Francisco 49ers	June 14	1 year
CB	Steven Nelson	UFA	Pittsburgh Steelers	July 25	1 year, 2.5 million
S	Obi Melifonwu	UFA	San Francisco 49ers	July 29	1 year
WR	Andre Patton	UFA	Miami Dolphins	July 29	1 year
S	Blake Countess	UFA	Philadelphia Eagles	August 9	1 year
WR	Marken Michel	WVR	Carolina Panthers	August 10	1 year
TE	Cary Angeline	UFA	Arizona Cardinals	August 22	1 year
CB	Andre Chachere	WVR	Indianapolis Colts	September 2	1 year
CB	Mac McCain	UFA	Denver Broncos	September 7	1 year
G	Jack Anderson	UFA	Buffalo Bills	September 21	1 year
QB	Reid Sinnett	WVR	Miami Dolphins	October 25	1 year
LS	Rick Lovato	UFA	Philadelphia Eagles	October 26	1 year
RB	Jordan Howard	UFA	Philadelphia Eagles	November 10	1 year
CB	Mac McCain	WVR	Denver Broncos	November 24	1 year
OT	Le'Raven Clark	UFA	Philadelphia Eagles	December 8	2 years

=== Departures ===
Position	Player	2021 team	Date	Reason
WR	DeSean Jackson	Los Angeles Rams	February 19	Released
S	Blake Countess	Philadelphia Eagles	March 4	Released
DT	Treyvon Hester	Buffalo Bills	March 4	Released
DT	Malik Jackson	Cleveland Browns	March 17	Released
WR	Alshon Jeffery		March 17	Released
WR	Deontay Burnett		March 23	Released
LB	Joe Bachie	Cincinnati Bengals	May 25	Released
QB	Jamie Newman		June 9	Released
WR	Khalil Tate		June 9	Released
WR	Trevon Grimes		June 21	Released
DT	Willie Henry	New York Giants	July 25	Released
CB	Shakial Taylor		August 5	Released
WR	Adrian Killins	Denver Broncos	August 14	Released
TE	Caleb Wilson	Washington Football Team	August 14	Released
RB	Kerryon Johnson		August 26	Released
QB	Nick Mullens	Cleveland Browns	August 28	Released
DT	T. Y. McGill		September 13	Released
LS	Rick Lovato	Philadelphia Eagles	October 25	Released
OT	Brett Toth	Philadelphia Eagles	November 2	Released
LB	Eric Wilson	Houston Texans	November 3	Released
CB	Mac McCain	Denver Broncos	November 9	Released
CB	Mac McCain	Philadelphia Eagles	December 8	Released

=== Trades ===
- March 17: The Eagles traded QB Carson Wentz to the Indianapolis Colts for a third-round pick in the 2021 NFL draft and a conditional second-round pick in the 2022 NFL draft.
- March 17: Per the terms that saw WR Marquise Goodwin traded to the Philadelphia Eagles in 2020, Goodwin has reverted to San Francisco 49ers after not appearing for Philadelphia. The Eagles received a seventh-round selection in the 2021 NFL draft from 49ers as part of this deal.
- May 18: The Eagles traded CB Jameson Houston and a sixth-round pick in the 2023 NFL draft to the Jacksonville Jaguars for CB Josiah Scott.
- August 28: The Eagles traded a conditional sixth-round pick in the 2022 NFL draft to the Jacksonville Jaguars for QB Gardner Minshew.
- August 31: The Eagles traded G Matt Pryor and a seventh-round pick in the 2022 NFL draft to the Indianapolis Colts for a sixth-round pick in the 2022 NFL draft.
- October 15: The Eagles traded TE Zach Ertz to the Arizona Cardinals for CB Tay Gowan and a fifth-round pick in the 2022 NFL draft.
- October 25: The Eagles traded QB Joe Flacco to the New York Jets for a conditional sixth-round pick in the 2022 NFL draft.
- November 2: The Eagles traded a sixth-round pick in the 2022 NFL draft to the Denver Broncos for CB Kary Vincent Jr.

== Draft ==
2021 Philadelphia Eagles draft
Round	Pick	Player	Position	College	Notes
1	10	DeVonta Smith	WR	Alabama	From Dallas
2	37	Landon Dickerson *	C	Alabama	
3	73	Milton Williams	DT	Louisiana Tech	From Carolina
4	123	Zech McPhearson	CB	Texas Tech	From Miami
5	150	Kenneth Gainwell	RB	Memphis	
6	189	Marlon Tuipulotu	DT	USC	
6	191	Tarron Jackson	DE	Coastal Carolina	From Denver via Carolina
6	224	JaCoby Stevens	LB	LSU	Compensatory pick
7	234	Patrick Johnson	LB	Tulane	
Made roster † Pro Football Hall of Fame * Made at least one Pro Bowl during career

Draft Notes

- The Eagles received two compensatory selections, both in the sixth round (224th and 225th overall).
- The Eagles traded a fourth-round selection (110th) to the Cleveland Browns in exchange for defensive end Genard Avery.
- The Eagles received a third-round selection (84th) and a 2022 conditional second-round selection, which became a first-round selection, from the Indianapolis Colts in exchange for quarterback Carson Wentz
- The Eagles received 2020 and 2021 fifth-round selections (156th) from the Dallas Cowboys in exchange for a 2020 fourth-round selection.
- The Eagles received 2021 seventh-round selection (240th) from the San Francisco 49ers as part of the deal that saw Marquise Goodwin revert to the 49ers.
- The Eagles traded their first-round selection (6th) and a fifth-round selection (156th) to the Miami Dolphins in exchange for a first-round selection (12th), a fourth-round selection (123rd), and a 2022 first-round selection.
- The Eagles traded their first-round selection (12th) and third-round selection (84th) to the Dallas Cowboys in exchange for a first round selection (10th)
- Philadelphia traded a third-round selection (70th) to Carolina in exchange for third and sixth-round selections (73rd and 191st)
- The Eagles traded a sixth-round selection (225th) and a seventh-round selection (240th) to the Washington Football Team in exchange for a fifth-round selection in the 2022 NFL draft

Undrafted free agents
Player	Position	College
Jhamon Ausbon	WR	Texas A&M
Kayode Awosika	OT	Buffalo
JaQuan Bailey	DE	Iowa State
Harry Crider	C	Indiana
Trevon Grimes	WR	Florida
Jamie Newman	QB	Wake Forest
Jack Stoll	TE	Nebraska

== Staff ==
2021 Philadelphia Eagles staff
Front office: Chairman/CEO – Jeffrey Lurie; President – Don Smolenski; General manager/executive vice president – Howie Roseman; Senior advisor to the General Manager/Chief Security Officer - Dom DiSandro; Vice president of football operations – Catherine Raiche; Vice president of football operations & strategy - Alec Halaby; Vice president of football operations & compliance - Jon Ferrari; Vice president of football administration – Jake Rosenberg; Senior director of football transactions - Bryce Johnson; Vice president of player personnel – Andy Weidl; Senior football advisor – Tom Donahoe; Director of player personnel – Brandon Brown; Director of player personnel – Ian Cunningham; Personnel executive – Dave Caldwell; Player personnel executive – T.J. McCreight; Senior director of college scouting – Anthony Patch; Director of college scouting – Alan Wolking; Assistant director of pro scouting - Max Gruder; Senior pro scout - Jeff Scott; Area scout - Phil Bhaya; Area scout - Ryan Myers; Assistant director of analytics - James Gilman; Football operations analyst - John Liu; Special assistant to the general manager – Connor Barwin; Head coaches: Head coach – Nick Sirianni; Assistant head coach/running backs – Jemal Singleton; Offensive coaches: Offensive coordinator – Shane Steichen; Passing game coordinator – Kevin Patullo; Quarterbacks – Brian Johnson; Wide receivers – Aaron Moorehead; Tight ends – Jason Michael; Run game coordinator/offensive line – Jeff Stoutland; Assistant offensive line – Roy Istvan; Offensive quality control – T. J. Paganetti; Offensive quality control – Alex Tanney	Defensive coaches: Defensive coordinator – Jonathan Gannon; Defensive line – Tracy Rocker; Linebackers – Nick Rallis; Defensive backs – Dennard Wilson; Assistant defensive backs – D.K. McDonald; Defensive quality control – Joe Kasper; Special teams coaches: Special teams coordinator – Michael Clay; Assistant special teams – Joe Pannunzio; Special teams quality control – Tyler Brown; Strength and conditioning: Vice president of player performance – Ted Rath; Head strength and conditioning – Fernando Noriega

== Final roster ==
2021 Philadelphia Eagles roster
Quarterbacks (QB): 1 Jalen Hurts; 10 Gardner Minshew; 7 Reid Sinnett; Running backs (RB): 14 Kenneth Gainwell; 24 Jordan Howard; 32 Jason Huntley; 26 Miles Sanders; 35 Boston Scott; Wide receivers (WR): 18 Jalen Reagor; 6 DeVonta Smith; 84 Greg Ward; 16 Quez Watkins; Tight ends (TE): 88 Dallas Goedert; 81 Richard Rodgers; 89 Jack Stoll	Offensive linemen (OL): 76 Jack Anderson G; 74 Le'Raven Clark T; 69 Landon Dickerson G; 77 Andre Dillard T; 67 Nate Herbig G; 65 Lane Johnson T; 62 Jason Kelce C; 68 Jordan Mailata T; 78 Sua Opeta G; Defensive linemen (DL): 96 Derek Barnett DE; 91 Fletcher Cox DT; 97 Javon Hargrave DT; 75 Tarron Jackson DE; 90 Ryan Kerrigan DE; 98 Hassan Ridgeway DT; 94 Josh Sweat DE; 93 Milton Williams DT	Linebackers (LB): 58 Genard Avery OLB; 54 Shaun Bradley MLB; 57 T. J. Edwards MLB; 48 Patrick Johnson OLB; 49 Alex Singleton OLB; Defensive backs (DB): 21 Andre Chachere CB; 22 Marcus Epps FS; 36 Tay Gowan CB; 28 Anthony Harris SS; 29 Avonte Maddox CB; 23 Rodney McLeod FS; 27 Zech McPhearson CB; 3 Steven Nelson CB; 33 Josiah Scott CB; 2 Darius Slay CB; 34 Kary Vincent Jr. CB; 42 K'Von Wallace SS; Special teams (ST): 4 Jake Elliott K; 45 Rick Lovato LS; 8 Arryn Siposs P	Practice squad: 72 Kayode Awosika G; 85 Deon Cain WR; 53 Christian Elliss MLB; 82 John Hightower WR; 31 Craig James CB; 17 KeeSean Johnson WR; 51 Luke Juriga G; 66 Matt Leo DE (IPP); 59 Cameron Malveaux DE; 41 Jared Mayden FS; 37 Mac McCain CB; 30 JaCoby Stevens OLB; 83 Noah Togiai TE; 50 Casey Tucker T; 61 Raequan Williams DT; 73 Marvin Wilson DT; Reserve: 19 J. J. Arcega-Whiteside WR (IR); 79 Brandon Brooks G (IR); -- Jason Croom TE (IR); 63 Jack Driscoll T (IR); 55 Brandon Graham DE (IR); 80 Tyree Jackson TE (IR); -- Joe Ostman DE (IR); 56 Isaac Seumalo G (IR); 52 Davion Taylor OLB (IR); 64 Brett Toth T (IR); 95 Marlon Tuipulotu DT (COVID-19); Rookies in italics 50 active, 11 reserve, 15 practice squad (1 exempt)

== Preseason ==
Week	Date	Opponent	Result	Record	Venue	Recap
1	August 12	Pittsburgh Steelers	L 16–24	0–1	Lincoln Financial Field	Recap
2	August 19	New England Patriots	L 0–35	0–2	Lincoln Financial Field	Recap
3	August 27	at New York Jets	T 31–31	0–2–1	MetLife Stadium	Recap

== Regular season ==
=== Schedule ===
The Eagles' 2021 schedule was announced on May 12.

Week	Date	Opponent	Result	Record	Venue	Recap
1	September 12	at Atlanta Falcons	**W** 32–6	1–0	Mercedes-Benz Stadium	Recap
2	September 19	San Francisco 49ers	**L** 11–17	1–1	Lincoln Financial Field	Recap
3	September 27	at **Dallas Cowboys**	**L** 21–41	1–2	AT&T Stadium	Recap
4	October 3	Kansas City Chiefs	**L** 30–42	1–3	Lincoln Financial Field	Recap
5	October 10	at Carolina Panthers	**W** 21–18	2–3	Bank of America Stadium	Recap
6	October 14	Tampa Bay Buccaneers	**L** 22–28	2–4	Lincoln Financial Field	Recap
7	October 24	at Las Vegas Raiders	**L** 22–33	2–5	Allegiant Stadium	Recap
8	October 31	at Detroit Lions	**W** 44–6	3–5	Ford Field	Recap
9	November 7	Los Angeles Chargers	**L** 24–27	3–6	Lincoln Financial Field	Recap
10	November 14	at Denver Broncos	**W** 30–13	4–6	Empower Field at Mile High	Recap
11	November 21	New Orleans Saints	**W** 40–29	5–6	Lincoln Financial Field	Recap
12	November 28	at **New York Giants**	**L** 7–13	5–7	MetLife Stadium	Recap
13	December 5	at New York Jets	**W** 33–18	6–7	MetLife Stadium	Recap
14	Bye					
15	December 21	**Washington Football Team**	**W** 27–17	7–7	Lincoln Financial Field	Recap
16	December 26	**New York Giants**	**W** 34–10	8–7	Lincoln Financial Field	Recap
17	January 2	at **Washington Football Team**	**W** 20–16	9–7	FedExField	Recap
18	January 8	**Dallas Cowboys**	**L** 26–51	9–8	Lincoln Financial Field	Recap

Note: Intra-division opponents are in bold text.

=== Game summaries ===
==== Week 1: at Atlanta Falcons ====
Week 1: Philadelphia Eagles at Atlanta Falcons – Game summary

Quarter	1	2	3	4	Total
**Eagles**	7	8	7	10	**32**
Falcons	3	3	0	0	**6**

at Mercedes-Benz Stadium, Atlanta, Georgia

- Date: September 12
- Game time: 1:00 p.m. EDT
- Game weather: Fair, 81 °F (27 °C) — retractable roof open
- Game attendance: 68,633
- Referee: Scott Novak
- TV announcers (Fox): Kevin Burkhardt, Greg Olsen and Pam Oliver
- Recap, Game Book

Game information

**First quarter**

- ATL – Younghoe Koo 21-yard field goal, 9:58. Falcons 3–0. **Drive: 14 plays, 72 yards, 5:02.**
- PHI – DeVonta Smith 18-yard pass from Jalen Hurts (Jake Elliott kick), 6:17. Eagles 7–3. **Drive: 7 plays, 75 yards, 3:41.**

**Second quarter**

- ATL – Younghoe Koo 27-yard field goal, 14:52. Eagles 7–6. **Drive: 15 plays, 74 yards, 6:25.**
- PHI – Dallas Goedert 9-yard pass from Jalen Hurts (Miles Sanders run), 0:02. Eagles 15–6. **Drive: 12 plays, 62 yards, 1:42.**

**Third quarter**

- PHI – Kenneth Gainwell 8-yard run (Jake Elliott kick), 1:25. Eagles 22–6. **Drive: 6 plays, 50 yards, 2:59.**

**Fourth quarter**

- PHI – Jalen Reagor 23-yard pass from Jalen Hurts (Jake Elliott kick), 4:20. Eagles 29–6. **Drive: 2 plays, 22 yards, 1:19.**
- PHI – Jake Elliott 43-yard field goal, 1:10. Eagles 32–6. **Drive: 4 plays, 6 yards, 2:03.**

**Top passers**

- PHI – Jalen Hurts – 27/35, 264 yards, 3 TD
- ATL – Matt Ryan – 21/35, 164 yards

**Top rushers**

- PHI – Miles Sanders – 15 rushes, 74 yards
- ATL – Cordarrelle Patterson – 7 rushes, 54 yards

**Top receivers**

- PHI – DeVonta Smith – 6 receptions, 71 yards, TD
- ATL – Calvin Ridley – 5 receptions, 51 yards

After an Atlanta field goal, the Eagles would take the lead after an 18 yard pass from Jalen Hurts to DeVonta Smith and never looked back. The week one rout over the Falcons was the Eagles biggest win, scoring over 30 points, and have a winning record (1-0) for the first time since 2019. This is also the Eagles first win in Atlanta since 2009.

==== Week 2: vs. San Francisco 49ers ====
Week 2: San Francisco 49ers at Philadelphia Eagles – Game summary

Quarter	1	2	3	4	Total
**49ers**	0	7	0	10	**17**
Eagles	3	0	0	8	**11**

at Lincoln Financial Field, Philadelphia, Pennsylvania

- Date: September 19
- Game time: 1:00 p.m. EDT
- Game weather: Clear, 75 °F (24 °C)
- Game attendance: 69,796
- Referee: Brad Allen
- TV announcers (Fox): Adam Amin, Mark Schlereth and Shannon Spake
- Recap, Game Book

Game information

**First quarter**

- PHI – Jake Elliott 45-yard field goal, 4:45. Eagles 3–0. **Drive: 11 plays, 53 yards, 4:43.**

**Second quarter**

- SF – Jauan Jennings 11-yard pass from Jimmy Garoppolo (Robbie Gould kick), 0:12. 49ers 7–3. **Drive: 12 plays, 97 yards, 4:08.**

**Third quarter**

- No scoring plays.

**Fourth quarter**

- SF – Jimmy Garoppolo 1-yard run (Robbie Gould kick), 10:52. 49ers 14–3. **Drive: 16 plays, 92 yards, 8:59.**
- SF – Robbie Gould 46-yard field goal, 5:07. 49ers 17–3. **Drive: 9 plays, 53 yards, 3:10.**
- PHI – Jalen Hurts 1-yard run (Kenneth Gainwell run), 4:02. 49ers 17–11. **Drive: 5 plays, 75 yards, 1:05.**

**Top passers**

- SF – Jimmy Garoppolo – 22/30, 189 yards, TD
- PHI – Jalen Hurts – 12/23, 190 yards

**Top rushers**

- SF – Elijah Mitchell – 17 rushes, 42 yards
- PHI – Jalen Hurts – 10 rushes, 82 yards, TD

**Top receivers**

- SF – Deebo Samuel – 6 receptions, 93 yards
- PHI – Quez Watkins – 2 receptions, 117 yards

The Eagles would start the game being able to march down the field throughout the first half, including a 91 yard bomb from Jalen Hurts to Quez Watkins. However, after a failed "Philly Special" attempt, and blocked field goal, the Birds could only muster 3 points in the first half. The 49ers would tack on 10 points in the 4th quarter before surrendering a late QB sneak TD from Hurts. The loss dropped the Eagles to 1-1 and their first loss to the 49ers since 2014.

==== Week 3: at Dallas Cowboys ====
Week 3: Philadelphia Eagles at Dallas Cowboys – Game summary

Quarter	1	2	3	4	Total
Eagles	7	0	7	7	**21**
**Cowboys**	14	6	7	14	**41**

at AT&T Stadium, Arlington, Texas

- Date: September 27
- Game time: 8:15 p.m. EDT/7:15 p.m. CDT
- Game weather: 84 °F (29 °C) (retractable roof open)
- Game attendance: 93,267
- Referee: Brad Rogers
- TV announcers (ESPN): Steve Levy, Brian Griese, Louis Riddick, Lisa Salters and John Parry
- Recap, Game Book

Game information

**First quarter**

- DAL – Ezekiel Elliott 1-yard run (Greg Zuerlein kick), 11:47. Cowboys 7–0. **Drive: 6 plays, 75 yards, 3:13.**
- PHI – Fletcher Cox fumble recovery in end zone (Jake Elliott kick), 9:57. Tied 7–7.
- DAL – Dalton Schultz 19-yard pass from Dak Prescott (Greg Zuerlein kick), 1:31. Cowboys 14–7. **Drive: 6 plays, 50 yards, 3:06.**

**Second quarter**

- DAL – Ezekiel Elliott 3-yard run (kick failed), 7:10. Cowboys 20–7. **Drive: 13 plays, 65 yards, 7:50.**

**Third quarter**

- DAL – Trevon Diggs 59-yard interception return (Greg Zuerlein kick), 14:07. Cowboys 27–7.
- PHI – Zach Ertz 3-yard pass from Jalen Hurts (Jake Elliott kick), 7:08. Cowboys 27–14. **Drive: 8 plays, 90 yards, 3:55.**

**Fourth quarter**

- DAL – Cedrick Wilson Jr. 2-yard pass from Dak Prescott (Greg Zuerlein kick), 11:26. Cowboys 34–14. **Drive: 12 plays, 61 yards, 6:12.**
- DAL – Dalton Schultz 22-yard pass from Dak Prescott (Greg Zuerlein kick), 6:56. Cowboys 41–14. **Drive: 3 plays, 31 yards, 1:20.**
- PHI – Greg Ward 15-yard pass from Jalen Hurts (Jake Elliott kick), 3:09. Cowboys 41–21. **Drive: 7 plays, 75 yards, 3:47.**

**Top passers**

- PHI – Jalen Hurts – 25/39, 326 yards, 2 TD, 2 INT
- DAL – Dak Prescott – 21/26, 238 yards, 3 TD

**Top rushers**

- PHI – Jalen Hurts – 9 rushes, 35 yards
- DAL – Ezekiel Elliott – 17 rushes, 95 yards, 2 TD

**Top receivers**

- PHI – Dallas Goedert – 2 receptions, 66 yards
- DAL – Dalton Schultz – 6 receptions, 80 yards, 2 TD

The Eagles traveled down to Arlington, Texas to take on the Dallas Cowboys on Monday Night Football. The Cowboys would jump on the board quickly after an Ezekiel Elliott 1 yard TD. The Eagles defense made a play by stripping the ball from Dak Prescott in their own endzone resulting in a touchdown from Fletcher Cox. From that point on, the Dallas offense had its way on the Eagles defense and didn't get any help from a pass heavy Eagles offense that could not gain much momentum. The Eagles would get a couple of garbage time TDs from Jalen Hurts to Zach Ertz and Greg Ward. With the loss, the Eagles would fall to 1-2 and lose their 4th straight game at AT&T Stadium.

==== Week 4: vs. Kansas City Chiefs ====
Week 4: Kansas City Chiefs at Philadelphia Eagles – Game summary

Quarter	1	2	3	4	Total
**Chiefs**	7	14	7	14	**42**
Eagles	10	3	3	14	**30**

at Lincoln Financial Field, Philadelphia, Pennsylvania

- Date: October 3
- Game time: 1:00 p.m. EDT
- Game weather: Partly cloudy, 73 °F (23 °C)
- Game attendance: 69,796
- Referee: Land Clark
- TV announcers (CBS): Ian Eagle, Charles Davis and Evan Washburn
- Recap, Game Book

Game information

**First quarter**

- PHI – Jake Elliott 29-yard field goal, 11:38. Eagles 3–0. **Drive: 8 plays, 64 yards, 3:22.**
- KC – Clyde Edwards-Helaire 1-yard pass from Patrick Mahomes (Harrison Butker kick), 8:02. Chiefs 7–3. **Drive: 8 plays, 77 yards, 3:36.**
- PHI – Dallas Goedert 3-yard pass from Jalen Hurts (Jake Elliott kick), 1:57. Eagles 10–7. **Drive: 12 plays, 84 yards, 6:05.**

**Second quarter**

- KC – Tyreek Hill 6-yard pass from Patrick Mahomes (Harrison Butker kick), 9:25. Chiefs 14–10. **Drive: 12 plays, 83 yards, 7:32.**
- PHI – Jake Elliott 25-yard field goal, 3:35. Chiefs 14–13. **Drive: 13 plays, 68 yards, 5:50.**
- KC – Jody Fortson 2-yard pass from Patrick Mahomes (Harrison Butker kick), 0:56. Chiefs 21–13. **Drive: 8 plays, 75 yards, 2:39.**

**Third quarter**

- PHI – Jake Elliott 31-yard field goal, 7:07. Chiefs 21–16. **Drive: 10 plays, 36 yards, 5:02.**
- KC – Darrel Williams 1-yard run (Harrison Butker kick), 0:51. Chiefs 28–16. **Drive: 8 plays, 75 yards, 6:16.**

**Fourth quarter**

- PHI – Kenneth Gainwell 7-yard run (Jake Elliott kick), 12:42. Chiefs 28–23. **Drive: 7 plays, 56 yards, 3:09.**
- KC – Tyreek Hill 12-yard pass from Patrick Mahomes (Harrison Butker kick), 6:44. Chiefs 35–23. **Drive: 11 plays, 75 yards, 5:58.**
- KC – Tyreek Hill 44-yard pass from Patrick Mahomes (Harrison Butker kick), 2:30. Chiefs 42–23. **Drive: 6 plays, 65 yards, 1:56.**
- PHI – Greg Ward 15-yard pass from Jalen Hurts (Jake Elliott kick), 0:04. Chiefs 42–30. **Drive: 10 plays, 75 yards, 2:26.**

**Top passers**

- KC – Patrick Mahomes – 24/30, 278 yards, 5 TD, INT
- PHI – Jalen Hurts – 32/48, 387 yards, 2 TD

**Top rushers**

- KC – Clyde Edwards-Helaire – 14 rushes, 102 yards
- PHI – Jalen Hurts – 8 rushes, 47 yards

**Top receivers**

- KC – Tyreek Hill – 11 receptions, 186 yards, 3 TD
- PHI – DeVonta Smith – 7 receptions, 122 yards

==== Week 5: at Carolina Panthers ====
Week 5: Philadelphia Eagles at Carolina Panthers – Game summary

Quarter	1	2	3	4	Total
**Eagles**	3	3	7	8	**21**
Panthers	10	5	0	3	**18**

at Bank of America Stadium, Charlotte, North Carolina

- Date: October 10
- Game time: 1:00 p.m. EDT
- Game weather: Sunny, 77 °F (25 °C)
- Game attendance: 72,545
- Referee: Shawn Hochuli
- TV announcers (Fox): Joe Davis, Greg Olsen and Pam Oliver
- Recap, Game Book

Game information

**First quarter**

- CAR – Zane Gonzalez 48-yard field goal, 11:12. Panthers 3–0. **Drive: 8 plays, 32 yards, 2:27.**
- PHI – Jake Elliott 30-yard field goal, 6:47. Tied 3–3. **Drive: 4 plays, 2 yards, 2:15.**
- CAR – Tommy Tremble 5-yard pass from Sam Darnold (Zane Gonzalez kick), 3:09. Panthers 10–3. **Drive: 9 plays, 62 yards, 3:38.**

**Second quarter**

- CAR – Zane Gonzalez 43-yard field goal, 2:39. Panthers 13–3. **Drive: 6 plays, 15 yards, 3:12.**
- CAR – Jalen Hurts fumble out of bounds in end zone for a safety, 2:26. Panthers 15–3.
- PHI – Jake Elliott 58-yard field goal, 0:00. Panthers 15–6. **Drive: 5 plays, 44 yards, 0:31.**

**Third quarter**

- PHI – Jalen Hurts 1-yard run (Jake Elliott kick), 0:08. Panthers 15–13. **Drive: 6 plays, 80 yards, 2:19.**

**Fourth quarter**

- CAR – Zane Gonzalez 50-yard field goal, 8:29. Panthers 18–13. **Drive: 11 plays, 44 yards, 6:39.**
- PHI – Jalen Hurts 6-yard run (Jalen Hurts-DeVonta Smith pass), 2:38. Eagles 21–18. **Drive: 4 plays, 27 yards, 1:15.**

**Top passers**

- PHI – Jalen Hurts – 22/37, 198 yards, INT
- CAR – Sam Darnold – 21/37, 177 yards, TD, 3 INT

**Top rushers**

- PHI – Miles Sanders – 11 rushes, 45 yards
- CAR – Chuba Hubbard – 24 rushes, 101 yards

**Top receivers**

- PHI – DeVonta Smith – 7 receptions, 77 yards
- CAR – D. J. Moore – 5 receptions, 42 yards

After a slow offensive start, the Eagles would rally a second half comeback with the help of a blocked punt and outscoring the Panthers 15-3 in the second half. With the win, the Eagles improved to 2-3.

==== Week 6: vs. Tampa Bay Buccaneers ====
Week 6: Tampa Bay Buccaneers at Philadelphia Eagles – Game summary

Quarter	1	2	3	4	Total
**Buccaneers**	14	7	7	0	**28**
Eagles	7	0	7	8	**22**

at Lincoln Financial Field, Philadelphia, Pennsylvania

- Date: October 14
- Game time: 8:20 p.m. EDT
- Game weather: Partly cloudy, 70 °F (21 °C)
- Game attendance: 69,796
- Referee: Clay Martin
- TV announcers (Fox/NFLN/Prime Video): Joe Buck, Troy Aikman, Erin Andrews, Kristina Pink and Mike Pereira
- Recap, Game Book

Game information

**First quarter**

- TB – O. J. Howard 2-yard pass from Tom Brady (Ryan Succop kick), 9:26. Buccaneers 7–0. **Drive: 10 plays, 75 yards, 5:34.**
- PHI – Zach Ertz 5-yard pass from Jalen Hurts (Jake Elliott kick), 6:01. Tied 7–7. **Drive: 7 plays, 75 yards, 3:25.**
- TB – Antonio Brown 23-yard pass from Tom Brady (Ryan Succop kick), 0:33. Buccaneers 14–7. **Drive: 9 plays, 75 yards, 5:28.**

**Second quarter**

- TB – Leonard Fournette 2-yard run (Ryan Succop kick), 1:56. Buccaneers 21–7. **Drive: 11 plays, 72 yards, 5:36.**

**Third quarter**

- TB – Leonard Fournette 1-yard run (Ryan Succop kick), 5:47. Buccaneers 28–7. **Drive: 12 plays, 79 yards, 7:41.**
- PHI – Jalen Hurts 6-yard run (Jake Elliott kick), 2:15. Buccaneers 28–14. **Drive: 7 plays, 75 yards, 3:32.**

**Fourth quarter**

- PHI – Jalen Hurts 2-yard run (Jalen Hurts–Quez Watkins pass), 5:54. Buccaneers 28–22. **Drive: 7 plays, 54 yards, 3:05.**

**Top passers**

- TB – Tom Brady – 34/42, 297 yards, 2 TD, INT
- PHI – Jalen Hurts – 12/26, 115 yards, TD, INT

**Top rushers**

- TB – Leonard Fournette – 22 rushes, 81 yards, 2 TD
- PHI – Miles Sanders – 9 rushes, 56 yards

**Top receivers**

- TB – Antonio Brown – 9 receptions, 93 yards, TD
- PHI – Quez Watkins – 3 receptions, 44 yards

==== Week 7: at Las Vegas Raiders ====
Week 7: Philadelphia Eagles at Las Vegas Raiders – Game summary

Quarter	1	2	3	4	Total
Eagles	7	0	0	15	**22**
**Raiders**	0	17	13	3	**33**

at Allegiant Stadium, Paradise, Nevada

- Date: October 24
- Game time: 4:05 p.m. EDT/1:05 p.m. PDT
- Game weather: None (indoor stadium)
- Game attendance: 62,000
- Referee: Clete Blakeman
- TV announcers (Fox): Kenny Albert, Jonathan Vilma and Lindsay Czarniak
- Recap, Game Book

Game information

**First quarter**

- (11:01) PHI – Kenneth Gainwell 13-yard pass from Jalen Hurts, (Jake Elliott kick)
  **Eagles 7–0;** Drive: 8 plays, 67 yards, 3:59.

**Second quarter**

- (11:20) LV – Foster Moreau 18-yard pass from Derek Carr, (Daniel Carlson kick)
  **Tied 7–7;** Drive: 9 plays, 72 yards, 4:40.
- (1:38) LV – Josh Jacobs 8-yard run, (Daniel Carlson kick)
  **Raiders 14–7;** Drive: 10 plays, 96 yards, 4:26.
- (0:07) LV – Daniel Carlson 28-yard field goal
  **Raiders 17–7;** Drive: 7 plays, 19 yards, 1:27.

**Third quarter**

- (11:48) LV – Kenyan Drake 4-yard run, (Daniel Carlson kick)
  **Raiders 24–7;** Drive: 6 plays, 41 yards, 3:12.
- (6:15) LV – Bryan Edwards 1-yard pass from Derek Carr, (kick failed)
  **Raiders 30–7;** Drive: 7 plays, 50 yards, 2:46.

**Fourth quarter**

- (11:40) PHI – Boston Scott 1-yard run, (Jake Elliott kick)
  **Raiders 30–14;** Drive: 8 plays, 59 yards, 3:30.
- (7:22) LV – Daniel Carlson 39-yard field goal
  **Raiders 33–14;** Drive: 8 plays, 54 yards, 2:21.
- (3:50) PHI – Jalen Reagor 17-yard pass from Jalen Hurts, (Dallas Goedert–Jalen Hurts pass)
  **Raiders 33–22;** Drive: 8 plays, 75 yards, 3:27.

**Top passers**

- PHI – Jalen Hurts – 18/34, 236 yards, 2 TD
- LV – Derek Carr – 31/34, 323 yards, 2 TD, INT

**Top rushers**

- PHI – Jalen Hurts – 13 rushes, 61 yards
- LV – Josh Jacobs – 14 rushes, 69 yards, TD

**Top receivers**

- PHI – Dallas Goedert – 3 receptions, 70 yards
- LV – Foster Moreau – 6 receptions, 60 yards, TD

==== Week 8: at Detroit Lions ====
Week 8: Philadelphia Eagles at Detroit Lions – Game summary

Quarter	1	2	3	4	Total
**Eagles**	7	10	21	6	**44**
Lions	0	0	0	6	**6**

at Ford Field, Detroit, Michigan

- Date: October 31
- Game time: 1:00 p.m. EDT
- Game weather: None (indoor stadium)
- Game attendance: 47,192
- Referee: Tony Corrente
- TV announcers (Fox): Kenny Albert, Jonathan Vilma and Megan Olivi
- Recap, Game Book

Game information

**First quarter**

- PHI – Boston Scott 1-yard run (Jake Elliott kick), 3:11. Eagles 7–0. **Drive: 10 plays, 63 yards, 5:25.**

**Second quarter**

- PHI – Jake Elliott 43-yard field goal, 12:50. Eagles 10–0. **Drive: 7 plays, 36 yards, 3:13.**
- PHI – Jordan Howard 4-yard run (Jake Elliott kick), 2:51. Eagles 17–0. **Drive: 8 plays, 81 yards, 4:50.**

**Third quarter**

- PHI – Boston Scott 3-yard run (Jake Elliott kick), 9:02. Eagles 24–0. **Drive: 11 plays, 90 yards, 5:58.**
- PHI – Jordan Howard 2-yard run (Jake Elliott kick), 1:20. Eagles 31–0. **Drive: 9 plays, 57 yards, 4:40.**
- PHI – Darius Slay 33-yard fumble recovery (Jake Elliott kick), 1:09. Eagles 38–0.

**Fourth quarter**

- PHI – Jake Elliott 26-yard field goal, 9:53. Eagles 41–0. **Drive: 7 plays, 23 yards, 4:22.**
- DET – Jermar Jefferson 8-yard run (pass failed), 7:14. Eagles 41–6. **Drive: 11 plays, 67 yards, 2:39.**
- PHI – Jake Elliott 41-yard field goal, 1:49. Eagles 44–6. **Drive: 9 plays, 26 yards, 5:25.**

**Top passers**

- PHI – Jalen Hurts – 9/14, 103 yards
- DET – Jared Goff – 25/34, 222 yards

**Top rushers**

- PHI – Jalen Hurts – 7 rushes, 71 yards
- DET – D'Andre Swift – 12 rushes, 27 yards

**Top receivers**

- PHI – Dallas Goedert – 6 receptions, 72 yards
- DET – T. J. Hockenson – 10 receptions, 89 yards

In a newly looking, run heavy offense, the Eagles would rush their way to a 44-6 blowout over the lowly Detroit Lions. The win marks the first time the Eagles win at Ford Field since 2010, as well as their first 40+ point game since Super Bowl LII. With the Win, the Eagles improve to 3-5.

==== Week 9: vs. Los Angeles Chargers ====
Week 9: Los Angeles Chargers at Philadelphia Eagles – Game summary

Quarter	1	2	3	4	Total
**Chargers**	7	0	9	11	**27**
Eagles	0	10	7	7	**24**

at Lincoln Financial Field, Philadelphia, Pennsylvania

- Date: November 7
- Game time: 4:05 p.m. EST/1:05 p.m. PST
- Game weather: Mostly cloudy, 52 °F (11 °C)
- Game attendance: 69,796
- Referee: Jerome Boger
- TV announcers (CBS): Ian Eagle, Charles Davis and Evan Washburn
- Recap, Game Book

Game information

**First quarter**

- LAC – Stephen Anderson 2-yard pass from Justin Herbert (Dustin Hopkins kick), 0:50. Chargers 7–0. **Drive: 6 plays, 38 yards, 3:19.**

**Second quarter**

- PHI – Jordan Howard 4-yard run (Jake Elliott kick), 11:20. Tied 7–7. **Drive: 10 plays, 75 yards, 4:30.**
- PHI – Jake Elliott 24-yard field goal, 0:21. Eagles 10–7. **Drive: 16 plays, 68 yards, 7:04.**

**Third quarter**

- LAC – Dustin Hopkins 30-yard field goal, 10:33. Tied 10–10. **Drive: 9 plays, 57 yards, 4:27.**
- LAC – Donald Parham 8-yard pass from Justin Herbert (kick failed), 6:44. Chargers 16–10. **Drive: 4 plays, 66 yards, 1:56.**
- PHI – Kenneth Gainwell 1-yard run (Jake Elliott kick), 3:10. Eagles 17–16. **Drive: 10 plays, 85 yards, 3:34.**

**Fourth quarter**

- LAC – Justin Herbert 8-yard run (Justin Herbert-Jared Cook pass), 11:32. Chargers 24–17. **Drive: 10 plays, 61 yards, 6:38.**
- PHI – DeVonta Smith 28-yard pass from Jalen Hurts (Jake Elliott kick), 6:07. Tied 24–24. **Drive: 10 plays, 78 yards, 5:25.**
- LAC – Dustin Hopkins 29-yard field goal, 0:02. Chargers 27–24. **Drive: 15 plays, 64 yards, 6:05.**

**Top passers**

- LAC – Justin Herbert – 32/38, 356 yards, 2 TD
- PHI – Jalen Hurts – 11/17, 162 yards, TD

**Top rushers**

- LAC – Austin Ekeler – 17 rushes, 59 yards
- PHI – Jordan Howard – 17 rushes, 71 yards, TD

**Top receivers**

- LAC – Keenan Allen – 12 receptions, 104 yards
- PHI – DeVonta Smith – 5 receptions, 116 yards, TD

==== Week 10: at Denver Broncos ====
Week 10: Philadelphia Eagles at Denver Broncos – Game summary

Quarter	1	2	3	4	Total
**Eagles**	10	10	7	3	**30**
Broncos	0	10	3	0	**13**

at Empower Field at Mile High, Denver, Colorado

- Date: November 14
- Game time: 4:25 p.m. EST/2:25 p.m. MST
- Game weather: Partly cloudy, 65 °F (18 °C)
- Game attendance: 76,766
- Referee: Shawn Hochuli
- TV announcers (CBS): Greg Gumbel, Adam Archuleta and AJ Ross
- Recap, Game Book

Game information

**First quarter**

- PHI – Jake Elliott 30-yard field goal, 10:13. Eagles 3–0. **Drive: 10 plays, 63 yards, 4:47.**
- PHI – DeVonta Smith 36-yard pass from Jalen Hurts (Jake Elliott kick), 3:16. Eagles 10–0. **Drive: 9 plays, 80 yards, 5:27.**

**Second quarter**

- DEN – Melvin Gordon 1-yard run (Brandon McManus kick), 13:38. Eagles 10–7. **Drive: 9 plays, 75 yards, 4:38.**
- DEN – Brandon McManus 21-yard field goal, 9:39. Tied 10–10. **Drive: 5 plays, 69 yards, 1:47.**
- PHI – DeVonta Smith 5-yard pass from Jalen Hurts (Jake Elliott kick), 3:07. Eagles 17–10. **Drive: 12 plays, 75 yards, 6:32.**
- PHI – Jake Elliott 52-yard field goal, 0:05. Eagles 20–10. **Drive: 9 plays, 51 yards, 1:44.**

**Third quarter**

- DEN – Brandon McManus 28-yard field goal, 4:51. Eagles 20–13. **Drive: 10 plays, 35 yards, 4:10.**
- PHI – Darius Slay 83-yard fumble return (Jake Elliott kick), 0:00. Eagles 27–13.

**Fourth quarter**

- PHI – Jake Elliott 23-yard field goal, 7:36. Eagles 30–13. **Drive: 10 plays, 60 yards, 5:57.**

**Top passers**

- PHI – Jalen Hurts – 16/23, 178 yards, 2 TD, INT
- DEN – Teddy Bridgewater – 22/36, 226 yards

**Top rushers**

- PHI – Jordan Howard – 12 rushes, 83 yards
- DEN – Javonte Williams – 8 rushes, 48 yards

**Top receivers**

- PHI – DeVonta Smith – 4 receptions, 66 yards, 2 TD
- DEN – Albert Okwuegbunam – 3 receptions, 77 yards

Going into Denver, the Eagles introduced their white jersey on black pants. With the win, the Eagles earn their first win in Denver since 1989 and matched their 2020 win total.

==== Week 11: vs. New Orleans Saints ====
Week 11: New Orleans Saints at Philadelphia Eagles – Game summary

Quarter	1	2	3	4	Total
Saints	0	7	0	22	**29**
**Eagles**	14	13	6	7	**40**

at Lincoln Financial Field, Philadelphia, Pennsylvania

- Date: November 21
- Game time: 1:00 p.m. EST
- Game weather: Mostly cloudy, 52 °F (11 °C)
- Game attendance: 69,796
- Referee: Scott Novak
- TV announcers (Fox): Adam Amin, Mark Schlereth and Shannon Spake
- Recap, Game Book

Game information

**First quarter**

- PHI – Jalen Hurts 1-yard run (Jake Elliott kick), 7:17. Eagles 7–0. **Drive: 7 plays, 39 yards, 2:20.**
- PHI – Jalen Hurts 3-yard run (Jake Elliott kick), 2:02. Eagles 14–0. **Drive: 7 plays, 58 yards, 3:52.**

**Second quarter**

- NO – Adam Trautman 18-yard pass from Trevor Siemian (Brett Maher kick), 13:01. Eagles 14–7. **Drive: 3 plays, 6 yards, 0:59.**
- PHI – Jake Elliott 50-yard field goal, 9:27. Eagles 17–7. **Drive: 7 plays, 43 yards, 3:34.**
- PHI – Jake Elliott 37-yard field goal, 4:20. Eagles 20–7. **Drive: 11 plays, 56 yards, 4:13.**
- PHI – Darius Slay 51-yard interception return (Jake Elliott kick), 0:24. Eagles 27–7.

**Third quarter**

- PHI – Jake Elliott 33-yard field goal, 5:57. Eagles 30–7. **Drive: 8 plays, 25 yards, 4:51.**
- PHI – Jake Elliott 47-yard field goal, 2:38. Eagles 33–7. **Drive: 5 plays, 12 yards, 2:42.**

**Fourth quarter**

- NO – Marquez Callaway 26-yard pass from Trevor Siemian (pass failed), 14:49. Eagles 33–13. **Drive: 7 plays, 75 yards, 2:49.**
- NO – Trevor Siemian 17-yard run (kick failed), 12:33. Eagles 33–19. **Drive: 3 plays, 39 yards, 1:12.**
- NO – Brett Maher 28-yard field goal, 7:14. Eagles 33–22. **Drive: 8 plays, 39 yards, 3:38.**
- PHI – Jalen Hurts 24-yard run (Jake Elliott kick), 3:59. Eagles 40–22. **Drive: 9 plays, 74 yards, 3:15.**
- NO – Lil'Jordan Humphrey 4-yard pass from Trevor Siemian (Brett Maher kick), 0:45. Eagles 40–29. **Drive: 11 plays, 75 yards, 3:14.**

**Top passers**

- NO – Trevor Siemian – 22/40, 214 yards, 3 TD, 2 INT
- PHI – Jalen Hurts – 13/24, 147 yards

**Top rushers**

- NO – Mark Ingram II – 16 rushes, 88 yards
- PHI – Miles Sanders – 16 rushes, 94 yards

**Top receivers**

- NO – Tre'Quan Smith – 5 receptions, 64 yards
- PHI – Dallas Goedert – 5 receptions, 62 yards

The Eagles survived a late rally by the Saints to earn their first home win since Week 14 of the 2020 season, which coincidentally also came against New Orleans. Philadelphia improved to 5–6 on the season with the 40-29 win, improving on their win total from the previous season.

==== Week 12: at New York Giants ====
Week 12: Philadelphia Eagles at New York Giants – Game summary

Quarter	1	2	3	4	Total
Eagles	0	0	0	7	**7**
**Giants**	3	0	7	3	**13**

at MetLife Stadium, East Rutherford, New Jersey

- Date: November 28
- Game time: 1:00 p.m. EST
- Game weather: Overcast, 36 °F (2 °C)
- Game attendance: 73,969
- Referee: Ronald Torbert
- TV announcers (Fox): Adam Amin, Mark Schlereth and Shannon Spake
- Recap, Game Book

Game information

**First quarter**

- NYG – Graham Gano 35-yard field goal, 6:44. Giants 3–0. **Drive: 11 plays, 47 yards, 5:23.**

**Second quarter**

- No scoring plays.

**Third quarter**

- NYG – Chris Myarick 1-yard pass from Daniel Jones (Graham Gano kick), 6:50. Giants 10–0. **Drive: 10 plays, 59 yards, 5:58.**

**Fourth quarter**

- PHI – Boston Scott 1-yard run (Jake Elliott kick), 14:55. Giants 10–7. **Drive: 10 plays, 66 yards, 4:38.**
- NYG – Graham Gano 39-yard field goal, 2:54. Giants 13–7. **Drive: 12 plays, 70 yards, 7:22.**

**Top passers**

- PHI – Jalen Hurts – 14/31, 129 yards, 3 INT
- NYG – Daniel Jones – 19/30, 202 yards, TD

**Top rushers**

- PHI – Jalen Hurts – 8 rushes, 77 yards
- NYG – Saquon Barkley – 13 rushes, 40 yards

**Top receivers**

- PHI – Kenneth Gainwell – 3 receptions, 32 yards
- NYG – Kenny Golladay – 3 receptions, 50 yards

Hurts played poorly throughout the game, throwing 3 interceptions. On the Eagles' final two plays, Jalen Reagor dropped two passes at the goal line, securing their defeat.

With the loss, the Eagles 2-game winning streak was snapped as they fell to 5–7, and lost back-to-back games against the Giants for the first time since 2007-08.

==== Week 13: at New York Jets ====
Week 13: Philadelphia Eagles at New York Jets – Game summary

Quarter	1	2	3	4	Total
**Eagles**	7	17	3	6	**33**
Jets	12	6	0	0	**18**

at MetLife Stadium, East Rutherford, New Jersey

- Date: December 5
- Game time: 1:00 p.m. EST
- Game weather: Mostly sunny, 47 °F (8 °C)
- Game attendance: 73,311
- Referee: Clay Martin
- TV announcers (CBS): Andrew Catalon, James Lofton and Amanda Balionis
- Recap, Game Book

Game information

**First quarter**

- NYJ – Elijah Moore 3-yard pass from Zach Wilson (kick failed), 12:42. Jets 6–0. **Drive: 5 plays, 21 yards, 2:18.**
- PHI – Dallas Goedert 36-yard pass from Gardner Minshew (Jake Elliott kick), 9:25. Eagles 7–6. **Drive: 6 plays, 75 yards, 3:17.**
- NYJ – Zach Wilson 1-yard run (kick failed), 3:18. Jets 12–7. **Drive: 11 plays, 68 yards, 6:07.**

**Second quarter**

- PHI – Dallas Goedert 25-yard pass from Gardner Minshew (Jake Elliott kick), 14:12. Eagles 14–12. **Drive: 8 plays, 69 yards, 4:06.**
- NYJ – Ryan Griffin 1-yard pass from Zach Wilson (pass failed), 9:22. Jets 18–14. **Drive: 9 plays, 75 yards, 4:50.**
- PHI – Kenneth Gainwell 18-yard run (Jake Elliott kick), 4:30. Eagles 21–18. **Drive: 8 plays, 94 yards, 4:52.**
- PHI – Jake Elliott 31-yard field goal, 0:19. Eagles 24–18. **Drive: 10 plays, 34 yards, 1:51.**

**Third quarter**

- PHI – Jake Elliott 32-yard field goal, 6:38. Eagles 27–18. **Drive: 14 plays, 70 yards, 8:22.**

**Fourth quarter**

- PHI – Jake Elliott 43-yard field goal, 14:15. Eagles 30–18. **Drive: 13 plays, 41 yards, 6:13.**
- PHI – Jake Elliott 46-yard field goal, 9:42. Eagles 33–18. **Drive: 6 plays, 48 yards, 3:20.**

**Top passers**

- PHI – Gardner Minshew – 20/25, 242 yards, 2 TD
- NYJ – Zach Wilson – 23/38, 226 yards, 2 TD, INT

**Top rushers**

- PHI – Miles Sanders – 24 rushes, 120 yards
- NYJ – Tevin Coleman – 11 rushes, 58 yards

**Top receivers**

- PHI – Dallas Goedert – 6 receptions, 105 yards, 2 TD
- NYJ – Elijah Moore – 6 receptions, 77 yards, TD

Thanks to a stellar performance by backup quarterback Gardner Minshew, the Eagles improved to 12–0 in their all-time series against the New York Jets.

==== Week 15: vs. Washington Football Team ====
Week 15: Washington Football Team at Philadelphia Eagles – Game summary

Quarter	1	2	3	4	Total
Washington	10	0	0	7	**17**
**Eagles**	0	10	10	7	**27**

at Lincoln Financial Field, Philadelphia, Pennsylvania

- Date: December 21
- Game time: 7:00 p.m. EST
- Game weather: Cloudy, 38 °F (3 °C)
- Game attendance: 69,796
- Referee: Tony Corrente
- TV announcers (Fox): Kevin Kugler, Mark Sanchez and Laura Okmin
- Recap, Game Book

Game information

**First quarter**

- WAS – Antonio Gibson 1-yard run (Brian Johnson kick), 8:15. Football Team 7–0 **Drive: 7 plays, 26 yards, 3:14.**
- WAS – Brian Johnson 22-yard field goal, 2:47. Football Team 10–0 **Drive: 5 plays, 49 yards, 1:38.**

**Second quarter**

- PHI – Jake Elliott 20-yard field goal, 8:07. Football Team 10–3 **Drive: 8 plays, 75 yards, 3:23.**
- PHI – Jalen Hurts 1-yard run (Jake Elliott kick), 1:29. Tied 10–10 **Drive: 11 plays, 77 yards, 4:50.**

**Third quarter**

- PHI – Jalen Hurts 1-yard run (Jake Elliott kick), 12:26. Eagles 17–10 **Drive: 6 plays, 75 yards, 2:34.**
- PHI – Jake Elliott 37-yard field goal, 0:18. Eagles 20–10 **Drive: 10 plays, 44 yards, 5:53.**

**Fourth quarter**

- WAS – Jaret Patterson 1-yard run (Brian Johnson kick), 11:44. Eagles 20–17 **Drive: 7 plays, 69 yards, 3:34.**
- PHI – Greg Ward 19-yard pass from Jalen Hurts (Jake Elliott kick), 7:46. Eagles 27–17 **Drive: 8 plays, 80 yards, 3:58.**

**Top passers**

- WAS – Garrett Gilbert – 20/31, 194 yards
- PHI – Jalen Hurts – 20/26, 296 yards, TD, INT

**Top rushers**

- WAS – Antonio Gibson – 15 rushes, 26 yards, TD
- PHI – Miles Sanders – 18 rushes, 131 yards

**Top receivers**

- WAS – Terry McLaurin – 2 receptions, 51 yards
- PHI – Dallas Goedert – 7 receptions, 135 yards

In the week leading up to the game, a COVID-19 outbreak among the Washington Football Team led to postponement of the game originally scheduled for December 19. The game was moved to Tuesday night. On the rare Tuesday Night Football, Washington got off to a quick start after a pair of Eagles turnovers starting from a flukey interception bouncing off of Dallas Goedert's foot to a Jalen Hurts' fumble. From the second quarter on, the Eagles would score 20 unanswered points before surrendering a Washington TD. A late back shoulder throw from Jalen Hurts to Greg Ward would secure the Eagles' victory. This is the first divisional win in the Hurts/Sirianni era and a win that keeps the Eagles alive in the playoff push.

==== Week 16: vs. New York Giants ====
Week 16: New York Giants at Philadelphia Eagles – Game summary

Quarter	1	2	3	4	Total
Giants	0	3	0	7	**10**
**Eagles**	0	3	17	14	**34**

at Lincoln Financial Field, Philadelphia, Pennsylvania

- Date: December 26
- Game time: 1:00 p.m. EST
- Game weather: Clear, 50 °F (10 °C)
- Game attendance: 69,796
- Referee: Land Clark
- TV announcers (Fox): Kenny Albert, Jonathan Vilma and Sara Walsh
- Recap, Game Book

Game information

**First quarter**

- No scoring plays.

**Second quarter**

- NYG – Graham Gano 54-yard field goal, 11:41. Giants 3–0. **Drive: 11 plays, 39 yards, 4:43.**
- PHI – Jake Elliott 22-yard field goal, 1:57. Tied 3–3. **Drive: 7 plays, 56 yards, 2:53.**

**Third quarter**

- PHI – Boston Scott 3-yard run (Jake Elliott kick), 12:02. Eagles 10–3. **Drive: 5 plays, 21 yards, 2:08.**
- PHI – Jake Elliott 37-yard field goal, 7:48. Eagles 13–3. **Drive: 4 plays, 2 yards, 1:59.**
- PHI – DeVonta Smith 4-yard pass from Jalen Hurts (Jake Elliott kick), 4:07. Eagles 20–3. **Drive: 5 plays, 57 yards, 2:46.**

**Fourth quarter**

- PHI – Lane Johnson 5-yard pass from Jalen Hurts (Jake Elliott kick), 11:40. Eagles 27–3. **Drive: 10 plays, 75 yards, 5:26.**
- PHI – Alex Singleton 29-yard interception return (Jake Elliott kick), 10:19. Eagles 34–3.
- NYG – Evan Engram 9-yard pass from Mike Glennon (Graham Gano kick), 3:50. Eagles 34–10. **Drive: 17 plays, 75 yards, 6:29.**

**Top passers**

- NYG – Mike Glennon – 17/27, 93 yards, TD, INT
- PHI – Jalen Hurts – 17/29, 199 yards, 2 TD

**Top rushers**

- NYG – Saquon Barkley – 15 rushes, 32 yards
- PHI – Miles Sanders – 7 rushes, 45 yards

**Top receivers**

- NYG – Kadarius Toney – 4 receptions, 28 yards
- PHI – DeVonta Smith – 5 receptions, 80 yards, TD

Despite a slow start, the Eagles rallied with 31 second-half points in a 34-10 rout of the shorthanded New York Giants, including a touchdown catch by Lane Johnson and a pick-six by Alex Singleton. This win was Philadelphia's eighth straight home win and 90th overall win over their rivals.

==== Week 17: at Washington Football Team ====
Week 17: Philadelphia Eagles at Washington Football Team – Game summary

Quarter	1	2	3	4	Total
**Eagles**	0	7	7	6	**20**
Washington	10	6	0	0	**16**

at FedExField, Landover, Maryland

- Date: January 2
- Game time: 1:00 p.m. EST
- Game weather: Cloudy, 60 °F (16 °C)
- Game attendance: 51,563
- Referee: Clete Blakeman
- TV announcers (Fox): Aaron Goldsmith, Mark Schlereth and Shannon Spake
- Recap, Game Book

Game information

**First quarter**

- WAS – Jaret Patterson 11-yard run (Joey Slye kick), 11:54. Football Team 7–0. **Drive: 6 plays, 67 yards, 3:06.**
- WAS – Joey Slye 31-yard field goal, 2:00. Football Team 10–0. **Drive: 9 plays, 63 yards, 4:58.**

**Second quarter**

- PHI – Boston Scott 2-yard run (Jake Elliott kick), 11:49. Football Team 10–7. **Drive: 11 plays, 80 yards, 5:11.**
- WAS – Joey Slye 39-yard field goal, 5:36. Football Team 13–7. **Drive: 11 plays, 54 yards, 6:13.**
- WAS – Joey Slye 55-yard field goal, 0:01. Football Team 16–7. **Drive: 11 plays, 57 yards, 2:05.**

**Third quarter**

- PHI – Boston Scott 1-yard run (Jake Elliott kick), 7:21. Football Team 16–14. **Drive: 14 plays, 75 yards, 7:39.**

**Fourth quarter**

- PHI – Jake Elliott 42-yard field goal, 11:41. Eagles 17–16. **Drive: 9 plays, 33 yards, 4:08.**
- PHI – Jake Elliott 41-yard field goal, 2:21. Eagles 20–16. **Drive: 10 plays, 28 yards, 5:10.**

**Top passers**

- PHI – Jalen Hurts – 17/26, 214 yards
- WAS – Taylor Heinicke – 27/36, 247 yards, INT

**Top rushers**

- PHI – Boston Scott – 14 rushes, 47 yards,2 TD
- WAS – Jaret Patterson – 12 rushes, 57 yards, TD

**Top receivers**

- PHI – Dallas Goedert – 6 receptions, 71 yards
- WAS – Terry McLaurin – 7 receptions, 61 yards

Despite again playing less-than-stellar football to start the game, the Eagles rallied for their fourth straight win, improving to 9-7 on the year and earning their first winning season and playoff appearance since 2019, thanks to wins by the San Francisco 49ers and Green Bay Packers later that day. This was also Philadelphia's first sweep of Washington since that same season, and their fourth in their past five seasons.

==== Week 18: vs. Dallas Cowboys ====
Week 18: Dallas Cowboys at Philadelphia Eagles – Game summary

Quarter	1	2	3	4	Total
**Cowboys**	10	20	0	21	**51**
Eagles	7	10	3	6	**26**

at Lincoln Financial Field, Philadelphia, Pennsylvania

- Date: January 8
- Game time: 8:15 p.m. EST
- Game weather: Clear, 26 °F (−3 °C)
- Game attendance: 69,796
- Referee: Ronald Torbert
- TV announcers (ESPN/ABC/ESPN+): Steve Levy, Brian Griese, Louis Riddick, Lisa Salters, and John Parry
- Recap, Game Book

Game information

**First quarter**

- PHI – Tyree Jackson 3-yard pass from Gardner Minshew (Jake Elliott kick), 9:41. Eagles 7–0. **Drive: 11 plays, 75 yards, 5:19.**
- DAL – Cedrick Wilson Jr. 14-yard pass from Dak Prescott (Greg Zuerlein kick), 5:08. Tied 7–7. **Drive: 10 plays, 75 yards, 4:33.**
- DAL – Greg Zuerlein 48-yard field goal, 1:37. Cowboys 10–7. **Drive: 5 plays, 26 yards, 1:57.**

**Second quarter**

- PHI – Jake Elliott 38-yard field goal, 12:24. Tied 10–10. **Drive: 10 plays, 44 yards, 4:13.**
- DAL – Cedrick Wilson Jr. 24-yard pass from Dak Prescott (Greg Zuerlein kick), 8:07. Cowboys 17–10. **Drive: 7 plays, 74 yards, 4:17.**
- PHI – Kenneth Gainwell 7-yard run (Jake Elliott kick), 3:40. Tied 17–17. **Drive: 10 plays, 75 yards, 4:27.**
- DAL – Dalton Schultz 2-yard pass from Dak Prescott (kick failed), 1:45. Cowboys 23–17. **Drive: 8 plays, 75 yards, 1:55.**
- DAL – Dalton Schultz 9-yard pass from Dak Prescott (Greg Zuerlein kick), 0:05. Cowboys 30–17. **Drive: 4 plays, 43 yards, 0:19.**

**Third quarter**

- PHI – Jake Elliott 40-yard field goal, 5:58. Cowboys 30–20. **Drive: 15 plays, 53 yards, 6:41.**

**Fourth quarter**

- DAL – Corey Clement 8-yard pass from Dak Prescott (Greg Zuerlein kick), 14:33. Cowboys 37–20. **Drive: 14 plays, 84 yards, 6:25.**
- DAL – Ito Smith 4-yard run (Greg Zuerlein kick), 10:16. Cowboys 44–20. **Drive: 5 plays, 52 yards, 2:28.**
- DAL – JaQuan Hardy 22-yard run (Greg Zuerlein kick), 8:36. Cowboys 51–20. **Drive: 3 plays, 26 yards, 1:32.**
- PHI – Quez Watkins 36-yard pass from Gardner Minshew (pass failed), 1:50. Cowboys 51–26. **Drive: 14 plays, 75 yards, 6:46.**

**Top passers**

- DAL – Dak Prescott – 21/27, 295 yards, 5 TD
- PHI – Gardner Minshew – 19/33, 186 yards, 2 TD, INT

**Top rushers**

- DAL – Ezekiel Elliott – 18 rushes, 87 yards
- PHI – Kenneth Gainwell – 12 rushes, 78 yards, TD

**Top receivers**

- DAL – Cedrick Wilson Jr. – 5 receptions, 119 yards, 2 TD
- PHI – Quez Watkins – 5 receptions, 84 yards, TD

With a playoff spot already clinched, the Eagles rested Jalen Hurts, who was nursing an ankle injury, and most other key starters in the season finale. The Cowboys, who played nearly all of their key starters, had an offensive attack that was too powerful for the Eagles' backups to handle. The 51–26 loss ended the Eagles' regular season with a 9–8 record, and the 51 points were the most the Eagles surrendered in a single game at Lincoln Financial Field, surpassing the previous mark of 48 against the New Orleans Saints in 2009. Following the San Francisco 49ers' win the following day, the Eagles were locked into the No. 7 seed.

=== Standings ===
==== Division ====
NFC East
	W	L	T	PCT	DIV	CONF	PF	PA	STK
^{(3)} Dallas Cowboys	12	5	0	.706	6–0	10–2	530	358	W1
^{(7)} Philadelphia Eagles	9	8	0	.529	3–3	7–5	444	385	L1
Washington Football Team	7	10	0	.412	2–4	6–6	335	434	W1
New York Giants	4	13	0	.235	1–5	3–9	258	416	L6

==== Conference ====
NFC
#	Team	Division	W	L	T	PCT	DIV	CONF	SOS	SOV	STK
**Division winners**
1 (Note: Green Bay finished ahead of Tampa Bay based on conference record (9–3 vs. 8–4), claiming the No. 1 seed.)	Green Bay Packers	North	13	4	0	.765	4–2	9–3	.479	.480	L1
2	Tampa Bay Buccaneers	South	13	4	0	.765	4–2	8–4	.467	.443	W3
3 (Note: Dallas claimed the No. 3 seed over LA Rams based on conference record (10–2 vs. 8–4).)	Dallas Cowboys	East	12	5	0	.706	6–0	10–2	.488	.431	W1
4	Los Angeles Rams	West	12	5	0	.706	3–3	8–4	.483	.409	L1
**Wild cards**
5	Arizona Cardinals	West	11	6	0	.647	4–2	7–5	.490	.492	L1
6	San Francisco 49ers	West	10	7	0	.588	2–4	7–5	.500	.438	W2
7 (Note: Philadelphia finished ahead of New Orleans based on head-to-head victory, claiming the 7th and final playoff spot.)	Philadelphia Eagles	East	9	8	0	.529	3–3	7–5	.469	.350	L1
**Did not qualify for the postseason**
8	New Orleans Saints	South	9	8	0	.529	4–2	7–5	.512	.516	W2
9	Minnesota Vikings	North	8	9	0	.471	4–2	6–6	.507	.434	W1
10 (Note: Washington finished ahead of Atlanta and Seattle based on head-to-head victories.)	Washington Football Team	East	7	10	0	.412	2–4	6–6	.529	.420	W1
11 (Note: Seattle finished ahead of Atlanta based on win percentage in common games (4–2 vs. 3–3 against: San Francisco, New Orleans, Jacksonville, Washington, and Detroit).)	Seattle Seahawks	West	7	10	0	.412	3–3	4–8	.519	.424	W2
12	Atlanta Falcons	South	7	10	0	.412	2–4	4–8	.472	.315	L2
13	Chicago Bears	North	6	11	0	.353	2–4	4–8	.524	.373	L1
14	Carolina Panthers	South	5	12	0	.294	2–4	3–9	.509	.412	L7
15	New York Giants	East	4	13	0	.235	1–5	3–9	.536	.485	L6
16	Detroit Lions	North	3	13	1	.206	2–4	3–9	.528	.627	W1
**Tiebreakers** (Note: When breaking ties for three or more teams under the NFL's rules, they are first broken within divisions, then comparing only the highest-ranked remaining team from each division.)

== Postseason ==
Round	Date	Opponent (seed)	Result	Record	Venue	Recap
Wild Card	January 16	at Tampa Bay Buccaneers (2)	L 15–31	0–1	Raymond James Stadium	Recap

=== Game summaries ===
==== NFC Wild Card Playoffs: at (2) Tampa Bay Buccaneers ====
NFC Wild Card Playoffs: (7) Philadelphia Eagles at (2) Tampa Bay Buccaneers – Game summary

Quarter	1	2	3	4	Total
Eagles	0	0	0	15	15
Buccaneers	14	3	14	0	31

at Raymond James Stadium, Tampa, Florida

- Date: January 16, 2022
- Game time: 1:00 p.m. EST
- Game weather: Cloudy, 65 °F (18 °C)
- Game attendance: 65,077
- Referee: Craig Wrolstad
- TV announcers (Fox): Joe Buck, Troy Aikman, Erin Andrews, and Tom Rinaldi
- Recap, Game Book

Game information

First quarter

- TB – Giovani Bernard 2-yard run (Ryan Succop kick), 10:00. Buccaneers 7–0. Drive: 12 plays, 75 yards, 5:00.
- TB – Ke'Shawn Vaughn 1-yard run (Ryan Succop kick), 0:25. Buccaneers 14–0. Drive: 10 plays, 70 yards, 4:00.

Second quarter

- TB – Ryan Succop 34-yard field goal, 9:16. Buccaneers 17–0. Drive: 11 plays, 53 yards, 4:52.

Third quarter

- TB – Rob Gronkowski 2-yard pass from Tom Brady (Ryan Succop kick), 7:38. Buccaneers 24–0. Drive: 5 plays, 48 yards, 2:57.
- TB – Mike Evans 36-yard pass from Tom Brady (Ryan Succop kick), 5:18. Buccaneers 31–0. Drive: 1 play, 36 yards, 0:07.

Fourth quarter

- PHI – Boston Scott 34-yard run (Jake Elliott kick), 12:08. Buccaneers 31–7. Drive: 2 plays, 65 yards, 0:40.
- PHI – Kenneth Gainwell 16-yard pass from Jalen Hurts (Jalen Hurts–DeVonta Smith pass), 4:45. Buccaneers 31–15. Drive: 10 plays, 93 yards, 4:16.

Top passers

- PHI – Jalen Hurts – 23/43, 258 yards, TD, 2 INT
- TB – Tom Brady – 29/37, 271 yards, 2 TD

Top rushers

- PHI – Jalen Hurts – 8 rushes, 39 yards
- TB – Ke'Shawn Vaughn – 17 rushes, 53 yards, TD

Top receivers

- PHI – Dallas Goedert – 6 receptions, 92 yards
- TB – Mike Evans – 9 receptions, 117 yards, TD

The Eagles travelled to take on the #2 seed and defending Super Bowl champion Tampa Bay Buccaneers. Tampa Bay would jump out to an early lead and never look back in a 31–15 rout of Philadelphia. The game would mark the first career playoff appearances for Eagles head coach Nick Sirianni and quarterback Jalen Hurts, and would be the final playoff victory for Tampa Bay quarterback Tom Brady.

Brady marched the Bucs to two first quarter touchdown drives, while Hurts struggled to move the ball against the Tampa defense. A Ryan Succop 34-yard field goal early in the second quarter pushed the Tampa lead to 17–0. Trying to get the Eagles back into the game, Hurts drove the offense to the Tampa 21-yard line late in the half, but a pass intended for DeVonta Smith was intercepted in the end zone. The Eagles defense stopped the Bucs on their first drive of the third quarter, but Jalen Reagor muffed the punt, and Brady turned the opportunity into short touchdown pass to Rob Gronkowski. Hurts was intercepted again on the ensuing drive, and Brady laced a 36-yard touchdown pass to Mike Evans on the next play to it 31–0 Bucs. Early in the fourth quarter, Smith gained 31 yards on a catch-and-run, and Boston Scott scampered 34 yards for a touchdown on the following play to get the Eagles on the board. Hurts completed a 14-yard touchdown to rookie Kenneth Gainwell on the next drive, then found Smith for a successful 2-point conversion to close the scoring at 31–15.

Tampa boasted after the game that Hurts was unable to read their defense. He finished with 258 yards passing with one touchdown and two interceptions. Dallas Goedert caught six passes for 92 yards, while defensive end Ryan Kerrigan, coming off a disappointing season for the Eagles and playing in his last game as a professional, tallied 1.5 sacks of Brady.

== Statistics ==
=== Team ===
Category	Total yards	Yards per game	NFL rank (out of 32)
Passing offense	3,404	200.2	25th
Rushing offense	2,715	159.7	1st
Total offense	6,119	359.9	14th
Passing defense	3,756	220.9	11th
Rushing defense	1,834	107.9	9th
Total defense	5,590	328.8	10th

=== Individual ===
Category	Player	Total yards
Offense
Passing	Jalen Hurts	3,144
Rushing	Jalen Hurts	784
Receiving	DeVonta Smith	916
Defense
Tackles (Solo)	Alex Singleton	81
Sacks	Javon Hargrave	7.5
Interceptions	Darius Slay	3

Statistics correct as of the end of the 2021 NFL season
