= Avonte Maddox =

American football player (born 1996)

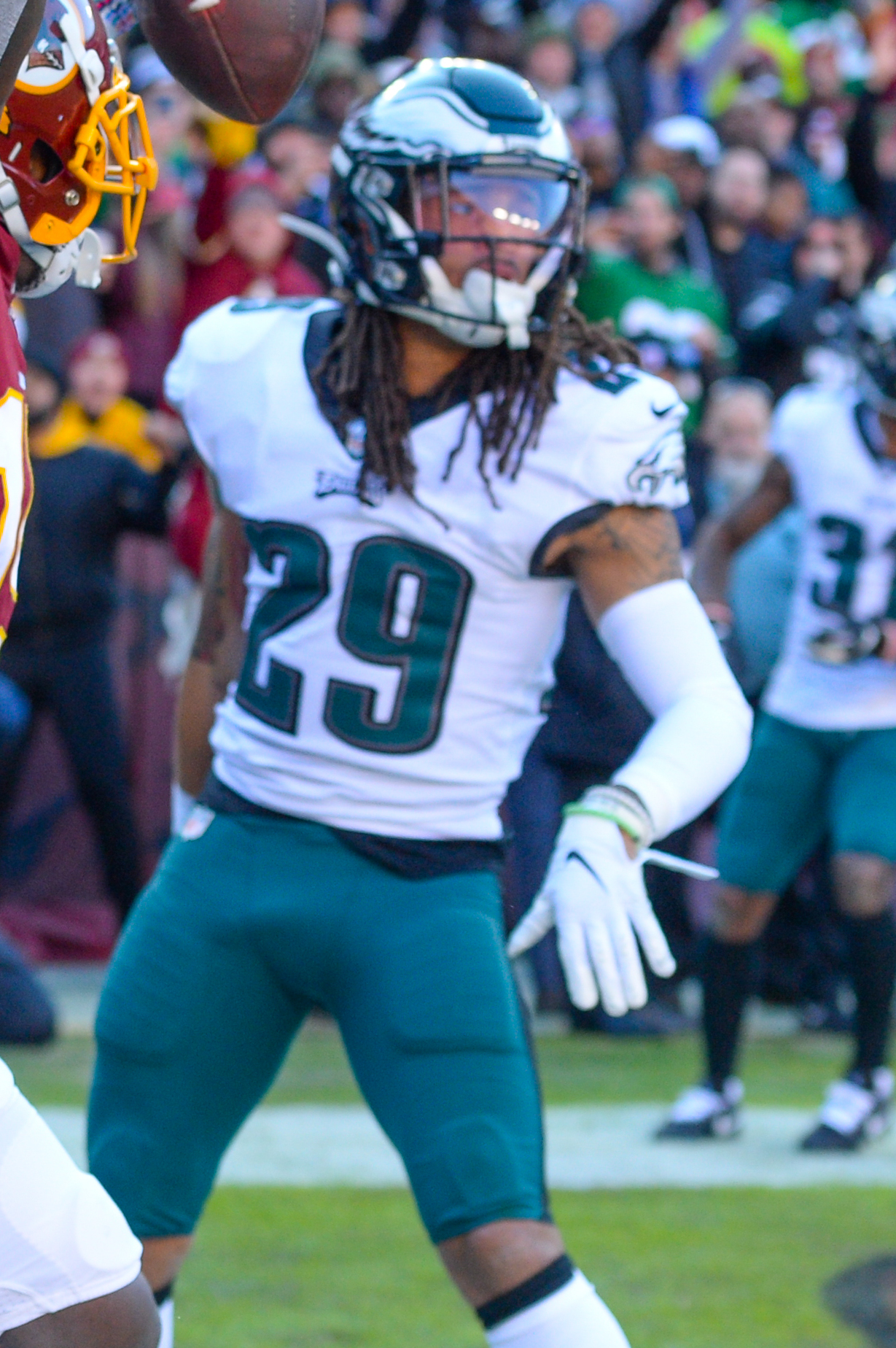
- Maddox with the Philadelphia Eagles in 2019

No. 29 – Detroit Lions
- Position: Safety
- Roster status: Injured reserve

Personal information
- Born: March 31, 1996 (age 30); Detroit, Michigan, U.S.
- Listed height: 5 ft 9 in (1.75 m)
- Listed weight: 191 lb (87 kg)

Career information
- High school: Martin Luther King (Detroit)
- College: Pittsburgh (2014–2017)
- NFL draft: 2018: 4th round, 125th overall pick

Career history
- Philadelphia Eagles (2018–2024); Detroit Lions (2025–present)

Awards and highlights
- Super Bowl champion (LIX); Second-team All-ACC (2017)

Career NFL statistics as of 2026
- Total tackles: 312
- Sacks: 3.0
- Forced fumbles: 9
- Fumble recoveries: 1
- Interceptions: 5
- Pass deflections: 42
- Stats at Pro Football Reference

Avonte Michael Maddox (born March 31, 1996) is an American professional football safety for the Detroit Lions of the National Football League (NFL). He played college football for the Pittsburgh Panthers.

== Early life ==
After playing little league football, Maddox focused on baseball his first two years of high school before switching to football. He received only two Power Five scholarship offers, one from Purdue and one from Pittsburgh. He was also nearly drafted into the MLB after his senior year of high school.

== College career ==
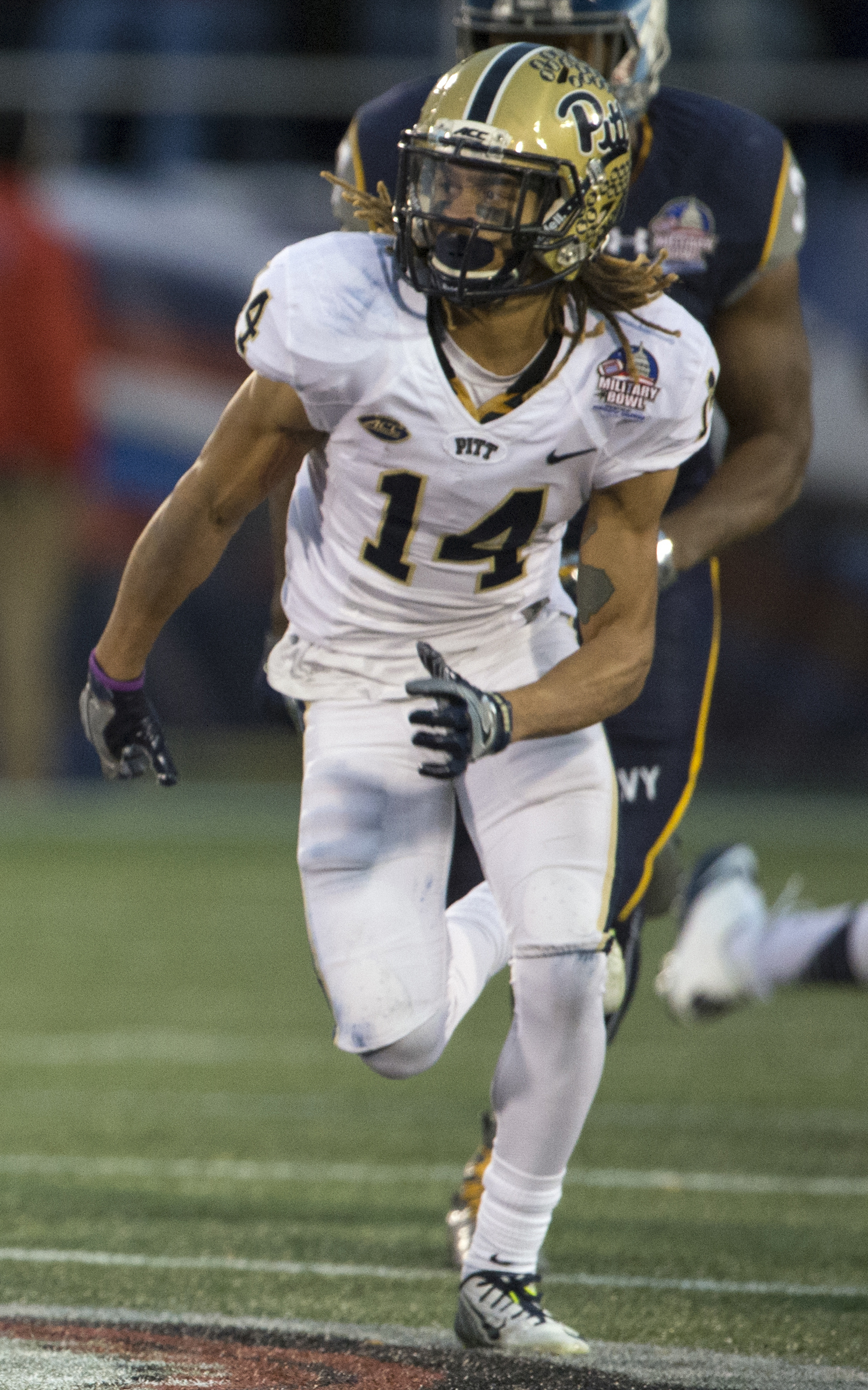
Maddox with Pitt at the 2015 Military Bowl

Maddox started at cornerback all four years at Pitt. He was named Honorable Mention All-Atlantic Coast Conference his sophomore year and Second-team his senior year. Maddox missed two games in both his junior and senior years due to injury.

=== College statistics ===
Season				Tackles					Interceptions					Fumbles			
Year	School	Class	G	Solo	Ast	Tot	Loss	Sk	Int	Yds	Avg	TD	PD	FR	Yds	TD	FF
2014	Pitt	FR	11	26	6	32	0.0	0.0	0	0	–	0	3	0	0	0	0
2015	Pitt	SO	13	52	23	75	1.0	0.5	3	30	10.0	1	12	0	0	0	0
2016	Pitt	JR	10	38	11	49	8.5	2.5	3	33	11.0	1	8	0	0	0	0
2017	Pitt	SR	9	20	7	27	4.0	4.0	2	0	0.0	0	11	1	0	0	3
Career	Pitt		43	136	47	183	13.5	7.0	8	63	7.9	2	34	1	0	0	3

== Professional career ==
Pre-draft measurables
Height	Weight	Arm length	Hand span	Wingspan	40-yard dash	10-yard split	20-yard split	20-yard shuttle	Three-cone drill	Vertical jump	Broad jump	Bench press
5 ft 9 1/8 in (1.76 m)	184 lb (83 kg)	29 1/2 in (0.75 m)	8 3/4 in (0.22 m)	5 ft 11 3/8 in (1.81 m)	4.39 s	1.47 s	2.55 s	4.00 s	6.51 s	37.0 in (0.94 m)	10 ft 5 in (3.18 m)	13 reps
All values from NFL Combine

=== Philadelphia Eagles ===
Maddox was selected by the Philadelphia Eagles in the fourth round (125th overall) of the 2018 NFL draft. He made his NFL debut during the league season opener on September 6, 2018, against the Atlanta Falcons, playing on special teams. Maddox recorded his first career interception by picking off a pass from Tennessee Titans' quarterback Marcus Mariota in a 26–23 overtime loss on September 30. He recorded his second interception of the season off of quarterback Jared Goff during the 30–23 win over the Los Angeles Rams.

On September 26, 2019, late in a game against the Green Bay Packers, Maddox collided helmets with teammate Andrew Sendejo on an attempted tackle of Jamaal Williams and had to be carted off the field on a stretcher. The Eagles announced that Maddox had movement in all of his extremities, but was taken to a local hospital overnight as a precaution and for further evaluation; he returned with the team the next day.

In the 2020 season, during the Eagles' Week 3 game against the Cincinnati Bengals, Maddox suffered an injury which ultimately forced him to miss the next three games before being re-activated on Week 7. On December 18, 2020, Maddox was placed on season-ending injured reserve after suffering a knee injury in a Week 14 win over the New Orleans Saints. He finished the season with 40 tackles and three pass deflections, playing in 10 games with eight starts.

Starting the last season of his rookie contract in 2021, Maddox led the Eagles in tackles (9) during their 32–6 win over the Atlanta Falcons. On October 24 against the Las Vegas Raiders, Maddox recorded his third career interception during the 33–22 loss. On November 20, 2021, Maddox signed a three-year, $22.5 million contract extension with the Eagles. He was placed on the COVID list on January 3, 2022. Maddox was activated one week later on January 10, missing just one game in which the Eagles did not use their starters.

Maddox returned as a starter in 2022 as the team's primary nickelback. He was placed on injured reserve on November 14, 2022, with a hamstring injury. He was activated on December 10. On December 26, it was announced that Maddox had suffered a 'significant' toe injury and would miss the remainder of the regular season. Maddox reached Super Bowl LVII where the Eagles lost 38–35 to the Kansas City Chiefs; he recorded seven tackles in the game.

On September 20, 2023, Maddox was placed on injured reserve after suffering a pec injury in Week 2. He was activated on December 30.

On March 7, 2024, Maddox was released by the Eagles. He re-signed with the team on April 4. Maddox won his first Super Bowl when the Eagles defeated the Kansas City Chiefs 40–22 in Super Bowl LIX. Maddox had one pass defended in the game, forcing a turnover on downs.

=== Detroit Lions ===
On March 21, 2025, Maddox signed a one-year contract with his hometown team, the Detroit Lions.

On April 6, 2026, Maddox signed another one-year contract with the Lions. In the team's Week 2 matchup against the Buffalo Bills, Maddox suffered a foot injury that required season-ending surgery.

== NFL career statistics ==
Legend
Won the Super Bowl

Season		Games		Tackles					Interceptions					Fumbles			
Year	Team	GP	GS	COMB	SOLO	AST	TFL	SACK	PD	INT	YDS	LNG	TD	FF	FR	YDS	TD
2018	PHI	13	9	35	28	7	1	0.5	4	2	23	23	0	1	0	0	0
2019	PHI	12	6	76	47	38	9	1.0	10	0	8	0	0	1	0	0	0
2020	PHI	10	8	40	36	4	1	0.0	3	0	0	0	0	0	0	0	0
2021	PHI	16	5	73	53	20	5	0.5	9	1	-1	-1	0	2	0	0	0
2022	PHI	9	8	43	28	15	3	1.0	3	1	2	2	0	3	1	10	0
2023	PHI	4	2	12	8	4	1	0.0	2	0	0	0	0	1	0	0	0
2024	PHI	17	3	20	9	11	0	0.0	5	0	0	0	0	0	0	0	0
2025	DET	14	3	32	23	9	1	0.0	4	1	0	0	0	1	0	0	0
2026	DET	2	2	10	5	5	0	0.0	2	0	0	0	0	0	0	0	0
Career		97	46	312	228	84	14	3.0	42	5	32	23	0	9	1	10	0
