= 2016 Atlanta Falcons season =

NFL team season

- Owner: Arthur Blank
- General manager: Thomas Dimitroff
- Head coach: Dan Quinn
- Offensive coordinator: Kyle Shanahan
- Defensive coordinator: Richard Smith
- Home stadium: Georgia Dome

Results
- Record: 11–5
- Division place: 1st NFC South
- Playoffs: Won Divisional Playoffs (vs. Seahawks) 36–20; Won NFC Championship (vs. Packers) 44–21; Lost Super Bowl LI (vs. Patriots) 28–34 (OT)
- All-Pros: 4: QB Matt Ryan (1st team); WR Julio Jones (1st team); OLB Vic Beasley (1st team); C Alex Mack (2nd team)
- Pro Bowlers: 6: Selected but did not participate due to participation in Super Bowl LI: QB Matt Ryan; RB Devonta Freeman; WR Julio Jones; C Alex Mack; OLB Vic Beasley; K Matt Bryant

Uniform
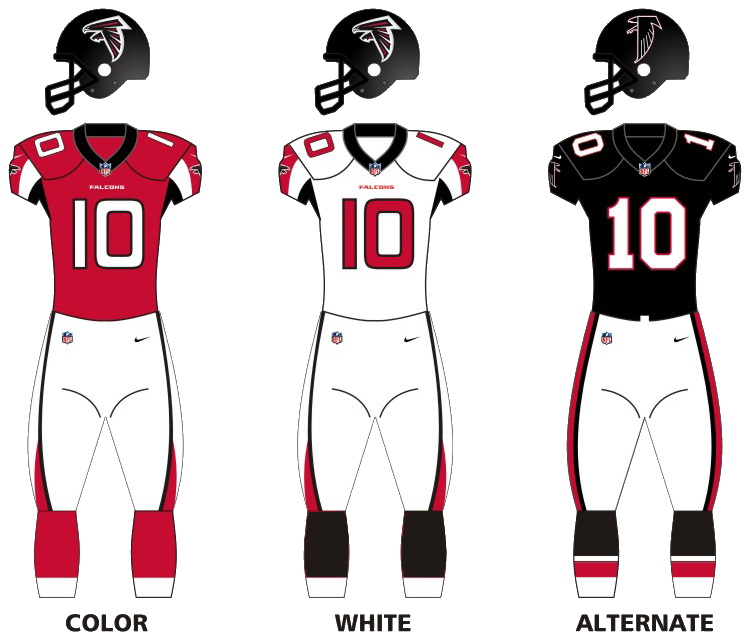

The 2016 season was the Atlanta Falcons' 51st in the National Football League (NFL) and their second under head coach Dan Quinn. It also marked the team's 25th and final season playing their home games at the Georgia Dome, ahead of their move to the new Mercedes-Benz Stadium in 2017. The Falcons won the NFC South for the first time since 2012 and improved on their 8–8 record from 2015, going 11–5 and earning the second seed in the NFC playoffs. Quarterback Matt Ryan was named the 2016 AP NFL Most Valuable Player (MVP). The Falcons scored 540 points, the most in the NFL for 2016 and 8th all-time. The team scored fewer than 23 points only once all season: a 24–15 road loss to the Eagles in the Week 10.

The Falcons defeated the Seattle Seahawks 36–20 in the Divisional Round to advance to the NFC Championship Game for the first time since 2012. In the NFC Championship game, they defeated the Green Bay Packers, 44–21, to advance to their second Super Bowl appearance in franchise history; they had competed in Super Bowl XXXIII 18 years earlier. In Super Bowl LI, the Falcons faced the New England Patriots, and built up a 28–3 lead midway through the third quarter. However, the Patriots subsequently scored 25 unanswered points, forcing overtime for the first time in Super Bowl history. There, the Falcons failed to slow the Patriots down, and were defeated by a score of 34–28.

As of 2026, this season remains the last time the Falcons have won the NFC South.

== Free agents ==
| Position | Player | Tag | 2016 Team | Notes |
|---|---|---|---|---|
| S | Ricardo Allen | | Atlanta Falcons | |
| DE | Kroy Biermann | UFA | Buffalo Bills | |
| G | Chris Chester | UFA | Atlanta Falcons | |
| DE | Adrian Clayborn | | Atlanta Falcons | |
| S | Charles Godfrey | | Atlanta Falcons | |
| K | Shayne Graham | UFA | None | Retired |
| C | Gino Gradkowski | | Carolina Panthers | |
| OT | Bryce Harris | UFA | Atlanta Falcons | |
| OT | Jake Long | | Minnesota Vikings | |
| TE | Tony Moeaki | UFA | Chicago Bears | |
| OT | Ryan Schraeder | | Atlanta Falcons | |
| MLB | Nathan Stupar | | New Orleans Saints | |
| TE | D.J. Tialavea | | Atlanta Falcons | |
| OLB | Philip Wheeler | UFA | Atlanta Falcons | |
| OLB | Paul Worrilow | | Atlanta Falcons | |

=== Draft ===
2016 Atlanta Falcons draft
| Round | Pick | Player | Position | College | Notes |
| 1 | 17 | Keanu Neal * | SS | Florida | |
| 2 | 50 | Deion Jones * | OLB | LSU | |
| 3 | 81 | Austin Hooper * | TE | Stanford | |
| 4 | 115 | De'Vondre Campbell | OLB | Minnesota | |
| 6 | 195 | Wes Schweitzer | G | San Jose State | |
| 7 | 238 | Devin Fuller | WR | UCLA | |
Made roster † Pro Football Hall of Fame * Made at least one Pro Bowl during career

Notes

- The Falcons did not select a player in the fifth round:
  - The team forfeited their fifth-round selection as the punishment for piping artificial crowd noise into the Georgia Dome during the 2013 and 2014 seasons. If the Falcons receive multiple fifth-round selections, the team will forfeit its first fifth-round selection;
  - The Falcons traded their sixth-round selection (No. 193) to the Tennessee Titans in exchange for guard Andy Levitre and a future undisclosed selection. They subsequently acquired Pick No. 195 from the New York Jets.

== Staff ==
2016 Atlanta Falcons staff
| Front office: Owner/Chairman – Arthur M. Blank; President/CEO – Rich McKay; general manager – Thomas Dimitroff; Assistant general manager – Scott Pioli; Director of pro personnel – Joel Collier; Director, Football Operations – Nick Polk; Director of college scouting – Steve Sabo; National Scout – Ruston Webster; National Scout – Phil Emery; Head coaches: Head coach – Dan Quinn; Assistant head coach/wide receivers – Raheem Morris; Assistant to the head coach – Steve Scarnecchia; Offensive coaches: Offensive coordinator – Kyle Shanahan; Quarterbacks – Matt LaFleur; Running backs – Bobby Turner; Tight ends – Wade Harman; Offensive line – Chris Morgan; Assistant offensive line – Keith Carter; Offensive assistant – Mike LaFleur; Offensive assistant – Mike McDaniel | Defensive coaches: Defensive coordinator – Richard Smith; Defensive line – Bryan Cox; Linebackers – Jeff Ulbrich; Passing game coordinator – Jerome Henderson; Senior defensive assistant/secondary – Marquand Manuel; Defensive assistant/linebackers – Doug Mallory; Defensive assistant/defensive backs – Chad Walker; Special teams coaches: Special teams coordinator – Keith Armstrong; Assistant special teams – Eric Sutulovich; Strength and conditioning: Athletic performance manager – A.J. Neibel; Head strength and conditioning – Jesse Ackerman; Assistant strength and conditioning – Jonas Beauchemin |

== Final roster ==
2016 Atlanta Falcons roster
| Quarterbacks (QB): 2 Matt Ryan; 8 Matt Schaub; Running backs (RB): 26 Tevin Coleman; 42 Patrick DiMarco; 24 Devonta Freeman; 28 Terron Ward; Wide receivers (WR): 18 Taylor Gabriel; 16 Justin Hardy; 11 Julio Jones; 19 Aldrick Robinson; 12 Mohamed Sanu; 14 Eric Weems; 15 Nick Williams; Tight ends (TE): 81 Austin Hooper; 82 Joshua Perkins; 86 D. J. Tialavea; 80 Levine Toilolo | Offensive linemen (OL): 65 Chris Chester G; 76 Tom Compton T; 63 Ben Garland C; 67 Andy Levitre G; 51 Alex Mack C; 70 Jake Matthews T; 73 Ryan Schraeder T; 71 Wes Schweitzer G; Defensive linemen (DL): 95 Jonathan Babineaux DT; 99 Adrian Clayborn DE; 93 Dwight Freeney DE; 77 Ra'Shede Hageman DT; 94 Tyson Jackson DE; 97 Grady Jarrett DT; 50 Brooks Reed DE; 91 Courtney Upshaw DE | Linebackers (LB): 44 Vic Beasley OLB; 59 De'Vondre Campbell OLB; 45 Deion Jones MLB; 52 Josh Keyes OLB; 53 LaRoy Reynolds MLB; 41 Philip Wheeler OLB; 55 Paul Worrilow OLB; Defensive backs (DB): 23 Robert Alford CB; 37 Ricardo Allen FS; 32 Jalen Collins CB; 38 Dashon Goldson SS; 29 C. J. Goodwin CB; 22 Keanu Neal SS; 20 Sharrod Neasman FS; 30 Deji Olatoye CB; 34 Brian Poole CB; 33 Blidi Wreh-Wilson CB; Special teams (ST): 5 Matt Bosher P; 3 Matt Bryant K; 47 Josh Harris LS | Practice squad: 61 Carter Bykowski T; 13 B. J. Daniels WR; 66 Kevin Graf T; 49 Darion Griswold TE; 98 Martin Ifedi DE; 64 Blake Muir G; 35 Jhurell Pressley RB; 4 Matt Simms QB; 92 Joe Vellano DT; 38 Ryan White CB; Reserve: 87 Devin Fuller WR (IR); 36 Kemal Ishmael SS (IR); 25 Akeem King CB (IR); 74 Chris Mayes DT (IR); 90 Derrick Shelby DE (IR); -- Tyler Starr OLB (IR); 83 Jacob Tamme TE (IR); 21 Desmond Trufant CB (IR); 56 Sean Weatherspoon OLB (IR); Rookies in italics 53 active, 9 reserve, 10 practice squad |

== Preseason ==
=== Schedule ===
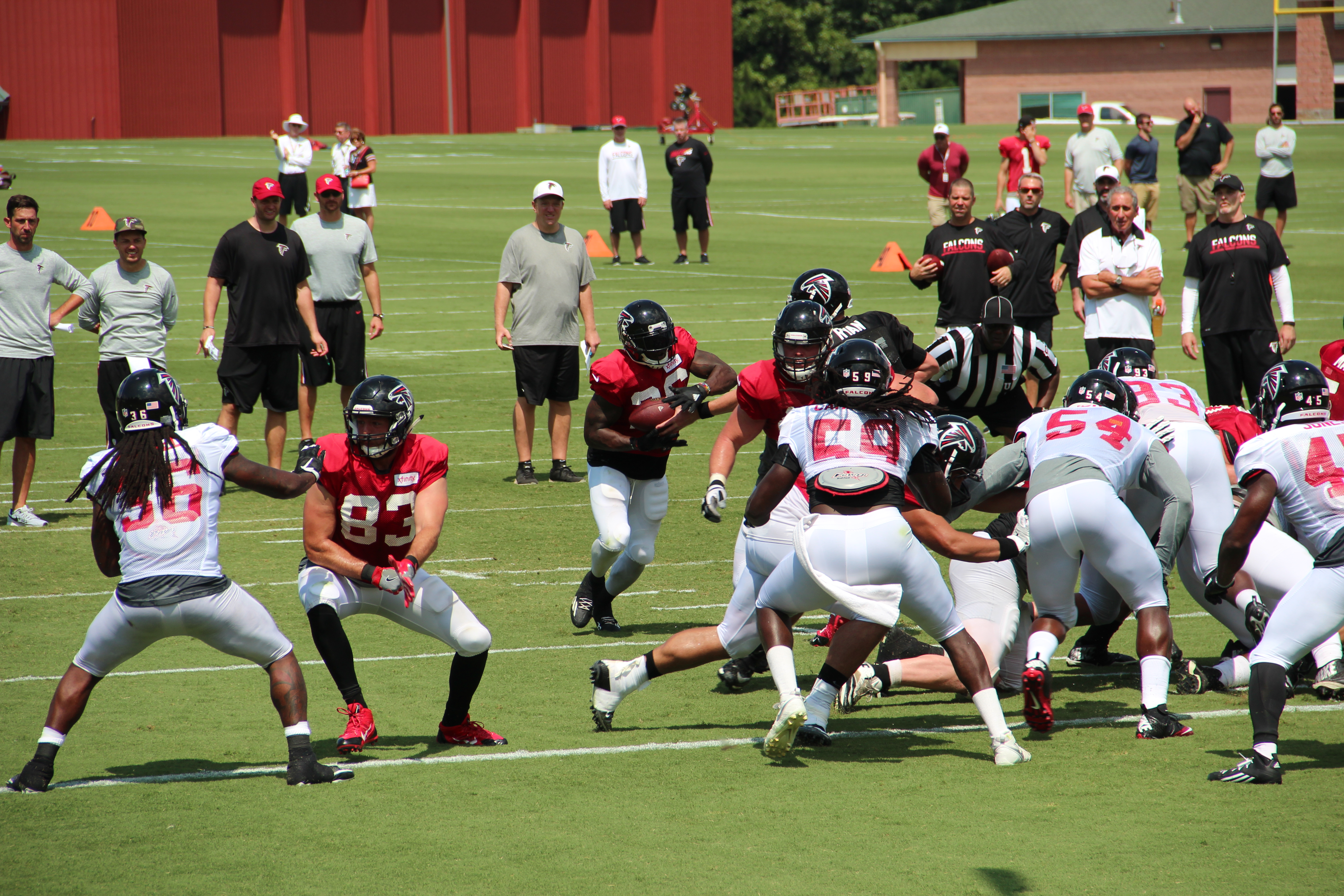
Falcons players at training camp, July 2016.

The Falcons preseason opponents and schedule were announced on April 7, 2016.

| Week | Date | Opponent | Result | Record | Venue | Recap |
|---|---|---|---|---|---|---|
| 1 | August 11 | Washington Redskins | W 23–17 | 1–0 | Georgia Dome | Recap |
| 2 | August 18 | at Cleveland Browns | W 24–13 | 2–0 | FirstEnergy Stadium | Recap |
| 3 | August 25 | at Miami Dolphins | L 6–17 | 2–1 | Camping World Stadium (Orlando) | Recap |
| 4 | September 1 | Jacksonville Jaguars | W 17–15 | 3–1 | Georgia Dome | Recap |

== Regular season ==
=== Schedule ===
| Week | Date | Opponent | Result | Record | Venue | Recap |
|---|---|---|---|---|---|---|
| 1 | September 11 | **Tampa Bay Buccaneers** | **L** 24–31 | 0–1 | Georgia Dome | Recap |
| 2 | September 18 | at Oakland Raiders | **W** 35–28 | 1–1 | Oakland Alameda Coliseum | Recap |
| 3 | September 26 | at **New Orleans Saints** | **W** 45–32 | 2–1 | Mercedes-Benz Superdome | Recap |
| 4 | October 2 | **Carolina Panthers** | **W** 48–33 | 3–1 | Georgia Dome | Recap |
| 5 | October 9 | at Denver Broncos | **W** 23–16 | 4–1 | Sports Authority Field at Mile High | Recap |
| 6 | October 16 | at Seattle Seahawks | **L** 24–26 | 4–2 | CenturyLink Field | Recap |
| 7 | October 23 | San Diego Chargers | **L** 30–33 (OT) | 4–3 | Georgia Dome | Recap |
| 8 | October 30 | Green Bay Packers | **W** 33–32 | 5–3 | Georgia Dome | Recap |
| 9 | November 3 | at **Tampa Bay Buccaneers** | **W** 43–28 | 6–3 | Raymond James Stadium | Recap |
| 10 | November 13 | at Philadelphia Eagles | **L** 15–24 | 6–4 | Lincoln Financial Field | Recap |
| 11 | Bye | | | | | |
| 12 | November 27 | Arizona Cardinals | **W** 38–19 | 7–4 | Georgia Dome | Recap |
| 13 | December 4 | Kansas City Chiefs | **L** 28–29 | 7–5 | Georgia Dome | Recap |
| 14 | December 11 | at Los Angeles Rams | **W** 42–14 | 8–5 | Los Angeles Memorial Coliseum | Recap |
| 15 | December 18 | San Francisco 49ers | **W** 41–13 | 9–5 | Georgia Dome | Recap |
| 16 | December 24 | at **Carolina Panthers** | **W** 33–16 | 10–5 | Bank of America Stadium | Recap |
| 17 | January 1 | **New Orleans Saints** | **W** 38–32 | 11–5 | Georgia Dome | Recap |

Note: Intra-division opponents are in bold text.

=== Game summaries ===
==== Week 1: vs. Tampa Bay Buccaneers ====
Week One: Tampa Bay Buccaneers at Atlanta Falcons – Game summary

| Quarter | 1 | 2 | 3 | 4 | Total |
|---|---|---|---|---|---|
| **Buccaneers** | 3 | 14 | 14 | 0 | **31** |
| Falcons | 10 | 3 | 8 | 3 | **24** |

at Georgia Dome, Atlanta, Georgia

- Date: September 11
- Game time: 1:00 p.m. EDT
- Game weather: Played indoors (dome stadium)
- Game attendance: 69,382
- Referee: Jeff Triplette
- TV announcers (Fox): Sam Rosen, David Diehl and Holly Sonders
- Recap, Gamebook

Game information

**First quarter**

- TB – Roberto Aguayo 43-yard field goal, 9:57. Buccaneers 3–0. **Drive: 7 plays, 37 yards, 3:02.**
- ATL – Matt Bryant 34-yard field goal, 7:13. Tied 3–3. **Drive: 5 plays, 59 yards, 2:44.**
- ATL – Mohamed Sanu 5-yard pass from Matt Ryan (Matt Bryant kick), 0:16. Falcons 10–3. **Drive: 4 plays, 18 yards, 2:20.**

**Second quarter**

- TB – Brandon Myers 4-yard pass from Jameis Winston (Roberto Aguayo kick), 10:31. Tied 10–10. **Drive: 9 plays, 75 yards, 4:46.**
- ATL – Matt Bryant 34-yard field goal, 1:50. Falcons 13–10. **Drive: 7 plays, 45 yards, 3:14.**
- TB – Charles Sims 23-yard pass from Jameis Winston (Roberto Aguayo kick), 0:24. Buccaneers 17–13. **Drive: 10 plays, 75 yards, 1:31.**

**Third quarter**

- TB – Austin Seferian-Jenkins 30-yard pass from Jameis Winston (Roberto Aguayo kick), 13:02. Buccaneers 24–13. **Drive: 4 plays, 75 yards, 2:06.**
- TB – Mike Evans 45-yard pass from Jameis Winston (Robert Aguayo kick), 5:21. Buccaneers 31–13. **Drive: 7 plays, 92 yards, 3:16.**
- ATL – Julio Jones 25-yard pass from Matt Ryan (Matt Ryan–Mohamed Sanu pass), 1:42. Buccaneers 31–21. **Drive: 9 plays, 71 yards, 3:37.**

**Fourth quarter**

- ATL – Matt Bryant 29-yard field goal, 4:59. Buccaneers 31–24. **Drive: 11 plays, 49 yards, 4:54.**

**Top passers**

- TB – Jameis Winston – 23/32, 281 yards, 4 TD, INT
- ATL – Matt Ryan – 27/39, 334 yards, 2 TD

**Top rushers**

- TB – Doug Martin – 18 rushes, 62 yards
- ATL – Tevin Coleman – 8 rushes, 22 yards

**Top receivers**

- TB – Mike Evans – 5 receptions, 99 yards, TD
- ATL – Tevin Coleman – 5 receptions, 95 yards

With the loss, the Falcons started their season 0–1 for the first time since 2013.

==== Week 2: at Oakland Raiders ====
Week Two: Atlanta Falcons at Oakland Raiders – Game summary

| Quarter | 1 | 2 | 3 | 4 | Total |
|---|---|---|---|---|---|
| **Falcons** | 0 | 13 | 8 | 14 | **35** |
| Raiders | 0 | 7 | 7 | 14 | **28** |

at Oakland Alameda Coliseum, Oakland, California

- Date: September 18
- Game time: 4:25 pm. EDT/1:25 p.m. PDT
- Game weather: 79 °F (26 °C), sunny
- Game attendance: 54,081
- Referee: Clete Blakeman
- TV announcers (CBS): Kevin Harlan and Rich Gannon
- Recap, Gamebook

Game information

**First quarter**

- No scoring plays

**Second quarter**

- ATL – Matt Bryant 21-yard field goal, 11:58. Falcons 3–0. **Drive: 11 plays, 88 yards, 4:55.**
- OAK – Latavius Murray 1-yard run (Sebastian Janikowski kick), 7:51. Raiders 7–3. **Drive: 7 plays, 91 yards, 4:07.**
- ATL – Julio Jones 21-yard pass from Matt Ryan (Matt Bryant kick), 4:46. Falcons 10–7. **Drive: 10 plays, 75 yards, 3:05.**
- ATL – Matt Bryant 20-yard field goal, 0:38. Falcons 13–7. **Drive: 4 plays, 7 yards, 0:55.**

**Third quarter**

- OAK – Clive Walford 31-yard pass from Derek Carr (Sebastian Janikowski kick), 11:17. Raiders 14–13. **Drive: 8 plays, 81 yards, 3:43.**
- ATL – Jacob Tamme 14-yard pass from Matt Ryan (Matt Ryan run), 3:42. Falcons 21–14. **Drive: 5 plays, 85 yards, 1:54.**

**Fourth quarter**

- OAK – Michael Crabtree 2-yard pass from Derek Carr (Sebastian Janikowski kick), 12:00. Tied 21–21. **Drive: 13 plays, 75 yards, 6:42.**
- ATL – Justin Hardy 13-yard run (Matt Bryant kick), 9:29. Falcons 28–21. **Drive: 6 plays, 75 yards, 2:31.**
- ATL – Tevin Coleman 13-yard run (Matt Bryant kick), 4:35. Falcons 35–21. **Drive: 5 plays, 50 yards, 2:37.**
- OAK – Andre Holmes 6-yard pass from Derek Carr (Sebastian Janikowski kick), 2:12. Falcons 35–28. **Drive: 8 plays, 75 yards, 2:23.**

**Top passers**

- ATL – Matt Ryan – 26/34, 396 yards, 3 TD, INT
- OAK – Derek Carr – 34/45, 299 yards, 3 TD

**Top rushers**

- ATL – Devonta Freeman – 17 rushes, 93 yards
- OAK – Latavius Murray – 8 rushes, 57 yards, TD

**Top receivers**

- ATL – Julio Jones – 5 receptions, 106 yards, TD
- OAK – Amari Cooper – 5 receptions, 71 yards

With the win, the Falcons improved to 1–1.

==== Week 3: at New Orleans Saints ====
Week Three: Atlanta Falcons at New Orleans Saints – Game summary

| Quarter | 1 | 2 | 3 | 4 | Total |
|---|---|---|---|---|---|
| **Falcons** | 7 | 21 | 10 | 7 | **45** |
| Saints | 7 | 10 | 8 | 7 | **32** |

at Mercedes-Benz Superdome, New Orleans, Louisiana

- Date: September 26
- Game time: 8:30 pm. EDT/7:30 p.m. CDT
- Game weather: Played indoors (dome stadium)
- Game attendance: 73,003
- Referee: Pete Morelli
- TV announcers (ESPN): Sean McDonough, Jon Gruden and Lisa Salters
- Recap, Gamebook

Game information

**First quarter**

- NO – Coby Fleener 2-yard pass from Drew Brees (Wil Lutz kick), 8:25. Saints 7–0. **Drive: 11 plays, 75, yards, 6:35.**
- ATL – Tevin Coleman 2-yard run (Matt Bryant kick), 5:21. Tied 7–7. **Drive: 3 plays, 11 yards, 0:52.**

**Second quarter**

- ATL – Devonta Freeman 13-yard pass from Matt Ryan (Matt Bryant kick), 14:53. Falcons 14–7. **Drive: 11 plays, 74, yards, 5:08.**
- NO – Michael Thomas 3-yard pass from Drew Brees (Wil Lutz kick), 9:55. Tied 14–14. **Drive: 12 plays, 75, yards, 4:58.**
- ATL – Tevin Coleman 2-yard run (Matt Bryant kick), 5:31. Falcons 21–14. **Drive: 11 plays, 75 yards, 4:24.**
- ATL – Justin Hardy 4-yard pass from Matt Ryan (Matt Bryant kick), 0:28. Falcons 28–14. **Drive: 8 plays, 94, yards, 1:23.**
- NO – Wil Lutz 57-yard field goal, 0:00. Falcons 28–17. **Drive: 7 plays, 36 yards, 0:28.**

**Third quarter**

- ATL – Tevin Coleman 6-yard run (Matt Bryant kick), 12:03. Falcons 35–17. **Drive: 6 plays, 75 yards, 2:57.**
- NO – John Kuhn 3-yard run (Mark Ingram II run), 7:38. Falcons 35–25. **Drive: 9 plays, 75 yards, 4:25.**
- ATL – Matt Bryant 21-yard field goal, 2:58. Falcons 38–25. **Drive: 11 plays, 76 yards, 4:40.**

**Fourth quarter**

- ATL – Deion Jones 90-yard interception return (Matt Bryant kick), 13:37. Falcons 45–25. **Drive: 9 plays, 64 yards, 4:21.**
- NO – Mark Ingram II 5-yard pass from Drew Brees (Wil Lutz kick), 10:00. Falcons 45–32. **Drive: 7 plays, 75, yards, 3:37.**

**Top passers**

- ATL – Matt Ryan – 20/30, 240 yards, 2 TD
- NO – Drew Brees – 36/54, 376 yards, 3 TD, INT

**Top rushers**

- ATL – Devonta Freeman – 14 rushes, 152 yards
- NO – Mark Ingram II – 15 rushes, 77 yards

**Top receivers**

- ATL – Devonta Freeman – 5 receptions, 55 yards, TD
- NO – Coby Fleener – 7 receptions, 109 yards, TD

With the win, the Falcons improved to 2–1.

==== Week 4: vs. Carolina Panthers ====
Week Four: Carolina Panthers at Atlanta Falcons – Game summary

| Quarter | 1 | 2 | 3 | 4 | Total |
|---|---|---|---|---|---|
| Panthers | 0 | 10 | 0 | 23 | **33** |
| **Falcons** | 14 | 3 | 14 | 17 | **48** |

at Georgia Dome, Atlanta, Georgia

- Date: October 2
- Game time: 1:00 pm. EDT
- Game weather: Played indoors (dome stadium)
- Game attendance: 70,508
- Referee: John Hussey
- TV announcers (Fox): Dick Stockton, Chris Spielman and Kristina Pink
- Recap, Gamebook

Game information

**First quarter**

- ATL – Jacob Tamme 4-yard pass from Matt Ryan (Matt Bryant kick), 7:14. Falcons 7–0. **Drive: 8 plays, 71 yards, 4:19.**
- ATL – Devonta Freeman 13-yard run (Matt Bryant kick), 0:17. Falcons 14–0. **Drive: 6 plays, 98 yards, 3:33.**

**Second quarter**

- CAR – Kurt Coleman 8-yard interception return (Graham Gano kick), 11:31. Falcons 14–7.
- ATL – Matt Bryant 28-yard field goal, 5:56. Falcons 17–7. **Drive: 10 plays, 65 yards, 5:35.**
- CAR – Graham Gano 54-yard field goal, 3:07. Falcons 17–10. **Drive: 6 plays, 39 yards, 2:49.**

**Third quarter**

- ATL – Austin Hooper 42-yard pass from Matt Ryan (Matt Bryant kick), 9:13. Falcons 24–10. **Drive: 10 plays, 99 yards, 5:47.**
- ATL – Aldrick Robinson 35-yard pass from Matt Ryan (Matt Bryant kick), 4:57. Falcons 31–10. **Drive: 9 plays, 92 yards, 3:19.**

**Fourth quarter**

- ATL – Matt Bryant 53-yard field goal, 13:19. Falcons 34–10. **Drive: 10 plays, 36 yards, 5:17.**
- CAR – Kelvin Benjamin 6-yard pass from Cam Newton (Cam Newton run), 11:42. Falcons 34–18. **Drive: 5 plays, 63 yards, 1:37.**
- CAR – Greg Olsen 14-yard pass from Derek Anderson (Derek Anderson–Greg Olsen pass), 3:58. Falcons 34–26. **Drive: 9 plays, 94 yards, 5:23.**
- ATL – Julio Jones 75-yard pass from Matt Ryan (Matt Bryant kick), 3:45. Falcons 41–26. **Drive: 1 play, 75 yards, 0:13.**
- CAR – Corey Brown 16-yard pass from Derek Anderson (Graham Gano kick), 1:53. Falcons 41–33. **Drive: 11 plays, 75 yards, 1:52.**
- ATL – Robert Alford 30-yard interception return (Matt Bryant kick), 1:14. Falcons 48–33.

**Top passers**

- CAR – Derek Anderson – 17/23, 172 yards, 2 TD, 2 INT
- ATL – Matt Ryan – 28/37, 503 yards, 4 TD, INT

**Top rushers**

- CAR – Cam Newton – 5 rushes, 30 yards
- ATL – Devonta Freeman – 13 rushes, 57 yards, TD

**Top receivers**

- CAR – Fozzy Whittaker – 9 receptions, 86 yards
- ATL – Julio Jones – 12 receptions, 300 yards, TD

Matt Ryan and Julio Jones made Falcons team history as Ryan exploded to 503 passing yards and Jones caught twelve passes for 300 yards and a touchdown, becoming the first quarterback-receiver duo to break 500 passing yards and 300 receiving yards in club history and the first such tandem in the NFL's Super Bowl era. Cam Newton was knocked out of the game with a concussion incurred on a two-point conversion run. With the win, the Falcons improved to 3–1.

==== Week 5: at Denver Broncos ====
Week Five: Atlanta Falcons at Denver Broncos – Game summary

| Quarter | 1 | 2 | 3 | 4 | Total |
|---|---|---|---|---|---|
| **Falcons** | 10 | 3 | 7 | 3 | **23** |
| Broncos | 0 | 3 | 0 | 13 | **16** |

at Sports Authority Field at Mile High, Denver, Colorado

- Date: October 9
- Game time: 4:05 pm. EDT/2:05 p.m. MDT
- Game weather: 72 °F (22 °C), mostly cloudy
- Game attendance: 76,802
- Referee: Terry McAulay
- TV announcers (Fox): Chris Myers, John Lynch and Pam Oliver
- Recap, Gamebook

Game information

**First quarter**

- ATL – Devonta Freeman 1-yard run (Matt Bryant kick), 11:18. Falcons 7–0. **Drive: 9 plays, 75 yards, 3:42.**
- ATL – Matt Bryant 46-yard field goal, 4:23. Falcons 10–0. **Drive: 8 plays, 44 yards, 4:23.**

**Second quarter**

- DEN – Brandon McManus 35-yard field goal, 11:39. Falcons 10–3. **Drive: 10 plays, 40 yards, 3:54.**
- ATL – Matt Bryant 33-yard field goal, 1:48. Falcons 13–3. **Drive: 17 plays, 77 yards, 7:00.**

**Third quarter**

- ATL – Tevin Coleman 31-yard pass from Matt Ryan (Matt Bryant kick), 7:53. Falcons 20–3. **Drive: 3 plays, 42 yards, 2:01.**

**Fourth quarter**

- DEN – Brandon McManus 46-yard field goal, 11:01. Falcons 20–6. **Drive: 8 plays, 22 yards, 3:59.**
- ATL – Matt Bryant 25-yard field goal, 8:20. Falcons 23–6. **Drive: 6 plays, 68 yards, 2:41.**
- DEN – Demaryius Thomas 3-yard pass from Paxton Lynch (Brandon McManus kick), 2:38. Falcons 23–13. **Drive: 16 plays, 78 yards, 5:42.**
- DEN – Brandon McManus 45-yard field goal, 0:14. Falcons 23–16. **Drive: 7 plays, 44 yards, 1:42.**

**Top passers**

- ATL – Matt Ryan – 15/28, 267 yards, TD
- DEN – Paxton Lynch – 23/35, 223 yards, TD, INT

**Top rushers**

- ATL – Devonta Freeman – 23 rushes, 88 yards, TD
- DEN – C. J. Anderson – 11 rushes, 41 yards

**Top receivers**

- ATL – Tevin Coleman – 4 receptions, 132 yards, TD
- DEN – Emmanuel Sanders – 7 receptions, 80 yards

With the win, the Falcons improved to 4–1 for the first time since 2010.

==== Week 6: at Seattle Seahawks ====
Week Six: Atlanta Falcons at Seattle Seahawks – Game summary

| Quarter | 1 | 2 | 3 | 4 | Total |
|---|---|---|---|---|---|
| Falcons | 0 | 3 | 21 | 0 | **24** |
| **Seahawks** | 7 | 10 | 0 | 9 | **26** |

at CenturyLink Field, Seattle, Washington

- Date: October 16
- Game time: 4:25 pm. EDT/1:25 pm. PDT
- Game weather: 54 °F (12 °C), rain
- Game attendance: 69,071
- Referee: Tony Corrente
- TV announcers (Fox): Chris Myers, Ronde Barber and Jennifer Hale
- Recap, Gamebook

Game information

**First quarter**

- SEA – Christine Michael 9-yard run (Steven Hauschka kick), 2:02. Seahawks 7–0. **Drive: 1 play, 9 yards, 0:05.**

**Second quarter**

- ATL – Matt Bryant 33-yard field goal, 8:38. Seahawks 7–3. **Drive: 12 plays, 52 yards, 4:37.**
- SEA – Alex Collins 2-yard run (Steven Hauschka kick), 4:32. Seahawks 14–3. **Drive: 8 plays, 75 yards, 4:06.**
- SEA – Steven Hauschka 42-yard field goal, 0:42. Seahawks 17–3. **Drive: 5 plays, 22 yards, 1:16.**

**Third quarter**

- ATL – Julio Jones 36-yard pass from Matt Ryan (Matt Bryant kick), 11:01. Seahawks 17–10. **Drive: 9 plays, 75 yards, 3:59.**
- ATL – Mohamed Sanu 10-yard pass from Matt Ryan (Matt Bryant kick), 6:11. Tied 17–17. **Drive: 8 plays, 79 yards, 3:23.**
- ATL – Levine Toilolo 46-yard pass from Matt Ryan (Matt Bryant kick), 0:17. Falcons 24–17. **Drive: 6 plays, 97 yards, 3:27.**

**Fourth quarter**

- SEA – Christine Michael 1-yard run (kick blocked), 4:43. Falcons 24–23. **Drive: 9 plays, 70 yards, 3:51.**
- SEA – Steven Hauschka 44-yard field goal, 1:57. Seahawks 26–24. **Drive: 7 plays, 24 yards, 1:51.**

**Top passers**

- ATL – Matt Ryan – 27/42, 335 yards, 3 TD, INT
- SEA – Russell Wilson – 25/37, 270 yards

**Top rushers**

- ATL – Devonta Freeman – 12 rushes, 40 yards
- SEA – Christine Michael – 18 rushes, 64 yards, 2 TD

**Top receivers**

- ATL – Julio Jones – 7 receptions, 139 yards, TD
- SEA – Jimmy Graham – 6 receptions, 89 yards

With the loss, the Falcons dropped to 4–2.

==== Week 7: vs. San Diego Chargers ====
Week Seven: San Diego Chargers at Atlanta Falcons – Game summary

| Quarter | 1 | 2 | 3 | 4 | OT | Total |
|---|---|---|---|---|---|---|
| **Chargers** | 7 | 10 | 3 | 10 | 3 | **33** |
| Falcons | 6 | 21 | 0 | 3 | 0 | **30** |

at Georgia Dome, Atlanta, Georgia

- Date: October 23
- Game time: 4:05 pm. EDT
- Game weather: Played indoors (dome stadium)
- Game attendance: 69,832
- Referee: Bill Vinovich
- TV announcers (Fox): Sam Rosen, Daryl Johnston and Laura Okmin
- Recap, Gamebook

Game information

**First quarter**

- SD – Melvin Gordon 2-yard run (Josh Lambo kick), 10:55. Chargers 7–0. **Drive: 7 plays, 75 yards, 4:05.**
- ATL – Matt Bryant 42-yard field goal, 6:26. Chargers 7–3. **Drive: 10 plays, 51 yards, 4:29.**
- ATL – Matt Bryant 27-yard field goal, 2:34. Chargers 7–6. **Drive: 4 plays, 1 yard, 0:56.**

**Second quarter**

- SD – Josh Lambo 40-yard field goal, 13:29. Chargers 10–6. **Drive: 10 plays, 61 yards, 4:05.**
- ATL – Jacob Tamme 17-yard pass from Matt Ryan (Matt Bryant kick), 9:06. Falcons 13–10. **Drive: 7 plays, 75 yards, 4:23.**
- ATL – Tevin Coleman 30-yard run (Matt Bryant kick), 6:07. Falcons 20–10. **Drive: 4 plays, 50 yards, 1:49.**
- ATL – Adrian Clayborn 5-yard fumble return (Matt Bryant kick), 4:31. Falcons 27–10.
- SD – Melvin Gordon 3-yard run (Josh Lambo kick), 1:02. Falcons 27–17. **Drive: 7 plays, 75 yards, 3:29.**

**Third quarter**

- SD – Josh Lambo 37-yard field goal, 4:50. Falcons 27–20. **Drive: 8 plays, 50 yards, 3:15.**

**Fourth quarter**

- ATL – Matt Bryant 31-yard field goal, 13:23. Falcons 30–20. **Drive: 13 plays, 62 yards, 6:27.**
- SD – Melvin Gordon 5-yard pass from Philip Rivers (Josh Lambo kick), 5:59. Falcons 30–27. **Drive: 15 plays, 75 yards, 7:24.**
- SD – Josh Lambo 33-yard field goal, 0:18. Tied 30–30. **Drive: 12 plays, 50 yards, 3:14.**

**Overtime**

- SD – Josh Lambo 42-yard field goal, 9:01. Chargers 33–30. **Drive: 6 plays, 19 yards, 3:11.**

**Top passers**

- SD – Philip Rivers – 27/44, 371 yards, TD, INT
- ATL – Matt Ryan – 22/34, 273 yards, TD, INT

**Top rushers**

- SD – Melvin Gordon – 22 rushes, 68 yards, 2 TD
- ATL – Tevin Coleman – 8 rushes, 64 yards, TD

**Top receivers**

- SD – Tyrell Williams – 7 receptions, 140 yards
- ATL – Julio Jones – 9 receptions, 174 yards

The Falcons blew a 17-point lead and lost to the Chargers, 33–30. They wore their black throwback uniforms for this game. With the game tied at 30–30, a missed 58-yarder by Matt Bryant forced the game into overtime. The Falcons received the ball first in overtime but turned the ball over on downs after failing to convert a fourth down. Josh Lambo kicked a 42-yard field goal in overtime to seal a 33–30 victory for the Chargers. With the brutal loss, the Falcons dropped to 4–3 for the first time since 2009. This is the final game the Falcons played against the San Diego-based Chargers. It also foreshadowed a more calamitous loss in which the Falcons blew a larger lead.

==== Week 8: vs. Green Bay Packers ====
Week Eight: Green Bay Packers at Atlanta Falcons – Game summary

| Quarter | 1 | 2 | 3 | 4 | Total |
|---|---|---|---|---|---|
| Packers | 7 | 17 | 0 | 8 | **32** |
| **Falcons** | 10 | 9 | 7 | 7 | **33** |

at Georgia Dome, Atlanta, Georgia

- Date: October 30
- Game time: 4:25 pm. EDT
- Game weather: Played indoors (dome stadium)
- Game attendance: 70,165
- Referee: Walt Anderson
- TV announcers (Fox): Thom Brennaman, Troy Aikman and Erin Andrews
- Recap, Gamebook

Game information

**First quarter**

- ATL – Matt Bryant 36-yard field goal, 9:46. Falcons 3–0. **Drive: 10 plays, 57 yards, 5:19.**
- GB – Jordy Nelson 5-yard pass from Aaron Rodgers (Mason Crosby kick), 6:14. Packers 7–3. **Drive: 6 plays, 75 yards, 3:33.**
- ATL – Taylor Gabriel 47-yard pass from Matt Ryan (Matt Bryant kick), 5:19. Falcons 10–7. **Drive: 3 plays, 71 yards, 1:40.**

**Second quarter**

- GB – Geronimo Allison 14-yard pass from Aaron Rodgers (Mason Crosby kick), 11:58. Packers 14–10. **Drive: 14 plays, 75 yards, 7:35.**
- ATL – Matt Bryant 40-yard field goal, 8:55. Packers 14–13. **Drive: 6 plays, 48 yards, 3:01.**
- GB – Trevor Davis 9-yard pass from Aaron Rodgers (Mason Crosby kick), 4:31. Packers 21–13. **Drive: 4 plays, 15 yards, 1:24.**
- ATL – Devonta Freeman 5-yard pass from Matt Ryan, 0:32. Packers 21–19. **Drive: 8 plays, 75 yards, 3:55.**
- GB – Mason Crosby 29-yard field goal, 0:04. Packers 24–19. **Drive: 4 plays, 64 yards, 0:27.**

**Third quarter**

- ATL – Devonta Freeman 1-yard run (Matt Bryant kick), 3:35. Falcons 26–24. **Drive: 14 plays, 80 yards, 7:31.**

**Fourth quarter**

- GB – Jeff Janis 7-yard pass from Aaron Rodgers (Aaron Rodgers run), 4:04. Packers 32–26. **Drive: 13 plays, 86 yards, 8:33.**
- ATL – Mohamed Sanu 11-yard pass from Matt Ryan (Matt Bryant kick), 0:36. Falcons 33–32. **Drive: 11 plays, 75 yards, 3:27.**

**Top passers**

- GB – Aaron Rodgers – 28/38, 246 yards, 4 TD
- ATL – Matt Ryan – 28/35, 288 yards, 3 TD

**Top rushers**

- GB – Aaron Rodgers – 6 rushes, 60 yards
- ATL – Terron Ward – 6 rushes, 46 yards

**Top receivers**

- GB – Jordy Nelson – 4 receptions, 94 yards, TD
- ATL – Mohamed Sanu – 9 receptions, 84 yards, TD

With the win, the Falcons improved to 5–3.

==== Week 9: at Tampa Bay Buccaneers ====
Week Nine: Atlanta Falcons at Tampa Bay Buccaneers – Game summary

| Quarter | 1 | 2 | 3 | 4 | Total |
|---|---|---|---|---|---|
| **Falcons** | 10 | 10 | 13 | 10 | **43** |
| Buccaneers | 7 | 7 | 0 | 14 | **28** |

at Raymond James Stadium, Tampa, Florida

- Date: November 3
- Game time: 8:25 pm. EDT
- Game weather: 76 °F (24 °C), clear
- Game attendance: 57,797
- Referee: Ronald Torbert
- TV announcers (NFLN): Al Michaels, Cris Collinsworth and Heather Cox
- Recap, Gamebook

Game information

**First quarter**

- TB – Mike Evans 3-yard pass from Jameis Winston (Roberto Aguayo kick), 9:37. Buccaneers 7–0. **Drive: 13 plays, 75 yards, 5:32.**
- ATL – Levine Toilolo 32-yard pass from Matt Ryan (Matt Bryant kick), 7:47. Tied 7–7. **Drive: 5 plays, 75 yards, 1:49.**
- ATL – Matt Bryant 29-yard field goal, 6:12. Falcons 10–7. **Drive: 4 plays, 3 yards, 0:56.**

**Second quarter**

- ATL – Matt Bryant 41-yard field goal, 13:42. Falcons 13–7. **Drive: 8 plays, 38 yards, 3:02.**
- TB – Mike Evans 24-yard pass from Jameis Winston (Roberto Aguayo kick), 8:43. Buccaneers 14–13. **Drive: 2 plays, 24 yards, 0:23.**
- ATL – Taylor Gabriel 9-yard run (Matt Bryant kick), 4:01. Falcons 20–14. **Drive: 9 plays, 74 yards, 4:39.**

**Third quarter**

- ATL – Patrick DiMarco 1-yard pass from Matt Ryan (pass failed), 8:59. Falcons 26–14. **Drive: 11 plays, 86 yards, 6:06.**
- ATL – Julio Jones 3-yard pass from Matt Ryan (Matt Bryant kick), 3:07. Falcons 33–14. **Drive: 10 plays, 82 yards, 4:52.**

**Fourth quarter**

- ATL – Austin Hooper 2-yard pass from Matt Ryan (Matt Bryant kick), 10:00. Falcons 40–14. **Drive: 9 plays, 57 yards, 4:43.**
- TB – Adam Humphries 7-yard pass from Jameis Winston (run failed), 6:53. Falcons 40–20. **Drive: 11 plays, 75 yards, 3:09.**
- ATL – Matt Bryant 50-yard field goal, 3:47. Falcons 43–20. **Drive: 6 plays, 12 yards, 3:05.**
- TB – Cameron Brate 2-yard pass from Mike Glennon (Mike Glennon–Brandon Myers pass), 1:01. Falcons 43–28. **Drive: 11 plays, 75 yards, 2:43.**

**Top passers**

- ATL – Matt Ryan – 25/34, 344 yards, 4 TD
- TB – Jameis Winston – 23/37, 261 yards, 3 TD

**Top rushers**

- ATL – Devonta Freeman – 17 rushes, 77 yards
- TB – Peyton Barber – 11 rushes, 31 yards

**Top receivers**

- ATL – Julio Jones – 8 receptions, 111 yards, TD
- TB – Mike Evans – 11 receptions, 150 yards, 2 TD

Despite Mike Evans finishing the game with 11 receptions for 150 yards and two scores, the Falcons still managed to beat Tampa Bay on the road, 43–28. With the win, the Falcons improved to 6–3.

==== Week 10: at Philadelphia Eagles ====
Week Ten: Atlanta Falcons at Philadelphia Eagles – Game summary

| Quarter | 1 | 2 | 3 | 4 | Total |
|---|---|---|---|---|---|
| Falcons | 0 | 6 | 3 | 6 | **15** |
| **Eagles** | 7 | 0 | 3 | 14 | **24** |

at Lincoln Financial Field, Philadelphia, Pennsylvania

- Date: November 13
- Game time: 1:00 pm. EST
- Game weather: 58 °F (14 °C), sunny
- Game attendance: 69,596
- Referee: Craig Wrolstad
- TV announcers (Fox): Kevin Burkhardt, John Lynch and Pam Oliver
- Recap, Gamebook

Game information

**First quarter**

- PHI – Ryan Mathews 4-yard run (Caleb Sturgis kick), 4:17. Eagles 7–0. **Drive: 12 plays, 81 yards, 7:14.**

**Second quarter**

- ATL – Matt Bryant 38-yard field goal, 9:36. Eagles 7–3. **Drive: 6 plays, 46 yards, 3:04.**
- ATL – Matt Bryant 43-yard field goal, 2:59. Eagles 7–6. **Drive: 9 plays, 50 yards, 4:36.**

**Third quarter**

- PHI – Caleb Sturgis 29-yard field goal, 8:16. Eagles 10–6. **Drive: 14 plays, 70 yards, 6:44.**
- ATL – Matt Bryant 46-yard field goal, 4:46. Eagles 10–9. **Drive: 8 plays, 47 yards, 3:30.**

**Fourth quarter**

- PHI – Caleb Sturgis 25-yard field goal, 13:50. Eagles 13–9. **Drive: 10 plays, 59 yards, 5:56.**
- ATL – Taylor Gabriel 76-yard pass from Matt Ryan (kick failed, hit left upright), 13:15. Falcons 15–13. **Drive: 2 plays, 75 yards, 0:35.**
- PHI – Ryan Mathews 5-yard run (Ryan Mathews run), 6:49. Eagles 21–15. **Drive: 8 plays, 76 yards, 3:36.**
- PHI – Caleb Sturgis 48-yard field goal, 1:57. Eagles 24–15. **Drive: 4 plays, 8 yards, 0:22.**

**Top passers**

- ATL – Matt Ryan – 18/31, 267 yards, TD, INT
- PHI – Carson Wentz – 25/36, 231 yards

**Top rushers**

- ATL – Devonta Freeman – 12 rushes, 49 yards
- PHI – Ryan Mathews: 18 rushes, 108 yards, 2 TD

**Top receivers**

- ATL – Julio Jones – 10 receptions, 134 yards
- PHI – Jordan Matthews – 6 receptions, 73 yards

With the loss, the Falcons dropped to 6–4.

==== Week 12: vs. Arizona Cardinals ====
Week Twelve: Arizona Cardinals at Atlanta Falcons – Game summary

| Quarter | 1 | 2 | 3 | 4 | Total |
|---|---|---|---|---|---|
| Cardinals | 7 | 6 | 0 | 6 | **19** |
| **Falcons** | 7 | 10 | 7 | 14 | **38** |

at Georgia Dome, Atlanta, Georgia

- Date: November 27
- Game time: 1:00 pm. EST
- Game weather: Played indoors (dome stadium)
- Game attendance: 69,233
- Referee: John Parry
- TV announcers (Fox): Kevin Burkhardt, John Lynch and Pam Oliver
- Recap, Gamebook

Game information

**First quarter**

- ARI – Jermaine Gresham 1-yard pass from Carson Palmer (Chandler Catanzaro kick), 9:39. Cardinals 7–0. **Drive: 9 plays, 75 yards, 5:21.**
- ATL – Devonta Freeman 1-yard run (Matt Bryant kick), 3:38. Tied 7–7. **Drive: 11 plays, 72 yards, 6:01.**

**Second quarter**

- ARI – Chandler Catanzaro 25-yard field goal, 12:52. Cardinals 10–7. **Drive: 11 plays, 68 yards, 5:46.**
- ATL – Matt Bryant 45-yard field goal, 8:30. Tied 10–10. **Drive: 9 plays, 48 yards, 4:22.**
- ATL – Taylor Gabriel 35-yard pass from Matt Ryan (Matt Bryant kick), 2:19. Falcons 17–10. **Drive: 2 plays, 45 yards, 0:51.**
- ARI – Chandler Catanzaro 54-yard field goal, 0:00. Falcons 17–13. **Drive: 4 plays, 27 yards, 0:25.**

**Third quarter**

- ATL – Tevin Coleman 2-yard run (Matt Bryant kick), 2:56. Falcons 24–13. **Drive: 13 plays, 77 yards, 6:05.**

**Fourth quarter**

- ATL – Taylor Gabriel 25-yard pass from Matt Ryan (Matt Bryant kick), 8:48. Falcons 31–13. **Drive: 10 plays, 60 yards, 5:29.**
- ARI – David Johnson 3-yard pass from Carson Palmer (pass failed), 4:44. Falcons 31–19. **Drive: 13 plays, 75 yards, 4:04.**
- ATL – Devonta Freeman 5-yard run (Matt Bryant kick), 2:07. Falcons 38–19. **Drive: 6 plays, 46 yards, 2:37.**

**Top passers**

- ARI – Carson Palmer – 25/45, 289 yards, 2 TD, INT
- ATL – Matt Ryan – 26/34, 269 yards, 2 TD, INT

**Top rushers**

- ARI – David Johnson – 13 rushes, 58 yards
- ATL – Devonta Freeman – 16 rushes, 60 yards, 2 TD

**Top receivers**

- ARI – David Johnson – 8 receptions, 103 yards, TD
- ATL – Taylor Gabriel – 4 receptions, 75 yards, 2 TD

With the impressive win, the Falcons improved to 7–4.

==== Week 13: vs. Kansas City Chiefs ====
Week Thirteen: Kansas City Chiefs at Atlanta Falcons – Game summary

| Quarter | 1 | 2 | 3 | 4 | Total |
|---|---|---|---|---|---|
| **Chiefs** | 6 | 14 | 7 | 2 | **29** |
| Falcons | 10 | 6 | 0 | 12 | **28** |

at Georgia Dome, Atlanta, Georgia

- Date: December 4
- Game time: 1:00 pm. EST
- Game weather: Played indoors (dome stadium)
- Game attendance: 69,879
- Referee: Walt Coleman
- TV announcers (CBS): Greg Gumbel, Trent Green and Jamie Erdahl
- Recap, Gamebook

Game information

**First quarter**

- ATL – Devonta Freeman 1-yard run (Matt Bryant kick), 10:02. Falcons 7–0. **Drive: 10 plays, 81 yards, 4:58.**
- KC – Spencer Ware 3-yard run (kick blocked), 8:00. Falcons 7–6. **Drive: 4 plays, 72 yards, 2:02.**
- ATL – Matt Bryant 22-yard field goal, 5:11. Falcons 10–6. **Drive: 5 plays, 71 yards, 2:49.**

**Second quarter**

- ATL – Matt Bryant 22-yard field goal, 13:25. Falcons 13–6. **Drive: 11 plays, 53 yards, 4:26.**
- KC – Spencer Ware 3-yard pass from Alex Smith (Cairo Santos kick), 7:05. Tied 13–13. **Drive: 11 plays, 92 yards, 6:20.**
- KC – Eric Berry 37-yard interception return (Cairo Santos kick), 0:37. Chiefs 20–13.
- ATL – Matt Bryant 59-yard field goal, 0:00. Chiefs 20–16. **Drive: 5 plays, 33 yards, 0:37.**

**Third quarter**

- KC – Albert Wilson 55-yard run (Cairo Santos kick), 12:52. Chiefs 27–16. **Drive: 4 plays, 64 yards, 2:08.**

**Fourth quarter**

- ATL – Devonta Freeman 1-yard run (pass failed), 11:57. Chiefs 27–22. **Drive: 11 plays, 80 yards, 6:12.**
- ATL – Aldrick Robinson 5-yard pass from Matt Ryan, 4:32. Falcons 28–27. **Drive: 10 plays, 80 yards, 4:53.**
- KC – Eric Berry defensive two-point conversion, 4:32. Chiefs 29–28.

**Top passers**

- KC – Alex Smith – 21/25, 270 yards, TD
- ATL – Matt Ryan – 22/34, 297 yards, TD, INT

**Top rushers**

- KC – Albert Wilson – 1 rush, 55 yards, TD
- ATL – Devonta Freeman – 15 rushes, 56 yards, 2 TD

**Top receivers**

- KC – Travis Kelce – 8 receptions, 140 yards
- ATL – Julio Jones – 7 receptions, 113 yards

The Falcons trailed 27–16 going into the fourth quarter, and took the lead through a 1-yard touchdown run by Devonta Freeman, followed by a 5-yard pass from Matt Ryan to Aldrick Robinson. Having failed on the two-point conversion following Freeman's touchdown, they tried for two points again after Robinson's catch with the aim of securing a three-point lead going into the last four minutes of the game; however, Chiefs safety Eric Berry intercepted Ryan's attempted pass and returned it all the way to the Atlanta end zone for a defensive two-point conversion that gave Kansas City a 29–28 lead that they were able to defend for the remainder of the game. With the loss, the Falcons dropped to 7–5 for the first time since 2011.

==== Week 14: at Los Angeles Rams ====
Week Fourteen: Atlanta Falcons at Los Angeles Rams – Game summary

| Quarter | 1 | 2 | 3 | 4 | Total |
|---|---|---|---|---|---|
| **Falcons** | 7 | 14 | 21 | 0 | **42** |
| Rams | 0 | 0 | 0 | 14 | **14** |

at Los Angeles Memorial Coliseum, Los Angeles, California

- Date: December 11
- Game time: 4:25 pm. EST/1:25 pm. PST
- Game weather: 65 °F (18 °C), cloudy
- Game attendance: 82,495
- Referee: Clete Blakeman
- TV announcers (Fox): Dick Stockton, David Diehl and Kristina Pink
- Recap, Gamebook

Game information

**First quarter**

- ATL – Justin Hardy 3-yard pass from Matt Ryan (Matt Bryant kick), 14:50. Falcons 7–0. **Drive: 1 play, 3 yards, 0:10.**

**Second quarter**

- ATL – Tevin Coleman 6-yard pass from Matt Ryan (Matt Bryant kick), 14:53. Falcons 14–0. **Drive: 9 plays, 88 yards, 3:05.**
- ATL – Deion Jones 33-yard interception return (Matt Bryant kick), 8:54. Falcons 21–0.

**Third quarter**

- ATL – Taylor Gabriel 64-yard pass from Matt Ryan (Matt Bryant kick), 13:18. Falcons 28–0. **Drive: 3 plays, 75 yards, 1:42.**
- ATL – Tevin Coleman 6-yard run (Matt Bryant kick), 3:56. Falcons 35–0. **Drive: 8 plays, 54 yards, 4:29.**
- ATL – Vic Beasley 21-yard fumble return (Matt Bryant kick), 2:50. Falcons 42–0.

**Fourth quarter**

- LA – Todd Gurley 3-yard run (Greg Zuerlein kick), 14:57. Falcons 42–7. **Drive: 8 plays, 60 yards, 2:53.**
- LA – Jared Goff 2-yard run (Greg Zuerlein kick), 2:44. Falcons 42–14. **Drive: 13 plays, 80 yards, 4:59.**

**Top passers**

- ATL – Matt Ryan – 18/28, 237 yards, 3 TD
- LA – Jared Goff – 24/41, 235 yards, 2 INT

**Top rushers**

- ATL – Tevin Coleman – 8 rushes, 36 yards, TD
- LA – Todd Gurley – 16 rushes, 61 yards, TD

**Top receivers**

- ATL – Taylor Gabriel – 3 receptions, 82 yards, TD
- LA – Kenny Britt – 7 receptions, 82 yards

With the win, the Falcons improved to 8–5.

==== Week 15: vs. San Francisco 49ers ====
Week Fifteen: San Francisco 49ers at Atlanta Falcons – Game summary

| Quarter | 1 | 2 | 3 | 4 | Total |
|---|---|---|---|---|---|
| 49ers | 0 | 13 | 0 | 0 | **13** |
| **Falcons** | 21 | 7 | 10 | 3 | **41** |

at Georgia Dome, Atlanta, Georgia

- Date: December 18
- Game time: 4:05 pm. EST
- Game weather: Played indoors (dome stadium)
- Game attendance: 70,164
- Referee: Gene Steratore
- TV announcers (Fox): Thom Brennaman, Charles Davis, Chris Spielman and Peter Schrager
- Recap, Gamebook

Game information

**First quarter**

- ATL – Devonta Freeman 5-yard run (Matt Bryant kick), 10:31. Falcons 7–0. **Drive: 6 plays, 47 yards, 2:57.**
- ATL – Taylor Gabriel 9-yard pass from Matt Ryan (Matt Bryant kick), 7:40. Falcons 14–0. **Drive: 5 plays, 50 yards, 1:58.**
- ATL – Austin Hooper 9-yard pass from Matt Ryan (Matt Bryant kick), 0:40. Falcons 21–0. **Drive: 11 plays, 55 yards, 5:51.**

**Second quarter**

- SF – Garrett Celek 16-yard pass from Colin Kaepernick (Phil Dawson kick), 12:45. Falcons 21–7. **Drive: 6 plays, 75 yards, 2:55.**
- ATL – Devonta Freeman 9-yard run (Matt Bryant kick), 4:28. Falcons 28–7. **Drive: 6 plays, 94 yards, 3:32.**
- SF – Rod Streater 5-yard pass from Colin Kaepernick (kick failed, wide left), 0:13. Falcons 28–13. **Drive: 13 plays, 75 yards, 4:15.**

**Third quarter**

- ATL – Matt Bryant 50-yard field goal, 6:29. Falcons 31–13. **Drive: 6 plays, 25 yards, 2:50.**
- ATL – Devonta Freeman 34-yard run (Matt Bryant kick), 1:42. Falcons 38–13. **Drive: 4 plays, 77 yards, 2:16.**

**Fourth quarter**

- ATL – Matt Bryant 41-yard field goal, 1:09. Falcons 41–13. **Drive: 8 plays, 68 yards, 5:06.**

**Top passers**

- SF – Colin Kaepernick – 20/33, 183 yards, 2 TD
- ATL – Matt Ryan – 17/23, 286 yards, 2 TD

**Top rushers**

- SF – Carlos Hyde – 13 rushes, 71 yards
- ATL – Devonta Freeman – 20 rushes, 139 yards, 3 TD

**Top receivers**

- SF – Blake Bell – 1 reception, 45 yards
- ATL – Aldrick Robinson – 4 receptions, 111 yards

With the win, the Falcons improved to 9–5.

==== Week 16: at Carolina Panthers ====
Week Sixteen: Atlanta Falcons at Carolina Panthers – Game summary

| Quarter | 1 | 2 | 3 | 4 | Total |
|---|---|---|---|---|---|
| **Falcons** | 13 | 7 | 3 | 10 | **33** |
| Panthers | 0 | 3 | 10 | 3 | **16** |

at Bank of America Stadium, Charlotte, North Carolina

- Date: December 24
- Game time: 1:00 pm. EST
- Game weather: 56 °F (13 °C), cloudy
- Game attendance: 73,549
- Referee: Bill Vinovich
- TV announcers (Fox): Thom Brennaman, Charles Davis, Chris Spielman and Peter Schrager
- Recap, Gamebook

Game information

**First quarter**

- ATL – Joshua Perkins 26-yard pass from Matt Ryan (Matt Bryant kick), 10:57. Falcons 7–0. **Drive: 8 plays, 75 yards, 4:03.**
- ATL – Matt Bryant 51-yard field goal, 6:09. Falcons 10–0. **Drive: 5 plays, 12 yards, 2:18.**
- ATL – Matt Bryant 48-yard field goal, 0:35. Falcons 13–0. **Drive: 7 plays, 44 yards, 4:03.**

**Second quarter**

- CAR – Graham Gano 31-yard field goal, 10:17. Falcons 13–3. **Drive: 6 plays, 31 yards, 1:32.**
- ATL – D. J. Tialavea 1-yard pass from Matt Ryan (Matt Bryant kick), 5:34. Falcons 20–3. **Drive: 11 plays, 75 yards, 4:43.**

**Third quarter**

- CAR – Graham Gano 40-yard field goal, 9:23. Falcons 20–6. **Drive: 13 plays, 53 yards, 5:37.**
- ATL – Matt Bryant 29-yard field goal, 3:34. Falcons 23–6. **Drive: 10 plays, 64 yards, 5:49.**
- CAR – Kelvin Benjamin 26-yard pass from Cam Newton (Graham Gano kick), 0:00. Falcons 23–13. **Drive: 8 plays, 56 yards, 3:34.**

**Fourth quarter**

- ATL – Tevin Coleman 55-yard run (Matt Bryant kick), 13:19. Falcons 30–13. **Drive: 4 plays, 75 yards, 1:41.**
- CAR – Graham Gano 31-yard field goal, 9:43. Falcons 30–16. **Drive: 11 plays, 62 yards, 3:36.**
- ATL – Matt Bryant 50-yard field goal, 1:55. Falcons 33–16. **Drive: 4 plays, 3 yards, 1:45.**

**Top passers**

- ATL – Matt Ryan – 27/33, 277 yards, 2 TD
- CAR – Cam Newton – 18/43, 198 yards, TD, 2 INT

**Top rushers**

- ATL – Tevin Coleman – 9 rushes, 90 yards, TD
- CAR – Jonathan Stewart – 11 rushes, 50 yards

**Top receivers**

- ATL – Julio Jones – 4 receptions, 60 yards
- CAR – Kelvin Benjamin – 4 receptions, 63 yards

With the win, alongside the Saints win over the Buccaneers, the Falcons improved to 10–5 (4-1 against the NFC South) and clinched the NFC South for the first time since 2012 and finished 6-2 on the road. As of 2025, this marks the last time Atlanta clinched the NFC South.

==== Week 17: vs. New Orleans Saints ====
Week Seventeen: New Orleans Saints at Atlanta Falcons – Game summary

| Quarter | 1 | 2 | 3 | 4 | Total |
|---|---|---|---|---|---|
| Saints | 10 | 3 | 0 | 19 | **32** |
| **Falcons** | 14 | 21 | 3 | 0 | **38** |

at Georgia Dome, Atlanta, Georgia

- Date: January 1, 2017
- Game time: 4:25 pm. EST
- Game weather: Played indoors (dome stadium)
- Game attendance: 70,835
- Referee: Ronald Torbert
- TV announcers (Fox): Kenny Albert, Daryl Johnston and Laura Okmin
- Recap, Gamebook

Game information

**First quarter**

- ATL – Tevin Coleman 7-yard pass from Matt Ryan (Matt Bryant kick), 11:55. Falcons 7–0. **Drive: 4 plays, 68 yards, 2:11.**
- NO – Wil Lutz 19-yard field goal, 3:53. Falcons 7–3. **Drive: 15 plays, 74 yards, 8:02.**
- ATL – Devonta Freeman 75-yard run (Matt Bryant kick), 3:42. Falcons 14–3. **Drive: 1 play, 75 yards, 0:11.**
- NO – Tim Hightower 2-yard run (Wil Lutz kick), 0:52. Falcons 14–10. **Drive: 7 plays, 75 yards, 2:50.**

**Second quarter**

- ATL – Julio Jones 1-yard pass from Matt Ryan (Matt Bryant kick), 14:17. Falcons 21–10. **Drive: 4 plays, 75 yards, 1:35.**
- ATL – Mohamed Sanu 10-yard pass from Matt Ryan (Matt Bryant kick), 6:51. Falcons 28–10. **Drive: 10 plays, 76 yards, 5:41.**
- NO – Wil Lutz 40-yard field goal, 3:40. Falcons 28–13. **Drive: 7 plays, 53 yards, 3:11.**
- ATL – Justin Hardy 7-yard pass from Matt Ryan (Matt Bryant kick), 0:32. Falcons 35–13. **Drive: 9 plays, 75 yards, 3:08.**

**Third quarter**

- ATL – Matt Bryant 22-yard field goal, 5:17. Falcons 38–13. **Drive: 14 plays, 95 yards, 5:06.**

**Fourth quarter**

- NO – Michael Thomas 14-yard pass from Drew Brees (run failed), 12:41. Falcons 38–19. **Drive: 7 plays, 89 yards, 2:11.**
- NO – Mark Ingram II 1-yard run (pass failed), 2:47. Falcons 38–25. **Drive: 5 plays, 50 yards, 2:18.**
- NO – Travaris Cadet 3-yard pass from Drew Brees (Wil Lutz kick), 0:39. Falcons 38–32. **Drive: 13 plays, 57 yards, 2:08.**

**Top passers**

- NO – Drew Brees – 29/50, 350 yards, 2 TD, INT
- ATL – Matt Ryan – 27/36, 331 yards, 4 TD

**Top rushers**

- NO – Mark Ingram II – 20 rushes, 103 yards, TD
- ATL – Devonta Freeman – 12 rushes, 96 yards, TD

**Top receivers**

- NO – Michael Thomas – 10 receptions, 156 yards, TD
- ATL – Julio Jones – 7 receptions, 96 yards, TD

This was the Falcons' final regular season game at the Georgia Dome. With the win, the Falcons finished their season at 11–5 (5–1 against the NFC South) and clinched the #2 in the NFC. Atlanta finished 5–3 at home.

== Postseason ==
=== Schedule ===
| Round | Date | Opponent (seed) | Result | Record | Venue | Recap |
|---|---|---|---|---|---|---|
| Wild Card | First-round bye | | | | | |
| Divisional | January 14, 2017 | Seattle Seahawks (3) | W 36–20 | 1–0 | Georgia Dome | Recap |
| NFC Championship | January 22, 2017 | Green Bay Packers (4) | W 44–21 | 2–0 | Georgia Dome | Recap |
| Super Bowl LI | February 5, 2017 | vs. New England Patriots (A1) | L 28–34 (OT) | 2–1 | NRG Stadium | Recap |

=== Game summaries ===
==== NFC Divisional Playoffs: vs. (3) Seattle Seahawks ====
NFC Divisional Playoffs: (3) Seattle Seahawks at (2) Atlanta Falcons – Game summary

| Quarter | 1 | 2 | 3 | 4 | Total |
|---|---|---|---|---|---|
| Seahawks | 7 | 3 | 3 | 7 | 20 |
| Falcons | 0 | 19 | 7 | 10 | 36 |

at Georgia Dome, Atlanta, Georgia

- Date: January 14, 2017
- Game time: 4:35 p.m. EST
- Game weather: Played indoors (dome stadium)
- Game attendance: 71,155
- Referee: Gene Steratore
- TV announcers (Fox): Kevin Burkhardt, John Lynch, Pam Oliver and Peter Schrager
- Recap, Gamebook

Game information

First quarter

- SEA – Jimmy Graham 7-yard pass from Russell Wilson (Steven Hauschka kick), 6:26. Seahawks 7–0. Drive: 14 plays, 89 yards, 8:34.

Second quarter

- ATL – Julio Jones 7-yard pass from Matt Ryan (Matt Bryant kick), 14:14. Tied 7–7. Drive: 13 plays, 75 yards, 7:12.
- SEA – Steven Hauschka 33-yard field goal, 11:20. Seahawks 10–7. Drive: 6 plays, 40 yards, 2:54.
- ATL – Russell Wilson sacked in endzone by Ben Garland for a safety, 9:22. Seahawks 10–9.
- ATL – Matt Bryant 35-yard field goal, 6:06. Falcons 12–10. Drive: 5 plays, 40 yards, 3:16.
- ATL – Tevin Coleman 14-yard pass from Matt Ryan (Matt Bryant kick), 0:53. Falcons 19–10. Drive: 9 plays, 99 yards, 2:55.

Third quarter

- ATL – Devonta Freeman 1-yard run (Matt Bryant kick), 9:12. Falcons 26–10. Drive: 13 plays, 75 yards, 5:48.
- SEA – Steven Hauschka 26-yard field goal, 3:03. Falcons 26–13. Drive: 14 plays, 80 yards, 6:09.

Fourth quarter

- ATL – Matt Bryant 31-yard field goal, 14:57. Falcons 29–13. Drive: 7 plays, 62 yards, 3:06.
- ATL – Mohamed Sanu 3-yard pass from Matt Ryan (Matt Bryant kick), 3:40. Falcons 36–13. Drive: 8 plays, 46 yards, 4:36.
- SEA – Doug Baldwin 31-yard pass from Russell Wilson (Steven Hauschka kick), 3:21. Falcons 36–20. Drive: 1 plays, 31 yards, 0:19.

Top passers

- SEA – Russell Wilson – 17/30, 225 yards, 2 TD, 2 INT
- ATL – Matt Ryan – 26/37, 338 yards, 3 TD

Top rushers

- SEA – Russell Wilson – 6 rushes, 49 yards
- ATL – Tevin Coleman – 11 rushes, 57 yards

Top receivers

- SEA – Doug Baldwin – 5 receptions, 80 yards, TD
- ATL – Julio Jones – 6 receptions, 67 yards, TD

After coming off a first round bye, the Falcons hosted the Seahawks in the divisional round of the playoffs. The Falcons trailed midway through the first quarter when the Seahawks went up 7–0 from a 7-yard touchdown pass from Russell Wilson to Jimmy Graham. In the second quarter, Atlanta tied the game 7–7 on a 7-yard touchdown pass from Matt Ryan to Julio Jones. On the next Seattle drive, the Seahawks took a 10–7 lead with a 33-yard field goal from Steven Hauschka.

The next Falcons drive ended in a three and out. On the ensuing punt, Seattle's Devin Hester returned the punt 80-yards to Atlanta's 7-yard line. However, that punt return was called back on a penalty, forcing Seattle to start at its own 7-yard line. After Thomas Rawls was tackled for a 3-yard loss, Wilson attempted to drop back to pass. However, while doing so, Wilson tripped over Rees Odhiambo's foot and was tackled in the end zone, leading to a safety for Atlanta. Receiving the ball following the safety, Atlanta took its first lead of the game on a 35-yard field goal from Matt Bryant. After forcing Seattle to Punt, the Falcons took a 19–10 lead going into halftime on a 14-yard touchdown pass to Tevin Coleman.

Atlanta remained ahead for the rest of the game, eventually beating Seattle 36–20. With the win, the Falcons improved their record to 12–5. Matt Ryan threw for 338 yards and 3 touchdowns and improved his playoff record to 2–4, with both of his playoff wins (up to that point) coming against the Seahawks. This was speculated to be the last NFL game ever in the Georgia Dome, but when the fourth-seeded Green Bay Packers upset the top-seeded Dallas Cowboys in the other Divisional Playoff the next day, Atlanta was named the host of the NFC Championship Game, the last ever game in the Dome.

==== NFC Championship: vs. (4) Green Bay Packers ====
NFC Championship Game: (4) Green Bay Packers at (2) Atlanta Falcons – Game summary

| Quarter | 1 | 2 | 3 | 4 | Total |
|---|---|---|---|---|---|
| Packers | 0 | 0 | 15 | 6 | 21 |
| Falcons | 10 | 14 | 13 | 7 | 44 |

at Georgia Dome, Atlanta, Georgia

- Date: January 22, 2017
- Game time: 3:05 pm. EST
- Game weather: Played indoors (dome stadium)
- Game attendance: 71,127
- Referee: Bill Vinovich
- TV announcers (Fox): Joe Buck, Troy Aikman, Erin Andrews and Chris Myers
- Recap, Gamebook

Game information

First quarter

- ATL – Mohamed Sanu 2-yard pass from Matt Ryan (Matt Bryant kick), 8:24. Falcons 7–0. Drive: 13 plays, 80 yards, 6:36.
- ATL – Matt Bryant 28-yard field goal, 0:14. Falcons 10–0. Drive: 12 plays, 59 yards, 5:21.

Second quarter

- ATL – Matt Ryan 14-yard run (Matt Bryant kick), 7:24. Falcons 17–0. Drive: 9 plays, 80 yards, 3:35.
- ATL – Julio Jones 5-yard pass from Matt Ryan (Matt Bryant kick), 0:03. Falcons 24–0. Drive: 9 plays, 68 yards, 1:47.

Third quarter

- ATL – Julio Jones 73-yard pass from Matt Ryan (Matt Bryant kick), 13:51. Falcons 31–0. Drive: 2 plays, 75 yards, 0:51.
- GB – Davante Adams 2-yard pass from Aaron Rodgers (Mason Crosby kick), 9:19. Falcons 31–7. Drive: 12 plays, 75 yards, 4:32.
- ATL – Devonta Freeman 4-yard pass from Matt Ryan (kick failed, wide right), 4:11. Falcons 37–7. Drive: 8 plays, 75 yards, 5:08.
- GB – Jordy Nelson 3-yard pass from Aaron Rodgers (Aaron Ripkowski run), 0:38. Falcons 37–15. Drive: 9 plays, 75 yards, 3:33.

Fourth quarter

- ATL – Tevin Coleman 3-yard run (Matt Bryant kick), 12:07. Falcons 44–15. Drive: 7 plays, 33 yards, 3:31.
- GB – Jared Cook 1-yard pass from Aaron Rodgers (run failed), 6:43. Falcons 44–21. Drive: 14 plays, 75 yards, 5:24.

Top passers

- GB – Aaron Rodgers – 27/45, 287 yards, 3 TD, INT
- ATL – Matt Ryan – 27/38, 392 yards, 4 TD

Top rushers

- GB – Aaron Rodgers – 4 rushes, 46 yards
- ATL – Devonta Freeman – 14 rushes, 42 yards

Top receivers

- GB – Jared Cook – 7 receptions, 78 yards, TD
- ATL – Julio Jones – 9 receptions, 180 yards, 2 TD

This was the Falcons' final game ever in the Georgia Dome after 25 seasons, as the team moved into the Mercedes-Benz Stadium in 2017. The Falcons never trailed in the game, scoring 31 unanswered points until Rodgers threw a touchdown pass halfway through the third quarter to give Green Bay its first points. The Falcons won 44–21 to advance to the Super Bowl for the first time since their 1998 season, as well as the second time in franchise history. Matt Ryan had a big game, throwing 4 touchdown passes and running for another score. His 392 yards were the second-most ever thrown in a Championship Game, only behind his 396 yards in the 2012 NFC Championship Games versus the San Francisco 49ers. Julio Jones was another huge part of the Falcons win, with 9 catches, 180 yards and 2 touchdowns. One of the scores came on a 73-yard tackle-breaking catch. The Falcons' defense held fellow MVP-candidate Rodgers and his offense in check most of the game, forcing several hurries and drops. They also forced 2 turnovers, one was a fumble that was forced and then recovered by Jalen Collins on Packers Aaron Ripkowski, and the other one of them coming on a 3rd and 21 pass by Rodgers, that Ricardo Allen intercepted.

==== Super Bowl LI: vs. New England Patriots ====
Super Bowl LI: New England Patriots vs. Atlanta Falcons – Game summary

| Quarter | 1 | 2 | 3 | 4 | OT | Total |
|---|---|---|---|---|---|---|
| Patriots | 0 | 3 | 6 | 19 | 6 | 34 |
| Falcons | 0 | 21 | 7 | 0 | 0 | 28 |

at NRG Stadium, Houston, Texas

- Date: February 5, 2017
- Game time: 6:30 pm. EST/5:30 p.m. CST
- Game weather: Played indoors (retractable roof closed)
- Game attendance: 70,807
- Referee: Carl Cheffers
- TV announcers (Fox): Joe Buck, Troy Aikman, Erin Andrews and Chris Myers
- Recap, Gamebook

Game information

First quarter

- None.

Second quarter

- ATL – Devonta Freeman 5-yard run (Matt Bryant kick), 12:15. Falcons 7–0. Drive: 5 plays, 71 yards, 1:53.
- ATL – Austin Hooper 19-yard pass from Matt Ryan (Matt Bryant kick), 8:48. Falcons 14–0. Drive: 5 plays, 62 yards, 1:49.
- ATL – Robert Alford 82-yard interception return (Matt Bryant kick), 2:21. Falcons 21–0.
- NE – Stephen Gostkowski 41-yard field goal, 0:02. Falcons 21–3. Drive: 11 plays, 52 yards, 2:19.

Third quarter

- ATL – Tevin Coleman 6-yard pass from Matt Ryan (Matt Bryant kick), 8:31. Falcons 28–3. Drive: 8 plays, 85 yards, 4:14.
- NE – James White 5-yard pass from Tom Brady (kick failed, wide right), 2:06. Falcons 28–9. Drive: 13 plays, 75 yards, 6:25.

Fourth quarter

- NE – Stephen Gostkowski 33-yard field goal, 9:44. Falcons 28–12. Drive: 12 plays, 72 yards, 5:07.
- NE – Danny Amendola 6-yard pass from Tom Brady (James White run), 5:56. Falcons 28–20. Drive: 5 plays, 25 yards, 2:28.
- NE – James White 1-yard run (Tom Brady-Danny Amendola pass), 0:57. Tied 28–28. Drive: 10 plays, 91 yards, 2:33.

Overtime

- NE – James White 2-yard run, 11:02. Patriots 34–28. Drive: 8 plays, 75 yards, 3:58.

Top passers

- NE – Tom Brady – 43/62, 466 yards, 2 TD, INT
- ATL – Matt Ryan – 17/23, 284 yards, 2 TD

Top rushers

- NE – LeGarrette Blount – 11 rushes, 31 yards
- ATL – Devonta Freeman – 11 rushes, 75 yards, TD

Top receivers

- NE – James White – 14 receptions, 110 yards, TD
- ATL – Julio Jones – 4 receptions, 87 yards

The Falcons led the game 28–3 into the third quarter before the Patriots scored 25 unanswered points to tie at 28 all, and create the first Super Bowl game to go into overtime. The Patriots won the coin-toss and won the game via a James White touchdown. This loss was their 6th to New England since 2001, and it ended the Falcons' season record at 13–6.

== Standings ==
=== Division ===
NFC South
| | W | L | T | PCT | DIV | CONF | PF | PA | STK |
|---|---|---|---|---|---|---|---|---|---|
| ^{(2)} Atlanta Falcons | 11 | 5 | 0 | .688 | 5–1 | 9–3 | 540 | 406 | W4 |
| Tampa Bay Buccaneers | 9 | 7 | 0 | .563 | 4–2 | 7–5 | 354 | 369 | W1 |
| New Orleans Saints | 7 | 9 | 0 | .438 | 2–4 | 6–6 | 469 | 454 | L1 |
| Carolina Panthers | 6 | 10 | 0 | .375 | 1–5 | 5–7 | 369 | 402 | L2 |

=== Conference ===
NFC
| # | Team | Division | W | L | T | PCT | DIV | CONF | SOS | SOV | STK |
|---|---|---|---|---|---|---|---|---|---|---|---|
Division leaders
| 1 | Dallas Cowboys | East | 13 | 3 | 0 | .813 | 3–3 | 9–3 | .471 | .440 | L1 |
| 2 | Atlanta Falcons | South | 11 | 5 | 0 | .688 | 5–1 | 9–3 | .480 | .452 | W4 |
| 3 | Seattle Seahawks | West | 10 | 5 | 1 | .656 | 3–2–1 | 6–5–1 | .441 | .425 | W1 |
| 4 | Green Bay Packers | North | 10 | 6 | 0 | .625 | 5–1 | 8–4 | .508 | .453 | W6 |
Wild Cards
| 5 | New York Giants | East | 11 | 5 | 0 | .688 | 4–2 | 8–4 | .486 | .455 | W1 |
| 6 (Note: Detroit finished ahead of Tampa Bay for the No. 6 seed and qualified for the last playoff spot based on record vs. common opponents—Detroit's cumulative record against Chicago, Dallas, Los Angeles and New Orleans was 3–2, while Tampa Bay's cumulative record against the same four teams was 2–3.) | Detroit Lions | North | 9 | 7 | 0 | .563 | 3–3 | 7–5 | .475 | .392 | L3 |
Did not qualify for the postseason
| 7 | Tampa Bay Buccaneers | South | 9 | 7 | 0 | .563 | 4–2 | 7–5 | .492 | .434 | W1 |
| 8 | Washington Redskins | East | 8 | 7 | 1 | .531 | 3–3 | 6–6 | .516 | .430 | L1 |
| 9 | Minnesota Vikings | North | 8 | 8 | 0 | .500 | 2–4 | 5–7 | .492 | .457 | W1 |
| 10 | Arizona Cardinals | West | 7 | 8 | 1 | .469 | 4–1–1 | 6–5–1 | .463 | .366 | W2 |
| 11 (Note: New Orleans finished ahead of Philadelphia based on better record vs. conference opponents.) | New Orleans Saints | South | 7 | 9 | 0 | .438 | 2–4 | 6–6 | .523 | .393 | L1 |
| 12 | Philadelphia Eagles | East | 7 | 9 | 0 | .438 | 2–4 | 5–7 | .559 | .518 | W2 |
| 13 | Carolina Panthers | South | 6 | 10 | 0 | .375 | 1–5 | 5–7 | .518 | .354 | L2 |
| 14 | Los Angeles Rams | West | 4 | 12 | 0 | .250 | 2–4 | 3–9 | .504 | .500 | L7 |
| 15 | Chicago Bears | North | 3 | 13 | 0 | .188 | 2–4 | 3–9 | .521 | .396 | L4 |
| 16 | San Francisco 49ers | West | 2 | 14 | 0 | .125 | 2–4 | 2–10 | .504 | .250 | L1 |
Tiebreakers (Note: When breaking ties for three or more teams under the NFL's rules, they are first broken within divisions, then comparing only the highest-ranked remaining team from each division.)
