= Taylor Gabriel =

American football player (born 1991)

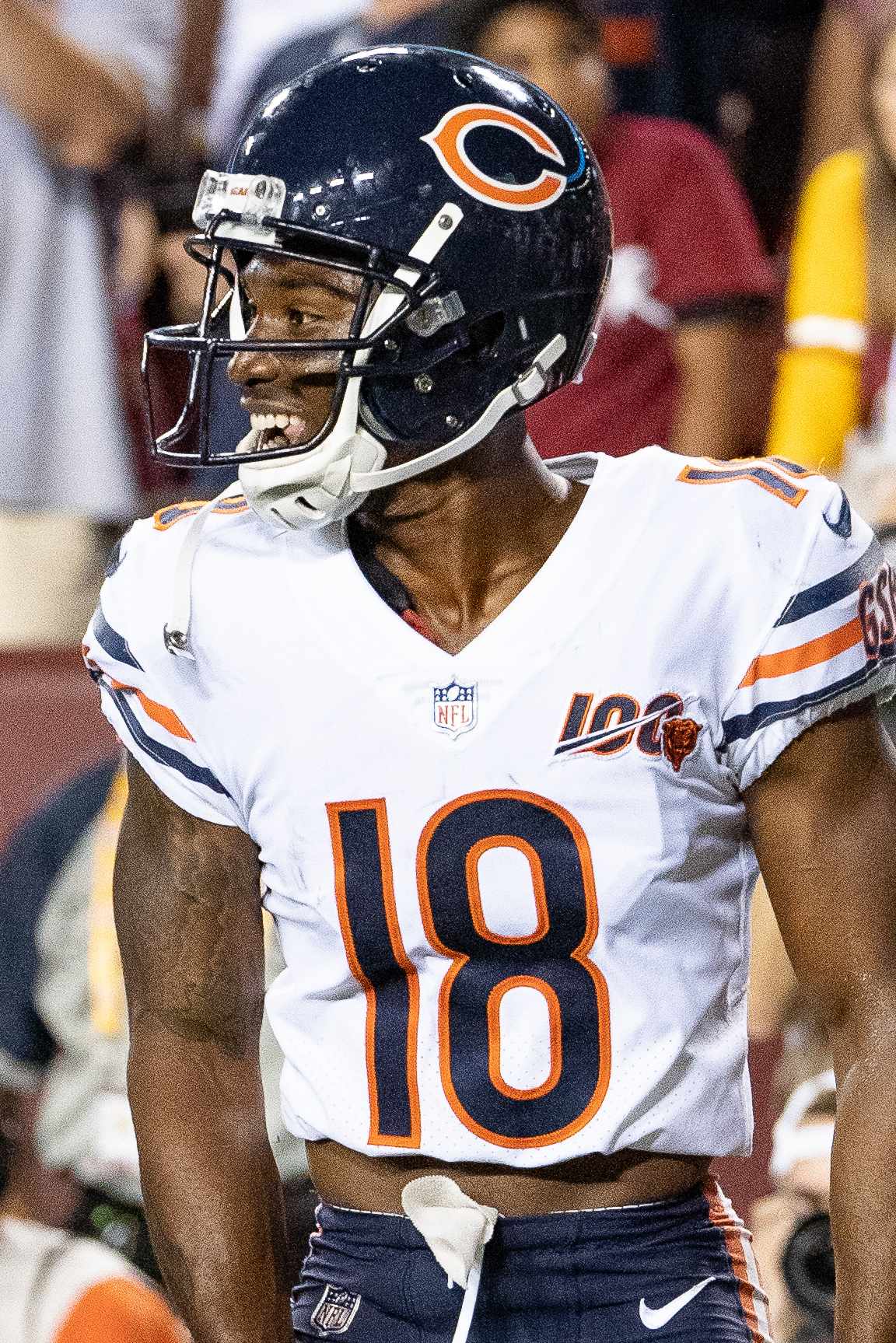
- Gabriel with the Chicago Bears in 2019

No. 18
- Position: Wide receiver

Personal information
- Born: February 17, 1991 (age 35); Dallas, Texas, U.S.
- Listed height: 5 ft 7 in (1.70 m)
- Listed weight: 168 lb (76 kg)

Career information
- High school: John Horn (Mesquite, Texas)
- College: Abilene Christian
- NFL draft: 2014: undrafted

Career history
- Cleveland Browns (2014–2015); Atlanta Falcons (2016–2017); Chicago Bears (2018–2019)

Career NFL statistics
- Receptions: 228
- Receiving yards: 2,860
- Rushing yards: 191
- Total touchdowns: 15
- Stats at Pro Football Reference

Taylor James Gabriel (born February 17, 1991) is an American former professional football player who was a wide receiver for six seasons in the National Football League (NFL). He played college football for the Abilene Christian Wildcats and signed with the Cleveland Browns as an undrafted free agent in 2014. Gabriel also played with the Atlanta Falcons and Chicago Bears.

== Early life ==
Gabriel attended John Horn High School in Mesquite, Texas, where he played football, basketball, and ran track for the Jaguars athletic teams. In football, Gabriel was a three-year letterman at wide receiver, cornerback, and kick returner. He was an All-District selection as a junior after he had 47 catches for 588 yards and four touchdowns. Gabriel earned Class 5A TSWA All-State as senior in 2008 after recording 90 receptions for 1,354 yards with 13 touchdowns for a 4–7 team with the school’s first playoff bid. He was also named APSE second team all-state and was the District 11-5A MVP.

== College career ==
Gabriel enrolled to play college football at Abilene Christian University, where he holds the record for most career touchdowns.

As a freshman in 2010, Gabriel finished with 26 receptions for 295 yards.

As a sophomore in 2011, Gabriel had 64 receptions for 988 yards and 10 touchdowns.

As a junior in 2012, Gabriel recorded with 52 receptions for 684 yards and seven touchdowns.

As a senior in 2013, Gabriel had 73 receptions for 1,060 yards and 10 touchdowns. He finished his collegiate career with 215 receptions for 3,027 yards and 27 touchdowns.

== Professional career ==
Pre-draft measurables
Height	Weight	Arm length	Hand span	40-yard dash	10-yard split	20-yard split	20-yard shuttle	Three-cone drill	Vertical jump	Broad jump	Bench press
5 ft 7 1/2 in (1.71 m)	167 lb (76 kg)	29 3/4 in (0.76 m)	8 3/8 in (0.21 m)	4.40 s	1.50 s	2.47 s	4.21 s	6.84 s	40.0 in (1.02 m)	10 ft 5 in (3.18 m)	17 reps
All values from Pro Day

=== Cleveland Browns ===
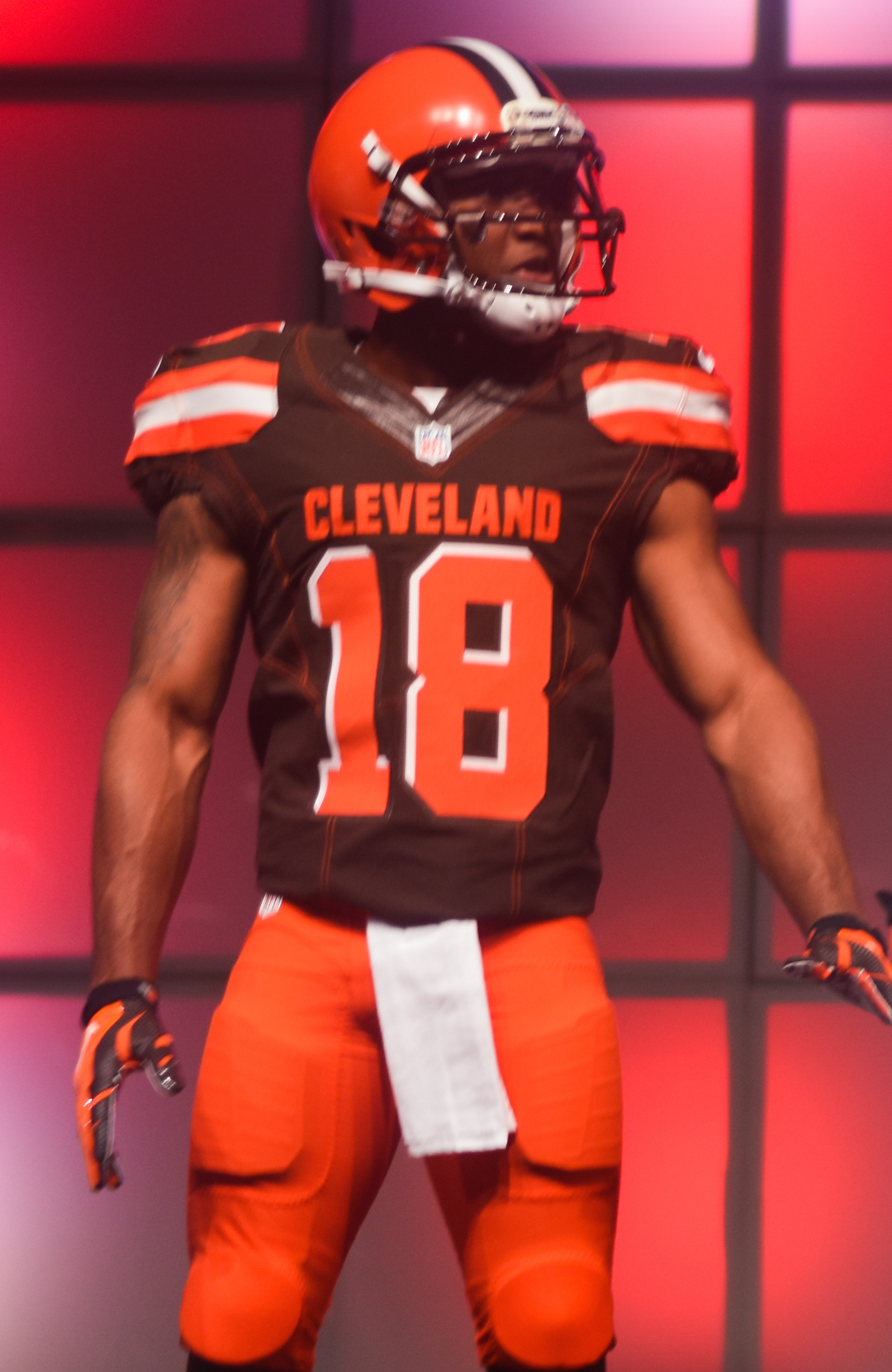
Gabriel in 2015

Gabriel was signed by the Cleveland Browns after going undrafted in the 2014 NFL draft.

Gabriel made his NFL debut on September 7, 2014, against the Pittsburgh Steelers, recording one reception for five yards. During Week 9 against the Tampa Bay Buccaneers, he caught a 34-yard pass from Brian Hoyer for his first NFL touchdown. Gabriel finished his rookie year with 36 receptions for 621 yards and a touchdown.

In the 2015 season, Gabriel recorded 28 receptions for 241 yards.

On September 3, 2016, Gabriel was released by the Browns.

=== Atlanta Falcons ===
Gabriel was claimed off waivers by the Atlanta Falcons on September 4, 2016. In Atlanta's Week 12 game against the Arizona Cardinals, he scored two touchdowns, helping to lead the Falcons to a 38–19 win. In Week 14 against the Los Angeles Rams, he had three receptions for 82 yards and scored one touchdown in the 42–14 victory. He played a significant role for the Falcons throughout the season, which resulted in an appearance in Super Bowl LI, where they lost to the New England Patriots in overtime by a score of 34–28. Gabriel had three receptions for 76 yards in the Super Bowl. Overall, in the 2016 regular season, Gabriel recorded 35 receptions for 579 yards and six touchdowns.

On March 8, 2017, the Falcons placed a second-round tender on Gabriel. He officially signed his tender on April 22. In the 2017 season, Gabriel played in 16 games with four starts, recording 33 receptions for 378 yards and a touchdown.

=== Chicago Bears ===
==== 2018 season ====
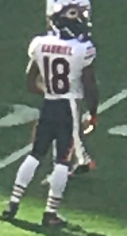
Gabriel in 2018

On March 14, 2018, Gabriel signed a four-year, $26 million contract with the Chicago Bears.

On September 9, Gabriel made his Bears debut, catching five passes for 25 yards in the season-opening 24–23 road loss to the Green Bay Packers. On September 30, 2018, he caught a season-high seven passes for 104 yards and two touchdowns in a 48–10 victory over the Tampa Bay Buccaneers. This was the second time he caught two touchdowns in a single game, the last time was with the Atlanta Falcons in 2016. On October 14, Gabriel had five receptions for 110 yards in the 31–28 overtime loss to the Miami Dolphins in Week 6.

Gabriel finished the 2018 season with the Bears with 67 catches for 688 yards and two touchdowns.

==== 2019 season ====
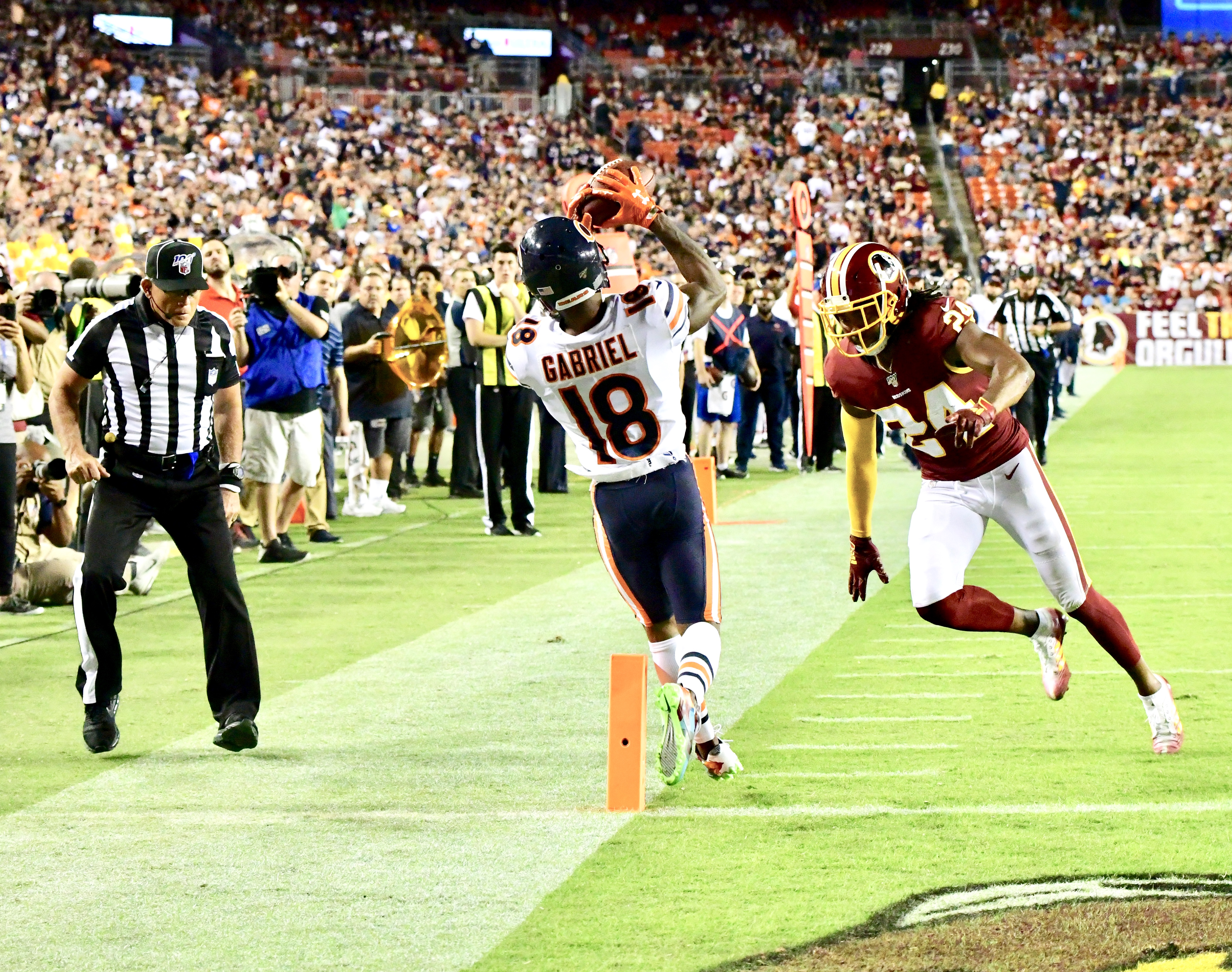
Gabriel in 2019

During Week 3 against the Washington Redskins, Gabriel caught six passes for 75 yards and three touchdowns in the 31–15 road victory, though he left the game with a concussion. He was the 35th player in NFL history to score three receiving touchdowns in the first half of a game and the first Bears player to do so in the Super Bowl era. Gabriel was also the fourth player in Bears history to accomplish the feat in one quarter after Red Pollock (1935), Frank Minini (1948), and Gale Sayers (1965). Gabriel was forced to miss the following week's game against the Minnesota Vikings. Without Gabriel, the Bears won 16–6.

Gabriel finished the 2019 season with 29 receptions for 353 yards and four touchdowns to go along with 20 rushing yards.

On February 21, 2020, Gabriel was released by the Bears after two seasons in a move to create cap space.

=== Retirement ===
On April 9, 2021, Gabriel announced his retirement.

== NFL career statistics ==
=== Regular season ===
Year	Team	Games		Receiving					Rushing					Fumbles	
Year	Team	GP	GS	Rec	Yds	Avg	Lng	TD	Att	Yds	Avg	Lng	TD	Fum	Lost
2014	CLE	16	2	36	621	17.3	70	1	4	10	2.5	8	0	0	0
2015	CLE	13	4	28	241	8.6	56	0	0	0	0	0	0	1	1
2016	ATL	13	3	35	579	16.5	76T	6	4	51	12.8	27	1	0	0
2017	ATL	16	4	33	378	11.5	40T	1	8	49	6.1	15	0	0	0
2018	CHI	16	11	67	688	10.3	54	2	9	61	6.8	20	0	1	1
2019	CHI	9	7	29	353	12.2	53	4	3	20	6.7	14	0	0	0
Total		83	31	228	2,860	12.5	76T	14	28	191	6.8	27	1	2	2

=== Postseason ===
Year	Team	Games		Receiving					Rushing					Fumbles	
Year	Team	GP	GS	Rec	Yds	Avg	Lng	TD	Att	Yds	Avg	Lng	TD	Fum	Lost
2016	ATL	3	0	9	171	19.0	37	0	1	0	0.0	0	0	1	0
2017	ATL	2	0	2	4	2.0	7	0	0	0	0.0	0	0	0	0
2018	CHI	1	1	4	37	9.3	19	0	2	20	10.0	21	0	0	0
Total		6	1	15	212	14.1	37	0	3	20	6.7	21	0	1	0
