= De'Vondre Campbell =

American football player (born 1993)

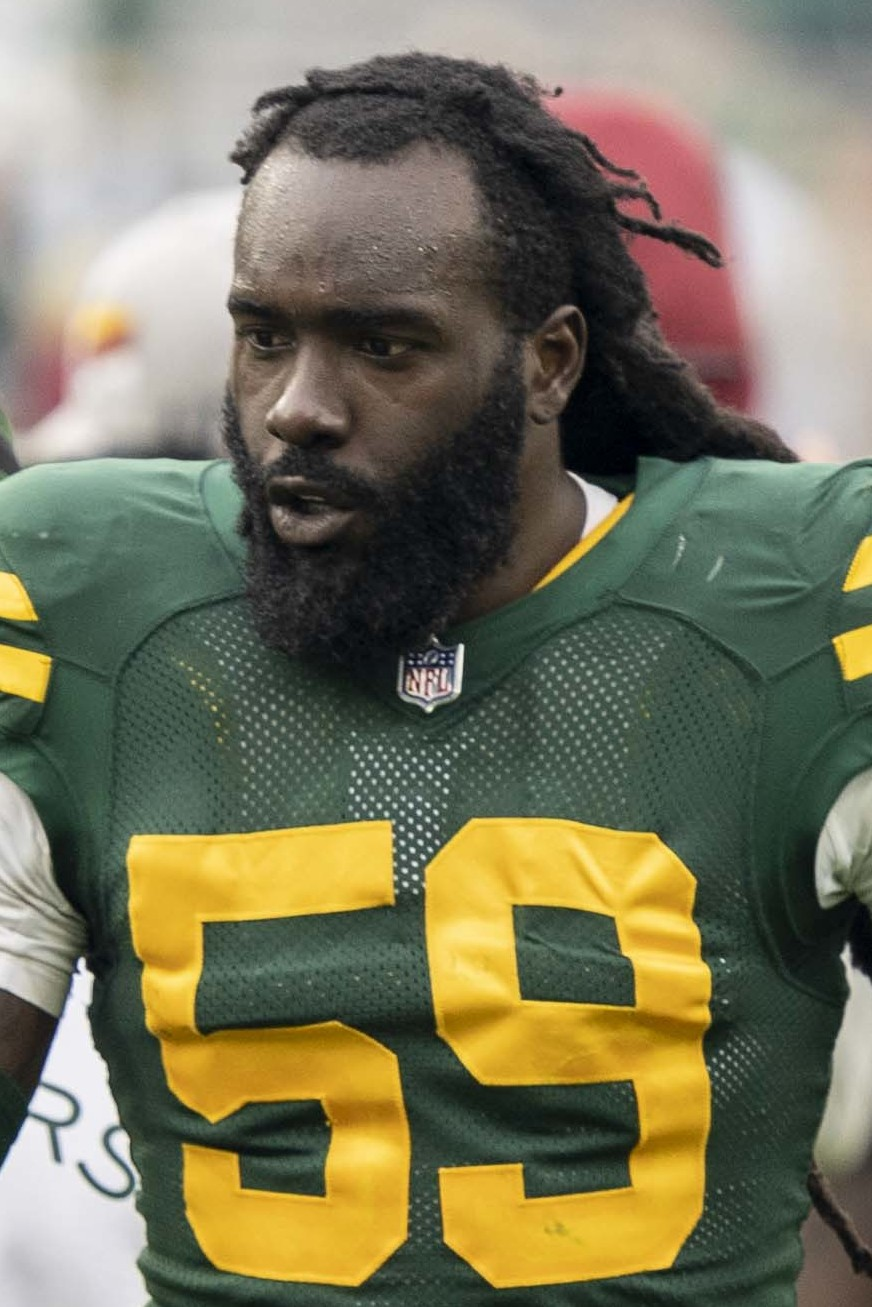
- Campbell with the Green Bay Packers in 2021

Profile
- Position: Linebacker

Personal information
- Born: July 1, 1993 (age 33); Fort Myers, Florida, U.S.
- Listed height: 6 ft 4 in (1.93 m)
- Listed weight: 232 lb (105 kg)

Career information
- High school: Cypress Lake (Fort Myers, Florida)
- College: Hutchinson CC (2012); Minnesota (2013–2015)
- NFL draft: 2016: 4th round, 115th overall pick

Career history
- Atlanta Falcons (2016–2019); Arizona Cardinals (2020); Green Bay Packers (2021–2023); San Francisco 49ers (2024)

Awards and highlights
- First-team All-Pro (2021)

Career NFL statistics as of 2024
- Total tackles: 858
- Sacks: 9.5
- Forced fumbles: 8
- Fumble recoveries: 3
- Pass deflections: 30
- Interceptions: 7
- Defensive touchdowns: 1
- Stats at Pro Football Reference

De'Vondre Campbell (born July 1, 1993) is an American former professional football player who was a linebacker in the National Football League (NFL). He played college football for the Hutchinson Blue Dragons and Minnesota Golden Gophers and was selected by the Atlanta Falcons in the fourth round of the 2016 NFL draft. Campbell has also played for the Arizona Cardinals, Green Bay Packers, and San Francisco 49ers.

== College career ==
After playing at the junior college level for Hutchinson Community College, Campbell played Minnesota Golden Gophers football from 2013 to 2015.

As a sophomore in 2013, Campbell recorded 39 total tackles, three tackles for loss, and a forced fumble.

As a junior in 2014, Campbell recorded 75 total tackles, 6.5 tackles for loss, 2.5 sacks, an interception, a pass defended, and three fumble recoveries.

In his final collegiate season in 2015, Campbell recorded 92 total tackles, 6.5 tackles for loss, four sacks, an interception, three passes defended, and two forced fumbles.

== Professional career ==
External videos
- De'Vondre Campbell's NFL Combine Workout

Pre-draft measurables
Height	Weight	Arm length	Hand span	Wingspan	40-yard dash	10-yard split	20-yard split	20-yard shuttle	Three-cone drill	Vertical jump	Broad jump	Bench press
6 ft 3 5/8 in (1.92 m)	232 lb (105 kg)	33 5/8 in (0.85 m)	9 5/8 in (0.24 m)	6 ft 8 7/8 in (2.05 m)	4.58 s	1.67 s	2.71 s	4.50 s	7.07 s	34.0 in (0.86 m)	9 ft 8 in (2.95 m)	16 reps
All values from NFL Combine/Minnesota's Pro Day

=== Atlanta Falcons ===
==== 2016 ====
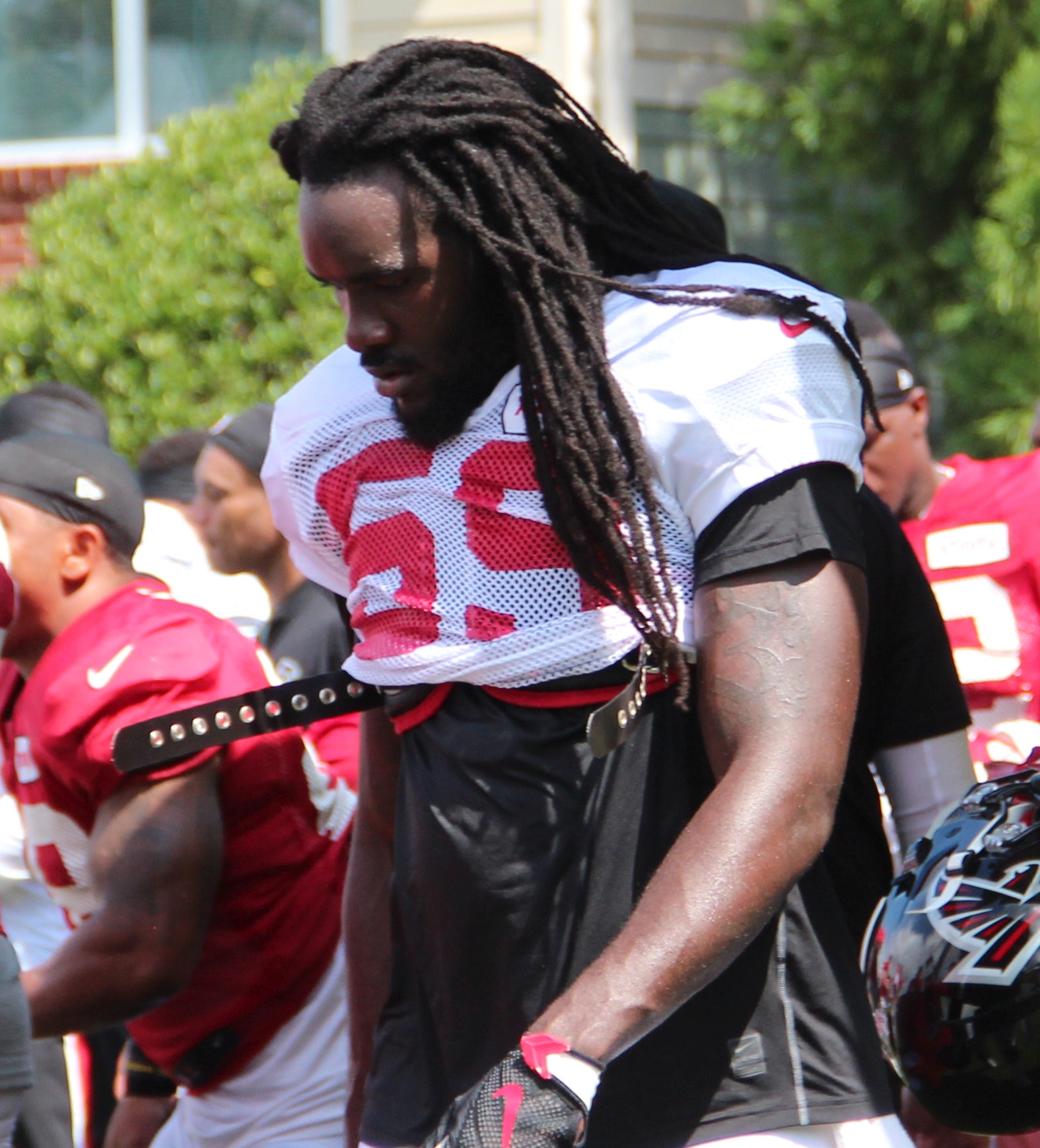
Campbell in 2016

The Atlanta Falcons selected Campbell in the fourth round (115th overall) of the 2016 NFL draft. He was the second linebacker drafted by the Falcons in 2016, behind LSU's Deion Jones. Campbell was also the 16th overall linebacker drafted in 2016. On May 5, 2016, the Falcons signed him to a four-year, $2.90 million contract that includes a signing bonus of $565,528.

External videos
- Falcons draft Campbell 115th overall

Throughout training camp, Campbell competed to be a starting outside linebacker against Sean Weatherspoon and Philip Wheeler. Head coach Dan Quinn named Campbell the starting weakside linebacker to begin the regular season, alongside Deion Jones and Vic Beasley.

Campbell made his professional regular season debut and first career start in the season-opener against the Tampa Bay Buccaneers and recorded four solo tackles during the 31–24 loss. On September 16, 2016, it was reported that Campbell had sustained an ankle injury during practice. His ankle injury sidelined him for the next four games (Weeks 2–5). On October 23, 2016, Campbell collected a season-high 10 combined tackles (six solo) during a 33–30 overtime loss to the San Diego Chargers in Week 7. During a Week 12 38–19 victory over the Arizona Cardinals in Week 12, Campbell recorded four solo tackles, made a season-high three pass deflections, and his first career interception off a pass attempt by Cardinals' quarterback Carson Palmer that was intended for tight end Jermaine Gresham to seal the victory in the fourth quarter. Campbell was inactive during the Falcons' Week 16 victory at the Carolina Panthers after suffering a concussion the previous week.

Campbell finished his rookie season with 48 combined tackles (35 solo), seven passes defensed, a forced fumble, and an interception in 11 games and 10 starts. The Falcons finished atop the NFC South with an 11–5 record in 2016 and earned a first round bye. On January 14, 2017, Campbell started his first career playoff game and recorded four combined tackles during a 36–20 victory over the Seattle Seahawks in the NFC Divisional Round. During the NFC Championship Game against the Green Bay Packers, he recorded two tackles as the Falcons won by a score of 44–21. On February 5, 2017, Campbell started in Super Bowl LI and recorded four total tackles as the Falcons were defeated 34–28 by the New England Patriots in overtime.

==== 2017 ====
On February 8, 2017, the Falcons fired defensive coordinator Richard Smith after they lost a 28–3 lead in the Super Bowl and allowed the Patriots to score 31 points in the second half of the game. Two days later, the Falcons announced their decision to promote secondary coach Marquand Manuel to defensive coordinator. Campbell entered training camp slated as the starting strongside linebacker after Vic Beasley was moved closer to an edge rushing defensive end role. Head coach Dan Quinn named Campbell the starting strongside linebacker to begin the regular season, alongside weakside linebacker Duke Riley and middle linebacker Deion Jones.

On September 17, 2017, Campbell recorded eight combined tackles, deflected a pass, and made his first NFL sack on Packers' quarterback Aaron Rodgers during a 34–23 victory over the Packers. In Week 10, Campbell collected a season-high 13 combined tackles in a 27–7 victory against the Dallas Cowboys. Campbell started in all 16 games in 2017 and recorded 92 combined tackles (61 solo), four pass deflections, and two sacks.

==== 2018 ====
Campbell returned as the starting strongside linebacker to begin 2018, along with Duke Riley and Deion Jones. He played in 16 games with 13 starts, finishing with a team-leading 94 combined tackles, and 1.5 sacks.

==== 2019 ====
In Week 4 against the Tennessee Titans, Campbell recorded a team-high 17 tackles in the 24–10 loss. In Week 11 against the Panthers, Campbell recorded a team-high 11 tackles and intercepted a pass thrown by Kyle Allen in the 29–3 win. In Week 15 against the San Francisco 49ers, Campbell forced a fumble on running back Matt Breida which he recovered in the 29–22 win.

=== Arizona Cardinals ===
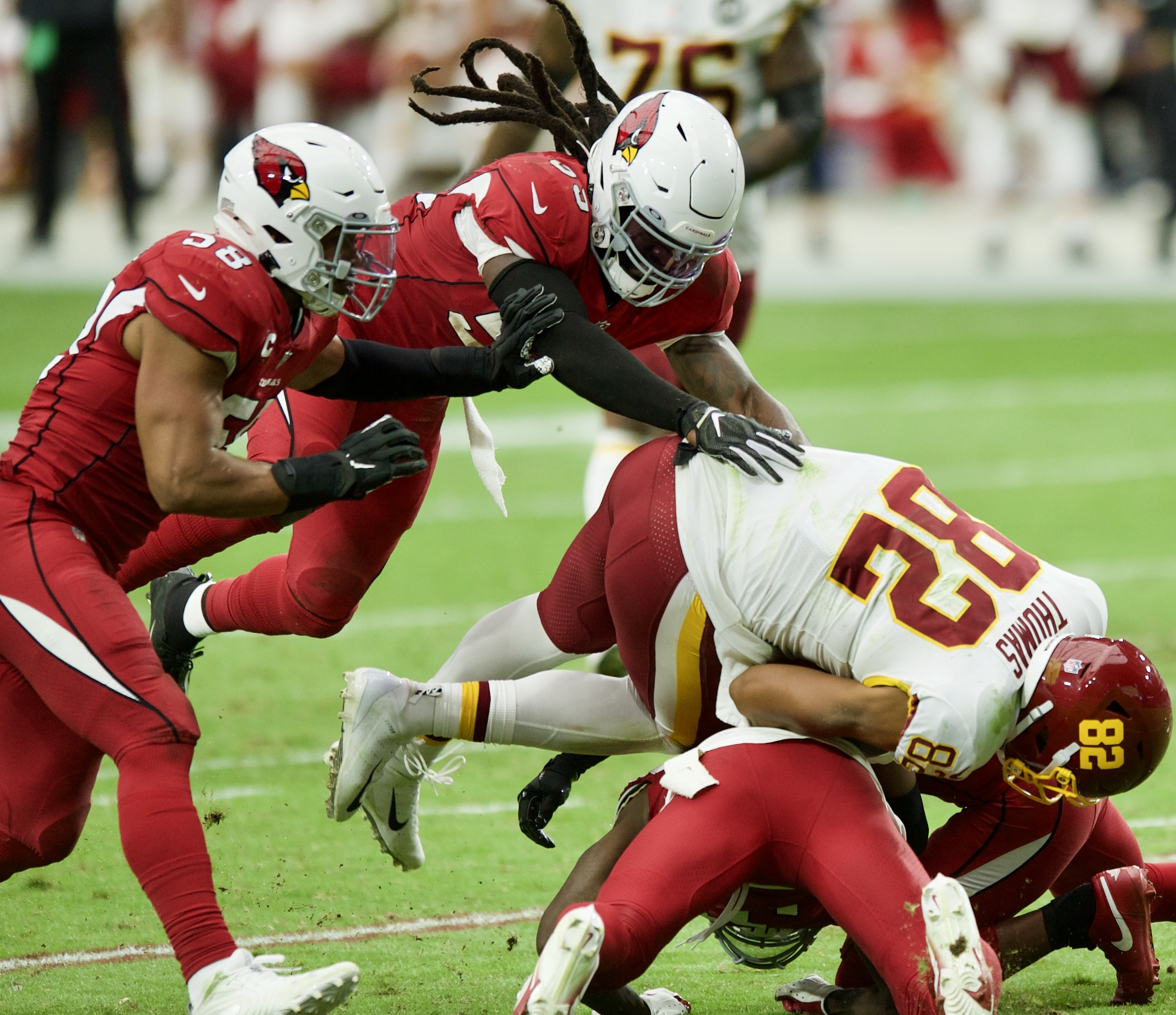
Campbell (center) in 2020

On April 3, 2020, Campbell signed a one–year contract with the Cardinals.

In Week 9 against the Miami Dolphins, Campbell recorded his first sack as a Cardinal on Tua Tagovailoa during the 34–31 loss. He finished the season starting all 16 games, recording 99 tackles (third on the team) and 2.0 sacks.

=== Green Bay Packers ===
==== 2021 ====
On June 9, 2021, Campbell signed with the Packers. He was named the starting inside linebacker alongside Krys Barnes.

In a 35–17 win over the Detroit Lions in Week 2, Campbell notched an interception thrown by Lions quarterback Jared Goff. He caught his second interception on the season in a 25–22 overtime victory over the Cincinnati Bengals when he caught an errant pass thrown by Bengals quarterback Joe Burrow in the first play of overtime.

Campbell won the NFC Defensive Player of the Month award for his performances during the month of October. In five games during that month (all of them wins), Campbell recorded 45 total tackles (three for loss), one sack, one interception, two forced fumbles, two pressures, and two pass deflections; he had a season-high 14 tackles on October 24 during a Week 7 victory over the Washington Football Team.

On January 14, 2022, Campbell was named a first-team member of the 2021 All-Pro Team, becoming the first Packers inside linebacker to achieve this honor since Ray Nitschke in 1966. He finished the season as PFF's second-highest graded linebacker, behind Micah Parsons of the Dallas Cowboys.

==== 2022 ====
On March 17, 2022, Campbell re-signed with the Packers on a five-year deal, worth $50 million. On October 23, 2022, during a Week 7 loss to the Washington Commanders, Campbell intercepted a pass from Taylor Heinicke and returned it 63 yards for his first NFL touchdown.

Campbell was released on March 13, 2024.

=== San Francisco 49ers ===
On March 18, 2024, Campbell signed a one-year contract with the San Francisco 49ers.

Campbell started 12 of the 49ers' first 13 games, filling in for injured linebacker Dre Greenlaw. With the return of Greenlaw in the 49ers' Week 15 matchup against the Los Angeles Rams, Campbell was relegated to a reserve role and did not play in the first half. With Greenlaw and Dee Winters experiencing injuries, the team asked Campbell to enter the game, but he refused and later left for the locker room in the second half as the 49ers lost 12–6. Campbell was criticized heavily by teammates, coaches, and the media. Head coach Kyle Shanahan remarked, "[refusing to play] is not something you can do to your team... and still be a part [of it]." On December 16, 2024, Campbell was suspended for the rest of the season by the 49ers.

== NFL career statistics ==
Legend
**Bold**	Career high

=== Regular season ===
Year	Team	Games		Tackles					Interceptions						Fumbles				
Year	Team	GP	GS	Cmb	Solo	Ast	Sck	TFL	Int	Yds	Avg	Lng	TD	PD	FF	Fum	FR	Yds	TD
2016	ATL	11	10	48	35	13	0.0	5	1	7	7.0	7	0	**7**	1	0	0	0	0
2017	ATL	**16**	**16**	92	61	31	**2.0**	3	0	0	0.0	0	0	4	1	0	0	0	0
2018	ATL	**16**	13	94	63	31	1.5	4	0	0	0.0	0	0	0	0	0	0	0	0
2019	ATL	**16**	15	129	75	**54**	**2.0**	6	**2**	−5	−2.5	0	0	5	**3**	0	**1**	0	0
2020	ARI	**16**	**16**	99	69	30	**2.0**	**7**	0	0	0.0	0	0	3	1	0	0	0	0
2021	GB	**16**	**16**	**146**	**102**	44	**2.0**	6	**2**	15	7.5	13	0	5	2	0	**1**	**3**	0
2022	GB	13	13	96	56	40	0.0	6	**2**	**77**	**38.5**	**63**	**1**	3	0	0	0	0	0
2023	GB	11	11	75	46	29	0.0	3	0	0	0.0	0	0	1	0	0	**1**	**3**	0
2024	SF	13	12	79	44	35	0.0	3	0	0	0.0	0	0	2	0	0	0	0	0
Career		128	122	858	551	307	9.5	43	7	94	13.4	63	1	30	8	0	3	6	0

=== Postseason ===
Year	Team	Games		Tackles					Interceptions						Fumbles				
Year	Team	GP	GS	Cmb	Solo	Ast	Sck	TFL	Int	Yds	Avg	Lng	TD	PD	FF	Fum	FR	Yds	TD
2016	ATL	**3**	**3**	11	8	3	0.0	0	0	0	0.0	0	0	0	0	0	0	0	0
2017	ATL	2	2	8	8	0	**1.0**	**2**	0	0	0.0	0	0	0	0	0	0	0	0
2021	GB	1	1	7	6	1	0.0	0	0	0	0.0	0	0	1	0	0	0	0	0
2023	GB	2	1	**16**	**11**	**5**	**1.0**	0	0	0	0.0	0	0	**2**	0	0	0	0	0
Career		8	7	42	33	9	2.0	2	0	0	0.0	0	0	3	0	0	0	0	0
