= Deion Jones =

American football player (born 1994)

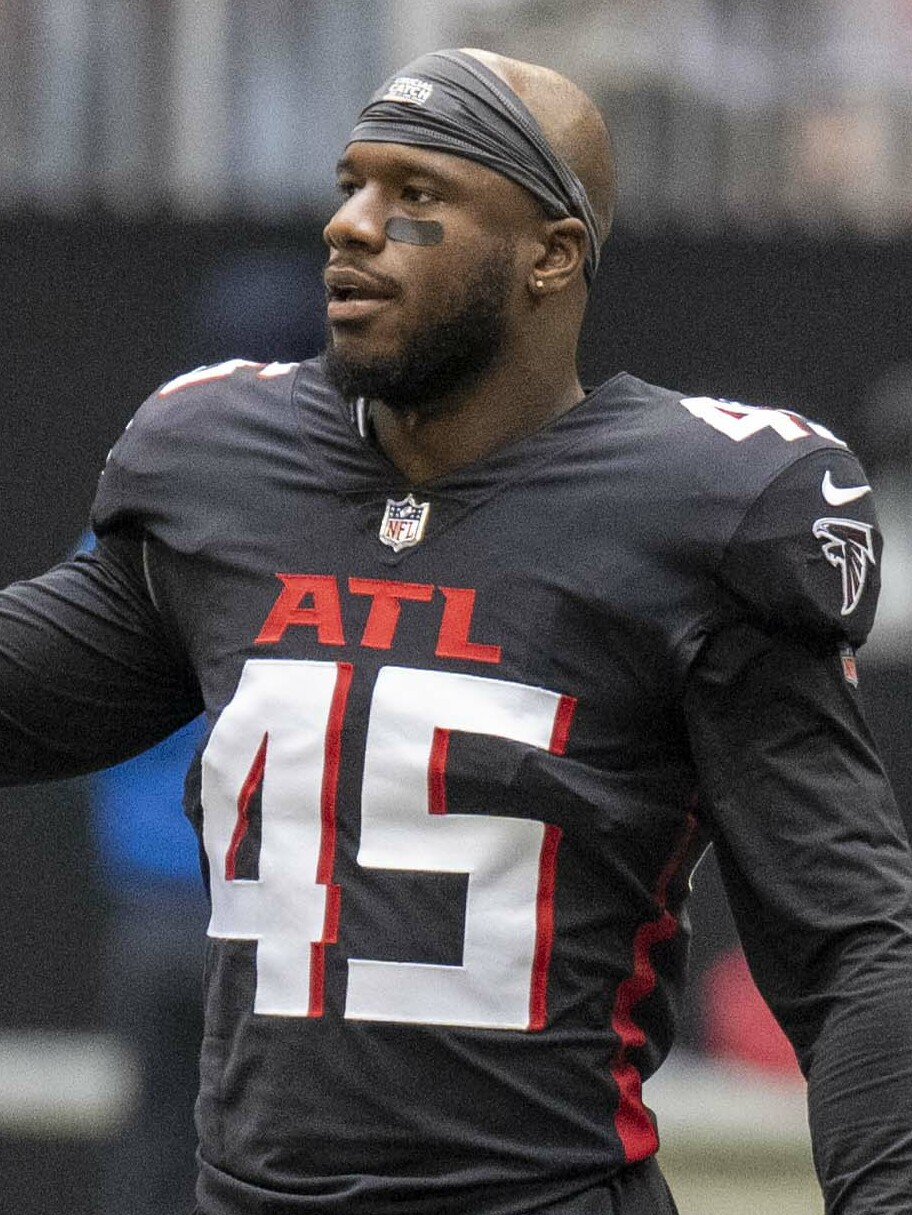
- Jones with the Atlanta Falcons in 2021

Profile
- Position: Linebacker

Personal information
- Born: November 4, 1994 (age 32); New Orleans, Louisiana, U.S.
- Listed height: 6 ft 1 in (1.85 m)
- Listed weight: 222 lb (101 kg)

Career information
- High school: Jesuit (New Orleans)
- College: LSU (2012–2015)
- NFL draft: 2016: 2nd round, 52nd overall pick

Career history
- Atlanta Falcons (2016–2022); Cleveland Browns (2022); Carolina Panthers (2023); Buffalo Bills (2024)*; Tampa Bay Buccaneers (2024–2025); New Orleans Saints (2026)*; San Francisco 49ers (2026)*
- * Offseason or practice squad member only

Awards and highlights
- Pro Bowl (2017); PFWA All-Rookie Team (2016)

Career NFL statistics as of 2025
- Total tackles: 761
- Sacks: 12.0
- Forced fumbles: 5
- Fumble recoveries: 2
- Pass deflections: 53
- Interceptions: 13
- Defensive touchdowns: 5
- Stats at Pro Football Reference

Deion Jones (born November 4, 1994) is an American professional football linebacker. He played college football for the LSU Tigers and was selected by Atlanta Falcons in the second round of the 2016 NFL draft.

== Early life ==
Jones attended Jesuit High School in New Orleans, Louisiana, where he was a three-year starter at middle linebacker. As a senior, he had 179 tackles, eight sacks, and three interceptions, helping Jesuit to the LHSAA Class 5A quarterfinals, where the Blue Jays lost to Carencro.

Regarded as a three-star recruit by Rivals.com, Jones was ranked as the No. 31 outside linebacker prospect in the class of 2012. Recruited by Corey Raymond, Jones originally committed to Nebraska in August 2011, but changed his commitment to Louisiana State after receiving a late offer in December 2011.

== College career ==
Under head coach Les Miles, Jones was a backup his first three years at LSU, appearing in 39 games with one start. As a freshman in 2012, he recorded 23 total tackles (three tackles-for-loss). As a sophomore in 2013, he recorded 15 total tackles (one tackle-for-loss). As a junior in 2014, he recorded 26 total tackles (3.5 tackles-for-loss), one pass defended, and one fumble recovery. As a senior in 2015, he became a starter for the first time. In his final collegiate season, he recorded 100 total tackles (13.5 tackles-for-loss), five sacks, two interceptions, one pick-six, three passes defended, and one forced fumble. He was a finalist for the Butkus Award.

== Professional career ==
=== Pre-draft ===
On December 8, 2015, it was announced that Jones had accepted his invitation to play in the 2016 Senior Bowl. On January 30, 2016, Jones played in the Reese's Senior Bowl and recorded six combined tackles as part of Jacksonville Jaguars' head coach Gus Bradley's South team that defeated the North 27–16. He was limited to 26 snaps, but was able to perform well enough throughout the week to impress scouts and coaches. Jones was one of 34 collegiate linebackers to attend the NFL Scouting Combine in Indianapolis, Indiana, and completed most of the drills, but opted to skip the three-cone drill, short shuttle, and bench press. Jones finished fourth among all participating linebackers in the 40-yard dash, eighth in the vertical jump, and finished tenth in the broad jump.

On March 14, 2016, Jones attended LSU's pro day and chose to perform positional drills and all of the combine drills, but opted to stand on his broad jump performance. All together, he performed the 40-yard dash (4.38s), 20-yard dash (2.52s), 10-yard dash (1.52s), bench press (18 reps), vertical jump (35 1/2"), short shuttle (4.26s), and three-cone drill (7.13s). He had an excellent overall performance in the combine drills and positional drills and his 40-yard dash (4.38s) would have finished first among all linebackers at the NFL combine. His time in the 40 was adjusted to an official time of 4.40s and dramatically increased his draft stock and profile. His pro day performance was described as "off the charts" by NFL analyst Gil Brandt. He attended private workouts and visits with multiple teams, including the New Orleans Saints, Indianapolis Colts, Philadelphia Eagles, New York Jets, and San Francisco 49ers. At the conclusion of the pre-draft process, Jones was projected to be a second or third round pick by NFL draft experts and scouts. He was able to raise his draft stock with his performances throughout the draft process and went from a projected third or fourth round pick to an all but guaranteed second rounder. He was ranked the sixth best outside linebacker prospect in the draft by NFLDraftScout.com, was ranked the sixth best linebacker in the draft by NFL analyst Mike Mayock, and was ranked the ninth best linebacker by Sports Illustrated.

Pre-draft measurables
Height	Weight	Arm length	Hand span	Wingspan	40-yard dash	10-yard split	20-yard split	20-yard shuttle	Three-cone drill	Vertical jump	Broad jump	Bench press
6 ft 0 7/8 in (1.85 m)	222 lb (101 kg)	32 3/8 in (0.82 m)	9 1/4 in (0.23 m)	6 ft 5 1/4 in (1.96 m)	4.38 s	1.52 s	2.52 s	4.26 s	7.13 s	35.5 in (0.90 m)	10 ft 0 in (3.05 m)	18 reps
All values from NFL Combine/LSU's Pro Day

=== Atlanta Falcons ===
==== 2016 season ====
The Atlanta Falcons selected Jones in the second round with the 52nd overall pick in the 2016 NFL draft. He was the eighth linebacker selected in 2016 and was the first of two linebackers the Falcons selected in 2016, along with fourth round pick (115th overall) De'Vondre Campbell. Jones was also reunited with LSU teammate Jalen Collins. The Falcons decided to draft Jones after linebackers coach Jeff Ulbrich scouted him at the combine. Ulbrich and head coach Dan Quinn thought Jones was an ideal candidate to play middle linebacker with his speed and pass coverage ability.

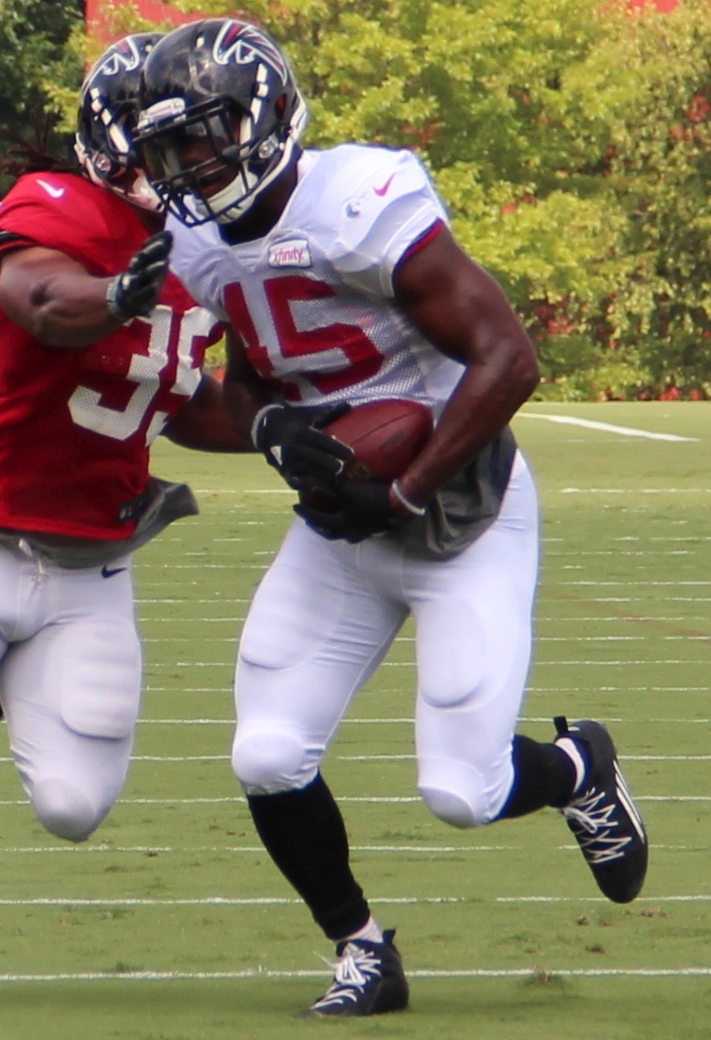
Jones in 2016

On May 5, 2016, the Falcons signed Jones to a four-year, $4.54 million contract that includes $2.16 million guaranteed and a signing bonus of $1.50 million.

Throughout training camp, Jones competed against veteran Paul Worrilow for the job as the starting middle linebacker. Jones credits Worrilow for guiding him through the beginning of his career and stated Worrilow acted as a mentor even though Jones was drafted with the intent of eventually replacing him. Quinn named Jones the starting middle linebacker to start the regular season.

Jones made his NFL debut and first NFL start in the season-opener against the Tampa Bay Buccaneers and recorded six combined tackles in a 31–24 loss. On September 26, 2016, Jones collected nine combined tackles, broke up two passes, and returned his first NFL interception for a 90-yard touchdown during a 45–32 road victory against the Saints. His interception came in the fourth quarter off a pass attempt by Drew Brees and marked his first NFL touchdown. Jones was inactive for the Falcons' Week 5 victory at the Denver Broncos, after sustaining an ankle injury the previous week. During Week 14, he made five combined tackles, deflected two passes, and returned an interception by Jared Goff for a 33-yard touchdown during a 42–14 road victory against the Los Angeles Rams. Two weeks later, Jones recorded a season-high 13 combined tackles and broke up a pass during a 33–16 road victory against the Carolina Panthers.

Jones finished his rookie year with 108 combined tackles (75 solo), 11 pass deflections, three interceptions, and two touchdowns in 15 games and 13 starts. He was named to the PFWA All-Rookie Team.

The Falcons finished atop in the NFC South with an 11–5 record and received a first-round bye in the playoffs. On January 14, 2017, Jones started his first NFL playoff game and made five combined tackles, broke up a pass, and intercepted Russell Wilson as they defeated the Seattle Seahawks in the NFC Divisional Round. After defeating the Green Bay Packers in the NFC Championship, the Falcons went on to face the New England Patriots in Super Bowl LI. On February 5, 2017, Jones recorded nine combined tackles and one forced fumble off of running back LeGarrette Blount during the Falcons' 28–34 overtime loss.

==== 2017 season ====
Jones entered training camp slated as the starting middle linebacker after Paul Worrilow departed for the Detroit Lions in free agency.

During Week 4 against the Buffalo Bills, Jones recorded eight combined tackles and made his first NFL sack on Tyrod Taylor during a 23–17 loss. In Week 14, Jones recorded a season-high 13 combined tackles, broke up two passes, and intercepted Drew Brees in the end zone with less than 90 seconds left, sealing a 20–17 victory over the Saints on Thursday Night Football. His performance earned him NFC Defensive Player of the Week. On December 24, 2017, Jones recorded ten combined tackles, defended one pass, and intercepted one pass by Drew Brees in a 23–13 road loss against the Saints.

Jones led the team with 138 combined tackles (91 solo) in 2017 and also recorded ten pass deflections, three interceptions, and a sack in 16 games and starts. The Falcons finished third in the NFC South with a 10–6 record and received a wild card playoff berth. On January 6, 2018, Jones recorded ten combined tackles and defended a pass in a 26–13 road victory against the Los Angeles Rams in the NFC Wild Card Round. They were eliminated from the playoffs the following week after losing 15–10 to the eventual Super Bowl LII Champions the Eagles in the Divisional Round. On January 16, 2018, Jones was named to his first Pro Bowl as a replacement for injured Panthers linebacker Luke Kuechly.

==== 2018 season ====
During the season opener against the Eagles, Jones recorded his first interception of the season off a pass thrown by Nick Foles. On September 11, 2018, Jones was placed on injured reserve with a foot injury. He was activated off injured reserve on November 13, 2018. In Week 15, in a 40–14 victory against the Arizona Cardinals, Jones recorded his second interception of the season, a 41-yard pick-six off a pass thrown by Josh Rosen.

Jones finished the 2018 season with 53 combined tackles, one sack, one forced fumble, and two interceptions in six games and starts.

==== 2019 season ====
On July 17, 2019, Jones signed a four-year, $57 million contract extension with the Falcons with $34 million guaranteed.

In the regular season-finale against the Tampa Bay Buccaneers, Jones recorded his first and only interception of the season off a pass thrown by Jameis Winston and returned it for a 27-yard touchdown on the first play of overtime to secure a 28–22 road victory. Jones was named NFC Defensive Player of the Week for his performance. With the interception return, he broke the Falcons franchise record for most interceptions returned for a touchdown, previously held by Deion Sanders and Kevin Mathis. He finished the 2019 season with 110 total tackles, one interception, and five passes defended.

==== 2020 season ====
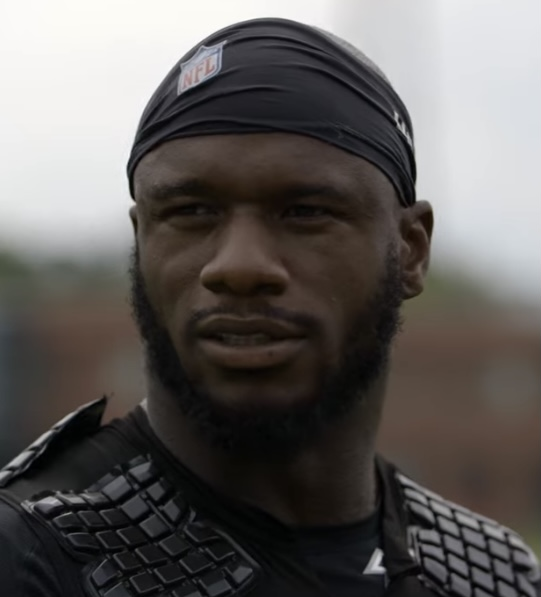
Jones in 2021

In Week 6 against the Minnesota Vikings, Jones recorded his first interception of the season off a pass thrown by Kirk Cousins during the 40–23 win. In Week 7 against the Detroit Lions, Jones recorded his first full sack of the season on Matthew Stafford during the 23–22 loss. In Week 12 against the Las Vegas Raiders, Jones intercepted a pass thrown by Derek Carr and returned it 67 yards for his sixth career touchdown during the 43–6 win. In Week 15 against the Tampa Bay Buccaneers, Jones led the team with 10 tackles and sacked Tom Brady once during the 31–27 loss. In the 2020 season, Jones had 4.5 sacks, 106 total tackles, two interceptions, six passes defended, and one forced fumble.

==== 2021 season ====
In Week 7, Jones registered 15 tackles, three tackles for loss, and a sack in a 30–28 win over the Miami Dolphins, earning NFC Defensive Player of the Week. In the 2021 season, Jones had two sacks, 137 total tackles, six passes defended, and one forced fumble.

==== 2022 season ====
On September 1, 2022, Jones was placed on injured reserve.

=== Cleveland Browns ===
On October 10, 2022, the Falcons traded Jones and a 2024 seventh-round pick to the Cleveland Browns for a 2024 sixth-round pick. Following the deal, the Browns and Jones agreed to remove a year from his contract. He was activated off injured reserve on October 22. He finished the 2022 season with 2.5 sacks, 44 total tackles, one interception, three passes defended, and one forced fumble in 11 games and five starts.

=== Carolina Panthers ===
On July 31, 2023, Jones signed with the Panthers. He was released on August 29, 2023, then re-signed to the practice squad on September 11. He was promoted to the active roster on September 20.

=== Buffalo Bills ===
On May 3, 2024, Jones signed a one-year contract with the Buffalo Bills. He was released on August 25.

=== Tampa Bay Buccaneers ===
On December 10, 2024, Jones was signed to the Tampa Bay Buccaneers practice squad. He signed a reserve/future contract with the Buccaneers on January 14, 2025.

=== New Orleans Saints ===
On August 8, 2026, Jones signed with the New Orleans Saints.

=== San Francisco 49ers ===
On August 24, 2026, Jones was traded to San Francisco 49ers in exchange for Zamir White. On August 30, he was released by San Francisco as a part of final roster cuts.

== NFL career statistics ==
Legend
	Led the league
**Bold**	Career high

=== Regular season ===
Year	Team	Games		Tackles				Interceptions						Fumbles			
Year	Team	GP	GS	Cmb	Solo	Ast	Sck	PD	Int	Yds	Avg	Lng	TD	FF	FR	Yds	TD
2016	ATL	15	13	108	75	33	0.0	**11**	**3**	**165**	**55.0**	**90T**	**2**	**1**	0	0	0
2017	ATL	16	16	**138**	**91**	47	1.0	10	**3**	42	14.0	41	0	0	0	0	0
2018	ATL	6	6	53	34	19	1.0	6	2	61	30.5	41	1	**1**	0	0	0
2019	ATL	16	16	110	68	42	0.0	5	1	27	27.0	27T	1	0	**1**	**5**	0
2020	ATL	16	16	106	73	33	**4.5**	6	2	84	42.0	67T	1	**1**	**1**	0	0
2021	ATL	16	16	137	87	**50**	2.0	6	0	0	0.0	0	0	**1**	0	0	0
2022	CLE	11	5	44	25	19	2.5	3	1	5	5.0	5	0	**1**	0	0	0
2023	CAR	13	3	35	22	13	1.0	6	1	0	0.0	0	0	0	0	0	0
2024	TB	2	0	1	1	0	0.0	0	0	0	0.0	0	0	0	0	0	0
2025	TB	17	0	29	16	13	0.0	0	0	0	0.0	0	0	0	0	0	0
Career		128	91	761	492	269	12.0	53	13	384	29.5	90T	5	5	2	5	0

=== Postseason ===
Year	Team	Games		Tackles				Interceptions						Fumbles			
Year	Team	GP	GS	Cmb	Solo	Ast	Sck	PD	Int	Yds	Avg	Lng	TD	FF	FR	Yds	TD
2016	ATL	3	3	**20**	**15**	**5**	0.0	**3**	**1**	**28**	**28.0**	**28**	0	**1**	0	0	0
2017	ATL	2	2	13	9	4	0.0	1	0	0	0.0	0	0	0	0	0	0
2024	TB	1	0	2	1	1	0.0	1	0	0	0.0	0	0	0	0	0	0
Career		6	5	35	25	10	0.0	5	1	28	28.0	28	0	1	0	0	0

== Personal life ==
Jones' father named him after Hall of Fame cornerback Deion Sanders. He began being known as "War Daddy" during his stint at LSU. Jones' nickname "Debo" was given to him by his father and is a portmanteau of Deion Sanders and Bo Jackson.
