= Joshua Perkins =

American football player (born 1993)

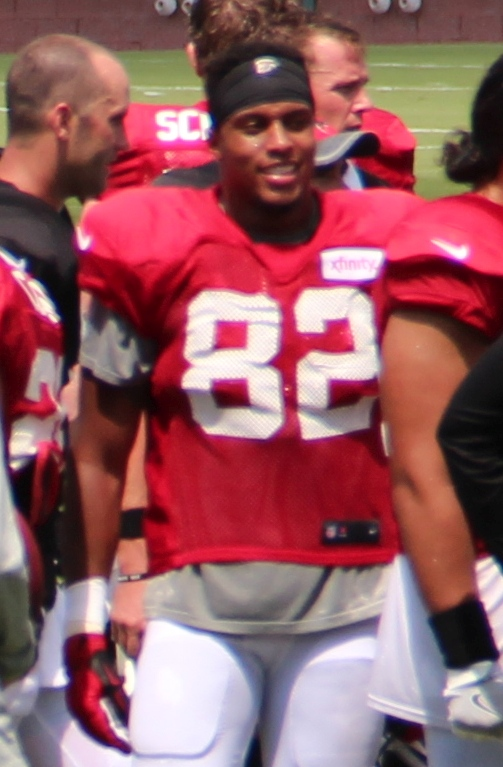
- Perkins with the Atlanta Falcons in 2016

Profile
- Position: Tight end

Personal information
- Born: August 5, 1993 (age 33); Cerritos, California, U.S.
- Listed height: 6 ft 4 in (1.93 m)
- Listed weight: 227 lb (103 kg)

Career information
- High school: Gahr (Cerritos, California)
- College: Washington (2011–2015)
- NFL draft: 2016: undrafted

Career history
- Atlanta Falcons (2016–2017); Philadelphia Eagles (2018–2020); San Francisco 49ers (2021)*; New York Jets (2021)*; Seattle Sea Dragons (2023)
- * Offseason or practice squad member only

Career NFL statistics
- Receptions: 17
- Receiving yards: 196
- Receiving touchdowns: 2
- Stats at Pro Football Reference

Joshua Perkins (born August 5, 1993) is an American professional football tight end. He played college football at Washington and was signed by the Atlanta Falcons as an undrafted free agent in 2016.

== Professional career ==
Pre-draft measurables
Height	Weight	40-yard dash	10-yard split	20-yard split	20-yard shuttle	Three-cone drill	Vertical jump	Broad jump	Bench press
6 ft 3 in (1.91 m)	223 lb (101 kg)	4.65 s	1.66 s	2.70 s	4.38 s	7.04 s	34 in (0.86 m)	10 ft 6 in (3.20 m)	12 reps
All values are from Pro Day

=== Atlanta Falcons ===
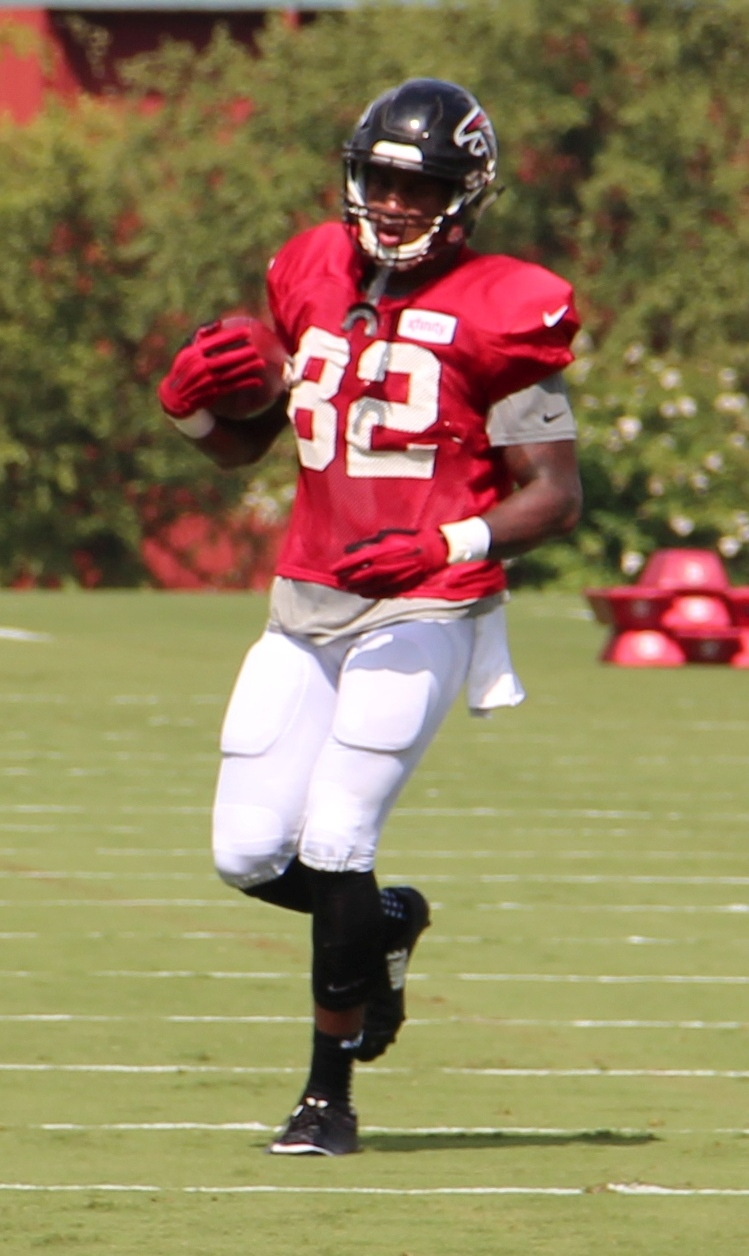
Perkins with the Falcons in 2016

After going undrafted in the 2016 NFL draft, Perkins signed with the Atlanta Falcons on May 5, 2016. He made his first start in Week 16 against their NFC South rival Carolina Panthers and caught his first career touchdown on a 26-yard pass from Matt Ryan.

Perkins and the Falcons reached Super Bowl LI, where they faced the New England Patriots. In the Super Bowl, the Falcons fell in a 34–28 overtime defeat.

On September 2, 2017, Perkins was waived by the Falcons and was signed to their practice squad the next day. He was placed on the practice squad/injured list on October 11. Perkins was released by the Falcons on January 10, 2018.

=== Philadelphia Eagles ===
On January 15, 2018, Perkins signed a reserve/future contract with the Philadelphia Eagles. He played in nine games for the team before being placed on injured reserve on November 16.

Perkins was waived during final roster cuts on August 31, 2019, but was re-signed to the team's practice squad the next day. He was promoted to the team's active roster on November 30. On December 9, Perkins had five catches for 37 yards against the New York Giants, including a 13-yard catch in overtime. In Week 17, Perkins caught his first touchdown since 2016 after catching a 24-yard pass from quarterback Carson Wentz; the touchdown pass helped the Eagles win 34–17 over the Giants and capture the NFC East title while Perkins finished the game with four receptions for a touchdown and 50 yards.

On August 26, 2020, Perkins was placed on injured reserve.

=== San Francisco 49ers ===
On August 4, 2021, Perkins signed a one-year contract with the San Francisco 49ers. Perkins was released by San Francisco on August 17.

=== New York Jets ===
On December 29, 2021, Perkins was signed to the New York Jets' practice squad.

=== Seattle Sea Dragons ===
On November 17, 2022, Perkins was drafted by the Seattle Sea Dragons of the XFL. Perkins never played a snap for the Sea Dragons and was removed from the roster on May 2, 2023.
