= Fred Booker =

Fred Booker may refer to:

- Fred Booker (singer-songwriter) (1939–2008), Canadian author and singer-songwriter
- Fred Booker (cyclist) (1944–2006), English cyclist
- Fred Booker (gridiron football) (born 1978), American professional football defensive back
