= Ricardo Allen =

American football player (born 1991)

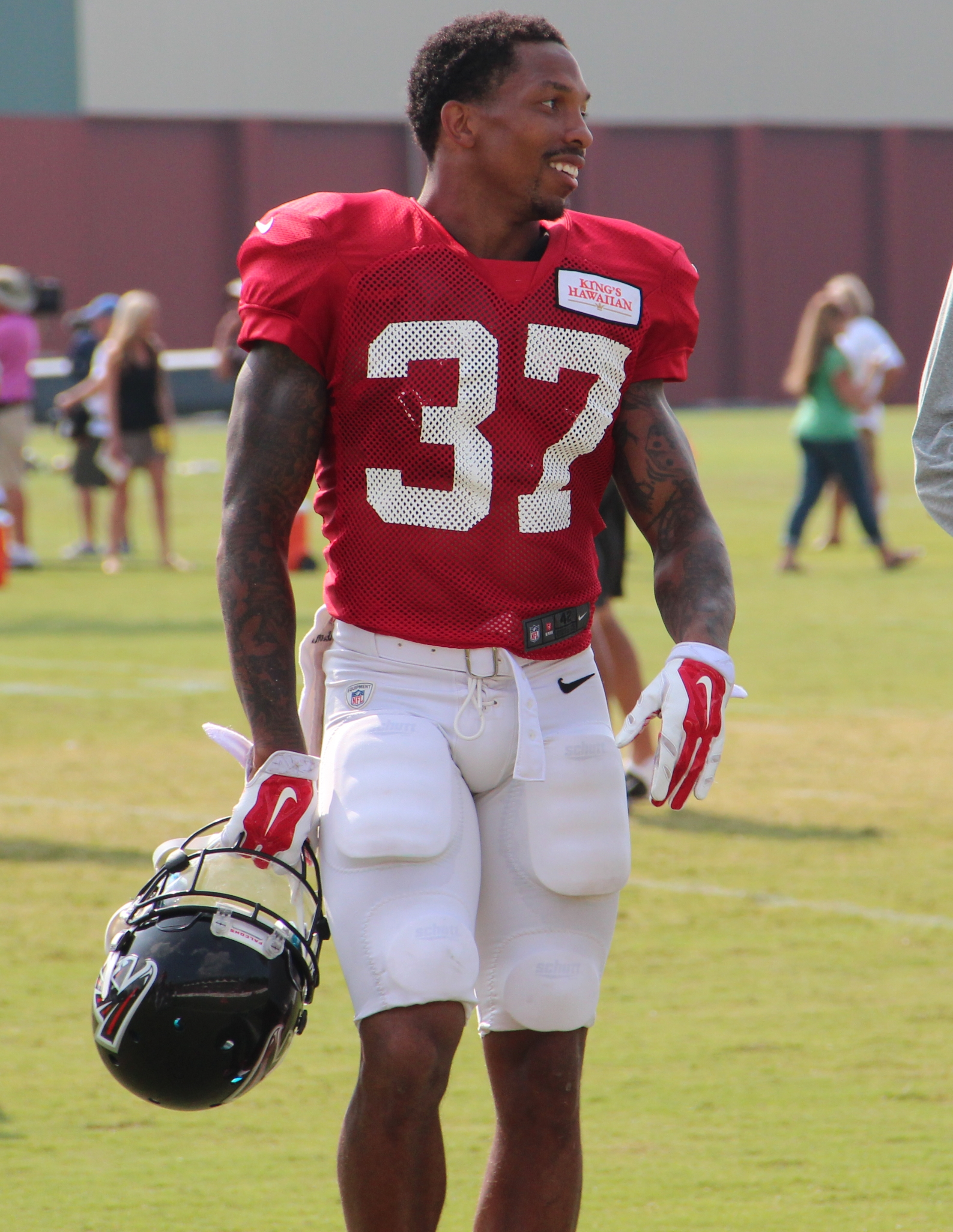
- Allen with the Atlanta Falcons in 2014

No. 37
- Position: Safety

Personal information
- Born: December 18, 1991 (age 34); Daytona Beach, Florida, U.S.
- Listed height: 5 ft 9 in (1.75 m)
- Listed weight: 186 lb (84 kg)

Career information
- High school: Mainland (Daytona Beach)
- College: Purdue (2010–2013)
- NFL draft: 2014: 5th round, 147th overall pick

Career history

Playing
- Atlanta Falcons (2014–2020); Cincinnati Bengals (2021)

Coaching
- Miami Dolphins (2022) Special teams assistant; Miami Dolphins (2023) Offensive assistant

Awards and highlights
- 4× Second-team All-Big Ten (2010–2013)

Career NFL statistics
- Total tackles: 355
- Sacks: 1
- Pass deflections: 26
- Interceptions: 11
- Fumble recoveries: 1
- Stats at Pro Football Reference

Ricardo Jamal Allen (born December 18, 1991) is an American former professional football player who was a safety in the National Football League (NFL). He played college football for the Purdue Boilermakers and was selected in the fifth round of the 2014 NFL draft by the Atlanta Falcons, with whom he played seven seasons before playing his final season with the Cincinnati Bengals. After his playing career, he coached two seasons with the Miami Dolphins and was released after the 2023 season.

== Early life ==
Allen attended Mainland High School in Daytona Beach, Florida. Allen committed to Purdue University on October 16, 2009.

College recruiting
Name	Hometown	School	Height	Weight	40^{‡}	Commit date
Ricardo Allen; CB	Daytona Beach, Florida	Mainland High School	5 ft 9 in (1.75 m)	190 lb (86 kg)	4.35	Oct 16, 2009
Ricardo Allen; CB	Recruit ratings: Scout: Rivals: (76)					
Overall recruit ranking: Scout: 34 (CB) Rivals: 29 (CB), 57 (FL) ESPN: 50 (CB)
Note: In many cases, Scout, Rivals, 247Sports, On3, and ESPN may conflict in their listings of height and weight.; In these cases, the average was taken. ESPN grades are on a 100-point scale.; Sources: "Purdue Football Commitment List (24)". Rivals.; "Purdue College Football Recruiting Commits". Scout.; "ESPN". ESPN.; "Scout.com Team Recruiting Rankings". Scout.; "2010 Team Ranking". Rivals.com.

== College career ==
As a freshman at Purdue in 2010, Allen recorded 73 total tackles, 3.5 tackles-for-loss, one sack, three interceptions, two pick-sixes, and seven passes defended. As a sophomore in 2011, he recorded 79 total tackles, three tackles-for-loss, three interceptions, one pick-six, one forced fumble, and seven passes defended. As a junior in 2012, Allen broke the Purdue record for interceptions for touchdowns. In total, he recorded 45 total tackles, four sacks, one tackle-for-loss, one pick six, and five passes defended. He was a second team All-Big Ten Conference selection. As a senior in 2013, he recorded 53 total tackles, four tackles-for-loss, one sack, six interceptions, three passes defended, and one forced fumble.

=== Statistics ===
Purdue Boilermakers
Season	Tackles						Interceptions				
Season	Solo	Ast	Cmb	TfL	Sck	FF	Int	Yds	Avg	TD	PD
2010	56	17	73	3.5	1.0	0	3	129	43.0	2	7
2011	60	19	79	3.0	0.0	1	3	37	12.3	1	7
2012	42	3	45	4.0	1.0	0	1	39	39.0	1	5
2013	42	11	53	4.0	1.0	1	6	42	7.0	0	3
Career	200	50	250	14.5	3.0	2	13	247	19.0	4	22

== Professional career ==
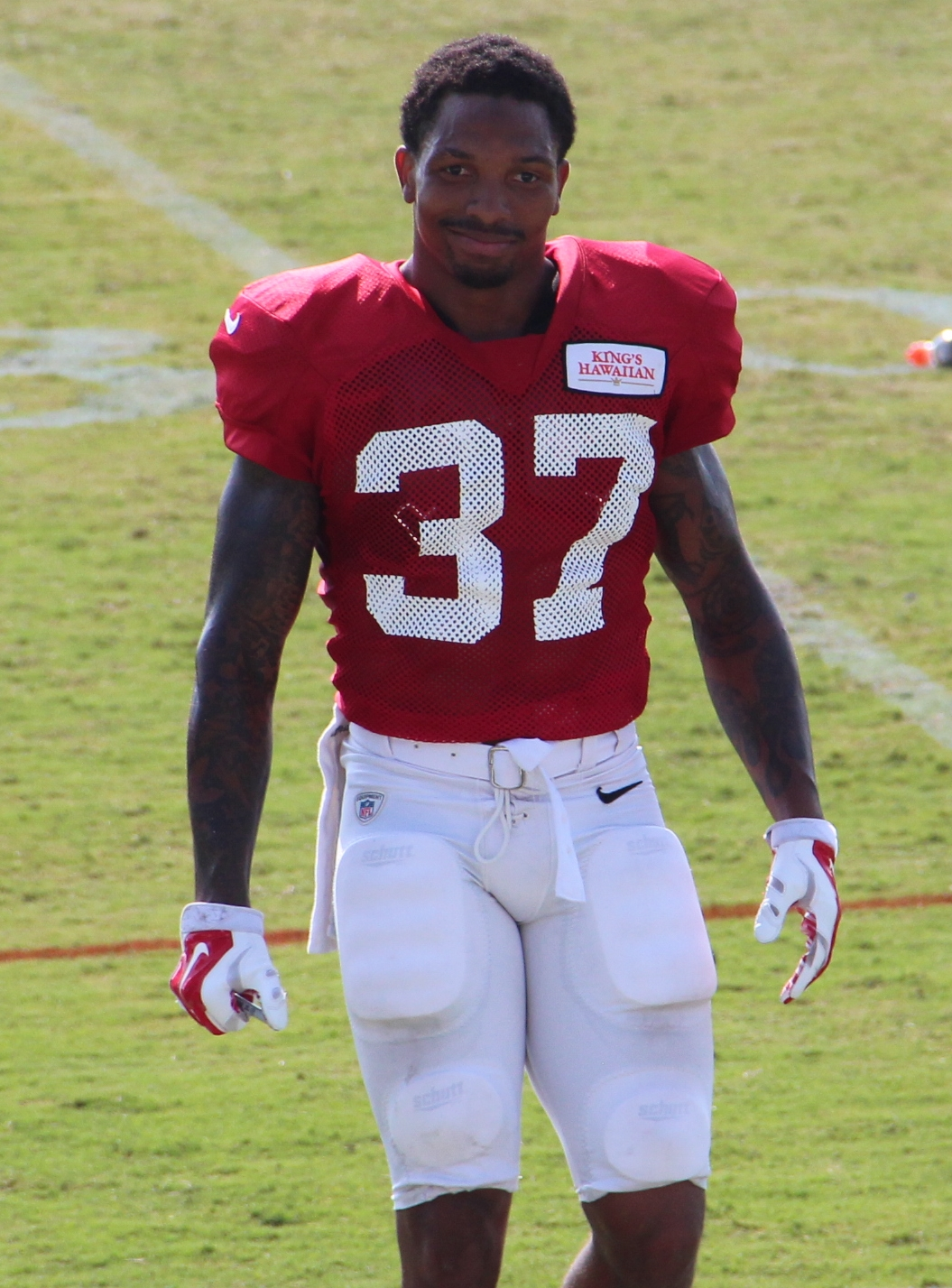
Allen at Falcons training camp in 2014

Pre-draft measurables
Height	Weight	Arm length	Hand span	40-yard dash	10-yard split	20-yard split	20-yard shuttle	Three-cone drill	Vertical jump	Broad jump	Bench press
5 ft 9 1/8 in (1.76 m)	187 lb (85 kg)	30 in (0.76 m)	9 1/4 in (0.23 m)	4.61 s	1.66 s	2.72 s	4.15 s	6.90 s	35.5 in (0.90 m)	9 ft 9 in (2.97 m)	13 reps
All values are from NFL Combine/Purdue's Pro Day

=== Atlanta Falcons ===
==== 2014 ====
The Atlanta Falcons selected Allen in the fifth round (147th overall) of the 2014 NFL draft. Allen was the 18th cornerback selected in 2014.

On May 18, 2014, the Falcons signed Allen to a four-year, $2.42 million contract that includes a signing bonus of $200,500.

Throughout training camp, he competed against Robert McClain, Josh Wilson, and Javier Arenas for the job as the starting nickelback. Throughout the preseason, he saw minimal playing time on defense. On August 28, 2014, Allen recorded four solo tackles and deflected his second pass of the preseason during a 24–14 victory at the Jacksonville Jaguars in the Falcons' fourth preseason game. On August 30, 2014, Allen was released by the Falcons as part of their final roster cuts. On September 2, 2014, the Falcons signed him to the practice squad and retained five cornerbacks on the active roster, including Desmond Trufant, Robert Alford, Wilson, McClain, and Arenas.

On December 16, 2014, the Falcons promoted Allen to the active roster after fellow defensive back Robert Alford was sent to injured reserve. On December 29, 2014, the Falcons fired head coach Mike Smith after they finished third in the NFC South with a 6–10 record in 2014. He was inactive for the Falcons last two regular season games and did not record a stat during his rookie season.

==== 2015 ====
Entering organized team activities, the new Falcons' coaching staff opted to move Allen from cornerback to safety. The change was due to the Falcons failing to secure a new free safety to replace Dwight Lowery and to give Allen a better opportunity to make the active roster. He competed for the job as the starting free safety against Charles Godfrey and Kemal Ishmael. Head coach Dan Quinn named Allen the starting free safety to begin the regular season, alongside strong safety William Moore.

He made his professional regular season debut and first career start in the Falcons' season-opener against the Philadelphia Eagles and recorded a seven combined tackles, deflected a pass, and made his first career interception off a pass by Sam Bradford during their 26–24 win. In Week 3, Allen recorded seven solo tackles before leaving the Falcons' 39–28 victory against the Dallas Cowboys in the third quarter after sustaining a knee injury. He was inactive for their Week 4 victory against the Washington Redskins due to a sprained MCL. On November 1, 2015, Allen recorded six combined tackles and made his first career sack on quarterback Jameis Winston during the Falcons' 23–20 loss against the Tampa Bay Buccaneers. In Week 13, he collected a season-high eight solo tackles during a 23–19 loss at the Buccaneers. He finished the 2015 season with 68 combined tackles (59 solo), four pass deflections, three interceptions, and a sack in 15 games and 14 starts.

==== 2016 ====
On March 7, 2016, the Falcons placed a one-year, $525,000 exclusive rights tender on Allen to secure him for the upcoming season.

Allen entered training camp slated as the starting free safety, but saw minor competition from Robenson Therezie for the role. Defensive coordinator Richard Smith named Allen the starting strong safety to begin the regular season, alongside strong safety Kemal Ishmael.

On October 23, 2016, Allen recorded a season-high eight combined tackles during a 33–30 loss to the San Diego Chargers. In Week 13, he tied his season-high of eight combined tackles in the Falcons' 29–28 loss to the Kansas City Chiefs. The following week, Allen made six combined tackles, broke up a pass, and intercepted a pass by quarterback Jared Goff during a 42–14 victory at the Los Angeles Rams. He finished the season with a career-high 90 combined tackles (61 solo), three pass deflections, and two interceptions in 16 games and 16 starts.

The Falcons finished the 2016 season first in the NFC South with an 11–5 record, clinching a first round bye and home field advantage through the playoffs. On January 14, 2017, Allen started in his first career playoff game and assisted on two tackles, deflected a pass, and returned an interception by Russell Wilson for 45-yards during the Falcons' 36–20 NFC Divisional Round victory against the Seattle Seahawks. The following week, Allen collected five combined tackles, broke up a pass, and intercepted a pass by quarterback Aaron Rodgers in their 44–21 victory against the Green Bay Packers in the NFC Championship. On February 5, 2017, Allen made seven combined tackles in the Falcons' 34–28 overtime loss in Super Bowl LI to the New England Patriots. The Falcons' defense allowed 19 points in the fourth quarter and defensive coordinator Richard Smith was fired after the defense' collapse in the Super Bowl.

==== 2017 ====
On March 7, 2017, the Falcons signed Allen to a one-year, $615,000 contract. Allen entered camp slated as the de facto starting free safety. Defensive coordinator Marquand Manuel officially named him the starter, alongside strong safety Keanu Neal, to begin the regular season.

On September 25, 2017, Allen recorded three combined tackles before leaving the Falcons' 30–26 victory at the Detroit Lions in the third quarter after suffering a concussion. He remained in concussion protocol and was inactive for their Week 4 loss to the Buffalo Bills. On December 3, 2017, Allen recorded a career-high ten combined tackles during a 14–9 loss to the Minnesota Vikings. In Week 17, he assisted on two tackles, deflected a pass, and intercepted a pass by Cam Newton in the Falcons' 22–10 victory against the Carolina Panthers. He finished the 2017 season with 54 combined tackles (28 solo), two pass deflections, and an interception in 15 games and 15 starts.

The Falcons earned a wildcard berth after finishing third in the NFC South with a 10–6 record. They went on to defeat the Rams 26–13 in the NFC Wildcard Game. On February 13, 2018, Allen recorded four solo tackles in the Falcons' 15–10 loss to the eventual Super Bowl LII Champions, the Eagles in the NFC Divisional Round.

==== 2018 ====
On March 12, 2018, the Falcons placed a second-round restricted free agent tender on Allen. The tender was a one-year, $2.91 million deal that kept Allen under contract for the 2018 season. On August 6, 2018, Allen signed a three-year, $19.5 million contract extension with the Falcons, keeping him under contract through the 2021 season. In Week 3 against the New Orleans Saints, Allen suffered a torn Achilles tendon and was ruled out the rest of the season.

==== 2019 ====
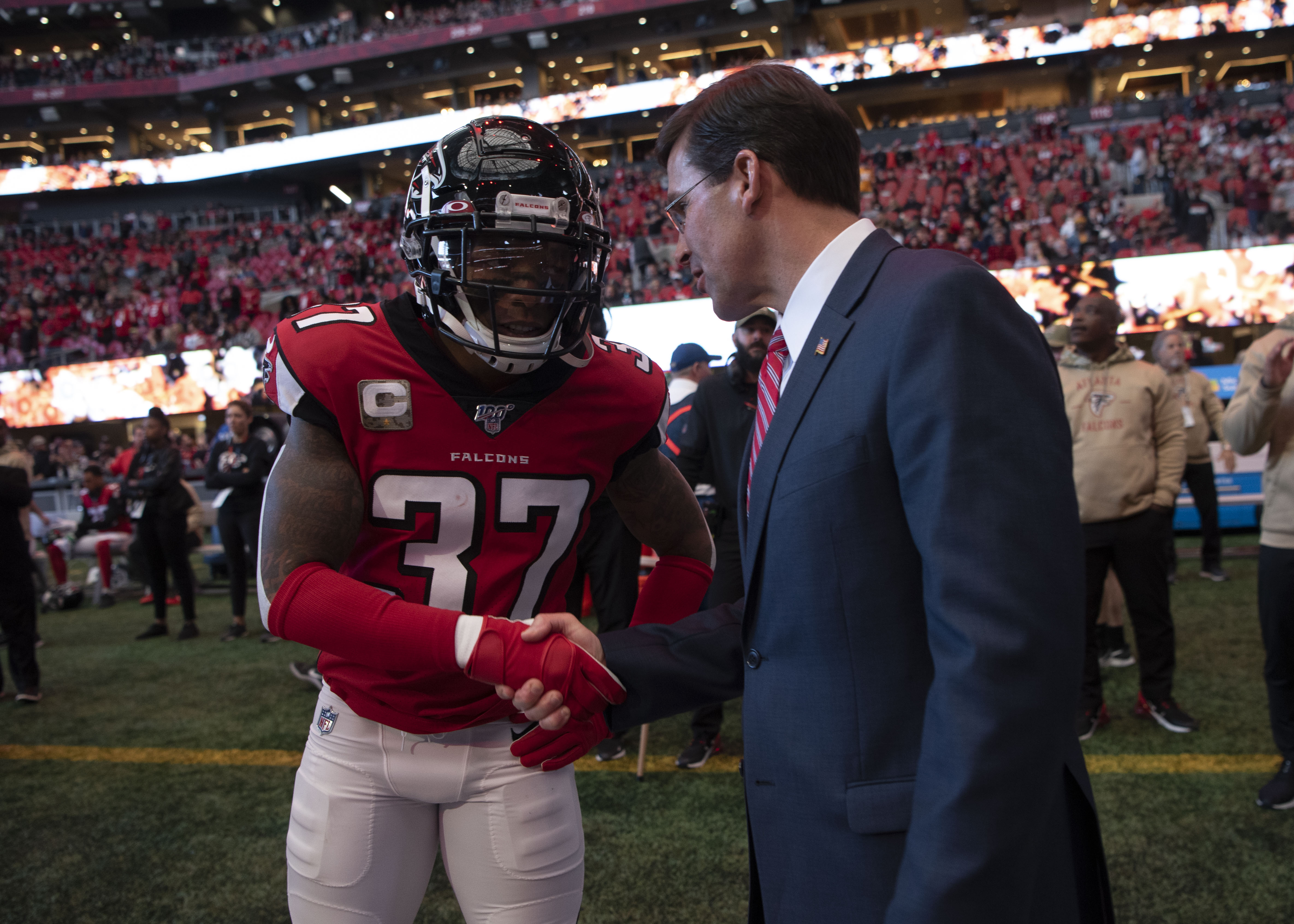
Allen meeting Defense Secretary Mark Esper before a game against the Buccaneers in 2019

In week 11 against the Panthers, Allen recorded his first interception of the season off Kyle Allen in the 29–3 win. In week 17 against the Buccaneers, Allen intercepted a pass thrown by Jameis Winston and returned it for 27 yards during the 28–22 overtime win. He finished the 2019 season with 85 total tackles (54 solo), two interceptions, and eight passes defended.

==== 2020 ====
In Week 9 against the Denver Broncos, Allen recorded his first interception of the season off a pass thrown by Drew Lock during the 34–27 win. In Week 17, in Allen's last game as a Falcon, he recorded a pick off of Buccaneers quarterback Tom Brady in a loss. He finished the 2020 season with 25 total tackles (18 solo), two interceptions, and five passes defended.

The Falcons released Allen on February 18, 2021 after seven seasons.

=== Cincinnati Bengals ===
Allen signed a one-year contract with the Cincinnati Bengals on March 29, 2021. He was named the backup safety to Jessie Bates and Vonn Bell to start the season. He suffered a hand injury in Week 1 and was placed on injured reserve on September 15, 2021. He was activated on October 9. Allen took the majority of his snaps on the Bengals playing special teams. In his lone season with the Bengals, Allen made his second Super Bowl appearance when the Bengals played the Rams in Super Bowl LVI.

A week after playing in the Super Bowl, Allen announced his retirement after eight seasons in the NFL.

== NFL career statistics ==
Legend
**Bold**	Career high

=== Regular season ===
Year	Team	Games		Tackles					Interceptions					Fumbles			
Year	Team	GP	GS	Cmb	Solo	Ast	Sck	TFL	Int	Yds	TD	Lng	PD	FF	FR	Yds	TD
2015	ATL	15	14	69	60	9	**1.0**	0	**3**	13	0	13	5	0	**1**	0	0
2016	ATL	**16**	**16**	**90**	**61**	29	0.0	0	2	3	0	3	3	0	0	0	0
2017	ATL	15	15	54	38	16	0.0	1	1	4	0	4	2	0	0	0	0
2018	ATL	3	3	17	14	3	0.0	0	1	28	0	**28**	3	0	0	0	0
2019	ATL	**16**	**16**	85	54	**31**	0.0	**4**	2	**29**	0	27	**8**	0	0	0	0
2020	ATL	12	12	25	18	7	0.0	1	2	**29**	0	19	5	0	0	0	0
2021	CIN	14	1	15	11	4	0.0	0	0	0	0	0	0	0	0	0	0
Career		91	77	355	256	99	1.0	6	11	106	0	28	26	0	1	0	0

=== Playoffs ===
Year	Team	Games		Tackles					Interceptions					Fumbles			
Year	Team	GP	GS	Cmb	Solo	Ast	Sck	TFL	Int	Yds	TD	Lng	PD	FF	FR	Yds	TD
2016	ATL	3	**3**	**14**	**6**	**8**	0.0	0	**2**	**45**	0	**45**	**2**	0	0	0	0
2017	ATL	2	2	5	5	0	0.0	0	0	0	0	0	0	**1**	0	0	0
2021	CIN	**4**	0	1	1	0	0.0	0	0	0	0	0	0	0	0	0	0
Career		9	5	20	12	8	0.0	0	2	45	0	45	2	1	0	0	0

== Coaching career ==
On March 3, 2022, Allen joined Mike McDaniel's inaugural Miami Dolphins staff as a special teams assistant.

On March 10, 2023, it was announced that Allen would be an offensive assistant for the Dolphins. After the 2023 season, the Dolphins chose not to renew Allen's contract.
