= Desmond Trufant =

American football player (born 1990)

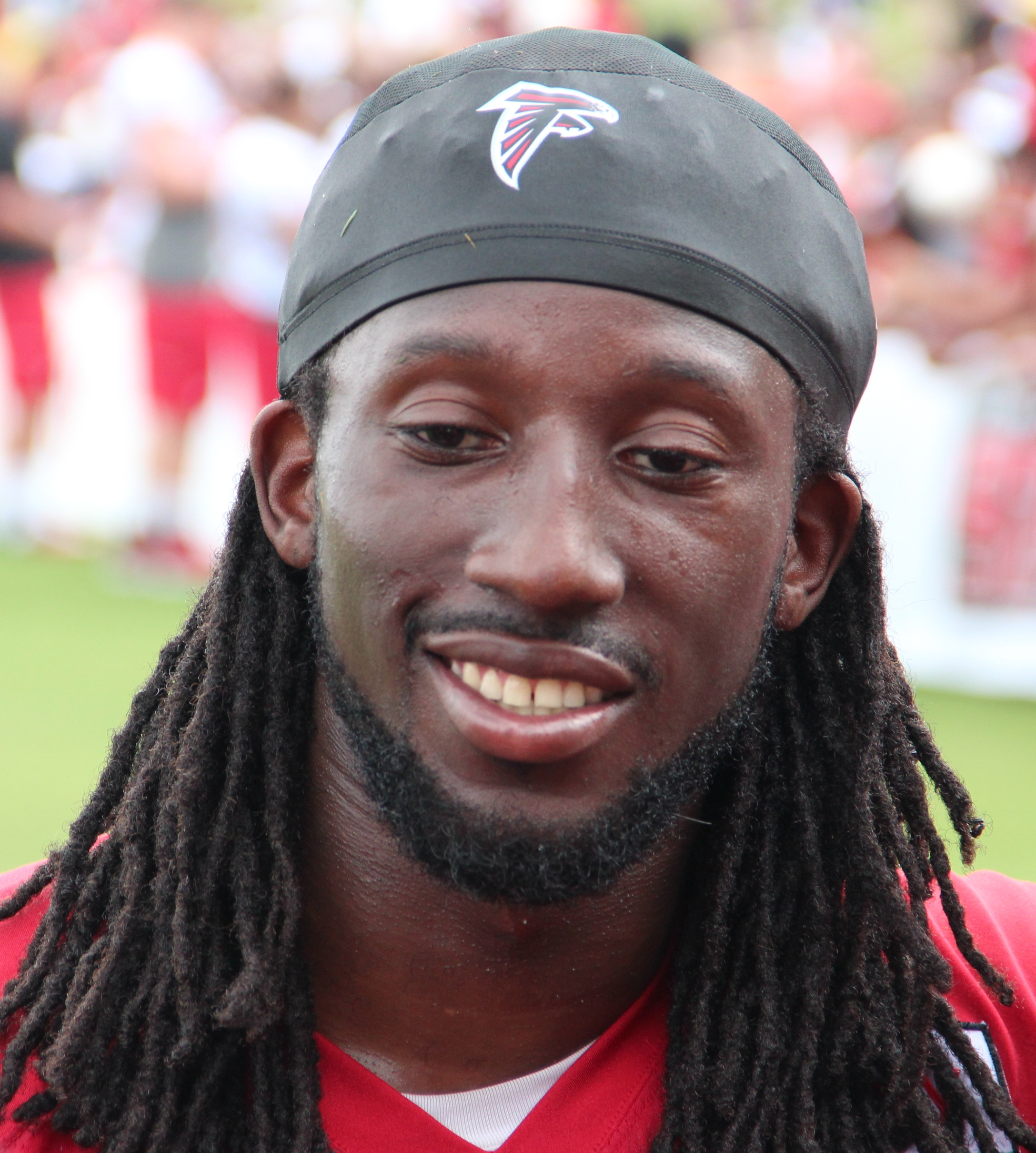
- Trufant with the Atlanta Falcons in 2015

No. 21, 23, 31, 10
- Position: Cornerback

Personal information
- Born: September 10, 1990 (age 36); Tacoma, Washington, U.S.
- Listed height: 6 ft 1 in (1.85 m)
- Listed weight: 190 lb (86 kg)

Career information
- High school: Woodrow Wilson (Tacoma)
- College: Washington (2009–2012)
- NFL draft: 2013: 1st round, 22nd overall pick

Career history
- Atlanta Falcons (2013–2019); Detroit Lions (2020); Chicago Bears (2021)*; New Orleans Saints (2021); Las Vegas Raiders (2021)
- * Offseason or practice squad member only

Awards and highlights
- Pro Bowl (2015); PFWA All-Rookie Team (2013); First-team All-Pac-12 (2012)

Career NFL statistics
- Total tackles: 366
- Sacks: 6.0
- Pass deflections: 89
- Interceptions: 14
- Forced fumbles: 3
- Fumble recoveries: 7
- Defensive touchdowns: 2
- Stats at Pro Football Reference

Desmond Trufant (born September 10, 1990) is an American former professional football player who was a cornerback in the National Football League (NFL). He played college football for the Washington Huskies and was selected by the Atlanta Falcons in the first round of the 2013 NFL draft.

== Early life ==
Trufant attended Woodrow Wilson High School in Tacoma, Washington. He was named first-team all-state by the Seattle Times following his senior season, and also earned a spot on the Seattle Times preseason all-state team. He was named to the All-Narrows League first team as both a running back and cornerback as a senior, after posting 47 tackles and eight interceptions as a junior, when he was an All-Narrows League first-team cornerback.

Trufant was also a standout long jumper and triple jumper on the Rams' track team, and took second place in the Class 4A state track meet in the triple jump (46 feet, 5.75 inches) and 11th in the long jump (21 feet, 2.25 inches) as a junior in 2008. He also played basketball at Wilson, earning second-team all-league as a junior.

Considered a three-star recruit by Rivals.com, Trufant was rated the 56th best cornerback in the nation. He accepted a scholarship to Washington over offers from Arizona State, Oregon and Washington State, brother Marcus' alma mater.

== College career ==
Trufant attended the University of Washington, where he played for their Huskies football teams from 2009 to 2012. As a senior, he was a first-team All-Pac-12 selection. The Huskies were ranked No. 16 in the nation (second in the Pac-12) in pass defense (188.9 yards allowed per game) at the end of the regular 2012 college football season.

== Professional career ==
External videos
- Trufant's NFL combine workout
- Desmond Trufant's 40-yard dash

Pre-draft measurables
Height	Weight	Arm length	Hand span	40-yard dash	10-yard split	20-yard split	20-yard shuttle	Three-cone drill	Vertical jump	Broad jump	Bench press
5 ft 11 5/8 in (1.82 m)	190 lb (86 kg)	31 1/4 in (0.79 m)	8 5/8 in (0.22 m)	4.38 s	1.50 s	2.54 s	3.85 s	6.67 s	37 1/2 in (0.95 m)	10 ft 5 in (3.18 m)	16 reps
All values from NFL Combine/Washington's Pro Day

=== Atlanta Falcons ===
==== 2013 ====
The Atlanta Falcons selected Trufant in the first round (22nd overall) of the 2013 NFL draft. He was the third cornerback selected in 2013, behind Alabama's Dee Milliner (9th overall) and Houston's D. J. Hayden (12th overall), and was also the first of two cornerbacks the Falcons selected, the second being second round pick Robert Alford (60th overall).

External videos
- Falcon's select Trufant 22nd overall
- Desmond Trufant: First draft

On July 24, 2013, the Atlanta Falcons signed Trufant to a four-year, $8.16 million contract that includes $6.94 million guaranteed and a signing bonus of $4.31 million.

Throughout training camp, he competed for a job as a starting cornerback against Asante Samuel, Robert McClain, and Robert Alford. Head coach Mike Smith named Samuel and Trufant the starting cornerbacks to begin the regular season.

He made his professional regular season debut and first career start in the Atlanta Falcons' season-opener against the New Orleans Saints. He made five combined tackles and a pass deflection in a 23–17 loss. In Week 7, Trufant recorded a season-high seven combined tackles and broke up a pass during a 31–23 victory against the Tampa Bay Buccaneers. On November 3, Trufant recorded five combined tackles, a pass deflection, and his first career interception off of a pass by quarterback Cam Newton in the Falcons' 34–10 loss to the Carolina Panthers. On December 15, Trufant tied his season-high seven combined tackles, along with two pass deflections, as well as intercepting a pass by quarterback Kirk Cousins in their 27–26 victory against the Washington Redskins. He finished his rookie season with a career-high 70 combined tackles (55 solo), a career-high 17 pass deflections, two interceptions, one forced fumble, and two fumble recoveries in 16 games and 16 starts. He exceeded expectations, being ranked eighth out of all cornerbacks in the league by Pro Football Focus. He allowed a 53% completion percentage and a quarterback rating of 75.2 to opposing quarterbacks in pass coverage. He was named to the PFWA All-Rookie Team.

==== 2014 ====
Trufant became the Falcons' No. 1 cornerback after they released Asante Samuel. He was officially named the starting cornerback, alongside Robert Alford, to begin the regular season. On November 9, 2014, Trufant recorded a season-high seven combined tackles and a pass deflection during their 27–17 victory against the Tampa Bay Buccaneers. The following week, he made a season-high two pass deflections and intercepted a pass by Cam Newton in a 19–17 victory over the Carolina Panthers. On December 29, the Atlanta Falcons fired head coach Mike Smith after the Falcons did not qualify for the playoffs, finishing the season with a 4–12 record. Trufant finished the season with 61 combined tackles (53 solo), 16 pass deflections, and three interceptions, playing in 16 games with 16 starts.

==== 2015 ====
The Falcons' new head coach, Dan Quinn, retained Trufant and Alford as the starting cornerback duo. In Week 11, Trufant recorded four combined tackles, two pass deflections, and his first career sack on quarterback Matt Hasselbeck during a 21–24 loss to the Indianapolis Colts. The following week, he made a season-high six solo tackles in the Falcons' 20–10 loss to the Minnesota Vikings. He finished the season with 42 combined tackles (35 solo), 11 pass deflections, a sack, and an interception, playing in 16 games with 16 starts. Trufant received his first Pro Bowl selection when he was named as an alternate in the 2016 Pro Bowl.

==== 2016 ====
He was named starter for the Falcons' season-opener against the Tampa Bay Buccaneers, during which he made a season-high five combined tackles, broke up a pass, and intercepted a pass by Jameis Winston during a 31–24 loss. On October 16, Trufant made five combined tackles and a sack on Russell Wilson in the Falcons' 26-24 loss at the Seattle Seahawks. In Week 9, Trufant made four solo tackles in the Falcons' 43–28 victory against the Tampa Bay Buccaneers. He left in the first half after suffering a shoulder injury. On November 29, Atlanta placed Trufant on injured reserve after they discovered he would need shoulder surgery, causing him to miss his first game in four seasons. Jalen Collins was named as his replacement. Pro Football Focus gave Trufant an overall grade of 78.9, ranking 30th among all qualifying cornerbacks in 2016. He finished the 2016 season with 31 combined tackles (25 solo), four pass deflections, two sacks, and an interception, in nine games with nine starts.

The Falcons went to Super Bowl LI after finishing atop the NFC South with an 11–5 record, while defeating the Seattle Seahawks in the NFC Divisional Round and the Green Bay Packers in the NFC Championship game. On February 5, 2017, the Atlanta Falcons lost 34–28 in overtime to the New England Patriots, after leading 28–9 going into the fourth quarter.

==== 2017 ====
On April 8, 2017, the Atlanta Falcons signed Trufant to a five-year, $68.5 million contract, which included a guaranteed $41.52 million and $15 million signing bonus.

New defensive coordinator Marquand Manuel, who replaced Rick Smith after the Falcons' collapse in Super Bowl LI. In Week 2, Trufant recorded two solo tackles, broke up a pass, an interception, and recovered a fumble off a strip sack by Vic Beasley and returned it 15-yards for a touchdown during a 34–23 victory against the Green Bay Packers on NBC Sunday Night Football. His performance earned him NFC Defensive Player of the Week. On November 20, 2017, Trufant made five solo tackles, a season-high three pass deflections, and intercepted a pass by Russell Wilson during a 34–31 victory at the Seattle Seahawks. Trufant was inactive for the Falcons' Week 13 loss to the Minnesota Vikings due to a concussion he received he previous week. He finished the 2017 season with 41 combined tackles (36 solo), 12 pass deflections, two interceptions, a sack, a fumble recovery, and a touchdown in 15 games and 15 starts. Pro Football Focus gave Trufant an overall grade of 84.9, which ranked 19th among all qualified cornerbacks in 2017.

==== 2018 ====
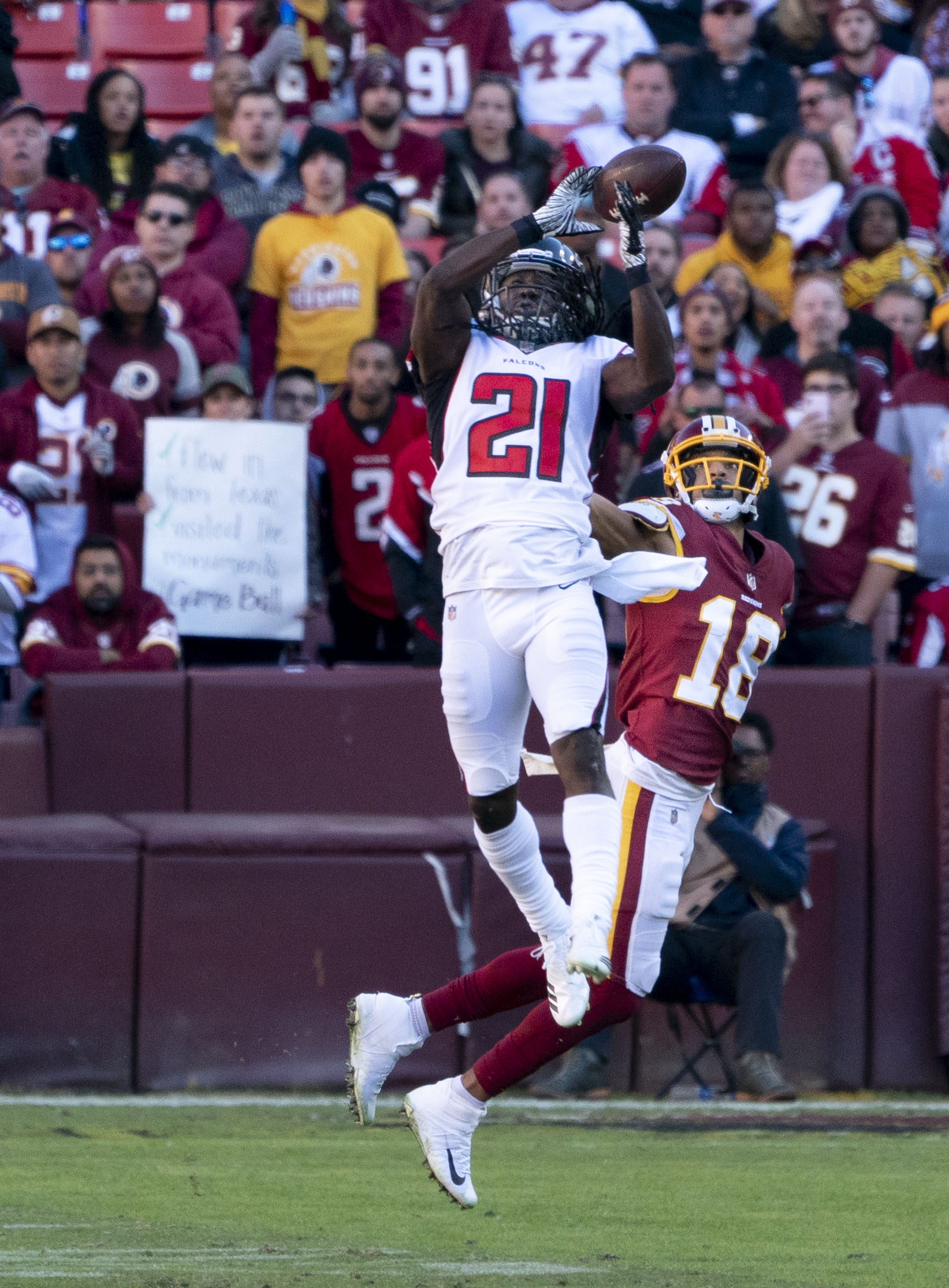
Trufant playing against the Washington Redskins in 2018.

In 2018, Trufant started all 16 games, recording 66 tackles, one sack, a team-high 12 passes defensed, and no interceptions.

==== 2019 ====
In Week 2 against the Philadelphia Eagles, Trufant intercepted quarterback Carson Wentz twice in the 24–20 win. Trufant missed four games in the middle of the season due to a toe injury he suffered during Week 5 against the Houston Texans. In Week 11 against the Carolina Panthers, Trufant recorded 6 tackles and an interception in the 29–3 win. In Week 12 against the Tampa Bay Buccaneers, Trufant had two passes defended and an interception. Trufant broke his forearm in Week 14, during the win against the Carolina Panthers, and was ruled out for the rest of the season. Trufant started 9 games during the season, recording 18 tackles, 7 passes defended, and a career-high four interceptions.

On March 18, 2020, Trufant was released by the Falcons after seven seasons.

=== Detroit Lions ===
On March 25, 2020, Trufant signed a two-year, $21 million contract with the Detroit Lions. In Week 9 against the Minnesota Vikings, Trufant recorded his first sack as a Lion on Kirk Cousins during the 34–20 loss. In Week 11 against the Carolina Panthers, Trufant recorded his first interception as a Lion off a pass thrown by P. J. Walker during the 20–0 loss. He was placed on injured reserve on December 2.

On March 17, 2021, Trufant was released by the Lions.

=== Chicago Bears ===
Trufant signed a one-year contract with the Chicago Bears on March 20, 2021. On August 31, Trufant was released by the Bears.

=== New Orleans Saints ===
On September 7, 2021, Trufant signed with the New Orleans Saints. He played in two games before being released on October 12.

=== Las Vegas Raiders ===
On October 19, 2021, Trufant signed with the Las Vegas Raiders.

=== Career statistics ===
Year	Team	Games		Tackles				Interceptions				Fumbles	
Year	Team	G	GS	Comb	Solo	Ast	Sack	Int	Yds	TDs	PD	FF	FR
2013	ATL	16	16	70	55	15	0.0	2	0	0	17	1	1
2014	ATL	16	16	61	53	8	0.0	3	19	0	16	0	1
2015	ATL	16	16	42	35	7	1.0	1	0	0	11	0	2
2016	ATL	9	9	31	25	6	2.0	1	9	0	4	2	0
2017	ATL	15	15	41	36	5	1.0	2	43	0	12	0	3
2018	ATL	16	16	66	55	11	1.0	0	0	0	12	0	0
2019	ATL	9	9	18	13	5	0.0	4	26	0	7	0	0
2020	DET	6	6	20	16	4	1.0	1	0	0	4	0	0
2021	NO	2	0	3	2	1	0.0	0	0	0	1	0	0
2021	LV	8	1	14	12	2	0.0	0	0	0	5	0	0
Total		113	104	366	302	64	6.0	14	97	0	89	3	7

== Personal life ==
Trufant's brothers, Marcus and Isaiah, have both played cornerback in the NFL. Marcus Trufant had a ten-year career with nine seasons as a member of the Seattle Seahawks (2003-2012) and Isaiah Trufant was a journeyman with multiple teams during a five-year career, three of which he spent with the New York Jets (2011-2013).

On August 15, 2021, Trufant's father died, and Trufant left the Chicago Bears training camp to be with his family.
