= Fred Booker (gridiron football) =

American football player (born 1978)

No. 21, 20, 23
- Position: Defensive back

Personal information
- Born: June 4, 1978 (age 48); Independence, Louisiana, U.S.
- Listed height: 5 ft 9 in (1.75 m)
- Listed weight: 199 lb (90 kg)

Career information
- High school: Hammond (Hammond, Louisiana)
- College: LSU (1997–2000)
- NFL draft: 2001: undrafted

Career history
- Philadelphia Eagles (2001)*; San Francisco 49ers (2002)*; Indiana Firebirds (2003)*; Amsterdam Admirals (2003); Washington Redskins (2003)*; New Orleans Saints (2004)*; Montreal Alouettes (2004); New Orleans Saints (2004–2005)
- * Offseason or practice squad member only
- Stats at Pro Football Reference

Fred Booker (born June 4, 1978) is an American former professional football defensive back who played one season with the New Orleans Saints of the National Football League (NFL). He played college football at LSU. He was also a member of the Philadelphia Eagles, San Francisco 49ers, and Washington Redskins of the NFL, the Amsterdam Admirals of NFL Europe, the Montreal Alouettes of the Canadian Football League (CFL), and the Indiana Firebirds of the Arena Football League (AFL).

== Early life and college ==
Fred Booker was born on June 4, 1978, in Independence, Louisiana. He played high school football at Hammond High Magnet School in Hammond, Louisiana. He recorded 61 tackles and six interceptions on defense his senior year while also catching 28 passes for 430 yards and five touchdowns on offense. Booker was named one of the top 100 players in the country by The Dallas Morning News in the class of 1997.

Booker was a four-year letterman for the LSU Tigers of Louisiana State University from 1997 to 2000. He recorded one interception in 1998, one interception for 50 yards and one touchdown in 1999, and two interceptions in 2000.

== Professional career ==
Booker signed with the Philadelphia Eagles on April 23, 2001, after going undrafted in the 2001 NFL draft. He was released on July 29, 2001.

Booker was signed by the San Francisco 49ers on July 27, 2002. He was later released on August 21, 2002.

Booker signed with the Indiana Firebirds of the Arena Football League on January 7, 2003. He was placed on injured reserve on January 28. He was placed on the exempt list on February 22, 2003, after signing with the Amsterdam Admirals of NFL Europe. Booker played in all ten games, starting seven, for the Admirals during the 2003 NFL Europe season, totaling 27 defensive tackles, four special teams tackles, one interception, and four pass breakups.

He signed with the Washington Redskins on June 18, 2003, but was released on August 30, 2003.

Booker was signed by the New Orleans Saints on January 27, 2004. He was released on July 29, 2004.

He dressed in one game for the Montreal Alouettes of the Canadian Football League (CFL) during the 2004 CFL season but did not record any statistics.

Booker signed with the Saints again on August 11, 2004. He was released again on September 5 but signed to the team's practice squad on September 7, 2004. He re-signed with the Saints on January 4, 2005. Booker was released on September 3, signed to the practice squad again on September 5, promoted to the active roster on September 30, released again on October 11, signed to the practice squad again on October 13, and promoted to the active roster again on October 21, 2005. Overall, he played in 12 games for the Saints during the 2005 season, posting seven solo tackles and two assisted tackles. Booker was released for the final team on May 2, 2006.

== Personal life ==
Booker's brother Robert Alford also played in the NFL.
