= Robert Alford (American football) =

American football player (born 1988)

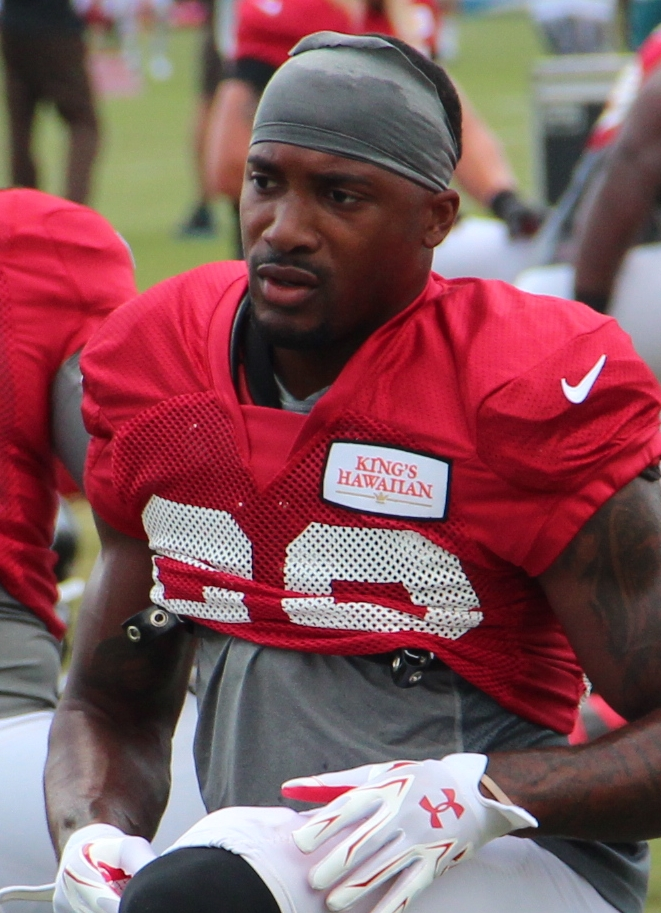
- Alford with the Atlanta Falcons in 2014

No. 23
- Position: Cornerback

Personal information
- Born: October 31, 1988 (age 38); Hammond, Louisiana, U.S.
- Listed height: 5 ft 10 in (1.78 m)
- Listed weight: 186 lb (84 kg)

Career information
- High school: Hammond
- College: Southeastern Louisiana (2008–2012)
- NFL draft: 2013: 2nd round, 60th overall pick

Career history
- Atlanta Falcons (2013–2018); Arizona Cardinals (2019–2021)

Awards and highlights
- First-team All-Southland (2012)

Career NFL statistics
- Total tackles: 340
- Pass deflections: 89
- Interceptions: 11
- Forced fumbles: 1
- Fumble recoveries: 2
- Defensive touchdowns: 2
- Stats at Pro Football Reference

Robert Alford (born October 31, 1988) is an American former professional football player who was a cornerback in the National Football League (NFL) for 9 seasons. He played college football for the Southeastern Louisiana Lions and was selected by the Atlanta Falcons in the second round of the 2013 NFL draft.

== Early life ==
Alford was born in Hammond, Louisiana. He attended Hammond High Magnet School and played high school football and ran track for the Hammond Tornadoes. He was a first-team all-District 7-5A selection at wide receiver, catching 10 touchdown passes as a senior for the Tors. He was chosen as the Tors' Rookie of the Year as a sophomore.

In addition to football, Alford was on the Tornadoes' track & field team, where he competed as a sprinter and jumper. He finished second in the 400-meter dash at the 2007 LHSAA Track and Field Championships, with a time of 49.62 seconds. At the 2008 Region II-5A Championships, he won both the 400 meters, recording a career-best time of 48.68 seconds, and the long jump, setting a personal-best mark of 7.09 meters.

== College career ==
Alford enrolled in Southeastern Louisiana University, where he played for the Southeastern Louisiana Lions football team from 2008 to 2012. After redshirting in 2008, he started nine of the 10 games in 2009, appearing in at cornerback and finished the season with 46 tackles (35 solo), and was also second on the team with five pass breakups. He was granted a medical redshirt after missing the 2010 season with an injury. He returned in 2011 and was named second team All-Southland Conference after establishing himself as one of the conference's elite cornerbacks. He started all 11 games for the Lions, and finished second in the Southland with five interceptions and fourth in the league with seven pass breakups. He finished the year with 52 tackles (45 solo), and his five interceptions was the eighth-highest single-season total in school history. In his final season, he was named first team All-Southland conference after finishing the year with 39 tackles (35 solo), including five for loss, four interceptions and eight pass break ups.

== Professional career ==
=== Pre-draft ===
On November 21, 2012, it was announced that Alford had accepted his invitation to play in the 2013 Senior Bowl. He became the second player from Southeastern Louisiana to play in the Senior Bowl and the first since Ronnie Hornsby in 1979. On January 26, 2013, Alford recorded five combined tackles and an interception to help Detroit Lions' head coach Jim Schwartz's South team that defeated the North 21–16. Alford had an impressive performance that also included an 88-yard kickoff return to start the game and immensely raised his draft stock. He was one of 60 collegiate defensive backs and 35 cornerbacks to attend the NFL Scouting Combine in Indianapolis, Indiana. Alford performed all of the combine drills and finished fourth among all defensive backs in the 40-yard dash. On March 26, 2013, Alford attended Southeastern Louisiana's pro day, but opted to stand on his combine numbers and only performed positional drills as team representatives and scouts from 15 NFL teams attended. At the conclusion of the pre-draft process, Alford was projected to be a second or third round pick by NFL draft experts and scouts. He was ranked the 10th best cornerback prospect by NFL analyst Mike Mayock and the 11th best cornerback by NFLDraftScout.com.

Pre-draft measurables
Height	Weight	Arm length	Hand span	40-yard dash	10-yard split	20-yard split	20-yard shuttle	Three-cone drill	Vertical jump	Broad jump	Bench press
5 ft 10 1/8 in (1.78 m)	188 lb (85 kg)	32 in (0.81 m)	9 1/2 in (0.24 m)	4.39 s	1.54 s	2.54 s	4.23 s	6.89 s	40 in (1.02 m)	11 ft 0 in (3.35 m)	17 reps
All values from NFL Combine

=== Atlanta Falcons ===
==== 2013 ====
The Atlanta Falcons selected Alford in the second round (60th overall) of the 2013 NFL draft. The Atlanta Falcons also drafted Washington's Desmond Trufant in the first round (22nd overall). He was the first player drafted from Southeastern Louisiana since Brett Wright in 1984. Alford also became the second highest selection in Southeastern Louisiana's school history, behind only Calvin Favron who was selected in the second round (46th overall) of the 1979 NFL draft.

On June 14, 2013, the Falcons signed Alford to a four-year, $3.40 million contract that includes $1.07 million guaranteed and a signing bonus of $853,744.

Throughout training camp, he competed for a starting cornerback job against Asante Samuel, Desmond Trufant, and Robert McClain. Head coach Mike Smith named him the third cornerback on the Falcons' depth chart, behind Samuel and Trufant.

He made his professional regular season debut in the Atlanta Falcons' season-opener at the New Orleans Saints and recorded one tackle, two pass deflections, and intercepted the first pass of his career during their 23–17 loss. He made his first career interception off a pass attempt by quarterback Drew Brees that was intended for receiver Marques Colston at the end of the third quarter. On November 3, 2013, Alford recorded two combined tackles, deflected a pass, and intercepted a pass by Cam Newton in the Falcons' 34–10 loss at the Carolina Panthers. After posting a 3–10 season, head coach Mike Smith elected to start Alford at cornerback over Asante Samuel for their Week 14 matchup against the Green Bay Packers. He made his first career start and recorded five combined tackles and deflected a pass during their 22–21 loss. The following week, Alford collected a season-high nine combined tackles in Atlanta's 27–26 victory over the Washington Redskins. He played in all 16 games with four starts as a rookie finishing with 40 combined tackles (28 solo), nine pass deflections, two interceptions, and one forced fumble.

==== 2014 ====
Alford entered the 2014 season slated as the starting cornerback alongside Desmond Trufant. On October 19, 2014, Alford recorded two solo tackles, defended two passes, and intercepted Baltimore Ravens' quarterback Joe Flacco twice during a 29–7 loss. During a Week 10 matchup at the Tampa Bay Buccaneers, he collected a season-high nine combined tackles in a 27–17 victory. The following week, Alford made one tackle before leaving a 19–17 win against the Carolina Panthers with a broken wrist. On December 14, 2014, the Atlanta Falcons placed him on injured reserve after it he underwent surgery and it became apparent he wouldn't be able to return during the 2014 season. He finished the season with 36 combined tackles, three interceptions, and 11 pass deflections in ten games and ten starts.

==== 2015 ====
Throughout his first training camp under new head coach Dan Quinn, Alford competed to maintain his role as starting cornerback against Akeem King, rookie Jalen Collins, and Phillip Adams. He was named the starting cornerback, opposite Desmond Trufant, to start the regular season.

On October 11, 2015, Alford recorded one tackle, two pass deflections, intercepted Washington Redskins' quarterback Kirk Cousins twice, and returned one for a touchdown during the Falcons' 25–19 victory. He intercepted Cousins' pass on the last play of the game and returned it for a 59-yard game-winning touchdown, marking the first touchdown and pick six of his career. Alford missed the Falcons' Week 9 matchup against the San Francisco 49ers after suffering a groin injury. In Week 17, he collected a season-high eight solo tackles in the Falcons' 20–17 loss to the New Orleans Saints. He completed the 2015 season with a total of 53 combined tackles (45 solo), 15 passes defensed and two interceptions, and a touchdown in 15 games and 15 starts.

==== 2016 ====
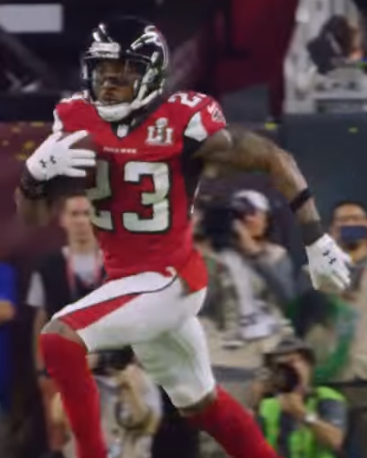
Alford picking off Tom Brady in Super Bowl LI

Head coach Dan Quinn named Alford and Desmond Trufant the Falcons' starting cornerback duo to start the regular season. He started the Atlanta Falcons' season-opener against the Tampa Bay Buccaneers and made five combined tackles and deflected two passes during their 31–24 loss. In Week 3, he collected a season-high eight combined tackles and deflected a pass in Atlanta's 45–32 win against the New Orleans Saints. On October 2, 2016, Alford recorded three solo tackles, defended three passes, intercepted two passes, and returned one for a touchdown in the Falcons' 48–33 victory over the Carolina Panthers. He returned his second interception off Cam Newton for a 30-yard touchdown, marking the second pick-six of his career. Alford finished the 2016 season with 61 combined tackles (50 solo), 19 pass deflections, two interceptions, and a touchdown in 16 games and 16 starts.

On December 8, 2016, the Atlanta Falcons signed Alford to a four-year, $38 million contract extension that includes $12 million guaranteed and a signing bonus of $3 million.

The Atlanta Falcons finished first atop the NFC South with an 11–5 record and received a playoff berth. On January 14, 2017, Alford started his first career playoff game and recorded five solo tackles in the Falcons' 36–20 victory over the Seattle Seahawks in the NFC Divisional Round. The Atlanta Falcons went on to defeat the Green Bay Packers in the NFC Championship 44–21 and went on to Super Bowl LI.

On February 5, 2017, Alford recorded 11 combined tackles, an interception, fumble recovery, and touchdown as the Falcons lost to the New England Patriots 34–28 in overtime. His touchdown came off an 82-yard return after intercepting quarterback Tom Brady in the second quarter. Alford was involved in a notable play with Patriots wide receiver Julian Edelman, who completed a very difficult catch off of Alford's shoe. Alford deflected Brady's throw into the air behind him, and Keanu Neal and Ricardo Allen merged on the ball to try an intercept it or knock it down. The ball bounced off Alford's left leg and almost into the turf, but Edelman caught it mere centimeters off the ground. This play set up the Patriots on the Falcons side of the field and allowed them to continue the eventual game-tying drive.

==== 2017 ====
Alford was named the starting cornerback, along with Desmond Trufant, for the fourth consecutive season. On November 20, 2017, Alford recorded a career-high ten combined tackles and deflected three passes in a 34–31 victory at the Seattle Seahawks. On December 31, 2017, he collected two solo tackles, made a career-high four pass deflections, and intercepted a pass attempt by Cam Newton during their 22–10 victory. Alford finished the 2017 season with a career-high 68 combined tackles (60 solo), a career-high 20 pass deflections, and an interception in 16 games and 16 starts.

==== 2018 ====
Alford returned in 2018 as a starting cornerback alongside Desmond Trufant. He started 15 games, finishing with 50 combined tackles and was second on the team with 11 passes defensed.

On February 5, 2019, Alford was released by the Falcons after six seasons.

=== Arizona Cardinals ===
On February 7, 2019, Alford signed a three-year, $22.5 million contract with the Arizona Cardinals. On August 31, 2019, he was placed on injured reserve with a broken leg.

On August 17, 2020, Alford tore his pectoral muscle and was ruled out for the 2020 season. He was placed on injured reserve on August 21. He was placed on the reserve/COVID-19 list by the team on December 21, 2020, and moved back to injured reserve on December 28.

Alford was released after the 2020 season on March 10, 2021, and re-signed to a one-year contract two days later.

Alford entered the 2021 season third on the Cardinals cornerback depth chart behind Byron Murphy and rookie Marco Wilson. He suffered a pectoral injury in Week 14 and was placed on injured reserve on December 18. He finished the season with 37 tackles, four passes defensed, and one interception through 13 games and five starts.

== NFL career statistics ==
Legend
**Bold**	Career high

=== Regular season ===
Year	Team	Games		Tackles					Interceptions					Fumbles			
Year	Team	GP	GS	Cmb	Solo	Ast	Sck	TFL	Int	Yds	TD	Lng	PD	FF	FR	Yds	TD
2013	ATL	**16**	4	40	28	**12**	0.0	0	2	0	0	0	8	**1**	**1**	-5	0
2014	ATL	10	10	31	24	7	0.0	**2**	**3**	21	0	21	12	0	0	0	0
2015	ATL	15	15	53	45	8	0.0	1	2	**76**	**1**	**59**	15	0	**1**	0	0
2016	ATL	**16**	**16**	61	50	11	0.0	1	2	34	**1**	30	19	0	0	0	0
2017	ATL	**16**	**16**	**68**	**60**	8	0.0	0	1	0	0	0	**20**	0	0	0	0
2018	ATL	15	15	50	43	7	0.0	0	0	0	0	0	11	0	0	0	0
2021	ARI	13	5	37	30	7	0.0	1	1	23	0	23	4	0	0	0	0
Career		101	81	340	280	60	0.0	5	11	154	2	59	89	1	2	-5	0

=== Playoffs ===
Year	Team	Games		Tackles					Interceptions					Fumbles			
Year	Team	GP	GS	Cmb	Solo	Ast	Sck	TFL	Int	Yds	TD	Lng	PD	FF	FR	Yds	TD
2016	ATL	**3**	**3**	**21**	**19**	**2**	0.0	0	**1**	**82**	**1**	**82**	**6**	0	**1**	0	0
2017	ATL	2	2	11	10	1	0.0	0	0	0	0	0	3	0	0	0	0
Career		5	5	32	29	3	0.0	0	1	82	1	82	9	0	1	0	0

== Personal life ==
His brother, Fred Booker, played in the NFL for the New Orleans Saints in the 2005 season.
