= Fred Booker (singer-songwriter) =

American singer

Fred Booker (1939–2008) was a Canadian author and singer-songwriter. Booker immigrated to Canada in 1966 from the United States and became a notable member of Vancouver's music and literary scenes. His intimately personal songs were often characterized by his versatile acoustic guitar riffs and resonating vibrato voice. Amongst Booker's influences were Black American poetry and spoken word, gospel, folk and jazz music, some of which he accredited to his experience growing up in a Baptist church and hearing the blues and gospel songs that were often sung in his childhood home. His experience as a black man in Vancouver and the "Pacific Rain Forest of British Columbia" became the subject of much of his poetry and songwriting, where he reflected on things like his time travelling and touring Canada, his hardships amidst the starkly contrasting class structure of Vancouver, and his continuous admiration for the mystery of both his urban and rural surroundings.

In 2006, the Vancouver-based black literary press Commodore Books published Fred Booker's first collection of short fiction entitled Adventures in Debt Collection, and in 2007, two of his short stories were dramatized on the CBC Radio One show Between the Covers.

== Discography ==
Book One: Songs, Voice & Guitar of Fred Booker. LP. Rulebook Records, 1974. Recorded at Stoney Production Studios, North Vancouver, BC.

Side One:
• Someone's Coming Back (3:30)
• Big Mike (4:23)
• Red Flowers (4:09)
• Someone Coming Back (4.30)
• Light On The Mountain (5:10)
Side Two:
• Seven Years Of Famine (6:30)
• Rain Is A Freedom Song (6:40)
• Powell Street Conspiracy (3:37)
• Going Back To Duncan (3:20)

Road Song. LP. Rulebook Records, 1976. Recorded at Stoney Production Studios, North Vancouver, BC.

Side One:
• White Rock (2:27)
• Vikki's Man (4:57)
• Amazing Grace (4:20)
• Brown Earth (4:58)
• You Can Learn Nothing More Standing Still (3:33)
Side Two:
• The Ballad of Suggs Jackson (9:53)
• Better Go Down Easy (5:15)
• Wild Alberta Rose (4:35)

== Bibliography ==
Booker, Fred. Adventures in Debt Collection. Vancouver: Commodore Books, 2006.
