= Super Bowl LI =

2017 National Football League championship game

New England Patriots (1) (AFC) (14–2)	Atlanta Falcons (2) (NFC) (11–5)
34	28
Head coach: Bill Belichick	Head coach: Dan Quinn
	1	2	3	4	OT	Total
NE	0	3	6	19	6	34
ATL	0	21	7	0	0	28
- Date: February 5, 2017
- Stadium: NRG Stadium; Houston, Texas
- MVP: Tom Brady, quarterback
- Favorite: Patriots by 3
- Referee: Carl Cheffers
- Attendance: 70,807

Ceremonies
- National anthem: Luke Bryan
- Coin toss: Former U.S. President George H. W. Bush, Former U.S. First Lady Barbara Bush
- Halftime show: Lady Gaga

TV in the United States
- Network: Fox
- Announcers: Joe Buck (play-by-play); Troy Aikman (analyst); Erin Andrews and Chris Myers (sideline reporters); Mike Pereira (rules analyst)
- Nielsen ratings: 45.3 (national); 57.0 (Atlanta); 54.3 (Boston); U.S. viewership: 111.3 million est. avg.
- Cost of 30-second commercial: $5.02 million

Radio in the United States
- Network: Westwood One
- Announcers: Kevin Harlan (play-by-play); Boomer Esiason (analyst); James Lofton and Tony Boselli (sideline reporters)

Super Bowl LI was an American football game played at Reliant Stadium in Houston, Texas, on February 5, 2017, to determine the champion of the National Football League (NFL) for the 2016 season. The American Football Conference (AFC) champion New England Patriots defeated the National Football Conference (NFC) champion Atlanta Falcons 34–28 in overtime. Super Bowl LI featured the largest comeback in Super Bowl history, with the Patriots overcoming a 28–3 deficit to emerge victorious. The game was also the first Super Bowl to be decided in overtime.

The Patriots' victory was their fifth, moving them into a three-way tie with the Dallas Cowboys and the San Francisco 49ers for the second-most Super Bowl wins. After finishing the regular season with a league-best 14–2 record, New England advanced to their record-setting ninth Super Bowl appearance and their seventh under the leadership of head coach Bill Belichick and quarterback Tom Brady. The Falcons, led by the league's top offense and MVP quarterback Matt Ryan, finished the regular season with an 11–5 record and the NFC's second seed. They were seeking their first Super Bowl title in their second appearance after last playing in 1998's Super Bowl XXXIII.

Atlanta scored three consecutive touchdowns to take a 21–3 halftime lead, which they increased to 28–3 midway through the third quarter. However, the Patriots scored 25 unanswered points to tie the game in the final seconds of regulation. In overtime, New England received the kickoff after winning the coin toss and scored a touchdown to claim the title. More than 30 team and individual Super Bowl records were broken or matched during the game, including Patriots running back James White's 14 receptions and 20 points scored and Brady's 62 attempts, 43 completions, and 466 passing yards. Brady was named Super Bowl MVP for a record fourth time and was the oldest player to receive the honor at 39; he would surpass both records in Super Bowl LV.

Fox's broadcast of the game averaged around 111.3 million viewers, slightly down from the 111.9 million viewers of the previous year's Super Bowl, but the total number of viewers for all or part of the game hit a record number of 172 million. Average television viewership for the halftime show, headlined by Lady Gaga, was higher at 117.5 million. Several media outlets regarded the game as the greatest Super Bowl of all time. NFL.com's "100 Greatest Games" ranked it the ninth-greatest game and the fourth-highest among Super Bowls.

== Background ==
=== Host-selection process ===
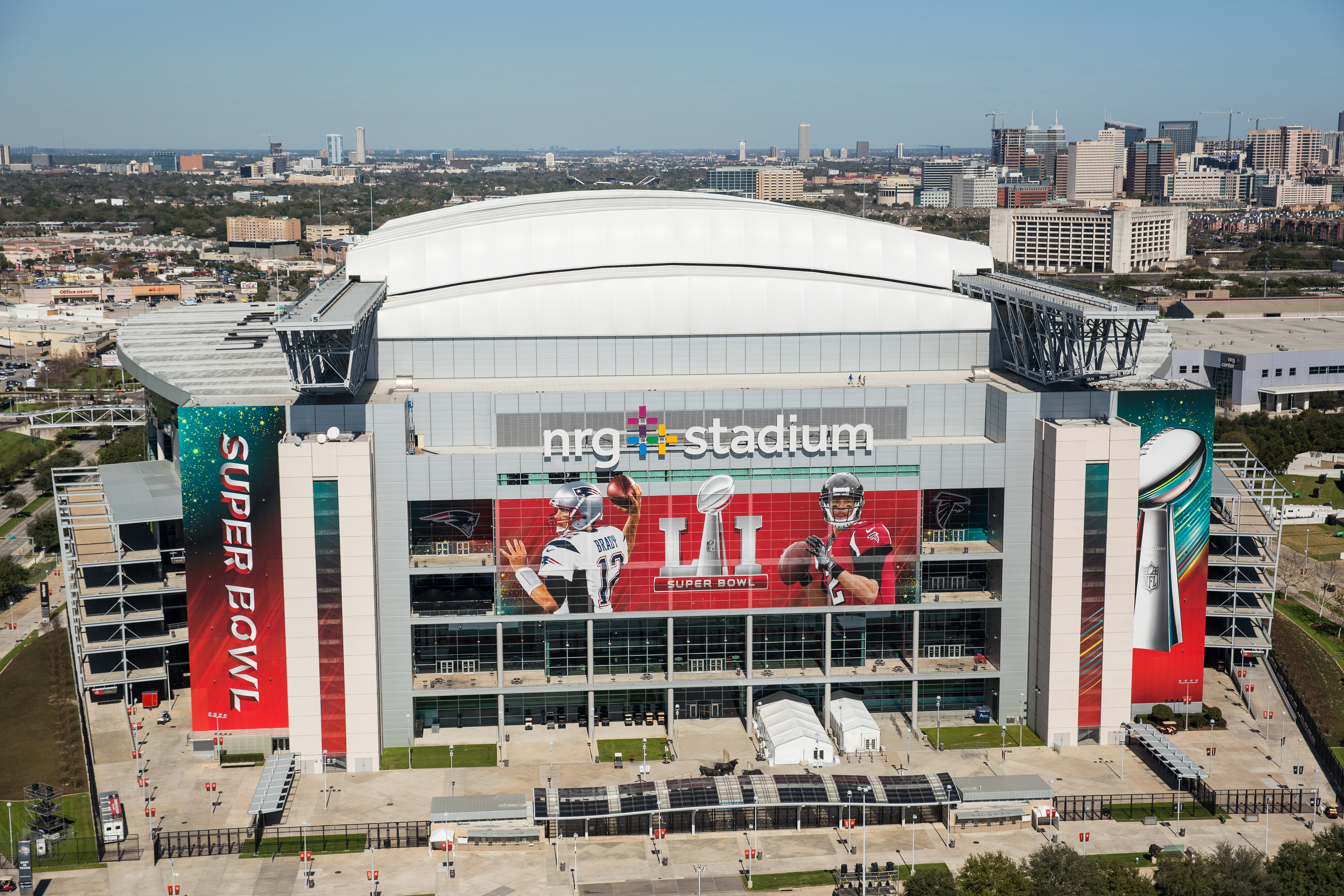
NRG Stadium in January 2017

The NFL selected the sites for Super Bowl 50 and Super Bowl LI at the owners' spring meetings in Boston on May 21, 2013. On October 16, 2012, the NFL announced that Reliant Stadium in Houston, which was renamed NRG Stadium in 2014, was a finalist to host Super Bowl LI. Houston then competed against the runner-up for the site of Super Bowl 50: Hard Rock Stadium in Miami Gardens, Florida. The South Florida bid for either Super Bowl partially depended on whether the stadium underwent renovations. However, on May 3, the Florida Legislature refused to approve the funding plan to pay for the renovations, dealing a blow to South Florida's chances. The NFL ultimately selected Houston as the host city of Super Bowl LI.

This was the second Super Bowl to be held at NRG Stadium, the other being Super Bowl XXXVIII in 2004, which also featured the New England Patriots against that season's NFC South champion Carolina Panthers. It was also the third time the Super Bowl has been played in Houston, with Super Bowl VIII in 1974 having been held at Rice Stadium. With the Astros baseball team reaching the World Series eight months later, Houston would become just the fourth city to host both the Super Bowl and the World Series in the same calendar year, following San Diego (1998), Detroit (2006), and Arlington, Texas (2011).

==== Proposition 1 controversy ====
Proposition 1, an ordinance which would have prohibited discrimination on the basis of sexual orientation or gender identity in Houston's housing, employment, public accommodations, and city contracting, was rejected by voters (60.97% opposing) during the November 3, 2015 elections. Nonetheless, the NFL announced it would not alter plans to have the city host Super Bowl LI. Houston Texans owner Bob McNair donated $10,000 to Campaign for Houston, an organization that opposes the ordinance, which he later rescinded.

=== Super Bowl week events ===
Fan-oriented activities during the lead-up to Super Bowl LI were centered around the George R. Brown Convention Center and Discovery Green park. Discovery Green hosted Super Bowl Live, a 10-day festival which featured live concerts and other attractions, including projection shows, fireworks shows, and a virtual reality attraction, Future Flight, in conjunction with NASA. The neighboring George R. Brown Convention Center hosted the annual NFL Experience event, which featured interactive activities and appearances by players. Super Bowl Opening Night, the second edition of the game's revamped media day, was held on January 30, 2017, at nearby Minute Maid Park.

Super Bowl Live was organized by the Houston Super Bowl Host Committee, which was led by Honorary Chairman James A. Baker, III, Chairman Ric Campo, and President and CEO Sallie Sargent.

According to a Bloomberg story, two of the most anticipated pre-Super Bowl parties were the invite-only 13th annual ESPN party and the Rolling Stone party. The ESPN party was hosted by Fergie and DJ Khaled and took place in a 65,000-square-foot warehouse in the Houston Arts District. The Rolling Stone party celebrated the magazine 50th anniversary. It took place at the Museum of Fine Arts, Houston and featured the performance of Big Sean, DJ Cassidy, Nas, Diplo and Busta Rhymes.

=== Tickets ===
In the beginning of February 2017 the NFL and law enforcement announced that tickets to Super Bowl LI would feature heat-sensitive logos to deter counterfeit tickets. On the front of each ticket was a full polymer graphic that was raised and the back featured a true color security label with Houston's skyline and the Super Bowl logo. The final security feature was a graphic on the lower portion of the back of each ticket printed with thermochromic ink. The HTX logo and the NRG Stadium image faded when heat was applied and returned when the heat source was removed.

The estimated average price for a ticket was $4,744.

=== Transportation issue ===
In late 2016, Uber had threatened to leave Houston ahead of the Super Bowl LI festivities, insisting various city regulations, including fingerprint background checks of drivers, were too burdensome and prevented drivers from working. Houston officials and Uber reached a compromise in December, which determined that Houston would continue to require a fingerprint check for drivers but eliminate requirements for driver drug testing and physicals through at least February 5.

== Teams ==
=== New England Patriots ===
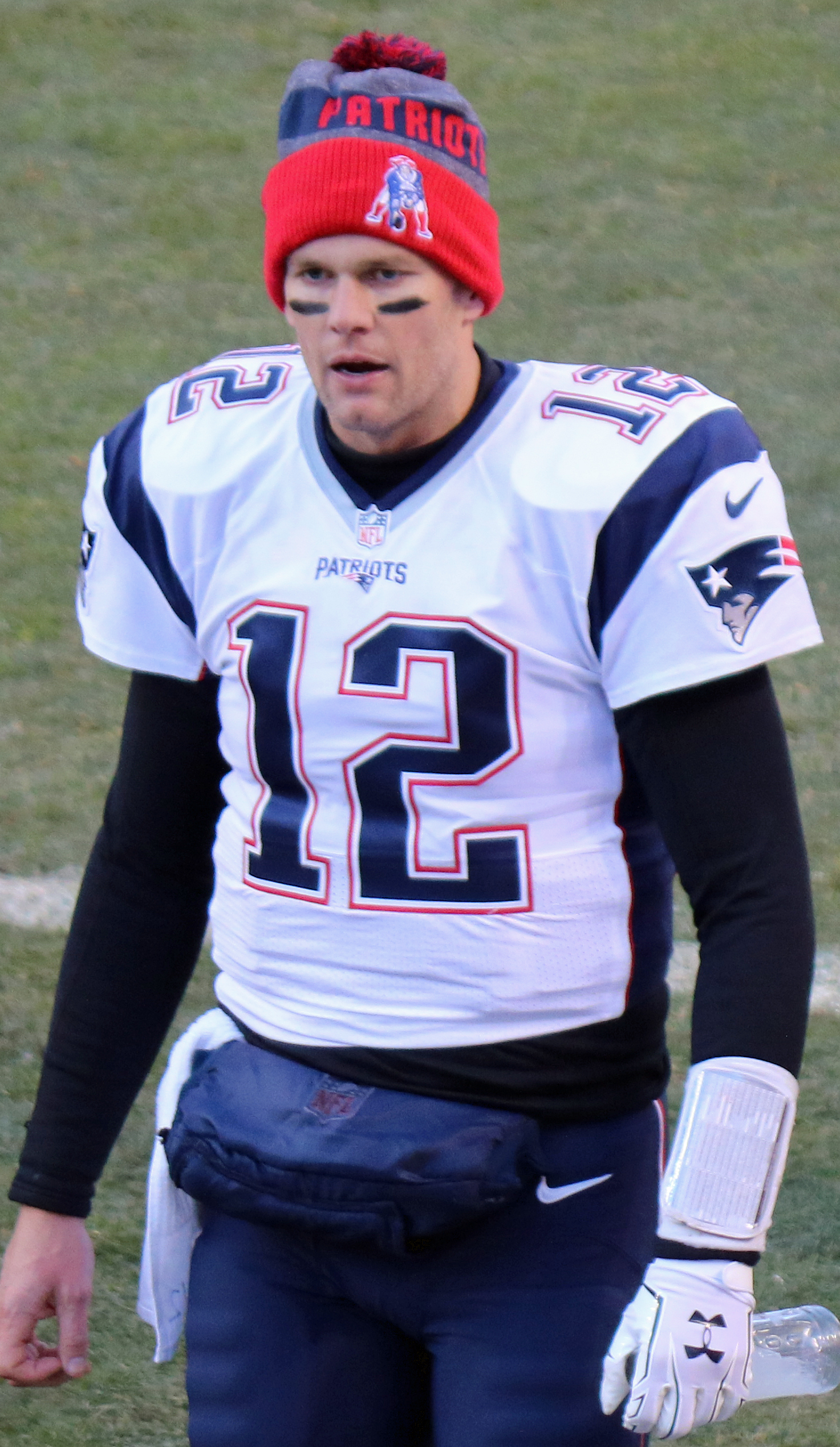
Patriots quarterback Tom Brady was playing in a record seventh Super Bowl

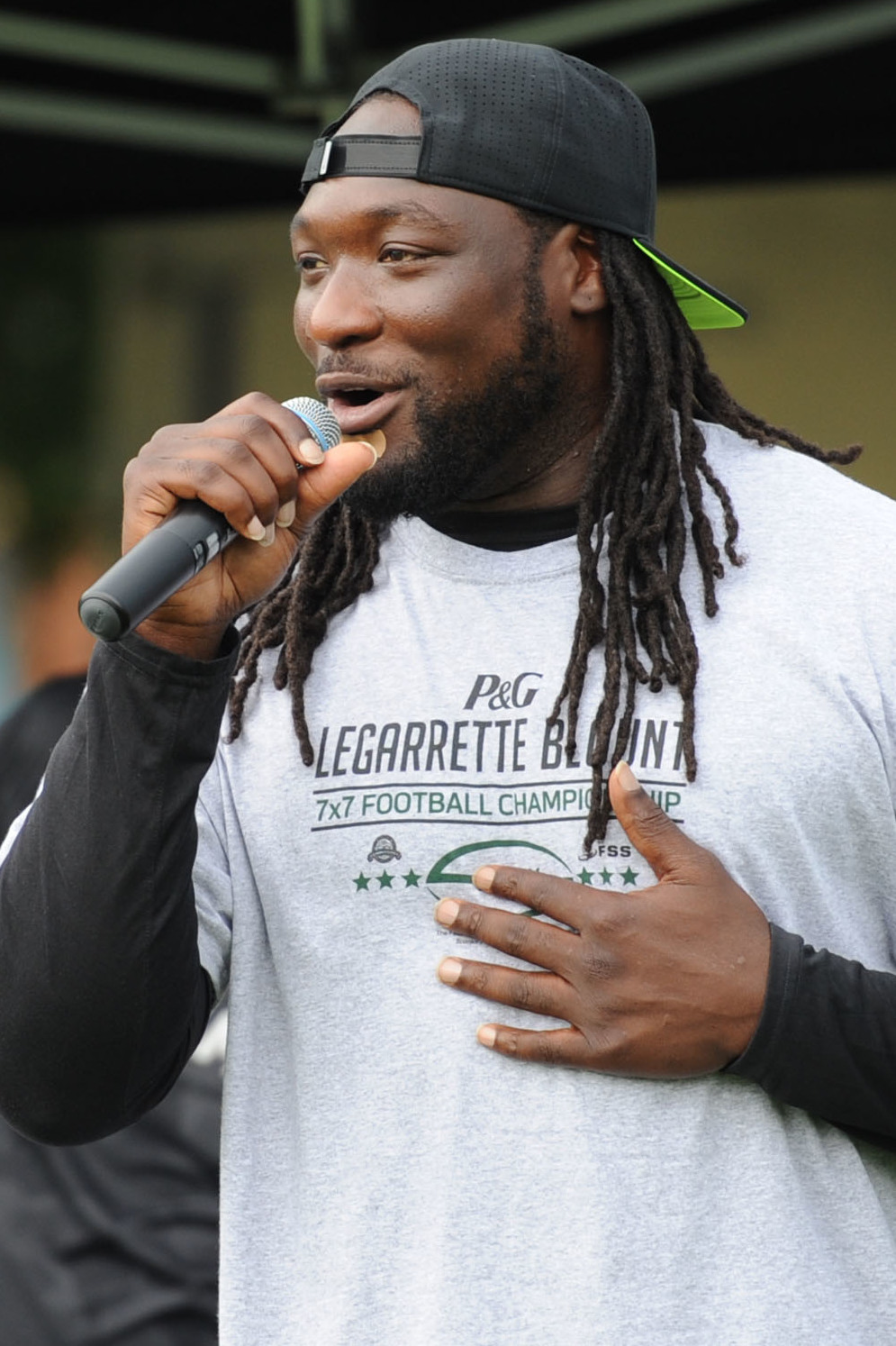
New England running back LeGarrette Blount led the league in touchdowns (18) during the regular season

In 2016, New England tied an NFL record, earning 12+ wins for the seventh consecutive season. Even though starting quarterback Tom Brady was suspended for the first four games, and All-Pro tight end Rob Gronkowski was lost to injury in midseason, the Patriots still recorded an NFL-best 14–2 record; their only losses were a shutout loss to the Buffalo Bills in Week 4 and a loss to the Seattle Seahawks in Week 10. They scored 441 points (third in the NFL) while allowing the fewest in the league (250).

Brady missed the first four games of the year on suspension due to a 2014–15 postseason scandal known as Deflategate. Backup quarterbacks Jimmy Garoppolo and Jacoby Brissett each started two games in Brady's place leading the team to a 3–1 start in Brady's absence. After his suspension ended, Brady took back command of the offense and went on to earn his 12th Pro Bowl selection, passing for 3,554 yards and 28 touchdowns with only two interceptions, while his 112.2 passer rating ranked second in the NFL. The team's leading receiver was Julian Edelman, who caught 98 passes for 1,106 yards and added 135 more returning punts. Wide receivers Chris Hogan (38 receptions for 680 yards) and Malcolm Mitchell (32 receptions for 401 yards) were also significant receiving threats. Gronkowski caught 25 passes for 540 yards before suffering a season-ending back injury in Week 13. Tight end Martellus Bennett stepped up in his absence, hauling in 55 receptions for 701 yards and a team-leading seven touchdown catches. Running back LeGarrette Blount was the team's top rusher with 1,168 yards and a league-leading 18 touchdowns. In passing situations, the team relied heavily on running back James White, who caught 60 passes for 551 yards and added another 166 on the ground. Running back Dion Lewis was also a valuable asset to the offense, rushing for 283 yards on offense and catching 17 passes for 94 yards.

Despite trading All-Pro outside linebacker Jamie Collins to the Cleveland Browns in the middle of the season, the Patriots defensive line was led by tackles Trey Flowers, who ranked first on the team with seven quarterback sacks, and Jabaal Sheard, who recorded five sacks of his own. Linebacker Dont'a Hightower earned his first Pro Bowl selection and made the second All-Pro team, compiling 65 tackles and 2 1/2 sacks. Linebacker Rob Ninkovich also made a big impact, recording 34 tackles, two forced fumbles, and four sacks. In the secondary, cornerback Malcolm Butler led the team with four interceptions, while Logan Ryan led the team in tackles and intercepted two passes. Safety Devin McCourty ranked second on the team with 83 tackles and notched one interception while earning his third career Pro Bowl selection. The team also had a defensive expert on special teams, Matthew Slater, who made the Pro Bowl for the sixth consecutive year.

By advancing to play in Super Bowl LI, the Patriots earned their NFL-record ninth Super Bowl appearance, as well as their seventh in the past 16 years under Brady and head coach Bill Belichick. The Patriots have also participated in the only other Super Bowl to be held at NRG Stadium; they won Super Bowl XXXVIII over the Carolina Panthers by a 32–29 score 13 years earlier. The Patriots entered Super Bowl LI with an overall record of 4–4 in their previous eight Super Bowl appearances, with all four of their wins and two of their four losses coming under the leadership of Belichick and Brady.

With his appearance in Super Bowl LI, Belichick broke the tie of six Super Bowls as a head coach that he had shared with Don Shula. It was also his record tenth participation in a Super Bowl in any capacity, which overtook the mark of nine that he had shared with Dan Reeves. This was also Brady's seventh Super Bowl appearance, the most appearances by a player in Super Bowl history.

=== Atlanta Falcons ===
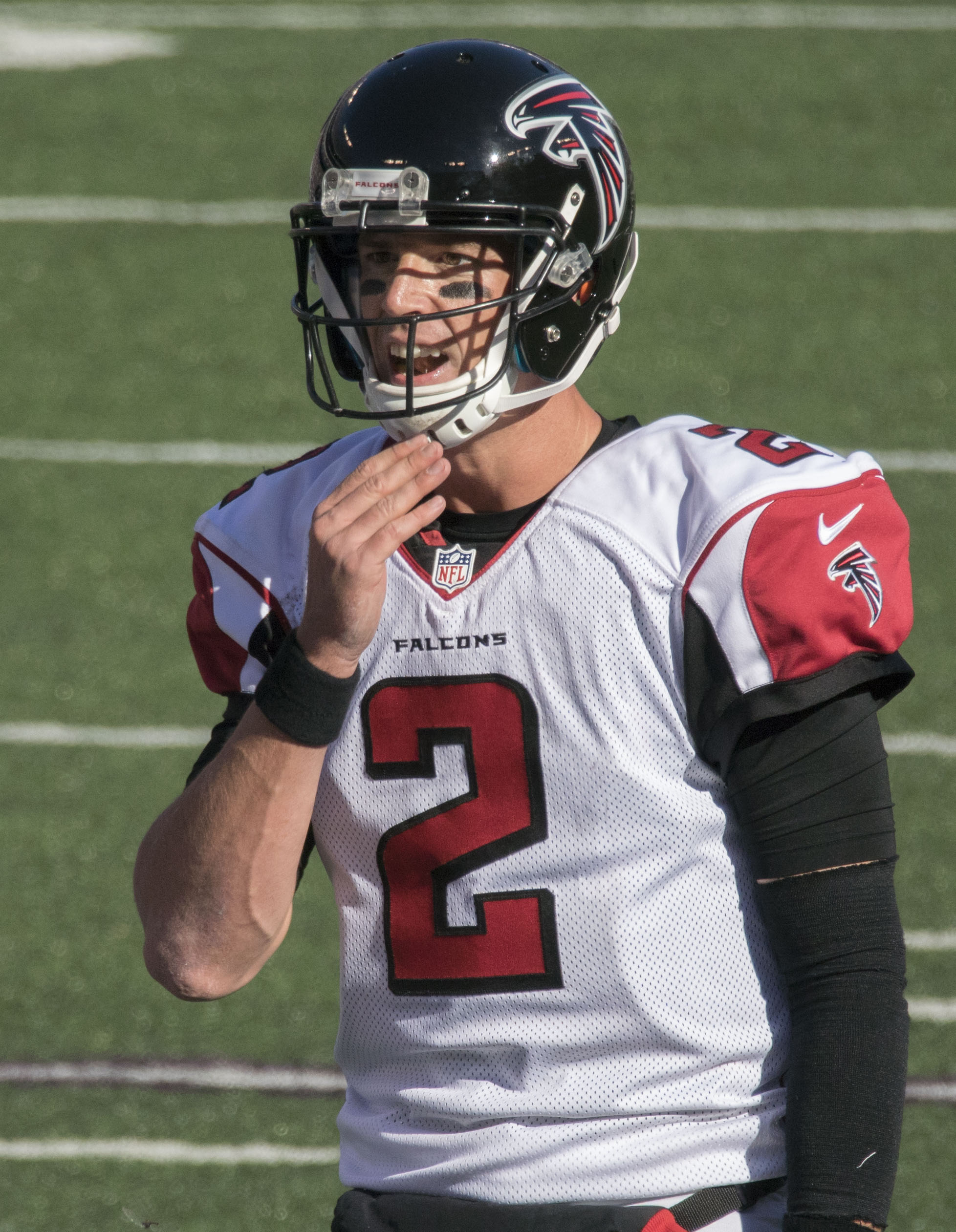
Falcons quarterback Matt Ryan was named the 2016 regular season MVP

The Atlanta Falcons, under second-year head coach Dan Quinn, finished the 2016 season with an 11–5 record, earning them the No. 2 seed in the NFC playoffs. It was a major reversal of declining fortunes for the team, which had failed to qualify to play in the playoffs in each of the last three seasons.

The Falcons were loaded with offensive firepower, leading all NFL teams in scoring with 540 points under the leadership of offensive coordinator Kyle Shanahan. Nine-year veteran quarterback Matt Ryan earned the NFL MVP and the AP NFL Offensive Player of the Year Award, as well as his fourth career Pro Bowl selection, leading the league in passer rating (117.1). While he ranked only ninth in completions (373), his passing yards (4,944) and touchdowns (38) both ranked second in the NFL. His primary target was receiver Julio Jones, who caught 83 passes for 1,409 yards (second in the NFL) and six touchdowns. Ryan had plenty of other options, such as newly acquired wide receivers Mohamed Sanu (59 receptions for 653 yards) and Taylor Gabriel (35 receptions for 579 yards and six touchdowns). Pro Bowl running back Devonta Freeman was the team's leading rusher, with 1,078 yards, 11 touchdowns, and 4.8 yards per rush. He was also a superb receiver out of the backfield, catching 54 passes for 462 yards and two more scores. Running back Tevin Coleman was also a major asset on the ground and through the air, with 520 rushing yards, 31 receptions for 421 yards, and 11 total touchdowns. The Falcons also had an excellent special teams unit led by veteran kick returner Eric Weems. His 24 punt returns for 273 yards gave him the sixth highest return average in the NFL (11.4), and he added another 391 yards returning kickoffs. Pro Bowl kicker Matt Bryant led the league in scoring with 158 points while also ranking third in field goal percentage (91.8%). Atlanta's offensive line featured center Alex Mack, who earned his fourth Pro Bowl selection.

The Falcons' defensive line was led by defensive ends Adrian Clayborn, who recorded five sacks and a fumble recovery, and long-time veteran Dwight Freeney, who ranks as the NFL's 18th all-time leader in sacks (122 1/2). Behind them, linebacker Vic Beasley was the team's only Pro Bowl selection on defense, leading the NFL in sacks with 15 1/2; he also forced six fumbles. Rookie linebacker Deion Jones was also an impact player, leading the team in combined tackles (108) and interceptions (three). The Falcons' secondary featured hard-hitting safety Keanu Neal, who had 106 tackles and forced five fumbles. Safety Ricardo Allen added 90 tackles and two interceptions. But overall, the defense ranked just 27th in the league in points allowed (406).

This game marked the Falcons' second Super Bowl appearance in franchise history, after having lost Super Bowl XXXIII in January 1999 to the Denver Broncos.

=== Playoffs ===
The Patriots, with the AFC's #1 seed, began their postseason run by defeating the fourth-seeded Houston Texans in the Divisional Round, 34–16. The next week, in the AFC Championship Game, the Patriots defeated the third-seeded Pittsburgh Steelers 36–17.

The Falcons, with the NFC's #2 seed, began their postseason run by defeating the third-seeded Seattle Seahawks in the Divisional Round, 36–20, racking up 422 yards. The next week, in the last NFL game ever played at the Georgia Dome, the Falcons racked up 493 total yards as they defeated the fourth-seeded Green Bay Packers 44–21 to win the NFC Championship.

=== Pre-game notes ===
As the designated home team in the annual rotation between AFC and NFC teams, the Falcons elected to wear their red home jerseys with white pants, which meant that the Patriots wore their white road jerseys. The game featured Atlanta's #1 scoring offense versus New England's #1 scoring defense. This was the sixth Super Bowl since the AFL–NFL merger in 1970 to feature a #1 scoring offense against a #1 scoring defense, with the team with the #1 scoring defense winning four of the previous five matchups.

Gambling establishments had the Patriots as 3 point favorites.

==== Team facilities ====
The Patriots stayed at the JW Marriott Houston and practiced at the University of Houston. The Falcons stayed at the Westin Houston Memorial City and practiced at Rice University.

== Broadcasting ==
=== United States ===
==== Television ====
In the United States, Super Bowl LI was televised by Fox, as part of a cycle between the three main broadcast television partners of the NFL. It was called by Joe Buck on play-by-play and Troy Aikman as color commentator.

As with Super Bowl 50, the stadium was equipped for Intel freeD instant replay technology, using an array of 36 5K resolution cameras positioned around the stadium to enable 360-degree views of plays. Fox introduced a new feature utilizing the system known as Be the Player, which composited the various camera angles into a single view of a play from the point-of-view of a player on the field. Fox constructed a temporary, two-floor studio in Discovery Green, which originated pre-game coverage, and broadcasts of Fox Sports 1 studio programs during the week leading up to the game, such as Fox Sports Live with Jay and Dan, The Herd with Colin Cowherd, Skip and Shannon: Undisputed, NASCAR Race Hub, and UFC Tonight.

The game was carried in Spanish by sister cable network Fox Deportes.

===== Ratings =====
An average of 111.3 million viewers watched Super Bowl LI, marking Super Bowl's second consecutive year of average viewership drop since its previous average high in 2015. However, viewership steadily increased since the end of halftime when it eventually became the first overtime game in Super Bowl history. Fox and NFL stated that 1.72 million viewers utilized its online streams, and by the conclusion of overtime, the broadcast gained 172 million viewers (more than half of the U.S. population of 340 million people that same year).

===== Advertising =====
Fox set the base rate for a 30-second commercial at $5 million, the same rate CBS charged for Super Bowl 50, leading to advertising revenue of $534 million for the single day event. Snickers announced that it would present a live commercial during the game. Nintendo broadcast an ad showcasing its upcoming Nintendo Switch video game console. Fiat Chrysler Automobiles broadcast three spots for Alfa Romeo, as part of an effort to re-launch the Italian brand in the U.S.

A spot from longtime advertiser Budweiser garnered controversy before the game for depicting Anheuser-Busch co-founder Adolphus Busch's emigration to the United States from Germany, its broadcast coming on the heels of U.S. President Donald Trump signing an executive order that bans travelers from several Muslim nations. Meanwhile, 84 Lumber aired a commercial depicting a mother and daughter journeying from Mexico to the United States, which had been edited following Fox's objection to its depiction of a border wall for sensitivity reasons.

Many films were advertised with Guardians of the Galaxy Vol. 2, Logan, Transformers: The Last Knight, Pirates of the Caribbean: Dead Men Tell No Tales, The Fate of the Furious and Ghost in the Shell. AMC and Netflix advertised their shows, The Walking Dead and Stranger Things, respectively, while Fox-owned National Geographic Channel teased its new historical anthology drama series Genius with an ad featuring Albert Einstein and a nod to Lady Gaga's halftime performance.

Fox was able to earn an estimated $20 million by airing four extra commercials due to the additional overtime period. Even without historical precedent, Fox negotiated deals with a handful of advertisers in case overtime were to occur.

==== Streaming ====
Online streams of the game were provided via Fox Sports Go; although normally requiring a television subscription to use, Fox made the service available as a free preview for the Super Bowl. Due to Verizon Communications exclusivity, streaming on smartphones was exclusive to Verizon Wireless subscribers via the NFL Mobile app.

==== Radio ====
In the United States, Westwood One carried the broadcast nationwide, with Kevin Harlan on play-by-play, Boomer Esiason and Mike Holmgren on color commentary, and sideline reports from Tony Boselli and James Lofton. The Westwood One broadcast was simulcast in Canada on TSN Radio. Each team's network flagship station carried the local feed: WBZ-FM for the Patriots (with Bob Socci and Scott Zolak announcing), and WZGC for the Falcons (with Wes Durham and Dave Archer announcing); under the league's contract with Westwood One, no other stations in the teams' usual radio networks were allowed to carry the local broadcast, and unlike in recent years when at least one of the two flagships was a clear-channel station, both the Patriots and Falcons use FM radio stations as their local flagships, limiting listenership to those within the local metropolitan areas or with access to those feeds via SiriusXM satellite radio or TuneIn Premium.

Spanish-language radio rights are held by Entravision as part of a three-year agreement signed in 2015. Erwin Higueros served as the play-by-play announcer.

=== International ===
	Rights holder(s)
Australia	Seven Network, 7mate, ESPN
Austria	Puls 4
Brazil	ESPN Brasil, Esporte Interativo
Canada	CTV, CTV Two, TSN (English), RDS (French)
Denmark	TV3+
France	beIN Sports
Germany	Sat.1
Hungary	Sport1 (Eastern Europe) (Hungary)
India	Sony ESPN
Italy	Italia 1, Premium Sport
Ireland	Sky Sports
Middle East and North Africa List of countries: Algeria; Bahrain; Comoros; Djibouti; Egypt; Iraq; Israel; Jordan; Kuwait; Lebanon; Libya; Mauritania; Morocco; Oman; Palestine; Qatar; Saudi Arabia; Somalia; Sudan; Syria; Tunisia; United Arab Emirates; Yemen	OSN Sports beIN Sports
Nepal	Sony ESPN
Netherlands	Fox, Fox Sports
New Zealand	Television New Zealand, ESPN
Norway	Viasat 4
Philippines	ABS-CBN
South Africa	SuperSport
Spain	Movistar+
Sri Lanka	Sony ESPN
United Kingdom	BBC (via world feed), Sky Sports (via Fox)

==== Canadian broadcast ====
Canadian broadcast rights to Super Bowl LI were subject to a legal dispute; although U.S. network affiliates are carried by pay TV providers in the country, Canadian law grants domestic broadcast stations the right to require that these signals be substituted with their own if they are carrying the same program in simulcast with a U.S. station ("simsub"). This policy is intended to help protect Canadian advertising revenue from being lost to viewers watching via U.S. feeds of a program. In 2016, as part of a larger series of regulatory reforms, the Canadian Radio-television and Telecommunications Commission (CRTC) banned the Super Bowl from being substituted under these circumstances, meaning that the telecast on CTV—a simulcast of the U.S. telecast with Canadian advertising inserted, would co-exist with feeds of the game from U.S. network affiliates. The CRTC cited dissatisfaction surrounding the practice from Canadian viewers—particularly the unavailability of the U.S. commercials, which the CRTC cited as being an "integral part" of the game based on this reception, but also other technical problems caused by poorly implemented simsubs (such as reduced quality and missing content due to mistimed transitions back into the U.S. program feed).

The NFL's Canadian rights holder Bell Media, as well as the league itself, have displayed objections to the policy; Bell felt that the decision devalued its exclusive Canadian rights to the game, and violated Canada's Broadcasting Act, which forbids the "making of regulations singling out a particular program or licensee." On November 2, 2016, Bell was granted the right to challenge the ruling in the Federal Court of Appeal. Bell, the NFL, and government representatives from both Canada and the U.S., have lobbied the CRTC for the rule to be retracted. However, court action on the ruling was not taken in time for the game, meaning that it was in effect for the first time during Super Bowl LI. Bell Media cited the decision, among other factors, as justification for a planned series of layoffs it announced on January 31, 2017.

The simsub prohibition only applied to the game itself, and not pre-game or post-game programming (which was simulcast with Fox and subject to simsub). In an attempt to mitigate the loss of de facto exclusivity to the clean U.S. feeds, Bell simulcast the game across CTV Two and TSN in addition to CTV, and organized a sponsored sweepstakes in which viewers could earn entries to win cash and automobile prizes by texting keywords displayed during the Canadian telecast. Montreal Gazette media analyst Steve Faguy felt that these promotions were an attempt to offset the loss of viewership by carrying the game across as many of its channels as possible, and providing incentives for viewers to watch the game on CTV instead of Fox. He further noted that Bell still had exclusive rights to stream the game in Canada via CTV's TV Everywhere services, as the CRTC does not regulate web content, and Fox's online stream is only available to U.S. users. Consequently, some Canadian companies (such as Leon's and Pizza Pizza) took advantage of the CRTC decision by buying local advertising time during the game from Fox affiliates distributed in Canada in order to target these viewers, such as KAYU-TV in Spokane (which is widely carried by television providers in the significantly larger markets of Calgary and Edmonton, Alberta).

Viewership of Super Bowl LI across the three English-language Bell Media properties broadcasting it was down by 39% in comparison to Super Bowl 50, with only 4.47 million viewers. Viewership on the French-language telecast presented by TSN's sister network RDS was in line with that of Super Bowl 50. It is not known how many Canadian viewers watched the game via Fox, as neither Nielsen or Canadian ratings provider Numeris calculate Canadian viewership of American broadcasters.

==== UK radio ====
The United Kingdom's BBC Radio 5 Live produced a commercial-free broadcast, with Darren Fletcher and Rocky Boiman returning.

== Entertainment ==
=== Pre-game ===
"May this year's Super Bowl be a sign of peace, friendship, and solidarity to the world."

— Pope Francis indicated that by participating in sports events, people show an ability to go beyond self-interests and build friendship and solidarity with one another.

During pre-game festivities, the NFL honored members of the Pro Football Hall of Fame that had played college football at historically black colleges and universities. Of the 303 members of the Hall of Fame, 29 were from HBCUs.

The Patriots took the field first as the designated away team to Ozzy Osbourne's "Crazy Train". The Falcons took the field second as the designated home team to Trick Daddy's "Let's Go". Both teams' season recaps were presented by Ving Rhames.

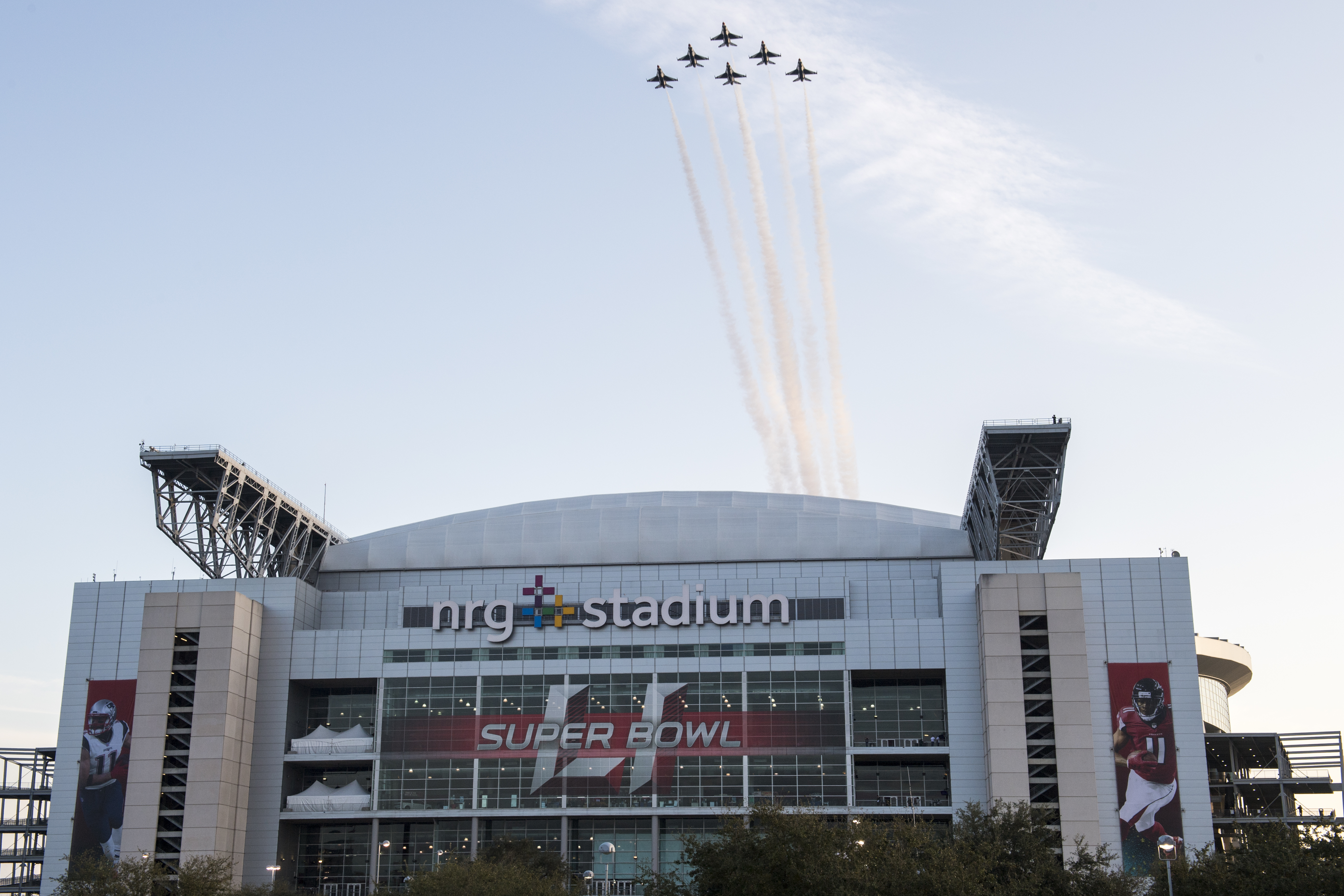
The United States Air Force Thunderbirds perform the flyover of Super Bowl LI in Houston, Texas, Feb. 5, 2017. (U.S. Air Force Photo by Tech. Sgt. Christopher Boitz)

Before the game, American country music singer and songwriter Luke Bryan sang the US national anthem. Bryan was the first male performer to sing the national anthem at a Super Bowl since Billy Joel at Super Bowl XLI and the first male country singer since Garth Brooks in Super Bowl XXVII. Immediately before Bryan sang the national anthem, Phillipa Soo, Renée Elise Goldsberry and Jasmine Cephas Jones, who originated the roles of the Schuyler sisters in the Broadway musical Hamilton, performed "America the Beautiful". The anthem concluded with a flyover by the U.S. Air Force Thunderbirds demonstration team in their custom painted F-16C Fighting Falcons.

After the national anthem, former President George H. W. Bush performed the coin toss alongside his wife, Barbara. The Patriots called heads, but the Falcons won the coin toss with tails. The Falcons chose to defer to the second half.

=== Halftime show ===
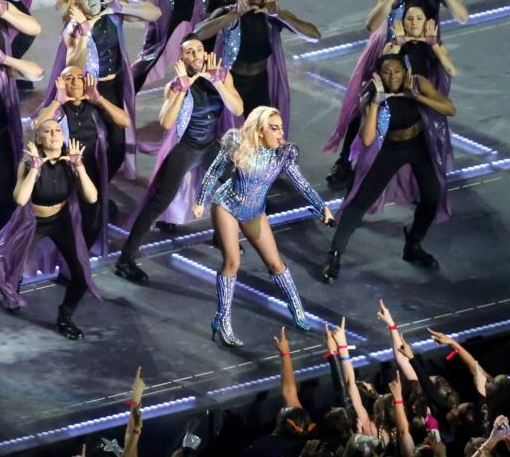
Lady Gaga performing "Born This Way" during the halftime show

On September 29, 2016, Lady Gaga, who had performed the national anthem the previous year at Super Bowl 50, confirmed that she would be performing at the Super Bowl LI halftime show on her Instagram account with the message: "It's not an illusion. The rumors are true. This year the SUPER BOWL goes GAGA!" Fox Sports president and executive producer of the show, John Entz, confirmed Gaga's involvement adding "[She] is one of the most electric performers of our generation, and we couldn't be happier with the choice to have her headline the Super Bowl LI Halftime Show," he also said that it would be "an incredible night."

Lady Gaga opened the halftime show with a combination of "God Bless America" and "This Land Is Your Land". Her performance also included some of her biggest hit songs, such as "Poker Face", "Born This Way", "Million Reasons", and "Bad Romance" and was accompanied by a swarm of 300 LED-equipped Intel drones forming an American flag in the sky in a pre-recorded segment.

Falcons wide receiver Mohamed Sanu stated the long length of the halftime show played a part in Atlanta ultimately losing the game. Teams on average are off the field for fifteen minutes during halftime, but Super Bowl halftimes are considerably longer. Unlike the Falcons, it appears Bill Belichick actually incorporated the length of the show into the team's practices. Sanu's argument is contradicted by the fact that Atlanta marched the ball downfield and scored a touchdown right out of halftime.

== Game summary ==
External videos
- Full game broadcast on Fox on YouTube

=== First half ===
The first quarter was scoreless, with each team punting twice. The longest play from scrimmage was the Falcons' first offensive play, a 37-yard run by running back Devonta Freeman. Although this did not lead to any points, it was the longest rushing play of the game.

On the first play of the second quarter, Patriots quarterback Brady completed a 27-yard pass to wide receiver Julian Edelman to reach the Atlanta 33-yard line. But on the next play, linebacker Deion Jones stripped the ball from running back LeGarrette Blount, and cornerback Robert Alford recovered the fumble on the 29-yard line. Atlanta capitalized on the turnover, moving the ball 71 yards in five plays. First, quarterback Matt Ryan completed back-to-back passes to wide receiver Julio Jones for gains of 19 and 23 yards, then Freeman ran the ball on the next three plays, covering the remaining 29 yards to the end zone, with the last carry being a 5-yard touchdown run that put the Falcons into a 7–0 lead.

After forcing New England to a three-and-out on their next possession, Atlanta put together another five-play scoring drive, this one in 62 yards. Ryan started the drive with a 24-yard completion to wide receiver Taylor Gabriel, then completed a pass to Jones for an 18-yard gain. On 3rd-and-9, he threw a 19-yard touchdown pass to tight end Austin Hooper, giving the Falcons a 14–0 lead.

The Patriots responded with a drive to the Atlanta 23, aided by two receptions by tight end Martellus Bennett for 25 yards and three holding penalties against the Atlanta defense, each one giving New England a first down on a third down play. However, on 3rd-and-6, Brady threw a pass intended for wide receiver Danny Amendola that was intercepted and returned 82 yards for a touchdown by Alford, increasing the Falcons' lead to 21–0. It was the first time in his career that Brady had thrown a pick six in his 33 postseason games, and Alford's 82-yard return was the second longest interception return in Super Bowl history.

Getting the ball back on his own 25-yard line with 2:20 left in the half, Brady completed a 15-yard pass to Bennett, then a short pass to running back James White, who took off for a 28-yard gain. The drive stalled at the Atlanta 20-yard line, but kicker Stephen Gostkowski made a successful 41-yard field goal with two seconds left on the clock to send the teams into halftime with the score 21–3 in favor of the Falcons.

=== Second half ===
After forcing Atlanta to punt to start the second half, the Patriots had an early scoring opportunity when Edelman returned Matt Bosher's punt 26 yards to the New England 47-yard line, but they could not gain a first down on the drive. The Falcons started their next drive on their own 15-yard line; Ryan completed two long passes to Gabriel for gains of 17 and 35 yards, followed by a 13-yard pass to wide receiver Mohamed Sanu, to bring the ball to the New England 28-yard line. Three plays later, Ryan finished the eight-play, 85-yard drive with a 6-yard touchdown pass to running back Tevin Coleman, giving the Falcons a 28–3 lead with 8:31 left in the quarter.

The Patriots responded by marching 75 yards in 13 plays for a touchdown, with Brady completing five of six passes for 38 yards, the longest a 17-yard completion to Amendola on 4th-and-3 from the New England 46-yard line. Brady, not known for running the ball, also ran for a 15-yard gain (the longest rushing play by the Patriots in the game) on 3rd-and-8 from the Atlanta 35-yard line. Three carries by Blount moved the ball 15 yards to the 5-yard line, and then Brady threw the ball to White for a 6-yard touchdown. Gostkowski's extra point attempt hit the right upright, but the Patriots had cut their deficit to 28–9.

New England then attempted an onside kick, but the ball was recovered by Falcons linebacker LaRoy Reynolds, and a penalty against Gostkowski for touching the ball before it went 10 yards gave Atlanta even better field position. Ryan completed a 9-yard pass to Hooper to reach the New England 32-yard-line, but on the next play, a holding penalty on offensive tackle Jake Matthews pushed the Falcons back 10 yards. Then, after an incompletion, defensive end Trey Flowers and linebacker Kyle Van Noy shared a sack on Ryan for a 9-yard loss, forcing Atlanta to punt. Late in the third quarter, the Falcons' chances of winning were estimated at 99.8%.

On the first play of the fourth quarter, Bosher punted 42 yards, pinning the Patriots back on their own 13-yard line. Brady led the next drive, completing three passes to wide receiver Malcolm Mitchell for 40 yards and one to Bennett for 25 to bring the ball to the Atlanta 7-yard line. However, Brady was sacked twice by defensive tackle Grady Jarrett over the next three plays, forcing New England to settle for Gostkowski's 33-yard field goal, cutting their deficit to 28–12 with less than 10 minutes left. Atlanta had already used their first two timeouts on defense and equipment malfunction.

On the third play of the Falcons' ensuing drive, Freeman missed his blocking assignment on a New England blitz that allowed linebacker Dont'a Hightower to strip-sack Ryan as he was winding up for a pass, with defensive tackle Alan Branch recovering the fumble on the Falcons' 25-yard line. It was Ryan's first turnover in two months. New England soon cashed in their scoring opportunity in five plays, with Brady completing four consecutive passes, the last one a 6-yard touchdown pass to Amendola. White then took a direct snap in for a two-point conversion to cut the Patriots' deficit to one possession at 28–20 with 5:56 left in regulation.

On the first play of Atlanta's next possession, Freeman caught a short pass from Ryan and ran it for a 39-yard gain, the longest play of the game. Then on 2nd-and-9 from the Patriots 49-yard line, Ryan threw a deep pass to Jones, who made an acrobatic catch at the right sideline for a 27-yard gain, giving the Falcons a first down on the New England 22 with 4:40 left on the clock and a chance to cement their first Super Bowl title with a possible field goal attempt. However, the tired Atlanta offense began to face a resurgent New England defense on the next three downs. On the next play, Freeman ran for a 1-yard loss on a tackle by safety Devin McCourty. Then, two critical offensive miscues on back-to-back plays resulted in one of the biggest missed opportunities in Super Bowl history. Ryan tried to pass the ball on second down, but Flowers sacked him for a 12-yard loss on the 35-yard line. Ryan then completed a 9-yard pass to Sanu on 3rd-and-23 to get back into field goal range, but this was nullified by another offensive holding penalty on Matthews. Now out of field goal range and faced with 3rd-and-33 from the New England 45-yard line, Ryan threw an incomplete pass. Atlanta was forced to punt the ball back to New England.

Bosher's 36-yard kick gave the Patriots the ball on their own 9-yard line with 3:30 left on the clock and two of their three timeouts left. After two incompletions, Brady picked up a first down with a 16-yard pass to wide receiver Chris Hogan. After an 11-yard pass to Mitchell, Brady threw a pass that was nearly intercepted again by Alford. Instead, he batted the ball in the air, and it fell into the arms of Edelman, who made a diving catch as it bounced off Alford's shoe. Edelman just barely managed to get his hands under the ball before it hit the ground, securing it for what would be ruled as a 23-yard pass completion. Atlanta challenged the on-field ruling, but referee Carl Cheffers announced that the call stood, and the Falcons were charged their final timeout.

Brady's next pass to Amendola gained 20 yards to the Atlanta 21-yard line as the clock ran down below the two-minute warning. Two more passes to White gained 20 yards and gave New England a first down at the 1-yard line. With 58 seconds left, White scored on a 1-yard touchdown run, and Brady completed a two-point conversion pass to Amendola, tying the score at 28.

The Falcons started their drive deep in their own territory with just under a minute and no timeouts. Atlanta could not get past their own 27-yard line and punted, with Edelman fair catching the ball at his own 35-yard line. New England considered attempting a fair catch kick, which would be the first ever attempted in a Super Bowl. Instead, New England attempted a fake quarterback kneel running play for running back Dion Lewis, who gained 13 yards, but failed to score. This ended regulation and forced the game into overtime, the first for a Super Bowl, and the first NFL title game to do so since the 1958 meeting between the Baltimore Colts and New York Giants.

=== Overtime ===
The Patriots won the coin toss to start overtime and elected to receive the ball. Starting at their 25-yard line after a touchback, Brady completed passes to White, Amendola, and Hogan for gains of 6, 14, and 18 yards, respectively. Then, after White was tackled by Deion Jones for a 3-yard loss, Brady completed a 15-yard pass to Edelman to reach the Atlanta 25-yard line. White then took a lateral throw from Brady to the 15-yard line.

Brady's pass to Bennett in the end zone fell incomplete, but linebacker De'Vondre Campbell was called for pass interference, giving the Patriots 1st-and-goal on the 2-yard line. On first down, Brady threw another incomplete pass to Bennett that was deflected and nearly intercepted by linebacker Vic Beasley. On second down, White took a pitch and ran the ball right. He was hit by three Falcons defenders at the 1-yard line but managed to stretch forward and get the ball across the goal line before his knee hit the ground, scoring the winning touchdown and completing the biggest come-from-behind victory in Super Bowl history.

After trailing by 25 points, the Patriots won the game 34–28 and hoisted their fifth Lombardi trophy. It marked the first time in NFL postseason history that a team leading by 17 points or more at the start of the fourth quarter went on to lose the game. Previously, dating back to 1940, teams leading by 17 or more points after three quarters in playoff games were 133–0 in such situations.

=== Statistics and records ===
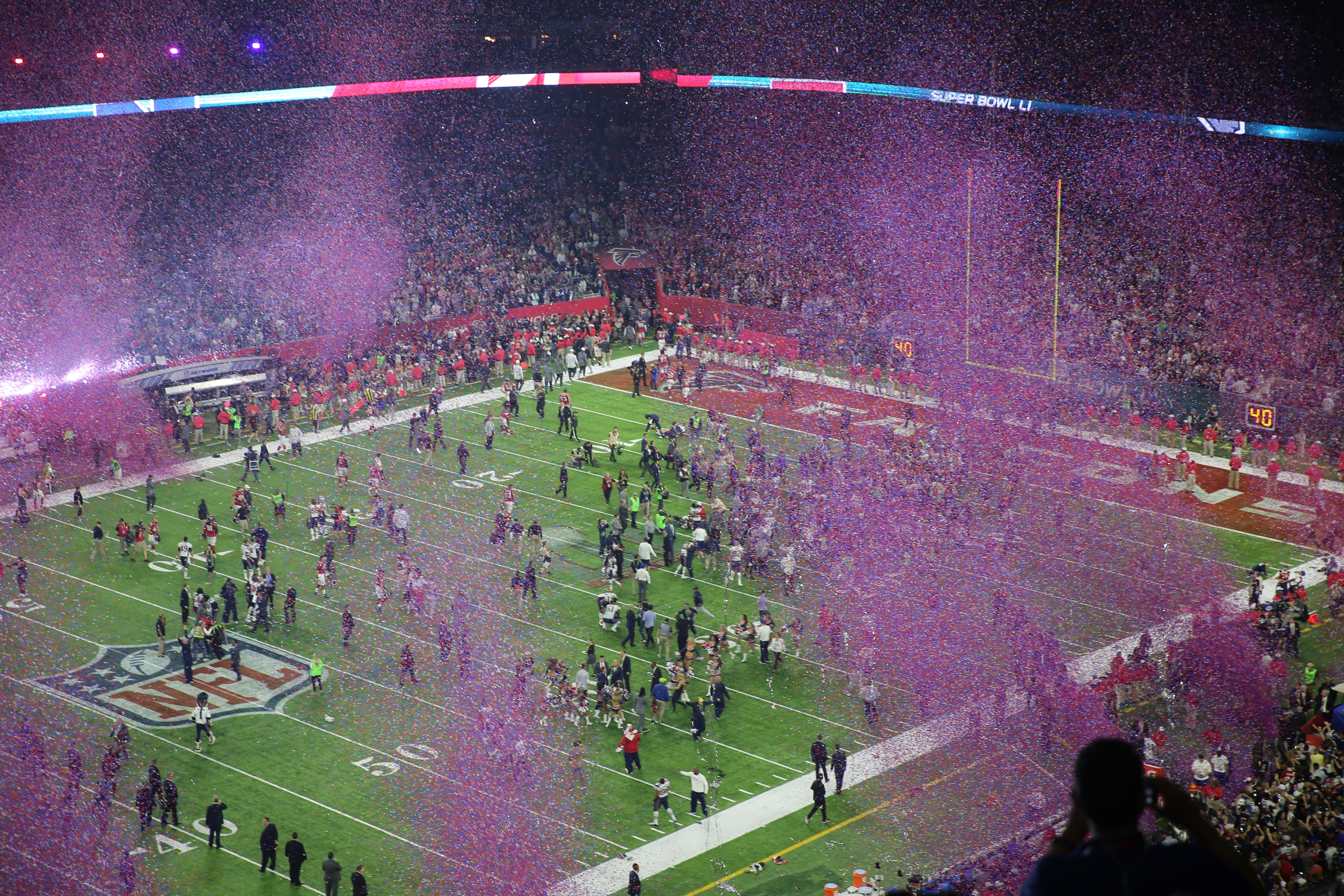
Confetti falls after the game

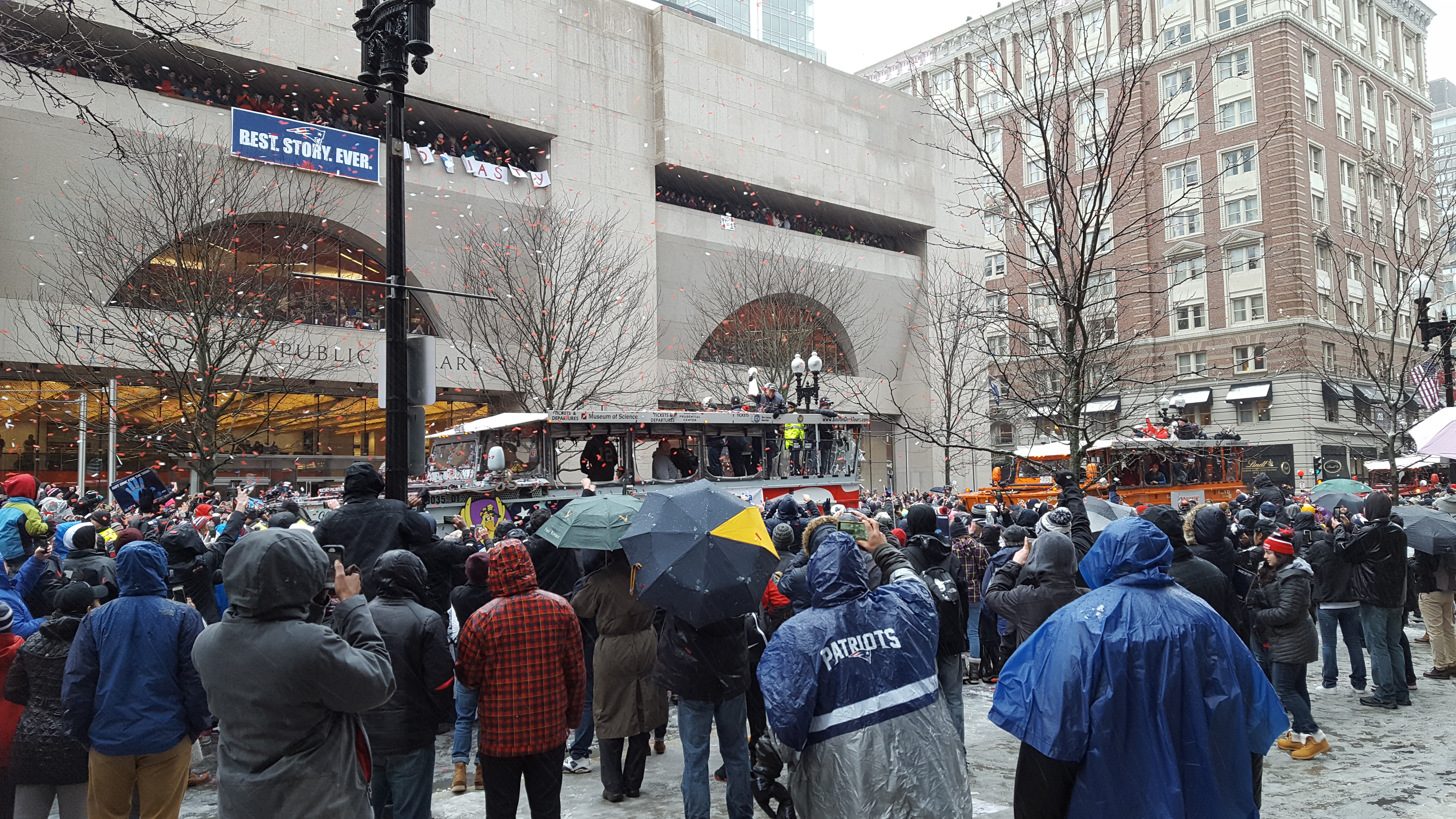
A parade took place in Boston two days after the game

Super Bowl LI saw more than 30 records either broken or tied. Brady completed 43 of 62 passes for 466 yards and two touchdowns, with one interception, while also rushing for 15 yards. His completions, attempts, and passing yards were all single-game Super Bowl records. Brady became the first quarterback to win a Super Bowl in which he threw a ball that was intercepted for a touchdown. He set the career Super Bowl records for games played (7), completions (207), attempts (309), yards (2,071), and touchdown passes (15). James White caught a Super Bowl record 14 passes for 110 yards, rushed for 29 yards, and tied a Super Bowl record with three touchdowns. He set the record for most points with 20. Brady said he felt White deserved the MVP award more than he did. Brady planned to give White the vehicle traditionally awarded to Super Bowl MVPs (he had given the truck from Super Bowl XLIX to Malcolm Butler) but found out there was no vehicle to give because the sponsor had decided to end its practice of donating one. Edelman caught five passes for 87 yards and returned three punts for 39 yards. Amendola recorded eight receptions for 78 yards and one touchdown. Flowers recorded six tackles and 2.5 sacks. The Patriots overall gained an NFL postseason record 37 first downs in the game.

For the Falcons, Ryan completed 17 of 23 passes for 284 yards and two touchdowns. Freeman was the top rusher of the game with 11 carries for 75 yards and a touchdown, while also catching two passes for 46 yards. Jones was the Falcons' leading receiver with four receptions for 87 yards. Robert Alford had 11 tackles (9 solo), an interception returned for a touchdown, and a fumble recovery. Grady Jarrett had five tackles and tied a Super Bowl record with three sacks.

The Falcons became the first team in Super Bowl history to return an interception for a touchdown and lose the game. Previously, teams returning an interception for a touchdown in the Super Bowl had been 12–0. The Patriots had two turnovers, while the Falcons only turned over once. This made the Patriots the fifth team to win a Super Bowl despite losing the turnover battle, joining the Baltimore Colts in Super Bowl V, the Pittsburgh Steelers in Super Bowls XIV and XL, and the Patriots in Super Bowl XLIX.

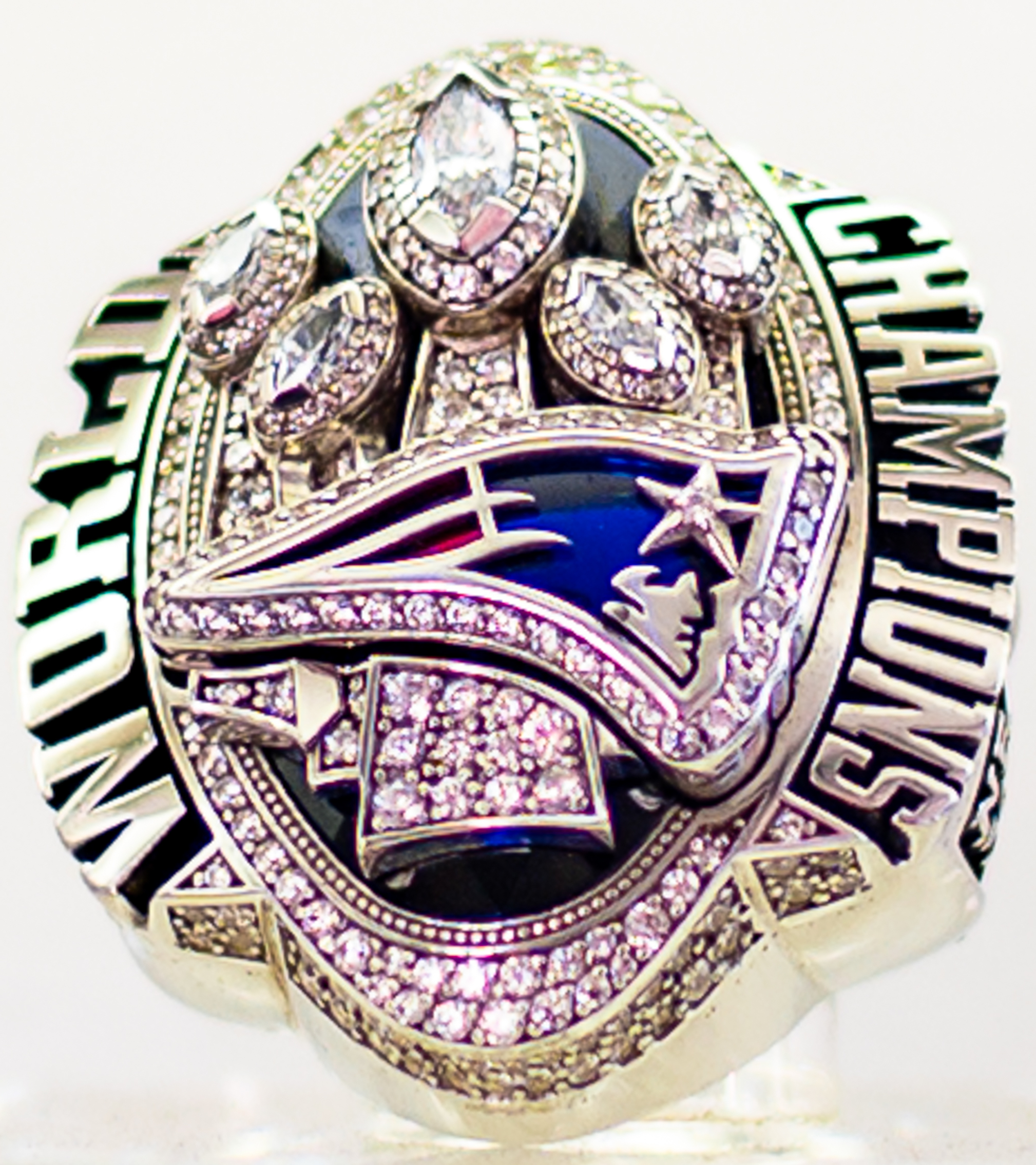
The Patriots Super Bowl LI ring, which highlighted the team's previous Super Bowl wins

The game set the record for the largest deficit overcome to win the Super Bowl (the previous record was 10, set by the Washington Redskins in Super Bowl XXII, matched by the New Orleans Saints in Super Bowl XLIV, and by the Patriots in Super Bowl XLIX); it is the fourth-largest comeback win in NFL playoff history, behind The Comeback (32-point deficit; Buffalo Bills trailed 35–3 and won 41–38), the wild card game between the Indianapolis Colts and the Kansas City Chiefs during the 2013–14 NFL playoffs (28-point deficit; Colts trailed 38–10 and won, 45–44), and the wild card game between the Jacksonville Jaguars and Los Angeles Chargers during the 2022–23 NFL playoffs (27-point deficit; Jaguars trailed 27–0 and won 31–30). The game set the record for the largest fourth-quarter comeback in NFL playoff history, as no team had previously won a playoff game after trailing by 17 or more points entering the final quarter; the Patriots were trailing by 19 points at the start of the fourth quarter by a score of 28–9. The Patriots won their fifth franchise championship, all under the leadership of Brady, the most by a single quarterback. Brady won his fourth Super Bowl MVP, the most by a player. This game represented the largest comeback in the history of the New England Patriots' regular season or post-season games, and Brady's career.

Super Bowl LI became the first in which the winning team never held the lead at any point during regulation time, and the first in which the winning team did not score on a PAT kick, as the Patriots missed their only PAT attempt, which occurred following their first touchdown, opted for two-point conversions after each of their next two touchdowns, and did not have to attempt the extra point after their game-winning touchdown in overtime. It was the longest Super Bowl at 63:58, but this was broken in Super Bowl LVIII, which lasted 74:57, breaking the record by 10:59.

=== Box score ===
New England Patriots vs. Atlanta Falcons – Game summary

Quarter	1	2	3	4	OT	Total
Patriots (AFC)	0	3	6	19	6	34
Falcons (NFC)	0	21	7	0	0	28

at NRG Stadium, Houston, Texas

- Date: February 5, 2017
- Game time: 6:30 p.m. EST
- Game weather: None (retractable roof closed)
- Game attendance: 70,807
- Referee: Carl Cheffers
- TV announcers (Fox): Joe Buck, Troy Aikman, Erin Andrews and Chris Myers
- Recap, Game Book

Scoring summary

Quarter	Time	Drive			Team	Scoring information	Score	
Quarter	Time	Plays	Yards	TOP	Team	Scoring information	NE	ATL
2	12:15	5	71	1:53	ATL	Devonta Freeman 5-yard touchdown run, Matt Bryant kick good	0	7
2	8:48	5	62	1:49	ATL	Austin Hooper 19-yard touchdown reception from Matt Ryan, Bryant kick good	0	14
2	2:21	—	—	—	ATL	Interception returned 82 yards for touchdown by Robert Alford, Bryant kick good	0	21
2	0:02	11	52	2:19	NE	41-yard field goal by Stephen Gostkowski	3	21
3	8:31	8	85	4:14	ATL	Tevin Coleman 6-yard touchdown reception from Ryan, Bryant kick good	3	28
3	2:06	13	75	6:25	NE	James White 5-yard touchdown reception from Tom Brady, Gostkowski kick no good (hit right upright)	9	28
4	9:44	12	72	5:07	NE	33-yard field goal by Gostkowski	12	28
4	5:56	5	25	2:28	NE	Danny Amendola 6-yard touchdown reception from Brady, 2-point run good (White run)	20	28
4	0:57	10	91	2:33	NE	White 1-yard touchdown run, 2-point pass good (Brady–Amendola pass)	28	28
OT	11:02	8	75	3:58	NE	White 2-yard touchdown run	34	28
"TOP" = time of possession. For other American football terms, see Glossary of American football.							34	28

== Final statistics ==
=== Statistical comparison ===
Statistic	New England Patriots	Atlanta Falcons
First downs	37	17
First downs rushing	7	3
First downs passing	26	13
First downs penalty	4	1
Third down efficiency	7/14	1/8
Fourth down efficiency	1/1	0/0
Total net yards	546	344
Net yards rushing	104	104
Rushing attempts	25	18
Yards per rush	4.2	5.8
Net yards passing	442	240
Passing – completions/attempts	43/63	17/23
Times sacked-total yards	5–24	5–44
Interceptions thrown	1	0
Punt returns-total yards	4–39	1–0
Kickoff returns-total yards	1–20	5–42
Interceptions-total return yards	0–0	1–82
Punts-average yardage	4–41.5	6–47.0
Fumbles-lost	1–1	1–1
Penalties-yards	4–23	9–65
Time of possession	40:31	23:27
Turnovers	2	1

Records set
Most Super Bowl appearances, as team	9	New England Patriots
Most pass attempts, team (game)	63	New England Patriots
Most pass completions, team (game)	43	New England Patriots
Most passing yards, team (game)	442	New England Patriots
Most first downs, team (game)	37	New England Patriots
Most first downs via pass, team (game)	26	New England Patriots
Most offensive plays, team (game)	93	New England Patriots
Most points in overtime, team (game)	6	New England Patriots
Largest deficit overcome, winning team	25 points	New England Patriots
Largest deficit overcome after third quarter, winning team	19 points	New England Patriots
Largest deficit overcome after second quarter, winning team	18 points	New England Patriots
Least playing time in lead, winning team	0:00	New England Patriots
Most Super Bowl appearances, as player	7	Tom Brady (New England)
Most Super Bowl appearances, as starting player	7	Tom Brady (New England)
Most Super Bowl championships won, as quarterback	5	Tom Brady (New England)
Most Super Bowl MVP awards	4	Tom Brady (New England)
Most pass attempts, player (career)	309	Tom Brady (New England)
Most pass attempts, player (game)	62	Tom Brady (New England)
Most pass completions, player (career)	207	Tom Brady (New England)
Most pass completions, player (game)	43	Tom Brady (New England)
Most passing yards, player (career)	2,071	Tom Brady (New England)
Most passing yards, player (game)	466	Tom Brady (New England)
Most touchdown passes, player (career)	15	Tom Brady (New England)
Oldest starting quarterback	39 years, 186 days	Tom Brady (New England)
Most Super Bowl appearances, as head coach	7	Bill Belichick (New England)
Most Super Bowl appearances, as coach	10	Bill Belichick (New England)
Most Super Bowl appearances, in any capacity	10	Bill Belichick (New England)
Most Super Bowls won, as head coach	5	Bill Belichick (New England)
Most pass receptions, player (game)	14	James White (New England)
Most points scored, player (game)	20	James White (New England)
Most net passing yards, total (both teams, game)	682	New England Patriots 442, Atlanta Falcons 240
Most gross passing yards, total (both teams, game)	750	New England 466, Atlanta 284
Most first downs, total (both teams, game)	54	New England 37, Atlanta 17
Most first downs via pass, total (both teams, game)	39	New England 26, Atlanta 13
Most points in overtime, total (game)	6	New England 6, Atlanta 0
Longest playing time (game)	63:58	first overtime game in Super Bowl history
Most playing time in lead, losing team	41:18	Atlanta Falcons
Records tied
Most games won, as player	5	Tom Brady (New England)
Most touchdowns scored, player (game)	3	James White (New England)
Most sacks, player (game)	3	Grady Jarrett (Atlanta)
Most touchdowns scored, losing team (game)	4	Atlanta
Most two-point conversions scored, player (game)	1	James White (New England); Danny Amendola (New England)
Most two-point conversions scored, player (career)	1	James White (New England); Danny Amendola (New England)
Most two-point conversions scored, team (game)	2	New England
Most two-point conversions scored, total (both teams, game)	2	New England 2, Atlanta 0
Most first downs via penalty, team (game)	4	New England

=== Individual statistics ===
Sources: The Football Database Super Bowl LI

Patriots passing
	C/ATT^{1}	Yds	TD	INT	Rating
Tom Brady	43/62	466	2	1	95.2
Julian Edelman	0/1	0	0	0	39.6
Patriots rushing
	Car^{2}	Yds	TD	LG^{3}	Yds/Car
LeGarrette Blount	11	31	0	9	2.82
James White	6	29	2	10	4.83
Dion Lewis	6	27	0	13	4.50
Tom Brady	1	15	0	15	15.00
Julian Edelman	1	2	0	2	2.00
Patriots receiving
	Rec^{4}	Yds	TD	LG^{3}	Target^{5}
James White	14	110	1	28	16
Danny Amendola	8	78	1	20	11
Malcolm Mitchell	6	70	0	18	7
Julian Edelman	5	87	0	27	13
Martellus Bennett	5	62	0	25	6
Chris Hogan	4	57	0	18	7
Dion Lewis	1	2	0	2	3

Falcons passing
	C/ATT^{1}	Yds	TD	INT	Rating
Matt Ryan	17/23	284	2	0	144.1
Falcons rushing
	Car^{2}	Yds	TD	LG^{3}	Yds/Car
Devonta Freeman	11	75	1	37	6.82
Tevin Coleman	7	29	0	9	4.14
Falcons receiving
	Rec^{4}	Yds	TD	LG^{3}	Target^{5}
Julio Jones	4	87	0	27	4
Taylor Gabriel	3	76	0	35	5
Austin Hooper	3	32	1	19	6
Devonta Freeman	2	46	0	39	2
Mohamed Sanu	2	25	0	13	2
Patrick DiMarco	2	12	0	10	2
Tevin Coleman	1	6	1	6	1

^{1}Completions/attempts
^{2}Carries
^{3}Long gain
^{4}Receptions
^{5}Times targeted

== Starting lineups ==
Hall of Fame‡

New England	Position		Atlanta
Offense
Chris Hogan	WR		Julio Jones
Nate Solder	LT		Jake Matthews
Joe Thuney	LG		Andy Levitre
David Andrews	C		Alex Mack
Shaq Mason	RG		Chris Chester
Marcus Cannon	RT		Ryan Schraeder
Martellus Bennett	TE		Levine Toilolo
Julian Edelman	WR		Mohamed Sanu
Tom Brady	QB		Matt Ryan
Malcolm Mitchell	WR	RB	Devonta Freeman
Dion Lewis	RB	FB	Patrick DiMarco
Defense
Duron Harmon	DB	DE	Dwight Freeney‡
Alan Branch	DT		Ra'Shede Hageman
Malcom Brown	DT	DB	Brian Poole
Trey Flowers	RE	DE	Grady Jarrett
Shea McClellin	LB		Vic Beasley
Dont'a Hightower	LB		Deion Jones
Rob Ninkovich	LB		De'Vondre Campbell
Logan Ryan	RCB	CB	Robert Alford
Malcolm Butler	LCB	CB	Jalen Collins
Patrick Chung	S		Ricardo Allen
Devin McCourty	S		Keanu Neal

== Officials ==
Super Bowl LI had eight officials. The numbers in parentheses below indicate their uniform numbers.

- Referee: Carl Cheffers (51)
- Umpire: Dan Ferrell (64)
- Head linesman: Kent Payne (79)
- Line judge: Jeff Seeman (45)
- Field judge: Doug Rosenbaum (67)
- Side judge: Dyrol Prioleau (109)
- Back judge: Todd Prukop (30)
- Replay official: Tom Sifferman

== Film depiction ==
The 2023 film 80 for Brady depicts the game, while providing a fictional account of surrounding events. In the film, four elderly women who are Tom Brady fans attend the game, and in the course of various hijinks, one of them (played by Lily Tomlin) gets into the Patriots coordinators' booth and gives Brady a pep talk that inspires him to turn around the team's halftime deficit and win the game.
