= Hammond High Magnet School =

High school on Hammond, Louisiana, US

Location
- 45168 River Road; Hammond, Tangipahoa Parish, Louisiana 70401; United States; 30.517276°N 90.380535°W

Information
- Type: Public high school
- Established: 1866 (159 years ago)
- School district: Tangipahoa Parish School Board
- Principal: Michael Kyles, Jr.
- Staff: 88.16 (FTE)
- Enrollment: 1,592 (2021–22)
- Student to teacher ratio: 18.06
- Colors: Purple and white
- Athletics conference: District 6-5A
- Mascot: Tornado
- Nickname: Tors
- Rival: Ponchatoula High School
- Newspaper: Tornado Times News
- Yearbook: Tornado Trail
- Website: hhms.tangischools.org

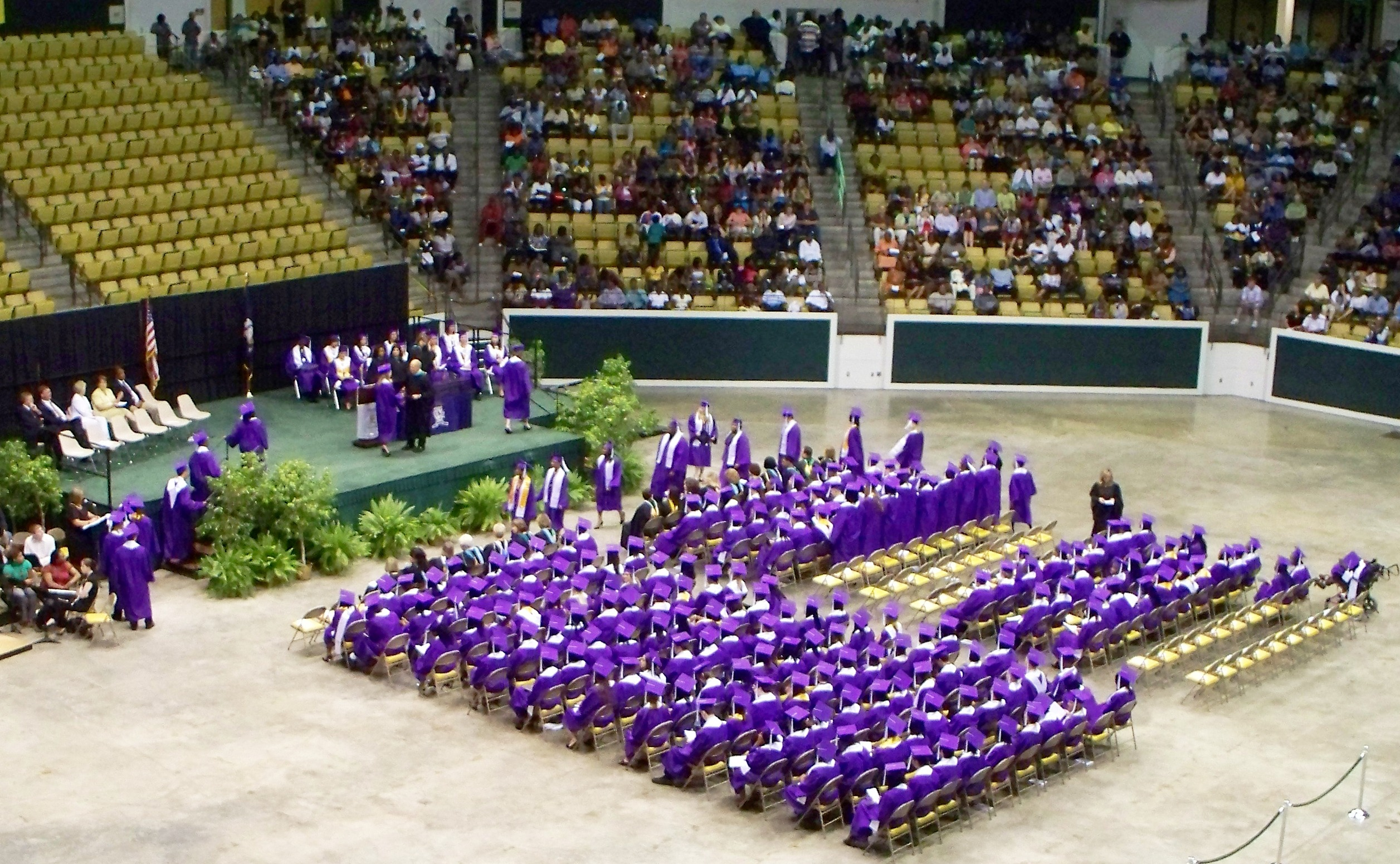
Hammond High's Class of 2009 graduation ceremony

Hammond High Magnet School is a public high school located in an unincorporated part of the 7th Ward of Tangipahoa Parish, Louisiana, United States, east of Hammond. It is the second-largest high school in the Tangipahoa Parish Public School System. Until the end of academic year 2010–11, it was known as Hammond High School but became Hammond Magnet High School on being so reconstituted and designated by the Tangipahoa Parish School System.

The mascot is the Tornado, and the school colors are purple and white. The principal is Micheal Kyles, Jr. The school enrolls students from Hammond and the surrounding area within Tangipahoa Parish because of the presence of the Magnet program and International Baccalaureate program.

== History ==
Founded in 1866, and originally located between East Thomas Street (US 190, then a two-way road) and Morris Street (the building became Eastside Elementary School and later the Eastside Apartments), the school moved to a location on the south side of West Morris Street (US 190, now eastbound only) shortly after World War I; the West Morris Street site is now the world headquarters of Neill Corporation. In the Morris Street location, although the vernacular name was Hammond High School, officially, it was "Annie Eastman High School" in commemoration of a former teacher. In the late 1960s, the school relocated to a site north of University Avenue (LA 3234), now the North Campus of Southeastern Louisiana University. From there, Hammond High moved to its current location on LA 1064 (River Road).

Linus A. Sims was appointed the principal of Hammond High School in 1923. Two years later, he started Hammond Junior College in a wing of the high school, then on the south side of West Morris Street. In 1928, the junior college, under Sims's leadership, became the future Southeastern Louisiana University (then College).

== Athletics ==
Hammond High athletics competes in the LHSAA.

The school sponsors football, volleyball, soccer, softball, swim, tennis, and track and field. Hammond's chief rival is the Ponchatoula Green Wave.

=== Championships ===
Football championships

- (1) State Championship: 1970

== Notable alumni ==
- Robert Alford, Class of 2008, football player
- Warren Bankston, Class of 1965, football player
- Jacob Brumfield, MLB player
- Raymond M. Clausen, Jr., Class of 1965, USMC, Medal of Honor recipient
- Brad Davis, Class of 1971, football player
- John Desmond, architect, designed many of the public buildings in Baton Rouge
- Barbara Forrest, professor at Southeastern Louisiana University and opponent of Intelligent Design
- Pete Golding, Class of 2002, head coach Ole Miss Rebels football
- Kim Mulkey, Class of 1980, head coach of LSU women's basketball team, Gold Medal olympian
