= 2017 Atlanta Falcons season =

52nd season in franchise history

- Owner: Arthur Blank
- General manager: Thomas Dimitroff
- Head coach: Dan Quinn
- Offensive coordinator: Steve Sarkisian
- Defensive coordinator: Marquand Manuel
- Home stadium: Mercedes-Benz Stadium

Results
- Record: 10–6
- Division place: 3rd NFC South
- Playoffs: Won Wild Card Playoffs (at Rams) 26–13; Lost Divisional Playoffs (at Eagles) 10–15
- Pro Bowlers: WR Julio Jones; C Alex Mack; LB Deion Jones; S Keanu Neal

Uniform
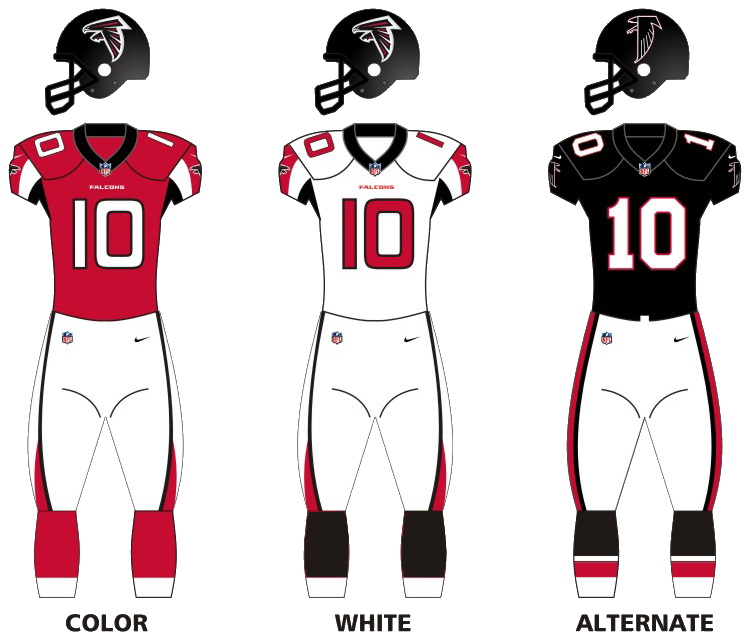

The 2017 season was the Atlanta Falcons' 52nd in the National Football League (NFL), their first playing their home games at Mercedes-Benz Stadium, and their third under head coach Dan Quinn. Atlanta entered the season as the defending NFC champions, following a historic collapse in Super Bowl LI where they surrendered a 28-3 lead and lost to the Patriots.

This was the Falcons' first year in Mercedes-Benz Stadium after spending the previous 25 seasons in the Georgia Dome, which was demolished on November 20, 2017. Mercedes-Benz Stadium opened as scheduled on August 26, 2017; however, its retractable roof system was incomplete. The roof of Mercedes-Benz Stadium remained in the closed position for most of the 2017 season, with the roof opened only during the September 17 game against the Green Bay Packers, as contractors continued to fully mechanize the roof.

On December 13, 2017, Tommy Nobis, the first player drafted by the Falcons, died at the age of 74.

Despite the Falcons failing to improve on their 11–5 record from 2016 or defend their NFC South title, the team posted its first consecutive winning seasons and consecutive playoff berths since the 2012 season. The Falcons were the only NFC team from the 2016 playoffs to qualify for the 2017 playoffs. In the playoffs, the Falcons defeated the Los Angeles Rams in the NFC Wild Card Round, but lost against the eventual Super Bowl champion Philadelphia Eagles in the NFC Divisional Round despite being the first team to be favored over a number one seed in the Divisional Round.

As of 2025, this is the most recent winning season and playoff appearance for the Falcons, and the Falcons currently hold the second-longest playoff drought, with only the New York Jets holding a longer drought, having last qualified for the playoffs in 2010.

== Offseason ==
=== Signings ===
Position	Player	Age	2016 Team	Contract
WR	Reginald Davis III	25	Atlanta Falcons	3 years, $1.66 million
DE	Jack Crawford	28	Dallas Cowboys	3 years, $8.8 million
DT	Dontari Poe	26	Kansas City Chiefs	1 year, $8 million
S	Kemal Ishmael	25	Atlanta Falcons	1 year, $2 million
WR	Andre Roberts	29	Detroit Lions	1 year, $1.8 million
LB	LaRoy Reynolds	26	Atlanta Falcons	1 year, $1.3 million
CB	Blidi Wreh-Wilson	27	Atlanta Falcons	1 year, $775,000
OG	Hugh Thornton	25	Indianapolis Colts	1 year, $690,000

== Draft ==
2017 Atlanta Falcons Draft
Round	Selection	Player	Position	College
1	26	Takkarist McKinley	DE	UCLA
3	75	Duke Riley	LB	LSU
4	136	Sean Harlow	G	Oregon State
5	149	Damontae Kazee	S	San Diego State
5	156	Brian Hill	RB	Wyoming
5	174	Eric Saubert	TE	Drake

=== Undrafted free agents ===
2017 Atlanta Falcons Undrafted Free Agents
Position	Player	College	Notes
QB	Alek Torgersen	Pennsylvania	
FB	Tyler Renew	The Citadel	
WR	Josh Magee	South Alabama	
WR	Deonte Burton	Kansas State	
C	Cam Keizur	Portland State	
T	Andreas Knappe	UConn	
T	Robert Leff	Auburn	
OL	Travis Averill	Boise State	
OL	Will Freeman	Southern Miss	
DE	J.T. Jones	Miami (OH)	
DE	Chris Odom	Arkansas State	
DE	Darius English	South Carolina	
DE	Gary Thompson Jr.	Marshall	
LB	Christian Tago	San Jose State	
LB	Jermaine Grace	Miami	
CB	Marcelis Branch	Robert Morris	
S	Deron Washington	Pittsburg State	
S	Quincy Mauger	Georgia	
CB	Taylor Reynolds	James Madison	

== Staff ==
2017 Atlanta Falcons staff
Front office: Owner/chairman – Arthur Blank; President/CEO – Rich McKay; General manager – Thomas Dimitroff; Assistant general manager – Scott Pioli; Director of pro personnel – Joel Collier; Director, football operations – Nick Polk; Director of college scouting – Steve Sabo; National scout – Ruston Webster; National scout – Phil Emery; Head coaches: Head coach – Dan Quinn; Assistant head coach/passing game coordinator/wide receivers – Raheem Morris; Assistant to the head coach – Steve Scarnecchia; Offensive coaches: Offensive coordinator – Steve Sarkisian; Quarterbacks – Bush Hamdan; Running backs – Keith Carter; Tight ends – Wade Harman; Offensive line – Chris Morgan; Assistant offensive line – Kyle Flood; Offensive assistant – Dave Brock; Offensive assistant – Justin Outten; Offensive assistant – Charlie Weis Jr.	Defensive coaches: Defensive coordinator – Marquand Manuel; Defensive line – Bryant Young; Linebackers – Jeff Ulbrich; Defensive passing game coordinator – Jerome Henderson; Defensive backs – Doug Mallory; Defensive assistant – Charlie Jackson; Defensive assistant – Jess Simpson; Special teams coaches: Special teams coordinator – Keith Armstrong; Assistant special teams – Eric Sutulovich; Strength and conditioning: Athletic performance manager – A.J. Neibel; Head strength and conditioning – Jesse Ackerman; Assistant strength and conditioning – Jonas Beauchemin

== Final roster ==
2017 Atlanta Falcons roster
Quarterbacks (QB): 2 Matt Ryan; 8 Matt Schaub; Running backs (RB): 40 Derrick Coleman FB; 26 Tevin Coleman; 24 Devonta Freeman; 28 Terron Ward; Wide receivers (WR): 18 Taylor Gabriel; 17 Marvin Hall; 14 Justin Hardy; 11 Julio Jones; 19 Andre Roberts; 12 Mohamed Sanu; 15 Nick Williams; Tight ends (TE): 81 Austin Hooper; 85 Eric Saubert; 80 Levine Toilolo	Offensive linemen (OL): 75 Jamil Douglas G; 63 Ben Garland G; 64 Sean Harlow C; 67 Andy Levitre G; 51 Alex Mack C; 70 Jake Matthews T; 68 Austin Pasztor T; 74 Ty Sambrailo T; 73 Ryan Schraeder T; 71 Wes Schweitzer G; Defensive linemen (DL): 99 Adrian Clayborn DE; 97 Grady Jarrett DT; 98 Takkarist McKinley DE; 92 Dontari Poe DT; 50 Brooks Reed DE; 90 Derrick Shelby DE; 79 Ahtyba Rubin DT; 91 Courtney Upshaw DE	Linebackers (LB): 44 Vic Beasley OLB; 59 De'Vondre Campbell OLB; 36 Kemal Ishmael OLB; 45 Deion Jones MLB; 53 LaRoy Reynolds MLB; 42 Duke Riley OLB; 56 Sean Weatherspoon OLB; Defensive backs (DB): 23 Robert Alford CB; 37 Ricardo Allen FS; 27 Damontae Kazee FS; 35 Leon McFadden CB; 22 Keanu Neal SS; 20 Sharrod Neasman SS; 34 Brian Poole CB; 21 Desmond Trufant CB; 33 Blidi Wreh-Wilson CB; Special teams (ST): 5 Matt Bosher P; 3 Matt Bryant K; 47 Josh Harris LS	Practice squad: 35 Marcelis Branch FS; 76 Daniel Brunskill G; 39 Deante Burton CB; 16 Reggie Davis WR; 89 Alex Gray TE (IPP); 9 Garrett Grayson QB; 77 Joey Ivie DT; 55 J. T. Jones OLB; -- Trevor Knight QB (IR); 82 Joshua Perkins TE (IR); 25 Terrence Magee RB; 93 Tani Tupou DT; Reserve: 95 Jack Crawford DT (IR); 13 Devin Fuller WR (IR); 96 Martin Ifedi DE (IR); 41 Quincy Mauger SS (IR); 52 Jordan Tripp MLB (IR); Rookies in italics 53 active, 7 reserve, 10 practice squad

== Preseason ==
Week	Date	Opponent	Result	Record	Venue	Recap
1	August 10	at Miami Dolphins	L 20–23	0–1	Hard Rock Stadium	Recap
2	August 20	at Pittsburgh Steelers	L 13–17	0–2	Heinz Field	Recap
3	August 26	Arizona Cardinals	L 14–24	0–3	Mercedes-Benz Stadium	Recap
4	August 31	Jacksonville Jaguars	L 7–13	0–4	Mercedes-Benz Stadium	Recap

== Regular season ==
=== Schedule ===
Week	Date	Opponent	Result	Record	Venue	Attendance	Recap
1	September 10	at Chicago Bears	**W** 23–17	1–0	Soldier Field	61,857	Recap
2	September 17	Green Bay Packers	**W** 34–23	2–0	Mercedes-Benz Stadium	70,826	Recap
3	September 24	at Detroit Lions	**W** 30–26	3–0	Ford Field	63,240	Recap
4	October 1	Buffalo Bills	**L** 17–23	3–1	Mercedes-Benz Stadium	71,273	Recap
5	Bye						
6	October 15	Miami Dolphins	**L** 17–20	3–2	Mercedes-Benz Stadium	70,593	Recap
7	October 22	at New England Patriots	**L** 7–23	3–3	Gillette Stadium	65,878	Recap
8	October 29	at New York Jets	**W** 25–20	4–3	MetLife Stadium	77,562	Recap
9	November 5	at **Carolina Panthers**	**L** 17–20	4–4	Bank of America Stadium	74,244	Recap
10	November 12	Dallas Cowboys	**W** 27–7	5–4	Mercedes-Benz Stadium	73,761	Recap
11	November 20	at Seattle Seahawks	**W** 34–31	6–4	CenturyLink Field	69,026	Recap
12	November 26	**Tampa Bay Buccaneers**	**W** 34–20	7–4	Mercedes-Benz Stadium	71,036	Recap
13	December 3	Minnesota Vikings	**L** 9–14	7–5	Mercedes-Benz Stadium	71,185	Recap
14	December 7	**New Orleans Saints**	**W** 20–17	8–5	Mercedes-Benz Stadium	72,866	Recap
15	December 18	at **Tampa Bay Buccaneers**	**W** 24–21	9–5	Raymond James Stadium	62,382	Recap
16	December 24	at **New Orleans Saints**	**L** 13–23	9–6	Mercedes-Benz Superdome	73,188	Recap
17	December 31	**Carolina Panthers**	**W** 22–10	10–6	Mercedes-Benz Stadium	74,141	Recap

Note: Intra-division opponents are in bold text.

=== Game summaries ===
==== Week 1: at Chicago Bears ====
Week 1: Atlanta Falcons at Chicago Bears – Game summary

Quarter	1	2	3	4	Total
**Falcons**	3	7	3	10	**23**
Bears	0	10	0	7	**17**

at Soldier Field, Chicago, Illinois

- Date: September 10
- Game time: 1:00 p.m. EDT/12:00 p.m. CDT
- Game weather: 64 °F (18 °C), sunny
- Game attendance: 61,857
- Referee: Jeff Triplette
- TV announcers (Fox): Kevin Burkhardt, Charles Davis, and Pam Oliver
- Recap, Gamebook

Game information

**First quarter**

- ATL – Matt Bryant 48-yard field goal, 8:01. Falcons 3–0. **Drive: 11 plays, 62 yards, 7:04.**

**Second quarter**

- CHI – Connor Barth 54-yard field goal, 15:00. Tied 3–3. **Drive: 10 plays, 41 yards, 4:24.**
- ATL – Devonta Freeman 5-yard run (Matt Bryant kick), 4:34. Falcons 10–3. **Drive: 11 plays, 83 yards, 6:59.**
- CHI – Jordan Howard 4-yard run (Connor Barth kick), 0:20. Tied 10–10. **Drive: 7 plays, 75 yards, 4:15.**

**Third quarter**

- ATL – Matt Bryant 28-yard field goal, 2:15. Falcons 13–10. **Drive: 13 plays, 76 yards, 6:29.**

**Fourth quarter**

- ATL – Austin Hooper 88-yard pass from Matt Ryan (Matt Bryant kick), 12:10. Falcons 20–10. **Drive: 3 plays, 95 yards, 0:59.**
- CHI – Tarik Cohen 19-yard pass from Mike Glennon (Connor Barth kick), 7:33. Falcons 20–17. **Drive: 9 plays, 75 yards, 4:29.**
- ATL – Matt Bryant 37-yard field goal, 3:29. Falcons 23–17. **Drive: 9 plays, 56 yards, 4:02.**

**Top passers**

- ATL – Matt Ryan – 21/30, 321 yards, TD
- CHI – Mike Glennon – 26/40, 213 yards, TD

**Top rushers**

- ATL – Devonta Freeman – 12 rushes, 37 yards, TD
- CHI – Tarik Cohen – 5 rushes, 66 yards

**Top receivers**

- ATL – Austin Hooper – 2 receptions, 128 yards, TD
- CHI – Tarik Cohen – 8 receptions, 47 yards, TD

==== Week 2: vs. Green Bay Packers ====
Week 2: Green Bay Packers at Atlanta Falcons – Game summary

Quarter	1	2	3	4	Total
Packers	7	0	3	13	**23**
**Falcons**	7	17	10	0	**34**

at Mercedes-Benz Stadium, Atlanta, Georgia

- Date: September 17
- Game time: 8:30 p.m. EDT
- Game weather: 78 °F (26 °C), clear — retractable roof open
- Game attendance: 70,826
- Referee: Walt Anderson
- TV announcers (NBC): Al Michaels, Cris Collinsworth, and Michele Tafoya
- Recap, Gamebook

Game information

**First quarter**

- ATL – Devonta Freeman 1-yard run (Matt Bryant kick), 9:55. Falcons 7–0. **Drive: 7 plays, 86 yards, 5:09.**
- GB – Ty Montgomery 1-yard run (Mason Crosby kick), 3:47. Tied 7–7. **Drive: 11 plays, 75 yards, 6:08.**

**Second quarter**

- ATL – Devonta Freeman 2-yard run (Matt Bryant kick), 11:14. Falcons 14–7. **Drive: 10 plays, 87 yards, 4:12.**
- ATL – Matt Bryant 51-yard field goal, 3:27. Falcons 17–7. **Drive: 7 plays, 58 yards, 3:53.**
- ATL – Tevin Coleman 3-yard pass from Matt Ryan (Matt Bryant kick), 0:24. Falcons 24–7. **Drive: 4 plays, 36 yards, 0:28.**

**Third quarter**

- ATL – Desmond Trufant fumble recovery 15-yard run, 14:17. Falcons 31–7.
- GB – Mason Crosby 28-yard field goal, 9:37. Falcons 31–10. **Drive: 11 plays, 65 yards, 4:31.**
- ATL – Matt Bryant 53-yard field goal, 4:25. Falcons 34–10. **Drive: 10 plays, 40 yards, 5:14.**

**Fourth quarter**

- GB – Davante Adams 33-yard pass from Aaron Rodgers, 12:50. Falcons 34–16. **Drive: 13 plays, 75 yards, 6:37.**
- GB – Ty Montgomery 1-yard pass from Aaron Rodgers (Mason Crosby kick), 5:54. Falcons 34–23. **Drive: 8 plays, 85 yards, 3:44.**

**Top passers**

- GB – Aaron Rodgers – 33/50, 343 yards, 2 TD, INT
- ATL – Matt Ryan – 19/28, 252 yards, TD

**Top rushers**

- GB – Ty Montgomery – 10 rushes, 35 yards, TD
- ATL – Devonta Freeman – 19 rushes, 84 yards, 2 TD

**Top receivers**

- GB – Davante Adams – 8 receptions, 99 yards, TD
- ATL – Julio Jones – 5 receptions, 108 yards

In their home opener, the Falcons hosted the Green Bay Packers in a rematch of the 2016 NFC Championship Game. This was the first regular season game at Mercedes-Benz Stadium. Despite prior reports that the roof would be closed for the game, Falcons owner Arthur Blank elected to open the roof if weather permitted, marking the first time since the 1991 season, the team's final season at their original home of Atlanta–Fulton County Stadium, that the Falcons played a home game in Atlanta under open air. The Falcons controlled most of the game, went up by as much as 24, and won 34–23. They were led by Devonta Freeman (19 rushes, 84 yards, 2 TD) and Julio Jones (108 yards, 5 receptions). The 2017 Falcons became only the fourth team in NFL history to start 2–0 after they lost the Super Bowl the previous year.

==== Week 3: at Detroit Lions ====
Week 3: Atlanta Falcons at Detroit Lions – Game summary

Quarter	1	2	3	4	Total
**Falcons**	7	13	3	7	**30**
Lions	0	13	10	3	**26**

at Ford Field, Detroit Michigan

- Date: September 24
- Game time: 1:00 p.m. EDT
- Game weather: Played indoors (dome stadium)
- Game attendance: 63,240
- Referee: Walt Coleman
- TV announcers (Fox): Chris Myers, Daryl Johnston, and Laura Okmin
- Recap, Gamebook

Game information

**First quarter**

- ATL – Mohamed Sanu pass from Matt Ryan for 4 yards. (Matt Bryant kick). Falcons 7–0. **Drive: 12 plays, 75 yards, 6:43/**

**Second quarter**

- ATL – Matt Bryant 36 yard field goal. Falcons 10–0. **Drive: 10 plays, 53 yards, 5:36.**
- DET – Matt Prater 55 yard field goal. Falcons 10–3. **Drive: 6 plays, 38 yards, 2:24.**
- ATL – Devonta Freeman 1 yard rush. (Matt Bryant kick). Falcons 17–3. **Drive: 9 plays, 64 yards, 5:27.**
- DET – Matt Prater 40 yard field goal. Falcons 17–6. **Drive: 9 plays, 53 yards, 3:10.**
- DET – Glover Quin 37 yard interception return. (Matt Prater kick). Falcons 17–13. **Drive: 1 play, 0 yards, 0:09.**
- ATL – Matt Bryant 48 yard field goal. Falcons 20–13. **Drive: 7 plays, 45 yards, 1:10.**

**Third quarter**

- ATL – Matt Bryant 40 yard field goal. Falcons 23–13. **Drive: 5 plays, 19 yards, 1:55.**
- DET – Golden Tate pass from Matthew Stafford for 11 yards. (Matt Prater kick). Falcons 23–20. **Drive: 12 plays, 75 yards, 6:46.**
- DET – Matt Prater 35 yard field goal. Tied 23–23. **Drive: 4 plays, 4 yards, 1:20.**

**Fourth quarter**

- ATL – Taylor Gabriel pass from Matt Ryan for 40 yards. (Matt Bryant kick). Falcons 30–23. **Drive: 4 plays, 75 yards, 1:34.**
- DET – Matt Prater 57 yard field goal. Falcons 30–26. **Drive: 8 plays, 37 yards, 3:02.**

**Top passers**

- ATL – Matt Ryan – 24/35, 294 yards, 2 TD, 3 INT
- DET – Matthew Stafford – 25/45, 264 yards, TD

**Top rushers**

- ATL – Devonta Freeman – 21 rushes, 106 yards, TD
- DET – Ameer Abdullah – 14 rushes, 47 yards.

**Top receivers**

- ATL – Julio Jones – 7 receptions, 91 yards
- DET – T. J. Jones – 3 receptions, 63 yards

==== Week 4: vs. Buffalo Bills ====
Week 4: Buffalo Bills at Atlanta Falcons – Game summary

Quarter	1	2	3	4	Total
**Bills**	0	7	7	9	**23**
Falcons	0	10	0	7	**17**

at Mercedes-Benz Stadium, Atlanta, Georgia

- Date: October 1
- Game time: 1:00 p.m. EDT
- Game weather: Played indoors (retractable roof closed)
- Game attendance: 71,273
- Referee: Terry McAulay
- TV announcers (CBS): Greg Gumbel, Trent Green, and Jamie Erdahl
- Recap, Gamebook

Game information

**First quarter**

- No scoring plays

**Second quarter**

- Matt Bryant 28–yard field goal, 10:31. Falcons 3–0. **Drive: 6 plays, 44 yards, 3:55.**
- Jordan Matthews 9–yard pass from Tyrod Taylor, 6:51 (Stephen Hauschka kick). Bills 7–3. **Drive: 8 plays, 77 yards, 3:40.**
- Devonta Freeman 1–yard run, 0:18 (Matt Bryant kick). Falcons 10–3. **Drive: 9 plays, 78 yards, 3:02.**

**Third quarter**

- Tre'Davious White 52 yard fumble return, 10:55 (Stephen Hauschka kick). Bills 14–10.

**Fourth quarter**

- Stephen Hauschka 24–yard field goal, 12:00. Bills 17–10. **Drive: 19 plays, 82 yards, 11:20.**
- Justin Hardy 3–yard pass from Matt Ryan, 7:00 (Matt Bryant kick). Tied 17–17. **Drive: 10 plays, 77 yards, 5:00.**
- Stephen Hauschka 56–yard field goal, 4:44. Bills 20–17. **Drive: 5 plays, 37 yards, 2:16.**
- Stephen Hauschka 55–yard field goal, 3:06. Bills 23–17. **Drive: 4 plays, −2 yards, 0:21.**

**Top passers**

- BUF – Tyrod Taylor – 12/20, 182 yards, TD
- ATL – Matt Ryan – 24/42, 242 yards, TD, 2 INT

**Top rushers**

- BUF – LeSean McCoy – 20 rushes, 76 yards
- ATL – Tevin Coleman – 9 rushes, 77 yards

**Top receivers**

- BUF – Charles Clay – 5 receptions, 112 yards
- ATL – Tevin Coleman – 4 receptions, 65 yards

==== Week 6: vs. Miami Dolphins ====
Week 6: Miami Dolphins at Atlanta Falcons – Game summary

Quarter	1	2	3	4	Total
**Dolphins**	0	0	14	6	**20**
Falcons	10	7	0	0	**17**

at Mercedes-Benz Stadium, Atlanta, Georgia

- Date: October 15
- Game time: 1:00 p.m. EDT
- Game weather: Played indoors (retractable roof closed)
- Game attendance: 70,593
- Referee: John Hussey
- TV announcers (CBS): Greg Gumbel, Trent Green, and Jamie Erdahl
- Recap, Gamebook

Game information

**First quarter**

- ATL – Matt Bryant 50-yard field goal, 9:41. Falcons 3–0. **Drive: 11 plays, 43 yards, 5:19.**
- ATL – Marvin Hall 40-yard pass from Matt Ryan (Matt Bryant kick), 1:51. Falcons 10–0. **Drive: 9 plays, 90 yards, 4:49.**

**Second quarter**

- ATL – Tevin Coleman 6-yard run (Matt Bryant kick), 5:29. Falcons 17–0. **Drive: 5 plays, 61 yards, 2:23**

**Third quarter**

- MIA – Kenny Stills 11-yard pass from Jay Cutler (Cody Parkey kick), 6:17. Falcons 17–7. **Drive: 15 plays, 75 yards, 8:43.**
- MIA – Jarvis Landry 7-yard pass from Jay Cutler (Cody Parkey kick), 1:32. Falcons 17–14. **Drive: 5 plays, 51 yards, 2:30.**

**Fourth quarter**

- MIA – Cody Parkey 49-yard field goal, 8:43. Tied 17–17. **Drive: 8 plays, 21 yards, 3:08.**
- MIA – Cody Parkey 38-yard field goal, 2:30. Dolphins 20–17. **Drive: 10 plays, 46 yards, 4:30.**

**Top passers**

- MIA – Jay Cutler – 19/33, 151 yards, 2 TD, INT
- ATL – Matt Ryan – 24/35, 248 yards, TD, INT

**Top rushers**

- MIA – Jay Ajayi – 26 rushes, 130 yards
- ATL – Devonta Freeman – 9 rushes, 68 yards

**Top receivers**

- MIA – Jarvis Landry – 8 receptions, 62 yards, TD
- ATL – Austin Hooper – 7 receptions, 48 yards

==== Week 7: at New England Patriots ====
Week 7: Atlanta Falcons at New England Patriots – Game summary

Quarter	1	2	3	4	Total
Falcons	0	0	0	7	**7**
**Patriots**	0	17	3	3	**23**

at Gillette Stadium, Foxborough, Massachusetts

- Date: October 22
- Game time: 8:30 p.m. EDT
- Game weather: 56 °F (13 °C), cloudy, fog started developing in 2nd quarter
- Game attendance: 65,878
- Referee: Gene Steratore
- TV announcers (NBC): Al Michaels, Cris Collinsworth, and Michele Tafoya
- Recap, Gamebook

Game information

**First quarter**

- No scoring plays.

**Second quarter**

- NE – Brandin Cooks 11-yard pass from Tom Brady (Stephen Gostkowski kick), 12:26. Patriots 7–0. **Drive: 7 plays, 74 yards, 3:39.**
- NE – Stephen Gostkowski 29-yard field goal, 4:42. Patriots 10–0. **Drive: 14 plays, 64 yard, 6:37.**
- NE – James White 2-yard pass from Tom Brady (Stephen Gostkowski kick), 0:21. Patriots 17–0. **Drive: 7 plays, 53 yards, 1:34.**

**Third quarter**

- NE – Stephen Gostkowski 21-yard field goal, 4:12. Patriots 20–0. **Drive: 13 plays, 71 yards,6:23.**

**Fourth quarter**

- NE – Stephen Gostkowski 38-yard field goal, 9:15. Patriots 23–0. **Drive: 10 plays, 74 yards, 5:17.**
- ATL – Julio Jones 1-yard pass from Matt Ryan (Matt Bryant kick), 4:09. Patriots 23–7. **Drive: 11 plays, 88 yards, 5:06.**

**Top passers**

- ATL – Matt Ryan – 23/33, 233 yards, TD
- NE – Tom Brady – 21/29, 249 yards, 2 TD

**Top rushers**

- ATL – Devonta Freeman – 12 rushes, 72 yards
- NE – Dion Lewis – 13 rushes, 76 yards

**Top receivers**

- ATL – Julio Jones – 9 receptions, 99 yards, TD
- NE – Chris Hogan – 4 receptions, 71 yards

In a rematch of Super Bowl LI eight months later, the Falcons were trying to avenge their historic defeat, where they blew a 28-3 lead and lost in overtime, however Atlanta lost the rematch 23-7, in a game dominated by fog in the Foxboro area in the second half. This marked the Falcons's 6th loss to the Patriots since 2001.

==== Week 8: at New York Jets ====
Week 8: Atlanta Falcons at New York Jets – Game summary

Quarter	1	2	3	4	Total
**Falcons**	7	6	3	9	**25**
Jets	7	10	0	3	**20**

at MetLife Stadium, East Rutherford, New Jersey

- Date: October 29
- Game time: 1:00 p.m. EDT
- Game weather: 63 °F (17 °C), rain
- Game attendance: 77,562
- Referee: Craig Wrolstad
- TV announcers (Fox): Sam Rosen, Ronde Barber, and Kristina Pink
- Recap, Gamebook

Game information

**First quarter**

- NYJ – Eric Tomlinson 20-yard pass from Josh McCown (Chandler Catanzaro kick), 10:33. Jets 7–0. **Drive: 8 plays, 75 yards, 4:27.**
- ATL – Austin Hooper 1-yard pass from Matt Ryan (Matt Bryant kick), 5:03. Tied 7–7. **Drive: 7 plays, 64 yards, 3:13.**

**Second quarter**

- NYJ – Chandler Catanzaro 43-yard field goal, 14:03. Jets 10–7. **Drive: 4 plays, 15 yards, 1:10.**
- ATL – Matt Bryant 23-yard field goal, 8:06. Tied 10–10. **Drive: 12 plays, 70 yards, 5:57.**
- NYJ – Robby Anderson 24-yard pass from Josh McCown (Chandler Catanzaro kick), 2:26. Jets 17–10. **Drive: 5 plays, 43 yards, 2:37.**
- ATL – Matt Bryant 45-yard field goal, 0:00. Jets 17–13. **Drive: 10 plays, 53 yards, 2:26.**

**Third quarter**

- ATL – Matt Bryant 37-yard field goal, 5:12. Jets 17–16. **Drive: 5 plays, 61 yards, 2:04.**

**Fourth quarter**

- ATL – Mohamed Sanu 8-yard pass from Matt Ryan (run failed), 12:22. Falcons 22–17. **Drive: 4 plays, 62 yards, 1:55.**
- NYJ – Chandler Catanzaro 46-yard field goal, 8:42. Falcons 22–20. **Drive: 7 plays, 52 yards, 3:40.**
- ATL – Matt Bryant 29-yard field goal, 5:19. Falcons 25–20. **Drive: 4 plays, 2 yards, 1:23.**

**Top passers**

- ATL – Matt Ryan – 18/29, 254 yards, 2 TD
- NYJ – Josh McCown – 26/33, 257 yards, 2 TD

**Top rushers**

- ATL – Tevin Coleman – 14 rushes, 82 yards
- NYJ – Bilal Powell – 14 rushes, 33 yards

**Top receivers**

- ATL – Mohamed Sanu – 6 receptions, 74 yards, TD
- NYJ – Robby Anderson – 6 receptions, 104 yards, TD

==== Week 9: at Carolina Panthers ====
Week 9: Atlanta Falcons at Carolina Panthers – Game summary

Quarter	1	2	3	4	Total
Falcons	10	0	0	7	**17**
**Panthers**	0	14	6	0	**20**

at Bank of America Stadium, Charlotte, North Carolina

- Date: November 5
- Game time: 1:00 p.m. EST
- Game weather: 61 °F (16 °C), cloudy
- Game attendance: 74,244
- Referee: Tony Corrente
- TV announcers (Fox): Joe Buck, Troy Aikman, Erin Andrews, and Mike Pereira
- Recap, Gamebook

Game information

**First quarter**

- ATL – Matt Bryant 53-yard field goal, 12:16. Falcons 3–0. **Drive: 5 plays, 40 yards, 2:44.**
- ATL – Mohamed Sanu 6-yard pass from Matt Ryan (Matt Bryant kick), 3:30. Falcons 10–0. **Drive: 8 plays, 61 yards, 4:38.**

**Second quarter**

- CAR – Christian McCaffrey 4-yard run (Graham Gano kick), 1:55. Falcons 10–7. **Drive: 6 plays, 50 yards, 2:35.**
- CAR – Cam Newton 9-yard run (Graham Gano kick), 0:23. Panthers 14–10. **Drive: 4 plays, 31 yards, 0:52.**

**Third quarter**

- CAR – Graham Gano 31-yard field goal, 9:03. Panthers 17–10. **Drive: 10 plays, 62 yards, 5:57.**
- CAR – Graham Gano 45-yard field goal, 1:38. Panthers 20–10. **Drive: 9 plays, 45 yards, 5:48.**

**Fourth quarter**

- ATL – Tevin Coleman 19-yard pass from Matt Ryan (Matt Bryant kick), 3:25. Panthers 20–17. **Drive: 7 plays, 92 yards, 2:01.**

**Top passers**

- ATL – Matt Ryan – 24/38, 313 yards, 2 TD, INT
- CAR – Cam Newton – 13/24, 137 yards

**Top rushers**

- ATL – Devonta Freeman – 11 rushes, 46 yards
- CAR – Cam Newton – 9 rushes, 86 yards, TD

**Top receivers**

- ATL – Julio Jones – 6 receptions, 118 yards
- CAR – Devin Funchess – 5 receptions, 86 yards

==== Week 10: vs. Dallas Cowboys ====
Week 10: Dallas Cowboys at Atlanta Falcons – Game summary

Quarter	1	2	3	4	Total
Cowboys	7	0	0	0	**7**
**Falcons**	3	7	7	10	**27**

at Mercedes-Benz Stadium, Atlanta, Georgia

- Date: November 12
- Game time: 4:25 p.m. EST
- Game weather: Played indoors (retractable roof closed)
- Game attendance: 73,761
- Referee: Ed Hochuli
- TV announcers (Fox): Joe Buck, Troy Aikman, Erin Andrews, and Mike Pereira
- Recap, Gamebook

Game information

**First quarter**

- DAL – Dak Prescott 11-yard run (Mike Nugent kick), 6:19. Cowboys 7–0. **Drive: 4 plays, 21 yards, 1:30.**
- ATL – Matt Bryant 50-yard field goal, 0:00. Cowboys 7–3. **Drive: 11 plays, 45 yards, 6:19.**

**Second quarter**

- ATL – Tevin Coleman 1-yard run (Matt Bryant kick), 1:31. Falcons 10–7. **Drive: 9 plays, 80 yards, 3:25.**

**Third quarter**

- ATL – Justin Hardy 3-yard pass from Matt Ryan (Matt Bryant kick), 8:26. Falcons 17–7. **Drive: 11 plays, 75 yards, 6:34.**

**Fourth quarter**

- ATL – Austin Hooper 1-yard pass from Matt Ryan (Matt Bryant kick), 13:48. Falcons 24–7. **Drive: 7 plays, 72 yards, 3:41.**
- ATL – Matt Bryant 29-yard field goal, 8:28. Falcons 27–7. **Drive: 8 plays, 46 yards, 3:55.**

**Top passers**

- DAL – Dak Prescott – 20/30, 176 yards
- ATL – Matt Ryan – 22/29, 215 yards, 2 TD, INT

**Top rushers**

- DAL – Alfred Morris – 11 rushes, 53 yards
- ATL – Tevin Coleman – 20 rushes, 83 yards, TD

**Top receivers**

- DAL – Jason Witten – 7 receptions, 59 yards
- ATL – Julio Jones – 6 receptions, 57 yards

In the Falcons' victory, Adrian Clayborn set a new franchise record of six sacks in one game, breaking the previous record of five sacks.

==== Week 11: at Seattle Seahawks ====
Week 11: Atlanta Falcons at Seattle Seahawks – Game summary

Quarter	1	2	3	4	Total
**Falcons**	14	10	7	3	**34**
Seahawks	7	10	6	8	**31**

at CenturyLink Field, Seattle, Washington

- Date: November 20
- Game time: 8:30 p.m. EST/5:30 p.m. PST
- Game weather: 45 °F (7 °C), cloudy
- Game attendance: 69,026
- Referee: Carl Cheffers
- TV announcers (ESPN): Sean McDonough, Jon Gruden, and Lisa Salters
- Recap, Gamebook

Game information

**First quarter**

- ATL – Tevin Coleman 1-yard run (Matt Bryant kick), 11:59. Falcons 7–0. **Drive: 7 plays, 52 yards, 3:01.**
- ATL – Mohamed Sanu 2-yard pass from Matt Ryan (Matt Bryant kick), 7:52. Falcons 14–0. **Drive: 7 plays, 35 yards, 3:11.**
- SEA – Jimmy Graham 4-yard pass from Russell Wilson (Blair Walsh kick), 2:55. Falcons 14–7. **Drive: 9 plays, 65 yards, 4:57.**

**Second quarter**

- ATL – Adrian Clayborn 10-yard fumble return (Matt Bryant kick), . Falcons 21–7.
- SEA – Blair Walsh 30-yard field goal, 8:11. Falcons 21–10. **Drive: 11 plays, 49 yards, 5:53.**
- SEA – Russell Wilson 1-yard run (Blair Walsh kick), 5:21. Falcons 21–17. **Drive: 7 plays, 11 yards, 2:50.**
- ATL – Matt Bryant 44-yard field goal, 1:06. Falcons 24–17. **Drive: 9 plays, 45 yards, 4:15.**

**Third quarter**

- SEA – Blair Walsh 37-yard field goal, 11:21. Falcons 24–20. **Drive: 7 plays, 53 yards, 3:39.**
- ATL – Levine Toilolo 25-yard pass from Matt Ryan (Matt Bryant kick), 7:24. Falcons 31–20. **Drive: 8 plays, 76 yards, 3:57.**
- SEA – Blair Walsh 46-yard field goal, 1:40. Falcons 31–23. **Drive: 11 plays, 47 yards, 5:44.**

**Fourth quarter**

- ATL – Matt Bryant 19-yard field goal, 3:49. Falcons 34–23. **Drive: 9 plays, 61 yards, 5:08.**
- SEA – Doug Baldwin 29-yard pass from Russell Wilson (Russell Wilson–Jimmy Graham pass), 3:00. Falcons 34–31. **Drive: 5 plays, 75 yards, 0:49.**

**Top passers**

- ARI – Matt Ryan – 19/27, 195 yards, 2 TD
- SEA – Russell Wilson – 26/42, 258 yards, 2 TD, INT

**Top rushers**

- ARI – Tevin Coleman – 20 rushes, 43 yards, TD
- SEA – Russell Wilson – 7 rushes, 86 yards, TD

**Top receivers**

- ARI – Julio Jones – 5 receptions, 71 yards
- SEA – Jimmy Graham – 7 receptions, 58 yards, TD

==== Week 12: vs. Tampa Bay Buccaneers ====
Week 12: Tampa Bay Buccaneers at Atlanta Falcons – Game summary

Quarter	1	2	3	4	Total
Buccaneers	3	3	7	7	**20**
**Falcons**	3	17	7	7	**34**

at Mercedes-Benz Stadium, Atlanta, Georgia

- Date: November 26
- Game time: 1:00 p.m. EST
- Game weather: Played indoors (retractable roof closed)
- Game attendance: 71,036
- Referee: Jeff Triplette
- TV announcers (Fox): Dick Stockton, Mark Schlereth, and Shannon Spake
- Recap, Gamebook

Game information

**First quarter**

- TB – Patrick Murray 36-yard field goal, 9:45. Buccaneers 3–0. **Drive: 10 plays, 57 yards, 5:15.**
- ATL – Matt Bryant 49-yard field goal, 3:50. Tied 3–3. **Drive: 13 plays, 43 yards, 5:55.**

**Second quarter**

- ATL – Julio Jones 51-yard pass from Mohamed Sanu (Matt Bryant kick), 12:36. Falcons 10–3. **Drive: 3 plays, 60 yards, 1:23.**
- ATL – Julio Jones 25-yard pass from Matt Ryan (Matt Bryant kick), 7:26. Falcons 17–3. **Drive: 6 plays, 72 yards, 3:12.**
- TB – Patrick Murray 27-yard field goal, 1:36. Falcons 17–6. **Drive: 14 plays, 74 yards, 5:50.**
- ATL – Matt Bryant 36-yard field goal, 0:00. Falcons 20–6. **Drive: 8 plays, 59 yards, 1:36.**

**Third quarter**

- ATL – Tevin Coleman 3-yard run (Matt Bryant kick), 10:04. Falcons 27–6. **Drive: 9 plays, 78 yards, 4:56.**
- TB – Peyton Barber 2-yard run (Patrick Murray kick), 6:07. Falcons 27–13. **Drive: 10 plays, 75 yards, 3:57.**

**Fourth quarter**

- TB – Peyton Barber 1-yard run (Patrick Murray kick), 13:47. Falcons 27–20. **Drive: 9 plays, 80 yards, 3:39.**
- ATL – Tevin Coleman 14-yard run (Matt Bryant kick), 1:53. Falcons 34–20. **Drive: 11 plays, 82 yards, 5:12.**

**Top passers**

- TB – Ryan Fitzpatrick – 27/44, 283 yards
- ATL – Matt Ryan – 26/35, 317 yards, TD

**Top rushers**

- TB – Doug Martin – 7 rushes, 33 yards
- ATL – Tevin Coleman – 19 rushes, 97 yards, 2 TD

**Top receivers**

- TB – DeSean Jackson – 8 receptions, 60 yards
- ATL – Julio Jones – 12 receptions, 253 yards, 2 TD

==== Week 13: vs. Minnesota Vikings ====
Week 13: Minnesota Vikings at Atlanta Falcons – Game summary

Quarter	1	2	3	4	Total
**Vikings**	0	7	0	7	**14**
Falcons	3	3	3	0	**9**

at Mercedes-Benz Stadium, Atlanta, Georgia

- Date: December 3
- Game time: 1:00 p.m. EST
- Game weather: Played indoors (retractable roof closed)
- Game attendance: 71,185
- Referee: Brad Allen
- TV announcers (Fox): Kevin Burkhardt, Charles Davis, and Pam Oliver
- Recap, Gamebook

Game information

**First quarter**

- ATL – Matt Bryant 38-yard field goal, 5:24. Falcons 3–0. **Drive: 15 plays, 58 yards, 7:24.**

**Second quarter**

- MIN – Jerick McKinnon 2-yard pass from Case Keenum (Kai Forbath kick), 10:01. Vikings 7–3. **Drive: 9 plays, 53 yards, 5:04.**
- ATL – Matt Bryant 36-yard field goal, 5:47. Vikings 7–6. **Drive: 8 plays, 65 yards, 4:14.**

**Third quarter**

- ATL – Matt Bryant 47-yard field goal, 11:57. Falcons 9–7. **Drive: 7 plays, 46 yards, 3:03.**

**Fourth quarter**

- MIN – Kyle Rudolph 6-yard pass from Case Keenum (Kai Forbath kick), 14:56. Vikings 14–9. **Drive: 15 plays, 89 yards, 8:15.**

**Top passers**

- MIN – Case Keenum – 25/30, 227 yards, 2 TD
- ATL – Matt Ryan – 16/29, 173 yards

**Top rushers**

- MIN – Latavius Murray – 16 rushes, 76 yards
- ATL – Devonta Freeman – 12 rushes, 74 yards

**Top receivers**

- MIN – Adam Thielen – 4 receptions, 51 yards
- ATL – Mohamed Sanu – 3 receptions, 43 yards

==== Week 14: vs. New Orleans Saints ====
Week 14: New Orleans Saints at Atlanta Falcons – Game summary

Quarter	1	2	3	4	Total
Saints	3	7	7	0	**17**
**Falcons**	3	7	0	10	**20**

at Mercedes-Benz Stadium, Atlanta, Georgia

- Date: December 7
- Game time: 8:25 p.m. EST
- Game weather: Played indoor (retractable roof closed)
- Game attendance: 72,866
- Referee: Clete Blakeman
- TV announcers (NBC/NFLN/Amazon Video): Mike Tirico, Cris Collinsworth, and Heather Cox
- Recap, Gamebook

Game information

**First quarter**

- NO – Wil Lutz 34-yard field goal, 9:50. Saints 3–0. **Drive: 10 plays, 54 yards, 5:10.**
- ATL – Matt Bryant 28-yard field goal, 5:33. Tied 3–3. **Drive: 8 plays, 65 yards, 4:17.**

**Second quarter**

- ATL – Devonta Freeman 1-yard run (Matt Bryant kick), 4:29. Falcons 10–3. **Drive: 15 plays, 90 yards, 8:27.**
- NO – Tommylee Lewis 26-yard pass from Drew Brees (Wil Lutz kick), 1:53. Tied 10–10. **Drive: 5 plays, 66 yards, 2:36.**

**Third quarter**

- NO – Michael Thomas 1-yard pass from Drew Brees (Wil Lutz kick), 13:10. Saints 17–10. **Drive: 4 plays, 29 yards, 1:36.**

**Fourth quarter**

- ATL – Mohamed Sanu 8-yard pass from Matt Ryan (Matt Bryant kick), 9:55. Tied 17–17. **Drive: 11 plays, 69 yards, 7:06.**
- ATL – Matt Bryant 52-yard field goal, 3:49. Falcons 20–17. **Drive: 8 plays, 38 yards, 3:57.**

**Top passers**

- NO – Drew Brees – 26/35, 271 yards, 2 TD, INT
- ATL – Matt Ryan – 15/27, 221 yards, TD, 3 INT

**Top rushers**

- NO – Mark Ingram II – 12 rushes, 49 yards
- ATL – Devonta Freeman – 24 rushes, 91 yards, TD

**Top receivers**

- NO – Michael Thomas – 10 receptions, 117 yards, TD
- ATL – Mohamed Sanu – 6 receptions, 83 yards, TD

==== Week 15: at Tampa Bay Buccaneers ====
Week 15: Atlanta Falcons at Tampa Bay Buccaneers – Game summary

Quarter	1	2	3	4	Total
**Falcons**	7	10	0	7	**24**
Buccaneers	7	0	7	7	**21**

at Raymond James Stadium, Tampa, Florida

- Date: December 18
- Game time: 8:30 p.m. EST
- Game weather: 71 °F (22 °C), clear
- Game attendance: 62,382
- Referee: John Hussey
- TV announcers (ESPN): Sean McDonough, Jon Gruden, and Lisa Salters
- Recap, Gamebook

Game information

**First quarter**

- ATL – Justin Hardy 6-yard pass from Matt Ryan (Matt Bryant kick), 6:54. Falcons 7–0. **Drive: 9 plays, 62 yards, 4:59.**
- TB – O. J. Howard 30-yard pass from Jameis Winston (Patrick Murray kick), 1:52. Tied 7–7. **Drive: 8 plays, 75 yards, 5:02.**

**Second quarter**

- ATL – Levine Toilolo fumble recovery in the end zone (Matt Bryant kick), 12:56. Falcons 14–7. **Drive: 9 plays, 77 yards, 3:56.**
- ATL – Matt Bryant 57-yard field goal, 3:12. Falcons 17–7. **Drive: 6 plays, 56 yards, 3:18.**

**Third quarter**

- TB – Mike Evans 42-yard pass from Jameis Winston (Patrick Murray kick), 8:31. Falcons 17–14. **Drive: 3 plays, 53 yards, 1:28.**

**Fourth quarter**

- ATL – Devonta Freeman 32-yard run (Matt Bryant kick), 7:58. Falcons 24–14. **Drive: 10 plays, 87 yards, 5:23.**
- TB – Adam Humphries 16-yard pass from Jameis Winston (Patrick Murray kick), 4:07. Falcons 24–21. **Drive: 10 plays, 75 yards, 3:51.**

**Top passers**

- ATL – Matt Ryan – 17/31, 212 yards, TD
- TB – Jameis Winston – 27/35, 299 yards, 3 TD

**Top rushers**

- ATL – Devonta Freeman – 22 rushes, 126 yards, TD
- TB – Peyton Barber – 13 rushes, 53 yards

**Top receivers**

- ATL – Devonta Freeman – 5 receptions, 68 yards
- TB – Mike Evans – 5 receptions, 79 yards, TD

With the win, the Falcons swept Tampa Bay to improve to 9-5 and 3-1 against the NFC South. Atlanta's win also eliminated Green Bay from postseason contention.

==== Week 16: at New Orleans Saints ====
Week 16: Atlanta Falcons at New Orleans Saints – Game summary

Quarter	1	2	3	4	Total
Falcons	0	0	3	10	**13**
**Saints**	3	10	7	3	**23**

at Mercedes-Benz Superdome, New Orleans, Louisiana

- Date: December 24
- Game time: 1:00 p.m. EST/12:00 p.m. CST
- Game weather: Played indoors (dome stadium)
- Game attendance: 73,188
- Referee: Pete Morelli
- TV announcers (Fox): Kevin Burkhardt, Charles Davis, and Pam Oliver
- Recap, Gamebook

Game information

**First quarter**

- NO – Wil Lutz 40-yard field goal, 7:31. Saints 3–0. **Drive: 8 plays, 40 yards, 4:04.**

**Second quarter**

- NO – Wil Lutz 29-yard field goal, 1:19. Saints 6–0. **Drive: 16 plays, 68 yards, 8:21.**
- NO – Ted Ginn Jr. 54-yard pass from Drew Brees (Wil Lutz kick), 0:14. Saints 13–0. **Drive: 3 plays, 64 yards, 0:36.**

**Third quarter**

- ATL – Matt Bryant 37-yard field goal, 9:34. Saints 13–3. **Drive: 7 plays, 29 yards, 2:23.**
- NO – Mark Ingram II 26-yard run (Wil Lutz kick), 2:52. Saints 20–3. **Drive: 4 plays, 54 yards, 2:01.**

**Fourth quarter**

- ATL – Matt Bryant 48-yard field goal, 10:18. Saints 20–6. **Drive: 5 plays, 18 yards, 1:06.**
- NO – Wil Lutz 45-yard field goal, 3:38. Saints 23–6. **Drive: 4 plays, 6 yards, 0:22.**
- ATL – Tevin Coleman 14-yard pass from Matt Ryan (Matt Bryant kick), 2:40. Saints 23–13. **Drive: 8 plays, 75 yards, 0:58.**

**Top passers**

- ATL – Matt Ryan – 22/36, 288 yards, TD, INT
- NO – Drew Brees – 21/28, 239 yards, TD, INT

**Top rushers**

- ATL – Devonta Freeman – 11 rushes, 36 yards
- NO – Mark Ingram II – 13 rushes, 44 yards, TD

**Top receivers**

- ATL – Julio Jones – 7 receptions, 149 yards
- NO – Ted Ginn Jr. – 4 receptions, 76 yards, TD

With the loss, Atlanta fell to 9-6 and 3-2 against the NFC South. The Falcons would finish 5-3 on the road.

==== Week 17: vs. Carolina Panthers ====
Week 17: Carolina Panthers at Atlanta Falcons – Game summary

Quarter	1	2	3	4	Total
Panthers	0	7	0	3	**10**
**Falcons**	7	0	6	9	**22**

at Mercedes-Benz Stadium, Atlanta, Georgia

- Date: December 31
- Game time: 4:25 p.m. EST
- Game weather: Played indoors (retractable roof closed)
- Game attendance: 74,141
- Referee: Bill Vinovich
- TV announcers (Fox): Joe Buck, Troy Aikman, Erin Andrews, and Mike Pereira
- Recap, Gamebook

Game information

**First quarter**

- ATL – Devonta Freeman 19-yard pass from Matt Ryan (Matt Bryant kick), 10:39. Falcons 7–0. **Drive: 10 plays, 75 yards, 4:28.**

**Second quarter**

- CAR – Devin Funchess 4-yard pass from Cam Newton (Graham Gano kick), 0:55. Tied 7–7. **Drive: 16 plays, 78 yards, 8:25.**

**Third quarter**

- ATL – Matt Bryant 30-yard field goal, 6:35. Falcons 10–7. **Drive: 13 plays, 68 yards, 6:55.**
- ATL – Matt Bryant 42-yard field goal, 3:49. Falcons 13–7. **Drive: 5 plays, 15 yards, 2:00.**

**Fourth quarter**

- ATL – Matt Bryant 30-yard field goal, 14:15. Falcons 16–7. **Drive: 8 plays, 60 yards, 3:26.**
- CAR – Graham Gano 42-yard field goal, 10:38. Falcons 16–10. **Drive: 7 plays, 51 yards, 3:37.**
- ATL – Matt Bryant 56-yard field goal, 6:43. Falcons 19–10. **Drive: 8 plays, 37 yards, 3:57.**
- ATL – Matt Bryant 33-yard field goal, 2:31. Falcons 22–10. **Drive: 4 plays, 8 yards, 1:41.**

**Top passers**

- CAR – Cam Newton – 14/34, 180 yards, TD, 3 INT
- ATL – Matt Ryan – 28/45, 317 yards, TD

**Top rushers**

- CAR – Cam Newton – 11 rushes, 59 yards
- ATL – Tevin Coleman – 11 rushes, 23 yards
- ATL – Devonta Freeman – 11 rushes, 23 yards

**Top receivers**

- CAR – Devin Funchess – 2 receptions, 48 yards, TD
- ATL – Devonta Freeman – 9 receptions, 85 yards, TD

With the win, alongside Arizona's win over Seattle, Atlanta clinched their second straight playoff berth and the #6 in the NFC. As of 2025, this is the latest time the Falcons had a winning record or clinched a playoff berth. The Falcons finished 4-2 against the NFC South and 5-3 at home.

=== Standings ===
==== Division ====
NFC South
	W	L	T	PCT	DIV	CONF	PF	PA	STK
^{(4)} New Orleans Saints	11	5	0	.688	4–2	8–4	448	326	L1
^{(5)} Carolina Panthers	11	5	0	.688	3–3	7–5	363	327	L1
^{(6)} Atlanta Falcons	10	6	0	.625	4–2	9–3	353	315	W1
Tampa Bay Buccaneers	5	11	0	.313	1–5	3–9	335	382	W1

==== Conference ====
NFC
#	Team	Division	W	L	T	PCT	DIV	CONF	SOS	SOV	STK
**Division leaders**
1 (Note: Philadelphia claimed the No. 1 seed over Minnesota based on winning percentage vs. common opponents. Philadelphia's cumulative record against Carolina, Chicago, the Los Angeles Rams and Washington was 5–0, compared to Minnesota's 4–1 cumulative record against the same four teams.)	Philadelphia Eagles	East	13	3	0	.813	5–1	10–2	.461	.433	L1
2	Minnesota Vikings	North	13	3	0	.813	5–1	10–2	.492	.447	W3
3 (Note: LA Rams claimed the No. 3 seed over New Orleans based on head-to-head victory.)	Los Angeles Rams	West	11	5	0	.688	4–2	7–5	.504	.460	L1
4 (Note: New Orleans clinched the NFC South division over Carolina based on head-to-head sweep.)	New Orleans Saints	South	11	5	0	.688	4–2	8–4	.535	.483	L1
**Wild Cards**
5	Carolina Panthers	South	11	5	0	.688	3–3	7–5	.539	.500	L1
6	Atlanta Falcons	South	10	6	0	.625	4–2	9–3	.543	.475	W1
**Did not qualify for the postseason**
7 (Note: Detroit finished ahead of Dallas and Seattle based on conference record, while Seattle finished ahead of Dallas based on head-to-head victory.)	Detroit Lions	North	9	7	0	.563	5–1	8–4	.496	.368	W1
8	Seattle Seahawks	West	9	7	0	.563	4–2	7–5	.492	.444	L1
9	Dallas Cowboys	East	9	7	0	.563	5–1	7–5	.496	.438	W1
10	Arizona Cardinals	West	8	8	0	.500	3–3	5–7	.488	.406	W2
11 (Note: Green Bay finished ahead of Washington based on record vs. common opponents. Green Bay's cumulative record against Dallas, Minnesota, New Orleans and Seattle was 2–3, compared to Washington's 1–4 cumulative record against the same four teams.)	Green Bay Packers	North	7	9	0	.438	2–4	5–7	.539	.357	L3
12	Washington Redskins	East	7	9	0	.438	1–5	5–7	.539	.429	L1
13	San Francisco 49ers	West	6	10	0	.375	1–5	3–9	.512	.438	W5
14 (Note: Tampa Bay finished ahead of Chicago based on head-to-head victory.)	Tampa Bay Buccaneers	South	5	11	0	.313	1–5	3–9	.555	.375	W1
15	Chicago Bears	North	5	11	0	.313	0–6	1–11	.559	.500	L1
16	New York Giants	East	3	13	0	.188	1–5	1–11	.531	.458	W1
**Tiebreakers** (Note: When breaking ties for three or more teams under the NFL's rules, they are first broken within divisions, then comparing only the highest-ranked remaining team from each division.)

== Postseason ==
=== Schedule ===
Round	Date	Opponent (seed)	Result	Record	Venue	Recap
Wild Card	January 6, 2018	at Los Angeles Rams (3)	W 26–13	1–0	Los Angeles Memorial Coliseum	Recap
Divisional	January 13, 2018	at Philadelphia Eagles (1)	L 10–15	1–1	Lincoln Financial Field	Recap

=== Game summaries ===
==== NFC Wild Card Playoffs: at (3) Los Angeles Rams ====
NFC Wild Card Playoffs: (6) Atlanta Falcons at (3) Los Angeles Rams – Game summary

Quarter	1	2	3	4	Total
Falcons	6	7	6	7	26
Rams	0	10	0	3	13

at Los Angeles Memorial Coliseum, Los Angeles, California

- Date: January 6, 2018
- Game time: 8:15 p.m. EST/5:15 p.m. PST
- Game weather: 62 °F (17 °C), cloudy
- Game attendance: 74,300
- Referee: Ed Hochuli
- TV announcers (NBC): Al Michaels, Cris Collinsworth and Michele Tafoya
- Recap, Gamebook

Game information

First quarter

- ATL – Matt Bryant 29-yard field goal, 7:13. Falcons 3–0. Drive: 4 plays, 6 yards, 1:27.
- ATL – Matt Bryant 51-yard field goal, 1:23. Falcons 6–0. Drive: 9 plays, 57 yards, 4:12.

Second quarter

- ATL – Devonta Freeman 3-yard run (Matt Bryant kick), 11:34. Falcons 13–0. Drive: 8 plays, 32 yards, 4:41.
- LAR – Cooper Kupp 14-yard pass from Jared Goff (Sam Ficken kick), 2:34. Falcons 13–7. Drive: 7 plays, 79 yards, 3:05.
- LAR – Sam Ficken 35-yard field goal, 0:03. Falcons 13–10. Drive: 6 plays, 67 yards, 1:12.

Third quarter

- ATL – Matt Bryant 25-yard field goal, 6:45. Falcons 16–10. Drive: 16 plays, 76 yards, 8:15.
- ATL – Matt Bryant 54-yard field goal, 0:19. Falcons 19–10. Drive: 10 plays, 45 yards, 4:52.

Fourth quarter

- LAR – Sam Ficken 32-yard field goal, 10:49. Falcons 19–13. Drive: 9 plays, 67 yards, 4:30.
- ATL – Julio Jones 8-yard pass from Matt Ryan (Matt Bryant kick), 5:48. Falcons 26–13. Drive: 8 plays, 83 yards, 5:01.

Top passers

- ATL – Matt Ryan — 21/30, 218 yards, TD
- LAR – Jared Goff — 24/45, 259 yards, TD

Top rushers

- ATL – Devonta Freeman — 18 rushes, 66 yards, TD
- LAR – Todd Gurley — 14 rushes, 101 yards

Top receivers

- ATL – Julio Jones — 9 receptions, 94 yards, TD
- LAR – Robert Woods — 9 receptions, 142 yards

With the win, the Falcons advanced to the Divisional Round to play against the Eagles. As of 2025, this marks the Falcons last playoff win.

==== NFC Divisional Playoffs: at (1) Philadelphia Eagles ====
NFC Divisional Playoffs: (6) Atlanta Falcons at (1) Philadelphia Eagles – Game summary

Quarter	1	2	3	4	Total
Falcons	3	7	0	0	10
Eagles	0	9	3	3	15

at Lincoln Financial Field, Philadelphia, Pennsylvania

- Date: January 13, 2018
- Game time: 4:35 p.m. EST
- Game weather: 32 °F (0 °C), sunny
- Game attendance: 69,596
- Referee: Bill Vinovich
- TV announcers (NBC): Al Michaels, Cris Collinsworth and Michele Tafoya
- Recap, Gamebook

Game information

First quarter

- ATL – Matt Bryant 33-yard field goal, 9:05. Falcons 3–0. Drive: 11 plays, 59 yards, 5:32.

Second quarter

- PHI – LeGarrette Blount 1-yard run (kick failed), 10:28. Eagles 6–3. Drive: 14 plays, 86 yards, 6:44.
- ATL – Devonta Freeman 6-yard pass from Matt Ryan (Matt Bryant kick), 5:41. Falcons 10–6. Drive: 4 plays, 18 yards, 1:50.
- PHI – Jake Elliott 53-yard field goal, 0:00. Falcons 10–9. Drive: 5 plays, 37 yards, 0:46.

Third quarter

- PHI – Jake Elliott 37-yard field goal, 0:11. Eagles 12–10. Drive: 12 plays, 74 yards, 5:42.

Fourth quarter

- PHI – Jake Elliott 21-yard field goal, 6:02. Eagles 15–10. Drive: 14 plays, 80 yards, 7:57.

Top passers

- ATL – Matt Ryan – 22/36, 210 yards, TD
- PHI – Nick Foles – 23/30, 246 yards

Top rushers

- ATL – Tevin Coleman – 10 rushes, 79 yards
- PHI – Jay Ajayi – 15 rushes, 54 yards

Top receivers

- ATL – Julio Jones – 9 receptions, 101 yards
- PHI – Alshon Jeffery – 4 receptions, 61 yards

With the loss, the Falcons season came to an end. As of 2025, this marks the Falcons last playoff game.
