= Tevin Coleman =

American football player (born 1993)

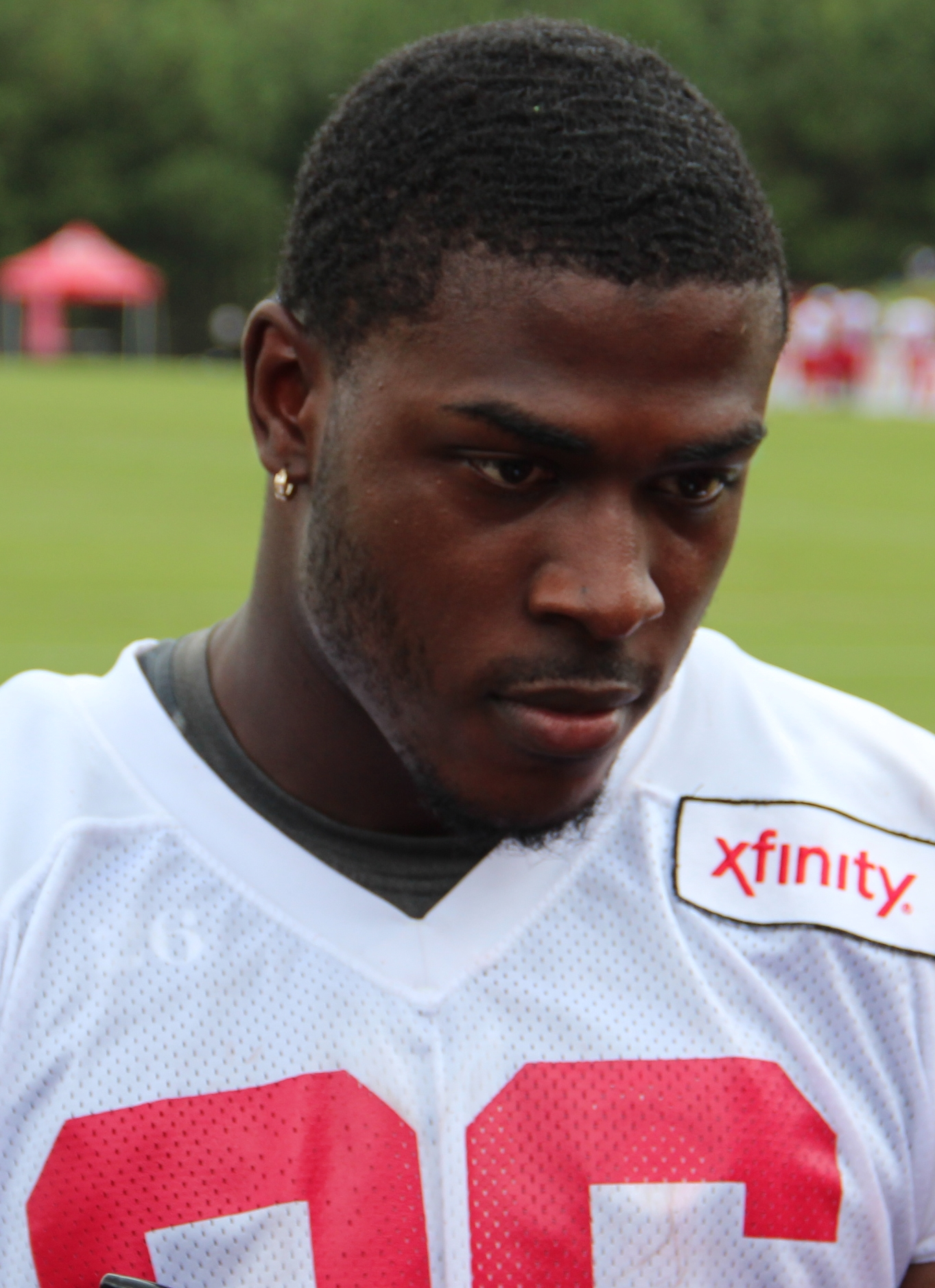
- Coleman with the Atlanta Falcons in 2015

No. 26, 23, 28
- Position: Running back

Personal information
- Born: April 16, 1993 (age 33); Tinley Park, Illinois, U.S.
- Listed height: 6 ft 1 in (1.85 m)
- Listed weight: 210 lb (95 kg)

Career information
- High school: Oak Forest (Oak Forest, Illinois)
- College: Indiana (2012–2014)
- NFL draft: 2015: 3rd round, 73rd overall pick

Career history
- Atlanta Falcons (2015–2018); San Francisco 49ers (2019–2020); New York Jets (2021); San Francisco 49ers (2022)

Awards and highlights
- Unanimous All-American (2014); First-team All-Big Ten (2014)

Career NFL statistics
- Rushing yards: 3,319
- Rushing average: 4.2
- Rushing touchdowns: 25
- Receptions: 131
- Receiving yards: 1,317
- Receiving touchdowns: 13
- Stats at Pro Football Reference

Tevin Ford Coleman (born April 16, 1993) is an American former professional football player who was a running back in the National Football League (NFL). He played college football for the Indiana Hoosiers, earning unanimous All-American honors in 2014. Coleman was selected by the Atlanta Falcons in the third round of the 2015 NFL draft. He also played for the San Francisco 49ers and New York Jets.

== Early life ==
Coleman attended Oak Forest High School in Oak Forest, Illinois. He played running back, wide receiver, and cornerback, and also returned kicks and punts. Coleman was named the 2011 Southtown Star Player of the Year. As a senior, he recorded 83 carries for 949 yards and 13 touchdowns to go along with 16 receptions for 345 yards and five touchdowns.

Coleman was also on the school's track & field team, where he competed as a sprinter and jumper. Coleman was one of the best 100-meter sprinters and long-jumpers in the state of Illinois as a high schooler. At the 2011 IHSA State Championships, he placed fourth in the 100m, at 10.86, and took second in the long jump, getting a personal-best mark of 7.16 meters. At the 2011 Thornton Classic Meet, Coleman took gold in the long jump, with a mark of 6.88 meters, and finished second in the 100 m, at 10.8 seconds. At the 2011 IHSA 2A State T&F Championship, he ran the 100 meters in a PR of 10.5 seconds, on his way to a second-place finish.

Considered a three-star recruit by the Rivals.com recruiting network, Coleman was ranked as the No. 37 running back nationally in 2012. He chose Indiana over scholarship offers from Georgia Tech, Minnesota, and Michigan State.

College recruiting
Name	Hometown	School	Height	Weight	Commit date
Tevin Coleman; RB	Oak Forest, IL	Oak Forest HS	6 ft 1 in (1.85 m)	202 lb (92 kg)	Jan 9, 2012
Tevin Coleman; RB	Recruit ratings: Scout: Rivals: 247Sports: ESPN:				
Overall recruit ranking: Scout: 47 (RB) Rivals: 37 (RB) 247Sports: 42 (RB) ESPN: 140 (WR)
Note: In many cases, Scout, Rivals, 247Sports, On3, and ESPN may conflict in their listings of height and weight.; In these cases, the average was taken. ESPN grades are on a 100-point scale.; Sources: "Indiana Football Commitment List". Rivals.; "2012 Player Commits". ESPN.; "2012 Team Ranking". Rivals.com.

== College career ==
Coleman attended and played college football at Indiana University Bloomington from 2012 to 2014 under Hoosiers head coach Kevin Wilson.

As a true freshman in 2012, Coleman played in 12 games with two starts. He rushed 51 times for 225 yards and a touchdown and also had 566 kick return yards and a touchdown.

As a sophomore in 2013, Coleman started the first nine games of the season, before suffering an ankle sprain that caused him to miss the final three games. Coleman finished the year with 131 carries for 958 yards and 12 touchdowns.

In the first game of his junior year in 2014, Coleman rushed for 247 yards and two touchdowns against Indiana State. In the next game at Bowling Green, he rushed for 190 yards and three touchdowns. On October 4 against North Texas, Coleman had 150 rushing yards and a rushing touchdown. The following week against Iowa, he had 219 rushing yards and three rushing touchdowns. Coleman's 307-yard day in a loss at Rutgers on November 15 became second highest rushing day in school history, behind only Anthony Thompson at Wisconsin in 1989. On November 22 against Ohio State, he had 228 rushing yards and three rushing touchdowns. Three days later, Coleman and fellow Big Ten Conference running backs Melvin Gordon (Wisconsin) and Ameer Abdullah (Nebraska) were named the three finalists for the Doak Walker Award. In the final game of the 2014 season, on November 29 versus rival Purdue, Coleman rushed for 130 yards on 29 carries, finishing the season with 2,036 yards. He became the 18th player in NCAA Division I FBS history to reach 2,000-yard rushing mark in a season. Coleman's 2,036 rushing yards also broke the school's single-season record, which had been held by Vaughn Dunbar who had 1,805 yards in 1991. Coleman finished seventh in the 2014 Heisman Trophy voting having received two first place votes.

On December 29, 2014, Coleman announced that he would forgo his senior season and enter the 2015 NFL draft.

== Professional career ==
Pre-draft measurables
Height	Weight	Arm length	Hand span	40-yard dash	10-yard split	20-yard split	Bench press
5 ft 11 3/8 in (1.81 m)	206 lb (93 kg)	32 in (0.81 m)	8 5/8 in (0.22 m)	4.40 s	1.52 s	2.48 s	22 reps
All values from NFL Combine/Indiana Pro Day

=== Atlanta Falcons ===
==== 2015 season ====
Coleman was selected by the Atlanta Falcons in the third round (73rd overall) of the 2015 NFL Draft. He was the fifth of 18 running backs to be selected that year. On May 12, 2015, Coleman signed his rookie contract, a four-year contract worth $3,219,012, with a $745,244 signing bonus.

Coleman was named the Falcons' feature running back to start the season due to an injury to Devonta Freeman. Coleman made his NFL debut in the season opener against the Philadelphia Eagles on Monday Night Football and finished the narrow 26–24 victory with a season-high 20 carries for 80 yards. In the next game against the New York Giants, Coleman rushed nine times for 32 yards and his first NFL touchdown before leaving the eventual 24–20 road loss during the second quarter with a fractured rib. As a result, Coleman missed the next two games against the Dallas Cowboys and Houston Texans, respectively. During Week 12 against the Minnesota Vikings, he had his first 100-yard game of his career with 18 carries for a season-high 110 yards in the 20–10 victory.

Coleman finished his rookie year with 87 carries for 392 yards and a touchdown to go along with two receptions for 14 yards in 12 games and three starts. His 392 rushing yards ranked 11th among rookies.

==== 2016 season ====
During the season opener against the Tampa Bay Buccaneers, Coleman rushed eight times for 22 yards and caught five passes for 95 yards in the 31–24 loss. In the next game against the Oakland Raiders, he recorded 12 carries for 46 yards and a touchdown to go along with two receptions for 25 yards during the 35–28 victory. The following week against the New Orleans Saints on Monday Night Football, Coleman had his first multi-touchdown game after recording 12 carries for 42 yards and three touchdowns to go along with three receptions for 47 yards in the 45–32 road victory.

During a Week 5 23–16 road victory over the Denver Broncos, Coleman had six carries for 31 yards to go along with four receptions for a career-high 132 yards and a touchdown. Two weeks later against the San Diego Chargers, Coleman recorded eight carries for 64 yards and a touchdown before leaving the eventual 33–30 overtime loss in the third quarter with a hamstring injury. As a result, Coleman missed the next two games against the Green Bay Packers and Buccaneers, respectively.

Coleman returned from injury in Week 12 against the Arizona Cardinals and finished the 38–19 victory with a rushing touchdown. Two weeks later against the Los Angeles Rams, he had eight carries for 36 yards and a touchdown to go along with two receptions for 19 yards and a touchdown in the 42–14 road victory. During a Week 16 33–16 road victory over the Carolina Panthers, Coleman recorded nine carries for 90 yards and a touchdown to go along with three receptions for 45 yards. In the regular season finale against the Saints, he had eight carries for 44 yards to go along with three receptions for 15 yards and a touchdown during the 38–32 victory.

Coleman finished his second professional season with 118 carries for 520 yards and eight touchdowns to go along with 31 receptions for 421 yards and three touchdowns in 13 games and no starts. His 6.3 yards per touch in 2016 was second among NFL running backs with over 100 touches (carries plus receptions). The Falcons finished atop the NFC South with an 11–5 record and clinched a first-round bye in the playoffs. In the Divisional Round against the Seattle Seahawks, Coleman had 11 carries for 57 yards to go along with three receptions for 22 yards and a touchdown during the 36–20 victory. During the NFC Championship Game against the Packers, he rushed 11 times for 29 yards and a touchdown and caught three passes for 35 yards in the 44–21 victory as the Falcons advanced to Super Bowl LI. In the Super Bowl against the New England Patriots, Coleman had seven carries for 29 yards and a six-yard touchdown reception. Despite being up 21–3 at halftime and 28–3 in the third quarter, the Falcons blew the largest lead in Super Bowl history and lost by a score of 34–28 in the first Super Bowl to be decided in overtime.

==== 2017 season ====
During a Week 2 34–23 victory over the Packers, Coleman had six carries for 42 yards and a three-yard touchdown reception in the first game at Mercedes-Benz Stadium. During Week 6 against the Miami Dolphins, he rushed nine times for 32 yards and a touchdown in the 20–17 loss.

During Week 9 against the Panthers, Coleman recorded five rushing yards and a 19-yard touchdown reception in the 20–17 road loss. In the next game against the Cowboys, he had 20 carries for 83 yards and a touchdown during the 27–7 victory. The following week against the Seahawks on Monday Night Football, Coleman recorded 20 carries for 43 yards and a touchdown to go along with a 15-yard reception in the 34–31 road victory.

During a Week 12 34–20 victory over the Buccaneers, Coleman had 19 carries for 97 yards and two touchdowns for his second career game with multiple touchdown scores. Coleman missed the Week 15 matchup against the Buccaneers due to a concussion. He returned the following week against the Saints and finished the 23–13 road loss with six carries for 12 yards to go along with four receptions for 40 yards and a touchdown.

Coleman finished the 2017 season with 156 carries for 628 yards and five touchdowns to go along with 27 receptions for 299 yards and three touchdowns in 15 games and three starts. The Falcons finished the season third in the NFC South with a 10-6 record and made the playoffs as the #6-seed in the NFC. During the Wild Card Round against the Rams, he recorded 14 carries for 40 yards and three receptions for 28 yards in the 26–13 road victory. In the Divisional Round against the Eagles, he rushed 10 times for 79 yards and caught a 14-yard reception during the 15–10 road loss.

==== 2018 season ====
During the season-opening 18–12 road loss to the Eagles, Coleman recorded nine carries for 19 yards and a touchdown to go along with a 26-yard reception. In the next game against the Panthers, he had 16 carries for 107 yards and four receptions for 18 yards during the 31–24 victory, marking his second career game with 100+ rushing yards. The following week against the Saints, Coleman rushed 15 times for 33 yards and caught two passes for 14 yards and a touchdown in the 43–37 overtime loss.

During Week 6 against the Buccaneers, Coleman had 10 carries for 35 yards and a six-yard touchdown reception in the 34–29 victory. Two days later, he was named the starter for the rest of the season after a season-ending injury to Devonta Freeman. In the next game against the Giants on Monday Night Football, Coleman recorded 11 carries for 50 yards and a touchdown to go along with two receptions for 32 yards during the 23–20 victory. Following a Week 8 bye, the Falcons went on the road to face the Washington Redskins. Coleman finished the 38–14 victory with 13 carries for 88 yards to go along with five receptions for 68 yards and two touchdowns.

During a Week 12 31–17 road loss to the Saints on Thanksgiving, Coleman had six rushing yards to go along with three receptions for 17 yards and a touchdown. Three weeks later against the Cardinals, he rushed 11 times for a career-high 145 yards in the 40–14 victory. In the regular season finale against the Buccaneers, Coleman recorded eight carries for 45 yards and a touchdown to go along with a nine-yard reception during the narrow 34–32 comeback victory.

Coleman finished the 2018 season with 167 carries for 800 yards and four touchdowns to go along with 32 receptions for 276 yards and five touchdowns in 16 games and 14 starts.

=== San Francisco 49ers (first stint) ===
==== 2019 season ====
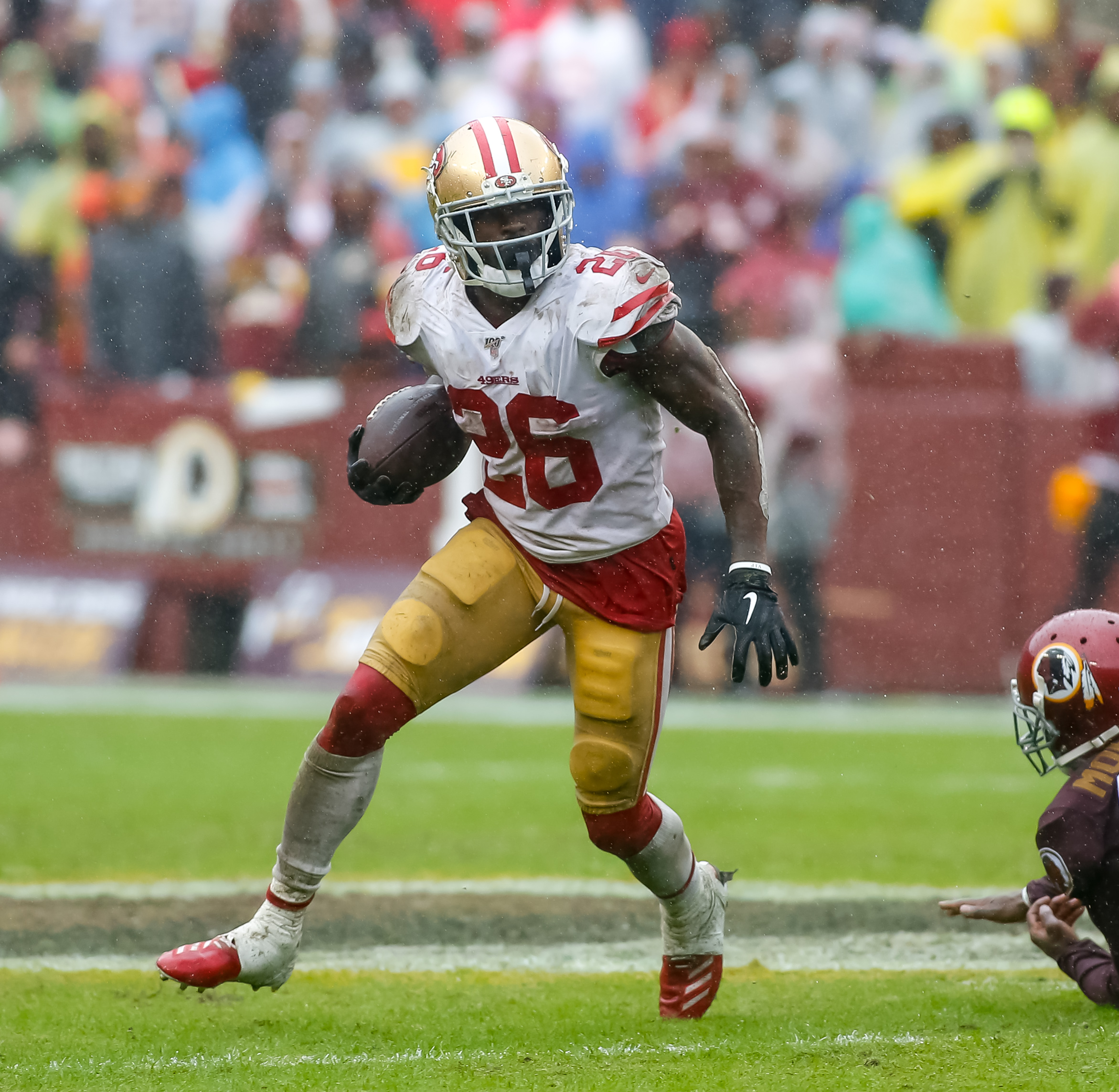
Coleman in 2019

On March 14, 2019, Coleman signed a two-year, $10 million contract with the San Francisco 49ers, reuniting with head coach Kyle Shanahan, who was the offensive coordinator during Coleman's first two years with the Falcons.

During the season-opening 31–17 road victory over the Buccaneers, Coleman had six times for 23 yards and two receptions for 33 yards, but suffered a high-ankle sprain that kept him sidelined for four weeks. Coleman returned from injury in Week 5 against the Cleveland Browns and rushed 16 times for 97 yards and his first touchdown of the season during the 31–3 victory. In the next game against the Rams, Coleman recorded 18 carries for 45 yards and a touchdown to go along with two receptions for 16 yards during the 20–7 road victory.

During Week 8 against the Panthers, Coleman recorded 11 carries for 105 yards and three touchdowns to go along with two receptions for 13 yards in the 51–13 victory. He was just the third 49er to score four touchdowns in a game, and the first since Hall-of-Famer Jerry Rice in 1993. During a Week 12 37–8 victory over the Packers, Coleman had 11 carries for 39 yards and a touchdown to go along with two receptions for 10 yards.

Coleman finished the 2019 season with 137 carries for 544 yards and six touchdowns to go along with 21 receptions for 180 yards and a touchdown in 14 games and 11 starts. The 49ers finished the season atop the NFC West with a 13–3 record and earned the #1-seed in the NFC. In the Divisional Round against the Vikings, Coleman rushed 22 times for 105 yards and two touchdowns during the 27–10 victory. During the NFC Championship Game against the Packers, he had six carries for 21 yards before leaving the eventual 37–20 victory in the second quarter with a shoulder injury as the 49ers advanced to Super Bowl LIV. In the Super Bowl against the Kansas City Chiefs, Coleman recorded five carries for 28 yards and caught a three-yard pass during the 31–20 loss.

==== 2020 season ====
On September 26, 2020, Coleman was placed on injured reserve after suffering a sprained knee in Week 2. He was activated on October 31.

Coleman finished the 2020 season with 28 carries for 53 yards and four receptions for 34 yards in eight games and one start.

=== New York Jets ===
==== 2021 season ====
On March 25, 2021, Coleman signed a one-year, $2 million contract with New York Jets.

Coleman finished the 2021 season second on the team with 84 carries for 356 yards and 11 receptions for 49 yards in 11 games and five starts.

==== 2022 season ====
On March 17, 2022, Coleman re-signed with the Jets. He was released on August 30.

=== San Francisco 49ers (second stint) ===
On September 21, 2022, Coleman signed with the practice squad of the San Francisco 49ers. He was signed to the active roster on October 12. During Week 5 against the Panthers, he had eight carries for 23 yards and a touchdown to go along with three receptions for 44 yards and a touchdown in the 37–15 victory.

On October 25, Coleman was released, but was re-signed to the practice squad the next day. His practice squad contract with the team expired after the season on January 29, 2023.

== Career statistics ==
=== NFL ===
==== Regular season ====
Year	Team	Games		Rushing					Receiving					Fumbles	
Year	Team	GP	GS	Att	Yds	Avg	Lng	TD	Rec	Yds	Avg	Lng	TD	Fum	Lost
2015	ATL	12	3	87	392	4.5	46	1	2	14	7.0	10	0	3	3
2016	ATL	13	0	118	520	4.4	55T	8	31	421	13.6	49	3	1	0
2017	ATL	15	3	156	628	4.0	52	5	27	299	11.1	39	3	1	0
2018	ATL	16	14	167	800	4.8	65	4	32	276	8.6	39	5	2	0
2019	SF	14	11	137	544	4.0	48T	6	21	180	8.6	37	1	0	0
2020	SF	8	1	28	53	1.9	12	0	4	34	8.5	18	0	0	0
2021	NYJ	11	5	84	356	4.2	20	0	11	49	4.5	11	0	0	0
2022	SF	5	0	12	26	2.2	14	1	3	44	14.7	30	1	0	0
Career		94	37	789	3,319	4.2	65	25	131	1,317	10.1	49	13	7	3

==== Postseason ====
Year	Team	Games		Rushing					Receiving					Fumbles	
Year	Team	GP	GS	Att	Yds	Avg	Lng	TD	Rec	Yds	Avg	Lng	TD	Fum	Lost
2016	ATL	3	0	29	115	4.0	15	1	7	63	9.0	17	2	0	0
2017	ATL	2	0	24	119	5.0	23	0	4	42	10.5	14	0	0	0
2019	SF	3	2	33	154	4.7	17	2	1	3	3.0	3	0	0	0
2022	SF	0	0	DNP											
Career		8	2	81	360	4.4	23	3	12	108	9.0	17	2	0	0

=== College ===
Year	Team	Rushing					Receiving			Kick returns			
Year	Team	Att	Yds	Avg	Y/G	TD	Rec	Yds	TD	Att	Yds	Avg	TD
2012	Indiana	51	225	4.4	18.8	1	10	49	0	24	566	23.6	1
2013	Indiana	131	958	7.3	106.4	12	19	193	0	6	124	20.7	0
2014	Indiana	270	2,036	7.5	169.7	15	25	141	0	0	0	0.0	0
Career		452	3,219	7.1	97.5	28	54	383	0	30	690	23.0	1
