= Devonta Freeman =

American football player (born 1992)

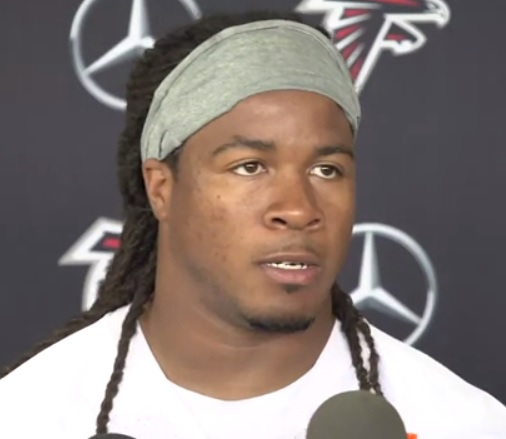
- Freeman with the Atlanta Falcons in 2018

No. 24, 31, 33
- Position: Running back

Personal information
- Born: March 15, 1992 (age 34); Miami, Florida, U.S.
- Listed height: 5 ft 8 in (1.73 m)
- Listed weight: 206 lb (93 kg)

Career information
- High school: Miami Central (West Little River, Florida)
- College: Florida State (2011–2013)
- NFL draft: 2014: 4th round, 103rd overall pick

Career history
- Atlanta Falcons (2014–2019); New York Giants (2020); Buffalo Bills (2020)*; New Orleans Saints (2021)*; Baltimore Ravens (2021)
- * Offseason or practice squad member only

Awards and highlights
- Second-team All-Pro (2015); 2× Pro Bowl (2015, 2016); NFL rushing touchdowns co-leader (2015); BCS national champion (2013); First-team All-ACC (2013)

Career NFL statistics
- Rushing yards: 4,720
- Rushing average: 4.1
- Rushing touchdowns: 38
- Receptions: 298
- Receiving yards: 2,263
- Receiving touchdowns: 12
- Stats at Pro Football Reference

Devonta Cornellius Freeman (/dəˈvɒnteɪ/ de-VON-tay; born March 15, 1992) is an American former professional football player who was a running back in the National Football League (NFL). He played college football for the Florida State Seminoles and was selected by the Atlanta Falcons in the fourth round of the 2014 NFL draft. Freeman was also a member of the New York Giants, Buffalo Bills, New Orleans Saints, and Baltimore Ravens.

== Early life ==
Freeman attended Miami Central High School in West Little River, Florida. He helped lead the Rockets football team to the 2010 Class 6A state championship and was named the MVP after gaining 308 yards on 38 carries, falling just 20 yards shy of a state championship game record. As a senior, Freeman ran for a Miami-Dade County leading 2,208 yards and 26 touchdowns and also recorded 663 rushing yards and six touchdowns in the final two games of the state playoffs.

Considered a four-star recruit by Rivals.com, Freeman was rated the best running back in the nation. He committed to Florida State on June 24, 2010.

== College career ==
Freeman attended and played college football for Florida State from 2011 to 2013.

=== 2011 season ===
As a freshman at Florida State, Freeman immediately became a major contributor to the Seminoles' running game in their 9–4 season. He had two games with over 100 rushing yards and had a stretch of four games of scoring at least one rushing touchdown through the end of October and the start of November. Freeman had 120 carries for 579 yards and eight touchdowns as a freshman. He finished the season as the Seminoles' leading rusher in major categories.

=== 2012 season ===
As a sophomore, Freeman shared the backfield primarily with James Wilder Jr. and Chris Thompson. Freeman recorded two 100+-yard rushing games and three games with two rushing touchdowns. Florida State finished with a 10–2 regular season record and qualified for the ACC Championship. In the ACC Championship against Georgia Tech, he had 59 rushing yards and a touchdown during the 21–15 victory. Freeman finished the season with 111 carries for 660 yards and eight touchdowns.

=== 2013 season ===
As a junior, Freeman provided strong and consistent production for the Seminoles. In the second game of the season against Nevada and the third game against Bethune-Cookman, Freeman went over 100 rushing yards and scored a rushing touchdown. On October 5 against Maryland, he started a streak of 10 straight games with a rushing touchdown. In that stretch was a game against Miami, where Freeman rushed for 78 yards and two touchdowns to go along with six receptions for 98 yards and a touchdown. As a junior, he was a first-team All-Atlantic Coast Conference (ACC) selection and helped the Florida State Seminoles win the 2014 BCS National Championship Game over Auburn by a score of 34–31. Freeman rushed for over 1,000 yards, the first Seminole to do so since Warrick Dunn in 1996. Freeman finished the season with career highs in rushing yards (1,016), receiving yards (278), and touchdowns (15) despite splitting carries with James Wilder, Jr. and Karlos Williams in Florida State's backfield. Freeman led the Seminoles in rushing in each of his three seasons in Tallahassee.

On January 11, 2014, Freeman announced that he would forgo his senior season and enter the 2014 NFL draft.

== Professional career ==
Pre-draft measurables
Height	Weight	Arm length	Hand span	Wingspan	40-yard dash	10-yard split	20-yard split	20-yard shuttle	Three-cone drill	Vertical jump	Broad jump	Bench press
5 ft 8 1/4 in (1.73 m)	206 lb (93 kg)	29 3/8 in (0.75 m)	9 5/8 in (0.24 m)	5 ft 11 3/4 in (1.82 m)	4.58 s	1.66 s	2.69 s	4.26 s	7.11 s	32.0 in (0.81 m)	9 ft 10 in (3.00 m)	14 reps
All values from NFL Combine/Pro Day

=== Atlanta Falcons ===
==== 2014 season ====
Freeman was drafted by the Atlanta Falcons in the fourth round (103rd overall) of the 2014 NFL draft. He was the eighth running back selected in the draft.

As a rookie, Freeman shared touches with fellow running backs Steven Jackson, Jacquizz Rodgers, and Antone Smith. He made his NFL debut in the season-opener at Georgia Dome against the New Orleans Saints and finished the 37–34 overtime victory with two carries for 15 yards and two receptions for 18 yards. During Week 8 against the Detroit Lions, he scored his first career touchdown on a seven-yard reception from Matt Ryan in the first quarter of the narrow 22–21 loss. During a Week 16 30–14 road victory over the Saints, Freeman scored his first career rushing touchdown on a 31-yard rush in the third quarter.

Freeman finished his rookie year with 65 carries for 248 yards and a touchdown to go along with 30 receptions for 225 yards and two touchdowns in 16 games and no starts.

==== 2015 season ====
During Week 2 against the New York Giants, Freeman recorded 12 carries for 25 yards and his first touchdown of the season to go along with four receptions for 34 yards in the 24–20 road loss. In the next game against the Dallas Cowboys, he received his first career start and had a breakout performance by rushing 30 times for a then career-high 141 yards and three touchdowns while also catching five passes for 52 yards during the 39–28 victory. The following week against the Houston Texans, Freeman had 14 carries for 68 yards and three touchdowns to go along with five receptions for 81 yards during the 48–21 victory.

During a Week 5 25–19 overtime victory over the Washington Redskins, Freeman rushed 27 times for a career-high 153 yards. In the next game against the Saints on Thursday Night Football, he recorded 13 carries for 100 yards and a touchdown to go along with eight receptions for 56 yards and a touchdown during the 31–21 road loss. The following week against the Tennessee Titans, Freeman had 25 carries for 116 yards in the 10–7 road victory.

During Week 9 against the San Francisco 49ers, Freeman had 12 rushing yards and eight receptions for 67 yards and a touchdown in the narrow 17–16 road loss. Two weeks later against the Indianapolis Colts, he rushed thrice for 43 yards before leaving the eventual 24–21 loss in the first quarter with a concussion. Freeman missed the next game against the Minnesota Vikings as a result.

During a Week 15 23–17 road victory over the Jacksonville Jaguars, Freeman recorded 25 carries for 56 yards and a touchdown to go along with seven receptions for 45 yards. In the next game against the Carolina Panthers, he rushed 22 times for 73 yards and a touchdown while also catching three passes for 17 yards during the 20–13 victory. During the regular season finale against the Saints, Freeman had 24 carries for 81 yards to go along with two receptions for 18 yards and a touchdown in the 20–17 loss.

Freeman finished his second professional season with 1,634 yards-from-scrimmage (fifth in the NFL), 14 all-purpose touchdowns (first) with 1,056 rushing yards (seventh), and a league-leading 11 rushing touchdowns. He also ranked third among NFL running backs in both receptions (73) and receiving yards (578) while also recording three receiving touchdowns. Freeman was selected to the Pro Bowl, the first of his career, and was named a Second-team All-Pro. Freeman was named one of the captains, along with Geno Atkins of the Cincinnati Bengals, for Team Irvin in the 2016 Pro Bowl. Freeman was ranked as the 50th best player in the NFL and the fifth best running back by his fellow players on the NFL Top 100 Players of 2016.

==== 2016 season ====
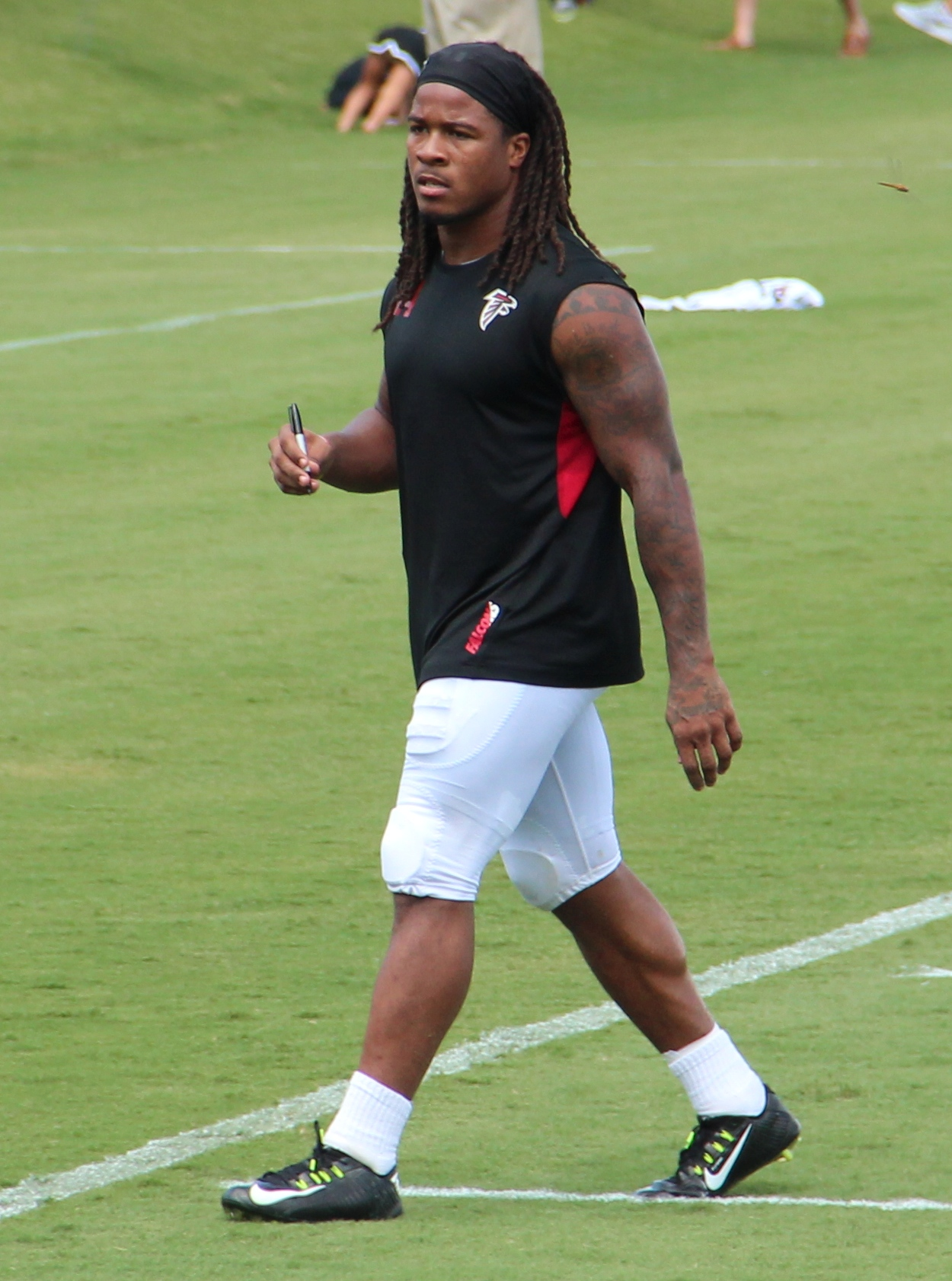
Freeman at training camp in 2016

Freeman and Tevin Coleman provided the Falcons with a solid running back combination to help pace a historic offense in 2016.

During Week 3 against the Saints on Monday Night Football, Freeman had 14 carries for 155 yards to go along with five receptions for 55 yards and a touchdown in the 45–32 road victory. In the next game against the Panthers, he rushed 13 times for 57 yards and his touchdown of the season during the 48–33 victory. The following week against the Denver Broncos, Freeman recorded 23 carries for 88 yards and a touchdown to go along with three receptions for 35 yards in the 23–16 road victory. Three weeks later against the Green Bay Packers, he had 11 carries for 35 yards and a touchdown to go along with four receptions for 23 yards and a touchdown during the narrow 33–32 victory.

During a Week 12 38–19 victory over the Arizona Cardinals, Freeman recorded 16 carries for 60 yards and two touchdowns to go along with two receptions for 17 yards. In the next game against the Kansas City Chiefs, he rushed 15 times for 56 yards and two touchdowns while also catching four passes for 49 yards during the narrow 29–28 loss. Two weeks later against the 49ers, Freeman had 20 carries for 139 yards for three touchdowns to go along with two receptions for 16 yards in the 41–13 victory. He was named NFC Offensive Player of the Week for his performance. In the regular season finale against the Saints, Freeman recorded 12 carries for 96 yards and a touchdown to go along with five receptions for 81 yards during the 38–32 victory.

Freeman was named to his second consecutive Pro Bowl as an original selection behind Ezekiel Elliott and David Johnson, and played a significant role in the Falcons finishing atop the NFC South with an 11–5 record and earning the #2 seed in the NFC. In the Divisional Round against the Seattle Seahawks, Freeman had 14 carries for 45 yards and his first career postseason touchdown to go along with four receptions for 80 yards during the 36–20 victory. During the NFC Championship Game against the Packers, Freeman recorded 14 carries for 42 yards and four receptions for 42 yards and his first career postseason receiving touchdown in the 44–21 victory as the Falcons advanced to Super Bowl LI. In the Super Bowl against the New England Patriots, Freeman had 11 carries for 75 yards and two receptions for 46 yards while scoring the first points for either team with a rushing touchdown in the second quarter of the 34–28 overtime loss. Freeman was ranked as the 41st best player in the NFL and the sixth best running back by his fellow players on the NFL Top 100 Players of 2017.

==== 2017 season ====
On August 9, 2017, Freeman signed a five-year, $41.25 million contract extension with the Falcons to become the highest paid running back in the NFL.

During the season opener against the Chicago Bears, Freeman rushed 12 times for 37 yards and a touchdown in the 23–17 road victory. In the next game against the Packers, he recorded 19 carries for 84 yards and two touchdowns to go along with two receptions for 16 yards during the 34–23 victory. Freeman's first touchdown was the first ever touchdown in the history of Mercedes-Benz Stadium. The following week against the Lions, he recorded 21 carries for 106 yards and a touchdown to go along with three receptions for 32 yards in the 30–26 road victory.

During a Week 4 23–17 loss to the Buffalo Bills, Freeman recorded 18 carries for 58 yards and a touchdown to go along with two receptions for 20 yards. Despite splitting carries with Tevin Coleman, he scored five rushing touchdowns in the first four games to lead the NFL. During Week 10 against the Cowboys, Freeman rushed twice for three yards before leaving the eventual 27–7 victory with a concussion and missed the next two games as a result.

During Week 14 against the Saints on Thursday Night Football, Freeman rushed 24 times for 91 yards and a touchdown in the 20–17 victory. In the next game against the Tampa Bay Buccaneers on Monday Night Football, he had 22 carries for 126 yards and a touchdown during the 24–21 road victory. During the regular season finale against the Panthers, he recorded 11 carries for 23 yards to go along with nine receptions for 85 yards and a touchdown in the 22–10 victory.

Freeman finished the 2017 season with 196 carries for 865 yards and seven touchdowns to go along with 36 receptions for 317 yards and a touchdown in 14 games and starts. The Falcons finished third in the NFC South with a 10–6 record and qualified for the playoffs as the #6-seed. During the Wild Card Roundagainst the Los Angeles Rams, Freeman recorded 18 carries for 66 yards and a touchdown in the 26–13 road victory. In the Divisional Round against the eventual Super Bowl champion Philadelphia Eagles, he had seven rushing yards and five receptions for 26 yards and a touchdown during the 15–10 road loss, marking his fifth consecutive postseason game with a touchdown. Freeman was ranked 70th by his peers on the NFL Top 100 Players of 2018.

==== 2018 season ====
During the season opener against the Eagles, Freeman had six carries for 36 yards and three receptions for 14 yards before leaving the eventual 18–12 road loss in the fourth quarter with a knee injury. He missed the next three games as a result.

Freeman returned in Week 5 against the Pittsburgh Steelers before injuring his foot and experiencing soreness in his groin. Freeman missed the next game against the Buccaneers, and it was later revealed that he required groin surgery. Freeman was placed on injured reserve on October 16, 2018. He finished the 2018 season with 14 carries for 68 yards and five receptions for 23 yards in two games and starts.

==== 2019 season ====
During Week 5 against the Texans, Freeman recorded 11 carries for 30 yards to go along with five receptions for 40 yards and a touchdown in the 53–32 road loss. In the next game against the Arizona Cardinals, he had 19 carries for 88 yards to go along with three receptions for 30 yards and two touchdowns during the narrow 34–33 road loss. The following week against the Rams, Freeman rushed seven times for 19 yards before being ejected in the third quarter of the 37–10 loss after punching Aaron Donald.

During a Week 14 40–20 victory over the Panthers, Freeman had 17 carries for 84 yards and a touchdown. Two weeks later against the Jaguars, he recorded 13 carries for 53 yards and a touchdown to go along with nine receptions for 74 yards and a touchdown in the 24–12 victory.

Freeman finished the 2019 season with 184 carries for 656 yards and two touchdowns to go along with 59 receptions for 410 yards and four touchdowns 14 games and starts. He was released on March 16, 2020.

=== New York Giants ===
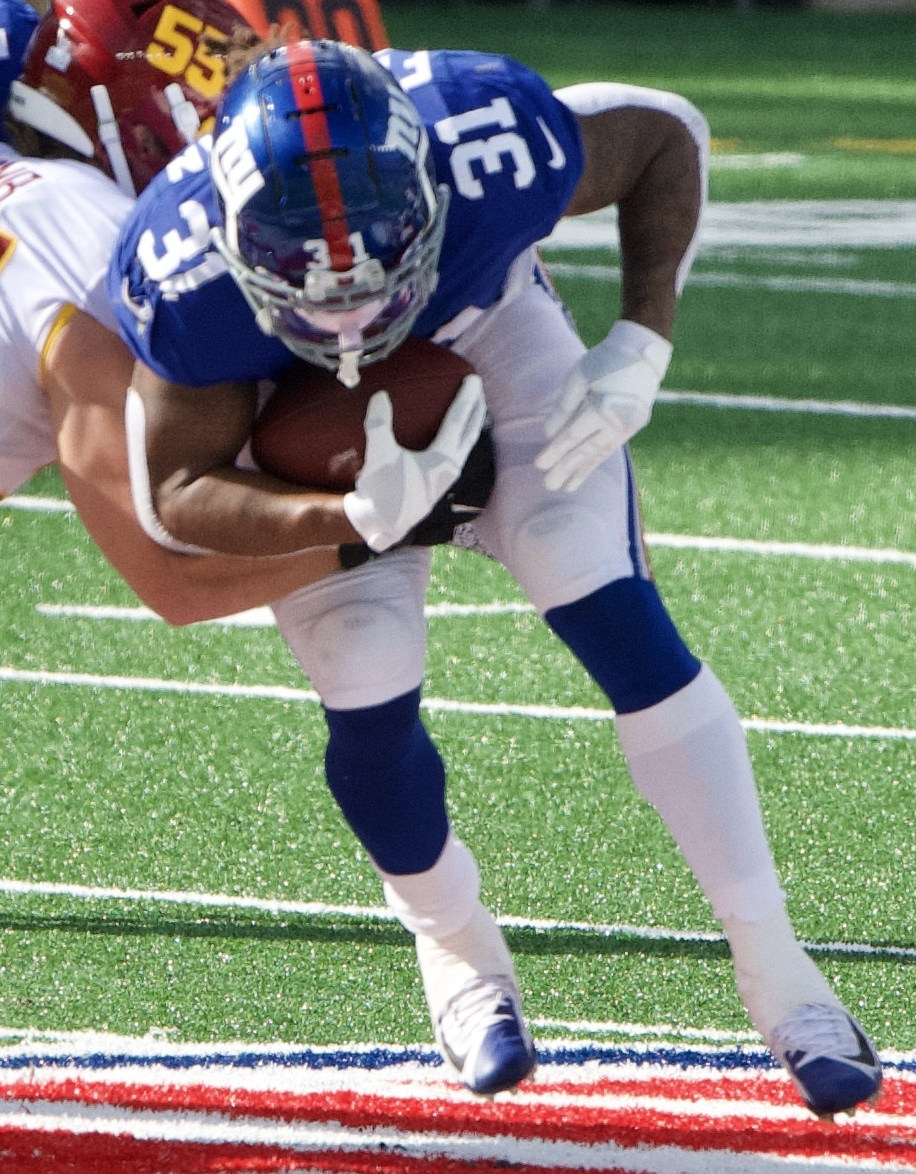
Freeman in 2020

On September 23, 2020, Freeman signed a one-year, $3 million contract with the New York Giants.

During Week 5 against the Cowboys, Freeman recorded 17 carries for 60 yards and a touchdown to go along with two receptions for 27 yards in the 37–34 road loss. In the next game against the Washington Football Team, he rushed 18 times for 61 yards during the narrow 20–19 victory.

On November 13, Freeman was placed on injured reserve with an ankle injury. He was placed on the reserve/COVID-19 list on December 5, and was moved back to injured reserve 12 days later. Freeman was designated to return from injured reserve on December 18 and began practicing with the team again. However, he did not return before the end of the regular season and was waived on January 7, 2021.

Freeman finished the 2020 season with 54 carries for 172 yards and a touchdown to go along with seven receptions for 58 yards in five games and four starts.

=== Buffalo Bills ===
On January 12, 2021, Freeman was signed to the Buffalo Bills' practice squad. His practice squad contract with the team expired after the season on February 1.

=== New Orleans Saints ===
On August 1, 2021, Freeman signed with the New Orleans Saints. He was released by New Orleans on August 31.

=== Baltimore Ravens ===
On September 9, 2021, the Baltimore Ravens signed Freeman on their practice squad following injuries to J. K. Dobbins, Justice Hill, and Gus Edwards. Exactly a week later, the Ravens signed Freeman to their active roster after Trenton Cannon was released.

Freeman made his Ravens debut in Week 2 against the Kansas City Chiefs and rushed twice for 29 yards during the narrow 36–35 victory. During Week 6 against the Los Angeles Chargers, Freeman had nine carries for 53 yards and a touchdown. In the next game against the Cincinnati Bengals, he recorded four carries for 14 yards and a touchdown to go along with three receptions for 25 yards during the 41–17 loss. Two weeks later against the Minnesota Vikings, Freeman had 13 carries for 79 yards to go along with two receptions for four yards and a touchdown in the 34–31 overtime victory.

During a Week 11 16–13 road victory over the Chicago Bears, Freeman recorded 16 carries for 49 yards and a touchdown to go along with six receptions for 31 yards. Two weeks later against the Pittsburgh Steelers, he had 14 carries for 52 yards and a touchdown to go along with 45 yards in the narrow 20–19 road loss. During Week 16 against the Bengals, Freeman rushed six times for 17 yards and a touchdown in the 41–21 road loss.

Freeman finished the 2021 season with 133 carries for 576 yards and five touchdowns to go along with 34 receptions for 190 yards and a touchdown in 16 games and eight starts.

== Career statistics ==
=== NFL ===
Legend
	Led the league
**Bold**	Career high

==== Regular season ====
Year	Team	Games		Rushing					Receiving					Fumbles	
Year	Team	GP	GS	Att	Yds	Avg	Lng	TD	Rec	Yds	Avg	Lng	TD	Fum	Lost
2014	ATL	**16**	0	65	248	3.8	31T	1	30	225	7.5	36	1	1	1
2015	ATL	15	13	**265**	1,056	4.0	39	**11**	**73**	**578**	7.9	**44**	3	3	**2**
2016	ATL	**16**	**16**	227	**1,079**	4.8	**75T**	**11**	54	462	8.6	35	2	1	1
2017	ATL	14	14	196	865	4.4	44	7	36	317	**8.8**	29	1	**4**	1
2018	ATL	2	2	14	68	**4.9**	20	0	5	23	4.6	14	0	0	0
2019	ATL	14	14	184	656	3.6	28	2	59	410	6.9	28	**4**	3	**2**
2020	NYG	5	4	54	172	3.2	14	1	7	58	8.3	18	0	0	0
2021	BAL	**16**	8	133	576	4.3	32	5	34	190	5.6	15	1	0	0
Career		98	71	1,138	4,720	4.1	75T	38	298	2,263	7.6	44	12	12	7

==== Postseason ====
Year	Team	Games		Rushing					Receiving					Fumbles	
Year	Team	GP	GS	Att	Yds	Avg	Lng	TD	Rec	Yds	Avg	Lng	TD	Fum	Lost
2016	ATL	**3**	**3**	**39**	**162**	**4.2**	**37**	**2**	**10**	**168**	**16.8**	**53**	**1**	0	0
2017	ATL	2	2	28	73	2.6	22	1	6	29	4.8	13	**1**	0	0
Career		5	5	67	235	3.5	37	3	16	197	12.3	53	2	0	0

=== College ===
Season	Team	Rushing					Receiving		
Season	Team	Att	Yds	Avg	Lng	TD	Rec	Yds	TD
2011	Florida State	120	579	4.8	41	8	15	111	0
2012	Florida State	111	660	5.9	47	8	10	86	0
2013	Florida State	173	1,016	5.9	60	14	22	278	1
Career		404	2,255	5.6	60	30	47	475	1

== Personal life ==
Freeman's jersey number with the Falcons was 24 in honor of an aunt who died at age 24 from a heart attack when Freeman was a teenager.
