= Blidi Wreh-Wilson =

American football player (born 1989)

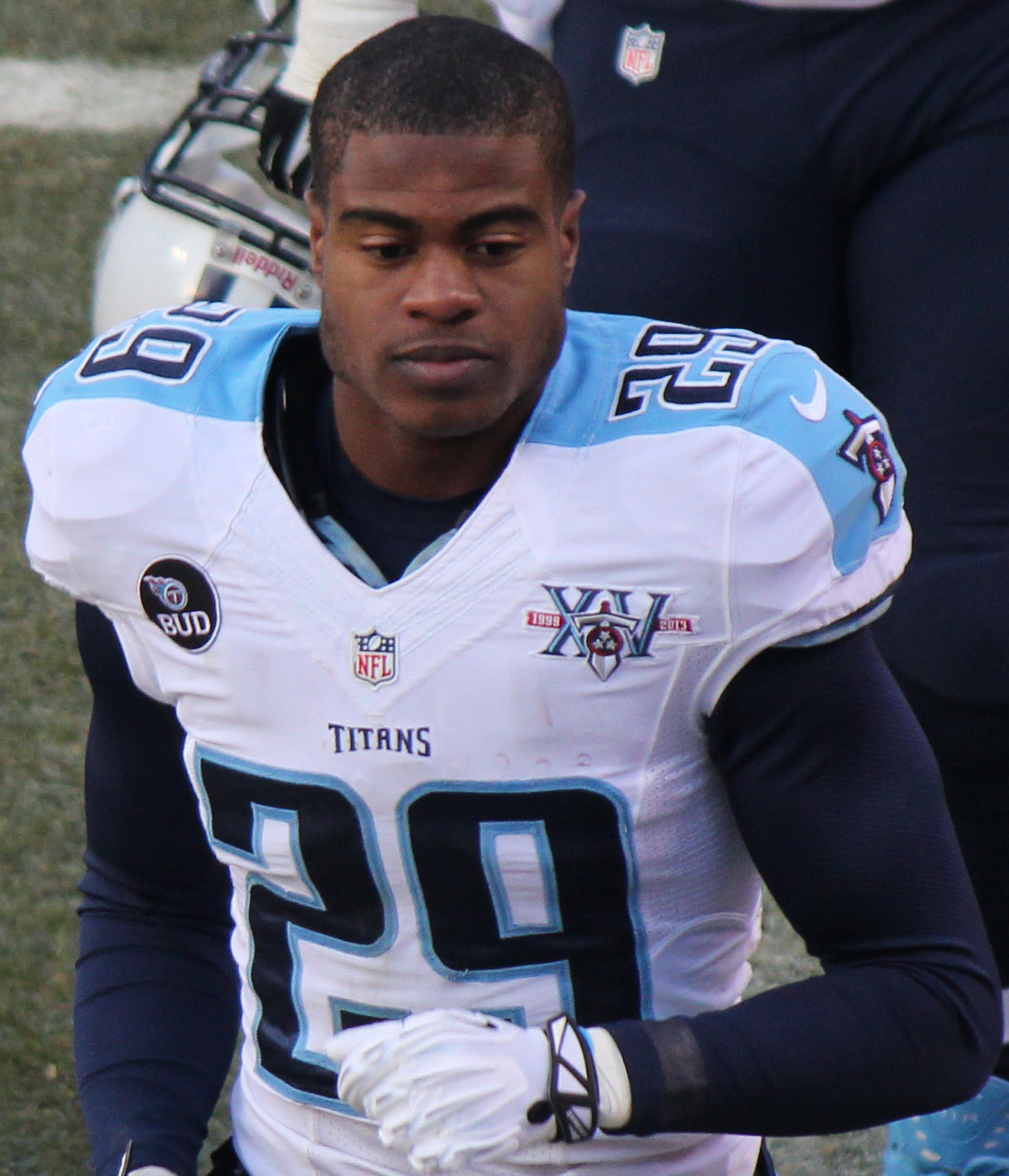
- Wreh-Wilson with the Tennessee Titans in 2013

No. 29, 25, 38, 33, 36
- Position: Cornerback

Personal information
- Born: December 5, 1989 (age 36); Edinboro, Pennsylvania, U.S.
- Listed height: 6 ft 1 in (1.85 m)
- Listed weight: 190 lb (86 kg)

Career information
- High school: General McLane (Edinboro)
- College: Connecticut (2008–2012)
- NFL draft: 2013: 3rd round, 70th overall pick

Career history
- Tennessee Titans (2013–2015); Atlanta Falcons (2016–2020); Las Vegas Raiders (2021)*; Tampa Bay Buccaneers (2021)
- * Offseason or practice squad member only

Awards and highlights
- Second-team All-Big East (2012)

Career NFL statistics
- Total tackles: 132
- Forced fumbles: 1
- Pass deflections: 28
- Interceptions: 4
- Stats at Pro Football Reference

Blidi Bertrand Wreh-Wilson (/ˈbliːdi ˈreɪ/ BLEE-dee RAY; born December 5, 1989) is an American former professional football player who was a cornerback in the National Football League (NFL). He was selected by the Tennessee Titans in the third round of the 2013 NFL draft. He played college football for the UConn Huskies.

Wreh-Wilson played for the Titans for three seasons, primarily in a reserve role except in 2014. After being released by the Titans after the 2015 season, he then spent the next five seasons with the Atlanta Falcons where he remained in a backup role until 2020. In 2021, he had an offseason stint with the Las Vegas Raiders before playing in one regular season game for the Tampa Bay Buccaneers.

== Early life ==
Blidi attended General McLane High School in Edinboro, Pennsylvania, where he was a four-sport star in football, basketball, track and soccer. He played for the General McLane Lancers high school football team and for General McLane's 2007 PIAA AAA Basketball State Championship team, which in the same year won the PIAA AAA Football State Championship. This made General McLane the first high school in PIAA history to accomplish such a feat. Wreh-Wilson was not on the football team as he was on the soccer team. Switching fall sports in his senior year from soccer to football, Wreh-Wilson was an honorable mention all-state pick as a senior. Rated only a two-star recruit by Rivals, he committed to Connecticut over an offer from Buffalo. In track, he ran the 100-meter dash in 11.4 seconds, and the 400-meter dash in 51.03 seconds.

== College career ==
While attending the University of Connecticut, Wreh-Wilson played for the Connecticut Huskies football team from 2008 to 2012.

After being redshirted in 2008, Wreh-Wilson saw action in all 13 games of the 2009 season. He started nine games, including the final seven games of the season, and recorded a total of 40 tackles and one interception.

Wreh-Wilson started all 13 games for the Huskies at the cornerback position in 2010. He had four interceptions on the season, two of which were returned for touchdowns, and also recorded 57 tackles, five pass deflections, and one fumble recovery.

In the 2011 season, Wreh-Wilson only played in eight games due to a knee injury, but managed to start all eight games, and recorded 37 tackles, including two for a loss, along with two interceptions and seven pass deflections.

As a senior in 2012, Wreh-Wilson played in and started 11 games, and was honored as the team's Most Valuable Player. He was also a second-team All-Big East selection and recorded 47 tackles, nine pass deflections, and an interception.

== Professional career ==
Pre-draft measurables
Height	Weight	Arm length	Hand span	40-yard dash	10-yard split	20-yard split	20-yard shuttle	Three-cone drill	Vertical jump	Broad jump	Bench press
6 ft 0 3/4 in (1.85 m)	195 lb (88 kg)	32 in (0.81 m)	8 5/8 in (0.22 m)	4.53 s	1.57 s	2.52 s	4.12 s	6.97 s	36 in (0.91 m)	10 ft 8 in (3.25 m)	14 reps
All values from NFL Combine

=== Tennessee Titans ===
The Tennessee Titans chose Wreh-Wilson in the third round, with the 70th overall pick, of the 2013 NFL draft. He signed his four-year rookie contract with the Titans on June 20, 2013. As a rookie, he played in 13 games in a reserve role and contributed nine tackles, one tackle for loss, one pass defensed, and one forced fumble while adding five tackles and one forced fumble on special teams.

In 2014, Wreh-Wilson started 11 games at cornerback and ranked second on the team with 10 passes defensed. He recorded 57 tackles, an interception, and a quarterback pressure in the 2014 season.

On August 28, 2016, Wreh-Wilson was waived by the Titans.

=== Atlanta Falcons ===
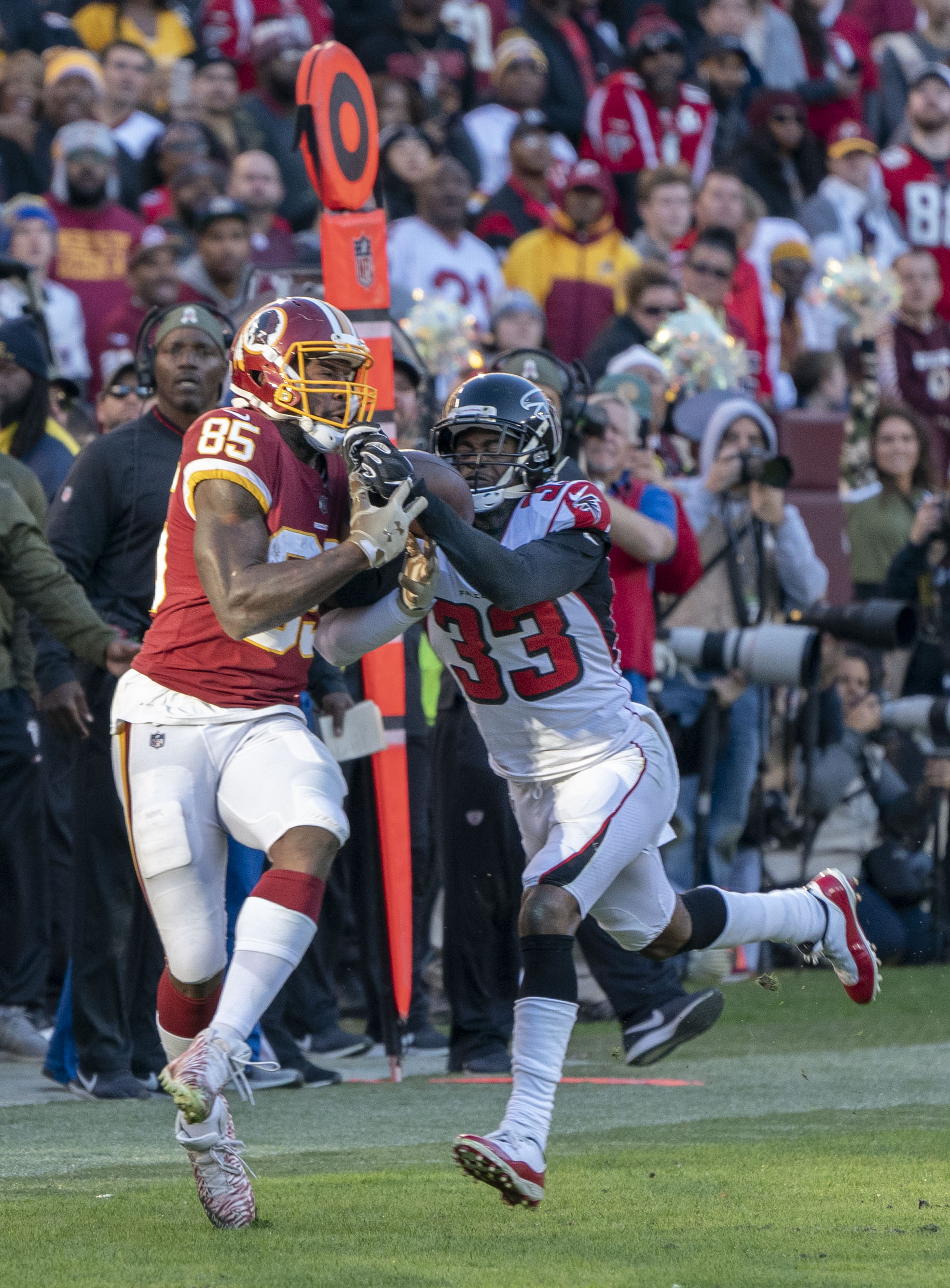
Wreh-Wilson (right) covering Vernon Davis in 2018

On November 29, 2016, Wreh-Wilson was signed by the Atlanta Falcons. He was released by the Falcons on December 9, 2016, but he was re-signed three days later. He was inactive for the Falcons' 34-28 overtime loss to the New England Patriots in the Super Bowl.

On March 10, 2017, Wreh-Wilson signed a one-year contract with the Falcons.

On March 10, 2018, Wreh-Wilson signed a one-year contract extension with the Falcons.

On February 22, 2019, Wreh-Wilson signed another one-year contract extension with the Falcons.

On March 31, 2020, Wreh-Wilson re-signed with the Falcons. In week 3 of the 2020 season against the Chicago Bears, he recorded his first interception as a Falcon during the 30–26 loss. In week 8, against the Carolina Panthers on Thursday Night Football, Wreh-Wilson intercepted a pass thrown by Teddy Bridgewater late in the fourth quarter to secure a 25–17 Falcons' victory.

=== Las Vegas Raiders ===
On June 9, 2021, Wreh-Wilson signed with the Las Vegas Raiders He was released on August 31.

=== Tampa Bay Buccaneers ===
On October 18, 2021, Wreh-Wilson was signed to the Tampa Bay Buccaneers' practice squad. He appeared in one game before he was released on January 18, 2022.

== NFL career statistics ==
Legend
**Bold**	Career high

=== Regular season ===
Year	Team	Games		Tackles					Interceptions					Fumbles			
Year	Team	GP	GS	Cmb	Solo	Ast	Sck	TFL	Int	Yds	TD	Lng	PD	FF	FR	Yds	TD
2013	TEN	13	0	13	9	4	0.0	**1**	0	0	0	0	1	**1**	0	0	0
2014	TEN	11	**11**	**57**	**48**	**9**	0.0	0	1	**34**	0	**34**	**10**	0	0	0	0
2015	TEN	10	3	20	19	1	0.0	0	0	0	0	0	3	0	0	0	0
2016	ATL	1	0	0	0	0	0.0	0	0	0	0	0	0	0	0	0	0
2017	ATL	8	1	4	3	1	0.0	0	0	0	0	0	1	0	0	0	0
2018	ATL	3	0	4	3	1	0.0	0	0	0	0	0	2	0	0	0	0
2019	ATL	14	2	25	21	4	0.0	0	0	0	0	0	7	0	0	0	0
2020	ATL	**15**	0	9	6	3	0.0	**1**	**3**	26	0	23	4	0	0	0	0
2021	TAM	1	0	0	0	0	0.0	0	0	0	0	0	0	0	0	0	0
		76	17	132	109	23	0.0	2	4	60	0	34	28	1	0	0	0

=== Playoffs ===
Year	Team	Games		Tackles					Interceptions					Fumbles			
Year	Team	GP	GS	Cmb	Solo	Ast	Sck	TFL	Int	Yds	TD	Lng	PD	FF	FR	Yds	TD
2017	ATL	**2**	0	**1**	**1**	0	0.0	0	0	0	0	0	0	0	0	0	0
		2	0	1	1	0	0.0	0	0	0	0	0	0	0	0	0	0

== Personal life ==
Wreh-Wilson's parents are from Liberia. His father is of Kru descent.
