= Marcelis Branch =

American gridiron football player (born 1994)

Profile
- Position: Safety

Personal information
- Born: January 19, 1994 (age 32); Homestead, Florida
- Listed height: 5 ft 11 in (1.80 m)
- Listed weight: 195 lb (88 kg)

Career information
- High school: Miami Southridge (Miami, Florida)
- College: Robert Morris
- NFL draft: 2017: undrafted

Career history
- Atlanta Falcons (2017–2018)*; Pittsburgh Steelers (2019)*; Tampa Bay Vipers (2020); Calgary Stampeders (2021–2022)
- * Offseason or practice squad member only
- Stats at Pro Football Reference

Marcelis Branch (born January 19, 1994) is an American former professional football safety. He played college football at Robert Morris University.

== Professional career ==
=== Atlanta Falcons ===
Branch signed with the Atlanta Falcons as an undrafted free agent on May 1, 2017. He was waived by the Falcons on September 2, 2017, but was signed to the practice squad the next day. He signed a reserve/future contract with the Falcons on January 15, 2018.

On September 1, 2018, Branch was waived by the Falcons.

=== Pittsburgh Steelers ===
On January 16, 2019, Branch signed a reserve/future contract with the Pittsburgh Steelers. He was waived on August 31, 2019.

=== Tampa Bay Vipers ===
Branch was drafted in the 5th round during phase four in the 2020 XFL draft by the Tampa Bay Vipers. He had his contract terminated when the league suspended operations on April 10, 2020. Branch was selected by the Alphas of The Spring League during its player selection draft on October 12, 2020.

=== Calgary Stampeders ===
Branch signed with the Calgary Stampeders of the CFL on February 1, 2021.
