= Andreas Knappe =

Danish-born American football player (born 1991)

No. 73
- Position: Offensive tackle

Personal information
- Born: June 2, 1991 (age 35); Silkeborg, Denmark
- Listed height: 6 ft 8 in (2.03 m)
- Listed weight: 325 lb (147 kg)

Career information
- High school: Handelsskolen Silkeborg (Silkeborg, Denmark)
- College: Connecticut
- NFL draft: 2017: undrafted

Career history
- Atlanta Falcons (2017)*; Washington Redskins (2017)*; Indianapolis Colts (2017)*; Denver Broncos (2018–2019)*
- * Offseason or practice squad member only
- Stats at Pro Football Reference

Andreas Emil Knappe (born June 2, 1991) is a Danish-born former American football offensive tackle. He played college football at the University of Connecticut. He was the first Danish player to sign with an NFL team since kicker Morten Andersen.

== Early life ==
Knappe grew up in Silkeborg, Denmark and played team handball as a youth. He was also an archer on the Danish national team, but got tired of it. Knappe first began playing football at the age of 18 because a friend recommended it. After playing for a local team, Knappe joined football powerhouse Triangle Razorbacks of the Danish American Football Federation. He competed on the defensive line on the team that won the 2011 Mermaid Bowl. In 2012, he came to the United States to attend some football camps, and attracted the attention of coach Paul Pasqualoni at the University of Connecticut.

== College career ==
Knappe redshirted his first season at UConn, playing on the defensive line. He played in one game in 2013. In 2014 he played in 10 games, starting the final seven of the season at right tackle. After the season he was named to the 2014 American Athletic Conference All-Academic team. He started all 25 games his final two seasons. Knappe participated in the Goal Line Project, a charity in which he mentored inner-city middle school kids. He was on the 2015 watchlist for the Wuerffel Trophy, awarded to the best FBS player who combines community service with athletic achievement.

== Professional career ==
=== Atlanta Falcons ===
Knappe signed with the Atlanta Falcons as an undrafted free agent on May 1, 2017. He was waived by the Falcons on September 2, 2017.

=== Washington Redskins ===
On October 16, 2017, Knappe was signed to the Washington Redskins' practice squad. He was released by the Redskins on October 31, 2017.

=== Indianapolis Colts ===
On December 4, 2017, Knappe was signed to the Indianapolis Colts' practice squad.

=== Denver Broncos ===
On January 17, 2018, Knappe signed a reserve/future contract with the Denver Broncos. He was waived/injured on September 1, 2018, and was placed on injured reserve. He was released on September 7, 2018. He was re-signed to the practice squad on October 24, 2018. On January 2, 2019, Knappe was re-signed to reserve/future contract. He was waived on April 15, 2019.
