= Jalen Collins =

American football player (born 1993)

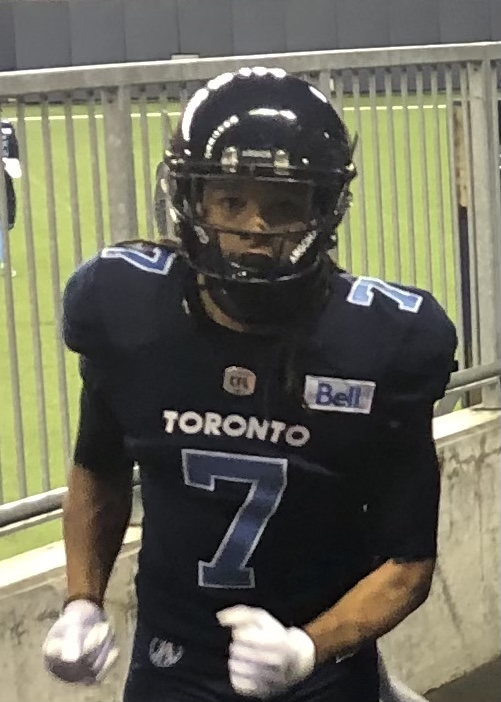
- Collins with the Toronto Argonauts in 2021

No. 32
- Position: Cornerback

Personal information
- Born: March 20, 1993 (age 33); Kansas City, Missouri, U.S.
- Listed height: 6 ft 1 in (1.85 m)
- Listed weight: 203 lb (92 kg)

Career information
- High school: Olive Branch (Olive Branch, Mississippi)
- College: LSU (2011–2014)
- NFL draft: 2015: 2nd round, 42nd overall pick

Career history
- Atlanta Falcons (2015–2017); Indianapolis Colts (2018–2019); Los Angeles Wildcats (2020)*; Tampa Bay Vipers (2020); Toronto Argonauts (2021–2022); Edmonton Elks (2022)
- * Offseason or practice squad member only

Career NFL statistics
- Total tackles: 48
- Forced fumbles: 1
- Fumble recoveries: 1
- Pass deflections: 10
- Interceptions: 2
- Stats at Pro Football Reference
- Stats at CFL.ca

Jalen Carnell Collins (born March 20, 1993), nicknamed "Snacks", is an American former professional football player who was a cornerback in the National Football League (NFL). He played college football for the LSU Tigers and was selected by the Atlanta Falcons in the second round of the 2015 NFL draft. Collins was also a member of the Indianapolis Colts, Los Angeles Wildcats, Tampa Bay Vipers, Toronto Argonauts, and Edmonton Elks.

== Early life ==
Collins played three seasons at DeSoto Central High School in Southaven, Mississippi, where he played football and ran track. He then transferred to Olive Branch High School for his senior season, in which he recorded 45 tackles, three interceptions and two blocked field goals. He was selected to play in the Mississippi-Alabama All-Star Classic. In track & field, Collins competed as a hurdler at DeSoto and posted personal-bests of 14.68 seconds in the 110 metres hurdles and 40.09 seconds in the 300 metres hurdles.

Considered a four-star recruit by Rivals.com, Collins was rated as the 22nd best cornerback prospect of his class. A member of Rivals.com Top 250. Rated the No. 249 prospect nationally and as the No. 22 cornerback by Rivals.com. Ranked No. 85 in the Press-Register Super Southeast120. Named to the Mississippi 6A First-team All-State by the Mississippi Association of Coaches. Named to the first-team All-State by the Clarion Ledger. He announced his commitment to LSU on July 27, 2010, after receiving a scholarship offer from the school one week before at a summer camp hosted by LSU.

== College career ==
Collins red-shirted as a true freshman. In 2012, he played in 13 games, and started one against Texas A&M, where he recorded an interception. He finished the season with 30 tackles, two interceptions, and eight pass break-ups. In 2013, Collins played in all 13 games, while starting two. He recorded 22 tackles and added two pass break-ups. In 2014, he earned a starting position for the Tigers. He recorded 33 tackles, with two for loss, one interception and nine pass break-ups.

Following the season, Collins announced that he would forgo his remaining eligibility and enter the 2015 NFL draft.

== Professional career ==
=== Pre-draft ===
Coming out of LSU, Collins was projected as a first-round pick by the majority of scouts and analysts. He was ranked the seventh best cornerback by NFLDraftScout.com, and ranked the second best cornerback by NFL analyst Mike Mayock. Five of six mock drafts from NFL Media analysts had Collins being drafted in the first round. Although he was coming off foot surgery, he was able to participate at the NFL Combine and completed most of the drills and workouts. On March 27, 2015, Collins was unable to workout at LSU's Pro Day due to the foot surgery. On April 24, less than a week before the draft, NFL Media analyst Albert Breer reported that he had sources from four teams with knowledge of multiple failed drug tests by Collins during his time at LSU. Before this, the New Orleans Saints and Pittsburgh Steelers were the two main teams to express serious interest in drafting him. NFL analyst Daniel Jeremiah projected Collins being selected in the second round, following the findings of the failed drug tests.

Pre-draft measurables
Height	Weight	Arm length	Hand span	Wingspan	40-yard dash	10-yard split	20-yard split	20-yard shuttle	Three-cone drill	Vertical jump	Broad jump
6 ft 1 1/2 in (1.87 m)	203 lb (92 kg)	32 1/8 in (0.82 m)	9 3/8 in (0.24 m)	6 ft 6 3/4 in (2.00 m)	4.48 s	1.61 s	2.63 s	4.27 s	6.77 s	36.0 in (0.91 m)	10 ft 4 in (3.15 m)
All values from NFL Combine

=== Atlanta Falcons ===
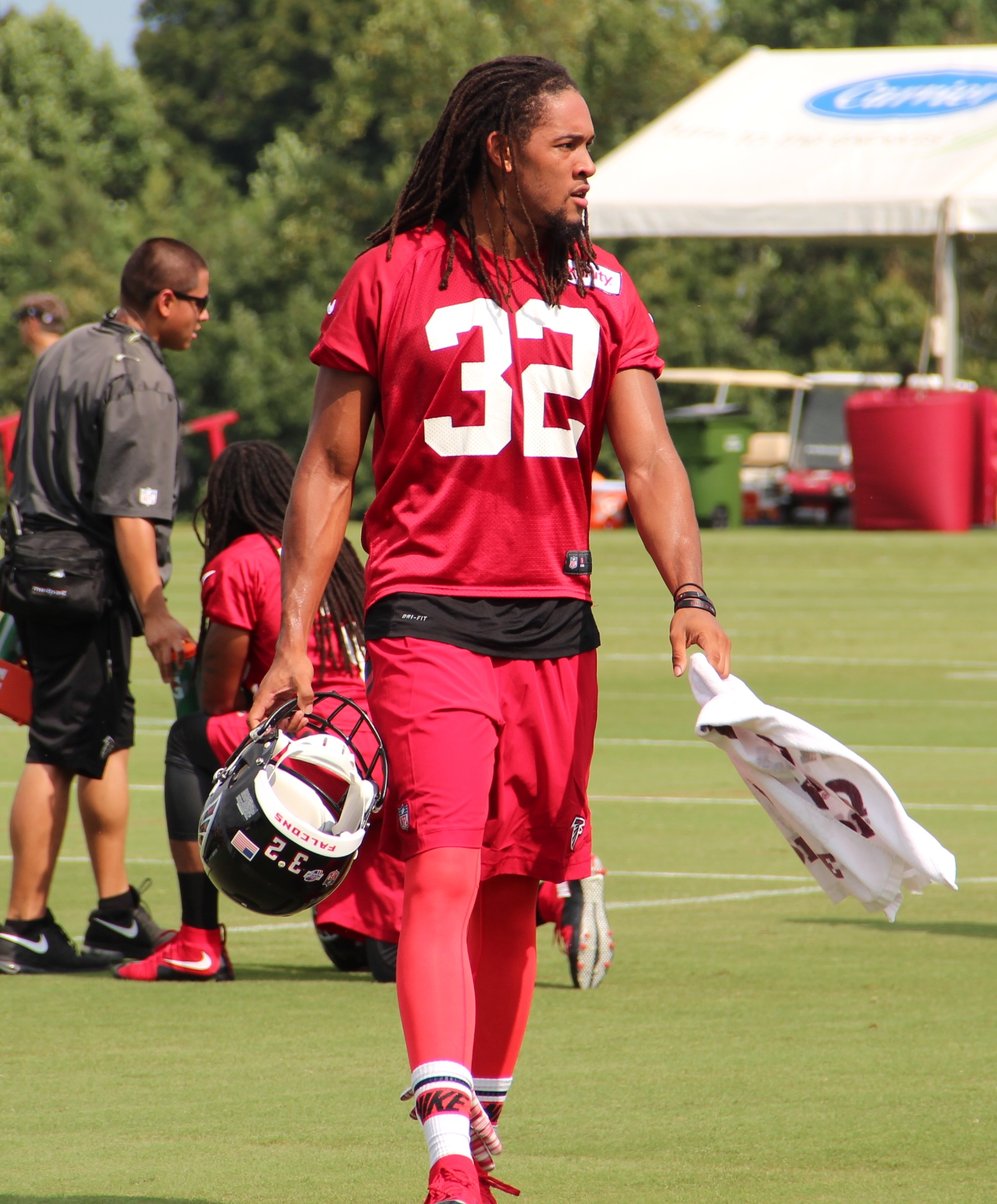
Collins with the Atlanta Falcons in 2015.

==== 2015 ====
The Atlanta Falcons selected Collins in the second round (42nd overall) of the 2015 NFL Draft. He was the fifth cornerback selected in the draft. On May 9, 2015, the Falcons signed Collins to a four-year, $5.42 million contract, with $2.88 million guaranteed and a signing bonus of $2.20 million.

Collins entered training camp competing with Robert Alford, Desmond Trufant and Phillip Adams for a starting cornerback position. Collins was named the fourth cornerback on the depth chart to begin the regular season behind Alford, Trufant, and Adams.

Collins made his professional regular season debut in the Falcons' season opener against the Philadelphia Eagles and made two solo tackles in the 26–24 victory on Monday Night Football. During a Week 7 matchup against the Tennessee Titans, Collins made his first career start in a 10–7 win. On November 8, he made his second career start and recorded a season-high five solo tackles during a 17–16 loss to the San Francisco 49ers. He finished his rookie season with 18 combined tackles, playing in 16 games with two starts.

==== 2016 ====
On April 8, 2016, Collins was suspended by the NFL for the first four games of the season for violating the league's policy on performance-enhancing substances.

On November 3, he recorded 2 solo tackles and a pass deflection in his season debut against the Tampa Bay Buccaneers, where the Falcons won 43–28.

Collins replaced Desmond Trufant in this game, when Trufant suffered a shoulder injury and was placed on injured reserve. He went on to replace Trufant for the remainder of the season and into post-season, after his season ended with a necessary surgery. In Week 10, Collins recorded six solo tackles in a 24–15 loss to the Eagles. The next game, he made six combined tackles and a season-high three pass deflections during a 38–19 victory over the Arizona Cardinals. On December 24, he had a season-high six solo tackles, two pass deflections, and intercepted quarterback Cam Newton for his first career interception. The Falcons routed the Carolina Panthers 33–16. On January 1, 2017, Collins made five solo tackles, three pass deflections, and made his second career interception on quarterback Drew Brees in a 38–32 win over the New Orleans Saints.

Collins finished the season with 31 combined tackles (28 solo), ten pass deflections, and two interceptions, playing in eight games with six starts. With the last two victories of the season, the Falcons managed to finish second in the National Football Conference (NFC), and first in the NFC South, with an 11–5 record. They would go on to face the winner of the Wild Card match-up between the Seahawks and the Detroit Lions.

On January 14, 2017, Collins appeared in his first career postseason game and recorded four solo tackles and a pass deflection in a 36–20 NFC Divisional game victory over the Seattle Seahawks. In the NFC Conference Championship on January 22, he made a key forced fumble in the second quarter after he stripped the ball away from the Green Bay Packers' fullback Aaron Ripkowski. Collins recovered the ball, which started a drive resulting in a touchdown, increasing the Falcons' lead to 24–0. He also made three combined tackles and a pass deflection, as the Falcons routed the Packers 44–21. In Super Bowl LI against the New England Patriots, Collins had a team-high eleven total tackles in their 34–28 loss.

==== 2017 ====
Collins was suspended for the first 10 games of the 2017 season for his second career violation of the NFL's policy on performing enhancing substances. On November 21, 2017, Collins was released by the Falcons, after being reinstated from his suspension.

On December 7, despite being unclaimed on waivers and not signing with another team, he faced his third career suspension, being suspended for 4 more games due to unspecified reasons.

==== 2018 ====
On April 9, 2018, Collins was suspended for the fourth time in his career, related to violating the league's substance abuse and performance-enhancing substances policies, and received another ten-game suspension.

=== Indianapolis Colts ===
On November 15, 2018, Collins, after being reinstated from his lengthy suspension, was signed to the practice squad of the Indianapolis Colts. He was promoted to the active roster on December 29, but was waived two days later and re-signed to the practice squad. He signed a future/reserve contract on January 13, 2019.

On August 31, Collins was again waived during final cuts by the Colts and signed to the practice squad the next day. He was released on September 30, with fellow CB Shakial Taylor signed as his replacement on the practice squad.

=== Los Angeles Wildcats ===
On November 22, 2019, Collins was selected by the Los Angeles Wildcats of the XFL in the 2020 XFL Supplemental Draft.

=== Tampa Bay Vipers ===
On December 17, 2019, Collins was traded to the Tampa Bay Vipers in exchange for Arrion Springs. Collins was waived on March 3, 2020.

=== Toronto Argonauts ===
On October 1, 2021, it was announced that Collins had signed with the Toronto Argonauts of the Canadian Football League (CFL). He dressed for his first CFL game on October 22, against the Montreal Alouettes, where he had four defensive tackles.

=== Edmonton Elks ===
The Edmonton Elks traded for Collins just before the 2022 CFL season, acquiring him and Martez Ivey from the Argonauts, in exchange for the Elks' 2023 sixth-round draft pick (pick 47, wide receiver Richard Burton.) Collins saw play for all six of Edmonton's games, recording 12 defensive tackles, as well as scoring a touchdown on a fumble recovery. He was released on July 17, 2022.

== Personal life ==
Collins is a co-host of the Raw Room podcast.
