= Olive Branch High School (Olive Branch, Mississippi) =

Location
- 9366 Sandidge Road; Olive Branch, Mississippi 38654; United States; 34.9495°N 89.8227°W

Information
- Type: Public high school
- Established: 1970
- School district: DeSoto County School District
- Principal: Jacob Stripling
- Teaching staff: 76.13 (on an FTE basis)
- Grades: 9–12
- Enrollment: 1,058 (2024–2025)
- Student to teacher ratio: 13.90
- Colors: Blue, gold and white
- Team name: Conquistadors
- Accreditation: Southern Association of Colleges and Schools
- Website: obh.desotocountyschools.org

Olive Branch High School is a suburban public high school in Olive Branch, Mississippi, United States, part of the Memphis metropolitan area. Its mascot is a conquistador and its school colors are blue, gold, and white. Olive Branch is a part of the DeSoto County School District.

== History ==
=== Original Olive Branch High School ===
Although the town of Olive Branch was extremely small for much of the 20th century, with a population of about 400 during the 1930s, newspaper records indicate the existence of a high school in the town no later than 1936. At that time the school had approximately 120 students, implying that students from outside city limits also attended.

In the era of formalized racial segregation in Mississippi, it appears there were both black and white high schools in Olive Branch.

=== Integration ===
Today's Olive Branch High School was established in 1970 after amalgamating Olive Branch High School and East Side High School. The school's mascot — the Conquistador — was chosen because "it was neither black nor white. It was seen as a conqueror to overcome the racial segregation of the past."

The high school moved into its new and current building in 1996.

== Athletics ==
=== Teams ===
Olive Branch's athletic teams are nicknamed the Conquistadors and the school's colors are white, gold, and blue. Olive Branch teams compete in the following sports:

- Baseball
- Basketball
- Bowling
- Cross Country
- Football
- Golf
- Powerlifting
- Soccer
- Softball
- Swimming
- Tennis
- Track and Field
- Volleyball
- Wrestling

=== State championships ===
Football

- 2011 Mississippi 6A State Champions

Basketball

- 2018 Mississippi 5A State Champions

Marching Band

- 2024 Mississippi 6A State Champions

== Notable alumni ==
- Daren Bates, NFL linebacker
- Shon Coleman, NFL offensive tackle
- Jalen Collins, NFL cornerback
- Ed Easley, MLB catcher
- Xavier Hill, NFL offensive lineman
- D. J. Jeffries, college basketball player for Mississippi State
- Fabien Lovett, college football defensive tackle for Florida State
- Wynton McManis, CFL linebacker
- Jeff Walker, NFL offensive lineman
- K. J. Wright, NFL linebacker
