= Fabien Lovett =

American football player (born 1999)

No. 90 – Orlando Storm
- Position: Defensive tackle
- Roster status: Active

Personal information
- Born: December 5, 1999 (age 26); Olive Branch, Mississippi, U.S.
- Listed height: 6 ft 4 in (1.93 m)
- Listed weight: 316 lb (143 kg)

Career information
- High school: Olive Branch
- College: Mississippi State (2018–2019); Florida State (2020–2023)
- NFL draft: 2024: undrafted

Career history
- Kansas City Chiefs (2024)*; New England Patriots (2025)*; Orlando Storm (2026–present)
- * Offseason or practice squad member only
- Stats at Pro Football Reference

Fabien Abdual Lovett Sr. (born December 5, 1999) is an American professional football defensive tackle for the Orlando Storm of the United Football League (UFL). He played college football for the Mississippi State Bulldogs and the Florida State Seminoles. He was signed by the Chiefs as an undrafted free agent after the 2024 NFL draft.

== Early life ==
Lovett attended high school at Olive Branch High School. In Lovett's junior season, he amassed 86 tackles, 21 tackles for loss, three forced fumbles, and one sack. Coming out of high school, Lovett was rated as a three-star recruit and the number 32 defensive end. Lovett decided to commit to play college football for the Mississippi State Bulldogs.

== College career ==
=== Mississippi State ===
In Lovett's first season in 2018, he would redshirt and not appear in any games. In 2019, Lovett played in 13 games where he notched 19 tackles, tackles-for-loss (TFL), and a sack. After the conclusion of the 2019 season, Lovett decided to enter the NCAA transfer portal.

=== Florida State ===
Lovett decided to transfer to play for the Florida State Seminoles. In Lovett's first two seasons with the Seminoles in 2020 and 2021 he notched 42 tackles, 6 TFL, and 3 sacks. During the 2022 season, Lovett notched 10 tackles, 2 TFL, a sack, a pass deflection, and a forced fumble. During the 2023 season, Lovett tallied 22 tackles with 4 TFL and a sack. After the conclusion of the 2023 season, Lovett decided to declare for the 2024 NFL draft.

In his career with the Seminoles, Lovett played in 39 games with 18 starts, totaling 74 tackles, 12 TFL, 5 sacks, 4 pass deflections, and a forced fumble.

== Professional career ==
Pre-draft measurables
Height	Weight	Arm length	Hand span	Wingspan	40-yard dash	10-yard split	20-yard split	20-yard shuttle	Three-cone drill	Vertical jump	Broad jump	Bench press
6 ft 3 7/8 in (1.93 m)	314 lb (142 kg)	35 1/2 in (0.90 m)	10 3/8 in (0.26 m)	6 ft 11 1/8 in (2.11 m)	5.01 s	1.75 s	2.92 s	4.82 s	7.56 s	25.5 in (0.65 m)	8 ft 5 in (2.57 m)	26 reps
All values from NFL Combine/Pro Day

=== Kansas City Chiefs ===
Lovett was signed by the Kansas City Chiefs as an undrafted free agent after the 2024 NFL draft. He was waived on August 27, 2024, and re-signed to the practice squad. He signed a reserve/future contract on February 11, 2025.

On August 26, 2025, Lovett was waived by the Chiefs as part of final roster cuts.

=== New England Patriots ===
On August 28, 2025, Lovett signed a contract to join the New England Patriots' practice squad. He was released by New England on September 30. On November 18, Lovett re-signed with the practice squad. He was released on January 13, 2026.

=== Orlando Storm ===
On January 21, 2026, Lovett signed with the Orlando Storm of the United Football League (UFL).
