= Daren Bates =

American football player (born 1990)

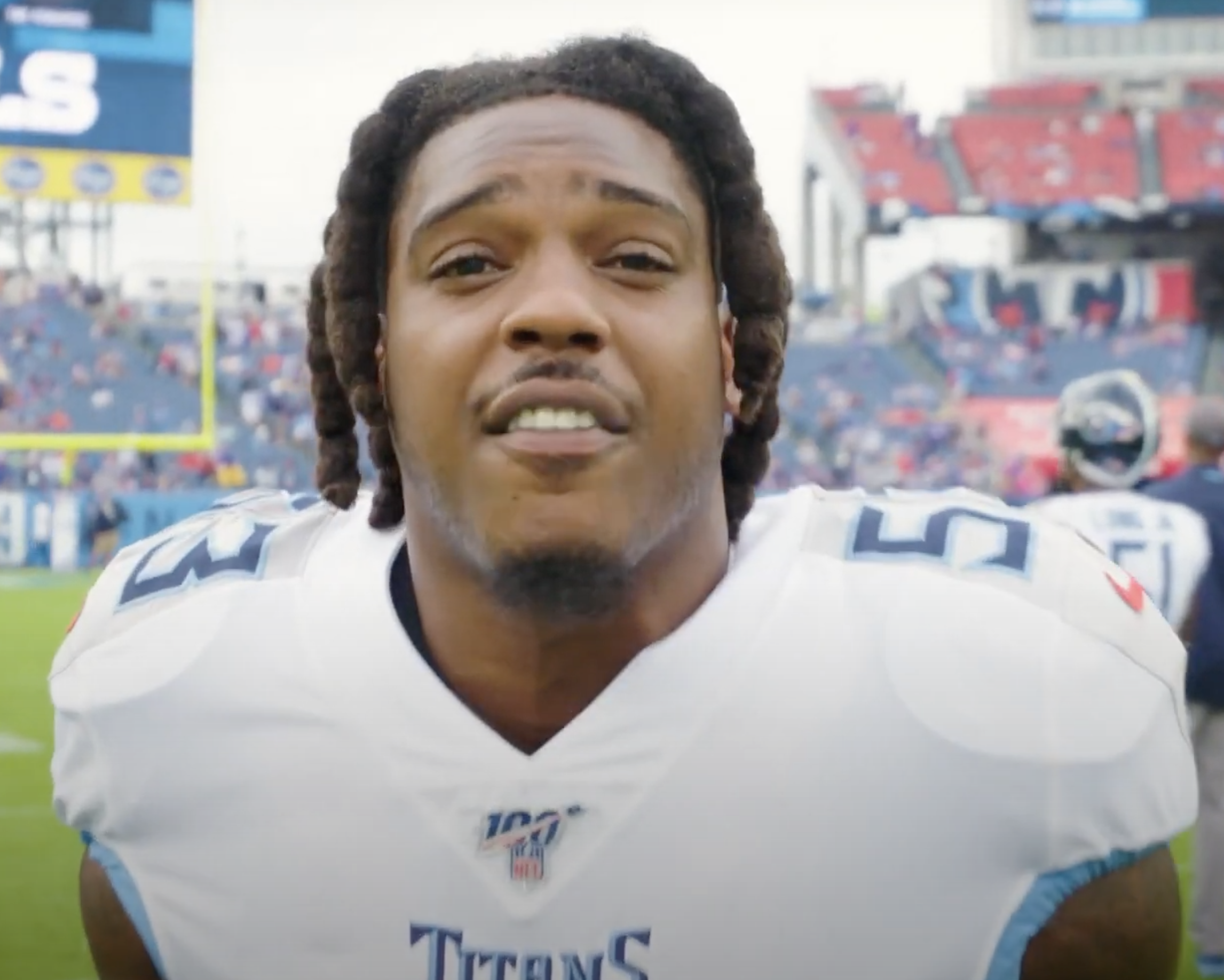
- Bates with the Tennessee Titans in 2019

Carolina Panthers
- Title: Assistant special teams coordinator

Personal information
- Born: November 27, 1990 (age 35); Memphis, Tennessee, U.S.
- Listed height: 5 ft 11 in (1.80 m)
- Listed weight: 225 lb (102 kg)

Career information
- Position: Linebacker (No. 53, 56)
- High school: Olive Branch (Olive Branch, Mississippi)
- College: Auburn
- NFL draft: 2013: undrafted

Career history

Playing
- St. Louis Rams (2013–2015); Oakland Raiders (2016); Tennessee Titans (2017–2019); Houston Texans (2020)*; Tennessee Titans (2020); Atlanta Falcons (2021)
- * Offseason or practice squad member only

Coaching
- Seattle Seahawks (2023) Assistant coach; Carolina Panthers (2024–present) Assistant special teams coordinator

Awards and highlights
- BCS national champion (2011)

Career NFL statistics
- Total tackles: 79
- Forced fumbles: 1
- Fumble recoveries: 3
- Defensive touchdowns: 1
- Stats at Pro Football Reference

Daren Weston Bates (born November 27, 1990) is an American former professional football linebacker and current assistant special teams coordinator for the Carolina Panthers. He played college football for the Auburn Tigers and was signed by the St. Louis Rams as an undrafted free agent in 2013. He has also played for the Oakland Raiders, Houston Texans, and Tennessee Titans. He previously coached for the Seattle Seahawks and is co-host of the Raw Room podcast.

== Early life ==
Bates played his freshman through junior year at Christian Brothers High School in Memphis, Tennessee. While there, Bates was a 2-time first-team Tennessee All-State safety. His senior year, Bates played at Olive Branch High School in Mississippi for coach Scott Samsel. He collected 90 tackles and four interceptions and had nearly 900 yards of total offense as a senior and was named MHSAA All-Region 1 Class 5A team.

== College career ==
In 2009, Bates was tied for 39th in the SEC in tackles per game, with 5.4. In 2009, he started all 13 games at safety and totaled 70 tackles with 2.5 tackles for loss and one fumble recovery. In 2010, he appeared in 12 games with nine starts and was 8th on team with 48 tackles. Bates was made the Freshman All SEC team and also was a second-team Freshman All American. Bates made his first collegiate start at linebacker in the season opener vs. Arkansas State after playing safety the previous years. In 2011 Bates started all 13 games and led the team with 104 tackles and was third on team with 8.5 tackles for loss (-30), 2.5 quarterback sacks (-15), and nine quarterback hurries. In 2012 Bates made 94 tackles (39) solo and 5.5 for losses he also batted away 4 passes and recovered 2 fumbles and intercepted a pass.

== Professional career ==
Pre-draft measurables
| Height | Weight | Arm length | Hand span | Wingspan | 40-yard dash | 10-yard split | 20-yard split | 20-yard shuttle | Three-cone drill | Vertical jump | Broad jump | Bench press |
|---|---|---|---|---|---|---|---|---|---|---|---|---|
| 5 ft 10 5/8 in (1.79 m) | 210 lb (95 kg) | 31 1/4 in (0.79 m) | 9 1/4 in (0.23 m) | 6 ft 4 3/8 in (1.94 m) | 4.53 s | 1.65 s | 2.68 s | 4.53 s | 7.28 s | 33.5 in (0.85 m) | 9 ft 9 in (2.97 m) | 15 reps |
All values from Auburn's Pro Day

=== St. Louis Rams ===
Bates was signed by the St. Louis Rams as an undrafted free agent and made the final 53-man squad on September 1, 2013. He has been used primarily as a special teams player for the Rams providing a valuable contribution. On October 13, against the Houston Texans, Bates returned a fumbled kickoff return for a touchdown to score the first touchdown of his career.

In a December 21, 2014 game against the New York Giants, Bates leaped over the Giants' long snapper during a field goal attempt and blocked the kick, which was recovered by Will Herring for the Rams.

On September 11, 2015, Bates was named one of the five captains for the 2015 season for the Rams, the first time in his career.

Bates registered back-to-back seasons (2014–2015) of double-digit special teams tackles.

=== Oakland Raiders ===
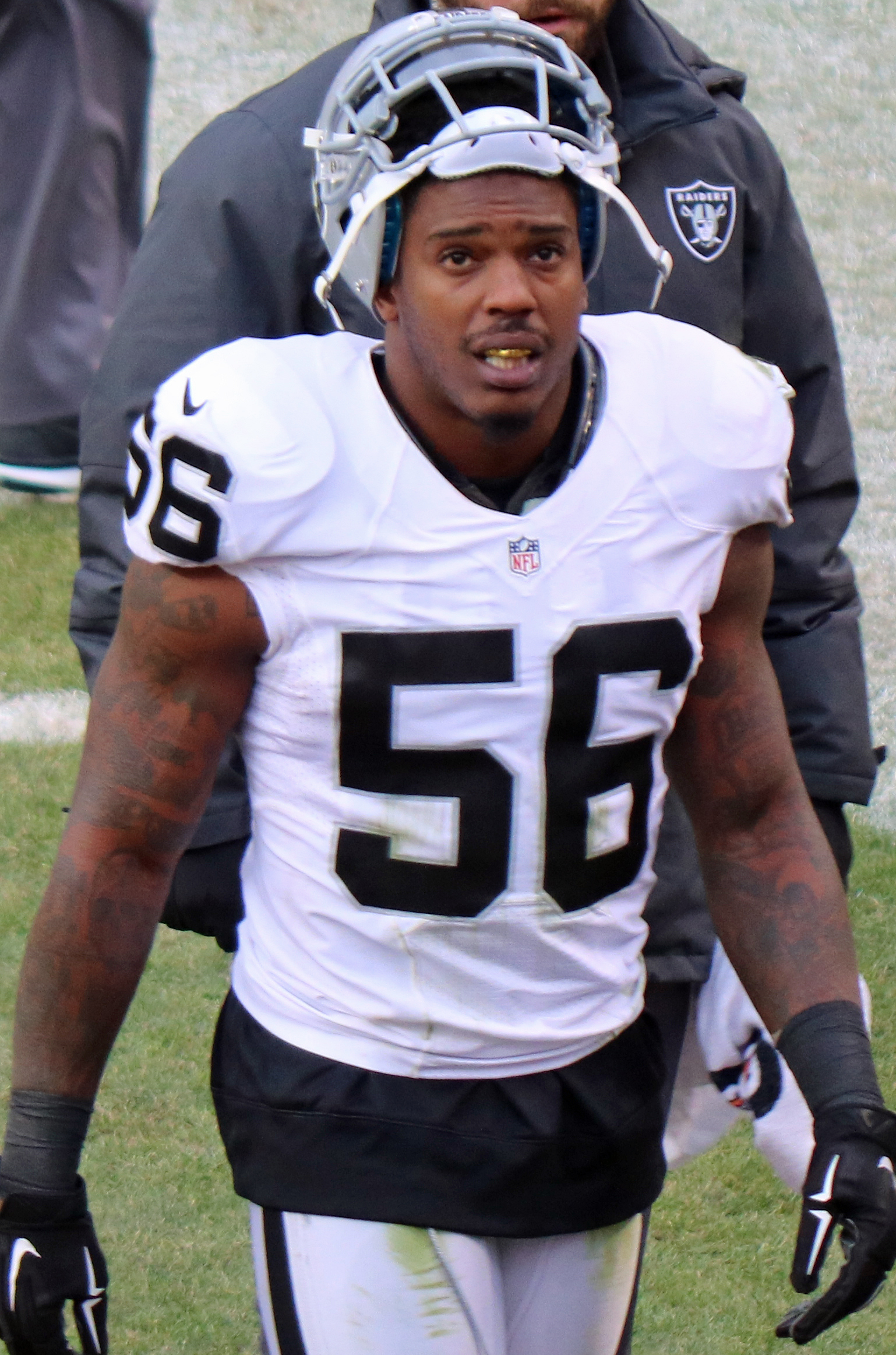
Bates with the Oakland Raiders in 2016

Bates signed with the Oakland Raiders on March 14, 2016. Bates made 16 appearances for Oakland, recording 12 combined tackles.

=== Tennessee Titans (first stint) ===
On March 10, 2017, Bates signed a three-year, $6 million contract with the Tennessee Titans. In 2017, Bates set a career–high and ranked second on the team with 16 special teams tackles.

On September 3, 2018, Bates was announced to be the special teams captain and tallied 10 special teams tackles.

=== Houston Texans ===
After becoming a free agent following the 2019 NFL season, Bates had a tryout with the Houston Texans on August 20, 2020. He signed with the team three days later. Bates was waived by the Texans as a part of final roster cuts on August 31.

=== Tennessee Titans (second stint) ===
On September 14, 2020, Bates was signed to the Tennessee Titans' practice squad. He was elevated to the active roster on October 13 and October 17 for the team's Weeks 5, 6, and 7 games against the Buffalo Bills, Houston Texans, and Pittsburgh Steelers, and reverted to the practice squad after each game. He was promoted to the active roster on October 27.

=== Atlanta Falcons ===
On October 18, 2021, Bates was signed to the Atlanta Falcons' practice squad. He was promoted to the active roster on November 2. Bates was placed on injured reserve on November 18. He was activated on December 25.
