= 2016–17 NFL playoffs =

American football tournament

- Dates: January 7 – February 5, 2017
- Season: 2016
- Teams: 12
- Games played: 11
- Super Bowl LI site: NRG Stadium; Houston, Texas
- Defending champions: Denver Broncos (did not qualify)
- Champion: New England Patriots (5th title)
- Runner-up: Atlanta Falcons
- Conference runners-up: Green Bay Packers; Pittsburgh Steelers
NFL playoffs
← 2015–16	2017–18 →

The National Football League playoffs for the 2016 NFL season began on Saturday, January 7, 2017. The postseason tournament concluded with Super Bowl LI on Sunday, February 5, 2017, when the New England Patriots defeated the Atlanta Falcons in overtime at NRG Stadium in Houston, Texas.

This was the first time since 2010 that the Cincinnati Bengals and Denver Broncos did not qualify for the playoffs and the first time since 2012 that the Carolina Panthers did not qualify for the playoffs.

The Oakland Raiders and Miami Dolphins made the playoffs for the first time since 2002 and 2008, respectively.

As of the 2025–26 playoffs, this is the last postseason in which the third and fourth seeds from both conferences all won a playoff game, the opposite outcome of the previous year when every wild-card team advanced to the second round.

This was the first postseason that the Super Bowl went into overtime, and the last until the 2023–24 playoffs.

== Participants ==
Within each conference, the four division winners and the top two non-division winners with the best overall regular season records) qualified for the playoffs. The four division winners are seeded 1–4 based on their overall won-lost-tied record, and the wild card teams are seeded 5–6. The NFL does not use a fixed bracket playoff system, and there are no restrictions regarding teams from the same division matching up in any round. In the first round, dubbed the wild-card playoffs or wild-card weekend, the third-seeded division winner hosts the sixth-seed wild card, and the fourth seed hosts the fifth. The 1 and 2 seeds from each conference received a first-round bye. In the second round, the divisional playoffs, the number 1 seed hosts the worst-surviving seed from the first round (seed 4, 5, or 6), while the number 2 seed will play the other team (seed 3, 4, or 5). The two surviving teams from each conference's divisional playoff games met in the respective AFC and NFC Conference Championship games, hosted by the higher seed. Although the Super Bowl, the championship round of the playoffs, is played at a neutral site, the designated home team is based on an annual rotation by conference.

Playoff seeds
Seed	AFC	NFC
1	New England Patriots (East winner)	Dallas Cowboys (East winner)
2	Kansas City Chiefs (West winner)	Atlanta Falcons (South winner)
3	Pittsburgh Steelers (North winner)	Seattle Seahawks (West winner)
4	Houston Texans (South winner)	Green Bay Packers (North winner)
5	Oakland Raiders (wild card)	New York Giants (wild card)
6	Miami Dolphins (wild card)	Detroit Lions (wild card)

== Bracket ==
Jan 8 – Heinz Field	Jan 15 – Arrowhead Stadium
6	Miami	12
3	Pittsburgh	18
3	Pittsburgh	30	Jan 22 – Gillette Stadium
2	Kansas City	16
AFC
Jan 7 – NRG Stadium	3	Pittsburgh	17
Jan 14 – Gillette Stadium
1	New England	36
5	Oakland	14	AFC Championship
4	Houston	16
4	Houston	27	Feb 5 – NRG Stadium
1	New England	34
Wild-card round
Divisional round
Jan 8 – Lambeau Field	A1	New England	34*
Jan 15 – AT&T Stadium
N2	Atlanta	28
5	NY Giants	13	Super Bowl LI
4	Green Bay	34
4	Green Bay	38	Jan 22 – Georgia Dome
1	Dallas	31
NFC
Jan 7 – CenturyLink Field	4	Green Bay	21
Jan 14 – Georgia Dome
2	Atlanta	44
6	Detroit	6	NFC Championship
3	Seattle	20
3	Seattle	26
2	Atlanta	36

* Indicates overtime victory

== Schedule ==
Round	Away team	Score	Home team	Date	Kickoff (ET / UTC−5)	TV	Viewers (millions)	TV rating
Wild-card round	Oakland Raiders	14–27	Houston Texans	January 7, 2017	4:35 p.m.	ABC/ESPN	25.1	14.4
Wild-card round	Detroit Lions	6–26	Seattle Seahawks	January 7, 2017	8:15 p.m.	NBC	26.9	14.8
Wild-card round	Miami Dolphins	12–30	Pittsburgh Steelers	January 8, 2017	1:05 p.m.	CBS	29.9	17.5
Wild-card round	New York Giants	13–38	Green Bay Packers	January 8, 2017	4:40 p.m.	Fox	39.3	21.3
Divisional round	Seattle Seahawks	20–36	Atlanta Falcons	January 14, 2017	4:35 p.m.	Fox	28.7	16.2
Divisional round	Houston Texans	16–34	New England Patriots	January 14, 2017	8:15 p.m.	CBS	29.8	16.0
Divisional round	Green Bay Packers	34–31	Dallas Cowboys	January 15, 2017	4:40 p.m.	Fox	48.5^{A}	26.1
Divisional round	Pittsburgh Steelers	18–16	Kansas City Chiefs	January 15, 2017	8:20 p.m.^{B}	NBC	37.1	19.8
Conference championships	Green Bay Packers	21–44	Atlanta Falcons	January 22, 2017	3:05 p.m.	Fox	46.3	25.0
Conference championships	Pittsburgh Steelers	17–36	New England Patriots	January 22, 2017	6:40 p.m.	CBS	48.0	24.4
Super Bowl LI NRG Stadium Houston, Texas	New England Patriots	34–28 (OT)	Atlanta Falcons	February 5, 2017	6:30 p.m.	Fox	111.3	45.3

A. The Green Bay-Dallas game was the most-watched early-round NFL playoff game on record.
B. The Pittsburgh-Kansas City game was rescheduled from a 1:05 p.m. kickoff due to public safety concerns about an ice storm affecting the Great Plains region. It thus became the first Divisional Playoff game ever played on Sunday night. The league subsequently used it as a test to consider whether to shift future Sunday playoff games into primetime, as moving games from the 1 p.m. afternoon slot potentially generates more viewers. Indeed, NBC, the broadcaster of the game, issued a press release on the following day that proclaimed that the contest was the "most-watched, highest-rated, primetime playoff game ever" in either the Wild Card or Divisional round. The league has resisted Sunday primetime games in the past because of the competitive disadvantage: if the winner was the lowest remaining seed, they would have to fly back home late Sunday night/early Monday and then travel again before their next game; while their opponent with home-field advantage might have played on Saturday, can stay at home for the next game and thus get extra time to prepare and rest.

== Wild-card round ==
=== Saturday, January 7, 2017 ===
==== AFC: Houston Texans 27, Oakland Raiders 14 ====
Oakland Raiders vs. Houston Texans – Game summary

Quarter	1	2	3	4	Total
Raiders	7	0	0	7	14
Texans	10	10	0	7	27

at NRG Stadium, Houston, Texas

- Date: January 7
- Game time: 4:35 p.m. EST/3:35 p.m. CST
- Game weather: None (retractable roof closed)
- Game attendance: 71,790
- Referee: Ronald Torbert
- TV announcers (ABC/ESPN): Sean McDonough, Jon Gruden, Lisa Salters and Adam Schefter
- Recap, Game Book

Game information

First quarter

- HOU – Nick Novak 50-yard field goal, 7:57. Texans 3–0. Drive: 4 plays, 8 yards, 1:52.
- HOU – Lamar Miller 4-yard run (Nick Novak kick), 6:16. Texans 10–0. Drive: 1 play, 4 yards, 0:04.
- OAK – Latavius Murray 2-yard run (Sebastian Janikowski kick), 1:01. Texans 10–7. Drive: 5 plays, 38 yards, 1:55.

Second quarter

- HOU – Nick Novak 38-yard field goal, 8:43. Texans 13–7. Drive: 10 plays, 75 yards, 4:26.
- HOU – DeAndre Hopkins 2-yard pass from Brock Osweiler (Nick Novak kick), 1:20. Texans 20–7. Drive: 4 plays, 60 yards, 1:05.

Third quarter

- No scoring plays.

Fourth quarter

- HOU – Brock Osweiler 1-yard run (Nick Novak kick), 12:28. Texans 27–7. Drive: 7 plays, 53 yards, 2:49.
- OAK – Andre Holmes 8-yard pass from Connor Cook (Sebastian Janikowski kick), 8:10. Texans 27–14. Drive: 11 plays, 75 yards, 4:18.

Top passers

- OAK – Connor Cook – 18/45, 161 yards, TD, 3 INT
- HOU – Brock Osweiler – 14/25, 168 yards, TD

Top rushers

- OAK – Latavius Murray – 12 rushes, 39 yards, TD
- HOU – Lamar Miller – 31 rushes, 73 yards, TD

Top receivers

- OAK – Andre Holmes – 4 receptions, 50 yards, TD
- HOU – DeAndre Hopkins – 5 receptions, 67 yards, TD

The Raiders were one of the most dominant teams in the AFC during the season, but in the final two weeks of the regular season, they lost starting quarterback Derek Carr and second-string quarterback Matt McGloin to injuries. The Raiders lost the last game and ended up going into the playoffs with Connor Cook under center, making Cook the first quarterback in the Super Bowl era to make his first NFL start in the postseason. Houston also had plenty of problems during the season as well, scoring only 25 touchdowns, the lowest number by a playoff team since the NFL expanded to a 16-game season in 1978. But in this game, they proved more than a match for the Raiders, holding them to just 202 total yards and 2-for-16 on third down conversions while scoring 27 points, without losing any turnovers or allowing any sacks.

Early in the first quarter, Shane Lechler's 30-yard punt pinned the Raiders back at their own 7-yard line. Oakland gained only two yards on their ensuing drive and Marquette King's 31-yard punt gave the Texans excellent field position on the Raiders' 40-yard line, which they converted on a Nick Novak field goal from 50 yards. Three plays into Oakland's next drive, Houston lineman Jadeveon Clowney intercepted a screen pass from Cook and returned it three yards, with an unnecessary roughness penalty on Menelik Watson adding another 15 yards and giving the Texans a first down on Oakland's 4-yard line. Lamar Miller then scored on a 4-yard touchdown run to give Houston a 10–0 lead with just over six minutes left in the first quarter. Both teams had to punt on their next possession and Jalen Richard returned Lechler's 51-yard kick 37 yards to the Texans' 38-yard line. Latavius Murray then rushed four times for 31 yards as the team drove to a touchdown on his 2-yard run, cutting the deficit to 10–7.

In the second quarter, Houston quarterback Brock Osweiler completed passes to tight end C. J. Fiedorowicz for yardage gains of 18 and 17 yards, respectively, while Miller added a 19-yard carry as the team drove 75 yards in 10 plays to score on Novak's 38-yard field goal, making the score 13–7. Later on, the Texans got the ball on their own 40-yard line with 2:25 left in the half. Osweiler completed a 19-yard pass to Will Fuller and a 38-yard pass to DeAndre Hopkins, then finished the drive with a 2-yard touchdown pass to Hopkins that gave his team a 20–7 halftime lead. The third quarter started with six consecutive punts. With 28 seconds left in the period, Houston returner Tyler Ervin muffed King's 56-yard punt, but teammate Eddie Pleasant recovered the ball and returned it 12 yards to the Texans' 47-yard line. Houston then drove 53 yards in nine plays, including a 19-yard reception by Fuller, to score on Osweiler's 1-yard touchdown run and go up 27–7. After being completely shut down up to this point, Oakland's offense finally managed to respond, moving the ball 75 yards in 11 plays, with Cook completing 5 of 9 passes for 50 yards on the drive; three completions went to Andre Holmes for 37 yards, the last one an 8-yard touchdown pass to make the score 27–14. Oakland's defense then forced a three-and-out with 6:27 left, but safety Corey Moore ended the drive with an interception of a high pass intended for Amari Cooper. Cook was intercepted again in the final two minutes, by A. J. Bouye.

Osweiler was 14-of-25 passing for 168 yards and a touchdown, while also rushing for 15 yards and a touchdown. Cornerback Johnathan Joseph had 10 solo tackles, while linebacker Whitney Mercilus had seven tackles (five solo) and two sacks. In his first start, Cook completed 18 of 45 passing attempts for 161 yards and a touchdown, with three interceptions.

This was the Raiders' final playoff game played while the team was based in Oakland, as they moved to Las Vegas in 2020.

==== NFC: Seattle Seahawks 26, Detroit Lions 6 ====
Detroit Lions vs. Seattle Seahawks – Game summary

Quarter	1	2	3	4	Total
Lions	0	3	3	0	6
Seahawks	0	10	0	16	26

at CenturyLink Field, Seattle, Washington

- Date: January 7
- Game time: 8:15 p.m. EST/5:15 p.m. PST
- Game weather: 38 °F (3 °C), cloudy
- Game attendance: 68,788
- Referee: Brad Allen
- TV announcers (NBC): Al Michaels, Cris Collinsworth, Michele Tafoya and Heather Cox
- Recap, Game Book

Game information

First quarter

- No scoring plays.

Second quarter

- SEA – Paul Richardson 2-yard pass from Russell Wilson (Steven Hauschka kick), 7:07. Seahawks 7–0. Drive: 14 plays, 60 yards, 7:45.
- SEA – Steven Hauschka 43-yard field goal, 1:55. Seahawks 10–0. Drive: 7 play, 51 yards, 2:53.
- DET – Matt Prater 51-yard field goal, 0:20. Seahawks 10–3. Drive: 7 play, 42 yards, 1:35.

Third quarter

- DET – Matt Prater 53-yard field goal, 4:03. Seahawks 10–6. Drive: 10 play, 61 yards, 5:33.

Fourth quarter

- SEA – Steven Hauschka 27-yard field goal, 14:12. Seahawks 13–6. Drive: 10 play, 66 yards, 4:51.
- SEA – Thomas Rawls 4-yard run (kick failed, hit right upright), 8:49. Seahawks 19–6. Drive: 8 plays, 82 yards, 4:08.
- SEA – Doug Baldwin 13-yard pass from Russell Wilson (Steven Hauschka kick), 3:36. Seahawks 26–6. Drive: 11 plays, 84 yards, 4:15.

Top passers

- DET – Matthew Stafford – 18/32, 205 yards
- SEA – Russell Wilson – 23/30, 224 yards, 2 TD

Top rushers

- DET – Zach Zenner – 11 rushes, 34 yards
- SEA – Thomas Rawls – 27 rushes, 161 yards, TD

Top receivers

- DET – Marvin Jones – 4 receptions, 81 yards
- SEA – Doug Baldwin – 11 receptions, 104 yards, TD

Seattle dominated the Lions, holding them to just 231 total yards, 13 first downs and 2-for-11 on third down conversions.

All drives in the first quarter ended in punts, except for the last one in which the Lions drove to a 4th-and-1 situation on the Seattle 38-yard line. On the first play of the second quarter, Matthew Stafford completed a pass to tight end Matthew Mulligan, but linebackers Bobby Wagner and K. J. Wright tackled him for a two-yard loss, causing a turnover on downs. Seattle then drove 60 yards in 14 plays, nine of them rushes by Thomas Rawls for 49 yards. Faced with 4th-and-goal on the Lions' 2-yard line, quarterback Russell Wilson threw the ball to Paul Richardson, who made a diving one-handed catch in the back of the end zone despite tight coverage (and a pass interference penalty) by safety Tavon Wilson, giving Seattle a 7–0 lead. Following a punt by the Lions, Rawls' 26-yard run and Wilson's 19-yard completion to Richardson set up Steven Hauschka's 43-yard field goal, increasing Seattle's lead to 10–0. Getting the ball with 1:55 left on the clock, Detroit responded as Stafford's completions to Anquan Boldin and Marvin Jones for gains of 16 and 30 yards led to a 51-yard Matt Prater field goal that made the score 10–3 with 20 seconds left before halftime.

After forcing Seattle to punt on the opening drive of the second half, Stafford led the Lions 61 yards in 10 plays, featuring a 23-yard completion to fullback Zach Zenner, to score on Prater's 53-yard field goal, cutting their deficit to 10–6. But after this, Seattle completely took over the game. They responded by driving 65 yards in 10 plays, including a 32-yard run by Rawls, scoring on Hauschka's 27-yard field goal three plays into the fourth quarter. Then after a punt, Wilson's 42-yard completion to Doug Baldwin initiated an 82-yard drive that ended on Rawls' four-yard touchdown run, making the score 19–6 after Hauschka missed the extra point. Another Detroit punt got them the ball back with less than eight minutes remaining and they went on to put the game away with an 11-play, 84-yard drive. The key play was Wilson's 27-yard completion to Richardson on 3rd-and-5 from the Seattle 33-yard line. Wilson eventually finished the drive with a 13-yard touchdown pass to Baldwin, making the final score 26–6.

Wilson completed 23 of 30 passes for 224 yards and a pair of touchdowns. His top target was Baldwin, who caught 11 passes for 104 yards and a touchdown. Rawls set a franchise playoff record with 161 yards and a touchdown on 27 carries. Defensive end Cliff Avril had three tackles and two sacks. For the Lions, Stafford completed 18 of 32 passes for 205 yards; Jones caught four passes for 81 yards while defensive end Ezekiel Ansah had nine combined tackles (five solo) and two sacks. Prater made NFL history with two field goals greater than 50 yards in a playoff game.

=== Sunday, January 8, 2017 ===
==== AFC: Pittsburgh Steelers 30, Miami Dolphins 12 ====
Miami Dolphins vs. Pittsburgh Steelers – Game summary

Quarter	1	2	3	4	Total
Dolphins	3	3	0	6	12
Steelers	14	6	10	0	30

at Heinz Field, Pittsburgh, Pennsylvania

- Date: January 8
- Game time: 1:05 p.m. EST
- Game weather: 17 °F (−8 °C), partly cloudy
- Game attendance: 62,726
- Referee: Craig Wrolstad
- TV announcers (CBS): Jim Nantz, Phil Simms, Tracy Wolfson and Jay Feely
- Recap, Game Book

Game information

First quarter

- PIT – Antonio Brown 50-yard pass from Ben Roethlisberger (Chris Boswell kick), 12:15. Steelers 7–0. Drive: 5 plays, 85 yards, 2:45.
- PIT – Antonio Brown 62-yard pass from Ben Roethlisberger (Chris Boswell kick), 6:50. Steelers 14–0. Drive: 6 plays, 90 yards, 3:10.
- MIA – Andrew Franks 38-yard field goal, 3:06. Steelers 14–3. Drive: 7 play, 39 yards, 3:44.

Second quarter

- PIT – Le'Veon Bell 1-yard run (kick failed, hit right upright), 12:39. Steelers 20–3. Drive: 10 plays, 83 yards, 5:27.
- MIA – Andrew Franks 47-yard field goal, 4:52. Steelers 20–6. Drive: 12 play, 39 yards, 7:47.

Third quarter

- PIT – Chris Boswell 34-yard field goal, 6:32. Steelers 23–6. Drive: 8 play, 43 yards, 4:16.
- PIT – Le'Veon Bell 8-yard run (Chris Boswell kick), 2:05. Steelers 30–6. Drive: 7 plays, 25 yards, 4:18.

Fourth quarter

- MIA – Damien Williams 4-yard pass from Matt Moore (pass failed), 5:57. Steelers 30–12. Drive: 9 plays, 70 yards, 4:20.

Top passers

- MIA – Matt Moore – 29/36, 289 yards, TD, INT
- PIT – Ben Roethlisberger – 13/18, 197 yards, 2 TD, 2 INT

Top rushers

- MIA – Jay Ajayi – 16 rushes, 33 yards
- PIT – Le'Veon Bell – 29 rushes, 167 yards, 2 TD

Top receivers

- MIA – Jarvis Landry – 11 receptions, 102 yards
- PIT – Antonio Brown – 5 receptions, 124 yards, 2 TD

In their regular season meeting, Miami racked up 474 yards as they defeated Pittsburgh 30–15, but this game would have a very different outcome. The Steelers gained 387 yards, forced three turnovers, recorded five sacks and scored three touchdowns in the first half on the way to a dominant 18-point win.

Pittsburgh took the opening kickoff and drove 85 yards in 5 plays, scoring on Ben Roethlisberger's pass to Antonio Brown, who hauled in the short screen and took it 50 yards to the end zone. Then after a punt, the Steelers moved the ball 90 yards in 6 plays on the way to a 62-yard touchdown completion from Roethlisberger to Brown. This time Miami managed to respond, aided by Kenyan Drake's 33-yard kickoff return to the 41-yard line. Faced with 3rd-and-13 after two plays, Matt Moore completed a 36-yard pass to receiver Kenny Stills, setting up Andrew Franks' 38-yard field goal that cut their deficit to 14–3. But after getting the ball back, Steelers running back Le'Veon Bell carried the ball 9 times for 79 yards on a 10–play, 83-yard drive that ended with his 1-yard touchdown run, giving the team a 20–3 lead after Chris Boswell missed the extra point.

Miami then drove 39 yards in 12 plays, scoring on Franks' 47-yard field goal with less than 5 minutes left in the second quarter. Pittsburgh responded with a drive to the Dolphins' 34-yard line, but with 1:12 left, Roethlisberger threw a pass that bounced off the outstretched hands of Brown and was intercepted by safety Michael Thomas, who returned it 16 yards to the Dolphins' 27-yard line. Miami subsequently moved the ball to the Steelers' 8-yard line, featuring a 37-yard completion from Moore to DeVante Parker. But on the next play, Moore lost a fumble while being sacked by James Harrison and Steelers defensive end Stephon Tuitt recovered the ball, allowing Pittsburgh to go into the half maintaining their 20–6 lead.

Early in the third quarter, safety Mike Mitchell forced a fumble while sacking Moore that Leterrius Walton recovered for the Steelers at their 41-yard line. Bell then rushed 3 times for 49 yards on the way to a 34-yard Boswell field goal that increased their lead to 23–6. Then on the first play after the kickoff, linebacker Ryan Shazier intercepted a pass from Moore and returned it 10 yards to the Dolphins' 25-yard line. Miami's defense managed to force a 4th down, but a neutral zone infraction penalty against Dolphins defensive back Tony Lippett on the field goal attempt gave Pittsburgh a new set of downs. The Steelers took full advantage of the opportunity, scoring on Bell's 8-yard touchdown run that made the score 30–6 with 2 minutes left until the fourth quarter. Miami responded with a drive to the Steelers' 42-yard line, but lost the ball when Tuitt tackled Moore for a 2-yard gain on 4th-and-4.

Miami finally managed to get a touchdown in the fourth quarter—with 5:57 left—moving the ball 70 yards in 9 plays and scoring on Moore's 4-yard pass to running back Damien Williams. After a failed onside kick attempt, the Dolphins got one last chance to score when Xavien Howard intercepted Roethlisberger's pass and returned it 11 yards to the Miami 43-yard line. But the Steelers forced a turnover on downs at the Steelers' 33-yard line and ran out the clock to win the game.

Roethlisberger completed 13 of 18 passes for 197 yards and two touchdowns, with 2 interceptions. Brown caught 5 passes for 124 yards and two scores, while Bell rushed 29 times for 167 yards—surpassing the previous franchise playoff record of 158 yards set by Franco Harris in Super Bowl IX—and a touchdown. Linebacker Lawrence Timmons had 14 tackles (8 solo) and 2 sacks. James Harrison had 10 tackles (6 solo), 1.5 sacks and a forced fumble. Moore finished with 29 completions on 36 passing attempts for 298 yards and a touchdown, with one interception. His top receiver was Jarvis Landry, who caught 11 passes for 102 yards. Another notable moment from this game was when Steelers linebacker Bud Dupree made a helmet to helmet hit on Matt Moore. He was called for a 15 yard penalty, and later fined $18,000.

==== NFC: Green Bay Packers 38, New York Giants 13 ====
New York Giants vs. Green Bay Packers – Game summary

Quarter	1	2	3	4	Total
Giants	3	3	7	0	13
Packers	0	14	10	14	38

at Lambeau Field, Green Bay, Wisconsin

- Date: January 8
- Game time: 4:40 p.m. EST/3:40 p.m. CST
- Game weather: 14 °F (−10 °C), clear
- Game attendance: 77,549
- Referee: Ed Hochuli
- TV announcers (Fox): Joe Buck, Troy Aikman, Erin Andrews and Chris Myers
- Recap, Game Book

Game information

First quarter

- NYG – Robbie Gould 26-yard field goal, 5:44. Giants 3–0. Drive: 9 play, 54 yards, 3:34.

Second quarter

- NYG – Robbie Gould 40-yard field goal, 7:24. Giants 6–0. Drive: 7 play, 70 yards, 2:47.
- GB – Davante Adams 5-yard pass from Aaron Rodgers (Mason Crosby kick), 2:20. Packers 7–6. Drive: 3 plays, 38 yards, 1:25.
- GB – Randall Cobb 42-yard pass from Aaron Rodgers (Mason Crosby kick), 0:00. Packers 14–6. Drive: 8 plays, 80 yards, 1:38.

Third quarter

- NYG – Tavarres King 41-yard pass from Eli Manning (Robbie Gould kick), 5:16. Packers 14–13. Drive: 2 plays, 41 yards, 0:45.
- GB – Randall Cobb 30-yard pass from Aaron Rodgers (Mason Crosby kick), 2:53. Packers 21–13. Drive: 4 plays, 63 yards, 2:23.
- GB – Mason Crosby 32-yard field goal, 0:21. Packers 24–13. Drive: 5 play, 23 yards, 1:29.

Fourth quarter

- GB – Randall Cobb 16-yard pass from Aaron Rodgers (Mason Crosby kick), 9:19. Packers 31–13. Drive: 10 plays, 80 yards, 5:14.
- GB – Aaron Ripkowski 1-yard run (Mason Crosby kick), 2:43. Packers 38–13. Drive: 9 plays, 55 yards, 5:48.

Top passers

- NYG – Eli Manning – 23/44, 299 yards, TD, INT
- GB – Aaron Rodgers – 25/40, 362 yards, 4 TD

Top rushers

- NYG – Paul Perkins – 10 rushes, 30 yards
- GB – Christine Michael – 10 rushes, 47 yards

Top receivers

- NYG – Tavarres King – 3 receptions, 73 yards, TD
- GB – Davante Adams – 8 receptions, 125 yards, TD

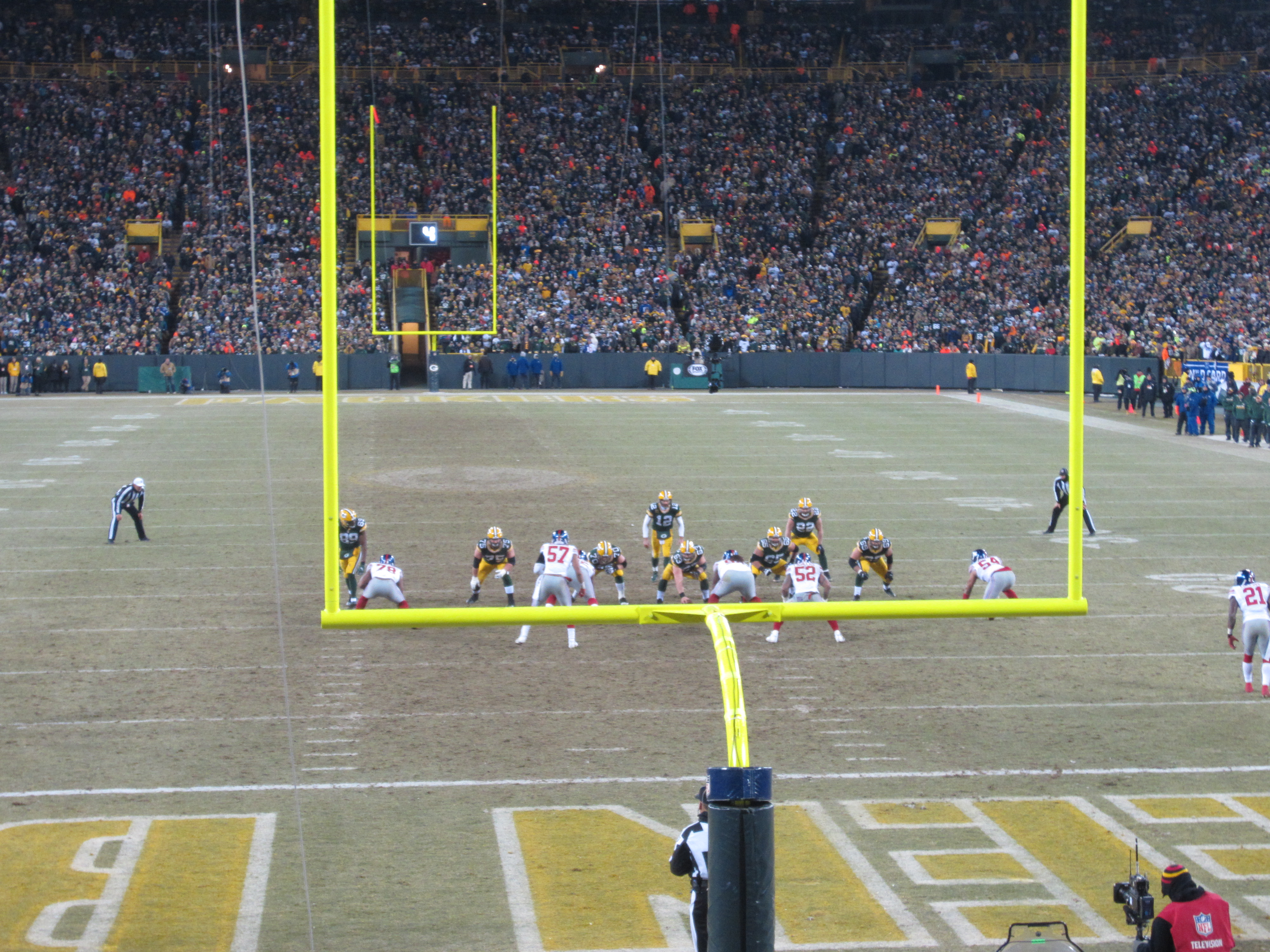
The Packers offense lining up against the Giants defense during the playoff game.

This was the first wild card game between two former Super Bowl MVP quarterbacks. The Packers got revenge on the Giants with a 38–13 blowout after losing to the Giants in 2007 and 2011. In the week leading up to the game, a photo surfaced on social of four Giants wide receivers: Odell Beckham, Jr., Roger Lewis, Sterling Shepard, and Victor Cruz, on vacation in Miami with rapper Trey Songz instead of practicing for the game. They were heavily criticized for this and many sources largely contributed it to the Giants' loss.

After the game started with a few punts, Giants quarterback Eli Manning completed passes to Sterling Shepard for gains of 26 and 13 yards as the team drove 54 yards to score on Robbie Gould's 26-yard field goal. Meanwhile, their defense would keep Green Bay pinned down for the entire first quarter, holding them to just 7 net yards. To make matters worse, Packers receiver Jordy Nelson, their leading receiver during the season, was injured and did not return to the game. New York also suffered a big loss through injury though, defensive back Dominique Rodgers-Cromartie, the team's regular season leader in interceptions.

In the second quarter, Green Bay punter Jake Schum pinned the Giants back at their 8-yard line with a 58-yard kick. A few plays later, Manning's 51-yard completion to tight end Will Tye set up another Gould field goal, increasing their lead to 6–0. Green Bay had to punt again on their next drive and once again they pinned the Giants back at their own 8-yard line with Schum's kick. This time, New York could not gain any net yards and safety Micah Hyde returned Brad Wing's 37-yard punt 7 yards to the Giants' 38-yard line. With excellent field position, the Packers' offense, that had been held in check all game, scored two touchdowns in the final 2:20 of the half. First, Aaron Rodgers completed a 31-yard pass to Davante Adams; then after a short running play, Rodgers threw the ball to Adams in the back left corner of the end zone, who made a diving catch past the outstretched arms of defensive back Coty Sensabaugh for a 5-yard touchdown reception. New York then had to punt in 3 plays after Bobby Rainey was stopped for no gain on 3rd-and-1. Taking the ball back on their own 20-yard line with 1:38 left, Green Bay used nearly all that time to drive to a 4th-and-2 on the Giants' 42-yard line. With six seconds left, Rodgers aired out a Hail Mary pass into the end zone, over the heads of numerous players and was caught by receiver Randall Cobb, giving the Packers a 14–6 halftime lead.

Following a pair of punts to start the second half, Green Bay found themselves facing 3rd-and-1 on their own 42-yard line. This time the Giants would make a defensive stand; fullback Aaron Ripkowski was stopped for no gain by safety Landon Collins, then Ty Montgomery tried to run left tackle, but Collins and linebacker Jonathan Casillas tackled him for a 1-yard loss. One play after the turnover on downs, Manning threw a 41-yard touchdown pass to receiver Tavarres King, putting the Giants within one point at 14–13. However, this was all New York could do as Green Bay went on a run of 24 unanswered points. Christine Michael returned the ensuing kickoff 31 yards to the 37-yard line. Then Rodgers hit Jared Cook for 13 yards, Adams for 20 yards and Cobb for a 30-yard touchdown pass that gave the team a 21–13 lead. New York then went three-and-out and Hyde returned Wing's 50-yard punt 23 yards to the Giants' 37-yard line. Rodgers' subsequent 23-yard completion to Adams set up Mason Crosby's 32-yard field goal, upping their lead to 24–13. Three plays into the fourth quarter, New York had to punt again. Green Bay went on to drive 80 yards in 10 plays and go up 31–13 on Rodgers' 16-yard touchdown pass to Cobb. The key play of the drive was a 34-yard reception by Montgomery on 3rd-and-10 from the Packers' 30-yard line.

Though the game was virtually over at this point, a few plays into New York's next drive, linebacker Clay Matthews III hit Manning as he was winding up for a pass. Since the ball went forward, both teams thought the result was an incomplete pass; Matthews realized no whistle had been blown and raced 10 yards downfield to recover the ball, plowing through running back Paul Perkins in the process. The ball was deemed live and was classed as a fumble recovery for Green Bay on the Packers' 45-yard line. Green Bay then drove 55 yards in 9 plays to make the final score 38–13 on Ripkowski's 1-yard touchdown run. New York responded with a drive to the Packers' 13-yard line, but Damarious Randall intercepted a pass from Manning with seconds remaining.

Rodgers completed 25 of 40 passes for 364 yards and four touchdowns. Cobb caught three touchdown passes out of five receptions, for 116 yards, while Adams had eight catches for 125 yards and a touchdown. Hyde had six tackles and five punt returns for 50 yards. For New York, Manning completed 23 of 44 passes for 299 yards, with a touchdown and an interception.

== Divisional round ==
=== Saturday, January 14, 2017 ===
==== NFC: Atlanta Falcons 36, Seattle Seahawks 20 ====
Seattle Seahawks vs. Atlanta Falcons – Game summary

Quarter	1	2	3	4	Total
Seahawks	7	3	3	7	20
Falcons	0	19	7	10	36

at Georgia Dome, Atlanta, Georgia

- Date: January 14
- Game time: 4:35 p.m. EST
- Game weather: Played indoors (domed stadium)
- Game attendance: 71,155
- Referee: Gene Steratore
- TV announcers (Fox): Kevin Burkhardt, John Lynch, Pam Oliver and Peter Schrager
- Recap, Game Book

Game information

First quarter

- SEA – Jimmy Graham 7-yard pass from Russell Wilson (Steven Hauschka kick), 6:26. Seahawks 7–0. Drive: 14 plays, 89 yards, 8:34.

Second quarter

- ATL – Julio Jones 7-yard pass from Matt Ryan (Matt Bryant kick), 14:14. Tied 7–7. Drive: 13 plays, 75 yards, 7:12.
- SEA – Steven Hauschka 33-yard field goal, 11:20. Seahawks 10–7. Drive: 6 plays, 40 yards, 2:54.
- ATL – Russell Wilson sacked in endzone by Ben Garland for a safety, 9:22. Seahawks 10–9.
- ATL – Matt Bryant 35-yard field goal, 6:06. Falcons 12–10. Drive: 5 plays, 40 yards, 3:16.
- ATL – Tevin Coleman 14-yard pass from Matt Ryan (Matt Bryant kick), 0:53. Falcons 19–10. Drive: 9 plays, 99 yards, 2:55.

Third quarter

- ATL – Devonta Freeman 1-yard run (Matt Bryant kick), 9:12. Falcons 26–10. Drive: 13 plays, 75 yards, 5:48.
- SEA – Steven Hauschka 26-yard field goal, 3:03. Falcons 26–13. Drive: 14 plays, 80 yards, 6:09.

Fourth quarter

- ATL – Matt Bryant 31-yard field goal, 14:57. Falcons 29–13. Drive: 7 plays, 62 yards, 3:06.
- ATL – Mohamed Sanu 3-yard pass from Matt Ryan (Matt Bryant kick), 3:40. Falcons 36–13. Drive: 8 plays, 46 yards, 4:36.
- SEA – Doug Baldwin 31-yard pass from Russell Wilson (Steven Hauschka kick), 3:21. Falcons 36–20. Drive: 1 plays, 31 yards, 0:19.

Top passers

- SEA – Russell Wilson – 17/30, 225 yards, 2 TD, 2 INT
- ATL – Matt Ryan – 26/37, 338 yards, 3 TD

Top rushers

- SEA – Russell Wilson – 6 rushes, 49 yards
- ATL – Tevin Coleman – 11 rushes, 57 yards

Top receivers

- SEA – Doug Baldwin – 5 receptions, 80 yards, TD
- ATL – Julio Jones – 6 receptions, 67 yards, TD

The Falcons' league-leading offense put up 422 total yards on their way to a 36–20 win over the Seahawks and their first trip to the NFC Championship since 2012.

On the game's opening possession, Seattle mounted a 14-play, 81-yard drive that lasted 8:36; Russell Wilson completed all four of his passes for 40 yards and rushed for 16 yards on the drive, eventually finding tight end Jimmy Graham for a seven-yard touchdown. Atlanta responded with their own 13-play, 75-yard drive on their first possession and tied the game with Matt Ryan's 7-yard touchdown pass to Julio Jones on the second play of the second quarter. Devin Hester returned the ensuing kickoff 50 yards to the Seattle 45-yard line and the Seahawks advanced into Falcons territory with Wilson's 33-yard pass to Paul Richardson, who made a diving catch and then ran to the end zone. His catch was initially ruled a touchdown, but replays showed he was touched by Jalen Collins as he was falling to the ground, thus nullifying the scoring play. The drive ended up stalling and Seattle settled for a 33-yard field goal by Steven Hauschka. After Atlanta went three-and-out on their next drive, Hester returned the punt 80 yards to the Falcons' 7-yard line, but Seattle's Kevin Pierre-Louis was called for holding and the Seahawks were pushed back to their own 7-yard line. On the second play of the next drive, center Justin Britt accidentally stepped on Wilson's leg after the snap, causing Wilson to fall backwards into the end zone where he was downed by Ben Garland for a safety. Atlanta added two scores before the end of the half; first, Eric Weems returned the free kick 18 yards to the Falcons' 41-yard line. Ryan then completed a 37-yard pass to Taylor Gabriel that set up Matt Bryant's 35-yard field goal to give the Falcons a 12–10 lead. Seattle had to punt on their next drive and Jon Ryan's 60-yard kick pinned them back at their own 1-yard line. However, Atlanta advanced the ball all the way to the end zone, in nine plays. Ryan hit Mohamed Sanu for 22 yards, Gabriel for 18 yards and Jones for 20 yards before finishing the drive with a 14-yard touchdown pass to running back Tevin Coleman, increasing Atlanta's lead to 19–10 with 53 seconds left in the half.

The Falcons increased their lead on the opening drive of the second half, moving the ball 75 yards—29 yards of which from three carries by Coleman—in 13 plays on the way to Devonta Freeman's one-yard touchdown run that put them up by 16 points. This time, Seattle were able to respond, driving 80 yards in 14 plays, including a 40-yard completion from Wilson to Richardson. Hauschka finished the possession with a 31-yard field goal, cutting the score to 26–13. Atlanta took the kickoff; on 3rd-and-4, Ryan dumped off a short pass to Freeman, who then took off for a 53-yard gain to the Seahawks' 16-yard line, setting up Bryant's 31-yard field goal on the opening play of the fourth quarter. Seattle were able to get into Falcons territory later in the quarter, but Wilson threw an interception to Ricardo Allen who returned it 45 yards to the Seahawks' 46-yard line. Atlanta then drove 46 yards in 8 plays, the last one Ryan's three-yard touchdown pass to Sanu with 3:40 remaining to put the Falcons up by 23 points. Seattle were able to get back within 16 points after Hester returned the kickoff 78 yards and Wilson threw a 31-yard touchdown to Doug Baldwin, but Atlanta effectively sealed the game when Sanu recovered the resulting onside kick. On Seattle's final drive, Wilson was intercepted by Deion Jones.

Ryan finished as the game's leading passer with 26 completions on 37 attempts for 338 yards and three touchdowns. Freeman rushed for 40 yards and a touchdown, while also catching four passes for 80 yards and a touchdown. Wilson threw for 225 yards, two touchdowns and two interceptions, and also finished as the Seahawks' leading rusher with 49 yards. Hester returned five kickoffs for 198 yards.

==== AFC: New England Patriots 34, Houston Texans 16 ====
Houston Texans vs. New England Patriots – Game summary

Quarter	1	2	3	4	Total
Texans	3	10	0	3	16
Patriots	14	3	7	10	34

at Gillette Stadium, Foxborough, Massachusetts

- Date: January 14
- Game time: 8:15 p.m. EST
- Game weather: 28 °F (−2 °C), cloudy
- Game attendance: 66,829
- Referee: Pete Morelli
- TV announcers (CBS): Jim Nantz, Phil Simms, Tracy Wolfson and Jay Feely
- Recap, Game Book

Game information

First quarter

- NE – Dion Lewis 13-yard pass from Tom Brady (Stephen Gostkowski kick), 9:27. Patriots 7–0. Drive: 2 plays, 65 yards, 0:43.
- HOU – Nick Novak 33-yard field goal, 1:15. Patriots 7–3. Drive: 14 plays, 62 yards, 8:12.
- NE – Dion Lewis 98-yard kickoff return (Stephen Gostkowski kick), 1:00. Patriots 14–3. Drive: 0 plays, 0 yards, 0:15.

Second quarter

- HOU – Nick Novak 27-yard field goal, 11:36. Patriots 14–6. Drive: 6 plays, 18 yards, 2:48.
- HOU – C. J. Fiedorowicz 10-yard pass from Brock Osweiler (Nick Novak kick), 10:49. Patriots 14–13. Drive: 2 plays, 12 yards, 0:40.
- NE – Stephen Gostkowski 19-yard field goal, 0:07. Patriots 17–13. Drive: 10 plays, 66 yards, 3:47.

Third quarter

- NE – James White 19-yard pass from Tom Brady (Stephen Gostkowski kick), 9:09. Patriots 24–13. Drive: 9 plays, 90 yards, 3:21.

Fourth quarter

- HOU – Nick Novak 46-yard field goal, 14:51. Patriots 24–16. Drive: 4 plays, 6 yards, 0:50.
- NE – Dion Lewis 1-yard run (Stephen Gostkowski kick), 12:16. Patriots 31–16. Drive: 2 plays, 6 yards, 0:28.
- NE – Stephen Gostkowski 43-yard field goal, 6:37. Patriots 34–16. Drive: 10 plays, 43 yards, 3:45.

Top passers

- HOU – Brock Osweiler – 23/40, 198 yards, TD, 3 INT
- NE – Tom Brady – 18/38, 287 yards, 2 TD, 2 INT

Top rushers

- HOU – Lamar Miller – 19 rushes, 73 yards
- NE – Dion Lewis – 13 rushes, 41 yards, TD

Top receivers

- HOU – DeAndre Hopkins – 6 receptions, 65 yards
- NE – Julian Edelman – 8 receptions, 137 yards

New England's defense intercepted Houston three times, while running back Dion Lewis scored three touchdowns—one rushing, one receiving and one kickoff return—as the Patriots advanced to the AFC Championship Game for the sixth year in a row.

Big plays enabled New England to take a 14–3 lead after just 6 offensive plays. Following a three-and-out from both teams, Texans cornerback A. J. Bouye committed a 30-yard pass interference penalty while trying to cover Chris Hogan, giving New England a first down on Houston's 35-yard line. Quarterback Tom Brady completed two consecutive passes—the first to Hogan for 22 yards and the second to Lewis for a 13-yard touchdown completion. Houston responded by moving the ball 62 yards in 14 plays to score on Nick Novak's 33-yard field goal. On the ensuing kickoff, Lewis returned the ball 98 yards for a touchdown, the first kickoff return touchdown for the Patriots in postseason history.

Houston had to punt after three plays, but on the first play of the second quarter, Brady threw a pass that went off the hands of Michael Floyd and was intercepted by Bouye, who returned it 7 yards to the Patriots' 27-yard line. Houston failed to get the ball into the end zone, but Novak kicked another field goal to make the score 14–6. Texans linebacker Akeem Dent forced and recovered a fumble from Lewis on the kickoff, getting the ball back for his team on the New England 12-yard line. This time, Houston was able to take it all the way, scoring on Brock Osweiler's 10-yard touchdown pass to tight end C. J. Fiedorowicz that made the score 14–13. After three consecutive punts, Brady's 48-yard completion to Julian Edelman gave New England a first down on the Houston 16-yard line. Eventually they got a first and goal from the 3-yard line, but could not score a touchdown, with a Stephen Gostkowski field goal giving the Patriots a 17–13 lead at halftime.

After punts from each team at the start of the second half, Brady completed two passes to Edelman for 40 yards and one to Hogan for 22 yards before finding running back James White in the end zone for a 19-yard touchdown, putting the Patriots up 24–13. Later in the quarter, Devin McCourty's interception of an Osweiler pass gave New England the ball on their 44-yard line, but could not convert this into points. After a few punts, Brady threw a pass that was intercepted by Andre Hal, who returned it 6 yards to the Patriots' 34-yard line. Houston capitalized with Novak's third field goal on the second play of the fourth quarter, making it 24–16. New England had to punt on their next drive, but in what turned out to be a crucial play, Osweiler's first pass after the punt was intercepted and returned 23 yards by Logan Ryan, giving New England the ball on the Texans' 6-yard line. After a 5-yard carry, Lewis added a 1-yard touchdown run that gave the Patriots a 31–16 lead. The Texans were unable to achieve a first down on their next drive and New England drove 43 yards in 10 plays for Gostkowski's 43-yard field goal that gave them a 34–16 lead with under 7 minutes left. Houston's final drive resulted in Osweiler's third interception, this one to Duron Harmon.

Brady completed 18 of 38 passes for 287 yards, two touchdowns and two interceptions, equaling his regular season total. Lewis rushed for 41 yards, caught two passes for 23 yards and returned three kickoffs for 124 yards, and became the first player in NFL postseason history to score touchdowns by rushing, receiving and kick return. Edelman caught eight passes for 137 yards and returned four punts for 24 yards, while Hogan had four receptions for 95 yards. Osweiler completed 23 of 40 passes for 198 yards and a touchdown, with three interceptions. The Patriots advanced to the AFC Championship Game for the sixth consecutive year, surpassing the Oakland Raiders of 1973 to 1977 for most consecutive appearances in conference championship games.

=== Sunday, January 15, 2017 ===
==== NFC: Green Bay Packers 34, Dallas Cowboys 31 ====
Green Bay Packers vs. Dallas Cowboys – Game summary

Quarter	1	2	3	4	Total
Packers	7	14	7	6	34
Cowboys	3	10	0	18	31

at AT&T Stadium, Arlington, Texas

- Date: January 15
- Game time: 4:40 p.m. EST/3:40 p.m. CST
- Game weather: None (retractable roof closed)
- Game attendance: 93,396
- Referee: Tony Corrente
- TV announcers (Fox): Joe Buck, Troy Aikman, Erin Andrews and Chris Myers
- Recap, Game Book

Game information

First quarter

- DAL – Dan Bailey 50-yard field goal, 11:23. Cowboys 3–0. Drive: 8 plays, 43 yards, 3:37.
- GB – Richard Rodgers 34-yard pass from Aaron Rodgers (Mason Crosby kick), 8:58. Packers 7–3. Drive: 5 plays, 75 yards, 2:25.

Second quarter

- GB – Ty Montgomery 3-yard run (Mason Crosby kick), 14:05. Packers 14–3. Drive: 13 plays, 90 yards, 5:47.
- GB – Ty Montgomery 1-yard run (Mason Crosby kick), 7:37. Packers 21–3. Drive: 9 plays, 80 yards, 5:24.
- DAL – Dez Bryant 34-yard pass from Dak Prescott (Dan Bailey kick), 6:03. Packers 21–10. Drive: 4 plays, 75 yards, 1:34.
- DAL – Dan Bailey 33-yard field goal, 1:00. Packers 21–13. Drive: 10 plays, 36 yards, 3:55.

Third quarter

- GB – Jared Cook 3-yard pass from Aaron Rodgers (Mason Crosby kick), 11:25. Packers 28–13. Drive: 6 plays, 75 yards, 3:35.

Fourth quarter

- DAL – Jason Witten 6-yard pass from Dak Prescott (Dan Bailey kick), 11:39. Packers 28–20. Drive: 10 plays, 59 yards, 5:40.
- DAL – Dez Bryant 7-yard pass from Dak Prescott (Dak Prescott run), 4:08. Tied 28–28. Drive: 11 plays, 80 yards, 5:06.
- GB – Mason Crosby 56-yard field goal, 1:33. Packers 31–28. Drive: 8 plays, 37 yards, 2:35.
- DAL – Dan Bailey 52-yard field goal, 0:35. Tied 31–31. Drive: 6 plays, 42 yards, 0:58.
- GB – Mason Crosby 51-yard field goal, 0:00. Packers 34–31. Drive: 6 plays, 43 yards, 0:35.

Top passers

- GB – Aaron Rodgers – 28/43, 356 yards, 2 TD, INT
- DAL – Dak Prescott – 24/38, 302 yards, 3 TD, INT

Top rushers

- GB – Ty Montgomery – 11 rushes, 47 yards, 2 TD
- DAL – Ezekiel Elliott – 22 rushes, 125 yards

Top receivers

- GB – Randall Cobb – 7 receptions, 62 yards
- DAL – Dez Bryant – 9 receptions, 132 yards, 2 TD

In a hard-fought back-and-forth game in which both teams gained over 400 yards of offense, Packers kicker Mason Crosby propelled the team to victory with two 50+ yard field goals in the final two minutes of the game, the second one set up by Aaron Rodgers's 36-yard completion to Jared Cook on 3rd-and-20 with three seconds left.

Dallas took the opening kickoff and drove 43 yards in 8 plays, scoring on Dan Bailey's 50-yard field goal to take a 3–0 lead. Green Bay appeared to go three-and-out when Aaron Rodgers threw an incompletion on 3rd down, but a defensive holding penalty on Benson Mayowa gave them a first down. Taking advantage of their second chance, Ty Montgomery rushed for 15 yards and Randall Cobb caught a pass for 16 yards before Aaron Rodgers finished the drive with a 34-yard touchdown pass to tight end Richard Rodgers. The next time Green Bay got the ball, they scored again, driving 90 yards in 13 plays, including a 32-yard completion from Aaron Rodgers to Davante Adams. On the third play of the second quarter, Montgomery finished the drive with a 3-yard touchdown run, making the score 14–3.

Following a punt, Aaron Rodgers led the Packers back for more points, completing 6 of 7 passes for 59 yards, the longest a 26-yard completion to Geronimo Allison. Fullback Aaron Ripkowski also made a big impact with a 20-yard run, while Montgomery finished the drive with a 1-yard touchdown run to give the team a 21–3 lead. After being dominated until now, Dallas scored 10 points before halftime. On their ensuing drive, Dak Prescott made two key completions to receiver Dez Bryant, the first for 21 yards and the second a 40-yard touchdown pass that cut their deficit to 21–10. On the kickoff, Packers returner Christine Michael muffed the kick and was downed on the 6-yard line, leading to a three-and-out that gave Dallas good field position when Cole Beasley returned the punt 8 yards to his own 49-yard line. Dallas then drove 36 yards in 10 plays, including an 18-yard catch by Beasley on 3rd-and-4, to score on Bailey's 33-yard field goal, cutting the score to 21–13 going into halftime.

Green Bay took the second-half kickoff and scored quickly, with Aaron Rodgers hitting Cobb for 25 yards, Adams for 14 yards and Cook for 26 yards, before finishing the drive with a 3-yard touchdown pass to Cook. Dallas responded with a drive to the Packers' 19-yard line, only to lose the ball when safety Micah Hyde intercepted Prescott's screen pass and returned it 18 yards to the Green Bay 39-yard line. Dallas' defense took the ball back with an interception by safety Jeff Heath, who returned the ball 27 yards to the Cowboys' 41-yard line. From there, Prescott completed 5 passes for 69 yards, the last a six-yard touchdown pass to tight end Jason Witten, making the score 28–20 with 11:39 remaining. After a Green Bay punt, Dallas drove 80 yards in 11 plays; the key player of the drive was rookie running back Ezekiel Elliott, who rushed five times for 34 yards. Bryant also played a major role, catching three passes for 24 yards, the last a 7-yard touchdown catch. Prescott scored the subsequent two-point conversion with a quarterback draw and the game was tied at 28–28. Green Bay got the ball back with 4:08 left and drove to a first down on the Cowboys' 35-yard line. A big play on the drive was a pass interference penalty against Anthony Brown that eliminated an interception. Two runs by Montgomery resulted in a net loss of 3 yards and an incompletion subsequently forced Crosby to try a franchise record 56-yard field goal with 1:38 left. Crosby's kick was good, the third longest in NFL postseason history, and the Packers took a 31–28 lead. Following a touchback on the kickoff, Prescott's completions to Terrance Williams, Witten and Beasley for gains of 24, 11 and 7 yards, respectively, got the team close enough for Bailey to make a 52-yard field goal, tying the game back up at 31–31 with 40 seconds remaining. Following a touchback, Aaron Rodgers completed a 17-yard pass to Montgomery, but was then sacked for a 10-yard loss by Heath. On 2nd-and-20, Rodgers threw an incomplete pass toward Cook on the right side. On 3rd-and-20, with 12 seconds left on the clock and one timeout remaining, Aaron Rodgers took the snap, rolled left and launched a 35-yard pass to Cook, who caught the ball while just barely keeping his feet in bounds along the left sideline. One referee initially ruled him out before another overturned him and called it a catch. After a booth review, the catch was upheld, giving Green Bay the ball at the Dallas 33-yard line with 3 seconds left. After being "iced" by the Cowboys on his initial kick, Crosby successfully kicked again from 51 yards, giving Green Bay a 34–31 win.

Aaron Rodgers completed 28 of 43 passes for 355 yards, two touchdowns and an interception, his first in 9 games. Cook caught six passes for 104 yards and a touchdown, while Montgomery rushed for 41 yards, caught four passes for 34 yards and scored two touchdowns. Hyde had four tackles, a sack and an interception. Crosby's two field goals extended his postseason record streak of consecutive field goals made to 23. Prescott finished the game 24-for-38 for 302 yards, three touchdowns—the first rookie to do so in the postseason in the Super Bowl era—and an interception. Bryant caught 9 passes for 132 yards and two touchdowns, while Elliott had 22 carries for 125 yards. The game was identified as one of the greatest sports moments in Wisconsin history.

==== AFC: Pittsburgh Steelers 18, Kansas City Chiefs 16 ====
Pittsburgh Steelers vs. Kansas City Chiefs – Game summary

Quarter	1	2	3	4	Total
Steelers	6	6	3	3	18
Chiefs	7	0	3	6	16

at Arrowhead Stadium, Kansas City, Missouri

- Date: January 15
- Game time: 8:20 p.m. EST/7:20 p.m. CST (rescheduled from 1:05 p.m. EST/12:05 p.m. CST)
- Game weather: 33 °F (1 °C), cloudy with patches of fog
- Game attendance: 75,678
- Referee: Carl Cheffers
- TV announcers (NBC): Al Michaels, Cris Collinsworth, Michele Tafoya and Heather Cox
- Recap, Game Book

Game information

First quarter

- PIT – Chris Boswell 22-yard field goal, 9:38. Steelers 3–0. Drive: 11 plays, 66 yards, 5:22.
- KC – Albert Wilson 5-yard pass from Alex Smith (Cairo Santos kick), 6:09. Chiefs 7–3. Drive: 6 plays, 55 yards, 3:29.
- PIT – Chris Boswell 38-yard field goal, 3:51. Chiefs 7–6. Drive: 7 plays, 55 yards, 2:18.

Second quarter

- PIT – Chris Boswell 36-yard field goal, 9:18. Steelers 9–7. Drive: 14 plays, 53 yards, 6:30.
- PIT – Chris Boswell 45-yard field goal, 0:55. Steelers 12–7. Drive: 9 plays, 28 yards, 4:08.

Third quarter

- PIT – Chris Boswell 43-yard field goal, 10:06. Steelers 15–7. Drive: 7 plays, 49 yards, 3:42.
- KC – Cairo Santos 48-yard field goal, 0:10. Steelers 15–10. Drive: 7 plays, 16 yards, 2:50.

Fourth quarter

- PIT – Chris Boswell 43-yard field goal, 9:49. Steelers 18–10. Drive: 10 plays, 45 yards, 5:21.
- KC – Spencer Ware 1-yard run (pass failed), 2:43. Steelers 18–16. Drive: 13 plays, 75 yards, 7:06.

Top passers

- PIT – Ben Roethlisberger – 20/31, 224 yards, INT
- KC – Alex Smith – 20/34, 172 yards, TD, INT

Top rushers

- PIT – Le'Veon Bell – 30 rushes, 170 yards
- KC – Spencer Ware – 8 rushes, 35 yards, TD

Top receivers

- PIT – Antonio Brown – 6 receptions, 108 yards
- KC – Travis Kelce – 5 receptions, 77 yards

This game was supposed to have started at 1:05 p.m., EST, but was pushed back to 8:00 due to inclement weather, making this game the first ever divisional round playoff game in NFL history to premiere on Sunday Night Football. Although Pittsburgh was unable to get into the end zone, Chris Boswell's postseason record six field goals were enough for them to become the first team to win a playoff game without scoring a touchdown since the 2006 Indianapolis Colts on their run to a victory in Super Bowl XLI.

The Steelers scored on the game's opening drive, moving the ball 65 yards in 11 plays on the way to Boswell's 22-yard field goal. Kansas City quickly struck back after Demetrius Harris returned Boswell's short kickoff 25 yards to their 45-yard line. The Chiefs then drove 55 yards in six plays, including a 21-yard catch by Travis Kelce, to score on Alex Smith's 5-yard touchdown pass to Albert Wilson, giving them a 7–3 lead. Pittsburgh stormed right back, as Ben Roethlisberger's 52-yard completion to Antonio Brown led to another Boswell field goal that made the score 7–6. On their next drive, they went 53 yards in 14 plays, scoring on Boswell's third field goal, to give them a 9–7 lead with just over 9 minutes left in the half. The Steelers soon got another chance to score when linebacker Ryan Shazier intercepted a pass from Smith on the Chiefs' 44-yard line. Three plays later, Roethlisberger returned the favor with an interception to Eric Berry in the end zone. Kansas City ended up punting after three plays and Brown returned it 6 yards to the Chiefs' 45-yard line. Le'Veon Bell then carried the ball 5 times for 32 yards on a drive that ended with Boswell's 4th field goal, this one from 45 yards, that increased their lead to 12–7. Shortly before halftime, the Steelers had one last scoring chance when cornerback Artie Burns recovered a fumble from Charcandrick West on the Chiefs' 40-yard line. Roethlisberger then completed a 29-yard pass to Brown, but he was tackled on the 11-yard line as time expired.

On Pittsburgh's first possession of the second half, Bell carried the ball five times for 49 yards, including a 38-yard rush on the first play, as the team drove to a 43-yard Boswell field goal that put them up 15–7. Both teams had to punt on their next possessions and Jordan Berry's 35-yard kick gave Kansas City the ball with good field position on the Steelers' 46-yard line. Smith then completed a 20-yard pass to Jeremy Maclin that set up Cairo Santos' 48-yard field goal, cutting their deficit to 15–10 with 10 seconds left in the third quarter. Roethlisberger's completions to Eli Rogers and Jesse James for gains for 14 and 23 yards, respectively, on their next drive moved the team into position for Boswell to kick a record-setting sixth field goal of the game, which he made from 43 yards to give the team an 18–10 lead. For the Chiefs, Smith hit Kelce for a 24-yard gain on their first play and then Spencer Ware gained 11 yards on the ground. After a penalty pushed them into a 2nd-and-25, Smith completed a 17-yard pass to Kelce and a 12-yard completion to Chris Conley on 4th-and-8 allowed them to keep the ball. Several plays later, they faced 4th-and-2 on the Steelers' 4-yard line, but converted again with Smith's 3-yard pass to fullback Anthony Sherman. Ware scored on a 1-yard touchdown run on the next play that cut their deficit to 18–16. Smith completed a pass to Harris on the two-point conversion play, but was negated by a holding penalty on Eric Fisher as he tried to block an outside blitz from linebacker James Harrison. The second attempt was incomplete. With 2:43 left and one timeout remaining, Kansas City still had a chance to get the ball back, especially after Justin Gilbert was tackled on the 5-yard line during the kick return. However, Roethlisberger made completions to Rogers and Brown for gains of 5 and 7 yards, respectively, picking up a first down allowing the Steelers to run out the clock.

Roethlisberger completed 20-for-31 passes for 221 yards and an interception; Brown caught six passes for 108 yards and returned two punts for 9 yards, while Bell rushed 30 times for 170 yards, giving him the highest total of combined yards by any running back in history over his first two playoff games. Bell also joined Terrell Davis as the only two players to rush for at least 160 yards in consecutive postseason games. Smith finished the game 20-for-34 for 172 yards, a touchdown, an interception and nine rushing yards. This was the fifth consecutive home playoff loss for Kansas City, setting a new NFL record. Kansas City also became the first team to lose a playoff game despite scoring at least two more touchdowns than the opponent, with teams being 245–0 when doing so prior to this playoff game.

== Conference championships ==
=== Sunday, January 22, 2017 ===
==== NFC: Atlanta Falcons 44, Green Bay Packers 21 ====
Green Bay Packers vs. Atlanta Falcons – Game summary

Quarter	1	2	3	4	Total
Packers	0	0	15	6	21
Falcons	10	14	13	7	44

at Georgia Dome, Atlanta, Georgia

- Date: January 22
- Game time: 3:05 p.m. EST
- Game weather: Played indoors (domed stadium)
- Game attendance: 71,127
- Referee: Bill Vinovich
- TV announcers (Fox): Joe Buck, Troy Aikman, Erin Andrews and Chris Myers

Game information

First quarter

- ATL – Mohamed Sanu 2-yard pass from Matt Ryan (Matt Bryant kick), 8:24. Falcons 7–0. Drive: 13 plays, 80 yards, 6:36.
- ATL – Matt Bryant 28-yard field goal, 0:14. Falcons 10–0. Drive: 12 plays, 59 yards, 5:21.

Second quarter

- ATL – Matt Ryan 14-yard run (Matt Bryant kick), 7:24. Falcons 17–0. Drive: 9 plays, 80 yards, 3:35.
- ATL – Julio Jones 5-yard pass from Matt Ryan (Matt Bryant kick), 0:03. Falcons 24–0. Drive: 9 plays, 68 yards, 1:47.

Third quarter

- ATL – Julio Jones 73-yard pass from Matt Ryan (Matt Bryant kick), 13:51. Falcons 31–0. Drive: 2 plays, 75 yards, 0:51.
- GB – Davante Adams 2-yard pass from Aaron Rodgers (Mason Crosby kick), 9:19. Falcons 31–7. Drive: 12 plays, 75 yards, 4:32.
- ATL – Devonta Freeman 4-yard pass from Matt Ryan (kick failed, wide right), 4:11. Falcons 37–7. Drive: 8 plays, 75 yards, 5:08.
- GB – Jordy Nelson 3-yard pass from Aaron Rodgers (Aaron Ripkowski run), 0:38. Falcons 37–15. Drive: 9 plays, 75 yards, 3:33.

Fourth quarter

- ATL – Tevin Coleman 3-yard run (Matt Bryant kick), 12:07. Falcons 44–15. Drive: 7 plays, 33 yards, 3:31.
- GB – Jared Cook 1-yard pass from Aaron Rodgers (run failed), 6:43. Falcons 44–21. Drive: 14 plays, 75 yards, 5:24.

Top passers

- GB – Aaron Rodgers – 27/45, 287 yards, 3 TD, INT
- ATL – Matt Ryan – 27/38, 392 yards, 4 TD

Top rushers

- GB – Aaron Rodgers – 4 rushes, 46 yards
- ATL – Devonta Freeman – 14 rushes, 42 yards

Top receivers

- GB – Jared Cook – 7 receptions, 78 yards, TD
- ATL – Julio Jones – 9 receptions, 180 yards, 2 TD

In the final football game played at the Georgia Dome, Atlanta racked up 493 yards, scored on eight of their first nine drives, and converted 10 of 13 third downs as they advanced to their first Super Bowl since 1998.

In the first half alone, the Falcons gained 325 yards as they stormed to a 24–0 lead. On the game's opening drive, they moved the ball 80 yards in 13 plays, featuring a 31-yard reception by seldom-used fullback Patrick DiMarco. Matt Ryan finished the drive with a 2-yard touchdown shovel pass to Mohamed Sanu that gave them an early 7–0 lead. Green Bay responded with a drive to the Falcons' 23-yard line, mainly the result of Jordy Nelson's two receptions for 41 yards, but they were unable to score as Mason Crosby, who had made an NFL record 23 consecutive postseason field goals before this game, missed from 41 yards. Ryan then led the Falcons back for more points, completing 4 of 7 passes for 56 yards on a 14-play, 59-yard drive. Matt Bryant kicked a 28-yard field goal that increased the lead to 10–0 with 14 seconds left in the first quarter.

Green Bay's next drive was remarkably similar to their last one: two key receptions from one receiver (Randall Cobb) picked up 39 yards as they drove to the Falcons' 23-yard line, but lost the ball with a fumble from fullback Aaron Ripkowski, forced and recovered by cornerback Jalen Collins. Back on offense, Ryan completed passes to Julio Jones for gains of 17, 20, and 19 yards, respectively, before he scrambled for a 14-yard touchdown. Later in the quarter, Falcons safety Ricardo Allen intercepted a pass from Aaron Rodgers on the Falcons' 32-yard line. This time, Ryan completed 5 of 7 passes for 59 yards and rushed for 9 additional yards on a 68-yard drive. Faced with 3rd-and-1 on the Packers' 5-yard line with 7 seconds left in the half, he finished the possession with a touchdown pass to Jones; the Falcons led 24–0, having scored on 4 of their 5 first-half drives.

Atlanta scored another touchdown in the first minute of the second half after forcing Green Bay to punt. From his own 27-yard line, Ryan threw a 10-yard pass to Jones, who caught the ball and broke two tackles as he raced all the way to the end zone for a 73-yard touchdown completion. This time Green Bay managed to respond, with tight end Jared Cook catching 3 passes for 50 yards on a 75-yard drive that ended with Rodgers' 2-yard touchdown toss to Davante Adams, cutting the deficit to 31–7. Atlanta extended this to 37–7, with Devonta Freeman rushing 5 times for 28 yards on their own 75-yard drive, and finishing it off with a 4-yard touchdown catch. Rodgers rushed for a 28-yard gain on the first play of Green Bay's next possession, and later completed an 18-yard pass to Cook. With 38 seconds left in the third quarter, he finished the drive with a 3-yard touchdown pass to Nelson; Ripkowski scored a 2-point conversion that cut the score to 37–15. Sanu recovered the ensuing onside kick attempt, returning it 9 yards to the Packers' 32-yard line.

Atlanta then drove to their final score of the game, a 3-yard run by Tevin Coleman three minutes into the fourth quarter. Green Bay then drove 75 yards in 14 plays to score on Rodgers' 1-yard touchdown pass to Cook with six minutes left, culminating the scoring at 44–21. Ryan completed 27 of 38 passes for 392 yards and four touchdowns, as well as three carries for 23 yards and a touchdown. Jones caught nine passes for 180 yards and two touchdowns, while Freeman rushed for 42 yards, caught 4 passes for 42 yards, and scored a touchdown. Rodgers completed 27 of his 45 passing attempts for 287 yards with three touchdowns and an interception.

==== AFC: New England Patriots 36, Pittsburgh Steelers 17 ====
Pittsburgh Steelers vs. New England Patriots – Game summary

Quarter	1	2	3	4	Total
Steelers	0	9	0	8	17
Patriots	10	7	16	3	36

at Gillette Stadium, Foxborough, Massachusetts

- Date: January 22
- Game time: 6:40 p.m. EST
- Game weather: 41 °F (5 °C), cloudy
- Game attendance: 66,829
- Referee: Terry McAulay
- TV announcers (CBS): Jim Nantz, Phil Simms, Tracy Wolfson, Evan Washburn and Jay Feely
- Recap, Game Book

Game information

First quarter

- NE – Stephen Gostkowski 31-yard field goal, 13:08. Patriots 3–0. Drive: 6 plays, 62 yards, 1:52.
- NE – Chris Hogan 16-yard pass from Tom Brady (Stephen Gostkowski kick), 2:47. Patriots 10–0. Drive: 11 plays, 80 yards, 4:36.

Second quarter

- PIT – DeAngelo Williams 5-yard run (kick failed, wide left), 11:31. Patriots 10–6. Drive: 13 plays, 84 yards, 6:16.
- NE – Chris Hogan 34-yard pass from Tom Brady (Stephen Gostkowski kick), 7:43. Patriots 17–6. Drive: 9 plays, 82 yards, 3:48.
- PIT – Chris Boswell 23-yard field goal, 1:39. Patriots 17–9. Drive: 15 plays, 70 yards, 6:04.

Third quarter

- NE – Stephen Gostkowski 47-yard field goal, 9:59. Patriots 20–9. Drive: 9 plays, 55 yards, 3:11.
- NE – LeGarrette Blount 1-yard run (Stephen Gostkowski kick), 2:44. Patriots 27–9. Drive: 8 plays, 88 yards, 3:52.
- NE – Julian Edelman 10-yard pass from Tom Brady (kick failed, wide right), 1:35. Patriots 33–9. Drive: 4 plays, 28 yards, 1:01.

Fourth quarter

- NE – Stephen Gostkowski 26-yard field goal, 6:24. Patriots 36–9. Drive: 8 plays, 24 yards, 3:50.
- PIT – Cobi Hamilton 30-yard pass from Ben Roethlisberger (Ben Roethlisberger-DeAngelo Williams pass), 3:36. Patriots 36–17. Drive: 9 plays, 75 yards, 2:48.

Top passers

- PIT – Ben Roethlisberger – 31/47, 314 yards, TD, INT
- NE – Tom Brady – 32/42, 384 yards, 3 TD

Top rushers

- PIT – DeAngelo Williams – 14 rushes, 34 yards, TD
- NE – LeGarrette Blount – 16 rushes, 47 yards, TD

Top receivers

- PIT – Antonio Brown – 7 receptions, 77 yards
- NE – Chris Hogan – 9 receptions, 180 yards, 2 TD

New England advanced to their seventh Super Bowl in the last 16 seasons under quarterback Tom Brady and coach Bill Belichick, racking up 431 yards and 26 first downs. Pittsburgh's offense had 368 yards, but could only score 17 points, eight of them on a touchdown late in the game with the outcome already decided. Meanwhile, the Steelers' rushing attack, that had been so critical to their earlier playoff wins, was crippled by an early injury to running back Le'Veon Bell, finishing the game with just 54 total yards on the ground.

On the game's opening drive, Brady's 41-yard completion to Julian Edelman set up Stephen Gostkowski's 31-yard field goal, giving New England a 3–0 lead less than two minutes into the game. Following several punts, the Patriots went on an 80-yard, 11-play drive, the longest gain being a 26-yard catch by receiver Chris Hogan. Brady finished it off with a 16-yard touchdown pass to Hogan, for a 10–0 lead. On the second play of Pittsburgh's next drive, Bell suffered a game-ending groin injury. However, his replacement DeAngelo Williams caught two passes for nine yards and rushed four times for 25 yards, the last carry a five-yard touchdown run to complete the 13-play, 84-yard drive early in the second quarter. Chris Boswell missed the extra point, with the score remaining 10–6.

New England stormed right back, driving 82 yards in nine plays and scoring on Brady's 34-yard touchdown pass to Hogan on a flea flicker play. Pittsburgh then moved the ball to the Patriots' 19-yard line, where Ben Roethlisberger threw a pass to tight end Jesse James that was initially ruled a touchdown, but a replay review determined James was down on the 1-yard line. On the next play, Williams was dropped for a one-yard loss by Dont'a Hightower and Patrick Chung. On second down, Williams was tackled for a three-yard loss by nose tackle Vincent Valentine. On third down, Roethlisberger's pass was incomplete, so the team settled for Boswell's field goal to make the score 17–9.

New England dominated the second half, burying the Steelers with four unanswered scores. After forcing them to punt, New England drove 55 yards in nine plays, 24 of them coming on a catch by Hogan. Gostkowski finished the drive with a 47-yard field goal that put the team up 20–9. Following another punt, Brady's 39-yard completion to Hogan led to a one-yard touchdown by LeGarrette Blount, giving the team a 27–9 lead with 2:44 left in the third quarter. On the first play after the kickoff, Kyle Van Noy forced a fumble from Eli Rogers that was recovered by linebacker Rob Ninkovich on the Steelers' 28-yard line. Brady completed an 18-yard pass to Edelman on the next play, and eventually found him in the end zone for a 10-yard touchdown pass. Gostkowski missed the extra point, but the Patriots had effectively put the game away with a 33–9 lead going into the fourth quarter.

In the final period, the Steelers drove to New England's 2-yard line, but turned the ball over on downs. Then after a punt, Eric Rowe intercepted a pass from Roethlisberger and returned it 37 yards to the Steelers' 32-yard line, leading to a Gostkowski field goal that increased New England's lead to 36–9. All that remained from this point on was Roethlisberger's garbage-time 30-yard touchdown pass to Cobi Hamilton and subsequent 2-point conversion pass to Williams that made the final score 36–17. Brady completed 32 of his 42 passing attempts for 384 yards and three touchdowns. Hogan caught nine passes for 180 yards and two touchdowns, while Edelman had eight receptions for 118 yards and a touchdown. Roethlisberger threw for 314 yards, with a touchdown and an interception.

== Super Bowl LI: New England Patriots 34, Atlanta Falcons 28 (OT) ==
New England Patriots vs. Atlanta Falcons – Game summary

Quarter	1	2	3	4	OT	Total
Patriots	0	3	6	19	6	34
Falcons	0	21	7	0	0	28

at NRG Stadium, Houston, Texas

- Date: February 5
- Game time: 6:30 p.m. EST/5:30 p.m. CST
- Game weather: None (retractable roof closed)
- Game attendance: 70,807
- Referee: Carl Cheffers
- TV announcers (Fox): Joe Buck, Troy Aikman, Erin Andrews and Chris Myers
- Recap, Game Book

Game information

First quarter

- No scoring plays.

Second quarter

- ATL – Devonta Freeman 5-yard run (Matt Bryant kick), 12:15. Falcons 7–0. Drive: 5 plays, 71 yards, 1:53.
- ATL – Austin Hooper 19-yard pass from Matt Ryan (Matt Bryant kick), 8:48. Falcons 14–0. Drive: 5 plays, 62 yards, 1:49.
- ATL – Robert Alford 82-yard interception return (Matt Bryant kick), 2:21. Falcons 21–0.
- NE – Stephen Gostkowski 41-yard field goal, 0:02. Falcons 21–3. Drive: 11 plays, 52 yards, 2:19.

Third quarter

- ATL – Tevin Coleman 6-yard pass from Matt Ryan (Matt Bryant kick), 8:31. Falcons 28–3. Drive: 8 plays, 85 yards, 4:14.
- NE – James White 5-yard pass from Tom Brady (kick failed, wide right), 2:06. Falcons 28–9. Drive: 13 plays, 75 yards, 6:25.

Fourth quarter

- NE – Stephen Gostkowski 33-yard field goal, 9:44. Falcons 28–12. Drive: 12 plays, 72 yards, 5:07.
- NE – Danny Amendola 6-yard pass from Tom Brady (James White run), 5:56. Falcons 28–20. Drive: 5 plays, 25 yards, 2:28.
- NE – James White 1-yard run (Tom Brady-Danny Amendola pass), 0:57. Tied 28–28. Drive: 10 plays, 91 yards, 2:33.

Overtime

- NE – James White 2-yard run, 11:02. Patriots 34–28. Drive: 8 plays, 75 yards, 3:58.

Top passers

- NE – Tom Brady – 43/62, 466 yards, 2 TD, INT
- ATL – Matt Ryan – 17/23, 284 yards, 2 TD

Top rushers

- NE – LeGarrette Blount – 11 rushes, 31 yards
- ATL – Devonta Freeman – 11 rushes, 75 yards, TD

Top receivers

- NE – James White – 14 receptions, 110 yards, TD
- ATL – Julio Jones – 4 receptions, 87 yards

Despite the Falcons taking a 28–3 lead midway through the third quarter, the Patriots scored 25 unanswered points to tie the game at 28 with less than a minute left in regulation and take the game to the first overtime period in Super Bowl history. On the first possession of overtime, Patriots running back James White punched in the game-winning score to give his team a 34–28 comeback victory. Additionally, this was the first Super Bowl since XLVII four years earlier to not have both #1 seeds from their respective conferences against each other, as Atlanta was the #2 seed in the NFC.

== Television coverage ==
All playoffs games were televised nationally on network television.

ABC simulcasted one AFC Wild Card game with ESPN, and one NFC Wild Card game was broadcast on NBC. Coverage of the remainder of the AFC playoff games was split between CBS and NBC, while the remainder of the NFC playoff games was broadcast by Fox. CBS had exclusive coverage of the AFC Championship Game while Fox had exclusive coverage of the NFC Championship Game and Super Bowl LI.
