= Xavier Hill =

American football player (born 2001)

Profile
- Position: Offensive lineman

Personal information
- Born: March 26, 2001 (age 25)
- Listed height: 6 ft 4 in (1.93 m)
- Listed weight: 320 lb (145 kg)

Career information
- High school: Olive Branch (Olive Branch, Mississippi)
- College: LSU (2020–2022); Memphis (2023–2024); Colorado (2025)
- NFL draft: 2026: undrafted

Career history
- New York Jets (2026)*
- * Offseason or practice squad member only

Awards and highlights
- First-team All-AAC (2024); Second-team All-AAC (2023)

Xavier Hill (born March 26, 2001) is an American football offensive lineman. He played college football for the Colorado Buffaloes, Memphis Tigers, and for the LSU Tigers.

== Early life ==
Hill attended Olive Branch High School in Olive Branch, Mississippi. He did not play organized football until his junior season. Coming out of high school, Hill committed to play college football for the Alabama Crimson Tide over offers from LSU and Tennessee. However, he later decommitted from the Crimson Tide, reopening his recruitment. Ultimately, Hill signed to play for the LSU Tigers.

== College career ==
In three years at LSU from 2020 to 2022, Hill played in seven games while making two starts. After the 2022 season, he entered the NCAA transfer portal.

Hill transferred to play for the Memphis Tigers. In two years at Memphis from 2023 to 2024, he started all 26 games while earning first-team all-conference honors in 2024. After the 2024 season, Hill once again entered the NCAA transfer portal.

Hill transferred to play for the Colorado Buffaloes. In 2025, he played in 11 games while making 10 starts. After the season, Hill declared for the NFL draft.

== Professional career ==
After going unselected in the 2026 NFL draft, Hill signed with the New York Jets as an undrafted free agent. He was waived by the Jets on August 30, 2026.
