= Aaron Ripkowski =

American football player (born 1992)

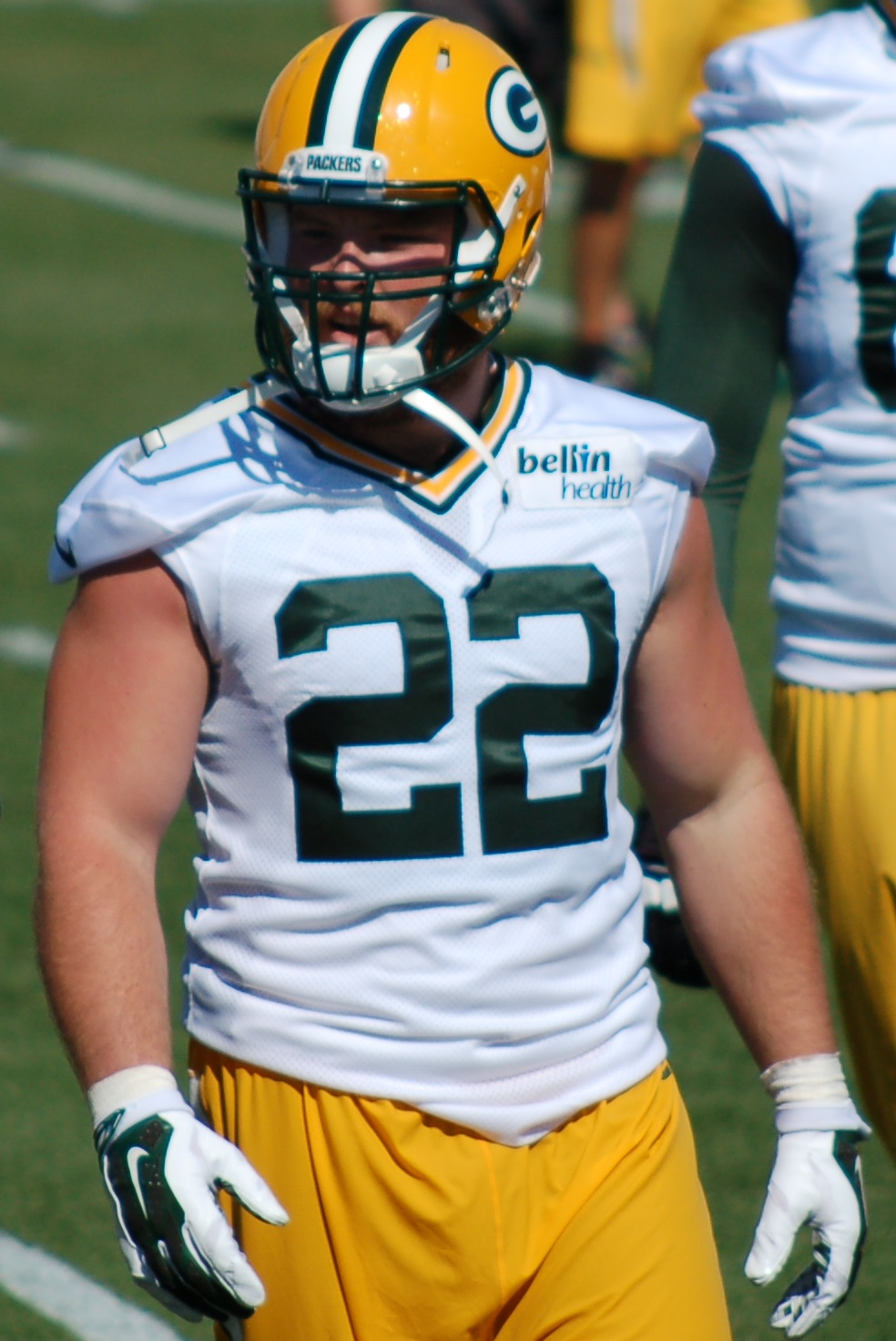
- Ripkowski with the Green Bay Packers in 2015

No. 22
- Position: Fullback

Personal information
- Born: December 20, 1992 (age 33); Houston, Texas, U.S.
- Listed height: 6 ft 1 in (1.85 m)
- Listed weight: 256 lb (116 kg)

Career information
- High school: Dayton (Dayton, Texas)
- College: Oklahoma (2011–2014)
- NFL draft: 2015: 6th round, 206th overall pick

Career history
- Green Bay Packers (2015–2017); Kansas City Chiefs (2019)*
- * Offseason or practice squad member only

Awards and highlights
- Second-team All-Big 12 (2014)

Career NFL statistics
- Rushing attempts: 39
- Rushing yards: 163
- Rushing touchdowns: 2
- Receptions: 17
- Receiving yards: 103
- Receiving touchdowns: 1
- Stats at Pro Football Reference

Aaron Randal Ripkowski (born December 20, 1992) is an American former professional football player who was a fullback in the National Football League (NFL). He played college football for the Oklahoma Sooners, and was selected by the Green Bay Packers in the sixth round of the 2015 NFL draft.

== Early life ==
Ripkowski attended and played high school football at Dayton High School.

== College career ==
Ripkowski attended the University of Oklahoma, where he played on the Sooners from 2011 to 2014 under head coach Bob Stoops. In the 2013 season, he had one reception for a three-yard touchdown on the season. In the 2014 season, he had seven receptions for 38 receiving yards and a receiving touchdown to go along with six carries for 13 rushing yards and three rushing touchdowns. In four years at Oklahoma, he appeared in 47 games and started 17.

== Professional career ==
External videos
- Ripkowski gets drafted by Green Bay

Pre-draft measurables
Height	Weight	40-yard dash	10-yard split	20-yard split	20-yard shuttle	Three-cone drill	Vertical jump	Broad jump	Wonderlic
6 1 3/8	238 lb (108 kg)	4.70 s	1.64 s	2.70 s	4.33 s	7.59 s	33 in (0.84 m)	9 ft 5 in (2.87 m)	31
All values are from Pro Day

=== Green Bay Packers ===
==== 2015 season ====
Ripkowski was selected in the sixth round (206th overall) by the Green Bay Packers in the 2015 NFL draft. On May 8, 2015, he signed a contract with the Packers. In his rookie season, Ripkowski was the Packers' backup fullback behind veteran John Kuhn. He appeared in 15 games, finishing the year with nine tackles on special teams. Ripkowski recorded his first career NFL reception, an 18-yard catch and run from quarterback Aaron Rodgers against the Carolina Panthers in Week 9. Overall, he appeared in fifteen regular season games and two playoff games. He mostly contributed on special teams.

==== 2016 season ====
In 2016, entering his second year, Ripkowski became the starting fullback after the Packers did not re-sign John Kuhn. As the 2016 season progressed, Ripkowski's role expanded due to injuries to running backs Eddie Lacy and James Starks. He finished the 2016 regular season with 34 carries for 150 rushing yards and two rushing touchdowns to go along with nine receptions for 46 receiving yards and one receiving touchdown. He also contributed on special teams. The Packers finished with a 10–6 record and made the playoffs. In the Wild Card Round against the New York Giants, he had two carries for one rushing yard and one rushing touchdown to go along with two receptions for 11 receiving yards in the 38–13 victory. In the Divisional Round against the Dallas Cowboys, he had four carries for 24 rushing yards in the 34–31 victory. In the NFC Championship against the Atlanta Falcons, he had three carries for 11 rushing yards and two receptions for 28 receiving yards but was responsible for a fumble in the 44–21 loss.

==== 2017 season ====
In the 2017 season, Ripkowski appeared in all 16 games and recorded five carries for 13 rushing yards and seven receptions for 39 receiving yards. He contributed on special teams.

On September 1, 2018, Ripkowski was released by the Packers.

=== Kansas City Chiefs ===
On January 31, 2019, Ripkowski signed a reserve/future contract with the Kansas City Chiefs. He was waived by the Chiefs on May 3.

== Career statistics ==
Legend
**Bold**	Career high

=== NFL ===
Regular season statistics
Year	Team	Games		Rushing					Receiving					Fumbles	
Year	Team	GP	GS	Att	Yds	Avg	Lng	TD	Rec	Yds	Avg	Lng	TD	Fum	Lost
2015	GB	15	0	0	0	0.0	0	0	1	18	**18.0**	**18**	0	0	0
2016	GB	16	8	**34**	**150**	**4.4**	**15**	**2**	**9**	**46**	5.1	9	**1**	0	0
2017	GB	16	2	5	13	2.6	4	0	7	39	5.6	12	0	0	0
Total		47	10	39	163	4.2	15	2	17	103	6.1	18	1	0	0

Postseason statistics
Year	Team	Games		Rushing					Receiving					Fumbles	
Year	Team	GP	GS	Att	Yds	Avg	Lng	TD	Rec	Yds	Avg	Lng	TD	Fum	Lost
2015	GB	2	0	0	0	0.0	0	0	0	0	0.0	0	0	0	0
2016	GB	3	0	**9**	**36**	**4.0**	**20**	**1**	**4**	**39**	**9.8**	**20**	0	**1**	**1**
Total		5	0	9	36	4.0	20	1	4	39	9.8	20	0	1	1

=== College ===
Oklahoma Sooners
Season	Games		Rushing					Receiving				
Season	GP	GS	Att	Yds	Avg	Lng	TD	Rec	Yds	Avg	Lng	TD
2011	9	0	0	0	0.0	0	0	0	0	0.0	0	0
2012	12	1	0	0	0.0	0	0	0	0	0.0	0	0
2013	13	7	0	0	0.0	0	0	1	3	3.0	3	**1**
2014	13	9	**6**	**13**	**2.2**	**5**	**3**	**7**	**38**	**5.4**	**9**	**1**
Total	47	17	6	13	2.2	5	3	8	41	5.1	9	2
